= 1960 Big Ten Conference football season =

- Sport: American football
- Teams: 10
- Top draft pick: Joe Rutgens
- Champion: Minnesota
- Runners-up: Iowa
- Season MVP: Tom Brown

Seasons
- 1959 1961

1960 Big Ten Conference football standings
	Conf.					Overall
Team	W		L		T	W		L		T
No. 1 Minnesota +	6	–	1	–	0	8	–	2	–	0
No. 3 Iowa +	5	–	1	–	0	8	–	1	–	0
No. 8 Ohio State	5	–	2	–	0	7	–	2	–	0
No. 15 Michigan State	4	–	2	–	0	6	–	2	–	1
Illinois	3	–	4	–	0	5	–	4	–	0
Michigan	3	–	4	–	0	5	–	4	–	0
Northwestern	3	–	4	–	0	5	–	4	–	0
No. 19 Purdue	3	–	4	–	0	4	–	4	–	1
Wisconsin	2	–	5	–	0	4	–	5	–	0
Indiana	0	–	7	–	0	1	–	8	–	0
+ – Conference co-champions; Rankings from AP Poll

The 1960 Big Ten Conference football season was the 65th season of college football played by the member schools of the Big Ten Conference and was a part of the 1960 college football season.

The 1960 Minnesota Golden Gophers football team, under head coach Murray Warmath, compiled an 8–2 record, won the Big Ten championship, led the conference in scoring defense (8.8 points allowed per game), and lost to Washington in the 1961 Rose Bowl. The Golden Gophers were ranked No. 1 in the AP and Coaches Polls, both of which were released prior to the Rose Bowl. Guard Tom Brown was a consensus first-team All-American, won the Outland Trophy as college football's best interior lineman, finished second in the Heisman Trophy voting, and received the Chicago Tribune Silver Football as the Big Ten's most valuable player.

The 1960 Iowa Hawkeyes football team, in its final season under head coach Forest Evashevski, compiled an 8–1 record, led the Big Ten in scoring offense (26.0 points per game), and was ranked No. 3 in the final AP Poll and No. 2 in the final Coaches' Poll. Iowa's only loss was against Minnesota. Halfback Larry Ferguson, quarterback Wilburn Hollis, and guard Mark Manders were first-team All-Big Ten players.

The conference's statistical leaders included Ron Miller of Wisconsin with 1,351 passing yards, Bob Ferguson of Ohio State with 853 rushing yards and 78 points scored, Elbert Kimbrough of Northwestern with 378 receiving yards, and Tom Matte of Ohio State with 1,419 yards of total offense.

== Season overview ==
=== Results and team statistics ===
Conf. Rank	Team	Head coach	AP final	AP high	Overall record	Conf. record	PPG	PAG	MVP
1	Minnesota	Murray Warmath	#1	#1	8–2	6–1	22.8	**8.8**	**Tom Brown**
2	Iowa	Forest Evashevski	#3	#1	8–1	5–1	**26.0**	12.0	Bernie Wyatt
3	Ohio State	Woody Hayes	#8	#3	7–2	5–2	23.2	10.0	Tom Matte
4	Michigan State	Duffy Daugherty	#15	#6	6–2–1	4–2	21.4	13.1	Tom Wilson
5 (tie)	Illinois	Pete Elliott	NR	#4	5–4	3–4	15.6	13.0	Joe Rutgens
5 (tie)	Michigan	Bump Elliott	NR	NR	5–4	3–4	14.8	9.3	Dennis Fitzgerald
5 (tie)	Northwestern	Ara Parseghian	NR	#6	5–4	3–4	11.9	11.4	Mike Stock
5 (tie)	Purdue	Jack Mollenkopf	#19	#7	4–4–1	3–4	23.6	18.1	Bernie Allen
9	Wisconsin	Milt Bruhn	NR	#11	4–5	2–5	16.4	20.3	Tom Wiesner
10	Indiana	Phil Dickens	NR	NR	1–8	0–7	7.7	27.0	Earl Faison

Key
AP final = Team's rank in the final AP Poll of the 1960 season
AP high = Team's highest rank in the AP Poll throughout the 1960 season
PPG = Average of points scored per game
PAG = Average of points allowed per game
MVP = Most valuable player as voted by players on each team as part of the voting process to determine the winner of the Chicago Tribune Silver Football trophy; trophy winner in bold

== Statistical leaders ==
The Big Ten's individual statistical leaders for the 1960 season include the following:

=== Passing yards ===
Rank	Name	Team	Yards
1	Ron Miller	Wisconsin	1,351
2	Dick Thornton	Northwestern	901
3	Bernie Allen	Purdue	765
4	Tom Wilson	Michigan State	761
5	Dave Glinka	Michigan	755

=== Rushing yards ===
Rank	Name	Team	Yards
1	Bob Ferguson	Ohio State	853
2	Tom Matte	Ohio State	682
3	Larry Ferguson	Iowa	665
4	Willie Jones	Purdue	576
5	Mike Stock	Northwestern	536

=== Receiving yards ===
Rank	Name	Team	Yards
1	Elbert Kimbrough	Northwestern	378
2	Pat Richter	Wisconsin	362
3	Tom Wiesner	Wisconsin	356
4	Chuck Bryant	Ohio State	336
5	Jim Tiller	Purdue	237

=== Total yards ===
Rank	Name	Team	Yards
1	Tom Matte	Ohio State	1,419
2	Ron Miller	Wisconsin	1,395
3	Dick Thornton	Northwestern	1,126
4	Tom Wilson	Michigan State	936
5	Bernie Allen	Purdue	905

=== Scoring ===
Rank	Name	Team	Points
1	Bob Ferguson	Ohio State	78
2	Wilburn Hollis	Iowa	66
3	Sandy Stephens	Minnesota	54
4	Larry Ferguson	Iowa	36
4	Willie Jones	Purdue	36
4	Dave Raimey	Michigan	36

== Awards and honors ==
=== All-Big Ten honors ===
The following players were picked by the Associated Press (AP) and/or the United Press International (UPI) as first-team players on the 1960 All-Big Ten Conference football team.

Position	Name	Team	Selectors
Quarterback	Tom Matte	Ohio State	AP [halfback], UPI [quarterback]
Quarterback	Wilburn Hollis	Iowa	AP
Halfback	Larry Ferguson	Iowa	AP, UPI
Halfback	Herb Adderly	Michigan State	UPI
Fullback	Bob Ferguson	Ohio State	AP, UPI
End	Earl Faison	Indiana	AP, UPI
End	Elbert Kimbrough	Northwestern	AP, UPI
Tackle	Jerry Beabout	Purdue	AP, UPI
Tackle	Joe Rutgens	Illinois	AP
Tackle	Jim Tyrer	Ohio State	UPI
Guard	Tom Brown	Minnesota	AP, UPI
Guard	Mark Manders	Iowa	AP, UPI
Center	Greg Larson	Minnesota	AP, UPI

=== All-American honors ===
At the end of the 1960 season, Big Ten players secured two of the 11 consensus first-team picks for the 1960 College Football All-America Team. The Big Ten's consensus All-Americans were:

Position	Name	Team	Selectors
Guard	Tom Brown	Minnesota	AFCA, AP, FWAA, NEA, TSN, UPI, CP, Time, WCFF
Fullback	Bob Ferguson	Ohio State	AFCA, AP, FWAA, NEA, SN, UPI, CP, Time, WC

Other Big Ten players who were named first-team All-Americans by at least one selector were:

Position	Name	Team	Selectors
Tackle	Jerry Beabout	Purdue	FWAA
Guard	Mark Manders	Iowa	FWAA, TSN
Halfback	Larry Ferguson	Iowa	FWAA

=== Other awards ===
Minnesota's Tom Brown won the Outland Trophy as the best interior lineman in college football. He also finished second in the voting for the Heisman Trophy. Ohio State quarterback Tom Matte of finished seventh in the Heisman voting.

== 1961 NFL draft ==
The following Big Ten players were among the first 100 picks in the 1961 NFL draft:

Name	Position	Team	Round	Overall pick
Joe Rutgens	Tackle	Illinois	1	3
Tom Matte	Halfback	Ohio State	1	7
Herb Adderley	Back	Michigan State	1	12
Elbert Kimbrough	End	Northwestern	2	18
Bill Brown	Back	Illinois	2	20
Fred Arbanas	End	Michigan State	2	22
Ron Miller	Quarterback	Wisconsin	3	41
Earl Faison	End	Indiana	5	66
Joe Krakoski	Back	Illinois	6	72
Larry Wood	Back	Northwestern	6	75
Greg Larson	Center	Minnesota	6	81
Dick Thornton	Quarterback	Northwestern	6	83
Ike Grimsley	Running back	Michigan State	7	91
Ray Purdin	Back	Northwestern	7	93
Irv Cross	Back	Northwestern	7	98
