= 1961 Rose Bowl =

American college football game

- 47th Rose Bowl Game
Minnesota Golden Gophers	Washington Huskies
(8–1)	(9–1)
7	17
Head coach: Murray Warmath	Head coach: Jim Owens
AP / Coaches; 1 / 1	AP / Coaches; 6 / 5
	1	2	3	4	Total
Minnesota	0	0	7	0	7
Washington	3	14	0	0	17
- Date: January 2, 1961
- Season: 1960
- Stadium: Rose Bowl
- Location: Pasadena, California
- Player of the Game: Bob Schloredt (QB Washington)
- Favorite: Minnesota by 7 points
- National anthem: UM Marching Band
- Referee: Lee Eisan (AAWU; split crew: AAWU, Big Ten)
- Halftime show: UM Marching Band, UW Marching Band
- Attendance: 97,314

United States TV coverage
- Network: NBC (B/W)
- Announcers: Mel Allen; Chick Hearn
- Nielsen ratings: 32.5

The 1961 Rose Bowl was the 47th Rose Bowl game, played on January 2, 1961, in Pasadena, California. The #6 Washington Huskies defeated the top-ranked Minnesota Golden Gophers, 17–7. Washington quarterback Bob Schloredt returned from a mid-season injury was named the Player Of The Game for the second straight year. As New Year's Day fell on a Sunday, the major bowl games were played on Monday.

This was the first season of the new agreement with the Athletic Association of Western Universities (AAWU) to send their champion. Its predecessor, the Pacific Coast Conference (PCC), had dissolved after the 1958 season. The Big Ten Conference was no longer in a formal agreement with the Rose Bowl following the demise of the PCC: Big Ten champion Minnesota received and accepted an "at-large" invitation.

The Great Rose Bowl Hoax occurred during halftime. As seen by an estimated 30 million television viewers, students from nearby Caltech altered the plans for the Washington card stunts, which spelled "CALTECH" instead of "HUSKIES" and showed the Caltech Beaver mascot instead of the Washington Husky.

== Teams ==
The Pacific Coast Conference (PCC), from which the "West" representative was historically selected, dissolved in early 1959 following a pay-for-play scandal. A new conference, the AAWU, commonly referred to as the "Big Five", formed in 1959 with the four California schools (Cal, Stanford, USC, and UCLA) and Washington. For scheduling, former PCC members Oregon, Oregon State, and Washington State dropped UCLA and USC, with the exception of Oregon State at USC. Idaho, who was not part of the scandal but had become uncompetitive, was dropped from the schedules of all the AAWU members. The PCC agreement with the Rose bowl was dissolved for the 1959 season, but former member Washington was invited to the game and demolished Wisconsin.

For the 1960 season, the AAWU contracted a new agreement which went into effect with this game. The Big Ten agreement also was dissolved, but the Big Ten had authorized its members to accept Rose Bowl invitations at their discretion. A new agreement with the Big Ten was reached until 1962, which became effective with the 1963 Rose Bowl.

=== 1960 Washington Huskies ===
The 1960 Huskies defeated the College of the Pacific 55–6 and former PCC member Idaho 23–0 to open the season. Washington lost 15–14 to Navy at Husky Stadium, ending a seven-game winning streak. The Midshipmen finished the regular season at 8–1, but lost to Missouri in the Orange Bowl. The Huskies won at Stanford and beat UCLA 10–8. The Huskies continued on with a full PCC schedule, playing Oregon State in Portland and hosting Oregon in Seattle, winning both non-league games by a single point.

The November 5 game against USC at the L.A. Coliseum was the deciding factor in the Rose Bowl race, with the Huskies blanking the Trojans 34–0. The Huskies beat the Cal Bears 27–7 at home to win the AAWU (or "Big Five") championship outright, undefeated in conference play. The final game of the regular season was the Apple Cup (not yet named), where the Huskies narrowly escaped with an 8–7 win in Spokane over cross-state (and non-conference) rival Washington State to finish the regular season at 9–1. Ranked sixth by the AP writers poll, the defending Rose Bowl champions were fifth in the UPI coaches poll. The final polls were released in late November, at the end of the regular season.

=== 1960 Minnesota Golden Gophers ===
The 1960 Gophers came to the Rose Bowl as the #1 team in the nation, and were favored by a touchdown over Washington. The Gophers were led by Sandy Stephens, the first African-American All-American starting quarterback at the school (but not in the history of the Rose Bowl, which would have been the 1922 Rose Bowl). The Gophers had an early 26–14 non-conference win at #12 Nebraska. They shut out both Indiana and Northwestern, then also blanked Michigan 10–0 at Michigan Stadium to win the Little Brown Jug. A win over non-conference Kansas State put Minnesota at #3. The next game at #1 Iowa was one of the most notable games in the Floyd of Rosedale rivalry. Minnesota won 27–10 (and the pig) and were top-ranked, but then lost to Purdue the next week. A 26–14 win over Wisconsin on NCAA television put them back at #1 to finish the season. The Gophers were tied with Iowa in the Big Ten standings, each with a loss. The final AP poll of November 29 was one of the closest ever: Minnesota with 17½ first-place votes, Mississippi 16, and Iowa 12½.

== Game summary ==
The weather in Pasadena on January 2 was clear and sunny. Washington wore their dark home jerseys (actually deep blue), gold pants, and gold helmets. Minnesota wore white away jerseys with maroon with gold shoulder stripes, gold pants, and white helmets. The ceremonial pregame coin toss to determine first possession employed a souvenir gold dollar minted for Alaska's statehood in 1959.

The Huskies dominated the first half, scoring all 17 points. Minnesota led in all the final statistics, but the most telling one was its passing game: Gopher quarterback Sandy Stephens completed only two of ten passes for 21 yards and was intercepted three times. MVP Bob Schloredt completed only two of four passes for 16 yards (no interceptions), but was the game's leading rusher with 68 yards on five carries. The most enduring story of the game was Minnesota claiming the National Championship despite losing.

=== Halftime ===
The Minnesota marching band performed first, followed by UW band, when the card stunts began. The Washington card section was on the east side of the Rose Bowl stadium, facing the press box and television cameras. The NBC national television broadcast was trained on the band and card stunts. The 14th card stunt design displayed "CALTECH" instead of "HUSKIES" in big block letters on a white background. The announcers and the stadium fell silent for several moments before breaking into laughter.

=== Scoring ===
==== First quarter ====
- Wash. — Fleming, 34-yard field goal, 9:10, Wash. 3–0

==== Second quarter ====
- Wash. — Wooten, 4-yard pass from Schloredt (Fleming kick), 13:35, Wash. 10–0
- Wash. — Schloredt, 1-yard run (Fleming kick), 4:14, Wash. 17–0

==== Third quarter ====
- Minn. — Munsey, 18-yard run (Rogers kick), 9:15, Wash. 17–7

==== Fourth quarter ====
- no scoring

== Aftermath ==
Washington quarterback Bob Schloredt was named Player of the Game for a second consecutive year, the first to repeat; he was named co-Player of the Game with George Fleming the previous year. Three other players have subsequently repeated as Rose Bowl Players of the Game: Charles White (USC), Ron Dayne (Wisconsin), and Vince Young (Texas).

Minnesota was still the AP and UPI national champion, as those final polls were released in late November and did not consider the bowl results. Iowa, Missouri, Ole Miss, and Washington have all been recognized as national champions for the 1960 season by various organizations.

Final polls in January (after the bowls) did not occur until much later. The AP had a January poll after the 1965 season, but not the next two; it went permanently post-bowl for the 1968 season. The final UPI coaches poll did not move until the 1974 season (January 1975), following the bowl defeats of UPI champions Texas (1970) and Alabama (1973). In five of the next six seasons (1974–1979), the top-ranked team in the UPI poll at the end of the regular season lost its bowl game; the exception was Pittsburgh (1976).
