= 1960 Illinois Fighting Illini football team =

American college football season

1960 Illinois Fighting Illini football
- Conference: Big Ten Conference
- Record: 5–4 (3–4 Big Ten)
- Head coach: Pete Elliott (1st season)
- MVP: Joe Rutgens
- Captain: Bill Brown
- Home stadium: Memorial Stadium

1960 Big Ten Conference football standings
	Conf.					Overall
Team	W		L		T	W		L		T
No. 1 Minnesota +	6	–	1	–	0	8	–	2	–	0
No. 3 Iowa +	5	–	1	–	0	8	–	1	–	0
No. 8 Ohio State	5	–	2	–	0	7	–	2	–	0
No. 15 Michigan State	4	–	2	–	0	6	–	2	–	1
Illinois	3	–	4	–	0	5	–	4	–	0
Michigan	3	–	4	–	0	5	–	4	–	0
Northwestern	3	–	4	–	0	5	–	4	–	0
No. 19 Purdue	3	–	4	–	0	4	–	4	–	1
Wisconsin	2	–	5	–	0	4	–	5	–	0
Indiana	0	–	7	–	0	1	–	8	–	0
+ – Conference co-champions; Rankings from AP Poll

The 1960 Illinois Fighting Illini football team was an American football team that represented the University of Illinois as a member of the Big Ten Conference during the 1960 Big Ten season. In their first year under head coach Pete Elliott, the Illini compiled a 5–4 record (3–4 in conference games), finished in a three-way tie for fifth place in the Big Ten, and outscored opponents by a total of 140 to 117.

The team's statistical leaders included quarterback John Easterbrook (538 passing yards, 46.0% completion rate), halfback Bill Brown (531 rushing yards, 4.1 yards per carry), and end Ed O'Bradovich (21 receptions for 233 yards). Tackle Joe Rutgens was selected as the team's most valuable player. Rutgens also received first-team honors on the 1960 All-Big Ten Conference football team.

The team played its home games at Memorial Stadium in Champaign, Illinois.

== Schedule ==
Date	Opponent	Rank	Site	Result	Attendance	Source
September 24	Indiana	No. 4	Memorial Stadium; Champaign, IL (rivalry)	W 17–6	38,444	
October 1	West Virginia*	No. 4	Memorial Stadium; Champaign, IL	W 33–0	43,612	
October 8	No. 5 Ohio State	No. 4	Memorial Stadium; Champaign, IL (Illibuck)	L 7–34	71,119	
October 15	at No. 10 Minnesota		Memorial Stadium; Minneapolis, MN	L 10–21	63,641	
October 22	Penn State*		Memorial Stadium; Champaign, IL	W 10–8	51,459	
October 29	at No. 15 Purdue		Ross–Ade Stadium; West Lafayette, IN (rivalry)	W 14–12	48,625	
November 5	at Michigan		Michigan Stadium; Ann Arbor, MI (rivalry)	L 7–8	63,665	
November 12	Wisconsin		Memorial Stadium; Champaign, IL	W 35–14	48,163	
November 19	at Northwestern		Dyche Stadium; Evanston, IL (rivalry)	L 7–14	51,782	
*Non-conference game; Rankings from AP Poll released prior to the game; Source:
