= 1960 Iowa Hawkeyes football team =

American college football season

1960 Iowa Hawkeyes football
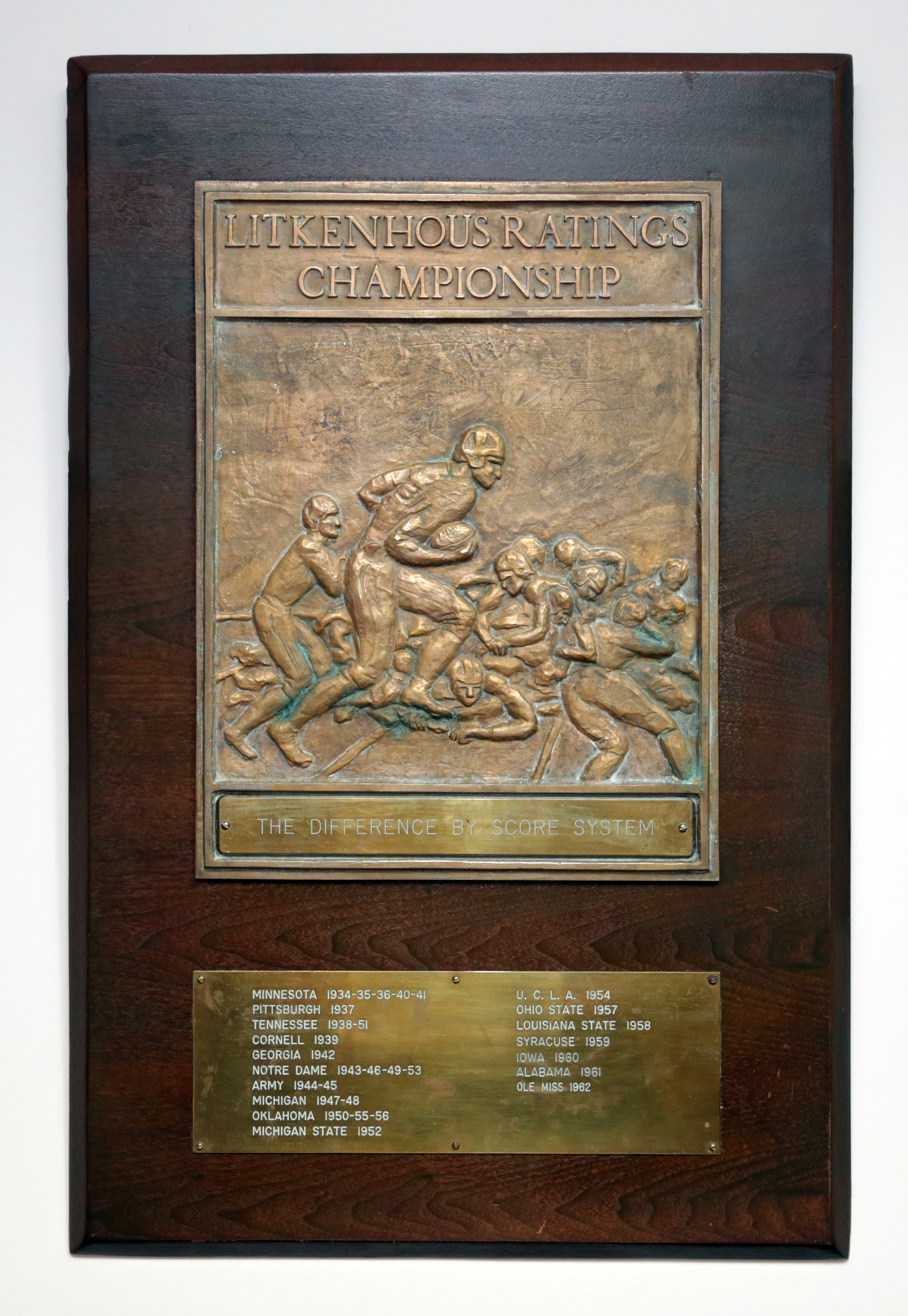

National champion (Litkenhous, Boand, Berryman QPRS, Sagarin, and Billingsley) Big Ten co-champion
- Conference: Big Ten Conference

Ranking
- Coaches: No. 2
- AP: No. 3
- Record: 8–1 (5–1 Big Ten)
- Head coach: Forest Evashevski (9th season)
- MVP: Bernie Wyatt
- Captain: Jerry Mauren
- Home stadium: Iowa Stadium

1960 Big Ten Conference football standings
	Conf.					Overall
Team	W		L		T	W		L		T
No. 1 Minnesota +	6	–	1	–	0	8	–	2	–	0
No. 3 Iowa +	5	–	1	–	0	8	–	1	–	0
No. 8 Ohio State	5	–	2	–	0	7	–	2	–	0
No. 15 Michigan State	4	–	2	–	0	6	–	2	–	1
Illinois	3	–	4	–	0	5	–	4	–	0
Michigan	3	–	4	–	0	5	–	4	–	0
Northwestern	3	–	4	–	0	5	–	4	–	0
No. 19 Purdue	3	–	4	–	0	4	–	4	–	1
Wisconsin	2	–	5	–	0	4	–	5	–	0
Indiana	0	–	7	–	0	1	–	8	–	0
+ – Conference co-champions; Rankings from AP Poll

The 1960 Iowa Hawkeyes football team was an American football team that represented the University of Iowa as a member of the Big Ten Conference during the 1960 Big Ten football season. In their ninth and final season under head coach Forest Evashevski, the Hawkeyes compiled an 8–1 record (5–1 in conference games), tied with Minnesota. for the Big Ten championship, and outscored opponents by a total of 234 to 108. They opened the season with six consecutive wins over ranked opponents, as eight of Iowa's nine opponents were ranked, and the ninth was Notre Dame. The only loss was to eventual national champion Minnesota The Big Ten voted to send Minnesota to the Rose Bowl over Iowa.

The Hawkeyes were ranked No. 2 in the final UPI poll and No. 3 in the final AP poll, but were ranked No. 1 in the season's final Litkenhous Ratings and were awarded the Litkenhous national championship trophy. They have also been declared the national champion by the Boand System, Berryman QPRS, Sagarin Ratings, and Billingsley Report.

The 1960 Hawkeyes gained 2,284 rushing yards and 511 passing yards. On defense, they gave up 1,492 rushing yards and 573 passing yards. The team featured the strongest rushing attack in Iowa history with an average of 252.8 rushing yards per game. They also had the fifth best scoring defense in modern Iowa history, allowing an average of 12.0 points per game.

The team's statistical leaders included halfback Larry Ferguson (665 rushing yards), quarterback Wilburn Hollis (22-of-62 passing for 289 yards, 68 points scored), and Felton Rogers (8 receptions for 96 yards). Ferguson and guard Mark Manders were selected by the Football Writers Association of America as first-team All-Americans. Ferguson, Manders and Hollis received first-team honors on the 1960 All-Big Ten Conference football team. Halfback Jerry Mauren was the team captain. Halfback Bernie Wyatt was selected as the team's most valuable player.

The team played its home games at Iowa Stadium in Iowa City, Iowa. Home attendance totaled 264,100 an average of 52,820 per game.

== Schedule ==
Date	Opponent	Rank	Site	TV	Result	Attendance	Source
September 24	No. 10 Oregon State*	No. 19	Iowa Stadium; Iowa City, IA		W 22–12	43,000	
October 1	at No. 6 Northwestern	No. 8	Dyche Stadium; Evanston, IL		W 42–0	48,109	
October 8	at No. 13 Michigan State	No. 3	Spartan Stadium; East Lansing, MI		W 27–15	74,493	
October 15	No. 12 Wisconsin	No. 2	Iowa Stadium; Iowa City, IA (rivalry)	ABC	W 28–21	57,000	
October 22	No. 16 Purdue^{†}	No. 1	Iowa Stadium; Iowa City, IA		W 21–14	59,200	
October 29	No. 19 Kansas*	No. 1	Iowa Stadium; Iowa City, IA		W 21–7	47,000	
November 5	at No. 3 Minnesota	No. 1	Memorial Stadium; Minneapolis, MN (rivalry)		L 10–27	65,610	
November 12	No. 3 Ohio State	No. 5	Iowa Stadium; Iowa City, IA	ABC	W 35–12	57,900	
November 19	at Notre Dame*	No. 2	Notre Dame Stadium; Notre Dame, IN		W 28–0	54,146	
*Non-conference game; ^{†}Homecoming; Rankings from AP Poll released prior to the game; Source:

== Personnel ==
=== Players ===
The following players received varsity letters for their performance on the 1960 Iowa football team:

- John Calhoun, quarterback
- Richard Clauson, end
- William DiCindio, guard
- Larry Ferguson, halfback, 182 pounds
- Sammie Harris, halfback
- Al Hinton, tackle, 219 pounds
- Wilburn Hollis, quarterback, junior, No. 20, 200 pounds
- Lloyd Humphreys, center, 193 pounds
- Charlie Lee, tackle, 231 pounds
- Mark Manders, guard, 219 pounds
- Jerry Mauren, halfback, 164 pounds
- Earl McQuiston, tackle
- Tom Moore, quarterback, senior, No. 55
- Eugene Mosley, fullback
- William Perkins, end
- Dayton Perry, center, sophomore
- Emery Pudder, tackle
- Bill Ringer, guard
- Felton Rogers, end, 184 pounds
- Bob Russo, halfback
- Jim Sober, halfback, junior, No. 0
- Matt Szykowny, quarterback
- Sherwyn Thorson, guard, junior, No. 69, 210 pounds
- Olen Treadway, quarterback, senior, No. 22
- Donald Tucker, halfback
- William Van Buren, center
- David Watkins, end
- Bill Whisler, end, junior, No 81, 219 pounds
- Chester Williams, tackle
- Joe Williams, fullback, sophomore, 191 pounds
- James Winton
- Bernie Wyatt, halfback, senior, No. 45
- Bob Yauck, tackle
- Don Zinn, center, senior

=== Coaches and administrators ===
- Head coach - Forest Evashevski
- Assistant coaches = Lou Holtz

== Rankings ==
Ranking movements Legend: ██ Increase in ranking ██ Decrease in ranking ( ) = First-place votes
	Week											
Poll	Pre	1	2	3	4	5	6	7	8	9	10	Final
AP	15	19	8	3 (5)	2 (17)	1 (23)	1 (34)	1 (46)	5	2 (7)	2 (17 1/2)	3 (12 1/2)
Coaches						1 (10)						2

== Game summaries ==
=== No. 16 Purdue ===
#16 Purdue at #1 Iowa

Team	1	2	3	4	Total
No. 16 Boilermakers	0	0	7	7	14
• No. 1 Hawkeyes	0	14	7	0	21

- Date: October 22
- Location: Iowa Stadium

Scoring summary
Q2	IOWA	Hollis 1-yard run (Moore kick)	IOWA 7–0
Q2	IOWA	Dayton Perry 84-yard fumble return (Moore kick)	IOWA 14–0
Q3	IOWA	Hollis 6-yard run (Moore kick)	IOWA 21–0
Q3	PUR	Tiller 16-yard pass from Allen (Allen kick)	IOWA 21–7
Q4	PUR	Allen 1-yard run (Allen kick)	IOWA 21–14

=== at No. 3 Minnesota ===
#1 Iowa at #3 Minnesota

Team	1	2	3	4	Total
No. 1 Hawkeyes	3	0	7	0	10
• No. 3 Golden Gophers	7	0	6	14	27

- Date: November 5
- Location: Memorial Stadium, Minneapolis, MN
- Game attendance: 65,610
- Sources: Box Score and Game Story

Scoring summary
1	Minn	Munsey 7-yard run (Rogers kick)	Minn 7-0
1	Iowa	Moore 28-yard field goal	Minn 7-3
3	Iowa	Williams 20-yard run (Moore kick)	Iowa 10-7
3	Minn	Stephens 1-yard run (kick failed)	Minn 13-10
3	Minn	Hagberg 42-yard run (Rogers kick)	Minn 20-10
4	Minn	Salem 1-yard run (Rogers kick)	Minn 27-10

=== No. 3 Ohio State ===
#3 Ohio State at #5 Iowa

Team	1	2	3	4	Total
No. 3 Buckeyes	0	6	6	0	12
• No. 5 Hawkeyes	7	21	0	7	35

- Date: November 12
- Location: Iowa Stadium, Iowa City, Iowa
- Game attendance: 57,900
- Game weather: Clear, wind S 10 mph, 55 °F (13 °C)

Scoring summary
Q1	1:21	IOWA	Williams 48-yard run (Moore kick)	IOWA 7–0
Q2	13:29	OSU	Ferguson 1-yard run (kick failed)	IOWA 7–6
Q2	10:15	IOWA	Hollis 12-yard run (Moore kick)	IOWA 14–6
Q1	5:30	IOWA	Szykowny 1-yard run (Moore kick)	IOWA 21–6
Q2	0:37	IOWA	Williams 1-yard run (Moore kick)	IOWA 28–6
Q3	13:00	OSU	Matte 22-yard run (pass failed)	IOWA 28–12
Q4	14:08	IOWA	Ferguson 9-yard run (Moore kick)	IOWA 35–12

== 1961 NFL draft ==
Player	Position	Round	Pick	NFL club
Willie Fleming	Halfback	14	196	Pittsburgh Steelers
Bernard Wyatt	Back	19	258	Pittsburgh Steelers
