= 1960 Ohio State Buckeyes football team =

American college football season

1960 Ohio State Buckeyes football
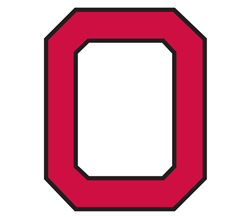
- Conference: Big Ten Conference

Ranking
- Coaches: No. 8
- AP: No. 8
- Record: 7–2 (5–2 Big Ten)
- Head coach: Woody Hayes (10th season)
- MVP: Tom Matte
- Captains: Jim Herbstreit; Jim Tyrer
- Home stadium: Ohio Stadium

1960 Big Ten Conference football standings
| | Conf. | | | | | Overall |
| Team | W | | L | | T | W | | L | | T |
|---|---|---|---|---|---|---|---|---|---|---|
| No. 1 Minnesota + | 6 | – | 1 | – | 0 | 8 | – | 2 | – | 0 |
| No. 3 Iowa + | 5 | – | 1 | – | 0 | 8 | – | 1 | – | 0 |
| No. 8 Ohio State | 5 | – | 2 | – | 0 | 7 | – | 2 | – | 0 |
| No. 15 Michigan State | 4 | – | 2 | – | 0 | 6 | – | 2 | – | 1 |
| Illinois | 3 | – | 4 | – | 0 | 5 | – | 4 | – | 0 |
| Michigan | 3 | – | 4 | – | 0 | 5 | – | 4 | – | 0 |
| Northwestern | 3 | – | 4 | – | 0 | 5 | – | 4 | – | 0 |
| No. 19 Purdue | 3 | – | 4 | – | 0 | 4 | – | 4 | – | 1 |
| Wisconsin | 2 | – | 5 | – | 0 | 4 | – | 5 | – | 0 |
| Indiana | 0 | – | 7 | – | 0 | 1 | – | 8 | – | 0 |
+ – Conference co-champions; Rankings from AP Poll

The 1960 Ohio State Buckeyes football team was an American football team that represented the Ohio State University as a member of the Big Ten Conference during the 1960 Big Ten season. In their tenth year under head coach Woody Hayes, the Buckeyes compiled a 7–2 record (5–2 in conference games), finished in third place in the Big Ten, and outscored opponents by a total of 209 to 90. Against ranked opponents, the Buckeyes defeated No. 4 Illinois, No. 11 Wisconsin, and No. 10 Michigan State, but lost to No. 5 Iowa. They were ranked No. 9 in the final AP poll.

The team's statistical leaders included quarterback Tom Matte (737 passing yards, 52.6% completion percentage), fullback Bob Ferguson (853 rushing yards, 5.3 yards per carry, 13 touchdowns), and end Chuck Bryant (17 receptions for 336 yards, 19.8 per reception). Three Ohio State players received first-team honors on the 1960 All-Big Ten Conference football team: Matte (AP-1, UPI-1); Ferguson (AP-1, UPI-1); and tackle Jim Tyrer (AP-2, UPI-1).

The team played its home games at Ohio Stadium in Columbus, Ohio.

== Schedule ==
| Date | Opponent | Rank | Site | Result | Attendance | Source |
|---|---|---|---|---|---|---|
| September 24 | SMU* | No. 20 | Ohio Stadium; Columbus, OH | W 24–0 | 82,496 | |
| October 1 | USC* | No. 9 | Ohio Stadium; Columbus, OH | W 20–0 | 83,204 | |
| October 8 | at No. 4 Illinois | No. 5 | Memorial Stadium; Champaign, IL (Illibuck) | W 34–7 | 71,119 | |
| October 15 | at Purdue | No. 3 | Ross–Ade Stadium; West Lafayette, IN | L 21–24 | 46,284 | |
| October 22 | No. 11 Wisconsin^{†} | No. 9 | Ohio Stadium; Columbus, OH | W 34–7 | 83,246 | |
| October 29 | at No. 10 Michigan State | No. 8 | Spartan Stadium; East Lansing, MI | W 21–10 | 76,520 | |
| November 5 | Indiana | No. 5 | Ohio Stadium; Columbus, OH | W 36–7 | 81,530 | |
| November 12 | at No. 5 Iowa | No. 3 | Iowa Stadium; Iowa City, IA | L 12–35 | 57,900 | |
| November 19 | Michigan | No. 10 | Ohio Stadium; Columbus, OH (rivalry) | W 7–0 | 83,107 | |
*Non-conference game; ^{†}Homecoming; Rankings from AP Poll released prior to the game; Source:

== Game summaries ==
=== SMU ===
| Team | 1 | 2 | 3 | 4 | Total |
|---|---|---|---|---|---|
| SMU | 0 | 0 | 0 | 0 | 0 |
| • Ohio St | 7 | 14 | 3 | 0 | 24 |

- Date: September 24
- Location: Ohio Stadium, Columbus, Ohio
- Game attendance: 82,496

Scoring summary
| Q1 | 1:24 | OHST | Bryant 15 yard pass from Matte (Jones kick) | OHST 7–0 |
| Q2 | 13:16 | OHST | Ferguson 2 yard run (Jones kick) | OHST 14–0 |
| Q2 | :42 | OHST | Detrick 1 yard run (Jones kick) | OHST 21–0 |
| Q3 | 7:54 | OHST | Jones 30 yard field goal | OHST 24–0 |

=== USC ===
USC Trojans (0–2) at #9 Ohio State Buckeyes (1–0)

| Quarter | 1 | 2 | 3 | 4 | Total |
|---|---|---|---|---|---|
| USC | 0 | 0 | 0 | 0 | 0 |
| Ohio St | 6 | 7 | 0 | 7 | 20 |

at Ohio Stadium, Columbus, Ohio

- Date: October 1, 1960
- Game weather: Sunny, 64 °F (18 °C)
- Game attendance: 83,204
- Box Score

| Team | Category | Player | Statistics |
|---|---|---|---|
| USC | Passing | Ben Charles | 4/8, 46 Yds, 2 INT |
| USC | Rushing | Ben Wilson | 3 Rush, 29 Yds |
| USC | Receiving | Marlin McKeever | 1 Rec, 29 Yds |
| Ohio St | Passing | Tom Matte | 6/11, 78 Yds, INT |
| Ohio St | Rushing | Bob Ferguson | 20 Rush, 157 Yds, 3 TD |
| Ohio St | Receiving | Chuck Bryant | 2 Rec, 28 Yds |

Scoring summary

| Quarter | Time | Drive | | | Team | Scoring information | Score | |
| Quarter | Time | Plays | Yards | TOP | Team | Scoring information | USC | OSU |
|---|---|---|---|---|---|---|---|---|
| 1 | 8:25 | 1 | 74 | 0:19 | Ohio St | Ben Ferguson 74-yard touchdown run, Ben Jones kick no good (blocked) | 0 | 6 |
| 2 | 4:36 | 8 | 57 | 4:10 | Ohio St | Bob Ferguson 2-yard touchdown run, Ben Jones kick good | 0 | 13 |
| 4 | 4:36 | 9 | 75 | 4:12 | Ohio St | Bob Ferguson 19-yard touchdown run, Ben Jones kick good | 0 | 20 |
| "TOP" = time of possession. For other American football terms, see Glossary of American football. | | | | | | | 0 | 20 |

=== At Illinois ===
| Team | 1 | 2 | 3 | 4 | Total |
|---|---|---|---|---|---|
| • Ohio St | 0 | 13 | 14 | 7 | 34 |
| Illinois | 0 | 0 | 0 | 7 | 7 |

- Date: October 8
- Location: Memorial Stadium, Champaign, Illinois
- Game attendance: 71,119

Scoring summary
| Q2 | 14:55 | OHST | Detrick 2 yard run (kick failed) | OHST 6–0 |
| Q2 | :39 | OHST | Ferguson 2 yard run (Jones kick) | OHST 13–0 |
| Q3 | 14:34 | OHST | Wentz 100 yard kickoff return (Jones kick) | OHST 20–0 |
| Q3 | 5:23 | OHST | Matte 57 yard run (Jones kick) | OHST 27–0 |
| Q4 | 9:48 | OHST | Klein 42 yard run (Jones kick) | OHST 34–0 |
| Q4 | 4:02 | ILL | Brown 3 yard run (Wood kick) | OHST 34–7 |

=== Purdue ===
| Team | 1 | 2 | 3 | 4 | Total |
|---|---|---|---|---|---|
| Ohio State | 0 | 14 | 7 | 0 | 21 |
| • Purdue | 7 | 7 | 10 | 0 | 24 |

- Date: October 15
- Location: Ross–Ade Stadium, West Lafayette IN
- Game weather: Cloudy, wind NW 11-12 mph, 66 °F (19 °C)

Scoring summary
| Q1 | 11:25 | PUR | Jones 3 yard run (Allen kick) | PUR 0–7 |
| Q2 | 11:05 | PUR | Jones 3 yard run (Allen kick) | PUR 0–14 |
| Q2 | 8:34 | OSU | Ferguson 5 yard run (Jones kick) | PUR 7–14 |
| Q2 | 3:10 | OSU | Matte 31 yard pass to Perdue (Jones kick) | TIED 14–14 |
| Q3 | 9:08 | PUR | Allen 32 yard field goal | PUR 14–17 |
| Q3 | 2:14 | OSU | Ferguson 1 yard run (Jones kick) | OSU 17–21 |
| Q3 | 0:02 | PUR | Jones 32 yard run (Allen kick) | PUR 24–21 |

=== Wisconsin ===
| Team | 1 | 2 | 3 | 4 | Total |
|---|---|---|---|---|---|
| Wisconsin | 0 | 7 | 0 | 0 | 7 |
| • Ohio St | 14 | 0 | 0 | 20 | 34 |

- Date: October 21
- Location: Ohio Stadium, Columbus, Ohio
- Game attendance: 83,246
- Game weather: Clear; 57 °F (14 °C); wind 10–15 mph SW

Scoring summary
| Q1 | 4:00 | OHST | Klein 5 yard pass from Matte (Young kick) | OHST 7–0 |
| Q1 | :54 | OHST | Ferguson 52 yard run (Young kick) | OHST 14–0 |
| Q2 | 1:27 | WIS | Wiesner 5 yard run (Kunesh kick) | OHST 14–7 |
| Q4 | 14:49 | OHST | Ferguson 2 yard run (Young kick) | OHST 21–7 |
| Q4 | 7:53 | OHST | Detrick 2 yard run (Young kick) | OHST 28–7 |
| Q4 | 1:17 | OHST | Bryant 53 yard pass from Matte (kick failed) | OHST 34–7 |

=== At Michigan State ===
| Team | 1 | 2 | 3 | 4 | Total |
|---|---|---|---|---|---|
| • Ohio St | 0 | 14 | 7 | 0 | 21 |
| Michigan St | 0 | 3 | 0 | 7 | 10 |

- Date: October 29
- Location: Spartan Stadium, East Lansing, Michigan
- Game attendance: 76,520
- Game weather: Cloudy; 60 °F (16 °C); wind 12 mph SE

Scoring summary
| Q2 | 9:04 | OHST | Klein 46 yard run (kick failed) | OHST 6–0 |
| Q2 | 3:07 | OHST | Ferguson 3 yard run (Klein pass from Matte)n | OHST 14–0 |
| Q2 | :55 | MSU | Brandstatter 25 yard field goal | OHST 14–3 |
| Q3 | 3:07 | OHST | Middleton 25 yard pass from Matte (Jones kick) | OHST 21–3 |
| Q4 | 3:46 | MSU | Adderley 17 yard pass from Wilson (Brandstatter kick) | OHST 21–10 |

=== Indiana ===
| Team | 1 | 2 | 3 | 4 | Total |
|---|---|---|---|---|---|
| Indiana | 0 | 0 | 0 | 7 | 7 |
| • Ohio St | 7 | 20 | 7 | 2 | 36 |

- Date: November 5
- Location: Ohio Stadium, Columbus, Ohio
- Game attendance: 81,530
- Game weather: Cloudy; 42 °F (6 °C)

Scoring summary
| Q1 | 9:51 | OHST | Ferguson 3 yard run (Jones kick) | OHST 7–0 |
| Q2 | 14:20 | OHST | Bryant 2 yard pass from Matte (Jones kick) | OHST 14–0 |
| Q2 | 3:01 | OHST | Klein 5 yard pass from Matte (kick blocked) | OHST 20–0 |
| Q2 | :00 | OHST | Bryant 36 yard pass from Matte (Jones kick) | OHST 27–0 |
| Q3 | 4:43 | OHST | Klein 4 yard run (Jones kick) | OHST 34–0 |
| Q4 | 11:30 | OHST | Safety, punt snap out of end zone | OHST 36–0 |
| Q4 | 3:02 | IND | Quinter 22 yard pass from Moore (Nochol kick) | OHST 36–7 |

=== At Iowa ===
| Team | 1 | 2 | 3 | 4 | Total |
|---|---|---|---|---|---|
| Ohio State | 0 | 6 | 6 | 0 | 12 |
| • Iowa | 7 | 21 | 0 | 7 | 35 |

- Date: November 12
- Location: Iowa Stadium, Iowa City, Iowa
- Game attendance: 57,900
- Game weather: Clear, wind S 10 mph, 55 °F (13 °C)

Scoring summary
| Q1 | 1:21 | IOWA | Williams 48 yard run (Moore kick) | IOWA 0–7 |
| Q2 | 13:29 | OSU | Ferguson 1 yard run (kick failed) | IOWA 6–7 |
| Q2 | 10:15 | IOWA | Hollis 12 yard run (Moore kick) | IOWA 6–14 |
| Q1 | 5:30 | IOWA | Szykowny 1 yard run (Moore kick) | IOWA 6–21 |
| Q2 | 0:37 | IOWA | Williams 1 yard run (Moore kick) | IOWA 6–28 |
| Q3 | 13:00 | OSU | Matte 22 yard run (pass failed) | IOWA 12–28 |
| Q4 | 14:08 | IOWA | Ferguson 9 yard run (Moore kick) | IOWA 12–35 |

=== Michigan ===
| Team | 1 | 2 | 3 | 4 | Total |
|---|---|---|---|---|---|
| Michigan | 0 | 0 | 0 | 0 | 0 |
| • Ohio St | 0 | 0 | 0 | 7 | 7 |

- Date: November 19
- Location: Ohio Stadium, Columbus, Ohio
- Game attendance: 83,107
- Game weather: Cloudy; 41 °F (5 °C)

Scoring summary
| Q4 | 12:55 | OHST | Ferguson 17 yard run (Jones kick) | OHST 7–0 |

== Roster ==
1960 Ohio State Buckeyes football team roster
Players
Coaches
Offense

| Pos. | # | Name | Class |
|---|---|---|---|
| C | 53 | Bill Armstrong | So |
| QB | 21 | Michael Benis | Sr |
| E | 88 | Charles Bryant | Jr |
| C | 52 | Robert Butts | So |
| C | 57 | William Clymer | So |
| C | 59 | Michael Coburn | Jr |
| FB | 32 | Roger Detrick | Jr |
| HB | 42 | David Eckard | So |
| G | 56 | John Farrall | Sr |
| FB | 46 | Bob Ferguson | Jr |
| OT | 71 | Alan Fiers | Sr |
| G | 66 | Charles Foreman | Jr |
| G | 69 | Rodney Foster | So |
| FB | 33 | David Francis | So |
| HB | 35 | William German | Sr |
| HB | 47 | Gary Hansley | Jr |
| HB | 18 | Van Allen Hardman | Jr |
| G | 67 | Gabriel Harlman | Sr |
| C | 65 | Oscar Hauer | Sr |
| HB | 12 | Richard Haupt | Jr |
| HB | 45 | Jim Herbstreit (C) | Sr |
| HB | 14 | Brice Hess | Jr |
| HB | 28 | William Hess | So |
| HB | 49 | Ronald Houck | Jr |
| G | 64 | Michael Ingram | Jr |
| OT | 72 | Charles Jentes | Sr |
| HB | 16 | Kenneth Johnson | So |
| FB | 30 | David Katternhenrich | So |
| HB | 19 | Robert Klein | So |
| OT | 61 | Raymond Krstolic | So |
| HB | 48 | Karl Kumler | So |
| HB | 17 | Howard Lambert | Jr |
| OT | 70 | Richard Laskoski | So |
| OT | 60 | Frederic Lehr | So |
| C | 54 | James Lindner | Sr |
| FB | 36 | Robert Lindner | So |
| QB | 23 | Robert Lister | Jr |
| HB | 43 | Richard Mangiamelle | So |
| E | 91 | Paul Martin | Jr |
| QB | 41 | Tom Matte | Sr |
| OT | 74 | James Matz | Sr |
| E | 80 | Robert Middleton | So |
| G | 68 | Gary Moeller | So |
| QB | 26 | Bill Mrukowski | So |
| QB | 25 | John Mummey | So |
| E | 87 | Tom Perdue | Jr |
| E | 89 | Elwood Rayford | So |
| OT | 79 | Robert Risch | So |
| OT | 75 | Jack Roberts | Jr |
| OT | 76 | Daryl Sanders | So |
| E | 81 | Larry Stephens | Jr |
| G | 63 | Aaron Swartz | So |
| E | 85 | Sam Tidmore | Jr |
| OT | 78 | George Tolford | Sr |
| OT | 77 | Jim Tyrer (C) | Sr |
| HB | 44 | Ed Ulmer | So |
| C | 50 | Jerry Vanscoy | So |
| C | 51 | Thomas Varner | Sr |
| OT | 73 | Robert Vogel | So |
| C | 55 | Don Vogelgesang | Sr |
| QB | 22 | Jack Wallace | Jr |
| C | 58 | Jene Watkins | Jr |
| HB | 15 | William Wentz | Sr |
| E | 82 | George Wittmer | Jr |
| G | 62 | Don Young | Sr |

Defense

| Pos. | # | Name | Class |

Special teams

| Pos. | # | Name | Class |
|---|---|---|---|
| K | 38 | Stewart Baffer | So |
| K | 20 | Ben Jones | So |

Head coach

- Woody Hayes

Coordinators/assistant coaches

- Lyal Clark
- Ernie Godfrey
- Gordon Larson
- Esco Sarkkinen
- Bo Schembechler
- Gene Slaughter
  (Backfield)
- Harry Strobel

Legend

- (C) Team captain
- (S) Suspended
- (I) Ineligible
- Injured
- Redshirt

Roster
Last update: 2018-Dec-15

== 1961 pro draftees ==
| Player | Draft | Round | Pick | Position | NFL club |
|---|---|---|---|---|---|
| Tom Matte | NFL | 1 | 7 | Running back | Baltimore Colts |
| Tom Matte | AFL | 5 | 37 | Running back | New York Titans |
| Jim Tyrer | AFL | 3 | 22 | Tackle | Dallas Texans |
| Jim Tyrer | NFL | 14 | 188 | Tackle | Chicago Bears |
| Jerry Fields | NFL | 13 | 179 | Linebacker | New York Giants |
| Ernie Wright | NFL | 15 | 200 | Tackle | Los Angeles Rams |
| George Tolford | NFL | 18 | 241 | Tackle | Washington Redskins |
| Mike Ingram | NFL | 20 | 269 | Guard | Washington Redskins |
