= 1960 Michigan State Spartans football team =

American college football season

1960 Michigan State Spartans football
- Conference: Big Ten Conference

Ranking
- Coaches: No. 13
- AP: No. 15
- Record: 6–2–1 (4–2 Big Ten)
- Head coach: Duffy Daugherty (7th season)
- MVP: Tom Wilson
- Captains: Herb Adderley; Fred Arbanas; Fred Boylen
- Home stadium: Spartan Stadium

1960 Big Ten Conference football standings
	Conf.					Overall
Team	W		L		T	W		L		T
No. 1 Minnesota +	6	–	1	–	0	8	–	2	–	0
No. 3 Iowa +	5	–	1	–	0	8	–	1	–	0
No. 8 Ohio State	5	–	2	–	0	7	–	2	–	0
No. 15 Michigan State	4	–	2	–	0	6	–	2	–	1
Illinois	3	–	4	–	0	5	–	4	–	0
Michigan	3	–	4	–	0	5	–	4	–	0
Northwestern	3	–	4	–	0	5	–	4	–	0
No. 19 Purdue	3	–	4	–	0	4	–	4	–	1
Wisconsin	2	–	5	–	0	4	–	5	–	0
Indiana	0	–	7	–	0	1	–	8	–	0
+ – Conference co-champions; Rankings from AP Poll

The 1960 Michigan State Spartans football team represented Michigan State University in the 1960 Big Ten Conference football season. In their seventh season under head coach Duffy Daugherty, the Spartans compiled a 6–2–1 overall record (4–2 against Big Ten opponents), finished in fourth place in the Big Ten Conference, and were ranked No. 15 in the final AP poll.

Halfback Herb Adderly was selected by the United Press International as a first-team player on the 1960 All-Big Ten Conference football team.

The 1960 Spartans won all three of their annual rivalry games. In the annual Indiana–Michigan State football rivalry game, the Spartans defeated the Hoosiers by a 35 to 0 score. In the Notre Dame rivalry game, the Spartans defeated the Fighting Irish by a 21 to 0 score. And, in the annual Michigan–Michigan State football rivalry game, the Spartans defeated the Wolverines by a 24 to 17 score. In non-conference play, the Spartans tied Pittsburgh, 7–7, and defeated Detroit, 43–15.

== Schedule ==
Date	Opponent	Rank	Site	Result	Attendance	Source
September 24	at No. 17 Pittsburgh*	No. 6	Pitt Stadium; Pittsburgh, PA	T 7–7	46,140	
October 1	Michigan		Spartan Stadium; East Lansing, MI (rivalry)	W 24–17	76,490	
October 8	No. 3 Iowa	No. 13	Spartan Stadium; East Lansing, MI	L 15–27	74,493	
October 15	at Notre Dame*	No. 14	Notre Dame Stadium; Notre Dame, IN (rivalry)	W 21–0	59,133	
October 22	at Indiana	No. 13	Seventeenth Street Football Stadium; Bloomington, IN (rivalry)	W 35–0	32,322	
October 29	No. 8 Ohio State^{†}	No. 10	Spartan Stadium; East Lansing, MI	L 10–21	76,520	
November 5	at Purdue	No. 17	Ross–Ade Stadium; West Lafayette, IN	W 17–13	38,481	
November 12	at Northwestern	No. 13	Dyche Stadium; Evanston, IL	W 21–18	47,022	
November 19	Detroit*	No. 12	Spartan Stadium; East Lansing, MI	W 43–15	49,102	
*Non-conference game; ^{†}Homecoming; Rankings from AP Poll released prior to the game; Source:

== Roster ==
1960 Michigan State Spartans football team roster
Players			Coaches
Offense: Pos. / # / Name / Class; FB / / George Saimes / So	Defense: Pos. / # / Name / Class	Special teams: Pos. / # / Name / Class	Head coach: Duffy Daugherty; Coordinators/assistant coaches Legend: (C) Team captain; (S) Suspended; (I) Ineligible; Injured; Redshirt
