= 1960 Michigan Wolverines football team =

American college football season

1960 Michigan Wolverines football
- Conference: Big Ten Conference
- Record: 5–4 (3–4 Big Ten)
- Head coach: Bump Elliott (2nd season)
- MVP: Dennis Fitzgerald
- Captain: Gerald Smith
- Home stadium: Michigan Stadium

1960 Big Ten Conference football standings
	Conf.					Overall
Team	W		L		T	W		L		T
No. 1 Minnesota +	6	–	1	–	0	8	–	2	–	0
No. 3 Iowa +	5	–	1	–	0	8	–	1	–	0
No. 8 Ohio State	5	–	2	–	0	7	–	2	–	0
No. 15 Michigan State	4	–	2	–	0	6	–	2	–	1
Illinois	3	–	4	–	0	5	–	4	–	0
Michigan	3	–	4	–	0	5	–	4	–	0
Northwestern	3	–	4	–	0	5	–	4	–	0
No. 19 Purdue	3	–	4	–	0	4	–	4	–	1
Wisconsin	2	–	5	–	0	4	–	5	–	0
Indiana	0	–	7	–	0	1	–	8	–	0
+ – Conference co-champions; Rankings from AP Poll

The 1960 Michigan Wolverines football team was an American football team that represented the University of Michigan in the 1960 Big Ten Conference football season. In its second year under head coach Bump Elliott, Michigan compiled a 5–4 record (3–4 against conference opponents), finished in fifth place in the Big Ten, and outscored opponents by a combined total of 133 to 84.

Gerald Smith was the team captain and was selected by both the Associated Press and United Press International as the second-team center on the 1960 All-Big Ten Conference football team. Halfback Dennis Fitzgerald received the team's most valuable player award.

The team's statistical leaders included Dave Glinka with 755 passing yards, Bennie McRae with 342 rushing yards, Robert Johnson with 230 receiving yards, and Dave Raimey with 36 points scored.

== Schedule ==
Date	Opponent	Site	Result	Attendance	Source
September 24	Oregon*	Michigan Stadium; Ann Arbor, MI	W 21–0	48,021	
October 1	at Michigan State	Spartan Stadium; East Lansing, MI (rivalry)	L 17–24	76,490	
October 8	Duke*	Michigan Stadium; Ann Arbor, MI	W 31–6	77,183	
October 15	Northwestern	Michigan Stadium; Ann Arbor, MI (rivalry)	W 14–7	63,027	
October 22	No. 6 Minnesota^{†}	Michigan Stadium; Ann Arbor, MI (Little Brown Jug)	L 0–10	71,752	
October 29	at Wisconsin	Camp Randall Stadium; Madison, WI	L 13–16	57,629	
November 5	Illinois	Michigan Stadium; Ann Arbor, MI (rivalry)	W 8–7	63,665	
November 12	Indiana	Michigan Stadium; Ann Arbor, MI	W 29–7	51,584–51,936	
November 19	at No. 10 Ohio State	Ohio Stadium; Columbus, OH (rivalry)	L 0–7	83,107	
*Non-conference game; ^{†}Homecoming; Rankings from AP Poll released prior to the game

== Season summary ==
=== Preseason ===
The 1959 Michigan Wolverines football team compiled a 4–5 in its first season under head coach Bump Elliott. Several players from the 1959 team were lost to graduation, including fullback and most valuable player Tony Rio, halfback Fred Julian, quarterback Stan Noskin, and 1959 team captain George Genyk.

In May 1960, end Bill Freehan received the team's Meyer Morton Award as the most improved player in the team's spring practice.

In June 1960, halfback Jack Strobel received the team's John Maulbetsch Award on the basis of "need, scholastic ability, together with a capacity, promise and desire for leadership and success."

=== Oregon ===
Week 1: Oregon at Michigan

Team	1	2	3	4	Total
Oregon	0	0	0	0	0
• Michigan	7	0	7	7	21

- Date: September 24
- Location: Ann Arbor, MI
- Game attendance: 50,889

Scoring summary
1	MICH	Dave Raimey 25-yard run (John Halsted kick)	MICH 7–0
3	MICH	Scott Maentz 9-yard pass from Dave Glinka (Halsted kick)	MICH 14–0
4	MICH	George Mans 10-yard pass from Glinka (Halsted kick)	MICH 21–0

On September 24, Michigan opened its season with a 21–0 victory over Oregon. The game was played before a crowd of 50,889 at Michigan Stadium. On the opening drive, Michigan drove 53 yards for a touchdown. Sophomore halfback Dave Raimey ran 25 yards for the score on the first carry of his collegiate career. Sophomore quarterback Dave Glinka, also playing in his first collegiate game, threw touchdown passes of 10 yards to George Mans and nine yards to Scott Maentz. Michigan out-gained the Ducks by a total of 377 yards to 135. Mans caught four passes for 65 yards and, playing on defense as well, recovered an Oregon fumble. Ken Tureaud led the Wolverines with 58 rushing yards.

=== Michigan State ===
Week 2: Michigan at Michigan State

Team	1	2	3	4	Total
Michigan	7	10	0	0	17
• Michigan State	7	7	3	7	24

- Date: October 1
- Location: East Lansing, MI
- Game attendance: 76,490

Scoring summary
1		MICH	Dave Raimey 2-yard run (John Halsted kick)	MICH 7–0
1		MSU	Tom Wilson 6-yard run (Art Brandstatter kick)	TIE 7–7
2		MICH	Halsted 35-yard field goal	MICH 10–7
2	9:46	MSU	Ballman 4-yard run (Brandstatter kick)	MSU 14–10
2	9:32	MICH	Dennis Fitzgerald 99-yard kickoff return (Halsted kick)	MICH 17–14
3		MSU	Brandstatter 32-yard field goal	TIE 17–17
4		MSU	Carol Charon 3-yard run (Brandstatter kick)	MSU 24–17

On October 1, Michigan lost its annual rivalry game with Michigan State, 24–17, before a record-setting crowd of 76,490 at Spartan Stadium in East Lansing, Michigan. Michigan held a 17–14 lead at halftime. The highlight of the first half was a 99-yard kickoff return by Michigan halfback Dennis Fitzgerald. In a game that saw seven changes in the lead, Michigan State fullback Carl Charon scored the game-winning touchdown on a three-yard run with less than three minutes remaining in the game. In the Detroit Free Press, Lyall Smith called it one of the most sensational matches in the history of the rivalry: "It had everything. It had more than everything. It was one of collegiate football's greatest days and, if you don't believe it, wait about 20 years from now. They'll still be talking about it."

=== Duke ===
Week 3: Duke at Michigan

Team	1	2	3	4	Total
Duke	0	6	0	0	6
• Michigan	6	7	6	12	31

- Date: October 8
- Location: Ann Arbor, MI
- Game attendance: 77,183

Scoring summary
1	MICH	Dennis Fitzgerald 1-yard run (kick failed)	MICH 6–0
2	DUKE	Mark Leggett 1-yard run (kick failed)	TIE 6–6
2	MICH	Dave Raimey 5-yard run (John Halsted kick)	MICH 13–6
3	MICH	Fitzgerald 5-yard pass from Dave Glinka (kick failed)	MICH 19–6
4	MICH	Raimey 18-yard run (pass failed)	MICH 25–6
4	MICH	Jack Strobel 2-yard run (pass failed)	MICH 31–0

On October 8, Michigan defeated Duke, 31–6, before a crowd of 77,183 at Michigan Stadium. Sophomore halfback Dave Raimey rushed for 114 yards and two touchdowns. Dennis Fitzgerald also scored twice on a one-yard run and five-yard pass reception.

=== Northwestern ===
Week 4: Northwestern at Michigan

Team	1	2	3	4	Total
Northwestern	0	0	0	7	7
• Michigan	0	6	0	8	14

- Date: October 15
- Location: Ann Arbor, MI
- Game attendance: 64,514

Scoring summary
2	MICH	Bob Johnson 35-yard pass from Dave Glinka (kick failed)	MICH 6–0
4	NW	Al Kimbrough 19-yard run (Stock kick)	NW 7–6
4	MICH	Bill Tunnicliff 1-yard run (Bennie McRae pass from Glinka)	MICH 14–7

On October 15, Michigan defeated Northwestern, 14–7, before a crowd of 64,514 at Michigan Stadium. Michigan took a 6–0 lead in the second quarter on a 35-yard touchdown pass from Dave Glinka to Bob Johnson, but John Halsted's extra-point kick went wide. Early in the fourth quarter, Dave Raimey fumbled a punt at the Wolverines' 27-yard line. On fourth-and-two, Northwestern took the lead on a 19-yard pitchout and run by Al Kimbrough. Glinka then completed a 50-yard pass to Johnson at the one-yard line. The pass was nearly intercepted by two Northwestern defenders, but the ball was bumped from the defenders into Johnson's hands. Fullback Bill Tunnicliff then ran the remaining yard for the game-winning touchdown, and Glinka passed to Bennie McRae for a two-point conversion. After the game, Northwestern coach Ara Parseghian credited Michigan's line: "Michigan's line is much better than we expected and much faster than last year."

=== Minnesota ===
Week 5: Minnesota at Michigan

Team	1	2	3	4	Total
• Minnesota	0	7	0	3	10
Michigan	0	0	0	0	0

- Date: October 22
- Location: Ann Arbor, MI
- Game attendance: 69,352

Scoring summary
2	MINN	Jim Rogers 2-yard run (Rogers kick)	MINN 7–0
4	MINN	Rogers 12-yard field goal	MINN 10–0

On October 22, Michigan lost to Minnesota by a 10–0 score in the annual Little Brown Jug game before a crowd of 69,352 at Michigan Stadium. Michigan turned the ball over seven times on five fumbles and two interceptions. Jim Rogers scored all 10 points for Minnesota on a two-yard run, an extra point, and a field goal. After the game, Minnesota players carried coach Murray Warmath off the field.

=== Wisconsin ===
Week 6: Michigan at Wisconsin

Team	1	2	3	4	Total
Michigan	6	7	0	0	13
• Wisconsin	6	0	0	10	16

- Date: October 29
- Location: Madison, WI
- Game attendance: 57,629

Scoring summary
1	WIS	Ron Miller 1-yard run (kick failed)	WIS 6–0
1	MICH	Dave Raimey 1-yard run (kick failed)	TIE 6–6
2	MICH	Raimey 12-yard run (Bill Freehan kick)	MICH 13–6
4	WIS	John Fabry 1-yard run (Kunesh kick)	TIE 13–13
4	WIS	Jim Bakken 19-yard field goal	MICH 16–13

On October 29, Michigan lost to Wisconsin, 16–13, before a crowd of 57,629 at Camp Randall Stadium in Madison, Wisconsin. Michigan halfback Dave Raimey scored two rushing touchdowns in the first half to give Michigan a 13–6 lead at halftime. Jim Bakken kicked a game-winning 19-yard field goal with less than two minutes remaining in the game.

=== Illinois ===
Week 7: Illinois at Michigan

Team	1	2	3	4	Total
Illinois	7	0	0	0	7
• Michigan	0	8	13	8	29

- Date: November 5
- Location: Ann Arbor, MI
- Game attendance: 62,927

Scoring summary
1	ILL	Marshall Starks 4-yard pass from Johnny Easterbrook (Gerry Wood kick)	ILL 7–0
2	MICH	Bill Tunnicliff 1-yard run (Dennis Fitzgerald pass from Dave Glinka)	MICH 8–7

On November 5, Michigan defeated Illinois, 8–7, before a crowd of 62,927 at Michigan Stadium. The game matched brothers Bump Elliott and Pete Elliott, head coaches of the Wolverines and Illini. Illinois took a 7–0 lead on a four-yard pass from Johnny Easterbrook to Marshall Starks. In the second quarter, Michigan gambled on a fake punt on fourth-and-seven; Dave Glinka took the snap on the fake and threw for a 17-yard gain to Bob Johnson at Illinois' 26-yard line. The Wolverines' then drove to the one-yard line with Bill Tunnicliff scoring on a one-yard run. Glinka then passed to Fitzgerald for a two-point conversion, giving Michigan its winning margin of one point. Neither team scored in the second half.

=== Indiana ===
Week 8: Indiana at Michigan

Team	1	2	3	4	Total
Indiana	7	0	0	0	7
• Michigan	0	8	13	8	29

- Date: November 12
- Location: Ann Arbor, MI
- Game attendance: 51,936

Scoring summary
1		IND	Mike Lopa 58-yard run (Nichols kick)	IND 7–0
2	5:47	MICH	Scott Maentz 31-yard pass from Dave Glinka (Dennis Fitzgerald pass from Glinka)	MICH 8–7
3		MICH	Bill Tunnicliff 1-yard run (Glinka pass failed)	MICH 14–7
3		MICH	Ken Tureaud 5-yard run (Bill Freehan kick)	MICH 21–7
4		MICH	John Kowalik 3-yard run (Jim Zubkus pass from Don Hannah)	MICH 29–7

On November 12, Michigan defeated Indiana, 29–7, before a crowd of 51,936 at Michigan Stadium. Indiana, which had beaten Michigan in the prior two meetings, drove 85 yards on its opening possession, capped by a 58-yard run by Mike Lopa. Michigan took the lead in the second quarter on a 31-yard pass from Dave Glinka to Scott Maentz. The score was 8–7 at halftime, but Michigan held Indiana to only seven yards in the second half. Michigan scored three touchdowns in the second half on runs by Bill Tunnicliff, Ken Tureaud, and John Kowalik. Two of Michigan's second-half touchdowns were aided by Indiana fumbles inside its 20-yard line. Bennie McRae led Michigan's backs with 87 rushing yards. Substituting extensively, Michigan used 56 players in the game. Michigan's leading scorer Dave Raimey did not play due to an ankle injury.

The Indiana game did not count in the Big Ten standings as a penalty for Indiana's violation of recruiting rules. After the game, Indiana coach Phil Dickens commented on the talent disparity between the teams: "You don't go bear hunting with a switch."

=== Ohio State ===
Week 9: Michigan at Ohio State

Team	1	2	3	4	Total
Michigan	0	0	0	0	0
• Ohio State	0	0	0	7	7

- Date: November 19
- Location: Columbus, OH
- Game attendance: 83,107

Scoring summary
4	OHIO	Bob Ferguson 17-yard run (Ben Jones kick)	OHIO 7–0

On November 19, Michigan defeated Ohio State, 7–0, before a crowd of 83,107 at Ohio Stadium in Columbus, Ohio. The game was scoreless through three quarters. Early in the fourth quarter, Ohio State fullback Bob Ferguson ran 17 yards for the game-winning touchdown. Michigan's defense held the Buckeyes, the leading offense in the Big Ten with an average of 335 yards per game, to 168 yards of total offense. Michigan totaled 218 yards. After the game, Michigan coach Bump Elliott said: "We played good football, but we didn't get the big play. It was a shame to lose after playing so well." Ohio State coach Woody Hayes also praised Michigan's defense: "Michigan was the hardest-hitting defensive team we played all year."

=== Award season ===
No Michigan players were named to the 1960 All-America team. Team captain and center Gerald Smith received second-team honors from the Associated Press and United Press International on the 1960 All-Big Ten Conference football team.

At the school's annual football "bust" on November 28, senior halfback Dennis Fitzgerald received the team's most valuable player award.

== Personnel ==
=== Players ===
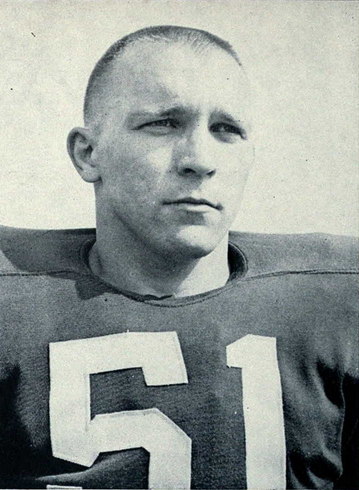
1960 team captain Gerald Smith

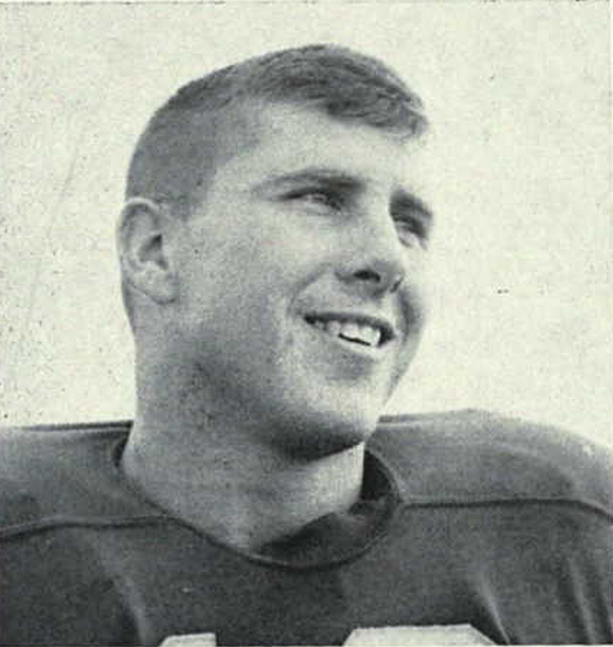
1960 MVP Dennis Fitzgerald

The following 38 players received varsity letters for their participation on the 1960 Michigan football team. Players who started at least four games are shown with their names in bold.

- Reid Bushong, 6'1", 185 pounds, senior Toledo, OH – started 1 game at left halfback
- Keith E. Cowan – end
- Guy Curtis – tackle
- Guy J. DeStefano – fullback
- Dennis Fitzgerald, 5'10", 185 pounds, senior, Ann Arbor, MI – started 2 games at right halfback
- Bill Freehan, 6'3", 195 pounds, end, Royal Oak, MI – started 2 games at left end
- Dave Glinka, 6'1", 198 pounds, quarterback, Toledo, OH – started 3 games at quarterback
- Todd Grant – center
- Lee Hall, 6'0", 208 pounds, junior, Charlotte, MI – started 2 games at left guard
- John Halsted, 6'2", 208 pounds, senior, Bay City, MI – started 1 game at left end
- Donald Hannah – quarterback
- Willard R. Hildebrand – tackle
- John Houtman – center
- **Thomas Jobson**, 6'0", 215 pounds, senior, Flint, MI – started 9 games at left tackle
- **Robert Johnson**, 6'2", 201 pounds, senior, Chicago – started 9 games at right end
- Thomas Kerr – center
- **Scott Maentz**, 6'3", 206 pounds, junior, East Grand Rapids, MI – started 6 games at left end
- George Mans – tackle
- **Gary McNitt**, 5'10", 191 pounds, senior, Mesick, MI – started 4 games at right halfback
- **Bennie McRae**, 6'0", 170 pounds, junior, Newport News, VA – started 8 games at left halfback
- John Minko – guard
- Joe O'Donnell – fullback
- David Palomaki – tackle
- **Paul Poulos**, 5'11", 205 pounds, senior, Ambridge, PA – started 7 games at left guard
- J. Paul Raeder – halfback
- Dave Raimey, 5'10", 190 pounds, sophomore, Dayton, OH – started 3 games at right halfback
- **Jon Schopf**, 6'2", 228 pounds, junior, Grand Rapids, MI – started 9 games at right tackle
- **Gerald Smith**, 5'11", 190 pounds, senior, Detroit – started 9 games at center
- **John Stamos**, 6'1", 208 pounds, junior, Chicago – started 6 games at quarterback
- William R. Stine – tackle
- Jack Strobel – halfback
- **Dick Syring**, 6'0", 192 pounds, senior, Bay City, MI – started 9 games at right guard
- Bill Tunnicliff, 6'1", 210 pounds, junior, Ferndale, MI – started 1 game at fullback
- **Ken Tureaud**, 6'1", 198 pounds, junior, Detroit – started 7 games at fullback
- Rudd Van Dyne, 6'0", 198 pounds, senior, Sedalia, MO – started 1 game at fullback
- John C. Walker – center
- Grant W. Walls Jr. – tackle
- James A. Ward – halfback

=== Coaches and other staff ===
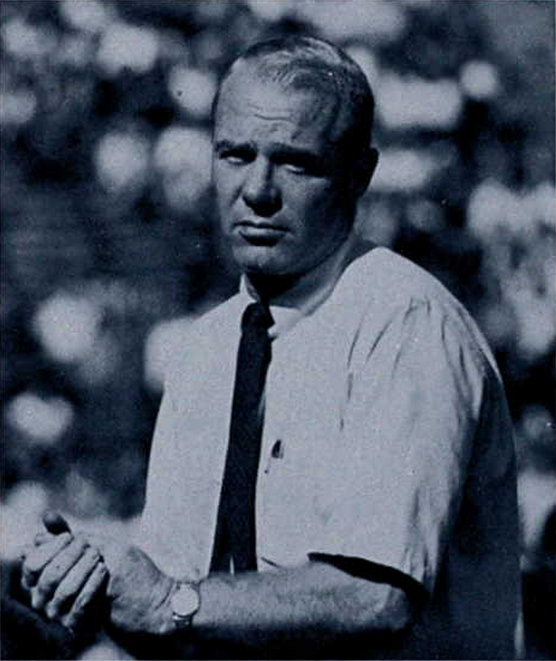
Head coach Bump Elliott

- Head coach: Bump Elliott
- Assistant coaches:

- Don Dufek – freshman coach
- Henry Fonde – backfield coach
- Jack Fouts – interior line coach
- Robert Hollway – defensive and line coach
- Jack "Jocko" Nelson -–end coach

- Trainer: Jim Hunt
- Team doctor: A. W. Coxon
- Manager: Fred Nemancheck

== Statistical leaders ==
Michigan's individual statistical leaders for the 1960 season include those listed below.

=== Rushing ===
Player	Attempts	Net yards	Yards per attempt	Touchdowns
Bennie McRae	80	342	4.3	0
Dave Raimey	62	292	4.7	6
Dennis Fitzgerald	66	263	4.0	1
Ken Tureaud	60	233	3.9	1
Jack Strobel	27	124	4.6	1
Bill Tunnicilff	36	107	3.0	2

=== Passing ===
Player	Attempts	Completions	Interceptions	Comp %	Yards	Yds/Comp	TD	Long
Dave Glinka	124	54	11	43.5	755	14.0	5	50
John Stamos	12	3	0	25.0	55	18.0	0	na

=== Receiving ===
Player	Receptions	Yards	Yds/Recp	TD	Long
Robert Johnson	15	230	15.3	1	50
George Mans	9	136	15.1	1	31
Scott Maentz	7	127	18.1	2	34

=== Scoring ===
Player	TDs	XPM	FGM	Points
Dave Raimey	6	0	0	36
Bill Tunnicliff	2	0	0	12
Dennis Fitzgerald	2	0	0	12
Scott Maentz	2	0	0	12

=== Kickoff returns ===
Player	Returns	Yards	Yds/Return	TD	Long
Bennie McRae	9	169	18.8	0	39
Dennis Fitzgerald	3	138	46.0	1	99
Dave Raimey	3	78	26.0	0	16

=== Punt returns ===
Player	Returns	Yards	Yds/Return	TD	Long
Bennie McRae	14	113	8.1	0	18
Gary McNitt	5	56	11.2	0	31
Reid Bushong	4	45	11.3	0	14
