= 1960 Minnesota Golden Gophers football team =

American college football season

1960 Minnesota Golden Gophers football

AP Poll national champion Coaches’ Poll national champion NFF national champion Big Ten co-champion

Rose Bowl, L 7–17 vs. Washington
- Conference: Big Ten Conference

Ranking
- Coaches: No. 1
- AP: No. 1
- Record: 8–2 (6–1 Big Ten)
- Head coach: Murray Warmath (7th season)
- MVP: Tom Brown
- Captain: Greg Larson
- Home stadium: Memorial Stadium

1960 Big Ten Conference football standings
	Conf.					Overall
Team	W		L		T	W		L		T
No. 1 Minnesota +	6	–	1	–	0	8	–	2	–	0
No. 3 Iowa +	5	–	1	–	0	8	–	1	–	0
No. 8 Ohio State	5	–	2	–	0	7	–	2	–	0
No. 15 Michigan State	4	–	2	–	0	6	–	2	–	1
Illinois	3	–	4	–	0	5	–	4	–	0
Michigan	3	–	4	–	0	5	–	4	–	0
Northwestern	3	–	4	–	0	5	–	4	–	0
No. 19 Purdue	3	–	4	–	0	4	–	4	–	1
Wisconsin	2	–	5	–	0	4	–	5	–	0
Indiana	0	–	7	–	0	1	–	8	–	0
+ – Conference co-champions; Rankings from AP Poll

The 1960 Minnesota Golden Gophers football team represented the University of Minnesota in the Big Ten Conference during the 1960 college football season. In their seventh year under head coach Murray Warmath, the Golden Gophers compiled an 8–2 record and outscored their opponents 228 to 88.

The Gophers were led by Sandy Stephens, the first African-American All-American starting quarterback at the school. Murray Warmath entered his seventh season as the Minnesota head football coach on the heels of three consecutive losing seasons. Expectations to start the season were not very high as the Golden Gophers were not ranked by a single news service. The Gophers opened the season with a 26–14 non-conference win at No. 12 Nebraska. They shut out both Indiana and Northwestern, then also blanked Michigan 10–0 at Michigan Stadium to win the Little Brown Jug. A win over non-conference Kansas State put Minnesota at No. 3. The next game at No. 1 Iowa was one of the most notable games in the Floyd of Rosedale rivalry. Minnesota won 27–10 and were top-ranked, but then lost to Purdue the next week. After Minnesota cruised to a 26–7 victory over Wisconsin, the Gophers were tied with Iowa in the Big Ten standings, each with a loss. The final AP poll of November 29 was one of the closest ever: Minnesota with 17½ first-place votes, Mississippi 16, and Iowa 12½. The Golden Gophers had earned their fourth AP national championship and first-ever trip to the Rose Bowl in the process.

Although No. 6 Washington upset No. 1 Minnesota 17–7 in the Rose Bowl in January, the post-season loss did not affect the Golden Gophers' national championship since the final AP and Coaches' Polls were released at the conclusion of the regular season in late November and did not consider the bowl results. This led to Minnesota being the first two-loss national champion in college football history. The major wire-service polls changed this policy in 1965 (AP) and 1974 (Coaches).

Guard Tom Brown received the team's Most Valuable Player award, was a consensus first-team All-American, won the Outland Trophy, finished second in the Heisman Trophy voting, and received the Chicago Tribune Silver Football, given to the Big Ten most valuable player. Brown, end Tom Hall, and center Greg Larson were named All-Big Ten first team. Tackle Frank Brixius was named an Academic All-American and Academic All-Big Ten.

Total attendance at five home games was 334,954, an average of 55,825 per game. The largest crowd was against Illinois.

== Schedule ==
Date	Opponent	Rank	Site	Result	Attendance	Source
September 24	at No. 12 Nebraska*		Memorial Stadium; Lincoln, NE (rivalry)	W 26–14	38,000	
October 1	Indiana	No. 18	Memorial Stadium; Minneapolis, MN	W 42–0	53,725	
October 8	Northwestern	No. 14	Memorial Stadium; Minneapolis, MN	W 7–0	57,096	
October 15	Illinois^{†}	No. 10	Memorial Stadium; Minneapolis, MN	W 21–10	63,641	
October 22	at Michigan	No. 6	Michigan Stadium; Ann Arbor, MI (Little Brown Jug)	W 10–0	69,352	
October 29	Kansas State*	No. 6	Memorial Stadium; Minneapolis, MN	W 48–7	43,568	
November 5	No. 1 Iowa	No. 3	Memorial Stadium; Minneapolis, MN (rivalry)	W 27–10	65,610	
November 12	Purdue	No. 1	Memorial Stadium; Minneapolis, MN	L 14–23	61,348	
November 19	at Wisconsin	No. 4	Camp Randall Stadium; Madison, WI (rivalry)	W 26–7	55,576	
January 2, 1961	vs. No. 6 Washington*	No. 1	Rose Bowl; Pasadena, CA (Rose Bowl)	L 7–17	97,314	
*Non-conference game; ^{†}Homecoming; Rankings from AP Poll released prior to the game; Source:

== Game summaries ==
=== Iowa ===
#1 Iowa at #3 Minnesota

Team	1	2	3	4	Total
Hawkeyes	3	0	7	0	10
• Golden Gophers	7	0	6	14	27

- Date: November 5
- Location: Memorial Stadium, Minneapolis, MN
- Game attendance: 65,610
- Sources: Box Score and Game Story

Scoring summary
1	Minn	Munsey 7-yard run (Rogers kick)	Minn 7-0
1	Iowa	Moore 28-yard field goal	Minn 7-3
3	Iowa	Williams 20-yard run (Moore kick)	Iowa 10-7
3	Minn	Stephens 1-yard run (kick failed)	Minn 13-10
3	Minn	Hagberg 42-yard run (Rogers kick)	Minn 20-10
4	Minn	Salem 1-yard run (Rogers kick)	Minn 27-10
