= 1960 Notre Dame Fighting Irish football team =

American college football season

1960 Notre Dame Fighting Irish football
- Conference: Independent
- Record: 2–8
- Head coach: Joe Kuharich (2nd season)
- Captain: Myron Pottios
- Home stadium: Notre Dame Stadium

1960 Midwestern major college football independents records
	Conf.			Overall
Team	W	L	T	W		L		T
Detroit		–		7	–	2	–	0
Xavier		–		5	–	5	–	0
Marquette		–		3	–	6	–	0
Notre Dame		–		2	–	8	–	0
Dayton		–		1	–	9	–	0

The 1960 Notre Dame Fighting Irish football team was an American football team that represented the University of Notre Dame as an independent during the 1960 college football season. In their second year under head coach Joe Kuharich, the Fighting Irish compiled a 2–8 record and were outscored by a total of 188 to 111.

The Irish were ranked No. 12 after defeating California in the season opener, but then lost eight consecutive games, including matches with No. 14 Michigan State, No. 4 Navy, No. 14 Pittsburgh, and No. 2 Iowa. They concluded the season with a 17–0 victory in their annual rivalry game with USC.

On offense, the Irish tallied an average of 90.0 passing yards and 153.7 rushing yards per game. On defense, they gave up an average of 91.9 passing yards and 160.8 rushing yards per game. The team's individual statistical leaders included quarterback George Haffner (548 passing yards), Angelo Dabiero (325 rushing yards), Les Traver (14 receptions for 225 yards), and Bob Scarpitto (30 points scored). Guard Myron Pottios was selected by Time magazine as a first-team All-American.

The team played its home games at Notre Dame Stadium in Notre Dame, Indiana.

== Schedule ==
Date	Opponent	Rank	Site	TV	Result	Attendance	Source
September 24	California		Notre Dame Stadium; Notre Dame, IN		W 21–7	49,286	
October 1	Purdue	No. 12	Notre Dame Stadium; Notre Dame, IN (rivalry)		L 19–51	59,235	
October 8	at North Carolina		Kenan Memorial Stadium; Chapel Hill, NC (rivalry)		L 7–12	41,000	
October 15	No. 14 Michigan State		Notre Dame Stadium; Notre Dame, IN (rivalry)		L 0–21	59,133	
October 22	at Northwestern		Dyche Stadium; Evanston, IL (rivalry)	ABC	L 6–7	55,682	
October 29	vs. No. 4 Navy		Philadelphia Municipal Stadium; Philadelphia, PA (rivalry)		L 7–14	63,000	
November 5	No. 14 Pittsburgh		Notre Dame Stadium; Notre Dame, IN (rivalry)		L 13–20	55,696	
November 12	at Miami (FL)		Miami Orange Bowl; Miami, FL (rivalry)		L 21–28	58,062	
November 19	No. 2 Iowa		Notre Dame Stadium; Notre Dame, IN		L 0–28	54,146	
November 26	at USC		Los Angeles Memorial Coliseum; Los Angeles, CA (rivalry)		W 17–0	28,297	
Rankings from AP Poll released prior to the game; Source:

== Personnel ==
=== Roster ===
- QB: George Haffner, Daryle Lamonica, Dan Luecke, Norb Rascher
- HB: Leo Caito, Bill Clark, Angelo Dabiero, Tom Liggio, Red Mack, Frank Minik, Charlie O'Hara, Ray Ratkowski, Ed Rutkowski, Bob Scarpitto, George Sefcik
- FB: Bill Ahern, Frank Gargiulo, Bill Henneghan, Mike Lind, Joe Maxwell, Dick Naab, Joe Perkowski
- E: Brian Boulac, Max Burnell, Jack Cullen, Bill Ford, Steve Kolski, Jim Mikacich, Tom Monohan, Denny Murphy, John Powers, Leo Seiler, Jim Sherlock, Les Traver
- C: Bill Clements, Tom Hecomovich, Ed Hoerster, John Linehan, Gene Viola
- OG: Charlie Augustine, Nick Buoniconti, Nick DePola, Frank Grau, Jim Loula, Mike Magnotta, Paul Nissi, Myron Pottios, Norb Roy
- OT: Bob Bill, Ed Burke, Joe Carollo, Dan Kolasinski, Bob Koreck, Bob Pietrzak, Roger Wilke, George Williams
- DB: Jack Castin, Clay Schulz

=== Coaching staff ===
- Head coach: Joe Kuharich
- Assistant coaches: Bill Daddio (first assistant, ends), Hugh Devore (freshman), Don Doll (backfield), Brad Lynn (assistant backfield), John Murphy (assistant freshman), Dick Stanfel (line)

== 1961 NFL draft ==
Player	Position	Round	NFL club
Myron Pottios	Linebacker	2	Pittsburgh Steelers
Red Mack	Tight End	10	Pittsburgh Steelers
Ray Ratkowski	Running Back	20	Green Bay Packers
