= 1960 Northwestern Wildcats football team =

American college football season

1960 Northwestern Wildcats football
- Conference: Big Ten Conference
- Record: 5–4 (3–4 Big Ten)
- Head coach: Ara Parseghian (5th season)
- MVP: Mike Stock
- Captains: Irv Cross; Mike Stock
- Home stadium: Dyche Stadium

1960 Big Ten Conference football standings
	Conf.					Overall
Team	W		L		T	W		L		T
No. 1 Minnesota +	6	–	1	–	0	8	–	2	–	0
No. 3 Iowa +	5	–	1	–	0	8	–	1	–	0
No. 8 Ohio State	5	–	2	–	0	7	–	2	–	0
No. 15 Michigan State	4	–	2	–	0	6	–	2	–	1
Illinois	3	–	4	–	0	5	–	4	–	0
Michigan	3	–	4	–	0	5	–	4	–	0
Northwestern	3	–	4	–	0	5	–	4	–	0
No. 19 Purdue	3	–	4	–	0	4	–	4	–	1
Wisconsin	2	–	5	–	0	4	–	5	–	0
Indiana	0	–	7	–	0	1	–	8	–	0
+ – Conference co-champions; Rankings from AP Poll

The 1960 Northwestern Wildcats team represented Northwestern University during the 1960 Big Ten Conference football season. In their sixth year under head coach Ara Parseghian, the Wildcats compiled a 5–4 record (3–4 against Big Ten Conference opponents) and finished in a four-way tie for fifth place in the Big Ten Conference.

The team's offensive leaders were Dick Thornton with 901 passing yards, Mike Stock with 536 rushing yards, and Elbert Kimbrough with 378 receiving yards.

== Schedule ==
Date	Opponent	Rank	Site	Result	Attendance	Source
September 24	at Oklahoma*	No. 14	Oklahoma Memorial Stadium; Norman, OK	W 19–3	61,500	
October 1	No. 8 Iowa	No. 6	Dyche Stadium; Evanston, IL	L 0–42	48,109	
October 8	at No. 14 Minnesota		Memorial Stadium; Minneapolis, MN	L 0–7	57,096	
October 15	at Michigan		Michigan Stadium; Ann Arbor, MI (rivalry)	L 7–14	63,027	
October 22	Notre Dame*		Dyche Stadium; Evanston, IL (rivalry)	W 7–6	55,682	
October 29	at Indiana		Seventeenth Street Stadium; Bloomington, IN	W 21–3	19,092	
November 5	at Wisconsin		Camp Randall Stadium; Madison, WI	W 21–0	61,730	
November 12	No. 13 Michigan State		Dyche Stadium; Evanston, IL	L 18–21	47,022	
November 19	Illinois		Dyche Stadium; Evanston, IL (rivalry)	W 14–7	51,782	
*Non-conference game; Rankings from AP Poll released prior to the game; Source:
