= 1960 Indiana Hoosiers football team =

American college football season

1960 Indiana Hoosiers football
- Conference: Big Ten Conference
- Record: 1–8 (0–7 Big Ten)
- Head coach: Phil Dickens (3rd season)
- MVP: Earl Faison
- Captain: Richie Bradford
- Home stadium: Seventeenth Street Stadium

1960 Big Ten Conference football standings
	Conf.					Overall
Team	W		L		T	W		L		T
No. 1 Minnesota +	6	–	1	–	0	8	–	2	–	0
No. 3 Iowa +	5	–	1	–	0	8	–	1	–	0
No. 8 Ohio State	5	–	2	–	0	7	–	2	–	0
No. 15 Michigan State	4	–	2	–	0	6	–	2	–	1
Illinois	3	–	4	–	0	5	–	4	–	0
Michigan	3	–	4	–	0	5	–	4	–	0
Northwestern	3	–	4	–	0	5	–	4	–	0
No. 19 Purdue	3	–	4	–	0	4	–	4	–	1
Wisconsin	2	–	5	–	0	4	–	5	–	0
Indiana	0	–	7	–	0	1	–	8	–	0
+ – Conference co-champions; Rankings from AP Poll

The 1960 Indiana Hoosiers football team represented the Indiana Hoosiers in the 1960 Big Ten Conference football season. They participated as members of the Big Ten Conference. The Hoosiers played their home games at Seventeenth Street Stadium in Bloomington, Indiana. The team was coached by Phil Dickens, in his third year as head coach of the Hoosiers.

== Schedule ==
Date	Opponent	Site	Result	Attendance	Source
September 24	at No. 4 Illinois	Memorial Stadium; Champaign, IL (rivalry)	L 6–17	38,444	
October 1	at No. 18 Minnesota	Memorial Stadium; Minneapolis, MN	L 0–42	53,725	
October 8	Oregon State*	Seventeenth Street Stadium; Bloomington, IN	L 6–20	25,000	
October 15	Marquette*	Seventeenth Street Stadium; Bloomington, IN	W 34–8	26,123	
October 22	No. 13 Michigan State^{†}	Seventeenth Street Stadium; Bloomington, IN (rivalry)	L 0–35	32,322	
October 29	Northwestern	Seventeenth Street Stadium; Bloomington, IN	L 3–21	19,092	
November 5	at No. 5 Ohio State	Ohio Stadium; Columbus, OH	L 7–36	81,530	
November 12	at Michigan	Michigan Stadium; Ann Arbor, MI	L 7–29	51,936	
November 19	at No. 13 Purdue	Ross–Ade Stadium; West Lafayette, IN (Old Oaken Bucket)	L 6–35	45,723	
*Non-conference game; ^{†}Homecoming; Rankings from AP Poll released prior to the game; Source:

== 1961 NFL draftees ==
Player	Position	Round	Pick	NFL club
Earl Faison	End	5	66	Detroit Lions
Moses Gray	Tackle	9	123	New York Giants
Wilbert Scott	Back	16	215	Pittsburgh Steelers
Randy Williams	Back	18	240	Dallas Cowboys
Ed Morris	Tackle	18	251	Cleveland Browns
