= Dennis Fitzgerald =

American freestyle wrestler, football player and coach

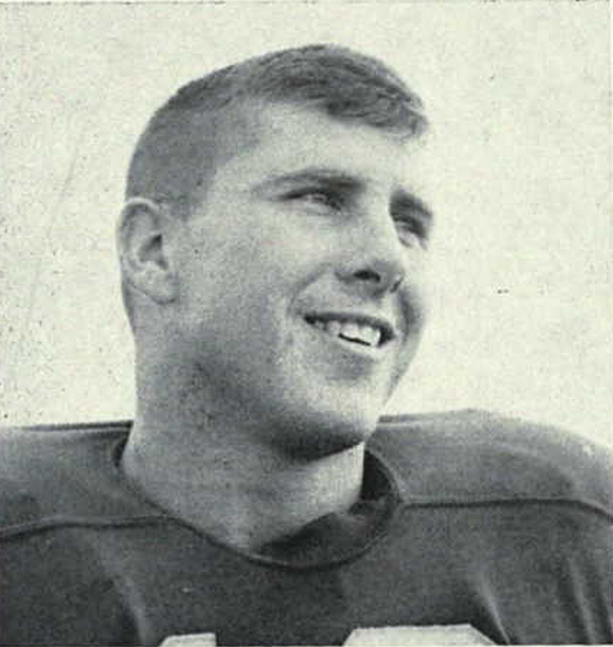
- Dennis Fitzgerald, 1960

Biographical details
- Born: March 13, 1936; Ann Arbor, Michigan, U.S.
- Died: January 14, 2001 (aged 64); Allison Park, Pennsylvania, U.S.

Playing career
- 1959–1960: Michigan
- Position: Halfback

Coaching career (HC unless noted)
- 1963–1968: Michigan (assistant)
- 1969–1970: Kentucky (DC)
- 1971–1974: Kent State (DC)
- 1975–1977: Kent State
- 1978–1980: Syracuse (DC)
- 1981: Tulane (DC)
- 1982–1986: Pittsburgh Steelers (LB)
- 1987–1988: Pittsburgh Steelers (ST)
- 1992: Las Vegas Aces (DC)
- 1994–1996: Grand Valley State (assistant)
- 1995–1996: Albany Firebirds (DC)
- 1997: James Madison (assistant)
- 1998–1999: Albany Firebirds (DC)

Head coaching record
- Overall: 18–16

Joseph Dennis Fitzgerald (March 13, 1936 – January 14, 2001) was an American freestyle wrestler and football player and coach. Fitzgerald played college football as a halfback at the University of Michigan and was selected as named the most valuable player on the 1960 Michigan Wolverines football team. He holds the University of Michigan record for the longest kickoff return at 99 yards. Fitzgerald also competed as a wrestler, winning Big Ten Conference championships in 1960 and 1961 and winning a gold medal representing the United States as the 1963 Pan American Games in São Paulo.

Fitzgerald spent more than 35 years working as a football coach for several university and professional football teams. He held assistant coaching positions at, among others, the University of Michigan, University of Kentucky, Syracuse University, Tulane University and Grand Valley State University. He was the head football coach at Kent State University from 1975 to 1977 and spent seven years (1982–1988) as an assistant coach for the Pittsburgh Steelers under head coach Chuck Noll. His final coaching position was as the defensive coordinator for the Albany Firebirds of the Arena Football League.

== Early years ==
A native of Ann Arbor, Michigan, Fitzgerald graduated from St. Thomas High School in 1954. He served in the United States Marine Corps from 1954 to 1957. He was a member of the Camp LeJeune wrestling team in 1956 and 1957.

== University of Michigan ==
=== Football ===
After being discharged from the Marines, Fitzgerald enrolled at the University of Michigan where he walked on as a 5-foot, 9 inch halfback. He was a starting halfback for Michigan in 1959 and 1960. In October 1960, Fitzgerald had a 99-yard kickoff return against Michigan State. He set the record for the longest kickoff return in University of Michigan history, though Tyrone Wheatley tied the record in September 1992 against Houston. Fitzgerald was among the last American football players to play the game wearing a leather helmet with no face guard. He also ran five miles a day to warm up and developed a reputation as "Michigan's hardest working football player." In October 1960, he came down with a sudden illness that reduced his efficiency in Michigan's 1960 victory over Duke. He caught a touchdown pass in the game but reported that he was not feeling well. The team doctor, Dr. A.W. Coxon, told head coach Bump Elliott, "Denny is just plain tired, and that may have made him more susceptible to the virus.'" Elliott noted at the time, "I can understand it. He never gives anything less than all he's got. It's hard to keep up a pace like that and not suffer." Fitzgerald was named the most valuable player on the 1960 Michigan Wolverines football team. He was a member of the Michigan Wolverines football and wrestling teams.

=== Wrestling ===
Fitzgerald was also a member of the Michigan Wolverines wrestling team from 1959 to 1961. In 1960 and 1961, he was also the Big Ten wrestling champion at 177 pounds. He was also the runner up in the 1959 Big Ten championship at 167 pounds, an NCAA semifinalist in 1960 and 1961, an AAU national finalist in 1961, and the AAU runner up in 1963. He was captain of Michigan's wrestling team during his junior and senior years. He continued to participate in amateur wrestling even after receiving his degree at Michigan. He won a gold medal representing the United States as the 1963 Pan American Games in São Paulo, and also participated in the 1963 World Games in Bulgaria.

Fitzgerald received his master's degree from the University of Michigan in 1963.

== Coaching career ==
Fitzgerald was an assistant football coach at Michigan (1963–1968), the University of Kentucky (1969–1970), and Kent State University (1971–1974). In January 1975, Fitzgerald replaced Don James as Kent State's head football coach. In three years as head coach, Fitzgerald compiled a record of 18–16. Nick Saban began his coaching career as an assistant coach on Fitzgerald's Kent State staff.

In March 1978, Fitzgerald resigned his position at Kent State to become an assistant coach at Syracuse University. Fitzgerald remained with Syracuse as linebackers coach and defensive coordinator for three years from 1978 to 1980.

In March 1981, Fitzgerald was hired as the defensive coordinator for Tulane University.

In July 1982, Fitzgerald was hired by the Pittsburgh Steelers following an interview with head coach Chuck Noll. The Pittsburgh Press described the hiring as follows:

"Noll interviewed Dennis Fitzgerald, a 46-year-old coach from Tulane with 21 years of experience in the college ranks, at 9 a.m., hired him on the spot, and put him immediately to work. He's to coach the linebackers, one of whom, All-Pro Jack Lambert when Fitzgerald was an assistant at Kent State."

Fitzgerald spent nine years as an assistant coach under Noll, serving as the linebackers coach from 1982 to 1986 and special tams coach from 1987 to 1988. He came within one game of the Super Bowl in 1984, when the Steelers lost to the Miami Dolphins in the AFC Championship Game. After the Steelers gave up six blocked punts in the 1988 NFL season, Fitzgerald was fired from the Steelers' coaching staff in January 1989.

When Jack Lambert was inducted into the Pro Football Hall of Fame in 1990, he asked Fitzgerald to present him at the induction ceremony. Lambert said, "I chose coach Fitzgerald because I felt he, more than anyone else, taught me the techniques and the fundamentals that I used throughout college and professional football. But even more importantly, he took a raw talent and raw toughness in me and refined them into a mental discipline; a discipline that is necessary to excel."

After leaving the Steelers, Fitzgerald was the defensive coordinator and linebackers coach for the Las Vegas Aces in the Professional Spring Football League (PSFL) starting in 1992, and the Cleveland Thunderbolts in the Arena Football League.

In 1994, Fitzgerald served as the defensive line coach at Grand Valley State University. He continued to coach at Grand Valley through the 1996 season.

Fitzgerald was the defensive coordinator for the Albany Firebirds of the Arena Football League from 1995 to 1996 and 1998 to 1999. During the 1995 and 1996 seasons, Fitzgerald continued to coach at Grand Valley in the fall while coaching with the Firebirds during the spring and summer.

In between stints with the Firebirds, Fitzgerald spent the 1997 season as defensive coordinator for the James Madison Dukes. Shortly after he was hired at James Madison, the Richmond Times-Dispatch wrote, "So last winter, when James Madison coach Alex Wood sought a zero-tolerance coordinator who could firm up a defense that turned flaccid over the past two seasons, he called Fitzgerald, who's 61 going on 35."

== Death and family ==
He was diagnosed with lymphoma before the 1999 season, but remained with the team as he underwent chemotherapy treatments. The Firebirds won the Arena Bowl in 1999, Fitzgerald's last year as a coach. His wife later said, "It was his last year of coaching, and he underwent radiation treatment and never missed a day of practice. When he retired in 1999, he already had lymphoma for eight months."

Due to his illness, Fitzgerald was forced to retire before the 2000 season. He died on January 14, 2001, at his home in Allison Park, Pennsylvania. He was survived by his wife, Elizabeth, five daughters (Maureen, Molly, Margaret, Katharine and Eileen), and a son, Timothy .

== Head coaching record ==
Year	Team	Overall	Conference	Standing	Bowl/playoffs
Kent State Golden Flashes (Mid-American Conference) (1975–1977)
1976	Kent State	4–7	1–6	8th	
1976	Kent State	8–4	6–2	T–2nd	
1977	Kent State	6–5	5–4	6th	
Kent State:		18–16	12–12		
Total:		18–16			
