= Dave Glinka =

American football player (born 1941)

David Glinka
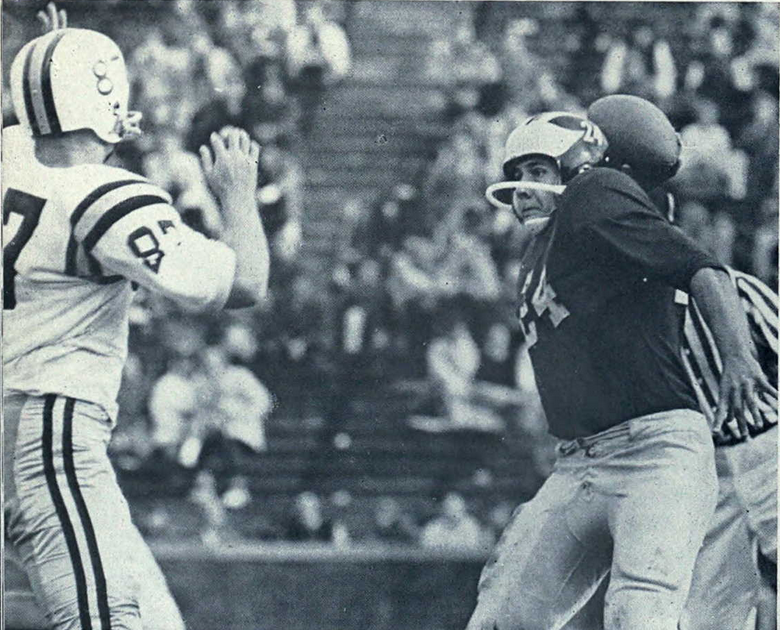
- Glinka in 1960 Michigan-Minnesota game

Michigan Wolverines
- Position: Quarterback

Personal information
- Born: January 22, 1941 (age 85); Toledo, Ohio, U.S.
- Listed height: 6 ft 1 in (1.85 m)
- Listed weight: 198 lb (90 kg)

Career information
- High school: Catholic Central High School, Toledo, Ohio
- College: Michigan

Career history
- 1960–1962: Michigan

David J. Glinka (born January 22, 1941) is a retired American football player. He played at the quarterback position for the University of Michigan from 1960 to 1962.

== Early life ==
A native of Toledo, Ohio, Glinka attended Toledo Catholic Central High School, winning all-city and all-state honors in football.

== University of Michigan ==
In 1959, Glinka enrolled at the University of Michigan. He played quarterback for the Michigan Wolverines football team from 1960 to 1962 and completed 107 of 237 passes for 1,394 yards, 10 touchdowns and 17 interceptions.

=== 1960 season ===
As a sophomore, Glinka played in all nine games at quarterback, three as a starter, for the 1960 Michigan Wolverines football team. He was the first sophomore to start as Michigan's quarterback since Forest Evashevski in 1938. He made his debut as Michigan's starting quarterback in the season opener against Oregon. Glinka completed 5 of 11 passes against Oregon and threw two touchdown passes (to George Mans and Scott Maentz) to lead the Wolverines to a 21–0 victory. Against Michigan State in the second game of the 1960 season, Glinka completed 6 of 19 passes for 96 yards. In the third game of the 1960 season, Glinka led the Wolverines to a 31–6 win over Duke. Glinka completed 8 of 14 passes for 111 yards. On the first drive of the second half against Duke, Glinka led the Wolverines to a touchdown with passes of 34 yards to Scott Maentz, 11 yards to Bob Johnson and 5 yards to Dennis Fitzgerald. In week four, Glinka led Michigan to a 14–7 win over Northwestern, throwing a 50-yard touchdown pass to Bob Johnson; Johnson caught three of Glinka's passes in the game for 97 yards. In the fifth game of the season, Glinka was intercepted twice in 10–0 loss to Minnesota. In the sixth game, Glinka completed 7 of 18 passes in a loss to Wisconsin. During the 1960 season, Glinka completed 54 of 124 passes for 755 yards and five interceptions. However, he also threw 11 interceptions in nine games.

=== 1961 season ===
As a junior in 1961, Glinka again appeared in all nine games for the Wolverines. Glinka had his best game in a 16–14 victory over Purdue in October 1961. Glinka completed 9 of 11 passes for 170 yards, including a game-winning 72-yard touchdown pass to Bennie McRae in the third quarter. After the game, Michigan head coach Bump Elliott said, "He really came through out there. It was his best day." Three weeks later, Glinka had another strong showing in 28–14 win over Duke. Glinka was four-for-eight passing and threw two touchdown passes, including a 45-yard touchdown pass to Robert Brown. And on November 18, he ran 44 yards for a touchdown in a comeback victory over Iowa. During the 1961 season, Glinka completed 46 of 96 passes for 588 yards, five touchdowns and five interceptions.

=== 1962 season ===
As a senior in 1962, Glinka began the season as Michigan's No. 1 quarterback. An Associated Press story in the spring of 1962 touted the strength of Michigan's quarterbacking corps and said of Glinka: "No. 1 quarterback, of course, is the ever-improving Toledo senior Dave Glinka. He's in solid with his bosses after two seasons as the leading signal caller. Michigan has been 5-4 and 6-3 in those seasons." After being switched to defense, Glinka was injured in the fourth game of the season against Purdue, underwent knee surgery on October 23, 1962, and missed the remainder of the 1962 season.
