= 1960 Wisconsin Badgers football team =

American college football season

1960 Wisconsin Badgers football
- Conference: Big Ten Conference
- Record: 4–5 (2–5 Big Ten)
- Head coach: Milt Bruhn (5th season)
- MVP: Tom Wiesner
- Captains: Henry Derleth; Tom Wiesner
- Home stadium: Camp Randall Stadium

1960 Big Ten Conference football standings
	Conf.					Overall
Team	W		L		T	W		L		T
No. 1 Minnesota +	6	–	1	–	0	8	–	2	–	0
No. 3 Iowa +	5	–	1	–	0	8	–	1	–	0
No. 8 Ohio State	5	–	2	–	0	7	–	2	–	0
No. 15 Michigan State	4	–	2	–	0	6	–	2	–	1
Illinois	3	–	4	–	0	5	–	4	–	0
Michigan	3	–	4	–	0	5	–	4	–	0
Northwestern	3	–	4	–	0	5	–	4	–	0
No. 19 Purdue	3	–	4	–	0	4	–	4	–	1
Wisconsin	2	–	5	–	0	4	–	5	–	0
Indiana	0	–	7	–	0	1	–	8	–	0
+ – Conference co-champions; Rankings from AP Poll

The 1960 Wisconsin Badgers football team represented the University of Wisconsin in the 1960 Big Ten Conference football season. Led by fifth-year head coach Milt Bruhn, the Badgers compiled an overall record of 4–5 with a mark of 2–5 in conference play, placing ninth in the Big Ten.

== Schedule ==
Date	Opponent	Rank	Site	Result	Attendance	Source
September 24	at Stanford*		Stanford Stadium; Stanford, CA	W 24–7	29,500	
October 1	Marquette*		Camp Randall Stadium; Madison, WI	W 35–6	51,553	
October 8	No. 7 Purdue		Camp Randall Stadium; Madison, WI	W 24–13	58,292	
October 15	at No. 2 Iowa	No. 12	Iowa Stadium; Iowa City, IA (rivalry)	L 21–28	57,000	
October 22	at No. 9 Ohio State	No. 11	Ohio Stadium; Columbus, OH	L 7–34	83,246	
October 29	Michigan		Camp Randall Stadium; Madison, WI	W 16–13	57,629	
November 5	Northwestern^{†}		Camp Randall Stadium; Madison, WI	L 0–21	61,730	
November 12	at Illinois		Memorial Stadium; Champaign, IL	L 14–35	48,163	
November 19	No. 4 Minnesota		Camp Randall Stadium; Madison, WI (rivalry)	L 7–26	55,576	
*Non-conference game; ^{†}Homecoming; Rankings from AP Poll released prior to the game; Source:

== Roster ==
- DB Ron Vander Kelen

== 1961 NFL draft ==
Player	Position	Round	Pick	NFL club
Ron Miller	Quarterback	3	41	Los Angeles Rams
Tom Wiesner	Back	16	217	Baltimore Colts

== 1961 American Football League draft ==
Player	Position	Round	AFL club
Ron Miller	Quarterback	21	Houston Oilers
Terry Huxhold	Tackle	27	Boston Patriots
