= 1960 major college football rankings =

- Season: 1960
- Bowl season: 1960–61 bowl games
- Preseason No. 1: Syracuse
- End of season champions: Minnesota

Two human polls comprised the 1960 major college football rankings. Unlike most sports, college football's governing body, the NCAA, does not bestow a national championship, instead that title is bestowed by one or more different polling agencies. There are two main weekly polls that begin in the preseason—the AP Poll and the Coaches Poll.

== Legend ==
	Increase in ranking
	Decrease in ranking
	Not ranked previous week
	National champion
(#–#)	Win–loss record
(Italics)	Number of first place votes
т	Tied with team above or below also with this symbol

== AP poll ==
The final AP poll was released on November 29, at the end of the regular season, over a month before the major bowls.

	Preseason Aug	Week 1 Sep 19	Week 2 Sep 26	Week 3 Oct 3	Week 4 Oct 10	Week 5 Oct 17	Week 6 Oct 24	Week 7 Oct 31	Week 8 Nov 7	Week 9 Nov 14	Week 10 Nov 21	Week 11 (Final) Nov 28	
1.	Syracuse (26)	Ole Miss (1–0) (22)	Ole Miss (2–0) (42)	Syracuse (2–0) (28)	Ole Miss (4–0) (19)	Iowa (4–0) (23)	Iowa (5–0) (34)	Iowa (6–0) (46)	Minnesota (7–0) (40)	Missouri (9–0) (34)	Minnesota (8–1) (13.5)	Minnesota (8–1) (17 1/2)	1.
2.	Ole Miss (21)	Syracuse (0–0) (22)	Syracuse (1–0)	Ole Miss (3–0) (14)	Iowa (3–0) (17)	Ole Miss (5–0) (22)	Ole Miss (6–0) (9)	Missouri (7–0)	Missouri (8–0) (4)	Iowa (7–1) (7)	Iowa (8–1) (17.5)	Ole Miss (9–0–1) (16)	2.
3.	Washington (1)	Washington (1–0) (3)	Washington (2–0) (5)	Iowa (2–0) (5)	Ohio State (3–0) (8)	Syracuse (4–0) (2)	Syracuse (5–0) (5)	Minnesota (6–0) (1)	Ohio State (6–1) (1)	Ole Miss (8–0–1) (5)	Ole Miss (8–0–1) (13)	Iowa (8–1) (12 1/2)	3.
4.	Texas	Illinois (0–0)	Illinois (1–0)	Illinois (2–0)	Syracuse (3–0) (4)	Navy (5–0)	Navy (6–0)	Navy (7–0)	Ole Miss (7–0–1) (1)	Minnesota (7–1) (1)	Washington (9–1) (2)	Navy (8–1)	4.
5.	Illinois	Alabama (1–0)	Kansas (2–0)	Ohio State (2–0)	Navy (4–0)	Missouri (5–0)	Missouri (6–0)	Ohio State (5–1)	Iowa (6–1)	Washington (8–1)	Missouri (9–1)	Missouri (9–1)	5.
6.	USC	Michigan State (0–0)	Northwestern (1–0) (1)	Navy (3–0)	Missouri (4–0)	Minnesota (4–0)	Minnesota (5–0)	Ole Miss (6–0–1)	Washington (7–1) (1)	Duke (7–1)	Arkansas (8–2)	Washington (9–1) (2)	6.
7.	Pittsburgh	Kansas (1–0)	Clemson (1–0)	Purdue (1–0–1)	Baylor (3–0)	Baylor (4–0)	Baylor (5–0)	Washington (6–1) (1)	Duke (6–1)	Arkansas (7–2)	Navy (8–1)	Arkansas (8–2)	7.
8.	Michigan State	UCLA (1–0)	Iowa (1–0)	Clemson (2–0)	Clemson (3–0)	Washington (4–1) (1)	Ohio State (4–1)	Tennessee (5–0–1)	Navy (7–1)	Navy (8–1)	Auburn (8–1) (1)	Ohio State (7–2)	8.
9.	Clemson	Clemson (0–0)	Ohio State (1–0)	Arkansas (3–0)	Kansas (3–1)	Ohio State (3–1)	Washington (5–1)	Syracuse (5–1)	Arkansas (6–2)	Auburn (7–1) (1)	Ohio State (7–2)	Alabama (8–1–1)	9.
10.	Oklahoma	Oregon State (1–0)	Georgia Tech (2–0)	Kansas (2–1)	Minnesota (3–0)	Purdue (2–1–1)	Michigan State (3–1–1)	Rice (5–1)	Auburn (6–1)	Ohio State (6–2)	Kansas (7–2–1)	Duke (7–2)	10.
11.	TCU	Penn State (1–0)	Tennessee (1–0)	Missouri (3–0)	Texas (3–1)	Wisconsin (3–1)	Tennessee (4–0–1)	Baylor (5–1)	UCLA (4–1–1)	UCLA (5–1–1)	Duke (7–2)	Kansas (7–2–1)	11.
12.	Auburn	Nebraska (1–0)	Notre Dame (1–0)	Washington (2–1)	Wisconsin (3–0)	Tennessee (3–0–1)	Arkansas (4–2)	Auburn (5–1)	Pittsburgh (4–2–2)	Michigan State (5–2–1)	Rice (7–2)	Baylor (8–2)	12.
13.	Georgia	Georgia Tech (1–0)	Texas (1–1)	Michigan State (1–0–1)	Washington (3–1)	Michigan State (2–1–1)	Rice (4–1)	Duke (5–1)	Michigan State (4–2–1)	Purdue (3–4–1)	Yale (9–0) (1)	Auburn (8–2)	13.
14.	Northwestern	Northwestern (0–0)	Arkansas (2–0)	Minnesota (2–0)	Michigan State (1–1–1)	Arkansas (4–1)	Auburn (4–1)	Pittsburgh (3–2–2)	Tennessee (5–1–1)	New Mexico State (8–0) т	Michigan State (6–2–1)	Yale (9–0)	14.
15.	Iowa	Texas (0–1)	Alabama (1–0–1)	Texas (2–1)	Alabama (2–0–1) т	Kansas (3–1–1)	Duke (4–1) т	UCLA (3–1–1)	New Mexico State (7–0)	Rice (6–2) т	New Mexico State (9–0) т	Michigan State (6–2–1)	15.
16.	Ohio State	Missouri (1–0)	UCLA (1–0–1)	UCLA (1–0–1) (1)	UCLA (1–0–1) т	Texas (3–2)	Oregon State (4–2) т	Arkansas (5–2)	Rice (5–2)	Syracuse (6–2) т	Penn State (6–3) т	Penn State (6–3)	16.
17.	Notre Dame	Pittsburgh (0–1) (1)	Navy (2–0)	Alabama (2–0–1)	Oregon State (3–1)	Auburn (3–1)	Purdue (2–2–1) т	Michigan State (3–2–1)	Syracuse (5–2) т	Yale (8–0) т	Alabama (7–1–1) т	New Mexico State (10–0)	17.
18.	Tennessee	LSU (1–0)	Minnesota (1–0)	Army (3–0) т	Arizona State (4–0)	Oregon State (4–1)	New Mexico State (6–0)	Colorado (5–1) т	Yale (7–0) т	Alabama (6–1–1)	Syracuse (7–2) т	Florida (8–2)	18.
19.	Arkansas т	Iowa (0–0)	Missouri (2–0)	Florida (3–0) т	Georgia Tech (3–1)	UCLA (1–1–1)	Kansas (4–1–1)	Utah State (7–0) т	Utah State (8–0)	Florida (7–2) т	Baylor (7–2) т	Purdue (4–4–1) т	19.
20.	Penn State т	Ohio State (0–0)	Penn State (1–0)	Baylor (2–0)	Penn State (2–1)	Rice (3–1)		New Mexico State (7–0)	Florida (6–2)	Oregon (7–2) т	Florida (7–2) т	Syracuse (7–2) т	20.
	Preseason Aug	Week 1 Sep 19	Week 2 Sep 26	Week 3 Oct 3	Week 4 Oct 10	Week 5 Oct 17	Week 6 Oct 24	Week 7 Oct 31	Week 8 Nov 7	Week 9 Nov 14	Week 10 Nov 21	Week 11 (Final) Nov 28	
		Dropped: Arkansas; Auburn; Georgia; Notre Dame; Oklahoma; TCU; Tennessee; USC	Dropped: LSU; Michigan State; Nebraska; Oregon State; Pittsburgh	Dropped: Georgia Tech; Northwestern; Notre Dame; Penn State; Tennessee	Dropped: Arkansas; Army; Florida; Illinois; Purdue	Dropped: Alabama; Arizona State; Clemson; Georgia Tech; Penn State	Dropped: Texas; UCLA; Wisconsin	Dropped: Kansas; Oregon State; Purdue	Dropped: Baylor; Colorado	Dropped: Pittsburgh; Tennessee; Utah State	Dropped: Oregon; Purdue; UCLA	Dropped: Rice	

A.Only 19 teams received votes in week 6.

== UPI Coaches Poll ==
The final United Press International (UPI) Coaches Poll was released prior to the bowl games, on November 29.
Minnesota received 21 of the 35 first-place votes; Mississippi received nine and Iowa five.

Ranking	Team	Conference	Bowl
1	Minnesota	Big Ten	Lost Rose, 7–17
2	Iowa	Big Ten	none
3	Ole Miss	SEC	Won Sugar, 14–6
4	Missouri	Big Eight	Won Orange, 21–14
5	Washington	AAWU	Won Rose, 17–7
6	Navy	Independent	Lost Orange, 14–21
7	Arkansas	Southwest	Lost Cotton, 6–7
8	Ohio State	Big Ten	none
9	Kansas	Big Eight	none
9	Alabama	SEC	Tied Bluebonnet, 3–3
11	Baylor	Southwest	Lost Gator, 12–13
12	Duke	ACC	Won Cotton, 7–6
13	Michigan State	Big Ten	none
14	Auburn	SEC	none
15	Purdue	Big Ten	none
16	Florida	SEC	Won Gator, 13–12
17	Texas	Southwest	Tied Bluebonnet, 3–3
18	Yale	Ivy	none
18	New Mexico State	Border	Won Sun, 20–13
18	Tennessee	SEC	none

- Prior to the 1975 season, the Big Ten and AAWU (later Pac-8) conferences allowed only one postseason participant each, for the Rose Bowl.
- The Ivy League has prohibited its members from participating in postseason football since the league was officially formed in 1954.

== FWAA poll ==
The Football Writers Association of America awarded the Grantland Rice Award to Mississippi based on the post-bowl voting of a 6-member committee.

	Final January 6	
1.	Ole Miss 13 (3)	1.
2.	Iowa 10 (2)	2.
3.	Washington 6	3.
4.	Missouri 4	4.
5.	Minnesota 3 (1)	5.
	Final January 6	

== Litkenhous Ratings ==
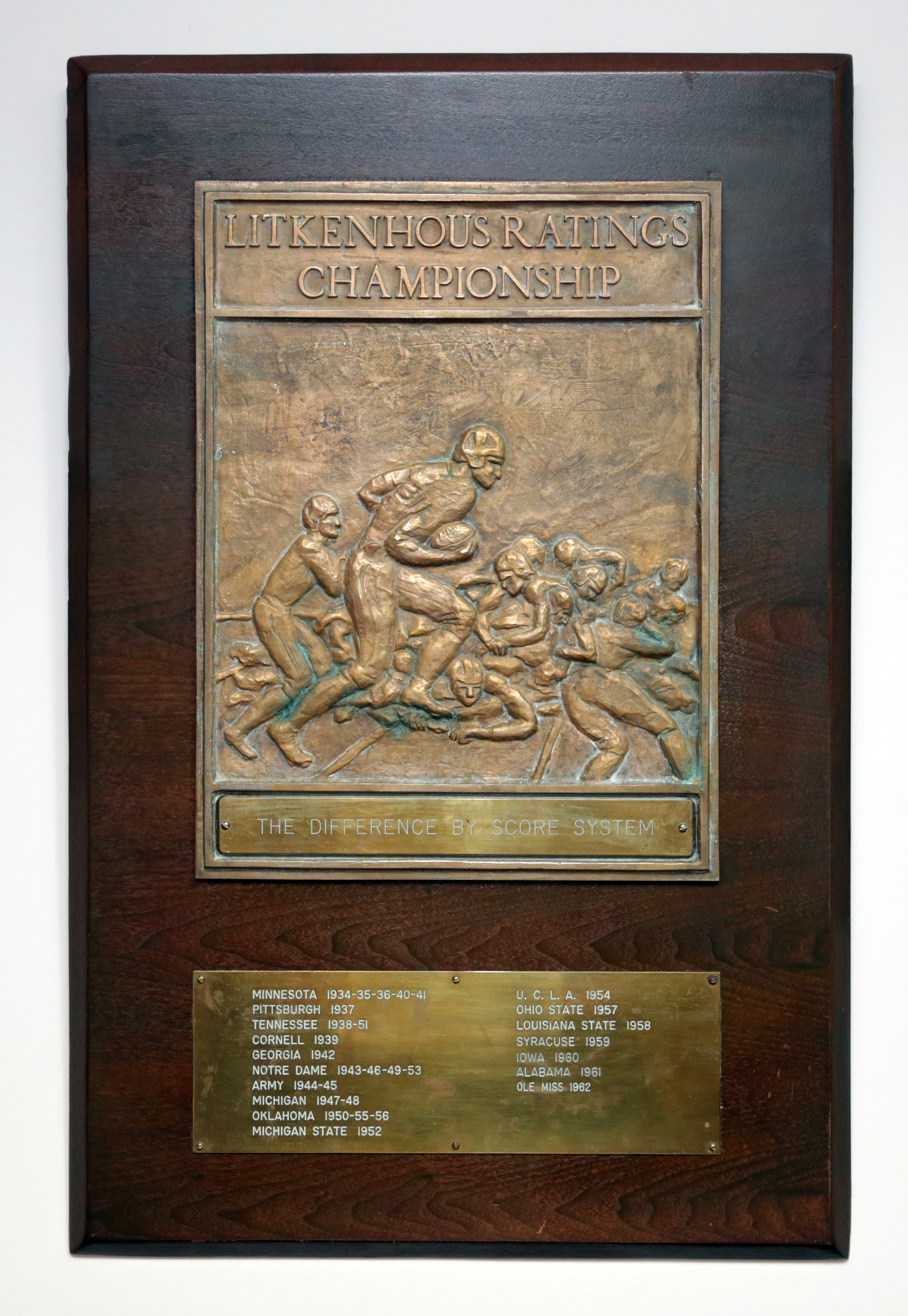
Litkenhous Ratings Championship trophy, awarded to Iowa.

The final Litkenhous Ratings were released in December 1960. The top 30 teams according to Litkenhous were:

1. Iowa (8-1) - 112.8
2. Minnesota (8-2) - 109.0
3. Ole Miss (10-0-1) - 108.6
4. Ohio State (7-2) - 107.9
5. Missouri (11-0) - 105.9
6. Rice (7-4) - 104.8
7. Kansas (5-4-1) - 103.5
8. Michigan State (6-2-1) - 102.9
9. Purdue (4-4-1) - 102.7
10. Baylor (8-3) - 102.2
11. Michigan (5-4) - 102.1
12. Arkansas - 101.8
13. Tennessee - 100.3
14. Texas - 99.9
15. Auburn - 98.9
16. Georgia Tech - 98.9
17. Alabama - 98.2
18. Florida - 97.6
19. Kentucky - 97.3
20. LSU - 97.0
21. Syracuse - 96.7
22. Washington State - 96.7
23. UCLA - 96.6
24. Illinois - 96.4
25. Northwestern - 96.4
26. Penn State - 95.2
27. Pittsburgh - 95.2
28. Georgia - 94.8
29. Muskingum - 94.3
30. TCU (4-4-2) - 94.1

== See also ==
- 1960 College Football All-America Team
