= 1960 Purdue Boilermakers football team =

American college football season

1960 Purdue Boilermakers football
- Conference: Big Ten Conference

Ranking
- Coaches: No. 15
- AP: No. 19
- Record: 4–4–1 (3–4 Big Ten)
- Head coach: Jack Mollenkopf (5th season)
- MVP: Bernie Allen
- Captains: Jerry Beabout; Maury Guttman
- Home stadium: Ross–Ade Stadium

1960 Big Ten Conference football standings
	Conf.					Overall
Team	W		L		T	W		L		T
No. 1 Minnesota +	6	–	1	–	0	8	–	2	–	0
No. 3 Iowa +	5	–	1	–	0	8	–	1	–	0
No. 8 Ohio State	5	–	2	–	0	7	–	2	–	0
No. 15 Michigan State	4	–	2	–	0	6	–	2	–	1
Illinois	3	–	4	–	0	5	–	4	–	0
Michigan	3	–	4	–	0	5	–	4	–	0
Northwestern	3	–	4	–	0	5	–	4	–	0
No. 19 Purdue	3	–	4	–	0	4	–	4	–	1
Wisconsin	2	–	5	–	0	4	–	5	–	0
Indiana	0	–	7	–	0	1	–	8	–	0
+ – Conference co-champions; Rankings from AP Poll

The 1960 Purdue Boilermakers football team was an American football team that represented Purdue University during the 1960 Big Ten Conference football season. In their fifth season under head coach Jack Mollenkopf, the Boilermakers compiled a 4–4–1 record, finished in a four-way tie for fifth place in the Big Ten Conference with a 3–4 record against conference opponents, and outscored all opponents by a combined total of 212 to 163.

== Schedule ==
Date	Opponent	Rank	Site	Result	Attendance	Source
September 24	No. 8 UCLA*		Ross–Ade Stadium; West Lafayette, IN	T 27–27	48,542	
October 1	at No. 12 Notre Dame*		Notre Dame Stadium; Notre Dame, IN (rivalry)	W 51–19	59,235	
October 8	at Wisconsin	No. 7	Camp Randall Stadium; Madison, WI	L 13–24	58,292	
October 15	No. 3 Ohio State		Ross–Ade Stadium; West Lafayette, IN	W 24–21	46,284	
October 22	at No. 1 Iowa	No. 10	Iowa Stadium; Iowa City, IA	L 14–21	59,200	
October 29	Illinois^{†}	No. 15	Ross–Ade Stadium; West Lafayette, IN (rivalry)	L 12–14	48,625	
November 5	at No. 17 Michigan State		Spartan Stadium; East Lansing, MI	L 13–17	38,481	
November 12	at No. 1 Minnesota		Memorial Stadium; Minneapolis, MN	W 23–14	61,348	
November 19	Indiana	No. 13	Ross–Ade Stadium; West Lafayette, IN (Old Oaken Bucket)	W 35–6	45,723	
*Non-conference game; ^{†}Homecoming; Rankings from AP Poll released prior to the game; Source:

== Game summaries ==
=== Notre Dame ===
Team	1	2	3	4	Total
Notre Dame	13	0	0	6	19
• Purdue	14	31	6	0	51

- Date: October 1
- Location: West Lafayette, IN
- Source: Palm Beach Post. 1960 Oct 02.

Scoring summary
1	PUR	Elwell 44-yard pass from Guttman (Allen kick)	PUR 7-0
1	ND	Scarpitto 64-yard run (kick failed)	PUR 7-6
1	PUR	Winters 78-yard run (Allen kick)	PUR 14-6
1	ND	Dabiero 24-yard pass from Haffner (Perkowski kick)	PUR 14-13
2	PUR	Mayoras 1-yard run (Allen kick)	PUR 21-13
2	PUR	Allen 24-yard field goal	PUR 24-13
2	PUR	Yakubowski 1-yard run (Allen kick)	PUR 31-13
2	PUR	Tiller 30-yard pass from Allen (Allen kick)	PUR 38-13
2	PUR	Tiller 66-yard punt return (Allen kick)	PUR 45-13
3	PUR	Allen 6-yard run (kick blocked)	PUR 51-13
4	ND	Lamonica 7-yard run (run failed)	PUR 51-19

=== Indiana ===
- Willie Jones 25 rushes, 111 yards

== Roster ==
1960 Purdue Boilermakers football team roster
Players
Coaches
Offense

Pos.	#	Name	Class
QB, K	15	Bernie Allen	Sr
OT	76	Jerry Beabout (C)	Sr
C	55	Edward Behanna	So
HB	20	Thomas Bloom	So
OT	73	Don Brumm	So
OT	72	Bill Currie	So
E	88	John Elwell	Jr
E	83	Forest Farmer	So
QB	12	Maury Guttman (C)
FB	31	Willie Jones
C	59	Phil Kardasz	Sr
G	61	Tom Krysinski
E	61	Jim Kubinski	Jr
G	67	Ron Maltony	Sr
B	30	Donn Mayoras
HB	27	Dave Miller	So
G	51	Albert Mincevich
C	53	Don Paltani	So
OT	75	Pat Russ	Jr
G	60	Stan Sczurek	Jr
HB	21	Jim Tiller	Sr
HB	43	Bob Wiater	So
FB	33	Tom Yakubowski

Defense

Pos.	#	Name	Class

Special teams

Pos.	#	Name	Class

Head coach

- Jack Mollenkopf

Coordinators/assistant coaches

Legend

- (C) Team captain
- (S) Suspended
- (I) Ineligible
- Injured
- Redshirt
