= Greg Larson =

American football player (1939–2024)

No. 53
- Positions: Center, guard, tackle

Personal information
- Born: November 15, 1939; Minneapolis, Minnesota, U.S.
- Died: June 20, 2024 (aged 84); Plymouth, Minnesota, U.S.
- Listed height: 6 ft 3 in (1.91 m)
- Listed weight: 250 lb (113 kg)

Career information
- High school: Roosevelt (Minneapolis)
- College: Minnesota
- NFL draft: 1961: 6th round, 81st overall pick
- AFL draft: 1961: 11th round, 87th overall pick

Career history
- New York Giants (1961–1973)

Awards and highlights
- Pro Bowl (1968); 62nd greatest New York Giant of all-time; National champion (1960); First-team All-Big Ten (1960)

Career NFL statistics
- Games played: 179
- Games started: 153
- Fumble recoveries: 7
- Stats at Pro Football Reference

Gregory Kenneth Larson (November 15, 1939 – June 20, 2024) was an American professional football player who was a center in the National Football League (NFL) for the New York Giants. He played college football for the Minnesota Golden Gophers and was selected in the sixth round of the 1961 NFL draft. Larson was also selected in the eleventh round of the 1961 AFL draft by the San Diego Chargers.

A three-year letterman, he was a team captain and All-Big Ten selection when the Golden Gophers won the national championship in 1960. He was inducted into the university's M Club Hall of Fame in 2010.

Larson announced his retirement as an active player on May 17, 1974, after 13 seasons as the Giants' starting center. He played in 179 games which at the time was second in team history to Joe Morrison. He missed only three games despite seven football-related operations, including two on each knee.

Larson died in Plymouth, Minnesota on June 20, 2024, at the age of 84.
