= Elbert Kimbrough =

American football player (1938–2026)

No. 83, 45
- Position: Safety

Personal information
- Born: March 24, 1938; Galesburg, Illinois, U.S.
- Died: January 2, 2026 (aged 87)
- Listed height: 5 ft 11 in (1.80 m)
- Listed weight: 196 lb (89 kg)

Career information
- High school: Galesburg
- College: Northwestern
- NFL draft: 1961: 2nd round, 18th overall pick
- AFL draft: 1961: 4th round, 29th overall pick

Career history
- Los Angeles Rams (1961); San Francisco 49ers (1962–1966); New Orleans Saints (1968)

Awards and highlights
- First-team All-Big Ten (1960); Second-team All-Big Ten (1959)

Career NFL statistics
- Interceptions: 9
- Fumble recoveries: 8
- Sacks: 2
- Stats at Pro Football Reference

Elbert Leon Kimbrough (March 24, 1938 – January 2, 2026) was an American professional football player who was a safety for seven seasons with the Los Angeles Rams, San Francisco 49ers, and New Orleans Saints of the National Football League (NFL). He played college football for the Northwestern Wildcats.

== Biography ==
Elbert Kimbrough was born in Galesburg, Illinois, on March 24, 1938. He attended Galesburg High School in that city, where, together with his twin brother Albert, he played football and basketball.

His twin brother, Albert, also played American football. Albert died in May 2024.

Elbert Kimbrough died on January 2, 2026, at the age of 87.
