= Murray Warmath =

American football player and coach (1912–2011)

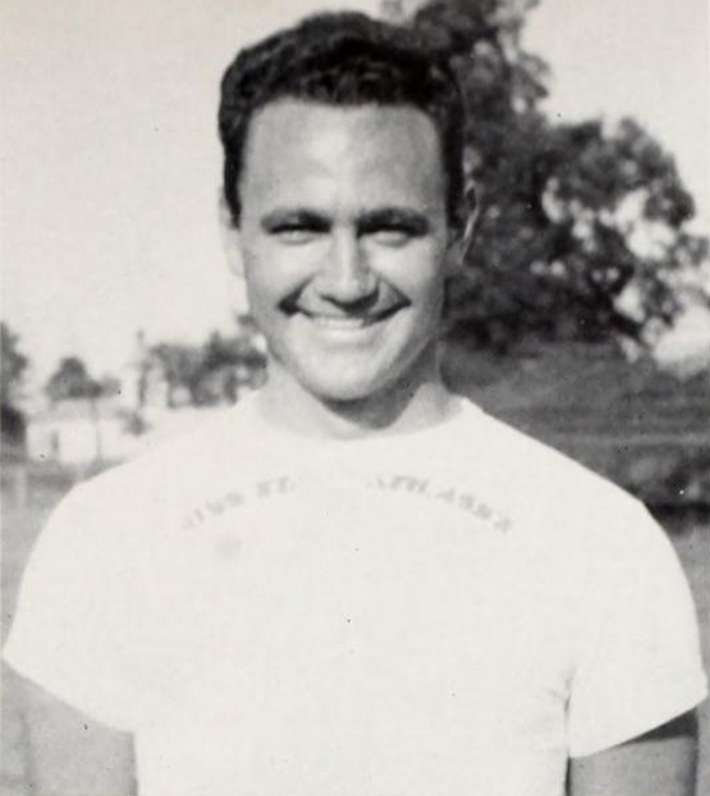
- Warmath pictured in Reveille 1942, Mississippi State yearbook

Biographical details
- Born: December 26, 1912; Humboldt, Tennessee, U.S.
- Died: March 16, 2011 (aged 98); Bloomington, Minnesota, U.S.

Playing career
- 1932–1934: Tennessee
- Positions: End, guard

Coaching career (HC unless noted)
- 1935–1938: Tennessee (line/ends)
- 1939–1942: Mississippi State (line)
- 1945–1948: Tennessee (line)
- 1949–1951: Army (line)
- 1952–1953: Mississippi State
- 1954–1971: Minnesota

Head coaching record
- Overall: 97–84–10
- Bowls: 1–1

Accomplishments and honors

Championships
- 1 National (1960); 2 Big Ten (1960, 1967)

Awards
- First-team All-SEC (1934); AFCA Coach of the Year (1960); Eddie Robinson Coach of the Year (1960)

Murray Warmath (December 26, 1912 – March 16, 2011) was an American college football player and coach. He served as the head football coach at Mississippi State University from 1952 to 1953 and at the University of Minnesota from 1954 to 1971, compiling a career head coaching record of 97–84–10. In 1960, Warmath led the Minnesota Golden Gophers to a share of the Big Ten Conference title, an appearance in the Rose Bowl, and a national championship, the program's most recent to date. The following season, Minnesota placed second in the Big Ten Conference and returned to the Rose Bowl. Warmath's 1967 squad captured a share of a second Big Ten championship.

== Playing and coaching career ==
Warmath played college football for the Tennessee Volunteers under legendary coach Robert Neyland. After graduation from college, Warmath was the line coach for one season and end coach for three seasons at Tennessee before entering military service during World War II. After the service, he was named head line coach at Tennessee, and then served in the same capacity at the United States Military Academy under Red Blaik; Vince Lombardi was the backfield coach at Army during those years. Warmath then spent two seasons (1952–1953) as head coach at Mississippi State University before resigning at the end of the 1953 season to take the Minnesota job.

After coming to Minnesota, Warmath had immediate success, leading the Gophers to a 7–2 record in his first season and a 6–1–2 record in 1956. However, Warmath came under fire after three straight losing seasons in which the Gophers finished a combined 6–20, including the 1958 campaign in which the Gophers won only one game and the 1959 campaign in which the Gophers finished last in the Big Ten and won two games. Despite fans throwing garbage on his lawn and talk from Gopher boosters that the University should buy out the last two years of his contract, Warmath would survive the storm and the following season the Gophers won the Big Ten title, with an 8–1 record, and were declared national champions by the Associated Press and United Press International after the regular season was completed. Minnesota subsequently lost the Rose Bowl Game.

While at Minnesota, Warmath became one of the most successful coaches in Gophers' history, leading the team to two Big Ten titles and two Rose Bowls. His 1961 team was awarded a Rose Bowl berth by default after Ohio State, the conference champion, declined the invitation. The Big Ten Conference, at the time, did not allow the conference champion to go to the Rose Bowl back-to-back. Warmath is the last Gophers coach to win a national championship, a Big Ten title, or a Rose Bowl. His 18-year tenure is the second-longest in school history behind only Henry L. Williams, and his 87 wins are second in school history behind only Bernie Bierman.

While coach, Warmath became known as a catalyst for social change, as he was one of the first major college coaches to take multiple black athletes in a single recruiting class. "I have no prejudice against Negro players. I am interested in good football players," he declared at his first press conference in 1954. Quarterback Sandy Stephens, who was installed as the starting quarterback as a sophomore in 1959, was the first black All-American quarterback. With the national exposure of his bowl appearances, Warmath was able to recruit other top black athletes including future NFL stars Bobby Bell, Carl Eller, and Aaron Brown. Ironically, the year Warmath won the wire service polls national championship, The University of Mississippi, Warmath's archrival at Mississippi State, only narrowly lost the AP championship vote, but was declared the Football Writers Association of America national champion after it won the Sugar Bowl and all the bowl games were completed. Ole Miss, like Mississippi State and most historically white southern universities at the time, would not accept black athletes. Many consider it conceivable that this, along with other negative facts and stereotypes about it and the state of Mississippi, could have cost Ole Miss the AP title.

Warmath's tenure crested after the 1967 Big Ten title season. Following a 6–4 record in 1968, he posted losing records in his final three years. Following the 1971 season, Cal Stoll was hired as coach of the Gophers and Warmath was made an assistant to the athletic director. Warmath stayed in that role until 1978 when he took a job with the Minnesota Vikings as an assistant coach, a position he held for two seasons before becoming a regional scout for the team.

In 18 seasons at Minnesota, Warmath's teams amassed an 87–78–7 (.526) record and won eight games in a season three times. He compiled a career record of 97–84–10.

== Later life ==
In 1992, Warmath worked with author Mike Wilkinson to publish a biography entitled The Autumn Warrior in which he recounts his 65-year association with football. Warmath remained in Minnesota after he retired from coaching and made public appearances well into his 90s and gave an extended interview as recently as 2007. The Gophers locker room at Minnesota's TCF Bank Stadium, which opened in 2009, is named after Warmath. Warmath died on March 16, 2011, at the retirement community in Bloomington, Minnesota, where he resided. Minnesota Governor Mark Dayton declared March 21, 2011, the date of his funeral at St. Stephen's Episcopal Church in Edina, Minnesota, "Murray Warmath Day".

== Head coaching record ==
Warmath was the head football coach at the University of Minnesota for 18 seasons from 1954 to 1971. The team had an 87-78-7 overall record. In the Big Ten they went 65-57-4 record and won two conference titles. The 1960 team claimed the national title, the most recent for the Golden Gophers. Eleven players were awarded All-American status. Two of Minnesota's five Chicago Tribune Silver Football awards were given under Warmath. Twenty-six players were named All-Big Ten first team. Eighteen players were named All-Big Ten second team. Five players were named Academic All-Americans. Thirty-one players were named Academic All-Big Ten.

Year	Team	Overall	Conference	Standing	Bowl/playoffs	Coaches^{#}	AP^{°}
Mississippi State Maroons (Southeastern Conference) (1952–1953)
1952	Mississippi State	5–4	3–4	7th			
1953	Mississippi State	5–2–3	3–1–3	5th			
Mississippi State:		10–6–3	6–5–3				
Minnesota Golden Gophers (Big Ten Conference) (1954–1971)
1954	Minnesota	7–2	4–2	4th		20	
1955	Minnesota	3–6	2–5	8th			
1956	Minnesota	6–1–2	4–1–2	T–2nd		9	12
1957	Minnesota	4–5	3–5	8th			
1958	Minnesota	1–8	1–6	9th			
1959	Minnesota	2–7	1–6	10th			
1960	Minnesota	8–2	5–1	T–1st	L Rose	1	1
1961	Minnesota	8–2	6–1	2nd	W Rose	6	6
1962	Minnesota	6–2–1	5–2	2nd		10	10
1963	Minnesota	3–6	2–5	9th			
1964	Minnesota	5–4	4–3	T–4th			
1965	Minnesota	5–4–1	5–2	T–3rd			
1966	Minnesota	4–5–1	3–3–1	5th			
1967	Minnesota	8–2	6–1	T–1st		14	
1968	Minnesota	6–4	5–2	T–3rd		18	
1969	Minnesota	4–5–1	4–3	4th			
1970	Minnesota	3–6–1	2–4–1	7th			
1971	Minnesota	4–7	3–5	T–6th			
Minnesota:		87–78–7	65–57–4				
Total:		97–84–10					
National championship Conference title Conference division title or championship game berth
^{#}Rankings from final Coaches Poll.; ^{°}Rankings from final AP Poll.

== See also ==
- List of presidents of the American Football Coaches Association
