= Joe Rutgens =

American football player (born 1939)

No. 72
- Position: Defensive tackle

Personal information
- Born: January 26, 1939 (age 87); Cedar Point, Illinois, U.S.
- Listed height: 6 ft 2 in (1.88 m)
- Listed weight: 255 lb (116 kg)

Career information
- High school: LaSalle-Peru Twp. (LaSalle, Illinois)
- College: Illinois
- NFL draft: 1961: 1st round, 3rd overall pick
- AFL draft: 1961: 1st round, 5th overall pick

Career history
- Washington Redskins (1961–1970)

Awards and highlights
- 2× Pro Bowl (1963, 1965); Third-team All-American (1960); 2× First-team All-Big Ten (1959, 1960)

Career NFL statistics
- Games played: 110
- Fumble recoveries: 6
- Fumble recovery yards: 36
- Stats at Pro Football Reference

Joseph Casimiere Rutgens (born January 26, 1939) is an American former professional football player who was a defensive tackle for the Washington Redskins of the National Football League (NFL). He went to two Pro Bowls during his nine-year career. He played college football for the Illinois Fighting Illini and was selected in the first round of the 1961 NFL draft with the third overall pick. Rutgens was also selected in the first round (fourth overall) of the 1961 AFL draft by the Oakland Raiders.

In 2008 Rutgens was selected as one of the top 10 defensive lineman in the history of University of Illinois.

Rutgens was an All-American in 1960 and was a first-team All-Big Ten selection by the Associated Press in 1959 and 1960. He also was a second-team All-Big Ten pick by United Press in both 1959 and 1960.
