= Larry Ferguson (gridiron football) =

American football player (1940–2015)

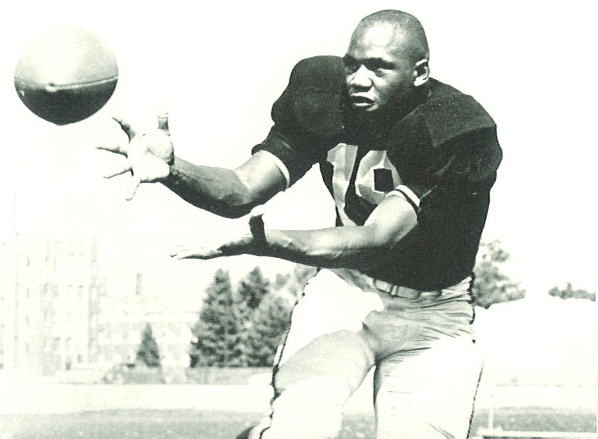
- Ferguson from 1963 Hawkeye

No. 46, 10, 14, 30
- Position: Halfback

Personal information
- Born: March 19, 1940; Madison, Illinois, U.S.
- Died: May 31, 2015 (aged 75); Chicago Heights, Illinois, U.S.
- Listed height: 5 ft 10 in (1.78 m)
- Listed weight: 195 lb (88 kg)

Career information
- College: Iowa
- NFL draft: 1962: 4th round, 52nd overall pick
- AFL draft: 1962: 17th round, 129th overall pick

Career history
- Detroit Lions (1963); Edmonton Eskimos (1964–1965); Toronto Argonauts (1965–1967); Chicago Owls (1967-1969)

Awards and highlights
- First-team All-American (1960); 2× First-team All-Big Ten (1960, 1962)

Career NFL statistics
- Rushing yards: 23
- Rushing average: 1.8
- Receptions: 2
- Receiving yards: 8
- Stats at Pro Football Reference

Larry Pearly Ferguson (March 19, 1940 – May 31, 2015) was a college football player for the University of Iowa. He was named a first-team All-American in 1960 and played one season for the Detroit Lions of the National Football League (NFL), as well as five seasons in the Canadian Football League (CFL) with the Edmonton Eskimos and Toronto Argonauts.

== College career ==
Larry Ferguson only carried the ball nine times for Iowa as a sophomore in 1959, but he gained national attention as a junior in 1960. He had an 85-yard touchdown run in the season opener against Oregon State, and he had a 70-yard interception return for a touchdown the following week. In Iowa’s final conference game that season, Ferguson had a 91-yard touchdown run against Ohio State to help give Iowa a 35-12 victory and a share of the 1960 Big Ten title. He was voted first-team all-Big Ten and first-team All-American as a junior in 1960.

In 1961, Ferguson suffered a season ending knee injury in the first quarter of the first game. He was given a medical redshirt and returned for his senior season in 1962. As a senior in 1962, Larry Ferguson led the Hawkeyes in rushing with 547 yards and was named all-Big Ten. As team captain, he helped lead Iowa to victories over Michigan and Ohio State, the first time Iowa had ever defeated both of those schools in the same season.

Ferguson played in the 1963 College All-Star Game. His season average of 7.39 yards per carry in 1960 still stands as a school record. In 1989, Iowa fans selected an all-time University of Iowa football team during the 100th anniversary celebration of Iowa football, and Larry Ferguson was an honorable mention selection at running back.

== Professional career ==
Ferguson played one season with the Detroit Lions of the National Football League (NFL) in 1963. He then played for the Edmonton Eskimos of the Canadian Football League (CFL) from 1964 to 1965 and the Toronto Argonauts of the CFL from 1965 to 1967.
