= Wilburn Hollis =

American football player (1940–2024)

Wilburn Hollis (November 12, 1940 – February 1, 2024) was an American college football player for the University of Iowa from 1959–1961 and one of the first African Americans to earn All-American honors at quarterback. He led the Hawkeyes to a Big Ten championship as a junior in 1960 and was named a second team All-American that season.

== Background ==
Wilburn Hollis was born in Pontotoc County, Mississippi, but moved to Boys Town, Nebraska, at age 10. At Boys Town, Hollis played football, basketball, baseball, and track. He was recruited to Iowa by Coach Forest Evashevski and arrived in Iowa City in 1958.

Hollis died on February 1, 2024, at the age of 83.

== Playing career ==
After sitting behind Olen Treadway as a sophomore in 1959, Hollis ascended to the starting quarterback position as a junior and helped lead Iowa to one of its most successful seasons. Against Wisconsin in 1960, Hollis threw the winning touchdown pass to Sammie Harris with only 52 seconds remaining in a 28–21 victory. That performance earned him National Back of the Week honors from the Associated Press, and Iowa was elevated to the No. 1 ranking in the nation after the win. Iowa spent three weeks at No. 1 and won a share of the Big Ten title with an 8–1 record.

Wilburn Hollis scored 68 points in 1960, the most points scored at Iowa by a single player since 1922. He was an all-Big Ten selection and a second team All-American as a junior.

Iowa began Hollis' senior season in 1961 as the No. 1 ranked team in the nation in preseason. Hollis led Iowa to a win in the opening game, rushing for 124 yards and two touchdowns in a 28–7 victory. However, Hollis fractured his right wrist in the second game of the season, and his Iowa career came to a premature end.

== See also ==
- 1960 College Football All-America Team
