= 1960 All-Big Ten Conference football team =

American college football all-star team

The 1960 All-Big Ten Conference football team consists of American football players chosen by various organizations for All-Big Ten Conference teams for the 1960 Big Ten Conference football season.

== All-Big Ten selections ==
=== Quarterbacks ===
- Tom Matte, Ohio State (AP-1 [halfback]; UPI-1 [quarterback])
- Wilburn Hollis, Iowa (AP-1)
- Ron Miller, Wisconsin (AP-2)
- Bernie Allen, Purdue (AP-2)
- Dick Thornton, Northwestern (AP-3)
- Sandy Stephens, Minnesota (AP-3)

=== Halfbacks ===
- Larry Ferguson, Iowa (AP-1; UPI-1)
- Herb Adderly, Michigan State (UPI-1)
- Bill Brown, Illinois (AP-2)

=== Fullbacks ===
- Bob Ferguson, Ohio State (AP-1; UPI-1)
- Willie Jones, Purdue (AP-2)
- Joe Williams, Iowa (AP-3)
- Mike Stock, Northwestern (AP-3)

=== Ends ===
- Earl Faison, Indiana (AP-1; UPI-1)
- Elbert Kimbrough, Northwestern (AP-1; UPI-1)
- Pat Richter, Wisconsin (AP-2)
- Tom Perdue, Ohio State (AP-2)
- Bob Johnson, Michigan (AP-3)
- Bob Deegan, Minnesota (AP-3)

=== Tackles ===
- Jerry Beabout, Purdue (AP-1; UPI-1)
- Joe Rutgens, Illinois (AP-1)
- Jim Tyrer, Ohio State (AP-2; UPI-1)
- Francis Brixius, Minnesota (AP-2)
- Wayne Chamberlain, Northwestern (AP-3)
- Bobby Bell, Minnesota (AP-3)

=== Guards ===
- Tom Brown, Minnesota (AP-1; UPI-1)
- Mark Manders, Iowa (AP-1; UPI-1)
- Mike Ingram, Ohio State (AP-2)
- Ron Maltony, Purdue (AP-2)
- Stan Sczurek, Purdue (AP-3)
- Dick Syring, Michigan (AP-3)

=== Centers ===
- Greg Larson, Minnesota (AP-1; UPI-1)
- Jerry Smith, Michigan (AP-2; UPI-2)
- Bill Van Buren, Iowa (AP-3)

== Key ==
AP = Associated Press

UPI = United Press International, selected by the conference coaches

Bold = Consensus first-team selection of both the AP and UPI

== See also ==
- 1960 College Football All-America Team
