= 1961 American Football League draft =

American Football League draft

1961 AFL draft

General information
- Dates: November 21–22, 1960 & December 5–6, 1960

Overview
- 240 total selections in 30 rounds
- League: AFL
- First selection: Ken Rice, OT; Buffalo Bills
- Mr. Irrelevant: Mike McKeever, G San Diego Chargers
- Hall of Famers: 6

The 1961 American Football League draft, was held in 1960 because another league was in competition for the class of 1961 college stars, the American Football League draft for 1961 graduates. A six-round telephone draft was held on November 21 and 22, 1960, that saw the Buffalo Bills select Auburn's Ken Rice as the overall first draft pick. The draft was completed on December 5 and 6, with rounds seven through thirty. The San Diego Chargers were still the "Los Angeles Chargers" in this draft, as their relocation was not announced until late January 1961.

== Player selections ==
=== Round 1 ===
Pick #	AFL team	Player	Position	College
1	Buffalo Bills	Ken Rice	OT	Auburn
2	New York Titans	Tom Brown	G	Minnesota
3	Boston Patriots	Tommy Mason	RB	Tulane
4	Denver Broncos	Bob Gaiters	HB	New Mexico State
5	Oakland Raiders	Joe Rutgens	DT	Illinois
6	Dallas Texans	E. J. Holub	C / LB	Texas Tech
7	San Diego Chargers	Earl Faison	DE	Indiana
8	Houston Oilers	Mike Ditka	TE	Pittsburgh

=== Round 2 ===
Pick #	AFL team	Player	Position	College
9	Buffalo Bills	Billy Shaw	G	Georgia Tech
10	New York Titans	Herb Adderley	HB	Michigan State
11	Denver Broncos	Jerry Hill	RB	Wyoming
12	Boston Patriots	Rip Hawkins	LB	North Carolina
13	Oakland Raiders	George Fleming	HB	Washington
14	Dallas Texans	Bob Lilly	DT	TCU
15	Houston Oilers	Tom Goode	C	Mississippi State
16	San Diego Chargers	Keith Lincoln	FB	Washington State

=== Round 3 ===
Pick #	AFL team	Player	Position	College
17	Buffalo Bills	Art Baker	FB	Syracuse
18	Buffalo Bills	Tom Gilburg	OT	Syracuse
19	Boston Patriots	Dan LaRose	OT	Missouri
20	Denver Broncos	Bo Strange	C	LSU
21	Oakland Raiders	Myron Pottios	LB	Notre Dame
22	Dallas Texans	Jim Tyrer	OT	Ohio State
23	San Diego Chargers	Marlin McKeever	LB	USC
24	Houston Oilers	Walter Suggs	OT	Mississippi State

=== Round 4 ===
Pick #	AFL team	Player	Position	College
25	Buffalo Bills	Stew Barber	OT	Penn State
26	Denver Broncos	Sonny Davis	LB	Baylor
27	Denver Broncos	Ron McDole	DE	Nebraska
28	Boston Patriots	Mike Zeno	G	VPI
29	Oakland Raiders	Elbert Kimbrough	S	Northwestern
30	Dallas Texans	Claude Moorman	E	Duke
31	Houston Oilers	Bobby Walden	HB / P	Georgia
32	San Diego Chargers	Jimmy Johnson	CB	UCLA

=== Round 5 ===
Pick #	AFL team	Player	Position	College
33	Buffalo Bills	Norm Snead	QB	Wake Forest
34	New York Titans	Tom Matte	RB	Ohio State
35	Boston Patriots	Fran Tarkenton	QB	Georgia
36	Denver Broncos	Charley Cowan	OT	New Mexico Highlands
37	Oakland Raiders	Dick Norman	QB	Stanford
38	Dallas Texans	Jerry Mays	DE	SMU
39	San Diego Chargers	Billy Kilmer	QB	UCLA
40	Houston Oilers	Monte Lee	LB	Texas

=== Round 6 ===
Pick #	AFL team	Player	Position	College
41	Buffalo Bills	Fred Brown	HB	Georgia
42	New York Titans	Bill Brown	RB	Illinois
43	Denver Broncos	Dale Evans	HB	Kansas State
44	Boston Patriots	Larry Eisenhauer	DE	Boston College
45	Oakland Raiders	Bobby Crespino	SE	Ole Miss
46	Houston Oilers	Jake Gibbs	QB	Ole Miss
47	San Diego Chargers	Calvin Bird	HB	Kentucky
48	San Diego Chargers	Cliff Roberts	OT	Illinois

=== Round 7 ===
Pick #	AFL team	Player	Position	College
49	Denver Broncos	Pat Patchen	E	Florida
50	Boston Patriots	Paul Terhes	QB	Bucknell
51	Oakland Raiders	Ray Purdin	HB	Northwestern
52	Buffalo Bills	Al Bemiller	C	Syracuse
53	Dallas Texans	Fred Arbanas	TE	Michigan State
54	New York Titans	Fred Mautino	E	Syracuse
55	San Diego Chargers	Claude Gibson	CB	NC State
56	Houston Oilers	Dick Reynolds	OT	NC State

=== Round 8 ===
Pick #	AFL team	Player	Position	College
57	Oakland Raiders	Dick Price	G	Ole Miss
58	Oakland Raiders	Tom Watkins	HB	Iowa State
59	Boston Patriots	Charlie Long	G	Chattanooga
60	Buffalo Bills	Chuck Linning	OT	Miami (FL)
61	New York Titans	Harold Beaty	OT	Oklahoma State
62	Dallas Texans	John O'Day	OT	Miami (FL)
63	Houston Oilers	Houston Antwine	DT	Southern Illinois
64	San Diego Chargers	Charley Johnson	QB	New Mexico State

=== Round 9 ===
Pick #	AFL team	Player	Position	College
65	Denver Broncos	Phil Nugent	S	Tulane
66	Boston Patriots	Roland Lakes	DT	Wichita
67	Oakland Raiders	Lowndes Shingler	QB	Clemson
68	Buffalo Bills	Billy Majors	DB	Tennessee
69	Dallas Texans	Dick Mills	G	Pittsburgh
70	New York Titans	Bernie Casey	HB	Bowling Green
71	San Diego Chargers	Bob Scarpitto	FL	Notre Dame
72	Houston Oilers	Ralph White	OT	Bowling Green

=== Round 10 ===
Pick #	AFL team	Player	Position	College
73	Denver Broncos	Charley Sturgeon	HB	Kentucky
74	Oakland Raiders	Ken Petersen	OT	Utah
75	Boston Patriots	Dick Mueller	E	Kentucky
76	Buffalo Bills	Don Kern	HB	VMI
77	New York Titans	Joe Scibelli	G	American International
78	Dallas Texans	Jerry Daniels	E	Ole Miss
79	Houston Oilers	Charley Lee	C	Iowa
80	San Diego Chargers	Willie Hector	G	Pacific

=== Round 11 ===
Pick #	AFL team	Player	Position	College
81	Denver Broncos	John Simko	E	Augustana (SD)
82	Boston Patriots	Mel West	HB	Missouri
83	Oakland Raiders	Doug Mayberry	FB	Utah State
84	Buffalo Bills	Roy Wall	HB	North Carolina
85	Dallas Texans	Marvin Tibbets	HB	Georgia Tech
86	New York Titans	Art Gilmore	HB	Oregon State
87	San Diego Chargers	Greg Larson	C	Minnesota
88	Houston Oilers	Bob Bird	G	Bowling Green

=== Round 12 ===
Pick #	AFL team	Player	Position	College
89	Denver Broncos	Jerry Miller	E	Howard Payne
90	Oakland Raiders	Bob Schmitz	G	Montana State
91	Boston Patriots	Wayne Harris	C	Arkansas
92	Buffalo Bills	Floyd Powers	G	Mississippi State
93	New York Titans	Norris Stevenson	HB	Missouri
94	Dallas Texans	Paul Hynes	DB	Louisiana Tech
95	Houston Oilers	Bob McLeod	TE	Abilene Christian
96	San Diego Chargers	Hezekiah Braxton	FB	Virginia Union

=== Round 13 ===
Pick #	AFL team	Player	Position	College
97	Denver Broncos	Ron Greene	G	Washington State
98	Boston Patriots	Dan Underwood	OT	McNeese State
99	Oakland Raiders	Jerry Burch	WR	Georgia Tech
100	Buffalo Bills	Tom Causey	E	Louisiana Tech
101	Dallas Texans	Glynn Gregory	E	SMU
102	New York Titans	Joe Wendryhoski	C	Illinois
103	San Diego Chargers	Dale Messer	HB	Fresno State
104	Houston Oilers	Gerald Hinton	G	Louisiana Tech

=== Round 14 ===
Pick #	AFL team	Player	Position	College
105	Denver Broncos	Bill Cooper	FB	Muskingum
106	Oakland Raiders	Clark Miller	DE	Utah State
107	Boston Patriots	Jim Wright	DB	Memphis State
108	Buffalo Bills	Ron Kostelnik	DT	Cincinnati
109	New York Titans	Jim Cunningham	FB	Pittsburgh
110	Dallas Texans	Curtis McClinton	FB	Kansas
111	Houston Oilers	Jimmy King	OT	Clemson
112	San Diego Chargers	Billy Wilson	OT	Auburn

=== Round 15 ===
Pick #	AFL team	Player	Position	College
113	Denver Broncos	Willie Crafts	G	Texas A&I
114	Oakland Raiders	Bob Coolbaugh	FL	Richmond
115	Buffalo Bills	Jerry Frye	E	South Carolina
116	Dallas Texans	Roy Lee Rambo	G	TCU
117	Dallas Texans	Ed Nutting	OT	Georgia Tech
118	New York Titans	Irv Cross	E	Northwestern
119	San Diego Chargers	Ernie Ladd	DT	Grambling
120	Houston Oilers	Dennis Ferriter	C	Marquette

=== Round 16 ===
Pick #	AFL team	Player	Position	College
121	Denver Broncos	Jim Larkin	OT	Hillsdale
122	Oakland Raiders	Chuck Lamson	HB	Wyoming
123	Boston Patriots	George Balthazar	OT	Tennessee A&I
124	Buffalo Bills	Vince Scott	E	Maryland
125	New York Titans	Jerry Steffen	HB	Colorado
126	Dallas Texans	Aaron Thomas	TE	Oregon State
127	Houston Oilers	Larry Wood	HB	Northwestern
128	San Diego Chargers	Bud Whitehead	S	Florida State

=== Round 17 ===
Pick #	AFL team	Player	Position	College
129	Denver Broncos	Chuck Weiss	FB	Colorado
130	Boston Patriots	Ray Ratkowski	HB	Notre Dame
131	Oakland Raiders	Joe Novsek	DE	Tulsa
132	Buffalo Bills	Wayne Wolff	G	Wake Forest
133	Dallas Texans	Jarrell Williams	HB	Arkansas
134	New York Titans	Mike Pyle	OT	Yale
135	San Diego Chargers	Reggie Carolan	TE	Idaho
136	Houston Oilers	Sam Fewell	OT	South Carolina

=== Round 18 ===
Pick #	AFL team	Player	Position	College
137	Denver Broncos	Chick Graning	HB	Georgia Tech
138	Oakland Raiders	Joe Krakoski	S	Illinois
139	Boston Patriots	Tom Rodgers	HB	Kentucky
140	Buffalo Bills	John Bodkin	G	South Carolina
141	New York Titans	Alfred Bentley	E	Arkansas State
142	Dallas Texans	Ron Hartline	FB	Oklahoma
143	Houston Oilers	Ike Grimsley	HB	Michigan State
144	San Diego Chargers	Ed Dyas	FB	Auburn

=== Round 19 ===
Pick #	AFL team	Player	Position	College
145	Denver Broncos	John Hobbs	G	Maryland State
146	Boston Patriots	Joe Bellino	HB	Navy
147	Oakland Raiders	Charley Fuller	HB	San Francisco State
148	Buffalo Bills	Charley Barnes	E	Northeast Louisiana State
149	Dallas Texans	Frank Jackson	FL	SMU
150	New York Titans	Jim Kerr	S	Penn State
151	San Diego Chargers	Jack Espenship	HB	Florida
152	Houston Oilers	Myron Pearson	HB	Colorado State

=== Round 20 ===
Pick #	AFL team	Player	Position	College
153	Denver Broncos	Buck McLeod	OT	Baylor
154	Oakland Raiders	Preston Powell	FB	Grambling
155	Boston Patriots	Clarence Childs	CB	Florida A&M
156	Buffalo Bills	Everett Cloud	HB	Maryland
157	New York Titans	Neil Plumley	OT	Oregon State
158	Dallas Texans	Bobby Lane	LB	Baylor
159	Houston Oilers	Lewis Johnson	HB	Florida A&M
160	San Diego Chargers	Mike Lucci	C	Tennessee

=== Round 21 ===
Pick #	AFL team	Player	Position	College
161	Denver Broncos	Jim Morgan	HB	Iowa State
162	Boston Patriots	Don Oakes	OT	VPI
163	Oakland Raiders	Mike Jones	QB	San José State
164	Buffalo Bills	Larry Vargo	S	Detroit
165	Dallas Texans	Dick Thornton	QB	Northwestern
166	New York Titans	Bob Brooks	FB	Ohio
167	San Diego Chargers	Gene Gaines	HB	UCLA
168	Houston Oilers	Ron Miller	QB	Wisconsin

=== Round 22 ===
Pick #	AFL team	Player	Position	College
169	Denver Broncos	Tom Hackler	E	Tennessee Tech
170	Oakland Raiders	Blayne Jones	G	Idaho State
171	Boston Patriots	Bob Johnson	E	Michigan
172	Buffalo Bills	Charlie Baker	OT	Tennessee
173	New York Titans	Wayne Fontes	DB	Michigan State
174	Dallas Texans	Ed Sharockman	CB	Pittsburgh
175	Houston Oilers	Bob Kelly	OT	New Mexico State
176	San Diego Chargers	John Brown	OT	Syracuse

=== Round 23 ===
Pick #	AFL team	Player	Position	College
177	Denver Broncos	Tom Jewel	OT	Idaho State
178	Boston Patriots	Darrel DeDecker	C	Illinois
179	Oakland Raiders	Roger Fisher	C	Utah State
180	Buffalo Bills	Red Mack	TE	Notre Dame
181	Dallas Texans	Lou Zivkovich	OT	New Mexico State
182	New York Titans	Mickey Walker	G	Michigan State
183	San Diego Chargers	Glenn Bass	SE	East Carolina
184	Houston Oilers	Jim Anderson	FB	Ole Miss

=== Round 24 ===
Pick #	AFL team	Player	Position	College
185	Denver Broncos	E. A. Sims	E	New Mexico State
186	Oakland Raiders	Jack Novak	G	Miami (FL)
187	Boston Patriots	Don Webb	CB	Iowa State
188	Buffalo Bills	Frank Jackunas	C	Detroit
189	New York Titans	Howard Dyer	QB	VMI
190	Dallas Texans	Pat Dye	G	Georgia
191	Houston Oilers	Ken Gregory	E	Whittier
192	San Diego Chargers	Ben Balme	G	Yale

=== Round 25 ===
Pick #	AFL team	Player	Position	College
193	Denver Broncos	Pete Samms	OT	Central State (OK)
194	Boston Patriots	Bob Minihane	OT	Boston University
195	Oakland Raiders	Paul Yanke	E	Northwestern
196	Buffalo Bills	Jack Harbaugh	HB	Bowling Green
197	Dallas Texans	Ray Ramsey	QB	Adams State
198	New York Titans	Andy Griffith	HB	American International
199	San Diego Chargers	Donald Coffey	WR	Memphis State
200	Houston Oilers	Jack Kreider	HB	Tulsa

=== Round 26 ===
Pick #	AFL team	Player	Position	College
201	Denver Broncos	Sam Smith	HB	Florence State
202	Oakland Raiders	Dean Hinshaw	OT	Stanford
203	Boston Patriots	Charley Granger	OT	Southern
204	Buffalo Bills	Lorenzo Stanford	OT	North Carolina A&T
205	New York Titans	Bobby Smith	S	UCLA
206	Dallas Texans	Danny House	HB	Davidson
207	Houston Oilers	Don Fuell	QB	Mississippi Southern
208	San Diego Chargers	Bill Kinnune	G	Washington

=== Round 27 ===
Pick #	AFL team	Player	Position	College
209	Denver Broncos	Don Olson	HB	Nebraska
210	Boston Patriots	Terry Huxhold	OT	Wisconsin
211	Oakland Raiders	Clair Appledoorn	E	San José State
212	Buffalo Bills	Bob Allen	E	Wake Forest
213	Dallas Texans	Bob Schloredt	QB	Washington
214	New York Titans	Moses Gray	OT	Indiana
215	San Diego Chargers	Luther Hayes	E	USC
216	Houston Oilers	Boyd King	C	Rice

=== Round 28 ===
Pick #	AFL team	Player	Position	College
217	Denver Broncos	Wayne Lee	G	Colorado State
218	Oakland Raiders	Dave Grosz	QB	Oregon
219	Boston Patriots	Bryant Harvard	QB	Auburn
220	Buffalo Bills	Jason Harness	E	Michigan State
221	New York Titans	Fred Cox	HB / K	Pittsburgh
222	Dallas Texans	Bill Stine	G	Michigan
223	Houston Oilers	John Frongillo	C	Baylor
224	San Diego Chargers	Chuck Allen	LB	Washington

=== Round 29 ===
Pick #	AFL team	Player	Position	College
225	Denver Broncos	Archie Cobb	OT	Nebraska
226	Boston Patriots	Ernie McMillan	OT	Illinois
227	Oakland Raiders	Ed Morris	OT	Indiana
228	Buffalo Bills	Mike Stock	HB	Northwestern
229	Dallas Texans	Lonnie Caddell	FB	Rice
230	San Diego Chargers	Dan Ficca	G	USC
231	Houston Oilers	Tom Lewis	E	Lake Forest
232	Houston Oilers	Errol Linden	OT	Houston

=== Round 30 ===
Pick #	AFL team	Player	Position	College
233	Denver Broncos	Dave Mills	HB	Northeast Missouri State
234	Oakland Raiders	Bill Face	HB	Stanford
235	Boston Patriots	George Hultz	DT	Mississippi Southern
236	Buffalo Bills	Billy Martin	HB	Minnesota
237	New York Titans	Bill Minnerly	HB	Connecticut
238	Dallas Texans	Cedric Price	E	Kansas State
239	Houston Oilers	Jim Stroud	OT	Rice
240	San Diego Chargers	Mike McKeever	G	USC

== Notable undrafted players ==
^{†}	= AFL All-Star

Original NFL team	Player	Pos.	College	Notes
Dallas Texans	Dave Grayson ^{†}	CB	Oregon	
Denver Broncos	Donnie Stone ^{†}	RB	Arkansas	
Denver Broncos	Jerry Sturm ^{†}	C	Illinois	
New York Titans	Dainard Paulson ^{†}	S	Oregon State	
San Diego Chargers	Bo Roberson ^{†}	WR	Cornell	

== See also ==
- List of American Football League players
- American Football League draft
- List of professional American football drafts
