= George Andrie =

American football player (1940–2018)

No. 66
- Position: Defensive end

Personal information
- Born: April 20, 1940; Grand Rapids, Michigan, U.S.
- Died: August 21, 2018 (aged 78); Woodway, Texas, U.S.
- Listed height: 6 ft 6 in (1.98 m)
- Listed weight: 250 lb (113 kg)

Career information
- High school: Catholic Central (Grand Rapids)
- College: Marquette (1958–1960)
- NFL draft: 1962: 6th round, 82nd overall pick
- AFL draft: 1962: 12th round, 96th overall pick

Career history
- Dallas Cowboys (1962–1972)

Awards and highlights
- Super Bowl champion (VI); First-team All-Pro (1969); 3× Second-team All-Pro (1966–1968); 5× Pro Bowl (1965–1969); NFL sacks leader (1966)

Career NFL statistics
- Games played: 141
- Fumble recoveries: 13
- Safeties: 1
- Interceptions: 1
- Stats at Pro Football Reference

George Joseph Andrie (April 20, 1940 – August 21, 2018) was an American professional football defensive end in the National Football League (NFL) for the Dallas Cowboys. Prior to his NFL career he played college football at Marquette University, which dropped its program after his junior season.

== Early life ==
Born and raised in Grand Rapids, Michigan, Andrie graduated from Catholic Central High School in 1958. He chose to play football across Lake Michigan at Marquette, where his older brother Stan had played on the line in the early 1950s. The Marquette football team was historically known as the "Golden Avalanche", as well as the other Marquette nicknames of Hilltoppers and Warriors.

During his sophomore and junior seasons (1959, 1960), he led Marquette in receiving both years from his slotback position. As a two-way player, he was also ranked among the team's tackle leaders, registering over 80 tackles as a defensive lineman. After a 3–6 season in 1960 under head coach Lisle Blackbourn, the university dropped the football program in December, citing financial issues.

After the school limited his scholarship to just the tuition fees, he explored an opportunity to transfer to Tulsa in 1961, but decided to return to Marquette, soon after visiting the school's campus. Unsure of his future at the professional level, he focused on academics and worked on his physical conditioning during his senior year.

In 1991, he was inducted into the Marquette Athletics Hall of Fame.

== Professional career ==
Idle in his senior season, he was off the radar of most pro teams, except for the Dallas Cowboys, who had just completed their second season in 1961 with a 4–9–1 record. Their player personnel director was Gil Brandt, who was born and raised in Milwaukee and was a Wisconsin alumnus. They selected Andrie in the sixth round (82nd overall) of the 1962 NFL draft as a defensive end. In his first season, he won the starting job at right defensive end (replacing Nate Borden) and also made the NFL All-Rookie team.

In 1964, after playing on the left side of the defense, he was switched back to his original position at right defensive end, where he stayed throughout his career. He played most of his career next to future Hall of Fame defensive tackle Bob Lilly. Together they helped to form the Cowboys' original "Doomsday Defense".

In the frigid 1967 NFL Championship Game against the Green Bay Packers, often referred to as the Ice Bowl, he picked up a Bart Starr fumble and ran it in for a touchdown, scoring six of the Cowboys' 17 points in the loss. In 1970, he competed in Super Bowl V in Miami, the first after the merger with the American Football League. The Cowboys faced the Baltimore Colts, but lost 16–13 in a game remembered for the record eleven turnovers (both teams), as well as ten penalties committed by the Cowboys. Andrie knocked out Colts quarterback Johnny Unitas with a shoulder tackle in the second quarter. The next year in the second quarter of the NFC championship game against San Francisco, he intercepted a John Brodie screen pass near the 49ers' 10-yard line and advanced it to the two, setting up the game's first score (the winning touchdown by running back Calvin Hill). Two weeks later in New Orleans, the Cowboys defeated the Miami Dolphins 24–3 in Super Bowl VI.

The NFL didn't recognize quarterback sacks as an official stat until 1982; however, the Cowboys have their own records, dating back before the 1982 season. According to the Cowboys' stats, Andrie is unofficially credited with a total of 97 sacks, leading the Cowboys in sacks each year from 1964 to 1967, with a high of 18.5 in 1966. Andrie also had eight straight games with a sack from 1966 to 1967, making it the fourth longest such streak in club history. He ranks fifth on the team's All-time sack leaders list.

Andrie played defensive end for the Cowboys for 11 seasons, registering 112 straight regular-season starts and only two missed games in his career, with a dislocated elbow in 1963. He was named to the Pro Bowl five straight times (1965–1969), All-Pro once and three times second-team All-Pro during his career. He was also named the Pro Bowl MVP in 1970, after a temporary retirement in training camp due to a $2,000 salary dispute.

== Personal life ==
Andrie worked with Cowboy teammate Lilly in a beer distribution business in Waco, before founding a promotional products company in 1979.

Andrie has seven children with his wife, Mary Lou. Andrie was first diagnosed with dementia in 2014, and despite two claims filed in the 2017 NFL concussion settlement, those claims have been both denied, and his family is appealing both. Andrie's efforts in navigating the settlement has highlighted the complicated nature of the claims process in the settlement.

In August 2018, Andrie died at age 78 at his home in Woodway, Texas, and was buried at Oakwood Cemetery in Waco. He was one of at least 345 NFL players to be diagnosed after death with chronic traumatic encephalopathy (CTE), caused by repeated hits to the head.
