= Jerry Gross (American football) =

Profile
- Position: Quarterback

Personal information
- Born: c. 1940; Bay City, Michigan, U.S.
- Listed height: 5 ft 10 in (1.78 m)
- Listed weight: 172 lb (78 kg)

Career information
- High school: Bay City Central (MI)
- College: Detroit (1960–1962)

Career history
- Cleveland Browns (1963)*
- * Offseason or practice squad member only

Awards and highlights
- Catholic All-America Player of the Year (1961); Michigan Amateur Athlete of the Year (1962)

Jerry Gross (born c. 1940) is a former American football quarterback. He played college football for the Detroit Titans from 1960 to 1962. He ranked among the leading passers in major-college football for three consecutive years and was selected as the Catholic All-America Player of the Year in 1961 and as the Michigan Amateur Athlete of the Year in 1962.

== Early life ==
Gross's father died when he was five years old. Gross began working in the farm fields around Bay City in the summers starting when he was in the sixth grade. He also worked summers in a scrap iron yards, a grocery market, and on Great Lakes boats. He also attended Bay City Central High School where he played quarterback for the football team. He won first-team all-state honors in both his junior and senior seasons at Bay City Central. He completed 142 of 238 passes for 2,825 yards and 34 touchdowns in two years as Bay City Central's starting quarterback.

== University of Detroit ==
Gross enrolled at the University of Detroit in 1959 and set freshman passing records while playing for the freshman team.

As a sophomore in 1960, he became the Titans' starting quarterback. He led the 1960 Detroit Titans football team to a 7–2 record, completing 59 of 112 passes (52.7%) for 886 yards with six touchdowns, six interceptions, and a 126.1 passer rating. Gross also tallied 343 rushing yards in 1960 with an average of 5.8 yards per carry. His tally of 1,229 yards of total offense ranked 17th among major-college players. His principal receivers in 1960 were Steve Stonebreaker and Larry Vargo, both of whom went on to play in the National Football League.

As a junior in 1961, Gross ranked among the leading passers in college football. He was on pace to break the national recor for total offense, averaging 232.6 yards a game, but he broke his ankle in the sixth game of the season against Army. Despite the injury, he ranked among the leading major-college passers with 15.6 passing yards per completion (3rd), 1,126 passing yards (4th), 125.1 yards gained per game (4th), 7.4 yards per passing attempt (5th), a 114.7 passing efficiency rating (6th), and a 47.4 completion percentage (7th), and nine passing touchdowns (9th).

As a senior in 1962, Gross was again one of college football's leading passers, tallying 324 total plays (3rd), 212 pass attempts (3rd), 105 pass completions (6th), 146.3 yards of total offense per game played (6th), 1,317 passing yards (8th), 1,721 yards of total offense (8th), a 52.3 completions percentage (16th). At the end of the 1962 season, his teammates unanimously selected Gross as the team's most valuable player.

Gross was selected as the Catholic All-America Player of the Year in 1961 and the Michigan Amateur Athlete of the Year in 1962. He also played in the Senior Bowl in 1963, completing 24 of 41 passes for 317 yards and three touchdowns and was selected as the game's most valuable player.

== Professional football ==
Despite his impressive college performance, Gross was not drafted, as NFL scounts concluded that "the day of the small quarterback" (Gross was 5'10", 172 pounds) was over. Gross ultimately signed as a free agent with the Cleveland Browns in 1963, but he was cut in late July.

== Later life ==
Gross later worked as an insurance adjuster at Saginaw Metal Casting. He was inducted into the University of Detroit Titans Hall of Fame in 1980. He was also inducted into the Michigan Sports Hall of Fame.
