= 1960 Sun Bowl =

American college football game

Utah State Aggies	New Mexico State Aggies
(9–1)	(10–0)
Mountain States	Border Conference
13	20
Head coach: John Ralston	Head coach: Warren B. Woodson
	AP / Coaches; 17 / 18
	1	2	3	4	Total
Utah State	7	6	0	0	13
New Mexico State	0	7	13	0	20
- Date: December 31, 1960
- Season: 1960
- Stadium: Kidd Field
- Location: El Paso, Texas
- Attendance: 16,000–16,200

The 1960 Sun Bowl featured the New Mexico State Aggies and the Utah State Aggies. This was the 27th Sun Bowl (26th held between college teams), and was played at Kidd Field in El Paso, Texas.

== Background ==
This was the year to shine for teams named Aggies. New Mexico State had a 14-game winning streak and were ranked in the AP Poll for the first time ever while also being champions of the BIAA once again. This was their third Sun Bowl as they looked to be the first team to win consecutive Sun Bowls since the Texas Western Miners did it in 1954 and 1955. One notable player for New Mexico State was Bob Gaiters, who had 197 carries for 1,338 yards and 23 touchdowns, a record for New Mexico State that still stands today. Quarterback Charley Johnson was no slouch, either. He threw 109-of-199 for 1,511 yards, with 13 touchdowns and 6 interceptions.

The Utah State Aggies were co-champions of the Skyline Conference with Wyoming. Utah State won their first nine games of the season, beating opponents such as conference opponents New Mexico, Colorado State, BYU, and Wyoming. For two weeks, they were even ranked (#18 and #19, from 10/31 to 11/7). In their final game of the year, they were shut out 6-0 by Utah, but they were still champion of the conference. This was their first conference championship since winning the Big Seven Conference title in 1946. This was their first bowl game since 1947.

== Game summary ==
- Utah State - Larscheid 13 yd run (Miller kick)
- New Mexico State - Atkins 2 yd pass from Johnson (Atkins kick)
- Utah State - Camilli 11 yd run (Miller kick failed)
- New Mexico State - Gaithers 32 yd run (Atkins kick)
- New Mexico State - Sims 7 yd pass from Johnson (Atkins kick failed)

Charley Johnson won his second MVP by throwing two touchdowns for New Mexico State, who had trailed at halftime 13–7 due to Tom Larscheid and Dolph Camilli both having touchdown runs for Utah State. But Bob Gaiters had a touchdown run and Johnson threw his second touchdown pass as Utah State's Doug Mayberry was stopped short on fourth down late in the game, sealing the win for New Mexico State for their first (and so far only) perfect season. Johnson threw 18-of-26 for 190 yards and two touchdowns in an MVP effort.

== Statistics ==
Statistics	New Mexico State	Utah State
First downs	18	15
Yards rushing	44	268
Yards passing	190	0
Total yards	234	268
Punts-Average	3-37.3	4-52.0
Fumbles-Lost	1-1	2-1
Penalties-Yards	2-16	4-52

== Aftermath ==
New Mexico State did not reach another bowl game for 57 years, which was the longest period of any FBS team without a bowl appearance. New Mexico State went 35–23–2 during the rest of Woodson's tenure before he was fired in 1967. Since then, the Aggies have won only the Missouri Valley Conference championship in 1976 and 1978. Gaiters and Johnson were named to the Sun Bowl Association 75th Anniversary Team in 2008. On February 14, 2009 (Valentine's Day), the 1960 football team was inducted into the First Community Bank/NMSU Athletics Hall of Fame. In 2017, the Aggies were invited to the Arizona Bowl. Their opponent for the game is Utah State.

Utah State went to the Gotham Bowl the following year. It took them 32 years to reach another bowl game.
