= 1960 Tulsa Golden Hurricane football team =

American college football season

1960 Tulsa Golden Hurricane football
- Conference: Missouri Valley Conference
- Record: 5–5 (2–1 MVC)
- Head coach: Bobby Dobbs (6th season)
- Home stadium: Skelly Stadium

1960 Missouri Valley Conference football standings
	Conf.					Overall
Team	W		L		T	W		L		T
Wichita $	3	–	0	–	0	8	–	2	–	0
Tulsa	2	–	1	–	0	5	–	5	–	0
Cincinnati	1	–	2	–	0	4	–	6	–	0
North Texas State	0	–	3	–	0	2	–	6	–	1
$ – Conference champion

The 1960 Tulsa Golden Hurricane football team represented the University of Tulsa during the 1960 college football season. In their sixth year under head coach Bobby Dodds, the Golden Hurricane compiled a 5–5 record (2–1 against Missouri Valley Conference opponents) and finished in second place in the conference. The team's statistical leaders included Jerry Keeling with 1,018 passing yards, David White with 444 rushing yards, and Jim Furlong with 209 receiving yards.

== Schedule ==
Date	Opponent	Site	Result	Attendance	Source
September 17	New Mexico State*	Skelly Stadium; Tulsa, OK	L 18–38	17,278	
September 24	at Arkansas*	Razorback Stadium; Fayetteville, AR	L 7–48	25,000	
October 1	Hardin–Simmons*	Skelly Stadium; Tulsa, OK	W 21–7	11,611	
October 8	Oklahoma State*	Skelly Stadium; Tulsa, OK (rivalry)	L 7–28	16,238	
October 15	at Arizona*	Arizona Stadium; Tucson, AZ	W 17–16	23,500	
October 22	at Cincinnati	Nippert Stadium; Cincinnati, OH	W 34–3	12,000	
October 29	at Georgia*	Sanford Stadium; Athens, GA	L 7–45	31,000	
November 5	Wichita^{†}	Skelly Stadium; Tulsa, OK	L 20–21	11,226	
November 12	North Texas State	Skelly Stadium; Tulsa, OK	W 12–8	9,112	
November 26	at Houston*	Rice Stadium; Houston, TX	W 26–16	7,000	
*Non-conference game; ^{†}Homecoming; Source:

== After the season ==
=== 1961 NFL draft ===
The following Golden Hurricane player was selected in the 1961 NFL draft following the season.

Round	Pick	Player	Position	NFL club
19	259	Joe Novsek	Defensive end	Baltimore Colts

=== 1961 AFL draft ===
The following Golden Hurricane players were selected in the 1961 American Football League draft following the season.

Round	Pick	Player	Position	AFL club
17	131	Joe Novsek	Defensive end	Oakland Raiders
25	200	Jack Kreider	Halfback	Houston Oilers
