= 1960 Arizona Wildcats football team =

American college football season

1960 Arizona Wildcats football
- Conference: Border Conference
- Record: 7–3 (3–0 Border)
- Head coach: Jim LaRue (2nd season)
- Home stadium: Arizona Stadium

1960 Border Conference football standings
	Conf.					Overall
Team	W		L		T	W		L		T
No. 17 New Mexico State $	4	–	0	–	0	11	–	0	–	0
Arizona	3	–	0	–	0	7	–	3	–	0
Arizona State	3	–	2	–	0	7	–	3	–	0
Texas Western	2	–	3	–	0	4	–	5	–	1
West Texas State	1	–	4	–	0	3	–	7	–	0
Hardin–Simmons	0	–	4	–	0	0	–	10	–	0
Rankings from AP Poll

The 1960 Arizona Wildcats football team represented the University of Arizona in the Border Conference during the 1960 college football season. In their second season under head coach Jim LaRue, the Wildcats compiled a 7–3 record and outscored their opponents, 233 to 152. The team captain was Tony Matz. The team played its home games in Arizona Stadium in Tucson, Arizona.

The team's statistical leaders included Eddie Wilson with 1,020 passing yards, Bobby Thompson with 732 rushing yards, and Joe Hernandez with 442 receiving yards.

== Schedule ==
Date	Opponent	Site	Result	Attendance	Source
September 24	Utah*	Arizona Stadium; Tucson, AZ	L 3–13	24,600	
October 1	Wyoming*	Arizona Stadium; Tucson, AZ	W 21–19	20,000	
October 8	at Colorado*	Folsom Field; Boulder, CO	L 16–35	34,153	
October 15	Tulsa*	Arizona Stadium; Tucson, AZ	L 16–17	23,500	
October 22	at New Mexico*	University Stadium; Albuquerque, NM (rivalry)	W 26–14	14,247	
October 29	West Texas State	Arizona Stadium; Tucson, AZ	W 21–14	24,000	
November 5	Idaho*	Arizona Stadium; Tucson, AZ	W 32–3	17,200	
November 12	at Texas Western	Kidd Field; El Paso, TX	W 28–14	10,500	
November 19	Kansas State*	Arizona Stadium; Tucson, AZ	W 35–16	21,000–25,793	
November 26	Arizona State	Arizona Stadium; Tucson, AZ (rivalry)	W 35–7	25,500	
*Non-conference game
