= Frank Jackunas =

American football player (born 1940)

No. 54
- Position: Center

Personal information
- Born: October 5, 1940 (age 86); Detroit, Michigan, U.S.
- Listed height: 6 ft 3 in (1.91 m)
- Listed weight: 225 lb (102 kg)

Career information
- High school: Assumption (Windsor, Ontario, Canada)
- College: Detroit
- NFL draft: 1961: 12th round, 159th overall pick
- AFL draft: 1961: 24th round, 188th overall pick

Career history
- Buffalo Bills (1962); Denver Broncos (1963)*
- * Offseason or practice squad member only

Career AFL statistics
- Games played: 3
- Stats at Pro Football Reference

Frank Raymond Jackunas (born October 5, 1940) is an American former professional football player who was a center for one season with the Buffalo Bills of the American Football League (AFL). He played college football for the Detroit Titans, and was selected by the Bills in the 24th round of the 1961 AFL draft. He was also a member of the Denver Broncos.

== Early life ==
Frank Raymond Jackunas was born on October 5, 1940, in Detroit, Michigan. He played high school football at Assumption High School in Windsor, Ontario, Canada. He earned All-City honors in 1957.

== College career ==
Jackunas was a member of the Detroit Titans of the University of Detroit from 1959 to 1961. The 1960 Titans had a 7–2 record, which was the most wins in school history by a post-World War II team (the school's' last season of football was in 1964). The 1960 team was inducted into the Detroit Mercy Titans Hall of Fame in 2001. Jackunas was co-captain of the 1961 team.

== Professional career ==
Jackunas was a future draft pick of the Pittsburgh Steelers in the 12th round, with the 159th overall pick, of the 1961 NFL draft. He was also a future pick of the Buffalo Bills in the 24th round, with the 188th overall pick, of the 1961 AFL draft. He signed with the Bills on December 18, 1961. He spent the majority of the 1962 season on the team's taxi squad but was promoted to the active roster on November 21 after Al Bemiller suffered an injury. Jackunas then played in three games for the Bills that season. Jackunas wore jersey number 54 with the Bills and was listed as a center. He stood six foot, three inches and weighed 225 pounds. On July 3, 1963, it was reported that Jackunas had re-signed with the Bills.

On August 27, 1963, Jackunas was traded to the Denver Broncos for a draft pick. He was released on September 3, 1963.
