= 1960 San Jose State Spartans football team =

American college football season

1960 San Jose State Spartans football
- Conference: Independent
- Record: 5–4
- Head coach: Bob Titchenal (4th season)
- Home stadium: Spartan Stadium

1960 Western major college football independents records
	Conf.			Overall
Team	W	L	T	W		L		T
Oregon		–		7	–	3	–	1
Oregon State		–		6	–	3	–	1
San Jose State		–		5	–	4	–	0
Washington State		–		4	–	5	–	1
Air Force		–		4	–	6	–	0
Pacific (CA)		–		4	–	6	–	0
Idaho		–		1	–	9	–	0

The 1960 San Jose State Spartans football team represented San Jose State College—now known as San Jose State University—as an independent during the 1960 college football season. Led by fourth-year head coach Bob Titchenal, the Spartans compiled a record of 5–4 and were outscored by opponents 176 to 175. The team played home games at Spartan Stadium in San Jose, California.

== Schedule ==
Date	Opponent	Site	Result	Attendance	Source
September 23	BYU	Spartan Stadium; San Jose, CA	W 21–8	12,000–13,000	
October 8	at Oregon	Hayward Field; Eugene, OR	L 0–33	10,000	
October 15	at Stanford	Stanford Stadium; Stanford, CA (rivalry)	W 34–20	33,000	
October 22	at Arizona State	Sun Devil Stadium; Tempe, AZ	W 12–7	30,000–30,600	
October 29	Washington State	Spartan Stadium; San Jose, CA	L 6–29	19,500	
November 5	at Pacific (CA)	Pacific Memorial Stadium; Stockton, CA (Victory Bell)	L 20–26	15,000	
November 11	Fresno State	Spartan Stadium; San Jose, CA (rivalry)	L 12–27	9,000	
November 18	Idaho	Spartan Stadium; San Jose, CA	W 22–20	7,000	
December 2	at Hawaii	Honolulu Stadium; Honolulu, HI (rivalry)	W 48–6	20,000–21,000	

== Team players in the NFL/AFL ==
The following San Jose State players were selected in the 1961 NFL draft.

Player	Position	Round	Overall	NFL team
Leon Donohue	Guard – Tackle	9	118	San Francisco 49ers
Mike Jones	Quarterback	20	271	Pittsburgh Steelers

The following San Jose State players were selected in the 1961 American Football League draft.

Player	Position	Round	Overall	NFL team
Mike Jones	Quarterback	21	164	Oakland Raiders
Clair Appledoorn	End	27	212	Oakland Raiders
