= 1960 Drake Bulldogs football team =

American college football season

1960 Drake Bulldogs football
- Conference: Independent
- Record: 4–5
- Head coach: Bus Mertes (1st season)
- Home stadium: Drake Stadium

1960 Midwestern non-major college football independents records
	Conf.			Overall
Team	W	L	T	W		L		T
Northern Michigan		–		8	–	1	–	1
Baldwin–Wallace		–		4	–	3	–	1
Carthage		–		5	–	4	–	0
St. Norbert		–		4	–	4	–	1
Drake		–		4	–	5	–	0
North Park		–		4	–	5	–	0
Washington University		–		2	–	7	–	0
Rose Poly		–		1	–	5	–	1
Wabash		–		1	–	8	–	0

The 1960 Drake Bulldogs football team was an American football team that represented Drake University as an independent during the 1960 college football season. In its first season under head coach Bus Mertes, the team compiled a 4–5 record and was outscored by a total of 169 to 86.

The team's statistical leaders included quarterback Ken Macke (199 passing yards), left halfback Art Nichols (448 yards, 130 receiving yards), and fullback Jim Evangelista (24 points scored).

The team played its home games at Drake Stadium in Des Moines, Iowa.

== Schedule ==
Date	Opponent	Site	Result	Attendance	Source
September 17	at Iowa State	Clyde Williams Field; Ames, IA	L 0–46	14,686-16,000	
September 23	Southeast Missouri State	Drake Stadium; Des Moines, IA	W 17–6	3,000	
October 1	at Iowa State Teachers	O. R. Latham Stadium; Cedar Falls, IA	L 3–14	6,500	
October 8	at Colorado State	Colorado Field; Fort Collins, CO	L 0–30	6,000	
October 14	Evansville	Drake Stadium; Des Moines, IA	W 14–0	3,000	
October 22	at North Texas State	Fouts Field; Denton, TX	L 7–29	2,000	
October 29	Bradley	Drake Stadium; Des Moines, IA	W 14–6	3,000	
November 5	Washington University	Drake Stadium; Des Moines, IA	W 21–6	2,500	
November 11	Wichita	Drake Stadium; Des Moines, IA	L 7–32	3,500	
