= 1960 Montana Grizzlies football team =

American college football season

1960 Montana Grizzlies football
- Conference: Skyline Conference
- Record: 5–5 (2–5 Skyline)
- Head coach: Ray Jenkins (3rd season)
- Home stadium: Dornblaser Field

1960 Skyline Conference football standings
	Conf.					Overall
Team	W		L		T	W		L		T
Utah State +	6	–	1	–	0	9	–	2	–	0
Wyoming +	6	–	1	–	0	8	–	2	–	0
Utah	5	–	1	–	0	7	–	3	–	0
New Mexico	4	–	2	–	0	5	–	5	–	0
Montana	2	–	5	–	0	5	–	5	–	0
BYU	2	–	5	–	0	3	–	8	–	0
Denver	1	–	6	–	0	3	–	7	–	0
Colorado State	1	–	6	–	0	2	–	8	–	0
+ – Conference co-champions

The 1960 Montana Grizzlies football team represented the University of Montana in the 1960 college football season as a member of the Skyline Conference. The Grizzlies were led by third-year head coach Ray Jenkins, played their home games at Dornblaser Field, and finished the season with a record of five wins and five losses (5–5, 2–5 Skyline, fifth).

Montana won its two rivalry games, both played at home in Missoula. For the first time in a decade, the Grizzlies defeated Idaho to recapture the Little Brown Stein, then broke a four-game losing streak to Montana State.

== Schedule ==
Date	Opponent	Site	Result	Attendance	Source
September 10	at North Dakota*	Memorial Stadium; Grand Forks, ND	W 21–14	4,879	
September 17	vs. Wyoming	Daylis Stadium; Billings, MT	L 0–14	7,000	
September 24	Utah State	Dornblaser Field; Missoula, MT	L 12–14	4,870	
October 1	Idaho*^{†}	Dornblaser Field; Missoula, MT (Little Brown Stein)	W 18–14	10,200	
October 15	at Denver	DU Stadium; Denver, CO	W 26–12	7,223	
October 22	BYU	Dornblaser Field; Missoula, MT	L 6–7	4,500	
October 29	at Colorado State	Colorado Field; Fort Collins, CO	W 26–14	2,800	
November 5	Montana State*	Dornblaser Field; Missoula, MT (rivalry)	W 10–6	8,000	
November 12	at Utah	Ute Stadium; Salt Lake City, UT	L 6–16	10,742	
November 19	at New Mexico	University Stadium; Albuquerque, NM	L 7–24	14,516	
*Non-conference game; ^{†}Homecoming

== After the season ==
The following Grizzly was selected in the 1960 NFL draft after the season.

Round	Pick	Player	Position	NFL club
18	247	John Gregor	Tackle	Detroit Lions
