= 1960 Dayton Flyers football team =

American college football season

1960 Dayton Flyers football
- Conference: Independent
- Record: 1–9
- Head coach: Stan Zajdel (1st season)
- Home stadium: UD Stadium

1960 Midwestern major college football independents records
	Conf.			Overall
Team	W	L	T	W		L		T
Detroit		–		7	–	2	–	0
Xavier		–		5	–	5	–	0
Marquette		–		3	–	6	–	0
Notre Dame		–		2	–	8	–	0
Dayton		–		1	–	9	–	0

The 1960 Dayton Flyers football team represented the University of Dayton as an independent during the 1960 college football season. In their first season under head coach Stan Zajdel, the Flyers compiled a 1–9 record. Dayton played their home games at UD Stadium in Dayton, Ohio.

== Schedule ==
Date	Opponent	Site	Result	Attendance	Source
September 17	Ohio	UD Stadium; Dayton, OH	L 0–28	13,502	
September 24	at Cincinnati	Nippert Stadium; Cincinnati, OH	L 21–27	18,000	
October 1	Villanova	UD Stadium; Dayton, OH	W 14–0	11,000	
October 8	at Xavier	Xavier Stadium; Cincinnati, OH	L 12–18	8,210	
October 15	Louisville	UD Stadium; Dayton, OH	L 0–36	13,000	
October 22	at Detroit	University of Detroit Stadium; Detroit, MI	L 0–13	14,320	
October 29	at Wichita	Veterans Field; Wichita, KS	L 6–7	5,992	
November 5	at Holy Cross	Fitton Field; Worcester, MA	L 6–36	5,000	
November 12	at Miami (OH)	Miami Field; Oxford, OH	L 8–23	10,000	
November 19	Kent State	UD Stadium; Dayton, OH	L 7–14	5,500	
