= 1960 Utah Utes football team =

American college football season

1960 Utah Utes football
- Conference: Skyline Conference
- Record: 7–3 (5–1 Skyline)
- Head coach: Ray Nagel (3rd season)
- Home stadium: Ute Stadium

1960 Skyline Conference football standings
| | Conf. | | | | | Overall |
| Team | W | | L | | T | W | | L | | T |
|---|---|---|---|---|---|---|---|---|---|---|
| Utah State + | 6 | – | 1 | – | 0 | 9 | – | 2 | – | 0 |
| Wyoming + | 6 | – | 1 | – | 0 | 8 | – | 2 | – | 0 |
| Utah | 5 | – | 1 | – | 0 | 7 | – | 3 | – | 0 |
| New Mexico | 4 | – | 2 | – | 0 | 5 | – | 5 | – | 0 |
| Montana | 2 | – | 5 | – | 0 | 5 | – | 5 | – | 0 |
| BYU | 2 | – | 5 | – | 0 | 3 | – | 8 | – | 0 |
| Denver | 1 | – | 6 | – | 0 | 3 | – | 7 | – | 0 |
| Colorado State | 1 | – | 6 | – | 0 | 2 | – | 8 | – | 0 |
+ – Conference co-champions

The 1960 Utah Utes football team, or also commonly known as the Utah Redskins, was an American football team that represented the University of Utah as a member of the Skyline Conference during the 1960 college football season. In their third season under head coach Ray Nagel, the Utes compiled an overall record of 7–3 with a mark of 5–1 against conference opponents, placing third in the Skyline. Home games were played on campus at Ute Stadium in Salt Lake City.

Utah was led on the field by senior quarterback Terry Nofsinger.

Conference foe New Mexico was not played in 1960, so Utah finished a half game behind co-champions Utah State and Wyoming in the standings. The Utes denied the undefeated Aggies an outright title and a perfect regular season with a 6–0 shutout in the conference finale on November 19 in Salt Lake City. For the second straight year, Utah did not face longtime rival Colorado; the teams met in 1961 and 1962, then the series went on hiatus until 2011, when both schools joined the Pac-12 Conference.

== Schedule ==
| Date | Opponent | Site | Result | Attendance | Source |
|---|---|---|---|---|---|
| September 17 | Hawaii* | Ute Stadium; Salt Lake City, UT | W 33–6 | 16,160 | |
| September 24 | at Arizona* | Arizona Stadium; Tucson, AZ | W 13–3 | 24,600 | |
| October 1 | Oregon* | Ute Stadium; Salt Lake City, UT | L 17–20 | 23,653 | |
| October 7 | at BYU^{Δ} | Ute Stadium; Salt Lake City, UT (rivalry) | W 17–0 | 21,079 | |
| October 22 | Denver^{†} | Ute Stadium; Salt Lake City, UT | W 49–16 | | |
| October 29 | at Wyoming | War Memorial Stadium; Laramie, WY | L 7–17 | 14,000 | |
| November 5 | at Colorado State | Colorado Field; Fort Collins, CO | W 27–6 | 3,500 | |
| November 12 | Montana | Ute Stadium; Salt Lake City, UT | W 16–6 | 10,742 | |
| November 19 | Utah State | Ute Stadium; Salt Lake City, UT (rivalry) | W 6–0 | 29,261 | |
| November 26 | UCLA* | Ute Stadium; Salt Lake City, UT | L 9–16 | 17,099 | |
*Non-conference game; ^{†}Homecoming; ^{Δ} BYU was designated home team.

== NFL draft ==
Utah had two players selected in the 1961 NFL draft.

| Player | Position | Round | Pick | NFL team |
| Ken Petersen | Guard | 14 | 183 | Minnesota Vikings |
| Terry Nofsinger | Quarterback | 17 | 230 | Pittsburgh Steelers |
