= 1960 Arizona State Sun Devils football team =

American college football season

1960 Arizona State Sun Devils football
- Conference: Border Conference
- Record: 7–3 (3–2 Border)
- Head coach: Frank Kush (3rd season)
- Home stadium: Sun Devil Stadium

1960 Border Conference football standings
	Conf.					Overall
Team	W		L		T	W		L		T
No. 17 New Mexico State $	4	–	0	–	0	11	–	0	–	0
Arizona	3	–	0	–	0	7	–	3	–	0
Arizona State	3	–	2	–	0	7	–	3	–	0
Texas Western	2	–	3	–	0	4	–	5	–	1
West Texas State	1	–	4	–	0	3	–	7	–	0
Hardin–Simmons	0	–	4	–	0	0	–	10	–	0
Rankings from AP Poll

The 1960 Arizona State Sun Devils football team was an American football team that represented Arizona State University in the Border Conference during the 1960 college football season. In their third season under head coach Frank Kush, the Sun Devils compiled a 7–3 record (3–2 against Border opponents) and outscored their opponents by a combined total of 223 to 120.

The team's statistical leaders included Ron Cosner with 422 passing yards, Nolan Jones with 582 rushing yards, and Bob Rembert with 178 receiving yards.

== Schedule ==
Date	Time	Opponent	Rank	Site	Result	Attendance	Source
September 17		Colorado State*		Sun Devil Stadium; Tempe, AZ	W 39–0	28,000	
September 24	6:30 p.m.	at West Texas State		Buffalo Bowl; Canyon, TX	W 14–3	8,000–9,000	
October 1		Washington State*		Sun Devil Stadium; Tempe, AZ	W 24–21	29,600	
October 8		at Hardin–Simmons		Public Schools Stadium; Abilene, TX	W 28–0	6,500	
October 15		at BYU*	No. 18	Cougar Stadium; Provo, UT	W 31–0	8,890	
October 22		San Jose State*		Sun Devil Stadium; Tempe, AZ	L 7–12	30,000	
October 29		No. 18 New Mexico State		Sun Devil Stadium; Tempe, AZ	L 24–27	28,300	
November 5		Texas Western^{†}		Sun Devil Stadium; Tempe, AZ	W 24–0	23,300–23,600	
November 12		NC State*		Sun Devil Stadium; Tempe, AZ	W 25–22	27,400	
November 26		at Arizona		Arizona Stadium; Tucson, AZ (rivalry)	L 7–35	25,500	
*Non-conference game; ^{†}Homecoming; Rankings from Coaches' Poll released prior to the game; All times are in Mountain time
