= 1960 Xavier Musketeers football team =

American college football season

1960 Xavier Musketeers football
- Conference: Independent
- Record: 5–5
- Head coach: Ed Doherty (2nd season)
- Home stadium: Xavier Stadium

1960 Midwestern major college football independents records
	Conf.			Overall
Team	W	L	T	W		L		T
Detroit		–		7	–	2	–	0
Xavier		–		5	–	5	–	0
Marquette		–		3	–	6	–	0
Notre Dame		–		2	–	8	–	0
Dayton		–		1	–	9	–	0

The 1960 Xavier Musketeers football team was an American football team that represented Xavier University as an independent during the 1960 college football season. In their second year under head coach Ed Doherty, the Musketeers compiled a 5–5 record.

== Schedule ==
Date	Opponent	Site	Result	Attendance	Source
September 17	Miami (OH)	Xavier Stadium; Cincinnati, OH	W 17–6	9,300	
September 24	Wichita	Veterans Field; Wichita, KS	L 13–20	8,571	
October 1	Detroit	Xavier Stadium; Cincinnati, OH	L 6–26	6,450	
October 8	Dayton	Xavier Stadium; Cincinnati, OH	W 18–12	8,210	
October 15	Ohio	Xavier Stadium; Cincinnati, OH	L 0–6	9,200–9,234	
October 21	Quantico Marines	Xavier Stadium; Cincinnati, OH	W 28–20		
October 29	at Cincinnati	Nippert Stadium; Cincinnati, OH (rivalry)	W 5–0	26,000	
November 5	at Louisville	Fairgrounds Stadium; Louisville, KY	W 29–0	6,500–6,823	
November 12	at Kentucky	McLean Stadium; Lexington, KY	L 0–49	20,000–21,000	
November 19	at Villanova	Villanova Stadium; Villanova, PA	L 7–21	5,600–5,635	
