= Gotham Bowl =

Postseason college football game

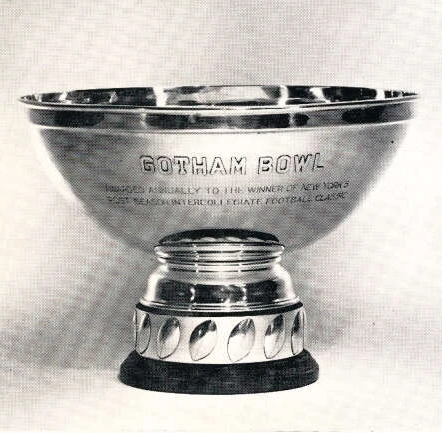
The trophy for the 1961 game

The Gotham Bowl was a post-season college football bowl game that was played in New York City, in 1961 and 1962. The game was initially created as a fund-raising attempt for the March of Dimes.

The game was not a success financially: the two games that were played both lost money as few fans were willing to sit through the frigid December New York weather. Additionally, as it was essentially a charity game, it had little financial capital on which it could survive.

== Game results ==
Date	Winner		Loser		Location	Notes
December 1960	Oregon State was invited to play, but no opponent was found.					
December 9, 1961	Baylor	24	#10 Utah State	9	Polo Grounds, New York, New York	notes
December 15, 1962	Nebraska	36	Miami (FL)	34	Yankee Stadium, The Bronx, New York	notes

=== 1960 ===
In what was supposed to be the game's inaugural year, the bowl hoped to invite Syracuse, but no invitation was extended when Syracuse announced immediately after its season ended that it would not accept any postseason offers. Organizers then invited Air Force, who insisted on playing Army since neither service academy played each other in the regular season; this plan fell through as well after Army rejected it. The bowl eventually extended an offer to Oregon State. Holy Cross and Colorado turned down invitations after bowl officials mishandled the invitation process, leaving Oregon State with no opponent and forcing the bowl to postpone for another year.

=== 1961 ===
	1	2	3	4	Total
Baylor	7	3	7	7	24
#10 Utah State	0	0	3	6	9

The following year, the Gotham Bowl managed to find two teams to play, Baylor and Utah State, for the game at the Polo Grounds. Baylor won 24–9 in front of a sparse crowd of 15,123. (It was the penultimate college football game played at the Polo Grounds; Army defeated Syracuse 9–2 in front of 29,500 on September 29, 1962.)

=== 1962 ===
	1	2	3	4	Total
Nebraska	6	14	8	8	36
Miami (FL)	6	14	7	7	34

The 1962 edition of the Gotham Bowl, played in Yankee Stadium, was particularly tormented with poor planning and bad luck. The Miami Hurricanes (with a 7–3 record) were invited, but no opponent could be found. Finally, on December 4, 1962, just eleven days before the game, the Gotham Bowl invited Nebraska, which had just finished an 8–2 season under first-year head coach Bob Devaney. However, the day before the contest, the pilot of the Cornhuskers' team plane refused to leave the Lincoln airport until the bowl's check for expenditures cleared, which it did. (Miami made a similar demand and received their $30,000 expense check up front.)

In addition, the 1962–63 New York City newspaper strike began on December 8 and showed little sign of resolution, all but assuring that the Gotham Bowl would receive virtually no coverage in its own city. The contest was, however, aired on national television by ABC's Wide World of Sports.

The weather did not cooperate, either. A damp, 14 °F (−10 °C) day limited the official attendance to just 6,166 (plus 5,000 tickets given away). Perhaps a few thousand stalwarts were actually in the stands at kickoff.

The game itself was a thriller: Nebraska edged Miami 36–34, despite an MVP performance by Miami (and future professional) quarterback George Mira, who passed for 321 yards and a pair of touchdowns. It was the Cornhuskers' first trip to the Big Apple in four decades, after beating Rutgers at the Polo Grounds 28–0 in 1920. Nebraska has not played a game in New York City proper since, although they have played in suburban New Jersey in the now-defunct Kickoff Classic (in 1983, 1988 and 1994) and in Big Ten Conference games at Rutgers (in 2015 and 2020). For the Hurricanes, it was only their second trip to New York, having lost to Fordham at the Polo Grounds in 1953; they would not return to NYC until 2018, when they lost to Wisconsin in the Pinstripe Bowl.

The poor attendance ensured the 1962 Gotham Bowl would be the last one played.

== See also ==
- Pinstripe Bowl
- List of college bowl games

== Sources ==
- Fitzgerald, Francis and Tagge, Jerry. Devaney--A Dynasty Remembered (1994). New York; Athlon.
