= 1960 Hardin–Simmons Cowboys football team =

American college football season

1960 Hardin–Simmons Cowboys football
- Conference: Border Conference
- Record: 0–10 (0–4 Border)
- Head coach: Howard McChesney (1st season)
- Home stadium: Public Schools Stadium

1960 Border Conference football standings
	Conf.					Overall
Team	W		L		T	W		L		T
No. 17 New Mexico State $	4	–	0	–	0	11	–	0	–	0
Arizona	3	–	0	–	0	7	–	3	–	0
Arizona State	3	–	2	–	0	7	–	3	–	0
Texas Western	2	–	3	–	0	4	–	5	–	1
West Texas State	1	–	4	–	0	3	–	7	–	0
Hardin–Simmons	0	–	4	–	0	0	–	10	–	0
Rankings from AP Poll

The 1960 Hardin–Simmons Cowboys football team was an American football team that represented Hardin–Simmons University in the Border Conference during the 1960 college football season. In its first season under head coach Howard McChesney, the team compiled a 0–10 record (0–4 against conference opponents), finished in last place in the conference, and was outscored by a total of 308 to 68.

No Hardin-Simmons players were named to the 1960 All-Border Conference football team.

== Schedule ==
Date	Opponent	Site	Result	Attendance	Source
September 17	at Cincinnati*	Nippert Stadium; Cincinnati, OH	L 14–15	13,000	
September 23	at Mississippi Southern*	Ladd Stadium; Mobile, AL	L 0–27	8,112	
October 1	at Tulsa*	Skelly Stadium; Tulsa, OK	L 7–21	11,611	
October 8	Arizona State	Public Schools Stadium; Abilene, TX	L 0–28	6,500	
October 15	at Memphis State*	Crump Stadium; Memphis, TN	L 7–42	15,218	
October 22	West Texas State	Public Schools Stadium; Abilene, TX	L 0–21	6,700	
October 29	at Texas Western	Kidd Field; El Paso, TX	L 6–45	10,000	
November 5	at North Texas State*	Fouts Field; Denton, TX	L 19–26	14,000	
November 12	at Trinity (TX)*	Alamo Stadium; San Antonio, TX	L 12–43	2,600	
November 19	No. 14 New Mexico State	Public Schools Stadium; Abilene, TX	L 3–40	4,000	
*Non-conference game; Rankings from AP Poll released prior to the game
