= 1960 BYU Cougars football team =

American college football season

1960 BYU Cougars football
- Conference: Skyline Conference
- Record: 3–8 (2–5 Skyline)
- Head coach: Tally Stevens (2nd season)
- Home stadium: Cougar Stadium

1960 Skyline Conference football standings
	Conf.					Overall
Team	W		L		T	W		L		T
Utah State +	6	–	1	–	0	9	–	2	–	0
Wyoming +	6	–	1	–	0	8	–	2	–	0
Utah	5	–	1	–	0	7	–	3	–	0
New Mexico	4	–	2	–	0	5	–	5	–	0
Montana	2	–	5	–	0	5	–	5	–	0
BYU	2	–	5	–	0	3	–	8	–	0
Denver	1	–	6	–	0	3	–	7	–	0
Colorado State	1	–	6	–	0	2	–	8	–	0
+ – Conference co-champions

The 1960 BYU Cougars football team represented Brigham Young University (BYU) as a member of the Skyline Conference during the 1960 college football season. In their second and final season under head coach Tally Stevens, the Cougars compiled an overall record of 3–8 record with a mark of 2–5 against conference opponents, tied for fifth place in the Skyline, and were outscored by all opponents by a combined total of 207 to 102.

The team's statistical leaders included Bud Belnap with 285 passing yards and Jack Gifford with 254 rushing yards, 138 receiving yards, and 18 points scored.

== Schedule ==
Date	Opponent	Site	Result	Attendance	Source
September 16	Cal Poly*	Cougar Stadium; Provo, UT	W 34–14	4,426–6,000	
September 23	at San Jose State*	Spartan Stadium; San Jose, CA	L 8–21	12,000–13,000	
October 1	at Colorado State	Colorado Field; Fort Collins, CO	L 7–8		
October 7	Utah^{Δ}	Ute Stadium; Salt Lake City, UT (Holy War)	L 0–17	21,079	
October 15	No. 18 Arizona State*^{†}	Cougar Stadium; Provo, UT	L 0–31	8,890	
October 22	at Montana	Dornblaser Field; Missoula, MT	W 7–6	4,500	
October 29	at Utah State	Romney Stadium; Logan, UT (rivalry)	L 0–34	10,183	
November 5	New Mexico	Cougar Stadium; Provo, UT	L 15–27		
November 12	at Denver	DU Stadium; Denver, CO	W 19–6	3,775	
November 19	Wyoming	Cougar Stadium; Provo, UT	L 6–30	6,313	
November 25	at Hawaii*	Honolulu Stadium; Honolulu, HI	L 6–13	10,000	
*Non-conference game; ^{†}Homecoming; ^{Δ} BYU was designated home team.; Rankings from AP Poll released prior to the game
