= 1960 North Texas State Eagles football team =

American college football season

1960 North Texas State Eagles football
- Conference: Missouri Valley Conference
- Record: 2–6–1 (0–3 MVC)
- Head coach: Odus Mitchell (15th season)
- Home stadium: Fouts Field

1960 Missouri Valley Conference football standings
	Conf.					Overall
Team	W		L		T	W		L		T
Wichita $	3	–	0	–	0	8	–	2	–	0
Tulsa	2	–	1	–	0	5	–	5	–	0
Cincinnati	1	–	2	–	0	4	–	6	–	0
North Texas State	0	–	3	–	0	2	–	6	–	1
$ – Conference champion

The 1960 North Texas State Eagles football team was an American football team that represented North Texas State College (now known as the University of North Texas) during the 1960 college football season as a member of the Missouri Valley Conference. In their 15th year under head coach Odus Mitchell, the team compiled a 2–6–1 record.

== Schedule ==
Date	Opponent	Site	Result	Attendance	Source
September 24	Texas Western*	Fouts Field; Denton, TX	T 16–16	8,000	
October 1	Cincinnati	Fouts Field; Denton, TX	L 0–21	6,000	
October 8	Memphis State*	Fouts Field; Denton, TX	L 0–44	4,000	
October 15	at West Texas State*	Buffalo Bowl; Canyon, TX	L 6–14	2,000	
October 22	Drake*	Fouts Field; Denton, TX	W 29–7	2,000	
October 29	Houston*	Fouts Field; Denton, TX	L 16–41	2,000	
November 5	Hardin–Simmons*^{†}	Fouts Field; Denton, TX	W 26–19	14,000	
November 12	at Tulsa	Skelly Field; Tulsa, OK	L 8–12	9,112	
November 19	at Wichita	Veterans Field; Wichita, KS	L 6–34	10,454	
*Non-conference game; ^{†}Homecoming
