= Moses Gray (American football) =

American football player (1937–2023)

No. 64, 73, 52
- Position: Tackle

Personal information
- Born: April 12, 1937; Goochland County, Virginia, U.S.
- Died: February 6, 2023 (aged 85)
- Listed height: 6 ft 3 in (1.91 m)
- Listed weight: 260 lb (118 kg)

Career information
- High school: East Conemaugh (PA)
- College: Indiana
- NFL draft: 1961: 9th round, 123rd overall pick
- AFL draft: 1961: 27th round, 214th overall pick

Career history
- New York Titans (1961)*; Indianapolis Warriors (1961); New York Titans (1961–1962); Indianapolis Warriors (1962)
- * Offseason or practice squad member only

Career AFL statistics
- Games played: 5
- Games started: 2
- Stats at Pro Football Reference

Moses William Gray (April 12, 1937 – February 6, 2023) was an American football player, civic leader, and community activist. A tackle, he played college football for the Indiana Hoosiers and later appeared in five games for the New York Titans of the American Football League (AFL).

== Early life and education ==
Gray was born on April 12, 1937, in Goochland County, Virginia. Born to Moses Gray Jr., a steel worker, and Ida Gray, a housewife, he was the fourth of seven children and grew up in Conemaugh, Pennsylvania. He attended East Conemaugh High School, earning all-scholastic honors from The Tribune-Democrat while playing football. From 1957 to 1960, Gray attended Indiana University Bloomington, playing three years on the varsity football team as a tackle. As a junior, he averaged 18 minutes played per game as a backup; he was a starter as a senior. He graduated with a Bachelor of Science degree in physical education.

== Professional career ==
Gray was selected in both the 1961 NFL draft by the New York Giants (9th round, 123rd overall) and the 1961 AFL draft by the New York Titans (27th round, 214th overall). He opted to play with the Titans, signing in late July. He was released at the final roster cuts at the start of September, and afterwards was sent to the Indianapolis Warriors of the United Football League (UFL). He posted two interceptions with the Warriors. Gray was re-signed by the Titans prior to their game against the Dallas Texans on December 3, and made three total appearances for them.

During the New York training camp in 1962, Gray received praise from head coach Bulldog Turner. He made the team and appeared in two games, both as a starter, before being released and rejoining the Warriors. He helped them compile a 9–3 record and make the playoffs, where they lost to the Grand Rapids Blazers. Gray scored one touchdown on the season. He retired due to a knee injury. He ended his AFL career with five games played, two as a starter.

== Community service and honors ==
Gray had additional education at the University of Michigan and at General Motors Institute. After retiring from professional football, he was an active civic leader and community activist. He was also for many years an employee at General Motors. He started in 1962 as an inspector and soon after became a tool and die maker apprentice. He was appointed journeyman tool and die maker in 1967, and one year after was made production supervisor. He was the supervisor of the tool room from 1969 to 1973, and was the general supervisor from 1973 to 1976. Gray was named Superintendent in the Master Mechanic Area in 1976, and served in that role through 1979, before becoming Director of Community Relations. He was in 1983 named Manager, Manufacturing Service Speedway Plants, a position he served in through 1990. He received the position of General Superintendent of Manufacturing Speedway plants in January 1990, which placed him in charge of 1,400 employees; he served through 1992 as this before retiring.

Gray was a member of many different organizations and served with numerous committees and boards. Among his roles: various capacities with the Indianapolis Children's Bureau; president and board member of the Association for the Rights of Children of Indiana; Black Adoption Committee of Indianapolis member; and assistant District Commissioner of Crossroads of America Council. He also was a member of the Marion County Department of Public Welfare Foster Parents Program, served with United Way, and additionally participated in the Marten Manor Group Home Foster Aunt and Uncle Program. Additionally, he was affiliated with the Indianapolis Urban League, Indiana Vocational Technical College, NAACP, the local volunteer bureau, the Child Welfare League of America, and his community's service council. Gray was the chairman for the fund telethon of the United Negro College, and served with the boards of the Indiana Black Expo, WFYI television station, Madame Walker Urban Life Center, Office of Equal Opportunity (Indianapolis), and the Opportunities Industrialization Center.

Gray was an active member of the Wilma Rudolph Foundation, which gave training to prepare youth for national and above level sports events; it also taught the importance of education. He taught young blacks to improve their education, and was the national secretary of 100 Black Men of America for eight years, additionally serving as the president/secretary of the local chapter for a period of nine years. He led efforts for the adoption of black children, becoming in 1972, the state's Council of Adoptable Children president, as well as the following year being named the president for the Black Adoption Committee. He was the first president of the Indiana Association for the Rights of Children, and worked with many adoption organizations, including the Homes for Black Children (HBC).

Gray's work in the black adoption areas were such that the Moses William Gray award was named in his honor, given by the HBC and Children's Bureau to those who show outstanding work in black adoption efforts. He received numerous awards and honors for his community service. He was named the B'nai B'rith Man of the Year in 1974, and four years later was given a gold medal for winning the General Motors Award for Excellence in Community Service. Gray was included in seven editions of Who's Who in the Midwest, and several versions of Who's Who Among Black Americans.

In 1990, Gray was given the Chivas Regal Extraprenuer Award. He was given the Z. G. Clevenger Award in 1995, the National Black Police Officers Community Service Award in 2015, the Indiana University Distinguished Alumni Service Award in 2016, and the Indiana University Bicentennial Medal in 2019. The 100 Black Men of America named their Midwest district in his honor, and annually give out the Moses Gray Man of the Year Award. He was given the Indianapolis Centurion Award in 2022, and the 100 Black Men of America association established a scholarship bearing his name.

Gray was also active in the Indiana University community; he served as a chairman for the school's Neal–Marshall Black Culture Center, chaired its fundraising committee, and was a member of the "I" Association. He was inducted into the Cambria County Sports Hall of Fame in 2006.

== Personal life and death ==
Gray was married to Anne Marie Powell in 1962 and adopted two children with her. He died on February 6, 2023, at the age of 85, after a lengthy illness.
