= 1960 Detroit Titans football team =

American college football season

1960 Detroit Titans football
- Conference: Independent
- Record: 7–2
- Head coach: Jim Miller (2nd season)
- Home stadium: University of Detroit Stadium

1960 Midwestern major college football independents records
	Conf.			Overall
Team	W	L	T	W		L		T
Detroit		–		7	–	2	–	0
Xavier		–		5	–	5	–	0
Marquette		–		3	–	6	–	0
Notre Dame		–		2	–	8	–	0
Dayton		–		1	–	9	–	0

The 1960 Detroit Titans football team represented the University of Detroit as an independent during the 1960 college football season. Detroit outscored its opponents by a combined total of 181 to 136 and finished with a 7–2 record in its second year under head coach Jim Miller.

After losing the season opener to Iowa State, the Titans won seven games in a row, including victories over Cincinnati (14–0), Boston College (19–17), Marquette (32–12), and Villanova (13–7). The season ended with a 43–15 loss to Michigan State in East Lansing.

The team's statistical leaders included Jerry Gross with 886 passing yards and 343 rushing yards, Steve Stonebreaker with 416 receiving yards, and Ted Karpowicz with 30 points scored.

Four players from the 1960 team, Steve Stonebreaker, Larry Vargo, Jim Shorter, and Frank Jackunas went on to play in the National Football League (NFL). In 2001, the 1960 Titans football team was inducted as a group into the Detroit Titans Hall of Fame.

== Schedule ==
Date	Opponent	Site	Result	Attendance	Source
September 23	Iowa State	University of Detroit Stadium; Detroit, MI	L 21–44	14,609	
October 1	at Xavier	Xavier Stadium; Cincinnati, OH	W 26–6	6,450	
October 7	Cincinnati	University of Detroit Stadium; Detroit, MI	W 14–0	15,745	
October 15	at Boston College	Alumni Stadium; Chestnut Hill, MA	W 19–17	13,000	
October 22	Dayton	University of Detroit Stadium; Detroit, MI	W 13–0	14,320	
October 28	Quantico Marines	University of Detroit Stadium; Detroit, MI	W 28–7	13,836	
November 4	Marquette	University of Detroit Stadium; Detroit, MI	W 32–12	12,256	
November 12	at Villanova	Villanova Stadium; Villanova, PA	W 13–7	5,300	
November 19	at No. 12 Michigan State	Spartan Stadium; East Lansing, MI	L 15–43	49,102	
Rankings from Coaches' Poll released prior to the game

== Players ==
- Fred Abele, end, 180 pounds, 6–1, Detroit
- Billy Allen, halfback, 175 pounds, 5–10, Altoona, Pennsylvania
- Tony Asher, guard, 205 pounds, 5–10, Detroit
- Vic Battani, fullback, 205 pounds, 5–8, Detroit
- Jim Cain, tackle, 223 pounds, 6–4, Toronto, Ontario
- Paul Christ, guard, 190 pounds, 6–0, St. Louis, Missouri
- Tom DeLuca, fullback, 205 pounds, 5–9, Akron, Ohio
- Jerry Gross, quarterback, 168 pounds, 5–10, Bay City, Michigan
- Tony Hanley, quarterback, 153 pounds, 5–9, Sunnyvale, California
- Frank Jackunas, center, 215 pounds, 6–3, Baldwin, Michigan
- Ted Karpowicz, halfback, 185 pounds, 6–0, Hamtramck, Michigan
- Dave Loner, halfback, 185 pounds, 6-1/2, Southfield, Michigan
- Bob Lusky, quarterback, 185 pounds, 6–0, Tamaqua, Pennsylvania
- Tom Marshall, end, 190 pounds, 6–0, Lewes, Delaware
- Jim Post, halfback, 185 pounds, 5–10, Coldwater, Michigan
- Tom Shanahan, halfback, 170 pounds, 5–10, Chicago
- Jim Shorter, halfback, 172 pounds, 5–10, Pontiac, Michigan
- Steve Stonebreaker, end, 200 pounds, 6–3, Detroit
- Joe Trapp, tackle, 220 pounds, 6–2, Scardsdale, New York
- Larry Vargo, end 200 pounds, 6–3, Detroit
