= 1960 New Mexico Lobos football team =

American college football season

1960 New Mexico Lobos football
- Conference: Skyline Conference
- Record: 5–5 (4–2 Skyline)
- Head coach: Bill Weeks (1st season)
- Home stadium: University Stadium

1960 Skyline Conference football standings
	Conf.					Overall
Team	W		L		T	W		L		T
Utah State +	6	–	1	–	0	9	–	2	–	0
Wyoming +	6	–	1	–	0	8	–	2	–	0
Utah	5	–	1	–	0	7	–	3	–	0
New Mexico	4	–	2	–	0	5	–	5	–	0
Montana	2	–	5	–	0	5	–	5	–	0
BYU	2	–	5	–	0	3	–	8	–	0
Denver	1	–	6	–	0	3	–	7	–	0
Colorado State	1	–	6	–	0	2	–	8	–	0
+ – Conference co-champions

The 1960 New Mexico Lobos football team represented the University of New Mexico in the Skyline Conference during the 1960 college football season. In their first season under head coach Bill Weeks, the Lobos compiled a 5–5 record (4–2 against Skyline opponents), finished fourth in the conference, and outscored all opponents by a total of 234 to 182.

The 1960 season was the first in which the Lobos played their home games in the newly-constructed University Stadium. The first game in the new stadium was a 77–6 victory over University of Mexico witnessed by a record crowd of 24,085 persons.

The team's statistical leaders included Jim Cromartie with 343 passing yards and Bobby Santiago with 596 rushing yards and 187 receiving yards.

== Schedule ==
Date	Opponent	Site	Result	Attendance	Source
September 17	University of Mexico*	University Stadium; Albuquerque, NM	W 77–6	24,085	
September 24	at Wyoming	War Memorial Stadium; Laramie, WY	L 3–13	13,065	
October 1	at Texas Western*	Kidd Field; El Paso, TX	L 17–23	12,000–13,000	
October 8	New Mexico State*	University Stadium; Albuquerque, NM (rivalry)	L 0–34	26,673–27,606	
October 15	Utah State	University Stadium; Albuquerque, NM	L 7–46	9,486	
October 22	Arizona*	University Stadium; Albuquerque, NM (rivalry)	L 14–26	14,247	
October 28	at Denver	DU Stadium; Denver, CO	W 41–6	4,237	
November 5	at BYU	Cougar Stadium; Provo, UT	W 27–15		
November 12	Colorado State	University Stadium; Albuquerque, NM	W 24–6	17,219	
November 19	Montana^{†}	University Stadium; Albuquerque, NM	W 24–7	14,516	
*Non-conference game; ^{†}Homecoming
