= Marquette Golden Avalanche football =

Intercollegiate American football team

- First season: 1892; 134 years ago
- Last season: 1960; 66 years ago
- Location: Milwaukee, Wisconsin, U.S.
- Stadium: Marquette Stadium; Milwaukee County Stadium (capacity: 24,000/43,768)
- Colors: Blue and gold
- All-time record: 349–280–39 (.552)
- Bowl record: 0–1 (.000)

National championships
- Claimed: 0

For information on all Marquette University sports, see Marquette Golden Eagles

The Marquette Golden Avalanche football program, commonly known as the Marquette Hilltoppers from approximately 1940 to 1953 and as the Marquette Warriors from 1954 to 1960, was the intercollegiate American football team for Marquette University of Milwaukee, Wisconsin. The first team was fielded in 1892.

In December 1960, Marquette discontinued intercollegiate football, citing the financial hardships imposed by a program that lost $50,000 in the preceding year. Lisle Blackbourn was the head coach for the program's final two seasons, and previously led it from 1950 through 1953.

== History ==
The 1936 Golden Avalanche had a 7–1 regular season record with a top 20 ranking. They were invited to the first Cotton Bowl Classic in January 1937 in Dallas, against Texas Christian University of nearby Fort Worth. The Horned Frogs were led by quarterback Sammy Baugh and TCU won by ten points, 16–6, in Marquette's only bowl appearance.

After a winless season in 1956, most of the home games (7 of 9) in 1957 and 1958 were moved from Marquette Stadium to the larger County Stadium, and attendance fell. The 1957 game against Penn State at County Stadium drew fewer than 4,800 to the final home game on November 9, as the losing streak reached 18 games.

== Notable former players ==
- George Andrie – defensive end, Dallas Cowboys (1962–1972)
- Ray Apolskis – lineman, Chicago Cardinals (1941–1942, 1945–1950)
- Wayland Becker – end, Chicago Bears (1934), Brooklyn Dodgers (1934–1935), Green Bay Packers (1936–1938), Pittsburgh Pirates (1939)
- Tom Braatz – end / linebacker, Washington Redskins (1957–1958), Los Angeles Rams (1958), Green Bay Packers (1959), Washington Redskins (1959), Dallas Cowboys (1960–1961)
- Art Bultman, center, Brooklyn Dodgers (1931), Green Bay Packers (1932–1934)
- Ward Cuff – halfback, New York Giants (1937–1945), Chicago Cardinals (1946), Green Bay Packers (1947)
- Frank Deig – fullback (1928–1931)
- LaVern Dilweg – end, Green Bay Packers (1927–1934), also Milwaukee Badgers (1926); attorney and U.S. Congressman (1943–1945)
- Ron Drzewiecki – halfback, Chicago Bears (1955, 1957)
- Red Dunn – back, Milwaukee Badgers (1924), Chicago Cardinals (1925–1926), Green Bay Packers (1927–1931)
- Earl Evans – lineman, Chicago Cardinals (1925), Chicago Bears (1926–1929)
- Swede Johnston – back, Green Bay Packers (1931), Chicago Cardinals (1933), Cincinnati Reds (1934), St. Louis Gunners (1934), Green Bay Packers (1934–1938), Pittsburgh Pirates (1939), Pittsburgh Steelers (1940)
- Thomas A. Manning – attorney and Wisconsin State Assemblyman (1912–1914)
- Jab Murray – lineman, Green Bay Packers (1921–1924)
- Fritz Roeseler – end, Racine Legion (1922–1924), Milwaukee Badgers (1925)
- Gene Ronzani – back, Chicago Bears, (1933–1938, 1944–1945); second head coach of Green Bay Packers (1950–1953)
- Carl Schuette – linebacker, Buffalo Bills (1948–1949), Green Bay Packers (1950–1951)
- Johnny Sisk – back, Chicago Bears (1932–1936)
- Johnny Strzykalski – halfback, San Francisco 49ers (1946–1952)
- Milt Trost – tackle / end, Chicago Bears (1935–1939), Philadelphia Eagles (1940)
- Whitey Woodin – guard, Racine Legion (1922), Green Bay Packers (1922–1931)

== Head coaching records ==
Tenure	Head coach	Years	Record	Pct.	Bowls
1892–06, 1912–16	Unknown	20
1907	Cody Clark	1	6–0–0	1.000
1908–11	William Juneau	4	19–5–6	.733
1917–21	John J. Ryan	5	28–5–5	.803
1922–36, 1946–49	Frank Murray	19	104–55–6	.648	1
1937–40	Paddy Driscoll	4	10–23–1	.309
1941–45	Thomas E. Stidham	5	20–22–2	.477
1950–53, 1959–60	Lisle Blackbourn	6	24–30–4	.448
1954–55	Frosty Ferzacca	2	5–11–2	.333
1956–58	John F. Druze	3	2–26–1	.086

== Bowl game appearances ==
Season	Date	Bowl	W/L	Opponent	PF	PA	Coach	Notes
1936	January 1, 1937	Cotton Bowl	L	TCU	6	16	Frank Murray	notes
