= Bob Minihane =

American gridiron football player (1938–2020)

Profile
- Position: Tackle

Personal information
- Born: March 9, 1938; Boston, Massachusetts, U.S.
- Died: April 30, 2020 (aged 82); Osterville, Massachusetts, U.S.
- Listed height: 6 ft 3 in (1.91 m)
- Listed weight: 255 lb (116 kg)

Career information
- College: Boston University
- AFL draft: 1961: 25th round, 194th overall pick

Career history
- 1961–1963: Hamilton Tiger-Cats
- 1964–1968: Montreal Alouettes

Awards and highlights
- Grey Cup champion (1963)

Robert Patrick Minihane (March 9, 1938 – March 30, 2020) was an American professional football player who played for the Hamilton Tiger-Cats and Montreal Alouettes. He won the Grey Cup with the Tiger-Cats in 1963. He played college football at the Boston University. He died of cancer in 2020.
