= 1960 West Texas State Buffaloes football team =

American college football season

1960 West Texas State Buffaloes football
- Conference: Border Conference
- Record: 3–7 (1–4 Border)
- Head coach: Joe Kerbel (1st season)
- Home stadium: Buffalo Bowl

1960 Border Conference football standings
	Conf.					Overall
Team	W		L		T	W		L		T
No. 17 New Mexico State $	4	–	0	–	0	11	–	0	–	0
Arizona	3	–	0	–	0	7	–	3	–	0
Arizona State	3	–	2	–	0	7	–	3	–	0
Texas Western	2	–	3	–	0	4	–	5	–	1
West Texas State	1	–	4	–	0	3	–	7	–	0
Hardin–Simmons	0	–	4	–	0	0	–	10	–	0
Rankings from AP Poll

The 1960 West Texas State Buffaloes football team represented West Texas State College—now known as West Texas A&M University—as a member of the Border Conference during the 1960 college football season. Led by first-year head coach Joe Kerbel, the Buffaloes compiled an overall record of 3–7 with a mark of 1–4 in conference play, placing fifth in the Border Conference. West Texas State played home games at the Buffalo Bowl in Canyon, Texas.

== Schedule ==
Date	Time	Opponent	Site	Result	Attendance	Source
September 17		at Texas Tech*	Jones Stadium; Lubbock, TX	L 13–38	30,000	
September 24	7:30 p.m.	Arizona State	Buffalo Bowl; Canyon, TX	L 3–14	8,000–9,000	
October 1		at Mississippi Southern*	Faulkner Field; Hattiesburg, MS	L 18–28	12,600	
October 8		Texas Western	Buffalo Bowl; Canyon, TX	L 3–6	11,000	
October 15		North Texas State*	Buffalo Bowl; Canyon, TX	W 14–6	2,000	
October 22		Hardin–Simmons	Buffalo Bowl; Canyon, TX	W 21–0	6,700	
October 29		at Arizona	Arizona Stadium; Tucson, AZ	L 14–21	24,000	
November 5	2:00 p.m.	Trinity (TX)*^{†}	Buffalo Bowl; Canyon, TX	W 28–0	8,000–9,000	
November 12		No. 15 New Mexico A&M	Buffalo Bowl; Canyon, TX	L 15–35	9,000	
November 24	2:00 p.m.	at Wichita*	Veterans Field; Wichita, KS	L 14–31	6,751–6,900	
*Non-conference game; ^{†}Homecoming; Rankings from AP Poll released prior to the game; All times are in Central time
