= 1960 Louisville Cardinals football team =

American college football season

1960 Louisville Cardinals football
- Conference: Independent
- Record: 7–2
- Head coach: Frank Camp (15th season)
- Home stadium: Fairgrounds Stadium

1960 Southern non-major college football independents records
	Conf.			Overall
Team	W	L	T	W		L		T
Washington and Lee		–		8	–	0	–	1
Arlington State		–		9	–	2	–	0
Howard (AL)		–		8	–	1	–	0
Louisville		–		7	–	2	–	0
Mississippi Southern		–		6	–	4	–	0
Sewanee		–		4	–	3	–	1
Abilene Christian		–		5	–	5	–	0
Chattanooga		–		5	–	5	–	0
Arkansas State		–		4	–	5	–	0
Tampa		–		2	–	7	–	1
Trinity (TX)		–		2	–	7	–	1

The 1960 Louisville Cardinals football team was an American football team that represented the University of Louisville as an independent during the 1960 college football season. In their 15th season under head coach Frank Camp, the Cardinals compiled a 7–2 record.

The team's statistical leaders included Ernie Green with 441 rushing yards and John Giles with 436 passing yards.

== Schedule ==
Date	Opponent	Site	Result	Attendance	Source
September 17	at Tennessee Tech	Cookeville, TN	L 7–21	4,500	
September 23	Eastern Kentucky	Fairgrounds Stadium; Louisville, KY	W 28–7	5,245	
September 30	Bradley	Cardinal Stadium; Louisville, KY	W 40–6	5,865	
October 7	Murray State	Fairgrounds Stadium; Louisville, KY	W 12–6	7,935	
October 15	at Dayton	UD Stadium; Dayton, OH	W 36–0	13,000	
October 21	Western Kentucky	Fairgrounds Stadium; Louisville, KY	W 44–0	4,428	
October 29	at Marshall	Fairfield Stadium; Huntington, WV	W 7–0	5,000	
November 5	Xavier	Fairgrounds Stadium; Louisville, KY	L 0–29	6,500–6,823	
November 11	Kent State	Fairgrounds Stadium; Louisville, KY	W 22–8	3,633	
