= 1960 Texas Western Miners football team =

American college football season

1960 Texas Western Miners football
- Conference: Border Conference
- Record: 4–5–1 (2–3 Border)
- Head coach: Ben Collins (4th season)
- Home stadium: Kidd Field

1960 Border Conference football standings
	Conf.					Overall
Team	W		L		T	W		L		T
No. 17 New Mexico State $	4	–	0	–	0	11	–	0	–	0
Arizona	3	–	0	–	0	7	–	3	–	0
Arizona State	3	–	2	–	0	7	–	3	–	0
Texas Western	2	–	3	–	0	4	–	5	–	1
West Texas State	1	–	4	–	0	3	–	7	–	0
Hardin–Simmons	0	–	4	–	0	0	–	10	–	0
Rankings from AP Poll

The 1960 Texas Western Miners football team was an American football team that represented Texas Western College (now known as University of Texas at El Paso) as a member of the Border Conference during the 1960 college football season. In its fourth season under head coach Ben Collins, the team compiled a 4–5–1 record (2–3 against Border Conference opponents), finished fourth in the conference, and was outscored by a total of 176 to 167.

== Schedule ==
Date	Opponent	Site	Result	Attendance	Source
September 17	Utah State*	Kidd Field; El Paso, TX	L 7–20	10,500–12,000	
September 24	at North Texas State*	Fouts Field; Denton, TX	T 16–16	8,000	
October 1	New Mexico*	Kidd Field; El Paso, TX	W 23–17	12,000–13,000	
October 8	at West Texas State	Buffalo Bowl; Canyon, TX	W 6–3	11,000	
October 15	Trinity (TX)*	Kidd Field; El Paso, TX	W 41–14	10,000	
October 29	Hardin–Simmons^{†}	Kidd Field; El Paso, TX	W 45–6	10,000	
November 5	at Arizona State	Sun Devil Stadium; Tempe, AZ	L 0–24	23,300–23,600	
November 12	Arizona	Kidd Field; El Paso, TX	L 14–28	10,500	
November 19	No. 8 (small) Bowling Green*	Kidd Field; El Paso, TX	L 0–21	8,000	
November 26	at No. 15 New Mexico State	Memorial Stadium; Las Cruces, NM (rivalry)	L 15–27	11,659	
*Non-conference game; ^{†}Homecoming; Rankings from AP Poll released prior to the game
