= 1960 Air Force Falcons football team =

American college football season

1960 Air Force Falcons football
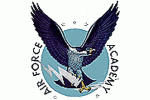
- Conference: Independent
- Record: 4–6
- Head coach: Ben Martin (3rd season season)
- Captain: Mike Quinlan
- Home stadium: DU Stadium

1960 Western major college football independents records
	Conf.			Overall
Team	W	L	T	W		L		T
Oregon		–		7	–	3	–	1
Oregon State		–		6	–	3	–	1
San Jose State		–		5	–	4	–	0
Washington State		–		4	–	5	–	1
Air Force		–		4	–	6	–	0
Pacific (CA)		–		4	–	6	–	0
Idaho		–		1	–	9	–	0

The 1960 Air Force Falcons football team season represented the United States Air Force Academy as an independent during the 1960 college football season. in third season head coach Ben Martin, the Falcons played their home games at DU Stadium in Denver, Colorado. They were outscored by their opponents 178–147 and finished with a record of 4 wins and 6 losses.

This was the first year the Falcons played Navy, a 35–3 loss in mid-October at Memorial Stadium in Baltimore. Heisman Trophy winner Joe Bellino scored three first half touchdowns and also had an interception. The two academies met in even-numbered years (except 1962 and 1964) through 1971, and have played annually in the competition (with Army) for the Commander-in-Chief's Trophy, first awarded in 1972.

== Schedule ==
Date	Opponent	Site	Result	Attendance	Source
September 24	Colorado State	DU Stadium; Denver, CO (rivalry)	W 32–8	16,471	
October 1	Stanford	DU Stadium; Denver, CO	W 32–9	20,194	
October 8	No. 11 Missouri	DU Stadium; Denver, CO	L 8–34	24,398	
October 15	vs. No. 5 Navy	Memorial Stadium; Baltimore, MD (rivalry)	L 3–35	50,000	
October 22	at Wyoming	War Memorial Stadium; Laramie, WY	L 0–15	21,217	
October 29	George Washington	DU Stadium; Denver, CO	L 6–20	8,792	
November 5	vs. Denver	DU Stadium; Denver, CO	W 36–6	10,094	
November 12	at No. 11 UCLA	Los Angeles Memorial Coliseum; Los Angeles, CA	L 0–22	21,914	
November 26	at Colorado	Folsom Field; Boulder, CO	W 16–6	39,000–39,140	
December 2	at Miami (FL)	Miami Orange Bowl; Miami, FL	L 14–23	29,678	
Rankings from AP Poll released prior to the game; Source:
