= 1960 Idaho Vandals football team =

American college football season

1960 Idaho Vandals football
- Conference: Independent
- Record: 1–9
- Head coach: Skip Stahley (7th season)
- Home stadium: Neale Stadium

1960 Western major college football independents records
	Conf.			Overall
Team	W	L	T	W		L		T
Oregon		–		7	–	3	–	1
Oregon State		–		6	–	3	–	1
San Jose State		–		5	–	4	–	0
Washington State		–		4	–	5	–	1
Air Force		–		4	–	6	–	0
Pacific (CA)		–		4	–	6	–	0
Idaho		–		1	–	9	–	0

The 1960 Idaho Vandals football team represented the University of Idaho in the 1960 college football season. Led by seventh-year head coach Skip Stahley, the Vandals were an independent in the NCAA's University Division and had a 1–9 record. Two home games were played on campus at Neale Stadium in Moscow, with one in Boise at Bronco Stadium at Boise Junior College.

The Vandals suffered a sixth straight loss in the Battle of the Palouse with neighbor Washington State, falling 7–18 at Neale Stadium in mid-November. In the rivalry game with Montana in Missoula, the Vandals lost the Little Brown Stein for the first time in a decade.

Since the disbanding of the Pacific Coast Conference in the spring of 1959, Idaho had just one win per season as an independent. Stahley took on the dual role of athletic director in July.

Idaho played ten games, with five scheduled at night, and their only win came at Hawaii. The game was scheduled for Friday night, but due to travel delays, it was played on Sunday afternoon. The Vandals stayed on Oahu until Thursday, then flew to California for their next game, against Pacific in Stockton on Saturday night.

== Schedule ==
Date	Time	Opponent	Site	Result	Attendance	Source
September 17	1:30 p.m.	at Oregon	Hayward Field; Eugene, OR	L 6–33	13,200	
September 24	2:00 p.m.	at No. 3 Washington	Husky Stadium; Seattle, WA	L 12–41	35,996	
October 1	1:00 p.m.	at Montana	Dornblaser Field; Missoula, MT (rivalry)	L 14–18	10,200	
October 8	7:00 p.m.	vs. Utah State	old Bronco Stadium; Boise, ID	L 6–33	8,500	
October 15	1:30 p.m.	No. 17 Oregon State^{†}	Neale Stadium; Moscow, ID	L 8–28	10,500	
October 23	4:00 p.m.	at Hawaii	Honolulu Stadium; Honolulu, HI	W 14–6	12,000	
October 29	8:00 p.m.	at Pacific (CA)	Pacific Memorial Stadium; Stockton, CA	L 14–25	7,000	
November 5	7:00 p.m.	at Arizona	Arizona Stadium; Tucson, AZ	L 3–32	17,200	
November 12	1:30 p.m.	Washington State	Neale Stadium; Moscow, ID (rivalry)	L 7–18	8,500	
November 18	8:00 p.m.	at San Jose State	Spartan Stadium; San Jose, CA	L 20–22	7,000	
^{†}Homecoming; Rankings from AP Poll released prior to the game; All times are in Pacific time; Source:

== Coaching staff ==
- Gary Kenworthy
- Bill Knuckles
- Bill Peterson
- Joe Berry

== All-Coast ==
No Vandals made the All-Coast team or the second team. Honorable mention were tight end Reggie Carolan and quarterback Sil Vial.

== NFL draft ==
One player, a fourth-year junior, from the 1960 Vandals was selected in the 1961 NFL draft:

Player	Position	Round	Overall	Franchise
Reggie Carolan ^	TE	8th	102	Los Angeles Rams

^ Carolan was granted another year of eligibility and played for Idaho in 1961.
