= 1960 Marquette Warriors football team =

American college football season

1960 Marquette Warriors football
- Conference: Independent
- Record: 3–6
- Head coach: Lisle Blackbourn (6th season)
- Home stadium: Marquette Stadium

1960 Midwestern major college football independents records
	Conf.			Overall
Team	W	L	T	W		L		T
Detroit		–		7	–	2	–	0
Xavier		–		5	–	5	–	0
Marquette		–		3	–	6	–	0
Notre Dame		–		2	–	8	–	0
Dayton		–		1	–	9	–	0

The 1960 Marquette Warriors football team was an American football team that represented Marquette University as an independent during the 1960 college football season. In its sixth season under head coach Lisle Blackbourn, the team compiled a 3–6 record and was outscored by a total of 202 to 101. The team played its home games at Marquette Stadium in Milwaukee.

On December 9, 1960, Marquette announced that, after 78 years of intercollegiate football at Marquette, the sport was being dropped. The university's president, Very Rev. Edward J. O'Donnell noted that the football program had lost $50,000 in the past year and that there was a "reasonable unwillingness to accept the financial hardships imposed by these two sports [football and track] in the light of the other needs of the university." The decision led to a protest by 3,000 students. Coach Lisle called the decision a "terrible mistake" and stated that he was not asked to sit in on any of the meetings and was surprised by the decision.

== Schedule ==
Date	Opponent	Site	Result	Attendance	Source
September 17	Villanova	Marquette Stadium; Milwaukee, WI	W 23–13	15,400	
September 24	at Pacific (CA)	Pacific Memorial Stadium; Stockton, CA	W 20–0	10,500	
October 1	at Wisconsin	Camp Randall Stadium; Madison, WI	L 6–35	51,553	
October 8	Boston College	Marquette Stadium; Milwaukee, WI	W 13–12	14,100	
October 15	at Indiana	Seventeenth Street Stadium; Bloomington, IN	L 8–34	26,123	
October 22	Vanderbilt^{†}	Marquette Stadium; Milwaukee, WI	L 6–23	17,100	
October 29	at Holy Cross	Fitton Field; Worcester, MA	L 0–20	8,000	
November 4	at Detroit	University of Detroit Stadium; Detroit, MI	L 12–32	12,256	
November 12	Cincinnati	Marquette Stadium; Milwaukee, WI	L 13–33	11,200	
^{†}Homecoming; Source:

== Notable players ==
- George Andrie, junior
