= 1960 Oregon State Beavers football team =

American college football season

1960 Oregon State Beavers football
- Conference: Independent
- Record: 6–3–1
- Head coach: Tommy Prothro (6th season)
- Home stadium: Parker Stadium; Multnomah Stadium

1960 Western major college football independents records
	Conf.			Overall
Team	W	L	T	W		L		T
Oregon		–		7	–	3	–	1
Oregon State		–		6	–	3	–	1
San Jose State		–		5	–	4	–	0
Washington State		–		4	–	5	–	1
Air Force		–		4	–	6	–	0
Pacific (CA)		–		4	–	6	–	0
Idaho		–		1	–	9	–	0

The 1960 Oregon State Beavers football team represented Oregon State College as an independent during the 1960 college football season. In their sixth season under head coach Tommy Prothro, the Beavers compiled a 6–3–1 record and outscored their opponents 197 to 145. They played two home games on campus at Parker Stadium in Corvallis and two at Multnomah Stadium in Portland.

The Pacific Coast Conference (PCC) disbanded in 1959; this was the second of five years that Oregon State and Oregon competed as independents. The Civil War game was played in Corvallis and ended in a tie.

The Gotham Bowl was scheduled to premiere at Yankee Stadium in New York City in 1960 with Holy Cross as the host team. However, after Oregon State was invited, Holy Cross was uninvited in hopes of finding a better match-up. The game was canceled when no opponent could be found for Oregon State.

After this season, the university's current title, Oregon State University, was adopted by a legislative act signed into law by Governor Mark Hatfield on March 6, 1961, and became effective that summer.

== Schedule ==
Date	Opponent	Rank	Site	Result	Attendance	Source
September 16	at No. 6 USC		Los Angeles Memorial Coliseum; Los Angeles, CA	W 14–0	32,928	
September 24	at No. 19 Iowa	No. 10	Iowa Stadium; Iowa City, IA	L 12–22	43,000	
October 1	Houston		Multnomah Stadium; Portland, OR	W 29–20	22,537	
October 8	at Indiana		Memorial Stadium; Bloomington, IN	W 20–6	23,594	
October 15	at Idaho	No. 17	Neale Stadium; Moscow, ID	W 28–8	10,500	
October 22	No. 8 Washington	No. 18	Multnomah Stadium; Portland, OR	L 29–30	36,833	
October 29	California	No. 15	Parker Stadium; Corvallis, OR	L 6–14	14,835	
November 4	at Washington State		Rogers Field; Pullman, WA	W 20–10	15,600	
November 12	at Stanford		Stanford Stadium; Stanford, CA	W 25–21	7,500	
November 19	No. 19 Oregon		Parker Stadium; Corvallis, OR (Civil War)	T 14–14	27,009	
Rankings from AP Poll released prior to the game; Source:

== Roster ==
- HB Terry Baker, So.
- HB Rich Brooks, So.
- HB Art Gilmore Sr.
- QB Marne Palmateer Jr.
- T Neil Plumley Jr.
- QB Bill Sullivan
- E Aaron Thomas Sr.

== Professional football drafts ==
=== NFL draft ===
Player	Position	Round	Pick	NFL club
Aaron Thomas	End	4	47	San Francisco 49ers
Art Gilmore	Back	7	86	Dallas Cowboys

=== AFL draft ===
Player	Position	Round	Pick	AFL Club
Art Gilmore	Back	11	85	New York Titans
Neil Plumley	Tackle	20	157	New York Titans
