= 1960 Florida State Seminoles football team =

American college football season

1960 Florida State Seminoles football
- Conference: Independent
- Record: 3–6–1
- Head coach: Bill Peterson (1st season)
- Captain: Tony Romeo
- Home stadium: Doak Campbell Stadium

1960 Southern major college football independents records
	Conf.			Overall
Team	W	L	T	W		L		T
No. 4 Navy		–		9	–	2	–	0
Memphis State		–		8	–	2	–	0
Houston		–		6	–	4	–	0
Miami (FL)		–		6	–	4	–	0
Florida State		–		3	–	6	–	1
Rankings from AP poll

The 1960 Florida State Seminoles football team represented Florida State University as an independent during the 1960 college football season. In 1960, Bill Peterson became head coach, and he coached 11 seasons, and compiled a 62–42–11 record.

== Schedule ==
Date	Opponent	Site	Result	Attendance	Source
September 17	Richmond	Doak Campbell Stadium; Tallahassee, FL	W 28–0	17,000	
September 24	at Florida	Florida Field; Gainesville, FL (rivalry)	L 0–3	38,000	
October 1	Wake Forest	Doak Campbell Stadium; Tallahassee, FL	W 14–6	19,100	
October 8	at The Citadel	Johnson Hagood Stadium; Charleston, SC	T 0–0	12,000	
October 15	at Mississippi Southern	Ladd Stadium; Mobile, AL	L 13–15	6,000	
October 22	William & Mary	Doak Campbell Stadium; Tallahassee, FL	W 22–0	13,400	
October 29	Kentucky	Doak Campbell Stadium; Tallahassee, FL	L 0–23	19,200	
November 4	at Miami (FL)	Miami Orange Bowl; Miami, FL (rivalry)	L 7–25	37,984	
November 12	Houston	Doak Campbell Stadium; Tallahassee, FL	L 6–7	10,400	
November 19	at No. 9 Auburn	Cliff Hare Stadium; Auburn, AL	L 21–57	20,000	
Rankings from AP Poll released prior to the game; Source:
