= 1960 Wyoming Cowboys football team =

American college football season

1960 Wyoming Cowboys football

Skyline co-champion
- Conference: Skyline Conference
- Record: 8–2 (6–1 Skyline)
- Head coach: Bob Devaney (4th season)
- Captain: Mark Smolinski
- Home stadium: War Memorial Stadium

1960 Skyline Conference football standings
	Conf.					Overall
Team	W		L		T	W		L		T
Utah State +	6	–	1	–	0	9	–	2	–	0
Wyoming +	6	–	1	–	0	8	–	2	–	0
Utah	5	–	1	–	0	7	–	3	–	0
New Mexico	4	–	2	–	0	5	–	5	–	0
Montana	2	–	5	–	0	5	–	5	–	0
BYU	2	–	5	–	0	3	–	8	–	0
Denver	1	–	6	–	0	3	–	7	–	0
Colorado State	1	–	6	–	0	2	–	8	–	0
+ – Conference co-champions

The 1960 Wyoming Cowboys football team was an American football team that represented the University of Wyoming as a member of the 1960 college football season. The Cowboys offense scored 212 points while the defense allowed 71 points. In their fourth year under head coach Bob Devaney, the Cowboys compiled an 8-2 record (6-1 against Skyline opponents) and finished as co-champions of the Skyline Conference. Running back Jerry Hill, in his final season, finished his collegiate career with 1,374 rushing yards on 288 carries.

== Schedule ==
Date	Opponent	Site	Result	Attendance	Source
September 17	vs. Montana	Daylis Stadium; Billings, MT	W 14–0	7,000	
September 24	New Mexico	War Memorial Stadium; Laramie, WY	W 13–3	13,065	
October 1	at Arizona*	Arizona Stadium; Tucson, AZ	L 19–21	20,000	
October 8	Denver	War Memorial Stadium; Laramie, WY	W 41–2	12,030–12,039	
October 15	at Colorado State	Colorado Field; Fort Collins, CO (rivalry)	W 40–8	12,500	
October 22	Air Force*	War Memorial Stadium; Laramie, WY	W 15–0	21,217	
October 29	Utah	War Memorial Stadium; Laramie, WY	W 17–7	14,000	
November 5	at No. T–18 Utah State	Romney Stadium; Logan, UT (rivalry)	L 13–17	11,425	
November 12	at Texas Tech*	Jones Stadium; Lubbock, TX	W 10–7	20,000	
November 19	at BYU	Cougar Stadium; Provo, UT	W 30–6	6,313	
*Non-conference game; Rankings from AP Poll released prior to the game

== Awards and honors ==
- Jerry Hill, All-Skyline Conference Running Back

== Team players in the NFL ==
The following were selected in the 1961 NFL draft.

Player	Position	Round	Overall	NFL team
Jerry Hill	Running back	3	35	Baltimore Colts
Chuck Lamson	Running back	4	43	Minnesota Vikings
Don Klacking	Running back	8	203	Philadelphia Eagles
Mike Davenport	Running back	17	428	St. Louis Cardinals
