= 1960 Houston Cougars football team =

American college football season

1960 Houston Cougars football
- Conference: Independent
- Record: 6–4
- Head coach: Hal Lahar (4th season)
- Captains: Wiley Feagin; Jim Kuehne; Jim Windham
- Home stadium: Rice Stadium

1960 Southern major college football independents records
| | Conf. | | | Overall |
| Team | W | L | T | W | | L | | T |
|---|---|---|---|---|---|---|---|---|
| No. 4 Navy | | – | | 9 | – | 2 | – | 0 |
| Memphis State | | – | | 8 | – | 2 | – | 0 |
| Houston | | – | | 6 | – | 4 | – | 0 |
| Miami (FL) | | – | | 6 | – | 4 | – | 0 |
| Florida State | | – | | 3 | – | 6 | – | 1 |
Rankings from AP poll

The 1960 Houston Cougars football team was an American football team that represented the University of Houston as an independent during the 1960 college football season. In its fourth season under head coach Hal Lahar, the team compiled a 6–4 record. Wiley Feagin, Jim Kuehne, and Jim Windham were the team captains. The team played its home games at Rice Stadium in Houston.

== Schedule ==
| Date | Opponent | Site | Result | Attendance | Source |
|---|---|---|---|---|---|
| September 17 | No. 2 Ole Miss | Rice Stadium; Houston, TX | L 0–42 | 45,000 | |
| September 24 | at Mississippi State | Scott Field; Starkville, MS | W 14–10 | 14,000 | |
| October 1 | at Oregon State | Multnomah Stadium; Portland, OR | L 20–29 | 22,537 | |
| October 8 | Texas A&M | Rice Stadium; Houston, TX | W 17–0 | 42,000 | |
| October 15 | Oklahoma State | Rice Stadium; Houston, TX | W 12–7 | 15,000 | |
| October 22 | at Alabama | Denny Stadium; Tuscaloosa, AL | L 0–14 | 30,000 | |
| October 29 | at North Texas State | Fouts Field; Denton, TX | W 41–16 | 2,000 | |
| November 5 | Cincinnati^{†} | Rice Stadium; Houston, TX | W 14–0 | 10,000 | |
| November 12 | at Florida State | Doak Campbell Stadium; Tallahassee, FL | W 7–6 | 10,400 | |
| November 26 | Tulsa | Rice Stadium; Houston, TX | L 16–26 | 7,000 | |
^{†}Homecoming; Rankings from AP Poll released prior to the game
