= 1960 Cincinnati Bearcats football team =

American college football season

1960 Cincinnati Bearcats football
- Conference: Missouri Valley Conference
- Record: 4–6 (1–2 MVC)
- Head coach: George Blackburn (6th season)
- Captain: Howard Converse
- Home stadium: Nippert Stadium

1960 Missouri Valley Conference football standings
	Conf.					Overall
Team	W		L		T	W		L		T
Wichita $	3	–	0	–	0	8	–	2	–	0
Tulsa	2	–	1	–	0	5	–	5	–	0
Cincinnati	1	–	2	–	0	4	–	6	–	0
North Texas State	0	–	3	–	0	2	–	6	–	1
$ – Conference champion

The 1960 Cincinnati Bearcats football team represented the University of Cincinnati in the Missouri Valley Conference (MVC) during the 1960 college football season. Led by George Blackburn in his sixth and final year as head coach, the Bearcats compiled an overall record of 4–6 with a mark of 1–2 in conference play, placing third in the MVC. The team played home games at Nippert Stadium in Cincinnati.

== Schedule ==
Date	Opponent	Site	Result	Attendance	Source
September 17	Hardin–Simmons*	Nippert Stadium; Cincinnati, OH	W 15–14	13,000	
September 24	Dayton*	Nippert Stadium; Cincinnati, OH	W 27–21	18,000	
October 1	at North Texas State	Fouts Field; Denton, TX	W 21–0	6,000	
October 7	at Detroit*	University of Detroit Stadium; Detroit, MI	L 0–14	15,745	
October 15	Wichita^{†}	Nippert Stadium; Cincinnati, OH	L 8–25	19,000	
October 22	Tulsa	Nippert Stadium; Cincinnati, OH	L 3–34	12,000	
October 29	Xavier*	Nippert Stadium; Cincinnati, OH (rivalry)	L 0–5	26,000	
November 5	at Houston*	Rice Stadium; Houston, TX	L 0–14	10,000	
November 12	at Marquette*	Marquette Stadium; Milwaukee, WI	W 33–13	11,200	
November 19	Miami (OH)*	Nippert Stadium; Cincinnati, OH (Victory Bell)	L 6–10	15,000	
*Non-conference game; ^{†}Homecoming; Source:
