= 1960 Utah State Aggies football team =

American college football season

1960 Utah State Aggies football

Skyline co-champion

Sun Bowl, L 13–20 vs. New Mexico State
- Conference: Skyline Conference
- Record: 9–2 (6–1 Skyline)
- Head coach: John Ralston (2nd season)
- Home stadium: Romney Stadium

1960 Skyline Conference football standings
	Conf.					Overall
Team	W		L		T	W		L		T
Utah State +	6	–	1	–	0	9	–	2	–	0
Wyoming +	6	–	1	–	0	8	–	2	–	0
Utah	5	–	1	–	0	7	–	3	–	0
New Mexico	4	–	2	–	0	5	–	5	–	0
Montana	2	–	5	–	0	5	–	5	–	0
BYU	2	–	5	–	0	3	–	8	–	0
Denver	1	–	6	–	0	3	–	7	–	0
Colorado State	1	–	6	–	0	2	–	8	–	0
+ – Conference co-champions

The 1960 Utah State Aggies football team was an American football team that represented Utah State University in the Skyline Conference during the 1960 college football season. In their second season under head coach John Ralston, the Aggies compiled a 9–2 record (6–1 against Skyline opponents), tied for the Skyline championship, and outscored opponents by a total of 274 to 85.

== Schedule ==
Date	Opponent	Rank	Site	Result	Attendance	Source
September 17	at Texas Western*		Kidd Field; El Paso, TX	W 20–7	10,500–12,000	
September 24	at Montana		Dornblaser Field; Missoula, MT	W 14–12	4,870	
October 1	Denver		Romney Stadium; Logan, UT	W 31–8	8,300–8,663	
October 8	vs. Idaho*		Bronco Stadium; Boise, ID	W 33–6	8,500	
October 15	at New Mexico		University Stadium; Albuquerque, NM	W 46–7	9,486	
October 22	Colorado State		Romney Stadium; Logan, UT	W 21–0	4,956–5,061	
October 29	BYU		Romney Stadium; Logan, UT (rivalry)	W 34–0	10,183	
November 5	Wyoming	No. T–18	Romney Stadium; Logan, UT (rivalry)	W 17–13	11,425	
November 12	at Pacific (CA)*	No. 19	Pacific Memorial Stadium; Stockton, CA	W 45–6	7,500	
November 19	at Utah		Ute Stadium; Salt Lake City, UT (rivalry)	L 0–6	29,261	
December 31	vs. No. 17 New Mexico State*		Kidd Field; El Paso, TX (Sun Bowl)	L 13–20	16,000–16,200	
*Non-conference game; Rankings from AP Poll released prior to the game
