= 1960 Oregon Ducks football team =

American college football season

1960 Oregon Ducks football

Liberty Bowl, L 12–41 vs. Penn State
- Conference: Independent
- Record: 7–3–1
- Head coach: Len Casanova (10th season)
- Captains: Dave Urell; Dave Grosz
- Home stadium: Hayward Field, Multnomah Stadium

1960 Western major college football independents records
	Conf.			Overall
Team	W	L	T	W		L		T
Oregon		–		7	–	3	–	1
Oregon State		–		6	–	3	–	1
San Jose State		–		5	–	4	–	0
Washington State		–		4	–	5	–	1
Air Force		–		4	–	6	–	0
Pacific (CA)		–		4	–	6	–	0
Idaho		–		1	–	9	–	0

The 1960 Oregon Ducks football team represented the University of Oregon as an independent during the 1960 college football season. In their 10th season under head coach Len Casanova, the Ducks compiled a 7–3–1 record and outscored their opponents, 206 to 130. The team played home games at Hayward Field in Eugene, Oregon and Multnomah Stadium in Portland, Oregon.

Days before the team would play their game against the University of Michigan, some key fixers in David Budin and Frank Rosenthal would get caught trying and failing to bribe halfback Michael "Mickey" Bruce to join in on what later became known as the 1961 NCAA University Division men's basketball gambling scandal by offering Bruce thousands of dollars for certain stipulations at hand, including recruiting his teammate in quarterback Dave Grosz to join him in the scheme also, with a hundred dollars being given to Bruce per week for the entire season afterward had he accepted the offer in order to keep the gamblers informed in the team's physical status throughout the season. However, due to the bribers being caught in their attempt to rig college football games alongside college basketball games, the game would continue as planned with no rigging involved (though Bruce would later testify against the fixers in court in order to maintain his innocence).

The team's statistical leaders included Dave Grosz with 910 passing yards, Dave Grayson with 631 rushing yards, and Cleveland Jones with 402 receiving yards.

== Schedule ==
Date	Time	Opponent	Rank	Site	Result	Attendance	Source
September 17	1:30 p.m.	Idaho		Hayward Field; Eugene, OR	W 33–6	13,200	
September 24		at Michigan		Michigan Stadium; Ann Arbor, MI	L 0–21	48,021	
October 1		at Utah		Ute Stadium; Salt Lake City, UT	W 20–17	23,653	
October 8		San Jose State		Hayward Field; Eugene, OR	W 33–0	10,000	
October 15		Washington State		Hayward Field; Eugene, OR	W 21–12	18,500	
October 22		at California		California Memorial Stadium; Berkeley, CA	W 20–0	36,000	
October 29		at No. 9 Washington		Husky Stadium; Seattle, WA (rivalry)	L 6–7	55,235	
November 5		Stanford		Multnomah Stadium; Portland, OR	W 27–6	18,727	
November 12		West Virginia		Multnomah Stadium; Portland, OR	W 20–6	11,864	
November 19		at Oregon State	No. 19	Parker Stadium; Corvallis, OR (Civil War)	T 14–14	27,009	
December 17		vs. No. 16 Penn State		Philadelphia Municipal Stadium; Philadelphia, PA (Liberty Bowl)	L 12–41	16,624	
Rankings from AP Poll released prior to the game; All times are in Pacific time; Source:
