= 1960 Mississippi Southern Southerners football team =

American college football season

1960 Mississippi Southern Southerners football
- Conference: Independent
- Record: 6–4
- Head coach: Thad Vann (12th season)
- Home stadium: Faulkner Field

1960 Southern non-major college football independents records
	Conf.			Overall
Team	W	L	T	W		L		T
Washington and Lee		–		8	–	0	–	1
Arlington State		–		9	–	2	–	0
Howard (AL)		–		8	–	1	–	0
Louisville		–		7	–	2	–	0
Mississippi Southern		–		6	–	4	–	0
Sewanee		–		4	–	3	–	1
Abilene Christian		–		5	–	5	–	0
Chattanooga		–		5	–	5	–	0
Arkansas State		–		4	–	5	–	0
Tampa		–		2	–	7	–	1
Trinity (TX)		–		2	–	7	–	1

The 1960 Mississippi Southern Southerners football team was an American football team that represented Mississippi Southern College (now known as the University of Southern Mississippi) as an independent during the 1960 college football season. In their twelfth year under head coach Thad Vann, the team compiled a 6–4 record.

== Schedule ==
Date	Opponent	Site	Result	Attendance	Source
September 23	Hardin–Simmons	Ladd Stadium; Mobile, AL	W 27–0	8,112	
October 1	West Texas State	Faulkner Field; Hattiesburg, MS	W 28–18	12,600	
October 8	at Trinity (TX)	Alamo Stadium; San Antonio, TX	W 16–0	6,000	
October 15	Florida State	Ladd Stadium; Mobile, AL	W 15–13	6,000	
October 22	NC State^{†}	Faulkner Field; Hattiesburg, MS	L 13–20	16,100	
October 29	at Abilene Christian	Public Schools Stadium; Abilene, TX	W 34–8	6,200	
November 5	at Arkansas State	Kays Stadium; Jonesboro, AR	L 13–14	7,000	
November 12	Louisiana Tech	Faulkner Field; Hattiesburg, MS (rivalry)	L 7–10	4,000	
November 18	Memphis State	Faulkner Field; Hattiesburg, MS (rivalry)	L 6–7	12,500	
November 24	at Chattanooga	Chamberlain Field; Chattanooga, TN	W 30–6	7,367	
^{†}Homecoming
