= 1960 Wichita Shockers football team =

American college football season

1960 Wichita Shockers football

MVC champion
- Conference: Missouri Valley Conference
- Record: 8–2 (3–0 MVC)
- Head coach: Hank Foldberg (1st season)
- Home stadium: Veterans Field

1960 Missouri Valley Conference football standings
	Conf.					Overall
Team	W		L		T	W		L		T
Wichita $	3	–	0	–	0	8	–	2	–	0
Tulsa	2	–	1	–	0	5	–	5	–	0
Cincinnati	1	–	2	–	0	4	–	6	–	0
North Texas State	0	–	3	–	0	2	–	6	–	1
$ – Conference champion

The 1960 Wichita Shockers football team was an American football team that represented the University of Wichita (now known as Wichita State University) as a member of the Missouri Valley Conference during the 1960 college football season. In its first season under head coach Hank Foldberg, the team compiled an 8–2 record (3–0 against MVC opponents), won the MVC championship, and outscored opponents by a total of 211 to 145. The team played its home games at Veterans Field, now known as Cessna Stadium. Pro Football Hall of Fame coach Bill Parcells was a freshman linebacker on the team.

== Schedule ==
Date	Time	Opponent	Site	Result	Attendance	Source
September 17		Denver*	Veterans Field; Wichita, KS	L 19–28	11,114	
September 24		Xavier*	Veterans Field; Wichita, KS	W 20–13	8,571	
October 1		at Montana State*	Gatton Field; Bozeman, MT	W 14–3	6,000	
October 15		at Cincinnati	Nippert Stadium; Cincinnati, OH	W 25–8	19,000	
October 22		at New Mexico State*	Memorial Stadium; Las Cruces, NM	L 8–40	8,616	
October 29		Dayton*	Veterans Field; Wichita, KS	W 7–6	5,992	
November 5		at Tulsa	Skelly Field; Tulsa, OK	W 21–20	11,226	
November 11		at Drake*	Drake Stadium; Des Moines, IA	W 32–7	3,500	
November 19		North Texas State	Veterans Field; Wichita, KS	W 34–6	10,454	
November 24	2:00 p.m.	West Texas State*	Veterans Field; Wichita, KS	W 31–14	6,751–6,900	
*Non-conference game; All times are in Central time; Source:
