= 1960 New Mexico State Aggies football team =

American college football season

1960 New Mexico State Aggies football

Border champion Sun Bowl champion

Sun Bowl, W 20–13 vs. Utah State
- Conference: Border Conference

Ranking
- Coaches: No. 19
- AP: No. 17
- Record: 11–0 (4–0 Border)
- Head coach: Warren B. Woodson (3rd season)
- Home stadium: Memorial Stadium

1960 Border Conference football standings
	Conf.					Overall
Team	W		L		T	W		L		T
No. 17 New Mexico State $	4	–	0	–	0	11	–	0	–	0
Arizona	3	–	0	–	0	7	–	3	–	0
Arizona State	3	–	2	–	0	7	–	3	–	0
Texas Western	2	–	3	–	0	4	–	5	–	1
West Texas State	1	–	4	–	0	3	–	7	–	0
Hardin–Simmons	0	–	4	–	0	0	–	10	–	0
Rankings from AP Poll

The 1960 New Mexico State Aggies football team represented New Mexico State University as a member of the Border Conference during the 1960 college football season. Led by third-year head coach Warren B. Woodson, the Aggies compiled an overall record of 11–0 with a mark of 4–0 in conference play, winning the Border Conference title. New Mexico State was invited to the Sun Bowl, where the Aggies defeated Utah State. This was the last time the Aggies would appear in a bowl game until the 2017 team appeared in the Arizona Bowl, defeating Utah State once again.

For the second time in what proved to be four consecutive years, a New Mexico State back won the National Collegiate Athletic Association (NCAA) rushing title, Pervis Atkins in 1959, Bob Gaiters in 1960, and Preacher Pilot in 1961 and 1962. Woodson was later inducted into the College Football Hall of Fame.

== Schedule ==
Date	Opponent	Rank	Site	Result	Attendance	Source
September 10	UNAM*		Memorial Stadium; Las Cruces, NM	W 41–0		
September 17	Tulsa*		Skelly Stadium; Tulsa, OK	W 38–18	17,278	
September 24	Trinity (TX)*		Memorial Stadium; Las Cruces, NM	W 45–0	6,937	
October 8	at New Mexico*		University Stadium; Albuquerque, NM (rivalry)	W 34–0	26,673–27,606	
October 15	McMurry*		Memorial Stadium; Las Cruces, NM	W 47–17		
October 22	Wichita*		Memorial Stadium; Las Cruces, NM	W 40–8	9,000	
October 29	at Arizona State	No. 18	Sun Devil Stadium; Tempe, AZ	W 27–24	28,300	
November 12	at West Texas State	No. 15	Buffalo Bowl; Canyon, TX	W 35–15	9,000	
November 19	at Hardin–Simmons	No. 14	Public Schools Stadium; Abilene, TX	W 40–3	4,000	
November 26	Texas Western	No. 15	Memorial Stadium; Las Cruces, NM (rivalry)	W 27–15	11,659	
December 31	vs. Utah State*	No. 17	Kidd Field; El Paso, TX (Sun Bowl)	W 20–13	16,000–16,200	
*Non-conference game; Rankings from AP Poll released prior to the game
