= 1960 Memphis State Tigers football team =

American college football season

1960 Memphis State Tigers football
- Conference: Independent
- Record: 8–2
- Head coach: Billy J. Murphy (3rd season)
- Captains: Wayne Armstrong; Miller Matthews
- Home stadium: Crump Stadium

1960 Southern major college football independents records
	Conf.			Overall
Team	W	L	T	W		L		T
No. 4 Navy		–		9	–	2	–	0
Memphis State		–		8	–	2	–	0
Houston		–		6	–	4	–	0
Miami (FL)		–		6	–	4	–	0
Florida State		–		3	–	6	–	1
Rankings from AP poll

The 1960 Memphis State Tigers football team represented Memphis State College (now known as the University of Memphis) as an independent during the 1960 college football season. In its first year of competition in the University Division and its third season under head coach Billy J. Murphy, the team compiled an 8–2 record and outscored opponents by a total of 303 to 85. Wayne Armstrong and Miller Matthews were the team captains. The team played its home games at Crump Stadium in Memphis, Tennessee.

The team's statistical leaders included James Earl Wright with 801 passing yards, James Earl Wright with 574 rushing yards, and Hal Sterling with 169 receiving yards, and James Earl Wright and John Griffin with 30 points scored each.

== Schedule ==
Date	Opponent	Site	Result	Attendance	Source
September 17	Arlington State	Crump Stadium; Memphis, TN	W 35–0	9,703–12,000	
September 24	at Tennessee Tech	Overall Field; Cookeville, TN	W 37–6	8,000	
October 1	No. 1 Ole Miss	Crump Stadium; Memphis, TN (rivalry)	L 20–31	24,711–34,711	
October 8	at North Texas State	Fouts Field; Denton, TX	W 44–0	4,000	
October 15	Hardin–Simmons^{†}	Crump Stadium; Memphis, TN	W 42–7	15,218	
October 22	at Mississippi State	Scott Field; Starkville, MS	L 0–21	27,000	
October 29	VMI	Crump Stadium; Memphis, TN	W 21–8	10,933	
November 5	Abilene Christian	Crump Stadium; Memphis, TN	W 55–6	7,950	
November 12	Chattanooga	Crump Stadium; Memphis, TN	W 42–0	9,000–9,014	
November 18	at Mississippi Southern	Faulkner Field; Hattiesburg, MS (rivalry)	W 7–6	7,367	
^{†}Homecoming; Rankings from AP Poll released prior to the game; Source:
