= 1960 Washington State Cougars football team =

American college football season

1960 Washington State Cougars football
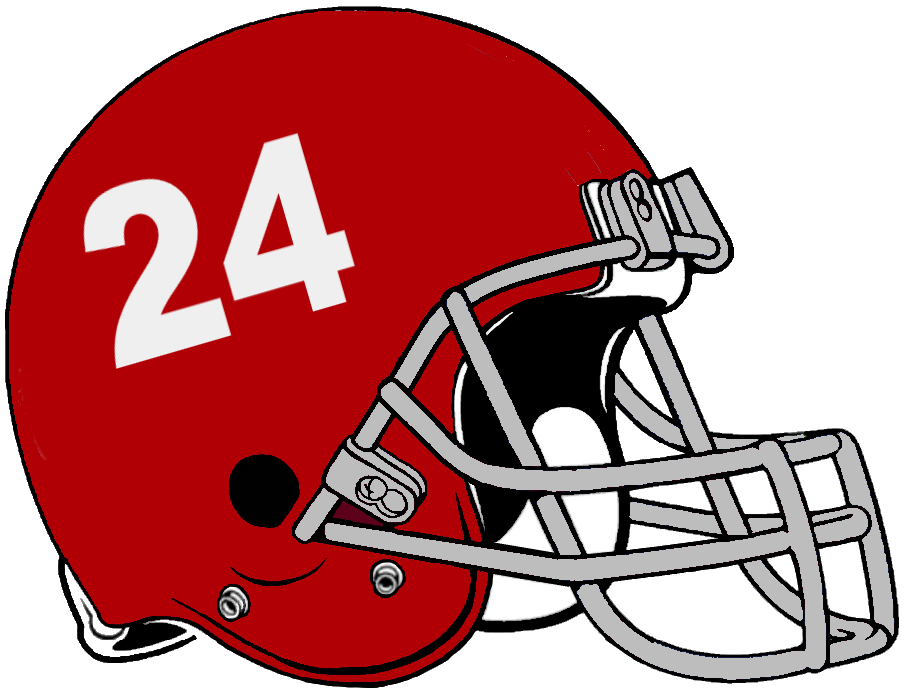
- Conference: Independent
- Record: 4–5–1
- Head coach: Jim Sutherland (5th season)
- Home stadium: Rogers Field, Memorial Stadium

1960 Western major college football independents records
	Conf.			Overall
Team	W	L	T	W		L		T
Oregon		–		7	–	3	–	1
Oregon State		–		6	–	3	–	1
San Jose State		–		5	–	4	–	0
Washington State		–		4	–	5	–	1
Air Force		–		4	–	6	–	0
Pacific (CA)		–		4	–	6	–	0
Idaho		–		1	–	9	–	0

The 1960 Washington State Cougars football team was an American football team that represented Washington State University as an independent during the 1960 college football season. In their fifth season under head coach Jim Sutherland, the Cougars compiled a 4–5–1 record and outscored their opponents 210 to 161.

The team's statistical leaders included Mel Melin with 1,638 passing yards, Keith Lincoln with 543 rushing yards, and Hugh Campbell with 881 receiving yards.

== Schedule ==
Date	Opponent	Site	Result	Attendance	Source
September 17	Stanford	Memorial Stadium; Spokane, WA	W 15–14	22,000	
September 23	at Denver	DU Stadium; Denver, CO	L 26–28	19,504	
October 1	at Arizona State	Sun Devil Stadium; Tempe, AZ	L 21–24	29,600	
October 8	at California	California Memorial Stadium; Berkeley, CA	T 21–21	31,000	
October 15	at Oregon	Hayward Field; Eugene, OR	L 12–21	18,500	
October 22	Pacific (CA)	Rogers Field; Pullman, WA	W 51–12	15,500	
October 29	at San Jose State	Spartan Stadium; San Jose CA	W 29–6	19,500	
November 5	Oregon State^{†}	Rogers Field; Pullman, WA	L 10–20	15,600	
November 12	at Idaho	Neale Stadium; Moscow, ID (rivalry)	W 18–7	8,500	
November 19	No. 5 Washington	Memorial Stadium; Spokane, WA (rivalry)	L 7–8	28,750	
^{†}Homecoming; Rankings from AP Poll released prior to the game

== NFL draft ==
One Cougar was selected in the 1961 NFL draft, which was 20 rounds and 280 selections.

Player	Position	Round	Overall	Franchise
Keith Lincoln	Back	5	61	Chicago Bears
