= 1960 Miami Hurricanes football team =

American college football season

1960 Miami Hurricanes football
- Conference: Independent
- Record: 6–4
- Head coach: Andy Gustafson (13th season)
- Home stadium: Miami Orange Bowl

1960 Southern major college football independents records
	Conf.			Overall
Team	W	L	T	W		L		T
No. 4 Navy		–		9	–	2	–	0
Memphis State		–		8	–	2	–	0
Houston		–		6	–	4	–	0
Miami (FL)		–		6	–	4	–	0
Florida State		–		3	–	6	–	1
Rankings from AP poll

The 1960 Miami Hurricanes football team represented the University of Miami as an independent during the 1960 college football season. Led by 13th-year head coach Andy Gustafson, the Hurricanes played their home games at the Miami Orange Bowl in Miami, Florida. Miami finished the season 6–4.

== Schedule ==
Date	Opponent	Site	Result	Attendance	Source
September 30	North Carolina	Miami Orange Bowl; Miami, FL	W 29–12	40,252	
October 8	at Pittsburgh	Pitt Stadium; Pittsburgh, PA	L 6–17	29,455	
October 14	South Carolina	Miami Orange Bowl; Miami, FL	W 21–6	28,754	
October 22	at No. 17 Auburn	Cliff Hare Stadium; Auburn, AL	L 7–20	25,000	
October 28	Boston College	Miami Orange Bowl; Miami, FL	W 10–7	30,699	
November 4	Florida State	Miami Orange Bowl; Miami, FL (rivalry)	W 25–7	37,984	
November 12	Notre Dame	Miami Orange Bowl; Miami, FL (rivalry)	W 28–21	58,062	
November 18	No. 14 Syracuse	Miami Orange Bowl; Miami, FL	L 14–21	45,271	
November 26	No. 19 Florida	Miami Orange Bowl; Miami, FL (rivalry)	L 0–18	60,122	
December 2	Air Force	Miami Orange Bowl; Miami, FL	W 23–14	29,678	
Rankings from AP Poll released prior to the game; Source:
