= Lisle Blackbourn =

American football player and coach (1899–1983)

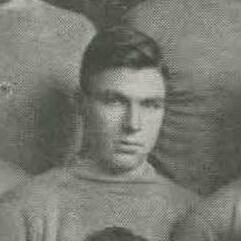
- Blackbourn c. 1918

Biographical details
- Born: June 3, 1899; Beetown, Wisconsin, U.S.
- Died: June 14, 1983 (aged 84); Lancaster, Wisconsin, U.S.
- Education: Lawrence College (1925)

Playing career
- 1918: Lawrence
- 1921–1923: Lawrence
- Position: Lineman

Coaching career (HC unless noted)
- 1924: Lawrence (freshmen)
- 1925–1946: Washington HS (WI)
- 1947: Wisconsin (scout)
- 1948: Wisconsin (backs)
- 1949: Marquette (line)
- 1950–1953: Marquette
- 1954–1957: Green Bay Packers
- 1958: Carroll (WI)
- 1959–1960: Marquette

Head coaching record
- Overall: 30–32–4 (college); 17–31 (NFL); 141–30–6 (high school)

Lisle William "Liz" Blackbourn (June 3, 1899 – June 14, 1983) was an American football coach in Wisconsin, most notably as the third head coach of the Green Bay Packers, from 1954 through 1957, and the final head coach at Marquette University in Milwaukee in 1960.

== Early years ==
Born in Beetown, Wisconsin, in 1899, Blackbourn attended high school in Lancaster and played college football at Lawrence College in Appleton, under head coach Mark Catlin, Sr. He arrived on campus in 1918, but left after a semester to work on the family farm for several years, then returned to school. He earned "all-state" honors three times for the Vikings and also was a catcher on the baseball team. While finishing his degree at Lawrence, he coached the Vikings' freshman football team in the fall of 1924.

His brother was professional baseball player Verne Blackbourn.

== Coaching career ==
=== High school coach ===
After earning his degree in 1925, he became head coach at Washington High School in Milwaukee and continued for 22 seasons, compiling a 141–30–6 record (.814) through 1946. While remaining as athletic director at the school, he was a scout for the University of Wisconsin–Madison under head coach Harry Stuhldreher.

=== College coach ===
In March 1948, Blackbourn became the backfield coach at Wisconsin under thirteenth-year head coach Stuhldreher, who resigned in December. With a new staff at UW for 1949 under Ivy Williamson, Blackbourn moved over to Marquette University in Milwaukee as the line coach under longtime head coach Frank Murray, who stepped down after the season for health reasons and was succeeded by Blackbourn in 1950. In 1953, Marquette posted a 6–3–1 record, their best in over a decade.

=== Green Bay Packers ===
Succeeding Gene Ronzani as head coach of the Green Bay Packers, Blackbourn was hired in January 1954. The franchise's third head coach, he had a 17–31 (.354) record in four years, with no post-season appearances, as the only scheduled playoff then was the NFL title game. Requested to resign after a disappointing 3–9 campaign in 1957, he refused and was fired in January 1958. He had a year remaining on a five-year contract, at $25,000 annually, and backfield coach Ray McLean was promoted to head coach.

Blackbourn drafted many future hall of famers, including Forrest Gregg, Bart Starr, Paul Hornung, Jim Taylor, Jerry Kramer, and Ray Nitschke. He was still the Packers' head coach during the first part of 1958 NFL draft, with the first four rounds conducted in early December 1957. Green Bay's first four picks in that draft are considered among the best by a team in league history; in addition to Taylor, Nitschke, and Kramer, consensus All-American linebacker Dan Currie was selected third overall.

=== Carroll College ===
After the dismissal by the Packers, Blackbourn became the head coach at Carroll College in Waukesha for a single season in 1958, and led the Pioneers to a 6–2 record.

=== Return to Marquette ===
The sixteenth head coach at Marquette from 1950 through 1953, Blackbourn returned in 1959 to lead the program for its final two seasons. His record there over six seasons was 24–30–4 (.448), which is third in total wins and twelfth in winning percentage.

== Later life and death ==
After the Marquette football program was discontinued in December 1960, Blackbourn was a scout in professional football for the Packers and others until he retired in 1972. He was inducted into the Wisconsin Athletic Hall of Fame in 1978, and died in 1983 in his hometown of Lancaster.

== Head coaching record ==
=== College ===
Year	Team	Overall	Conference	Standing	Bowl/playoffs
Marquette Hilltoppers (Independent) (1950–1953)
1950	Marquette	5–3–1			
1951	Marquette	4–6–1			
1952	Marquette	3–5–1			
1953	Marquette	6–3–1			
Carroll Pioneers (College Conference of Illinois) (1958)
1958	Carroll	6–2	5–2	T–2nd	
Carroll:		6–2	5–2		
Marquette Warriors (Independent) (1959–1960)
1959	Marquette	3–7			
1960	Marquette	3–6			
Marquette:		24–30–4			
Total:		30–32–4			

=== NFL ===
Team	Year	Regular season			
Team	Year	Won	Lost	Ties	Finish
GB	1954	4	8	0	5th in NFL Western Conference
GB	1955	6	6	0	3rd in NFL Western Conference
GB	1956	4	8	0	6th in NFL Western Conference
GB	1957	3	9	0	6th in NFL Western Conference
Total		17	31	0	
