= 1960 Colorado State Rams football team =

American college football season

1960 Colorado State Rams football
- Conference: Skyline Conference
- Record: 2–8 (1–6 Skyline)
- Head coach: Don Mullison (5th season)
- Home stadium: Colorado Field

1960 Skyline Conference football standings
	Conf.					Overall
Team	W		L		T	W		L		T
Utah State +	6	–	1	–	0	9	–	2	–	0
Wyoming +	6	–	1	–	0	8	–	2	–	0
Utah	5	–	1	–	0	7	–	3	–	0
New Mexico	4	–	2	–	0	5	–	5	–	0
Montana	2	–	5	–	0	5	–	5	–	0
BYU	2	–	5	–	0	3	–	8	–	0
Denver	1	–	6	–	0	3	–	7	–	0
Colorado State	1	–	6	–	0	2	–	8	–	0
+ – Conference co-champions

The 1960 Colorado State Rams football team represented Colorado State University in the Skyline Conference during the 1960 college football season. In their fifth season under head coach Don Mullison, the Rams compiled a 2–8 record (1–6 against Skyline opponents), finished last in the Skyline Conference, and were outscored by opponents by a total of 240 to 92.

The team's statistical leaders included Jon Crider with 305 passing yards, Brady Keys with 368 rushing yards, and Ward Gates with 209 receiving yards.

== Schedule ==
Date	Opponent	Site	Result	Attendance	Source
September 17	at Arizona State*	Sun Devil Stadium; Tempe, AZ	L 0–39	28,000	
September 24	at Air Force*	DU Stadium; Denver, CO (rivalry)	L 8–32	16,471	
October 1	BYU	Colorado Field; Fort Collins, CO	W 8–7		
October 8	Drake*	Colorado Field; Fort Collins, CO	W 30–3	6,000	
October 15	Wyoming^{†}	Colorado Field; Fort Collins, CO (rivalry)	L 8–40	12,500	
October 22	at Utah State	Romney Stadium; Logan, UT	L 0–21	4,956–5,061	
October 29	Montana	Colorado Field; Fort Collins, CO	L 14–26	2,800	
November 5	Utah	Colorado Field; Fort Collins, CO	L 6–27	3,500	
November 12	at New Mexico	University Stadium; Albuquerque, NM	L 6–24	17,219	
November 24	at Denver	DU Stadium; Denver, CO	L 12–21	6,729	
*Non-conference game; ^{†}Homecoming
