= 1960 Chattanooga Moccasins football team =

American college football season

1960 Chattanooga Moccasins football
- Conference: Independent
- Record: 5–5
- Head coach: Scrappy Moore (30th season)
- Captains: Tom Weathers; Dan Sheehan
- Home stadium: Chamberlain Field

1960 Southern non-major college football independents records
	Conf.			Overall
Team	W	L	T	W		L		T
Washington and Lee		–		8	–	0	–	1
Arlington State		–		9	–	2	–	0
Howard (AL)		–		8	–	1	–	0
Louisville		–		7	–	2	–	0
Mississippi Southern		–		6	–	4	–	0
Sewanee		–		4	–	3	–	1
Abilene Christian		–		5	–	5	–	0
Chattanooga		–		5	–	5	–	0
Arkansas State		–		4	–	5	–	0
Tampa		–		2	–	7	–	1
Trinity (TX)		–		2	–	7	–	1

The 1960 Chattanooga Moccasins football team was an American football team that represented the University of Chattanooga (now known as the University of Tennessee at Chattanooga) during the 1960 college football season. In their 30th year under head coach Scrappy Moore, the team compiled a 5–5 record.

== Schedule ==
Date	Opponent	Rank	Site	Result	Attendance	Source
September 16	Jacksonville State		Chamberlain Field; Chattanooga, TN	W 35–0	1,500	
September 23	Abilene Christian		Chamberlain Field; Chattanooga, TN	W 21–0	6,500	
September 30	McMurry		Chamberlain Field; Chattanooga, TN	W 33–13	6,000	
October 8	at Auburn		Cliff Hare Stadium; Auburn, AL	L 0–10	30,000	
October 14	Middle Tennessee^{†}	No. 6	Chamberlain Field; Chattanooga, TN	W 24–6	9,000–9,500	
October 22	at No. 12 (major) Tennessee	No. 7	Shields–Watkins Field; Knoxville, TN	L 0–35	25,200	
October 29	at Tennessee Tech		Overall Field; Cookeville, TN	W 20–6	6,500	
November 5	at No. 6 (major) Ole Miss		Hemingway Stadium; Oxford, MS	L 0–45	13,500–14,000	
November 12	at Memphis State		Crump Stadium; Memphis, TN	L 0–42	9,000–9,014	
November 24	Mississippi Southern		Chamberlain Field; Chattanooga, TN	L 6–30	7,367–10,000	
^{†}Homecoming; Rankings from AP Poll released prior to the game
