= Joe Novsek =

American football player (1939–2023)

No. 71
- Position: Defensive lineman

Personal information
- Born: May 29, 1939; Cardale, Pennsylvania, U.S.
- Died: April 24, 2023 (aged 83); Lawrenceville, Illinois, U.S.
- Listed height: 6 ft 4 in (1.93 m)
- Listed weight: 237 lb (108 kg)

Career information
- High school: Redstone (Republic, Pennsylvania)
- College: Tulsa
- NFL draft: 1961: 19th round, 259th overall pick
- AFL draft: 1961: 17th round, 131st overall pick

Career history
- Oakland Raiders (1962–1963); Baltimore Colts (1964)*
- * Offseason or practice squad member only

Awards and highlights
- AFL All-Rookie Team (1962); 2× All-MVC (1959, 1961)

Career AFL statistics
- Games played: 14
- Games started: 2
- Kickoff returns: 1
- Stats at Pro Football Reference

Joseph John Novsek II (Pronounced: NAHV-sek) (May 29, 1939 – April 24, 2023) was an American professional football player who was a defensive lineman for one season with the Oakland Raiders of the American Football League (AFL). He played college football for the Tulsa Golden Hurricane.

== Early life and education ==
Joe Novsek was born on May 29, 1939, in Cardale, Pennsylvania. He attended Redstone High School near there, graduating in c. 1958. After his high school career, Novsek accepted a scholarship offer from The University of Tulsa in Oklahoma. Upon joining the school, he immediately made the team roster. As a sophomore in 1959, he was named second-team all-conference at the tackle position. He was named co-team captain to start his junior year. As a senior in 1961, he was named first-team all-conference by Associated Press.

== Professional career ==
Novsek was selected in both the 1961 NFL draft (by Baltimore Colts, 19th round, 259th overall) and 1961 AFL draft (by Oakland Raiders, 17th round, 131st overall), but chose to finish his collegiate career. At the end of the 1961 college football season, Novsek chose the Raiders in the AFL over the NFL's Colts. He was used by the Raiders on each position of the defensive line, and appeared in all fourteen games of the 1962 season. He was a starter in two of their games. He was named to the AFL's All-Rookie team at the end of the season. He was released at roster cuts in August 1963. He was signed by the Baltimore Colts, who drafted him two years prior, in 1964. Novsek was released at the 1964 roster cuts, ending his professional career.

== Death ==
Novsek died on April 24, 2023, at the age of 83.
