= Terry Nofsinger =

American football player (1938–2007)

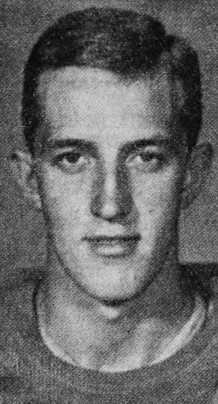
- Nofsinger, circa 1960

No. 18, 12, 14
- Position: Quarterback

Personal information
- Born: June 13, 1938; Salt Lake City, Utah, U.S.
- Died: October 2, 2007 (aged 69); Park City, Utah, U.S.
- Listed height: 6 ft 4 in (1.93 m)
- Listed weight: 215 lb (98 kg)

Career information
- High school: Salt Lake City (UT) South
- College: Utah
- NFL draft: 1961: 17th round, 230th overall pick

Career history
- Pittsburgh Steelers (1961–1964); St. Louis Cardinals (1965–1966); Atlanta Falcons (1967)

Career NFL statistics
- Passing attempts: 260
- Passing completions: 118
- Completion percentage: 45.4%
- TD–INT: 4–12
- Passing yards: 1,357
- Passer rating: 47.5
- Stats at Pro Football Reference

William Terry Nofsinger (July 13, 1938 – October 2, 2007) was an American professional football player who was a quarterback for seven seasons for the Pittsburgh Steelers (1961–1964), the St. Louis Cardinals (1965–1966), and the Atlanta Falcons (1967). He was one of the select few left-handed quarterbacks in his era.

Nofsinger had a 1-5 record to show for six career starts. Five of them took place consecutively for the Cardinals in the 1966 campaign, when he replaced the injured Charley Johnson in the ninth week of the season. The offense-challenged Cardinals won just one of those games to fall out of postseason contention. In that span, Nofsinger had a 42 percent completion rate, eight interceptions and two touchdown passes.
