= 1960 Pacific Tigers football team =

American college football season

1960 Pacific Tigers football
- Conference: Independent
- Record: 4–6
- Head coach: Jack Myers (8th season)
- Home stadium: Pacific Memorial Stadium

1960 Western major college football independents records
	Conf.			Overall
Team	W	L	T	W		L		T
Oregon		–		7	–	3	–	1
Oregon State		–		6	–	3	–	1
San Jose State		–		5	–	4	–	0
Washington State		–		4	–	5	–	1
Air Force		–		4	–	6	–	0
Pacific (CA)		–		4	–	6	–	0
Idaho		–		1	–	9	–	0

The 1960 Pacific Tigers football team represented the College of the Pacific (COP)—now known as the University of the Pacific (UOP)—as an independent during the 1960 college football season. Led by Jack Myers in his eighth and final year as head coach, the Tigers compiled a record of 4–6 and were outscored by opponents 278 to 140. The team played home games at Pacific Memorial Stadium in Stockton, California.

== Schedule ==
Date	Opponent	Site	Result	Attendance	Source
September 17	at No. 3 Washington	Husky Stadium; Seattle, WA	L 6–55	39,047	
September 24	Marquette	Pacific Memorial Stadium; Stockton, CA	L 0–20	10,500	
October 1	Hawaii	Pacific Memorial Stadium; Stockton, CA	W 28–20	8,000	
October 8	at Villanova	Villanova Stadium; Villanova, PA	W 24–7	9,370	
October 22	at Washington State	Rogers Field; Pullman, WA	L 12–51	15,500	
October 29	Idaho	Pacific Memorial Stadium; Stockton, CA	W 25–14	7,000	
November 5	San Jose State	Pacific Memorial Stadium; Stockton, CA (Victory Bell)	W 26–20	15,000	
November 12	No. 19 Utah State	Pacific Memorial Stadium; Stockton, CA	L 6–45	7,500	
November 19	Iowa State	Pacific Memorial Stadium; Stockton, CA	L 6–14	6,500	
November 26	at Fresno State	Ratcliffe Stadium; Fresno, CA	L 7–32	10,500	
Rankings from AP Poll released prior to the game; Source:

== Team players in the NFL ==
The following College of the Pacific players were selected in the 1961 NFL draft.

Player	Position	Round	Overall	NFL team
Willie Hector	Tackle	5	60	Los Angeles Rams
