= Larry Vargo =

American football player (born 1939)

- Vargo in 1961

No. 85, 83, 25
- Positions: End, safety, tight end, split end, linebacker

Personal information
- Born: April 5, 1939 (age 87); Iron Mountain, Michigan, U.S.
- Listed height: 6 ft 3 in (1.91 m)
- Listed weight: 215 lb (98 kg)

Career information
- High school: Servite (Detroit, Michigan)
- College: Detroit (1960-1961)
- NFL draft: 1961: 11th round, 150th overall pick
- AFL draft: 1961: 21st round, 164th overall pick

Career history
- Detroit Lions (1962–1963); Minnesota Vikings (1964–1965); New York Giants (1966)

Awards and highlights
- Led NCAA in receiving touchdowns (1961); North-South Shrine Game (1961); Senior Bowl (1962)

Career NFL statistics
- Interceptions: 6
- Fumble recoveries: 3
- Touchdowns: 1
- Stats at Pro Football Reference

Lawrence F. Vargo. Jr. (born April 5, 1939) is an American former football player. He played college football for the Detroit Titans and led the country with eight receiving touchdowns in 1961. He later played, principally on defense, in the National Football League (NFL) for the Detroit Lions (1962-1963), Minnesota Vikings (1964-1965), and New York Giants (1966).

== Early life ==
Vargo was born in 1939 at Iron Mountain in Michigan's Upper Peninsula. His family moved to Detroit when he was approximately five years old. He attended Detroit's Catholic schools and played high school football as an end on offense and defense at Servite High School in Detroit. He also played at quarterback as a senior due to injuries to the team's two quarterbacks. He credited a high school coach, Mr. Hogan, with teaching him to hit opponents with enthusiasm and "make 'em a little scared of you."

== College football ==
Vargo was offered a basketball scholarship to the University of Michigan and attended the university for three months. He then enrolled at the University of Detroit but lost a year of eligibility due to the transfer. He played college football at the end position on both offense and defense for the Detroit Titans from 1959 to 1961. As a junior in 1960, and despite playing with a hairline fracture of his forearm, he caught 20 passes for 308 yards and four touchdowns and helped lead the Titans to a 7–2 record. As a senior in 1961, he caught 32 passes for 601 yards. He led the NCAA major colleges with eight receiving touchdowns in 1961, and his 601 receiving yards ranked fourth in major-college football. In a loss to Navy in 1961, Vargo tallied 11 receptions for 152 yards and three touchdowns. He played in both the Senior Bowl and the North–South Shrine Game after the 1961 season.

== Professional football ==
Vargo was drafted by the Detroit Lions in the 1960 NFL draft, played another year of college ball, and joined the Lions for the 1962 season. He played for the team in both 1962 and 1963. He played mostly on special teams in 1962 and also had playing time at tight end in 1963. Due to an injury to Yale Lary and the death of Night Train Lane's wife (Dinah Washington), Vargo also played at defensive back for the last three games of the 1963 season and had an interception return for touchdown.

Vargo was traded in September 1964, playing for the Minnesota Vikings in 1964 and 1965.

Vargo finished his playing career with the New York Giants. When he joined the Giants in 1966, he was switched to linebacker. He was injured in the seventh game of the 1966 season and missed the remainder of the season. Despite the injury, the Giants signed Vargo to a two-year contract, and he attempted a comeback in 1967. His knee was injured in an exhibition game in 1967. He missed the entire 1967 season, attempted a comeback again in 1968, and was released by Giants in August 1968.

In five years in the NFL, Vargo played in 57 games, 26 as a starter, scored one touchdown, and had six interceptions and three fumble recoveries.

== Later life ==
Vargo was inducted into the Detroit Mercy Titans Hall of Fame in 1987.

== See also ==
- List of NCAA major college football yearly receiving leaders
