= 1960 small college football rankings =

- Selectors: AP, UPI
- No. 1: Ohio
- Small college football rankings (AP, UPI)
- «1959 1961»

The 1960 small college football rankings are rankings of college football teams representing smaller college and university teams during the 1960 college football season. Separate rankings were published by the Associated Press (AP) and the United Press International (UPI). The AP rankings were selected by a board of experts, and the UPI rankings were selected by a board of 47 small-college coaches from throughout the country.

Three small-college teams finished the 1960 season with perfect 10–0 records: the Ohio Bobcats, the Lenoir Rhyne Bears and the Humboldt State Lumberjacks. In their final vote, the AP board members selected Ohio as the small-college champion, based on its tougher strength of schedule. Lenoir Rhyne and Humboldt State finished second and third, respectively, in the AP rnakings.

The UPI board of coaches also selected Ohio as the small-college champion with first-place votes from 28 of the participating coaches. The UPI ranked Bowling Green second with its sole setback having been in a close loss to Ohio.

== Legend ==
	Increase in ranking
	Decrease in ranking
	Not ranked previous week
(#–#)	Win–loss record
(Italics)	Number of first place votes
т	Tied with team above or below also with this symbol

== AP poll ==
	Week 1 Oct 6	Week 2 Oct 13	Week 3 Oct 20	Week 4 Oct 27	Week 5 Nov 3	Week 6 Nov 10	Week 7 Nov 17	Week 8 Nov 24	Week 9 Dec 1	
1.	Ohio	Ohio (4–0) (2)	Lenoir Rhyne (5–0)	Ohio (6–0) (4)	Ohio (7–0) (4)	Ohio (8–0) (4)	Ohio (9–0) (4)	Ohio (4)	Ohio (10–0) (4)	1.
2.	Lenoir Rhyne	Lenoir Rhyne (4–0) (2)	Ohio (5–0)	Lenoir Rhyne (6–0) (2)	Florida A&M (5–0) (2)	Lenoir Rhyne (8–0) (2)	Lenoir Rhyne (9–0) (2)	Lenoir Rhyne	Lenoir Rhyne (10–0)	2.
3.	Lehigh	Lehigh (3–0)	Tufts	Florida A&M (4–0) (1)	Lenoir Rhyne (7–0) (1)	Florida A&M (6–0) (1)	Florida A&M (1)	Iowa State Teachers (9–0) (1)	Humboldt State (10–0) (1)	3.
4.	UMass	Mississippi Southern (3–0)	Iowa State Teachers (1)	Bowling Green (5–0)	Iowa State Teachers (7–0)	Bowling Green (7–0)	Iowa State Teachers	Bowling Green (8–1)	Whitworth (9–0)	4.
5.	Whitworth	Whitworth (4–0)	Whitworth (5–0)	Tufts (5–0) (1)	Bowling Green (6–0)	Iowa State Teachers (8–0)	Whitworth	Whitworth	West Chester (9–0) (1)	5.
6.	Texas A&I	Chattanooga (3–1)	Humboldt State (5–0)	Whitworth (6–0)	Southern Illinois	Tufts (7–0) (1)	Fresno State	Southern	Bowling Green (8–1)	6.
7.	San Francisco State	Humboldt State (4–0)	Chattanooga	Southern Illinois (6–0)	Humboldt State (7–0)	Whitworth (8–0)	Humboldt State	Muskingum	Louisiana Tech (8–2)	7.
8.	Western Illinois	Southern Illinois (4–0)	Southeastern Louisiana (5–0)	Humboldt State (6–0)	Fresno State	Fresno State (7–0)	Bowling Green (7–1)	Humboldt State	Hillsdale (9–1)	8.
9.	Muskingum	Muskingum (3–0)	Southern Illinois (5–0)	Iowa State Teachers (6–0)	Tufts (6–0) (1)	Humboldt State (8–0)	West Chester	Louisiana Tech	Muskingum (9–0)	9.
10.	Florida A&M	Florida A&M (3–0)	Florida A&M (3–0)	Southeastern Louisiana (6–0)	Muskingum	Muskingum (7–0)	Muskingum	West Chester (1)	Iowa State Teachers (9–1)	10.
	Week 1 Oct 6	Week 2 Oct 13	Week 3 Oct 20	Week 4 Oct 27	Week 5 Nov 3	Week 6 Nov 10	Week 7 Nov 17	Week 8 Nov 24	Week 9 Dec 1	
		Dropped: 4 UMass; 6 Texas A&I; 7 San Francisco State; 8 Western Illinois	Dropped: 3 Lehigh; 4 Mississippi Southern; 9 Muskingum	Dropped: 7 Chattanooga	Dropped: 6 Whitworth; 10 Southeastern Louisiana	Dropped: 6 Southern Illinois	Dropped: 6 Tufts	Dropped: 3 Florida A&M; 6 Fresno State	Dropped: 6 Southern U.	

== UPI coaches poll ==
	Week 1 Sept 29	Week 2 Oct 6	Week 3 Oct 13	Week 4 Oct 20	Week 5 Oct 27	Week 6 Nov 3	Week 7 Nov 10	Week 8 Nov 17	Week 9 Nov 24	
1.	Bowling Green (4)	Bowling Green (12)	Ohio (20) (20)	Ohio (20)	Ohio (21)	Ohio (22)	Ohio (21)	Ohio (29)	Ohio (28)	1.
2.	Louisiana Tech (4)	Ohio (3)	Bowling Green (5)	Bowling Green (3)	Bowling Green (5)	Bowling Green (6)	Bowling Green (10)	Bowling Green	Bowling Green	2.
3.	Ohio (2)	Lehigh (4)	Lenoir Rhyne (2)	Lenoir Rhyne (2)	Lenoir Rhyne (2)	Lenoir Rhyne (2)	Lenoir Rhyne (1)	Lenoir Rhyne (2)	Lenoir Rhyne (3)	3.
4.	Lenoir Rhyne (3)	Louisiana Tech (1)	Lehigh (2)	Chattanooga (5)	Chattanooga (1)	Tufts	Tufts	Florida A&M (1)	Muskingum (1)	4.
5.	Chattanooga (1)	Chattanooga (2)	Chattanooga (2)	Southern Illinois (1)	Southern Illinois (1)	Southern Illinois (1)	Florida A&M (1)	Louisiana Tech (1)	Florida A&M	5.
6.	Miami (OH) (1)	Lenoir Rhyne (1)	Idaho State (1)	Tufts (1)	Tufts	Chattanooga	Louisiana Tech	Fresno State (1)	Louisiana Tech (1)	6.
7.	Lehigh (2)	Southern Illinois (1)	Southern Illinois (1)	Louisiana Tech	Louisiana Tech	Southeastern Louisiana (1)	Southeastern Louisiana	Muskingum (1)	Iowa State Teachers	7.
8.	Butler (1)	Idaho State (1)	Louisiana Tech	Miami (OH)	Southeastern Louisiana (1)	Louisiana Tech	Fresno State (1)	Southeastern Louisiana	Humboldt State (1)	8.
9.	Idaho State (1)	Miami (OH)	Tufts	Lehigh	Idaho State	Florida A&M (2)	Muskingum	Iowa State Teachers	Fresno State	9.
10.	Northern Illinois (1)	Fresno State	Fresno State т	Southeastern Louisiana (1)	Lehigh	Muskingum	Southern Illinois т	Southern Illinois	Southeastern Louisiana (1)	10.
11.	Fresno State	Texas A&I	Southeastern Louisiana т	Fresno State	Iowa State Teachers	Fresno State	Chattanooga т	Humboldt State	Miami (OH)	11.
12.	East Texas State	Tufts	Hillsdale т	Hillsdale	Montana State	Hillsdale	Humboldt State	Miami (OH)	West Chester	12.
13.	Kent State	Western Illinois т	Iowa State Teachers т	Western Michigan	Florida A&M т	Iowa State Teachers т	Iowa State Teachers	Tufts т	Hillsdale	13.
14.	Southern Illinois	Tennessee Tech т	Whitworth	Florida A&M т	Connecticut т	Humboldt State т	Arkansas State	Whitworth т	Willamette	14.
15.	Delaware	Pittsburgh (KS)	Kent State т	Muskingum т	Fresno State	Montana State	Miami (OH)	West Chester т	Whitworth т	15.
16.	Montana State	Amherst	Miami (OH) т	Idaho State т	Hillsdale	Miami (OH)	Willamette т	Hillsdale т	Southern U. т	16.
17.	Western Illinois	Northern Michigan	East Texas State	Iowa State Teachers т	Louisville	Willamette	West Chester т	Chattanooga	Northeast Missouri т	17.
18.	Hillsdale т	Southeastern Louisiana	Florida A&M	Tennessee Tech	Miami (OH)	Idaho State т	Northern Michigan	Northeast Missouri т	Adams State т	18.
19.	Northern Michigan т	Hillsdale т	Muskingum т	Whitworth	Northern Michigan	Lehigh т	Hillsdale т	Tennessee Tech т	Southern Illinois	19.
20.	Lamar Tech т	Abilene Christian т	Northern Michigan т	Arkansas State	Tennessee Tech т	Northern Michigan	Northeast Missouri т	Arkansas State	Tufts т	20.
21.	Texas A&I т	Tennessee A&I т			Buffalo т				Bucknell т	21.
22.	West Chester т									22.
	Week 1 Sept 29	Week 2 Oct 6	Week 3 Oct 13	Week 4 Oct 20	Week 5 Oct 27	Week 6 Nov 3	Week 7 Nov 10	Week 8 Nov 17	Week 9 Nov 24	
		Dropped: 8 Butler; 10 Northern Illinois; 12 East Texas State; 13 Kent State; 15 Delaware; 16 Montana State; 20 Lamar Tech; 20 West Chester Teachers	Dropped: 11 Texas A&I; 13 Western Illinois; 14 Tennessee Tech; 15 Pittsburgh (KS); 16 Amherst; 20 Abilene Christian; 20 Tennessee A&I	Dropped: 15 Kent State; 17 East Texas State; 20 Northern Michigan	Dropped: 13 Western Michigan; 15 Muskingum; 19 Whitworth; 20 Arkansas State	Dropped: 14 Connecticut; 17 Louisville; 20 Tennessee Tech; 20 Buffalo	Dropped: 15 Montana State; 18 Idaho State; 19 Lehigh	Dropped: 16 Willamette; 18 Northern Michigan	Dropped: 17 Chattanooga; 19 Tennessee Tech; 20 Arkansas State	

== Associated Negro Press rankings ==
The Associated Negro Press ranked the top 1960 teams from historically black colleges and universities in an era when college football was often racially segregated.

The rankings were published on December 30:

- 1. Southern (9–1)
- 2. Florida A&M (9–1)
- 3. Grambling (9–1)
- 4. Prairie View A&M (10–1)
- 5. Tennessee A&I (7–3)
- 6. Maryland State (5–1–1)
- 7. North Carolina College (7–2)
- 8. North Carolina A&T (5–3–1)
- 9. Jackson State (6–4)
- 10. Arkansas AM&N (6–5)
- 11. Alabama A&M (7–2)
- 12. Albany State (7–0–2)
- 13. Allen (6–4)
- 14. Benedict (7–3)
- 15. Miles (5–4)
- 16. Winston-Salem State (6–3)
- 17. Virginia State (6–3)
- 18. Morehouse (5–3)
- 19. Alabama State (5–3)
- 20. Dillard (6–1–1)
- 21. Morgan State (6–3–1)
- 22. Johnson C. Smith (6–3)
- 23. Texas Southern (4–6)
- 24. Hampton (5–4)
- 25. Howard (4–4)
- 26. Virginia Union (4–5–1)
- 27. Livingstone (6–1–2)
