= 1960 college football season =

American college football season

- Preseason AP No. 1: Syracuse
- Regular season: September 17 – November 26, 1960
- Number of bowls: 9
- Bowl games: December 17, 1960 – January 2, 1961
- Champions: Minnesota (AP, Coaches, NFF); Ole Miss (FWAA); Missouri (Poling); Iowa (Litkenhous); Washington (Helms)
- Heisman: Navy halfback Joe Bellino

The 1960 college football season was the 92nd season of intercollegiate football in the United States. Five teams have a claim to the 1960 major college national championship:

- Minnesota (8–2) tied for the Big Ten championship and was ranked No. 1 in the final AP and UPI polls. Minnesota lost to Washington in the Rose Bowl, but the final polls were issued prior to the bowl games, leaving intact Minnesota's claim as AP and UPI national champion.
- Ole Miss (10–0–1) won the SEC championship and defeated Rice in the Sugar Bowl. After the bowl games, Ole Miss was selected by the Football Writers Association of America as national champion. Ole Miss has also been recognized as national champion by six other selectors, including the National Championship Foundation and College Football Researchers Association.
- Missouri lost their final game of the regular season 23-7 to rival Kansas on November 19, but on December 8 the Big Eight faculty committee ruled a Kansas player ineligible and ordered the Jayhawks to forfeit their last two victories. Missouri, therefore, officially ended the season 11–0 rather than 10–1 after defeating No. 5 Navy in the Orange Bowl. The Tigers were recognized by the Poling System as the national champion, and in August 2026 Mizzou Athletics announced that it would honor the team as national champions.
- Iowa (8–1) tied for the Big Ten championship, was ranked No. 2 in the final UPI poll, and was recognized as national champion in the Litkenhous Ratings.
- Washington (10–1) was ranked No. 5 in the final UPI poll. After the final polls, Washington defeated No. 1 Minnesota in the Rose Bowl and was declared national champion by the Helms Athletic Foundation.

Other major college teams compiling undefeated and untied records were Yale (9–0, AP No. 14) and New Mexico State (11–0, AP No. 17, top scoring offense [37.4 points per game]). At the small college level, Ohio (10–0) was recognized as the small college national champion by both the AP and UPI; Southern (9–1) was recognized as the black college national champion; and Lenoir Rhyne (11–0–1) defeated Humboldt State in the Holiday Bowl to win the NAIA national championship.

Navy halfback Joe Bellino won the Heisman Trophy and the Maxwell Award. Statistical leaders in major college football in 1960 included UCLA quarterback Billy Kilmer with 1,889 yards of total offense, Wake Forest quarterback Norm Snead with 1,676 passing yards, Washington State end Hugh Campbell with 66 receptions for 881 yards, and New Mexico State halfback Bob Gaiters with 1,338 rushing yards and 145 points scored.

== Conference and program changes ==
=== Conference changes ===
- After the Big Seven Conference, still officially known as the Missouri Valley Intercollegiate Athletic Association, added Oklahoma State, the conference's unofficial name became the Big Eight Conference. This name would remain until the league's dissolution in 1995.

=== Membership changes ===
School	1959 Conference	1960 Conference
Houston Cougars	Missouri Valley	Independent
Oklahoma State Cowboys	Independent	Big Eight
Texas Tech Red Raiders	Independent	Southwest

== Season chronology ==
=== September ===
In the preseason poll released on September 12, the defending champion Syracuse Orangemen and 1959's second-place finisher, the Mississippi Rebels, were No. 1 and No. 2, with 26 and 21 first place votes respectively. They were followed by the No. 3 Washington Huskies from Seattle, the No. 4 Texas Longhorns and the No. 5 Illinois Fighting Illini. As the regular season progressed, a new poll would be issued on the Monday following the weekend's games.

The Big Ten schools would not kick off until September 24. On September 17, No. 2 Mississippi beat the Houston Cougars in Houston, 42–0. No. 3 Washington crushed the visiting College of the Pacific, 55–6 (the school became the University of the Pacific in 1961). No. 4 Texas opened its season with a loss at home to Nebraska, falling 14–13. Ole Miss was voted No. 1, followed by No. 2 Syracuse, No. 3 Washington, and No. 4 Illinois. Previously unranked Alabama, which had beaten No. 13 Georgia 21–6 in Birmingham, was fifth.

September 24 No. 1 Mississippi beat Kentucky in Memphis, 21–6. No. 2 Syracuse opened its season with a 55–7 win over Boston University. No. 3 Washington won at home again, beating the University of Idaho Vandals 41–12. No. 4 Illinois beat Indiana 17–6. In Lincoln, Minnesota beat No. 12 Nebraska 26–14. No. 5 Alabama was tied 6–6 by Tulane in New Orleans. Mississippi, Syracuse, Washington, and Illinois remained as the top four in the next poll, but Kansas, which had crushed Kansas State 41–0 on the road, rose from No. 7 to No. 5. Minnesota entered the poll at the No. 18 spot.

=== October ===
October 1 No. 1 Mississippi played its second straight game in Memphis, Tennessee, beating Memphis State 31–20. No. 2 Syracuse defeated No. 5 Kansas in Lawrence, Kansas, 14–7, to reclaim the top spot. No. 3 Washington narrowly lost 15–14 at home to the No. 17 Navy Midshipmen. No. 4 Illinois beat West Virginia 33–0. No. 8 Iowa beat No. 6 Northwestern 42-0 on the road. No. 9 Ohio State shut out visiting USC 20-0. No. 18 Minnesota beat Indiana 42–0. The following poll featured No. 1 Syracuse and No. 2 Mississippi, followed by three Big Ten teams: No. 3 Iowa, No. 4 Illinois, and No. 5 Ohio State. Also from the Big Ten, Purdue was 7th, Michigan State 13th, and Minnesota 14th.

October 8 No. 1 Syracuse struggled to beat Holy Cross 15–6 in Worcester, Mass. No. 2 Mississippi won in their third consecutive trip to Tennessee, beating Vanderbilt 26–0 in Nashville. No. 3 Iowa beat No. 13 Michigan State in East Lansing, 27–15. No. 4 Illinois lost in Champaign, Ill., to No. 5 Ohio State, 34–7. No. 6 Navy, which had beaten SMU 26–7 at a game in the naval port of Norfolk, Virginia, came in at fifth. No. 14 Minnesota beat Northwestern 7–0. The next poll was: No. 1 Mississippi, No. 2 Iowa, No. 3 Ohio State, No. 4 Syracuse, and No. 5 Navy. Minnesota reached the Top Ten at No. 10.

On October 15, No. 1 Mississippi beat Tulane in New Orleans 26–13, and No. 2 Iowa beat No. 12 Wisconsin at home, 28–21. No. 3 Ohio State lost a close one at Purdue 24–21. No. 4 Syracuse beat No. 20 Penn State 21–15, and No. 5 Navy beat the Air Force Academy 35–3 in Baltimore. No. 6 Missouri reached 5–0 after a 45–0 win over Kansas State at Manhattan, KS. No. 10 Minnesota beat Illinois 21–10. The Iowa Hawkeyes narrowly topped the next poll, with 23 first place votes to 22 for Ole Miss, and only two points to separate No. 1 and No. 2 (442–440). They were followed by No. 3 Syracuse, No. 4 Navy, and No. 5 Missouri. Minnesota rose from 10th to 6th.

October 22 No. 1 Iowa beat No. 10 Purdue 21–14 and No. 2 Mississippi edged No. 14 Arkansas 10–7 in Little Rock. No. 3 Syracuse won at West Virginia 45–0, while No. 4 Navy beat the Ivy League's Pennsylvania in Philadelphia, 27–0. No. 5 Missouri, which had held all of its opponents to single digits, continued winning with a 34–8 thrashing of Iowa State. In Ann Arbor, Michigan, No. 6 Minnesota beat Michigan 10–0. Iowa tightened its hold on No. 1 in the next poll, with 34 of the 48 votes for first place. The next week's Top 20 had only nineteen teams, with Kansas at No. 19 with 2 points. The top five remained the same.

October 29 No. 1 Iowa beat No. 19 Kansas 21–7. No. 2 Mississippi played its 7th game of the season, but its first at home in Oxford, and was tied 6–6 by the LSU Tigers, the only team which had defeated them in 1959. No. 3 Syracuse lost to Pittsburgh 10–0. In Philadelphia, No. 4 Navy beat Notre Dame 14–7. No. 5 Missouri crushed Nebraska in Lincoln, 28–0, to go 7–0–0. At this time, they had outscored their opponents 210–31. No. 6 Minnesota beat Kansas State 48–7. No. 8 Ohio State defeated No. 10 Michigan State in East Lansing, 21–10. The next poll again featured three Big Ten teams in the top five: No. 1 Iowa, No. 2 Missouri, No. 3 Minnesota, No. 4 Navy, and No. 5 Ohio State.

=== November ===
November 5 The battle between the Big Ten's two 6–0–0 teams took place in Minneapolis, where No. 1 Iowa lost to No. 3 Minnesota, 27–10. No. 2 Missouri beat No. 18 Colorado at home 16–6. No. 4 Navy lost in Durham, North Carolina, to No. 13 Duke 19–10. No. 5 Ohio State handled Indiana 36–7. Having dethroned the No. 1 team, the Minnesota Gophers took the top spot in the poll released on November 7, 1960, with 40 of the 47 voters voting them as No. 1. No. 6 Mississippi, still unbeaten, returned to the Top Five after a 45–0 win over the University of Chattanooga. The top five was No. 1 Minnesota, No. 2 Missouri, No. 3 Ohio State, No. 4 Mississippi, and No. 5 Iowa.

November 12 No. 1 Minnesota lost to Purdue, 23–14. No. 2 Missouri gave up more than a touchdown for the first time, but still won 41–19 at Oklahoma. No. 3 Ohio State lost at No. 5 Iowa, 35–12. No. 4 Mississippi beat No. 14 Tennessee in Knoxville, 24–3. No. 6 Washington, which had beaten California 27–7, moved into the Top Five. The Missouri Tigers captured the top spot in the next poll, which was No. 1 Missouri, No. 2 Iowa, No. 3 Mississippi, No. 4 Minnesota, and No. 5 Washington.

November 19 Unbeaten No. 1 Missouri, with only a home game left between it and the national championship, lost to visiting Kansas, 23–7, but the game was later forfeited to Missouri due to the Jayhawks' use of an ineligible player. No. 2 Iowa defeated Notre Dame in South Bend, 28–0. No. 3 Mississippi was idle. No. 4 Minnesota closed its season with a 26–7 win at Wisconsin. They tied with Iowa atop the Big Ten standings and earned a Rose Bowl berth by virtue of their head-to-head victory over the Hawkeyes. Their opponent would be No. 5 Washington, which played its season ender against 4–4–1 Washington State in Spokane and won only by a 2–point conversion, 8–7. In the penultimate poll, released November 21, No. 1 Minnesota, No. 2 Iowa, and No. 3 Mississippi had 13½, 17½ and 13 first place votes respectively (voters were allowed to split their choices for No. 1), followed by No. 4 Washington and No. 5 Missouri.

November 26 No. 3 Mississippi finished its season unbeaten (9–0–1) with a 35–9 win at home over Mississippi State, earning the SEC title and a spot in the Sugar Bowl. All of the other Top Five teams had finished their schedules, but No. 7 Navy moved up in the final poll with a 17–12 victory against Army. The Midshipmen would face off against Missouri in the Orange Bowl.

With both the AP and UPI finishing their voting before the bowl games, the championship was determined in December. The AP writers divided among No. 1 Minnesota (8–1), No. 2 Mississippi (9–0–1), and No. 3 Iowa (8–1), and some voters split their choices. As such, the Minnesota Gophers received 17½ votes for No. 1, Mississippi got 16, and Iowa 12½. Minnesota had 433½ poll points, ahead of 411 for Ole Miss and 407½ for Iowa. The next tier of teams all had one loss and also were closely packed together: No. 4 Navy had 262 poll points, No. 5 Missouri had 253, and No. 6 Washington had 250. The UPI Coaches Poll placed the teams in a slightly different order, but also settled on Minnesota as the No. 1 choice.

Because the final Associated Press and United Press International polls were conducted after the final game of the regular season, Minnesota is considered the national champion for 1960 despite their loss to Washington in the Rose Bowl. After the bowl games, the Helms Athletic Foundation recognized Washington as national champion, while the Football Writers Association of America crowned Mississippi as national champion. Had the polls been taken after the bowl games, Missouri would likely also have been a contender for the national championship, as the Tigers beat Navy in the Orange Bowl and their 10–1 record was improved to 11–0 when the Kansas game was declared a forfeit.

The MAC's Ohio Bobcats were also crowned the world small college football champions in 1960, after an undefeated season.

=== December ===
December 8 The Big Eight faculty committee, meeting in Kansas City, ruled Kansas halfback Bert Coan ineligible and ordered the Jayhawks to forfeit their last two victories on November 12 and 19. The reversal brought Missouri's record to 11–0 instead of 10–1.

== Conference standings ==
=== Major conference standings ===
1960 Athletic Association of Western Universities football standings
	Conf.					Overall
Team	W		L		T	W		L		T
No. 6 Washington $	4	–	0	–	0	10	–	1	–	0
USC	3	–	1	–	0	4	–	6	–	0
UCLA	2	–	2	–	0	7	–	2	–	1
California	1	–	3	–	0	2	–	7	–	1
Stanford	0	–	4	–	0	0	–	10	–	0
$ – Conference champion; Rankings from AP poll

1960 Atlantic Coast Conference football standings
	Conf.					Overall
Team	W		L		T	W		L		T
No. 10 Duke $	5	–	1	–	0	8	–	3	–	0
NC State	4	–	1	–	1	6	–	3	–	1
Maryland	5	–	2	–	0	6	–	4	–	0
Clemson	4	–	2	–	0	6	–	4	–	0
South Carolina	3	–	3	–	1	3	–	6	–	1
North Carolina	2	–	5	–	0	3	–	7	–	0
Wake Forest	2	–	5	–	0	2	–	8	–	0
Virginia	0	–	6	–	0	0	–	10	–	0
$ – Conference champion; Rankings from AP poll

1960 Big Eight Conference football standings
	Conf.					Overall
Team	W		L		T	W		L		T
No. 5 Missouri $	7	–	0	–	0	11	–	0	–	0
No. 11 Kansas†	6	–	0	–	1	7	–	2	–	1
Colorado	6	–	1	–	0	7	–	3	–	0
Iowa State	4	–	3	–	0	7	–	3	–	0
Oklahoma	2	–	4	–	1	3	–	6	–	1
Nebraska	2	–	5	–	0	4	–	6	–	0
Oklahoma State	2	–	5	–	0	3	–	7	–	0
Kansas State	0	–	7	–	0	1	–	9	–	0
$ – Conference champion; † Kansas' conference victories against Colorado and Missouri were forfeited by Big Eight sanctions, though both are recognized as Kansas victories by Kansas and the NCAA.; Rankings from AP Poll

1960 Big Ten Conference football standings
	Conf.					Overall
Team	W		L		T	W		L		T
No. 1 Minnesota +	6	–	1	–	0	8	–	2	–	0
No. 3 Iowa +	5	–	1	–	0	8	–	1	–	0
No. 8 Ohio State	5	–	2	–	0	7	–	2	–	0
No. 15 Michigan State	4	–	2	–	0	6	–	2	–	1
Illinois	3	–	4	–	0	5	–	4	–	0
Michigan	3	–	4	–	0	5	–	4	–	0
Northwestern	3	–	4	–	0	5	–	4	–	0
No. 19 Purdue	3	–	4	–	0	4	–	4	–	1
Wisconsin	2	–	5	–	0	4	–	5	–	0
Indiana	0	–	7	–	0	1	–	8	–	0
+ – Conference co-champions; Rankings from AP Poll

1960 Border Conference football standings
	Conf.					Overall
Team	W		L		T	W		L		T
No. 17 New Mexico State $	4	–	0	–	0	11	–	0	–	0
Arizona	3	–	0	–	0	7	–	3	–	0
Arizona State	3	–	2	–	0	7	–	3	–	0
Texas Western	2	–	3	–	0	4	–	5	–	1
West Texas State	1	–	4	–	0	3	–	7	–	0
Hardin–Simmons	0	–	4	–	0	0	–	10	–	0
Rankings from AP Poll

1960 Ivy League football standings
	Conf.					Overall
Team	W		L		T	W		L		T
No. 14 Yale $	7	–	0	–	0	9	–	0	–	0
Princeton	6	–	1	–	0	7	–	2	–	0
Dartmouth	4	–	3	–	0	5	–	4	–	0
Harvard	4	–	3	–	0	5	–	4	–	0
Columbia	3	–	4	–	0	3	–	6	–	0
Penn	2	–	5	–	0	3	–	6	–	0
Brown	1	–	6	–	0	3	–	6	–	0
Cornell	1	–	6	–	0	2	–	7	–	0
$ – Conference champion; Rankings from AP poll

1960 Missouri Valley Conference football standings
	Conf.					Overall
Team	W		L		T	W		L		T
Wichita $	3	–	0	–	0	8	–	2	–	0
Tulsa	2	–	1	–	0	5	–	5	–	0
Cincinnati	1	–	2	–	0	4	–	6	–	0
North Texas State	0	–	3	–	0	2	–	6	–	1
$ – Conference champion

1960 Skyline Conference football standings
	Conf.					Overall
Team	W		L		T	W		L		T
Utah State +	6	–	1	–	0	9	–	2	–	0
Wyoming +	6	–	1	–	0	8	–	2	–	0
Utah	5	–	1	–	0	7	–	3	–	0
New Mexico	4	–	2	–	0	5	–	5	–	0
Montana	2	–	5	–	0	5	–	5	–	0
BYU	2	–	5	–	0	3	–	8	–	0
Denver	1	–	6	–	0	3	–	7	–	0
Colorado State	1	–	6	–	0	2	–	8	–	0
+ – Conference co-champions

1960 Southeastern Conference football standings
	Conf.					Overall
Team	W		L		T	W		L		T
No. 2 Ole Miss $	5	–	0	–	1	10	–	0	–	1
No. 18 Florida	5	–	1	–	0	9	–	2	–	0
No. 9 Alabama	5	–	1	–	1	8	–	1	–	2
No. 13 Auburn	5	–	2	–	0	8	–	2	–	0
Tennessee	3	–	2	–	2	6	–	2	–	2
Georgia	4	–	3	–	0	6	–	4	–	0
Georgia Tech	4	–	4	–	0	5	–	5	–	0
LSU	2	–	3	–	1	5	–	4	–	1
Kentucky	2	–	4	–	1	5	–	4	–	1
Tulane	1	–	4	–	1	3	–	6	–	1
Mississippi State	0	–	5	–	1	2	–	6	–	1
Vanderbilt	0	–	7	–	0	3	–	7	–	0
$ – Conference champion; Rankings from AP Poll

1960 Southern Conference football standings
	Conf.					Overall
Team	W		L		T	W		L		T
VMI $	4	–	1	–	0	7	–	2	–	1
The Citadel	4	–	2	–	0	8	–	2	–	1
George Washington	4	–	2	–	0	5	–	3	–	1
Virginia Tech	4	–	2	–	0	6	–	4	–	0
Furman	2	–	2	–	0	5	–	4	–	1
Richmond	3	–	4	–	1	3	–	6	–	1
Davidson	1	–	3	–	0	3	–	5	–	0
William & Mary	1	–	5	–	0	2	–	8	–	0
West Virginia	0	–	2	–	1	0	–	8	–	2
$ – Conference champion

1960 Southwest Conference football standings
	Conf.					Overall
Team	W		L		T	W		L		T
No. 7 Arkansas $	6	–	1	–	0	8	–	3	–	0
No. 12 Baylor	5	–	2	–	0	8	–	3	–	0
Texas	5	–	2	–	0	7	–	3	–	1
Rice	5	–	2	–	0	7	–	4	–	0
TCU	3	–	3	–	1	4	–	4	–	2
Texas Tech	1	–	5	–	1	3	–	6	–	1
Texas A&M	0	–	4	–	3	1	–	6	–	3
SMU	0	–	6	–	1	0	–	9	–	1
$ – Conference champion; Rankings from AP Poll

=== Major independents ===
1960 Eastern major college football independents records
	Conf.			Overall
Team	W	L	T	W		L		T
No. 19 Syracuse		–		7	–	2	–	0
No. 16 Penn State		–		7	–	3	–	0
Army		–		6	–	3	–	1
Holy Cross		–		6	–	4	–	0
Pittsburgh		–		4	–	3	–	3
Boston University		–		3	–	5	–	2
Boston College		–		3	–	6	–	1
Colgate		–		2	–	7	–	0
Villanova		–		2	–	8	–	0
Rankings from AP poll

1960 Midwestern major college football independents records
	Conf.			Overall
Team	W	L	T	W		L		T
Detroit		–		7	–	2	–	0
Xavier		–		5	–	5	–	0
Marquette		–		3	–	6	–	0
Notre Dame		–		2	–	8	–	0
Dayton		–		1	–	9	–	0

1960 Southern major college football independents records
	Conf.			Overall
Team	W	L	T	W		L		T
No. 4 Navy		–		9	–	2	–	0
Memphis State		–		8	–	2	–	0
Houston		–		6	–	4	–	0
Miami (FL)		–		6	–	4	–	0
Florida State		–		3	–	6	–	1
Rankings from AP poll

1960 Western major college football independents records
	Conf.			Overall
Team	W	L	T	W		L		T
Oregon		–		7	–	3	–	1
Oregon State		–		6	–	3	–	1
San Jose State		–		5	–	4	–	0
Washington State		–		4	–	5	–	1
Air Force		–		4	–	6	–	0
Pacific (CA)		–		4	–	6	–	0
Idaho		–		1	–	9	–	0

=== Minor conference standings ===
1960 California Collegiate Athletic Association football standings
	Conf.					Overall
Team	W		L		T	W		L		T
No. 9 Fresno State $	5	–	0	–	0	9	–	1	–	0
Long Beach State	3	–	1	–	1	5	–	3	–	1
Los Angeles State	3	–	1	–	1	4	–	3	–	1
UC Santa Barbara	2	–	3	–	0	2	–	5	–	1
Cal Poly	1	–	4	–	0	1	–	5	–	0
San Diego State	0	–	5	–	0	1	–	6	–	1
$ – Conference champion; Cal Poly forfeited cancelled conference games to Los Angeles State and UC Santa Barbara, but this forfeit did not affect overall records of the teams.; Rankings from UPI small college poll

1960 Central Intercollegiate Athletic Association football standings
	Conf.					Overall
Team	W		L		T	W		L		T
Maryland State $	5	–	0	–	1	5	–	1	–	1
North Carolina A&T	4	–	1	–	1	5	–	3	–	1
North Carolina College	5	–	2	–	0	7	–	2	–	0
Winston-Salem State	5	–	1	–	0	6	–	2	–	0
Hampton	5	–	2	–	0	5	–	4	–	0
Virginia State	5	–	3	–	0	6	–	3	–	0
Johnson C. Smith	6	–	2	–	0	6	–	3	–	0
Morgan State	3	–	3	–	1	3	–	3	–	1
Delaware State	4	–	3	–	0	4	–	4	–	0
Virginia Union	3	–	4	–	1	4	–	5	–	1
St. Augustine's	4	–	4	–	0	4	–	5	–	0
Fayetteville State	2	–	4	–	0	3	–	5	–	0
Howard	2	–	4	–	0	4	–	4	–	0
Shaw	3	–	5	–	0	3	–	6	–	0
Saint Paul's (VA)	1	–	6	–	0	1	–	7	–	0
Elizabeth City State	1	–	7	–	0	1	–	8	–	0
Lincoln (PA)	0	–	6	–	0	0	–	7	–	0
$ – Conference champion; Conference standings were based on the Dickinson System.

1960 Central Intercollegiate Conference football standings
	Conf.					Overall
Team	W		L		T	W		L		T
No. 19 St. Benedict's $	5	–	0	–	0	7	–	1	–	0
No. 14 Pittsburg State	4	–	1	–	0	8	–	1	–	0
Emporia State	2	–	3	–	0	3	–	5	–	0
Washburn	2	–	3	–	0	3	–	6	–	0
Fort Hays State	1	–	4	–	0	2	–	7	–	0
Omaha	1	–	4	–	0	1	–	7	–	1
$ – Conference champion; Rankings from NAIA poll

1960 College Conference of Illinois football standings
	Conf.					Overall
Team	W		L		T	W		L		T
North Central (IL) $	4	–	1	–	0	7	–	2	–	0
Illinois Wesleyan	3	–	2	–	0	7	–	2	–	0
Millikin	3	–	2	–	0	6	–	2	–	0
Carroll (WI)	1	–	2	–	2	2	–	5	–	2
Lake Forest	1	–	3	–	1	4	–	3	–	1
Augustana (IL)	1	–	3	–	1	3	–	4	–	2
$ – Conference champion

1960 Eastern Intercollegiate Athletic Conference football standings
	Conf.					Overall
Team	W		L		T	W		L		T
South Carolina Trade +	5	–	0	–	1	6	–	1	–	1
Livingstone +	5	–	0	–	1	7	–	2	–	2
Norfolk State	4	–	2	–	0	6	–	3	–	0
Friendship	2	–	4	–	0	?	–	?	–	?
Kittrell	2	–	4	–	0	?	–	?	–	?
Voorhees	2	–	4	–	0	?	–	?	–	?
Morristown	0	–	6	–	0	?	–	?	–	?
+ – Conference co-champions

1960 Far Western Conference football standings
	Conf.					Overall
Team	W		L		T	W		L		T
No. 2/3 Humboldt State $	5	–	0	–	0	11	–	1	–	0
San Francisco State	4	–	1	–	0	9	–	1	–	0
Chico State	2	–	3	–	0	6	–	4	–	0
Sacramento State	2	–	3	–	0	5	–	5	–	0
Nevada	2	–	3	–	0	3	–	6	–	0
UC Davis	0	–	5	–	0	0	–	8	–	1
$ – Conference champion; Rankings from NAIA poll and AP small college poll

1960 Gulf States Conference football standings
	Conf.					Overall
Team	W		L		T	W		L		T
No. 5 Southeastern Louisiana +	4	–	1	–	0	9	–	1	–	0
No. 12 Louisiana Tech +	4	–	1	–	0	8	–	2	–	0
McNeese State	3	–	2	–	0	7	–	3	–	0
Southwestern Louisiana	3	–	2	–	0	6	–	4	–	0
Northeast Louisiana State	1	–	4	–	0	3	–	7	–	0
Northwestern State	0	–	5	–	0	3	–	6	–	0
+ – Conference co-champions; Rankings from NAIA poll

1960 Hoosier Conference football standings
	Conf.					Overall
Team	W		L		T	W		L		T
Indiana Central $	4	–	1	–	0	6	–	3	–	0
Anderson (IN)	3	–	2	–	0	6	–	2	–	0
Franklin (IN)	3	–	2	–	0	5	–	4	–	0
Manchester (IN)	2	–	2	–	0	3	–	5	–	0
Hanover	2	–	2	–	0	2	–	6	–	0
Taylor	0	–	5	–	0	2	–	7	–	0
+ – Conference co-champions

1960 Indiana Collegiate Conference football standings
	Conf.					Overall
Team	W		L		T	W		L		T
Butler $	5	–	1	–	0	7	–	1	–	0
Evansville	4	–	2	–	0	5	–	3	–	0
Saint Joseph's (IN)	3	–	2	–	1	3	–	4	–	1
Indiana State	3	–	3	–	0	3	–	4	–	0
Ball State	2	–	4	–	0	3	–	5	–	0
Valparaiso	2	–	4	–	0	3	–	6	–	0
DePauw	1	–	4	–	1	2	–	5	–	1
$ – Conference champion

1960 Interstate Intercollegiate Athletic Conference football standings
	Conf.					Overall
Team	W		L		T	W		L		T
No. 13 Southern Illinois $	6	–	0	–	0	8	–	2	–	0
Western Illinois	5	–	1	–	0	6	–	2	–	0
Northern Illinois	4	–	2	–	0	7	–	2	–	0
Central Michigan	3	–	3	–	0	3	–	5	–	0
Illinois State Normal	1	–	4	–	1	2	–	6	–	1
Eastern Illinois	1	–	5	–	0	2	–	7	–	0
Eastern Michigan	0	–	5	–	1	0	–	8	–	1
$ – Conference champion; Rankings from NAIA poll

1960 Iowa Conference football standings
	Conf.					Overall
Team	W		L		T	W		L		T
No. 17 Parsons +	7	–	1	–	0	8	–	1	–	0
Luther +	7	–	1	–	0	8	–	1	–	0
Wartburg	6	–	2	–	0	7	–	2	–	0
Upper Iowa	5	–	3	–	0	5	–	5	–	0
Dubuque	4	–	4	–	0	4	–	4	–	0
Buena Vista	3	–	5	–	0	4	–	5	–	0
Central (IA)	3	–	5	–	0	3	–	6	–	0
Iowa Wesleyan	1	–	7	–	0	1	–	8	–	1
Simpson (IA)	0	–	8	–	0	0	–	9	–	0
+ – Conference co-champions; Rankings from NAIA poll

1960 Lone Star Conference football standings
	Conf.					Overall
Team	W		L		T	W		L		T
No. 3 Texas A&I $	6	–	1	–	0	8	–	1	–	1
East Texas State	5	–	2	–	0	6	–	4	–	0
Lamar Tech	5	–	2	–	0	8	–	4	–	0
Howard Payne	4	–	3	–	0	6	–	4	–	0
Sul Ross	4	–	3	–	0	7	–	3	–	0
Sam Houston State	2	–	5	–	0	3	–	6	–	0
Southwest Texas State	1	–	6	–	0	2	–	8	–	0
Stephen F. Austin	1	–	6	–	0	1	–	10	–	0
$ – Conference champion; Rankings from NAIA poll

1960 Mason–Dixon Conference football standings
	Conf.					Overall
Team	W		L		T	W		L		T
Western Maryland +	3	–	1	–	0	6	–	3	–	0
Randolph–Macon +	3	–	1	–	0	4	–	4	–	0
Hampden–Sydney	2	–	1	–	0	2	–	6	–	0
Gallaudet	1	–	0	–	0	2	–	6	–	0
Johns Hopkins	0	–	2	–	0	5	–	2	–	1
Bridgewater	0	–	4	–	0	0	–	7	–	0
+ – Conference co-champions; Conference standings were based on the Dickinson Scoring System; Gallaudet did not play enough conference games to be eligible for title.

1960 Michigan Intercollegiate Athletic Association football standings
	Conf.					Overall
Team	W		L		T	W		L		T
Albion $	5	–	0	–	0	7	–	1	–	0
Hope	4	–	1	–	0	5	–	4	–	0
Adrian	3	–	2	–	0	4	–	3	–	1
Kalamazoo	2	–	3	–	0	4	–	5	–	0
Olivet	1	–	4	–	0	3	–	5	–	0
Alma	0	–	5	–	0	2	–	7	–	0
$ – Conference champion

1960 Mid-American Conference football standings
	Conf.					Overall
Team	W		L		T	W		L		T
No. 1 Ohio $	6	–	0	–	0	10	–	0	–	0
No. 6 Bowling Green	5	–	1	–	0	8	–	1	–	0
Kent State	4	–	2	–	0	6	–	3	–	0
Miami (OH)	2	–	3	–	0	5	–	5	–	0
Western Michigan	2	–	4	–	0	4	–	4	–	1
Marshall	1	–	4	–	0	2	–	7	–	1
Toledo	0	–	6	–	0	2	–	7	–	0
$ – Conference champion; Rankings from AP small college poll

1960 Mid-Ohio League football standings
	Conf.					Overall
Team	W		L		T	W		L		T
Ohio Northern +	4	–	1	–	0	7	–	2	–	0
Ashland +	4	–	1	–	0	6	–	3	–	0
Bluffton +	4	–	1	–	0	5	–	3	–	1
Findlay	2	–	3	–	0	2	–	7	–	0
Defiance	1	–	4	–	0	1	–	7	–	1
Wilmington (OH)	0	–	5	–	0	0	–	8	–	0
+ – Conference co-champions

1960 Middle Atlantic Conference football standings
	Conf.					Overall
Team	W		L		T	W		L		T
University Division
Rutgers x	4	–	0	–	0	8	–	1	–	0
Bucknell	5	–	1	–	0	7	–	2	–	0
Lehigh	3	–	2	–	0	4	–	5	–	0
Lafayette	4	–	3	–	0	5	–	4	–	0
Gettysburg	2	–	3	–	0	3	–	6	–	0
Delaware	1	–	4	–	0	2	–	6	–	1
Temple	0	–	5	–	0	2	–	7	–	0
Muhlenberg *	1	–	2	–	0	6	–	3	–	0
Northern College Division
Albright x	6	–	0	–	0	9	–	0	–	0
Wagner x	6	–	0	–	0	9	–	0	–	0
Lebanon Valley	6	–	1	–	0	7	–	2	–	0
Susquehanna	5	–	1	–	0	7	–	1	–	0
Juniata	4	–	1	–	0	5	–	2	–	0
Scranton	3	–	3	–	0	4	–	4	–	0
Upsala	1	–	3	–	1	1	–	5	–	2
Wilkes	2	–	7	–	0	2	–	7	–	0
Moravian	1	–	5	–	1	1	–	6	–	1
Hofstra *	2	–	0	–	0	7	–	1	–	1
Lycoming *	1	–	3	–	0	3	–	5	–	0
Southern College Division
Johns Hopkins x	5	–	1	–	0	5	–	2	–	1
Pennsylvania Military	5	–	3	–	0	5	–	4	–	0
Western Maryland	3	–	2	–	0	6	–	3	–	0
Ursinus	3	–	3	–	0	3	–	4	–	0
Swarthmore	2	–	3	–	0	2	–	5	–	0
Dickinson	1	–	6	–	0	1	–	7	–	0
Drexel	0	–	6	–	0	0	–	7	–	1
Haverford	0	–	7	–	0	0	–	7	–	0
Franklin & Marshall *	1	–	2	–	0	2	–	6	–	0
No. 5 West Chester *	0	–	0	–	0	9	–	0	–	0
x – Division champion/co-champions; * – Ineligible for championship due to insufficient conference games; Rankings from AP Poll

1960 Midwest Athletic Association football standings
	Conf.					Overall
Team	W		L		T	W		L		T
No. 5 Tennessee A&I $	3	–	0	–	0	7	–	3	–	0
Lincoln (MO)	2	–	1	–	0	3	–	5	–	0
Central State (OH)	1	–	2	–	0	7	–	2	–	0
Kentucky State	0	–	3	–	0	2	–	8	–	0
$ – Conference champion; Rankings from Associated Negro Press

1960 Midwest Conference football standings
	Conf.					Overall
Team	W		L		T	W		L		T
St. Olaf $	6	–	2	–	0	6	–	2	–	0
Coe	5	–	2	–	1	5	–	2	–	1
Cornell (IA)	5	–	2	–	1	5	–	2	–	1
Carleton	5	–	3	–	0	5	–	3	–	0
Grinnell	4	–	4	–	0	4	–	4	–	0
Monmouth (IL)	3	–	4	–	1	3	–	4	–	1
Ripon	3	–	4	–	1	3	–	4	–	1
Knox	2	–	4	–	2	2	–	4	–	2
Lawrence	3	–	5	–	0	3	–	5	–	0
Beloit	1	–	7	–	0	1	–	7	–	0
$ – Conference champion

1960 Minnesota Intercollegiate Athletic Conference football standings
	Conf.					Overall
Team	W		L		T	W		L		T
Minnesota–Duluth $	6	–	1	–	0	6	–	1	–	1
Concordia (MN)	5	–	2	–	0	7	–	2	–	0
Macalester	5	–	2	–	0	7	–	2	–	0
Augsburg	4	–	3	–	0	5	–	3	–	0
Saint John's (MN)	3	–	3	–	1	4	–	3	–	1
Gustavus Adolphus	3	–	3	–	1	3	–	5	–	1
St. Thomas (MN)	1	–	6	–	0	2	–	6	–	0
Hamline	0	–	7	–	0	0	–	8	–	0
$ – Conference champion

1960 Missouri Intercollegiate Athletic Association football standings
	Conf.					Overall
Team	W		L		T	W		L		T
NE Missouri State $	5	–	0	–	0	8	–	1	–	0
SE Missouri State	4	–	1	–	0	6	–	4	–	0
NW Missouri State	3	–	2	–	0	5	–	4	–	0
SW Missouri State	2	–	3	–	0	2	–	7	–	0
Central Missouri State	1	–	4	–	0	4	–	5	–	0
Missouri–Rolla	0	–	5	–	0	0	–	9	–	0
$ – Conference champion

1960 North Central Conference football standings
	Conf.					Overall
Team	W		L		T	W		L		T
Iowa State Teachers $	6	–	0	–	0	9	–	1	–	0
Augustana (SD)	4	–	2	–	0	6	–	2	–	0
North Dakota	4	–	2	–	0	4	–	3	–	1
South Dakota State	2	–	3	–	1	5	–	4	–	1
North Dakota State	2	–	3	–	1	3	–	5	–	1
Morningside	2	–	4	–	0	4	–	5	–	0
South Dakota	0	–	6	–	0	1	–	8	–	0
$ – Conference champion

1960 Northern State College Conference football standings
	Conf.					Overall
Team	W		L		T	W		L		T
Mankato State $	4	–	0	–	1	5	–	3	–	1
Michigan Tech	4	–	1	–	0	5	–	3	–	0
St. Cloud State	2	–	3	–	0	3	–	5	–	0
Bemidji State	2	–	3	–	0	2	–	6	–	0
Winona State	1	–	3	–	1	4	–	3	–	1
Moorhead State	1	–	4	–	0	2	–	7	–	0
$ – Conference champion

1960 Ohio Athletic Conference football standings
	Conf.					Overall
Team	W		L		T	W		L		T
No. 9 Muskingum $	7	–	0	–	0	9	–	0	–	0
Ohio Wesleyan	6	–	1	–	0	7	–	2	–	0
Otterbein	5	–	1	–	0	8	–	1	–	0
Wittenberg	5	–	1	–	0	8	–	1	–	0
Wooster	5	–	3	–	0	6	–	3	–	0
Denison	4	–	3	–	0	6	–	3	–	0
Marietta	4	–	3	–	0	6	–	3	–	0
Heidelberg	3	–	3	–	0	5	–	4	–	0
Mount Union	3	–	5	–	0	3	–	6	–	0
Oberlin	2	–	4	–	0	4	–	4	–	0
Capital	2	–	6	–	0	2	–	6	–	0
Kenyon	1	–	6	–	0	2	–	6	–	0
Akron	1	–	6	–	0	1	–	8	–	0
Hiram	0	–	6	–	0	0	–	7	–	1
$ – Conference champion; Rankings from AP small college poll

1960 Ohio Valley Conference football standings
	Conf.					Overall
Team	W		L		T	W		L		T
Tennessee Tech $	6	–	0	–	0	8	–	2	–	0
Middle Tennessee	4	–	2	–	0	5	–	5	–	0
Murray State	4	–	2	–	0	5	–	5	–	0
Morehead State	2	–	4	–	0	5	–	4	–	0
East Tennessee State	1	–	3	–	2	3	–	4	–	2
Eastern Kentucky	1	–	4	–	1	3	–	6	–	1
Western Kentucky	1	–	4	–	1	2	–	6	–	1
$ – Conference champion

1960 Pennsylvania State College Conference football standings
	Conf.					Overall
Team	W		L		T	W		L		T
East Division
No. 8/5 West Chester xy$	5	–	0	–	0	9	–	0	–	0
Millersville	4	–	1	–	0	6	–	3	–	0
Bloomsburg	4	–	2	–	0	5	–	2	–	1
East Stroudsburg	5	–	3	–	0	6	–	3	–	0
Mansfield	2	–	5	–	0	3	–	5	–	0
Kutztown	1	–	5	–	0	1	–	7	–	0
Cheyney	0	–	5	–	0	0	–	7	–	0
West Division
Lock Haven xy	6	–	1	–	0	8	–	2	–	0
California (PA)	5	–	1	–	0	7	–	1	–	0
Slippery Rock	2	–	1	–	2	5	–	1	–	2
Clarion	2	–	4	–	1	3	–	4	–	1
Indiana (PA)	1	–	3	–	2	2	–	4	–	2
Edinboro	1	–	3	–	1	3	–	4	–	1
Shippensburg	2	–	6	–	0	2	–	7	–	0
Championship: West Chester 35, Lock Haven 6
$ – Conference champion; x – Division champion/co-champions; y – Championship game participant; Interdivisional games counted in conference standings.; Rankings from NAIA poll and AP small college poll

1960 Prairie College Conference football standings
	Conf.					Overall
Team	W		L		T	W		L		T
Principia $	2	–	0	–	0	5	–	3	–	0
Illinois College	1	–	1	–	0	5	–	3	–	0
Rose Poly	0	–	2	–	0	1	–	5	–	1
$ – Conference champion

1960 Presidents' Athletic Conference football standings
	Conf.					Overall
Team	W		L		T	W		L		T
Western Reserve $	6	–	0	–	0	6	–	1	–	0
Thiel	4	–	1	–	0	4	–	2	–	1
John Carroll	3	–	2	–	0	3	–	4	–	0
Wayne State (MI)	3	–	2	–	0	4	–	3	–	0
Allegheny	3	–	3	–	0	3	–	3	–	1
Washington & Jefferson	1	–	4	–	0	1	–	6	–	0
Case Tech	1	–	5	–	0	1	–	5	–	1
Bethany (WV)	1	–	5	–	0	1	–	6	–	0
$ – Conference champion

1960 Rocky Mountain Conference football standings
	Conf.					Overall
Team	W		L		T	W		L		T
No. 16 Adams State $	4	–	0	–	0	7	–	0	–	1
Idaho State	3	–	1	–	0	6	–	2	–	0
Colorado Mines	3	–	2	–	0	6	–	3	–	0
Colorado State–Greeley	2	–	2	–	1	6	–	3	–	1
Colorado College	1	–	4	–	0	4	–	5	–	0
Western State (CO)	0	–	4	–	1	1	–	7	–	1
$ – Conference champion; Rankings from NAIA poll

1960 Southeastern Athletic Conference football standings
	Conf.					Overall
Team	W		L		T	W		L		T
Albany State +	3	–	0	–	1	7	–	0	–	2
Claflin +	3	–	0	–	1	4	–	4	–	1
Savannah State	2	–	2	–	0	3	–	5	–	1
Morris	1	–	3	–	0	2	–	6	–	1
Paine	0	–	4	–	0	1	–	7	–	0
+ – Conference co-champions

1960 Southern California Intercollegiate Athletic Conference football standings
	Conf.					Overall
Team	W		L		T	W		L		T
Whittier +	4	–	1	–	0	8	–	2	–	0
Redlands +	4	–	1	–	0	6	–	3	–	1
Occidental +	4	–	1	–	0	5	–	3	–	0
Claremont-Mudd	2	–	3	–	0	4	–	5	–	0
Pomona	1	–	4	–	0	3	–	7	–	0
Caltech	0	–	5	–	0	0	–	8	–	0
+ – Conference co-champions

1960 Southern Intercollegiate Athletic Conference football standings
	Conf.					Overall
Team	W		L		T	W		L		T
No. 6 Florida A&M $	5	–	0	–	0	9	–	1	–	0
Alabama A&M	5	–	0	–	0	7	–	1	–	0
Benedict	6	–	2	–	0	7	–	3	–	0
Morehouse	4	–	2	–	0	5	–	3	–	0
Allen	4	–	2	–	0	6	–	4	–	0
Tuskegee	5	–	2	–	0	7	–	2	–	0
Alabama State	3	–	3	–	0	5	–	3	–	0
Bethune–Cookman	2	–	3	–	0	3	–	4	–	0
Fort Valley State	1	–	3	–	2	1	–	5	–	3
Morris Brown	3	–	4	–	0	4	–	6	–	0
Clark (GA)	1	–	3	–	1	2	–	5	–	1
Lane	1	–	4	–	0	1	–	5	–	1
Knoxville	1	–	5	–	0	1	–	6	–	0
Fisk	1	–	5	–	0	1	–	8	–	0
South Carolina State	0	–	5	–	1	1	–	7	–	1
Miles	2	–	1	–	0	4	–	2	–	0
$ – Conference champion; Standings were based on Dickinson System ratings.

1960 Southwestern Athletic Conference football standings
	Conf.					Overall
Team	W		L		T	W		L		T
Prairie View A&M +	6	–	1	–	0	10	–	1	–	0
Grambling +	6	–	1	–	0	9	–	1	–	0
No. 7 Southern +	6	–	1	–	0	9	–	1	–	0
Jackson State	4	–	3	–	0	6	–	4	–	0
Arkansas AM&N	3	–	4	–	0	6	–	4	–	0
Texas Southern	2	–	5	–	0	4	–	6	–	0
Wiley	1	–	6	–	0	2	–	7	–	0
Texas College	0	–	7	–	0	1	–	9	–	0
+ – Conference co-champions; Rankings from NAIA poll

1960 Virginia Little Eight Conference football standings
	Conf.					Overall
Team	W		L		T	W		L		T
Randolph–Macon $	2	–	0	–	0	4	–	4	–	0
Emory and Henry	1	–	0	–	0	7	–	2	–	1
Hampden–Sydney	1	–	2	–	0	2	–	6	–	0
Bridgewater	0	–	2	–	0	0	–	7	–	0
$ – Conference champion

1960 West Penn Conference football standings
	Conf.					Overall
Team	W		L		T	W		L		T
Westminster (PA) $	5	–	0	–	0	5	–	3	–	0
Saint Vincent	4	–	1	–	0	4	–	3	–	1
Carnegie Tech	3	–	2	–	0	3	–	5	–	0
Geneva	1	–	3	–	0	4	–	5	–	0
Grove City	0	–	3	–	1	2	–	4	–	3
Waynesburg	0	–	4	–	1	0	–	8	–	1
$ – Conference champion

1960 Wisconsin State College Conference football standings
	Conf.					Overall
Team	W		L		T	W		L		T
No. 18 Whitewater State $	6	–	0	–	0	7	–	0	–	1
La Crosse State	4	–	2	–	0	5	–	4	–	0
Stout State	4	–	2	–	0	4	–	4	–	0
Stevens Point State	4	–	3	–	0	5	–	3	–	0
Eau Claire State	4	–	3	–	1	4	–	4	–	1
Oshkosh State	3	–	4	–	0	3	–	4	–	0
Milwaukee	2	–	4	–	0	2	–	6	–	0
Superior State	1	–	4	–	1	2	–	5	–	2
River Falls State	1	–	4	–	1	2	–	6	–	1
Platteville State	1	–	4	–	1	1	–	5	–	1
$ – Conference champion; Rankings from NAIA poll

1960 Yankee Conference football standings
	Conf.					Overall
Team	W		L		T	W		L		T
Connecticut +	3	–	1	–	0	5	–	4	–	0
UMass +	3	–	1	–	0	7	–	2	–	0
Maine	3	–	2	–	0	4	–	3	–	1
New Hampshire	2	–	2	–	0	4	–	3	–	0
Rhode Island	1	–	4	–	0	3	–	5	–	0
Vermont	0	–	2	–	0	1	–	6	–	0
+ – Conference co-champions

=== Non-major independents ===
1960 Eastern non-major college football independents records
	Conf.			Overall
Team	W	L	T	W		L		T
Montclair State		–		8	–	0	–	0
Southern Connecticut State		–		7	–	3	–	0
Buffalo		–		4	–	6	–	0
Carnegie Tech		–		3	–	5	–	0
Northeastern		–		2	–	5	–	1
Union (NY)		–		2	–	5	–	1

1960 Midwestern non-major college football independents records
	Conf.			Overall
Team	W	L	T	W		L		T
Northern Michigan		–		8	–	1	–	1
Baldwin–Wallace		–		4	–	3	–	1
Carthage		–		5	–	4	–	0
St. Norbert		–		4	–	4	–	1
Drake		–		4	–	5	–	0
North Park		–		4	–	5	–	0
Washington University		–		2	–	7	–	0
Rose Poly		–		1	–	5	–	1
Wabash		–		1	–	8	–	0

1960 Southern non-major college football independents records
	Conf.			Overall
Team	W	L	T	W		L		T
Washington and Lee		–		8	–	0	–	1
Arlington State		–		9	–	2	–	0
Howard (AL)		–		8	–	1	–	0
Louisville		–		7	–	2	–	0
Mississippi Southern		–		6	–	4	–	0
Sewanee		–		4	–	3	–	1
Abilene Christian		–		5	–	5	–	0
Chattanooga		–		5	–	5	–	0
Arkansas State		–		4	–	5	–	0
Tampa		–		2	–	7	–	1
Trinity (TX)		–		2	–	7	–	1

1960 Western non-major college football independents records
	Conf.			Overall
Team	W	L	T	W		L		T
UC Riverside		–		7	–	0	–	1
Cal Poly Pomona		–		7	–	2	–	0
Montana State		–		5	–	3	–	1
Santa Clara		–		4	–	3	–	0
Hawaii		–		3	–	7	–	0
Pepperdine		–		1	–	9	–	0

=== NAIA conferences ===
1960 Arkansas Intercollegiate Conference football standings
	Conf.					Overall
Team	W		L		T	W		L		T
No. 20 Arkansas Tech $	8	–	0	–	0	10	–	1	–	0
Arkansas State Teachers	6	–	1	–	0	8	–	1	–	0
Henderson State	5	–	2	–	0	6	–	4	–	0
Southern State (AR)	5	–	3	–	0	5	–	4	–	0
Hendrix	3	–	3	–	1	3	–	5	–	1
Arkansas A&M	3	–	5	–	0	3	–	6	–	0
Ouachita Baptist	1	–	5	–	1	1	–	7	–	2
Harding	1	–	5	–	2	1	–	5	–	3
Ozarks	0	–	8	–	0	0	–	9	–	0
$ – Conference champion; Rankings from NAIA poll

1960 Badger-Gopher Conference football standings
	Conf.					Overall
Team	W		L		T	W		L		T
Lakeland $	4	–	0	–	0	5	–	3	–	0
Northland	3	–	1	–	0	5	–	3	–	0
Northwestern (WI)	2	–	2	–	0	4	–	3	–	0
Bethel (MN)	1	–	3	–	0	2	–	6	–	0
Milton	0	–	4	–	0	1	–	4	–	0
$ – Conference champion

1960 Central Intercollegiate Conference football standings
	Conf.					Overall
Team	W		L		T	W		L		T
No. 19 St. Benedict's $	5	–	0	–	0	7	–	1	–	0
No. 14 Pittsburg State	4	–	1	–	0	8	–	1	–	0
Emporia State	2	–	3	–	0	3	–	5	–	0
Washburn	2	–	3	–	0	3	–	6	–	0
Fort Hays State	1	–	4	–	0	2	–	7	–	0
Omaha	1	–	4	–	0	1	–	7	–	1
$ – Conference champion; Rankings from NAIA poll

1960 College Conference of Illinois football standings
	Conf.					Overall
Team	W		L		T	W		L		T
North Central (IL) $	4	–	1	–	0	7	–	2	–	0
Illinois Wesleyan	3	–	2	–	0	7	–	2	–	0
Millikin	3	–	2	–	0	6	–	2	–	0
Carroll (WI)	1	–	2	–	2	2	–	5	–	2
Lake Forest	1	–	3	–	1	4	–	3	–	1
Augustana (IL)	1	–	3	–	1	3	–	4	–	2
$ – Conference champion

1960 Evergreen Conference football standings
	Conf.					Overall
Team	W		L		T	W		L		T
No. 4 Whitworth $^	7	–	0	–	0	9	–	1	–	0
Central Washington	4	–	3	–	0	4	–	4	–	0
Puget Sound	4	–	3	–	0	4	–	4	–	1
Pacific Lutheran	2	–	5	–	0	3	–	6	–	0
Western Washington	2	–	5	–	0	2	–	7	–	0
Eastern Washington	2	–	5	–	0	2	–	7	–	0
$ – Conference champion; ^ – NAIA playoff participant; Rankings from NAIA poll

1960 Far Western Conference football standings
	Conf.					Overall
Team	W		L		T	W		L		T
No. 2/3 Humboldt State $	5	–	0	–	0	11	–	1	–	0
San Francisco State	4	–	1	–	0	9	–	1	–	0
Chico State	2	–	3	–	0	6	–	4	–	0
Sacramento State	2	–	3	–	0	5	–	5	–	0
Nevada	2	–	3	–	0	3	–	6	–	0
UC Davis	0	–	5	–	0	0	–	8	–	1
$ – Conference champion; Rankings from NAIA poll and AP small college poll

1960 Frontier Conference football standings
	Conf.					Overall
Team	W		L		T	W		L		T
New Mexico Highlands +	2	–	0	–	1	6	–	2	–	1
Arizona State–Flagstaff +	2	–	0	–	1	6	–	3	–	2
Panhandle A&M	1	–	2	–	0	4	–	6	–	0
New Mexico Western	0	–	3	–	0	1	–	7	–	0
+ – Conference co-champions

1960 Gulf States Conference football standings
	Conf.					Overall
Team	W		L		T	W		L		T
No. 5 Southeastern Louisiana +	4	–	1	–	0	9	–	1	–	0
No. 12 Louisiana Tech +	4	–	1	–	0	8	–	2	–	0
McNeese State	3	–	2	–	0	7	–	3	–	0
Southwestern Louisiana	3	–	2	–	0	6	–	4	–	0
Northeast Louisiana State	1	–	4	–	0	3	–	7	–	0
Northwestern State	0	–	5	–	0	3	–	6	–	0
+ – Conference co-champions; Rankings from NAIA poll

1960 Indiana Collegiate Conference football standings
	Conf.					Overall
Team	W		L		T	W		L		T
Butler $	5	–	1	–	0	7	–	1	–	0
Evansville	4	–	2	–	0	5	–	3	–	0
Saint Joseph's (IN)	3	–	2	–	1	3	–	4	–	1
Indiana State	3	–	3	–	0	3	–	4	–	0
Ball State	2	–	4	–	0	3	–	5	–	0
Valparaiso	2	–	4	–	0	3	–	6	–	0
DePauw	1	–	4	–	1	2	–	5	–	1
$ – Conference champion

1960 Interstate Intercollegiate Athletic Conference football standings
	Conf.					Overall
Team	W		L		T	W		L		T
No. 13 Southern Illinois $	6	–	0	–	0	8	–	2	–	0
Western Illinois	5	–	1	–	0	6	–	2	–	0
Northern Illinois	4	–	2	–	0	7	–	2	–	0
Central Michigan	3	–	3	–	0	3	–	5	–	0
Illinois State Normal	1	–	4	–	1	2	–	6	–	1
Eastern Illinois	1	–	5	–	0	2	–	7	–	0
Eastern Michigan	0	–	5	–	1	0	–	8	–	1
$ – Conference champion; Rankings from NAIA poll

1960 Iowa Conference football standings
	Conf.					Overall
Team	W		L		T	W		L		T
No. 17 Parsons +	7	–	1	–	0	8	–	1	–	0
Luther +	7	–	1	–	0	8	–	1	–	0
Wartburg	6	–	2	–	0	7	–	2	–	0
Upper Iowa	5	–	3	–	0	5	–	5	–	0
Dubuque	4	–	4	–	0	4	–	4	–	0
Buena Vista	3	–	5	–	0	4	–	5	–	0
Central (IA)	3	–	5	–	0	3	–	6	–	0
Iowa Wesleyan	1	–	7	–	0	1	–	8	–	1
Simpson (IA)	0	–	8	–	0	0	–	9	–	0
+ – Conference co-champions; Rankings from NAIA poll

1960 Kansas Collegiate Athletic Conference football standings
	Conf.					Overall
Team	W		L		T	W		L		T
Ottawa $	9	–	0	–	0	9	–	0	–	0
Baker	8	–	1	–	0	8	–	1	–	0
Southwestern (KS)	5	–	3	–	1	5	–	3	–	1
College of Emporia	5	–	4	–	0	5	–	4	–	0
Bethany (KS)	4	–	4	–	1	4	–	4	–	1
Bethel (KS)	4	–	4	–	1	4	–	4	–	1
Kansas Wesleyan	4	–	4	–	1	4	–	4	–	1
McPherson	1	–	7	–	1	1	–	7	–	1
Friends	1	–	7	–	1	1	–	8	–	1
Sterling	1	–	8	–	0	1	–	8	–	0
$ – Conference champion

1960 Lone Star Conference football standings
	Conf.					Overall
Team	W		L		T	W		L		T
No. 3 Texas A&I $	6	–	1	–	0	8	–	1	–	1
East Texas State	5	–	2	–	0	6	–	4	–	0
Lamar Tech	5	–	2	–	0	8	–	4	–	0
Howard Payne	4	–	3	–	0	6	–	4	–	0
Sul Ross	4	–	3	–	0	7	–	3	–	0
Sam Houston State	2	–	5	–	0	3	–	6	–	0
Southwest Texas State	1	–	6	–	0	2	–	8	–	0
Stephen F. Austin	1	–	6	–	0	1	–	10	–	0
$ – Conference champion; Rankings from NAIA poll

1960 Mid-Ohio League football standings
	Conf.					Overall
Team	W		L		T	W		L		T
Ohio Northern +	4	–	1	–	0	7	–	2	–	0
Ashland +	4	–	1	–	0	6	–	3	–	0
Bluffton +	4	–	1	–	0	5	–	3	–	1
Findlay	2	–	3	–	0	2	–	7	–	0
Defiance	1	–	4	–	0	1	–	7	–	1
Wilmington (OH)	0	–	5	–	0	0	–	8	–	0
+ – Conference co-champions

1960 Midwest Conference football standings
	Conf.					Overall
Team	W		L		T	W		L		T
St. Olaf $	6	–	2	–	0	6	–	2	–	0
Coe	5	–	2	–	1	5	–	2	–	1
Cornell (IA)	5	–	2	–	1	5	–	2	–	1
Carleton	5	–	3	–	0	5	–	3	–	0
Grinnell	4	–	4	–	0	4	–	4	–	0
Monmouth (IL)	3	–	4	–	1	3	–	4	–	1
Ripon	3	–	4	–	1	3	–	4	–	1
Knox	2	–	4	–	2	2	–	4	–	2
Lawrence	3	–	5	–	0	3	–	5	–	0
Beloit	1	–	7	–	0	1	–	7	–	0
$ – Conference champion

1960 Minnesota Intercollegiate Athletic Conference football standings
	Conf.					Overall
Team	W		L		T	W		L		T
Minnesota–Duluth $	6	–	1	–	0	6	–	1	–	1
Concordia (MN)	5	–	2	–	0	7	–	2	–	0
Macalester	5	–	2	–	0	7	–	2	–	0
Augsburg	4	–	3	–	0	5	–	3	–	0
Saint John's (MN)	3	–	3	–	1	4	–	3	–	1
Gustavus Adolphus	3	–	3	–	1	3	–	5	–	1
St. Thomas (MN)	1	–	6	–	0	2	–	6	–	0
Hamline	0	–	7	–	0	0	–	8	–	0
$ – Conference champion

1960 Missouri College Athletic Union football standings
	Conf.					Overall
Team	W		L		T	W		L		T
Missouri Valley +	3	–	0	–	1	7	–	1	–	1
William Jewell +	3	–	0	–	1	7	–	1	–	1
Culver–Stockton	3	–	2	–	0	4	–	5	–	0
Tarkio	2	–	3	–	0	4	–	4	–	0
Central (MO)	0	–	2	–	0	1	–	7	–	0
Graceland	0	–	4	–	0	2	–	7	–	0
+ – Conference co-champions

1960 Montana Collegiate Conference football standings
	Conf.					Overall
Team	W		L		T	W		L		T
Eastern Montana +	4	–	1	–	0	5	–	2	–	0
Carroll (MT) +	4	–	1	–	0	5	–	3	–	0
Western Montana	3	–	2	–	0	5	–	2	–	2
Rocky Mountain	3	–	2	–	0	3	–	4	–	0
Northern Montana	1	–	4	–	0	1	–	6	–	0
Montana Mines	0	–	5	–	0	?	–	?	–	?
+ – Conference co-champions

1960 Nebraska College Conference football standings
	Conf.					Overall
Team	W		L		T	W		L		T
Peru State $	5	–	1	–	0	6	–	2	–	1
Hastings	4	–	2	–	0	5	–	4	–	0
Wayne State (NE)	4	–	2	–	0	5	–	4	–	0
Kearney State	4	–	2	–	0	4	–	5	–	0
Doane	2	–	4	–	0	4	–	5	–	0
Chadron State	2	–	4	–	0	3	–	5	–	0
Nebraska Wesleyan	0	–	6	–	0	0	–	8	–	0
$ – Conference champion

1960 North Dakota Intercollegiate Conference football standings
	Conf.					Overall
Team	W		L		T	W		L		T
Mayville State +	5	–	1	–	0	7	–	1	–	0
Dickinson State +	5	–	1	–	0	5	–	3	–	0
Minot State	3	–	2	–	0	4	–	3	–	0
Valley City State	3	–	3	–	0	4	–	4	–	0
Jamestown	3	–	3	–	0	3	–	5	–	0
Ellendale	1	–	4	–	0	?	–	?	–	?
Wahpeton Science	0	–	6	–	0	?	–	?	–	?
+ – Conference co-champions

1960 North State Conference football standings
	Conf.					Overall
Team	W		L		T	W		L		T
No. 1/2 Lenoir Rhyne $^	6	–	0	–	0	12	–	0	–	0
Appalachian State	5	–	1	–	0	8	–	2	–	0
East Carolina	4	–	2	–	0	7	–	3	–	0
Western Carolina	2	–	4	–	0	6	–	5	–	0
Elon	2	–	4	–	0	4	–	6	–	0
Catawba	2	–	4	–	0	2	–	9	–	0
Guilford	0	–	6	–	0	1	–	8	–	0
$ – Conference champion; ^ – NAIA playoff participant; Rankings from NAIA poll and AP small college poll

1960 Northern State College Conference football standings
	Conf.					Overall
Team	W		L		T	W		L		T
Mankato State $	4	–	0	–	1	5	–	3	–	1
Michigan Tech	4	–	1	–	0	5	–	3	–	0
St. Cloud State	2	–	3	–	0	3	–	5	–	0
Bemidji State	2	–	3	–	0	2	–	6	–	0
Winona State	1	–	3	–	1	4	–	3	–	1
Moorhead State	1	–	4	–	0	2	–	7	–	0
$ – Conference champion

1960 Northwest Conference football standings
	Conf.					Overall
Team	W		L		T	W		L		T
No. 10 Willamette $	5	–	0	–	0	8	–	0	–	0
Linfield	4	–	1	–	0	7	–	2	–	0
Lewis & Clark	3	–	2	–	0	6	–	4	–	0
Pacific (OR)	2	–	3	–	0	5	–	4	–	0
Whitman	1	–	4	–	0	3	–	6	–	0
College of Idaho	0	–	5	–	0	2	–	8	–	0
$ – Conference champion; Rankings from NAIA poll

1960 Oklahoma Collegiate Conference football standings
	Conf.					Overall
Team	W		L		T	W		L		T
No. 9 Langston $	6	–	0	–	0	9	–	1	–	0
NW Oklahoma State	4	–	2	–	0	6	–	3	–	0
East Central	4	–	2	–	0	7	–	5	–	0
Central State (OK)	3	–	3	–	0	6	–	4	–	0
SE Oklahoma State	3	–	3	–	0	4	–	5	–	1
SW Oklahoma State	1	–	5	–	0	1	–	9	–	0
Northeastern State	0	–	6	–	0	1	–	8	–	0
$ – Conference champion; Rankings from NAIA poll

1960 Oregon Collegiate Conference football standings
	Conf.					Overall
Team	W		L		T	W		L		T
Oregon Tech $	4	–	0	–	0	9	–	0	–	0
Southern Oregon	3	–	1	–	0	5	–	4	–	0
Portland State	1	–	2	–	1	2	–	4	–	2
Oregon College	1	–	3	–	0	3	–	5	–	0
Eastern Oregon	0	–	3	–	1	0	–	7	–	2
$ – Conference champion

1960 Pennsylvania State College Conference football standings
	Conf.					Overall
Team	W		L		T	W		L		T
East Division
No. 8/5 West Chester xy$	5	–	0	–	0	9	–	0	–	0
Millersville	4	–	1	–	0	6	–	3	–	0
Bloomsburg	4	–	2	–	0	5	–	2	–	1
East Stroudsburg	5	–	3	–	0	6	–	3	–	0
Mansfield	2	–	5	–	0	3	–	5	–	0
Kutztown	1	–	5	–	0	1	–	7	–	0
Cheyney	0	–	5	–	0	0	–	7	–	0
West Division
Lock Haven xy	6	–	1	–	0	8	–	2	–	0
California (PA)	5	–	1	–	0	7	–	1	–	0
Slippery Rock	2	–	1	–	2	5	–	1	–	2
Clarion	2	–	4	–	1	3	–	4	–	1
Indiana (PA)	1	–	3	–	2	2	–	4	–	2
Edinboro	1	–	3	–	1	3	–	4	–	1
Shippensburg	2	–	6	–	0	2	–	7	–	0
Championship: West Chester 35, Lock Haven 6
$ – Conference champion; x – Division champion/co-champions; y – Championship game participant; Interdivisional games counted in conference standings.; Rankings from NAIA poll and AP small college poll

1960 Rocky Mountain Conference football standings
	Conf.					Overall
Team	W		L		T	W		L		T
No. 16 Adams State $	4	–	0	–	0	7	–	0	–	1
Idaho State	3	–	1	–	0	6	–	2	–	0
Colorado Mines	3	–	2	–	0	6	–	3	–	0
Colorado State–Greeley	2	–	2	–	1	6	–	3	–	1
Colorado College	1	–	4	–	0	4	–	5	–	0
Western State (CO)	0	–	4	–	1	1	–	7	–	1
$ – Conference champion; Rankings from NAIA poll

1960 South Dakota Intercollegiate Conference football standings
	Conf.					Overall
Team	W		L		T	W		L		T
Northern State +	5	–	1	–	0	8	–	1	–	0
Huron +	5	–	1	–	0	7	–	2	–	0
South Dakota Tech	4	–	2	–	0	5	–	3	–	0
Dakota Wesleyan	3	–	3	–	0	4	–	5	–	0
Southern State (SD)	3	–	3	–	0	4	–	4	–	0
Black Hills	0	–	5	–	1	1	–	6	–	1
General Beadle	0	–	5	–	1	2	–	6	–	1
+ – Conference co-champions

1960 Southern California Intercollegiate Athletic Conference football standings
	Conf.					Overall
Team	W		L		T	W		L		T
Whittier +	4	–	1	–	0	8	–	2	–	0
Redlands +	4	–	1	–	0	6	–	3	–	1
Occidental +	4	–	1	–	0	5	–	3	–	0
Claremont-Mudd	2	–	3	–	0	4	–	5	–	0
Pomona	1	–	4	–	0	3	–	7	–	0
Caltech	0	–	5	–	0	0	–	8	–	0
+ – Conference co-champions

1960 Southwestern Athletic Conference football standings
	Conf.					Overall
Team	W		L		T	W		L		T
Prairie View A&M +	6	–	1	–	0	10	–	1	–	0
Grambling +	6	–	1	–	0	9	–	1	–	0
No. 7 Southern +	6	–	1	–	0	9	–	1	–	0
Jackson State	4	–	3	–	0	6	–	4	–	0
Arkansas AM&N	3	–	4	–	0	6	–	4	–	0
Texas Southern	2	–	5	–	0	4	–	6	–	0
Wiley	1	–	6	–	0	2	–	7	–	0
Texas College	0	–	7	–	0	1	–	9	–	0
+ – Conference co-champions; Rankings from NAIA poll

1960 Tri-State Conference football standings
	Conf.					Overall
Team	W		L		T	W		L		T
Concordia (NE) $	5	–	0	–	1	7	–	1	–	1
Midland	5	–	1	–	0	7	–	1	–	0
Sioux Falls	4	–	2	–	0	6	–	2	–	0
Westmar	3	–	2	–	1	3	–	4	–	1
Dana	2	–	4	–	0	2	–	6	–	0
Yankton	1	–	5	–	0	1	–	7	–	0
Northwestern (IA)	0	–	6	–	0	0	–	6	–	0
$ – Conference champion

1960 West Penn Conference football standings
	Conf.					Overall
Team	W		L		T	W		L		T
Westminster (PA) $	5	–	0	–	0	5	–	3	–	0
Saint Vincent	4	–	1	–	0	4	–	3	–	1
Carnegie Tech	3	–	2	–	0	3	–	5	–	0
Geneva	1	–	3	–	0	4	–	5	–	0
Grove City	0	–	3	–	1	2	–	4	–	3
Waynesburg	0	–	4	–	1	0	–	8	–	1
$ – Conference champion

1960 West Virginia Intercollegiate Athletic Conference football standings
	Conf.					Overall
Team	W		L		T	W		L		T
Eastern Division
Salem x	4	–	4	–	0	4	–	6	–	0
West Liberty State	2	–	4	–	1	2	–	5	–	1
Davis & Elkins	1	–	6	–	0	1	–	6	–	0
Shepherd	0	–	4	–	0	4	–	4	–	0
West Virginia State	0	–	4	–	0	1	–	6	–	0
Bluefield State *	1	–	0	–	0	3	–	6	–	0
Western Division
Fairmont State x$	7	–	1	–	0	8	–	1	–	0
West Virginia Wesleyan	5	–	1	–	0	6	–	2	–	0
Glenville State	5	–	2	–	0	5	–	2	–	0
Concord	4	–	2	–	2	4	–	3	–	2
West Virginia Tech	2	–	1	–	1	4	–	3	–	1
Potomac State	2	–	3	–	0	1	–	4	–	0
Bethany (WV) *	0	–	1	–	0	1	–	6	–	0
$ – Conference champion; x – Division champion/co-champions; * – Did not qualify for conference standings Conference standings based on power ratings

1960 Wisconsin State College Conference football standings
	Conf.					Overall
Team	W		L		T	W		L		T
No. 18 Whitewater State $	6	–	0	–	0	7	–	0	–	1
La Crosse State	4	–	2	–	0	5	–	4	–	0
Stout State	4	–	2	–	0	4	–	4	–	0
Stevens Point State	4	–	3	–	0	5	–	3	–	0
Eau Claire State	4	–	3	–	1	4	–	4	–	1
Oshkosh State	3	–	4	–	0	3	–	4	–	0
Milwaukee	2	–	4	–	0	2	–	6	–	0
Superior State	1	–	4	–	1	2	–	5	–	2
River Falls State	1	–	4	–	1	2	–	6	–	1
Platteville State	1	–	4	–	1	1	–	5	–	1
$ – Conference champion; Rankings from NAIA poll

1960 NAIA independents football records
	Conf.			Overall
Team	W	L	T	W		L		T
No. 15 Hillsdale		–		9	–	1	–	0
No. 11 Northern Michigan ^		–		8	–	1	–	1
Austin		–		6	–	3	–	0
Earlham		–		5	–	3	–	0
Wheaton (IL)		–		4	–	4	–	1
Eastern New Mexico		–		4	–	5	–	0
La Verne		–		4	–	5	–	0
Oklahoma Panhandle State		–		4	–	6	–	0
St. Mary of the Plains		–		3	–	5	–	0
McMurry		–		3	–	7	–	0
Georgetown (KY)		–		2	–	6	–	0
^ – NAIA playoff participant; Rankings from NAIA poll

== Rankings ==
=== Major college polls ===
AP writers poll
Rank	Team	1st	Points
1	Minnesota (8–2)	17.5	433.5
2	Ole Miss (10–0–1)	16	411
3	Iowa (8–1)	12.5	407.5
4	Navy (9–2)		262
5	Missouri (11–0)		253
6	Washington (10–1)	2	250
7	Arkansas (8–3)		212
8	Ohio State (7–2)		138
9	Alabama (8–1–2)		53
10	Duke (8–3)		46
11	Kansas (5–4–1)		40
12	Baylor (8–3)		35
13	Auburn (8–2)		25
14	Yale (9–0)		17
15	Michigan State (6–2–1)		16
16	Penn State (7–3)		15
17	New Mexico State (11–0)		8
18	Florida (9–2)		6
19	Purdue (4–4–1)		4
19	Syracuse (7–2)		4

UPI coaches poll
Rank	Team	1st	Points
1	Minnesota	21	326
2	Iowa	5	300
3	Ole Miss	9	284
4	Missouri		194
5	Washington		181
6	Navy		150
7	Arkansas		137
8	Ohio State		89
9	Kansas		44
9	Alabama		44
11	Duke		35
12	Baylor		29
13	Michigan State		26
14	Auburn		16
15	Purdue		14
16	Florida		10
17	Texas (7–3–1)		7
18	Yale		6
18	New Mexico State		6
18	Tennessee (6–2–2)		6

=== Small college polls ===
In 1960, both United Press International (UPI) and the Associated Press (AP) conducted "small college" polls. This was the first year that the AP (polling a panel of eight "selectors" from NCAA districts) conducted their poll, and the third year that UPI (polling a panel of coaches) conducted their poll. Both wire services named the Ohio Bobcats – who had a record of 10–0, registered five shutouts, and held all their opponents to eight points or less – as the number one team.

United Press International (coaches) final poll
Published on November 25

Rank	School	Record†	No. 1 votes	Total points
1	Ohio	10–0	28	348
2	Bowling Green	8–1		250
3	Lenoir–Rhyne	10–0	3	236
4	Muskingum	9–0	1	100
5	Florida A&M	7–1		94
6	Louisiana Tech	8–2	1	93
7	Iowa State Teachers	9–1		82
8	Humboldt State	10–0	1	71
9	Fresno State	8–1		70
10	Southeastern Louisiana	9–1	1	57

†Rankings were published without records.

Associated Press (writers) final poll
Published on December 1

Rank	School	Record	No. 1 votes	Total points
1	Ohio	10–0	4	65
2	Lenoir–Rhyne	10–0		46
3	Humboldt State	10–0	1	34
4	Whitworth	9–0		32
5	West Chester	9–0	1	30
6	Bowling Green	8–1		28
7	Louisiana Tech	8–2		26
8	Hillsdale	9–1		19
9	Muskingum	9–0		16
10	Iowa State Teachers	9–1		15

== Postseason ==
Because the final polls came out in November, the outcome of the post-season bowl games had no effect on the championships already awarded by the AP and UPI polls. As winner of the Big Ten title, No. 1 Minnesota went to the Rose Bowl to face Washington, which had the best record of the five teams in the AAWU (today's Pac-12). No. 2 Mississippi, as winner of the SEC, was invited to the Sugar Bowl to face unranked Rice University. The Big Ten did not allow its teams to play in a postseason game other than the Rose Bowl, so No. 3 Iowa stayed home. Although Washington upset Minnesota 17–7 in Pasadena, the post-season loss did not affect the Gophers' championship as determined by the AP and UPI. Washington also claims the 1960 National Championship.

=== Major bowls ===
Monday, January 2, 1961

Bowl				
Rose Bowl	No. 6 Washington Huskies	17	No. 1 Minnesota Golden Gophers	7
Sugar Bowl	No. 2 Mississippi Rebels	14	Rice Owls	6
Orange Bowl	No. 5 Missouri Tigers	21	No. 4 Navy Midshipmen	14
Cotton Bowl	No. 10 Duke Blue Devils	7	No. 7 Arkansas Razorbacks	6

=== Other bowls ===
Bowl	Location	Date	Winner	Score	Loser
Sun Bowl	El Paso, TX	December 31	No. 17 New Mexico State	20–13	Utah State
Gator Bowl	Jacksonville, FL	December 31	No. 18 Florida	13–12	No. 12 Baylor
Tangerine Bowl	Orlando, FL	December 30	The Citadel	27–0	Tennessee Tech
Bluebonnet Bowl	Houston, TX	December 17	No. 9 Alabama	3–3	Texas
Liberty Bowl	Philadelphia, PA	December 17	No. 16 Penn State	41–12	Oregon
Prairie View Bowl	Houston, TX	January 1, 1961	Prairie View	19–8	Arkansas AM&N
Orange Blossom Classic	Miami, FL	December 10	Florida A&M	40–26	Langston
Mineral Water Bowl	Excelsior Springs, MO	November 26	Hillsdale	17–6	Iowa Teachers
Great Southwest Bowl	Grand Prairie, TX	December 31	Texas A&I	45–14	Arkansas Tech
West Virginia Bowl	Clarksburg, WV	November 24	Fairmont State	13–7	Salem
Rice Bowl	Stuttgart, AR	December 2	East Central	25–7	Henderson State
Rocket Bowl			Maryville (TN)	19–0	Milligan

=== NAIA postseason ===
The 1960 NAIA football season was the fifth season of college football sponsored by the National Association of Intercollegiate Athletics. The season culminated in the fifth annual NAIA Football National Championship, played this year for the last time at Stewart Field in St. Petersburg, Florida. During its four years in St. Petersburg, the game was called the Holiday Bowl.

Lenoir Rhyne, who lost the 1959 championship game, defeated Humboldt State in the championship game, 15–14, to win their first NAIA national title.

Semifinals; December 3, 1960
Whitworth	6
Humboldt State*	13
Northern Michigan	20
Lenoir Rhyne*	20†

Championship; December 17, 1960; Holiday Bowl
Humboldt State	14
Lenoir Rhyne	15

- † The game ended in a tie but Lenoir Rhyne advanced based on having more total penetrations within Northern Michigan's 20 yard line.

== Award season ==
=== Heisman Trophy voting ===
The Heisman Trophy is given to the year's most outstanding player

Player	School	Position	1st	2nd	3rd	Total
Joe Bellino	Navy	HB	436	196	93	1,793
Tom Brown	Minnesota	G	127	121	108	731
Jake Gibbs	Ole Miss	QB	74	77	77	453
Ed Dyas	Auburn	FB	46	63	55	319
Billy Kilmer	UCLA	HB	55	42	31	280
Mike Ditka	Pittsburgh	E	17	52	68	223
Tom Matte	Ohio State	QB	17	42	30	165
Dan LaRose	Missouri	E	16	28	32	136
Pervis Atkins	New Mexico State	HB	25	18	13	124
E. J. Holub	Texas Tech	C	14	23	29	117

=== All-Americans ===
For the year 1960, the NCAA recognizes six published All-American teams as "official" designations for purposes of its consensus determinations. The following chart identifies the NCAA-recognized consensus All-Americans and displays which first-team designations they received.

Name	Position	School	Number	Official	Other
Mike Ditka	End	Pittsburgh	6/6	AFCA, AP, FWAA, NEA, SN, UPI	CP, Time, WC
Dan LaRose	End	Missouri	6/6	AFCA, AP, FWAA, NEA, SN, UPI	CP, Time, WC
Bob Lilly	Tackle	TCU	6/6	AFCA, AP, FWAA, NEA, SN, UPI	CP, Time, WC
Tom Brown	Guard	Minnesota	6/6	AFCA, AP, FWAA, NEA, SN, UPI	CP, Time, WC
Joe Bellino	Halfback	Navy	6/6	AFCA, AP, FWAA, NEA, SN, UPI	CP, Time, WC
Bob Ferguson	Fullback	Ohio State	6/6	AFCA, AP, FWAA, NEA, SN, UPI	CP, Time, WC
Jake Gibbs	Quarterback	Ole Miss	6/6	AFCA, AP, FWAA, NEA, SN, UPI	CP, WC
Ken Rice	Tackle	Auburn	5/6	AFCA, AP, FWAA, SN, UPI	CP, Time, WC
E. J. Holub	Center	Texas Tech	5/6	AFCA, FWAA, NEA, SN, UPI	CP, Time, WC
Joe Romig	Guard	Colorado	3/6	AFCA, FWAA, UPI	WC
Ernie Davis	Halfback	Syracuse	2/6	AFCA, UPI	WC

=== Other awards ===
- Maxwell Award - Joe Bellino, Navy
- Sammy Baugh Trophy - Harold Stephens, Hardin-Simmons
- Outland Trophy (best lineman) - Tom Brown, Minnesota
- AFCA Coach of the Year Award - Murray Warmath, Minnesota
- FWAA Coach of the Year Award - Murray Warmath, Minnesota

== Statistical leaders ==
=== Individual ===
==== Total offense ====
The following players were the individual leaders in total offense during the 1960 season:

Major college

Rank	Player	Team	Games	Plays	Total Yds	PtR
1	Billy Kilmer	UCLA	10	292	1889	104
2	Mel Melin	Washington State	10	313	1715	92
3	Charley Johnson	New Mexico State	10	262	1634	88
4	Norm Snead	Wake Forest	10	312	1630	69
5	Howard Dyer	VMI	10	260	1478	138
6	Terry Baker	Oregon State	10	228	1473	56
7	Tom Matte	Ohio State	9	256	1419	62
8	Ron Miller	Wisconsin	9	238	1395	68
9	James Earl Wright	Memphis State	10	191	1375	112
10	Roman Gabriel	NC State	10	284	1340	92

Small college

Rank	Player	Team	Games	Plays	Total Yds
1	Miller	Austin	9	287	1966
2	Dennis Spurlock	Whitworth	9	291	1897
3	Daniels	Bishop	10	354	1846
4	Corny Addison	Jackson	10	235	1623
5	Don Cavalli	Wagner	9	244	1556
6	Light	Pacific (OR)	9	284	1534
7	Joe Iacone	West Chester	9	199	1438
8	Johnson	Whitewater State	8	221	1385
9	Mills	NE Missouri	9	232	1343
10	Jim Luce	Augustana (SD)	8	207	1326

==== Passing ====
The following players were the individual leaders in pass completions during the 1960 season:

Major college

Rank	Player	Team	Games	Compl.	Att.	Pct. Compl.	Yds.	Int.	TDs
1	Harold Stephens	Hardin-Simmons	10	145	256	.566	1254	14	3
2	Norm Snead	Wake Forest	10	123	259	.474	1676	14	10
3	Mel Melin	Washington State	10	119	221	.538	1638	13	11
4	Charley Johnson	New Mexico State	10	109	199	.548	1511	6	13
5	Fran Tarkenton	Georgia	10	108	185	.584	1189	12	8
6	Rich Mayo	Air Force	10	108	238	.454	1168	18	7
7	Roman Gabriel	NC State	10	105	186	.565	1176	7	8
8	Ron Miller	Wisconsin	9	97	188	.516	1354	16	8
9	Norman	Stanford	10	95	201	.473	1057	13	4
10	John Furman	Texas Western	10	94	192	.490	1094	7	4

Small college

Rank	Player	Team	Games	Compl.	Att.	Pct. Compl.	Yds.	Int.	TDs
1	Dennis Spurlock	Whitworth	9	135	257	.525	1892	16	14

==== Rushing ====
The following players were the individual leaders in rushing yards during the 1960 season:
Major college

Rank	Player	Team	Games	Yds	Rushes	Avg
1	Bob Gaiters	New Mexico State	10	1338	197	6.79
2	Tom Larscheid	Utah State	10	1044	197	8.42
3	Ernie Davis	Syracuse	9	877	112	7.83
4	Bob Ferguson	Ohio State	9	853	160	5.33
5	Dave Hoppmann	Iowa State	9	844	161	5.24
6	Joe Bellino	Navy	10	834	168	4.96
7	Billy Kilmer	UCLA	10	803	163	4.93
8	Hugh Scott	Princeton	9	760	140	5.43
9	Thompson	Arizona	10	732	92	7.96
10	Alan Rozycki	Dartmouth	9	725	169	4.29

Small college

Rank	Player	Team	Games	Yds	Rushes	Avg
1	Joe Iacone	West Chester	9	1438	199	7.23
2	Mills	NE Missouri	9	1343	229	5.86
3	Ron Puhl	Lock Haven State	10	1269	215	5.90
4	Steve McClellan	Wooster	10	1190	236	5.04
5	Bill "Catfish" Cooper	Muskingum	9	1102	185	5.96

==== Receiving ====
The following players were the individual leaders in receptions during the 1960 season:

Major college

Rank	Player	Team	Games	Receptions	Receiving Yards	Touchdowns
1	Hugh Campbell	Washington State	10	66	881	10
2	Claude "Tee" Moorman	Duke	10	46	431	2
3	Del Williams	Texas Western	10	36	414	2
4	Bob Coolbaugh	Richmond	10	35	380	2
5	Joe Kehoe	Virginia	10	34	378	2
6	Reg Carolan	Idaho	10	33	498	3
7	Brown	Georgia	10	31	275	3
8	Tom Hutchinson	Kentucky	10	30	4	
9	E.A. Sims	New Mexico State	10	30	415	2
9	Bobby Crespino	Ole Miss	10	30	408	4
9	Gary Collins	Maryland	10	30	404	4

Small college

Rank	Player	Team	Games	Receptions	Receiving Yards	Touchdowns
1	Ken Gregory	10	74	1018	4	

==== Scoring ====
The following players were the individual leaders in scoring during the 1960 season:

Major college

Rank	Player	Team	Pts	TD	PAT	FG
1	Bob Gaiters	New Mexico State	145	23	7	0
2	Joe Bellino	Navy	110	18	2	0
3	Jones	Arizona State	93	8	27	6
4	Tom Larscheid	Utah State	92	15	2	0
5	Pervis Atkins	New Mexico State	80	12	8	0
6	Bob Ferguson	Ohio State	78	13	0	0
6	Tom Mason	Tulane	78	13	0	0
6	Smith	Missouri	78	13	0	0
9	Hugh Campbell	Washington State	76	11	10	0
9	Joe Hernandez	Arizona	76	12	4	0
11	Dyer	VMI	72	12	0	0
12	Wilburn Hollis	Iowa	68	11	2	0
12	Kern	VMI	68	10	8	0
14	George Fleming	Washington	65	5	23	4
15	Ed Dyas	Auburn	63	2	12	13
16	Ernie Davis	Syracuse	62	10	2	0
16	Johnson	San Jose State	62	11 [sic?]	2	0
18	Tom Watkins	Iowa State	60	10	0	0
18	Bob Blanchard	Yale	60	8	12	0
18	Scott	College of Pacific	60	10	0	0

Small college

Rank	Player	Team	Pts	TD	PAT	FG
1	Bill Cooper	Muskingum	152	23	14	0
2	Herb Sutton	Ottawa	125	17	23	0
3	Jim Vogt	Northern State (SD)	121	14	37	0
4	Cecil Stephens	Humboldt State	120	20	0	0
5	Dale Mills	NE Missouri	118	18	10	0
6	Leroy Jackson	Western Illinois	112	18	4	0
6	J. R. Bishop	Franklin	112	14	28	0
8	Steve McClellan	Wooster	108	17	6	0
8	Dale Messer	Fresno State	108	18	0	0
10	Charlie Fuller	San Francisco State	104	17	2	0

=== Team ===
==== Total offense ====
The following teams were the leaders in total offense during the 1960 season:

Major college

Rank	Team	Games played	Total plays	Yards gained	Yards per game
1	New Mexico State	10	670	4196	419.6
2	Memphis State	10	612	3744	374.4
2	Utah State	10	648	3744	374.4
4	Ole Miss	10	646	3624	362.4
5	Mississippi Southern	10	670	3467	346.7
6	Wyoming	10	706	3333	333.3
7	Arizona State	10	683	3331	333.1
8	Oregon	10	650	3311	331.1
9	Oregon State	10	613	3306	330.6
10	Washington State	10	645	3295	329.5

Small college

Rank	Team	Games played	Total plays	Yards gained	Yards per game
1	Muskingum	9	623	4108	456.4
2	Florida A&M	9	556	3876	430.7
3	Whitewater State	8	583	3404	425.5
4	Willamette	8	581	3304	413.0
5	Grambling	10	581	4120	412.0
6	Howard	9	534	3581	409.0
7	West Chester	9	574	408.8	
8	Santa Clara	6	406	2411	401.8
9	Fresno State	10	629	4013	401.3
10	Adams State	8	582	3195	399.4

==== Scoring offense ====
The following teams were the leaders in scoring offense during the 1960 season:

Major college

Rank	Team	Points per game
1	New Mexico State	37.4
2	Memphis State	30.3
3	Yale	28.1
4	Missouri	27.3
5	Ole Miss	26.6
6	Utah State	26.1
7	Iowa	26.0
8	Princeton	25.8
9	Washington	25.5
10	Rutgers	25.0

==== Rushing offense ====
The following teams were the leaders in rushing offense during the 1960 season:

Major college

Rank	Team	Yards per game
1	Utah State	312.0
2	Memphis State	278.2
3	New Mexico State	263.9
4	Syracuse	256.6
5	Wyoming	255.3
6	Iowa	253.8
7	Missouri	250.0
8	Arizona State	248.9
9	Mississippi Southern	244.5
10	Princeton	236.9

Small college

Rank	Team	Yards per game
1	Muskingum	355.2
2	Huron	325.0
3	Concordia (MN)	313.7
4	Willamette	305.4
5	Ottawa	300.3
6	Grambling	299.9
7	Northern State (SD)	297.3
8	Pittsburg State	296.4
9	Northeast Missouri	293.1
10	Baker	283.6

==== Passing offense ====
The following teams were the leaders in passing offense during the 1960 season:

Major college

Rank	Team	Yards per game
1	Washington State	185.5
2	Wisconsin	169.6
3	Wake Forest	169.2
4	Kentucky	163.3
5	Baylor	161.8
6	New Mexico State	155.7
7	Detroit	154.0
8	San Jose State	153.6
9	Denver	148.9
10	VMI	142.4

Small college

Rank	Team	Yards per game
1	Whitworth	213.6
2	Jackson State	208.8
3	Fresno State	194.7
4	Whittier	192.9
5	Cal Poly	192.5
6	Pacific (OR)	188.6
7	Austin	187.6
8	Whitewater State	184.1
9	Wagner	183.2
10	Cal Poly Pomona	178.3

==== Total defense ====
The following teams were the leaders in total defense during the 1960 season:

Major college

Rank	Team	Games played	Total plays	Yards gained	Yards per game
1	Wyoming	10	477	1496	149.6
2	Alabama	10	536	1576	157.6
3	Ole Miss	10	542	1686	168.6
4	Syracuse	9	520	1559	173.2
5	Auburn	10	526	1741	174.1
6	Kentucky	10	545	1831	183.1
7	Kansas	10	555	1872	187.2
8	Army	10	530	1916	191.6
9	Missouri	10	563	1943	194.3
10	Utah State	10	566	1945	194.5

Small college

Rank	Team	Games played	Total plays	Yards gained	Yards per game
1	Maryland State	8	394	838	104.8
2	Florida A&M	9	430	977	108.6
3	Livingstone	10	480	1139	113.9
4	Delaware State	8	352	966	120.8
5	L.A. Pacific	7	308	861	123.0
6	Albany State	9	407	1142	126.9
7	Henderson	8	398	1033	129.1
8	Susquehanna	8	417	1059	132.4
9	Ferris Institute	8	391	1075	134.4
10	Grambling	10	464	1365	136.5

==== Scoring defense ====
The following teams were the leaders in scoring defense during the 1960 season:

Major college

Rank	Team	Points per game
1	LSU	5.0
2	Alabama	5.3
3	Rice	5.8
4	Ole Miss	6.4
5	Utah State	6.5
6	Wyoming	7.1
7	Dartmouth	7.3
8	Florida	7.4
9	Texas	7.5
10	Rutgers	7.7
10	Pittsburgh	7.7

==== Rushing defense ====
The following teams were the leaders in rushing defense during the 1960 season:

Major college

Rank	Team	Yards per game
1	Wyoming	82.4
2	Utah State	84.7
3	Alabama	89.1
4	Ole Miss	89.2
5	Yale	105.0
6	Memphis State	108.0
7	Mississippi Southern	108.2
8	Missouri	109.2
9	Florida	110.5
10	Washington	111.7

Small college

Rank	Team	Yards per game
1	West Chester	41.4
2	Grambling	43.1
3	Florida A&M	43.4
4	Maryland State	44.0
5	Whitewater State	50.6
6	Norfolk State	58.1
7	Livingstone	59.6
8	Los Angeles Pacific	61.1
9	Luther	70.8
10	Albany State	71.8

==== Passing defense ====
The following teams were the leaders in passing defense during the 1960 season:

Major college

Rank	Team	Yards per game
1	Iowa State	30.2
2	Dayton	45.4
3	Kansas	48.3
4	Kentucky	52.2
5	Tennessee	53.8
6	Colorado	55.7
7	The Citadel	57.0
8	Syracuse	57.3
9	Auburn	59.0
10	Kansas State	61.9

Small college

Rank	Team	Yards per game
1	Susquehanna	27.3
2	Henderson State	28.9
3	Western Carolina	34.2
4	Winona State	36.1
5	Delaware State	40.4
6	Western Kentucky	40.6
7	Texas Lutheran	41.6
8	Central State (OH)	42.1
9	Central (IA)	42.9
10	Ferris Institute	43.0
