= 1960 Adams State Indians football team =

American college football season

1960 Adams State Indians football

RMC champion
- Conference: Rocky Mountain Conference
- Record: 7–0–1 (4–0 RMC)
- Head coach: Darrell Mudra (2nd season)

1960 Rocky Mountain Conference football standings
	Conf.					Overall
Team	W		L		T	W		L		T
No. 16 Adams State $	4	–	0	–	0	7	–	0	–	1
Idaho State	3	–	1	–	0	6	–	2	–	0
Colorado Mines	3	–	2	–	0	6	–	3	–	0
Colorado State–Greeley	2	–	2	–	1	6	–	3	–	1
Colorado College	1	–	4	–	0	4	–	5	–	0
Western State (CO)	0	–	4	–	1	1	–	7	–	1
$ – Conference champion; Rankings from NAIA poll

The 1960 Adams State Indians football team represented Adams State College—now known as Adams State University—as a member of the Rocky Mountain Conference (RMC) during the 1960 NAIA football season. Led by second-year head coach Darrell Mudra, the Indians compiled an overall record of 7–0–1 with a mark of 4–0 in conference play, winning the RMC title. Adams State was ranked No. 16 in the final National Association of Intercollegiate Athletics (NAIA) poll and tied for No. 17 in the final UPI small college rankings.

== Schedule ==
Date	Time	Opponent	Site	Result	Attendance	Source
September 17		at New Mexico Western*	Silver City, NM	W 47–12		
September 24	7:00 p.m.	at Omaha*	Municipal Stadium; Omaha, NE	T 7–7		
October 1	8:00 p.m.	Colorado State–Greeley	Alamosa, CO	W 22–7		
October 15		Western State (CO)^{†}	Alamosa, CO	W 38–0		
October 22	2:00 p.m.	at New Mexico Highlands*	Las Vegas, NM	W 16–6	4,000	
October 28	1:30 p.m.	Eastern New Mexico	Alamosa, CO	W 31–14		
November 5		Colorado College	Alamosa, CO (Spud Bowl)	W 28–16	3,700	
November 19		at Colorado Mines	Golden, CO	W 44–14		
*Non-conference game; ^{†}Homecoming; All times are in Mountain time
