= 1960 Milwaukee Cardinals football team =

American college football season

1960 Milwaukee Cardinals football
- Conference: Wisconsin State College Conference
- Record: 2–6 (2–4 WSCC)
- Head coach: Wally Dreyer (1st season)
- Home stadium: Pearse Field

1960 Wisconsin State College Conference football standings
	Conf.					Overall
Team	W		L		T	W		L		T
No. 18 Whitewater State $	6	–	0	–	0	7	–	0	–	1
La Crosse State	4	–	2	–	0	5	–	4	–	0
Stout State	4	–	2	–	0	4	–	4	–	0
Stevens Point State	4	–	3	–	0	5	–	3	–	0
Eau Claire State	4	–	3	–	1	4	–	4	–	1
Oshkosh State	3	–	4	–	0	3	–	4	–	0
Milwaukee	2	–	4	–	0	2	–	6	–	0
Superior State	1	–	4	–	1	2	–	5	–	2
River Falls State	1	–	4	–	1	2	–	6	–	1
Platteville State	1	–	4	–	1	1	–	5	–	1
$ – Conference champion; Rankings from NAIA poll

The 1960 Milwaukee Cardinals football team represented the University of Wisconsin–Milwaukee as a member of the Wisconsin State College Conference (WSCC) during the 1962 college football season. Led by Wally Dreyer in his first season as head coach, Milwaukee compiled a record of 2–6, with a record in conference of 2–4, and finished seventh in the WSCC.

== Schedule ==
Date	Opponent	Site	Result	Attendance	Source
September 17	Ferris Institute*	Pearse Field; Milwaukee, WI	L 7–38		
September 24	Eau Claire State	Pearse Field; Milwaukee, WI	W 7–6		
October 1	at Platteville State	Legion Park; Platteville, WI	L 7–38		
October 8	at Superior State	Memorial Field; Superior, WI	L 0–7		
October 15	Stevens Point State	Pearse Field; Milwaukee, WI	L 7–45		
October 22	at Oshkosh State	Memorial Field; Oshkosh, WI	W 7–6		
October 29	Whitewater State	Pearse Field; Milwaukee, WI	L 6–34		
November 5	at Bradley*	Peoria Stadium; Peoria, IL	L 6–7	4,000	
*Non-conference game; Source:
