= 1960 Tennessee A&I Tigers football team =

American college football season

1960 Tennessee A&I Tigers football

MWAA champion
- Conference: Midwest Athletic Association
- Record: 7–3 (3–0 MWAA)
- Head coach: Howard C. Gentry (6th season)
- Home stadium: Hale Stadium

1960 Midwest Athletic Association football standings
	Conf.					Overall
Team	W		L		T	W		L		T
No. 5 Tennessee A&I $	3	–	0	–	0	7	–	3	–	0
Lincoln (MO)	2	–	1	–	0	3	–	5	–	0
Central State (OH)	1	–	2	–	0	7	–	2	–	0
Kentucky State	0	–	3	–	0	2	–	8	–	0
$ – Conference champion; Rankings from Associated Negro Press

The 1960 Tennessee A&I Tigers football team represented Tennessee Agricultural & Industrial State College (now known as Tennessee State University) as a member of the Midwest Athletic Association (MWAA) during the 1960 college football season. Led by sixth-year head coach Howard C. Gentry, the Tigers compiled an overall record of 7–3, with a 3–0 conference record, and finished as MWAA champion.

== Schedule ==
Date	Opponent	Site	Result	Attendance	Source
September 24	at North Carolina A&T*	World War Memorial Stadium; Greensboro, NC	W 13–12	7,500	
October 1	Morris Brown*	Hale Stadium; Nashville, TN	W 21–12	5,000	
October 8	at Grambling*	Grambling Stadium; Grambling, LA	L 6–20	12,000	
October 15	South Carolina State*	Hale Stadium; Nashville, TN	W 60–0	4,000	
October 22	at Central State (OH)	McPherson Stadium; Wilberforce, OH	W 28–12	3,000	
November 5	Southern*	Hale Stadium; Nashville, TN	L 6–7	4,500	
November 12	Lincoln (MO)	Hale Stadium; Nashville, TN	W 38–8		
November 19	at Prairie View A&M*	Edward L. Blackshear Field; Prairie View, TX	L 0–21		
November 24	Kentucky State	Hale Stadium; Nashville, TN	W 34–12		
December 3	at Jackson State*	Alumni Field; Jackson, MS	W 25–22		
*Non-conference game
