= 1960 Texas College Steers football team =

American college football season

1960 Texas College Steers football
- Conference: Southwestern Athletic Conference
- Record: 1–9 (0–7 SWAC)
- Head coach: Bo McMichael (4th season)
- Home stadium: Steer Stadium

1960 Southwestern Athletic Conference football standings
	Conf.					Overall
Team	W		L		T	W		L		T
Prairie View A&M +	6	–	1	–	0	10	–	1	–	0
Grambling +	6	–	1	–	0	9	–	1	–	0
No. 7 Southern +	6	–	1	–	0	9	–	1	–	0
Jackson State	4	–	3	–	0	6	–	4	–	0
Arkansas AM&N	3	–	4	–	0	6	–	4	–	0
Texas Southern	2	–	5	–	0	4	–	6	–	0
Wiley	1	–	6	–	0	2	–	7	–	0
Texas College	0	–	7	–	0	1	–	9	–	0
+ – Conference co-champions; Rankings from NAIA poll

The 1960 Texas College Steers football team represented Texas College as a member of the Southwestern Athletic Conference (SWAC) during the 1960 college football season. Led by fourth-year head coach Bo McMichael, the Steers compiled an overall record of 1–9 and a mark of 0–7 in conference play, and finished eighth in the SWAC.

== Schedule ==
Date	Opponent	Site	Result	Attendance	Source
September 17	at Paul Quinn*	Waco, TX	W 37–6		
September 24	Grambling	Steer Stadium; Tyler, TX	L 0–66	4,000	
October 1	at Arkansas AM&N	Pumphrey Stadium; Pine Bluff, AR	L 8–28		
October 8	vs. Langston*	Farrington Field; Fort Worth, TX	L 0–47		
October 15	Texas Southern	Steer Stadium; Tyler, TX	L 6–20		
October 22	Dillard*	Steer Stadium; Tyler, TX	L 19–26		
October 29	Southern	Steer Stadium; Tyler, TX	L 6–27		
November 5	at Prairie View A&M	Edward L. Blackshear Field; Prairie View, TX	L 6–37		
November 19	at Jackson State	Alumni Field; Jackson, MS	L 7–51		
November 24	Wiley	Steer Stadium; Tyler, TX	L 14–19		
*Non-conference game
