= 1960 Florida A&M Rattlers football team =

American college football season

1960 Florida A&M Rattlers football

SIAC champion

Orange Blossom Classic, W 40–26 vs. Langston
- Conference: Southern Intercollegiate Athletic Conference
- Record: 9–1 (5–0 SIAC)
- Head coach: Jake Gaither (16th season)
- Home stadium: Bragg Memorial Stadium

1960 Southern Intercollegiate Athletic Conference football standings
	Conf.					Overall
Team	W		L		T	W		L		T
No. 6 Florida A&M $	5	–	0	–	0	9	–	1	–	0
Alabama A&M	5	–	0	–	0	7	–	1	–	0
Benedict	6	–	2	–	0	7	–	3	–	0
Morehouse	4	–	2	–	0	5	–	3	–	0
Allen	4	–	2	–	0	6	–	4	–	0
Tuskegee	5	–	2	–	0	7	–	2	–	0
Alabama State	3	–	3	–	0	5	–	3	–	0
Bethune–Cookman	2	–	3	–	0	3	–	4	–	0
Fort Valley State	1	–	3	–	2	1	–	5	–	3
Morris Brown	3	–	4	–	0	4	–	6	–	0
Clark (GA)	1	–	3	–	1	2	–	5	–	1
Lane	1	–	4	–	0	1	–	5	–	1
Knoxville	1	–	5	–	0	1	–	6	–	0
Fisk	1	–	5	–	0	1	–	8	–	0
South Carolina State	0	–	5	–	1	1	–	7	–	1
Miles	2	–	1	–	0	4	–	2	–	0
$ – Conference champion; Standings were based on Dickinson System ratings.

The 1960 Florida A&M Rattlers football team was an American football team that represented Florida A&M University as a member of the Southern Intercollegiate Athletic Conference (SIAC) during the 1960 college football season. In their 16th season under head coach Jake Gaither, the Rattlers compiled a 9–1 record, including a victory over Langston in the Orange Blossom Classic. The team was ranked No. 5 in the final 1960 UPI small college poll. The team played its home games at Bragg Memorial Stadium in Tallahassee, Florida.

The team's 97 points and 14 touchdowns against Bethune–Cookman remain school records. The 1960 Rattlers also broke an NAIA scoring record with 475 points in nine regular season games (52.7 points per game).

Scatback Clarence Childs was selected as the captain of the All-SIAC team. Other key players included quarterback Emory Collier, halfback Robert Paremore, fullback Hewritt Dixon, and center Curt Miranda.

== Schedule ==
Date	Opponent	Rank	Site	Result	Attendance	Source
October 1	vs. Benedict		Phillips Field; Tampa, FL (Golden Triangle Classic)	W 68–0	14,000	
October 8	Lincoln (MO)*	No. 10	Bragg Memorial Stadium; Tallahassee, FL	W 48–6		
October 15	at Morris Brown	No. 10	Herndon Stadium; Atlanta, GA	W 64–0		
October 22	at Bethune–Cookman	No. 10	Memorial Stadium; Daytona Beach, FL	W 97–0		
October 29	vs. South Carolina State	No. 3	Gator Bowl Stadium; Jacksonville, FL	W 80–0		
November 5	North Carolina A&T*^{†}	No. 2	Bragg Memorial Stadium; Tallahassee, FL	W 49–19		
November 12	Allen	No. 3	Bragg Memorial Stadium; Tallahassee, FL	W 35–0		
November 19	at Southern*	No. 3	University Stadium; Baton Rouge, LA	L 6–14		
November 26	Texas Southern*		Bragg Memorial Stadium; Tallahassee, FL	W 30–8		
December 10	vs. Langston*		Miami Orange Bowl; Miami, FL (Orange Blossom Classic)	W 40–26	42,080	
*Non-conference game; ^{†}Homecoming; Rankings from AP Poll released prior to the game; Source:
