= Clarence Childs (American football) =

American football player (born 1938)

No. 48, 23
- Positions: Defensive back, halfback

Personal information
- Born: January 13, 1938 (age 88); Lakeland, Florida, U.S.
- Listed height: 5 ft 11 in (1.80 m)
- Listed weight: 186 lb (84 kg)

Career information
- High school: Rochelle (Lakeland)
- College: Florida A&M
- AFL draft: 1961: 20th round, 155th overall pick

Career history
- New York Giants (1964–1967); Chicago Bears (1968)
- Stats at Pro Football Reference

Clarence Childs (born January 13, 1938) is an American former professional football player who was a defensive back, halfback and kickoff returner in the National Football League (NFL). He played for the New York Giants from 1964 to 1967 and for the Chicago Bears in 1968. Known primarily as a kickoff returner, Childs returned two kickoffs for touchdowns in his five-year NFL career.

Childs played college football at halfback and defensive back for the Florida A&M Rattlers, who won two HBCU national championships, three Orange Bowl Classic games, and four Southern Intercollegiate Athletic Conference titles during his time with the team. He twice led the Rattlers in rushing, as a junior and senior, and was the most valuable player in the 1959 Orange Bowl Classic. The Pittsburgh Courier named Childs a first-team All-American in 1959 and 1960. The Rattlers only lost three games during Childs's four years with the team.

Childs graduated with a master's degree in guidance and counseling. In 1969, after retiring from football, he worked for 35 years at Bethune-Cookman in Daytona Beach, Florida. He served the majority of that time as the school's vice president of student affairs; where he was honored for his impact on generations of students as a mentor in providing support and guidance to them.

== Early life ==
Childs was born on January 13, 1938, in Lakeland, Florida. He attended Rochelle High School in Lakeland, where he was an honor student with an A average, graduating in 1956 as a member of the National Honor Society. The school was segregated when Childs was a student. He played football, baseball, and ran track at Rochelle; and was the school's most valuable player in football. He was the school's "Homecoming King" as a senior; and was the first athlete from Lakeland to play in the NFL. As of 2025, Childs is on the board of directors of Rochelle's alumni association.

== College football ==
Childs attended Florida A&M University where he played football for the Rattlers under College Football Hall of Fame coach Jake Gaither. Childs chose to attend Florida A&M because he want to play under coach Gaither, considering Gaither the best coach in the nation. Childs played halfback on offense and defensive back; and reportedly ran the 100-yard dash in 9.7 seconds.

The Rattlers played in the Southern Intercollegiate Athletic Conference (SIAC), and were SIAC champions every season of Childs's college career (1957 to 1960). They also played in the Orange Blossom Classic every season of Childs's college career; and were national black college champions in three of those four years.

As a freshman, Childs was a reserve halfback on the 1957 Rattlers team that won the national championship among historically black colleges and university teams. The Rattlers had a 9–0 record that season, and defeated Maryland State College (now the University of Maryland Eastern Shore) 27–21 in the 1957 Orange Blossom Classic; the winner of which was considered the national champion among black colleges. As a sophomore in 1958, Childs began the season as a halfback on the offense's second unit. The Rattlers lost to Prairie View in the 1958 Orange Blossom Classic, 26–8.

As a junior (1959) and senior (1960), Childs's Florida A&M teams won the Orange Blossom Classic. The 1959 Rattlers' team was undefeated, 10–0; with Childs scoring 103 points that year. The Rattlers won the Orange Blossom Classic over Prairie View, 28–7, and were considered black college national champions. Childs had three rushing touchdowns and scored 22 points in the game, and was named the game's most valuable player. The Pittsburgh Courier named Childs a first-team All-American in 1959. He had 541 rushing yards on 91 carries that year (5.9 yards per carry), seven receptions for 184 yards, and scored 15 touchdowns. He also intercepted five passes as a defensive back. In January 1960, Florida A&M presented Childs with the J. R. E. Lee Sr. Memorial Trophy as the team's most valuable player.

Despite a leg injury, Childs still led the Rattlers in scoring again in 1960. He averaged 7.3 yards per carry (468 yards on 64 carries), with 11 touchdowns; and the team set an NCAA scoring record. The Rattlers won the 1960 Orange Blossom Classic over Langston University, 40–26. Childs rushed for two touchdowns in the game, including the first touchdown scored; and also had a 52-yard pass reception. However, the Southern University Jaguars were national black college champions that season. Childs was named captain of the All-SIAC team in 1960. The Pittsburgh Courier named him first-team All American again in 1960, and the Associated Press named Childs an honorable mention Little All-American. Childs was named All-SIAC at offensive halfback that season. He also played in the All-American Bowl.

Childs was also on Florida A&M's track and field team. At the 22nd annual SIAC track and field championship races in 1959, Childs won the 220-yard race and was a member of the 440-yard championship relay team for Florida A&M.

== Professional football ==
=== New York Giants ===
Childs was selected in the 20th round of the 1961 American Football League draft by the Boston Patriots, but his coahes considered the new league unstable and Childs did sign with the Patriots. Instead, he signed as a free agent with the New York Giants, and was on the team's taxi squad 1961. After that, Childs spent two years in military service with the United States Army. He played football while in the Army, leading his teams to two European championships. Childs made the Giants roster in 1964, and then principally played as a kickoff returner and cornerback during his five-year career, at 5 ft 11 in (180 cm) and 186 lb (84 kg).

Childs first NFL season came in 1964 with the Giants. He was considered part of "Emlen's Gremlins", a group of fast young defensive backs coached by Giant Hall of Fame defensive back Emlen Tunnell; but Childs did not keep his cornerback job. He played sparingly at running back that season, with 102 yards on 40 rushing attempts for 2.6 yards per carry average. His principal role in 1964 was as a kickoff returner. Before his 1964 rookie season even began, Childs had a 106-yard kickoff return in an exhibition game against the Minnesota Vikings. Two weeks later in another preseason game, he had a 99-yard kickoff return against Washington.

During the 1964 regular season, Childs returned 34 kickoffs for 987 yards, including a 100-yard return for a touchdown against the Vikings in the next to last game of the season; which was the first kickoff return for a touchdown in the NFL that season. His 29 yards per return average led the NFL, and his 100-yard return was the longest of the year. His 987 yards were second only to Mel Renfro (1,017 yards on 40 returns). He missed the final game of 1964 with a torn shoulder muscle, losing any opportunity to overtake Renfro. He also had six punt returns for 40 yards that year; his only season returning punts.

In 1965, Childs started one game at cornerback, and was no longer used at running back; playing in all 14 games. Again, his principal role was as a kick returner, leading the Giants with 718 yards on 29 returns. In 1966 Childs started 14 games at right cornerback, taking over the job from Dick Lynch, with two interceptions in 1966. He had 34 kickoff returns for 855 yards in 1966. In an early December game against the Cleveland Browns, Childs returned the opening kickoff 90 yards for a touchdown. In 1967, he started 10 games at cornerback. Childs had 29 kickoff returns for 603 yards that season. 1967 was his last season with the Giants.

=== St. Louis Cardinals and Chicago Bears (1968) ===
Childs was traded in mid-August 1968 to the St. Louis Cardinals for an undisclosed future draft choice. The Cardinals released him two weeks later. The Chicago Bears then signed him to play on their taxi-squad. He was activated in late-November 1968 after the Bears' star running back and kick returner Gale Sayers was injured. Childs played in four games for the Chicago Bears, returning eight kickoffs for 291 yards, including an 88-yard return.

In Childs first game with the Bears, he returned one kickoff for 53 yards. The next week he again returned one kickoff, this time for 56 yards. In his third game, on December 8, 1968 in an upset win over the Los Angeles Rams, Bears future Hall of Fame linebacker Dick Butkus caught a kickoff and then handed it to Childs who ran 88 yards to the Rams two yard line before being stopped. In the season's final game, and the last of his NFL career, Childs returned four kickoffs for 71 yards. In July 1969, the Bears announced Childs' retirement.

== Legacy and honors ==
Childs was inducted into the Florida A&M Hall of Fame in 1978. During his career at Florida A&M, the team lost only three games and won multiple national championships.

== Personal life ==
Childs and his wife Jessie have two children. He obtained a master's degree in guidance and counseling from Florida A&M. In 1969, he became the director of student personnel at Bethune-Cookman College (now Bethune-Cookman University) in Daytona Beach, Florida, and vice president of student affairs in 1977. Jessie Childs became a principal at an elementary school in Dayton Beach.

In 1997, Bethune-Cookman honored Childs for his service to generations of students for whom he had been a mentor and support. During the ceremony, T. Eileen Martin, the school's first female student government association president, observed that Childs showed exceptional patience and support to students; and among other things prohibited hazing on campus. She said "'Mr. Childs' contribution to B-CC can not be measure in words . . . but only in the lives of the students who have been enriched, guided and lifted to a commendable level of moral and Christian responsibility'". Childs believed that professional athletes were obliged to set an example for others, and among other things he abstained from alcohol, drugs, and tobacco. Childs retired after 35 years at Bethune-Cookman.
