= 1960 Southern Jaguars football team =

American college football season

1960 Southern Jaguars football

Black college national champion SWAC co-champion
- Conference: Southwestern Athletic Conference
- Record: 9–1 (6–1 SWAC)
- Head coach: Ace Mumford (25th season)
- Home stadium: University Stadium

1960 Southwestern Athletic Conference football standings
	Conf.					Overall
Team	W		L		T	W		L		T
Prairie View A&M +	6	–	1	–	0	10	–	1	–	0
Grambling +	6	–	1	–	0	9	–	1	–	0
No. 7 Southern +	6	–	1	–	0	9	–	1	–	0
Jackson State	4	–	3	–	0	6	–	4	–	0
Arkansas AM&N	3	–	4	–	0	6	–	4	–	0
Texas Southern	2	–	5	–	0	4	–	6	–	0
Wiley	1	–	6	–	0	2	–	7	–	0
Texas College	0	–	7	–	0	1	–	9	–	0
+ – Conference co-champions; Rankings from NAIA poll

The 1960 Southern Jaguars football team was an American football team that represented Southern University in the 1960 college football season. In their 25th season under head coach Ace Mumford, the Jaguars compiled a 9–1 record (6–1 against SWAC opponents), finished in a three-way with Grambling and Prairie View A&M for the SWAC championship, and outscored all opponents by a total of 226 to 79. The team played its home games at University Stadium in Baton Rouge, Louisiana.

The team was selected by the "Pigskin Huddle" ratings of the Associated Negro Press (ANP) as the 1960 black college national champion. Southern finished ahead of second-place Florida A&M, third-place Grambling, and fourth place Prairie View. In selecting a national champion, the ANP noted that Southern's strength of schedule, which included non-conference games against Florida A&M and Tennessee A&I, gave it the edge. Southern also received the W.A. Scott II Memorial Trophy as the national champion.

Quarterback Cyrus Lancaster was selected by the Pittsburgh Courier as the first-team quarterback on its 1960 All-America team. Lineman David Evans and halfback Robert Williams were selected to the second team.

== Schedule ==
Date	Opponent	Rank	Site	Result	Attendance	Source
September 24	vs. Texas Southern		Public School Stadium; Galveston, TX	W 14–0	10,000	
October 1	Grambling		University Stadium; Baton Rouge, LA (rivalry)	W 16–6		
October 8	Kentucky State		University Stadium; Baton Rouge, LA	W 39–6		
October 15	at Arkansas AM&N		Pumphrey Stadium; Pine Bluff, AR	W 26–14		
October 22	Jackson State		University Stadium; Baton Rouge, LA (rivalry)	W 41–0		
October 29	at Texas College		Steer Stadium; Tyler, TX	W 27–6		
November 5	at Tennessee A&I		W.J. Hale Stadium; Nashville, TN	W 7–6	4,500	
November 12	Wiley		University Stadium; Baton Rouge, LA	W 27–12		
November 19	No. 3 Florida A&M		University Stadium; Baton Rouge, LA	W 14–6	23,146	
November 26	at Prairie View A&M	No. 6	Jeppesen Stadium; Houston, TX	L 15–23	14,000	
Rankings from AP Poll released prior to the game
