= 1960 Prairie View A&M Panthers football team =

American college football season

1960 Prairie View A&M Panthers football

SWAC co-champion

Prairie View Bowl, W 19–8 vs. Arkansas AM&N
- Conference: Southwestern Athletic Conference
- Record: 10–1 (6–1 SWAC)
- Head coach: Billy Nicks (12th season)
- Home stadium: Edward L. Blackshear Field; Jeppesen Stadium

1960 Southwestern Athletic Conference football standings
	Conf.					Overall
Team	W		L		T	W		L		T
Prairie View A&M +	6	–	1	–	0	10	–	1	–	0
Grambling +	6	–	1	–	0	9	–	1	–	0
No. 7 Southern +	6	–	1	–	0	9	–	1	–	0
Jackson State	4	–	3	–	0	6	–	4	–	0
Arkansas AM&N	3	–	4	–	0	6	–	4	–	0
Texas Southern	2	–	5	–	0	4	–	6	–	0
Wiley	1	–	6	–	0	2	–	7	–	0
Texas College	0	–	7	–	0	1	–	9	–	0
+ – Conference co-champions; Rankings from NAIA poll

The 1960 Prairie View A&M Panthers football team represented Prairie View A&M College of Texas (now known as Prairie View A&M University) as a member of the Southwestern Athletic Conference (SWAC) during the 1960 college football season. Led by 12th-year head coach Billy Nicks, the Panthers compiled an overall record of 10–1, with a conference record of 6–1, and finished as SWAC co-champion.

== Schedule ==
Date	Opponent	Site	Result	Attendance	Source
September 24	at Jackson State	Alumni Field; Jackson, MS	W 24–12		
October 1	at Texas Southern	Jeppesen Stadium; Houston, TX (rivalry)	W 35–28		
October 8	at Allen*	Hurst Stadium; Columbia, SC	W 9–6	3,000	
October 17	vs. Wiley	Cotton Bowl; Dallas, TX (State Fair Classic)	W 36–15		
October 24	vs. Grambling	State Fair Stadium; Shreveport, LA	L 0–26		
October 29	Arkansas AM&N	Edward L. Blackshear Field; Prairie View, TX	W 17–8		
November 5	Texas College	Edward L. Blackshear Field; Prairie View, TX	W 37–6		
November 12	at Bishop*	Dallas, TX	W 45–15		
November 19	Tennessee A&I*	Edward L. Blackshear Field; Prairie View, TX	W 21–0		
November 26	No. 6 Southern	Jeppesen Stadium; Houston, TX	W 23–15	14,000	
December 31	Arkansas AM&N	Jeppesen Stadium; Houston, TX (Prairie View Bowl)	W 19–8	1,500	
*Non-conference game; Rankings from AP Poll released prior to the game
