= 1960 Wiley Wildcats football team =

American college football season

1960 Wiley Wildcats football
- Conference: Southwestern Athletic Conference
- Record: 2–7 (1–6 SWAC)
- Head coach: Fred T. Long (30th season)
- Home stadium: Wildcat Stadium

1960 Southwestern Athletic Conference football standings
	Conf.					Overall
Team	W		L		T	W		L		T
Prairie View A&M +	6	–	1	–	0	10	–	1	–	0
Grambling +	6	–	1	–	0	9	–	1	–	0
No. 7 Southern +	6	–	1	–	0	9	–	1	–	0
Jackson State	4	–	3	–	0	6	–	4	–	0
Arkansas AM&N	3	–	4	–	0	6	–	4	–	0
Texas Southern	2	–	5	–	0	4	–	6	–	0
Wiley	1	–	6	–	0	2	–	7	–	0
Texas College	0	–	7	–	0	1	–	9	–	0
+ – Conference co-champions; Rankings from NAIA poll

The 1960 Wiley Wildcats football team represented Wiley College as a member of the Southwestern Athletic Conference (SWAC) during the 1960 college football season. Led by 30th-year head coach Fred T. Long, the Wildcats compiled an overall record of 2–7, with a conference record of 1–6, and finished seventh in the SWAC.

== Schedule ==
Date	Opponent	Site	Result	Source
September 24	Bishop*	Wildcat Stadium; Marshall, TX	L 14–21	
October 1	at Alcorn A&M*	Henderson Stadium; Lorman, MS	W 8–0	
October 17	vs. Prairie View A&M	Cotton Bowl; Dallas, TX (State Fair Classic)	L 15–36	
October 22	Arkansas AM&N	Wildcat Stadium; Marshall, TX	L 6–20	
October 29	at Texas Southern	Jeppesen Stadium; Houston, TX	L 12–19	
November 5	Jackson State	Wildcat Stadium; Marshall, TX	L 20–37	
November 12	at Southern	University Stadium; Baton Rouge, LA	L 12–27	
November 19	Grambling	Wildcat Stadium; Marshall, TX	L 19–57	
November 24	at Texas College	Steer Stadium; Tyler, TX	W 19–14	
*Non-conference game
