= 1960 Arkansas AM&N Golden Lions football team =

American college football season

1960 Arkansas AM&N Golden Lions football

Prairie View Bowl, L 8–19 vs. Prairie View A&M
- Conference: Southwestern Athletic Conference
- Record: 6–5 (3–4 SWAC)
- Head coach: Charles Spearman (4th season)
- Home stadium: Pumphrey Stadium

1960 Southwestern Athletic Conference football standings
	Conf.					Overall
Team	W		L		T	W		L		T
Prairie View A&M +	6	–	1	–	0	10	–	1	–	0
Grambling +	6	–	1	–	0	9	–	1	–	0
No. 7 Southern +	6	–	1	–	0	9	–	1	–	0
Jackson State	4	–	3	–	0	6	–	4	–	0
Arkansas AM&N	3	–	4	–	0	6	–	4	–	0
Texas Southern	2	–	5	–	0	4	–	6	–	0
Wiley	1	–	6	–	0	2	–	7	–	0
Texas College	0	–	7	–	0	1	–	9	–	0
+ – Conference co-champions; Rankings from NAIA poll

The 1960 Arkansas AM&N Golden Lions football team represented the Arkansas Agricultural, Mechanical and Normal College (now known as the University of Arkansas at Pine Bluff) as a member of the Southwestern Athletic Conference (SWAC) during the 1960 college football season. Led by fourth-year head coach Charles Spearman, the Golden Lions compiled an overall record of 6–5, with a conference record of 3–4, and finished fifth in the SWAC.

== Schedule ==
Date	Opponent	Site	Result	Attendance	Source
September 17	Alcorn A&M*	Pumphrey Stadium; Pine Bluff, AR	W 34–0		
September 24	at Lincoln (MO)*	Lincoln Field; Jefferson City, MO	W 36–6		
October 1	Texas College	Pumphrey Stadium; Pine Bluff, AR	W 28–8		
October 8	at Jackson State	Alumni Field; Jackson, MS	L 14–27		
October 15	Southern	Pumphrey Stadium; Pine Bluff, AR	L 14–26		
October 22	at Wiley	Wildcat Stadium; Marshall, TX	W 20–6		
October 29	at Prairie View A&M	Edward L. Blackshear Field; Prairie View, TX	L 8–17		
November 5	Philander Smith*^{†}	Pumphrey Stadium; Pine Bluff, AR	W 58–6	10,000	
November 12	at Grambling	Grambling Stadium; Grambling, LA	L 12–33		
November 19	Texas Southern	Pumphrey Stadium; Pine Bluff, AR	W 17–6		
December 31	vs. Prairie View A&M	Jeppesen Stadium; Houston, TX (Prairie View Bowl)	L 8–19	1,500	
*Non-conference game; ^{†}Homecoming
