= 1960 Texas Southern Tigers football team =

American college football season

1960 Texas Southern Tigers football
- Conference: Southwestern Athletic Conference
- Record: 4–6 (2–5 SWAC)
- Head coach: Alexander Durley (12th season)
- Home stadium: Jeppesen Stadium

1960 Southwestern Athletic Conference football standings
	Conf.					Overall
Team	W		L		T	W		L		T
Prairie View A&M +	6	–	1	–	0	10	–	1	–	0
Grambling +	6	–	1	–	0	9	–	1	–	0
No. 7 Southern +	6	–	1	–	0	9	–	1	–	0
Jackson State	4	–	3	–	0	6	–	4	–	0
Arkansas AM&N	3	–	4	–	0	6	–	4	–	0
Texas Southern	2	–	5	–	0	4	–	6	–	0
Wiley	1	–	6	–	0	2	–	7	–	0
Texas College	0	–	7	–	0	1	–	9	–	0
+ – Conference co-champions; Rankings from NAIA poll

The 1960 Texas Southern Tigers football team was an American football team that represented Texas Southern University as a member of the Southwestern Athletic Conference (SWAC) during the 1960 college football season. Led by 12th-year head coach Alexander Durley, the Tigers compiled an overall record of 4–6, with a mark of 2–5 in conference play, and finished sixth in the SWAC.

== Schedule ==
Date	Opponent	Site	Result	Attendance	Source
September 24	vs. Southern	Public School Stadium; Galveston, TX	L 0–14	10,000	
October 1	Prairie View A&M	Jeppesen Stadium; Houston, TX (rivalry)	L 28–35		
October 8	at Paul Quinn*	Waco, TX	W 37–0		
October 15	at Texas College	Steer Stadium; Tyler, TX	W 20–6		
October 22	at Corpus Christi*	Tarpon Field; Corpus Christi, TX	W 8–7		
October 29	Wiley	Jeppesen Stadium; Houston, TX	W 19–12		
November 5	Grambling	Jeppesen Stadium; Houston, TX	L 0–51		
November 12	vs. Jackson State	Ernest F. Ladd Memorial Stadium; Mobile, AL (Claver Classic)	L 26–48		
November 19	at Arkansas AM&N	Pumphrey Stadium; Pine Bluff, AR	L 6–17		
November 26	at Florida A&M*	Bragg Memorial Stadium; Tallahassee, FL	L 8–30		
*Non-conference game
