= 1960 Jackson State Tigers football team =

American college football season

1960 Jackson State Tigers football
- Conference: Southwestern Athletic Conference
- Record: 6–4 (4–3 SWAC)
- Head coach: John Merritt (9th season)
- Home stadium: Alumni Stadium

1960 Southwestern Athletic Conference football standings
	Conf.					Overall
Team	W		L		T	W		L		T
Prairie View A&M +	6	–	1	–	0	10	–	1	–	0
Grambling +	6	–	1	–	0	9	–	1	–	0
No. 7 Southern +	6	–	1	–	0	9	–	1	–	0
Jackson State	4	–	3	–	0	6	–	4	–	0
Arkansas AM&N	3	–	4	–	0	6	–	4	–	0
Texas Southern	2	–	5	–	0	4	–	6	–	0
Wiley	1	–	6	–	0	2	–	7	–	0
Texas College	0	–	7	–	0	1	–	9	–	0
+ – Conference co-champions; Rankings from NAIA poll

The 1960 Jackson State Tigers football team represented Jackson College for Negro Teachers (now known as Jackson State University) as a member of the Southwestern Athletic Conference (SWAC) during the 1960 college football season. Led by ninth-year head coach John Merritt, the Tigers compiled an overall record of 6–4, with a conference record of 4–3, and finished fourth in the SWAC.

== Schedule ==
Date	Opponent	Site	Result	Source
September 24	Prairie View A&M	Alumni Field; Jackson, MS	L 12–24	
October 1	Mississippi Vocational*	Alumni Field; Jackson, MS	W 30–8	
October 8	Arkansas AM&N^{†}	Alumni Field; Jackson, MS	W 27–14	
October 15	at Alcorn A&M	Henderson Stadium; Lorman, MS (rivalry)	W 26–0	
October 22	at Southern	University Stadium; Baton Rouge, LA (rivalry)	L 0–41	
October 30	at Grambling	Grambling Stadium; Grambling, LA	L 12–32	
November 5	at Wiley	Wiley Field; Marshall, TX	W 37–20	
November 12	vs. Texas Southern	Ernest F. Ladd Memorial Stadium; Mobile, AL (Claver Classic)	W 48–26	
November 19	Texas College	Alumni Field; Jackson, MS	W 51–7	
December 3	Tennessee A&I*	Alumni Field; Jackson, MS	L 22–25	
*Non-conference game; ^{†}Homecoming
