= 1960 Grambling Tigers football team =

American college football season

1960 Grambling Tigers football

SWAC co-champion
- Conference: Southwestern Athletic Conference
- Record: 9–1 (6–1 SWAC)
- Head coach: Eddie Robinson (18th season)
- Home stadium: Grambling Stadium

1960 Southwestern Athletic Conference football standings
	Conf.					Overall
Team	W		L		T	W		L		T
Prairie View A&M +	6	–	1	–	0	10	–	1	–	0
Grambling +	6	–	1	–	0	9	–	1	–	0
No. 7 Southern +	6	–	1	–	0	9	–	1	–	0
Jackson State	4	–	3	–	0	6	–	4	–	0
Arkansas AM&N	3	–	4	–	0	6	–	4	–	0
Texas Southern	2	–	5	–	0	4	–	6	–	0
Wiley	1	–	6	–	0	2	–	7	–	0
Texas College	0	–	7	–	0	1	–	9	–	0
+ – Conference co-champions; Rankings from NAIA poll

The 1960 Grambling Tigers football team represented Grambling College (now known as Grambling State University) as a member of the Southwestern Athletic Conference (SWAC) during the 1960 college football season. Led by 18th-year head coach Eddie Robinson, the Tigers compiled an overall record of 9–1 and a mark of 6–1 in conference play, and finished as SWAC co-champion.

== Schedule ==
Date	Opponent	Site	Result	Source
September 18	Bishop*	Grambling Stadium; Grambling, LA	W 61–6	
September 24	at Texas College	Steer Stadium; Tyler, TX	W 66–0	
October 1	at Southern	University Stadium; Baton Rouge, LA (rivalry)	L 6–16	
October 8	Tennessee A&I*	Grambling Stadium; Grambling, LA	W 20–6	
October 15	at Mississippi Vocational*	Magnolia Stadium; Itta Bena, MS	W 65–6	
October 24	vs. Prairie View A&M	State Fair Stadium; Shreveport, LA (rivalry)	W 26–0	
October 30	Jackson State	Grambling Stadium; Grambling, LA	W 32–12	
November 5	at Texas Southern	Jeppesen Stadium; Houston, TX	W 51–0	
November 12	Arkansas AM&N	Grambling Stadium; Grambling, LA	W 33–12	
November 19	at Wiley	Wiley Field; Marshall, TX	W 57–19	
*Non-conference game
