= 1960 Idaho State Bengals football team =

American college football season

1960 Idaho State Bengals football
- Conference: Rocky Mountain Conference
- Record: 6–2 (3–1 RMC)
- Head coach: Babe Caccia (9th season)
- Home stadium: Spud Bowl

1960 Rocky Mountain Conference football standings
	Conf.					Overall
Team	W		L		T	W		L		T
No. 16 Adams State $	4	–	0	–	0	7	–	0	–	1
Idaho State	3	–	1	–	0	6	–	2	–	0
Colorado Mines	3	–	2	–	0	6	–	3	–	0
Colorado State–Greeley	2	–	2	–	1	6	–	3	–	1
Colorado College	1	–	4	–	0	4	–	5	–	0
Western State (CO)	0	–	4	–	1	1	–	7	–	1
$ – Conference champion; Rankings from NAIA poll

The 1960 Idaho State Bengals football team was an American football team that represented Idaho State College (now known as Idaho State University) as a member of the Rocky Mountain Conference (RMC) during the 1960 college football season. In their ninth season under head coach Babe Caccia, the Bengals compiled a 6–2 record, with a mark of 3–1 in conference play, and finished second in the RMC.

== Schedule ==
Date	Opponent	Site	Result	Attendance	Source
September 24	Arizona State–Flagstaff*	Spud Bowl; Pocatello, ID	W 30–10	3,000–4,500	
October 1	at Western State (CO)	Gunnison, CO	W 46–21	3,500	
October 8	Omaha*	Spud Bowl; Pocatello, ID	W 44–6	3,500	
October 15	at Montana State*	Gatton Field; Bozeman, MT	L 9–14	8,000	
October 22	Colorado College	Spud Bowl; Pocatello, ID	W 77–8	2,500	
October 29	at Colorado Mines	Brooks Field; Golden, CO	L 0–7	1,500	
November 5	Colorado State–Greeley	Spud Bowl; Pocatello, ID	W 14–7	2,500	
November 19	at College of Idaho*	Hayman Field; Caldwell, ID	W 33–13	1,500	
*Non-conference game
