= Joe Iacone =

American football player (born 1940)

Profile
- Position: Fullback

Personal information
- Born: 1941 (age 84–85); Wayne, Pennsylvania
- Listed height: 5 ft 8 in (1.73 m)
- Listed weight: 185 lb (84 kg)

Career information
- High school: Radnor High School (PA)
- College: West Chester State
- NFL draft: 1963: 13th round, 171st overall pick

Career history
- Philadelphia Eagles (1963); Boston Patriots (1964); *Offseason and/or practice squad member only

Awards and highlights
- 2× Little All-America (1961, 1962); NCAA Division II rushing champion (1960); 3× First-team All-PSAC (1960–1962); West Chester University Athletic Hall of Fame

Career NFL statistics
- Career rushing yards: 3,983
- Career points: 288
- Rushing avg per game: 139.5

Joseph Iacone (March 15, 1941—September 16, 2026) was a former American football running back. He played college football at West Chester State University from 1960 to 1962 where he was twice named a Little All-America and All-East fullback. He was the leading rusher in NCAA Division II as a sophomore and set career and single-season Pennsylvania State Athletic Conference rushing and scoring records that remained unbroken for two to three decades. He averaged 139.5 yards per game over his three years at West Chester, which ranked second all-time in NCAA Division II history at the time.

== Early life ==
Iacone was born on March 15, 1941. He attended Radnor High School in Radnor Township, Pennsylvania, where he earned high school All-American honors in football, and also participated in track and basketball. In 2003, he was part of the first group of athletes inducted into the Radnor High School Hall of Fame.

== West Chester University ==
Iacone played college football at West Chester State University from 1960 to 1962. He was twice named as one of 11 small college players selected by the Associated Press for its Little All-America team. He received the honor in 1961 and 1962, and was also selected to the All-East team in 1960 and 1961. He also became the third player in Pennsylvania State College Football Conference history to be selected as a first-team all-conference player in three consecutive years: 1960, 1961, and 1962.

Iacone earned the nickname the "Radno Ripper" while playing football at West Chester. He was able to play fullback on both offense and defense. However, he played principally on offense. West Chester coach, Jim Bonder, told reporters in 1962: "We could use Joe both ways, but you can't expect a boy to run the ball 30 times a game and still play defense."

Iacone was later inducted into the West Chester University Athletic Hall of Fame.

=== 1960 season ===
As a sophomore in 1960, Iacone rushed for a school record 1,438 yards in nine games, an average of 160 yards per game. In November 1960, he rushed for 201 yards and scored three touchdowns against Bloomsburg State. Iacone's season rushing total gave him the 1960 NCAA Division II rushing championship.

=== 1961 season ===
As a junior in 1961, Iacone rushed for 1,059 yards. In November 1961, he rushed for 239 yards and two touchdowns in a 21–0 victory over Slippery Rock to lead West Chester to the Pennsylvania State College Football Conference championship. In a story about the game, The New York Times focused on Iacone's performance: "Iacone, a 185-pound junior, carried the ball thirty-three times as West Chester wore down Slippery Rock in the last three quarters." That same month, Sports Illustrated cited Iacone as a small college player who was "good enough to play on any football team." The article stated: "West Chester (Pa.) State Fullback Joe Iacone, for instance, the stubby, broad-armed young man shown above. As a sophomore Iacone crushed the bid of Northeast Missouri's Dale Mills to win his third straight national rushing crown. Last fall he gained nearly a mile (1,438 yards, to be exact), finishing the season with a wild, 199-yard day against Lock Haven."

=== 1962 season ===
As a senior, Iacone broke his own West Chester record with 1,486 rushing yards. In November 1962, the Associated Press reported: "They have a saying at West Chester State College: 'As Iacone goes so will the football team.'" In the December 1962 Cement Bowl, he gained 190 yards and scored two touchdowns to lead West Chester to a 46–12 upset victory over Hofstra University. Prior to the Cement Bowl, The New York Times wrote: "Coach Howdy Myers of Hofstra was chiefly concerned with his team's ability to contain West Chester's mercurial Joe Iacone. This fleet, shifty 185-pound fullback gained 1,270 yards on 196 rushes and scored 16 touchdowns this season."

At the end of his playing career at West Chester, Iacone noted that he regretted that many of the eastern schools refused to play West Chester: "That really bothers me. I wished they played us. Possibly they are just afraid of being beaten."

=== Records set ===
Iacone was West Chester's leading rusher for three straight years. His 1960 rushing yardage was good for the NCAA Division II rushing title, and his 1962 total was a single-season West Chester rushing record that stood for 40 years. His 1960 and 1962 totals still rank as the second and fourth highest total in the school's history. His career total of 3,983 yards was the West Chester record until 1990 and still ranks second best in the school's history.

Iacone also set the Pennsylvania State College Football Conference, now known as the Pennsylvania State Athletic Conference (PSAC), scoring record with 288 points in three seasons, a record that was not broken until 1993. He also tied the conference's single-game scoring record by scoring five touchdowns for 30 points in his final regular season game for West Chester. His 1960 and 1962 rushing totals stood as the best two single-season totals in PSAC history for more than 25 years, finally being exceeded in 1989. He also held the PSAC record for career rushing yardage until 1984.

Iacone averaged 139.5 yards per game over his three years at West Chester, which ranked second all-time in NCAA Division II history at the time.

== Professional football ==
He was drafted 171st overall in the 13th round of the 1963 NFL Draft by the Philadelphia Eagles. He played with the Eagles during the pre-season, but was cut by the team in August 1963. Iacone said at the time, "I was just too small. And I was very nervous and tight. I was just starting to get over my nervousness and I was on my way home." He added, "I think they gave me a fair chance. I just wish I had had more time. ... I'm glad I had the chance because I learned so much more about football." He spent the fall of 1963 playing semi pro football and working in a sporting good store.

Iacone signed with the Boston Patriots of the American Football League in 1964, but was released during training camp

== Teacher and coach ==
In October 1963, Iacone was hired as a physical education teacher in the Penn-Delco School District.

In 1967, Iacone became a teacher and football coach at The Haverford School, an all-boys preparatory school in Haverford, Pennsylvania. After several years, he left teaching to enter the business world. He returned to Haverford in approximately 1988. He retired in June 2008. He died on September 16, 2026.
