= J. R. Bishop =

American football player and coach (1938–2022)

Biographical details
- Born: March 22, 1938; Oakland City, Indiana, U.S.
- Died: June 21, 2022 (aged 84); St. Charles, Illinois, U.S.

Playing career
- 1960: Franklin (IN)

Coaching career (HC unless noted)
- 1982–1995: Wheaton (IL)

Head coaching record
- Overall: 84–43–1
- Tournaments: 1–1 (NCAA D-III playoffs)

Accomplishments and honors

Championships
- 1 CCIW (1995)

Awards
- 2× CCIW Coach of the Year (1991, 1995)

Jarvis Randall Bishop (March 22, 1938 – June 21, 2022) was an American football coach. He served as the head football coach at Wheaton College in Wheaton, Illinois for 14 seasons, from 1982 to 1995, compiling a record of 84–43–1.

== Head coaching record ==
Year	Team	Overall	Conference	Standing	Bowl/playoffs
Wheaton Crusaders (College Conference of Illinois and Wisconsin) (1982–1995)
1982	Wheaton	2–7	2–6	7th	
1983	Wheaton	6–3	5–3	T–3rd	
1984	Wheaton	6–3	5–3	T–3rd	
1985	Wheaton	6–3	6–2	T–2nd	
1986	Wheaton	7–2	6–2	T–2nd	
1987	Wheaton	3–6	2–6	T–7th	
1988	Wheaton	7–2	6–2	T–3rd	
1989	Wheaton	6–3	5–3	4th	
1990	Wheaton	4–5	4–4	T–5th	
1991	Wheaton	7–1–1	6–1–1	T–2nd	
1992	Wheaton	6–3	5–2	3rd	
1993	Wheaton	7–2	6–1	2nd	
1994	Wheaton	7–2	5–2	T–3rd	
1995	Wheaton	10–1	7–0	1st	L NCAA Division III Quarterfinal
Wheaton:		84–43–1	70–37–1		
Total:		84–43–1			
National championship Conference title Conference division title or championship game berth
