= 1960 Los Angeles State Diablos football team =

American college football season

1960 Los Angeles State Diablos football
- Conference: California Collegiate Athletic Association
- Record: 4–3–1 (3–1–1 CCAA)
- Head coach: Leonard Adams (10th season)
- Home stadium: Rose Bowl; East Los Angeles College Stadium

1960 California Collegiate Athletic Association football standings
	Conf.					Overall
Team	W		L		T	W		L		T
No. 9 Fresno State $	5	–	0	–	0	9	–	1	–	0
Long Beach State	3	–	1	–	1	5	–	3	–	1
Los Angeles State	3	–	1	–	1	4	–	3	–	1
UC Santa Barbara	2	–	3	–	0	2	–	5	–	1
Cal Poly	1	–	4	–	0	1	–	5	–	0
San Diego State	0	–	5	–	0	1	–	6	–	1
$ – Conference champion; Cal Poly forfeited cancelled conference games to Los Angeles State and UC Santa Barbara, but this forfeit did not affect overall records of the teams.; Rankings from UPI small college poll

The 1960 Los Angeles State Diablos football team represented Los Angeles State College—now known as California State University, Los Angeles—as a member of the California Collegiate Athletic Association (CCAA) during the 1960 college football season. Led by tenth-year head coach Leonard Adams, the Diablos compiled an overall record of 4–3–1 with a mark of 3–1–1 in conference play, tying for second in the CCAA. Los Angeles State's game with Cal Poly was cancelled following the California Polytechnic State University football team plane crash. The Diablos were awarded a forfeit from the Mustangs in the CCAA standings, but this result was not reflected in the overall records for the teams. Los Angeles State played three home games at the Rose Bowl in Pasadena, California and one home game at East Los Angeles College Stadium in Monterey Park, California.

== Schedule ==
Date	Opponent	Site	Result	Attendance	Source
September 10	Hawaii*	East Los Angeles College Stadium; Monterey Park, CA	L 7–20	7,800	
September 24	at San Diego State	Aztec Bowl; San Diego, CA	W 24–14	9,500	
October 1	at Pepperdine*	Sentinel Field; Inglewood, CA ("Old Shoe" rivalry)	W 27–6		
October 8	UC Santa Barbara	Rose Bowl; Pasadena, CA	W 14–6	3,000	
October 15	at San Francisco State*	Cox Stadium; San Francisco, CA	L 6–35	4,000	
October 22	Fresno State	Rose Bowl; Pasadena, CA	L 13–35		
October 29	at University of Mexico*	Estadio Olímpico Universitario; Mexico City, Mexico	W 40–7		
November 12	Long Beach State^{†}	Rose Bowl; Pasadena, CA	T 3–3	1,527	
*Non-conference game; ^{†}Homecoming

== Team players in the NFL ==
The following Los Angeles State players were selected in the 1961 NFL draft.

Player	Position	Round	Overall	NFL team
Ron Puckett	Tackle	5	70	Detroit Lions
Bob Voight	Defensive tackle	18	239	Minnesota Vikings
