= 1957 Nevada Wolf Pack football team =

American college football season

1957 Nevada Wolf Pack football
- Conference: Far Western Conference
- Record: 1–8 (1–4 FWC)
- Head coach: Gordon McEachron (3rd season)
- Home stadium: Mackay Stadium

1957 Far Western Conference football standings
	Conf.					Overall
Team	W		L		T	W		L		T
San Francisco State $	5	–	0	–	0	7	–	3	–	0
Chico State	4	–	1	–	0	7	–	2	–	0
Humboldt State	3	–	2	–	0	4	–	6	–	0
Sacramento State	2	–	3	–	0	5	–	4	–	0
Nevada	1	–	4	–	0	1	–	8	–	0
Cal Aggies	0	–	5	–	0	1	–	7	–	1
$ – Conference champion

The 1957 Nevada Wolf Pack football team represented the University of Nevada during the 1957 college football season. Nevada competed as a member of the Far Western Conference (FWC). The Wolf Pack were led by third-year head coach Gordon McEachron and played their home games at Mackay Stadium.

== Schedule ==
Date	Opponent	Site	Result	Source
September 20	at Pepperdine*	El Camino Stadium; Torrance, CA	L 12–24	
September 28	Idaho State*	Mackay Stadium; Reno, NV	L 6–40	
October 5	Chico State	Mackay Stadium; Reno, NV	L 19–20	
October 12	at Cal Aggies	Aggie Field; Davis, CA	W 21–13	
October 18	at San Francisco State	Cox Stadium; San Francisco, CA	L 8–21	
October 26	Western State (CO)*^{†}	Mackay Stadium; Reno, NV	L 14–52	
November 2	at Sacramento State	Grant Stadium; Sacramento, CA	L 0–7	
November 9	at Humboldt State	Redwood Bowl; Arcata, CA	L 7–26	
November 16	vs. Arizona State–Flagstaff*	Butcher Field; Sunrise Manor, NV	L 20–26	
*Non-conference game; ^{†}Homecoming
