= 1957 San Francisco State Gators football team =

American college football season

1957 San Francisco State Gators football

FWC champion
- Conference: Far Western Conference
- Record: 7–3 (5–0 FWC)
- Head coach: Joe Verducci (8th season)
- Home stadium: Cox Stadium

1957 Far Western Conference football standings
| | Conf. | | | | | Overall |
| Team | W | | L | | T | W | | L | | T |
|---|---|---|---|---|---|---|---|---|---|---|
| San Francisco State $ | 5 | – | 0 | – | 0 | 7 | – | 3 | – | 0 |
| Chico State | 4 | – | 1 | – | 0 | 7 | – | 2 | – | 0 |
| Humboldt State | 3 | – | 2 | – | 0 | 4 | – | 6 | – | 0 |
| Sacramento State | 2 | – | 3 | – | 0 | 5 | – | 4 | – | 0 |
| Nevada | 1 | – | 4 | – | 0 | 1 | – | 8 | – | 0 |
| Cal Aggies | 0 | – | 5 | – | 0 | 1 | – | 7 | – | 1 |
$ – Conference champion

The 1957 San Francisco State Gators football team represented San Francisco State College—now known as San Francisco State University—as a member of the Far Western Conference (FWC) during the 1957 college football season. Led by eighth-year head coach Joe Verducci, San Francisco State compiled an overall record of 7–3 with a mark of 5–0 in conference play, winning the FWC title for the second consecutive season. For the season the team outscored its opponents 256 to 124. The Gators played home games at Cox Stadium in San Francisco.

== Schedule ==
| Date | Opponent | Site | Result | Attendance | Source |
|---|---|---|---|---|---|
| September 21 | at San Quentin State Prison* | San Quentin Prison (Note: This was the fourth annual game against San Quentin Prison. All of the games were held within the walls of the prison itself.); San Quentin, CA | W 32–13 | | |
| September 28 | at San Diego State* | Aztec Bowl; San Diego, CA | L 13–14 | 8,500 | |
| October 4 | Humboldt State | Cox Stadium; San Francisco, CA | W 28–14 | | |
| October 12 | Fresno State* | Cox Stadium; San Francisco, CA | L 7–27 | 3,000 | |
| October 18 | Nevada | Cox Stadium; San Francisco, CA | W 21–8 | | |
| October 26 | Cal Aggies | Cox Stadium; San Francisco, CA | W 46–0 | | |
| November 1 | at Long Beach State* | Veterans Stadium; Long Beach, CA | W 38–23 | | |
| November 9 | at Sacramento State | Grant Stadium; Sacramento, CA | W 41–6 | | |
| November 16 | at Chico State | College Field; Chico, CA | W 23–6 | | |
| November 22 | Cal Poly* | Cox Stadium; San Francisco, CA | L 7–13 | | |
*Non-conference game
