= 1955 San Francisco State Gators football team =

American college football season

1955 San Francisco State Gators football
- Conference: Far Western Conference
- Record: 5–5 (3–2 FWC)
- Head coach: Joe Verducci (6th season)
- Home stadium: Cox Stadium

1955 Far Western Conference football standings
	Conf.					Overall
Team	W		L		T	W		L		T
Chico State	5	–	0	–	0	7	–	2	–	0
Cal Aggies	3	–	1	–	1	5	–	3	–	1
San Francisco State	3	–	2	–	0	5	–	5	–	0
Humboldt State	2	–	2	–	1	7	–	3	–	1
Nevada	1	–	4	–	0	2	–	5	–	0
Sacramento State	0	–	5	–	0	2	–	6	–	0
No conference champion was named for the 1955 season.

The 1955 San Francisco State Gators football team represented San Francisco State College—now known as San Francisco State University—as a member of the Far Western Conference (FWC) during the 1955 college football season. Led by sixth-year head coach Joe Verducci, San Francisco State compiled an overall record of 5–5 with a mark of 3–2 in conference play, placing third in the FWC. For the season the team outscored its opponents 171 to 142. The Gators played home games at Cox Stadium in San Francisco.

== Schedule ==
Date	Opponent	Site	Result	Attendance	Source
September 17	at San Quentin State Prison*	San Quentin Prison (Note: This was the second of six annual games against San Quentin Prison. All of the games were held within the walls of the prison itself.); San Quentin, CA	W 29–6		
September 23	Fresno State*	Cox Stadium; San Francisco, CA	L 12–20		
September 30	Nevada	Cox Stadium; San Francisco, CA	W 18–7		
October 7	Cal Aggies	Cox Stadium; San Francisco, CA	L 7–27		
October 15	at Chico State	Chico High School Stadium; Chico, CA	L 6–9		
October 21	Humboldt State	Cox Stadium; San Francisco, CA	W 33–13		
October 29	at San Diego State*	Aztec Bowl; San Diego, CA	L 6–7	5,000	
November 5	at Redlands*	Redlands Stadium (Note: This stadium is the predecessor to the current Ted Runner Stadium on the University of Redlands campus, which was opened for the 1968 season); Redlands, CA	W 27–7		
November 12	at Sacramento State	Grant Stadium; Sacramento, CA	W 33–14		
November 18	Cal Poly*	Cox Stadium; San Francisco, CA	L 0–32		
*Non-conference game
