= 1955 Nevada Wolf Pack football team =

American college football season

1955 Nevada Wolf Pack football
- Conference: Far Western Conference
- Record: 2–5 (1–4 FWC)
- Head coach: Gordon McEachron (1st season)
- Home stadium: Mackay Stadium

1955 Far Western Conference football standings
| | Conf. | | | | | Overall |
| Team | W | | L | | T | W | | L | | T |
|---|---|---|---|---|---|---|---|---|---|---|
| Chico State | 5 | – | 0 | – | 0 | 7 | – | 2 | – | 0 |
| Cal Aggies | 3 | – | 1 | – | 1 | 5 | – | 3 | – | 1 |
| San Francisco State | 3 | – | 2 | – | 0 | 5 | – | 5 | – | 0 |
| Humboldt State | 2 | – | 2 | – | 1 | 7 | – | 3 | – | 1 |
| Nevada | 1 | – | 4 | – | 0 | 2 | – | 5 | – | 0 |
| Sacramento State | 0 | – | 5 | – | 0 | 2 | – | 6 | – | 0 |
No conference champion was named for the 1955 season.

The 1955 Nevada Wolf Pack football team represented the University of Nevada during the 1955 college football season. Nevada competed as a member of the Far Western Conference (FWC). The Wolf Pack were led by first-year head coach Gordon McEachron and played their home games at Mackay Stadium.

== Schedule ==
| Date | Opponent | Site | Result | Attendance | Source |
|---|---|---|---|---|---|
| September 30 | at San Francisco State | Cox Stadium; San Francisco, CA | L 7–18 | | |
| October 8 | at Sacramento State | Grant Stadium; Sacramento, CA | W 28–7 | | |
| October 15 | at Fresno State* | Ratcliffe Stadium; Fresno, CA | L 9–42 | 6,454 | |
| October 21 | Cal Aggies | Mackay Stadium; Reno, NV | L 7–26 | | |
| October 29 | Chico State | Mackay Stadium; Reno, NV | L 0–47 | | |
| November 5 | Los Angeles State*^{†} | Mackay Stadium; Reno, NV | W 13–12 | | |
| November 11 | at Humboldt State | Redwood Bowl; Arcata, CA | L 6–47 | | |
*Non-conference game; ^{†}Homecoming
