= 1960 Chico State Wildcats football team =

American college football season

1960 Chico State Wildcats football
- Conference: Far Western Conference
- Record: 6–4 (2–3 FWC)
- Head coach: George Maderos (3rd season)
- Home stadium: College Field

1960 Far Western Conference football standings
| | Conf. | | | | | Overall |
| Team | W | | L | | T | W | | L | | T |
|---|---|---|---|---|---|---|---|---|---|---|
| No. 2/3 Humboldt State $ | 5 | – | 0 | – | 0 | 11 | – | 1 | – | 0 |
| San Francisco State | 4 | – | 1 | – | 0 | 9 | – | 1 | – | 0 |
| Chico State | 2 | – | 3 | – | 0 | 6 | – | 4 | – | 0 |
| Sacramento State | 2 | – | 3 | – | 0 | 5 | – | 5 | – | 0 |
| Nevada | 2 | – | 3 | – | 0 | 3 | – | 6 | – | 0 |
| UC Davis | 0 | – | 5 | – | 0 | 0 | – | 8 | – | 1 |
$ – Conference champion; Rankings from NAIA poll and AP small college poll

The 1960 Chico State Wildcats football team represented Chico State College—now known as California State University, Chico—as a member of the Far Western Conference (FWC) during the 1960 college football season. Led by third-year head coach George Maderos, Chico State compiled an overall record of 6–4 with a mark of 2–3 in conference play, placing in a three-way tie for third in the FWC. The team outscored its opponents 163 to 146 for the season. The Wildcats played home games at College Field in Chico, California.

== Schedule ==
| Date | Opponent | Site | Result | Attendance | Source |
|---|---|---|---|---|---|
| September 17 | Pepperdine* | College Field; Chico, CA | W 22–6 | 4,300 | |
| September 24 | at Southern Oregon* | Fuller Field; Ashland, OR | W 26–6 | 2,500 | |
| October 1 | Nevada | College Field; Chico, CA | W 12–9 | 5,300 | |
| October 8 | at La Verne* | Bonita High School?; La Verne, CA | W 35–2 | 250 | |
| October 15 | Linfield* | College Field; Chico, CA | L 14–16 | 6,500 | |
| October 22 | at Sacramento State | Charles C. Hughes Stadium; Sacramento, CA | L 9–13 | 4,000 | |
| October 29 | Long Beach State* | College Field; Chico, CA | W 18–17 | 3,000 | |
| November 5 | at Humboldt State | Redwood Bowl; Arcata, CA | L 6–33 | 7,000–7,500 | |
| November 12 | UC Davis | College Field; Chico, CA | W 14–12 | | |
| November 19 | at San Francisco State | Cox Stadium; San Francisco, CA | L 7–32 | 4,000 | |
*Non-conference game
