= 1960 Long Beach State 49ers football team =

American college football season

1960 Long Beach State 49ers football
- Conference: California Collegiate Athletic Association
- Record: 5–3–1 (3–1–1 CCAA)
- Head coach: Don Reed (3rd season)
- Home stadium: Veterans Memorial Stadium

1960 California Collegiate Athletic Association football standings
	Conf.					Overall
Team	W		L		T	W		L		T
No. 9 Fresno State $	5	–	0	–	0	9	–	1	–	0
Long Beach State	3	–	1	–	1	5	–	3	–	1
Los Angeles State	3	–	1	–	1	4	–	3	–	1
UC Santa Barbara	2	–	3	–	0	2	–	5	–	1
Cal Poly	1	–	4	–	0	1	–	5	–	0
San Diego State	0	–	5	–	0	1	–	6	–	1
$ – Conference champion; Cal Poly forfeited cancelled conference games to Los Angeles State and UC Santa Barbara, but this forfeit did not affect overall records of the teams.; Rankings from UPI small college poll

The 1960 Long Beach State 49ers football team represented Long Beach State College—now known as California State University, Long Beach—as a member of the California Collegiate Athletic Association (CCAA) during the 1960 college football season. Led by third-year head coach Don Reed, the 49ers compiled an overall record of 5–3–1 with a mark of 3–1–1 in conference play, tying for second in the CCAA. The team played home games at Veterans Memorial Stadium adjacent to the campus of Long Beach City College in Long Beach, California.

== Schedule ==
Date	Time	Opponent	Site	Result	Attendance	Source
September 24	2:00 pm	at San Francisco State*	Cox Stadium; San Francisco, CA	L 0–20	3,100–4,000	
October 1	8:00 pm	at Sacramento State*	Charles C. Hughes Stadium; Sacramento, CA	W 14–0	3,336	
October 8	8:00 pm	San Diego State	Veterans Memorial Stadium; Long Beach, CA	W 28–0	3,946–5,000	
October 14	8:00 pm	UC Santa Barbara	Veterans Memorial Stadium; Long Beach, CA	W 23–8	3,749	
October 22	8:00 pm	Cal Poly	Veterans Memorial Stadium; Long Beach, CA	W 36–12	3,000–4,950	
October 29	8:00 pm	at Chico State*	College Field; Chico, CA	L 17–18	3,000	
November 5	8:00 pm	at No. 8 Fresno State	Ratcliffe Stadium; Fresno, CA	L 3–21	5,194	
November 12	2:00 pm	at Los Angeles State	Rose Bowl; Pasadena, CA	T 3–3	1,527	
November 19	8:00 pm	Pepperdine*^{†}	Veterans Memorial Stadium; Long Beach, CA	W 15–8	4,135	
*Non-conference game; ^{†}Homecoming; Rankings from AP Poll released prior to the game
