= 1960 UC Santa Barbara Gauchos football team =

American college football season

1960 UC Santa Barbara Gauchos football
- Conference: California Collegiate Athletic Association
- Record: 2–5–1 (2–3 CCAA)
- Head coach: Bill Hammer (1st season)
- Home stadium: La Playa Stadium

1960 California Collegiate Athletic Association football standings
	Conf.					Overall
Team	W		L		T	W		L		T
No. 9 Fresno State $	5	–	0	–	0	9	–	1	–	0
Long Beach State	3	–	1	–	1	5	–	3	–	1
Los Angeles State	3	–	1	–	1	4	–	3	–	1
UC Santa Barbara	2	–	3	–	0	2	–	5	–	1
Cal Poly	1	–	4	–	0	1	–	5	–	0
San Diego State	0	–	5	–	0	1	–	6	–	1
$ – Conference champion; Cal Poly forfeited cancelled conference games to Los Angeles State and UC Santa Barbara, but this forfeit did not affect overall records of the teams.; Rankings from UPI small college poll

The 1960 UC Santa Barbara Gauchos football team represented University of California, Santa Barbara (UCSB) as a member of the California Collegiate Athletic Association (CCAA) during the 1960 college football season. Led by first-year head coach Bill Hammer, the Gauchos compiled an overall record of 2–5–1 with a mark of 2–3 in conference play, placing fourth in the CCAA. UC Santa Barbara's game with Cal Poly was cancelled following the California Polytechnic State University football team plane crash. The Gauchos were awarded a forfeit from the Mustangs in the CCAA standings, but this result was not reflected in the overall records for the teams. UC Santa Barbara played home games at La Playa Stadium in Santa Barbara, California.

== Schedule ==
Date	Opponent	Site	Result	Attendance	Source
September 16	San Francisco State*	La Playa Stadium; Santa Barbara, CA	L 0–14	6,000–7,500	
September 24	at Whittier*	Hadley Field; Whittier, CA	L 8–14	3,500	
September 30	Fresno State	La Playa Stadium; Santa Barbara, CA	L 15–33	5,000	
October 8	at Los Angeles State	Rose Bowl; Pasadena, CA	L 6–14	3,000	
October 14	at Long Beach State	Veterans Memorial Stadium; Long Beach, CA	L 8–23	3,749–3,950	
October 22	San Diego State	La Playa Stadium; Santa Barbara, CA	W 8–6	7,000	
October 28	at Occidental*	D.W. Patterson Field; Los Angeles, CA	W 26–8	2,500	
November 5	vs. UC Davis (Note: The game against UC Davis was part of an "All-UC Doubleheader" that was held annually from 1948 to 1963. The other game of the double-header was California vs. UCLA. The games were always held at the home stadium of either Cal or UCLA.)*	California Memorial Stadium; Berkeley, CA	T 6–6	1,200	
*Non-conference game
