= 1955 Cal Poly Mustangs football team =

American college football season

1955 Cal Poly Mustangs football
- Conference: California Collegiate Athletic Association
- Record: 7–3 (1–1 CCAA)
- Head coach: LeRoy Hughes (6th season)
- Home stadium: Mustang Stadium

1955 California Collegiate Athletic Association football standings
	Conf.					Overall
Team	W		L		T	W		L		T
Fresno State $	2	–	0	–	0	9	–	1	–	0
Cal Poly	1	–	1	–	0	7	–	3	–	0
San Diego State	0	–	2	–	0	2	–	8	–	0
$ – Conference champion

The 1955 Cal Poly Mustangs football team represented California Polytechnic State College—now known as California Polytechnic State University, San Luis Obispo—as a member of the California Collegiate Athletic Association (CCAA) during the 1955 college football season. Led by sixth-year head coach LeRoy Hughes, Cal Poly compiled an overall record of 7–3 with a mark of 1–1 in conference play, placing second in the CCAA. The team outscored its opponents 225 to 126 for the season. The Mustangs played home games at Mustang Stadium in San Luis Obispo, California.

== Schedule ==
Date	Time	Opponent	Site	Result	Attendance	Source
September 17		Western State (CO)*	Gunnison, CO	W 40–18		
September 24		at Humboldt State*	Redwood Bowl; Arcata, CA	W 26–0	4,000	
October 1		at San Diego State	Aztec Bowl; San Diego, CA	W 12–6	8,000	
October 8		Santa Barbara*	Mustang Stadium; San Luis Obispo, CA	W 19–6		
October 15		San Diego Marines (Note: The Marine Corps Recruit Depot (MCRD) in San Diego fielded a team that played against colleges and other military teams from 1922 to 1964.)*	Mustang Stadium; San Luis Obispo, CA	W 44–12		
October 22		McMurry*^{†}	Mustang Stadium; San Luis Obispo, CA	L 13–23	6,000	
October 29		at Midwestern State (TX)*	Cullum Stadium; Wichita Falls, TX	W 19–7		
November 5		at San Jose State*	Spartan Stadium; San Jose, CA	L 14–20	8,500	
November 11	8:30 p.m.	Fresno State	Mustang Stadium; San Luis Obispo, CA	L 6–34	6,000–7,500	
November 18		at San Francisco State*	Cox Stadium; San Francisco, CA	W 32–0		
*Non-conference game; ^{†}Homecoming; All times are in Pacific time

== Team players in the NFL ==
The following were selected in the 1956 NFL draft.

Player	Position	Round	Overall	NFL team
Jim Cox	End	9	99	San Francisco 49ers
