= 1955 Cal Aggies football team =

American college football season

1955 Cal Aggies football
- Conference: Far Western Conference
- Record: 5–3–1 (3–1–1 FWC)
- Head coach: Ted Forbes (6th season)
- Captain: Duane Damron
- Home stadium: Aggie Field

1955 Far Western Conference football standings
	Conf.					Overall
Team	W		L		T	W		L		T
Chico State	5	–	0	–	0	7	–	2	–	0
Cal Aggies	3	–	1	–	1	5	–	3	–	1
San Francisco State	3	–	2	–	0	5	–	5	–	0
Humboldt State	2	–	2	–	1	7	–	3	–	1
Nevada	1	–	4	–	0	2	–	5	–	0
Sacramento State	0	–	5	–	0	2	–	6	–	0
No conference champion was named for the 1955 season.

The 1955 Cal Aggies football team represented the College of Agriculture at Davis—now known as the University of California, Davis—as a member of the Far Western Conference (FWC) during the 1955 college football season. Led by Ted Forbes, who returned for his six and final season as head coach after having helmed the team from 1949 to 1953, the Aggies compiled an overall record of 5–3–1 with a mark of 3–1–1 in conference play, placing second in the FWC. The team outscored its opponents 128 to 79 for the season. The Cal Aggies played home games at Aggie Field in Davis, California.

In six seasons under Forbes, the Cal Aggies compiled an overall record of 21–29–2, for a winning percentage of .423. His teams won the FWC title in 1949 and 1951 and appeared in a postseason bowl game, the Pear Bowl, in both of those seasons.

== Schedule ==
Date	Opponent	Site	Result	Source
September 17	at Pacific (OR)*	Tom Reynolds Field; Forest Grove, OR	W 7–0	
September 23	California JV (Note: The University of California JV team was commonly known as the "Cal Ramblers".)*	Aggie Field; Davis, CA	L 6–7	
October 1	at Humboldt State	Redwood Bowl; Arcata, CA	T 7–7	
October 7	at San Francisco State	Cox Stadium; San Francisco, CA	W 27–7	
October 15	Sacramento State	Aggie Field; Davis, CA (rivalry)	W 29–0	
October 21	at Nevada	Mackay Stadium (Note: This stadium is the predecessor to the current Mackay Stadium, which was opened for the 1966 season.); Reno, NV	W 26–7	
October 29	vs. Santa Barbara (Note: The game against Santa Barbara was part of an "All-UC Doubleheader" that was held annually from 1948 to 1963. The other game of the double-header was California vs. UCLA. The games were always held at the home stadium of either Cal or UCLA.)*	Los Angeles Memorial Coliseum; Los Angeles, CA	W 7–0	
November 4	Occidental*	Aggie Field; Davis, CA	L 6–30	
November 11	Chico State	Aggie Field; Davis, CA	L 13–21	
*Non-conference game
