= 1957 Chico State Wildcats football team =

American college football season

1957 Chico State Wildcats football
- Conference: Far Western Conference
- Record: 7–2 (4–1 FWC)
- Head coach: Gus Manolis (4th season)
- Home stadium: College Field

1957 Far Western Conference football standings
	Conf.					Overall
Team	W		L		T	W		L		T
San Francisco State $	5	–	0	–	0	7	–	3	–	0
Chico State	4	–	1	–	0	7	–	2	–	0
Humboldt State	3	–	2	–	0	4	–	6	–	0
Sacramento State	2	–	3	–	0	5	–	4	–	0
Nevada	1	–	4	–	0	1	–	8	–	0
Cal Aggies	0	–	5	–	0	1	–	7	–	1
$ – Conference champion

The 1957 Chico State Wildcats football team represented Chico State College—now known as California State University, Chico—as a member of the Far Western Conference (FWC) during the 1957 college football season. Led by Gus Manolis in his fourth and final season as head coach, Chico State compiled an overall record of 7–2 with a mark of 4–1 in conference play, placing second in the FWC. The team was outscored its opponents 195 to 109 for the season. The Wildcats played home games at College Field in Chico, California.

Manolis died on January 28, 1958, near Alder Springs, California, after suffering an apparent heart attack while helping with the search for a missing boy in Grindstone Canyon in the Mendocino National Forest. He finished his tenure as Chico State with an overall record of 23–12–1, for a .653 winning percentage.

== Schedule ==
Date	Opponent	Site	Result
September 21	Pacific (OR)*	College Field; Chico, CA	W 48–6
September 28	Pepperdine*	College Field; Chico, CA	W 19–13
October 5	at Nevada	Mackay Stadium (Note: This stadium is the predecessor to the current Mackay Stadium, which was opened for the 1966 season.); Reno, NV	W 20–19
October 12	at Lewis & Clark*	Griswold Stadium; Portland, OR	W 13–8
October 19	Sacramento State	College Field; Chico, CA	W 20–13
October 25	at Los Angeles State*	Rose Bowl; Pasadena, CA	L 13–14
November 2	Humboldt State	College Field; Chico, CA	W 28–7
November 9	at Cal Aggies	Aggie Field; Davis, CA	W 28–6
November 16	San Francisco State	College Field; Chico, CA	L 6–23
*Non-conference game
