= 1957 Fresno State Bulldogs football team =

American college football season

1957 Fresno State Bulldogs football
- Conference: California Collegiate Athletic Association
- Record: 5–5 (1–1 CCAA)
- Head coach: Clark Van Galder (6th season)
- Home stadium: Ratcliffe Stadium

1957 California Collegiate Athletic Association football standings
	Conf.					Overall
Team	W		L		T	W		L		T
Cal Poly $	3	–	0	–	0	8	–	1	–	0
UC Santa Barbara	2	–	1	–	0	6	–	2	–	0
Fresno State	1	–	1	–	0	5	–	5	–	0
Los Angeles State	1	–	1	–	0	5	–	4	–	0
San Diego State	0	–	1	–	0	2	–	7	–	0
Long Beach State	0	–	3	–	0	3	–	5	–	0
$ – Conference champion; The conference championship was unofficial because the six CCAA members did not play a full conference schedule.

The 1957 Fresno State Bulldogs football team represented Fresno State College—now known as California State University, Fresno—as a member of the California Collegiate Athletic Association (CCAA) during the 1957 college football season. Led by sixth-year head coach Clark Van Galder, Fresno State compiled an overall record of 5–5 with a mark of 1–1 in conference play, tying for third place in the CCAA. The Bulldogs played home games at Ratcliffe Stadium on the campus of Fresno City College in Fresno, California.

== Schedule ==
Date	Opponent	Site	Result	Attendance	Source
September 21	Montana State*	Ratcliffe Stadium; Fresno, CA	L 14–27	9,598	
September 28	at Pacific (CA)*	Pacific Memorial Stadium; Stockton, CA	L 12–34	20,500	
October 5	San Diego Marines (Note: The Marine Corps Recruit Depot (MCRD) in San Diego fielded a team that played against colleges and other military teams from 1922 to 1964.)*	Ratcliffe Stadium; Fresno, CA	L 0–53	6,050	
October 12	at San Francisco State*	Cox Stadium; San Francisco, CA	W 27–7	3,000	
October 19	at Cal Poly	Mustang Stadium; San Luis Obispo, CA	L 7–14	7,000	
October 26	at Idaho*	Neale Stadium; Moscow, ID	L 6–20	5,000	
November 3	San Diego State	Ratcliffe Stadium; Fresno, CA (rivalry)	W 27–0	3,761	
November 9	BYU*	Ratcliffe Stadium; Fresno, CA	W 27–14	7,523	
November 16	San Jose State*	Ratcliffe Stadium; Fresno, CA (rivalry)	W 13–6	8,570–9,000	
November 22	at Hawaii*	Honolulu Stadium; Honolulu, HI (rivalry)	W 31–8	10,000	
*Non-conference game

== Team players in the NFL ==
The following were selected in the 1958 NFL draft.

Player	Position	Round	Overall	NFL team
Dean Philpott	Fullback	11	122	Chicago Cardinals
