= Ted Tollner =

American football coach (born 1940)

Biographical details
- Born: Alfred Theodore Tollner; May 29, 1940 (age 86); San Francisco, California, U.S.

Playing career
- 1959–1961: Cal Poly
- Position: Quarterback

Coaching career (HC unless noted)
- 1962: Morro Bay HS (CA) (assistant)
- 1963: Woodside HS (CA) (assistant)
- 1964–1967: Woodside HS (CA)
- 1968–1970: San Mateo (assistant)
- 1971–1972: San Mateo
- 1973–1980: San Diego State (OC)
- 1981: BYU (QB)
- 1982: USC (OC)
- 1983–1986: USC
- 1987–1988: Buffalo Bills (WR)
- 1989–1991: San Diego Chargers (assistant)
- 1992–1993: Los Angeles Rams (QB)
- 1994–2001: San Diego State
- 2002–2003: San Francisco 49ers (QB)
- 2004: San Francisco 49ers (OC)
- 2005: Detroit Lions (OC)
- 2007–2008: San Francisco 49ers (assistant)
- 2009–2010: Oakland Raiders (PGC)

Head coaching record
- Overall: 69–68–1 (college); 15–6 (junior college); 30–4–1 (high school)
- Bowls: 1–3
- Tournaments: 0–1 (California JC large division playoffs)

Accomplishments and honors

Championships
- 1 (Golden Gate) (1971)

Awards
- Pac-10 Coach of the Year (1984); WAC Coach of the Year (1998)
Medal record
Men's baseball
Representing United States
Pan American Games
Silver medal – second place	1963 São Paulo	Team

Alfred Theodore Tollner (born May 29, 1940) is an American former football coach. He was the head coach at the University of Southern California (USC) from 1983 to 1986 and San Diego State University (SDSU) from 1994 to 2001, compiling an overall college football record of 69–68–1. Tollner also was an assistant coach in the National Football League (NFL) for 15 seasons, including stints as offensive coordinator for the San Diego Chargers, San Francisco 49ers and Detroit Lions.

== Playing career ==
Tollner attended California Polytechnic State University, San Luis Obispo, where he played quarterback. Tollner was on the 1960 Mustangs team that suffered a plane crash in Toledo, Ohio. He survived the plane crash; however, 22 people of the 45 people on board were killed, including 16 of his teammates.

With the Mustangs from 1959 through 1961, Tollner compiled 2,244 passing yards.

He was later a member of the silver medal-winning U.S. baseball team at the 1963 Pan American Games.

== Coaching career ==
=== High school ===
Tollner's first coaching job was at Morro Bay High School. He served for a year there before moving on to Woodside High School where he worked one year as offensive coordinator before coming head coach.

=== College ===
Tollner then coached at College of San Mateo from 1968 to 1972. He served as the offensive coordinator for San Diego State under Claude Gilbert from 1973 to 1980. He also served as the quarterbacks coach at Brigham Young (BYU) in 1981.

He became offensive coordinator of the USC Trojans football program under head coach John Robinson in 1982, and succeeded to the head coaching position a year later when Robinson stepped down to take an administrative post at the university. During his four-year tenure Tollner compiled a 26–20–1 record. He led the Trojans to the Pacific-10 conference championship in 1984. That team defeated Ohio State in the 1985 Rose Bowl game. He was replaced as the USC head coach by Larry Smith after the 1986 season after going 1–3 in the UCLA–USC rivalry and 0–4 vs. Notre Dame in the Notre Dame–USC rivalry.

In 1994, he returned to San Diego State, this time as the head coach. He coached there for eight years. Tollner was known for scheduling a tough non-conference schedule including schools like Washington, Wisconsin, USC, Arizona, Arizona State and Oklahoma. His Aztec teams posted eight-win seasons in 1995 and 1996, the first time it reached that level in consecutive years since 1977. In 1998, his Aztecs posted a 7–1 conference record (7–5 overall), grabbed a share of the conference championship, and earned a trip to the Las Vegas Bowl. Overall, he led the Aztecs to a 43–48 record until his firing in 2001.

=== NFL ===
Tollner served as the wide receivers coach for the Buffalo Bills from 1987 to 1988. He served as the offensive coordinator for the San Diego Chargers from 1989 to 1991. He served as the quarterbacks coach for the Los Angeles Rams from 1992 to 1993. In 2002, he then became the quarterbacks coach for the San Francisco 49ers. After two successful seasons, he was promoted to offensive coordinator in 2004. When Dennis Erickson was fired as head coach, he was not retained. In 2005, he became the offensive coordinator of the Detroit Lions. When Steve Mariucci and several of his assistants were fired 11 weeks into the season, Tollner was demoted to tight ends coach for the remainder of the season.

In late 2006, he was listed as a potential candidate for the head coaching opening for the University of San Diego that later went to Ron Caragher.

In late 2007 it was announced that he would serve as offensive assistant for the San Francisco 49ers in a late season attempt to revive the lacking offense. In early 2008 Tollner was named quarterbacks coach/assistant to the head coach for the San Francisco 49ers to get a permanent role in the organization again. On December 30, 2008, Tollner was dismissed from the 49ers along with running backs coach Tony Nathan and offensive coordinator Mike Martz.

On February 4, 2009, Tollner was introduced as a part of the Oakland Raiders' coaching staff as he was named the passing game coordinator of the team. When Hue Jackson was hired as the Raiders head coach he dismissed Tollner and several others from their positions.

In 2011, Tollner announced his retirement from coaching.

== Head coaching record ==
=== College ===
Year	Team	Overall	Conference	Standing	Bowl/playoffs	Coaches^{#}	AP^{°}
USC Trojans (Pacific-10 Conference) (1983–1986)
1983	USC	4–6–1	4–3	4th			
1984	USC	9–3	7–1	1st	W Rose	9	10
1985	USC	6–6	5–3	T–4th	L Aloha		
1986	USC	7–5	5–3	T–4th	L Florida Citrus		
USC:		26–20–1	21–10				
San Diego State Aztecs (Western Athletic Conference) (1994–1998)
1994	San Diego State	4–7	2–6	8th			
1995	San Diego State	8–4	5–3	5th			
1996	San Diego State	8–3	6–2	T–2nd (Pacific)			
1997	San Diego State	5–7	4–4	T–4th (Pacific)			
1998	San Diego State	7–5	7–1	T–1st (Pacific)	L Las Vegas		
San Diego State Aztecs (Mountain West Conference) (1999–2001)
1999	San Diego State	5–6	3–4	T–5th			
2000	San Diego State	3–8	3–4	T–5th			
2001	San Diego State	3–8	2–5	7th			
San Diego State:		43–48	32–29				
Total:		69–68–1					
National championship Conference title Conference division title or championship game berth
^{#}Rankings from final Coaches Poll.; ^{°}Rankings from final AP Poll.

=== Junior college ===
Year	Team	Overall	Conference	Standing	Bowl/playoffs
San Mateo Bulldogs (Golden Gate Conference) (1971–1972)
1971	San Mateo	9–2	6–1	T–1st	L California state large division quarterfinal
1972	San Mateo	6–4	3–4	T–5th	
San Mateo:		15–6	9–5		
Total:		15–6			
National championship Conference title Conference division title or championship game berth
