= 1955 Humboldt State Lumberjacks football team =

American college football season

1955 Humboldt State Lumberjacks football
- Conference: Far Western Conference
- Record: 7–3–1 (2–2–1 FWC)
- Head coach: Phil Sarboe (5th season)
- Home stadium: Redwood Bowl

1955 Far Western Conference football standings
	Conf.					Overall
Team	W		L		T	W		L		T
Chico State	5	–	0	–	0	7	–	2	–	0
Cal Aggies	3	–	1	–	1	5	–	3	–	1
San Francisco State	3	–	2	–	0	5	–	5	–	0
Humboldt State	2	–	2	–	1	7	–	3	–	1
Nevada	1	–	4	–	0	2	–	5	–	0
Sacramento State	0	–	5	–	0	2	–	6	–	0
No conference champion was named for the 1955 season.

The 1955 Humboldt State Lumberjacks football team represented Humboldt State College—now known as California State Polytechnic University, Humboldt—as a member of the Far Western Conference (FWC) during the 1955 college football season. Led by fifth-year head coach Phil Sarboe, the Lumberjacks compiled an overall record of 7–3–1 with a mark of 2–2–1 in conference play, placing fourth in the FWC, and outscored their opponents 254 to 171 for the season. The team played home games at the Redwood Bowl in Arcata, California.

== Schedule ==
Date	Opponent	Site	Result	Attendance	Source
September 17	Moffett Field Air Corps (Note: Naval Air Station Moffett Field was a Naval Air Station from 1933 to 1994.)*	Redwood Bowl; Arcata, CA	W 19–0	3,200	
September 24	Cal Poly*	Redwood Bowl; Arcata, CA	L 0–26	4,000	
October 1	Cal Aggies	Redwood Bowl; Arcata, CA	T 7–7	3,500	
October 8	Naval Air Station Alameda (Note: Naval Air Station Alameda was a Naval Air Station from 1940 to 1997. For many years they fielded a team that played against colleges and other military teams.)*	Redwood Bowl; Arcata, CA	W 14–13		
October 15	at Southern Oregon*	Fuller Field; Ashland, OR	W 34–13		
October 21	at San Francisco State	Cox Stadium; San Francisco, CA	L 13–33		
October 29	Sacramento State^{†}	Redwood Bowl; Arcata, CA	W 39–6	3,000	
November 5	Portland State*	Redwood Bowl; Arcata, CA	W 48–13		
November 11	Nevada	Redwood Bowl; Arcata, CA	W 47–6		
November 19	at Chico State	Chico High School Stadium; Chico, CA	L 7–40		
November 24	Pepperdine*	Redwood Bowl; Arcata, CA	W 26–14		
*Non-conference game; ^{†}Homecoming
