= 1955 Fresno State Bulldogs football team =

American college football season

1955 Fresno State Bulldogs football

CCAA champion
- Conference: California Collegiate Athletic Association
- Record: 9–1 (2–0 CCAA)
- Head coach: Clark Van Galder (4th season)
- Home stadium: Ratcliffe Stadium

1955 California Collegiate Athletic Association football standings
	Conf.					Overall
Team	W		L		T	W		L		T
Fresno State $	2	–	0	–	0	9	–	1	–	0
Cal Poly	1	–	1	–	0	7	–	3	–	0
San Diego State	0	–	2	–	0	2	–	8	–	0
$ – Conference champion

The 1955 Fresno State Bulldogs football team represented Fresno State College—now known as California State University, Fresno—as a member of the California Collegiate Athletic Association (CCAA) during the 1955 college football season. Led by fourth-year head coach Clark Van Galder, Fresno State compiled an overall record of 9–1 with a mark of 2–0 in conference play, winning the CCAA title. The Bulldogs played home games at Ratcliffe Stadium on the campus of Fresno City College in Fresno, California

== Schedule ==
Date	Time	Opponent	Site	Result	Attendance	Source
September 23		at San Francisco State*	Cox Stadium; San Francisco, CA	W 20–12		
October 1		Willamette*	Ratcliffe Stadium; Fresno, CA	W 33–7	7,307	
October 8		San Diego Navy*	Ratcliffe Stadium; Fresno, CA	W 52–0	6,035	
October 15		Nevada*	Ratcliffe Stadium; Fresno, CA	W 42–9	6,454	
October 22		San Diego Marines (Note: The Marine Corps Recruit Depot (MCRD) in San Diego fielded a team that played against colleges and other military teams from 1922 to 1964.)*	Ratcliffe Stadium; Fresno, CA	W 20–0	7,194	
October 29		at Utah State*	Romney Stadium (Note: This stadium is the predecessor to the current Maverik Stadium (Romney Stadium) that has served as the home of the Aggies since 1968); Logan, UT	L 14–39	4,000	
November 5		San Diego State	Ratcliffe Stadium; Fresno, CA (rivalry)	W 20–6	6,228	
November 11	8:30 p.m.	at Cal Poly	Mustang Stadium; San Luis Obispo, CA	W 34–6	6,000–7,500	
November 18		San Jose State*	Ratcliffe Stadium; Fresno, CA (rivalry)	W 19–13	11,145–14,000	
November 26		at Hawaii*	Honolulu Stadium; Honolulu, HI (rivalry)	W 20–18	18,000	
*Non-conference game; All times are in Pacific time
