= LeRoy Hughes =

American football and basketball coach

Biographical details
- Born: November 20, 1905; California, U.S.
- Died: December 7, 1991 (aged 86); San Luis Obispo, California, U.S.

Playing career

Basketball
- 1927–1929: Oregon

Coaching career (HC unless noted)

Football
- 1938–1940: Menlo (backfield)
- 1941–1943: Menlo
- 1946–1949: Menlo
- 1950–1961: Cal Poly

Basketball
- 1938–1944: Menlo
- 1946–1950: Menlo

Administrative career (AD unless noted)
- 1950–1962: Cal Poly

Head coaching record
- Overall: 72–38–1 (college football)

Accomplishments and honors

Championships
- Football; 3 CCAA (1952–1953, 1958)

LeRoy Barry Hughes (November 20, 1905 – December 7, 1991) was an American football and basketball coach and college athletics administrator. He served as the head football coach at Menlo Junior College in Atherton, California (1941–1943, 1946–1949) and California Polytechnic State University in San Luis Obispo, California (1950–1961). He was the head coach at Cal Poly during the California Polytechnic State University football team plane crash in 1960.

Hughes was a member of the University of Oregon men's basketball team from 1927 to 1929. He was hired as athletic director and head football coach at Cal Poly in March 1950.

== Head coaching record ==
=== College football ===
Year	Team	Overall	Conference	Standing	Bowl/playoffs	UPI small college^{#}
Cal Poly Mustangs (California Collegiate Athletic Association) (1950–1961)
1950	Cal Poly	3–7	0–4	5th		
1951	Cal Poly	5–4–1	2–1–1	T–2nd		
1952	Cal Poly	7–3	4–0	1st		
1953	Cal Poly	9–0	5–0	1st		
1954	Cal Poly	6–4	3–1	2nd		
1955	Cal Poly	7–3	1–1	2nd		
1956	Cal Poly	7–3	1–2	5th		
1957	Cal Poly	8–1	3–0	1st		
1958	Cal Poly	9–1	4–1	T–1st		15
1959	Cal Poly	6–3	3–2	T–2nd		
1960	Cal Poly	1–5	1–2	4th		
1961	Cal Poly	4–4	3–2	2nd		
Cal Poly:		72–38–1	30–16–1			
Total:		72–38–1				
National championship Conference title Conference division title or championship game berth
