= 1960 Sacramento State Hornets football team =

American college football season

1960 Sacramento State Hornets football
- Conference: Far Western Conference
- Record: 5–5 (2–3 FWC)
- Head coach: John W. Baker (4th season)
- Home stadium: Charles C. Hughes Stadium

1960 Far Western Conference football standings
	Conf.					Overall
Team	W		L		T	W		L		T
No. 2/3 Humboldt State $	5	–	0	–	0	11	–	1	–	0
San Francisco State	4	–	1	–	0	9	–	1	–	0
Chico State	2	–	3	–	0	6	–	4	–	0
Sacramento State	2	–	3	–	0	5	–	5	–	0
Nevada	2	–	3	–	0	3	–	6	–	0
UC Davis	0	–	5	–	0	0	–	8	–	1
$ – Conference champion; Rankings from NAIA poll and AP small college poll

The 1960 Sacramento State Hornets football team represented Sacramento State College—now known as California State University, Sacramento—as a member of the Far Western Conference (FWC) during the 1960 college football season. Led by John W. Baker in his fourth and final season as head coach, Sacramento State compiled an overall record of 5–5 with a mark of 2–3 in conference play, tying for third place in the FWC. For the season the team outscored its opponents 163 to 132. The Hornets played home games at Charles C. Hughes Stadium in Sacramento, California.

== Schedule ==
Date	Opponent	Site	Result	Attendance	Source
September 17	vs. Southern Oregon*	Myrtle Bowl; Coos Bay, OR	W 39–14		
September 24	Occidental*	Charles C. Hughes Stadium; Sacramento, CA	W 33–6		
October 1	Long Beach State*	Charles C. Hughes Stadium; Sacramento, CA	L 0–14	3,336	
October 8	at Santa Clara*	Buck Shaw Stadium; Santa Clara, CA	W 14–8		
October 15	No. 7 Humboldt State	Albee Stadium; Eureka, CA	L 9–33	5,000	
October 22	Chico State	Charles C. Hughes Stadium; Sacramento, CA	W 13–9		
October 29	Cal Poly Pomona*	Charles C. Hughes Stadium; Sacramento, CA	L 18–19	1,500	
November 5	at Nevada	Mackay Stadium (Note: This stadium is the predecessor to the current Mackay Stadium, which was opened for the 1966 season.); Reno, NV	L 0–15	6,500	
November 11	at San Francisco State	Cox Stadium; San Francisco, CA	L 6–14	1,500	
November 19	UC Davis	Charles C. Hughes Stadium; Sacramento, CA (rivalry)	W 31–0	3,814	
*Non-conference game; Rankings from AP Poll released prior to the game
