= 1957 Humboldt State Lumberjacks football team =

American college football season

1957 Humboldt State Lumberjacks football
- Conference: Far Western Conference
- Record: 4–6 (3–2 FWC)
- Head coach: Phil Sarboe (7th season)
- Home stadium: Redwood Bowl

1957 Far Western Conference football standings
| | Conf. | | | | | Overall |
| Team | W | | L | | T | W | | L | | T |
|---|---|---|---|---|---|---|---|---|---|---|
| San Francisco State $ | 5 | – | 0 | – | 0 | 7 | – | 3 | – | 0 |
| Chico State | 4 | – | 1 | – | 0 | 7 | – | 2 | – | 0 |
| Humboldt State | 3 | – | 2 | – | 0 | 4 | – | 6 | – | 0 |
| Sacramento State | 2 | – | 3 | – | 0 | 5 | – | 4 | – | 0 |
| Nevada | 1 | – | 4 | – | 0 | 1 | – | 8 | – | 0 |
| Cal Aggies | 0 | – | 5 | – | 0 | 1 | – | 7 | – | 1 |
$ – Conference champion

The 1957 Humboldt State Lumberjacks football team represented Humboldt State College—now known as California State Polytechnic University, Humboldt—as a member of the Far Western Conference (FWC) during the 1957 college football season. Led by seventh-year head coach Phil Sarboe, the Lumberjacks compiled an overall record of 4–6 with a mark of 3–2 in conference play, placing third in the FWC, and were outscored by their opponents 185 to 179 for the season. Humboldt State played home games at the Redwood Bowl in Arcata, California.

1957 was the only losing season for the Lumberjacks during Sarboe's 15-year tenure as head coach.

== Schedule ==
| Date | Opponent | Site | Result | Attendance | Source |
|---|---|---|---|---|---|
| September 14 | Seattle Ramblers (club team)* | Redwood Bowl; Arcata, CA | L 0–12 | | |
| September 21 | at College of Idaho* | Hayman Field; Caldwell, ID | L 14–20 | | |
| September 28 | Hawaii* | Redwood Bowl; Arcata, CA | L 0–26 | 5,000 | |
| October 4 | at San Francisco State | Cox Stadium; San Francisco, CA | L 14–28 | | |
| October 12 | Sacramento State | Redwood Bowl; Arcata, CA | W 27–19 | | |
| October 19 | Cal Aggies | Redwood Bowl; Arcata, CA | W 25–0 | | |
| November 2 | at Chico State | College Field; Chico, CA | L 7–28 | | |
| November 9 | Nevada | Redwood Bowl; Arcata, CA | W 26–7 | | |
| November 16 | Southern Oregon* | Redwood Bowl; Arcata, CA | W 39–14 | | |
| November 28 | Lewis & Clark* | Redwood Bowl; Arcata, CA | L 27–31 | | |
*Non-conference game
