= 1960 Nevada Wolf Pack football team =

American college football season

1960 Nevada Wolf Pack football
- Conference: Far Western Conference
- Record: 3–6 (2–3 FWC)
- Head coach: Dick Trachok (2nd season)
- Home stadium: Mackay Stadium

1960 Far Western Conference football standings
	Conf.					Overall
Team	W		L		T	W		L		T
No. 2/3 Humboldt State $	5	–	0	–	0	11	–	1	–	0
San Francisco State	4	–	1	–	0	9	–	1	–	0
Chico State	2	–	3	–	0	6	–	4	–	0
Sacramento State	2	–	3	–	0	5	–	5	–	0
Nevada	2	–	3	–	0	3	–	6	–	0
UC Davis	0	–	5	–	0	0	–	8	–	1
$ – Conference champion; Rankings from NAIA poll and AP small college poll

The 1960 Nevada Wolf Pack football team represented the University of Nevada during the 1960 college football season. Nevada competed as a member of the Far Western Conference (FWC). The Wolf Pack were led by second-year head coach Dick Trachok and played their home games at Mackay Stadium.

== Schedule ==
Date	Opponent	Site	Result	Attendance	Source
September 24	Pepperdine*	Mackay Stadium; Reno, NV	W 25–8	5,000	
October 1	at Chico State	College Field; Chico, CA	L 9–12		
October 8	Cal Poly Pomona*	Mackay Stadium; Reno, NV	L 6–20	2,000–3,500	
October 15	UC Davis	Mackay Stadium; Reno, NV	W 40–22	3,000	
October 22	at San Francisco State	Cox Stadium; San Francisco, CA	L 7–18	5,000	
October 29	at Portland State*	Multnomah Stadium; Portland, OR	L 7–14		
November 5	Sacramento State^{†}	Mackay Stadium; Reno, NV	W 15–0	6,500	
November 12	No. 9 Humboldt State	Mackay Stadium; Reno, NV	L 6–22	1,000–2,500	
November 19	at Colorado State–Greeley*	Jackson Field; Greeley, CO	L 6–37		
*Non-conference game; ^{†}Homecoming; Rankings from AP Poll released prior to the game
