= 1957 Cal Poly Mustangs football team =

American college football season

1957 Cal Poly Mustangs football

CCAA champion (unofficial)
- Conference: California Collegiate Athletic Association
- Record: 8–1 (3–0 CCAA)
- Head coach: LeRoy Hughes (8th season)
- Home stadium: Mustang Stadium

1957 California Collegiate Athletic Association football standings
	Conf.					Overall
Team	W		L		T	W		L		T
Cal Poly $	3	–	0	–	0	8	–	1	–	0
UC Santa Barbara	2	–	1	–	0	6	–	2	–	0
Fresno State	1	–	1	–	0	5	–	5	–	0
Los Angeles State	1	–	1	–	0	5	–	4	–	0
San Diego State	0	–	1	–	0	2	–	7	–	0
Long Beach State	0	–	3	–	0	3	–	5	–	0
$ – Conference champion; The conference championship was unofficial because the six CCAA members did not play a full conference schedule.

The 1957 Cal Poly Mustangs football team represented California Polytechnic State College—now known as California Polytechnic State University, San Luis Obispo—as a member of the California Collegiate Athletic Association (CCAA) during the 1957 college football season. Led by eighth-year head coach LeRoy Hughes, Cal Poly compiled an overall record of 8–1 with a mark of 3–0 in conference play, winning an unofficial conference title. The CCAA championship was unofficial because the conference's six members did not play a full conference schedule. Cal Poly outscored its opponents 210 to 108 for the season. The Mustangs played home games at Mustang Stadium in San Luis Obispo, California.

== Schedule ==
Date	Opponent	Site	Result	Attendance	Source
September 21	Linfield*	Mustang Stadium; San Luis Obispo, CA	W 32–7		
September 28	at New Mexico A&M*	Memorial Stadium (Note: This stadium is the predecessor to the current Memorial Stadium on the New Mexico State campus, which was opened for the 1978 season); Las Cruces, NM	W 10–8		
October 12	Pepperdine*	Mustang Stadium; San Luis Obispo, CA	W 32–18		
October 19	Fresno State	Mustang Stadium; San Luis Obispo, CA	W 14–7	7,000	
November 2	San Jose State*	Mustang Stadium; San Luis Obispo, CA	W 14–7		
November 9	San Diego Marines (Note: The Marine Corps Recruit Depot (MCRD) in San Diego fielded a team that played against colleges and other military teams from 1922 to 1964.)*	?; San Diego, CA	L 14–27		
November 15	at Long Beach State*	Veterans Stadium; Long Beach, CA	W 41–7		
November 22	at San Francisco State*	Cox Stadium; San Francisco, CA	W 13–7		
November 28 (Note: The game against UC Santa Barbara was rescheduled from October 27.)	UC Santa Barbara	Mustang Stadium; San Luis Obispo, CA	W 40–20	5,000	
*Non-conference game

== Team players in the NFL ==
The following were selected in the 1958 NFL draft.

Player	Position	Round	Overall	NFL team
John Madden	Tackle	21	244	Philadelphia Eagles
