= List of Chico State Wildcats head football coaches =

The Chico State Wildcats college football team represented California State University, Chico. The Wildcats competed in the California Coast Conference from 1922–1928. They moved to the Far West Conference in 1929, staying in the conference until the end of the football program in 1996. It had been renamed the Northern California Athletic Conference in 1983. The team played in the (NCAA) College Division, then NCAA Division II.

The program had 14 identifiable head coaches in its 74 years of competitive existence. Prior to World War I, Chico State played sporadic games against local High Schools.

== Coaches ==
No.	Coach	Tenure	Seasons	Win	Loss	Tie	Pct.	Bowls
	(no coach)	1920 (Note: There was no coach for the first three games of the 1920 season.)	1/2	1	2	0	.333	0
1	Luther Clements	1920 (Note: Clements only coached the last three games of the 1920 season.)	1/2	2	1	0	.667	0
2	George Sperry	1921–1922	2	9	6	1	.594	0
3	Art Acker	1923–1937	15	53	59	8	.475	0
4	Roy Bohler (totals included on line 6)	1938						
5	Hubert J. McCormick	1939	1	2	4	2	.375	0
6	Roy Bohler	1940–1949 (no team 1943–1945)	8	24	35	5	.414	0
7	Paul J. Smith	1950–1951	2	2	13	0	.133	0
8	Ernie Busch	1952–1953	2	7	9	1	.441	0
9	Gus Manolis	1954–1957	4	23	12	1	.653	0
10	George Maderos	1958–1967	10	35	59	1	.374	0
11	Pete Riehlman	1968–1973	6	41	20	0	.672	1
12	Dick Trimmer	1974–1983	10	48	52	2	.480	0
13	Mike Bellotti	1984–1988	5	21	25	2	.458	0
14	Gary Hauser	1989–1995	7	24	40	3	.381	0
15	Rob Tomlinson	1996	1	5	5	0	.500	0
	Totals	1920–199	74	297	341	26	.467	1
