= 1960 San Francisco State Gators football team =

American college football season

1960 San Francisco State Gators football
- Conference: Far Western Conference
- Record: 9–1 (4–1 FWC)
- Head coach: Joe Verducci (11th season)
- Home stadium: Cox Stadium

1960 Far Western Conference football standings
	Conf.					Overall
Team	W		L		T	W		L		T
No. 2/3 Humboldt State $	5	–	0	–	0	11	–	1	–	0
San Francisco State	4	–	1	–	0	9	–	1	–	0
Chico State	2	–	3	–	0	6	–	4	–	0
Sacramento State	2	–	3	–	0	5	–	5	–	0
Nevada	2	–	3	–	0	3	–	6	–	0
UC Davis	0	–	5	–	0	0	–	8	–	1
$ – Conference champion; Rankings from NAIA poll and AP small college poll

The 1960 San Francisco State Gators football team represented San Francisco State College—now known as San Francisco State University—as a member of the Far Western Conference (FWC) during the 1960 college football season. Led by Joe Verducci in his 11th and final year as head coach, San Francisco State compiled an overall record of 9–1 with a mark of 4–1 in conference play, placing second in the FWC. For the season the team outscored its opponents 247 to 47. The Gators played home games at Cox Stadium in San Francisco.

The Gators were dominant through much of the season, allowing touchdown or less in nine of the ten games. Their only loss was to FWC champion Humboldt State. In 11 years under Verducci, the Gators had a record of 74–31, for a winning percentage of .704. Verducci's teams won the conference title six times and they appeared in one bowl game the Pear Bowl in 1950.

== Schedule ==
Date	Time	Opponent	Site	Result	Attendance	Source
September 16		at UC Santa Barbara*	La Playa Stadium; Santa Barbara, CA	W 14–0	6,000–7,500	
September 24		Long Beach State*	Cox Stadium; San Francisco, CA	W 20–0	3,100–4,000	
October 1	8:00 p.m.	at Cal Poly Pomona*	Kellogg Field; Pomona, CA	W 20–0	3,500	
October 8		at Humboldt State	Redwood Bowl; Arcata, CA	L 18–21	7,000	
October 15		Los Angeles State*	Cox Stadium; San Francisco, CA	W 35–6	4,000	
October 22		Nevada	Cox Stadium; San Francisco, CA	W 18–7	5,000	
October 28		at UC Davis	Aggie Field; Davis, CA	W 41–0	2,000–2,200	
November 5		San Diego*	Cox Stadium; San Francisco, CA	W 35–0	4,000	
November 11		Sacramento State	Cox Stadium; San Francisco, CA	W 14–6	1,500	
November 19		Chico State	Cox Stadium; San Francisco, CA	W 32–7	4,000	
*Non-conference game

== Team players in the NFL / AFL ==
The following San Francisco State players were selected in the 1961 NFL draft.

Player	Position	Round	Overall	NFL team
Charley Fuller	Halfback	16	220	San Francisco 49ers

The following San Francisco State players were selected in the 1961 AFL draft.

Player	Position	Round	Overall	AFL team
Charley Fuller	Halfback	19	148	Oakland Raiders

The following player did not play football at San Francisco State, but completed his graduate degree at San Francisco State while playing in the NFL.

Player	Position	Round	Overall	NFL team
Carl Kammerer	Defensive end, linebacker	2	22	San Francisco 49ers
