= 1957 Cal Aggies football team =

American college football season

1957 Cal Aggies football
- Conference: Far Western Conference
- Record: 1–7–1 (0–5 FWC)
- Head coach: Will Lotter (3rd season)
- Captain: Myrel Moore
- Home stadium: Aggie Field

1957 Far Western Conference football standings
	Conf.					Overall
Team	W		L		T	W		L		T
San Francisco State $	5	–	0	–	0	7	–	3	–	0
Chico State	4	–	1	–	0	7	–	2	–	0
Humboldt State	3	–	2	–	0	4	–	6	–	0
Sacramento State	2	–	3	–	0	5	–	4	–	0
Nevada	1	–	4	–	0	1	–	8	–	0
Cal Aggies	0	–	5	–	0	1	–	7	–	1
$ – Conference champion

The 1957 Cal Aggies football team represented the College of Agriculture at Davis—now known as the University of California, Davis—as a member of the Far Western Conference (FWC) during the 1957 college football season. Led by third-year head coach Will Lotter, the Aggies compiled an overall record of 1–7–1 with a mark of 0–5 in conference play, placing last out of six teams in the FWC. The team was outscored by its opponents 210 to 59 for the season and was held to a touchdown or less in six of their nine games. The Cal Aggies played home games at Aggie Field in Davis, California.

== Schedule ==
Date	Opponent	Site	Result
September 21	at Willamette*	McCulloch Stadium; Salem, OR	T 13–13
September 27	California JV (Note: The University of California JV team was commonly known as the "Cal Ramblers".)*	Aggie Field; Davis, CA	W 21–0
October 4	Long Beach State*	Aggie Field; Davis, CA	L 6–12
October 12	Nevada	Aggie Field; Davis, CA	L 13–21
October 19	at Humboldt State	Redwood Bowl; Arcata, CA	L 0–25
October 26	at San Francisco State	Cox Stadium; San Francisco, CA	L 0–46
November 2	vs. UC Santa Barbara (Note: The game against UC Santa Barbara was part of an "All-UC Doubleheader" that was held annually from 1948 to 1963. The other game of the double-header was California vs. UCLA. The games were always held at the home stadium of either Cal or UCLA.)*	Los Angeles Memorial Coliseum; Los Angeles, CA	L 0–39
November 9	Chico State	Aggie Field; Davis, CA	L 6–28
November 15	Sacramento State	Aggie Field; Davis, CA (rivalry)	L 0–26
*Non-conference game
