= Pence Dacus =

American football player and coach (1931–2019)

Biographical details
- Born: July 26, 1931; San Saba, Texas, U.S.
- Died: February 15, 2019 (aged 87)

Playing career

Football
- 1949–1950: Tarleton State
- 1951–1953: Southwest Texas State

Basketball
- 1951–1952: Southwest Texas State
- Position: Quarterback (football)

Coaching career (HC unless noted)

Football
- 1960–1961: Pepperdine

Head coaching record
- Overall: 2–18

Accomplishments and honors

Awards
- First-team Little All-American (1953)

Wilfred Pence Dacus (July 26, 1931 – February 15, 2019) was an American football player and coach. He served as the head football coach at Pepperdine University from 1960 to 1961, compiling a record of 2–18. He began his collegiate playing career at Tarleton State University, where he was a quarterback. Dacus moved on to Southwest Texas State University in San Marcos, Texas, where he lettered in both football and basketball. He was selected 63rd overall by the Detroit Lions in sixth round of the 1954 NFL draft.

Dacus was born on July 26, 1931, in San Saba, Texas. He grew up in San Saba and Brady, Texas. Dacus attended Abilene Christian College—now known as Abilene Christian University—and earned a doctorate degree at the University of Houston.

== Head coaching record ==
Year	Team	Overall	Conference	Standing	Bowl/playoffs
Pepperdine Waves (Independent) (1960–1961)
1960	Pepperdine	1–9			
1961	Pepperdine	1–9			
Pepperdine:		2–18			
Total:		2–18			
