= 1955 San Diego State Aztecs football team =

American college football season

1955 San Diego State Aztecs football
- Conference: California Collegiate Athletic Association
- Record: 2–8 (0–2 CCAA)
- Head coach: Bill Schutte (9th season)
- Home stadium: Aztec Bowl, Balboa Stadium

1955 California Collegiate Athletic Association football standings
	Conf.					Overall
Team	W		L		T	W		L		T
Fresno State $	2	–	0	–	0	9	–	1	–	0
Cal Poly	1	–	1	–	0	7	–	3	–	0
San Diego State	0	–	2	–	0	2	–	8	–	0
$ – Conference champion

The 1955 San Diego State Aztecs football team represented San Diego State College—now known as San Diego State University—as a member of the California Collegiate Athletic Association (CCAA) during the 1955 college football season. Led by Bill Schutte in his ninth and final season as head coach, the Aztecs compiled an overall record of 2–8 with a mark of 0–2 in conference play, placing last out of three teams in the CCAA. The Aztecs were shutout three times, and held to a touchdown or less in eight of ten games. The team was outscored 231 to 65 for the season. San Diego State played home games at Aztec Bowl and Balboa Stadium, both located in San Diego.

== Schedule ==
Date	Opponent	Site	Result	Attendance	Source
September 24	at Pepperdine*	El Camino Stadium; Torrance, CA	L 0–21		
October 1	Cal Poly	Aztec Bowl; San Diego, CA	L 6–12	8,000	
October 8	at Pomona-Claremont*	Claremont Alumni Field; Claremont, CA	L 20–28		
October 15	Arizona State*	Balboa Stadium; San Diego, CA	L 0–46	14,000	
October 22	San Diego NTS (Note: Naval Training Center San Diego (Naval Training Station) was a U.S. Navy facility from 1923 to 1997.)*	Aztec Bowl; San Diego, CA	W 14–12	6,000	
October 29	San Francisco State*^{†}	Aztec Bowl; San Diego, CA	W 7–6	5,000	
November 5	at Fresno State	Ratcliffe Stadium; Fresno, CA (rivalry)	L 6–20	6,228	
November 12	at New Mexico A&M*	Memorial Stadium (Note: This stadium is the predecessor to the current Memorial Stadium on the New Mexico State campus, which was opened for the 1978 season); Las Cruces, NM	L 6–26	4,000	
November 19	San Diego Marines (Note: The Marine Corps Recruit Depot (MCRD) in San Diego fielded a team that played against colleges and other military teams from 1922–1964.)*	Aztec Bowl; San Diego, CA	L 0–32	4,000	
November 26	at Whittier*	Hadley Field; Whittier, CA	L 6–28	4,000	
*Non-conference game; ^{†}Homecoming

== Team players in the NFL ==
No San Diego State players were selected in the 1956 NFL draft.
