= 1955 Chico State Wildcats football team =

American college football season

1955 Chico State Wildcats football
- Conference: Far Western Conference
- Record: 7–2 (5–0 FWC)
- Head coach: Gus Manolis (2nd season)
- Home stadium: Chico High School Stadium

1955 Far Western Conference football standings
	Conf.					Overall
Team	W		L		T	W		L		T
Chico State	5	–	0	–	0	7	–	2	–	0
Cal Aggies	3	–	1	–	1	5	–	3	–	1
San Francisco State	3	–	2	–	0	5	–	5	–	0
Humboldt State	2	–	2	–	1	7	–	3	–	1
Nevada	1	–	4	–	0	2	–	5	–	0
Sacramento State	0	–	5	–	0	2	–	6	–	0
No conference champion was named for the 1955 season.

The 1955 Chico State Wildcats football team represented Chico State College—now known as California State University, Chico—as a member of the Far Western Conference (FWC) during the 1955 college football season. Led by second-year head coach Gus Manolis, Chico State compiled an overall record of 7–2 with a mark of 5–0 in conference play, placing first in the FWC, although no conference championship was awarded. The team outscored its opponents 194 to 108 for the season. The Wildcats played home games at Chico High School Stadium in Chico, California.

== Schedule ==
Date	Opponent	Site	Result	Source
September 24	at Presidio of San Francisco (Note: The Presidio of San Francisco was an Army fort from 1848 to 1996. For many years they fielded a team that played against colleges and other military teams.)*	San Francisco, CA	W 12–6	
October 1	at Pepperdine*	El Camino Stadium; Torrance, CA	W 19–13	
October 8	Whittier*	Chico High School Stadium; Chico, CA	L 7–28	
October 15	San Francisco State	Chico High School Stadium; Chico, CA	W 9–6	
October 22	at Lewis & Clark*	Griswold Stadium; Portland, OR	L 13–28	
October 29	at Nevada	Mackay Stadium (Note: This stadium is the predecessor to the current Mackay Stadium, which was opened for the 1966 season.); Reno, NV	W 47–0	
November 5	Sacramento State	Chico High School Stadium; Chico, CA	W 26–7	
November 11	at Cal Aggies	Aggie Field; Davis, CA	W 21–13	
November 19	Humboldt State	Chico High School Stadium; Chico, CA	W 40–7	
*Non-conference game
