= 1957 UC Santa Barbara Gauchos football team =

American college football season

1957 UC Santa Barbara Gauchos football
- Conference: California Collegiate Athletic Association
- Record: 6–2 (2–1 CCAA)
- Head coach: Ed Cody (2nd season)
- Home stadium: La Playa Stadium

1957 California Collegiate Athletic Association football standings
	Conf.					Overall
Team	W		L		T	W		L		T
Cal Poly $	3	–	0	–	0	8	–	1	–	0
UC Santa Barbara	2	–	1	–	0	6	–	2	–	0
Fresno State	1	–	1	–	0	5	–	5	–	0
Los Angeles State	1	–	1	–	0	5	–	4	–	0
San Diego State	0	–	1	–	0	2	–	7	–	0
Long Beach State	0	–	3	–	0	3	–	5	–	0
$ – Conference champion; The conference championship was unofficial because the six CCAA members did not play a full conference schedule.

The 1957 UC Santa Barbara Gauchos football team represented University of California, Santa Barbara (UCSB) as a member of the California Collegiate Athletic Association (CCAA) during the 1957 college football season. Led by second-year head coach Ed Cody, the Gauchos compiled an overall record of 6–2 with a mark of 2–1 in conference play, placing second in the CCAA. UC Santa Barbara played home games at La Playa Stadium in Santa Barbara, California.

== Schedule ==
Date	Opponent	Site	Result	Attendance	Source
September 27	Whittier*	La Playa Stadium; Santa Barbara, CA	W 13–0		
October 4	at Occidental*	D.W. Patterson Field; Los Angeles, CA	L 6–21		
October 12	Los Angeles State	La Playa Stadium; Santa Barbara, CA	W 39–0		
October 18	Long Beach State	La Playa Stadium; Santa Barbara, CA	W 28–7		
November 2	vs. Cal Aggies (Note: The game against the Cal Aggies was part of an "All-UC Doubleheader" that was held annually from 1948 to 1963. The other game of the double-header was California vs. UCLA. The games were always held at the home stadium of either Cal or UCLA.)*	Los Angeles Memorial Coliseum; Los Angeles, CA	W 39–0		
November 9	Pepperdine*	La Playa Stadium; Santa Barbara, CA	W 32–14	8,500	
November 16	at Redlands*	Redlands Stadium (Note: This stadium is the predecessor to the current Ted Runner Stadium on the University of Redlands campus, which was opened for the 1968 season); Redlands, CA	W 20–0		
November 28 (Note: Postponed from October 27)	at Cal Poly	Mustang Stadium; San Luis Obispo, CA	L 20–40	5,000	
*Non-conference game

== Team players in the NFL ==
The following UC Santa Barbara Gaucho players were selected in the 1958 NFL draft.

Player	Position	Round	Overall	NFL team
Johnny Morris	Flanker, halfback	12	137	Chicago Bears
