= Bill Schutte =

American football player and coach (1910–1994)

Biographical details
- Born: May 7, 1910; Galveston, Texas, U.S.
- Died: May 24, 1994 (aged 84); Orange County, California, U.S.

Playing career
- 1930–1933: Idaho

Coaching career (HC unless noted)
- 1939–1941: Kansas State (line)
- 1946: Kansas State (assistant)
- 1947–1955: San Diego State

Head coaching record
- Overall: 48–36–4
- Bowls: 1–1

Accomplishments and honors

Championships
- 2 CCAA (1951–1952)

William Henry Schutte (May 7, 1910 – May 24, 1994) was an American football player and coach. He served as the head football coach at San Diego State University from 1947 to 1955, compiling a record of 48–36–4. Prior to being hired at San Diego State, Schutte was an assistant coach at Kansas State University.

== Head coaching record ==
=== College ===
Year	Team	Overall	Conference	Standing	Bowl/playoffs
San Diego State (California Collegiate Athletic Association) (1947–1955)
1947	San Diego State	7–3–1	2–2–1	4th	L Harbor
1948	San Diego State	4–7	1–4	T–5th	
1949	San Diego State	6–3	3–1	2nd	
1950	San Diego State	5–3–1	3–0–1	1st	
1951	San Diego State	10–0–1	4–0	1st	W Pineapple
1952	San Diego State	4–5	2–2	3rd	
1953	San Diego State	5–3–1	3–1–1	2nd	
1954	San Diego State	5–4	2–2	3rd	
1955	San Diego State	2–8	0–2	3rd	
San Diego State:		48–36–4	20–14–3		
Total:		48–36–4			
National championship Conference title Conference division title or championship game berth
