= 1957 Los Angeles State Diablos football team =

American college football season

1957 Los Angeles State Diablos football
- Conference: California Collegiate Athletic Association
- Record: 5–4 (1–1 CCAA)
- Head coach: Leonard Adams (7th season)
- Home stadium: Snyder Stadium; East Los Angeles College Stadium; Reseda High School; Rose Bowl

1957 California Collegiate Athletic Association football standings
	Conf.					Overall
Team	W		L		T	W		L		T
Cal Poly $	3	–	0	–	0	8	–	1	–	0
UC Santa Barbara	2	–	1	–	0	6	–	2	–	0
Fresno State	1	–	1	–	0	5	–	5	–	0
Los Angeles State	1	–	1	–	0	5	–	4	–	0
San Diego State	0	–	1	–	0	2	–	7	–	0
Long Beach State	0	–	3	–	0	3	–	5	–	0
$ – Conference champion; The conference championship was unofficial because the six CCAA members did not play a full conference schedule.

The 1957 Los Angeles State Diablos football team represented Los Angeles State College—now known as California State University, Los Angeles—as a member of the California Collegiate Athletic Association (CCAA) during the 1957 college football season. Led by seventh-year head coach Leonard Adams, Los Angeles State compiled an overall record of 5–4 with a mark of 1–1 in conference play, tying for third place in the CCAA. The Diablos played four home games at four separate sites: Snyder Stadium in Los Angeles, East Los Angeles College Stadium in Monterey Park, California, Reseda High School in Reseda, Los Angeles, and the Rose Bowl in Pasadena, California.

== Schedule ==
Date	Time	Opponent	Site	Result	Attendance	Source
September 14		Mexico Poly*	East Los Angeles College Stadium; Monterey Park, CA	W 39–13		
September 21	8:00 p.m.	at Sacramento State*	Grant Stadium; Sacramento, CA	L 14–19	8,000	
September 27		La Verne*	Reseda High School; Reseda, CA	W 20–6		
October 4		Pepperdine*	Snyder Field; Los Angeles, CA ("Old Shoe" rivalry)	L 18–19		
October 12		at UC Santa Barbara	La Playa Stadium; Santa Barbara, CA	L 0–39		
October 19		at Eastern New Mexico*	?; Portales, NM	L 0–27		
October 25		Chico State*	Rose Bowl; Pasadena, CA	W 14–13		
November 1		at University of Mexico*	Estadio Olímpico Universitario; Mexico City, Mexico	W 28–24		
November 8		at Long Beach State*	Veterans Stadium; Long Beach, CA	W 23–14		
*Non-conference game

== Team players in the NFL ==
The following Los Angeles State players were selected in the 1958 NFL draft.

Player	Position	Round	Overall	NFL team
Ralph Anderson	End, fullback	9	101	Chicago Bears
