= 1960 Hawaii Rainbows football team =

American college football season

1960 Hawaii Rainbows football
- Conference: Independent
- Record: 3–7
- Head coach: Hank Vasconcellos (9th season)
- Home stadium: Honolulu Stadium

1960 Western non-major college football independents records
| | Conf. | | | Overall |
| Team | W | L | T | W | | L | | T |
|---|---|---|---|---|---|---|---|---|
| UC Riverside | | – | | 7 | – | 0 | – | 1 |
| Cal Poly Pomona | | – | | 7 | – | 2 | – | 0 |
| Montana State | | – | | 5 | – | 3 | – | 1 |
| Santa Clara | | – | | 4 | – | 3 | – | 0 |
| Hawaii | | – | | 3 | – | 7 | – | 0 |
| Pepperdine | | – | | 1 | – | 9 | – | 0 |

The 1960 Hawaii Rainbows football team represented the University of Hawaiʻi at Mānoa as an independent during the 1960 college football season. In their ninth season under head coach Hank Vasconcellos, the Rainbows compiled a 3–7 record. The university did not play varsity football for in 1961 season, but returned for the 1962 season.

== Schedule ==
| Date | Opponent | Site | Result | Attendance | Source |
|---|---|---|---|---|---|
| August 26 | Honolulu All-Stars | Honolulu Stadium; Honolulu, HI | W 7–0 | 21,127 | |
| September 10 | at Los Angeles State | East L.A. College Stadium; Monterey Park, CA | W 20–7 | 7,800 | |
| September 17 | at Utah | Ute Stadium; Salt Lake City, UT | L 6–33 | 16,160 | |
| September 24 | at Fresno State | Ratcliffe Stadium; Fresno, CA (rivalry) | L 7–17 | 20,000 | |
| October 1 | at Pacific (CA) | Pacific Memorial Stadium; Stockton, CA | L 20–28 | 8,000 | |
| October 23 | Idaho | Honolulu Stadium; Honolulu, HI | L 6–14 | 12,000 | |
| October 28 | Humboldt State | Honolulu Stadium; Honolulu, HI | L 15–29 | 8,000–9,000 | |
| November 11 | Lewis & Clark^{†} | Honolulu Stadium; Honolulu, HI | L 13–18 | 7,000 | |
| November 25 | BYU | Honolulu Stadium; Honolulu, HI | W 13–6 | 10,000 | |
| December 2 | San Jose State | Honolulu Stadium; Honolulu, HI (rivalry) | L 6–48 | 20,000–21,000 | |
^{†}Homecoming
