= 1960 UC Riverside Highlanders football team =

American college football season

1960 UC Riverside Highlanders football
- Conference: Independent
- Record: 7–0–1
- Head coach: Jim Whitley (2nd season)
- Home stadium: UCR Athletic Field

1960 Western non-major college football independents records
	Conf.			Overall
Team	W	L	T	W		L		T
UC Riverside		–		7	–	0	–	1
Cal Poly Pomona		–		7	–	2	–	0
Montana State		–		5	–	3	–	1
Santa Clara		–		4	–	3	–	0
Hawaii		–		3	–	7	–	0
Pepperdine		–		1	–	9	–	0

The 1960 UC Riverside Highlanders football team represented the University of California, Riverside as an independent during the 1960 college football season. Led by second-year head coach Jim Whitley, UC Riverside compiled a record of 7–0–1. The team outscored its opponents 144 to 75 for the season. The Highlanders played home games at UCR Athletic Field in Riverside, California.

== Schedule ==
Date	Time	Opponent	Site	Result	Source
September 24		Chino Institute for Men	Chino, CA	W 20–14	
October 1		Caltech	UCR Athletic Field; Riverside, CA	W 28–18	
October 8		UC Davis	UCR Athletic Field; Riverside, CA	W 12–6	
October 15		Naval Ordnance	UCR Athletic Field; Riverside, CA	W 42–13	
October 22		Claremont-Mudd	UCR Athletic Field; Riverside, CA	W 12–7	
October 29		at Pomona	Claremont Alumni Field; Claremont, CA	W 6–0	
November 5		at Azusa (Note: Azusa College existed from 1956 to 1964. It merged with Los Angeles Pacific College in 1965 to become Azusa Pacific University. Azusa Pacific's official football records do not include the history from either of the predecessor schools.)	Covina High School; Covina, CA	T 8–8	
November 12	2:00 p.m.	at Cal Western	Point Loma High School field; San Diego, CA	W 16–9	
All times are in Pacific time
