= 1960 San Diego State Aztecs football team =

American college football season

1960 San Diego State Aztecs football
- Conference: California Collegiate Athletic Association
- Record: 1–6–1 (0–5 CCAA)
- Head coach: Paul Governali (5th season)
- Home stadium: Aztec Bowl

1960 California Collegiate Athletic Association football standings
	Conf.					Overall
Team	W		L		T	W		L		T
No. 9 Fresno State $	5	–	0	–	0	9	–	1	–	0
Long Beach State	3	–	1	–	1	5	–	3	–	1
Los Angeles State	3	–	1	–	1	4	–	3	–	1
UC Santa Barbara	2	–	3	–	0	2	–	5	–	1
Cal Poly	1	–	4	–	0	1	–	5	–	0
San Diego State	0	–	5	–	0	1	–	6	–	1
$ – Conference champion; Cal Poly forfeited cancelled conference games to Los Angeles State and UC Santa Barbara, but this forfeit did not affect overall records of the teams.; Rankings from UPI small college poll

The 1960 San Diego State Aztecs football team represented San Diego State College (Note: San Diego State University was known as San Diego State College from 1935 to 1971.) during the 1960 college football season.

San Diego State competed in the California Collegiate Athletic Association (CCAA). The team was led by head coach Paul Governali, in his fifth (and last) year, and played home games at Aztec Bowl. They finished the season with one win, six losses and one tie (1–6–1, 0–5–0 CCAA). The Aztecs were shutout four times and scored only 53 points in their eight games, while giving up 207.

== Schedule ==
Date	Opponent	Site	Result	Attendance	Source
September 24	Los Angeles State	Aztec Bowl; San Diego, CA	L 14–24	9,500	
October 1	at Cal Poly	Mustang Stadium; San Luis Obispo, CA	L 6–34	5,000	
October 8	at Long Beach State	Veterans Stadium; Long Beach, CA	L 0–28	5,000	
October 15	Redlands*	Aztec Bowl; San Diego, CA	T 0–0	8,500	
October 22	at UC Santa Barbara	La Playa Stadium; Santa Barbara, CA	L 6–8	7,000	
October 29	Fresno State	Aztec Bowl; San Diego, CA (rivalry)	L 0–60	6,500	
November 5	Pepperdine*	Aztec Bowl; San Diego	W 27–20	1,800	
November 12	San Diego Marines (Note: The Marine Corps Recruit Depot (MCRD) in San Diego fielded a team that played against colleges and other military teams from 1922 to 1964.)*	Aztec Bowl; San Diego	L 0–33	6,500	
*Non-conference game
