= Gus Manolis =

American football coach (1922–1958)

Biographical details
- Born: February 9, 1923; Sacramento, California, U.S.
- Died: January 28, 1958 (aged 34) near Alder Springs, California, U.S.

Coaching career (HC unless noted)
- 1947–1949: California (assistant)
- 1950–1953: Yuba
- 1954–1957: Chico State

Head coaching record
- Overall: 23–12–1 (college); 30–8–1 (junior college)
- Bowls: 1–0–1 (junior college)

Accomplishments and honors

Championships
- 2 GVC (1951, 1953)

Gus Manolis (February 9, 1923 – January 28, 1958) was an American college football coach. He served as the head football coach at Chico State College—now known as California State University, Chico—from 1954 to 1957, compiling a record of 23–12–1. Manolis came to Chico State after a four-year stint, from 1950 to 1953, as the head football coach at Yuba College in Marysville, California.

Manolis, who was of Greek descent, was born on February 9, 1922, in Sacramento, California. He grew up in Sacramento and graduated from C. K. McClatchy High School before moving on to Sacramento Junior College—now known as Sacramento City College—for one year. During World War II, Manolis served in the United States Army Air Forces and spent two and a half years in the European theatre. After his discharge from the military in 1946, he enrolled at the University of California, Berkeley, from which he graduated with a Bachelor of Arts in 1949. As a student, he was an assistant coach for the California Golden Bears football team under head coach Pappy Waldorf. He also earned a general secondary credential in 1950 and a master's degree in 1950, both from Berkeley.

Manolis died on January 28, 1958, near Alder Springs, California, after suffering an apparent heart attack while helping with the search for a missing boy in Grindstone Canyon in the Mendocino National Forest.

== Head coaching record ==
=== College ===
Year	Team	Overall	Conference	Standing	Bowl/playoffs
Chico State Wildcats (Far Western Conference) (1954–1957)
1954	Chico State	7–2	4–1	2nd	
1955	Chico State	7–2	5–0	1st	
1956	Chico State	2–6–1	1–3–1	4th	
1957	Chico State	7–2	4–1	2nd	
Chico State:		23–12–1	14–5–1		
Total:		23–12–1			

=== Junior college ===
Year	Team	Overall	Conference	Standing	Bowl/playoffs
Yuba 49ers (Northern California Junior College Conference) (1950)
1950	Yuba	6–3	4–3	4th (Northern)	
Yuba 49ers (Golden Valley Conference) (1951–1953)
1951	Yuba	8–1–1	5–0	1st	T Gold Dust Bowl
1952	Yuba	6–3	4–1	2nd	
1953	Yuba	10–1	4–1	T–1st	W Orange Show Bowl
Yuba:		30–8–1	17–5		
Total:		30–8–1			
National championship Conference title Conference division title or championship game berth
