= 1957 Long Beach State 49ers football team =

American college football season

1957 Long Beach State 49ers football
- Conference: California Collegiate Athletic Association
- Record: 3–5 (0–3 CCAA)
- Head coach: Mike DeLotto (3rd season)
- Home stadium: Veterans Memorial Stadium

1957 California Collegiate Athletic Association football standings
	Conf.					Overall
Team	W		L		T	W		L		T
Cal Poly $	3	–	0	–	0	8	–	1	–	0
UC Santa Barbara	2	–	1	–	0	6	–	2	–	0
Fresno State	1	–	1	–	0	5	–	5	–	0
Los Angeles State	1	–	1	–	0	5	–	4	–	0
San Diego State	0	–	1	–	0	2	–	7	–	0
Long Beach State	0	–	3	–	0	3	–	5	–	0
$ – Conference champion; The conference championship was unofficial because the six CCAA members did not play a full conference schedule.

The 1957 Long Beach State 49ers football team represented Long Beach State College—now known as California State University, Long Beach—as a member of the California Collegiate Athletic Association (CCAA) during the 1957 college football season. Led by Mike DeLotto in his third and final season as head coach, the 49ers compiled an overall record of 3–5 with a mark of 0–3 in conference play, placing last out of six teams in the CCAA. The team played home games at Veterans Memorial Stadium adjacent to the campus of Long Beach City College in Long Beach, California.

== Schedule ==
Date	Opponent	Site	Result
September 27	Sacramento State*	Veterans Memorial Stadium; Long Beach, CA	L 12–19
October 4	at Cal Aggies*	Aggie Field; Davis, CA	W 12–6
October 12	at Arizona State–Flagstaff*	Skidmore Stadium; Flagstaff, AZ	W 7–6
October 18	at Santa Barbara	La Playa Stadium; Santa Barbara, CA	L 7–28
October 26	at Pepperdine*	El Camino College; Torrance, CA	W 21–0
November 1	San Francisco State*	Veterans Memorial Stadium; Long Beach, CA	L 23–38
November 8	Los Angeles State^{†}	Veterans Memorial Stadium; Long Beach, CA	L 14–23
November 15	Cal Poly	Veterans Memorial Stadium; Long Beach, CA	L 7–41
*Non-conference game; ^{†}Homecoming
