= 1960 Cal Poly Pomona Broncos football team =

American college football season

1960 Cal Poly Pomona Broncos football
- Conference: Independent
- Record: 7–2
- Head coach: Don Warhurst (4th season)
- Home stadium: Kellogg Field, Mt. Sac Stadium

1960 Western non-major college football independents records
| | Conf. | | | Overall |
| Team | W | L | T | W | | L | | T |
|---|---|---|---|---|---|---|---|---|
| UC Riverside | | – | | 7 | – | 0 | – | 1 |
| Cal Poly Pomona | | – | | 7 | – | 2 | – | 0 |
| Montana State | | – | | 5 | – | 3 | – | 1 |
| Santa Clara | | – | | 4 | – | 3 | – | 0 |
| Hawaii | | – | | 3 | – | 7 | – | 0 |
| Pepperdine | | – | | 1 | – | 9 | – | 0 |

The 1960 Cal Poly Pomona Broncos football team represented the Cal Poly Kellogg-Voorhis Unit—now known as California State Polytechnic University, Pomona—as an independent during the 1960 college football season. Led by fourth-year head coach Don Warhurst, Cal Poly Pomona compiled a record of 7–2. The team outscored its opponents 201 to 134 for the season.

== Schedule ==
| Date | Time | Opponent | Site | Result | Attendance | Source |
|---|---|---|---|---|---|---|
| September 16 | | vs. San Diego Marines (Note: The Marine Corps Recruit Depot (MCRD) in San Diego fielded a team that played against colleges and other military teams from 1922 to 1964.) | Brawley, CA | L 12–27 | 1,800 | |
| October 1 | 8:00 p.m. | San Francisco State | Kellogg Field; Pomona, CA | L 0–20 | 3,500 | |
| October 8 | | at Nevada | Mackay Stadium (Note: This stadium is the predecessor to the current Mackay Stadium, which was opened for the 1966 season.); Reno, NV | W 20–6 | 2,000–3,500 | |
| October 15 | 8:00 p.m. | Whittier | Mt. Sac Stadium; Walnut, CA (White Cane Bowl) | W 33–14 | 3,000–6,000 | |
| October 22 | | at Pepperdine | Sentinel Field; Inglewood, CA | W 44–14 | 2,000 | |
| October 29 | | at Sacramento State | Charles C. Hughes Stadium; Sacramento, CA | W 19–18 | 1,500 | |
| November 5 | | Arizona State–Flagstaff | Kellogg Field; Pomona, CA | W 18–14 | 1,500–2,000 | |
| November 19 | 8:00 p.m. | at San Diego | Westgate Park; San Diego, CA | W 28–14 | 3,000 | |
| November 23 | | Redlands | Kellogg Field; Pomona, CA | W 27–7 | 1,600–2,500 | |
All times are in Pacific time
