= 1960 Fresno State Bulldogs football team =

American college football season

1960 Fresno State Bulldogs football

CCAA champion
- Conference: California Collegiate Athletic Association

Ranking
- Coaches: No. 9 (UPI small college)
- Record: 9–1 (5–0 CCAA)
- Head coach: Cecil Coleman (2nd season)
- Home stadium: Ratcliffe Stadium

1960 California Collegiate Athletic Association football standings
	Conf.					Overall
Team	W		L		T	W		L		T
No. 9 Fresno State $	5	–	0	–	0	9	–	1	–	0
Long Beach State	3	–	1	–	1	5	–	3	–	1
Los Angeles State	3	–	1	–	1	4	–	3	–	1
UC Santa Barbara	2	–	3	–	0	2	–	5	–	1
Cal Poly	1	–	4	–	0	1	–	5	–	0
San Diego State	0	–	5	–	0	1	–	6	–	1
$ – Conference champion; Cal Poly forfeited cancelled conference games to Los Angeles State and UC Santa Barbara, but this forfeit did not affect overall records of the teams.; Rankings from UPI small college poll

The 1960 Fresno State Bulldogs football team represented Fresno State College—now known as California State University, Fresno—as a member of the California Collegiate Athletic Association (CCAA) during the 1960 college football season. Led by second-year head coach Cecil Coleman, Fresno State compiled an overall record of 9–1 with a mark of 5–0 in conference play, winning the CCAA title for the third consecutive year. The Bulldogs played home games at Ratcliffe Stadium on the campus of Fresno City College in Fresno, California.

== Schedule ==
Date	Opponent	Rank	Site	Result	Attendance	Source
September 24	Hawaii*		Ratcliffe Stadium; Fresno, CA (rivalry)	W 17–7	9,601	
September 30	at UC Santa Barbara		La Playa Stadium; Santa Barbara, CA	W 33–15	5,000	
October 8	Abilene Christian*		Ratcliffe Stadium; Fresno, CA	W 20–19	8,479	
October 15	Cal Poly		Ratcliffe Stadium; Fresno, CA	W 33–0	7,500–11,320	
October 22	at Los Angeles State		Rose Bowl; Pasadena, CA	W 35–13		
October 29	San Diego State		Ratcliffe Stadium; Fresno, CA (rivalry)	W 60–0	6,500	
November 5	Long Beach State	No. 8	Ratcliffe Stadium; Fresno, CA	W 21–3	5,194	
November 11	at San Jose State*	No. 8	Spartan Stadium; San Jose, CA (rivalry)	W 27–12	9,000	
November 19	Montana State*	No. 6	Ratcliffe Stadium; Fresno, CA	L 20–22	12,440	
November 26	Pacific (CA)*		Ratcliffe Stadium; Fresno, CA	W 32–7	10,011–10,500	
*Non-conference game; Rankings from AP Poll released prior to the game

== Team players in the NFL/AFL ==
The following were selected in the 1961 NFL draft.

Player	Position	Round	Overall	NFL team
Dale Messer	Halfback	4	52	San Francisco 49ers

The following were selected in the 1961 AFL draft.

Player	Position	Round	Overall	AFL team
Dale Messer	Halfback	13	103	San Diego Chargers

The following finished their college career in 1960, were not drafted, but played in the AFL (prior to the merge with the NFL).

Player	Position	First AFL team
John Mattox	Tackle – Defensive tackle	1961 Denver Broncos
Nick Papac	Quarterback	1961 Oakland Raiders
