= Bill Hammer =

American football player and coach (1919–2003)

Biographical details
- Born: July 15, 1919; Somers, Montana, U.S.
- Died: December 14, 2003 (aged 84); Oak Harbor, Washington, U.S.

Playing career
- 1946–1948: Springfield
- Position: Guard

Coaching career (HC unless noted)
- 1949–1951: Springfield (assistant)
- 1953–1954: Oregon (freshmen)
- 1955–1957: Oregon (line)
- 1958–1959: Iowa State Teachers
- 1960–1962: UC Santa Barbara

Head coaching record
- Overall: 16–29–1

Willard "Bill" Hammer (July 15, 1919 – December 14, 2003) was an American college football player and coach. He served as the head football coach at Iowa State Teachers College—now known as the University of Northern Iowa–in Cedar Falls, Iowa from 1958 to 1959 and at the University of California at Santa Barbara from 1960 to 1962, compiling a career head coaching record of 16–29–1.

== Head coaching record ==
Year	Team	Overall	Conference	Standing	Bowl/playoffs
Iowa State Teachers Panthers (North Central Conference) (1958–1959)
1958	Iowa State Teachers	4–5	1–5	7th	
1959	Iowa State Teachers	6–3	3–3	T–4th	
Northern Iowa:		10–8	4–8		
UC Santa Barbara Gauchos (California Collegiate Athletic Association) (1960–1962)
1960	UC Santa Barbara	2–5–1	2–3	4th	
1961	UC Santa Barbara	2–8	0–5	6th	
1962	UC Santa Barbara	2–8	2–3	T–3rd	
UC Santa Barbara:		6–21–1	4–12		
Total:		16–29–1			
