= 1957 San Diego State Aztecs football team =

American college football season

1957 San Diego State Aztecs football
- Conference: California Collegiate Athletic Association
- Record: 2–7 (0–1 CCAA)
- Head coach: Paul Governali (2nd season)
- Home stadium: Aztec Bowl

1957 California Collegiate Athletic Association football standings
	Conf.					Overall
Team	W		L		T	W		L		T
Cal Poly $	3	–	0	–	0	8	–	1	–	0
UC Santa Barbara	2	–	1	–	0	6	–	2	–	0
Fresno State	1	–	1	–	0	5	–	5	–	0
Los Angeles State	1	–	1	–	0	5	–	4	–	0
San Diego State	0	–	1	–	0	2	–	7	–	0
Long Beach State	0	–	3	–	0	3	–	5	–	0
$ – Conference champion; The conference championship was unofficial because the six CCAA members did not play a full conference schedule.

The 1957 San Diego State Aztecs football team represented San Diego State College (Note: San Diego State University was known as San Diego State College from 1935–1971. See: San Diego State) during the 1957 college football season.

San Diego State competed in the California Collegiate Athletic Association (CCAA). The team was led by head coach Paul Governali, in his second year, and played home games at Aztec Bowl. They finished the season with two wins and seven losses (2–7, 0–1 CCAA). The Aztecs were shutout in four consecutive games and scored only 77 points in their nine games while giving up 243.

== Schedule ==
Date	Opponent	Site	Result	Attendance	Source
September 21	Pacific (CA)*	Aztec Bowl; San Diego, CA	L 6–32	9,500	
September 28	San Francisco State*	Aztec Bowl; San Diego, CA	W 14–13	8,500	
October 5	at La Verne*	Arnett Field; La Verne, CA	W 38–0	1,200	
October 12	San Diego Marines (Note: The Marine Corps Recruit Depot (MCRD) in San Diego fielded a team that played against colleges and other military teams from 1922–1964.)*	Aztec Bowl; San Diego, CA	L 7–20	11,500	
October 19	at San Jose State*	Spartan Stadium; San Jose, CA	L 0–46	8,000	
October 26	Arizona State*	Aztec Bowl; San Diego	L 0–66	8,500	
November 2	at Fresno State	Ratcliffe Stadium; Fresno, CA (rivalry)	L 0–27	5,000	
November 9	Hawaii Marines*^{†}	Aztec Bowl; San Diego, CA	L 0–25	6,800	
November 15	at Pepperdine*	El Camino Stadium; Torrance, CA	L 12–14		
*Non-conference game; ^{†}Homecoming
