= 1957 Sacramento State Hornets football team =

American college football season

1957 Sacramento State Hornets football
- Conference: Far Western Conference
- Record: 5–4 (2–3 FWC)
- Head coach: John W. Baker (1st season)
- Home stadium: Grant Stadium

1957 Far Western Conference football standings
	Conf.					Overall
Team	W		L		T	W		L		T
San Francisco State $	5	–	0	–	0	7	–	3	–	0
Chico State	4	–	1	–	0	7	–	2	–	0
Humboldt State	3	–	2	–	0	4	–	6	–	0
Sacramento State	2	–	3	–	0	5	–	4	–	0
Nevada	1	–	4	–	0	1	–	8	–	0
Cal Aggies	0	–	5	–	0	1	–	7	–	1
$ – Conference champion

The 1957 Sacramento State Hornets football team represented Sacramento State College—now known as California State University, Sacramento—as a member of the Far Western Conference (FWC) during the 1957 college football season. Led by first-year head coach John W. Baker, Sacramento State compiled an overall record of 5–4 with a mark of 2–3 in conference play, placing fourth in the FWC. The team finished with the first winning record in its four years of existence. For the season Sacramento State was outscored by its opponents 174 to 173. The Hornets played home games at Grant Stadium in Sacramento, California.

== Schedule ==
Date	Time	Opponent	Site	Result	Attendance	Source
September 21	8:00 p.m.	Los Angeles State*	Grant Stadium; Sacramento, CA	W 19–14	8,000	
September 27		at Long Beach State*	Veterans Stadium; Long Beach, CA	W 19–12		
October 5	8:00 p.m.	Moffett Field (CA) (Note: Naval Air Station Moffett Field was a Naval Air Station from 1933 to 1994.)*	Grant Stadium; Sacramento, CA	W 44–25		
October 12		at Humboldt State	Redwood Bowl; Arcata, CA	L 19–27		
October 19		at Chico State	College Field; Chico, CA	L 13–20		
November 2	2:30 p.m.	Nevada^{†}	Grant Stadium; Sacramento, CA	W 7–0		
November 9		San Francisco State	Grant Stadium; Sacramento, CA	L 6–41		
November 15		at Cal Aggies	Aggie Field; Davis, CA (rivalry)	W 26–0		
November 23		at Whittier*	Hadley Field; Whittier, CA	L 20–35		
*Non-conference game; ^{†}Homecoming
