= 1960 Pepperdine Waves football team =

American college football season

1960 Pepperdine Waves football
- Conference: Independent
- Record: 1–9
- Head coach: Pence Dacus (1st season)
- Home stadium: Sentinel Field

1960 Western non-major college football independents records
	Conf.			Overall
Team	W	L	T	W		L		T
UC Riverside		–		7	–	0	–	1
Cal Poly Pomona		–		7	–	2	–	0
Montana State		–		5	–	3	–	1
Santa Clara		–		4	–	3	–	0
Hawaii		–		3	–	7	–	0
Pepperdine		–		1	–	9	–	0

The 1960 Pepperdine Waves football team represented George Pepperdine College (Note: Pepperdine University was known as George Pepperdine College from 1937 to 1970.) as an independent during the 1960 college football season. The team was led by first-year head coach Pence Dacus. The Waves played home games at Sentinel Field on the campus of Inglewood High School in Inglewood, California. Pepperdine finished the season with a record of 1–9.

== Schedule ==
Date	Opponent	Site	Result	Attendance	Source
September 17	at Chico State	College Field; Chico, CA	L 6–22		
September 24	at Nevada	Mackay Stadium (Note: This stadium is the predecessor to the current Mackay Stadium, which was opened for the 1966 season.); Reno, NV	L 8–25		
October 1	Los Angeles State	Sentinel Field; Inglewood, CA ("Old Shoe" rivalry)	L 6–27		
October 8	at Whittier	Hadley Field; Whittier, CA	L 0–28		
October 15	at Santa Clara	Mission Field; Santa Clara, CA	L 28–35		
October 22	Cal Poly Pomona	Sentinel Field; Inglewood, CA	L 14–44	2,000	
October 29	Cal Western (Note: Alliant International University was formed in 2001 via the merger of United States International University (USIU) and California School of Professional Psychology. USIU had been known as California Western University (Cal Western) from 1952 to 1967.)	Sentinel Field; Inglewood, CA	W 10–8		
November 5	at San Diego State	Aztec Bowl; San Diego, CA	L 20–27	1,800	
November 12	San Diego	Sentinel Field; Inglewood, CA	L 13–20		
November 19	at Long Beach State	Veterans Memorial Stadium; Long Beach, CA	L 8–15	4,135	
