= 1955 Sacramento State Hornets football team =

American college football season

1955 Sacramento State Hornets football
- Conference: Far Western Conference
- Record: 2–6 (0–5 FWC)
- Head coach: Dave Strong (2nd season)
- Home stadium: Grant Stadium

1955 Far Western Conference football standings
	Conf.					Overall
Team	W		L		T	W		L		T
Chico State	5	–	0	–	0	7	–	2	–	0
Cal Aggies	3	–	1	–	1	5	–	3	–	1
San Francisco State	3	–	2	–	0	5	–	5	–	0
Humboldt State	2	–	2	–	1	7	–	3	–	1
Nevada	1	–	4	–	0	2	–	5	–	0
Sacramento State	0	–	5	–	0	2	–	6	–	0
No conference champion was named for the 1955 season.

The 1955 Sacramento State Hornets football team represented Sacramento State College—now known as California State University, Sacramento—as a member of the Far Western Conference (FWC) during the 1955 college football season. Led by second-year head coach Dave Strong, Sacramento State compiled an overall record of 2–6 with a mark of 0–5 in conference play, placing last out of six tams in the FWC. After going winless in their first season, in 1954, the Hornets won their first game ever in the 1955 opener against Southern Oregon. For the season the team was outscored by its opponents 176 to 70. The Hornets played home games at Grant Stadium in Sacramento, California.

== Schedule ==
Date	Time	Opponent	Site	Result	Attendance	Source
September 24		at Southern Oregon*	Fuller Field; Ashland, OR	W 7–6		
October 1	8:00 p.m.	Naval Station Treasure Island	Grant Stadium; Sacramento, CA	W 22–0		
October 8		Nevada	Grant Stadium; Sacramento, CA	L 7–28		
October 15		at Cal Aggies	Aggie Field; Davis, CA (rivalry)	L 0–29		
October 22		Santa Barbara*^{†}	Grant Stadium; Sacramento, CA	L 7–15	2,000	
October 29		at Humboldt State	Redwood Bowl; Arcata, CA	L 6–39	3,000	
November 5		at Chico State	Chico High School Stadium; Chico, CA	L 7–26		
November 12		San Francisco State	Grant Stadium; Sacramento, CA	L 14–33		
*Non-conference game; ^{†}Homecoming
