= 1960 Montana State Bobcats football team =

American college football season

1960 Montana State Bobcats football
- Conference: Independent
- Record: 5–3–1
- Head coach: Herb Agocs (3rd season)
- Home stadium: Gatton Field

1960 Western non-major college football independents records
	Conf.			Overall
Team	W	L	T	W		L		T
UC Riverside		–		7	–	0	–	1
Cal Poly Pomona		–		7	–	2	–	0
Montana State		–		5	–	3	–	1
Santa Clara		–		4	–	3	–	0
Hawaii		–		3	–	7	–	0
Pepperdine		–		1	–	9	–	0

The 1960 Montana State Bobcats football team was an American football team that represented Montana State College (now known as Montana State University) as an independent during the 1960 college football season. In its third season under head coach Herb Agocs, the team compiled a 5–3–1 record.

== Schedule ==
Date	Opponent	Site	Result	Attendance	Source
September 17	at North Dakota	Memorial Stadium; Grand Forks, ND	T 6–6	5,621	
September 24	at South Dakota State	State Field; Brookings, SD	L 14–20	5,000	
October 1	Wichita	Gatton Field; Bozeman, MT	L 3–14	6,000	
October 8	at Cal Poly	Mustang Stadium; San Luis Obispo, CA	W 22–18	6,000	
October 15	Idaho State^{†}	Gatton Field; Bozeman, MT	W 14–9	8,000	
October 22	Arkansas State	Gatton Field; Bozeman, MT	W 26–7	5,000–8,000	
October 29	North Dakota State	Gatton Field; Bozeman, MT	W 26–14	2,000	
November 5	at Montana	Dornblaser Field; Missoula, MT (rivalry)	L 6–10	8,000	
November 19	at Fresno State	Ratcliffe Stadium; Fresno, CA	W 22–20	12,440	
^{†}Homecoming
