= 1960 UC Davis Aggies football team =

American college football season

1960 UC Davis Aggies football
- Conference: Far Western Conference
- Record: 0–8–1 (0–5 FWC)
- Head coach: Will Lotter (5th season)
- Captain: Carl Ehret
- Home stadium: Aggie Field

1960 Far Western Conference football standings
	Conf.					Overall
Team	W		L		T	W		L		T
No. 2/3 Humboldt State $	5	–	0	–	0	11	–	1	–	0
San Francisco State	4	–	1	–	0	9	–	1	–	0
Chico State	2	–	3	–	0	6	–	4	–	0
Sacramento State	2	–	3	–	0	5	–	5	–	0
Nevada	2	–	3	–	0	3	–	6	–	0
UC Davis	0	–	5	–	0	0	–	8	–	1
$ – Conference champion; Rankings from NAIA poll and AP small college poll

The 1960 UC Davis Aggies football team represented the University of California, Davis as a member of the Far Western Conference (FWC) during the 1960 college football season. Led by fifth-year head coach Will Lotter, the Aggies compiled an overall record of 0–8–1 with a mark of 0–5 in conference play, placing last out of six teams in the FWC. The team was outscored by its opponents 216 to 54 for the season. The Aggies played home games at Aggie Field in Davis, California.

The UC Davis sports teams were commonly called the "Cal Aggies" from 1924 until the mid 1970s.

== Schedule ==
Date	Opponent	Site	Result	Attendance	Source
September 24	at Pacific (OR)*	Tom Reynolds Field; Forest Grove, OR	L 0–28		
October 1	Whittier*	Aggie Field; Davis, CA	L 0–14		
October 8	at UC Riverside*	UCR Athletic Field; Riverside, CA	L 6–12		
October 15	at Nevada	Mackay Stadium (Note: This stadium is the predecessor to the current Mackay Stadium, which was opened for the 1966 season.); Reno, NV	L 22–40	3,000	
October 21	Humboldt State	Aggie Field; Davis, CA	L 8–30	2,000	
October 28	San Francisco State	Aggie Field; Davis, CA	L 0–41	2,000–2,200	
November 5	vs. UC Santa Barbara (Note: The game against UC Santa Barbara was part of an "All-UC Doubleheader" that was held annually from 1948 to 1963. The other game of the double-header was California vs. UCLA. The games were always held at the home stadium of either Cal or UCLA.)*	California Memorial Stadium; Berkeley, CA	T 6–6	1,200	
November 12	at Chico State	College Field; Chico, CA	L 12–14		
November 19	at Sacramento State	Charles C. Hughes Stadium; Sacramento, CA (rivalry)	L 0–31	3,814	
*Non-conference game
