= 1960 Humboldt State Lumberjacks football team =

American college football season

1960 Humboldt State Lumberjacks football

FWC champion

NAIA semifinal, W 13–6 vs. Whitworth NAIA championship game—Holiday Bowl, L 14–15 vs. Lenoir Rhyne
- Conference: Far Western Conference

Ranking
- Coaches: No. 8 (UPI small college)
- AP: No. 3 (AP small college)
- Record: 11–1 (5–0 FWC)
- Head coach: Phil Sarboe (10th season)
- Home stadium: Albee Stadium

1960 Far Western Conference football standings
	Conf.					Overall
Team	W		L		T	W		L		T
No. 2/3 Humboldt State $	5	–	0	–	0	11	–	1	–	0
San Francisco State	4	–	1	–	0	9	–	1	–	0
Chico State	2	–	3	–	0	6	–	4	–	0
Sacramento State	2	–	3	–	0	5	–	5	–	0
Nevada	2	–	3	–	0	3	–	6	–	0
UC Davis	0	–	5	–	0	0	–	8	–	1
$ – Conference champion; Rankings from NAIA poll and AP small college poll

The 1960 Humboldt State Lumberjacks football team represented Humboldt State College during the 1960 college football season. Humboldt State competed in the Far Western Conference (FWC).

The 1960 Lumberjacks were led by tenth-year head coach Phil Sarboe. They played home games at Albee Stadium in Eureka, California. Humboldt State went undefeated during the regular season, finishing with ten wins and no losses (10–0, 5–0 FWC).

At the end of the season Humboldt State was invited to take part in the NAIA playoffs. In the semifinal game they played at home against the Whitworth Pirates and emerged victorious. In the NAIA championship game, called the Holiday Bowl from 1956 to 1960, they faced the Lenoir–Rhyne Bears in St. Petersburg, Florida. Lenoir–Rhyne prevailed by one point in the game, breaking the Lumberjacks two-season, 20-game winning streak. That brought Humboldt State's final record to eleven wins and one loss (11–1, 5–0 FWC). The Lumberjacks outscored their opponents 307 to 89 for the season. In their 11 wins, Humboldt State outscored their opponents by an average score of 27–7.

== Schedule ==
Date	Opponent	Rank	Site	Result	Attendance	Source
September 17	Linfield*		Albee Stadium; Eureka, CA	W 33–0	4,500	
September 24	at Eastern Washington*		Woodward Field; Cheney, WA	W 25–6	450–500	
October 1	San Diego*		Albee Stadium; Eureka, CA	W 20–0	4,500	
October 8	San Francisco State		Albee Stadium; Eureka, CA	W 21–18	7,000	
October 15	Sacramento State	No. 7 AP	Albee Stadium; Eureka, CA	W 33–9	5,000	
October 21	at UC Davis	No. 6 AP	Aggie Field; Davis, CA	W 30–8	3,000	
October 28	at Hawaii*	No. 8 AP	Honolulu Stadium; Honolulu, HI	W 29–15	8,000–9,000	
November 5	Chico State	No. 7 AP / 13 UPI	Albee Stadium; Eureka, CA	W 33–6	7,000–7,500	
November 12	at Nevada	No. 9 AP / 12 UPI	Mackay Stadium (Note: This stadium is the predecessor to the current Mackay Stadium, which was opened for the 1966 season."University of Nevada, Reno; Mackay Stadium".); Reno, NV	W 22–6	1,000	
November 24	Lewis & Clark*	No. 8 AP / 8 UPI	Albee Stadium; Eureka, CA	W 34–0	5,000	
December 3	No. 4 AP / 15 UPI Whitworth*	No. 3 AP / 8 UPI	Albee Stadium; Eureka, CA (NAIA semifinal)	W 13–6	10,000	
December 10	vs. No. 2 AP / 3 UPI Lenoir Rhyne*	No. 3 AP / 8 UPI	Stewart Field; St. Petersburg, FL (NAIA championship game—Holiday Bowl)	L 14–15	7,500	
*Non-conference game; Rankings from AP/UPI Poll released prior to the game

== Team players in the NFL ==
The following Humboldt State players were selected in the 1961 NFL draft.

Player	Position	Round	Overall	NFL team
Vester Flanagan	Tackle	9	124	Green Bay Packers
