= 1960 Cal Poly Mustangs football team =

American college football season

1960 Cal Poly Mustangs football
- Conference: California Collegiate Athletic Association
- Record: 1–5 (1–4 CCAA)
- Head coach: LeRoy Hughes (11th season)
- Home stadium: Mustang Stadium

1960 California Collegiate Athletic Association football standings
	Conf.					Overall
Team	W		L		T	W		L		T
No. 9 Fresno State $	5	–	0	–	0	9	–	1	–	0
Long Beach State	3	–	1	–	1	5	–	3	–	1
Los Angeles State	3	–	1	–	1	4	–	3	–	1
UC Santa Barbara	2	–	3	–	0	2	–	5	–	1
Cal Poly	1	–	4	–	0	1	–	5	–	0
San Diego State	0	–	5	–	0	1	–	6	–	1
$ – Conference champion; Cal Poly forfeited cancelled conference games to Los Angeles State and UC Santa Barbara, but this forfeit did not affect overall records of the teams.; Rankings from UPI small college poll

The 1960 Cal Poly Mustangs football team represented California Polytechnic State College as a member of the California Collegiate Athletic Association (CCAA) during the 1960 college football season. Led by 11th-year head coach LeRoy Hughes, Cal Poly compiled an overall record of 1–5 with a mark of 1–4 in conference play, placing fifth in the CCAA. Tragedy struck following the game at Bowling Green State University on October 29, when the aircraft transporting the team crashed, killing 22 people, including 16 Cal Poly Mustang football players and the team manager. Cal Poly cancelled the rest of their scheduled games, against Los Angeles State, UC Santa Barbara, and Adams State. Los Angeles State and UC Santa Barbara were awarded forfeits from the Mustangs in the CCAA standings, but these results were not reflected in the overall records for the teams. The Mustangs played home games at Mustang Stadium in San Luis Obispo, California.

The following year, on November 23, 1961, a benefit game was held to raise a memorial fund for the survivors and bereaved families. Called the Mercy Bowl, it was played at the Los Angeles Memorial Coliseum in Los Angeles. The Mercy Bowl pitted Fresno State and Bowling Green, and raised more than $200,000.

== Schedule ==
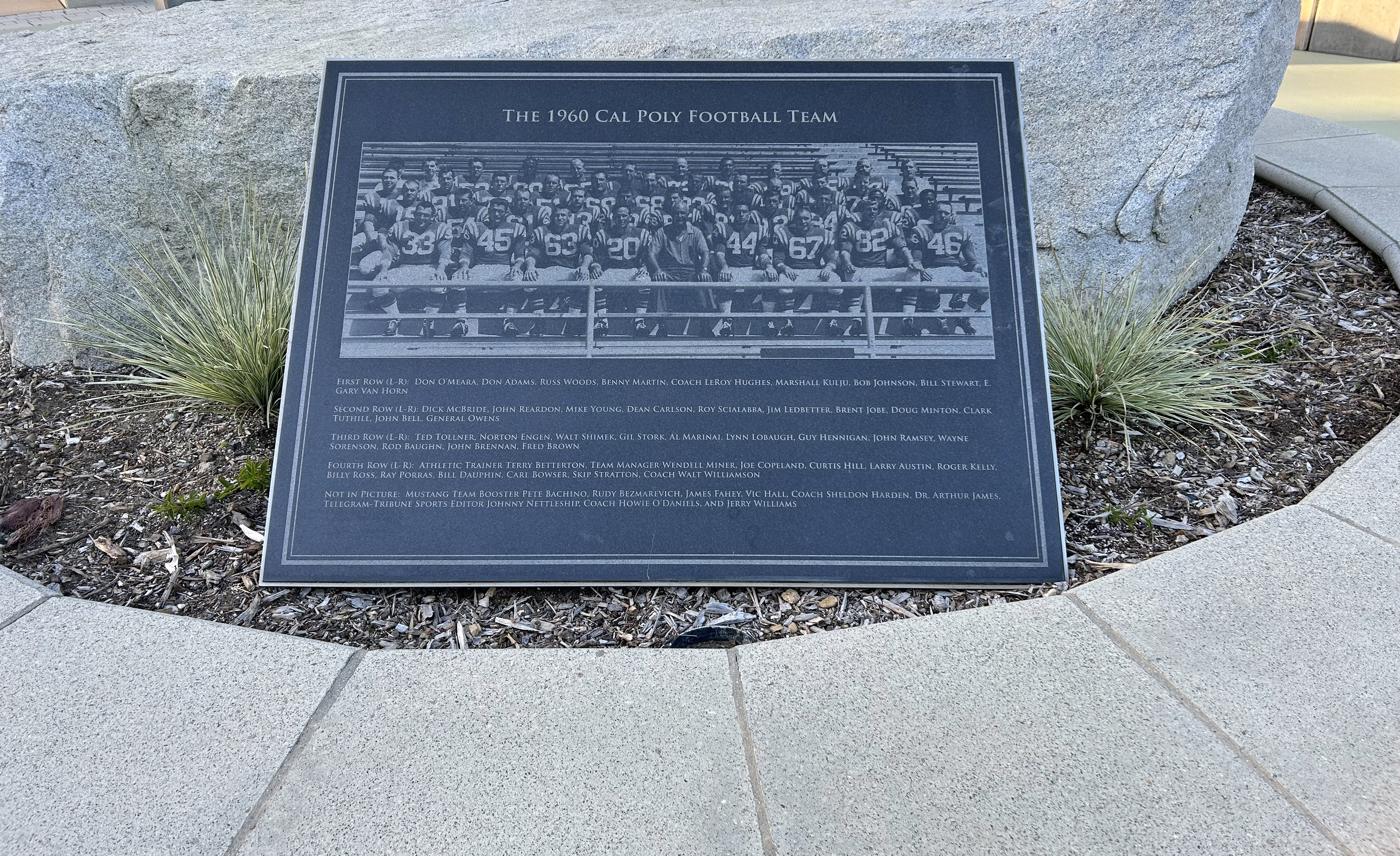
A plaque for the 1960 Cal Poly football team is shown at its display near the southwest corner of Mustang Memorial Field in San Luis Obispo, California, in April 2023.

Date	Opponent	Site	Result	Attendance	Source
September 16	at BYU*	Cougar Stadium (Note: This stadium is the predecessor to the current Cougar Stadium on the BYU campus, which was opened for the 1964 season); Provo, UT	L 14–34	4,426–6,000	
October 1	San Diego State	Mustang Stadium; San Luis Obispo, CA	W 34–6	4,500–5,000	
October 8	Montana State*	Mustang Stadium; San Luis Obispo, CA	L 18–22	6,000	
October 15	at Fresno State	Ratcliffe Stadium; Fresno, California	L 0–33	7,500–11,320	
October 22	at Long Beach State	Veterans Stadium; Long Beach, CA	L 12–36	3,000–4,950	
October 29	at No. 4 Bowling Green*	University Stadium; Bowling Green, OH	L 6–50	4,900–7,500	
*Non-conference game; Rankings from AP Poll released prior to the game

== See also ==
- California Polytechnic State University football team plane crash
