= Alder Springs, Glenn County, California =

Unincorporated community in California, United States

Alder Springs
- Unincorporated community
- Location in California Alder Springs (the United States)
- Coordinates: 39°39′04″N 122°43′32″W
- Country: United States
- State: California
- County: Glenn
- Elevation: 4,455 ft (1,358 m)

Alder Springs (formerly, Oriental) is a set of springs and an unincorporated community in Glenn County, California, United States. It is located 10.5 miles (17 km) west-northwest of Elk Creek, at an elevation of 4455 feet (1358 m).

The Oriental post office opened in 1888, changed its name to Alder Springs in 1917, and closed permanently in 1940.

Alder Springs is the location of the California Department of Corrections and Rehabilitation Valley View Conservation Camp. This fire camp of approximately 115 inmates operates under a joint agreement of the California Department of Correction and Rehabilitation and the California Department of Forestry and Fire Protection.

The Berkeley Seismology Laboratory of the University of California, Berkeley has a strong motion sensor for detecting seismic activity here, in addition to a short period sensor operated by the California Department of Water Resources. There is also a nearby National Oceanic and Atmospheric Administration weather station.
