= California Polytechnic State University football team plane crash =

1960 accident in Ohio, US

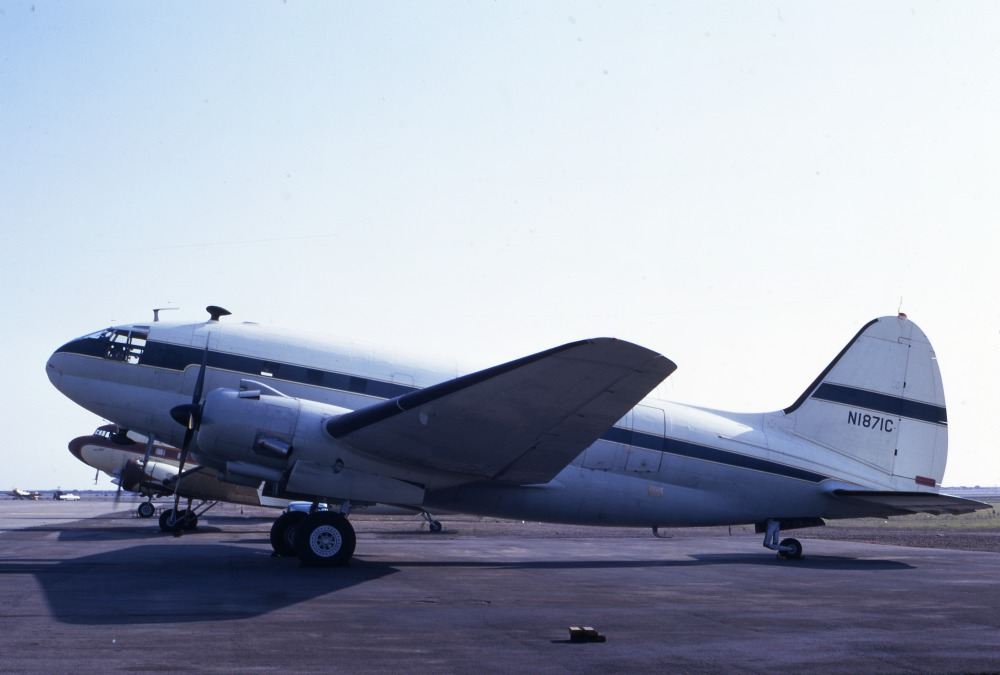
- A civilian C-46 similar to the aircraft involved in the accident

Accident
- Date: October 29, 1960
- Summary: Loss of control on take-off
- Site: Toledo Express Airport, Ohio, United States; 41°35′19″N 83°48′42″W

Aircraft
- Aircraft type: Curtiss C-46 Commando
- Operator: Arctic Pacific
- Registration: N1244N
- Occupants: 48
- Passengers: 45
- Crew: 3
- Fatalities: 22
- Injuries: 26
- Survivors: 26

On October 29, 1960, a Curtiss C-46 passenger aircraft crashed shortly after take-off near Toledo, Ohio, U.S. The World War II-era aircraft was carrying the Cal Poly Mustangs college football team home from a game against the Bowling Green Falcons. Of the 48 people on board, 22 were killed, including both pilots, 16 players, a student manager, and a Cal Poly football booster.

== Accident ==
At the time of the crash, Bowling Green State had been the easternmost opposing school to play football against Cal Poly.

The weather at the airport steadily deteriorated in the hours before takeoff. Visibility at 7 p.m. was 3/4-mile (1.2 km); 1/16-mile (100 m) at 8:37 p.m.; and zero at the time of the accident, 22:02 EST.

Meanwhile, the Curtiss C-46 Commando aircraft was loaded until it was 2,000 lb (910 kg) above its maximum certificated gross takeoff weight of 47,100 lb (21,360 kg). Upon takeoff, the left engine partially lost power.

An investigation of the accident concluded that there was a partial power loss in the left engine before the crash.

The Civil Aeronautics Board (CAB)'s final report said, "The accident was due to loss of control during a premature lift-off. Contributing factors were the overweight aircraft, weather conditions, and partial loss of power in the left engine."

== Aftermath ==
The pilot who made the decision to take off was flying on a certificate that had been revoked, but he was allowed to fly pending an appeal. After the crash, the Arctic-Pacific Company lost its certificate to charter airplanes.

Two weeks afterward, Life magazine published an article, "Campus Overwhelmed by Team's Tragic Flight".

The Federal Aviation Administration (FAA) consequently published a notice in the Airman's Guide that prohibited takeoff for commercial aircraft when the visibility is below 1/4 mile (400 m), or the runway visual range is below 2,000 ft (600 m).

The university canceled the final three games of its 1960 season. As a result of the crash, Cal Poly did not play any road games outside California until 1969, a 14–0 loss at Montana in Missoula. Cal Poly did not play another game east of the Rocky Mountains until 1978, a 17–0 loss to Winston-Salem State in North Carolina in the NCAA Division II playoffs. They did not play another regular-season game east of the Rockies until 1989, a 45–20 loss to Angelo State in Texas.

Among the survivors was quarterback Ted Tollner, who would later become the head coach at USC and San Diego State.

Hall of Fame coach John Madden, a Cal Poly alumnus who played for the Mustangs during the 1957 and 1958 seasons, had a fear of flying, which was commonly attributed to the crash, although he said it stemmed from claustrophobia. Madden was coaching at the nearby Allan Hancock Junior College at the time of the crash and knew many passengers aboard the aircraft.

In April 2001, the tragedy was examined in an ESPN Outside the Lines monthly special focusing on the evolution and frequency of travel in collegiate and pro sports. The segment, entitled "Have Game, Will Travel," included an interview with Tollner conducted by Lisa Salters.

On September 29, 2006, the 1960 football team was inducted into the Cal Poly Athletics Hall of Fame. The following night, former players and members of the crash victims' families stood at mid-field of Spanos Stadium during a halftime memorial.

=== Mercy Bowl ===
In the following season on Thanksgiving Day 1961, Los Angeles County Supervisor Warren Dorn and Bob Hope sponsored a "Mercy Bowl" in the Los Angeles Memorial Coliseum between Fresno State and Bowling Green State to raise a memorial fund for the survivors and bereaved families. The event raised about $200,000 from a crowd of 33,000 on November 23. Fresno State defeated Bowling Green in the game, 36–6.

In 2008 interviews with ESPN, several former Cal Poly players expressed interest in seeing the Mercy Bowl return for various contemporary charitable causes. Similar sentiments were expressed in a 2012 ESPN story.

== Campus memorials at Cal Poly ==
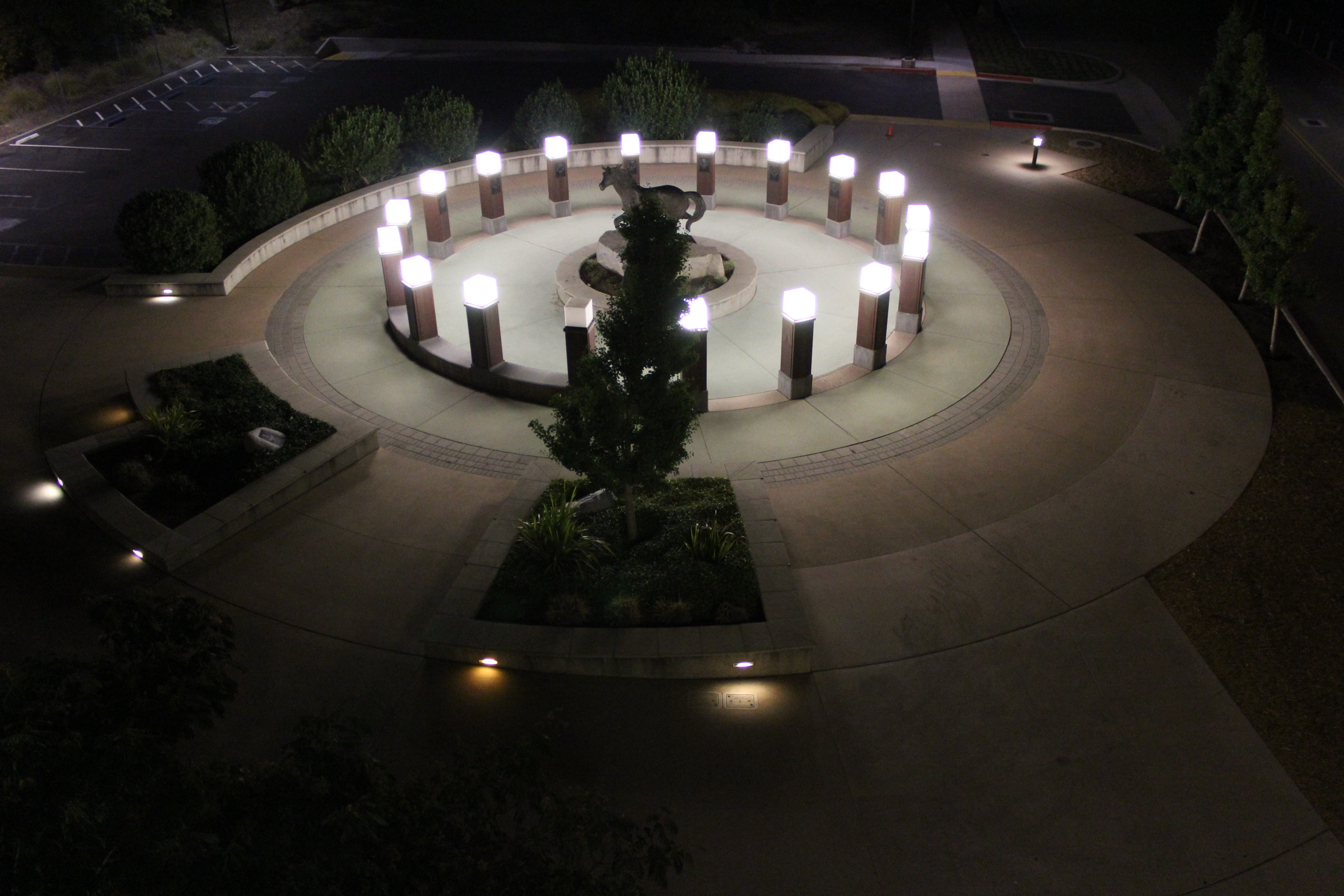
The 1960 Cal Poly Football Team memorial at Alex G. Spanos Stadium is shown illuminated at night in July 2016.

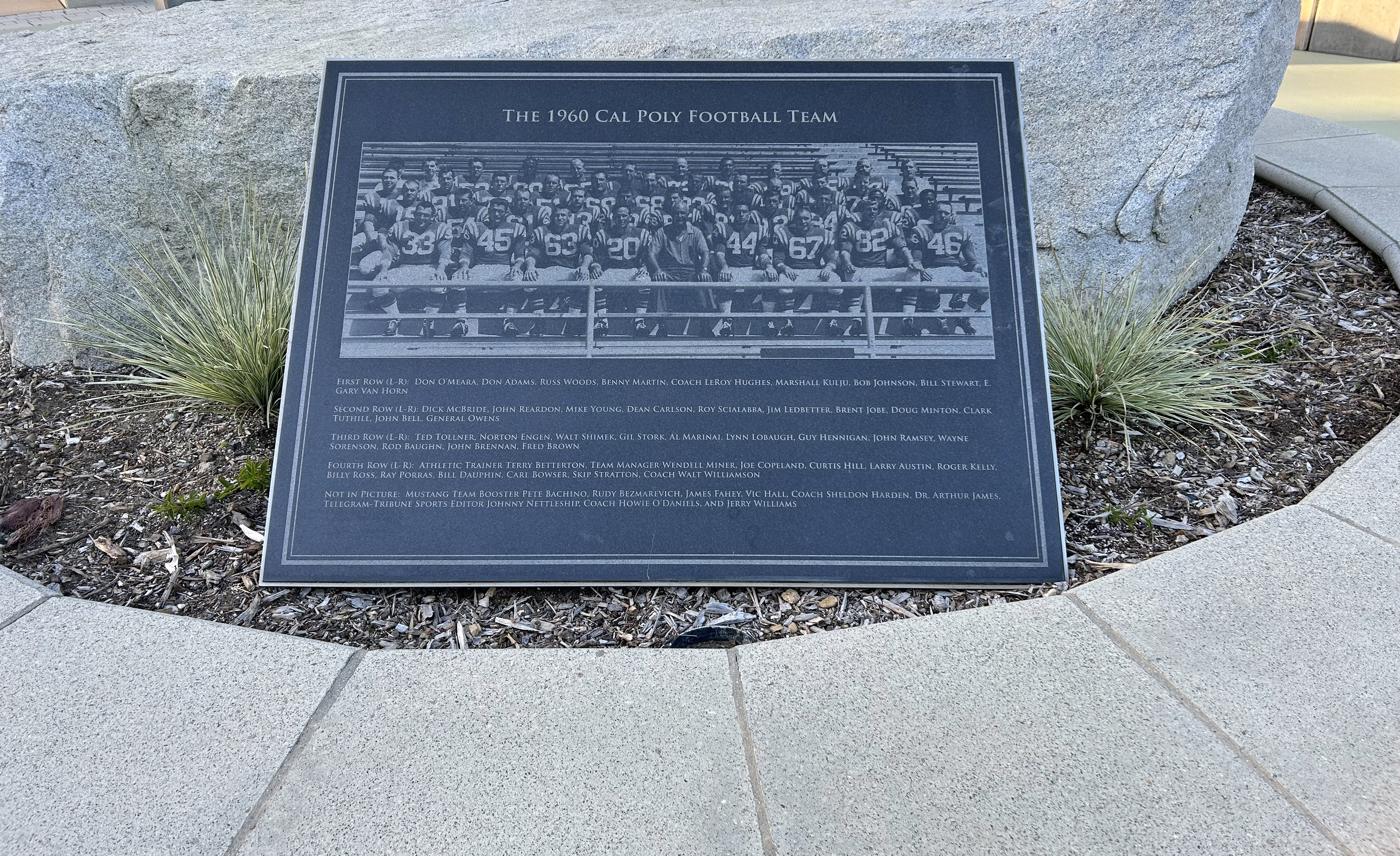
A plaque for the 1960 Cal Poly football team is shown at its display near the southwest corner of Mustang Memorial Field in San Luis Obispo, California.

There are memorial plaques for the crash on the Cal Poly campus at Mott Athletics Center and the Mustang horse statue. A permanent memorial plaza opened with the new Alex G. Spanos Stadium. The memorial has 18 copper pillars, one for each of the Cal Poly-affiliated people who died in the crash. Each pillar's height is proportional to the age of the person honored and is adorned with a plaque about that person's life.

== See also ==
- List of accidents involving sports teams
