= Cox Stadium =

Stadium in San Francisco, California

- Interactive map of Cox Stadium
- Location: San Francisco, California
- Coordinates: 37.7246539°N 122.4783054°W
- Owner: San Francisco State University
- Capacity: 5,500
- Surface: Lawn

Tenants
- San Francisco State Gators teams: Football (1946–1994); Men's soccer; Women's soccer; Track and field

Website
- sfstategators.com/cox-stadium

Cox Stadium is a multi-purpose stadium on the campus of San Francisco State University in San Francisco, California.

== Tenants ==
SFSU men's and women's soccer and track and field teams use Cox Stadium. The school's athletic teams, called the Gators, compete in the California Collegiate Athletic Association Division II of the NCAA. Cox Stadium also hosts the university's annual commencement celebration. Additionally, the stadium is open to the campus and surrounding community for recreational purposes.
