= 1964 Northeast Louisiana State Indians football team =

American college football season

1964 Northeast Louisiana State Indians football
- Conference: Gulf States Conference
- Record: 0–8 (0–5 GSC)
- Head coach: Dixie B. White (1st season)
- Home stadium: Brown Stadium

1964 Gulf States Conference football standings
	Conf.					Overall
Team	W		L		T	W		L		T
Louisiana Tech $	5	–	0	–	0	9	–	1	–	0
Southeastern Louisiana	4	–	1	–	0	6	–	3	–	0
McNeese State	3	–	2	–	0	6	–	3	–	0
Southwestern Louisiana	2	–	3	–	0	5	–	4	–	0
Northwestern State	1	–	4	–	0	4	–	5	–	0
Northeast Louisiana State	0	–	5	–	0	0	–	8	–	0
$ – Conference champion

The 1964 Northeast Louisiana State Indians football team was an American football team that represented Northeast Louisiana State College (now known as the University of Louisiana at Monroe) in the Gulf States Conference during the 1964 NCAA College Division football season. In their first year under head coach Dixie B. White, the team compiled an 0–8 record.

== Schedule ==
Date	Opponent	Site	Result	Attendance	Source
September 19	at Delta State*	Delta Field; Cleveland, MS	L 6–7	4,000	
October 3	Northwestern State	Brown Stadium; Monroe, LA (rivalry)	L 6–27	5,100	
October 10	at Howard (AL)*	Seibert Stadium; Homewood, AL	L 17–20	4,200	
October 17	at McNeese State	Wildcat Stadium; Lake Charles, LA	L 6–21	6,000–6,200	
October 24	at Southeastern Louisiana	Strawberry Stadium; Hammond, LA	L 10–20	6,400	
October 31	Tampa*^{†}	Brown Stadium; Monroe, LA	L 6–7	5,500–7,000	
November 7	at Southwestern Louisiana	McNaspy Stadium; Lafayette, LA (rivalry)	L 7–23	7,000–10,000	
November 21	Louisiana Tech	Brown Stadium; Monroe, LA (rivalry)	L 0–23	6,000	
*Non-conference game; ^{†}Homecoming
