= 1963 Southwestern Louisiana Bulldogs football team =

American college football season

1963 Southwestern Louisiana Bulldogs football
- Conference: Gulf States Conference
- Record: 4–5 (1–4 GSC)
- Head coach: Russ Faulkinberry (3rd season)
- Home stadium: McNaspy Stadium

1963 Gulf States Conference football standings
	Conf.					Overall
Team	W		L		T	W		L		T
McNeese State $	5	–	0	–	0	8	–	0	–	0
Louisiana Tech	3	–	2	–	0	6	–	3	–	0
Southeastern Louisiana	3	–	2	–	0	4	–	4	–	1
Northwestern State	2	–	3	–	0	4	–	6	–	0
Southwestern Louisiana	1	–	4	–	0	4	–	5	–	0
Northeast Louisiana State	1	–	4	–	0	4	–	6	–	0
$ – Conference champion

The 1963 Southwestern Louisiana Bulldogs football team was an American football team that represented the University of Southwestern Louisiana (now known as the University of Louisiana at Lafayette) in the Gulf States Conference during the 1963 NCAA College Division football season. In their third year under head coach Russ Faulkinberry, the team compiled a 4–5 record.

The Bulldogs season finale at McNeese State was originally scheduled for November 23 but postponed to November 26 in deference to the assassination of John F. Kennedy which occurred on November 22.

== Schedule ==
Date	Opponent	Site	Result	Attendance	Source
September 20	at Southeastern Louisiana	Strawberry Stadium; Hammond, LA (rivalry)	L 0–14	8,500	
September 28	Hardin–Simmons*	McNaspy Stadium; Lafayette, LA	W 16–6	8,000–8,500	
October 5	at Tampa*	Phillips Field; Tampa, FL	W 19–17	4,000	
October 12	at Louisiana Tech	Tech Stadium; Ruston, LA (rivalry)	L 0–45	8,500	
October 26	Louisiana College*	McNaspy Stadium; Lafayette, LA	W 7–6	11,000	
November 2	Southern Miss*	McNaspy Stadium; Lafayette, LA	L 0–28	4,500–6,000	
November 9	at Northeast Louisiana State	Brown Stadium; Monroe, LA (rivalry)	L 6–7	4,000	
November 16	Northwestern State	McNaspy Stadium; Lafayette, LA	W 19–13	4,000	
November 26	No. 8 McNeese State	McNaspy Stadium; Lafayette, LA (rivalry)	L 7–14	7,500–8,000	
*Non-conference game; Rankings from AP Poll released prior to the game
