= 1962 Louisiana Tech Bulldogs football team =

American college football season

1962 Louisiana Tech Bulldogs football
- Conference: Gulf States Conference
- Record: 4–4 (2–3 GSC)
- Head coach: Joe Aillet (22nd season)
- Captains: Pat Collins; Jerry Griffin; Mickey Slaughter
- Home stadium: Tech Stadium

1962 Gulf States Conference football standings
	Conf.					Overall
Team	W		L		T	W		L		T
Northwestern State $	4	–	1	–	0	7	–	2	–	1
McNeese State	3	–	2	–	0	6	–	2	–	1
Southeastern Louisiana	3	–	2	–	0	6	–	3	–	0
Louisiana Tech	2	–	3	–	0	4	–	4	–	0
Southwestern Louisiana	2	–	3	–	0	4	–	5	–	1
Northeast Louisiana State	1	–	4	–	0	2	–	6	–	0
$ – Conference champion

The 1962 Louisiana Tech Bulldogs football team was an American football team that represented the Louisiana Polytechnic Institute (now known as Louisiana Tech University) as a member of the Gulf States Conference during the 1962 NCAA College Division football season. In their twenty-second year under head coach Joe Aillet, the team compiled a 4–4 record.

== Schedule ==
Date	Opponent	Site	Result	Attendance	Source
September 29	McNeese State	Tech Stadium; Ruston, LA	W 14–6	7,500	
October 6	at Southwestern Louisiana	McNaspy Stadium; Lafayette, LA (rivalry)	L 6–13	12,000	
October 13	Arlington State*	Tech Stadium; Ruston, LA	W 19–9	7,500	
October 20	vs. Northwestern State	State Fair Stadium; Shreveport, LA (rivalry)	L 2–19	22,000	
October 27	Tennessee Tech*	Tech Stadium; Ruston, LA	W 33–20	7,500	
November 3	Southeastern Louisiana	Tech Stadium; Ruston, LA	W 27–15	7,500	
November 10	at Northeast Louisiana State	Brown Stadium; Monroe, LA (rivalry)	L 6–13	6,000	
November 17	at No. 3 Southern Miss*	Faulkner Field; Hattiesburg, MS (rivalry)	L 18–29	12,000	
*Non-conference game; Rankings from AP Poll released prior to the game
