= 1962 Northeast Louisiana State Indians football team =

American college football season

1962 Northeast Louisiana State Indians football
- Conference: Gulf States Conference
- Record: 2–6 (1–4 GSC)
- Head coach: Jack C. Rowan (5th season)
- Home stadium: Brown Stadium

1962 Gulf States Conference football standings
	Conf.					Overall
Team	W		L		T	W		L		T
Northwestern State $	4	–	1	–	0	7	–	2	–	1
McNeese State	3	–	2	–	0	6	–	2	–	1
Southeastern Louisiana	3	–	2	–	0	6	–	3	–	0
Louisiana Tech	2	–	3	–	0	4	–	4	–	0
Southwestern Louisiana	2	–	3	–	0	4	–	5	–	1
Northeast Louisiana State	1	–	4	–	0	2	–	6	–	0
$ – Conference champion

The 1962 Northeast Louisiana State Indians football team was an American football team that represented Northeast Louisiana State College (now known as the University of Louisiana at Monroe) in the Gulf States Conference during the 1962 NCAA College Division football season. In their fifth year under head coach Jack C. Rowan, the team compiled a 2–6 record.

== Schedule ==
Date	Opponent	Site	Result	Attendance	Source
September 22	Lamar Tech*	Brown Stadium; Monroe, LA	L 0–14	5,800–6,000	
September 29	at East Texas State*	Memorial Stadium; Commerce, TX	W 14–12	6,000	
October 6	Northwestern State	Brown Stadium; Monroe, LA (rivalry)	L 17–18	6,000	
October 13	at McNeese State	Wildcat Stadium; Lake Charles, LA	L 8–13	6,000–7,000	
October 20	at Southeastern Louisiana	Strawberry Stadium; Hammond, LA	L 12–13	7,000	
October 27	vs. Southwestern Louisiana	State Fair Stadium; Shreveport, LA (rivalry)	L 10–18	2,500–3,000	
November 10	Louisiana Tech	Brown Stadium; Monroe, LA (rivalry)	W 13–6	6,000	
November 17	at Delta State*	Delta Field; Cleveland, MS	L 0–12	200	
*Non-conference game
