= 1965 Northeast Louisiana State Indians football team =

American college football season

1965 Northeast Louisiana State Indians football
- Conference: Gulf States Conference
- Record: 1–8 (0–5 GSC)
- Head coach: Dixie B. White (2nd season)
- Home stadium: Brown Stadium

1965 Gulf States Conference football standings
	Conf.					Overall
Team	W		L		T	W		L		T
Southwestern Louisiana +	4	–	1	–	0	6	–	3	–	0
McNeese State +	4	–	1	–	0	5	–	4	–	0
Louisiana Tech	3	–	2	–	0	4	–	4	–	0
Northwestern State	2	–	3	–	0	5	–	3	–	0
Southeastern Louisiana	2	–	3	–	0	5	–	4	–	0
Northeast Louisiana State	0	–	5	–	0	1	–	8	–	0
+ – Conference co-champions

The 1965 Northeast Louisiana State Indians football team was an American football team that represented Northeast Louisiana State College (now known as the University of Louisiana at Monroe) in the Gulf States Conference during the 1965 NCAA College Division football season. In their second year under head coach Dixie B. White, the team compiled a 1–8 record.

== Schedule ==
Date	Opponent	Site	Result	Attendance	Source
September 18	at Southeast Missouri State*	Houck Stadium; Cape Girardeau, MO	W 5–0	2,500	
September 25	Delta State*	Brown Stadium; Monroe, LA	L 0–23		
October 2	at Northwestern State	Demon Stadium; Natchitoches, LA (rivalry)	L 12–17		
October 9	at Louisiana College*	Alumni Stadium; Pineville, LA	L 12–13	4,500	
October 16	McNeese State	Brown Stadium; Monroe, LA	L 6–14	3,500	
October 23	Southeastern Louisiana	Brown Stadium; Monroe, LA	L 6–14		
October 30	East Carolina*	Brown Stadium; Monroe, LA	L 0–45	2,000	
November 6	at Southwestern Louisiana	McNaspy Stadium; Lafayette, LA (rivalry)	L 10–14	11,000	
November 20	at Louisiana Tech	Tech Stadium; Ruston, LA (rivalry)	L 7–54	9,000	
*Non-conference game
