= 1966 Northeast Louisiana State Indians football team =

American college football season

1966 Northeast Louisiana State Indians football
- Conference: Gulf States Conference
- Record: 7–3 (2–3 GSC)
- Head coach: Dixie B. White (3rd season)
- Home stadium: Brown Stadium, Ouachita Stadium

1966 Gulf States Conference football standings
	Conf.					Overall
Team	W		L		T	W		L		T
No. 4 Northwestern State $	5	–	0	–	0	9	–	0	–	0
Southwestern Louisiana	3	–	2	–	0	6	–	4	–	0
McNeese State	3	–	2	–	0	5	–	5	–	0
Northeast Louisiana State	2	–	3	–	0	7	–	3	–	0
Southeastern Louisiana	1	–	4	–	0	3	–	6	–	0
Louisiana Tech	1	–	4	–	0	1	–	9	–	0
$ – Conference champion; Rankings from NAIA poll

The 1966 Northeast Louisiana State Indians football team was an American football team that represented Northeast Louisiana State College (now known as the University of Louisiana at Monroe) in the Gulf States Conference during the 1966 NCAA College Division football season. In their third year under head coach Dixie B. White, the team compiled a 7–3 record.

== Schedule ==
Date	Opponent	Site	Result	Attendance	Source
September 17	Southeast Missouri State*	Ouachita Stadium; Monroe, LA	W 20–9		
September 24	at East Carolina*	Ficklen Memorial Stadium; Greenville, NC	W 21–14	14,000	
October 1	Northwestern State	Brown Stadium; Monroe, LA (rivalry)	L 14–23	6,000	
October 8	Louisiana College*^{†}	Ouachita Stadium; Monroe, LA	W 41–0	7,000	
October 15	at McNeese State	Cowboy Stadium; Lake Charles, LA	L 17–18	9,000	
October 22	at Southeastern Louisiana	Strawberry Stadium; Hammond, LA	L 13–14		
October 29	Southwestern Louisiana	Brown Stadium; Monroe, LA (rivalry)	W 10–7	6,000	
November 5	at Tampa*	Phillips Field; Tampa, FL	W 17–0	6,000–8,000	
November 12	at Delta State*	Delta Field; Cleveland, MS	W 14–10		
November 19	Louisiana Tech	Brown Stadium; Monroe, LA (rivalry)	W 14–6	7,000	
*Non-conference game; ^{†}Homecoming
