= 1966 Louisiana Tech Bulldogs football team =

American college football season

1966 Louisiana Tech Bulldogs football
- Conference: Gulf States Conference
- Record: 1–9 (1–4 GSC)
- Head coach: Joe Aillet (26th season)
- Captains: Paul Clark; Bob McKinnon; Jim Stringer
- Home stadium: Tech Stadium

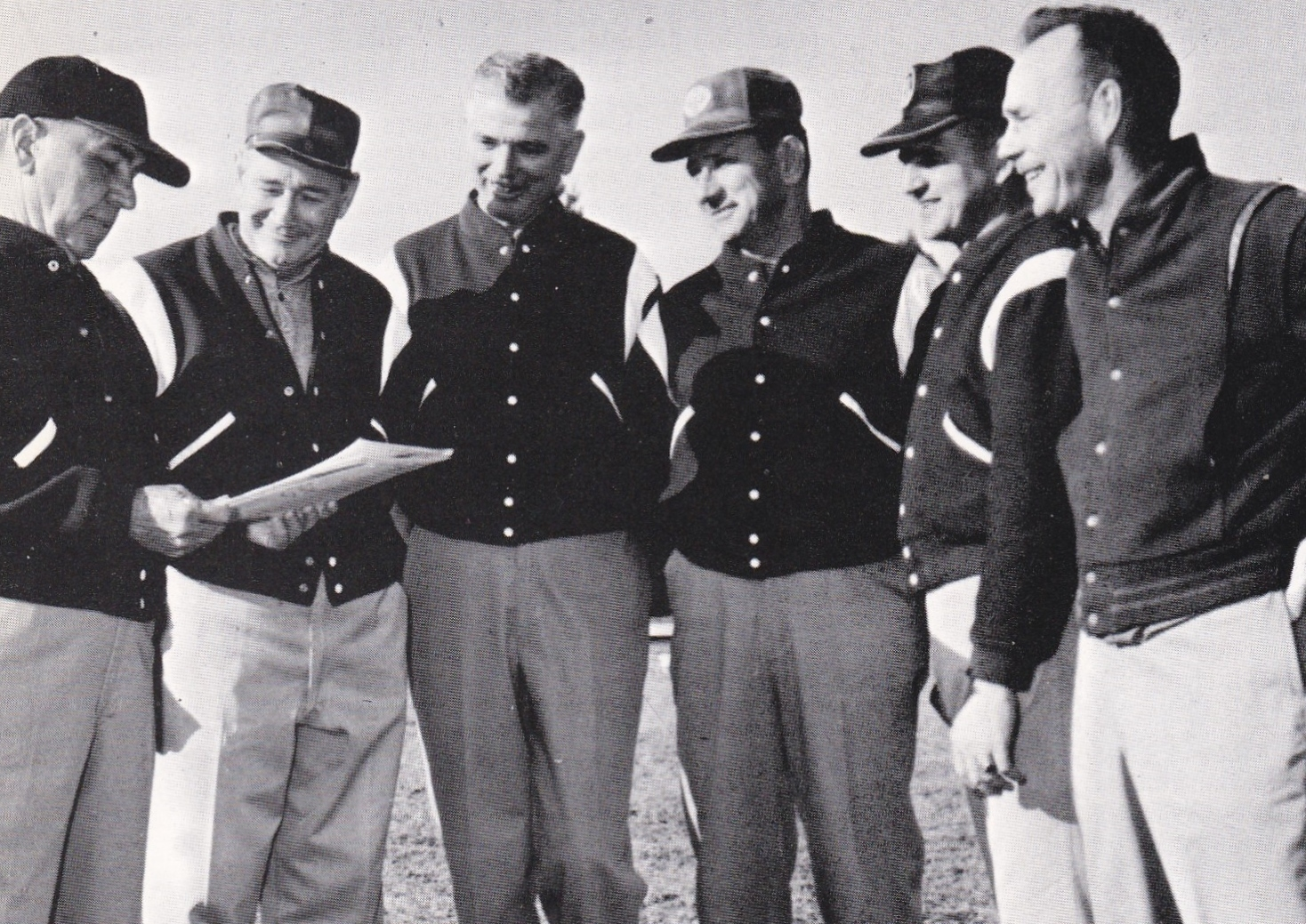
Louisiana Tech football coaching team of 1966

1966 Gulf States Conference football standings
	Conf.					Overall
Team	W		L		T	W		L		T
No. 4 Northwestern State $	5	–	0	–	0	9	–	0	–	0
Southwestern Louisiana	3	–	2	–	0	6	–	4	–	0
McNeese State	3	–	2	–	0	5	–	5	–	0
Northeast Louisiana State	2	–	3	–	0	7	–	3	–	0
Southeastern Louisiana	1	–	4	–	0	3	–	6	–	0
Louisiana Tech	1	–	4	–	0	1	–	9	–	0
$ – Conference champion; Rankings from NAIA poll

The 1966 Louisiana Tech Bulldogs football team was an American football team that represented the Louisiana Polytechnic Institute (now known as Louisiana Tech University) as a member of the Gulf States Conference during the 1966 NCAA College Division football season. In their twenty-sixth year under head coach Joe Aillet, the team compiled a 1–9 record.

== Schedule ==
Date	Opponent	Site	Result	Attendance	Source
September 17	at Southern Miss*	Faulkner Field; Hattiesburg, MS (rivalry)	L 0–14	10,000	
September 24	at No. 3 Alabama*	Legion Field; Birmingham, AL	L 0–34	65,000	
October 1	McNeese State	Tech Stadium; Ruston, LA	L 7–10	10,000	
October 8	at Arkansas State*	Kays Stadium; Jonesboro, AR	L 13–26	7,200	
October 15	at Southwestern Louisiana	McNaspy Stadium; Lafayette, LA (rivalry)	L 12–21	15,000	
October 22	vs. Northwestern State	State Fair Stadium; Shreveport, LA (rivalry)	L 7–28	25,000	
October 29	at Tennessee Tech*	Tucker Stadium; Cookeville, TN	L 9–21	3,500	
November 5	Southeastern Louisiana	Tech Stadium; Ruston, LA	W 13–6	10,000	
November 12	at Lamar Tech*	Cardinal Stadium; Beaumont, TX	L 16–31	10,000	
November 19	at Northeast Louisiana State	Brown Stadium; Monroe, LA (rivalry)	L 6–14	7,000	
*Non-conference game; Rankings from AP Poll released prior to the game
