= 1968 Northeast Louisiana State Indians football team =

American college football season

1968 Northeast Louisiana State Indians football
- Conference: Gulf States Conference
- Record: 6–4 (3–2 GSC)
- Head coach: Dixie B. White (5th season)
- Home stadium: Brown Stadium

1968 Gulf States Conference football standings
	Conf.					Overall
Team	W		L		T	W		L		T
No. 8/10 Southwestern Louisiana $	4	–	1	–	0	8	–	2	–	0
Louisiana Tech	3	–	2	–	0	9	–	2	–	0
Northeast Louisiana State	3	–	2	–	0	6	–	4	–	0
Northwestern State	2	–	3	–	0	5	–	4	–	0
Southeastern Louisiana	2	–	3	–	0	4	–	6	–	0
McNeese State	1	–	4	–	0	4	–	6	–	0
$ – Conference champion; Rankings from NAIA poll and AP small college poll

The 1968 Northeast Louisiana State Indians football team was an American football team that represented Northeast Louisiana State College (now known as the University of Louisiana at Monroe) in the Gulf States Conference during the 1968 NCAA College Division football season. In their fifth year under head coach Dixie B. White, the team compiled a 6–4 record.

== Schedule ==
Date	Opponent	Site	Result	Attendance	Source
September 21	at UT Arlington*	Memorial Stadium; Arlington, TX	L 14–24	9,500	
September 28	Stephen F. Austin*	Brown Stadium; Monroe, LA	W 42–0	7,700	
October 5	Northwestern State	Brown Stadium; Monroe, LA (rivalry)	L 3–7	8,400	
October 12	at Quantico Marines*	Butler Stadium; Quantico, VA	W 13–0	6,200	
October 19	at McNeese State	Cowboy Stadium; Lake Charles, LA	W 21–14	12,200	
October 26	at Southeastern Louisiana	Strawberry Stadium; Hammond, LA	W 13–0	7,800	
November 2	Southwestern Louisiana	Brown Stadium; Monroe, LA (rivalry)	W 20–7	8,500	
November 9	Pensacola NAS*	Brown Stadium; Monroe, LA	W 31–14	6,900	
November 16	at Delta State*	Delta Field; Cleveland, MS	L 10–3	3,000	
November 23	Louisiana Tech	Brown Stadium; Monroe, LA (rivalry)	L 10–25	12,000	
*Non-conference game
