= 1969 Northeast Louisiana Indians football team =

American college football season

1969 Northeast Louisiana Indians football
- Conference: Gulf States Conference
- Record: 1–9 (0–5 GSC)
- Head coach: Dixie B. White (6th season)
- Home stadium: Brown Stadium

1969 Gulf States Conference football standings
	Conf.					Overall
Team	W		L		T	W		L		T
Louisiana Tech $	5	–	0	–	0	8	–	2	–	0
Northwestern State	4	–	1	–	0	7	–	2	–	0
Southwestern Louisiana	3	–	2	–	0	5	–	5	–	0
Southeastern Louisiana	2	–	3	–	0	5	–	5	–	0
McNeese State	1	–	4	–	0	4	–	6	–	0
Northeast Louisiana	0	–	5	–	0	1	–	9	–	0
$ – Conference champion

The 1969 Northeast Louisiana Indians football team was an American football team that represented Northeast Louisiana University (now known as the University of Louisiana at Monroe) in the Gulf States Conference during the 1969 NCAA College Division football season. In their sixth year under head coach Dixie B. White, the team compiled a 1–9 record.

== Schedule ==
Date	Opponent	Site	Result	Attendance	Source
September 20	UT Arlington*	Brown Stadium; Monroe, LA	L 3–17	7,800	
September 27	at Quantico Marines*	Butler Stadium; Quantico, VA	L 7–20	7,800	
October 4	at Northwestern State	Demon Stadium; Natchitoches, LA (rivalry)	L 10–28	8,500	
October 11	Chattanooga*	Brown Stadium; Monroe, LA	L 7–12	6,500	
October 18	McNeese State	Brown Stadium; Monroe, LA	L 27–41	8,000	
October 25	Southeastern Louisiana	Brown Stadium; Monroe, LA	L 10–20	3,500	
November 1	at Southwestern Louisiana	McNaspy Stadium; Lafayette, LA (rivalry)	L 7–9	12,000	
November 8	at Pensacola NAS*	Pensacola, FL	L 24–28	3,000	
November 15	Delta State*	Brown Stadium; Monroe, LA	W 31–7	4,500	
November 22	at Louisiana Tech	Louisiana Tech Stadium; Ruston, LA (rivalry)	L 6–34	13,000	
*Non-conference game
