= 1963 McNeese State Cowboys football team =

American college football season

1963 McNeese State Cowboys football

GSC champion
- Conference: Gulf States Conference
- Record: 8–0 (5–0 GSC)
- Head coach: Les DeVall (7th season)
- Home stadium: Wildcat Stadium

1963 Gulf States Conference football standings
	Conf.					Overall
Team	W		L		T	W		L		T
McNeese State $	5	–	0	–	0	8	–	0	–	0
Louisiana Tech	3	–	2	–	0	6	–	3	–	0
Southeastern Louisiana	3	–	2	–	0	4	–	4	–	1
Northwestern State	2	–	3	–	0	4	–	6	–	0
Southwestern Louisiana	1	–	4	–	0	4	–	5	–	0
Northeast Louisiana State	1	–	4	–	0	4	–	6	–	0
$ – Conference champion

The 1963 McNeese State Cowboys football team was an American football team that represented McNeese State College (now known as McNeese State University) as a member of the Gulf States Conference (GSC) during the 1963 NCAA College Division football season. In their seventh year under head coach Les DeVall, the team compiled an overall record of 8–0 with a mark of 5–0 in conference play, and finished as GSC champion.

The Cowboys season finale against Southwestern Louisiana was originally scheduled for November 23 but postponed to November 26 in deference to the assassination of John F. Kennedy which occurred on November 22.

== Schedule ==
Date	Opponent	Rank	Site	Result	Attendance	Source
September 28	Louisiana Tech		Wildcat Stadium; Lake Charles, LA	W 27–6	7,000	
October 5	Howard (AL)*		Wildcat Stadium; Lake Charles, LA	W 28–0	5,500	
October 12	Tampa*		Wildcat Stadium; Lake Charles, LA	W 37–12	6,000	
October 19	at Northeast Louisiana State	No. 10	Brown Stadium; Monroe, LA	W 20–8	4,500	
November 2	at Louisiana College*		Alumni Stadium; Pineville, LA	W 40–0	5,000	
November 9	at Northwestern State	No. 9	Demon Stadium; Natchitoches, LA (rivalry)	W 21–13	6,000	
November 16	Southeastern Louisiana	No. 9	Wildcat Stadium; Lake Charles, LA	W 35–6	8,000	
November 26	at Southwestern Louisiana	No. 8	McNaspy Stadium; Lafayette, LA (rivalry)	W 14–7	7,500–8,000	
*Non-conference game; Rankings from AP Poll released prior to the game
