= 1964 Louisiana Tech Bulldogs football team =

American college football season

1964 Louisiana Tech Bulldogs football

GSC champion
- Conference: Gulf States Conference
- Record: 9–1 (5–0 GSC)
- Head coach: Joe Aillet (24th season)
- Captains: Pat Lynch; Robert Malone; Kenny Tidwell
- Home stadium: Tech Stadium

1964 Gulf States Conference football standings
	Conf.					Overall
Team	W		L		T	W		L		T
Louisiana Tech $	5	–	0	–	0	9	–	1	–	0
Southeastern Louisiana	4	–	1	–	0	6	–	3	–	0
McNeese State	3	–	2	–	0	6	–	3	–	0
Southwestern Louisiana	2	–	3	–	0	5	–	4	–	0
Northwestern State	1	–	4	–	0	4	–	5	–	0
Northeast Louisiana State	0	–	5	–	0	0	–	8	–	0
$ – Conference champion

The 1964 Louisiana Tech Bulldogs football team was an American football team that represented the Louisiana Polytechnic Institute (now known as Louisiana Tech University) as a member of the Gulf States Conference during the 1964 NCAA College Division football season. In their twenty-fourth year under head coach Joe Aillet, the team compiled a 9–1 record.

== Schedule ==
Date	Opponent	Rank	Site	Result	Attendance	Source
September 19	at Louisiana College*		Alumni Stadium; Pineville, LA	W 8–7	7,500	
September 26	McNeese State		Tech Stadium; Ruston, LA	W 10–6	9,500	
October 3	East Texas State*	No. 7	Tech Stadium; Ruston, LA	W 15–7	7,500	
October 10	at Southwestern Louisiana	No. 6	McNaspy Stadium; Lafayette, LA (rivalry)	W 6–3	7,500	
October 17	Arlington State*	No. 9	Tech Stadium; Ruston, LA	W 19–7	7,500	
October 24	vs. Northwestern State	No. 6	State Fair Stadium; Shreveport, LA (rivalry)	W 16–7	27,000–30,000	
October 31	Tennessee Tech*	No. 6	Tech Stadium; Ruston, LA	W 25–6	7,500	
November 7	Southeastern Louisiana	No. 4	Tech Stadium; Ruston, LA	W 28–7	8,500	
November 14	at Southern Miss*	No. 2	Faulkner Field; Hattiesburg, MS (rivalry)	L 7–14	10,000	
November 21	at Northeast Louisiana State	No. 4	Brown Stadium; Monroe, LA (rivalry)	W 23–0	6,000	
*Non-conference game; Rankings from AP Poll released prior to the game
