= Northwestern State Demons football, 1960–1969 =

American college football seasons

The Northwestern State Demons football program, 1960–1969 represented Northwestern State College of Louisiana (now known as Northwestern State University) as a member of the Gulf States Conference (GSC) during the decade of the 1960s. During this time, the Demons were led by two different head coaches and had an overall record for the decade of 57–35–1. During this decade, the Demons played their home games on campus at Demon Stadium in Natchitoches, Louisiana.

From 1960 to 1966 Jack Clayton served as head coach at Northwestern State and led the Demons to an overall record of 37–26–1 during this period. He led the team to GSC championships in 1962 and 1966, which was also an undefeated season. Clayton resigned from his position of head coach after the 1966 season, but remained at the school as its athletic director. Glenn Gossett was promoted to head coach in December 1966. Through the end of the decade, he led the demons to an overall record of 18–9.

== 1960 ==
1960 Northwestern State Demons football
- Conference: Gulf States Conference
- Record: 3–6 (0–5 GSC)
- Head coach: Jack Clayton (4th season)
- Home stadium: Demon Stadium

1960 Gulf States Conference football standings
	Conf.					Overall
Team	W		L		T	W		L		T
No. 5 Southeastern Louisiana +	4	–	1	–	0	9	–	1	–	0
No. 12 Louisiana Tech +	4	–	1	–	0	8	–	2	–	0
McNeese State	3	–	2	–	0	7	–	3	–	0
Southwestern Louisiana	3	–	2	–	0	6	–	4	–	0
Northeast Louisiana State	1	–	4	–	0	3	–	7	–	0
Northwestern State	0	–	5	–	0	3	–	6	–	0
+ – Conference co-champions; Rankings from NAIA poll

The 1960 Northwestern State Demons football team was an American football team that represented Northwestern State College of Louisiana (now known as Northwestern State University) as a member of the Gulf States Conference (GSC) during the 1960 NCAA College Division football season. In their fourth year under head coach Jack Clayton, the team compiled an overall record of 3–6 with a mark of 0–5 in conference play, and finished sixth in the GSC. Northwestern State played their home games on campus at Demon Stadium in Natchitoches, Louisiana.

Schedule

Date	Opponent	Site	Result	Attendance	Source
September 17	vs. Stephen F. Austin*	State Fair Stadium; Shreveport, LA (rivalry)	W 14–0	7,133	
September 24	Lamar Tech*	Demon Stadium; Natchitoches, LA	L 13–21	6,500	
October 1	Louisiana College*	Demon Stadium; Natchitoches, LA	W 14–6	7,000	
October 8	at Northeast Louisiana State	Brown Stadium; Monroe, LA	L 6–7	5,000	
October 22	vs. Louisiana Tech	State Fair Stadium; Shreveport, LA (rivalry)	L 7–13	18,000–18,500	
October 29	at Pensacola Navy*	NAS Pensacola; Pensacola, FL	W 14–0		
November 5	at McNeese State	Wildcat Stadium; Lake Charles, LA (rivalry)	L 7–20	6,000	
November 12	Southwestern Louisiana^{†}	Demon Stadium; Natchitoches, LA	L 7–17	3,300	
November 19	Southeastern Louisiana	Demon Stadium; Natchitoches, LA (rivalry)	L 0–7		
*Non-conference game; ^{†}Homecoming

== 1962 ==
1962 Northwestern State Demons football

GSC champion
- Conference: Gulf States Conference
- Record: 7–2–1 (4–1 GSC)
- Head coach: Jack Clayton (6th season)
- Home stadium: Demon Stadium

1962 Gulf States Conference football standings
	Conf.					Overall
Team	W		L		T	W		L		T
Northwestern State $	4	–	1	–	0	7	–	2	–	1
McNeese State	3	–	2	–	0	6	–	2	–	1
Southeastern Louisiana	3	–	2	–	0	6	–	3	–	0
Louisiana Tech	2	–	3	–	0	4	–	4	–	0
Southwestern Louisiana	2	–	3	–	0	4	–	5	–	1
Northeast Louisiana State	1	–	4	–	0	2	–	6	–	0
$ – Conference champion

The 1962 Northwestern State Demons football team was an American football team that represented Northwestern State College of Louisiana (now known as Northwestern State University) as a member of the Gulf States Conference (GSC) during the 1962 NCAA College Division football season. In their sixth year under head coach Jack Clayton, the team compiled an overall record of 7–2–1 with a mark of 4–1 in conference play, and finished as GSC champion. Northwestern State played their home games on campus at Demon Stadium in Natchitoches, Louisiana.

Schedule

Date	Opponent	Site	Result	Attendance	Source
September 15	vs. Stephen F. Austin*	State Fair Stadium; Shreveport, LA (rivalry)	W 23–6		
September 22	at Florence State*	Coffee Stadium; Florence, AL	L 14–21		
September 29	Louisiana College*	Demon Stadium; Natchitoches, LA	T 7–7		
October 6	at Northeast Louisiana State	Brown Stadium; Monroe, LA	W 18–17	6,000	
October 13	Tarleton State*	Demon Stadium; Natchitoches, LA	W 31–6		
October 20	vs. Louisiana Tech	State Fair Stadium; Shreveport, LA (rivalry)	W 19–2	22,000	
October 26	at Instituto Politécnico Nacional*	Estadio Universitario; Mexico City, Mexico	W 52–6		
November 3	at McNeese State	Wildcat Stadium; Lake Charles, LA (rivalry)	L 6–26	6,500	
November 10	Southwestern Louisiana	Demon Stadium; Natchitoches, LA	W 20–0	4,300	
November 17	Southeastern Louisiana	Demon Stadium; Natchitoches, LA (rivalry)	W 19–6	3,000	
*Non-conference game

== 1963 ==
1963 Northwestern State Demons football
- Conference: Gulf States Conference
- Record: 4–6 (2–3 GSC)
- Head coach: Jack Clayton (7th season)
- Home stadium: Demon Stadium

1963 Gulf States Conference football standings
	Conf.					Overall
Team	W		L		T	W		L		T
McNeese State $	5	–	0	–	0	8	–	0	–	0
Louisiana Tech	3	–	2	–	0	6	–	3	–	0
Southeastern Louisiana	3	–	2	–	0	4	–	4	–	1
Northwestern State	2	–	3	–	0	4	–	6	–	0
Southwestern Louisiana	1	–	4	–	0	4	–	5	–	0
Northeast Louisiana State	1	–	4	–	0	4	–	6	–	0
$ – Conference champion

The 1963 Northwestern State Demons football team was an American football team that represented Northwestern State College of Louisiana (now known as Northwestern State University) as a member of the Gulf States Conference (GSC) during the 1963 NCAA College Division football season. In their seventh year under head coach Jack Clayton, the team compiled an overall record of 4–6 with a mark of 2–3 in conference play, and finished fourth in the GSC. Northwestern State played their home games on campus at Demon Stadium in Natchitoches, Louisiana.

Schedule

Date	Opponent	Site	Result	Attendance	Source
September 14	vs. Stephen F. Austin*	State Fair Stadium; Shreveport, LA (rivalry)	L 0–10	5,000	
September 28	at Louisiana College*	Bolton Stadium; Alexandria, LA	L 7–13		
October 5	Northeast Louisiana State	Demon Stadium; Natchitoches, LA	W 27–19		
October 12	at Abilene Christian*	Shotwell Stadium; Abilene, TX	L 18–28		
October 19	vs. Louisiana Tech	State Fair Stadium; Shreveport, LA (rivalry)	L 13–27	18,500	
October 26	Florence State*^{†}	Demon Stadium; Natchitoches, LA	W 33–14		
November 2	Appalachian State*	Demon Stadium; Natchitoches, LA	W 33–20		
November 9	No. 9 McNeese State	Demon Stadium; Natchitoches, LA (rivalry)	L 13–21	6,000	
November 16	at Southwestern Louisiana	McNaspy Stadium; Lafayette, LA	L 13–19	4,000	
November 23	at Southeastern Louisiana	Strawberry Stadium; Hammond, LA (rivalry)	W 13–7		
*Non-conference game; ^{†}Homecoming; Rankings from AP Poll released prior to the game

== 1964 ==
1964 Northwestern State Demons football
- Conference: Gulf States Conference
- Record: 4–5 (1–4 GSC)
- Head coach: Jack Clayton (8th season)
- Home stadium: Demon Stadium

1964 Gulf States Conference football standings
	Conf.					Overall
Team	W		L		T	W		L		T
Louisiana Tech $	5	–	0	–	0	9	–	1	–	0
Southeastern Louisiana	4	–	1	–	0	6	–	3	–	0
McNeese State	3	–	2	–	0	6	–	3	–	0
Southwestern Louisiana	2	–	3	–	0	5	–	4	–	0
Northwestern State	1	–	4	–	0	4	–	5	–	0
Northeast Louisiana State	0	–	5	–	0	0	–	8	–	0
$ – Conference champion

The 1964 Northwestern State Demons football team was an American football team that represented Northwestern State College of Louisiana (now known as Northwestern State University) as a member of the Gulf States Conference (GSC) during the 1964 NCAA College Division football season. In their eighth year under head coach Jack Clayton, the team compiled an overall record of 4–5 with a mark of 1–4 in conference play, and finished fifth in the GSC. Northwestern State played their home games on campus at Demon Stadium in Natchitoches, Louisiana.

Schedule

Date	Opponent	Site	Result	Attendance	Source
September 19	vs. Stephen F. Austin*	State Fair Stadium; Shreveport, LA (rivalry)	W 34–14	8,000	
September 26	Louisiana College*	Demon Stadium; Natchitoches, LA	W 16–14	8,000	
October 3	at Northeast Louisiana State	Brown Stadium; Monroe, LA	W 27–6	5,100	
October 10	Abilene Christian*	Demon Stadium; Natchitoches, LA	L 26–36	7,000	
October 17	at Ouachita Baptist*	Cliff Harris Stadium; Arkadelphia, AR	W 48–0	1,500	
October 24	vs. No. 6 Louisiana Tech	State Fair Stadium; Shreveport, LA (rivalry)	L 7–16	28,000	
November 7	at McNeese State	Wildcat Stadium; Lake Charles, LA (rivalry)	L 10–12	6,500	
November 14	Southwestern Louisiana^{†}	Demon Stadium; Natchitoches, LA	L 17–27	6,500	
November 21	Southeastern Louisiana	Demon Stadium; Natchitoches, LA (rivalry)	L 21–37		
*Non-conference game; ^{†}Homecoming; Rankings from AP Poll released prior to the game

== 1965 ==
1965 Northwestern State Demons football
- Conference: Gulf States Conference
- Record: 5–4 (2–3 GSC)
- Head coach: Jack Clayton (9th season)
- Home stadium: Demon Stadium

1965 Gulf States Conference football standings
	Conf.					Overall
Team	W		L		T	W		L		T
Southwestern Louisiana +	4	–	1	–	0	6	–	3	–	0
McNeese State +	4	–	1	–	0	5	–	4	–	0
Louisiana Tech	3	–	2	–	0	4	–	4	–	0
Northwestern State	2	–	3	–	0	5	–	3	–	0
Southeastern Louisiana	2	–	3	–	0	5	–	4	–	0
Northeast Louisiana State	0	–	5	–	0	1	–	8	–	0
+ – Conference co-champions

The 1965 Northwestern State Demons football team was an American football team that represented Northwestern State College of Louisiana (now known as Northwestern State University) as a member of the Gulf States Conference (GSC) during the 1965 NCAA College Division football season. In their ninth year under head coach Jack Clayton, the team compiled an overall record of 5–4 with a mark of 2–3 in conference play, and finished tied for third in the GSC. Northwestern State played their home games on campus at Demon Stadium in Natchitoches, Louisiana.

Schedule

Date	Opponent	Site	Result	Attendance	Source
September 25	at Louisiana College*	Alumni Stadium; Pineville, LA	W 10–3	6,500	
October 2	Northeast Louisiana State	Demon Stadium; Natchitoches, LA	W 17–12	6,500	
October 9	at Pensacola Navy*	Kane Field; Pensacola, FL	W 31–15	4,000	
October 16	Ouachita Baptist*	Demon Stadium; Natchitoches, LA	W 16–6	7,000	
October 23	vs. Louisiana Tech	State Fair Stadium; Shreveport, LA (rivalry)	L 14–42	27,000	
October 30	at Tennessee–Martin*	Volunteer Stadium; Martin, TN	L 17–19	5,000	
November 6	McNeese State	Demon Stadium; Natchitoches, LA (rivalry)	L 21–29	5,000	
November 13	at Southwestern Louisiana	McNaspy Stadium; Lafayette, LA	L 7–41	14,000	
November 20	at Southeastern Louisiana	Strawberry Stadium; Hammond, LA (rivalry)	W 38–22	5,000	
*Non-conference game

== 1966 ==
1966 Northwestern State Demons football

GSC champion
- Conference: Gulf States Conference
- Record: 9–0 (5–0 GSC)
- Head coach: Jack Clayton (10th season)
- Home stadium: Demon Stadium

1966 Gulf States Conference football standings
	Conf.					Overall
Team	W		L		T	W		L		T
No. 4 Northwestern State $	5	–	0	–	0	9	–	0	–	0
Southwestern Louisiana	3	–	2	–	0	6	–	4	–	0
McNeese State	3	–	2	–	0	5	–	5	–	0
Northeast Louisiana State	2	–	3	–	0	7	–	3	–	0
Southeastern Louisiana	1	–	4	–	0	3	–	6	–	0
Louisiana Tech	1	–	4	–	0	1	–	9	–	0
$ – Conference champion; Rankings from NAIA poll

The 1966 Northwestern State Demons football team was an American football team that represented Northwestern State College of Louisiana (now known as Northwestern State University) as a member of the Gulf States Conference (GSC) during the 1966 NCAA College Division football season. In their tenth year under head coach Jack Clayton, the team compiled an overall record of 9–0 with a mark of 5–0 in conference play, and finished as GSC champion. Northwestern State played their home games on campus at Demon Stadium in Natchitoches, Louisiana.

At the conclusion of the season, Clayton resigned as head coach of the Demons to focus solely on serving as athletic director.

Schedule

Date	Opponent	Rank	Site	Result	Attendance	Source
September 24	Louisiana College*		Demon Stadium; Natchitoches, LA	W 49–0	7,500	
October 1	at Northeast Louisiana State		Brown Stadium; Monroe, LA	W 23–14	6,000	
October 8	at Pensacola Navy*		Kane Field; Pensacola, FL	W 34–6	2,000	
October 15	Tennessee–Martin*		Demon Stadium; Natchitoches, LA	W 26–7	7,500	
October 22	vs. Louisiana Tech		State Fair Stadium; Shreveport, LA (rivalry)	W 28–7	25,000	
October 29	at Troy State*	No. 8	Veterans Memorial Stadium; Troy, AL	W 14–7	8,500	
November 5	at McNeese State	No. 5	Cowboy Stadium; Lake Charles, LA (rivalry)	W 14–6	11,500	
November 12	Southwestern Louisiana	No. 5	Demon Stadium; Natchitoches, LA	W 21–8	10,200	
November 19	Southeastern Louisiana	No. 4	Demon Stadium; Natchitoches, LA (rivalry)	W 27–24	7,500	
*Non-conference game; Rankings from AP Poll released prior to the game

== 1967 ==
1967 Northwestern State Demons football
- Conference: Gulf States Conference
- Record: 6–3 (3–2 GSC)
- Head coach: Glenn Gossett (1st season)
- Home stadium: Demon Stadium

1967 Gulf States Conference football standings
	Conf.					Overall
Team	W		L		T	W		L		T
McNeese State $	4	–	1	–	0	4	–	5	–	0
Southwestern Louisiana	3	–	2	–	0	6	–	4	–	0
Northeast Louisiana State	3	–	2	–	0	7	–	3	–	0
Northwestern State	3	–	2	–	0	6	–	3	–	0
Southeastern Louisiana	2	–	3	–	0	4	–	5	–	0
Louisiana Tech	0	–	5	–	0	3	–	7	–	0
$ – Conference champion

The 1967 Northwestern State Demons football team was an American football team that represented Northwestern State College of Louisiana (now known as Northwestern State University) as a member of the Gulf States Conference (GSC) during the 1967 NCAA College Division football season. In their first year under head coach Glenn Gossett, the team compiled an overall record of 6–3 with a mark of 3–2 in conference play, and finished tied for second in the GSC. Northwestern State played their home games on campus at Demon Stadium in Natchitoches, Louisiana.

Gossett was hired as head coach in December 1966 after Jack Clayton resigned as head coach of the Demons to focus solely on serving as athletic director.

Schedule

Date	Opponent	Rank	Site	Result	Attendance	Source
September 16	Hanover*		Demon Stadium; Natchitoches, LA	W 49–0	7,500	
September 23	at Louisiana College*	No. 7	Alumni Stadium; Pineville, LA	W 55–6	4,500	
September 30	Northeast Louisiana State	No. 6	Demon Stadium; Natchitoches, LA	W 21–14	11,500	
October 7	Pensacola Navy*	No. 5	Demon Stadium; Natchitoches, LA	W 28–16	9,500	
October 21	vs. Louisiana Tech	No. 5	State Fair Stadium; Shreveport, LA (rivalry)	W 7–0	28,000	
October 28	Troy State*^{†}	No. 5	Demon Field; Natchitoches, LA	L 20–28	8,000	
November 4	McNeese State	No. 9	Demon Stadium; Natchitoches, LA (rivalry)	L 7–21	7,500	
November 11	at Southwestern Louisiana		McNaspy Stadium; Lafayette, LA	W 24–9	10,000	
November 18	at Southeastern Louisiana		Strawberry Stadium; Hammond, LA (rivalry)	L 14–26	5,500	
*Non-conference game; ^{†}Homecoming; Rankings from AP Poll released prior to the game

== 1968 ==
1968 Northwestern State Demons football
- Conference: Gulf States Conference
- Record: 5–4 (2–3 GSC)
- Head coach: Glenn Gossett (2nd season)
- Home stadium: Demon Stadium

1968 Gulf States Conference football standings
	Conf.					Overall
Team	W		L		T	W		L		T
No. 8/10 Southwestern Louisiana $	4	–	1	–	0	8	–	2	–	0
Louisiana Tech	3	–	2	–	0	9	–	2	–	0
Northeast Louisiana State	3	–	2	–	0	6	–	4	–	0
Northwestern State	2	–	3	–	0	5	–	4	–	0
Southeastern Louisiana	2	–	3	–	0	4	–	6	–	0
McNeese State	1	–	4	–	0	4	–	6	–	0
$ – Conference champion; Rankings from NAIA poll and AP small college poll

The 1968 Northwestern State Demons football team was an American football team that represented Northwestern State College of Louisiana (now known as Northwestern State University) as a member of the Gulf States Conference (GSC) during the 1968 NCAA College Division football season. In their second year under head coach Glenn Gossett, the team compiled an overall record of 5–4 with a mark of 2–3 in conference play, and finished tied for fourth in the GSC. Northwestern State played their home games on campus at Demon Stadium in Natchitoches, Louisiana.

Schedule

Date	Opponent	Site	Result	Attendance	Source
September 14	Abilene Christian*	Demon Stadium; Natchitoches, LA	L 16–17	5,000–9,500	
September 21	Tennessee Tech*	Demon Stadium; Natchitoches, LA	W 33–15	9,000	
September 28	Louisiana College*	Demon Stadium; Natchitoches, LA	W 39–14	9,000	
October 5	at Northeast Louisiana State	Brown Stadium; Monroe, LA	W 7–3	8,400	
October 12	Cameron State*	Demon Stadium; Natchitoches, LA	W 48–7	9,000	
October 19	vs. Louisiana Tech	State Fair Stadium; Shreveport, LA (rivalry)	L 39–42	28,000	
November 9	at McNeese State	Cowboy Stadium; Lake Charles, LA (rivalry)	W 28–12	10,500	
November 16	Southwestern Louisiana	Demon Stadium; Natchitoches, LA	L 7–14	11,000	
November 23	Southeastern Louisiana	Demon Stadium; Natchitoches, LA (rivalry)	L 19–24	7,000	
*Non-conference game

== 1969 ==
1969 Northwestern State Demons football
- Conference: Gulf States Conference
- Record: 7–2 (4–1 GSC)
- Head coach: Glenn Gossett (3rd season)
- Home stadium: Demon Stadium

1969 Gulf States Conference football standings
	Conf.					Overall
Team	W		L		T	W		L		T
Louisiana Tech $	5	–	0	–	0	8	–	2	–	0
Northwestern State	4	–	1	–	0	7	–	2	–	0
Southwestern Louisiana	3	–	2	–	0	5	–	5	–	0
Southeastern Louisiana	2	–	3	–	0	5	–	5	–	0
McNeese State	1	–	4	–	0	4	–	6	–	0
Northeast Louisiana	0	–	5	–	0	1	–	9	–	0
$ – Conference champion

The 1969 Northwestern State Demons football team was an American football team that represented Northwestern State College of Louisiana (now known as Northwestern State University) as a member of the Gulf States Conference (GSC) during the 1969 NCAA College Division football season. In their third year under head coach Glenn Gossett, the team compiled an overall record of 7–2 with a mark of 4–1 in conference play, and finished second in the GSC. Northwestern State played their home games on campus at Demon Stadium in Natchitoches, Louisiana.

Schedule

Date	Opponent	Site	Result	Attendance	Source
September 13	at Florence State*	Braly Municipal Stadium; Florence, AL	L 3–27	6,000	
September 20	at Tennessee Tech*	Overhill Field; Cookeville, TN	W 35–24	5,000	
September 27	Stephen F. Austin*	Demon Stadium; Natchitoches, LA (rivalry)	W 37–35	9,000	
October 4	Northeast Louisiana	Demon Stadium; Natchitoches, LA	W 28–10	8,500	
October 18	vs. No. 17 Louisiana Tech	State Fair Stadium; Shreveport, LA (rivalry)	L 21–42	31,000	
October 25	Jacksonville State*	Demon Stadium; Natchitoches, LA	W 48–21	7,775	
November 8	McNeese State	Demon Stadium; Natchitoches, LA (rivalry)	W 29–28	9,000	
November 15	at Southwestern Louisiana	McNaspy Stadium; Lafayette, LA	W 33–28	15,000	
November 22	at Southeastern Louisiana	Strawberry Stadium; Hammond, LA (rivalry)	W 34–6	5,000	
*Non-conference game; Rankings from AP Poll released prior to the game
