= 1965 Southwestern Louisiana Bulldogs football team =

American college football season

1965 Southwestern Louisiana Bulldogs football

GSC co-champion
- Conference: Gulf States Conference
- Record: 7–3 (4–1 GSC)
- Head coach: Russ Faulkinberry (5th season)
- Home stadium: McNaspy Stadium

1965 Gulf States Conference football standings
	Conf.					Overall
Team	W		L		T	W		L		T
Southwestern Louisiana +	4	–	1	–	0	6	–	3	–	0
McNeese State +	4	–	1	–	0	5	–	4	–	0
Louisiana Tech	3	–	2	–	0	4	–	4	–	0
Northwestern State	2	–	3	–	0	5	–	3	–	0
Southeastern Louisiana	2	–	3	–	0	5	–	4	–	0
Northeast Louisiana State	0	–	5	–	0	1	–	8	–	0
+ – Conference co-champions

The 1965 Southwestern Louisiana Bulldogs football team was an American football team that represented the University of Southwestern Louisiana (now known as the University of Louisiana at Lafayette) in the Gulf States Conference during the 1965 NCAA College Division football season. In their fifth year under head coach Russ Faulkinberry, the team compiled a 7–3 record and as Gulf States Conference co-champion.

== Schedule ==
Date	Opponent	Site	Result	Attendance	Source
September 18	Louisiana College*	McNaspy Stadium; Lafayette, LA	W 30–0	10,100	
October 2	at Southeastern Louisiana	Strawberry Stadium; Hammond, LA (rivalry)	L 0–13	8,500	
October 9	at Louisiana Tech	Tech Stadium; Ruston, LA (rivalry)	W 16–8	9,000	
October 16	at Tampa*	Phillips Field; Tampa, FL	L 6–7	10,400	
October 23	at Howard (AL)*	Seibert Stadium; Homewood, AL	W 7–0	4,000	
October 30	at No. 10 Lamar Tech*	Cardinal Stadium; Beaumont, TX (rivalry)	W 20–6	10,102	
November 6	Northeast Louisiana State	McNaspy Stadium; Lafayette, LA (rivalry)	W 14–10	11,000	
November 13	Northwestern State	McNaspy Stadium; Lafayette, LA	W 41–7	14,000	
November 20	McNeese State	McNaspy Stadium; Lafayette, LA (Cajun Crown)	W 14–7	12,000	
November 25	at Chattanooga*	Chamberlain Field; Chattanooga, TN	L 25–27	4,500	
*Non-conference game; Rankings from AP Poll released prior to the game
