= Southeastern Louisiana Lions football, 1960–1969 =

American college football seasons

The Southeastern Louisiana Lions football program, 1960–1969 represented Southeastern Louisiana College (now known as Southeastern Louisiana University) as a member of the Gulf States Conference (GSC) during the decade of the 1960s. During this time, the Lions were led by two different head coaches and had an overall record for the decade of 55–38–1. During this decade, the Lions played their home games on campus at Strawberry Stadium in Hammond, Louisiana.

Stan Galloway lead the Lions from 1960 through their 1964 season to an overall record of 34–12–1 and at least a share of two Gulf States Conference championships. Galloway resigned in July 1965 and was replaced by former Lions assistant coach Pat Kenelly. Kenelly led Southeastern through the end of the decade to an overall record of 21–26.

== 1960 ==
1960 Southeastern Louisiana Lions football

GSC co-champion
- Conference: Gulf States Conference
- Record: 9–1 (4–1 GSC)
- Head coach: Stan Galloway (10th season)
- Home stadium: Strawberry Stadium

1960 Gulf States Conference football standings
	Conf.					Overall
Team	W		L		T	W		L		T
No. 5 Southeastern Louisiana +	4	–	1	–	0	9	–	1	–	0
No. 12 Louisiana Tech +	4	–	1	–	0	8	–	2	–	0
McNeese State	3	–	2	–	0	7	–	3	–	0
Southwestern Louisiana	3	–	2	–	0	6	–	4	–	0
Northeast Louisiana State	1	–	4	–	0	3	–	7	–	0
Northwestern State	0	–	5	–	0	3	–	6	–	0
+ – Conference co-champions; Rankings from NAIA poll

The 1960 Southeastern Louisiana Lions football team was an American football team that represented Southeastern Louisiana College (now known as Southeastern Louisiana University) as a member of the Gulf States Conference (GSC) during the 1960 college football season. In their tenth year under head coach Stan Galloway, the team compiled an overall record of 9–1 with a mark of 4–1 in conference play, and finished as GSC co-champion. Southeastern Louisiana played their home games on campus at Strawberry Stadium in Hammond, Louisiana.

Schedule

Date	Opponent	Site	Result	Attendance	Source
September 17	at Southwestern Louisiana	McNaspy Stadium; Lafayette, LA (rivalry)	W 20–10	7,500	
September 24	East Texas State*	Strawberry Stadium; Hammond, LA	W 7–0	6,000	
September 30	Corpus Christi*	Strawberry Stadium; Hammond, LA	W 40–0	4,500	
October 8	Pensacola Navy*	Strawberry Stadium; Hammond, LA	W 9–0	6,000	
October 15	Florence State*	Strawberry Stadium; Hammond, LA	W 32–6	5,000	
October 22	Northeast Louisiana State	Strawberry Stadium; Hammond, LA	W 26–0	3,500	
October 29	at Tampa*	Phillips Field; Tampa, FL	W 28–12	7,000	
November 5	at Louisiana Tech	Tech Stadium; Ruston, LA	L 14–17	8,000	
November 12	McNeese State	Strawberry Stadium; Hammond, LA	W 21–6	5,500	
November 19	at Northwestern State	Demon Stadium; Natchitoches, LA (rivalry)	W 7–0	4,000	
*Non-conference game; Source:

== 1962 ==
1962 Southeastern Louisiana Lions football
- Conference: Gulf States Conference
- Record: 6–3 (3–2 GSC)
- Head coach: Stan Galloway (12th season)
- Home stadium: Strawberry Stadium

1962 Gulf States Conference football standings
	Conf.					Overall
Team	W		L		T	W		L		T
Northwestern State $	4	–	1	–	0	7	–	2	–	1
McNeese State	3	–	2	–	0	6	–	2	–	1
Southeastern Louisiana	3	–	2	–	0	6	–	3	–	0
Louisiana Tech	2	–	3	–	0	4	–	4	–	0
Southwestern Louisiana	2	–	3	–	0	4	–	5	–	1
Northeast Louisiana State	1	–	4	–	0	2	–	6	–	0
$ – Conference champion

The 1962 Southeastern Louisiana Lions football team was an American football team that represented Southeastern Louisiana College (now known as Southeastern Louisiana University) as a member of the Gulf States Conference (GSC) during the 1962 NCAA College Division football season. In their twelfth year under head coach Stan Galloway, the team compiled an overall record of 6–3 with a mark of 3–2 in conference play, and finished tied for second in the GSC. Southeastern Louisiana played their home games on campus at Strawberry Stadium in Hammond, Louisiana.

Schedule

Date	Opponent	Site	Result	Attendance	Source
September 15	Corpus Christi*	Strawberry Stadium; Hammond, LA	W 26–0	6,000	
September 21	at Southwestern Louisiana	McNaspy Stadium; Lafayette, LA (rivalry)	W 21–6	6,200	
September 28	Tampa*	Strawberry Stadium; Hammond, LA	W 27–7	5,000	
October 12	Florence State*	Strawberry Stadium; Hammond, LA	W 25–7	5,500	
October 20	Northeast Louisiana State	Strawberry Stadium; Hammond, LA	W 13–12	7,000	
November 3	at Louisiana Tech	Tech Stadium; Ruston, LA	L 15–27	7,500	
November 10	McNeese State	Strawberry Stadium; Hammond, LA	W 21–15	7,500	
November 17	at Northwestern State	Demon Stadium; Natchitoches, LA (rivalry)	L 6–19	3,000	
November 22	at Chattanooga*	Chamberlain Field; Chattanooga, TN	L 19–21	5,100	
*Non-conference game; Source:

== 1963 ==
1963 Southeastern Louisiana Lions football
- Conference: Gulf States Conference
- Record: 4–4–1 (3–2 GSC)
- Head coach: Stan Galloway (13th season)
- Home stadium: Strawberry Stadium

1963 Gulf States Conference football standings
	Conf.					Overall
Team	W		L		T	W		L		T
McNeese State $	5	–	0	–	0	8	–	0	–	0
Louisiana Tech	3	–	2	–	0	6	–	3	–	0
Southeastern Louisiana	3	–	2	–	0	4	–	4	–	1
Northwestern State	2	–	3	–	0	4	–	6	–	0
Southwestern Louisiana	1	–	4	–	0	4	–	5	–	0
Northeast Louisiana State	1	–	4	–	0	4	–	6	–	0
$ – Conference champion

The 1963 Southeastern Louisiana Lions football team was an American football team that represented Southeastern Louisiana College (now known as Southeastern Louisiana University) as a member of the Gulf States Conference (GSC) during the 1963 NCAA College Division football season. In their 13th year under head coach Stan Galloway, the team compiled an overall record of 4–1–1 with a mark of 3–2 in conference play, and finished tied for second in the GSC. Southeastern Louisiana played their home games on campus at Strawberry Stadium in Hammond, Louisiana.

Schedule

Date	Opponent	Site	Result	Attendance	Source
September 20	Southwestern Louisiana	Strawberry Stadium; Hammond, LA (rivalry)	W 14–0	8,500	
September 28	at Howard (AL)*	Seibert Stadium; Homewood, AL	L 0–7	7,000	
October 4	East Texas State*	Strawberry Stadium; Hammond, LA	T 13–13	6,500	
October 12	Arlington State*	Strawberry Stadium; Hammond, LA	L 13–14	5,500	
October 18	Corpus Christi*	Strawberry Stadium; Hammond, LA	W 36–0	5,500	
October 26	at Northeast Louisiana State	Brown Stadium; Monroe, LA	W 12–7	6,000	
November 9	Louisiana Tech	Strawberry Stadium; Hammond, LA	W 15–7	7,000	
November 16	at No. 9 McNeese State	Wildcat Stadium; Lake Charles, LA	L 6–35	8,000	
November 23	Northwestern State	Strawberry Stadium; Hammond, LA (rivalry)	L 7–13	5,000	
*Non-conference game; Rankings from UPI Poll released prior to the game; Source:

== 1964 ==
1964 Southeastern Louisiana Lions football
- Conference: Gulf States Conference
- Record: 6–3 (4–1 GSC)
- Head coach: Stan Galloway (14th season)
- Home stadium: Strawberry Stadium

1964 Gulf States Conference football standings
	Conf.					Overall
Team	W		L		T	W		L		T
Louisiana Tech $	5	–	0	–	0	9	–	1	–	0
Southeastern Louisiana	4	–	1	–	0	6	–	3	–	0
McNeese State	3	–	2	–	0	6	–	3	–	0
Southwestern Louisiana	2	–	3	–	0	5	–	4	–	0
Northwestern State	1	–	4	–	0	4	–	5	–	0
Northeast Louisiana State	0	–	5	–	0	0	–	8	–	0
$ – Conference champion

The 1964 Southeastern Louisiana Lions football team was an American football team that represented Southeastern Louisiana College (now known as Southeastern Louisiana University) as a member of the Gulf States Conference (GSC) during the 1964 NCAA College Division football season. In their 13th year under head coach Stan Galloway, the team compiled an overall record of 6–3 with a mark of 4–1 in conference play, and finished second in the GSC. Southeastern Louisiana played their home games on campus at Strawberry Stadium in Hammond, Louisiana.

Schedule

Date	Opponent	Site	Result	Attendance	Source
September 26	at East Texas State*	Memorial Stadium; Commerce, TX	L 8–22		
October 9	Louisiana College*	Strawberry Stadium; Hammond, LA	W 35–7		
October 24	Northeast Louisiana State	Strawberry Stadium; Hammond, LA	W 20–10	6,400	
November 7	at No. 4 Louisiana Tech	Tech Stadium; Ruston, LA	L 7–28	8,500	
November 14	McNeese State	Strawberry Stadium; Hammond, LA	W 7–2	7,000	
November 21	at Northwestern State	Demon Stadium; Natchitoches, LA (rivalry)	W 37–21		
November 26	at Chattanooga*	Chamberlain Field; Chattanooga, TN	L 0–21		
December 4	Frederick*	Strawberry Stadium; Hammond, LA	W 26–0	3,000	
December 12	at Southwestern Louisiana	McNaspy Stadium; Lafayette, LA (rivalry)	W 12–7	8,500	
*Non-conference game; Rankings from UPI Poll released prior to the game; Source:

== 1965 ==
1965 Southeastern Louisiana Lions football
- Conference: Gulf States Conference
- Record: 5–4 (2–3 GSC)
- Head coach: Pat Kenelly (1st season)
- Home stadium: Strawberry Stadium

1965 Gulf States Conference football standings
	Conf.					Overall
Team	W		L		T	W		L		T
Southwestern Louisiana +	4	–	1	–	0	6	–	3	–	0
McNeese State +	4	–	1	–	0	5	–	4	–	0
Louisiana Tech	3	–	2	–	0	4	–	4	–	0
Northwestern State	2	–	3	–	0	5	–	3	–	0
Southeastern Louisiana	2	–	3	–	0	5	–	4	–	0
Northeast Louisiana State	0	–	5	–	0	1	–	8	–	0
+ – Conference co-champions

The 1965 Southeastern Louisiana Lions football team was an American football team that represented Southeastern Louisiana College (now known as Southeastern Louisiana University) as a member of the Gulf States Conference (GSC) during the 1965 NCAA College Division football season. In their first year under head coach Pat Kenelly, the team compiled an overall record of 5–4 with a mark of 2–3 in conference play, and finished tied for fourth in the GSC. Southeastern Louisiana played their home games on campus at Strawberry Stadium in Hammond, Louisiana.

In July 1965, Galloway resigned as head coach of the Lions. On July 23, former assistant coach Pat Kenelly was named as the new head coach at Southeastern.

Schedule

Date	Opponent	Site	Result	Attendance	Source
September 18	at Southern Miss*	Faulkner Field; Hattiesburg, MS	L 0–15	11,000	
October 2	Southwestern Louisiana	Strawberry Stadium; Hammond, LA (rivalry)	W 13–0	8,500	
October 9	Howard (AL)*	Strawberry Stadium; Hammond, LA	W 13–7	6,500	
October 16	at Louisiana College*	Alumni Stadium; Pineville, LA	W 23–7	4,500	
October 23	at Northeast Louisiana State	Brown Stadium; Monroe, LA	W 14–6	6,300	
November 6	Louisiana Tech	Strawberry Stadium; Hammond, LA	L 14–16	10,000	
November 13	at McNeese State	Cowboy Stadium; Lake Charles, LA	L 8–12	10,000	
November 20	Northwestern State	Strawberry Stadium; Hammond, LA (rivalry)	L 22–38	5,000	
November 25	Appalachian State*	Strawberry Stadium; Hammond, LA	W 54–6	2,500	
*Non-conference game; Source:

== 1966 ==
1966 Southeastern Louisiana Lions football
- Conference: Gulf States Conference
- Record: 3–6 (1–4 GSC)
- Head coach: Pat Kenelly (2nd season)
- Home stadium: Strawberry Stadium

1966 Gulf States Conference football standings
	Conf.					Overall
Team	W		L		T	W		L		T
No. 4 Northwestern State $	5	–	0	–	0	9	–	0	–	0
Southwestern Louisiana	3	–	2	–	0	6	–	4	–	0
McNeese State	3	–	2	–	0	5	–	5	–	0
Northeast Louisiana State	2	–	3	–	0	7	–	3	–	0
Southeastern Louisiana	1	–	4	–	0	3	–	6	–	0
Louisiana Tech	1	–	4	–	0	1	–	9	–	0
$ – Conference champion; Rankings from NAIA poll

The 1966 Southeastern Louisiana Lions football team was an American football team that represented Southeastern Louisiana College (now known as Southeastern Louisiana University) as a member of the Gulf States Conference (GSC) during the 1966 NCAA College Division football season. In their second year under head coach Pat Kenelly, the team compiled an overall record of 3–6 with a mark of 1–4 in conference play, and finished tied for fifth in the GSC. Southeastern Louisiana played their home games on campus at Strawberry Stadium in Hammond, Louisiana.

Schedule

Date	Opponent	Site	Result	Attendance	Source
September 24	Southern Miss*	Strawberry Stadium; Hammond, LA	L 13–15	8,000	
October 1	at Southwestern Louisiana	McNaspy Stadium; Lafayette, LA (rivalry)	L 6–35	10,000	
October 8	at Trinity (TX)*	Alamo Stadium; San Antonio, TX	L 7–14	1,601	
October 15	Louisiana College*	Strawberry Stadium; Hammond, LA	W 49–0	5,000	
October 22	Northeast Louisiana State	Strawberry Stadium; Hammond, LA	W 14–13	4,500	
October 29	at Pensacola Navy*	Kane Stadium; Pensacola, FL	W 52–33		
November 5	at Louisiana Tech	Tech Stadium; Ruston, LA	L 6–13	10,000	
November 12	McNeese State	Strawberry Stadium; Hammond, LA	L 12–28	7,500	
November 19	at No. 4 Northwestern State	Demon Stadium; Natchitoches, LA (rivalry)	L 24–27	7,500	
*Non-conference game; Rankings from UPI Poll released prior to the game; Source:

== 1967 ==
1967 Southeastern Louisiana Lions football
- Conference: Gulf States Conference
- Record: 4–5 (2–3 GSC)
- Head coach: Pat Kenelly (3rd season)
- Home stadium: Strawberry Stadium

1967 Gulf States Conference football standings
	Conf.					Overall
Team	W		L		T	W		L		T
McNeese State $	4	–	1	–	0	4	–	5	–	0
Southwestern Louisiana	3	–	2	–	0	6	–	4	–	0
Northeast Louisiana State	3	–	2	–	0	7	–	3	–	0
Northwestern State	3	–	2	–	0	6	–	3	–	0
Southeastern Louisiana	2	–	3	–	0	4	–	5	–	0
Louisiana Tech	0	–	5	–	0	3	–	7	–	0
$ – Conference champion

The 1967 Southeastern Louisiana Lions football team was an American football team that represented Southeastern Louisiana College (now known as Southeastern Louisiana University) as a member of the Gulf States Conference (GSC) during the 1967 NCAA College Division football season. In their third year under head coach Pat Kenelly, the team compiled an overall record of 4–5 with a mark of 2–3 in conference play, and finished fifth in the GSC. Southeastern Louisiana played their home games on campus at Strawberry Stadium in Hammond, Louisiana.

Schedule

Date	Opponent	Site	Result	Attendance	Source
September 23	at Southern Miss*	Faulkner Field; Hattiesburg, MS	L 7–20	14,000	
September 30	at Lamar Tech*	Cardinal Stadium; Beaumont, TX	L 21–34	11,712	
October 7	Trinity (TX)*	Strawberry Stadium; Hammond, LA	W 31–0	5,000	
October 14	Southwestern Louisiana	Strawberry Stadium; Hammond, LA (rivalry)	L 0–9	8,000	
October 21	at Northeast Louisiana State	Brown Stadium; Monroe, LA	L 14–30	8,300	
October 28	Pensacola Navy*	Strawberry Stadium; Hammond, LA	W 37–16	5,300	
November 4	Louisiana Tech	Strawberry Stadium; Hammond, LA	W 27–21	7,800	
November 11	at McNeese State	Cowboy Stadium; Lake Charles, LA	L 8–23	11,000	
November 18	Northwestern State	Strawberry Stadium; Hammond, LA (rivalry)	W 26–14	5,500	
*Non-conference game; Source:

== 1968 ==
1968 Southeastern Louisiana Lions football
- Conference: Gulf States Conference
- Record: 4–6 (2–3 GSC)
- Head coach: Pat Kenelly (4th season)
- Home stadium: Strawberry Stadium

1968 Gulf States Conference football standings
	Conf.					Overall
Team	W		L		T	W		L		T
No. 8/10 Southwestern Louisiana $	4	–	1	–	0	8	–	2	–	0
Louisiana Tech	3	–	2	–	0	9	–	2	–	0
Northeast Louisiana State	3	–	2	–	0	6	–	4	–	0
Northwestern State	2	–	3	–	0	5	–	4	–	0
Southeastern Louisiana	2	–	3	–	0	4	–	6	–	0
McNeese State	1	–	4	–	0	4	–	6	–	0
$ – Conference champion; Rankings from NAIA poll and AP small college poll

The 1968 Southeastern Louisiana Lions football team was an American football team that represented Southeastern Louisiana College (now known as Southeastern Louisiana University) as a member of the Gulf States Conference (GSC) during the 1968 NCAA College Division football season. In their fourth year under head coach Pat Kenelly, the team compiled an overall record of 4–6 with a mark of 2–3 in conference play, and finished tied for fourth in the GSC. Southeastern Louisiana played their home games on campus at Strawberry Stadium in Hammond, Louisiana.

Schedule

Date	Opponent	Site	Result	Attendance	Source
September 14	Howard Payne*	Strawberry Stadium; Hammond, LA	W 28–7	6,500	
September 21	Southern Miss*	Strawberry Stadium; Hammond, LA	L 15–27	7,000	
October 5	at Southwestern Louisiana	McNaspy Stadium; Lafayette, LA (rivalry)	L 6–31	12,000	
October 12	at No. 11 Arkansas State*	Kays Stadium; Jonesboro, AR	L 7–17	8,112	
October 19	at Pensacola Navy*	Kane Stadium; Pensacola, FL	L 16–30	5,000	
October 26	Northeast Louisiana State	Strawberry Stadium; Hammond, LA	L 0–13	7,800	
November 2	at Trinity (TX)*	Alamo Stadium; San Antonio, TX	W 7–3	3,179	
November 9	at Louisiana Tech	Louisiana Tech Stadium; Ruston, LA	L 7–35	10,000	
November 16	McNeese State	Strawberry Stadium; Hammond, LA	W 17–3	5,000	
November 23	at Northwestern State	Demon Stadium; Natchitoches, LA (rivalry)	W 24–19	7,000	
*Non-conference game; Rankings from UPI Poll released prior to the game; Source:

== 1969 ==
1969 Southeastern Louisiana Lions football
- Conference: Gulf States Conference
- Record: 5–5 (2–3 GSC)
- Head coach: Pat Kenelly (5th season)
- Home stadium: Strawberry Stadium

1969 Gulf States Conference football standings
	Conf.					Overall
Team	W		L		T	W		L		T
Louisiana Tech $	5	–	0	–	0	8	–	2	–	0
Northwestern State	4	–	1	–	0	7	–	2	–	0
Southwestern Louisiana	3	–	2	–	0	5	–	5	–	0
Southeastern Louisiana	2	–	3	–	0	5	–	5	–	0
McNeese State	1	–	4	–	0	4	–	6	–	0
Northeast Louisiana	0	–	5	–	0	1	–	9	–	0
$ – Conference champion

The 1969 Southeastern Louisiana Lions football team was an American football team that represented Southeastern Louisiana College (now known as Southeastern Louisiana University) as a member of the Gulf States Conference (GSC) during the 1969 NCAA College Division football season. In their fifth year under head coach Pat Kenelly, the team compiled an overall record of 5–5 with a mark of 2–3 in conference play, and finished fourth in the GSC. Southeastern Louisiana played their home games on campus at Strawberry Stadium in Hammond, Louisiana.

Schedule

Date	Opponent	Site	Result	Attendance	Source
September 20	at Southern Miss*	Faulkner Field; Hattiesburg, MS	L 6–14	12,200	
September 27	Lamar Tech*	Strawberry Stadium; Hammond, LA	W 21–19	6,500	
October 4	Southwestern Louisiana	Strawberry Stadium; Hammond, LA (rivalry)	L 3–9	7,700	
October 11	Trinity (TX)*	Strawberry Stadium; Hammond, LA	W 43–14	6,000–6,500	
October 18	Pensacola Navy*	Strawberry Stadium; Hammond, LA	W 20–7	5,600	
October 25	at Northeast Louisiana	Brown Stadium; Monroe, LA	W 20–10	3,500	
November 1	at Youngstown State*	Rayen Stadium; Youngstown, OH	L 7–20	2,500	
November 8	No. 8 Louisiana Tech	Strawberry Stadium; Hammond, LA	L 24–25	8,000	
November 15	at McNeese State	Cowboy Stadium; Lake Charles, LA	W 24–21	9,000	
November 22	Northwestern State	Strawberry Stadium; Hammond, LA (rivalry)	L 6–34	5,000	
*Non-conference game; Rankings from UPI Poll released prior to the game; Source:
