= 1966 Southwestern Louisiana Bulldogs football team =

American college football season

1966 Southwestern Louisiana Bulldogs football
- Conference: Gulf States Conference
- Record: 6–4 (3–2 GSC)
- Head coach: Russ Faulkinberry (6th season)
- Home stadium: McNaspy Stadium

1966 Gulf States Conference football standings
	Conf.					Overall
Team	W		L		T	W		L		T
No. 4 Northwestern State $	5	–	0	–	0	9	–	0	–	0
Southwestern Louisiana	3	–	2	–	0	6	–	4	–	0
McNeese State	3	–	2	–	0	5	–	5	–	0
Northeast Louisiana State	2	–	3	–	0	7	–	3	–	0
Southeastern Louisiana	1	–	4	–	0	3	–	6	–	0
Louisiana Tech	1	–	4	–	0	1	–	9	–	0
$ – Conference champion; Rankings from NAIA poll

The 1966 Southwestern Louisiana Bulldogs football team was an American football team that represented the University of Southwestern Louisiana (now known as the University of Louisiana at Lafayette) in the Gulf States Conference during the 1966 NCAA College Division football season. In their sixth year under head coach Russ Faulkinberry, the team compiled a 6–4 record.

== Schedule ==
Date	Opponent	Site	Result	Attendance	Source
September 17	at Louisiana College*	Alumni Stadium; Pineville, LA	W 24–0	4,000	
September 24	at Delta State*	Delta Field; Cleveland, MS	L 3–28	4,000	
October 1	Southeastern Louisiana	McNaspy Stadium; Lafayette, LA (rivalry)	W 35–6	10,000	
October 8	Lamar Tech*	McNaspy Stadium; Lafayette, LA (rivalry)	W 14–16	10,200	
October 15	Louisiana Tech	McNaspy Stadium; Lafayette, LA (rivalry)	W 21–12	15,000	
October 22	Samford*	McNaspy Stadium; Lafayette, LA	W 6–3	9,500	
October 29	at Northeast Louisiana State	Brown Stadium; Monroe, LA (rivalry)	L 7–10	6,000	
November 5	Arkansas State*	McNaspy Stadium; Lafayette, LA	L 14–17	9,000	
November 12	at No. 5 Northwestern State	Demon Stadium; Natchitoches, LA	L 8–21	10,200	
November 19	at McNeese State	Cowboy Stadium; Lake Charles, LA (rivalry)	W 7–0	12,300	
*Non-conference game; Rankings from AP Poll released prior to the game
