= 1967 Northeast Louisiana State Indians football team =

American college football season

1967 Northeast Louisiana State Indians football
- Conference: Gulf States Conference
- Record: 7–3 (3–2 GSC)
- Head coach: Dixie B. White (4th season)
- Home stadium: Brown Stadium

1967 Gulf States Conference football standings
	Conf.					Overall
Team	W		L		T	W		L		T
McNeese State $	4	–	1	–	0	4	–	5	–	0
Southwestern Louisiana	3	–	2	–	0	6	–	4	–	0
Northeast Louisiana State	3	–	2	–	0	7	–	3	–	0
Northwestern State	3	–	2	–	0	6	–	3	–	0
Southeastern Louisiana	2	–	3	–	0	4	–	5	–	0
Louisiana Tech	0	–	5	–	0	3	–	7	–	0
$ – Conference champion

The 1967 Northeast Louisiana State Indians football team was an American football team that represented Northeast Louisiana State College (now known as the University of Louisiana at Monroe) in the Gulf States Conference during the 1967 NCAA College Division football season. In their fourth year under head coach Dixie B. White, the team compiled a 7–3 record.

== Schedule ==
Date	Opponent	Site	Result	Attendance	Source
September 16	Henderson State*	Brown Stadium; Monroe, LA	W 33–0	7,000	
September 23	at Stephen F. Austin*	Memorial Stadium; Nacogdoches, TX	W 10–0	10,019	
September 30	at Northwestern State	Demon Stadium; Natchitoches, LA (rivalry)	L 14–21	10,000	
October 7	at Chattanooga*	Chamberlain Field; Chattanooga, TN	L 14–21	9,000	
October 14	McNeese State	Brown Stadium; Monroe, LA	L 7–8	7,500–10,000	
October 21	Southeastern Louisiana	Brown Stadium; Monroe, LA	W 30–14	8,300	
October 28	at Southwestern Louisiana	McNaspy Stadium; Lafayette, LA (rivalry)	W 17–6	15,500	
November 4	Eastern Michigan*	Brown Stadium; Monroe, LA	W 12–10	5,000	
November 11	Delta State*	Brown Stadium; Monroe, LA	W 38–17	7,450	
November 18	at Louisiana Tech	Tech Stadium; Ruston, LA (rivalry)	W 21–14	8,000–9,000	
*Non-conference game
