= 1969 McNeese State Cowboys football team =

American college football season

1969 McNeese State Cowboys football
- Conference: Gulf States Conference
- Record: 4–6 (1–4 GSC)
- Head coach: Jim Clark (4th season)
- Home stadium: Cowboy Stadium

1969 Gulf States Conference football standings
	Conf.					Overall
Team	W		L		T	W		L		T
Louisiana Tech $	5	–	0	–	0	8	–	2	–	0
Northwestern State	4	–	1	–	0	7	–	2	–	0
Southwestern Louisiana	3	–	2	–	0	5	–	5	–	0
Southeastern Louisiana	2	–	3	–	0	5	–	5	–	0
McNeese State	1	–	4	–	0	4	–	6	–	0
Northeast Louisiana	0	–	5	–	0	1	–	9	–	0
$ – Conference champion

The 1969 McNeese State Cowboys football team represented McNeese State University as a member of the Gulf States Conference (GSC) during the 1969 NCAA College Division football season. Led by Jim Clark in his fourth and final season as head coach, the Cowboys compiled an overall record of 4–6 with a mark of 1–4 in conference play, placing fifth in the GSC. McNeese State played home games at Cowboy Stadium on Lake Charles, Louisiana.

== Schedule ==
Date	Opponent	Site	Result	Attendance	Source
September 20	Lamar Tech*	Cowboy Stadium; Lake Charles, LA (Battle of the Border)	L 7–13	12,300–12,600	
September 27	at Tennessee–Martin*	Graham Stadium; Martin, TN	W 17–15	6,000	
October 4	Louisiana Tech	Cowboy Stadium; Lake Charles, LA	L 18–35	12,300	
October 11	UT Arlington*	Cowboy Stadium; Lake Charles, LA	L 7–13	9,000	
October 18	at Northeast Louisiana	Brown Stadium; Monroe, LA	W 41–27	8,000	
October 25	at NAS Pensacola*	Kane Field; Pensacola, FL	W 31–29	3,500	
November 1	No. 13 Troy State*	Cowboy Stadium; Lake Charles, LA	W 17–14	10,000	
November 8	at Northwestern State	Demon Stadium; Natchitoches, LA (rivalry)	L 28–29	9,000	
November 15	Southeastern Louisiana	Cowboy Stadium; Lake Charles, LA	L 21–24	9,000	
November 22	at Southwestern Louisiana	McNaspy Stadium; Lafayette, LA (Cajun Crown)	L 17–21	10,000–12,000	
*Non-conference game; Rankings from AP Poll released prior to the game
