= 1963 Northeast Louisiana State Indians football team =

American college football season

1963 Northeast Louisiana State Indians football
- Conference: Gulf States Conference
- Record: 4–6 (1–4 GSC)
- Head coach: Jack C. Rowan (6th season)
- Home stadium: Brown Stadium

1963 Gulf States Conference football standings
	Conf.					Overall
Team	W		L		T	W		L		T
McNeese State $	5	–	0	–	0	8	–	0	–	0
Louisiana Tech	3	–	2	–	0	6	–	3	–	0
Southeastern Louisiana	3	–	2	–	0	4	–	4	–	1
Northwestern State	2	–	3	–	0	4	–	6	–	0
Southwestern Louisiana	1	–	4	–	0	4	–	5	–	0
Northeast Louisiana State	1	–	4	–	0	4	–	6	–	0
$ – Conference champion

The 1963 Northeast Louisiana State Indians football team was an American football team that represented Northeast Louisiana State College (now known as the University of Louisiana at Monroe) in the Gulf States Conference during the 1963 NCAA College Division football season. In their sixth year under head coach Jack C. Rowan, the team compiled a 4–6 record.

== Schedule ==
Date	Opponent	Site	Result	Attendance	Source
September 21	at Chattanooga*	Chamberlain Field; Chattanooga, TN	L 0–9	6,000	
September 28	McMurry*	Brown Stadium; Monroe, LA	W 8–7		
October 5	at Northwestern State	Demon Stadium; Natchitoches, LA (rivalry)	L 19–27		
October 12	Howard (AL)*	Brown Stadium; Monroe, LA	L 7–13	3,600	
October 19	No. 10 McNeese State	Brown Stadium; Monroe, LA	L 8–20	4,500	
October 26	Southeastern Louisiana	Brown Stadium; Monroe, LA	L 7–12		
November 2	at Arlington State*	Memorial Stadium; Arlington, TX	W 21–12	6,500	
November 9	Southwestern Louisiana	Brown Stadium; Monroe, LA (rivalry)	W 7–6	4,000	
November 16	Delta State*	Brown Stadium; Monroe, LA	W 29–7		
November 23	at Louisiana Tech	Tech Stadium; Ruston, LA (rivalry)	L 7–28	8,000	
*Non-conference game; Rankings from AP Poll released prior to the game
