= 1968 Louisiana Tech Bulldogs football team =

American college football season

1968 Louisiana Tech Bulldogs football

NCAA College Division Mideast Region champion Grantland Rice Bowl champion

Grantland Rice Bowl, W 33–13 vs. Akron
- Conference: Gulf States Conference
- Record: 9–2 (3–2 GSC)
- Head coach: Maxie Lambright (2nd season)
- Captains: Jesse Carrigan; Walter Causey
- Home stadium: Louisiana Tech Stadium

1968 Gulf States Conference football standings
	Conf.					Overall
Team	W		L		T	W		L		T
No. 8/10 Southwestern Louisiana $	4	–	1	–	0	8	–	2	–	0
Louisiana Tech	3	–	2	–	0	9	–	2	–	0
Northeast Louisiana State	3	–	2	–	0	6	–	4	–	0
Northwestern State	2	–	3	–	0	5	–	4	–	0
Southeastern Louisiana	2	–	3	–	0	4	–	6	–	0
McNeese State	1	–	4	–	0	4	–	6	–	0
$ – Conference champion; Rankings from NAIA poll and AP small college poll

The 1968 Louisiana Tech Bulldogs football team was an American football team that represented the Louisiana Polytechnic Institute (now known as Louisiana Tech University) as a member of the Gulf States Conference during the 1968 NCAA College Division football season. In their second year under head coach Maxie Lambright, the team compiled a 9–2 record.

== Schedule ==
Date	Opponent	Rank	Site	Result	Attendance	Source
September 21	at Mississippi State*		Scott Field; Starkville, MS	W 20–13	15,000	
September 28	East Carolina*	No. 15	Louisiana Tech Stadium; Ruston, LA	W 35–7	12,000	
October 5	McNeese State	No. 11	Louisiana Tech Stadium; Ruston, LA	L 20–27	14,000	
October 12	at Southwestern Louisiana	No. 12	McNaspy Stadium; Lafayette, LA (rivalry)	L 24–28	13,000	
October 19	vs. Northwestern State		State Fair Stadium; Shreveport, LA (rivalry)	W 42–39	28,000	
November 2	at Southern Miss*		Faulkner Field; Hattiesburg, MS (rivalry)	W 27–20	15,000	
November 9	Southeastern Louisiana		Louisiana Tech Stadium; Ruston, LA	W 35–7	10,000	
November 16	at Lamar Tech*		Cardinal Stadium; Beaumont, TX	W 34–7	10,400	
November 23	at Northeast Louisiana State		Brown Stadium; Monroe, LA (rivalry)	W 25–10	12,000	
November 28	New Mexico State*		Louisiana Tech Stadium; Ruston, LA	W 42–24	5,000	
December 14	vs. No. 17 Akron*		Horace Jones Field; Murfreesboro, TN (Grantland Rice Bowl)	W 33–13	2,500	
*Non-conference game; Rankings from AP Poll released prior to the game
