= 1965 McNeese State Cowboys football team =

American college football season

1965 McNeese State Cowboys football

GSC co-champion
- Conference: Gulf States Conference
- Record: 5–4 (4–1 GSC)
- Head coach: Les DeVall (9th season)
- Home stadium: Cowboy Stadium

1965 Gulf States Conference football standings
	Conf.					Overall
Team	W		L		T	W		L		T
Southwestern Louisiana +	4	–	1	–	0	6	–	3	–	0
McNeese State +	4	–	1	–	0	5	–	4	–	0
Louisiana Tech	3	–	2	–	0	4	–	4	–	0
Northwestern State	2	–	3	–	0	5	–	3	–	0
Southeastern Louisiana	2	–	3	–	0	5	–	4	–	0
Northeast Louisiana State	0	–	5	–	0	1	–	8	–	0
+ – Conference co-champions

The 1965 McNeese State Cowboys football team was an American football team that represented McNeese State College (now known as McNeese State University) as a member of the Gulf States Conference (GSC) during the 1965 NCAA College Division football season. In their ninth year under head coach Les DeVall, the team compiled an overall record of 5–4 with a mark of 4–1 in conference play, and finished as GSC co-champion.

== Schedule ==
Date	Opponent	Site	Result	Attendance	Source
September 18	Tampa*	Cowboy Stadium; Lake Charles, LA	L 12–16	11,000	
September 25	at Pensacola NAS*	Kane Field; Penscaola, FL	L 13–24	3,500	
October 2	No. 7 Louisiana Tech	Cowboy Stadium; Lake Charles, LA	W 20–14	10,200	
October 16	at Northeast Louisiana State	Brown Stadium; Monroe, LA	W 14–6	3,500	
October 23	Memphis State*	Cowboy Stadium; Lake Charles, LA	L 0–28	12,000	
October 30	at Louisiana College*	Alumni Stadium; Pineville, LA	W 10–0	5,000	
November 6	at Northwestern State	Demon Stadium; Natchitoches, LA (rivalry)	W 29–21	5,000	
November 13	Southeastern Louisiana	Cowboy Stadium; Lake Charles, LA	W 12–8	10,000	
November 20	at Southwestern Louisiana	McNaspy Stadium; Lafayette, LA (rivalry)	L 7–14	12,000	
*Non-conference game; Rankings from AP Poll released prior to the game
