= 1968 Southwestern Louisiana Bulldogs football team =

American college football season

1968 Southwestern Louisiana Bulldogs football

GSC champion
- Conference: Gulf States Conference
- Record: 8–2 (5–1 GSC)
- Head coach: Russ Faulkinberry (8th season)
- Home stadium: McNaspy Stadium

1968 Gulf States Conference football standings
	Conf.					Overall
Team	W		L		T	W		L		T
No. 8/10 Southwestern Louisiana $	4	–	1	–	0	8	–	2	–	0
Louisiana Tech	3	–	2	–	0	9	–	2	–	0
Northeast Louisiana State	3	–	2	–	0	6	–	4	–	0
Northwestern State	2	–	3	–	0	5	–	4	–	0
Southeastern Louisiana	2	–	3	–	0	4	–	6	–	0
McNeese State	1	–	4	–	0	4	–	6	–	0
$ – Conference champion; Rankings from NAIA poll and AP small college poll

The 1968 Southwestern Louisiana Bulldogs football team was an American football team that represented the University of Southwestern Louisiana (now known as the University of Louisiana at Lafayette) in the Gulf States Conference during the 1968 NCAA College Division football season. In their eighth year under head coach Russ Faulkinberry, the team compiled an 8–2 record and were Gulf States Conference champions.

== Schedule ==
Date	Opponent	Site	Result	Attendance	Source
September 21	at Louisiana College*	Alumni Stadium; Pineville, LA	W 28–0		
September 28	at Pensacola NAS*	Kane Field; Pensacola, FL	L 35–39		
October 5	Southeastern Louisiana	McNaspy Stadium; Lafayette, LA (rivalry)	W 31–6	12,000	
October 12	No. 12 Louisiana Tech	McNaspy Stadium; Lafayette, LA (rivalry)	W 28–24	13,000	
October 19	Delta State*	McNaspy Stadium; Lafayette, LA	W 32–27		
October 26	Lamar Tech*	McNaspy Stadium; Lafayette, LA (rivalry)	W 20–14	15,000	
November 2	at Northeast Louisiana State	Brown Stadium; Monroe, LA (rivalry)	L 7–20	8,500	
November 9	No. 10 Arkansas State*	McNaspy Stadium; Lafayette, LA	W 20–9	11,600	
November 16	at Northwestern State	Demon Stadium; Natchitoches, LA	W 14–7	11,000	
November 23	at McNeese State	Cowboy Stadium; Lake Charles, LA (rivalry)	W 12–7	12,300	
*Non-conference game; Rankings from AP Poll released prior to the game
