= 1964 Southwestern Louisiana Bulldogs football team =

American college football season

1964 Southwestern Louisiana Bulldogs football
- Conference: Gulf States Conference
- Record: 5–4 (2–3 GSC)
- Head coach: Russ Faulkinberry (4th season)
- Home stadium: McNaspy Stadium

1964 Gulf States Conference football standings
	Conf.					Overall
Team	W		L		T	W		L		T
Louisiana Tech $	5	–	0	–	0	9	–	1	–	0
Southeastern Louisiana	4	–	1	–	0	6	–	3	–	0
McNeese State	3	–	2	–	0	6	–	3	–	0
Southwestern Louisiana	2	–	3	–	0	5	–	4	–	0
Northwestern State	1	–	4	–	0	4	–	5	–	0
Northeast Louisiana State	0	–	5	–	0	0	–	8	–	0
$ – Conference champion

The 1964 Southwestern Louisiana Bulldogs football team was an American football team that represented the University of Southwestern Louisiana (now known as the University of Louisiana at Lafayette) in the Gulf States Conference during the 1964 NCAA College Division football season. In their fourth year under head coach Russ Faulkinberry, the team compiled a 5–4 record.

== Schedule ==
Date	Opponent	Site	Result	Attendance	Source
September 24	at Southern Miss*	Faulkner Field; Hattiesburg, MS	L 0–30	10,000	
October 10	Louisiana Tech	McNaspy Stadium; Lafayette, LA (rivalry)	L 3–6	8,500	
October 17	Tampa*^{†}	McNaspy Stadium; Lafayette, LA	W 37–6	10,500	
October 24	at Louisiana College*	Alumni Stadium; Pineville, LA	W 14–7	6,000	
October 30	Lenoir–Rhyne*	McNaspy Stadium; Lafayette, LA	W 20–6	7,500	
November 7	Northeast Louisiana State	McNaspy Stadium; Lafayette, LA (rivalry)	W 23–7	7,000–10,000	
November 14	at Northwestern State	Demon Stadium; Natchitoches, LA	W 27–17	6,500	
November 21	at McNeese State	Wildcat Stadium; Lake Charles, LA (rivalry)	L 9–24	7,500	
December 12	Southeastern Louisiana	McNaspy Stadium; Lafayette, LA (rivalry)	L 7–12	8,500	
*Non-conference game; ^{†}Homecoming
