= 1963 Louisiana Tech Bulldogs football team =

American college football season

1963 Louisiana Tech Bulldogs football
- Conference: Gulf States Conference
- Record: 6–3 (3–2 GSC)
- Head coach: Joe Aillet (23rd season)
- Captains: Charles Bourgeois; Paul Labenne; J. R. Williamson
- Home stadium: Tech Stadium

1963 Gulf States Conference football standings
	Conf.					Overall
Team	W		L		T	W		L		T
McNeese State $	5	–	0	–	0	8	–	0	–	0
Louisiana Tech	3	–	2	–	0	6	–	3	–	0
Southeastern Louisiana	3	–	2	–	0	4	–	4	–	1
Northwestern State	2	–	3	–	0	4	–	6	–	0
Southwestern Louisiana	1	–	4	–	0	4	–	5	–	0
Northeast Louisiana State	1	–	4	–	0	4	–	6	–	0
$ – Conference champion

The 1963 Louisiana Tech Bulldogs football team was an American football team that represented the Louisiana Polytechnic Institute (now known as Louisiana Tech University) as a member of the Gulf States Conference during the 1963 NCAA College Division football season. In their twenty-third year under head coach Joe Aillet, the team compiled a 6–3 record.

== Schedule ==
Date	Opponent	Site	Result	Attendance	Source
September 28	at McNeese State	Wildcat Stadium; Lake Charles, LA	L 6–27	7,000	
October 5	Louisiana College*	Tech Stadium; Ruston, LA	W 12–6	7,500	
October 12	Southwestern Louisiana	Tech Stadium; Ruston, LA (rivalry)	W 45–0	8,500	
October 19	vs. Northwestern State	State Fair Stadium; Shreveport, LA (rivalry)	W 27–13	18,500	
October 26	at Arlington State*	Memorial Stadium; Arlington, TX	W 34–14	7,000	
November 2	at Tennessee Tech*	Overall Field; Cookeville, TN	L 19–21	7,500	
November 9	at Southeastern Louisiana	Strawberry Stadium; Hammond, LA	L 7–15	7,000	
November 16	Southern Miss*	Tech Stadium; Ruston, LA (rivalry)	W 10–0	7,000	
November 23	Northeast Louisiana State	Tech Stadium; Ruston, LA (rivalry)	W 28–7	8,000	
*Non-conference game
