= 1969 Louisiana Tech Bulldogs football team =

American college football season

1969 Louisiana Tech Bulldogs football

GSC champion

Grantland Rice Bowl, L 14–34 vs. East Tennessee State
- Conference: Gulf States Conference
- Record: 8–2 (5–0 GSC)
- Head coach: Maxie Lambright (3rd season)
- Captains: Terry Bradshaw; John Harper; Tommy Spinks
- Home stadium: Louisiana Tech Stadium

1969 Gulf States Conference football standings
	Conf.					Overall
Team	W		L		T	W		L		T
Louisiana Tech $	5	–	0	–	0	8	–	2	–	0
Northwestern State	4	–	1	–	0	7	–	2	–	0
Southwestern Louisiana	3	–	2	–	0	5	–	5	–	0
Southeastern Louisiana	2	–	3	–	0	5	–	5	–	0
McNeese State	1	–	4	–	0	4	–	6	–	0
Northeast Louisiana	0	–	5	–	0	1	–	9	–	0
$ – Conference champion

The 1969 Louisiana Tech Bulldogs football team was an American football team that represented the Louisiana Polytechnic Institute (now Louisiana Tech University) as a member of the Gulf States Conference (GSC) during the 1969 NCAA College Division football season. In their third year under head coach Maxie Lambright, the Bulldogs compiled an 8–1 record in the regular season, were GSC champions (5–0), but lost to East Tennessee State in the Grantland Rice Bowl to finish at 8–2.

== Schedule ==
Date	Opponent	Rank	Site	Result	Attendance	Source
September 27	at East Carolina*		Ficklen Memorial Stadium; Greenville, NC	W 24–6	13,500	
October 4	at McNeese State		Cowboy Stadium; Lake Charles, LA	W 35–18	12,300	
October 11	Southwestern Louisiana		Louisiana Tech Stadium; Ruston, LA (rivalry)	W 34–21	19,000	
October 18	vs. Northwestern State	No. 17	State Fair Stadium; Shreveport, LA (rivalry)	W 42–21	31,000	
October 25	at Chattanooga*	No. 11	Chamberlain Field; Chattanooga, TN	W 55–7	5,000	
November 1	Southern Miss*	No. 5	Louisiana Tech Stadium; Ruston, LA (rivalry)	L 23–24	14,000	
November 8	at Southeastern Louisiana	No. 8	Strawberry Stadium; Hammond, LA	W 25–24	8,000	
November 15	Lamar Tech*	No. 7	Louisiana Tech Stadium; Ruston, LA	W 77–40	10,000	
November 22	Northeast Louisiana	No. 4	Louisiana Tech Stadium; Ruston, LA (rivalry)	W 34–6	13,000	
December 13	vs. No. 20 East Tennessee State*	No. 4	Memorial Stadium; Baton Rouge, LA (Grantland Rice Bowl)	L 14–34	16,101	
*Non-conference game; Rankings from AP Poll released prior to the game

== NFL draft ==
Quarterback Terry Bradshaw was the first overall pick of the 1970 NFL draft, selected by the Pittsburgh Steelers.
