= 1968 McNeese State Cowboys football team =

American college football season

1968 McNeese State Cowboys football
- Conference: Gulf States Conference
- Record: 4–6 (1–4 GSC)
- Head coach: Jim Clark (3rd season)
- Home stadium: Cowboy Stadium

1968 Gulf States Conference football standings
	Conf.					Overall
Team	W		L		T	W		L		T
No. 8/10 Southwestern Louisiana $	4	–	1	–	0	8	–	2	–	0
Louisiana Tech	3	–	2	–	0	9	–	2	–	0
Northeast Louisiana State	3	–	2	–	0	6	–	4	–	0
Northwestern State	2	–	3	–	0	5	–	4	–	0
Southeastern Louisiana	2	–	3	–	0	4	–	6	–	0
McNeese State	1	–	4	–	0	4	–	6	–	0
$ – Conference champion; Rankings from NAIA poll and AP small college poll

The 1968 McNeese State Cowboys football team was an American football team that represented McNeese State College (now known as McNeese State University) as a member of the Gulf States Conference (GSC) during the 1968 NCAA College Division football season. In their second year under head coach Jim Clark, the team compiled an overall record of 4–6 with a mark of 1–4 in conference play, and finished sixth in the GSC.

== Schedule ==
Date	Opponent	Site	Result	Attendance	Source
September 21	at Lamar Tech*	Cardinal Stadium; Beaumont, TX (rivalry)	W 10–0	14,633	
September 28	Tennessee–Martin*	Cowboy Stadium; Lake Charles, LA	W 17–0	9,200	
October 5	at No. 11 Louisiana Tech	Louisiana Tech Stadium; Ruston, LA	W 27–20	14,000	
October 12	at UT Arlington*	Memorial Stadium; Arlington, TX	L 21–46	9,000	
October 19	Northeast Louisiana State	Cowboy Stadium; Lake Charles, LA	L 14–21	12,200	
October 26	Pensacola NAS*	Cowboy Stadium; Lake Charles, LA	W 54–13	10,000	
November 2	at Troy State*	Veterans Memorial Stadium; Troy, AL	L 0–52	9,000	
November 9	Northwestern State	Cowboy Stadium; Lake Charles, LA (rivalry)	L 12–28	10,500	
November 16	at Southeastern Louisiana	Strawberry Stadium; Hammond, LA	L 3–17	5,000	
November 23	Southwestern Louisiana	Cowboy Stadium; Lake Charles, LA (rivalry)	L 7–12	12,300	
*Non-conference game; Rankings from AP Poll released prior to the game
