= 1962 Southwestern Louisiana Bulldogs football team =

American college football season

1962 Southwestern Louisiana Bulldogs football
- Conference: Gulf States Conference
- Record: 4–5–1 (2–3 GSC)
- Head coach: Russ Faulkinberry (2nd season)
- Home stadium: McNaspy Stadium

1962 Gulf States Conference football standings
	Conf.					Overall
Team	W		L		T	W		L		T
Northwestern State $	4	–	1	–	0	7	–	2	–	1
McNeese State	3	–	2	–	0	6	–	2	–	1
Southeastern Louisiana	3	–	2	–	0	6	–	3	–	0
Louisiana Tech	2	–	3	–	0	4	–	4	–	0
Southwestern Louisiana	2	–	3	–	0	4	–	5	–	1
Northeast Louisiana State	1	–	4	–	0	2	–	6	–	0
$ – Conference champion

The 1962 Southwestern Louisiana Bulldogs football team was an American football team that represented the University of Southwestern Louisiana (now known as the University of Louisiana at Lafayette) in the Gulf States Conference during the 1962 NCAA College Division football season. In their second year under head coach Russ Faulkinberry, the team compiled a 4–5–1 record.

== Schedule ==
Date	Opponent	Site	Result	Attendance	Source
September 15	Instituto Politécnico Nacional*	McNaspy Stadium; Lafayette, LA	W 21–0	3,000	
September 21	Southeastern Louisiana	McNaspy Stadium; Lafayette, LA (rivalry)	L 6–21	6,200	
September 29	at Southern Miss*	Faulkner Field; Hattiesburg, MS	L 0–20	8,000	
October 6	Louisiana Tech	McNaspy Stadium; Lafayette, LA (rivalry)	W 13–6	7,000	
October 13	Tampa*	McNaspy Stadium; Lafayette, LA	T 14–14	8,000	
October 20	at Louisiana College*	Alumni Stadium; Pineville, LA	L 6–12	500	
October 27	vs. Northeast Louisiana State	State Fair Stadium; Shreveport, LA (rivalry)	W 18–10	2,500–3,000	
November 2	Austin*	McNaspy Stadium; Lafayette, LA	W 38–12	4,000	
November 10	at Northwestern State	Demon Stadium; Natchitoches, LA	L 0–20	4,300	
November 17	at McNeese State	Wildcat Stadium; Lake Charles, LA (rivalry)	L 0–19	4,300	
*Non-conference game
