= Jim Clark (American football coach) =

American football coach

Biographical details
- Born: October 25, 1926; Morgan City, Mississippi, U.S.
- Died: May 20, 2003 (aged 76); Lake Charles, Louisiana, U.S.

Playing career
- 1944: Ole Miss
- 1947–1949: Ole Miss
- Position: Tackle

Coaching career (HC unless noted)
- 1950: Canton HS (MS) (assistant)
- 1951–1954: Jones County (assistant)
- 1955–1956: Jones County
- 1957–1958: DeRidder HS (LA)
- 1959–1965: McNeese State (assistant)
- 1966–1969: McNeese State

Head coaching record
- Overall: 17–22 (college); 19–3 (junior college); 8–2–1 (high school)

Accomplishments and honors

Championships
- 2 GSC (1967)

Awards
- GSC Coach of the Year (1967)

James Edward Clark (October 25, 1926 – May 20, 2003) was an American football coach. He served as the head football coach at the McNeese State University from 1966 to 1969, compiling a record of 17–22. Clark attended high school in Belzoni, Mississippi and played college football at the University of Mississippi (Ole Miss) before graduating in 1950. He earned a master's degree at Mississippi Southern College—now known as University of Southern Mississippi—in 1957.

== Head coaching record ==
=== College ===
Year	Team	Overall	Conference	Standing	Bowl/playoffs
McNeese State Cowboys (Gulf States Conference) (1966–1969)
1966	McNeese State	5–5	3–2	T–2nd	
1967	McNeese State	4–5	4–1	1st	
1968	McNeese State	4–6	1–4	6th	
1969	McNeese State	4–6	1–4	5th	
McNeese State:		17–22	9–11		
Total:		17–22			
National championship Conference title Conference division title or championship game berth
