= 1964 McNeese State Cowboys football team =

American college football season

1964 McNeese State Cowboys football
- Conference: Gulf States Conference
- Record: 6–3 (3–2 GSC)
- Head coach: Les DeVall (8th season)
- Home stadium: Wildcat Stadium

1964 Gulf States Conference football standings
	Conf.					Overall
Team	W		L		T	W		L		T
Louisiana Tech $	5	–	0	–	0	9	–	1	–	0
Southeastern Louisiana	4	–	1	–	0	6	–	3	–	0
McNeese State	3	–	2	–	0	6	–	3	–	0
Southwestern Louisiana	2	–	3	–	0	5	–	4	–	0
Northwestern State	1	–	4	–	0	4	–	5	–	0
Northeast Louisiana State	0	–	5	–	0	0	–	8	–	0
$ – Conference champion

The 1964 McNeese State Cowboys football team was an American football team that represented McNeese State College (now known as McNeese State University) as a member of the Gulf States Conference (GSC) during the 1964 NCAA College Division football season. In their eighth year under head coach Les DeVall, the team compiled an overall record of 6–3 with a mark of 3–2 in conference play, and finished third in the GSC.

== Schedule ==
Date	Opponent	Site	Result	Attendance	Source
September 26	at Louisiana Tech	Tech Stadium; Ruston, LA	L 6–10	9,500	
October 3	at Howard (AL)*	Seibert Stadium; Homewood, AL	W 7–6	4,000	
October 10	at Tampa*	Phillips Field; Tampa, FL	W 12–0	4,500	
October 17	Northeast Louisiana State	Wildcat Stadium; Lake Charles, LA	W 21–6	6,000–6,200	
October 24	at Memphis State*	Crump Stadium; Memphis, TN	L 0–23	11,542	
October 31	Louisiana College*	Wildcat Stadium; Lake Charles, LA	W 34–7	6,000	
November 7	Northwestern State	Wildcat Stadium; Lake Charles, LA (rivalry)	W 12–10	6,500	
November 14	at Southeastern Louisiana	Strawberry Stadium; Hammond, LA	L 2–7	7,000	
November 21	Southwestern Louisiana	Wildcat Stadium; Lake Charles, LA (rivalry)	W 24–9	7,500	
*Non-conference game
