= 1962 McNeese State Cowboys football team =

American college football season

1962 McNeese State Cowboys football

Golden Isles Bowl, W 21–14 vs. Howard (AL)
- Conference: Gulf States Conference
- Record: 6–2–1 (3–2 GSC)
- Head coach: Les DeVall (6th season)
- Home stadium: Wildcat Stadium

1962 Gulf States Conference football standings
	Conf.					Overall
Team	W		L		T	W		L		T
Northwestern State $	4	–	1	–	0	7	–	2	–	1
McNeese State	3	–	2	–	0	6	–	2	–	1
Southeastern Louisiana	3	–	2	–	0	6	–	3	–	0
Louisiana Tech	2	–	3	–	0	4	–	4	–	0
Southwestern Louisiana	2	–	3	–	0	4	–	5	–	1
Northeast Louisiana State	1	–	4	–	0	2	–	6	–	0
$ – Conference champion

The 1962 McNeese State Cowboys football team was an American football team that represented McNeese State College (now known as McNeese State University) as a member of the Gulf States Conference (GSC) during the 1962 NCAA College Division football season. In their sixth year under head coach Les DeVall, the team compiled an overall record of 6–2–1 with a mark of 3–2 in conference play, and finished tied for second place in the GSC.

== Schedule ==
Date	Opponent	Site	Result	Attendance	Source
September 22	Instituto Politécnico Nacional*	Wildcat Stadium; Lake Charles, LA	W 40–0	4,500	
September 29	at Louisiana Tech	Tech Stadium; Ruston, LA	L 6–14	7,500	
October 6	at Tampa*	Phillips Field; Tampa, FL	T 10–10	6,000	
October 13	Northeast Louisiana State	Wildcat Stadium; Lake Charles, LA	W 13–8	6,000–7,000	
October 27	Louisiana College*	Wildcat Stadium; Lake Charles, LA	W 28–14	6,500	
November 3	Northwestern State	Wildcat Stadium; Lake Charles, LA (rivalry)	W 26–6	6,500	
November 10	at Southeastern Louisiana	Strawberry Stadium; Hammond, LA	L 15–21	7,500	
November 17	Southwestern Louisiana	Wildcat Stadium; Lake Charles, LA (rivalry)	W 19–0	4,300	
December 1	vs. Howard (AL)*	Brunswick, GA (Golden Isles Bowl)	W 21–14		
*Non-conference game
