= 1967 McNeese State Cowboys football team =

American college football season

1967 McNeese State Cowboys football

GSC champion
- Conference: Gulf States Conference
- Record: 4–5 (4–1 GSC)
- Head coach: Jim Clark (2nd season)
- Home stadium: Cowboy Stadium

1967 Gulf States Conference football standings
	Conf.					Overall
Team	W		L		T	W		L		T
McNeese State $	4	–	1	–	0	4	–	5	–	0
Southwestern Louisiana	3	–	2	–	0	6	–	4	–	0
Northeast Louisiana State	3	–	2	–	0	7	–	3	–	0
Northwestern State	3	–	2	–	0	6	–	3	–	0
Southeastern Louisiana	2	–	3	–	0	4	–	5	–	0
Louisiana Tech	0	–	5	–	0	3	–	7	–	0
$ – Conference champion

The 1967 McNeese State Cowboys football team was an American football team that represented McNeese State College (now known as McNeese State University) as a member of the Gulf States Conference (GSC) during the 1967 NCAA College Division football season. In their second year under head coach Jim Clark, the team compiled an overall record of 4–5 with a mark of 4–1 in conference play, and finished as GSC champion.

== Schedule ==
Date	Opponent	Site	Result	Attendance	Source
September 16	Texas A&I*	Cowboy Stadium; Lake Charles, LA	L 3–17	10,000	
September 23	at Pensacola NAS*	Kane Field; Penscaola, FL	L 7–14	3,500	
September 30	Louisiana Tech	Cowboy Stadium; Lake Charles, LA	W 20–12	9,500	
October 7	No. 7 UT Arlington*	Cowboy Stadium; Lake Charles, LA	L 16–17	10,000	
October 14	at Northeast Louisiana State	Brown Stadium; Monroe, LA	W 8–7	7,500–10,000	
October 21	Lamar Tech*	Cowboy Stadium; Lake Charles, LA (rivalry)	L 8–24	11,000	
November 4	at Northwestern State	Demon Stadium; Natchitoches, LA (rivalry)	W 21–7	7,500	
November 11	Southeastern Louisiana	Cowboy Stadium; Lake Charles, LA	W 23–8	11,000	
November 18	at Southwestern Louisiana	McNaspy Stadium; Lafayette, LA (rivalry)	L 6–31	13,500	
*Non-conference game; Rankings from AP Poll released prior to the game
