= 1969 Southwestern Louisiana Bulldogs football team =

American college football season

1969 Southwestern Louisiana Bulldogs football
- Conference: Gulf States Conference
- Record: 5–5 (3–2 GSC)
- Head coach: Russ Faulkinberry (9th season)
- Home stadium: McNaspy Stadium

1969 Gulf States Conference football standings
	Conf.					Overall
Team	W		L		T	W		L		T
Louisiana Tech $	5	–	0	–	0	8	–	2	–	0
Northwestern State	4	–	1	–	0	7	–	2	–	0
Southwestern Louisiana	3	–	2	–	0	5	–	5	–	0
Southeastern Louisiana	2	–	3	–	0	5	–	5	–	0
McNeese State	1	–	4	–	0	4	–	6	–	0
Northeast Louisiana	0	–	5	–	0	1	–	9	–	0
$ – Conference champion

The 1969 Southwestern Louisiana Bulldogs football team was an American football team that represented the University of Southwestern Louisiana (now known as the University of Louisiana at Lafayette) in the Gulf States Conference during the 1969 NCAA College Division football season. In their ninth year under head coach Russ Faulkinberry, the team compiled a 5–5 record.

== Schedule ==
Date	Time	Opponent	Site	Result	Attendance	Source
September 20	7:30 p.m.	at North Texas State*	Fouts Field; Denton, TX	L 6–40	12,300	
September 27		East Texas State*	McNaspy Stadium; Lafayette, LA	L 13–24	12,000	
October 4		at Southeastern Louisiana	Strawberry Stadium; Hammond, LA (rivalry)	W 9–3	7,700	
October 11		at Louisiana Tech	Louisiana Tech Stadium; Ruston, LA (rivalry)	L 21–34	19,000	
October 18		at Arkansas State*	War Memorial Stadium; Little Rock, AR	L 0–26	14,000	
October 25		at Lamar Tech*	Cardinal Stadium; Beaumont, TX (rivalry)	W 24–16	11,175	
November 1		Northeast Louisiana	McNaspy Stadium; Lafayette, LA (rivalry)	W 9–7	12,000	
November 8		St. Norbert*	McNaspy Stadium; Lafayette, LA	W 48–37	10,000	
November 15		Northwestern State	McNaspy Stadium; Lafayette, LA	L 28–33	15,000	
November 22		McNeese State	McNaspy Stadium; Lafayette, LA (rivalry)	W 21–17	10,000–12,000	
*Non-conference game; All times are in Central time
