= 1965 Louisiana Tech Bulldogs football team =

American college football season

1965 Louisiana Tech Bulldogs football
- Conference: Gulf States Conference
- Record: 4–4 (3–2 GSC)
- Head coach: Joe Aillet (25th season)
- Captains: Wayne Davis; Dan Irby; Billy Laird; Gerald McDowell; Tom Robertson
- Home stadium: Tech Stadium

1965 Gulf States Conference football standings
	Conf.					Overall
Team	W		L		T	W		L		T
Southwestern Louisiana +	4	–	1	–	0	6	–	3	–	0
McNeese State +	4	–	1	–	0	5	–	4	–	0
Louisiana Tech	3	–	2	–	0	4	–	4	–	0
Northwestern State	2	–	3	–	0	5	–	3	–	0
Southeastern Louisiana	2	–	3	–	0	5	–	4	–	0
Northeast Louisiana State	0	–	5	–	0	1	–	8	–	0
+ – Conference co-champions

The 1965 Louisiana Tech Bulldogs football team was an American football team that represented the Louisiana Polytechnic Institute (now known as Louisiana Tech University) as a member of the Gulf States Conference during the 1965 NCAA College Division football season. In their twenty-fifth year under head coach Joe Aillet, the team compiled a 4–4 record.

== Schedule ==
Date	Opponent	Rank	Site	Result	Attendance	Source
September 18	at Rice*		Rice Stadium; Houston, TX	L 0–14	22,000	
October 2	at McNeese State	No. 7	Cowboy Stadium; Lake Charles, LA	L 14–20	10,200	
October 9	Southwestern Louisiana		Tech Stadium; Ruston, LA (rivalry)	L 8–16	9,000	
October 23	vs. Northwestern State		State Fair Stadium; Shreveport, LA (rivalry)	W 42–14	27,000	
October 30	Tennessee Tech*		Tech Stadium; Ruston, LA	W 20–6	8,000	
November 6	at Southeastern Louisiana		Strawberry Stadium; Hammond, LA	W 16–14	10,000	
November 13	Southern Miss*		Tech Stadium; Ruston, LA (rivalry)	L 7–31	8,000	
November 20	Northeast Louisiana State		Tech Stadium; Ruston, LA (rivalry)	W 54–7	9,000	
*Non-conference game; Rankings from AP Poll released prior to the game
