= Pat Kenelly =

American sports coach and college athletics administrator

Biographical details
- Born: October 7, 1922; Darbun, Mississippi, U.S.
- Died: December 12, 2000 (aged 78); Hammond, Louisiana, U.S.

Playing career

Football
- 1946: Southeastern Louisiana

Coaching career (HC unless noted)

Football
- 1965–1971: Southeastern Louisiana

Baseball
- 1951–1964: Southeastern Louisiana

Administrative career (AD unless noted)
- 1971–1976: Southeastern Louisiana

Head coaching record
- Overall: 25–43 (football); 230–180–4 (baseball)

Patrick Gumphrey Kenelly (October 7, 1922 – December 12, 2000) was an American football and baseball coach and college athletics administrator. He served as the eighth head football coach at Southeastern Louisiana University in Hammond, Louisiana and he held that position for seven seasons, from 1965 until 1971, compiling a record of 25–43.

Kenelly was also the head baseball coach at Southeastern Louisiana from 1951 to 1964. His tenure was the longest of any head coach in the history of the Southeastern Louisiana Lions baseball program. Southeastern Louisiana's baseball facility, Pat Kenelly Diamond at Alumni Field, is named for him. The diamond was dedicated on February 19, 2006.

== Head coaching record ==
=== Football ===
Year	Team	Overall	Conference	Standing	Bowl/playoffs
Southeastern Louisiana Lions (Gulf States Conference) (1965–1970)
1965	Southeastern Louisiana	5–4	2–3	T–4th	
1966	Southeastern Louisiana	3–6	1–4	T–5th	
1967	Southeastern Louisiana	4–5	2–3	5th	
1968	Southeastern Louisiana	4–6	2–3	T–4th	
1969	Southeastern Louisiana	5–5	2–3	4th	
1970	Southeastern Louisiana	4–6	2–3	T–4th	
Southeastern Louisiana Lions (Gulf South Conference) (1971)
1971	Southeastern Louisiana	0–11	0–6	T–6th	
Southeastern Louisiana:		25–43	11–25		
Total:		25–43			
