= 1967 Louisiana Tech Bulldogs football team =

American college football season

1967 Louisiana Tech Bulldogs football
- Conference: Gulf States Conference
- Record: 3–7 (0–5 GSC)
- Head coach: Maxie Lambright (1st season)
- Captains: Joe Peace; Alden Reeves; Eddie Taylor
- Home stadium: Tech Stadium

1967 Gulf States Conference football standings
	Conf.					Overall
Team	W		L		T	W		L		T
McNeese State $	4	–	1	–	0	4	–	5	–	0
Southwestern Louisiana	3	–	2	–	0	6	–	4	–	0
Northeast Louisiana State	3	–	2	–	0	7	–	3	–	0
Northwestern State	3	–	2	–	0	6	–	3	–	0
Southeastern Louisiana	2	–	3	–	0	4	–	5	–	0
Louisiana Tech	0	–	5	–	0	3	–	7	–	0
$ – Conference champion

The 1967 Louisiana Tech Bulldogs football team was an American football team that represented the Louisiana Polytechnic Institute (now known as Louisiana Tech University) as a member of the Gulf States Conference during the 1967 NCAA College Division football season. In their first year under head coach Maxie Lambright, the team compiled a 3–7 record.

== Schedule ==
Date	Opponent	Site	Result	Attendance	Source
September 16	at Delta State*	Delta Field; Cleveland, MS	W 34–7	4,000	
September 30	at McNeese State	Cowboy Stadium; Lake Charles, LA	L 12–20	9,500	
October 7	Southwestern Louisiana^{†}	Tech Stadium; Ruston, LA (rivalry)	L 14–20	10,000	
October 14	No. 7 Arkansas State*	Tech Stadium; Ruston, LA	W 6–3	10,000	
October 21	vs. No. 5 Northwestern State	State Fair Stadium; Shreveport, LA (rivalry)	L 0–7	28,000	
October 28	at New Mexico State*	Memorial Stadium; Las Cruces, NM	L 7–48	6,000	
November 4	at Southeastern Louisiana	Strawberry Stadium; Hammond, LA	L 21–27	7,800	
November 11	No. 7 Lamar Tech*	Tech Stadium; Ruston, LA	W 41–31	6,500–7,500	
November 18	Northeast Louisiana State	Tech Stadium; Ruston, LA (rivalry)	L 14–21	8,000–9,000	
November 23	Southern Miss*	State Fair Stadium; Shreveport, LA (rivalry)	L 7–58	4,500	
*Non-conference game; ^{†}Homecoming; Rankings from AP Poll released prior to the game
