= 1966 McNeese State Cowboys football team =

American college football season

1966 McNeese State Cowboys football
- Conference: Gulf States Conference
- Record: 5–5 (3–2 GSC)
- Head coach: Jim Clark (1st season)
- Home stadium: Cowboy Stadium

1966 Gulf States Conference football standings
	Conf.					Overall
Team	W		L		T	W		L		T
No. 4 Northwestern State $	5	–	0	–	0	9	–	0	–	0
Southwestern Louisiana	3	–	2	–	0	6	–	4	–	0
McNeese State	3	–	2	–	0	5	–	5	–	0
Northeast Louisiana State	2	–	3	–	0	7	–	3	–	0
Southeastern Louisiana	1	–	4	–	0	3	–	6	–	0
Louisiana Tech	1	–	4	–	0	1	–	9	–	0
$ – Conference champion; Rankings from NAIA poll

The 1966 McNeese State Cowboys football team was an American football team that represented McNeese State College (now known as McNeese State University) as a member of the Gulf States Conference (GSC) during the 1966 NCAA College Division football season. In their first year under head coach Jim Clark, the team compiled an overall record of 5–5 with a mark of 3–2 in conference play, and finished tied for second in the GSC.

== Schedule ==
Date	Opponent	Site	Result	Attendance	Source
September 17	at Texas A&I*	Javelina Stadium; Kingsville, TX	L 6–12	7,500	
September 24	Pensacola NAS*	Cowboy Stadium; Lake Charles, LA	W 21–7	9,500	
October 1	at Louisiana Tech	Tech Stadium; Ruston, LA	W 10–7	10,000	
October 8	at Arlington State*	Memorial Stadium; Arlington, TX	L 0–20	8,000	
October 15	Northeast Louisiana State	Cowboy Stadium; Lake Charles, LA	W 18–17	9,000	
October 22	at Lamar Tech*	Cardinal Stadium; Beaumont, TX (rivalry)	L 7–10	12,121	
October 29	Louisiana College*	Cowboy Stadium; Lake Charles, LA	W 31–0	11,000	
November 5	No. 5 Northwestern State	Cowboy Stadium; Lake Charles, LA (rivalry)	L 6–14	11,500	
November 12	at Southeastern Louisiana	Strawberry Stadium; Hammond, LA	W 28–12	7,500	
November 19	Southwestern Louisiana	Cowboy Stadium; Lake Charles, LA (rivalry)	L 0–7	12,300	
*Non-conference game; Rankings from AP Poll released prior to the game
