= 1967 Southwestern Louisiana Bulldogs football team =

American college football season

1967 Southwestern Louisiana Bulldogs football
- Conference: Gulf States Conference
- Record: 6–4 (3–2 GSC)
- Head coach: Russ Faulkinberry (7th season)
- Home stadium: McNaspy Stadium

1967 Gulf States Conference football standings
	Conf.					Overall
Team	W		L		T	W		L		T
McNeese State $	4	–	1	–	0	4	–	5	–	0
Southwestern Louisiana	3	–	2	–	0	6	–	4	–	0
Northeast Louisiana State	3	–	2	–	0	7	–	3	–	0
Northwestern State	3	–	2	–	0	6	–	3	–	0
Southeastern Louisiana	2	–	3	–	0	4	–	5	–	0
Louisiana Tech	0	–	5	–	0	3	–	7	–	0
$ – Conference champion

The 1967 Southwestern Louisiana Bulldogs football team was an American football team that represented the University of Southwestern Louisiana (now known as the University of Louisiana at Lafayette) in the Gulf States Conference during the 1967 NCAA College Division football season. In their seventh year under head coach Russ Faulkinberry, the team compiled a 6–4 record.

== Schedule ==
Date	Opponent	Site	Result	Attendance	Source
September 16	at Louisiana College*	Alumni Stadium; Pineville, LA	W 28–14	12,000	
September 23	at Lamar Tech*	Cardinal Stadium; Beaumont, TX (rivalry)	L 13–14	13,277	
September 30	Pensacola NAS*	McNaspy Stadium; Lafayette, LA	W 13–3	12,500	
October 7	at Louisiana Tech	Tech Stadium; Ruston, LA (rivalry)	W 20–14	10,000	
October 14	at Southeastern Louisiana	Strawberry Stadium; Hammond, LA (rivalry)	W 9–0	8,000	
October 21	at Memphis State*	Memphis Memorial Stadium; Memphis, TN	L 6–28	16,829	
October 28	Northeast Louisiana State	McNaspy Stadium; Lafayette, LA (rivalry)	L 6–17	15,500	
November 4	at Arkansas State*	Kays Stadium; Jonesboro, AR	W 7–6	5,300	
November 11	Northwestern State	McNaspy Stadium; Lafayette, LA	L 9–24	10,500	
November 18	McNeese State	McNaspy Stadium; Lafayette, LA (Cajun Crown)	W 31–6	13,500	
*Non-conference game
