= Groseclose Track at Brown Stadium =

Soccer stadium in Monroe, Louisiana

Brown Stadium

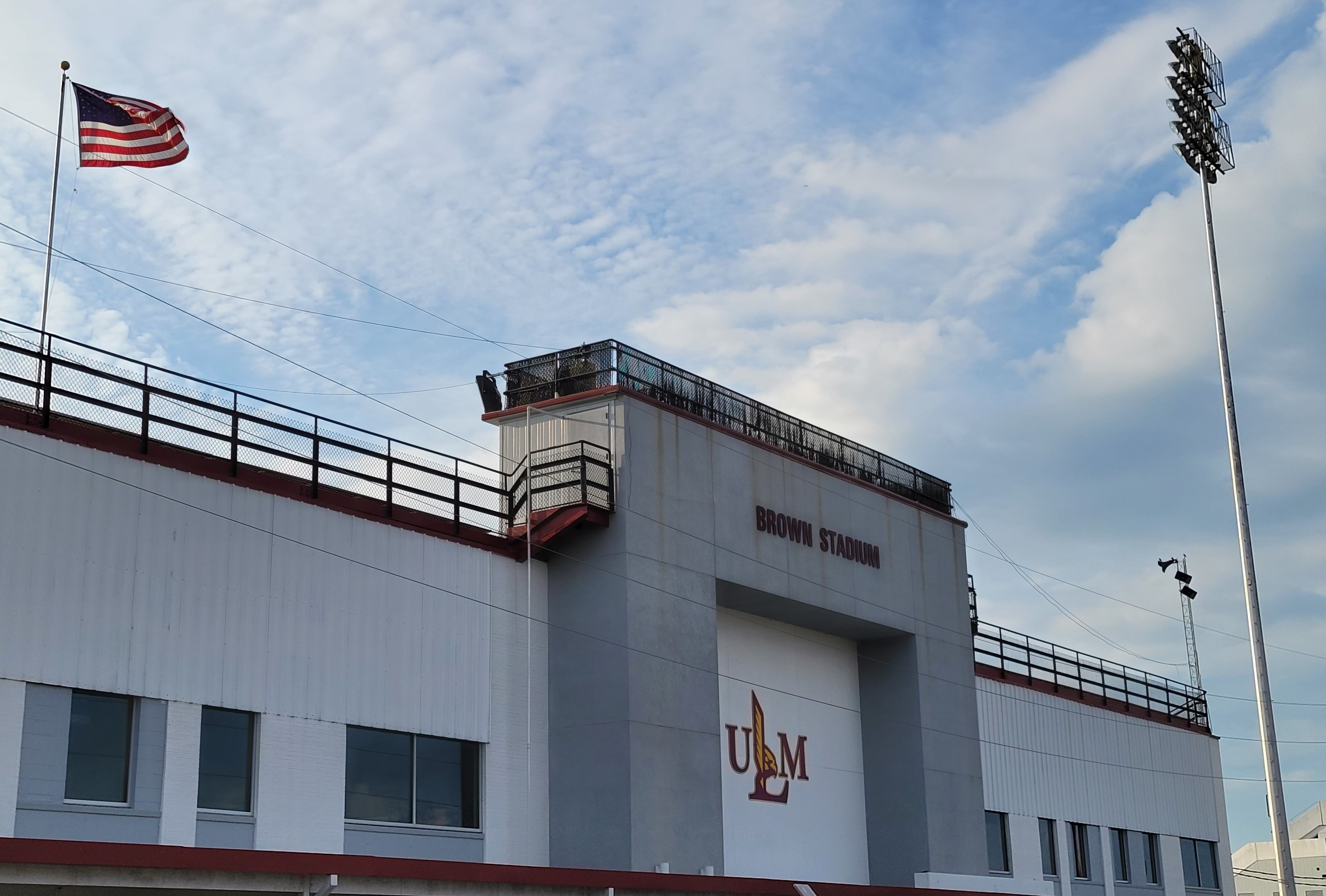
- Groseclose Track at Brown Stadium
- Interactive map of Brown Stadium
- Full name: Groseclose Track at Brown Stadium
- Address: 518 Warhawk Way; Monroe, LA; United States
- Coordinates: 32°31′58″N 92°3′56″W
- Owner: University of Louisiana at Monroe
- Operator: Univ. of Louisiana Athletics
- Capacity: 3,000
- Type: Stadium
- Surface: Grass
- Current use: Soccer; Track and field

Construction
- Opened: 1933; 93 years ago
- Renovated: 2018

Tenants
- Louisiana–Monroe Warhawks (NCAA) teams: women's soccer; men's and women's track and field; football (1951-1977)

Website
- ulmwarhawks.com/brown-stadium

Brown Stadium is a stadium in Monroe, Louisiana, United States, on the campus of the University of Louisiana at Monroe. The track surrounding the field is named "Groseclose Track". It is the home facility for the Louisiana-Monroe Warhawks' soccer and track and field teams. The capacity of the stadium is 3,000.

Brown Stadium was the home field of the Louisiana–Monroe Warhawks football team from 1951 to 1977. The facility was renovated in 2018 as part of a $5 million project that included new offices for soccer and track coaches, locker rooms and storage areas. Press box renovations and resurfacing of the parking lot were also included.

The Louisiana-Monroe Warhawks women's soccer team hosted its first match at the renovated facility in a preseason exhibition against Stephen F. Austin on August 16, 2019.

== Gallery ==
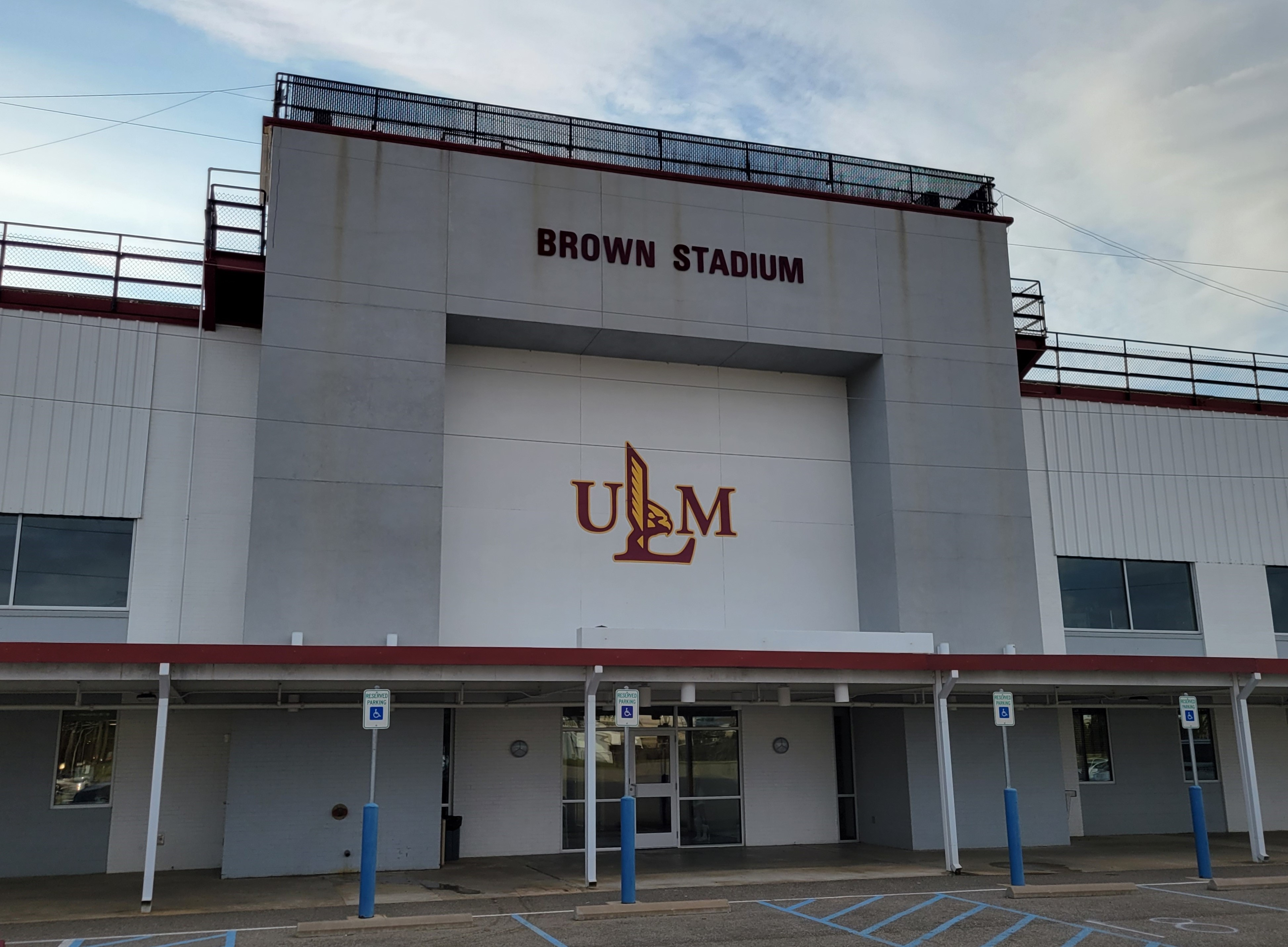
Groseclose Track at Brown Stadium exterior

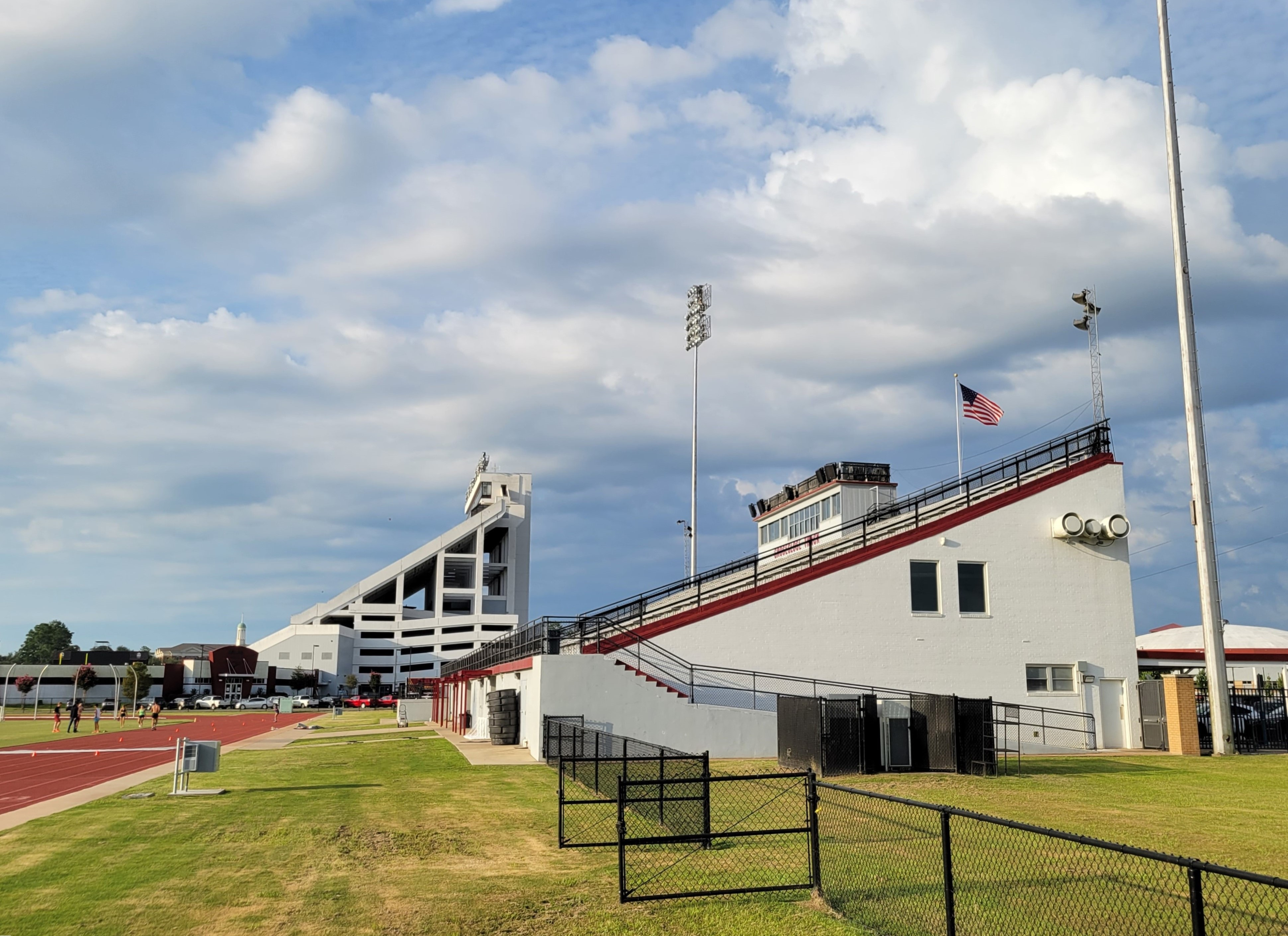
Groseclose Track at Brown Stadium stands

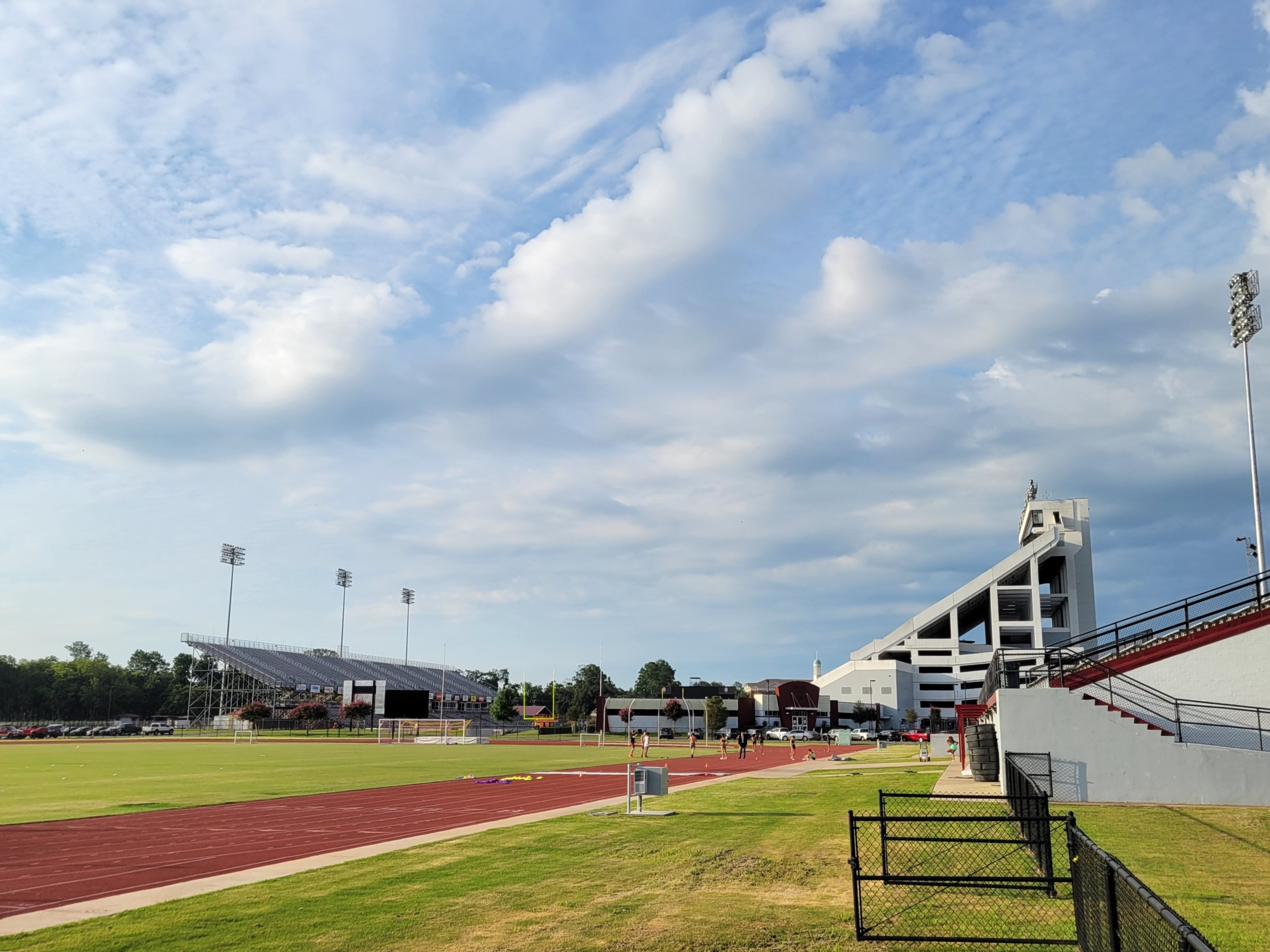
Groseclose Track at Brown Stadium stands with Malone Stadium

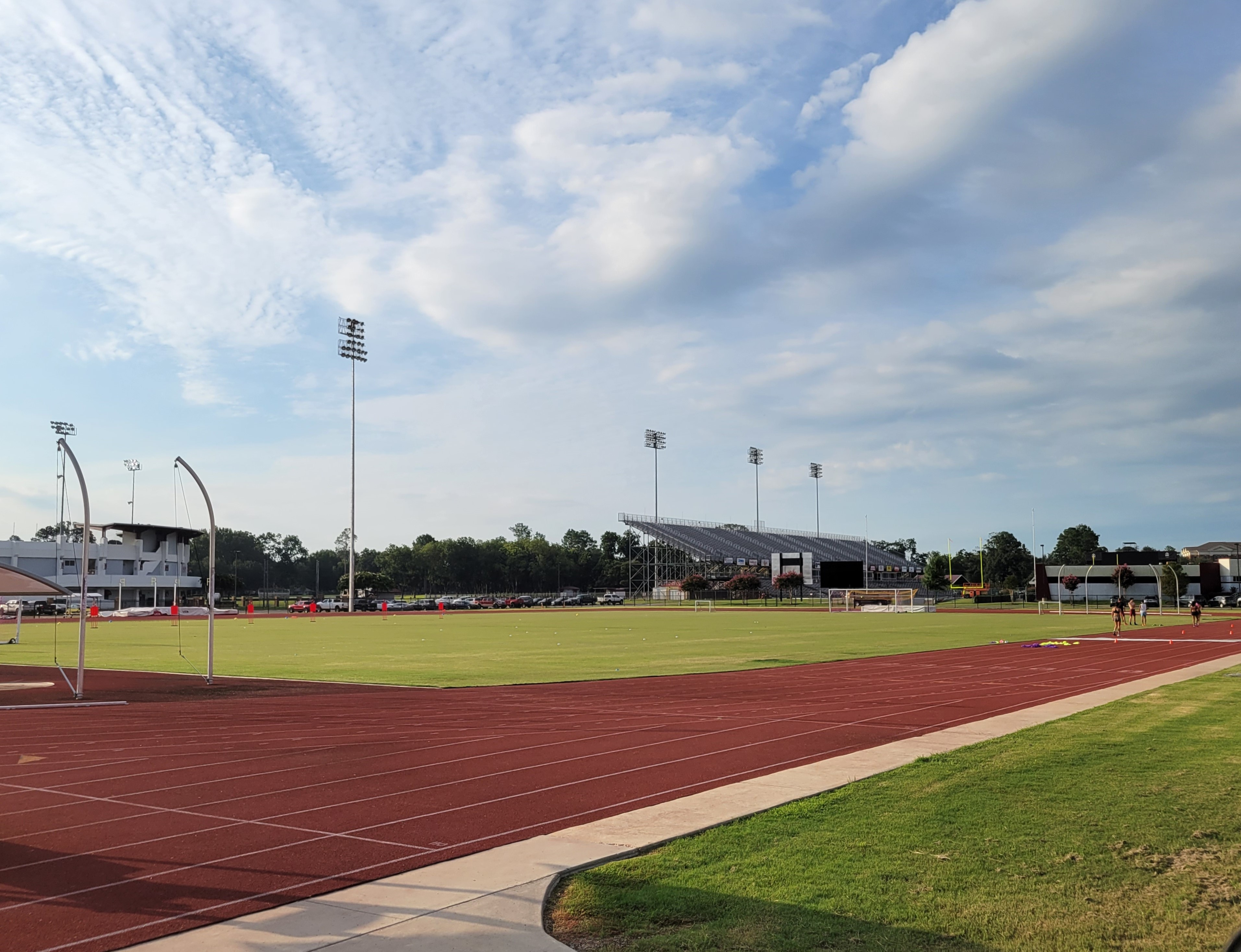
Groseclose Track at Brown Stadium, track and field area & Malone Stadium away stands and football fieldhouse

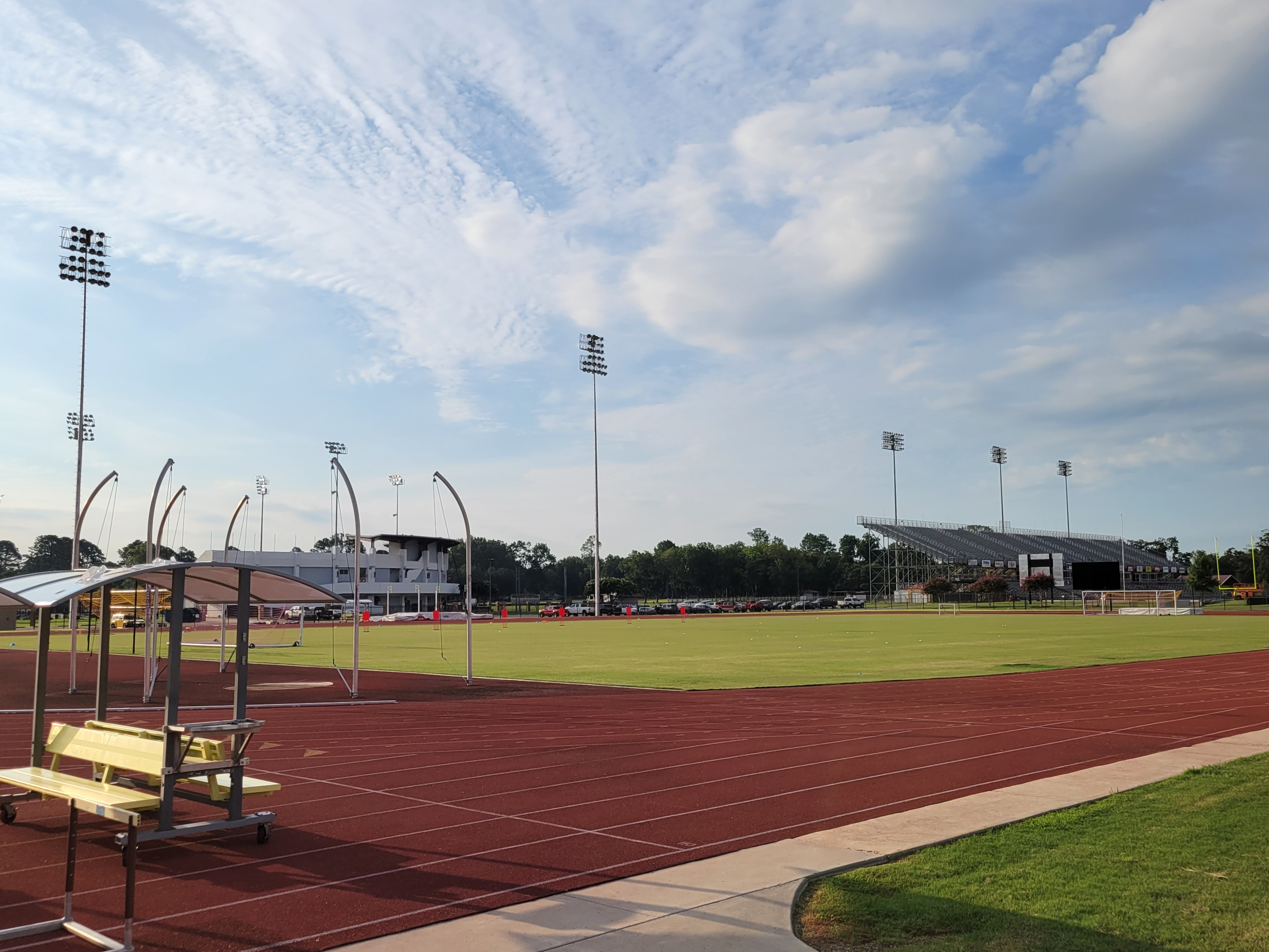
Groseclose Track at Brown Stadium, track and field area

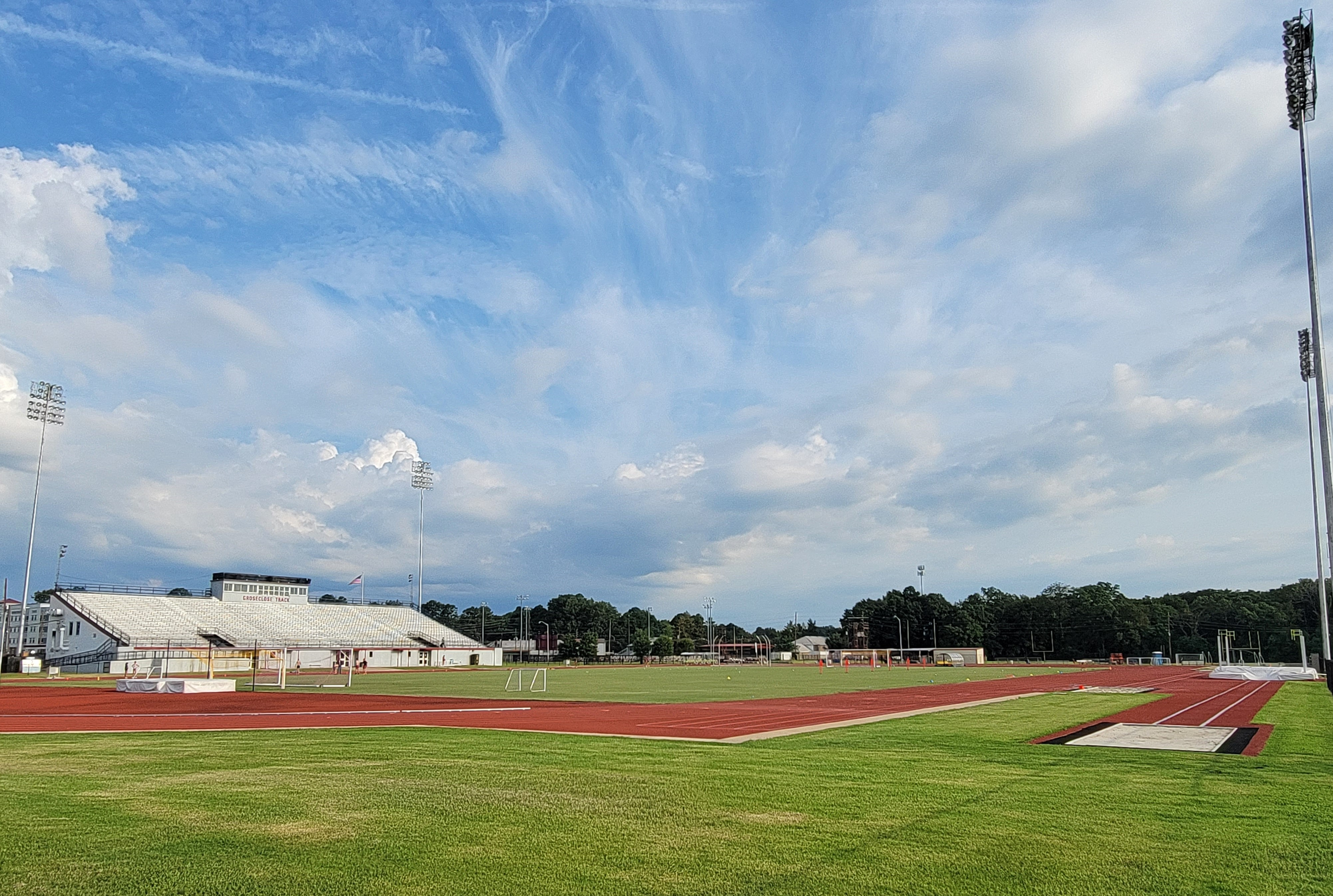
Groseclose Track at Brown Stadium, track and field area with stands
