= 1951 Southwestern Louisiana Bulldogs football team =

American college football season

1951 Southwestern Louisiana Bulldogs football
- Conference: Gulf States Conference
- Record: 6–4 (3–2 GSC)
- Head coach: Raymond Didier (1st season)
- Home stadium: McNaspy Stadium

1951 Gulf States Conference football standings
	Conf.					Overall
Team	W		L		T	W		L		T
Mississippi Southern $	4	–	0	–	0	6	–	5	–	0
Southeastern Louisiana	4	–	1	–	0	7	–	3	–	0
Southwestern Louisiana	3	–	2	–	0	6	–	4	–	0
Louisiana Tech	2	–	3	–	0	4	–	5	–	0
Louisiana College	1	–	3	–	0	5	–	6	–	0
Northwestern State	0	–	5	–	0	1	–	8	–	0
$ – Conference champion

The 1951 Southwestern Louisiana Bulldogs football team was an American football team that represented the Southwestern Louisiana Institute of Liberal and Technical Learning (now known as the University of Louisiana at Lafayette) in the Gulf States Conference during the 1951 college football season. In their first year under head coach Raymond Didier, the team compiled a 6–4 record.

== Schedule ==
Date	Opponent	Site	Result	Attendance	Source
September 15	Northeast Louisiana State*	McNaspy Stadium; Lafayette, LA (rivalry)	L 7–13		
September 22	at McNeese State*	Killen Field; Lake Charles, LA (rivalry)	W 35–14	5,200	
September 29	at Southeastern Louisiana	Strawberry Stadium; Hammond, LA (rivalry)	L 0–14		
October 6	at Troy State*	Veterans Memorial Stadium; Troy, AL	W 44–7		
October 13	Mississippi Southern	McNaspy Stadium; Lafayette, LA	L 0–41		
October 20	Memphis State*	McNaspy Stadium; Lafayette, LA	L 7–41		
October 27	at Stephen F. Austin*	Memorial Stadium; Nacogdoches, TX	W 32–14		
November 3	at Louisiana Tech	Tech Stadium; Ruston, LA (rivalry)	W 7–27		
November 10	Louisiana College	McNaspy Stadium; Lafayette, LA	W 27–21		
November 17	Northwestern State	McNaspy Stadium; Lafayette, LA	W 41–26	6,000	
*Non-conference game
