= 1956 Southwestern Louisiana Bulldogs football team =

American college football season

1956 Southwestern Louisiana Bulldogs football
- Conference: Gulf States Conference
- Record: 4–6 (1–5 GSC)
- Head coach: Raymond Didier (6th season)
- Home stadium: McNaspy Stadium

1956 Gulf States Conference football standings
	Conf.					Overall
Team	W		L		T	W		L		T
Southeastern Louisiana $	4	–	1	–	0	6	–	3	–	0
Northwestern State	3	–	1	–	1	6	–	2	–	2
Louisiana Tech	3	–	1	–	1	4	–	3	–	2
Northeast Louisiana State	2	–	3	–	0	7	–	3	–	0
McNeese State	2	–	3	–	0	5	–	5	–	0
Southwestern Louisiana	1	–	4	–	0	4	–	6	–	0
$ – Conference champion

The 1956 Southwestern Louisiana Bulldogs football team was an American football team that represented the Southwestern Louisiana Institute of Liberal and Technical Learning (now known as the University of Louisiana at Lafayette) in the Gulf States Conference during the 1956 college football season. In their sixth year under head coach Raymond Didier, the team compiled a 4–6 record.

== Schedule ==
Date	Opponent	Site	Result	Source
September 15	Lamar Tech*	McNaspy Stadium; Lafayette, LA (rivalry)	L 14–21	
September 22	Southeastern Louisiana	McNaspy Stadium; Lafayette, LA (rivalry)	L 0–42	
September 29	at East Texas State*	Memorial Stadium; Commerce, TX	W 33–27	
October 6	Northeast Louisiana State	McNaspy Stadium; Lafayette, LA (rivalry)	L 19–45	
October 13	Corpus Christi*	McNaspy Stadium; Lafayette, LA	W 67–14	
October 20	at Southern State (AR)*	Wilkins Stadium; Magnolia, AR	W 32–12	
October 27	Louisiana Tech	McNaspy Stadium; Lafayette, LA (rivalry)	L 6–33	
November 3	at Louisiana College	Alumni Stadium; Pineville, LA	L 14–34	
November 10	at Northwestern State	Demon Stadium; Natchitoches, LA	L 19–38	
November 17	at McNeese State	Wildcat Stadium; Lake Charles, LA (rivalry)	W 35–33	
*Non-conference game
