= 1952 Southwestern Louisiana Bulldogs football team =

American college football season

1952 Southwestern Louisiana Bulldogs football

GSC co-champion
- Conference: Gulf States Conference
- Record: 5–2–2 (3–0–2 GSC)
- Head coach: Raymond Didier (2nd season)
- Home stadium: McNaspy Stadium

1952 Gulf States Conference football standings
	Conf.					Overall
Team	W		L		T	W		L		T
Louisiana Tech +	3	–	0	–	2	6	–	1	–	2
Southeastern Louisiana +	3	–	0	–	2	6	–	1	–	2
Southwestern Louisiana +	3	–	0	–	2	5	–	2	–	2
McNeese State	2	–	3	–	0	7	–	3	–	0
Louisiana College	0	–	4	–	1	3	–	7	–	1
Northwestern State	0	–	4	–	1	1	–	7	–	1
+ – Conference co-champions

The 1952 Southwestern Louisiana Bulldogs football team was an American football team that represented the Southwestern Louisiana Institute of Liberal and Technical Learning (now known as the University of Louisiana at Lafayette) in the Gulf States Conference during the 1952 college football season. In their second year under head coach Raymond Didier, the team compiled a 5–2–2 record.

== Schedule ==
Date	Opponent	Site	Result	Attendance	Source
September 20	Lamar Tech*	McNaspy Stadium; Lafayette, LA (rivalry)	W 14–13		
September 27	Southeastern Louisiana	McNaspy Stadium; Lafayette, LA (rivalry)	T 13–13		
October 4	Troy State*	McNaspy Stadium; Lafayette, LA	W 54–14		
October 11	at Mississippi Southern*	Faulkner Field; Hattiesburg, MS	L 12–32	7,500	
October 25	Stephen F. Austin*	McNaspy Stadium; Lafayette, LA	L 19–20		
November 1	Louisiana Tech	McNaspy Stadium; Lafayette, LA (rivalry)	T 19–19		
November 8	at Louisiana College	Alumni Stadium; Pineville, LA	W 18–7		
November 14	at Northwestern State	Demon Stadium; Natchitoches, LA	W 34–0		
November 22	at McNeese State	Killen Field; Lake Charles, LA (rivalry)	W 20–13		
*Non-conference game
