= Southeastern Louisiana Lions football, 1950–1959 =

American college football seasons

The Southeastern Louisiana Lions football program, 1950–1959 represented Southeastern Louisiana College (now known as Southeastern Louisiana University) as a member of the Gulf States Conference (GSC) during the decade of the 1950s. During this time, the Lions were led by two different head coaches and had an overall record for the decade of 53–34–3 During this decade, the Lions played their home games on campus at Strawberry Stadium in Hammond, Louisiana.

Ned McGehee lead the Lions for their 1950 season to a 6–4 record. He resigned in May 1951 to focus solely on his duties as athletic director and was succeeded by Stan Galloway. Galloway served as head coach for the remainder of the decade and led Southeastern to an overall record of 47–30. During this period, he led the Lions to at least a share of four Gulf States Conference championships, including an undefeated season in 1954.

== 1950 ==
1950 Southeastern Louisiana Lions football
- Conference: Gulf States Conference
- Record: 6–4 (2–3 GSC)
- Head coach: Ned McGehee (5th season)
- Home stadium: Strawberry Stadium

1950 Gulf States Conference football standings
	Conf.					Overall
Team	W		L		T	W		L		T
Mississippi Southern $	3	–	1	–	0	5	–	5	–	0
Louisiana Tech	3	–	2	–	0	5	–	4	–	1
Louisiana College	2	–	2	–	0	5	–	5	–	0
Northwestern State	2	–	3	–	0	6	–	4	–	0
Southeastern Louisiana	2	–	3	–	0	6	–	4	–	0
Southwestern Louisiana	2	–	3	–	0	5	–	4	–	0
$ – Conference champion

The 1950 Southeastern Louisiana Lions football team was an American football team that represented Southeastern Louisiana College (now known as Southeastern Louisiana University) as a member of the Gulf States Conference (GSC) during the 1950 college football season. In their fifth year under head coach Ned McGehee, the team compiled an overall record of 6–4 with a mark of 2–3 in conference play, and finished tied for fourth in the GSC. Southeastern Louisiana played their home games on campus at Strawberry Stadium in Hammond, Louisiana.

In May 1951 McGehee resigned as head coach to focus solely on serving as athletic director. He ramained as athletic director at Southeastern until his retirement in June 1971.

Schedule

Date	Opponent	Site	Result	Attendance	Source
September 16	at Troy State*	Veterans Memorial Stadium; Troy, AL	W 18–7		
September 23	Louisiana College	Strawberry Stadium; Hammond, LA	L 13–14		
September 30	at Southwestern Louisiana	McNaspy Stadium; Lafayette, LA (rivalry)	L 0–6		
October 7	at Auburn*	Cliff Hare Stadium; Auburn, AL	W 6–0		
October 14	at Stephen F. Austin*	Memorial Stadium; Nacogdoches, TX	L 0–21		
October 21	Mississippi Southern	Strawberry Stadium; Hammond, LA	W 7–0	4,000	
October 28	Northwestern State^{†}	Strawberry Stadium; Hammond, LA (rivalry)	W 28–14		
November 4	at Pensacola Navy*	NAS Pensacola; Pensacola, FL	W 21–13		
November 11	at Louisiana Tech	Tech Stadium; Ruston, LA	L 0–14		
November 18	Delta State*	Strawberry Stadium; Hammond, LA	W 20–7		
*Non-conference game; ^{†}Homecoming

== 1951 ==
1951 Southeastern Louisiana Lions football
- Conference: Gulf States Conference
- Record: 7–3 (4–1 GSC)
- Head coach: Stan Galloway (1st season)
- Home stadium: Strawberry Stadium

1951 Gulf States Conference football standings
	Conf.					Overall
Team	W		L		T	W		L		T
Mississippi Southern $	4	–	0	–	0	6	–	5	–	0
Southeastern Louisiana	4	–	1	–	0	7	–	3	–	0
Southwestern Louisiana	3	–	2	–	0	6	–	4	–	0
Louisiana Tech	2	–	3	–	0	4	–	5	–	0
Louisiana College	1	–	3	–	0	5	–	6	–	0
Northwestern State	0	–	5	–	0	1	–	8	–	0
$ – Conference champion

The 1951 Southeastern Louisiana Lions football team was an American football team that represented Southeastern Louisiana College (now known as Southeastern Louisiana University) as a member of the Gulf States Conference (GSC) during the 1951 college football season. In their first year under head coach Stan Galloway, the team compiled an overall record of 7–3 with a mark of 4–1 in conference play, and finished second in the GSC. Southeastern Louisiana played their home games on campus at Strawberry Stadium in Hammond, Louisiana.

Galloway was named as head coach at Southeastern in May 1951 as the successor to Ned McGehee. Galloway was hired from Bogalusa High School where he had served as head coach from 1942 to 1950.

Schedule

Date	Opponent	Site	Result	Attendance	Source
September 22	at Northeast Louisiana State*	Brown Stadium; Monroe, LA	W 33–0	3,500	
September 29	Southwestern Louisiana	Strawberry Stadium; Hammond, LA (rivalry)	W 14–0		
October 6	at Louisiana College	Alumni Field; Pineville, LA	W 7–6		
October 13	Stephen F. Austin*	Strawberry Stadium; Hammond, LA	L 6–14		
October 20	at Mississippi Southern	Faulkner Field; Hattiesburg, MS	L 6–35		
October 27	at Northwestern State	Demon Stadium; Natchitoches, LA (rivalry)	W 33–14		
November 2	Troy State*	Strawberry Stadium; Hammond, LA	W 71–0		
November 10	Louisiana Tech	Strawberry Stadium; Hammond, LA	W 19–7	6,000	
November 17	at McNeese State*	Killen Field; Lake Charles, LA	W 9–6		
November 24	at Tulane*	Tulane Stadium; New Orleans, LA	L 7–48		
*Non-conference game

== 1952 ==
1952 Southeastern Louisiana Lions football

GSC co-champion
- Conference: Gulf States Conference
- Record: 6–1–2 (3–0–2 GSC)
- Head coach: Stan Galloway (2nd season)
- Home stadium: Strawberry Stadium

1952 Gulf States Conference football standings
	Conf.					Overall
Team	W		L		T	W		L		T
Louisiana Tech +	3	–	0	–	2	6	–	1	–	2
Southeastern Louisiana +	3	–	0	–	2	6	–	1	–	2
Southwestern Louisiana +	3	–	0	–	2	5	–	2	–	2
McNeese State	2	–	3	–	0	7	–	3	–	0
Louisiana College	0	–	4	–	1	3	–	7	–	1
Northwestern State	0	–	4	–	1	1	–	7	–	1
+ – Conference co-champions

The 1952 Southeastern Louisiana Lions football team was an American football team that represented Southeastern Louisiana College (now known as Southeastern Louisiana University) as a member of the Gulf States Conference (GSC) during the 1952 college football season. In their second year under head coach Stan Galloway, the team compiled an overall record of 6–1–2 with a mark of 3–0–2 in conference play, and finished as GSC co-champion. Southeastern Louisiana played their home games on campus at Strawberry Stadium in Hammond, Louisiana.

Schedule

Date	Opponent	Site	Result	Source
September 20	Northeast Louisiana State*	Strawberry Stadium; Hammond, LA	W 21–20	
September 27	at Southwestern Louisiana	McNaspy Stadium; Lafayette, LA (rivalry)	T 13–13	
October 4	Louisiana College	Strawberry Stadium; Hammond, LA	W 7–0	
October 11	at Stephen F. Austin*	Memorial Stadium; Nacogdoches, TX	W 21–7	
October 18	Mississippi Southern*	Strawberry Stadium; Hammond, LA	L 12–20	
October 25	Northwestern State^{†}	Strawberry Stadium; Hammond, LA (rivalry)	W 19–0	
November 8	at Louisiana Tech	Tech Stadium; Ruston, LA	T 7–7	
November 15	McNeese State	Strawberry Stadium; Hammond, LA	W 13–0	
November 22	at Memphis State*	Crump Stadium; Memphis, TN	W 28–25	
*Non-conference game; ^{†}Homecoming

== 1953 ==
1953 Southeastern Louisiana Lions football

GSC co-champion
- Conference: Gulf States Conference
- Record: 6–3 (5–1 GSC)
- Head coach: Stan Galloway (3rd season)
- Home stadium: Strawberry Stadium

1953 Gulf States Conference football standings
	Conf.					Overall
Team	W		L		T	W		L		T
Northwestern State +	5	–	1	–	0	6	–	2	–	0
Louisiana Tech +	5	–	1	–	0	6	–	3	–	0
Southeastern Louisiana +	5	–	1	–	0	6	–	3	–	0
Southwestern Louisiana	2	–	4	–	0	4	–	7	–	0
McNeese State	2	–	4	–	0	3	–	6	–	0
Louisiana College	1	–	5	–	0	4	–	6	–	0
Northeast Louisiana State	1	–	5	–	0	1	–	9	–	0
+ – Conference co-champions

The 1953 Southeastern Louisiana Lions football team was an American football team that represented Southeastern Louisiana College (now known as Southeastern Louisiana University) as a member of the Gulf States Conference (GSC) during the 1953 college football season. In their third year under head coach Stan Galloway, the team compiled an overall record of 6–3 with a mark of 5–1 in conference play, tying for first place in the GSC. Southeastern Louisiana played their home games on campus at Strawberry Stadium in Hammond, Louisiana.

Schedule

Date	Opponent	Site	Result	Attendance	Source
September 19	at Northeast Louisiana State	Brown Stadium; Monroe, LA	W 28–0		
September 26	Southwestern Louisiana	Strawberry Stadium; Hammond, LA (rivalry)	W 39–13		
October 3	at Louisiana College	Alumni Field; Pineville, LA	W 14–6		
October 10	at Stephen F. Austin*	Strawberry Stadium; Hammond, LA	W 35–0		
October 17	at No. 18 Mississippi Southern*	Faulkner Field; Hattiesburg, MS	L 0–7		
October 31	at Northwestern State	Demon Field; Natchitoches, LA (rivalry)	W 27–19		
November 7	Louisiana Tech^{†}	Strawberry Stadium; Hammond, LA	L 0–12		
November 14	at McNeese State	Killen Field; Lake Charles, LA	W 20–0	3,200	
November 22	Memphis State*	Strawberry Stadium; Hammond, LA	L 7–21		
*Non-conference game; ^{†}Homecoming; Rankings from AP Poll released prior to the game

== 1954 ==
1954 Southeastern Louisiana Lions football

GSC champion
- Conference: Gulf States Conference
- Record: 9–0 (6–0 GSC)
- Head coach: Stan Galloway (4th season)
- Home stadium: Strawberry Stadium

1954 Gulf States Conference football standings
	Conf.					Overall
Team	W		L		T	W		L		T
Southeastern Louisiana $	6	–	0	–	0	9	–	0	–	0
Northwestern State	4	–	2	–	0	7	–	2	–	0
Louisiana Tech	4	–	2	–	0	6	–	3	–	0
Southwestern Louisiana	4	–	2	–	0	5	–	4	–	0
Louisiana College	1	–	4	–	1	4	–	5	–	1
McNeese State	1	–	5	–	0	2	–	8	–	0
Northeast Louisiana State	0	–	5	–	1	1	–	8	–	1
$ – Conference champion

The 1954 Southeastern Louisiana Lions football team was an American football team that represented Southeastern Louisiana College (now known as Southeastern Louisiana University) as a member of the Gulf States Conference (GSC) during the 1954 college football season. In their fourth year under head coach Stan Galloway, the team compiled an overall record of 9–0 with a mark of 6–0 in conference play, and finished as GSC champion. Southeastern Louisiana played their home games on campus at Strawberry Stadium in Hammond, Louisiana.

Although they finished the season as an undefeated conference champion, Southeastern was not invited to participate in a bowl game.

Schedule

Date	Opponent	Site	Result	Attendance	Source
September 18	Northeast Louisiana State	Strawberry Stadium; Hammond, LA	W 58–0		
September 25	at Southwestern Louisiana	McNaspy Stadium; Lafayette, LA (rivalry)	W 32–0	6,000	
October 2	Louisiana College	Strawberry Stadium; Hammond, LA	W 46–0		
October 16	at Mississippi Southern*	Faulkner Field; Hattiesburg, MS	W 13–7		
October 23	at Arkansas State*	Kays Stadium; Jonesboro, AR	W 51–0		
October 30	at Stetson*	DeLand Municipal Stadium; DeLand, FL	W 62–0		
November 6	at Louisiana Tech	Tech Stadium; Ruston, LA	W 35–24		
November 13	McNeese State	Strawberry Stadium; Hammond, LA	W 50–6	6,500	
November 20	Northwestern State^{†}	Strawberry Stadium; Hammond, LA (rivalry)	W 32–6	10,000	
*Non-conference game; ^{†}Homecoming

== 1955 ==
1955 Southeastern Louisiana Lions football
- Conference: Gulf States Conference
- Record: 5–5 (4–2 GSC)
- Head coach: Stan Galloway (5th season)
- Home stadium: Strawberry Stadium

1955 Gulf States Conference football standings
	Conf.					Overall
Team	W		L		T	W		L		T
Louisiana Tech $	6	–	0	–	0	9	–	1	–	0
McNeese State	5	–	1	–	0	7	–	1	–	1
Southeastern Louisiana	4	–	2	–	0	5	–	5	–	0
Southwestern Louisiana	3	–	3	–	0	5	–	4	–	0
Northwestern State	2	–	4	–	0	4	–	5	–	0
Northeast Louisiana State	1	–	5	–	0	4	–	6	–	0
Louisiana College	0	–	6	–	0	2	–	8	–	0
$ – Conference champion

The 1955 Southeastern Louisiana Lions football team was an American football team that represented Southeastern Louisiana College (now known as Southeastern Louisiana University) as a member of the Gulf States Conference (GSC) during the 1955 college football season. In their fifth year under head coach Stan Galloway, the team compiled an overall record of 5–5 with a mark of 4–2 in conference play, and finished third in the GSC. Southeastern Louisiana played their home games on campus at Strawberry Stadium in Hammond, Louisiana.

Schedule

Date	Opponent	Site	Result	Attendance	Source
September 17	at Northeast Louisiana State	Brown Stadium; Monroe, LA	W 40–0		
September 24	Southwestern Louisiana	Strawberry Stadium; Hammond, LA (rivalry)	W 20–0		
October 1	at Louisiana College	Alumni Field; Pineville, LA	W 27–7		
October 8	at Tampa*	Phillips Field; Tampa, FL	W 13–7		
October 15	Mississippi Southern*	Strawberry Stadium; Hammond, LA	L 0–33	8,000	
October 22	Arkansas State*	Strawberry Stadium; Hammond, LA	L 12–21		
October 29	Trinity (TX)*	Strawberry Stadium; Hammond, LA	L 7–46		
November 5	Louisiana Tech^{†}	Strawberry Stadium; Hammond, LA	L 0–21		
November 12	at McNeese State	Wildcat Stadium; Lake Charles, LA	L 7–10		
November 19	at Northwestern State	Demon Stadium; Natchitoches, LA (rivalry)	W 27–20		
*Non-conference game; ^{†}Homecoming

== 1956 ==
1956 Southeastern Louisiana Lions football

GSC champion
- Conference: Gulf States Conference
- Record: 6–3 (4–1 GSC)
- Head coach: Stan Galloway (6th season)
- Home stadium: Strawberry Stadium

1956 Gulf States Conference football standings
	Conf.					Overall
Team	W		L		T	W		L		T
Southeastern Louisiana $	4	–	1	–	0	6	–	3	–	0
Northwestern State	3	–	1	–	1	6	–	2	–	2
Louisiana Tech	3	–	1	–	1	4	–	3	–	2
Northeast Louisiana State	2	–	3	–	0	7	–	3	–	0
McNeese State	2	–	3	–	0	5	–	5	–	0
Southwestern Louisiana	1	–	4	–	0	4	–	6	–	0
$ – Conference champion

The 1956 Southeastern Louisiana Lions football team was an American football team that represented Southeastern Louisiana College (now known as Southeastern Louisiana University) as a member of the Gulf States Conference (GSC) during the 1956 college football season. In their sixth year under head coach Stan Galloway, the team compiled an overall record of 6–3 with a mark of 4–1 in conference play, and finished as GSC champion. Southeastern Louisiana played their home games on campus at Strawberry Stadium in Hammond, Louisiana.

Schedule

Date	Opponent	Site	Result	Attendance	Source
September 15	Northeast Louisiana State	Strawberry Stadium; Hammond, LA	W 35–0		
September 22	at Southwestern Louisiana	McNaspy Stadium; Lafayette, LA (rivalry)	W 42–0		
September 29	Louisiana College*	Strawberry Stadium; Hammond, LA	W 20–0		
October 6	Tampa*	Strawberry Stadium; Hammond, LA	W 40–6		
October 13	at Mississippi Southern*	Faulkner Field; Hattiesburg, MS	L 14–21	12,500	
October 27	at Trinity (TX)*	Alamo Stadium; San Antonio, TX	L 7–14	5,175	
November 3	at Louisiana Tech	Tech Stadium; Ruston, LA	L 6–12	7,000	
November 10	McNeese State	Strawberry Stadium; Hammond, LA	W 34–0		
November 17	Northwestern State^{†}	Strawberry Stadium; Hammond, LA (rivalry)	W 20–15		
*Non-conference game; ^{†}Homecoming

== 1957 ==
1957 Southeastern Louisiana Lions football
- Conference: Gulf States Conference
- Record: 2–6–1 (1–3–1 GSC)
- Head coach: Stan Galloway (7th season)
- Home stadium: Strawberry Stadium

1957 Gulf States Conference football standings
	Conf.					Overall
Team	W		L		T	W		L		T
McNeese State +	4	–	1	–	0	8	–	2	–	0
Northwestern State +	4	–	1	–	0	7	–	2	–	0
Louisiana Tech +	4	–	1	–	0	6	–	4	–	0
Southwestern Louisiana	1	–	3	–	1	4	–	5	–	1
Southeastern Louisiana	1	–	3	–	1	2	–	6	–	1
Northeast Louisiana State	0	–	5	–	0	2	–	6	–	0
+ – Conference co-champions

The 1957 Southeastern Louisiana Lions football team was an American football team that represented Southeastern Louisiana College (now known as Southeastern Louisiana University) as a member of the Gulf States Conference (GSC) during the 1957 college football season. In their seventh year under head coach Stan Galloway, the team compiled an overall record of 2–6–1 with a mark of 1–3–1 in conference play, and finished tied for fourth in the GSC. Southeastern Louisiana played their home games on campus at Strawberry Stadium in Hammond, Louisiana.

Schedule

Date	Opponent	Site	Result	Attendance	Source
September 21	Southwestern Louisiana	Strawberry Stadium; Hammond, LA (rivalry)	T 7–7		
September 28	East Texas State*	Strawberry Stadium; Hammond, LA	L 7–25		
October 12	Mississippi Southern*	Strawberry Stadium; Hammond, LA	L 0–14	5,000	
October 19	at Florence State*	Coffee Stadium; Florence, AL	W 21–19		
October 26	at Northeast Louisiana State	Brown Stadium; Monroe, LA	W 26–13		
November 2	at Tampa*	Phillips Field; Tampa, FL	L 13–33		
November 9	Louisiana Tech^{†}	Strawberry Stadium; Hammond, LA	L 14–21		
November 16	at McNeese State	Wildcat Stadium; Lake Charles, LA	L 0–26	4,500	
November 23	at Northwestern State	Demon Stadium; Natchitoches, LA (rivalry)	L 7–13		
*Non-conference game; ^{†}Homecoming

== 1958 ==
1958 Southeastern Louisiana Lions football
- Conference: Gulf States Conference
- Record: 4–5 (2–3 GSC)
- Head coach: Stan Galloway (8th season)
- Home stadium: Strawberry Stadium

1958 Gulf States Conference football standings
	Conf.					Overall
Team	W		L		T	W		L		T
Northwestern State +	4	–	1	–	0	8	–	2	–	0
Louisiana Tech +	4	–	1	–	0	7	–	3	–	0
Northeast Louisiana State	3	–	2	–	0	6	–	3	–	0
McNeese State	2	–	3	–	0	5	–	5	–	0
Southeastern Louisiana	2	–	3	–	0	4	–	5	–	0
Southwestern Louisiana	0	–	5	–	0	1	–	8	–	0
+ – Conference co-champions

The 1958 Southeastern Louisiana Lions football team was an American football team that represented Southeastern Louisiana College (now known as Southeastern Louisiana University) as a member of the Gulf States Conference (GSC) during the 1958 college football season. In their eighth year under head coach Stan Galloway, the team compiled an overall record of 4–5 with a mark of 2–3 in conference play, and finished tied for fourth in the GSC. Southeastern Louisiana played their home games on campus at Strawberry Stadium in Hammond, Louisiana.

Schedule

Date	Opponent	Site	Result	Attendance	Source
September 20	at Southwestern Louisiana	McNaspy Stadium; Lafayette, LA (rivalry)	W 14–6	5,200	
September 27	East Texas State*	Strawberry Stadium; Hammond, LA	L 20–35		
October 11	at No. 1 Mississippi Southern*	Faulkner Field; Hattiesburg, MS	L 6–33	9,500	
October 18	Florence State*	Strawberry Stadium; Hammond, LA	W 40–7		
October 25	Northeast Louisiana State	Strawberry Stadium; Hammond, LA	L 8–22	2,100	
November 8	at Louisiana Tech	Tech Stadium; Ruston, LA	L 6–10		
November 15	McNeese State^{†}	Strawberry Stadium; Hammond, LA	W 7–6		
November 22	Northwestern State	Strawberry Stadium; Hammond, LA (rivalry)	L 0–7	2,000	
November 29	at Tampa*	Phillips Field; Tampa, FL	W 19–0	3,500	
*Non-conference game; ^{†}Homecoming; Rankings from UPI Poll released prior to the game

== 1959 ==
1959 Southeastern Louisiana Lions football
- Conference: Gulf States Conference
- Record: 5–4 (3–2 GSC)
- Head coach: Stan Galloway (9th season)
- Home stadium: Strawberry Stadium

1959 Gulf States Conference football standings
	Conf.					Overall
Team	W		L		T	W		L		T
No. 7 Louisiana Tech $	5	–	0	–	0	9	–	1	–	0
McNeese State	2	–	3	–	0	6	–	3	–	0
Northwestern State	2	–	3	–	0	4	–	5	–	1
Southwestern Louisiana	2	–	3	–	0	4	–	5	–	0
Southeastern Louisiana	1	–	4	–	0	3	–	2	–	0
Northeast Louisiana State	1	–	4	–	0	2	–	8	–	0
$ – Conference champion; Rankings from NAIA poll

The 1959 Southeastern Louisiana Lions football team was an American football team that represented Southeastern Louisiana College (now known as Southeastern Louisiana University) as a member of the Gulf States Conference (GSC) during the 1959 college football season. In their ninth year under head coach Stan Galloway, the team compiled an overall record of 5–4 with a mark of 3–2 in conference play, and finished second in the GSC. Southeastern Louisiana played their home games on campus at Strawberry Stadium in Hammond, Louisiana.

Schedule

Date	Opponent	Site	Result	Attendance	Source
September 18	Southwestern Louisiana	Strawberry Stadium; Hammond, LA (rivalry)	W 18–13	6,000	
September 26	at East Texas State*	Memorial Stadium; Commerce, TX	L 10–21	5,500	
October 10	at No. 1 Mississippi Southern*	Faulkner Field; Hattiesburg, MS	L 6–26	12,200	
October 17	at Florence State*	Coffee Stadium; Florence, AL	W 28–21	6,000	
October 24	at Northeast Louisiana State	Brown Stadium; Monroe, LA	W 27–6	3,000	
October 31	vs. Tampa*	Tiger Stadium; Pensacola, FL	W 33–8	5,500	
November 7	No. 20 Louisiana Tech^{†}	Strawberry Stadium; Hammond, LA	L 0–14	6,000	
November 14	at McNeese State	Wildcat Stadium; Lake Charles, LA	L 8–20	1,500	
November 21	at Northwestern State	Demon Stadium; Natchitoches, LA (rivalry)	W 15–13	5,000	
*Non-conference game; ^{†}Homecoming; Rankings from UPI Poll released prior to the game
