= 1950 Southwestern Louisiana Bulldogs football team =

American college football season

1950 Southwestern Louisiana Bulldogs football
- Conference: Gulf States Conference
- Record: 5–4 (2–3 GSC)
- Head coach: A. L. Swanson (1st season)
- Home stadium: McNaspy Stadium

1950 Gulf States Conference football standings
	Conf.					Overall
Team	W		L		T	W		L		T
Mississippi Southern $	3	–	1	–	0	5	–	5	–	0
Louisiana Tech	3	–	2	–	0	5	–	4	–	1
Louisiana College	2	–	2	–	0	5	–	5	–	0
Northwestern State	2	–	3	–	0	6	–	4	–	0
Southeastern Louisiana	2	–	3	–	0	6	–	4	–	0
Southwestern Louisiana	2	–	3	–	0	5	–	4	–	0
$ – Conference champion

The 1950 Southwestern Louisiana Bulldogs football team was an American football team that represented the Southwestern Louisiana Institute of Liberal and Technical Learning (now known as the University of Louisiana at Lafayette) in the Gulf States Conference during the 1950 college football season. In their first year under head coach A. L. Swanson, the team compiled a 5–4 record.

== Schedule ==
Date	Opponent	Site	Result	Attendance	Source
September 23	East Texas Baptist*	McNaspy Stadium; Lafayette, LA	W 25–0		
September 30	Southeastern Louisiana	McNaspy Stadium; Lafayette, LA (rivalry)	W 6–0		
October 7	Troy State*	McNaspy Stadium; Lafayette, LA	W 40–14		
October 14	at Mississippi Southern	Faulkner Field; Hattiesburg, MS	L 0–6		
October 21	at Memphis State*	Crump Stadium; Memphis, TN	L 0–20		
October 28	Stephen F. Austin*	McNaspy Stadium; Lafayette, LA	W 20–13		
November 4	Louisiana Tech	McNaspy Stadium; Lafayette, LA (rivalry)	W 41–13		
November 11	at Louisiana College	Alumni Field; Pineville, LA	L 20–22	5,000	
November 18	at Northwestern State	Demon Stadium; Natchitoches, LA	L 7–12	4,000	
*Non-conference game
