= 1956 Northeast Louisiana State Indians football team =

American college football season

1956 Northeast Louisiana State Indians football
- Conference: Gulf States Conference
- Record: 8–2 (3–2 GSC)
- Head coach: Devone Payne (3rd season)
- Home stadium: Brown Stadium

1956 Gulf States Conference football standings
| | Conf. | | | | | Overall |
| Team | W | | L | | T | W | | L | | T |
|---|---|---|---|---|---|---|---|---|---|---|
| Southeastern Louisiana $ | 4 | – | 1 | – | 0 | 6 | – | 3 | – | 0 |
| Northwestern State | 3 | – | 1 | – | 1 | 6 | – | 2 | – | 2 |
| Louisiana Tech | 3 | – | 1 | – | 1 | 4 | – | 3 | – | 2 |
| Northeast Louisiana State | 2 | – | 3 | – | 0 | 7 | – | 3 | – | 0 |
| McNeese State | 2 | – | 3 | – | 0 | 5 | – | 5 | – | 0 |
| Southwestern Louisiana | 1 | – | 4 | – | 0 | 4 | – | 6 | – | 0 |
$ – Conference champion

The 1956 Northeast Louisiana State Indians football team was an American football team that represented Northeast Louisiana State College (now known as the University of Louisiana at Monroe) in the Gulf States Conference during the 1956 college football season. In their third year under head coach Devone Payne, the team compiled a 8–2 record. In October, McNeese State announced it would forfeit all Gulf States games after an ineligible player competed to start the season. This included their October 20 victory over the Indians.

== Schedule ==
| Date | Opponent | Site | Result | Source |
|---|---|---|---|---|
| September 15 | at Southeastern Louisiana | Strawberry Stadium; Hammond, LA | L 0–35 | |
| September 22 | Stephen F. Austin* | Brown Stadium; Monroe, LA | W 21–7 | |
| September 29 | at Delta State* | Delta Field; Cleveland, MS | W 20–12 | |
| October 6 | at Southwestern Louisiana | McNaspy Stadium; Lafayette, LA (rivalry) | W 45–19 | |
| October 13 | Southern State (AR)* | Brown Stadium; Monroe, LA | W 33–7 | |
| October 20 | at McNeese State | Wildcat Stadium; Lake Charles, LA | W 0–12 (forfeit victory) | |
| October 27 | Livingston State* | Brown Stadium; Monroe, LA | W 53–7 | |
| November 3 | Northwestern State | Brown Stadium; Monroe, LA (rivalry) | L 7–24 | |
| November 10 | at Louisiana College | Alumni Stadium; Pineville, LA | W 34–32 | |
| November 17 | Louisiana Tech | Brown Stadium; Monroe, LA (rivalry) | W 7–0 | |
*Non-conference game
