= 1950 Louisiana Tech Bulldogs football team =

American college football season

1950 Louisiana Tech Bulldogs football
- Conference: Gulf States Conference
- Record: 5–4–1 (3–2 GSC)
- Head coach: Joe Aillet (10th season)
- Captain: Leo Sanford
- Home stadium: Tech Stadium

1950 Gulf States Conference football standings
	Conf.					Overall
Team	W		L		T	W		L		T
Mississippi Southern $	3	–	1	–	0	5	–	5	–	0
Louisiana Tech	3	–	2	–	0	5	–	4	–	1
Louisiana College	2	–	2	–	0	5	–	5	–	0
Northwestern State	2	–	3	–	0	6	–	4	–	0
Southeastern Louisiana	2	–	3	–	0	6	–	4	–	0
Southwestern Louisiana	2	–	3	–	0	5	–	4	–	0
$ – Conference champion

The 1950 Louisiana Tech Bulldogs football team was an American football team that represented the Louisiana Polytechnic Institute (now known as Louisiana Tech University) as a member of the Gulf States Conference during the 1950 college football season. In their tenth year under head coach Joe Aillet, the team compiled a 5–4–1 record.

== Schedule ==
Date	Opponent	Site	Result	Attendance	Source
September 23	Howard Payne*	Tech Stadium; Ruston, LA	W 27–20	7,000	
September 30	at East Texas State*	Memorial Stadium; Commerce, TX	T 0–0		
October 7	Stephen F. Austin*	Tech Stadium; Ruston, LA	W 21–6		
October 14	at Xavier*	Xavier Stadium; Cincinnati, OH	L 21–35	9,500	
October 21	vs. Northwestern State	State Fair Stadium; Shreveport, LA (rivalry)	W 15–7	10,000	
October 28	Louisiana College	Tech Stadium; Ruston, LA	W 21–9		
November 4	at Southwestern Louisiana	McNaspy Stadium; Lafayette, LA (rivalry)	L 13–41		
November 11	Southeastern Louisiana	Tech Stadium; Ruston, LA	W 14–0		
November 18	at Mississippi Southern	Faulkner Field; Hattiesburg, MS (rivalry)	L 20–41		
December 1	Memphis State*	Tech Stadium; Ruston, LA	L 0–6		
*Non-conference game
