= 1956 McNeese State Cowboys football team =

American college football season

1956 McNeese State Cowboys football
- Conference: Gulf States Conference
- Record: 3–7 (0–5 GSC)
- Head coach: John Gregory (2nd season)
- Home stadium: Wildcat Stadium

1956 Gulf States Conference football standings
	Conf.					Overall
Team	W		L		T	W		L		T
Southeastern Louisiana $	4	–	1	–	0	6	–	3	–	0
Northwestern State	3	–	1	–	1	6	–	2	–	2
Louisiana Tech	3	–	1	–	1	4	–	3	–	2
Northeast Louisiana State	2	–	3	–	0	7	–	3	–	0
McNeese State	2	–	3	–	0	5	–	5	–	0
Southwestern Louisiana	1	–	4	–	0	4	–	6	–	0
$ – Conference champion

The 1956 McNeese State Cowboys football team was an American football team that represented McNeese State College (now known as McNeese State University) as a member of the Gulf States Conference (GSC) during the 1956 college football season. In their second year under head coach John Gregory, the team compiled an overall record of 3–7 with a mark of 0–5 in conference play, and finished sixth in the GSC. In October, McNeese announced it would forfeit all Gulf States games after an ineligible player competed to start the season.

== Schedule ==
Date	Opponent	Site	Result	Source
September 22	Southwestern State (OK)*	Wildcat Stadium; Lake Charles, LA	W 24–7	
September 29	at Northwestern State	Demon Stadium; Natchitoches, LA (rivalry)	L 20–13 (forfeit)	
October 6	at Louisiana Tech	Tech Stadium; Ruston, LA	L 0–6	
October 13	Louisiana College*	Wildcat Stadium; Lake Charles, LA	W 25–6	
October 20	Northeast Louisiana State	Wildcat Stadium; Lake Charles, LA	L 12–0 (forfeit)	
October 27	at Lamar Tech*	Greenie Stadium; Beaumont, TX (rivalry)	L 14–18	
November 3	at Sam Houston State*	Pritchett Field; Huntsville, TX	L 6–14	
November 10	at Southeastern Louisiana	Strawberry Stadium; Hammond, LA	L 0–34	
November 17	Southwestern Louisiana	Wildcat Stadium; Lake Charles, LA (rivalry)	L 33–35	
November 29	at Southern State (AR)*	Wilkins Stadium; Magnolia, AR	W 34–14	
*Non-conference game
