= 1951 Louisiana Tech Bulldogs football team =

American college football season

1951 Louisiana Tech Bulldogs football
- Conference: Gulf States Conference
- Record: 4–5 (2–3 GSC)
- Head coach: Joe Aillet (11th season)
- Captains: Gene Knecht; Gerald Mardis
- Home stadium: Tech Stadium

1951 Gulf States Conference football standings
	Conf.					Overall
Team	W		L		T	W		L		T
Mississippi Southern $	4	–	0	–	0	6	–	5	–	0
Southeastern Louisiana	4	–	1	–	0	7	–	3	–	0
Southwestern Louisiana	3	–	2	–	0	6	–	4	–	0
Louisiana Tech	2	–	3	–	0	4	–	5	–	0
Louisiana College	1	–	3	–	0	5	–	6	–	0
Northwestern State	0	–	5	–	0	1	–	8	–	0
$ – Conference champion

The 1951 Louisiana Tech Bulldogs football team was an American football team that represented the Louisiana Polytechnic Institute (now known as Louisiana Tech University) as a member of the Gulf States Conference during the 1951 college football season. In their eleventh year under head coach Joe Aillet, the team compiled a 4–5 record.

== Schedule ==
Date	Opponent	Site	Result	Attendance	Source
September 22	at Howard Payne*	Lion Stadium; Brownwood, TX	W 34–27		
September 29	East Texas State*	Tech Stadium; Ruston, LA	L 7–27		
October 6	at Memphis State*	Crump Stadium; Memphis, TN	L 14–26	4,248	
October 13	Southeastern Oklahoma State*	Tech Stadium; Ruston, LA	W 40–6		
October 20	vs. Northwestern State	State Fair Stadium; Shreveport, LA (rivalry)	W 21–6		
October 27	at Louisiana College	Alumni Field; Pineville, LA	W 20–14	5,000	
November 3	Southwestern Louisiana^{†}	Tech Stadium; Ruston, LA (rivalry)	L 7–34	6,000	
November 10	at Southeastern Louisiana	Strawberry Stadium; Hammond, LA	L 7–19	6,000	
November 17	Mississippi Southern	Tech Stadium; Ruston, LA (rivalry)	L 7–33		
*Non-conference game; ^{†}Homecoming
