= 1956 Louisiana Tech Bulldogs football team =

American college football season

1956 Louisiana Tech Bulldogs football
- Conference: Gulf States Conference
- Record: 4–3–2 (3–1–1 GSC)
- Head coach: Joe Aillet (16th season)
- Captains: Charles Glover; Pat Hinton; A. L. Williams
- Home stadium: Tech Stadium

1956 Gulf States Conference football standings
	Conf.					Overall
Team	W		L		T	W		L		T
Southeastern Louisiana $	4	–	1	–	0	6	–	3	–	0
Northwestern State	3	–	1	–	1	6	–	2	–	2
Louisiana Tech	3	–	1	–	1	4	–	3	–	2
Northeast Louisiana State	2	–	3	–	0	7	–	3	–	0
McNeese State	2	–	3	–	0	5	–	5	–	0
Southwestern Louisiana	1	–	4	–	0	4	–	6	–	0
$ – Conference champion

The 1956 Louisiana Tech Bulldogs football team was an American football team that represented the Louisiana Polytechnic Institute (now known as Louisiana Tech University) as a member of the Gulf States Conference during the 1956 college football season. In their 16th year under head coach Joe Aillet, the team compiled a 4–3–2 record.

== Schedule ==
Date	Opponent	Site	Result	Attendance	Source
September 15	Louisiana College*	Tech Stadium; Ruston, LA	T 0–0		
September 22	at Mississippi Southern*	Faulkner Field; Hattiesburg, MS (rivalry)	L 0–14	10,000	
September 29	Stephen F. Austin*	Tech Stadium; Ruston, LA	W 37–14		
October 6	McNeese State	Tech Stadium; Ruston, LA	W 6–0		
October 13	at Arkansas State*	Kays Stadium; Jonesboro, AR	L 13–21		
October 20	vs. Northwestern State	State Fair Stadium; Shreveport, LA (rivalry)	T 0–0		
October 27	at Southwestern Louisiana	McNaspy Stadium; Lafayette, LA (rivalry)	W 33–6	7,500	
November 3	Southeastern Louisiana^{†}	Tech Stadium; Ruston, LA	W 12–6	7,000	
November 17	at Northeast Louisiana State	Brown Stadium; Monroe, LA (rivalry)	L 0–7		
*Non-conference game; ^{†}Homecoming
