= Northwestern State Demons football, 1950–1959 =

American college football seasons

The Northwestern State Demons football program, 1950–1959 represented Northwestern State College of Louisiana (now known as Northwestern State University) as a member of the Gulf States Conference (GSC) during the decade of the 1950s. During this time, the Demons were led by four different head coaches and had an overall record for the decade of 50–39–4. During this decade, the Demons played their home games on campus at Demon Stadium in Natchitoches, Louisiana.

Harry Turpin had served as head coach for the Demons since 1934, and remained in this position through the 1956 season. He led Northwestern State to a share of the GSC championship in 1953. After the sixth game of the 1956 season, Turpin resigned as head coach immegiately, citing on-going health issues. His record during the 1950s was 28–29–3. At the time of his resignation, H. Alvin Brown and Walter Ledet were named as co-head coaches for the remainder of the season and compiled an overall record of 3–1.

In January 1957, Jack Clayton was hired as head coach at Northwestern State. To finish the decade, Clayton led the Demons to a share of the GSC championship in both 1957 and 1958 and an overall record of 19–9–1.

== 1950 ==
1950 Northwestern State Demons football
- Conference: Gulf States Conference
- Record: 6–4 (2–3 GSC)
- Head coach: Harry Turpin (16th season)
- Home stadium: Demon Stadium

1950 Gulf States Conference football standings
	Conf.					Overall
Team	W		L		T	W		L		T
Mississippi Southern $	3	–	1	–	0	5	–	5	–	0
Louisiana Tech	3	–	2	–	0	5	–	4	–	1
Louisiana College	2	–	2	–	0	5	–	5	–	0
Northwestern State	2	–	3	–	0	6	–	4	–	0
Southeastern Louisiana	2	–	3	–	0	6	–	4	–	0
Southwestern Louisiana	2	–	3	–	0	5	–	4	–	0
$ – Conference champion

The 1950 Northwestern State Demons football team was an American football team that represented Northwestern State College of Louisiana (now known as Northwestern State University) as a member of the Gulf States Conference (GSC) during the 1950 college football season. In their 16th year under head coach Harry Turpin, the team compiled an overall record of 6–4 with a mark of 2–3 in conference play, and finished tied for fourth in the GSC. Northwestern State played their home games on campus at Demon Stadium in Natchitoches, Louisiana.

Schedule

Date	Opponent	Site	Result	Attendance	Source
September 23	Central State (OK)*	Demon Stadium; Natchitoches, LA	L 41–20		
September 30	Maryville (MO)*	Demon Stadium; Natchitoches, LA	W 53–0		
October 6	vs. Lamar Tech*	Yellow Jacket Stadium; Port Arthur, TX	W 26–0		
October 14	vs. Louisiana College	Bolton Stadium; Alexandria, LA	W 12–10		
October 21	vs. Louisiana Tech	State Fair Stadium; Shreveport, LA (rivalry)	L 7–15	10,000	
October 28	at Southeastern Louisiana	Strawberry Stadium; Hammond, LA (rivalry)	L 14–28		
November 5	Mississippi Southern	Demon Stadium; Natchitoches, LA	L 0–7		
November 11	vs. Livingston State*	Ladd Memorial Stadium; Mobile, AL	L 20–8	3,000	
November 18	Southwestern Louisiana^{†}	Demon Stadium; Natchitoches, LA	W 12–7	4,000	
November 23	East Texas Baptist*	Demon Stadium; Natchitoches, LA	W 34–6	3,000	
*Non-conference game; ^{†}Homecoming

== 1951 ==
1951 Northwestern State Demons football
- Conference: Gulf States Conference
- Record: 1–8 (0–5 GSC)
- Head coach: Harry Turpin (17th season)
- Home stadium: Demon Stadium

1951 Gulf States Conference football standings
	Conf.					Overall
Team	W		L		T	W		L		T
Mississippi Southern $	4	–	0	–	0	6	–	5	–	0
Southeastern Louisiana	4	–	1	–	0	7	–	3	–	0
Southwestern Louisiana	3	–	2	–	0	6	–	4	–	0
Louisiana Tech	2	–	3	–	0	4	–	5	–	0
Louisiana College	1	–	3	–	0	5	–	6	–	0
Northwestern State	0	–	5	–	0	1	–	8	–	0
$ – Conference champion

The 1951 Northwestern State Demons football team was an American football team that represented Northwestern State College of Louisiana (now known as Northwestern State University) as a member of the Gulf States Conference (GSC) during the 1951 college football season. In their 17th year under head coach Harry Turpin, the team compiled an overall record of 1–8 with a mark of 0–5 in conference play, and finished sixth in the GSC. Northwestern State played their home games on campus at Demon Stadium in Natchitoches, Louisiana.

Schedule

Date	Opponent	Site	Result	Attendance	Source
September 22	Central State (OK)*	Demon Stadium; Natchitoches, LA	W 19–6		
September 29	Lamar Tech*	Demon Stadium; Natchitoches, LA	L 20–32		
October 6	at McNeese State*	Killen Field; Lake Charles, LA (rivalry)	L 21–38		
October 13	vs. Louisiana College	Bolton Stadium; Alexandria, LA	L 6–27	7,500	
October 20	vs. Louisiana Tech	State Fair Stadium; Shreveport, LA (rivalry)	L 6–21		
October 27	Southeastern Louisiana	Demon Stadium; Natchitoches, LA (rivalry)	L 14–33		
November 3	at Mississippi Southern	Faulkner Field; Hattiesburg, MS	L 0–76	6,500	
November 11	Livingston State*	Demon Stadium; Natchitoches, LA	L 27–34		
November 17	at Southwestern Louisiana	McNaspy Stadium; Lafayette, LA	L 26–41	6,000	
*Non-conference game

== 1952 ==
1952 Northwestern State Demons football
- Conference: Gulf States Conference
- Record: 1–7–1 (0–4–1 GSC)
- Head coach: Harry Turpin (18th season)
- Home stadium: Demon Stadium

1952 Gulf States Conference football standings
	Conf.					Overall
Team	W		L		T	W		L		T
Louisiana Tech +	3	–	0	–	2	6	–	1	–	2
Southeastern Louisiana +	3	–	0	–	2	6	–	1	–	2
Southwestern Louisiana +	3	–	0	–	2	5	–	2	–	2
McNeese State	2	–	3	–	0	7	–	3	–	0
Louisiana College	0	–	4	–	1	3	–	7	–	1
Northwestern State	0	–	4	–	1	1	–	7	–	1
+ – Conference co-champions

The 1952 Northwestern State Demons football team was an American football team that represented Northwestern State College of Louisiana (now known as Northwestern State University) as a member of the Gulf States Conference (GSC) during the 1952 college football season. In their 18th year under head coach Harry Turpin, the team compiled an overall record of 1–7–1 with a mark of 0–4–1 in conference play, and finished tied for fifth in the GSC. Northwestern State played their home games on campus at Demon Stadium in Natchitoches, Louisiana.

Schedule

Date	Opponent	Site	Result	Attendance	Source
September 20	Central State (OK)*	Demon Stadium; Natchitoches, LA	W 6–0		
September 27	at Lamar Tech*	Greenie Stadium; Beaumont, TX	L 13–35	6,000	
October 4	McNeese State	Demon Stadium; Natchitoches, LA (rivalry)	L 12–32		
October 11	vs. Louisiana College	Bolton Stadium; Alexandria, LA	T 0–0		
October 18	vs. Louisiana Tech	State Fair Stadium; Shreveport, LA (rivalry)	L 0–22		
October 25	at Southeastern Louisiana	Strawberry Stadium; Hammond, LA (rivalry)	L 0–19		
November 1	Mississippi Southern*	Demon Stadium; Natchitoches, LA	L 13–39		
November 8	at Northeast Louisiana State*	Brown Stadium; Monroe, LA	L 14–20		
November 14	Southwestern Louisiana	Demon Stadium; Natchitoches, LA	L 0–34		
*Non-conference game

== 1953 ==
1953 Northwestern State Demons football

GSC co-champion
- Conference: Gulf States Conference
- Record: 6–2 (5–1 GSC)
- Head coach: Harry Turpin (19th season)
- Home stadium: Demon Stadium

1953 Gulf States Conference football standings
	Conf.					Overall
Team	W		L		T	W		L		T
Northwestern State +	5	–	1	–	0	6	–	2	–	0
Louisiana Tech +	5	–	1	–	0	6	–	3	–	0
Southeastern Louisiana +	5	–	1	–	0	6	–	3	–	0
Southwestern Louisiana	2	–	4	–	0	4	–	7	–	0
McNeese State	2	–	4	–	0	3	–	6	–	0
Louisiana College	1	–	5	–	0	4	–	6	–	0
Northeast Louisiana State	1	–	5	–	0	1	–	9	–	0
+ – Conference co-champions

The 1953 Northwestern State Demons football team was an American football team that represented Northwestern State College of Louisiana (now known as Northwestern State University) as a member of the Gulf States Conference (GSC) during the 1953 college football season. In their 19th year under head coach Harry Turpin, the team compiled an overall record of 6–2 record with a mark of 5–1 in conference play, sharing the GSC title with Louisiana Tech and Southeastern Louisiana. Northwestern State played their home games on campus at Demon Stadium in Natchitoches, Louisiana.

Schedule

Date	Opponent	Site	Result	Attendance	Source
September 19	Central State (OK)*	Demon Stadium; Natchitoches, LA	L 0–7		
September 26	Lamar Tech*	Demon Stadium; Natchitoches, LA	W 12–6		
October 3	at McNeese State	Killen Field; Lake Charles, LA (rivalry)	W 20–6	5,000	
October 10	vs. Louisiana College	Bolton Stadium; Alexandria, LA	W 9–7	8,500	
October 24	vs. Louisiana Tech	State Fair Stadium; Shreveport, LA (rivalry)	W 15–7	7,000	
October 31	Southeastern Louisiana	Demon Stadium; Natchitoches, LA (rivalry)	L 19–27		
November 7	Northeast Louisiana State^{†}	Demon Stadium; Natchitoches, LA	W 7–0		
November 14	at Southwestern Louisiana	McNaspy Stadium; Lafayette, LA	W 12–7		
*Non-conference game; ^{†}Homecoming

== 1954 ==
1954 Northwestern State Demons football
- Conference: Gulf States Conference
- Record: 7–2 (4–2 GSC)
- Head coach: Harry Turpin (20th season)
- Home stadium: Demon Stadium

1954 Gulf States Conference football standings
	Conf.					Overall
Team	W		L		T	W		L		T
Southeastern Louisiana $	6	–	0	–	0	9	–	0	–	0
Northwestern State	4	–	2	–	0	7	–	2	–	0
Louisiana Tech	4	–	2	–	0	6	–	3	–	0
Southwestern Louisiana	4	–	2	–	0	5	–	4	–	0
Louisiana College	1	–	4	–	1	4	–	5	–	1
McNeese State	1	–	5	–	0	2	–	8	–	0
Northeast Louisiana State	0	–	5	–	1	1	–	8	–	1
$ – Conference champion

The 1954 Northwestern State Demons football team was an American football team that represented Northwestern State College of Louisiana (now known as Northwestern State University) as a member of the Gulf States Conference (GSC) during the 1954 college football season. In their 20th year under head coach Harry Turpin, the team compiled an overall record of 7–2 with a mark of 4–2 in conference play, and finished tied for second in the GSC. Northwestern State played their home games on campus at Demon Stadium in Natchitoches, Louisiana.

Schedule

Date	Opponent	Site	Result	Attendance	Source
September 18	Central State (OK)*	Demon Stadium; Natchitoches, LA	W 15–6		
September 25	at Lamar Tech*	Greenie Stadium; Beaumont, TX	W 22–13		
October 2	McNeese State	Demon Stadium; Natchitoches, LA (rivalry)	W 32–20	7,500	
October 9	vs. Louisiana College	Bolton Stadium; Alexandria, LA	W 6–0	5,000	
October 16	Southeastern State (OK)*	Demon Stadium; Natchitoches, LA	W 38–0	4,000	
October 23	vs. Louisiana Tech	State Fair Stadium; Shreveport, LA (rivalry)	L 6–13		
November 6	at Northeast Louisiana State	Brown Stadium; Monroe, LA	W 51–6		
November 13	Southwestern Louisiana	Demon Stadium; Natchitoches, LA	W 34–7		
November 20	at Southeastern Louisiana	Strawberry Stadium; Hammond, LA (rivalry)	L 6–32	10,000	
*Non-conference game

== 1955 ==
1955 Northwestern State Demons football
- Conference: Gulf States Conference
- Record: 4–5 (2–4 GSC)
- Head coach: Harry Turpin (21st season)
- Home stadium: Demon Stadium

1955 Gulf States Conference football standings
	Conf.					Overall
Team	W		L		T	W		L		T
Louisiana Tech $	6	–	0	–	0	9	–	1	–	0
McNeese State	5	–	1	–	0	7	–	1	–	1
Southeastern Louisiana	4	–	2	–	0	5	–	5	–	0
Southwestern Louisiana	3	–	3	–	0	5	–	4	–	0
Northwestern State	2	–	4	–	0	4	–	5	–	0
Northeast Louisiana State	1	–	5	–	0	4	–	6	–	0
Louisiana College	0	–	6	–	0	2	–	8	–	0
$ – Conference champion

The 1955 Northwestern State Demons football team was an American football team that represented Northwestern State College of Louisiana (now known as Northwestern State University) as a member of the Gulf States Conference (GSC) during the 1955 college football season. In their 21st year under head coach Harry Turpin, the team compiled an overall record of 4–5 with a mark of 2–4 in conference play, and finished tied for fifth in the GSC. Northwestern State played their home games on campus at Demon Stadium in Natchitoches, Louisiana.

Schedule

Date	Opponent	Site	Result	Attendance	Source
September 17	Stetson*	Demon Stadium; Natchitoches, LA	W 7–0		
September 24	Lamar Tech*	Demon Stadium; Natchitoches, LA	W 7–6		
October 1	at McNeese State	Wildcat Stadium; Lake Charles, LA (rivalry)	L 6–14		
October 8	vs. Louisiana College	Bolton Stadium; Alexandria, LA	W 34–7	2,000	
October 22	vs. Louisiana Tech	State Fair Stadium; Shreveport, LA (rivalry)	L 20–21		
October 29	at Howard Payne*	Lion Stadium; Brownwood, TX	L 7–12		
November 5	Northeast Louisiana State	Demon Stadium; Natchitoches, LA	W 28–7		
November 12	at Southwestern Louisiana	McNaspy Stadium; Lafayette, LA	L 13–27		
November 19	Southeastern Louisiana^{†}	Demon Stadium; Natchitoches, LA (rivalry)	L 20–27		
*Non-conference game; ^{†}Homecoming

== 1956 ==
1956 Northwestern State Demons football
- Conference: Gulf States Conference
- Record: 6–2–2 (3–1–1 GSC)
- Head coach: Harry Turpin (22nd season; Games 1–6); H. Alvin Brown and Walter Ledet (Games 7–10)
- Home stadium: Demon Stadium

1956 Gulf States Conference football standings
	Conf.					Overall
Team	W		L		T	W		L		T
Southeastern Louisiana $	4	–	1	–	0	6	–	3	–	0
Northwestern State	3	–	1	–	1	6	–	2	–	2
Louisiana Tech	3	–	1	–	1	4	–	3	–	2
Northeast Louisiana State	2	–	3	–	0	7	–	3	–	0
McNeese State	2	–	3	–	0	5	–	5	–	0
Southwestern Louisiana	1	–	4	–	0	4	–	6	–	0
$ – Conference champion

The 1956 Northwestern State Demons football team was an American football team that represented Northwestern State College of Louisiana (now known as Northwestern State University) as a member of the Gulf States Conference (GSC) during the 1956 college football season. In their 22nd year under head coach Harry Turpin, the team compiled an overall record of 6–2–2 with a mark of 3–1–1 in conference play, and finished tied for second in the GSC. Northwestern State played their home games on campus at Demon Stadium in Natchitoches, Louisiana.

After he led the Demons to a 3–1–2 record through their first six games, Turpin resigned as head coach and cited ongoing health-related issues as the reason for his resignation. At the time of his resignation, the school announced H. Alvin Brown and Walter Ledet would serve as co-head cpached for the final four games of the season. Under the leadership of Brown and Ledet, the Demons complied an overall record of 3–1 to finish the season.

Schedule

Date	Opponent	Site	Result	Attendance	Source
September 15	at Stephen F. Austin*	Memorial Stadium; Nacogdoches, TX (rivalry)	L 12–14		
September 22	at Lamar Tech*	Greenie Stadium; Beaumont, TX	T 6–6	5,000	
September 29	McNeese State	Demon Stadium; Natchitoches, LA (rivalry)	W 13–20 (forfeit)		
October 6	Louisiana College*	Demon Stadium; Natchitoches, LA	W 18–7		
October 12	at Stetson*	Municipal Stadium; DeLand, FL	W 13–7	1,000	
October 20	vs. Louisiana Tech	State Fair Stadium; Shreveport, LA (rivalry)	T 0–0		
October 27	Howard Payne*	Demon Stadium; Natchitoches, LA	W 18–6		
November 3	at Northeast Louisiana State	Brown Stadium; Monroe, LA	W 24–7		
November 10	Southwestern Louisiana	Demon Stadium; Natchitoches, LA	W 38–19		
November 17	at Southeastern Louisiana	Strawberry Stadium; Hammond, LA (rivalry)	L 15–20		
*Non-conference game

== 1957 ==
1957 Northwestern State Demons football

GSC co-champion
- Conference: Gulf States Conference
- Record: 7–2 (4–1 GSC)
- Head coach: Jack Clayton (1st season)
- Home stadium: Demon Stadium

1957 Gulf States Conference football standings
	Conf.					Overall
Team	W		L		T	W		L		T
McNeese State +	4	–	1	–	0	8	–	2	–	0
Northwestern State +	4	–	1	–	0	7	–	2	–	0
Louisiana Tech +	4	–	1	–	0	6	–	4	–	0
Southwestern Louisiana	1	–	3	–	1	4	–	5	–	1
Southeastern Louisiana	1	–	3	–	1	2	–	6	–	1
Northeast Louisiana State	0	–	5	–	0	2	–	6	–	0
+ – Conference co-champions

The 1957 Northwestern State Demons football team was an American football team that represented Northwestern State College of Louisiana (now known as Northwestern State University) as a member of the Gulf States Conference (GSC) during the 1957 college football season. In their first year under head coach Jack Clayton, the team compiled an overall record of 7–2 with a mark of 4–1 in conference play, and finished as GSC co-champion. Northwestern State played their home games on campus at Demon Stadium in Natchitoches, Louisiana.

Clayton was hired as head coach in January 1957 from Western Kentucky where he had served as head coach since 1948.

Schedule

Date	Opponent	Site	Result	Attendance	Source
September 14	vs. Stephen F. Austin*	State Fair Stadium; Shreveport, LA (rivalry)	W 20–7		
September 21	Lamar Tech*	Demon Stadium; Natchitoches, LA	L 10–20		
September 28	McNeese State	Demon Stadium; Natchitoches, LA (rivalry)	W 23–20	6,000	
October 5	at Louisiana College*	Alumni Stadium; Pineville, LA	W 25–7		
October 19	vs. Louisiana Tech	State Fair Stadium; Shreveport, LA (rivalry)	L 13–20		
October 26	Delta State*	Demon Stadium; Natchitoches, LA	W 26–0		
November 2	Northeast Louisiana State	Demon Stadium; Natchitoches, LA	W 26–20		
November 9	at Southwestern Louisiana	McNaspy Stadium; Lafayette, LA	W 19–0		
November 23	Southeastern Louisiana	Demon Stadium; Natchitoches, LA (rivalry)	W 13–7		
*Non-conference game

== 1958 ==
1958 Northwestern State Demons football

GSC co-champion

Christmas Festival Bowl, W 18–11 vs. Sam Houston State
- Conference: Gulf States Conference
- Record: 8–2 (4–1 GSC)
- Head coach: Jack Clayton (2nd season)
- Home stadium: Demon Stadium

1958 Gulf States Conference football standings
	Conf.					Overall
Team	W		L		T	W		L		T
Northwestern State +	4	–	1	–	0	8	–	2	–	0
Louisiana Tech +	4	–	1	–	0	7	–	3	–	0
Northeast Louisiana State	3	–	2	–	0	6	–	3	–	0
McNeese State	2	–	3	–	0	5	–	5	–	0
Southeastern Louisiana	2	–	3	–	0	4	–	5	–	0
Southwestern Louisiana	0	–	5	–	0	1	–	8	–	0
+ – Conference co-champions

The 1958 Northwestern State Demons football team was an American football team that represented Northwestern State College of Louisiana (now known as Northwestern State University) as a member of the Gulf States Conference (GSC) during the 1958 college football season. In their second year under head coach Jack Clayton, the team compiled an overall record of 8–2 with a mark of 4–1 in conference play, and finished as GSC co-champion. Northwestern State played their home games on campus at Demon Stadium in Natchitoches, Louisiana.

Schedule

Date	Opponent	Site	Result	Attendance	Source
September 13	vs. East Central State*	State Fair Stadium; Shreveport, LA	W 36–0	5,000	
September 27	at McNeese State	Wildcat Stadium; Lake Charles, LA (rivalry)	L 8–25	3,000	
October 4	Louisiana College*	Demon Stadium; Natchitoches, LA	L 12–13	6,000	
October 18	vs. No. T–20 Louisiana Tech	State Fair Stadium; Shreveport, LA (rivalry)	W 18–14	22,000	
October 25	Texas Lutheran*	Demon Stadium; Natchitoches, LA	W 43–12	4,000	
November 1	at Northeast Louisiana State	Brown Stadium; Monroe, LA	W 42–6	7,000	
November 8	Southwestern Louisiana	Demon Stadium; Natchitoches, LA	W 27–8	6,000	
November 15	Livingston State*	Demon Stadium; Natchitoches, LA	W 64–0	2,000	
November 22	at Southeastern Louisiana	Strawberry Stadium; Hammond, LA (rivalry)	W 7–0	2,000	
December 6	vs. Sam Houston State*	Demon Stadium; Natchitoches, LA (Christmas Festival Bowl)	W 18–11	6,000	
*Non-conference game; Rankings from UPI Poll released prior to the game

== 1959 ==
1959 Northwestern State Demons football
- Conference: Gulf States Conference
- Record: 4–5–1 (2–3 GSC)
- Head coach: Jack Clayton (3rd season)
- Home stadium: Demon Stadium

1959 Gulf States Conference football standings
	Conf.					Overall
Team	W		L		T	W		L		T
No. 7 Louisiana Tech $	5	–	0	–	0	9	–	1	–	0
McNeese State	2	–	3	–	0	6	–	3	–	0
Northwestern State	2	–	3	–	0	4	–	5	–	1
Southwestern Louisiana	2	–	3	–	0	4	–	5	–	0
Southeastern Louisiana	1	–	4	–	0	3	–	2	–	0
Northeast Louisiana State	1	–	4	–	0	2	–	8	–	0
$ – Conference champion; Rankings from NAIA poll

The 1959 Northwestern State Demons football team was an American football team that represented Northwestern State College of Louisiana (now known as Northwestern State University) as a member of the Gulf States Conference (GSC) during the 1959 college football season. In their third year under head coach Jack Clayton, the team compiled an overall record of 4–5–1 with a mark of 2–3 in conference play, and finished tied for second in the GSC. Northwestern State played their home games on campus at Demon Stadium in Natchitoches, Louisiana.

Schedule

Date	Opponent	Site	Result	Attendance	Source
September 12	vs. Stephen F. Austin*	State Fair Stadium; Shreveport, LA (rivalry)	T 14–14	5,000	
September 19	McNeese State	Demon Stadium; Natchitoches, LA (rivalry)	W 19–6	5,000	
September 26	vs. No. 17 Lamar Tech*	Yellow Jacket Stadium; Port Arthur, TX	L 0–19	7,000	
October 3	at Louisiana College*	Alumni Stadium; Pineville, LA	L 0–8	6,500	
October 10	Pensacola Navy*	Demon Stadium; Natchitoches, LA	W 17–10	7,000	
October 24	vs. No. 20 Louisiana Tech	State Fair Stadium; Shreveport, LA (rivalry)	L 14–27	23,500	
October 31	Colorado Mines*	Demon Stadium; Natchitoches, LA	W 37–0	7,000	
November 7	Northeast Louisiana State	Demon Stadium; Natchitoches, LA	W 24–19	3,500	
November 14	at Southwestern Louisiana	McNaspy Stadium; Lafayette, LA	L 14–34	6,000	
November 21	Southeastern Louisiana	Demon Stadium; Natchitoches, LA (rivalry)	L 13–15	5,000	
*Non-conference game; Rankings from UPI Poll released prior to the game
