= 1952 Louisiana Tech Bulldogs football team =

American college football season

1952 Louisiana Tech Bulldogs football

GSC co-champion
- Conference: Gulf States Conference
- Record: 6–1–2 (3–0–2 GSC)
- Head coach: Joe Aillet (12th season)
- Captains: Walter Savage; Tommy Woodall
- Home stadium: Tech Stadium

1952 Gulf States Conference football standings
	Conf.					Overall
Team	W		L		T	W		L		T
Louisiana Tech +	3	–	0	–	2	6	–	1	–	2
Southeastern Louisiana +	3	–	0	–	2	6	–	1	–	2
Southwestern Louisiana +	3	–	0	–	2	5	–	2	–	2
McNeese State	2	–	3	–	0	7	–	3	–	0
Louisiana College	0	–	4	–	1	3	–	7	–	1
Northwestern State	0	–	4	–	1	1	–	7	–	1
+ – Conference co-champions

The 1952 Louisiana Tech Bulldogs football team was an American football team that represented the Louisiana Polytechnic Institute (now known as Louisiana Tech University) as a member of the Gulf States Conference during the 1952 college football season. In their twelfth year under head coach Joe Aillet, the team compiled a 6–1–2 record.

== Schedule ==
Date	Opponent	Site	Result	Attendance	Source
September 20	McNeese State	Tech Stadium; Ruston, LA	W 6–0		
September 27	at Florida State*	Doak Campbell Stadium; Tallahassee, FL	W 32–13	7,843	
October 4	Memphis State*	Tech Stadium; Ruston, LA	W 26–7		
October 11	Central State (OK)*	Tech Stadium; Ruston, LA	W 34–6		
October 18	vs. Northwestern State	State Fair Stadium; Shreveport, LA (rivalry)	W 22–0		
October 25	Louisiana College^{†}	Tech Stadium; Ruston, LA	W 35–13		
November 1	at Southwestern Louisiana	McNaspy Stadium; Lafayette, LA (rivalry)	T 19–19		
November 8	Southeastern Louisiana	Tech Stadium; Ruston, LA	T 7–7		
November 15	at Mississippi Southern*	Faulkner Field; Hattiesburg, MS (rivalry)	L 0–52	10,000+	
*Non-conference game; ^{†}Homecoming
