= Stan Galloway =

American football coach, athletics administrator (1915–2000)

Biographical details
- Born: July 1, 1915; Blond, Louisiana, U.S.
- Died: October 14, 2000 (aged 85); Hammond, Louisiana, U.S.

Playing career

Football
- 1934–1935: Southeastern Louisiana
- Position: Halfback

Coaching career (HC unless noted)

Football
- 1939–1940: Donaldsonville HS (LA)
- 1941: Hammond HS (LA)
- 1942–1950: Bogalusa HS (LA)
- 1951–1964: Southeastern Louisiana

Basketball
- 1942–1951: Bogalusa HS (LA)

Track and field
- 1942–1951: Bogalusa HS (LA)

Administrative career (AD unless noted)
- 1951: Bolton HS (LA)
- 1971–1979: Gulf South (commissioner)

Head coaching record
- Overall: 84–42–4 (college football)

Accomplishments and honors

Championships
- 6 Gulf States (1952–1954, 1956, 1960–1961)

Stanley Newell Galloway (July 1, 1915 – October 14, 2000) was an American football coach and athletics administrator. He served as the head football coach at Southeastern Louisiana College—now known as Southeastern Louisiana University—in Hammond, Louisiana for 14 seasons, from 1951 to 1964, compiling a record of 84–42–4. Galloway was the commissioner of the Gulf South Conference from 1971 to 1979.

Galloway was born in Blond, Louisiana. He attended Lyon High School in Covington, Louisiana.

Galloway began his coaching career in 1939, at Donaldsonville High School in Donaldsonville, Louisiana. In 1941, after two years at Donaldsonville, he went to Hammond High School in Hammond. A year later, he moved on to Bogalusa High School in Bogalusa, Louisiana, succeeding Arthur Morton as head football coach. He also coached basketball and track and field at Bogalusa until 1951, when he left to become the athletic director and head coach at Bolton High School in Alexandria, Louisiana. After a brief tenure at Bolton, Galloway left the school before coaching a game to become the head football coach at Southeastern Louisiana College, succeeding Ned McGehee.

Galloway died on October 14, 2000, at North Oaks Medical Center in Hammond.

== Head coaching record ==
=== College football ===
Year	Team	Overall	Conference	Standing	Bowl/playoffs
Southeastern Louisiana Lions (Gulf States Conference) (1951–1964)
1951	Southeastern Louisiana	7–3	4–1	2nd	
1952	Southeastern Louisiana	6–1–2	3–0–2	T–1st	
1953	Southeastern Louisiana	6–3	5–1	T–1st	
1954	Southeastern Louisiana	9–0	6–0	1st	
1955	Southeastern Louisiana	5–5	4–2	3rd	
1956	Southeastern Louisiana	6–3	4–1	1st	
1957	Southeastern Louisiana	2–6–1	1–3–1	T–4th	
1958	Southeastern Louisiana	4–5	2–3	T–4th	
1959	Southeastern Louisiana	2–8	1–4	6th	
1960	Southeastern Louisiana	9–1	4–1	T–1st	
1961	Southeastern Louisiana	9–1	4–1	T–1st	
1962	Southeastern Louisiana	6–3	3–2	T–2nd	
1963	Southeastern Louisiana	4–4–1	3–2	T–2nd	
1964	Southeastern Louisiana	6–3	4–1	2nd	
Southeastern Louisiana:		84–42–4	50–20–3		
Total:		84–42–4			
National championship Conference title Conference division title or championship game berth
