= 1951 Mississippi Southern Southerners football team =

American college football season

1951 Mississippi Southern Southerners football

GSC champion
- Conference: Gulf States Conference
- Record: 6–5 (4–0 GSC)
- Head coach: Thad Vann (3rd season)
- Home stadium: Faulkner Field

1951 Gulf States Conference football standings
	Conf.					Overall
Team	W		L		T	W		L		T
Mississippi Southern $	4	–	0	–	0	6	–	5	–	0
Southeastern Louisiana	4	–	1	–	0	7	–	3	–	0
Southwestern Louisiana	3	–	2	–	0	6	–	4	–	0
Louisiana Tech	2	–	3	–	0	4	–	5	–	0
Louisiana College	1	–	3	–	0	5	–	6	–	0
Northwestern State	0	–	5	–	0	1	–	8	–	0
$ – Conference champion

The 1951 Mississippi Southern Southerners football team was an American football team that represented Mississippi Southern College (now known as the University of Southern Mississippi) as a member of the Gulf States Conference during the 1951 college football season. In their third year under head coach Thad Vann, the team compiled a 6–5 record.

== Schedule ==
Date	Opponent	Site	Result	Attendance	Source
September 15	East Carolina*	Faulkner Field; Hattiesburg, MS	W 40–0		
September 22	at LSU*	Tiger Stadium; Baton Rouge, LA	L 0–13	24,000	
September 29	Carswell Air Force Base*	Faulkner Field; Hattiesburg, MS	L 0–26		
October 6	at McMurry*	Fair Park Stadium; Abilene, TX	W 54–7	10,000	
October 13	at Southwestern Louisiana	McNaspy Stadium; Lafayette, LA	W 41–0		
October 20	Southeastern Louisiana	Faulkner Field; Hattiesburg, MS	W 35–6		
October 26	at Chattanooga*	Chamberlain Field; Chattanooga, TN	L 7–19	11,500	
November 3	Northwestern State^{†}	Faulkner Field; Hattiesburg, MS	W 76–0	6,500	
November 10	at Alabama*	Denny Stadium; Tuscaloosa, AL	L 7–40	14,000	
November 17	at Louisiana Tech	Tech Stadium; Ruston, LA (rivalry)	W 33–7		
November 23	at Louisville*	duPont Manual Stadium; Louisville, KY	L 13–14	1,200	
*Non-conference game; ^{†}Homecoming
