= Raymond Didier =

American football coach, baseball coach and college athletics administrator

Biographical details
- Born: January 17, 1920; Marksville, Louisiana, U.S.
- Died: March 9, 1978 (aged 58); Jefferson, Louisiana, U.S.

Playing career

Football
- 1938–1939: Southwestern Louisiana
- 1946: Southwestern Louisiana

Baseball
- 1939: Southwestern Louisiana
- 1940: Port Arthur Tarpons
- 1946–1947: Southwestern Louisiana

Coaching career (HC unless noted)

Football
- 1948–1950: Southwestern Louisiana (ends)
- 1951–1956: Southwestern Louisiana
- 1957–1962: LSU (asst.)

Baseball
- 1948–1956: Southwestern Louisiana
- 1957–1963: LSU
- 1964–1973: Nicholls State

Administrative career (AD unless noted)
- 1963–1978: Nicholls State

Head coaching record
- Overall: 29–27–2 (football); 458–311–4 (baseball)

Accomplishments and honors

Championships
- Football; SLI: 1 Gulf States (1952); Baseball; SLI: 5 Gulf States, LSU: 1 SEC (1961), NSU: 1 Gulf States

Raymond Ernest Didier (January 17, 1920 – March 9, 1978) was an American football coach, baseball coach and college athletics administrator. He served as the head football coach at the Southwestern Louisiana Institute—now known as University of Louisiana at Lafayette from 1951 to 1956, tallying a mark of 29–27–2. Didier was also the head baseball coach at Southwestern Louisiana from 1948 to 1956, Louisiana State University from 1957 to 1963 and Nicholls State University from 1964 to 1973, amassing a career college baseball record of 458–311–4. Didier served as the athletic director at Nicholls State from 1963 to 1978.

== Accolades ==
Ray E. Didier Field on the campus of Nicholls State University is named after him. Didier is a member of the Louisiana Sports Hall of Fame.

== Head coaching record ==
=== Football ===
Year	Team	Overall	Conference	Standing	Bowl/playoffs
Southwestern Louisiana Bulldogs (Gulf States Conference) (1951–1956)
1951	Southwestern Louisiana	6–4	3–2	3rd	
1952	Southwestern Louisiana	5–2–2	3–0–2	T–1st	
1953	Southwestern Louisiana	4–7	2–4	T–4th	
1954	Southwestern Louisiana	5–4	4–2	T–2nd	
1955	Southwestern Louisiana	5–4	3–3	4th	
1956	Southwestern Louisiana	4–6	1–4	6th	
Southwestern Louisiana:		29–27–2	16–15–2		
Total:		29–27–2			
National championship Conference title Conference division title or championship game berth

=== Baseball ===
Record table
Season	Team	Overall	Conference	Standing	Postseason
Southwestern Louisiana Bulldogs (Gulf States Conference) (1948–1956)
1948	Southwestern Louisiana	18–9	12–3	2nd	
1949	Southwestern Louisiana				
1950	Southwestern Louisiana	20–7	16–3	1st	
1951	Southwestern Louisiana				
1952	Southwestern Louisiana				
1953	Southwestern Louisiana	10–15			
1954	Southwestern Louisiana	11–13			
1955	Southwestern Louisiana	15–12			
1956	Southwestern Louisiana				
Southwestern Louisiana:		137–78 (.637)			
LSU Tigers (Southeastern Conference) (1957–1963)
1957	LSU	8–11	6–8	8th	
1958	LSU	14–11	9–6	4th	
1959	LSU	16–17	7–9	3rd (West)	
1960	LSU	15–14	6–9	4th (West)	
1961	LSU	20–5	11–4	1st (West)	
1962	LSU	15–11–1	8–7–1	2nd (West)	
1963	LSU	16–10	9–7	2nd (West)	
LSU:		104–79–1 (.568)	56–50–1 (.528)		
Nicholls State Colonels (NCAA College Division independent) (1964–1965)
1964	Nicholls State	14–13	independent		
1965	Nicholls State	17–14–1	independent		
Nicholls State Colonels (Gulf States Conference) (1966–1971)
1966	Nicholls State	13–18–1	9–11–1	6th	
1967	Nicholls State	18–14	11–11	4th	
1968	Nicholls State	18–17–1	11–10–1	3rd	
1969	Nicholls State	28–13	15–9	2nd	
1970	Nicholls State	35–19	14–8	2nd	
1971	Nicholls State	25–19	10–14	5th	
Nicholls State Colonels (Gulf South Conference) (1972–1973)
1972	Nicholls State	25–14			
1973	Nicholls State	24–13	10–3	1st W.Div.	
Nicholls State:		217–154–3 (.584)	80–66–2 (.547)		
Total:		458–311–4 (.595)			
National champion Postseason invitational champion Conference regular season champion Conference regular season and conference tournament champion Division regular season champion Division regular season and conference tournament champion Conference tournament champion
