= 1950 Mississippi Southern Southerners football team =

American college football season

1950 Mississippi Southern Southerners football

GSC champion
- Conference: Gulf States Conference
- Record: 5–5 (3–1 GSC)
- Head coach: Thad Vann (2nd season)
- Home stadium: Faulkner Field

1950 Gulf States Conference football standings
	Conf.					Overall
Team	W		L		T	W		L		T
Mississippi Southern $	3	–	1	–	0	5	–	5	–	0
Louisiana Tech	3	–	2	–	0	5	–	4	–	1
Louisiana College	2	–	2	–	0	5	–	5	–	0
Northwestern State	2	–	3	–	0	6	–	4	–	0
Southeastern Louisiana	2	–	3	–	0	6	–	4	–	0
Southwestern Louisiana	2	–	3	–	0	5	–	4	–	0
$ – Conference champion

The 1950 Mississippi Southern Southerners football team was an American football team that represented Mississippi Southern College (now known as the University of Southern Mississippi) as a member of the Gulf States Conference during the 1950 college football season. In their second year under head coach Thad Vann, the team compiled a 5–5 record.

== Schedule ==
Date	Opponent	Site	Result	Attendance	Source
September 23	at No. 4 Tennessee*	Shields–Watkins Field; Knoxville, TN	L 0–56	23,000	
September 30	Delta State*	Faulkner Field; Hattiesburg, MS	L 13–19	7,500	
October 7	at McMurry*	Fair Park Stadium; Abilene, TX	L 19–37	3,000	
October 14	Southwestern Louisiana^{†}	Faulkner Field; Hattiesburg, MS	W 6–0		
October 21	at Southeastern Louisiana	Strawberry Stadium; Hammond, LA	L 0–7	4,000	
October 27	Chattanooga*	Ladd Stadium; Mobile, AL	W 14–13	5,000	
November 5	at Northwestern State	Demon Stadium; Natchitoches, LA	W 7–0		
November 11	at Alabama*	Denny Stadium; Tuscaloosa, AL	L 0–53	15,000	
November 18	Louisiana Tech	Faulkner Field; Hattiesburg, MS (rivalry)	W 41–20		
November 25	Louisville*	Faulkner Field; Hattiesburg, MS	W 34–28	3,000	
*Non-conference game; ^{†}Homecoming; Rankings from Coaches' Poll released prior to the game
