= Sabine Shoe =

College football trophy

- Louisiana Ragin' Cajuns Lamar Cardinals
- Sport: Football
- First meeting: October 27, 1923; Southwestern Louisiana 19, Lamar 16
- Latest meeting: September 5, 2026; Louisiana 38, Lamar 7
- Trophy: Sabine Shoe

Statistics
- Total meetings: 35
- All-time series: Louisiana leads, 23–11 (Note: In 2015, Louisiana–Lafayette vacated four wins from their 2012 football season, including their win over Lamar, due to alleged major NCAA violations. See Wikipedia:WikiProject College football/Vacated victories for an explanation of how vacated victories are recorded.)
- Largest victory: Louisiana–Lafayette, 40–0 (2012)
- Longest win streak: 4 games, four times by Louisiana–Lafayette, and once by Lamar
- Current win streak: Louisiana, 1 (2026–present)

Locations of Lamar and Louisiana

The Sabine Shoe is the name of the bronze shoe trophy that was awarded to the winner of the annual college football game between the Louisiana Ragin' Cajuns (formerly the Southwestern Louisiana Bulldogs) of the University of Louisiana at Lafayette (formerly the University of Southwestern Louisiana) in Lafayette, Louisiana and the Lamar Cardinals of Lamar University in Beaumont, Texas. The Sabine Shoe trophy was first awarded in 1968 by the University of Southwestern Louisiana's chapter of Alpha Phi Omega fraternity. The name of the bronze rivalry trophy was derived from the Sabine River that forms part of the Texas–Louisiana border. USL defeated Lamar in the 1978 edition of the rivalry game, but the Ragin' Cajuns were not awarded the trophy as it had vanished. The Sabine Shoe trophy now sits in at trophy case in the Ragin' Cajun Athletic Complex in Lafayette.

The two teams have met 34 times on the field, with the Ragin' Cajuns currently holding a 23–11 edge in the series. The game has been played infrequently following the Ragin' Cajuns departure from the Southland Conference after the 1981 season. In 1982, the conference was one of several forced to reclassify from NCAA's Division I-A—now known as the NCAA Division I Football Bowl Subdivision (FBS)—to Division I-AA—now known as the Football Championship Subdivision (FBS). The Ragin' Cajuns, met the NCAA requirements to remain a Division I-A member and chose to continue participation in that subdivision. Lamar remains a member of the FCS.

== Game results ==
| Louisiana victories | Lamar victories | Vacated wins |

| No. | Date | Location | Winner | Score |
|---|---|---|---|---|
| 1 | October 27, 1923 | Beaumont, TX | Southwestern Louisiana | 19–16 |
| 2 | November 8, 1924 | Lafayette, LA | Southwestern Louisiana | 20–8 |
| 3 | October 10, 1925 | Lafayette, LA | Southwestern Louisiana | 14–0 |
| 4 | October 23, 1926 | Lafayette, LA | Southwestern Louisiana | 19–0 |
| 5 | November 5, 1932 | Beaumont, TX | Lamar College | 6–0 |
| 6 | October 6, 1933 | Lafayette, LA | Southwestern Louisiana | 7–6 |
| 7 | October 3, 1936 | Lafayette, LA | Southwestern Louisiana | 13–6 |
| 8 | September 20, 1952 | Lafayette, LA | Southwestern Louisiana | 14–13 |
| 9 | September 19, 1953 | Beaumont, TX | Southwestern Louisiana | 22–13 |
| 10 | September 18, 1954 | Lafayette, LA | Lamar Tech | 26–20 |
| 11 | September 17, 1955 | Beaumont, TX | Lamar Tech | 19–6 |
| 12 | September 15, 1956 | Lafayette, LA | Lamar Tech | 21–14 |
| 13 | September 28, 1957 | Beaumont, TX | Lamar Tech | 36–20 |
| 14 | October 30, 1965 | Beaumont, TX | Southwestern Louisiana | 20–6 |
| 15 | October 8, 1966 | Lafayette, LA | Southwestern Louisiana | 14–6 |
| 16 | September 23, 1967 | Beaumont, TX | Lamar Tech | 14–13 |
| 17 | October 26, 1968 | Lafayette, LA | Southwestern Louisiana | 20–14 |
| 18 | October 25, 1969 | Beaumont, TX | Southwestern Louisiana | 24–16 |

| No. | Date | Location | Winner | Score |
|---|---|---|---|---|
| 19 | October 24, 1970 | Lafayette, LA | Southwestern Louisiana | 15–6 |
| 20 | October 23, 1971 | Beaumont, TX | Southwestern Louisiana | 21–20 |
| 21 | October 21, 1972 | Lafayette, LA | Lamar | 3–0 |
| 22 | October 20, 1973 | Beaumont, TX | Lamar | 31–0 |
| 23 | October 5, 1974 | Lafayette, LA | Lamar | 38–13 |
| 24 | October 18, 1975 | Lafayette, LA | Southwestern Louisiana | 21–12 |
| 25 | October 9, 1976 | Beaumont, TX | Southwestern Louisiana | 34–9 |
| 26 | September 17, 1977 | Beaumont, TX | Southwestern Louisiana | 10–6 |
| 27 | September 30, 1978 | Lafayette, LA | Southwestern Louisiana | 23–16 |
| 28 | October 20, 1979 | Beaumont, TX | Lamar | 21–17 |
| 29 | October 25, 1980 | Lafayette, LA | Southwestern Louisiana | 38–10 |
| 30 | November 14, 1981 | Beaumont, TX | Lamar | 14–12 |
| 31 | October 23, 1982 | Lafayette, LA | Southwestern Louisiana | 24–0 |
| 32 | October 22, 1983 | Lafayette, LA | Southwestern Louisiana | 31–6 |
| 33 | November 11, 1989 | Lafayette, LA | Southwestern Louisiana | 42–33 |
| 34 | September 1, 2012 | Lafayette, LA | Louisiana–Lafayette | 40–0 |
| 35 | September 5, 2026 | Lafayette, LA | Louisiana | 38–7 |
Series: Louisiana leads 23–11

== See also ==
- List of NCAA college football rivalry games
