= Louisiana Ragin' Cajuns football =

American college football team

2026 Louisiana Ragin' Cajuns football team
- First season: 1901; 125 years ago
- Athletic director: Unknown
- Head coach: Michael Desormeaux; 5th season, 35–27 (.565)
- Location: Lafayette, Louisiana
- Stadium: Cajun Field at Our Lady of Lourdes Stadium (capacity: 30,392)
- NCAA division: Division I FBS
- Conference: Sun Belt
- Division: West
- Colors: Vermilion and white
- All-time record: 607–586–33 (.509)
- Bowl record: 8–7–0 (.533)

Conference championships
- GSC: 1952, 1965, 1968, 1970 Big West: 1993, 1994 SBC: 2005, 2013, 2020, 2021

Division championships
- SBC West: 2018, 2019, 2021, 2024
- Consensus All-Americans: 4
- Rivalries: Louisiana Tech (rivalry); ULM (rivalry)
- Fight song: Ragin' Cajuns Fight Song
- Marching band: Pride of Acadiana
- Outfitter: Adidas
- Website: RaginCajuns.com

The Louisiana Ragin' Cajuns football (formerly competed as Southwestern Louisiana or USL, later and still often referred to as Louisiana or UL) program is a college football team that represents the University of Louisiana at Lafayette at the NCAA Division I Football Bowl Subdivision (FBS) level as a member of the Sun Belt Conference. Since 1971, the team has played its home games at Cajun Field in Lafayette, Louisiana. Michael Desormeaux has served as Louisiana's head coach since 2021.

The RCAF (Ragin Cajun Athletic Foundation) is the supporter association that assists with funding for all Ragin Cajun sports.

== History ==
The program began play in 1901 when the school was known as Southwestern Louisiana Industrial Institute. The school's sports teams were known as the Southwestern Louisiana Bulldogs from 1921 until 1973. The school's fight name was formally changed to Ragin' Cajuns in 1974, which had been in use since the 1960s. In 1999, the university took on its current name, at which point its sports teams were referred to as Louisiana–Lafayette. A rebranding in 2017 dropped "Lafayette" from the Cajuns' name.

Between 2011 and 2014, the Cajuns won four consecutive New Orleans Bowls, representing the most successful stretch in the program's history at the time, but later had to vacate two of the victories due to NCAA violations.

Between 2018 and 2021, during the tenure of head coach Billy Napier, the Cajuns reached many milestones, including the first National ranking in program history, four consecutive division championships, two conference championships, three bowl championships, and the best season finish and conference finish in the 2021 season, finishing 13–1 and 7–0 in conference play.

The Cajuns have had several players go to play professionally in the National Football League (NFL), including Jake Delhomme, Charles Tillman, Brian Mitchell, Orlando Thomas, Brandon Stokely, Elijah McGuire, Elijah Mitchell, Kevin Dotson, Chris Cagle, Ike Taylor, and Robert Hunt.

Before 1974, the team's official nickname was the Bulldogs, although the current nickname was in common use with the football team for approximately the decade prior.

=== Division history ===
Years	Division
1937–1962	National Junior College Athletic Association
1963–1972	NCAA College Division (Small College)
1973	NCAA Division II
1974–1977	NCAA Division I
1978–present	NCAA Division I-A (FBS)

== Conference affiliations ==
Louisiana has been both independent and a member of four different conferences.

- Independent (1901–1947)
- Gulf States Conference (1948–1970)
- Southland Conference (1971–1981)
- NCAA Division I-A independent (1982–1992)
- Big West Conference (1993–1995)
- Independent (1996–2000)
- Sun Belt Conference (2001–present)

== Championships ==
=== Conference championships ===
Louisiana has won 10 conference championships, with the 2013 championship later vacated.

Year	Conference	Coach	Conference record	Overall record
1952†	Gulf States Conference	Raymond Didier	3–0–2	5–2–2
1965†	Gulf States Conference	Russ Faulkinberry	4–1	7–3
1968	Gulf States Conference	Russ Faulkinberry	5–1	8–2
1970	Gulf States Conference	Russ Faulkinberry	5–0	9–3
1993†	Big West Conference	Nelson Stokley	5–1	8–3
1994†	Big West Conference	Nelson Stokley	5–1	6–5
2005†	Sun Belt Conference	Rickey Bustle	5–2	6–5
2013†‡	Sun Belt Conference	Mark Hudspeth	5–2	9–4
2020†^	Sun Belt Conference	Billy Napier	7–1	10–1
2021	Sun Belt Conference	Billy Napier	8–0	13–1

† Co-champions
‡ Louisiana vacated the 2013 Sun Belt Conference co-championship due to major NCAA violations.
^ The 2020 championship game was not played due to Coastal Carolina being impacted by the COVID-19 pandemic. For College Football Playoff purposes, Coastal Carolina was viewed as the 2020 Sun Belt Champions. Recognizing that the College Football Playoff committee had no jurisdiction to that magnitude coupled with a desire to prevent the diminishment to the Louisiana Ragin’ Cajuns football team’s accomplishments in 2020, Lafayette Mayor-President Josh Guillory declared, by executive proclamation, the Louisiana Ragin' Cajuns football team as the 2020 sole champions of the Sun Belt Conference in football.

=== Division championships ===
Louisiana has won five division championships, most recently in the 2024 season.

Year	Division	Coach	Conf. record	Overall record	Opponent	CG result
2018	Sun Belt West	Billy Napier	5–3	7–7	Appalachian State	L 19–30
2019	Sun Belt West	Billy Napier	7–1	11–3	Appalachian State	L 38–45
2020	Sun Belt West	Billy Napier	7–1	10–1	Coastal Carolina	No Contest^
2021	Sun Belt West	Billy Napier	8–0	13–1	Appalachian State	W 24–16
2024	Sun Belt West	Michael Desormeaux	7–1	10–3	Marshall	L 3–31

^ The 2020 championship game was not played due to Coastal Carolina being impacted by the COVID-19 pandemic.

== Postseason history ==
=== National Junior College Athletic Association ===
Date	Coach	Bowl	Opponent	Result
January 1, 1944	Louis Whitman	Oil Bowl	Arkansas–Monticello	W 24–7

=== NCAA Small College Division ===
Date	Coach	Bowl	Opponent	Result
December 12, 1970	Russ Faulkinberry	Grantland Rice Bowl	Tennessee State	L 25–26

=== NCAA Division I FBS ===
Since joining the NCAA Division I-A (FBS) in 1978, the Ragin' Cajuns have played in 13 bowl games, although two of those games (which were victories) were vacated due to sanctions. Officially, they have a record of 5–6 in bowl games.

Date	Coach	Bowl	Opponent	Result
December 17, 2011	Mark Hudspeth	New Orleans Bowl†	San Diego State	W 32–30
December 22, 2012	Mark Hudspeth	New Orleans Bowl	East Carolina	W 43–34
December 21, 2013	Mark Hudspeth	New Orleans Bowl†	Tulane	W 24–21
December 20, 2014	Mark Hudspeth	New Orleans Bowl	Nevada	W 16–3
December 17, 2016	Mark Hudspeth	New Orleans Bowl	Southern Miss	L 21–28
December 15, 2018	Billy Napier	Cure Bowl	Tulane	L 24–41
January 6, 2020	Billy Napier	LendingTree Bowl	Miami (OH)	W 27–17
December 26, 2020	Billy Napier	First Responder Bowl	UTSA	W 31–24
December 18, 2021	Michael Desormeaux	New Orleans Bowl	Marshall	W 36–21
December 23, 2022	Michael Desormeaux	Independence Bowl	Houston	L 16–23
December 16, 2023	Michael Desormeaux	New Orleans Bowl	Jacksonville State	L 31–34 ^{OT}
December 28, 2024	Michael Desormeaux	New Mexico Bowl	TCU	L 3–34
December 17, 2025	Michael Desormeaux	68 Ventures Bowl	Delaware	L 13–20

† Vacated

== Home stadiums ==
=== McNaspy Stadium ===
In 1940, McNaspy Stadium was built on the campus of Southwestern Louisiana Institute (now University of Louisiana at Lafayette). It served as the Cajuns' home field through the 1970 season, and was demolished in 2000. McNaspy Stadium was located where the current computer science building Oliver Hall now stands.

=== Our Lady of Lourdes Stadium ===
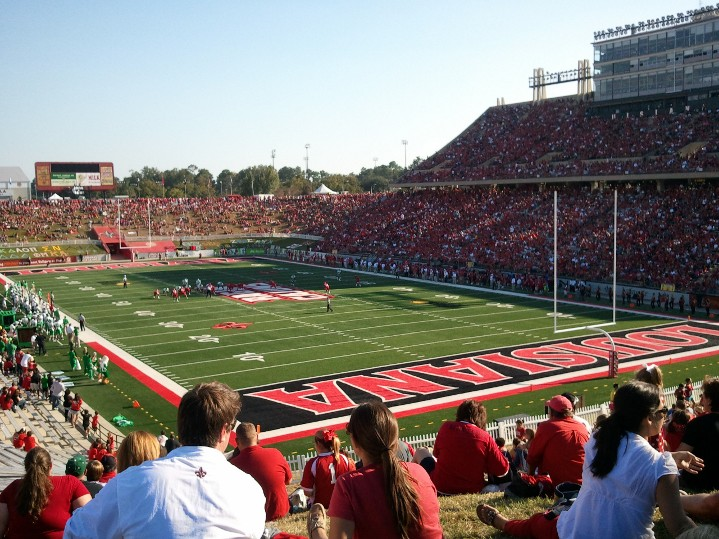
Our Lady of Lourdes Stadium on game day

Originally known as Cajun Field upon its opening in 1970, the circa 2020s renamed Our Lady of Lourdes Stadium is a football stadium located in the city of Lafayette, Louisiana, and has served as the home field of the Louisiana Ragin' Cajuns football team since 1970. It has an official capacity of 41,426 with 2,577 chairback seats, and its nickname is "The Swamp."

In June of 2021 it was announced that Our Lady of Lourdes Stadium would undergo a $75 million renovation, with construction slated to begin in the summer of 2022. The plans are to demolish the current West Tower, and replace it with a state of the art facility, including amenities such as premium suites, a club level and club seats, loge boxes, and press box. Because of a $15 million donation, the stadium will now be known as "Cajun Field at Our Lady of Lourdes Stadium."

== Head coaches ==
Years coached	Season(s)	Name	Record
1901–1902	2	Ashby Woodson	3–2
1903	1	J. Ovey Herpin	1–1
1904	1	Edwin F. Gayle	2–0–1
1906	1	Herbert McNaspy	1–0–1
1907	1	Jefferson Caffery	1–0
1908–1911; 1913; 1917–1918	4, 1, 2	Clement J. McNaspy	34–15–4
1912	1	H. Lee Prather	3–4
1914–1915	2	Richard B. Dunbar	10–5–1
1916; 1919; 1921–1930	1, 1, 10	T. R. Mobley	57–48–7
1920	1	Herbert O. Tudor	2–8
1931–1936	6	Truman F. Wilbanks	19–32–2
1937–1941; 1946	5, 1	Johnny Cain	33–19–5
1942–1945	4	Louis Whitman	14–14–2
1947–1949	3	Gee Mitchell	18–8–1
1950	1	A. L. Swanson	5–4
1951–1956	6	Raymond Didier	29–23–2
1957	1	John Robert Bell	4–5–1
1958–1960	3	Red Hoggatt	11–17
1961–1973	13	Russ Faulkinberry	66–63–2
1974–1979	6	Augie Tammariello	30–35–2
1980–1985	6	Sam Robertson	29–34–2
1986–1998	13	Nelson Stokley	62–80–1
1999–2001	3	Jerry Baldwin	6–27
2002–2010	9	Rickey Bustle	41–65
2011–2017	7	Mark Hudspeth	29–38†
2018–2021	4	Billy Napier	40–12
2021–present	5	Michael Desormeaux	35-27

† Hudspeth's record of 51–38 was reduced to 29–38 due to alleged NCAA violations.

== Rivalries ==
=== Lamar ===
Although no longer an active rivalry, the first Sabine Shoe trophy was first awarded in 1937 to the winner of the SLI–Lamar football game. The name of the bronze rivalry trophy was derived from the Sabine River that forms the Texas–Louisiana border. USL defeated Lamar in the 1978 edition of the rivalry game, but the Ragin' Cajuns were not awarded the trophy, as it had vanished. The Sabine Shoe trophy now sits in at trophy case in the Ragin' Cajun Athletic Complex.

Louisiana–Lamar: all-time record
Games played	First meeting	Last meeting	LA wins	LA losses	Ties	Win %
35	October 27, 1923 (won 19–16)	September 5th, 2026 (won 38-7)	23	11	0	66.7%

=== McNeese ===
This is another former rivalry. When active, the Cajun Crown was the name of the trophy between Louisiana and McNeese.

Louisiana–McNeese: all-time record
Games played	First meeting	Last meeting	LA wins	LA losses	Ties	Win %
38	September 22, 1951 (won 35–14)	September 6, 2025 (won 34–10)	17	20	2	46.1%

=== Southeastern Louisiana ===
This is another former rivalry. The Cypress Mug was the turned, polished mahogany mug awarded to the winner of the Southwestern–Southeastern football game.

Louisiana–Southeastern Louisiana: all-time record
Games played	First meeting	Last meeting	LA wins	LA losses	Ties	Win %
41	November 11, 1930 (won 13–0)	September 3, 2022 (won 24–7)	21	17	3	54.9%

=== ULM ===
The Battle on the Bayou is the annual rivalry game between Louisiana and ULM. The wooden boot-shaped rivalry trophy was created in 2002.

Louisiana–ULM: all-time record
Games played	First meeting	Last meeting	LA wins	LA losses	Ties	Win %
59	September 15, 1951 (lost 7–13)	November 29, 2025 (won 30–27 ^{OT})	34	26	0	56.7%

=== Appalachian State ===
Louisiana–Appalachian State: all-time record
Games played	First meeting	Last meeting	LA wins	LA losses	Ties	Win %
12	November 22, 2014 (lost 16–35)	October 12, 2024 (won 34–24)	4	8	0	33.3%

=== Arkansas State ===
Louisiana–Arkansas State: all-time record
Games played	First meeting	Last meeting	LA wins	LA losses	Ties	Win %
53	October 17, 1953 (lost 12–13)	November 20, 2025 (won 34–30)	30	22	1	57.6%

=== Louisiana Tech ===
Louisiana–Louisiana Tech: all-time record
Games played	First meeting	Last meeting	LA wins	LA losses	Ties	Win %
87	1910 (lost 0–75)	October 3, 2015 (lost 14–43)	33	48	6	41.4%

== Notable players ==
- Dr. Jermain Tezeno, DPT
- Michael Adams
- Louis Age
- Patrise Alexander
- Boris Anyama
- James Atkins
- D'Anthony Batiste
- Bill Blackburn
- C. C. Brown
- Percy Butler
- Wayde Butler
- Chris Cagle
- Raymond Calais
- Anthony Clement
- Kenyon Cotton
- Richie Cunningham
- Jake Delhomme
- Michael Desormeaux
- Kevin Dotson
- Tyrell Fenroy
- Jason Fletcher
- Ladarius Green
- Mark Hall
- Justin Hamilton
- Alonzo Harris
- Kyries Hebert
- Keno Hills
- Weldon Humble
- Robert Hunt
- Elvis Joseph
- Levi Lewis
- Damon Mason
- Randy McClanahan
- Elijah McGuire
- Brian Mitchell
- Elijah Mitchell
- Max Mitchell
- Donovan Morgan
- Trey Ragas
- Christian Ringo
- Todd Scott
- Rafael Septién
- Antwain Spann
- Fred Stamps
- Brandon Stokley
- Ike Taylor
- Orlando Thomas
- Charles Tillman
- Clarence Verdin
- Tracy Walker
- Melvin White

== Future non-conference opponents ==
Announced schedules as of September 15, 2026.

2026	2027	2028	2029	2030	2031	2032
Lamar	at UCF	at TCU		New Mexico State		Charlotte
at USC	at Tulane	McNeese		at Buffalo		Liberty
UAB	East Texas A&M	Tulsa				
at Charlotte	Kennesaw State	at Liberty				

== See also ==
- List of NCAA Division I FBS football programs
