= Bogalusa High School =

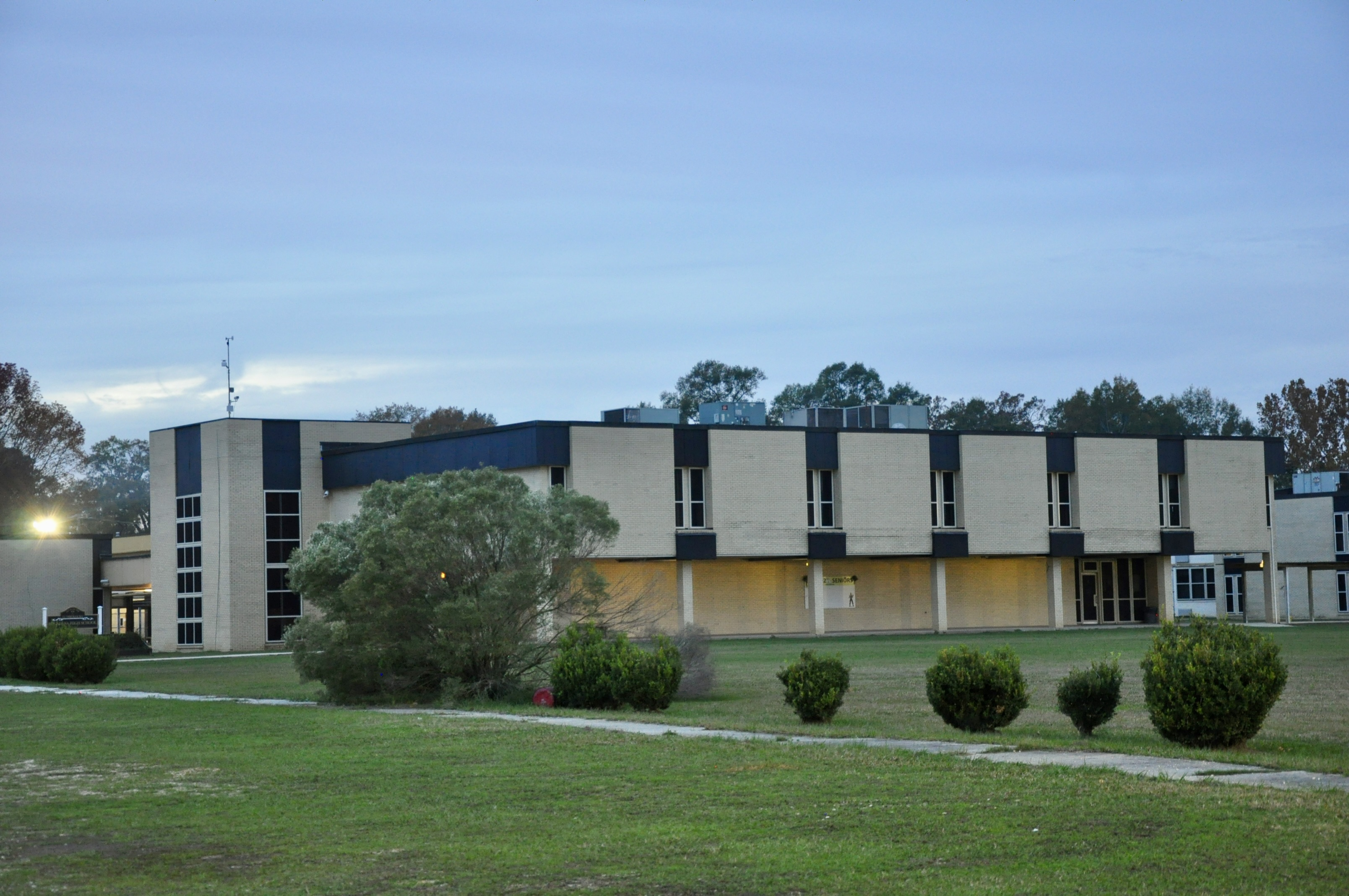

Location
- 100 MJ Israel Drive; Bogalusa, Louisiana 70427; United States; 30°46′49″N 89°52′3″W

Information
- Type: Public
- Motto: Bogalusa High School will provide learning opportunities for college and career readiness for all students to succeed in life.
- Established: 1917
- Principal: Debra Williams
- Enrollment: 698 (2023-2024)
- Colors: Black and Vegas gold
- Mascot: Lumberjacks
- Yearbook: Lumberjack
- Website: Official website

Bogalusa High School (BHS) is the high school of the Bogalusa City Schools district in Bogalusa, Louisiana, United States.

The district serves the City of Bogalusa, the unincorporated area of Rio, and some additional unincorporated areas.

== School information ==
Bogalusa High School, alongside other schools in the district, are on a 4 day school week, implemented in 2023.

Bogalusa High school is home to the JROTC "Lumberjack Battalion."

On Tuesday April 17, a day after the Virginia Tech Massacre a Bogalusa man passed a note to a Bogalusa student making threatening remarks about a mass killing similar to the incident at Virginia Tech.

== Athletics ==
Bogalusa High athletics competes in the LHSAA.

=== Championships ===
'Football championships

- (1) State Championships: 1947, 1969

== Notable alumni ==
- Kenderick Allen (born 1978), former NFL defensive tackle
- Ben Nevers (born 1946), Class of 1964, state senator from Washington Parish
- Henry "Tank" Powell (born 1945), Class of 1963, insurance agent, state representative from Tangipahoa Parish (1996–2008), and member of the Louisiana Board of Pardons.
- Harold Ritchie (born 1949), Class of 1967, state representative for District 75 since 2004
- Javarious Scott (Jaydayoungan) (1998–2022), rapper/musician who attended Bogalusa High School but did not graduate. His songs such as "23 Island", "Elimination", and "Thot Thot" have amassed millions of views on multiple music streaming platforms.
- Tom Thornhill (born 1952) Class of 1970, Slidell attorney and member of the Louisiana House of Representatives from 1996-2000
