= Northwestern State–Southeastern Louisiana football rivalry =

American college football rivalry

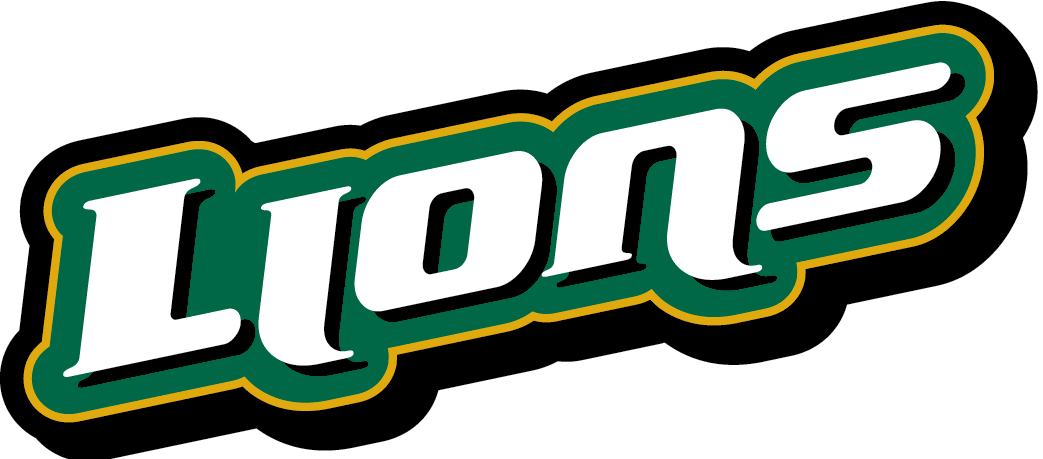
- Northwestern State Demons Southeastern Louisiana Lions
- Sport: Football
- First meeting: September 20, 1935; Southeastern Louisiana 19, Northwestern State 13
- Latest meeting: September 26, 2026; Southeastern Louisiana 52, Northwestern State 21
- Trophy: None

Statistics
- Total meetings: 71
- All-time series: SELU, 42–29
- Largest victory: Northwestern State, 87–27 (2003)
- Longest win streak: Southeastern Louisiana, 16 (2012–present)
- Current win streak: Southeastern Louisiana, 16 (2012–present)

Locations of Northwestern State and Southeastern Louisiana

The Northwestern State–Southeastern Louisiana football rivalry is an American college football rivalry between the Northwestern State Demons and the Southeastern Louisiana Lions. Both schools are members of the University of Louisiana System, and compete together as members of the Southland Conference.

The two teams have met 71 times on the football field, and Southeastern Louisiana currently leads the all-time series 42–29.

== Game results ==
Northwestern State victories	Southeastern Louisiana victories

No.	Date	Location	Winner	Score
1	September 20, 1935	Hammond, LA	Southeastern Louisiana	19–13
2	September 25, 1936	Natchitoches, LA	Southeastern Louisiana	34–6
3	October 7, 1938	Natchitoches, LA	Louisiana Normal	6–0
4	October 6, 1939	Hammond, LA	Louisiana Normal	18–6
5	October 4, 1940	Natchitoches, LA	Louisiana Normal	32–0
6	November 1, 1941	Hammond, LA	Louisiana Normal	6–0
7	October 30, 1942	Natchitoches, LA	Louisiana Normal	7–6
8	October 18, 1946	Hammond, LA	Southeastern Louisiana	13–0
9	October 17, 1947	Natchitoches, LA	Northwestern State	14–12
10	October 15, 1948	Hammond, LA	Northwestern State	49–0
11	October 15, 1949	Natchitoches, LA	Southeastern Louisiana	25–13
12	October 28, 1950	Hammond, LA	Southeastern Louisiana	28–14
13	October 27, 1951	Natchitoches, LA	Southeastern Louisiana	33–14
14	October 25, 1952	Hammond, LA	Southeastern Louisiana	19–0
15	October 31, 1953	Natchitoches, LA	Southeastern Louisiana	27–19
16	November 20, 1954	Hammond, LA	Southeastern Louisiana	32–6
17	November 19, 1955	Natchitoches, LA	Southeastern Louisiana	27–20
18	November 17, 1956	Hammond, LA	Southeastern Louisiana	20–15
19	November 23, 1957	Natchitoches, LA	Northwestern State	13–7
20	November 22, 1958	Hammond, LA	Northwestern State	7–0
21	November 21, 1959	Natchitoches, LA	Southeastern Louisiana	15–13
22	November 19, 1960	Natchitoches, LA	Southeastern Louisiana	7–0
23	November 18, 1961	Hammond, LA	Southeastern Louisiana	19–0
24	November 17, 1962	Natchitoches, LA	Northwestern State	19–6
25	November 23, 1963	Hammond, LA	Northwestern State	13–7
26	November 21, 1964	Natchitoches, LA	Southeastern Louisiana	37–21
27	November 20, 1965	Hammond, LA	Northwestern State	38–22
28	November 19, 1966	Natchitoches, LA	Northwestern State	27–24
29	November 18, 1967	Natchitoches, LA	Southeastern Louisiana	26–14
30	November 23, 1968	Natchitoches, LA	Southeastern Louisiana	24–19
31	November 22, 1969	Hammond, LA	Northwestern State	34–6
32	November 21, 1970	Natchitoches, LA	Northwestern State	22–14
33	November 19, 1971	Hammond, LA	Northwestern State	14–6
34	November 25, 1972	Natchitoches, LA	Northwestern State	24–8
35	November 17, 1973	Hammond, LA	Northwestern State	21–14
36	November 23, 1974	Natchitoches, LA	Northwestern State	40–3

No.	Date	Location	Winner	Score
37	November 22, 1975	Hammond, LA	Southeastern Louisiana	31–6
38	November 20, 1976	Natchitoches, LA	Southeastern Louisiana	34–27
39	November 19, 1977	Hammond, LA	Southeastern Louisiana	38–21
40	November 18, 1978	Hammond, LA	Northwestern State	13–12
41	October 13, 1979	Hammond, LA	Southeastern Louisiana	33–7
42	November 22, 1980	Natchitoches, LA	Northwestern State	16–14
43	October 31, 1981	Hammond, LA	Southeastern Louisiana	21–16
44	November 13, 1982	Natchitoches, LA	Northwestern State	31–3
45	November 12, 1983	Natchitoches, LA	Northwestern State	23–7
46	November 10, 1984	Hammond, LA	Northwestern State	34–14
47	November 16, 1985	Hammond, LA	Southeastern Louisiana	20–14
48	October 11, 2003	Natchitoches, LA	Northwestern State	87–27
49	October 15, 2005	Natchitoches, LA	Northwestern State	31–10
50	October 14, 2006	Hammond, LA	Southeastern Louisiana	31–24
51	October 13, 2007	Natchitoches, LA	Northwestern State	27–24
52	October 18, 2008	Hammond, LA	Southeastern Louisiana	26–21
53	November 7, 2009	Natchitoches, LA	Southeastern Louisiana	27–0
54	November 6, 2010	Hammond, LA	Northwestern State	35–16
55	October 15, 2011	Natchitoches, LA	Northwestern State	51–17
56	October 13, 2012	Hammond, LA	Southeastern Louisiana	27–22
57	October 19, 2013	Natchitoches, LA	Southeastern Louisiana	37–22
58	October 4, 2014	Hammond, LA	Southeastern Louisiana	30–22
59	September 3, 2015	Natchitoches, LA	Southeastern Louisiana	34–20
60	September 24, 2016	Hammond, LA	Southeastern Louisiana	34–24
61	September 30, 2017	Natchitoches, LA	Southeastern Louisiana	49–20
62	September 29, 2018	Hammond, LA	Southeastern Louisiana	24–17
63	September 28, 2019	Natchitoches, LA	Southeastern Louisiana	44–27
64	March 13, 2021	Hammond, LA	Southeastern Louisiana	27–24
65	October 23, 2021	Natchitoches, LA	Southeastern Louisiana	51–14
66	November 13, 2021	Hammond, LA	Southeastern Louisiana	56–28
67	November 12, 2022	Hammond, LA	Southeastern Louisiana	23–7
68	October 19, 2023	Natchitoches, LA	Southeastern Louisiana	37–20
69	November 9, 2024	Hammond, LA	Southeastern Louisiana	41–0
70	October 18, 2025	Hammond, LA	Southeastern Louisiana	49–0
71	September 26, 2026	Natchitoches, LA	Southeastern Louisiana	52–21
Series: Southeastern Louisiana leads 42–29

== See also ==
- List of NCAA college football rivalry games
