= Cajun Crown =

American college football rivalry trophy

- Louisiana Ragin' Cajuns McNeese Cowboys
- Sport: Football
- First meeting: September 22, 1951; Southwestern Louisiana 35, McNeese State 14
- Latest meeting: September 6, 2025; Louisiana 34, McNeese 10
- Next meeting: September 2, 2028
- Trophy: Cajun Crown

Statistics
- Total meetings: 39
- All-time series: McNeese leads, 20–17–2
- Largest victory: Southwestern Louisiana, 55–12 (1954)
- Longest win streak: Southwestern Louisiana, 6 (1965–1970)
- Longest unbeaten streak: McNeese, 10 (1973–1982)
- Current win streak: Louisiana, 2 (2016–present)

Locations in Louisiana

The Cajun Crown is the name of the rivalry trophy between the Louisiana Ragin' Cajuns and the McNeese Cowboys.

== History ==
The two teams have met 39 times on the football field, with McNeese currently holding a 20–17–2 edge in the all time series. Originally an annual series, the game has been less frequently played since McNeese moved from the NCAA's Division I-A to Division I-AA in 1982.

== Game results ==
Louisiana victories	McNeese victories	Tie games

No.	Date	Location	Winner	Score
1	September 22, 1951	Lake Charles, LA	Southwestern Louisiana	35–14
2	November 22, 1952	Lake Charles, LA	Southwestern Louisiana	20–13
3	November 21, 1953	Lafayette, LA	Southwestern Louisiana	47–13
4	November 20, 1954	Lake Charles, LA	Southwestern Louisiana	55–12
5	November 19, 1955	Lafayette, LA	McNeese State	12–7
6	November 17, 1956	Lake Charles, LA	Southwestern Louisiana	35–33
7	November 23, 1957	Lafayette, LA	McNeese State	13–0
8	November 22, 1958	Lake Charles, LA	McNeese State	9–8
9	November 21, 1959	Lafayette, LA	Southwestern Louisiana	19–14
10	November 19, 1960	Lake Charles, LA	McNeese State	29–10
11	November 18, 1961	Lafayette, LA	McNeese State	25–0
12	November 17, 1962	Lake Charles, LA	McNeese State	19–0
13	November 23, 1963	Lafayette, LA	McNeese State	14–7
14	November 21, 1964	Lake Charles, LA	McNeese State	24–9
15	November 20, 1965	Lafayette, LA	Southwestern Louisiana	14–7
16	November 19, 1966	Lake Charles, LA	Southwestern Louisiana	7–0
17	November 18, 1967	Lafayette, LA	Southwestern Louisiana	31–6
18	November 23, 1968	Lake Charles, LA	Southwestern Louisiana	12–7
19	November 22, 1969	Lafayette, LA	Southwestern Louisiana	21–17
20	November 21, 1970	Lake Charles, LA	Southwestern Louisiana	13–7
21	November 19, 1971	Lafayette, LA	McNeese State	20–10

No.	Date	Location	Winner	Score
22	November 25, 1972	Lake Charles, LA	Southwestern Louisiana	10–0
23	November 24, 1973	Lafayette, LA	McNeese State	37–0
24	September 21, 1974	Lake Charles, LA	McNeese State	38–0
25	November 22, 1975	Lafayette, LA	McNeese State	33–21
26	November 20, 1976	Lake Charles, LA	McNeese State	20–19
27	November 19, 1977	Lafayette, LA	Tie	9–9
28	November 25, 1978	Lake Charles, LA	McNeese State	44–18
29	November 17, 1979	Lafayette, LA	McNeese State	10–6
30	November 22, 1980	Lake Charles, LA	McNeese State	14–0
31	November 21, 1981	Lafayette, LA	McNeese State	14–7
32	November 20, 1982	Lake Charles, LA	Tie	10–10
33	November 12, 1983	Lafayette, LA	Southwestern Louisiana	48–16
34	November 10, 1984	Lake Charles, LA	McNeese State	30–17
35	November 16, 1985	Lafayette, LA	McNeese State	14–3
36	November 15, 1986	Lake Charles, LA	Southwestern Louisiana	33–13
37	September 15, 2007	Lafayette, LA	McNeese State (FCS #8)	38–17
38	September 10, 2016	Lafayette, LA	Louisiana–Lafayette	30–22
39	September 6, 2025	Lafayette, LA	Louisiana	34–10
Series: McNeese leads 20–17–2
Note: Rankings are from the Sports Network/STATS poll for McNeese after 1982 or AP Poll for either Louisiana since 1973 or McNeese from 1975 to 1981.

== See also ==
- List of NCAA college football rivalry games
