= Cypress Mug =

Football trophy in Louisiana, US

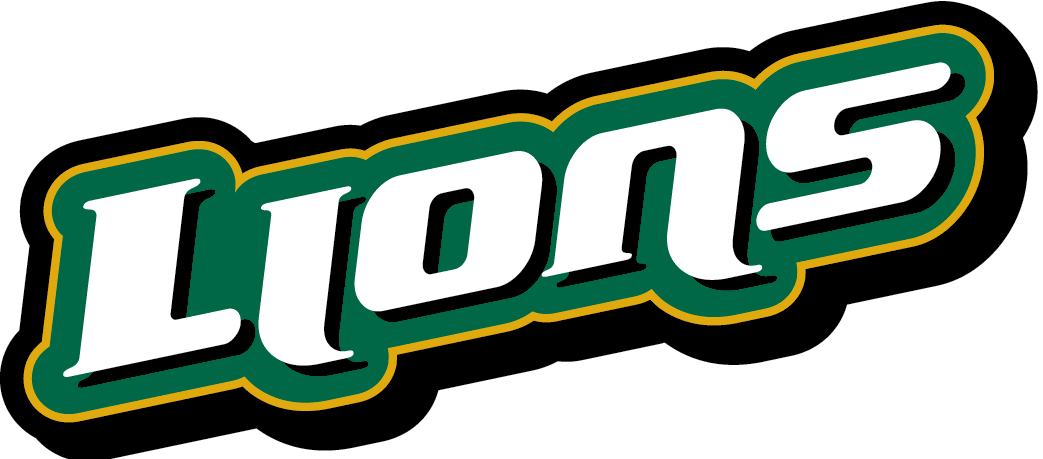
- Louisiana Ragin' Cajuns Southeastern Louisiana Lions
- Sport: Football
- First meeting: November 11, 1930; Southwestern Louisiana 13, Southeastern Louisiana 0
- Latest meeting: September 3, 2022; Louisiana 24, Southeastern Louisiana 7
- Trophy: Cypress Mug

Statistics
- Total meetings: 41
- All-time series: Louisiana leads, 21–17–3
- Largest victory: Southeastern Louisiana, 42–0 (1956)
- Longest win streak: Southeastern Louisiana, 8 (1958–1965)
- Longest unbeaten streak: Southeastern Louisiana, 15 (1951–1965)
- Current win streak: Louisiana, 2 (2017–present)
- Locations in Louisiana

The Cypress Mug is the name of the turned, polished mahogany mug that was awarded to the winner of the annual football game between the Louisiana Ragin' Cajuns (formerly the Southwestern Louisiana Bulldogs) and the Southeastern Louisiana Lions. The two teams have met 40 times on the football field, with the Ragin' Cajuns currently holding a 21–17–3 edge in the all time series. The rivalry had been inactive since the Ragin' Cajuns' move from the NCAA's Division I-AA to Division I-A; however the two teams played each other in 2017 in Lafayette for the first time since 1981, resulting in a 51–48 Cajuns victory and played again for the Ragin' Cajuns' home opener in 2022.

== Game results ==
Louisiana victories	Southeastern Louisiana victories	Tie games

No.	Date	Location	Winner	Score
1	November 11, 1930	Hammond, LA	Southwestern Louisiana	13–0
2	October 3, 1931	Lafayette, LA	Tie	6–6
3	September 30, 1932	Lafayette, LA	Southwestern Louisiana	6–0
4	September 22, 1933	Lafayette, LA	Southwestern Louisiana	34–0
5	October 26, 1934	Lafayette, LA	Southwestern Louisiana	10–0
6	October 4, 1935	Lafayette, LA	Southeastern Louisiana	13–7
7	November 6, 1936	Lafayette, LA	Southeastern Louisiana	19–0
8	September 16, 1938	Hammond, LA	Southwestern Louisiana	8–0
9	September 20, 1940	Lafayette, LA	Southwestern Louisiana	7–0
10	September 19, 1941	Hammond, LA	Southwestern Louisiana	19–7
11	October 9, 1942	Lafayette, LA	Southwestern Louisiana	35–13
12	October 4, 1946	Hammond, LA	Southeastern Louisiana	27–13
13	October 4, 1947	Lafayette, LA	Southwestern Louisiana	40–7
14	October 8, 1948	Hammond, LA	Southwestern Louisiana	19–12
15	October 1, 1949	Hammond, LA	Southwestern Louisiana	27–20
16	September 30, 1950	Lafayette, LA	Southwestern Louisiana	6–0
17	September 29, 1951	Hammond, LA	Southeastern Louisiana	14–0
18	September 27, 1952	Lafayette, LA	Tie	13–13
19	September 26, 1953	Hammond, LA	Southeastern Louisiana	39–13
20	September 25, 1954	Lafayette, LA	Southeastern Louisiana	32–0
21	September 24, 1955	Hammond, LA	Southeastern Louisiana	20–0

No.	Date	Location	Winner	Score
22	September 22, 1956	Lafayette, LA	Southeastern Louisiana	42–0
23	September 21, 1957	Hammond, LA	Tie	7–7
24	September 20, 1958	Lafayette, LA	Southeastern Louisiana	14–6
25	September 18, 1959	Hammond, LA	Southeastern Louisiana	18–13
26	September 17, 1960	Lafayette, LA	Southeastern Louisiana	20–10
27	September 16, 1961	Hammond, LA	Southeastern Louisiana	27–0
28	September 21, 1962	Lafayette, LA	Southeastern Louisiana	21–6
29	September 10, 1963	Hammond, LA	Southeastern Louisiana	14–0
30	December 12, 1964	Lafayette, LA	Southeastern Louisiana	12–7
31	October 2, 1965	Hammond, LA	Southeastern Louisiana	13–0
32	October 1, 1966	Lafayette, LA	Southwestern Louisiana	35–6
33	October 14, 1967	Hammond, LA	Southwestern Louisiana	9–0
34	October 5, 1968	Lafayette, LA	Southwestern Louisiana	31–6
35	October 4, 1969	Hammond, LA	Southwestern Louisiana	9–3
36	September 19, 1970	Lafayette, LA	Southwestern Louisiana	17–6
37	September 18, 1971	Hammond, LA	Southwestern Louisiana	7–6
38	September 16, 1972	Lafayette, LA	Southwestern Louisiana	30–7
39	September 12, 1981	Lafayette, LA	Southeastern Louisiana	7–0
40	September 2, 2017	Lafayette, LA	Louisiana	51–48
41	September 3, 2022	Lafayette, LA	Louisiana	24–7
Series: Louisiana leads 21–17–3

== See also ==
- List of NCAA college football rivalry games
