= Louisiana–Louisiana Tech football rivalry =

American college football rivalry

- Louisiana Ragin' Cajuns Louisiana Tech Bulldogs
- Sport: Football
- First meeting: 1910; Louisiana Tech, 75–0
- Latest meeting: October 10, 2026; Louisiana Tech, 32–31
- Next meeting: 2027, in Lafayette

Statistics
- Total meetings: 88
- All-time series: Louisiana Tech leads, 49–33–6
- Largest victory: Louisiana Tech, 75–0 (1910)
- Longest win streak: Louisiana Tech, 9 (1997–present)
- Current win streak: Louisiana Tech, 9 (1997–present)

Locations of Louisiana Tech and Louisiana

The Louisiana–Louisiana Tech football rivalry is an active American college football rivalry between the Louisiana Tech Bulldogs and the Louisiana Ragin' Cajuns (formerly the Southwestern Louisiana Ragin' Cajuns, and known since the 2017–18 school year as the Louisiana Ragin' Cajuns). The two teams have met 88 times on the football field, with Louisiana Tech currently holding a 49–33–6 lead in the all-time series. After a handful of early meetings, they played virtually every year from 1924 to 2000. The yearly game ended following the Bulldogs' transition to the Western Athletic Conference and the Ragin' Cajuns' to the Sun Belt Conference. They have met four times since, and continue to play each other in other sports. The yearly game will continue starting in 2026 as Louisiana Tech has transition into the Sun Belt Conference West Division, along with Louisiana.

== History ==
The first meeting came in 1910, while both were independent. They were members of the Louisiana Intercollegiate Athletic Association from 1914–1925 and played off and on during that time span. They would remain conference mates through several conferences, namely the Southern Intercollegiate Athletic Association (1926–1941), the Louisiana Intercollegiate Conference (1941–1947), the Gulf States Conference (1948–1970), and the Southland Conference (1971–1981). They played every year of that span dating back to 1924 (with the exception of 1943 due to WWII). This also saw them transition from College Division/Division II to Division I/Division I-A.

In 1982, the Southland Conference downgraded to I-AA. Louisiana Tech remained with the conference, but then-Southwestern Louisiana left the conference to become a Division I-A independent. Louisiana Tech would ultimately leave the Southland to compete as an independent themselves, first in Division I-AA (1987–88) and later Division I-A like Southwestern starting in 1989. Despite being in different divisions, they continued to play every year (except 1987). They remained independent in football until both joined the Big West Conference for football only for a three-year period from 1993–1995. Afterwards they both resumed independence through 2000.

In 2000, Louisiana Tech defeated newly renamed Louisiana–Lafayette 48–14. This would be the end of the annual series that had been played for 76 years. Following the 2000 season, Louisiana Tech became a member of the Western Athletic Conference, while Louisiana–Lafayette became a member of the Sun Belt Conference. They would meet again in 2003–2004. In 2013, Louisiana Tech left the WAC and joined Conference USA, and the two met again in 2014–2015. Louisiana Tech won all four games, extending a win streak starting in 1997. The teams were scheduled to meet in a home-and-home series in 2026 and 2029. However, with Louisiana Tech joining the Sun Belt Conference as a full member no later than July 1, 2027, and being placed in the West Division, the rivalry is now an annual conference game.

== Game results ==
Louisiana Tech victories	Louisiana victories	Tie games

No.	Date	Location	Winner	Score
1	October 29, 1910	Ruston, LA	Louisiana Tech	75–0
2	November 3, 1915	Ruston, LA	Tie	7–7
3	November 18, 1916	Ruston, LA	Southwestern Louisiana	26–0
4	November 17, 1917	Ruston, LA	Southwestern Louisiana	57–0
5	October 30, 1920	Ruston, LA	Louisiana Tech	1–0†
6	November 11, 1921	Ruston, LA	Louisiana Tech	20–0
7	November 15, 1924	Lafayette, LA	Southwestern Louisiana	20–6
8	November 20, 1925	Ruston, LA	Southwestern Louisiana	22–13
9	November 5, 1926	Lafayette, LA	Louisiana Tech	23–0
10	November 5, 1927	Ruston, LA	Louisiana Tech	13–0
11	November 4, 1928	Ruston, LA	Southwestern Louisiana	44–6
12	December 7, 1929	Ruston, LA	Louisiana Tech	24–7
13	October 25, 1930	Ruston, LA	Louisiana Tech	7–0
14	October 17, 1931	Ruston, LA	Louisiana Tech	38–0
15	October 21, 1932	Lafayette, LA	Louisiana Tech	15–0
16	October 14, 1933	Ruston, LA	Southwestern Louisiana	13–7
17	October 12, 1934	Lafayette, LA	Southwestern Louisiana	25–0
18	October 11, 1935	Ruston, LA	Louisiana Tech	25–0
19	October 8, 1936	Lafayette, LA	Louisiana Tech	20–7
20	November 12, 1937	Ruston, LA	Tie	0–0
21	November 4, 1938	Ruston, LA	Southwestern Louisiana	27–7
22	November 4, 1939	Ruston, LA	Southwestern Louisiana	12–6
23	November 1, 1940	Lafayette, LA	Southwestern Louisiana	7–6
24	October 31, 1941	Ruston, LA	Louisiana Tech	12–0
25	October 30, 1942	Lafayette, LA	Southwestern Louisiana	12–7
26	October 14, 1944	Ruston, LA	Southwestern Louisiana	15–0
27	November 18, 1944	Lafayette, LA	Louisiana Tech	7–0
28	October 5, 1945	Lafayette, LA	Louisiana Tech	14–12
29	November 17, 1945	Ruston, LA	Southwestern Louisiana	13–7
30	November 2, 1946	Lafayette, LA	Louisiana Tech	34–6
31	November 1, 1947	Ruston, LA	Louisiana Tech	9–0
32	October 30, 1948	Lafayette, LA	Louisiana Tech	24–14
33	October 29, 1949	Ruston, LA	Louisiana Tech	21–0
34	November 4, 1950	Lafayette, LA	Southwestern Louisiana	41–13
35	November 3, 1951	Ruston, LA	Southwestern Louisiana	34–7
36	November 1, 1952	Lafayette, LA	Tie	19–19
37	October 31, 1953	Ruston, LA	Louisiana Tech	27–7
38	October 30, 1954	Lafayette, LA	Southwestern Louisiana	25–0
39	October 29, 1955	Ruston, LA	Louisiana Tech	28–14
40	October 27, 1956	Lafayette, LA	Louisiana Tech	33–6
41	October 12, 1957	Ruston, LA	Louisiana Tech	28–13
42	October 11, 1958	Lafayette, LA	Louisiana Tech	33–0
43	October 10, 1959	Ruston, LA	Louisiana Tech	21–13
44	October 8, 1960	Lafayette, LA	Southwestern Louisiana	6–2
45	October 7, 1961	Ruston, LA	Louisiana Tech	12–0

No.	Date	Location	Winner	Score
46	October 6, 1962	Lafayette, LA	Southwestern Louisiana	13–6
47	October 12, 1963	Ruston, LA	Louisiana Tech	45–0
48	October 10, 1964	Lafayette, LA	Louisiana Tech	6–3
49	October 9, 1965	Ruston, LA	Southwestern Louisiana	16–8
50	October 15, 1966	Lafayette, LA	Southwestern Louisiana	21–12
51	October 7, 1967	Ruston, LA	Southwestern Louisiana	20–14
52	October 12, 1968	Lafayette, LA	Southwestern Louisiana	28–24
53	October 11, 1969	Ruston, LA	Louisiana Tech	34–21
54	October 10, 1970	Lafayette, LA	Southwestern Louisiana	20–10
55	October 9, 1971	Ruston, LA	Louisiana Tech	35–15
56	September 9, 1972	Lafayette, LA	Louisiana Tech	7–0
57	September 22, 1973	Ruston, LA	Louisiana Tech	23–0
58	October 12, 1974	Lafayette, LA	Louisiana Tech	35–20
59	October 11, 1975	Ruston, LA	Louisiana Tech	24–14
60	October 2, 1976	Lafayette, LA	Southwestern Louisiana	31–26
61	October 8, 1977	Ruston, LA	Tie	21–21
62	October 7, 1978	Lafayette, LA	Southwestern Louisiana	24–6
63	October 6, 1979	Ruston, LA	Louisiana Tech	17–0
64	November 15, 1980	Lafayette, LA	Southwestern Louisiana	27–9
65	October 31, 1981	Ruston, LA	Tie	17–17
66	November 13, 1982	Lafayette, LA	Southwestern Louisiana	29–19
67	November 19, 1983	Lafayette, LA	Southwestern Louisiana	13–9
68	September 8, 1984	Ruston, LA	Southwestern Louisiana	17–16
69	September 14, 1985	Ruston, LA	Louisiana Tech	24–23
70	November 22, 1986	Lafayette, LA	Louisiana Tech	23–14
71	October 8, 1988	Ruston, LA	Louisiana Tech	19–16
72	September 2, 1989	Lafayette, LA	Louisiana Tech	40–14
73	September 29, 1990	Ruston, LA	Louisiana Tech	24–10
74	October 26, 1991	Lafayette, LA	Tie	14–14
75	October 10, 1992	Ruston, LA	Louisiana Tech	21–7
76	November 27, 1993	Lafayette, LA	Southwestern Louisiana	21–17
77	October 1, 1994	Ruston, LA	Southwestern Louisiana	13–3
78	November 4, 1995	Lafayette, LA	Southwestern Louisiana	40–33
79	September 28, 1996	Ruston, LA	Southwestern Louisiana	37–31
80	November 15, 1997	Lafayette, LA	Louisiana Tech	63–24
81	September 19, 1998	Ruston, LA	Louisiana Tech	77–14
82	October 2, 1999	Lafayette, LA	Louisiana Tech	41–31
83	October 14, 2000	Ruston, LA	Louisiana Tech	48–14
84	September 6, 2003	Lafayette, LA	Louisiana Tech	34–3
85	September 11, 2004	Ruston, LA	Louisiana Tech	24–20
86	September 6, 2014	Lafayette, LA	Louisiana Tech	48–20
87	October 3, 2015	Ruston, LA	Louisiana Tech	43–14
88	October 10, 2026	Ruston, LA	Louisiana Tech	32–31
Series: Louisiana Tech leads 49–33–6
† Louisiana forfeited.

== See also ==
- List of NCAA college football rivalry games
