= Strawberry Stadium =

Louisiana stadium

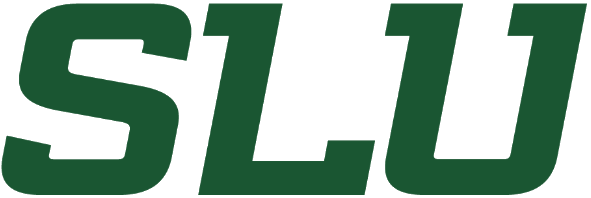

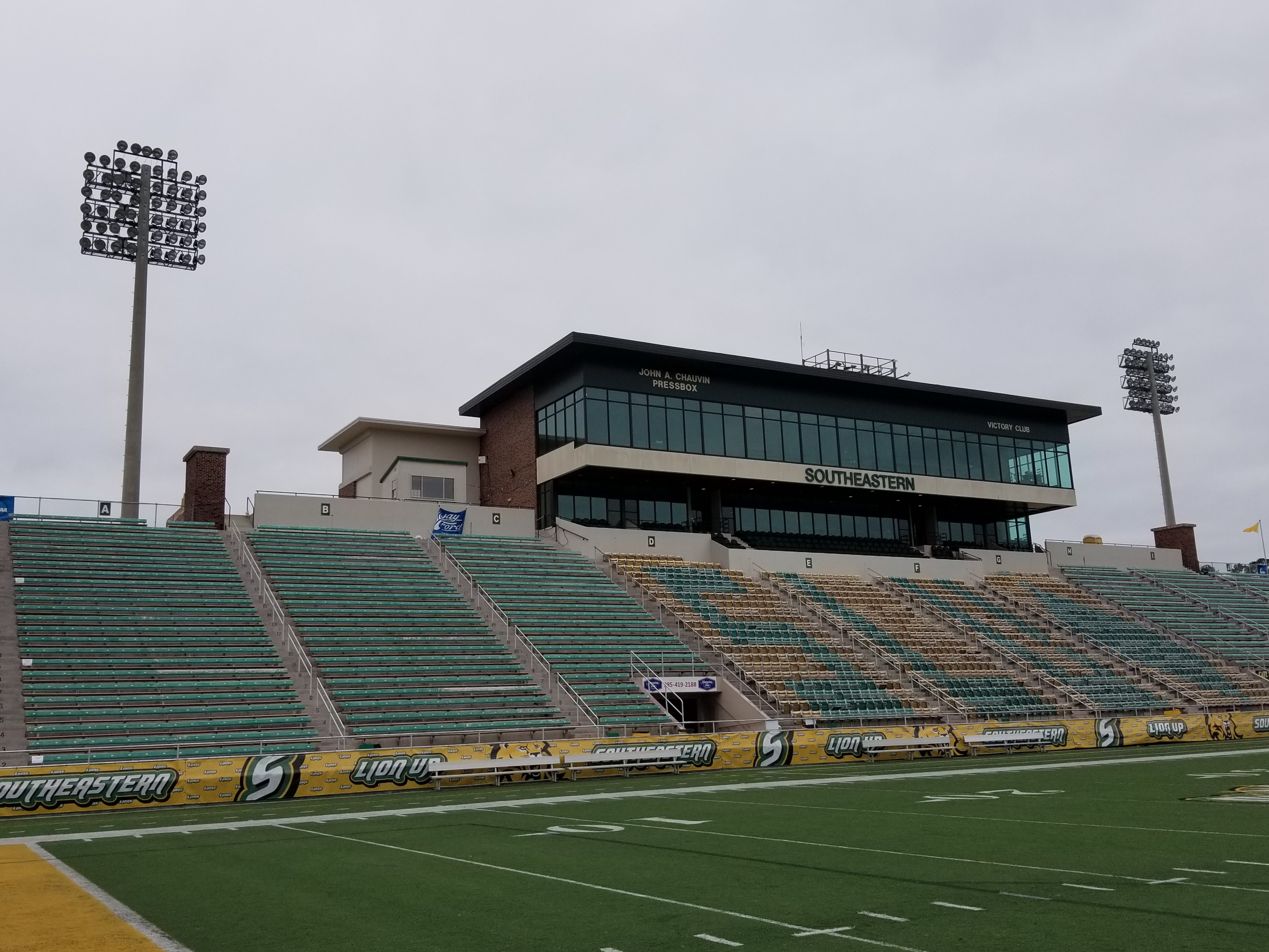
- View of the stadium stands and field in 2019
- Interactive map of Strawberry Stadium
- Address: Hammond, LA; United States
- Location: 910 North Hazel Street
- Coordinates: 30°30′39″N 90°28′6″W
- Owner: Southeastern Louisiana University
- Operator: SLU Athletics
- Capacity: 7,408 (2003–present); 8,396 (1970–2002); 7,200 (1937–1969)
- Executive suites: Victory Club (116 seats) and five suites (15 seats each)
- Type: Stadium
- Surface: artificial turf (2003–present); Grass (1937–2003)
- Current use: Football; Soccer; Track and field

Construction
- Groundbreaking: May 12, 1937
- Opened: September 17, 1937; 88 years ago
- Cost: $144,000 ($3.23 million in 2025 dollars)

Tenants
- SLU Lions (NCAA) teams: football, track and field (1936–present); St. Thomas Aquinas High School (LHSAA); Hammond High School (LHSAA) (1937–1995)

Website
- lionsports.net/strawberry-stadium

Strawberry Stadium is a stadium in Hammond, Louisiana, on the campus of Southeastern Louisiana University. Opened in 1937 and with a current capacity of 7,408, it serves as home to the SLU Lions football, soccer, and track and field teams.

The stadium also hosts other institutions such as St. Thomas Aquinas Catholic High School football, previously hosted Hammond High School football, and has been the site of numerous play-off games involving other schools from Tangipahoa Parish.

== History ==
The facility was constructed in 1937 as part of Franklin D. Roosevelt's WPA program under Project 1304. The steel and concrete structure was built to hold 8,500 spectators and included 36 dorm rooms to house 144 students. Additional facilities in the stadium include a social room, café, music rooms, a band room, and dressing rooms for several sports teams. Construction of the stadium took just 16 weeks, in part due Governor Richard Leche's strong backing of the project. At Leche's direction, workers were pulled from other construction projects in the area to work on the stadium, and crews worked day and night on the facility.

With the governor in attendance, the stadium was christened on September 17, 1937, with a game against Louisiana State University. Reportedly, Leche initially planned to name the stadium after himself, but instead it was named "Strawberry Stadium" to honor local farmers. A plaque on the north end of East Stadium notes Gov. Leche's contribution to the university.

=== Renovations ===
A renovation completed prior to the 2008 football season added club seating, six luxury suites, each accommodating 15 fans, as well as 116 seats outside of the Victory Club. The renovation also increased the press box size. In addition, a new multilevel parking garage for 500 vehicles was constructed to the west of the stadium and connected to it.

Before the 2012 season, new turf was installed after being used at the Mercedes-Benz Superdome.

== Notable events ==
The 1975 Louisiana High School Athletic Association Class AAAA state championship game was contested at Strawberry Stadium. St. Augustine, New Orleans' all-black, all-male Catholic high school, won its first LHSAA championship by defeating Covington High 35–13. Covington originally planned to host the title game at its 6,000-seat stadium in neighboring St. Tammany Parish, but estimates of a crowd larger than the Lions' facility could handle prompted the move to Hammond.

== See also ==
- List of NCAA Division I FCS football stadiums
