= McNaspy Stadium =

Stadium in Lafayette, Louisiana

Coordinates: 30°12′37″N 92°1′13″W

McNaspy Stadium was a 4,500-seat stadium built on the campus of the University of Louisiana at Lafayette (then called Southwestern Louisiana Institute) built in 1940, and remained the home for the school's football team until 1971. The stadium was located to the southwest of Earl K. Long Gymnasium, which had been built the previous year, and consisted of a large home grandstand on the north side and bleachers on the south, with a cinder track surrounded by hedges in the end zones. The grandstand had arches along its top (to reflect the arches in the "arcade" along the Quad, built at roughly the same time), and also contained men's dorm space, weight rooms, locker rooms, etc. The field was oriented in a northeast–southwest direction, mirroring the street grid of the rest of the campus. It was named for the first athletic director and football coach at the university, Clement "C. J" McNaspy. The Camellia Bowl was held there in 1948.

Replaced by Cajun Field in 1971, the stadium was demolished in 2000 to make room for Oliver Hall, named after James R. Oliver, who created the computer science department at UL. Oliver Hall houses the university's computer science department.

Between 1971 and 2000 the stadium was used by the university's men's soccer team until the mid-1980s, as well as for various other functions. It remained a popular place among students to jog along the track, as well as the stands being used so often as a place to tan on that "McNaspy Beach" was a common nickname. It was also temporarily used by the Pride of Acadiana as a practice field while a new parking garage was built on Hamilton Field, near the Angelle Hall where the music department is located. The band has since returned to a reconfigured Hamilton Field.

Recently, trees were planted in the area that used to be mid-field during the McNaspy era, but will now be part of a new "Quad," once the planned buildings are constructed on either side of Oliver Hall.
