= Gulf States Conference =

US intercollegiate football conference

- Founded: 1948
- Folded: 1971
- No. of teams: 11 total
- Region: Gulf South

The Gulf States Conference (GSC) was an intercollegiate athletic football conference that existed from 1948 to 1971. The league had members in Alabama, Louisiana, and Mississippi. Many of the league's members from Louisiana joined after the Louisiana Intercollegiate Conference disbanded after the 1947 season.

== Member schools ==
=== Final members ===
Institution	Nickname	Location	Founded	Type	Joined	Left	Current conference
Louisiana Tech University	Bulldogs	Ruston, Louisiana	1894	Public	1948	1971	C-USA (Sun Belt in 2026) (NCAA Division I)
McNeese State University	Cowboys	Lake Charles, Louisiana	1939	Public	1952	1971	Southland (NCAA Division I)
Nicholls State University	Colonels	Thibodaux, Louisiana	1948	Public	1965	1971	Southland (NCAA Division I)
Northeast Louisiana University (Note: Currently known as the University of Louisiana at Monroe.)	Indians (Note: Currently nickname is now known as the Warhawks.)	Monroe, Louisiana	1931	Public	1953	1971	Sun Belt (NCAA Division I)
Northwestern State University	Demons	Natchitoches, Louisiana	1884	Public	1948	1971	Southland (NCAA Division I)
Southeastern Louisiana University	Lions	Hammond, Louisiana	1925	Public	1948	1971	Southland (NCAA Division I)
University of Southwestern Louisiana (Note: Currently known as the University of Louisiana at Lafayette.)	Bulldogs (Note: Currently nickname is now known as the Ragin' Cajuns.)	Lafayette, Louisiana	1898	Public	1948	1971	Sun Belt (NCAA Division I)

=== Other members ===
Institution	Nickname	Location	Founded	Type	Joined	Left	Current conference
Centenary College of Louisiana	Gentlemen	Shreveport, Louisiana	1825	Private	1948	1954	SCAC (NCAA Division III)
Louisiana College (Note: Currently known as Louisiana Christian University.)	Wildcats	Pineville, Louisiana	1906	Private	1948	1956	RRAC (NAIA)
Loyola University New Orleans	Wolfpack	New Orleans, Louisiana	1904	Private	1948	1952	SSAC (NAIA)
Mississippi Southern College (Note: Currently known as the University of Southern Mississippi.)	Southerners (Note: Currently nickname is now known as the Golden Eagles.)	Hattiesburg, Mississippi	1910	Public	1948	1952	Sun Belt (NCAA Division I)
Spring Hill College	Badgers	Mobile, Alabama	1830	Private	1948	1954	SIAC (NCAA Division II)

== Football champions ==
- 1948 – Mississippi Southern
- 1949 – Louisiana Tech
- 1950 – Mississippi Southern
- 1951 – Mississippi Southern
- 1952 – Louisiana Tech, Southeastern Louisiana, and Southwestern Louisiana
- 1953 – Louisiana Tech, Northwestern State, and Southeastern Louisiana
- 1954 – Southeastern Louisiana
- 1955 – Louisiana Tech
- 1956 – Southeastern Louisiana
- 1957 – Louisiana Tech, McNeese State, and Northwestern State
- 1958 – Louisiana Tech and Northwestern State
- 1959 – Louisiana Tech
- 1960 – Louisiana Tech and Southeastern Louisiana
- 1961 – McNeese State and Southeastern Louisiana
- 1962 – Northwestern State
- 1963 – McNeese State
- 1964 – Louisiana Tech
- 1965 – McNeese State and Southeastern Louisiana
- 1966 – Northwestern State
- 1967 – McNeese State
- 1968 – Southwestern Louisiana
- 1969 – Louisiana Tech
- 1970 – Southwestern Louisiana
