= 1960 Bluebonnet Bowl =

| Texas Longhorns | Alabama Crimson Tide |
| (7–3) | (8–1–1) |
| 3 | 3 |
| Head coach: Darrell Royal | Head coach: Bear Bryant |
| AP / Coaches; NR / 17 | AP / Coaches; 9 / 10 |
| | 1 | 2 | 3 | 4 | Total |
|---|---|---|---|---|---|
| Texas | 0 | 0 | 0 | 3 | 3 |
| Alabama | 0 | 0 | 3 | 0 | 3 |
- Date: December 17, 1960
- Season: 1960
- Stadium: Rice Stadium
- Location: Houston, Texas
- Favorite: Alabama by 1
- Attendance: 68,000

United States TV coverage
- Network: CBS

The 1960 Bluebonnet Bowl, part of the 1960 bowl game season, was the second annual contest and took place on December 17, 1960, at Rice Stadium in Houston. The competing teams were the Alabama Crimson Tide, representing the Southeastern Conference (SEC), and the Texas Longhorns, representing the Southwest Conference (SWC). In a defensive struggle, the game ended in a 3–3 tie.

== Teams ==
=== Alabama ===
The 1960 squad was Bear Bryant's third at Alabama. The Crimson Tide lost to Tennessee and tied Tulane in route to an 8–1–1 regular season. They accepted an invitation to play in the Bluebonnet Bowl against Texas following their 3–0 victory over long-time rival Auburn November 26. The appearance was the fourteenth overall bowl appearance and the first in the Bluebonnet Bowl for Alabama.

=== Texas ===
The 1960 Texas squad finished the regular season 7–3. The Longhorns lost to Nebraska, Arkansas and Rice. They accepted an invitation to play in the Bluebonnet Bowl against Alabama following their 21–14 victory over long-time rival Texas A&M on November 24. The appearance was the tenth overall bowl appearance and the first in the Bluebonnet Bowl for Texas.

== Game summary ==
The only points were scored on a pair of field goals. The first came in the third by Tommy Booker for Alabama and the second in the fourth by Dan Petty for Texas.

Scoring summary

| Quarter | Time | Drive | | | Team | Scoring information | Score | |
| Quarter | Time | Plays | Yards | TOP | Team | Scoring information | Texas | Alabama |
|---|---|---|---|---|---|---|---|---|
| 3 | 7:21 | 7 | 21 | | Alabama | 30-yard field goal by Tommy Booker | 0 | 3 |
| 4 | 3:44 | 13 | 71 | | Texas | 20-yard field goal by Dan Petty | 3 | 3 |
| "TOP" = time of possession. For other American football terms, see Glossary of American football. | | | | | | | 3 | 3 |
