= Larry Libertore =

American football player (1939–2017)

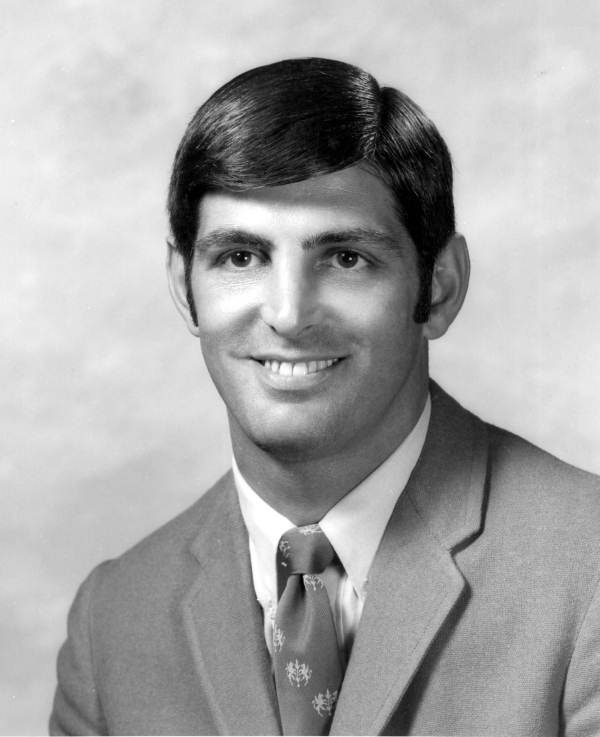
- Libertore in 1970

No. 14
- Position: Quarterback / Halfback

Personal information
- Born: November 18, 1939; Canton, Ohio, U.S.
- Died: December 25, 2017 (aged 78); Lakeland, Florida, U.S.
- Listed height: 5 ft 8 in (1.73 m)
- Listed weight: 138 lb (63 kg)

Career information
- High school: Miami Edison
- College: Florida (1960–1962)

Awards and highlights
- Second-team All-SEC (1960); University of Florida Athletics Hall of Fame; Gator Bowl MVP (1960)

Lawrence Paul "Lightning" Libertore Jr. (November 18, 1939 – December 25, 2017) was an American college football player, real-estate agent and politician in the state of Florida.

== Early life ==
Libertore was born on November 18, 1939, in Canton, Ohio, to Lawrence Paul Libertore Sr. and Jean Maggiore Libertore. He is the eldest of three children. His siblings are Douglas Libertore and Lana Jacobs Swartzwelder.

His family moved to Miami, Florida, when he was in ninth grade. Libertore played football at Miami Edison High School. At Miami Edison High, Libertore was recruited with a football scholarship to attend the University of Florida.

== University of Florida ==
At the University of Florida, Libertore was a Sigma Nu fraternity member. On coach Ray Graves Florida Gators football team, Libertore was an option quarterback and defensive back. Libertore was a small player at just 138 pounds. As Libertore once recalled, "They always had trouble getting equipment to fit me." In his first game against George Washington, he used tape to keep his pants from falling down.

But he was fast. Libertore's 786 rushing yards remained the most by a Gators quarterback until eclipsed by Tim Tebow in 2007. Libertore was inducted into the University of Florida Athletics Hall of Fame as a "Gator Great" in 2005.

Libertore led the Gators to a record 9 wins in 1960, placing second among the twelve SEC teams—their best-ever SEC finish at that time. In Libertore's first ever game as a sophomore, at Tiger Stadium, Libertore made a criss-crossing 66-yard touchdown run on the first play from scrimmage to help lead the Gators to a 13–10 victory over LSU. The Gators offense stalled after Libertore's run, and the defense stole the LSU quarterback's wristband and studied it at halftime. In the 18–17 upset of Bobby Dodd's tenth-ranked Georgia Tech Yellow Jackets, the Gators, led by Libertore, drop-back passer Bobby Dodd Jr., and running back Lindy Infante, gambled on a successful two-point conversion for the last-minute win. A pass from Libertore to fullback Jon MacBeth won the game. Libertore also led the Gators to a win over Fran Tarkenton and the Georgia Bulldogs. The season closed with a hard-fought 13–12 victory over the twelfth-ranked Baylor Bears in the Gator Bowl on New Year's Eve 1960. Baylor dropped a pass for the two-point conversion and the win. Libertore was the game's MVP.

In 1962, Libertore hurt his knee in a loss to Georgia Tech, and did not play quarterback again. Libertore helped the Gators to defeat Penn State alongside Larry Dupree in the 1962 Gator Bowl from the halfback position.

== Political career ==
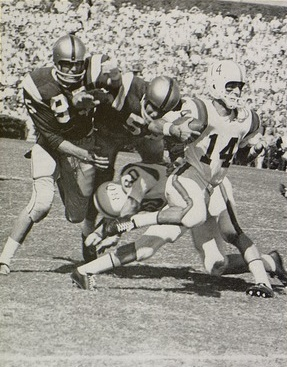
Libertore running on Florida State

Libertore served in the Florida House of Representatives from 1970 to 1974 from District 51. He was a Democrat. He served as a County Commissioner of Polk County from 1984 to 1992 and served as chairman of the county commission.

== Personal life ==
After graduating from the University of Florida, Libertore moved to Lakeland, Florida where he received his real estate license. He married Marla Deniece Jones and had three children: Lisa, Christy, and Larry III.

Libertore died on December 25, 2017, in Lakeland, Florida, at the age of 78, following a brief illness.

== See also ==
- List of University of Florida Athletic Hall of Fame members
