= Wendell H. Watson =

American politician (1924–1989)

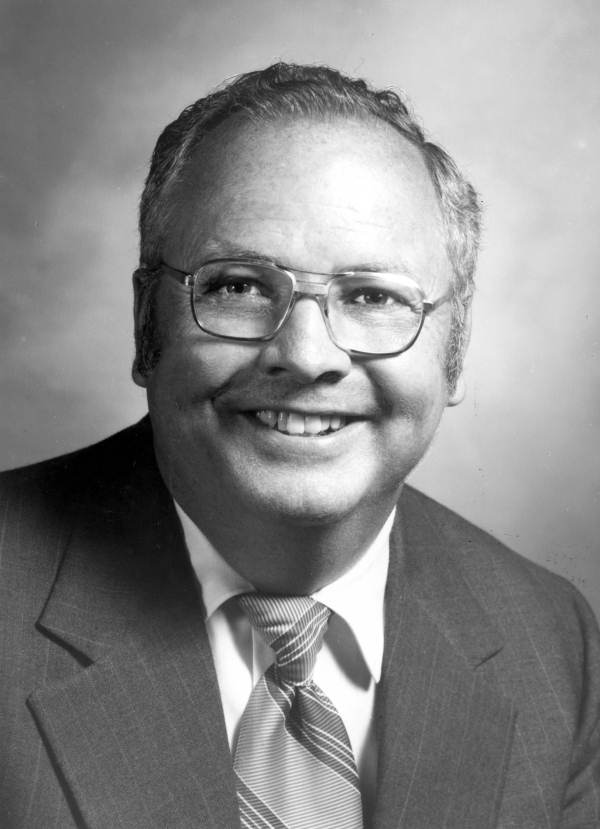
- Watson in 1974

Member of the Florida House of Representatives from the 51st district
- In office 1974–1976
- Preceded by: Larry Libertore
- Succeeded by: Gene Ready

Personal details
- Born: September 9, 1924 Howey-in-the-Hills, Florida, U.S.
- Died: April 16, 1989 (aged 64)
- Party: Democratic
- Education: University of Florida; Florida Southern College

Wendell H. Watson (September 9, 1924 – April 16, 1989) was an American politician. He served as a Democratic member for the 51st district of the Florida House of Representatives.

== Life and career ==
Watson was born in Howey-in-the-Hills, Florida. He attended the University of Florida and Florida Southern College.

In 1974, Watson was elected to represent the 51st district of the Florida House of Representatives, succeeding Larry Libertore. He served until 1976, when he was succeeded by Gene Ready.

Watson died on April 16, 1989, at the age of 64.
