= 1960 Alabama Crimson Tide football team =

American college football season

1960 Alabama Crimson Tide football

Bluebonnet Bowl, T 3–3 vs. Texas
- Conference: Southeastern Conference

Ranking
- Coaches: No. 10
- AP: No. 9
- Record: 8–1–2 (5–1–1 SEC)
- Head coach: Bear Bryant (3rd season)
- Captains: Leon Fuller; Bobby Boylston
- Home stadium: Denny Stadium; Legion Field

1960 Southeastern Conference football standings
	Conf.					Overall
Team	W		L		T	W		L		T
No. 2 Ole Miss $	5	–	0	–	1	10	–	0	–	1
No. 18 Florida	5	–	1	–	0	9	–	2	–	0
No. 9 Alabama	5	–	1	–	1	8	–	1	–	2
No. 13 Auburn	5	–	2	–	0	8	–	2	–	0
Tennessee	3	–	2	–	2	6	–	2	–	2
Georgia	4	–	3	–	0	6	–	4	–	0
Georgia Tech	4	–	4	–	0	5	–	5	–	0
LSU	2	–	3	–	1	5	–	4	–	1
Kentucky	2	–	4	–	1	5	–	4	–	1
Tulane	1	–	4	–	1	3	–	6	–	1
Mississippi State	0	–	5	–	1	2	–	6	–	1
Vanderbilt	0	–	7	–	0	3	–	7	–	0
$ – Conference champion; Rankings from AP Poll

The 1960 Alabama Crimson Tide football team (variously "Alabama", "UA" or "Bama") represented the University of Alabama in the 1960 college football season. It was the Crimson Tide's 66th overall and 27th season as a member of the Southeastern Conference (SEC). The team was led by head coach Bear Bryant, in his third year, and played their home games at Denny Stadium in Tuscaloosa and Legion Field in Birmingham, Alabama. They finished with a record of eight wins, one loss and two ties (8–1–2 overall, 5–1–1 in the SEC) and with a tie against Texas in the Bluebonnet Bowl.

After Alabama upset Georgia in week one, they entered the polls for the first time at the No. 5 position for their game against Tulane. However, they tied the Green Wave and dropped to No. 15 prior to their win over Vanderbilt. The next week, Alabama was upset in Knoxville by Tennessee and as a result exited the polls. The Crimson Tide then proceeded to win all six of their regular season games that remained.

After a victories over Houston on homecoming and on the road at Mississippi State, Alabama scored their most points in a game since the 1952 season when they defeated Furman 51–0. After an unsuccessful bid to allow for a "sudden death" overtime period in the event of a tie in their game against Georgia Tech, Alabama defeated both the Yellow Jackets in Atlanta and Tampa at home prior to their victory over Auburn in the Iron Bowl. The Crimson Tide then closed the season with a tie against Texas in the Bluebonnet Bowl.

== Schedule ==
Date	Opponent	Rank	Site	TV	Result	Attendance	Source
September 17	No. 13 Georgia		Legion Field; Birmingham, AL (rivalry)	ABC	W 21–6	36,000	
September 24	at Tulane	No. 5	Tulane Stadium; New Orleans, LA		T 6–6	43,000	
October 1	Vanderbilt	No. 15	Legion Field; Birmingham, AL		W 21–0	41,000	
October 15	at Tennessee	No. 15	Shields–Watkins Field; Knoxville, TN (Third Saturday in October)		L 7–20	46,000	
October 22	Houston*^{†}		Denny Stadium; Tuscaloosa, AL		W 14–0	30,000	
October 29	at Mississippi State		Scott Field; Starkville, MS (rivalry)		W 7–0	25,000	
November 5	Furman*		Denny Stadium; Tuscaloosa, AL		W 51–0	20,000	
November 12	at Georgia Tech		Grant Field; Atlanta, GA (rivalry)		W 16–15	44,006	
November 19	Tampa*	No. 18	Denny Stadium; Tuscaloosa, AL		W 34–6	19,000	
November 26	vs. No. 8 Auburn	No. 17	Legion Field; Birmingham, AL (Iron Bowl)		W 3–0	46,000	
December 17	vs. Texas*	No. 9	Rice Stadium; Houston, TX (Bluebonnet Bowl)	ABC	T 3–3	70,000	
*Non-conference game; ^{†}Homecoming; Rankings from AP Poll released prior to the game

== Game summaries ==
=== Georgia ===
Team	1	2	3	4	Total
• Alabama	0	21	0	0	21
#13 Georgia	0	0	0	6	6

- Date: September 17
- Location: Legion Field
  Birmingham, Alabama
- Game attendance: 36,000

To open the 1960 season, the Crimson Tide scored 21 second quarter points en route to a 21–6 upset over the Georgia Bulldogs at Legion Field. After a scoreless first quarter, touchdowns were scored on a three-yard run by Tommy White and on runs of one and nine-yards by Bobby Skelton that made the halftime score 21–0. Alabama never relinquished the lead, but Georgia ended the shutout bid late in the fourth quarter when Fran Tarkenton threw a three-yard touchdown pass to Dan Davis that made the final score 21–6.

=== Tulane ===
Team	1	2	3	4	Total
#5 Alabama	0	0	0	6	6
Tulane	0	6	0	0	6

- Date: September 24
- Location: Tulane Stadium
  New Orleans
- Game attendance: 43,000

After their upset victory over Georgia in their first game of the season, Alabama entered the polls for the first time of the season at the No. 5 position. In their first road game of the season, the Crimson Tide scored a touchdown in the final minute that prevented an upset by the Tulane Green Wave in this 6–6 tie at New Orleans. After a scoreless first quarter, Tulane took a 6–0 halftime lead after Tommy Mason scored on a three-yard touchdown run. Pat Trammell tied the game in the final minute with his four-yard touchdown run, but the game then ended in a tie after a failed extra point by the Crimson Tide.

=== Vanderbilt ===
Team	1	2	3	4	Total
Vanderbilt	0	0	0	0	0
• #15 Alabama	0	0	15	6	21

- Date: October 1
- Location: Legion Field
  Birmingham, Alabama
- Game attendance: 41,000

After their tie against Tulane, Alabama dropped ten spots to the No. 15 position in the AP Poll prior to their game against Vanderbilt. In their game against the Commodores, the Crimson Tide rallied to a 21–0 victory after being held scoreless in the first half. Billy Richardson scored the first points of the game with his one-yard touchdown run in the third quarter. Later in the quarter, Alabama's lead was extended further to 9–0 after Charles Binkley snapped the ball over the head of Russell Morris on a punt attempt and out of the endzone for a safety. The Crimson Tide then took the free kick that ensued 49-yards for a touchdown with the points made on a 36-yard Bobby Skelton touchdown pass to Norbie Ronsonet for a 15–0 lead. The last touchdown of the game came in the final minute of the fourth quarter when Bud Moore returned an interception 32-yards and made the final score 21–0.

=== Tennessee ===
Third Saturday in October

Team	1	2	3	4	Total
#15 Alabama	0	7	0	0	7
• Tennessee	14	6	0	0	20

- Date: October 15
- Location: Shields–Watkins Field
  Knoxville, Tennessee
- Game attendance: 46,000

In their annual rivalry game against Tennessee, early turnovers proved costly for the Crimson Tide in this 20–7 loss to the Volunteers at Knoxville. Ray Abruzzese fumbled the first play of the game for Alabama to set up the Vols' first score on an eight-yard Bill Majors touchdown pass to Charles Wyrick. Later in the first quarter, Tennessee took a 14–0 lead after a Tommy White fumble was recovered by Cotton Letner and returned 41-yards for a touchdown. After a three-yard Glenn Glass touchdown early in the second quarter made the Volunteers' lead 20–0, Alabama responded with their only points of the game on a 13-yard Laurien Stapp touchdown pass to Leon Fuller that made the final margin 20–6.

=== Houston ===
Team	1	2	3	4	Total
Houston	0	0	0	0	0
• Alabama	14	0	0	0	14

- Date: October 22
- Location: Denny Stadium
  Tuscaloosa, Alabama
- Game attendance: 30,000

A week after their first loss of the season at Tennessee, the Crimson Tide returned home and shutout the Houston Cougars 14–0 on homecoming in Tuscaloosa. Both Crimson Tide touchdowns were set up after Cougar turnovers gave them good field position. The first touchdown was set up after Lee Roy Jordan recovered a Charlie Rieves fumble at the Cougars' 31-yard line. Eight plays later Alabama led 7–0 after Laurien Stapp scored on a one-yard run. On the Houston drive that ensued, Billy Richardson intercepted a Don Sessions pass and returned it to the Cougars' 18-yard line. Four plays later Alabama scored what proved to be the final points of the game on a one-yard Richardson run.

=== Mississippi State ===
Team	1	2	3	4	Total
• Alabama	7	0	0	0	7
Mississippi State	0	0	0	0	0

- Date: October 29
- Location: Scott Field
  Starkville, Mississippi
- Game attendance: 25,000

On homecoming in Starkville, Alabama scored their only touchdown in the first quarter and shutout the Mississippi State Maroons 7–0. The Crimson Tide scored the lone points of the game on their second offensive possession when Pat Trammell scored on an 18-yard touchdown run.

=== Furman ===
Team	1	2	3	4	Total
Furman	0	0	0	0	0
• Alabama	7	14	8	22	51

- Date: November 5
- Location: Denny Stadium
  Tuscaloosa, Alabama
- Game attendance: 20,000

Against the Furman Paladins, Alabama scored their most points in a game since the 1953 Orange Bowl in this 51–0 victory at Denny Stadium. After Bobby Skelton threw and eight-yard touchdown pass to Butch Wilson in the first, he followed it with a three-yard touchdown pass to Richard O’Dell in the second quarter. Pat Trammell then made the halftime score 21–0 with his one-yard run late in the half. After a one-yard Cotton Clark touchdown run extended the Alabama lead to 29–0 in the third, the Crimson Tide scored 22 fourth quarter points to win 51–0. Fourth quarter points were scored on a blocked punt for a safety, and touchdowns on a 62-yard Walter Cureton touchdown run, a 52-yard Laurien Stapp pass to Jerry Spruiell and a five-yard Stapp run.

=== Georgia Tech ===
Team	1	2	3	4	Total
• Alabama	0	0	6	10	16
Georgia Tech	6	9	0	0	15

- Date: November 12
- Location: Grant Field
  Atlanta
- Game attendance: 44,006

Behind a 24-yard game-winning Richard O’Dell field goal with only six seconds left in the game, the Crimson Tide upset the Georgia Tech Yellow Jackets 16–15 at Grant Field. Tech dominated the first half and built a 15–0 halftime lead over Alabama. They scored on an eight-yard Jimmy Nail touchdown run, a 47-yard Thomas Wells field goal and on a three-yard Stanley Gann touchdown run. Alabama responded in the third quarter with a one-yard Leon Fuller touchdown run that cut the Jackets' lead to 15–6. The Crimson Tide then closed the game with a three-yard Bobby Skelton touchdown pass to Norbie Ronsonet and the 24-yard O'Dell field goal as time expired to win 16–15.

In the week that led into this game, Bear Bryant and Georgia Tech head coach Bobby Dodd agreed to make a request to then SEC commissioner Bernie Moore to allow for a "sudden death" overtime period in the event the game was tied at the end of regulation. At the time, it marked the first time that an overtime period was formally requested by college football teams. Ultimately, Moore denied the request and cited that as a conference he was unable to violate existing NCAA rules that specified only 60 minutes for football games.

=== Tampa ===
Team	1	2	3	4	Total
Tampa	0	0	6	0	6
• #18 Alabama	6	12	8	8	34

- Date: November 19
- Location: Denny Stadium
  Tuscaloosa, Alabama
- Game attendance: 19,000

After their upset over Georgia Tech, Alabama reentered the AP Poll at the No. 18 position in the week leading to their game against Tampa. In what was the first and only meeting against the Spartans, Alabama won 34–6 in the final Denny Stadium game of the season. The Crimson Tide took an 18–0 halftime lead after they scored three first half touchdowns. The first was on a one-yard Mike Fracchia run, the second on a one-yard Pat Trammell run and the third on a 30-yard Bobby Skelton pass to Bill Oliver. After a one-yard Laurien Stapp run in the third extended the Alabama lead to 26–0, Tampa scored their only points on a three-yard Ronnie Perez touchdown pass to Charles Truelock. The Crimson Tide then closed the game win a second, one-yard Trammell touchdown run and won 34–6.

=== Auburn ===
Iron Bowl

Team	1	2	3	4	Total
#8 Auburn	0	0	0	0	0
• #17 Alabama	0	3	0	0	3

- Date: November 26
- Location: Legion Field
  Birmingham, Alabama
- Game attendance: 46,000

As they entered their season finale against No. 8 Auburn, the Crimson Tide moved up one spot to the No. 17 position after their victory over Tampa. At Legion Field in the annual Iron Bowl game, Alabama shut out the Tigers for the second consecutive season, this time by a score of 3–0. The only points in this defensive struggle came in the second quarter on a 22-yard Tommy Brooker field goal.

=== Texas ===
Bluebonnet Bowl

Team	1	2	3	4	Total
Texas	0	0	0	3	3
#9 Alabama	0	0	3	0	3

- Date: December 17
- Location: Rice Stadium
  Houston, Texas
- Game attendance: 68,000

Immediately after their victory over Auburn in their season finale, Bryant accepted an invitation to play in the Bluebonnet Bowl against Texas. Against the Longhorns, each team only scored a single field goal in this 3–3 tie. Tommy Brooker connected on a 30-yard field goal for Alabama in the third and Dan Petty tied the game in the fourth for Texas with his 20-yard kick.

== Personnel ==
=== Varsity letter winners ===
Player	Hometown	Position
Ray Abruzzese	Philadelphia	Halfback
Jimmy Box	Sheffield, Alabama	End
Bill Battle	Birmingham, Alabama	End
Bobby Boylston	Atlanta	Tackle
Tommy Brooker	Demopolis, Alabama	End
James Cain	Pensacola, Florida	Tackle
Morris Childers	Birmingham, Alabama	Back
Elbert Cook	Jacksonville, Florida	Linebacker
Mike Fracchia	Memphis, Tennessee	Fullback
Leon Fuller	Nederland, Texas	Halfback
Donnie Heath	Anniston, Alabama	Center
Roy Holsomback	West Blocton, Alabama	Guard
Darwin Holt	Gainesville, Texas	Linebacker
Connell Johnson	High Point, North Carolina	Halfback
Lee Roy Jordan	Excel, Alabama	Linebacker
Bud Moore	Birmingham, Alabama	End
Elliott Moseley	Selma, Alabama	Center
Billy Neighbors	Northport, Alabama	Tackle
Richard O’Dell	Lincoln, Alabama	End
John O’Linger	Scottsboro, Alabama	Center
Bill Oliver	Livingston, Alabama	Defensive back
Charley Pell	Albertville, Alabama	Tackle
Bob Pettee	Bradenton, Florida	Guard
Gary Phillips	Dothan, Alabama	Guard
Billy Piper	Poplar Bluff, Missouri	Halfback
John Paul Poole	Florence, Alabama	End
William Rice	Troy, Alabama	Guard
Billy Richardson	Jasper, Alabama	Halfback
Norbie Ronsonet	Biloxi, Mississippi	End
Jack Rutledge	Birmingham, Alabama	Guard
Jimmy Sharpe	Montgomery, Alabama	Guard
Joseph Sisia	Clark, New Jersey	Tackle
Bobby Skelton	Pell City, Alabama	Quarterback
Jerry Spruiell	Pell City, Alabama	End
Laurien "Goobie" Stapp	Birmingham, Alabama	Quarterback/Placekicker
Pat Trammell	Scottsboro, Alabama	Quarterback
William "Buddy" Wesley	Talladega, Alabama	Fullback
Tommy White	West Blocton, Alabama	Fullback
Butch Wilson	Hueytown, Alabama	Halfback

=== Coaching staff ===
Name	Position	Seasons at Alabama	Alma mater
Bear Bryant	Head coach	3	Alabama (1936)
Sam Bailey	Assistant coach	3	Ouachita Baptist (1949)
Charlie Bradshaw	Assistant coach	2	Kentucky (1950)
Jerry Claiborne	Assistant coach	3	Kentucky (1950)
Don Cochran	Assistant coach	1	Alabama (1959)
Phil Cutchin	Assistant coach	3	Kentucky (1943)
Bob Ford	Assistant coach	2	Memphis State (1955)
Jim Goostree	Assistant coach	4	Tennessee (1952)
Clem Gryska	Assistant coach	1	Alabama (1948)
Dude Hennessey	Assistant coach	1	Kentucky (1955)
Pat James	Assistant coach	3	Kentucky (1951)
Elwood Kettler	Assistant coach	1	Texas A&M (1955)
Carney Laslie	Assistant coach	4	Alabama (1934)
Hayden Riley	Assistant coach	3	Alabama (1948)
Gene Stallings	Assistant coach	3	Texas A&M (1957)

== Freshmen squad ==
Prior to the 1972 NCAA University Division football season, NCAA rules prohibited freshmen from participating on the varsity team, and as such many schools fielded freshmen teams. For the 1960 season, the Alabama freshmen squad was coached by Sam Bailey and finished their season with a record of two wins and one loss (2–1). In their first game of the season, Alabama was shut out by Tulane at New Orleans, 19–0. Green Wave touchdowns were scored by Bill Hatchett on a one-yard run in the first and on a pair of fourth-quarter scores that were set up by Crimson Tide turnovers.

In their second game, the Crimson Tide defeated Mississippi State by a final score of 10–6 at Denny Stadium on a Monday. After a scoreless first quarter, State took a 6–0 lead in the second quarter on a 66-yard Wayne Gaines touchdown pass to Bobby Jones. Alabama responded later in the period with a 14-yard Hudson Harris touchdown run to take the lead and then added a 35-yard Tim Davis field goal in the third that made the final score 10–6. In the final freshmen game of the season, Alabama defeated Auburn 23–6 before 4,000 fans on a Monday at Denny Stadium. Alabama points were scored on a six-yard Dale Layton touchdown pass to Jerry Beard, a nine-yard Layton touchdown run, a 26-yard Larry Wall touchdown run and a 37-yard Tim Davis field goal. Auburn scored their only points in the fourth on a touchdown pass from Frank James to Reggie Allen, and in the loss, the Tigers fumbled the ball eight times with Alabama having recovered seven of them.

== NFL/AFL draft ==
Several players that were varsity lettermen from the 1960 squad were drafted into the National Football League (NFL) and the American Football League (AFL) in the 1962 and 1963 drafts. These players included the following:

Year	Round	Overall	Player name	Position	NFL/AFL team
1962 NFL draft	4	43	Billy Neighbors	Tackle	Washington Redskins
1962 NFL draft	5	69	Bill Rice	End	St. Louis Cardinals
1962 NFL draft	16	211	Tommy Brooker	End	Washington Redskins
1962 NFL draft	16	219	Ray Abruzzese	Running back	Baltimore Colts
1962 AFL draft	5	39	Bill Rice	End	Houston Oilers
1962 AFL draft	6	46	Billy Neighbors	Guard	Boston Patriots
1962 AFL draft	17	131	Tommy Brooker	End	Dallas Texans
1962 AFL draft	23	180	Ray Abruzzese	Safety	Buffalo Bills
1962 AFL draft	24	187	Pat Trammell	Quarterback	Dallas Texans
1963 NFL draft	1	6	Lee Roy Jordan	Linebacker	Dallas Cowboys
1963 NFL draft	2	24	Butch Wilson	Back	Baltimore Colts
1963 NFL draft	3	33	Mike Fracchia	Back	St. Louis Cardinals
1963 AFL draft	2	14	Lee Roy Jordan	Linebacker	Boston Patriots
1963 AFL draft	6	41	Butch Wilson	Tight end	Oakland Raiders
