= 1960 Gator Bowl (December) =

American college football game

Florida Gators	Baylor Bears
(8–2)	(8–2)
SEC	SWC
13	12
Head coach: Ray Graves	Head coach: John Bridgers
AP / Coaches; 18 / 16	AP / Coaches; 12 / 12
	1	2	3	4	Total
Florida	0	13	0	0	13
Baylor	0	0	0	12	12
- Date: December 31, 1960
- Season: 1960
- Stadium: Gator Bowl
- Location: Jacksonville, Florida
- MVP: Florida: Larry Libertore Baylor: Bobby Ply
- Referee: Burns McKinney (SWC; split crew: SWC, SEC)

The 1960 Gator Bowl was a post-season college football bowl game between the Florida Gators representing the Southeastern Conference (SEC) and the Baylor Bears of the Southwest Conference (SWC). Florida defeated Baylor 13–12. Both quarterbacks were the game's Most Valuable Player: Florida's Larry Libertore and Baylor's Bobby Ply.

== Game summary ==
Led by Vic Miranda, the Gator defense halted a 75-yard drive by Baylor on the half-yard line in the first quarter, setting the stage for two second quarter touchdowns. Baylor running back Ronnie Goodwin dropped the winning 2-point try in the closing seconds. Baylor quarterback Bobby Ply set a Gator Bowl record with 13 completions.

Scoring summary

Quarter	Time	Drive			Team	Scoring information	Score	
Quarter	Time	Plays	Yards	TOP	Team	Scoring information	FLA	BAY
2			20		FLA	Don Goodman 4-yard touchdown run, Cash kick good	7	0
2			0		FLA	Fumble recovery returned 0 yards for touchdown by Larry Travis, Cash kick no good	13	0
4			71		BAY	Ronnie Goodwin 11-yard touchdown reception from Bobby Ply, Corley kick No good	13	6
4			72		BAY	Ronnie Bull 4-yard touchdown run, 2-point Pass Incomplete	13	12
"TOP" = time of possession. For other American football terms, see Glossary of American football.							13	12
