= 1960 Gator Bowl =

The 1960 Gator Bowl may refer to:

- 1960 Gator Bowl (January), January 2, 1960, game between the Arkansas Razorbacks and the Georgia Tech Yellow Jackets
- 1960 Gator Bowl (December), December 31, 1960, game between the Florida Gators and the Baylor Bears
