= 1960 Ole Miss Rebels football team =

American college football season

1960 Ole Miss Rebels football

FWAA national champion SEC champion Sugar Bowl champion

Sugar Bowl, W 14–6 vs. Rice
- Conference: Southeastern Conference

Ranking
- Coaches: No. 3
- AP: No. 2
- Record: 10–0–1 (5–0–1 SEC)
- Head coach: Johnny Vaught (14th season)
- Home stadium: Hemingway Stadium; Crump Stadium

1960 Southeastern Conference football standings
	Conf.					Overall
Team	W		L		T	W		L		T
No. 2 Ole Miss $	5	–	0	–	1	10	–	0	–	1
No. 18 Florida	5	–	1	–	0	9	–	2	–	0
No. 9 Alabama	5	–	1	–	1	8	–	1	–	2
No. 13 Auburn	5	–	2	–	0	8	–	2	–	0
Tennessee	3	–	2	–	2	6	–	2	–	2
Georgia	4	–	3	–	0	6	–	4	–	0
Georgia Tech	4	–	4	–	0	5	–	5	–	0
LSU	2	–	3	–	1	5	–	4	–	1
Kentucky	2	–	4	–	1	5	–	4	–	1
Tulane	1	–	4	–	1	3	–	6	–	1
Mississippi State	0	–	5	–	1	2	–	6	–	1
Vanderbilt	0	–	7	–	0	3	–	7	–	0
$ – Conference champion; Rankings from AP Poll

The 1960 Ole Miss Rebels football team represented the University of Mississippi during the 1960 college football season. In their fourteenth season under head coach Johnny Vaught, the Rebels compiled a 10–0–1 record and won their fourth Southeastern Conference (SEC) championship. Their only blemish was a 6–6 tie against LSU. Mississippi was the only major-conference team in the nation that finished the season undefeated on the field (Missouri subsequently was credited with an undefeated season when its lone loss to Kansas was erased by forfeit).

The final Associated Press (AP) and United Press International (UPI) polls placed the Rebels second and third, respectively, behind the Minnesota Golden Gophers who were voted national champions before the bowl games. The AP first named a post-bowl champion in 1965 and made the change permanent in 1968; the UPI continued to name its national champion prior to bowl games through 1973.

The final AP poll of November 29 was one of the closest ever: Minnesota with 17½ first-place votes, Mississippi 16, and Iowa 12½. Students made "AP" and "UPI" dummies, hung them from the Union Building, and burned them while chanting, "We're No. 1, to hell with AP and UPI." The No. 1 Gophers, however, subsequently lost the Rose Bowl to No. 6 Washington. Meanwhile, No. 2 Ole Miss defeated Rice, 14–6, in the Sugar Bowl. Quarterback Jake Gibbs was voted the game's MVP by scoring two rushing touchdowns.

After the New Year's Day bowl games, the Football Writers Association of America (FWAA) voted Mississippi as national champions and awarded them the Grantland Rice Trophy.

== Schedule ==
In the Egg Bowl, Ole Miss beat Mississippi State, 35–9. Ole Miss held the lead in the series with 29 wins, 24 losses and 4 ties. In the Magnolia Bowl, Ole Miss tied LSU, 6–6. LSU held the lead in the series with 27 wins, 20 losses, and 2 ties. This season marked the last time LSU played in Oxford until 1989.

Date	Opponent	Rank	Site	Result	Attendance	Source
September 17	at Houston*	No. 2	Rice Stadium; Houston, TX	W 42–0	45,000	
September 24	Kentucky	No. 1	Crump Stadium; Memphis, TN	W 21–6	30,187	
October 1	at Memphis State*	No. 1	Crump Stadium; Memphis, TN (rivalry)	W 31–20	24,711–34,711	
October 8	at Vanderbilt	No. 2	Dudley Field; Nashville, TN (rivalry)	W 26-0	23,000	
October 15	at Tulane	No. 1	Tulane Stadium; New Orleans, LA (rivalry)	W 26–13	73,000	
October 22	at No. 14 Arkansas*	No. 2	War Memorial Stadium; Little Rock, AR (rivalry)	W 10–7	40,000	
October 29	LSU	No. 2	Hemingway Stadium; Oxford, MS (rivalry)	T 6–6	34,000	
November 5	Chattanooga*	No. 6	Hemingway Stadium; Oxford, MS	W 45–0	13,500–14,000	
November 12	at No. 14 Tennessee	No. 4	Shields–Watkins Field; Knoxville, TN (rivalry)	W 24–3	45,100	
November 26	Mississippi State	No. 3	Hemingway Stadium; Oxford, MS (Egg Bowl)	W 35–9	34,000	
January 2, 1961	vs. Rice*	No. 2	Tulane Stadium; New Orleans, LA (Sugar Bowl)	W 14–6	82,851	
*Non-conference game; Rankings from AP Poll released prior to the game; Source:

== Personnel ==
1960 Ole Miss Rebels football team roster
Players
Coaches
Offense

Pos.	#	Name	Class
E		Johnny Lee Brewer
QB		Jake Gibbs

Defense

Pos.	#	Name	Class

Special teams

Pos.	#	Name	Class

Head coach

- Johnny Vaught

Coordinators/assistant coaches

Legend

- (C) Team captain
- (S) Suspended
- (I) Ineligible
- Injured
- Redshirt

== 1961 NFL draft ==
Player	Round	Pick	Position	Club
Bobby Crespino	1	10	Halfback	Cleveland Browns
Jerry Daniels	5	67	Tackle	New York Giants
Allen Green	8	109	Center	New York Giants
Jake Gibbs	9	125	Quarterback	Cleveland Browns
Bob Benton	11	151	Tackle	New York Giants
Doug Elmore	13	171	Back	Washington Redskins
Charley Taylor	15	209	Back	Cleveland Browns

== Awards and honors ==
- Jake Gibbs, Sugar Bowl Most Valuable Player
- Johnny Vaught, SEC Coach of the Year
