= Vic Miranda =

American football player

Profile
- Position: Guard

Personal information
- Born: Miami, Florida, U.S.
- Listed height: 6 ft 0 in (1.83 m)
- Listed weight: 198 lb (90 kg)

Career information
- High school: North Miami
- College: Florida (1957–1960)

Awards and highlights
- First-team All-SEC (1960); Fergie Ferguson Award (1960); University of Florida Athletic Hall of Fame

Victor Russell Miranda was an American college football player and insurance executive. He was a two-way lineman for coaches Bob Woodruff and Ray Graves' Florida Gators football teams. A native of Miami, Miranda faced assault charges as a freshman. Miranda was selected All-SEC and AP Honorable Mention All-America in 1960, a year in which his defense helped spark the Gators to a defeat of Baylor in the Gator Bowl. The Gators halted a 75-yard drive by Baylor on the half-yard line in the first quarter, setting the stage for two second quarter touchdowns. Larry Libertore was the game's MVP. Miranda also won the school's coveted Fergie Ferguson Award. He was inducted into the University of Florida Athletics Hall of Fame as a "Gator Great." Miranda was also a prominent booster for the Gators program, once president of boosters.

== See also ==
- List of University of Florida Athletic Hall of Fame members
