= King Block (American football) =

American football player and coach (1929–2014)

Biographical details
- Born: April 11, 1929; Superior, Nebraska, U.S.
- Died: October 6, 2014 (aged 85); Ozark, Missouri, U.S.

Playing career
- 1948–1950: Idaho
- Position: Fullback

Coaching career (HC unless noted)
- 1955–1959: Arkansas State (backs)
- 1960–1962: Arkansas State
- 1963: Nebraska (DL)
- 1964–1967: Washington State (assistant)
- 1968–1972: Iowa State (assistant)

Head coaching record
- Overall: 13–14

Milbourne King Block Sr. (April 11, 1929 – October 6, 2014) was an American college football player and coach. He was the head coach at Arkansas State College (now ASU) from 1960 to 1962 and amassed a 13–14 record.

== Early years ==
Born in Superior, Nebraska, Block earned 12 athletic letters at Twin Falls High School in south central Idaho, and graduated in 1947. He played college football at the University of Idaho in Moscow, where he was a fullback under head coach Dixie Howell. Block played on the varsity from 1948 to 1950, and was named to the All-Coast football team. He was selected 250th overall in the 21st round of the 1951 NFL draft by the Detroit Lions. At Idaho, he was a member of Sigma Alpha Epsilon fraternity, and graduated with a degree in education.

== Coaching career ==
After a coaching stint at Grangeville High School in north central Idaho, Block joined the Arkansas State coaching staff as the backfield assistant in 1955, under head coach Gene Harlow, who had been the guards coach at Idaho while Block was in college. Block was promoted to head coach in February 1960 and compiled a 13–14 record in three seasons. His offense was described as primarily reliant upon "the running of the fullback and quarterback."

He resigned after the 1962 season to become the defensive line coach at Nebraska under head coach Bob Devaney. Arkansas State replaced Block with defensive backs coach Bennie Ellender. After one season in Lincoln, Block joined the staff of new head coach Bert Clark at Washington State in 1964 and remained in Pullman through 1967. He later served as an assistant at Iowa State until 1972. Aside from coaching football, Block also competed in rodeo events and bred quarterhorses, which he later parlayed into "King Blocks Korral," one of the largest western stores in Iowa.

== Death ==
After a lengthy illness, Block died in 2014 at age 85 in Ozark, Missouri; his remains were cremated.

== Head coaching record ==
| Year | Team | Overall | Conference | Standing | Bowl/playoffs |
|---|---|---|---|---|---|
Arkansas State Indians (NCAA College Division independent) (1960–1962)
| 1960 | Arkansas State | 4–5 | | | |
| 1961 | Arkansas State | 3–6 | | | |
| 1962 | Arkansas State | 6–3 | | | |
| Arkansas State: | | 13–14 | | | |
| Total: | | 13–14 | | | |
