= 1960 McNeese State Cowboys football team =

American college football season

1960 McNeese State Cowboys football
- Conference: Gulf States Conference
- Record: 7–3 (3–2 GSC)
- Head coach: Les DeVall (4th season)
- Home stadium: Wildcat Stadium

1960 Gulf States Conference football standings
	Conf.					Overall
Team	W		L		T	W		L		T
No. 5 Southeastern Louisiana +	4	–	1	–	0	9	–	1	–	0
No. 12 Louisiana Tech +	4	–	1	–	0	8	–	2	–	0
McNeese State	3	–	2	–	0	7	–	3	–	0
Southwestern Louisiana	3	–	2	–	0	6	–	4	–	0
Northeast Louisiana State	1	–	4	–	0	3	–	7	–	0
Northwestern State	0	–	5	–	0	3	–	6	–	0
+ – Conference co-champions; Rankings from NAIA poll

The 1960 McNeese State Cowboys football team was an American football team that represented McNeese State College (now known as McNeese State University) as a member of the Gulf States Conference (GSC) during the 1960 college football season. In their fourth year under head coach Les DeVall, the team compiled an overall record of 7–3 with a mark of 3–2 in conference play, tying for third place in the GSC.

== Schedule ==
Date	Opponent	Site	Result	Attendance	Source
September 17	at Pensacola NAS*	NAS Stadium; Penscaola, FL	L 7–13	5,000	
September 24	Stephen F. Austin*	Wildcat Stadium; Lake Charles, LA	W 14–0	4,500	
October 1	at Louisiana Tech	Tech Stadium; Ruston, LA	L 14–15	7,500	
October 8	at Arlington State*	Memorial Stadium; Arlington, TX	W 7–0	5,000–5,600	
October 15	Northeast Louisiana State	Wildcat Stadium; Lake Charles, LA	W 14–8	5,000–5,800	
October 22	at Tampa*	Phillips Field; Tampa, FL	W 3–0	3,500–4,500	
October 30	Louisiana College*	Wildcat Stadium; Lake Charles, LA	W 20–7	6,000	
November 5	Northwestern State	Wildcat Stadium; Lake Charles, LA (rivalry)	W 20–7	6,000	
November 12	at Southeastern Louisiana	Strawberry Stadium; Hammond, LA	L 6–21	5,500	
November 19	Southwestern Louisiana	Wildcat Stadium; Lake Charles, LA (rivalry)	W 28–18	6,200	
*Non-conference game
