= 1960 Mississippi State Maroons football team =

American college football season

1960 Mississippi State Maroons football
- Conference: Southeastern Conference
- Record: 2–6–1 (0–5–1 SEC)
- Head coach: Wade Walker (5th season)
- Home stadium: Scott Field

1960 Southeastern Conference football standings
| | Conf. | | | | | Overall |
| Team | W | | L | | T | W | | L | | T |
|---|---|---|---|---|---|---|---|---|---|---|
| No. 2 Ole Miss $ | 5 | – | 0 | – | 1 | 10 | – | 0 | – | 1 |
| No. 18 Florida | 5 | – | 1 | – | 0 | 9 | – | 2 | – | 0 |
| No. 9 Alabama | 5 | – | 1 | – | 1 | 8 | – | 1 | – | 2 |
| No. 13 Auburn | 5 | – | 2 | – | 0 | 8 | – | 2 | – | 0 |
| Tennessee | 3 | – | 2 | – | 2 | 6 | – | 2 | – | 2 |
| Georgia | 4 | – | 3 | – | 0 | 6 | – | 4 | – | 0 |
| Georgia Tech | 4 | – | 4 | – | 0 | 5 | – | 5 | – | 0 |
| LSU | 2 | – | 3 | – | 1 | 5 | – | 4 | – | 1 |
| Kentucky | 2 | – | 4 | – | 1 | 5 | – | 4 | – | 1 |
| Tulane | 1 | – | 4 | – | 1 | 3 | – | 6 | – | 1 |
| Mississippi State | 0 | – | 5 | – | 1 | 2 | – | 6 | – | 1 |
| Vanderbilt | 0 | – | 7 | – | 0 | 3 | – | 7 | – | 0 |
$ – Conference champion; Rankings from AP Poll

The 1960 Mississippi State Maroons football team was an American football team that represented Mississippi State University as a member of the Southeastern Conference (SEC) during the 1960 college football season. In their fifth year under head coach Wade Walker, the team compiled an overall record of 2–6–1, with a mark of 0–5–1 in conference play, and finished 11th in the SEC.

== Schedule ==
| Date | Opponent | Site | Result | Attendance | Source |
|---|---|---|---|---|---|
| September 24 | Houston* | Scott Field; Starkville, MS | L 10–14 | 14,000 | |
| October 1 | vs. No. 11 Tennessee | Crump Stadium; Memphis, TN | T 0–0 | 27,000 | |
| October 8 | Arkansas State* | Scott Field; Starkville, MS | W 29–9 | 10,000 | |
| October 15 | at Georgia | Sanford Stadium; Athens, GA | L 17–20 | 36,000 | |
| October 22 | Memphis State* | Scott Field; Starkville, MS | W 21–0 | 27,000 | |
| October 29 | Alabama^{†} | Scott Field; Starkville, MS (rivalry) | L 0–7 | 25,000 | |
| November 5 | at No. 12 Auburn | Cliff Hare Stadium; Auburn, AL | L 12–27 | 38,000 | |
| November 12 | at LSU | Tiger Stadium; Baton Rouge, LA (rivalry) | L 3–7 | 45,000 | |
| November 26 | at No. 3 Ole Miss | Hemingway Stadium; Oxford, MS (Egg Bowl) | L 9–35 | 34,000 | |
*Non-conference game; ^{†}Homecoming; Rankings from AP Poll released prior to the game
