= 1960 TCU Horned Frogs football team =

American college football season

1960 TCU Horned Frogs football
- Conference: Southwest Conference
- Record: 4–4–2 (3–3–1 SWC)
- Head coach: Abe Martin (8th season)
- Offensive scheme: Meyer spread
- Home stadium: Amon G. Carter Stadium

1960 Southwest Conference football standings
	Conf.					Overall
Team	W		L		T	W		L		T
No. 7 Arkansas $	6	–	1	–	0	8	–	3	–	0
No. 12 Baylor	5	–	2	–	0	8	–	3	–	0
Texas	5	–	2	–	0	7	–	3	–	1
Rice	5	–	2	–	0	7	–	4	–	0
TCU	3	–	3	–	1	4	–	4	–	2
Texas Tech	1	–	5	–	1	3	–	6	–	1
Texas A&M	0	–	4	–	3	1	–	6	–	3
SMU	0	–	6	–	1	0	–	9	–	1
$ – Conference champion; Rankings from AP Poll

The 1960 TCU Horned Frogs football team represented Texas Christian University (TCU) in the 1960 college football season. The Horned Frogs finished the season 4–4–2 overall and 3–3–1 in the Southwest Conference. The team was coached by Abe Martin in his eighth year as head coach. The Frogs played their home games in Amon G. Carter Stadium, which is located on campus in Fort Worth, Texas.

== Schedule ==
Date	Opponent	Rank	Site	Result	Attendance	Source
September 17	at Kansas*	No. 11	Memorial Stadium; Lawrence, KS	L 7–21	32,000	
September 24	at USC*		Los Angeles Memorial Coliseum; Los Angeles, CA	W 7–6	31,475	
October 1	No. 14 Arkansas		Amon G. Carter Stadium; Fort Worth, TX	L 0–7	38,000	
October 8	Texas Tech		Amon G. Carter Stadium; Fort Worth, TX (rivalry)	W 21–7	25,000	
October 15	Texas A&M		Kyle Field; College Station, TX (rivalry)	T 14–14	16,000	
October 22	Pittsburgh*		Amon G. Carter Stadium; Fort Worth, TX	T 7–7	25,000	
October 29	No. 7 Baylor		Amon G. Carter Stadium; Fort Worth, TX (rivalry)	W 14–6	35,000	
November 12	Texas		Amon G. Carter Stadium; Fort Worth, TX (rivalry)	L 2–3	40,000	
November 19	at No. 14 Rice		Rice Stadium; Houston, TX	L 0–23	35,000	
November 26	at SMU		Cotton Bowl; Dallas, TX (rivalry)	W 13–0	20,000	
*Non-conference game; Rankings from AP Poll released prior to the game

== Roster ==
1960 TCU Horned Frogs football team roster
Players			Coaches
Offense: Pos. / # / Name / Class	Defense: Pos. / # / Name / Class; DT / 72 / Bob Lilly	Special teams: Pos. / # / Name / Class	Head coach: Abe Martin; Coordinators/assistant coaches Legend: (C) Team captain; (S) Suspended; (I) Ineligible; Injured; Redshirt
