= 1960 California Golden Bears football team =

American college football season

1960 California Golden Bears football
- Conference: Athletic Association of Western Universities
- Record: 2–7–1 (1–3 AAWU)
- Head coach: Marv Levy (1st season)
- Home stadium: California Memorial Stadium

1960 Athletic Association of Western Universities football standings
	Conf.					Overall
Team	W		L		T	W		L		T
No. 6 Washington $	4	–	0	–	0	10	–	1	–	0
USC	3	–	1	–	0	4	–	6	–	0
UCLA	2	–	2	–	0	7	–	2	–	1
California	1	–	3	–	0	2	–	7	–	1
Stanford	0	–	4	–	0	0	–	10	–	0
$ – Conference champion; Rankings from AP poll

The 1960 California Golden Bears football team was an American football team that represented the University of California, Berkeley in the Athletic Association of Western Universities (AAWU) during the 1960 college football season. In its first year under head coach Marv Levy, the team compiled a 2–7–1 record (1–3 against AAWU opponents), finished in fourth place in the AAWU, and was outscored by its opponents by a combined total of 195 to 93.

The team's statistical leaders included Randy Gold with 696 passing yards, Steve Bates with 384 rushing yards, and Dave George with 128 receiving yards. Cal center Dick Carlson received recognition from the Associated Press (AP) as a second-team player on the 1960 All-Pacific Coast football team.

== Schedule ==
Date	Opponent	Site	Result	Attendance	Source
September 17	Tulane*	California Memorial Stadium; Berkeley, CA	L 3–7	37,500	
September 24	at Notre Dame*	Notre Dame Stadium; Notre Dame, IN	L 7–21	49,286	
October 1	Army*	California Memorial Stadium; Berkeley, CA	L 10–28	51,000	
October 8	Washington State*	California Memorial Stadium; Berkeley, CA	T 21–21	31,000	
October 15	at USC	Los Angeles Memorial Coliseum; Los Angeles, CA	L 10–27	39,830	
October 22	Oregon*	California Memorial Stadium; Berkeley, CA	L 0–20	36,000	
October 29	at No. 15 Oregon State*	Parker Stadium; Corvallis, OR	W 14–6	14,835	
November 5	No. 15 UCLA	California Memorial Stadium; Berkeley, CA (rivalry)	L 0–28	31,000	
November 12	at No. 6 Washington	Husky Stadium; Seattle, WA	L 7–27	55,884	
November 19	Stanford	California Memorial Stadium; Berkeley, CA (Big Game)	W 21–10	76,200	
*Non-conference game; Rankings from AP Poll released prior to the game; Source:
