= 1960 Northeast Louisiana State Indians football team =

American college football season

1960 Northeast Louisiana State Indians football
- Conference: Gulf States Conference
- Record: 3–7 (1–4 GSC)
- Head coach: Jack C. Rowan (3rd season)
- Home stadium: Brown Stadium

1960 Gulf States Conference football standings
	Conf.					Overall
Team	W		L		T	W		L		T
No. 5 Southeastern Louisiana +	4	–	1	–	0	9	–	1	–	0
No. 12 Louisiana Tech +	4	–	1	–	0	8	–	2	–	0
McNeese State	3	–	2	–	0	7	–	3	–	0
Southwestern Louisiana	3	–	2	–	0	6	–	4	–	0
Northeast Louisiana State	1	–	4	–	0	3	–	7	–	0
Northwestern State	0	–	5	–	0	3	–	6	–	0
+ – Conference co-champions; Rankings from NAIA poll

The 1960 Northeast Louisiana State Indians football team was an American football team that represented Northeast Louisiana State College (now known as the University of Louisiana at Monroe) in the Gulf States Conference during the 1960 college football season. In their third year under head coach Jack C. Rowan, the team compiled a 3–7 record.

== Schedule ==
Date	Opponent	Site	Result	Attendance	Source
September 17	Arkansas State*	Brown Stadium; Monroe, LA	W 13–6	5,000–6,500	
September 24	at Arlington State*	Memorial Stadium; Arlington, TX	L 0–16	5,000–5,500	
October 1	at East Texas State*	Memorial Stadium; Commerce, TX	L 6–13	5,000	
October 8	Northwestern State	Brown Stadium; Monroe, LA (rivalry)	W 7–6	5,000	
October 15	at McNeese State	Wildcat Stadium; Lake Charles, LA	L 8–14	5,000–5,800	
October 22	at Southeastern Louisiana	Strawberry Stadium; Hammond, LA	L 0–26	3,500	
October 29	at Southwestern Louisiana	McNaspy Stadium; Lafayette, LA (rivalry)	L 7–8	5,000–7,200	
November 5	at Delta State*	Delta Field; Cleveland, MS	L 0–27	3,000	
November 12	Jacksonville State*	Brown Stadium; Monroe, LA	W 35–0	5,000	
November 19	Louisiana Tech	Brown Stadium; Monroe, LA (rivalry)	L 15–20	6,000	
*Non-conference game
