= 1960 Texas Longhorns football team =

American college football season

1960 Texas Longhorns football

Bluebonnet Bowl, T 3–3 vs. Alabama
- Conference: Southwest Conference

Ranking
- Coaches: No. 17
- Record: 7–3–1 (5–2 SWC)
- Head coach: Darrell Royal (4th season)
- Home stadium: Memorial Stadium

1960 Southwest Conference football standings
	Conf.					Overall
Team	W		L		T	W		L		T
No. 7 Arkansas $	6	–	1	–	0	8	–	3	–	0
No. 12 Baylor	5	–	2	–	0	8	–	3	–	0
Texas	5	–	2	–	0	7	–	3	–	1
Rice	5	–	2	–	0	7	–	4	–	0
TCU	3	–	3	–	1	4	–	4	–	2
Texas Tech	1	–	5	–	1	3	–	6	–	1
Texas A&M	0	–	4	–	3	1	–	6	–	3
SMU	0	–	6	–	1	0	–	9	–	1
$ – Conference champion; Rankings from AP Poll

The 1960 Texas Longhorns football team was an American football team that represented the University of Texas (now known as the University of Texas at Austin) as a member of the Southwest Conference (SWC) during the 1960 college football season. In their fourth year under head coach Darrell Royal, the Longhorns compiled an overall record of 7–3–1, with a mark of 5–2 in conference play, and finished tied for third in the SWC. Texas concluded their season with a tie against Alabama in the Bluebonnet Bowl.

== Schedule ==
Date	Time	Opponent	Rank	Site	TV	Result	Attendance	Source
September 17	7:30 p.m.	Nebraska*	No. 4	Memorial Stadium; Austin, TX		L 13–14	40,000	
September 24	12:00 p.m.	at Maryland*	No. 15	Byrd Stadium; College Park, MD		W 34–0	31,000	
October 1	7:30 p.m.	Texas Tech	No. 13	Memorial Stadium; Austin, TX (rivalry)		W 17–0	52,000	
October 8	2:00 p.m.	vs. Oklahoma*	No. 15	Cotton Bowl; Dallas, TX (rivalry)		W 24–0	75,504	
October 15	1:30 p.m.	Arkansas	No. 11	Memorial Stadium; Austin, TX (rivalry)	ABC	L 23–24	35,000	
October 22	8:00 p.m.	at No. 20 Rice	No. 16	Rice Stadium; Houston, TX (rivalry)		L 0–7	72,000	
October 29	2:00 p.m.	SMU		Memorial Stadium; Austin, TX		W 17–7	34,000	
November 5	2:00 p.m.	at No. 11 Baylor		Baylor Stadium; Waco, TX (rivalry)		W 12–7	50,000	
November 12	2:00 p.m.	at TCU		Amon G. Carter Stadium; Fort Worth, TX (rivalry)		W 3–2	40,000	
November 24	1:30 p.m.	Texas A&M		Memorial Stadium; Austin, TX (rivalry)	ABC	W 21–14	53,000	
December 17	1:00 p.m.	vs. No. 9 Alabama*		Rice Stadium; Houston, TX (Bluebonnet Bowl)		T 3–3	68,000	
*Non-conference game; Rankings from AP Poll released prior to the game; All times are in Central time
