= 1960 Arkansas State Indians football team =

American college football season

1960 Arkansas State Indians football
- Conference: Independent
- Record: 4–5
- Head coach: King Block (1st season)
- Home stadium: Kays Stadium

1960 Southern non-major college football independents records
	Conf.			Overall
Team	W	L	T	W		L		T
Washington and Lee		–		8	–	0	–	1
Arlington State		–		9	–	2	–	0
Howard (AL)		–		8	–	1	–	0
Louisville		–		7	–	2	–	0
Mississippi Southern		–		6	–	4	–	0
Sewanee		–		4	–	3	–	1
Abilene Christian		–		5	–	5	–	0
Chattanooga		–		5	–	5	–	0
Arkansas State		–		4	–	5	–	0
Tampa		–		2	–	7	–	1
Trinity (TX)		–		2	–	7	–	1

The 1960 Arkansas State Indians football team represented Arkansas State College—now known as Arkansas State University—as an independent during the 1960 college football season. Led by first-year head coach King Block, the Indians compiled a record of 4–5.

== Schedule ==
Date	Opponent	Site	Result	Attendance	Source
September 17	at Northeast Louisiana State	Brown Stadium; Monroe, LA	L 6–13	5,000–6,500	
September 24	Louisiana Tech	Kays Stadium; Jonesboro, AR	W 7–3	5,000–6,500	
October 1	at Florence State	Municipal Stadium; Florence, AL	W 19–0	6,000	
October 8	at Mississippi State	Scott Field; Starkville, MS	L 9–29	10,000	
October 22	at Montana State	Gatton Field; Bozeman, MT	L 6–26	5,000–8,000	
October 29	at Murray State	Cutchin Stadium; Murray, KY	W 27–14	5,000–6,000	
November 5	Mississippi Southern	Kays Stadium; Jonesboro, AR	W 14–13	6,500–7,000	
November 12	Tennessee Tech	Kays Stadium; Jonesboro, AR	L 6–17	5,000	
November 19	The Citadel	Kays Stadium; Jonesboro, AR	L 21–22	5,000	
