= 1960 Texas Tech Red Raiders football team =

American college football season

1960 Texas Tech Red Raiders football
- Conference: Southwest Conference
- Record: 3–6–1 (1–5–1 SWC)
- Head coach: DeWitt Weaver (10th season)
- Offensive scheme: T formation
- Base defense: 5–3
- Home stadium: Jones Stadium

1960 Southwest Conference football standings
	Conf.					Overall
Team	W		L		T	W		L		T
No. 7 Arkansas $	6	–	1	–	0	8	–	3	–	0
No. 12 Baylor	5	–	2	–	0	8	–	3	–	0
Texas	5	–	2	–	0	7	–	3	–	1
Rice	5	–	2	–	0	7	–	4	–	0
TCU	3	–	3	–	1	4	–	4	–	2
Texas Tech	1	–	5	–	1	3	–	6	–	1
Texas A&M	0	–	4	–	3	1	–	6	–	3
SMU	0	–	6	–	1	0	–	9	–	1
$ – Conference champion; Rankings from AP Poll

The 1960 Texas Tech Red Raiders football team represented Texas Technological College—now known as Texas Tech University—as a member of the Southwest Conference (SWC) during the 1960 college football season. In their tenth and final season under head coach DeWitt Weaver, the Red Raiders compiled a 3–6–1 record (1–5–1 against conference opponents), finished in sixth place in the SWC, and were outscored by opponents by a combined total of 182 to 148. The team's statistical leaders included Glenn Amerson with 464 passing yards, Coolidge Hunt with 527 rushing yards, and Bake Turner with 173 receiving yards. The team played its home games at Clifford B. and Audrey Jones Stadium.

== Schedule ==
Date	Opponent	Site	Result	Attendance	Source
September 17	West Texas State*	Jones Stadium; Lubbock, TX	W 38–14	30,000	
September 24	at Texas A&M	Kyle Field; College Station, TX (rivalry)	T 14–14	13,000	
October 1	at No. 13 Texas	Memorial Stadium; Austin, TX (rivalry)	L 0–17	52,000	
October 8	at TCU	Amon G. Carter Stadium; Fort Worth, TX (rivalry)	L 7–21	25,000	
October 15	No. 7 Baylor	Jones Stadium; Lubbock, TX (rivalry)	L 7–14	29,000	
October 22	SMU^{†}	Jones Stadium; Lubbock, TX	W 28–7	32,000	
October 29	at No. 13 Rice	Rice Stadium; Houston, TX	L 6–30	26,000	
November 5	Tulane*	Jones Stadium; Lubbock, TX	W 35–21	15,000	
November 12	Wyoming*	Jones Stadium; Lubbock, TX	L 7–10	20,000	
November 19	No. 7 Arkansas	Jones Stadium; Lubbock, TX (rivalry)	L 6–34	30,000	
*Non-conference game; ^{†}Homecoming; Rankings from AP Poll released prior to the game
