= 1960 Arlington State Rebels football team =

American college football season

1960 Arlington State Rebels football
- Conference: Independent
- Record: 9–2
- Head coach: Chena Gilstrap (8th season)
- Home stadium: Memorial Stadium

1960 Southern non-major college football independents records
	Conf.			Overall
Team	W	L	T	W		L		T
Washington and Lee		–		8	–	0	–	1
Arlington State		–		9	–	2	–	0
Howard (AL)		–		8	–	1	–	0
Louisville		–		7	–	2	–	0
Mississippi Southern		–		6	–	4	–	0
Sewanee		–		4	–	3	–	1
Abilene Christian		–		5	–	5	–	0
Chattanooga		–		5	–	5	–	0
Arkansas State		–		4	–	5	–	0
Tampa		–		2	–	7	–	1
Trinity (TX)		–		2	–	7	–	1

The 1960 Arlington State Rebels football team was an American football team that represented Arlington State College (now known as the University of Texas at Arlington) as an independent during the 1960 college football season. In their eighth year under head coach Chena Gilstrap, the team compiled a 9–2 record.

== Schedule ==
Date	Opponent	Site	Result	Attendance	Source
September 10	at Stephen F. Austin	Panther Stadium; Lufkin, TX	W 14–7	3,500	
September 17	at Memphis State	Crump Stadium; Memphis, TN	L 0–35	9,703–12,000	
September 24	Northeast Louisiana State	Memorial Stadium; Arlington, TX	W 16–0	5,000–5,500	
October 1	at Delta State	Delta Field; Cleveland, MS	W 19–8	3,000	
October 8	McNeese State	Memorial Stadium; Arlington, TX	L 0–7	5,000–5,600	
October 15	at Southwestern Louisiana	McNaspy Stadium; Lafayette, LA	W 13–7	6,000–10,000	
October 22	Abilene Christian	Memorial Stadium; Arlington, TX	W 29–6	5,800	
October 29	Trinity (TX)	Memorial Stadium; Arlington, TX	W 22–13	5,500	
November 5	McMurry	Memorial Stadium; Arlington, TX	W 31–13	5,700	
November 12	Corpus Christi	Memorial Stadium; Arlington, TX	W 34–0	4,500–4,700	
November 19	at Southwestern Oklahoma State	Milam Stadium; Weatherford, OK	W 13–0	1,000	
