= 1960 Kentucky Wildcats football team =

American college football season

1960 Kentucky Wildcats football
- Conference: Southeastern Conference
- Record: 5–4–1 (2–4–1 SEC)
- Head coach: Blanton Collier (7th season)
- Home stadium: McLean Stadium

1960 Southeastern Conference football standings
	Conf.					Overall
Team	W		L		T	W		L		T
No. 2 Ole Miss $	5	–	0	–	1	10	–	0	–	1
No. 18 Florida	5	–	1	–	0	9	–	2	–	0
No. 9 Alabama	5	–	1	–	1	8	–	1	–	2
No. 13 Auburn	5	–	2	–	0	8	–	2	–	0
Tennessee	3	–	2	–	2	6	–	2	–	2
Georgia	4	–	3	–	0	6	–	4	–	0
Georgia Tech	4	–	4	–	0	5	–	5	–	0
LSU	2	–	3	–	1	5	–	4	–	1
Kentucky	2	–	4	–	1	5	–	4	–	1
Tulane	1	–	4	–	1	3	–	6	–	1
Mississippi State	0	–	5	–	1	2	–	6	–	1
Vanderbilt	0	–	7	–	0	3	–	7	–	0
$ – Conference champion; Rankings from AP Poll

The 1960 Kentucky Wildcats football team were an American football team that represented the University of Kentucky as a member of the Southeastern Conference during the 1960 college football season. In their seventh season under head coach Blanton Collier, the team compiled a 5–4–1 record (2–4–1 in the SEC).

== Schedule ==
Date	Opponent	Site	Result	Attendance	Source
September 17	at Georgia Tech	Grant Field; Atlanta, GA	L 13–23	40,594	
September 24	at No. 1 Ole Miss	Crump Stadium; Memphis, TN	L 6–21	30,187	
October 1	Auburn	McLean Stadium; Lexington, KY	L 7–10	33,000	
October 8	Marshall*	McLean Stadium; Lexington, KY	W 55–0	15,000	
October 15	LSU	McLean Stadium; Lexington, KY	W 3–0	28,000	
October 22	Georgia	McLean Stadium; Lexington, KY	L 13–17	31,000	
October 29	at Florida State*	Doak Campbell Stadium; Tallahassee, FL	W 23–0	19,200	
November 5	Vanderbilt	McLean Stadium; Lexington, KY (rivalry)	W 27–0	28,000	
November 12	Xavier*	McLean Stadium; Lexington, KY	W 49–0	20,000–21,000	
November 19	at Tennessee	Shields–Watkins Field; Knoxville, TN (rivalry)	T 10–10	39,800	
*Non-conference game; Rankings from Coaches' Poll released prior to the game
