= 1961 Sugar Bowl =

American college football game

- 27th Sugar Bowl
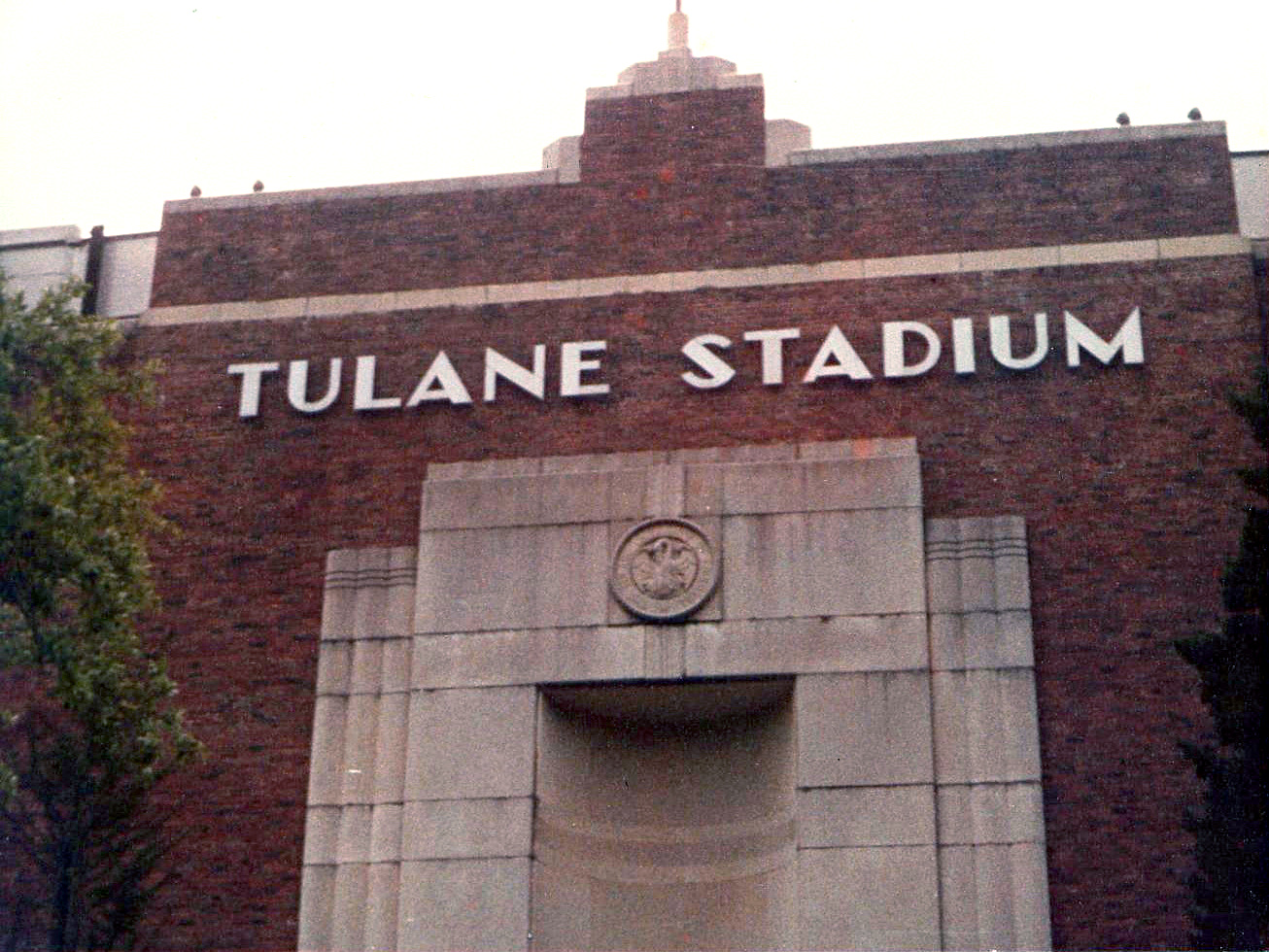
- Tulane Stadium in New Orleans, Louisiana, hosted the Sugar Bowl.
Ole Miss Rebels	Rice Owls
(9–0–1)	(7–3)
SEC	SWC
14	6
Head coach: Johnny Vaught	Head coach: Jess Neely
AP / Coaches; 2 / 3
	1	2	3	4	Total
Ole Miss	7	0	0	7	14
Rice	0	0	6	0	6
- Date: January 2, 1961
- Season: 1960
- Stadium: Tulane Stadium
- Location: New Orleans, Louisiana
- Referee: E.D. Cavette (SEC; split crew: SEC, SWC)
- Attendance: 82,851

United States TV coverage
- Network: NBC

The 1961 Sugar Bowl featured the second-ranked Ole Miss Rebels and the unranked Rice Owls. Ole Miss won, 14–6. After winning the game, the Rebels were named national champion by the Football Writers Association of America (FWAA), although Minnesota was the pick of AP and Coaches' Polls.

In the first quarter, Rebels quarterback Jake Gibbs scored on an 8-yard touchdown run. In the third quarter, Rice scored on a 2-yard run by Blume, but the extra point missed and Rice was still trailing, 7–6. In the fourth quarter, Ole Miss put the game away with a 3-yard touchdown run from Gibbs as Ole Miss won, 14–6. Rice won the statistical battle, but their quarterback threw 4 interceptions, and the team made some key mistakes.

Jake Gibbs was named the game's MVP.
