= 1960 SMU Mustangs football team =

College football season

1960 SMU Mustangs football
- Conference: Southwest Conference
- Record: 0–9–1 (0–6–1 SWC)
- Head coach: Bill Meek (4th season)
- Captains: Glynn Gregory; Jerry May
- Home stadium: Cotton Bowl

1960 Southwest Conference football standings
	Conf.					Overall
Team	W		L		T	W		L		T
No. 7 Arkansas $	6	–	1	–	0	8	–	3	–	0
No. 12 Baylor	5	–	2	–	0	8	–	3	–	0
Texas	5	–	2	–	0	7	–	3	–	1
Rice	5	–	2	–	0	7	–	4	–	0
TCU	3	–	3	–	1	4	–	4	–	2
Texas Tech	1	–	5	–	1	3	–	6	–	1
Texas A&M	0	–	4	–	3	1	–	6	–	3
SMU	0	–	6	–	1	0	–	9	–	1
$ – Conference champion; Rankings from AP Poll

The 1960 SMU Mustangs football team represented Southern Methodist University (SMU) as a member of the Southwest Conference (SWC) during the 1960 college football season. Led by fourth-year head coach Bill Meek, the Mustangs compiled an overall record of 0–9–1 with a conference mark of 0–6–1, placing last out of eight teams in the SWC. The team went winless, with a scoreless tie against Texas A&M.

== Schedule ==
Date	Opponent	Site	Result	Attendance	Source
September 17	at Missouri*	Memorial Stadium; Columbia, MO	L 0–20	26,500	
September 24	at No. 20 Ohio State*	Ohio Stadium; Columbus, OH	L 0–24	84,496	
October 8	vs. No. 6 Navy*	Foreman Field; Norfolk, VA (Oyster Bowl)	L 7–26	30,000	
October 15	Rice	Cotton Bowl; Dallas, TX (rivalry)	L 0–47	26,500	
October 22	at Texas Tech	Jones Stadium; Lubbock, TX	L 7–28	32,000	
October 29	at Texas	Memorial Stadium; Austin, TX	L 7–17	34,000	
November 5	Texas A&M	Cotton Bowl; Dallas, TX	T 0–0	35,000	
November 12	at No. 9 Arkansas	Razorback Stadium; Fayetteville, AR	L 3–26	31,500	
November 19	Baylor	Cotton Bowl; Dallas, TX	L 7–20	23,000	
November 26	TCU	Cotton Bowl; Dallas, TX (rivalry)	L 0–13	20,000	
*Non-conference game; Rankings from AP Poll released prior to the game
