= Jack Henry (American football, born 1926) =

American football player and coach (1926–2018)

Biographical details
- Born: March 1, 1926; San Antonio, Texas, U.S.
- Died: September 2, 2018 (aged 92); San Antonio, Texas, U.S.

Playing career

Football
- 1948–1949: Southwest Texas State

Basketball
- 1948–1950: Southwest Texas State

Baseball
- 1949–1950: Southwest Texas State

Coaching career (HC unless noted)

Football
- 1951–1957: Mercedes HS (TX)
- 1958–1959: McAllen HS (TX)
- 1960: Southwest Texas State
- 1961–1964: Harlingen HS (TX)
- 1965–1969: Robstown HS (TX)
- 1970: Pearland HS (TX)
- 1974: Marble Falls HS (TX)

Head coaching record
- Overall: 2–8 (college)

Jack R. Henry (March 1, 1926 – September 2, 2018) was an American football player and coach. He served as the head football coach at Texas State University (then known as Southwest Texas State University) for a single season, in 1960, compiling a record of 2–8.

Henry was a multiple-sport athlete at Southwest Texas State and was later inducted into the Texas High School Coaches Association Hall of Fame.

== Head coaching record ==
=== College ===
Year	Team	Overall	Conference	Standing	Bowl/playoffs
Southwest Texas State Bobcats (Lone Star Conference) (1960)
1960	Southwest Texas State	2–8	1–6	T–7th	
Southwest Texas State:		2–8	1–6		
Total:		2–8			
