= 1960 Stanford Indians football team =

American college football season

1960 Stanford Indians football
- Conference: Athletic Association of Western Universities
- Record: 0–10 (0–4 AAWU)
- Head coach: Jack Curtice (3rd season)
- Home stadium: Stanford Stadium

1960 Athletic Association of Western Universities football standings
	Conf.					Overall
Team	W		L		T	W		L		T
No. 6 Washington $	4	–	0	–	0	10	–	1	–	0
USC	3	–	1	–	0	4	–	6	–	0
UCLA	2	–	2	–	0	7	–	2	–	1
California	1	–	3	–	0	2	–	7	–	1
Stanford	0	–	4	–	0	0	–	10	–	0
$ – Conference champion; Rankings from AP poll

The 1960 Stanford Indians football team represented Stanford University in the 1960 college football season. Stanford was led by third-year head coach Jack Curtice, and played their home games on campus at Stanford Stadium in Stanford, California.

This was the second winless season in Stanford history, after the 1947 season; these were the only two winless seasons in the history of Stanford football.

== Schedule ==
Date	Opponent	Site	Result	Attendance	Source
September 17	at Washington State*	Memorial Stadium; Spokane, WA	L 14–15	22,000	
September 24	Wisconsin*	Stanford Stadium; Stanford, CA	L 7–24	29,500	
October 1	at Air Force*	DU Stadium; Denver, CO	L 9–32	20,194	
October 8	No. 12 Washington	Stanford Stadium; Stanford, CA	L 10–29	23,500	
October 15	San Jose State*	Stanford Stadium; Stanford, CA (rivalry)	L 20–34	33,000	
October 22	at No. 19 UCLA	Los Angeles Memorial Coliseum; Los Angeles, CA	L 8–26	39,926	
October 29	USC	Stanford Stadium; Stanford, CA (rivalry)	L 6–21	29,000	
November 5	at Oregon*	Multnomah Stadium; Portland, OR	L 6–27	18,727	
November 12	Oregon State*	Stanford Stadium; Stanford, CA	L 21–25	7,500	
November 19	at California	California Memorial Stadium; Berkeley, CA (63rd Big Game)	L 10–21	76,200	
*Non-conference game; Rankings from AP Poll released prior to the game; Source:
