= 1960 Lamar Tech Cardinals football team =

American college football season

1960 Lamar Tech Cardinals football
- Conference: Lone Star Conference
- Record: 8–4 (5–2 LSC)
- Head coach: James B. Higgins (8th season)
- Home stadium: Greenie Stadium

1960 Lone Star Conference football standings
	Conf.					Overall
Team	W		L		T	W		L		T
No. 3 Texas A&I $	6	–	1	–	0	8	–	1	–	1
East Texas State	5	–	2	–	0	6	–	4	–	0
Lamar Tech	5	–	2	–	0	8	–	4	–	0
Howard Payne	4	–	3	–	0	6	–	4	–	0
Sul Ross	4	–	3	–	0	7	–	3	–	0
Sam Houston State	2	–	5	–	0	3	–	6	–	0
Southwest Texas State	1	–	6	–	0	2	–	8	–	0
Stephen F. Austin	1	–	6	–	0	1	–	10	–	0
$ – Conference champion; Rankings from NAIA poll

The 1960 Lamar Tech Cardinals football team represented Lamar State College of Technology—now known as Lamar University—as a member of the Lone Star Conference (LSC) during the 1960 college football season. Led by eighth-year head coach James B. Higgins, the Cardinals compiled an overall record of 8–4 with a mark of 5–2 in conference play conference, tying for second place in the LSC.

== Schedule ==
Date	Opponent	Site	Result	Attendance	Source
September 10	vs. Mexico Polytechical Institute*	Indian Stadium; Port Neches, TX	W 42–6	2,000	
September 17	at Louisiana Tech*	Tech Stadium; Ruston, LA	L 0–20	7,500	
September 24	at Northwestern State*	Demon Field; Natchitoches, LA	W 21–13	6,500	
October 1	Abilene Christian*	Greenie Stadium; Beaumont, TX	L 7–20	7,500	
October 8	at Stephen F. Austin	Memorial Stadium; Nacogdoches, TX	W 14–0		
October 15	at Sul Ross	Jackson Field; Alpine, TX	W 20–6		
October 22	Southwest Texas State	Greenie Stadium; Beaumont, TX	W 7–0		
October 29	Howard Payne	Lion Stadium; Brownwood, TX	W 12–7		
November 5	Texas A&I	Greenie Stadium; Beaumont, TX	L 0–40		
November 12	at East Texas State	Memorial Stadium; Commerce, TX	L 0–27		
November 19	Sam Houston State	Greenie Stadium; Beaumont, TX	W 18–7		
November 24	South Dakota*	Greenie Stadium; Beaumont, TX	W 41–21		
*Non-conference game
