= 1960 Louisiana Tech Bulldogs football team =

American college football season

1960 Louisiana Tech Bulldogs football

GSC co-champion
- Conference: Gulf States Conference
- Record: 8–2 (4–1 GSC)
- Head coach: Joe Aillet (20th season)
- Captains: Jim Campbell; Joe Hinton; Jerry Hudson
- Home stadium: Tech Stadium

1960 Gulf States Conference football standings
	Conf.					Overall
Team	W		L		T	W		L		T
No. 5 Southeastern Louisiana +	4	–	1	–	0	9	–	1	–	0
No. 12 Louisiana Tech +	4	–	1	–	0	8	–	2	–	0
McNeese State	3	–	2	–	0	7	–	3	–	0
Southwestern Louisiana	3	–	2	–	0	6	–	4	–	0
Northeast Louisiana State	1	–	4	–	0	3	–	7	–	0
Northwestern State	0	–	5	–	0	3	–	6	–	0
+ – Conference co-champions; Rankings from NAIA poll

The 1960 Louisiana Tech Bulldogs football team was an American football team that represented the Louisiana Polytechnic Institute (now known as Louisiana Tech University) as a member of the Gulf States Conference during the 1960 college football season. In their twentieth year under head coach Joe Aillet, the team compiled a 8–2 record and finished as Gulf States Conference co-champion.

== Schedule ==
Date	Opponent	Site	Result	Attendance	Source
September 17	Lamar Tech*	Tech Stadium; Ruston, LA	W 20–0	7,500	
September 24	at Arkansas State*	Kays Stadium; Jonesboro, AR	L 3–7	6,500	
October 1	McNeese State	Tech Stadium; Ruston, LA	W 15–14	7,500	
October 8	at Southwestern Louisiana	McNaspy Stadium; Lafayette, LA (rivalry)	L 2–6	12,000	
October 15	Pensacola Navy*	Tech Stadium; Ruston, LA	W 28–19	7,500	
October 22	vs. Northwestern State	State Fair Stadium; Shreveport, LA (rivalry)	W 13–7	18,000–18,500	
October 29	McMurry*	Tech Stadium; Ruston, LA	W 23–7	5,500	
November 5	Southeastern Louisiana	Tech Stadium; Ruston, LA	W 17–14	8,000	
November 12	at Mississippi Southern*	Faulkner Field; Hattiesburg, MS (rivalry)	W 10–7	12,000	
November 19	at Northeast Louisiana State	Brown Stadium; Monroe, LA (rivalry)	W 20–15	6,000	
*Non-conference game
