= 1960 Southwestern Louisiana Bulldogs football team =

American college football season

1960 Southwestern Louisiana Bulldogs football
- Conference: Gulf States Conference
- Record: 6–4 (3–3 GSC)
- Head coach: Red Hoggatt (3rd season)
- Home stadium: McNaspy Stadium

1960 Gulf States Conference football standings
	Conf.					Overall
Team	W		L		T	W		L		T
No. 5 Southeastern Louisiana +	4	–	1	–	0	9	–	1	–	0
No. 12 Louisiana Tech +	4	–	1	–	0	8	–	2	–	0
McNeese State	3	–	2	–	0	7	–	3	–	0
Southwestern Louisiana	3	–	2	–	0	6	–	4	–	0
Northeast Louisiana State	1	–	4	–	0	3	–	7	–	0
Northwestern State	0	–	5	–	0	3	–	6	–	0
+ – Conference co-champions; Rankings from NAIA poll

The 1960 Southwestern Louisiana Bulldogs football team was an American football team that represented the University of Southwestern Louisiana (now known as the University of Louisiana at Lafayette) in the Gulf States Conference during the 1960 college football season. In their third year under head coach Red Hoggatt, the team compiled a 6–4 record.

== Schedule ==
Date	Opponent	Site	Result	Attendance	Source
September 17	Southeastern Louisiana	McNaspy Stadium; Lafayette, LA (rivalry)	L 10–20	7,500	
September 24	at Sam Houston State*	Pritchett Field; Huntsville, TX	W 8–3	500	
October 1	at Stephen F. Austin*	Memorial Stadium; Nacogdoches, TX	W 36–0	3,700	
October 8	Louisiana Tech	McNaspy Stadium; Lafayette, LA (rivalry)	W 6–2	7,000	
October 15	Arlington State*	McNaspy Stadium; Lafayette, LA	L 7–13	6,000–10,000	
October 22	Louisiana College*	McNaspy Stadium; Lafayette, LA	L 7–13	4,000	
October 29	Northeast Louisiana State^{†}	McNaspy Stadium; Lafayette, LA (rivalry)	W 8–7	5,000–7,200	
November 5	Pensacola Navy*	McNaspy Stadium; Lafayette, LA	W 20–14	4,000	
November 12	at Northwestern State	Demon Stadium; Natchitoches, LA	W 17–7	3,300	
November 19	at McNeese State	Wildcat Stadium; Lake Charles, LA (rivalry)	L 18–28	6,000	
*Non-conference game; ^{†}Homecoming
