= 1960 Southwest Texas State Bobcats football team =

American college football season

1960 Southwest Texas State Bobcats football
- Conference: Lone Star Conference
- Record: 2–8 (1–6 LSC)
- Head coach: Jack Henry (1st season)
- Home stadium: Evans Field

1960 Lone Star Conference football standings
	Conf.					Overall
Team	W		L		T	W		L		T
No. 3 Texas A&I $	6	–	1	–	0	8	–	1	–	1
East Texas State	5	–	2	–	0	6	–	4	–	0
Lamar Tech	5	–	2	–	0	8	–	4	–	0
Howard Payne	4	–	3	–	0	6	–	4	–	0
Sul Ross	4	–	3	–	0	7	–	3	–	0
Sam Houston State	2	–	5	–	0	3	–	6	–	0
Southwest Texas State	1	–	6	–	0	2	–	8	–	0
Stephen F. Austin	1	–	6	–	0	1	–	10	–	0
$ – Conference champion; Rankings from NAIA poll

The 1960 Southwest Texas State Bobcats football team was an American football team that represented Southwest Texas State College (now known as Texas State University) during the 1960 college football season as a member of the Lone Star Conference (LSC). In their first year under head coach Jack Henry, the team compiled an overall record of 2–8 with a mark of 1–6 in conference play.

== Schedule ==
Date	Opponent	Site	Result	Source
September 17	Texas Lutheran*	Evans Field; San Marcos, TX	L 7–39	
September 24	at Corpus Christi*	Tarpon Field; Corpus Christi, TX	W 15–6	
October 1	Sul Ross	Evans Field; San Marcos, TX	L 7–20	
October 8	at McMurry*	Public Schools Stadium; Abilene, TX	L 18–23	
October 15	Stephen F. Austin	Evans Field; San Marcos, TX	W 17–0	
October 22	at Lamar Tech	Greenie Stadium; Beaumont, TX	L 0–7	
October 29	at Sam Houston State	Pritchett Field; Huntsville, TX (rivalry)	L 0–9	
November 5	East Texas State	Evans Field; San Marcos, TX	L 0–12	
November 12	at Howard Payne	Lion Stadium; Brownwood, TX	L 0–18	
November 19	Texas A&I	Evans Field; San Marcos, TX	L 0–35	
*Non-conference game
