= 1960 USC Trojans football team =

American college football season

1960 USC Trojans football
- Conference: Athletic Association of Western Universities
- Record: 4–6 (3–1 AAWU)
- Head coach: John McKay (1st season)
- Captains: Mike McKeever; George Van Vliet
- Home stadium: Los Angeles Memorial Coliseum

1960 Athletic Association of Western Universities football standings
	Conf.					Overall
Team	W		L		T	W		L		T
No. 6 Washington $	4	–	0	–	0	10	–	1	–	0
USC	3	–	1	–	0	4	–	6	–	0
UCLA	2	–	2	–	0	7	–	2	–	1
California	1	–	3	–	0	2	–	7	–	1
Stanford	0	–	4	–	0	0	–	10	–	0
$ – Conference champion; Rankings from AP poll

The 1960 USC Trojans football team represented the University of Southern California (USC) in the 1960 college football season. In their first year under head coach John McKay, the Trojans compiled a 4–6 record (3–1 against conference opponents), finished in second place in the Athletic Association of Western Universities, and were outscored by their opponents by a combined total of 152 to 95.

Bill Nelsen led the team in passing with 29 of 72 passes completed for 446 yards, three touchdowns and three interceptions. Marlin McKeever was the leading receiver with 15 catches for 218 yards. Hal Tobin was the leading rusher with 318 yard on 61 carries.

== Schedule ==
Date	Opponent	Rank	Site	Result	Attendance	Source
September 16	Oregon State*	No. 6	Los Angeles Memorial Coliseum; Los Angeles, CA	L 0–14	32,928	
September 24	TCU*		Los Angeles Memorial Coliseum; Los Angeles, CA	L 6–7	31,475	
October 1	at No. 9 Ohio State*		Ohio Stadium; Columbus, OH	L 0–20	83,204	
October 7	Georgia*		Los Angeles Memorial Coliseum; Los Angeles, CA	W 10–3	28,120	
October 15	California		Los Angeles Memorial Coliseum; Los Angeles, CA	W 27–10	39,830	
October 29	at Stanford		Stanford Stadium; Stanford, CA (rivalry)	W 21–10	29,000	
November 5	No. 7 Washington		Los Angeles Memorial Coliseum; Los Angeles, CA	L 0–34	43,475	
November 12	at Baylor*		Baylor Stadium; Waco, TX	L 14–35	23,000	
November 19	at No. 11 UCLA		Los Angeles Memorial Coliseum; Los Angeles, CA (Victory Bell)	W 17–6	66,865	
November 26	Notre Dame*		Los Angeles Memorial Coliseum; Los Angeles, CA (rivalry)	L 0–17	28,297	
*Non-conference game; Rankings from AP Poll released prior to the game; Source:

== Game summaries ==
=== At Ohio State ===
USC Trojans (0–2) at #9 Ohio State Buckeyes (1–0)

Quarter	1	2	3	4	Total
USC	0	0	0	0	0
Ohio St	6	7	0	7	20

at Ohio Stadium, Columbus, Ohio

- Date: October 1, 1960
- Game weather: Sunny, 64 °F (18 °C)
- Game attendance: 83,204
- Box Score

Team	Category	Player	Statistics
USC	Passing	Ben Charles	4/8, 46 Yds, 2 INT
USC	Rushing	Ben Wilson	3 Rush, 29 Yds
USC	Receiving	Marlin McKeever	1 Rec, 29 Yds
Ohio St	Passing	Tom Matte	6/11, 78 Yds, INT
Ohio St	Rushing	Bob Ferguson	20 Rush, 157 Yds, 3 TD
Ohio St	Receiving	Charles Bryant	2 Rec, 28 Yds

Scoring summary

Quarter	Time	Drive			Team	Scoring information	Score	
Quarter	Time	Plays	Yards	TOP	Team	Scoring information	USC	OSU
1	8:25	1	74	0:19	Ohio St	Ben Ferguson 74-yard touchdown run, Ben Jones kick no good (blocked)	0	6
2	4:36	8	57	4:10	Ohio St	Bob Ferguson 2-yard touchdown run, Ben Jones kick good	0	13
4	4:36	9	75	4:12	Ohio St	Bob Ferguson 19-yard touchdown run, Ben Jones kick good	0	20
"TOP" = time of possession. For other American football terms, see Glossary of American football.							0	20

== Personnel ==
1960 USC Trojans football team roster
Players
Coaches
Offense

Pos.	#	Name	Class
QB		Ben Charles
E		Marlin McKeever
QB		Bill Nelsen
		George Van Vliet
FB		Ben Wilson

Defense

Pos.	#	Name	Class

Special teams

Pos.	#	Name	Class

Head coach

- John McKay

Coordinators/assistant coaches

Legend

- (C) Team captain
- (S) Suspended
- (I) Ineligible
- Injured
- Redshirt
