= 1960 Vanderbilt Commodores football team =

American college football season

1960 Vanderbilt Commodores football
- Conference: Southeastern Conference
- Record: 3–7 (0–7 SEC)
- Head coach: Art Guepe (8th season)
- Home stadium: Dudley Field

1960 Southeastern Conference football standings
	Conf.					Overall
Team	W		L		T	W		L		T
No. 2 Ole Miss $	5	–	0	–	1	10	–	0	–	1
No. 18 Florida	5	–	1	–	0	9	–	2	–	0
No. 9 Alabama	5	–	1	–	1	8	–	1	–	2
No. 13 Auburn	5	–	2	–	0	8	–	2	–	0
Tennessee	3	–	2	–	2	6	–	2	–	2
Georgia	4	–	3	–	0	6	–	4	–	0
Georgia Tech	4	–	4	–	0	5	–	5	–	0
LSU	2	–	3	–	1	5	–	4	–	1
Kentucky	2	–	4	–	1	5	–	4	–	1
Tulane	1	–	4	–	1	3	–	6	–	1
Mississippi State	0	–	5	–	1	2	–	6	–	1
Vanderbilt	0	–	7	–	0	3	–	7	–	0
$ – Conference champion; Rankings from AP Poll

The 1960 Vanderbilt Commodores football team represented Vanderbilt University in the 1960 college football season. The Commodores were led by head coach Art Guepe in his eighth season and finished the season with a record of three wins and seven losses (3–7 overall, 0–7 in the SEC).

== Schedule ==
Date	Opponent	Site	Result	Attendance	Source
September 24	Georgia	Dudley Field; Nashville, TN (rivalry)	L 7–18	26,500	
October 1	at No. 15 Alabama	Legion Field; Birmingham, AL	L 0–21	41,000	
October 8	No. 2 Ole Miss	Dudley Field; Nashville, TN (rivalry)	L 0–26	23,000	
October 15	at Florida	Florida Field; Gainesville, FL	L 0–12	31,000	
October 22	at Marquette*	Marquette Stadium; Milwaukee, WI	W 23–6	17,100	
October 29	Clemson*	Dudley Field; Nashville, TN	W 22–20	18,000	
November 5	at Kentucky	McLean Stadium; Lexington, KY (rivalry)	L 0–27	28,000	
November 12	William & Mary*	Dudley Field; Nashville, TN	W 22–8		
November 19	Tulane	Dudley Field; Nashville, TN	L 0–20	16,000	
November 26	Tennessee	Dudley Field; Nashville, TN (rivalry)	L 0–35	34,000	
*Non-conference game; Rankings from AP Poll released prior to the game
