= 1960 UCLA Bruins football team =

American college football season

1960 UCLA Bruins football
- Conference: Athletic Association of Western Universities
- Record: 7–2–1 (2–2 AAWU)
- Head coach: Bill Barnes (3rd season)
- Home stadium: Los Angeles Memorial Coliseum

1960 Athletic Association of Western Universities football standings
	Conf.					Overall
Team	W		L		T	W		L		T
No. 6 Washington $	4	–	0	–	0	10	–	1	–	0
USC	3	–	1	–	0	4	–	6	–	0
UCLA	2	–	2	–	0	7	–	2	–	1
California	1	–	3	–	0	2	–	7	–	1
Stanford	0	–	4	–	0	0	–	10	–	0
$ – Conference champion; Rankings from AP poll

The 1960 UCLA Bruins football team was an American football team that represented the University of California, Los Angeles (UCLA) as a member of the Athletic Association of Western Universities (AAWU) during the 1960 college football season. In their third-year under head coach Bill Barnes, the Bruins compiled an overall record of 7–2–1 record with a mark of 2–2 in conference play, placing third in the AAWU.

UCLA's offensive leaders in 1960 were quarterback Billy Kilmer with 1,086 passing yards each, Kilmer with 803 rushing yards, and Gene Gaines with 258 receiving yards.

== Schedule ==
Date	Opponent	Rank	Site	Result	Attendance	Source
September 17	No. 7 Pittsburgh*		Los Angeles Memorial Coliseum; Los Angeles, CA	W 8–7	36,056	
September 24	at Purdue*	No. 8	Ross–Ade Stadium; West Lafayette, IN	T 27–27	48,542	
October 15	at No. 13 Washington	No. 15	Husky Stadium; Seattle, WA	L 8–10	54,152	
October 22	Stanford	No. 19	Los Angeles Memorial Coliseum; Los Angeles, CA	W 26–8	39,926	
October 29	NC State*		Los Angeles Memorial Coliseum; Los Angeles, CA	W 7–0	27,637	
November 5	at California	No. 15	California Memorial Stadium; Berkeley, CA (rivalry)	W 28–0	31,000	
November 12	Air Force*	No. 11	Los Angeles Memorial Coliseum; Los Angeles, CA	W 22–0	21,914	
November 19	USC	No. 11	Los Angeles Memorial Coliseum; Los Angeles, CA (Victory)	L 6–17	66,865	
November 26	at Utah*		Ute Stadium; Salt Lake City, UT	W 16–9	17,099	
December 3	No. 10 Duke*		Los Angeles Memorial Coliseum; Los Angeles, CA	W 27–6	23,357	
*Non-conference game; Rankings from AP Poll released prior to the game; Source:

== Roster ==
- QB Billy Kilmer, Sr.
