= 1960 Sam Houston State Bearkats football team =

American college football season

1960 Sam Houston State Bearkats football
- Conference: Lone Star Conference
- Record: 3–6 (2–5 LSC)
- Head coach: Paul Pierce (9th season)
- Home stadium: Pritchett Field

1960 Lone Star Conference football standings
	Conf.					Overall
Team	W		L		T	W		L		T
No. 3 Texas A&I $	6	–	1	–	0	8	–	1	–	1
East Texas State	5	–	2	–	0	6	–	4	–	0
Lamar Tech	5	–	2	–	0	8	–	4	–	0
Howard Payne	4	–	3	–	0	6	–	4	–	0
Sul Ross	4	–	3	–	0	7	–	3	–	0
Sam Houston State	2	–	5	–	0	3	–	6	–	0
Southwest Texas State	1	–	6	–	0	2	–	8	–	0
Stephen F. Austin	1	–	6	–	0	1	–	10	–	0
$ – Conference champion; Rankings from NAIA poll

The 1960 Sam Houston State Bearkats football team represented Sam Houston State Teachers College (now known as Sam Houston State University) as a member of the Lone Star Conference (LSC) during the 1960 NAIA football season. Led by ninth-year head coach Paul Pierce, the Bearkats compiled an overall record of 3–6 with a mark of 2–5 in conference play, and finished sixth in the LSC.

== Schedule ==
Date	Opponent	Site	Result	Attendance	Source
September 17	Southwestern State (OK)*	Pritchett Field; Huntsville, TX	W 28–0		
September 24	Southwestern Louisiana*	Pritchett Field; Huntsville, TX	L 3–8		
October 8	at Howard Payne	Lion Field; Brownwood, TX	L 0–6		
October 15	East Texas State	Pritchett Field; Huntsville, TX	L 0–22		
October 22	at Texas A&I	Javelina Stadium; Kingsville, TX	L 13–18		
October 29	Southwest Texas State	Pritchett Field; Huntsville, TX	W 9–0		
November 5	at Sul Ross	Jackson Field; Alpine, TX	L 0–8		
November 12	Stephen F. Austin	Pritchett Field; Huntsville, TX (rivalry)	W 16–7	5,000	
November 19	at Lamar Tech	Greenie Stadium; Beaumont, TX	L 7–18		
*Non-conference game
