= 1960 Tampa Spartans football team =

American college football season

1960 Tampa Spartans football
- Conference: Independent
- Record: 2–7–1
- Head coach: Marcelino Huerta (9th season)
- Home stadium: Phillips Field

1960 Southern non-major college football independents records
	Conf.			Overall
Team	W	L	T	W		L		T
Washington and Lee		–		8	–	0	–	1
Arlington State		–		9	–	2	–	0
Howard (AL)		–		8	–	1	–	0
Louisville		–		7	–	2	–	0
Mississippi Southern		–		6	–	4	–	0
Sewanee		–		4	–	3	–	1
Abilene Christian		–		5	–	5	–	0
Chattanooga		–		5	–	5	–	0
Arkansas State		–		4	–	5	–	0
Tampa		–		2	–	7	–	1
Trinity (TX)		–		2	–	7	–	1

The 1960 Tampa Spartans football team represented the University of Tampa in the 1960 college football season. It was the Spartans' 24th season. The team was led by head coach Marcelino Huerta, in his ninth year, and played their home games at Phillips Field in Tampa, Florida. They finished with a record of two wins, seven losses and one tie (2–7–1).

After they opened the season at home with a 7–7 tie against Furman, the Spartans lost on the road at Western Carolina and Tennessee. After the Spartans won the first game of the season over Elon, they lost to both McNeese State and Southeastern Louisiana before they defeated Troy State on homecoming for their second win of the season. The Spartans then closed their season with three consecutive losses against McMurry and Alabama on the road and at home against Appalachian State.

== Schedule ==
Date	Opponent	Site	Result	Attendance	Source
September 24	Furman	Phillips Field; Tampa, FL	T 7–7	5,500–6,500	
October 1	at Western Carolina	Memorial Stadium; Asheville, NC	L 8–28	4,000	
October 8	at Tennessee	Shields–Watkins Field; Knoxville, TN	L 7–62	19,945	
October 15	Elon	Phillips Field; Tampa, FL	W 21–0	4,000	
October 22	McNeese State	Phillips Field; Tampa, FL	L 0–3	3,500–4,500	
October 29	Southeastern Louisiana	Phillips Field; Tampa, FL	L 12–28	7,000	
November 5	Troy State^{†}	Phillips Field; Tampa, FL	W 22–7	5,000–10,000	
November 12	at McMurry	Public Schools Stadium; Abilene, TX	L 8–41	6,000	
November 19	at No. 18 Alabama	Denny Stadium; Tuscaloosa, AL	L 6–34	19,000	
November 26	Appalachian State	Phillips Field; Tampa, FL	L 15–22	3,500	
^{†}Homecoming; Rankings from AP Poll released prior to the game
