= 1960 Washington Huskies football team =

American college football season

1960 Washington Huskies football

HAF national champion Rose Bowl champion AAWU champion

Rose Bowl, W 17–7 vs. Minnesota
- Conference: Athletic Association of Western Universities

Ranking
- Coaches: No. 5
- AP: No. 6
- Record: 10–1 (4–0 AAWU)
- Head coach: Jim Owens (4th season)
- Captain: Game captains
- Home stadium: University of Washington Stadium

1960 Athletic Association of Western Universities football standings
	Conf.					Overall
Team	W		L		T	W		L		T
No. 6 Washington $	4	–	0	–	0	10	–	1	–	0
USC	3	–	1	–	0	4	–	6	–	0
UCLA	2	–	2	–	0	7	–	2	–	1
California	1	–	3	–	0	2	–	7	–	1
Stanford	0	–	4	–	0	0	–	10	–	0
$ – Conference champion; Rankings from AP poll

The 1960 Washington Huskies football team represented the University of Washington during the 1960 college football season. Home games were played on campus in Seattle at Husky Stadium, known at the time as University of Washington Stadium. Under fourth-year head coach Jim Owens, Washington was 9–1 in the regular season, 4–0 in the Athletic Association of Western Universities (AAWU), defeated top-ranked Minnesota in the Rose Bowl, and outscored its opponents 272 to 107. The Helms Athletic Foundation, which considered bowl games in its ranking, awarded the Huskies the national championship.

The University of Washington officially recognized the 1960 football team as national champions in 2007, wearing throwback uniforms in their game vs. USC. A flag was raised over Husky Stadium honoring the team as national champions.

Led on the field by senior quarterback Bob Schloredt, an All-American the previous year, the Huskies started the season ranked third. Schloredt broke his collarbone in the fifth game, against UCLA, and did not play again in the regular season. Bob Hivner took over as quarterback and won the game plus the next five.

A one-point loss on a last-minute field goal by Orange Bowl-bound Navy two weeks earlier in Seattle was the season's only blemish. The Huskies returned to the Rose Bowl to meet the top-ranked Minnesota Golden Gophers of the Big Ten Conference on January 2. A seven-point underdog, sixth-ranked Washington upset Minnesota 17–7 for consecutive Rose Bowl wins. Schloredt returned at quarterback and was the player of the game for a second straight year.

The final rankings in this era were released at the end of the regular season (in late November), prior to the bowl games. Washington was ranked fifth and sixth in the respective polls.

== Schedule ==
Date	Opponent	Rank	Site	Result	Attendance	Source
September 17	Pacific (CA)*	No. 3	University of Washington Stadium; Seattle, WA	W 55–6	39,047	
September 24	Idaho*	No. 3	University of Washington Stadium; Seattle, WA	W 41–12	35,996	
October 1	No. 17 Navy*	No. 3	University of Washington Stadium; Seattle, WA	L 14–15	57,379	
October 8	at Stanford	No. 12	Stanford Stadium; Stanford, CA	W 29–10	23,500	
October 15	No. 15 UCLA	No. 13	University of Washington Stadium; Seattle, WA	W 10–8	54,152	
October 22	at No. 18 Oregon State*	No. 8	Multnomah Stadium; Portland, OR	W 30–29	36,833	
October 29	Oregon*	No. 9	University of Washington Stadium; Seattle, WA (rivalry)	W 7–6	55,235	
November 5	at USC	No. 7	Los Angeles Memorial Coliseum; Los Angeles, CA	W 34–0	43,475	
November 12	California^{†}	No. 6	University of Washington Stadium; Seattle, WA	W 27–7	55,884	
November 19	at Washington State*	No. 5	Memorial Stadium; Spokane, WA (rivalry)	W 8–7	28,750	
January 2, 1961	vs. No. 1 Minnesota*	No. 6	Rose Bowl; Pasadena, CA (Rose Bowl)	W 17–7	97,314	
*Non-conference game; ^{†}Homecoming; Rankings from AP Poll released prior to the game; Source:

== Coaching staff ==
- Bert Clark
- Tom Tipps
- Don White

== Professional football draft selections ==
Six University of Washington Huskies were selected in the 1961 NFL draft, which lasted 20 rounds with 280 selections. Four Huskies were selected in the 1961 AFL draft, which lasted 30 rounds with 240 selections; three of the four were also selected in the NFL draft.

= Husky Hall of Fame

League	Player	Position	Round	Pick	Franchise
NFL	Ben Davidson	Tackle	4th	46	New York Giants
NFL	George Fleming	Halfback	6th	76	Chicago Bears
NFL	Lee Folkins	End	6th	82	Green Bay Packers
NFL	Bill Kinnune	Guard	11th	148	St. Louis Cardinals
NFL	Chuck Allen	Guard	17th	228	Los Angeles Rams
NFL	Don McKeta	Back	20th	277	New York Giants
AFL	George Fleming	Halfback	2nd	12	Oakland Raiders
AFL	Bill Kinnune	Guard	26th	207	Los Angeles Chargers
AFL	Bob Schloredt	Quarterback	27th	214	Dallas Texans
AFL	Chuck Allen	Guard	28th	223	Los Angeles Chargers
