= Charlie Rieves =

American football player (1939–2020)

No. 32, 48, 30
- Position: Linebacker

Personal information
- Born: January 6, 1939; Stuttgart, Arkansas, U.S.
- Died: December 24, 2020 (aged 81)
- Listed height: 6 ft 1 in (1.85 m)
- Listed weight: 218 lb (99 kg)

Career information
- High school: Auguilla (MS)
- College: Houston
- NFL draft: 1962: undrafted

Career history
- Oakland Raiders (1962–1963); Houston Oilers (1964–1965)

Career NFL statistics
- Interceptions: 1
- Stats at Pro Football Reference

Charlie Rieves (January 6, 1939 – December 24, 2020) was an American professional football player who played linebacker for four seasons for the Oakland Raiders and Houston Oilers. He played a total of 38 games throughout his career.

Rieves died on December 24, 2020, at the age of 81.
