= 1960 LSU Tigers football team =

American college football season

1960 LSU Tigers football
- Conference: Southeastern Conference
- Record: 5–4–1 (2–3–1 SEC)
- Head coach: Paul Dietzel (6th season)
- Home stadium: Tiger Stadium

1960 Southeastern Conference football standings
| | Conf. | | | | | Overall |
| Team | W | | L | | T | W | | L | | T |
|---|---|---|---|---|---|---|---|---|---|---|
| No. 2 Ole Miss $ | 5 | – | 0 | – | 1 | 10 | – | 0 | – | 1 |
| No. 18 Florida | 5 | – | 1 | – | 0 | 9 | – | 2 | – | 0 |
| No. 9 Alabama | 5 | – | 1 | – | 1 | 8 | – | 1 | – | 2 |
| No. 13 Auburn | 5 | – | 2 | – | 0 | 8 | – | 2 | – | 0 |
| Tennessee | 3 | – | 2 | – | 2 | 6 | – | 2 | – | 2 |
| Georgia | 4 | – | 3 | – | 0 | 6 | – | 4 | – | 0 |
| Georgia Tech | 4 | – | 4 | – | 0 | 5 | – | 5 | – | 0 |
| LSU | 2 | – | 3 | – | 1 | 5 | – | 4 | – | 1 |
| Kentucky | 2 | – | 4 | – | 1 | 5 | – | 4 | – | 1 |
| Tulane | 1 | – | 4 | – | 1 | 3 | – | 6 | – | 1 |
| Mississippi State | 0 | – | 5 | – | 1 | 2 | – | 6 | – | 1 |
| Vanderbilt | 0 | – | 7 | – | 0 | 3 | – | 7 | – | 0 |
$ – Conference champion; Rankings from AP Poll

The 1960 LSU Tigers football team was an American football team that represented Louisiana State University (LSU) as a member of the Southeastern Conference (SEC) during the 1960 college football season. In their sixth year under head coach Paul Dietzel, the Tigers compiled an overall record of 5–4–1, with a conference record of 2–3–1, and finished eighth in the SEC.

This was the only season between 1958 and 1965 that LSU did not play in a bowl game.

The game vs. Ole Miss was the Tigers' last visit to Oxford, Mississippi until 1989. The 6-6 tie denied the Rebels the consensus national championship, which instead went to Minnesota despite the Gophers' loss to Purdue. Ole Miss was named national champion by the Football Writers Association of America following their win vs. Rice in the Sugar Bowl.

== Schedule ==
| Date | Opponent | Rank | Site | Result | Attendance | Source |
|---|---|---|---|---|---|---|
| September 17 | Texas A&M* | | Tiger Stadium; Baton Rouge, LA (rivalry) | W 9–0 | 64,000 | |
| October 1 | Baylor* | No. 18 | Tiger Stadium; Baton Rouge, LA | L 3–7 | 57,662 | |
| October 8 | at Georgia Tech | | Grant Field; Atlanta, GA | L 2–6 | 44,176 | |
| October 15 | at Kentucky | | Stoll Field; Lexington, KY | L 0–3 | 28,000 | |
| October 22 | Florida | | Tiger Stadium; Baton Rouge, LA (rivalry) | L 10–13 | 51,528 | |
| October 29 | at No. 2 Ole Miss | | Hemingway Stadium; Oxford, MS (rivalry) | T 6–6 | 34,000 | |
| November 5 | South Carolina*^{†} | | Tiger Stadium; Baton Rouge, LA | W 35–6 | 52,650 | |
| November 12 | Mississippi State | | Tiger Stadium; Baton Rouge, LA (rivalry) | W 7–3 | 52,000 | |
| November 19 | Wake Forest* | | Tiger Stadium; Baton Rouge, LA | W 16–0 | 49,909 | |
| November 26 | at Tulane | | Tulane Stadium; New Orleans, LA (Battle for the Rag) | W 17–6 | 74,000 | |
*Non-conference game; ^{†}Homecoming; Rankings from Coaches' Poll released prior to the game
