= Gene Ready =

American politician

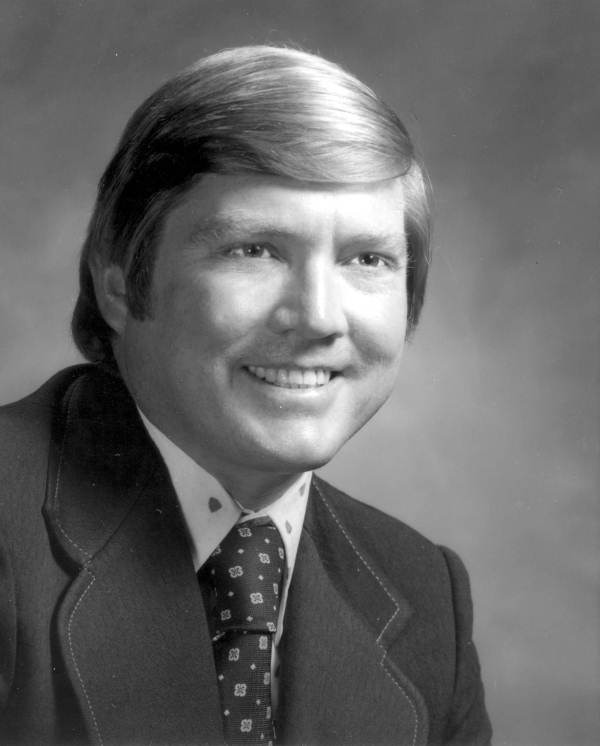

Member of the Florida House of Representatives for the 51st district
- In office 1977–1982

Member of the Florida House of Representatives from the 44th district
- In office 1983–1984

Personal details
- Born: May 27, 1941 Lakeland, Florida
- Died: December 12, 2015 (aged 74) Lakeland, Florida
- Party: Democratic
- Spouse: Barbara
- Children: Kelly, Kim
- Education: Florida State University
- Occupation: Real Estate and construction

Gene Ready (May 27, 1941 – December 12, 2015) was an American former politician in the state of Florida.

Ready was born in Lakeland, Florida. He attended Florida State University and earned a Bachelor of Science degree in 1964. He served as a Democrat in the Florida House of Representatives from 1977 to 1982, representing the 51st district, and from 1983 to 1984, this time representing the 44th district. Ready died of cancer on December 12, 2015, in Lakeland, Florida.
