= 1960 Georgia Bulldogs football team =

American college football season

1960 Georgia Bulldogs football
- Conference: Southeastern Conference
- Record: 6–4 (4–3 SEC)
- Head coach: Wally Butts (22nd season)
- Home stadium: Sanford Stadium

1960 Southeastern Conference football standings
	Conf.					Overall
Team	W		L		T	W		L		T
No. 2 Ole Miss $	5	–	0	–	1	10	–	0	–	1
No. 18 Florida	5	–	1	–	0	9	–	2	–	0
No. 9 Alabama	5	–	1	–	1	8	–	1	–	2
No. 13 Auburn	5	–	2	–	0	8	–	2	–	0
Tennessee	3	–	2	–	2	6	–	2	–	2
Georgia	4	–	3	–	0	6	–	4	–	0
Georgia Tech	4	–	4	–	0	5	–	5	–	0
LSU	2	–	3	–	1	5	–	4	–	1
Kentucky	2	–	4	–	1	5	–	4	–	1
Tulane	1	–	4	–	1	3	–	6	–	1
Mississippi State	0	–	5	–	1	2	–	6	–	1
Vanderbilt	0	–	7	–	0	3	–	7	–	0
$ – Conference champion; Rankings from AP Poll

The 1960 Georgia Bulldogs football team represented the University of Georgia as a member of the Southeastern Conference (SEC) during the 1960 college football season. Led by 22nd-year head coach Wally Butts, the Bulldogs compiled an overall record of 6–4 with a mark of 4–3 in conference play, and placed sixth in the SEC.

== Schedule ==
Date	Opponent	Rank	Site	TV	Result	Attendance	Source
September 17	at Alabama	No. 13	Legion Field; Birmingham, AL (rivalry)	ABC	L 6–21	36,000	
September 24	at Vanderbilt		Dudley Field; Nashville, TN (rivalry)		W 18–7	26,500	
October 1	South Carolina*		Sanford Stadium; Athens, GA (rivalry)		W 38–6	33,000	
October 7	at USC*		Los Angeles Memorial Coliseum; Los Angeles, CA		L 3–10	28,120	
October 15	Mississippi State		Sanford Stadium; Athens, GA		W 20–7	36,000	
October 22	at Kentucky		McLean Stadium; Lexington, KY		W 17–13	31,000	
October 29	Tulsa*^{†}		Sanford Stadium; Athens, GA		W 45–7	31,000	
November 5	vs. Florida		Gator Bowl Stadium; Jacksonville, FL (rivalry)		L 14–22	48,622	
November 12	at No. 10 Auburn		Cliff Hare Stadium; Auburn, AL (rivalry)		L 6–9	46,000	
November 26	Georgia Tech		Sanford Stadium; Athens, GA (rivalry)		W 7–6	55,000	
*Non-conference game; ^{†}Homecoming; Rankings from AP Poll released prior to the game

== Roster ==
- Fran Tarkenton, Sr. (C)
