= 1960 Rice Owls football team =

American college football season

1960 Rice Owls football

Sugar Bowl, L 6–14 vs. Ole Miss
- Conference: Southwest Conference
- Record: 7–4 (5–2 SWC)
- Head coach: Jess Neely (21st season)
- Home stadium: Rice Stadium

1960 Southwest Conference football standings
	Conf.					Overall
Team	W		L		T	W		L		T
No. 7 Arkansas $	6	–	1	–	0	8	–	3	–	0
No. 12 Baylor	5	–	2	–	0	8	–	3	–	0
Texas	5	–	2	–	0	7	–	3	–	1
Rice	5	–	2	–	0	7	–	4	–	0
TCU	3	–	3	–	1	4	–	4	–	2
Texas Tech	1	–	5	–	1	3	–	6	–	1
Texas A&M	0	–	4	–	3	1	–	6	–	3
SMU	0	–	6	–	1	0	–	9	–	1
$ – Conference champion; Rankings from AP Poll

The 1960 Rice Owls football team represented Rice University during the 1960 college football season. The Owls were led by 21st-year head coach Jess Neely and played their home games at Rice Stadium in Houston, Texas. They competed as members of the Southwest Conference, finishing tied for second. After losing the season opener to Georgia Tech, Rice went on a five game winning streak, reaching as high as 10th in the AP Poll. After losing to SWC foes Arkansas and Baylor, they dropped from the rankings. Regardless, Rice received an invitation to the 1961 Sugar Bowl, played on New Years Day, where they were defeated by co-national champion Ole Miss.

== Schedule ==
Date	Opponent	Rank	Site	Result	Attendance	Source
September 24	No. 13 Georgia Tech*		Rice Stadium; Houston, TX	L 13–16	35,000	
October 1	Tulane*		Rice Stadium; Houston, TX	W 10–7	30,000	
October 8	vs. No. 18 Florida*		Miami Orange Bowl; Miami, FL	W 10–0	17,535	
October 15	at SMU		Cotton Bowl; Dallas, TX (rivalry)	W 47–0	26,500	
October 22	No. 16 Texas	No. 20	Rice Stadium; Houston, TX (rivalry)	W 7–0	72,000	
October 29	Texas Tech	No. 13	Rice Stadium; Houston, TX	W 30–6	26,000	
November 5	at No. 16 Arkansas	No. 10	War Memorial Stadium; Little Rock, AR	L 0–3	40,000	
November 12	Texas A&M	No. 16	Rice Stadium; Houston, TX	W 21–14	50,000	
November 19	TCU	No. 14	Rice Stadium; Houston, TX	W 23–0	35,000	
November 26	at No. 19 Baylor	No. 12	Baylor Stadium; Waco, TX	L 7–12	30,000	
January 2	vs. No. 2 Ole Miss*		Tulane Stadium; New Orleans, LA (Sugar Bowl)	L 6–14	82,851	
*Non-conference game; Rankings from AP Poll released prior to the game
