= 1960 Tulane Green Wave football team =

American college football season

1960 Tulane Green Wave football
- Conference: Southeastern Conference
- Record: 3–6–1 (1–4–1 SEC)
- Head coach: Andy Pilney (7th season)
- Home stadium: Tulane Stadium

1960 Southeastern Conference football standings
	Conf.					Overall
Team	W		L		T	W		L		T
No. 2 Ole Miss $	5	–	0	–	1	10	–	0	–	1
No. 18 Florida	5	–	1	–	0	9	–	2	–	0
No. 9 Alabama	5	–	1	–	1	8	–	1	–	2
No. 13 Auburn	5	–	2	–	0	8	–	2	–	0
Tennessee	3	–	2	–	2	6	–	2	–	2
Georgia	4	–	3	–	0	6	–	4	–	0
Georgia Tech	4	–	4	–	0	5	–	5	–	0
LSU	2	–	3	–	1	5	–	4	–	1
Kentucky	2	–	4	–	1	5	–	4	–	1
Tulane	1	–	4	–	1	3	–	6	–	1
Mississippi State	0	–	5	–	1	2	–	6	–	1
Vanderbilt	0	–	7	–	0	3	–	7	–	0
$ – Conference champion; Rankings from AP Poll

The 1960 Tulane Green Wave football team was an American football team that represented Tulane University during the 1960 college football season as a member of the Southeastern Conference (SEC). In its seventh year under head coach Andy Pilney, Tulane compiled a 3–6–1 record (1–4–1 in conference games), finished tenth in the SEC, and was outscored by a total of 140 to 132.

The team gained an average of 168.4 rushing yards and 88.0 passing yards per game. On defense, it gave up an average of 136.5 rushing yards and 109.9 passing yards per game. Tulane's individual leaders included Phil Nugent with 873 passing yards and Tommy Mason with 662 rushing yards and 376 receiving yards.

The Green Wave played its home games at Tulane Stadium in New Orleans.

== Schedule ==
Date	Opponent	Site	Result	Attendance	Source
September 17	at California*	California Memorial Stadium; Berkeley, CA	W 7–3	37,500	
September 24	No. 5 Alabama	Tulane Stadium; New Orleans, LA	T 6–6	43,000	
October 1	at Rice*	Rice Stadium; Houston, TX	L 7–10	30,000	
October 15	No. 1 Ole Miss	Tulane Stadium; New Orleans, LA (rivalry)	L 13–26		
October 22	at Georgia Tech	Grant Field; Atlanta, GA	L 6–14	43,608	
October 29	William & Mary*	Tulane Stadium; New Orleans, LA	W 40–8	25,000	
November 5	at Texas Tech*	Jones Stadium; Lubbock, TX	L 21–35	15,000	
November 12	at No. 20 Florida	Florida Field; Gainesville, FL	L 6–21	44,000	
November 19	at Vanderbilt	Dudley Field; Nashville, TN	W 20–0	16,000	
November 26	LSU	Tulane Stadium; New Orleans, LA (Battle for the Rag)	L 6–17	74,000	
*Non-conference game; Rankings from AP Poll released prior to the game
