= 1960 Arkansas Razorbacks football team =

American college football season

1960 Arkansas Razorbacks football

SWC champion

Cotton Bowl Classic, L 6–7 vs. Duke
- Conference: Southwest Conference

Ranking
- Coaches: No. 7
- AP: No. 7
- Record: 8–3 (6–1 SWC)
- Head coach: Frank Broyles (3rd season)
- Captains: Steve Butler; Wayne Harris
- Home stadium: Razorback Stadium; War Memorial Stadium

1960 Southwest Conference football standings
	Conf.					Overall
Team	W		L		T	W		L		T
No. 7 Arkansas $	6	–	1	–	0	8	–	3	–	0
No. 12 Baylor	5	–	2	–	0	8	–	3	–	0
Texas	5	–	2	–	0	7	–	3	–	1
Rice	5	–	2	–	0	7	–	4	–	0
TCU	3	–	3	–	1	4	–	4	–	2
Texas Tech	1	–	5	–	1	3	–	6	–	1
Texas A&M	0	–	4	–	3	1	–	6	–	3
SMU	0	–	6	–	1	0	–	9	–	1
$ – Conference champion; Rankings from AP Poll

The 1960 Arkansas Razorbacks football team represented the University of Arkansas in the Southwest Conference (SWC) during the 1960 college football season. In their third year under head coach Frank Broyles, the Razorbacks compiled an 8–3 record (6–1 against SWC opponents), won the SWC championship, and outscored all opponents by a combined total of 185 to 87. The Razorbacks' only losses during the regular season came against Baylor by a 28–14 score and to Mississippi by a 10–7 score. The team was ranked No. 7 in both the final AP Poll and the final UPI Coaches Poll and went on to lose to Duke in the 1960 Cotton Bowl Classic by a 7–6 score.

Lineman Wayne Harris was selected by the Football Writers Association of America as a first-team player on the 1960 All-America Team. He was also honored as a second-team player by the UPI. Halfback Lance Alworth was recognized as a third-team All-American by the American Football Coaches Association.

== Schedule ==
Date	Opponent	Rank	Site	TV	Result	Attendance	Source
September 17	Oklahoma State*		War Memorial Stadium; Little Rock, AR		W 9–0	38,000	
September 24	Tulsa*		Razorback Stadium; Fayetteville, AR		W 48–7	25,000	
October 1	at TCU	No. 14	Amon G. Carter Stadium; Fort Worth, TX		W 7–0	38,000	
October 8	No. 20 Baylor	No. 9	Razorback Stadium; Fayetteville, AR		L 14–28	39,000	
October 15	at No. 11 Texas		Memorial Stadium; Austin, TX (rivalry)	ABC	W 24–23	35,000	
October 22	No. 2 Ole Miss*	No. 14	War Memorial Stadium; Little Rock, AR (rivalry)		L 7–10	40,000	
October 29	at Texas A&M	No. 12	Kyle Field; College Station, TX (rivalry)		W 7–3	19,500	
November 5	No. 10 Rice	No. 16	War Memorial Stadium; Little Rock, AR		W 3–0	40,000	
November 12	SMU	No. 9	Razorback Stadium; Fayetteville, AR		W 26–3	31,500	
November 19	Texas Tech	No. 7	Jones Stadium; Lubbock, TX (rivalry)		W 34–6	30,000	
January 2	vs. No. 10 Duke*	No. 7	Cotton Bowl; Dallas, TX (Cotton Bowl Classic)	CBS	L 6–7	74,000	
*Non-conference game; Rankings from AP Poll released prior to the game
