= 1960 Baylor Bears football team =

American college football season

1960 Baylor Bears football

Gator Bowl, L 12–13 vs. Florida
- Conference: Southwest Conference

Ranking
- Coaches: No. 11
- AP: No. 12
- Record: 8–3 (5–2 SWC)
- Head coach: John Bridgers (2nd season)
- Captains: Jim Evans; Ronald Stanley
- Home stadium: Baylor Stadium

1960 Southwest Conference football standings
	Conf.					Overall
Team	W		L		T	W		L		T
No. 7 Arkansas $	6	–	1	–	0	8	–	3	–	0
No. 12 Baylor	5	–	2	–	0	8	–	3	–	0
Texas	5	–	2	–	0	7	–	3	–	1
Rice	5	–	2	–	0	7	–	4	–	0
TCU	3	–	3	–	1	4	–	4	–	2
Texas Tech	1	–	5	–	1	3	–	6	–	1
Texas A&M	0	–	4	–	3	1	–	6	–	3
SMU	0	–	6	–	1	0	–	9	–	1
$ – Conference champion; Rankings from AP Poll

The 1960 Baylor Bears football team represented Baylor University during the 1960 college football season. The Bears were led by second-year head coach John Bridgers and played their home games at Baylor Stadium in Waco, Texas. They competed as members of the Southwest Conference, finishing in second and ranked 12th in the final AP Poll with a regular season record of 8–2 (5–2 SWC). They were invited to the 1960 Gator Bowl, where they lost to Florida, 12–13.

== Schedule ==
Date	Opponent	Rank	Site	TV	Result	Attendance	Source
September 24	Colorado*		Baylor Stadium; Waco, TX		W 26–0	29,000	
October 1	at LSU*		Tiger Stadium; Baton Rouge, LA		W 7–3	57,662	
October 8	at No. 9 Arkansas	No. 20	Razorback Stadium; Fayetteville, AR		W 28–14	39,000	
October 15	at Texas Tech	No. 7	Jones Stadium; Lubbock, TX (rivalry)		W 14–7	29,000	
October 22	Texas A&M^{†}	No. 7	Baylor Stadium; Waco, TX (rivalry)		W 14–0	40,000	
October 29	at TCU	No. 7	Amon G. Carter Stadium; Fort Worth, TX (rivalry)		L 6–14	35,000	
November 5	Texas	No. 11	Baylor Stadium; Waco, TX (rivalry)		L 7–12	50,000	
November 12	USC*		Baylor Stadium; Waco, TX		W 35–14	23,000	
November 19	at SMU		Cotton Bowl; Dallas, TX		W 20–7	23,000	
November 26	No. 12 Rice	No. 19	Baylor Stadium; Waco, TX		W 12–7	30,000	
December 31	vs. No. 18 Florida*	No. 12	Gator Bowl Stadium; Jacksonville, FL (Gator Bowl)	CBS	L 12–13	50,112	
*Non-conference game; ^{†}Homecoming; Rankings from AP Poll released prior to the game
