= 1960 Tennessee Volunteers football team =

American college football season

1960 Tennessee Volunteers football
- Conference: Southeastern Conference

Ranking
- Coaches: No. 19
- Record: 6–2–2 (3–2–2 SEC)
- Head coach: Bowden Wyatt (6th season)
- Home stadium: Shields–Watkins Field

1960 Southeastern Conference football standings
	Conf.					Overall
Team	W		L		T	W		L		T
No. 2 Ole Miss $	5	–	0	–	1	10	–	0	–	1
No. 18 Florida	5	–	1	–	0	9	–	2	–	0
No. 9 Alabama	5	–	1	–	1	8	–	1	–	2
No. 13 Auburn	5	–	2	–	0	8	–	2	–	0
Tennessee	3	–	2	–	2	6	–	2	–	2
Georgia	4	–	3	–	0	6	–	4	–	0
Georgia Tech	4	–	4	–	0	5	–	5	–	0
LSU	2	–	3	–	1	5	–	4	–	1
Kentucky	2	–	4	–	1	5	–	4	–	1
Tulane	1	–	4	–	1	3	–	6	–	1
Mississippi State	0	–	5	–	1	2	–	6	–	1
Vanderbilt	0	–	7	–	0	3	–	7	–	0
$ – Conference champion; Rankings from AP Poll

The 1960 Tennessee Volunteers (variously "Tennessee", "UT" or the "Vols") represented the University of Tennessee in the 1960 college football season. Playing as a member of the Southeastern Conference (SEC), the team was led by head coach Bowden Wyatt, in his sixth year, and played their home games at Shields–Watkins Field in Knoxville, Tennessee. They finished the season with a record of six wins, two losses and two ties (6–2–2 overall, 3–2–2 in the SEC).

== Schedule ==
Date	Opponent	Rank	Site	Result	Attendance	Source
September 24	at Auburn		Legion Field; Birmingham, AL (rivalry)	W 10–3	43,000	
October 1	vs. Mississippi State	No. 11	Crump Stadium; Memphis, TN	T 0–0	27,000	
October 8	Tampa*		Shields–Watkins Field; Knoxville, TN	W 62–7	19,945	
October 15	No. 15 Alabama		Shields–Watkins Field; Knoxville, TN (Third Saturday in October)	W 20–7	46,000	
October 22	No. 7 (small) Chattanooga*	No. 12	Shields–Watkins Field; Knoxville, TN	W 35–0	25,200	
October 29	North Carolina*	No. 11	Shields–Watkins Field; Knoxville, TN	W 27–14	27,060	
November 5	at Georgia Tech	No. 8	Grant Field; Atlanta, GA (rivalry)	L 7–14	45,072	
November 12	No. 4 Ole Miss^{†}	No. 14	Shields–Watkins Field; Knoxville, TN (rivalry)	L 3–24	45,100	
November 19	Kentucky		Shields–Watkins Field; Knoxville, TN (rivalry)	T 10–10	39,800	
November 26	at Vanderbilt		Dudley Field; Nashville, TN (rivalry)	W 35–0	34,000	
*Non-conference game; ^{†}Homecoming; Rankings from AP Poll released prior to the game

== Roster ==
- TB Billy Majors, Sr.

== Team players drafted into the NFL ==
Player	Position	Round	Pick	NFL club
Mike Lucci	Center	5	69	Cleveland Browns
Billy Majors	Back	12	168	Philadelphia Eagles
Charlie Baker	Tackle	20	279	Cleveland Browns
Lebron Shields	Tackle	Expansion draft		Minnesota Vikings
