= 1960 Auburn Tigers football team =

American college football season

1960 Auburn Tigers football
- Conference: Southeastern Conference

Ranking
- Coaches: No. 14
- AP: No. 13
- Record: 8–2 (5–2 SEC)
- Head coach: Ralph Jordan (10th season)
- Home stadium: Cliff Hare Stadium

1960 Southeastern Conference football standings
	Conf.					Overall
Team	W		L		T	W		L		T
No. 2 Ole Miss $	5	–	0	–	1	10	–	0	–	1
No. 18 Florida	5	–	1	–	0	9	–	2	–	0
No. 9 Alabama	5	–	1	–	1	8	–	1	–	2
No. 13 Auburn	5	–	2	–	0	8	–	2	–	0
Tennessee	3	–	2	–	2	6	–	2	–	2
Georgia	4	–	3	–	0	6	–	4	–	0
Georgia Tech	4	–	4	–	0	5	–	5	–	0
LSU	2	–	3	–	1	5	–	4	–	1
Kentucky	2	–	4	–	1	5	–	4	–	1
Tulane	1	–	4	–	1	3	–	6	–	1
Mississippi State	0	–	5	–	1	2	–	6	–	1
Vanderbilt	0	–	7	–	0	3	–	7	–	0
$ – Conference champion; Rankings from AP Poll

The 1960 Auburn Tigers football team represented Auburn University in the 1960 college football season. It was the Tigers' 69th overall and 27th season as a member of the Southeastern Conference (SEC). The team was led by head coach Ralph "Shug" Jordan, in his tenth year, and played their home games at Cliff Hare Stadium in Auburn and Legion Field in Birmingham, Alabama. They finished with a record of eight wins and two losses (8–2 overall, 5–2 in the SEC).

== Schedule ==
Date	Opponent	Rank	Site	Result	Attendance	Source
September 24	Tennessee		Legion Field; Birmingham, AL (rivalry)	L 3–10	43,000	
October 1	at Kentucky		McLean Stadium; Lexington, KY	W 10–7	33,000	
October 8	Chattanooga*		Cliff Hare Stadium; Auburn, AL	W 10–0	30,000	
October 15	No. 19 Georgia Tech		Legion Field; Birmingham, AL	W 9–7	44,000	
October 22	Miami (FL)*	No. 17	Cliff Hare Stadium; Auburn, AL	W 20–7	25,000	
October 29	at Florida	No. 14	Florida Field; Gainesville, FL (rivalry)	W 10–7	40,000	
November 5	Mississippi State^{†}	No. 12	Cliff Hare Stadium; Auburn, AL	W 27–12	38,000	
November 12	Georgia	No. 10	Cliff Hare Stadium; Auburn, AL (rivalry)	W 9–6	46,000	
November 19	Florida State*	No. 9	Cliff Hare Stadium; Auburn, AL	W 57–21	20,000	
November 26	vs. No. 17 Alabama	No. 8	Legion Field; Birmingham, AL (Iron Bowl)	L 0–3	46,000	
*Non-conference game; ^{†}Homecoming; Rankings from AP Poll released prior to the game
