= 1960 Georgia Tech Yellow Jackets football team =

American college football season

1960 Georgia Tech Yellow Jackets football
- Conference: Southeastern Conference
- Record: 5–5 (4–4 SEC)
- Head coach: Bobby Dodd (16th season)
- Home stadium: Grant Field

1960 Southeastern Conference football standings
	Conf.					Overall
Team	W		L		T	W		L		T
No. 2 Ole Miss $	5	–	0	–	1	10	–	0	–	1
No. 18 Florida	5	–	1	–	0	9	–	2	–	0
No. 9 Alabama	5	–	1	–	1	8	–	1	–	2
No. 13 Auburn	5	–	2	–	0	8	–	2	–	0
Tennessee	3	–	2	–	2	6	–	2	–	2
Georgia	4	–	3	–	0	6	–	4	–	0
Georgia Tech	4	–	4	–	0	5	–	5	–	0
LSU	2	–	3	–	1	5	–	4	–	1
Kentucky	2	–	4	–	1	5	–	4	–	1
Tulane	1	–	4	–	1	3	–	6	–	1
Mississippi State	0	–	5	–	1	2	–	6	–	1
Vanderbilt	0	–	7	–	0	3	–	7	–	0
$ – Conference champion; Rankings from AP Poll

The 1960 Georgia Tech Yellow Jackets football team represented the Georgia Institute of Technology during the 1960 college football season. The Yellow Jackets were led by 16th-year head coach Bobby Dodd, and played their home games at Grant Field in Atlanta.

After a quick jump to No. 10 in the AP poll after their first two victories, the Yellow Jackets fell on the wrong side of several close games, finishing the year with a disappointing 5–5 record. The average margin of defeat in their five losses was only 2.2 points, and all were one-score games. Their first loss was to a Florida Gators team that featured Bobby Dodd's son, Robert Jr., at quarterback.

== Schedule ==
Date	Opponent	Rank	Site	Result	Attendance	Source
September 17	Kentucky		Grant Field; Atlanta, GA	W 23–13	40,594	
September 24	at Rice*	No. 13	Rice Stadium; Houston, TX	W 16–13	35,000	
October 1	at Florida	No. 10	Florida Field; Gainesville, FL	L 17–18	39,000	
October 8	LSU		Grant Field; Atlanta, GA	W 6–2	44,176	
October 15	at Auburn	No. 19	Legion Field; Birmingham, AL (rivalry)	L 7–9	44,000	
October 22	Tulane^{†}		Grant Field; Atlanta, GA	W 14–6	43,608	
October 29	at No. 15 Duke*		Duke Stadium; Durham, NC	L 0–6	40,000	
November 5	No. 8 Tennessee		Grant Field; Atlanta, GA (rivalry)	W 14–7	45,072	
November 12	Alabama		Grant Field; Atlanta, GA (rivalry)	L 15–16	44,006	
November 26	at Georgia		Sanford Stadium; Athens, GA (rivalry)	L 6–7	55,000	
*Non-conference game; ^{†}Homecoming; Rankings from AP Poll released prior to the game
