= 1960 Texas A&M Aggies football team =

American college football season

1960 Texas A&M Aggies football
- Conference: Southwest Conference
- Record: 1–6–3 (0–4–3 SWC)
- Head coach: Jim Myers (3rd season)
- Home stadium: Kyle Field

1960 Southwest Conference football standings
	Conf.					Overall
Team	W		L		T	W		L		T
No. 7 Arkansas $	6	–	1	–	0	8	–	3	–	0
No. 12 Baylor	5	–	2	–	0	8	–	3	–	0
Texas	5	–	2	–	0	7	–	3	–	1
Rice	5	–	2	–	0	7	–	4	–	0
TCU	3	–	3	–	1	4	–	4	–	2
Texas Tech	1	–	5	–	1	3	–	6	–	1
Texas A&M	0	–	4	–	3	1	–	6	–	3
SMU	0	–	6	–	1	0	–	9	–	1
$ – Conference champion; Rankings from AP Poll

The 1960 Texas A&M Aggies football team represented Texas A&M University in the 1960 college football season as a member of the Southwest Conference (SWC). The Aggies were led by head coach Jim Myers in his third season and finished with a record of one win, six losses and three ties (1–6–3 overall, 0–4–3 in the SWC).

== Schedule ==
Date	Opponent	Site	Result	Attendance	Source
September 17	at LSU*	Tiger Stadium; Baton Rouge, LA (rivalry)	L 0–9	64,000	
September 24	Texas Tech	Kyle Field; College Station, TX (rivalry)	T 14–14	13,000	
October 1	at Trinity (TX)*	Alamo Stadium; San Antonio, TX	W 14–0	15,181	
October 8	at Houston*	Rice Stadium; Houston, TX	L 0–17	42,000	
October 15	TCU	Kyle Field; College Station, TX (rivalry)	T 14–14	16,000	
October 22	at No. 7 Baylor	Baylor Stadium; Waco, TX (rivalry)	L 0–14	40,000	
October 29	No. 12 Arkansas	Kyle Field; College Station, TX (rivalry)	L 3–7	19,500	
November 5	at SMU	Cotton Bowl; Dallas, TX	T 0–0	35,000	
November 12	at No. 16 Rice	Rice Stadium; Houston, TX	L 14–21	50,000	
November 24	at Texas	Memorial Stadium; Austin, TX (rivalry)	L 14–21	53,000	
*Non-conference game; Rankings from AP Poll released prior to the game
