= 1960 Florida Gators football team =

American college football season

1960 Florida Gators football

Gator Bowl, W 13–12 vs. Baylor
- Conference: Southeastern Conference

Ranking
- Coaches: No. 16
- AP: No. 18
- Record: 9–2 (5–1 SEC)
- Head coach: Ray Graves (1st season)
- Offensive coordinator: Pepper Rodgers (1st season)
- Home stadium: Florida Field

1960 Southeastern Conference football standings
	Conf.					Overall
Team	W		L		T	W		L		T
No. 2 Ole Miss $	5	–	0	–	1	10	–	0	–	1
No. 18 Florida	5	–	1	–	0	9	–	2	–	0
No. 9 Alabama	5	–	1	–	1	8	–	1	–	2
No. 13 Auburn	5	–	2	–	0	8	–	2	–	0
Tennessee	3	–	2	–	2	6	–	2	–	2
Georgia	4	–	3	–	0	6	–	4	–	0
Georgia Tech	4	–	4	–	0	5	–	5	–	0
LSU	2	–	3	–	1	5	–	4	–	1
Kentucky	2	–	4	–	1	5	–	4	–	1
Tulane	1	–	4	–	1	3	–	6	–	1
Mississippi State	0	–	5	–	1	2	–	6	–	1
Vanderbilt	0	–	7	–	0	3	–	7	–	0
$ – Conference champion; Rankings from AP Poll

The 1960 Florida Gators football team represented the University of Florida during the 1960 college football season. The season was Ray Graves' first of ten and one of his three most successful as the head coach of the Florida Gators football team. Graves' 1960 Florida Gators finished with a 9–2 overall record a 5–1 record in the Southeastern Conference (SEC), placing second among the twelve SEC teams—their best-ever SEC finish to date.

== Schedule ==
Date	Opponent	Rank	Site	TV	Result	Attendance	Source
September 17	vs. George Washington*		Gator Bowl Stadium; Jacksonville, FL		W 30–7	17,000	
September 24	Florida State*		Florida Field; Gainesville, FL (rivalry)		W 3–0	38,000	
October 1	No. 10 Georgia Tech		Florida Field; Gainesville, FL		W 18–17	39,000	
October 8	vs. Rice*	No. 18	Miami Orange Bowl; Miami, FL		L 0–10	17,535	
October 15	Vanderbilt		Florida Field; Gainesville, FL		W 12–0	31,000	
October 22	at Louisiana State		Tiger Stadium; Baton Rouge, LA (rivalry)		W 13–10	47,000	
October 29	No. 14 Auburn		Florida Field; Gainesville, FL (rivalry)		L 7–10	40,000	
November 5	vs. Georgia		Gator Bowl Stadium; Jacksonville, FL (rivalry)		W 22–14	48,622	
November 12	Tulane^{†}	No. 20	Florida Field; Gainesville, FL		W 21–6	44,000	
November 26	at Miami (FL)*	No. 19	Miami Orange Bowl; Miami, FL (rivalry)		W 18–0	60,122	
December 31	vs. No. 12 Baylor*		Gator Bowl Stadium; Jacksonville, FL (Gator Bowl)	CBS	W 13–12	50,112	
*Non-conference game; ^{†}Homecoming; Rankings from AP Poll released prior to the game

== Before the season ==
Graves was a former Tennessee Volunteers lineman and assistant under coach Robert Neyland, and became a long-time Georgia Tech Yellow Jackets defensive assistant for coach Bobby Dodd. Graves' arrival in Gainesville heralded a change in the Gators' football outlook: no longer would the Gators espouse Bob Woodruff's conservative, ball control, "go for the tie" philosophy.

== During the season ==
Days before their second game of the season would officially begin, a gambler named Aaron Wagman and a University of Florida student named Phil Silber were arrested due to an attempted bribe at fullback Jon MacBeth before their season-opening game against their in-state college rivals in Florida State University began. These arrests would help lead to the full discovery of what eventually was called the 1961 NCAA University Division men's basketball gambling scandal, led by former NBA All-Star Jack Molinas. That game would later be played without a hitch, though MacBeth would help later testify in court in order to maintain his innocence throughout the situation.

== Postseason ==
The Gators capped their first-ever nine-win season with a hard-fought 13–12 victory over the twelfth-ranked Baylor Bears in the Gator Bowl on New Year's Eve 1960. In the Gator Bowl, the Gators defense halted a 75-yard drive by Baylor on the half-yard line in the first quarter, then set the stage for two second quarter touchdowns. Baylor dropped a pass for the two-point conversion and the win, and quarterback Libertore was voted game MVP.
