= List of Louisiana Ragin' Cajuns head football coaches =

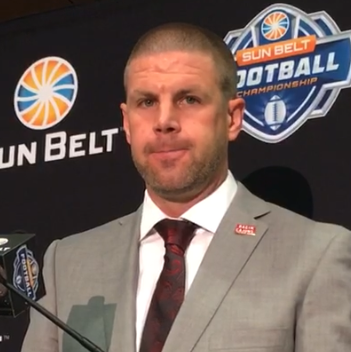
Billy Napier served as head coach at Louisiana from 2018 to 2021.

The Louisiana Ragin' Cajuns college football team represents the University of Louisiana at Lafayette in the Sun Belt Conference. The Ragin' Cajuns compete as part of the NCAA Division I Football Bowl Subdivision. The program has had 27 head coaches since it began play during the 1901 season. Since December 2021, Michael Desormeaux has served as head coach at Louisiana.

Five coaches have led Louisiana in postseason bowl games: Louis Whitman, Russ Faulkinberry, Mark Hudspeth, Billy Napier, and Desormeaux. Seven coaches have won conference championships: Johnny Cain and Louis Whitman each captured one as a member of the Louisiana Intercollegiate Conference; Faulkinberry captured three and Raymond Didier one as a member of the Gulf States Conference; Nelson Stokley captured two as a member of the Big West Conference; and Napier captured two and Rickey Bustle one as a member of the Sun Belt Conference.

Faulkinberry and Stokley are the leaders in seasons coached with 13 years as head coach. Faulkinberry is the leader in overall wins with 66, and Napier has the highest winning percentage of those who coached more than three games at 0.769. Jerry Baldwin has the lowest winning percentage at 0.182. Of the 27 different head coaches who have led the Cajuns, Cain has been inducted into the College Football Hall of Fame.

== Key ==
Key to symbols in coaches list
General		Overall		Conference		Postseason (Note: Although the first Rose Bowl Game was played in 1902, it has been continuously played since the 1916 game, and is recognized as the oldest bowl game by the NCAA. "—" indicates any season prior to 1916 when postseason games were not played.)	
No.	Order of coaches (Note: A running total of the number of head coaches, with coaches who served separate tenures being counted only once. Interim head coaches are represented with "Int" and are not counted in the running total. "—" indicates the team played but either without a coach or no coach is on record. "X" indicates an interim year without play.)	GC	Games coached	CW	Conference wins	PW	Postseason wins
DC	Division championships	OW	Overall wins	CL	Conference losses	PL	Postseason losses
CC	Conference championships	OL	Overall losses	CT	Conference ties	PT	Postseason ties
NC	National championships	OT	Overall ties (Note: Overtime rules in college football were introduced in 1996, making ties impossible in the period since.)	C%	Conference winning percentage		
†	Elected to the College Football Hall of Fame	O%	Overall winning percentage (Note: When computing the win–loss percentage, a tie counts as half a win and half a loss.)				

== Coaches ==
List of head football coaches showing season(s) coached, overall records, conference records, postseason records, championships and selected awards (Note: Statistics correct as of the end of the 2025 NCAA Division I FCS football season.)
No.	Name	Season(s) (Note: Louisiana did not field a team for the 1905 season.)	GC	OW	OL	OT	O%	CW	CL	CT	C%	PW	PL	PT	CC	NC	Awards
1	Ashby Woodson	1901–1902	5	3	2	0	0.600	—	—	—	—	—	—	—	—	—	—
2	J. Ovey Herpin	1903	2	1	1	0	0.500	—	—	—	—	—	—	—	—	—	—
3	Edwin F. Gayle	1904	3	2	0	1	0.833	—	—	—	—	—	—	—	—	—	—
4	Herbert McNaspy	1906	2	1	0	1	0.750	—	—	—	—	—	—	—	—	—	—
5	Jefferson Caffery	1907	1	1	0	0	1.000	—	—	—	—	—	—	—	—	—	—
6; 8; 11	Clement J. McNaspy	1908–1911; 1913; 1917–1918	53	34	15	4	0.679	—	—	—	—	—	—	—	—	—	—
7	H. Lee Prather	1912	7	3	4	0	0.429	—	—	—	—	—	—	—	—	—	—
9	Richard B. Dunbar	1914–1915	16	10	5	1	0.656	—	—	—	—	—	—	—	—	—	—
10; 12; 14	T. R. Mobley	1916; 1919; 1921–1930	111	56	48	7	0.536	16	23	0	0.410	—	—	—	0	—	—
13	Herbert O. Tudor	1920	10	2	8	0	0.200	—	—	—	—	—	—	—	—	—	—
15	Truman F. Wilbanks	1931–1936	53	19	32	2	0.377	8	20	1	0.293	—	—	—	0	—	—
16; 18	Johnny Cain^{†}	1937–1941; 1946	57	33	19	5	0.623	18	11	3	0.609	—	—	—	1	—	—
17	Louis Whitman	1942–1945	30	14	14	2	0.500	6	4	1	0.591	1	0	0	1	—	—
19	Gee Mitchell	1947–1949	27	18	8	1	0.685	10	5	0	0.667	0	0	0	0	—	—
20	A. L. Swanson	1950	9	5	4	0	0.556	2	3	0	0.400	0	0	0	0	—	—
21	Raymond Didier	1951–1956	58	29	27	2	0.517	16	15	2	0.515	0	0	0	1	—	—
22	John Robert Bell	1957	10	4	5	1	0.450	1	3	1	0.300	0	0	0	0	—	—
23	Red Hoggatt	1958–1960	28	11	17	0	0.393	5	10	0	0.333	0	0	0	0	—	—
24	Russ Faulkinberry	1961–1973	131	66	63	2	0.511	30	34	1	0.469	0	1	0	3	—	—
25	Augie Tammariello	1974–1979	67	30	35	2	0.463	11	17	2	0.400	0	0	0	0	—	—
26	Sam Robertson	1980–1985	65	29	34	2	0.462	4	5	1	0.450	0	0	0	0	—	—
27	Nelson Stokley	1986–1998	143	62	80	1	0.437	14	4	0	0.778	0	0	0	2	—	—
28	Jerry Baldwin	1999–2001	33	6	27	—	0.182	2	4	—	0.333	0	0	—	0	—	—
29	Rickey Bustle	2002–2010	106	41	65	—	0.387	30	32	—	0.484	0	0	—	1	—	—
30	Mark Hudspeth (Note: Louisiana vacated 22 wins from 2011 to 2014, including the 2011 and 2013 New Orleans Bowls and 2013 Sun Belt Conference co-championship, due to NCAA violations involving a former assistant. Without the vacated wins, Louisiana went 9–4 in each season between 2011 and 2014.)	2011–2017	67	29	38	—	0.433	22	19	—	0.537	2	1	—	0	—	—
31	Billy Napier	2018–2021	52	40	12	—	0.769	27	5	—	0.844	2	1	—	2	—	—
32	Michael Desormeaux	2021–present	54	29	25	—	0.537	19	13	—	0.594	1	4	—	0	—	—
