= 1945 Southwestern Louisiana Bulldogs football team =

American college football season

1945 Southwestern Louisiana Bulldogs football
- Conference: Louisiana Intercollegiate Conference
- Record: 1–6–1 (1–2–1 LIC)
- Head coach: Louis Whitman (4th season)
- Home stadium: McNaspy Stadium

The 1945 Southwestern Louisiana Bulldogs football team was an American football team that represented the Southwestern Louisiana Institute of Liberal and Technical Learning (now known as the University of Louisiana at Lafayette) in the Louisiana Intercollegiate Conference during the 1945 college football season. In their fourth year under head coach Louis Whitman, the team compiled a 1–6–1 record.

== Schedule ==
The Bulldogs were also scheduled to play Millsaps on October 13 and a second game against the Lake Charles AAF on November 3, but both were canceled.

Date	Opponent	Site	Result	Attendance	Source
September 22	Lake Charles AAF*	McNaspy Stadium; Lafayette, LA	L 7–21		
September 29	at Mississippi State*	Scott Field; Starkville, MS	L 0–31	4,000	
October 5	Louisiana Tech	McNaspy Stadium; Lafayette, LA (rivalry)	L 12–14		
October 20	at Northwestern State	Demon Stadium; Natchitoches, LA	T 0–0		
October 27	at Florida*	Florida Field; Gainesville, FL	L 0–45		
November 10	at Auburn*	Cramton Bowl; Montgomery, AL	L 0–52	3,500	
November 17	at Louisiana Tech	Tech Stadium; Ruston, LA (rivalry)	W 13–7		
November 22	Northwestern State	McNaspy Stadium; Lafayette, LA	L 0–13		
*Non-conference game
