= 1944 Louisiana Tech Bulldogs football team =

American college football season

1944 Louisiana Tech Bulldogs football
- Conference: Louisiana Intercollegiate Conference
- Record: 3–5–1 (2–1–1 LIC)
- Head coach: Joe Aillet (4th season)
- Captain: Johnny Bibb
- Home stadium: Tech Stadium

The 1944 Louisiana Tech Bulldogs football team was an American football team that represented the Louisiana Polytechnic Institute (now known as Louisiana Tech University) as a member of the Louisiana Intercollegiate Conference during the 1944 college football season. In their fourth year under head coach Joe Aillet, the team compiled a 3–5–1 record.

== Schedule ==
Date	Time	Opponent	Site	Result	Attendance	Source
September 23		Southwestern (TX)*	Tech Stadium; Ruston, LA	L 0–26	3,500	
September 30		Selman Field*	Tech Stadium; Ruston, LA	L 6–13		
October 6		Marine OCS (LA)*	Tech Stadium; Ruston, LA	W 72–0		
October 14		Southwestern Louisiana	Tech Stadium; Ruston, LA (rivalry)	L 0–15		
October 20	8:00 p.m.	Fourth Infantry*	Tech Stadium; Ruston, LA	L 0–33		
October 28		at Louisiana Normal	Demon Field; Natchitoches, LA (rivalry)	W 21–7		
November 4		Arkansas A&M*	Tech Stadium; Ruston, LA	L 14–20		
November 11		Louisiana Normal	Tech Stadium; Ruston, LA	T 0–0		
November 18		at Southwestern Louisiana	McNaspy Stadium; Lafayette, LA	W 7–0		
*Non-conference game; All times are in Central time
