= Joe Aillet =

American football coach (1904–1971)

Biographical details
- Born: September 13, 1904; New York City, U.S.
- Died: December 28, 1971 (aged 67); Ruston, Louisiana, U.S.

Coaching career (HC unless noted)

Football
- 1926: Southwestern LA (SA)
- 1927–1935: Haynesville HS (LA)
- 1936–1939: Louisiana Normal (backfeld)
- 1940–1966: Louisiana Tech

Basketball
- 1926–1927: Southwestern LA (SA)
- 1944–1945: Louisiana Tech

Administrative career (AD unless noted)
- 1940–1970: Louisiana Tech

Head coaching record
- Overall: 151–86–8 (college football); 5–12 (college basketball)

Accomplishments and honors

Championships
- Football; 3 Louisiana Intercollegiate (1941, 1945, 1947); 9 Gulf States (1949, 1952–1953, 1955, 1957–1960, 1964)

Awards
- Football; 4× Gulf States Coach of the Year General; Louisiana Tech Athletic Hall of Fame (1984); Louisiana Sports Hall of Fame; Holy Cross School Sports Hall of Fame (2018)
- College Football Hall of Fame; Inducted in 1989 (profile)

Joseph Roguet Aillet (born Joseph Fuourka, September 13, 1904 – December 28, 1971) was an American football and basketball coach and college athletics administrator. He served as the head football coach at Louisiana Tech University from 1940 to 1966, compiling a record of 151–86–8. Additionally, under Aillet, the Bulldogs won nine conference championships. He was inducted into the College Football Hall of Fame in 1989. Joe Aillet Stadium, the home of the Louisiana Tech football team, was dedicated in Aillet's honor in 1972.

== Early life and education ==
=== Childhood ===
Aillet was brought in 1905 from the New York Foundling in New York City to Opelousas in St. Landry Parish, Louisiana, on an Orphan Train. Upon arriving at Youngsville on the orphan train, Father Johanni Roguet, the priest at St. Ann's Catholic Church, claimed the child. Since the priest could not legally adopt a child, he handed over the responsibilities of raising the baby to a widow named Eliza Aillet. From these two individuals, Joseph Fuourka was renamed Joseph Roguet Aillet.

=== Education ===
Aillet entered Holy Cross High School in New Orleans as a boarding student in sixth grade. During his high school years he played football, basketball, baseball, and track. He was also a member of the Dramatics Club and served as vice-pIresident of the Class of 1923 and held leadership positions in nearly every school society. After graduating in 1923 he attended St. Edward's University in Austin, Texas. While at St. Edward's, Aillet played quarterback and participated in all other sports under coach Jack Meagher. He joined the coaching staff at Southwestern Louisiana Institute (now University of Louisiana at Lafayette) while he completed his work on a bachelor's degree in 1927. He then worked at Haynesville High School for nine years while he completed his master's degree from Louisiana State University.

== Coaching ==
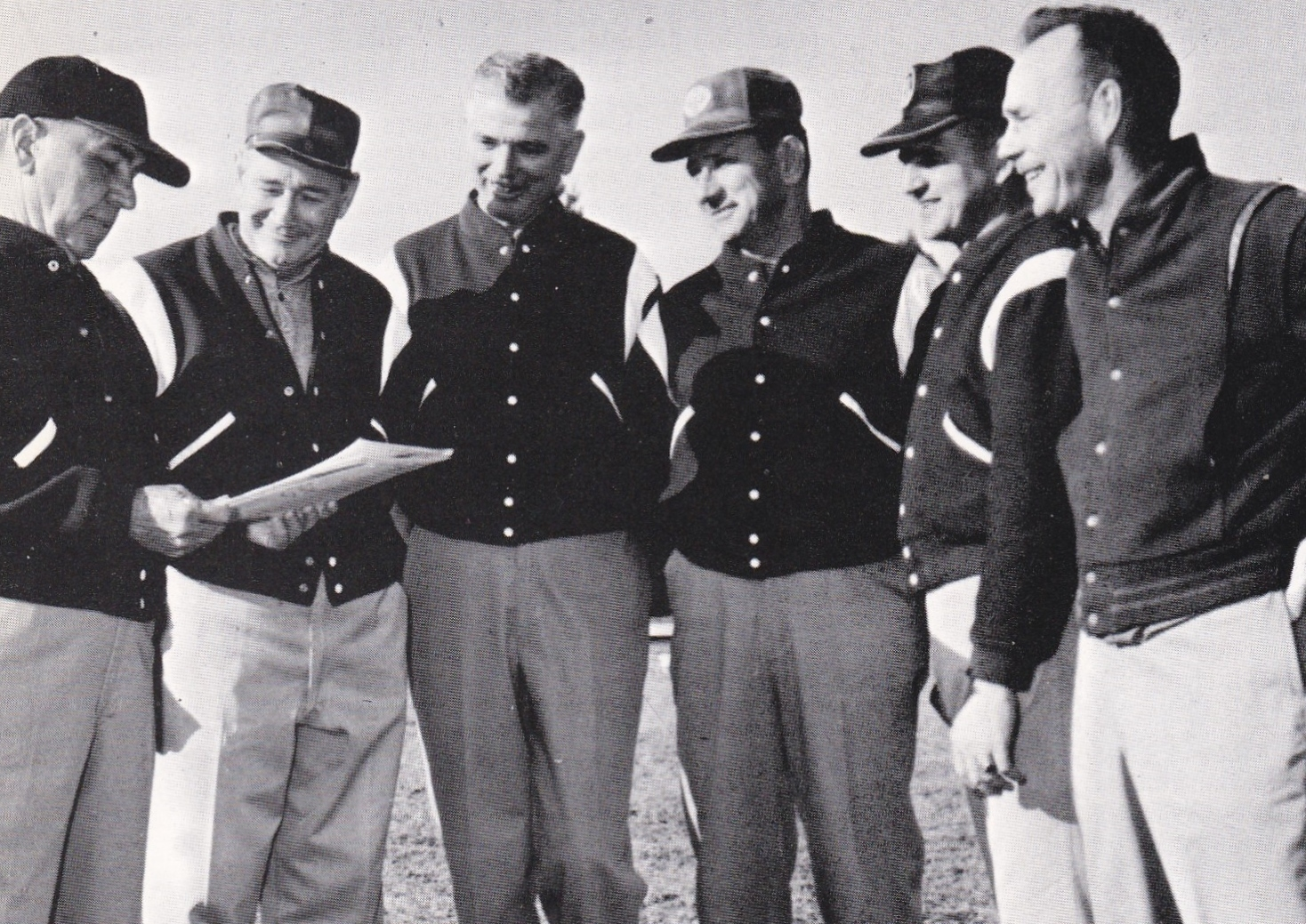
1966 Louisiana Tech University football coaches: from left, head coach Joe Aillet and assistants George Doherty, Jim Mize, A. Huey Williamson, E. J. Lewis, and Lee Hedges.

On the high school level, Aillet's teams at Haynesville won three championships during his 1927 to 1935 tenure. He was the first president of the Louisiana High School Coaches Association.

Aillet was backfield coach at Louisiana Normal for four years.

In addition to his success as a college football coach, Aillet obtained great success as the coach for the Louisiana Tech golf team. From 1952 to 1968, Louisiana Tech's golf team won the Gulf States Conference title 10 times in 15 seasons under Aillet.

== Administration ==
Aillet was the first president of the Gulf States Conference. From 1940 to 1970, he was Louisiana Tech's athletic director.

== Death ==
On December 28, 1971, Aillet died of cancer at age 67.

== Recognition ==
Statue of young Aillet in Concordia, Kansas, commemorating his journey on an Orphan Train.

Aillet is a member of the Louisiana Tech Athletic Hall of Fame, Louisiana Sports Hall of Fame, Holy Cross School Hall of Fame, College Football Hall of Fame, and the NAIA Hall of Fame.

== Head coaching record ==
=== Football ===
Year	Team	Overall	Conference	Standing	Bowl/playoffs	Coaches^{#}	AP^{°}
Louisiana Tech Bulldogs (Louisiana Intercollegiate Conference / Southern Intercollegiate Athletic Association) (1940–1947)
1940	Louisiana Tech	6–4	3–2 / 3–2	3rd / T–14th			
1941	Louisiana Tech	5–4–1	5–0 / 5–1	1st / 5th			
Louisiana Tech Bulldogs (Louisiana Intercollegiate Conference) (1942–1947)
1942	Louisiana Tech	6–3	1–2	3rd			
1943	No team—World War II						
1944	Louisiana Tech	3–5–1	2–1–1				
1945	Louisiana Tech	6–4	3–1	1st			
1946	Louisiana Tech	7–3	3–1	2nd			
1947	Louisiana Tech	5–4	5–0	1st			
Louisiana Tech Bulldogs (Gulf States Conference) (1948–1966)
1948	Louisiana Tech	7–2–1	4–1	2nd			
1949	Louisiana Tech	7–2	5–0	1st			
1950	Louisiana Tech	5–4–1	3–2	2nd			
1951	Louisiana Tech	4–5	2–3	4th			
1952	Louisiana Tech	6–1–2	3–0–2	T–1st			
1953	Louisiana Tech	6–3	5–1	T–1st			
1954	Louisiana Tech	6–3	4–2	T–2nd			
1955	Louisiana Tech	9–1	6–0	1st			
1956	Louisiana Tech	4–3–2	3–1–1	T–2nd			
1957	Louisiana Tech	6–4	4–1	T–1st			
1958	Louisiana Tech	7–3	4–1	T–1st			
1959	Louisiana Tech	9–1	5–0	1st		8	
1960	Louisiana Tech	8–2	4–1	T–1st		6	7
1961	Louisiana Tech	5–4	3–2	T–3rd			
1962	Louisiana Tech	4–4	2–3	T–4th			
1963	Louisiana Tech	6–3	3–2	T–2nd			
1964	Louisiana Tech	9–1	5–0	1st		6	4
1965	Louisiana Tech	4–4	3–2	3rd			
1966	Louisiana Tech	1–9	1–4	T–5th			
Louisiana Tech:		151–86–8	92–34–4				
Total:		151–86–8					
National championship Conference title Conference division title or championship game berth
