= Louis Whitman =

American football player and coach (1900–1979)

Biographical details
- Born: February 3, 1900; Logan County, Arkansas, U.S.
- Died: January 27, 1979 (aged 78); Lafayette Parish, Louisiana, U.S.

Playing career
- 1925–1927: Wyoming

Coaching career (HC unless noted)
- 1928–1941: Lafayette HS (LA)
- 1942–1945: Southwestern Louisiana

Head coaching record
- Overall: 14–14–2 (college)

Accomplishments and honors

Championships
- 1 LIC (1944)

Louis "Louey" Whitman (February 3, 1900 – January 27, 1979) was an American football coach. He served as the head football coach at Lafayette High School from 1928 to 1941 and at the Southwestern Louisiana Institute of Liberal and Technical Learning (now known as the University of Louisiana at Lafayette) from 1942 to 1945 compiling career college football coaching record of 14–14–2.

A native of Logan County, Arkansas, Whitman was a letterman while playing for the Wyoming football team during their 1925, 1926, and 1927 seasons. He next served as head coach of Lafayette High School from 1928 to 1941. Whitman was hired as head coach of Southwestern Louisiana prior to their 1942 season after head coach Johnny Cain and lead assistant Gee Mitchell took leaves of absence to serve in the military during World War II.

== Head coaching record ==
=== College ===
Year	Team	Overall	Conference	Standing	Bowl/playoffs
Southwestern Louisiana Bulldogs (Louisiana Intercollegiate Conference) (1942–1945)
1942	Southwestern Louisiana	3–4	2–1	2nd	
1943	Southwestern Louisiana	5–0–1	0–0		W Oil Bowl
1944	Southwestern Louisiana	5–4	3–1		
1945	Southwestern Louisiana	1–6–1	1–2–1		
Southwestern Louisiana:		14–14–2	6–4–1		
Total:		14–14–2			
National championship Conference title Conference division title or championship game berth
