= Gene Augusterfer =

American football player and coach (1913–1957)

Profile
- Positions: Fullback, defensive back

Personal information
- Born: October 4, 1913; Washington, D.C., U.S.
- Died: January 15, 1957 (aged 43); Washington, D.C., U.S.
- Listed height: 5 ft 9 in (1.75 m)
- Listed weight: 180 lb (82 kg)

Career information
- High school: St. John's College (Washington, D.C.)
- College: Catholic University

Career history

Playing
- Pittsburgh Pirates (1935)

Coaching
- Arkansas A&M (1943–1944) (head coach); Catholic University (1947) (head coach)

Career statistics
- Games: 1
- Stats at Pro Football Reference

Eugene Francis Augusterfer (October 4, 1913 – January 15, 1957) was an American football player and coach. He played professionally as a fullback and defensive back for the Pittsburgh Pirates of the National Football League (NFL) in 1935. Augusterfer served as head football coach at Arkansas Agricultural and Mechanical College—now known as the University of Arkansas at Monticello—from 1943 to 1944 and at his alma mater, Catholic University, in 1947. Augusterfer died on January 15, 1957, following a year-long illness. He was buried at Arlington National Cemetery.

== Head coaching record ==
=== Football ===
Year	Team	Overall	Conference	Standing	Bowl/playoffs
Arkansas A&M Boll Weevils (Arkansas Intercollegiate Conference) (1943–1944)
1943	Arkansas A&M	5–2–1			L Oil
1944	Arkansas A&M	7–2			
Arkansas A&M:		14–4–1			
Catholic University Cardinals (Independent) (1947)
1947	Catholic University	3–3			
Catholic University:		3–3			
Total:		17–7–1			
