= 1942 Louisiana Tech Bulldogs football team =

American college football season

1942 Louisiana Tech Bulldogs football
- Conference: Louisiana Intercollegiate Conference
- Record: 6–3 (1–2 LIC)
- Head coach: Joe Aillet (3rd season)
- Captain: Johnny Perritt
- Home stadium: Tech Stadium

1942 Louisiana Intercollegiate Conference football standings
	Conf.					Overall
Team	W		L		T	W		L		T
Louisiana Normal $	3	–	0	–	0	6	–	2	–	0
Southwestern Louisiana	2	–	1	–	0	3	–	4	–	0
Louisiana Tech	1	–	2	–	0	6	–	3	–	0
Southeastern Louisiana	0	–	3	–	0	5	–	5	–	0
$ – Conference champion

The 1942 Louisiana Tech Bulldogs football team was an American football team that represented the Louisiana Polytechnic Institute (now known as Louisiana Tech University) as a member of the Louisiana Intercollegiate Conference during the 1942 college football season. In their third year under head coach Joe Aillet, the team compiled a 6–3 record.

Louisiana Tech was ranked at No. 116 (out of 590 college and military teams) in the final rankings under the Litkenhous Difference by Score System for 1942.

== Schedule ==
Date	Opponent	Site	Result	Attendance	Source
September 25	Texas Mines*	Tech Stadium; Ruston, LA	W 20–0		
October 3	Waco Army Flying School*	State Fair Stadium; Shreveport, LA	W 45–0	2,000	
October 9	Marshall*	Tech Stadium; Ruston, LA	W 26–0		
October 16	Sam Houston State*	Tech Stadium; Ruston, LA	W 46–0		
October 24	vs. Louisiana Normal	State Fair Stadium; Shreveport, LA (rivalry)	L 6–10		
October 30	at Southwestern Louisiana	McNaspy Stadium; Lafayette, LA (rivalry)	L 7–12		
November 7	Southeastern Louisiana^{†}	Tech Stadium; Ruston, LA	W 56–14		
November 14	at Hardin–Simmons*	Hardin–Simmons Stadium; Abilene, TX	L 13–47		
November 21	at Memphis State*	Crump Stadium; Memphis, TN	W 33–7		
*Non-conference game; ^{†}Homecoming
