= 1943 Southwestern Louisiana Bulldogs football team =

American college football season

1943 Southwestern Louisiana Bulldogs football

Oil Bowl, W 24–7 vs. Arkansas A&M
- Conference: Louisiana Intercollegiate Conference
- Record: 5–0–1 (0–0 LIC)
- Head coach: Louis Whitman (2nd season)
- Home stadium: McNaspy Stadium

The 1943 Southwestern Louisiana Bulldogs football team was an American football team that represented the Southwestern Louisiana Institute of Liberal and Technical Learning (now known as the University of Louisiana at Lafayette) as a member the Louisiana Intercollegiate Conference during the 1943 college football season. The Louisiana Intercollegiate Conference has no league play in 1943 because of World War II. Led by second-year head coach Louis Whitman, the Bulldogs compiled a record of 5–0–1, and outscored their opponents 172 to 40. In the Oil Bowl, Southwestern Louisiana defeated Arkansas A&M on a muddy field, a team that had tied them 20–20 earlier in the season. The Bulldogs played their home games at McNaspy Stadium in Lafayette, Louisiana.

In the final Litkenhous Ratings, Southwestern ranked 12th among the nation's college and service teams with a rating of 104.3.

== Schedule ==
Date	Time	Opponent	Rank	Site	Result	Attendance	Source
October 15	8:00 p.m.	176th Infantry*		McNaspy Stadium; Lafayette, LA	W 20–7		
October 23		vs. No. 11 Southwestern (TX)*		Rice Stadium; Houston, TX	W 27–6	20,000	
November 6	2:30 p.m.	vs. No. T–17 Arkansas A&M*	No. 15	Crump Stadium; Memphis, TN	T 20–20	2,000	
November 13		Lake Charles Army Air Field*		McNapsy Stadium; Lafayette, LA	W 75–0		
November 27		at No. 18 Randolph Field*		Alamo Stadium; San Antonio, TX	W 6–0	5,000	
January 1, 1944	1:30 p.m.	vs. Arkansas A&M*		Rice Field; Houston, TX (Oil Bowl)	W 24–7	12,000	
*Non-conference game; Rankings from AP Poll released prior to the game; All times are in Central time

== Rankings ==
Ranking movements Legend: ██ Increase in ranking ██ Decrease in ranking — = Not ranked
	Week								
Poll	1	2	3	4	5	6	7	8	Final
AP	—	—	—	14	15	—	—	—	—
