= 1942 Southwestern Louisiana Bulldogs football team =

American college football season

1942 Southwestern Louisiana Bulldogs football
- Conference: Louisiana Intercollegiate Conference
- Record: 3–4 (2–1 LIC)
- Head coach: Louis Whitman (1st season)
- Home stadium: McNaspy Stadium

1942 Louisiana Intercollegiate Conference football standings
	Conf.					Overall
Team	W		L		T	W		L		T
Louisiana Normal $	3	–	0	–	0	6	–	2	–	0
Southwestern Louisiana	2	–	1	–	0	3	–	4	–	0
Louisiana Tech	1	–	2	–	0	6	–	3	–	0
Southeastern Louisiana	0	–	3	–	0	5	–	5	–	0
$ – Conference champion

The 1942 Southwestern Louisiana Bulldogs football team was an American football team that represented the Southwestern Louisiana Institute of Liberal and Technical Learning (now known as the University of Louisiana at Lafayette) in the Louisiana Intercollegiate Conference during the 1942 college football season. In their first year under head coach Louis Whitman, the team compiled a 3–4 record.

Southwestern Louisiana was ranked at No. 153 (out of 590 college and military teams) in the final rankings under the Litkenhous Difference by Score System for 1942.

== Schedule ==
Date	Opponent	Site	Result	Attendance	Source
September 25	at Alabama*	Cramton Bowl; Montgomery, AL	L 0–54	7,500	
October 9	Southeastern Louisiana	McNaspy Stadium; Lafayette, LA (rivalry)	W 35–13		
October 16	Ouachita College*	McNaspy Stadium; Lafayette, LA	L 0–6		
October 23	Camp Beauregard*	McNaspy Stadium; Lafayette, LA	W 62–0		
October 30	Louisiana Tech	McNaspy Stadium; Lafayette, LA (rivalry)	W 12–7		
November 6	Louisiana Normal	McNaspy Stadium; Lafayette, LA	L 6–11		
November 21	at Sam Houston State*	Pritchett Field; Huntsville, TX	L 0–7		
*Non-conference game
