= 1944 Southwestern Louisiana Bulldogs football team =

American college football season

1944 Southwestern Louisiana Bulldogs football

LIC champion
- Conference: Louisiana Intercollegiate Conference
- Record: 5–4 (3–1 LIC)
- Head coach: Louis Whitman (3rd season)
- Home stadium: McNaspy Stadium

The 1944 Southwestern Louisiana Bulldogs football team was an American football team that represented the Southwestern Louisiana Institute of Liberal and Technical Learning (now known as the University of Louisiana at Lafayette) in the Louisiana Intercollegiate Conference during the 1944 college football season. In their third year under head coach Louis Whitman, the team compiled a 5–4 record.

== Schedule ==
Date	Time	Opponent	Site	Result	Attendance	Source
September 22		La Garde General Hospital*	McNaspy Stadium; Lafayette, LA	W 53–0	6,000	
September 30	8:30 p.m.	Keesler Field*	McNaspy Stadium; Lafayette, LA	L 0–13		
October 7		Arkansas A&M*	McNaspy Stadium; Lafayette, LA	L 6–18		
October 14		at Louisiana Tech	Tech Stadium; Ruston, LA	W 15–0		
October 21		Louisiana Normal	McNaspy Stadium; Lafayette, LA	W 19–7		
November 4		Millsaps*	McNaspy Stadium; Lafayette, LA	L 0–19		
November 11		at Lake Charles Army Air Field*	Lake Charles, LA	W 24–0		
November 18		Louisiana Tech	McNaspy Stadium; Lafayette, LA	L 0–7		
November 25		at Louisiana Normal	Demon Stadium; Natchitoches, LA	W 7–6		
*Non-conference game
