= 1945 Louisiana Tech Bulldogs football team =

American college football season

1945 Louisiana Tech Bulldogs football

LIC champion
- Conference: Louisiana Intercollegiate Conference
- Record: 6–4 (3–1 LIC)
- Head coach: Joe Aillet (5th season)
- Captains: Bob Aillet; Herb Schene
- Home stadium: Tech Stadium

The 1945 Louisiana Tech Bulldogs football team was an American football team that represented the Louisiana Polytechnic Institute (now known as Louisiana Tech University) as a member of the Louisiana Intercollegiate Conference during the 1945 college football season. In their fifth year under head coach Joe Aillet, the team compiled a 6–4 record.

== Schedule ==
Date	Opponent	Site	Result	Attendance	Source
September 15	Lake Charles AAF*	Tech Stadium; Ruston, LA	W 7–2		
September 29	Howard (AL)*	Tech Stadium; Ruston, LA	W 32–6		
October 5	at Southwestern Louisiana	McNaspy Stadium; Lafayette, LA (rivalry)	W 14–12		
October 13	at Ole Miss*	Hemingway Stadium; Oxford, MS	L 21–26	3,500	
October 20	Southwestern (TX)*	Tech Stadium; Ruston, LA	W 20–14		
October 27	Northwestern State	Tech Stadium; Ruston, LA (rivalry)	W 18–7		
November 3	Barksdale Field*	Tech Stadium; Ruston, LA	L 7–12		
November 10	at Northwestern State	Demon Field; Natchitoches, LA	W 7–2		
November 17	Southwestern Louisiana	Tech Stadium; Ruston, LA	L 7–13		
November 24	at Auburn*	Auburn Stadium; Auburn, AL	L 0–29	3,000	
*Non-conference game
