= Joe Aillet Stadium =

College football stadium in Ruston, Louisiana

Origin Bank Field at Joe Aillet Stadium
- "The Joe"
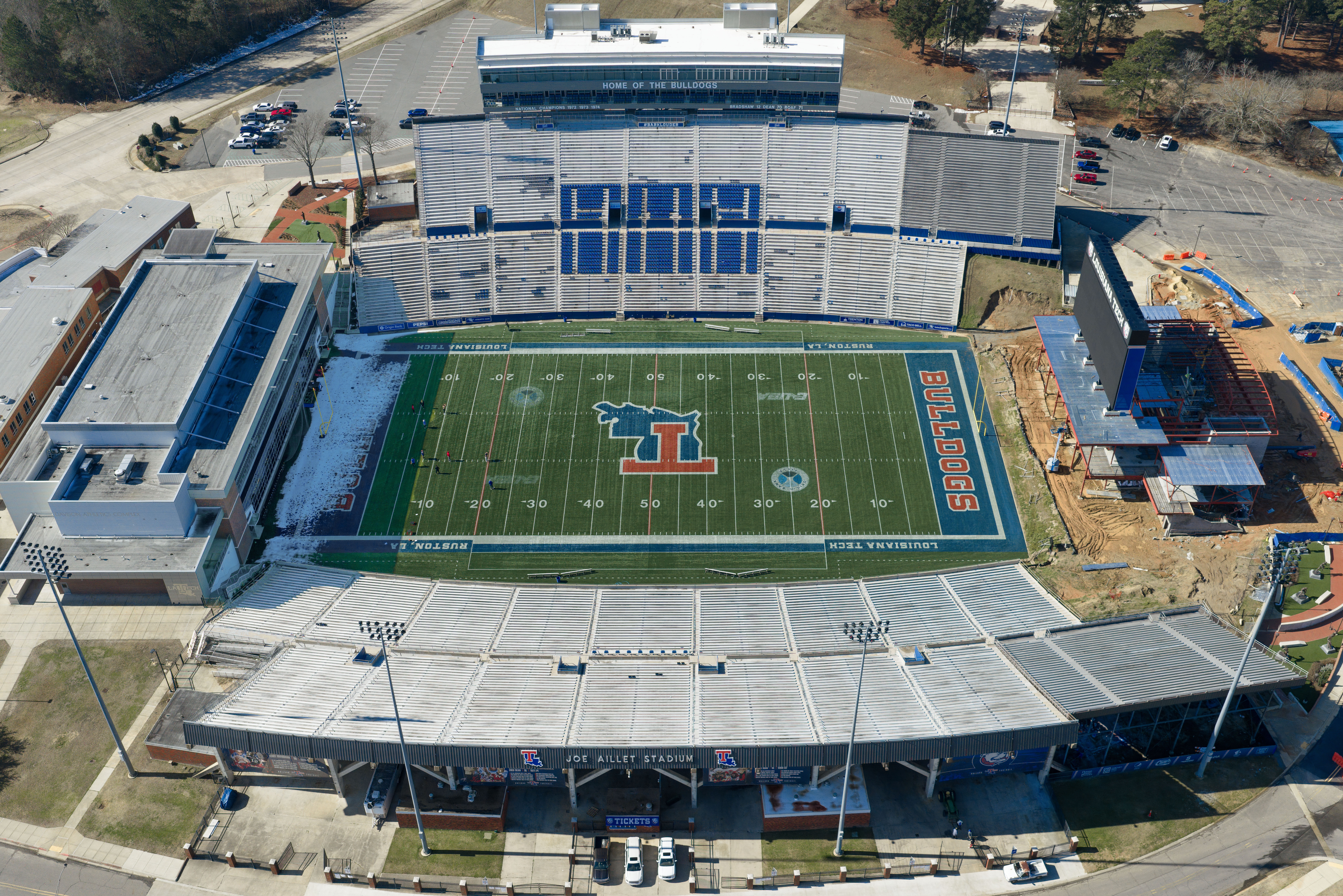
- The stadium in 2026
- Interactive map of Origin Bank Field at Joe Aillet Stadium
- Former names: Louisiana Tech Stadium (1968–1972)
- Address: 1450 West Alabama Avenue
- Location: Ruston, LA 71272
- Coordinates: 32.532021°N 92.655899°W
- Owner: Louisiana Tech University
- Operator: Louisiana Tech University
- Capacity: 23,000 (1968–1988); 30,600 (1989–2013); 27,717 (2014); 28,019 (2015–2016); 28,562 (2017–present)
- Surface: Grass (1968–2005); FieldTurf (2006–2025); Pivot Turf (2025-present)
- Record attendance: 28,714 (September 13, 1997 vs. Northeast Louisiana)

Construction
- Opened: September 28, 1968

Tenants
- Louisiana Tech Bulldogs football (NCAA college football) (1968–present); Lady Techster soccer team (2004–2008)

Joe Aillet Stadium (formerly Louisiana Tech Stadium) is a college football stadium in Ruston, Louisiana and the home field of the Louisiana Tech University Bulldogs football team, which competes in the Sun Belt Conference. The football stadium replaced the original Tech Stadium where the school's football program played its home games on campus until 1967.

Originally called Louisiana Tech Stadium, Joe Aillet Stadium opened in 1968 and was renamed for retired Louisiana Tech head football coach and athletic director Joe Aillet in 1972.

== History ==
The stadium was built in 1968 with an original capacity of 23,318 as a replacement for the original "Tech Stadium" on the university's campus. The new football stadium was constructed on the northwest portion of the campus as part of a new athletic complex which included a 3,000-seat baseball stadium now known as J. C. Love Field at Pat Patterson Park, 10 lighted tennis courts, and a track and field complex now known as the Jim Mize Track and Field Complex.

The new stadium, opened as Louisiana Tech Stadium, hosted its first Louisiana Tech home football game on September 28, 1968, when quarterback Terry Bradshaw led the Bulldogs to a 35–7 victory over the East Carolina University Pirates.

After four seasons as Tech Stadium, the stadium was renamed Joe Aillet Stadium prior to the 1972 season in honor of Joe Aillet, the longtime head football coach and athletic director of Louisiana Tech who died on December 28, 1971. On November 11, 1972, the official dedication ceremonies of the newly renamed Joe Aillet Stadium were held during a home football game between Tech and Eastern Michigan.

The Charles Wyly Athletic Center was opened in 2001, located in the south endzone. This facility included multiple amenities for the student-athletes, as well as an exhibit of Louisiana Tech football history. In 2015 the Davison Athletics Complex was opened nearby, adding more amenities as well as an indoor viewing area for fans. In 2017 the press box and sky box on the home side were renovated, adding luxury suites and more media work areas. In 2023 the Sarah and A.L. Williams Champions Plaza was completed, which honors multiple Louisiana Tech athletes. The most recent additions are still ongoing, which include a new student-athlete success center to be located in the north endzone as well as a new videoboard.

== Notable games and moments ==
=== 1960s ===
- September 28, 1968: Louisiana Tech defeated East Carolina 35–7 in the first home football game inside the new Tech Stadium.

=== 1970s ===
- December 1, 1973: Louisiana Tech defeated Western Illinois 18–13 in a Division II Quarterfinals game. Tech would go on to win the Division II National Championship in 1973.
- November 30, 1974: Louisiana Tech defeated Western Carolina 10–7 in a Division II Quarterfinals game.

=== 1980s ===
- December 4, 1982: Louisiana Tech defeated South Carolina State 38–3 in a Division I-AA Quarterfinal playoff game.
- November 24, 1984: Louisiana Tech defeated Mississippi Valley State 66–19 in a Division I-AA 1st Round Playoff Game. Tech would eventually lose in the Division I-AA Championship game against Delaware later that year.
- September 12, 1987: Louisiana Tech lost to Northeast Louisiana University (now known as UL-Monroe) 44–7 in front of 24,975 people, the largest crowd for a Tech home football game in Joe Aillet Stadium at that point. The attendance record for this game would last for ten seasons.
- October 14, 1989: In their first home football game at The Joe as a Division I-A football program, Louisiana Tech defeated Northern Illinois 42–21.

=== 1990s ===
- September 13, 1997: A crowd of 28,714 witnesses Louisiana Tech's 17–16 victory over Northeast Louisiana University. The crowd still remains the largest crowd to witness a Louisiana Tech home football game at Joe Aillet Stadium.
- September 5, 1998: Future professional quarterback Tim Rattay was involved in the first-ever matchup of future pro quarterbacks at the stadium, facing off against UCF's Daunte Culpepper.

=== 2000s ===
- September 16, 2000: In the first-ever overtime game in Joe Aillet Stadium, Louisiana Tech lost to Stephen F. Austin 34–31 in double overtime.
- December 5, 2002: Louisiana Tech lost to Fresno State 45–13 in the first nationally televised home football game in the history of The Joe.
- October 2, 2004: Louisiana Tech upset (17) Fresno State 28–21 in the first home game at The Joe to feature a Top-25 ranked team.
- August 30, 2008: Louisiana Tech defeated Mississippi State 22–14. This was the first matchup between Tech and a school from a BCS conference at Joe Aillet Stadium.

=== 2010s ===
- November 3, 2012: (25) Louisiana Tech defeated UTSA 51–27 at The Joe in front of a crowd of 23,645. This marks the first home football game at The Joe in which Louisiana Tech was ranked in the Top 25.
- November 17, 2012: In the first home game at The Joe as a Top-20 college football program, (19) Louisiana Tech lost to Utah State 48–41 in overtime in front of 25,614. This crowd marks the third largest attendance in the history of The Joe.

=== 2020s ===
- October 10, 2026:In front of 20,035, Louisiana Tech would erase an 11-point fourth quarter deficit to defeat UL-Lafayette 32-31 in the Bulldogs' first ever Sun Belt Conference game. This would extend Louisiana Tech's winning streak against the Ragin' Cajuns to nine straight dating back to 1997.
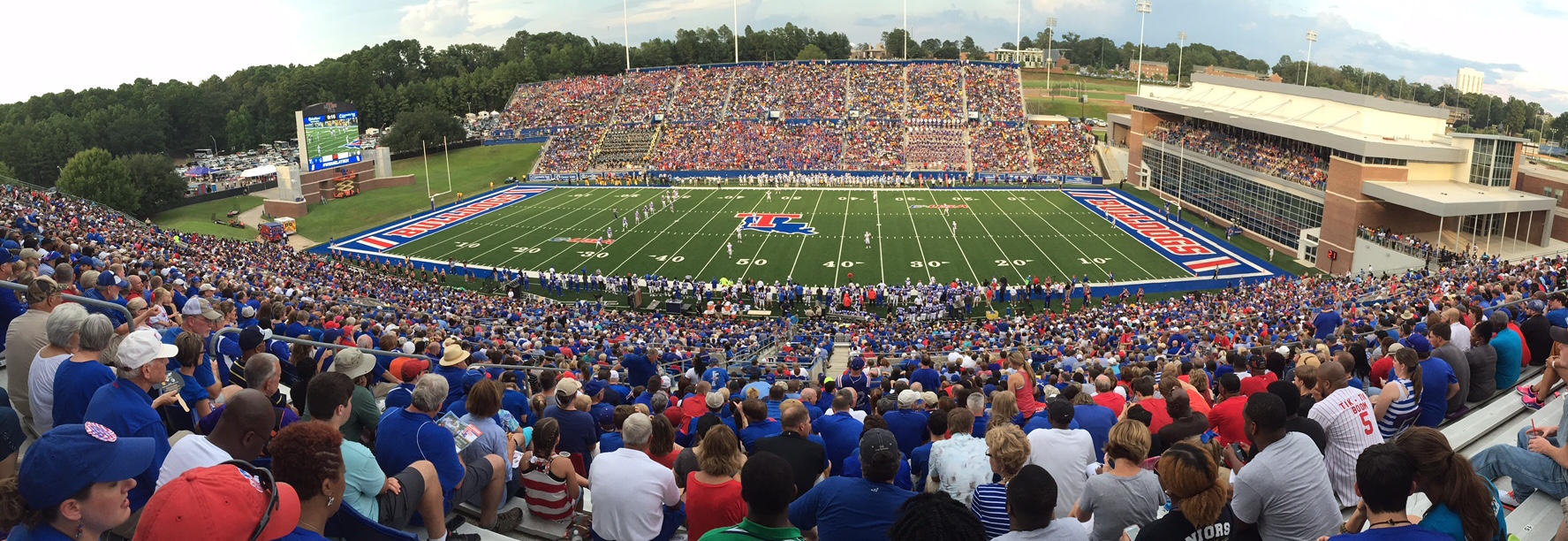

== Features ==
=== Charles Wyly Athletic Center ===
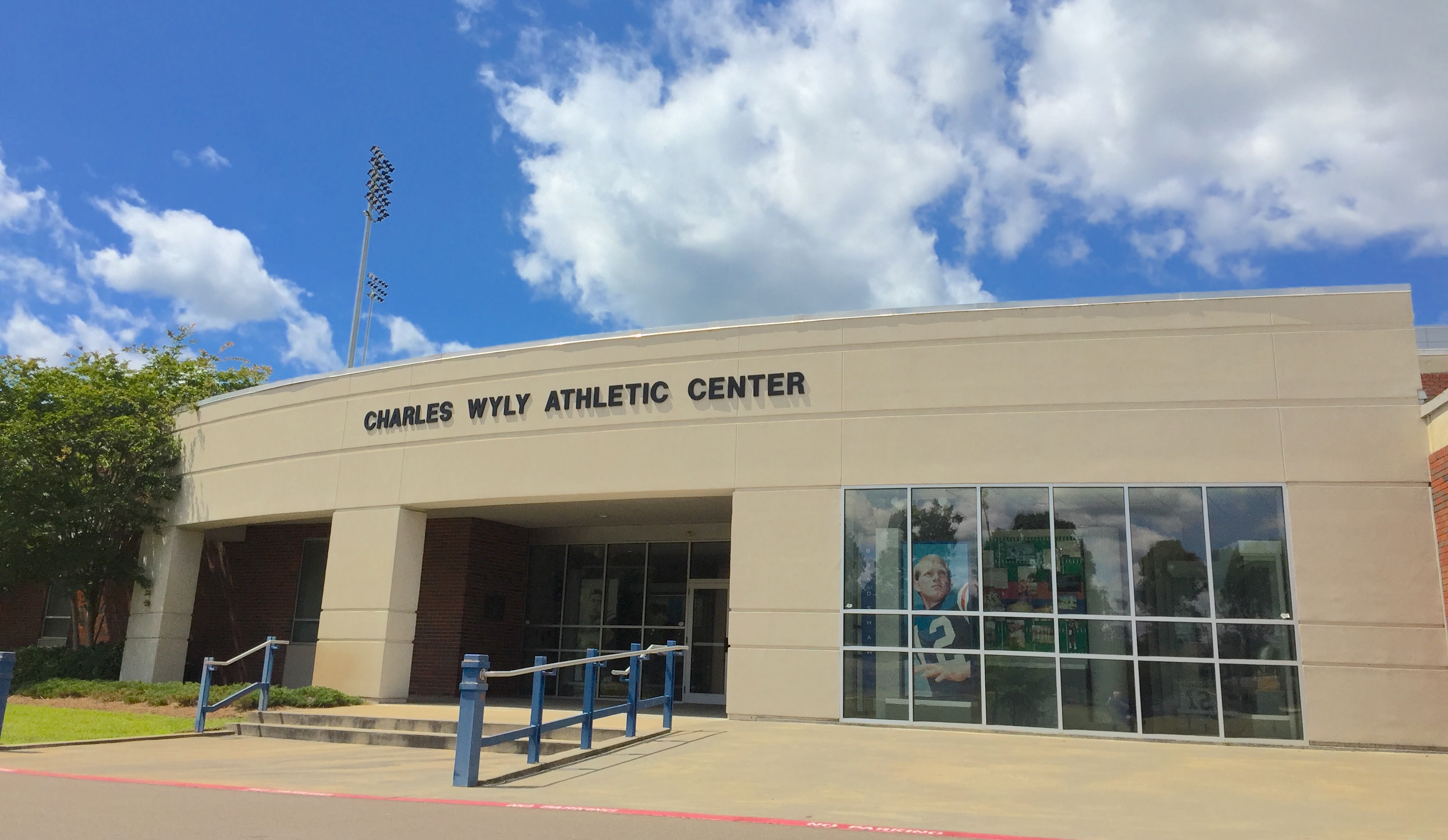
Charles Wyly Athletic Center

The Charles Wyly Athletic Center is located at the southwest side of Joe Aillet Stadium adjacent to the Davison Athletics Complex and the field house. Construction of the Wyly Athletic Center began in 2000, and the facility opened in June 2001. The 15,000-square-foot (1,400 m^{2}) facility houses the Dr. William Bundrick Sports Medicine Center, Dr. Guthrie Jarrell Conference Room, Louisiana Tech football museum, coaches offices, and team meeting rooms. The Bundrick Sports Medicine Center includes a Swimex therapeutic pool, cardiovascular equipment, physician's examination room, and staff offices. The museum was designed by Richard Smith of Murphy and Orr Exhibits and features Terry Bradshaw memorabilia, plaques for each Tech All-American, displays honoring Tech's top offensive and defensive players, a 100-year timeline of Bulldog football, a lighted wall collage of La. Tech legends, and other exhibits. The $2.5 million facility was privately funded by a $1 million gift from businessman Charles Wyly and contributions from physicians Dr. William Bundrick and Dr. Guthrie Jarrell.

=== Davison Athletics Complex ===
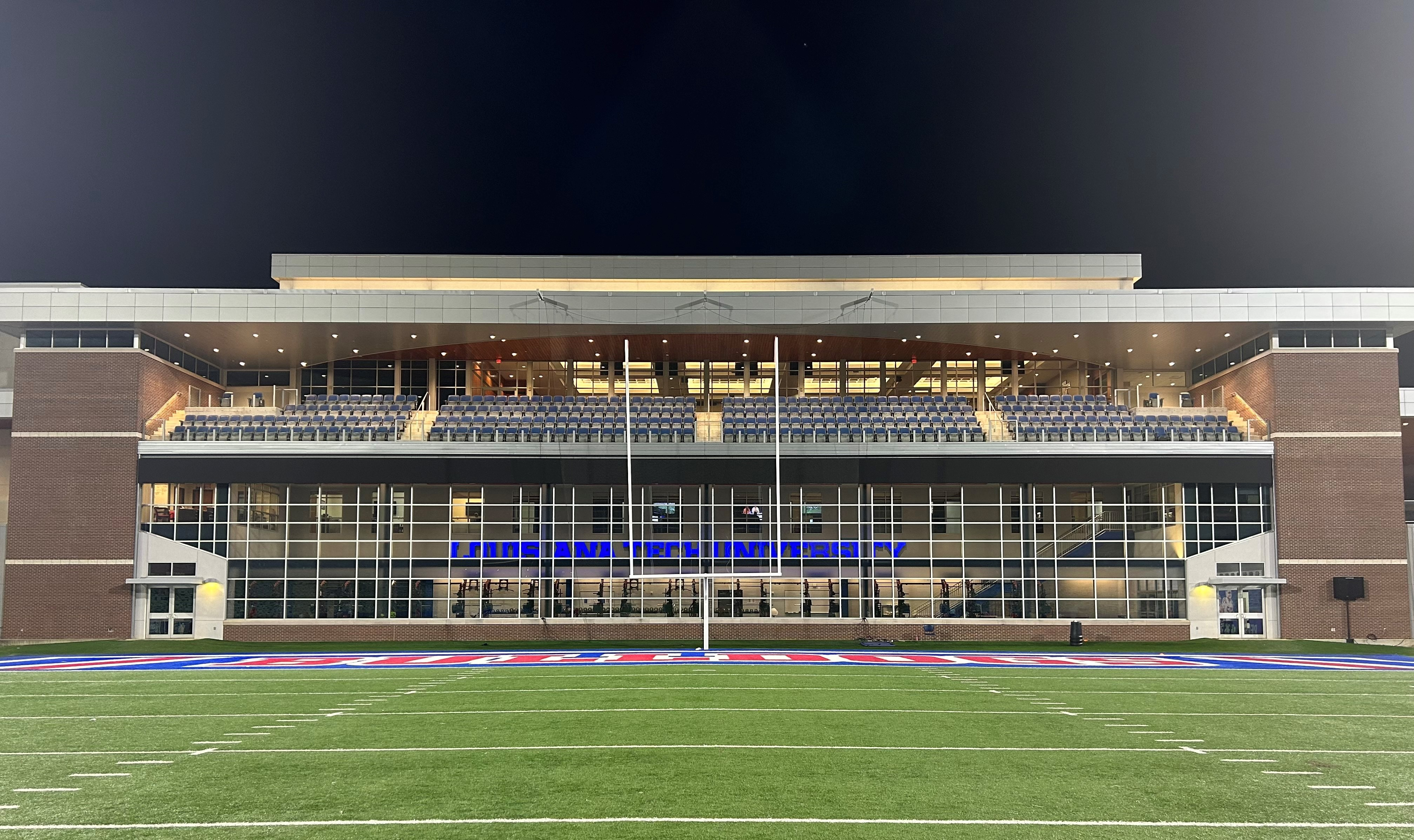
Davison Athletics Complex

The Davison Athletics Complex is located behind the south end zone of Joe Aillet Stadium. The three-story, 70,000-square-foot (6,500 m^{2}) facility features a weight room, locker room, players lounge, auditorium, coaches offices, position meeting rooms and the club level. The $22 million facility opened on September 4, 2015. The project was led by Ruston-based contractor Lincoln Builders.

=== Press Box and Suites ===
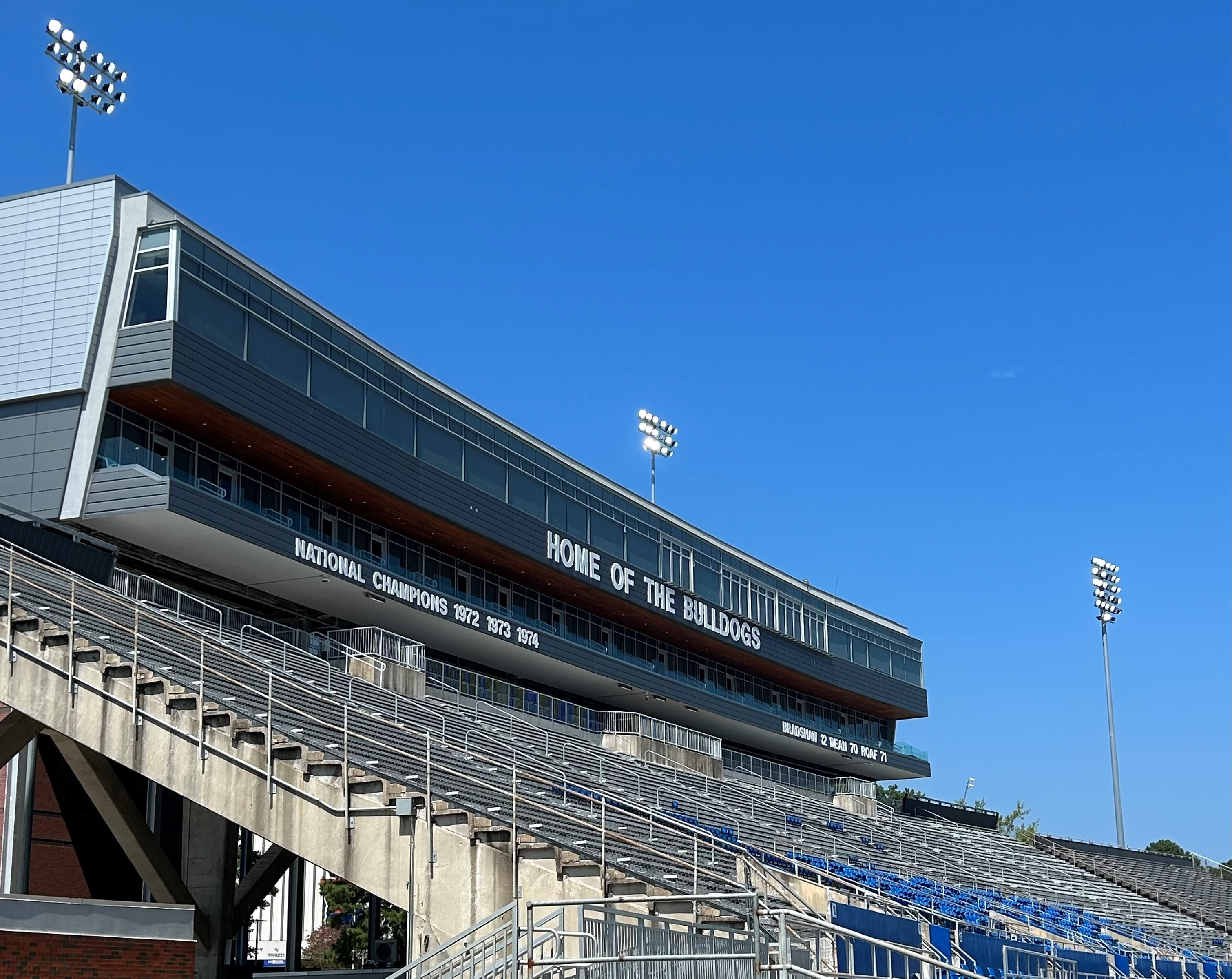
Joe Aillet Stadium Skybox Suites and Press Box

The press box and suites are located above the bleachers on the home side of Joe Aillet Stadium. Originally built in 1968 and expanded in 1988, the sky box was renovated and replaced in time for the 2017 season. The first floor of the facility includes multiple luxury suites for fans; and the second floor includes room for coaches, broadcast members, and gameday officials. Additional signage was added onto the front, in time for the 2023 season, which highlighted the program's 3 national championships and 3 retired jersey numbers.

=== Sarah and A.L. Williams Champions Plaza ===
Sarah and A.L. Williams Champions Plaza is a plaza located on the north side of Joe Aillet Stadium. The plaza recognizes the achievements of many notable Bulldogs and Lady Techsters, including statues of Terry Bradshaw, Fred Dean, Willie Roaf, Karl Malone, Kim Mulkey, and Teresa Weatherspoon. Groundbreaking commenced on April 22, 2023, and the statue unveiling occurred September 20 of the same year.

=== Dawgzilla ===
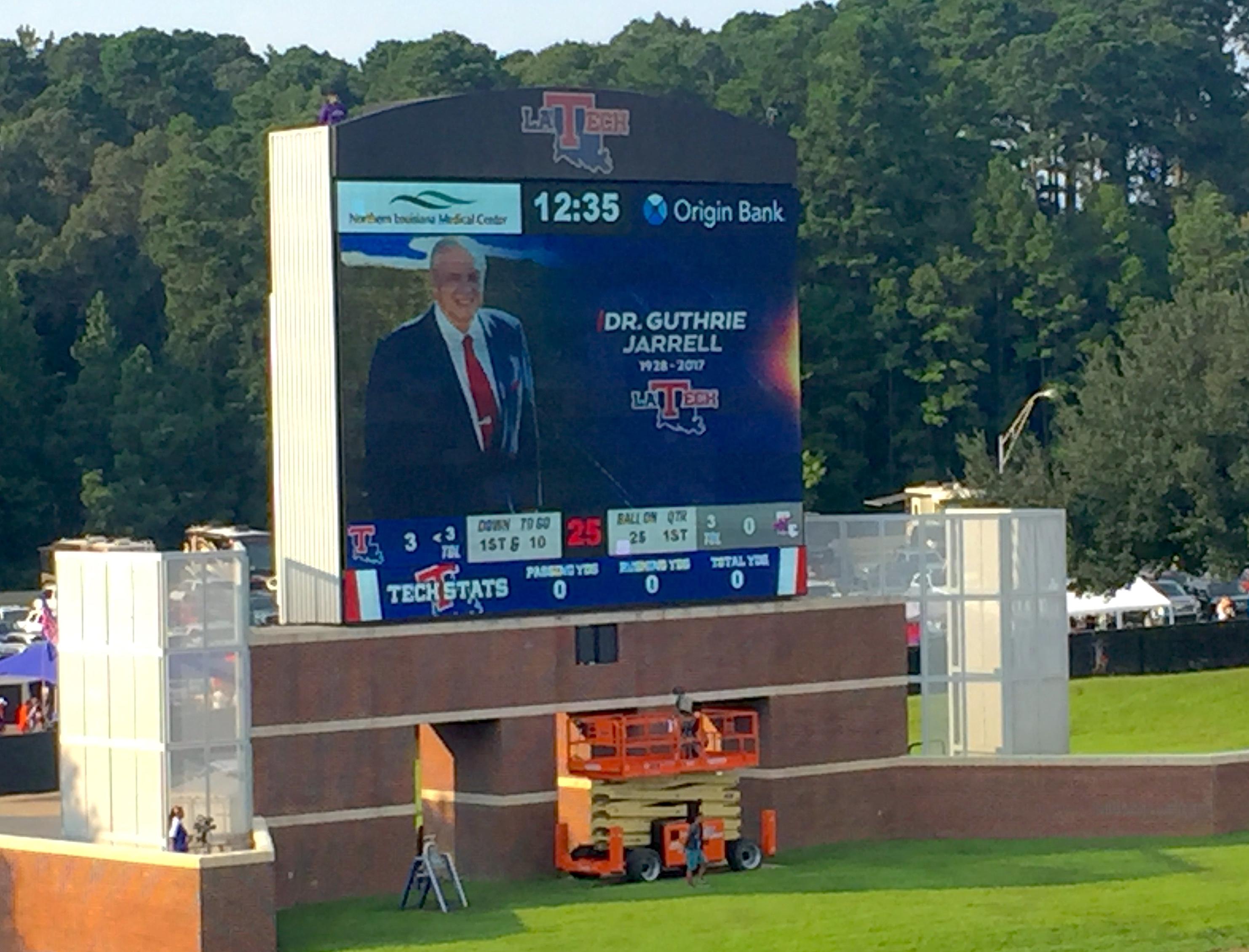
Dawgzilla

Dawgzilla is the name of the HD LED video display board and sound system located behind the north end zone of Joe Aillet Stadium. The video board was designed, manufactured, and installed by Daktronics during the summer of 2009. The HD-X video display measures 25 feet (7.6 m) high by 45 feet (14 m) wide with a 16-millimetre (0.63 in) pixel pitch. Two ribbon boards placed directly above and below the main video display each measure 4 feet (1.2 m) high by 45 feet (14 m) wide with 23-millimetre (0.91 in) pixel pitches. The total video display area measures 1,485 square feet (138.0 m^{2}), which made Dawgzilla the largest video board in the Western Athletic Conference after its construction in 2009. Also installed atop the video display is a custom Sportsound sound system. The video board is mounted on a brick foundation constructed by Lincoln Builders and is flanked by artistic metal displays. The Dawgzilla project cost $2 million and was financed through a partnership with Learfield Sports and Community Trust Bank. The board will soon be replaced by the Center for Student-Athlete Success, with a new video board being placed above.

== Other uses ==
In 1985 Louisiana Tech hosted the New Orleans Saints training camp.

On October 14, 2005 Tulane used the stadium for their game against UTEP. Tulane's football team was displaced after their home stadium, the Louisiana Superdome, was damaged by Hurricane Katrina in August 2005 and had to play all their football games on the road that season.

The Louisiana Tech Lady Techster soccer team originally used Joe Aillet Stadium as its home facility upon the program's inception in 2004. The first Lady Techster soccer game in the stadium was on August 28, 2005, a 2–0 win over the Mississippi Valley State Delta Devils. In 2009, the Lady Techsters soccer team moved to their new home field located across the street from the stadium.

== Future ==
In 2021, a multi-phase project was announced to upgrade and expand the stadium, including a Champions Plaza adjacent to Stadium Drive on the north side of the stadium and a ribbon board added to the facade of the Davison Athletics Complex on the south end. Most notably, the plans also include the construction of a new 22,300-square foot student-athlete access center to be located at the north end of the stadium. This also includes a new video board above the new center. These plans are all expected to be finished within the next 5 to 10 years.

== Gallery ==
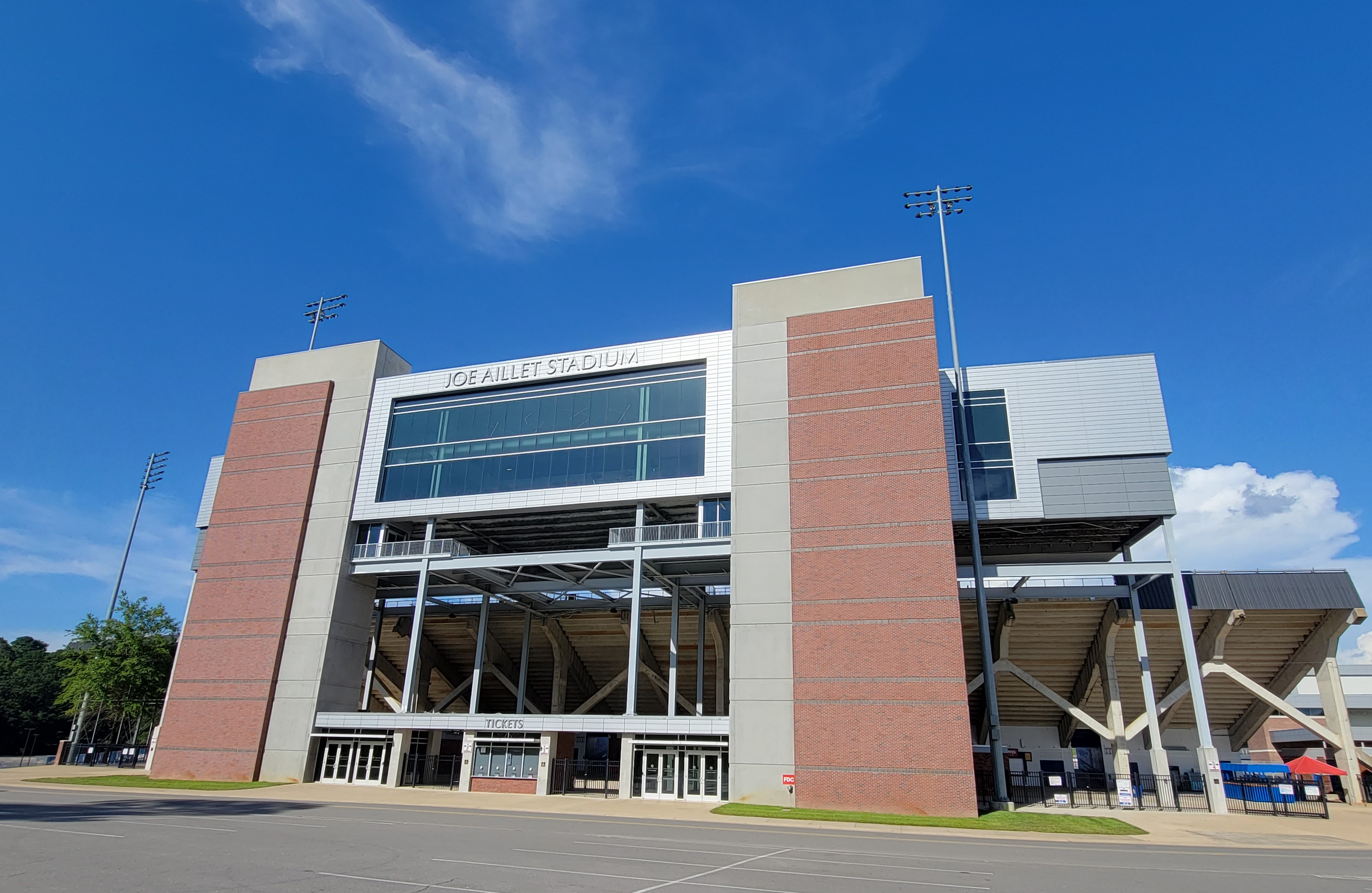
Joe Aillet Stadium Skybox Suites & Press Box

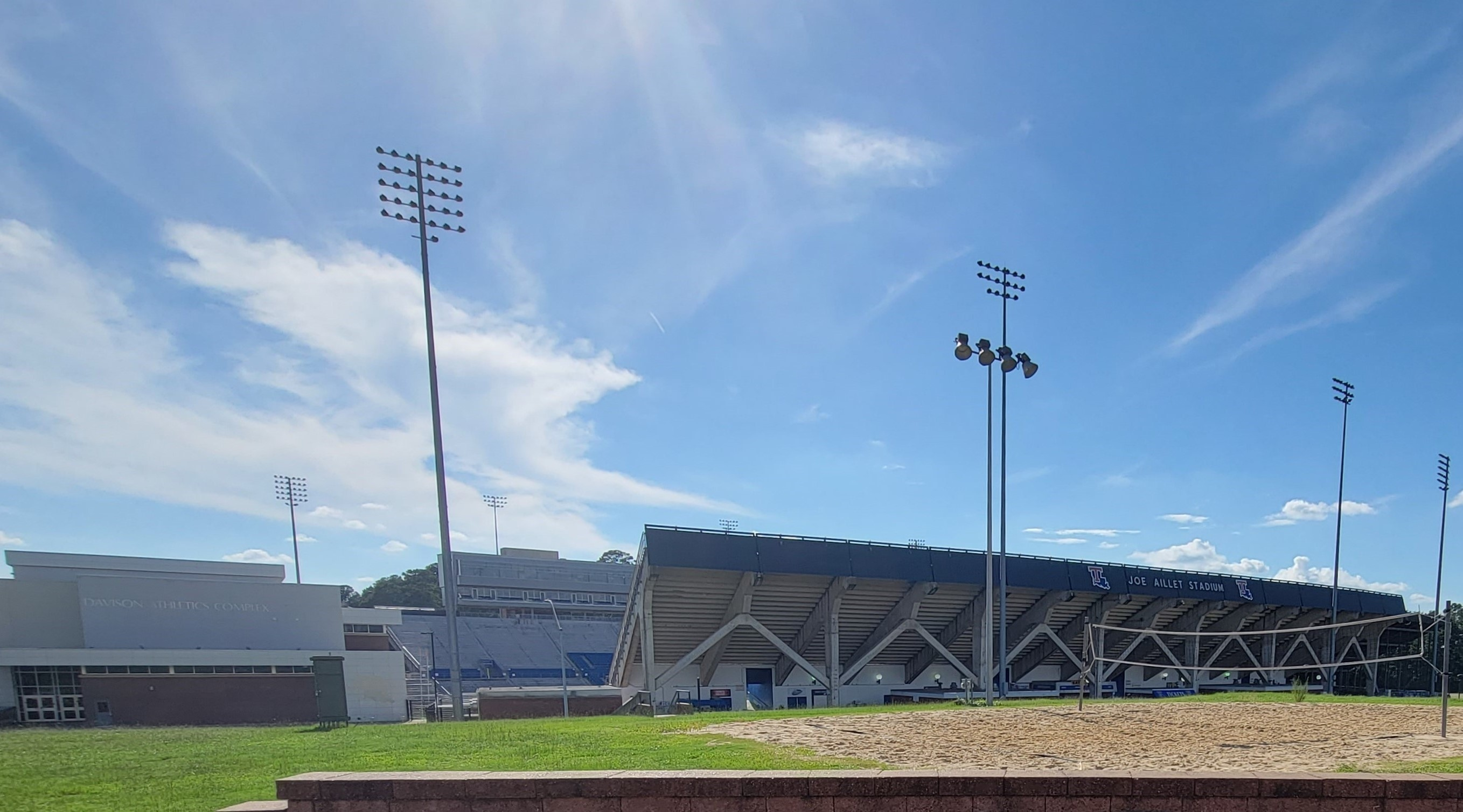
Joe Aillet Stadium away stands and Davison Athletics Complex exterior

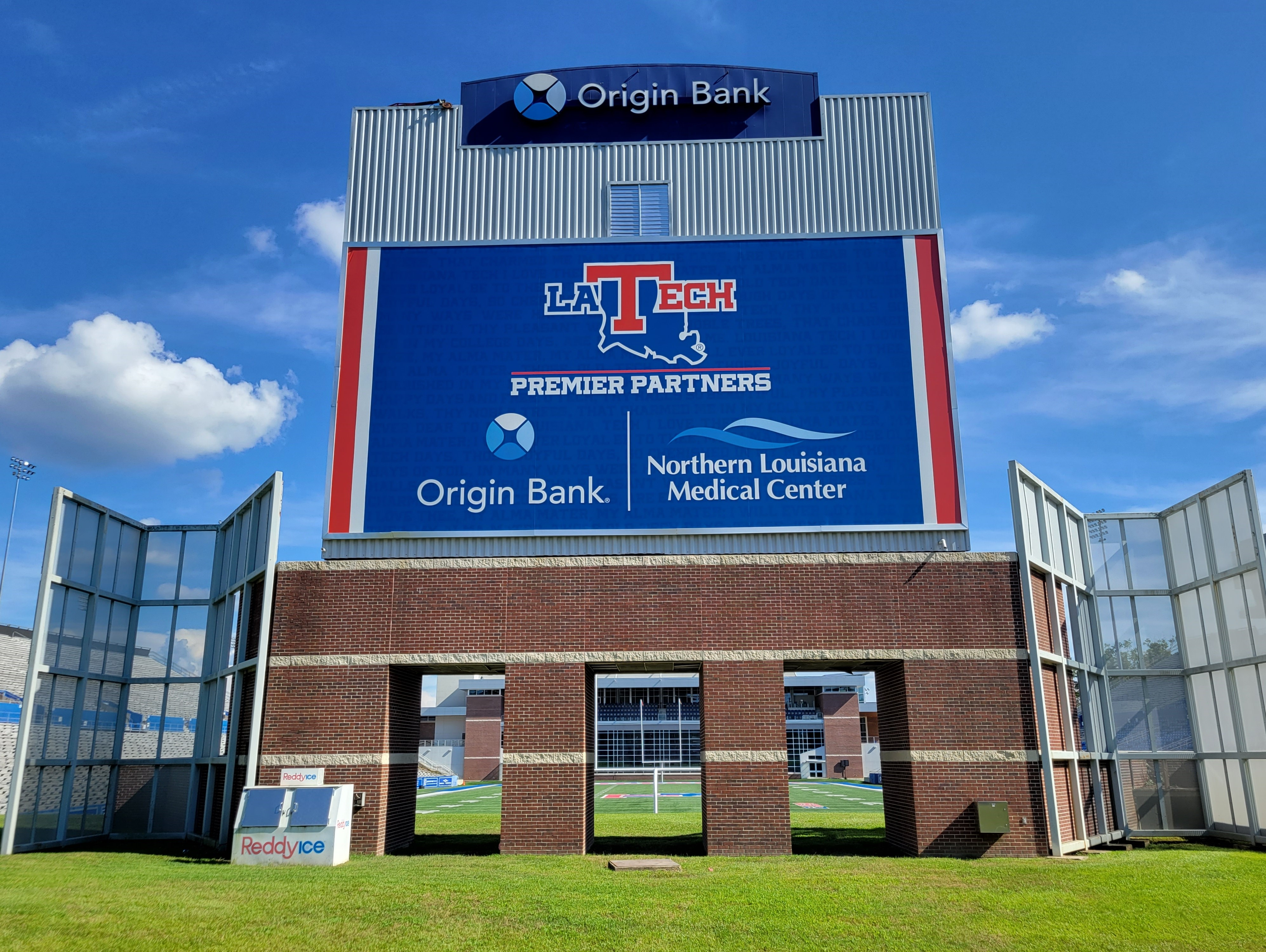
Joe Aillet Stadium "Dawgzilla" Video Board exterior

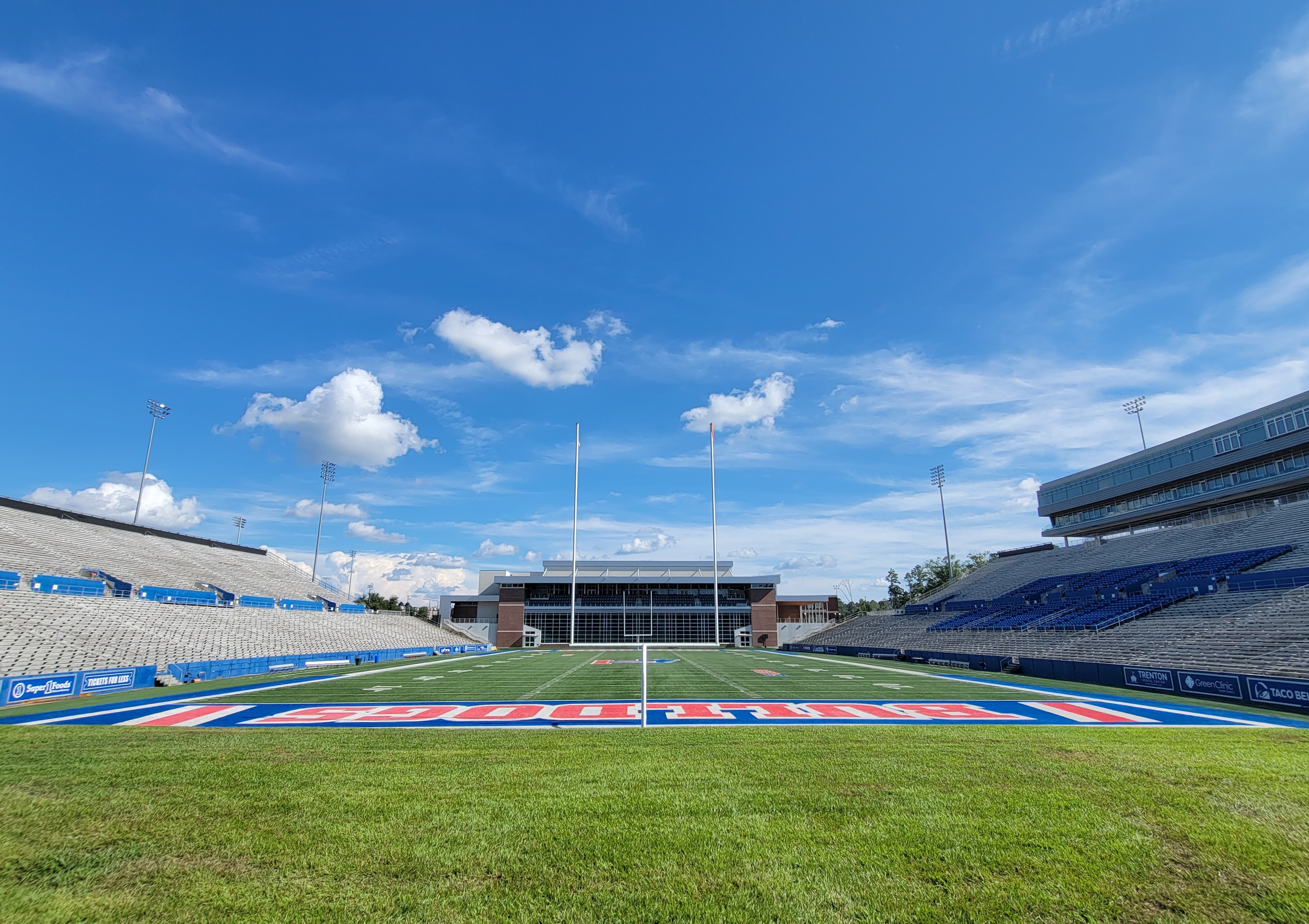
Joe Aillet Stadium Playing Field and Stadium

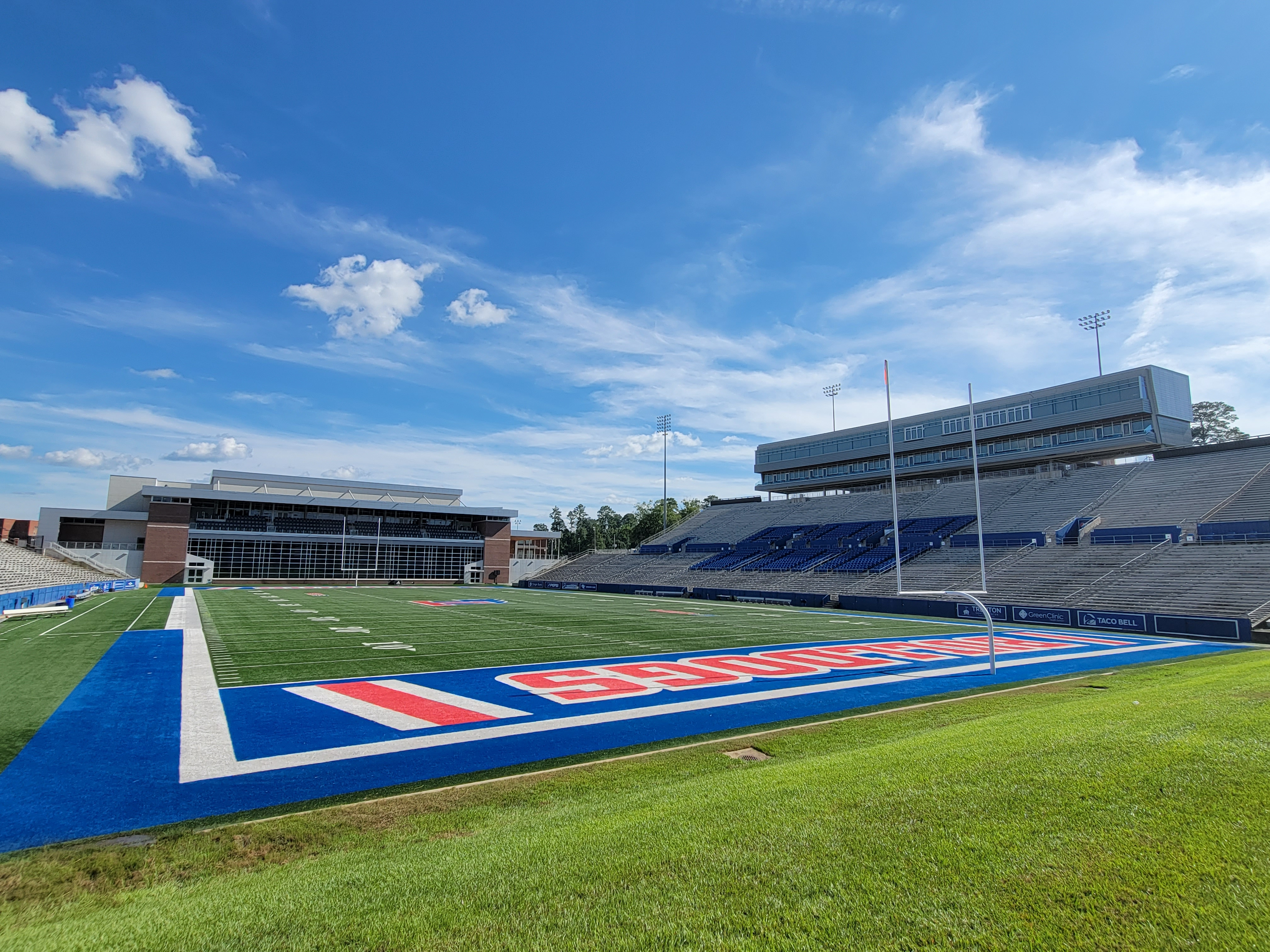
Joe Aillet Stadium Playing Field

== See also ==
- List of NCAA Division I FBS football stadiums
