= 1943 Arkansas A&M Boll Weevils football team =

American college football season

1943 Arkansas A&M Boll Weevils football

Oil Bowl, L 7–24 vs. Southwestern Louisiana
- Conference: Arkansas Intercollegiate Conference
- Record: 5–2–1 (0–0 AIC)
- Head coach: Gene Augusterfer (1st season)

The 1943 Arkansas A&M Boll Weevils football team represented Arkansas Agricultural and Mechanical College, later known as the University of Arkansas at Monticello, in the 1943 college football season. The Boll Weevils were coached by Gene Augusterfer, compiled a 5–2–1 record, and outscored their opponents 198 to 70.

== Schedule ==
Date	Time	Opponent	Rank	Site	Result	Attendance	Source
October 9	3:00 p.m.	at Arkansas*		Razorback Stadium; Fayetteville, AR	W 19–12		
October 16	8:00 p.m.	vs. Fort Knox*		Crump Stadium; Memphis, TN	W 33–0	2,000	
October 23		Camp Robinson*		Monticello, AR	W 64–0		
October 30		vs. Miami (OH)*		Crump Stadium; Memphis, TN	W 35–0	3,000	
November 6	2:30 p.m.	vs. No. 15 Southwestern Louisiana*	No. 17	Crump Stadium; Memphis, TN	T 20–20	2,000	
November 13		at Keesler Field*		Biloxi, MS	W 19–7	14,000	
November 20	2:30 p.m.	vs. Southwestern (TX)*		Louisiana State Fair Stadium; Shreveport, LA	L 0–7	4,500	
January 1, 1944	1:30 p.m.	vs. Southwestern Louisiana*		Rice Field; Houston, TX (Oil Bowl)	L 7–24	12,000	
*Non-conference game; Rankings from AP Poll released prior to the game; All times are in Central time

== Rankings ==
Ranking movements Legend: ██ Increase in ranking ██ Decrease in ranking — = Not ranked т = Tied with team above or below
	Week								
Poll	1	2	3	4	5	6	7	8	Final
AP	—	—	—	—	17т	—	—	—	—
