= 1942 Southwest Texas State Bobcats football team =

American college football season

1942 Southwest Texas State Bobcats football
- Conference: Lone Star Conference
- Record: 3–4–1 (0–2–1 LSC)
- Head coach: Joe Bailey Cheaney (8th season)
- Home stadium: Evans Field

1942 Lone Star Conference football standings
| | Conf. | | | | | Overall |
| Team | W | | L | | T | W | | L | | T |
|---|---|---|---|---|---|---|---|---|---|---|
| East Texas State $ | 2 | – | 0 | – | 1 | 4 | – | 3 | – | 1 |
| Sam Houston State | 2 | – | 1 | – | 0 | 5 | – | 3 | – | 0 |
| North Texas State | 1 | – | 2 | – | 0 | 3 | – | 5 | – | 0 |
| Southwest Texas State | 0 | – | 2 | – | 1 | 3 | – | 4 | – | 1 |
$ – Conference champion

The 1942 Southwest Texas State Bobcats football team was an American football team that represented Southwest Texas State Teachers College (now known as Texas State University) during the 1942 college football season as a member of the Lone Star Conference (LSC). In their eighth year under head coach Joe Bailey Cheaney, the team compiled an overall record of 3–4–1 with a mark of 0–2–1 in conference play.

Southwest Texas was ranked at No. 302 (out of 590 college and military teams) in the final rankings under the Litkenhous Difference by Score System for 1942.

== Schedule ==
| Date | Opponent | Site | Result | Source |
|---|---|---|---|---|
| September 25 | Howard Payne* | Evans Field; San Marcos, TX | W 6–0 | |
| October 2 | at Schreiner* | Kerrville, TX | L 0–28 | |
| October 9 | Southwestern (TX)* | Evans Field; San Marcos, TX | W 19–12 | |
| October 17 | Randolph Field* | Evans Field; San Marcos, TX | W 21–0 | |
| October 24 | at Abilene Christian* | Abilene, TX | L 0–26 | |
| October 30 | at North Texas State | Eagle Field; Denton, TX | L 6–10 | |
| November 6 | East Texas State | Evans Field; San Marcos, TX | T 7–7 | |
| November 14 | Sam Houston State | Evans Field; San Marcos, TX (rivalry) | L 20–23 | |
*Non-conference game
