= 1942 North Texas State Teachers Eagles football team =

American college football season

1942 North Texas State Teachers Eagles football
- Conference: Lone Star Conference
- Record: 3–5 (1–2 LSC)
- Head coach: Lloyd Russell (1st season)
- Home stadium: Eagle Field

1942 Lone Star Conference football standings
	Conf.					Overall
Team	W		L		T	W		L		T
East Texas State $	2	–	0	–	1	4	–	3	–	1
Sam Houston State	2	–	1	–	0	5	–	3	–	0
North Texas State	1	–	2	–	0	3	–	5	–	0
Southwest Texas State	0	–	2	–	1	3	–	4	–	1
$ – Conference champion

The 1942 North Texas State Teachers Eagles football team was an American football team that represented the North Texas State Teachers College (now known as the University of North Texas) during the 1942 college football season as a member of the Lone Star Conference. In their first and only year under head coach Lloyd Russell, the team compiled a 3–5 record.

North Texas was ranked at No. 317 (out of 590 college and military teams) in the final rankings under the Litkenhous Difference by Score System for 1942.

== Schedule ==
Date	Opponent	Site	Result	Attendance	Source
September 18	at Howard Payne*	Lion Stadium; Brownwood, TX	L 0–14		
September 26	at SMU*	Ownby Stadium; University Park, TX (rivalry)	L 6–27	7,000	
October 3	at Hardin–Simmons*	Abilene, TX	L 0–34		
October 10	Camp Hood*	Eagle Field; Denton, TX	W 47–0		
October 24	at Sam Houston State	Pritchett Field; Huntsville, TX	L 20–21	3,000	
October 30	Southwest Texas State	Eagle Field; Denton, TX	W 10–6		
November 6	Austin*	Eagle Field; Denton, TX	W 32–12		
November 13	at East Texas State	Lion Stadium; Commerce, TX	L 7–16		
*Non-conference game
