= 1942 Sam Houston State Bearkats football team =

American college football season

1942 Sam Houston State Bearkats football
- Conference: Lone Star Conference
- Record: 5–3 (2–1 LSC)
- Head coach: Puny Wilson (5th season)
- Home stadium: Pritchett Field

1942 Lone Star Conference football standings
	Conf.					Overall
Team	W		L		T	W		L		T
East Texas State $	2	–	0	–	1	4	–	3	–	1
Sam Houston State	2	–	1	–	0	5	–	3	–	0
North Texas State	1	–	2	–	0	3	–	5	–	0
Southwest Texas State	0	–	2	–	1	3	–	4	–	1
$ – Conference champion

The 1942 Sam Houston State Bearkats football team represented Sam Houston State Teachers College (now known as Sam Houston State University) as a member of the Lone Star Conference (LSC) during the 1942 college football season. Led by fifth-year head coach Puny Wilson, the Bearkats compiled an overall record of 5–3 with a mark of 2–1 in conference play, and finished second in the LSC.

Sam Houston was ranked at No. 388 (out of 590 college and military teams) in the final rankings under the Litkenhous Difference by Score System for 1942.

== Schedule ==
Date	Opponent	Site	Result	Attendance	Source
September 25	at Lamar*	Greenie Stadium; Beaumont, TX	W 20–0		
October 2	at Louisiana Normal*	Demon Field; Natchitoches, LA	L 6–27		
October 16	at Louisiana Tech*	Tech Stadium; Ruston, LA	L 0–46		
October 24	North Texas State	Pritchett Field; Huntsville, TX	W 21–20	3,000	
October 30	at East Texas State	Commerce, TX	L 0–32		
November 7	Ellington Field*	Pritchett Field; Huntsville, TX	W 26–0		
November 14	at Southwest Texas State	Evans Field; San Marcos, TX (rivalry)	W 23–20		
November 21	Southwestern Louisiana*	Pritchett Field; Huntsville, TX	W 7–0		
*Non-conference game
