= Oil Bowl =

Former college football bowl game

The Oil Bowl was a college football bowl game played three times at Rice Field in Houston, Texas in the 1940s. Muddy conditions for the first game, and freezing temperatures for the third game, doomed future contests. In 1949, a junior college bowl game of the same name was played.

== Game results ==
Date	Winner		Loser		Location	Notes
January 1, 1944	Southwestern Louisiana	24	Arkansas A&M	7	Rice Field, Houston, Texas	
January 1, 1946	Georgia	20	Tulsa	6	Rice Field, Houston, Texas	notes
January 1, 1947	Georgia Tech	41	Saint Mary's	19	Rice Field, Houston, Texas	notes

== Game summaries ==
=== 1944 Oil Bowl ===
	1	2	3	4	Total
Bulldogs	3	7	7	7	24
Aggies	0	0	7	0	7

Some consider the New Year's Day bowl game of 1944 (after the 1943 season) to have been a college division/minor bowl game. Both rosters were made up of varsity players from ranked teams in the 1942 season. This was possible because both schools were participants in the World War II V-12 program. The Southwestern Louisiana Institute (SLI; now the University of Louisiana at Lafayette) team, for example, was composed of over 175 varsity players from other colleges. These numbers included 18 players from 19th-ranked Rice, nine players from 13th-ranked LSU, and eight players from the eighth-ranked Tulsa teams of 1942. These players were not all starters for the team; varsity players from other schools made up the majority of the team.

Alvin Dark of LSU, playing for SLI, passed for a touchdown, ran for a touchdown, and kicked three extra points; he also punted and returned punts for the Bulldogs. Dark later recalled that the game was played in "ankle-deep mud."

=== 1946 Oil Bowl ===
	1	2	3	4	Total
Bulldogs	7	0	0	13	20
Golden Hurricane	0	6	0	0	6

A three-yard touchdown rush was the opening score in the first ever Oil Bowl, held in Houston on January 1, 1946. Georgia took a 7–0 lead after this touchdown rush and the first quarter ended as such. Tulsa countered with a touchdown rush of their own, though it was only from one yard out. The PAT failed, making the score 7–6 Georgia at halftime. No scoring happened in the third quarter, and Georgia lengthened their lead in the fourth, scoring twice: a 54-yard pass and a 69-yard punt return, each by Charley Trippi. The PAT on the punt return was no good, and the game finished 20–6. Georgia finished with 288 total yards, and Tulsa finished with only 148.

=== 1947 Oil Bowl ===
	1	2	3	4	Total
No. 11 Yellow Jackets	7	20	7	7	41
Gaels	0	7	6	6	19

The second and last Oil Bowl saw No. 11 Georgia Tech take on St. Mary's in front of 23,000 spectators in Houston. The Yellow Jackets scored the first touchdown of the game in the first quarter and held a 7–0 lead. The second quarter saw Georgia Tech turn the offense on, outscoring St. Mary's 20–7 and taking a 27–7 lead into halftime. The third and fourth quarters were identical in score, with Georgia Tech outscoring St. Mary's 7–6 in both, making the second half score 14–12. The Yellow Jackets became the 1947 Oil Bowl champions, defeating St. Mary's 41–19.

== See also ==
- List of college bowl games
