= Louisiana Intercollegiate Conference =

Intercollegiate athletic conference in Louisiana from 1939 to 1947

- Founded: 1939
- Folded: 1948

The Louisiana Intercollegiate Conference (LIC) was an intercollegiate athletic conference that existed from 1939 to 1947, and featured institutions located in the state of Louisiana. The conference sponsored the following sports during its existence: football, track, tennis, and basketball.

== Members ==
Institution	Location	Founded	Nickname	Joined	Left	Current conference	Ref.
Centenary College	Shreveport, Louisiana	1825	Gentlemen	1939	1942	Southern (SCAC) (NCAA Division III)	
Louisiana College (Note: Currently known as Louisiana Christian University.)	Pineville, Louisiana	1906	Wildcats	1939	1948	Red River (RRAC) (NAIA)	
Louisiana Polytechnic Institute (Note: Currently known as Louisiana Tech University.) (Louisiana Tech)	Ruston, Louisiana	1894	Bulldogs	1939	1948	C-USA (NCAA Division I) (Sun Belt (NCAA Division I) in 2026)	
Louisiana State Normal College (Note: Later became Northwestern State College of Louisiana in 1944. Currently known as Northwestern State University.)	Natchitoches, Louisiana	1884	Demons	1939	1948	Southland (NCAA Division I)	
Southeastern Louisiana College (Note: Currently known as Southeastern Louisiana University.)	Hammond, Louisiana	1925	Lions	1941	1948	Southland (NCAA Division I)	
Southwestern Louisiana Institute of Liberal and Technical Learning (Note: Later became the University of Southwestern Louisiana in 1960. Currently known as the University of Louisiana at Lafayette.)	Lafayette, Louisiana	1898	Bulldogs	1939	1948	Sun Belt (NCAA Division I)	

== Football champions ==
- 1939 – Louisiana Normal
- 1940 – Southwestern Louisiana
- 1941 – Louisiana Tech
- 1942 – Louisiana Normal
- 1943 – No champion
- 1944 – Southwestern Louisiana
- 1945 – Louisiana Tech
- 1946 – Southeastern Louisiana
- 1947 – Louisiana Tech

== See also ==
- List of defunct college football conferences
