= 2016 Duke Blue Devils football team =

American college football season

2016 Duke Blue Devils football
- Conference: Atlantic Coast Conference
- Coastal Division
- Record: 4–8 (1–7 ACC)
- Head coach: David Cutcliffe (9th season)
- Offensive coordinator: Zac Roper (1st season)
- Offensive scheme: Multiple
- Defensive coordinator: Jim Knowles (7th season)
- Base defense: 4–2–5
- MVP: Daniel Jones
- Captains: Jela Duncan; DeVon Edwards; Thomas Sirk; A. J. Wolf
- Home stadium: Wallace Wade Stadium

2016 Atlantic Coast Conference football standings
	Conf.			Overall
Team	W		L	W		L
Atlantic Division
No. 1 Clemson xy$#	7	–	1	14	–	1
No. 21 Louisville x	7	–	1	9	–	4
No. 8 Florida State	5	–	3	10	–	3
NC State	3	–	5	7	–	6
Wake Forest	3	–	5	7	–	6
Boston College	2	–	6	7	–	6
Syracuse	2	–	6	4	–	8
Coastal Division
No. 16 Virginia Tech xy	6	–	2	10	–	4
North Carolina	5	–	3	8	–	5
No. 20 Miami (FL)	5	–	3	9	–	4
Pittsburgh	5	–	3	8	–	5
Georgia Tech	4	–	4	9	–	4
Duke	1	–	7	4	–	8
Virginia	1	–	7	2	–	10
Championship: Clemson 42, Virginia Tech 35
# – College Football Playoff champion; $ – Conference champion; x – Division champion/co-champions; y – Championship game participant; Rankings from AP Poll

The 2016 Duke Blue Devils football team represented Duke University in the 2016 NCAA Division I FBS football season as a member of the Atlantic Coast Conference (ACC) in the Coastal Division. The team was led by head coach David Cutcliffe, in his ninth year, and played its home games at Wallace Wade Stadium in Durham, North Carolina. They finished the season 4–8 overall and 1–7 in ACC play to tie for sixth place in the Coastal Division.

== Schedule ==
Date	Time	Opponent	Site	TV	Result	Attendance
September 3	6:00 p.m.	North Carolina Central*	Wallace Wade Stadium; Durham, NC	ACCN+	W 49–6	35,049
September 10	3:30 p.m.	Wake Forest	Wallace Wade Stadium; Durham, NC (rivalry)	ESPNU	L 14–24	21,077
September 17	8:00 p.m.	at Northwestern*	Ryan Field; Evanston, IL	BTN	L 13–24	34,464
September 24	3:30 p.m.	at Notre Dame*	Notre Dame Stadium; South Bend, IN	NBC	W 38–35	80,795
October 1	12:30 p.m.	Virginia^{†}	Wallace Wade Stadium; Durham, NC	ACCN	L 20–34	25,201
October 8	3:30 p.m.	Army*	Wallace Wade Stadium; Durham, NC	ACCRSN	W 13–6	20,613
October 14	7:00 p.m.	at No. 7 Louisville	Papa John's Cardinal Stadium; Louisville, KY	ESPN	L 14–24	55,121
October 29	12:00 p.m.	at Georgia Tech	Bobby Dodd Stadium; Atlanta, GA	ACCRSN	L 35–38	43,886
November 5	3:30 p.m.	No. 23 Virginia Tech	Wallace Wade Stadium; Durham, NC	ESPNU	L 21–24	38,217
November 10	7:30 p.m.	No. 15 North Carolina	Wallace Wade Stadium; Durham, NC (Victory Bell)	ESPN	W 28–27	39,212
November 19	3:00 p.m.	at Pittsburgh	Heinz Field; Pittsburgh, PA	ACCRSN	L 14–56	35,425
November 26	3:30 p.m.	at Miami (FL)	Hard Rock Stadium; Miami Gardens, FL	ESPN2	L 21–40	57,396
*Non-conference game; ^{†}Homecoming; Rankings from AP Poll released prior to the game; All times are in Eastern time

== Personnel ==
=== Roster ===
2016 Duke Blue Devils football team roster
Players
Coaches
Offense

Pos.	#	Name	Class
QB	1	Thomas Sirk	Sr
WR	3	T. J. Rahming	So
WR	5	Johnathan Lloyd	So
RB	6	Nicodem Pierre	So
WR	7	Keyston Fuller	Fr
WR	8	Aaron Young	Fr
WR	10	Ryan Smith	Sr
WR	11	Scott Bracey	Fr
QB	12	Parker Boehme	Jr
WR	13	Sayvon Sampson	So
JR	15	Quay Mann	Jr
QB	17	Daniel Jones	Fr
QB	18	Quentin Harris	Fr
WR	19	Quay Chambers	Jr
RB	22	Brittain Brown	Fr
RB	23	Joseph Ajeigbe	Jr
RB	25	Jela Duncan	Sr
RB	29	Shaun Wilson	Jr
RB	36	Elijah Deveaux	Fr
RB	38	Zach Boden	Sr
RB	45	Griffin Carter	So
RB	47	Ryan Wolitzer	Fr
C	50	Austin Davis	Jr
C	62	Alex Gourley	Fr
C	63	Zach Harmon	So
C	64	Jake Brodner	Sr
G	65	Julian Santos	Fr
G	66	Jaylen Miller	Fr
G	67	Clark Bulleit	So
G	69	Zach Baker	Fr
OT	70	Christian Miller	So
OT	71	Casey Blaser	Sr
OT	73	Reno Rosene	Fr
G	74	Franklin McNeill III	So
OT	75	Liam Smith	Fr
OT	76	Gabe Bradner	Jr
OT	77	Robert Kraeling	Fr
G	78	Sterling Korona	Jr
G	79	Tanner Stone	Sr
TE	80	Daniel Helm	So
TE	81	Davis Koppenhaver	So
WR	82	Chris Taylor	So
WR	83	Anthony Nash	Sr
WR	84	Trevon Lee	So
TE	85	Dan Beilinson	Sr
WR	87	Kane Banner	Sr
TE	88	Erich Schneider	Sr
TE	89	Mark Birmingham	Fr

Defense

Pos.	#	Name	Class
S	2	Javon Jackson	Fr
CB	4	Myles Hudzick	Fr
CB	9	Jeremy McDuffie	So
S	11	Gio Holmes-Garrido	So
S	13	Jordan Hayes	Fr
CB	14	Bryon Fields Jr.	Jr
S	16	Dylan Singleton	Fr
S	20	Jake Kite	Jr
S	21	Alonzo Saxton II	Jr
LB	24	Zavier Carmichael	Jr
S	26	Corbin McCarthy	Sr
S/CB	27	DeVon Edwards	Sr
CB	28	Mark Gilbert	Fr
S	30	Brandon Feamster	Fr
CB	31	Breon Borders	Fr
LB	32	Brandon Hill	Fr
S	33	Deondre Singleton	Sr
LB	34	Ben Humphreys	So
CB	35	Antone Williams	Fr
S	37	Phillip Carter	Jr
CB	39	Zach Muniz	Jr
S	40	Jacob Morgenstern	Fr
LB	41	Xander Gagnon	Fr
LB	43	Tinashe Bere	So
LB	44	Joe Giles-Harris	Fr
S	45	Kyle Wellner	Sr
S	46	Grant Hall	Sr
LB	49	Koby Quansah	Fr
LB	50	Wyatt Smith	Sr
DE	51	Dominic McDonald	Jr
DT	52	Zach Morris	Fr
DE	53	Scott Jones	Fr
LB	54	Kevin Gehsmann	So
DT	55	Brandon Boyce	So
DE	56	Danny Doyle	So
DE	59	Tre Hornbuckle	Fr
DE	60	Noah Waddell	Fr
DE	90	Terrell Lucas	Fr
DE	91	Marquies Price	So
DT	92	Edgar Cerenord	So
DT	93	A. J. Wolf	Sr
DE	94	Twazanga Mugala	Fr
DT	95	Trevon McSwain	Fr
DE	96	Allen Jackson	Sr
DT	97	Quaven Ferguson	So
DE	98	Chidi Okonya	Fr
DT	99	Mike Ramsey	Jr

Special teams

Pos.	#	Name	Class
P	42	Austin Parker	Fr
K/P	43	Danny Stirt	Sr
LS	46	Bronson Bruneau	Jr
K/P	47	Will Kline	Jr
K	48	A. J. Reed	Fr
LS	57	Thomas Hennessy	Sr
LS	58	Ben Wyatt	Fr
LS	61	Colin Duffy	Jr
K	94	Collin Wareham	Jr

Head coach

- David Cutcliffe

Coordinators/assistant coaches

Legend

- (C) Team captain
- (S) Suspended
- (I) Ineligible
- Injured
- Redshirt

Roster

=== Coaching staff ===
Name	Position	Seasons at Duke	Alma mater
David Cutcliffe	Head Coach	9th	Alabama (1976)
Zac Roper	Offensive Coordinator/The Baxter Family Associate head coach	9th	Ole Miss (2001)
Derek Jones	Assistant Special Teams Coordinator/Defensive Backs	9th	Ole Miss (1996)
Jim Knowles	Defensive Coordinator/ Inside Linebackers	6th	Cornell (1987)
Ben Albert	Associate Defensive Coordinator/Defensive Line	1st	Massachusetts (1995)
Jim Bridge	Special Teams Coordinator	1st	Wittenberg (1992)
Jim Collins	Defensive ends	8th	Elon (1974)
Marcus Johnson	Offensive line coach	5th	Ole Miss (2004)
Matt Guerrieri	Safeties	5th	Davidson (2011)
Re'quan Boyette	Running backs	4th	Duke (2009)
Jeffrey Faris	Wide Receivers	5th	Duke (2011)
Josh Grizzard	Offensive Graduate Assistant	4th	Yale (2012)
Eli Keimach	Offensive Graduate Assistant	3rd	Massachusetts (2014)
Clayton McGrath	Defensive tackles/Graduate Assistant	4th	Brown University (2011)
Sam McGrath	Defensive Graduate Assistant	2nd	Brown University (2012)
Patrick O'Connor	Defensive Quality Control	4th	Dickinson College (2010)

== Game summaries ==
=== North Carolina Central ===
	1	2	3	4	Total
Eagles	0	0	3	3	6
Blue Devils	21	28	0	0	49

=== Wake Forest ===
	1	2	3	4	Total
Demon Deacons	0	7	14	3	24
Blue Devils	7	0	7	0	14

=== At Northwestern ===
	1	2	3	4	Total
Blue Devils	0	7	0	6	13
Wildcats	7	0	10	7	24

=== At Notre Dame ===
	1	2	3	4	Total
Blue Devils	14	14	0	10	38
Fighting Irish	14	7	7	7	35

=== Virginia ===
	1	2	3	4	Total
Cavaliers	6	14	7	7	34
Blue Devils	7	3	3	7	20

=== Army ===
	1	2	3	4	Total
Black Knights	0	6	0	0	6
Blue Devils	7	6	0	0	13

=== At Louisville ===
	1	2	3	4	Total
Blue Devils	7	0	0	7	14
#7 Cardinals	7	3	7	7	24

=== At Georgia Tech ===
	1	2	3	4	Total
Blue Devils	0	7	21	7	35
Yellow Jackets	14	14	3	7	38

=== Virginia Tech ===
	1	2	3	4	Total
#23 Hokies	7	14	0	3	24
Blue Devils	7	0	7	7	21

=== North Carolina ===
	1	2	3	4	Total
#15 Tar Heels	14	7	6	0	27
Blue Devils	0	21	7	0	28

=== At Pittsburgh ===
	1	2	3	4	Total
Blue Devils	7	7	0	0	14
Panthers	14	14	14	14	56

=== At Miami (FL) ===
	1	2	3	4	Total
Blue Devils	7	7	0	7	21
Hurricanes	10	6	17	7	40

== Team players in the NFL ==
No Duke players were selected in the 2017 NFL draft.
