= 2018 Duke Blue Devils football team =

American college football season

2018 Duke Blue Devils football

Independence Bowl champion

Independence Bowl, W 56–27 vs. Temple
- Conference: Atlantic Coast Conference
- Coastal Division
- Record: 8–5 (3–5 ACC)
- Head coach: David Cutcliffe (11th season)
- Offensive coordinator: Zac Roper (3rd season)
- Offensive scheme: Multiple
- Co-defensive coordinators: Ben Albert (1st season); Matt Guerrieri (1st season)
- Base defense: 4–2–5
- MVP: Daniel Jones
- Captains: Joe Giles-Harris; Ben Humphreys; Daniel Jones; Johnathan Lloyd
- Home stadium: Wallace Wade Stadium

Uniform
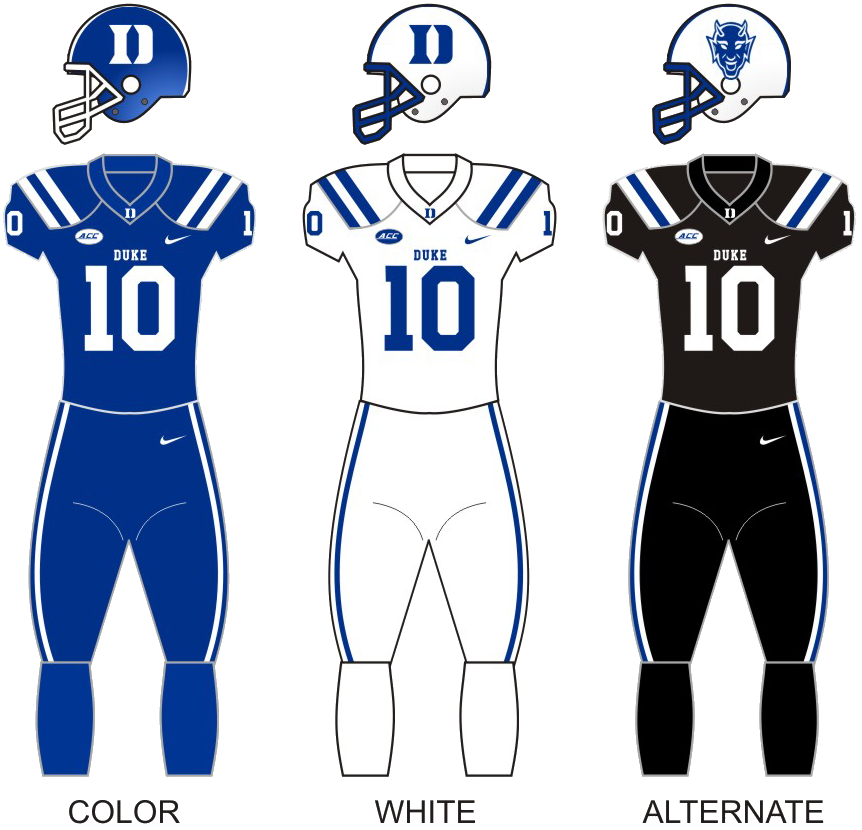

2018 Atlantic Coast Conference football standings
	Conf.			Overall
Team	W		L	W		L
Atlantic Division
No. 1 Clemson x$#^	8	–	0	15	–	0
No. 15 Syracuse	6	–	2	10	–	3
NC State	5	–	3	9	–	4
Boston College	4	–	4	7	–	5
Wake Forest	3	–	5	7	–	6
Florida State	3	–	5	5	–	7
Louisville	0	–	8	2	–	10
Coastal Division
Pittsburgh x	6	–	2	7	–	7
Georgia Tech	5	–	3	7	–	6
Miami (FL)	4	–	4	7	–	6
Virginia	4	–	4	8	–	5
Virginia Tech	4	–	4	6	–	7
Duke	3	–	5	8	–	5
North Carolina	1	–	7	2	–	9
Championship: Clemson 42, Pittsburgh 10
# – College Football Playoff champion; ^ – College Football Playoff participant; $ – Conference champion; x – Division champion/co-champions; Rankings from AP Poll

The 2018 Duke Blue Devils football team represented Duke University in the 2018 NCAA Division I FBS football season as a member of the Atlantic Coast Conference (ACC) in the Coastal Division. The team was led by head coach David Cutcliffe, in his 11th year, and played its home games at Wallace Wade Stadium in Durham, North Carolina. The Blue Devils finished the regular season with an 8–5 overall record. They went 3–5 in ACC play to finish in sixth place in the Coastal Division. They were invited to the Independence Bowl, where they defeated Temple.

== Recruiting ==
=== Position key ===
Back	B	Center	C	Cornerback	CB	Defensive back	DB
Defensive end	DE	Defensive lineman	DL	Defensive tackle	DT	End	E
Fullback	FB	Guard	G	Halfback	HB	Kicker	K
Kickoff returner	KR	Offensive tackle	OT	Offensive lineman	OL	Linebacker	LB
Long snapper	LS	Punter	P	Punt returner	PR	Quarterback	QB
Running back	RB	Safety	S	Tight end	TE	Wide receiver	WR

=== Recruits ===
The Blue Devils signed a total of 16 recruits.

College recruiting (2018)
Name	Hometown	School	Height	Weight	Commit date
Gunnar Holmberg; QB	Wake Forest, NC	Heritage High School	6 ft 3 in (1.91 m)	180 lb (82 kg)	Jul 7, 2016
Gunnar Holmberg; QB	Recruit ratings: Scout: Rivals: 247Sports: ESPN:				
Jake Bobo; WR	Belmont, MA	Belmont Hill School	6 ft 4 in (1.93 m)	185 lb (84 kg)	Feb 25, 2017
Jake Bobo; WR	Recruit ratings: Scout: Rivals: 247Sports: ESPN:				
Casey Holman; OT	Snellville, GA	Brookwood High School	6 ft 4 in (1.93 m)	285 lb (129 kg)	Mar 6, 2017
Casey Holman; OT	Recruit ratings: Scout: Rivals: 247Sports: ESPN:				
Tahj Rice; DT	Louisville, KY	Waggener High School	6 ft 2 in (1.88 m)	320 lb (150 kg)	Mar 14, 2017
Tahj Rice; DT	Recruit ratings: Scout: Rivals: 247Sports: ESPN:				
Zamari Ellis; TE	Henderson, NC	Southern Vance High School	6 ft 4 in (1.93 m)	240 lb (110 kg)	Apr 8, 2017
Zamari Ellis; TE	Recruit ratings: Scout: Rivals: 247Sports: ESPN:				
Rocky Shelton; LB	Fort Lauderdale, FL	St. Thomas Aquinas High School	6 ft 0 in (1.83 m)	205 lb (93 kg)	Apr 25, 2017
Rocky Shelton; LB	Recruit ratings: Scout: Rivals: 247Sports: ESPN:				
Jeremiah Lewis; CB	Plano, TX	Prestonwood Christian Academy	6 ft 0 in (1.83 m)	180 lb (82 kg)	May 7, 2017
Jeremiah Lewis; CB	Recruit ratings: Scout: Rivals: 247Sports: ESPN:				
Shaka Heyward; LB	Hoschton, GA	Mill Creek High School	6 ft 4 in (1.93 m)	215 lb (98 kg)	May 12, 2017
Shaka Heyward; LB	Recruit ratings: Scout: Rivals: 247Sports: ESPN:				
Dennis Smith; WR	Gaffney, SC	Gaffney High School	6 ft 2 in (1.88 m)	185 lb (84 kg)	May 14, 2017
Dennis Smith; WR	Recruit ratings: Scout: Rivals: 247Sports: ESPN:				
Jarett Garner; WR	Harrisburg, NC	Hickory Ridge High School	6 ft 3 in (1.91 m)	190 lb (86 kg)	Jun 8, 2017
Jarett Garner; WR	Recruit ratings: Scout: Rivals: 247Sports: ESPN:				
Maurice McIntyre; OG	Jacksonville, NC	Northside High School	6 ft 2 in (1.88 m)	320 lb (150 kg)	Jun 12, 2017
Maurice McIntyre; OG	Recruit ratings: Scout: Rivals: 247Sports: ESPN:				
Nate Thompson; S	Southern Lee High School	Sanford, NC	6 ft 3 in (1.91 m)	185 lb (84 kg)	Jul 5, 2017
Nate Thompson; S	Recruit ratings: Scout: Rivals: 247Sports: ESPN:				
Mataeo Durant; RB	McCormick, SC	McCormick High School	6 ft 1 in (1.85 m)	190 lb (86 kg)	Jul 8, 2017
Mataeo Durant; RB	Recruit ratings: Scout: Rivals: 247Sports: ESPN:				
Elijah Brown; DT	Charlotte, NC	Providence Day School	6 ft 4 in (1.93 m)	295 lb (134 kg)	Sep 9, 2017
Elijah Brown; DT	Recruit ratings: Scout: Rivals: 247Sports: ESPN:				
Peace Addo; OT	Baltimore, MD	St. Frances Academy	6 ft 6 in (1.98 m)	295 lb (134 kg)	Dec 16, 2017
Peace Addo; OT	Recruit ratings: Scout: Rivals: 247Sports: ESPN:				
Kendrick Torain; CB	Tampa, FL	Jesuit High School	6 ft 2 in (1.88 m)	195 lb (88 kg)	Feb 5, 2018
Kendrick Torain; CB	Recruit ratings: Scout: Rivals: 247Sports: ESPN:				
Overall recruit ranking:
Note: In many cases, Scout, Rivals, 247Sports, On3, and ESPN may conflict in their listings of height and weight.; In these cases, the average was taken. ESPN grades are on a 100-point scale.; Sources: "Duke Football Commitments". Rivals.; "2018 Team Ranking". Rivals.com.

== Preseason ==
=== Award watch lists ===
Listed in the order that they were released

Award	Player	Position	Year
Lott Trophy	Ben Humphries	LB	SR
Rimington Trophy	Zach Harmon	C	SR
Chuck Bednarik Award	Mark Gilbert	CB	JR
Chuck Bednarik Award	Joe Giles-Harris	LB	JR
Maxwell Award	Daniel Jones	QB	JR
Davey O'Brien Award	Daniel Jones	QB	JR
Doak Walker Award	Brittain Brown	RB	SO
Fred Biletnikoff Award	T. J. Rahming	WR	SR
John Mackey Award	Daniel Helm	TE	SR
Butkus Award	Joe Giles-Harris	LB	JR
Jim Thorpe Award	Mark Gilbert	CB	JR
Bronko Nagurski Trophy	Mark Gilbert	CB	JR
Bronko Nagurski Trophy	Joe Giles-Harris	LB	JR
Paul Hornung Award	Brittain Brown	RB/KR	SO
Wuerffel Trophy	Jonathan Lloyd	WR	SR
Walter Camp Award	Joe Gilles-Harris	LB	JR
Johnny Unitas Golden Arm Award	Daniel Jones	QB	JR
Manning Award	Daniel Jones	QB	JR

=== ACC media poll ===
The ACC media poll was released on July 24, 2018.

Media poll (Coastal)
Predicted finish	Team	Votes (1st place)
1	Miami	998 (122)
2	Virginia Tech	838 (16)
3	Georgia Tech	654 (8)
4	Duke	607 (1)
5	Pittsburgh	420
6	North Carolina	370 (1)
7	Virginia	257

== Schedule ==
Date	Time	Opponent	Rank	Site	TV	Result	Attendance
August 31	7:00 p.m.	Army*		Wallace Wade Stadium; Durham, NC	ESPNU	W 34–14	26,017
September 8	12:00 p.m.	at Northwestern*		Ryan Field; Evanston, IL	ESPNU	W 21–7	40,654
September 15	3:30 p.m.	at Baylor*		McLane Stadium; Waco, TX	FS1	W 40–27	40,442
September 22	3:30 p.m.	North Carolina Central*^{†}		Wallace Wade Stadium; Durham, NC	ACCN Extra	W 55–13	30,477
September 29	7:00 p.m.	Virginia Tech	No. 22	Wallace Wade Stadium; Durham, NC	ESPN2	L 14–31	32,177
October 13	12:20 p.m.	at Georgia Tech		Bobby Dodd Stadium; Atlanta, GA	ACCN	W 28–14	41,709
October 20	12:30 p.m.	Virginia		Wallace Wade Stadium; Durham, NC	ACCRSN	L 14–28	20,277
October 27	3:30 p.m.	at Pittsburgh		Heinz Field; Pittsburgh, PA	ACCRSN	L 45–54	31,510
November 3	7:00 p.m.	at Miami (FL)		Hard Rock Stadium; Miami Gardens, FL	ESPN2	W 20–12	62,754
November 10	12:20 p.m.	North Carolina		Wallace Wade Stadium; Durham, NC (Victory Bell)	ACCN	W 42–35	35,493
November 17	7:00 p.m.	at No. 2 Clemson		Memorial Stadium; Clemson, SC	ESPN	L 6–35	81,313
November 24	12:30 p.m.	Wake Forest		Wallace Wade Stadium; Durham, NC (rivalry)	ACCRSN	L 7–59	20,782
December 27	1:30 p.m.	vs. Temple*		Independence Stadium; Shreveport, LA (Independence Bowl)	ESPN	W 56–27	27,492
*Non-conference game; ^{†}Homecoming; Rankings from AP Poll released prior to the game; All times are in Eastern time

== Roster ==
2018 Duke Blue Devils football team roster
Players
Coaches
Offense

Pos.	#	Name	Class
QB	2	Daniel Karlin	So
WR	3	T. J. Rahming	Sr
QB	4	Robert Nelson	Fr
WR	5	Johnathan Lloyd	Sr
RB	6	Nicodem Pierre	Sr
WR	7	Keyston Fuller	Jr
WR	8	Aaron Young	Jr
WR	11	Scott Bracey	So
QB	12	Gunnar Holmberg	Fr
WR	14	Dennis Smith	Fr
QB	15	Chris Katrenick	Fr
QB	17	Daniel Jones	Jr
QB	18	Quentin Harris	Jr
WR	19	Jake Bobo	Fr
RB	20	Marvin Hubbard III	Fr
RB	21	Mataeo Durant	Fr
RB	22	Brittain Brown	So
RB	23	James Jackson IV	Fr
WR	24	Jarett Garner	Fr
RB	25	Deon Jackson	So
WR	26	Troy Duncan	So
RB	36	Elijah Deveaux	So
RB	45	Griffin Carter	Sr
WR	46	Joe Hardison	Fr
TE	46	Aaron Wright	So
RB	47	Ryan Wolitzer	Jr
C	50	Jack Wohlabaugh	So
C	55	Will Taylor	Fr
OT	60	Patrick Leitten	Fr
OT	61	Zach Thomson	Fr
G	63	Zach Harmon	Sr
G	64	Tristan Westover	So
G	65	Julian Santos	Jr
OT	66	Jaylen Miller	So
G	67	Rakavius Chambers	So
C	68	Clark Bulleit	Sr
G	69	Zach Baker	Jr
OT	70	Christian Harris	Sr
OL	71	Maurice McIntyre	Fr
OT	75	Liam Smith	So
OT	76	Peace Addo	Fr
OT	77	Robert Kraeling	So
G	78	Casey Holman	Fr
G	79	Jacob Rimmer	Fr
TE	80	Daniel Helm	Sr
TE	81	Davis Koppenhaver	Sr
WR	82	Chris Taylor	Sr
TE	83	Zamari Ellis	Fr
WR	84	Trevon Lee	Sr
WR	85	Damond Philyaw-Johnson	Fr
WR	86	D. J. Fullard	Fr
TE	87	Noah Gray	So
TE	88	Jake Marwede	Fr
TE	89	Mark Birmingham	So

Defense

Pos.	#	Name	Class
DT	1	Axel Nyembwe	So
S	2	Javon Jackson	So
CB	4	Myles Hudzick	So
S	9	Jeremy McDuffie	Sr
S	11	Gio Holmes-Garrido	Jr
S	10	Marquis Waters	So
CB	12	Mason Williams	Jr
S	13	Jordan Hayes	Jr
S	16	Dylan Singleton	Jr
S	23	Lummie Young IV	Fr
S	26	Michael Carter II	So
S	27	Damani Neal	Fr
CB	28	Mark Gilbert	Jr
S	29	Nate Thompson	Fr
S	30	Brandon Feamster	Jr
CB	31	Josh Blackwell	Fr
LB	32	Brandon Hill	So
S	33	Leonard Johnson	Fr
LB	34	Ben Humphreys	Sr
CB	35	Antone Williams	So
CB	37	Ken Torain	Fr
CB	39	Jeremiah Lewis	Fr
LB	40	Jacob Morganstern	So
LB	41	Xander Gagnon	So
LB	42	Shaka Heyward	Fr
LB	43	Rocky Shelton II	Fr
LB	44	Joe Giles-Harris	Jr
LB	49	Koby Quansah	Jr
DE	51	Victor Dimukeje	So
LB	52	Cole Carteaux	Fr
DT	53	Scott Jones	Fr
DT	53	Tahj Rice	Fr
LB	54	Kevin Gehsmann	Sr
DT	54	Derrick Tangelo	So
DT	56	Elijiah Brown	Fr
DE	59	Tre Hornbuckle	Jr
DE	60	Noah Waddell	Jr
DE	86	Drew Jordan	So
DE	90	Terrell Lucas	Jr
DT	92	Edgar Cerenord	Sr
DT	93	Ben Frye	Fr
DT	94	Twazanga Mugala	Jr
DT	95	Trevon McSwain	Jr
DE	96	Chris Rumph II	Fr
DE	98	Chidi Okonya	So

Special teams

Pos.	#	Name	Class
K	11	Tim Skapek	Jr
K	36	Matthew Cone	So
P	37	Jackson Hubbard	So
K	38	Jack Driggers	So
K/P	45	Austin Parker	Jr
K	48	A. J. Reed	So
LS	57	John Taylor	So
LS	58	Ben Wyatt	So
LS	62	Lee Rodio	Jr
K	94	Collin Wareham	Sr

Head coach

- David Cutcliffe

Coordinators/assistant coaches

- Zac Roper (offensive coordinator / quarterbacks)
- Derek Jones (Associate head coach / defensive backs)
- Ben Albert (co-defensive coordinator / defensive line)
- Matt Guerrieri (co-defensive coordinator / Defensive Secondary)
- Jim Bridge (offensive line)
- Jeff Faris (tight ends)
- Re'quan Boyette (running backs)
- Lanier Goethie (linebackers)
- Gerad Parker (wide receivers)
- Kirk Benedict (special teams)

Legend

- (C) Team captain
- (S) Suspended
- (I) Ineligible
- Injured
- Redshirt

Roster
Last update: August 25, 2018

== Game summaries ==
=== Army ===
	1	2	3	4	Total
Black Knights	0	0	14	0	14
Blue Devils	3	14	7	10	34

=== At Northwestern ===
	1	2	3	4	Total
Blue Devils	0	21	0	0	21
Wildcats	7	0	0	0	7

=== At Baylor ===
	1	2	3	4	Total
Blue Devils	7	16	7	10	40
Bears	0	0	13	14	27

=== North Carolina Central ===
	1	2	3	4	Total
Eagles	7	6	0	0	13
Blue Devils	20	7	21	7	55

=== Virginia Tech ===
	1	2	3	4	Total
Hokies	3	14	7	7	31
No. 22 Blue Devils	7	0	0	7	14

=== At Georgia Tech ===
	1	2	3	4	Total
Blue Devils	7	0	21	0	28
Yellow Jackets	0	7	0	7	14

=== Virginia ===
	1	2	3	4	Total
Cavaliers	7	7	6	8	28
Blue Devils	0	0	7	7	14

=== At Pittsburgh ===
	1	2	3	4	Total
Blue Devils	7	14	21	3	45
Panthers	7	10	18	19	54

=== At Miami (FL) ===
	1	2	3	4	Total
Blue Devils	7	0	10	3	20
Hurricanes	0	12	0	0	12

=== North Carolina ===
	1	2	3	4	Total
Tar Heels	14	14	0	7	35
Blue Devils	14	21	7	0	42

=== At Clemson ===
	1	2	3	4	Total
Blue Devils	6	0	0	0	6
No. 2 Tigers	0	14	14	7	35

=== Wake Forest ===
	1	2	3	4	Total
Demon Deacons	21	10	14	14	59
Blue Devils	0	7	0	0	7

=== Vs. Temple (Independence Bowl) ===
	1	2	3	4	Total
Owls	13	14	0	0	27
Blue Devils	7	14	21	14	56

== Rankings ==
Ranking movements Legend: ██ Increase in ranking ██ Decrease in ranking — = Not ranked RV = Received votes
	Week															
Poll	Pre	1	2	3	4	5	6	7	8	9	10	11	12	13	14	Final
AP	—	—	RV	RV	22	RV	—	RV	—	—	RV	RV	RV	—	—	
Coaches	RV	RV	RV	RV	23	RV	RV	RV	RV	RV	RV	RV	—	—	—	
CFP	Not released									—	—	—	—	—	—	Not released

== 2019 NFL draft ==
Player	Team	Round	Pick #	Position
Daniel Jones	New York Giants	1st	6	QB
