= List of Duke Blue Devils in the NFL draft =

This is a list of Duke Blue Devils football players in the NFL draft.

== Key ==
B	Back	K	Kicker	NT	Nose tackle
C	Center	LB	Linebacker	FB	Fullback
DB	Defensive back	P	Punter	HB	Halfback
DE	Defensive end	QB	Quarterback	WR	Wide receiver
DT	Defensive tackle	RB	Running back	G	Guard
E	End	T	Offensive tackle	TE	Tight end

== Selections ==
Year	Round	Pick	Overall	Player	Team	Position
1936	6	9	54	Gus Durner	New York Giants	T
1937	2	3	13	Ace Parker	Brooklyn Dodgers	QB
1938	6	5	45	Joe Brunansky	Chicago Cardinals	T
1938	12	8	108	Elmore Hackney	New York Giants	B
1939	8	5	65	Dan Hill	Brooklyn Dodgers	C
1939	12	8	108	Bob O'Mara	Washington Redskins	B
1939	15	8	138	Eric Tipton	Washington Redskins	B
1940	1	2	2	George McAfee	Philadelphia Eagles	RB
1940	4	4	29	Edgar Bailey	Brooklyn Dodgers	E
1940	12	8	108	Allen Johnson	Washington Redskins	G
1940	16	8	148	Willard Perdue	Washington Redskins	E
1940	18	6	166	Frank Ribar	Detroit Lions	G
1941	9	5	75	Jasper Davis	Detroit Lions	B
1941	16	2	142	Wes McAfee	Pittsburgh Steelers	B
1941	19	9	179	Alex Winterson	Chicago Bears	T
1942	1	4	4	Steve Lach	Chicago Cardinals	B
1942	7	8	58	Tommy Prothro	New York Giants	B
1942	9	6	76	Frank Swiger	Washington Redskins	B
1942	13	8	118	Bob Barnett	New York Giants	C
1943	9	3	73	Moffatt Storer	Chicago Cardinals	B
1944	3	9	25	Bob Gantt	Pittsburgh Steelers	E
1944	10	5	92	Ernie Beamer	New York Giants	E
1944	15	8	150	Bill Milner	Chicago Bears	G
1944	17	7	171	Tom Davis	Washington Redskins	B
1944	23	6	236	John Wesley Perry	Green Bay Packers	B
1944	24	1	242	Bob Nanni	Chicago Cardinals	T
1945	13	1	121	Elmore Luper	Chicago Cardinals	B
1945	15	2	144	Gordon Carver	Chicago Cardinals	B
1945	17	3	167	Ben Cittadino	Chicago Cardinals	E
1945	27	3	277	Glen Stough	Pittsburgh Steelers	T
1945	28	1	286	Garland Williams	Chicago Cardinals	T
1945	29	6	302	Frank Irwin	Washington Redskins	T
1946	2	3	13	George Clark	Pittsburgh Steelers	B
1946	4	4	29	Ernie Knotts	Chicago Bears	G
1946	12	5	105	Al Bush	New York Giants	T
1946	16	7	147	Kelly Mote	Detroit Lions	E
1946	18	1	161	Frank Irwin	Chicago Cardinals	T
1946	21	10	200	Cliff Lewis	Los Angeles Rams	B
1946	23	3	213	Bill Leitheiser	Pittsburgh Steelers	G
1946	24	2	222	Mike Karmazin	Boston Yanks	E
1946	29	5	275	Steve Lucas	New York Giants	E
1946	30	1	281	Jim LaRue	Chicago Cardinals	B
1947	14	2	117	Leo Long	Boston Yanks	B
1947	15	6	131	Buddy Mulligan	Chicago Cardinals	B
1947	25	3	228	Hal Mullins	Washington Redskins	T
1948	20	9	184	Fred Folger	Pittsburgh Steelers	B
1948	28	8	263	Fred Hardison	Chicago Bears	E
1949	2	3	14	Al DeRogatis	New York Giants	T
1949	10	1	92	Bill Davis	Detroit Lions	G
1949	20	6	197	Lloyd Eisenberg	Los Angeles Rams	T
1949	21	7	208	Tommy Hughes	Washington Redskins	B
1949	21	8	209	Jim Duncan	Chicago Bears	E
1950	5	7	60	Lou Allen	Pittsburgh Steelers	T
1951	8	1	87	Bill Cox	Washington Redskins	B
1951	24	3	282	Tom Powers	Washington Redskins	B
1952	19	9	226	Blaine Earon	Detroit Lions	E
1952	23	10	275	Bob Bickel	New York Giants	B
1953	12	4	137	Jim Lawrence	Chicago Bears	T
1953	12	7	140	Carson Leach	San Francisco 49ers	G
1953	17	12	205	Ray Green	Detroit Lions	T
1953	18	5	210	Carl Holben	Pittsburgh Steelers	T
1953	22	10	263	Byrd Looper	Cleveland Browns	B
1953	24	12	289	Truett Grant	Detroit Lions	T
1953	30	5	354	Lou Tepe	Pittsburgh Steelers	C
1954	3	5	30	Ed Meadows	Chicago Bears	T
1954	12	1	134	Howard Pitt	Chicago Cardinals	E
1954	21	12	253	Jack Kistler	Detroit Lions	B
1954	22	11	264	Lloyd Caudle	Cleveland Browns	B
1954	24	12	289	Bobby Burrows	Detroit Lions	G
1955	14	8	165	Nick McKeithan	San Francisco 49ers	B
1955	18	1	206	Fred Campbell	Chicago Cardinals	T
1955	23	10	275	Jerry Barger	Chicago Bears	B
1956	3	8	33	Bob Pascal	Baltimore Colts	B
1956	14	1	158	Ronnie Falls	Detroit Lions	LB
1956	23	7	272	Jesse Birchfield	Green Bay Packers	G
1956	29	8	345	Jim Nelson	New York Giants	G
1957	4	6	43	Sonny Jurgensen	Philadelphia Eagles	QB
1957	8	1	86	Hal McElhaney	Philadelphia Eagles	B
1957	8	3	88	Roy Hord Jr.	Los Angeles Rams	T
1957	20	7	236	Sid DeLoatch	San Francisco 49ers	G
1957	23	9	274	Milt Konicek	Chicago Cardinals	T
1957	26	2	303	Buddy Bass	Green Bay Packers	E
1957	26	7	308	Tom Topping	San Francisco 49ers	T
1958	3	9	34	Buzz Guy	Cleveland Browns	T
1958	6	3	64	John Kersey	Philadelphia Eagles	T
1958	8	11	96	Bert Lattimore	Cleveland Browns	E
1958	12	11	144	Bob Brodhead	Cleveland Browns	QB
1958	17	8	201	Jack Harrison	New York Giants	C
1958	18	4	209	Phil Dupler	Chicago Bears	B
1958	22	7	260	Bill Thompson	Pittsburgh Steelers	E
1958	29	9	346	Doug Padgett	Baltimore Colts	E
1959	3	2	26	Wray Carlton	Philadelphia Eagles	B
1959	16	9	189	Ted Royal	Los Angeles Rams	C
1959	23	10	274	Jim Gardner	Cleveland Browns	T
1959	29	5	341	Dave Sime	Detroit Lions	E
1960	2	2	14	Mike McGee	St. Louis Cardinals	G
1960	9	4	100	Dwight Bumgamer	Washington Redskins	E
1960	13	7	151	Bob Spada	Chicago Bears	E
1961	9	3	115	Joel Arrington	Washington Redskins	B
1961	13	13	181	Jack Wilson	Cleveland Browns	B
1961	18	8	246	Art Browning	St. Louis Cardinals	G
1962	9	9	121	Walt Rappold	Baltimore Colts	QB
1963	12	3	157	Chuck Walker	St. Louis Cardinals	G
1964	9	14	126	Jay Wilkinson	Chicago Bears	RB
1965	1	14	14	Mike Curtis	Baltimore Colts	LB
1965	10	12	138	Chuck Drulis	St. Louis Cardinals	E
1965	13	6	174	Biff Bracy	Washington Redskins	RB
1965	17	11	235	Sonny Odom	Detroit Lions	RB
1966	6	14	94	Earl Yates	Washington Redskins	T
1966	16	15	245	Rod Stewart	Baltimore Colts	E
1967	1	18	18	Bob Matheson	Cleveland Browns	LB
1967	2	15	41	Dave Dunaway	Green Bay Packers	WR
1968	7	26	191	Andy Beath	Green Bay Packers	DB
1969	2	26	52	Al Woodall	New York Jets	QB
1969	17	26	442	Fred Zirkie	New York Jets	DT
1970	11	14	274	Robert Morris	Houston Oilers	C
1971	3	7	59	Leo Hart	Atlanta Falcons	QB
1971	5	15	119	Phil Asack	San Diego Chargers	DE
1971	7	7	163	Wes Chesson	Atlanta Falcons	WR
1972	7	8	164	Ernie Jackson	New Orleans Saints	DB
1973	5	11	115	Steve Jones	Los Angeles Rams	RB
1973	6	26	156	Ed Newman	Miami Dolphins	G
1973	13	13	325	Robert Parrish	New York Jets	DT
1973	15	7	371	Melvin Parker	St. Louis Cardinals	LB
1974	12	5	291	John Riccz	New York Jets	DE
1975	8	19	201	John Hill	Buffalo Bills	DT
1977	4	17	101	Billy Bryan	Denver Broncos	C
1977	6	3	142	Tony Benjamin	Seattle Seahawks	RB
1977	7	4	171	Bob Grupp	New York Jets	DB
1978	3	8	64	Lyman Smith	Miami Dolphins	DT
1979	9	14	234	Carl McGee	Cleveland Browns	LB
1982	3	1	56	Cedric Jones	New England Patriots	WR
1982	4	25	108	Charles Bowser	Miami Dolphins	LB
1982	5	23	134	Dennis Tabron	Chicago Bears	DB
1983	5	11	123	Chris Castor	Seattle Seahawks	WR
1984	6	8	148	Ben Bennett	Atlanta Falcons	QB
1987	1	5	5	Mike Junkin	Cleveland Browns	LB
1988	12	23	328	Steve Slayden	Cleveland Browns	QB
1989	3	18	74	Anthony Dilweg	Green Bay Packers	QB
1990	9	18	238	Clarkston Hines	Buffalo Bills	WR
1990	12	16	320	Chris Port	New Orleans Saints	G
1992	1	0	0	Dave Brown	New York Giants	QB
1996	4	26	121	Ray Farmer	Philadelphia Eagles	DB
1996	6	36	203	Spence Fischer	Pittsburgh Steelers	QB
1996	7	14	223	Jon Merrill	Minnesota Vikings	T
1998	6	36	189	Patrick Mannelly	Chicago Bears	G
1999	2	30	61	Lennie Friedman	Denver Broncos	C
2000	6	7	173	Chris Combs	Pittsburgh Steelers	DE
2004	7	2	203	Drew Strojny	New York Giants	T
2013	7	43	249	Sean Renfree	Atlanta Falcons	QB
2014	4	9	109	Ross Cockrell	Buffalo Bills	DB
2015	1	28	28	Laken Tomlinson	Detroit Lions	G
2015	4	6	105	Jamison Crowder	Washington Redskins	WR
2019	1	6	6	Daniel Jones	New York Giants	QB
2021	4	13	118	Chris Rumph II	Los Angeles Chargers	LB
2021	5	10	154	Michael Carter II	New York Jets	DB
2021	5	18	162	Noah Gray	Kansas City Chiefs	TE
2021	6	26	210	Victor Dimukeje	Arizona Cardinals	DE
2024	1	26	26	Graham Barton	Tampa Bay Buccaneers	C
2024	3	31	95	DeWayne Carter	Buffalo Bills	DT
2024	5	28	163	Jacob Monk	Green Bay Packers	C
2026	4	19	119	Wesley Williams	Jacksonville Jaguars	DE
2026	5	22	162	Chandler Rivers	Baltimore Ravens	DE
2026	6	8	189	Brian Parker II	Cincinnati Bengals	C

== Notable undrafted players ==
Note: No drafts held before 1920

Year	Player	Position	Debut Team	Notes
1968	Jay Calabrese	FB	Pittsburgh Steelers	—
1975	Robert Jackson	G	Cleveland Browns	—
1980	Joel Patten	T	Cleveland Browns	—
1982	Brian Baldinger	G	Dallas Cowboys	—
1991	Billy Ray	QB	Green Bay Packers	—
1993	Randy Cuthbert	RB	Pittsburgh Steelers	—
1995	John Farquhar	TE	Denver Broncos	—
1996	Bernard Holsey	DT	New York Giants	—
1997	Billy Granville	LB	Cincinnati Bengals	—
1998	Tawambi Settles	CB	Detroit Lions	—
1998	Corey Thomas	WR	Detroit Lions	—
2000	Kevin Lewis	LB	New York Giants	—
2000	Scottie Montgomery	WR	Denver Broncos	—
2004	Ryan Fowler	LB	Dallas Cowboys	—
2008	Patrick Bailey	LB	Pittsburgh Steelers	—
2009	Eron Riley	WR	Baltimore Ravens	—
2009	Michael Tauiliili	LB	Indianapolis Colts	—
2010	Thaddeus Lewis	QB	St. Louis Rams	—
2010	Vincent Rey	LB	Cincinnati Bengals	—
2012	Matt Daniels	CB	St. Louis Rams	—
2012	Cooper Helfet	TE	Seattle Seahawks	—
2016	Max McCaffrey	WR	Oakland Raiders	—
2016	Lucas Patrick	G	Green Bay Packers	—
2016	Matt Skura	C	Baltimore Ravens	—
2017	Breon Borders	CB	Buffalo Bills	—
2017	Thomas Hennessy	LS	Indianapolis Colts	—
2018	Austin Davis	C	Green Bay Packers	—
2018	Shaun Wilson	RB	Tampa Bay Buccaneers	—
2019	Joe Giles-Harris	LB	Jacksonville Jaguars	—
2019	Daniel Helm	TE	San Francisco 49ers	—
2019	Davis Koppenhaver	TE	Green Bay Packers	—
2021	Mark Gilbert	CB	Pittsburgh Steelers	—
2021	Deon Jackson	RB	Indianapolis Colts	—
2022	Josh Blackwell	CB	Philadelphia Eagles	—
2024	Jalon Calhoun	WR	Detroit Lions	—
2025	Dorian Mausi	LB	Minnesota Vikings	—
2025	Jordan Moore	WR	Cincinnati Bengals	—
2025	Eli Pancol	WR	Jacksonville Jaguars	—
2026	Aaron Hall	DT	Carolina Panthers	—
