= Re'quan Boyette =

American college football coach (born 1986)

Current position
- Title: Running backs coach
- Team: Troy
- Conference: Sun Belt

Biographical details
- Born: November 16, 1986 (age 39); Wilson, North Carolina, U.S.
- Education: Duke University (B.A.)

Playing career
- 2005–2009: Duke
- Position: Running back

Coaching career (HC unless noted)
- 2012: Duke (GA)
- 2013–20: Duke (RB)
- 2021: Duke (co-OC/WR)
- 2022: East Carolina (outside WR)
- 2023: East Carolina (RB)
- 2024–present: Troy (RB)

Re'quan Boyette (born November 16, 1986) is an American college football coach and former player. He is the running backs coach for Troy University, a position he has held since 2024. A Duke graduate, Boyette lettered for five years as a running back for the Blue Devils from 2005 to 2009, and has spent 10 years on the Duke coaching staff, before stops at East Carolina and Troy.

== Playing career ==
Boyette spent five years as a member of the Duke Blue Devils football program, lettering each year from 2005 to 2009. He led the team in rushing in 2006 and 2007, but was sidelined in 2008 due to an injury. Despite this, he was still voted a team captain for that season, and was voted to the same honor the following season.

In October 2008, Boyette was selected to the American Football Coaches Association Good Works Team, which recognizes players for their volunteer community service. He was the second Duke player to be named to the team, and was recognized at a ceremony held during the Sugar Bowl in New Orleans.

== Coaching career ==
Boyette joined the Duke coaching staff in 2012 as a graduate assistant before being promoted to running backs coach for the 2013 season. In his eight years in this position, he coached players including Juwan Thompson, Shaun Wilson, Mataeo Durant, and Deon Jackson. Boyette's players broke multiple school records under his tenure; Wilson set a single-game rushing record in 2014 and Jackson broke the all-purpose yardage record in 2018.

Prior to the start of the 2021 season, Boyette was promoted to co-offensive coordinator, alongside Jeff Faris, and was given the role of wide receivers coach as well. However, upon David Cutcliffe's departure from Duke, Boyette would take a job as an assistant coach at East Carolina, where he has coached both outside wide receivers as well as running backs under coach Mike Houston.

== Personal life ==
Boyette graduated from Duke University in 2009 with a Bachelor of Arts in sociology. He is married to Khristen, with whom he has one child.
