= History of Duke Blue Devils football =

The history of Duke Blue Devils football began in 1888, when Duke University first fielded a football team.

== History ==
=== Early history (1888–1930) ===
John Franklin Crowell, Duke football's first head coach

The Duke Blue Devils, then known as the Trinity Blue and White, first fielded a football team in 1888, coached by John Franklin Crowell. The first game against North Carolina was the first "scientific" game in the state. Trinity finished the first two seasons in their football history with records of 2–1 in 1888 and 1–1 in 1889. From 1890 to 1895, Trinity competed without a head coach. The 1891 team went undefeated. Trinity did not compete in football from 1895 to 1919. The Trinity Blue and White resumed football competition in 1920 under head coach Floyd J. Egan, compiling a record of 4–0–1 that season. In 1921, they finished 6–1–2 were led by James A. Baldwin, previously the head coach at Maine.

In February 1922, Herman Steiner was selected as the head coach of the Trinity College football team for the 1922 season. During the 1922 football season, Steiner coached the Trinity football team to a 7–2–1 record as the team outscored its opponents 156–57. E. L. Alexander took over the reins of the Trinity Blue Devils in 1923 and led the team to a 5–4 record. In their first season competing as Duke University, Howard Jones took over in 1924 and led the Blue Devils to a 4–5 record before leaving for USC. Former Indiana head coach James Herron led the Blue Devils to another 4–5 record in 1925. From 1926 to 1930, the program was led by head coach James DeHart, who compiled a 24–23–2 record during his tenure. DeHart led the Blue Devils, an independent for all of its history up to that point, into the Southern Conference in 1928.

=== Wallace Wade era (1931–1950) ===
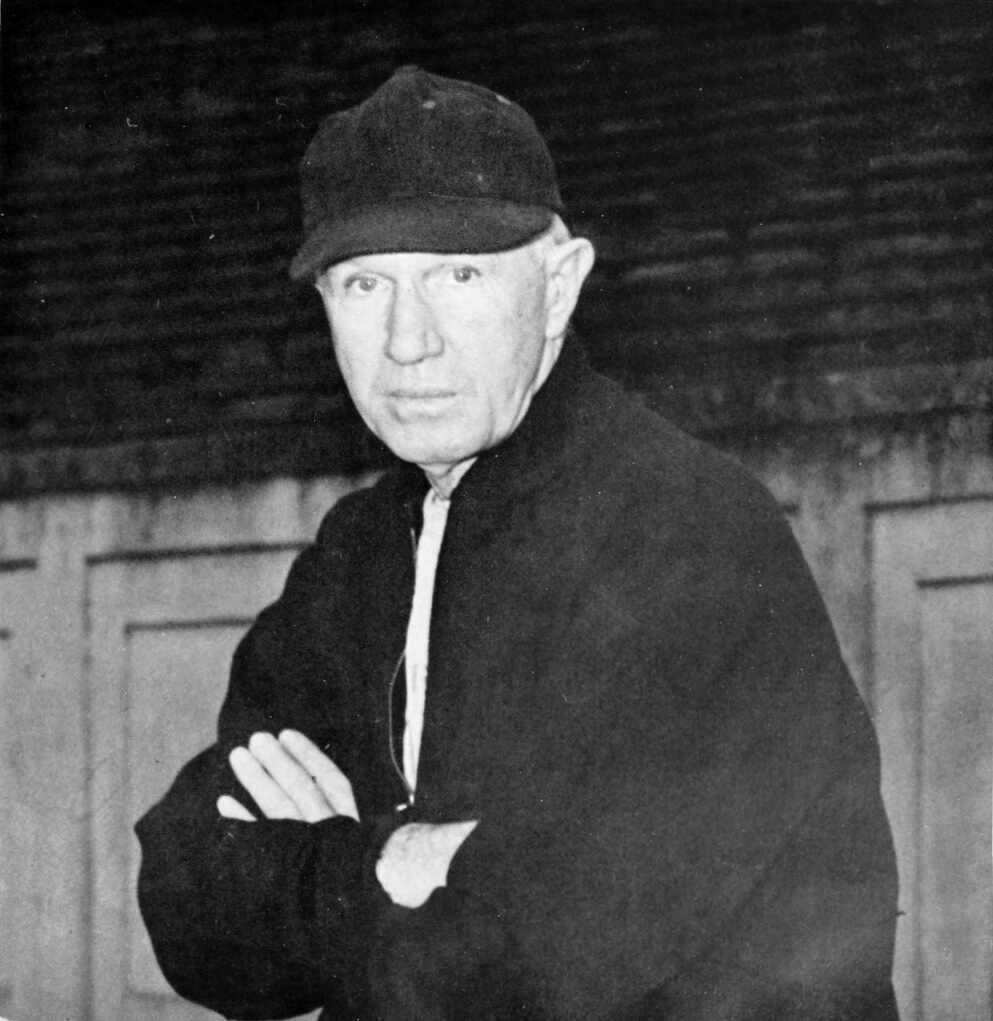
Wade circa 1950

In late 1930, Wallace Wade shocked the college football world by leaving national powerhouse Alabama for Duke. He had been at Alabama since 1923, after assisting Dan McGugin's Vanderbilt Commodores during two undefeated southern championships. An upset by the Florida Gators in 1923 is all that stopped Alabama from a conference title in Wade's first year. In 1924 he won the SoCon title, and in 1925 and 1926 won national championships. His 1925 team was the first Southern team to win a Rose Bowl. Wade was under fire at Alabama after lackluster seasons in 1928 and 1929, which included narrow losses to Robert Neyland's Tennessee Volunteers. Wade submitted his resignation on April 30, with the caveat that he coach next season. John Suther described the feeling before the Tennessee game that year, which Alabama won 18–6. "Coach Wade was boiling mad. He was like a blood-thirsty drill sergeant anyway, and those critics made him more fiery ... He challenged us to help him shut up the loudmouths that were making his life miserable." In his final year at Alabama, Wade won his third national championship. Though Wade refused to answer questions regarding his decision to leave Alabama for Duke until late in his life, he eventually told a sports historian he believed his philosophy regarding sports and athletics fit perfectly with the philosophy of the Duke administration and that he felt being at a private institution would allow him greater freedom. Wade's success at Alabama translated well to Duke's program. He sent former Alabama players and future Duke assistants Herschel Caldwell and Ellis Hagler to the school a year early to prepare a team. Duke won 7 Southern Conference championships in the 16 years that Wade was coach. He also led the team to 2 Rose Bowls. Wade served a stint in the military in World War II, leaving the team after the 1941 season and returning before the start of the 1946 season. Wade's achievements placed him in the College Football Hall of Fame.

In 1933, Duke, led by North Carolina's first first-team All-American Fred Crawford, upset Neyland's Tennessee Volunteers by a score of 10–2. It was Tennessee's first loss in over two and a half seasons. It caused Neyland to say of Crawford: "He gave the finest exhibition of tackle play I have ever seen." The most famous Duke football season came in 1938, when the "Iron Dukes" went unscored upon for the entire regular season. Duke reached their first Rose Bowl appearance, where they lost 7–3 when USC scored a touchdown in the final minute of the game on a pass from a second-string quarterback to a third string tight end.

While Wallace Wade was serving in the military, Duke football assistant coach Eddie Cameron was promoted to head coach to fill in for Wade until his return from service. Cameron's Blue Devils teams were successful, going 25–11–1 in Cameron's four seasons as head coach, highlighted by an 8–1 1943 season. Cameron's 1944 team won the Sugar Bowl, beating Alabama 29–26. Cameron would go on to serve as Duke's athletic director from 1951 to 1972, and for his service to the athletics program and the university as a whole, Duke named their basketball arena after him, Cameron Indoor Stadium, where the Blue Devils basketball teams still play their home games today.

Duke would be invited again to make the trip to Pasadena, California for the 1942 Rose Bowl, this time to play Oregon State. Due to fears of additional west coast attacks by the Japanese in the wake of Pearl Harbor, the decision was made to move the game to Durham. As Duke's stadium was significantly smaller than the regular venue, bleachers were borrowed from North Carolina State University and the University of North Carolina, which boosted capacity from 35,000 to 55,000. Despite being 3 to 1 favorites, the Iron Dukes would lose the game 20–16. Wade retired after the 1950 season and, for his great achievements, Duke named their football stadium after him. The Blue Devils still play their home games at Wallace Wade Stadium. Wade's final record at Duke is 110–36–7.

=== Bill Murray era (1951–1965) ===
Delaware head coach Bill Murray was chosen to replace Wallace Wade as Duke's head coach in 1951. The football program proved successful under Murray's tutelage, winning six of the first ten ACC football championships from 1953 to 1962. From 1943 until 1957, the Blue Devils were ranked in the AP Poll at some point in the season. Murray's Duke teams would be last successes the Blue Devils football program would have for another two decades. Bill Murray would be the last Duke head football coach to leave the Blue Devils with a winning record until Steve Spurrier, and the last to leave Duke after having won multiple conference championships. After Murray's retirement following the 1965 season, Duke's football program would steadily decline into becoming the ACC's "cellar-dweller". Murray led Duke to its last bowl appearance and conference championships, shared or outright, until 1989. Murray's final record at Duke was 91–51–9 in 15 seasons.

Murray led the Blue Devils to a 5–4–1 record in his first season. The 1951 campaign began with a wins over South Carolina and Pittsburgh. The game against Pittsburgh, was broadcast by NBC, and was the first nationally televised sporting event in American history. After losing to No. 16 Tennessee, the Blue Devils won their next two over NC State and Virginia Tech. Murray's squad then lost to Virginia, tied #5 Georgia Tech, lost to Wake Forest, lost to William & Mary and beat North Carolina. In 1952, in what was their last season as members of the Southern Conference, Duke went 8–2. The Blue Devils started the season by defeating Washington & Lee, SMU, #11 Tennessee, South Carolina, NC State and #9 Virginia. The Blue Devils suffered their first loss of the season in their seventh game of the season against Georgia Tech and lost again the next week to Navy. Murray's team closed the season with wins over Wake Forest and North Carolina. The Blue Devils were awarded the Southern Conference championship in their last season as members of the conference. Duke, along with the University of North Carolina, University of Virginia, North Carolina State University, Wake Forest University, Clemson University, the University of South Carolina and the University of Maryland chartered the Atlantic Coast Conference on May 8, 1953. In 1953, Duke finished its football season with a 7–2–1 record. The Blue Devils, who began the season ranked No. 10 in the country, started with wins over South Carolina, Wake Forest, Tennessee and Purdue. After losing a thriller to Army, The Blue Devils blew out NC State and Virginia. The Blue Devils then tied Navy in a scoreless bout. Murray's Duke team closed the 1953 season with a 13–10 loss to No. 12 Georgia Tech and a 35–20 win over archrival North Carolina. The Blue Devils won the first ever ACC football championship in 1953. The Blue Devils compiled an 8–2–1 record in 1954. Beginning the season ranked No. 19 nationally, the Blue Devils annihilated Pennsylvania by a score of 52–0 and defeated Tennessee in a thriller by a score of 7–6 to start the season at 2–0. The Blue Devils then tied #5 Purdue and lost to No. 18 Army. The Blue Devils won their next two over NC State and Georgia Tech, scoring 21 points in both games. After losing to No. 19 Navy, the Blue Devils won their last four of the season; defeating Wake Forest by a score of 28–21, South Carolina by a score of 26–7, North Carolina by a score of 47–12 and Nebraska in the Orange Bowl by a score of 34–7, the Blue Devils' first bowl appearance since 1945. For the second straight year, Duke won the ACC conference championship. The Blue Devils finished 7–2–1 in 1955. Murray's team began the season 4–0 with wins over NC State, Tennessee, William & Mary and #14 Ohio State. Duke lost its next two to Pittsburgh and #12 Georgia Tech. After tying #9 Navy, The Blue Devils capped the season with wins over South Carolina, Wake Forest and North Carolina. The Blue Devils were awarded their third straight ACC championship in 1955.

In 1956, Duke finished 5–4–1. The Blue Devils lost to South Carolina to kick off the season. Duke then defeated Virginia by a score of 40–7 to record its first win of the season. After losing to No. 9 Tennessee, Duke defeated #19 SMU by a score of 14–6. Duke then lost to No. 16 Pittsburgh by a score of 27–14. After shutting out NC State by a score of 42–0, Murray's squad lost by a score of 7–0 to No. 2 Georgia Tech. Duke finished the season by tying Navy, defeating Wake Forest and defeating North Carolina. Murray led the Blue Devils to a 6–3–2 record in 1957. Duke won its first five to start the season; topping South Carolina, Virginia, Maryland, #15 Rice and Wake Forest. Murray's team then tied NC State, lost to Georgia Tech and tied #7 Navy. After defeating #14 Clemson, Duke lost to North Carolina in the regular season finale by a score of 21–13. ranked No. 11 nationally, Duke received a berth in the Orange Bowl, losing to No. 4 Oklahoma by a score of 48–21. The Blue Devils went 5–5 in 1958. They lost their first two games of the season to South Carolina and Virginia. Duke then won their next two; defeating Illinois and Baylor. After losing to No. 12 Notre Dame, Murray's men beat NC State by a score of 20–13. Next, Duke dropped consecutive games to Georgia Tech by a score of 10–8 and #1 LSU by a score of 50–18. Duke finished by winning their last two over Wake Forest and #17 North Carolina. Duke went 4–6 in 1959. Out of the gate, the Durham Dukies lost their first two to No. 14 South Carolina and #12 Ohio State. After defeating Rice by a score of 24–7, the Blue Devils dropped their next two to Pittsburgh and Army. Duke won their next two over NC State and #9 Georgia Tech. After losing to No. 10 Clemson, Duke closed the disappointing season with a 27–15 victory over Wake Forest and a blowout loss to North Carolina by a score of 50–0. The Blue Devils improved to 8–3 in 1960. Murray led his team to victory in the season's first two games over South Carolina and Maryland. After losing to Michigan, the Blue Devils won their next five; defeating NC State, Clemson, Georgia Tech, #4 Navy and Wake Forest. After dropping their last two regular season games to North Carolina and UCLA, Duke, ranked No. 11, defeated #7 Arkansas by a score of 7–6 in the Cotton Bowl. The Blue Devils won the ACC Championship that season. After defeating the Razorbacks in Dallas, it would be over a half century until the Blue Devils won another bowl game.

Duke compiled a 7–3 record in 1961. Murray's team began the season with wins over South Carolina, Virginia and Wake Forest. The Blue Devils then lost their next two to Georgia Tech and Clemson. The Blue Devils then defeated NC State by a score of 17–6. After losing to Michigan the following week, Duke finished the season on a three-game winning streak; beating Navy, North Carolina and Notre Dame. Murray and his squad were awarded a second straight ACC championship in 1961, the fifth during Murray's tenure as head coach. The Blue Devils went 8–2 in 1962. Beginning the season ranked No. 8 nationally, the Blue Devils lost their season opener to USC by a score of 14–7 in their first meeting with the Trojans since the 1939 Rose Bowl. Duke rebounded to win their next five; topping South Carolina, Florida, California, Clemson and NC State. After losing to Georgia Tech by a score of 20–9, the Blue Devils won their last three to finish the season; beating Maryland by a score of 10–7, Wake Forest by a lopsided 50–0 (Duke's largest margin of victory over a conference opponent in its history) and North Carolina by a score of 16–14. Duke won its third straight ACC championship in 1962, their sixth under Murray. Duke compiled a 5–4–1 record in 1963. Beating South Carolina, Virginia and Maryland to kick off the season; the Blue Devils tied California in the season's fourth game. Despite defeating Clemson 35–30 the next week, the Blue Devils dropped two in a row after the Clemson win to NC State and Georgia Tech. Duke then defeated Wake Forest by a score of 39–7 during which Duke's defense set the school record for most interceptions in one game. The Blue Devils finished the season with losses to No. 2 Navy and North Carolina on Thanksgiving. Murray led Duke to a 4–5–1 record in 1964. After tying South Carolina in the season opener, the Blue Devils reeled off four straight wins; topping Virginia, Maryland, NC State and Army. However, Duke finished the season on a five-game losing streak; dropping contests to No. 8 Georgia Tech, Wake Forest (the Blue Devils' first loss to the Demon Deacons in 13 years), Navy, North Carolina and Tulane. Bill Murray's last season in 1965 resulted in a 6–4 mark. The Blue Devils began the year on a high note, winning their first four over Virginia, South Carolina, Rice and Pittsburgh. Like the season before, the Blue Devils suffered through a multi-game losing streak, this time a four-game skid; beginning with Clemson in an ugly 3–2 defensive struggle. Losses to Illinois, Georgia Tech and NC State. The Blue Devils finished the 1965 campaign with wins over Wake Forest and North Carolina.

=== Tom Harp era (1966–1970) ===
After Murray came Tom Harp, who had a 22–28–1 record in 5 seasons with the Blue Devils. A very successful high school coach, Harp came to Duke after a mediocre stint as Cornell's head football coach. Harp's teams struggled on the field, only producing one winning season, a 6–5 1970 season that would be Harp's last at Duke, as he was fired following the season.

In 1966, the Blue Devils finished 5–5. The Blue Devils began the season on a three-game winning streak; defeating West Virginia, Pittsburgh and Virginia. The Blue Devils would then drop their next four; losing to Maryland, Clemson, NC State and #6 Georgia Tech. After defeating Navy, the Blue Devils traveled to South Bend, Indiana for a showdown against #1 Notre Dame. The Blue Devils lost by a score of 64–0. The Blue Devils would close the season with a win over archrival North Carolina. In 1967, the Blue Devils finished 4–6. After defeating Wake Forest in the season opener, Duke lost to Michigan by a score of 10–7. After losing to South Carolina, the Blue Devils defeated Army and Virginia. Duke then lost its next three to Clemson, #5 NC State and Georgia Tech. After defeating Navy in Norfolk, Virginia, the Blue Devils would close the season with a 20–9 loss to North Carolina.

Harp led the Blue Devils to another 4–6 record in 1968. Duke began the season with a victory over South Carolina in the season opener. Michigan defeated Duke in the second game of the season by a score of 31–10. Next, Duke beat Maryland by a score of 30–28. The Blue Devils then lost their next three; to Virginia, Clemson and Army. Duke then defeated Georgia Tech, lost to NC State, defeated Wake Forest and lost to North Carolina. In 1969, Duke went 3–6–1. The Blue Devils began the season with three straight losses; first to South Carolina by a score of 27–20, then to Virginia by a score of 10–0 and to Pittsburgh by a score of 14–12. After defeating Wake Forest, Duke lost to Maryland and tied NC State. After losing to Georgia Tech, the Blue Devils defeated Clemson, lost to Virginia Tech and beat North Carolina. In 1970, Duke finished 6–5. Duke travelled to Gainesville, Florida to face #15 Florida to kick off the season. The Blue Devils lost by a score of 21–19. Next, Duke defeated Maryland and Virginia before travelling to Columbus, Ohio for a showdown against #1 Ohio State, a game the Blue Devils lost by a score of 34–10. The following week, Duke upset #11 West Virginia and followed that with wins over NC State and Clemson. After losing their next two to Georgia Tech and Wake Forest the Blue Devils defeated South Carolina and lost to North Carolina.

=== Mike McGee era (1971–1978) ===
Mike McGee returned to his alma mater from East Carolina to serve as head football coach in late 1970. Duke continued in the mediocrity and sub-par on-the-field performances that had been seen under Harp, going 37–47–4 overall. McGee's two best years were 1971 and 1974, in which his Duke teams went a mediocre 6–5. McGee was dismissed after the 1978 season.

McGee led the Blue Devils to a 6–5 record in his first season. Duke began the season strong, winning its first four and five of its first six. Future NFL offensive linesman Ed Newman played as an offensive lineman and defensive lineman, and was a Football All-American in 1971 and a Football All-ACC in 1971 and 1972. However, Duke would lose to Navy and Georgia Tech in consecutive weeks before getting what would be its final win of the season against West Virginia. McGee's Blue Devils lost its last two games of the season to Wake Forest and North Carolina. In 1972, Duke finished 5–6. Duke began the season with losses to No. 7 Alabama, #12 Washington and #19 Stanford. After defeating Virginia, the Blue Devils lost to NC State. Duke then won its next four, defeating Clemson, Maryland, Navy and Georgia Tech. The Duke Blue Devils lost its last two games of the season to Wake Forest and #16 North Carolina. In 1973, the Blue Devils finished 2–8–1. After losing to No. 9 Tennessee and defeating Washington to start the season, the Blue Devils embarked upon a six-game losing streak before tying Wake Forest. The last game of the season saw the Blue Devils defeat North Carolina by a score of 27–10. The 1974 season saw the Blue Devils go 6–5. After dropping the season opener to NC State, Duke won four straight; defeating South Carolina, Virginia, Purdue and Army. Duke then lost consecutive games to Clemson and #12 Florida. After defeating Georgia Tech and Wake Forest the next two weeks, Duke closed the season with losses to Maryland and North Carolina.

In 1975, the Blue Devils struggled to a 4–5–2 mark. McGee took his Blue Devils to Los Angeles for a showdown against #4 USC, a game Duke lost by a score of 35–7. After beating Virginia, Duke lost to Pittsburgh. After defeating Army and Clemson, the Blue Devils lost to No. 12 Florida and Georgia Tech. Duke then defeated Wake Forest and tied NC State and North Carolina. In 1976, the Dukies finished 5–5–1. After kicking off the season with a road win over Tennessee, the Blue Devils lost to South Carolina. Duke then defeated Virginia and lost to No. 2 Pittsburgh. After defeating Miami, Duke tied Clemson. After losing to No. 6 Maryland the following week, the Dukies closed the season by beating Georgia Tech, losing to Wake Forest, beating NC State and losing to North Carolina. The 1977 campaign would result in a 5–6 record. McGee's squad began the season with losses to East Carolina and #1 Michigan in Ann Arbor, Michigan. Then, Duke won three straight, beating Virginia, Navy and South Carolina. After dropping back-to-back games to Clemson and Maryland, the Blue Devils defeated Georgia Tech and Wake Forest. McGee's squad closed the 1977 season with losses to NC State and North Carolina. McGee's final season in 1978 would result in a 4–7 record. After defeating Georgia Tech and South Carolina to begin the campaign, the Blue Devils traveled to Ann Arbor, Michigan for another game against #4 Michigan, and lost to the Wolverines by a score of 52–0. The next week, Duke beat Virginia but then lost their next four. After defeating Wake Forest, Duke lost its last two to NC State and North Carolina.

=== Shirley Wilson era (1979–1982) ===
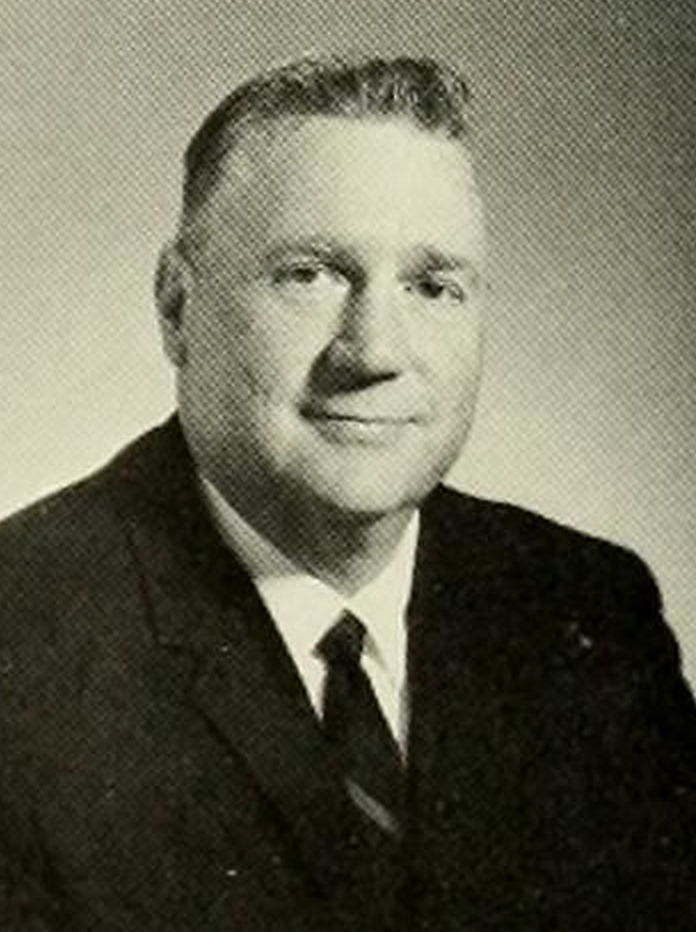
Coach Wilson

Elon head coach Shirley "Red" Wilson replaced McGee and went 16–27–1 as Duke's head football coach. Wilson's teams only won two games in his first two seasons, then had back-to-back 6–5 records. Wilson's teams became known for their innovative passing attack under offensive coordinator Steve Spurrier, whose 1982 offense featuring quarterback Ben Bennett set a school record for yardage before Wilson retired and Spurrier left to become the head coach of the United States Football League's (USFL) Tampa Bay Bandits.

Wilson led the Blue Devils to a 2–8–1 record in his first season. Duke began the season with a victory over East Carolina. That was followed by a loss to South Carolina, a loss to Virginia, a tie against Army, a win over Richmond, and losses to Clemson, Maryland Georgia Tech, #20 Wake Forest, NC State and North Carolina. In 1980, Duke compiled a 2–9 record. After losing their first five games to start the season, the Blue Devils defeated Clemson by a score of 34–17. After losing to Maryland, the Blue Devils lost their last three to close the season. In 1981, Wilson led the Blue Devils to an improved 6–5 record. The Blue Devils began the season with losses to No. 11 Ohio State and South Carolina before winning three straight. After losing to No. 6 Clemson and Maryland, the Blue Devils won three straight before losing to North Carolina in the regular season finale. Wilson's last season in 1982 was a 6–5 campaign. The Blue Devils started the season with three straight wins before losing to four straight. The Blue Devils then beat Georgia Tech and Wake Forest before losing to NC State and defeating North Carolina. Duke's 1982 team, with Steve Spurrier serving as offensive coordinator, was the first in Atlantic Coast Conference history to average more than 300 passing yards per game.

=== Steve Sloan era (1983–1986) ===
There was hope when Steve Sloan was hired that the Duke football program would finally return to its glory days under Wallace Wade. Sloan played quarterback for Bear Bryant at Alabama in the 1960s and had winning records as the head football coach at both Vanderbilt and Texas Tech, two programs that had struggled prior to his arrival, and also served as head coach at Ole Miss. However, Sloan could not translate his successes from those places to Duke. Sloan's Blue Devils teams had a 13–31 overall record in the four seasons he was there, failing to win more than four games in a single season. Sloan resigned after four seasons as Duke head coach to become athletics director at the University of Alabama.

Sloan led the Blue Devils to a 3–8 record in his first season. The season began with seven consecutive losses before the Dukies won their first game of the season over Georgia Tech, which was the first in a three-game winning streak. The Blue Devils defeated Wake Forest the following week and followed that with a 27–26 win over NC State. The Blue Devils lost by a score of 34–27 to North Carolina in the last game of the 1983 season. The 1984 season was a 2–9 struggle. After defeating Indiana in the season opener, the Blue Devils lost their next eight. Duke finally broke through with their second win of the season in the season's next-to-last game over NC State by a score of 16–13. Duke lost in their annual regular season finale bout against North Carolina by a score of 17–15. In 1985, Duke slightly improved to a 4–7 record. Sloan's Blue Devils began the season with a victory over Northwestern, then lost to West Virginia and beat Ohio. After losing six straight, the Blue Devils won their last two, defeating NC State and North Carolina. Duke duplicated their 4–7 mark in 1986, Sloan's last season in Durham. The Blue Devils defeated Northwestern for the second straight year in the season opener, Duke lost to Georgia by a score of 31–7. The Blue Devils then won their next two, defeating Ohio and Virginia. After losing their next four, Sloan's squad defeated Wake Forest. Duke lost its last two of the season to NC State and North Carolina.

=== Steve Spurrier era (1987–1989) ===
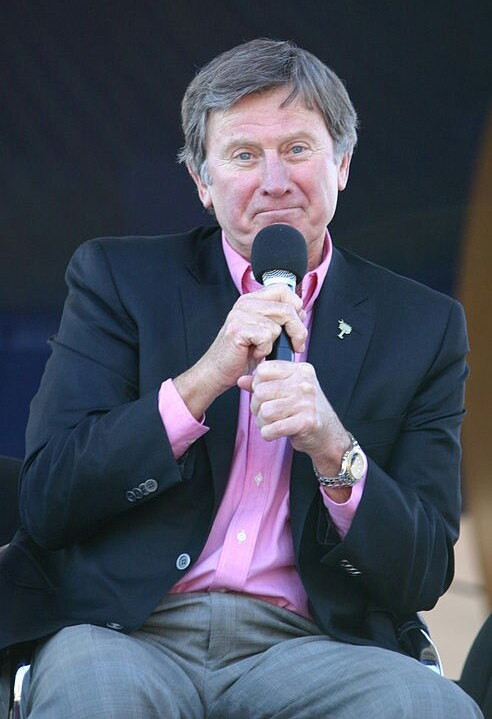
Coach Spurrier

The Duke Blue Devils football program had a string of successful years in the late 1980s when the team's head coach was Steve Spurrier. Spurrier won the Heisman Trophy as a quarterback at Florida in 1966 and had served as an assistant coach with the Gators, Georgia Tech and Duke as well as head coach of the USFL's Tampa Bay Bandits. Duke was Spurrier's first college head coaching position. When Spurrier arrived as Duke's 17th head football coach in program history, he inherited a Duke program that was commonly viewed as the worst football program in the ACC. The Duke football program had not been to a bowl game in more than a quarter-century, since 1960. Unlike most of his predecessors since Wallace Wade, Spurrier was able to have success as Duke's head football coach. He hired coaches Ian Goodall, Joe Jeb, and Patrick Cooke to serve as assistant coaches. Spurrier led the Blue Devils to a share of the ACC title in 1989, its first ACC football title of any kind, shared or outright, since the Bill Murray era. Spurrier won ACC Coach of the Year honors in 1988 and 1989 for his achievements. He led Duke to the 1989 All-American Bowl, a game they lost 49–21 to Texas Tech. That bowl appearance was the program's first bowl appearance since the 1960 Cotton Bowl.

Spurrier's first season in 1987 resulted in a 5–6 record. The Blue Devils began the season with three wins; defeating Colgate, Northwestern and Vanderbilt. Spurrier's squad then suffered through a four-game losing streak. After defeating Georgia Tech on Halloween, Duke lost its next two before defeating North Carolina in the season finale. Spurrier's squad began the 1988 season by defeating Northwestern, Tennessee, The Citadel, Virginia and Vanderbilt. After losing to No. 11 Clemson and Maryland, the Blue Devils defeated Georgia Tech, tied NC State and defeated North Carolina. Spurrier's last season in 1989 was an 8–4 mark. Duke began their season by losing to South Carolina, defeating Northwestern, losing to No. 17 Tennessee and losing to Virginia. The following week, Spurrier's Blue Devils stunned No. 7 Clemson by a score of 21–17 that would begin a seven-game winning streak. The win is Duke's last win over a top 10 ranked opponent to date. Duke followed up the Clemson win with wins over Army, Maryland, Georgia Tech, Wake Forest, No. 22 NC State and North Carolina (by a score of 41–0). The Blue Devils then made their first bowl appearance since 1960 in the All-American Bowl, losing to Texas Tech by a score of 49–21.

In what would become a recurring trend at most of his coaching stops, Spurrier's teams regularly beat their biggest rivals while he brashly "needled" them with jokes and "zingers" that were amusing to his fans but infuriating to opponents. Spurrier's Duke squads went 3–0 against archrival North Carolina, including a 41–0 victory in Chapel Hill that clinched a share of the 1989 ACC title. At Spurrier's suggestion, that win was followed by a joyful team picture taken in front of the Kenan Memorial Stadium scoreboard, a photo that still rankles some Tar Heel supporters. After three seasons and a 20–13–1 overall record, and leading the Blue Devils to seemingly unheard of football success, Spurrier left Duke after the 1989 season to accept the head football coaching position at his alma mater Florida, where he would cement his legacy as one of college football's greatest head coaches. Spurrier is the last head football coach to date to leave Duke with a winning record. The 1989 ACC co-championship was the last title, shared or outright, by any school in the state of North Carolina in the pre-championship game era, and would be the last title for a North Carolina–based team until Wake Forest won their second ACC Title in 2006.

=== Barry Wilson era (1990–1993) ===
Barry Wilson was promoted from assistant coach and took over the Blue Devils football program after the departure of Steve Spurrier, but struggled with a 13–30–1 record in four seasons despite inheriting a team that had shared an ACC championship the season before he became the head coach. Unable to duplicate or build upon the successes of his predecessor, Wilson resigned as head coach after the 1993 season.

In 1990, the Blue Devils finished with a 4–7 record. Duke began the season with a loss to South Carolina and a victory over Northwestern. After consecutive losses to No. 10 Virginia and #19 Clemson, Wilson's Dukies defeated Army and Western Carolina. Duke then lost to Maryland and #16 Georgia Tech before defeating Wake Forest. The Blue Devils finished the season with losses to NC State and North Carolina. In 1991, Duke finished 4–6–1. They began the season by tying South Carolina. The Blue Devils then won their next two, defeating Rutgers and Colgate. They then lost to Virginia by a score of 34–3. After defeating Vanderbilt and Maryland in consecutive weeks by a score of 17–13, the Blue Devils lost their last five to close the season. In 1992, Duke went 2–9. Duke began the season with a 48–21 loss to ACC newcomer Florida State. Duke then went 2–2 over the next four games, losing to Vanderbilt, beating Rice, losing to No. 14 Virginia, and beating East Carolina. Duke lost its last five games of the season to close out the 1992 campaign. Wilson's last season in 1993 was a 3–8 mark. Duke kicked off the season against #1 Florida State, losing 45–7. After losing to Rutgers the next week, Duke defeated Army to win its first game of the season. Duke next lost its next four, starting with #22 Virginia and #11 Tennessee. Duke dropped games to Clemson and Maryland during the latter half of the four-game losing streak. Duke closed the season with two wins and two losses, defeating Wake Forest, losing to Georgia Tech, defeating #22 NC State, and losing to No. 13 North Carolina.

=== Fred Goldsmith era (1994–1998) ===
On December 16, 1993, Rice head coach Fred Goldsmith was named Wilson's replacement, becoming the Blue Devils' 19th head football coach. Goldsmith arrived in Durham as a 20-year coaching veteran who had served nine years as defensive coordinator/associate head coach under Ken Hatfield; four years at Air Force and five years at Arkansas. In addition to the five-year head coaching stint at Rice, Goldsmith had served one year as the head coach at Slippery Rock University, an NCAA Division II school located in Slippery Rock, Pennsylvania. Under Goldsmith, the Blue Devils compiled a 17–39 record in five seasons.

The Blue Devils rose to prominence again in 1994. The team raced out to an 8–1 record, and was briefly ranked as high as #13 in the country before losing the last two heart-breaking games of the season 24–23 to NC State and 41–40 to arch-rival North Carolina by missing two extra-point attempts. The 1994 team played in the program's first New Years Day Bowl game since 1961, falling to Wisconsin 34–21 in the 1995 Hall of Fame Bowl, later known as the Outback Bowl. After 1994, however, Duke's football program continued to decline, with the team lacking a winning season the remainder of Goldsmith's tenure. Goldsmith's teams struggled after that 1994 season, failing to win more than four games in a single season.

In 1995, the Blue Devils finished 3–8. They began their season with a loss to No. 1 Florida State by a score of 70–26. After defeating Rutgers and Army, Duke lost its next five before defeating Wake Forest. This would be the last conference win until the Blue Devils beat Wake Forest again three seasons later. They then lost their last two to No. 24 Clemson and North Carolina. Goldsmith's 1996 Duke team went 0–11, the school's first winless record in the modern era and only the second winless season in school history. In 1997, the Blue Devils went 2–9. The Blue Devils lost to NC State and Northwestern to start the season, then they broke their losing streak, defeating Army and Navy in consecutive weeks for their only wins of the season. Duke lost to Maryland, #4 Florida State, Virginia, Wake Forest, Clemson, Georgia Tech and #8 North Carolina to close the season. The Blue Devils compiled a 4–7 record in 1998. Duke won its first two out of the gate, rolling over Western Carolina and Northwestern. Goldsmith's squad lost then lost three in a row, dropping contests to No. 11 Florida State, #11 Virginia and Georgia Tech. The Blue Devils broke the ACC losing streak with a win against Wake Forest. They managed one more conference win against Clemson and finished the season with losses to Maryland and North Carolina. Goldsmith was fired after the 1998 season with a 17–39 overall record as head coach of the Blue Devils.

=== Carl Franks era (1999–2003) ===
On December 1, 1998, his 38th birthday, Carl Franks, offensive coordinator at Florida under former Blue Devils head coach Steve Spurrier, was hired to replace Fred Goldsmith and tasked with turning around the Duke football program. A Duke alum, Franks had also served as running backs coach at Duke under Spurrier from 1987 to 1989 and had played running back and tight end for the Blue Devils under Shirley Wilson from 1980 to 1982. The hiring was well-received and applauded, as Franks had overseen one of college football's most potent and explosive offenses that helped the Gators win the national championship in 1996, coached a Heisman Trophy winner in Danny Wuerffel and had many players drafted into the NFL.

Franks led the Blue Devils to a 3–8 record in 1999. The Franks era began with losses to East Carolina, Northwestern, Vanderbilt and #1 Florida State. The Blue Devils won their first game of the season in their fifth game of the season against Virginia. After consecutive losses to No. 8 Georgia Tech and NC State, Duke went 2–2 in the last four games; beating Maryland, losing to Clemson, beating Wake Forest, and losing to North Carolina. From 2000 to 2001 Duke suffered a 22-game losing streak, with both the 2000 and 2001 seasons being winless 0–11 campaigns, with only four of the 22 losses coming by eight points or fewer. During the streak, Franks, when asked what the team's problems were, was quoted as saying "Winning football games has certainly been harder than I anticipated." Duke finished 2–10 in 2002. The Blue Devils ended their long losing streak spanning two full seasons in the season opener against East Carolina by a score of 23–16. Duke then dropped its next three to Louisville, Northwestern, and #5 Florida State before defeating Navy by a score of 43–17. It would prove to be Duke's last win of the season, as the Blue Devils lost its last seven to finish the year. Duke went 4–8 in 2003. #18 Virginia defeated the Blue Devils in the season opener by a score of 27–0. After defeating Western Carolina and Rice the next two weeks, Duke lost its next six games, prompting the athletics administration to dismiss Franks as head coach after losing to Wake Forest. Defensive coordinator Ted Roof was appointed interim head coach. The Blue Devils' 1999–2001 teams were ranked 7th in a list on the 10 worst college football teams of all time by ESPN's Page 2. After going 7–45 in four full seasons and a partial fifth, Franks was fired and replaced by Roof. Despite the poor record, Franks was lauded for the academic success of his players, evidenced by his program winning the Academic Achievement Award from the American Football Coaches Association in 2003.

=== Ted Roof era (2004–2007) ===
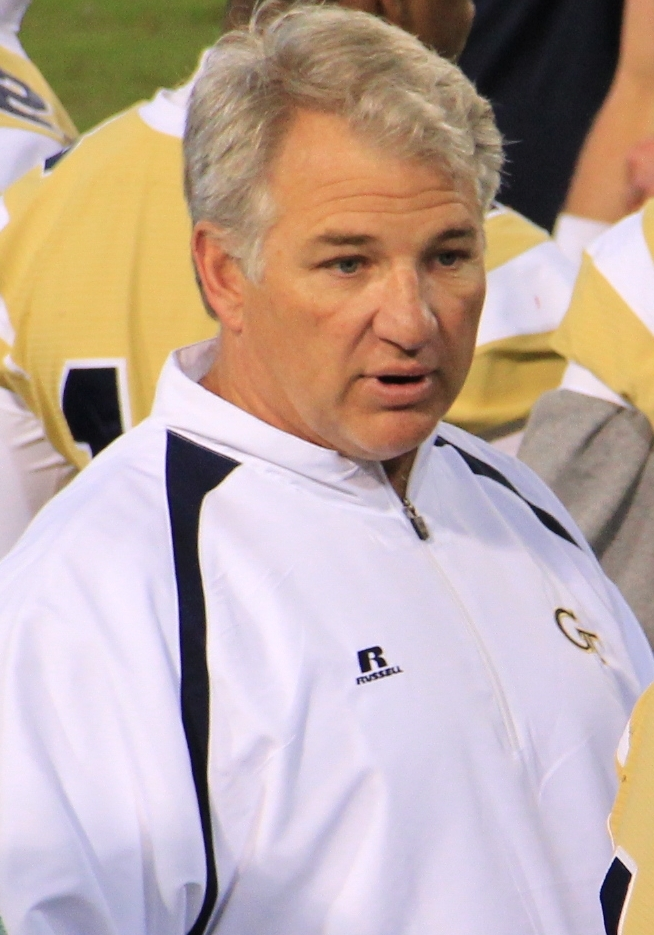
Coach Roof

Ted Roof was elevated from defensive coordinator and named interim Duke head coach for the final five games of the 2003 season. The Blue Devils won two of their last three games of the season, Roof's interim tag was removed, and he was named the program's 21st head football coach in 2004. Roof's good times did not last, as he also struggled mightily as Duke's head coach, compiling a dismal 6–45 record before his firing after four seasons and a partial fifth. One positive aspect, however, from Roof's tenure was that Duke defenses consistently ranked in the top 30 in tackles for loss for the first time in years. Roof would go on to win a national championship as Auburn's defensive coordinator in 2010 under head coach Gene Chizik.

Roof led the Blue Devils to a 2–9 record in 2004. Roof's squad began the season with four straight losses to Navy, UConn, Virginia Tech and #23 Maryland. The Blue Devils earned their first win of the season in their fifth game of the season against FCS opponent The Citadel. Duke then suffered through another four-game losing streak; losing to Georgia Tech, #14 Virginia, Wake Forest and #13 Florida State. Duke then beat Clemson and lost to North Carolina to cap the season. In 2005, the Blue Devils finished 1–10 The Blue Devils started with losses to East Carolina and #7 Virginia Tech before winning their only contest of the season over FCS opponent VMI. Duke finished the season with losses to No. 23 Virginia, Navy, #9 Miami, Georgia Tech #11 Florida State, Wake Forest, Clemson and North Carolina. After a winless 0–12 campaign in 2006, the 2007 team finished 1–11. Roof led his squad to a 1–11 record in his final season. Duke began the season with losses to UConn and Virginia. After defeating Northwestern to snap a 22-game losing streak, Duke dropped its last nine games to Navy, Miami, Wake Forest, #12 Virginia Tech, Florida State, Clemson, Georgia Tech, Notre Dame and North Carolina.

=== David Cutcliffe era (2008–2021) ===
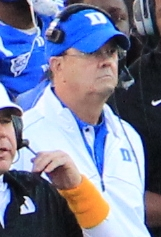
Coach Cutcliffe

In December 2007, Tennessee offensive coordinator and former Ole Miss head coach David Cutcliffe was hired as Duke's 22nd head football coach. Cutcliffe had a reputation for being an outstanding offensive mind and quarterbacks coach, as he had helped develop both Peyton and Eli Manning. As offensive coordinator under head coach Phillip Fulmer with the Tennessee Volunteers, he oversaw an explosive offense that helped the Volunteers win the 1998 national championship. In 2008, a judge ruled in favor of Duke after they pulled out of a four-game contract with the University of Louisville; the judge stated that it was up to Louisville to find a suitable replacement as, he wrote in the ruling, Duke's lawyers had persuasively argued that any Division I team would be equivalent or better. Duke went 4–8 in 2008 and Duke's 2009 season was a 5–7 record, the closest the school had come to bowl eligibility since 1994.

In January 2010, following Lane Kiffin's abrupt departure for USC after one season as head coach at Tennessee, Cutcliffe, an assistant coach for the Volunteers for twenty years, quickly emerged as a leading candidate to replace Kiffin. Cutcliffe, however, ultimately rebuffed Tennessee's overtures, remaining at Duke and stating, "After much thought and consideration, Karen and I reached the decision that Duke is the place for our family. We have both family members and lifetime friends in the Knoxville community and share a deep respect for the University of Tennessee. Our ties to the school and the eastern Tennessee area are obvious. But before Tennessee's hiring process comes to a conclusion, I know that Duke University is where I want to coach." The position eventually went to Derek Dooley. Cutcliffe's decision was widely lauded as a rare example of commitment and integrity among prominent college football coaches.

Cutcliffe's Duke teams had back-to-back 3–9 seasons in 2010 and 2011. Duke's 2012 team, despite low preseason expectations, after a 33–30 win against rival North Carolina became bowl eligible for the first time since 1994. Extending its season to December 27, 2012, Duke fell to Cincinnati 48–34 in a close contest in the 2012 Belk Bowl, finishing the season with a 6–7 record. On November 21, 2012, Duke extended Cutcliffe's contract through June 2019.

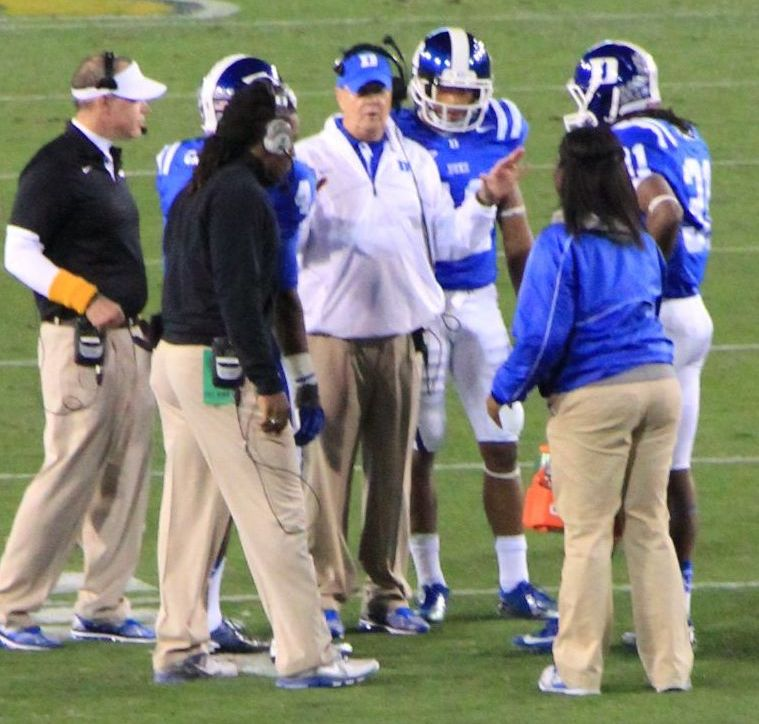
Cutcliffe meeting with players, 2012

Duke's 2013 season was a break-out year, as the Blue Devils have continued to cross off many of their infamous losing streaks. On October 26, 2013, Duke achieved its first win over a ranked team since 1994 with a 13–10 victory over #14 Virginia Tech at Lane Stadium in Blacksburg, Virginia, a rarity for the Duke football program. That win over Virginia Tech was also Duke's first road win over a ranked team since 1971. Following a bye week, on November 9, 2013, the Blue Devils achieved their first winning season since 1994 with a 38–20 home victory over in-state rival NC State, their seventh of the season. Extending its winning streak to 6 straight by defeating #24 Miami 48–30 on November 16, Duke appeared in the AP Poll for the first time since 1994, listed at No. 25 with a record of 8–2. With a win at Wake Forest on November 23, 2013, Duke claimed its ninth victory in a regular season for the first time since 1941, the season in which the Blue Devils hosted the Rose Bowl. The win also gave Duke at least a share of the Coastal Division title and a #24 AP Poll ranking. With a 27–25 win over North Carolina on November 30, 2013, Duke locked up their first 10-win season in school history, the Coastal Division title, and a spot in the 2013 ACC Championship Game against Florida State, during which time Duke was ranked No. 20. The Blue Devils lost that game to the Seminoles, the eventual national champions, by a score of 45–7. David Cutcliffe received the Walter Camp Coach of the Year award in 2013. The Blue Devils were invited to the Chick-fil-A Bowl, where they lost another close, hard-fought game 52–48 to Texas A&M to finish the season with a record of 10–4. After the 2013 season, offensive coordinator Kurt Roper left Duke to accept the same position on Will Muschamp's staff at Florida.

With Scottie Montgomery in his first season as offensive coordinator, Duke finished 9–4 in 2014. The Blue Devils began the season with four wins; defeating Elon, Troy, Kansas and Tulane. Cutcliffe's squad suffered its first defeat in the season's fifth game against Miami. Duke then won its next four; defeating #22 Georgia Tech (the team's first victory over the Yellow Jackets in a decade), Virginia, Pittsburgh and Syracuse. After dropping consecutive games to Virginia Tech and North Carolina, The Blue Devils closed the regular season with a win over Wake Forest. Duke was offered and accepted a berth in the Sun Bowl, a game they lost to No. 15 Arizona State by a score of 36–31. Wide receiver Jamison Crowder was the team's star player and would be drafted in the fourth round in the 2015 NFL draft by the Washington Redskins. Crowder finished his career tied for the most receptions in ACC football history with 283 for 3,641 yards and 23 touchdowns. He also returned a school-record four punt returns for touchdowns. Cutcliffe's success at Duke placed him as a candidate in several head coaching searches, including at Michigan (a job that eventually went to Jim Harbaugh) and Louisville (a job that eventually went to Bobby Petrino).

2015 would see the Blue Devils finish 8–5. Duke began the season with wins over Tulane and NC Central. After losing to No. 23 Northwestern, the Blue Devils won their next four; defeating #20 Georgia Tech, Boston College, Army and Virginia Tech (in a four-overtime thriller). Cutcliffe's team then embarked upon a four-game losing streak; beginning with a controversial loss to Miami. The Hurricanes used eight laterals (reminiscent of the 1982 Cal-Stanford ending) on a kickoff return with no time remaining to score the game-winning touchdown and stun the Blue Devils by a score of 30–27. However, video evidence showed the play should have been blown dead and not counted as a touchdown, as Miami players who possessed the ball on that play's knee were shown to be on the ground more than once. Although the outcome of the game couldn't be changed, the Atlantic Coast Conference subsequently suspended the game and replay officials for failing to catch the errors and make the correct call. Duke then lost games to No. 21 North Carolina by a score of 66–31, Pittsburgh by a score of 31–13 and Virginia by a score of 42–34. Duke concluded the regular season by snapping its four-game losing streak in a 27–21 win over Wake Forest. Duke finished the season by winning its first bowl game since 1961, defeating Indiana in overtime by a score of 44–41 in the Pinstripe Bowl. After the 2015 season, Montgomery left the Blue Devils to accept the head coaching position at East Carolina. To replace Montgomery, Cutcliffe promoted Zac Roper to offensive coordinator.

2015 also marked the beginning of a $100 million renovation project to Wallace Wade Stadium. These renovations were initiated in an attempt to attract higher rated recruiting prospects and improve the overall fan experience. These renovations include, a new press box, new increased seating capacity, as well as new concourse and public area modifications. These changes began with the first phase in 2015 with the conclusion on the last home game. These initial changes consisted of dropping the field itself several feet down. This allowed the new stadium seats to be built into the newly created area cleared out by the field being dropped by over 6 feet. The second part of phase 1 was to clear the old existing press box. After this was concluded, there was a temporary press box built to house all media and stadium personnel during the 2015 season. After the conclusion of the 2015–2016 season phase 2 began. This phase consisted of building the new press box as well as a new scoreboard. This phase was concluded by the beginning of the 2016 season. Phase 3, which is the final phase in the project, will be concluded during the beginning of the 2016–2017 football season. This final phase consisted of finishing the renovation to the concourse area's as well as the entrances to the stadium itself. This construction, which is being carried out by The Beck Group is still underway and is expected to be concluded before the start of the 2016–2017 season.

Cutcliffe's Blue Devils struggled to a 4–8 record in 2016. Duke kicked off the season with a 49–6 win over NC Central. After losing to Wake Forest and Northwestern the next two weeks, the Blue Devils upset Notre Dame in South Bend, Indiana in the season's fourth game by a score of 38–35. The win was big for the Blue Devils. The Irish, one of college football's most consistent and storied national powers, came into the contest as 21-point favorites at home and suffered one of the worst defeats in their history. Duke then lost to Virginia and beat Army in messy conditions due to Hurricane Matthew. Next, the Blue Devils lost their next three to No. 7 Louisville, Georgia Tech and #23 Virginia Tech. After upsetting archrival #15 North Carolina, the Blue Devils closed the season with losses to Pittsburgh and Miami. On May 1, 2017, Duke again extended Cutcliffe's contract, keeping their head coach in Durham through June 30, 2021.

Duke finished 7–6 in 2017. They started the season on September 2 with a 60–7 victory over in-state Football Championship Subdivision opponent NC Central. In the season's second game, the Blue Devils defeated Northwestern by a margin of 41–17. Duke then defeated Baylor by a score of 34–20 to pick up their third victory of the season. Cutcliffe's squad improved to 4–0 after a 27–17 victory over archrival North Carolina on September 23. Then, the Blue Devils embarked upon a six-game losing streak, beginning with a 31–6 loss to No. 14 Miami. On October 7, Duke lost to Virginia by a margin of 28–21. The next week, they lost to Pittsburgh by a score of 24–17. The Blue Devils' fifth straight loss came on October 28 in the form of a 24–3 defeat at the hands of #13 Virginia Tech. After a 21–16 loss to Army, Cutcliffe's Blue Devils snapped their skid with a 43–20 win over Georgia Tech. In the regular season finale, the Blue Devils picked up their sixth win and attained bowl eligibility with a 31–23 win over rival Wake Forest. Duke accepted a berth in the 2017 Quick Lane Bowl, where they defeated Northern Illinois by a score of 36–14.

On November 28, 2021, it was announced that Cutcliffe and Duke University had agreed to mutually part ways following three straight losing seasons. Cutcliffe released the following statement: "After some detailed and amiable discussions with Nina King, we've mutually decided that it is the right time for change in the leadership of Duke Football. Karen and I have loved our time in Durham. Duke University will always hold a special place in our hearts. To our current and former players please know how much joy you've brought to our lives. To all of our coaches and staff, many who have been with us for 14 years, you will always have our love and respect. I want to thank Dick Brodhead for the opportunity to come here. I'm very thankful for Kevin White and Nina and their leadership. I can't say enough about all the faithful alumni and friends that gave us an opportunity to build and win here. I'm not sure just yet what the future will look like, but I am looking forward to some family time to reflect a bit on the past and see what the future holds." Cutcliffe is third on Duke's all-time wins list, behind only Hall of Famers Wallace Wade and Bill Murray.

=== Mike Elko era (2022–2023) ===
On December 10, 2021, Texas A&M defensive coordinator Mike Elko was announced as Duke's next head coach. Despite having no prior head coaching experience, Elko arrived in Durham with a reputation as a great defensive mind, having overseen accomplished defenses at Texas A&M under Jimbo Fisher and at Notre Dame under Brian Kelly. Additionally, Elko had previous ties to both the ACC and the state of North Carolina from his time as defensive coordinator at Wake Forest from 2014 to 2016.

The Blue Devils finished with a 9–4 record in 2022. The season began with a 30–0 shutout win over Temple. The next week, Elko's team defeated Northwestern by a score of 31–23. After a 49–20 win over FCS opponent North Carolina A&T, the Blue Devils suffered their first loss of the season in a 35–27 defeat to Kansas. After a 38–17 victory over Virginia, Duke dropped back to back games with a 23–20 overtime loss to rival Georgia Tech and 38–35 loss to archrival North Carolina. Elko's Blue Devils then reeled off three straight wins with a 45–21 victory over Miami, a 38–31 win over Boston College and a 24–7 victory over Virginia Tech. After a narrow 28–26 loss to Pittsburgh, Duke finished the regular season with a 34–31 win over rival Wake Forest. The Blue Devils accepted an invitation to the 2022 Military Bowl where they defeated UCF by a score of 30–13. With Duke's improvement in 2022, Mike Elko was named as the ACC's Coach of the Year after the season. On July 24, 2023, Duke and Mike Elko agreed to a contract extension that will keep the head coach in Durham through the 2029 season.

Duke compiled an 8–5 record in the 2023 season. They started the season with a stunning 28–7 upset win over #9 Clemson, the program's first win over a top 10 team in years. Elko's team then followed that up with a 42–7 win over FCS opponent Lafayette, a 38–14 victory over Northwestern and a 41–7 win over UConn. The Blue Devils suffered their first loss of the season the next week with a 21–14 defeat to Notre Dame. After a 24–3 win over rival NC State, Duke dropped back to back games with a 38–20 loss to Florida State and a 23–0 shutout to Louisville. After a 24–21 victory over Wake Forest, the Blue Devils dropped two more in a row with losses of 47–45 to North Carolina in double overtime and 30–27 to Virginia. Duke closed out the regular season with a 30–19 win over Pittsburgh.

On November 26, 2023, after initially saying he would stay with the Blue Devils, Mike Elko resigned as Duke head coach to accept the same position at Texas A&M. Running backs coach Trooper Taylor was named interim head coach for the 2023 Birmingham Bowl, a game in which Duke would defeat Troy by a score of 17–10. Elko became the first Duke head coach to leave with a winning record since Steve Spurrier. Elko also set the Duke program record for first-year head coaching wins with nine in 2022.

=== Manny Diaz era (2024–present) ===
On December 7, 2023, Penn State defensive coordinator Manny Diaz was formally introduced as the new Duke head coach. Diaz had prior ties to the ACC from his time both as an assistant coach at NC State from 2000 to 2005 and at Miami first as defensive coordinator from 2016 to 2018 then as the Hurricanes' head coach from 2019 to 2021.
