= Joe Giles-Harris =

American football player (born 1997)

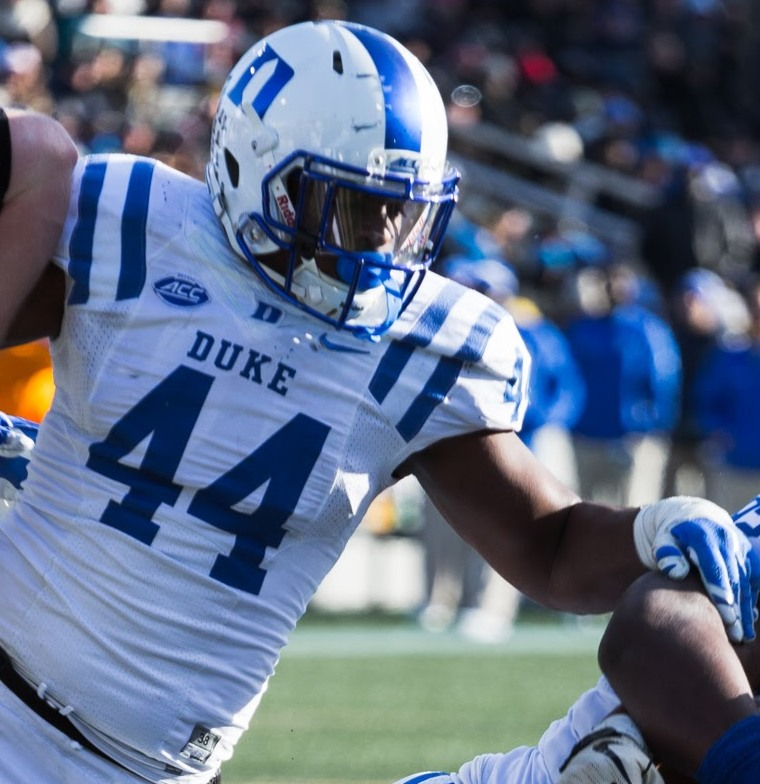
- Giles-Harris with the Duke Blue Devils in 2017

No. 43 – Cincinnati Bengals
- Position: Linebacker
- Roster status: Active

Personal information
- Born: April 1, 1997 (age 29); Nyack, New York, U.S.
- Listed height: 6 ft 2 in (1.88 m)
- Listed weight: 234 lb (106 kg)

Career information
- High school: St. Joseph (Montvale, New Jersey)
- College: Duke (2015–2018)
- NFL draft: 2019: undrafted

Career history
- Jacksonville Jaguars (2019–2020); Buffalo Bills (2021–2022); New England Patriots (2023–2024)*; Cincinnati Bengals (2024)*; Jacksonville Jaguars (2024); Cincinnati Bengals (2025–present)
- * Offseason or practice squad member only

Awards and highlights
- Second-team All-All-American (2017); First-team All-ACC (2017, 2018); Freshman All-American (2016)

Career NFL statistics as of 2025
- Total tackles: 57
- Sacks: 1.0
- Pass deflections: 2
- Stats at Pro Football Reference

Joe Giles-Harris (born April 1, 1997) is an American professional football linebacker for the Cincinnati Bengals of the National Football League (NFL). He played college football for the Duke Blue Devils.

== Early life ==
Joe Giles-Harris was born on April 1, 1997, in Nyack, New York. He attended Saint Joseph Regional High School in Montvale, New Jersey.

== College career ==
During his time with the Blue Devils, Giles-Harris had 313 total career tackles along with nine and a half sacks, two interceptions, one forced fumble, and one fumble recovery.

== Professional career ==
Pre-draft measurables
Height	Weight	Arm length	Hand span	Wingspan	40-yard dash	10-yard split	20-yard split	20-yard shuttle	Three-cone drill	Vertical jump	Broad jump	Bench press
6 ft 1 3/4 in (1.87 m)	234 lb (106 kg)	31 1/4 in (0.79 m)	8 1/2 in (0.22 m)	6 ft 3 3/8 in (1.91 m)	4.75 s	1.56 s	2.79 s	4.40 s	7.09 s	29.5 in (0.75 m)	9 ft 3 in (2.82 m)	17 reps
All values from NFL Combine/Pro Day

=== Jacksonville Jaguars ===
Giles-Harris went undrafted in the 2019 NFL draft. He was signed by the Jacksonville Jaguars as an undrafted free agent on April 27, 2019. He was waived on September 2, and was re-signed to the practice squad. Giles-Harris was promoted to the active roster on October 21. He was waived again on November 2, and re-signed to the practice squad. Giles-Harris was promoted back to the active roster on December 5.

On September 5, 2020, Giles-Harris was waived by the Jaguars; he was re-signed to their practice squad the following day. He was placed on the practice squad/COVID-19 list by the team on October 17, and was activated back to the practice squad on October 22. Giles-Harris was elevated to the active roster on November 7 and November 14 for the team's Weeks 9 and 10 games against the Houston Texans and Green Bay Packers, and reverted to the practice squad after each game. He was signed to the active roster on November 21. In Week 14 against the Tennessee Titans, Giles-Harris recorded his first career sack on Ryan Tannehill during the 31–10 loss. He was waived after the season on May 4, 2021.

=== Buffalo Bills ===
On May 16, 2021, Giles-Harris signed a one-year contract with the Buffalo Bills. He was waived on August 31, and re-signed to the practice squad the next day. After the Bills were eliminated in the Divisional Round of the 2021 playoffs, Giles-Harris signed a reserve/future contract with the team on January 24, 2022.

On August 30, 2022, Giles-Harris was waived by the Bills; he was re-signed to the practice squad the next day. He was released by the Bills on January 17, 2023.

=== New England Patriots ===
On August 9, 2023, Giles-Harris signed with the New England Patriots. He was waived on August 29 and re-signed to the practice squad. Giles-Harris signed a reserve/future contract with New England on January 8, 2024.

Giles-Harris was waived by the Patriots on August 27, 2024, and re-signed to the practice squad. He was released by New England on December 2.

=== Cincinnati Bengals ===
On December 17, 2024, Giles-Harris was signed to the Cincinnati Bengals' practice squad.

=== Jacksonville Jaguars (second stint) ===
On December 24, 2024, Giles-Harris was signed by the Jacksonville Jaguars off of the Bengals' practice squad. He made two appearances for Jacksonville, recording one tackle.

=== Cincinnati Bengals (second stint) ===
On April 9, 2025, Giles-Harris signed a one-year contract with the Cincinnati Bengals. On August 26, he was released as part of final roster cuts and re-signed to the practice squad the next day. On October 30, Giles-Harris was signed to the active roster. In 10 appearances for Cincinnati, he recorded two pass deflections and 27 combined tackles.

On January 5, 2026, the Bengals signed Giles-Harris to a one-year contract extension. On August 30, Giles-Harris was released by the Bengals as a part of final roster cuts; he was re-signed to the team's practice squad the next day. On September 26, he was signed to the active roster.

== Career statistics ==
=== NFL ===
Legend
**Bold**	Career high

Year	Team	Games		Tackles				Interceptions							Fumbles	
Year	Team	GP	GS	Comb	Solo	Ast	TFL	Sck	PD	Int	Yds	Avg	Lng	TD	FF	FR
2019	JAX	5	0	3	2	1	0	0.0	0	0	0	0.0	0	0	0	0
2020	JAX	9	3	20	10	10	**2**	**1.0**	0	0	0	0.0	0	0	0	0
2021	BUF	2	0	2	1	1	0	0.0	0	0	0	0.0	0	0	0	0
2022	BUF	1	0	1	1	0	0	0.0	0	0	0	0.0	0	0	0	0
2024	NE	3	0	3	2	1	0	0.0	0	0	0	0.0	0	0	0	0
2024	JAX	2	0	1	0	1	0	0.0	0	0	0	0.0	0	0	0	0
2025	CIN	10	0	**27**	**14**	**13**	0	0.0	**2**	0	0	0.0	0	0	0	0
Career		32	3	57	30	27	2	1.0	2	0	0	0.0	0	0	0	0

=== College ===
Year	Team	Games		Tackles				Fumbles				Interceptions			
Year	Team	GP	GS	Cmb	Solo	Ast	Sck	FF	FR	Yds	TD	Int	Yds	TD	PD
2016	Duke	12	12	107	55	52	4	0	1	0	0	1	3	0	2
2017	Duke	13	13	125	54	71	4.5	1	0	0	0	1	10	0	4
2018	Duke	9	9	81	34	47	1	0	0	0	0	0	0	0	2
Career		34	34	313	143	170	9.5	1	1	0	0	2	13	0	8

== Personal life ==
His brother JT plays for the Denver Outlaws of the Premier Lacrosse League.
