= Matt Guerrieri =

American football coach (born 1989)

Current position
- Title: Safeties coach and passing game coordinator
- Team: Ohio State
- Conference: Big Ten

Biographical details
- Born: September 16, 1989 (age 37); Willoughby, Ohio, U.S.

Playing career
- 2007–2010: Davidson
- Position: Defensive back

Coaching career (HC unless noted)
- 2011: Lenoir–Rhyne (GA)
- 2012–2014: Duke (GA)
- 2015–2017: Duke (S)
- 2018–2021: Duke (Co-DC/S)
- 2022: Ohio State (Senior Advisor/Senior Analyst)
- 2023: Indiana (Co-DC/S)
- 2024: Ohio State (S)
- 2025–present: Ohio State (S/PGC)

Accomplishments and honors

Championships
- CFP national champion (2024)

Matt Guerrieri (born September 16, 1989) is an American football coach who is currently the safeties coach for the Ohio State Buckeyes.

== Playing career ==
Guerrieri played four years at Davidson where he started at safety, was a captain in his senior year for the Wildcats and was a three-time All-Pioneer Football League Honor Roll selection. However his college career would be plagued by injuries as he suffered season ending injuries twice.

== Coaching career ==
Guerrieri started out his coaching career as a graduate assistant for Lenoir–Rhyne for one season. After that Guerrieri would head to Duke as a graduate assistant. After three years as a graduate assistant for Duke, Guerrieri would be promoted to coach the safeties for Duke. Then after coaching the safeties for three years, Guerrieri would get his first shot as a coordinator, as he was promoted be the co-defensive coordinator and safeties coach for Duke. After coaching a total 10 years for Duke, he would leave for Ohio State to be a senior advisor and analyst for the Buckeyes. After one year with the Buckeyes, Guerrieri would be hired as the co-defensive coordinator and safeties coach for the Indiana Hoosiers. After one season with the Hoosiers, Guerrieri returned to the Buckeyes to become the safeties coach.
