= Breon Borders =

American football player (born 1995)

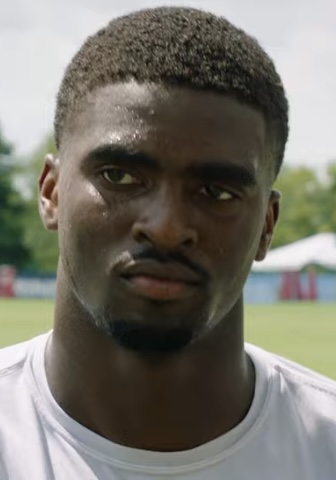
- Borders in 2021

Profile
- Position: Cornerback

Personal information
- Born: July 22, 1995 (age 31); Statesville, North Carolina, U.S.
- Listed height: 6 ft 0 in (1.83 m)
- Listed weight: 189 lb (86 kg)

Career information
- High school: Statesville (NC)
- College: Duke (2013–2016)
- NFL draft: 2017: undrafted

Career history
- Oakland Raiders (2017)*; Buffalo Bills (2017); Houston Texans (2018)*; Jacksonville Jaguars (2018–2019); Washington Redskins (2019); Pittsburgh Steelers (2020)*; Miami Dolphins (2020)*; Tennessee Titans (2020–2021); Arizona Cardinals (2021); Chicago Bears (2022); Atlanta Falcons (2023)*; New England Patriots (2023)*; New York Giants (2024)*
- * Offseason or practice squad member only

Career NFL statistics
- Total tackles: 42
- Pass deflections: 7
- Interceptions: 1
- Fumble recoveries: 1
- Stats at Pro Football Reference

Breon Borders (born July 22, 1995) is an American professional football cornerback. He played college football for the Duke Blue Devils. He has been a member of 13 different NFL teams.

== Early life ==
Borders grew up in Statesville, North Carolina. During his senior year of high school, he was first-team all state as a football cornerback. In basketball, he was the county player of the year, leading his team to an overtime loss in the state championship game in which scored 26 points and gathered 9 rebounds. In track, Borders was the state champion in the 300 meter hurdles.

== College career ==
In his four years at Duke, Borders played in 49 games, with 35 starts. In his first year, he set Duke's all-time record for interceptions as a freshman. For his Duke career, Borders graduated with the school's 6th highest number of career interceptions, 2nd highest number of pass break ups, and 3rd highest number of passes successfully defended.

After his senior year, Borders was selected to the 2016 All-Atlantic Coast Conference third-team.

Overall, Borders recorded 148 total tackles, one sacks, 12 interceptions, 34 pass deflections, and two forced fumbles in his 49 games.

== Professional career ==
Pre-draft measurables
Height	Weight	Arm length	Hand span	Wingspan	40-yard dash	10-yard split	20-yard split	20-yard shuttle	Three-cone drill	Vertical jump	Broad jump	Bench press
5 ft 11 1/2 in (1.82 m)	189 lb (86 kg)	30 1/4 in (0.77 m)	8 1/4 in (0.21 m)	6 ft 1 7/8 in (1.88 m)	4.49 s	1.53 s	2.58 s	4.39 s	6.98 s	34.0 in (0.86 m)	10 ft 0 in (3.05 m)	12 reps
All values from Pro Day

=== Oakland Raiders ===
Borders signed with the Oakland Raiders as an undrafted free agent on May 5, 2017. He was waived on September 2, and was re-signed to the Raiders' practice squad the next day.

=== Buffalo Bills ===
On December 16, 2017, Borders was signed by the Buffalo Bills off the Raiders' practice squad.

On September 1, 2018, Borders was waived by the Bills.

=== Houston Texans ===
On September 12, 2018, Borders was signed to the Houston Texans' practice squad. He was released on October 2.

=== Jacksonville Jaguars ===
On October 25, 2018, Borders was signed to the Jacksonville Jaguars practice squad. He was promoted to the active roster on December 22.

On December 3, 2019, Borders was waived by the Jaguars and re-signed to the practice squad.

=== Washington Redskins ===
On December 24, 2019, Borders was signed by the Washington Redskins off the Jaguars practice squad. He was released on March 23, 2020.

=== Pittsburgh Steelers ===
Borders signed with the Pittsburgh Steelers on April 16, 2020. He was waived by Pittsburgh on August 11.

=== Miami Dolphins ===
Borders was claimed off waivers by the Miami Dolphins on August 12, 2020. He was waived by the Dolphins on September 5.

=== Tennessee Titans ===
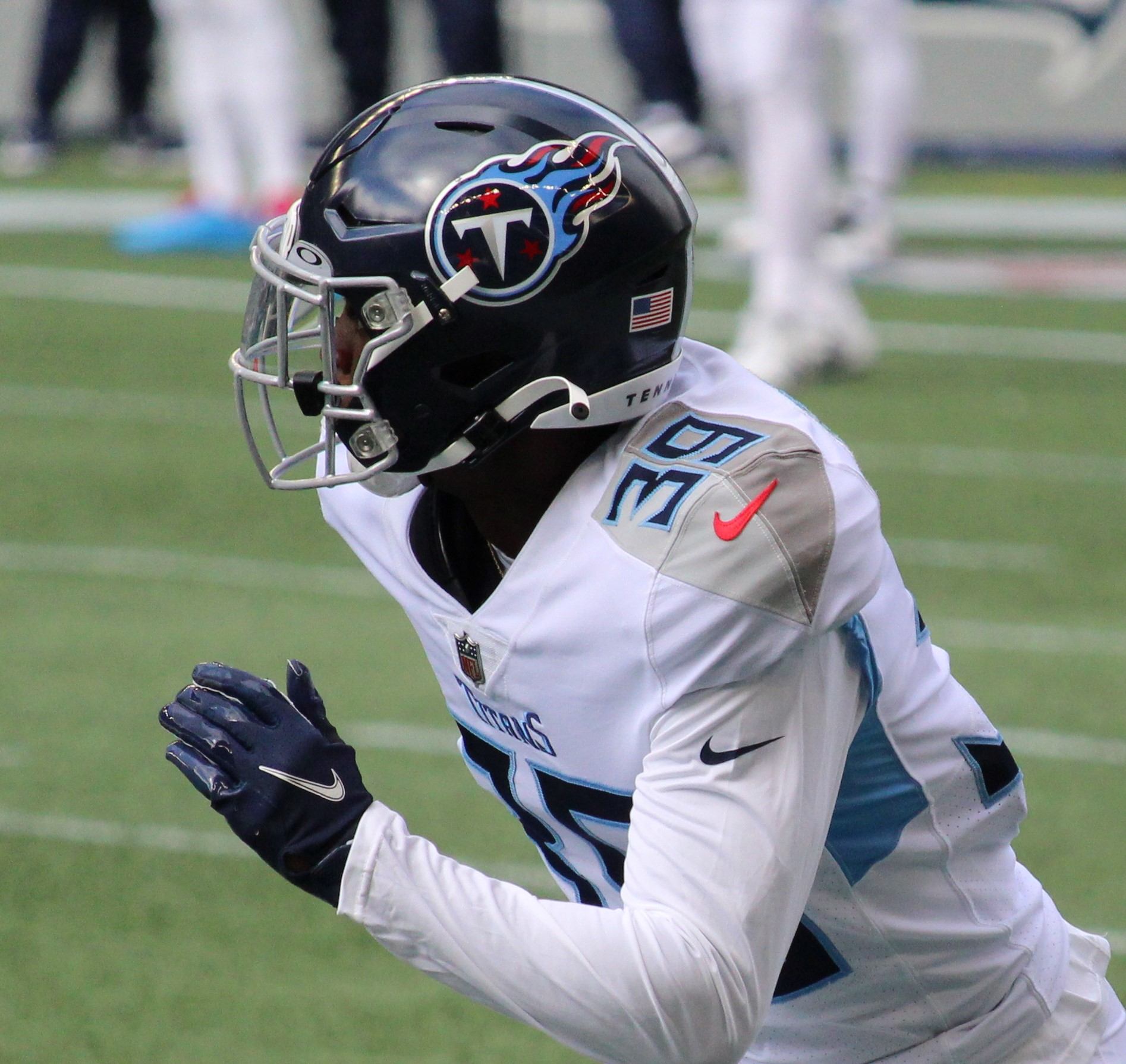
Borders in 2021

On September 21, 2020, Borders was signed to the Tennessee Titans' practice squad. He was placed on the practice squad/COVID-19 list by the team on October 8, and activated back to the practice squad on October 20. He was elevated to the active roster on October 31 for the team's week 8 game against the Cincinnati Bengals, and reverted to the practice squad after the game. He was signed to the active roster on November 7. In Week 12 against the Indianapolis Colts, Borders recorded his first career interception off a pass thrown by Philip Rivers during the 45–26 win. He was placed on injured reserve on December 12. Borders was waived by the Titans on February 25, 2021, but re-signed on March 1.

Borders played in nine games in 2021 before being released on November 9, 2021, but later re-signing to the practice squad.

=== Arizona Cardinals ===
On December 15, 2021, Borders was signed by the Arizona Cardinals off the Titans practice squad. He was waived on January 16, 2022. Borders signed a reserve/future contract with the Cardinals on January 19. He was released on August 14.

=== Chicago Bears ===
On November 22, 2022, Borders was signed to the Chicago Bears practice squad. He was promoted to the active roster on December 23.

=== Atlanta Falcons ===
On June 5, 2023, Borders signed with the Atlanta Falcons. He was suspended the first two games of the season by the NFL. Borders was released by Atlanta on August 29.

=== New England Patriots ===
On September 21, 2023, the New England Patriots signed Borders to their practice squad. He was not among the team's players signed to reserve/future contracts in 2024, and thus became a free agent at the expiration of his practice squad contract.

=== New York Giants ===
On July 28, 2024, Border signed with the New York Giants. He was released on August 25.
