= Shaun Wilson (American football) =

American football player (born 1995)

No. 38
- Position: Running back

Personal information
- Born: December 2, 1995 (age 30); Charlotte, North Carolina, U.S.
- Listed height: 5 ft 9 in (1.75 m)
- Listed weight: 185 lb (84 kg)

Career information
- High school: West Mecklenburg (Charlotte)
- College: Duke
- NFL draft: 2018: undrafted

Career history
- Tampa Bay Buccaneers (2018); Washington Redskins (2019); Tennessee Titans (2019–2020)*; Saskatchewan Roughriders (2022)*
- * Offseason or practice squad member only

Career NFL statistics
- Rushing attempts: 6
- Rushing yards: 29
- Receptions: 3
- Receiving yards: 5
- Return yards: 122
- Stats at Pro Football Reference

Shaun Wilson (born December 2, 1995) is an American former professional football player who was a running back in the National Football League (NFL). He played college football for the Duke Blue Devils and signed with the Tampa Bay Buccaneers as an undrafted free agent in 2018. Wilson was also a member of the Tampa Bay Buccaneers, Washington Redskins, and Tennessee Titans.

== Early life ==
Wilson attended and played high school football at West Mecklenburg High School.

== College career ==
Wilson attended and played college football at Duke University.

=== Collegiate statistics ===
Year	Team	Conf	Class	Pos	G	Rushing				Receiving			
Year	Team	Conf	Class	Pos	G	Att	Yds	Avg	TD	Rec	Yds	Avg	TD
2014	Duke	ACC	FR	RB	13	78	598	7.7	5	18	179	9.9	1
2015	Duke	ACC	SO	RB	11	84	424	5.0	3	19	207	10.9	1
2016	Duke	ACC	JR	RB	12	151	623	4.1	4	8	76	9.5	0
2017	Duke	ACC	SR	RB	13	162	818	5.0	6	36	263	7.3	4
Career					49	475	2,463	5.2	18	81	725	9.0	6

== Professional career ==
=== Tampa Bay Buccaneers ===
Wilson was signed to the Tampa Bay Buccaneers as an undrafted free agent on April 30, 2018. Wilson made his NFL debut in the season opener against the New Orleans Saints. In the 48–40 victory, he had a six-yard rush and a 29-yard kick return. Wilson was placed on injured reserve on November 13, after suffering a shoulder injury in Week 10. He finished his rookie season with six carries for 29 rushing yards.

On June 21, 2019, Wilson was waived by the Buccaneers.

=== Washington Redskins ===
On July 25, 2019, Wilson was signed by the Washington Redskins. He was placed on injured reserve on September 1. Wilson was waived from injured reserve on November 1.

=== Tennessee Titans ===
On December 24, 2019, Wilson was signed to the Tennessee Titans' practice squad. He signed a reserve/future contract with the Titans on January 20, 2020. Wilson was waived with a non-football injury designation on July 26.

=== Saskatchewan Roughriders ===
On August 29, 2022, Wilson signed with the Saskatchewan Roughriders of the Canadian Football League (CFL). He was released by the Riders in late October having never dressed for a game.
