= Jeff Faris =

American football player and coach (born 1990)

Current position
- Title: Head coach
- Team: Austin Peay
- Conference: UAC
- Record: 12–13

Biographical details
- Born: March 13, 1990 (age 36); Knoxville, Tennessee, U.S.

Playing career
- 2008–2011: Duke
- Position: Safety

Coaching career (HC unless noted)
- 2012–2013: Duke (GA)
- 2014–2016: Duke (WR)
- 2017: Duke (WR/ORC)
- 2018–2020: Duke (TE/ORC)
- 2021: Duke (co-OC/QB)
- 2022–2023: UCLA (TE)
- 2024–present: Austin Peay

Head coaching record
- Overall: 12–13

Jeffrey Faris (born March 13, 1990) is an American football coach. He is the head football coach for Austin Peay State University; a position he has held since 2024. He played college football at Duke, where he had spent the entirety of his coaching career before coming to UCLA.

== Playing career ==
Faris was a three-year safety at Duke who did not see much playing time, redshirting his true freshman season and appearing in one game each in his freshman and sophomore season.

== Coaching career ==
=== Duke ===
After graduating with a degree in economics in 2011, Faris was a graduate assistant at Duke, during which he earned his master's in economics and Christian studies. He was promoted to wide receivers coach in 2014 after offensive coordinator Kurt Roper left the program and Scottie Montgomery was promoted to offensive coordinator. He added offensive recruiting coordinator duties in 2017 and was reassigned to tight ends coach in 2018. He was named the Division I FBS recipient of the AFCA Assistant Coach of the Year in 2018, an award given to the assistant coach who "excels in community service, commitment to the student-athlete, on-field coaching success, and AFCA professional organization involvement."

Faris was promoted to co-offensive coordinator in 2021 in a series of staff changes made by David Cutcliffe. In addition to the promotion, he was shifted to quarterbacks coach and was also named the primary offensive play-caller.

=== UCLA ===
On January 19, 2022, Faris was announced as the new tight ends coach at UCLA.

=== Austin Peay ===
On December 9, 2023, Faris was named the head coach at Austin Peay.

== Head coaching record ==
Year	Team	Overall	Conference	Standing	Bowl/playoffs
Austin Peay Governors (United Athletic Conference) (2024–present)
2024	Austin Peay	4–8	3–5	T–5th	
2025	Austin Peay	7–5	4–4	5th	
2026	Austin Peay	5-2	1-1		
Austin Peay:		16–15	8-10		
Total:		12–13			
