= Ben Albert =

American football coach (born 1971)

Current position
- Title: Defensive line coach
- Team: Boston College Eagles
- Conference: ACC

Biographical details
- Born: March 19, 1972 (age 54); Paterson, New Jersey
- Education: University of Massachusetts Amherst (B.S. 1995, M.S. 1997)

Playing career
- 1990–1994: UMass
- Position: Defensive tackle

Coaching career (HC unless noted)
- 1995–1996: UMass (DL)
- 1997–2000: Richmond (DL/LB)
- 2001: Rutgers (DL)
- 2002–2003: UMass (STC/ILB)
- 2004: Richmond (STC/DL)
- 2006–2009: Delaware (AHC/LB)
- 2010: Jacksonville Jaguars (Asst. DL)
- 2011–2012: Temple (OLB)
- 2013–2015: Boston College (DL)
- 2016–2017: Duke (DL)
- 2018–2021: Duke (Co-DC/DL)
- 2022–2024: UMass (AHC/STC/DL)

Ben Albert (born March 19, 1971) is an American football coach and former player. He is the defensive line coach for the Boston College Eagles. Albert's previous stops include the University of Richmond, Rutgers University, the University of Delaware, the Jacksonville Jaguars, Temple University, Boston College, and Duke University.

== Coaching career ==
=== UMass (First stint) ===
Immediately following his playing career came to an end, Albert began coaching as a graduate assistant, coaching the defensive line for his alma mater, UMass, in 1995 and 1996.

=== Richmond (First stint) ===
From 1997 to 2000, Albert coached the defensive line and linebackers on Jim Reid's staff at Richmond. Reid was the head coach at UMass for Albert's first two seasons as a player.

In his four seasons, the Spiders had three winning seasons and won two Atlantic 10 Conference championships (1998, 2000), and also reached the NCAA Division I-AA playoffs in 1998 and 2000.

During his time, Albert mentored Paris Lenon to All-Atlantic 10 seasons, and he went on to have a twelve-year NFL career. Albert also got his first NFL experience during his first Richmond tenure when he had the opportunity to work as minority fellowship intern with the Oakland Raiders in 1999.

=== Rutgers ===
In 2001, Albert got his first chance to coach at the NCAA Division I level, when he was hired by new Rutgers head coach Greg Schiano as the defensive line coach for the Scarlet Knights.

=== UMass (Second stint) ===
In 2002, Albert returned to UMass as the special teams coordinator and inside linebackers coach on Mark Whipple's staff for two seasons. During this time, he recruiting fellow Paterson, New Jersey native Victor Cruz to UMass.

=== Richmond (Second stint) ===
Albert spent the 2004 season on new Richmond head coach Dave Clawson's staff as the special team coordinator and defensive line coach.

=== Delaware ===
In December 2005, Albert was hired as the linebackers coach at Delaware by head coach K. C. Keeler, and was eventually promoted to associate head coach. While on staff, he helped lead the Blue Hens to the 2007 NCAA Division I FCS Football Championship game.

=== Jacksonville Jaguars ===
In 2010, Albert joined Jack Del Rio's staff with the Jacksonville Jaguars as the assistant defensive line coach working under defensive coordinator Mel Tucker and defensive line coach Joe Cullen.

=== Temple ===
After a season in the NFL, Albert returned to the collegiate game as the linebackers coach at Temple in 2011. While coaching for Steve Addazio, Albert coached future NFL players Tahir Whitehead, Adrian Robinson, and John Youboty.

=== Boston College ===
In 2013, Addazio was hired as the new head coach at Boston College, and he brought Albert with him as the defensive line coach. In 2015, the Eagles led the country in total defense (254.3), third down conversion defense (.241) and tackles for loss per game (9.6) while also ranking among the nation's top five in rushing defense (2nd; 82.8), scoring defense (4th; 15.3) and passing efficiency defense (5th; 104.66). During his tenure, Albert helped Boston College to bowl game appearances in 2013 (AdvoCare V100 Bowl) and 2014 (New Era Pinstripe Bowl). While with the Eagles, Albert mentored defensive end Harold Landry, who was a second-round pick by the Tennessee Titans in the 2018 NFL draft. Landry earned All-America accolades while at Boston College and established the school's single season record for quarterback sacks.

=== Duke ===
From 2016 through 2021, Albert was on David Cutcliffe's staff at Duke. Hired as the defensive line coach, Albert's defensive line tallied 29 sacks in 2016, after only managing 17 in the previous season.

In 2017, Duke's defense continued to improve, ranked second in the ACC in scoring defense and third in total defense. The Blue Devils allowed less than 25 points in 11 of their 13 games, and were one of only four ACC schools with four players to secure 9 or more tackles for loss. Albert's defensive line was led by senior captain Mike Ramsay, who later signed with the Tennessee Titans.

In February 2018, Albert was promoted to co-defensive coordinator. In an injury filled season, the Blue Devil defensive line lost four starters to season ending injuries, but Albert coached Chris Rumph II to Freshman All-America honors.

In the 2019 season, he coach Rumph II and Victor Dimukeje to All-ACC honors and Duke's defense finished 18th in the nation in sacks per game and 31st in the nation in tackles for loss. Rumph II also earned All-America honors that season.

The 2020 season was one of great success for Albert's defensive line. Rumph II and Dimukeje were both drafted in the 2021 NFL draft. Rumph II finished tied for most sacks in a single season with 8 and third on the career sacks all-time list with 17.5, and Dimukeje finished second on the career sacks all-time list with 21.5.

In 2021, the Blue Devil defense struggled mightily as the gave up over 30 points in all but two games.

=== UMass (Third stint) ===
When Don Brown was hired as the head coach at UMass, he hired Albert to return to his alma mater for a third stint as assistant head coach, special teams coordinator, and defensive line coach.

== Playing career ==
Albert was a three-year starter and an all-conference defensive lineman at UMass, graduating in 1985.

== Personal life ==
Albert and his wife, Lisa, have two children. He has degrees in political science and sociology and a master's degree in education.
