= Daniel Helm =

American football player (born 1995)

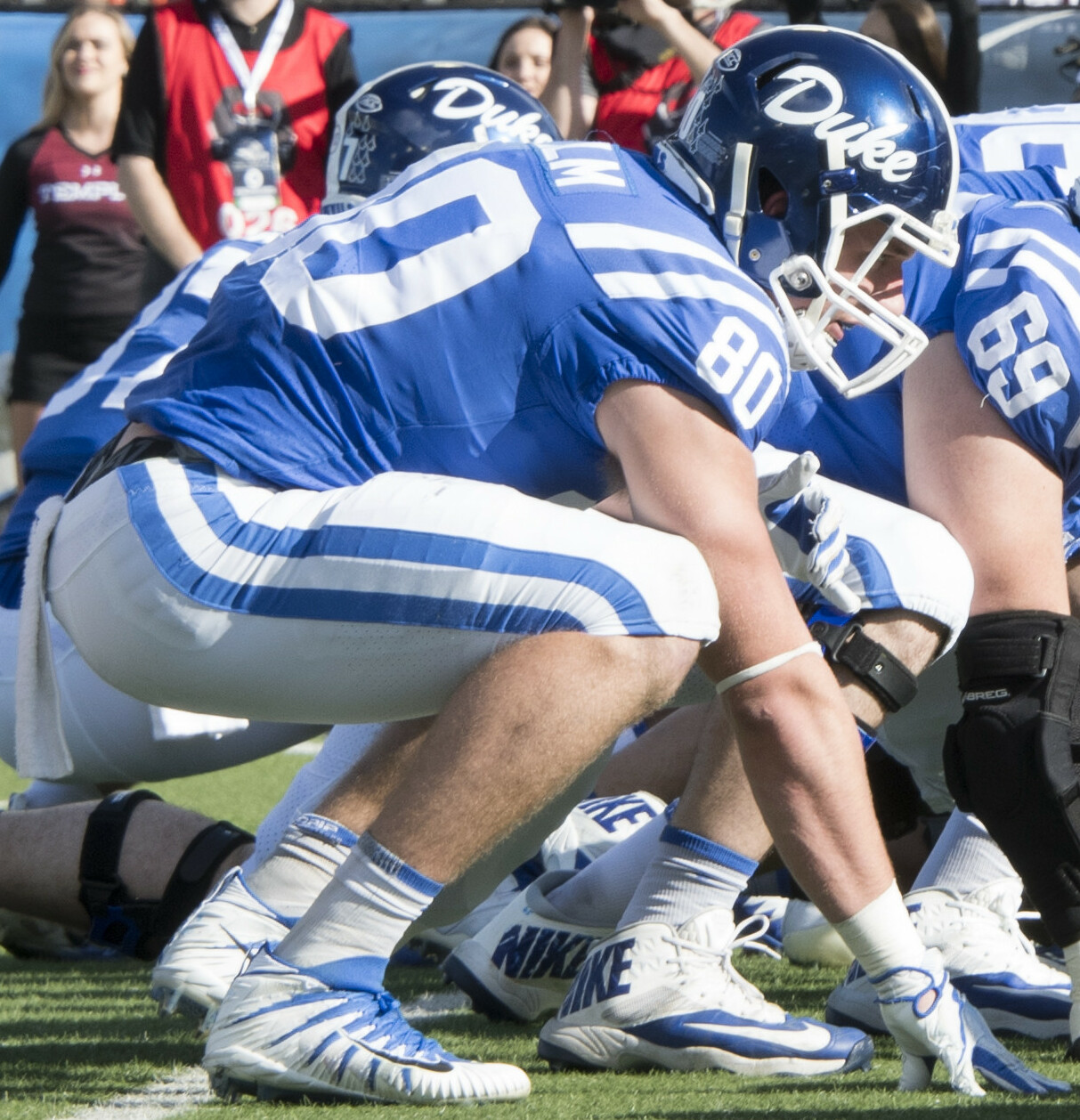
- Helm with Duke in 2018

No. 80
- Position: Tight end

Personal information
- Born: April 20, 1995 (age 31); Chatham, Illinois, U.S.
- Listed height: 6 ft 4 in (1.93 m)
- Listed weight: 255 lb (116 kg)

Career information
- High school: Glenwood (Chatham)
- College: Duke
- NFL draft: 2019: undrafted

Career history
- Los Angeles Chargers (2019)*; San Francisco 49ers (2019); Kansas City Chiefs (2020)*; Tampa Bay Buccaneers (2020)*; San Francisco 49ers (2020); Las Vegas Raiders (2021); Atlanta Falcons (2022)*; Memphis Showboats (2023); Detroit Lions (2023)*
- * Offseason or practice squad member only

Awards and highlights
- Third-team All-ACC (2018)

Career NFL statistics
- Receptions: 1
- Receiving yards: -1
- Stats at Pro Football Reference

Daniel Helm (born April 20, 1995) is an American former professional football player who was a tight end in the National Football League (NFL). He played college football for the Duke Blue Devils. He has been a member of the Los Angeles Chargers, San Francisco 49ers, Kansas City Chiefs, Tampa Bay Buccaneers, Las Vegas Raiders, Atlanta Falcons, Memphis Showboats, and Detroit Lions.

== Professional career ==
Pre-draft measurables
Height	Weight	Arm length	Hand span	40-yard dash	Bench press
6 ft 4 1/8 in (1.93 m)	249 lb (113 kg)	33 3/8 in (0.85 m)	9 1/2 in (0.24 m)	4.89 s	14 reps
All values from NFL Combine

=== Los Angeles Chargers ===
Helm was signed by the Los Angeles Chargers as an undrafted free agent on April 27, 2019. He was waived by the Chargers on August 1, 2019.

=== San Francisco 49ers (first stint) ===
Helm was claimed off waivers by the San Francisco 49ers on August 2, 2019. He was waived on August 31, 2019, during final roster cuts and was re-signed to the 49ers practice squad the following day. Helm was promoted to the 49ers active roster on December 12, 2019, following an injury to Garrett Celek, but did not play in any games. Helm was waived by the 49ers on August 15, 2020.

=== Kansas City Chiefs ===
Helm was claimed off waivers by the Kansas City Chiefs on August 16, 2020. He was waived by the Chiefs on September 5, 2020.

=== Tampa Bay Buccaneers ===
Helm was signed to the Tampa Bay Buccaneers' practice squad on September 22, 2020.

=== San Francisco 49ers (second stint) ===
Helm was signed off the Buccaneers practice squad by the 49ers on September 29, 2020. He made his NFL debut on October 18, 2020, against the Los Angeles Rams. Helm was waived on October 20, 2020, and was signed to the practice squad the next day. He was elevated to the active roster on November 5 and 14 for the team's weeks 9 and 10 games against the Green Bay Packers and New Orleans Saints, and reverted to the practice squad after each game. He was placed on the practice squad/COVID-19 list by the team on November 20, and restored to the practice squad and subsequently released on December 3. He was re-signed to the practice squad on December 9. He was elevated to the active roster again on December 19 and 25 for the weeks 15 and 16 games against the Dallas Cowboys and Arizona Cardinals, and reverted to the practice squad after each game. His practice squad contract with the team expired after the season on January 11, 2021. He was re-signed on March 17, 2021. On June 1, 2021, Helm was waived by 49ers.

=== Las Vegas Raiders ===
On October 25, 2021, Helm was signed to the Las Vegas Raiders active roster. He was released on January 8, 2022.

=== Atlanta Falcons ===
On January 20, 2022, Helm signed a reserve/future contract with the Atlanta Falcons. He was waived on May 16, 2022.

=== Memphis Showboats ===
Helm signed with the Memphis Showboats of the USFL on January 5, 2023. He was released from his contract on August 1, 2023, to sign with an NFL team.

=== Detroit Lions ===
On August 2, 2023, Helm signed with the Detroit Lions. He was waived on August 27.
