= Zac Roper =

American football coach (born 1978)

Current position
- Title: Special teams coordinator
- Team: FIU Panthers
- Conference: Conference USA

Biographical details
- Born: April 29, 1978 (age 48); Knoxville, Tennessee
- Education: Ole Miss ('01)

Coaching career (HC unless noted)
- 1996–1998: Oklahoma (SA)
- 2001–2004: Ole Miss (GA)
- 2005–2006: Cornell (STC/RB/TE)
- 2007: Cornell (STC/CB)
- 2008–2012: Duke (STC/RB)
- 2013–2015: Duke (STC/TE)
- 2016–2020: Duke (AHC/OC/QB)
- 2021: Duke (DHC/TE)
- 2022: North Carolina State (Analyst)
- 2023–present: Florida International (STC/TE)

Zac Roper (born April 29, 1978) is an American football coach. He is currently the special teams coordinator and tight ends coach at Florida International University, and was previously the offensive coordinator at Duke University. Prior to this, Roper had spent the majority of his career as a special teams coordinator. He worked with staffs at Ole Miss, Oklahoma, and Cornell before joining the Duke staff for the 2008 season.

== Coaching career ==
=== Oklahoma ===
Roper started his college coaching career as a student assistant for the Oklahoma Sooners football team from 1996-1998, before transferring to Ole Miss.

=== Ole Miss ===
Roper served as a student assistant, an administrative graduate assistant, and a graduate assistant coach at Ole Miss from 2001 through 2004. Here, he first worked for current Duke head coach, David Cutcliffe. While working as a graduate assistant coach, Roper worked with the wide receivers, tight ends, and placekickers. In 2003, Jonathan Nichols won the Lou Groza Award as the nation’s top kicker.

=== Cornell ===
Following his time at Ole Miss, Roper joined the staff at Cornell as the special teams coordinator. In addition to special teams, Roper coached the running backs and tight ends in his first two seasons with the Big Red, 2005 and 2006. During his third and final year at Cornell, Roper switched to the defensive side of the ball, and coached the cornerbacks.

=== Duke ===
In 2008, Roper rejoined David Cutcliffe at Duke. He joined the staff as the special teams coordinator and running backs coach. 2008 was also the first year for Roper’s brother, Kurt Roper, serving as the offensive coordinator for the Blue Devils. In 2013, the staffed was restructured and Roper moved from coaching the running backs, to coaching the tight ends, while continuing his special teams duties.

When Scottie Montgomery left Duke to become the head coach at East Carolina prior to the 2016 season, Roper was promoted to offensive coordinator and took over coaching the quarterbacks.

Arguably his most notable play-call as offensive coordinator came in the 2019 game versus North Carolina. On 1st and Goal down 20-17 with 18 seconds to go in the game, Roper called for his runningback Deon Jackson to throw a "jump pass" rather than electing to run the ball or use his quarterback to pass it. The playcall resulted in an interception by Chazz Surratt, preventing the Blue Devils from kicking a field goal to send the game to overtime. After the 2019 season in which Duke's offense was second to last in the league with 329.7 yards per game, Cutcliffe took play-calling duties from Roper. Following another sub-par offensive season, and a 2-9 record in 2020, Roper lost his offensive coordinator title, and switched from coaching quarterbacks to tight ends.

=== North Carolina State ===
Following Cutcliffe's retirement after the 2021 season, Roper wasn't retained by new head coach Mike Elko. Instead, he joined Dave Doeren's staff at North Carolina State as an offensive analyst for the 2022 season.

=== FIU ===
After one season at NC State, Roper returned to an on the field coaching position when he joined Mike MacIntyre's staff at FIU as the special teams coordinator and tight ends coach.

== Personal life ==
Roper and his wife, Rebecca (Harvey), have two children, Joshua and Mikayla. His father Bobby was a longtime college football assistant, who was most notably the defensive coordinator on the national champion 1976 University of Pittsburgh football team. His brother Kurt is currently the offensive coordinator/quarterbacks coach at NC State.
