= List of Duke Blue Devils football seasons =

This is a list of seasons completed by the Duke Blue Devils football team. Representing Duke University, the Blue Devils compete in the Coastal Division of the Atlantic Coast Conference in the NCAA Division I FBS. Since 1929, Duke has played their home games out of Wallace Wade Stadium in Durham, North Carolina. The Blue Devils began playing football as an independent in 1888, though the school did not field a team from 1895 to 1919. In 1930, the program joined the Southern Conference, where they captured nine conference titles in 22 years. The Blue Devils joined the ACC as a charter member in 1953, and have competed in the conference ever since.

Duke's primary rival is the North Carolina Tar Heels. The series dates back to 1888, and has been played annually since 1922. The teams compete for the Victory Bell. As of the 2018 season, North Carolina holds a 59–39–4 lead in the series.

== Seasons ==
Year	Overall	Conference	Standing	Bowl/playoffs	Rank^{#}		
John Franklin Crowell (Independent) (1888–1889)
1888	Trinity	2–1					
1889	Trinity	1–1					
No Coach (Independent) (1888–1889)
1890	Trinity	0–1					
1891	Trinity	3–0					
1892	Trinity	1–3					
1893	Trinity	3–1					
1894	Trinity	0–1					
1895 – 1919	No team						
Floyd J. Egan (Independent) (1920)
1920	Trinity	4–0–1					
James A. Baldwin (Independent) (1921)
1921	Trinity	6–1–2					
Herman G. Steiner (Independent) (1922)
1922	Trinity	7–2–1					
E. L. Alexander (Independent) (1923)
1923	Trinity	5–4					
Howard Jones (Independent) (1924)
1924	Duke	4–5					
Pat Herron (Independent) (1925)
1925	Duke	4–5					
Jimmy DeHart (Independent) (1926–1928)
1926	Duke	3–6					
1927	Duke	4–5					
1928	Duke	5–5	1–1	T–10th			
Jimmy DeHart (Southern Conference) (1929–1930)
1929	Duke	4–6	2–1	T–7th			
1930	Duke	8–1–2	4–1–1	4th			
Wallace Wade (Southern Conference) (1931–1941)
1931	Duke	5–3–2	3–3–1	T–8th			
1932	Duke	7–3	5–3	9th			
1933	Duke	9–1	4–0	1st			
1934	Duke	7–2	3–1	T–3rd			
1935	Duke	8–2	5–0	1st			
1936	Duke	9–1	7–0	1st			11
1937	Duke	7–2–1	5–1	4th			20
1938	Duke	9–1	5–0	1st	L Rose		3
1939	Duke	8–1	5–0	1st			8
1940	Duke	7–2	4–1	2nd			18
1941	Duke	9–1	5–0	1st	L Rose		2
Eddie Cameron (Southern Conference) (1942–1945)
1942	Duke	5–4–1	3–1–1	T–4th			
1943	Duke	8–1	4–0	1st			7
1944	Duke	6–4	4–0	1st	W Sugar		11
1945	Duke	6–2	4–0	1st			13
Wallace Wade (Southern Conference) (1946–1950)
1946	Duke	4–5	3–2	5th			
1947	Duke	4–3–2	3–1–1	4th			19
1948	Duke	4–3–2	3–2–1	7th			
1949	Duke	6–3	4–2	T–4th			
1950	Duke	7–3	5–2	6th			
Bill Murray (Southern Conference) (1951–1952)
1951	Duke	5–4–1	4–2	6th			
1952	Duke	8–2	5–0	1st		18	16
Bill Murray (Atlantic Coast Conference) (1953–1965)
1953	Duke	7–2–1	4–0	T–1st		18	18
1954	Duke	8–2–1	4–0	1st	W Orange	14	14
1955	Duke	7–2–1	4–0	T–1st		16	
1956	Duke	5–4–1	4–1	2nd		20	
1957	Duke	6–3–2	5–1–1	2nd	L Orange	14	16
1958	Duke	5–5	3–2	3rd			
1959	Duke	4–6	2–3	6th			
1960	Duke	8–3	5–1	1st	W Cotton	11	10
1961	Duke	7–3	5–1	1st		14	20
1962	Duke	8–2	6–0	1st		14	
1963	Duke	5–4–1	5–2	T–3rd			
1964	Duke	4–5–1	3–2–1	2nd			
1965	Duke	6–4	4–2	3rd (Note: Duke also won a share of the 1965 ACC Championship on the field, finishing tied for first with South Carolina (who they defeated) at 4–2. However, the Gamecocks were stripped of all of their league wins after it emerged they had used two ineligible players. This elevated NC State and Clemson (both of whom had lost to South Carolina) to 5–2 in the standings, ahead of 4–2 Duke. While Duke still claims the 1965 conference title, the ACC does not recognize it.)			
Tom Harp (Atlantic Coast Conference) (1966–1970)
1966	Duke	5–5	2–3	5th			
1967	Duke	4–6	2–4	6th			
1968	Duke	4–6	3–4	5th			
1969	Duke	3–6–1	3–3–1	T–3rd			
1970	Duke	6–5	5–2	T–2nd			
Mike McGee (Atlantic Coast Conference) (1971–1978)
1971	Duke	6–5	2–3	T–3rd			
1972	Duke	5–6	3–3	4th			
1973	Duke	2–8–1	1–4–1	5th			
1974	Duke	6–5	2–4	5th			
1975	Duke	4–5–2	3–0–2	2nd			
1976	Duke	5–5–1	2–3–1	4th			
1977	Duke	5–6	2–4	5th			
1978	Duke	4–7	2–4	5th			
Shirley Wilson (Atlantic Coast Conference) (1979–1982)
1979	Duke	2–8–1	0–6	7th			
1980	Duke	2–9	1–5	7th			
1981	Duke	6–5	3–3	4th			
1982	Duke	6–5	3–3	T–3rd			
Steve Sloan (Atlantic Coast Conference) (1983–1986)
1983	Duke	3–8	3–4	T–5th			
1984	Duke	2–9	1–6	T–7th			
1985	Duke	4–7	2–5	T–6th			
1986	Duke	4–7	2–5	T–6th			
Steve Spurrier (Atlantic Coast Conference) (1987–1989)
1987	Duke	5–6	2–5	7th			
1988	Duke	7–3–1	3–3–1	6th			
1989	Duke	8–4	6–1	T–1st	L All-American		
Barry Wilson (Atlantic Coast Conference) (1990–1993)
1990	Duke	4–7	1–6	7th			
1991	Duke	4–6–1	1–6	7th			
1992	Duke	2–9	0–8	9th			
1993	Duke	3–8	2–6	T–7th			
Fred Goldsmith (Atlantic Coast Conference) (1994–1998)
1994	Duke	8–4	5–3	T–3rd	L Hall of Fame		
1995	Duke	3–8	1–7	8th			
1996	Duke	0–11	0–8	9th			
1997	Duke	2–9	0–8	9th			
1998	Duke	4–7	2–6	6th			
Carl Franks (Atlantic Coast Conference) (1999–2003)
1999	Duke	3–8	3–5	T–5th			
2000	Duke	0–11	0–8	9th			
2001	Duke	0–11	0–8	9th			
2002	Duke	2–10	0–8	9th			
2003	Duke	2–5	0–4	Fired			
Ted Roof (Atlantic Coast Conference) (2003–2007)
2003	Duke	2-3	2–2	8th			
2004	Duke	2–9	1–7	T–10th			
2005	Duke	1–10	0–8	6th (Coastal)			
2006	Duke	0–12	0–8	6th (Coastal)			
2007	Duke	1–11	0–8	6th (Coastal)			
David Cutcliffe (Atlantic Coast Conference) (2008–2021)
2008	Duke	4–8	1–7	6th (Coastal)			
2009	Duke	5–7	3–5	5th (Coastal)			
2010	Duke	3–9	1–7	T–5th (Coastal)			
2011	Duke	3–9	1–7	6th (Coastal)			
2012	Duke	6–7	3–5	T–5th (Coastal)	L Belk		
2013	Duke	10–4	6–2	1st (Coastal)	L Chick-fil-A	22	23
2014	Duke	9–4	5–3	2nd (Coastal)	L Sun		
2015	Duke	8–5	4–4	T–4th (Coastal)	W Pinstripe		
2016	Duke	4–8	1–7	T–6th (Coastal)			
2017	Duke	7–6	3–5	T–4th (Coastal)	W Quick Lane		
2018	Duke	8–5	3–5	6th (Coastal)	W Independence		
2019	Duke	5–7	3–5	6th (Coastal)			
2020	Duke	2–9	1–9	T–14th			
2021	Duke	3–9	0–8	7th (Coastal)			
Mike Elko (Atlantic Coast Conference) (2022–2023)
2022	Duke	9–4	5–3	T–2nd (Coastal)	W Military		
2023	Duke	8–5	4–4	T–6th	W Birmingham		
Manny Diaz (Atlantic Coast Conference) (2024–Present)
2024	Duke	9–4	5–3	T–4th	L Gator Bowl		
2025	Duke	9–5	6–2	T–2nd	W Sun Bowl		
Total:		547–560–31					
National championship Conference title Conference division title or championship game berth
^{#}Rankings from final Coaches Poll.
