= List of Duke Blue Devils head football coaches =

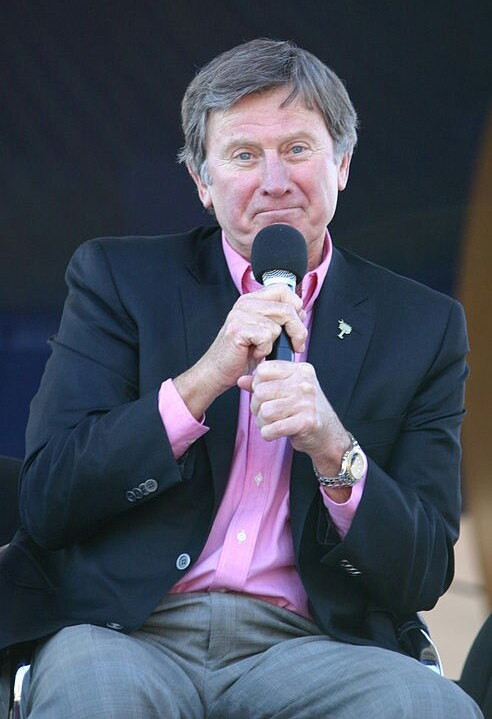
Steve Spurrier won a conference championship at Duke as head coach in 1989.

The Duke Blue Devils college football team represents Duke University in the Atlantic Coast Conference (ACC). The Blue Devils compete as part of the NCAA Division I Football Bowl Subdivision. The program has had 24 head coaches since it began play during the 1889 season. Since December 7, 2023, Manny Diaz has served as head coach at Duke.

Eight coaches have led Duke in postseason bowl games: Wallace Wade, Eddie Cameron, William D. Murray, Steve Spurrier, Fred Goldsmith, David Cutcliffe, Mike Elko, and Diaz. Five of those coaches also won conference championships: Wade captured six, Cameron three, and Murray one as a member of the Southern Conference; Murray captured six and both Spurrier and Diaz one as a member of the Atlantic Coast Conference.

Wade is the leader in seasons coached with 16 years as head coach and games won with 110. Floyd J. Egan has the highest winning percentage at 0.900. Ted Roof has the lowest winning percentage of those who have coached more than one game, with 0.118. Of the 24 different head coaches who have led the Blue Devils, Jones, Wade, Murray, McGee, and Spurrier have been inducted into the College Football Hall of Fame.

== Key ==
Key to symbols in coaches list
General		Overall		Conference		Postseason (Note: Although the first Rose Bowl Game was played in 1902, it has been continuously played since the 1916 game, and is recognized as the oldest bowl game by the NCAA. "—" indicates any season prior to 1916 when postseason games were not played.)	
No.	Order of coaches (Note: A running total of the number of head coaches, with coaches who served separate tenures being counted only once. Interim head coaches are represented with "Int" and are not counted in the running total. "—" indicates the team played but either without a coach or no coach is on record. "X" indicates an interim year without play.)	GC	Games coached	CW	Conference wins	PW	Postseason wins
DC	Division championships	OW	Overall wins	CL	Conference losses	PL	Postseason losses
CC	Conference championships	OL	Overall losses	CT	Conference ties	PT	Postseason ties
NC	National championships	OT	Overall ties (Note: Overtime rules in college football were introduced in 1996, making ties impossible in the period since.)	C%	Conference winning percentage		
†	Elected to the College Football Hall of Fame	O%	Overall winning percentage (Note: When computing the win–loss percentage, a tie counts as half a win and half a loss.)				

== Coaches ==
List of head football coaches showing season(s) coached, overall records, conference records, postseason records, championships and selected awards (Note: Statistics correct as of the end of the 2025 NCAA Division I FBS football season.)
No.	Name (Note: Duke did not have a head coach from their 1890–1895 seasons.)	Season(s) (Note: Duke did not field teams from the 1896–1919 seasons.)	GC	OW	OL	OT	O%	CW	CL	CT	C%	PW	PL	PT	CC	NC	Awards
1	John Franklin Crowell	1889–1889	5	3	2	0	0.600	—	—	—	—	—	—	—	—	—	—
2	Floyd J. Egan	1920	5	4	0	1	0.900	—	—	—	—	—	—	—	—	—	—
3	James A. Baldwin	1921	9	6	1	2	0.778	—	—	—	—	—	—	—	—	—	—
4	Herman G. Steiner	1922	10	7	2	1	0.750	—	—	—	—	—	—	—	—	—	—
5	E. L. Alexander	1923	9	5	4	0	0.556	—	—	—	—	—	—	—	—	—	—
6	Howard Jones^{†}	1924	9	4	5	0	0.444	—	—	—	—	—	—	—	—	—	—
7	James P. Herron	1925	9	4	5	0	0.444	—	—	—	—	—	—	—	—	—	—
8	Jimmy DeHart	1926–1930	49	24	23	2	0.510	7	3	1	0.682	—	—	—	0	—	—
9; 11	Wallace Wade^{†}	1931–1941; 1946–1950	153	110	36	7	0.742	68	18	3	0.781	0	2	0	6	—	—
10	Eddie Cameron	1942–1945	37	25	11	1	0.689	15	1	1	0.912	1	0	0	3	—	—
12	William D. Murray^{†}	1951–1965	153	93	51	9	0.637	63	17	2	0.780	2	1	0	7	—	—
13	Tom Harp	1966–1970	51	22	28	1	0.441	15	16	1	0.484	0	0	0	0	—	—
14	Mike McGee^{†}	1971–1978	88	37	47	4	0.443	17	25	4	0.413	0	0	0	0	—	—
15	Shirley Wilson	1979–1982	44	16	27	1	0.375	7	17	0	0.292	0	0	0	0	—	—
16	Steve Sloan	1983–1986	44	13	31	0	0.295	8	20	0	0.286	0	0	0	0	—	—
17	Steve Spurrier^{†}	1987–1989	34	20	13	1	0.603	11	9	1	0.548	0	1	0	1	—	—
18	Barry Wilson	1990–1993	44	13	30	1	0.307	4	26	0	0.133	0	0	0	0	—	—
19	Fred Goldsmith	1994–1998	56	17	39	0	0.304	8	32	0	0.200	0	1	0	0	—	Bobby Dodd COY (1994)
20	Carl Franks	1999–2003	52	7	45	—	0.135	3	33	—	0.083	0	0	—	0	—	—
21	Ted Roof	2003–2007	51	6	45	—	0.118	3	33	—	0.083	0	0	—	0	—	—
22	David Cutcliffe	2008–2021	174	77	97	—	0.443	35	79	—	0.307	3	3	—	0	—	Walter Camp COY (2013); Sporting News Co-COY (2013); Bobby Dodd COY (2013); AFCA COY (2013)
23	Mike Elko	2022–2023	25	16	9	—	0.640	9	7	—	0.563	1	0	—	0	—	—
24	Manny Diaz	2024–present	27	18	9	—	0.667	11	5	—	0.688	1	1	—	1	—	—
