= 2015 Pinstripe Bowl =

2015 New Era Pinstripe Bowl
- 6th Pinstripe Bowl
Indiana Hoosiers	Duke Blue Devils
(6–6)	(7–5)
Big Ten	ACC
41	44
Head coach: Kevin Wilson	Head coach: David Cutcliffe
	1	2	3	4	OT	Total
Indiana	0	17	14	10	0	41
Duke	10	7	10	14	3	44
- Date: December 26, 2015
- Season: 2015
- Stadium: Yankee Stadium
- Location: Bronx, New York
- MVP: Thomas Sirk (QB–Duke); Shaun Wilson (RB–Duke)
- Favorite: Indiana by 2
- Referee: Chris Coyte (Pac-12)
- Attendance: 37,218
- Payout: US$2,000,000

United States TV coverage
- Network: ABC/ESPN Radio
- Announcers: Rece Davis, Danny Kanell, Joey Galloway, & Paul Carcaterra (ESPN); Kevin Winter, Greg Buttle, & CJ Papa (ESPN Radio)

The 2015 Pinstripe Bowl was a post-season American college football bowl game played on December 26, 2015, at Yankee Stadium in the New York City borough of the Bronx. The sixth edition of the Pinstripe Bowl featured the Indiana Hoosiers of the Big Ten Conference against the Duke Blue Devils of the Atlantic Coast Conference. It began at 3:30 p.m. EST and aired on ABC. It was one of the 2015–16 bowl games that concluded the 2015 FBS football season. Sponsored by the New Era Cap Company, the game was officially known as the New Era Pinstripe Bowl. This bowl marked Duke's first bowl victory in 54 years. Although Duke had reached 4 consecutive bowl games, they had lost the previous three.

This is the most recent Pinstripe Bowl victory by an ACC team.

== Teams ==
The game featured the Indiana Hoosiers against the Duke Blue Devils.

=== Indiana Hoosiers ===
After finishing their season 6–6, Holtzman extended an invitation for the Hoosiers to play in the game, which they accepted as well.

This was the Hoosiers' tenth bowl game (they were 3–6 in bowl games previously) and their first since the 2007 Insight Bowl, where they lost to Oklahoma State by a score of 49–33. The Hoosiers sought their first bowl victory since the 1991 Copper Bowl (where they shut out Baylor 24–0).

=== Duke Blue Devils ===
After finishing their regular season 7–5, bowl director Mark Holtzman extended an invitation for the Blue Devils to play in the game, which they accepted.

This was the Blue Devils' twelfth bowl game (they were previously 3–8 in bowl games) and their fourth consecutive bowl game (their longest-and only-bowl streak in school history), where they sought their first bowl victory in 54 years (their last bowl win was when they beat Arkansas in the 1961 Cotton Bowl Classic by a score of 7–6). It was also the Blue Devils' second bowl game against an opponent from the Big Ten; their first was the 1995 Hall of Fame Bowl, where they lost to Wisconsin by a score of 34–20.

== Game summary ==
=== Scoring summary ===
Scoring summary

Quarter	Time	Drive			Team	Scoring information	Score	
Quarter	Time	Plays	Yards	TOP	Team	Scoring information	IND	DU
1	9:48	13	45	4:15	DU	52-yard field goal by Ross Martin	0	3
1	1:16	1	85	0:14	DU	Shaun Wilson 85-yard touchdown run, Ross Martin kick good	0	10
2	6:56	10	78	3:25	IND	Luke Timian 27-yard touchdown reception from Nate Sudfeld, Griffin Oakes kick good	7	10
2	1:25	6	53	2:00	IND	Devine Redding 17-yard touchdown run, Griffin Oakes kick good	14	10
2	1:00	2	73	0:25	DU	Thomas Sirk 73-yard touchdown run, Ross Martin kick good	14	17
2	0:03	7	49	0:57	IND	45-yard field goal by Griffin Oakes	17	17
3	11:00	10	59	4:00	DU	34-yard field goal by Ross Martin	17	20
3	7:11	8	59	3:49	IND	Nick Westbrook 3-yard touchdown reception from Nate Sudfeld, Griffin Oakes kick good	24	20
3	5:25	3	19	0:54	DU	Braxton Deaver 10-yard touchdown reception from Thomas Sirk, Ross Martin kick good	24	27
3	1:20	6	65	1:52	IND	Alex Rodriguez 10-yard touchdown run, Griffin Oakes kick good	31	27
4	11:12	7	43	1:42	IND	27-yard field goal by Griffin Oakes	34	27
4	10:55	–	–	–	DU	Shaun Wilson kickoff return for 98 yards, Ross Martin kick good	34	34
4	4:03	5	82	2:04	IND	Mitchell Paige 25-yard touchdown reception from Nate Sudfeld, Griffin Oakes kick good	41	34
4	0:41	13	78	3:22	DU	Thomas Sirk 5-yard touchdown run, Ross Martin kick good	41	41
OT	–	4	7	–	DU	36-yard field goal by Ross Martin	41	44
"TOP" = time of possession. For other American football terms, see Glossary of American football.							41	44

=== Statistics ===
Statistics	IND	DUKE
First downs	33	23
Plays–yards	99–667	86–536
Rushes–yards	47–281	46–382
Passing yards	389	163
Passing: Comp–Att–Int	28–51–2	17–40–3
Time of possession	31:27	28:33
