= Heather Sue Mercer–Duke Football case =

In 1997 case Mercer v. Duke University (Case Cite: 190 F.3d 643, 138 Ed. Law Rep. 113 (4th Cir. 1999)), Heather Sue Mercer, a daughter of hedge fund manager Robert Mercer, sued Duke University for discrimination after her dismissal from Duke's intercollegiate football program. Mercer had been an all-state placekicker at Yorktown High School in Yorktown Heights, New York. From 1994 through 1995, she participated in Duke's football program as a manager. Mercer challenged the federal district court's earlier decision holding that Title IX provides a blanket exemption for contact sports and the court's consequent dismissal of her claim that Duke University discriminated against her.

== Background ==
In the fall of 1994 Mercer tried out for the Duke Football team as a walk-on placekicker. Mercer was the first female to try out for Duke’s football team. Mercer initially did not make the team, but instead took a manager position on the team. In April 1995, she was made a full member of the team after she kicked a field goal that led her team to victory during an intra-squad scrimmage game. While she was on the team she did many of the conditioning drills routinely performed by football kickers.

Mercer claims that the coach Fred Goldsmith made offensive remarks about her gender. She was cut from the team in 1996, and claimed that the reason she was cut was because of her sex. This is against Duke's rules of athletics, which state: "No person shall, on the basis of sex, be excluded from participation in, be denied the benefits of, be treated differently from another person or otherwise be discriminated against in any interscholastic, intercollegiate, club or intramural athletics offered by a recipient, and no recipient shall provide any such athletics separately on such basis."

== Court's decision ==
The trial court found that the regulations of athletics do not apply to contact sports, stating that Duke University prohibited females from trying out for contact sports and that it rested upon the coach’s discretion to allow it. It stated that federally funded institutions have separate teams for men and women in many sports which included the contact sport of football.

However, the Circuit Court sided with her on appeal.
