= 1960 Virginia Cavaliers football team =

American college football season

1960 Virginia Cavaliers football
- Conference: Atlantic Coast Conference
- Record: 0–10 (0–6 ACC)
- Head coach: Dick Voris (3rd season)
- Captains: John Marlow; Fred Shepherd; Louis Martig
- Home stadium: Scott Stadium

1960 Atlantic Coast Conference football standings
| | Conf. | | | | | Overall |
| Team | W | | L | | T | W | | L | | T |
|---|---|---|---|---|---|---|---|---|---|---|
| No. 10 Duke $ | 5 | – | 1 | – | 0 | 8 | – | 3 | – | 0 |
| NC State | 4 | – | 1 | – | 1 | 6 | – | 3 | – | 1 |
| Maryland | 5 | – | 2 | – | 0 | 6 | – | 4 | – | 0 |
| Clemson | 4 | – | 2 | – | 0 | 6 | – | 4 | – | 0 |
| South Carolina | 3 | – | 3 | – | 1 | 3 | – | 6 | – | 1 |
| North Carolina | 2 | – | 5 | – | 0 | 3 | – | 7 | – | 0 |
| Wake Forest | 2 | – | 5 | – | 0 | 2 | – | 8 | – | 0 |
| Virginia | 0 | – | 6 | – | 0 | 0 | – | 10 | – | 0 |
$ – Conference champion; Rankings from AP poll

The 1960 Virginia Cavaliers football team represented the University of Virginia during the 1960 college football season. The Cavaliers were led by third-year head coach Dick Voris and played their home games at Scott Stadium in Charlottesville, Virginia. They competed as members of the Atlantic Coast Conference, finishing in last. Virginia finished without a win for the second consecutive year and extended their losing streak to 28 games, tying the NCAA record set between 1945 and 1948 by the Kansas State Wildcats. Voris, who managed just one win in three seasons at Virginia, resigned as head coach at the end of the season.

== Schedule ==
| Date | Opponent | Site | Result | Attendance | Source |
|---|---|---|---|---|---|
| September 24 | vs. William & Mary* | Foreman Field; Norfolk, VA | L 21–41 | 7,000 | |
| October 1 | at NC State | Riddick Stadium; Raleigh, NC | L 7–26 | 14,500 | |
| October 8 | at No. 8 Clemson | Memorial Stadium; Clemson, SC | L 7–21 | 14,000 | |
| October 15 | VMI* | Scott Stadium; Charlottesville, VA | L 16–30 | 21,000 | |
| October 22 | vs. Virginia Tech* | Victory Stadium; Roanoke, VA (Harvest Bowl, rivalry) | L 6–40 | 20,000 | |
| October 29 | Wake Forest^{†} | Scott Stadium; Charlottesville, VA | L 20–28 | 12,000 | |
| November 12 | at No. 8 Navy* | Navy–Marine Corps Memorial Stadium; Annapolis, MD | L 6–41 | 20,208 | |
| November 19 | Maryland | Scott Stadium; Charlottesville, VA (rivalry) | L 12–44 | 14,500 | |
| November 26 | North Carolina | Scott Stadium; Charlottesville, VA (South's Oldest Rivalry) | L 8–35 | 8,000 | |
| December 3 | at South Carolina | Carolina Stadium; Columbia, SC | L 0–26 | 14,000 | |
*Non-conference game; ^{†}Homecoming; Rankings from AP Poll released prior to the game
