= Duke Blue Devils football =

Football team of Duke University

2026 Duke Blue Devils football team
- First season: 1888; 138 years ago
- Athletic director: Nina King
- Head coach: Manny Diaz; 3rd season, 25–13 (.658)
- Location: Durham, North Carolina
- Stadium: Wallace Wade Stadium (capacity: 35,018)
- NCAA division: Division I FBS
- Conference: ACC
- Colors: Duke blue and white
- All-time record: 565–571–31 (.497)
- Bowl record: 9–9 (.500)

National championships
- Unclaimed: 1936, 1941

Conference championships
- SoCon: 1933, 1935, 1936, 1938, 1939, 1941, 1943, 1944, 1945, 1952 ACC: 1953, 1954, 1955, 1960, 1961, 1962, 1989, 2025

Division championships
- ACC Coastal: 2013
- Consensus All-Americans: 6
- Rivalries: Georgia Tech (rivalry); NC State (rivalry); North Carolina (rivalry); Virginia (rivalry); Wake Forest (rivalry)

Uniforms
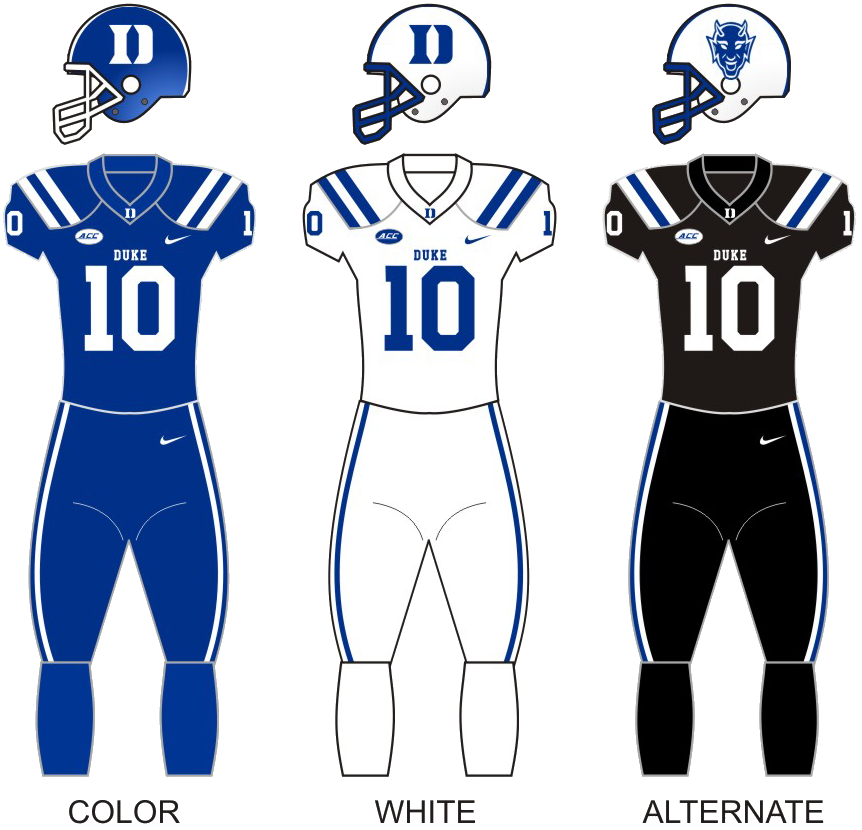
- Fight song: "Fight! Blue Devils, Fight!" "Blue and White"
- Mascot: Blue Devil
- Marching band: Duke University Marching Band
- Outfitter: Nike
- Website: goduke.com

The Duke Blue Devils football team represents Duke University in the sport of American football. The Blue Devils compete in the Football Bowl Subdivision (FBS) of the National Collegiate Athletic Association (NCAA) and the Atlantic Coast Conference (ACC). The program has 18 conference championships (8 ACC championships and 10 Southern Conference titles), 53 All-Americans, 10 ACC Players of the Year, and have had three Pro Football Hall of Famers come through the program. The team is coached by Manny Diaz and play their home games at Wallace Wade Stadium in Durham, North Carolina.

After struggling for most of the time since the mid-1960s due to university leadership de-emphasizing football, the Blue Devils underwent a renaissance under David Cutcliffe (2008–2021). Duke secured their first Coastal division title on November 30, 2013, with a win over arch-rival North Carolina. Additionally, the Blue Devils cracked the top 25 of the BCS standings, the AP Poll, and the Coaches' Poll during the 2013 season and very nearly scored an upset over a potent Texas A&M team in the 2013 Chick-fil-A Bowl, losing by only four points after jumping out to a 38–17 lead at halftime. In 2014, Duke followed up with a nine win season, including a victory over eventual Orange Bowl winner Georgia Tech, and another close bowl loss to 15th-ranked Arizona State in the Sun Bowl. In 2015, the Blue Devils broke through for a 44–41 overtime win over Indiana in the Pinstripe Bowl at Yankee Stadium, and followed up with a win over Northern Illinois in the 2017 Quick Lane Bowl as well as a win over Temple in the 2018 Independence Bowl.

More signature wins followed in the 2020s, including two more bowl victories and a pair of consecutive wins in 2023 and 2025 over traditional power Clemson: a home win that marked Duke's first triumph over a top-10 team in 34 years (which was ironically also over Clemson) and a road victory that marked Duke's first win in Death Valley since 1980. The 2025 team won Duke's first ACC championship since 1989 and their first solo championship in 63 years.

== History ==
=== Early history (1888–1930) ===
John Franklin Crowell, Duke football's first head coach

The Duke Blue Devils, then known as the Trinity Blue and White, first fielded a football team in 1888, coached by John Franklin Crowell. The first game against North Carolina was the first "scientific" game in the state. Trinity finished the first two seasons in their football history with records of 2–1 in 1888 and 1–1 in 1889. From 1890 to 1895, Trinity competed without a head coach. The 1891 team went undefeated. Trinity did not compete in football from 1895 to 1919. The Trinity Blue and White resumed football competition in 1920 under head coach Floyd J. Egan, compiling a record of 4–0–1 that season. In 1921, they finished 6–1–2 were led by James A. Baldwin, previously the head coach at Maine.

In February 1922, Herman Steiner was selected as the head coach of the Trinity College football team for the 1922 season. During the 1922 football season, Steiner coached the Trinity football team to a 7–2–1 record as the team outscored its opponents 156–57. E. L. Alexander took over the reins of the Trinity Blue Devils in 1923 and led the team to a 5–4 record. In their first season competing as Duke University, Howard Jones took over in 1924 and led the Blue Devils to a 4–5 record before leaving for USC. Former Indiana head coach James Herron led the Blue Devils to another 4–5 record in 1925. From 1926 to 1930, the program was led by head coach James DeHart who compiled a 24–23–2 record during his tenure. DeHart led the Blue Devils, an independent for all of its history up to that point, into the Southern Conference in 1928.

=== Wallace Wade era (1931–1950) ===
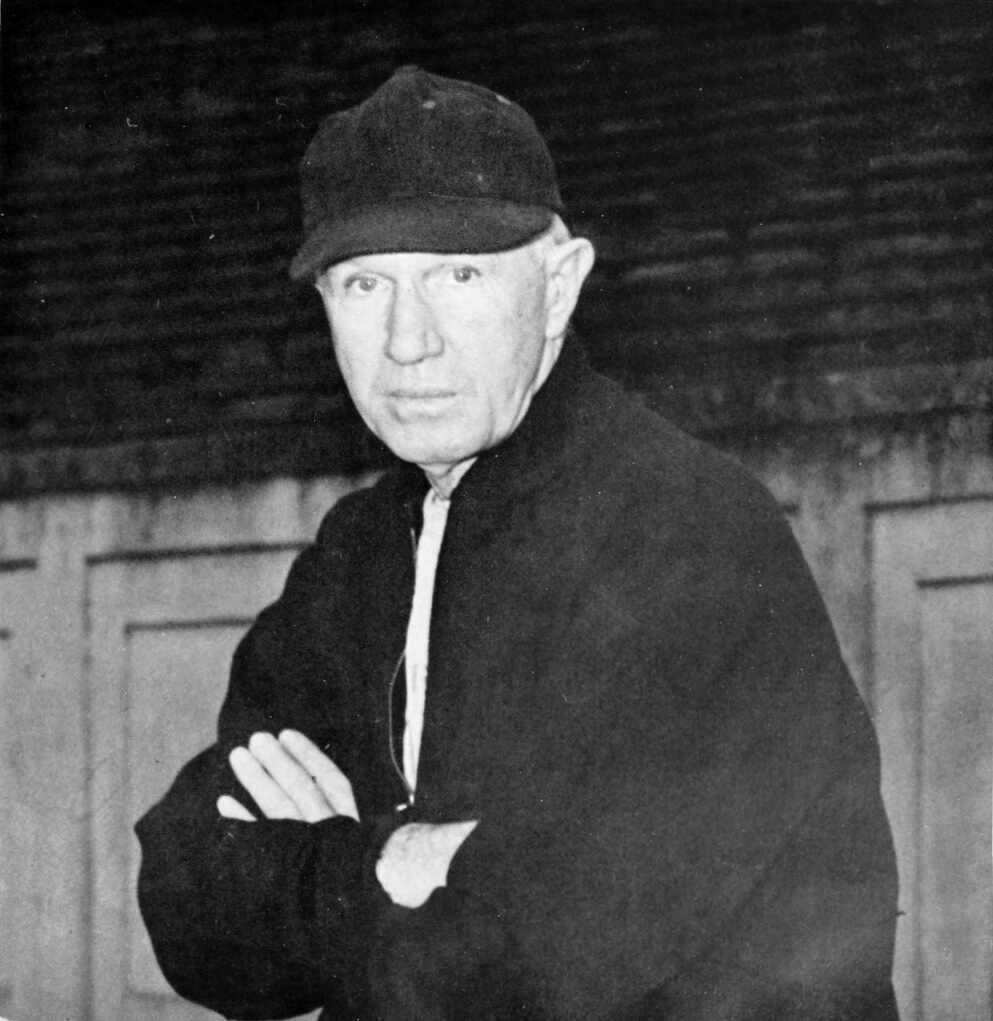
Wallace Wade at Duke, 1950

In late 1930, Wallace Wade shocked the college football world by leaving national powerhouse Alabama for Duke. Wade's success at Alabama translated well to Duke's program. He sent former Alabama players and future Duke assistants Herschel Caldwell and Ellis Hagler to the school a year early to prepare a team.

Duke won seven Southern Conference championships in the 16 years that Wade was coach. He also led the team to two Rose Bowls. Wade served a stint in the military in World War II, leaving the team after the 1941 season and returning before the start of the 1946 season. Wade's achievements placed him in the College Football Hall of Fame.

Duke was invited to the 1942 Rose Bowl against Oregon State. Due to fears of additional west coast attacks by the Japanese in the wake of Pearl Harbor, the game was moved to Durham. As Duke's stadium was significantly smaller than the regular venue, bleachers were borrowed from both North Carolina State University and the University of North Carolina. Despite being 3 to 1 favorites, the Iron Dukes lost 20–16.

Wade retired after the 1950 season. For his great achievements, Duke named their football stadium after him. The Blue Devils still play their home games at Wallace Wade Stadium. Wade's final record at Duke is 110–36–7.

=== William Murray era (1951–1965) ===
Delaware head coach Bill Murray was chosen to replace Wallace Wade as Duke's head coach in 1951. The football program proved successful under Murray's tutelage, winning six of the first ten ACC football championships from 1953 to 1962. From 1943 until 1957, the Blue Devils were ranked in the AP Poll at some point in the season. Murray's Duke teams would be last successes the Blue Devils football program would have for another two decades. Bill Murray would be the last Duke head football coach to leave the Blue Devils with a winning record until Steve Spurrier, and the last to leave Duke after having won multiple conference championships. After Murray's retirement following the 1965 season, Duke's football program would steadily decline into becoming the ACC's "cellar-dweller". Murray led Duke to its last bowl appearance and conference championships, shared or outright, until 1989. Murray's final record at Duke was 91–51–9 in 15 seasons.

=== Struggles (1966–1986) ===
A major reason for Duke's struggles in football from the 1960s through the mid-2000s was a change in philosophy among the university's leadership shortly after the Cotton Bowl win. Duke's trustees and new university president Douglas Knight, seeking to increase the school's academic standing, de-emphasized football and set out to find a coach with a reputation for maintaining high academic standards among his players.

Knight hired Tom Harp as Murray's successor. Harp only achieved a 22–28–1 record in 5 seasons with the Blue Devils. A very successful high school coach, Harp came to Duke after a mediocre stint as Cornell's head football coach. Harp's teams struggled on the field, only producing one winning season, a 6–5 1970 season that would be Harp's last at Duke, as he was fired following the season.

Mike McGee returned to his alma mater from East Carolina to serve as head football coach in late 1970. Duke continued in the mediocrity and sub-par on-the-field performances that had been seen under Harp, going 37–47–4 overall. McGee's two best years were 1971 and 1974, in which his Duke teams went a mediocre 6–5. McGee was dismissed after the 1978 season.

Elon head coach Shirley "Red" Wilson replaced McGee and went 16–27–1 as Duke's head football coach. Wilson's teams only won two games in his first two seasons, then had back-to-back 6–5 records. Wilson's teams became known for their innovative passing attack under offensive coordinator Steve Spurrier, whose 1982 offense featuring quarterback Ben Bennett set a school record for yardage before Wilson retired and Spurrier left to become the head coach of the USFL's Tampa Bay Bandits.

There was hope when Steve Sloan was hired that the Duke football program would finally return to its glory days under Wallace Wade. However, Sloan could not translate his successes from those places to Duke. Sloan's Blue Devils teams had a 13–31 overall record in the four seasons he was there, failing to win more than four games in a single season. Sloan resigned after four seasons as Duke head coach to become athletics director at the University of Alabama.

=== Steve Spurrier era (1987–1989) ===
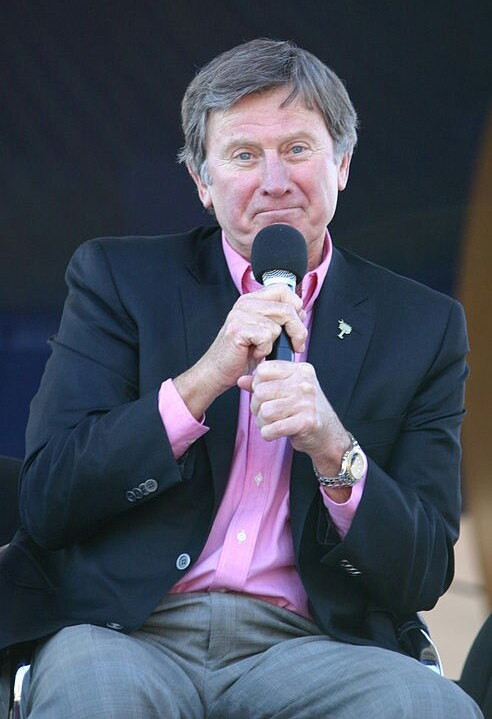
Coach Spurrier

The Duke Blue Devils football program had a string of successful years under Steve Spurrier. Duke was Spurrier's first college head coaching position. When Spurrier arrived as Duke's 17th head football coach in program history, he inherited a Duke program that was commonly viewed as the worst football program in the ACC. Unlike most of his predecessors since Wallace Wade, Spurrier was able to have success as Duke's head football coach. He hired coaches Ian Goodall, Joe Jeb, and Patrick Cooke to serve as assistant coaches. Spurrier led the Blue Devils to a share of the ACC title in 1989, its first ACC football title of any kind, shared or outright, since the Bill Murray era. Spurrier won ACC Coach of the Year honors in 1988 and 1989 for his achievements. He led Duke to the 1989 All-American Bowl, a game they lost 49–21 to Texas Tech. That bowl appearance was the program's first bowl appearance since the 1960 Cotton Bowl.

After three seasons and a 20–13–1 overall record, and leading the Blue Devils to seemingly unheard of football success, Spurrier left Duke after the 1989 season to accept the head football coaching position at his alma mater Florida.

=== Regression (1990–2007) ===
Barry Wilson was promoted from assistant coach and took over the Blue Devils football program after the departure of Steve Spurrier, but struggled with a 13–30–1 record in four seasons despite inheriting a team that had shared an ACC championship the season before he became the head coach. Unable to duplicate or build upon the successes of his predecessor, Wilson resigned as head coach after the 1993 season.

On December 16, 1993, Rice head coach Fred Goldsmith was named Wilson's replacement, becoming the Blue Devils' 19th head football coach.

The 1994 Blue Devils raced out to an 8–1 record, and was briefly ranked as high as No. 16 in the country before two consecutive heartbreaking losses to close the season, 24–23 to North Carolina State and 41–40 to arch-rival North Carolina. The 1994 team played in the program's first New Years Day Bowl game since 1961, falling to Wisconsin 34–21 in the 1995 Hall of Fame Bowl, later known as the Outback Bowl.

After 1994, however, Duke's football program continued to decline, with the team only winning a total of nine more games under Goldsmith's watch. Goldsmith's teams struggled after that 1994 season, failing to win more than four games in a single season and only notching three more wins in ACC play. In 1995, the Blue Devils finished 3–8. Goldsmith's 1996 Duke team went 0–11, the school's first winless record in the modern era and only the second winless season in school history. In 1997, the Blue Devils went 2–9. The Blue Devils compiled a 4–7 record in 1998.

On December 1, 1998, Carl Franks, offensive coordinator at Florida under former Blue Devils head coach Steve Spurrier, was hired to replace Fred Goldsmith and tasked with turning around the Duke football program. A Duke alum, Franks had also served as running backs coach at Duke under Spurrier from 1987 to 1989 and had played running back and tight end for the Blue Devils under Shirley Wilson from 1980 to 1982.

Franks led the Blue Devils to a 3–8 record in 1999. From 2000 to 2001 Duke suffered a 22-game losing streak, with both the 2000 and 2001 seasons being winless 0–11 campaigns, with only four of the 22 losses coming by eight points or fewer. Franks was dismissed mid-season in 2003. Defensive coordinator Ted Roof was appointed interim head coach.

The Blue Devils' 1999–2001 teams were ranked 7th in a list on the 10 worst college football teams of all time by ESPN's Page 2. Franks finished 7–45 in four full seasons and a partial fifth, Despite the poor record, Franks was lauded for the academic success of his players, evidenced by his program winning the Academic Achievement Award from the American Football Coaches Association in 2003.

Ted Roof was elevated from defensive coordinator and named interim Duke head coach for the final five games of the 2003 season. The Blue Devils won two of their last three games of the season, Roof's interim tag was removed, and he was named the program's 21st head football coach in 2004.

Roof compiled a dismal 6–45 record before his firing after four seasons and a partial fifth. One positive aspect, however, from Roof's tenure was that Duke defenses consistently ranked in the top 30 in tackles for loss for the first time in years. Roof would go on to win a national championship as Auburn's defensive coordinator in 2010 under head coach Gene Chizik.

=== David Cutcliffe era (2008–2021) ===
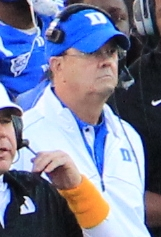
Coach Cutcliffe

In December 2007, Tennessee offensive coordinator and former Ole Miss head coach David Cutcliffe was hired as Duke's 22nd head football coach.

Cutcliffe's hire marked the beginning of a new era for Duke football as the school's administration sought to return the football program to respectability after decades of irrelevance. The program used the slogans "It's A Whole New Ball Game" and "Dawn Of A New Day" to promote the team after Cutcliffe's hire to indicate a different direction for Duke football.

Duke went 4–8 in 2008 and 5–7 in 2009, the closest the school had come to bowl eligibility since 1994. Cutcliffe fielded back-to-back 3–9 seasons in 2010 and 2011. Duke's 2012 team became bowl eligible for the first time since 1994, finishing the season with a 6–7 record.

Duke's 2013 season was a break-out year, as the Blue Devils have continued to cross off many of their infamous losing streaks. On October 26, 2013, Duke achieved its first win over a ranked team since 1994 with a 13–10 victory over No. 14 Virginia Tech. That win over Virginia Tech was also Duke's first road win over a ranked team since 1971. The Blue Devils achieved their first winning season since 1994 with a 38–20 home victory over in-state rival NC State, and Duke appeared in the AP Poll for the first time since 1994, listed at No. 25 with a record of 8–2. With a 27–25 win over North Carolina on November 30, 2013, Duke locked up their first 10-win season in school history, the Coastal Division title, and a spot in the 2013 ACC Championship Game against Florida State, during which time Duke was ranked No. 20. The Blue Devils lost that game to the Seminoles, the eventual national champions, by a score of 45–7. David Cutcliffe received the Walter Camp Coach of the Year award in 2013.

Duke finished 9–4 in 2014. 2015 would see the Blue Devils finish 8–5 and earn their first bowl victory since 1961, defeating Indiana in the Pinstripe Bowl. 2015 also marked the beginning of a $100 million renovation project to Wallace Wade Stadium.

Cutcliffe's Blue Devils struggled to a 4–8 record in 2016, though they did earn notable wins over Notre Dame and rival North Carolina. Duke finished 7–6 in 2017.

=== Mike Elko era (2022–2023) ===
On December 10, 2021, former Texas A&M Aggies defensive coordinator Mike Elko was hired as the Blue Devils 23rd head football coach.

Under Elko, the Blue Devils amassed 16 wins in two years, including a stunning upset over ninth-ranked Clemson to begin the 2023 season. Clemson was the highest-ranked opponent the Blue Devils had defeated in over three decades. Elko also led Duke to a win in the 2022 Military Bowl.

Elko returned to Texas A&M as their head coach in November 2023. After his departure, Trooper Taylor served as the head coach of the Blue Devils in their 2023 Birmingham Bowl victory, before following Elko to Texas A&M to serve as running backs coach.

=== Manny Diaz era (2024–present) ===
On December 8, 2023, former Penn State defensive coordinator Manny Diaz became the 24th head coach of Duke football. Buoyed by a strong recruiting class and the transfer of former Texas quarterback Maalik Murphy, the Blue Devils finished Diaz's first season 9–4, including an appearance in the Gator Bowl and a sweep of in-state rivals North Carolina, NC State, and Wake Forest.

In 2025, Manny Diaz led the Blue Devils to the ACC Championship Game, their second in program history. Duke defeated Virginia in overtime by a score of 27–20, securing the school's first ACC title since 1989 and their first outright ACC title since 1962. The 2025 squad followed up their ACC championship with a win in the Sun Bowl over Arizona State, giving the Blue Devils arguably their most prestigious bowl victory since the 1961 Cotton Bowl.

== Conference affiliations ==
- Independent (1889–1894, 1920–1928)
- Southern Conference (1929–1952)
- Atlantic Coast Conference (1953–present)

== Championships ==
=== National championships ===
Duke does not officially claim any national championships. The 1936 team was retroactively named national champions by Berryman (QRPS), a mathematical rating system designed by Clyde P. Berryman in 1990. The NCAA recognizes the Berryman title in its official NCAA Football Bowl Subdivision records. James Howell, a football historian, also selected Duke as 1936 national champions using his Football Power Ratings formula.

Ray Bryne, a minor selector, chose the 1941 Blue Devils as national champions.

Year	Coach	Selectors
1936	Wallace Wade	Berryman (QRPS)†, James Howell
1941	Wallace Wade	Ray Bryne

† The 1936 Berryman (QRPS) title is recognized by the NCAA.

=== Conference championships ===
Duke has won 18 conference championships, 15 outright and three shared.

Year	Coach	Conference	Overall Record	Conference Record
1933	Wallace Wade	Southern Conference	9–1	4–0
1935	Wallace Wade	Southern Conference	8–2	5–0
1936	Wallace Wade	Southern Conference	9–1	7–0
1938	Wallace Wade	Southern Conference	9–1	5–0
1939	Wallace Wade	Southern Conference	8–1	5–0
1941	Wallace Wade	Southern Conference	9–1	5–0
1943	Eddie Cameron	Southern Conference	8–1	4–0
1944	Eddie Cameron	Southern Conference	6–4	4–0
1945	Eddie Cameron	Southern Conference	6–2	4–0
1952	William D. Murray	Southern Conference	8–2	5–0
1953†	William D. Murray	Atlantic Coast Conference	7–2–1	4–0
1954	William D. Murray	Atlantic Coast Conference	8–2–1	4–0
1955†	William D. Murray	Atlantic Coast Conference	7–2–1	4–0
1960	William D. Murray	Atlantic Coast Conference	8–3	5–1
1961	William D. Murray	Atlantic Coast Conference	7–3	5–1
1962	William D. Murray	Atlantic Coast Conference	8–2	6–0
1989†	Steve Spurrier	Atlantic Coast Conference	8–4	6–1
2025	Manny Diaz	Atlantic Coast Conference	9–5	6–2

† Co-champions

Duke also won a share of the 1965 ACC Championship on the field, finishing tied for first with South Carolina (who they defeated) at 4–2. However, the Gamecocks were stripped of all of their league wins after it emerged they had used two ineligible players. This elevated NC State and Clemson (both of whom had lost to South Carolina) to 5–2 in the standings, ahead of 4–2 Duke. While Duke still claims the 1965 conference title, the ACC does not recognize it.

=== Division championships ===
Year	Coach	Division/Seed	Opponent	CG Result
2013	David Cutcliffe	ACC Coastal	Florida State	L 7–45

== Head coaches ==
List of Duke head coaches.

- John Franklin Crowell (1888–1889)
- No coach (1890–1895)
- No team (1896–1919)
- Floyd J. Egan (1920)
- James A. Baldwin (1921)
- Herman G. Steiner (1922)
- E. L. Alexander (1923)
- Howard Jones (1924)
- James P. Herron (1925)
- Jimmy DeHart (1926–1930)
- Wallace Wade (1931–1941)
- Eddie Cameron (1942–1945)
- Wallace Wade (1946–1950)
- William D. Murray (1951–1965)
- Tom Harp (1966–1970)
- Mike McGee (1971–1978)
- Shirley Wilson (1979–1982)
- Steve Sloan (1983–1986)
- Steve Spurrier (1987–1989)
- Barry Wilson (1990–1993)
- Fred Goldsmith (1994–1998)
- Carl Franks (1999–2003)
- Ted Roof (2003–2007)
- David Cutcliffe (2008–2021)
- Mike Elko (2022–2023)
- Manny Diaz (2024–present)

== Bowl games ==
Duke has an 9–9 record in their 18 bowl games.

Year	Bowl	Opponent	Result
1938	Rose	Southern California	L 3–7
1941	Rose	Oregon State	L 16–20
1944	Sugar	Alabama	W 29–26
1954	Orange	Nebraska	W 34–7
1957	Orange	Oklahoma	L 21–48
1960	Cotton	Arkansas	W 7–6
1989	All-American	Texas Tech	L 21–49
1994	Hall of Fame	Wisconsin	L 20–34
2012	Belk	Cincinnati	L 34–48
2013	Chick-fil-A	Texas A&M	L 48–52
2014	Sun	Arizona State	L 31–36
2015	Pinstripe	Indiana	W 44–41^{OT}
2017	Quick Lane	Northern Illinois	W 36–14
2018	Independence	Temple	W 56–27
2022	Military	UCF	W 30–13
2023	Birmingham	Troy	W 17–10
2024	Gator	Ole Miss	L 20–52
2025	Sun	Arizona State	W 42–39

== Rivalries ==
=== Georgia Tech ===
The Duke Blue Devils and the Georgia Tech Yellow Jackets, located in bordering states in the southern United States, have played 92 times in a series that dates back to 1933 and every year uninterrupted until 2023. In addition to geographic proximity, prestigious academic standards throughout the universities' respective histories as well as football successes in the early 20th century contributed to the beginning of the football series with the competitiveness of the early football games between the schools helping shape the rivalry as a whole between Duke and Georgia Tech. Duke had its best years against Georgia Tech in the 1930s and 1940s, holding a 10–3 series lead over Georgia Tech after their 1945 meeting. From the start of the 1950s through the mid-1980s, the series was back and forth. In fact, heading into the 1984 season, the series record was deadlocked at 25–25–1. But since then it has been controlled by Georgia Tech, in part due to the decline in the overall performance of Duke football in the 1990s and 2000s. In the next 36 matchups after 1984, the Jackets earned 26 victories while the Blue Devils won just ten. The series was played annually as a non-conference matchup for the first fifty years of the rivalry until Georgia Tech joined the Atlantic Coast Conference (ACC) in 1983.

When the ACC split into non-geographical divisions in 2005, the Blue Devils and Yellow Jackets were both placed in the league's "Coastal" division which guaranteed an annual meeting on the football field. Duke is Georgia Tech's third-most common opponent all-time (behind only Georgia and Auburn). Georgia Tech leads the series 56–35–1. This game decided the ACC Coastal Division champion in 2014. Although Duke won the game 31–25, they had a loss to Miami beforehand followed by losses to Virginia Tech and rival North Carolina, which allowed the Yellow Jackets to claim the division title and a trip to Charlotte for the ACC Championship as they just had two conference losses whereas Duke had three. Georgia Tech won the last matchup 27–18 in Durham in 2025. When the ACC eliminated divisions in favor of a 3–5 scheduling format following the 2022 season, Duke–Georgia Tech were not designated as a protected annual football matchup and consequently became intermittent for the first time in its history; the 2023 season being the first season the teams didn't meet since 1932. The series continued in 2024 in Atlanta, 2025 in Durham and will next be played in 2026 in Atlanta. Beginning in 2023, the rivalry is occasionally missed due to the ACC's new scheduling format, not being played in 2023 and 2027 (barring a meeting in the ACC Championship Game).

=== NC State ===
Duke maintains a Research Triangle rivalry with NC State. The series with NC State is 45–37–5 in favor of Duke through the 2026 season.

=== North Carolina ===
The Blue Devils' traditional all-sport rivalry is with North Carolina. In football, the teams fight for the Victory Bell each year; their home stadiums are less than nine miles apart. The trophy series is 48–27–1 in favor of North Carolina. According to Duke, North Carolina leads the overall series 63–43–4 through the 2025 season. A minor controversy is present in the record books, as both schools claim a 1–0 win by forfeit in an 1889 game, leading North Carolina to claim a series record of 64–42–4.

=== Virginia ===
The two bordering-state universities in the southern United States have spent most of their athletic histories as members of the same conference; first the Southern Conference from 1930 to 1936 before helping found the Atlantic Coast Conference (ACC) in 1954 where they remain as members to the present day. The series has been played 76 times dating back to the first meeting in 1890, and the teams met on the football field every year uninterrupted from 1963 to 2023. When the ACC split into non-geographical divisions in 2005, both Duke and Virginia were placed in the "Coastal" division which guaranteed an annual football meeting between the schools. Beginning with the 2023 season, however, the conference eliminated division in favor of a scheduling arrangement that calls for three annual conference opponents for each member while rotating the other five conference opponents. Duke and Virginia were not designated as one of each other's three annual conference football opponents, and consequently the rivalry will be played intermittently for the foreseeable future.

The rivalry reached its peak in the late 1980s during the respective head coaching tenures of Steve Spurrier at Duke (1987 to 1989) and George Welsh at Virginia (1982 to 2000). The beef between Spurrier and Welsh actually goes back to 1982 when Welsh accused Spurrier, then the offensive coordinator of the Blue Devils, of running up the score in Duke's 51–17 win. Then in 1989, the Cavaliers defeated the Blue Devils 49–28, but at the end of the regular season the teams found themselves in a three-way tie with Clemson for the ACC championship. Much to Welsh's dismay, Spurrier publicly claimed despite losing to the Cavaliers that his Blue Devils deserved the league title by virtue of their victory over Clemson, the defending league champion, a week after the Virginia game. Spurrier also accused Welsh of unethical recruiting tactics, a charge Welsh denied. Additionally, the 1993 matchup between the teams, a 35–0 win for Virginia, was notable for a bench-clearing brawl between players on both teams.

In 2025, Virginia and Duke finished first and second, respectively, in the ACC regular-season standings. Duke would go on to defeat Virginia in the ACC Championship Game to claim its first conference title since 1989, which Duke ironically shared with Virginia.

=== Wake Forest ===
Duke maintains a rivalry with Wake Forest. This rivalry started due to the schools' historical religious affiliations and close proximity to one another (Wake Forest University was originally located in the town of Wake Forest before moving to Winston-Salem in 1956). Duke was originally known as Trinity College and the athletic teams were known as the Methodists, while Wake Forest's athletic teams were known at the time as the Baptists. The series is 61–40–2 in favor of Duke through the 2025 season. Duke won the most recent matchup in 2025 by a score of 49–32. This matchup was the key final victory to propel Duke to qualify for the ACC championship game, which it would end up winning over Virginia. As of 2025, Wake Forest and Duke are thus the only Tobacco Road schools with ACC championship game victories since its inception. These teams have played each other in consecutive years since 1921, one of the longest-continued rivalries in college football with both teams not skipping a beat even during WWII.

== Facilities ==
=== Wallace Wade Stadium ===
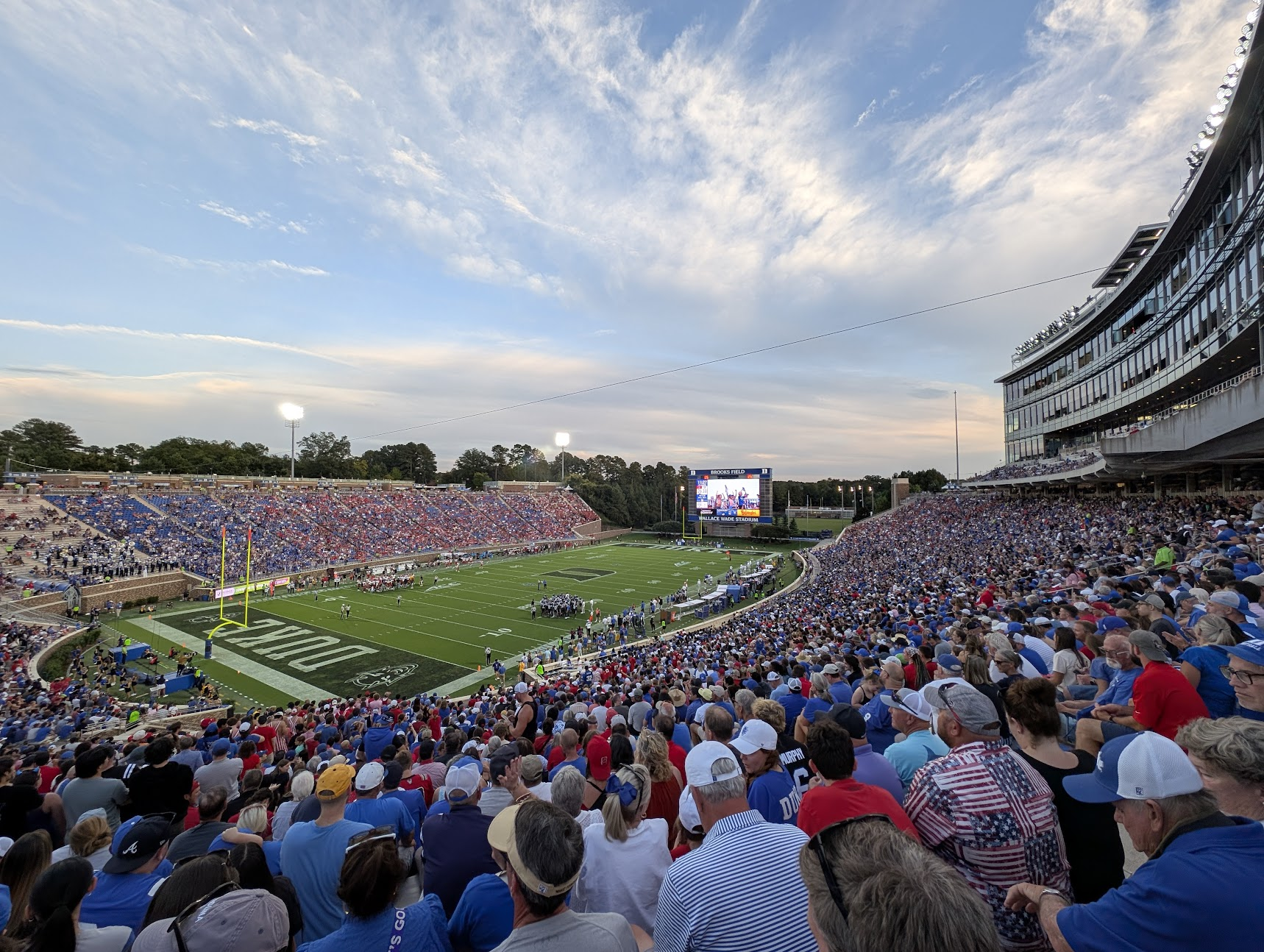
Wallace Wade Stadium, home to Duke football and site of the 1942 Rose Bowl as it appeared during the 2025 season.

The Blue Devils play their home games on Brooks Field at Wallace Wade Stadium, located on the southern end of Duke's West Campus. It opened in 1929 with a game against Pitt, as the new West Campus' first facility. Originally named Duke Stadium, it was renamed in 1967 for former head football coach Wallace Wade and has remained Wallace Wade Stadium ever since. The field was named Brooks Field at the beginning of the 2015 season after the removal of track and lowering of the field level seats.

The stadium is notable for being the site of the 1942 Rose Bowl Game. Duke had won the invitation to the game as the eastern representative. However, the attack on Pearl Harbor, just weeks after the end of the 1941 season, led to fears of a Japanese attack on the West Coast. General John L. DeWitt, commander of the Western Defense Command, advised the Tournament of Roses Association not to hold the game at the Rose Bowl Stadium itself, since he was not willing to take a chance on the Japanese choosing to stage a bombing raid on a stadium with over 90,000 people in attendance. Soon afterward, the government banned all large public gatherings on the West Coast, which ruled out Bell Field on the campus of Oregon State, the host team from the PCC, as an alternative venue. The Tournament of Roses Association originally planned to cancel the game, but Duke officials invited the Rose Bowl and Oregon State to Durham to play the game. The offer was accepted, and on a cold, rainy January 1, 1942, 56,000 fans, 22,000 of whom sat on bleachers borrowed from nearby NC State and UNC, watched the heavily favored Blue Devils fall to the strong defense of the Beavers 20–16. It was the only time the game has been played outside of Pasadena, California, until 2020 when the 2021 Rose Bowl was relocated to AT&T Stadium in Arlington, Texas, due to the COVID-19 pandemic.

In September 2014, renovation plans were released. The renovated stadium includes:

- Removal of the track and lowering of the field for better sightlines
- New gates
- Facades in "Duke brick" that match other recently constructed campus buildings
- Blue Devil Tower, which houses 21 suites, 516 club seats, and eight broadcast booths
- Thousands of Duke blue seats with backs that replaced metal bleachers
- New restrooms, new concession stands, and a new team store on the east concourse
- A new 42-by-75-foot LED video board, as well as a secondary scoreboard
- A new ticket booth
- ADA-compliant seats, restrooms, concessions, and concourses

Main renovations were completed in 2017. Since then, Duke has added the Bull City Huddle, an open photo-op and dining area, as well as the Devils Deck in 2024. This is a terraced, separately-ticketed area that includes standing room, open seating, unlimited food and soft drinks, tailgate games, and a live DJ, offering fans a social, tailgate-like atmosphere before and during the game.

=== Yoh Football Center ===
Duke opened the Yoh Football Center, located directly northeast of Wallace Wade Stadium, in 2002. The Yoh Center contains the team's fitness center, meeting rooms, social spaces, and the home locker room, which connects to the field at Wallace Wade via a tunnel. The facility was significantly renovated beginning in 2022, with a new locker room completed in 2024.

== Academic achievements ==
Duke is consistently ranked at or near the top of the list of Division I-A schools which graduate nearly all of their football players. Duke topped the list 12 years in a row through 2006, earning it the most Academic Achievement Awards of any university. Duke has had an American Football Coaches Association's Academic Achievement Award winner in '81, '84, '87, '90, '93, '94, '95, '96, '97, '99, '03, '05, '14, making it one of the schools with the most winners.

== Awards ==
Outland Trophy

- Mike McGee (1959)

Bobby Dodd Coach of the Year Award

- Fred Goldsmith (1994)
- David Cutcliffe (2013)

Walter Camp Coach of the Year Award

- David Cutcliffe (2013)

Southern Conference Coach of the Year

- Wallace Wade (1949)
- Bill Murray (1952)

ACC Coach of the Year

- Bill Murray (1954, 1960 and 1962)
- Steve Spurrier (1988 and 1989)
- Fred Goldsmith (1994)
- David Cutcliffe (2012 and 2013)
- Mike Elko (2022)

ACC Player of the Year

- Robert Baldwin, HB (1994)
- Clarkston Hines, WR (1989)
- Anthony Dilweg, QB (1988)
- Ben Bennett, QB (1983)
- Chris Castor, WR (1982)
- Steve Jones, HB (1972)
- Ernie Jackson, DB (1971)
- Jay Wilkinson, HB (1963)
- Mike McGee, G (1959)
- Jerry Barger, HB (1954)

ACC Rookie of the Year

- Ben Bennett, QB (1980)

College Football Hall of Fame

- Howard Jones, Coach (1951)
- Wallace Wade, Coach (1955)
- Ace Parker, HB (1955)
- George McAfee, HB (1961)
- Dan Hill, C (1962)
- Eric Tipton, HB (1965)
- Fred Crawford, T (1973)
- Bill Murray, Coach (1974)
- Steve Lach, HB (1980)
- Al DeRogatis, DT (1986)
- Mike McGee, G (1990)
- Clarkston Hines, WR (2011)
- Steve Spurrier, Coach (2017)

Pro Football Hall of Fame

- George McAfee, HB (1966)
- Ace Parker, HB (1972)
- Sonny Jurgensen, QB (1983)

Consensus All-Americans

- Fred Crawford, T (1933)
- Ace Parker, HB (1936)
- Ernie Jackson, DB (1971)
- Clarkston Hines, WR (1989)
- Jeremy Cash, DB (2015)

== Future opponents ==
Year	Non-conference opponents				ACC opponents								
2026	Tulane (9/5)	at Illinois (9/12)	William & Mary (9/26)		Boston College	Clemson	North Carolina	Stanford	at Georgia Tech	at Miami	at NC State	at Virginia	at Wake Forest
2027	at Rice (8/28)	UConn (9/11)	Notre Dame		Boston College	Louisville	Miami	NC State	Wake Forest	at Florida State	at North Carolina	at Pittsburgh	at Stanford
2028	TCU (9/9)	at Temple (9/16)	at UConn (10/14)		Georgia Tech	North Carolina	Syracuse	Virginia	at Boston College	at Miami	at NC State	at Wake Forest	
2029	at TCU (9/8)	Middle Tennessee (9/15)	at UConn (9/29)		NC State	Pittsburgh	Stanford	Wake Forest	at California	at Louisville	at North Carolina	at Virginia Tech	
2030	UConn (8/31)	Rice (9/7)	at Notre Dame		California	Florida State	Louisville	North Carolina	at Clemson	at NC State	at SMU	at Wake Forest	
2031	TBD	TBD	TBD										
2032	TBD	TBD	TBD										
2033	Notre Dame (9/24)												
2034	TBD	TBD	TBD	TBD									
2035	at Notre Dame	TBD	TBD	TBD									
2036	TBD	TBD	TBD	TBD									
2037	TBD	TBD	TBD	TBD									
