= 1960 Clemson Tigers football team =

American college football season

1960 Clemson Tigers football
- Conference: Atlantic Coast Conference
- Record: 6–4 (4–2 ACC)
- Head coach: Frank Howard (21st season)
- Captains: Dave Lynn; Lowndes Shingler
- Home stadium: Memorial Stadium

1960 Atlantic Coast Conference football standings
	Conf.					Overall
Team	W		L		T	W		L		T
No. 10 Duke $	5	–	1	–	0	8	–	3	–	0
NC State	4	–	1	–	1	6	–	3	–	1
Maryland	5	–	2	–	0	6	–	4	–	0
Clemson	4	–	2	–	0	6	–	4	–	0
South Carolina	3	–	3	–	1	3	–	6	–	1
North Carolina	2	–	5	–	0	3	–	7	–	0
Wake Forest	2	–	5	–	0	2	–	8	–	0
Virginia	0	–	6	–	0	0	–	10	–	0
$ – Conference champion; Rankings from AP poll

The 1960 Clemson Tigers football team was an American football team that represented Clemson University in the Atlantic Coast Conference (ACC) during the 1960 college football season. In its 21st season under head coach Frank Howard, the team compiled a 6–4 record (4–2 against conference opponents), finished fourth in the ACC, and outscored opponents by a total of 197 to 124. The team played its home games at Memorial Stadium in Clemson, South Carolina.

Dave Lynn and Lowndes Shingler were the team captains. The team's statistical leaders included Lowndes Shingler with 790 passing yards, Bill McGuirt with 320 rushing yards and 54 points scored (9 touchdowns), and Harry Pavilack with 272 receiving yards.

== Schedule ==
Date	Time	Opponent	Rank	Site	Result	Attendance	Source
September 24	2:00 p.m.	at Wake Forest	No. 9	Bowman Gray Stadium; Winston-Salem, NC	W 28–7	22,000	
October 1	2:00 p.m.	Virginia Tech*	No. 7	Memorial Stadium; Clemson, SC	W 13–7	26,000	
October 8	2:00 p.m.	Virginia	No. 8	Memorial Stadium; Clemson, SC	W 21–7	14,000	
October 15	2:00 p.m.	at Maryland	No. 8	Byrd Stadium; College Park, MD	L 17–19	18,000	
October 22	2:00 p.m.	at Duke		Duke Stadium; Durham, NC	L 6–21	33,000	
October 29	3:00 p.m.	at Vanderbilt*		Dudley Field; Nashville, TN	L 20–22	18,000	
November 5	2:00 p.m.	North Carolina^{†}		Memorial Stadium; Clemson, SC	W 24–0	35,000	
November 12	2:00 p.m.	South Carolina		Memorial Stadium; Clemson, SC (rivalry)	W 12–2	45,000	
November 19	1:30 p.m.	at Boston College*		Alumni Stadium; Chestnut Hill, MA (rivalry)	L 14–25	15,700	
November 26	2:00 p.m.	Furman*		Memorial Stadium; Clemson, SC	W 42–14	23,000	
*Non-conference game; ^{†}Homecoming; Rankings from AP Poll released prior to the game; All times are in Eastern time
