= 1960 Wake Forest Demon Deacons football team =

American college football season

1960 Wake Forest Demon Deacons football
- Conference: Atlantic Coast Conference
- Record: 2–8 (2–5 ACC)
- Head coach: Bill Hildebrand (1st season)
- Captains: Norm Snead; Wayne Wolf
- Home stadium: Bowman Gray Stadium

1960 Atlantic Coast Conference football standings
	Conf.					Overall
Team	W		L		T	W		L		T
No. 10 Duke $	5	–	1	–	0	8	–	3	–	0
NC State	4	–	1	–	1	6	–	3	–	1
Maryland	5	–	2	–	0	6	–	4	–	0
Clemson	4	–	2	–	0	6	–	4	–	0
South Carolina	3	–	3	–	1	3	–	6	–	1
North Carolina	2	–	5	–	0	3	–	7	–	0
Wake Forest	2	–	5	–	0	2	–	8	–	0
Virginia	0	–	6	–	0	0	–	10	–	0
$ – Conference champion; Rankings from AP poll

The 1960 Wake Forest Demon Deacons football team was an American football team that represented Wake Forest University during the 1960 college football season. In its first season under head coach Bill Hildebrand, the team compiled a 2–8 record and finished in seventh place in the Atlantic Coast Conference (ACC).

Quarterback Norm Snead was selected by the United Press International as a first-team player on the 1960 All-Atlantic Coast Conference football team. Snead later played 16 seasons in the NFL and was a four-time All-Pro selection.

== Schedule ==
Date	Opponent	Site	Result	Attendance	Source
September 24	No. 9 Clemson	Bowman Gray Stadium; Winston-Salem, NC	L 7–28	22,000	
October 1	at Florida State*	Doak Campbell Stadium; Tallahassee, FL	L 6–14	19,100	
October 8	at Virginia Tech*	Miles Stadium; Blacksburg, VA	L 13–22	11,000	
October 15	at North Carolina	Kenan Memorial Stadium; Chapel Hill, NC (rivalry)	W 13–12	36,000	
October 22	Maryland	Bowman Gray Stadium; Winston-Salem, NC	L 13–14	11,000	
October 29	at Virginia	Scott Stadium; Charlottesville, VA	W 28–20	12,000	
November 5	NC State	Bowman Gray Stadium; Winston-Salem, NC (rivalry)	L 12–14	14,500	
November 12	No. 7 Duke	Bowman Gray Stadium; Winston-Salem, NC (rivalry)	L 7–34	16,500	
November 19	at LSU*	Tiger Stadium; Baton Rouge, LA	L 0–16	49,909	
November 26	at South Carolina	Carolina Stadium; Columbia, SC	L 20–41	15,000	
*Non-conference game; Rankings from AP Poll released prior to the game

== Team leaders ==
Category	Team Leader	Att/Cth	Yds
Passing	Norm Snead	123/259	1,676
Rushing	Bobby Robinson	57	232
Receiving	Bobby Allen	23	391
