= 1960 NC State Wolfpack football team =

American college football season

1960 NC State Wolfpack football
- Conference: Atlantic Coast Conference
- Record: 6–3–1 (4–1–1 ACC)
- Head coach: Earle Edwards (7th season)
- Home stadium: Riddick Stadium

1960 Atlantic Coast Conference football standings
	Conf.					Overall
Team	W		L		T	W		L		T
No. 10 Duke $	5	–	1	–	0	8	–	3	–	0
NC State	4	–	1	–	1	6	–	3	–	1
Maryland	5	–	2	–	0	6	–	4	–	0
Clemson	4	–	2	–	0	6	–	4	–	0
South Carolina	3	–	3	–	1	3	–	6	–	1
North Carolina	2	–	5	–	0	3	–	7	–	0
Wake Forest	2	–	5	–	0	2	–	8	–	0
Virginia	0	–	6	–	0	0	–	10	–	0
$ – Conference champion; Rankings from AP poll

The 1960 NC State Wolfpack football team represented North Carolina State University during the 1960 college football season. The Wolfpack were led by seventh-year head coach Earle Edwards and played their home games at Riddick Stadium in Raleigh, North Carolina. They competed as members of the Atlantic Coast Conference, finishing in second.

== Schedule ==
Date	Opponent	Site	Result	Attendance	Source
September 17	Virginia Tech*	Riddick Stadium; Raleigh, NC	W 29–14		
September 24	at North Carolina	Kenan Memorial Stadium; Chapel Hill, NC (rivalry)	W 3–0	41,000	
October 1	Virginia	Riddick Stadium; Raleigh, NC	W 26–7	14,500	
October 8	Maryland	Riddick Stadium; Raleigh, NC	W 13–10	14,000	
October 15	at Duke	Duke Stadium; Durham, NC (rivalry)	L 13–17	28,000	
October 22	at Mississippi Southern*	Faulkner Field; Hattiesburg, MS	W 20–13	16,100	
October 29	at UCLA*	Los Angeles Memorial Coliseum; Los Angeles, CA	L 0–7	27,637	
November 5	at Wake Forest	Bowman Gray Stadium; Winston-Salem, NC (rivalry)	W 14–12	14,500	
November 12	at Arizona State*	Sun Devil Stadium; Tempe, AZ	L 22–25	27,400	
November 19	at South Carolina	Carolina Stadium; Columbia, SC	T 8–8	23,000	
*Non-conference game
