= 1989 All-American Bowl =

Duke Blue Devils	Texas Tech Red Raiders
(8–3)	(8–3)
21	49
Head coach: Steve Spurrier	Head coach: Spike Dykes
AP / Coaches; 20 / NR	AP / Coaches; 24 / 19
	1	2	3	4	Total
Duke	0	14	0	7	21
Texas Tech	14	14	14	7	49
- Date: December 28, 1989
- Season: 1989
- Stadium: Legion Field
- Location: Birmingham, Alabama
- MVP: RB James Gray
- Referee: Dick Burleson (SEC)
- Attendance: 47,750

United States TV coverage
- Network: ESPN
- Announcers: Wayne Larrivee, Ben Bennett and Chris Fowler

The 1989 All-American Bowl was a college football postseason bowl game between the Duke Blue Devils and Texas Tech Red Raiders.

== Background ==
Both teams had bowl win droughts of over 15 years, with Duke not having a bowl game in 28 years and Texas Tech not winning one in 16 years. Duke was (co) champion of the Atlantic Coast Conference with Virginia (the only team to beat Duke in ACC play that year) for the first time since 1962, which was also the last time they had gone to a bowl game. As for Texas Tech, they were 4th place in the Southwest Conference, in their first bowl game since 1986.

== Game summary ==
=== First quarter ===
- Texas Tech – James Gray 2 yard touchdown run (Elliott kick failed)
- Texas Tech – Price 36 yard touchdown pass from Gill (Talkington pass from Gill)

=== Second quarter ===
- Texas Tech – Gray 54 yard touchdown run (Elliott kick)
- Texas Tech – Gray 18 yard touchdown run (Elliott kick)
- Duke – Bud Zuberer 30 yard touchdown pass from Brown (Gardner kick)
- Duke – Dave Colonna 25 yard touchdown pass from Brown (Gardner kick)

=== Third quarter ===
- Texas Tech – Anthony Lynn 1 yard touchdown run (Elliott kick)
- Texas Tech – Gill 1 yard touchdown run (Elliott kick)

=== Fourth quarter ===
- Duke – Colonna 16 yard touchdown pass from Brown (Gardner kick)
- Texas Tech – Gray 32 yard touchdown run (Elliott kick)

James Gray ran for 280 yards on 33 carries.| source =

== Aftermath ==
Spurrier left for his alma mater of Florida after the game. The Blue Devils did not reach a bowl game again until 1995. Texas Tech was not invited to a bowl again until 1993.

== Statistics ==
Statistics	Texas Tech	Duke
First downs	22	19
Rushing yards	349	67
Passing (C–A–I)	6–14–0	25–42–2
Passing yards	174	349
Total yards	523	416
Fumbles–lost	0–0	3–2
Penalties–yards	6–40	4–40
Punts–average	5–37.6	5–36.4
