= 1960 Maryland Terrapins football team =

American college football season

1960 Maryland Terrapins football
- Conference: Atlantic Coast Conference
- Record: 6–4 (5–2 ACC)
- Head coach: Tom Nugent (2nd season)
- Home stadium: Byrd Stadium

1960 Atlantic Coast Conference football standings
	Conf.					Overall
Team	W		L		T	W		L		T
No. 10 Duke $	5	–	1	–	0	8	–	3	–	0
NC State	4	–	1	–	1	6	–	3	–	1
Maryland	5	–	2	–	0	6	–	4	–	0
Clemson	4	–	2	–	0	6	–	4	–	0
South Carolina	3	–	3	–	1	3	–	6	–	1
North Carolina	2	–	5	–	0	3	–	7	–	0
Wake Forest	2	–	5	–	0	2	–	8	–	0
Virginia	0	–	6	–	0	0	–	10	–	0
$ – Conference champion; Rankings from AP poll

The 1960 Maryland Terrapins football team represented the University of Maryland in the 1960 college football season. In their second season under head coach Tom Nugent, the Terrapins compiled a 6–4 record (5–2 in conference), finished in third place in the Atlantic Coast Conference, and outscored their opponents 171 to 164. The team's statistical leaders included Dale Betty with 796 passing yards, Pat Drass with 297 rushing yards, and Gary Collins with 404 receiving yards.

== Schedule ==
Date	Opponent	Site	Result	Attendance	Source
September 17	at West Virginia*	Mountaineer Field; Morgantown, WV (rivalry)	W 31–8	18,000	
September 24	No. 15 Texas*	Byrd Stadium; College Park, MD	L 0–34	31,000	
October 1	Duke	Byrd Stadium; College Park, MD	L 7–20	25,000	
October 8	at NC State	Riddick Stadium; Raleigh, NC	L 10–13	14,000	
October 15	No. 8 Clemson	Byrd Stadium; College Park, MD	W 19–17	18,000	
October 22	at Wake Forest	Bowman Gray Stadium; Winston-Salem, NC	W 14–13	11,000	
October 29	South Carolina	Byrd Stadium; College Park, MD	W 15–0	21,000	
November 5	at Penn State*	Beaver Stadium; University Park, PA (rivalry)	L 9–28	30,126	
November 12	at North Carolina	Kenan Memorial Stadium; Chapel Hill, NC	W 22–19	26,000	
November 19	at Virginia	Scott Stadium; Charlottesville, VA (rivalry)	W 44–12	14,500	
*Non-conference game; Rankings from AP Poll released prior to the game
