= 1960 South Carolina Gamecocks football team =

American college football season

1960 South Carolina Gamecocks football
- Conference: Atlantic Coast Conference
- Record: 3–6–1 (3–3–1 ACC)
- Head coach: Warren Giese (5th season)
- Captains: Jerry Frye; Jake Bodkin
- Home stadium: Carolina Stadium

1960 Atlantic Coast Conference football standings
	Conf.					Overall
Team	W		L		T	W		L		T
No. 10 Duke $	5	–	1	–	0	8	–	3	–	0
NC State	4	–	1	–	1	6	–	3	–	1
Maryland	5	–	2	–	0	6	–	4	–	0
Clemson	4	–	2	–	0	6	–	4	–	0
South Carolina	3	–	3	–	1	3	–	6	–	1
North Carolina	2	–	5	–	0	3	–	7	–	0
Wake Forest	2	–	5	–	0	2	–	8	–	0
Virginia	0	–	6	–	0	0	–	10	–	0
$ – Conference champion; Rankings from AP poll

The 1960 South Carolina Gamecocks football team represented the University of South Carolina as a member of the Atlantic Coast Conference (ACC) during the 1960 college football season. Led by Warren Giese in his fifth and final season as head coach, the Gamecocks compiled an overall record of 3–6–1 with a mark of 3–3–1 in conference play, placing fifth in the ACC. The team played home games at Carolina Stadium in Columbia, South Carolina.

== Schedule ==
Date	Opponent	Site	Result	Attendance	Source
September 24	Duke	Carolina Stadium; Columbia, SC	L 0–31	37,000	
October 1	at Georgia*	Sanford Stadium; Athens, GA (rivalry)	L 6–38	33,000	
October 14	at Miami (FL)*	Miami Orange Bowl; Miami, FL	L 6–21	28,754	
October 22	North Carolina	Carolina Stadium; Columbia, SC (rivalry)	W 22–6	20,000	
October 29	at Maryland	Byrd Stadium; College Park, MD	L 0–15	21,000	
November 5	at LSU*	Tiger Stadium; Baton Rouge, LA	L 6–35	52,650	
November 12	at Clemson	Memorial Stadium; Clemson, SC (rivalry)	L 2–12	45,000	
November 19	NC State	Carolina Stadium; Columbia, SC	T 8–8	23,000	
November 26	Wake Forest	Carolina Stadium; Columbia, SC	W 41–20	15,000	
December 3	Virginia	Carolina Stadium; Columbia, SC	W 26–0	14,000	
*Non-conference game
