= 1960 North Carolina Tar Heels football team =

American college football season

1960 North Carolina Tar Heels football
- Conference: Atlantic Coast Conference
- Record: 3–7 (2–5 ACC)
- Head coach: Jim Hickey (2nd season)
- Captains: Rip Hawkins; Frank Riggs
- Home stadium: Kenan Memorial Stadium

1960 Atlantic Coast Conference football standings
	Conf.					Overall
Team	W		L		T	W		L		T
No. 10 Duke $	5	–	1	–	0	8	–	3	–	0
NC State	4	–	1	–	1	6	–	3	–	1
Maryland	5	–	2	–	0	6	–	4	–	0
Clemson	4	–	2	–	0	6	–	4	–	0
South Carolina	3	–	3	–	1	3	–	6	–	1
North Carolina	2	–	5	–	0	3	–	7	–	0
Wake Forest	2	–	5	–	0	2	–	8	–	0
Virginia	0	–	6	–	0	0	–	10	–	0
$ – Conference champion; Rankings from AP poll

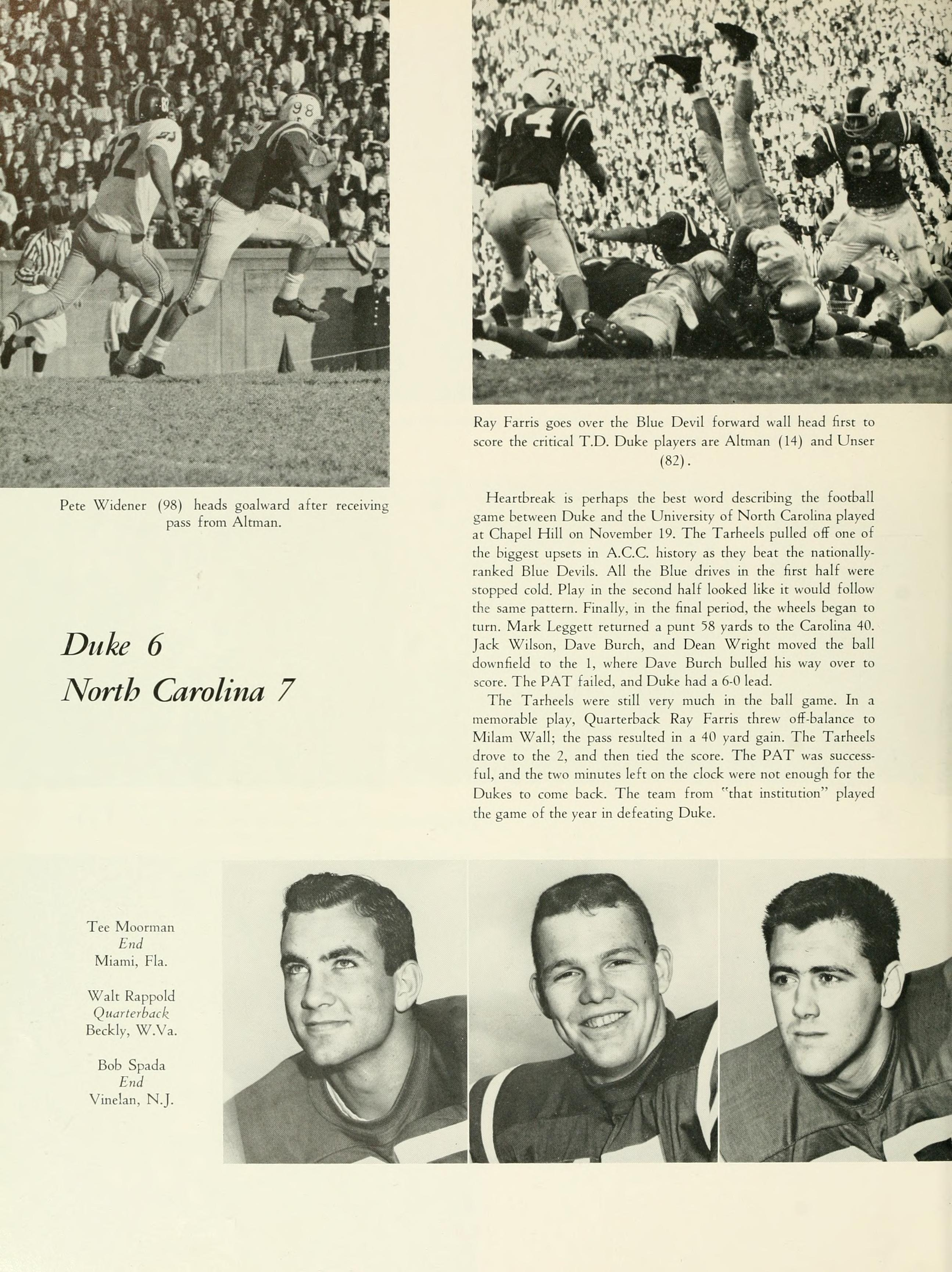
A page scan from the 1961 edition of the Chanticleer, the Duke University yearbook

The 1960 North Carolina Tar Heels football team represented the University of North Carolina at Chapel Hill during the 1960 college football season. The Tar Heels were led by second-year head coach Jim Hickey and played their home games at Kenan Memorial Stadium. The team competed as a member of the Atlantic Coast Conference, finishing tied for sixth.

== Schedule ==
Date	Time	Opponent	Site	Result	Attendance	Source
September 24	2:00 p.m.	NC State	Kenan Memorial Stadium; Chapel Hill, NC (rivalry)	L 0–3	41,000	
September 30	8:15 p.m.	at Miami (FL)*	Miami Orange Bowl; Miami, FL	L 12–29	40,252	
October 8	2:00 p.m.	Notre Dame*	Kenan Memorial Stadium; Chapel Hill, NC (rivalry)	W 12–7	41,000	
October 15	2:00 p.m.	Wake Forest	Kenan Memorial Stadium; Chapel Hill, NC (rivalry)	L 12–13	36,000	
October 22	2:00 p.m.	at South Carolina	Carolina Stadium; Columbia, SC (rivalry)	L 6–22	20,000	
October 29	2:00 p.m.	at No. 11 Tennessee*	Shields–Watkins Field; Knoxville, TN	L 14–27	27,060	
November 5	2:00 p.m.	at Clemson	Memorial Stadium; Clemson, SC	L 0–24	35,000	
November 12	2:00 p.m.	Maryland	Kenan Memorial Stadium; Chapel Hill, NC	L 19–22	26,000	
November 19	2:00 p.m.	No. 6 Duke	Kenan Memorial Stadium; Chapel Hill, NC (Victory Bell)	W 7–6	42,000	
November 26	1:30 p.m.	at Virginia	Scott Stadium; Charlottesville, VA (South's Oldest Rivalry)	W 35–8	8,000	
*Non-conference game; Rankings from AP Poll released prior to the game; All times are in Eastern time
