= E. L. Alexander =

American football coach

Playing career
- 1909–1910: Lafayette
- 1911–1912: Washington & Jefferson

Coaching career (HC unless noted)
- 1923: Trinity (NC)

Head coaching record
- Overall: 5–4

S. M. or E. L. Alexander was an American football coach. He succeeded Herman G. Steiner as the head football coach Trinity College—now known as Duke University—in midseason in 1923, where the team had a record of 5–4.

Alexander attended The Kiski School in Saltsburg, Pennsylvania from 1906 to 1909 and spent two years at Lafayette College under coach Bob Folwell. In 1911, he followed Folwell to Washington & Jefferson College, where he played another two years. In 1916, he coached an Army team in El Paso, Texas, and the following year, after the U.S. entered World War I, he coached an Army team in Augusta, Georgia. In 1922, he was in charge of the freshman athletics at Trinity College.

== Head coaching record ==
Year	Team	Overall	Conference	Standing	Bowl/playoffs
Trinity Blue Devils (Independent) (1923)
1923	Trinity	5–4			
Trinity:		5–4			
Total:		5–4			
