= Floyd J. Egan =

American football and basketball coach (1896–1967)

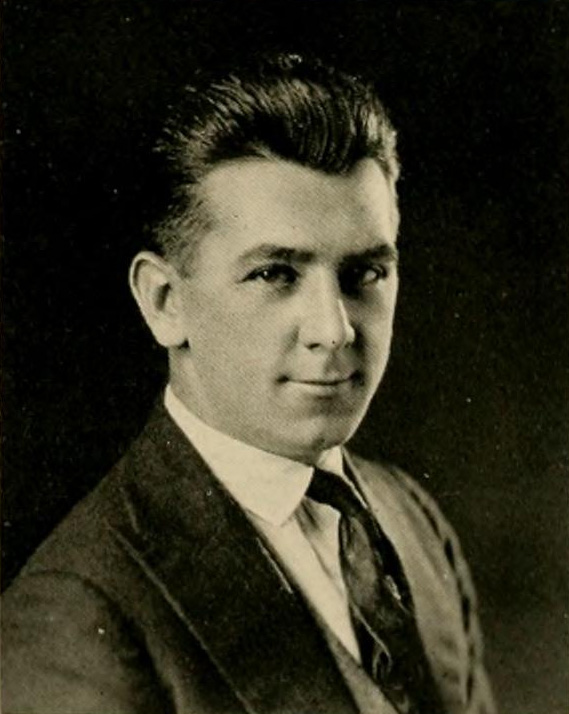

Biographical details
- Born: April 6, 1896; Brooklyn, New York, U.S.
- Died: 1967 (aged 70–71)
- Education: New York University (1918)

Coaching career (HC unless noted)

Football
- 1920: Trinity (NC)

Basketball
- 1918–1919: NYU
- 1920–1921: Trinity (NC)

Head coaching record
- Overall: 4–0–1 (football); 14–12 (basketball)

Floyd Joseph Egan (April 6, 1896 – 1967) was an American football and basketball coach. He served as the head football coach of Trinity College—now known as Duke University—in 1920, compiling a record of 4–0–1. Egan was also the head basketball coach at New York University (NYU) for one season, in 1918–19, and at Trinity for the 1920–21 season, tallying a career college basketball record of 14–12.

While at NYU, Egan competed in football, baseball, basketball, and track and field.

== Head coaching record ==
=== Football ===
Year	Team	Overall	Conference	Standing	Bowl/playoffs
Trinity Blue and White (Independent) (1920)
1920	Trinity	4–0–1			
Trinity:		4–0–1			
Total:		4–0–1			

=== Basketball ===
Record table
Season	Team	Overall	Conference	Standing	Postseason
NYU Violets (Independent) (1918–1919)
1918–19	NYU	5–6			
NYU:		5–6			
Trinity Blue and White (Independent) (1920–1921)
1920–21	Trinity	9–6			
Trinity:		9–6			
Total:		14–12			
