= Bill Murray (American football coach) =

American football coach (1908-1986)

William D. Murray
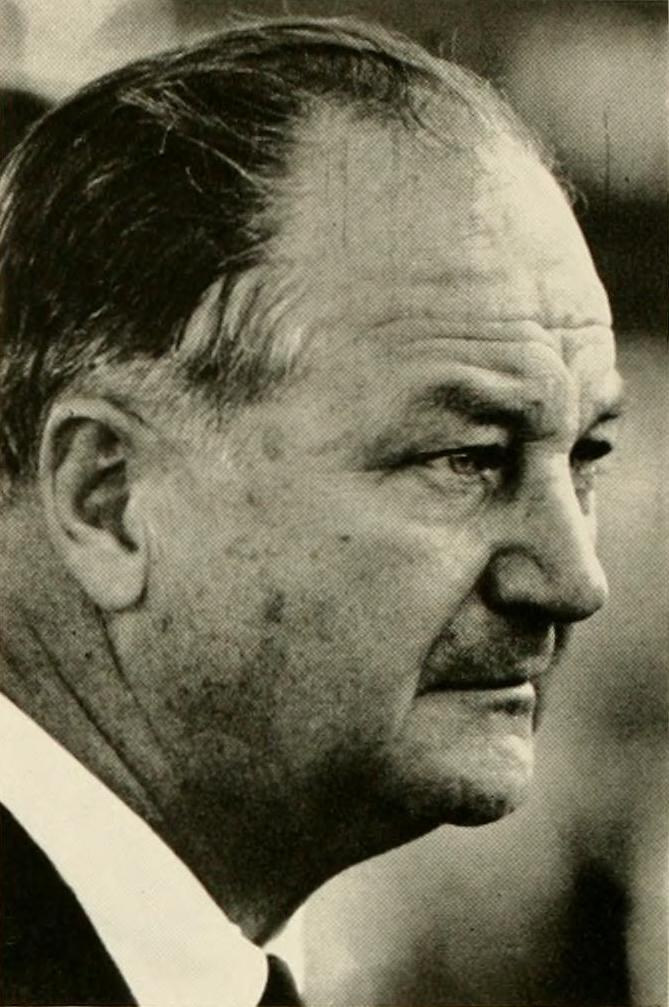
- Murray c. 1964

Biographical details
- Born: September 9, 1908; Rocky Mount, North Carolina, U.S.
- Died: March 29, 1986 (aged 77); Durham, North Carolina, U.S.

Playing career
- 1928–1930: Duke
- Position: Halfback

Coaching career (HC unless noted)

Football
- 1940–1942: Delaware
- 1946–1950: Delaware
- 1951–1965: Duke

Basketball
- 1944–1945: Delaware

Administrative career (AD unless noted)
- 1940–1951: Delaware

Head coaching record
- Overall: 142–67–11 (football); 3–9 (basketball)
- Bowls: 3–1

Accomplishments and honors

Championships
- Football; 1 AP small college national (1946); 1 Mason-Dixon Conference (1946); 1 SoCon (1952); 6 ACC (1953–1955, 1960–1962)

Awards
- Football; Amos Alonzo Stagg Award (1971); 3× ACC Coach of the Year (1954, 1960, 1962)
- College Football Hall of Fame; Inducted in 1974 (profile)

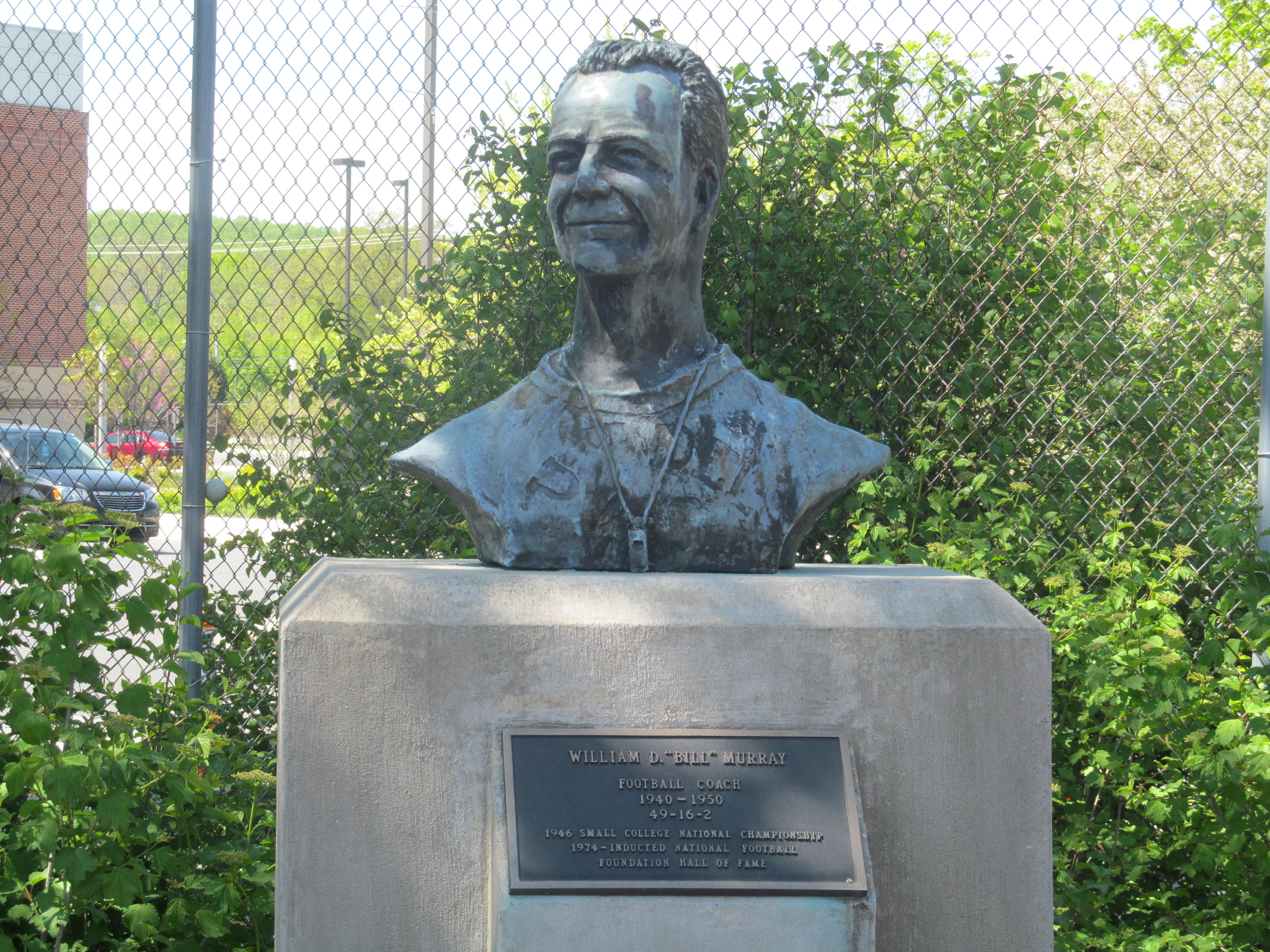
A bust of William D. Murray located at Delaware Stadium commemorating his record as head coach, National Championship, and College Football Hall of Fame induction.

William D. Murray (September 9, 1908 – March 29, 1986) was an American football and basketball coach and college athletics administrator. He served as the head football coach at University of Delaware from 1940 to 1942 and from 1946 to 1950 and at Duke University from 1951 to 1965, compiling a career college football record of 142–67–11. During his tenure at Delaware, Murray tallied a 49–16–2 mark including three undefeated seasons from 1941, 1942, and 1946; there was no formal team from 1943 to 1945 due to World War II. Murray's career record at Duke was 93–51–9, giving him second most wins in program history behind Wallace Wade. Murray was also the head basketball coach at Delaware for one season in 1944–45.

In 1965, Murray retired as Duke's head football coach and was named executive secretary of the American Football Coaches Association (AFCA), where he served for 17 years. He was inducted into the College Football Hall of Fame as a coach in 1974. In 1983, Murray was inducted into the Delaware Sports Hall of Fame. Murray died on March 29, 1986, in Durham, North Carolina.

== Head coaching record ==
=== Football ===
Year	Team	Overall	Conference	Standing	Bowl/playoffs	Coaches^{#}	AP^{°}
Delaware Fightin' Blue Hens (Independent) (1940–1942)
1940	Delaware	5–3					
1941	Delaware	7–0–1					
1942	Delaware	8–0					
Delaware Fightin' Blue Hens (Mason-Dixon Conference) (1946)
1946	Delaware	10–0	3–0	1st	W Cigar		19
Delaware Fightin' Blue Hens (Independent) (1947–1950)
1947	Delaware	4–4					
1948	Delaware	5–3					
1949	Delaware	8–1					
1950	Delaware	2–5–1					
Delaware:		49–16–2	3–0				
Duke Blue Devils (Southern Conference) (1951–1952)
1951	Duke	5–4–1	4–2	6th			
1952	Duke	8–2	5–0	1st		18	16
Duke Blue Devils (Atlantic Coast Conference) (1953–1965)
1953	Duke	7–2–1	4–0	T–1st		18	18
1954	Duke	8–2–1	4–0	1st	W Orange	14	14
1955	Duke	7–2–1	4–0	T–1st		16	
1956	Duke	5–4–1	4–1	2nd		20	
1957	Duke	6–3–2	5–1–1	2nd	L Orange	14	16
1958	Duke	5–5	3–2	3rd			
1959	Duke	4–6	2–3	6th			
1960	Duke	8–3	5–1	1st	W Cotton	11	10
1961	Duke	7–3	5–1	1st		14	20
1962	Duke	8–2	6–0	1st		14	
1963	Duke	5–4–1	5–2	T–3rd			
1964	Duke	4–5–1	3–2–1	2nd			
1965	Duke	6–4	4–2	3rd			
Duke:		93–51–9	63–17–2				
Total:		142–67–11					
National championship Conference title Conference division title or championship game berth
^{#}Rankings from final Coaches Poll.; ^{°}Rankings from final AP Poll.
