= Fred Goldsmith (American football) =

American football player and coach (born 1944)

Biographical details
- Born: March 3, 1944 (age 82)

Playing career
- 1963–1964: Western Carolina

Coaching career (HC unless noted)
- 1974–1978: Florida A&M (DC/RC)
- 1979: Air Force (TE)
- 1980: Air Force (AHC/DC)
- 1981: Slippery Rock
- 1982–1983: Air Force (AHC/DC)
- 1984–1988: Arkansas (AHC/DC)
- 1989–1993: Rice
- 1994–1998: Duke
- 2001–2005: Franklin HS (NC)
- 2007–2010: Lenoir–Rhyne

Head coaching record
- Overall: 59–104–1 (college); 47–15 (high school)
- Bowls: 0–1

Accomplishments and honors

Awards
- Bobby Dodd Coach of the Year Award (1994); ACC Coach of the Year (1994)

Fred Goldsmith (born March 3, 1944) is an American former football coach. He served as the head football coach at Slippery Rock University of Pennsylvania (1981), Rice University (1989–1993), Duke University (1994–1998), and Lenoir–Rhyne University (2007–2010), compiling a career record of 59–104–1.

== Coaching career ==
Goldsmith is perhaps best known for his head coaching stints at two NCAA Division I football programs: Rice and Duke. He was recognized as the 1992 Sports Illustrated National NCAA Football Coach of the Year for leading Rice to within one win of a bowl game. The Owls finished 6-5 and tied for second in the Southwest Conference, their best showing in conference play in 28 years. However, a 61-32 rout at the hands of intercity rival Houston left them out of a bowl.

Primarily on the strength of turning the Rice program around, he was hired at Duke in 1994, where he won the Bobby Dodd Coach of the Year Award in his first season after leading the Blue Devils to their first winning season in six years, and only their eighth winning season in 30 years. However, this momentum did not last, and within two years the Blue Devils had crumbled to the second winless season in school history. Goldsmith was fired by Duke athletics director Joe Alleva just a year into Alleva's tenure after recording only nine wins during his last four seasons, including only three in Atlantic Coast Conference play.

In addition, under Goldsmith's tenure, Duke's football program was ordered to pay walk-on kicker, Heather Sue Mercer, $2,000,001 in nominal and punitive damages for its discriminatory treatment of her during her time on the team. A federal jury found that Mercer was afforded less of an opportunity to practice and compete than other 'similarly situated' players (other walk-on kickers). Her allegations also included sexist statements made to her by Goldsmith. (See Mercer v. Duke University, 190 F.3d 643 (4th Cir. 1999).

Goldsmith's final coaching job was as the 18th head football coach for Lenoir–Rhyne University, an NCAA Division II school in Hickory, North Carolina. Hired on November 28, 2006, Goldsmith arrived at Lenoir-Rhyne fresh off a successful four-year run at Franklin High School in Franklin, North Carolina, where he compiled an overall win–loss record of 47–15. Goldsmith retired on May 3, 2011.

== Head coaching record ==
=== College ===
Year	Team	Overall	Conference	Standing	Bowl/playoffs
Slippery Rock Rockets (Pennsylvania State Athletic Conference) (1981)
1981	Slippery Rock	2–7	2–4	T–5th (West)	
Slippery Rock:		2–7	2–4		
Rice Owls (Southwest Conference) (1989–1983)
1989	Rice	2–8–1	2–6	T–7th	
1990	Rice	5–6	3–5	T–5th	
1991	Rice	4–7	2–6	8th	
1992	Rice	6–5	4–3	T–2nd	
1993	Rice	6–5	3–4	T–4th	
Rice:		23–31–1	14–24		
Duke Blue Devils (Atlantic Coast Conference) (1994–1998)
1994	Duke	8–4	5–3	T–3rd	L Hall of Fame
1995	Duke	3–8	1–7	8th	
1996	Duke	0–11	0–8	9th	
1997	Duke	2–9	0–8	9th	
1998	Duke	4–7	2–6	6th	
Duke:		17–39	8–32		
Lenoir–Rhyne Bears (South Atlantic Conference) (2007–2010)
2007	Lenoir–Rhyne	2–9	0–6	7th	
2008	Lenoir–Rhyne	3–8	1–6	7th	
2009	Lenoir–Rhyne	5–6	2–5	T–6th	
2010	Lenoir–Rhyne	7–4	4–3	3rd	
Lenoir–Rhyne:		17–27	7–20		
Total:		59–104–1			
