= Jimmy DeHart =

American football player and coach (1893–1935)

James DeHart
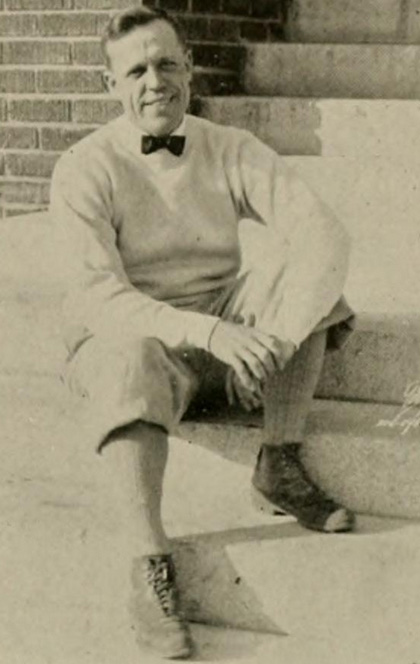
- DeHart circa 1927

Biographical details
- Born: August 25, 1893; Reynoldsville, Pennsylvania, U.S.
- Died: March 4, 1935 (aged 41); Winston-Salem, North Carolina, U.S.

Playing career

Football
- 1914–1916: Pittsburgh
- 1918: Pittsburgh

Basketball
- 1915–1917: Pittsburgh
- Position: Quarterback (football)

Coaching career (HC unless noted)

Football
- 1920–1921: Georgia (backfield)
- 1922–1925: Washington and Lee
- 1926–1930: Duke
- 1931–1932: Washington and Lee

Head coaching record
- Overall: 51–50–6

Accomplishments and honors

Championships
- 1 SoCon (1923)

James DeHart (August 25, 1893 – March 4, 1935) was an American football player and coach. He served as the head coach at Washington and Lee University from 1922 to 1925 and again from 1931 to 1932 and at Duke University from 1926 to 1930, compiling a career college football record of 51–50–6. In 1935, he signed a contract to become the head coach at Southwestern University—now known as Rhodes College—in Memphis, Tennessee, but fell ill and died while relocating. DeHart attended the University of Pittsburgh, where he played football for the Panthers from 1914 to 1916 and in 1918. Hailed as a "star", he played quarterback under head coach Pop Warner and led the 1916 team to an undefeated season. He also earned letters in basketball, baseball, and track at Pittsburgh. DeHart put his college education on hiatus to serve in the United States Army during World War I. As a lieutenant in the Aviation Section, he coached a service team at Mather Field. He returned to Pittsburgh after his time in the Army. After graduation, he coached the backfield at the University of Georgia from 1920 to 1921.

== Head coaching record ==
Year	Team	Overall	Conference	Standing	Bowl/playoffs
Washington and Lee Generals (Southern Conference) (1922–1925)
1922	Washington and Lee	5–3–1	1–2	T–11th	
1923	Washington and Lee	6–2–1	4–0–1	T–1st	
1924	Washington and Lee	6–3–1	4–1–1	5th	
1925	Washington and Lee	5–5	5–1	4th	
Duke Blue Devils (Independent) (1926–1927)
1926	Duke	3–6			
1927	Duke	4–5			
Duke Blue Devils (Southern Conference) (1928–1930)
1928	Duke	5–5	1–1	T–10th	
1929	Duke	4–6	2–1	T–7th	
1930	Duke	8–1–2	4–1–1	4th	
Duke:		24–23–2	7–3–1		
Washington and Lee Generals (Southern Conference) (1931–1932)
1931	Washington and Lee	4–5–1	2–3	14th	
1932	Washington and Lee	1–9	1–4	T–18th	
Washington and Lee:		27–27–4	17–11–2		
Total:		51–50–6			
National championship Conference title Conference division title or championship game berth

== See also ==
- List of college football head coaches with non-consecutive tenure
