= Shirley Wilson =

American football player and coach (1925–2021)

Red Wilson
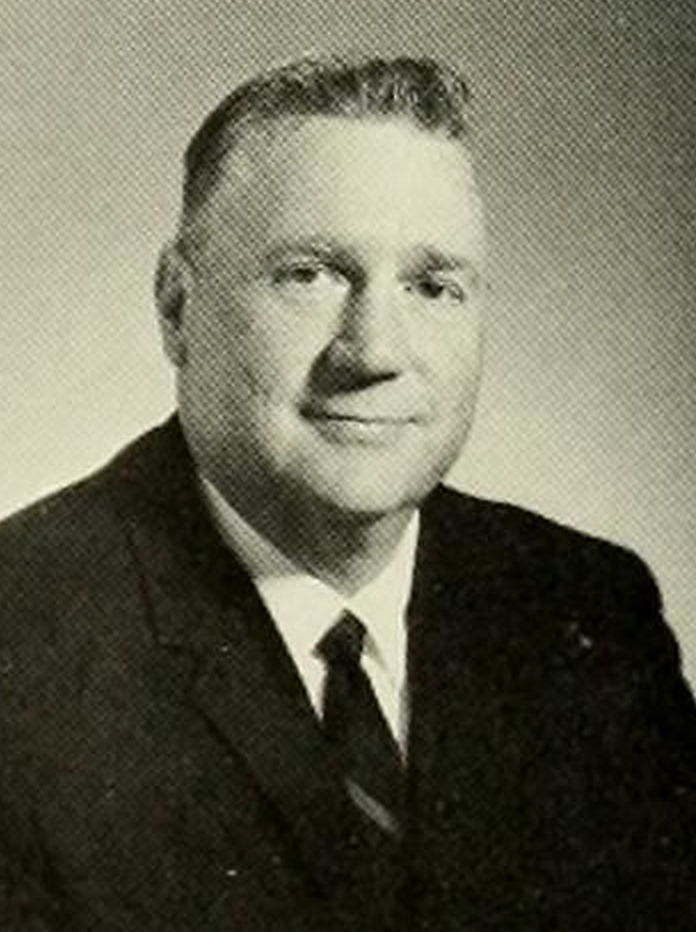
- Wilson pictured in Phi Psi Cli 1968, Elon yearbook

Biographical details
- Born: September 26, 1925; Madison, North Carolina, U.S.
- Died: January 8, 2021 (aged 95); Burlington, North Carolina, U.S.

Coaching career (HC unless noted)
- ?: South Norfolk HS (VA)
- ?–1956: Henderson HS (NC)
- 1957–1964: R. J. Reynolds HS (NC)
- 1965–1966: Fayetteville HS (NC)
- 1967–1976: Elon
- 1979–1982: Duke

Head coaching record
- Overall: 88–61–3 (college)
- Tournaments: 1–3 (NAIA D-I playoffs)

Accomplishments and honors

Championships
- 5 Carolinas Conference (1969, 1971–1974); 1 SAC (1976)

Shirley Schaub "Red" Wilson (September 26, 1925 – January 8, 2021) was an American football coach. He served as the head football coach at Elon University for 1967 to 1976 and at Duke University from 1979 to 1982, compiling a career college football head coaching record of 88–61–3.

Wilson was born in 1925 in Madison, North Carolina. He played football at Davidson College in Davidson, North Carolina. Prior to coaching at Elon, he coached football at Richard J. Reynolds High School in Winston-Salem, North Carolina. Wilson compiled a 71–35–2 (.667) record at Elon. His 71 wins are the most of any coach in the history of the Elon Phoenix football program. In three of his final four seasons at Elon, his teams won 10 or more games. At Duke, Wilson compiled a 16–27–1 record. He was a member of the North Carolina Sports Hall of Fame and the Winston-Salem/Forsyth County High School Sports Hall of Fame.

On January 8, 2021, he died at his home.

== Head coaching record ==
=== College ===
Year	Team	Overall	Conference	Standing	Bowl/playoffs
Elon Fightin' Christians (Carolinas Conference) (1967–1974)
1967	Elon	5–3–1	4–2–1	3rd	
1968	Elon	4–5	3–3	T–3rd	
1969	Elon	7–3	5–0	1st	
1970	Elon	3–7	2–3	T–3rd	
1971	Elon	8–3	5–0	1st	
1972	Elon	7–3–1	4–0–1	T–1st	
1973	Elon	12–1	4–0	1st	L NAIA Division I Championship
1974	Elon	10–2	4–0	1st	L NAIA Division I Semifinal
Elon Fightin' Christians (South Atlantic Conference) (1975–1976)
1975	Elon	5–6	3–3	T–4th	
1976	Elon	11–1	7–0	1st	L NAIA Division I Semifinal
Elon:		72–34–2	41–11–2		
Duke Blue Devils (Atlantic Coast Conference) (1979–1982)
1979	Duke	2–8–1	0–6	7th	
1980	Duke	2–9	1–5	7th	
1981	Duke	6–5	3–3	4th	
1982	Duke	6–5	3–3	T–3rd	
Duke:		16–27–1	7–17		
Total:		88–61–3			
National championship Conference title Conference division title or championship game berth
