= Herman G. Steiner =

American college football coach and athletic director

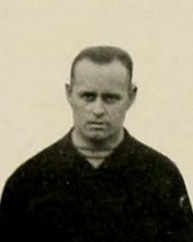

Biographical details
- Born: December 8, 1897; Massachusetts, U.S.
- Died: April 29, 1982 (aged 84); Oxford, Massachusetts, U.S.
- Education: Syracuse University (1916–17); Springfield College (1918–19); Normal College of Physical Education (1919–1921)

Coaching career (HC unless noted)

Football
- 1921: Trinity (NC) (assistant)
- 1922: Trinity (NC)
- 1923–1926: Trinity (NC) / Duke (assistant)

Baseball
- 1922: Trinity (NC)

Track and field
- 1921: Butler

Head coaching record
- Overall: 7–2–1 (football); 12–6 (baseball)

Herman G. Steiner (December 8, 1897 – April 29, 1982) was an American football, baseball, and track coach, athletic trainer, and college athletics administrator. He served as the head coach of the Duke Blue Devils football program during the 1922 college football season. Between 1921 and 1927, he was also the Assistant Director of Physical Education at Duke University and served stints as the school's head baseball coach, head track coach, trainer, and director of intramural athletics.

== Early years ==
Steiner was born in 1897 in Massachusetts. His father, Albert Steiner, was a German immigrant and a carpenter. By the time of the 1910 U.S. Census, Steiner was living with his parents in Brooklyn.

In September 1918, Steiner was living in Holyoke, Massachusetts. He studied for a year at Syracuse University where he was captain of the freshman football team. He then enrolled as a student at the International Young Men's Christian Association Training School (later known as Springfield College) in Springfield, Massachusetts from 1918 to 1919.

After serving in the United States Army during World War I, Steiner studied for two years at the Normal College of Physical Education in Indianapolis. He was captain of the basketball team and a member of the track team at the Normal College. While in Indianapolis, Steiner also coached the track teams of Butler College and the Athenaeum Athletic Club, a German-American athletic society in Indianapolis. He also played minor league baseball.

== Duke University ==
After completing his studies in Indianapolis in June 1921, Steiner was hired as the Assistant Director of Physical Training and track coach at Trinity College (now known as Duke University) in Durham, North Carolina. During the 1921–22 academic year, he was also the assistant football coach for Trinity. He stepped in as the acting coach for Trinity's 1921 game against Guilford College. The college yearbook noted: "Coach Baldwin was out of town, and Steiner handled the team. We don't know what he told them, but it must have been a 'mess', for when all the Guilford team had been assisted off the field, we read the score: Trinity 28-Guilford 0. It was then our biggest score! ... Needless to say, we were feeling good." Steiner also served as the head track coach and head baseball coach at Trinity during the 1921–22 academic year.

In February 1922, Steiner was selected as the head coach of the Trinity College football team for the 1922 season. During the 1922 football season, Steiner coached the Trinity football team to a 7–2–1 record as the team outscored its opponents 156 to 57.

Steiner served only one season as Trinity's head football coach, but he remained as the Assistant Director of Physical Education, assistant football coach, and trainer at Duke through at least the 1926–27 academic year. He was also responsible for overseeing intramural sports at the school.

== Family and later years ==
Steiner married Carolyn M. C. Tapscott at Indianapolis in 1922. At the time of the 1930 U.S. Census, he was living with his wife, Carolyn, and their son Francis in Holyoke. His occupation was listed in the census record as an "athletic coach" at a college. At the time of the 1940 U.S. Census, Steiner was living with his parents in Holyoke. His occupation was listed in the census record as a "recreation instructor" at a "W.P.A. Recreation Project." Steiner died in April 1982 at Oxford, Massachusetts.

== Head coaching record ==
=== Football ===
Year	Team	Overall	Conference	Standing	Bowl/playoffs
Trinity Blue and White (Independent) (1922)
1922	Trinity	7–2–1			
Trinity:		7–2–1			
Total:		7–2–1			

=== Baseball ===
Record table
Season	Team	Overall	Conference	Standing	Postseason
Trinity Blue and White (Independent) (1922)
1922	Trinity	12–6			
Total:		12–6			
