= 1960 Duke Blue Devils football team =

American college football season

1960 Duke Blue Devils football

ACC champion

Cotton Bowl, W 7–6 vs. Arkansas
- Conference: Atlantic Coast Conference

Ranking
- Coaches: No. 11
- AP: No. 10
- Record: 8–3 (5–1 ACC)
- Head coach: William D. Murray (10th season)
- MVP: Tee Moorman
- Captain: Art Browning
- Home stadium: Duke Stadium

1960 Atlantic Coast Conference football standings
	Conf.					Overall
Team	W		L		T	W		L		T
No. 10 Duke $	5	–	1	–	0	8	–	3	–	0
NC State	4	–	1	–	1	6	–	3	–	1
Maryland	5	–	2	–	0	6	–	4	–	0
Clemson	4	–	2	–	0	6	–	4	–	0
South Carolina	3	–	3	–	1	3	–	6	–	1
North Carolina	2	–	5	–	0	3	–	7	–	0
Wake Forest	2	–	5	–	0	2	–	8	–	0
Virginia	0	–	6	–	0	0	–	10	–	0
$ – Conference champion; Rankings from AP poll

The 1960 Duke Blue Devils football team represented Duke University during the 1960 college football season. Led by eighth-year head coach William D. Murray, the Blue Devils were Atlantic Coast Conference champions, and won the Cotton Bowl by a point over favored Arkansas.

It was Duke's sixth and most recent major bowl appearance, and its only trip to the Cotton Bowl. The program's next bowl was nearly three decades away, in 1989, and the next bowl win came in 2015.

== Schedule ==
Date	Opponent	Rank	Site	Result	Attendance	Source
September 24	at South Carolina		Carolina Stadium; Columbia, SC	W 31–0	37,000	
October 1	at Maryland		Byrd Stadium; College Park, MD	W 20–7	25,000	
October 8	at Michigan*		Michigan Stadium; Ann Arbor, MI	L 6–31	77,183	
October 15	NC State		Duke Stadium; Durham, NC (rivalry)	W 17–13	28,000	
October 22	Clemson		Duke Stadium; Durham, NC	W 21–6	33,000	
October 29	Georgia Tech*^{†}	No. 15	Duke Stadium; Durham, NC	W 6–0	40,000	
November 5	No. 4 Navy*	No. 13	Duke Stadium; Durham, NC	W 19–10	46,000	
November 12	at Wake Forest	No. 7	Bowman Gray Stadium; Winston-Salem, NC (rivalry)	W 34–7	16,500	
November 19	at North Carolina	No. 6	Kenan Stadium; Chapel Hill, NC (Victory Bell)	L 6–7	42,000	
December 3	at UCLA*	No. 11	Los Angeles Memorial Coliseum; Los Angeles, CA	L 6–27	23,357	
January 2, 1961	vs. No. 6 Arkansas	No. 10	Cotton Bowl; Dallas, TX (Cotton Bowl)	W 7–6	74,000	
*Non-conference game; ^{†}Homecoming; Rankings from AP Poll released prior to the game
