= 1961 Cotton Bowl Classic =

- 25th Cotton Bowl Classic
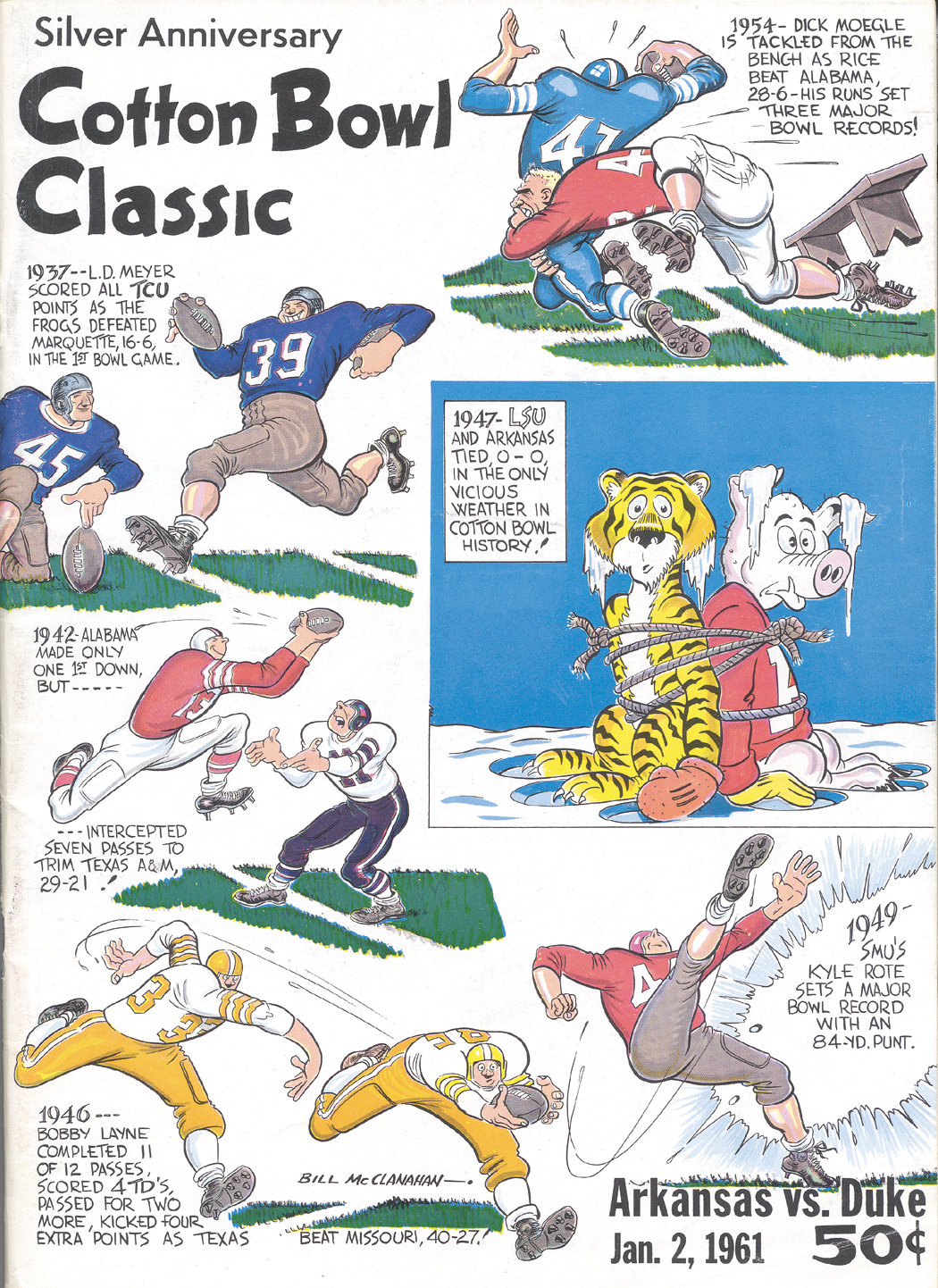
Duke Blue Devils	Arkansas Razorbacks
(7–3)	(8–2)
ACC	SWC
7	6
Head coach: William D. Murray	Head coach: Frank Broyles
AP / Coaches; 10 / 11	AP / Coaches; 7 / 7
	1	2	3	4	Total
Duke	0	0	0	7	7
Arkansas	0	0	6	0	6
- Date: January 2, 1961
- Season: 1960
- Stadium: Cotton Bowl
- Location: Dallas, Texas
- MVP: Lance Alworth (Arkansas HB); Dwight Bumgarner (Duke T)
- Favorite: Arkansas by 7 points
- Referee: Carl Bredt (SWC; split crew: SWC, ACC)
- Attendance: 74,000

United States TV coverage
- Network: CBS
- Announcers: Jack Drees, Terry Brennan

The Cotton Bowl in Dallas, Texas, hosted the Cotton Bowl Classic.

The 1961 Cotton Bowl Classic was the 25th edition of the college football bowl game, played at the Cotton Bowl in Dallas, on Monday, January 2. Part of the 1960–61 bowl game season, it matched two conference champions, the seventh-ranked Arkansas Razorbacks of the Southwest Conference (SWC), and the No. 10 Duke Blue Devils of the Atlantic Coast Conference (ACC). With a late score, underdog Duke won 7–6, in front of 74,000 spectators.

New Year's Day was on Sunday in 1961; the major bowl games were played the following day.

== Teams ==
=== Arkansas ===
Arkansas won the Southwest Conference in 1960, led by junior star Lance Alworth (RB/PR/DB/P), who led the nation in punt return yardage, and was ninth in the country in kick return yardage. The Hogs defeated #11 Texas and #10 Rice, but lost to #20 Baylor and second-ranked Ole Miss.

It was the Razorbacks' third appearance in the Cotton Bowl, and the first under third-year head coach Frank Broyles.

=== Duke ===
Duke won the Atlantic Coast Conference, but lost its final two games, on the road at North Carolina and UCLA. The Blue Devils had four first team-all conference players. This was the program's sixth appearance in a major bowl, and first in the Cotton.

== Game summary ==
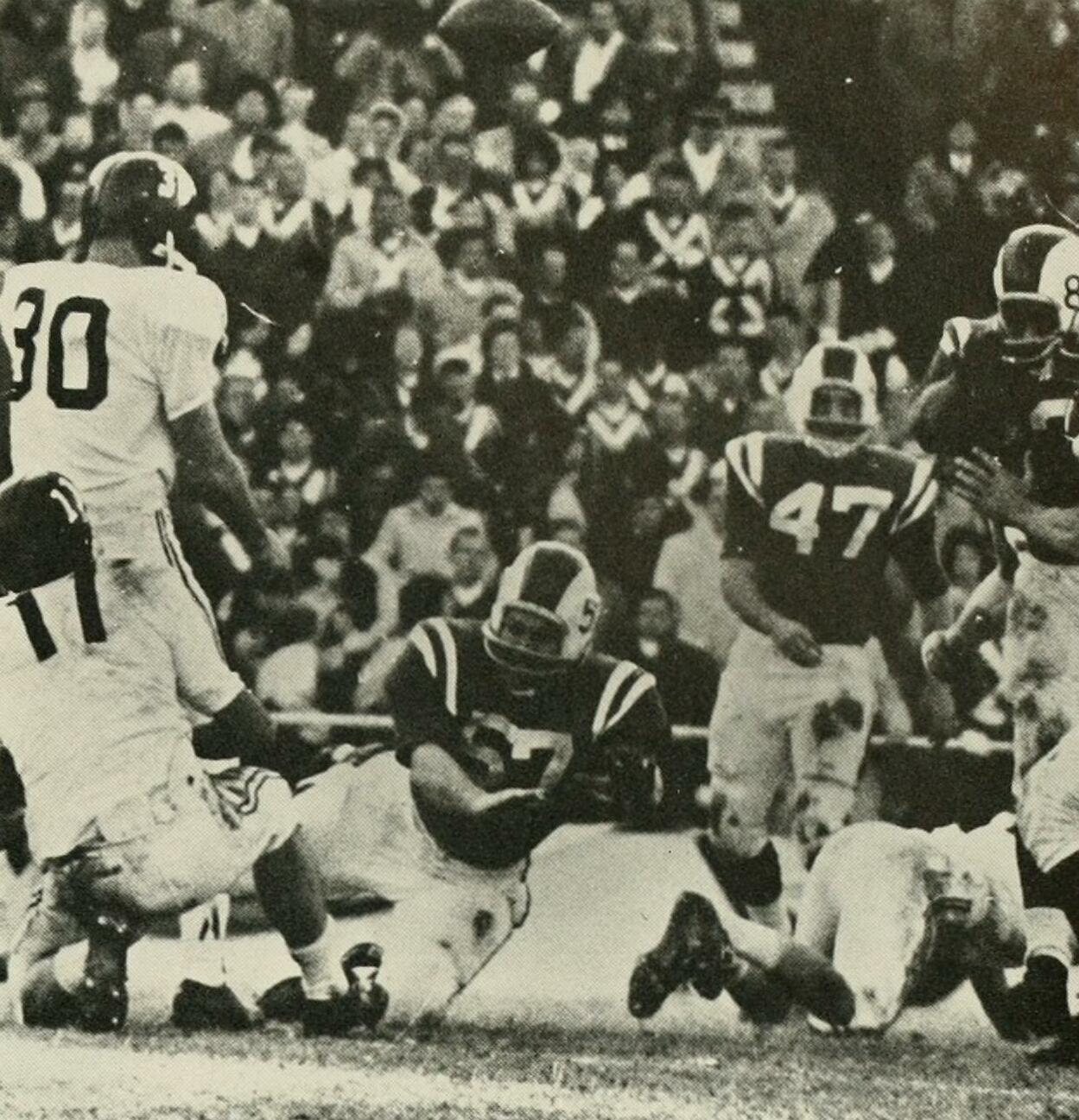
Photo of the 1961 Cotton Bowl Classic

In a game full of stars such as Lance Alworth of Arkansas and Don Altman and Tee Moorman of Duke, Dave Unser came up biggest. His block of Mickey Cissel's extra point attempt was the difference in the final score.

The games was scoreless until late in the third quarter. Alworth provided a memorable play when he snagged a high snap on a punt. Under pressure from Duke defenders, he then rolled right and sprinted upfield. While running he punted the ball deep, which went out at the Duke 2. Two plays later he returned a Duke punt for a touchdown. The kick was blocked by Unser, keeping the Hogs' lead at six points.

In the fourth quarter, the Blue Devils hooked together five passes from Altman to Moorman in one drive that culminated in the tying touchdown and go-ahead extra point.

Scoring summary

Quarter	Time	Drive			Team	Scoring information	Score	
Quarter	Time	Plays	Yards	TOP	Team	Scoring information	DUKE	ARK
3	2:53				ARK	49-yard punt return by Lance Alworth, Mickey Cissel kick blocked by Dave Unser	0	6
4	2:45	18	73		DUKE	Tee Moorman 9-yard touchdown reception from Don Altman, Art Browning kick good	7	6
"TOP" = time of possession. For other American football terms, see Glossary of American football.							7	6

Duke improved to 3–3 in bowl appearances, all in major bowls, while the Arkansas postseason record dropped to 2–2–2, with two losses and a tie in the Cotton Bowl.

== Aftermath ==
In the nineteen seasons under Broyles, Arkansas played in four Cotton Bowls and four Sugar Bowls; the 1964 team went undefeated.

It was the first of three consecutive conference titles for Duke, but the Blue Devils did not appear in another bowl game until 1989.

Duke did not earn another bowl victory until 2015, when the Blue Devils defeated Indiana in the Pinstripe Bowl.
