= James A. Baldwin =

American sportsperson (1886–1964)

James Baldwin
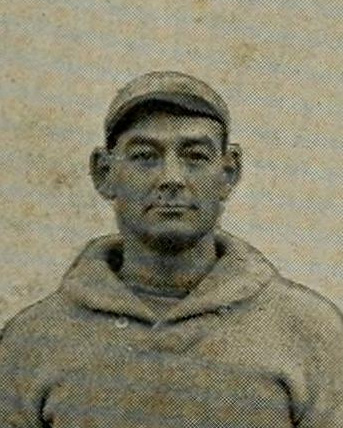

Biographical details
- Born: May 26, 1886; Manchester, New Hampshire, U.S.
- Died: August 2, 1964 (aged 78); Hyannis, Massachusetts, U.S.

Playing career

Football
- 1907: Dartmouth
- Position: Halfback

Coaching career (HC unless noted)

Football
- 1908: Somerville HS (MA)
- 1909–1912: Brockton HS (MA)
- 1913–1914: Passaic HS (NJ)
- 1915–1917: Rhode Island State
- 1919–1920: Maine
- 1921: Trinity (NC)
- 1922–1924: Lehigh
- 1926–1927: Wake Forest

Basketball
- 1916–1918: Rhode Island State
- 1920–1921: Maine
- 1921–1922: Trinity (NC)
- 1922–1925: Lehigh
- 1926–1928: Wake Forest

Baseball
- c. 1916: Rhode Island State
- 1923–1925: Lehigh

Administrative career (AD unless noted)
- 1916–1919: Rhode Island State
- 1920–1921: Maine

Head coaching record
- Overall: 43–36–16 (college football); 85–66 (college basketball); 32–25–1 (college baseball)

Accomplishments and honors

Championships
- Football; 2 Maine Intercollegiate Athletic Association (1919–1920)

James A. Baldwin (May 26, 1886 – August 2, 1964) was an American football player, track athlete, coach of football, basketball, and baseball, and college athletics administrator. A native of Somerville, Massachusetts, Baldwin played on the football, baseball, and track teams at Dartmouth College, from which he graduated in 1908.

Baldwin served as the head football coach at Rhode Island State College—now the University of Rhode Island, the University of Maine, Trinity College in Durham, North Carolina—now Duke University, Lehigh University, and Wake Forest University, compiling a career college football record of 43–37–16. Baldwin was also the head basketball coach at the same five schools, amassing a career college basketball mark of 85–66. In addition, he served as the head baseball coach at Rhode Island State and at Lehigh, tallying a career college baseball record of 32–25–1. From 1916 to 1919, Baldwin was the athletic director at Rhode Island State while he coached three sports.

== Death ==
Baldwin died on August 2, 1964, at a nursing home in Hyannis, Massachusetts.

== Head coaching record ==
=== College football ===
| Year | Team | Overall | Conference | Standing | Bowl/playoffs |
|---|---|---|---|---|---|
Rhode Island State (Athletic League of New England State Colleges) (1915–1917)
| 1915 | Rhode Island State | 3–5 | 0–1 | | |
| 1916 | Rhode Island State | 3–4–1 | 0–1 | | |
| 1917 | Rhode Island State | 2–4–2 | 0–0 | | |
| Rhode Island State: | | 8–13–3 | 0–2 | | |
Maine Black Bears (Maine Intercollegiate Athletic Association) (1919–1920)
| 1919 | Maine | 6–1 | 3–0 | 1st | |
| 1920 | Maine | 3–3–3 | 2–0–1 | 1st | |
| Maine: | | 9–4–3 | 5–0–1 | | |
Trinity Blue Blue and White (Independent) (1921)
| 1921 | Trinity | 6–1–2 | | | |
| Duke: | | 6–1–2 | | | |
Lehigh Brown and White (Independent) (1922–1924)
| 1922 | Lehigh | 3–5–1 | | | |
| 1923 | Lehigh | 6–2–1 | | | |
| 1924 | Lehigh | 4–1–3 | | | |
| Lehigh: | | 13–8–5 | | | |
Wake Forest Demon Deacons (Independent) (1926–1927)
| 1926 | Wake Forest | 5–4–1 | | | |
| 1927 | Wake Forest | 2–6–2 | | | |
| Wake Forest: | | 7–10–3 | | | |
| Total: | | 43–36–16 | | | |
National championship Conference title Conference division title or championship game berth

=== College basketball ===
Record table
| Season | Team | Overall | Conference | Standing | Postseason |
|---|---|---|---|---|---|
Rhode Island State (Independent) (1916–1918)
| 1916–17 | Rhode Island State | 2–6 | — | — | — |
| 1917–18 | Rhode Island State | 3–0 | — | — | — |
| Rhode Island State: | | 5–6 | | | |
Trinity Blue and White (Independent) (1921–1922)
| 1921–22 | Trinity | 6–12 | | | — |
| Trinity: | | 6–12 | | | |
Lehigh Engineers (Independent) (1922–1925)
| 1922–23 | Lehigh | 9–10 | | | — |
| 1923–24 | Lehigh | 12–3 | | | — |
| 1924–25 | Lehigh | 11–4 | | | — |
| Lehigh: | | 32–17 | | | |
Wake Forest Demon Deacons (Independent) (1926–1928)
| 1926–27 | Wake Forest | 22–3 | — | — | — |
| 1927–28 | Wake Forest | 6–14 | — | — | — |
| Wake Forest: | | 28–17 | | | |
| Total: | | 71–52 | | | |
