= 1995 Hall of Fame Bowl =

- 9th Hall of Fame Bowl
Wisconsin Badgers	Duke Blue Devils
(6–4–1)	(8–3)
Big Ten	ACC
34	20
Head coach: Barry Alvarez	Head coach: Fred Goldsmith
	AP / Coaches / BC; 25 / 21 / 24
	1	2	3	4	Total
Wisconsin	13	0	6	15	34
Duke	0	10	3	7	20
- Date: January 2, 1995
- Season: 1994
- Stadium: Tampa Stadium
- Location: Tampa, Florida
- MVP: Terrell Fletcher (Wisconsin RB)
- Referee: Jimmy Harper (SEC)

United States TV coverage
- Network: ESPN
- Announcers: Ron Franklin, Mike Gottfried

The 1995 Hall of Fame Bowl featured the 25th-ranked Duke Blue Devils and the unranked Wisconsin Badgers.

Wisconsin scored first on a 19-yard interception returned from a touchdown by Jeff Messenger, as Wisconsin opened a 7–0 lead. Wisconsin's John Hall kicked two field goals of 48 and 43 yards as Wisconsin increased its lead to 13–0 at the end of the 1st quarter. In the second quarter, Duke's Robert Baldwin scored on a 7-yard touchdown run to make it 13–7. Duke added a 30-yard field goal before halftime to pull within 13–10.

In the third quarter, a 30-yard Duke field goal tied the game at 13. Running back Terrell Fletcher responded with a 1-yard touchdown run to give Wisconsin a 20–13 lead. In the fourth quarter, Darrell Bevell fired an 11-yard touchdown pass to Jason Burns increasing the Badgers' lead to 27–13. Robert Baldwin scored on a two-yard touchdown run making it 27–20. Terrell Fletcher put the game away with a 49-yard rushing touchdown, making the final margin 34–20.

== Statistics ==
Statistics	Wisconsin	Duke
First downs	19	23
Rushing yards	48–278	29–68
Passing (C–A–I)	11–20–1	28–46–4
Passing yards	161	314
Total yards	446	399
Fumbles–lost	2–2	0–0
Penalties–yards	12–86	5–40
Punts–average	1–38.0	4–42.5
