= Bob Poe =

American politician anad businessman

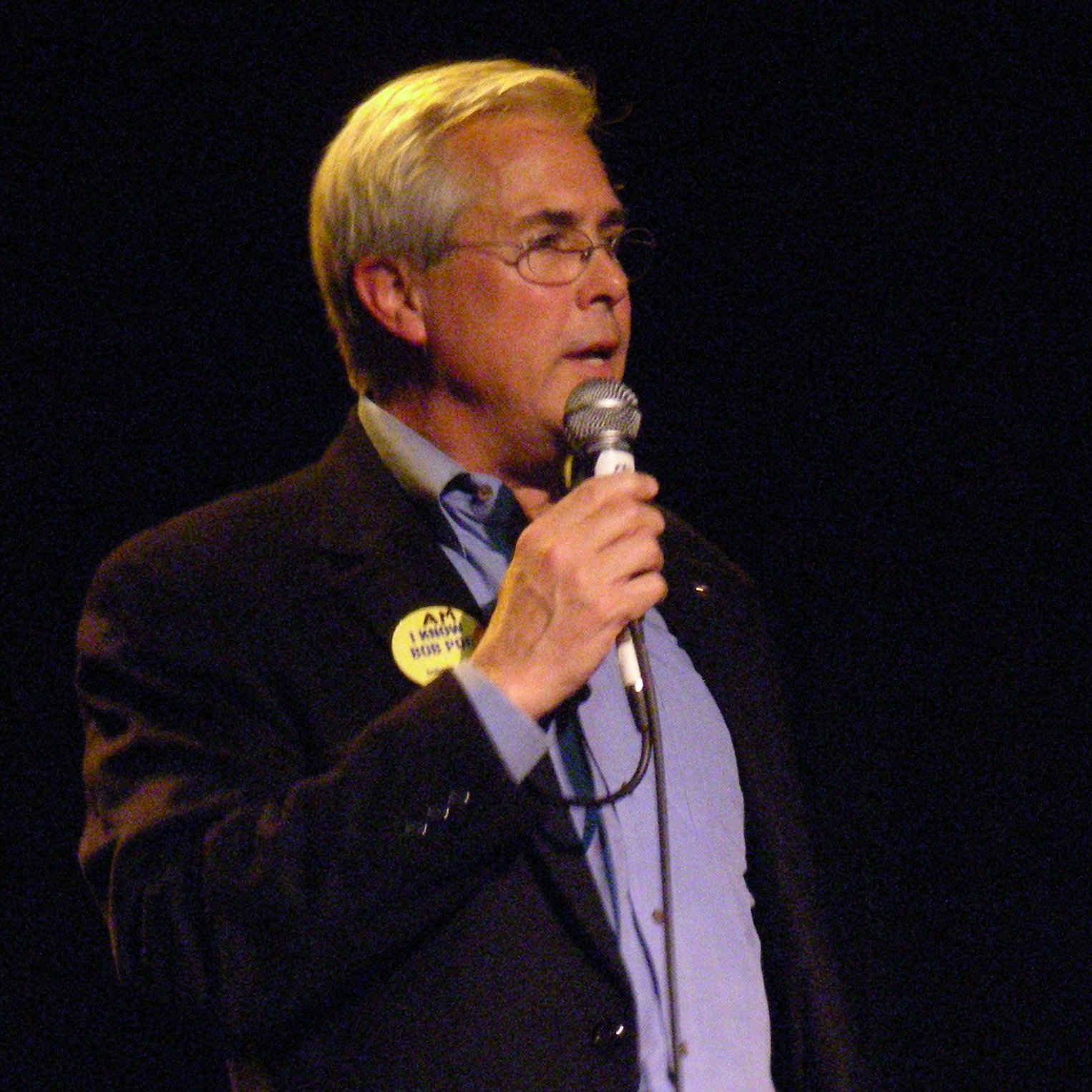
- Education: University of Missouri-St. Louis
- Occupations: Politician, businessman
- Political party: Democratic

Bob Poe is an American businessman and former cabinet member who ran for Governor of Alaska in the 2010 Alaska gubernatorial election. Poe announced his candidacy in January 2009 and was the first Democrat to announce his intention to run for governor. He has worked with various administrations in Alaska under former Governors Bill Sheffield, Steve Cowper, Tony Knowles, and Wally Hickel. On June 14, 2010 he announced that he was withdrawing from the gubernatorial race.

== Early life and education ==
Poe spent his early years in the Sherwood Forest neighborhood of Webster Groves, St. Louis, Missouri.

Poe's mother was a teacher, and his father received training in dentistry. Poe's father was forced to cease studying dentistry after he experienced momentary blindness.

He graduated from De Smet Jesuit High School. In 1977, he earned a bachelor's degree in business finance from the University of Missouri-St. Louis (UMSL). Poe studied for a Master of Business Administration from the same university, earning his degree in 1979 with a concentration in international finance and economics.

== Career ==
Around the time he earned his MBA, Poe took a job with the professional services firm Price Waterhouse as a business consultant, and was working in Springfield, Illinois when an opportunity with the company came up to design a new accounting system for the State of Alaska. Poe, who was an avid mountain climber, leaped at the opportunity to move to Alaska and arrived in the state capitol of Juneau in January 1981. The accounting system he created, which came to be known as the Alaska Statewide Accounting System (AKSAS), is still in use in 2009.

Democratic Governor Bill Sheffield offered Poe a position in Alaska's Office of Management and Budget in 1983, allowing him to work on creating a new budgeting system for the state.

In 1985, Poe went on to work for Coopers & Lybrand, working on financial projects including the valuation of Eklutna River hydroelectric dam and the Snettisham hydroelectric dam.

Democratic governor Steve Cowper asked Poe to be the deputy commissioner of transportation and public facilities in 1987. Under Poe's supervision, the Department of Transportation was able to provide a $240 million return to the state. In 1988, Governor Cowper appointed Poe as the director of international trade. Poe managed the state's international trade offices in Japan, Korea, and Taiwan, and was in charge of overseeing trade relations with the Russian government.

By 1993, Poe was working for the state Senate Finance Committee, and reported to Republican state senator Drue Pearce. He was appointed by (at the time, Alaskan Independence Party member) Governor Wally Hickel, as Director of Administrative Services for the Alaska Department of Environment Conservation.

Poe began working for the state again in 1997 when Governor Knowles asked him to take over as Business Development Manager of the Alaska Industrial Development and Export Authority (AIDEA). In 1998, Poe was asked by Governor Knowles to be the Y2K Senior Project Manager, in addition to appointing him Commissioner of Administration, a confirmed cabinet position that Poe held until he was appointed as Executive Director of AIDEA and the Alaska Energy Authority in 2000.

Poe became the vice president of the ASCG Inc., a subsidiary of the Arctic Slope Regional Corporation, and in 2004 he became the president and CEO of the Anchorage Economic Development Corporation (AEDC).

Poe, in his early adulthood, was a registered Democrat. When he was employed by Republican state senator Drue Pearce, he momentarily registered as a Republican. In January 2009, Poe proclaimed his intent to run as a Democratic candidate for governor. In the intervening periods of time, he was an undeclared voter. Poe characterizes himself as a fiscal conservative and as a pro-business, pro-development Democrat.

== Run for governor ==
On January 8, 2009, Bob Poe announced his candidacy for Governor of Alaska in the 2010 Alaska gubernatorial election. He was the first Democrat to announce his intention to run for Governor of Alaska. Poe withdrew from the gubernatorial race in June 2010 because he did not have enough funds.
