= De Smet Jesuit High School =

Catholic school in Missouri, United States

Coordinates: 38.6612°N 90.4449°W

De Smet Jesuit

Location
- 233 North New Ballas Road; Creve Coeur, Missouri 63141; United States

Information
- Type: Private college-preparatory school
- Motto: Latin: Ad Majorem Dei Gloriam (For the Greater Glory of God)
- Religious affiliation: Roman Catholic
- Established: 1967; 59 years ago
- Founder: Society of Jesus
- Authority: Archdiocese of St. Louis
- Oversight: Society of Jesus
- President: Rev. Ronny O'Dwyer, SJ
- Principal: Kevin Poelker
- Chaplain: James Burshek, SJ
- Teaching staff: 79.5 (FTE) (2021–22)
- Grades: 9–12
- Gender: Boys
- Student to teacher ratio: 8.1 (2021–22)
- Colors: Maroon and white
- Athletics conference: Metro Catholic Conference
- Mascot: Sparty
- Nickname: Spartans
- Accreditation: Cognia
- Newspaper: The Mirror
- Yearbook: Spartan Olympiad
- Tuition: $20,895 (2024–25)
- Affiliation: ISSL; ISACS; NAIS
- Website: desmet.org

De Smet Jesuit High School is a Catholic college-preparatory school for boys in Creve Coeur, Missouri, in the Archdiocese of Saint Louis.

The school began classes in the fall of 1967. It was named in honor of the Belgian Jesuit Great Plains missionary Pierre-Jean De Smet. De Smet will expand to add a middle school beginning with the 2025-26 school year, using excess space in the existing school building. Initial plans are for classes of sixty students each in grades 6, 7, and 8, with room for additional growth in the future.

== Academics ==
Honors courses are offered in math, English, foreign language, social studies, fine arts, and science, totaling 130 college credit hours. Honors students average a score of 31 on the ACT, and grades for honors courses are weighted when calculating grade-point average. The entire curriculum is college prep, but there is a full-service learning center to assist students needing extra help. All students lease a tablet PC, featuring a pen and multi-touch display as well as speech/audio recognition. Moodle is used to facilitate teacher communication with students and parents.

De Smet Jesuit facilities include a 353-seat performing arts theater.

== Athletics ==
De Smet Jesuit fields 53 teams in 19 sports, four of them non-cut. De Smet Jesuit competes in the large school division in the Missouri State High School Activities Association (MSHSAA) and has won 44 state championships: basketball seven times (1973, 1978, 1979, 1982, 1999, 2024, 2026), soccer six times (1991, 1993, 1995, 1997, 2011, 2019), golf five times (1983, 1985, 1986, 2003, 2021), hockey (Mid-States Club Hockey Association) 17 times, tennis twice (1986, 1987), football three times (2005, 2019, 2024), baseball twice (2000, 2019), swimming and diving once (2002), cross country once (1983), and water polo once (2010). The school competes in the Metro Catholic Conference along with fellow private schools Chaminade College Preparatory School, Christian Brothers College High School, St. Louis University High School, and St. John Vianney High School. De Smet Jesuit has won the MCC All-Sports Trophy 11 times in the 21-year existence of the conference.

=== Basketball ===
Three of De Smet Jesuit's seven state basketball championships came under coach Rich Grawer, who went on to coach at University of Missouri and St. Louis University. His 1979 team went undefeated, 32–0. His teams also established the current Missouri state large-school record for winning streaks at 63 games.

=== Football ===
The Spartans won the 2005 Missouri Class 6 State Championship under head coach Patrick Mahoney and now have won the 2019 Missouri Class 6 State Championship under current head coach, former Dallas Cowboys and Minnesota Vikings and Class of 2008 alumnus Robert Steeples. De Smet added a third football state championship in 2024. Recent notable athletes at De Smet Jesuit include Ray Agnew III, Robert Steeples, KeVonn Mabon. and Christian Gray.

=== Soccer ===
The soccer program has captured six state titles, four of which occurred during a seven year run in the 1990s, winning championships in alternating years: 1991, 1993, 1995, and 1997. The fifth came in 2011. Longtime head coach Greg Vitello led the program from 1969 to 2014. He is the third-winningest high school coach in United States history. During his time at De Smet, Vitello won five state championships and 33 district championships, and paved the way for five young men to compete on the US national team. Notable players under Vitello included 1987 National Gatorade player of the year Brian Donnelly; 1998 Parade Magazine Soccer Player of the Year Bill McKeon; his brother Matt McKeon, the 1991 Gatorade Circle of Champions Soccer Player of the Year and the 1995 National Collegiate Player of the Year; Chris Klein, the 1993 St. Louis Post-Dispatch Player of the Year; Pat Noonan, the 1997 St. Louis Post-Dispatch Player of the Year; Mike Ambersley, a 2000 Parade Magazine All American and Missouri Player of the Year; and Will Bruin, a 2008 Parade Magazine All-American, a three-time Missouri State High School Soccer Coaches Association Player of the Year, the 2007 Gatorade Missouri Player of the Year and the 2007 Post-Dispatch Player of the Year. Vitello stepped down in 2014, which vaulted Class of 1997 alum Josh Klein to the head coaching position.

== Campus ministry ==
A student Core Team, composed of juniors and seniors who meet during homeroom, is vitally involved in invigorating all aspects of the Campus Ministry program. Students are, further, encouraged to write prayers for the opening and closing of the school day and reflections for the Friday Holy Hour, and plan liturgies; they also network with youth groups at other schools and parishes.

=== Retreat program ===
All freshmen make the El Camino retreat in which they come to see life as a journey, with role models, heroes, and acceptance of oneself. It is led by seniors and includes team-building exercises, small-group discussions, and faith sharing. The Kairos retreat runs three days and is led by seniors who have made it. It emphasizes peer leadership and ministry to build solidarity, based on the experience of God's love in our lives. Follow-up gatherings are held for those attending the retreat. The senior retreat lasts two full days and introduces retreatants to various methods of prayer from St. Ignatius’ Spiritual Exercises, directed toward a facility at finding God in all things.

=== Service program ===
Freshmen serve the school community at school events. Sophomores assist at school and are also encouraged to volunteer in their neighborhood and church communities. Juniors select from more than 120 area service agencies; they go out on Mondays and their experiences are incorporated into class on Tuesdays. Many are drawn to tutoring children or recreating with them, at inner-city grade schools, homeless shelters, and in Head Start programs; they also work with children having learning disabilities, physical disabilities, autism, or behavioral disorders. The elderly in nursing homes offer a mutually enriching experience for many. Seniors continue on and deepen their experience from junior year. There have also been service-learning trips to Honduras, Belize, South Dakota, and New Orleans, to learn and grow by working with those in need.

The school uses graduates of Jesuit schools as Alum Service Corps volunteers and 17 of these have become full-time teachers at De Smet Jesuit.

=== Liturgies and spirituality ===
Mass is celebrated daily at 8:00 am. Each Friday there is a Holy Hour along with the Sacrament of Reconciliation. Ten large Eucharistic celebrations are held throughout the year, incorporating Holy Days or special events like Mass of the Holy Spirit, Missioning, Thanksgiving, Fr. De Smet's birthday, family Masses with BBQ or breakfast, Ring Mass, and graduation.

A Christian Life Community group meets weekly for prayer and reflection, focused on Ignatius’ Spiritual Exercises and on finding God in one's daily life. De Smet in Prayer (DIP) has a breakfast meeting before school once each week to discuss, reflect, and pray together on living out one's faith as brothers in the Lord.

In 2016, three De Smet Jesuit students won the North American sector of the St. Francis Xavier Global Instagram Competition whose purpose was "to convey a message of hope, zeal, sustainability, diversity and belonging to a global community."

== Notable alumni ==
=== Athletics ===
- Ray Agnew III – former NFL player and pro scout for the New York Jets
- Blake Ahearn – assistant coach for the Memphis Grizzlies of the National Basketball Association (NBA)
- Mike Ambersley – MLS forward
- Sam Bick – played for US national soccer team
- Will Bruin – Major League Soccer forward for Seattle Sounders FC
- Eric Delabar – professional soccer player, manager of Maryville University's men's and women's teams
- Jakub Dobeš – Montreal Canadiens hockey player, Big 10 Freshman and Goaltender of the Year at Ohio State University (attended but did not graduate)
- Trent Frederic – Edmonton Oilers hockey player, former Boston Bruins hockey player, Big 10 Freshman of the Year at the University of Wisconsin, 2016 first-round draft pick
- Steve Fuchs – played for US national soccer team
- Christian Gray – college football cornerback for the Notre Dame Fighting Irish
- Bob Keppel – Major League Baseball pitcher
- Chris Klein - president of Los Angeles Galaxy and MLS midfielder
- KeVonn Mabon – former NFL wide receiver for Tennessee Titans
- Mac Markway – college football tight end for the LSU Tigers and the Nebraska Cornhuskers
- Matt McKeon – played for US National and Olympic soccer team, MLS midfielder, Hermann Trophy recipient
- Bill Mueller – MLB third baseman, 2003 American League batting champion
- Pat Noonan – assistant coach for US National Soccer Team and Los Angeles Galaxy, former Major League Soccer forward
- Michael Plassmeyer - MLB pitcher
- Steve Stipanovich - McDonald’s high school all-American, University of Missouri, and Indiana Pacers
- Tony Vitello – University of Tennessee baseball head coach and current San Francisco Giants manager
- Mekhi Wingo – defensive tackle for the Detroit Lions

=== Government ===
- Henry Autrey – United States federal judge, Eastern District of Missouri, also the first graduate from the first graduating class of 1971
- Tom Dempsey – Missouri state senator
- John Diehl – Former speaker of the Missouri House of Representatives
- Bob Poe – Former director of International Trade and Commissioner of Administration for the state of Alaska. Became the president and CEO of the Anchorage Economic Development Corporation in 2004. In 2010, Poe became the first man in the history of Alaska to run for governor as a Democrat.
- Eric Schmitt – Current United States senator, Missouri state treasurer and Missouri Attorney General.
