= A. J. Greene =

American football player (born 1966)

No. 21, 22
- Position: Cornerback

Personal information
- Born: June 24, 1966 (age 60); Hendersonville, North Carolina, U.S.
- Listed height: 5 ft 8 in (1.73 m)
- Listed weight: 167 lb (76 kg)

Career information
- High school: East Henderson (East Flat Rock, North Carolina)
- College: Wake Forest (1985–1988)
- NFL draft: 1989: 9th round, 245th overall pick

Career history
- New York Giants (1989)*; Tampa Bay Buccaneers (1990)*; Barcelona Dragons (1991); New York Giants (1991); Barcelona Dragons (1992)
- * Offseason or practice squad member only

Awards and highlights
- 2× First-team All-ACC (1987, 1988)
- Stats at Pro Football Reference

Anthony Jerome Greene (born June 24, 1966) is an American former professional football cornerback who played for the New York Giants of the National Football League (NFL). He played college football at Wake Forest, and was selected by the Giants in the ninth round of the 1989 NFL draft.

== Early life ==
Anthony Jerome Greene was born on June 24, 1966, in Hendersonville, North Carolina. He attended East Henderson High School in East Flat Rock, North Carolina.

== College career ==
Greene played college football for the Demon Deacons of Wake Forest University, and was a four-year letterman from 1985 to 1988. He set the school's single-season interceptions record with seven in 1987. That same season, he also tied Nick Sacrinty's 1945 Wake Forest record for single-game interceptions with four. Greene was named first-team All-Atlantic Coast Conference by the Associated Press in both 1987 and 1988. He finished his college career with 17 interceptions, tied with Ronnie Burgess for the most in school history. Greene also blocked seven punts in college, and returned 41 punts for 328 yards and two kicks for 46 yards.

== Professional career ==
Greene was selected by the New York Giants in the ninth round, with the 245th overall pick, of the 1989 NFL draft. He officially signed with the team on July 24. He was released on September 4 and signed to the Giants' practice squad on September 6, where he spent the entire 1989 NFL season.

Greene became a free agent afterwards, and signed with the Tampa Bay Buccaneers on April 25, 1990. He was placed on injured reserve on August 20, 1990, and later released.

On February 24, 1991, Greene was selected by the Barcelona Dragons of the World League of American Football (WLAF) in the 1991 WLAF draft. He started all ten games for the Dragons during the 1991 WLAF season, posting 40 tackles, three interceptions for 22 yards, and 12 pass breakups. Barcelona lost in World Bowl '91 to the London Monarchs by a score of 21–0.

On October 30, 1991, Greene was signed by the Giants to provide depth at cornerback and on special teams after a series of injuries in the team's secondary. He played in two regular season games before being released on November 13, 1991.

Greene returned to the Dragons for the 1992 WLAF season and recorded three interceptions for 16 yards.

== Personal life ==
Greene's brother, Tiger Greene, also played in the NFL.

== See also ==
- Wake Forest Demon Deacons football statistical leaders
