= Tiger Greene =

American football player (born 1962)

No. 33, 23
- Position: Safety

Personal information
- Born: February 15, 1962 (age 64); Hendersonville, North Carolina, U.S.
- Listed height: 6 ft 0 in (1.83 m)
- Listed weight: 194 lb (88 kg)

Career information
- High school: East Henderson (East Flat Rock, North Carolina)
- College: Western Carolina
- NFL draft: 1985: undrafted

Career history
- Atlanta Falcons (1985); Green Bay Packers (1986–1990); Miami Dolphins (1992)*; Charlotte Rage (1993)
- * Offseason or practice squad member only

Career NFL statistics
- Interceptions: 6
- Sacks: 4
- INT yards: 38
- Stats at Pro Football Reference
- Stats at ArenaFan.com

George Everett "Tiger" Greene (born February 15, 1962) is a former safety in the NFL. He played for the Atlanta Falcons and Green Bay Packers. His brother, A. J. Greene, also played in the NFL.
