= Denzel Rice =

American football player (born 1993)

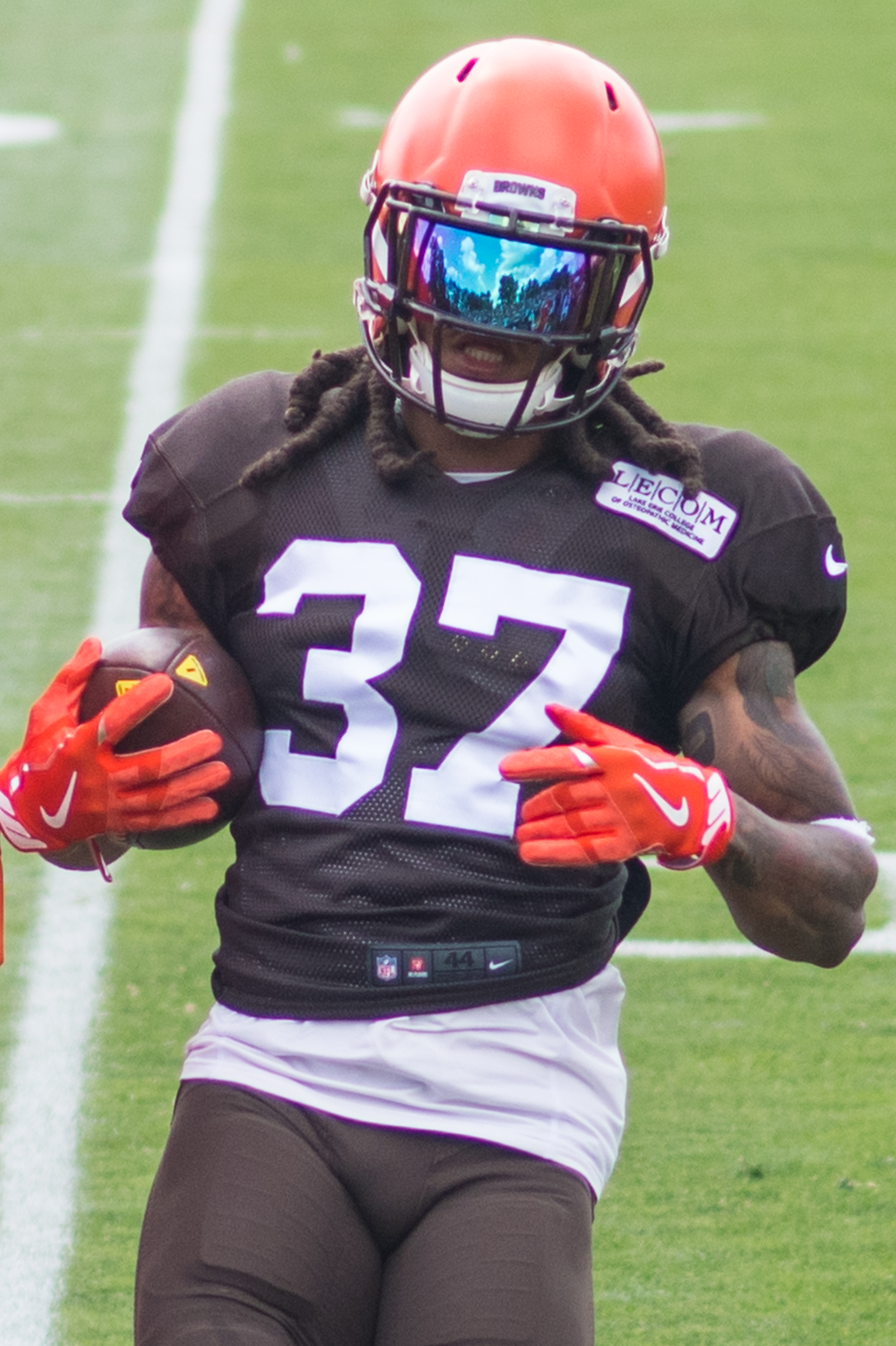
- Denzel Rice in 2018 training camp

No. 35, 22, 37
- Position: Cornerback

Personal information
- Born: March 31, 1993 (age 33); Winston-Salem, North Carolina, U.S.
- Listed height: 6 ft 0 in (1.83 m)
- Listed weight: 196 lb (89 kg)

Career information
- High school: Carver (Winston-Salem)
- College: Coastal Carolina
- NFL draft: 2015: undrafted

Career history
- Philadelphia Eagles (2015); Houston Texans (2016); Indianapolis Colts (2017)*; Cleveland Browns (2018); Buffalo Bills (2018); Baltimore Ravens (2019)*; TSL Blues (2021)
- * Offseason or practice squad member only

Career NFL statistics
- Total tackles: 14
- Pass deflections: 1
- Interceptions: 1
- Stats at Pro Football Reference

Denzel Rice (born March 31, 1993) is an American former professional football player who was a cornerback in the National Football League (NFL). He played college football for the Coastal Carolina Chanticleers.

== Professional career ==
=== Philadelphia Eagles ===
Rice was signed by the Philadelphia Eagles as an undrafted free agent in 2015. On August 28, 2016, Rice was waived by the Eagles.

=== Houston Texans ===
On October 19, 2016, Rice was signed to the Houston Texans' practice squad. He was promoted to the active roster on December 10, 2016.

On September 2, 2017, Rice was waived/injured by the Texans and placed on injured reserve. He was released on September 8, 2017.

=== Indianapolis Colts ===
On November 6, 2017, Rice was signed to the Indianapolis Colts' practice squad.

=== Cleveland Browns ===
On January 31, 2018, Rice signed a reserve/future contract with the Cleveland Browns. He made the Browns final roster, playing in eight games before being waived on November 7, 2018.

=== Buffalo Bills ===
On November 13, 2018, Rice was signed to the Buffalo Bills practice squad. He was promoted to the active roster on December 4, 2018. He was released on August 31, 2019.

=== Baltimore Ravens ===
On October 15, 2019, Rice was signed to the Baltimore Ravens practice squad. His practice squad contract with the team expired on January 20, 2020.
