= Office of the Federal Coordinator, Alaska Natural Gas Transportation Projects =

The Office of the Federal Coordinator, Alaska Natural Gas Transportation Projects is an independent agency of the U.S. government. Congress created the Office in the Alaska Natural Gas Pipeline Act of 2004.

The intent of that law is to help ease forward a multibillion-dollar Alaska natural gas pipeline project that would deliver North Slope gas to consumers in the 48 contiguous states.

Congress directed the Office of the Federal Coordinator to expedite and coordinate federal permitting for construction of a pipeline. The Office coordinates with over 20 federal agencies, the Canadian federal government, the State of Alaska, tribal governments and other stakeholders.

With some exceptions, the law empowers the Office to prohibit a federal agency from including “in any certificate, right-of-way, permit, lease, or other authorization issued to an Alaska natural gas transportation project any term or condition that may be permitted, but is not required, by any applicable law,” if the term or condition would prevent or significantly impair construction, operation or expansion of the natural gas pipeline project.

The Federal Coordinator (director of the agency) is nominated with advice and consent of the Senate by the President of the United States. Drue Pearce was the first federal coordinator; she was nominated by George W. Bush and served from December 12, 2006 through January 3, 2010. Larry Persily was the coordinator during the presidency of Barack Obama, who nominated him on December 9, 2009, and was confirmed by the United States Senate on March 10, 2010.

== See also ==
- 2004 in the environment
- Energy law
