= Carver High School (North Carolina) =

Public school in Winston-Salem, North Carolina, United States

Location
- 3545 Carver School Road; Winston-Salem, North Carolina 27105; United States; 36°08′05″N 80°12′29″W

Information
- School type: Traditional, public
- Founded: 1936 (90 years ago)
- School board: Winston-Salem/Forsyth County Schools
- Superintendent: Dr. Don Phipps
- CEEB code: 344417
- Principal: Carol Montague-Davis
- Staff: 51.75 (FTE)
- Grades: 9–12
- Enrollment: 694 (2023-2024)
- Student to teacher ratio: 13.41
- Language: English
- Colors: Royal blue and gold
- Mascot: Yellowjacket
- Newspaper: The Courier
- Yearbook: Apiary
- Website: www.wsfcs.k12.nc.us/o/chs

Carver High School is a traditional public high school located in Winston-Salem, North Carolina, United States. It serves students in grade levels 9–12 as part of the Winston-Salem/Forsyth County Schools system. This historically black school was named for George Washington Carver. The school colors are blue and gold and the mascot is the yellow jacket.

There are 966 students who attend Carver High School and 94 staff members. Over 100 of these students attend the Career Center in Winston-Salem to take alternate courses not offered at Carver.

== History ==
Carver School was founded in 1936 as an African American school for all grade levels. In 1963, Carver became an integrated school serving grade levels 7–12. In 1971, the school changed to serving only grades 9 and 10. In 1984, Carver High School changed back to being a traditional high school, serving grades 9–12.

In 2013 a student shot another student at the school and was arrested by a school resource officer. The shooter Christopher Lamont Richardson, who was 18 at the time of the shooting, was sentenced to between two years and three years, two months in prison. He was also placed on supervised probation for three years.

== Achievements ==
Carver High School currently holds the record for the most students in Forsyth County to be signed up for the It's My Call program. This program promotes a commitment to a healthy and drug-free lifestyle.

The Carver Drill Team, one of the many extra curricular activities is the JROTC program offers. The CHS JROTC has held numerous top placements in not only the Eastern Region Championships, but in the National High School Drill Team Championships as well. In the 2007 Army Eastern Region Championships the team placed first in Armed Exhibition with a score never before achieved by any team in this level of competition.

The Carver High School football team has won 13 conference championships. They were also NCHSAA 3-A Football State Champions in 1998 and 2002.

== Organizations ==
Student organizations include Carver Against Destructive Decisions in Youth (C.A.D.D.Y.), a branch of the national SADD (Students Against Destructive Decisions), Drill Team, Colorguard, Raider Team, Drama Club, Crosby Scholars, Marching Band, Teen Forum, Student Council, Academic Team, Quill and Scroll, Serteen Club, Ebony Society, Gospel Choir, National Honor Society, We Mentor, Carver Ambassadors, Visible Voice, Men of Distinction, and Daughters of Destiny.

== Sports ==
Carver High School is a part of the North Carolina High School Athletic Association (NCHSAA). Its mascot is the Yellow Jacket, with the school colors being blue and gold.

CHS has sports teams that include Varsity Soccer, Varsity Football, Junior Varsity (JV) Football, Varsity Cheerleaders, Junior Varsity Cheerleaders, Sweet Stingers, Flag Divas, Varsity Boys Basketball, Junior Varsity Boys Basketball, Varsity Girls Basketball, Junior Varsity Girls Basketball, Varsity Baseball, Junior Varsity Baseball, Softball, Volleyball, Indoor Track, Spring Track, Wrestling, Bowling, Golf, and Tennis.

=== State Championships ===
Carver has won the following NCHSAA team state championships:

- Women's Basketball: 2001 (3A), 2007 (3A)
- Football: 1998 (3A), 2002 (3A)

== Journalism ==
The Carver High School newspaper is known as The Courier. Apiary, the school yearbook, released Volume XXIV of its publication at the end of the 2007–08 school year. Visible Voice is Carver High School's literary magazine that is published by students online. All of Carver's publications are worked on by student organizations under the guidance of teacher advisors.

== Notable alumni ==
- Ray Agnew — former NFL player and director of pro personal for the Los Angeles Rams
- Clint Basinger — Head of LGR (formerly Lazy Game Reviews)YouTube channel
- Chris Hairston — NFL offensive tackle
- Camille Little — WNBA player
- Tasha Marbury — reality television personality, cast member of VH1's reality series Basketball Wives
- Denzel Rice — NFL cornerback
- Megan Smith — college softball head coach
