= Terry Allen (running back) =

American football player and coach (born 1968)

No. 21, 22, 20, 29
- Position: Running back

Personal information
- Born: February 21, 1968 (age 58); Commerce, Georgia, U.S.
- Listed height: 5 ft 11 in (1.80 m)
- Listed weight: 208 lb (94 kg)

Career information
- High school: Banks County (Homer, Georgia)
- College: Clemson (1986–1989)
- NFL draft: 1990: 9th round, 241st overall pick

Career history

Playing
- Minnesota Vikings (1990–1994); Washington Redskins (1995–1998); New England Patriots (1999); New Orleans Saints (2000); Baltimore Ravens (2001); New Orleans Saints (2002)*
- * Offseason or practice squad member only

Coaching
- Arizona Cardinals (2018) Bill Bidwill fellowship/Assistant running backs coach

Awards and highlights
- Second-team All-Pro (1996); Pro Bowl (1996); NFL rushing touchdowns leader (1996); 80 Greatest Redskins; 2× First-team All-ACC (1987, 1988); Second-team All-ACC (1989); ACC Rookie of the Year (1987)

Career NFL statistics
- Rushing yards: 8,614
- Rushing average: 4
- Receptions: 204
- Receiving yards: 1,601
- Total touchdowns: 79
- Stats at Pro Football Reference

Terry Thomas Allen Jr. (born February 21, 1968) is an American former professional football player who was a running back in the National Football League (NFL) for 11 seasons. Allen played college football for the Clemson Tigers. He was selected by the Minnesota Vikings in the ninth round of the 1990 NFL draft.

Between 1992 and 1996, Allen had four consecutive seasons of rushing for 1,000 or more yards, minus the 1993 season which he missed completely due to an injury. Terry is married to Annette Allen and they have two daughters, Shayna and Haley Allen.

== Professional career ==
=== Minnesota Vikings ===
During Allen's rookie season, he was the second string running back behind Herschel Walker. The next season, the Vikings named Allen as the starter, and he rushed for 1,201 yards and 13 touchdowns. He also caught 49 passes for 478 yards and 2 touchdowns. In the summer of 1993, Allen tore his ACL in practice and missed the entire 1993 season. In 1994, Allen returned. Despite dealing with two bad ACL's, he was able to amass 1,031 rushing yards and 8 touchdowns.

=== Washington Redskins ===
Allen joined the Washington Redskins for the 1995 season and rushed for 1,309 yards and 10 touchdowns. During the 1996 season, his second with the Redskins, he gathered 21 rushing touchdowns. He was the fifth player to record 20 rushing touchdowns in a season and only five other players have achieved the mark since Allen did it in 1996. He also had another career best in the 1996 season; besides 21 rushing touchdowns, he ran for 1,353 yards, which earned him a spot in the Pro Bowl. After the 1996 season, he played with Washington for only two more seasons and ran for 700 or more yards in each season.

=== New England Patriots ===
In 1999, Allen played for the New England Patriots, where he ran for nearly 900 yards with 8 rushing touchdowns.

=== New Orleans Saints ===
Allen had the worst season of his career with the New Orleans Saints in 2000, when he was forced into action after starting running back Ricky Williams broke his ankle.

=== Baltimore Ravens ===
On August 12, 2001, Allen signed with the Ravens following a season ending injury to Jamal Lewis, reuniting with Brian Billick, who was his offensive coordinator with the Vikings. He led the Ravens in rushing yards in his one season with the team, rushing for 658 yards.

== NFL career statistics ==
Year	Team	Games		Rushing					Receiving				
Year	Team	GP	GS	Att	Yds	Avg	Lng	TD	Rec	Yds	Avg	Lng	TD
1991	MIN	15	6	120	563	4.7	55	2	6	49	8.2	21	1
1992	MIN	16	16	266	1,201	4.5	51	13	49	478	9.8	36	2
1993	MIN	0	0	Did not play due to injury									
1994	MIN	16	16	255	1,031	4.0	45	8	17	148	8.7	31	0
1995	WAS	16	16	338	1,309	3.9	28	10	31	232	7.5	24	1
1996	WAS	16	16	347	1,353	3.9	49	21	32	194	6.1	28	0
1997	WAS	10	10	210	724	3.4	34	4	20	172	8.6	38	1
1998	WAS	10	10	148	700	4.7	45	2	17	128	7.5	17	0
1999	NE	16	13	254	896	3.5	39	8	14	125	8.9	38	1
2000	NO	4	3	46	179	3.9	18	2	1	7	7.0	7	0
2001	BAL	11	8	168	658	3.9	26	3	17	68	4.0	11	1
Career		130	114	2,152	8,614	4.0	55	73	204	1,601	7.8	38	6
