= Ray Agnew III =

American football player and executive (born 1991)

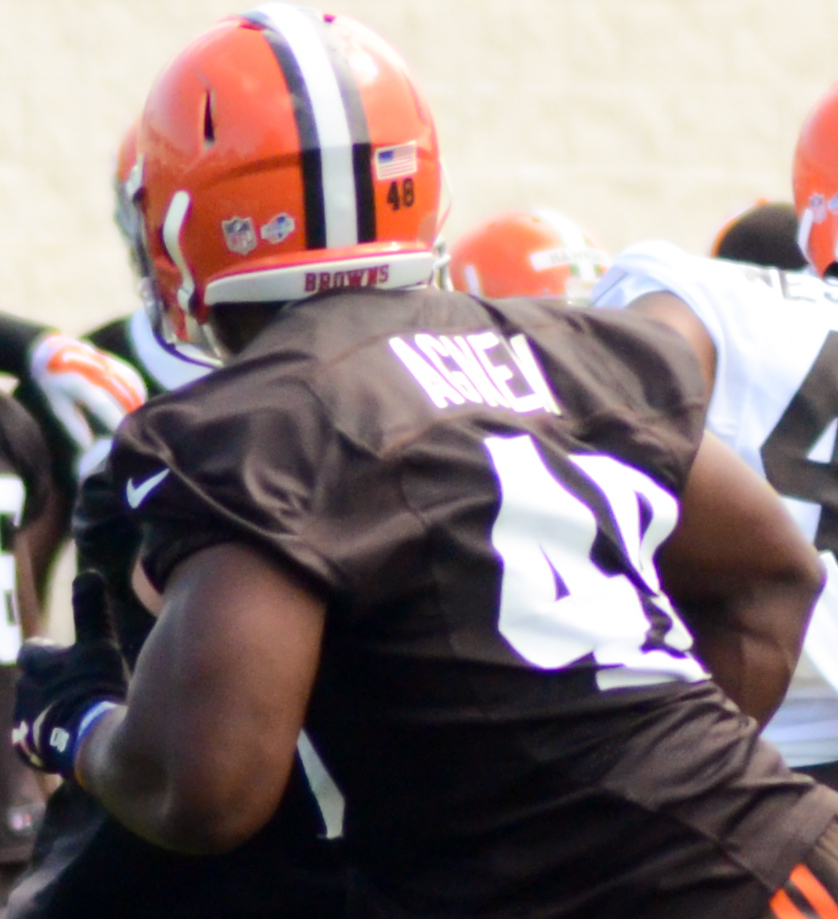
- Agnew in 2014

New York Jets
- Title: College scout

Personal information
- Born: February 26, 1991 (age 35); Winston-Salem, North Carolina, U.S.
- Listed height: 5 ft 10 in (1.78 m)
- Listed weight: 247 lb (112 kg)

Career information
- Position: Fullback (No. 48)
- High school: De Smet Jesuit (Creve Coeur, Missouri)
- College: Southern Illinois (2010–2013)
- NFL draft: 2014: undrafted

Career history

Playing
- Cleveland Browns (2014); Dallas Cowboys (2015)*; Washington Redskins (2015)*
- * Offseason or practice squad member only

Operations
- New York Jets (2017–2018) Seasonal personnel assistant; New York Jets (2019–present); Pro scout (2019-2024); College scout (2025-present)

Career NFL statistics
- Rushing yards: 2
- Rushing TDs: 0
- Receptions: 3
- Receiving yards: 15
- Receiving TDs: 0
- Stats at Pro Football Reference

Ray Mitchell Agnew III (born February 26, 1991) is an American professional football executive and former fullback who is a scout for the New York Jets of the National Football League (NFL).

He played college football for the Southern Illinois Salukis and signed as an undrafted free agent by the Cleveland Browns in 2014.

== Early life ==
Agnew was born on February 26, 1991, in Winston-Salem, North Carolina. He played high school football for the De Smet Jesuit High School Spartans. He was a three-year starter at running back and two-year starter at linebacker. He was a two-time first-team all-Metro Catholic Conference selection. Agnew also excelled in track & field, recording a top-throw of 14.78 meters (48 ft, 3 in) in the shot put at the 2009 MSHSAA Class 4 District 2, where he placed 3rd.

== College career ==
Agnew played from 2010 to 2013 for the Southern Illinois Salukis. He was redshirted in 2009.

== Professional career ==
=== Cleveland Browns ===
Agnew was signed by the Cleveland Browns on May 12, 2014, after going undrafted in the 2014 NFL draft. He made his NFL Debut on September 7, 2014, against the Pittsburgh Steelers, recording two rushing yards on one rushing attempt.

He was waived by the Browns on October 20, 2014 and re-signed by the team on November 11, 2014.

He was released by the Browns on December 23, 2014.

=== Dallas Cowboys ===
Agnew signed with the Dallas Cowboys on March 13, 2015. He was released by the Cowboys on September 5, 2015.

=== Washington Redskins ===
The Washington Redskins signed Agnew to their practice squad on September 7, 2015. He was released by the Redskins on September 15, 2015.

== Executive career ==
Following his playing career, Agnew joined the New York Jets as a seasonal personnel assistant. In 2019, he was hired full-time by the Jets to serve as a pro scout in their scouting department.

== Personal life ==
Agnew and his fiancé now reside in New Jersey. Agnew is the son of Ray Agnew, the assistant general manager of the Detroit Lions and former defensive tackle who played for eleven seasons in the NFL and has two brothers that are also involved in football, Malcolm, who serves as the running backs coach at Sacramento State, and Keenan, a defensive tackle at Southern Illinois.
