= Ray Agnew =

American football player and executive (born 1967)

Detroit Lions
- Title: Assistant general manager

Personal information
- Born: December 9, 1967 (age 58); Winston-Salem, North Carolina, U.S.
- Listed height: 6 ft 3 in (1.91 m)
- Listed weight: 285 lb (129 kg)

Career information
- Position: Defensive tackle (No. 92, 93, 99)
- High school: Carver (Winston-Salem)
- College: NC State
- NFL draft: 1990: 1st round, 10th overall pick

Career history

Playing
- New England Patriots (1990–1994); New York Giants (1995–1996); Carolina Panthers (1997)*; New York Giants (1997); St. Louis Rams (1998–2000)
- * Offseason or practice squad member only

Operations
- Los Angeles Rams (2017–2020) Director of pro personnel; Detroit Lions (2021–present) Assistant general manager

Awards and highlights
- Super Bowl champion (XXXIV); PFWA All-Rookie Team (1990); Third-team All-American (1989); 2× First-team All-ACC (1988, 1989); ACC Rookie of the Year (1986)

Career NFL statistics
- Tackles: 451
- Sacks: 22.5
- Interceptions: 2
- Stats at Pro Football Reference

Ray Mitchell Agnew Jr. (born December 9, 1967) is an American professional football executive and former player who is the assistant general manager for the Detroit Lions of the National Football League (NFL). He served as the director of pro personnel with the Los Angeles Rams from 2017 to 2020.

Agnew played college football as a defensive tackle for the NC State Wolfpack and was selected 10th overall by the New England Patriots in 1990 NFL draft. He played 11 seasons in the NFL for the Patriots, New York Giants, and St. Louis Rams.

== Early life and college ==
Agnew was born in Winston-Salem, North Carolina where he attended and played football for Carver High School. During his senior year, he was voted the defensive most valuable player after recording 70 tackles and 10 sacks in only seven games. Agnew then played college football and majored in history at North Carolina State University.

== NFL career ==
Pre-draft measurables
Height	Weight	Arm length	Hand span	Bench press
6 ft 3 in (1.91 m)	281 lb (127 kg)	31 5/8 in (0.80 m)	10 5/8 in (0.27 m)	21 reps
All values from NFL Combine

He was drafted by the New England Patriots with the tenth pick of the first round of the 1990 NFL draft. Agnew played for the Patriots for five years before going to the New York Giants. After spending three years with the Giants he went to the St. Louis Rams where he played for three years. Agnew retired after the 2000 season.

== Executive career ==
In 2017, Agnew was promoted to director of pro personnel for the Los Angeles Rams.

On January 27, 2021, Agnew was named the assistant general manager of the Detroit Lions.

== Personal life ==
Three of Agnew's sons are active in the game of football. Ray Agnew III is a pro scout for the New York Jets and is a former fullback in the National Football League. Agnew's son, Malcolm, is the current running backs coach at Sacramento State, and Keenan is a defensive tackle at Southern Illinois.
