= Donnell Woolford =

American football player (born 1966)

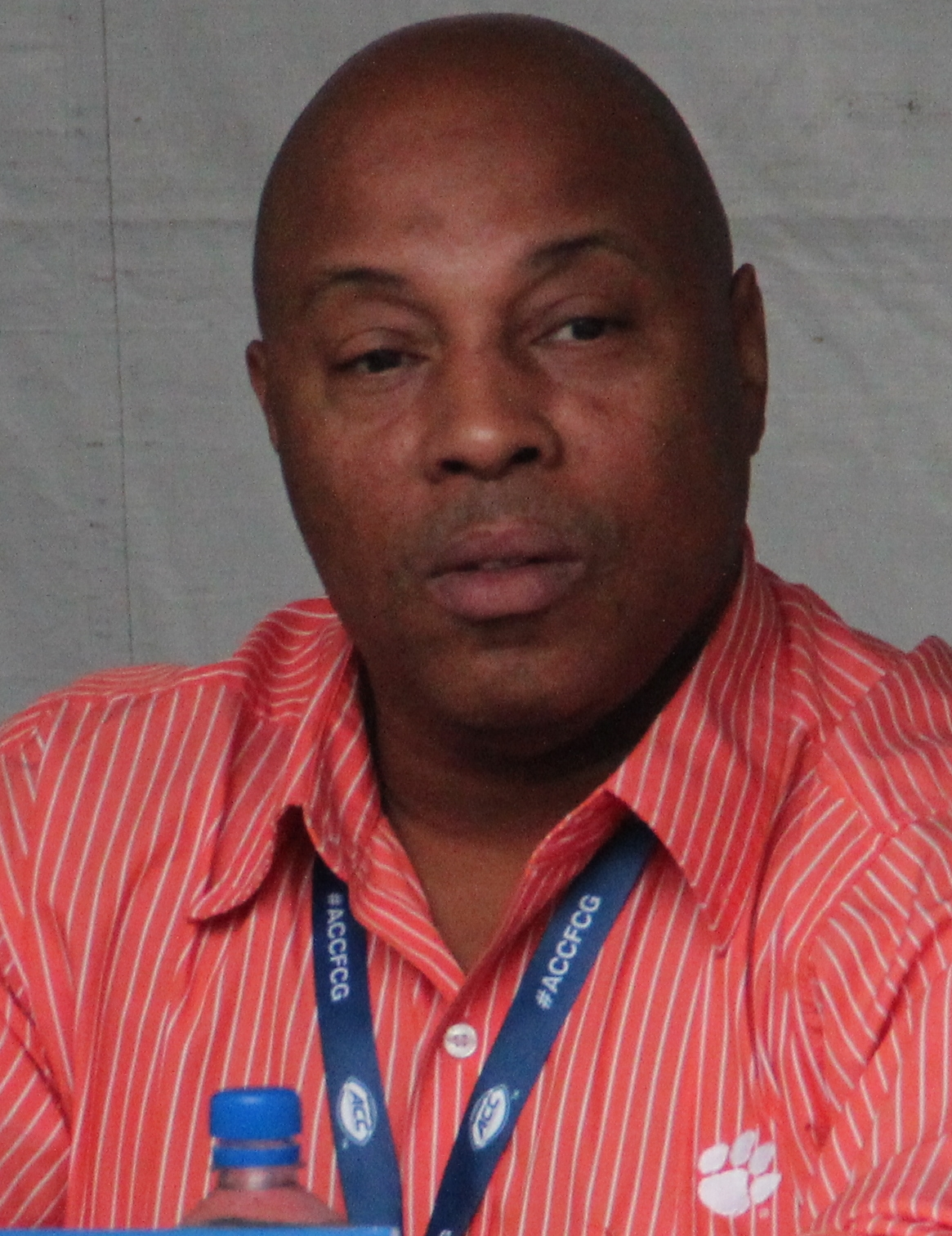
- Woolford in 2014

No. 21
- Position: Cornerback

Personal information
- Born: January 6, 1966 (age 60); Baltimore, Maryland, U.S.
- Listed height: 5 ft 9 in (1.75 m)
- Listed weight: 192 lb (87 kg)

Career information
- High school: Douglas Byrd (Fayetteville, North Carolina)
- College: Clemson
- NFL draft: 1989: 1st round, 11th overall pick

Career history
- Chicago Bears (1989–1996); Pittsburgh Steelers (1997)

Awards and highlights
- Pro Bowl (1994); 100 greatest Bears of All-Time; Consensus All-American (1988); First-team All-American (1987); 2× First-team All-ACC (1987, 1988)

Career NFL statistics
- Interceptions: 36
- Interception yards: 303
- Touchdowns: 1
- Stats at Pro Football Reference

Donnell Woolford (born January 6, 1966) is an American former professional football player who was a cornerback in the National Football League (NFL), primarily with the Chicago Bears. He was selected by the Bears in the first round (11th overall) of the 1989 NFL draft. Woolford played 10 seasons for the Bears from 1989 to 1997, the Pittsburgh Steelers from 1997 to 1998 and Carolina Panthers from 1998 to 1999. He was a Pro Bowl selection in 1994. Woolford was surpassed by Charles Tillman for the most interceptions by a Bears cornerback, although Donnell achieved the goal 18 games faster than Tillman. Woolford was a graduate of Douglas Byrd High School in Fayetteville, NC and Clemson University.

== Early life ==
Donnell Woolford was born in Baltimore, Maryland, on January 6, 1966. He attended high school in Fayetteville, North Carolina at Douglas Byrd High School, where he was a three-sport star in football, basketball, and track.

== College career ==
In 1985, Woolford first arrived at Clemson, where he had been recruited to play running back. Although he and the school initially wanted him to play running back, due to the number of running backs in camp, he decided to try a different position. Cornerback had the fewest number of players, and although he believed it to be the "hardest position to play", Woolford made the switch to cornerback.

Woolford went on to play for the Tigers from 1985 to 1988, where he was a two time All-American, earning second-team honors in 1987, and becoming a consensus All-American in 1988, and a finalist for the Jim Thorpe Award, given annually to the nation's best defensive back. He was a two time First-team All-Acc selection, recording 10 interceptions during his career. He also played punt returner, leading the ACC and finishing third nationally in 1987 with two returns for touchdowns and a 15.5 yard average per return. During his time at Clemson, the Tigers won 3 conference championships (1986, 1987, 1988) and won three bowl games (against Stanford in 1986, Penn State in 1987, and Oklahoma in 1988). Clemson finished ranked in the top 10 nationally in both 1987 and 1988.

He was later voted as one of the Greatest Clemson Tigers of the 20th Century, and inducted into the Clemson Hall of Fame.

== Professional career ==
During the 1989 NFL draft, Woolford was selected in the first round, 11th overall by the Chicago Bears. He earned Pro Bowl honors in 1994 and was a three time All Madden Team Member during his career. At one point, he had the record for most interceptions by a Chicago Bear with 32 total interceptions. This was surpassed in 2013 by Charles Tillman. Woolford started every game for Chicago from 1989 to 1996, before being traded to the Pittsburgh Steelers, where he recorded 4 more interceptions, for a career total of 36. He retired from the NFL after suffering a career ending knee injury.

== Life After Professional Football ==
Upon retirement, Woolford returned to Fayetteville where he helped coach high school football. He later coached at East Lincoln High School in Denver, North Carolina. He was co-owner of the Fayetteville Ruff Riders football team from 2004 to 2005 He was Clemson's legend representative at the 2014 ACC Championship Game. He was a graduate assistant coach with the Clemson national championship team in 2016, and was inducted into the South Carolina Hall of Fame in 2017. Woolford is now associated with an auto warranty service, and also serves as president of the Donnell Woolford Foundation, assisting the Boys & Girls Clubs of America, and the Jimmy Raye Clinic coaching local youth.

He donated land for the building of World Faith Ministries in Hope Mills, North Carolina, and continues to work in community activism as a board member on several non-profit organizations.
