= Larry Persily =

American government official (born 1951)

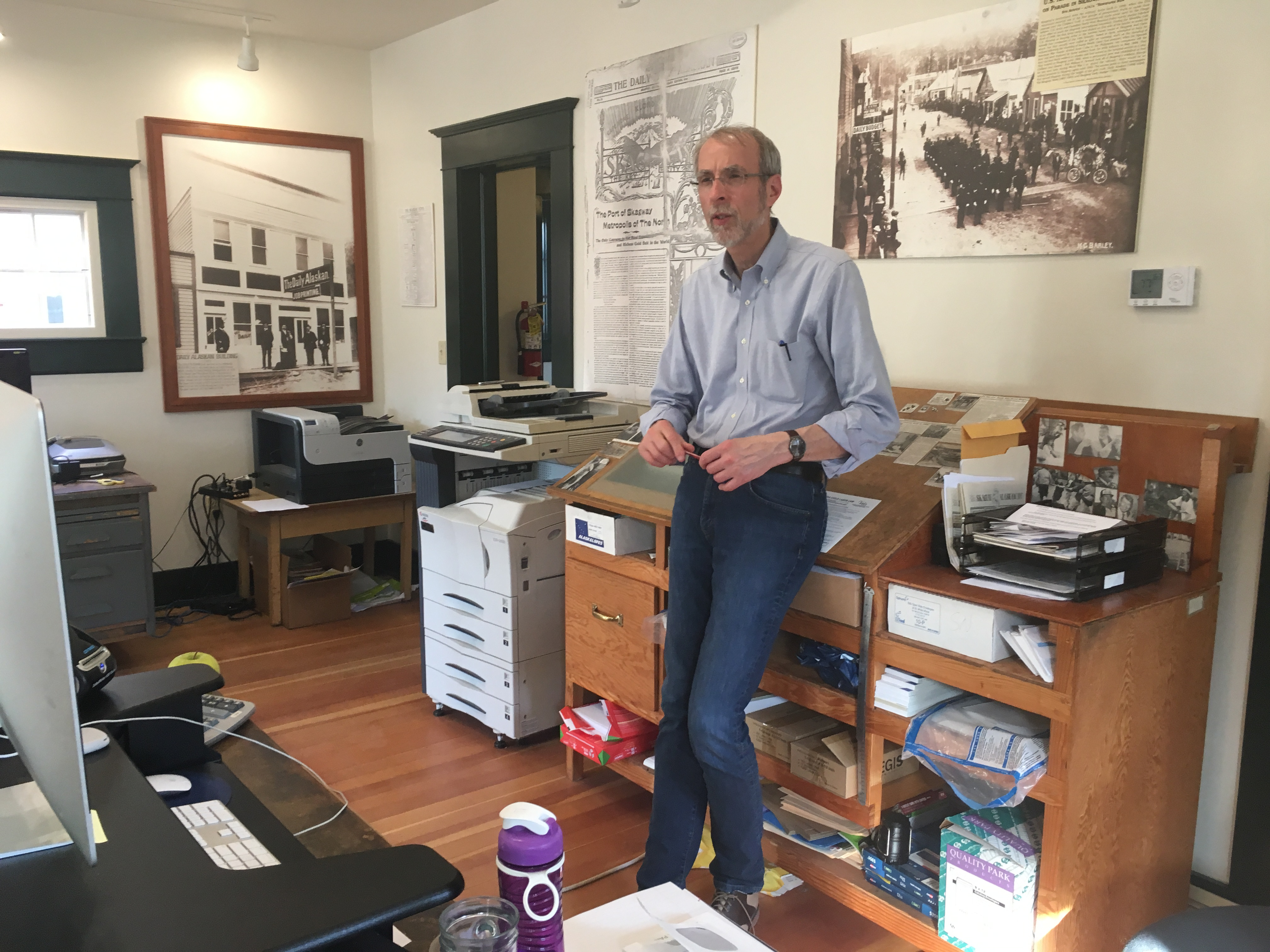
Larry Persily at Skagway News office in May 2019.

Larry Persily (born October 10, 1951) is a newspaper publisher and former Federal Coordinator of the Alaska Natural Gas Transportation Projects 2010–2015. The office was charged with coordinating federal agency responses to private-sector efforts to develop a natural gas pipeline from Alaska's North Slope to supply the North American market. The Federal Coordinator is nominated with advice and consent of the Senate by the President of the United States. He was nominated by Barack Obama on December 9, 2009, and was confirmed by the United States Senate on March 10, 2010. The office closed down in 2015 as the private companies turned their attention to a gas export project instead.

Persily graduated from Purdue University in 1972 with a BA in journalism. While at Purdue he was a senior editor during the controversial years when the Purdue Exponent student newspaper became independent of university administration control.

He moved from Chicago to Alaska in May 1976 when he and his wife, Leslie Murray, purchased the weekly newspaper in Wrangell. The couple ran the Wrangell Sentinel for about eight years before selling the newspaper and moving to Juneau. Both continued in journalism until Murray died in a car accident in 1987.

Persily continued in journalism in Alaska, working for The Anchorage Times, Anchorage Daily News, Associated Press, Juneau Empire, Petroleum News, and he started and operated a weekly newspaper in Juneau. Since 2015 he has also written a weekly Oil and Gas newsletter, which is archived at the University of Alaska Anchorage "Alaska Gas Lines" site.

He transitioned to public policy work in taxes, oil and gas and fiscal issues, working for state and municipal government, including time in the Alaska governor's Washington, D.C. office. In addition to his time with the Alaska federal office, he worked as a staffer to state House Finance Committee co-chair Mike Hawker; chief of state for state House member John Lincoln; chief of staff for the mayor of the Kenai Peninsula Borough; and CARES Act grant coordinator for the city of Kenai, Alaska.

Persily was widely quoted in national media in 2008 criticizing his former employer, then-Governor Sarah Palin, as John McCain's choice for vice president. Until June 2008, he had worked as the Washington, DC liaison for the state government of Alaska on oil and gas, tax and other issues. "She's not qualified, she doesn't have the judgment, to be next in line to the president of the United States," said Persily in August 2008.

In December 2009, Democratic senator Mark Begich recommended Persily for the Obama administration post.

Persily returned to journalism in 2019 when he purchased the newspaper in Skagway, Alaska, and then offered to give away the Skagway News instead of running it remotely from Anchorage.

His quest for the right candidate(s) to take over the newspaper stretched around the world, gathering more than 140 applicants from half a dozen countries. In early 2020 he selected two women from Alaska. The final transaction was done for $20 and Persily quipped, “"I’m selling it for 20 dollars because I figure I should at least get a pizza out of this".

In January 2021, Persily repurchased the Wrangell Sentinel newspaper, looking to rebuild it for a sustainable future. In an interview with Wrangell's radio station he said it could be done by turning over to new owners with no debt.

Sartorially, Persily is known for his taste in saddle shoes.

== See also ==
- Energy law
