= The Skagway News =

Newspaper in Alaska

Coordinates: 59.457°N 135.312°W

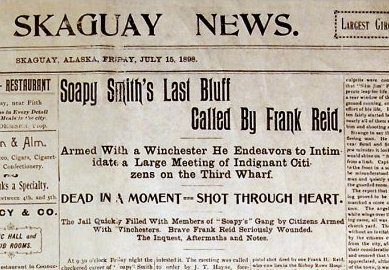
- Skaguay News July 15, 1898 Skaguay News July 15, 1898
- Type: Twice monthly newspaper
- Format: Broadsheet
- Owner(s): Tommy and Patricia Wells
- Founder: Jeff Brady
- Founded: 1978
- Language: English
- Headquarters: Skagway News Depot; 208 Broadway Street; Skagway, Alaska 99840; United States
- ISSN: 0745-872X
- OCLC number: 9526778
- Website: skagwaynews.com

The Skagway News is a newspaper published once a month in January, then twice a month for the rest of the year in Skagway, Alaska. The paper is usually available on the second and fourth Friday of the month.

== History ==
The first edition of The Skaguay News was published on October 15, 1897, in Skaguay, Alaska. It was founded by M.L. Sherpey, and written for aspiring miners moving to the area for the Klondike Gold Rush. At various times this paper was renamed to the Skaguay Weekly News and Skaguay Daily News. The spelling of the town was changed to Skagway in 1900, and the News ceased sometime in 1904.

William Jefferson "Jeff" Brady, a 21-year-old recent graduate of the University of North Carolina, moved to Skagway to revive the Skagway News in 1978. He spent the previous two summers as a bunkhouse manager and tax driver in the tourist town. Locals called Brady "Grits" due to his Southern American accent. Skagway is a ghost town throughout the year, but the paper was aimed at folks from the visiting cruise ships that dock daily during the summer months.

In 1979, Brady, who was also nicknamed "governor," merged his paper with the Haines-based Chilkat Valley News to form the Lynn Canal News. In 1981, a fire at Fort William H. Seward destroyed Brady's office and the print shop Brady contracted. Faced with moving his printing to Juneau or Whitehorse, Brady decided to unmerge both papers in 1982. At that time the bi-weekly News had a circulation of 500 while the town had a population of 800.

Brady published the News for 37 years. After a five year search, he sold the paper to Alaska Travel Publications LLP, a subsidiary of PR Services of Whitehorse. The business was owned by Jan Aalt den Hoorn and Chris Sorg. At that time the News had two employees and a circulation of 1,000.

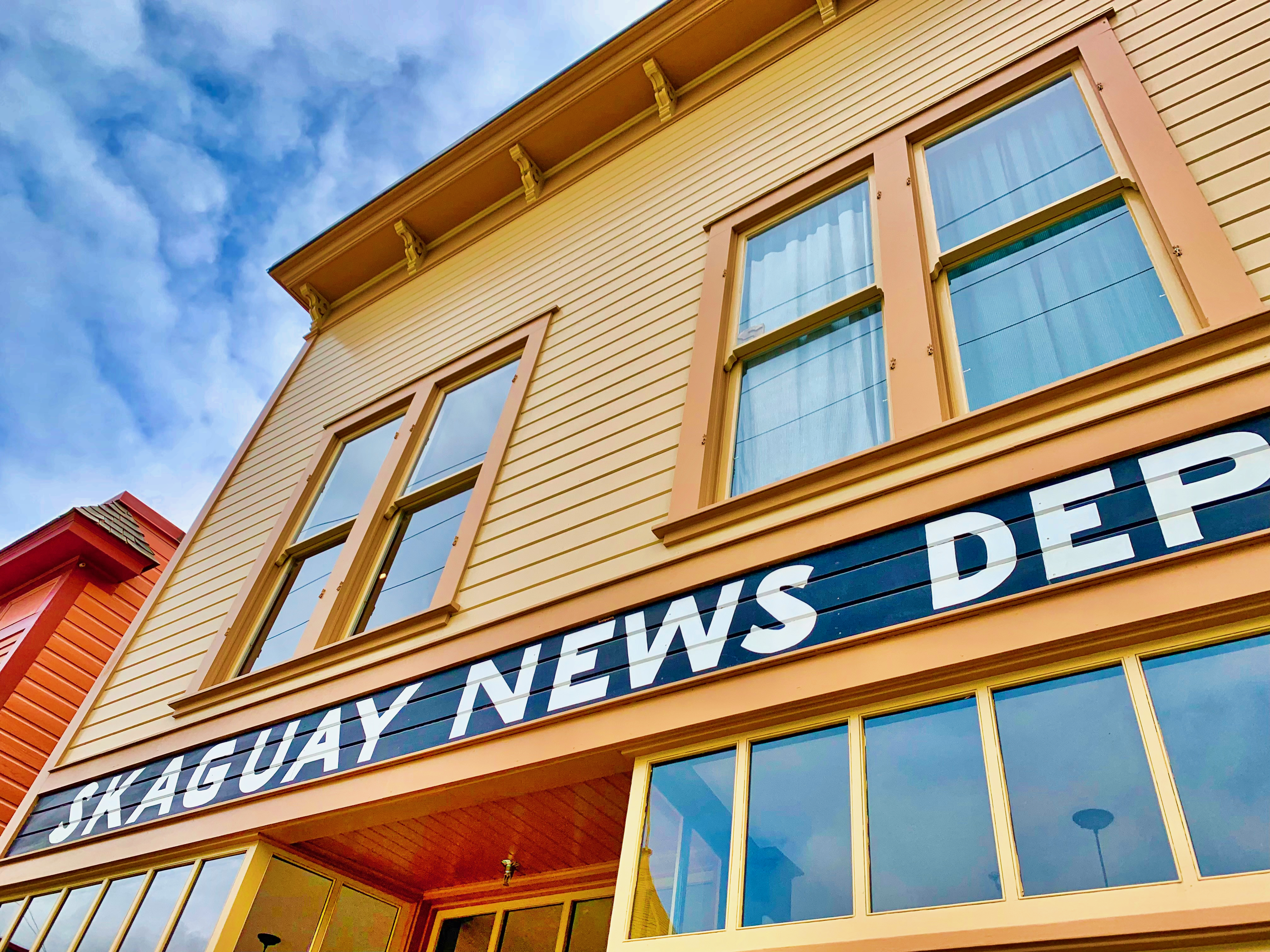
The Skagway News headquarters in Skagway, Alaska, on June 19, 2019

Larry Persily, a friend of Brady, acquired the News in April 2019. That same year, Persily sought to give the newspaper away to a new owner for free. Persily chose Melinda Munson and Gretchen Wehmhoff, two women from Chugiak, Alaska, to take over the paper. Munson and Wehmhoff took over on March 3, 2020, just days before a state of emergency due to the COVID-19 pandemic was officially declared. Munson left the paper at some point. In May 2026, Tommy and Patricia Wells, a husband-and-wife team, took over the publication from Wehmhoff.
