= Warren Powers (defensive end) =

American football player (born 1965)

No. 91, 98
- Position: Defensive end

Personal information
- Born: February 4, 1965 (age 61); Baltimore, Maryland, U.S.
- Listed height: 6 ft 6 in (1.98 m)
- Listed weight: 287 lb (130 kg)

Career information
- High school: Edmondson-Westside (Baltimore)
- College: Maryland
- NFL draft: 1989: 2nd round, 47th overall pick

Career history
- Denver Broncos (1989–1991); Los Angeles Rams (1992); Los Angeles Raiders (1994)*
- * Offseason or practice squad member only

Awards and highlights
- First-team All-ACC (1988)

Career NFL statistics
- Sacks: 9
- Fumble recoveries: 2
- Touchdowns: 1
- Stats at Pro Football Reference

Warren E. Powers (born February 4, 1965) is an American former professional football player who was a defensive end in the National Football League (NFL) for the Denver Broncos, Los Angeles Rams and Los Angeles Raiders. He was selected by the Broncos in the second round of the 1989 NFL draft with the 47th overall pick. Powers played college football for the Maryland Terrapins.

He currently heads the "One Nation" team as a National Sales Director at Primerica Financial Services.

== College career ==
Powers made All ACC in his senior year at Maryland.
