= Robert Steeples =

American football player and coach (born 1989)

Wisconsin Badgers
- Title: Cornerbacks coach

Personal information
- Born: November 27, 1989 (age 36); St. Louis, Missouri, U.S.
- Listed height: 6 ft 1 in (1.85 m)
- Listed weight: 194 lb (88 kg)

Career information
- High school: De Smet Jesuit (St. Louis, Missouri)
- College: Missouri (2009–2011); Memphis (2012)
- NFL draft: 2013: undrafted

Career history

Playing
- St. Louis Rams (2013)*; Minnesota Vikings (2013); Kansas City Chiefs (2014)*; Dallas Cowboys (2014–2015)*
- * Offseason or practice squad member only

Coaching
- De Smet Jesuit HS (MO) (2016–2020) Head coach; Minnesota Vikings (2021) Assistant special teams coach; LSU (2022–2023) Cornerbacks coach; Iowa State (2024–2025) Senior offensive analyst; Wisconsin (2026–present) Cornerbacks coach
- Stats at Pro Football Reference

Robert Steeples (born November 27, 1989) is an American football coach and former cornerback who is the cornerbacks coach for the Wisconsin Badgers of the Big Ten Conference. He played college football for the Missouri Tigers and Memphis Tigers, and played in the National Football League (NFL) for the St. Louis Rams, Minnesota Vikings, Kansas City Chiefs, and Dallas Cowboys. He served as head coach of De Smet Jesuit High School for 5 seasons, and has previously coached for the Minnesota Vikings, LSU Tigers, and Iowa State Cyclones.

== College career ==
Steeples initially started his college career playing three years for the Missouri Tigers where he totaled 40 tackles, one sack, and one interception in 37 games. Following his junior year at Missouri, he transferred to play for the Memphis Tigers, where he tallied 42 tackles and had a fumble return for a touchdown in his senior season.

== Professional career ==
=== St. Louis Rams ===
Steeples started his NFL career with the St. Louis Rams as an undrafted free agent. On August 26, 2013, Steeples was cut by the team.

=== Minnesota Vikings ===
Steeples signed with the Minnesota Vikings as a member of the practice squad on September 11, 2013, but was later added to the active roster and played in two games. He was released on August 25, 2014.

=== Kansas City Chiefs ===
On September 9, 2014, he was signed by the Kansas City Chiefs to the practice squad. He was cut on September 16.

=== Dallas Cowboys ===
On November 18, 2014, he was signed to the Dallas Cowboys' practice squad. On August 31, 2015, he was released by the Cowboys.

== Coaching career ==
Steeples bypassed playing a fourth NFL season to become the head football coach at De Smet Jesuit High School from 2016 to 2020. He was hired by the Minnesota Vikings as their assistant special teams coach on April 14, 2021. During his 5-year tenure as Head Coach, Steeples was named the 2020 All-American Bowl National Coach of the year and 2019 MFCA Coach of the year after winning the 2019 Missouri Class 6 State Championship with a record of 14–0. Prior to Steeples’ appointment of Head Coach at De Smet Jesuit, the De Smet varsity football program struggled with a record of 2–18 in 2 seasons and a national ranking of 6,224th in 2015. Under Steeples’ leadership as head coach, De Smet improved to a state championship title in 2019, reached a peak national ranking of #8, and produced 35 collegiate football student-athletes. During Steeples’ last 3 seasons as Head Coach at De Smet, the varsity football team had an overall record of 29–4; including 20 wins in a row and back to back state championship appearances in 2019 and 2020. A substantial turnaround after going 2–8 in his first season as head coach. Along with his head coaching duties, Steeples also served as Defensive Coordinator throughout his entire tenure as head coach. During his final 2 seasons as Head Coach and Defensive Coordinator, the team ranked #1 in the state allowing only 9.1 points per game. The De Smet special teams unit also produced consecutive Missouri special teams player of the year in 2019 and 2020. Steeples also served as a Teacher, Strength Coach, and Diversity & Inclusion Coordinator during his time as a faculty member.

Steeples was hired by LSU as cornerbacks coach on December 9, 2021. On January 3, 2024, Head Coach Brian Kelly announced that LSU would part ways with Steeples prior to the 2024 season.
