= 1989 All-Atlantic Coast Conference football team =

American college football all-star team

The 1989 All-Atlantic Coast Conference football team consists of American football players chosen by various selectors for their All-Atlantic Coast Conference ("ACC") teams for the 1989 college football season. Selectors in 1989 included the Associated Press (AP).

== Offensive selections ==
=== Wide receivers ===
- Clarkston Hines, Duke (AP-1)
- Ricky Proehl, Wake Forest (AP-1)
- Herman Moore, Virginia (AP-2)
- Mike Kavulic, NC State (AP-2)

=== Tackles ===
- Chris Port, Duke (AP-1)
- Stacy Long, Clemson (AP-1)
- Ray Roberts, Virginia (AP-2)
- Darryl Jenkins, Georgia Tech (AP-2)

=== Guards ===
- Pat Crowley, North Carolina (AP-1)
- Roy Brown, Virginia (AP-1)
- Jeb Flesch, Clemson (AP-2)
- Rick Pokrant, NC State (AP-2)

=== Centers ===
- Carey Metts, Duke (AP-1)
- Tony Mayberry, Wake Forest (AP-2)

=== Tight ends ===
- Bruce McGonnigal, Virginia (AP-1)
- Dave Colonna, Duke (AP-2)

=== Quarterbacks ===
- Shawn Moore, Virginia (AP-1)
- Shane Montgomery, NC State (AP-2)

=== Running backs ===
- Randy Cuthbert, Duke (AP-1)
- Jerry Mays, Georgia Tech (AP-1)
- Marcus Wilson, Virginia (AP-2)
- Terry Allen, Clemson (AP-2)

== Defensive selections ==
=== Defensive linemen ===
- Ray Agnew, NC State (AP-1)
- Vance Hammond, Clemson (AP-1)
- Cecil Gray, North Carolina (AP-1)
- Willie Burks, Georgia Tech (AP-2)
- Otis Moore, Clemson (AP-2)
- Larry Webster, Maryland (AP-2)

=== Linebackers ===
- Doug Brewster, Clemson (AP-1)
- Eric Thomas, Georgia Tech (AP-1)
- Ray Savage, Virginia (AP-1)
- Bobby Houston, NC State (AP-1)
- Dwight Hollier, North Carolina (AP-2)
- Phil Thomas, Virginia (AP-2)
- Levon Kirkland, Clemson (AP-2)
- John Johnson, Clemson (AP-2)

=== Defensive backs ===
- Jesse Campbell, NC State (AP-1)
- Ken Swilling, Georgia Tech (AP-1)
- James Lott, Clemson (AP-1)
- Robert O'Neal, Clemson (AP-1)
- Tony Covington, Virginia (AP-2)
- Erwin Sampson, Duke (AP-2)
- Fernandus Vinson, NC State (AP-2)
- Dexter Davis, Clemson (AP-2)

== Special teams ==
=== Placekickers ===
- Chris Gardocki, Clemson (AP-1)
- Jake McInerney, Virginia (AP-2)

=== Punters ===
- Chris Gardocki, Clemson (AP-1)
- Scott McAllister, North Carolina (AP-2)

== Key ==
AP = Associated Press

== See also ==
1989 College Football All-America Team
