= KeVonn Mabon =

American football player (born 1993)

Profile
- Position: Wide receiver

Personal information
- Born: October 2, 1993 (age 33); Gary, Indiana, U.S.
- Listed height: 6 ft 3 in (1.91 m)
- Listed weight: 207 lb (94 kg)

Career information
- High school: Creve Coeur (MO) De Smet Jesuit
- College: Ball State
- NFL draft: 2017: undrafted

Career history
- Tennessee Titans (2017)*; Indianapolis Colts (2017)*
- * Offseason or practice squad member only

Awards and highlights
- Second-team All-MAC (2016)
- Stats at Pro Football Reference

KeVonn Mabon (born October 2, 1993) is an American former football wide receiver. He played college football at Ball State.

== Professional career ==
=== Tennessee Titans ===
Mabon signed with the Tennessee Titans as an undrafted free agent on May 11, 2017. He was waived by the Titans on September 2, 2017.

=== Indianapolis Colts ===
On November 9, 2017, Mabon was signed to the Indianapolis Colts' practice squad. He was released on November 13, 2017.

Mabon later spent time with the Dresden Monarchs.
