= Jesse Campbell (American football) =

American football player (born 1969)

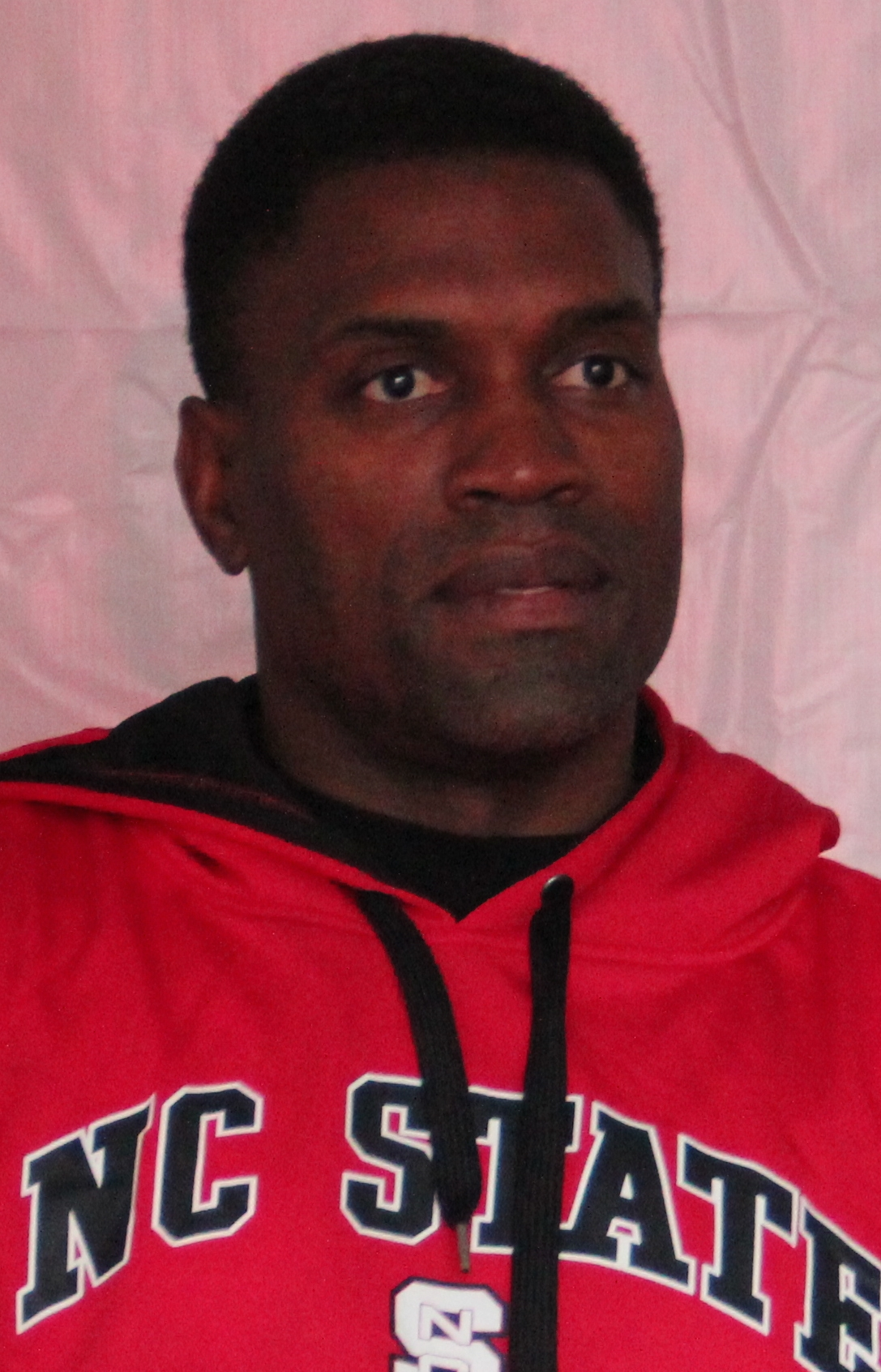

No. 37
- Position: Safety

Personal information
- Born: April 11, 1969 (age 57); Washington, D.C.
- Listed height: 6 ft 1 in (1.85 m)
- Listed weight: 211 lb (96 kg)

Career information
- High school: West Craven (Vanceboro, North Carolina)
- College: NC State
- NFL draft: 1991: 2nd round, 48th overall pick

Career history
- Philadelphia Eagles (1991–1992)*; New York Giants (1992–1996); Washington Redskins (1997–1998)
- * Offseason or practice squad member only

Awards and highlights
- Second-team All-American (1990); 3× First-team All-ACC (1988, 1989, 1990)

Career NFL statistics
- Tackles: 404
- Interceptions: 7
- Fumble recoveries: 6
- Stats at Pro Football Reference

Jesse Gilbert Campbell Jr. (born April 11, 1969) is an American former professional football player who was a safety in the National Football League (NFL) for the Washington Redskins, Philadelphia Eagles, and the New York Giants. He played college football for the NC State Wolfpack and was selected by the Eagles in the second round of the 1991 NFL draft. He was a high school football coach for Gulfport High School in Gulfport, Mississippi. He is now an assistant principal at New Bern High School in New Bern, North Carolina, just south of his home town.
