= Chris Port =

American football player (born 1967)

No. 70
- Position: Offensive lineman

Personal information
- Born: November 2, 1967 (age 59); Wanaque, New Jersey, U.S.
- Listed height: 6 ft 5 in (1.96 m)
- Listed weight: 295 lb (134 kg)

Career information
- High school: Don Bosco Prep (Ramsey, New Jersey)
- College: Duke
- NFL draft: 1990: 12th round, 320th overall pick

Career history
- New Orleans Saints (1990–1995)

Awards and highlights
- First-team All-American (1989); 2× First-team All-ACC (1988, 1989)

Career NFL statistics
- Games played: 69
- Games started: 50
- Fumble recoveries: 2
- Stats at Pro Football Reference

Christopher Charles Port (born November 2, 1967) is an American former professional football player who was an offensive lineman for five seasons for the New Orleans Saints in the National Football League (NFL). He played college football for the Duke Blue Devils and was selected in the 12th round (320th overall) of the 1990 NFL draft.

Born and raised in Wanaque, New Jersey, Port played football at Don Bosco Preparatory High School.

== Career ==
=== High school ===
In his senior season of 1985–86 Port was selected as a first-team, All-league, All County, All State and All American selection. Port was a three-year starter for the Ironmen and helped lead the team to a state championship in 1984 and playoff berths all three years as a starter. Port was awarded the Ironman award his senior year.

=== College ===
Port played a prominent role in the resurgence of Duke football under head coach Steve Spurrier in the late 1980s. He earned the 1989 Jacobs Blocking Trophy, which is awarded to the ACC's top blocker, after his stellar offensive line play helped the Blue Devils to an 8–4 overall record, the ACC co-championship and a berth in the All-American Bowl. The two-time All-ACC first-team selection was a first-team All-America recipient by the Football Writers Association of America for his standout work on a Duke offense that averaged 31.4 points per game. Port was selected as a member of the ACC Class of Legends in 2019.

=== Professional ===
Port spent six seasons with the New Orleans Saints after being selected in the 12th round of the 1990 NFL Draft. He helped the Saints to three playoff berths and a 53–43 regular-season record during his tenure.
