= Trent Frederic =

American ice hockey player (born 1998)

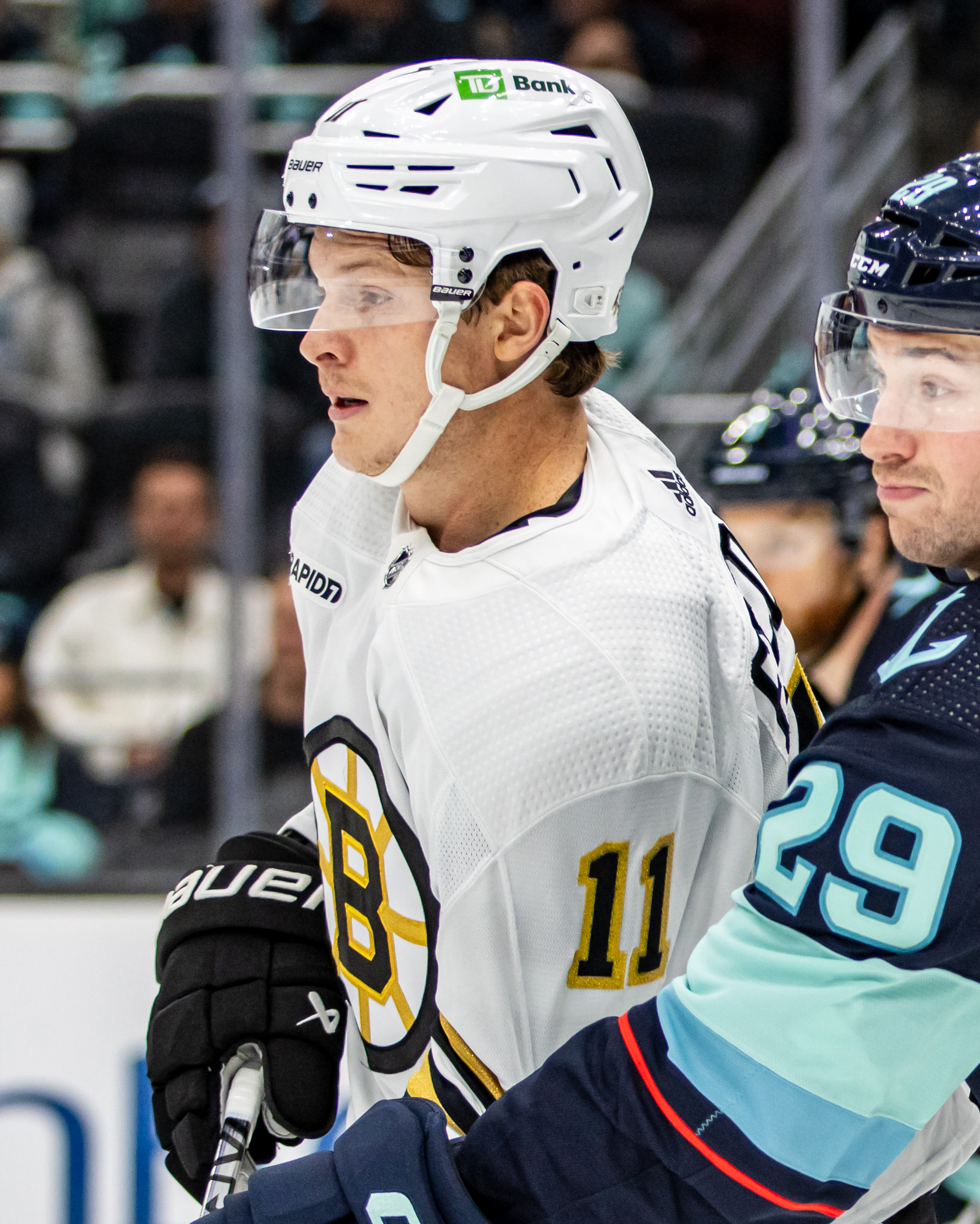
- Frederic with the Boston Bruins in 2024
- Born: February 11, 1998 (age 28) St. Louis, Missouri, U.S.
- Height: 6 ft 3 in (191 cm)
- Weight: 218 lb (99 kg; 15 st 8 lb)
- Position: Forward
- Shoots: Left
- NHL team Former teams: Edmonton Oilers; Boston Bruins
- NHL draft: 29th overall, 2016; Boston Bruins
- Playing career: 2018–present

Trent Frederic (born February 11, 1998) is an American professional ice hockey player who is a forward for the Edmonton Oilers of the National Hockey League (NHL). He previously played for the Boston Bruins of the NHL. The Bruins selected Frederic in the first round, 29th overall, of the 2016 NHL entry draft.

Born and raised in St. Louis, Missouri, Frederic's childhood hockey coaches included former St. Louis Blues players Keith Tkachuk and David Backes. He was recruited out of De Smet Jesuit High School by the USA Hockey National Team Development Program in 2013, and in two years with USA Hockey, he appeared in several United States Hockey League and international tournaments. From there, he spent two seasons with the Wisconsin Badgers, serving as an alternate captain during the 2017–18 season.

Joining the Bruins for the 2018–19 season, Frederic struggled to adjust under head coach Bruce Cassidy in the NHL. He struggled to receive regular playing time through the 2020–21 season, which culminated in a severe illness that sidelined an otherwise strong season. When Jim Montgomery replaced Cassidy in 2022, Frederic's confidence increased and he took on a larger role on the Bruins roster.

== Early life ==
Frederic was born on February 11, 1998, in St. Louis, Missouri, to Bob and Gaye Frederic, both lifelong fans of the St. Louis Blues of the National Hockey League (NHL). Raised a Blues fan, Frederic's favorite hockey players as a child were Keith Tkachuk and David Backes, and as he began playing hockey himself, he would model his playing style after that of Backes. Tkachuk's sons Brady and Matthew would practice roller hockey in Frederic's childhood basement, sometimes joined by Logan Brown, Clayton Keller, and Luke Kunin.

He played three sports throughout his childhood, all of which were coached by former professionals: Frederic's hockey coaches were Tkachuk and Jeff Brown, the quarterback coach on his American football team was Gus Frerotte, and Mike Matheny coached him in Little League Baseball. Frederic spent two years as a three-sport athlete for De Smet Jesuit High School before October 2013, when the USA Hockey National Team Development Program noticed him at a minor ice hockey tournament and recruited him for their program. He spent two years in the development program, scoring seven goals and 12 assists for a total of 19 points in 58 United States Hockey League games.

== Playing career ==
=== NCAA ===
On April 18, 2014, Frederic committed to play college ice hockey for the Wisconsin Badgers beginning in the 2016–17 season. The summer before joining the Badgers, Frederic, who had previously been recruited by the Boston University Terriers, was selected by the Boston Bruins in the first round, 29th overall, of the 2016 NHL entry draft. Despite being drafted, Frederic committed to Wisconsin, and he scored his first collegiate goal on October 8, 2016, as part of a 6–5 defeat of the Northern Michigan Wildcats. With six points in his first four games, including a four-point game against the Boston College Eagles, Frederic was named the Big Ten Conference's Second Star of the Week for the week ending October 18. After breaking his hand in practice on November 17, the Badgers' goals per game dropped from 3.75 in the eight games he had played to 2.67 in the six games he missed. Centering a line with Cameron Hughes and Luke Kunin, Frederic was second to Kunin with 15 goals and 33 points in 30 regular season games. Although the Badgers lost the Big Ten tournament to Penn State in double overtime, thus keeping them out of the NCAA tournament, Frederic was named the Big Ten Men's Ice Hockey Freshman of the Year, as well as the recipient of the Spike Carlson–Chris Chelios Award for the Badgers' most valuable player (MVP). He was also named to both the All-Big Ten Second Team and Freshman Team.

When Hughes was promoted to Badgers captain shortly before the 2017–18 season, Frederic became one of four alternate captains. He struggled in the first half of the regular season, dropping from 1.1 points per game during his freshman year to 0.76 as a sophomore, in part because his opponents were targeting him. In an effort to remedy this, coach Tony Granato dropped Frederic from the first to the third offensive line, where he centered Matthew Freytag and Sean Dhooghe. On February 7, after back-to-back three-point outings against the Michigan Wolverines, Frederic was named the Big Ten second star of the week. Although Frederic delivered two goals in the Big Ten tournament game, the Badgers lost to Michigan 7–4 and were kept once again from the NCAA tournament. Frederic had 17 goals and 32 points in 36 regular season games for the Badgers that year and was named an All-Big Ten honorable mention, but had two four-game scoring droughts as Wisconsin finished the season 14–19–4. After the 2017–18 season ended, Frederic signed a three-year, entry-level contract with the Bruins, ending his college hockey career.

=== Professional ===
==== Boston Bruins (2018–2025) ====
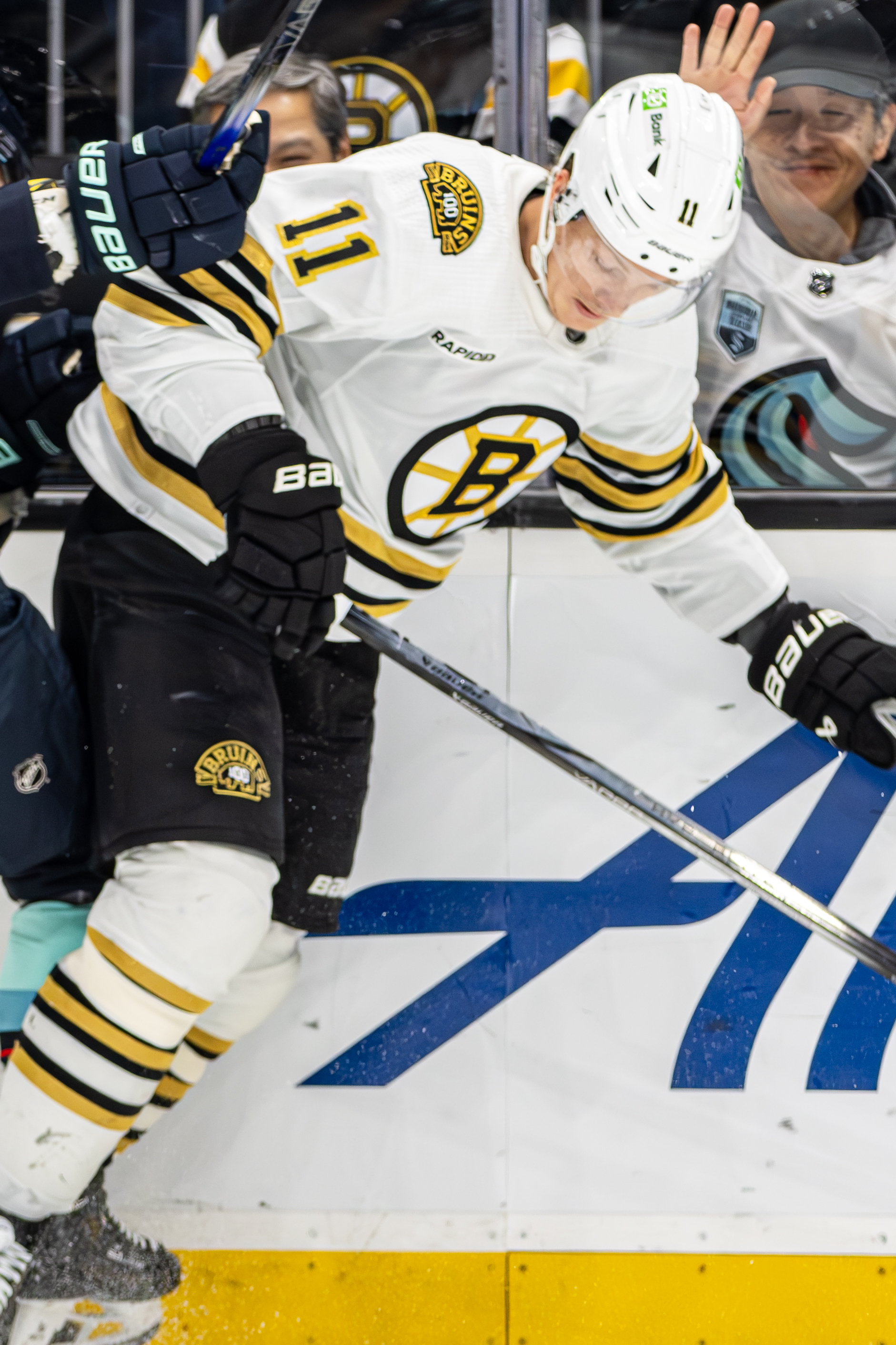
Frederic with the Bruins in 2024

Frederic's contract with the Bruins started during the 2018–19 season, but he was able to finish out the 2017–18 season with the Providence Bruins, Boston's American Hockey League (AHL) affiliate, on an amateur tryout contract. He played in 13 regular season games for Providence, recording five goals and eight points in the process, and contributed an additional assist in three postseason games.

The off-deason departure of Riley Nash to the Columbus Blue Jackets left the Bruins' third-line center position open for the 2018–19 season, and Frederic entered training camp in contention with Jack Studnicka and Jakob Forsbacka Karlsson for the role. Veterans David Backes and Sean Kuraly were ultimately awarded the job, while Frederic and his competitors were sent back to Providence. Ultimately, however, the third-line center became a rotating position, and Frederic was called up from Providence on January 29 to try out the role. He made his NHL debut that night, skating alongside his childhood hero Backes, and received a five-minute major penalty for fighting with Winnipeg Jets forward Brandon Tanev. After 11 scoreless games for Boston, Frederic was sent back down to Providence on February 22, shortly before the trading deadline, in order to clear salary cap space for new acquisition Charlie Coyle. Ultimately, Frederic played in 15 NHL games during the 2018–19 season, with no goals or assists in any of them, but had 14 goals and 25 points in 55 games with Providence.

Although he began the 2019–20 season in Providence, injuries soon decimated the Bruins' offensive core, and Frederic was called up to Boston on November 14 to replace an injured Zach Senyshyn. He skated on the third line with Par Lindholm and Danton Heinen, playing on the left wing instead of his usual center. His call-up was short-lived, as Frederic, Paul Carey, and Urho Vaakanainen were all sent down to Providence on November 18 to make room for Jake DeBrusk, Patrice Bergeron, and Brett Ritchie, all of whom were returning from their respective injuries. Although he played in only two NHL games that season, Frederic made a much larger impact in the AHL, where he scored eight goals and 32 points in 59 regular season games, all while leading the league with 148 penalty minutes. By the time that the AHL season was canceled in March due to the COVID-19 pandemic, the Providence Bruins were on a 12-game winning streak and were poised to take the No. 1 seed in the Eastern Conference. When the NHL returned to play for the 2020 Stanley Cup playoffs, Frederic was one of 31 players selected to join the team in the Toronto "bubble". He contracted the COVID-19 virus during the pre-playoff training camp, however, and could not play with the team during their postseason run.

Frederic opened the 2020–21 season as a member of the Bruins' taxi squad, ready to fill in for either Craig Smith or Brad Marchand as needed. After cementing his place on the Bruins lineup by way of fighting with P. K. Subban of the New Jersey Devils early in the season, Frederic finally picked up his first NHL point on January 23, an assist on Coyle's goal in a 3–1 defeat of the Philadelphia Flyers. His first NHL goal also came against the Flyers, a second-period shot past Carter Hart during the NHL Outdoors at Lake Tahoe game on February 21. What was poised to be a strong rookie season for Frederic was suddenly derailed after April 6, when he contracted a mysterious, non-COVID-19 illness. Frederic suffered a fever of over 100 °F (38 °C) that sidelined him for some time, and when the Bruins acquired Curtis Lazar and Taylor Hall in a late-season trade with the Buffalo Sabres, it was difficult for Frederic to find his way back into the lineup. After contracting the illness, he made only six more regular season appearances for Boston. He scored four goals and one assist in 42 regular season games, but did not make an appearance in any of the Bruins' 11 games at the 2021 Stanley Cup playoffs, even when the fourth line wavered and Boston eventually fell to the New York Islanders.

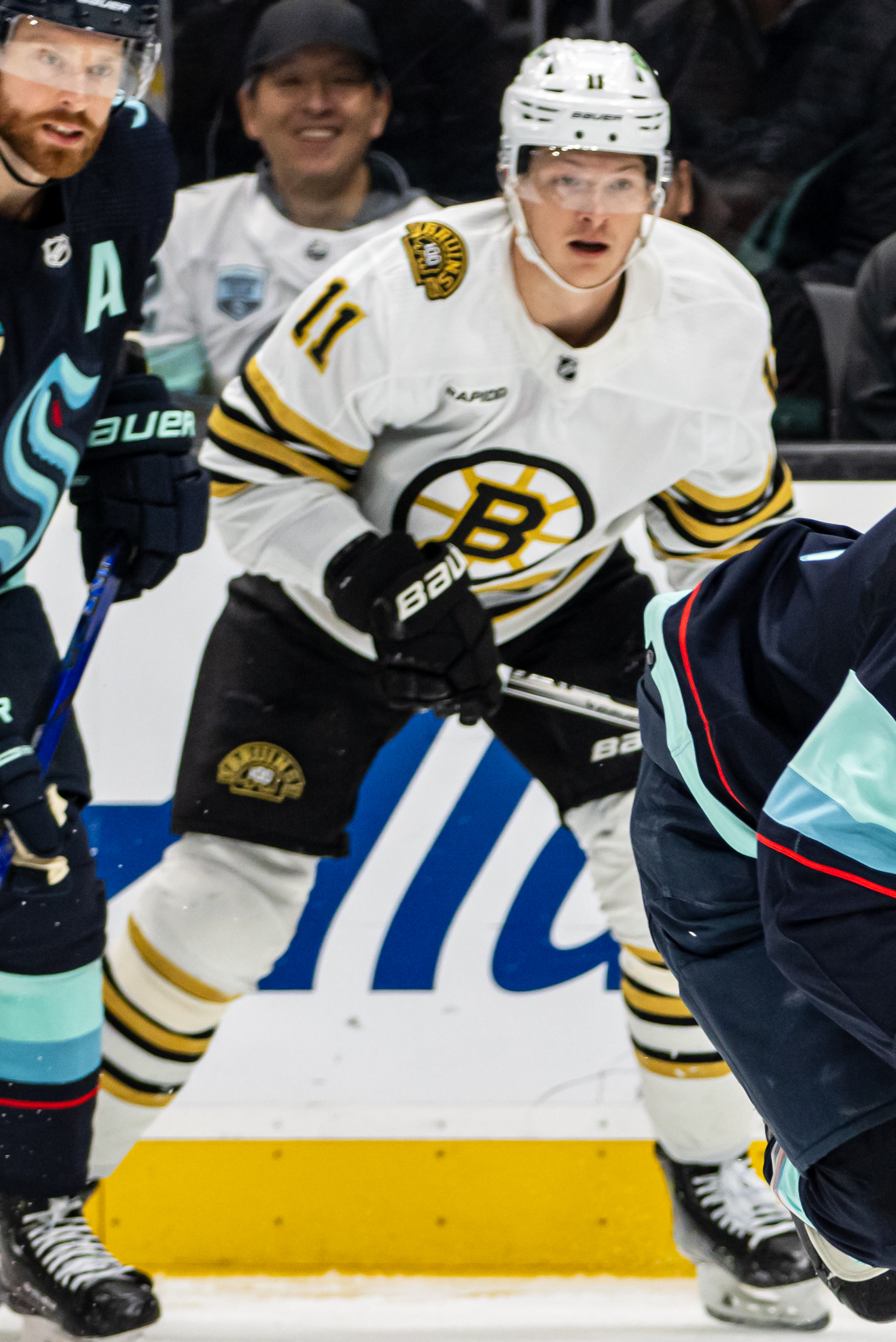
Frederic with the Bruins in 2024

An impending restricted free agent after the 2020–21 season, Frederic signed a two-year, $2.1 million contract extension with the Bruins on June 25, 2021. Shortly thereafter, he was one of the seven forwards that the Bruins chose to protect in the 2021 NHL expansion draft. He began the 2021–22 season on an inexperienced fourth line with Tomáš Nosek and Karson Kuhlman, where he was expected to maintain possession of the puck against opposing defense. On November 9, Frederic left the Bruins' game against the Ottawa Senators after taking a hit from Josh Brown. He missed two weeks with a concussion, and upon his return to the lineup on November 28, Frederic was promoted to a third line with Nick Foligno and Kuhlman. In December, Frederic was one of nine Bruins players to enter COVID-19 protocols before the NHL ordered an eight-day team shutdown. Frederic suffered another upper-body injury after the break, this time in Boston's January 10 game against the Washington Capitals. He returned to the lineup on February 8, after the NHL All-Star Game break. In the second half of the season, Frederic took a less physical approach to avoid taking penalties, and he found chemistry on a line with center Charlie Coyle. Playing in 60 regular season games as a bottom-six center and left wing, Frederic recorded eight goals and 18 points, and outgoing head coach Bruce Cassidy criticized his discipline and offensive initiative. The Bruins faced the Carolina Hurricanes in the first round of the 2022 Stanley Cup playoffs. Frederic struggled in the postseason: he missed three games after taking a penalty in Game 2, and in Game 7, a defensive miscue on his part allowed Max Domi of the Hurricanes to score, ultimately ending the Bruins' season.

Leading into the 2022–23 season, Frederic practiced shooting and skating at his family home, and he met with a mental toughness coach. After a poor preseason in which Frederic believed he was too concerned with making mistakes, incoming coach Jim Montgomery told him to "hunt and hit". This simplified approach helped Frederic's confidence and gave him "a better sense of" when to initiate fights. A natural center, his confidence and performance also improved with a move to right wing, with Coyle centering a line that also included Taylor Hall. By the end of December, the Bruins coaching staff used Frederic in all three offensive roles depending on roster injuries, but Montgomery viewed him as most creative on the right wing. Playing in 79 games, mostly with Hall and Coyle, Frederic finished the regular season with a career-high 17 goals and 31 points. That momentum failed to carry over into the 2023 Stanley Cup playoffs, in which the Bruins lost a seven-game first-round series to the Florida Panthers. Frederic was scratched for two games in favor of rookie Jakub Lauko, and he was held off the board in the five games he did play.

A restricted free agent after the 2022–23 season, Frederic signed a two-year, $4.6 million contract extension with the Bruins on August 1, 2023. With several members of the Bruins' core departing before the season, Frederic had the opportunity to take a greater role on the 2023–24 team. As the season progressed, Frederic's speed developed, which allowed him to take a more dynamic role on offense. On January 6, Frederic, filling in for an injured James van Riemsdyk, scored the first power play goal of his professional career against the Tampa Bay Lightning. Appearing in all but one regular season game for Boston, Frederic set career highs with 18 goals and 40 points, and he received the NESN 7th Player Award as the Bruin who exceeded fan expectations that season. Frederic attributed his growth over the past two seasons to Montgomery, who "[gave] me confidence and let me play and learn from some of my mistakes".

==== Edmonton Oilers (2025–present) ====
On March 4, 2025, Frederic was traded to the Edmonton Oilers alongside Max Jones and unsigned prospect Petr Hauser in a three-team deal, which saw the Bruins receive Max Wanner, a second-round draft pick, and a fourth-round pick, while the New Jersey Devils received prospect Shane Lachance for retaining half of Frederic's salary. Frederic played his first game for the Oilers on April 5, 2025, against the Los Angeles Kings in a 3–0 losing effort. Frederic scored his first goal as an Oiler on May 1, 2025, in Game 6 of the Oilers first round matchup against the Kings. It would turn out to be the series winning goal, as the Oilers won 6–4 and advanced to the second round.

On June 27, 2025, Frederic signed an eight-year, $30.8 million contract extension with the Oilers.

== International play ==
Medal record

Men's ice hockey

Representing the United States

World Junior Championships
Bronze medal – third place	2018 United States	

IIHF World U18 Championship
Bronze medal – third place	2016 United States	

World U-17 Hockey Challenge
Silver medal – second place	2014 Ontario	

Frederic's tenure with the National Team Development Program allowed him to represent the United States at a number of international tournaments, beginning with the 2014 World Under-17 Hockey Challenge, where he recorded one goal and one assist in six games of Team USA's silver-medal finish. The following year, Frederic helped the United States to a bronze medal with four goals and three assists in the 2016 IIHF World U18 Championships, including a hat-trick in the team's 12–1 opening-round rout of Latvia. Two years later, he won another bronze medal, this time contributing five goals in seven games for the United States junior team at the 2018 World Junior Ice Hockey Championships. Four of these goals came in the bronze medal game, where the US team defeated the Czech Republic 9–3.

== Fighting ==
Standing at 6 feet 3 inches (1.91 m) and weighing 220 pounds (100 kg), Frederic has become a successful fighter in his NHL career. His penchant for fighting began as a child, when he and his brother Grant would practice hitting each other in a makeshift basement roller rink. Most of his fights have come from a self-professed desire to help his teammates, such as when he battled Tommy Cross of the Springfield Thunderbirds after Cross elbowed Cameron Hughes in the head. Boston coach Bruce Cassidy has praised Frederic's discipline and control in picking his battles and has encouraged him to become an enforcer. Cassidy and teammate Brad Marchand, himself a notorious pest, have also praised Frederic's ability to draw penalties from his opponents by agitating them into a fight or another infraction.

== Personal life ==
Frederic's older brother Grant is also a hockey player, and the two would often face each other while Trent played with the US national team and Grant was with the Green Bay Gamblers. Grant spent four years playing college ice hockey for the Miami RedHawks before signing with the Adirondack Thunder of the ECHL in 2020.

== Career statistics ==
=== Regular season and playoffs ===
			Regular season					Playoffs
Season	Team	League	GP	G	A	Pts	PIM	GP	G	A	Pts	PIM
2013–14	St. Louis AAA Blues U16	T1EHL	37	11	19	30	30	—	—	—	—	—
2014–15	U.S. NTDP Juniors	USHL	35	3	2	5	30	—	—	—	—	—
2014–15	U.S. NTDP U17	USDP	55	5	9	14	42	—	—	—	—	—
2015–16	U.S. NTDP Juniors	USHL	23	4	10	14	23	—	—	—	—	—
2015–16	U.S. NTDP U18	USDP	61	20	20	40	73	—	—	—	—	—
2016–17	University of Wisconsin	B1G	30	15	18	33	32	—	—	—	—	—
2017–18	University of Wisconsin	B1G	36	17	15	32	26	—	—	—	—	—
2017–18	Providence Bruins	AHL	13	5	3	8	11	3	0	1	1	0
2018–19	Providence Bruins	AHL	55	14	11	25	67	4	0	2	2	2
2018–19	Boston Bruins	NHL	15	0	0	0	15	—	—	—	—	—
2019–20	Providence Bruins	AHL	59	8	24	32	148	—	—	—	—	—
2019–20	Boston Bruins	NHL	2	0	0	0	0	—	—	—	—	—
2020–21	Boston Bruins	NHL	42	4	1	5	65	—	—	—	—	—
2021–22	Boston Bruins	NHL	60	8	10	18	57	4	0	0	0	16
2022–23	Boston Bruins	NHL	79	17	14	31	57	5	0	0	0	10
2023–24	Boston Bruins	NHL	82	18	22	40	69	13	3	2	5	20
2024–25	Boston Bruins	NHL	57	8	7	15	44	—	—	—	—	—
2024–25	Edmonton Oilers	NHL	1	0	0	0	0	22	1	3	4	25
2025–26	Edmonton Oilers	NHL	74	4	3	7	60	4	0	0	0	0
NHL totals			412	58	57	116	367	48	4	5	9	71

=== International ===
Year	Team	Event	Result	GP	G	A	Pts	PIM
2014	United States	U17	2nd place, silver medalist(s)	6	1	0	1	4
2016	United States	WJC18	3rd place, bronze medalist(s)	7	4	3	7	4
2018	United States	WJC	3rd place, bronze medalist(s)	7	5	0	5	2
Junior totals				20	10	3	13	10

== Awards and honors ==
Award	Year	Ref.
College
Big Ten Freshman of the Year	2017	
All-Big Ten Freshman Team	2017	
All-Big Ten Second Team	2017	
Spike Carlson–Chris Chelios Award (Badgers MVP)	2017	
All-Big Ten honorable mention	2018	
Boston Bruins
Seventh Player Award	2024	

Awards and achievements
Preceded by Charlie McAvoy	Boston Bruins first-round draft pick 2016	Succeeded by Urho Vaakanainen
Preceded by Kyle Connor	Big Ten Freshman of the Year; 2016–17	Succeeded by Mitchell Lewandowski
