= 1987 All-Atlantic Coast Conference football team =

American college football all-star team

The 1987 All-Atlantic Coast Conference football team consists of American football players chosen by various selectors for their All-Atlantic Coast Conference ("ACC") teams for the 1987 college football season. Selectors in 1987 included the Associated Press (AP).

== Offensive selections ==
=== Wide receivers ===
- John Ford, Virginia (AP)
- Clarkston Hines, Duke (AP)

=== Tackles ===
- Jeff Nunamacher, Clemson (AP)
- Chris Minear, Virginia (AP)

=== Guards ===
- John Phillips, Clemson (AP)
- Pat Crowley, North Carolina (AP)

=== Centers ===
- Chuck Massaro, NC State (AP)

=== Tight ends ===
- Ferrell Edmunds, Maryland (AP)

=== Quarterbacks ===
- Scott Secules, Virginia (AP)

=== Running backs ===
- Terry Allen, Clemson (AP)
- Mark Young, Wake Forest (AP)

== Defensive selections ==
=== Defensive linemen ===
- Michael Dean Perry, Clemson (AP)
- Carlton Bailey, North Carolina (AP)
- Tim Goad, North Carolina (AP)
- Sean Scott, Virginia (AP)
- Tony Stephens, Clemson (AP)

=== Linebackers ===
- Kevin Walker, Maryland (AP)
- Jimmie Simmons, Wake Forest (AP)

=== Defensive backs ===
- Norris Davis, North Carolina (AP)
- Donnell Woolford, Clemson (AP)
- A.J. Greene, Wake Forest (AP)
- Kevin Cook, Virginia (AP)

== Special teams ==
=== Placekickers ===
- David Treadwell, Clemson (AP)

=== Punters ===
- Craig Salmon, Maryland (AP)

== Key ==
AP = Associated Press

== See also ==
1987 College Football All-America Team
