= Chris Hairston =

American football player (born 1989)

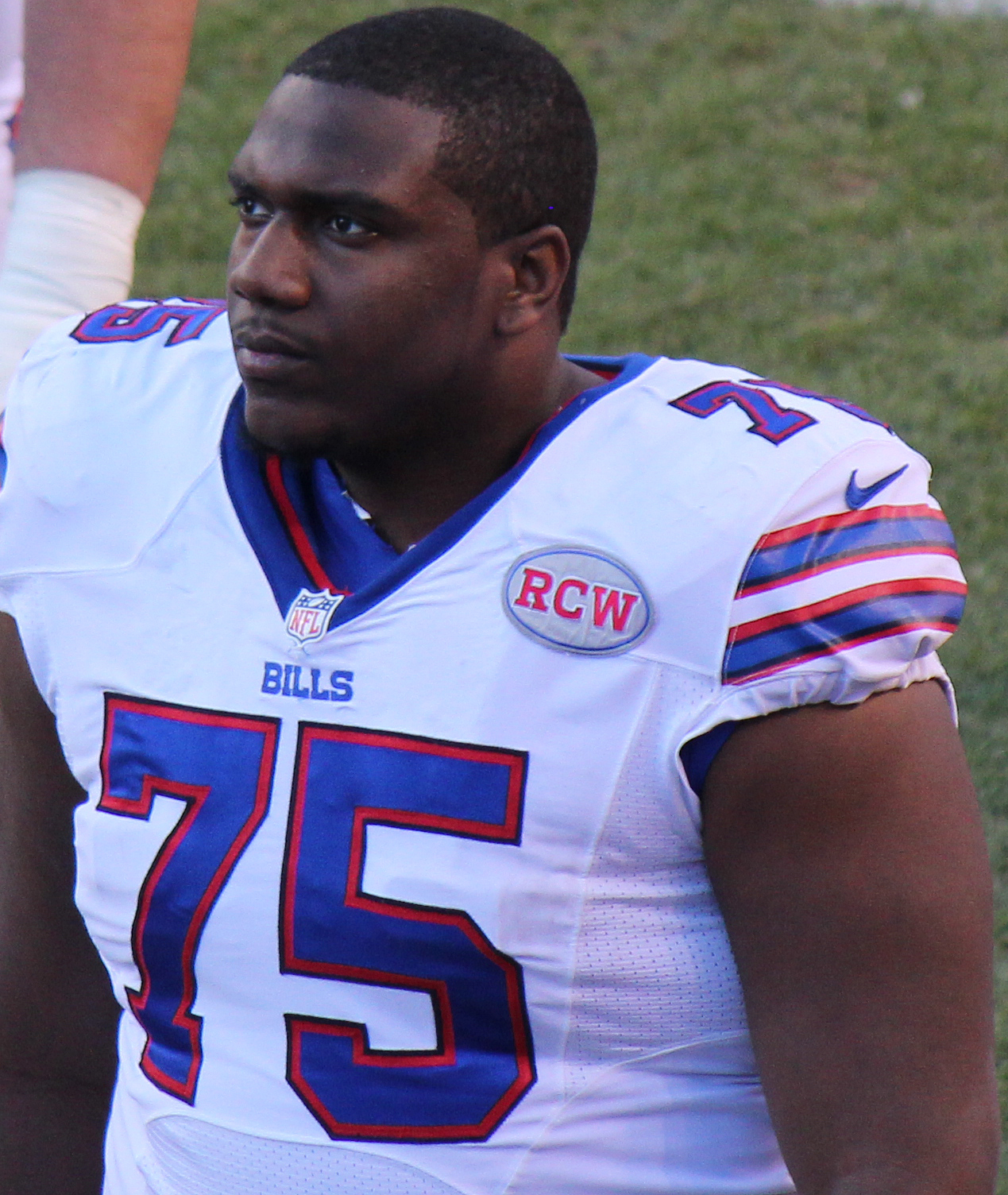
- Hairston with the Buffalo Bills in 2014

No. 75
- Position: Offensive tackle

Personal information
- Born: April 26, 1989 (age 37); Winston-Salem, North Carolina, U.S.
- Listed height: 6 ft 6 in (1.98 m)
- Listed weight: 330 lb (150 kg)

Career information
- High school: Carver (Winston-Salem)
- College: Clemson
- NFL draft: 2011: 4th round, 122nd overall pick

Career history
- Buffalo Bills (2011–2014); San Diego / Los Angeles Chargers (2015–2017)

Awards and highlights
- First-team All-ACC (2010); Second-team All-ACC (2009)

Career NFL statistics
- Games played: 74
- Games started: 31
- Fumble recoveries: 1
- Stats at Pro Football Reference

Christian Erin Hairston (born April 26, 1989) is an American former professional football player who was an offensive tackle in the National Football League (NFL). He was selected by the Buffalo Bills in the fourth round of the 2011 NFL draft. He played college football for the Clemson Tigers.

== Early life ==
Hairston attended Carver High School in Winston-Salem, North Carolina. He was named First-team all-state by Associated Press while at Carver High School. He was named an all-region and all-conference as a junior and senior. He played his entire senior year as a 16-year-old facing much older opponents.

Considered a three-star recruit by Rivals.com, he was ranked the No.53 offensive tackle in the nation. He chose an offer from Clemson over Hampton and South Carolina State.

== College career ==
During his career at Clemson University, he played in 47 games, including 36 starts. He was named to the First-team All-ACC in 2011 as a senior.

== Professional career ==
Pre-draft measurables
Height	Weight	Arm length	Hand span	Wingspan	40-yard dash	10-yard split	20-yard split	20-yard shuttle	Three-cone drill	Vertical jump	Broad jump	Bench press
6 ft 6 1/8 in (1.98 m)	326 lb (148 kg)	35 1/4 in (0.90 m)	9 1/4 in (0.23 m)	6 ft 10 5/8 in (2.10 m)	5.43 s	1.85 s	3.09 s	4.70 s	7.64 s	29.0 in (0.74 m)	8 ft 6 in (2.59 m)	33 reps
All values from NFL Combine/Pro Day

=== Buffalo Bills ===
Hairston was selected by the Buffalo Bills in the fourth round, 122nd overall of the 2011 NFL draft. On August 26, 2013, he was placed on the reserve/non-football illness list.

=== San Diego / Los Angeles Chargers ===
Hairston signed with the San Diego Chargers on April 15, 2015.

On March 16, 2016, Hairston signed a two-year contract with the Chargers.

On September 20, 2017, Hairston was placed on the reserve/non-football illness list, ending his 2017 season.
