= 1988 All-Atlantic Coast Conference football team =

American college football all-star team

The 1988 All-Atlantic Coast Conference football team consists of American football players chosen by various selectors for their All-Atlantic Coast Conference ("ACC") teams for the 1988 college football season. Selectors in 1988 included the Associated Press (AP).

== Offensive selections ==
=== Wide receivers ===
- Clarkston Hines, Duke (AP-1)
- Naz Worthen, NC State (AP-1)

=== Tackles ===
- Jeff Nunamacher, Clemson (AP-1)
- Chris Port, Duke (AP-1)

=== Guards ===
- Roy Brown, Virginia (AP-1)
- Pat Crowley, North Carolina (AP-1)

=== Centers ===
- Jeff Garnica, North Carolina (AP-1)

=== Tight ends ===
- Dave Colonna, Duke (AP-1)

=== Quarterbacks ===
- Anthony Dilweg, Duke (AP-1)

=== Running backs ===
- Terry Allen, Clemson (AP-1)
- Kennard Martin, North Carolina (AP-1)

== Defensive selections ==
=== Defensive linemen ===
- Ray Agnew, NC State (AP-1)
- Mark Drag, Clemson (AP-1)
- Warren Powers, Maryland (AP-1)
- Scott Auer, NC State (AP-1)
- Willis Crockett, Georgia Tech (AP-1)

=== Linebackers ===
- Jeff Lageman, Virginia (AP-1)
- Fred Stone, NC State (AP-1)

=== Defensive backs ===
- Donnell Woolford, Clemson (AP-1)
- A.J. Greene, Wake Forest (AP-1)
- Jesse Campbell, NC State (AP-1)
- Cedric Stallworth, Georgia Tech (AP-1)

== Special teams ==
=== Placekickers ===
- Dan Plocki, Maryland (AP-1)

=== Punters ===
- Martin Bailey, Wake Forest (AP-1)

== Key ==
AP = Associated Press

== See also ==
1988 College Football All-America Team
