= Clarkston Hines =

American football player (born 1967)

No. 12, 84
- Position: Wide receiver

Personal information
- Born: March 21, 1967 (age 59); Chapel Hill, North Carolina, U.S.

Career information
- High school: Bolles School (Jacksonville, Florida)
- College: Duke
- NFL draft: 1990: 9th round, 238th overall pick

Career history
- Buffalo Bills (1990)*; Raleigh–Durham Skyhawks (1991)
- * Offseason or practice squad member only

Awards and highlights
- Unanimous All-American (1989); First-team All-American (1988); ACC Male Athlete of the Year (1990); ACC Player of the Year (1989); 3× First team All-ACC (1987, 1988, 1989); Duke Sports Hall of Fame (1999); ACC 50th Anniversary team (2002)
- College Football Hall of Fame

Clarkston Hines (born March 21, 1967) is an American former professional football player who was a wide receiver in the National Football League (NFL) and World League of American Football (WLAF). He played college football for the Duke Blue Devils, twice earning first-team All-American honors, including a unanimous selection as a senior in 1989. He was inducted into the College Football Hall of Fame in 2010.

Hines was selected by the Buffalo Bills in the ninth round of the 1990 NFL draft. He spent a year on the Bills' practice squad and played one season in the WLAF for the Raleigh–Durham Skyhawks.

== Early life and college ==
Hines graduated from Bolles School in Jacksonville, Florida. While at Bolles, he was an all-state selection in both football and basketball.

He then attended Duke University, where he was an All-American football player. In 1989, he caught an ACC-record 17 touchdown passes and was named the ACC Football Offensive Player of the Year. He led the conference in receiving for three consecutive years in 1987, 1988 and 1989, and completed his career holding conference marks in receptions (189), reception yardage (3,318) and touchdown receptions (38). He was also named the 1990 ACC Male Athlete of the Year.

Clarkston was a three-time all conference and two-time All-American football player for Duke University. He was inducted into the Duke Athletics Hall of Fame (1999), named to the ACC 50th Anniversary Football Team (2003), and inducted into the College Football Hall of Fame (2010).

== Professional career ==
After graduating from Duke, Hines was a ninth-round (238th overall) selection of the Buffalo Bills in the 1990 NFL draft. He was released by the Bills in the final week of the preseason. He became a member of the practice squad for the 1990 Bills team, who reached Super Bowl XXV. He played a season for the Raleigh-Durham Skyhawks in the WLAF before retiring from football.

== Later life ==
Clarkston was the Vice President of DaVita Inc. Before opening PMI of Charlotte, Clarkston Hines spent 20 plus years in the corporate world in various leadership roles. For eight years, he was in a VP role leading a $275 Million operating division with over 1,100 employees for a Fortune 500 service company. Additionally, Clarkston led a team that managed over $400 Million in properties and assets in 11 states.

== Personal life ==
Clarkston lives in the Lake Norman area with his wife, their four children, three dogs and two cats. In his free time, he likes to work out, keep up with current events, and follow his favorite sports teams. He is also an active member of his local church. He and his wife Kathy reside in Statesville, North Carolina, with their four children.
