= Steve Fuchs =

American soccer player

Stephen “Steve” Fuchs is a former U.S. soccer goalkeeper. Fuchs earned three caps with the U.S. national team in 1988.

== Youth and college ==
Fuchs grew up in St. Louis, Missouri where he played for the Scott Gallagher youth soccer club. He attended DeSmet Jesuit High School. Following high school, he attended St. Louis University where he played on the men's soccer team from 1983 to 1986. In 1986, he was named to the second team All-American list.

== National team ==
In 1987, Fuchs was on the U.S. Pan American Games soccer team. Fuchs earned three caps with the U.S. national team in 1988. He earned his first cap in a 1–0 loss to Guatemala on January 10, 1988. His next two caps came in June 1988. On June 1, 1988, the U.S. tied Chile 1-1 and four days later, they lost to Chile 3–0.
