= Drue Pearce =

American businesswoman and politician

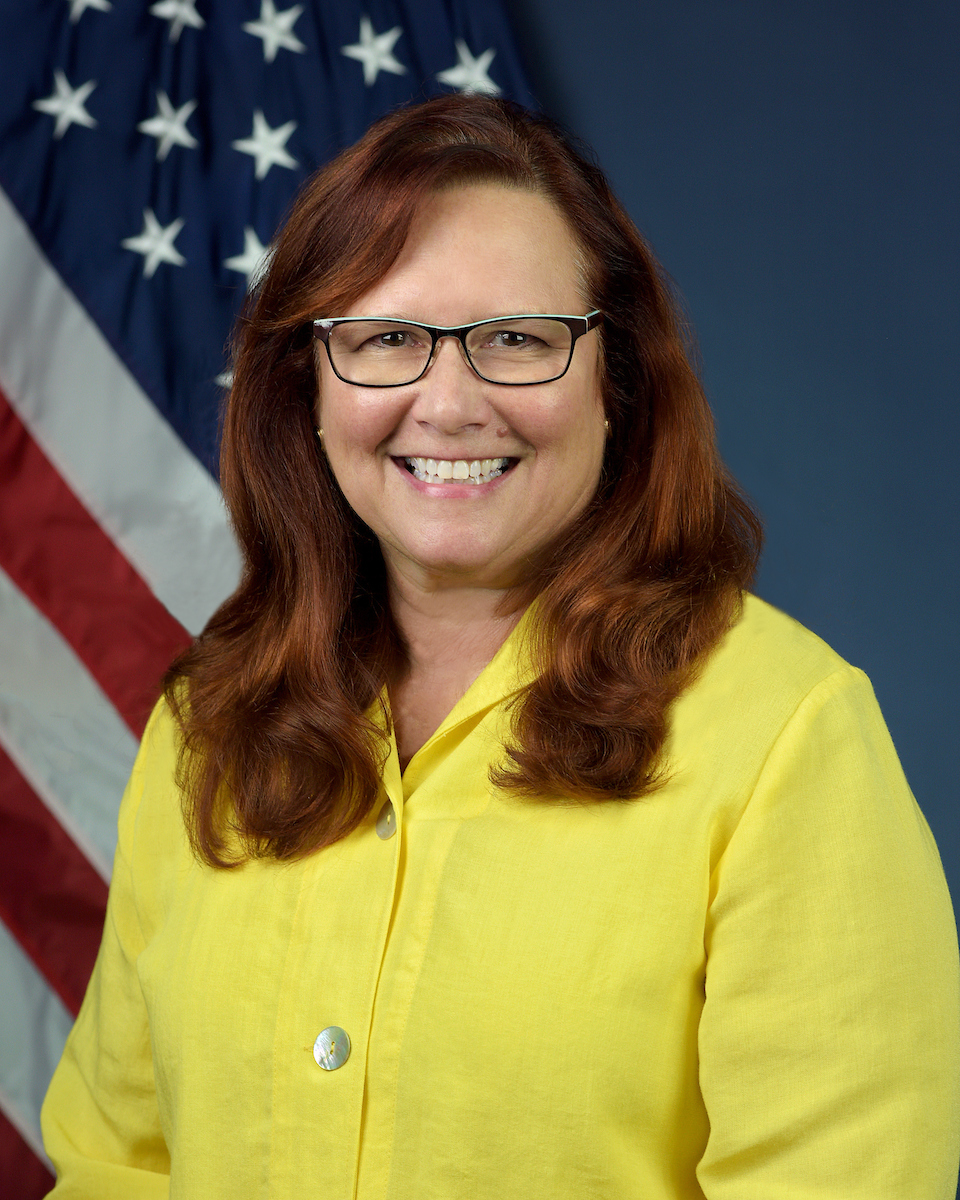

Deputy Administrator of the Pipeline and Hazardous Materials Safety Administration
- In office August 7, 2017 – January 20, 2021
- President: Donald Trump
- Preceded by: Timothy P. Butters
- Succeeded by: Tristan Brown

President of the Alaska State Senate
- In office 1995–1997
- Preceded by: Rick Halford
- Succeeded by: Mike Miller

Member of the Alaska Senate from the F district
- In office 1989–2001
- Preceded by: Mitchell Abood
- Succeeded by: Gene Therriault

Member of the Alaska House of Representatives from the 9 district
- In office 1985–1989
- Preceded by: Joe Hayes
- Succeeded by: Loren Leman

Personal details
- Born: April 2, 1951 (age 75) Fairfield, Illinois, U.S.
- Party: Republican
- Education: Indiana University Bloomington (BS); Harvard University (MS)

Drue Pearce (born April 2, 1951) is an American businesswoman and politician. She is currently Director, Government Affairs at Holland & Hart, LLP.

== Early life and education ==
Born in Fairfield, Illinois, Pearce received her bachelor's degree in biological science from Indiana University Bloomington in 1973. She then received her master's degree in public administration from the John F. Kennedy School of Government in 1984. In 1989, Pearce completed the Executive Program at the University of Virginia Darden School of Business.

== Career ==
Pearce lived in Anchorage, Alaska and was in the banking and real estate business. From 1985 to 1989, Pearce served in the Alaska House of Representatives and was a Republican. Then, from 1989 to 2001, Pearce served in the Alaska State Senate and was president of the senate in 1995 and 1999. In 2001, Pearce resigned from the Alaska Senate to be the senior advisor on Alaska Affairs to the Secretary of the United States Department of Interior serving from 2001 to 2006. From 2006 to 2010, Pearce served as the administrator of the Office of the Federal Coordinator, Alaska Natural Gas Transportation Projects overseeing the construction of the proposed Alaska Natural Gas Pipeline.
