= List of Boston College Eagles starting quarterbacks =

This is a list of American football quarterbacks who have started for the Boston College Eagles football team and the years they participated on the Boston College Eagles football team.

== Starting quarterbacks ==
Season(s)	Quarterback(s)
2026	Mason McKenzie
2025	Dylan Lonergan / Grayson James
2024	Tommy Castellanos / Grayson James
2023	Emmett Morehead / Thomas Castellanos
2022	Phil Jurkovec / Emmett Morehead
2021	Phil Jurkovec / Dennis Grosel
2020	Phil Jurkovec / Dennis Grosel
2019	Anthony Brown / Dennis Grosel
2018	Anthony Brown
2017	Anthony Brown / Darius Wade
2016	Patrick Towles
2015	Darius Wade / Troy Flutie / Jeff Smith / John Fadule
2014	Tyler Murphy
2013	Chase Rettig
2012	Chase Rettig
2011	Chase Rettig
2010	Dave Shinskie / Chase Rettig
2009	Justin Tuggle / Dave Shinskie
2008	Chris Crane / Dominique Davis
2007	Matt Ryan
2006	Matt Ryan / Chris Crane
2005	Quinton Porter / Matt Ryan
2004	Paul Peterson / Matt Ryan
2003	Quinton Porter / Paul Peterson
2002	Brian St. Pierre
2001	Brian St. Pierre
2000	Tim Hasselbeck / Brian St. Pierre
1999	Tim Hasselbeck / Brian St. Pierre
1998	Scott Mutryn
1997	Matt Hasselbeck / Scott Mutryn
1996	Matt Hasselbeck / Scott Mutryn
1995	Mark Hartsell / Matt Hasselbeck
1994	Mark Hartsell / Scott Mutryn
1993	Glenn Foley
1992	Glenn Foley
1991	Glenn Foley
1990	Glenn Foley / Willie Hicks
1989	Mike Power / Mark Kamphaus / Willie Hicks
1988	Mike Power / Mark Kamphaus
1987	Mike Power
1986	Shawn Halloran
1985	Shawn Halloran
1984	Doug Flutie
1983	Doug Flutie
1982	Doug Flutie
1981	Doug Guyer / John Loughery / Doug Flutie
1980	John Loughery
1979	John Loughery / Jay Palazola
1978	Jay Palazola / Dennis Scala
1977	Ken Smith
1976	Ken Smith
1975	Mike Kruczek
1974	Mike Kruczek
1973	Gary Marangi
1972	Gary Marangi
1971	Ray Rippman
1970	Frank Harris
1969	Frank Harris
1968	Joe Marzetti / Frank Harris / Mike Fallon
1967	Mike Fallon / Joe DiVito
1966	Dave Thomas / Joe Marzetti / Joe DiVito
1965	Ed Foley / John Blair
1964	Larry Marzetti / Ed Foley
1963	Jack Concannon
1962	Jack Concannon
1961	George VanCott
1960	John Amabile / George VanCott
1959	John Amabile / George VanCott
1958	Don Allard / Bill Brown / John Amabile
1957	Don Allard
1956	Bill Donlan
1955	Bill Donlan
1954	Jim Kane
1953	Jim Kane
1952	Jim Kane
1951	Jim Kane
1950	Dick McBride
1949	Butch Songin
1948	Butch Songin
1947	Butch Songin
1946	Don Panciera
1945	Ed Cronin
1944	Charlie Englert / Ed Cronin
1943	Eddie Doherty
1942	Eddie Doherty
1941	Eddie Doherty
1940	Charlie O'Rourke / Henry Toczylowski
1939	Charlie O'Rourke
1938	Charlie O'Rourke
