= Mike Power =

Mike Power may refer to:

- Mike Power (American football) (fl. 1980s–2000s), American football quarterback
- Mike Power (Australian footballer) (born 1955), Australian rules footballer
