= Kamphaus =

Kamphaus is a surname. Notable people with the surname include:

- Franz Kamphaus (1932-2024), German Catholic priest, bishop emeritus of Limburg
- Mark Kamphaus, American football player

== See also ==
- Campenhausen
