= Frank Power =

Frank Power may refer to:

- Frank Power (politician)
- Frank Power (basketball)
