= 2018 Temple Owls football team =

American college football season

2018 Temple Owls football

Independence Bowl, L 27–56 vs. Duke
- Conference: American Athletic Conference
- East Division
- Record: 8–5 (7–1 The American)
- Head coach: Geoff Collins (2nd season; regular season); Ed Foley (interim; bowl game)
- Offensive coordinator: Dave Patenaude (2nd season)
- Offensive scheme: Pro spread
- Defensive coordinator: Andrew Thacker (1st season)
- Base defense: 4–3
- Home stadium: Lincoln Financial Field

Uniform
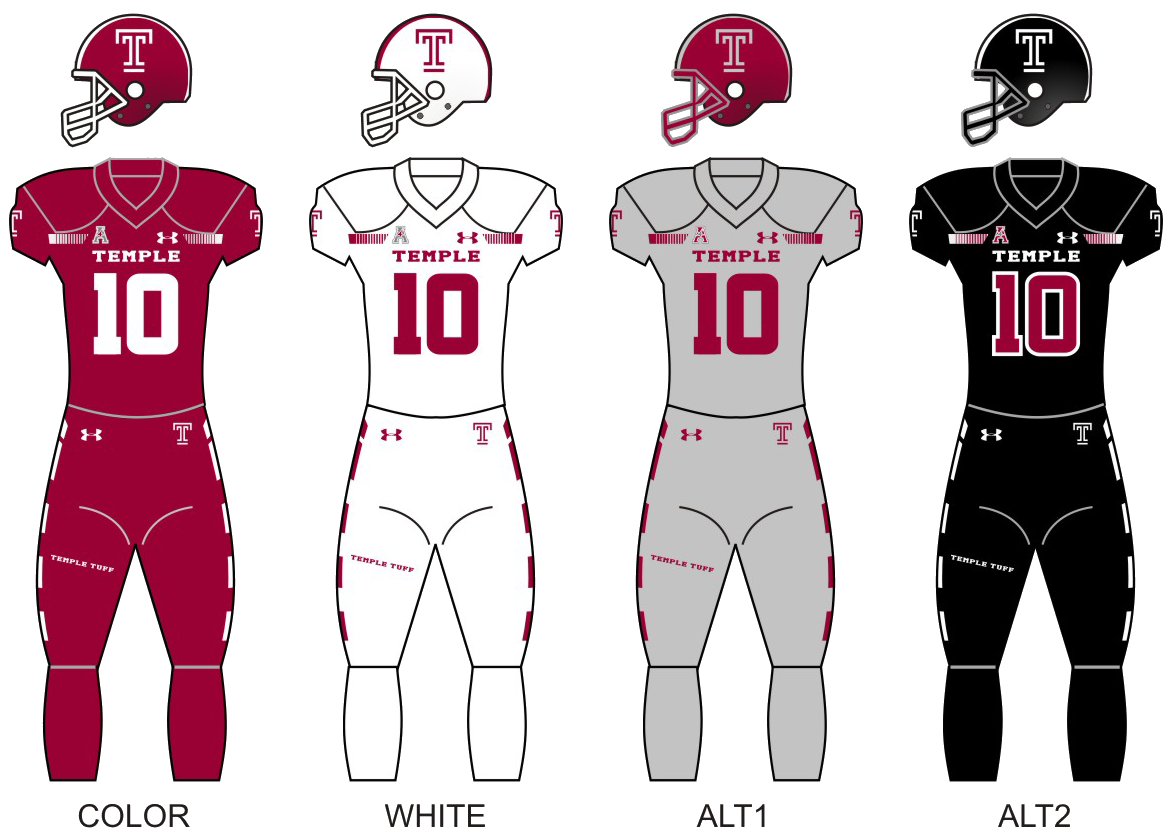

2018 American Athletic Conference football standings
	Conf.			Overall
Team	W		L	W		L
East Division
No. 11 UCF x$	8	–	0	12	–	1
Temple	7	–	1	8	–	5
No. 24 Cincinnati	6	–	2	11	–	2
South Florida	3	–	5	7	–	6
East Carolina	1	–	7	3	–	9
UConn	0	–	8	1	–	11
West Division
Memphis xy	5	–	3	8	–	6
Houston x	5	–	3	8	–	5
Tulane x	5	–	3	7	–	6
SMU	4	–	4	5	–	7
Navy	2	–	6	3	–	10
Tulsa	2	–	6	3	–	9
Championship: UCF 56, Memphis 41
$ – Conference champion; x – Division champion/co-champions; y – Championship game participant; Rankings from AP Poll

The 2018 Temple Owls football team represented Temple University in the 2018 NCAA Division I FBS football season. The Owls were led by second-year head coach Geoff Collins during the regular season and played their home games at Lincoln Financial Field. They are members of the East Division of the American Athletic Conference. They finished the season 8–5, 7–1 in AAC play to finish in 2nd place in the East Division. They were invited to play in the Independence Bowl, where they lost to Duke.

On December 7, 2018, head coach Geoff Collins left for the head coaching job at Georgia Tech. Tight ends coach Ed Foley led the Owls in the Independence Bowl. On December 13, the Owls initially named Miami defensive coordinator Manny Diaz as their new head coach. However, on December 30, Diaz went back to Miami to become their new head coach following Mark Richt's sudden retirement.

== Preseason ==
=== Award watch lists ===
Listed in the order that they were released

Award	Player	Position	Year
Rimington Trophy	Matt Hennessy	C	So
Chuck Bednarik Award	Delvon Randall	S	SR
Maxwell Award	Frank Nutile	QB	SR
Doak Walker Award	Ryquell Armstead	RB	JR
John Mackey Award	Kenny Yeboah	TE	SO
Jim Thorpe Award	Delvon Randall	S	SR
Bronko Nagurski Trophy	Delvon Randall	S	SR
Paul Hornung Award	Isaiah Wright	WR/KR	JR
Wuerffel Trophy	Frank Nutile	QB	SR
Ray Guy Award	Connor Bowler	P	FR

=== AAC media poll ===
The AAC media poll was released on July 24, 2018, with the Owls predicted to finish in third place in the AAC East Division.

Media poll (East)
Predicted finish	Team	Votes (1st place)
1	UCF	175 (25)
2	USF	140 (5)
3	Temple	132
4	Cincinnati	91
5	UConn	51
6	East Carolina	41

== Schedule ==
Date	Time	Opponent	Site	TV	Result	Attendance
September 1	12:00 p.m.	No. 19 (FCS) Villanova*	Lincoln Financial Field; Philadelphia, PA (Mayor's Cup)	ESPNews	L 17–19	32,357
September 8	3:30 p.m.	Buffalo*	Lincoln Financial Field; Philadelphia, PA	ESPN3	L 29–36	25,511
September 15	12:00 p.m.	at Maryland*	Maryland Stadium; College Park, MD	BTN	W 35–14	32,057
September 20	7:30 p.m.	Tulsa	Lincoln Financial Field; Philadelphia, PA	ESPN	W 31–17	24,217
September 29	12:00 p.m.	at Boston College*	Alumni Stadium; Chestnut Hill, MA	ESPNU	L 35–45	40,111
October 6	12:00 p.m.	East Carolina	Lincoln Financial Field; Philadelphia, PA	ESPNews	W 49–6	26,681
October 13	3:30 p.m.	at Navy	Navy–Marine Corps Memorial Stadium; Annapolis, MD	CBSSN	W 24–17	30,106
October 20	12:00 p.m.	No. 20 Cincinnati^{†}	Lincoln Financial Field; Philadelphia, PA	ESPNU	W 24–17 ^{OT}	33,026
November 1	7:30 p.m.	at No. 9 UCF	Spectrum Stadium; Orlando, FL	ESPN	L 40–52	41,153
November 10	7:00 p.m.	at Houston	TDECU Stadium; Houston, TX	CBSSN	W 59–49	30,862
November 17	12:00 p.m.	South Florida	Lincoln Financial Field; Philadelphia, PA	ESPNews	W 27–17	21,029
November 24	3:30 p.m.	at UConn	Rentschler Field; East Hartford, CT	ESPNU	W 57–7	18,203
December 27	1:30 p.m.	vs. Duke*	Independence Stadium; Shreveport, LA (Independence Bowl)	ESPN	L 27–56	27,492
*Non-conference game; ^{†}Homecoming; Rankings from AP Poll released prior to the game; All times are in Eastern time

== Personnel ==
=== Coaching staff ===
Name	Position	Joined Staff
Geoff Collins	Head coach	2017
Ed Foley	Assistant head coach/Tight ends/Special Teams	2008
Jim Panagos	Assistant head coach/defensive line/Run Game Coordinator	2017
Dave Patenaude	Offensive coordinator/quarterbacks	2017
Andrew Thacker	Defensive coordinator/linebackers	2017
Tony Lucas	Running backs	2017
Stan Hixon	Wide receivers	2017
Chris Wiesehan	offensive line/Run Game Coordinator	2014
Nate Burton	Defensive backs	2018
Adam DiMichele	Recruiting Coordinator/Offensive assistant	2014
Larry Knight	Outside linebackers	2017
Tim Conner	Offensive Analyst	2017
Tom Pajic	Senior Offensive Analyst	2017
Jason Semore	Senior Defensive Analyst	2018
Reggie Garrett	Director of Player Personnel	2016
Ronell Williams	Defensive Analyst	2017
David Feeley	Head Strength & Conditioning Coach	2017

=== 2018 recruiting class ===
College recruiting (2018)
Name	Hometown	School	Height	Weight	Commit date
Trad Beatty; QB	Columbia, SC	Ben Lippen School	6 ft 4 in (1.93 m)	210 lb (95 kg)	Jun 20, 2017
Trad Beatty; QB	Recruit ratings: Rivals: 247Sports:				
Travon King; LB	Camden, NJ	Woodrow Wilson High School	6 ft 4 in (1.93 m)	205 lb (93 kg)	Jan 21, 2018
Travon King; LB	Recruit ratings: Rivals: 247Sports: ESPN:				
Daesean Winston; LB	Severn, MD	Archbishop Spalding High School	6 ft 2 in (1.88 m)	205 lb (93 kg)	Jun 17, 2017
Daesean Winston; LB	Recruit ratings: Rivals: 247Sports:				
Chauncey Moore; DB	Washington, D.C.	Friendship Collegiate Academy	5 ft 11 in (1.80 m)	175 lb (79 kg)	Jun 18, 2017
Chauncey Moore; DB	Recruit ratings: Rivals: 247Sports:				
Kyle Dobbins; RB	Philadelphia	Timber Creek High School	5 ft 10 in (1.78 m)	180 lb (82 kg)	Jun 20, 2017
Kyle Dobbins; RB	Recruit ratings: Rivals: 247Sports:				
Amir Gillis; ATH	Philadelphia	Simon Gratz High School	5 ft 11 in (1.80 m)	192 lb (87 kg)	Jun 18, 2017
Amir Gillis; ATH	Recruit ratings: Rivals: 247Sports:				
Dante Burke; DE	Virginia Beach, VA	Bishop Sullivan Catholic High School	6 ft 3 in (1.91 m)	230 lb (100 kg)	Jun 29, 2017
Dante Burke; DE	Recruit ratings: Rivals: 247Sports:				
Sean Ryan; WR	Brooklyn, NY	Erasmus Hall High School	6 ft 2 in (1.88 m)	180 lb (82 kg)	Aug 2, 2017
Sean Ryan; WR	Recruit ratings: Rivals: 247Sports: ESPN:				
Jobdariel Gomez; OL	Miami, FL	ASA College	6 ft 5 in (1.96 m)	300 lb (140 kg)	Dec 18, 2017
Jobdariel Gomez; OL	Recruit ratings: Rivals: 247Sports:				
Khristopher Banks; DL	Wayne, NJ	DePaul Catholic High School	6 ft 4 in (1.93 m)	280 lb (130 kg)	Dec 19, 2017
Khristopher Banks; DL	Recruit ratings: Rivals: 247Sports: ESPN:				
Elijah Clark; DB	Parlin, NJ	Sayreville War Memorial High School	6 ft 3 in (1.91 m)	165 lb (75 kg)	Apr 22, 2017
Elijah Clark; DB	Recruit ratings: Rivals: 247Sports:				
Jean Paul Rodriguez; OL	Lakewood, NJ	Lakewood High School	6 ft 5 in (1.96 m)	275 lb (125 kg)	Jun 15, 2017
Jean Paul Rodriguez; OL	Recruit ratings: Rivals: 247Sports:				
Kadas Reams; WR	New Berlin, NY	Milford Academy	6 ft 1 in (1.85 m)	175 lb (79 kg)	Jun 21, 2017
Kadas Reams; WR	Recruit ratings: Rivals: 247Sports:				
Evan Boozer; OL	Towson, MD	Loyola High School	6 ft 4 in (1.93 m)	240 lb (110 kg)	Jun 23, 2017
Evan Boozer; OL	Recruit ratings: Rivals: 247Sports:				
David Martin-Robinson; WR	Landisville, PA	Hempfield High School	6 ft 4 in (1.93 m)	220 lb (100 kg)	Jun 27, 2017
David Martin-Robinson; WR	Recruit ratings: Rivals: 247Sports:				
Adam Klein; OL	Springfield, PA	Episcopal Academy	6 ft 4 in (1.93 m)	255 lb (116 kg)	Jul 10, 2017
Adam Klein; OL	Recruit ratings: Rivals: 247Sports:				
Oskarr Andersson; OL	Solna, Sweden	RIG Academy	6 ft 5 in (1.96 m)	280 lb (130 kg)	Aug 7, 2017
Oskarr Andersson; OL	Recruit ratings: Rivals: 247Sports:				
Aaron Jarman; TE	La Grange, NC	North Lenoir High School	6 ft 5 in (1.96 m)	243 lb (110 kg)	Jul 14, 2017
Aaron Jarman; TE	Recruit ratings: Rivals: 247Sports:				
Jordan Smith; WR	Davie, FL	Western High School	6 ft 3 in (1.91 m)	190 lb (86 kg)	Oct 26, 2017
Jordan Smith; WR	Recruit ratings: Rivals: 247Sports:				
Isaac Moore; DL	Orebro, Sweden	Orebro Black Knights	6 ft 6 in (1.98 m)	295 lb (134 kg)	Nov 22, 2017
Isaac Moore; DL	Recruit ratings: Rivals: 247Sports:				
Nickolos Madourie; DL	Bottineau, ND	Dakota College	6 ft 5 in (1.96 m)	245 lb (111 kg)	Dec 17, 2017
Nickolos Madourie; DL	Recruit ratings: Rivals: 247Sports: ESPN:				
Ronnie Stevenson; WR	Montour, PA	Montour High School	6 ft 5 in (1.96 m)	205 lb (93 kg)	Jun 11, 2017
Ronnie Stevenson; WR	Recruit ratings: Rivals: 247Sports:				
Antonio Colclough; DL	Brooklyn, NY	Cardinal Hayes High School	6 ft 5 in (1.96 m)	225 lb (102 kg)	Jun 17, 2017
Antonio Colclough; DL	Recruit ratings: Rivals: 247Sports:				
Layton Jordan; ATH	McKeesport, PA	McKeesport Area High School	6 ft 3 in (1.91 m)	200 lb (91 kg)	Dec 7, 2017
Layton Jordan; ATH	Recruit ratings: Rivals: 247Sports:				
Jose Barbon; WR	Lancaster, PA	Conestoga Valley High School	6 ft 0 in (1.83 m)	175 lb (79 kg)	Dec 19, 2017
Jose Barbon; WR	Recruit ratings: Rivals: 247Sports:				
David Nwaogwugwu; DL	Bronx, NY	De Witt Clinton High School	6 ft 6 in (1.98 m)	230 lb (100 kg)	Jan 21, 2018
David Nwaogwugwu; DL	Recruit ratings: Rivals: 247Sports: ESPN:				
Tyreke Young; DL	Hilton Head Island, SC	Hilton Head High School	6 ft 2 in (1.88 m)	185 lb (84 kg)	Jan 21, 2018
Tyreke Young; DL	Recruit ratings: Rivals: 247Sports:				
Onasis Neely; RB	Enola, PA	East Pennsboro High School	5 ft 11 in (1.80 m)	195 lb (88 kg)	Nov 28, 2017
Onasis Neely; RB	Recruit ratings: Rivals: 247Sports:				
Overall recruit ranking:
Note: In many cases, Scout, Rivals, 247Sports, On3, and ESPN may conflict in their listings of height and weight.; In these cases, the average was taken. ESPN grades are on a 100-point scale.; Sources: "Temple Signee List 2018". Rivals.; "2018 Player Signees – Temple". ESPN.; "2018 Team Ranking". Rivals.com.

== Game summaries ==
=== Villanova ===
	1	2	3	4	Total
No. 19 (FCS) Wildcats	13	0	0	6	19
Owls	3	7	7	0	17

=== Buffalo ===
	1	2	3	4	Total
Bulls	6	6	10	14	36
Owls	0	7	7	15	29

=== At Maryland ===
	1	2	3	4	Total
Owls	7	14	7	7	35
Terrapins	0	7	0	7	14

=== Tulsa ===
	1	2	3	4	Total
Golden Hurricane	7	3	0	7	17
Owls	7	14	7	3	31

=== At Boston College ===
	1	2	3	4	Total
Owls	14	7	7	7	35
Eagles	13	18	7	7	45

=== East Carolina ===
	1	2	3	4	Total
Pirates	0	3	0	3	6
Owls	14	21	7	7	49

=== At Navy ===
	1	2	3	4	Total
Owls	0	7	10	7	24
Midshipmen	0	10	7	0	17

=== Cincinnati ===
	1	2	3	4	OT	Total
No. 20 Bearcats	7	3	7	0	0	17
Owls	10	0	0	7	7	24

=== At UCF ===
	1	2	3	4	Total
Owls	17	17	0	6	40
No. 9 Knights	14	14	14	10	52

=== At Houston ===
	1	2	3	4	Total
Owls	14	14	21	10	59
Cougars	7	7	21	14	49

Doak Walker Award candidate Ryquell Armstead, playing on a sore ankle and missing part of the game to have his hand x-rayed, tied a career-best with 210 yards rushing and became the first college player in two years with six rushing touchdowns in a game. He was named conference offensive player of the week, and college offensive player of the week by three groups. This moved him from seventh to third on the AAC's all-time rushing touchdown list with 33, and from seventh to fifth on the rushing yards list with 2,692. On Temple's lists, he also passed Jahad Thomas for touchdowns, 100+ yard games, and career yards—also passing Anthony Anderson and Matt Brown in the latter category—to reach third, tied for fourth with Matt Brown, and fourth respectively all-time.

=== South Florida ===
	1	2	3	4	Total
Bulls	7	10	0	0	17
Owls	0	0	10	17	27

=== At UConn ===
	1	2	3	4	Total
Owls	13	27	7	10	57
Huskies	7	0	0	0	7

=== Vs. Duke–Independence Bowl ===
	1	2	3	4	Total
Owls	13	14	0	0	27
Blue Devils	7	14	21	14	56

== Awards and honors ==
=== National awards ===
- The Sporting News All-American Team

Isaiah Wright - Returner

=== Conference awards ===
==== American Athletic Conference Players of the Year ====
- The American - Special Teams Player of the Year

Isaiah Wright

==== American Athletic Conference All-Conference Team ====
- First Team

Ryquell Armstead, RB
Shaun Bradley, LB
Michael Dogbe, DT
Delvon Randall, S
Rock Ya-Sin, CB
Isaiah Wright, KR

- Second Team

Ventell Bryant, WR
Jovahn Fair, OL

== NFL players ==
=== NFL Draft Combine ===
One Temple player was invited to participate in the 2018 NFL Scouting Combine.

#	Name	POS	HT	WT	Hands	40	Bench Press	Vert Jump	Broad Jump	3 Cone Drill	20-yd Shuttle	Ref
#6	Rock Ya-Sin	CB	6'0"	192 lbs	9 7/8"	4.51	18	39.5	129.0	7.31	4.31	
#7	Ryquell Armstead	RB	5'11"	220 lbs	9 1/8"	4.45	22	30.0	114.0	7.02	4.29	

† Top performer

=== 2019 NFL draft ===
Following the season, the following members of the Temple football team were selected in the 2019 NFL draft.

Round	Pick	Player	Position	NFL club
2	34	Rock Ya-Sin	CB	Indianapolis Colts
5	140	Ryquell Armstead	RB	Jacksonville Jaguars
7	249	Michael Dogbe	DE	Arizona Cardinals

In addition to the draft selections above, the following Temple players signed NFL contracts after the draft.

#	Name	POS	HT	WT	NFL club	Ref
#1	Ventell Bryant	WR	6-3	200 lbs	Cincinnati Bengals	
#2	Delvon Randall	DB	6-1	215 lbs	Philadelphia Eagles	
#4	Rob Ritrovato	FB	6-2	240 lbs	New York Giants	
#77	Jaelin Robinson	OL	6-6	325 lbs	Atlanta Falcons	
#85	Chris Myarick	TE	6-5	250 lbs	Miami Dolphins	
