= 2026 Rutgers Scarlet Knights football team =

American college football season

2026 Rutgers Scarlet Knights football
- Conference: Big Ten Conference
- Record: 3–8 (2–6 Big Ten)
- Head coach: Greg Schiano (18th season)
- Offensive coordinator: Kirk Ciarrocca (6th season)
- Offensive scheme: Spread
- Defensive coordinator: Travis Johansen (1st season)
- Base defense: Multiple
- Home stadium: SHI Stadium

Uniform

2026 Big Ten Conference football standings
| | Conf. | | | Overall |
| Team | W | | L | W | | L |
|---|---|---|---|---|---|---|
| No. 4 UCLA | 7 | – | 1 | 10 | – | 1 |
| No. 8 Indiana | 6 | – | 2 | 9 | – | 2 |
| No. 15 Iowa | 6 | – | 2 | 9 | – | 2 |
| No. 13 Oregon | 6 | – | 2 | 8 | – | 3 |
| No. 18 USC | 5 | – | 3 | 8 | – | 3 |
| No. 14 Ohio State | 5 | – | 3 | 7 | – | 4 |
| Wisconsin | 5 | – | 3 | 7 | – | 4 |
| Nebraska | 4 | – | 4 | 7 | – | 4 |
| Washington | 4 | – | 4 | 7 | – | 4 |
| Illinois | 4 | – | 4 | 6 | – | 5 |
| Minnesota | 4 | – | 4 | 6 | – | 5 |
| Michigan | 3 | – | 5 | 6 | – | 5 |
| Northwestern | 3 | – | 5 | 6 | – | 5 |
| Penn State | 3 | – | 5 | 6 | – | 5 |
| Maryland | 2 | – | 6 | 4 | – | 7 |
| Purdue | 2 | – | 6 | 3 | – | 8 |
| Rutgers | 2 | – | 6 | 3 | – | 8 |
| Michigan State | 1 | – | 7 | 3 | – | 8 |
Championship: December 5, 2026
^ – College Football Playoff participant; $ – Conference champion; y – Championship game participant; As of November 22, 2026; Rankings from CFP rankings

The 2026 Rutgers Scarlet Knights football team represents Rutgers University as a member of the Big Ten Conference during the 2026 NCAA Division I FBS football season. The Scarlet Knights are led by 18th-year head coach Greg Schiano and play home games at SHI Stadium located in Piscataway, New Jersey.

== Schedule ==
| Date | Time | Opponent | Site | TV | Result | Attendance |
|---|---|---|---|---|---|---|
| September 3 | 6:00 p.m. | UMass* | SHI Stadium; Piscataway, NJ | BTN | L 21–37 | 42,454 |
| September 11 | 7:30 p.m. | at Boston College* | Alumni Stadium; Chestnut Hill, MA | ESPN2 | L 21–28 | 40,611 |
| September 19 | 3:30 p.m. | No. 12 USC | SHI Stadium; Piscataway, NJ | CBS | L 35–42 | 43,045 |
| September 25 | 7:00 p.m. | Howard* | SHI Stadium; Piscataway, NJ | BTN | W 58–7 | 34,466 |
| October 3 | 8:00 p.m. | No. 6 Indiana^{†} | SHI Stadium; Piscataway, NJ | BTN | L 15–47 | 48,650 |
| October 17 | 12:30 p.m. | at Maryland | SECU Stadium; College Park, MD (rivalry) | BTN | W 37–30 | 39,326 |
| October 24 | 12:00 p.m. | at No. 24 Northwestern | Ryan Field; Evanston, IL | Peacock | L 14–42 | 27,156 |
| October 31 | 12:30 p.m. | Michigan | SHI Stadium; Piscataway, NJ | BTN | L 21–28 | 39,540 |
| November 7 | 4:15 p.m. | at Wisconsin | Camp Randall Stadium; Madison, WI | BTN | L 10–31 | 66,310 |
| November 14 | 12:30 p.m. | Nebraska | SHI Stadium; Piscataway, NJ | BTN | L 0–31 | 36,425 |
| November 21 | 3:30 p.m. | at Penn State | Beaver Stadium; University Park, PA | FS1 | W 25–24 | 106,200 |
| November 28 | 4:15 p.m. | Michigan State | SHI Stadium; Piscataway, NJ | BTN | | |
*Non-conference game; ^{†}Homecoming; Rankings from AP Poll (and CFP Rankings, after November 3) – Released prior to game; All times are in Eastern time; Source:

== Game summaries ==
=== vs. UMass ===
UMass Minutemen (0–0) at Rutgers Scarlet Knights (0–0) – Game summary

| Quarter | 1 | 2 | 3 | 4 | Total |
|---|---|---|---|---|---|
| Minutemen | 7 | 17 | 3 | 10 | 37 |
| Scarlet Knights | 7 | 0 | 0 | 14 | 21 |

at SHI Stadium • Piscataway, New Jersey

- Date: September 3
- Game time: 6:00 p.m. EST
- Game weather: Cloudy • Temperature: 86 °F (30 °C) • Wind: W 6 MPH
- Game attendance: 42,454
- Referee: Mark Kluczynski
- TV announcers (BTN): Jason Horowitz, Anthony Herron, and Dannie Rogers

Game information
First quarter
- RUTG – KJ Duff 4-yard pass from Dylan Lonergan (Dane Pizzaro kick), 8:20. Scarlet Knights 7–0. Drive: 12 plays, 75 yards, 6:40.
- MASS – Elijah Faulkner 21-yard pass from William Watson III (Derek Morris kick), 5:26. Tied 7–7. Drive: 7 plays, 75 yards, 2:54.

Second quarter

- MASS – Elijah Faulkner 2-yard pass from William Watson III (Derek Morris kick), 11:46. Minutemen 14–7. Drive: 13 plays, 68 yards, 7:28.
- MASS – Joseph Griffin Jr. 31-yard pass from William Watson III (Derek Morris kick), 9:43. Minutemen 21–7. Drive: 2 plays, 36 yards, 0:33.
- MASS – Derek Morris 30-yard field goal, 3:42. Minutemen 24–7. Drive: 8 plays, 51 yards, 4:21.

Third quarter

- MASS – Derek Morris 52-yard field goal, 8:22. Minutemen 27–7. Drive: 10 plays, 41 yards, 6:38.

Fourth quarter

- MASS – Derek Morris 31-yard field goal, 7:54. Minutemen 30–7. Drive: 4 plays, -6 yards, 3:10.
- RUTG – KJ Duff 78-yard pass from Dylan Lonergan (Dane Pizzaro kick), 7:09. Minutemen 30–14. Drive: 4 plays, 75 yards, 0:45.
- MASS – Curtis Kimmons IV 17-yard run (Derek Morris kick), 4:27. Minutemen 37–14. Drive: 2 plays, 22 yards, 0:08.
- RUTG – KJ Duff 6-yard pass from AJ Surace (Dane Pizzaro kick), 1:57. Minutemen 37–21. Drive: 11 plays, 75 yards, 2:30.

| Statistics | MASS | RUTG |
|---|---|---|
| First downs | 21 | 18 |
| Plays–yards | 63–397 | 63–349 |
| Rushes–yards | 41–200 | 25–30 |
| Passing yards | 197 | 319 |
| Passing: comp–att–int | 19–22–0 | 22–38–3 |
| Turnovers | 0 | 4 |
| Time of possession | 36:21 | 23:39 |

| Team | Category | Player | Statistics |
|---|---|---|---|
| UMass | Passing | William Watson III | 19/22, 197 yards, 3 TD |
| UMass | Rushing | Curtis Kimmons IV | 11 carries, 78 yards, TD |
| UMass | Receiving | Joseph Griffin Jr. | 2 receptions, 61 yards, TD |
| Rutgers | Passing | Dylan Lonergan | 16/29, 242 yards, 2 TD, 3 INT |
| Rutgers | Rushing | Antwan Raymond | 14 carries, 42 yards |
| Rutgers | Receiving | KJ Duff | 9 receptions, 196 yards, 3 TD |

=== at Boston College ===
Rutgers Scarlet Knights (0–1) at Boston College Eagles (0–1) – Game summary

| Quarter | 1 | 2 | 3 | 4 | Total |
|---|---|---|---|---|---|
| Scarlet Knights | 0 | 7 | 7 | 7 | 21 |
| Eagles | 14 | 6 | 0 | 8 | 28 |

at Alumni Stadium • Chestnut Hill, Massachusetts

- Date: September 11
- Game time: 7:30 p.m. EST
- Game weather: Sunny • Temperature: 75 °F (24 °C)
- Game attendance: 40,611
- Referee: Gregory Blum
- TV announcers (ESPN2): Mike Monaco, Jordan Rodgers, and Dana Boyle

Game information

First quarter

- BC – Evan Dickens 19-yard run (Luca Lombardo kick), 10:42. Eagles 7–0. Drive: 5 plays, 34 yards, 2:26.
- BC – Mason McKenzie 10-yard run (Luca Lombardo kick), 5:15. Eagles 14–0. Drive: 4 plays, 77 yards, 2:02.

Second quarter

- BC– Luca Lombardo 30-yard field goal, 13:33. Eagles 17–0. Drive: 11 plays, 63 yards, 4:24.
- RUTG – Antwan Raymond 4-yard pass from AJ Surace (Dane Pizzaro kick), 1:55. Eagles 17–7. Drive: 15 plays, 72 yards, 8:29.
- BC – Luca Lombardo 46-yard field goal, 0:00. Eagles 20–7. Drive: 11 plays, 47 yards, 1:55.

Third quarter

- RUTG – KJ Duff 4-yard pass from AJ Surace (Dane Pizzaro kick), 2:37. Eagles 20–14. Drive: 7 plays, 52 yards, 4:10.

Fourth quarter

- BC – Dawson Pough 78-yard pass from Mason McKenzie (Mason McKenzie two-pass pass conversion to Johnathan Montague Jr.), 7:06. Eagles 28–14. Drive: 5 plays, 92 yards, 2:21.
- RUTG – KJ Duff 60-yard pass from AJ Surace (Dane Pizzaro kick), 6:18. Eagles 28–21. Drive: 2 plays, 75 yards, 0:48.

| Statistics | RUTG | BC |
|---|---|---|
| First downs | 19 | 18 |
| Total yards | 384 | 402 |
| Rushes–yards | 41–154 | 32–150 |
| Passing yards | 230 | 252 |
| Passing: comp–att–int | 18–27–4 | 18–29–2 |
| Turnovers | 4 | 3 |
| Time of possession | 34:32 | 25:28 |

| Team | Category | Player | Statistics |
|---|---|---|---|
| Rutgers | Passing | AJ Surace | 18/27, 230 yards, 3 TD, 4 INT |
| Rutgers | Rushing | Antwan Raymond | 27 carries, 134 yards |
| Rutgers | Receiving | KJ Duff | 8 receptions, 137 yards, 2 TD |
| Boston College | Passing | Mason McKenzie | 18/29, 252 yards, TD, 2 INT |
| Boston College | Rushing | Mason McKenzie | 13 carries, 94 yards, TD |
| Boston College | Receiving | Dawson Pough | 4 receptions, 106 yards, TD |

=== vs. No. 12 USC ===
No. 12 USC Trojans (3–0) at Rutgers Scarlet Knights (0–2) – Game summary

| Quarter | 1 | 2 | 3 | 4 | Total |
|---|---|---|---|---|---|
| No. 12 Trojans | 10 | 10 | 15 | 7 | 42 |
| Scarlet Knights | 7 | 7 | 14 | 7 | 35 |

at SHI Stadium • Piscataway, New Jersey

- Date: September 19
- Game time: 3:30 p.m. EST
- Game weather: Sunny • Temperature: 76 °F (24 °C) • Wind: S at 5 miles per hour (8.0 km/h)
- Game attendance: 43,045
- Referee: Jim Wharrie
- TV announcers (CBS): Brad Nessler, Charles Davis, and Jenny Dell

Game information

First Quarter

- (9:30) USC - Caden Chittenden 35-yard field goal (Drive: 12 plays, 58 yards, 5:30; USC 3-0)
- (8:08) USC - King Miller 11-yard rush (Chaden Chittenden kick), (Drive: 2 plays, 24 yards, 0:35; USC 10-0)
- (0:04) Rutgers - K.J. Duff Jr. 11-yard pass from Dylan Lonergan (Dane Pizzaro kick), (Drive: 12 plays, 75 yards, 8:04; USC 10-7)

Second Quarter

- (11:59) USC - Cory Simms 52-yard pass from Jayden Maiava (Chaden Chittenden kick), (Drive: 6 plays, 75 yards, 3:05; USC 17-7)
- (1:25) Rutgers - Elias Coke 16-yard pass from Dylan Lonergan (Dane Pizzaro kick), (Drive: 14 plays, 95 yards, 6:35; USC 17-14)
- (0:10) USC - Chaden Chittenden 32-yard field goal (Drive: 8 plays, 61 yards, 1:15; USC 20-14)

Third Quarter

- (10:32) USC - Prophet Brown returns a 99-yard interception for a Touchdown (USC 27-14)
- (8:53) Rutgers - Clay Thevenin 17-yard rush (Dane Pizzaro kick), (Drive: 3 plays, 75 yards, 1:39; USC 27-21)
- (5:52) USC - Riley Wormley 12-yard rush (Jayden Maiava–Kayden Dixon-Wyatt pass), (Drive: 7 plays, 75 yards, 3:01; USC 35-21)
- (1:07) Rutgers - Antwan Raymond 2-yard rush (Dane Pizzaro kick), (Drive: 8 plays, 75 yards, 4:45; USC 35-28)

Fourth Quarter

- (8:35) USC - Riley Wormley 2-yard pass from Jayden Maiava (Chaden Chittenden kick), (Drive: 5 plays, 24 yards, 3:04; USC 42-28)
- (4:24) Rutgers - Vernon Allen II 28-yard pass from Dylan Lonergan (Dane Pizzaro kick), (Drive: 12 plays, 75 yards, 4:17; USC 42-35)

| Statistics | USC | RUTG |
|---|---|---|
| First downs | 24 | 27 |
| Plays–yards | 63–461 | 69–460 |
| Rushes–yards | 31–184 | 32–168 |
| Passing yards | 277 | 292 |
| Passing: comp–att–int | 20–32–0 | 19–37–2 |
| Turnovers | 0 | 2 |
| Time of possession | 26:45 | 33:15 |

| Team | Category | Player | Statistics |
|---|---|---|---|
| USC | Passing | Jayden Maiava | 20/32, 277 yards, 2 TD |
| USC | Rushing | King Miller | 16 carries, 102 yards, TD |
| USC | Receiving | Kayden Dixon-Wyatt | 5 receptions, 77 yards |
| Rutgers | Passing | Dylan Lonergan | 18/36, 252 yards, 3 TD, 2 INT |
| Rutgers | Rushing | Antwan Raymond | 21 carries, 122 yards, TD |
| Rutgers | Receiving | KJ Duff Jr. | 7 receptions, 86 yards, TD |

=== vs. Howard ===
Howard Bison (1–2) at Rutgers Scarlet Knights (0–3) – Game summary

| Quarter | 1 | 2 | 3 | 4 | Total |
|---|---|---|---|---|---|
| Bison (FCS) | 7 | 0 | 0 | 0 | 7 |
| Scarlet Knights | 21 | 20 | 10 | 7 | 58 |

at SHI Stadium • Piscataway, New Jersey

- Date: September 25
- Game time: 7:00 p.m. EST
- Game weather: Cloudy • Temperature: 69 °F (21 °C) • Wind: NE at 19 miles per hour (31 km/h)
- Game attendance: 34,466
- Referee: Mark Kluczynski
- TV announcers (BTN): Chris Vosters, Anthony Herron, and Dannie Rogers

| Statistics | HOW | RUTG |
|---|---|---|
| First downs | 9 | 29 |
| Plays–yards | 48–184 | 72–534 |
| Rushes–yards | 29–133 | 47–266 |
| Passing yards | 51 | 268 |
| Passing: comp–att–int | 8–19–2 | 16–25–0 |
| Turnovers | 3 | 0 |
| Time of possession | 23:16 | 36:44 |

| Team | Category | Player | Statistics |
|---|---|---|---|
| Howard | Passing | Ja'Shawn Scroggins | 5/14, 38 yards, 2 INT |
| Howard | Rushing | Eden James | 7 carries, 116 yards, TD |
| Howard | Receiving | Zaden Jackson | 4 receptions, 33 yards |
| Rutgers | Passing | Dylan Lonergan | 12/17, 214 yards, 2 TD |
| Rutgers | Rushing | Antwan Raymond | 16 carries, 140 yards, 3 TD |
| Rutgers | Receiving | KJ Duff | 5 receptions, 131 yards, TD |

=== vs. No. 6 Indiana ===
No. 6 Indiana Hoosiers (4–0) at Rutgers Scarlet Knights (1–3) – Game summary

| Quarter | 1 | 2 | 3 | 4 | Total |
|---|---|---|---|---|---|
| No. 6 Hoosiers | 0 | 0 | 0 | 0 | 0 |
| Scarlet Knights | 0 | 0 | 0 | 0 | 0 |

at SHI Stadium • Piscataway, New Jersey

- Date: October 3
- TV announcers (BTN): Mark Followill, Rhett Lewis, and Caroline Hendershot

| Statistics | IU | RUTG |
|---|---|---|
| First downs | | |
| Plays–yards | | |
| Rushes–yards | | |
| Passing yards | | |
| Passing: comp–att–int | | |
| Time of possession | | |

| Team | Category | Player | Statistics |
|---|---|---|---|
| Indiana | Passing | | |
| Indiana | Rushing | | |
| Indiana | Receiving | | |
| Rutgers | Passing | | |
| Rutgers | Rushing | | |
| Rutgers | Receiving | | |

=== at Maryland ===
Rutgers Scarlet Knights (1–4) at Maryland Terrapins (2–4) – Game summary

| Quarter | 1 | 2 | 3 | 4 | Total |
|---|---|---|---|---|---|
| Scarlet Knights | 7 | 6 | 10 | 14 | 37 |
| Terrapins | 7 | 16 | 0 | 7 | 30 |

at SECU Stadium • College Park, Maryland

- Date: October 17
- TV announcers (BTN): Wayne Randazzo, Jake Butt, and Brooke Fletcher

| Statistics | RUTG | MD |
|---|---|---|
| First downs | | |
| Plays–yards | | |
| Rushes–yards | | |
| Passing yards | | |
| Passing: comp–att–int | | |
| Time of possession | | |

| Team | Category | Player | Statistics |
|---|---|---|---|
| Rutgers | Passing | | |
| Rutgers | Rushing | | |
| Rutgers | Receiving | | |
| Maryland | Passing | | |
| Maryland | Rushing | | |
| Maryland | Receiving | | |

=== at No. 24 Northwestern ===
Rutgers Scarlet Knights (2–4) at No. 24 Northwestern Wildcats (5–1) – Game summary

| Quarter | 1 | 2 | 3 | 4 | Total |
|---|---|---|---|---|---|
| Scarlet Knights | 0 | 0 | 0 | 0 | 0 |
| No. 24 Wildcats | 0 | 0 | 0 | 0 | 0 |

at Ryan Field • Evanston, Illinois

- Date: October 24
- TV announcers (Peacock): Paul Burmeister, Yogi Roth, and Caroline Pineda

| Statistics | RUTG | NU |
|---|---|---|
| First downs | | |
| Plays–yards | | |
| Rushes–yards | | |
| Passing yards | | |
| Passing: comp–att–int | | |
| Time of possession | | |

| Team | Category | Player | Statistics |
|---|---|---|---|
| Rutgers | Passing | | |
| Rutgers | Rushing | | |
| Rutgers | Receiving | | |
| Northwestern | Passing | | |
| Northwestern | Rushing | | |
| Northwestern | Receiving | | |

=== vs. Michigan ===
Michigan Wolverines (4–3) at Rutgers Scarlet Knights (2–5) – Game summary

| Quarter | 1 | 2 | 3 | 4 | Total |
|---|---|---|---|---|---|
| Wolverines | 0 | 0 | 0 | 0 | 0 |
| Scarlet Knights | 0 | 0 | 0 | 0 | 0 |

at SHI Stadium • Piscataway, New Jersey

- Date: October 31

| Statistics | MICH | RUTG |
|---|---|---|
| First downs | | |
| Plays–yards | | |
| Rushes–yards | | |
| Passing yards | | |
| Passing: comp–att–int | | |
| Time of possession | | |

| Team | Category | Player | Statistics |
|---|---|---|---|
| Michigan | Passing | | |
| Michigan | Rushing | | |
| Michigan | Receiving | | |
| Rutgers | Passing | | |
| Rutgers | Rushing | | |
| Rutgers | Receiving | | |

=== at Wisconsin ===
Rutgers Scarlet Knights (2–6) at Wisconsin Badgers (5–3) – Game summary

| Quarter | 1 | 2 | 3 | 4 | Total |
|---|---|---|---|---|---|
| Scarlet Knights | 0 | 0 | 0 | 0 | 0 |
| Badgers | 0 | 0 | 0 | 0 | 0 |

at Camp Randall Stadium • Madison, Wisconsin

- Date: November 7

| Statistics | RUTG | WIS |
|---|---|---|
| First downs | | |
| Plays–yards | | |
| Rushes–yards | | |
| Passing yards | | |
| Passing: comp–att–int | | |
| Time of possession | | |

| Team | Category | Player | Statistics |
|---|---|---|---|
| Rutgers | Passing | | |
| Rutgers | Rushing | | |
| Rutgers | Receiving | | |
| Wisconsin | Passing | | |
| Wisconsin | Rushing | | |
| Wisconsin | Receiving | | |

=== vs. Nebraska ===
Nebraska Cornhuskers (5–4) at Rutgers Scarlet Knights (2–7) – Game summary

| Quarter | 1 | 2 | 3 | 4 | Total |
|---|---|---|---|---|---|
| Cornhuskers | 0 | 0 | 0 | 0 | 0 |
| Scarlet Knights | 0 | 0 | 0 | 0 | 0 |

at SHI Stadium • Piscataway, New Jersey

- Date: November 14

| Statistics | NEB | RUTG |
|---|---|---|
| First downs | | |
| Plays–yards | | |
| Rushes–yards | | |
| Passing yards | | |
| Passing: comp–att–int | | |
| Time of possession | | |

| Team | Category | Player | Statistics |
|---|---|---|---|
| Nebraska | Passing | | |
| Nebraska | Rushing | | |
| Nebraska | Receiving | | |
| Rutgers | Passing | | |
| Rutgers | Rushing | | |
| Rutgers | Receiving | | |

=== at Penn State ===
Rutgers Scarlet Knights (2–8) at Penn State Nittany Lions (6–4) – Game summary

| Quarter | 1 | 2 | 3 | 4 | Total |
|---|---|---|---|---|---|
| Scarlet Knights | 0 | 10 | 0 | 15 | 25 |
| Nittany Lions | 9 | 7 | 8 | 0 | 24 |

at Beaver Stadium • University Park, Pennsylvania

- Date: November 21
- Game time: 3:30 p.m. EST
- Game weather: 61 °F (16 °C) • partly sunny
- Game attendance: 106,200
- Referee: Bryan Banks
- TV announcers (FS1): Noah Reed (play-by-play) and Petros Papadakis (analyst)
- ESPN box score

Game information

First quarter

- PSU – Cam Wallace, 56-yard TD run, Ryan Barker kick, 10:22 (7–0 PSU)
- PSU – Safety, Clay Thevenin tackled in end zone, 0:00 (9–0 PSU)

Second quarter

- PSU – Chase Sowell, 17-yard TD pass from Rocco Becht, Barker kick, 5:14 (16–0 PSU)
- RU – Antwan Raymond, 5-yard TD run, Jack Scullion kick, 1:55 (16–7 PSU)
- RU – Scullion, 20-yard field goal, 0:15 (16–10 PSU)

Third quarter

- PSU – Becht, 6-yard TD run, Benjamin Brahmer 2-point conversion pass reception from Becht, 4:57 (24–10 PSU)

Fourth quarter

- RU – Raymond, 13-yard TD run, Scullion kick, 10:19 (24–17 PSU)
- RU – Ben Black, 3-yard TD run, AJ Surace 2-yard pass to Raymond, lateral to Black, Thevenin 2-point conversion pass reception from Surace, 0:00 (25–24 RU)

| Statistics | RUTG | PSU |
|---|---|---|
| First downs | 20 | 15 |
| Plays–yards | 72–263 | 56–383 |
| Rushes–yards | 33–85 | 35–150 |
| Passing yards | 178 | 233 |
| Passing: comp–att–int | 24–39–0 | 14–21–0 |
| Turnovers | 0 | 2 |
| Time of possession | 30:22 | 29:38 |

| Team | Category | Player | Statistics |
|---|---|---|---|
| Rutgers | Passing | AJ Surace | 24/39, 178 yards, TD |
| Rutgers | Rushing | Antwan Raymond | 23 carries, 101 yards, 2 TD |
| Rutgers | Receiving | Logan Blake | 5 receptions, 40 yards |
| Penn State | Passing | Rocco Becht | 14/21, 233 yards, TD |
| Penn State | Rushing | Cam Wallace | 16 carries, 95 yards, TD |
| Penn State | Receiving | Chase Sowell | 6 receptions, 123 yards, TD |

=== vs. Michigan State ===
Michigan State Spartans (3–8) at Rutgers Scarlet Knights (3–8) – Game summary

| Quarter | 1 | 2 | 3 | 4 | Total |
|---|---|---|---|---|---|
| Spartans | 0 | 0 | 0 | 0 | 0 |
| Scarlet Knights | 0 | 0 | 0 | 0 | 0 |

at SHI Stadium • Piscataway, New Jersey

- Date: November 28

| Statistics | MSU | RUTG |
|---|---|---|
| First downs | | |
| Plays–yards | | |
| Rushes–yards | | |
| Passing yards | | |
| Passing: comp–att–int | | |
| Time of possession | | |

| Team | Category | Player | Statistics |
|---|---|---|---|
| Michigan State | Passing | | |
| Michigan State | Rushing | | |
| Michigan State | Receiving | | |
| Rutgers | Passing | | |
| Rutgers | Rushing | | |
| Rutgers | Receiving | | |

== Personnel ==
2026 Rutgers Scarlet Knights football team roster
Players
Coaches
Offense

| Pos. | # | Name | Class |
|---|---|---|---|
| WR | 0 | Dyzier Carter | Fr |
| WR | 1 | Famah Toure | Sr |
| WR | 2 | Ben Black | Jr |
| RB | 3 | Antwan Raymond | Jr |
| WR | 4 | Jourdin Houston | So |
| WR | 5 | Vernon Allen III | So |
| QB | 6 | Sean Ashenfelder | So |
| WR | 7 | Dylan Braithwaite | Sr |
| WR | 8 | K. J. Duff | Jr |
| RB | 9 | Clay Thevenin | Sr |
| QB | 10 | A. J. Surace | Jr |
| TE | 11 | Logan Blake | Sr |
| QB | 12 | Dylan Lonergan | Sr |
| WR | 13 | Elias Coke | Fr |
| WR | 14 | Sah'nye Degraffenreidt | So |
| QB | 15 | Rocco Rainone | Jr |
| QB | 17 | Xavier Stearn | Fr |
| RB | 20 | Ja'Shon Benjamin | Sr |
| RB | 22 | Michael Dukes III | Fr |
| RB | 23 | Edd Guerrier | Jr |
| TE | 24 | Ben Rothhaar | So |
| WR | 25 | Trent Osborn | Jr |
| RB | 26 | Terrell Mitchell | So |
| RB | 28 | Xavier Williams | So |
| WR | 39 | Salomon Ealey | So |
| OL | 51 | Raymond Giacobbe | Jr |
| OL | 53 | Hank Zilinskas | Sr |
| OL | 54 | Everett Small | Jr |
| OL | 55 | Nick Oliveira | Sr |
| OL | 56 | Tyler Needham | Sr |
| OL | 57 | Isaiah Cook | Sr |
| OL | 58 | Joseph Lakatos | Jr |
| OL | 60 | Logan Anthony | Fr |
| OL | 61 | Emir Stinette | Sr |
| OL | 62 | Tyler Duell | Fr |
| OL | 64 | Joshua Blackston | So |
| OL | 66 | Donovan Johnson | Fr |
| OL | 67 | Chris Vigna | So |
| OL | 68 | Ryder Langsdale | Sr |
| OL | 69 | Kwabena Asamoah | Sr |
| OL | 70 | Cameron Greene | Fr |
| OL | 71 | Jared Smith | Fr |
| OL | 72 | Jayden Elijah | So |
| OL | 73 | Terrence Salami | Sr |
| OL | 74 | Moshood Giwa | Sr |
| OL | 75 | Raynor Andrews | Jr |
| OL | 76 | Dantae Chin | Sr |
| OL | 77 | Kenny Jones | Jr |
| OL | 78 | Miron Gurman | So |
| OL | 79 | Justin Cesaire | Sr |
| WR | 80 | Michael Thomas III | So |
| TE | 81 | D. J. Howerton | Fr |
| TE | 82 | Jackson Gister | Jr |
| WR | 83 | Dino Kaliakmanis | GS |
| TE | 84 | Ryan Bayoumy | So |
| TE | 85 | Kameron Anthony | Jr |
| TE | 88 | Mike Higgins | Sr |
| TE | 89 | Brady Owens | Fr |

Defense

| Pos. | # | Name | Class |
|---|---|---|---|
| DL | 0 | Doug Blue-Eli | Sr |
| DB | 1 | Kaj Sanders | Jr |
| LB | 2 | Moses Walker | Sr |
| DB | 3 | Latrell Noel | So |
| DB | 4 | Kevyn Humes | Jr |
| DB | 5 | Bradlee Jones | Sr |
| LB | 6 | Abram Wright | Sr |
| DB | 7 | Kevin Levy | Jr |
| DL | 8 | Wydeek Collier-Johnson | So |
| DB | 9 | D. K. Gilley | Jr |
| LB | 10 | Ty Morris | Sr |
| DL | 11 | Malachi Davis | Sr |
| DB | 12 | Zahmir Dawud | Sr |
| LB | 13 | D. J. McClary | So |
| DL | 14 | R. J. Johnson Jr. | So |
| DB | 15 | Zilan Williams | Sr |
| DB | 16 | Jesse Ofurie | Sr |
| LB | 17 | M. J. Johnson | Jr |
| DB | 18 | Messiah Tilson | Fr |
| DB | 19 | Davoun Fuse | Sr |
| DB | 20 | Chris Jones | Sr |
| DB | 21 | Devonte Anderson | Fr |
| DB | 22 | Michael Clayton | So |
| LB | 23 | Isaiah Deloatch | So |
| DB | 24 | Steven Murray | So |
| DB | 25 | Jamareis Conyers | Fr |
| DB | 26 | Isaiah Crumpler | Jr |
| DB | 27 | Sage Clawges | Sr |
| DB | 28 | Cannon Marshall | So |
| DB | 29 | Sebastian Jusma | Sr |
| DL | 30 | Elijah King | Jr |
| DB | 31 | Sebastian Cruz | Fr |
| DB | 32 | Brandon Murray | Fr |
| LB | 33 | John Insinga | So |
| DB | 34 | Noah Shaw | Jr |
| LB | 36 | Kamar Archie | So |
| DB | 37 | R. J. Wortman | Fr |
| LB | 38 | Joey Kopec | Fr |
| DL | 42 | D. J. Allen | Sr |
| DB | 44 | Tariq Hayer | So |
| DB | 45 | Shawn Purcell | Sr |
| DL | 47 | Canaan Edwards | So |
| DL | 48 | Raedyn Bruens | So |
| LB | 50 | Joe Nwachukwu | Jr |
| DL | 55 | Zaire Angoy | Sr |
| DL | 56 | Anthony Morales | Jr |
| LB | 59 | Liam Gilmore | Jr |
| DL | 87 | Monte Keener | Jr |
| DL | 88 | Jyon Simon | So |
| DL | 90 | Farell Gnago | Jr |
| DL | 91 | Jaedin Lee | Jr |
| DL | 92 | Jermaine Polk | Fr |
| DL | 93 | Reece Beck | Fr |
| DL | 94 | J'Dan Burnett | Sr |
| DL | 95 | Henry Hughes Jr. | Sr |
| DL | 96 | Keshon Griffin | Sr |
| DL | 97 | Rinaldo Callaway III | Fr |
| DL | 98 | Braxton Kyle | So |
| DL | 99 | Rondo Porter | Sr |

Special teams

| Pos. | # | Name | Class |
|---|---|---|---|
| K | 21 | Riley McCann | Sr |
| K | 29 | Dane Pizzaro | Jr |
| K | 44 | Jai Patel | Sr |
| LS | 46 | Sammy El Hadidi | Sr |
| LS | 49 | Evan Ward | Sr |
| LS | 68 | Matthew Murri | Sr |
| K | 93 | Jack Scullion | Jr |
| P | 94 | Jakob Anderson | Jr |
| LS | 99 | Michael O'Connor | Sr |

Head coach

- Greg Schiano

Coordinators/assistant coaches

- Kirk Ciarrocca – Offensive coordinator/quarterbacks
- Travis Johansen – Defensive coordinator
- Dennis Dottin-Carter – Defense linemen
- Joe Woodley – Rush ends
- Eric Finney – Cornerbacks
- Adam Cox – Safeties
- Elijah Hodge – Linebackers
- Charlie Noonan – Studs
- Luke Carrezola – Defensive tackles
- Damiere Shaw – Associate offensive coordinator/running backs
- Dave Brock – Wide receivers
- Scott Vallone – Tight ends
- Jim Turner – Offensive linemen
- Bob Fraser – Senior offensive assistant
- Eddie Allen – Special teams coordinator
- Spencer Brown – Director, sports performance

Legend

- (C) Team captain
- (S) Suspended
- (I) Ineligible
- Injured
- Redshirt

Roster
Last update: 06/08/26
