= Ed Foley =

American football player and coach (born 1967)

Nebraska Cornhuskers
- Title: Special teams coordinator

Personal information
- Born: September 26, 1967 (age 59); Cherry Hill, New Jersey, U.S.

Career history
- Albany (1989–1990) Offensive line coach; Penn (1991–1993) Tight ends coach & offensive tackles coach; Williams (1994) Offensive line coach; Penn (1995–1997) Tight ends coach & offensive tackles coach; Jacksonville (1998) Offensive coordinator; Fordham (1999–2003) Offensive coordinator & offensive line coach; Fordham (2004–2005) Head coach; Hofstra (2006) Assistant head coach & offensive line coach; Hofstra (2007) Assistant head coach, offensive coordinator, & offensive line coach; Temple (2008–2010) Tight ends and offensive line coach; Temple (2011–2012) Director of operations; Temple (2013–2016) Assistant head coach, special teams coordinator and tight ends coach; Temple (2016) Interim Head Coach; Temple (2017) Special teams coordinator and tight ends coach; Temple (2018) Assistant head coach, special teams coordinator and tight ends coach; Temple (2018) Interim Head Coach; Baylor (2019) Analyst; Carolina Panthers (2020–2022) Assistant special teams coordinator; Nebraska (2023–2024) Special teams coordinator

Head coaching record
- Career: 7–17

Edward Charles Foley Jr. (born September 26, 1967) is an American football coach and former player. He was the assistant special teams coach for the Carolina Panthers from 2020 until mid-2022, working under head coach Matt Rhule, who he had previously worked with at Temple University. Prior to coaching the Panthers, Foley primarily coached college football, including head coach positions at Fordham University and Temple University.

== Early life ==
Raised in Cherry Hill, New Jersey, Foley graduated from Cherry Hill High School East.

Foley was a three-year starter at Bucknell University, playing one season as a guard and two as a center. During his junior year, he was named the Bison's top lineman. As a senior, he served as the team's captain.

== Coaching career ==
=== Early coaching career ===
Foley coached the offensive line at University at Albany, SUNY from 1989 to 1990. He served as an assistant coach at the University of Pennsylvania from 1991 to 1993, and again from 1995 to 1997. At Penn, Foley coached tight ends and tackles for five years and helped the Quakers to a perfect 10–0 record and an Ivy League championship in 1993. Foley was the offensive line coach for Williams College in 1994. Foley spent the 1998 season as the offensive coordinator and offensive line coach at Jacksonville University, the first time the university sponsored football. His Dolphin offense averaged 380 passing yards (190 passing, 190 rushing) and 30.1 points per game.

=== Fordham ===
Foley coached the Fordham Rams for seven seasons, including two seasons as head coach. As Fordham's offensive coordinator and offensive line coach, Foley helped rejuvenate a program that won the Patriot League championship in 2002 with a 10–3 record.

In 2000, Foley's offense established a running game that set a team record for most rushing yards in a single (1,635 yards, an average of 149 per game). In 2001, the Fordham offense had its first 1,000-yard rusher and first-ever 1,000-yard receiver on the NCAA Division I-AA level. That year Rams had the second-ranked passing offense in the Patriot League and the second-best scoring offense as well.

In 2002, Fordham led the Patriot League in passing and scoring offense, while finishing second in total offense, and setting a team record for most points in a season. In addition to winning the Patriot League title, the Rams advanced to the NCAA I-AA Playoffs, where they defeated the Northeastern Huskies in the first round.

In 2003, six members of the Rams offense were named to the All-Patriot League Team, including four whom were named to the first team. The Rams broke the team record for most rushing yards in a season for the second time in Foley's tenure (1,657 yards), while also setting a school record for most pass completions in a season (255).

As head coach, Foley had a 7–15 record over two seasons with a 4–8 conference record. Foley's short tenure as head coach was due to his poor record and not endearing himself to his players.

=== Hofstra ===
Foley spent three seasons at Hofstra University as the assistant head coach, offensive coordinator, and offensive line coach. In his first year as coordinator, the team's total yardage increased from 269 to 388 yards per game and from 16.8 to 26.9 points per game. Foley also brought balance to the Pride attack as Hofstra's rushing total was its highest since 2000 (145 yards/game) and its passing attack netted 243 yards per contest.

=== Temple ===
In 2008, Foley joined the Temple coaching staff as the recruiting coordinator, tight ends coach, and assistant offensive line coach. On December 6, 2016, it was announced that Foley will act as interim head coach for Temple at the Military Bowl on December 27, after Matt Rhule was announced to be the new head coach for Baylor. Foley coached Temple in the 2016 Military Bowl. Following the Military Bowl, Foley was retained by Geoff Collins as Temple's tight ends coach. In 2018, Foley was promoted to assistant head coach of offense. On December 7, 2018, Foley was once again named interim head coach of Temple for the 2018 Independence Bowl on December 27, after Collins left for the head coaching job at Georgia Tech.

=== Carolina Panthers ===
In 2020 Foley was hired as the assistant special teams coach for the Carolina Panthers under head coach Matt Rhule. The Panthers dismissed Foley from the team on October 10, 2022, following the dismissal of Rhule after the 5th game of their 2022 season.

=== Nebraska ===
In 2022, Foley joined the Nebraska Cornhuskers coaching staff as the special teams coordinator and assistant offensive line coach.

== Personal ==
Foley is married and has three children. His brother, Glenn Foley, played as a quarterback in the National Football League (NFL) from 1994 to 1999. His father, Ed Sr., was a quarterback at Boston College from 1963 to 1965.

== Head coaching record ==
Year	Team	Overall	Conference	Standing	Bowl/playoffs
Fordham Rams (Patriot League) (2004–2005)
2004	Fordham	5–6	2–4	5th	
2005	Fordham	2–9	2–4	T–5th	
Fordham:		7–15	4–8		
Temple Owls (American Athletic Conference) (2016)
2016	Temple	0–1 (Note: Foley coached the 2016 Military Bowl after head coach Matt Rhule resigned to become the head coach at Baylor.)	0–0	1st	L Military Bowl
Temple Owls (American Athletic Conference) (2018)
2018	Temple	0–1 (Note: Foley coached the 2018 Independence Bowl after head coach Geoff Collins resigned to become the head coach at Georgia Tech.)	0–0	2nd	L Independence Bowl
Temple:		0–2	0–0		
Total:		7–17			
