= AJ Surace =

American football player

No. 10 – Rutgers Scarlet Knights
- Position: Quarterback
- Class: Junior

Personal information
- Listed height: 6 ft 2 in (1.88 m)
- Listed weight: 210 lb (95 kg)

Career information
- High school: Notre Dame (Lawrenceville, New Jersey)
- College: Rutgers (2024–present)
- Stats at ESPN

Anthony James Surace is an American college football quarterback for the Rutgers Scarlet Knights.

== Early life ==
Surace grew up in Pennington, New Jersey, and attended Notre Dame High School in Lawrenceville, New Jersey. He was rated as a three-star recruit, the 32nd overall quarterback, and the 9th overall player in the state of New Jersey, and committed to play college football for the Rutgers Scarlet Knights over offers from other schools such as Boston College, Duke, Indiana, Michigan State, Northwestern, Pittsburgh, Temple, and Tennessee.

== College career ==
As a freshman in 2024, Surace was redshirted. He entered the 2025 season as the backup quarterback behind Athan Kaliakmanis. Surace made his collegiate debut in week 3 of the 2025 season, where he completed four of seven pass attempts for 58 yards and two touchdowns in a win over Norfolk State. On the season, he completed four of nine pass attempts for 58 yards and two touchdowns. Surace entered the 2026 season competing with Dylan Lonergan for the starting job.

=== Statistics ===
Year	Team	Games			Passing								Rushing			
Year	Team	GP	GS	Record	Cmp	Att	Pct	Yds	Y/A	TD	Int	Rtg	Att	Yds	Avg	TD
2024	Rutgers	0	0	—	Redshirted (redshirt)											
2025	Rutgers	3	0	—	4	9	44.4	58	6.4	2	0	171.9	2	–5	–2.5	0
2026	Rutgers	5	1	0–1	40	71	56.3	539	7.6	6	5	134.0	19	–56	–2.9	0
Career		8	1	0–1	44	80	55.0	597	7.5	8	5	138.2	21	–61	–2.9	0

== Personal life ==
Surace is the son of Princeton head football coach, Bob Surace.
