= 2018 Independence Bowl =

College football bowl game

2018 Walk-On's Independence Bowl
- 43rd Independence Bowl
Temple Owls	Duke Blue Devils
(8–4)	(7–5)
The American	ACC
27	56
Head coach: Ed Foley (interim)	Head coach: David Cutcliffe
	1	2	3	4	Total
Temple	13	14	0	0	27
Duke	7	14	21	14	56
- Date: December 27, 2018
- Season: 2018
- Stadium: Independence Stadium
- Location: Shreveport, Louisiana
- MVP: Daniel Jones (QB, Duke) & Delvon Randall (DB, Temple)
- Favorite: Temple by 3
- Referee: Mark Kluczynski (Big Ten)
- Attendance: 27,492
- Payout: US$1,248,000

United States TV coverage
- Network: ESPN
- Announcers: Mike Couzens, Kirk Morrison and Lauren Sisler

The 2018 Independence Bowl was a college football bowl game played on December 27, 2018. It was the 43rd edition of the Independence Bowl, and one of the 2018–19 bowl games concluding the 2018 FBS football season. Sponsored by Walk-On's Bistreaux & Bar, the game was officially known as the Walk-On's Independence Bowl.

== Teams ==
The bowl has conference tie-ins with the Southeastern Conference (SEC) and Atlantic Coast Conference (ACC). However, as four SEC teams were selected for New Year's Six games, bowl organizers announced a matchup of Temple of the American Athletic Conference (The American), rather than an SEC team, and Duke of the ACC. This was the first meeting between Duke and Temple.

=== Temple Owls ===
Temple received and accepted a bid to the Independence Bowl on December 2. The Owls entered the bowl with an 8–4 record (7–1 in conference), having won 6-of-7 to end their regular season. As Temple head coach Geoff Collins resigned in order to take the same position at Georgia Tech, the Owls were led in the Independence Bowl by interim head coach Ed Foley.

=== Duke Blue Devils ===
Duke received and accepted a bid to the Independence Bowl on December 2. The Blue Devils entered the bowl with a 7–5 record (3–5 in conference), having lost 4-of-6 to end their regular season.

== Game summary ==
=== Scoring summary ===
Scoring summary

Quarter	Time	Drive			Team	Scoring information	Score	
Quarter	Time	Plays	Yards	TOP	Team	Scoring information	TEM	DUKE
1	10:36	6	77	2:29	DUKE	Quentin Harris 2-yard touchdown run, Collin Wareham kick good	0	7
1	8:43	5	26	1:53	TEM	Anthony Russo 15-yard touchdown run, Will Mobley kick good	7	7
1	5:42	8	32	3:01	TEM	Interception returned 52 yards for touchdown by Delvon Randall, Will Mobley kick no good (miss left)	13	7
2	10:25	10	58	3:13	TEM	Rob Ritrovato 1-yard touchdown run, Will Mobley kick good	20	7
2	7:42	7	70	2:43	DUKE	Chris Taylor 34-yard touchdown reception from Daniel Jones, Collin Wareham kick good	20	14
2	4:26	9	79	3:16	TEM	Brodrick Yancy 8-yard touchdown reception from Anthony Russo, Will Mobley kick good	27	14
2	1:11	10	75	3:15	DUKE	T. J. Rahming 22-yard touchdown reception from Daniel Jones, Collin Wareham kick good	27	21
3	11:06	9	59	3:54	DUKE	Daniel Jones 2-yard touchdown run, Collin Wareham kick good	27	28
3	7:28	2	83	0:45	DUKE	T. J. Rahming 85-yard touchdown reception from Daniel Jones, Collin Wareham kick good	27	35
3	2:49	9	68	3:01	DUKE	Jake Bobo 7-yard touchdown reception from Daniel Jones, Collin Wareham kick good	27	42
4	14:55	3	10	1:22	DUKE	Brittain Brown 4-yard touchdown run, Collin Wareham kick good	27	49
4	13:12	7	43	2:56	DUKE	Davis Koppenhaver 4-yard touchdown reception from Daniel Jones, Collin Wareham kick good	27	56
"TOP" = time of possession. For other American football terms, see Glossary of American football.							27	56

=== Statistics ===
	1	2	3	4	Total
Owls	13	14	0	0	27
Blue Devils	7	14	21	14	56

Statistics	TEM	DUKE
First downs	19	22
Plays–yards	75–281	83–563
Rushes–yards	29–53	39–123
Passing yards	228	440
Passing: comp–att–int	25–46–1	32–44–3
Time of possession	25:53	34:07

Team	Category	Player	Statistics
Temple	Passing	Anthony Russo	25/46, 228 yds, 1 TD, 1 INT
Temple	Rushing	Jager Gardner	7 car, 34 yds
Temple	Receiving	Brodrick Yancy	5 rec, 57 yds, 1 TD
Duke	Passing	Daniel Jones	30/41, 423 yds, 5 TD, 2 INT
Duke	Rushing	Deon Jackson	10 car, 41 yds
Duke	Receiving	T. J. Rahming	12 rec, 240 yds, 2 TD
