= Scott Mutryn =

American football player (born 1975)

Profile
- Position: Quarterback

Personal information
- Born: September 10, 1975 (age 51); Garfield Heights, Ohio, U.S.

Career information
- High school: St. Ignatius (Cleveland, Ohio)
- College: Boston College

Career history
- 1999: New England Patriots *
- 2000: Amsterdam Admirals

Scott Mutryn (born September 10, 1975) is an American former professional football quarterback for the New England Patriots and Amsterdam Admirals.

A top recruit out of Saint Ignatius High School in Cleveland, Ohio, Mutryn played behind Mark Hartsell as a true freshman in 1994, but was redshirted in 1995 so he could compete with junior Matt Hasselbeck for the starting job in 1996. Mutryn won the job, but was replaced by Hasselbeck during the season. After splitting playing time with Hasselbeck in 1996, new head coach Tom O'Brien decided that Hasselbeck should be the team's only quarterback in 1997 and Mutryn spent the season on the bench. Mutryn started during his final season at Boston College, passing for 2,218 yards and 12 touchdowns for the 4–7 Eagles. Mutryn finished 10th in total career yardage (3,261), 6th overall in single season yardage (2,298 in 1998), 8th overall in passing yards (3,119), 9th overall in single season passing yards (2,218 in 1998), 7th in career passing attempts, 6th in career completion percentage (55.1%), and 8th in single season completion percentage (59.8%).

In 1999, Mutryn was signed by the New England Patriots as an undrafted free agent. He competed against Drew Bledsoe, John Friesz, and Michael Bishop during the pre-season for a spot on the team. He threw one touchdown pass in practice, but did not make the final roster. Mutryn was signed by the Amsterdam Admirals on March 21, 2000 to replace the injured Jim Murphy. He was cut by the team on April 2, 2000.

== Personal life ==
Mutryn's sons, Teddy and Casey, are both ice hockey players.
