= John Amabile (American football) =

American football player, scout, and coach (1939–2012)

Personal information
- Born: April 16, 1939
- Died: April 22, 2012 (aged 73) Neptune Township, New Jersey, U.S.
- Occupations: Scout, coach
- Employers: Lincoln HS (1967); Belleville High School; Middletown HS (1970-1974); Wall HS (1977-1984); Neptune HS (1985-2000); St. John Vianney (2003-2008); Long Branch HS (2011)

Sport
- Sport: American football
- Position: Quarterback
- University team: Boston College
- Team: Jersey Giants (1964)

John Amabile (April 16, 1939 – April 22, 2012) was an American professional football scout for the New York Giants, high school football coach, and college football quarterback.

== Playing career ==
Amabile played quarterback for the Boston College Eagles from 1958 to 1960. He finished his career completing 163 of 329 passes (49.8%) for 2321 yards, 17 touchdowns, and 18 interceptions. He won the 1960 Thomas F. Scanlan Memorial Trophy, an award given to the senior football player outstanding in scholarship, leadership, and athletic ability. He played for the Jersey Giants of the Atlantic Coast Football League in 1964.

== Coaching career ==
Amabile launched his career at Lincoln High School in 1967. He coached at Belleville High School and then From there he moved to Middletown High School, where he coached from 1970 to 1974.

From 1977 to 1984, he coached Wall High School. He led the Crimson Knights to consecutive 11–0 seasons and NJSIAA Central Jersey Group III championships in 1982 and 1983. His teams won four straight Shore Conference divisional titles from 1981 to 1984.

Amabile coached at Neptune High School from 1985 to 2000. From 1993 to 1999, the Scarlet Fliers had a 33-game home winning streak. From 1994 to 1998, Neptune won five straight Shore Conference divisional titles, going unbeaten in 1995 and 1997.

From 2003 to 2008, Amabile coached St. John Vianney. In his six seasons with the Lancers, Amabile had a 22–38 record, with only one winning season and playoff appearance. In 2009, he coached Allentown High School.

Amabile compiled an overall record of 252–172–11. Only Warren Wolf, Lou Vircillo and Vic Kubu are believed to have more wins in the Shore Conference.

In 2011, Amabile was the offensive coordinator at Long Branch High School.

== Scouting ==
Amabile scouted for the New York Giants from 2002 to 2011.

== Death ==
Amabile died on April 22, 2012, at the age of 73 at Jersey Shore University Medical Center. He was a resident of Spring Lake Heights, New Jersey, having lived there since 1968.
