= Frank Power (basketball) =

American basketball coach

Biographical details
- Born: September 1, 1920
- Died: June 4, 1984 (aged 63); Athy, Ireland

Coaching career (HC unless noted)
- 1952-1973: Boston College (Freshman)
- 1962-1963: Boston College
- 1963-1985: Boston College (Asst. Coach)

Head coaching record
- Overall: 10-16

Francis G. "Frank" Power, Jr. (September 1, 1920 – June 4, 1985) was a longtime assistant coach for the Boston College Eagles men's basketball team and employee of the Boston Public School system.

== Early life ==
Power was born and raised in the Mission Hill neighborhood in Boston, Massachusetts. He attended Mission High School and Boston College. He served on the USS Bataan during the Second World War. After the war, Power worked for as a director of veterans services for the Commonwealth of Massachusetts.

== Boston College ==
Power spent twenty years as the freshman basketball coach at Boston College. He became the team's interim head coach in 1962 while the school's head coach Bob Cousy played his final season with the Boston Celtics. Following the NCAA's decision to allow freshmen to play on varsity teams, Power served as an assistant coach.

For his contributions to Boston College Basketball, Power was inducted into the Boston College Varsity Club Athletic Hall of Fame in 1975.

Following his death, the school named the auxiliary basketball arena after Power. Also named after Power is the Frank Power Award, an annual award given the Boston College player "who exemplifies the spirit and love for Boston College that was characteristic of coach Power".

In addition to coaching college basketball, Power was also a college football official for 25 years.

== Boston public schools ==
Power was the head basketball and football coach of Mission High School in Roxbury, Massachusetts, during the 1940s and 50s. He briefly coached football and basketball at St. Sebastian's High School in Newton, Massachusetts, before returning to Mission High.

Power worked as a guidance councilor at Boston Technical High School and assistant headmaster at English High School of Boston. He was the headmaster at Charlestown High School during the school's busing crisis. Power stepped down as CHS headmaster in 1975. He later held the same position at the Occupational Resource Center and the Boston Business School.

== Personal ==
Power's cousin, Mike Power was a quarterback at Boston College from 1986 to 1989.

== Death ==
Power suffered a massive coronary while teaching basketball to a group of students and died on June 4, 1985, in Athy, Ireland.
