= Glenn Foley =

American football player (born 1970)

No. 14, 4, 13
- Position: Quarterback

Personal information
- Born: October 10, 1970 (age 56); Woburn, Massachusetts, U.S.
- Listed height: 6 ft 1 in (1.85 m)
- Listed weight: 212 lb (96 kg)

Career information
- High school: Cherry Hill East (Cherry Hill, New Jersey)
- College: Boston College
- NFL draft: 1994: 7th round, 208th overall pick

Career history
- New York Jets (1994–1998); Seattle Seahawks (1999); New Jersey Gladiators (2002)

Career NFL statistics
- Passing attempts: 382
- Passing completions: 207
- Completion percentage: 54.2%
- TD–INT: 12–16
- Passing yards: 2,469
- Passer rating: 67.2
- Stats at Pro Football Reference
- Stats at ArenaFan.com

Glenn Edward Foley (born October 10, 1970) is an American former professional football player who was a quarterback in the National Football League (NFL). He played college football for the Boston College Eagles. He played in the NFL with the New York Jets from 1994 to 1998 and the Seattle Seahawks in 1999 and in the Arena Football League (AFL) with the New Jersey Gladiators in 2002.

== Early life ==
Foley played high school football at Cherry Hill High School East in his hometown of Cherry Hill, New Jersey.

== Boston College ==
Foley attended Boston College and played for the Boston College Eagles football team. In 1993, he led the Eagles in a 41–39 upset over previously undefeated Notre Dame and a victory over Virginia Cavaliers in the 1994 Carquest Bowl. To finish the season, he received 180 votes for the Heisman Trophy, finishing in fifth place.

- 1990: 182/349 for 2,189 yards with 11 touchdowns and 21 interceptions
- 1991: 153/298 for 2,222 yards with 21 touchdowns and 17 interceptions
- 1992: 146/265 for 2,231 yards with 15 touchdowns and 12 interceptions
- 1993: 222/363 for 3,397 yards with 25 touchdowns and 10 interceptions

== NFL career ==
Entering the 1994 NFL draft Foley worked out for almost all the teams in the NFL at the February scouting combine in Indianapolis.

Before the draft, Foley was rated by Miami Herald sports writer Alex Marvez and by Charles Bricker of the Fort Lauderdale Sun-Sentinel as the draft's third-best quarterback behind Heath Shuler and Trent Dilfer. NFL analyst Mel Kiper also rated Foley as the third-best quarterback in the draft, whilst The Californian rated him fourth behind Shuler, Dilfer, and Idaho’s Doug Nussmeier. Jim Thomas of the St. Louis Post-Dispatch, however, did not rate Foley among the five best quarterbacks available. Those who had played against Foley in college had doubts about his size, durability, and consistency as a short passer, and Bricker said that Foley would not be chosen before the fourth round.

Foley was ultimately selected in the seventh round of the draft and played sporadically for the Jets from 1994 to 1998. From 1996 to 1998 he threw for 2,013 yards with 10 touchdowns and 14 interceptions during that three-season span. Foley was the Jets' starting quarterback to open the 1998 season and threw for 415 yards in an overtime Week 1 loss to the San Francisco 49ers, but injuries resulted in Vinny Testaverde taking the starting job.

Foley was traded to the Seattle Seahawks in 1999. He was released in a cost-cutting move during the Seahawks' final cuts before the 2000 season.

== Post–playing career ==
Foley worked at Sports Radio 950 AM in Philadelphia from August 2006 until March 2008 when WPEN joined ESPN Radio.

Foley was also camp director at Valley Forge Military Academy in Wayne, Pennsylvania. In 2010, he served as the academy's head football coach. In his only season as head coach he led the team to an 8–0 record. After leaving Valley Forge, Foley worked as an instructor for Football University.

== Personal life ==
Foley's father, Ed Sr., was a quarterback for Boston College from 1963 to 1965. His brother, Ed Jr. is, as of 2021, the Assistant Special Teams Coach of the NFL's Carolina Panthers. In the past Ed has Coached at Baylor and Temple, acting as recruiting coordinator for the Temple Owls and was the head coach of the Fordham Rams from 2004 to 2005.

Foley, married to his wife Theresa, has four boys and a daughter. As of 2011, Foley lives in Maryland.
