= Ed Foley Sr. =

American football player

Profile
- Position: Quarterback

Career information
- College: Boston College (1963–1965)

Ed Foley Sr. is an American former football quarterback who played for the Boston College Eagles from 1963 to 1965.

== High school ==
Foley attended Woburn High School in Woburn, Massachusetts. During his sophomore year, Foley batted .400 and pitched a no-hitter for the school's baseball team and was a top basketball guard in the Northeastern Conference. He became the football team's starting quarterback during his junior season. He completed 66 of 96 passes and threw for 10 touchdowns. As a senior, Foley led Woburn's football team to an undefeated season, was named to the Boston Globe All-Scholastic team, and was chosen as a Scholastic Magazine All-Star by the Associated Press. He was also named to the Globe's All-Hoop Second team and as a "bench" player on the Globe's All-Scholastic baseball team.

== Boston College ==
Foley was recruited to Boston College by Bob Cousy. He averaged 30 points per game for the Boston College freshman team, but gave the sport up after one season because he believed that he would be better at football and baseball. During the 1964 season, Foley began pressing Larry Marzetti for the starting quarterback job. He replaced Marzetti as starter for the team's October 10 game against Tennessee. Head coach Jim Miller played both Foley and Marzetti against undefeated Villanova. BC won the game 8 to 7 after Foley led a late touchdown drive and ran in a two-point conversion. Foley finished the year completing 72 of 144 passes for 947 yards with four touchdowns and nine interceptions. He also had 56 rushing yards and one rushing touchdown. Foley began the 1965 season as BC's starting quarterback, however after throwing three interceptions in a 17–0 loss to Penn State he was benched in favor of junior John Blair. Miller played both Blair and Foley in a 27 to 6 loss to Miami and returned Foley to the starring role the following week for the team's Senior day game against William & Mary. In that game, Foley broke Jack Concannon's record for passing yards and total yards in a game with 300 passing yards and 317 yards of total offense. He finished the season completing 57 of 120 passes for 979 yards with five touchdowns and eight interceptions. He also had 266 rushing yards and two rushing touchdowns. He finished his BC career with 129 completions in 263 attempts (49.1%), 1916 passing yards, 17 touchdowns, and 9 interceptions.

== Personal life ==
In 1971, Foley moved to Cherry Hill, New Jersey, where he worked as a regional manager for Confederation Life. He and his wife Sue had four sons and two daughters. Their eldest son, Ed Jr. played offensive line at Bucknell University and has since worked as a coach. Their second oldest, Cliff (1969–2018) was a starting quarterback at Cherry Hill High School East and played baseball at Villanova. Cliff was succeeded as East's quarterback by his brother Glenn, who led the school to its first championship and followed in his father's footsteps by playing quarterback at Boston College before moving on to the NFL. Their youngest son, Kevin, followed Glenn at East and signed with the Maryland Terrapins after high school. After two seasons backing up Scott Milanovich, he transferred to Boston University in order to receive more playing time. He has remained in sports as a producer for NFL Films, NASCAR Productions, and the NFL Network and as a regional manager for XOS Digital.

In 1998, Foley donated a kidney to his wife, who had lost both of hers to polycystic kidney disease.
