= Mike Power (Australian footballer) =

Australian rules footballer

Personal information
- Full name: Michael Power
- Born: 14 March 1955 (age 71)
- Original team: Salesian College
- Height: 180 cm (5 ft 11 in)
- Weight: 74 kg (163 lb)

Playing career^{1}
Years	Club	Games (Goals)
1974	Melbourne	2 (0)
- ^{1} Playing statistics correct to the end of 1974.

Michael Power (born 14 March 1955) is a former Australian rules footballer who played with Melbourne in the Victorian Football League (VFL).
