= Grayson James =

American football player (born 2002)

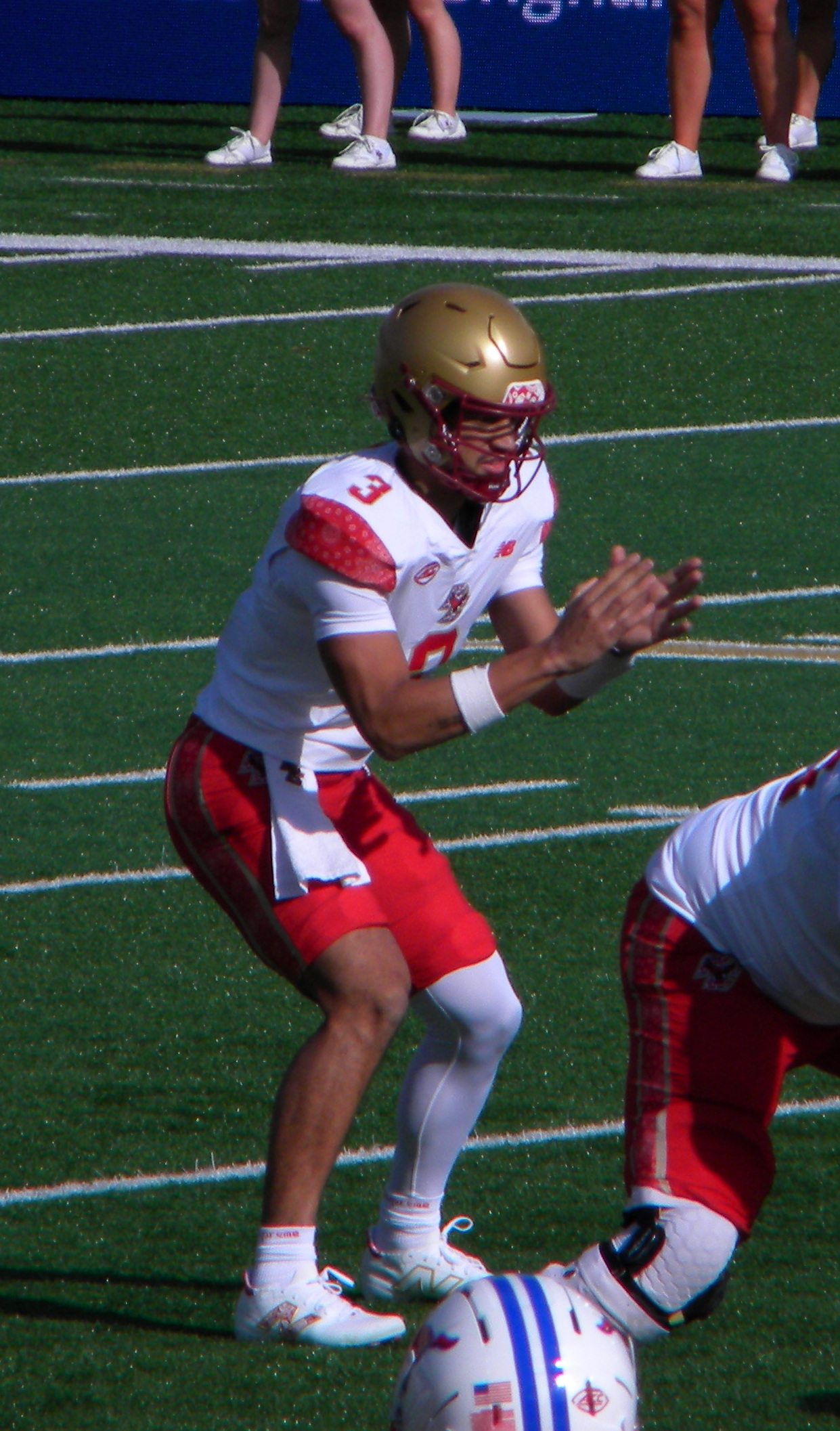
- James with Boston College in 2025

No. 3
- Position: Quarterback

Personal information
- Born: December 31, 2002 (age 23); Texas, U.S.
- Listed height: 6 ft 3 in (1.91 m)
- Listed weight: 218 lb (99 kg)

Career information
- High school: Duncanville (Duncanville, Texas)
- College: FIU (2021–2023); Boston College (2024–2025)
- Stats at ESPN

Grayson James (born December 31, 2002) is an American former college football quarterback. He played for the FIU Panthers and the Boston College Eagles.

== Early life ==
James attended John Paul II High School in Plano, Texas before transferring to Duncanville High School in Duncanville, Texas. Coming out of high school, he was rated as a three-star recruit and committed to play college football for the FIU Panthers.

== College career ==
=== FIU ===
==== 2021 season ====
As a true freshman in 2021, James appeared in 6 games. On the season, James completed 18-of-27 passes for 162 yards, 1 touchdown, and no interceptions. James also ran for 12 yards.

==== 2022 season ====
James was named the starter in his sophomore year at FIU. This season, James started 10 games, appearing in 11. On the season, James completed 209-of-357 passes for 1,967 yards, 11 touchdowns and 11 interceptions. James also ran for 223 yards and 3 touchdowns, giving him 14 total touchdowns on the season. James earned all-Conference honors as an all-Conference USA honorable mention in 2022.

==== 2023 season ====
James won the starting quarterback competition heading into the 2023 season. He struggled in the season opener against Louisiana Tech, completing five of 14 passes for four yards and an interception in a loss. He was benched following the performance, with true freshman Keyone Jenkins taking over as the starter the following week. James' next extended action came in Week 9 in relief against Jacksonville State, when he completed 12 of 20 passes for 200 yards and a touchdown. He also rushed for a touchdown, but FIU lost 41–16. Appearing in only three games, James retained a redshirt season. On December 4, 2023, James announced his intention to enter the NCAA transfer portal. In three seasons at FIU, James completed 247 of 422 passes for 2,342 yards, 13 touchdowns and 12 interceptions while adding 256 rushing yards and four rushing touchdowns.

=== Boston College ===
==== 2024 season ====
On January 17, 2024, James committed to the Boston College Eagles. In the offseason, James tore his labrum, which sidelined him for the first 3 games against Florida State, Duquesne, and Missouri. James returned for the Eagles week 4 red bandana game against Michigan State, but as the backup. Due to starting quarterback Thomas Castellanos suffering an undisclosed injury, James was named the starter for the Eagles Week 5 game against Western Kentucky. In his first start for Boston College, James completed 19-of-32 passes for 168 yards and a touchdown, while also rushing for a touchdown, in a 21-20 comeback win over Western Kentucky. In week 11, James entered the game for starter Thomas Castellanos who was benched, completing five of six pass attempts for 51 yards and a touchdown in a comeback win over Syracuse. After the Syracuse game, head coach Bill O’Brien named James the starter for their week 12 game at SMU. The next day, Thomas Castellanos announced he would be leaving the team, making James the likely starter for the rest of the season. In week 12, James made his second start for the Eagles, where he completed 18 of 32 pass attempts for 237 yards and a touchdown, while also adding a touchdown on the ground, in a close loss to a ranked SMU. After the loss, the Eagles fell to 5-5, and would need to win one of their last two games. The following week, James completed 18-of-27 passes for 192 yards and a touchdown, and he also ran for 38 yards and got a touchdown on the ground, and the Eagles beat North Carolina 41-21, becoming bowl eligible. Shortly after the game, longtime North Carolina head coach Mack Brown announced he would be retiring at the end of the season. In the final game of the season, James completed 20-of-28 passes for 253 yards and 2 touchdowns, and the Eagles beat the Pittsburgh Panthers 34-23, finishing the regular season 7-5. Shortly after, it was announced the Eagles had made the Pinstripe Bowl, and would be playing Nebraska. In this game, James completed 26-of-41 passes for 301 yards, while also adding 22 yards on the ground. The Eagles were missing a few key players to injury, and unfortunately came up short, losing 20-15. Despite Boston College landing Alabama transfer quarterback Dylan Lonergan, James announced he would not be entering the transfer portal and would return to Boston College for his fifth and final year.

==== 2025 season ====
On August 8, 2025, Alabama transfer Dylan Lonergan was named the starting quarterback, and Grayson James was named the backup. James entered the season as the backup quarterback, but in the season opener against Fordham he played the 4th quarter, completing 5-of-5 passes for 190 yards and a touchdown. Due to a 5-game losing streak, James was named the starter for the Eagles’ Week 8 game against UConn. In this game, James completed 16-of-28 passes for 204 yards, 2 touchdowns, and no interceptions, while adding 26 yards rushing, but the Eagles came up short, losing 38-23. The following week, he completed 23-of-46 passes for 244 yards, 3 touchdowns, and 2 interceptions in a 38-24 loss to a ranked Louisville team. Before next weeks game against Notre Dame, it was announced James had injured his hip flexor against Louisville, and he was not fully healthy. Dylan Lonergan was named the starter for the week 10 game against Notre Dame. After an early interception, despite not being fully healthy, Lonergan was benched in favor of James in the first quarter. James completed 25-of-37 passes for 240 yards, one touchdown and 2 interceptions in a 25-10 loss to the Fighting Irish. James was named the starter for the Week 11 red bandana game against SMU. James was benched early in the game in favor of Lonergan. The Eagles lost 45-13. Lonergan started in next weeks game as well. In the final week of the season, Lonergan injured his finger in the first quarter, and James came in to play. James completed 16-of-24 passes for 288 yards, and the Eagles closed out the season with a 34-12 victory over Syracuse. The Eagles finished the season 2-10, and James graduated from Boston College shortly after. James finished his college career with over 4,700 passing yards and 33 total touchdowns.

=== Statistics ===
Year	Team	Games			Passing								Rushing			
Year	Team	GP	GS	Record	Cmp	Att	Pct	Yds	Y/A	TD	Int	Rtg	Att	Yds	Avg	TD
2021	FIU	6	0	—	18	27	66.7	155	5.7	1	0	127.1	5	12	2.4	0
2022	FIU	11	10	3−7	210	358	58.7	1,969	5.5	11	11	108.9	79	223	2.8	3
2023	FIU	3	1	0−1	19	37	51.4	218	5.9	1	1	104.4	21	21	1.0	1
2024	Boston College	6	5	3−2	106	166	63.9	1,202	7.2	6	2	134.2	37	79	2.1	3
2025	Boston College	7	3	0–3	87	151	57.6	1,196	7.9	7	5	132.8	54	57	1.1	0
Career		33	19	6−13	440	739	59.5	4,740	6.4	26	19	119.9	196	392	2.0	7
