= Dylan Lonergan =

American football player (born 2004)

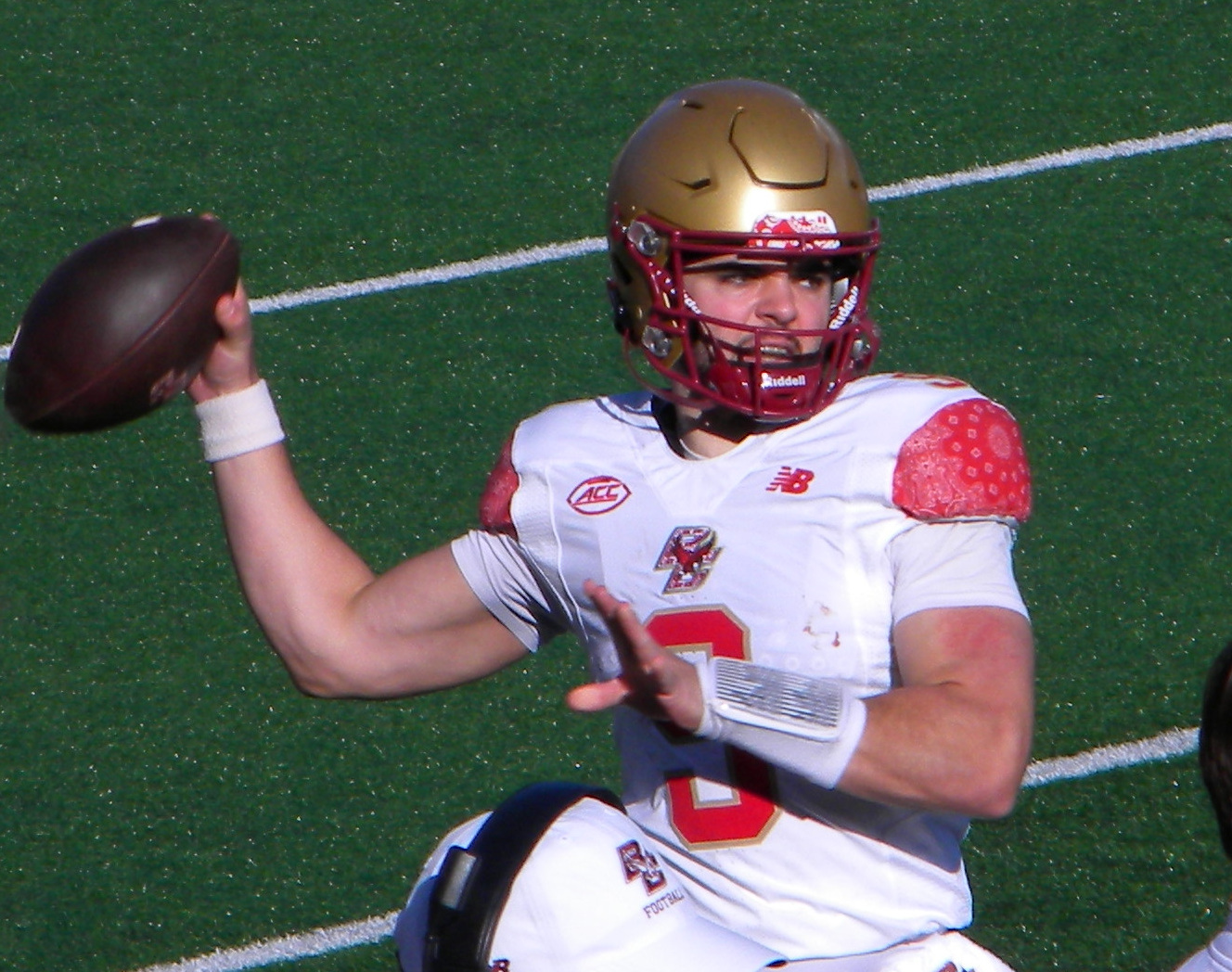
- Lonergan with Boston College in 2025

No. 12 – Rutgers Scarlet Knights
- Position: Quarterback
- Class: Senior

Personal information
- Born: May 30, 2004 (age 22)
- Listed height: 6 ft 2 in (1.88 m)
- Listed weight: 210 lb (95 kg)

Career information
- High school: Brookwood (Snellville, Georgia)
- College: Alabama (2023–2024); Boston College (2025); Rutgers (2026–present)
- Stats at ESPN

Dylan Lonergan (born May 30, 2004) is an American college football quarterback for the Rutgers Scarlet Knights. He previously played for the Alabama Crimson Tide and Boston College Eagles.

== Early life ==
Lonergan attended Brookwood High School in Snellville, Georgia. During his high school career, he had 72 passing touchdowns, 16 rushing touchdowns and over 8,000 yards of total offense. Lonergan was selected to the 2023 Under Armour All-America game. He committed to the University of Alabama to play college football. Lonergan also played baseball in high school.

== College career ==
=== Alabama ===
Lonergan played at Alabama in 2023 and 2024. In three games over the two years, he completed seven of eight passes for 35 yards. On December 11, 2024, Lonergan announced he was entering the transfer portal.

=== Boston College ===
On December 17, 2024, Lonergan committed to Boston College. That spring, Lonergan entered a starting quarterback competition with returning quarterback Grayson James. On August 12, 2025, head coach Bill O’Brien named Dylan Lonergan the starting quarterback for the upcoming season. In the season opener against the Fordham Rams, Lonergan completed 26-of-34 passes for 268 yards, 4 passing touchdowns, and no interceptions, leading the Eagles to a massive 66-10 victory. That week, it was reported that Lonergan was spotted with a walking boot, and did not practice at the beginning of the week. Lonergan eventually returned to practice later in the week, and was healthy enough to start the Eagles Week 2 game at Michigan State. In this game, Lonergan completed 34-of-45 passes for 390 yards, 4 touchdowns, and no interceptions. The Eagles came up short, losing 42-40 to Michigan State in double overtime. In the Week 3 game against Stanford, Lonergan completed 30-of-44 passes for 333 yards, 1 touchdown, and 1 interception in a 30-20 loss at Stanford. The following week, the Eagles were losing 27-24 to the California Golden Bears. The Eagles drove it down to the 5-yard line with seconds left on the clock. After a dropped pass, Lonergan threw an interception on the goal line the following play, leading to a 27-24 loss, making the Eagles 1-3 on the season. Lonergan completed 21-of-37 passes in this game, throwing for 197 yards, no touchdowns, and 2 interceptions. 2 weeks later, after back to back blowout losses to Pittsburgh and Clemson, head coach Bill O’Brien named backup Grayson James the starter for the Week 8 home game against UConn. James started the following 2 games. In the Week 9 game against Louisville, James injured his hip flexor. Due to him not being fully healthy, head coach Bill O’Brien named Dylan Lonergan the starter for the Eagles Week 10 matchup against Notre Dame. Due to an early interception, Lonergan was benched in the first quarter. The Eagles ended up losing 25-10. In Week 13, the Eagles were 1-9, and decided to name Lonergan the starter for their matchup against a ranked opponent, Georgia Tech. Boston College competed well, but unfortunately Lonergan and the Eagles came up short, losing on a game-winning field goal 36-34. Lonergan completed 26-of-40 passes for 362 yards, 2 touchdowns and no interceptions. In the final game of the season against Syracuse, Lonergan injured his finger in the first quarter, and did not return to the game, ending his season at Boston College. On December 4, 2025, Lonergan announced his intent to enter the transfer portal.

=== Rutgers ===
On January 5, 2026, Lonergan committed to play football at Rutgers. On August 24, Lonergan was named as the starting quarterback, beating AJ Surace in a QB battle.

=== Statistics ===
Year	Team	Games			Passing								Rushing			
Year	Team	GP	GS	Record	Cmp	Att	Pct	Yds	Y/A	TD	Int	Rtg	Att	Yds	Avg	TD
2023	Alabama	1	0	—	2	2	100.0	12	6.0	0	0	150.4	1	5	5.0	0
2024	Alabama	2	0	—	5	6	83.3	23	3.8	0	0	115.5	1	16	16.0	0
2025	Boston College	10	9	2–7	190	284	66.9	2,025	7.1	12	5	137.2	36	-37	-1.0	1
2026	Rutgers	6	6	2–4	74	127	58.3	1,006	8.4	10	6	145.4	22	46	2.1	0
Career		19	15	4–11	271	419	64.7	3,126	7.5	22	11	139.4	60	30	0.5	1
