= Mike Power (American football) =

American football player

Profile
- Position: Quarterback

Career information
- High school: Westborough
- College: Boston College Eagles

Career history
- Bay State Titans (1990); Barcelona Dragons (1992); Houston Oilers (1992–1993)*; Massachusetts Marauders (1994)*
- * Offseason or practice squad member only

Mike Power is an American football quarterback who played for the Boston College Eagles and various professional teams.

== High school ==
Power became Westborough High School's starting varsity quarterback during his freshman year when his brother Tom, who was supposed to be the varsity starter, separated his shoulder before the season started and was out for the year. By Mike's senior season, he was one of the best quarterbacks in Central Massachusetts. He led Westborough to a 10–1 record and defeated Fitchburg 25–7 to win Westborough's first and currently only football championship.

In addition to playing football, Power was also a starting guard on Westborough High School's basketball team and a starting outfielder on their baseball team.

== Boston College ==
Power always planned to attend Boston College. His father and uncle played for the Boston College Eagles men's basketball team and one of his cousins, Frank Power, was a long-time assistant basketball coach. Power committed to BC in November 1984. In addition to Power, Boston College signed Parade High School All-Americans Mark Kamphaus and David Thompson, as well as Ed Duran. During their freshman season, coach Jack Bicknell moved Thompson and Duran to defense, which allowed Power to moved up to second on the depth chart, behind Shawn Halloran. Halloran struggled during the Eagles' 1986 season opener and Power replaced him. He completed 9 of 17 passes for 64 yards and ran for another 42 yards in three quarters before suffering a foot injury that kept him out for the rest of the season.

Entering his sophomore season, Power competed with Mark Kamphaus for the starting job. Ten days before the season opener, Bicknell named Power the starter and Power finished the season as the team's leading passer. He completed 133 of 233 passes for 2,071 yards, 10 touchdowns, and 9 interceptions. His 8.9 passing yards per attempt were fourth best in Division I football, behind Don McPherson of Syracuse, Chuck Hartlieb of Iowa, and Troy Aikman of UCLA.

During his junior year, Power completed 72 of 146 passes for 883 yards and threw 2 touchdowns and 7 interceptions.

During his senior year, Power was benched in favor of Mark Kamphaus and Willie Hicks. Coach Bicknell did, however, allow Power to start his final college game, a 13–12 loss to Georgia Tech.

During his career at Boston College, Power completed 230 of 428 passes for 3,176 yards and threw 12 touchdowns and 20 interceptions.

== Professional career ==
Power went undrafted in the 1990 NFL draft. He had a tryout with the New England Patriots, but was not signed. He planned on joining Boston College's coaching staff as a graduate assistant, but instead decided to make an attempt at playing professional football and joined the Bay State Titans of the Minor League Football System, a new football league established with some assistance from the NFL as a feeder league for the World League of American Football. Power beat out former UNH starter and 1989 draft pick Bobby Jean for the starting job. In his first play from scrimmage in his first game, Power injured his right rotator cuff. He did not start the next game, but came in during the fourth quarter and completed 8 of 14 attempts for 114 yards. He returned to the starting lineup the following week, but was replaced by former Northeastern quarterback Rich Rodriguez after an ineffective first quarter. Despite this, Power was chosen to start the following week and led the Titans to victory over the Charlotte Barons. It was Charlotte's first defeat in two years. The Titans finished the season 8-2 and finished second in the Eastern Division behind the eventual league champions, the Charlotte Barons. While playing for the Titans, Power also served as a volunteer assistant at Westborough High School, painted houses, and attended graduate school at Boston College.

In 1992, Power signed with the Barcelona Dragons of the WLAF, who were coached by Power's former college coach, Jack Bicknell. Later that year, Houston Oilers starting quarterback Warren Moon held out of training camp so the Oilers' General Manager and former Boston College player and coach Mike Holovak signed Power. Power was cut during training camp, but was brought back the following year only to be cut once again.

In 1994, Power signed with the Massachusetts Marauders of the Arena Football League.

== Business career ==
In 1989, while playing his fifth year of football, Power began attending graduate school at Boston College. He earned his MBA in 1991 and began working for Merrill Lynch before signing with the Barcelona Dragons. After his football career ended, Power went to work for Paine Webber as a bond trader on Wall Street. In 1995 the company moved him to Los Angeles. In 2004, he started Power Asset Management, where Power manages bond portfolios for high-end families. In 2009, Power managed about $200 million in assets for around 50 families.

Since 1996, Power has also run quarterback clinics in the Los Angeles area.
