= Mark Kamphaus =

American football player

Profile
- Position: Quarterback

Personal information
- Born: Cincinnati, Ohio, U.S.
- Listed height: 6 ft 2 in (1.88 m)
- Listed weight: 190 lb (86 kg)

Career information
- High school: Archbishop Moeller (Cincinnati)
- College: Boston College
- NFL draft: 1990: undrafted

Career history
- Albany Firebirds (1990)

Awards and highlights
- Scanlan Award (1988)

Career AFL statistics
- Comp. / Att.: 21 / 50
- Passing yards: 186
- TD–INT: 3–4
- Passer rating: 34.25
- Rushing yard: 13
- Stats at ArenaFan.com

Mark Kamphaus is an American former football quarterback.

Kamphaus played high school football at Cincinnati's famed Moeller High School and went on to play college football at Boston College from 1986 to 1989. After backing up Shawn Halloran his freshman year, he split the starting job with Mike Power in his Sophomore and Junior seasons and with Power and Willie Hicks in his senior year. His most famous victory was 38–24 upset over Army in the first ever Emerald Isle Classic. He finished 6th all time in passing yards (2,422) and 3rd in completion percentage (57.1).

He played one season in the Arena Football League with the Albany Firebirds. He completed 21 of 50 passes for 186 yards, 3 touchdowns, and 4 interceptions.
