= Mark Hartsell =

American football player (born 1973)

No. 11
- Position: Quarterback

Personal information
- Born: December 7, 1973 (age 52); Bridgewater, Massachusetts, U.S.
- Listed height: 6 ft 4 in (1.93 m)
- Listed weight: 225 lb (102 kg)

Career information
- High school: Brockton
- College: Boston College
- NFL draft: 1996: undrafted

Career history
- Washington Redskins (1996–1997)*; Scottish Claymores (1997); Chicago Bears (2000); Indianapolis Colts (2001)*
- * Offseason or practice squad member only
- Stats at Pro Football Reference

Mark Hartsell (born December 7, 1973, in Brockton, Massachusetts) is an American former quarterback for the Boston College Eagles, Chicago Bears, and Scottish Claymores.

== College/Amateur ==
Lettered in basketball, football, and baseball at Brockton High School. Played under both Tom Coughlin and Dan Henning at Boston College. As a junior, started 11 of 12 games and completed 159 of 257 passes with 13 TDs. His first collegiate pass as a starter was a 74-yard TD pass vs. Michigan. As a senior, he started 11 games, completing 188 of 349 attempts for 1,864 yards and 12 TDs. Was the winning quarterback in the 1994 Aloha Bowl, completing 12 of 29 passes for 168 yards. Finished 5th all time in passing yards, 6th in attempts & completions at Boston College.

== Professional career ==
Signed as an undrafted rookie free agent with the Washington Redskins in 1996, but didn't make the final cut. In 1997 Hartsell was allocated to the Scottish Claymores of NFL Europe by the Redskins. Hartsell was out of football in 1998 and 1999, before joining the Chicago Bears practice squad in 2000. In 2000, he appeared in his only NFL game on Sunday Night Football on December 3, 2000 against the Green Bay Packers. He played one play, attempting a pass to TE Kaseem Sinceno that fell incomplete. Hartsell was claimed of waivers by the Indianapolis Colts before the 2001 season, but didn’t make the team.

He now is an assistant football coach at Seekonk High School in Seekonk, MA.

== Personal life ==
Hartsell currently resides in Bridgewater with his wife Jen and three kids, Austin, Chase, and Kenley. He works as a personal quarterback coach for youth and collegiate players on the east coast, and has partnered with pitching and quarterback guru Tom House in LA, California. He has worked with New England Patriots wide receiver, Julian Edelman, and many other notable players.
