= List of Duke University people =

This list of Duke University people includes alumni, faculty, presidents, and major philanthropists of Duke University, which includes three undergraduate and ten graduate schools. The undergraduate schools include Trinity College of Arts and Sciences, Pratt School of Engineering, Sanford School of Public Policy, and Duke Kunshan University. The university's graduate and professional schools include the graduate school, the Pratt School of Engineering, the Nicholas School of the Environment, the School of Medicine, the School of Nursing, the Fuqua School of Business, the School of Law, the Divinity School, the Sanford School of Public Policy, Duke Kunshan University, and Duke–NUS Medical School.

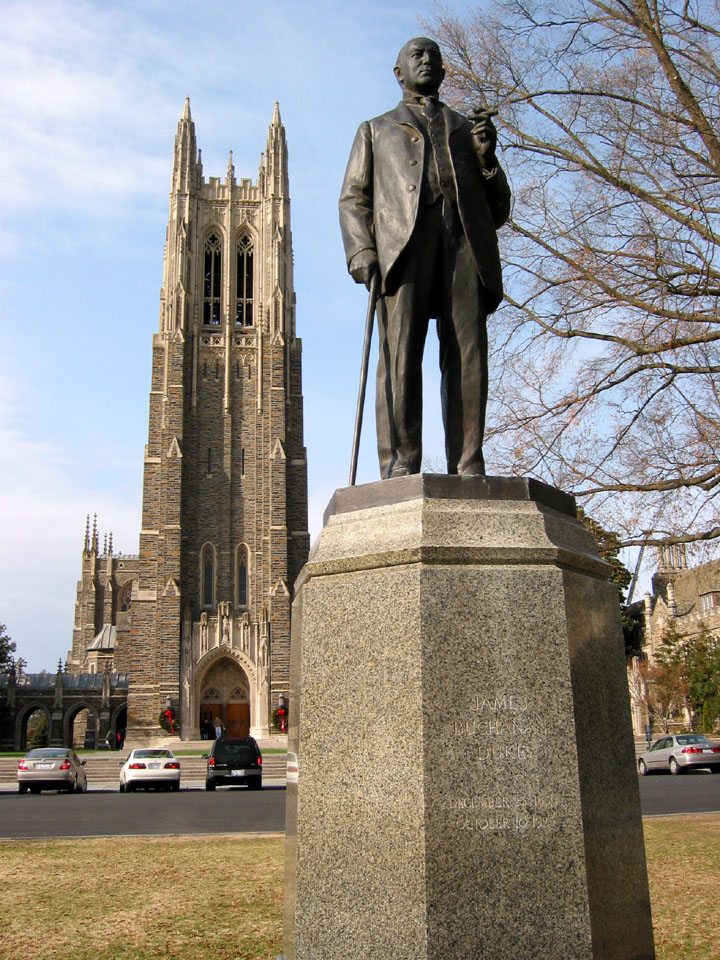
James B. Duke established a $40 million trust fund, The Duke Endowment, in 1924, propelling the university to officially change its name in honor of his family's philanthropy.

== International academic prizes ==
=== Nobel laureates ===
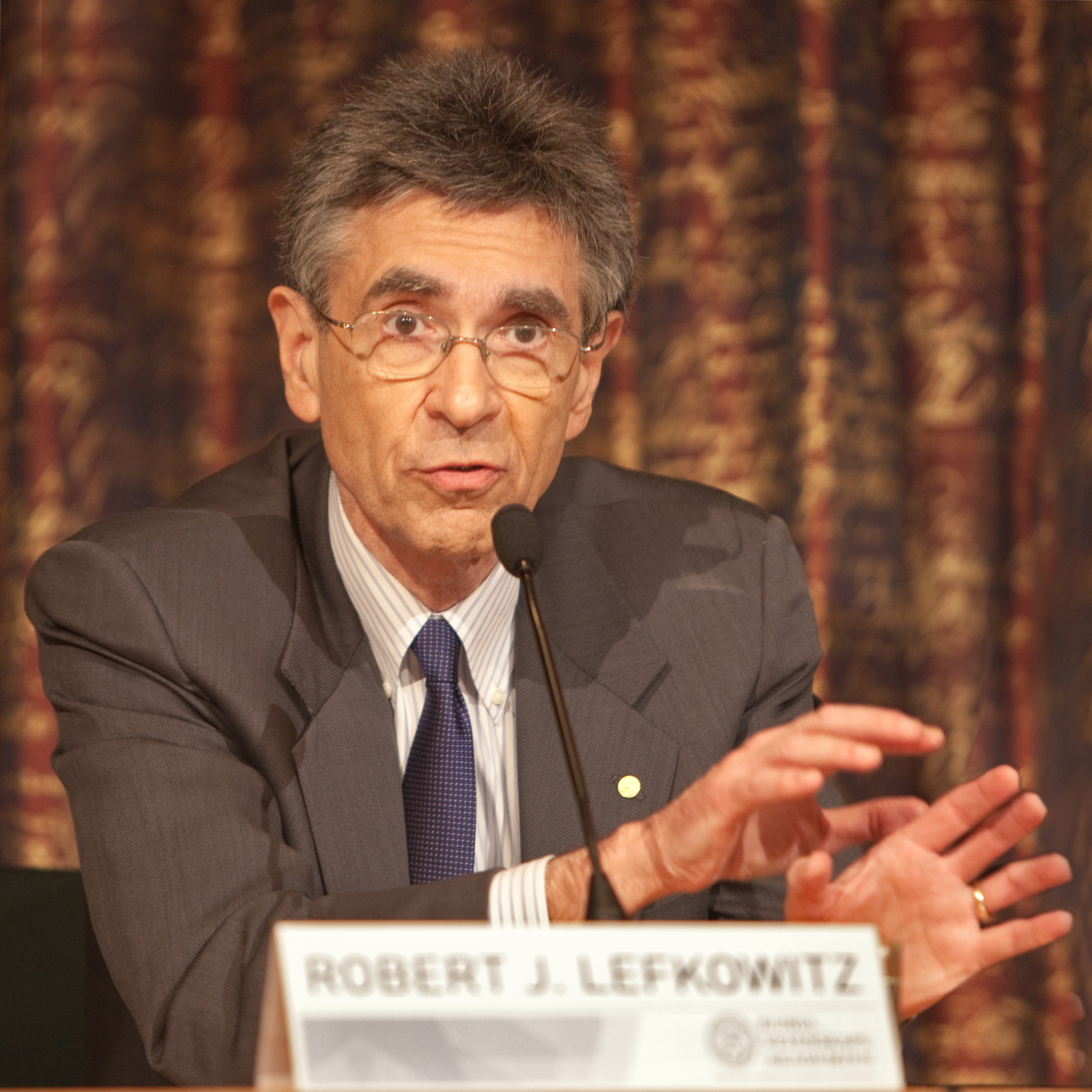
Robert Lefkowitz, James B. Duke Professor of Medicine and professor of Biochemistry and Chemistry at Duke and the 2012 Nobel laureate in Chemistry

As of 2024, 16 Nobel laureates have been affiliated with Duke University. The following list includes only those who have graduated from Duke or spent at least one year as a postdoctoral researcher/medical resident/visiting professor or two years as a faculty member at Duke.

- Charles Townes (A.M. in physics, 1937), 1964 Nobel laureate in physics and winner of the 2005 Templeton Prize, National Medal of Science (1982)
- Gertrude B. Elion (adjunct professor of pharmacology and of experimental medicine 1971–1983 and research professor 1983–1999), 1988 Nobel laureate in physiology or medicine
- George H. Hitchings (adjunct professor of pharmacology and of experimental medicine 1970–1985), 1988 Nobel laureate in physiology or medicine
- Hans Dehmelt (post-doc 1952–1955), 1989 Nobel laureate in physics, recipient of the National Medal of Science (1995)
- Martin Rodbell (adjunct professor of cell biology 1991–1998), 1994 Nobel laureate in physiology or medicine
- Robert Coleman Richardson (Ph.D. in physics, 1966), 1996 Nobel laureate in Physics
- Peter Agre (vice chancellor for science and technology at Duke University Medicine Center 2005 – December 2007), 2003 Nobel laureate in chemistry
- Robert Lefkowitz (James B. Duke Professor of Medicine and professor of Biochemistry and Chemistry, joined Duke in 1973), 2012 Nobel laureate in Chemistry, National Medal of Science (2007)
- Brian Kobilka (post-doc 1984–1989), 2012 Nobel laureate in chemistry
- Paul L. Modrich (James B. Duke Professor of Biochemistry at Duke University, joined Duke in 1976), 2015 Nobel laureate in Chemistry
- George Smith (Visiting Professor 1983–1984), 2018 Nobel laureate in Chemistry
- William Kaelin Jr. (B.S. 1979, M.D. 1982), 2019 Nobel laureate in Medicine
- Gregg L. Semenza (Pediatrics residency), 2019 Nobel laureate in Medicine
- Simon Johnson (associate professor at the Fuqua School of Business 1991–1997), 2024 Nobel laureate in Economics

=== Turing Award laureates ===
In the absence of a Nobel Prize in Computer science, the Turing Award generally is recognized as the highest honor in the subject and the "Nobel Prize of computing." As of 2015, three Turing Award laureates have been affiliated with Duke University.

- Frederick P. Brooks (A.B. 1953), software engineer and computer scientist, known for managing the development of IBM's System/360 family of computers; National Medal of Technology and Innovation laureate in 1985, IEEE John von Neumann Medal laureate in 1993 and Turing Award laureate in 1999
- Edmund M. Clarke (M.A. 1968; faculty, 1976–1978), computer scientist; academic; developed model checking; Turing Award laureate in 2007
- John Cocke (B.S. 1945, Ph.D. 1956), considered the "father" of the RISC computer architecture, Turing Award laureate in 1987, National Medal of Technology and Innovation laureate in 1991 and National Medal of Science in 1994

== Alumni ==
Selected Duke alumni:

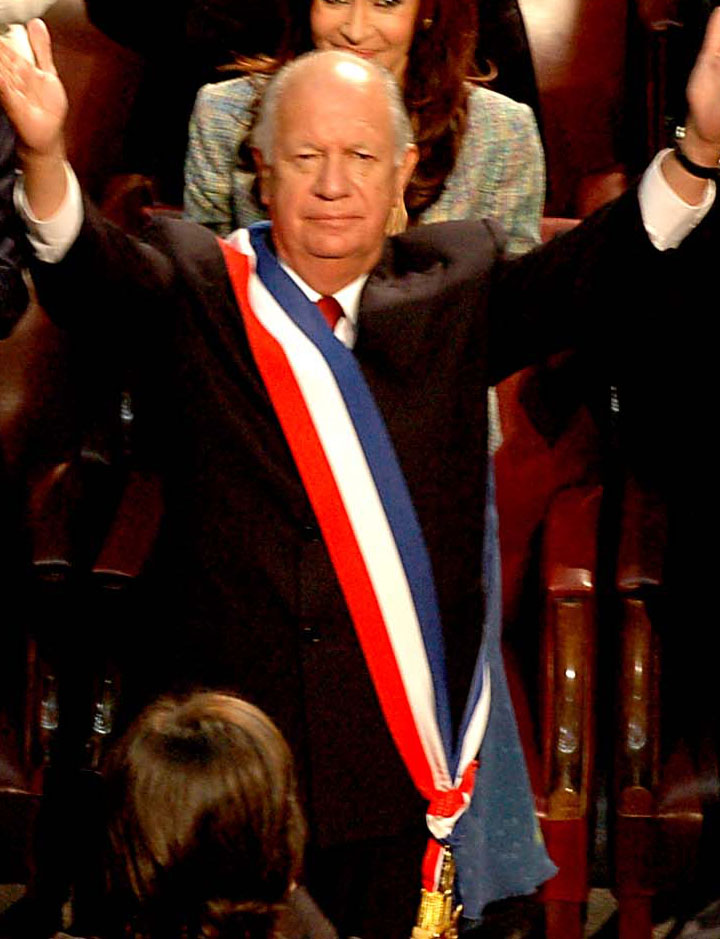
Chilean President Ricardo Lagos, Ph.D. 1966

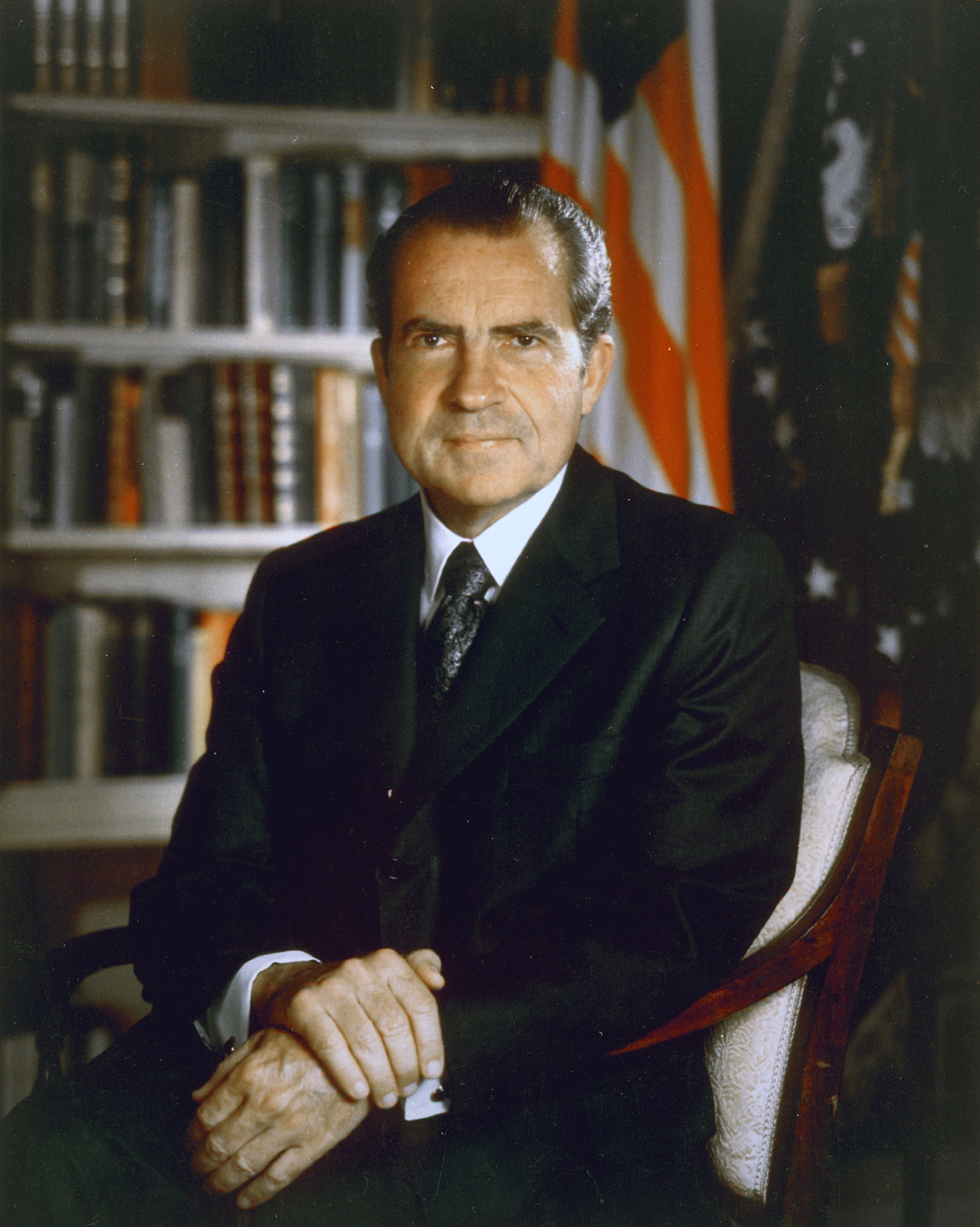
U.S. President Richard Nixon, LLB 1937

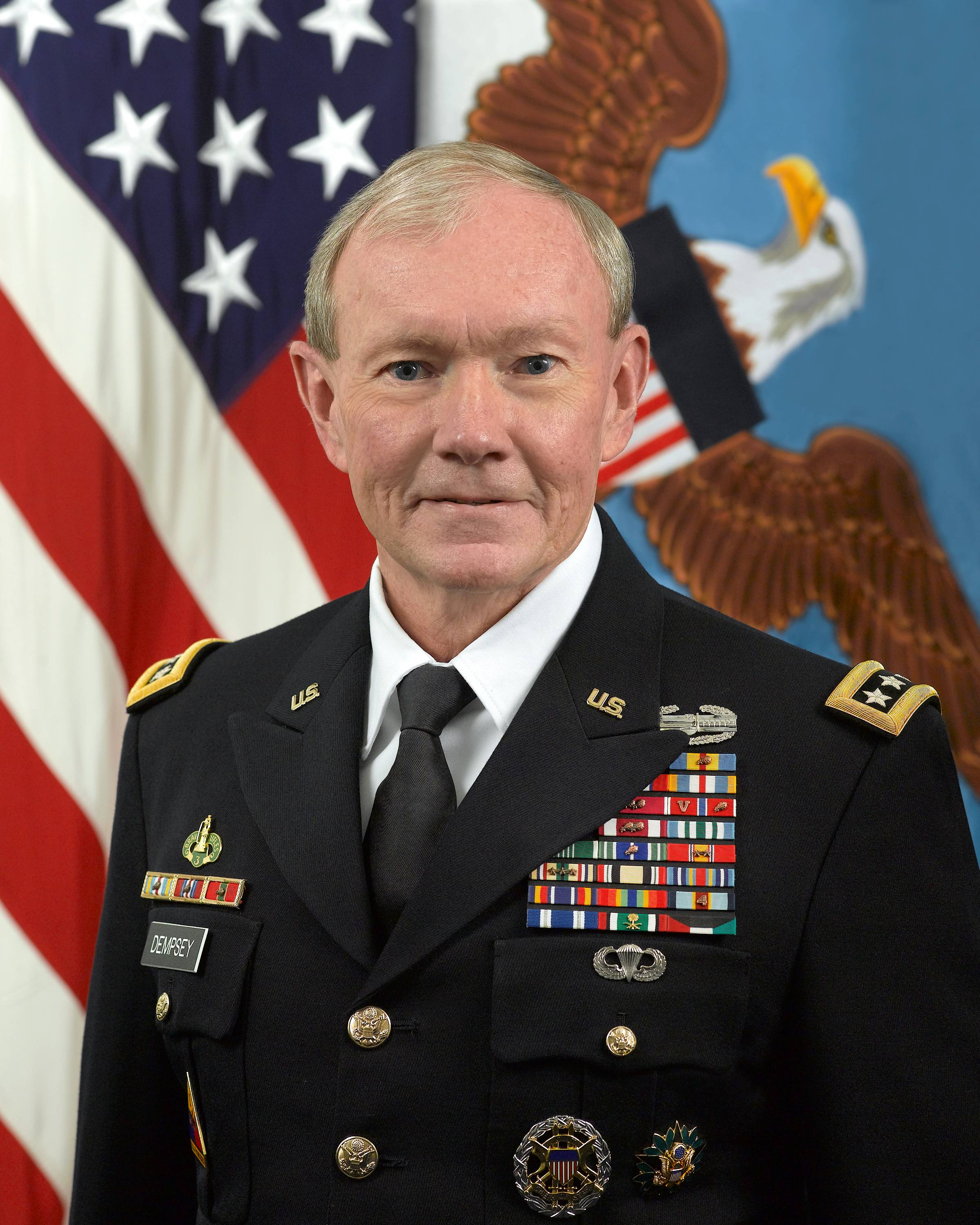
Chairman of the Joint Chiefs of Staff Martin Dempsey, M.A. 1984

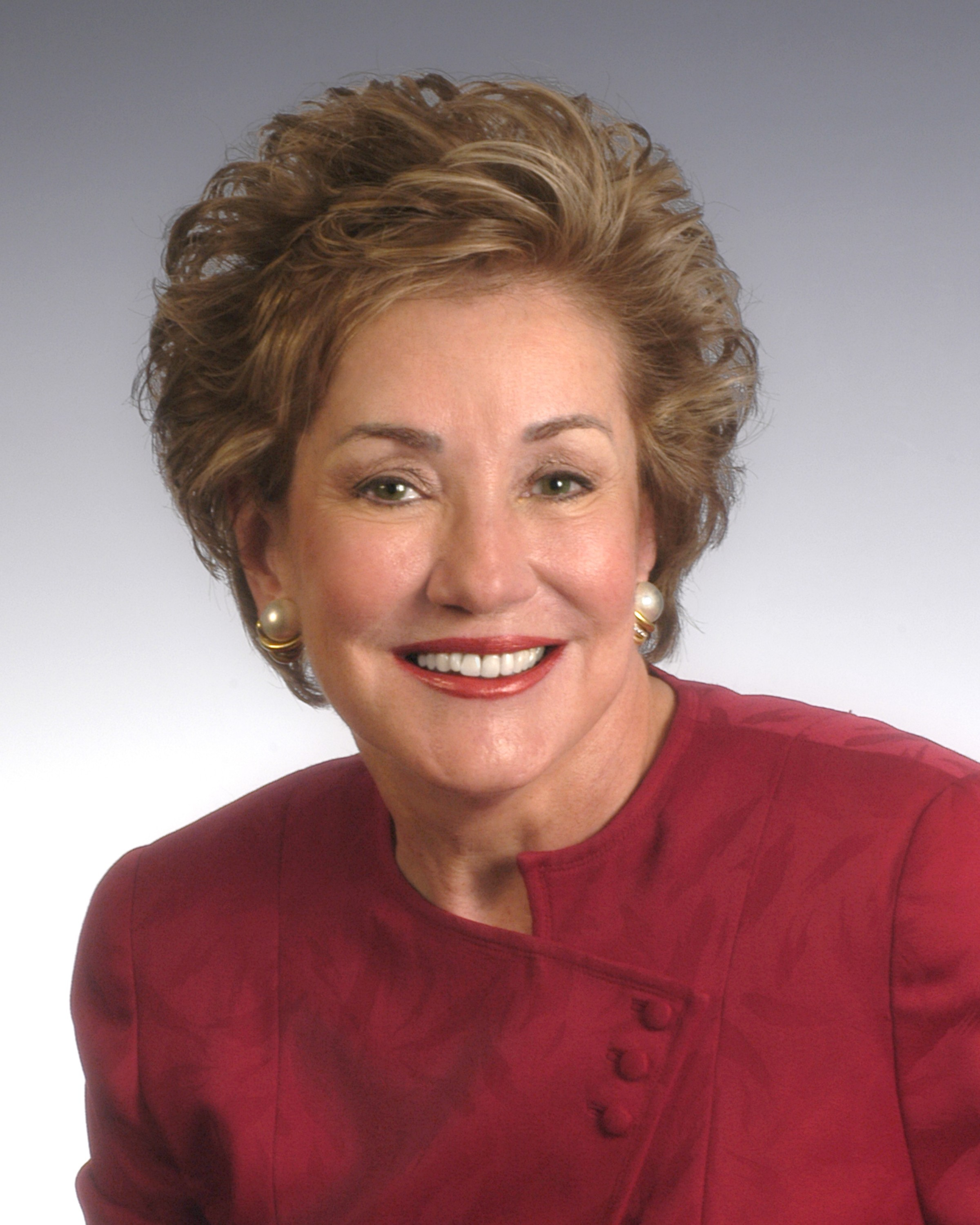
U.S. Senator and cabinet secretary Elizabeth Dole, A.B. 1958

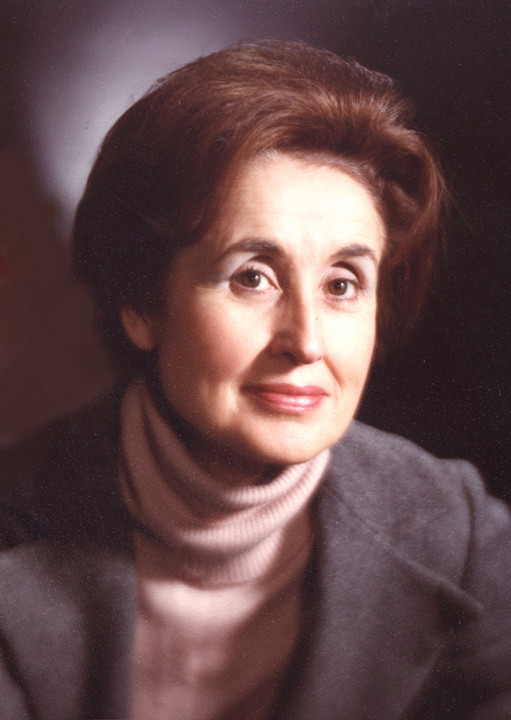
U.S. Secretary of Commerce Juanita Kreps, Ph.D. 1948

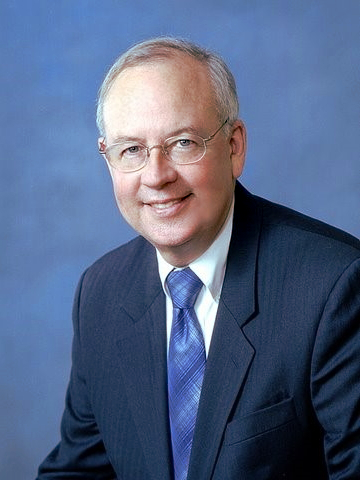
U.S. Solicitor General Kenneth Starr, J.D. 1973

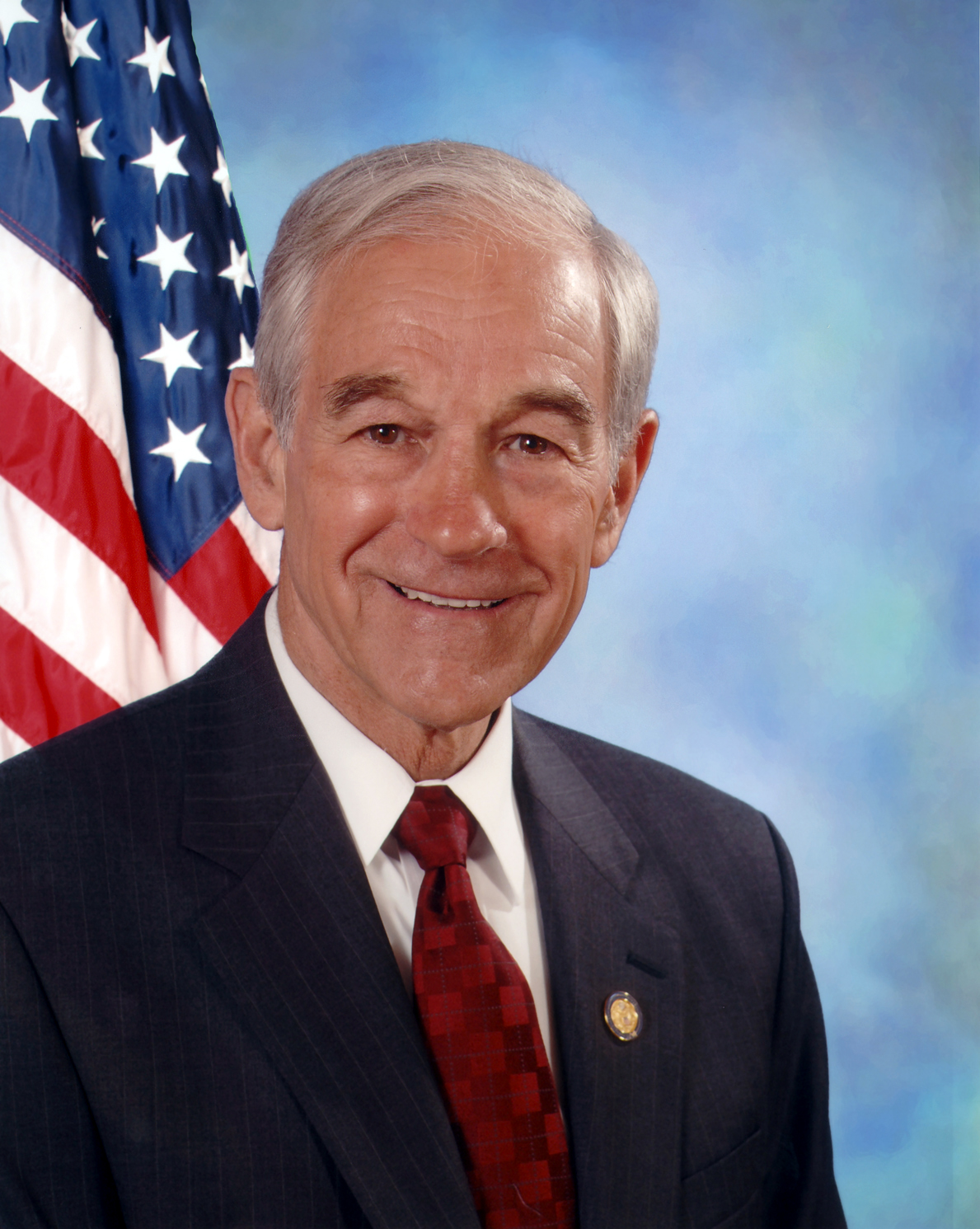
U.S. Congressman Ron Paul, M.D. 1961

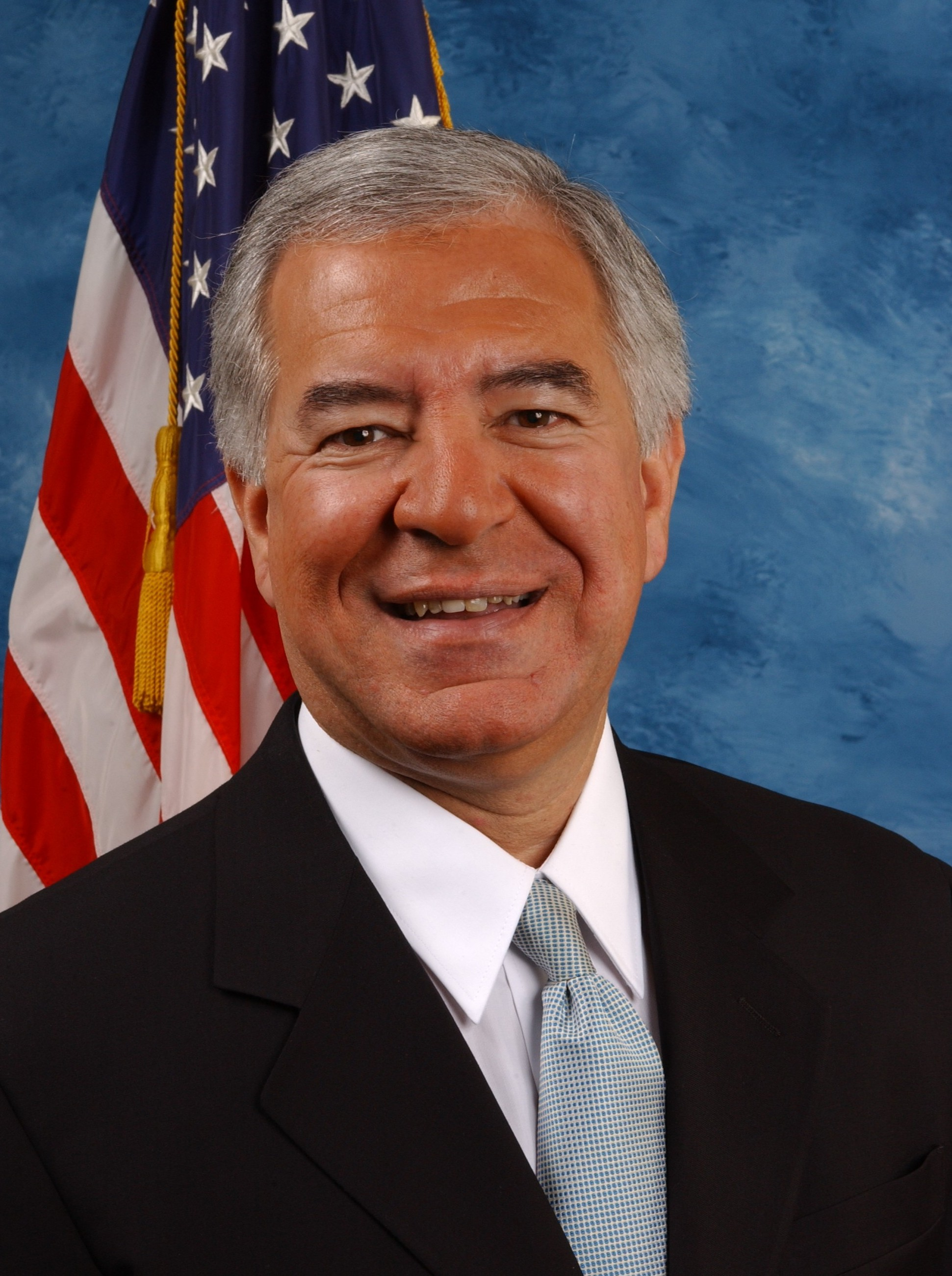
U.S. Congressman Nick Rahall, A.B. 1971

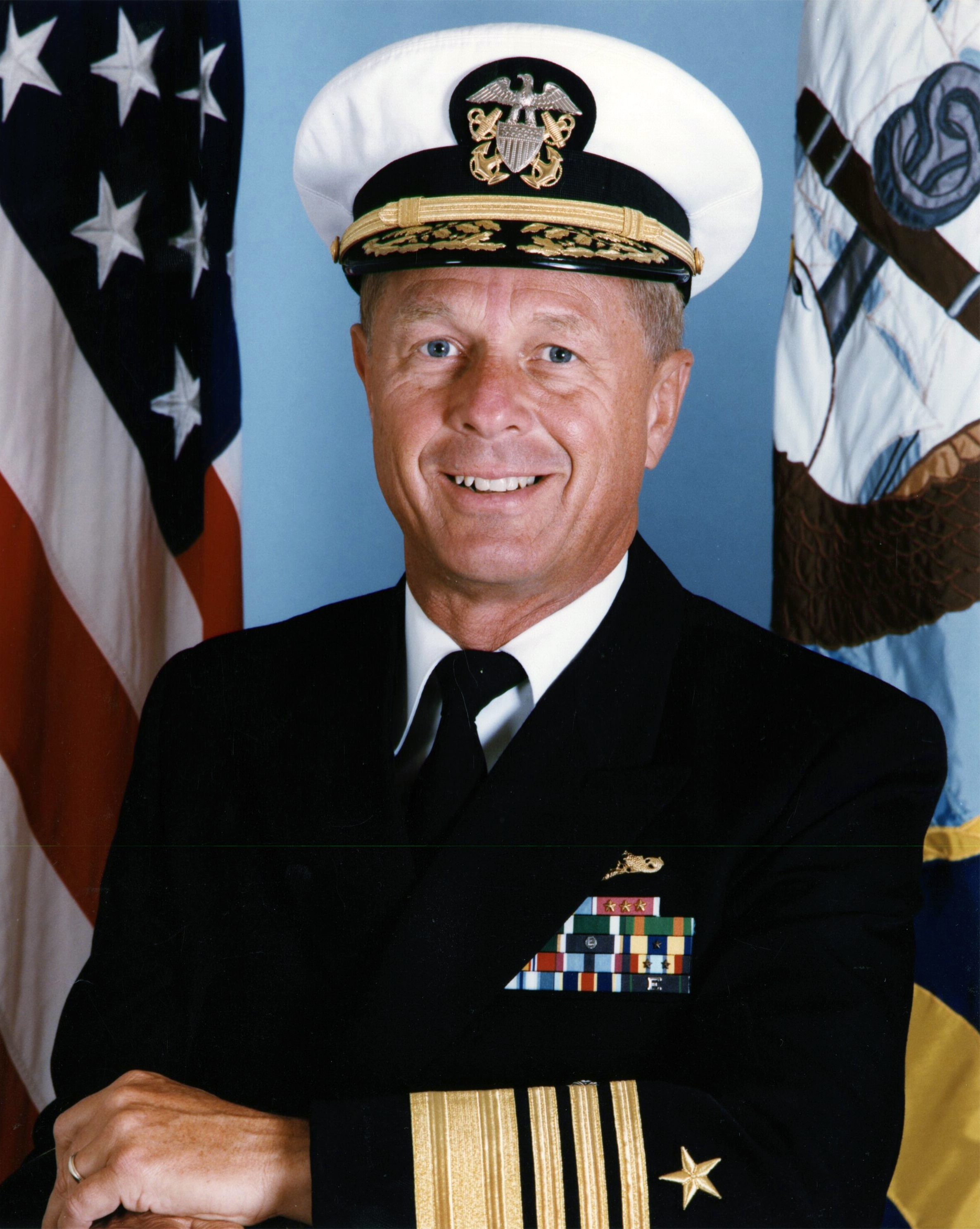
Admiral Frank Bowman, B.S. 1966

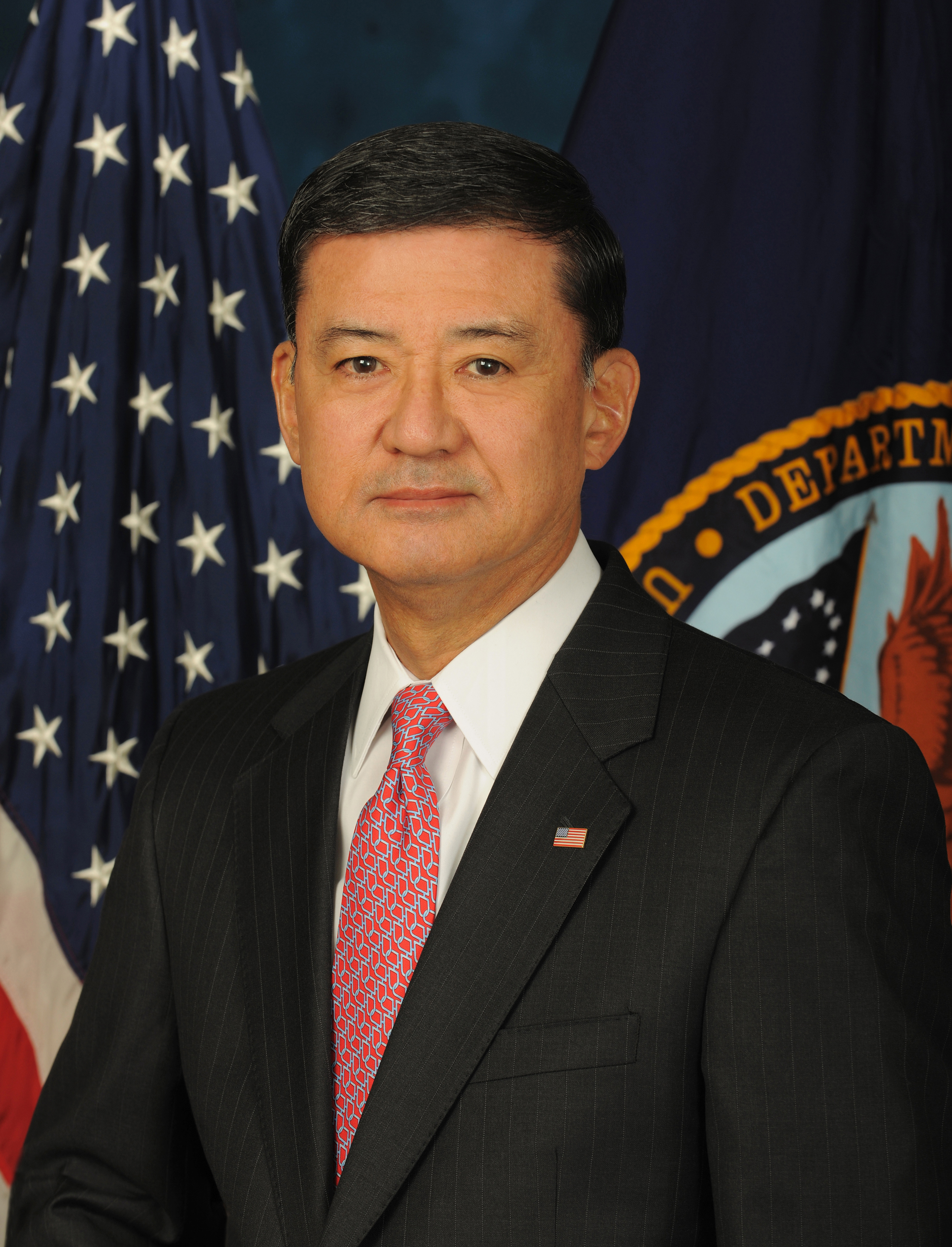
U.S. Secretary of Veterans Affairs Eric Shinseki, A.M. 1976

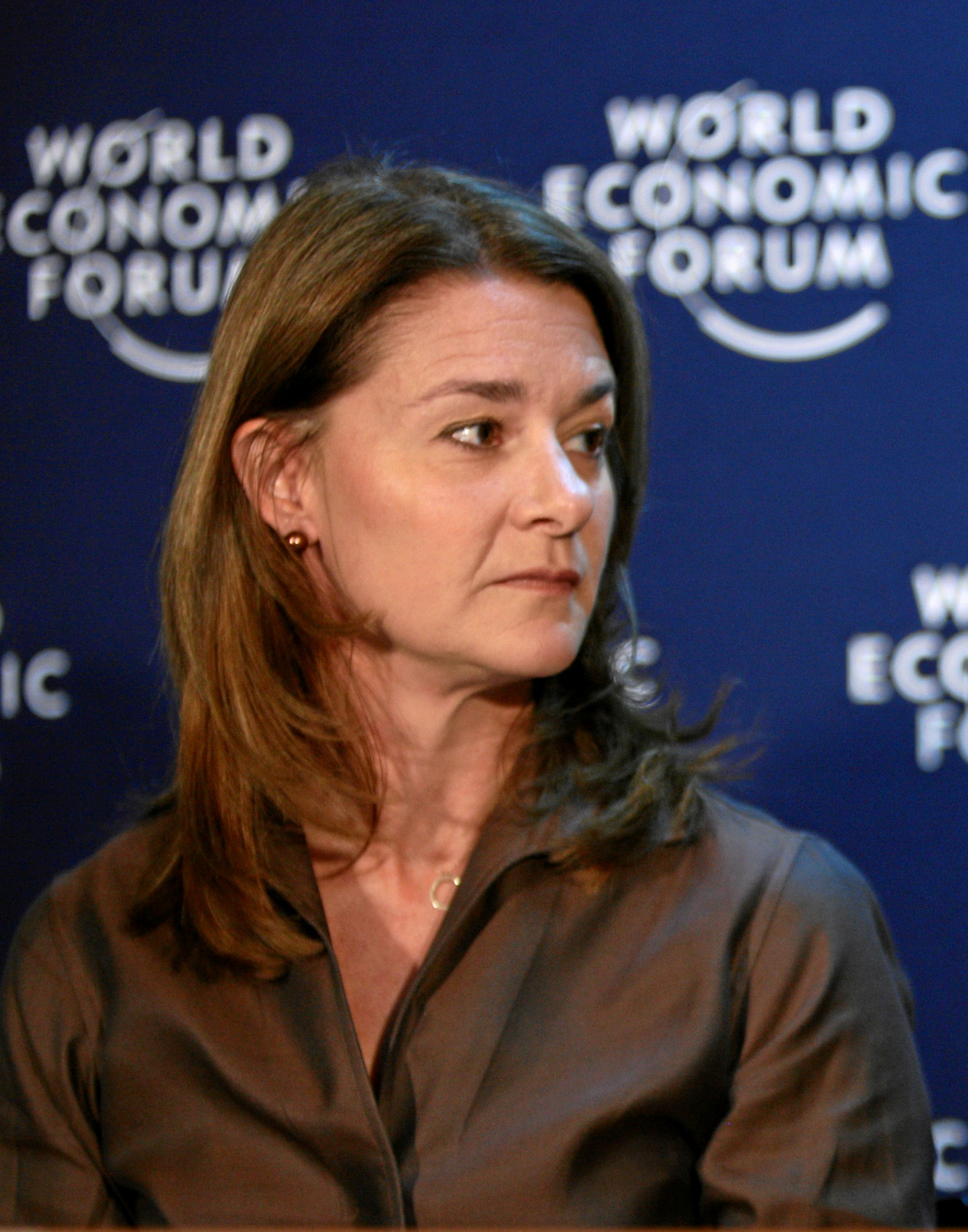
Philanthropist Melinda Gates, A.B. 1986, M.B.A. 1987

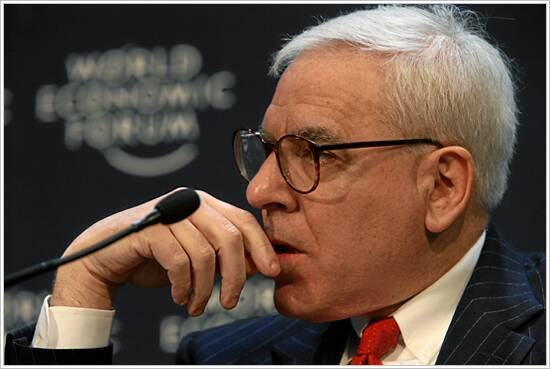
Financier and philanthropist David Rubenstein, A.B. 1970

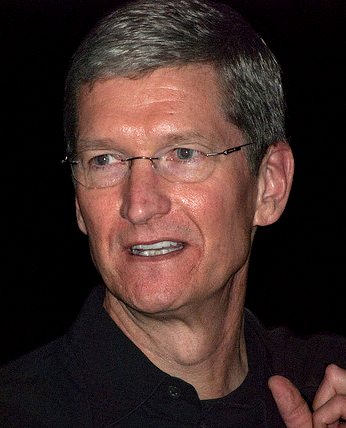
Apple CEO Tim Cook, M.B.A. 1988

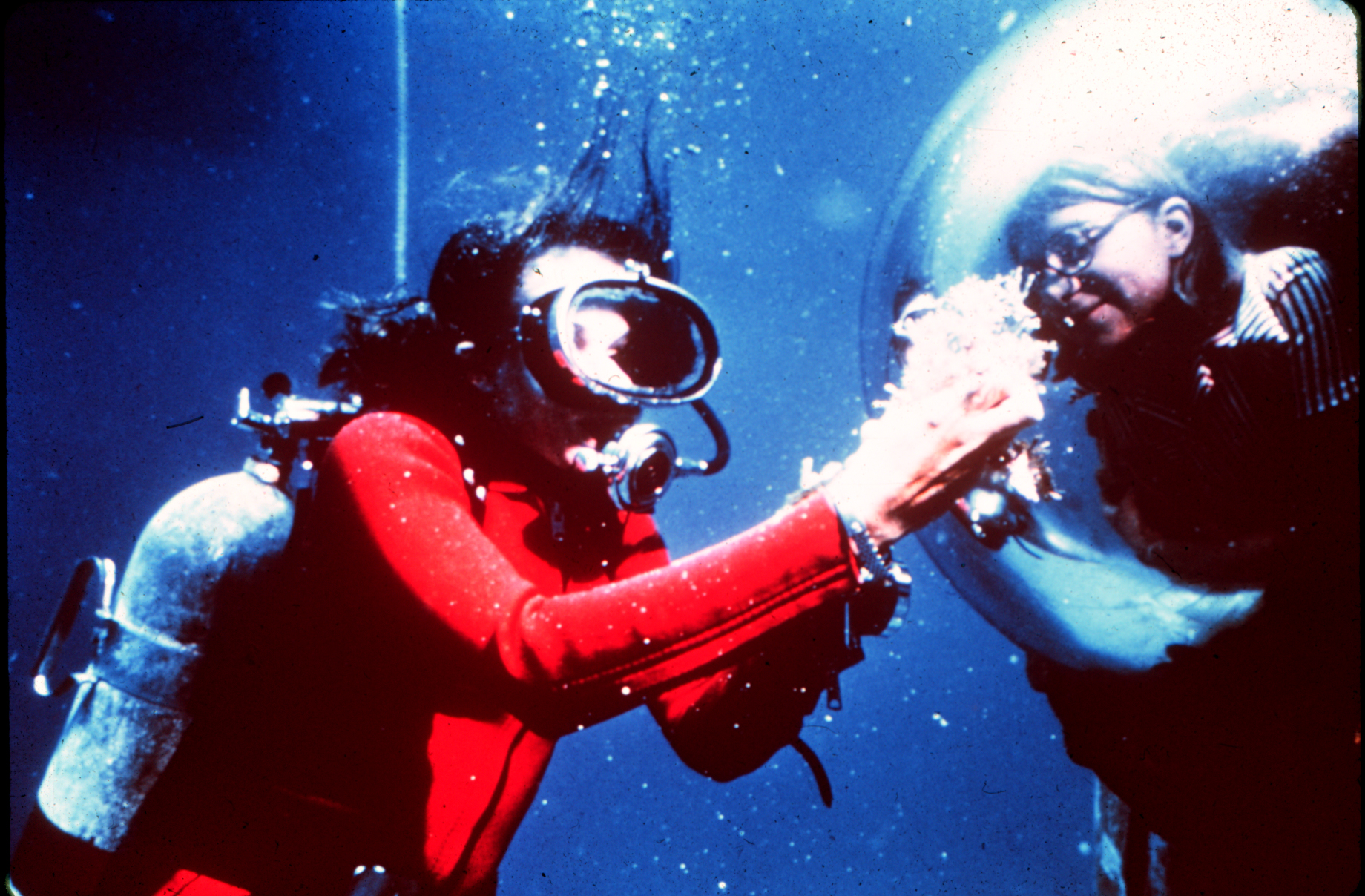
Marine biologist Sylvia Earle, Ph.D. 1966

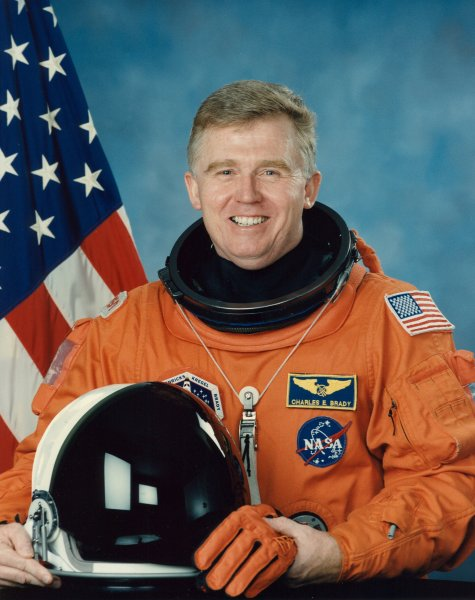
Astronaut Charles E. Brady Jr., M.D. 1975

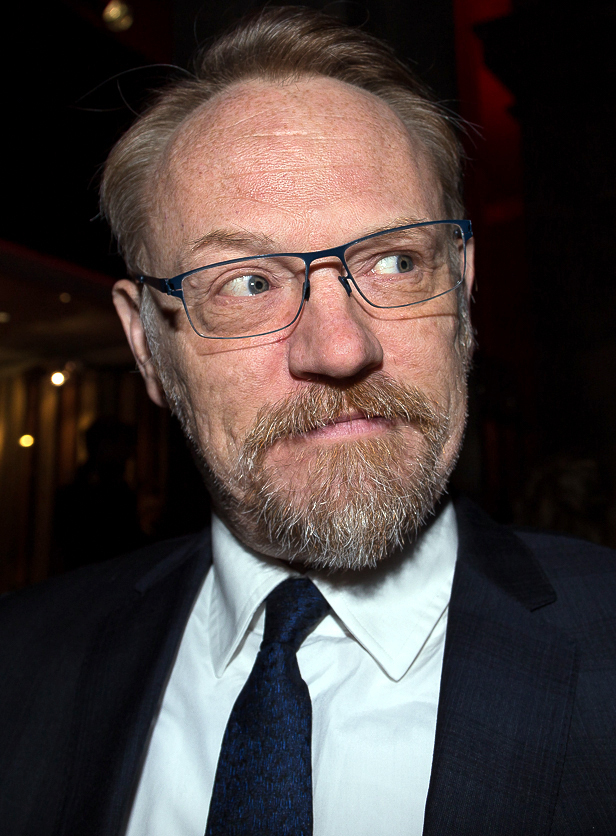
Actor Jared Harris, B.F.A. 1984

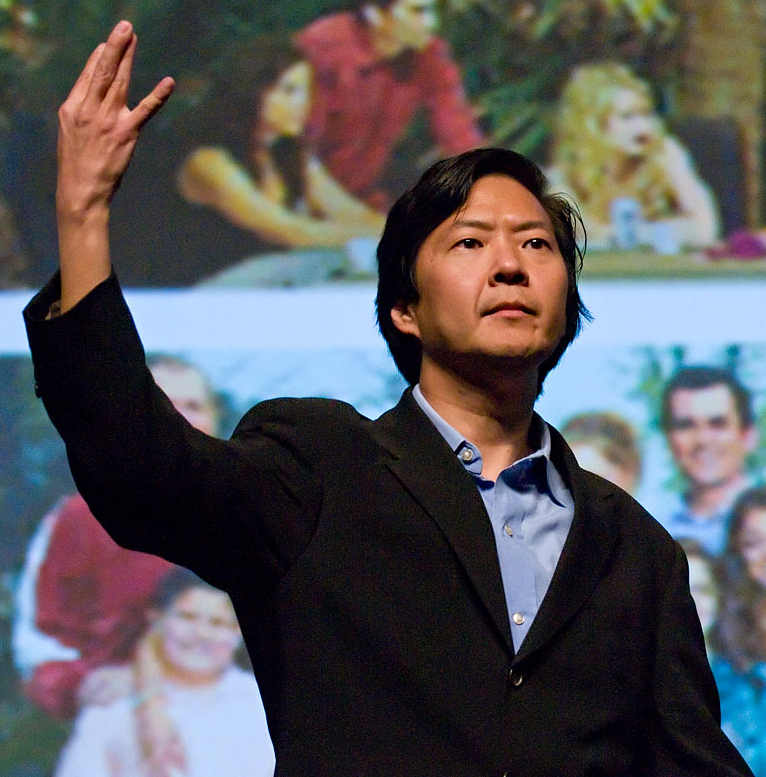
Actor and comedian Ken Jeong, B.S. 1990

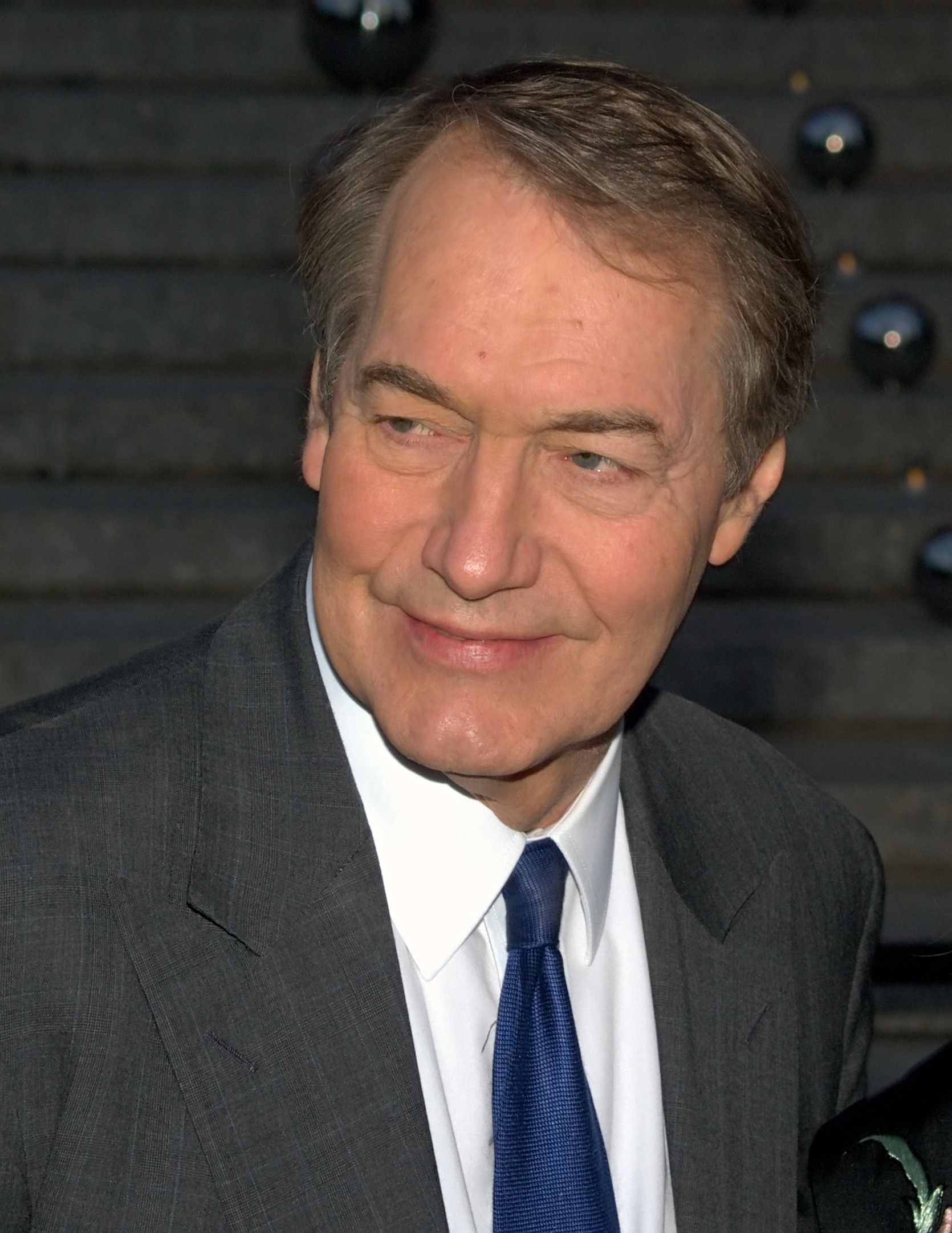
Television journalist Charlie Rose, A.B. 1964, J.D. 1968

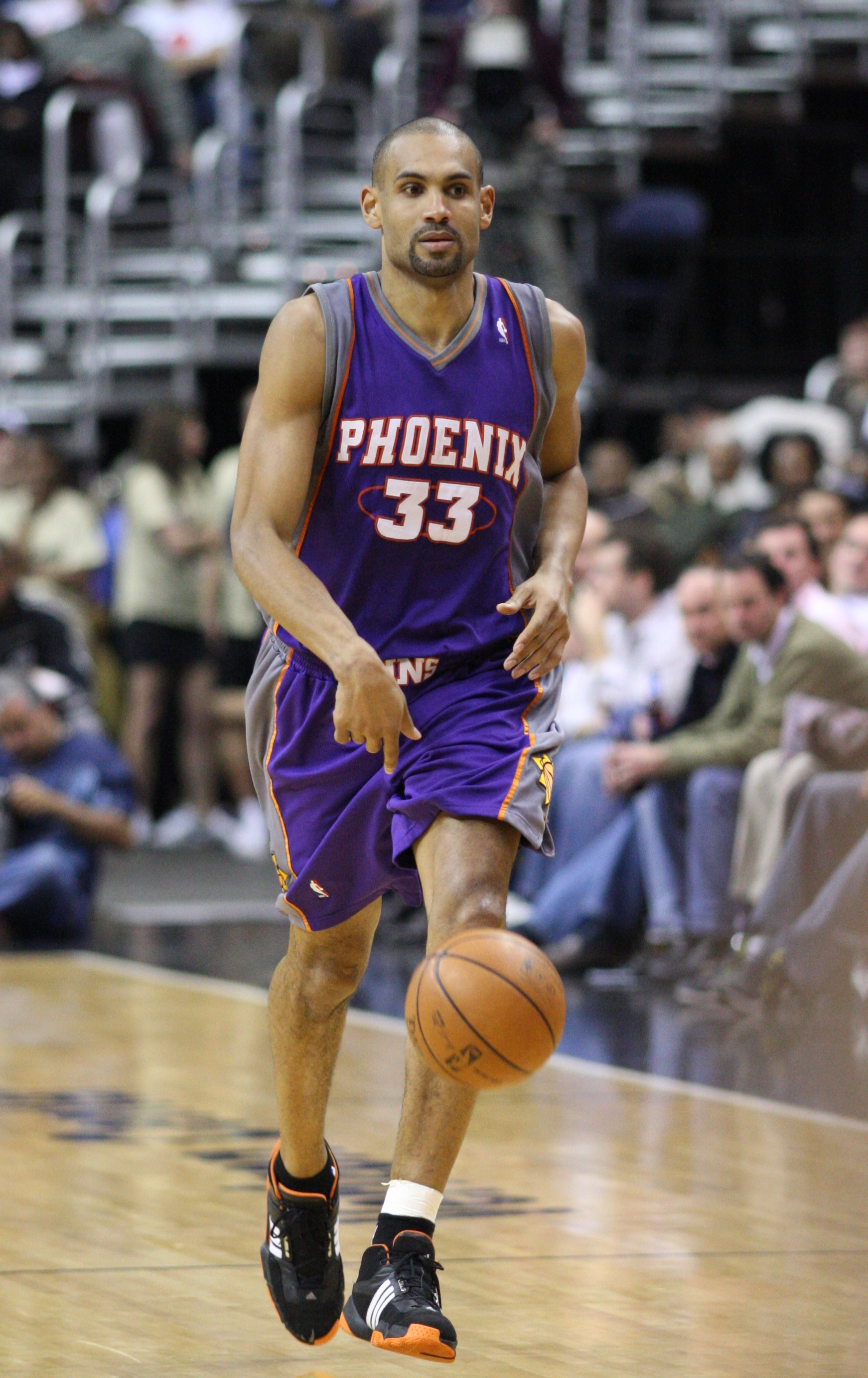
Two-time NCAA Champion, seven-time NBA All-Star Grant Hill, B.A. 1994

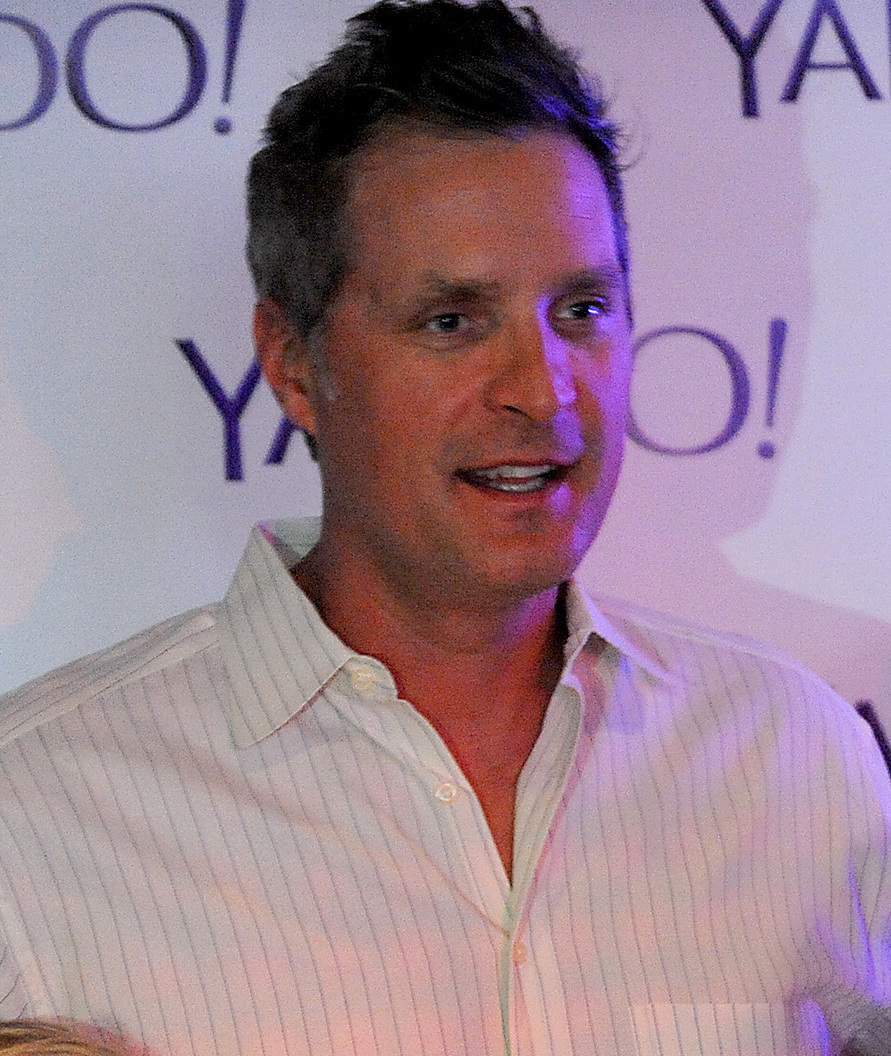
Two-time NCAA Champion, NBA All-Star Christian Laettner, B.A. 1992

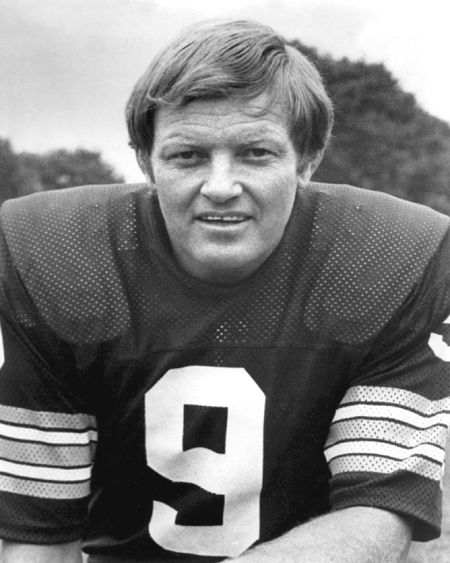
Five-time Pro Bowler, Super Bowl Champion Sonny Jurgensen

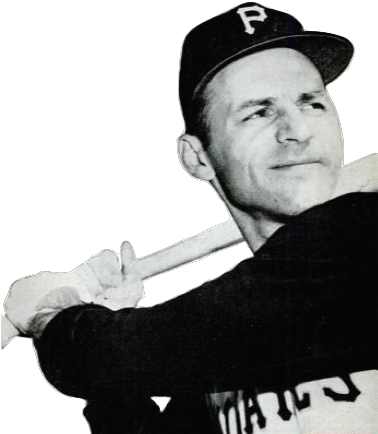
Eight-time MLB All-Star, two-time World Series Champion Dick Groat

Note: individuals who belong in multiple sections appear in the most relevant section.

=== Heads of state ===
- Ricardo Lagos (Ph.D. 1966), former president of Chile
- Richard Nixon (J.D. 1937), 37th president of the United States

=== Cabinet members and White House staff ===
- David Addington (J.D. 1981), chief of staff to former vice president Dick Cheney
- Claude Allen (J.D. 1990), White House domestic policy advisor
- Josephus Daniels, secretary of the Navy during World War I
- Elizabeth Dole (A.B. 1958), former U.S. senator for North Carolina; former commissioner of the Federal Trade Commission; former United States secretary of transportation; former United States secretary of labor; former president of the American Red Cross
- W. Neil Eggleston (A.B. 1975), White House counsel under President Barack Obama
- Danielle C. Gray (A.B. 2000), cabinet secretary, senior advisor to President Barack Obama
- John P. Hannah (A.B. 1984), assistant for National Security to former vice president Dick Cheney
- John Hillen (A.B. 1988), former assistant secretary of state for political-military affairs
- John Koskinen (A.B. 1961), commissioner of Internal Revenue (2013–2017), former deputy director of the White House Office of Management and Budget
- Juanita M. Kreps (A.M. 1944, Ph.D. 1948), United States secretary of commerce, 1977–79
- Reggie Love (A.B. 2005), personal aide to President Barack Obama
- Derek Lyons (A.B. 2004, B.S. 2004), White House staff secretary and counselor to President Donald J. Trump
- Stephen Miller (A.B. 2007), senior advisor to former President Donald Trump
- Macon Phillips (A.B. 2000), White House director of New Media with oversight responsibility for Whitehouse.gov
- Daniel Calhoun Roper (A.B. 1888), United States secretary of commerce under Franklin Delano Roosevelt
- Sonal Shah (M.A. 1994), director of the White House Office of Social Innovation and Civic Participation, former head of the Global Development Initiative at Google.org
- Eric Shinseki (A.M. 1976), retired four-star general, 7th U.S. secretary of veterans affairs (2009–2014), 34th chief of staff of the Army (1999–2003)
- Daleep Singh (A.B. 1997), deputy National Security advisor to President Joseph R. Biden
- Doug Sosnik (A.B. 1979), senior advisor and political director to former President Bill Clinton
- Tommy Sowers (A.B. 1998), assistant secretary for Public and Intergovernmental Affairs
- Kenneth Starr (J.D. 1973), former United States solicitor general, independent counsel during the Whitewater Affair
- Jared Weinstein (A.B. 2002), personal assistant to former President George W. Bush
- Daniel I. Werfel (M.P.P. 1997), commissioner of the Internal Revenue Service
- James Young (M.D. 1955), MC USN, attending White House physician to Kennedy and Johnson, 1963–1966
- Jeffrey Zients (B.S. 1988), U.S. chief performance officer (2009–2013); White House chief of staff

=== Members of Congress ===
==== U.S. senators ====
- Angela Alsobrooks (A.B. 1993), U.S. senator from Maryland
- Shelley Moore Capito (A.B. 1975), U.S. senator from West Virginia, former U.S. representative for West Virginia's 2nd congressional district
- Mo Cowan (A.B. 1991), former U.S. senator from Massachusetts
- Elizabeth Dole (A.B. 1958), former U.S. senator for North Carolina; former commissioner of the Federal Trade Commission; former United States secretary of transportation; former United States secretary of labor; former president of the American Red Cross
- Edward Gurney (LL.M. 1948), former U.S. senator from Florida
- Everett Jordan (A.B.), former U.S. senator from North Carolina
- Ted Kaufman (B.S.E. 1960), U.S. senator of Delaware
- Bob Krueger (A.M. 1959), former U.S. representative and senator from Texas
- Lee Slater Overman (A.B. 1874), former U.S. senator from North Carolina
- Rand Paul (M.D. 1988), U.S. senator from Kentucky
- James B. Pearson (A.B. 1942), U.S. senator from Kansas

==== U.S. representatives ====
- Hugh Quincy Alexander (1932), former U.S. representative from North Carolina (1953–1963)
- Robert Franklin Armfield, former congressman from North Carolina, lieutenant governor of North Carolina
- Morris Brooks (A.B. 1975), former U.S. representative for Alabama's 5th congressional district
- Maurice G. Burnside (Ph.D. 1937), former congressman from West Virginia
- Bradley Byrne (A.B. 1977), U.S. representative for Alabama's 1st congressional district
- Jim Courter (J.D. 1966), former congressman from New Jersey
- Nick Galifianakis (A.B. 1951, J.D. 1953), U.S. representative from North Carolina (1967–1973)
- Lisa Gladden (A.B. 1986), Maryland state representative, Annapolis, Maryland
- Hannibal Lafayette Godwin (A.B. 1897), Democratic U.S. representative from North Carolina
- Tom Grady (J.D., 1982), Republican U.S. representative from Florida
- Robin Hayes (A.B. 1967), congressman of North Carolina's 8th district (1998–present)
- Paul B. Henry (A.M., Ph.D. 1968), U.S. representative from Michigan and Michigan state senator
- Henry Hyde (X. 1947), former U.S. representative of Illinois
- Bob Inglis (A.B. 1981), U.S. representative of South Carolina
- Erica Lee Carter (M.P.P. 2006), U.S. representative for Texas's 18th congressional district (2024–present)
- Mike Levin (J.D. 2005), U.S. representative for California's 49th congressional district (2018–present)
- Dan Lipinski (Ph.D. 1998), congressman for Illinois' 3rd district (2005–present)
- Stan Lundine (A.B. 1961), congressman from New York (1976–1987)
- Denise Majette (J.D. 1979), former Georgia state judge, former U.S. representative of Georgia
- Ron Paul (M.D. 1961), U.S. representative from Texas (1997–2013); 2008 Republican presidential candidate
- Scott Peters (A.B. 1980), U.S. representative for California's 52nd congressional district
- Ben Quayle (A.B, 1998), U.S. representative from Arizona; son of former U.S. vice president Dan Quayle
- Nick Rahall (A.B. 1971), congressman for West Virginia (1977–2015)
- Dave Trott (J.D. 1985), U.S. representative from Michigan (2015–2019)
- Basil Lee Whitener (J.D. 1937), U.S. representative from North Carolina (1957–1968)

=== Governors ===
- R. Gregg Cherry (A.B. 1913), governor of North Carolina (1945–1949)
- Eric Greitens (A.B. 1996), governor of Missouri (2017–2018)
- Claude R. Kirk Jr. (B.S.), governor of Florida (1967–1971)
- JB Pritzker (A.B. 1987), governor of Illinois (2018–present)
- William B. Umstead (J.D 1921), governor of North Carolina (1953–1954)
- Bob Wise (A.B. 1970), governor of West Virginia (2001–2005)

=== Diplomats ===
- George Venable Allen (A.B. 1920), U.S. ambassador to Iran, 1946–1948; assistant secretary of state for Public Affairs, 1948–1949; U.S. ambassador to Yugoslavia, 1949–1953
- Todd C. Chapman (A.B. 1983), U.S. ambassador to Ecuador (2016–2019); U.S. ambassador to Brazil (2020–2021)
- Robert Sherwood Dillon (A.B. 1951), U.S. ambassador to Lebanon (1981–1983)
- William Eacho (A.B. 1976), U.S. ambassador to Austria (2009–2013)
- Cynthia G. Efird (A.M.), U.S. ambassador to Angola (2004–2007)
- Robert C. Frasure (Ph.D 1971), U.S. ambassador to Estonia (1992–1994)
- Gordon D. Giffin (A.B. 1971), U.S. ambassador to Canada (1997–2001)
- Mark Gitenstein (A.B. 1968), former U.S. ambassador to Romania, President Biden's nominee for ambassador to the European Union
- Richard Graber (A.B. 1978), former United States ambassador to the Czech Republic
- Jaime Aleman Healy (J.D. 1978), Panamanian ambassador to the USA (2009–2011)
- Stuart E. Jones (A.B. 1982), United States ambassador to Jordan (2011–2014); United States ambassador to Iraq (2014–present)
- Robert Jordan (A.B. 1967), former United States ambassador to Saudi Arabia
- Bob Krueger (M.A. 1959), U.S. ambassador to Burundi during the Clinton administration
- Philip Lader (A.B. 1966), ambassador to the United Kingdom, chairman of the WPP Group
- Steven Lett (B.S.E. 1980), diplomat; head of the International Cospas-Sarsat Programme
- Jack F. Matlock Jr. (A.B. 1950), United States ambassador to Czechoslovakia and to the Soviet Union under Ronald Reagan
- Walter P. McConaughy (A.B. 1930), former United States ambassador to Burma, South Korea, Pakistan, and Taiwan
- David McKean (J.D. 1986), U.S. ambassador to Luxembourg (2016–2017), director of Policy Planning (2013–2016)
- Geeta Pasi (A.B. 1984), U.S. ambassador to Djibouti (2011–2017) and Chad (2016–2018)
- Manuel Sager (LL.M. 1985), ambassador of Switzerland to the United States
- Elizabeth Verville (A.B. 1961), deputy assistant secretary of state for political and military affairs

=== Military ===
- Kate Lee Harris Adams (B.F.A., 1941), aviator and member of the Women Airforce Service Pilots during World War II
- William Atwater (M.A., Ph.D. 1982), retired captain in the US Marines; author, historian, and director of the US Army Ordnance Museum
- Walter E. Boomer (B.A. 1960), retired general, former assistant commandant, US Marine Corps, Desert Storm commander; business executive
- Frank Bowman (B.S. 1966), retired admiral, former chief of Naval Personnel, former director of Naval Nuclear Propulsion, US Navy; honorary Knight Commander of the Most Excellent Order of the British Empire (KBE)
- Winston Choo (MA, History), retired lieutenant general, former chief of Defence Force (1974–1992) in the Singapore Armed Forces
- Edward H. Deets (1979), rear admiral in the United States Navy
- Martin E. Dempsey (M.A. 1984), chairman of the Joint Chiefs of Staff
- Charles S. Hamilton (B.S. 1974), rear admiral in the United States Navy
- John L. Helgerson (M.S., Ph.D.), former CIA inspector general
- James W. Holsinger (M.D. 1964), retired major general in the United States Army Reserve, physician, nominated to become the 18th Surgeon General of the United States
- Gilmary M. Hostage III (B.S.E. 1977), United States Air Force four-star general, currently serving as the commander of Air Combat Command
- Vergel L. Lattimore, brigadier general in the Air National Guard
- Ng Jui Ping (MA, History), retired lieutenant general; former chief of Defence Force (1992–1995) in the Singapore Armed Forces
- Eric Schoomaker (residency and fellowship), Surgeon General of the United States Army
- Clarence O. Sherrill, lieutenant colonel during World War I, military aide to Presidents Warren G. Harding and Calvin Coolidge
- Eric Shinseki (A.M. 1976), retired four-star general, 7th U.S. secretary of veterans affairs; 34th chief of staff of the Army
- Michael J. Silah (A.B. 1992), rear admiral in the National Oceanic and Atmospheric Administration Commissioned Officer Corps, director, NOAA Commissioned Officer Corps, and director, NOAA Office of Marine and Aviation Operations
- Kevin R. Slates, retired rear admiral in the United States Navy
- Blake Wayne Van Leer (B.S. 1945), commander and captain in the U.S. Navy; led SeaBee program and the nuclear research and power unit at McMurdo Station during Operation Deep Freeze
- Brett Velicovich, Fox News contributor, former United States Army intelligence

=== Law ===
==== Judges ====
- James P. Bassett (L.L.M. 2023), associate justice, New Hampshire Supreme Court
- Cheri Beasley (L.L.M. 2018), chief justice, North Carolina Supreme Court
- Scott Brister (A.B. 1977), former justice, Texas Supreme Court
- Patricia E. Campbell-Smith (B.S. 1987), former chief judge, United States Court of Federal Claims under President Barack Obama
- Aileen Cannon (A.B. 2003), United States district judge of the United States District Court for the Southern District of Florida
- J. Michelle Childs (L.L.M. 2016), United States district judge of the United States District Court for the District of South Carolina
- Robert L. Clifford (L.L.B. 1950), former associate justice, New Jersey Supreme Court
- Ann Covington (A.B. 1963), former chief justice, Missouri Supreme Court
- Laura Crane (A.B. 2003), nominated by President Biden to serve as a judge of the Superior Court of the District of Columbia
- Michael Dreeben (J.D. 1981), deputy solicitor general
- Allyson Duncan (J.D. 1975), judge, United States Court of Appeals for the Fourth Circuit
- Christine M. Durham (J.D. 1971), former chief justice, Utah Supreme Court
- Orinda Evans (A.B. 1965), senior judge, United States District Court for the Northern District of Georgia
- Richard Mark Gergel (A.B. 1975, J.D. 1979), judge, United States District Court for the District of South Carolina
- Karen L. Henderson (A.B. 1966), judge, United States Court of Appeals for the District of Columbia Circuit
- Todd M. Hughes (A.M. 1992, J.D. 1992), judge, United States Court of Appeals for the Federal Circuit
- Susan Illston (A.B. 1970), senior judge, United States District Court for the Northern District of California
- Barbara Jackson (L.L.M. 2014), associate justice, North Carolina Supreme Court
- Jeffrey W. Johnson (B.A. 1982), associate justice, California Court of Appeal
- Jill Karofsky (B.A. 1988), justice of the Wisconsin Supreme Court
- Jane L. Kelly (A.B. 1987), judge, United States Court of Appeals for the Eighth Circuit
- Timothy J. Kelly (A.B. 1991), judge, United States District Court for the District of Columbia
- Kathryn Hackett King (A.B. 2003), justice of the Arizona Supreme Court
- Denise Majette (J.D. 1979), former Georgia state judge; former United States representative of Georgia
- Michael R. Morgan (A.B. 1976), associate justice, North Carolina Supreme Court
- David Nahmias (A.B. 1986), associate justice, Supreme Court of Georgia; former US attorney for the Northern District of Georgia
- Paul Martin Newby (A.B. 1977), chief justice, North Carolina Supreme Court
- Susan Owens (A.B. 1971), associate justice, Washington Supreme Court
- William H. Pauley III (A.B. 1974, J.D. 1977), judge, United States District Court for the Southern District of New York
- Cary Douglas Pugh (A.B. 1987), judge, United States Tax Court
- Robin L. Rosenberg (J.D. 1989), judge, United States District Court for the Southern District of Florida
- Allison Jones Rushing (J.D. 2007), United States circuit judge of the United States Court of Appeals for the Fourth Circuit
- Veronica M. Sanchez (A.B. 1996), nominated by President Biden to serve as a judge of the Superior Court of the District of Columbia
- Vijay Shanker (A.B. 1994), nominated by President Joseph Biden to serve on the District of Columbia Court of Appeals
- Gary Stein (A.B. 1954, J.D. 1956), former associate justice, New Jersey Supreme Court
- Michael B. Thornton (J.D. 1982), former chief judge, United States Tax Court
- Patricia Timmons-Goodson (L.L.M. 2014), former associate justice, North Carolina Supreme Court
- Gerald B. Tjoflat (L.L.B. 1957), chief judge emeritus, U.S. Court of Appeals for the 11th Circuit
- John M. Tyson (M.B.A. 1988), judge, North Carolina Court of Appeals
- Peter Verniero (J.D. 1984), associate justice, New Jersey Supreme Court; former attorney general of New Jersey
- Justin R. Walker (A.B. 2004), judge, United States Court of Appeals for the District of Columbia Circuit
- Charles K. Wiggins (J.D. 1976), justice, Washington Supreme Court
- Don Willett (A.M. 1992, J.D. 1992), judge, United States Court of Appeals for the Fifth Circuit

=== Attorneys ===
- Ward Armstrong (B.A. 1977), lawyer and politician
- Charlie Condon (J.D. 1978), former attorney general of South Carolina
- Jack Conway (A.B. 1991), former attorney general of Kentucky
- Eric Dick (M.S. 2023), lawyer and president of the Harris County Department of Education since 2017, known for specializing in resolving property insurance claim disputes
- Robert Dove (Ph.D. 1964), parliamentarian of the United States Senate
- Marc Elias (J.D. 1993, M.A. 1993), founding partner at Elias Law Group LLP, general counsel for Hillary Clinton's 2016 presidential campaign and for John Kerry's 2004 presidential campaign
- Jeffrey L. Fisher (A.B. 1992), professor at Stanford Law School
- John Harmon (J.D. 1969), former United States assistant attorney general for the Office of Legal Counsel
- Stanley Hilton (J.D. 1975), lawyer and activist
- Larry Klayman (A.B. 1973), public interest lawyer
- Jeffrey Lichtman (J.D. 1990), defense attorney for John Gotti, Fat Joe, and The Game
- Andrew G. McCabe (A.B. 1990), former acting director of the Federal Bureau of Investigation
- Dan McCarthy (J.D. 1983), chief prosecutor of the Judge Advocate General's Corps of the United States Navy
- Doha Mekki (B.A.), former acting assistant attorney general for the Department of Justice Antitrust Division
- Eric Miller (B.A., 1992), US attorney for Vermont
- C. Allen Parker, presiding partner at Cravath, Swaine & Moore
- Wilhelmina Reuben-Cooke (A.B. 1967), professor of law at the University of the District of Columbia, one of the first five African-American undergraduates admitted to Duke in 1963
- Charles S. Rhyne, lawyer who argued landmark case Baker v. Carr
- Russell M. Robinson II (L.L.B. 1956), founding partner of Robinson, Bradshaw & Hinson, P.A.
- Eric Rothschild (A.B. 1989), lead attorney for Kitzmiller v. Dover Area School District
- D. John Sauer (A.B., B.S. 1997), solicitor general of the United States
- Susan Scafidi (A.B.), founder and president of the Fashion Law Institute, a nonprofit organization located at the Fordham University School of Law in New York City
- Rodney A. Smolla (J.D. 1978), author; first amendment scholar; 11th president of Furman University
- Ellen Stiefler (A.B. 1980), intellectual property attorney
- Zephyr Teachout (A.M. 1999, J.D. 1999), associate professor of law at Fordham University, candidate for the Democratic Party nomination for governor of New York

=== Public policy ===
- John H. Adams (J.D. 1962), co-founder of the Natural Resources Defense Council
- Maya Ajmera (M.P.P. 1993), founder and president of The Global Fund for Children
- Barbara Arnwine (J.D. 1976), executive director of the Lawyers' Committee for Civil Rights Under Law 1989–2015
- William Barber II (M.Div. 1989), member of the NAACP national board of directors
- Jainey K. Bavishi (A.B. 2003), assistant secretary of commerce
- Mary Duke Biddle (A.B. 1907), daughter of Benjamin Newton Duke and Sarah Pearson Angier Duke, founder of the Mary Duke Biddle Foundation
- Lisa Borders (A.B. 1979), chair of the Coca-Cola Foundation; vice president of Global Community Affairs at the Coca-Cola Company
- Charlotte Bunch (A.B. 1966), author and human rights activist
- Benjamin Chavis Jr. (MDiv 1980), civil rights activist, executive director of the NAACP
- Dave A. Chokshi (A.B. 2003), health commissioner of New York City
- Eugene A. Conti Jr. (M.A. public policy, Ph.D. anthropology 1978), asst. secretary USDOT, secretary of transportation, NCDOT
- Peter Cook (A.B. 1989), Pentagon press secretary for Defense Secretary Ash Carter
- Pete Crossland (Ph.D. 1966), former member of the Ohio House of Representatives
- Chris Daly, former member of the San Francisco Board of Supervisors
- Marjorie Dannenfelser (A.B. 1988), president of the Susan B. Anthony List, an organization that seeks to advance anti-abortion women in politics
- Marisa T. Darden (J.D. 2008), nominee to serve as United States attorney for the Northern District of Ohio
- Chris Dorworth (M.B.A. 2006), member of the Florida House of Representatives
- Allan Fels (Ph.D.), chairperson of the Australian Competition & Consumer Commission
- Nelson M. Ford (B.A.), former U.S. under secretary of the Army
- Andrew Giuliani (A.B. 2009), Special Assistant to the President and associate director of the Office of Public Liaison for President Donald Trump
- Susan M. Gordon (B.S. 1980), principal deputy director of National Intelligence in the Office of the director of National Intelligence and deputy director of the National Geospatial-Intelligence Agency
- Josh Hammer (B.S. 2011), columnist and political commentator
- John Hanger (A.B. 1979), Pennsylvania secretary of Environmental Protection, candidate for governor of Pennsylvania
- Suhani Jalota (A.B. 2016), social activist
- Deborah Lee James (A.B. 1979), U.S. secretary of the Air Force
- Shavar Jeffries (A.B. 1996), civil rights attorney, candidate for mayor of Newark, New Jersey
- Jerry Meek (A.B. 1993, J.D. 1997), chairman of the North Carolina Democratic Party
- Kimeli Wilson Naiyomah (M.I.D.P,), Kenyan author
- Neil Newhouse (A.B. 1974), Republican pollster
- Brendan Nyhan (Ph.D. 2009), author and political columnist
- Jesse Panuccio (A.B. 2003), former acting associate attorney general of the United States
- Muhammad Ali Pate (M.B.A. 2006), former Minister of State for Health in Nigeria
- Art Pope (J.D. 1981), budget director for North Carolina Governor Pat McCrory
- Celeste Rohlfing (Ph.D u.d.), deputy assistant director of the National Science Foundation
- Robert Satloff (A.B. 1983), executive director of the Washington Institute for Near East Policy
- Mary Duke Biddle Trent Semans (A.B. 1939), philanthropist
- Eleanor Smeal (A.B. 1961, LL.D 1991), political activist; president of the Feminist Majority Foundation; former president of the National Organization for Women
- Margaret Taylor Smith (A.B. 1947), chair, board of trustees, Kresge Foundation
- Damon Wilson (A.B. 1995), executive vice president at the Atlantic Council of the United States, former senior director for European affairs at the National Security Council
- Howard Wolfson (M.A. 1991), Democratic political strategist, deputy mayor of New York City for governmental affairs

=== Mayors ===
- Jessica Anderson (MPP), mayor of Chapel Hill, North Carolina (2023–present)
- Ed Austin (A.B. 1948), mayor of Jacksonville (1991–1995)
- Bill Campbell (J.D. 1977), mayor of Atlanta (1994–2002)
- J. Kane Ditto (A.B.), mayor of Jackson, Mississippi (1989–1997)
- Vijayalakshmi Gadwal, mayor of Hyderabad, India (2021–present)
- Rob Harrington (B.A. 1984, J.D. 1987), mayor of Charlotte, North Carolina (2026–present)
- Sylvia Kerckhoff (M.A. 1960), mayor of Durham, North Carolina (1993–1997)
- Stan Lundine (A.B. 1961), former mayor of Jamestown, former congressman and lieutenant governor of New York
- Enrique Peñalosa (A.B. 1978), mayor of Bogotá, Colombia (1998–2000, 2016–2019)
- Steve Schewel (A.B. 1973, Ph.D. 1982), mayor of Durham, North Carolina (2017–2021)
- Nick Tennyson (A.B. 1972), mayor of Durham (1997–2001)

=== State officials ===
- Austin M. Allran (A.B. 1974), member of the North Carolina General Assembly
- Dan Blue (J.D.), former member of the North Carolina House of Representatives, 1981–2002
- Bob Blumenfield (B.A. 1989), current Los Angeles City Council member, former California State Assembly member, 2009–2013
- Susan Bysiewicz (J.D. 1986), 109th lieutenant governor of Connecticut
- Samuel Bogley (A.B), former lieutenant governor of Maryland
- F. Vernon Boozer (A.B 1958), former member of Maryland Senate, 1981–1999
- Jason Carter (A.B. 1997), Democratic Party nominee for governor of Georgia; member of the Georgia State Senate; grandson of President Jimmy Carter
- Mike Connolly (B.A. 2003), member of the Massachusetts House of Representatives
- Leslie Cooley Dismukes, secretary for the North Carolina Department of Adult Correction
- Cerina Fairfax (B.S. 1999), Second Lady of Virginia
- Justin Fairfax (A.B. 2000), lieutenant governor of Virginia
- J. B. Fuqua (G.Hon 1973), chairman of the Georgia Democratic Party
- Raj Goyle (A.B. 1997), candidate for New York State Comptroller, former state representative
- Ember Reichgott Junge (J.D. 1977), former state senator from Minnesota
- Herb Kirsh, former member of the South Carolina House of Representatives
- Bill Kramer (J.D. 1994), former majority leader, Wisconsin State Assembly
- Floyd McKissick Jr. (J.D. 1983), member of the North Carolina Senate
- Evelyn Murphy (A.B. 1965, Ph.D. 1981), former lieutenant governor of Massachusetts
- Robert Sheheen (A.B. 1965), former speaker, South Carolina House of Representatives
- Lura S. Tally (A.B. 1942), member of the North Carolina House of Representatives, 1973–1983, and the North Carolina Senate, 1983–1995
- Mike Turzai (J.D. 1987), nominee for speaker of the Pennsylvania House Representatives, former Republican Caucus (majority) leader
- Merle Davis Umstead (B.A. 1926), First Lady of North Carolina
- Kelli Ward (B.S. 1991), former state senator from Arizona
- Scott Wiener (B.A. 1992), member of the California State Senate

=== Foreign officials ===
- Lekso Aleksishvili (M.A. 2004), former Georgian minister of finance
- Michael Bassett (Ph.D. 1961), former cabinet minister and member of the Parliament of New Zealand
- Arkady Dvorkovich (M.S. 1997), Russian deputy prime minister for industry and energy, former chief economic advisor to Russian President Dmitry Medvedev
- Amit Mitra (Ph.D. 1978), finance minister of the Indian State of West Bengal; economist; member of the West Bengal Legislative Assembly
- Samir Nuriyev (MIDP 2005), head of the Presidential Administration of Azerbaijan
- Selim Selimi (MIDP 2010), former Kosovo Minister of Justice
- Aditi Singh (M.M.S. 2013), member of the Uttar Pradesh Legislative Assembly
- David Usupashvili (M.A. 1999), chairperson of the Parliament of Georgia

=== Foreign royalty and nobility ===
- Hashim bin Al Hussein (X), prince of Jordan
- Sheikha Al-Mayassa bint Hamad bin Khalifa Al-Thani (B.A. 2005), 14th child of Sheikh Hamad bin Khalifa Al Thani, the former emir of Qatar
- Sheikha Hind bint Hamad bin Khalifa Al Thani, daughter of Sheikh Hamad bin Khalifa Al Thani
- Prince Charles-Henri de Lobkowicz (B.A.), third son of Prince Edouard de Lobkowicz and Princess Marie-Françoise of Bourbon-Parma

=== Other ===
- Paul Auerbach (B.S. 1973, M.D. 1977), physician; a leading voice in the area of wilderness medicine; founder and past president of the Wilderness Medical Society
- Bernard Chan Pak-li (Ph.D. 2003), Ping Shek representative in the Kwun Tong District Council of Hong Kong, 2007–2013
- D. Todd Christofferson (J.D. 1972), member of the Quorum of the Twelve Apostles of the Church of Jesus Christ of Latter-day Saints
- Patricia Wright Gwyn (B.A. 1951), First Lady of Reidsville, first female chair of the Rockingham County Board of Commissioners
- Ken Harbaugh (B.S. 1996), president of Team Rubicon
- Jillian Johnson (B.A. 2003), mayor pro tempore of Durham, North Carolina
- Kevin J. Martin (M.P.P. 1993), chairman of the Federal Communications Commission
- Yasmeen Mjalli (M.A.), fashion designer, photographer and anti-street harassment activist
- Charlie Soong (X. 1881), Duke's first international student and patriarch of the Soong Dynasty
- Daniel Tarullo (M.A. 1974), member of the board of governors of the United States Federal Reserve, Nomura Professor of International Financial Regulatory Practice at Harvard Law School
- Paul Teller (B.A. 1993), executive director of the United States House of Representatives Republican Study Committee
- Alexander Volzhin, Russian chess grandmaster
- Frederic Whitehurst (Ph.D. 1980), former supervisory special agent in the FBI Laboratory
- Mike Woodard (A.B. 1981), Durham, North Carolina City Council member

=== Business ===
- Shaikha Al-Bahar, CEO of the National Bank of Kuwait; named the 85th most powerful woman in the world by Forbes
- John A. Allison IV (M.B.A. 1974), chairman (and former CEO), BB&T
- John Angelos, executive vice president of the Baltimore Orioles
- Steven Black (A.B. 1974), vice-chairman, JPMorgan Chase & Co., chairman of Wells Fargo
- Roy J. Bostock (A.B. 1962), former chairman of Bcom3 Group, Inc.; namesake of Bostock Library
- Wallace E. Boston Jr. (A.B. 1974), president and chief executive officer, American Public University System
- Jack O. Bovender Jr. (A.B. 1967, MHA 1969), chairman and CEO of HCA
- Jonathan Browning (M.B.A.), CEO of Volkswagen Group of America
- Lewis B. Campbell (B.S.E. 1968), CEO of Textron
- John Canning Jr., founder of private equity firm Madison Dearborn Partners; co-owner of the Milwaukee Brewers
- John Chambers (attended 1967–1968; X. 1968), CEO of Cisco Systems
- Mickey Conlon (A.B., 1998), celebrity real estate broker and star of HGTV's reality television series Selling New York
- Tim Cook (M.B.A. 1988), CEO of Apple Inc.
- Eddy Cue (B.S.), Apple's senior vice president of Internet Software and Services
- Husein Cumber (A.B. 1997), Chief Strategy Officer of Florida East Coast Industries (FECI)
- Tom Davin (B.A. 1979), former COO of Taco Bell Corporation and CEO of Panda Restaurant Group
- Grant DePorter (M.B.A.), restaurateur
- Chad Dickerson (A.B. 1993), CEO of Etsy
- Gary Dickinson (B.S. 1960), automotive industry executive
- Fred Ehrsam (B.S. 2010), co-founder of Coinbase
- Clay Felker (A.B. 1951), founding editor of New York Magazine
- Jeffrey Fox (B.S. 1984), president and CEO of Convergys
- Heath Freeman (A.B. 2002), managing director of Alden Global Capital
- J. B. Fuqua (G.Hon 1973), chairman of the board of the Fuqua Companies, founder of the J.B. Fuqua Foundation, namesake of Duke's Fuqua School of Business
- Pat Garrity (M.B.A. 2011), former professional basketball player and investment professional
- Melinda Gates (A.B. 1986, M.B.A. 1987), co-founder of the Gates Foundation
- David Gibbs (M.B.A. 1988), former CEO, Pizza Hut; CEO, Yum! Brands
- David R. Goode (A.B. 1962), chairman, president, and CEO of Norfolk Southern
- William H. Gross (B.S. 1966), founder and chief investment officer, PIMCO, the world's largest bond fund
- Brian Hamilton (M.B.A. 1990), co-founder and former chairman, Sageworks; founder, Inmates to Entrepreneurs
- Jonathan Harmsworth, 4th Viscount Rothermere (A.B. 1991), British viscount; chairman of the Evening Standard and the Daily Mail
- Gerald Hassell (B.A. 1973), chairman and CEO, Bank of New York Mellon
- William A. Hawkins (B.S. 1976), CEO of Medtronic
- Sally Hogshead (B.A. 1991), CEO of Fascinate, Inc.
- Betsy Holden (A.B.), CEO of Kraft Foods, 2001–2003
- Amy Hood (A.B. 1994), first female CFO of Microsoft
- John Idzik Jr. (A.M. 1993), former general manager of the NFL's New York Jets
- David Bronson Ingram (A.B. 1985), chairman of Ingram Entertainment
- W. Bruce Johnson (B.A., J.D., M.B.A.), interim chief executive officer and president, Sears Holdings Corporation
- William D. Johnson (B.A.), chairman, president and CEO of Progress Energy
- Tom Kain (A.B. 1986), Nike's director of Global Marketing (soccer)
- Bruce Karsh (A.B. 1977), co-founder and president of Oaktree Capital Management
- Chris Kempczinski (A.B. 1991), CEO of McDonald's
- Lesa Kennedy (B.A. 1983), CEO of International Speedway Corporation; member of the board of directors of NASCAR
- Zach Kleiman (J.D. 2013), general manager of the Memphis Grizzlies; 2022 NBA Executive of the Year
- David Kohler (B.A.), president and CEO of Kohler Company
- John A. Koskinen (A.B. 1961), president of US Soccer Foundation, former deputy director, Office of Management and Budget
- Michael Lamach (M.B.A.), CEO and chairman of Ingersoll Rand
- David Lauren (A.B., 1993), senior vice president at Polo Ralph Lauren
- Dylan Lauren (A.B., 1996), president and founder of Dylan's Candy Bar
- Howard Lerman (A.B. 2002), founder and CEO of Yext
- Dan Levitan (1979), co-founder and managing partner, Maveron
- Deb Liu (B.S.E), CEO of Ancestry.com
- Liu Ruopeng (Ph.D. 2009), Chinese billionaire co-founder of Kuang-Chi Group
- Poman Lo (A.B. 1999), founder of Bodhi and Friends
- Gérard Louis-Dreyfus (A.B., J.D.), French billionaire businessman
- Gary Lynch (J.D. 1975), former chief legal officer and vice chairman of Morgan Stanley
- John J. Mack (A.B. 1968), CEO of Morgan Stanley; former CEO of Credit Suisse First Boston
- Aslaug Magnusdottir (LL.M. 1998), Icelandic co-founder and former CEO of Moda Operandi
- Marijke Mars (born 1965), billionaire heiress and businesswoman
- Michael Marsicano (A.B. 1977, M.A. 1978, Ph.D. 1982), president and CEO of the Foundation for the Carolinas
- Mathew Martoma (born 1974 as Ajai Mathew Mariamdani Thomas), hedge fund portfolio manager, convicted of insider trading
- Aubrey McClendon (A.B. 1981), CEO, chairman, and co-founder of Chesapeake Energy
- Dan McCready (B.A. 2005), entrepreneur and candidate for US House of Representatives
- Bart McDade (A.B. 1981), former president and COO of Lehman Brothers, tasked with saving the firm towards the end of its existence
- Hardy McLain (born 1952), hedge fund manager, managing partner CVC Capital Partners
- Lalit Modi (A.B. 1986), Modi Enterprises Scion, chairman and founder of Indian Premier League
- Carter Murray (A.B. 1997), CEO of DraftFCB
- Raymond Nasher (1943), real estate developer, philanthropist, namesake of Duke's Nasher Museum of Art
- Peter Nicholas (A.B. 1964), founder and chairman of Boston Scientific Corporation
- Edward Nixon (B.S. 1952), entrepreneur and last surviving brother of former US President Richard Nixon
- Stephen Pagliuca (1977), part owner of the Boston Celtics, managing director of Bain Capital
- Robert A. Pascal (A.B. 1957), entrepreneur and politician
- Aaron Patzer (B.S.E 2002), founder and CEO of Mint
- J. Michael Pearson (B.S. 1981), chairman and CEO of Valeant Pharmaceuticals
- Hilda Pinnix-Ragland (M.B.A. 1986), first African-American vice president at Progress Energy Inc and Duke Energy
- Edmund T. Pratt Jr. (B.S.E. 1947), former CEO of Pfizer, philanthropist, namesake of Duke's Edmund T. Pratt School of Engineering
- Robert M. Price (B.S. 1952), CEO of the Control Data Corporation
- JB Pritzker (A.B.), managing partner and co-founder of the Pritzker Group, principal owner of Hyatt Hotels Corporation and TransUnion Corporation, one of the 400 richest Americans
- Joanna Rees (B.S.), venture capitalist
- Jeffrey Reich (A.B. 1979), former senior managing director of Bear Stearns
- Mark Reuss (M.B.A. 1990), head of global product development at General Motors; former president of GM North America
- William Neal Reynolds, president of RJ Reynolds Tobacco Company, brother of Richard Joshua Reynolds
- Allard Roen, businessman from Las Vegas, Nevada, and Carlsbad, California
- Andrew Rosen (A.B. 1982), chairman and CEO of Kaplan, Inc.
- Drew Rosenhaus (J.D. 1990), NFL sports agent
- David M. Rubenstein (A.B. 1970), billionaire co-founder of The Carlyle Group
- Adam Silver (B.A. 1984), commissioner and chief operating officer of the NBA
- Georg Schaeffler (J.D. 1999), owner of the Schaeffler Group; currently the wealthiest person in Germany
- Alan Schwartz (A.B. 1972), CEO, Bear Stearns
- Granville Semmes, founder of 1-800-Flowers
- Noam Shazeer (B.S. 1998), co-lead of Google Gemini and vice president of engineering at Google
- Malvinder Mohan Singh (M.B.A. 1998), Indian former chairman and CEO of Ranbaxy Laboratories; chairman of Fortis Hospitals and Religare Financial Services; one of the twenty richest Indians in the world
- Shivinder Mohan Singh (M.B.A. 2000), Indian managing director of Fortis Healthcare; advisory board member of AIESEC India; one of the twenty richest Indians in the world
- David B. Snow Jr. (M.S. 1978), chairman and CEO of Medco Health Solutions, a Fortune 100 company
- Jimmy Soni (A.B. 2007), managing editor of the Huffington Post
- Robert K. Steel (A.B. 1973), chairman of the Duke University Board of Trustees, president and CEO, Wachovia
- Joseph R. Swedish (M.H.A. 1979), CEO of WellPoint (now Anthem), the second-largest health insurance provider in the US
- David S. Taylor (B.S.E 1980), president and CEO at Procter & Gamble
- Jill Tiefenthaler (A.M., Ph.D.), CEO of National Geographic Society
- Bill Timmerman (1968), chairman, president, and CEO of SCANA
- Randall L. Tobias, former CEO of Eli Lilly and Company; served as U.S. director of Foreign Assistance and Administrator of USAID, with the rank of ambassador
- David Trott (J.D. 1985), businessman; Republican politician
- Christian Van Thillo (M.B.A. 1989), CEO of De Persgroep
- Ashok Varadhan (A.B. 1993), co-head of global banking and markets at Goldman Sachs; became one of the firm's youngest partners at the age of 29
- Poornima Vijayashanker (B.S. 2004), entrepreneur and engineer
- James L. Vincent (B.S. 1961), chairman and CEO, Biogen Idec
- Jeffrey Vinik (B.S. 1981), chairman, president, and CEO of Vinik Asset Management, owner of Tampa Bay Lightning
- Karl von der Heyden (1962), German-American vice chairman and CFO, PepsiCo, namesake of the von der Heyden pavilion at Duke
- G. Richard Wagoner Jr. (A.B. 1975), president and CEO, General Motors Corporation
- Charles Xiaolin Wang (J.D. 1999), Chinese lawyer and automotive businessman
- Thomas S. White Jr. (1965), asset manager
- Jeff Williams (M.B.A. 1991), COO of Apple
- Gary L. Wilson (A.B. 1962), director of The Walt Disney Company; co-chairman of Northwest Airlines; namesake of Wilson Rec Center at Duke
- William Wrigley Jr. II (B.A.), chairman, president, CEO Wrigley Company
- Gao Xiqing (J.D. 1986), general manager and chief investment officer of the China Investment Corporation

=== Education ===
==== University presidents and administrators ====
- M. Katherine Banks (Ph.D. 1989), 24th president of Texas A&M University
- Rick Brewer, president of Louisiana College
- Christopher Celenza (Ph.D. 1996), James B. Knapp Dean of the Krieger School of Arts and Sciences at Johns Hopkins University
- John Chandler (B.D. 1952, Ph.D. 1954), former president of Williams College
- Margaret Mordecai Jones Cruikshank (MEd 1937), president of St. Mary's Junior College
- Margaret Cuninggim, dean of women at the University of Tennessee and Vanderbilt University
- Charles L. Flynn Jr. (Ph.D.), president of the College of Mount Saint Vincent
- W. Kent Fuchs (B.S.E. 1977), president of the University of Florida, former provost of Cornell University
- Pamela Gann (J.D. 1973), president of Claremont McKenna College, former dean of Duke University School of Law
- Geoffrey Garrett (Ph.D.), political scientist, dean of the Wharton School of the University of Pennsylvania
- Susan Henking (B.A. 1977), president of Shimer College; scholar of religious studies
- Susan Herbst (B.A. 1984), president of University of Connecticut; political scientist
- Matthew S. Holland (M.A., Ph.D.), president of Utah Valley University
- William Stanley Hoole (Ph.D., 1934), dean emeritus of university libraries, and professor emeritus of library service at the University of Alabama
- A. D. Kirwan (Ph.D., 1947), seventh president of the University of Kentucky
- Benjamin Ladner (Ph.D. 1970), former president of American University
- Samuel Lander (A.M. 1855), founder and first president of Lander University
- Theodore E. Long (A.M 1968), president of Elizabethtown College
- Mirta Martin (B.S. 1982), ninth president of Fort Hays State University
- Lloyd B. Minor (residency), scientist, surgeon, and dean of Stanford University School of Medicine
- Marie Lynn Miranda (B.S., 1985), data scientist, 10th chancellor of the University of Illinois Chicago
- Roy Kinneer Patteson Jr. (Th.M. 1964, Ph.D. 1967), ancient language scholar; authority on the origin of the alphabet; former president of Southern Virginia University and King College
- David P. Roselle (Ph.D. 1965), president, University of Delaware
- David E. Sweet (Ph.D., 1968), founding president of Metropolitan State University and later president of Rhode Island College
- Jill Tiefenthaler (A.M., Ph.D.), former president of Colorado College; former provost of Wake Forest University
- Jeffrey Vitter (M.B.A. 2002), 17th chancellor of the University of Mississippi
- Beth Winkelstein (Ph.D. 1999), deputy provost of the University of Pennsylvania
- Theodore Ziolkowski (A.B. 1951), former dean of the graduate school, Princeton University

==== Professors and academics ====
- Arun Agrawal (M.A. 1988, Ph.D. 1992), professor at the University of Michigan
- R. Michael Alvarez (Ph.D. 1992), professor of political science at the California Institute of Technology
- Dan Ariely (Ph.D. 1998), professor of behavioral economics at Duke and head of the eRationality research group at the MIT Media Lab, author of Predictably Irrational
- Susan Athey (A.B. 1991), professor of economics at Harvard University and winner of the John Bates Clark Medal
- Noël Bakhtian (B.S. 2005), director of the Berkeley Lab Energy Storage Center
- Michael J. Battle (B.A. 1986, Ph.D. 1995), Episcopal moral theologian
- Roy Baumeister (M.A. 1976), psychologist, fellow of the American Academy of Arts and Sciences
- Stephen B. Baylin (B.S., M.D. 1968), Virginia and D.K. Ludwig Professor for Cancer Research at Johns Hopkins University
- Mark F. Bear (B.S. 1979), professor of neuroscience at MIT; member of the National Academy of Medicine
- Sherilynn Black (Ph.D.), neuroscientist and associate vice provost for Faculty Advancement at Duke
- Shree Bose (M.D., Ph.D. 2023), grand prize winner of the inaugural Google Science Fair in 2011
- Susan H. Brandt, historian
- Bill Brown (A.B.), distinguished professor of English at the University of Chicago
- Tomiko Brown-Nagin (Ph.D. 2002), Daniel P.S. Paul Professor of Constitutional Law at Harvard Law School
- Robin M. Canup (B.S.), astrophysicist; member of the National Academy of Sciences; recipient of the Harold C. Urey Prize
- Barry F. Cooper (Ph.D. 1969), Canadian political scientist
- Thomas Daniel (Ph.D.), biologist, won a MacArthur Fellowship in 1996
- Jon Danielsson (Ph.D. 1991), director of the Systemic Risk Centre at the London School of Economics and Political Science
- Sara Danius (Ph.D. 1997), permanent secretary of the Swedish Academy, a Royal Academy which awards the Nobel Prize in Literature
- Kenneth A. Dodge (Ph.D. 1978), William McDougall Professor of Public Policy and professor of psychology and neuroscience at Duke University
- David L. Downie (A.B. 1983), author, professor of politics and environment policy at Fairfield University
- David Efird (A.B. 1995), philosopher and lecturer at the University of York
- Garrett Epps (J.D. 1991), legal scholar, professor at the University of Baltimore
- Thomas Eugene Flanagan (Ph.D.), conservative Canadian political scientist
- R. Edward Freeman (A.B. 1973), philosopher and professor of business administration, known for the stakeholder theory
- Maryellen Fullerton (B.A. 1968), lawyer and interim dean and law professor of law at Brooklyn Law School
- Ken Gergen (Ph.D. 1962), psychologist and professor at Swarthmore College
- John Graham (Ph.D. 1994), economist
- Huck Gutman, Ph.D. from Duke; professor of English at the University of Vermont and political advisor to Bernie Sanders
- Craig Hanks, Ph.D. from Duke; professor of philosophy at Texas State University
- Craig Henriquez (B.S.E., 1981, Ph.D., 1988), professor of biomedical engineering at Duke University
- Dagmar Herzog (A.B., 1983), distinguished professor of history, the Graduate Center, City University of New York
- Douglas Hodgkin (Ph.D.), political scientist; author; professor at Bates College
- D. Kern Holoman (B.A. 1969), Distinguished Professor of Music at the University of California, Davis
- Robert A. Jarrow (B.S. 1974), Ronald P. and Susan E. Lynch Professor of Investment Management at the Johnson Graduate School of Management, Cornell University
- William Kaelin Jr. (A.B. 1978, M.D. 1982), professor of medicine at Harvard University, recipient of the 2016 Albert Lasker Award for Basic Medical Research and the 2019 Nobel Prize in Physiology or Medicine
- Siddharth Kara (B.A.), expert on modern-day slavery and human trafficking
- Kevin Lane Keller (Ph.D. 1986), E. B. Osborn Professor of Marketing at the Tuck School of Business at Dartmouth College
- Anne R. Kenney (B.A. 1972), Carl A. Kroch University Librarian, Cornell University Library
- Nikolai Khokhlov (Ph.D.), professor of psychology at California State University, San Bernardino, former KGB officer
- Rachel E. Klevit (post-doc), professor of biochemistry at the University of Washington, member of the National Academy of Sciences
- Walter J. Koch (post-doc 1991–1995), director of the Center for Translational Medicine, professor and chairman of the department of pharmacology, and W.W. Smith Chair in Cardiovascular Medicine at Temple University
- M. A. R. Koehl (Ph.D. 1976), professor at the University of California, Berkeley; member of the National Academy of Sciences; awarded a MacArthur Fellowship in 1990
- Juanita M. Kreps (A.M. 1944, Ph.D. 1948), professor, economist, U.S. secretary of commerce
- Josh Kun (B.A. 1993), professor of communication at the University of Southern California and MacArthur Fellow 2016
- Bruce R. Kuniholm (M.A. 1972, M.A.P.P.S. 1976, Ph.D. 1976), professor at the Sanford School of Public Policy; expert on U.S. foreign policy in the Middle East
- Luciano L'Abate (Ph.D. 1956), "father of relational theory"; author of 50 books in the field of American psychology
- Frank Lentricchia (Ph.D. 1960), literary critic; professor of literature at Duke University
- Jerry B. Lincecum (Ph.D.), emeritus professor of English; author; affiliated with Austin College in Sherman, Texas
- Jerome Loving (Ph.D.), professor of American literature and culture at the University of Texas at Austin
- Marc Lynch (A.B.), professor of political science at George Washington University
- Khaled Mattawa (Ph.D. 2009), Libyan poet, awarded a MacArthur Fellowship in 2014
- Raven I. McDavid Jr., linguist, dialectologist
- Lionel W. McKenzie (B.S. 1939), economist
- Steven G. Medema, professor of economics
- Allan Meltzer (A.B. 1948, A.M. 1955), economist who served on the Council of Economic Advisors for Presidents Kennedy and Ronald Reagan
- Duane Mitchell (M.D., Ph.D. 2001), assistant vice president for research, associate dean for translational science and Clinical Research, and director of the University of Florida Clinical and Translational Science Institute
- Jean-Paul C. Montagnier (Ph.D. 1994), musicologist
- Richard L. Morrill (Ph.D. 1968), chancellor of the University of Richmond
- Robert L. Morris (Ph.D. 1969), psychologist, Koestler professor at the University of Edinburgh
- Chip Mosher, education columnist, poet, teacher
- Noel Perrin (A.M., 1950), scholar, essayist, and critic; professor at Dartmouth College
- Joseph Gaither Pratt (A.B. 1931, M.A. 1933, Ph.D. 1936), psychologist
- Reynolds Price (A.B 1955), author and professor of literature at Duke
- Amélie Quesnel-Vallée (Ph.D. 2004), associate professor with joint appointment in the departments of sociology and epidemiology, and Canada Research Chair in Policies and Health Inequalities at McGill University
- William Bee Ravenel III (M.A.), head of the English Department at Episcopal High School (Alexandria, Virginia), mentor to Senator and presidential candidate John S. McCain III
- John A. Rich (M.D. 1984), chair of the department of health management and policy at Drexel University; 2006 MacArthur Fellowship
- Charles C. Richardson (B.S. 1959, M.D. 1960), biochemist, professor at Harvard University
- Haun Saussy (A.B., 1981), university professor of comparative literature at the University of Chicago
- Claudia Scott (M.A., Ph.D. 19971), public policy professor
- Shauna Shapiro, professor of psychology at Santa Clara University
- Baba Shiv (Ph.D. 1996), professor of marketing at Stanford's Graduate School of Business
- Eric Stach (B.S.E. 1992), materials scientist, professor at the University of Pennsylvania, fellow of the American Physical Society
- Glen Stassen (Ph.D.), ethicist; Baptist theologian; son of former Minnesota governor and nine-time presidential candidate Harold Stassen
- Omari Swinton (M.A. 2003, Ph.D 2007), economist, head of the National Economic Association
- Robert Tally (A.B. 1990, J.D. 2001), professor of English at Texas State University
- John E. Thomas (Ph.D. 1959), medical ethicist
- J. Anderson Thomson (A.B. 1970), trustee of the Richard Dawkins Foundation for Reason and Science
- Robert M. Townsend (A.B. 1970), professor of economics at MIT and two-time winner of the Frisch Medal (1998, 2012)
- Jenny Tung (B.S. 2003, Ph.D. 2010), evolutionary anthropologist, received a MacArthur Fellowship in 2019
- Peter Turchin (Ph.D. 1985), Russian-American scientist, specializing in population biology and "cliodynamics"
- Sam Wang (post-doc), neuroscientist, professor and best-selling author
- Daniel T. Willingham (A.B. 1983), professor of psychology at the University of Virginia

=== History ===
- William Baskerville Hamilton
- Kenneth Margerison

=== Medicine, science and technology ===
- David H. Adams, heart valve surgery and mitral valve repair
- Raymond Delacy Adams (M.D. 1936), professor of neurology at Harvard Medical School; chief of neurology at Massachusetts General Hospital; fellow of the American Academy of Arts and Sciences
- Nita Ahuja (M.D. 1993), chair of the department of surgery at Yale University School of Medicine
- Waleed Al-Salam (Ph.D. 1958), mathematician
- Eben Alexander (M.D. 1980), neurosurgeon and best-selling author
- Linda Austin (M.D. 1976), psychiatrist
- Lenox Baker (M.D. 1973), physician, public servant
- Lt. Andy Baldwin, The Bachelor, lieutenant, and doctor
- Ketan Ramanlal Bulsara (M.D. 1996), chief of neurosurgery at the University of Connecticut
- Ian Barbour (M.S. 1946), physicist, theologian, and recipient of the Templeton Prize in 1999
- Charles E. Brady Jr. (M.D. 1975), astronaut
- John C. Browne (Ph.D.), former director of the Los Alamos National Laboratory
- Jerome Bruner (A.B. 1937), psychologist and professor
- David R. Bryant (Ph.D. 1961), organic chemist
- John Buse (Ph.D. 1985, M.D. 1986), former president of the American Diabetes Association
- Jacquelyn Campbell (B.S.N 1968), Anna D. Wolf Chair at the Johns Hopkins School of Nursing, Member of the National Academy of Medicine
- C. Thomas Caskey (M.D. 1963), medical geneticist and biomedical entrepreneur
- Iain Cheeseman (B.S. 1997), assistant professor at MIT
- Lauren M. Childs (dual B.S. 2004), mathematician, expert on modeling disease spread
- George M. Church (B.S. 1974), "father" of most current sequencing and array technologies; helped initiate the Human Genome Project; professor at Harvard Medical School
- Daniel J. Clancy (A.B. 1985), computer scientist, engineering director for Google Book Search
- Daniel Colón-Ramos (Ph.D. 2003), Dorys McConnell Duberg Associate Professor of Neuroscience and Cell Biology at Yale University School of Medicine
- Marcus Conant (B.S. 1957, M.D. 1961), dermatologist and AIDS researcher
- Richard Cytowic (B.A. 1973), neuroscientist and leading authority on the field of synesthesia
- Rose May Davis (Ph.D. 1929), chemist; first woman to be awarded a Ph.D. at Duke
- Ralph de la Torre (BSE), cardiologist, former CEO of bankrupt Steward Health Care, who allegedly mismanaged company funds for personal gain, contributing to Steward's bankruptcy
- William DeVries (GME 1971–1979), pioneer of artificial organs
- Scott Dulchavsky (surgical fellowship), chairman of surgery and surgeon-in-chief at the Henry Ford Hospital
- Sylvia Earle (Ph.D., 1966), marine biologist; chief scientist of the National Oceanic and Atmospheric Administration
- Jim Ellis, co-creator of Usenet with Tom Truscott
- Robert Everett (B.S. 1942), National Medal of Technology and Innovation laureate (1989)
- Paul Farmer (B.S. 1982), infectious disease specialist; winner of MacArthur Award; subject of Pulitzer Prize–winning author Tracy Kidder's biography Mountains Beyond Mountains
- Robert Fischell (B.S. 1951), physicist, inventor, holder of more than 200 U.S. and foreign medical patents, National Medal of Technology and Innovation laureate in 2015
- C. Stephen Foster (B.S. 1965), ophthalmologist, developed the "step ladder approach to care" for treating patients with ocular inflammatory disease
- Joseph F. Fraumeni Jr. (M.D. 1958), cancer researcher; member of the National Academy of Sciences, the Institute of Medicine, the American Academy of Arts and Sciences, and the Association of American Physicians
- Irwin Fridovich (Ph.D. 1955), biochemist, member of the National Academy of Science
- Craig Gentry (B.S. 1995), computer scientist, MacArthur Fellow, recipient of the ACM's Grace Murray Hopper Award
- Ken Gergen (Ph.D. 1962), psychologist and professor at Swarthmore College
- John H. Gibbons (Ph.D. 1954), scientist, nuclear physicist, and internationally recognized expert in technologies for energy efficiency and energy resource conservation
- Myron L. Good (Ph.D. 1951), particle physicist
- Antonella Grassi (Ph.D. 1990), mathematician; fellow of the American Mathematical Society
- Eugene Gu (M.D. 2015), president and CEO of the Ganogen Research Institute
- Scott Guthrie, executive vice president of the Cloud and Enterprise group at Microsoft
- Robert S. Haltiwanger (B.S. 1980, Ph.D. 1986), chairman of the department of biochemistry and cell biology at Stony Brook University
- Mark S. Humayun (M.D. 1989), recipient of the National Medal of Technology and Innovation (2015), member of the National Academy of Medicine and the National Academy of Engineering
- Krithi Karanth (Ph.D.), conservation biologist
- George A. Keyworth II (Ph.D. 1968), physicist; presidential science advisor; former board member of Hewlett-Packard
- Bruce K. Kirchoff (Ph.D. 1981), botanist
- Cassie Kozyrkov (Ph.D. 2012), chief decision scientist, Google
- Martin Kratt (B.S.), zoologist and children's television host
- Anita Layton (B.S. 1994), Robert R. & Katherine B. Penn Professor of Mathematics at Duke University
- Sarah Lisanby (B.S. 1987, M.D. 1991), psychiatrist; director of translational research at The National Institute of Mental Health
- Martin J. Lohse (post-doc), physician and pharmacologist
- Derek Lowe (Ph.D. 1988), medicinal chemist
- John M. MacDougal (Ph.D. 1984), botanist
- Robert Malkin (Ph.D. 1993), biomedical engineer; fellow of the American Institute for Medical and Biological Engineering
- Jennifer Manlove (Ph.D. 1993), sociological research scientist at Child Trends
- Peter V. E. McClintock (post-doc 1968), physicist
- Joe M. McCord (Ph.D. 1970), biochemist; discovered the enzyme superoxide dismutase
- Frank B. McDonald (B.S. 1948), astrophysicist; former chief scientist of NASA; member of the National Academy of Sciences
- Michelle McMurry-Heath (M.D./Ph.D. 2000), doctor, immunologist, policymaker, and current CEO of the Biotechnology Innovation Organization (BIO)
- Delano Meriwether (M.D. 1967), physician, head of the United States Government 1976 swine flu immunization program
- Tony Mills (A.B. 1982, M.D. 1986), physician specializing in the treatment of HIV and AIDS
- Radhe Mohan (Ph.D. 1969), medical physicist and radiation treatment safety pioneer
- Harold A. Mooney (Ph.D. 1960), former president of the Ecological Society of America; member of the National Academy of Sciences
- Robert Morris (Ph.D. 1969), psychologist, Koestler professor at the University of Edinburgh
- Terry Myerson (B.S. 1992), head of Microsoft's operating systems engineering group
- Dana S. Nau (Ph.D. 1979), professor of computer science at the University of Maryland; fellow of the Association for Computing Machinery
- Victoria Chibuogu Nneji (Ph.D. 2019), computer scientist, design and innovation strategist, and a lecturing fellow, known for her research on robotics and autonomous transportation
- Bert W. O'Malley (residency), distinguished professor of molecular and cellular biology at Baylor College of Medicine; recipient of the National Medal of Science
- George B. Pegram (B.A. 1895), conducted pioneering research on the behavior of neutrons and played a key role in the administration of the Manhattan Project
- Louis Pillemer (B.S. 1932), immunologist; discoverer of properdin
- Sheldon Pinnell (A.B.), dermatologist; lead scientist of SkinCeuticals
- Freda Porter (Ph.D. 1991), applied mathematician and environmental scientist known as one of the first Native American women to earn a PhD in the mathematical sciences
- David Tab Rasmussen (Ph.D. 1986), paleontologist
- Thomas Reardon (M.S. 2010), inventor of Internet Explorer
- Walter Rudin (A.B. 1947, Ph.D. 1949), mathematician, recipient of the Leroy P. Steele Prize awarded by the American Mathematical Society
- Michael Ryschkewitsch (Ph.D. 1978), NASA chief engineer
- Alan R. Saltiel (A.B. 1975), director of the Life Sciences Institute at the University of Michigan
- John H. Sampson (Ph.D. 1996, M.B.A. 2011), world-renowned neurosurgeon
- Arun Kumar Shukla (post-doc 2006–2011), professor at the Indian Institute of Technology, awarded the Infosys Prize
- Sir John Skehel (post-doc 1968–1971), British virologist
- Dylan Smith, co-founder and chief financial officer of Box
- Jason Stajich (B.S. 1999, Ph.D. 2006), microbiologist at the University of California, Riverside
- William Kennedy Smith, founder of Physicians Against Land Mines
- Michael Tomasello (B.A. 1972), director of the Max Planck Institute for Evolutionary Anthropology; professor at Duke University; member of the National Academy of Sciences
- Joseph Travis (Ph.D. 1980), biologist; fellow of the American Academy of Arts and Sciences; former president of the American Society of Naturalists
- Tom Truscott, co-creator of Usenet with Jim Ellis
- Luis von Ahn, inventor of CAPTCHA and the Google image labeler; awarded a MacArthur Fellowship in 2006
- Olaf von Ramm (Ph.D. 1973), first patent on a 3-D ultrasound, later developed the first electronically steered matrix-array 3-D ultrasound imager
- Ge Wang, creator of the ChucK programming language
- Lewis W. Wannamaker (M.D. 1946), biochemist; recipient of the Robert Koch Prize; member of the Institute of Medicine of the National Academy of Sciences
- Brittany Wenger (B.S. 2017), winner of the Google Science Fair in 2012
- R. Sanders Williams (M.D. 1974), president of Gladstone Institutes; professor of medicine at UCSF
- Blake S. Wilson (B.S.E.E 1974), co-developer of the cochlear implant; recipient of the 2013 Lasker Award for clinical research
- Melanie Wood (B.S. 2003), mathematician
- Anne D. Yoder (Ph.D. 1992), Braxton Craven Professor of Evolutionary Biology at Duke University

=== Literature ===
- Arthur Talmage Abernethy (A.M. 1891, Trinity College), journalist, theologian, minister, first North Carolina Poet Laureate
- Dorsey Armstrong (Ph.D. 1998), editor-in-chief of Arthuriana
- Douglas Brunt (A.B. 1993), novelist and entrepreneur
- John W. Campbell (B.S. 1932), science fiction writer
- Fred Chappell (A.B. 1961, A.M. 1964), North Carolina Poet Laureate, novelist
- Lucy Corin (A.B. 1992), novelist and short story writer; awarded Rome Prize by the American Academy of Arts and Letters
- Guy Davenport (B.A. 1948), author, Thasos and Ohio, National Review contributor
- G. William Domhoff (A.B. 1958), author of the controversial bestseller Who Rules America?
- David Drake (J.D. 1972), author of science fiction and fantasy literature
- Lee McGeorge Durrell (Ph.D. 1979), author, television presenter, zookeeper
- Ainehi Edoro (Ph.D. 2016), founder and editor of Brittle Paper
- Elizabeth A. Fenn (A.B. 1981), American historian, recipient of the 2015 Pulitzer Prize for History
- Ben Fountain (J.D. 1983), author of fiction
- Paul Goldberg (A.B. 1981), novelist, The Yid, and editor and publisher of The Cancer Letter
- David Guy, novelist and professor
- Josephine Humphreys (A.B. 1967), novelist
- Mac Hyman (A.B. 1947), author of No Time for Sergeants
- Russell Kirk (A.M. 1941), author of The Conservative Mind
- Nathaniel Lande (B.A. 1956), author, filmmaker, former creative director of Time magazine
- Peter Maas (A.B. 1949), author of novels The Valachi Papers and Serpico, later made into movies
- Dan Mallory (A.B. 2001), best-selling author of The Woman in the Window
- Tucker Max (J.D. 2001), author of I Hope They Serve Beer in Hell
- Lydia Millet (M.E.M. 1996), author of novels Oh Pure and Radiant Heart, Everyone's Pretty
- Peggy Payne (1970), author, Sister India
- Noel Perrin (A.M., 1950), scholar, essayist, critic, professor at Dartmouth College
- Michael Peterson (A.B. 1965), author, politician, convicted of murdering his wife in 2003
- Reynolds Price (A.B 1955), author; James B. Duke professor of literature at Duke
- Lynn Veach Sadler, poet, author, and playwright
- Haun Saussy (A.B., 1981), university professor of comparative literature at the University of Chicago; formerly at Stanford University, where he chaired the comparative literature department, and Yale University
- William Seale (Ph.D. 1965), American historian and author
- Frank G. Slaughter (B.A. 1926), novelist and physician
- Margaret Taylor Smith (A.B. 1947), author, social activist, chair of Kresge Foundation
- William C. Styron (A.B. 1947), author, Pulitzer Prize winner, wrote The Confessions of Nat Turner and Sophie's Choice
- Anne Tyler (A.B. 1961), Pulitzer Prize-winning novelist and writer of short stories
- Haim Watzman (B.A. 1978), writer
- Jonathan Wilson-Hartgrove (MDiv), writer
- Richard Zimler (A.B. 1977), novelist, author of The Last Kabbalist of Lisbon,The Warsaw Anagrams and The Gospel According to Lazarus

=== Fine arts ===
- Michael Best (A.B. 1962), former principal artist of the Metropolitan Opera
- Les Brown (A.B. 1936), musician, Les Brown & the Band of Renown; Jazz Hall of Fame inductee, 1999
- Michael Ching (A.B. 1980), composer
- Bill Cunliffe (A.B. 1978), Grammy Award-winning composer, arranger, pianist
- SarahAnne Perel (B.A. 2020), ballerina
- William Stone (B.A., 1966), operatic baritone
- Oleg Timofeyev (Ph.D. 1999), musicologist

=== Religion ===
- Jamal Harrison Bryant (MDiv), senior pastor of New Birth Missionary Baptist Church
- Kathy Rudy (MDiv, PhD), women's studies scholar and theologian

=== Entertainment ===
- Andy Baldwin (B.S. 1999), The Bachelor, lieutenant, and doctor
- Richard Brake, Welsh and American actor
- Jayne Brook (1982), actress, Chicago Hope
- Ryan Carnes (X. 2004), actor, Desperate Housewives, Eating Out
- Bailey Chase (B.A. 1995), actor, Longmire
- Jack Coleman (A.B. 1980), actor, Heroes, Dynasty, Days of Our Lives
- Robert L. Cook (B.S. 1973), Academy Award-winning software-programmer whose computer-graphics program, RenderMan, is used in many contemporary films
- Kara DioGuardi (A.B. 1993), songwriter for musicians including Carlos Santana, Kelly Clarkson and Britney Spears, American Idol judge
- Paul W. Downs (B.A. 2004), actor, Broad City, and co-creator of Hacks
- Lee McGeorge Durrell (Ph.D. 1979), author, television presenter, zookeeper
- René Echevarria (A.B. 1984), producer, The 4400, Dark Angel, Now and Again; screenwriter, Star Trek: The Next Generation, Star Trek: Deep Space Nine
- Sean Flynn (X. 1963), actor and Vietnam War photojournalist
- Annabeth Gish (A.B. 1992), actress, X-Files, The West Wing
- Kevin Gray (A.B. 1980), Broadway actor, Phantom on Broadway after Michael Crawford
- Emmett Grogan (attended), founder of the Diggers theatre
- John Gromada (A.B. 1986), Broadway composer and sound designer
- Jared Harris (B.F.A. 1984), Emmy-nominated actor, Mad Men, The Curious Case of Benjamin Button
- David Hudgins, television writer, Friday Night Lights
- Ken Jeong (B.S. 1990), comedian, physician, actor, Community, Knocked Up, Role Models, The Hangover films
- Belle Knox (B.A. 2016), pornographic actress
- Cody Ko (A.B. 2012), YouTube personality and Computer scientist
- Martin Kratt (B.S. 1989), creator and star of PBS's Zoboomafoo
- Rossana Lacayo (B.S. 1979), Nicaraguan photographer and pioneer filmmaker
- Alisa Lepselter (A.B. 1985), editor of director Woody Allen's films since 1999
- Keith Lucas (attended law school), Academy Award-nominated writer and producer of Judas and the Black Messiah
- Bascom Lamar Lunsford (J.D. 1913), folk musician
- MatPat (B.S. 2009), YouTuber
- Tucker Max (J.D. 2001), author of the New York Times bestselling book I Hope They Serve Beer in Hell; internet celebrity (TuckerMax.com)
- Emma D. Miller (B.A. 2012), documentary filmmaker
- Ben Mulroney (A.B. 1997), host of Canadian Idol and eTalk Daily; son of former Canadian Prime Minister Brian Mulroney
- Alexi Murdoch, singer-songwriter
- Mike Posner (A.B. 2010), singer, songwriter, "Cooler Than Me", "Please Don't Go"
- Charles Randolph-Wright, director, writer, and producer
- Retta (B.S. 1992), stand-up comedian and actress, Parks and Recreation
- Monty Sarhan (J.D. 1999), CEO of SkyShowtime
- Teddy Schwarzman (J.D. 2006), Academy Award-nominated film producer, The Imitation Game; former corporate lawyer at Skadden, Arps, Slate, Meagher & Flom
- Rebecca Sealfon (Ph.D. 2009), internet celebrity and winner of 1997 Scripps National Spelling Bee
- David H. Steinberg (J.D. 1993), screenwriter and film director; wrote screenplays for American Pie 2, Slackers, National Lampoon's Barely Legal, and American Pie Presents: The Book of Love
- Travis Lane Stork (B.S. 1994), reality star of ABC's Bachelor 8 and host of the Daytime Emmy Award-winning talk show, The Doctors
- Mike Stud (A.B. 2010), singer, songwriter, A Toast to Tommy (2011), Relief (2013), Closer (2014), These Days (2016)
- Danya Taymor (A.B. 2010), Tony Award-winning theatre director
- Rita Volk (B.S. 2009), actress and model, known for her role as Amy Raudenfeld in the MTV hit romantic comedy series Faking It
- Randall Wallace (A.B. 1971), Academy Award-nominated screenwriter of Braveheart; also wrote screenplay for Pearl Harbor and wrote and directed The Man in the Iron Mask and We Were Soldiers
- Patrick Williams (A.B. 1961), Academy Award-nominated composer for movies and TV; Emmy and Grammy winner
- Robert Yeoman (A.B. 1973), Academy Award-nominated cinematographer, Bottle Rocket, Rushmore, The Royal Tenenbaums, The Life Aquatic With Steve Zissou, The Darjeeling Limited, and The Grand Budapest Hotel

=== Journalism and media ===
- Blayne Alexander (B.A.), television journalist for NBC News
- Dan Abrams (A.B. 1988), chief legal correspondent for ABC News, host of Verdict with Dan Abrams, former general manager of MSNBC
- Diana Butler Bass (Ph.D. 1991), columnist and author
- J. Bowyer Bell (doctorate 1959), historian, artist and art critic
- Dan Bernstein (A.B.), sports journalist, WSCR radio host
- John Carreyrou (A.B. 1994), Pulitzer Prize–winning journalist
- Jessica Faye Carter (J.D. 2002, M.B.A. 2002), author, columnist, social media entrepreneur
- Michelle Charlesworth (A.B. 1992), WABC-TV anchor and reporter
- Seth Davis (A.B. 1992), Sports Illustrated columnist and college basketball analyst for CBS Sports
- Laila el-Haddad (A.B. 2000), Palestinian journalist
- Alex Epstein (A.B.), writer, founder and president of the Center for Industrial Progress
- John Feinstein (A.B. 1977), sports journalist
- Clay Felker (A.B. 1951), founding editor of New York Magazine
- Edward L. Fike (class of 1941), journalist and publisher in California, Montana, North Carolina, Ohio, and Virginia
- Sean Flynn (X. 1963), actor and Vietnam War photojournalist
- Mike Grella (B.A. 2009), sports analyst of soccer for CBS Sports
- Cornelia Grumman (B.S. 1985), Pulitzer Prize–winning journalist
- Kerry Hannon (A.B. 1982), best-selling author
- Melissa Harris-Perry (M.A., Ph.D. 1999), author, television host and political commentator
- David Hartman (A.B. 1956), first host of Good Morning America on ABC
- John Harwood (A.B. 1978), National Political Editor of The Wall Street Journal, frequent panelist on Washington Week
- Mangesh Hattikudur (A.B. 2001), co-founder of mental floss with Will Pearson
- Nia-Malika Henderson (B.A.), journalist, senior political reporter for CNN
- Ben Jacobs (J.D.), political reporter for The Guardian
- Louis Isaac Jaffe, Pulitzer Prize-winning journalist
- Hugo Lindgren (A.B. 1990), editor of The New York Times Magazine
- Mark Mazzetti (A.B. 1996), The New York Times national security correspondent and 2009 Pulitzer Prize winner
- Scott McCartney (A.B. 1982), travel editor and journalist for The Wall Street Journal, author
- Sean McManus (A.B. 1977), president of CBS News and CBS Sports
- Susannah Meadows (A.B. 1995), senior writer for Newsweek
- Richard A. Oppel Jr. (A.B. 1990), journalist, reported for The New York Times from Iraq, Israel and Washington, D.C.
- Will Pearson (A.B. 2001), co-founder of mental floss with Mangesh Hattikudur
- Nabeel Qureshi (M.A.), Christian apologetic, author and speaker
- JJ Ramberg (A.B. 1992), host of MSNBC's weekend business program Your Business
- Windland Smith Rice (X. 1992), photographer, daughter of Frederick W. Smith, billionaire founder of FedEx
- Charlie Rose (A.B. 1964, J.D. 1968), journalist, former CBS News anchor, 60 Minutes contributor
- Jim Rosenfield (A.B. 1981), WCBS-TV anchor
- Michael Ruhlman (A.B. 1985), nonfiction author
- Scott Savitt (A.B. 1985), author of Crashing the Party, recognized expert on China
- A. M. Secrest (A.B. 1944, M.A. 1970, Ph.D. 1972), journalist and Nieman Fellow
- John Seigenthaler Jr. (B.S. 1978), Al Jazeera America news anchor, formerly at NBC News and MSNBC
- Elizabeth Spiers (A.B. 1999), founding editor of Gawker.com
- Barry Svrluga (A.B. 1993), national baseball writer for The Washington Post
- Susan Tifft (A.B. 1973), writer and editor for Time magazine; professor at Sanford School of Public Policy
- Kelly Tilghman (A.B. 1991), broadcaster for The Golf Channel; the PGA Tour's first female lead golf announcer
- Jim Toomey (B.S.E. 1983), syndicated cartoonist of Sherman's Lagoon
- Craig Whitlock (A.B. 1990), writer for The Washington Post and author of The Afghanistan Papers: A Secret History of the War
- Judy Woodruff (A.B. 1968), NBC's White House correspondent and Washington correspondent for the MacNeil/Lehrer News Hour, anchor at CNN

=== Philanthropy ===
- Sally Dalton Robinson, philanthropist and board member of the Charlotte Symphony Orchestra, Charlotte Mecklenburg Library, and the McColl Center for Art + Innovation

=== Athletics ===
See also men's basketball players, women's basketball players, and football players.

==== American football ====
- Jack Alexander, former football player and coach
- Lou Allen, former professional football player
- Jackson Anderson, former NFL player
- Troy Andrew, former NFL player
- Kenny Anunike, former NFL player, current defense line coach for Fordham Rams
- Bill Bailey (B.A. 1939), former NFL player
- Patrick Bailey, NFL linebacker, Pittsburgh Steelers
- Brian Baldinger (B.A. 1982), former National Football League offensive lineman; commentator for Fox
- Graham Barton, NFL player for the Tampa Bay Buccaneers
- Tony Benjamin, former NFL player
- Ben Bennett (B.A. 1983), former NFL player
- Josh Blackwell (B.A. 2020), NFL player for Chicago Bears
- Al Blades Jr., NFL player, current free agent
- Issac Blakeney, former NFL player
- Lamar Blount, former NFL player
- Jake Bobo, NFL player for Seattle Seahawks
- Anthony Boone, former professional football player
- Breon Borders (B.A. 2016), former NFL player
- Charles Bowser (B.A. 1982), NFL linebacker, 4th round draft pick
- Re'quan Boyette (B.A. 2009), former football player
- Dave Brown (B.A. 1991), ten seasons in the NFL with the New York Giants and Arizona Cardinals
- Kidd Brewer, former college football player
- Chase Brice (grad), professional football player
- Bob Brodhead, former NFL player
- Brittain Brown, NFL player, current free agent
- Billy Bryan, former NFL player
- Jalon Calhoun, CFL player for the Edmonton Elks
- Joe Cardwell, former NFL player
- Wray Carlton (B.A. 1965), American Football League all star, Buffalo Bills fullback and all-time leading rusher from the AFL years
- DeWayne Carter (B.A. 2023), NFL player for Buffalo Bills
- Michael Carter II (B.A. 2020), NFL player for New York Jets
- Jeremy Cash (B.A. 2016), NFL linebacker, All-American defensive back
- Chris Castor (B.A. 1982), former NFL player
- Wes Chesson, former NFL player
- Ross Cockrell (B.A. 2014), NFL cornerback, New York Giants
- Takoby Cofield (B.A. 2014), former professional football player
- Chris Combs, former NFL player
- Bill Cox, former NFL player
- Fred Crawford, former NFL player
- Jamison Crowder (B.A. 2014), NFL wide receiver, Washington Redskins
- Mike Curtis, NFL All Pro linebacker with the Baltimore Colts; Super Bowl V champion
- Randy Cuthbert, former NFL player
- Matt Daniels, former NFL player
- Evan Deckers, NFL player for Tampa Bay Buccaneers
- Al DeRogatis (B.A. 1948), Pro Bowl tackle for the New York Giants; later lead analyst for the NFL on NBC
- Anthony Dilweg (B.A. 1989), former NFL quarterback, enjoyed brief success with the Green Bay Packers
- Victor Dimukeje (B.A. 2020), NFL player for Arizona Cardinals
- Dave Dunaway, NFL wide receiver
- Jim Duncan, former NFL player
- Mataeo Durant, professional football player
- Blaine Earon, former NFL player
- George Edwards, NFL assistant coach
- Jeff Faris (B.A. 2011), head coach at Austin Peay State University
- Ray Farmer, scouting consultant for Los Angeles Rams
- John Farquhar, former NFL player
- Ryan Fowler, NFL linebacker, New York Jets
- Lennie Friedman, NFL offensive lineman, 2nd round draft pick
- Mark Gilbert, professional football player
- Joe Giles-Harris, NFL player for Jacksonville Jaguars
- Keith Gill, commissioner of the Sun Belt Conference
- Scotty Glacken, former NFL player
- Billy Granville, former NFL player
- Noah Gray, NFL player for Kansas City Chiefs
- Bob Grupp, former NFL player
- Buzz Guy, former NFL player
- Thomas Hennessy, NFL long snapper
- Cedric Jones (B.A. 1982), NFL wide receiver
- Daniel Jones (B.A. 2018), No.6 overall pick in 2019 NFL draft, NFL quarterback for Indianapolis Colts
- Steve Jones, former NFL player
- Mike Junkin (B.A. 1986), former NFL player
- Sonny Jurgensen (B.A. 1957), Hall of Fame quarterback who played for the Philadelphia Eagles and Washington Redskins
- Riley Leonard (attended three years; transferred to University of Notre Dame)
- Kevin Lewis, NFL linebacker
- Thaddeus Lewis (B.A. 2012), NFL quarterback
- Patrick Mannelly, NFL long snapper
- George McAfee, Hall of Fame halfback who played for the Chicago Bears
- Max McCaffrey (B.A. 2016), NFL wide receiver, San Francisco 49ers
- Mike McGee, former NFL player
- Ed Meadows, former NFL player
- Scottie Montgomery, Arena Football League wide receiver/defensive back
- Ed Newman (1973), NFL offensive guard; 12 seasons with the Miami Dolphins; Super Bowl VIII champion
- Ayanga Okpokowuruk, football player
- Clarence "Ace" Parker, Hall of Fame quarterback who played for the Brooklyn Dodgers, Boston Yanks, and New York Yankees
- Lucas Patrick (B.A. 2016), American football, guard, Green Bay Packers
- Tommy Prothro, former head coach of the Los Angeles Rams and San Diego Chargers
- Tawambi Settles, player of gridiron football
- Drew Strojny (B.A. 2004), NFL football offensive tackle
- Michael Tauiliili (B.A. 2008), former NFL player
- Lou Tepe, former NFL player
- Corey Thomas, former NFL player
- Juwan Thompson (B.A. 2014), former NFL player
- Orrin Thompson, former NFL player
- Emmett Tilley (B.A. 1982), former NFL player
- Laken Tomlinson, NFL offensive guard, San Francisco 49ers; 1st round draft pick
- Tom Topping, former college football player
- J. T. Turner, former NFL player
- Conner Vernon (B.A. 2013), former NFL player
- Chuck Walker, former NFL player
- Jordan Waters (transferred to North Carolina State), NFL player
- Benjamin Watson (attended one year; transferred to University of Georgia), former NFL player
- Jay Wilkinson, former football player
- Garland Williams, former professional player
- Shaun Wilson, NFL player
- Al Woodall, former NFL player

==== Baseball ====
- Wayne Ambler, Major League Baseball (MLB) player
- Arthur Bradsher
- Bob Brower, former MLB player
- Greg Burke, former MLB player
- Chris Capuano (B.A. 2000), former MLB player
- Wilbur Wade Card
- Griffin Conine, MLB player
- Bobby Coombs
- Claude Corbitt, former MLB player
- Brandy Davis, former MLB player
- Lawrence "Crash" Davis, former MLB player (see also Bull Durham)
- Ron Davis
- Andrew Fischer, MLB player
- Mort Flohr, Former MLB player
- Nate Freiman (B.A. 2009), former MLB player
- James Gallagher, former professional baseball player
- Lee Griffeth, Former MLB player
- Alex Hassan, former MLB player
- Jimmy Herron, MLB player
- Ryan Jackson, former MLB player
- Bryce Jarvis, MLB player for Arizona Diamondbacks
- Austin Knickerbocker, former MLB player
- Kenny Koplove, former professional baseball player; played internationally for Israel
- Jake Lemmerman, former professional baseball player
- Joey Loperfido, MLB player for Houston Astros
- Ned Martin, former play-by-play announcer for the Boston Red Sox
- Bill McCahan, former MLB player
- Quinton McCracken, former MLB player
- Matt Mervis, MLB player for Chicago Cubs
- Dan Otero, former MLB pitcher
- Scott Schoeneweis, former MLB pitcher, member of the 2002 World Series Champion Anaheim Angels
- Al Spangler, former MLB player
- Graeme Stinson, professional baseball player
- Marcus Stroman (B.A. 2016), MLB pitcher, Chicago Cubs
- Eric Tipton, former MLB player
- Mike Trombley, former MLB pitcher
- Hal Wagner, former MLB player

==== Basketball ====
- Alaa Abdelnaby (B.A. 1990), former professional basketball player, college basketball analyst
- Onome Akinbode-James (B.A. 2022), former professional basketball player
- Mark Alarie (B.A. 1986), former professional basketball player
- Grayson Allen (B.A. 2018), No. 21 pick of the 2018 NBA draft, professional basketball player, Phoenix Suns
- Tommy Amaker (B.A. 1987), Harvard Crimson men's basketball head basketball coach
- Tate Armstrong (B.A. 1977), former professional basketball player
- William Avery (B.A. 2023), former professional basketball player
- Marvin Bagley III, professional basketball player, No. 2 pick of the 2018 NBA draft, NBA player for Washington Wizards
- Joey Baker (B.A. 2022), professional basketball player
- Mistie Bass (B.A. 2006), former professional basketball player
- Chante Black (B.A. 2009), former professional basketball player
- Joanne Boyle (B.A. 1985), former head coach of Virginia Cavaliers women's basketball
- Alison Bales (B.A. 2007), former professional player (WNBA)
- Elizabeth Balogun (B.A. 2023), professional basketball player
- Paolo Banchero, NBA player for Orlando Magic
- Gene Banks (B.A. 1981), former professional basketball player
- Tony Barone (B.A. 1971), former basketball coach and scout
- RJ Barrett, No.3 overall pick in the 2019 NBA draft, NBA player for Toronto Raptors
- Shane Battier (B.A. 2001), former professional basketball player
- Alana Beard (B.A. 2004), former professional basketball player in the WNBA
- Joe Belmont, former professional basketball player and coach
- Bob Bender (B.A. 1980), former professional basketball coach
- Jay Bilas (A.B. 1986, J.D. 1992), ESPN sports commentator
- Kenny Blakeney (B.A. 1995), former professional basketball player
- Marques Bolden, professional basketball player
- Cameron Boozer, NBA player for Memphis Grizzlies
- Carlos Boozer (B.A. 2020), former professional basketball player
- Elton Brand, former professional basketball player
- Robert Brickey (B.A. 1990), former assistant coach for SMU and North Carolina Central
- Maliq Brown (B.A. 2026), NBA player for San Antonio Spurs
- Lexie Brown (B.A. 2018), WNBA player for the Los Angeles Sparks
- Joy Cheek (B.A. 2010), former professional basketball player
- Karima Christmas-Kelly (B.A. 2011), former professional basketball player
- Monique Currie (B.A. 2006), former professional basketball player
- Jeff Capel (B.A. 1997), men's basketball assistant coach, former head coach at the University of Oklahoma
- Vernon Carey Jr., NBA player for Charlotte Hornets
- Chris Carrawell (B.A. 2000), former professional basketball player, current assistant coach for Duke Blue Devils men's basketball
- Wendell Carter Jr., No. 7 pick of the 2018 NBA draft, NBA player for Orlando Magic
- C. B. Claiborne (B.A. 1969), former basketball player, first African-American to play for Duke Blue Devils men's basketball team
- Henry Cole (B.A. 1921), former basketball player and coach
- Chris Collins (B.A. 1996), men's basketball associate head coach
- Quinn Cook (B.A. 2015), professional basketball player
- Mark Crow (B.A. 1977), former professional basketball player
- Seth Curry (B.A. 2013), NBA player for Charlotte Hornets
- Brian Davis (B.A. 1992), former professional basketball player
- Andre Dawkins (B.A. 2014), former professional basketball player
- Johnny Dawkins (B.A. 1986), University of Central Florida head basketball coach, former Duke associate head basketball coach, former professional basketball player (jersey retired)
- Javin DeLaurier (B.A. 2020), professional basketball player in the Israeli Basketball Premier League
- Rudy D'Emilio (B.A. 1954), former professional basketball player
- Luol Deng, former professional basketball player
- Kenny Dennard (B.A. 1981), former professional basketball player
- Randy Denton (B.A. 1971), former professional basketball player
- Sean Dockery (B.A. 2006), former professional basketball player
- Taymon Domzalski (B.A. 1999), former basketball player for Duke Blue Devils men's basketball team
- Charles "Lefty" Driesell, former college basketball coach (Davidson, Maryland, James Madison, Georgia State)
- Chris Duhon (B.A. 2004), former professional basketball player; assistant coach for Marshall University
- Mike Dunleavy Jr., former professional basketball player
- Trevon Duval, professional basketball player
- Chip Engelland (B.A. 1983), former professional basketball player
- Isaiah Evans, NBA player for Minnesota Timberwolves
- Daniel Ewing (B.A. 2005), professional basketball player, Maccabi Ashdod of the Israeli Premier League
- Danny Ferry (B.A. 1989), former Cleveland Cavaliers general manager, former professional basketball player, member of 2003 NBA Champion San Antonio Spurs (jersey retired)
- Kyle Filipowski, NBA player for Utah Jazz
- Cooper Flagg, NBA player for the Dallas Mavericks
- Bob Gantt (B.A. 1944), former professional basketball player
- Michael Gbinije (attended two years; transferred to Syracuse University), professional basketball player
- Harry Giles III, professional basketball player, 20th pick of 2017 NBA draft
- Mason Gillis (grad), professional basketball player
- Mike Gminski (B.A. 1980), ACC/Raycom sports commentator (jersey retired)
- Jordan Goldwire (B.A. 2021), professional basketball player
- Miela Goodchild (B.A. 2022), professional basketball player for Perth Lynx
- Haley Gorecki (B.A. 2019), professional basketball player (WNBA)
- Jacob Grandison (grad), professional basketball player
- Chelsea Gray (B.A. 2014), professional basketball player
- Rebecca Greenwell (B.A. 2018), professional basketball player
- AJ Griffin, former professional basketball player
- Dick Groat, former professional baseball and basketball player (jersey retired)
- Lindsey Harding (B.A. 2007), former professional basketball player, Los Angeles Sparks in the WNBA (jersey retired)
- Dave Henderson (B.A. 1986), 1991 Israeli Basketball Premier League MVP
- Gerald Henderson Jr., former professional basketball player
- Phil Henderson (B.A. 1990), former professional basketball player
- Art Heyman (B.A. 1963), former professional basketball player (jersey retired)
- Grant Hill (B.A. 1994), former professional basketball player, member of Naismith Memorial Basketball Hall of Fame (jersey retired)
- Thomas Hill (B.A. 1993), former professional basketball player
- Rodney Hood (B.A 2026), NBA player for the Los Angeles Clippers
- Nick Horvath (B.A. 2004), former West Sydney Razorbacks professional basketball player
- Bobby Hurley (B.A. 1993), former professional basketball player (jersey retired), head coach at Arizona State
- Matthew Hurt, professional basketball player
- Brandon Ingram, NBA player for Toronto Raptors, No. 2 pick in the 2016 NBA draft
- Kyrie Irving, professional basketball player, Dallas Mavericks; No. 1 pick in the 2011 NBA draft; 2011–2012 NBA Rookie of the Year, 2016 NBA Champion
- Ashlon Jackson (B.A. 2026), professional basketball player
- Frank Jackson, professional basketball player
- Nate James (B.A. 2001), former professional basketball player
- Sion James (grad), professional basketball player
- Amile Jefferson (B.A. 2016), former professional basketball player
- Chase Jeter (attended two years; transferred to University of Arizona), professional basketball player
- Jalen Johnson, NBA player for the Atlanta Hawks
- Dahntay Jones (B.A. 2003), former professional basketball player
- Matt Jones (B.A. 2017), former professional basketball player
- Tre Jones, NBA player for San Antonio Spurs
- Tyus Jones, NBA player for Washington Wizards
- Trevor Keels, NBA player for New York Knicks
- Ryan Kelly (B.A. 2013), professional basketball player, Sun Rockers Shibuya of the B.League
- Luke Kennard, NBA player for the Los Angeles Lakers
- Joe Kennedy, former professional basketball player
- Billy King (B.A. 1988), former president and general manager of the Brooklyn Nets
- Doug Kistler, former professional basketball player
- Kon Knueppel, NBA player for Charlotte Hornets
- Ed Koffenberger, played both basketball and tennis at Duke, Duke's first two-sport athlete
- Greg Koubek (B.A. 1991), former professional basketball player
- Christian Laettner (B.A. 1992), former professional basketball player (jersey retired)
- Antonio Lang (B.A. 1994), former professional basketball player
- Trajan Langdon (B.A. 1999), former professional basketball player
- Tricia Liston (B.A. 2014), professional basketball player
- Dereck Lively II, NBA player for Dallas Mavericks
- Corey Maggette, former professional basketball player
- Taina Mair (B.A. 2026), professional basketball player
- Khaman Maluach, NBA player for Phoenix Suns
- Jared McCain, NBA player for Philadelphia 76ers
- David McClure (B.A. 2009), former professional basketball player
- Josh McRoberts, former professional basketball player
- Danny Meagher (B.A. 1985), former professional basketball player
- Gary Melchionni (B.A. 1973), former professional basketball player
- Lee Melchionni (B.A. 2006), former professional basketball player
- Wendell Moore Jr., NBA player for Detroit Pistons
- Jeff Mullins (B.A. 1964), former professional basketball player for the Golden State Warriors and head basketball coach at UNC Charlotte (jersey retired)
- DeMarcus Nelson (B.A. 2008), professional basketball player, Panathinaikos in Greece
- Martin Nessley (B.A. 1987), former professional basketball player
- Greg Newton (B.A. 1997), former professional basketball player
- Alex O'Connell (attended three years; transferred to Creighton University), professional basketball player
- Leaonna Odom (B.A. 2020), professional basketball player
- Jahlil Okafor, No.3 pick of the 2015 NBA draft, professional basketball player
- Jabari Parker, professional basketball player, No. 2 of the 2014 NBA draft
- Cherokee Parks (B.A. 1994), former professional basketball player
- Greg Paulus (B.A. 2009), former basketball player and current head coach
- Haley Peters (B.A. 2014), professional basketball player
- Marshall Plumlee (B.A. 2016), former basketball player
- Mason Plumlee (B.A. 2013), professional basketball player, Los Angeles Clippers in the NBA
- Miles Plumlee (B.A. 2012), former professional basketball player
- Martynas Pocius (B.A. 2009), professional basketball player
- Tyrese Proctor, professional basketball player
- Shavlik Randolph, former professional basketball player
- Cam Reddish, No.8 pick in the 2019 NBA draft, professional basketball player
- JJ Redick (A.B. 2006), NCAA's all-time leader in three-point field goals, former professional basketball player (jersey retired)
- Bob Riedy (B.A. 1967), former professional basketball player
- Austin Rivers, former professional basketball player
- Jeremy Roach (B.A. 2024), professional basketball player
- Justin Robinson (B.A. 2020), professional basketball player
- Sofía Roma (B.A. 2018), professional basketball player
- Ángela Salvadores, professional basketball player
- Casey Sanders (B.A. 2003), former professional basketball player
- Georgia Schweitzer (B.A. 2001), former professional basketball player
- Wanisha Smith (B.A. 2008), former professional basketball player
- Jon Scheyer (B.A. 2010), American-Israeli McDonald's All American, All-American basketball player for national champion 2009–10 Duke basketball team
- Kyle Singler (B.A. 2011), former professional basketball player
- Nolan Smith (B.A. 2011), 2010 national champion, current Duke men's basketball assistant coach
- Quin Snyder (B.A. 1989, J.D., M.B.A. 1995), former University of Missouri head coach; former Austin Toros of the NBDL head coach; head coach of the Atlanta Hawks in the NBA
- Jim Spanarkel (B.A. 1979), former professional basketball player, NBA and college basketball commentator
- Cassius Stanley, NBA player for Indiana Pacers
- DJ Steward, professional basketball player
- Jayson Tatum, NBA player for the Boston Celtics 2017–present, 3rd overall pick in the 2017 NBA draft, former college basketball player for Duke Blue Devils 2016–2017
- Vince Taylor (B.A. 1982), former professional basketball player
- Jasmine Thomas (B.A. 2011), former professional basketball player
- Krystal Thomas (B.A. 2011), former professional basketball player
- Lance Thomas (B.A. 2010), 2010 national champion (captain); 10th on Duke's all-time list of offensive rebounds; professional basketball player
- Iciss Tillis (B.A. 2004), former professional basketball player
- Tyler Thornton (B.A. 2014), former professional basketball player
- Gary Trent Jr., NBA player for the Milwaukee Bucks
- Jordan Tucker (attended 2017 fall semester; transferred to Butler University), professional basketball player
- Steve Vacendak (B.A. 1966), former professional basketball player
- Bob Verga (B.A. 1967), former professional basketball player
- Michele Van Gorp (B.A. 1999), former professional basketball player (WNBA)
- Abby Waner (B.A. 2009), former professional basketball player (WNBA)
- Jack White (B.A. 2020), professional basketball player
- Dariq Whitehead, NBA player for Brooklyn Nets
- Elizabeth Williams (B.A. 2015), professional basketball player (WNBA)
- Jay Williams (B.A. 2002), former professional basketball player (jersey retired), college basketball commentator and analyst for ESPN
- Mark Williams, NBA player for Phoenix Suns
- Shelden Williams (B.A. 2006), Duke's all-time leader in rebounds and blocked shots, former professional basketball player (jersey retired)
- Zion Williamson, No. 1 pick in the 2019 NBA draft, NBA player for the New Orleans Pelicans
- Justise Winslow, professional basketball player
- Steve Wojciechowski (B.A. 1998), former Marquette men's basketball head coach
- Brian Zoubek (B.A. 2010), former professional basketball player

==== Golf ====
- Skip Alexander, professional golfer
- Beth Bauer, professional golfer
- Laetitia Beck, Israeli professional golfer
- Amanda Blumenherst, professional golfer
- Céline Boutier, professional golfer
- Jenny Chuasiriporn, professional golfer
- Max Greyserman (born 1995), professional golfer on the PGA Tour
- Liz Janangelo, professional golfer
- Brittany Lang, professional golfer
- Leona Maguire (Irish), number 1 Women's World Amateur, Duke senior
- Lisa Maguire, Irish amateur golfer
- Bill Mallon, orthopedic surgeon, professional golfer, leading authority on the history of the Olympic Games
- Joe Ogilvie, professional golfer
- Leif Olson, professional golfer
- Mike Souchak, professional golfer, winner of 15 PGA events
- Kevin Streelman, professional golfer
- Art Wall Jr., professional golfer, winner of 1959 Masters

==== Other ====
- Nicolás Álvarez, professional tennis player
- Stephen Amritraj (B.A. 2006), professional tennis player
- Natasha Anasi, former professional soccer player
- Hannah Bebar (grad), professional soccer player
- Chloe Beck (B.A. 2023), professional tennis player
- Tess Boade (B.A. 2021), professional soccer player
- Samantha Bohon (B.A. 1998), former professional soccer player
- Kelly Cagle (B.A. 1995), former professional soccer player
- Drew Cannon (B.S. 2012), statistician and sports writer; on Boston Celtics staff
- Beatrice Capra (B.A. 2016), professional tennis player
- Ansley Cargill, former professional tennis player
- Mallory Cecil, former professional tennis player
- Jordan Cila, Major League Soccer midfielder
- Michelle Cooper, professional soccer player
- Caitlin Cosme (B.A. 2021), professional soccer player
- Matt Danowski, professional lacrosse player for New Jersey Pride
- Sean Davis, soccer captain of the New York Red Bulls
- Schuyler DeBree (B.A. 2017), former professional soccer player
- Kim DeCesare (B.A. 2013), former soccer player
- Imani Dorsey (B.A. 2017), former professional soccer player
- Georgia Drummy (B.A. 2023), professional tennis player
- Andy Frankenberger, professional poker player, former equity derivatives trader
- Leah Freeman (B.A. 2024), professional soccer player
- Christina Gibbons (B.A. 2016), professional soccer player
- Ester Goldfeld (B.A. 2015), professional tennis player
- Danielle Goldstein, American-Israeli show jumper
- Maggie Graham (B.A. 2023), professional soccer player
- Mia Gyau (B.A. 2019), professional soccer player
- Paulie Harraka, NASCAR racer
- Ella Hase, professional soccer player
- Jay Heaps, head coach of the New England Revolution as of November 2011; former player for the New England Revolution MLS team; former Duke basketball and soccer player
- Þóra Björg Helgadóttir (B.A. 2003), former professional soccer player
- Sarah Hirshland (B.S. 1997), chief executive officer of the United States Olympic Committee
- Nancy Hogshead, Olympic gold medal winner in swimming
- Hiroshi Hoketsu (A.M. 1968), Japanese equestrian rider who debuted in the 1964 Summer Olympics and continues to compete today in the 2012 Summer Olympics
- Marianne Jodoin (B.A. 2014), former professional tennis player
- Garrett Johns (B.A. 2024), professional tennis player
- Abigail Johnston, winner of silver medal in synchronized diving at the 2012 Summer Olympics while an undergraduate at Duke; competed in the 2016 Summer Olympics while attending Duke Medical School
- Randy Jones, competed in four Olympics as member of U.S. bobsledding teams
- Sophie Jones (B.A. 2022), professional soccer player
- Jacob Kasper, professional wrestler
- John Kerr, soccer player; winner of Hermann Trophy for top collegian; first American player in the Football League First Division (now known as the Premiership); Duke's men's soccer head coach
- Sherrill Kester (B.A. 1999), former professional soccer player
- Vania King, former professional tennis player
- Jason Kreis, professional soccer player and coach
- Alison Levine (M.B.A. 2000), mountain climber and explorer; the only woman in the world to have completed the Explorers Grand Slam, reaching the summit of the highest mountain on each continent and skiing to the North and South Poles
- Alli Lipsher (B.A. 2007), former professional soccer player
- Mary Long, professional soccer player
- Marykate Loper (B.A. 2021), former professional soccer player
- Devin Lynch (B.A. 2025), professional soccer player
- Erin Marsh (B.A. 2021), track & field athlete
- Maria Mateas, professional tennis player
- Kayla McKenna (B.A. 2018), professional soccer player
- Nick McCrory, Olympic diver
- Becca Moros (B.A. 2006), former professional soccer player
- Ibtihaj Muhammad (B.A. 2007), 2016 Olympic fencer and bronze team medalist
- Lily Nabet (B.A. 2021), professional soccer player
- Mollie Pathman (B.A. 2013), former professional soccer player
- Toni Payne (B.A. 2016), professional soccer player
- Gunnar Peterson (B.A. 1985), fitness expert, author and motivational speaker
- Mackenzie Pluck (B.A. 2021), professional soccer player
- Quinn (B.A. 2017), professional soccer player
- Kat Rader (B.A. 2025), professional soccer player
- Morgan Reid (B.A. 2017), professional soccer player
- Vanessa Rousso, professional poker player
- Shannon Rowbury (B.A. 2007), professional track athlete, middle distance runner
- Jillian Schwartz, Olympic pole vaulter
- Dave Sime, champion sprinter, won a silver medal at the 1960 Rome Olympics
- Andrew Skurka (A.B. 2003), first person to complete the 7,700 sea-to-sea-route spanning North America
- Rebecca Smith (B.A. 2003), former professional soccer player
- Steven Solomon, Australian track and field, 2012 Olympics, Duke indoor 400m record holder
- Jessica Rae Springsteen (B.A. 2014), nationally ranked equestrian; daughter of Bruce Springsteen
- Ella Stevens (B.A. 2019), professional soccer player
- Becca Ward, 2008 Olympic bronze medalist in fencing; three-time NCAA champion in individual women's sabre (2009, 2011, 2012)
- Andrew Wenger, professional soccer player and first draft pick in the 2012 MLS SuperDraft

== Faculty ==
=== Current ===
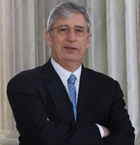
Walter E. Dellinger III

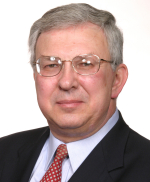
Henry Petroski

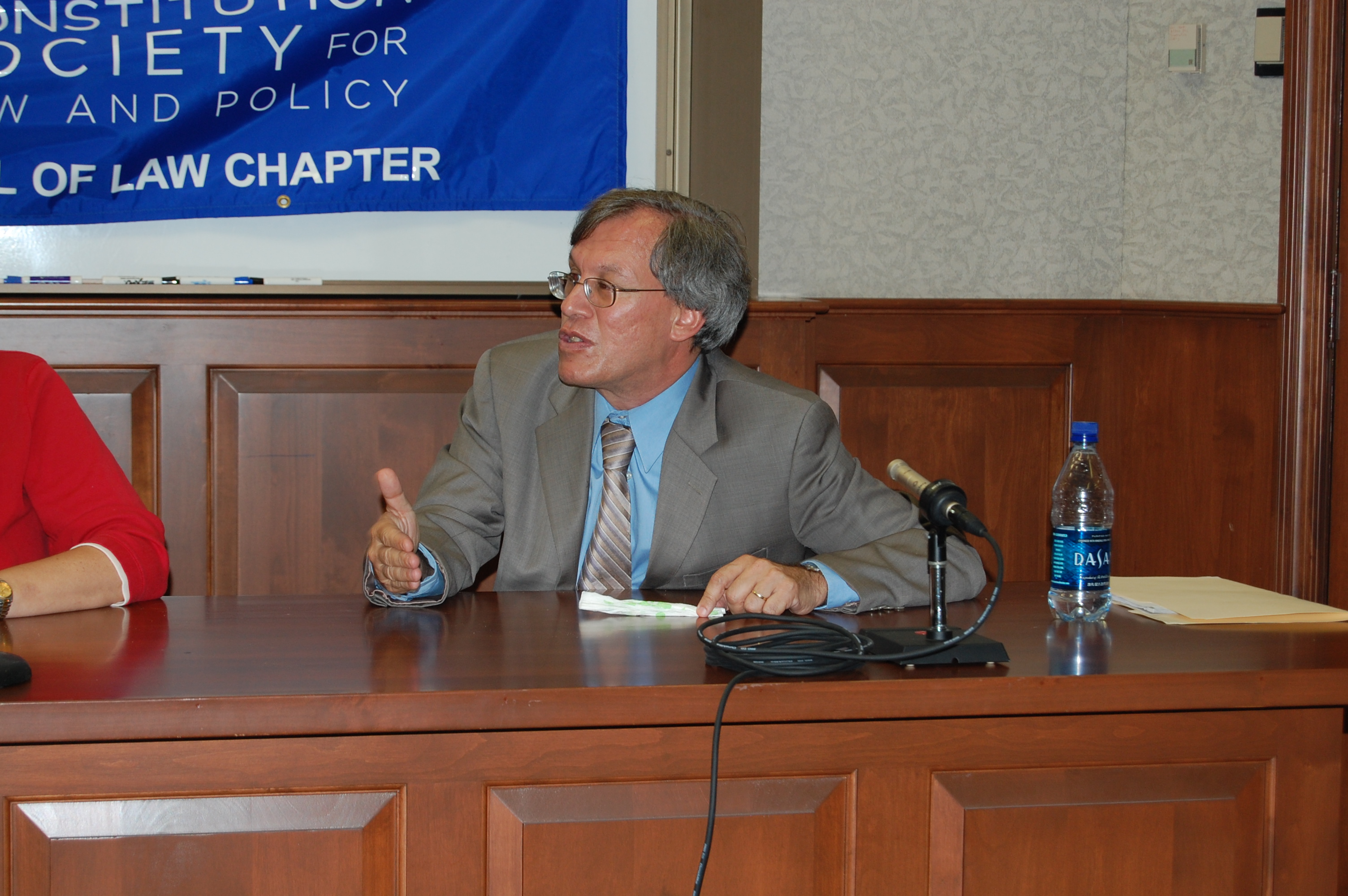
Erwin Chemerinsky

- Bill Adair, founder of the website PolitiFact
- David Aers, James B. Duke Professor of English, expert on medieval and Renaissance literature and theology
- Pankaj K. Agarwal, computer scientist, known for his research on computational geometry
- Susan Alberts, primatologist, co-director of Amboseli Baboon Research Project
- John Aldrich, political scientist, fellow of the American Academy of Arts and Sciences
- Samuel Alito, associate justice of the US Supreme Court
- Nancy Andrews, vice chancellor for academic affairs and dean of the Duke University School of Medicine
- Dan Ariely, professor of behavioral economics, author of Predictably Irrational
- Nancy Armstrong, Gilbert, Louis and Edward Lehrman Professor of English; critic of 18th- and 19th-century novels; editor of Novel: A Forum on Fiction
- Frank Asche, marine economist
- Valerie Ashby, dean of Trinity College of Arts and Sciences
- Owen Astrachan (M.S. 1989, Ph.D. 1992), distinguished computer scientist
- Emanuel Azenberg, producer of American theater who has won 40 Tony awards
- Lorena S. Beese, biochemist, fellow of the National Academy of Sciences
- Adrian Bejan, mechanical engineering professor, inventor of constructal theory and namesake of the Bejan number
- Ravi V. Bellamkonda, biomedical engineer
- Peter B. Bennett, founder and former president and CEO of the Divers Alert Network
- Philip Bennett, former managing editor of The Washington Post
- James Berger, statistician, member of the National Academy of Sciences, recipient of a Guggenheim Fellowship
- Paul Berliner, ethnomusicologist
- Chris Beyrer, director of the Duke Global Health Institute, member of the National Academy of Medicine
- Tim Bollerslev, economist, expert on autoregressive conditional heteroskedasticity
- Raphael M. Bonelli, professor of neurology and psychiatry
- James Boyle, William Neal Reynolds Professor of Law
- Hubert Bray, mathematician, known for having proved the Riemannian Penrose inequality
- Geoffrey Brennan, philosopher associated with rational actor theory
- David Brooks, columnist for The New York Times
- Thomas Brothers, musicologist, received a Guggenheim Fellowship in 2009
- Kelly D. Brownell, scientist, professor, expert on obesity; named as one of "The World's 100 Most Influential People" by Time magazine in 2006
- Frank Bruni, columnist for The New York Times
- Caroline Bruzelius, art historian, expert on medieval architecture
- Robert Bryant, chairman of the Mathematical Sciences Research Institute, fellow of the American Mathematical Society, member of the National Academy of Sciences
- Allen Buchanan, philosopher
- Al Buehler, chairman of the Health, Physical Education, and Recreation department; United States Olympic track coach at the 1972, 1984, and 1988 Summer Olympics; member of North Carolina Sports Hall of Fame
- Robert Calderbank, former vice president of AT&T; recipient of the Shannon Award in electrical engineering
- Bruce Caldwell, economist
- Blanche Capel, James B. Duke Professor of Cell Biology
- William Chafe, American historian
- Yuan-Tsong Chen, physician scientist, known for developing a recombinant enzyme replacement therapy for Pompe disease
- Rey Chow, postcolonial, cultural critic
- Dorie Clark, author and executive education professor
- Sarah Cohen, Pulitzer Prize–winning journalist
- Chelsea Cook, politician, professor of law
- Philip J. Cook, professor of public policy
- Miriam Cooke, literary critic
- Missy Cummings, professor of aeronautics, one of the US Navy's first female fighter pilots
- Ingrid Daubechies, first female president of the International Mathematical Union; recipient of MacArthur Fellowship, Guggenheim Fellowship, and NAS Award in Mathematics
- Cathy Davidson, author
- Geraldine Dawson, former chief science officer of Autism Speaks
- Walter E. Dellinger III, law professor, former United States solicitor general under President Bill Clinton
- Martin E. Dempsey, former chairman of the Joint Chiefs of Staff
- Kenneth A. Dodge, psychologist
- Bruce Donald, computer scientist, fellow of the Association for Computing Machinery and the IEE, recipient of the Presidential Young Investigator Award and a Guggenheim Fellowship
- Ariel Dorfman, novelist, playwright, human rights activist, 1992 winner of the Laurence Olivier Award
- Fred Dretske, philosopher of mind, winner of the Jean Nicod Prize
- Prasenjit Duara, historian
- Patrick Duddy, former ambassador to Venezuela
- Charles J. Dunlap Jr., deputy Judge Advocate General
- Rick Durrett, mathematician, fellow of the National Academy of Sciences
- Victor J. Dzau, James B. Duke Professor of Medicine; pioneering translational research scientist
- Herbert Edelsbrunner, computer scientist, winner of the Alan T. Waterman Award
- Carla Ellis, computer scientist, fellow of the Association for Computing Machinery
- Sir Harold Evans, author; editor of The Times; exposed Soviet spies
- Wendy Ewald, photographer, awarded a MacArthur Fellowship in 1992
- Peter Feaver, political scientist; served on the National Security Council staff under Presidents Bill Clinton and George W. Bush
- Michael Ferejohn, expert on ancient philosophy
- Eric Finkelstein, health economist, professor at Duke-NUS Medical School
- Anne Firor Scott, historian, recipient of the National Humanities Medal
- Owen Flanagan, philosopher of mind, Phi Beta Kappa Romanell lecturer
- Allen Frances, world-renowned psychiatrist
- Aaron D. Franklin, electrical engineer, nanotechnology researcher, and professor
- John Hope Franklin, civil rights activist, historian, awarded Presidential Medal of Freedom by President Bill Clinton
- Ernestine Friedl, professor emerita in cultural anthropology; former president of the American Ethnological Society and the American Anthropological Association; known for her work on gender roles, rural life in modern Greece, and the St. Croix Chippewa Indians of Wisconsin
- Allan Friedman, neurosurgeon
- Takanori Fukushima, neurosurgeon
- Connel Fullenkamp, director of undergraduate studies in economics, member of the IMF's finance team
- Alan Enoch Gelfand, James B. Duke Professor of Statistics and Decision Sciences
- Sharon Gerecht, biomedical engineer; member of the National Academy of Medicine
- David Gergen, former Duke professor; Duke trustee; adviser to Presidents Nixon, Ford, Reagan, and Clinton
- Michael Allen Gillespie, political scientist
- Jay Golden, environmental engineer
- David Goldstein, population geneticist
- Mark Goodacre, theologian
- Matthias Gromeier, developer of the PVSRIPO virus that has recently shown to be effective in treating cancer
- Gordon Hammes, biochemist, member of the National Academy of Sciences
- Moo-Young Han, discoverer of the quark color charge
- Michael Hardt, literature professor and Marxist, co-author with Antonio Negri of Empire and Multitude
- Brian Hare, evolutionary anthropologist, director of Duke Canine Cognition Center
- Campbell Harvey, economist
- Hashim Al-Hashimi, James B. Duke Professor of Chemistry and Molecular Biology; recipient of the 2020 NAS Award in Molecular Biology
- Stanley Hauerwas, theologian and author
- N. Katherine Hayles, postmodern literary critic; fellow of the American Academy of Arts and Sciences
- Richard B. Hays, theologian
- Sheng Yang He, plant biologist; member of the National Academy of Sciences; Howard Hughes Medical Institute investigator
- Kieran Healy, Irish sociologist
- Dan Heath, bestselling author of Made to Stick
- Amy H. Herring, biostatistician
- Oscar Hijuelos, novelist; first Hispanic to win a Pulitzer Prize for fiction
- Brigid Hogan, developmental biologist; member of the National Academy of Sciences, Institute of Medicine, and fellow of the American Academy of Arts and Sciences
- Kevin Hoover, economist
- Jerry F. Hough, political scientist, author, and professor
- Calvin Howell, physicist
- Tony Jun Huang, William Bevan Professor of Mechanical Engineering and Materials Science
- Reinhard Hütter, Catholic theologian
- Fredric Jameson, Marxist literary theorist; former chair of the Literature Program
- Andrew Janiak, philosopher
- Ashley E. Jardina, political scientist and author
- Erich Jarvis, neurobiologist, professor at Rockefeller University
- Abdul Sattar Jawad, literary theorist, fled Mustansiriya University after the 2003 Invasion of Iraq
- Bruce Jentleson, director of Sanford Institute of Public Policy; Senior Foreign Policy Advisor to vice president Al Gore
- Wu Jinglian, economist
- Kimberly S. Johnson, professor of medicine and director of Duke REACH Equity (Duke Center for Research to Advance Health Care Equity)
- Nan Marie Jokerst, electrical engineer, in the Duke University Pratt School of Engineering, Triangle Women in STEM leader
- James A. Joseph, former U.S. ambassador to South Africa
- Samuel Katz, virologist, known for the development of the measles vaccine
- Richard Kay, paleontologist
- David Kirsch, oncologist
- Alexander Kiselev, mathematician
- Peter Klopfer, zoologist, civil rights advocate and educator
- Jack Knight, legal theorist
- Harold G. Koenig, psychiatrist
- Claudia Koonz, feminist historian
- Sally Kornbluth, provost and James B. Duke Professor of pharmacology and cancer biology
- Ashutosh Kotwal, Fritz London Distinguished Professor of Physics, fellow of AAAS, APS and Sloan Foundation
- Rachel Kranton, economist, fellow of the Econometric Society, recipient of the Blaise Pascal Chair
- Timur Kuran, Turkish economist
- Pedro Lasch, artist and assistant research professor, Department of Art, Art History, and Visual Studies
- Bruce Lawrence, Nancy and Jeffrey Marcus Humanities Professor of Religion
- Kara Lawson, Duke women's basketball head coach (2020–present)
- Mark Leary, psychologist
- Frank Lentricchia, literary critic
- David F. Levi, jurist
- Nan Lin, sociologist
- Jason Locasale, professor of pharmacology, internationally recognized for his contributions to the modern understanding of metabolism
- Martin J. Lohse, German physician and pharmacologist doing research on G protein-coupled receptors
- Julian Lombardi, computer scientist, inventor
- Nathaniel Mackey, poet and novelist, recipient of the 2015 Bollingen Prize and the 2014 Ruth Lilly Poetry Prize
- Nancy MacLean, historian
- Bruce Maggs, professor of computer science, founding employee of Akamai Technologies
- Robert Malkin, biomedical engineer, fellow of the American Institute for Medical and Biological Engineering
- J. Lorand Matory, chair of the department of African and African American Studies
- Achille Mbembe, philosopher and political scientist
- Mark McCahill, creator of Internet Gopher, POP mail, and Croquet; coined the phrase "surfing the Web"
- Mark McClellan, former Commissioner of the Food and Drug Administration
- Thomas Carlos Mehen, nuclear physicist
- Walter Mignolo, literary theorist
- Terrie Moffitt, pioneering researcher in the development of antisocial behavior
- Toril Moi, literary theorist associated with feminist theory
- Christopher Monroe, quantum physicist, member of the National Academy of Sciences
- Ebrahim Moosa, religious scholar
- V. Y. Mudimbe, philosopher associated with philosophy of language, phenomenology, and structuralism
- Norman Myers, British environmentalist
- Mark Anthony Neal, author
- Lenhard Ng, mathematician, child mathematical prodigy
- Miguel Nicolelis, pioneer of brain-machine interfaces
- Mohamed Noor, evolutionary biologist; 2008 recipient of the Darwin–Wallace Medal
- Wayne Norman, expert on political philosophy
- Jean Fox O'Barr, feminist teacher, scholar, and administrator; founded women's studies program at Duke
- Linwood Pendleton, former chief economist of the National Oceanic and Atmospheric Administration
- Henry Petroski, civil engineer and writer
- Arlie Petters, pioneer in the mathematical theory and mathematical physics of gravitational lensing; professor of mathematics, physics, and business administration
- Lillian Pierce, mathematician
- Orrin H. Pilkey, geologist
- Robert Plonsey, biomedical engineer, member of the National Academy of Engineering
- Amilcare Porporato, civil engineer
- Reynolds Price, author and professor of literature
- Kathy Alexis Psomiades, associate professor of English, specializing in Victorian poetry and novel theory
- Dale Purves, professor of Neurobiology and medical doctor
- Anne Pusey, primatologist, director of Jane Goodall Institute Research Center
- Jonathan D. Quick, family physician and public health management specialist who focuses on global health security
- Christian R. H. Raetz, professor of biochemistry and member of the National Academy of Sciences
- Sarah Bloom Raskin, former member of the Board of Governors of the Federal Reserve System, former U.S. deputy secretary of the treasury
- William Raspberry, Knight Professor of the Practice of Communications and Journalism; syndicated columnist for The Washington Post; Pulitzer Prize winner
- Paul Rehak, archaeologist
- Madan M. Rehani, medical physicist
- John Reif, computer scientist; fellow of the AAAS, IEEE and ACM
- Michael Reiter, James B. Duke Professor of Computer Science, fellow of the ACM
- Jane S. Richardson, professor of biochemistry; developed the Richardson diagram, or ribbon diagram, method of representing the 3D structure of proteins, MacArthur Fellow
- Alexander Rosenberg, philosopher; winner of Lakatos Award in philosophy of science, Phi Beta Kappa Romanell lecturer
- Benjamin Rossman, computer scientist
- Kathy Rudy, social constructionist
- Omid Safi, professor of Islamic Studies
- David H. Sanford, philosopher
- Nicola Scafetta, physicist
- Tad Schmaltz, editor of the Journal of the History of Philosophy
- Christopher H. Schroeder, former assistant attorney general for the Office of Legal Policy for the United States Department of Justice
- Barbara Ramsay Shaw, chemist, cancer researcher, expert on signal transduction
- Walter Sinnott-Armstrong, philosopher
- David Smith, invisibility cloak pioneer; awarded the Descartes Prize in 2005
- Tommy Sowers, assistant secretary for Public and Intergovernmental Affairs at the US Department of Veterans Affairs
- J. E. R. Staddon, behavioral psychologist
- Orin Starn, cultural anthropologist
- Kristine Stiles, art historian
- Vahid Tarokh, electrical engineer, recipient of a Guggenheim fellowship
- John Terborgh, conservation biologist, awarded a MacArthur Fellowship in 1992, and the Daniel Giraud Elliot Medal of the National Academy of Sciences in 1996
- Jenny Tung, evolutionary anthropologist, awarded a MacArthur Fellowship in 2019
- Timothy Tyson, historian
- Cindy Lee Van Dover, professor of biological oceanography
- Hans J. Van Miegroet, professor of art history
- Tuan Vo-Dinh, biophysicist
- Olaf von Ramm, Thomas Lord Professor of Engineering; first patent on a 3-D ultrasound
- Geoffrey Wainwright, Methodist theologian
- Xiao-Fan Wang, cancer biologist
- E. Roy Weintraub, economist
- Ben Wildman-Tobriner, physician; Olympic gold medalist
- Huntington F. Willard, human geneticist; former president of American Society of Human Genetics; member of the National Academy of Sciences
- E.O. Wilson, biologist, "father of sociobiology and biodiversity", National Medal of Science (1976)
- Lauren Winner, author and journalist
- Judy Woodruff, news anchor, journalist
- Vanessa Woods, internationally published Australian scientist, author and journalist
- Weitao Yang, chemist
- Anne Yoder, biologist, director of Duke Lemur Center
- Hongkai Zhao, mathematician
- Anthony Zinni, decorated general

=== Former ===
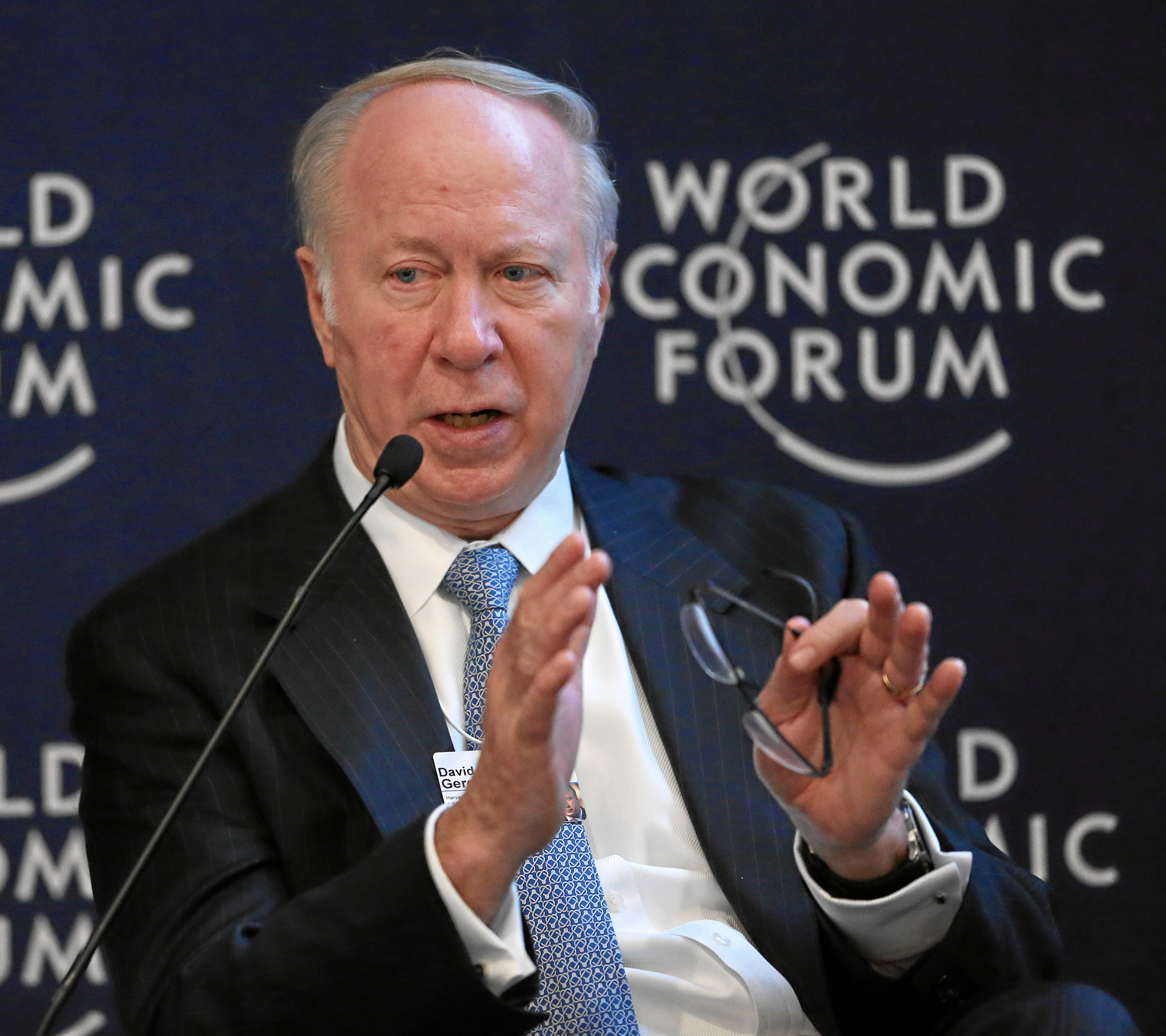
David Gergen

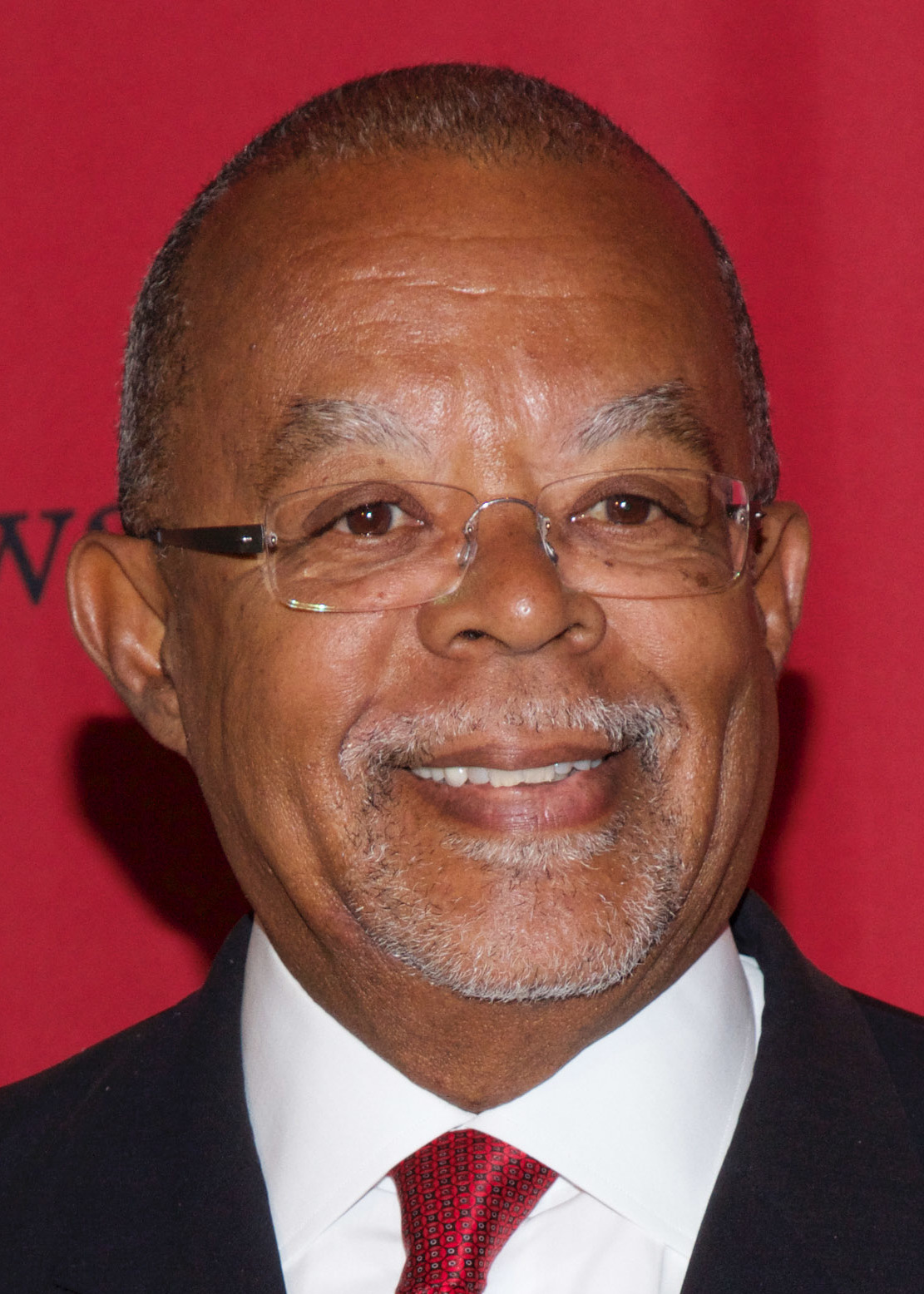
Henry Louis Gates

- Frances Dorothy Acomb, historian
- D. Bernard Amos, immunologist; member of the National Academy of Sciences
- Norman B. Anderson, CEO of the American Psychological Association
- Kwame Anthony Appiah, philosopher, author of In My Father's House and The Ethics of Identity
- Srinivas Aravamudan, professor of English, literature and Romance studies; dean of humanities; specialist in 18th-century and postcolonial literature; author
- Clay Armstrong, physiologist; recipient of the Albert Lasker Award for Basic Medical Research and the Gairdner Foundation International Award for contributions to medical science
- James Arthur, mathematician, former president of the American Mathematical Society
- George James Augustine, neuroscientist
- Katharine Banham, associate professor of psychology, emerita
- John Spencer Bassett, historian who initiated the Bassett Affair, an important victory for academic freedom
- Robert Bates, Eaton Professor in the Department of Government at Harvard University
- Upendra Baxi, legal scholar
- Andrea Bertozzi, mathematician
- Helen Bevington, poet and author
- Utpal Bhattacharya, expert on business ethics
- Wolfgang Bibel, one of the founders of the research area of artificial intelligence in Germany and Europe
- Lawrence Biedenharn, theoretical nuclear physicist
- Harry Binswanger, objectivist philosopher and philosopher of mind
- Mary L. Boas, mathematician
- Ralph Boas, mathematician, recipient of the Lester R. Ford Award
- James Bonk, chemist; Dean's Distinguished Service Award in recognition of 50 years of teaching
- Edgar Bowers, poet, For Louis Pasteur, Bollingen Prize in Poetry in 1989, Guggenheim Fellowship twice
- Joseph Penn Breedlove (B.A. 1898, M.A. 1902), first university librarian
- David S. Broder, current Washington Post and former New York Times reporter
- H. Keith H. Brodie, psychiatrist, educator and eventual president of Duke
- David Allan Bromley, nuclear physicist, scientific advisor to US President George H. W. Bush, recipient of National Medal of Science (1988)
- Hubie Brown, assistant men's basketball coach (1969–1972); NBA coach and commentator
- John Buettner-Janusch, anthropologist
- John Burness, president of Franklin & Marshall College
- Michael Byers, Canadian legal scholar and nonfiction author
- Tina Campt, associate professor of women's studies and history; director of Graduate Studies
- Leonard Carlitz, mathematician
- Ziv Carmon, professor of business administration at INSEAD
- Horace Casey, electrical engineer
- John W. Cell, professor of history at Duke
- Erwin Chemerinsky, law professor, constitutional scholar
- Randolph Chitwood, first cardio-thoracic surgeon to perform robot-assisted heart valve surgery in North America
- Amy Chua, best-selling author
- George Elliott Clarke, author, poet
- G. Wayne Clough, president of the Georgia Institute of Technology
- Kalman J. Cohen, economist, pioneer of market micro-structure
- Roger Corless, theologian who made significant contributions to interfaith dialogue
- John Shelton Curtiss, historian, James B. Duke Professor
- Chuck Daly, assistant men's basketball coach (1963–1969); NBA coach
- Barun De, historian
- Sara J. Dent, anaesthesiologist
- Burton Drayer, radiologist; authority on the use of computed tomography (CT) and magnetic resonance imaging (MRI) for diagnosing neurological disorders
- Mike Duffy, television host
- Eleanor Lansing Dulles, politician involved in the affairs of post-World War II Germany, Bretton Woods Conference, US State Department
- Paul Ebert, cardiovascular surgeon
- Michael Ehlers, chief scientific officer at life sciences venture capital firm Apple Tree Partners
- Elliot Engel, writer, dramatist, and lecturer
- William M. Fairbank, physicist known for his work on liquid helium; member of the National Academy of Sciences
- Stanley Fish, former chair of the English Department, deconstructionist literary critic
- Wallace Fowlie, author and poet, awarded a Guggenheim Fellowship in 1947
- Clara Franzini-Armstrong, cell biologist, member of the National Academy of Sciences
- Bertram Fraser-Reid, organic chemist
- Robert C. Frasure, ambassador to Estonia
- Henry Louis Gates, chair of African-American Studies at Harvard
- Erol Gelenbe, computer scientist, known for introducing the random neural network and the eponymous G-networks
- David Gergen, political analyst, adviser to Presidents Nixon, Ford, Reagan, and Clinton
- John Jay Gergen, mathematician
- S. Malcolm Gillis, prominent economist, former president of Rice University
- René Girard, philosopher, literary critic, and historian; member of the Académie française
- Gail Goestenkors, Duke women's basketball head coach (1992–2007)
- Peter J. Gomes, preacher and theologian from Harvard University's Divinity School
- Craufurd Goodwin, economist
- Lawrence Goodwyn, writer and political theorist
- Andrew Gordon, Japanese historian
- Walter Gordy, physicist, member of the National Academy of Sciences
- Phillip Griffiths, mathematician; fellow of the American Mathematical Society, recipient of the Wolf Prize
- Paul Magnus Gross, chemist, former president of the American Association for the Advancement of Science
- Julia Grout, chair of the Women's Department of Health and Physical Education, 1924–1964
- Allan Gurganus, author
- William Baskerville Hamilton, historian
- Philip Handler, biochemist; two-term president of the National Academy of Sciences; winner of the National Medal of Science
- Gerald Heard, philosopher, historian
- Robert L. Hill, biochemist; member of the National Academy of Sciences
- Charles Honorton, parapsychologist
- Calvin B. Hoover, founder of the field of comparative economic systems, awarded the Presidential Medal of Freedom by Harry Truman in 1947
- Sally Hughes-Schrader, zoologist, fellow of the American Academy of Arts and Sciences
- Aldous Huxley, novelist, mystic
- Jacquelyne Jackson, sociologist
- Daniel James, British historian
- Harold Jenkins
- Randy Jirtle, biologist, known for his contribution to the field of epigenetics
- Kristina M. Johnson, under secretary of energy for the Obama Administration; former dean of the Pratt School of Engineering; former director of Boston Scientific Corporation
- Simon Johnson, former chief economist of the International Monetary Fund
- Wolfgang Joklik, virologist, member of the National Academy of Sciences
- Edward E. Jones, social psychologist, developed fundamental attribution error
- Alice Kaplan, author, chair of the French department at Yale
- Lawrence C. Katz, neurobiologist
- Randall Kenan, author
- Robert Keohane, neoliberal scholar of international relations
- Kim Sung-Hou, structural biologist and biophysicist, member of the National Academy of Sciences
- Claudia Koonz, feminist historian
- Stephen Kovacs (1972–2022), saber fencer and fencing coach; at Duke he mentored three-time NCAA women's saber champion Becca Ward; later accused of sexually assaulting two fencing students elsewhere; died in prison in 2022
- Paul J. Kramer, biologist, member of the National Academy of Sciences
- Juanita M. Kreps, United States secretary of commerce
- Anne O. Krueger, World Bank chief economist
- Weston La Barre, anthropologist, worked in ethnography
- Thomas LaBean, leading researcher in the field of DNA nanotechnology
- Howard Nathaniel Lee, former mayor of Chapel Hill, North Carolina
- Bernard Lefkowitz, sociologist, journalist, investigative reporter
- Raphael Lemkin, human rights activist; coined the word "genocide"
- H. Gregg Lewis, labor economist
- Sarah Lisanby, psychiatrist
- Michael L. Littman, computer scientist
- Daniel A. Livingstone, limnologist, recipient of the G. Evelyn Hutchinson Award
- Fritz London, physicist, won the Lorentz Medal
- Alasdair MacIntyre, philosopher, virtue ethicist
- John Madey, developer of the free electron laser
- Ernest Mario, pharmaceutical industry executive
- Joanne P. McCallie, Duke women's basketball head coach (2007–2020)
- Mathew D. McCubbins, Ruth F. De Varney Professor of Political Science and professor of Law
- William McDougall, psychologist, author of An Introduction to Social Psychology
- George McLendon, biochemist, winner of Eli Lilly Award in Biological Chemistry and Guggenheim fellowship
- Warren Meck, neuroscientist
- Karl Menger, mathematician
- Edwin Mims, professor of English literature
- Marie Lynn Miranda, data scientist and children's environmental health researcher
- John Wilson Moore, pioneering biophysicist
- Alberto Moreiras, professor of Romance Studies
- David R. Morrison, mathematician; Guggenheim Fellow; member of the American Academy of Arts and Sciences
- Thom Mount, film producer; president of the Producers Guild of America
- Francis Joseph Murray, mathematician and founder of functional analysis; winner of the Outstanding Civilian Service Medal
- Toshio Narahashi, pharmacologist, "founding father of neurotoxicology"
- Karen Neander, philosopher of mind
- Charles Nemeroff, psychiatrist, known for work in treating depression
- Hans Neurath, biochemist, leading researcher in the field of protein chemistry
- Laura Niklason, professor of anesthesiology and biomedical engineering
- Lothar Wolfgang Nordheim, theoretical physicist
- Albert Outler, Methodist theologian
- G. B. Pegram, key administrator of Manhattan Project
- William Howell Pegram, chemist
- Sallie Permar, pediatrician-in-chief at Weill Cornell Medical Center; chair of the Department of Pediatrics at Weill Cornell Medicine
- Anton Peterlin, physicist
- Ernest C. Pollard, professor of biophysics
- David Price, United States representative
- James Rachels, philosopher and cultural relativist
- Stojan Radic, electrical engineer
- Joseph B. Rhine, psychologist and parapsychologist; founder of modern studies of psychical phenomena
- Louisa E. Rhine, parapsychologist
- Sidarta Ribeiro, Brazilian neuroscientist
- John Ridpath, intellectual historian
- Sócrates Rizzo, former mayor of Monterrey; former governor of Nuevo León
- Dennis A. Rondinelli, international development policy expert at the Sanford School of Public Policy
- Mary Ellen Rudin, mathematician
- David Sabiston, cardiac surgeon, one of the pioneers of coronary bypass surgery
- Guy Salvesen, biochemist, known for his work in the field of apoptosis
- E. P. Sanders, British Academy member; leading figure in the third Historical Jesus movement
- Michael Scharf, lawyer, nominated for the Nobel Peace Prize in 2005
- David Scheffer, diplomat
- William H. Schlesinger, biogeochemist, president of the Cary Institute of Ecosystem Studies
- Knut Schmidt-Nielsen, figure in the field of comparative physiology, member of the National Academy of Sciences
- Eve Kosofsky Sedgwick, feminist theorist, literary theorist, expert in gender studies
- Lori Ann Setton, biomedical engineer
- Michael Sheetz, cell biologist, recipient of the Albert Lasker Award for Basic Medical Research
- Beth A. Simmons, international relations scholar, member of the National Academy of Sciences
- Elwyn L. Simons, paleontologist and primate conservationist
- Barbara Herrnstein Smith, literary theorist
- Brian Cantwell Smith, scholar who conducts research in the fields of cognitive science, computer science, information studies, philosophy, and ontology
- Cordwainer Smith, author
- Joseph Tyree Sneed III, U.S. deputy attorney general, judge on the U.S. Court of Appeals for the Ninth Circuit
- Ralph Snyderman, biotech entrepreneur
- David Soskice, political economist
- Joseph J. Spengler, economist, statistician, and historian of economic thought
- Hertha Sponer, physicist
- Eugene A. Stead, medical educator, founder of the physician assistant profession
- William Stern, psychologist, philosopher
- Kenneth B. Storey, professor of biochemistry and molecular biology
- Charles Tanford, protein chemist, member of the National Academy of Sciences
- Edward D. Thalmann, expert in hyperbaric medicine
- Fritz Thurstone (1932–2005), pioneer of ultrasound technology
- Paul Tillich, theologian
- Peter Ungar, paleoanthropologist
- Sander Vanocur, ABC and NBC correspondent; The Washington Post television editor; The New York Times reporter
- W. Kip Viscusi, economist
- Steven Vogel, biologist, James B. Duke Professor of Biology
- Robert Ward, composer
- Kenny J. Williams, author, winner of the MidAmerica Award
- Mary Lou Williams, composer
- Patricia J. Williams, legal scholar, awarded a MacArthur Fellowship in 2000
- William H. Willimon, Methodist theologian
- Eric Winer, medical oncologist
- Kwasi Wiredu, philosopher
- Karl Zener, psychologist

=== Men's basketball head coaches ===
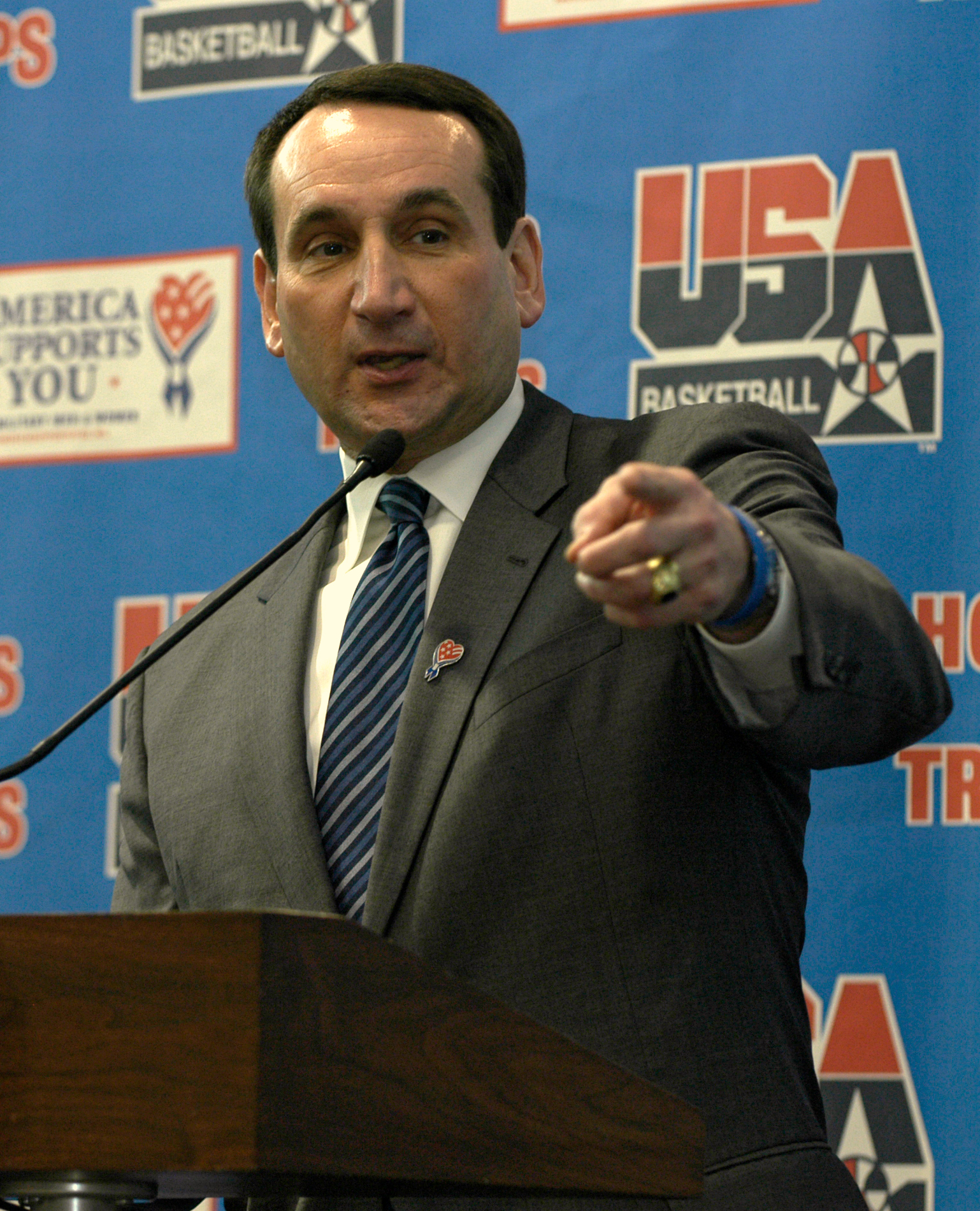
Mike Krzyzewski

- 2022 to present: Jon Scheyer
- 1981 to 2022: Mike Krzyzewski, five-time national champion men's basketball coach, member of the Basketball Hall of Fame
- 1975 to 1980: Bill Foster
- 1974: Neill McGeachy
- 1970 to 1973: Bucky Waters
- 1960 to 1969: Vic Bubas, member of the North Carolina Sports Hall of Fame
- 1951 to 1959: Harold Bradley
- 1943 to 1950: Gerry Gerard
- 1929 to 1942: Eddie Cameron, namesake of Cameron Indoor Stadium and member of the North Carolina Sports Hall of Fame
- 1925 to 1928: George Buchheit
- 1923 to 1924: J.S. Burbage
- 1922: James Baldwin
- 1921: Floyd Egan
- 1920: W.J. Rothensies
- 1919: H.P. Cole
- 1917 to 1918: Chick Doak
- 1916: Bob Doak
- 1914 to 1915: Noble Clay
- 1913: Joseph Brinn
- 1906 to 1912: W.W. Card

=== Football head coaches ===
- 2024 to present: Manny Diaz
- 2022 to 2024: Mike Elko
- 2007 to 2021: David Cutcliffe
- 2003 to 2007: Ted Roof
- 1999 to 2003: Carl Franks
- 1994 to 1998: Fred Goldsmith
- 1990 to 1993: Barry Wilson
- 1987 to 1989: Steve Spurrier, ACC Coach of the Year in 1988 and 1989
- 1983 to 1986: Steve Sloan
- 1979 to 1982: Shirley "Red" Wilson
- 1971 to 1978: Mike McGee
- 1966 to 1970: Tom Harp
- 1951 to 1965: William D. "Bill" Murray
- 1946 to 1950: Wallace W. Wade
- 1942 to 1945: Eddie Cameron, namesake of Cameron Indoor Stadium and member of the North Carolina Sports Hall of Fame
- 1931 to 1941: Wallace W. Wade, namesake of Wallace Wade Stadium and member of the College Football Hall of Fame
- 1926 to 1930: James "Jimmy" DeHart
- 1925: James P. "Pat" Herron
- 1924: Howard H. Jones
- 1923: S.M. Alexander
- 1922: Herman Steiner
- 1921: James A. Baldwin
- 1920: Floyd J. Egan
- 1888 to 1889 : Dr. John F. Crowell

== Duke University presidents ==
President	Tenure
Brantley York	1838–1842
Braxton Craven	1842–1863
William Trigg Gannaway*	1864–1865
*Appointed president pro tempore during the break in Craven's presidency
Braxton Craven	1866–1882
Marquis Lafayette Wood	1883–1886
John Franklin Crowell	1887–1894
John Carlisle Kilgo	1894–1910
William Preston Few	1910–1924
University officially established as Duke University in 1924
William Preston Few	1924–1940
Robert Lee Flowers	1941–1948
Arthur Hollis Edens	1949–1960
Julian Deryl Hart	1960–1963
Douglas Knight	1963–1969
Terry Sanford	1969–1985
H. Keith H. Brodie	1985–1993
Nannerl O. Keohane	1993–2004
Richard H. Brodhead	2004–2017
Vincent E. Price	2017–present

== Major philanthropists ==
Donors who have contributed at least $20 million to the university, or founding donors:

Donor	Total amount	Year	Purpose
The Duke Endowment	$1.5+ billion (in 2026 dollars)	1924– 2026	The Duke Endowment is a private foundation endowed by James B. Duke to support education, health, religious and civic life in the Carolinas. Its principal recipient is Duke University. As of 2026, the largest single grant is $100 million in honor of the university's centennial.
James B. Duke	$40 million ($1.41 billion in 2026 dollars)	1924	For West Campus and Duke Forest land, construction, operations and endowment
Gates Foundation	$270+ million	2002–2026	Selected grants include $46.5 million for AIDS research, $32 million for HIV prevention, $30 million for a new science facility, $25 million for an endowment campaign, $20 million for the Duke Global Health Initiative, $15 million for DukeEngage, a civic engagement program, $13 million supporting development in Africa, and $10 million for student financial aid. The full list of grants is available at the Gates Foundation website.
Lord Corporation	$261 million	2019	Unrestricted
Peter and Ginny Nicholas	$115+ million	1999– 2023	$20 million for the School of the Environment and Earth Sciences; $70 million pledged in 2003 for the School of the Environment fully paid by 2022; $25 million pledged in 2023
David Rubenstein	$100+ million	2002–2017	More than $100 million in total, including $25 million towards a new performing arts center, $20 million for undergraduate scholarships, $13.6 million to Duke Libraries, $20.75 million to the Sanford School of Public Policy, $10 million to Duke athletics
Bruce and Martha Karsh	$85 million	2005–2011	For student financial aid
Anne and Robert Bass	$70 million	1996–2013	$20 million for the FOCUS program and various endowed chairs, $50 million for interdisciplinary research
Edmund T. Pratt Jr.	$35 million ($70 million in 2026 dollars)	1999	To endow the School of Engineering
Disque Deane	$20 million ($58 million in 2026 dollars)	1986	To "establish a research institute on the human future"
J. Michael and Christine Pearson	$52.5 million	2014	$30 million to the Pratt School of Engineering to advance engineering and science education, $15 million to the School of Nursing and $7.5 million to the Fuqua School of Business
Bill and Melinda Gates	$20 million ($40 million in 2026 dollars)	1998	For undergraduate scholarships
David H. Murdock	$35 million	2007	For translational medical research by the Duke Medical School
Pierre Lamond	$30 million	2026	For the department of electrical and computer science
Dr. Steven and Rebecca Scott	$30 million	2012–2013	$20 million for Duke Sports Medicine and $10 million for Duke athletics
Dudley Rauch	$30 million	2021	For medical student scholarships
Mary Duke Biddle Foundation	~$28 million	1956–present	The Foundation's charter requires it to distribute at least half of its funds to Duke University. The Foundation distributed "nearly $44 million in grants" from 1956-2016, meaning almost $22 million went to Duke. Annual IRS reports available from 2017 to 2024 show additional total annual giving of $11.89 million, or $5.945 million to Duke, with a 2024 remaining endowment of $43 million. None of these numbers have been adjusted for inflation.
Jack O. Bovender Jr.	$27.5 million	2006–2014	$10 million for Trinity College, $10 million for the Fuqua School of Business Health Sector Management Program, and $5 million for School of Nursing, $1.5 million for a professorship at Duke Divinity School, and $1 million for a scholarship for minority students in the Health Sector Management Program
Robert Margolis	$26.5 million	2015–2023	For the Margolis Center for Health Policy
Michael J. and Patty Fitzpatrick	$25 million	2000	For a center for advanced photonics and communications
Ned and Karen Gilhuly	$23.75 million	2022	To support Duke's Science and Technology Initiative
William and Sue Gross	$23 million	2005	$15 million for undergraduate scholarships, $5 million for medical students' scholarships, and $3 million to support faculty members of the Fuqua School of Business
Grainger family	$20 million	2019	To the Nicholas School of the Environment
Washington Duke	$385,000 ($14 million in 2026 dollars)	1892	For original endowment and construction
Julian S. Carr	N/A	1892	Donated site of East Campus

== Fictional alumni ==
=== In film ===
- The Man in the Moon takes place as Maureen Trant, played by Emily Warfield, is preparing to attend Duke in the fall. Emma Seneshen, a character who appears briefly during the film's opening, is also mentioned to be a Duke student.
- In How to Lose a Guy in 10 Days, Benjamin Barry (portrayed by Matthew McConaughey) is shown to be a Duke alumnus.

=== In television ===
- In JAG, USMC Lt. Colonel Sarah MacKenzie (portrayed by Catherine Bell) graduated from Duke University School of Law.
- In Your Friends & Neighbors, Jules Sperling (portrayed by Jennifer Mudge) commits to Duke via Early Decision.
- In The Newsroom, Sloan Sabbath (portrayed by Olivia Munn) has two Ph.D.s from Duke.
- In The White Lotus, main characters Timothy and Saxon Ratliff (portrayed by Patrick Schwarzenegger) are Duke alumni. Duke is frequently mentioned in the show's third season.
- In One Tree Hill, Nathan Scott (portrayed by James Lafferty) receives a scholarship to play basketball at Duke, though his offer is rescinded when he is caught point shaving.
- In The West Wing, Sam Seaborn (portrayed by Rob Lowe, whose son attended Duke in real life) graduated from Duke University School of Law.
- In The Mindy Project, Dennis (portrayed by Ed Helms) majored in economics at Duke.
