= James B. Duke Professor =

Academic title at Duke University, US

At Duke University, the title of James B. Duke Distinguished Professor is given to a small number of the faculty with extraordinary records of achievement. At some universities, titles like "distinguished professor", "institute professor", or "regents professor" are counterparts of this title. Two Nobel laureates (Robert Lefkowitz and Paul L. Modrich) served as James B. Duke Professors, and another, Ingrid Daubechies received the National Medal of Science.

== Current James B. Duke Distinguished Professors ==
From the faculty listing available from the Duke University Office of the Provost.

- David Aers — English
- Huiman Xie Barnhart — biostatistics and bioinformatics
- Lorena S. Beese — biochemistry
- Emily Bernhardt — biology
- Eduardo Bonilla-Silva — sociology
- Richard Brennan — biochemistry
- Blanche Capel — cell biology
- Patrick J. Casey — pharmacology and cancer biology
- Bruce Donald — computer science
- Victor Dzau — medicine
- Erica Field — economics
- Susan Halabi — biostatistics and bioinformatics
- Mark B.N. Hansen — literature
- Joseph Heitman — molecular genetics and microbiology
- Homme Hellinga — biochemistry
- Jack D. Keene - molecular genetics and microbiology
- Garnett H. Kelsoe — immunology
- Rachel Kranton — economics
- Eric Laber — statistical science
- Hedwig Lee — sociology
- Jianfeng Lu — mathematics
- Douglas Marchuk — molecular genetics and microbiology
- Paula D. McClain — political science
- Toril Moi — literature
- Berndt Mueller — physics
- Mark Anthony Neal — African and African American Studies
- David Page — biostatistics and bioinformatics
- John R. Perfect — medicine
- Kenneth D. Poss — regenerative biology
- Sumathi Ramaswamy — history
- John F. Rawls — molecular genetics and microbiology
- Michael Reiter — computer science
- Jane S. Richardson — biochemistry
- Guillermo Sapiro — electrical and computer engineering
- David Smith — electrical and computer engineering
- Ralph Snyderman — medicine
- Beth Sullivan — molecular genetics and microbiology
- Warren S. Warren — chemistry
- Kevin Weinfurt — population health sciences
- Mark Wiesner — civil and environmental engineering
- Pei Zhou - biochemistry

== Notable James B. Duke Distinguished Professors Emeriti ==
- Allen Buchanan (emeritus) — philosophy
- Ingrid Daubechies (emeritus) — mathematics
- Rick Durrett (emeritus) — mathematics
- Owen Flanagan (emeritus) — philosophy
- Alan Enoch Gelfand (emeritus) — statistical science
- Karla F.C. Holloway (emerita) — English
- Donald L. Horowitz (emeritus) — law and political science
- Paul L. Modrich (emeritus) — biochemistry
- Orrin H. Pilkey — Earth sciences
- Anne E. Pusey (emerita) — evolutionary anthropology
- J. E. R. Staddon (emeritus) — psychology and neuroscience

== Former notable James B. Duke Distinguished Professors ==
- Dan Ariely — behavioral economics
- Robert Behringer - physics
- Ralph J. Braibanti — political science
- Louis J. Budd — English literature
- Linda Burton — sociology
- Leonard Carlitz — mathematics
- Marc G. Caron — cell biology
- John Shelton Curtiss — history
- Wallace Fowlie — French literature
- John Hope Franklin — history
- Craufurd Goodwin — economics
- Jerry Hough — political science
- Allen C. Kelley — economics
- Robert Keohane — political science
- Sally Kornbluth — pharmacology
- Paul J. Kramer — biology
- Robert Lefkowitz — biochemistry
- Sarah H. Lisanby — medicine
- David R. Morrison — mathematics
- David G. Schaeffer — mathematics
- Reynolds Price — English literature
- Knut Schmidt-Nielsen — biology
- Joseph J. Spengler — economics
- Lionel Stevenson — English literature
- Steven Vogel — biology
