= NGC 7549 =

Galaxy in the constellation Pegasus

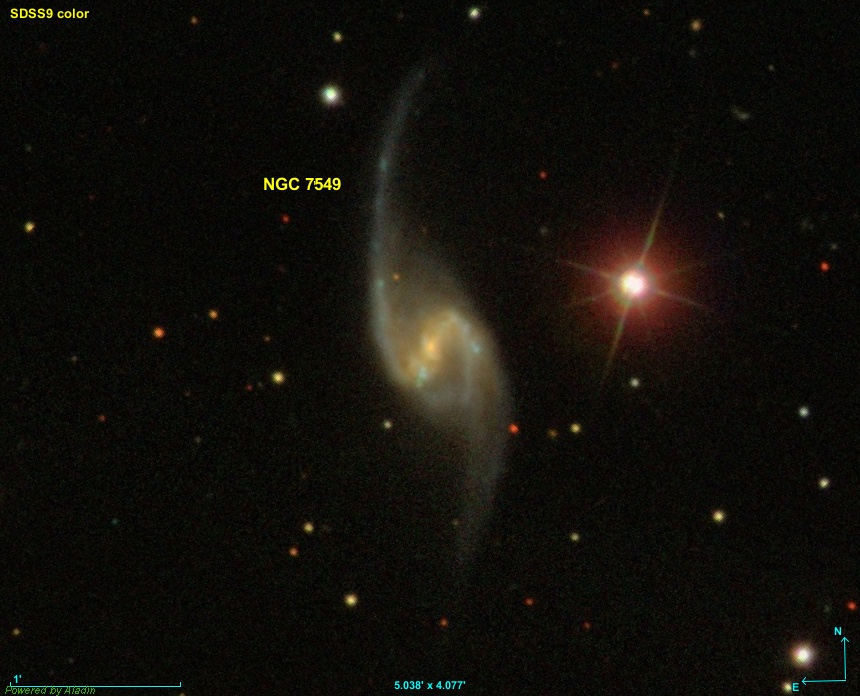
- NGC 7549 imaged by SDSS

Observation data (J2000 epoch)
- Constellation: Pegasus
- Right ascension: 23^{h} 15^{m} 17.2735^{s}
- Declination: +19° 02′ 30.087″
- Redshift: 0.015798±0.00001
- Heliocentric radial velocity: 4,736±3 km/s
- Distance: 187.41 ± 14.74 Mly (57.460 ± 4.518 Mpc)
- Group or cluster: Arp 99, HCG 93
- Apparent magnitude (V): 13.74

Characteristics
- Type: SB(s)cd pec
- Size: ~160,900 ly (49.34 kpc) (estimated)
- Apparent size (V): 2.8′ × 0.7′

Other designations
- HCG 93b, IRAS 23127+1846, Arp 99 NED03, UGC 12457, MCG +03-59-014, PGC 70832, CGCG 454-013

NGC 7549 is a peculiar barred spiral galaxy in the constellation of Pegasus. Its velocity with respect to the cosmic microwave background is 4,373±26 km/s, which corresponds to a Hubble distance of 210.4 ± 14.8 Mly (64.50 ± 4.53 Mpc). However, five non-redshift measurements give a closer mean distance of 187.41 ± 14.74 Mly (57.460 ± 4.518 Mpc). It was discovered by Irish engineer Bindon Stoney on 2 November 1850.

NGC 7549 has an active galactic nucleus, i.e. it has a compact region at the center of a galaxy that emits a significant amount of energy across the electromagnetic spectrum, with characteristics indicating that this luminosity is not produced by the stars.

== Hickson Compact Group 93 ==
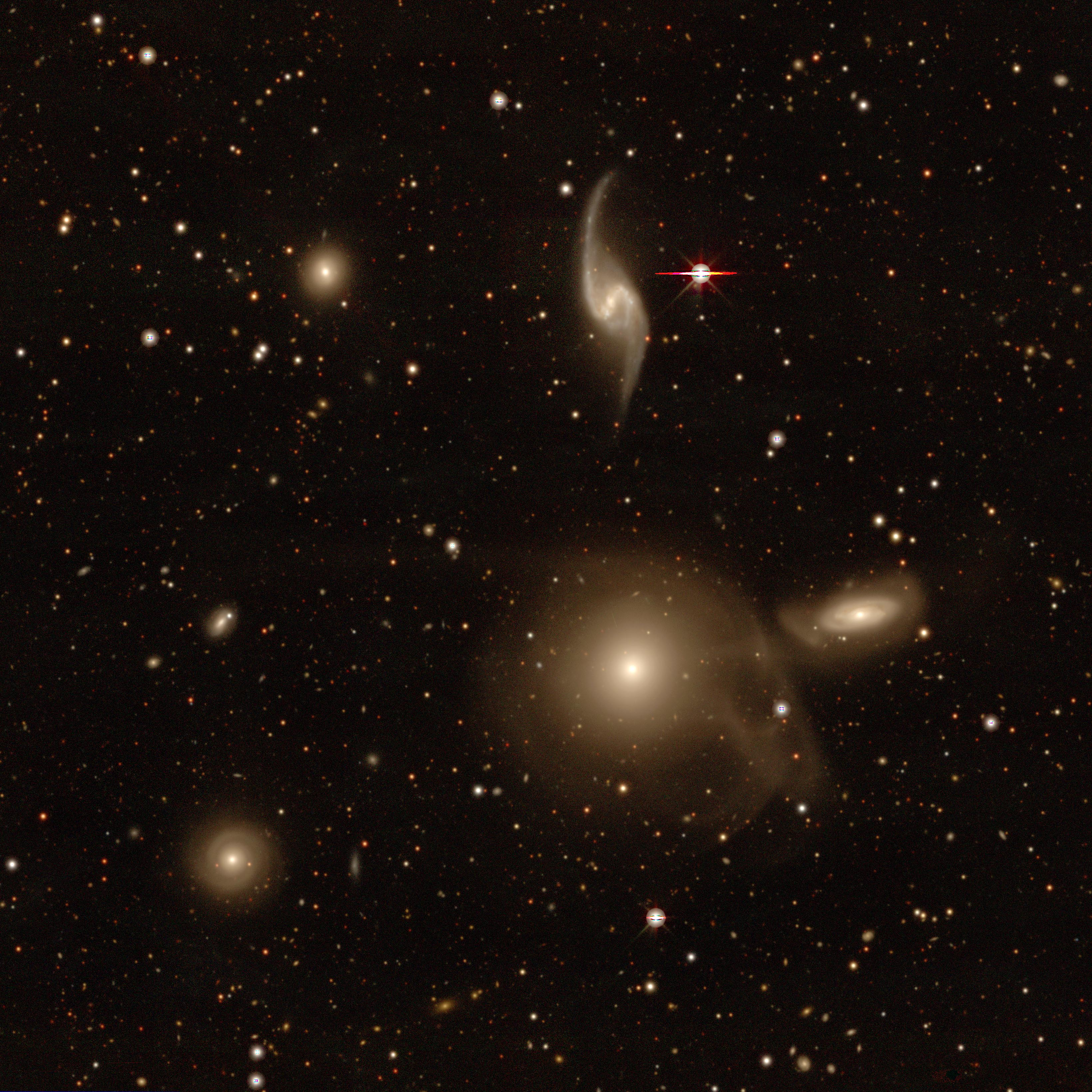
HCG 93 imaged by Legacy Surveys

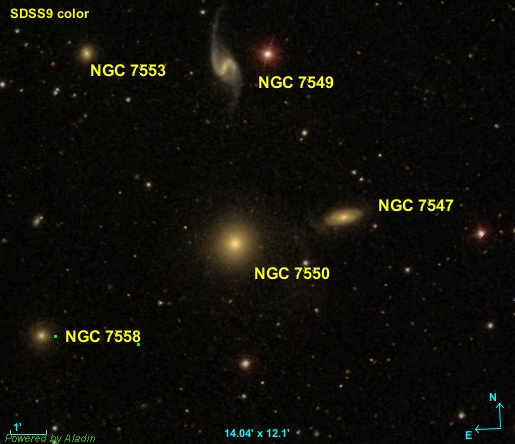
HCG 93 imaged by SDSS

NGC 7549 is a member of the Hickson Compact Group HCG 93. This five member group of galaxies also contains NGC 7547, NGC 7550, NGC 7553, and NGC 7558.

== Arp 99 ==
NGC 7549 along with NGC 7547 and NGC 7550 are listed together as Arp 99 in Halton Arp's Atlas of Peculiar Galaxies as Arp 99, as an example of spirals with companions attached to spiral arms.

== Supernovae ==
Two supernovae have been observed in NGC 7549:

- SN 2009nq (Type Ia, mag. 16.2) was discovered by the Robotic Optical Transient Search Experiment (ROTSE) on 28 December 2009.
- SN 2019fya (Type II, mag. 16.3) was discovered by Kōichi Itagaki on 24 May 2019.

== See also ==
- List of NGC objects (7001–7840)
