= Craufurd Goodwin =

Historian

Craufurd D. W. Goodwin (May 23, 1934 – 2017) was an historian of economic thought and the James B. Duke Professor Emeritus of Economics, Vice-Provost, and Dean of the Graduate School at Duke University. His work for the Ford Foundation is included in the Duke University archives, and the Craufurd D. W. Goodwin Papers (1960–2000) are in the collection of Duke University's David M. Rubenstein Rare Book & Manuscript Library. He was editor of the scholarly journal HOPE (History of Political Economy) and a member of the Center for the Study of Political Economy.

== Academic career ==
He received his B.A. from McGill University (Canada) in 1955 and his Ph.D. from Duke in 1958. He came to Duke as a graduate student and wrote a thesis on Canadian economic policy. He was the editor of the economic journal History of Political Economy and the book series, Historical Perspectives on Modern Economics. He was a visiting professor at Cambridge University and the Australian National University. He was a Guggenheim Fellow and Smuts Fellow, and a past president (1978–79) and distinguished fellow of the History of Economics Society.

== Author of books and articles on economics, history, and art ==
Books written by Goodwin include Economics and National Security: A History of Their Interaction; Missing the Boat: The Failure to Internationalize American Higher Education; Academic Mobility in a Changing World: Regional and Global Trends, which he edited with Alan Smith, Ulrich Teichler. and Peggy Blumenthal); Beyond Government: Extending the Public Policy Debate in Emerging Democracies, edited with Michael Nacht); Talking to Themselves: The Search for Rights and Responsibilities of the Press and Mass Media in Four Latin American Nations (with Michael Nacht); The Academic's Handbook, 2nd Ed. (with Leigh DeNeef); Art and the Market: Roger Fry on Commerce in Art; and Economic Engagements with Art (edited with Neil De Marchi). Goodwin wrote about and taught about the Bloomsbury Group.[6][7] He was co-editor with R. D. Collison Black and A. W. Coats of "The Marginal Revolution in Economics" published in Durham by the Duke University Press.[8] He also wrote about journalist and political commentator Walter Lippmann.[9]

== Biography ==
Craufurd David Wycliffe Goodwin was born May 23, 1934, in Montreal, Quebec, Canada and died April 2017. He was the son of a banker, and his mother was one of the first women to be licensed to practice law in the Canadian Maritimes. He took his first degree at McGill University. In North Carolina he and his wife Nancy Sanders, the daughter of a Duke English professor, owned a showplace home and garden.

Goodwin came to Duke as the student of Joseph Spengler. He completed his studies in 1958, and became the first faculty member appointed in economics at the new York University in Toronto. He returned to Duke in 1962 as an assistant professor. In 2009, along with three other speakers, Roy Weintraub, Kevin Hoover, and Bruce Caldwell, Craufurd Goodwin presented four talks on Keynes in relation to the Bloomsbury Group, for which Goodwin gave the first talk on the subject of "Maynard Keynes of Bloomsbury". The talks were delivered as part of the inaugural event for the Center for the History of Political Economy at Duke University. The series on Keynes was also held in conjunction with Vision and Design: A Year of Bloomsbury, an interdisciplinary program surrounding an exhibition of art by the Bloomsbury group at Duke University's Nasher Museum of Art.

For a time, Goodwin was a program officer in charge of European and international affairs for the Ford Foundation. On the 40th anniversary of HOPE, Kevin D. Hoover wrote "Craufurd Goodwin and History of Political Economy: A Double Anniversary". In 2017 the History of Economics Society named its annual award for Craufurd Goodwin.
