= Warren Samuels =

American economist (1933–2011)

- Born: September 14, 1933; New York City, U.S.
- Died: August 17, 2011 (aged 77); Gainesville, Florida, U.S.
- Known for: History of economic thought, methodology of economics

Academic background
- Education: University of Wisconsin-Madison (PhD)
- Doctoral advisor: Edwin E. Witte
- Influences: John R. Commons, Joseph Spengler

Academic work
- Discipline: Economics, history of economic thought
- Institutions: Michigan State University

Warren Joseph Samuels (September 14, 1933 – August 17, 2011) was an American economist and historian of economic thought. He had a grounding and interest in institutional economics, but did not reject neoclassical economics, and was also interested in the economic methodology. The major part of his academic career was at Michigan State University (1968–1998), where he was appointed professor of economics.

== Early life and education ==
Warren Joseph Samuels was born on September 14, 1933 in the Bronx, New York City, U.S. His father and mother had immigrated from Lithuania and Germany.

He received a BA from University of Miami in 1954, which included a course in institutional economics. He obtained his Ph.D. under Edwin Witte from the University of Wisconsin–Madison in 1957, aged 23, having chosen that establishment (over Harvard and Duke) in order to study study institutionalism among the followers of John R. Commons. His doctoral thesis was titled "The concepts of major business and labour organisations on the role of government in the economy".

== Career ==
After holding academic posts in the University of Missouri, Georgia State University, Atlanta, and University of Miami, Samuels was appointed professor of economics in Michigan State University in 1968, where he stayed until his retirement in 1998. There, he published and edited many works.

He made contributions to the history of economic thought and the methodology of economics, and was an also expert on the role of government in economics. His work was inspired primarily by his "interest in generating greater clarity as to the economic role of government both in the history of economic thought and in contemporary economics". He described himself as "a self-professed institutionalist (in a blend of several other schools)." He developed a Multidisciplinary approach to economics, "drawing on such fields as political science, sociology, philosophy, and law", seeing economics as a "policy science". As well as Commons, Samuels was influenced by the ideas of Joseph Spengler. Former colleague Ross Emmett called Samuels "one of the first historians of economics to treat the history of economics as a branch of intellectual history".

By the late 1960s, institutionalism in economics was declining in popularity, and neoclassical economics was becoming the dominant doctrine, which puzzled Samuels. He developed his interest in methodology mainly in the 1970s.

Among his most influential articles, books, and edited volumes, are: "The Physiocratic Theory of Economic Policy" in The Quarterly Journal of Economics (1962); The Classical Theory of Economic Policy (1966); The Economy as a Process of Valuation (with Steven G. Medema and A. Allan Schmid, 1997); Economics, Governance and Law: Essays on Theory and Policy (2002); and Essays on the History of Economics (with Willie Henderson, Kirk Johnson, and Marianne Johnson (2004).

=== Editing ===
Samuels was the founding editor of the annual research publication Research in the History of Economic Thought and Methodology (RHETM), and longtime editor of its Journal of Economic Issues.

He also edited more than 80 works on the history of economics, economic methodology, and recent economic thought.

=== Other activities ===
Samuels was a founding member of the History of Economics Society and served as its 8th president. He was also a member of several other professional societies.

== Recognition ==
In 1995, Samuels received the Veblen-Commons Award from the Association for Evolutionary Economics.

In 1997 he was awarded Distinguished Fellow by History of Economics Society.

He also received the Distinguished Faculty Award from Michigan State University.

== Personal life, death, and legacy ==
Samuels married Sylvia.

He died on August 17, 2011 at his home in Gainesville, Florida.

Warren and Sylvia Samuels endowed the History of Economics Society to support its program for young scholars, titled the Warren J. and Sylvia J. Samuels Young Scholars Program, or simply Samuels Young Scholars Program. The program, which is "dedicated to maintaining the field of the History of Economics", was established in 2000 by Professor Sandra Peart. It supports and showcases the work of PhD candidates and scholars who have obtained their PhDs within the last two years, and continues as of November 2026.

=== Prizes ===
The Warren Samuels Prize has been awarded by Association for Social Economics since 2008, for the best paper presented at the meetings held in January with the Allied Social Science Associations. The winner receives a stipend of $500.

The Warren Samuels Prize for Interdisciplinary Research in History of Economic Thought and Methodology is awarded by the journal Research in the History of Economic Thought and Methodology, which was founded by Samuels. The prizewinning essay is published in the first issue of each year in the journal. The inaugural prize was awarded in 2016 to Brazilian scholar, Gabriel Oliva, for their essay "The Road to Servomechanisms: The Influence of Cybernetics on Hayek from the Sensory Order to the Social Order". German economist Isabella Weber won the award in 2018.

== Major publications ==
- Erasing the Invisible Hand: Essays on an Elusive and Misused Concept in Economics. Cambridge: Cambridge University Press. 2011. (Note: Brought to completion with the assistance of Marianne Johnson.)
- Essays on the History of Economics (with Willie Henderson, Kirk Johnson, and Marianne Johnson, 2004.
- Warren J. Samuels (January 1, 2002). Economics, Governance and Law: Essays on Theory and Policy. Elgar. ISBN 978-1-84064-856-0.
- The Economy as a Process of Valuation (with Steven G. Medema and A. Allan Schmid), 1997.
- Economic Thought and Discourse in the Twentieth Century (with Jeff Biddle and Thomas Patchak-Schuster), 1993.
- Gardiner C. Means: Institutionalist and Post-Keynesian (with Steven G. Medema), 1990.
- Pareto on Policy, 1974.
- The Classical Theory of Economic Policy, 1966.

== External reference ==
- Warren J. Samuels' Homepage at Michigan State University
- "Warren Samuels". EconPapers.
- "Warren Samuels". JSTOR.
