= GRB 990123 =

Gamma-ray burst

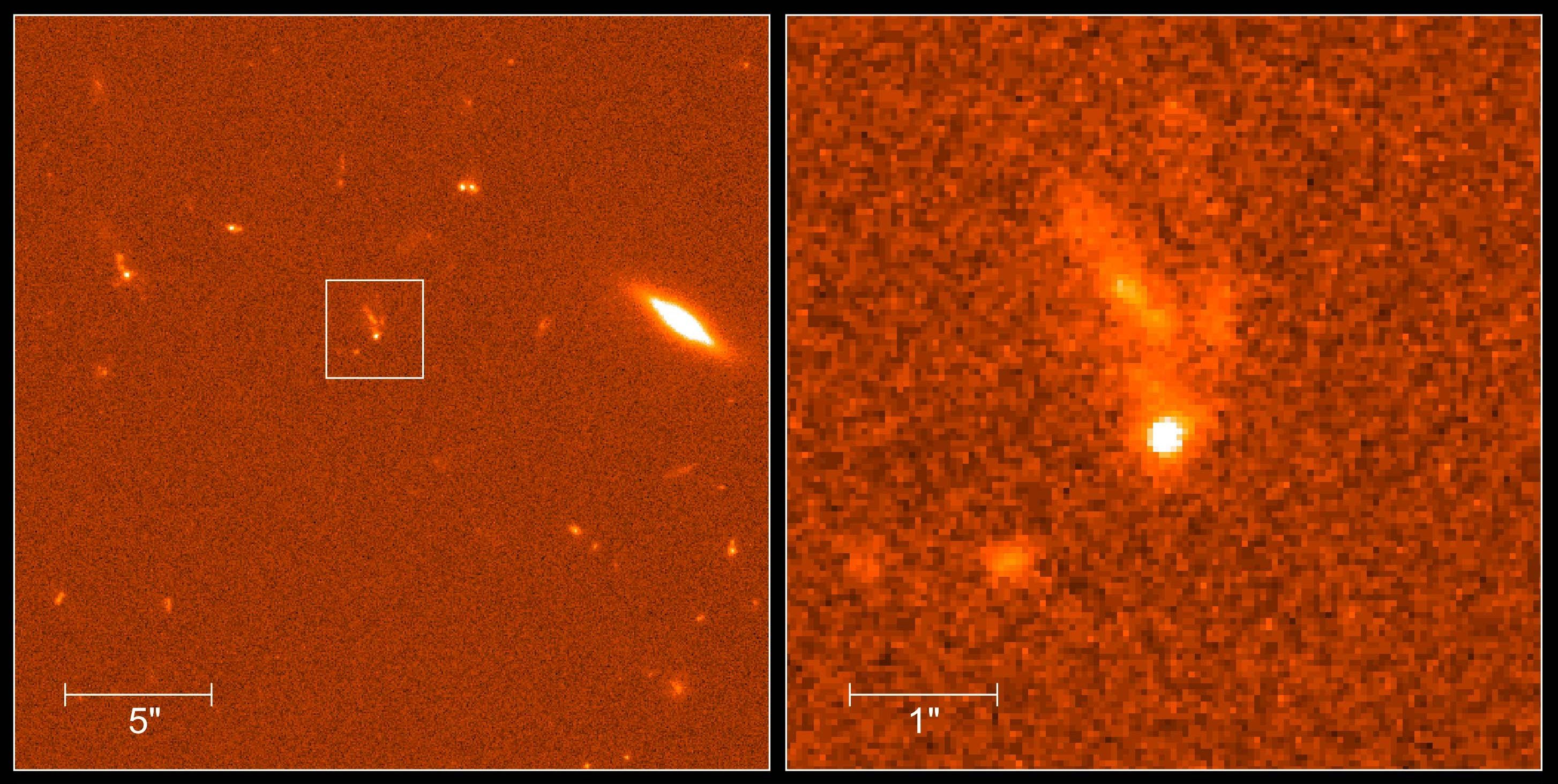
- Optical afterglow of gamma-ray burst GRB 990123 (the bright dot within the white square and in the enlarged cutout) on January 23, 1999. The object above it with the finger-like filaments is its originating galaxy. This galaxy seems to be distorted by a collision with another galaxy.
- Event type: Gamma-ray burst
- Date: 23 January 1999
- Instrument: BeppoSAX
- Constellation: Boötes
- Right ascension: 15^{h} 25^{m} 29.0^{s}
- Declination: +44° 45′ 30″
- Distance: 9,000,000,000 ly (2.8×10^{9} pc)
- Redshift: 1.6004
- Peak apparent magnitude: 20.6R
- Other designations: GRB 990123, SAX J1525.5+4446, Trigger 7343, XRF 990123, [STK2001] 11201d, AAVSO 1522+45
- Related media on Commons

GRB 990123 is a gamma-ray burst which was detected on January 23, 1999. It was the first GRB for which a simultaneous optical flash was detected. Astronomers first managed to obtain a visible-light image of a GRB as it occurred on January 23, 1999, using the ROTSE-I telescope in Los Alamos, New Mexico. The ROTSE-I was operated by a team under Dr. Carl W. Akerlof of the University of Michigan and included members from Los Alamos National Laboratory and Lawrence Livermore National Laboratory. The robotic telescope was fully automated, responding to signals from NASA's BATSE instrument aboard the Compton Gamma Ray Observatory within seconds, without human intervention. In the dark hours of the morning of January 23, 1999, the Compton satellite recorded a gamma-ray burst that lasted for about a minute and a half. There was a peak of gamma and X-ray emission 25 seconds after the event was first detected, followed by a somewhat smaller peak 40 seconds after the beginning of the event. The emission then fizzled out in a series of small peaks over the next 50 seconds, and eight minutes after the event had faded to a hundredth of its maximum brightness. The burst was so strong that it ranked in the top 2% of all bursts detected.

Compton reported the burst to its ground control facility at NASA Goddard Space Flight Center in Maryland the moment it began, and Goddard immediately sent the data out over the "gamma-ray Burst Coordinates Network (GCN)". While Compton, as mentioned, could not provide precise locations of bursts, the location was good enough for the wide-field ROTSE-I. The camera array automatically focused on the region of the sky and obtained an image of the burst 22 seconds after it was detected by Compton, with subsequent images obtained every 25 seconds after that.

ROTSE-I could image cosmic objects as faint as magnitude 16, and GRB hunters had expected the visible component of a GRB to be very faint. Instead, the visible component reached magnitude 9. It was so bright that it could have been seen by an amateur astronomer with good binoculars. The object that produced it increased in brightness by a factor of 4,000 in less than a minute.

Because ROTSE-I operated automatically (while its creators slept) the news of ROTSE-I's accomplishment didn't make it out on the networks until later in the day, and in the meantime other observatories were focusing on the event, by then designated "GRB 990123".

The BeppoSAX satellite had also seen the burst, and pinned down its location to within a few arcminutes. This data was sent out, and four hours after the burst the area was imaged with the 1.52 meter (60 inch) Schmidt camera at Palomar Mountain in California. The image revealed a magnitude 18 optical transient that wasn't on archive images of the same area.

The next night, the fading object, by now down to magnitude 20, was imaged by the Keck telescope, and the 2.6 meter Nordic Optical Telescope in the Canary Islands. The observations revealed absorption lines with a redshift of 1.6, implying a distance of 9 billion light-years.

The Hubble Space Telescope performed observations on the location of GRB 990123, sixteen days after the event. It had faded by more than a factor of three million in that time. The Hubble was able to pick up the traces of a faint galaxy, whose blue color suggested it was forming new stars at a rapid rate.

== See also ==
- GRB 050509B
