= NGC 7550 =

Lenticular Galaxy in the constellation Pegasus

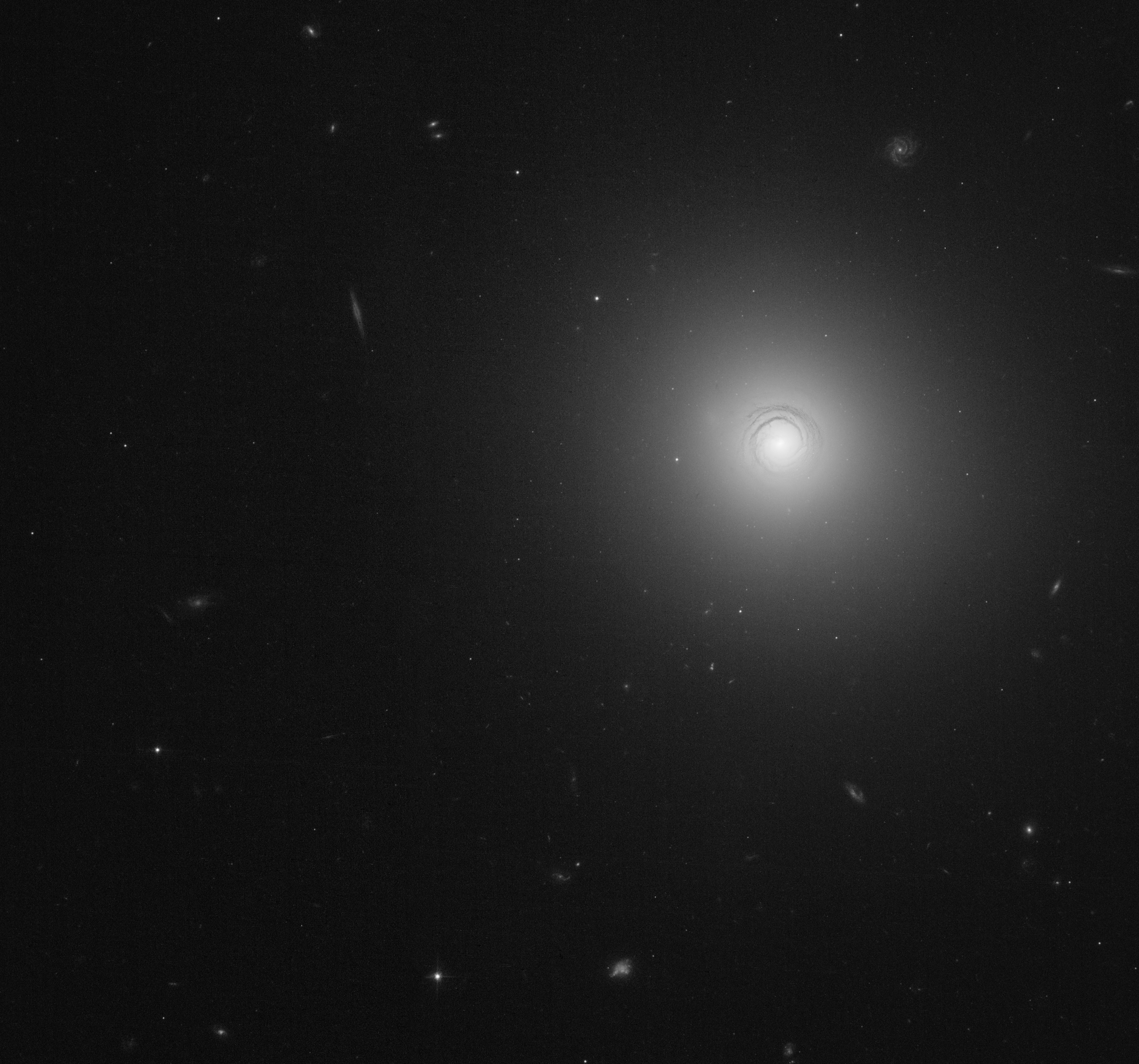
- Image of NGC 7550

Observation data (J2000 epoch)
- Constellation: Pegasus
- Right ascension: 23^{h} 15^{m} 16.0800^{s}
- Declination: +18° 57′ 41.040″
- Distance: 221 Mly

Characteristics
- Type: SA0^-

Other designations
- NGC 7550, UGC 12456, Arp 99 NED02, CGCG 454-012, CGCG 2312.8+1841

NGC 7550 is an lenticular galaxy located in the constellation Pegasus. Its velocity relative to the cosmic microwave background is 4,598 ± 29 km/s, which corresponds to a Hubble distance of 67.8 ± 4.8 Mpc (~221 million light-years). It was discovered by the German-British astronomer William Herschel in 1784.

== Observations ==
NGC 7550 forms a triplet of galaxies in gravitational interaction with its neighbors NGC 7547 and NGC 7549, a triplet that appears in Halton Arp 's Atlas of peculiar galaxies under the designation Arp 99. According to Professor Seligman, NGC 7547 is not part of the Arp atlas and is confused with NGC 7549, but it is undoubtedly part of the triplet with NGC 7550, the brightest of the three galaxies. The distance to these three galaxies is approximately the same. The other two galaxies are NGC 7547 and NGC 7549. The Hubble distances of these three galaxies are approximately the same and are respectively equal to 65.0 ± 4.6 Mpc (~212 million ly), 67.8 ± 4.8 Mpc (~221 million ly) and 64.5 ± 4.5 Mpc (~210 million ly).

=== NGC 7550 Group ===
NGC 7550 is part of a triplet of galaxies, the NGC 7550 group, the brightest of the three galaxies. The distance to these three galaxies is approximately the same. These three galaxies are NGC 7547, NGC 75 and NGC 7549, whose Hubble distances are respectively.

The NGC 7550 group is also designated by the NASA/IPAC database as WBL 700, named after the authors who published an article in 1999. Unfortunately, the designations of the galaxies are not given in this article, but it is undoubtedly NGC 7553 whose Hubble distance of 70.95 ± 5.03 Mpc (~231 million ly) is comparable to that of the galaxies in the triplet. NGC 7558, a member of the Hickson 93, is a relatively distant galaxy at 124.54 ± 8.75 Mpc (~406 million ly).

=== Hickson 93 Compact Group ===
NGC 7550 is a member of the Hickson Compact Group HCG 93. This group of galaxies has a total of five galaxies: HGC 93A (NGC 7550), HGC 93B (NGC 7549), HGC 93C (NGC 7547), HGC 93D (NGC 7553) and HGC 93E (NGC 7558).

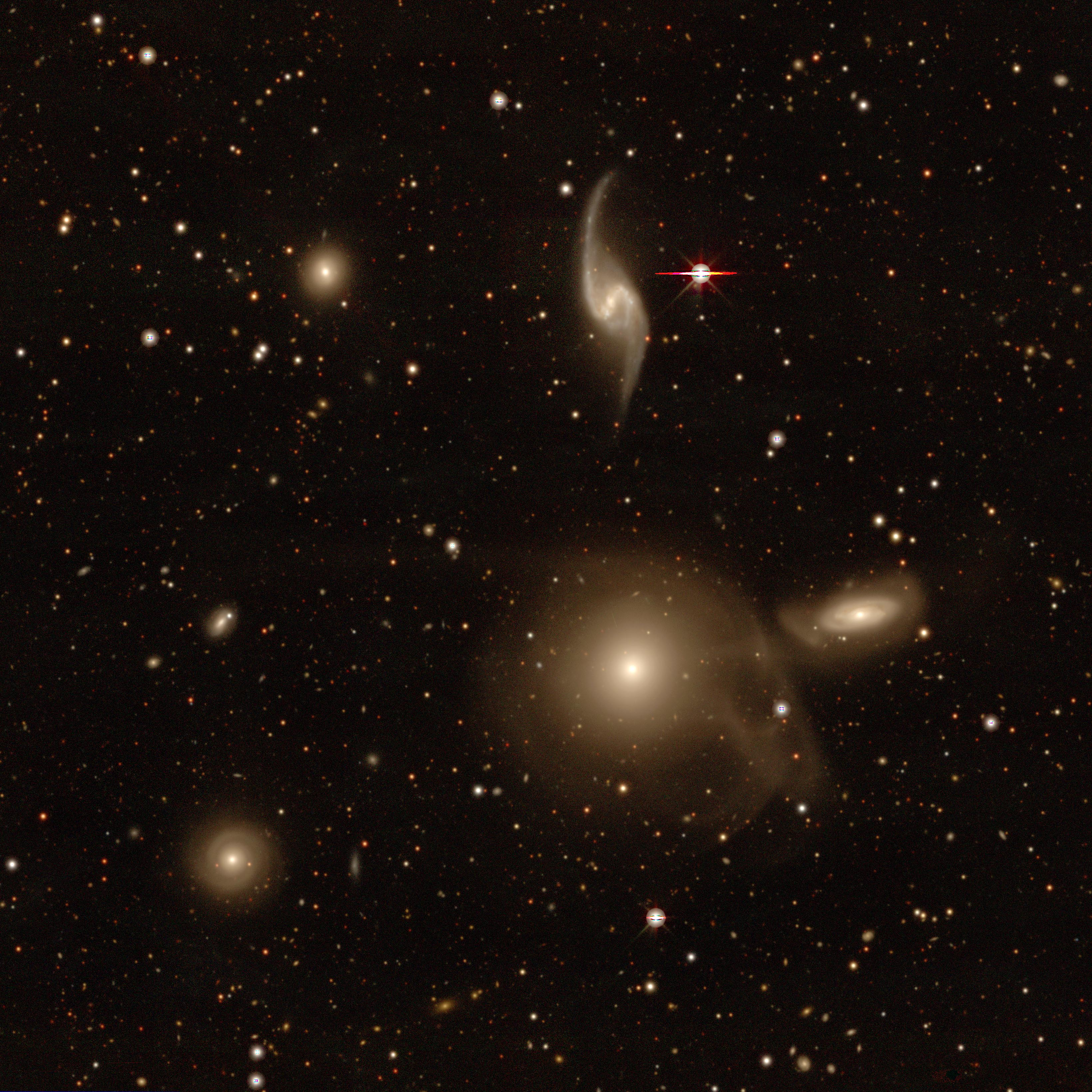
HCG 93 Compact Group as seen by DESI Legacy Survey
