= Economics of networks =

Economics of networks is a discipline in the fields of economics and network sciences. It is primarily concerned with the understanding of economic phenomena by using network concepts and the tools of network science. Prominent authors in the field include Sanjeev Goyal, Matthew O. Jackson, and Rachel Kranton.

This term should not be confused with network economics or network externality.

== Models of networked markets ==
The concept of networks enables a better understanding of the functioning of markets. On the border of network science and market theory, several models have emerged to explain different aspects in markets.

=== Exchange theory ===
Exchange theory explains how economic transactions, trade in favor, communication of information, or other exchanges are affected by the structure of the relationships among the involved participants. The main idea is that the act of exchange is influenced by the agents’ opportunities and their environment. For example, the position of a given agent in the network can endorse them with the power in the auctions and deals they make with their partners.

=== Bilateral Trading Models ===
As part of exchange theory, bilateral trading models consider sellers and buyers. These models use game-theoretic models of bargaining in networks to help predict the behavior of agents depending on the type of network. The outcome of transactions can be determined by, for instance, the number of sellers a buyer is connected to, or vice versa (Corominas-Bosch model). Another case occurs when the agents agree on a transaction through an auction and their decision-making during the auction depends on the link structure. Kranton and Minehart concluded that if markets were considered networks, it would enable sellers to pool uncertainty in demand. Building links is costly, however, due to trade-offs not all links are necessary for the network, resulting in a sparse, efficiency-enhancing network.

=== Informal exchange ===
The study of networks in economics started before the development of network science. Károly Polány, Claude Lévi-Strauss, and Bronislaw Malinowski studied tribes where complicated gift exchange mechanisms constructed networks between groups, such as families or islands. Although modern trade systems differ fundamentally, such systems based on reciprocity can still survive and reciprocity-based or personalized exchange deals persist even when a market would be more efficient. According to Kranton, informal exchange can exist in networks if transactions are more reciprocal than market-based. In this case, market exchange is hard to find and is associated with high search costs, therefore yielding low utility. Personalized exchange agreements ensure the possibility of long-term agreements.

== Scale-free property and economics ==
Recent studies have tried to examine the deeper connection between socio-economic factors and phenomena and the scale-free property. They found that business networks have scale-free property and that the merger among companies decreases the average separation between firms and increases cliquishness. In another research paper, scientists found that payment flows in an online payment system exhibit free-scale property, high clustering coefficient, and small world phenomenon and that after the September 11 attacks the connectivity of the network reduced and average path length increased. These results were found to be useful in order to understand how to overcome a possible contagion of similar disturbances in payment networks.

== World trade web ==
World trade is generally highlighted as a typical example of large networks. The interconnectedness of the countries can have both positive and negative externalities. It has been shown that the world trade web exhibits scale-free properties, where the main hub is the United States. Eighteen out of the twenty-one developed countries that were analyzed showed synchronization in economic performance and cycles with the US during 1975-2000. The remaining three countries are exceptions. Austria’s performance correlates highly with that of Germany, while Germany and Japan took differing economic paths after World War II as a result of their unique situations. Despite the embeddedness in the global economy that Germany and Japan experienced, the unusual economic measures following Germany’s unification in 1992 and the Plaza Accord in 1985 (which appreciated the Japanese Yen), resulted in a different economic trajectory compared to the majority of developed countries. The importance of regional economic and political cooperation is also highlighted in the analysis.

== See also ==
- Critical mass (Sociodynamics)
- Critical Mass (Book)
- Network effect

== Literature ==
- David Easley and Jon Kleinberg (2010). Networks, Crowds, and Markets:Reasoning About a Highly Connected World. Cambridge University Press. ISBN 9780521195331.
- Philip Ball (2006-05-16). Critical Mass. Macmillan. ISBN 9780374530419.
