= Timothy A. McKay =

American astrophysicist

Timothy A. McKay is an astrophysicist and the Arthur F. Thurnau Professor of Physics at the University of Michigan. He is actively involved in physics education, including courses on “Physics for the Life Sciences” and Saturday Morning Physics. As of 2013, McKay's papers have over 30,000 citations and an h-index of 66. He considers publication and education vital to the scientific enterprise: “science isn’t science until you’ve shared it with someone else.”

== Early career ==
Timothy McKay and his older brother were the first in their family to attend higher education; Timothy enrolled in physics primarily because his brother had done the same. McKay earned his BS summa cum laude in 1986 at Temple University in Philadelphia, and then his PhD in 1992 at the University of Chicago. From 1992 to 1995, he was a Leon Lederman Fellow at Fermilab; he was then hired to the faculty of the University of Michigan, where he became Associate Chair for the undergraduate physics program in 2004 and then also Arthur F. Thurnau Professor in 2005. In 2008 he became Director of the LSA Honors Program for eight years, finishing his term in 2016. Since 2008, he has also been president of the UM Chapter of Phi Beta Kappa.

McKay is passionate about undergraduate research, and is well known for his mentorship of students; he credits his own research experiences as an undergraduate with much of his success.

== Recent work ==
Since 2003, Tim McKay has worked on the Robotic Optical Transient Search Experiment (ROTSE) with Carl Akerlof, a collaboration between Los Alamos National Laboratory, Lawrence Livermore National Laboratory, and the University of Michigan which operates automated telescopes in the US, Namibia, Turkey, and Australia to provide full-sky optical coverage of gamma ray bursts. "He was a builder on the Sloan Digital Sky Survey project, and has worked on it since 1992. His group did the first weak lensing measurements in the SDSS and later built the largest galaxy cluster catalogs derived from it. He has also worked on the Supernova/Acceleration Probe, which is tracking type Ia supernovas to better understand dark energy. His most recent astrophysics project is the Dark Energy Survey."

McKay is also passionate about amateur science; he stresses important contributions that amateurs have made to the scientific enterprise, and even considers himself a professional in a few fields and an amateur in many. McKay believes that science is not just about uncovering new knowledge for experts, but also about spreading that knowledge to as many people as possible.

McKay is developing a new education software called E^{2}Coach that uses research analytics to develop customized curriculum and study strategies for each student. The system uses the Michigan Tailoring System, originally developed for the Center for Health Communications Research, and is designed to benefit all students, whether average students hoping to do better, students at risk of failure, or gifted students seeking more challenging material. It has been pilot-tested in four introductory physics courses so far. This project was funded by a grant from the Next Generation Learning Challenge, funded by the Gates Foundation and Hewlett Foundation.

== Recognition ==
McKay was named a Fellow of the American Physical Society in 2023, "for tireless efforts to catalyze systemic change and make STEM learning environments equitable and inclusive, as well as the use of data and technology to inform and improve STEM learning".
