= Steven G. Medema =

American economics scholar

Steven G. Medema is an American scholar of economics and the George Family Research Professor in the Department of Economics at Duke University. He is also the associate director of the university's Center for the History of Political Economy, and a research associate in the Duke School of Law.

In 1989, he received his Ph.D. in economics from Michigan State University. He was previously a professor of economics at University of Colorado, Denver. He is also a former president of the History of Economics Society and editor of the Journal of the History of Economic Thought. He is currently the general editor of Oxford Studies in the History of Economics, and is on the editorial of multiple journals on the history of economics, including the History of Political Economy.

Medema is known for his work on the history of economics, especially the history of Coase theorem. His scholarly articles have appeared in the Journal of Economic Literature, Journal of Economic Perspectives, History of Political Economy, and Law and Economics. Medema has written and edited numerous books, including The Hesitant Hand: Taming Self-Interest in the History of Economic Ideas, published by Princeton University Press in 2010. The Hesitant Hand won the Best Monograph Award from the European Society for the History of Economic Thought.
