= Timothy McKay =

Timothy McKay may refer to:

- Timothy A. McKay, astrophysicist
- Timothy McKay (American football) (born 2002), American football player
