= Identity economics =

Influence of identity on economic decisions

Identity economics captures the idea that people make economic choices based on both monetary incentives and their identity: holding monetary incentives constant, people avoid actions that conflict with their concept of self. The fundamentals of identity economics was first formulated by Nobel Prize–winning economist George Akerlof and Rachel Kranton in their article "Economics and Identity," published in the Quarterly Journal of Economics.

This article provides a framework for incorporating social identities into standard economics models, expanding the standard utility function to include both pecuniary payoffs and identity utility. The authors demonstrate the importance of identity in economics by showing how predictions of the classic principal-agent problem change when the identity of the agent is considered.

== Research ==
Akerlof and Kranton provide an overview of their work in the book "Identity Economics," published in 2010. In the book, they provide a layman's approach to Identity Economics and apply the concept to workplace organization, gender roles, and educational choice, summarizing several previous papers on the applications of Identity Economics.

While this macro-economic theory deals exclusively with already well established categories of social identity, Laszlo Garai when applied the concept of social identity in economic psychology takes into consideration identities in statu nascendi (i.e. in the course of being formed and developed). This theory that is referred to the macro-processes based on a "large-scale production" later gets applied to the individual creativity's psychology: Garai derived it from the principal's and, resp., agent's "identity elaboration". A further special feature of Garai's theory on social identity is that it resolved the contradiction between the inter-individual phenomena studied by the social identity theories and the intra-individual mechanisms studied by the brain theories: L. Garai presented a theory on an inter-individual mechanism acting in the world of social identity. The theory that was referred in the beginning to the macro-processes based on a large-scale production later has been applied by Garai to the micro-processes of individual creativity.

Following papers have used social identity to examine a variety of subjects within economics. Moses Shayo uses the concept of social identity to explain why countries with similar economic characteristics might choose substantially different levels of redistribution. The paper won the 2009 Michael Wallerstein Award, given to the best article published in the area of political economy. Daniel Benjamin, James Choi, and Joshua Strickland examine the effect of social identity, focusing on ethnic identity, on a wide range of economic behavior. For a review of papers that study economics and identity, see articles by Claire Hill (2007) and John Davis (2004).
