= David G. Schaeffer =

American mathematician (1942–2026)

- Born: David George Schaeffer; October 6, 1942; Cincinnati, Ohio, U.S.
- Died: March 20, 2026 (aged 83); Chapel Hill, North Carolina, U.S.
- Education: University of Illinois Urbana-Champaign; Massachusetts Institute of Technology
- Occupation: Mathematician
- Spouse: Jennie Mae Guffey (m. 1982, divorced)

David George Schaeffer (October 6, 1942 – March 20, 2026) was an American mathematician.

== Early life and career ==
Schaeffer was born in Cincinnati, Ohio, on October 6, 1942, the son of John Schaeffer and Gertrude Berdard. He attended the University of Illinois Urbana-Champaign, earning his BS degree in 1963. He also attended the Massachusetts Institute of Technology, earning his PhD degree in mathematics in 1968.

Schaeffer served as a professor in the department of mathematics at the Massachusetts Institute of Technology from 1970 to 1978. He then served as a professor in the same department at Duke University from 1978 to 2012. During his years as a professor, in 1990, he was named the James B. Duke Distinguished Professor of Mathematics.

== Personal life and death ==
In 1982, Schaeffer married Jennie Mae Guffey. Their marriage ended in divorce.

Schaeffer died of a brain tumor at the Carol Woods Retirement Community in Chapel Hill, North Carolina, on March 20, 2026, at the age of 83.
