= Blanche Capel =

American biologist

- Occupations: Biologist, Professor

Academic background
- Education: BA, PhD
- Alma mater: Hollins College; Haverford College; University of Pennsylvania

Academic work
- Institutions: Duke University

Blanche Capel is an American biologist and James B. Duke Professor of Cell Biology at Duke University. Her research focuses on vertebrate sex determination.

== Education ==
After graduating with a BA in Literature and Art History from Hollins College, Capel married and focused on raising her children. She became interested in further study by the time her children reached school age and took various undergraduate classes at Haverford and Bryn Mawr College.

I remember a day when I had brought a batch of brownies to a fund-raising bake sale, and one of the organizers was giving me detailed instructions on how to cut the brownies. I think that was the moment when I decided I needed to do something else with my time, and soon after, enrolled in a course on molecular genetics offered at Bryn Mawr College.

— An interview with Dr Blanche Capel

Following two years in Haverford's molecular biology program, she started to work towards a PhD in genetics at the laboratory of Beatrice Mintz at the Fox Chase Cancer Center. She was awarded her PhD by the University of Pennsylvania in 1989.

== Career ==
Capel's first academic position was as a postdoc at the National Institute for Medical Research in the lab of Robin Lovell-Badge. She left for an assistant professorship at Duke University in 1993 and was made full professor in 2005.

She has been an editor of a range of journals related to her research, such as Science and Developmental Biology. She was president of the publisher of Developmental Biology, the Society for Developmental Biology, in 2017.

The American Association for the Advancement of Science elected her fellow in 2010, the American Academy of Arts and Sciences followed suit in 2020.

In 2025, Capel was awarded the Edwin G. Conklin Medal from the Society for Developmental Biology, which recognises extraordinary research contributions and mentorship in developmental biology in the USA.
