= Mauro Boianovsky =

Brazilian Economics Professor

- Born: April 12, 1959; Porto Alegre
- Died: February 21, 2024 (aged 64); Brasília
- Education: University of Cambridge
- Employer: University of Brasília

Mauro Boianovsky (April 12,1959 – February 21,2024) was a Brazilian economics professor at the University of Brasília and former president of the History of Economics Society. His publications focused on the history of macroeconomics and development economics.

== Academic Career ==
Boianovsky earned his economics degree from the University of Brasília in 1979 and began teaching as an assistant professor in the Universidade Federal Fluminense in 1984 whilst studying for his masters degree in the Pontifícia Universidade Católica do Rio de Janeiro. Boianovky later conducted his doctoral research on Knut Wicksell in the University of Cambridge.

After earning his doctorate, Boianovsky started teaching at the University of Brasília, where he would remain until his passing. He was elected the president of the History of Economics Society for the 2016 term, being the first Latin American occupy the presidential chair of the organization.

== Later Life ==
Boianovsky was diagnosed and later passed from kidney cancer. For his contributions to the institution, he was awarded the professor emeritus title by the University of Brasília posthumously.
