= Carl W. Akerlof =

American physicist (born 1938)

Carl William Akerlof
- Born: March 5, 1938 (age 88); New Haven, Connecticut, United States
- Education: Yale University (BS); Cornell University (PhD)
- Known for: Robotic Optical Transient Search Experiment (ROTSE); research on gamma-ray bursts and optical transients
- Awards: Fellow of the American Physical Society (1993)
- Scientific career
- Fields: Particle physics, astrophysics
- Workplaces: University of Michigan

Carl William Akerlof (born March 5, 1938) is an American particle physicist and astrophysicist. A professor of physics at the University of Michigan, Akerlof initiated and led the Robotic Optical Transient Search Experiment (ROTSE), a ground-breaking effort to find fast astrophysical optical transients, particularly gamma-ray bursts. Akerlof has co-authored over 400 papers with 1500 collaborators, which have been cited over 6000 times. He was elected in 1993 a fellow of the American Physical Society (APS).

== Early life and education ==
Akerlof was born in New Haven, Connecticut, on March 5, 1938. His mother was Rosalie Clara Grubber (née Hirschfelder), a housewife of German Jewish descent, and his father was Gösta Carl Åkerlöf, a chemist and inventor, who was a Swedish immigrant. Both his father and his uncle were physical chemists who worked on the Manhattan Project during World War II. His brother, George, is a 2001 Nobel Memorial Prize in Economic Sciences laureate.

Akerlof earned his bachelor's in physics from Yale University in 1960, and earned his PhD from Cornell University 1967. He joined the faculty of the University of Michigan in 1969, where he has remained ever since.

== Change to astrophysics ==
Akerlof initially studied the strong and electromagnetic interactions of elementary particles in a number of experiments at the Cornell electron synchrotron, Argonne National Laboratory, Fermilab and the Stanford Linear Accelerator. His interests began to shift to astrophysics in 1980 with the exploration of how high energy particle physics techniques could be applied to astrophysics. The first effort along these lines showed that despite the wishful thinking of a number of physicists, magnetic monopoles could not be detected by the acoustic waves that would be generated in electrical conductors. In 1986, he started to look for TeV gamma-ray radiation of cosmic origin using a pair of solar concentrators at Sandia National Laboratory as light collectors. This work morphed into collaboration with a group at Mt. Hopkins, Arizona directed by Trevor Weekes that led to the unexpected discovery of such radiation from Active Galactic Nuclei at cosmological distances. A few years later, fascinated by the mystery of bright cosmic explosions called gamma-ray bursts, he began a series of experiments in 1992 to find prompt optical traces of these violent events, culminating in a successful optical observation on January 23, 1999.

== International collaboration ==
Akerlof has worked to foster international collaboration, including a 1974 sabbatical in the Soviet Union to work on an experiment at the 70 GeV particle accelerator at Serpukov. The trip produced little science but provided significant insights regarding the organizational difficulties faced by Russian physicists in the waning decade of the Soviet system.

With the goal of encouraging other nations to find effective paths to interesting and affordable astrophysics research, he has visited a number of countries including China, Iran, South Africa and Thailand. His most significant contribution in this area is the ROTSE Collaboration which has built and operated four robotic optical telescopes on four continents in Australia, the United States, Namibia and Turkey. This project has been running for about a decade and has successfully observed and detected gamma-ray bursts and supernovae. A former University of Michigan student, Wiphu Rujopakorn, has taken advantage of the ROTSE imaging data for instructing school children in Thailand about the mysteries of astronomy.

== Significant discoveries ==
Akerlof is best known for his work in establishing the feasibility of real time searches for optical transients and the subsequent observations of a large number of gamma-ray bursts and supernovae. He was also a participant in the discovery of TeV gamma-rays from the type of Active Galactic Nuclei known as “blazars”. NASA considered his discovery of optical radiation from GRB990123 one of the top ten discoveries of that year. His earlier work in particle physics has been widely cited. Most recently, his teaching activities have led him to introduce a number of astrophysics experiments into the undergraduate lab curriculum.

== See also ==
- Particle physics

== Official ==
- Carl Akerlof at University of Michigan
