= Garnett H. Kelsoe =

American immunologist

Academic background
- Education: Southern Methodist University, Harvard University
- Thesis: Mechanisms of the Humoral Immune Response. Experimental and Applied Studies (1979)

Garnett Herrel Kelsoe is an American immunologist and the James B. Duke Professor of Immunology at Duke University School of Medicine.

== Education and career ==
Kelsoe completed his B.S and M.S. in 1974 from Southern Methodist University with a research focus on parasitology and development spermatogenesis in Hymenolepis diminuta, a rat tapeworm. He then went on to Harvard University where he studied basic and applied immunology and completed his Doctor of Science degree in 1979 with a thesis titled "Mechanisms of the Humoral Immune Response. Experimental and Applied Studies." From 1979 to 1982, Kelsoe was a postdoctoral fellow in the laboratory of Klaus Rajewsky at the University of Cologne. In 1982, Kelsoe returned to the United States and joined the faculty at the University of Texas Medical Branch as an assistant professor in the Department of Microbiology, rising to the rank of associate professor in 1988. In 1989, Kelsoe moved to the University of Maryland School of Medicine as an associate professor in the Department of Microbiology & Immunology. He was promoted to full professor in 1994. In 1998, Kelsoe moved to Duke University School of Medicine, where he is currently the James B. Duke Professor of Immunology. He is a member of Duke Cancer Institute and Duke Human Vaccine Institute. He was Deputy Editor of the Journal of Clinical Investigation from 2012 to 2017 and of the Journal of Immunology from 1997-2002.

== Research ==
Kelsoe's research focuses on humoral immunity, B lymphocyte development and activation, and the mechanism by which lymphocytes specific to certain pathogens get selected. Kelsoe and his collaborators have made a number of contributions to understanding the germinal center response, a transient cellular complex that supports rapid mutation in genes encoding the active B-cell antigen receptor. This rapid mutation (hypermutation) is coupled with selection for mutated germinal center B cells that express higher affinity antigen receptors, a kind of somatic Darwinian evolution that improves protective antibody responses to pathogens. His group focuses in particular on immune responses to HIV and Influenza viruses.

== Notable publications ==
- Han S, Hathcock K... Kelsoe G (1995). Cellular interaction in germinal centers: Roles of CD40 ligand and B7-2 in established germinal centers. Journal of Immunology. 155(2): pgs. 556-567
- Takahashi Y, Dutta PR... Kelsoe G (1998). In situ studies of the primary immune response to (4-hydroxy-3-nitrophenyl)acetyl. V. Affinity maturation develops in two stages of clonal selection. Journal of Experimental Medicine. 187(6): pgs. 885-895
- Han S, Dillon SR... Kelsoe G (1997). V(D)J recombinase activity in a subset of germinal center B lymphocytes. Science. 278(5336): pgs. 301-305
- Jacob J, Przylepa J... Kelsoe G (1993). In situ studies of the primary immune response to (4-hydroxy-3-nitrophenyl)acetyl. hi. the kinetics of v region mutation and selection in germinal center B cells. Journal of Experimental Medicine. 178(4): pgs. 1293-1307
- Jacob J, Kelsoe G (1992). In situ studies of the primary immune response to (4-hydroxy-3-nitrophyl)acetyl. II. A common clonal origin for periarteriolar lymphoid sheath-associated foci and germinal centers. Journal of Experimental Medicine. 176(3): pgs. 679-687
- Jacob J, Kassir R, Kelsoe G (1991). In situ studies of the primary immune response to (4-hydroxy-3-nitrophenyl)acetyl. I. The architecture and dynamics of responding cell populations. Journal of Experimental Medicine. 173(5): pgs. 1165-1175
