= George Akerlof =

American economist (born 1940)

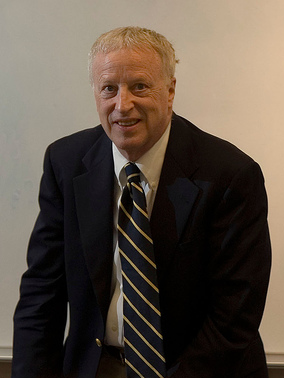
- Akerlof in 2007
- Born: George Arthur Akerlof; June 17, 1940 (age 86); New Haven, Connecticut, U.S.
- Spouses: Kay Leong (m. 1974; div. 1977); Janet Yellen (m. 1978)
- Children: 1
- Relatives: Carl W. Akerlof (brother)

Academic background
- Education: Yale University (BA); Massachusetts Institute of Technology (PhD)
- Thesis: Wages and capital (1966)
- Doctoral advisor: Robert Solow
- Influences: John Maynard Keynes

Academic work
- School or tradition: New Keynesian economics
- Institutions: Georgetown University; London School of Economics; University of California, Berkeley
- Doctoral students: Charles Engel; Adriana Kugler
- Notable ideas: Information asymmetry Efficiency wages
- Awards: Nobel Memorial Prize in Economic Sciences (2001)
- Website: Information at IDEAS / RePEc

George Arthur Akerlof (born June 17, 1940) is an American economist and a university professor at the McCourt School of Public Policy at Georgetown University and Koshland Professor of Economics Emeritus at the University of California, Berkeley. Akerlof was awarded the 2001 Nobel Memorial Prize in Economic Sciences, jointly with Michael Spence and Joseph Stiglitz, "for their analyses of markets with asymmetric information." He is the husband of former United States Secretary of the Treasury Janet Yellen.

== Early life and education ==
Akerlof was born in New Haven, Connecticut, on June 17, 1940. His mother was Rosalie Clara Grubber (née Hirschfelder), a housewife of German Jewish descent, and his father was Gösta Carl Åkerlöf, a chemist and inventor, who was a Swedish immigrant. George has an older brother, Carl, a physics professor at the University of Michigan.

Akerlof attended Princeton Day School, before he graduated from the Lawrenceville School in 1958. He received a bachelor's degree in economics from Yale University in 1962, and earned his PhD in economics from the Massachusetts Institute of Technology (MIT) in 1966. His dissertation was titled Wages and Capital under the supervision of Robert Solow, a noted economist who would later receive the Nobel Memorial Prize.

== Academic career ==
After receiving his doctorate, Akerlof joined the faculty of the University of California, Berkeley, as an assistant professor of economics, although he taught for only one year before moving to India. In 1967, he spent some time as a visiting professor at the Indian Statistical Institute (ISI) in New Delhi and returned to the United States in September 1968. Akerlof then became an associate professor at Berkeley and voted for a tenure-track position at the university. He also served as a senior economist at the White House Council of Economic Advisers (CEA) from 1973 to 1974. In 1977, Akerlof spent a year as a visiting research economist for the Federal Reserve Board of Governors in Washington, D.C. where he met his future wife and coauthor, Janet Yellen. After that he hoped to be promoted to full professorship, however, Berkeley's department of economics failed to appoint him. Akerlof and Yellen then moved to the London School of Economics (LSE) in 1978, where he accepted a prestigious post as the Cassel Professor of Money and Banking, while she accepted a tenure-track lectureship. They remained in the United Kingdom for two years before returning to the United States.

In 1980, Akerlof became Goldman Professor of Economics at Berkeley and taught there for most of his career. In 1997, he took a leave of absence from Berkeley to accompany his wife when she was named chair of the Council of Economic Advisers (CEA). At Washington, Akerlof began working for the Brookings Institution as a senior fellow. They both returned to teaching at UC Berkeley in 1999. Akerlof remained an active faculty member at the university until his retirement. He was awarded Koshland Professor of Economics Emeritus in 2010.

After that, he once again moved to Washington when Yellen confirmed to the Federal Reserve Board. Akerlof received a position as visiting scholar at the International Monetary Fund (IMF) from 2010 to 2014 and joined the McCourt School of Public Policy at Georgetown University as a university professor in 2014.

== Contributions to economics ==
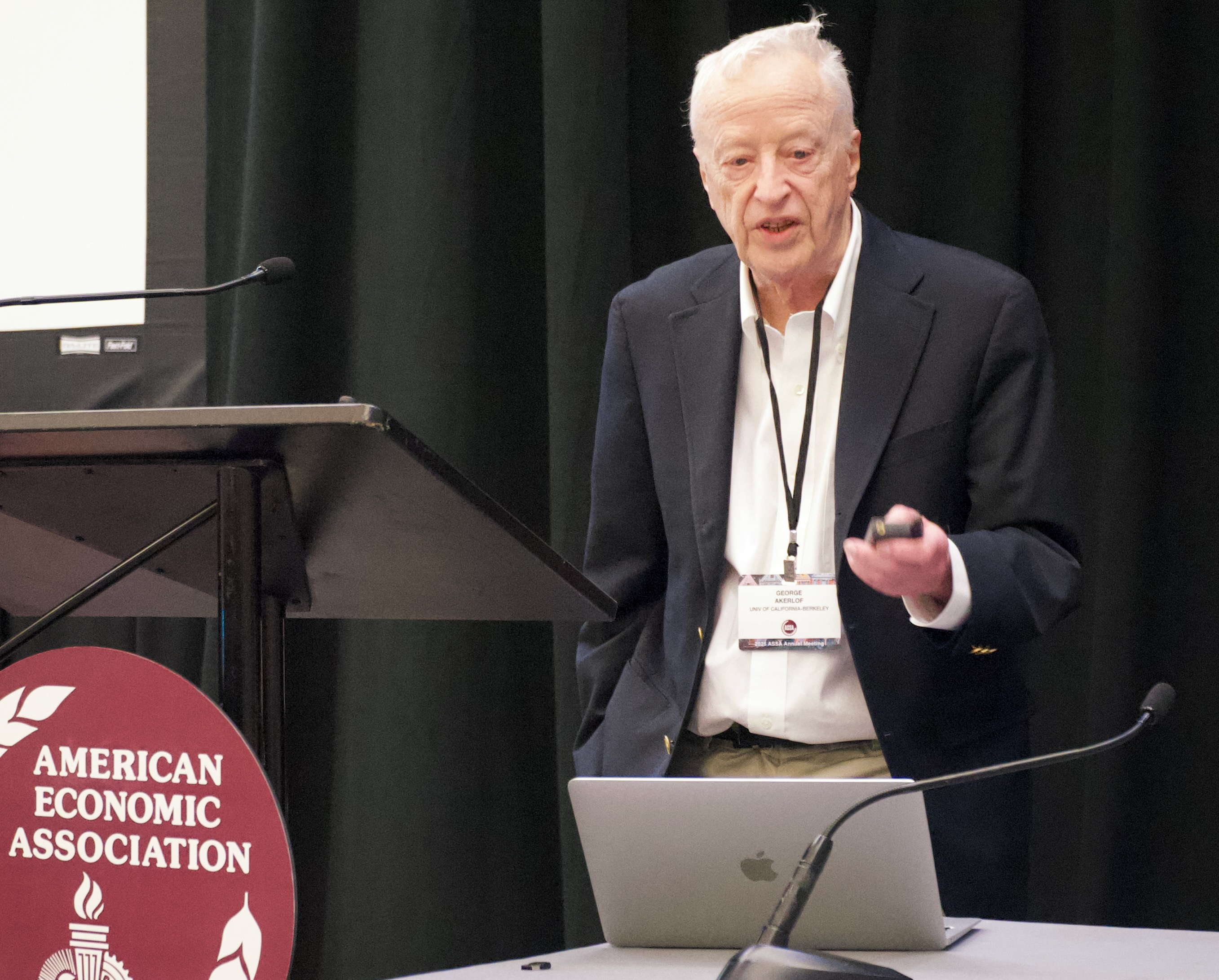
Akerlof speaking at AEA 2025

=== "The Market for Lemons" and asymmetric information ===
Akerlof is perhaps best known for his article, "The Market for Lemons: Quality Uncertainty and the Market Mechanism", published in the Quarterly Journal of Economics in 1970, in which he identified certain severe problems that afflict markets characterized by asymmetric information, the paper for which he was awarded the Nobel Memorial Prize. In Efficiency Wage Models of the Labor Market, Akerlof and coauthor/wife, Janet Yellen propose rationales for the efficiency wage hypothesis in which employers pay above the market-clearing wage, in contradiction to the conclusions of neoclassical economics. This work introduced gift-exchange game to economics.

=== Identity economics ===
Akerlof and collaborator Rachel Kranton of Duke University have introduced social identity into formal economic analysis, creating the field of identity economics. Drawing on social psychology and many fields outside of economics, Akerlof and Kranton argue that individuals do not have preferences only over different goods and services. They also adhere to social norms for how different people should behave. The norms are linked to a person's social identities. These ideas first appeared in their article "Economics and Identity", published in the Quarterly Journal of Economics in 2000.

=== Reproductive technology shock ===
In the late 1970s, Akerlof's ideas attracted the attention of some on both sides of the debate over legal abortion. In articles appearing in The Quarterly Journal of Economics, The Economic Journal, and other forums, Akerlof described a phenomenon that he labeled "reproductive technology shock." He contended that the new technologies that had helped to spawn the late twentieth century sexual revolution, modern contraceptives and legal abortion, had not only failed to suppress the incidence of out-of-wedlock childbearing but also had actually worked to increase it. According to Akerlof, for women who did not use them, these technologies had largely transformed the old paradigm of socio-sexual assumptions, expectations, and behaviors in ways that were especially disadvantageous. For example, the availability of legal abortion now allowed men to view their offspring as the deliberate product of female choice rather than as the joint product of sexual intercourse. Thus, it encouraged biological fathers to reject not only the notion of an obligation to marry the mother but also the idea of a paternal obligation.

While Akerlof did not recommend legal restrictions on either abortion or the availability of contraceptives his analysis seemed to lend support to those who did. Thus, a scholar strongly associated with liberal and Democratic-leaning policy positions has been approvingly cited by conservative and Republican-leaning analysts and commentators.

=== Looting ===
In 1993 Akerlof and Paul Romer published "Looting: The Economic Underworld of Bankruptcy for Profit", describing how under certain conditions, owners of corporations will decide it is more profitable for them personally to 'loot' the company and 'extract value' from it instead of trying to make it grow and prosper. For example:

Bankruptcy for profit will occur if poor accounting, lax regulation, or low penalties for abuse give owners an incentive to pay themselves more than their firms are worth and then default on their debt obligations. Bankruptcy for profit occurs most commonly when a government guarantees a firm's debt obligations.

=== Norms and macroeconomics ===
In his 2007 presidential address to the American Economic Association, Akerlof proposed natural norms that decision makers have for how they should behave, and showed how such norms can explain discrepancies between theory and observed facts about the macroeconomy. Akerlof proposed a new agenda for macroeconomics, using social norms to explain macroeconomic behavior. He is considered together with Gary Becker as one of the founders of social economics.

He is a trustee of Economists for Peace and Security and co-director of the Social Interactions, Identity and Well-Being Program at the Canadian Institute for Advanced Research (CIFAR). He is on the advisory board of the Institute for New Economic Thinking. He was elected a fellow of the American Academy of Arts and Sciences in 1985.

For his work and contribution to economics and philosophy, he was awarded the third Witten Lectures in Economics and Philosophy at the Witten/Herdecke University in 2009.

== Political views ==
In June 2024, 16 Nobel Prize in Economics laureates, including Akerlof, signed an open letter arguing that Donald Trump's fiscal and trade policies coupled with efforts to limit the Federal Reserve's independence would reignite inflation in the United States.

== Personal life ==
Akerlof was briefly married to an architect, Kay Leong; they wed in 1974 and divorced three years later, after he did not get promoted to a full professorship at Berkeley. Following their divorce, Kay moved to New York and remarried a fellow architect. In 1978, Akerlof married Janet Yellen, an economist who was the former United States Secretary of the Treasury and former chair of the Federal Reserve, as well as a professor emeritus at Berkeley's Haas School of Business.

They have one son named Robert, a fellow economist born in 1981, who earned a bachelor's degree in economics and mathematics from Yale University in 2003 and then was awarded his PhD in economics from Harvard University in 2009. Robert previously worked for 14 years as an assistant and associate professor of economics at the University of Warwick, having firstly spent two years working as a postdoctoral associate at MIT after his PhD. In 2024, he became a full professor of economics at the UNSW Business School in Sydney.

Akerlof was one of the signees of a 2018 amici curiae brief that expressed support for Harvard in the Students for Fair Admissions v. President and Fellows of Harvard College lawsuit. Other signees of the brief include Alan B. Krueger, Cecilia E. Rouse, Robert M. Solow, Janet L. Yellen, as well as numerous others.

== Bibliography ==
- Akerlof, George A. (1984). An economic theorist's book of tales : essays that entertain the consequences of new assumptions in economic theory. Cambridge: Cambridge University Press.
- Akerlof, George A., and Janet Yellen. 1986. Efficiency Wage Models of the Labor Market. Orlando, Fla.: Academic Press.
- Akerlof, George A., Romer, Paul M., Brookings Papers on Economic Activity, "Looting: The Economic Underworld of Bankruptcy for Profit" Vol. 1993, No. 2 (1993), pp. 1–73
- Akerlof, George A. 2000. "Economics and Identity," Quarterly Journal of Economics, 115(3), pp. 715–53.
- Akerlof, George A. 2005. Explorations in Pragmatic Economics, Oxford University Press. ISBN 978-0199253906.
- Akerlof, George A. 2005. "Identity and the Economics of Organizations," Journal of Economic Perspectives, 19(1), pp. 9–32.
- Akerlof, George A. "Thoughts on global warming." chinadialogue (2006). 14 July 2008.
- Akerlof, George A. and Robert J. Shiller. 2009. Animal Spirits: How Human Psychology Drives the Economy, and Why It Matters for Global Capitalism. Princeton, New Jersey: Princeton University Press. ISBN 978-0691142333.
- Akerlof, George A., and Rachel E. Kranton. 2010. Identity Economics: How Our Identities Shape Our Work, Wages, and Well-Being, Princeton, New Jersey: Princeton University Press. ISBN 978-0691146485. Description & TOC, "Introduction," pp. 3–8, and preview.
- George A. Akerlof and Robert J. Shiller. 2015. Phishing for Phools: The Economics of Manipulation and Deception, Princeton University Press. ISBN 978-0691168319.

== See also ==
- List of Jewish Nobel laureates

Awards
Preceded by James J. Heckman; Daniel L. McFadden	Laureate of the Nobel Memorial Prize in Economics; 2001; Served alongside: A. Michael Spence, Joseph E. Stiglitz	Succeeded by Daniel Kahneman; Vernon L. Smith
Academic offices
Preceded by Daniel McFadden	President of the American Economic Association; 2006–2007	Succeeded by Thomas J. Sargent
