= Richard Brennan (biochemist) =

American biochemist

- Born: Richard Gerald Brennan
- Education: University of Wisconsin–Madison
- Occupation: Biochemist

Richard Gerald Brennan is an American biochemist. He is the James B. Duke Distinguished Professor in the department of biochemistry at Duke University.

In 2011, Brennan was named a fellow of the American Association for the Advancement of Science.
