= Jack D. Keene =

Professor of Molecular Genetics and Microbiology

- Born: Jack Donald Keene; June 22, 1947; Jacksonville, Florida, U.S.
- Education: University of California, Riverside, University of Washington
- Scientific career
- Workplaces: Duke University

Jack Donald Keene (born June 22, 1947) is a James B. Duke Professor of Molecular Genetics and Microbiology at Duke University.

Keene studies the regulation of RNA and the mechanisms of RNA-protein interactions. He identified RNA recognition motif (RRM) proteins, which are the largest family of RNA-binding proteins. He isolated the first human autoimmune antigen. He formalized the posttranscriptional operon and regulon (PTRO) model to describe global gene regulation, and proposed the RNA regulon hypothesis to better understand post-transcriptional regulation of mRNAs encoding proteins. Keene introduced the RIP (ribonucleoprotein immunoprecipitation) protocol for isolating specific mRNPs, which has become a tool for the mapping of mRNA targets of specific RBPs.

== Early life and education ==
Jack Donald Keene was born in Jacksonville, Florida on June 22, 1947. His father worked for the RAND Corporation. Keene attended Redlands High School in Redlands, California, graduating in 1965.

Initially a student at University of California, Los Angeles (UCLA), he transferred to the University of California, Riverside, where he majored in biology, working with Carlton Bovell. He received his A.B. degree in 1969. Next, Keene studied with Helen Riaboff Whiteley at the University of Washington in Seattle, Washington, graduating in 1975 with a doctorate in microbiology and Immunology.

He did postdoctoral work in molecular virology with Robert A. Lazzarini in the Laboratory for Molecular Genetics at the National Institutes of Health in Bethesda, Maryland from 1974 to 1978.

== Career ==
In 1979, Keene was recruited by Wolfgang Joklik to the department of microbiology and immunology at Duke University Medical Center. At that time the department was ranked one of the top three in the United States by the National Research Council. Keene was the chairman of the department of microbiology from 1992 to 2002, and director of basic sciences for the Duke Comprehensive Cancer Center from 1995 to 2003. As of 1997 he became the James B. Duke Professor of Molecular Genetics and Microbiology at Duke University. In 1999 Keene founded the Duke Center for RNA Biology.

== Research ==
Keene studies the regulation of RNA and the mechanisms of RNA-protein interactions.

In his work on molecular genetics, he and his coworkers have examined the role of DNA and RNA-binding proteins (RBPs) in the pathogenesis of autoimmunity. In the late 1970s and early 1980s he identified genomic sequences for vesicular stomatitis virus (VSV) and rabies virus (RABV), members of the Rhabdoviridae family of viruses, and for Ebola virus and Marburg virus from the broader group of negative-strand RNA viruses (NSRV). He identified the origins of defective interfering particles of negative-strand RNA viruses. Through combinatorial studies of viral and bacterial systems, he has identified targets for novel pharmacological studies.

Later in the 1980s, Keene identified RNA recognition motif (RRM) proteins. RRM proteins are the largest family of RNA-binding proteins and the seventh largest protein family of the human genome. RRM is a prevalent RNA-binding fold involving proteins implicated in RNA biogenesis, processing, transport, and degradation.

In 1987, Query and Keene first identified a B-cell epitope within the U1-70K protein. Keene isolated the first human autoimmune antigen and elucidated its autoimmune epitopes, the parts of an antigen to which antibodies in the immune system can bind. He cloned rheumatological autoimmune protein genes. He developed a diagnostic test for systemic lupus erythematosus using recombinant antigens.

Keene's lab has identified functions of the ELAV/Hu posttranscriptional regulators HuB, HuC and HuD and their roles and that of HuR in processes of growth, proliferation, differentiation, and immune response. The study of RNA-binding proteins such as HuR and the determination of the binding of specific sequences have informed Keene's later post-transcription theory and his coordination theory of RNA operons.

RNA-binding proteins appear to be implicated in the functioning of many posttranscriptional processes. As of 1994, Keene suggested that RNA-binding proteins could be involved in the regulation of messenger RNA that encode cytokines. In 2000, he was able to apply this approach to demonstrate neuronal differentiation. He also introduced the first use of the RIP (ribonucleoprotein immunoprecipitation) protocol, isolating specific mRNPs using immunoprecipitation, and identifying the mRNA component with microarray or deep sequencing. This method has become a tool for the mapping of mRNA targets of specific RBPs.

In 2001–2002, Keene formalized the posttranscriptional operon and regulon (PTRO) model for global gene regulation. By 2007, Keene proposed the RNA regulon hypothesis, "that mRNAs encoded by functionally related genes may be coordinately regulated as posttranscriptional RNA regulons by specific mRNP processing machineries". The purpose of the RNA regulon model was to better understand post-transcriptional regulation, to answer the question "How does the cell coordinate metabolism and regulation of mRNAs encoding proteins in the same biological process so that the proteins can be coordinately produced?"

== Awards and honors ==
- 1985, Pew Scholar in the Biomedical Sciences, The Pew Charitable Trusts.
- 2009, Fellow, American Academy of Microbiology
- 2009, James Buchanan Duke Distinguished Professorship, Duke University.
- 2009, Member, American Academy of Microbiology
