= David Aers =

British academic

- Born: 3 October 1946 (age 80); Lahore, British Raj
- Awards: James B. Duke Professor

Academic background
- Education: Tonbridge School
- Alma mater: Queens' College, Cambridge; University of York

Academic work
- Discipline: English literature, Historical theology, Mediaeval and Renaissance history
- Institutions: University of East Anglia; Duke University

David Roland Aers (born 3 October 1946) is a James B. Duke Professor of English, historical theology and religion at Duke University. He has published widely on literature, sacramental culture and ideology in medieval and Renaissance England.

After attending Tonbridge School he went up to Queens' College, Cambridge, where he played first-class cricket as a left-arm spin bowler for Cambridge University from 1966 to 1968. He earned his doctorate at the University of York.

He is a former editor of the Journal of Medieval and Early Modern Studies. His most influential work traces the influence of the Church Fathers in late medieval and early modern poetry and culture to work out questions of politics, gender, and social ethics.

Aers taught at the University of East Anglia before going to Duke in the mid-1990s. In 1998 he was awarded the Trinity College Distinguished Teaching Award. In an interview that shortly followed the award, he is quoted as saying, "My work moves between literature, theology, politics and history. The academic parceling up of these subjects can become an impediment to studying what I want to study, so that's the motive for interdisciplinarity. When I think about ethics, I can't help but think about politics. When I think about my Christianity, I'm also thinking about social justice. The questions I'm asking go directly across what have grown up as disciplinary boundaries within the modern academy."

== Selected publications ==
- Salvation and Sin: Augustine, Langland, and Fourteenth-Century Theology (University of Notre Dame Press, 2009)
- Sanctifying Signs: Making Christian Tradition in Late Medieval England (Notre Dame University Press, 2004)
- "New Historicism and the Eucharist", Journal of Medieval and Early Modern Studies 33 (2): 241-259, 2003
- "Chaucer's Tale of Melibee: Whose Virtues?" in Medieval Literature and Historical Inquiry: Essays in Honor of Derek Pearsall, Ed. David Aers (Brewer, 2000)
- Faith, Ethics and Church: Writing in England, 1360-1490 (Brewer, 2000)
- Powers of the Holy: Religion, Politics, and Gender in Late Medieval English Culture, David Aers and Lynn Staley (Penn State University Press, 1996)
- Community, Gender and Individual Identity in English Writing: 1360-1430 (Routledge, 1988)
- Chaucer (Harvester, 1986)
- Chaucer, Langland, and the Creative Imagination (Routledge & Kegan Paul, 1980)
- Piers Plowman and Christian Allegory (St. Martin's Press, 1975)
