= Charles Engel =

American economist

Charles M. Engel

Academic background
- Education: University of California, Berkeley (Ph.D.); University of North Carolina at Chapel Hill (B.A.)
- Doctoral advisor: Jeffrey Frankel; George Akerlof; Janet Yellen

Academic work
- Discipline: International Finance and Economics
- School or tradition: New Keynesian economics
- Institutions: University of Wisconsin–Madison; National Bureau of Economic Research; Centre for Economic Policy Research
- Website: Information at IDEAS / RePEc

Charles Engel is an American economist and the Hester professor in the economics department at the University of Wisconsin-Madison. He does research on nominal/real exchange rate movements.

== Career ==
Engel received a B.A. from University of North Carolina at Chapel Hill in 1977. After receiving his doctorate in economics from University of California, Berkeley in 1983, he held faculty positions at the University of Virginia and the University of Washington before moving to University of Wisconsin-Madison. He has since 1989 been a research associate at The National Bureau of Economic Research. He has since 2001 been an editor of the Journal of International Economics, which is a top field journal in international economics.

He has served on the board of editors for American Economic Review (April 2002 – March 2008).

He has since 2008 been a senior fellow at the Globalization and Monetary Policy Institute at the Federal Reserve Bank of Dallas.

== Contributions ==
His paper coauthored with John Rogers, "How Wide is the Border?", empirically studies price dispersion across cities in different countries and finds that the extent of international failures of the law of one price is large. This paper initiated a long line of economic research investigating "the border effect" on international price dispersion. According to the Social Sciences Citation Index, the paper is in the top percentile of papers published in the top tier of economics journals. In Engel (1999), he finds that the vast majority of U.S. real exchange rate movements came from fluctuations in tradable good prices, contradicting the conventional views at that time that real exchange rate movements are mainly due to fluctuations in non-tradable good prices, and thus posing another empirical puzzle in the literature regarding the law of one price.

In Engel and West (2005), Engel and West propose a theorem explaining unpredictability of nominal exchange rate movements. This theorem is one of the first theoretical approaches in international economics to explaining why there are no solid regressors in the data for predicting nominal exchange rate movements in the short run.
