= Livermore Optical Transient Imaging System =

Gamma-ray burst telescope

- Alternative names: LOTIS
- Location: California, Pacific States Region
- First light: October 1996
- Number of telescopes: 4
- Diameter: 11 cm (4.3 in)

The Livermore Optical Transient Imaging System, or LOTIS, is an automated telescope designed to slew very rapidly to the location of gamma-ray bursts (GRBs), to enable the simultaneous measurement of optical counterparts. Since GRBs can occur anywhere in the sky, are often poorly localized, and fade very quickly, this implies very rapid slewing (less than 10 sec) and a wide field of view (greater than 15 degrees). To achieve the needed response time, LOTIS was fully automated and connected via Internet socket to the Gamma-ray Burst Coordinates Network. This network analyzes telemetry from satellite such as HETE-2 and Swift Gamma-Ray Burst Mission and delivers GRB coordinate information in real-time. The optics were built from 4 commercial tele-photo lenses of 11 cm aperture, with custom 2048 X 2048 CCD cameras, and could view a 17.6 X 17.6 degree field.

LOTIS started routine operation in October 1996, with a limiting magnitude M_{v}≈11.5 . In March 1998 it was upgraded with cooled cameras, resulting in a limiting sensitivity of M_{v}≈14. It was in operation until at least 2001, but never successfully detected the optical counterpart of a GRB, though it did set upper limits. By 2001, the 4 cameras had been co-aligned and two of them had added filters. In the idle time between GRB triggers, LOTIS systematically surveyed the entire available sky every night for new optical transients. LOTIS was succeeded by another robotic telescope with a larger mirror but smaller field of view, called Super-LOTIS.

== Super-LOTIS ==
Livermore Optical Transient Imaging System
- Alternative names: LOTIS
- Location: California, Pacific States Region
- First light: October 1996
- Number of telescopes: 4
- Diameter: 11 cm (4.3 in)

Super-LOTIS is the second incarnation of the Livermore Optical Transient Imaging System, located at the Steward Observatory on Kitt Peak. It is an automated telescope designed to slew very rapidly to the location of gamma-ray bursts (GRBs), to enable the simultaneous measurement of optical counterparts. GRBs can occur anywhere in the sky, fade very quickly, and were initially poorly localized, so the original LOTIS needed very rapid slewing (less than 10 sec) and an extremely wide field of view (greater than 15 degrees). However, this wide field of view meant it could not see faint sources, and only the brightest GRB afterglows could be studied.

Later satellites such as HETE-2, and BATSE detector of the Compton Gamma Ray Observatory, delivered much more accurate GRB coordinates in real-time. This enabled the construction of Super-LOTIS, based upon a Boller and Chivens 0.6 meter telescope, with a much smaller field of view (originally 51' by 51'), but much deeper imaging. After a few years of operation in this mode (2000 to 2003), the Swift Gamma-Ray Burst Mission was launched in 2004 providing even smaller error boxes. The super-LOTIS optics were modified again, now with a 17' by 17' field of view at the secondary focus, and a simultaneous visible/NIR camera.

To achieve the needed response time, Super-LOTIS is fully automated and connected via Internet socket to the Gamma-ray Burst Coordinates Network. It is still in operation as of 2012.

Since GRB searches only occupy a small fraction of the possible observing time, Super-LOTIS is also used for supernova searches and general astronomy.

== See also ==
- Robotic Optical Transient Search Experiment, another similar wide field robotic telescope for GRB follow-up.
