= Patrick J. Casey =

American biochemist and pharmacologist

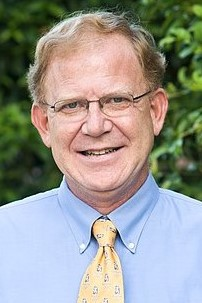
- Born: Patrick J. Casey; Mitchell, South Dakota
- Education: Augustana University; Brandeis University
- Awards: Public Administration Medal (2020)
- Scientific career
- Fields: Biochemistry; Pharmacology
- Workplaces: Duke University School of Medicine; Duke-NUS Medical School

Patrick John Casey is an American biochemist and molecular pharmacologist who is James B. Duke Professor of Pharmacology and Cancer Biology at Duke University School of Medicine. In 2005, he relocated to Singapore to help found the Duke-NUS Medical School Singapore, where he served as its Senior Vice Dean of Research through July, 2023.

== Early life and education ==
Casey grew up on a family farm near Mitchell, South Dakota. He received a B.A. in Biology and Chemistry from Augustana College in Sioux Falls, South Dakota, in 1978. After three years working as an analytical chemist at the James Ford Bell Technical Center in Minneapolis, he entered the PhD program in Biochemistry at Brandeis University, receiving his degree in 1986. Casey did postdoctoral training from 1986 to 1990 at the University of Texas Southwestern Medical Center with Alfred G. Gilman.

== Career ==
Casey joined the faculty at Duke University in 1990 as an assistant professor of Pharmacology and Cancer Biology and Biochemistry. His primary areas of research are in the fields of lipid modifications of proteins and in G protein signaling in cancer. Casey was the founding director of the Duke Center for Chemical Biology, established to spearhead interdisciplinary research and training in the application of fundamental chemical principles to the study of biology and the basis of disease and therapies. Awards for his work include the Established Investigator Award from the American Heart Association in 1992 and the Amgen Award from the American Society of Biochemistry and Molecular Biology in 2000. Casey was elected a Fellow of the American Association for the Advancement of Science in 2012, and received the Distinguished Faculty Award from the Duke Medical Alumni Association in 2018.

Casey relocated to Singapore in 2005 to spearhead the development of the Duke-NUS Medical School. In July, 2023, Casey stepped down as Senior Vice Dean of Research at Duke-NUS, while remaining on the faculty of that institution and Duke University School of Medicine as Professor and Senior Advisor.

In recognition of his public sector service in Singapore, Casey was awarded the Public Administration Medal (Silver) at Singapore's National Day ceremony in Aug. 2020. Casey was appointed to the Board of Directors of Legend Biotech in Dec. 2020.

Casey was a founding member, and served as Director for 10 years, of Duke University's Graduate Program in Molecular Cancer Biology, and led the development of a unique PhD Program in Integrated Biology and Medicine at Duke-NUS.

== Selected publications ==
- Casey, P.J., Solski, P.A., Der, C.J., and Buss, J.E. (1989) p21ras is modified by a farnesyl isoprenoid. Proc. Natl. Acad. Sci. USA 86:8323-8327.
- Casey, P.J., Thissen, J.A. & Moomaw, J.F. (1991) Enzymatic modification of proteins with a geranylgeranyl isoprenoid. Proc. Natl. Acad. Sci. USA 88:8631-8635.
- Casey, P.J. (1995) Protein lipidation in cell signaling. Science 268:221-225.
- Zhang, F.L. & Casey, P.J. (1996) Protein prenylation: Molecular mechanisms and biological consequences. Annu. Rev. Biochem. 65:241-269.
- Park, H.W., Boduluri, S.R., Moomaw, J.F., Casey, P.J. & Beese, L.S. (1997) Crystal structure of protein farnesyltransferase at 2.25 Å resolution. Science 275:1800-1804.
- Meigs, T.E, Fields, T.A., McKee, D.D. & Casey, P.J. (2001) Interaction of Gα12 and Gα13 with the cytoplasmic domain of cadherin provides a mechanism for β-catenin release. Proc. Natl. Acad. Sci. USA 98:519-524.
- Long, S.B., Casey, P.J. & Beese, L.S. (2002) Reaction path of protein farnesyltransferase at atomic resolution. Nature 419:645-650.
- Winter-Vann, A.M., Baron, R.A., Wong, W., Dela Cruz, J., York, J.D., Gooden, D., Bergo, M.O., Young, S.G., Toone, E.J. & Casey, P.J. (2005) A small molecule inhibitor of isoprenylcysteine carboxylmethyltransferase with antitumor activity in cancer cells. Proc. Natl. Acad. Sci. USA 102:4336-4341.
- Winter-Vann, A.M. & Casey, P.J. (2005) Post-prenylation processing enzymes as targets for development of anti-cancer therapeutics. Nature Rev. Cancer 5:405-412.
- Kelly, P., Moeller, B.J., Booden, M.A., Kasbohm, E.A., Madden, J.F., Der, C.J., Daaka, Y, Dewhirst, M.W., Fields, T.A. & Casey, P.J. (2006) The G12 family of heterotrimeric G-proteins promotes cancer invasion and metastasis. Proc. Natl. Acad. Sci. USA 103:8173-8178.
- Wang, M., Tan, W., Coolman, B., Zhou, J., Liu, S., & Casey, P.J. (2010) Inhibition of isoprenylcysteine carboxylmethyltransferase induces autophagic-dependent apoptosis and impairs tumor growth in hepatocellular carcinoma. Oncogene 29(35):4959-4970.
- Wang, M. & Casey, P.J. (2016) Protein prenylation: unique fats make their mark on biology. Nat. Rev. Mol. Cell Biol. 17:110–122.
