= Allen C. Kelley =

American economist

Allen Charles Kelley (September 5, 1937 – December 9, 2017) was an American economist who taught at University of Wisconsin–Madison and later Duke University, where he was James B. Duke Professor of Economics.

Born in Everett, Washington, Kelley enrolled at Linfield College before transferring to Stanford University, where he joined Phi Beta Kappa. He earned a doctorate in economics from Stanford in 1964. He then joined the faculty of the University of Wisconsin–Madison, moving to Duke University in 1973. Kelley chaired Duke's Department of Economics from 1974 to 1980, and was eventually named James B. Duke Professor of Economics. Kelley's research interests included the modeling of computational general equilibrium. He developed the Teaching Information Processing System while in Madison, and continued using the technological program to teach economic principles at Duke. Additionally, Kelley sought endowment funds for first-year doctoral students in economics at Duke. He died at the age of 80 on December 9, 2017.
