= Ralph Braibanti =

Ralph Braibanti (1920 - November 24, 2005) was the James B. Duke Professor of political science at Duke University, and was known for his work in Islamic studies; his work focused on Pakistan. He founded the American Institute of Pakistan Studies and served as its President for nine years.

Braibanti was born 1920 in Danbury, Connecticut of Italian and Polish heritage and taught at Syracuse University and Kenyon College before coming to Duke. He died in 2005.
