= Bob Coats =

Alfred William "Bob" Coats (3 September 1924, Southall, West London, England – 9 April 2007, Middleton-on-Sea, Sussex, England) was a British economist, economic historian and historian of economic thought. He made important contributions to the study of the history, methodology, sociology, professionalisation and internationalisation of economics, and was for many decades a central figure in professional societies in these specialised fields.

== Life and work ==
Bob Coats studied economics at the University College of the South and West (now the University of Exeter. His studies were interrupted by war service (in the RAF and as an intelligence officer in Palestine) for three and a half years who has covered a broad range of topics over his long career. He obtained his BSc and MSc at the University of London in 1948 and 1950 respectively. An English-Speaking Union scholarship enabled him to work in the United States on a PhD on the development of American economic thought, first at University of Pittsburgh, subsequently at Johns Hopkins University. He initially undertook a study into the work of John Bates Clark, but soon broadened the subject, resulting in his thesis "Methodological Controversy as an Approach to the History of American Economic Thought, 1885 - 1930" that he completed in 1953.

He returned to England the same year to accept an appointment as lecturer in economic history at the University of Nottingham, where he remained until his retirement in 1992, with the exception of two years as a "founding father" of the (then) new University of York (1962–1964). From 1964, he held a full Professorship in Economic and Social History.

Coats introduced the "sociology of economics" approach in Britain, moving from the organisation of economics to the role of economists in government. In this area, he edited a number of important collections of articles, mostly written by "insiders".

He was a very active member and organiser in the professional organisations in his fields of interest, especially through his editorial work and numerous contributions to the most important journals.

== Major publications ==
- Coats, A. W. (1954). "The Historist Reaction in English Political Economy 1870-90". Economica. 21 (82): 143–153. doi:10.2307/2551664. JSTOR 2551664.
- "Is There a Structure of Scientific Revolutions in Economics?" Kyklos, 1969, 22(2), pp. 289–296. Abstract.
- Coats, A W, ed. (1971). The Classical Economists and Economic Policy.
- Coats, A W; R.D. Collison Black; Craufurd Goodwin, eds. (1972). The Marginal Revolution in Economics.
- Coats, A W, ed. (1981). Economists in Government, an International Comparative Study.
- Coats, A W, ed. (1986). The Role of Economists in International Agencies: An Exploratory Study.
- Coats, A W (1992). On the History of Economic Thought. British and American Economic Essays. Vol. I.
- Coats, A W (1993). The Sociology and Professionalisation of Economics. British and American Economic Essays. Vol. II. Chapter-preview links.
- Coats, A W (1996). "Memoirs of an Economist Watcher". Journal of the History of Economic Thought. 18 (2): 250–270. doi:10.1017/S1053837200003266. S2CID 153322899. Abstract.
- Coats, A W, ed. (1996). "The Post-1945 Internationalisation of Economics". History of Political Economy (Annual Supplement).
- Coats, A W, ed. (2000). The Development of Economics in Western Europe after 1945.
- Coats, A. W. (2001). "The Role of Economists in Government and International Agencies: A Fresh Look at the Field". History of Economics Review. 34 (1): 19–32. doi:10.1080/10370196.2001.11733356. S2CID 156205412.

== Honours ==
- In 1996, he was made a Distinguished Fellow of the History of Economics Society.

== Secondary sources ==
- R. Backhouse, B. Caldwell, C. Goodwin, M. Rutherford - "A. W. (Bob) Coats, 1924–2007", History of Political Economy 40(3): 421-446 (2008)
- M. Blaug (ed.) - Who's who in economics (3d edition), 1999.
- N. De Marchi - "Bob Coats and the historicizing of economic policy", in Historians of Economics and Economic Thought. The Construction of Disciplinary Memory, ed. Steven G. Medema and Warren J. Samuels, 2001.
- P. Groenewegen - "Obituary Professor A.W. (Bob) Coats", History of Economics Review, 45, Winter 2007.
- J. Maloney - "Obituary A.W. Bob Coats, 1924 - 2007", European Journal of the History of Economic Thought, 15:1, March 2008.
