= Sanjeev Goyal =

Indian-British economist

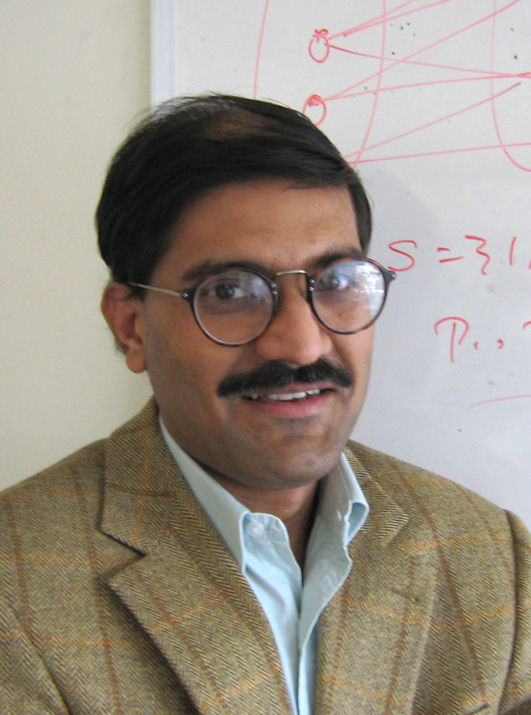
- Goyal in March 2007
- Education: Delhi University; IIM Ahmedabad; Cornell University
- Known for: Economic theory Networks
- Awards: National Talent Scholar Gold Medal, Delhi Univ. A.D White Fellow, Cornell
- Scientific career
- Fields: Microeconomics
- Workplaces: Erasmus University; Cambridge University
- Doctoral advisor: David Easley; Lawrence E. Blume; Tapan Mitra; Karl Shell

Sanjeev Goyal FBA is an Indian-British economist, best known for his pioneering research on networks.

He is currently Arthur C. Pigou Professor of Economics at the University of Cambridge and a Fellow of Christ's College, Cambridge. His book, Connections: an introduction to the economics of networks, was published by Princeton University Press in 2007; his second book, Networks: An Economics Approach, was published by MIT Press in 2023.

Sanjeev Goyal is a Fellow of the British Academy and Fellow of the Econometric Society. He was the founding Director of the Cambridge-INET Institute (2012–2014) and Chair of the Cambridge Economics Faculty (2014–2018).
