= Causation in economics =

Causation in economics has a long history with Adam Smith explicitly acknowledging its importance via his (1776) An Inquiry into the Nature and Causes of the Wealth of Nations and David Hume (1739, 1742, 1777) and John Stuart Mill (1848) both offering important contributions with more philosophical discussions. Hoover (2006) suggests that a useful way of classifying approaches to causation in economics might be to distinguish between approaches that emphasize structure and those that emphasize process and to add to this a distinction between approaches that adopt a priori reasoning and those that seek to infer causation from the evidence provided by data. He represented this schematically with a little table which usefully identifies key works in each of the four categories.

Table 1. Classification of Approaches to Causality in Economics from Hoover (2006).

	Structural	Process
A Priori	Cowles Commission: Koopmans (1953); Hood and Koopmans (1953)	Zellner (1979)
Inferential	Simon (1953); Hoover (1990, 2001); Favero and Hendry (1992); Natural Experiments: Angrist and Krueger (1999, 2001)	Granger (1969); Vector Autoregressions: (Sims 1980)

== Sources ==
- Hausman, D. M. (1988, January). Ceteris paribus clauses and causality in economics. In PSA: Proceedings of the Biennial Meeting of the Philosophy of Science Association (Vol. 1988, No. 2, pp. 308-316). Cambridge University Press.
- Hicks, John (1980). Causality in economics. Australian National University Press, 1980.
- Hodgson, G. M. (2001). Darwin, Veblen and the problem of causality in economics. History and Philosophy of the Life Sciences, 385-423.
- Samuelson, P. (1972). Some notions of causality and teleology in economics. The collected scientific papers of Paul A. Samuelson, 3, 428-472.
- Wold, H. (1954). Causality and econometrics. Econometrica: Journal of the Econometric Society, 162-177.
- Zellner, A. (1988). Causality and causal laws in economics. Journal of econometrics, 39(1-2), 7-21.

== References cited in Hoover ==
Angrist, Joshua D. and Alan B. Krueger. (1999) “Empirical Strategies in Labor Economics,” in Orley Ashenfelter and David Card, editors. Handbook of Labor Economics, vol. 3A. Amsterdam: Elsevier, pp. 1277–1366.

Angrist, Joshua D. and Alan B. Krueger. (2001) “Instrumental Variables and the Search for Identification: From Supply and Demand to Natural Experiments,” Journal of Economic Perspectives 15(4), 69–85.

Favero, Carlos. and David F. Hendry. (1992) “Testing the Lucas Critique: A Review,” Econometric Reviews 11(3), 265–306.

Granger, C.W.J. (1969) “Investigating Causal Relations by Econometric Models and Cross-Spectral Methods,” Econometrica, 37(3), 424–438.

Hood, William C. and Tjalling Koopmans, editors. (1953) Studies in Econometric Method, Cowles Commission Monograph 14. New Haven: Yale University Press.

Hoover, Kevin D. (1990) “The Logic of Causal Inference: Econometrics and the Conditional Analysis of Causality,” Economics and Philosophy 6(2), 207–234.

Hoover, Kevin D. (2001) Causality in Macroeconomics. Cambridge: Cambridge University Press.

Hume, David. (1739) A Treatise of Human Nature.

Hume, David. (1742) “Of Interest,” in Essays: Moral, Political, and Literary.

Hume, David. (1777) An Enquiry Concerning Human Understanding.

Koopmans, Tjalling, ed. (1950) Statistical Inference in Dynamic Economic Models, Cowles Commission Monograph 10. New York: Wiley.

Mill, John Stuart. (1848) Principles of Political Economy with Some of Their Applications to Social Philosophy

Simon, Herbert A. 1953 “Causal Order and Identifiability,” in Hood and Koopmans (1953), pp. 49–74.

Sims, Christopher A. (1980). “Macroeconomics and Reality,” Econometrica 48, 1-48.

Smith Adam (1776) An Inquiry into the Nature and Causes of the Wealth of Nations

Zellner, Arnold A. (1979) “Causality and Econometrics,” in Karl Brunner and Allan H. Meltzer, editors. Three Aspects of Policy Making: Knowledge, Data and Institutions, Carnegie-Rochester Conference Series on Public Policy, vol. 10. Amsterdam, North-Holland, pp. 9–54.
