= Rachel Kranton =

American economist

Academic background
- Education: UC Berkeley (Ph.D.); Princeton University (M.P.A.); University of Pennsylvania (B.A.)

Academic work
- Discipline: Microeconomics; Economic Theory; Development Economics
- School or tradition: Microeconomics
- Institutions: Duke University
- Awards: Fellow Econometric Society Member National Academy of Sciences Member American Academy of Arts & Sciences Blaise Pascal Chair (2010)
- Website: Information at IDEAS / RePEc

Rachel E. Kranton (born c. 1962) is an American economist and James B. Duke Professor Distinguished Professor of Economics at Duke University. She is a member of the National Academy of Sciences, the American Academy of Arts & Science, Fellow of the Econometric Society, and 2010 recipient of the Blaise Pascal Chair. She was elected to serve on the Executive Committee of the American Economic Association(AEA) from 2015 to 2018 and was elected to serve as Vice-President in 2026-27. Kranton's research focuses on how social institutions affect economic outcomes, and has applications in a variety of fields within economics, such as economic development, international economics, and industrial organization.

More specifically, Kranton studies social networks and develops formal theories of how social networks affect economic behavior, the effects of buyer-seller networks, institutions in colonial India, and reciprocal exchange. By this, she's a major contributor to the emerging new field of economics of networks. She uses formal models of strategic interaction in select economic settings, and draws on these findings through mathematical tools to find how network structures influence economic outcomes. She also focuses on the cost and benefits of networks and informal exchange, which is the economic activity through social relationship.

In a long-term collaboration, Kranton and George Akerlof of University of California, Berkeley introduce social identity into formal economic analysis. In 2010, Akerlof and published Identity Economics, which provides a comprehensive and accessible discussion of their research. In a review for Science, Robert Sugden writes: "Nonspecialist readers will find a lot of insightful and well-informed analysis of how issues of identity affect real economic problems." Bloomberg lists Identity Economics as one of the top 30 business books of 2010.

== Biography ==
Rachel Kranton completed her undergraduate degree in Economics and in Middle East Studies at the University of Pennsylvania. She then earned an M.P.A. in economics and public affairs from the Woodrow Wilson School at Princeton University, and later her Ph.D. in economics from the University of California, Berkeley.

Kranton has held positions at the University of Maryland and Duke University, and received research fellowships at the Russell Sage Foundation and Princeton's Institute for Advanced Study. In 2011–12, Kranton was a visiting professor at the Paris School of Economics. She served as dean of social sciences at Duke University from July 2018 to June 2022.

== Research ==
Rachel Kranton's research interests is on the effect of institutions and the social setting on economic outcomes. She has made huge influence in the field of Identity Economics and the economics of networks. Her work includes a general framework to study social norms and identity in economics (together with her collaborator George Akerlof) and formal models of strategic interaction in different economic settings. Her publications can be found in the link * Kranton's Duke econ page She has achieved grant for her researches: Social Influences on Financial Decision Making, Networks, Public Goods, And Social Interactions: At The Edge Of Analytics and Complexity and Collabarative Research: CDI-Type I: Innovation in Social Networks.

== Recognition ==
Rachel Kranton was elected fellow of the American Academy of Arts and Sciences in 2020. She was elected to the National Academy of Sciences in 2021.

Rachel Kranton was recognized in an article by Gregory Phillips (a communications manager at the Fuqua School of Business & staff member at Duke University)'Desire To Be In A Group Leads To Harsher Judgement Of Others,' which recognized Kranton for her study of "groupiness." This study divided a portion of 141 participants into three different settings, including, 1)declared political leanings, 2)a more neutral group using the participants preferences of similar poems and paintings, 3)a random grouping. These three groups were asked to distribute money amongst themselves in their groups, or to themselves and someone outside their group. This test was used to determine if there were discriminatory factors against people outside of their groups. Yet, the result of this study found that this separate grouping created biases against people outside of their group, regardless of their political beliefs. It was found that a third of the participants were more likely to be politically independent and not have a group bias in the allocation of these assets. Some of the other findings was that the "groupiness" of people does not relate to gender or ethnicity.

== Notable previous positions ==
- Dean of Social Sciences, Trinity College, Duke University, 2018–2022.
- Professor, Department of Economics, Duke University, 2007–2012.
- Chaire Blaise Pascal, Paris School of Economics, 2011–2012.
- Professor, Department of Economics, University of Maryland, 2004–2008.
- Visiting associate professor, Department of Economics, Princeton University, 2002–2003
- Member, School of Social Science, Institute for Advanced Study, 2001–2002.
- Russell Sage Foundation Visiting Scholar, New York, NY, 1997–1998.

== Professional service ==
- Founding executive committee, Economic Research on Identity, Norms, and Narratives (ERINN), 2016–present.
- Core, Theoretical Research in Development Economics (ThReD), 2015–present.
- Managing editor, The Economic Journal, 2017–2020.
- Executive committee (elected member), American Economic Association, 2015–2018.
- Editorial board, Journal of Economic Literature, 2013–2019.
- Editorial board, American Economic Review, 2001–2007.
