= David Easley =

American economist

- Born: c. 1950s
- Education: Northwestern University Kellogg School of Management (Ph.D.)
- Known for: Market microstructure, Asset pricing, Networks
- Awards: Fellow, Econometric Society; Frederick W. Lanchester Prize (2011)
- Scientific career
- Fields: Economics, Financial economics, Decision theory
- Workplaces: Cornell University
- Doctoral students: Sanjeev Goyal

David Alan Easley (born 1950s) is an American economist. Easley is the Henry Scarborough Professor of Social Science and is a professor of information science at Cornell University.

He was previously an overseas fellow of Churchill College at Cambridge University. His research is in the field of economics, finance and decision theory. In economics, he focuses on learning, wealth dynamics and natural selection in markets. In finance, his work focuses on market microstructure and asset pricing. In decision theory, he works on modeling decision making in complex environments. In networks, he works on network formation and trading networks with colleagues in the computer science department at Cornell.

He is a fellow of the Econometric Society and is a chair of the NASDAQ-OMX economic advisory board.

Several of his scientific papers are listed among the most read in finance, according to the Social Science Research Network

Easley earned his Ph.D. from Northwestern University in 1979.

== Notable publications ==
- Price, Trade Size, and Information in Securities Markets, with Maureen O'Hara, Journal of Financial Economics, 19, 1987.
- Information and the Cost of Capital, with Maureen O'Hara, Journal of Finance, Vol. 59, No. 4, August, 2004.
- David Easley; Jon Kleinberg (19 July 2010). Networks, Crowds, and Markets: Reasoning About a Highly Connected World. Cambridge University Press. ISBN 978-1-139-49030-6.
