= Kenneth Poss =

American biologist (born 1971)

Ken Poss Ph.D.
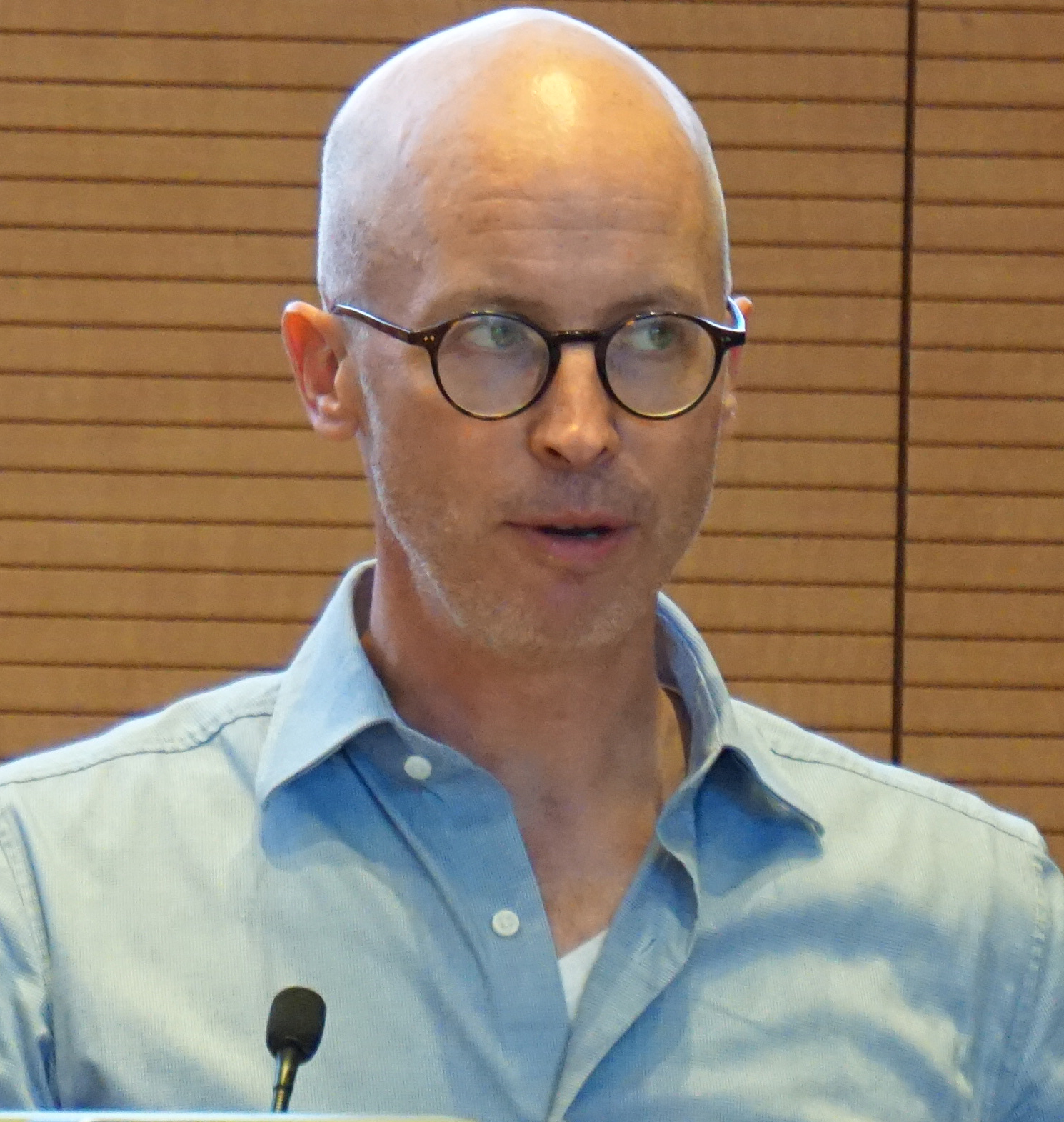
- Poss in 2018
- Born: Green Bay, Wisconsin, U.S.
- Education: Carleton College Massachusetts Institute of Technology
- Scientific career
- Doctoral advisor: Susumu Tonegawa
- Other academic advisors: Mark Keating
- Website: https://morgridge.org/research/labs/poss/

Kenneth D. Poss (born 1971 in Green Bay, Wisconsin) is an American biologist and currently director and James W. Neupert Investigator in Regenerative Biology at the Morgridge Institute for Research and a professor in the department of Cell and Regenerative Biology at the University of Wisconsin-Madison.

== Career ==
Poss received a B.A. in biology from Carleton College (Minnesota) in 1992, and a Ph.D. in biology in 1998 from Massachusetts Institute of Technology working with Susumu Tonegawa. Poss did postdoctoral research with Mark Keating, first at University of Utah and then at Harvard Medical School. From 2003 to 2024, he led a research program at Duke University investigating zebrafish models of regeneration, where he served as James B. Duke Professor of Regenerative Biology and Head of the Duke University Regeneration Center (Durham, North Carolina). Poss joined the Morgridge Institute for Research in the fall of 2024. He co-founded and served as the first president of the International Society for Regenerative Biology.

=== Research ===
Poss uses zebrafish to understand how and why tissue regeneration occurs. As a postdoc, he led the first positional cloning of a gene required for regeneration of amputated fins, and he established zebrafish as a model for innate heart regeneration. The latter discovery made clear that heart regeneration occurs and is efficient in some vertebrates, and that it could be dissected using molecular genetics using zebrafish a tractable model system. Since then, he and his postdocs, students, and staff have created many tools to interrogate tissue regeneration.

Poss reported that heart muscle cells, not stem cells, are activated by injury to divide and directly replace lost cardiac tissue. His lab has a history of research findings on the outer layer of the heart, the epicardium, beginning with discovery of its dynamism upon injury, to its fate-mapping, to its roles in releasing pro-regenerative factors, and to studies describing its own regenerative capacity. His group applied Brainbow-based technology to demonstrate that particularly high proliferative activity by a small number of muscle cells, known as clonal dominance, creates the structure of the adult heart. His lab also identified a key factor important for the process by which zebrafish regenerate spinal cord tissue to reverse a paralyzing injury. His lab also introduced the concept of tissue regeneration enhancer elements (TREEs), sequences that regulate regeneration programs and can be engineered to enhance tissue regeneration, and later showed their application in gene therapy strategies for tissue repair.

=== Awards ===
Poss was a Helen Hay Whitney Foundation Postdoctoral Fellow, a Pew Scholar, and a Howard Hughes Medical Institute Early Career Scientist. He received the Established Investigator and Merit Awards from the American Heart Association, the Ruth and A. Morris Williams Faculty Research Prize from Duke University, and the Distinguished Achievement Award from Carleton College. In 2019, Poss was named a Fellow of the American Association for the Advancement of Science.

=== Selected articles, videos and interviews ===
- Wisconsin State Journal: Zebrafish may teach us to regrow our hearts
- MDI Biological Lab: Dr. Ken Poss discusses how zebrafish are playing an important role in understanding regeneration and heart disease.
- International Journal of Developmental Biology: Interview with Ken Poss
- The Economist: Rainbow's beginning
- AAAS: Do Zebrafish Hold an Ingredient to Heal Spinal Cord Injuries?
- Nature: Heart under construction
- Leica: Organ Regeneration: An Unlikely Fish Tale
