= John F. Rawls =

American developmental biologist

John Franklin Rawls is an American developmental biologist. He is an associate professor of molecular genetics and microbiology at Duke University and the director of the Duke Microbiome Center.

== Education ==
John Franklin Rawls completed an undergraduate degree at Emory University between 1992 and 1996. He earned a doctor of philosophy in developmental biology at Washington University in St. Louis in 2001. His dissertation was titled Genetic dissection of kit-dependent melanocyte development in zebrafish, Danio rerio. He was mentored under Stephen L. Johnson. Rawls completed a postdoctoral fellowship with Jeffrey I. Gordon from 2001 to 2006 at the Center for Genome Sciences at Washington University.

== Career ==
Rawls was a faculty member at University of North Carolina at Chapel Hill from 2006 to 2013. He later joined Duke University. He is a professor in the Department of Molecular Genetics and Microbiology. Rawls is the director of the Duke Microbiome Center.
