= Kevin D. Hoover =

American economist (born 1955)

Kevin Douglas Hoover
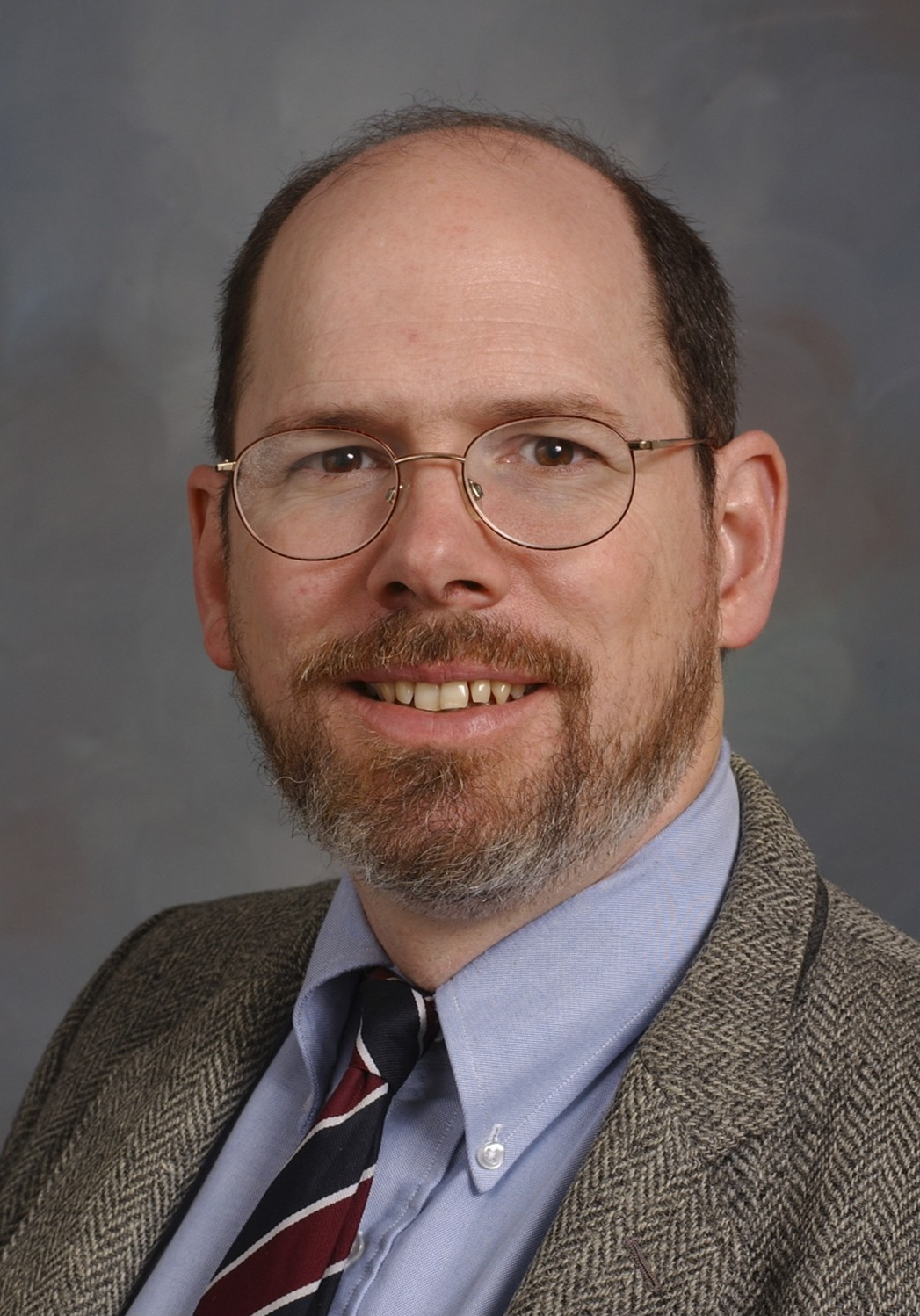
- Born: May 3, 1955 (age 71); Washington, D.C.
- Spouse: Catherine Whitney Hoover (m. 1978)

Academic background
- Education: Nuffield College, Oxford
- Doctoral advisor: Peter Oppenheimer

Academic work
- Discipline: Macroeconomics history of economic thought economic methodology
- Institutions: Duke University
- Website: Information at IDEAS / RePEc

Kevin Douglas Hoover (born May 3, 1955) is Professor of Economics and Philosophy and a Senior Fellow at the Center for the History of Political Economy at Duke University. He has previously held positions at the Federal Reserve Bank of San Francisco, University of Oxford (Balliol College, Nuffield College, and Lady Margaret Hall), and the University of California, Davis, where he served eight years as chair of the Economics Department. He is a former president of the History of Economics Society and chaired the International Network for Economic Method. He is a former editor of the Journal of Economic Methodology and the current editor of the History of Political Economy.

Hoover is most noted for his work in the history and methodology of macroeconomics, the philosophy of causation and empirical methods of causal inference applicable to macroeconomics, as well as to search methods in econometrics more generally. He has also made substantial contributions to the historical and philosophical research on pragmatism and its relevance to economics. His scholarly articles have appeared in American Economic Review, British Journal for the Philosophy of Science, and History of Political Economy, among others. He has also written and edited more than ten books in the history and philosophy of economics, including the New Classical Macroeconomics (1988) and Causality in Macroeconomics (2001), and Peirce's Science of Economics and Economics of Science (2026, with James Wible). His work has been recognized by various awards and grants, including the 2015 Craufurd Goodwin Best Article Prize for his "On the Reception of Haavelmo's Econometric Thought" (2015) and two National Science Foundation grants for his research on causality in economics.

== Selected publications ==
Books

- The New Classical Macroeconomics. Oxford: Blackwell. 1988.
- Causality in Macroeconomics. Cambridge: Cambridge University Press. 2001. ISBN 978-0521002882.
- Applied Intermediate Macroeconomics. Cambridge University Press. 2012.
- Peirce's Science of Economics and Economics of Science. Oxford University Press. 2026

Articles

- "Who Runs the AEA?" Journal of Economic Literature, 61(3), 1127–1171, 2023. https://doi.org/10.1257/jel.20221667. Coauthor: Andrej Svorenčík.
- "The Discovery of Long-Run Causal Order: A Preliminary Investigation," Econometrics 8(3), 31, 3 August 2020, pp. 1–25: https://doi.org/10.3390/econometrics8030031. Alternate link: https://https://www.mdpi.com/2225-1146/8/3/31
- "Reductionism in Economics: Intentionality and Eschatological Justification in the Microfoundations of Macroeconomics," Philosophy of Science 82(4), (October 2015), pp. 689–711.
- "The Ontological Status of Shocks and Trends in Macroeconomics," Synthese 192(3), 2015, pp. 3509–3532. doi:10.1007/s11229-014-0503-5
- "On the Reception of Haavelmo's Econometric Thought," Journal of the History of Economic Thought 36(1), March 2014, 45–65. (Winner of the History of Economics Society's Prize for the Best Article in History of Economic Thought, 2015.)
- "Microfoundational Programs," in Pedro Garcia Duarte and Gilberto Lima Tadeu, editors. Microfoundations Reconsidered: The Relationship of Micro and Macroeconomics in Historical Perspective Cheltenham: Edward Elgar, 2012, pp. 19–61.
- "Pragmatism, Perspectival Realism, and Econometrics," in Aki Lehtinen, Jaakko Kuorikoski and Petri Ylikoski, editors. Economics for Real: Uskali Mäki and the Place of Truth in Economics. London: Routledge, 2012, pp. 223–240.
- "Milton Friedman's Stance: The Methodology of Causal Realism," in Uskali Mäki, editor, The Methodology of Positive Economics: Milton Friedman's Essay Fifty Years Later. Cambridge: Cambridge University Press, 2009, pp. 303–320.
- "Truth and Robustness in Cross-country Growth Regressions," Oxford Bulletin of Economics and Statistics 66(5), 2004, pp. 765–798. Coauthor: Stephen J. Perez. Data Sets for this paper.
- "Lost Causes," Journal of the History of Economic Thought, 26(2), 2004, pp. 149–164.
- "Searching for the Causal Structure of a Vector Autoregression," Oxford Bulletin of Economics and Statistics 65(supplement), 2003, pp. 745–767. Coauthor: Selva Demiralp.
- "Three Attitudes towards Data-mining," Journal of Economic Methodology, vol. 7, no. 2, June 2000, pp. 195–210. (Abstract) Coauthor: Stephen J. Perez.
- "Data Mining Reconsidered: Encompassing and the General-to-Specific Approach to Specification Search," Econometrics Journal, vol. 2, no. 2, 1999, pp. 1–25. Coauthor: Stephen J. Perez. Data Set and Matlab Programs.
- "Econometrics as Observation: The Lucas Critique, Causality and the Nature of Econometric Inference," Journal of Economic Methodology, June 1994. Reprinted in Daniel M. Hausman, editor. The Philosophy of Economics, 3rd. ed. Cambridge: Cambridge University Press, 2008.
- "Causation, Spending, and Taxes: Sand in the Sandbox or Tax Collector for the Welfare State?" American Economic Review 82(1), March 1992, pp. 225–248. Coauthor: Steven Sheffrin.
- "Scientific Research Program or Tribe? A Joint Appraisal of Lakatos and the New Classical Macroeconomics," in Appraising Economic Theories: Studies in the Application of the Methodology of Research Programs, Mark Blaug and Neil de Marchi, editors. Aldershot: Edward Elgar, 1991.
- Hoover, Kevin D. (2008). "Clive W.J. Granger (1934– )". In Henderson, David R. (ed.). The Concise Encyclopedia of Economics. Library of Economics and Liberty (2nd ed.). Liberty Fund. pp. 536–37. ISBN 978-0865976665.
