= Linda Burton =

Sociologist

Linda M. Burton is a sociologist who is a former dean of the University of California, Berkeley School of Social Welfare. She previously held the title of James B. Duke Professor of Sociology and Director of the Sociology Department's Undergraduate Honors Program at Duke University. She specializes in family structure, poverty and inequality, and child development.

== Education ==
Burton received a B.S. in 1978, a M.A. in sociology in 1982, and a Ph.D. in 1985, all from the University of Southern California.

== Work ==
Linda M. Burton is the James B. Duke Professor of Sociology and Director of the Sociology Department's Undergraduate Honors Program at Duke University. She is the former Director of the NIMH-sponsored Research Consortium on Diversity, Family Processes, and Child Adolescent Mental Health, the Consortium's Multisite Postdoctoral Training Program, and the African American Mental Health Research Scientists Consortium. In addition, she has directed several programs that provide grantsmanship and ethnographic research methods training for pre-docs, post-docs, and faculty at Historically Black Colleges and Universities. She has also been an active mentor in the McNair Research Scholars Program for undergraduate minorities, the Mellon Mays undergraduate research program, and the Minority Access to Research Careers Program.

Recently, Dr. Burton directed the ethnographic component of Welfare, Children, and Families: A Three-City Study and is principal investigator of a multi-site team ethnographic study (Family Life Project) of poverty, family processes, and child development in six rural communities. Her research integrates ethnographic and demographic approaches and examines the roles that poverty and intergenerational family dynamics play in the intimate unions of low-income mothers and the life course transitions of children and adults in urban and rural families. She currently teaches a year-long course in ethnographic methods with Dr. Carol Stack as well as courses in poverty research and family sociology.

Effective July 1, 2014, Linda Burton was appointed dean of the Social Sciences Division within Trinity College of Arts & Sciences.

"As a James B. Duke Professor, Linda Burton brings an impressive scholarly record using ethnographic and demographic methods, and in administering multiple grants on a large-scale research project. She exemplifies Duke's commitment to interdisciplinarity through her integration of spatial, geographic, survey, and ethnographic methods," said Laurie Patton, dean of Arts & Sciences.

"Through her research focus on America's poorest urban, small town and rural families, she also exemplifies knowledge in service to society. Professor Burton is known for being relentlessly constructive in solving problems and in bringing different voices to the table."

== Awards ==
In 2014, Burton received the Distinguished Career Award from the Family section of the American Sociological Association for her research.

== Selected bibliography ==
=== Books ===
- Brady, D. and L.M. Burton (Eds.). (forthcoming) The Oxford Handbook of the Social Science of Poverty. NY: Oxford University Press
- Garrett-Peters, R. and L.M. Burton. (in press) Tenuous Ties: The Nature and Costs of Kin Support Among Low-Income Rural African American Mothers.
- Burton, L.M. R. Garrett-Peters and J. Easton. 2011. Morality, Identity, and Mental Health in Rural Ghettos. NY: Springer.

=== Chapters in books ===
- Burton, L.M. and C.B. Stack. 2014. "Breakfast at Elmo's: Adolescent Boys and Disruptive Politics in the Kinscripts Narrative." pp. 174–191 in A. Garey, R. Hertz, and M. Nelson (Eds.), Open to Disruption: Practicing Slow Sociology. Nashville, TN: Vanderbilt University Press.

=== Articles ===
- Burton, L.M. 2014. Seeking Romance in the Crosshairs of Multiple-Partner Fertility: Ethnographic Insights on Low-Income Urban and Rural Mothers. The Annals of the American Academy of Political and Social Science 654(1): 185–212.
- Burton, L.M., D.T. Lichter, R.S. Baker, and J.M. Eason. 2013. Inequality, Family Processes, and Health in the "New" Rural America. American Behavioral Scientist 57(8): 1128–1151.
