= NGC 7547 =

Galaxy in the constellation Pegasus

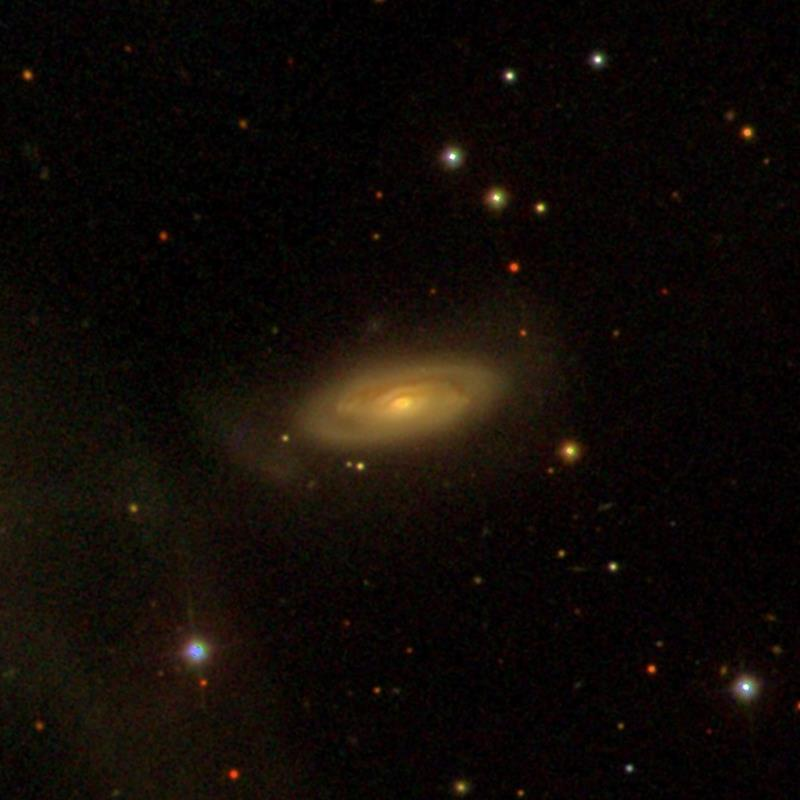

NGC 7547 is a spiral galaxy in the constellation Pegasus. It was discovered by the astronomer John Herschel on August 26, 1827.
