= Joseph J. Spengler =

American economist (1902–1991)

Joseph John Spengler (19 November 1902 – 2 January 1991) was an American economist, statistician, and historian of economic thought. A recipient of the 1951 John Frederick Lewis Award of the American Philosophical Society and the 1981 Distinguished Fellow Award from the History of Economics Society, he was Professor Emeritus of Economics at Duke University at the time of his death.

== Biography ==
Spengler was born in Piqua, Ohio. He graduated from the Piqua High School and initially studied journalism at college, but dropped out after his first year to become a crime reporter. A year later he returned to higher education, at first studying sociology and political science, but eventually gravitating to economics. He received his B.A., M.A., and PhD from Ohio State University, where his 1930 doctoral dissertation was a comparative study on the fertility rates of native-born and immigrant women in the United States. After a stint teaching at the University of Arizona he joined the faculty of Duke University in 1932, initially as a visiting professor, and became a permanent member of the faculty in 1934. He remained there until his retirement as the James B. Duke Professor of Economics in 1972. With Earl J. Hamilton, Spengler established the university's first graduate level program in Economic History as well as the History of Political Economy (HOPE) research group.

During World War II, he worked for the Office of Price Administration as the price executive for the Southeastern region of the United States and over the years held several other advisory posts to the US government and the United Nations. His interest in population studies and the demographic aspects of economics reflected in his doctoral dissertation, became a major focus of his research and writing throughout his career. His first book, France Faces Depopulation, published in 1938, examined the cultural and political causes of France's pre-World War II population decline, and one of his last major books was The Economics of Individual and Population Aging, published in 1980. In 1972, Duke University Press published a collection of his classic essays in the area: Population Economics: Selected Essays of Joseph J. Spengler.

Joseph Spengler died in Durham, North Carolina from Alzheimer's disease at the age of 88. He was survived by his wife, the former Dorothy Marie Kress. The couple married in 1927 and were co-authors of "Maintenance of Postwar Full Employment" (1944). Spengler's 1978 book, Facing Zero Population Growth: Reactions and Interpretations, Past and Present has the dedication:

To Dorothy Kress Spengler, my wife, companion, and co-worker for fifty years

Spengler was a member of both the American Philosophical Society (1954) and the American Academy of Arts and Sciences (1964). In 2004, the History of Economics Society established the annual Joseph J. Spengler Prize for the best book published on the history of economics.

== Selected publications of Joseph J. Spengler ==
- France Faces Depopulation. Duke Univ. Press. 1938. Archived from the original on 2012-11-02 – via Questia.
- 1950. "Vertical Integration and Antitrust Policy," Journal of Political Economy, 58(4), p p. 347-352 (from JSTOR).
- 1951. "The Population Obstacle to Economic Betterment," American Economic Review, 41(2), p p. 343-354.
- 1964. "Economic Thought of Islam: Ibn Khaldun," Comparative Studies in Society and History, 6(3), p p. 268-306.
- 1966. "Values and Fertility Analysis," Demography, 3(1), p p. 109-130.
- 1966. "The Economist and the Population Question," American Economic Review, 56(1/2), pp. 1–24
- 1971. Indian Economic Thought: A Preface to Its History. Duke University Press. ISBN 978-0-8223-0245-2.
- 1972. Population Economics: Selected Essays of Joseph J. Spengler, Robert S. Smith et al., ed. Duke Univ. Press. Review extract.
- 1980. Origins of Economic Thought and Justice, Southern Illinois University Press. 1st-page chapter links
- 1980. The Economics of Individual and Population Aging. With Robert L. Clark. Description & chapter-preview links on Google Books.

== Sources ==
- Cook, Joan, "Joseph Spengler, 88, Economics Professor At Duke University", New York Times, 3 January 1991.
- Cook, Robert Cecil (ed.), "Spengler, Joseph John", Who's Who in American Education: A Biographical Dictionary of Eminent Living Educators of the United States, Volume 8, 1938
- Durden, Robert Franklin, The Launching of Duke University, 1924-1949, Duke University Press, 1993. ISBN 0-8223-1302-2
- Kelley, Allen C., "Joseph J. Spengler (November 19, 1902-January 2, 1991)", Proceedings of the American Philosophical Society, Vol. 136, No. 1, (March 1992), pp. 142–147
- Silk, Leonard, "The Rich Legacy of an Economist", New York Times, 4 January 1991
- Spengler, Dorothy K. and Spengler, Joseph J, "Maintenance of Postwar Full Employment" in The Winning Plans in the Pabst Postwar Employment Awards, Pabst Brewing Company, 1944, pp. 79–83
- Spengler, Joseph J. Facing Zero Population Growth: Reactions and Interpretations, Past and Present, Duke University Press, 1978.

Further reading

- Blaug, Mark (ed.), "Spengler, Joseph L.", Who's Who in Economics (3d edition), E. Elgar, 1999. ISBN 1-85898-886-1
- Silk, Leonard, "The Economics of Joseph J. Spengler", Demography India, 14 (1), 1986, pp. 137–145
- Sobel, Irvin, "Joseph J. Spengler: The Institutionalist Approach to the History of Economics" in Research in the History of Economic Thought and Methodology, Vol.1, 1983, pp. 243–270.
