= History of Political Economy =

- Discipline: Economics
- Language: English
- Edited by: Kevin D. Hoover

Publication details
- History: 1969–present
- Publisher: Duke University Press (United States)
- Frequency: Quarterly
- Impact factor: 0.308 (2014)

Standard abbreviations
- ISO 4: Hist. Political Econ.

Indexing
- ISSN: 0018-2702 (print); 1527-1919 (web)
- LCCN: 11196499
- OCLC no.: 476296572

Links
- Journal homepage; Online access; Online archive

The History of Political Economy is a journal published by Duke University Press, focusing on economics and the history of economic thought and analysis.
