= Robotic Optical Transient Search Experiment =

Astronomical observatory in Texas, US

Coordinates: 35°52′52″N 106°40′29″W

The Robotic Optical Transient Search Experiment (ROTSE) is a multi-telescope experiment designed to observe the optical afterglow of gamma-ray bursts. The experiment currently consists of four telescopes located in Australia, Namibia, Turkey, and at the McDonald Observatory near Fort Davis, Texas.

The Namibian telescope is located at the High Energy Stereoscopic System site in the Gamsberg mountains south-west of the capital Windhoek.

The ROTSE project is a collaboration of astrophysicists from the University of Michigan, Los Alamos National Laboratory, Lawrence Livermore National Laboratory, the University of New South Wales (Australia) and the Max Planck Institute for Nuclear Physics (Germany).

The original ROTSE-I had four telephoto lenses of 11 cm aperture, covering a 16x16 degree field of view. This detected the first afterglow of a GRB while the burst was still ongoing, but this was the only burst detected by ROTSE or the very similar Livermore Optical Transient Imaging System. Therefore, ROTSE-II was designed, also featuring a large field of view, but it was never built, since new satellites such as HETE-2 and SWIFT could provide smaller error boxes, making a huge field of view unnecessary. This led to the design of ROTSE-III, a more or less conventional telescope designed for fast slewing and operation at multiple locations around the world.

== See also ==
- Livermore Optical Transient Imaging System
- List of astronomical observatories
