= Flâneur =

Idler or man of leisure

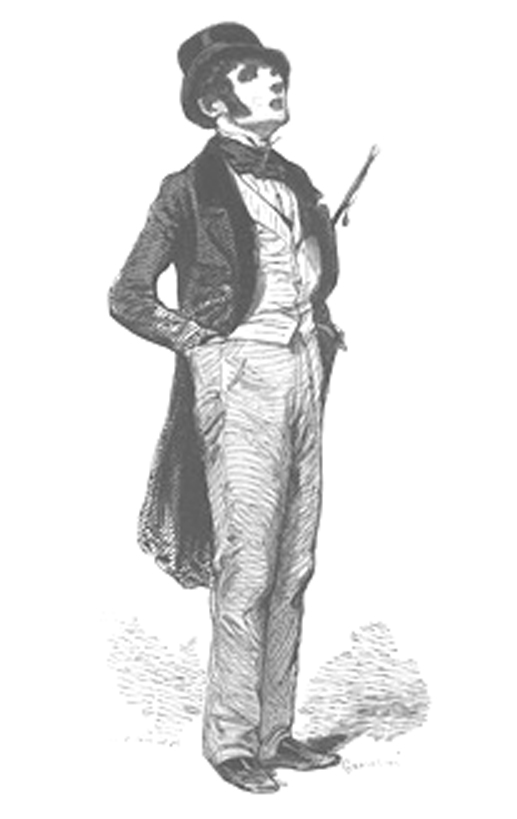
Paul Gavarni, Le Flâneur, 1842

A flâneur (French: [flɑnœʁ], translating as "saunterer" or "loafer") is a type of urban walker who wanders while observing society around them. This French term was popularized in the 19th century and has some nuanced additional meanings, including as a loanword into various languages, including English. Traditionally depicted as male, a flâneur is an ambivalent figure of urban affluence and modernity, representing the ability to wander detached from society, for an entertainment from the observation of the urban life. Flânerie is the act of strolling, with all of its accompanying associations. A near-synonym of the noun is boulevardier.

The flâneur was first a literary type from 19th-century France, essential to any picture of the streets of Paris. The word carried a set of rich associations: the man of leisure, the idler, the urban explorer, the connoisseur of the street. Drawing on the work of Charles Baudelaire who described the flâneur in his poetry and 1863 essay "The Painter of Modern Life", Walter Benjamin promoted 20th-century scholarly interest in the flâneur as an emblematic archetype of urban, modern (even modernist) experience. Following Benjamin, the flâneur has become an important symbol for scholars, artists, and writers. The classic French female counterpart is the passante, dating to the works of Marcel Proust, though a 21st-century academic coinage is flâneuse, and some English-language writers simply apply the masculine flâneur also to women. The term has acquired an additional architecture and urban planning sense, referring to passers-by who experience incidental or intentional psychological effects from the design of a structure.

== Etymology ==
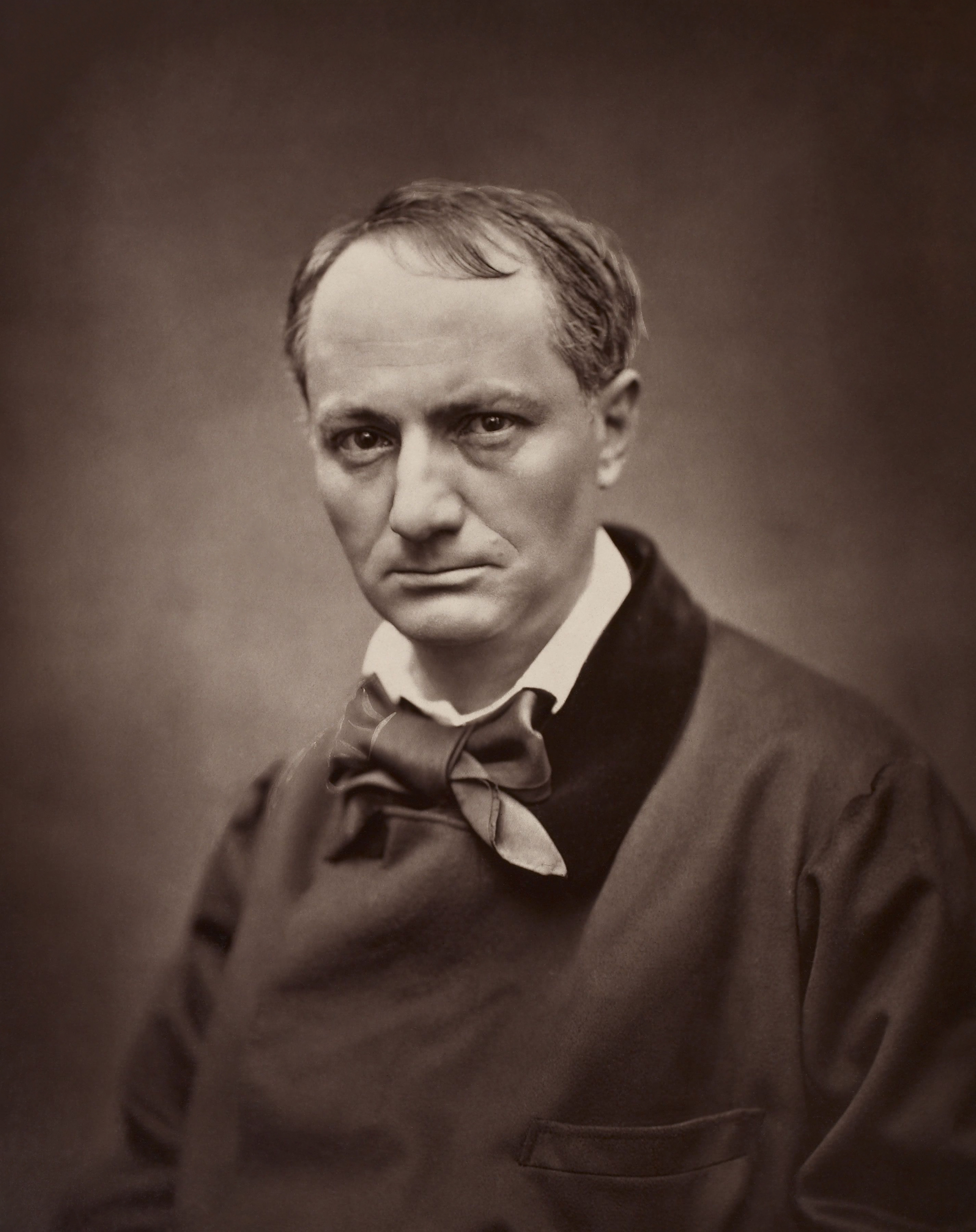
Charles Baudelaire

Flâneur derives from the Old Norse verb flana, "to wander with no purpose".

The terms of flânerie date to the 16th or 17th century, denoting strolling, idling, often with the connotation of wasting time. But it was in the 19th century that a rich set of meanings and definitions surrounding the flâneur took shape.

The flâneur was defined in 1872 in a long article in Pierre Larousse's Grand dictionnaire universel du XIXe siècle. It described the flâneur in ambivalent terms, equal parts curiosity and laziness, and presented a taxonomy of flânerie: flâneurs of the boulevards, of parks, of the arcades, of cafés; mindless flâneurs and intelligent ones.

By then, the term had already developed a rich set of associations. Sainte-Beuve wrote that to flâne "is the very opposite of doing nothing". Honoré de Balzac described flânerie as "the gastronomy of the eye". Anaïs Bazin wrote that "the only, the true sovereign of Paris is the flâneur". Victor Fournel, in Ce qu'on voit dans les rues de Paris (What One Sees in the Streets of Paris, 1867), devoted a chapter to "the art of flânerie". For Fournel, there was nothing lazy in flânerie. It was, rather, a way of understanding the rich variety of the city landscape; it was like "a mobile and passionate photograph" ("un daguerréotype mobile et passioné") of urban experience.

With Edgar Allan Poe's short story "The Man of the Crowd", the flâneur entered the literary scene. Charles Baudelaire discusses "The Man of the Crowd" in "The Painter of Modern Life"; it would go on to become a key example in Walter Benjamin's essay "On Some Motifs in Baudelaire", which theorizes the role of the crowd in modernity. In the 1860s, in the midst of the rebuilding of Paris under Napoleon III and the Baron Haussmann, Charles Baudelaire presented a memorable portrait of the flâneur as the artist-poet of the modern metropolis:

The crowd is his element, as the air is that of birds and water of fishes. His passion and his profession are to become one flesh with the crowd. For the perfect flâneur, for the passionate spectator, it is an immense joy to set up house in the heart of the multitude, amid the ebb and flow of movement, in the midst of the fugitive and the infinite. To be away from home and yet to feel oneself everywhere at home; to see the world, to be at the centre of the world, and yet to remain hidden from the world—impartial natures which the tongue can but clumsily define. The spectator is a prince who everywhere rejoices in his incognito. The lover of life makes the whole world his family, just like the lover of the fair sex who builds up his family from all the beautiful women that he has ever found, or that are or are not—to be found; or the lover of pictures who lives in a magical society of dreams painted on canvas. Thus, the lover of universal life enters into the crowd as though it were an immense reservoir of electrical energy. Or we might liken him to a mirror as vast as the crowd itself; or to a kaleidoscope gifted with consciousness, responding to each one of its movements and reproducing the multiplicity of life and the flickering grace of all the elements of life.

But Baudelaire's association of the flâneur with artists and the world of art has been questioned.

Drawing on Fournel, and on his analysis of the poetry of Baudelaire, Walter Benjamin described the flâneur as the essential figure of the modern urban spectator, an amateur detective and investigator of the city. More than this, his flâneur was a sign of the alienation of the city. For Benjamin, the flâneur met his demise with the triumph of consumer capitalism.

In these texts, the flâneur was often juxtaposed and contrasted with the figure of the badaud, the gawker or gaper. Fournel wrote: "The flâneur must not be confused with the badaud; a nuance should be observed there .... The simple flâneur is always in full possession of his individuality, whereas the individuality of the badaud disappears. It is absorbed by the outside world ... which intoxicates him to the point where he forgets himself. Under the influence of the spectacle which presents itself to him, the badaud becomes an impersonal creature; he is no longer a human being, he is part of the public, of the crowd."

In the decades since Benjamin, the flâneur has been the subject of a number of appropriations and interpretations. The figure of the flâneur has been used—among other things – to explain modern, urban experience, spectatorship, the class tensions and gender divisions of the nineteenth-century city, to describe modern alienation, to clarify the sources of mass culture and the postmodern spectatorial gaze while serving as a source of inspiration to writers and artists.

== Female counterparts ==
The historical feminine rough equivalent of the flâneur, the passante (French for 'walker', 'passer-by'), appears prominently in the work of Marcel Proust. He portrayed several of his female characters as elusive, passing figures, who tended to ignore his obsessive (and at times possessive) view of them. Increasing freedoms and social innovations such as industrialization later allowed the passante to become an active participant in the 19th century metropolis, as women's social roles expanded away from the domestic and the private, into the public and urban spheres.

Twenty-first-century literary criticism and gender studies scholarship has proposed flâneuse for the female equivalent of the flâneur, with some additional feminist re-analysis. This proposal derives from the argument that women conceived and experienced public space differently from men in modern cities. Janet Wolff, in The Invisible Flâneuse: Women and the Literature of Modernity (1985), argues that the female figure of the flâneuse is absent in the literature of modernity, because public space had been gendered in modernity, leading, in turn, women's exclusion from public spaces to domestic spaces and suburbs. Elizabeth Wilson, on the other hand, in The Sphinx in the City: Urban Life, the Control of Disorder, and Women (1991), points out women's diverse experiences in public space in the modern metropolises such as London, Paris, Vienna, Berlin, discussing how the modern city was conceived as a place of freedom, autonomy, and pleasure, and how women experienced these spaces. Linda McDowell, in Gender, Identity and Place: Understanding Feminist Geographies (1999), expands this understanding to explain how public space was not experienced as a homogeneous and fixed space, and how women used particular public spaces such as beaches, cafés, and shopping malls to experience this autonomy. Departing from Wilson's approach, Lauren Elkin's Flâneuse: Women Walk the City in Paris, New York, Tokyo, Venice, and London (2017) traces a number of flâneuses in history, such as Agnès Varda, Sophie Calle, Virginia Woolf, Martha Gellhorn, focusing on their particular relationships with particular cities. The sound artist and scholar, Amanda Gutierrez, explores the Spanish term "Caminata" as a potential gendered alternative for Flâneur/Flâneuse, but still finds it wanting, as it fails to acknowledge the continued vulnerability of women and gender nonconforming people in public space.

In less academic contexts, such as newspaper book reviews, the grammatically masculine flâneur is also applied to women (including modern ones) in essentially the same senses as for the original male referents, at least in English-language borrowings of the term. These feminist scholars have argued that the word 'flâneuse' implies women's distinctive modalities of conceiving, interacting, occupying, and experiencing space.

== Urban life ==
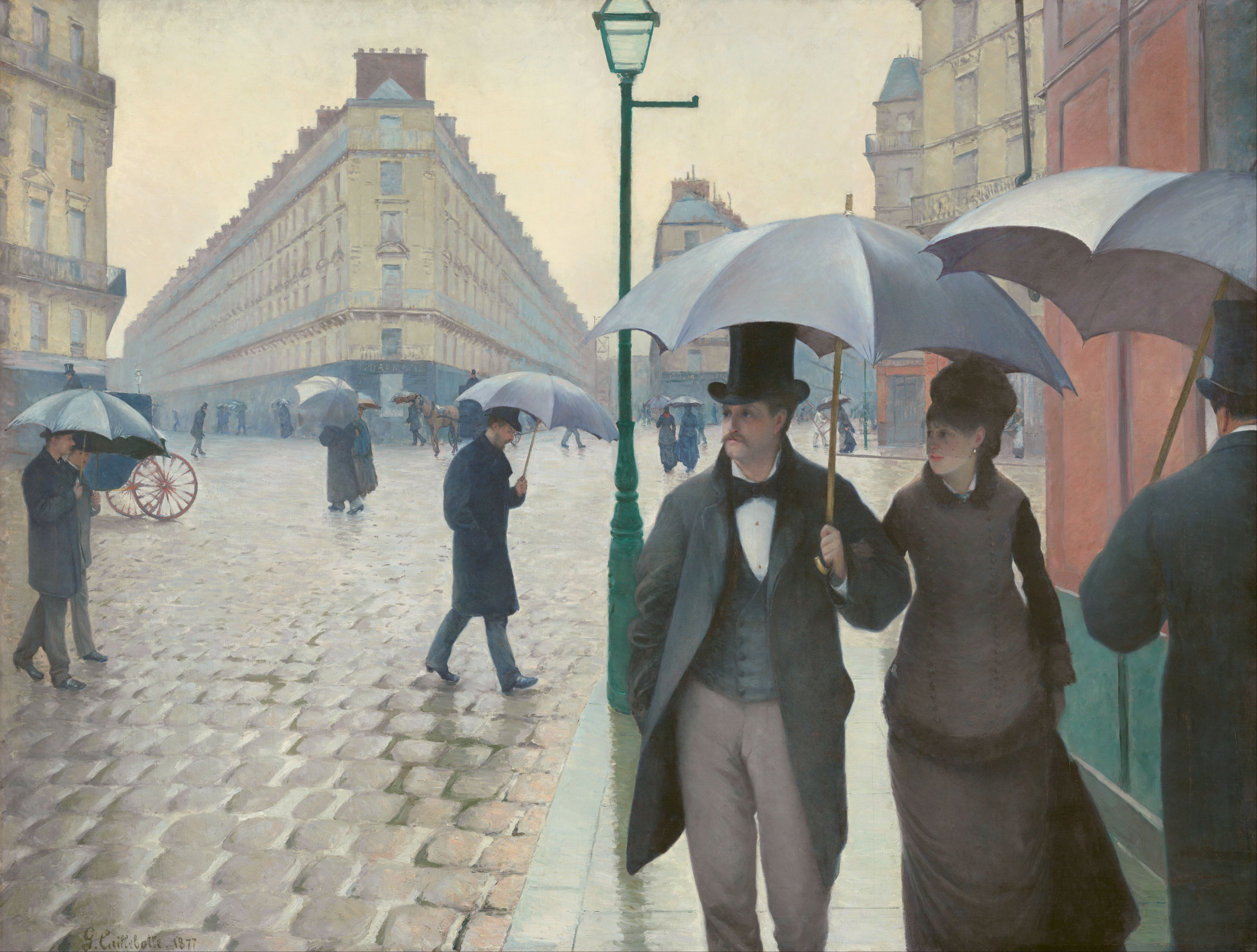
Gustave Caillebotte. Paris Street, Rainy Day, 1877. Art Institute of Chicago.

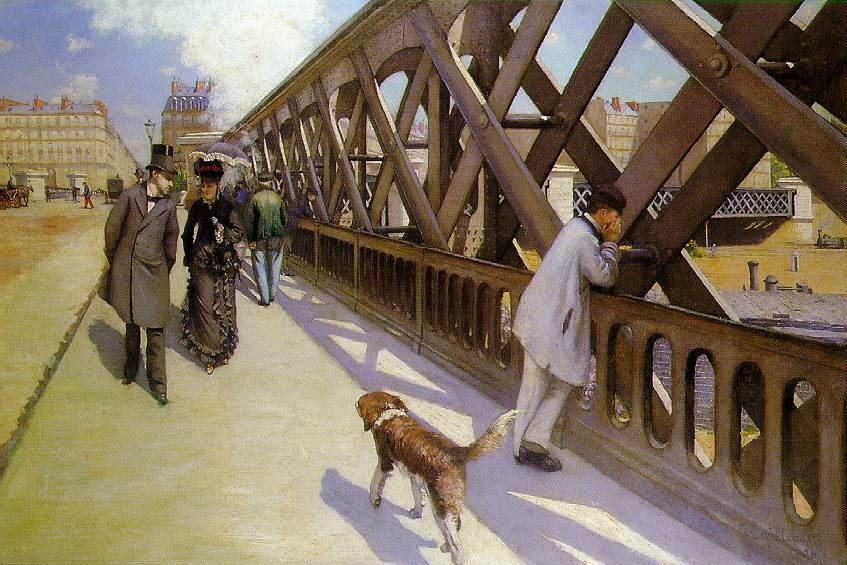
Gustave Caillebotte, Le Pont de l'Europe, oil on canvas, 1876. Musée du Petit Palais, Geneva.

While Baudelaire characterized the flâneur as a "gentleman stroller of city streets", he saw him as having a key role in understanding, participating in, and portraying the city. A flâneur thus played a double role in city life and in theory, that is, while remaining a detached observer. This stance, simultaneously part of and apart from, combines sociological, anthropological, literary, and historical notions of the relationship between the individual and the greater populace.

In the period after the French Revolution of 1848, during which the Empire was reestablished with clearly bourgeois pretensions of "order" and "morals", Baudelaire began asserting that traditional art was inadequate for the new dynamic complications of modern life. Social and economic changes brought by industrialization demanded that the artist immerse himself in the metropolis and become, in Baudelaire's phrase, "a botanist of the sidewalk". David Harvey asserts that "Baudelaire would be torn the rest of his life between the stances of flâneur and dandy, a disengaged and cynical voyeur on the one hand, and man of the people who enters into the life of his subjects with passion on the other".

The observer–participant dialectic is evidenced in part by the dandy culture. Highly self-aware, and to a certain degree flamboyant and theatrical, dandies of the mid-nineteenth century created scenes through self-consciously outrageous acts like walking turtles on leashes down the streets of Paris. Such acts exemplify a flâneur's active participation in and fascination with street life while displaying a critical attitude towards the uniformity, speed, and anonymity of modern life in the city.

The concept of the flâneur is important in academic discussions of the phenomenon of modernity. While Baudelaire's aesthetic and critical visions helped open up the modern city as a space for investigation, theorists such as Georg Simmel began to codify the urban experience in more sociological and psychological terms. In his essay "The Metropolis and Mental Life", Simmel theorized that the complexities of the modern city create new social bonds and new attitudes towards others. The modern city was transforming humans, giving them a new relationship to time and space, inculcating in them a "blasé attitude", and altering fundamental notions of freedom and being:

The deepest problems of modern life derive from the claim of the individual to preserve the autonomy and individuality of his existence in the face of overwhelming social forces, of historical heritage, of external culture, and of the technique of life. The fight with nature which primitive man has to wage for his bodily existence attains in this modern form its latest transformation. The eighteenth century called upon man to free himself of all the historical bonds in the state and in religion, in morals and in economics. Man's nature, originally good and common to all, should develop unhampered. In addition to more liberty, the nineteenth century demanded the functional specialization of man and his work; this specialization makes one individual incomparable to another, and each of them indispensable to the highest possible extent. This specialization makes each man more directly dependent upon the supplementary activities of all others. Nietzsche sees the full development of the individual conditioned by the most ruthless struggle of individuals; socialism believes in the suppression of all competition for the same reason. Be that as it may, in all these positions the same basic motive is at work: the person resists being leveled down and worn out by a social-technological mechanism. An inquiry into the inner meaning of specifically modern life and its products, into the soul of the cultural body, so to speak, must seek to solve the equation which structures like the metropolis set up between the individual and the super-individual contents of life.

In 1917, the Swiss writer Robert Walser published a novella called The Walk (German: Der Spaziergang), a veritable outcome of the flâneur literature.

Walter Benjamin adopted the concept of the urban observer both as an analytical tool and as a lifestyle. From his Marxist standpoint, Benjamin describes the flâneur as a product of modern life and the Industrial Revolution without precedent, a parallel to the advent of the tourist. His flâneur is an uninvolved but highly perceptive bourgeois dilettante. Benjamin became his own prime example, making social and aesthetic observations during long walks through Paris. Even the title of his unfinished Arcades Project comes from his affection for covered shopping streets.

The crowd was the veil from behind which the familiar city as phantasmagoria beckoned to the flâneur. In it, the city was now landscape, now a room. And both of these went into the construction of the department store, which made use of flânerie itself in order to sell goods. The department store was the flâneur's final coup. As flâneurs, the intelligentsia came into the market place. As they thought, to observe it – but in reality it was already to find a buyer. In this intermediary stage ... they took the form of the bohème. To the uncertainty of their economic position corresponded the uncertainty of their political function.

Writing in 1962, Cornelia Otis Skinner suggested that there was no English equivalent of the term: "there is no Anglo-Saxon counterpart of that essentially Gallic individual, the deliberately aimless pedestrian, unencumbered by any obligation or sense of urgency, who, being French and therefore frugal, wastes nothing, including his time which he spends with the leisurely discrimination of a gourmet, savoring the multiple flavors of his city."

== Photography ==
The flâneur's tendency toward detached but aesthetically attuned observation has brought the term into the literature of photography, particularly street photography. The street photographer is seen as one modern extension of the urban observer described by nineteenth century journalist Victor Fournel before the advent of the hand-held camera:

This man is a roving and impassioned daguerreotype that preserves the least traces, and on which are reproduced, with their changing reflections, the course of things, the movement of the city, the multiple physiognomy of the public spirit, the confessions, antipathies, and admirations of the crowd.

An application of flâneur to street photography comes from Susan Sontag in her 1977 collection of essays, On Photography. She describes how, since the development of hand-held cameras in the early 20th century, the camera has become the tool of the flâneur:

The photographer is an armed version of the solitary walker reconnoitering, stalking, cruising the urban inferno, the voyeuristic stroller who discovers the city as a landscape of voluptuous extremes. Adept of the joys of watching, connoisseur of empathy, the flâneur finds the world "picturesque."

== Other uses ==
The flâneur concept is not limited to someone committing the physical act of a peripatetic stroll in the Baudelairian sense, but can also include a "complete philosophical way of living and thinking", and a process of navigating erudition as described by Nassim Nicholas Taleb's essay "Why I Do All This Walking, or How Systems Become Fragile". Taleb further set this term with a positive connotation referring to anyone pursuing open, flexible plans, in opposition to the negative "touristification", which he defines as the pursuit of an overly orderly plan. Louis Menand, in seeking to describe the poet T. S. Eliot's relationship to English literary society and his role in the formation of modernism, describes Eliot as a flâneur. Moreover, in one of Eliot's well-known poems, "The Lovesong of J. Alfred Prufrock", the protagonist takes the reader for a journey through his city in the manner of a flâneur.

Using the term more critically, in "De Profundis", Oscar Wilde wrote from prison about his life regrets, stating: "I let myself be lured into long spells of senseless and sensual ease. I amused myself with being a flaneur, a dandy, a man of fashion. I surrounded myself with the smaller natures and the meaner minds."

== See also ==
- Aestheticism
- Decadent movement
- Dérive
- The Idler
- People-watching

== Bibliography ==
- Fournel, Victor (1867). Ce qu'on voit dans les rues de Paris. p. 268 – via Bibliothèque nationale de France.
- Benjamin, Walter (1999). Eiland, Howard; Tiedemann, Rolf (eds.). Arcades Project. Translated by McLaughlin, Kevin.
- Benjamin, Walter (2006). Jennings, Michael (ed.). The Writer of Modern Life: Essays on Charles Baudelaire. Translated by Eiland, Howard; Jephcott, Edmund; Livingstone, Rodney; Zohn, Harry.
- Brand, Dana (1991). The Spectator and the City in Nineteenth-century American Literature. Cambridge University Press. ISBN 978-0-521-36207-8. This book argues that there were also flâneurs, in the original sense, in 19th-century American cities.
- Buck-Morss, Susan (1989). The Dialectics of Seeing: Walter Benjamin and the Arcades Project. Cambridge, Massachusetts.
- Buck-Morss, Susan (1986). "The Flâneur, the Sandwichman and the Whore: The Politics of Loitering". New German Critique. 39 (39): 99–140. doi:10.2307/488122. JSTOR 488122.
- Castigliano, Federico (2017). Flâneur: The Art of Wandering the Streets of Paris. CreateSpace Independent Publishing Platform. ISBN 978-1546942092.
- Castigliano, Federico (2022). Flaneuring the buyosphere: A comparative historical analysis of shopping environments and phantasmagorias. Journal of Consumer Culture, 14695405221111454
- Charney, Leo; Schwartz, Vanessa, eds. (1995). Cinema and the Invention of Modern Life. Berkeley.
- Friedberg, Anne (1993). Windowshopping: Cinema and the Postmodern. Berkeley.
- Harvey, David (2003). Paris: Capital of Modernity. New York: Routledge.
- Parkhurst Ferguson, Priscilla (1994). "The Flâneur: The City and Its Discontents". Paris as Revolution: Writing the Nineteenth-century City. Berkeley.
- Huart, Louis (1841). Physiologie du flâneur (in French). Paris – via Bibliothèque nationale de France.
- Shaya, Gregory (2004). "The Flâneur, the Badaud, and the Making of a Mass Public in France, circa 1860–1910". The American Historical Review. 109 (1): 41–77. doi:10.1086/ahr/109.1.41. Archived from the original on September 13, 2006.
- Simmel, Georg (1950). "The Metropolis and Mental Life". In Weinstein, D. (ed.). The Sociology of Georg Simmel. Translated by Wolff, Kurt. New York: Free Press. pp. 409–424.
- Tester, Keith, ed. (1994). The Flâneur. London. ISBN 9780415089128.
- Werner, James V. (2004). American Flaneur: The Cosmic Physiognomy of Edgar Allan Poe. Studies in Major Literary Authors Series. Archived from the original on January 2, 2005.
- White, Edmund (2001). The Flâneur: A Stroll Through the Paradoxes of Paris. Bloomsbury. ISBN 978-1582341354.
- Wilson, Elizabeth (1992). "The Invisible Flâneur". New Left Review. Vol. I, no. 191.
