= Badaud =

French term for gawker or bystander

The badaud is an important urban type from 18th and 19th-century French literature, one that has been adapted to explain aspects of mass culture and modern experience.

The term badaud (plural: badauds) comes from the French and has the basic meaning of "gawker", or more neutrally, "bystander". The term usually carries the connotation of idle curiosity, gullibility, simpleminded foolishness and gaping ignorance. It was an old inheritance, but was elaborated as an urban type in the eighteenth and nineteenth century to describe the street crowds that were an essential feature of the Parisian landscape. Like the flâneur, to which it has been frequently contrasted, the badaud has been construed as an emblematic figure of the modern, urban experience and of mass culture. The term badauderie (though not frequently used) refers to the act of gathering in a street crowd or gawking.

== Origins and definition ==
Badaud was in usage from the 16th century, if not earlier, a French adaptation of the old Provençal "badau". From the beginning the term described frivolous curiosity and ignorance. The Grand dictionnaire universel du XIXe siècle (1867) defined the term in this way: "The badaud is curious; he is astonished by everything he sees; he believes everything he hears, and he shows his contentment or his surprise by his open, gaping mouth." The term came frequently to describe the crowds that gathered in the street at any remarkable sight. From the 17th century and after, the term was associated with Parisians. It is most frequently rendered in English as "gawker" or "bystander".

== Various explanations of the concept ==
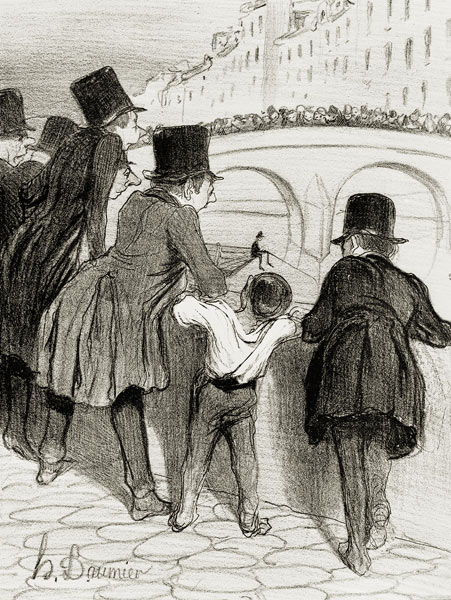
Honoré Daumier, Les Badauds, 1839

Antoine Furetière's Dictionnaire universel of 1690 defined the term and noted its association with Parisians. "It is an insulting nickname that has been given to the inhabitants of Paris, for they gather and amuse themselves to see and admire everything they find in their path, provided that it seems out of the ordinary".

Half a century later, Voltaire wrote: "If the people of Paris are most readily described as badauds, it is only because there are more people in Paris than elsewhere, and consequently more useless people. They gather at the first unfamiliar sight, to contemplate a charlatan, or two women of the people arguing, or a driver whose cart has overturned... There are badauds everywhere, but the first place has been given to those of Paris."

Louis-Sébastien Mercier (in 1782) noted that Parisians were often described as "perfect badauds," enraptured by any strange sight. He described a wide variety of crowds in the city of Paris.

An early nineteenth-century observer of the city, Victor-Joseph Étienne de Jouy, described badauderie as the one ineffable trait of the Parisian character. "In Paris, everything becomes an event: a train of wood being floated down the river, two coaches running into each other, a man dressed differently from others, an armored car, a dog fight, if they are noticed by two people, there will soon be a thousand, and the crowd will always grow, until some other circumstance, just as remarkable, pulls it away."

The Grand dictionnaire universel du XIXe siècle (1867) shows the badaud at work. "One is constantly jostled by a crowd of individuals who leave their houses each morning to kill time in city squares, intersections and on the boulevards; they have ten hours to dispose of, and when they return home in the evening, they want to have something to recount: an accident, a poor devil who falls from a bus into the street or faints from hunger, an old dog drowned in the Seine, etc., etc.; and when one of these Tituses of the pavement has seen nothing, observed nothing, he cries: I have lost my day!" This misfortune, we are told, rarely happens. "For when the street has nothing to offer, the badaud always can rely on the Morgue, the Jardin des Plantes, the Père Lachaise Cemetery, and in a last resort, there are the street performers of the place de la Bastille, or the puppeteers of the Champs-Elysées."

In his drawings and engravings from the 1890s, Félix Vallotton presented a taxonomy of Parisian street crowds, demonstrators, pedestrians, and bystanders.

== The badaud and the flâneur ==
The badaud was often contrasted with the flâneur. Auguste de Lacroix, Les Français peints par eux-mêmes (The French Described By Themselves, 1842) explained: "The flâneur is to the badaud what the gourmet is to the glutton... The badaud walks for the sake of walking, is amused with everything, is captivated by everything indistinctly, laughs without reason and gazes without seeing."

Victor Fournel, in Ce qu'on voit dans les rues de Paris (What One Sees in the Streets of Paris, 1867), made the distinction perfectly clear. "The flâneur must not be confused with the badaud; a nuance should be observed here. […] The simple flâneur […] is always in full possession of his individuality. By contrast, the individuality of the badaud disappears, absorbed by the outside world, which ravishes him, which moves him to drunkenness and ecstasy. Under the influence of the spectacle that presents itself to him, the badaud becomes an impersonal creature; he is no longer a man, he is the public, he is the crowd.

Walter Benjamin (following Fournel) contrasted the two figures: "In the flâneur, the joy of watching is triumphant. It can concentrate on observation; the result is the amateur detective. Or it can stagnate in the gaper; then the flâneur has turned into the badaud."

== See also ==
- Flâneur
- Rubbernecking
- Voyeur

== Bibliography ==
- Walter Benjamin, The Arcades Project, Rolf Tiedemann, ed., Howard Eiland and Kevin McLaughlin, trans. (1999).
- Walter Benjamin, The Writer of Modern Life: Essays on Charles Baudelaire, Michael Jennings, ed., Howard Eiland, Edmund Jephcott, Rodney Livingstone, and Harry Zohn, trans. (2006).
- Christophe Gaubert, “Badauds, manifestants, casseurs. Formes de sociabilité, éthos de virilité et usages des manifestations," Sociétés contemporaines 12:21 (1995)
- Louis Huart, Physiologie du flâneur, (Paris, 1841).
- Gregory Shaya, "The Flâneur, the Badaud, and the Making of a Mass Public in France, circa 1860–1910," American Historical Review 109 (2004).
- Félix Vallotton et al, Badauderies parisiennes. Les Rassemblements. Physiologie de la rue, (Paris, 1896)
- A.K. Wettlaufer, "Paradise Regained: The Flâneur, the Badaud, and the aesthetics of Artistic Reception in Le Poème du Haschisch," Nineteenth-Century French Studies, 24:3-4 (1996).
