= Arcades Project =

Unfinished book by Walter Benjamin

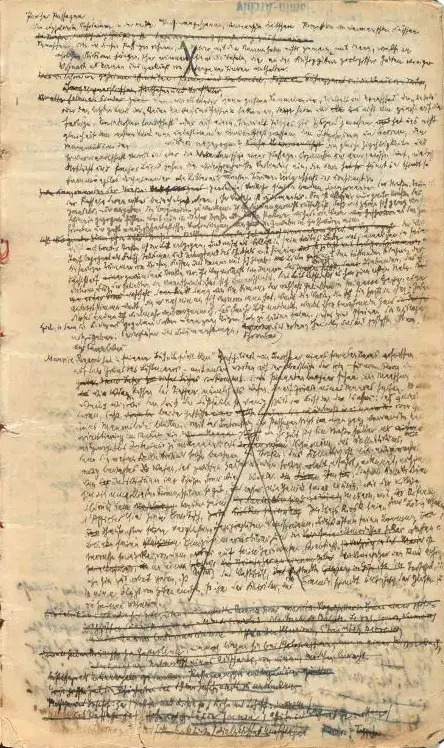
Manuscript of Das Passagen-Werk

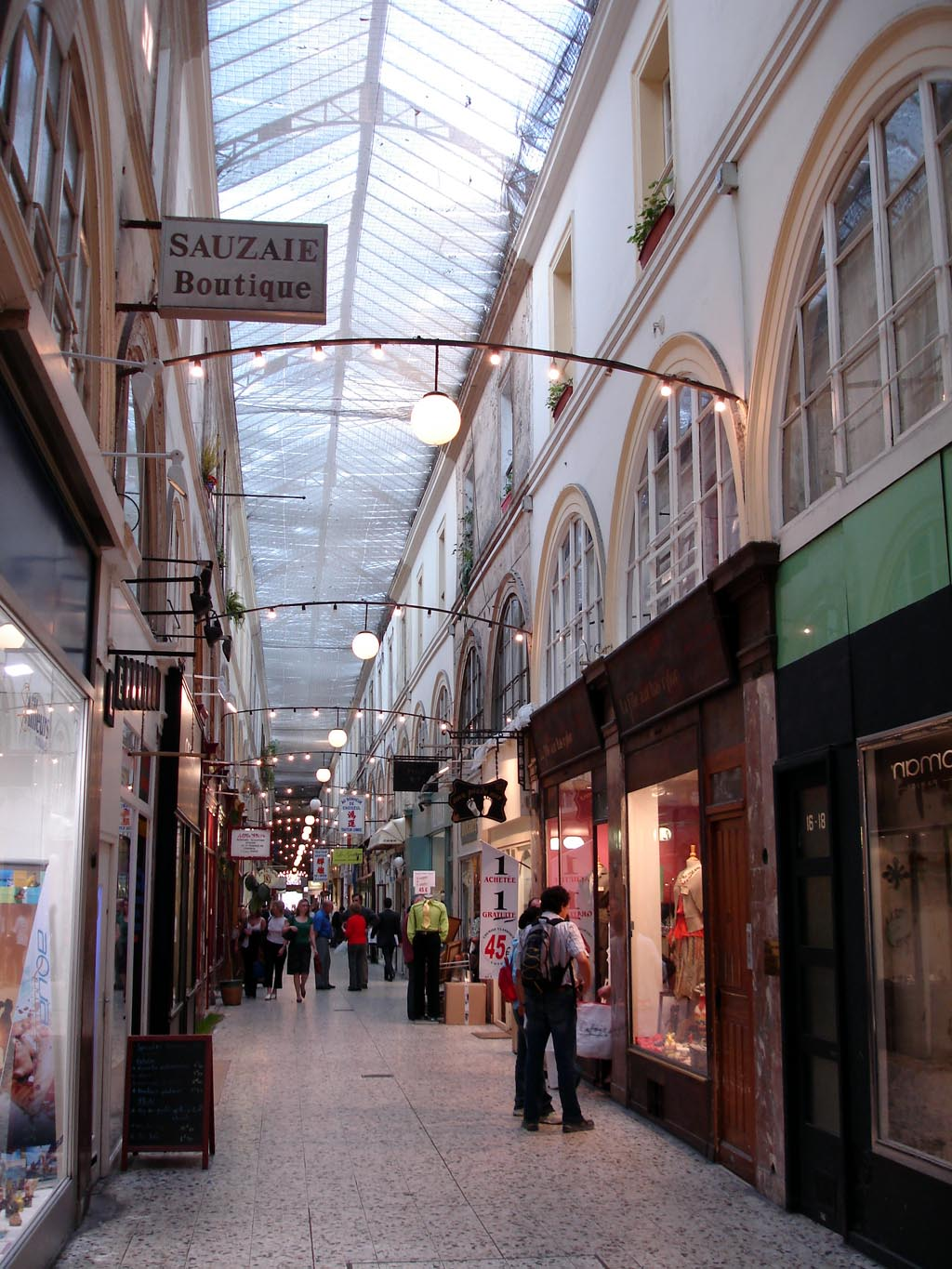
View of an arcade (the passage Choiseul, located in the second arrondissement of Paris), as an example of the characteristic architecture of the covered arcades of 19th-century Paris

Das Passagen-Werk or Arcades Project was an unfinished project of German philosopher and cultural critic Walter Benjamin, written between 1927 and his death in 1940. An enormous collection of writings on the city life of Paris in the 19th century, it was especially concerned with Paris's iron-and-glass covered "arcades".

Benjamin's Project, which many scholars believe might have become one of the great texts of 20th-century cultural criticism, was never completed due to his suicide on the French-Spanish border in 1940. The Arcades Project has been posthumously edited and published in many languages as a collection of unfinished reflections. The work is mainly written in German, yet also contains French-language passages, mainly quotes.

== Overview ==
Parisian arcades began to be constructed around the beginning of the nineteenth century and were sometimes destroyed as a result of Baron Haussmann's renovation of Paris during the Second French Empire (ca. 1850–1870). Benjamin linked them to the city's distinctive street life and saw them as providing one of the habitats of the flâneur (i.e., a person strolling in a locale to experience it).

Benjamin first mentioned the Arcades Project in a 1927 letter to his friend Gershom Scholem, describing it as his attempt to use collage techniques in literature. Initially, Benjamin saw the Arcades as a small article he would finish within a few weeks.

However, Benjamin's vision of the Arcades Project grew increasingly ambitious in scope until he perceived it as representing his most important creative accomplishment. On several occasions Benjamin altered his overall scheme of the Arcades Project, due in part to the influence of Theodor Adorno, who gave Benjamin a stipend and who expected Benjamin to make the Arcades project more explicitly political and Marxist in its analysis.

It contains sections (convolutes) on arcades, fashion, catacombs, iron constructions, exhibitions, advertising, interior design, Baudelaire, the streets of Paris, panoramas and dioramas, mirrors, painting, modes of lighting, railroads, Charles Fourier, Marx, photography, mannequins, social movements, Daumier's caricatures, literary history, the stock exchange, lithography, and the Paris Commune.

It influenced Marshal McLuhan's studies in media theory.

== Structure ==
The project's structure is idiosyncratic. The convolutes correspond to letters of the alphabet; the individual sections of text— sometimes individual lines, sometimes multi-paragraph analyses —are ordered with square brackets, starting from [A1,1]. This numbering system comes from the pieces of folded paper that Benjamin wrote on, with [A1a,1] denoting the third page of his 'folio'. Additionally, Benjamin included cross-references at the end of some sections. These were denoted by small boxes enclosing the word (e.g., ■ Fashion ■).

The sections of text are at times Benjamin's own thoughts, and at other times consecutive quotations. These two types of textual sections are differentiated in their typography, with a large typeface for his writing and a smaller one for citations. This convention comes from the German version but has no basis in Benjamin's manuscript. The convolutes also make extensive use of epigraphs from obscure publications.

== Publication history ==
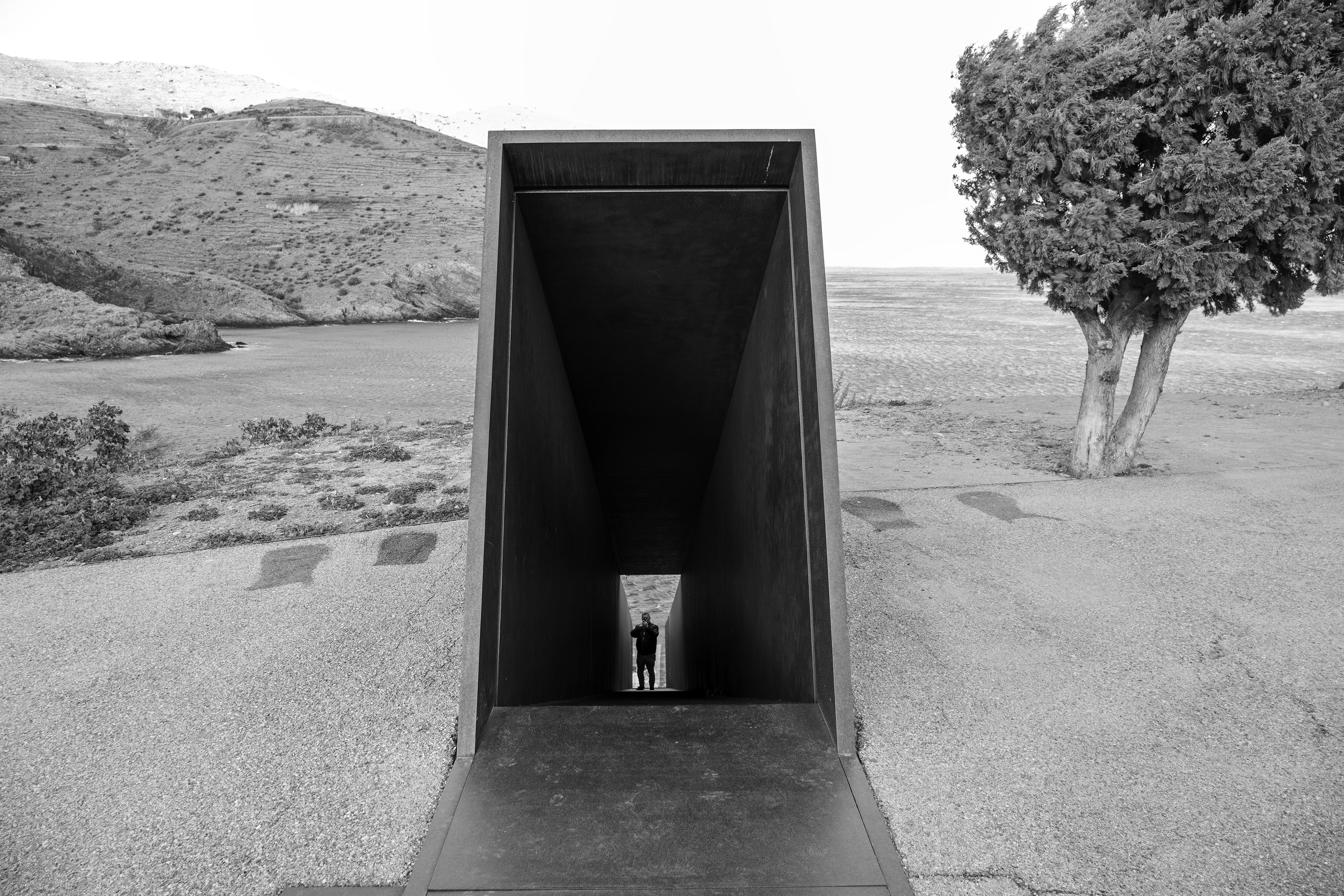
Monument Passagen in Port-Bou

The notes and manuscript for the Arcades Project and much of Benjamin's correspondence had been entrusted to Benjamin's friend Georges Bataille before Benjamin fled Paris under Nazi occupation. Bataille, who worked as a librarian at the Bibliothèque Nationale, hid the manuscript in a closed archive at the library where it was eventually discovered after the war.

The full text of Benjamin's unfinished magnum opus was published in English translation by Harvard University Press in 1999 after years of difficult editorial work undertaken by Rolf Tiedemann, the editor of the landmark 1982 German edition.

The Arcades Project, as it stands, is often claimed to be a forerunner to postmodernism.

A monument dedicated to Walter Benjamin in Portbou carries the name Passagen.

== Bibliography ==
=== Primary source ===
- Walter Benjamin (2002), Rolf Tiedemann (ed.), The Arcades Project, New York: Belknap Press, p. 1088, ISBN 0-674-00802-2 Howard Eiland and Kevin McLaughlin (Translators)

=== Secondary sources ===
- Susan Buck-Morss. The Dialectics of Seeing: Walter Benjamin and the Arcades Project (Studies in Contemporary German Social Thought), Boston: MIT Press, 1991, 505 pages. (English) ISBN 0-262-52164-4
- Susan Buck-Morss. Seeing <—> Making | Room for Thought, Los Angeles: Inventory Press, 2024, 400 pages. ISBN 978-1-941753-53-8
- Federico Castigliano, Flâneur. The Art of Wandering the Streets of Paris, 2017. ISBN 978-1546942092
- Beatrice Hanssen (ed) Walter Benjamin And the Arcades Project (Walter Benjamin Studies), London: Continuum International Publishing Group, 2006), 256 pages. (English) ISBN 0-8264-6387-8.
- David Kishik, "The Manhattan Project: A Theory of a City." (Stanford: Stanford University Press, 2015), 288 pages. ISBN 978-0-80478-603-4 (cloth) – ISBN 978-1-50360-277-9 (paper)
- Duy Lap Nguyen. (2022). Walter Benjamin and the Critique of Political Economy : A New Historical Materialism. London UK: Bloomsbury Academic.
