= Anthelme Trimolet =

French painter (1798–1866)

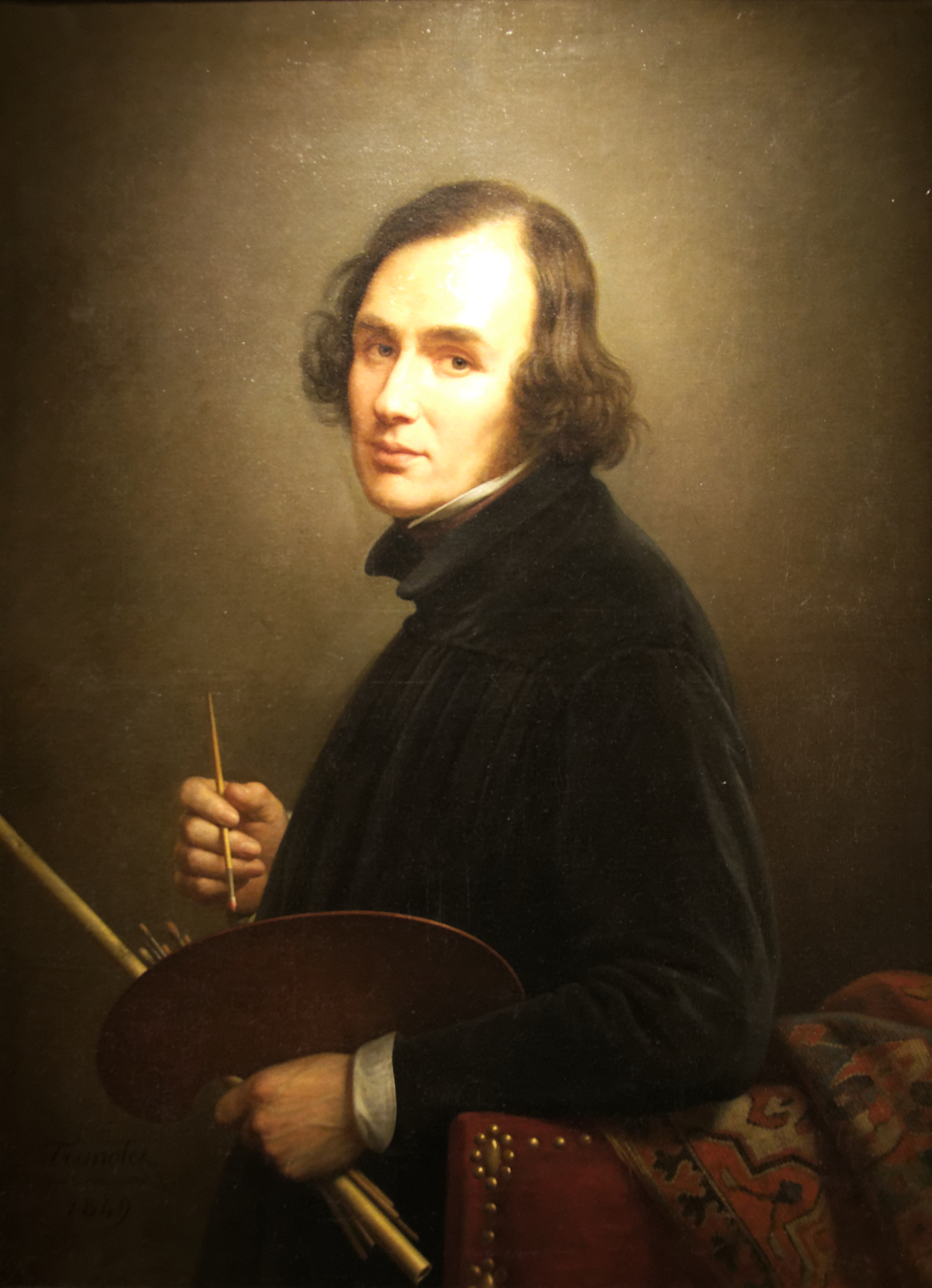
Self-portrait (1849)

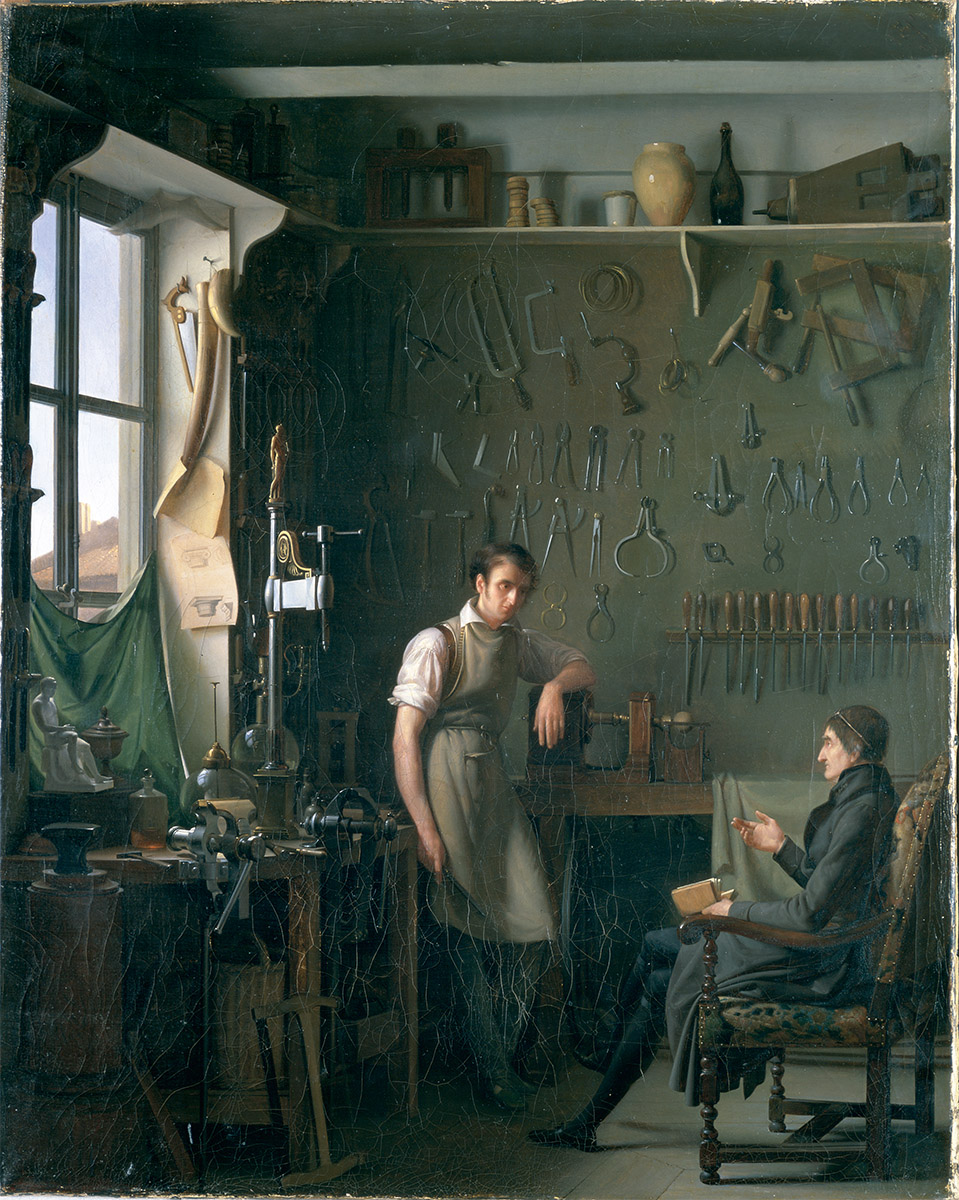
Interior of a Mechanic's Workshop

Anthelme Claude Honoré Trimolet (8 May 1798 - 17 December 1866) was a French painter, notable for portraits and interiors with figures.

== Biography ==
Trimolet was born in Lyon, the son of a draftsman. While still very young, he was enrolled at the École nationale des beaux-arts de Lyon. At the age of ten, he was assigned to the Special School of Design and studied with Pierre Révoil until 1813. He received a gold laurel in 1815 and had his first exhibition at the Salon in 1819 with his "Interior of a Mechanic's Workshop". From that year until 1830, he taught drawing at the Royal College, becoming a professor in 1820.

He was also interested in archaeology and ivory carving. In his historical paintings, he focused on scenes from the Middle Ages. As an illustrator, he produced scenes from the Henriade of Voltaire. In his essay "The Painter of Modern Life," Charles Baudelaire referred to Trimolet as a "chronicler of poverty and the humble life". Occasionally, he worked as an art restorer, focussing especially on the old Dutch Masters. He was an opponent of the prevailing trend for minute detail in paintings and wrote a short poem on the subject in which he singled out Adriaen van der Werff for special praise.

Together with his wife, Edma, who was also an artist, he amassed a large collection of paintings and other art objects as well as coins, furniture, jewellery and old weapons. At times, his work apparently suffered from his devotion to this pursuit. Something of a misanthrope, he was always ready to pounce on any merchant whose items were not authentic. After his death, Edma continued collecting. In her will, she left their collection to the Musée des Beaux-Arts de Dijon.

== Sources ==
- Aimé Vingtrinier, La Paresse d'un peintre (esquisse), published by the author, 1866. Complete text online @ Google Books
- Marie-Claude Chaudonneret, Le temps de la peinture. Lyon 1800-1914, (exhibition catalogue, Musée des beaux-arts de Lyon, Fage, 2007, pgs.29-35.
