= Kathy Psomiades =

- Education: Bryn Mawr College
- Alma mater: Yale University
- Scientific career
- Fields: Literary criticism
- Institutions: Duke University

Kathy Alexis Psomiades is an American literary critic and an associate professor of English at Duke University.

== Education ==
Psomiades graduated from Bryn Mawr College and received her M.A. and M.Phil. from Yale University before earning her Ph.D. at Yale.

== Career ==
Psomiades taught at the University of Notre Dame before joining Duke's faculty in 2003. Her first book, Beauty's Body: Femininity and Representation in British Aestheticism (Stanford University Press, 1997), examines the work done in 19th-century aesthetic poetry by a certain culturally pervasive image of embodied beauty. In 1999, she co-edited with Talia Schaffer a collection of essays called Women and British Representation (University of Virginia Press, 1999), which worked to carve out a space for femininity in both 19th-century artistic production and contemporary literary criticism. In 2023 she published Primitive Marriage: Victorian Anthropology, the Novel, and Sexual Modernity, which focused on reinterpreting marriage plot and courtship rituals in Victorian novels by reading 19th-century fiction alongside contemporaneous anthropological and Darwinian accounts of mating and reproduction.

Her essays have appeared in Novel: A Forum on Fiction, Victorian Poetry, Victorian Review, The Oxford Encyclopedia of British Literature (2006, ed. David Scott Kastan and Nancy Armstrong), Criticism, Victorian Studies, Nineteenth-Century Literature, and Modernism/Modernity, in addition to numerous essay collections. She has been the director of graduate studies in Duke's English department since 2021. Along with Michael Valdez Moses and Michael Gillespie she convened Duke's Political Theory Working Group. She received an NEH Fellowship and the Kaneb Award on for undergraduate teaching at Notre Dame.
