= Constantin Guys =

French painter (1802–1892)

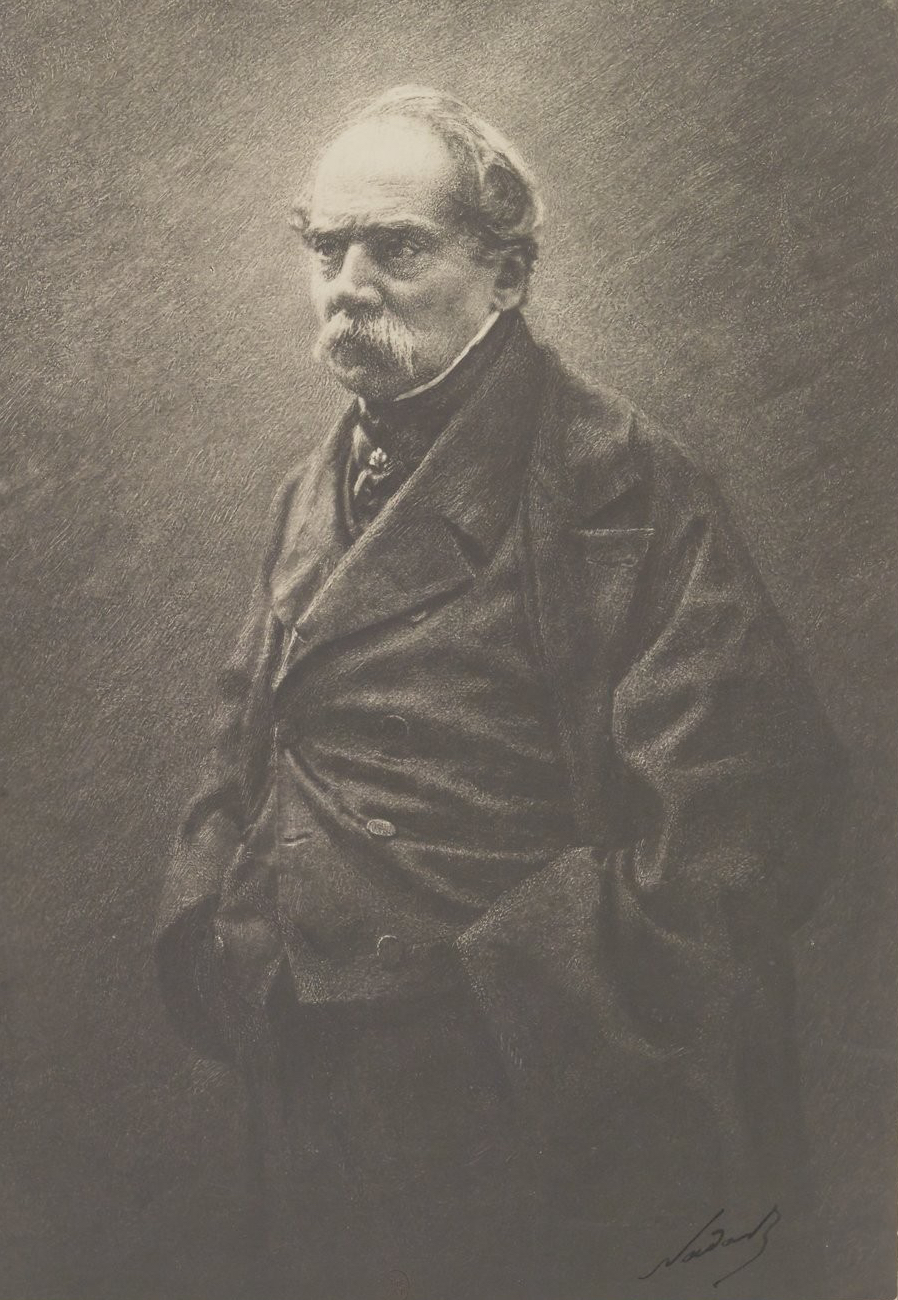
Constantin Guys by Nadar

Constantin Guys (born Ernest-Adolphe Guys de Saint-Hélène, December 3, 1802 – December 13, 1892) was a French Crimean War correspondent, water color painter and illustrator for British and French newspapers.

== Biography ==
Guys was born and baptized in Vlissingen, the son of François Lazare Guys and his second wife, Elisabeth Bétin. His father had been appointed civilian chief of the French Navy in Rochefort in 1796 and was stationed in Vlissingen from 1800 until 1805, after which the family moved to Calais. At the age of 20, Constantin served in the cavalry, but only a little later toured in Greece with Lord Byron. His career as an artist didn't start until he was about 40.

Baudelaire called him the "painter of modern life," and wrote a long essay on Guys called “Le Peintre de la vie moderne” (1863), in which he extensively praised his works, under the pseudonym "Monsieur G". In this essay the poet postulated two quintessentially “modern” subjects for an artist to address: the brothel and the procession of carriage folk in the Bois. Robert de Montesquiou wrote a review of Guys that acknowledged Baudelaire's essay, compared Guys favorably to Whistler, and emphasized his portrayal of details of women's clothing, and horse carriages. Gustave Geffroy wrote a book about Constantin Guys titled "Constantin Guys, l'historien du Second Empire" (Constantin Guys, the Historian of the Second Empire). This book explored Guys's life and work, particularly his role as a chronicler of the Second French Empire. His subjects were Second French Empire life. In the Dutch novel "Au pair" by W. F. Hermans, one of the main characters is fascinated by Constantin Guys. Guys died in Paris, aged 90.

As John Richardson notes in his “A Life of Picasso”, Pablo Picasso had read Baudelaire’s essay, for which he expressed the highest regard, and was very familiar with Gustave Geffroy’s book on Guys. Since Picasso aspired to be identified with Baudelaire’s “painter of modern life”, he intended to paint these two subjects. Guys’s drawings triggered Picasso’s sketches for his “Bois de Boulogne”, in which he sought to portray Fernande Olivier en promenade with a horse and carriage in the background. Guys’s whorehouse scenes reproduced in Geffroy’s book became reflected in the grouping and posing of the "Les Demoiselles d’Avignon”

== Works ==
- Les Champs Élysées, 1922, Pavillon de Marsan du musée du Louvre, L'Illustration n°4123, 10/06/1922.
- Promenade en carosse, ca.1863, pen and ink with watercolor, Museo Cantonale d'Arte de Lugano
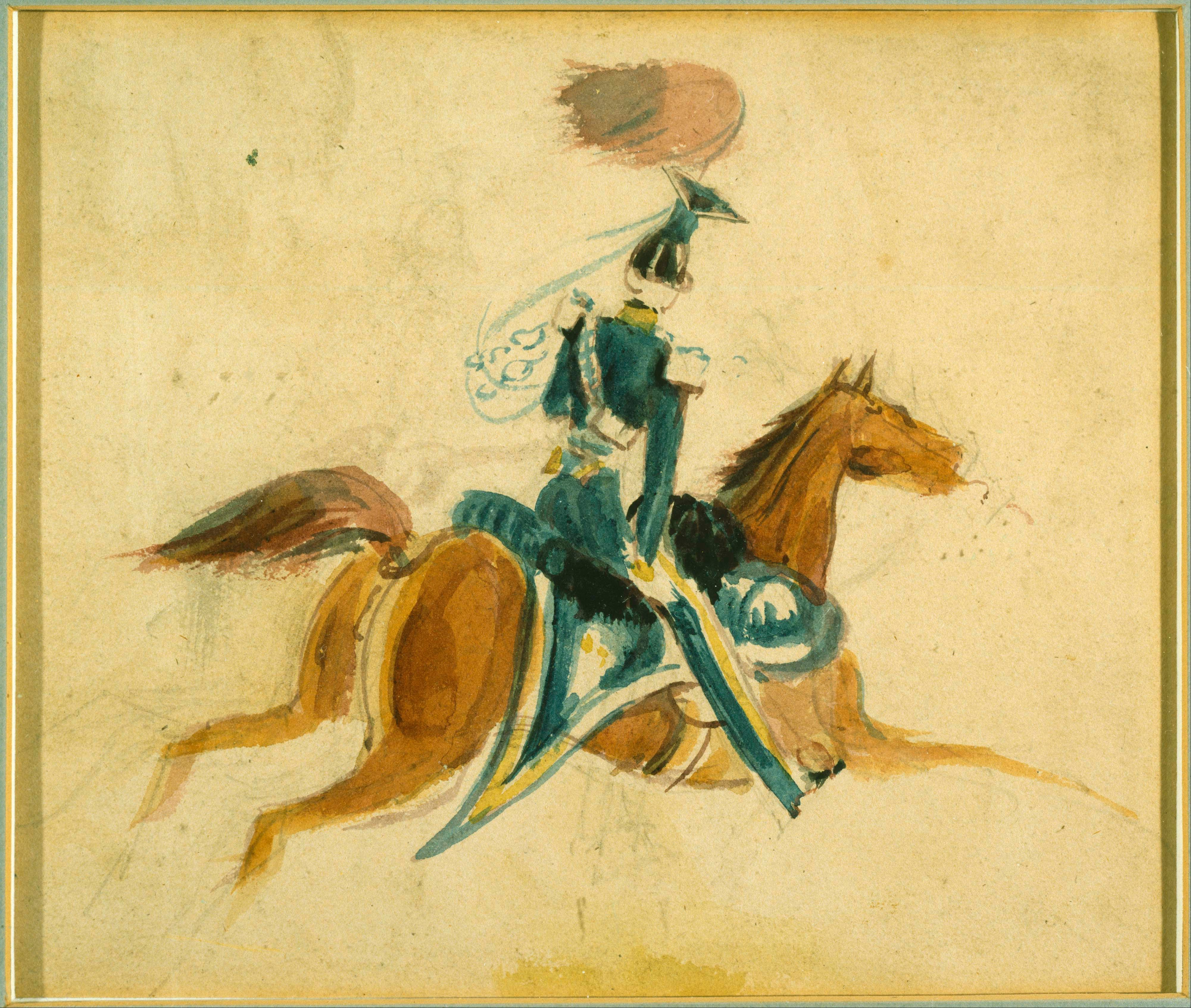
Man on Horseback

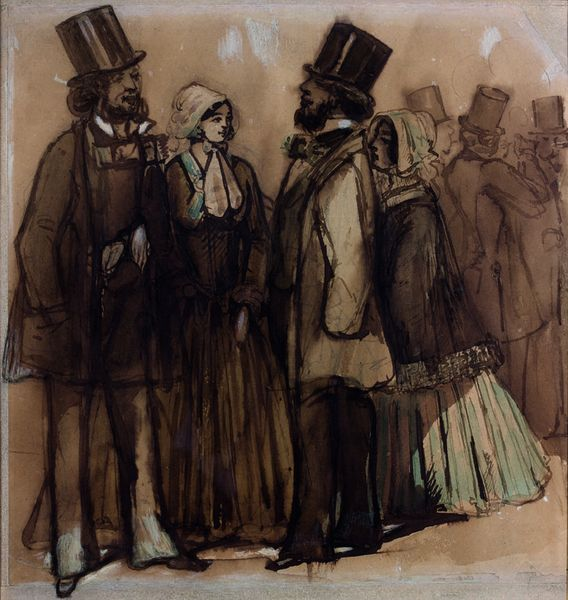
Meeting on the Promenade

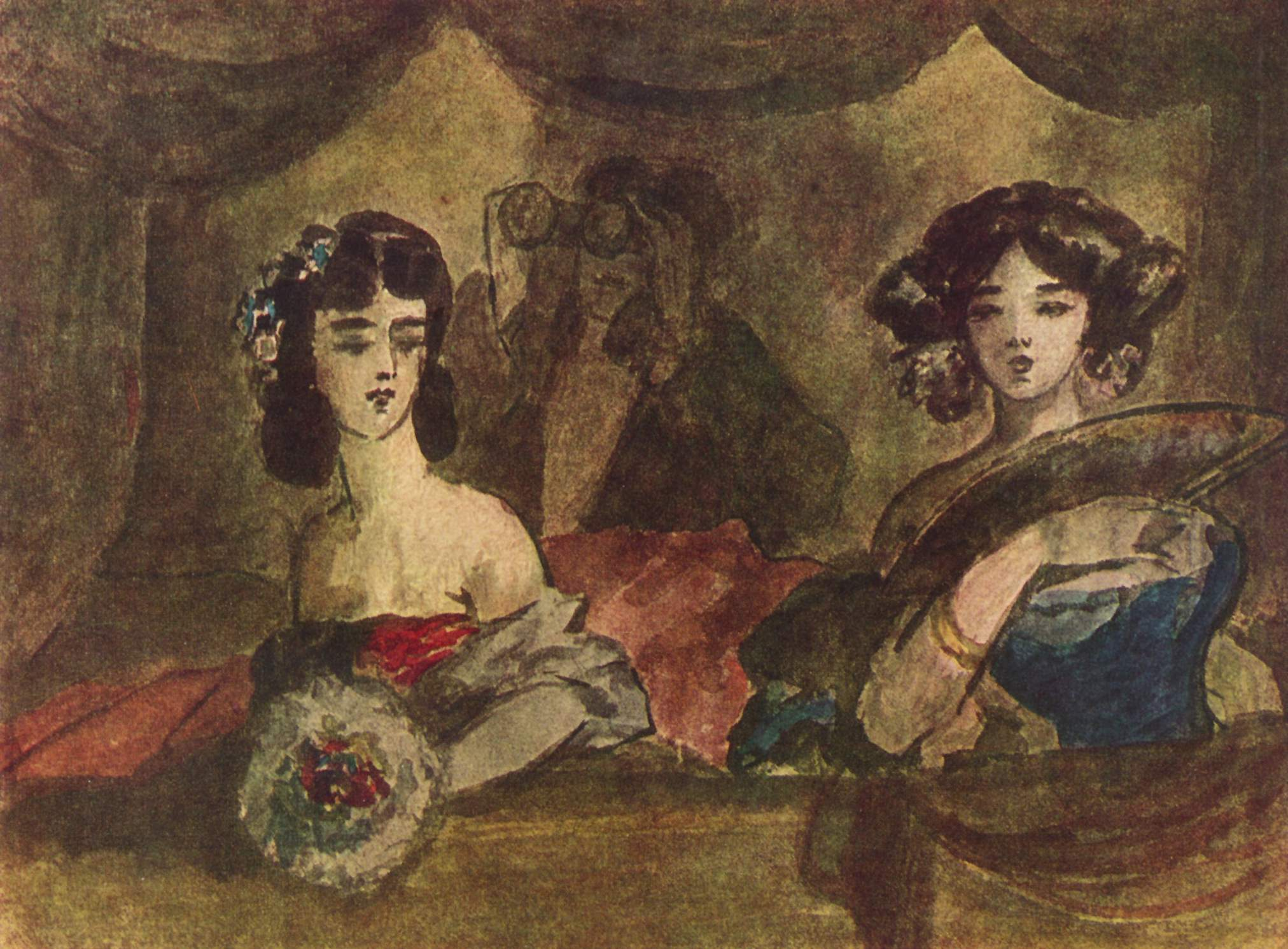
The Loge at the Opera

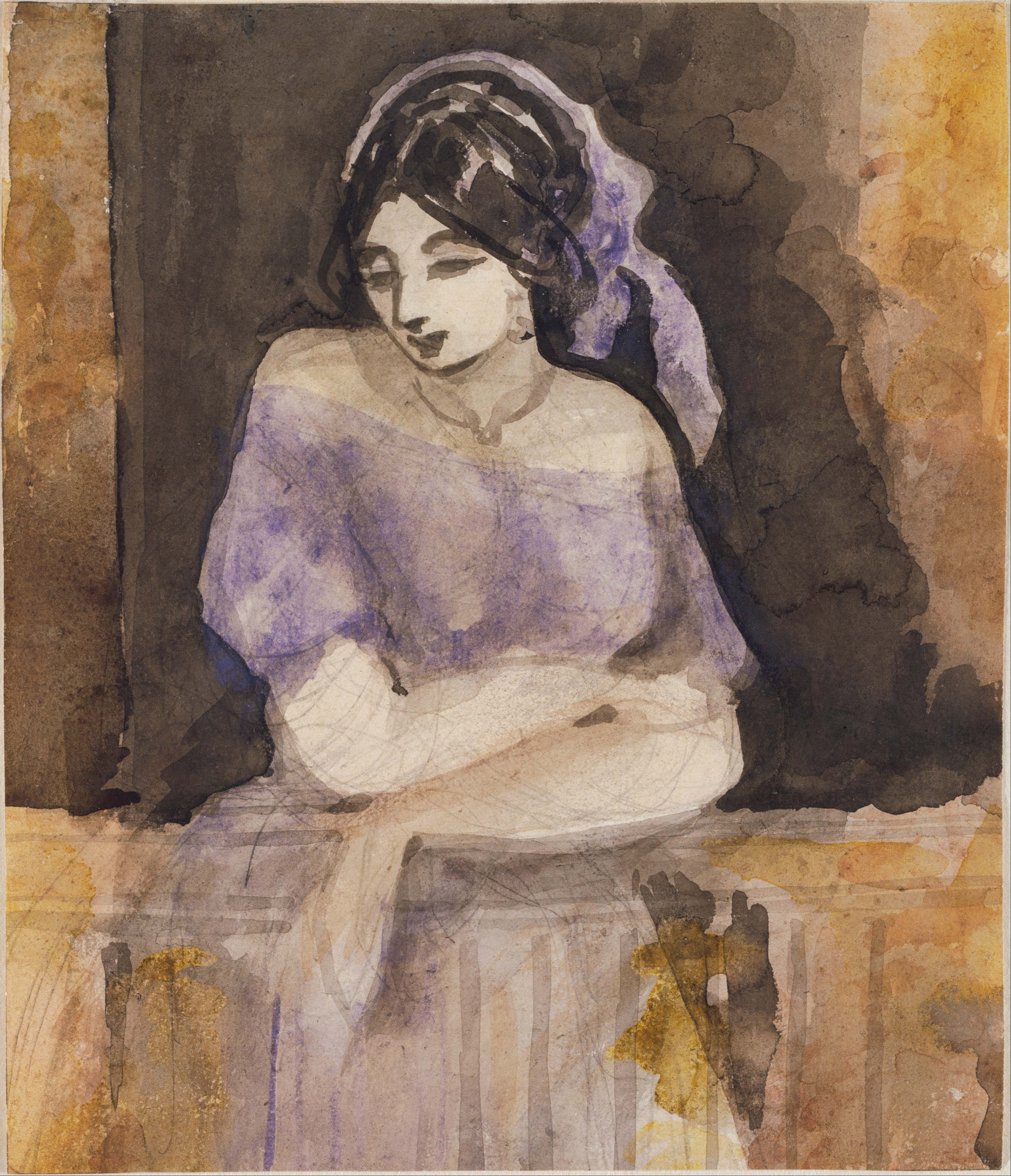
Young Spanish Woman

== Sources ==
- Artcyclopedia article on Constantin Guys
- Merriam-Webster's Biographical Dictionary. Merriam-Webster Incorporated, 1995. in Biography Resource Center. Farmington Hills, Mich.: Thomson Gale. 2007. Document Number: K1681154772. Online. November 6, 2007
