= Edma Trimolet =

French painter

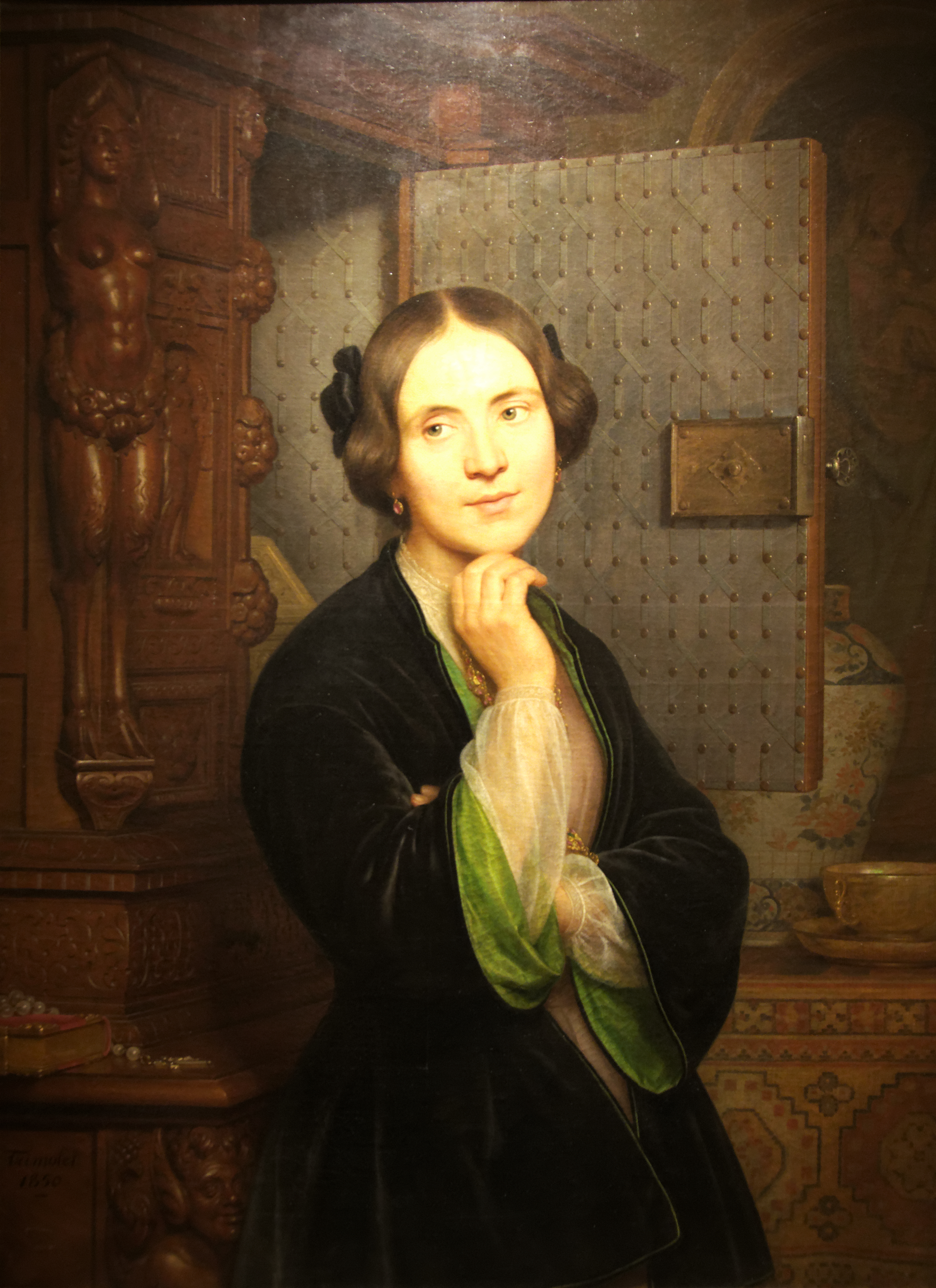
- Portrait by her husband (1850)
- Born: 1801 or 12 October 1802; Chalon-sur-Saône, Saône-et-Loire
- Died: 2 September 1878 (aged 75–77); Saint-Martin-sous-Montaigu, Saône-et-Loire
- Spouse: Anthelme Trimolet (m.)

Edma Trimolet (née Saunier; 1801/02–1878) was a French painter.

== Life ==
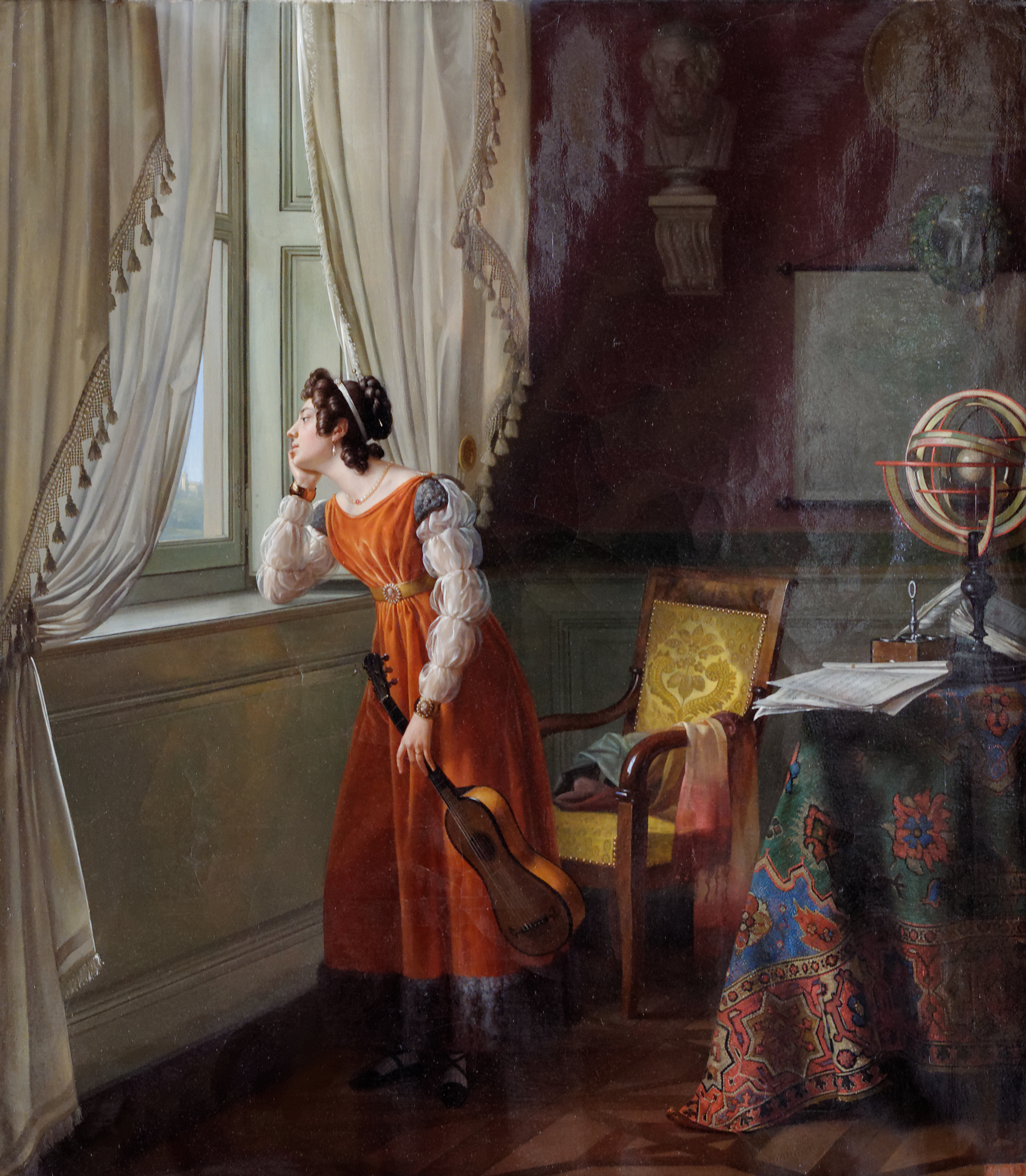
La Rêverie (1827)

Louise Agathe Edme Saunier was probably born in Chalon-sur-Saône in 1801. However, other sources say she was born in Lyon on 12 October 1802.

She became the wife and pupil of the Lyonnais painter Anthelme Trimolet. Under the influence of her husband, she favoured genre and interior scenes marked by the Troubadour style which flourished in the first half of the 19th-century within the Lyon School of painting. She also produced still lifes.

She died in Saint-Martin-sous-Montaigu on 2 September 1878.

== Art collection ==
The remarkable collection of paintings and works of art, brought together by the couple from 1825, was bequeathed to the Musée des Beaux-Arts de Dijon, together with works by the two artists.

== Works ==
- Dijon: Kitchen Interior;
- ——— Still-lifes;
- ——— Daydream;
- ——— sketch.
