= Rubbernecking =

People staring tactlessly; gawkers

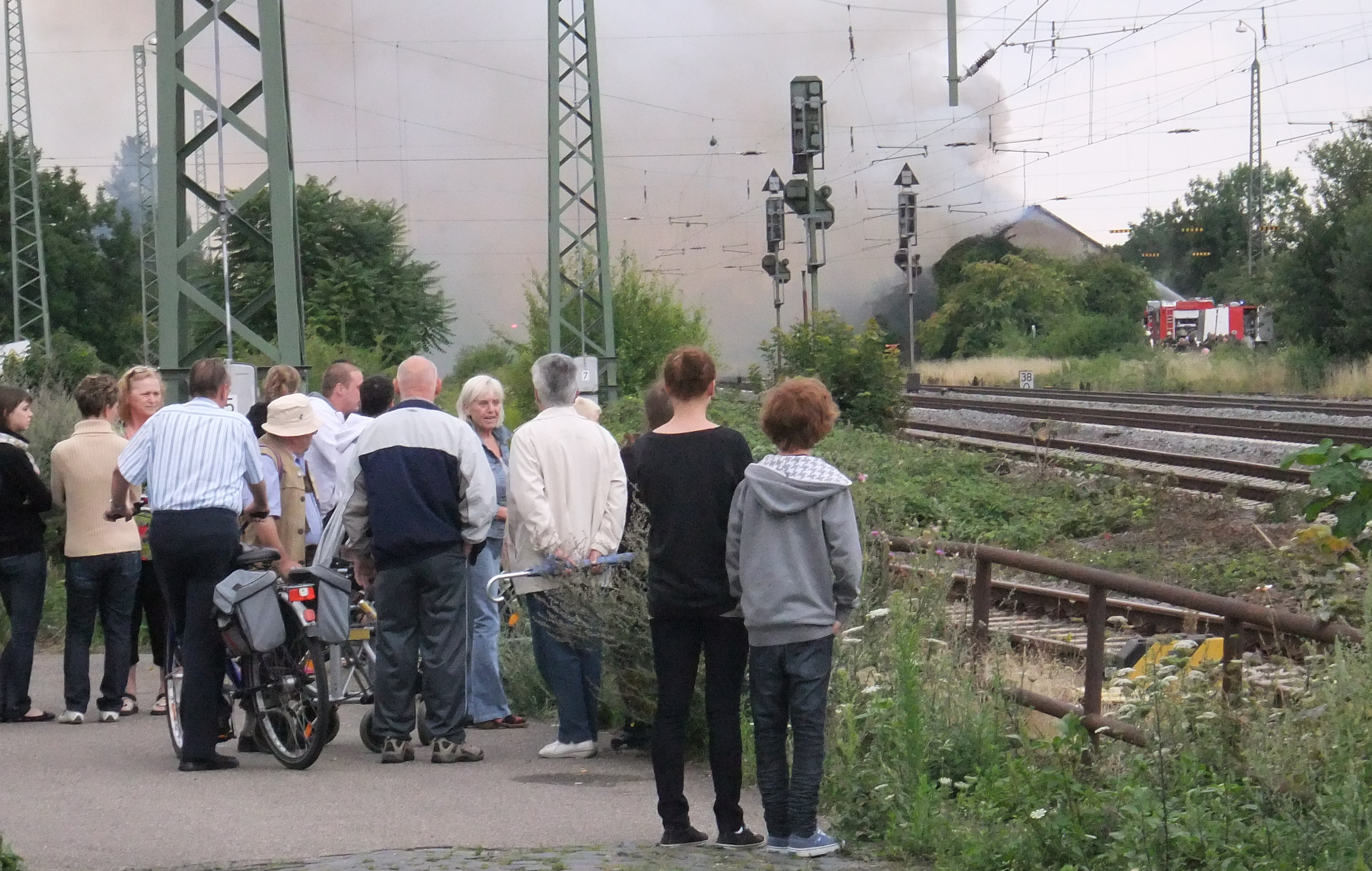
During fire fighting, onlookers must be kept at a safe distance for health reasons, especially to avoid poisonous gases.

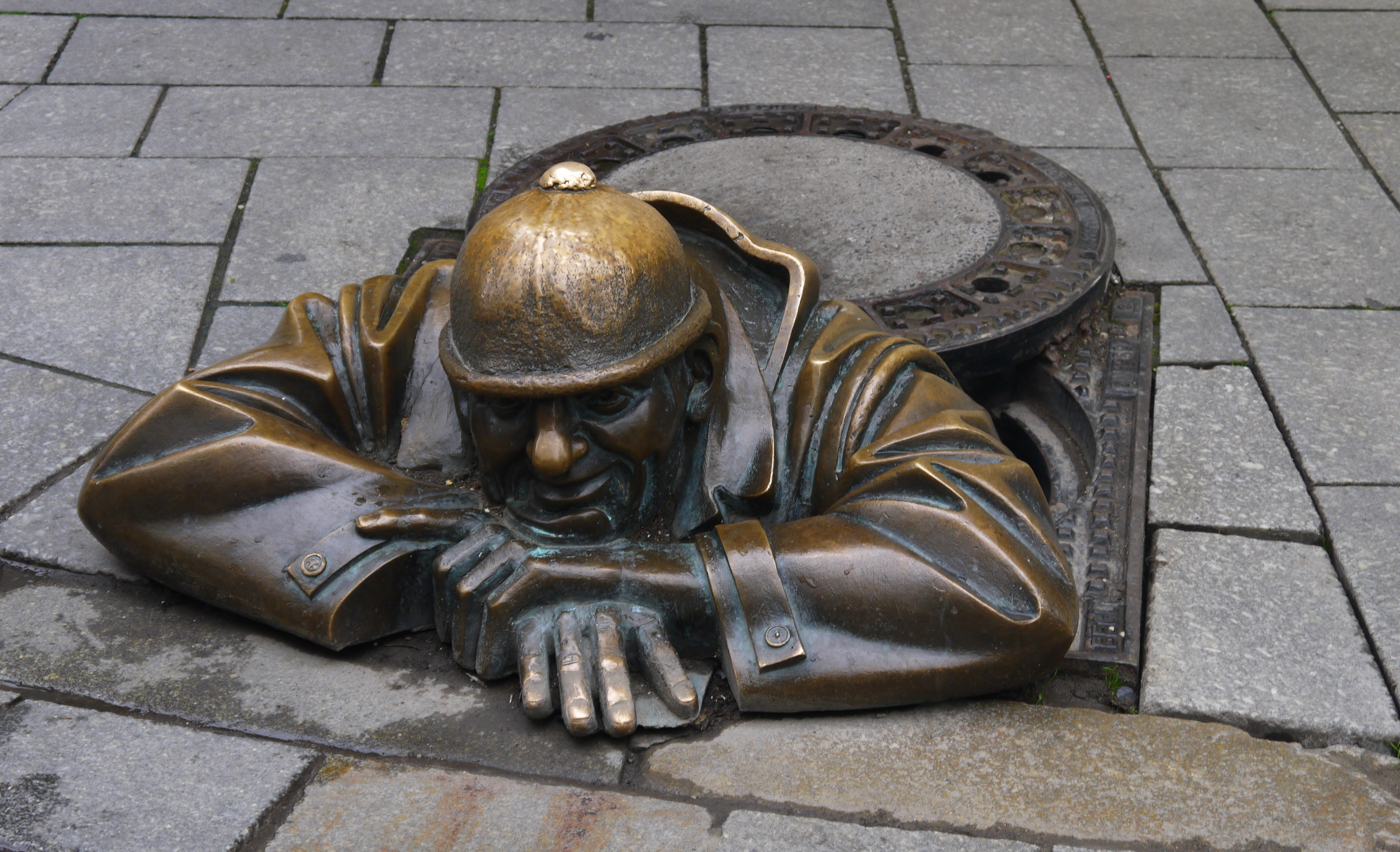
Čumil, the rubbernecker of Bratislava

Rubbernecking is a term primarily used to refer to bystanders stopping previous activity to stare at accidents. More generally, it can refer to anyone staring at an object of everyday interest compulsively. The term rubbernecking derives from the neck's appearance while trying to get a better view, that is, craning one's neck.

Rubberneck is associated with morbid curiosity. It is often the cause of traffic jams, sometimes referred to as "gapers' block" or "gapers' delay", as drivers slow down to see what happened in a crash. Rubberneck is considered as of 2007 unconventional English or slang.

== Etymology ==
The term rubbernecking was coined in the United States in the 1890s to refer to tourists. H. L. Mencken said the word rubberneck is "almost a complete treatise on American psychology" and "one of the best words ever coined".

By 1909, rubbernecking was used to describe the wagons, automobiles and buses used in tours around American cities, and through their Chinatowns. The tours included a megaphone-wielding individual offering commentary on the urban landscape. Chinese Rubbernecks was the title of a 1903 film.

One writer described the "out-of-towners" stretching their necks to see New York while having misinformation shouted at them, and artist John Sloan depicted them as geese in a 1917 etching called Seeing New York. Hawkers, touts and steerers were used to market the rubbernecking tours, also known as "gape wagons" or "yap wagons."

When phone lines were shared as "party lines", the term rubbernecking applied to someone who listened in on the conversation of others.

== Rubbernecking and the automobile ==
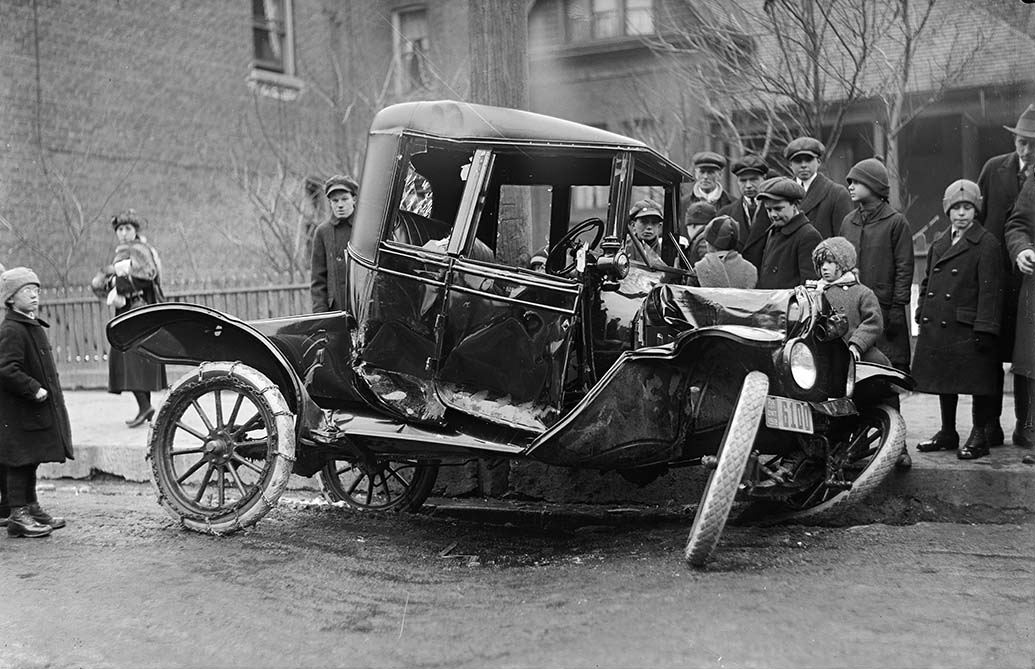
Rubberneckers are often found at road accidents; seen above is an accident from 1918.

The term is often used to refer to the activity of motorists slowing down in order to see something on the other side of a road or highway, often the scene of a traffic accident. This is sometimes also called accident gawking. A study on the English M6 motorway found that 29% of accidents and breakdowns caused slowdowns in the uninvolved opposite lanes. According to a 2003 study in the U.S., rubbernecking was the cause of 16% of distraction-related traffic accidents. Rubbernecking appears in the book 100 Most Dangerous Things in Everyday Life and What You Can Do About Them, which advises that the safest course when there are flashing lights and an accident is to keep moving, as "there is nothing to see here". Rubbernecking's impact on traffic has been the subject of studies and is said to be factored into highway design.

=== Prevention ===
Incident screens have been designed that can be erected around vehicle accidents. The plastic partitions are designed to shield accidents from passing motorists in order to deter rubbernecking and improve the flow of traffic. Several types of screens have been trialed in the United Kingdom.

== See also ==
- Badaud
