= The Man of the Crowd =

- Short story by Edgar Allan Poe
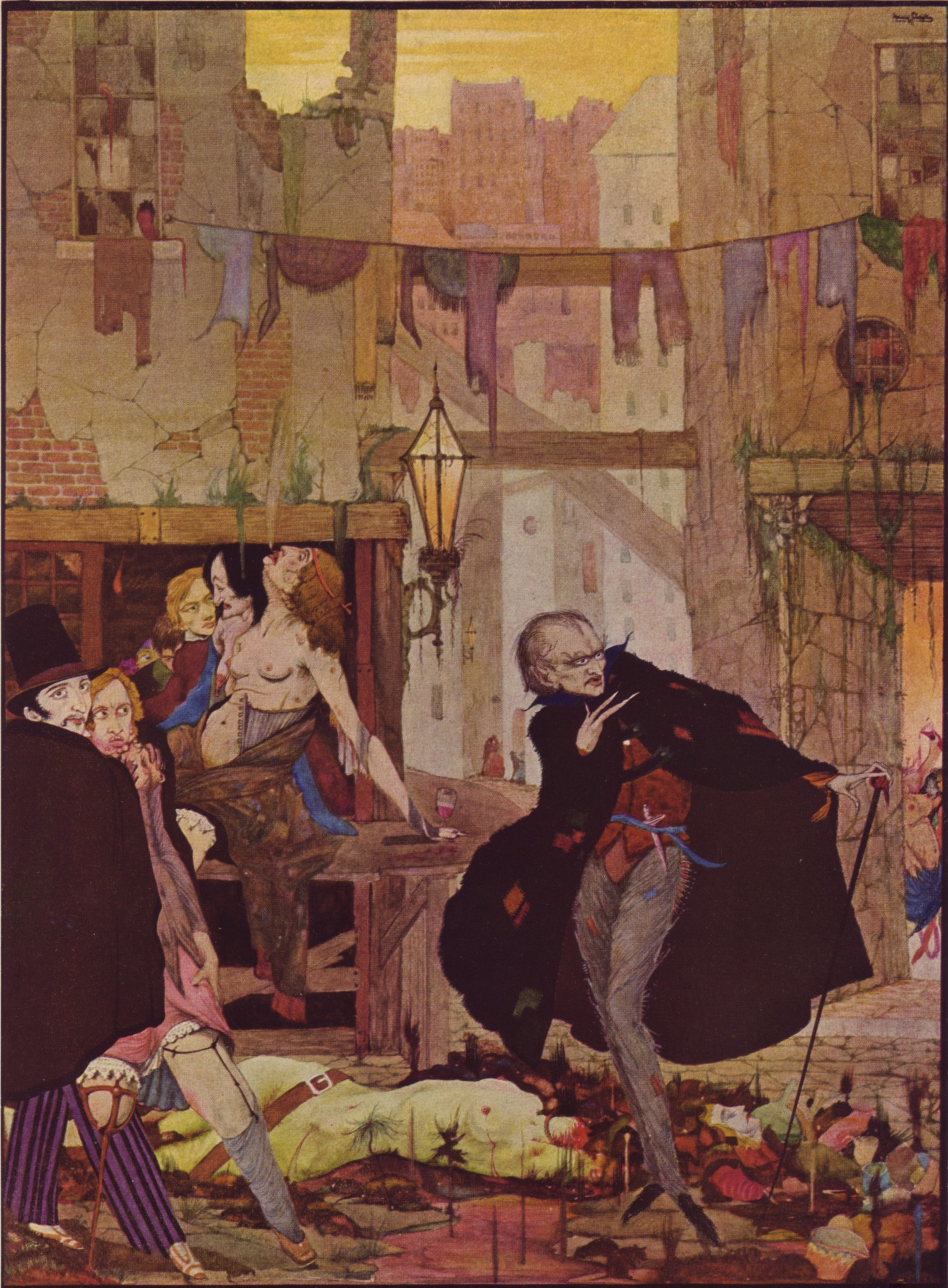
- Illustration by Harry Clarke for a London edition dated 1923
- Country: United States
- Language: English

Publication
- Publisher: Burton's Gentleman's Magazine and Atkinson's Casket (simultaneously released)
- Media type: Print (periodical)
- Publication date: December 1840

"The Man of the Crowd" is a short story by American writer Edgar Allan Poe about a nameless narrator following a man through a crowded London. It was first published in 1840.

== Plot summary ==
The story is introduced with the epigraph "Ce grand malheur, de ne pouvoir être seul" — a quote taken from The Characters of Man by Jean de La Bruyère. It translates to This great misfortune, of not being able to be alone. This same quotation is used in Poe's earliest tale, "Metzengerstein".

After an unnamed illness, the unnamed narrator sits in an unnamed coffee shop in London. He is fascinated by the crowd outside the window, and considers how isolated people think they are, despite "the very denseness of the company around". He takes time to categorize the different types of people he sees. As evening falls, the narrator focuses on "a decrepit old man, some sixty-five or seventy years of age", whose face has a peculiar idiosyncrasy, and whose body "was short in stature, very thin, and apparently very feeble" wearing filthy, ragged clothes of a "beautiful texture". The narrator dashes out of the coffee shop to follow the man from afar. The man leads the narrator through bazaars and shops, buying nothing, and into a poorer part of the city, then back into "the heart of the mighty London". This chase lasts through the evening and into the next day. Finally, exhausted, the narrator stands in front of the man, who still does not notice him. The narrator concludes the man is "the type and genius of deep crime" due to his inscrutability and inability to leave the crowds of London.

== Analysis ==
According to the text of the tale, the reason for the narrator's monomaniacal obsession with the man stems from "the absolute idiosyncrasy of [the man's] expression". He is the only person walking down the street the narrator can't categorize. Why the narrator is so haunted by him is not entirely clear, though it is implied that the two men are two sides of the same person, with the old man representing a secret side of the narrator, though the narrator is unable to see this. The old man may be wandering through the crowd in search of a lost friend or to escape the memory of a crime. The possible evil nature of the man is implied by the dagger that is possibly seen under his cloak — whatever crime he has committed condemns him to wander. This lack of disclosure has been compared to similar vague motivations in "The Cask of Amontillado". Poe purposely presents the story as a sort of mystification, inviting readers to surmise the old man's secret themselves.

At the beginning of the tale, the narrator surveys and categorizes the people around him in a similar way as Walt Whitman in "Song of Myself". Poe's narrator, however, lacks Whitman's celebratory spirit. While viewing these people, the narrator is able to ascertain a great deal of information about them based on their appearance and by noting small details. For example, he notices that a man's ear sticks out a small amount, indicating he must be a clerk who stores his pen behind his ear. Poe would later incorporate this ability to observe small details in his character C. Auguste Dupin. All of this is a virtuoso performance of the representation of social typicality; it owes something to Dickens’s Sketches by Boz, but there is also something of the moralizing medieval Vice in its parade of degenerates, of depraved women and of social outcasts. In one sense this is a sideshow, a digression from the main line of the narrative, which is concerned with the crowd only as an abstract force; in another, however, it brings to the fore the sense that it is only through these social clichés that the crowd can be made humanly understandable.

In describing the man, the narrator "describes a set of contradictory characteristics: ‘there arose confusedly and paradoxically within my mind, the ideas of vast mental power, of caution, of penuriousness, of avarice, of coolness, of malice, of blood-thirstiness, of triumph, of merriment, of excessive terror, of intense — of supreme despair’. The man’s dress, too, is contradictory: his linen is dirty but ‘of beautiful texture’, and through a tear in his cloak the narrator glimpses a diamond and a dagger".

“The Man of the Crowd” stands as a transitional work between the haunting Gothic tales of the late 1830s and the ratiocinative fiction of the early forties, possessing obvious qualities of both.

This story is also the beginnings of Poe's detective stories. Walter Benjamin writes, "[The Man of the Crowd] is something like an X-ray of a detective story. It does away with all the drapery that a crime represents. Only the armature remains: the pursuer, the crowd, and an unknown man who manages to walk through London in such a way that he always remains in the middle of the crowd". In agreeing with Benjamin, William Brevda contributes that “Poe splits the human psyche into pursuer and pursued, self and other, ego and id, “detective” and criminal, past and future…” “Poe also echoes Sophocles in his theme of the guilty knowledge that humans run from and simultaneously toward. In the nightmare Poe dreams for us, the ordinary person, the man in the street is at heart a criminal".

The setting of London is one of the few specific details revealed in the tale. By 1840, London was the largest city in the world with a population of 750,000. Poe would have known London from the time he spent there as a boy with his foster family, the Allans, although he may have relied on the writings of Charles Dickens for details of London's streets. In this story and others, Poe associates modern cities with the growth of impersonal crime.

== Publication history ==
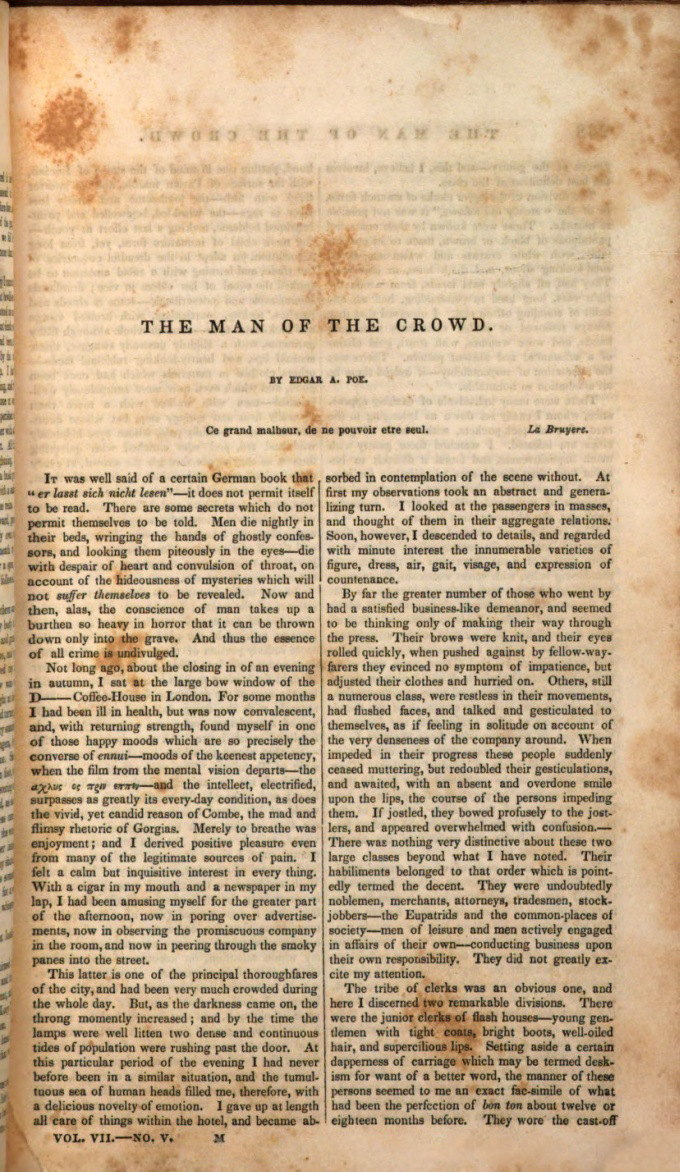
First publication in the inaugural issue of Graham's Magazine, December 1840, pp. 267-270.

The story was first published simultaneously in the December 1840 issues of Atkinson's Casket and Burton's Gentleman's Magazine. The latter was the final issue of that periodical. William Evans Burton sold his periodical to George Rex Graham so the inaugural issue was under the name Graham's Magazine. There is some confusion because the December 1840 issue was bound with Burton's Gentleman's Magazine issues ending in November 1840. It was later included in Wiley & Putnam's collection simply titled Tales by Edgar A. Poe.

== Reception ==
At the time of the story's publication, Poe's reputation in the United States was mixed, but his reception among many French modernists, including Stéphane Mallarmé and Paul Valéry, was enthusiastic. Charles Baudelaire discusses "The Man of the Crowd" in "The Painter of Modern Life"; it would go on to become a key example in Walter Benjamin's essay "On Some Motifs in Baudelaire", which theorizes the role of the crowd in modernity.
