= Kevin McLaughlin (professor) =

American literature scholar (born 1959)

Kevin McLaughlin (born 1959) is an American scholar of comparative literature. Currently he is at the George Hazard Crooker Distinguished University Professor of English, Professor of comparative literature and German studies, Director of the John Nicholas Brown Center for Advanced Study, and Dean Emeritus of the Faculty at Brown University. He is also a published author.

McLaughlin has also held two other named chair professorships, the Nicholas Brown Professor of Oratory and Belles Lettres from 2005 to 2011, and the Manning Endowed Professor of English and Comparative Literature from 1997 to 2000. He has been editor-in-chief of the journal Novel: A Forum on Fiction.

== Works ==
Books

- Writing in Parts: Imitation and Exchange in 19th-Century Literature, Stanford University Press, 1995
- Paperwork: Literature and Mass Mediacy in the Age of Paper, University of Pennsylvania Press, 2005
- Poetic Force: Poetry after Kant, Stanford University Press, 2014
- The Philology of Life: Walter Benjamin's Critical Program, Fordham University Press, 2023

As Translator

- Walter Benjamin (2002), The Arcades Project, Harvard University Press, p. 1088, ISBN 9780674008021 Howard Eiland and Kevin McLaughlin (Translators)
