= The Metropolis and Mental Life =

1903 essay by Georg Simmel

"The Metropolis and Mental Life" (German: Die Großstädte und das Geistesleben) is a 1903 essay by a German sociologist, Georg Simmel.

== Overview ==
One of Simmel's most widely read works, "The Metropolis and Mental Life" was originally provided as one of a series of lectures on all aspects of city life by experts in various fields ranging from science and religion to art. The series was conducted alongside the Dresden cities exhibition of 1903.

Simmel compared the psychology of the individual in rural life with the psychology of the city dweller. His investigation determines that the metropolis alters human psychology. Forced to contend with drastic changes in a metropolitan environment, the individual erects psychological defences to protect itself from the stimuli of the metropolis. Consequently, the city dweller’s attitude and psychology are fundamentally different from those of a rural inhabitant. The psychology of the city dweller, therefore, exhibits what Simmel describes as adaptations and adjustments which ultimately reflect the structures of the metropolis. Simmel characterises rural life as a combination of meaningful relationships established over time. Those kinds of relationships cannot be established in the metropolis for a number of reasons (e.g. anonymity, number of vendors etc.) and as a result the city dweller can establish a relationship only with currency. Money and exchange thus become the media with which city dwellers invest their trust:

The deepest problems of modern life flow from the attempt of the individual to maintain the independence and individuality of his existence against the sovereign powers of society, against the weight of the historical heritage and the external culture and technique of life. The antagonism represents the most modern form of the conflict which primitive man must carry on with nature for his own bodily existence. The eighteenth century may have called for liberation from all the ties which grew up historically in politics, in religion, in morality and in economics in order to permit the original natural virtue of man, which is equal in everyone, to develop without inhibition; the nineteenth century may have sought to promote, in addition to man's freedom, his individuality (which is connected with the division of labor) and his achievements which make him unique and indispensable but which at the same time make him so much the more dependent on the complementary activity of others; Nietzsche may have seen the relentless struggle of the individual as the prerequisite for his full development, while socialism found the same thing in the suppression of all competition – but in each of these the same fundamental motive was at work, namely the resistance of the individual to being levelled, swallowed up in the social-technological mechanism.

— Georg Simmel "The Metropolis and Mental Life" 1903,

Simmel seeks to explain human nature and how it plays a part in society:

Man's nature, originally good and common to all, should develop unhampered. In addition to more liberty, the nineteenth century demanded the functional specialization of man and his work; this specialization makes one individual incomparable to another, and each of them indispensable to the highest possible extent.

— Georg Simmel "The Metropolis and Mental Life" 1903,

== See also ==
- Antipositivism
- Symbolic interactionism
- Urban sociology
