= Susan Buck-Morss =

American philosopher and historian

- Born: Susan Felmly Buck-Morss

Academic background
- Education: Vassar College (AB); Yale University (MA); Georgetown University (PhD)
- Thesis: Theodor W. Adorno: Historical Origins of His Theory (1975)

Academic work
- Era: 20th-/21st-century philosophy
- Region: Western philosophy
- School or tradition: Continental philosophy Frankfurt School
- Main interests: Universal history

Susan Buck-Morss is an American political theorist, philosopher, and cultural critic associated with critical theory, visual studies, and global political thought. She is Distinguished Professor of Political Science at the CUNY Graduate Center, and Professor Emerita of Government at Cornell University.

Buck-Morss is widely recognized for her scholarship on Walter Benjamin, Theodor W. Adorno, and G. W. F. Hegel, as well as for her influential argument that the Haitian Revolution played a role in shaping modern ideas of freedom, specifically in Hegel’s conception of history. Her work is especially known for its reinterpretation of materialist and cultural history, the Frankfurt School, and the relationship between aesthetics, politics, and modernity.

She received the Frantz Fanon Prize in 2011.

== Academic career and early collaborations ==
Buck-Morss earned her B.A. in European intellectual history from Vassar College, followed by an M.A. in history from Yale University, where she studied American history with C. Vann Woodward and Howard Lamar. A Fulbright-D.A.A.D. fellowship in 1968-69 enabled a year’s study in Germany (Tübingen) before continuing for her Ph.D. at Georgetown University in European Intellectual History. Her dissertation advisor was the Palestinian-born intellectual historian Hisham Sharabi. In 1971-72, with funding from D.A.A.D., she returned to Germany for research on her doctoral dissertation, later published as The Origin of Negative Dialectics: Theodor W. Adorno, Walter Benjamin and the Frankfurt School. In Frankfurt, she worked with Rolf Tiedemann, director of the Adorno and Benjamin archives, and she later edited volume 20 of Adorno’s Gesammelte Schriften (Collected Works), Soziologische Schriften II. She also undertook graduate study in philosophy, sociology, and psychology at Goethe University Frankfurt, where she attended seminars of Jürgen Habermas.

In 1976 she became a fellow at the Institute for Policy Studies (IPS), a Washington D.C. think tank whose co-founder Marc Raskin assigned her to work with Institute Fellow and Chilean ambassador to the US under Salvador Allende, Orlando Letelier, shortly before Letelier was assassinated by a car bomb on the streets of Washington D.C. She continued to work at the IPS Amsterdam branch, Transnational Institute (TNI), when she met and worked with TNI Fellow John Berger, whose influence on her own writings in visual studies was significant.

Buck-Morss joined the faculty of Cornell University in 1978, where she taught political theory for over three decades in the Department of Government, becoming a full professor in 1990 and later holding the Jan Rock Zubrow ’77 Professorship of Government. At Cornell, she also held appointments in the Graduate Programs of Comparative Literature, German Studies, History of Art, Romance Studies and the School of Art, Architecture, and City Planning. She served one term as the Director of Visual Studies. She continued research and teaching on the Critical Theory of the Frankfurt School, and published a major study, The Dialectics of Seeing: Walter Benjamin and the Arcades Project, in 1989.

During her Cornell years, she held grants from the Guggenheim Foundation, the MacArthur Foundation, the Rockefeller Foundation, the Getty Foundation, and the Canada-United States Fulbright Program.

In addition to her permanent appointments, Buck-Morss has held numerous visiting professorships and fellowships, including appointments at New York University, Pratt Institute, Rutgers University, Princeton University (Carpenter lectures), Cornell Society for the Humanities, Florida Atlantic University, Getty Research Institute, New School for Social Research, Russian State University for the Humanities (RGGU) in Moscow, Jan van Eyk Academie in Maastricht, and University of the Arts, London.

Since 2010, she has been Distinguished Professor of Political Theory at the CUNY Graduate Center in New York City, where she is also a core faculty member of the Committee on Globalization and Social Change.

== Scholarship and contributions ==
Buck-Morss’s writing crosses traditional academic boundaries. Rather than working within a single discipline, she moves between philosophy, politics, history, and visual culture, often using art and images as a way of thinking about power, ideology, and collective imagination.

=== Selected works ===
- The Origin of Negative Dialectics: Theodor W. Adorno, Walter Benjamin, and the Frankfurt Institute (1977)
- The Dialectics of Seeing: Walter Benjamin and the Arcades Project (1989)
- Dreamworld and Catastrophe: The Passing of Mass Utopia in East and West (2000)
- Thinking Past Terror: Islamism and Critical Theory on the Left (2003)
- Hegel, Haiti, and Universal History (2009)
- Revolution Today (2019)
- Year 1: A Philosophical Recounting (2021)
- Thinking–Making–Room for Thought (2024), a collaboration with graphic artist Kevin McCaughey and book publisher Adam Michaels.

Her books have been translated into numerous languages, including German, French, Spanish, Italian, Portuguese, Swedish, Polish, Turkish, Hebrew, Arabic, Urdu, Korean, Japanese, and Chinese.

==== The Origin of Negative Dialectics: Theodor W. Adorno, Walter Benjamin, and the Frankfurt Institute (1977) ====
Her first book was based on her dissertation and included research in the Adorno archive. It remains in print as a seminal work for the understanding of the Frankfurt School thinkers and the paradoxes that followed the adoption of their theories by American political thought.

==== The Dialectics of Seeing: Walter Benjamin and the Arcades Project (1989) ====
In this book, Buck-Morss reconstructs the Passagen Werk (Arcades Project), a massive assembly of notes for a project that Walter Benjamin did not live to write. With the use of images of objects and spaces of mass culture, Buck-Morss undertakes the exercise of expanding on the allegory of the Paris Arcades that fascinated Benjamin to form a sharp critique of capitalism.

==== Dreamworld and Catastrophe: The Passing of Mass Utopia in East and West (2000) ====
In this book, Buck-Morss develops the dreamworld as an analytical concept to understand the moments of mass utopian imagining of the 20th century, showing how closely the capitalist utopia of consumption and socialist utopia of production resembled each other in their goals of industrial progress. In three chapters on the Dreamworlds of Democracy, History and Mass Culture, Buck-Morss examines, also with the use of images, how both the United States and the Soviet Union produced large-scale utopian dreamworlds through architecture, spectacle, consumer culture, and political imagery.

In the last chapter, “Afterward”, Buck-Morss situates the book historically through her decade-long collaboration with philosophers and artists in Moscow, her visits to Eastern Europe, and her engagement with the Russian language and culture during the fall of the Soviet system and its transition to capitalism.

==== Thinking Past Terror: Islamism and Critical Theory on the Left (2003) ====
Written in the aftermath of the September 11 attacks, the book examines political Islam, Western secularism, and the limitations of leftist theory in responding to contemporary forms of violence and global conflict. Drawing on both Western critical theory and Arab intellectual debates, the book argues for a rethinking of universalism of the Enlightenment and calls for dialogue across political and cultural divides. The concerns of this book led to her membership in the UNESCO-initiated, Brazilian-supported Académie de la Latinité, under the directorship of Candido Mendes, Rio de Janeiro. Respecting the diversity of cultures that characterizes the history of Latin countries, the Académie held yearly meetings with Arab intellectuals and others, in order to counter the ideological polarization that followed the September 11, 2001 attacks on the United States.

==== Hegel, Haiti, and Universal History (2009) ====
In her seminal work that influenced debates in philosophy, post-colonial studies, and global intellectual history, Buck-Morss reinterprets the Hegelian schema of the master-slave dialectic in light of the Haitian Revolution (1791-1804). Expanding on her earlier essay "Hegel and Haiti" (2000), she argues that Hegel must have known about the successful slave revolt in Saint-Domingue through contemporary reports, and that his philosophical account of freedom recognized the historical context of the anti-colonial revolt.

The book challenges Eurocentric readings of modern philosophy by situating a foundational moment of European thought within a global anti-colonial revolutionary framework. Buck-Morss contends that universal history must be understood as shaped by events outside Europe, and that the Haitian Revolution and other global developments, especially in the colonial world, should be recognized as central to modern political consciousness rather than peripheral to it.

==== Revolution Today (2019) ====
In this book, Buck-Morss asks the question: “What does revolution look like in the first decades of the 21st century?”. With the use of photographic evidence, she shows the reader how people continue to act politically after the mass political disillusionment of the 20th century. By reflecting on recent global uprisings and mass protests, Buck-Morss attempts to reflect and reframe spontaneous collective action outside of institutionalized party organization or ideological orthodoxy and conformity.

==== Year 1: A Philosophical Recounting (2021) ====
Buck-Morss reexamines the origin stories of Western civilization based on the most recent historical research, discovering serious distortions in readings and translations of first-century texts (by Flavius Josephus, Philo of Alexandria, and John of Patmos) on which politically charged understandings of the past have been based. All three writers thought of themselves as Jews. All wrote in koinē, a word we translate as “Greek,” but in first-century Greek means “common.” All relied on the same koinē version of the Pentateuch/Torah. The project extends her method of universal history by tracing the origins of an arbitrarily conceived first century A.D., challenging the claims of contemporary collectives to exclusionary ownership of historical time and territory.

==== Seeing–Making–Room for Thought (2024) ====
Seeing–Making–Room for Thought (2024) is a collaborative project by Buck-Morss with graphic artist Kevin McCaughey and publisher Adam Michaels. The title refers to the relationship between thinking and the forms of presentation. Buck-Morss and her collaborators experiment with layout, typography, and image-text relations as part of their argument about how knowledge is produced and shared.

=== Editorial and public engagement ===
Buck-Morss has served on the editorial boards of several international journals, including October, Diacritics, Constellations, Journal of Visual Culture, and New Benjamin Studies. She has lectured widely across Europe, the Americas, the Middle East, and Asia, and was curator for InSite2000, working specifically with Krzysztof Wodiczko on the “Tijuana Projection, 2001,” a public video projection at the Centro Cultural Tijuana, Mexico. She has lectured internationally in major cultural institutions including Tate Modern, Centre Pompidou, Courtauld Institute, DIA Center for the Arts, MoMA, MACBA, Mohile Prashant Center for the Performing Arts, and CIMAM’s 2010 meeting in Shanghai. For Documenta (13) in Kessel, Germany, she worked together with the Palestinian artist Emily Jacir.

Alongside her research, Buck-Morss has been an active teacher and public intellectual. She has held visiting positions and given lectures at universities and cultural institutions around the world, including museums, art schools, and research institutes. Her work regularly appears in interdisciplinary journals like Cultural Critique, New Left Review, Journal of Visual Culture, Radical Philosophy, October, and Critical Inquiry.

== Personal life ==
She was born Susan Felmly Buck on August 8, 1942. For 13 years she attended St. John’s School, a day-school in Mountain Lakes, N.J., founded in 1923 by an Episcopalian minister, and directed after his death by his German, Quaker widow, Theresa L. Wilson, a Hunter College graduate. Her teachers were suburban wives who had graduated from college and taught the small classes for which this school (later named the Wilson School) was known. Among the eight girls in her graduating class, four had been with her since kindergarten. While college was the expected next step, it took several years before she determined to train for an academic profession. In 1972, she married Elliott Reed Morss. When they divorced in 1977, she retained the name Buck-Morss, under which she had begun to publish.

At Cornell she met the physicist Eric Dean Siggia. They married in 1984. It was through his work that she spent time in Paris, and first travelled to Moscow in 1988, where his colleagues at the Landau Institute for Theoretical Physics introduced her to Valery Podoroga at the Institute of Philosophy, Soviet Academy of Sciences, a meeting that began a sustained collaboration with Moscow philosophers over the period of 1988-1993. She moved to New York City after Eric Siggia joined the faculty of Rockefeller University, where he is Brinning Professor of Physical, Mathematical, and Computational Biology, specializing in biophysics and developmental biology, using stem cells.
