= Novel: A Forum on Fiction =

Academic journal

- Discipline: Literature
- Language: English
- Edited by: Kevin McLaughlin

Publication details
- History: 1967-present
- Publisher: Duke University Press (United States)
- Frequency: Triannually

Standard abbreviations
- ISO 4: Novel

Indexing
- ISSN: 0029-5132 (print); 1945-8509 (web)
- JSTOR: 00295132
- OCLC no.: 1760877

Links
- Journal homepage; Journal page at publisher's website

Novel: A Forum on Fiction is a triannual peer-reviewed academic journal published by Duke University Press. The editor-in-chief is Kevin McLaughlin (Brown University). It is the official journal of the Society for Novel Studies. The journal was established in 1967 and publishes essays "concerned with the novel's role in engaging and shaping the world".

== Abstracting and indexing ==
The journal is abstracted and indexed in Humanities and Social Sciences Index Retrospective, Humanities Index Online, Humanities Index Retrospective, Literature Online, OmniFile Full Text, and Periodicals Index Online.
