= Federico Castigliano =

Professor of French and Italian Studies

Federico Castigliano is a Professor of French and Italian Studies. He has taught in France for eight years and has worked at University of Toulon, University of Clermont-Ferrand and University of Nantes. Castigliano is a member of the research department of the University of Paris IV and participated in the research group project of the Sorbonne University in Paris. He currently teaches at Beijing International Studies University in China.

== Education ==
He received his Ph.D. in Comparative Literature from the University of Turin in Italy in 2008.

== Research work ==
Castigliano's researches center on the relationship between art, literature and city spaces. His approach is to integrate narrative with performing arts, describing the “Flâneur” as the key figure of a new aesthetic practice.

Castigliano has authored several works and has held numerous lectures at universities across Europe and China. His book Flâneur. The Art of Wandering the Streets of Paris (2017), where he describes the city wandering as a form of art, has been translated into four languages.
