= The Painter of Modern Life =

1863 essay by Charles Baudelaire

"The Painter of Modern Life" (French: "Le Peintre de la vie moderne") is an essay written by French poet, essayist, and art critic Charles Baudelaire (1821–1867). It was composed sometime between November 1859 and February 1860, and was first published in three installments in the French morning newspaper Le Figaro in 1863: first on November 26, and then on the 28th, and finally on December 3. The essay inspired young artists to break away from academic art and to discover and innovate new approaches for representing and portraying the ephemeral nature of the modern world.

== See also ==
- Constantin Guys (1802–1892)
- Flâneur

== Bibliography ==
- Baudelaire, Charles (1965)[1964]. The Painter of Modern Life, and other Essays. Trans. and Ed. by Jonathan Mayne. Phaidon. OCLC 276691.
- Benjamin, Walter. (2006). The Writer of Modern Life: Essays on Charles Baudelaire. Belknap Press of Harvard University Press. ISBN 9780674022874.
- Bowlby, Rachel (Winter 2014). "Half Art": Baudelaire's "Le Peintre de la vie moderne". Daedalus. 143 (1): 46-53. doi:10.1162/DAED_a_00252.
- Galeinson, David W.; Weinberg, Bruce A. (2001). "Creating Modern Art: The Changing Careers of Painters in France from Impressionism to Cubism". American Economic Review. 91 (4): 1063. doi:10.1257/aer.91.4.1063.
- Howells, Bernard (2017). Baudelaire: Individualism, Dandyism and the Philosophy of History. Routledge. ISBN 9781900755016.
- Raser, Timothy (2017). Baudelaire and Photography: Finding the Painter of Modern Life. Taylor & Francis. ISBN 9781351574389.
- Richardson, Joanna (1994). Baudelaire: The Life of Charles Baudelaire. St. Martin's Press. ISBN 0312114761
