= Fritz Thurstone =

Frederick "Fritz" Thurstone (1932–2005) was a pioneer in ultrasound technology, largely in the design of transducers for ultrasound imaging.

He earned a B.S. degree in Physics from the University of North Carolina at Chapel Hill in 1953 and M.S. and Ph.D degrees both in electrical engineering from North Carolina State University in 1957 and 1961 respectively.
