= 1960 Pittsburgh Panthers football team =

American college football season

1960 Pittsburgh Panthers football
- Conference: Independent
- Record: 4–3–3
- Head coach: John Michelosen (6th season)
- Home stadium: Pitt Stadium

1960 Eastern major college football independents records
	Conf.			Overall
Team	W	L	T	W		L		T
No. 19 Syracuse		–		7	–	2	–	0
No. 16 Penn State		–		7	–	3	–	0
Army		–		6	–	3	–	1
Holy Cross		–		6	–	4	–	0
Pittsburgh		–		4	–	3	–	3
Boston University		–		3	–	5	–	2
Boston College		–		3	–	6	–	1
Colgate		–		2	–	7	–	0
Villanova		–		2	–	8	–	0
Rankings from AP poll

The 1960 Pittsburgh Panthers football team represented the University of Pittsburgh as an independent during the 1960 college football season. Led by sixth-year head coach John Michelosen, the Panthers compiled a record of 4–3–3. The team played home games at Pitt Stadium in Pittsburgh.

== Schedule ==
Date	Opponent	Rank	Site	Result	Attendance	Source
September 17	at UCLA	No. 7	Los Angeles Memorial Coliseum; Los Angeles, CA	L 7–8	36,056	
September 24	No. 6 Michigan State	No. 17	Pitt Stadium; Pittsburgh, PA	T 7–7	46,140	
October 1	at Oklahoma		Oklahoma Memorial Stadium; Norman, OK	L 14–15	48,835-52,000	
October 8	Miami (FL)		Pitt Stadium; Pittsburgh, PA	W 17–6	29,455	
October 15	West Virginia		Pitt Stadium; Pittsburgh, PA (rivalry)	W 42–0	31,813	
October 22	at TCU		Amon G. Carter Stadium; Fort Worth, TX	T 7–7	25,000	
October 29	at No. 3 Syracuse		Archbold Stadium; Syracuse, NY (rivalry)	W 10–0	41,872	
November 5	at Notre Dame	No. 14	Notre Dame Stadium; Notre Dame, IN (rivalry)	W 20–13	55,696	
November 12	Army	No. 12	Pitt Stadium; Pittsburgh, PA	T 7–7	45,498	
November 19	Penn State		Pitt Stadium; Pittsburgh, PA (rivalry)	L 3–14	45,023	
Rankings from AP Poll released prior to the game

== Preseason ==
Snow delayed the start of spring practice two weeks, and on a snowy Thursday, March 24, Coach John Michelosen welcomed 70 hopeful Panthers (including 18 returning lettermen) to his sixth spring session. The Panthers lost 13 lettermen to graduation. Michelosen's main concerns were replacing the quarterback (Ivan Toncic), and both co-captain tackles (Ken Montanari and Bill Lindner). 1958 letterman quarterback Ed Sharockman, who dropped out of school for a year, re-entered Pitt and was eligible to play in the fall. Dave Kraus, Ed Clark and Jim Traficant were the other quarterback candidates. Guard Bill Guzik was switched to tackle and lettermen Dick Mills competed with 2 juniors (Elmer Merkovsky, Bob Budavich) for the remaining spot at tackle. Sessions ran from Tuesday through Saturday until the April 9 intra-squad game. The final day kicked off with a track meet against Navy, followed by the football game between the Blues and Whites. Local Pittsburgh TV Channel 11 carried all the action. Coach John Michelosen sat in the TV booth as commentator. Navy defeated the Panthers 66–65 on the track, and the Blues defeated the Whites 16–14 on the gridiron.

Fifty-five players were invited to pre-season training camp beginning on August 23 at Allegheny College in Meadville, PA. The squad spent 12 days at camp, returning to Pitt on September 1 for school registration. They continued to prepare on campus for their opening game against UCLA. Mike Ditka was voted captain.

== Game summaries ==
=== at UCLA ===
Week 1: Pitt at UCLA

Team	1	2	3	4	Total
Pitt	7	0	0	0	7
• UCLA	0	0	0	8	8

- Date: September 17, 1960
- Location: Los Angeles Memorial Coliseum
  Los Angeles, CA
- Game start: 8:15 p.m.
- Elapsed time: 2 hours 15 minutes
- Game attendance: 35,056
- Game weather: mild
- Referee: James M. Cain

Scoring summary
1	PITT	Jim Cunningham 1-yard plunge (Fred Cox kick)	PITT 7–0
4	UCLA	Ezell Singleton 4-yard run (Bill Kilmer run))	UCLA 8–7

The Pittsburgh Panthers opened their 1960 season with a trip to Los Angeles, CA to play the UCLA Bruins. This was their third meeting, and Pitt led the series 2–0. Second-year coach Bill Barnes' squad had 25 returning lettermen. All-America candidate Billy Kilmer led the Bruins offense.

The Panthers were flown to Los Angeles by TWA on Friday morning. Upon arrival, the squad was treated to a few hours at Disneyland before check-in at the Ambassador Hotel. In the evening the team went to the USC versus Oregon State football game. The Saturday schedule was calisthenics, breakfast, rest, pre-game dinner and game at 8:15 p.m. The game was televised back to Pittsburgh on Channel 11 WPXI with Mal Alberts announcing.

The Panthers led for more than 59 minutes but ended up losing 8–7 to the delight of the 35,056 Bruins fans. Pitt took the opening kick-off and held the ball more than 7 minutes on a 68-yard touchdown drive. Fullback Jim Cunningham went over from the 1-yard line. Fred Cox booted the extra point and Pitt led 7–0. The game turned into a punting duel until the final UCLA drive. UCLA gained possession on their 49-yard line with over 4 minutes left in the game. Bruins' halfback Bill Kilmer passed for 3 first downs and halfback Ezell Singleton ran for one. Singleton finished the drive with a 4-yard run over right guard, and Kilmer ran in for the two point conversion. In desperation, Pitt was able to move the ball to the UCLA 41-yard line, but Fred Cox's field goal from midfield was short as time ran out.

UCLA out gained the Panthers 275 yards to 188. Fred Cox led the Panthers with 36 yards rushing on 9 carries. Pitt quarterback David Kraus completed 5 of 8 passes for only 29 yards. Bill Kilmer and Ezell Singleton led the Bruins by each rushing for 49 yards. Kilmer completed 10 of 18 passes for 138 yards and threw one interception.

The Pitt starting lineup for the game against UCLA was Mike Ditka (left end), Bob Budavich (left tackle), Paul Hodge (left guard), Andy Kuzineski (center), Larry Vignali (right guard), Dick Mills (right tackle), Ron Delfine (right end), David Kraus (quarterback), Bob Clemens (left halfback), Fred Cox (right halfback) and Jim Cunningham (fullback). Substitutes appearing in the game for Pitt were Steve Jastrzembski, Heywood Haser, Elmer Merkovsky, Tom Brown, John Draksler, Dick Matyus, Ralph Conrad, Bob Guzik, David Walker, Ed Sharockman, Jim Traficant, Chuck Reinhold, John Yaccino, Mike Frasca and Lou Slaby.

=== Michigan State ===
Week 2: Michigan State at Pitt

Team	1	2	3	4	Total
Michigan State	0	7	0	0	7
Pitt	0	7	0	0	7

- Date: September 24, 1960
- Location: Pitt Stadium
  Pittsburgh, PA
- Game start: 1:30 p.m.
- Game attendance: 46,140
- Game weather: warm and sunny
- Referee: Howard Wirtz (Cincinnati)

Scoring summary
2	PITT	Mike Ditka 12-yard pass from Dave Kraus (Fred Cox kick)	PITT 7–0
4	MSU	Jason Harness 66-yard pass from Tom Wilson (Art Brandstatter kick))	TIE 7–7

On September 24, the Panthers welcomed Duffy Daugherty's Michigan State Spartans for Youth Day at the Stadium. The Spartans led the all-time series 4–0, and they had out scored the Panthers 106–41. The Spartans roster contained future pro footballers – Herb Adderley, Fred Arbanas, Gary Ballman and Wayne Fontes.

First string Pitt guard Regis Coustillac was back in the line-up. Center Dick Matyus and guard Larry Vignali were injured and did not play. Andy Kuzneski started at center, and Ralph Conrad replaced Vignali.

In front of 46,140 fans the Pitt Panthers and Michigan State Spartans played to a 7–7 tie. Late in the second period the Panthers scored on a 4-play, 65-yard drive. Mike Ditka caught a 12-yard touchdown toss from Dave Kraus and Fred Cox booted the extra point. One minute and 9 seconds remained in the first half. On the third play after the kick-off Tom Wilson threw a 66-yard touchdown pass to Jason Harness and Art Brandstatter's placement tied the game. Brandstatter missed two field goals in the second half. The Panthers offense was stymied by the Spartan defense and the game ended in a tie.

Michigan State had 19 first downs and 359 total yards, while the Panthers managed 11 first downs and 173 total yards. The Spartans lost 75 yards on 5 penalties, had 1 pass intercepted and lost 1 fumble. Panthers quarterback Dave Kraus completed 7 of 13 passes for 87 yards and 1 touchdown. MSU's Tom Wilson completed 10 of 24 passes for 178 yards and 1 touchdown. They each threw an interception.

The Pitt starting lineup for the game against Michigan State was Mike Ditka (left end), Bob Budavich (left tackle), Regis Coustillac (left guard), Andy Kuzineski (center), Ralph Conrad (right guard), Dick Mills (right tackle), Ron Delfine (right end), David Kraus (quarterback), Bob Clemens (left halfback), Fred Cox (right halfback) and Jim Cunningham (fullback). Substitutes appearing in the game for Pitt were Steve Jastrzembski, Heywood Haser, Elmer Merkovsky, Gary Kaltenbach, Paul Hodge, John Holzbach, Frank Scrip, Tom Brown, John Draksler, Bob Guzik, David Walker, Ed Sharockman, Jim Traficant, Chuck Reinhold, Ray Tarasi, John Yaccino, Mike Frasca and Lou Slaby.

=== at Oklahoma ===
Week 3: Pitt at OKLA

Team	1	2	3	4	Total
Pitt	0	6	8	0	14
• OKLA	7	0	0	8	15

- Date: October 1, 1960
- Location: Oklahoma Memorial Stadium
  Norman, OK
- Game start: 2:00 p.m.
- Game attendance: 52,000
- Game weather: cloudy and warm
- Referee: William P. Astle

Scoring summary
1	OKLA	Ronny Payne 30-yard pass from Jimmy Carpenter (Karl Milstead kick)	OKLA 7–0
2	PITT	Fred Cox 33-yard pass from Jim Traficant (run failed)	OKLA 7–6
3	PITT	Cox 3-yard run (Mike Ditka pass from Traficant)	PITT 14–7
4	OKLA	Don Dickey 5-yard run (Bennett Watts run)	OKLA 15–14

The Panthers second road trip was to Norman, OK to play the defending Big Seven Conference champion Oklahoma Sooners. Veteran coach Bud Wilkinson was in his 14th season, and his Sooners were 0–1, having lost to Northwestern the previous week. Oklahoma led the all-time series 3–0–1.

Coach Michelosen took his squad to Norman on Friday, and worked out on Owen Field in the afternoon. He used the same line-up that started the Michigan State game. Pitt was favored by a point, but Oklahoma had not lost 2 games in a row under Coach Wilkinson.

For the second time in three weeks the Panthers were beaten by a late two-point conversion, 15–14. The Sooners scored first on a 30-yard touchdown pass from Jimmy Carpenter to Ronny Payne in the opening quarter. Karl Milstead added the placement for a 7–0 lead. Pitt answered with an drive to the Oklahoma 10-yard line, but lost the ball on downs. The Sooners then advanced to the Pitt 3-yard line, where they too, turned the ball over on downs. Pitt ran the ball out to the 30-yard line. Jim Traficant replaced Ed Sharockman at quarterback. Traficant completed 3 straight passes, the final a 33-yard toss to Fred Cox for the score. The two-point conversion failed, and the Sooners led at halftime 7–6. Early in the third period Cox intercepted a Carpenter pass on the Oklahoma 32-yard line. It took the Panthers 4 plays to score. Cox ran in off-tackle from the 3-yard line. A pass from Traficant to Mike Ditka for two points put the Panthers in front 14–7. In the final quarter, Oklahoma end Phil Lohmann blocked a Pitt punt and recovered on the Panthers 11-yard line. Don Dickey scored on second down. The Sooners lined up for a placement, but it was a fake and Bennett Watts ran around right end for the two points to put the Sooners back in front 15–14. Pitt had 11 minutes to answer, but the Oklahoma defense kept them out of the end zone.

Pitt gained 372 total yards and had 23 first downs. Oklahoma gained 315 total yards and had 17 first downs. Traficant completed 8 of 15 passes for 102 yards and 1 touchdown. Bob Clemens led the Pitt rushers with 83 yards on 12 carries. Ronnie Hartline led Oklahoma with 91 yards on 15 carries.

The Pitt starting line-up for the game against Oklahoma was Mike Ditka (left end), Bob Budavich (left tackle), Regis Coustillac (left guard), Andy Kuzineski (center), Ralph Conrad (right guard), Dick Mills (right tackle), Ron Delfine (right end), David Kraus (quarterback), Bob Clemens (left halfback), Fred Cox (right halfback) and Jim Cunningham (fullback). Substitutes appearing in the game for Pitt were Steve Jastrzembski, Dave Mastro, Heywood Haser, David Walker, Gary Kaltenbach, Ed Fornadel, Paul Hodge, John Holzbach, Richard Taylor, John Draksler, Bob Guzik, Ed Sharockman, Jim Traficant, Chuck Reinhold, John Yaccino, Mike Frasca and Lou Slaby.

=== Miami (FL) ===
Week 4: Miami (FL) at Pitt

Team	1	2	3	4	Total
Miami (FL)	0	0	0	6	6
• Pitt	0	0	0	17	17

- Date: October 8, 1960
- Location: Pitt Stadium
  Pittsburgh, PA
- Game start: 10:00 a.m.
- Game attendance: 29,455
- Game weather: chilly and sunny
- Referee: Gerald F. Hogan

Scoring summary
4	PITT	Fred Cox 30-yard field goal	PITT 3–0
4	PITT	Bob Clemens 3-yard run (Cox kick)	PITT 10–0
4	PITT	Jim Cunningham 13-yard run (Cox kick)	PITT 17–0
4	MIAMI	BillMIller 26-yard pass from Eddie Johns (run failed)	PITT 17–6

On October 8, the Panthers welcomed Andy Gustafson's Miami Hurricanes for the annual High School and Band Day game. The Hurricanes were 1–0 after beating North Carolina (29–12) in their opening game. Miami led the all-time series 3–2, and Pitt had never beaten the Canes at home. Since the Pirates were playing at the Yankees in the World Series, the game was played at 10:00 a.m. so the baseball fans could get home and be in front of their TVs for the opening pitch. Pitt was favored by a touchdown.

Coach Michelosen named sophomore Jim Traficant the starting quarterback.

29,455 fans got out of bed early to see the Panthers. Carl Apone wrote in the Post-Gazette: There were a lot of mixed up people at the Stadium yesterday.They watched a college football game at 10 a.m.; had hot dogs and hot chocolate for breakfast; and waved Pittsburgh Pirate baseball pennants.”

Pitt finally was able the beat the Hurricanes on their home field 17–6. The game was scoreless for 3 quarters. Fred Cox missed a 32-yard field goal in the second quarter, but after a 61-yard, 12-play drive to open the final quarter, he converted a 30-yarder to put Pitt on the scoreboard. Miami turned the ball over when quarterback Bobby Weaver fumbled while being tackled by Pitt end Heywood Haser. Mike Ditka recovered on the Miami 18-yard line. An illegal substitution penalty moved the ball to the 9-yard line. Jim Clemens scored on a run through right tackle on second down. Cox booted the extra point and Pitt led 10–0. Pitt kicked off and the defense forced a Miami punt. The punter slipped on the turf, which, again gave Pitt possession on the 18-yard line. On second down, Jim Cunningham ran through right guard for the final 13 yards. Cox's placement made it 17–0 Pitt. Miami answered with a 12-play, 75-yard drive. Bill Miller caught a 26-yard touchdown pass from Eddie Johns with 7 seconds remaining in the game. Johns was tackled trying to run around right end for the two point conversion.

Statistically, Miami had 14 first downs to Pitt's 13, but Pitt out-gained the Hurricanes 252 yards to 178. Fred Cox averaged 46.4 yards on 5 punts. Jim Traficant completed 6 of 11 passes for 95 yards.

The Pitt starting line-up for the game against Miami was Mike Ditka (left end), Bob Budavich (left tackle), Regis Coustillac (left guard), Andy Kuzineski (center), Ralph Conrad (right guard), Dick Mills (right tackle), Ron Delfine (right end), Jim Traficant (quarterback), Bob Clemens (left halfback), Fred Cox (right halfback) and Jim Cunningham (fullback). Substitutes appearing in the game for Pitt were Steve Jastrzembski, Joe Latvis, Heywood Haser, David Walker, Gary Kaltenbach, Ed Fornadel, Elmer Merkovsky, Dave Mastro, Paul Hodge, Tom Brown, John Holzbach, John Draksler, Bob Guzik, Larry Vignali, Ed Sharockman, David Kraus, Chuck Reinhold, John Yaccino, Ray Tarasi, John Chisdak and Lou Slaby.

=== West Virginia ===
Week 5: West Virginia at Pitt

Team	1	2	3	4	Total
West Virginia	0	0	0	0	0
• Pitt	14	14	7	7	42

- Date: October 15, 1960
- Location: Pitt Stadium
  Pittsburgh, PA
- Game start: 1:30 p.m.
- Game attendance: 31,813
- Game weather: cloudy and mild
- Referee: J. D. Hedrick

Scoring summary
1	PITT	Bob Clemens 12-yard pass from Jim Traficant (Fred Cox kick)	PITT 7–0
1	PITT	Traficant 1-yard run (Cox kick)	PITT 14–0
2	PITT	Bob Clemens 16-yard run (Cox kick)	PITT 21–0
2	PITT	Ray Tarasi 26-yard intercepted lateral (Cox kick)	PITT 28–0
3	PITT	Mike Ditka 34-yard pass from Traficant (Cox kick)	PITT 35–0
4	PITT	Mike Frasca 40-yard run (Cox kick)	PITT 42–0

On October 15, the 1960 edition of the Backyard Brawl was Homecoming Day at Pitt. The Mountaineers led by first-year coach Gene Corum were 0–3–1 and had been out-scored 85–14. The Mountaineers had not won since beating Pitt (23–15) the previous year. Pitt led the all-time series 38–13–1, but WVU won two of the previous three games played.

Two hours before the game, fullback Jim Cunningham was taken to the hospital with a 102 temperature and flu-like symptoms. Lou Slaby replaced Cunningham in the line-up, and Heywood Haser started at right end.

In front of 31,813 Homecoming fans, the Panthers dominated the hapless Mountaineers 42–0. Five Panthers scored touchdowns (Bob Clemens (2), Jim Traficant, Ray Tarasi, Mike Ditka, Mike Frasca), and Fred Cox was perfect on 6 placements. The Panthers earned 20 first downs and gained 400 total yards. The Mountaineers managed 5 first downs on 140 total yards. Halfback Bob Clemens led the Panthers with 74 yards on 7 carries. Pitt quarterback Jim Traficant completed 5 of 8 passes for 82 yards and 2 touchdowns.

Pitt halfback Ray Tarasi scored his first touchdown on a 26-yard interception. On the ensuing kick-off, he broke his arm while tackling Mountaineers' halfback Tom Woodeshick, and was out for the rest of the season. Chuck Reinhold pulled his hamstring and John Yaccino was on concussion watch.

The Pitt starting line-up for the game against West Virginia was Mike Ditka (left end), Bob Budavich (left tackle), Regis Coustillac (left guard), Andy Kuzineski (center), Ralph Conrad (right guard), Dick Mills (right tackle), Heywood Haser (right end), Jim Traficant (quarterback), Bob Clemens (left halfback), Fred Cox (right halfback) and Lou Slaby (fullback). Substitutes appearing in the game for Pitt were Steve Jastrzembski, Joe Latvis, Ron Delfine, David Walker, John Kuprok, Gary Kaltenbach, Ed Fornadel, Elmer Merkovsky, Dave Mastro, Paul Hodge, Dennis Dvorchak, Tom Brown, John Holzbach, John Draksler, Bob Guzik, Larry Vignali, Dick Matyus, William Fisher, Ed Sharockman, David Kraus, Ed Clark, Chuck Reinhold, John Yaccino, Ray Tarasi, John Chisdak, Andy Kasic, Carmen Ronca, Ed Ferdinand and Mike Frasca.

=== at TCU ===
Week 6: Pitt at TCU

Team	1	2	3	4	Total
Pitt	0	0	0	7	7
TCU	7	0	0	0	7

- Date: October 22, 1960
- Location: Amon G. Carter Stadium
  Fort Worth, TX
- Game start: 2:00 p.m.
- Game attendance: 25,000
- Game weather: warm
- Referee: Jim Buchanan

Scoring summary
1	TCU	Sonny Gibbs 1-yard plunge (R. E. Dodson kick)	TCU 7–0
4	PITT	John Yaccino 5-yard pass from Jim Traficant (Fred Cox kick)	TIED 7–7

For their third road trip (and first of three straight), the Panthers traveled to Fort Worth, Texas to play the Horned Frogs of TCU. The Panthers flew into Fort Worth on Friday late-morning, and when they deplaned, they were greeted by the TCU marching band and cheerleaders, the Mayor of Fort Worth, and members of the Sportworthians and Jaycees. The Panthers were gifted western hats and made honorary citizens of Fort Worth.

TCU was the defending co-champion of the Southwest Conference. Abe Martin's squad was 2–2–1. The Frogs beat Pitt 13–3 in their only other meeting. All-American Bob Lilly anchored the TCU line and Sonny Gibbs was the quarterback.

In front of 25,000 fans, the Panthers defense gave up a touchdown in the opening period. A 52-yard, 11-play drive ended with Sonny Gibbs scoring on a quarterback sneak from the 2-foot line. R.E. Dodson added the extra point for a 7–0 TCU lead. The Frogs got the ball back and drove to the Panthers 11-yard line, but lost the ball on downs. On first down Panther back Ed Sharockman raced 75 yards to the TCU 14-yard line. TCU guard Richard Holden intercepted Jim Traficant's pass to end the Panthers possession. In the first half Pitt gained 85 total yards but only 1 first down. On their opening possession of the second half the Panthers advanced to the TCU 20-yard line before losing the ball on downs. They forced a punt and drove inside the TCU 10-yard line, but the Frogs defense sacked the quarterback on successive plays to regain possession. On second down Pitt guard Paul Hodge sacked Gibbs and forced a fumble that was recovered by Jim Cunningham on the TCU 24-yard line. The Panthers scored 4 plays later on a 5-yard pass from Traficant to John Yaccino. With more than 7 minutes remaining in the game Coach Michelosen opted to kick the extra point instead of going for two. Fred Cox's boot tied the game. Neither team was able to score, but the game ended with a brawl. Pitt and TCU have not met on the gridiron since.

The Pitt starting line-up for the game against TCU was Mike Ditka (left end), Bob Budavich (left tackle), Regis Coustillac (left guard), Andy Kuzineski (center), Ralph Conrad (right guard), Dick Mills (right tackle), Ron Delfine (right end), David Kraus (quarterback), Bob Clemens (left halfback), Fred Cox (right halfback) and Jim Cunningham (fullback). Substitutes appearing in the game for Pitt were Steve Jastrzembski, Heywood Haser, Gary Kaltenbach, Ed Fornadel, Dave Mastro, Paul Hodge, John Holzbach, John Draksler, Larry Vignali, Ed Sharockman, Jim Traficant, Chuck Reinhold, John Yaccino, Lou Slaby and Mike Frasca.

=== at Syracuse ===
Week 7: Pitt at Syracuse

Team	1	2	3	4	Total
• Pitt	7	0	3	0	10
Syracuse	0	0	0	0	0

- Date: October 29, 1960
- Location: Archbold Stadium
  Syracuse, NY
- Game start: 1:30 p.m.
- Game attendance: 41,872
- Game weather: fair and mild
- Referee: Bailey Finn (Holy Cross)

Scoring summary
1	PITT	Jim Traficant 14-yard run (Fred Cox kick)	PITT 7–0
3	PITT	Fred Cox 38-yard field Goal	PITT 10–0

The second leg of the 3-game road trip was to Syracuse, NY to play Coach Ben Schwartzwalder's defending National Champs and current #3 ranked Orangemen. The Orange were 5–0 and led by two All-Americans: running back Ernie Davis and end Fred Mautino. Pitt led the all-time series 8–5–2, but had lost the past three games. Syracuse was a 10-point favorite.

In front of a record 41,872 fans, the Pitt defense shut out the Syracuse eleven, while the Pitt offense managed 10 points to halt the Orangemen's 16 game win streak by a score of 10–0. Syracuse fumbled on their first possession, but Pitt was forced to punt. Then Pitt center Andy Kuzneski intercepted a Dave Starette pass and ran to the Syracuse 15-yard line. On second down Jim Traficant ran through right tackle for the touchdown. Fred Cox converted the extra point. After only 5 minutes and 35 seconds of play Pitt lead 7–0. In the second quarter, the Panthers drove 92 yards to the Syracuse 2-yard line. A hand-off was bobbled and the ball rolled into the end zone where it was recovered by Syracuse back Dick Easterly for a touchback. The Orangemen advanced into Pitt territory (38-yard line) once in the first half. Early in the third period, Ernie Davis fumbled and Pitt recovered on the Orange 25-yard line. The Syracuse defense held and Cox booted a 38-yard field goal to increase the lead to 10–0. Pitt spent most of the remainder of the game in Syracuse territory, but could not score.

Pitt gained 12 first downs; totaled 195 yards of offense; lost three fumbles; and had 1 pass intercepted. Syracuse was held to 5 first downs and 138 total yards. The Pitt defense held Ernie Davis to 37 yards on 13 carries. Plus, they intercepted 3 passes and recovered 3 fumbles. Fred Cox led the Panthers rushing attack with 43 yards on 7 carries, followed by Jim Cunningham with 42 yards on 15 carries and Bob Clemens with 35 yards on 9 carries.

The Pitt starting line-up for the game against Syracuse was Mike Ditka (left end), Bob Budavich (left tackle), Regis Coustillac (left guard), Andy Kuzineski (center), Ralph Conrad (right guard), Dick Mills (right tackle), Ron Delfine (right end), Jim Traficant (quarterback), Bob Clemens (left halfback), Fred Cox (right halfback) and Jim Cunningham (fullback). Substitutes appearing in the game for Pitt were Steve Jastrzembski, Heywood Haser, David Walker, John Kuprok, Gary Kaltenbach, Ed Fornadel, Dave Mastro, Paul Hodge, John Holzbach, Larry Vignali, Ed Sharockman, David Kraus, Chuck Reinhold, John Yaccino and Lou Slaby.

=== at Notre Dame ===
Week 8: Pitt at Notre Dame

Team	1	2	3	4	Total
• Pitt	7	0	13	0	20
Notre Dame	0	0	7	6	13

- Date: November 5, 1960
- Location: Notre Dame Stadium
  Notre Dame, IN
- Game start: 2:00
- Game attendance: 55,696
- Game weather: cloudy and cold
- Referee: Tony Skover

Scoring summary
1	PITT	Jim Cunningham 1-yard run (Fred Cox kick)	PITT 7–0
3	PITT	Fred Cox 2-yard run (Cox kick blocked)	PITT 13–0
3	PITT	Chuck Reinhold 12-yard run (Cox kick)	PITT 20–0
3	ND	Angelo Dabiero 9-yard run (Bill Henneghan kick)	PITT 20–7
4	ND	Max Burnell 12-yard pass from George Haffner (Henneghan kick missed)	PITT 20–13

The final road game was at South Bend, IN to play Notre Dame. The Irish won their opening game and then lost 5 straight. Coach Joe Kuharich's roster had future pro stars and coaches: Myron Pottios, Daryle Lamonica, George Sefcik, George Haffner and Nick Buoniconti. Notre Dame led the all-time series over Pitt 16–9–1, but Pitt won the past two games.

In front of 55,696 fans, the Pittsburgh Panthers handed the Fighting Irish their 6th loss in a row by the score of 20–13. It was the first time in Notre Dame football history that they had lost 6 straight. Similar to the Syracuse victory, the Panthers scored early in the opening quarter. Pitt kicked off and forced a punt. The Panthers gained possession on their 42-yard line but a penalty moved them back to the 34-yard line. A 58-yard pass from Ed Sharockman to Mike Ditka advanced the ball to the Irish 8-yard line. On fourth down Jim Cunningham plunged 1-yard for the touchdown. Fred Cox kicked the extra point and Pitt led 7–0 after 5 minutes of action. On their next possession, the Panthers moved to the Irish 12-yard line, but Jim Traficant threw an interception. The remainder of the first half was a punting duel. Pitt chose to kick-off in the second half. Cox intercepted George Haffner's pass on third down and carried the ball 39 yards to the 2-yard line. Cox scored around end on the next play, but missed the extra point. Then Pitt regained possession, but Cox missed a 44-yard field goal. Finally, the Panthers forced another punt and gained possession on their own 37-yard line. Pitt's offense went 63 yards in 6 plays ending with a Chuck Reinhold 13-yard run around right end. Cox converted and Pitt led 20–0. Notre Dame answered late third quarter with a 13-play, 70-yard drive. Halfback Angelo Dabiero ran the final 9 yards untouched around left end. Bill Henneghan booted the extra point and Pitt's lead was cut to 13. Late in the final period Notre Dame scored again on a 12-yard pass play from George Haffner to Max Burnell. Henneghan's placement was wide. The Irish were able to regain possession, but the Panthers intercepted and ran out the clock.

Pitt became the third team, along with Purdue and Michigan State, to beat the Irish 10 times.

The Pitt starting line-up for the game against Notre Dame was Mike Ditka (left end), Gary Kaltenbach (left tackle), John Draksler (left guard), Andy Kuzineski (center), Larry Vignali (right guard), Dick Mills (right tackle), Heywood Haser (right end), Ed Sharockman (quarterback), Bob Clemens (left halfback), Fred Cox (right halfback) and Jim Cunningham (fullback). Substitutes appearing in the game for Pitt were Steve Jastrzembski, Ron Delfine, David Walker, Bob Budavich, Ed Fornadel, Dave Mastro, Regis Coustillac, John Holzbach, Tom Brown, Ralph Conrad, Jim Traficant, David Kraus, Chuck Reinhold, John Yaccino and Lou Slaby.

=== Army ===
Week 9: Army at Pitt

Team	1	2	3	4	Total
Army	0	0	7	0	7
Pitt	7	0	0	0	7

- Date: November 12, 1960
- Location: Pitt Stadium
  Pittsburgh, PA
- Game start: 1:30 p.m.
- Game attendance: 45,498
- Game weather: sunny
- Referee: Francis Brennan (Canisius)

Scoring summary
1	PITT	Ed Sharockman 39-yard interception return (Fred Cox kick)	PITT 7–0
4	ARMY	Al Rushatz 1-yard run (Tom Blanda kick)	TIED 7–7

On November 12, the Panthers played the Army Cadets. Coach Dale Hall's Cadets were 6–2 on the season. Pitt led the all-time series 5–2–1. The Cadets arrived Friday and worked out on the Norwin High School field. They housed at the Jacktown Motel in Irwin until game time. An hour before game time 1,100 Cadets paraded into the Stadium and presented their Band Box revue.

Coach Michelosen was concerned about Pitt being a touchdown favorite: “ We'd better forget about Penn State until after tomorrow's game, or we can forget about a lot of other things....This Army team is tough, and that's not just a lot of smoke either. They got caught off balance by Nebraska, sure, but they showed what they had when they played Syracuse last week.” The Associated Press All-America Board listed end Mike Ditka as the East's number one candidate for All-America honors.

Coach Michelosen was right. The Panthers were fortunate to come away with a 7–7 tie. Army gained 20 first downs and held the Panthers to 4. Pitt and Army each lost 4 fumbles. Army intercepted 2 Pitt passes and the Panthers defense intercepted 1. As in the previous 2 games, the Panthers managed to score in the first quarter. Ed Sharockman intercepted a Ted Blanda pass and raced 39-yards for the touchdown. Fred Cox kicked the extra point and Pitt led 7–0. Army answered early in the third quarter. They took the kick-off and drove to the Pitt 2-yard line. Quarterback Blanda fumbled into the end zone and Mike Ditka recovered for a touchback. On third down Jim Cunningham fumbled and the Cadets recovered on the Pitt 27-yard line. Army scored in 5 plays with Al Rushatz plunging over from the 1-yard line. Blanda added the extra point and the score was tied 7–7 with 25 minutes remaining. Fumbles, penalties, interceptions and punts frustrated both teams for the next 24 minutes. With 39 seconds remaining in the game, Army lined up for a 23-yard field goal. Blanda's kick hit the cross bar “and fell harmlessly to the sod.” On second down Ed Sharockman threw a “Hail Mary” that was intercepted by Glen Adams and returned to the Pitt 16-yard line as time expired.

Pitt quarterback, Ed Sharockman completed 1 of 5 passes for 38 yards and threw 2 interceptions. Blanda set an Army record by completing 24 of 35 passes for 235 yards. John Yaccino led the Panthers in rushing with 22 yards on 7 carries. Rushatz led the Army with 57 yards on 22 carries.

The Pitt starting line-up for the game against Army was Mike Ditka (left end), Bob Budavich (left tackle),Tom Brown (left guard), Andy Kuzineski (center), Larry Vignali (right guard), Dick Mills (right tackle), Ron Delfine (right end), Ed Sharockman (quarterback), Bob Clemens (left halfback), Fred Cox (right halfback) and Jim Cunningham (fullback). Substitutes appearing in the game for Pitt were Steve Jastrzembski, Heywood Haser, Gary Kaltenbach, Paul Hodge, Regis Coustillac, Bob Guzik, Ralph Conrad, Dick Matyus, Jim Traficant, David Kraus, Chuck Reinhold, John Yaccino, Mike Frasca and Lou Slaby.

=== Penn State ===
Week 10: Penn State at Pitt

Team	1	2	3	4	Total
• Penn State	0	0	0	14	14
Pitt	3	0	0	0	3

- Date: November 19, 1960
- Location: Pitt Stadium
  Pittsburgh, PA
- Game start: 1:30 p.m.
- Game attendance: 45,023
- Game weather: sunny and cool
- Referee: David Buchanan (Temple)

Scoring summary
1	PITT	Fred Cox 35-yard field goal	PITT 3–0
3	PSU	Jimmy Kerr 30-yard pass from Galen Hall ( Henry Oppenheimer kick missed)	PSU 6–3
4	PSU	Bob Mitinger 3-yard pass from Dick Hoak (Dave Hayes run)	PSU 14–3

On November 19, the Panthers and Penn State met for the 60th time. Pitt led the all-time series 33–23–3. Coach Rip Engle's squad was 5–3. Engle substituted two full lineups. One was led by quarterback Galen Hall, and the second was led by Dick Hoak. State needed a win to get a Liberty Bowl bid.

Pitt had 8 seniors playing their final college game: Ron Delfine, Ed Fornadel, Jim Cunningham, Paul Hodge, Chuck Reinhold, Mike Ditka, Dick Mills and Dave Walker. Substitute quarterback Jim Traficant had a pinched nerve in his shoulder and did not play.

The Nittany Lions beat the Panthers 14–3 with a fourth quarter two touchdown rally. Penn State back Jimmy Kerr fumbled the opening kick-off, and Pitt's Chuck Reinhold recovered on the State 14-yard line. The State defense held for three downs, and Pitt opted for a 35-yard Fred Cox field goal. The score remained 3–0 until the final quarter. The Pitt offense had moved the ball 80 yards (from their 2-yard line to the State 18-yard line). On fourth down they tried a fake field goal, but Don Jonas intercepted Ed Sharockman's pass and ran to the State 27-yard line. The State offense went 73-yards for their first score. Even though Pitt had 12 men on the field, quarterback Galen Hall was able to complete a 30-yard pass to Jimmy Kerr for the touchdown. Henry Oppenheimer missed the extra point, but State led 6–3. Pitt managed one first down and then punted. Kerr returned the punt 40 yards to the Pitt 42. A piling on penalty moved the ball to Panthers 27-yard line. The second unit led by Dick Hoak scored on a 3-yard pass from Hoak to Bob Mitinger. A fullback draw play to Dave Hayes added the final two points.

The Pitt starting line-up for the game against Penn State was Mike Ditka (left end), Gary Kaltenbach (left tackle), Paul Hodge (left guard), Andy Kuzineski (center), Larry Vignali (right guard), Dick Mills (right tackle), Ron Delfine (right end), Ed Sharockman (quarterback), Chuck Reinhold (left halfback), Fred Cox (right halfback) and Jim Cunningham (fullback). Substitutes appearing in the game for Pitt were Steve Jastrzembski, Heywood Haser, Bob Budavich, Tom Brown, John Holzbach, Bob Guzik, Ralph Conrad, David Walker, John Kuprok, David Kraus, John Yaccino, Ed Clark, Mike Frasca, John Chisdak and Lou Slaby.

== Postseason ==
On November 17, the Pittsburgh Post-Gazette reported that university chancellor Edward H. Litchfield would extend Michelosen's tenure as coach at Pitt for an indefinite time period. "John Michelosen is our football coach—indefinitely," the Chancellor said. “He will continue to work here on the same basis as all of our other staff members, and the only bond to which he will be held is our good faith in him, and his in us.....If he ever decides to quit coaching, it would give him an opportunity for reassignment to some other University area.”

Mike Ditka was named consensus All-America. He was also chosen to play in the East-West Shrine Game at Kezar Stadium on December 31 in San Francisco, California and the Hula Bowl on January 8, 1961 at Honolulu Stadium in Honolulu, Hawaii. Guard Paul Hodge and end Ron Delfine played in the North-South Shrine Game on December 26 in Miami, Florida. Fullback Jim Cunningham and tackle Dick Mills played in the All-American Bowl on December 24 in Tucson, Arizona and in the Copper Bowl on December 31 in Phoenix, Arizona. John Michelosen was on the coaching staff for the All-American Bowl.

== Coaching staff ==
1960 Pittsburgh Panthers football staff
Coaching staff: John Michelosen – head coach; Jack Wiley – head line coach; Victor Fusia –backfield coach; Carl DePasqua –halfback coach; Robert Timmons – defensive coach; Walter Cummins – center coach; Steve Petro – freshman coach; Lou Cecconi – freshmen coach	Support staff: Frank Carver– athletic director; Walter P. Cummins – assistant athletic director; Carroll Cook– athletic publicity director; Frank Carver – graduate manager; Howard Waite – trainer; Roger McGill – trainer; Chuck McDermott – student manager

== Roster ==
1960 Pittsburgh Panthers football roster
Player	Position	Games	Weight	Height	Class	Prep School	Hometown
Ed Adamchik	guard	0	215	6 ft 1 in	sophomore	Johnstown H. S.	Johnstown, PA
Ed Billy	halfback	0	175	5 ft 11 in	sophomore	Clairton-Bullis Prep H. S.	Clairton, PA
Ernest Borghetti	tackle	0	235	6 ft 4 in	sophomore	Ursuline H. S.	Youngstown, OH
John Botula	end	0	195	6 ft	sophomore	South Hills H. S.	Pittsburgh, PA
Tom Brown	guard	6	1968	6 ft	sophomore	Munhall H. S.	Munhall, PA
Robert Budavich	tackle	10	230	6 ft 2 in	junior	Mt. Lebanon H. S.	Castle Shannon, PA
Dennis Chillinsky	quarterback	0	190	6 ft	sophomore	Plum H. S.	Plum Borough, PA
John Chisdak	halfback	2	185	6 ft	sophomore	Scranton Central H. S.	Scranton, PA
Edwin Clark, Jr.	quarterback	2	170	5 ft 11 in	sophomore	Indiana H. S.	Indiana, PA
Bob Clemens*	halfback	9	197	6 ft 1 in	junior	Munhall H. S.	West Mifflin, PA
Ralph Conrad*	guard	10	210	5 ft 11 in	sophomore	Altoona H. S.	Altoona, PA
Regis Coustillac*	guard	8	219	6 ft 2 in	junior	Ursuline H. S.	Youngstown, OH
Fred Cox*	halfback	10	194	5 ft 11 in	junior	Monongahela H. S.	Monongahela, PA
Jim Cunningham*	fullback	9	212	5 ft 11 in	senior	Connellsville H. S.	Connellsville, PA
Ron Delfine*	end	10	190	6 ft	senior	Canonsburg H. S.	Canonsburg, PA
Mike Ditka*	end	10	215	6 ft 3 in	senior	Aliquippa H. S.	Aliquippa, PA
John Draksler*	guard	7	215	6 ft 1 in	sophomore	United H. S.	Brush Valley, PA
Dennis Dvorchak	guard	1	210	6 ft 2 in	junior	South Union H. S.	Uniontown, PA
Edmund Ferdinand	halfback	1	185	5 ft 10 in	sophomore	Hazleton-Fort Union H. S.	Hazleton, PA
William Fisher, Jr.	guard	1	212	6 ft 1 in	sophomore	Mt. Lebanon H. S.	Mt. Lebanon, PA
Ed Fornadel*	tackle	6	220	6 ft 1 in	senior	Beaverdale H. S.	Beaverdale, PA
Michael Frasca*	fullback	7	183	6 ft 1 in	junior	Altoona-Bullis H. S.	Altoona, PA
John Geho	end	0	192	6 ft	sophomore	Stowe H. S.	Stowe Township, PA
Bob Guzik*	guard	7	222	6 ft 2 in	junior	Cecil Twp. H. S.	Lawrence., PA
Heywood Haser*	end	10	205	6 ft	junior	New Kensington H. S.	New Kensington, PA
Paul Hodge*	center	9	208	6 ft 2 in	senior	Portage H. S.	Portage, PA
John Holzbach*	center	8	215	6 ft 3 in	sophomore	South. H. S.	Youngstown, OH
John Hunter	center	0	208	6 ft 1 in	sophomore	East H. S.	Youngstown, OH, PA
Robert Jamison	guard/tackle	0	205	6 ft	sophomore	Greensburg H. S.	Greensburg, PA
Stave Jaztrzembski*	end	10	203	6 ft 3 in	junior	Vandergrift H. S.	Vandergrift, PA
Gary Kaltenbach*	tackle	9	238	6 ft 2 in	sophomore	Clairton H. S.	Clairton, PA
Andy Kasic	halfback	1	165	5 ft 10 in	junior	West Newton H. S.	West Newton, PA
David Kraus*	quarterback	10	191	6 ft 2 in	junior	Tridelphia H. S.	Wheeling, WVA
John Kuprok	end	3	188	6 ft 1 in	junior	Duquesne H. S.	Duquesne, PA
Andrew Kuzneski*	center	10	209	6 ft 2 in	junior	Indiana Joint H. S.	Indiana, PA
Joe Kuzneski	end	0	209	6 ft 3 in	sophomore	Indiana Joint H. S.	Indiana, PA
Joseph Latvis	end	2	185	6 ft	junior	Nashua H. S.	Nashua, NH
Marvin Lippincott	halfback	0	193	6 ft	sophomore	Phillipsburg H. S.	Riegelsville, NJ
Robert Long	end	0	190	6 ft 3 in	sophomore	Sharon H.S.	Sharon, PA
John Maczuzak	center	0	220	6 ft 5 in	sophomore	Ellsworth H.S.	Ellsworth, PA
Charles Marranca	tackle	0	210	6 ft 1in	senior	Pittston H. S.	Pittston, PA
Dave Mastro*	end/tackle	6	218	6 ft 5 in	sophomore	Baldwin H. S.	Baldwin, PA
Dick Matyus	center	3	215	6 ft 3 in	junior	Shannock Valley H. S.	Yatesboro, PA
Elmer Merkovsky, Jr.	tackle	4	220	6 ft 2 in	junior	Wilmerding H. S.	Wilmerding, PA
Dick Mills*	tackle	10	226	6 ft 3 in	senior	Beaver H. S.	Beaver, PA
Leonard Mosser	fullback	0	190	6 ft 2 in	sophomore	Harrisville H. S.	Harrisville, WV
Robert Ostrosky	center/tackle	0	213	6 ft	sophomore	Uniontown H. S.	New Salem, PA
Chuck Reinhold*	halfback	10	173	6 ft 1 in	senior	Mt. Lebanon H. S.	Mt. Lebanon, PA
Carmen Ronca	fullback	1	190	6 ft 1 in	sophomore	Linton H. S.	Schenectady, NY
Richard Sanker	quarterback	0	175	6 ft	sophomore	Johnstown Central H. S.	Johnstown, PA
Frank Scrip	fullback	1	192	6 ft	sophomore	California. H. S.	Roscoe, PA
Ed Sharockman*	quarterback	10	184	6 ft	junior	St. Clair H. S.	St. Clair, PA
Lou Slaby*	fullback	10	215	6 ft 3 in	sophomore	Salem H. S.	Salem, OH
Jerry Straub	quarterback	0	175	6 ft	sophomore	Vinson H. S.	Huntington, WV
Ray Tarasi	halfback	3	176	5 ft 10 in	junior	Springdale-Kiski H. S.	Harmarville, PA
Richard Taylor	guard	1	210	6 ft	sophomore	Crafton H. S.	Crafton PA
Jim Traficant*	quarterback	9	190	6 ft	sophomore	Cardinal Mooney H. S.	Youngstown, OH
Lawrence Vignali*	guard	8	218	5 ft 10 in	junior	Masontown H. S.	Masontown, PA
David Walker*	end	8	210	6 ft 1 in	senior	Mt. Lebanon H. S.	Mt. Lebanon, PA
Frank Walton	tackle	0	210	5 ft 11 in	sophomore	Mt. Lebanon H. S.	Mt. Lebanon, PA
Regis Welsh	halfback	0	150	5 ft 5 in	junior	Perry H. S.	Pittsburgh, PA
John Yaccino*	halfback	10	177	5 ft 11 in	sophomore	Hazleton H.S.	Hazleton, PA
* Letterman

== Individual scoring summary ==
1960 Pittsburgh Panthers scoring summary
Player	Touchdowns	Extra points	Two pointers	Field goals	Safety	Points
Fred Cox	3	15	0	3	0	42
Jim Cunningham	3	0	0	0	0	18
Bob Clemens	3	0	0	0	0	18
Mike Ditka	2	0	1	0	0	14
Jim Traficant	2	0	0	0	0	12
Ed Sharockman	1	0	0	0	0	6
Chuck Reinhold	1	0	0	0	0	6
John Yaccino	1	0	0	0	0	6
Mike Frasca	1	0	0	0	0	6
Ray Tarasi	1	0	0	0	0	6
Totals	18	15	1	3	0	134

== Statistical leaders ==
Pittsburgh's individual statistical leaders for the 1960 season include those listed below.

=== Rushing ===
Player	Attempts	Net yards	Yards per attempt	Touchdowns
Fred Cox	82	333	4.1	2
Jim Cunningham	89	303	3.4	3
Bob Clemens	74	349	4.7	2
Ed Sharockman	53	257	4.8	1

=== Passing ===
Player	Attempts	Completions	Interceptions	Comp %	Yards	Yds/Comp	TD
Jim Traficant	57	29	2	50.8	407	14.0	4
Dave Kraus	39	17	2	43.5	149	8.8	1
Ed Sharockman	33	10	6	30.3	234	23.4	0

=== Receiving ===
Player	Receptions	Yards	Yds/Recp	TD
Mike Ditka	11	229	20.8	2
Fred Cox	11	177	16.1	1
Steve Jastrzemski	7	125	17.9	0
Bob Clemens	7	75	10.7	1

=== Kickoff returns ===
Player	Returns	Yards	Yds/Return	TD
John Yaccino	7	127	18.1	0
Mike Ditka	3	25	8.3	0

=== Punt returns ===
Player	Returns	Yards	Yds/Return	TD
Ed Sharockman	10	117	11.7	0
Bob Clemens	9	74	8.2	0
John Yaccino	5	64	12.8	0

== Team players drafted into the NFL ==
The following Panthers were chosen in the 1961 NFL draft.

Player	Position	Round	Pick	NFL club
Mike Ditka	Tight end	1	5	Chicago Bears
Dick Mills	Linebacker	3	34	Detroit Lions
Jim Cunningham	Back	3	39	Washington Redskins
Ed Sharockman	Running back	5	57	Minnesota Vikings
Fred Cox	Running back	8	110	Cleveland Browns
Bob Clemens	Back	10	133	Baltimore Colts
Paul Hodge	Linebacker	13	178	Detroit Lions
Steve Jastrzembski	Back	17	231	Baltimore Colts
James Traficant	Quarterback	20	276	Pittsburgh Steelers

== Team players drafted into the AFL ==
The following Panthers were chosen in the 1961 AFL draft.

Player	Position	Round	Pick	NFL club
Mike Ditka	tight end	1	8	Houston Oilers
Dick Mills	guard	9	69	Dallas Texans
Jim Cunningham	fullback	14	109	New York Titans
Ed Sharockman	defensive back	22	174	Dallas Texans
Fred Cox	kicker	28	221	New York Titans
