= Stew Barber =

American football player and executive (1939–2025)

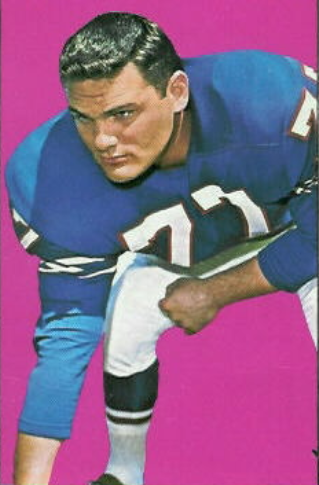
- Topps card for Barber in 1966

No. 64, 77
- Positions: Tackle, guard, linebacker

Personal information
- Born: June 14, 1939; Bradford, Pennsylvania, U.S.
- Died: June 11, 2025 (aged 85); Mt. Pleasant, South Carolina, U.S.
- Listed height: 6 ft 2 in (1.88 m)
- Listed weight: 250 lb (113 kg)

Career information
- High school: Bradford Area
- College: Penn State
- NFL draft: 1961: 3rd round, 30th overall pick
- AFL draft: 1961: 4th round, 25th overall pick

Career history

Playing
- Buffalo Bills (1961–1969)

Coaching
- New York Stars / Charlotte Hornets (1974) Offensive line coach; Chicago Winds (1975) Offensive line coach

Operations
- Buffalo Bills (1979–1982) General manager / VP of administration

Awards and highlights
- 2× AFL champion (1964, 1965); 5× AFL All-Star (1963–1967); Second-team AFL All-Time Team; All-American (1960); First-team All-Eastern (1960)

Career AFL statistics
- Games played: 125
- Games started: 115
- Stats at Pro Football Reference
- Executive profile at Pro Football Reference

Stewart Clair Barber (June 14, 1939 – June 11, 2025) was an American professional football player who was an offensive tackle for the Buffalo Bills of the American Football League (AFL). He was twice named first-team All-AFL and was chosen to play in five consecutive AFL All-Star Games. He was on two AFL championship teams. He was later an executive for the Bills in the National Football League (NFL). He played college football for the Penn State Nittany Lions.

== Early life ==
Barber was born on June 14, 1939, in Bradford, Pennsylvania to Arthur Clair and Jeanne Stewart Barber. He attended Bradford High School (now Bradford Area High School), where he played tackle on the football team. It is also reported he played end for four years in high school, on offense and defense. He also played basketball in high school. He broke his father's high school shot put record.

== College career ==
He accepted a football scholarship from Penn State University; having also received full scholarship offers as a basketball player. He was a flanker (end) as a freshman, as well as a defensive end; and was a second team end as a sophomore. The 6 ft 3 in (1.91 m) 220 lb (99.8 kg) Barber was switched to tackle before his junior season (1959) at Penn State, and played his junior and senior years at tackle. He was a two-way tackle and/or two-way player at tackle and end. He started on the 1959 Penn State team that defeated the University of Alabama, 7–0, in the first Liberty Bowl.

As a 6 ft 3, 233 lb (105.7 kg) senior in 1960, he played 305 minutes out of a possible 540 minutes in nine regular season games. Penn State coach Rip Engle considered Barber fair at tackle in 1959, but one of the very best in 1960, and the Penn State player with the best professional prospects. In December 1960, he started on the 1960 Penn State team that defeated the University of Oregon in the Liberty Bowl, 41–12.

In 1960, Barber was named to the Associated Press (AP) first-team All-East team, as well as to the AP's first-team All-Pennsylvania College football team. Future Hall of Fame tight end Mike Ditka was also named to both of those first teams. United Press International (UPI) also named Barber to its All-East team. Barber also received several All-American honors as an offensive tackle as a senior. He was chosen to play in the Blue Gray Classic that year. He was selected as one of the college all-stars to play in the first All American Bowl in June 1961.

He graduated with a degree in business administration.

== Professional career ==
Barber was selected by the Buffalo Bills in the fourth round (25th overall) of the 1961 AFL draft and was also selected by the Dallas Cowboys in the third round (30th overall) of the 1961 NFL draft. He was drafted two rounds after future Hall of Fame left guard Billy Shaw, whom Barber would play next to on the Bills' offensive line from 1962 to 1969. On January 8, 1961, he signed with the Bills. It was expected the 6 ft 3 in 230 lb (104.3 kg) Barber would play guard or defensive end with the Bills, because of his aggressiveness, quickness and agility.

In the Bills' 1961 training camp, the rookie Barber originally played guard, tackle and defensive end. Due to a need at the linebacker position, coach Buster Ramsay converted Barber to linebacker in August; and Barber impressed Ramsay with his play at right linebacker. During his 1961 rookie season, Barber started eight of 14 games in which he played at outside linebacker. He had three interceptions and two quarterback sacks. In a November 19 game against the Denver Broncos he returned an interception for a 21-yard touchdown.

In 1962, the Bills new head coach Lou Saban moved Barber to left offensive tackle, protecting quarterbacks Warren Rabb, Jack Kemp and Al Dorow. From 1962 to 1968, Barber started in every game Bills game. In 1967, he started some games at left guard, rather than left tackle, replacing the injured Billy Shaw at the start of the season. In his final season, 1969, Barber started nine of the 13 games in which he played; including some time at left guard for Shaw who had a leg injury in 1969.

Barber was selected to play in the AFL All-Star game for five consecutive seasons (1963 to 1967). In 1963 and 1964, the Associated Press (AP) and United Press International (UPI) named him first-team All-AFL and the Newspaper Enterprise Association (NEA) named him second-team All-AFL in 1963 and 1965, and first-team in 1964. The AP named him second-team All-AFL in 1966. He helped the Bills win two straight AFL Championships in 1964 and 1965.

Barber announced his retirement shortly after the 1969 season ended.

== Legacy and honors ==
From 1961 to 1969, Barber played in 125 consecutive games for the Bills, starting 115 or 119 consecutive games. He missed only one game in his nine-year career when a back injury caused him to miss the last game of the 1969 season. In 1970, he was named to the second-team American Football League All-Time Team. In 1984, he was selected to the Bills' Silver Anniversary All-Time Team. Former teammate Charley Ferguson said Barber played his best in the most important games.

On April 15, 1967, the city of Bradford honored Barber by holding Stew Barber Day.

== Coach, executive and scout ==
After his playing career ended, Barber became a coach in the World Football League (WFL) in 1974. He was the offensive line coach under head coach Babe Parilli for the New York Stars, who moved during the 1974 season to Charlotte, North Carolina (becoming the Charlotte Hornets). In 1975, he was the offensive line coach for the WFL’s Chicago Winds.

Barber worked in the Buffalo Bills front office from 1975 to 1983 as a college scout (1975), assistant general manager (1976) and administrative vice president and general manager. He was the Bills vice president in charge of administration and general manager from 1979 to early 1983. On March 14, 1983, the Bills reported that he resigned from the team. It has also been reported that when Bills owner Ralph Wilson hired Kay Stephenson to coach the Bills in March 1983, Stephenson wanted the Bills to replace Barber as a condition of his coming on as coach. Even before that, it was reported that Barber had been the object of complaints from a number of players and others over his management and financial decisions. It is also reported, however, that during Barber’s tenure he had a difficult relationship with head coach Chuck Knox who had power over salary negotiations rather than Barber.

== Personal life and death ==
Early in his career with the Bills, Barber, his wife Vicki (Serwatka) Barber and their family lived in Buffalo during the offseason, where Barber worked during six offseasons at Darling & Company, a meat rendering business. Barber and Vicki met while both were students at Penn State, and married during her junior year. They had been married for 63 years at the time of his death in 2025. At the time of his retirement after the 1969 season, Barber was a partner in Voelker Analysis, a food and chemical laboratory.

After retiring from professional football altogether, he went into private business and moved to Mt. Pleasant, South Carolina.

Barber died on June 11, 2025, at the age of 85 at his home in Mt. Pleasant. He was survived by his wife, three daughters and four grandchildren. Two other daughters predeceased him.

== See also ==
- List of American Football League players
