= 1960 Syracuse Orangemen football team =

American college football season

1960 Syracuse Orangemen football
- Conference: Independent

Ranking
- AP: No. 19
- Record: 7–2
- Head coach: Ben Schwartzwalder (12th season)
- Captains: Al Bemiller; Fred Mautino; Richard Reimer
- Home stadium: Archbold Stadium

1960 Eastern major college football independents records
	Conf.			Overall
Team	W	L	T	W		L		T
No. 19 Syracuse		–		7	–	2	–	0
No. 16 Penn State		–		7	–	3	–	0
Army		–		6	–	3	–	1
Holy Cross		–		6	–	4	–	0
Pittsburgh		–		4	–	3	–	3
Boston University		–		3	–	5	–	2
Boston College		–		3	–	6	–	1
Colgate		–		2	–	7	–	0
Villanova		–		2	–	8	–	0
Rankings from AP poll

The 1960 Syracuse Orangemen football team represented Syracuse University as an independent during the 1960 college football season. The Orangemen were led by 12th-year head coach Ben Schwartzwalder and played their home games at Archbold Stadium in Syracuse, New York. Syracuse finished the regular season with a record of 7–2 and ranked 19th in the AP Poll. The university administration ruled against accepting a bowl invite saying that the "season was long enough". They were not invited to a bowl game.

Junior halfback Ernie Davis continued to garner national attention, earning consensus All-American honors while rushing for 877 yards and 8 touchdowns.

== Schedule ==
Date	Opponent	Rank	Site	Result	Attendance	Source
September 24	Boston University	No. 2	Archbold Stadium; Syracuse, NY	W 35–7	25,000	
October 1	at No. 5 Kansas	No. 2	Memorial Stadium; Lawrence, KS	W 14–7	40,000	
October 8	at Holy Cross	No. 1	Fitton Field; Worcester, MA	W 15–6	18,000	
October 15	No. 20 Penn State	No. 4	Archbold Stadium; Syracuse, NY (rivalry)	W 21–15	40,617	
October 22	at West Virginia	No. 3	Mountaineer Field; Morgantown, WV (rivalry)	W 45–0	20,000	
October 29	Pittsburgh	No. 3	Archbold Stadium; Syracuse, NY (rivalry)	L 0–10	41,872	
November 5	vs. Army	No. 9	Yankee Stadium; Bronx, NY	L 6–9	66,000	
November 12	Colgate	No. 17	Archbold Stadium; Syracuse, NY (rivalry)	W 46–6	23,000	
November 18	at Miami (FL)	No. 14	Miami Orange Bowl; Miami, FL	W 21–14	45,271	
Rankings from AP Poll released prior to the game; Source:
