= Jerry Edwards =

American sports coach

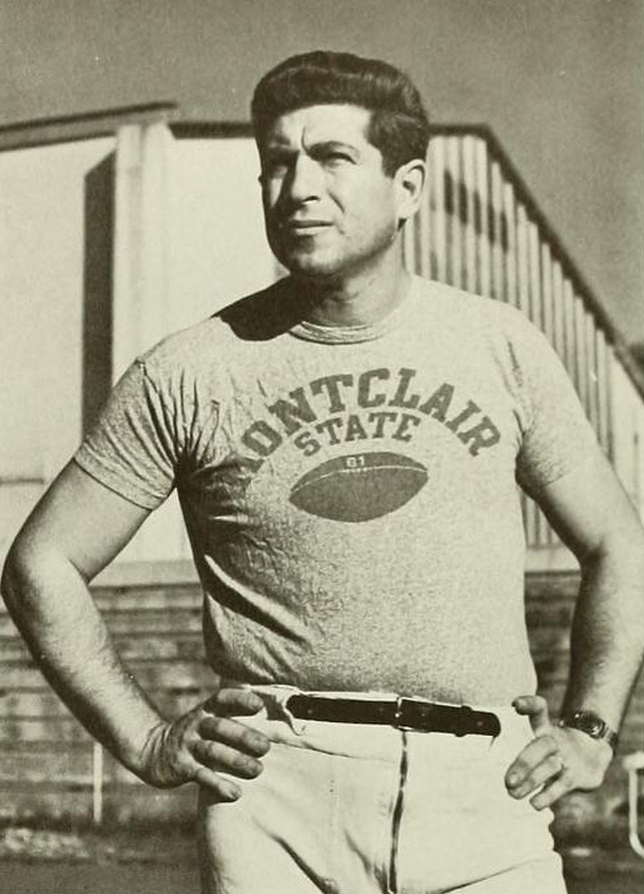

Biographical details
- Born: April 2, 1925
- Died: March 21, 2010 (aged 84); Port Jefferson, New York, U.S.

Coaching career (HC unless noted)
- 1958–1959: Montclair State (assistant)
- 1960–1965: Montclair State

Head coaching record
- Overall: 36–12

Gerald Edwards (April 2, 1925 – March 21, 2010) was an American football, basketball, and a track and field coach. He served as the head football coach at Montclair State University in Upper Montclair, New Jersey from 1960 to 1965, compiling a record of 36–12. Edwards also coached Montclair State's track and field and junior varsity basketball teams. He died in 2010 after a short illness.

== Head coaching record ==
| Year | Team | Overall | Conference | Standing | Bowl/playoffs |
|---|---|---|---|---|---|
Montclair State Indians (NCAA College Division independent) (1960–1965)
| 1960 | Montclair State | 8–0 | | | |
| 1961 | Montclair State | 6–2 | | | |
| 1962 | Montclair State | 6–2 | | | |
| 1963 | Montclair State | 5–4 | | | |
| 1964 | Montclair State | 7–0 | | | |
| 1965 | Montclair State | 4–4 | | | |
| Montclair State: | | 36–12 | | | |
| Total: | | 36–12 | | | |
