= Stan Zajdel =

American football player and coach (1927–2017)

Biographical details
- Born: April 17, 1927
- Died: September 22, 2017 (aged 90)

Playing career
- 1949–1950: St. Bonaventure
- 1951: Pittsburgh Steelers
- Position: Halfback

Coaching career (HC unless noted)
- 1953: Cardinal Mindszenty HS (NY)
- 1954: Aquinas Institute (NY)
- 1955–1959: Dayton (assistant)
- 1960–1962: Dayton
- 1966: Merchant Marine (OB)
- 1967: Pittsburgh (OB)
- 1977: C. W. Post (assistant)

Head coaching record
- Overall: 5–25 (college)

Stanley Zajdel (April 17, 1927 – September 22, 2017) was an American football player and coach.

== Playing career ==
Zajdel played college football at St. Bonaventure University in Allegany, New York during the 1949 and 1950 seasons. He was listed as a member of the Pittsburgh Steelers in 1951.

== University of Dayton ==
Zajdel served as the head football coach at the University of Dayton from 1960 to 1962. He previously served as an assistant at Dayton from 1955 to 1959, during which time he coached future Notre Dame coach Gerry Faust.

== Death ==
Zajdel died in 2017 at the age of 90.

== Head coaching record ==
=== College ===
Year	Team	Overall	Conference	Standing	Bowl/playoffs
Dayton Flyers (NCAA University Division independent) (1960–1962)
1960	Dayton	1–9			
1961	Dayton	2–8			
1962	Dayton	2–8			
Dayton:		5–25			
Total:		5–25			
