= Larry Peace =

American football player (1917–2009)

No. 34, 2
- Position: Halfback

Personal information
- Born: February 13, 1917; Bradford, Pennsylvania, U.S.
- Died: January 12, 2009 (aged 91); Bradford, Pennsylvania, U.S.
- Listed height: 5 ft 11 in (1.80 m)
- Listed weight: 185 lb (84 kg)

Career information
- High school: Bradford (Pennsylvania)
- College: Pittsburgh (1936–1938)
- NFL draft: 1939: undrafted

Career history
- Buffalo Indians (1940); Brooklyn Dodgers (1941)

Awards and highlights
- 2× National champion (1936–1937)
- Stats at Pro Football Reference

Lawrence W. Peace (February 13, 1917 – January 12, 2009) was an American professional football halfback who played one season with the Brooklyn Dodgers of the National Football League (NFL). He played college football at the University of Pittsburgh.

== Early life and college ==
Lawrence W. Peace was born on February 13, 1917, in Bradford, Pennsylvania. He played high school football at Bradford Area High School as a fullback. Bradford High was undefeated from 1933 to 1935, with yearly records of 9–0, 9–0, and 10–0.

He was a member of the Pittsburgh Panthers of the University of Pittsburgh from 1936 to 1938. He was not on the varsity team his freshman year in 1936 when the team won the Rose Bowl and were selected national champion by the contemporary Boand math system and retroactively years later by the Football Researchers poll and Houlgate math system. He was then a two-year varsity letterman from 1937 to 1938. The 1937 Panthers were consensus national champions.

== Professional career ==
Peace played in six games, starting four, for the Buffalo Indians of the American Football League in 1940 and converted one of one extra points.

He signed with the Brooklyn Dodgers of the National Football League in 1941. He appeared in seven games for the Dodgers during the 1941 season, rushing four times for two yards and converting one of one extra points. He was then drafted into the United States Army during World War II and spent the next four years in the Army.

== Personal life ==
Peace was later an amateur golfer and football official. He died on January 12, 2009, in Bradford at the age of 91.
