= 1960 Boston University Terriers football team =

American college football season

1960 Boston University Terriers football
- Conference: Independent
- Record: 3–5–2
- Head coach: Steve Sinko (4th season)
- Home stadium: Boston University Field

1960 Eastern major college football independents records
	Conf.			Overall
Team	W	L	T	W		L		T
No. 19 Syracuse		–		7	–	2	–	0
No. 16 Penn State		–		7	–	3	–	0
Army		–		6	–	3	–	1
Holy Cross		–		6	–	4	–	0
Pittsburgh		–		4	–	3	–	3
Boston University		–		3	–	5	–	2
Boston College		–		3	–	6	–	1
Colgate		–		2	–	7	–	0
Villanova		–		2	–	8	–	0
Rankings from AP poll

The 1960 Boston University Terriers football team was an American football team that represented Boston University as an independent during the 1960 college football season. In its fourth season under head coach Steve Sinko, the team compiled a 3–5–2 record and was outscored by a total of 172 to 130.

== Schedule ==
Date	Opponent	Site	Result	Attendance	Source
September 17	at Penn State	Beaver Stadium; University Park, PA	L 0–20	23,000	
September 24	at Syracuse	Archbold Stadium; Syracuse, NY	L 7–35	25,000	
October 1	Holy Cross	Boston University Field; Boston, MA	W 20–14	14,223	
October 8	No. 1 Ohio	Boston University Field; Boston, MA	L 6–36	7,100	
October 15	George Washington	Boston University Field; Boston, MA	T 0–0	5,800	
October 22	at Connecticut	Memorial Stadium; Storrs, CT	L 14–16	13,168	
October 29	UMass	Boston University Field; Boston, MA	W 20–7	10,500	
November 5	at West Virginia	Mountaineer Field; Morgantown, WV	T 7–7	3,000	
November 12	at Boston College	Alumni Stadium; Chestnut Hill, MA (rivalry)	L 14–23	22,500	
November 19	at Buffalo	War Memorial Stadium; Buffalo, NY	W 42–14	8,137	
Rankings from AP Poll released prior to the game; Source:
