= 1960 Penn State Nittany Lions football team =

American college football season

1960 Penn State Nittany Lions football

Liberty Bowl champion

Liberty Bowl, W 41–12 vs. Oregon
- Conference: Independent

Ranking
- AP: No. 16
- Record: 7–3
- Head coach: Rip Engle (11th season)
- Captain: Hank Oppermann
- Home stadium: Beaver Stadium

1960 Eastern major college football independents records
	Conf.			Overall
Team	W	L	T	W		L		T
No. 19 Syracuse		–		7	–	2	–	0
No. 16 Penn State		–		7	–	3	–	0
Army		–		6	–	3	–	1
Holy Cross		–		6	–	4	–	0
Pittsburgh		–		4	–	3	–	3
Boston University		–		3	–	5	–	2
Boston College		–		3	–	6	–	1
Colgate		–		2	–	7	–	0
Villanova		–		2	–	8	–	0
Rankings from AP poll

The 1960 Penn State Nittany Lions football team represented the Pennsylvania State University as an independent during the 1960 college football season. The team was coached by Rip Engle and played its home games in Beaver Stadium in University Park, Pennsylvania.

== Schedule ==
Date	Opponent	Rank	Site	Result	Attendance	Source
September 17	Boston University	No. 19	Beaver Stadium; University Park, PA	W 20–0	23,000	
October 1	No. 19 Missouri^{†}	No. 20	Beaver Stadium; University Park, PA	L 8–21	35,500	
October 8	at No. 18 Army		Michie Stadium; West Point, NY	W 27–16	27,150	
October 15	at No. 4 Syracuse	No. 20	Archbold Stadium; Syracuse, NY (rivalry)	L 15–21	40,617	
October 22	at Illinois		Memorial Stadium; Champaign, IL	L 8–10	51,459	
October 29	West Virginia		Beaver Stadium; University Park, PA (rivalry)	W 34–13	35,600–37,715	
November 5	Maryland		Beaver Stadium; University Park, PA (rivalry)	W 28–9	30,126	
November 12	at Holy Cross		Fitton Field; Worcester, MA	W 33–8	14,586	
November 19	at Pittsburgh		Pitt Stadium; Pittsburgh, PA (rivalry)	W 14–3	45,023	
December 17	vs. Oregon	No. 15	Philadelphia Municipal Stadium; Philadelphia, PA (Liberty Bowl)	W 41–12	16,624	
^{†}Homecoming; Rankings from AP Poll released prior to the game; Source:
