= 1960 Kent State Golden Flashes football team =

American college football season

1960 Kent State Golden Flashes football
- Conference: Mid-American Conference
- Record: 6–3 (4–2 MAC)
- Head coach: Trevor J. Rees (15th season)
- Home stadium: Memorial Stadium

1960 Mid-American Conference football standings
	Conf.					Overall
Team	W		L		T	W		L		T
No. 1 Ohio $	6	–	0	–	0	10	–	0	–	0
No. 6 Bowling Green	5	–	1	–	0	8	–	1	–	0
Kent State	4	–	2	–	0	6	–	3	–	0
Miami (OH)	2	–	3	–	0	5	–	5	–	0
Western Michigan	2	–	4	–	0	4	–	4	–	1
Marshall	1	–	4	–	0	2	–	7	–	1
Toledo	0	–	6	–	0	2	–	7	–	0
$ – Conference champion; Rankings from AP small college poll

The 1960 Kent State Golden Flashes football team was an American football team that represented Kent State University in the Mid-American Conference (MAC) during the 1960 college football season. In their 15th season under head coach Trevor J. Rees, the Golden Flashes compiled a 6–3 record (4–2 against MAC opponents), finished in third place in the MAC, and were outscored by all opponents by a combined total of 129 to 118.

The team's statistical leaders included Marty Grosjean with 482 rushing yards, Jim Flynn with 423 passing yards, and Bob Gusbar with 301 receiving yards. Offensive lineman Bob Gusbar was selected as a first-team All-MAC player.

== Schedule ==
Date	Opponent	Site	Result	Attendance	Source
September 24	at Baldwin–Wallace*	Ray Watts Stadium; Berea, OH	W 16–6		
October 1	Ohio	Memorial Stadium; Kent, OH	L 8–25	9,500	
October 8	at Miami (OH)	Miami Field; Oxford, OH	W 22–19	10,687	
October 15	Marshall	Memorial Stadium; Kent, OH	W 22–6	5,000	
October 22	at Bowling Green	University Stadium; Bowling Green, OH (rivalry)	L 0–28	11,800	
October 29	Toledo	Memorial Stadium; Kent, OH	W 18–13	9,500	
November 5	Western Michigan	Memorial Stadium; Kent, OH	W 10–3	12,000	
November 11	at Louisville*	Fairgrounds Stadium; Louisville, KY	L 8–22	3,633	
November 19	at Dayton*	UD Stadium; Dayton, OH	W 14–7	5,500	
*Non-conference game; Source:
