= 1960 Ohio Bobcats football team =

American college football season

1960 Ohio Bobcats football

AP small college national champion; UPI small college national champion; MAC champion
- Conference: Mid-American Conference
- Record: 10–0 (6–0 MAC)
- Head coach: Bill Hess (3rd season)
- Home stadium: Peden Stadium

1960 Mid-American Conference football standings
	Conf.					Overall
Team	W		L		T	W		L		T
No. 1 Ohio $	6	–	0	–	0	10	–	0	–	0
No. 6 Bowling Green	5	–	1	–	0	8	–	1	–	0
Kent State	4	–	2	–	0	6	–	3	–	0
Miami (OH)	2	–	3	–	0	5	–	5	–	0
Western Michigan	2	–	4	–	0	4	–	4	–	1
Marshall	1	–	4	–	0	2	–	7	–	1
Toledo	0	–	6	–	0	2	–	7	–	0
$ – Conference champion; Rankings from AP small college poll

The 1960 Ohio Bobcats football team was an American football team that represented Ohio University during the 1960 college football season. In their third season under head coach Bill Hess, the Bobcats won the Mid-American Conference (MAC) championship, compiled a perfect 10–0 record (6–0 against MAC opponents), shut out five of ten opponents, and outscored all opponents by a combined total of 269 to 34. They played their home games in Peden Stadium in Athens, Ohio.

The Bobcats also won the NCAA College Division national championship. They were ranked No. 1 in the final UPI small college poll with 348 points, ahead of Lenoir–Rhyne by more than 100 points.

The highlight of the season was a November 12 victory over defending national champion Bowling Green. The victory snapped Bowling Green's 18-game winning streak. The Bobcats also defeated the No. 8 Miami Redskins, snapping an 18-year jinx in the annual Battle of the Bricks rivalry game.

== Schedule ==
Date	Opponent	Rank	Site	Result	Attendance	Source
September 17	at Dayton*		UD Stadium; Dayton, OH	W 28–0	13,502	
September 24	Toledo		Peden Stadium; Athens, OH	W 48–7	9,000–12,000	
October 1	at Kent State		Memorial Stadium; Kent, OH	W 25–8	9,500	
October 8	at Boston University*	No. 1	Nickerson Field; Boston, MA	W 36–6	7,100	
October 15	at Xavier*	No. 1	Xavier Stadium; Cincinnati, OH	W 6–0	9,200–9,234	
October 22	Miami (OH)^{†}	No. 2	Peden Stadium; Athens, OH (rivalry)	W 21–0	15,176	
October 29	at Western Michigan	No. 1	Waldo Stadium; Kalamazoo, MI	W 24–0	8,000	
November 5	Marshall	No. 1	Peden Stadium; Athens, OH (rivalry)	W 19–0	5,000	
November 12	at No. 4 Bowling Green	No. 1	University Stadium; Bowling Green, OH	W 14–7	12,600–12,660	
November 19	Southern Illinois*	No. 1	Peden Stadium; Athens, OH	W 48–6	11,000	
*Non-conference game; ^{†}Homecoming; Rankings from AP Poll released prior to the game
