= Bradford Area High School =

Location
- 81 Interstate Parkway; Bradford, Pennsylvania 16701; United States
- Coordinates: 41.9599°N 78.6603°W

Information
- Type: Public
- School district: Bradford Area
- Principal: David Ray
- Teaching staff: 48.70 (FTE)
- Enrollment: 736 (2023–2024)
- Student to teacher ratio: 15.11
- Colors: Red and Black
- Mascot: Owl
- Website: Bradford Area High School Website

Bradford Area High School is a public high school providing grades 9-12. It is located in Bradford, Pennsylvania, in the north central region of the Commonwealth. The current principal is David Ray. In the 2016–2017 school year the enrollment was 776. The demographics of the students body are: 95% of the students are white, while 1% are black, 1% are Hispanic, 1% are Asian and 2% are American Indian.

== Extracurriculars ==
The district offers a variety of clubs, activities and sports.

=== Athletics ===
Bradford Area participates in PIAA District IX (9)

Sport Name	Boys	Girls
Baseball / Softball	Class AAA	Class AAA
Basketball	Class AAA	Class AAA
Cross country	Class AAA	Class AAA
Football	Class AAA	
Golf	Class AAAA	Class AAAA
Soccer	Class AA	Class AA
Swimming and Diving	Class AAA	Class AAA
Tennis	Class AAA	Class AAA (Team)
Track and Field	Class AA	Class AA
Volleyball		Class AA
Wrestling	Class AAA	

The athletics program has produced two known professional baseball players, Ben Copeland and Zachary Foster. The athletics program excels in their region and has graduated numerous athletes that have signed National Letters of Intent to play NCAA Division II and III sports at prestigious universities.

== Notable alumni ==
- Stew Barber, former NFL player
- Hank Goodman, former NFL player
- Larry Peace, former NFL player
- Art Stevenson, former NFL player
- Jiggs Ullery, former NFL player
- Jim Owens, former MLB player
