= 1960 Army Cadets football team =

American college football season

1960 Army Cadets football
- Conference: Independent
- Record: 6–3–1
- Head coach: Dale Hall (2nd season)
- Captains: Frank Gibson; Al Vanderbush
- Home stadium: Michie Stadium

1960 Eastern major college football independents records
	Conf.			Overall
Team	W	L	T	W		L		T
No. 19 Syracuse		–		7	–	2	–	0
No. 16 Penn State		–		7	–	3	–	0
Army		–		6	–	3	–	1
Holy Cross		–		6	–	4	–	0
Pittsburgh		–		4	–	3	–	3
Boston University		–		3	–	5	–	2
Boston College		–		3	–	6	–	1
Colgate		–		2	–	7	–	0
Villanova		–		2	–	8	–	0
Rankings from AP poll

The 1960 Army Cadets football team represented the United States Military Academy as an independent during the 1960 college football season. In their second year under head coach Dale Hall, the Cadets compiled a 6–3–1 record and outscored all opponents by a combined total of 222 to 95. In the annual Army–Navy Game, the Cadets lost to the Midshipmen by a 17 to 12 score. The Cadets also lost to Penn State and Nebraska.

Army guard Al Vanderbush was selected by the Central Press Association as a first-team player on the 1960 College Football All-America Team. He was also selected by the UPI as a second-team player.

== Schedule ==
Date	Opponent	Rank	Site	Result	Attendance	Source
September 17	Buffalo		Michie Stadium; West Point, NY	W 37–0	15,250	
September 24	Boston College		Michie Stadium; West Point, NY	W 20–7	20,150	
October 1	at California		California Memorial Stadium; Berkeley, CA	W 28–10	51,000	
October 8	Penn State	No. 18	Michie Stadium; West Point, NY	L 16–27	27,150	
October 15	at Nebraska		Memorial Stadium; Lincoln, NE	L 9–14	39,000	
October 22	Villanova		Michie Stadium; West Point, NY	W 54–0	24,154	
October 29	Miami (OH)		Michie Stadium; West Point, NY	W 30–7	19,126	
November 5	vs. Syracuse		Yankee Stadium; Bronx, NY	W 9–6	66,000	
November 12	at Pittsburgh		Pitt Stadium; Pittsburgh, PA	T 7–7	45,498	
November 26	vs. Navy		Philadelphia Municipal Stadium; Philadelphia, PA (Army–Navy Game)	L 12–17	100,000	
Rankings from AP Poll released prior to the game; Source:

== Season summary ==
=== vs Syracuse ===
External videos
- Army Football Throwback Thursday – 1960 vs. Syracuse

== Personnel ==
1960 Army Black Knights football team roster
Players			Coaches
Offense: Pos. / # / Name / Class; G / / Al Vanderbush (C) / Sr	Defense: Pos. / # / Name / Class	Special teams: Pos. / # / Name / Class	Head coach: Dale Hall; Coordinators/assistant coaches Legend: (C) Team captain; (S) Suspended; (I) Ineligible; Injured; Redshirt
