= 1960 Toledo Rockets football team =

American college football season

1960 Toledo Rockets football
- Conference: Mid-American Conference
- Record: 2–7 (0–6 MAC)
- Head coach: Clive Rush (1st season)
- Home stadium: Glass Bowl

1960 Mid-American Conference football standings
	Conf.					Overall
Team	W		L		T	W		L		T
No. 1 Ohio $	6	–	0	–	0	10	–	0	–	0
No. 6 Bowling Green	5	–	1	–	0	8	–	1	–	0
Kent State	4	–	2	–	0	6	–	3	–	0
Miami (OH)	2	–	3	–	0	5	–	5	–	0
Western Michigan	2	–	4	–	0	4	–	4	–	1
Marshall	1	–	4	–	0	2	–	7	–	1
Toledo	0	–	6	–	0	2	–	7	–	0
$ – Conference champion; Rankings from AP small college poll

The 1960 Toledo Rockets football team was an American football team that represented Toledo University in the Mid-American Conference (MAC) during the 1960 college football season. In their first season under head coach Clive Rush, the Rockets compiled a 2–7 record (0–6 against MAC opponents) and finished in seventh place in the MAC.

The team's statistical leaders included Jerry Stoltz with 277 passing yards, John Murray with 608 rushing yards, and Bob Smith with 268 receiving yards.

== Schedule ==
Date	Opponent	Site	Result	Attendance	Source
September 17	Youngstown State*	Glass Bowl; Toledo, OH	W 34–30	6,000	
September 24	at Ohio	Peden Stadium; Athens, OH	L 7–48	9,000–12,000	
October 1	at Marshall	Fairfield Stadium; Huntington, WV	L 0–14	7,000	
October 8	Hillsdale*	Glass Bowl; Toledo, OH	L 25–31	6,500	
October 15	Bowling Green	Glass Bowl; Toledo, OH (rivalry)	L 3–14	9,500	
October 22	at Western Michigan	Waldo Stadium; Kalamazoo, MI	L 3–7	12,000	
October 29	at Kent State	Memorial Stadium; Kent, OH	L 13–18	9,500	
November 5	Miami (OH)	Glass Bowl; Toledo, OH	L 13–30	6,531–6,600	
November 12	Bradley*	Glass Bowl; Toledo, OH	W 28–0	3,400	
*Non-conference game; Source:
