= 1960 Boston College Eagles football team =

American college football season

1960 Boston College Eagles football
- Conference: Independent
- Record: 3–6–1
- Head coach: Ernie Hefferle (1st season)
- Captain: Terry Glynn
- Home stadium: Alumni Stadium

1960 Eastern major college football independents records
| | Conf. | | | Overall |
| Team | W | L | T | W | | L | | T |
|---|---|---|---|---|---|---|---|---|
| No. 19 Syracuse | | – | | 7 | – | 2 | – | 0 |
| No. 16 Penn State | | – | | 7 | – | 3 | – | 0 |
| Army | | – | | 6 | – | 3 | – | 1 |
| Holy Cross | | – | | 6 | – | 4 | – | 0 |
| Pittsburgh | | – | | 4 | – | 3 | – | 3 |
| Boston University | | – | | 3 | – | 5 | – | 2 |
| Boston College | | – | | 3 | – | 6 | – | 1 |
| Colgate | | – | | 2 | – | 7 | – | 0 |
| Villanova | | – | | 2 | – | 8 | – | 0 |
Rankings from AP poll

The 1960 Boston College Eagles football team represented Boston College as an independent during the 1960 college football season. Led by first-year head coach Ernie Hefferle, the Eagles compiled a record of 3–6–1. Boston College played home games at Alumni Stadium in Chestnut Hill, Massachusetts.

== Schedule ==
| Date | Opponent | Site | Result | Attendance | Source |
|---|---|---|---|---|---|
| September 17 | Navy | Alumni Stadium; Chestnut Hill, MA | L 7–22 | 27,000 | |
| September 24 | at Army | Michie Stadium; West Point, NY | L 7–20 | 20,150 | |
| October 8 | at Marquette | Marquette Stadium; Milwaukee, WI | L 12–13 | 14,100 | |
| October 15 | Detroit | Alumni Stadium; Chestnut Hill, MA | L 17–19 | 13,000 | |
| October 22 | VMI | Alumni Stadium; Chestnut Hill, MA | T 14–14 | 14,000 | |
| October 28 | at Miami (FL) | Miami Orange Bowl; Miami, FL | L 7–10 | 30,699 | |
| November 5 | at Villanova | Villanova Stadium; Villanova, PA | W 20–6 | 8,354 | |
| November 12 | Boston University | Alumni Stadium; Chestnut Hill, MA (rivalry) | W 23–14 | 22,500 | |
| November 19 | Clemson | Alumni Stadium; Chestnut Hill, MA (rivalry) | W 25–14 | 15,700 | |
| November 26 | Holy Cross | Alumni Stadium; Chestnut Hill, MA (rivalry) | L 12–16 | 26,000 | |
