= 1960 Villanova Wildcats football team =

American college football season

1960 Villanova Wildcats football
- Conference: Independent
- Record: 2–8
- Head coach: Alexander F. Bell (1st season)
- Captain: Joseph Luzzi
- Home stadium: Villanova Stadium

1960 Eastern major college football independents records
	Conf.			Overall
Team	W	L	T	W		L		T
No. 19 Syracuse		–		7	–	2	–	0
No. 16 Penn State		–		7	–	3	–	0
Army		–		6	–	3	–	1
Holy Cross		–		6	–	4	–	0
Pittsburgh		–		4	–	3	–	3
Boston University		–		3	–	5	–	2
Boston College		–		3	–	6	–	1
Colgate		–		2	–	7	–	0
Villanova		–		2	–	8	–	0
Rankings from AP poll

The 1960 Villanova Wildcats football team represented the Villanova University during the 1960 college football season. The head coach was Alexander F. Bell, coaching his first season with the Wildcats. The team played their home games at Villanova Stadium in Villanova, Pennsylvania.

== Schedule ==
Date	Opponent	Site	Result	Attendance	Source
September 17	at Marquette	Marquette Stadium; Milwaukee, WI	L 13–23	15,400	
September 24	at Navy	Navy–Marine Corps Memorial Stadium; Annapolis, MD	L 7–41	20,271	
October 1	at Dayton	UD Stadium; Dayton, OH	L 0–14	11,000	
October 8	Pacific (CA)	Villanova Stadium; Villanova, PA	L 6–26	9,370	
October 15	Miami (OH)*	Villanova Stadium; Villanova, PA	L 7–17	5,000	
October 22	at Army	Michie Stadium; West Point, NY	L 0–54	24,154	
October 29	at Rutgers	Rutgers Stadium; New Brunswick, NJ	W 14–12	11,000	
November 5	Boston College	Villanova Stadium; Villanova, PA	L 6–20	8,354	
November 12	Detroit	Villanova Stadium; Villanova, PA	L 7–13	5,300	
November 19	Xavier	Villanova Stadium; Villanova, PA	W 21–7	5,600–5,635	
*Non-conference game; Source:
