= Angleball =

American indoor and field sport

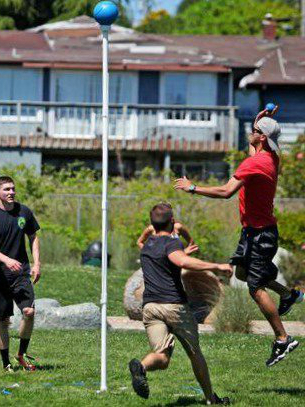
American Angleball Championship 2015

Angleball is a registered sports fitness organization and patented equipment manufacturer for North America's oldest sport, anejodi. Angleball's anejodi rules were reestablished as an American tradition during World War II at Brown University by collegiate Hall of Fame football and basketball coach Charles "Rip" Engle (March 26, 1906 – March 7, 1983) to keep American World War II servicemen fit prior to deployment. Angleball equipment is currently played by 1,000,000+ people in the United States and worldwide and for conditioning in the NFL and by Team USA Olympic athletes. International Angleball has 13 current member countries. The Angleball organization honors its ancient heritage by encouraging groups to produce their own anejodi equipment to Angleball's patented measurements, using available or natural materials, as long as the equipment is not sold. Angleball is a registered trademark and is sold exclusively by the Angleball company.

== Gameplay ==
Two large target-balls are placed on standards at opposite sides of a field, however half-field can also be played The Angleball can be run or passed. A goal is worth one point. Angleball can be played with varying levels of contact: non-contact, touch-contact, and full-contact; this is similar to flag, touch and tackle football. The means of stopping the offense depends on the level of contact that the group has decided on: in non-contact Angleball, the ball-carrier may not take a step with the angleball; in touch Angleball the ball-carrier must pass within 3 seconds after being tagged; in full-contact Angleball the ball must be passed or shot within 3 seconds of a tag and contact is allowed. It is also often played that a pass cannot touch the ground, and that a circle key surrounds each standard that the offense cannot step inside; club variations are welcome within the Angleball community. Complete competition rules can be found on the Angleball company website . Angleball can be played with as few as 1 v 1 with a single standard placed against a rebound wall, all the way up to 100 v 100 with a standard at both ends of a park or camp.

The Angleball Championship has been held annually since 2014.

== History ==
The first high school game played was in the late 1960s at Pioneer Ranch in Tidioute, Pennsylvania, when the Corry High School Beavers football team hosted the Titusville Rockets team. Corry's athletic director and head football coach, Lou Hanna, and Titusville's athletic director, Roy Van Horn, had been teammates on the 1939 Slippery Rock State Teachers College undefeated championship football team. The game was won by Corry.

Van Horn was the owner of Pioneer Ranch, a boys camp on the Allegheny River near Tidioute, Pennsylvania. With Hanna, he founded the Northwestern Pennsylvania Football Camp at Pioneer Ranch in 1961, the nation's first summertime football camp for high school gridders, and hired Penn State's coaches to staff it. It was here a relationship with Rip Engle was formed, and they were first introduced to anejodi.

In the mid-1990s the game was also introduced to students at Taylor University in Upland, Indiana by Philosophy Professor, Dr. James Spiegel. Dr. Spiegel had first learned of the sport from Dr. Wynn Kenyon at Belhaven College in the 1980s. On October 4, 2009 Angleball was introduced to a group of about 20 people in Tucson, Arizona. It remains a favorite in Gym classes at Bellefonte Area High School in Bellefonte, Pennsylvania, Penns Valley Area High School in Spring Mills, Pennsylvania, Philipsburg-Osceola Area School District in Philipsburg, Pennsylvania, as well as Park Forest and Mount Nittany Middle Schools in State College, Pennsylvania. Angleball sets are manufactured by the American association and are being used in the NFL and by Colleges, camps, schools, and all age groups throughout the United States and Canada. In 2011 at the 100th year celebration of the Dept. of Kinesiology at Penn State, an Angleball association set was featured in "The Ball Games of the World Exhibit" presented by Dr. Ken Swalgin, Associate Professor of Kinesiology. The exhibit includes over 80 balls, equipment, and posters depicting ball sports from around the world. Ball sports are categorized as follows: handball games, bowls and bowling, ball and bat games, racket and paddle games, football games, ball and raised goal games, invasion goal games, and other ball games.(Swalgin, K.L. 2011).

In 2012, an Angleball set was adopted by the NFL's Philadelphia Eagles for preseason conditioning.

In September 2013, American Angleball sponsored the first angleball match in Africa (Masaka, Uganda) with the help of Sporting Is The Answer.
