= 1960 All-Eastern football team =

Selected players from the American football 1960 NCAA University Division

The 1960 All-Eastern football team consists of American football players chosen by various selectors as the best players at each position among the Eastern colleges and universities during the 1960 college football season.

The 1960 All-Eastern team included two Heisman Trophy winners. Joe Bellino of Army won the award in 1960, and Ernie Davis of Syracuse won it in 1961.

== Backs ==
- Paul Terhes, Bucknell (AP-1; UPI-1)
- Joe Bellino, Navy (AP-1; UPI-1)
- Ernie Davis, Syracuse (AP-1; UPI-1)
- Al Rozycki, Dartmouth (AP-1)
- Jim Cunningham, Pittsburgh (UPI-1)
- Tom Singleton, Yale (AP-2)
- Fred Cox, Pittsburgh (AP-2)
- Dick Desmarais, Boston University (AP-2)
- Bob Blanchard, Yale (AP-2)

== Ends ==
- Mike Ditka, Pittsburgh (AP-1; UPI-1)
- Fred Mautino, Syracuse (AP-1; UPI-1)
- Robert Mitinger, Penn State (AP-2)
- Joe Sikorski, Boston College (AP-2)

== Tackles ==
- Stew Barber, Penn State (AP-1; UPI-1)
- Mike Pyle, Yale (AP-1; UPI-1)
- Dale Kuhns, Army (AP-2)
- Dave Meggyesy, Syracuse (AP-2)

== Guards ==
- Al Vanderbush, Army (AP-1; UPI-1)
- Ben Balme, Yale (AP-1; UPI-1)
- John Hewitt, Navy (AP-2)
- Larry Vignali, Pittsburgh (AP-2)

== Center ==
- Frank Visted, Navy (AP-2; UPI-1)
- Alex Kroll, Rutgers (AP-1)

== Key ==
- AP = Associated Press
- UPI = United Press International

== See also ==
- 1960 College Football All-America Team
