= Dave Lloyd (American football) =

American football player (1936–2014)

- Lloyd in 1963

No. 52
- Position: Linebacker

Personal information
- Born: November 9, 1936; Sapulpa, Oklahoma, U.S.
- Died: August 9, 2014 (aged 77); Gladewater, Texas, U.S.
- Listed height: 6 ft 3 in (1.91 m)
- Listed weight: 247 lb (112 kg)

Career information
- High school: Staunton Military Academy (Staunton, Virginia); Darlington School (Rome, Georgia)
- College: Texas Tech; Georgia
- NFL draft: 1959: 4th round, 47th overall pick

Career history
- Cleveland Browns (1959–1961); Detroit Lions (1962); Philadelphia Eagles (1963–1970)

Awards and highlights
- Pro Bowl (1969)

Career NFL statistics
- Interceptions: 14
- Fumble recoveries: 13
- Sacks: 23
- Stats at Pro Football Reference

David Allen Lloyd (November 9, 1936 – August 9, 2014) was an American professional football player. He played linebacker for the Cleveland Browns, Detroit Lions, and Philadelphia Eagles in the National Football League (NFL) for 12 seasons. Hall of Fame sportswriter Ray Didinger called Lloyd one of the most underrated players in Eagle history. He played college football at the University of Georgia, after playing his freshman year at Texas Tech.

== Early life ==
Lloyd was born on November 9, 1936, in Sapulpa, Oklahoma. He later moved to Gladewater, Texas. He attended high school at Gladewater High School and Darlington School before graduating from Staunton Military Academy in Staunton, Virginia. He played fullback on Darlington's football team, and was named the most valuable player in the Mid-South Prep conference. He was a fullback and placekicker on Staunton's football team. In an early November 1954 game against Massanutten Military Academy, Lloyd rushed for 200 yards on 15 carries, with three touchdowns (including a 79-yard touchdown run); while also kicking six extra points.

== College career ==
In 1955, Lloyd played varsity football collegiately at center during his freshman year for Texas Tech, before transferring to Georgia in June 1956. He did not play football for Georgia in 1956 because he was a transfer student. He played at linebacker and center with Georgia in the Southeastern Conference (SEC), and was the team's starting center in 1957 and 1958. He was an International News Service (INS) honorable mention All-SEC lineman in 1957.

Georgia head coach Wally Butts also considered Lloyd possibly to be the best linebacker he had coached at Georgia over twenty years. Butts planned to move Lloyd to fullback during Lloyd's senior year (1959), but Lloyd instead went on to play in the NFL. In May 1959, Lloyd received Georgia's silver goblet award among the school's football players.

== Professional career ==
=== Cleveland Browns ===
The Cleveland Browns selected Lloyd in the fourth round of the 1959 NFL draft, 47th overall. Lloyd could have stayed at Georgia for his senior season; but chose to sign with the Browns because he had a wife and three children to support.

During his first two seasons with the Browns, the team was strong at the linebacker position and Lloyd started only one game; but still had 3.5 quarterback sacks in 1960. He played on special teams and was known as a "head hunter" because of his vicious tackling. Lloyd became the Browns' starting middle linebacker in 1961, with two fumble recoveries and five quarterback sacks. Although Lloyd was 248 lb (112.5 kg), Browns' head coach Paul Brown was focused on Lloyd's speed in choosing to start Lloyd; believing that speed combined with Lloyd's size would improve the Browns' rushing defense. During training camp, Lloyd had run the 40–yard dash in 4.9 seconds while dressed in full gear. Lloyd proved he was effective as a run defender once the season began.

=== Detroit Lions ===
In March 1962, the Browns traded Lloyd, quarterback Milt Plum, and running back Tom Watkins to the Detroit Lions for quarterback Jim Ninowski, halfback Howard "Hopalong" Cassady, and defensive end Bill Glass (the Lions' starter at right defensive end in 1961). Lloyd could not displace Joe Schmidt at middle linebacker or Bob Whitlow at center during the Lions' 1962 training camp; and the Lions tried him at defensive end to replace Glass. The team ultimately used Sam Williams to replace Glass at right defensive end during the 1962 season, and Lloyd played the 1962 season as a reserve linebacker and defensive end for the Lions. In August 1963, the Lions traded Lloyd and guard Dick Mills to the Philadelphia Eagles for a future (fourth round) draft choice.

=== Philadelphia Eagles ===
Lloyd became the Eagles' starting middle linebacker in 1963, and held that starting position until the fifth game of the 1970 season. He was the biggest middle linebacker in the NFL in 1963, and was as heavy or heavier than all of the Eagles' defensive linemen. In 1963, he started 13 games at middle linebacker for the Eagles, with three interceptions, two fumble recoveries, and one quarterback sack. He had two interceptions during a December 1, 1963 game against the Pittsburgh Steelers.

In early 1964, Joe Kuharich took over as the Eagles' new head coach. In studying films of the 1963 Eagles' season, Kuharich observed that Lloyd had progressed as a linebacker and was a complete linebacker by the last three to four games of the 1963 season; stating "'When you can set up behind those interior tackles and shut off the inside, watch the outsides and still have the faculty to drop back for that interception, you're a complete middle linebacker'".

In 1964, Lloyd started 11 games at middle linebacker for the Eagles, with three interceptions, one fumble recovery, and two quarterback sacks. On October 11, he intercepted a pass against future Hall of Fame quarterback Sonny Jurgensen, and returned it 27 yards. In mid-October 1964, Lloyd suffered a tear in the medial collateral ligament of his right knee, and missed three games that season.

Lloyd started 13 games as the Eagles' middle linebacker in 1965. After the first week of the 1965 NFL season, the Associated Press selected Lloyd as defensive player of the week for his performance against the St. Louis Cardinals. On the season, he had two interceptions, three fumble recoveries, and six sacks.

Eagles' placekicker Sam Baker was unable to play in the third game of the 1965 season, and Kuharich made Lloyd the team's placekicker. Lloyd had not kicked since college, where he had attempted less than ten field goals. On October 3, 1965 against the Cleveland Browns, Lloyd kicked a 42-yard field goal in his first field goal attempt as a professional football player. He also kicked and made two extra points in the game. The following week against the Dallas Cowboys Lloyd had an interception; and made all five of his extra point attempts. Cowboys' tackle Jethro Pugh blocked the second field goal attempt of Lloyd's professional career. These were the only two games of his 12-year NFL career in which Lloyd was a placekicker attempting field goals and extra points.

In 1966, Lloyd started all 14 games for the first time in his NFL career. He had three interceptions, two fumble recoveries, and 3.5 sacks. He started all 14 games at middle linebacker again for the Eagles in 1967, with one interception and two sacks. He started 13 games with two fumble recoveries in 1968. The following season (1969), Lloyd was selected to play in the Pro Bowl for the only time in his 12-year career. He again started all 14 games as the Eagles' middle linebacker, with two interceptions.

Lloyd was a starter to begin the 1970 season. He only started five games, as Pro Bowl defensive end Tim Rossovich was moved to middle linebacker in the sixth game of the 1970 season. The Eagles began the season losing five straight games; and were 3–5–1 after moving Rossovich to middle linebacker and changing their defensive linebacking scheme. The Eagles had anticipated that Rossovich would eventually replace Lloyd at middle linebacker, and Lloyd had tutored Rossovich on how to play the position in the preseason; though Lloyd was surprised he was replaced before the end of the 1970 season. After being placed in a reserve linebacker role, Lloyd handled kickoff duties for the Eagles, and was used on goal line defenses.

In early December 1970, Lloyd anticipated that he would retire after that season ended, not wanting to become a bench player or solely a kicker. He retired in May 1971. Lloyd was known as "Pappy" among his veteran teammates. He roomed with Floyd Peters while he was with the Eagles. Hall of Fame sportswriter Ray Didinger has called Lloyd one of the most underrated players in Eagles' history.

== Personal life and death ==
Lloyd and his wife Ginny had three children. During his later career in Philadelphia, Lloyd worked for a company that manufactured pollution control equipment and planned to continue that work full time after retiring. Lloyd owned a construction company in Texas after retiring from football. He died at the age of 77 at his home in Gladewater, Texas on August 9, 2014.
