= Ernie Hefferle =

American football player and coach (1915–2000)

- Hefferle pictured in Sub Turri 1961, Boston College yearbook

Biographical details
- Born: January 12, 1915; Herminie, Pennsylvania, U.S.
- Died: August 8, 2000 (aged 85); Metairie, Louisiana, U.S.

Playing career
- 1934–1936: Duquesne
- Position: End

Coaching career (HC unless noted)
- 1937–1940: South Huntington HS (PA)
- 1941–1942: Tarentum HS (PA)
- 1947–1950: Tarentum HS (PA)
- 1951–1958: Pittsburgh (freshmen)
- 1952–1958: Pittsburgh (OL)
- 1959: Washington Redskins (OL)
- 1960–1961: Boston College
- 1962–1964: Pittsburgh (assistant)
- 1965: Pittsburgh Steelers (OL)
- 1966–1969: Miami Dolphins (OL)
- 1970–1971: Pittsburgh (assistant)
- 1975: New Orleans Saints (interim HC)

Administrative career (AD unless noted)
- 1972–1975: New Orleans Saints (personnel director)

Head coaching record
- Overall: 7–12–1 (college); 1–7 (NFL)

Ernest Edward Hefferle (January 12, 1915 – August 8, 2000) was an American football player and coach. He served as head football coach at Boston College from 1960 to 1961 and as the interim head coach for the New Orleans Saints of the National Football League (NFL) in 1975. A football star at Duquesne University, Hefferle pulled in a fourth quarter bomb from Boyd Brombaugh to win the 1937 Orange Bowl for the Dukes. He served as a high school coach in South Huntingdon, Pennsylvania and Tarentum, Pennsylvania from 1947 to 1950. From 1951 to 1958, he was assistant coach at the University of Pittsburgh. In 1959, he was an assistant under Mike Nixon with the Washington Redskins. He was head coach of the Boston College Eagles from 1960 to 1961, where he had a 7–12–1 record. On December 21, 1961 he resigned his position as head coach. From 1962 to 1964 and from 1970 to 1971, he was again and assistant at the University of Pittsburgh. In 1965, he served under former boss Mike Nixon on the Pittsburgh Steelers coaching staff. In 1975 Hefferle, then the Saints' director of pro personnel was hired as interim head after the firing of John North. He had a record 1–7 in his one half season as the Saints interim head coach.

Hefferle died on August 8, 2000, at Metropolitan Hospice in Metairie, Louisiana.

== Head coaching record ==
=== College ===
| Year | Team | Overall | Conference | Standing | Bowl/playoffs |
|---|---|---|---|---|---|
Boston College Eagles (Independent) (1960–1961)
| 1960 | Boston College | 3–6–1 | | | |
| 1961 | Boston College | 4–6 | | | |
| Boston College: | | 7–12–1 | | | |
| Total: | | 7–12–1 | | | |
