= 1960 Buffalo Bulls football team =

American college football season

1960 Buffalo Bulls football
- Conference: Independent
- Record: 4–6
- Head coach: Dick Offenhamer (6th season)
- Captain: Gordon Bukaty
- Home stadium: War Memorial Stadium, Rotary Field

1960 Eastern non-major college football independents records
	Conf.			Overall
Team	W	L	T	W		L		T
Montclair State		–		8	–	0	–	0
Southern Connecticut State		–		7	–	3	–	0
Buffalo		–		4	–	6	–	0
Carnegie Tech		–		3	–	5	–	0
Northeastern		–		2	–	5	–	1
Union (NY)		–		2	–	5	–	1

The 1960 Buffalo Bulls football team was an American football team that represented the University of Buffalo as an independent during the 1960 college football season. In its sixth season under head coach Dick Offenhamer, the team compiled a 4–6 record. The team played its home games at War Memorial Stadium and Rotary Field in Buffalo, New York.

== Schedule ==
Date	Opponent	Site	Result	Attendance	Source
September 17	at Army	Michie Stadium; West Point, NY	L 0–37	15,000–15,250	
September 24	VMI	War Memorial Stadium; Buffalo, NY	L 14–28	18,675	
October 1	at Temple	Temple Stadium; Philadelphia, PA	W 21–12	9,500	
October 8	at Bucknell	Memorial Stadium; Lewisburg, PA	L 0–41	8,000–8,500	
October 15	Youngstown	Rotary Field; Buffalo, NY	W 40–13	7,900–7,909	
October 22	at Western Reserve	Clarke Field; Cleveland, OH	W 44–0	4,500	
October 29	Colgate	War Memorial Stadium; Buffalo, NY	L 20–28	15,132–15,000	
November 5	Connecticut	Rotary Field; Buffalo, NY	L 24–31	6,875–6,900	
November 12	at Gettysburg	Gettysburg, PA	W 36–6	4,500	
November 19	Boston University	War Memorial Stadium; Buffalo, NY	L 14–42	8,137	
