= 1960 Marshall Thundering Herd football team =

American college football season

1960 Marshall Thundering Herd football
- Conference: Mid-American Conference
- Record: 2–7–1 (1–4 MAC)
- Head coach: Charlie Snyder (2nd season)
- Captains: Alpha Mayfield; Wilson Lathan
- Home stadium: Fairfield Stadium

1960 Mid-American Conference football standings
	Conf.					Overall
Team	W		L		T	W		L		T
No. 1 Ohio $	6	–	0	–	0	10	–	0	–	0
No. 6 Bowling Green	5	–	1	–	0	8	–	1	–	0
Kent State	4	–	2	–	0	6	–	3	–	0
Miami (OH)	2	–	3	–	0	5	–	5	–	0
Western Michigan	2	–	4	–	0	4	–	4	–	1
Marshall	1	–	4	–	0	2	–	7	–	1
Toledo	0	–	6	–	0	2	–	7	–	0
$ – Conference champion; Rankings from AP small college poll

The 1960 Marshall Thundering Herd football team was an American football team that represented Marshall University in the Mid-American Conference (MAC) during the 1960 college football season. In its second season under head coach Charlie Snyder, the team compiled a 2–7–1 record (1–4 against conference opponents), finished in sixth place out of seven teams in the MAC, and was outscored by a total of 160 to 58. Alpha Mayfield and Wilson Lathan were the team captains. The team played its home games at Fairfield Stadium in Huntington, West Virginia.

== Schedule ==
Date	Opponent	Site	Result	Attendance	Source
September 17	Wittenberg*	Fairfield Stadium; Huntington, WV	L 0–3	2,500	
September 24	at Bowling Green	University Stadium; Bowling Green, OH	L 7–14	6,500–7,000	
October 1	Toledo	Fairfield Stadium; Huntington, WV	W 14–0	7,000	
October 8	at Kentucky*	Stoll Field/McLean Stadium; Lexington, KY	L 0–55	15,000	
October 15	at Kent State	Memorial Stadium; Kent, OH	L 6–22	5,000	
October 22	Delaware*^{†}	Fairfield Stadium; Huntington, WV	T 6–6	7,000	
October 29	Louisville*	Fairfield Stadium; Huntington, WV	L 0–7	5,000	
November 5	at No. 1 Ohio	Peden Stadium; Athens, OH (rivalry)	L 0–19	5,000	
November 12	at Western Michigan	Waldo Stadium; Kalamazoo, MI	L 12–34	7,500	
November 19	vs. Eastern Kentucky*	Putnam Stadium; Ashland, KY	W 13–0		
*Non-conference game; ^{†}Homecoming; Rankings from AP Poll released prior to the game; Source:
