= 1960 Colgate Red Raiders football team =

American college football season

1960 Colgate Red Raiders football
- Conference: Independent
- Record: 2–7
- Head coach: Alva Kelley (2nd season)
- Captain: John Maloney
- Home stadium: Colgate Athletic Field

1960 Eastern major college football independents records
	Conf.			Overall
Team	W	L	T	W		L		T
No. 19 Syracuse		–		7	–	2	–	0
No. 16 Penn State		–		7	–	3	–	0
Army		–		6	–	3	–	1
Holy Cross		–		6	–	4	–	0
Pittsburgh		–		4	–	3	–	3
Boston University		–		3	–	5	–	2
Boston College		–		3	–	6	–	1
Colgate		–		2	–	7	–	0
Villanova		–		2	–	8	–	0
Rankings from AP poll

The 1960 Colgate Red Raiders football team was an American football team that represented Colgate University as an independent during the 1960 college football season. Head coach Alva Kelley returned for his second year, leading the team to an identical 2–7 record. John Maloney was the team captain.

The team played its home games at Colgate Athletic Field in Hamilton, New York.

== Schedule ==
Date	Opponent	Site	Result	Attendance	Source
September 24	at Cornell	Schoellkopf Field; Ithaca, NY (rivalry)	W 28–8	12,000	
October 1	Lehigh^{†}	Colgate Athletic Field; Hamilton, NY	L 22–39	6,000	
October 8	at Rutgers	Rutgers Stadium; Piscataway, NJ	L 12–49	15,000	
October 15	at Princeton	Palmer Stadium; Princeton, NJ	L 26–36	22,000	
October 22	at Yale	Yale Bowl; New Haven, CT	L 14–36	31,193	
October 29	at Buffalo	War Memorial Stadium; Buffalo, NY	W 28–20	15,132–15,500	
November 5	Bucknell	Colgate Athletic Field; Hamilton, NY	L 8–12	4,000	
November 12	at No. 17 Syracuse	Archbold Stadium; Syracuse, NY (rivalry)	L 6–46	23,000	
November 19	at Brown	Brown Stadium; Providence, RI	L 14–21	10,000	
^{†}Homecoming; Rankings from AP Poll released prior to the game

== Leading players ==
Statistical leaders for the 1960 Red Raiders included:

- Rushing: John Maloney, 330 yards and 5 touchdowns on 65 attempts
- Passing: Robert Paske, 319 yards, 19 completions and 2 touchdowns on 51 attempts
- Receiving: John Smith, 235 yards and 2 touchdowns on 17 receptions
- Total offense: Daniel Keating, 495 yards (264 passing, 231 rushing)
- Scoring: John Maloney, 30 points from 5 touchdowns
- All-purpose yards: Jacque MacKinnon, 814 yards (324 rushing, 206 receiving, 167 kickoff returning, 99 interception returning, 18 punt returning)
