= Alex Kroll =

American football player (1937–2024)

No. 55
- Positions: Center, tackle

Personal information
- Born: November 23, 1937; Leechburg, Pennsylvania, U.S.
- Died: December 17, 2024 (aged 87); Charlotte, Vermont, U.S.
- Listed height: 6 ft 3 in (1.91 m)
- Listed weight: 230 lb (104 kg)

Career information
- College: Yale (1955-1956); Rutgers (1960-1961)
- NFL draft: 1959: 27th round, 320th overall pick
- AFL draft: 1962: 2nd round, 13th overall pick

Career history
- New York Titans (1962); Hartford Charter Oaks (1964)

Awards and highlights
- Consensus All-American (1961); 2× First-team All-Eastern (1960, 1961)

Career AFL statistics
- Games played: 14
- Games started: 12
- Stats at Pro Football Reference
- College Football Hall of Fame

Alexander Stanley Kroll (November 23, 1937 – December 17, 2024) was an American professional football player and an advertising agency executive at Young & Rubicam, where he was CEO for ten years.

== Early life and football ==
Kroll's father worked in one of Leechburg, Pennsylvania's many steel mills. Growing up, Kroll had a large extended family that served as a support network. He was captain of the football team and ranked second in his class academically, Alex chose to attend Yale University on an academic scholarship. He played on Yale's varsity football team, but a physical argument with a young associate professor got Kroll expelled during his sophomore year.

He enlisted in the U.S. Army, serving two years in the military police and finished his undergraduate degree at Rutgers University. While there, he captained the football team and played center on the school's first undefeated football team, making all seven All-American teams in 1961, while leading the team to a 17-1 record in his two seasons and becoming a Henry Rutgers Scholar along the way.

Kroll was a 1962 player for the American Football League's New York Titans (later the Jets), playing center and offensive tackle. In the off-season he worked as an advertising trainee with Young & Rubicam (Y&R).

== Advertising career ==
Alex Kroll spent his entire business career in advertising at Young & Rubicam, where he rose from copywriter in 1963 to CEO in 1985, retiring as chairman and CEO at the end of 1994. Kroll rose rapidly through the ranks in just his first seven years, becoming executive vice-president and creative director at the agency in 1970 at the age of 33.

During his 10 years as CEO, Y&R's worldwide billings increased 2 1/2 times, to $8 billion, and its offices more than doubled, to 331. Under his leadership, Y&R opened the first advertising agencies in Russia and China and built the largest agency network in Central and Eastern Europe. Bravo grew into America's largest Hispanic agency. And, Y&R acquired Landor, the world's leading identity and design company.

== Activities ==
Kroll was Chairman both for the American Association of Advertising Agencies and the Advertising Council, the organization which produces most of the important public service advertising in the United States. Under his leadership in 1997, the Council launched an initiative to direct donated media to highlight public causes.

Kroll stepped down from Young and Rubicam in 1994, but still kept busy after his retirement, as a senior adviser to the Bill Bradley Presidential Exploratory Committee in 1998, which was formed by former U.S. Senate Democrat Bill Bradley of New Jersey. The committee's intent was to explore a presidential candidacy with the Federal Election Commission.

He developed a program called "Play It Smart", which encourages football coaches to set academic goals for their students. Kroll was featured in the 2009 Showtime program Full Color Football.

== Personal life and death ==
On December 23, 1961, Alex Kroll married Phyllis Benford, whose father was a vice president at Allegheny Ludlum Steel Corporation, in a well-publicized ceremony in Miami Beach, Florida. The couple had two sons and one daughter, whom they raised in West Redding, Connecticut, before moving to Charlotte, Vermont, years later.

Kroll lived next door to his daughter and two of his grandchildren until his death on December 17, 2024, at the age of 87.

=== Awards ===
Kroll was a recipient of the Horatio Alger Award, the NCAA Silver Medal for Excellence, the Walter Camp Distinguished American Award, and the American Jewish Committee's National Human Relations Award. He was a member of the College Football Hall of Fame and the Advertising Hall of Fame.

== See also ==
- Other American Football League players
