= 1960 Bowling Green Falcons football team =

American college football season

1960 Bowling Green Falcons football
- Conference: Mid-American Conference
- Record: 8–1 (5–1 MAC)
- Head coach: Doyt Perry (6th season)
- Home stadium: University Stadium

1960 Mid-American Conference football standings
	Conf.					Overall
Team	W		L		T	W		L		T
No. 1 Ohio $	6	–	0	–	0	10	–	0	–	0
No. 6 Bowling Green	5	–	1	–	0	8	–	1	–	0
Kent State	4	–	2	–	0	6	–	3	–	0
Miami (OH)	2	–	3	–	0	5	–	5	–	0
Western Michigan	2	–	4	–	0	4	–	4	–	1
Marshall	1	–	4	–	0	2	–	7	–	1
Toledo	0	–	6	–	0	2	–	7	–	0
$ – Conference champion; Rankings from AP small college poll

The 1960 Bowling Green Falcons football team was an American football team that represented Bowling Green State University in the Mid-American Conference (MAC) during the 1960 college football season. In their sixth season under head coach Doyt Perry, the Falcons compiled an 8–1 record (5–1 against MAC opponents), lost its only game to MAC champion Ohio (14-7), and outscored all opponents by a combined total of 196 to 61.

On October 29, 1960, the Falcons defeated Cal Poly, 50–6. After the game, the Cal Poly team was in a deadly C-46 plane crash while taking off from the Toledo airport.

== Schedule ==
Date	Opponent	Rank	Site	Result	Attendance	Source
September 24	Marshall		University Stadium; Bowling Green, OH	W 14–7	6,500–7,000	
October 1	at Miami (OH)		Miami Field; Oxford, OH	W 21–12	8,474–10,000	
October 8	at Western Michigan		Waldo Stadium; Kalamazoo, MI	W 14–13	8,500	
October 15	at Toledo		Glass Bowl; Toledo, OH (rivalry)	W 14–3	9,500	
October 22	Kent State		University Stadium; Bowling Green, OH (rivalry)	W 28–0	11,800	
October 29	Cal Poly*	No. 4	University Stadium; Bowling Green, OH	W 50–6	4,900–7,500	
November 5	No. 6. Southern Illinois*	No. 5	University Stadium; Bowling Green, OH	W 27–6	6,200	
November 12	No. 1 Ohio	No. 4	University Stadium; Bowling Green, OH	L 7–14	12,600–12,660	
November 19	at Texas Western*	No. 8	Kidd Field; El Paso, TX	W 21–0	8,000	
*Non-conference game; Rankings from AP Poll released prior to the game; Source:
