= 1960 Montclair State Indians football team =

American college football season

1960 Montclair State Indians football
- Conference: Independent
- Record: 8–0
- Head coach: Jerry Edwards (1st season)
- Captain: Dick DeMasi
- Home stadium: Sprague Field

1960 Eastern non-major college football independents records
	Conf.			Overall
Team	W	L	T	W		L		T
Montclair State		–		8	–	0	–	0
Southern Connecticut State		–		7	–	3	–	0
Buffalo		–		4	–	6	–	0
Carnegie Tech		–		3	–	5	–	0
Northeastern		–		2	–	5	–	1
Union (NY)		–		2	–	5	–	1

The 1960 Montclair State Indians football team was an American football team that represented Monclair State College (now known as Montclair State University) as an independent during the 1960 college football season. In their first year under head coach Jerry Edwards, the Indians compiled a perfect 8–0 record and outscored opponents by a total of 181 to 54. It was the second undefeated season in Montclair State history and the first since 1947. Despite their undefeated record, Montclair State was not chosen to participate in the NAIA's four-team playoffs.

Junior guard Dick DeMasi was the team captain and received third-team honors from the United Press on the 1960 All-America team. DeMasi also punted for the team, tallying 1,082 yards on 29 punts (36.6 yards per punt).

The team's statistical leaders included Bill Gosalczyk with 125 carries for 611 rushing yards; George Jeck with 46 pass completions on 93 attempts for 529 yards and five touchdowns; Robert Crosley with 18 receptions for 237 yards and a touchdown.

The team played its home games at Sprague Field in Montclair, New Jersey.

== Schedule ==
Date	Opponent	Site	Result	Attendance	Source
September 24	at Delaware Valley	Doylestown, PA	W 14–0	1,000	
September 30	Cheyney State	Sprague Field; Montclair, NJ	W 19–7	2,000	
October 8	at Central Connecticut	New Britain, CT	W 34–8	1,500	
October 15	Trenton State	Sprague Field; Montclair, NJ	W 9–6	3,500	
October 22	Gallaudet	Sprague Field; Montclair, NJ	W 38–7	2,000	
October 29	at Kutztown State	Kutztown, PA	W 32–0	1,000	
November 5	Millersville State	Sprague Field; Montclair, NJ	W 14–7	1,775	
November 12	at C. W. Post	Brookville, NY	W 21–19	2,000	
