= Anejodi =

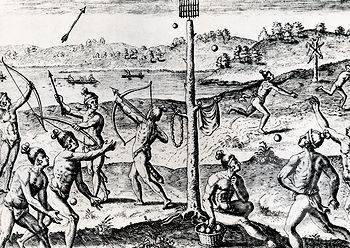
Anejodi, illustrated by the explorer Jacques le Moyne in 1591

According to the Cherokee Nation, Anejodi is a sport played between two even teams who compete over control of a ball which is used to strike a target on top of a pole. Anejodi is the oldest known team sport in North America, having been first documented by French artist and explorer, Jacques LeMoyne in 1591, after he observed the sport being played by the Timucua People of present-day Florida in the United States. LeMoyne illustrated the sport being played with a description that reads as follows, "The young men, they played a certain ball game in the following manner. A post was erected in the middle of an area, and the one who managed to hit the target on top with a ball was awarded a prize" (Library of Congress). Anejodi was also memorialized in a 20-foot-tall bronze statue in Oklahoma in the United States.

Anejodi was reestablished as an American tradition in 1942 by Charles "Rip" Engle, a D1 Hall of Fame football and basketball coach, based on historical art and descriptions of the sport. Engle used the sport to condition American World War 2 service men and women at Brown University. Engle's legacy is carried on by ANGLEBALL USA & Worldwide which manufactures Anejodi equipment to Engle's specifications, in the United States.
