= 1960 Holy Cross Crusaders football team =

American college football season

1960 Holy Cross Crusaders football
- Conference: Independent
- Record: 6–4
- Head coach: Eddie Anderson (17th season)
- Captains: James Rhodes; Richard Skinner
- Home stadium: Fitton Field

1960 Eastern major college football independents records
	Conf.			Overall
Team	W	L	T	W		L		T
No. 19 Syracuse		–		7	–	2	–	0
No. 16 Penn State		–		7	–	3	–	0
Army		–		6	–	3	–	1
Holy Cross		–		6	–	4	–	0
Pittsburgh		–		4	–	3	–	3
Boston University		–		3	–	5	–	2
Boston College		–		3	–	6	–	1
Colgate		–		2	–	7	–	0
Villanova		–		2	–	8	–	0
Rankings from AP poll

The 1960 Holy Cross Crusaders football team was an American football team that represented the College of the Holy Cross as an independent during the 1960 college football season. Eddie Anderson returned for the 11th consecutive year as head coach, his 17th year overall. For the second year in a row, the team compiled a record of 6–4. All home games were played at Fitton Field on the Holy Cross campus in Worcester, Massachusetts.

== Schedule ==
Date	Opponent	Site	Result	Attendance	Source
September 24	at Harvard	Harvard Stadium; Boston, MA	L 6–13	18,000	
October 1	at Boston University	Boston University Field; Boston, MA	L 14–20	14,223	
October 8	No. 1 Syracuse	Fitton Field; Worcester, MA	L 6–15	18,000	
October 15	at Dartmouth	Memorial Field; Hanover, NH	W 9–8	12,500	
October 24	at Columbia	Baker Field; New York, NY	W 27–6	10,414	
October 29	Marquette	Fitton Field; Worcester, MA	W 20–0	8,000	
November 5	Dayton	Fitton Field; Worcester, MA	W 36–6	5,000	
November 12	Penn State^^{†}	Fitton Field; Worcester, MA	L 8–33	20,000	
November 19	Connecticut	Fitton Field; Worcester, MA	W 30–6	10,000	
November 26	at Boston College	Alumni Stadium; Chestnut Hill, MA (rivalry)	W 16–12	27,000	
^{†}Homecoming; ^ Family Weekend; Rankings from AP Poll released prior to the game

== Statistical leaders ==
Statistical leaders for the 1960 Crusaders included:

- Rushing: Tom Hennessey, 365 yards and 3 touchdowns on 73 attempts
- Passing: Pat McCarthy, 941 yards, 59 completions and 4 touchdowns on 142 attempts
- Receiving: Richard Skinner, 158 yards on 16 receptions
- Scoring: Pat McCarthy, 42 points on 5 touchdowns and 2 two-point conversions
- Total offense: Pat McCarthy, 1,220 yards (941 passing, 279 rushing)
- All-purpose yards: Tom Hennessey, 1,066 yards (418 returning, 365 rushing, 283 receiving)
