= 1960 Western Michigan Broncos football team =

American college football season

1960 Western Michigan Broncos football
- Conference: Mid-American Conference
- Record: 4–4–1 (2–4 MAC)
- Head coach: Merle Schlosser (4th season)
- MVP: Jim Habel
- Captain: Leroy Repischak
- Home stadium: Waldo Stadium

1960 Mid-American Conference football standings
	Conf.					Overall
Team	W		L		T	W		L		T
No. 1 Ohio $	6	–	0	–	0	10	–	0	–	0
No. 6 Bowling Green	5	–	1	–	0	8	–	1	–	0
Kent State	4	–	2	–	0	6	–	3	–	0
Miami (OH)	2	–	3	–	0	5	–	5	–	0
Western Michigan	2	–	4	–	0	4	–	4	–	1
Marshall	1	–	4	–	0	2	–	7	–	1
Toledo	0	–	6	–	0	2	–	7	–	0
$ – Conference champion; Rankings from AP small college poll

The 1960 Western Michigan Broncos football team represented Western Michigan University in the Mid-American Conference (MAC) during the 1960 college football season. In their fourth season under head coach Merle Schlosser, the Broncos compiled a 4–4–1 record (2–4 against MAC opponents), finished in fifth place in the MAC, and were outscored by their opponents, 173 to 106. The team played its home games at Waldo Stadium in Kalamazoo, Michigan.

Center Leroy Repischak was the team captain. Offensive tackle Jim Habel received the team's most outstanding player award.

== Schedule ==
Date	Opponent	Site	Result	Attendance	Source
September 17	Central Michigan*	Waldo Stadium; Kalamazoo, MI (rivalry)	W 31–0	11,000	
September 24	at Miami (OH)	Miami Field; Oxford, OH	L 14–15	7,255	
October 1	Baldwin–Wallace*	Waldo Stadium; Kalamazoo, MI	T 28–28	12,000	
October 8	Bowling Green	Waldo Stadium; Kalamazoo, MI	L 13–14	8,500	
October 15	at Washington University*	Francis Field; St. Louis, MO	W 43–0	6,000	
October 22	Toledo	Waldo Stadium; Kalamazoo, MI	W 7–3	12,000	
October 29	No. 1 Ohio	Waldo Stadium; Kalamazoo, MI	L 0–24	8,000	
November 5	at Kent State	Memorial Stadium; Kent, OH	L 3–10	5,500	
November 12	Marshall	Waldo Stadium; Kalamazoo, MI	W 34–12	7,500	
*Non-conference game; Rankings from AP Poll released prior to the game; Source:
