= 1960 Miami Redskins football team =

American college football season

1960 Miami Redskins football
- Conference: Mid-American Conference
- Record: 5–5 (2–3 MAC)
- Head coach: John Pont (5th season)
- MVP: John Moore
- Captains: Dave Kaiser; C. Edward Keating; Napoleon Reid; Roger Turvy
- Home stadium: Miami Field

1960 Mid-American Conference football standings
	Conf.					Overall
Team	W		L		T	W		L		T
No. 1 Ohio $	6	–	0	–	0	10	–	0	–	0
No. 6 Bowling Green	5	–	1	–	0	8	–	1	–	0
Kent State	4	–	2	–	0	6	–	3	–	0
Miami (OH)	2	–	3	–	0	5	–	5	–	0
Western Michigan	2	–	4	–	0	4	–	4	–	1
Marshall	1	–	4	–	0	2	–	7	–	1
Toledo	0	–	6	–	0	2	–	7	–	0
$ – Conference champion; Rankings from AP small college poll

The 1960 Miami Redskins football team was an American football team that represented Miami University in the Mid-American Conference (MAC) during the 1960 college football season. In its fifth season under head coach John Pont, Miami compiled a 6–4 record (2-3 against MAC opponents), finished in third place in the MAC, and were outscored by all opponents by a combined total of 159 to 139.

Dave Kaiser, C. Edward Keating, Napoleon Reid, and Roger Turvy were the team captains. John Moore, who led the team with 616 rushing yards, 1,026 all-purpose yards, and 48 points, received the team's most valuable player awards. Other statistical leaders included Jack Gayheart with 441 passing yards and Howie Millisor with 261 receiving yards.

== Schedule ==
Date	Opponent	Site	Result	Attendance	Source
September 17	at Xavier*	Xavier Stadium; Cincinnati, OH	L 6–17	9,300	
September 24	Western Michigan	Miami Field; Oxford, OH	W 15–14	7,255	
October 1	Bowling Green	Miami Field; Oxford, OH	L 12–21	8,474–10,000	
October 8	Kent State	Miami Field; Oxford, OH	L 19–22	10,687	
October 15	at Villanova*	Villanova Stadium; Villanova, PA	W 17–7	5,000	
October 22	at No. 2 Ohio	Peden Stadium; Athens, OH (rivalry)	L 0–21	15,176	
October 29	at Army*	Michie Stadium; West Point, NY	L 7–30	19,126	
November 5	at Toledo	Glass Bowl; Toledo, OH	W 30–13	6,531–6,600	
November 12	Dayton*	Miami Field; Oxford, OH	W 23–8	10,000	
November 19	at Cincinnati*	Nippert Stadium; Cincinnati, OH (rivalry)	W 10–6	15,000	
*Non-conference game; Rankings from AP Poll released prior to the game; Source:
