= 1960 Liberty Bowl =

American college football game

- 2nd Liberty Bowl
Penn State Nittany Lions	Oregon Ducks
(6–3)	(7–2–1)
Independent	Independent
41	12
Head coach: Rip Engle	Head coach: Len Casanova
AP / Coaches; 16 / NR
	1	2	3	4	Total
Penn State	0	21	0	20	41
Oregon	6	0	6	0	12
- Date: December 17, 1960
- Season: 1960
- Stadium: Philadelphia Municipal Stadium
- Location: Philadelphia, Pennsylvania
- MVP: RB Dick Hoak (Penn State)
- Attendance: 16,624

The 1960 Liberty Bowl was a college football postseason bowl game played on December 17, 1960. The second edition of the Liberty Bowl, the game featured the Penn State Nittany Lions and the Oregon Ducks, both independent programs.

== Background ==
Penn State was making their second straight Liberty Bowl appearance, while Oregon was appearing in a bowl game after a two-year absence. 30 degree weather with three feet snowbanks made for a cold field.

== Game summary ==
- Oregon – Dave Grosz 1 run (kick failed), 5:40, 1st
- Penn State – Don Jonas 1 run (Henry Opperman kick), 12:50, 2nd
- Penn State – Al Gursky 2 run (Opperman kick), 2:25, 2nd
- Penn State – Dick Hoak 6 run (Opperman kick), :41, 2nd
- Oregon – Dave Grayson 10 run (pass failed), 5:31, 3rd
- Penn State – Ed Caye 1 run (Opperman kick), 9:03, 4th
- Penn State – Hoak 11 run (kick failed), 7:14, 4th
- Penn State – Dick Pae 33 pass from Hoak (Jonas kick), 5:14, 4th

Hoak rushed for 61 yards on 9 carries for two touchdowns with 67 yards passing in route to being named MVP. Oregon's Dave Grayson ran for 93 yards on 10 carries

== Aftermath ==
Oregon has not returned to the Liberty Bowl since this game while Penn State has returned just once, in 1979.

== Statistics ==
Statistics	Penn State	Oregon
First downs	25	17
Rushing yards	301	187
Passes intercepted	0	1
Passing yards	119	173
Total offense	420	360
Punting-Average	4–25.0	4–34.0
Fumbles–lost	3–1	4–2
Penalties	6–40	2–12
