= Dale Hall =

American football and basketball player and coach

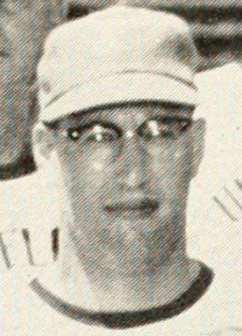
- Hall, c. 1955

Biographical details
- Born: June 21, 1924; Pittsburg, Kansas, U.S.
- Died: August 23, 1996 (aged 72); Palm Coast, Florida, U.S.

Playing career

Football
- 1943–1944: Army

Basketball
- 1942–1945: Army
- Position: Forward (basketball)

Coaching career (HC unless noted)

Football
- 1949–1950: Purdue (assistant)
- 1951: New Hampshire (assistant)
- 1952–1955: Florida (assistant)
- 1956–1958: Army (first assistant)
- 1959–1961: Army

Basketball
- 1951–1952: New Hampshire

Head coaching record
- Overall: 16–11–2 (football); 11–9 (basketball)

Accomplishments and honors

Awards
- Basketball; Sporting News POY (1944); 2× All-American (1944, 1945)

Dale Stanley Hall (June 21, 1924 – August 23, 1996) was an American football and basketball player and coach. He played football and basketball at the United States Military Academy, where he was a two-time All-American in basketball and was named the Sporting News Men's College Basketball Player of the Year in 1945. Hall served as the head football coach at West Point from 1959 to 1961, compiling a record of 16–11–2. He was also the head basketball coach at the University of New Hampshire during the 1951–52 season, tallying a mark of 11–9.

== Head coaching record ==
=== Football ===
Year	Team	Overall	Conference	Standing	Bowl/playoffs
Army Cadets (Independent) (1959–1961)
1959	Army	4–4–1			
1960	Army	6–3–1			
1961	Army	6–4			
Army:		16–11–2			
Total:		16–11–2			

== Personal life ==
Dale Stanley Hall was born on June 21, 1924, in Pittsburg Township, Mitchell County, Kansas, to Victor Lewis Hall and Hazel Marie Lance. He had two siblings: Olive Lucille Hall (sister) and Vernon Lee Hall (brother). Hall lived in Parsons, Labette County, Kansas. He was married to Laura Faye Stevenson (1924–1994). Hall died on August 23, 1996, in Flagler, Florida, at the age of 72.
