= Jim Cunningham (American football) =

American football player (born 1939)

No. 30, 34
- Position: Fullback

Personal information
- Born: March 11, 1939 (age 87); Connellsville, Pennsylvania, U.S.
- Listed height: 6 ft 0 in (1.83 m)
- Listed weight: 224 lb (102 kg)

Career information
- High school: Connellsville
- College: Pittsburgh
- NFL draft: 1961: 3rd round, 39th overall pick
- AFL draft: 1961: 14th round, 109th overall pick

Career history
- Washington Redskins (1961–1963); Wheeling/Ohio Valley Ironmen (1964–1969)

Awards and highlights
- First-team All-Eastern (1960)

Career NFL statistics
- Rushing yards: 337
- Rushing average: 2.8
- Receptions: 26
- Receiving yards: 219
- Total touchdowns: 5
- Stats at Pro Football Reference

James Walter Cunningham (born March 11, 1939) is an American former professional football player who was a fullback for the Washington Redskins of the National Football League (NFL). He played college football for the Pittsburgh Panthers and was selected 39th overall in the third round of the 1961 NFL draft. Cunningham was also chosen in the 14th round of the 1961 AFL draft by the New York Titans. Cunningham played three seasons for the Redskins from 1961 to 1963 and played minor league football with the Wheeling/Ohio Valley Ironmen for six seasons.
