= Dick Mills (American football) =

American football player (born 1939)

No. 67
- Position: Offensive guard

Personal information
- Born: March 6, 1939 (age 87); Indiana, Pennsylvania, U.S.
- Listed height: 6 ft 3 in (1.91 m)
- Listed weight: 240 lb (109 kg)

Career information
- High school: Beaver (Beaver, Pennsylvania)
- College: Pittsburgh
- NFL draft: 1961: 3rd round, 34th overall pick

Career history
- Detroit Lions (1961–1962); Philadelphia Eagles (1963)*; Pittsburgh Steelers (1964)*
- * Offseason or practice squad member only
- Stats at Pro Football Reference

Richard J. Mills (born March 6, 1939) is an American former professional football offensive guard who played for the Detroit Lions of the National Football League (NFL). He played college football for the Pittsburgh Panthers and was selected by the Lions in the third round of the 1961 NFL draft.

== Early life ==
Richard J. Mills was born on March 6, 1939, in Indiana, Pennsylvania. He attended Beaver Area High School in Beaver, Pennsylvania. He earned nine letters overall in high school, three each in football, basketball, and track.

== College career ==
Mills enrolled at the University of Pittsburgh to play college football for the Panthers. He was on the freshman team in 1957 and was a three-year varsity letterman from 1958 to 1960.

== Professional career ==
Mills was selected by the Detroit Lions in the third round, with the 34th overall pick, of the 1961 NFL draft and by the Dallas Texans in the ninth round, with the 69th overall pick, of the 1961 AFL draft. He chose to sign with the Lions on January 11, 1961. He played in all 14 games for Detroit in 1961 as a reserve offensive guard. Mills appeared in eight games, starting one, in 1962.

On August 15, 1963, Mills and Dave Lloyd were traded to the Philadelphia Eagles for a draft pick. Mills was released on August 27, 1963, after suffering an injury.

Mills signed with the Pittsburgh Steelers on July 6, 1964. He was released on August 10, 1964.

== Personal life ==
Mills' brother, John, played college basketball for the Pittsburgh Panthers. Dick was an assistant football coach for the Panthers in 1965 and graduated from the University of Pittsburgh School of Law in 1966. He was inducted into the Beaver County Sports Hall of Fame in 2000.
