= Penn State–Syracuse football rivalry =

American college football rivalry

- Penn State Nittany Lions Syracuse Orange
- First meeting: October 28, 1922; Tie, 0–0
- Latest meeting: August 31, 2013; Penn State, 23–17
- Next meeting: September 4, 2027

Statistics
- Total meetings: 71
- All-time series: Penn State leads, 43–23–5
- Largest victory: Penn State, 49–6 (1973)
- Longest win streak: Penn State, 16 (1971–1986)

Locations of Penn State and Syracuse

The Penn State–Syracuse football rivalry is an American college football rivalry between the Penn State Nittany Lions and Syracuse Orange. Penn State leads the series 43–23–5.

== History ==
The rivalry started in 1922, when Syracuse fought Penn State to a 0–0 tie. But it was during the 1950s and 1960s that the rivalry intensified, as it enjoyed a competitive and very controversial string of contests. In 1953, after Lenny Moore intercepted a pass to seal a 20–14 Penn State victory, he was shoved out of bounds into the Syracuse bench. A Syracuse player jumped on Moore and a wild brawl started. Fans jumped out of the stands to join in. The fighting went on for several minutes before order was restored and Penn State took a knee to end the game. Syracuse football was led by Ben Schwartzwalder, and Penn State by Rip Engle, then Joe Paterno. From 1950 to 1970, Syracuse won 11 games to Penn State's 10.

After Schwartzwalder retired in 1973, Syracuse floundered. Penn State won 16 straight from 1971 to 1986. Conference realignment and scheduling disagreements also dampened the intensity of the rivalry. Penn State fans and players increasingly turned their attention to the rivalry with Pittsburgh.

In 1987, Coach Dick MacPherson finally led Syracuse to a resounding 48–21 victory over the Nittany Lions in the Dome. Syracuse won again the following year in Happy Valley but lost the last two games before the series was suspended in 1991.

== Rivalry resumed ==
In 2002, it was announced that the two teams would revive the rivalry by scheduling a home-and-home series in 2008 and 2009.

After an almost twenty-year break in the series, the two programs played in Syracuse's Carrier Dome on September 13, 2008, with the Nittany Lions prevailing 55–13 over the Orange. The contest didn't generate a sellout crowd at the Carrier Dome. They met again the next year. Penn State won 28–7. After a 4-year break, in 2013 the two teams met again, this time at MetLife Stadium, in front of 61,202 fans; Penn State won 23–17.

On May 4, 2022, the two schools announced a home-and-home series in 2027 and 2028.

== Game results ==
| Penn State victories | Syracuse victories | Tie games |

| No. | Date | Location | Winning team | | Losing team | |
|---|---|---|---|---|---|---|
| 1 | October 28, 1922 | New York | Tie | 0 | Tie | 0 |
| 2 | November 3, 1923 | Syracuse | Syracuse | 10 | Penn State | 0 |
| 3 | October 25, 1924 | University Park | Syracuse | 10 | Penn State | 6 |
| 4 | October 31, 1925 | Syracuse | Syracuse | 7 | Penn State | 0 |
| 5 | October 23, 1926 | University Park | Syracuse | 10 | Penn State | 0 |
| 6 | October 22, 1927 | Syracuse | Penn State | 9 | Syracuse | 6 |
| 7 | October 27, 1928 | University Park | Tie | 6 | Tie | 6 |
| 8 | November 2, 1929 | Syracuse | Penn State | 6 | Syracuse | 4 |
| 9 | November 8, 1930 | University Park | Tie | 0 | Tie | 0 |
| 10 | October 24, 1931 | Syracuse | Syracuse | 7 | Penn State | 0 |
| 11 | October 22, 1932 | University Park | Syracuse | 12 | Penn State | 6 |
| 12 | November 4, 1933 | Syracuse | Syracuse | 12 | Penn State | 6 |
| 13 | November 3, 1934 | University Park | Syracuse | 16 | Penn State | 0 |
| 14 | November 2, 1935 | Syracuse | Syracuse | 7 | Penn State | 3 |
| 15 | October 31, 1936 | University Park | Penn State | 18 | Syracuse | 0 |
| 16 | October 30, 1937 | Syracuse | Syracuse | 19 | Penn State | 13 |
| 17 | October 29, 1938 | University Park | Penn State | 33 | Syracuse | 6 |
| 18 | October 28, 1939 | Syracuse | Tie | 6 | Tie | 6 |
| 19 | November 9, 1940 | Syracuse | Tie | 13 | Tie | 13 |
| 20 | November 8, 1941 | University Park | Penn State | 34 | #18 Syracuse | 19 |
| 21 | November 7, 1942 | University Park | Penn State | 18 | Syracuse | 13 |
| 22 | November 4, 1944 | Syracuse | Penn State | 41 | Syracuse | 0 |
| 23 | November 3, 1945 | University Park | Penn State | 26 | Syracuse | 0 |
| 24 | October 12, 1946 | Syracuse | Penn State | 9 | Syracuse | 0 |
| 25 | October 18, 1947 | University Park | #9 Penn State | 40 | Syracuse | 0 |
| 26 | October 8, 1948 | Syracuse | #10 Penn State | 34 | Syracuse | 14 |
| 27 | October 29, 1949 | University Park | Penn State | 33 | Syracuse | 21 |
| 28 | October 14, 1950 | Syracuse | Syracuse | 27 | Penn State | 7 |
| 29 | November 10, 1951 | University Park | Penn State | 32 | Syracuse | 13 |
| 30 | November 8, 1952 | Syracuse | #15 Syracuse | 25 | Penn State | 7 |
| 31 | October 17, 1953 | University Park | Penn State | 20 | Syracuse | 14 |
| 32 | October 2, 1954 | Syracuse | #10 Penn State | 13 | Syracuse | 0 |
| 33 | November 5, 1955 | University Park | Penn State | 21 | #18 Syracuse | 20 |
| 34 | November 3, 1956 | Syracuse | #17 Syracuse | 13 | #12 Penn State | 9 |
| 35 | October 26, 1957 | Syracuse | Penn State | 20 | Syracuse | 12 |
| 36 | October 25, 1958 | University Park | Syracuse | 14 | Penn State | 6 |

| No. | Date | Location | Winning team | | Losing team | |
|---|---|---|---|---|---|---|
| 37 | November 7, 1959 | University Park | #4 Syracuse | 20 | #7 Penn State | 18 |
| 38 | October 15, 1960 | Syracuse | #4 Syracuse | 21 | #20 Penn State | 15 |
| 39 | October 21, 1961 | University Park | Penn State | 14 | Syracuse | 0 |
| 40 | October 20, 1962 | University Park | Penn State | 20 | Syracuse | 19 |
| 41 | October 19, 1963 | Syracuse | Syracuse | 9 | Penn State | 0 |
| 42 | October 17, 1964 | University Park | #7 Syracuse | 21 | Penn State | 14 |
| 43 | October 16, 1965 | Syracuse | Syracuse | 28 | Penn State | 21 |
| 44 | November 5, 1966 | University Park | Syracuse | 12 | Penn State | 10 |
| 45 | October 28, 1967 | Syracuse | Penn State | 29 | Syracuse | 20 |
| 46 | December 7, 1968 | University Park | #3 Penn State | 30 | Syracuse | 12 |
| 47 | October 18, 1969 | Syracuse | #5 Penn State | 15 | Syracuse | 14 |
| 48 | October 17, 1970 | University Park | Syracuse | 24 | Penn State | 7 |
| 49 | October 16, 1971 | Syracuse | #9 Penn State | 31 | Syracuse | 0 |
| 50 | October 21, 1972 | University Park | #12 Penn State | 17 | Syracuse | 0 |
| 51 | October 20, 1973 | Syracuse | #5 Penn State | 49 | Syracuse | 6 |
| 52 | October 19, 1974 | University Park | #11 Penn State | 30 | Syracuse | 14 |
| 53 | October 18, 1975 | Syracuse | #9 Penn State | 19 | Syracuse | 7 |
| 54 | October 16, 1976 | University Park | Penn State | 27 | Syracuse | 3 |
| 55 | October 15, 1977 | Syracuse | #10 Penn State | 31 | Syracuse | 24 |
| 56 | October 21, 1978 | University Park | #2 Penn State | 45 | Syracuse | 15 |
| 57 | October 20, 1979 | East Rutherford | Penn State | 35 | Syracuse | 7 |
| 58 | October 18, 1980 | University Park | #12 Penn State | 24 | Syracuse | 7 |
| 59 | October 17, 1981 | Syracuse | #2 Penn State | 41 | Syracuse | 16 |
| 60 | October 16, 1982 | University Park | #8 Penn State | 28 | Syracuse | 7 |
| 61 | October 15, 1983 | Syracuse | Penn State | 17 | Syracuse | 6 |
| 62 | October 20, 1984 | University Park | #19 Penn State | 21 | Syracuse | 3 |
| 63 | October 19, 1985 | Syracuse | #6 Penn State | 24 | Syracuse | 20 |
| 64 | October 18, 1986 | University Park | #6 Penn State | 42 | Syracuse | 3 |
| 65 | October 17, 1987 | Syracuse | #13 Syracuse | 48 | #10 Penn State | 21 |
| 66 | October 15, 1988 | University Park | Syracuse | 24 | Penn State | 10 |
| 67 | October 14, 1989 | Syracuse | #23 Penn State | 34 | Syracuse | 12 |
| 68 | October 13, 1990 | University Park | Penn State | 27 | Syracuse | 21 |
| 69 | September 13, 2008 | Syracuse | #17 Penn State | 55 | Syracuse | 13 |
| 70 | September 12, 2009 | University Park | #5 Penn State | 28 | Syracuse | 7 |
| 71 | August 31, 2013 | East Rutherford | Penn State | 23 | Syracuse | 17 |
Series: Penn State leads 43–23–5

== See also ==
- List of NCAA college football rivalry games
