= Rip Engle =

American football player and sports coach (1906–1983)

Biographical details
- Born: March 26, 1906; Elk Lick, Pennsylvania, U.S.
- Died: March 7, 1983 (aged 76); Bellefonte, Pennsylvania, U.S.

Playing career
- 1929: Western Maryland
- Position: End

Coaching career (HC unless noted)

Football
- 1930–1940: Waynesboro HS (PA)
- 1941: Western Maryland (freshmen)
- 1942: Brown (ends)
- 1943: Brown (backs)
- 1944–1949: Brown
- 1950–1965: Penn State

Basketball
- 1941–1942: Western Maryland
- 1942–1946: Brown

Head coaching record
- Overall: 132–68–8 (college football); 53–55 (college basketball)
- Bowls: 3–1

Accomplishments and honors

Awards
- Amos Alonzo Stagg Award (1969)
- College Football Hall of Fame; Inducted in 1973 (profile)

Charles A. "Rip" Engle (March 26, 1906 – March 7, 1983) was an American football player and coach of football and basketball. He served as the head football coach at Brown University from 1944 to 1949 and at Pennsylvania State University from 1950 to 1965, compiling a career college football record of 132–68–8. Engle was also the head basketball coach at Western Maryland College (now known as McDaniel College) during the 1941–42 season and at Brown from 1942 to 1946, tallying a career college basketball mark of 53–55. He was inducted into the College Football Hall of Fame as a coach in 1973.

== Early life and playing career ==
Engle was born in Elk Lick Township, Somerset County, Pennsylvania. He played college football as an end at Western Maryland College, now McDaniel College.

== Coaching career ==
Engle's coaching record from 1944 to 1965, including stints at Brown University and Penn State, was 132–68–8. He played football at Western Maryland College, reportedly in the first game he ever saw.

Under the leadership of Engle at Brown, Joe Paterno developed as a capable quarterback and a skillful leader. After graduating in 1950, Paterno joined Engle at Penn State as an assistant coach. Upon Engle's retirement in February 1966, Paterno was named coach of the Nittany Lions for the 1966 season, a position he would hold until 2011. Engle's best season at Penn State was in 1962 when the Lions went 9–2, were ranked ninth in the country, and played in the Gator Bowl. He was inducted into the College Football Hall of Fame in 1973.

Engle developed a game called Angleball as a way for his players to maintain physical fitness in the off-season.

== Death ==
Engle died on March 7, 1983, at a nursing home in Bellefonte, Pennsylvania.

== Head coaching record ==
=== College football ===
Year	Team	Overall	Bowl/playoffs	Coaches^{#}	AP^{°}
Brown Bears (Independent) (1944–1949)
1944	Brown	3–4–1			
1945	Brown	3–4–1			
1946	Brown	3–5–1			
1947	Brown	4–4–1			
1948	Brown	7–2			
1949	Brown	8–1			
Brown:		28–20–4			
Penn State Nittany Lions (Independent) (1950–1965)
1950	Penn State	5–3–1			
1951	Penn State	5–4			
1952	Penn State	7–2–1			
1953	Penn State	6–3			
1954	Penn State	7–2		16	20
1955	Penn State	5–4			
1956	Penn State	6–2–1			
1957	Penn State	6–3			
1958	Penn State	6–3–1			
1959	Penn State	9–2	W Liberty	10	12
1960	Penn State	7–3	W Liberty		16
1961	Penn State	8–3	W Gator	19	17
1962	Penn State	9–2	L Gator	9	9
1963	Penn State	7–3		16	
1964	Penn State	6–4		14	
1965	Penn State	5–5			
Penn State:		104–48–4			
Total:		132–68–8			
^{#}Rankings from final Coaches Poll.; ^{°}Rankings from final AP Poll.

== See also ==
- List of presidents of the American Football Coaches Association
