= 1960 Ivy League football season =

- League: NCAA University Division
- Sport: Football
- Duration: September 24, 1960 – November 24, 1960
- Teams: 8

1961 NFL Draft
- Top draft pick: Ben Balme (Yale)
- Picked by: Philadelphia Eagles, 84th overall

Regular season
- Champions: Yale

Football seasons
- ← 1959 1961 →

1960 Ivy League football standings
	Conf.					Overall
Team	W		L		T	W		L		T
No. 14 Yale $	7	–	0	–	0	9	–	0	–	0
Princeton	6	–	1	–	0	7	–	2	–	0
Dartmouth	4	–	3	–	0	5	–	4	–	0
Harvard	4	–	3	–	0	5	–	4	–	0
Columbia	3	–	4	–	0	3	–	6	–	0
Penn	2	–	5	–	0	3	–	6	–	0
Brown	1	–	6	–	0	3	–	6	–	0
Cornell	1	–	6	–	0	2	–	7	–	0
$ – Conference champion; Rankings from AP poll

The 1960 Ivy League football season was the fifth season of college football play for the Ivy League and was part of the 1960 college football season. The season began on September 24, 1960, and ended on November 24, 1960. Ivy League teams were 10–6 against non-conference opponents and Yale won the conference championship.

== Season overview ==
Conf. Rank	Team	Head coach	AP final	AP high	Overall record	Conf. record	PPG	PAG
1	Yale	Jordan Olivar	#14	#14	9–0	7–0	28.1	8.1
2	Princeton	Dick Colman	NR	NR	7–2	6–1	25.8	14.8
3 (tie)	Dartmouth	Bob Blackman	NR	NR	5–4	4–3	10.9	7.3
3 (tie)	Harvard	John Yovicsin	NR	NR	5–4	4–3	10.0	13.2
5	Columbia	Aldo Donelli	NR	NR	3–6	3–4	14.0	21.2
6	Penn	John Stiegman	NR	NR	3–6	2–5	11.6	16.6
7 (tie)	Brown	John McLaughry	NR	NR	3–6	1–6	11.1	23.6
7 (tie)	Cornell	George K. James	NR	NR	2–7	1–6	8.7	18.6

== Schedule ==
Index to colors and formatting
Ivy League member won
Ivy League member lost
Ivy League teams in **bold**

=== Week 1 ===
Date	Visiting team	Home team	Site	Result
September 24	Connecticut	Yale	Yale Bowl • New Haven, CT	**W** 11–8
September 24	Rutgers	Princeton	Palmer Stadium • Princeton, NJ	**L** 8–13
September 24	New Hampshire	Dartmouth	Memorial Field • Hanover, NH	**W** 7–6
September 24	Holy Cross	Harvard	Harvard Stadium • Boston, MA	**W** 13–6
September 24	**Brown**	Columbia	Baker Field • New York City, NY	**COL** 37–0
September 24	Lafayette	Penn	Franklin Field • Philadelphia, PA	**W** 35–14
September 24	Colgate	Cornell	Schoellkopf Field • Ithaca, NY	**L** 8–28

=== Week 2 ===
Date	Visiting team	Home team	Site	Result
October 1	**Brown**	**Yale**	Yale Bowl • New Haven, CT	**YALE** 9–0
October 1	**Columbia**	**Princeton**	Palmer Stadium • Princeton, NJ	**PRIN** 49–0
October 1	**Penn**	**Dartmouth**	Memorial Field • Hanover, NH	**DART** 15–0
October 1	Massachusetts	**Harvard**	Harvard Stadium • Boston, MA	**L** 12–27
October 1	Bucknell	**Cornell**	Schoellkopf Field • Ithaca, NY	**W** 15–7

=== Week 3 ===
Date	Visiting team	Home team	Site	Result
October 8	**Columbia**	**Yale**	Yale Bowl • New Haven, CT	**YALE** 30–8
October 8	**Princeton**	**Penn**	Franklin Field • Philadelphia, PA	**PRIN** 21–0
October 8	**Dartmouth**	**Brown**	Brown Stadium • Providence, RI	**DART** 20–0
October 8	**Harvard**	**Cornell**	Schoellkopf Field • Ithaca, NY	**COR** 12–0

=== Week 4 ===
Date	Visiting team	Home team	Site	Result
October 15	**Cornell**	**Yale**	Yale Bowl • New Haven, CT	**YALE** 22–6
October 15	Colgate	**Princeton**	Palmer Stadium • Princeton, NJ	**W** 36–26
October 15	Holy Cross	**Dartmouth**	Memorial Field • Hanover, NH	**L** 8–9
October 15	**Harvard**	**Columbia**	Baker Field • New York City, NY	**HAR** 8–7
October 15	**Brown**	**Penn**	Franklin Field • Philadelphia, PA	**PENN** 36–7

=== Week 5 ===
Date	Visiting team	Home team	Site	Result
October 22	Colgate	Yale	Yale Bowl • New Haven, CT	**W** 36–14
October 22	**Princeton**	Cornell	Schoellkopf Field • Ithaca, NY	**PRIN** 21–18
October 22	**Dartmouth**	Harvard	Harvard Stadium • Boston, MA	**HAR** 9–6
October 22	Holy Cross	Columbia	Baker Field • New York City, NY	**L** 6–27
October 22	#4 Navy	Penn	Franklin Field • Philadelphia, PA	**L** 0–27
October 22	Rhode Island	Brown	Brown Stadium • Providence, RI	**W** 36–14

=== Week 6 ===
Date	Visiting team	Home team	Site	Result
October 29	**Dartmouth**	**Yale**	Yale Bowl • New Haven, CT	**YALE** 29–0
October 29	**Brown**	**Princeton**	Palmer Stadium • Princeton, NJ	**PRIN** 54–21
October 29	**Penn**	**Harvard**	Harvard Stadium • Boston, MA	**HAR** 8–0
October 29	**Cornell**	**Columbia**	Baker Field • New York City, NY	**COL** 44–6

=== Week 7 ===
Date	Visiting team	Home team	Site	Result
November 5	**Penn**	**Yale**	Yale Bowl • New Haven, CT	**YALE** 34–9
November 5	**Harvard**	**Princeton**	Palmer Stadium • Princeton, NJ	**PRIN** 14–12
November 5	**Columbia**	**Dartmouth**	Memorial Field • Hanover, NH	**DART** 22–6
November 5	**Cornell**	**Brown**	Brown Stadium • Providence, RI	**BROWN** 7–6

=== Week 8 ===
Date	Visiting team	Home team	Site	Result
November 12	**Princeton**	#17 **Yale**	Yale Bowl • New Haven, CT	**YALE** 43–22
November 12	**Dartmouth**	**Cornell**	Schoellkopf Field • Ithaca, NY	**DART** 20–0
November 12	**Brown**	**Harvard**	Harvard Stadium • Boston, MA	**HAR** 22–8
November 12	**Columbia**	**Penn**	Franklin Field • Philadelphia, PA	**COL** 16–6

=== Week 9 ===
Date	Visiting team	Home team	Site	Result
November 19	#14 **Yale**	**Harvard**	Harvard Stadium • Boston, MA	**YALE** 39–6
November 19	**Dartmouth**	**Princeton**	Palmer Stadium • Princeton, NJ	**PRIN** 7–0
November 19	Rutgers	**Columbia**	Baker Field • New York City, NY	**L** 2–43
November 19	Colgate	**Brown**	Brown Stadium • Providence, RI	**W** 21–14
November 24	**Cornell**	**Penn**	Franklin Field • Philadelphia, PA	**PENN** 18–7

== 1961 NFL draft ==
Two Ivy League players were drafted in the 1961 NFL draft, held in December 1960: Ben Balme and Mike Pyle.

Rnd.	Pick No.	NFL team	Player	Pos.	College	Conf.	Notes
6	84	Philadelphia Eagles	Ben Balme	G	Yale	Ivy	
7	89	Chicago Bears	Mike Pyle	C	Yale	Ivy	
