= 1960 Lafayette Leopards football team =

American college football season

1960 Lafayette Leopards football
- Conference: Middle Atlantic Conference
- University Division
- Record: 5–4 (4–3 MAC)
- Head coach: James McConlogue (3rd season)
- Captains: Charles Bartos; Robert Howard
- Home stadium: Fisher Field

1960 Middle Atlantic Conference football standings
	Conf.					Overall
Team	W		L		T	W		L		T
University Division
Rutgers x	4	–	0	–	0	8	–	1	–	0
Bucknell	5	–	1	–	0	7	–	2	–	0
Lehigh	3	–	2	–	0	4	–	5	–	0
Lafayette	4	–	3	–	0	5	–	4	–	0
Gettysburg	2	–	3	–	0	3	–	6	–	0
Delaware	1	–	4	–	0	2	–	6	–	1
Temple	0	–	5	–	0	2	–	7	–	0
Muhlenberg *	1	–	2	–	0	6	–	3	–	0
Northern College Division
Albright x	6	–	0	–	0	9	–	0	–	0
Wagner x	6	–	0	–	0	9	–	0	–	0
Lebanon Valley	6	–	1	–	0	7	–	2	–	0
Susquehanna	5	–	1	–	0	7	–	1	–	0
Juniata	4	–	1	–	0	5	–	2	–	0
Scranton	3	–	3	–	0	4	–	4	–	0
Upsala	1	–	3	–	1	1	–	5	–	2
Wilkes	2	–	7	–	0	2	–	7	–	0
Moravian	1	–	5	–	1	1	–	6	–	1
Hofstra *	2	–	0	–	0	7	–	1	–	1
Lycoming *	1	–	3	–	0	3	–	5	–	0
Southern College Division
Johns Hopkins x	5	–	1	–	0	5	–	2	–	1
Pennsylvania Military	5	–	3	–	0	5	–	4	–	0
Western Maryland	3	–	2	–	0	6	–	3	–	0
Ursinus	3	–	3	–	0	3	–	4	–	0
Swarthmore	2	–	3	–	0	2	–	5	–	0
Dickinson	1	–	6	–	0	1	–	7	–	0
Drexel	0	–	6	–	0	0	–	7	–	1
Haverford	0	–	7	–	0	0	–	7	–	0
Franklin & Marshall *	1	–	2	–	0	2	–	6	–	0
No. 5 West Chester *	0	–	0	–	0	9	–	0	–	0
x – Division champion/co-champions; * – Ineligible for championship due to insufficient conference games; Rankings from AP Poll

The 1960 Lafayette Leopards football team was an American football team that represented Lafayette College during the 1960 college football season. Lafayette finished fourth in the University Division of the Middle Atlantic Conference and last in the Middle Three Conference.

In their third year under head coach James McConlogue, the Leopards compiled a 5–4 record. Charles Bartos and Robert Howard were the team captains.

With a 4–3 record in the MAC University Division, Lafayette had more wins than the third-place team, Lehigh (3–2), but placed below the Engineers because of their win percentages. The Leopards went 0–2 against the Middle Three, losing to both Lehigh and Rutgers.

Lafayette played its home games at Fisher Field on College Hill in Easton, Pennsylvania.

== Schedule ==
Date	Opponent	Site	Result	Attendance	Source
September 24	at Penn*	Franklin Field; Philadelphia, PA	L 14–35	15,617	
October 1	Muhlenberg	Fisher Field; Easton, PA	W 20–14	6,500–6,751	
October 8	at Delaware	Delaware Stadium; Newark, DE	W 3–0	7,000–7,200	
October 15	Temple	Fisher Field; Easton, PA	W 9–7	6,873–7,865	
October 22	at Bucknell	Memorial Stadium; Lewisburg, PA	L 0–28	10,000	
October 29	Gettysburg	Fisher Field; Easton, PA	W 10–7	8,346–9,000	
November 5	at Rutgers	Rutgers Stadium; Piscataway, NJ	L 8–36	13,500	
November 12	No. 4 Tufts*	Ellis Oval; Somerville, MA	W 22–7	5,000–7,000	
November 19	Lehigh	Fisher Field; Easton, PA (The Rivalry)	L 3–26	18,000–19,000	
*Non-conference game; Rankings from UPI Poll released prior to the game
