= 1960 Temple Owls football team =

American college football season

1960 Temple Owls football
- Conference: Middle Atlantic Conference
- University Division
- Record: 2–7 (0–5 MAC)
- Head coach: George Makris (1st season)
- Captain: Game captains
- Home stadium: Temple Stadium

1960 Middle Atlantic Conference football standings
	Conf.					Overall
Team	W		L		T	W		L		T
University Division
Rutgers x	4	–	0	–	0	8	–	1	–	0
Bucknell	5	–	1	–	0	7	–	2	–	0
Lehigh	3	–	2	–	0	4	–	5	–	0
Lafayette	4	–	3	–	0	5	–	4	–	0
Gettysburg	2	–	3	–	0	3	–	6	–	0
Delaware	1	–	4	–	0	2	–	6	–	1
Temple	0	–	5	–	0	2	–	7	–	0
Muhlenberg *	1	–	2	–	0	6	–	3	–	0
Northern College Division
Albright x	6	–	0	–	0	9	–	0	–	0
Wagner x	6	–	0	–	0	9	–	0	–	0
Lebanon Valley	6	–	1	–	0	7	–	2	–	0
Susquehanna	5	–	1	–	0	7	–	1	–	0
Juniata	4	–	1	–	0	5	–	2	–	0
Scranton	3	–	3	–	0	4	–	4	–	0
Upsala	1	–	3	–	1	1	–	5	–	2
Wilkes	2	–	7	–	0	2	–	7	–	0
Moravian	1	–	5	–	1	1	–	6	–	1
Hofstra *	2	–	0	–	0	7	–	1	–	1
Lycoming *	1	–	3	–	0	3	–	5	–	0
Southern College Division
Johns Hopkins x	5	–	1	–	0	5	–	2	–	1
Pennsylvania Military	5	–	3	–	0	5	–	4	–	0
Western Maryland	3	–	2	–	0	6	–	3	–	0
Ursinus	3	–	3	–	0	3	–	4	–	0
Swarthmore	2	–	3	–	0	2	–	5	–	0
Dickinson	1	–	6	–	0	1	–	7	–	0
Drexel	0	–	6	–	0	0	–	7	–	1
Haverford	0	–	7	–	0	0	–	7	–	0
Franklin & Marshall *	1	–	2	–	0	2	–	6	–	0
No. 5 West Chester *	0	–	0	–	0	9	–	0	–	0
x – Division champion/co-champions; * – Ineligible for championship due to insufficient conference games; Rankings from AP Poll

The 1960 Temple Owls football team was an American football team that represented Temple University as a member of the Middle Atlantic Conference (MAC) during the 1960 college football season. In its first season under head coach George Makris, the team compiled a 2–7 record (0–5 against MAC opponents) and finished seventh out of eight teams in the MAC's University Division. The team played its home games at Temple Stadium in Philadelphia.

Joe Nejman, Lou Paludi, and Wally Porter were assistant coaches.

== Schedule ==
Date	Opponent	Site	Result	Attendance	Source
September 24	Merchant Marine*	Temple Stadium; Philadelphia, PA	W 26–13	10,000	
October 1	Buffalo*	Temple Stadium; Philadelphia, PA	L 12–21	9,500	
October 8	at Muhlenberg	Muhlenberg Field; Allentown, PA	L 14–17	4,000	
October 15	at Lafayette	Fisher Field; Easton, PA	L 7–9	6,873–7,865	
October 22	at Hofstra*	Hofstra College Stadium; Hempstead, NY	L 4–6	3,800–7,000	
October 29	Drexel^{†}*	Temple Stadium; Philadelphia, PA	W 30–8	4,500	
November 5	Delaware	Temple Stadium; Philadelphia, PA	L 12–26	4,000	
November 12	at Bucknell	Memorial Stadium; Lewisburg, PA	L 0–23	5,000	
November 19	Gettysburg	Temple Stadium; Philadelphia, PA	L 8–14	5,500	
*Non-conference game; ^{†}Homecoming
