= John Potsklan =

American football player and coach of football and basketball

Biographical details
- Born: September 24, 1920; Hiller, Pennsylvania, U.S.
- Died: June 22, 1990 (aged 69); Reading, Pennsylvania, U.S.

Playing career

Football
- 1941: Penn State
- 1946–1947: Penn State
- Position: End

Coaching career (HC unless noted)

Football
- 1953–1954: Albright (assistant)
- 1955–1984: Albright

Basketball
- 1966–1967: Albright
- 1968–1974: Albright
- 1980–1985: Albright

Head coaching record
- Overall: 144–122–5 (football); 79–113 (basketball)
- Tournaments: 0–2 (NCAA D-III playoffs)

Accomplishments and honors

Championships
- 7 MAC Northern College / Northern Division (1959–1960, 1968, 1972, 1975–1977)

John Anthony Potsklan Jr. (September 24, 1920 – June 22, 1990) was an American football player and coach of football and basketball. He served as the head football coach at Albright College in Reading, Pennsylvania from 1955 to 1984, compiling a record of 144–122–5. Potsklan also had three stints also the head men's basketball coach at Albright, in 1966–67, from 1968 to 1974, and 1980 to 1985, tallying a mark of 79–113.

== Early years, military service, and playing career ==
Potsklan was born in 1920 in Hiller, Pennsylvania. He attended Brownsville High School in Fayette County, Pennsylvania, where he played three sports. He then played college football as an end for the Penn State Nittany Lions in 1941, 1946, and 1947.

Potsklan's college career was interrupted by military service with a bomber squadron in the United States Army Air Corps during World War II. He was shot down over Germany and was held in a German prisoner of war camp.

Potsklan also served for a time with the Pittsburgh Steelers of the National Football League.

== Coaching career ==
Potsklan was an assistant coach at Albright College in Reading, Pennsylvania in 1953 and 1954. He took over as head coach in 1955. He remained as head coach for 30 years. He led the 1960 Albright team to a perfect 9–0 record and followed that with a 7–0–1 record in 1961. He led Albright's football team to seven Middle Atlantic Conference (MAC) North Division championships (1959, 1960, 1968, 1972, 1975, 1976, and 1977) and was named MAC coach of the year six times. He retired at the end of the 1984 season with a 144–122–5 record. He also coached the Albright basketball team.

== Later years ==
Potsklan died in 1990 in Reading, Pennsylvania at age 69.

== Head coaching record ==
=== Football ===
Year	Team	Overall	Conference	Standing	Bowl/playoffs
Albright Lions (Independent) (1955–1957)
1955	Albright	2–7			
1956	Albright	2–7			
1957	Albright	1–7–1			
Albright Lions (Middle Atlantic Conference) (1958–1984)
1958	Albright	2–6–1	2–4–1	8th (Northern College)	
1959	Albright	7–3	6–1	1st (Northern College)	
1960	Albright	9–0	6–0	T–1st (Northern College)	
1961	Albright	7–0–1	4–0–1	2nd (Northern College)	
1962	Albright	3–5	2–3	T–5th (Northern College)	
1963	Albright	3–5	2–3	3rd (Northern College)	
1964	Albright	8–1	6–1	2nd (Northern College)	
1965	Albright	4–5	3–4	6th (Northern College)	
1966	Albright	4–5	4–4	T–5th (Northern College)	
1967	Albright	5–4	4–3	5th (Northern College)	
1968	Albright	8–1	7–0	T–1st (Northern College)	
1969	Albright	3–6	3–4	6th (Northern College)	
1970	Albright	4–5	4–2	2nd (Northern)	
1971	Albright	3–5–1	3–3–1	2nd (Northern)	
1972	Albright	8–1	7–0	2nd (Northern)	
1973	Albright	5–5	5–3	3rd (Northern)	
1974	Albright	6–3	4–2	3rd (Northern)	
1975	Albright	8–2	6–0	1st (Northern)	L NCAA Division III Quarterfinal
1976	Albright	8–2	6–0	1st (Northern)	L NCAA Division III Quarterfinal
1977	Albright	7–2	5–1	T–1st (Northern)	
1978	Albright	3–6	3–3	T–4th (Northern)	
1979	Albright	3–6	3–4	T–5th (Northern)	
1980	Albright	5–4	4–3	T–3rd (Northern)	
1981	Albright	5–3–1	4–2–1	T–3rd (Northern)	
1982	Albright	3–6	2–5	6th (Northern)	
1983	Albright	5–4	4–4	T–5th	
1984	Albright	3–6	2–6	7th	
Albright:		144–122–5	111–65–4		
Total:		144–122–5			
National championship Conference title Conference division title or championship game berth
