= 1960 Hofstra Flying Dutchmen football team =

American college football season

1960 Hofstra Flying Dutchmen football
- Conference: Middle Atlantic Conference
- Northern College Division
- Record: 7–1–1 (2–0 MAC)
- Head coach: Howdy Myers (11th season)
- Captains: Bob DeNeef; Lou DiBlasi
- Home stadium: Hofstra College Stadium

1960 Middle Atlantic Conference football standings
	Conf.					Overall
Team	W		L		T	W		L		T
University Division
Rutgers x	4	–	0	–	0	8	–	1	–	0
Bucknell	5	–	1	–	0	7	–	2	–	0
Lehigh	3	–	2	–	0	4	–	5	–	0
Lafayette	4	–	3	–	0	5	–	4	–	0
Gettysburg	2	–	3	–	0	3	–	6	–	0
Delaware	1	–	4	–	0	2	–	6	–	1
Temple	0	–	5	–	0	2	–	7	–	0
Muhlenberg *	1	–	2	–	0	6	–	3	–	0
Northern College Division
Albright x	6	–	0	–	0	9	–	0	–	0
Wagner x	6	–	0	–	0	9	–	0	–	0
Lebanon Valley	6	–	1	–	0	7	–	2	–	0
Susquehanna	5	–	1	–	0	7	–	1	–	0
Juniata	4	–	1	–	0	5	–	2	–	0
Scranton	3	–	3	–	0	4	–	4	–	0
Upsala	1	–	3	–	1	1	–	5	–	2
Wilkes	2	–	7	–	0	2	–	7	–	0
Moravian	1	–	5	–	1	1	–	6	–	1
Hofstra *	2	–	0	–	0	7	–	1	–	1
Lycoming *	1	–	3	–	0	3	–	5	–	0
Southern College Division
Johns Hopkins x	5	–	1	–	0	5	–	2	–	1
Pennsylvania Military	5	–	3	–	0	5	–	4	–	0
Western Maryland	3	–	2	–	0	6	–	3	–	0
Ursinus	3	–	3	–	0	3	–	4	–	0
Swarthmore	2	–	3	–	0	2	–	5	–	0
Dickinson	1	–	6	–	0	1	–	7	–	0
Drexel	0	–	6	–	0	0	–	7	–	1
Haverford	0	–	7	–	0	0	–	7	–	0
Franklin & Marshall *	1	–	2	–	0	2	–	6	–	0
No. 5 West Chester *	0	–	0	–	0	9	–	0	–	0
x – Division champion/co-champions; * – Ineligible for championship due to insufficient conference games; Rankings from AP Poll

The 1960 Hofstra Flying Dutchmen football team was an American football team that represented Hofstra College during the 1960 college football season. Hofstra had one of the better records in the Northern College Division of the Middle Atlantic Conference (MAC), but was ineligible for the championship.

In their 11th year under head coach Howard "Howdy" Myers Jr., the Flying Dutchmen compiled a 7–1–1 record, and outscored opponents 158 to 78. Bob DeNeef and Lou DiBlasi were the team captains.

Hofstra was one of three teams in the MAC Northern Division that finished the year undefeated in conference play. The other two, Albright and Wagner, shared the division championship, but Hofstra was excluded from title contention. Conference rules required teams to play at least five games against opponents from the MAC's two "college" divisions, and Hofstra only played two. Three of its games were against MAC University Division members (Delaware, Gettysburg and Temple), but these did not count as conference games.

The Flying Dutchmen played their home games at Hofstra College Stadium in Hempstead on Long Island, New York.

== Schedule ==
Date	Opponent	Site	Result	Attendance	Source
September 24	at Scranton	Memorial Stadium; Scranton, PA	W 28–14	7,000	
October 1	Upsala	Hofstra College Stadium; Hempstead, NY	W 20–6	5,600	
October 8	at Bridgeport*	Hedges Stadium; Bridgeport, CT	T 0–0	4,000	
October 15	C.W. Post*	Hofstra College Stadium; Hempstead, NY	W 22–7	8,023	
October 22	Temple*	Hofstra College Stadium; Hempstead, NY	W 6–4	3,800–7,000	
October 29	at Delaware*	Delaware Stadium; Newark, DE	L 0–20	3,800–4,000	
November 5	vs. Gettysburg*	Myers Athletic Field; Hanover, PA	W 26–8	1,200–1,500	
November 12	Springfield*	Hofstra College Stadium; Hempstead, NY	W 24–7	3,900	
November 19	Merchant Marine*	Hofstra College Stadium; Hempstead, NY	W 32–12		
*Non-conference game
