= 1960 Wagner Seahawks football team =

American college football season

1960 Wagner Seahawks football

MAC Northern College Division co-champion
- Conference: Middle Atlantic Conference
- Northern College Division
- Record: 9–0 (6–0 MAC)
- Head coach: Mickey Sullivan (4th season)
- Home stadium: Grymes Hill Stadium

1960 Middle Atlantic Conference football standings
	Conf.					Overall
Team	W		L		T	W		L		T
University Division
Rutgers x	4	–	0	–	0	8	–	1	–	0
Bucknell	5	–	1	–	0	7	–	2	–	0
Lehigh	3	–	2	–	0	4	–	5	–	0
Lafayette	4	–	3	–	0	5	–	4	–	0
Gettysburg	2	–	3	–	0	3	–	6	–	0
Delaware	1	–	4	–	0	2	–	6	–	1
Temple	0	–	5	–	0	2	–	7	–	0
Muhlenberg *	1	–	2	–	0	6	–	3	–	0
Northern College Division
Albright x	6	–	0	–	0	9	–	0	–	0
Wagner x	6	–	0	–	0	9	–	0	–	0
Lebanon Valley	6	–	1	–	0	7	–	2	–	0
Susquehanna	5	–	1	–	0	7	–	1	–	0
Juniata	4	–	1	–	0	5	–	2	–	0
Scranton	3	–	3	–	0	4	–	4	–	0
Upsala	1	–	3	–	1	1	–	5	–	2
Wilkes	2	–	7	–	0	2	–	7	–	0
Moravian	1	–	5	–	1	1	–	6	–	1
Hofstra *	2	–	0	–	0	7	–	1	–	1
Lycoming *	1	–	3	–	0	3	–	5	–	0
Southern College Division
Johns Hopkins x	5	–	1	–	0	5	–	2	–	1
Pennsylvania Military	5	–	3	–	0	5	–	4	–	0
Western Maryland	3	–	2	–	0	6	–	3	–	0
Ursinus	3	–	3	–	0	3	–	4	–	0
Swarthmore	2	–	3	–	0	2	–	5	–	0
Dickinson	1	–	6	–	0	1	–	7	–	0
Drexel	0	–	6	–	0	0	–	7	–	1
Haverford	0	–	7	–	0	0	–	7	–	0
Franklin & Marshall *	1	–	2	–	0	2	–	6	–	0
No. 5 West Chester *	0	–	0	–	0	9	–	0	–	0
x – Division champion/co-champions; * – Ineligible for championship due to insufficient conference games; Rankings from AP Poll

The 1960 Wagner Seahawks football team represented Wagner College as a member of the Middle Atlantic Conference (MAC) during the 1960 college football season. Led by fourth-year head coach Mickey Sullivan, the Seahawks compiled an overall record of 9–0, with a mark of 6–0 in conference play, and finished tied for the MAC Northern College Division championship with Albright.

On offense, the Seahawks scored 256 points and gained 2,791 yards of total offense (1,142 rushing, 1,649 passing). On defense, they gave up 103 points and 2,004 yards of total offense (1,112 rushing, 892 passing).

The team's individual statistical leaders included quarterback Don Cavalli with 1,502 passing yards and 18 touchdown passes; halfback Neil Johnston with 406 rushing yards and 56 points scored; end Al Ferrie with 34 receptions for 738 yards and eight touchdowns; and halfback Frank Melos with 68 points scored.

== Schedule ==
Date	Opponent	Site	Result	Attendance	Source
September 24	Pennsylvania Military	Grymes Hill Stadium; Staten Island, NY	W 25–20	3,900	
October 1	at Haverford	Walton Field; Haverford, PA	W 36–0		
October 8	Trenton State*	Grymes Hill Stadium; Staten Island, NY	W 20–18	2,800	
October 15	Merchant Marine*	Grymes Hill Stadium; Staten Island, NY	W 21–12	4,300	
October 22	Dickinson	Grymes Hill Stadium; Staten Island, NY	W 47–6	5,800	
October 29	at Ursinus	Collegeville, PA	W 49–20		
November 5	Hamilton*	Grymes Hill Stadium; Staten Island, NY	W 26–8	3,600	
November 12	at Moravian	Bethlehem, PA	W 13–0		
November 19	Upsala	Grymes Hill Stadium; Staten Island, NY	W 19–14	6,000	
*Non-conference game
