= 1960 Delaware Fightin' Blue Hens football team =

American college football season

1960 Delaware Fightin' Blue Hens football
- Conference: Middle Atlantic Conference
- University Division
- Record: 3–5–1 (2–3 MAC)
- Head coach: David M. Nelson (10th season)
- Captain: Mickey Heinecken
- Home stadium: Delaware Stadium

1960 Middle Atlantic Conference football standings
	Conf.					Overall
Team	W		L		T	W		L		T
University Division
Rutgers x	4	–	0	–	0	8	–	1	–	0
Bucknell	5	–	1	–	0	7	–	2	–	0
Lehigh	3	–	2	–	0	4	–	5	–	0
Lafayette	4	–	3	–	0	5	–	4	–	0
Gettysburg	2	–	3	–	0	3	–	6	–	0
Delaware	1	–	4	–	0	2	–	6	–	1
Temple	0	–	5	–	0	2	–	7	–	0
Muhlenberg *	1	–	2	–	0	6	–	3	–	0
Northern College Division
Albright x	6	–	0	–	0	9	–	0	–	0
Wagner x	6	–	0	–	0	9	–	0	–	0
Lebanon Valley	6	–	1	–	0	7	–	2	–	0
Susquehanna	5	–	1	–	0	7	–	1	–	0
Juniata	4	–	1	–	0	5	–	2	–	0
Scranton	3	–	3	–	0	4	–	4	–	0
Upsala	1	–	3	–	1	1	–	5	–	2
Wilkes	2	–	7	–	0	2	–	7	–	0
Moravian	1	–	5	–	1	1	–	6	–	1
Hofstra *	2	–	0	–	0	7	–	1	–	1
Lycoming *	1	–	3	–	0	3	–	5	–	0
Southern College Division
Johns Hopkins x	5	–	1	–	0	5	–	2	–	1
Pennsylvania Military	5	–	3	–	0	5	–	4	–	0
Western Maryland	3	–	2	–	0	6	–	3	–	0
Ursinus	3	–	3	–	0	3	–	4	–	0
Swarthmore	2	–	3	–	0	2	–	5	–	0
Dickinson	1	–	6	–	0	1	–	7	–	0
Drexel	0	–	6	–	0	0	–	7	–	1
Haverford	0	–	7	–	0	0	–	7	–	0
Franklin & Marshall *	1	–	2	–	0	2	–	6	–	0
No. 5 West Chester *	0	–	0	–	0	9	–	0	–	0
x – Division champion/co-champions; * – Ineligible for championship due to insufficient conference games; Rankings from AP Poll

The 1960 Delaware Fightin' Blue Hens football team was an American football team that represented the University of Delaware in the Middle Atlantic Conference during the 1960 college football season. In its tenth season under head coach David M. Nelson, the team compiled a 3–5–1 record (2–3 against MAC opponents) and was outscored by a total of 122 to 114. Mickey Heinecken was the team captain. The team played its home games at Delaware Stadium in Newark, Delaware.

== Schedule ==
Date	Opponent	Site	Result	Attendance	Source
September 24	at Lehigh	Taylor Stadium; Bethlehem, PA (rivalry)	L 14–27	8,500	
October 1	Amherst*	Delaware Stadium; Newark, DE	L 12–15	6,200–6,320	
October 8	Lafayette	Delaware Stadium; Newark, DE	L 0–3	7,000–7,200	
October 15	at New Hampshire*	Cowell Stadium; Durham, NH	L 14–31	6,900	
October 22	at Marshall*	Fairfield Stadium; Huntington, WV	T 6–6	7,000	
October 29	Hofstra*	Delaware Stadium; Newark, DE	W 20–0	4,000	
November 5	at Temple	Temple Stadium; Philadelphia, PA	W 26–12	4,000	
November 12	Rutgers	Delaware Stadium; Newark, DE	L 0–22	7,500	
November 19	Bucknell	Delaware Stadium; Newark, DE	W 22–6	6,000–6,200	
*Non-conference game
