= 1960 Drexel Dragons football team =

American college football season

1960 Drexel Dragons football
- Conference: Middle Atlantic Conference
- Southern College Division
- Record: 0–7–1 (0–6 MAC)
- Head coach: Jack Hinkle (3rd season)
- Captains: Dick Fraser; Pete Gable
- Home stadium: Drexel Field

1960 Middle Atlantic Conference football standings
	Conf.					Overall
Team	W		L		T	W		L		T
University Division
Rutgers x	4	–	0	–	0	8	–	1	–	0
Bucknell	5	–	1	–	0	7	–	2	–	0
Lehigh	3	–	2	–	0	4	–	5	–	0
Lafayette	4	–	3	–	0	5	–	4	–	0
Gettysburg	2	–	3	–	0	3	–	6	–	0
Delaware	1	–	4	–	0	2	–	6	–	1
Temple	0	–	5	–	0	2	–	7	–	0
Muhlenberg *	1	–	2	–	0	6	–	3	–	0
Northern College Division
Albright x	6	–	0	–	0	9	–	0	–	0
Wagner x	6	–	0	–	0	9	–	0	–	0
Lebanon Valley	6	–	1	–	0	7	–	2	–	0
Susquehanna	5	–	1	–	0	7	–	1	–	0
Juniata	4	–	1	–	0	5	–	2	–	0
Scranton	3	–	3	–	0	4	–	4	–	0
Upsala	1	–	3	–	1	1	–	5	–	2
Wilkes	2	–	7	–	0	2	–	7	–	0
Moravian	1	–	5	–	1	1	–	6	–	1
Hofstra *	2	–	0	–	0	7	–	1	–	1
Lycoming *	1	–	3	–	0	3	–	5	–	0
Southern College Division
Johns Hopkins x	5	–	1	–	0	5	–	2	–	1
Pennsylvania Military	5	–	3	–	0	5	–	4	–	0
Western Maryland	3	–	2	–	0	6	–	3	–	0
Ursinus	3	–	3	–	0	3	–	4	–	0
Swarthmore	2	–	3	–	0	2	–	5	–	0
Dickinson	1	–	6	–	0	1	–	7	–	0
Drexel	0	–	6	–	0	0	–	7	–	1
Haverford	0	–	7	–	0	0	–	7	–	0
Franklin & Marshall *	1	–	2	–	0	2	–	6	–	0
No. 5 West Chester *	0	–	0	–	0	9	–	0	–	0
x – Division champion/co-champions; * – Ineligible for championship due to insufficient conference games; Rankings from AP Poll

The 1960 Drexel Dragons football team represented the Drexel Institute of Technology (renamed Drexel University in 1970) as a member of the Middle Atlantic Conference during the 1960 college football season. Jack Hinkle was the team's head coach.

== Schedule ==
Date	Time	Opponent	Site	Result	Attendance	Source
October 1	8:00 pm	at Lebanon Valley	Lebanon High School Stadium; Lebanon, PA	L 8–40	2,500	
October 8	1:30 pm	Albright	Drexel Field; Philadelphia, PA	L 6–34	1,500	
October 15	1:30 pm	at Scranton	Scranton Memorial Stadium; Scranton, PA	L 9–27	2,432	
October 22	1:30 pm	Pennsylvania Military^{†}	Drexel Field; Philadelphia, PA	L 12–13	6,500	
October 29	1:30 pm	at Temple*	Temple Stadium; Philadelphia, PA	L 8–30	4,500	
November 5	1:30 pm	at Juniata	College Field; Huntingdon, PA	L 0–42	500	
November 12	1:30 pm	Western Maryland	Drexel Field; Philadelphia, PA	L 0–9	1,000	
November 19	1:30 pm	Delaware Valley*	Drexel Field; Philadelphia, PA	T 0–0	1,000	
*Non-conference game; ^{†}Homecoming; All times are in Eastern time

== Roster ==
1960 Drexel Dragons football team roster
Players
Coaches
Offense

Pos.	#	Name	Class
TE		Charles Bedser
TE		Paul Slawek
TE		Cliff Dirkes
TE		Bob Rae
TE		Gordon Vestre
OT		Mike Eyerly
OT		Paul Eichhorn
OT		Dick Kohl
OT		Ron Kidd
OT		Ron Bales
OT		Walt Danz
OT		Matt Pelligrino
G		Dick Fraser (C)
G		Pete Gable (C)
G		Hank Grabowski
G		John Dewey
G		Phil Paino
C		George Kelley
C		Jerry Humphrey
HB		Al Wagner	So
HB		Joe Buffalo	So
HB		Butch Lewoc
HB		Jack Salvucci
HB		Rick Mack
HB		Ron Corson
FB		Jack McGovern
FB		Larry Bowne	So
FB		Russ Poling
QB		Jim Holden
QB		Gene Bishop	So
QB		Joe Nowak

Defense

Pos.	#	Name	Class

Special teams

Pos.	#	Name	Class

Head coach

- Jack Hinkle (Syracuse)

Coordinators/assistant coaches

- Peter P. Stevens (Temple)
- Don Shank (Penn State)

Legend

- (C) Team captain
- (S) Suspended
- (I) Ineligible
- Injured
- Redshirt
