= 1960 Bucknell Bison football team =

American college football season

1960 Bucknell Bison football

Lambert Cup
- Conference: Middle Atlantic Conference
- University Division
- Record: 7–2 (5–1 MAC)
- Head coach: Bob Odell (3rd season)
- Captain: Clifford Melberger
- Home stadium: Memorial Stadium

1960 Middle Atlantic Conference football standings
	Conf.					Overall
Team	W		L		T	W		L		T
University Division
Rutgers x	4	–	0	–	0	8	–	1	–	0
Bucknell	5	–	1	–	0	7	–	2	–	0
Lehigh	3	–	2	–	0	4	–	5	–	0
Lafayette	4	–	3	–	0	5	–	4	–	0
Gettysburg	2	–	3	–	0	3	–	6	–	0
Delaware	1	–	4	–	0	2	–	6	–	1
Temple	0	–	5	–	0	2	–	7	–	0
Muhlenberg *	1	–	2	–	0	6	–	3	–	0
Northern College Division
Albright x	6	–	0	–	0	9	–	0	–	0
Wagner x	6	–	0	–	0	9	–	0	–	0
Lebanon Valley	6	–	1	–	0	7	–	2	–	0
Susquehanna	5	–	1	–	0	7	–	1	–	0
Juniata	4	–	1	–	0	5	–	2	–	0
Scranton	3	–	3	–	0	4	–	4	–	0
Upsala	1	–	3	–	1	1	–	5	–	2
Wilkes	2	–	7	–	0	2	–	7	–	0
Moravian	1	–	5	–	1	1	–	6	–	1
Hofstra *	2	–	0	–	0	7	–	1	–	1
Lycoming *	1	–	3	–	0	3	–	5	–	0
Southern College Division
Johns Hopkins x	5	–	1	–	0	5	–	2	–	1
Pennsylvania Military	5	–	3	–	0	5	–	4	–	0
Western Maryland	3	–	2	–	0	6	–	3	–	0
Ursinus	3	–	3	–	0	3	–	4	–	0
Swarthmore	2	–	3	–	0	2	–	5	–	0
Dickinson	1	–	6	–	0	1	–	7	–	0
Drexel	0	–	6	–	0	0	–	7	–	1
Haverford	0	–	7	–	0	0	–	7	–	0
Franklin & Marshall *	1	–	2	–	0	2	–	6	–	0
No. 5 West Chester *	0	–	0	–	0	9	–	0	–	0
x – Division champion/co-champions; * – Ineligible for championship due to insufficient conference games; Rankings from AP Poll

The 1960 Bucknell Bison football team was an American football team that represented Bucknell University in the 1960 college football season. Bucknell was awarded the Lambert Cup as the best small-college football team in the East.

In their third year under head coach Bob Odell, the Bison compiled a 7–2 record. Their 5–1 conference record placed second in the University Division of the Middle Atlantic Conference. Clifford Melberger was the team captain.

Bucknell played its home games at Memorial Stadium on the university campus in Lewisburg, Pennsylvania.

== Schedule ==
Date	Opponent	Site	Result	Attendance	Source
September 24	vs. Gettysburg	Hershey Stadium; Hershey, PA (Rotary Bowl)	W 14–7	7,500	
October 1	at Cornell*	Schoellkopf Field; Ithaca, NY	L 7–15	10,000	
October 8	Buffalo*	Memorial Stadium; Lewisburg, PA	W 41–0	8,000–8,500	
October 15	at Rutgers	Rutgers Stadium; Piscataway, NJ	L 19–23	11,000–13,000	
October 22	Lafayette	Memorial Stadium; Lewisburg, PA	W 28–0	10,000	
October 29	Lehigh	Memorial Stadium; Lewisburg, PA	W 18–6	6,000	
November 5	at Colgate*	Colgate Athletic Field; Hamilton, NY	W 12–8	4,000	
November 12	Temple	Memorial Stadium; Lewisburg, PA	W 23–0	5,000	
November 19	at Delaware	Delaware Stadium; Newark, DE	W 26–0	6,000–6,200	
*Non-conference game
