= 1960 Lehigh Engineers football team =

American college football season

1960 Lehigh Engineers football
- Conference: Middle Atlantic Conference
- University Division
- Record: 4–5 (3–2 MAC)
- Head coach: Bill Leckonby (15th season)
- Captain: William Jones
- Home stadium: Taylor Stadium

1960 Middle Atlantic Conference football standings
	Conf.					Overall
Team	W		L		T	W		L		T
University Division
Rutgers x	4	–	0	–	0	8	–	1	–	0
Bucknell	5	–	1	–	0	7	–	2	–	0
Lehigh	3	–	2	–	0	4	–	5	–	0
Lafayette	4	–	3	–	0	5	–	4	–	0
Gettysburg	2	–	3	–	0	3	–	6	–	0
Delaware	1	–	4	–	0	2	–	6	–	1
Temple	0	–	5	–	0	2	–	7	–	0
Muhlenberg *	1	–	2	–	0	6	–	3	–	0
Northern College Division
Albright x	6	–	0	–	0	9	–	0	–	0
Wagner x	6	–	0	–	0	9	–	0	–	0
Lebanon Valley	6	–	1	–	0	7	–	2	–	0
Susquehanna	5	–	1	–	0	7	–	1	–	0
Juniata	4	–	1	–	0	5	–	2	–	0
Scranton	3	–	3	–	0	4	–	4	–	0
Upsala	1	–	3	–	1	1	–	5	–	2
Wilkes	2	–	7	–	0	2	–	7	–	0
Moravian	1	–	5	–	1	1	–	6	–	1
Hofstra *	2	–	0	–	0	7	–	1	–	1
Lycoming *	1	–	3	–	0	3	–	5	–	0
Southern College Division
Johns Hopkins x	5	–	1	–	0	5	–	2	–	1
Pennsylvania Military	5	–	3	–	0	5	–	4	–	0
Western Maryland	3	–	2	–	0	6	–	3	–	0
Ursinus	3	–	3	–	0	3	–	4	–	0
Swarthmore	2	–	3	–	0	2	–	5	–	0
Dickinson	1	–	6	–	0	1	–	7	–	0
Drexel	0	–	6	–	0	0	–	7	–	1
Haverford	0	–	7	–	0	0	–	7	–	0
Franklin & Marshall *	1	–	2	–	0	2	–	6	–	0
No. 5 West Chester *	0	–	0	–	0	9	–	0	–	0
x – Division champion/co-champions; * – Ineligible for championship due to insufficient conference games; Rankings from AP Poll

The 1960 Lehigh Engineers football team was an American football team that represented Lehigh University during the 1960 college football season. Lehigh finished third in the Middle Atlantic Conference, University Division, and second in the Middle Three Conference.

In their 15th year under head coach Bill Leckonby, the Engineers compiled a 4–5 record. William Jones was the team captain.

Lehigh finished third in the MAC University Division with a record of 3–2 against conference opponents. The Engineers went 1–1 against the Middle Three, losing to Rutgers and beating Lafayette.

Opening the season with a three-game winning streak, the Engineers rose to No. 3 in the UPI small college poll before a longer streak of five losses pushed them out of the top 20. They finished the year unranked.

Lehigh played its home games at Taylor Stadium on the university campus in Bethlehem, Pennsylvania.

== Schedule ==
Date	Opponent	Rank	Site	Result	Attendance	Source
September 24	Delaware		Taylor Stadium; Bethlehem, PA (rivalry)	W 27–14	8,500	
October 1	at Colgate*	No. 7	Colgate Athletic Field; Hamilton, NY	W 39–22	6,000	
October 8	Gettysburg	No. 3	Taylor Stadium; Bethlehem, PA	W 52–21	10,000	
October 15	at No. 9 Tufts*	No. 4	Ellis Oval; Somerville, MA	L 0–14	6,000	
October 22	Rutgers	No. 9	Taylor Stadium; Bethlehem, PA	L 0–8	14,000	
October 29	at Bucknell	No. 10	Memorial Stadium; Lewisburg, PA	L 6–18	6,000	
November 5	at VMI*	No. 18	Wilson Field; Lexington, VA	L 14–18	6,000	
November 12	Davidson*		Taylor Stadium; Bethlehem, PA	L 18–21	5,000	
November 19	at Lafayette		Fisher Field; Easton, PA (The Rivalry)	W 26–3	18,000–19,000	
*Non-conference game; Rankings from UPI Poll released prior to the game
