= 1960 Albright Lions football team =

American college football season

1960 Albright Lions football

MAC Northern College Division co-champion
- Conference: Middle Atlantic Conference
- Northern College Division
- Record: 9–0 (6–0 MAC)
- Head coach: John Potsklan (6th season)

1960 Middle Atlantic Conference football standings
	Conf.					Overall
Team	W		L		T	W		L		T
University Division
Rutgers x	4	–	0	–	0	8	–	1	–	0
Bucknell	5	–	1	–	0	7	–	2	–	0
Lehigh	3	–	2	–	0	4	–	5	–	0
Lafayette	4	–	3	–	0	5	–	4	–	0
Gettysburg	2	–	3	–	0	3	–	6	–	0
Delaware	1	–	4	–	0	2	–	6	–	1
Temple	0	–	5	–	0	2	–	7	–	0
Muhlenberg *	1	–	2	–	0	6	–	3	–	0
Northern College Division
Albright x	6	–	0	–	0	9	–	0	–	0
Wagner x	6	–	0	–	0	9	–	0	–	0
Lebanon Valley	6	–	1	–	0	7	–	2	–	0
Susquehanna	5	–	1	–	0	7	–	1	–	0
Juniata	4	–	1	–	0	5	–	2	–	0
Scranton	3	–	3	–	0	4	–	4	–	0
Upsala	1	–	3	–	1	1	–	5	–	2
Wilkes	2	–	7	–	0	2	–	7	–	0
Moravian	1	–	5	–	1	1	–	6	–	1
Hofstra *	2	–	0	–	0	7	–	1	–	1
Lycoming *	1	–	3	–	0	3	–	5	–	0
Southern College Division
Johns Hopkins x	5	–	1	–	0	5	–	2	–	1
Pennsylvania Military	5	–	3	–	0	5	–	4	–	0
Western Maryland	3	–	2	–	0	6	–	3	–	0
Ursinus	3	–	3	–	0	3	–	4	–	0
Swarthmore	2	–	3	–	0	2	–	5	–	0
Dickinson	1	–	6	–	0	1	–	7	–	0
Drexel	0	–	6	–	0	0	–	7	–	1
Haverford	0	–	7	–	0	0	–	7	–	0
Franklin & Marshall *	1	–	2	–	0	2	–	6	–	0
No. 5 West Chester *	0	–	0	–	0	9	–	0	–	0
x – Division champion/co-champions; * – Ineligible for championship due to insufficient conference games; Rankings from AP Poll

The 1960 Albright Lions football team was an American football team that represented Albright College as a member of the Middle Atlantic Conference (MAC) during the 1960 college football season. In their sixth year under head coach John Potsklan, the Lions compiled a perfect 9–0 record (6–0 against MAC opponents), tied for the MAC Northern College Division championship with Wagner, and outscored opponents by a total of 261 to 108. It was the first perfect season in Albright football history.

On offense, the Lions scored 261 points and gained 3,129 yards of total offense (1,987 rushing, 1,092 passing). On defense, they held opponents to 108 points and 1,469 yards of total offense (794 rushing, 675 passing).

The team's statistical leaders included quarterback Gary Chapman with 1,092 passing yards and 243 yards of total offense; halfback Tom Olivo with 542 rushing yards, 455 receiving yards, and 60 points scored; and fullback Mike Matto with 418 rushing yards on 111 carries; and end Claude Lynch with 248 receiving yards and 54 points scored.

== Schedule ==
Date	Opponent	Site	Result	Attendance	Source
September 24	at Muhlenberg	Muhlenberg Field; Allentown, PA	W 31–7	3,500	
October 1	Thiel	Reading, PA	W 41–18	4,000	
October 8	at Drexel	Drexel Field; Philadelphia, PA	W 34–6	1,500	
October 15	Gettysburg	Reading, PA	W 20–8		
October 22	Scranton	Reading, PA	W 39–6	9,000	
October 29	Moravian	Reading, PA	W 21–14		
November 5	Lebanon Valley	Reading, PA	W 7–6		
November 12	at Juniata	Huntingdon, PA	W 27–14	5,000	
November 19	at Franklin & Marshall	Lancaster, PA	W 41–29	6,000	
