= Mickey Sullivan (American football) =

American football player and coach (1916–2000)

Biographical details
- Born: January 10, 1916
- Died: August 28, 2000 (aged 84)

Playing career
- 1937–1939: NC State
- 1940: Jersey City Giants
- 1940–1941: Long Island Indians
- Position: End

Coaching career (HC unless noted)
- 1957–1961: Wagner

Head coaching record
- Overall: 26–16 (college)

Accomplishments and honors

Championships
- 1 MAC College–Northern Division (1960)

J. Walter "Mickey" Sullivan (January 10, 1916 – August 28, 2000) was an American football player and coach. He served as the head football coach at Wagner College in Staten Island, New York from 1957 to 1961, compiling a record of 26–16. Sullivan was drafted by the Pittsburgh Steelers in the 1940 NFL draft. A native of Staten Island, Sullivan coached high school football before he was hired at Wagner in 1957.

== Head coaching record ==
=== College ===
Year	Team	Overall	Conference	Standing	Bowl/playoffs
Wagner Seahawks (Independent) (1957)
1957	Wagner	2–6			
Wagner Seahawks (Middle Atlantic Conference) (1958–1961)
1958	Wagner	3–5	3–3	T–5th (Northern College)	
1959	Wagner	6–2	5–1	T–5th (Northern College)	
1960	Wagner	9–0	6–0	T–5th (Northern College)	
1961	Wagner	6–3	4–2	T–5th (Northern College)	
Wagner:		26–16	18–6		
Total:		26–16			
National championship Conference title Conference division title or championship game berth
