= 1960 Columbia Lions football team =

American college football season

1960 Columbia Lions football
- Conference: Ivy League
- Record: 3–6 (3–4 Ivy)
- Head coach: Aldo Donelli (4th season)
- Captain: Robert McCool
- Home stadium: Baker Field

1960 Ivy League football standings
	Conf.					Overall
Team	W		L		T	W		L		T
No. 14 Yale $	7	–	0	–	0	9	–	0	–	0
Princeton	6	–	1	–	0	7	–	2	–	0
Dartmouth	4	–	3	–	0	5	–	4	–	0
Harvard	4	–	3	–	0	5	–	4	–	0
Columbia	3	–	4	–	0	3	–	6	–	0
Penn	2	–	5	–	0	3	–	6	–	0
Brown	1	–	6	–	0	3	–	6	–	0
Cornell	1	–	6	–	0	2	–	7	–	0
$ – Conference champion; Rankings from AP poll

The 1960 Columbia Lions football team was an American football team that represented Columbia University during the 1960 college football season. Columbia finished fifth in the Ivy League.

In their fourth season under head coach Aldo "Buff" Donelli, the Lions compiled a 3–6 record and were outscored 191 to 126. Robert McCool was the team captain.

The Lions' 3–4 conference record placed fifth in the Ivy League. Columbia was outscored 121 to 118 by Ivy opponents.

Columbia played its home games at Baker Field in Upper Manhattan, in New York City.

== Schedule ==
Date	Opponent	Site	Result	Attendance	Source
September 24	Brown	Baker Field; New York, NY	W 37–0	12,000	
October 1	at Princeton	Palmer Stadium; Princeton, NJ	L 0–49	18,000	
October 8	at Yale	Yale Bowl; New Haven, CT	L 8–30	16,679	
October 15	Harvard^{†}	Baker Field; New York, NY	L 7–8	21,899	
October 22	Holy Cross*	Baker Field; New York, NY	L 6–27	10,414	
October 29	Cornell	Baker Field; New York, NY (rivalry)	W 44–6	9,000	
November 5	at Dartmouth	Memorial Field; Hanover, NH	L 6–22	9,100	
November 12	at Penn	Franklin Field; Philadelphia, PA	W 16–6	15,841	
November 19	Rutgers*	Baker Field; New York, NY	L 2–43	16,677	
*Non-conference game; ^{†}Homecoming
