= 1960 Cornell Big Red football team =

American college football season

1960 Cornell Big Red football
- Conference: Ivy League
- Record: 2–7 (1–6 Ivy)
- Head coach: George K. James (14th season)
- Captain: Warren Sundstrom
- Home stadium: Schoellkopf Field

1960 Ivy League football standings
	Conf.					Overall
Team	W		L		T	W		L		T
No. 14 Yale $	7	–	0	–	0	9	–	0	–	0
Princeton	6	–	1	–	0	7	–	2	–	0
Dartmouth	4	–	3	–	0	5	–	4	–	0
Harvard	4	–	3	–	0	5	–	4	–	0
Columbia	3	–	4	–	0	3	–	6	–	0
Penn	2	–	5	–	0	3	–	6	–	0
Brown	1	–	6	–	0	3	–	6	–	0
Cornell	1	–	6	–	0	2	–	7	–	0
$ – Conference champion; Rankings from AP poll

The 1960 Cornell Big Red football team was an American football team that represented Cornell University during the 1960 college football season. Cornell tied for last place in the Ivy League .

In its 14th and final season under head coach George K. James, the team compiled a 2–7 record and was outscored 167 to 78. Warren Sundstrom was the team captain.

Cornell's 1–6 conference record tied for seventh place in the Ivy League. The Big Red were outscored 132 to 55 by Ivy opponents.

Cornell played its home games at Schoellkopf Field in Ithaca, New York.

== Schedule ==
Date	Opponent	Site	Result	Attendance	Source
September 24	Colgate*	Schoellkopf Field; Ithaca, NY (rivalry)	L 8–28	12,000	
October 1	Bucknell*	Schoellkopf Field; Ithaca, NY	W 15–7	10,000	
October 8	Harvard	Schoellkopf Field; Ithaca, NY	W 12–0	15,000	
October 15	at Yale	Yale Bowl; New Haven, CT	L 6–22	24,713	
October 22	Princeton	Schoellkopf Field; Ithaca, NY	L 18–21	18,000	
October 29	at Columbia	Baker Field; New York, NY (rivalry)	L 6–44	9,000	
November 5	at Brown	Brown Stadium; Providence, RI	L 6–7	7,500	
November 12	Dartmouth	Schoellkopf Field; Ithaca, NY (rivalry)	L 0–20	12,000	
November 24	at Penn	Franklin Field; Philadelphia, PA (rivalry)	L 7–18	14,413	
*Non-conference game
