= 1960 Rhode Island Rams football team =

American college football season

1960 Rhode Island Rams football
- Conference: Yankee Conference
- Record: 3–5 (1–4 Yankee)
- Head coach: Herb Maack (5th season)
- Home stadium: Meade Stadium

1960 Yankee Conference football standings
	Conf.					Overall
Team	W		L		T	W		L		T
Connecticut +	3	–	1	–	0	5	–	4	–	0
UMass +	3	–	1	–	0	7	–	2	–	0
Maine	3	–	2	–	0	4	–	3	–	1
New Hampshire	2	–	2	–	0	4	–	3	–	0
Rhode Island	1	–	4	–	0	3	–	5	–	0
Vermont	0	–	2	–	0	1	–	6	–	0
+ – Conference co-champions

The 1960 Rhode Island Rams football team was an American football team that represented the University of Rhode Island as a member of the Yankee Conference during the 1960 college football season. In its fifth and final season under head coach Herb Maack, the team compiled a 3–5 record (1–4 against conference opponents), finished in fifth place out of six teams in the Yankee Conference, and was outscored by a total of 150 to 132. The team played its home games at Meade Stadium in Kingston, Rhode Island.

== Schedule ==
Date	Opponent	Site	Result	Attendance	Source
September 17	Northeastern*	Meade Stadium; Kingston, RI	W 20–0	3,500	
September 24	at Maine	Alumni Field; Orono, ME	L 0–7	4,800	
October 1	at New Hampshire	Cowell Stadium; Durham, NH	L 6–13	3,800–4,000	
October 8	Vermont	Meade Stadium; Kingtson, RI	W 48–8	2,500	
October 15	UMass	Meade Stadium; Kingston, RI	L 16–34	5,000–6,000	
October 22	at Brown*	Brown Stadium; Providence, RI (rivalry)	L 14–36	10,000	
October 29	at Springfield*	Springfield, MA	W 22–10	5,000	
November 12	at Connecticut	Memorial Stadium; Storrs, CT (rivalry)	L 6–42	12,000–12,194	
*Non-conference game
