= 1960 Vermont Catamounts football team =

American college football season

1960 Vermont Catamounts football
- Conference: Yankee Conference
- Record: 1–6 (0–2 Yankee)
- Head coach: J. Edward Donnelly (9th season)
- Home stadium: Centennial Field

1960 Yankee Conference football standings
	Conf.					Overall
Team	W		L		T	W		L		T
Connecticut +	3	–	1	–	0	5	–	4	–	0
UMass +	3	–	1	–	0	7	–	2	–	0
Maine	3	–	2	–	0	4	–	3	–	1
New Hampshire	2	–	2	–	0	4	–	3	–	0
Rhode Island	1	–	4	–	0	3	–	5	–	0
Vermont	0	–	2	–	0	1	–	6	–	0
+ – Conference co-champions

The 1960 Vermont Catamounts football team was an American football team that represented the University of Vermont in the Yankee Conference during the 1960 college football season. In their ninth year under head coach J. Edward Donnelly, the team compiled a 1–6 record.

== Schedule ==
Date	Opponent	Site	Result	Attendance	Source
September 24	at Coast Guard*	Cadet Memorial Field; New London, CT	L 0–25		
October 1	Maine	Centennial Field; Burlington, VT	L 0–27	5,000–5,400	
October 8	at Rhode Island	Meade Stadium; Kingston, RI	L 8–48	2,500	
October 15	at Rochester*	Fauver Stadium; Rochester, NY	L 8–20	5,500	
October 22	at Norwich*	Sabine Field; Northfield, VT	W 8–0		
October 29	Northeastern*	Centennial Field; Burlington, VT	L 8–22	6,500	
November 5	Middlebury*	Centennial Field; Burlington, VT	L 6–28	6,300	
*Non-conference game
