= 1960 Dartmouth Indians football team =

American college football season

1960 Dartmouth Indians football
- Conference: Ivy League
- Record: 5–4 (4–3 Ivy)
- Head coach: Bob Blackman (6th season)
- Captain: Kenneth DeHaven
- Home stadium: Memorial Field

1960 Ivy League football standings
	Conf.					Overall
Team	W		L		T	W		L		T
No. 14 Yale $	7	–	0	–	0	9	–	0	–	0
Princeton	6	–	1	–	0	7	–	2	–	0
Dartmouth	4	–	3	–	0	5	–	4	–	0
Harvard	4	–	3	–	0	5	–	4	–	0
Columbia	3	–	4	–	0	3	–	6	–	0
Penn	2	–	5	–	0	3	–	6	–	0
Brown	1	–	6	–	0	3	–	6	–	0
Cornell	1	–	6	–	0	2	–	7	–	0
$ – Conference champion; Rankings from AP poll

The 1960 Dartmouth Indians football team was an American football team that represented Dartmouth College during the 1960 college football season. Dartmouth tied for third in the Ivy League.

In their sixth season under head coach Bob Blackman, the Indians compiled a 5–4 record and outscored opponents 98 to 66. Kenneth DeHaven was the team captain.

The Indians' 4–3 conference record tied for third-best in the Ivy League standings. They outscored Ivy opponents 83 to 51.

Dartmouth played its home games at Memorial Field on the college campus in Hanover, New Hampshire.

== Schedule ==
Date	Opponent	Site	Result	Attendance	Source
September 24	New Hampshire*	Memorial Field; Hanover, NH (rivalry)	W 7–6	6,500–9,000	
October 1	Penn	Memorial Field; Hanover, NH	W 15–0	10,000	
October 8	at Brown	Brown Stadium; Providence, RI	W 20–0	1,000	
October 15	Holy Cross*	Memorial Field; Hanover, NH	L 8–9	12,500	
October 22	at Harvard	Harvard Stadium; Boston, MA (rivalry)	L 6–9	30,000	
October 29	at Yale	Yale Bowl; New Haven, CT	L 0–29	40,770	
November 5	Columbia	Memorial Field; Hanover, NH	W 22–6	9,100	
November 12	at Cornell	Schoellkopf Field; Ithaca, NY (rivalry)	W 20–0	12,000	
November 19	at Princeton	Palmer Stadium; Princeton, NJ	L 0–7	32,000	
*Non-conference game
