= 1960 Brown Bears football team =

American college football season

1960 Brown Bears football
- Conference: Ivy League
- Record: 3–6 (1–6 Ivy)
- Head coach: John McLaughry (2nd season)
- Captain: W. Packer
- Home stadium: Brown Stadium

1960 Ivy League football standings
	Conf.					Overall
Team	W		L		T	W		L		T
No. 14 Yale $	7	–	0	–	0	9	–	0	–	0
Princeton	6	–	1	–	0	7	–	2	–	0
Dartmouth	4	–	3	–	0	5	–	4	–	0
Harvard	4	–	3	–	0	5	–	4	–	0
Columbia	3	–	4	–	0	3	–	6	–	0
Penn	2	–	5	–	0	3	–	6	–	0
Brown	1	–	6	–	0	3	–	6	–	0
Cornell	1	–	6	–	0	2	–	7	–	0
$ – Conference champion; Rankings from AP poll

The 1960 Brown Bears football team was an American football team that represented Brown University during the 1960 college football season. Brown tied for last place in the Ivy League.

In their second season under head coach John McLaughry, the Bears compiled a 3–6 record and were outscored 212 to 100. W. Packer was the team captain.

The Bears' 1–6 conference record tied for seventh in the Ivy League. They were outscored by Ivy opponents 184 to 45.

Brown played its home games at Brown Stadium in Providence, Rhode Island.

== Schedule ==
Date	Opponent	Site	Result	Attendance	Source
September 24	at Columbia	Baker Field; New York, NY	L 0–37	12,000	
October 1	at Yale	Yale Bowl; New Haven, CT	L 0–9	21,859	
October 8	Dartmouth	Brown Stadium; Providence, RI	L 0–20	1,000	
October 15	at Penn	Franklin Field; Philadelphia, PA	L 7–36	10,875	
October 22	Rhode Island*	Brown Stadium; Providence, RI (rivalry)	W 36–14	10,000	
October 29	at Princeton	Palmer Stadium; Princeton, NJ	L 21–54	12,000	
November 5	Cornell	Brown Stadium; Providence, RI	W 7–6	7,500	
November 12	at Harvard	Harvard Stadium; Boston, MA	L 8–22	15,000	
November 19	Colgate*	Brown Stadium; Providence, RI	W 21–14	10,000	
*Non-conference game
