= 1960 Yale Bulldogs football team =

American college football season

1960 Yale Bulldogs football

Eastern co-champion Ivy League champion
- Conference: Ivy League

Ranking
- Coaches: No. 18
- AP: No. 14
- Record: 9–0 (7–0 Ivy)
- Head coach: Jordan Olivar (9th season)
- Captain: Mike Pyle
- Home stadium: Yale Bowl

1960 Ivy League football standings
	Conf.					Overall
Team	W		L		T	W		L		T
No. 14 Yale $	7	–	0	–	0	9	–	0	–	0
Princeton	6	–	1	–	0	7	–	2	–	0
Dartmouth	4	–	3	–	0	5	–	4	–	0
Harvard	4	–	3	–	0	5	–	4	–	0
Columbia	3	–	4	–	0	3	–	6	–	0
Penn	2	–	5	–	0	3	–	6	–	0
Brown	1	–	6	–	0	3	–	6	–	0
Cornell	1	–	6	–	0	2	–	7	–	0
$ – Conference champion; Rankings from AP poll

The 1960 Yale Bulldogs football team represented Yale University in the 1960 college football season. The Bulldogs were led by ninth-year head coach Jordan Olivar, and played their home games at the Yale Bowl in New Haven, Connecticut. They finished with a perfect record, 9–0, to win the Ivy League and a share of the Lambert-Meadowlands Trophy, which signified them as co-champions of the East (along with Navy).

== Schedule ==
Date	Opponent	Rank	Site	Result	Attendance	Source
September 24	Connecticut*		Yale Bowl; New Haven, CT	W 11–8	22,678	
October 1	Brown		Yale Bowl; New Haven, CT	W 9–0	21,859	
October 8	Columbia		Yale Bowl; New Haven, CT	W 30–8	16,679	
October 15	Cornell		Yale Bowl; New Haven, CT	W 22–6	24,713	
October 22	Colgate*		Yale Bowl; New Haven, CT	W 36–14	31,193	
October 29	Dartmouth		Yale Bowl; New Haven, CT	W 29–0	40,770	
November 5	Penn		Yale Bowl; New Haven, CT	W 34–9	22,752	
November 12	Princeton	No. 17	Yale Bowl; New Haven, CT (rivalry)	W 43–22	62,528	
November 19	at Harvard	No. 14	Harvard Stadium; Boston, MA (The Game)	W 39–6	40,000	
*Non-conference game; Rankings from AP Poll released prior to the game

== NFL draft ==
The following Bulldogs were selected in the National Football League draft following the season.

Round	Pick	Player	Position	NFL team
6	84	Ben Balme	G	Philadelphia Eagles
7	89	Mike Pyle	C	Chicago Bears
