= 1960 New Hampshire Wildcats football team =

American college football season

1960 New Hampshire Wildcats football
- Conference: Yankee Conference
- Record: 4–3 (2–2 Yankee)
- Head coach: Chief Boston (12th season)
- Home stadium: Cowell Stadium

1960 Yankee Conference football standings
	Conf.					Overall
Team	W		L		T	W		L		T
Connecticut +	3	–	1	–	0	5	–	4	–	0
UMass +	3	–	1	–	0	7	–	2	–	0
Maine	3	–	2	–	0	4	–	3	–	1
New Hampshire	2	–	2	–	0	4	–	3	–	0
Rhode Island	1	–	4	–	0	3	–	5	–	0
Vermont	0	–	2	–	0	1	–	6	–	0
+ – Conference co-champions

The 1960 New Hampshire Wildcats football team was an American football team that represented the University of New Hampshire as a member of the Yankee Conference during the 1960 college football season. In its 12th year under head coach Chief Boston, the team compiled a 4–3 record (2–2 against conference opponents) and finished fourth out of six teams in the Yankee Conference.

== Schedule ==
Date	Opponent	Site	Result	Attendance	Source
September 24	at Dartmouth*	Memorial Field; Hanover, NH (rivalry)	L 6–7	6,500–9,000	
October 1	Rhode Island	Cowell Stadium; Durham, NH	W 13–6	3,800–4,000	
October 8	at Maine	Alumni Field; Orono, ME (Battle for the Brice–Cowell Musket)	L 7–13	6,900	
October 15	Delaware*	Cowell Stadium; Durham, NH	W 31–14	6,900–7,000	
October 29	Connecticut	Cowell Stadium; Durham, NH	W 17–9	6,200	
November 5	Springfield*	Cowell Stadium; Durham, NH	W 28–6	4,500	
November 12	at UMass	Alumni Field; Amherst, MA (rivalry)	L 15–35	7,000–7,500	
*Non-conference game
