= 1960 UMass Redmen football team =

American college football season

1960 UMass Redmen football

Yankee Conference co-champion
- Conference: Yankee Conference
- Record: 7–2 (3–1 Yankee)
- Head coach: Chuck Studley (1st season)
- Home stadium: Alumni Field

1960 Yankee Conference football standings
	Conf.					Overall
Team	W		L		T	W		L		T
Connecticut +	3	–	1	–	0	5	–	4	–	0
UMass +	3	–	1	–	0	7	–	2	–	0
Maine	3	–	2	–	0	4	–	3	–	1
New Hampshire	2	–	2	–	0	4	–	3	–	0
Rhode Island	1	–	4	–	0	3	–	5	–	0
Vermont	0	–	2	–	0	1	–	6	–	0
+ – Conference co-champions

The 1960 UMass Redmen football team represented the University of Massachusetts Amherst in the 1960 college football season as a member of the Yankee Conference. The team was coached by Chuck Studley and played its home games at Alumni Field in Amherst, Massachusetts. The 1960 season was Studley's first and only as coach of the Minutemen. It was also the team's first as conference champions. UMass finished the season with a record of 7–2 overall and 3–1 in conference play.

== Schedule ==
Date	Opponent	Site	Result	Attendance	Source
September 17	vs. Maine	Portland Stadium; Portland, ME	W 21–13	7,500–8,500	
September 24	American International*	Alumni Field; Amherst, MA	W 7–6	6,000	
October 1	at Harvard*	Harvard Stadium; Boston, MA	W 27–12	10,500	
October 8	Connecticut	Alumni Field; Amherst, MA (rivalry)	L 0–31	10,500–11,000	
October 15	at Rhode Island	Meade Stadium; Kingston, RI	W 34–16	5,000–6,000	
October 22	Northeastern*	Alumni Field; Amherst, MA	W 7–0	6,000	
October 29	at Boston University*	Nickerson Field; Boston, MA	L 7–20	10,500	
November 12	New Hampshire	Alumni Field; Amherst, MA (rivalry)	W 35–15	7,000–7,500	
November 19	at Springfield*	Pratt Field; Springfield, MA	W 35–8		
*Non-conference game
