= Brown-Moore Blacksmith Shop =

- U.S. National Register of Historic Places
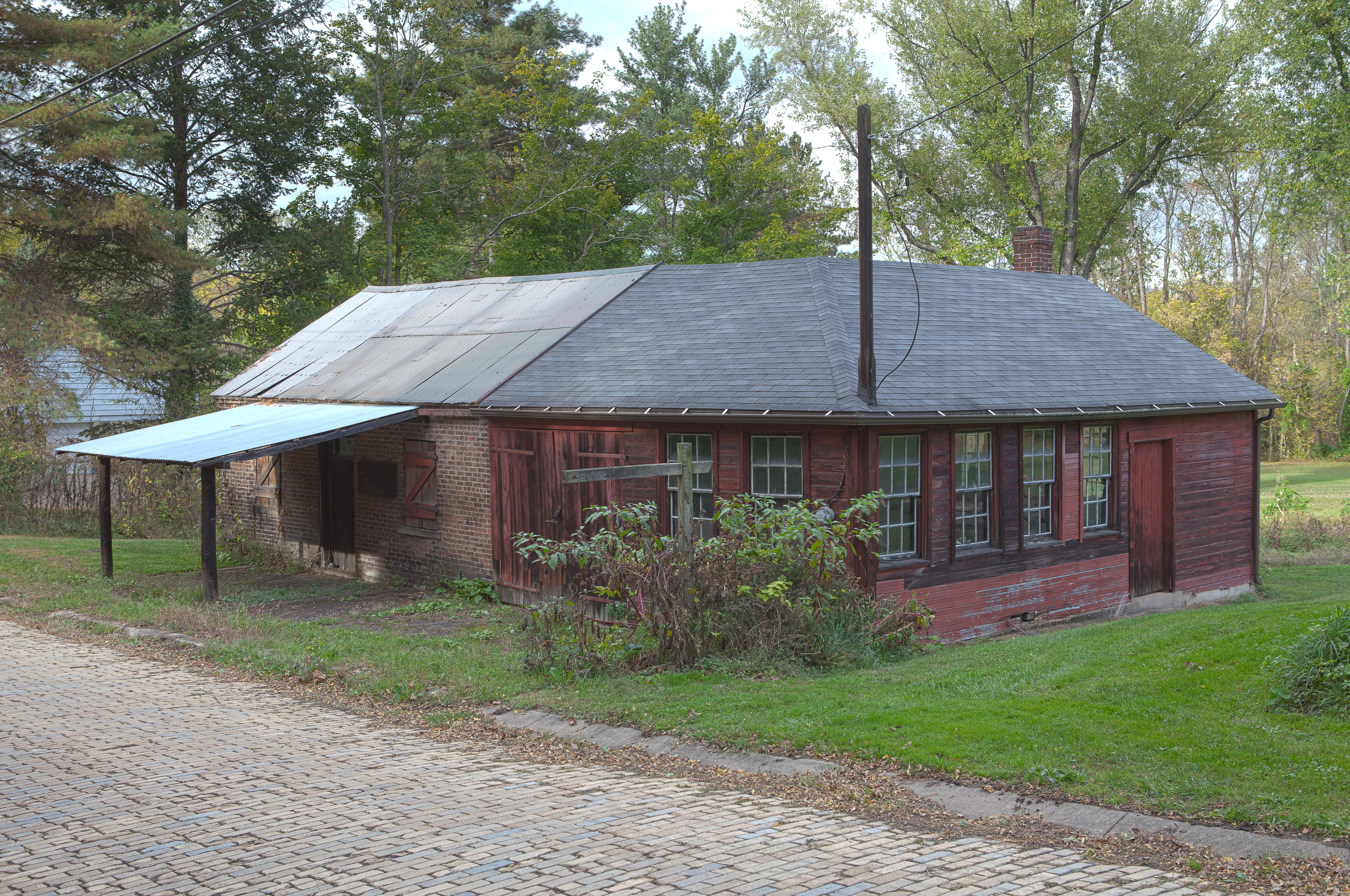
- Brown-Moore Blacksmith Shop, October 2013

- Location within Pennsylvania Location within the United States
- Location: 0.1 miles (0.16 km) west of Pennsylvania Route 4020, Luzerne Township, Pennsylvania
- Coordinates: 39°58′22″N 79°53′13″W
- Area: 0.1 acres (0.040 ha)
- Built: 1822
- NRHP reference No.: 92000393
- Added to NRHP: May 7, 1992

Brown-Moore Blacksmith Shop is a historic blacksmith shop located at Luzerne Township, Fayette County, Pennsylvania. The shop began operation in 1822, and remained open until 1939. It is a rectangular brick building with a corrugated metal roof. It has a rectangular wood frame wagon shop addition rebuilt in 1919 after a fire. The shop has two large stone, hand-operated forges.

It was added to the National Register of Historic Places in 1992.
