= 1960 Rutgers Scarlet Knights football team =

American college football season

1960 Rutgers Scarlet Knights football

Middle Three champion
- Conference: Middle Three Conference
- Record: 8–1 (4–0 Middle Three)
- Head coach: John F. Bateman (1st season)
- Home stadium: Rutgers Stadium

1960 Middle Atlantic Conference football standings
	Conf.					Overall
Team	W		L		T	W		L		T
University Division
Rutgers x	4	–	0	–	0	8	–	1	–	0
Bucknell	5	–	1	–	0	7	–	2	–	0
Lehigh	3	–	2	–	0	4	–	5	–	0
Lafayette	4	–	3	–	0	5	–	4	–	0
Gettysburg	2	–	3	–	0	3	–	6	–	0
Delaware	1	–	4	–	0	2	–	6	–	1
Temple	0	–	5	–	0	2	–	7	–	0
Muhlenberg *	1	–	2	–	0	6	–	3	–	0
Northern College Division
Albright x	6	–	0	–	0	9	–	0	–	0
Wagner x	6	–	0	–	0	9	–	0	–	0
Lebanon Valley	6	–	1	–	0	7	–	2	–	0
Susquehanna	5	–	1	–	0	7	–	1	–	0
Juniata	4	–	1	–	0	5	–	2	–	0
Scranton	3	–	3	–	0	4	–	4	–	0
Upsala	1	–	3	–	1	1	–	5	–	2
Wilkes	2	–	7	–	0	2	–	7	–	0
Moravian	1	–	5	–	1	1	–	6	–	1
Hofstra *	2	–	0	–	0	7	–	1	–	1
Lycoming *	1	–	3	–	0	3	–	5	–	0
Southern College Division
Johns Hopkins x	5	–	1	–	0	5	–	2	–	1
Pennsylvania Military	5	–	3	–	0	5	–	4	–	0
Western Maryland	3	–	2	–	0	6	–	3	–	0
Ursinus	3	–	3	–	0	3	–	4	–	0
Swarthmore	2	–	3	–	0	2	–	5	–	0
Dickinson	1	–	6	–	0	1	–	7	–	0
Drexel	0	–	6	–	0	0	–	7	–	1
Haverford	0	–	7	–	0	0	–	7	–	0
Franklin & Marshall *	1	–	2	–	0	2	–	6	–	0
No. 5 West Chester *	0	–	0	–	0	9	–	0	–	0
x – Division champion/co-champions; * – Ineligible for championship due to insufficient conference games; Rankings from AP Poll

The 1960 Rutgers Scarlet Knights football team was an American football team that represented Rutgers University as a member of the Middle Three Conference during the 1960 college football season. In their first season under head coach John F. Bateman, the Scarlet Knights compiled an 8–1 record, won the Middle Three Conference championship, and outscored their opponents by a total of 225 to 69.

The Scarlet Knights tallied an average of 212.9 rushing yards and 88.3 passing yards per game. On defense, they held opponents to an average of 146.8 rushing yards and 85.1 passing yards per game. The team's individual statistical leaders included:

- Passing. Quarterback Sam Mudie completed 34 of 77 passes (44.2%) for 452 yards, four touchdowns, and nine interceptions. Mudie also tallied 177 rushing yards. Bill Speranza completed 20 of 36 (55.6%0 for 261 yards, two touchdowns, and three interceptions.
- Rushing. Steve Simms led the team's rushing attack with 613 yards on 102 carries (6.0-yard average) and five touchdowns. Bill Thompson and Pierce Frauenheim ranked second and third, respectively, with 272 and 202 rushing yards.
- Receiving. Arnie Byrd was the team's leading receiver with 18 catches for 269 yards and three touchdowns. Marv Engle ranked second with eight receptions for 145 yards.

The team played its home games at Rutgers Stadium in Piscataway, New Jersey.

== Schedule ==
Date	Opponent	Site	Result	Attendance	Source
September 24	at Princeton*	Palmer Stadium; Princeton, NJ (rivalry)	W 13–9	30,000	
October 1	at Connecticut*	Memorial Stadium; Storrs, CT	W 19–6	8,888	
October 8	Colgate^{†}*	Rutgers Stadium; Piscataway, NJ	W 49–12	15,000	
October 15	Bucknell	Rutgers Stadium; Piscataway, NJ	W 23–19	11,000–13,000	
October 22	at Lehigh	Taylor Stadium; Behtlehem, PA	W 8–0	14,000	
October 29	Villanova*	Rutgers Stadium; Piscataway, NJ	L 12–14	11,000	
November 5	Lafayette	Rutgers Stadium; Piscataway, NJ	W 36–8	13,500	
November 12	at Delaware	Delaware Stadium; Newark, DE	W 22–0	7,500	
November 19	at Columbia*	Baker Field; New York, NY	W 43–2	16,677	
*Non-conference game; ^{†}Homecoming
