= 1960 Maine Black Bears football team =

American college football season

1960 Maine Black Bears football
- Conference: Yankee Conference, Maine Intercollegiate Athletic Association
- Record: 4–3–1 (3–2 Yankee, 1–1–1 MIAA)
- Head coach: Harold Westerman (10th season)
- Captains: Ewen MacKinnon; Wayne Champeon; Richard Leadbetter
- Home stadium: Alumni Field

1960 Yankee Conference football standings
	Conf.					Overall
Team	W		L		T	W		L		T
Connecticut +	3	–	1	–	0	5	–	4	–	0
UMass +	3	–	1	–	0	7	–	2	–	0
Maine	3	–	2	–	0	4	–	3	–	1
New Hampshire	2	–	2	–	0	4	–	3	–	0
Rhode Island	1	–	4	–	0	3	–	5	–	0
Vermont	0	–	2	–	0	1	–	6	–	0
+ – Conference co-champions

The 1960 Maine Black Bears football team was an American football team that represented the University of Maine as a member of the Yankee Conference and Maine Intercollegiate Athletic Association during the 1960 college football season. In its 10th season under head coach Harold Westerman, the team compiled a 4–3–1 record (3–2 against Yankee Conference and 1–1–1 against MIAA opponents) and finished third out of the six teams in the Yankee Conference. The team played its home games at Alumni Field in Orono, Maine. Ewen MacKinnon, Wayne Champeon, and Richard Leadbetter were the team captains.

The team's statistical leaders included halfback Wayne Champeon with 244 rushing yards, 165 receiving yards, and 32 points scored (five touchdowns and one two-point conversion); and quarterback Manchester Wheeler with 449 passing yards.

== Schedule ==
Date	Opponent	Site	Result	Attendance	Source
September 17	vs. UMass	Portland Stadium; Portland, ME	L 13–21	7,500–8,500	
September 24	Rhode Island	Alumni Field; Orono, ME	W 7–0	4,800	
October 1	at Vermont	Centennial Field; Burlington, VT	W 27–0	5,000–5,400	
October 8	New Hampshire	Alumni Field; Orono, ME (rivalry)	W 13–7	6,900	
October 15	at Connecticut	Memorial Stadium; Storrs, CT	L 2–30	11,500–11,539	
October 22	Bates	Alumni Field; Orono, ME	T 13–13	7,460	
October 29	Colby	Alumni Field; Orono, ME	W 28–12	7,500	
November 5	at Bowdoin	Whittier Field; Brunswick, ME	L 21–28	8,100	
