= Luzerne Township, Pennsylvania =

Township in Pennsylvania, US

Coordinates: 39°57′02″N 79°55′29″W

Luzerne Township
- Township
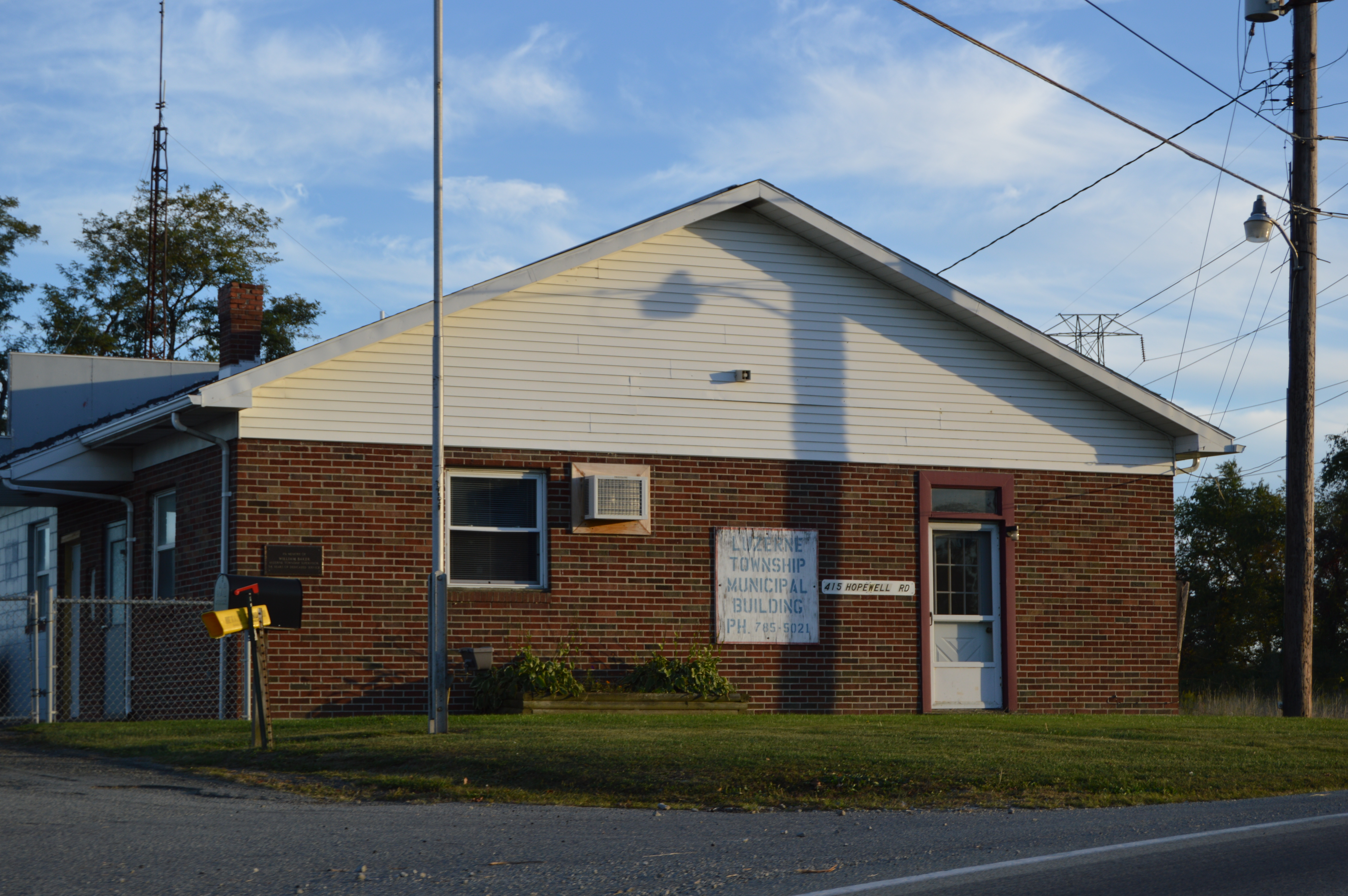
- Township municipal building

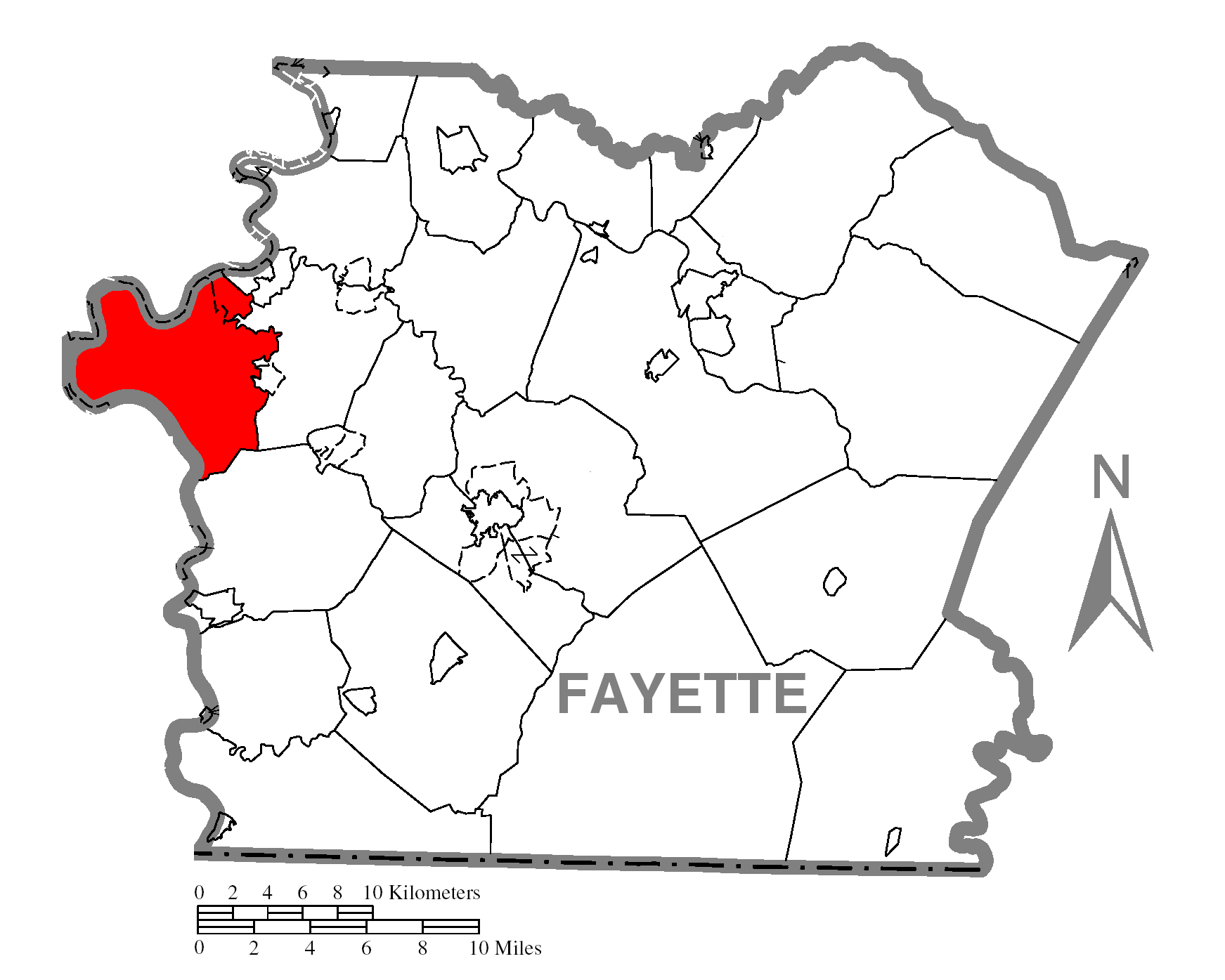
- Location of Luzerne Township in Fayette County

- Location of Fayette County in Pennsylvania
- Country: United States
- State: Pennsylvania
- County: Fayette

Area
  - Total: 30.74 sq mi (79.61 km^{2})
  - Land: 29.53 sq mi (76.49 km^{2})
  - Water: 1.20 sq mi (3.12 km^{2})

Population (2020)
  - Total: 5,685 ▼
  - Estimate (2022): 5,365
  - Density: 199.1/sq mi (76.89/km^{2})
- Time zone: UTC-4 (EST)
  - Summer (DST): UTC-5 (EDT)
- Area code: 724
- FIPS code: 42-051-45560
- Website: https://luzernetownship.com/

Luzerne Township is a township in Fayette County, Pennsylvania, United States. The population was 5,585 at the 2020 census, down from 5,965 at the 2010 census.

The unincorporated communities of East Millsboro, La Belle, Hiller, Isabella, Luzerne, Dutch Hill, Maxwell, Allison, Alicia, East Fredericktown and Penncraft are located within the township. La Belle, Luzerne, Dutch Hill, Maxwell and East Fredericktown are served by the post office in La Belle and thus have the same ZIP code (15450), as does SCI Fayette, a Pennsylvania state prison located next to East Fredericktown.

== History ==
The Penn-Craft Historic District and Brown-Moore Blacksmith Shop are listed on the National Register of Historic Places.

== Geography ==
Luzerne Township is located along the western edge of Fayette County and is bordered to the west by the Monongahela River, which forms the border with Greene and Washington counties. The westernmost point in Fayette County is in Luzerne Township along the Monongahela south of East Millsboro. Dunlap Creek forms the eastern border of the township, flowing north towards the Monongahela at Brownsville, which borders the northeast corner of Luzerne Township.

According to the United States Census Bureau, the township has a total area of 30.7 square miles (79.6 km^{2}), of which 29.5 square miles (76.5 km^{2}) is land and 1.2 square miles (3.1 km^{2}), or 3.92%, is water.

The Mon–Fayette Expressway crosses the northern part of the township, with access from Exit 26 south of Hiller.

== Demographics ==
Historical population
| Census | Pop. | Note | %± |
|---|---|---|---|
| 2010 | 5,965 | | — |
| 2020 | 5,585 | | −6.4% |
| 2022 (est.) | 5,365 | | −3.9% |
U.S. Decennial Census

As of the 2010 census, the population was 5,956 people, with 1,726 households and 1,163 families.

As of the 2000 census, there were 4,683 people, 1,897 households and 1,341 families residing in the township. The population density was 158.3 inhabitants per square mile (61.1/km^{2}). There were 2,043 housing units at an average density of 69.0 per square mile (26.6/km^{2}). The racial makeup of the township was 94.85% White, 3.76% African American, 0.11% Native American, 0.11% Asian, 0.02% from other races, and 1.15% from two or more races. Hispanic or Latino of any race were 0.32% of the population.

There were 1,897 households, out of which 26.2% had children under the age of 18 living with them, 53.8% were married couples living together, 12.1% had a female householder with no husband present, and 29.3% were non-families. 26.7% of all households were made up of individuals, and 16.4% had someone living alone who was 65 years of age or older. The average household size was 2.46 and the average family size was 2.96.

In the township the population was spread out, with 21.1% under the age of 18, 8.1% from 18 to 24, 26.2% from 25 to 44, 24.3% from 45 to 64, and 20.3% who were 65 years of age or older. The median age was 42 years. For every 100 females, there were 90.8 males. For every 100 females age 18 and over, there were 85.9 males.

The median income for a household in the township was $26,510, and the median income for a family was $35,149. Males had a median income of $30,613 versus $19,890 for females. The per capita income for the township was $18,797. About 9.1% of families and 17.5% of the population were below the poverty line, including 26.0% of those under age 18 and 17.7% of those age 65 or over.
