= 1960 Harvard Crimson football team =

American college football season

1960 Harvard Crimson football
- Conference: Ivy League
- Record: 5–4 (4–3 Ivy)
- Head coach: John Yovicsin (4th season)
- Captain: Terry F. Lenzner
- Home stadium: Harvard Stadium

1960 Ivy League football standings
	Conf.					Overall
Team	W		L		T	W		L		T
No. 14 Yale $	7	–	0	–	0	9	–	0	–	0
Princeton	6	–	1	–	0	7	–	2	–	0
Dartmouth	4	–	3	–	0	5	–	4	–	0
Harvard	4	–	3	–	0	5	–	4	–	0
Columbia	3	–	4	–	0	3	–	6	–	0
Penn	2	–	5	–	0	3	–	6	–	0
Brown	1	–	6	–	0	3	–	6	–	0
Cornell	1	–	6	–	0	2	–	7	–	0
$ – Conference champion; Rankings from AP poll

The 1960 Harvard Crimson football team was an American football team that represented Harvard University during the 1960 college football season. Harvard tied for third in the Ivy League.

In their fourth year under head coach John Yovicsin, the Crimson compiled a 5–4 record but were outscored 119 to 90. Terry F. Lenzner was the team captain.

Harvard's 4–3 conference record tied for third-best in the Ivy League standings. The Crimson were outscored 86 to 65 by Ivy opponents.

Harvard played its home games at Harvard Stadium in the Allston neighborhood of Boston, Massachusetts.

== Schedule ==
Date	Opponent	Site	Result	Attendance	Source
September 24	Holy Cross*	Harvard Stadium; Boston, MA	W 13–6	18,000	
October 1	Massachusetts*	Harvard Stadium; Boston, MA	L 12–27	10,500	
October 8	at Cornell	Schoellkopf Field; Ithaca, NY	L 0–12	15,000	
October 15	at Columbia	Baker Field; New York, NY	W 8–7	21,899	
October 22	Dartmouth	Harvard Stadium; Boston, MA (rivalry)	W 9–6	30,000	
October 29	Penn	Harvard Stadium; Boston, MA (rivalry)	W 8–0	11,000	
November 5	at Princeton	Palmer Stadium; Princeton, NJ (rivalry)	L 12–14	36,000	
November 12	Brown	Harvard Stadium; Boston, MA	W 22–8	15,000	
November 19	No. 17 Yale	Harvard Stadium; Boston, MA (The Game)	L 6–39	40,000	
*Non-conference game; Rankings from AP Poll released prior to the game
