= 1960 Penn Quakers football team =

American college football season

1960 Penn Quakers football
- Conference: Ivy League
- Record: 3–6 (2–5 Ivy)
- Head coach: John Stiegman (1st season)
- Captain: George Koval
- Home stadium: Franklin Field

1960 Ivy League football standings
	Conf.					Overall
Team	W		L		T	W		L		T
No. 14 Yale $	7	–	0	–	0	9	–	0	–	0
Princeton	6	–	1	–	0	7	–	2	–	0
Dartmouth	4	–	3	–	0	5	–	4	–	0
Harvard	4	–	3	–	0	5	–	4	–	0
Columbia	3	–	4	–	0	3	–	6	–	0
Penn	2	–	5	–	0	3	–	6	–	0
Brown	1	–	6	–	0	3	–	6	–	0
Cornell	1	–	6	–	0	2	–	7	–	0
$ – Conference champion; Rankings from AP poll

The 1960 Penn Quakers football team was an American football team that represented the University of Pennsylvania during the 1960 college football season. A year after winning the Ivy League, Penn dropped to sixth place in 1960.

In their first year under head coach John Stiegman, the Quakers compiled a 3–6 record and were outscored 149 to 104. George Koval was the team captain.

Penn's 2–5 conference record was the sixth-best in the Ivy League standings. The Quakers were outscored 108 to 69 by Ivy opponents.

Penn played its home games at Franklin Field adjacent to the university's campus in Philadelphia, Pennsylvania.

== Schedule ==
Date	Opponent	Site	Result	Attendance	Source
September 24	Lafayette*	Franklin Field; Philadelphia, PA	W 35–14	15,617	
October 1	at Dartmouth	Memorial Field; Hanover, NH	L 0–15	10,000	
October 8	Princeton	Franklin Field; Philadelphia, PA (rivalry)	L 0–21	23,114	
October 15	Brown	Franklin Field; Philadelphia, PA	W 36–7	10,875	
October 22	No. 4 Navy*	Franklin Field; Philadelphia, PA	L 0–27	26,123	
October 29	at Harvard	Harvard Stadium; Boston, MA (rivalry)	L 0–8	11,000	
November 5	at Yale	Yale Bowl; New Haven, CT	L 9–34	22,752	
November 12	Columbia	Franklin Field; Philadelphia, PA	L 6–16	15,841	
November 24	Cornell	Franklin Field; Philadelphia, PA (rivalry)	W 18–7	14,413	
*Non-conference game; Rankings from AP Poll released prior to the game
