= 1960 Princeton Tigers football team =

American college football season

1960 Princeton Tigers football
- Conference: Ivy League
- Record: 7–2 (6–1 Ivy)
- Head coach: Dick Colman (4th season)
- Captain: Donald M. Kornrumpf
- Home stadium: Palmer Stadium

1960 Ivy League football standings
	Conf.					Overall
Team	W		L		T	W		L		T
No. 14 Yale $	7	–	0	–	0	9	–	0	–	0
Princeton	6	–	1	–	0	7	–	2	–	0
Dartmouth	4	–	3	–	0	5	–	4	–	0
Harvard	4	–	3	–	0	5	–	4	–	0
Columbia	3	–	4	–	0	3	–	6	–	0
Penn	2	–	5	–	0	3	–	6	–	0
Brown	1	–	6	–	0	3	–	6	–	0
Cornell	1	–	6	–	0	2	–	7	–	0
$ – Conference champion; Rankings from AP poll

The 1960 Princeton Tigers football team was an American football team that represented Princeton University during the 1960 college football season. Princeton finished second in the Ivy League.

In their fourth year under head coach Dick Colman, the Tigers compiled a 7–2 record and outscored opponents 232 to 133. Donald M. Kornrumpf was the team captain.

Princeton's 6–1 conference record was second-best in the Ivy League standings. The Tigers outscored Ivy opponents 188 to 94.

Princeton played its home games at Palmer Stadium on the university campus in Princeton, New Jersey.

== Schedule ==
Date	Opponent	Site	Result	Attendance	Source
September 24	Rutgers*	Palmer Stadium; Princeton, NJ (rivalry)	L 8–13	30,000	
October 1	Columbia	Palmer Stadium; Princeton, NJ	W 49–0	18,000	
October 8	at Penn	Franklin Field; Philadelphia, PA (rivalry)	W 21–0	23,114	
October 15	Colgate*	Palmer Stadium; Princeton, NJ	W 36–26	22,000	
October 22	at Cornell	Schoellkopf Field; Ithaca, NY	W 21–18	18,000	
October 29	Brown	Palmer Stadium; Princeton, NJ	W 54–21	12,000	
November 5	Harvard	Palmer Stadium; Princeton, NJ (rivalry)	W 14–12	36,000	
November 12	at No. 18 Yale	Yale Bowl; New Haven, CT (rivalry)	L 22–43	62,528	
November 19	Dartmouth	Palmer Stadium; Princeton, NJ	W 7–0	32,000	
*Non-conference game; Rankings from AP Poll released prior to the game
