= Penn-Craft Historic District =

Historic district in Pennsylvania, United States

- U.S. National Register of Historic Places
- U.S. Historic district
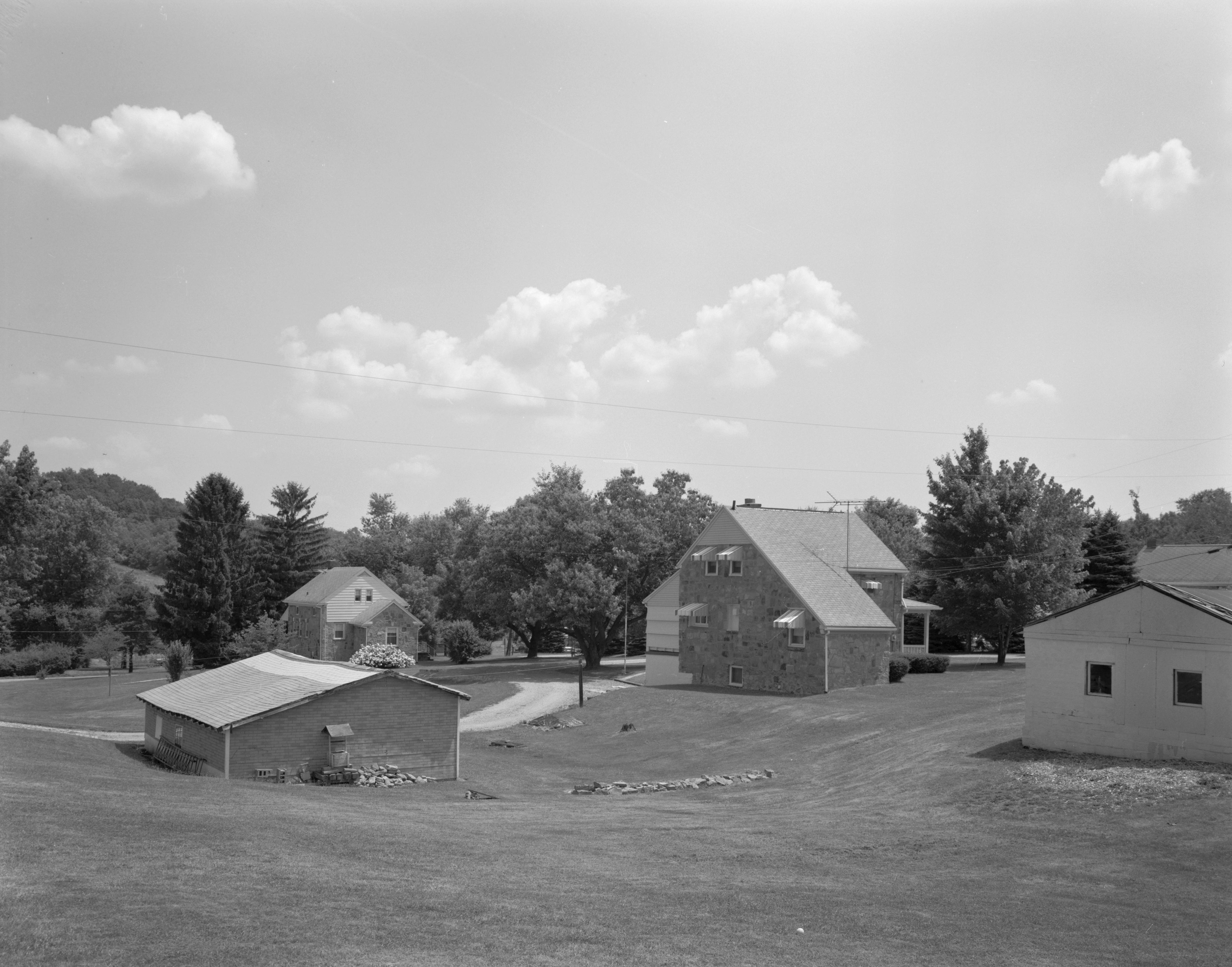
- Buildings in Penncraft, Pennsylvania, Summer 1991

- Location within Pennsylvania Location within the United States
- Location: Roughly bounded by PA 4020, Twp. Rd. 326, and Twp. Rd. 549, Luzerne Township, Pennsylvania
- Coordinates: 39°57′33″N 79°54′45″W
- Area: 175 acres (71 ha)
- Architect: Stanton, William Macy; Day, David
- Architectural style: Colonial Revival
- NRHP reference No.: 89000356
- Added to NRHP: May 18, 1989

The Penn-Craft Historic District is a national historic district that is located in Luzerne Township, Fayette County, Pennsylvania.

It was added to the National Register of Historic Places in 1989.

== History and architectural features ==
This district includes 108 contributing buildings, seven contributing sites, and six contributing structures that are located in the subsistence homestead community of Penn-Craft. The planned community was first built between 1937 and 1943 by the American Friends Service Committee, as a community for unemployed miners. In addition to two pre-Penn Craft dwellings, contributing buildings include the community's remaining frame, "temporary" houses, fifty stone houses, a knitting factory (1939), a cooperative store (1942), and a frame barn.

When the June 2012 Mid-Atlantic and Midwest derecho passed through southwestern Pennsylvania on June 29, 2012, the community's store was destroyed by a fire that was ignited by a lightning strike.
