= 1960 Connecticut Huskies football team =

American college football season

1960 Connecticut Huskies football

Yankee Conference co-champion
- Conference: Yankee Conference
- Record: 5–4 (3–1 Yankee)
- Head coach: Bob Ingalls (9th season)
- Home stadium: Memorial Stadium

1960 Yankee Conference football standings
	Conf.					Overall
Team	W		L		T	W		L		T
Connecticut +	3	–	1	–	0	5	–	4	–	0
UMass +	3	–	1	–	0	7	–	2	–	0
Maine	3	–	2	–	0	4	–	3	–	1
New Hampshire	2	–	2	–	0	4	–	3	–	0
Rhode Island	1	–	4	–	0	3	–	5	–	0
Vermont	0	–	2	–	0	1	–	6	–	0
+ – Conference co-champions

The 1960 Connecticut Huskies football team represented the University of Connecticut in the 1960 college football season. The Huskies were led by ninth-year head coach Bob Ingalls, and completed the season with a record of 5–4.

After the end of the season, an investigation revealed that William "Bill" Minnerly, a player on the team, was involved with the 1961 NCAA University Division men's basketball gambling scandal as a go-between alongside two former University of Alabama men's basketball players. Minnerly was expelled from the University of Connecticut and subsequently banned from playing in the National Football League (NFL).

== Schedule ==
Date	Opponent	Site	Result	Attendance	Source
September 24	at Yale*	Yale Bowl; New Haven, CT	L 8–11	22,678	
October 1	at Rutgers*	Memorial Stadium; Storrs, CT	L 6–19	8,888	
October 8	at UMass	Alumni Field; Amherst, MA (rivalry)	W 31–0	10,500–11,000	
October 15	Maine	Memorial Stadium; Storrs, CT	W 30–2	11,500–11,539	
October 22	Boston University*	Memorial Stadium; Storrs, CT	W 16–14	13,168	
October 29	at New Hampshire	Cowell Stadium; Durham, NH	L 9–17	6,200	
November 5	at Buffalo*	Rotary Field; Buffalo, NY	W 31–24	6,875–6,900	
November 12	Rhode Island	Memorial Stadium; Storrs, CT (rivalry)	W 42–6	12,000–12,194	
November 19	at Holy Cross*	Fitton Field; Worcester, MA	L 6–30	10,000	
*Non-conference game
