= John Stiegman =

Biographical details
- Born: December 16, 1922; Princeton, New Jersey, U.S.
- Died: October 31, 2006 (aged 83); Princeton, New Jersey, U.S.

Playing career
- 1942: Williams
- Position: Tackle

Coaching career (HC unless noted)
- 1946–1955: Princeton (assistant)
- 1956–1959: Rutgers
- 1960–1964: Penn
- 1965: Pittsburgh (assistant)
- 1970–1972: Iowa Wesleyan (DC)
- 1973: Iowa Wesleyan
- 1974: Army (assistant)

Head coaching record
- Overall: 37–53

Accomplishments and honors

Championships
- 2 Middle Three (1958–1959); 1 Middle Atlantic (1958)

John R. Stiegman (December 16, 1922 – October 31, 2006) was an American football player, coach, and college athletics administrator. He served as the head football coach at Rutgers University (1956–1959), the University of Pennsylvania (1960–1964) and Iowa Wesleyan College (1973), compiling a career college football record of 37–53.

Stiegman was born in Princeton, New Jersey, and attended Williams College. He played tackle on the Williams College football team and was also a member of the hockey, lacrosse and swimming teams at Williams. He graduated from Williams in 1944.

Stiegman was an assistant football coach, freshman hockey coach at Princeton University from 1946 to 1955. He was the head football coach at Rutgers from 1956 to 1959 where he compiled a record of 22–15. Rutgers posted an 8–1 record in 1958. In 1960, Stiegman became the head football coach at Penn. He was the head coach at Penn through the 1964 season and compiled a record of 12 wins and 33 losses. He was removed as head coach at Penn after his fifth straight losing season.

Stiegman was an assistant coach at the University of Pittsburgh in 1965. He was hired by Iowa Wesleyan College in 1967 to assist in building a new athletic complex, and became the school's athletic director in 1970. He also served as the defensive coordinator of the football team from 1970 to 1972 and took over as head football coach in 1973. He led Iowa Wesleyan to a record of 3–5 in his only season as head football coach. In 1974, he left Iowa Wesleyan to accept a position as an assistant football coach at the United States Military Academy.

== Head coaching record ==
Year	Team	Overall	Conference	Standing	Bowl/playoffs	AP^{#}
Rutgers Scarlet Knights (Middle Three Conference) (1956–1957)
1956	Rutgers	3–7	1–1	2nd		
1957	Rutgers	5–4	1–1	2nd		
Rutgers Scarlet Knights (Middle Atlantic Conference / Middle Three Conference) (1958–1959)
1958	Rutgers	8–1	4–0 / 2–0	1st (University) / 1st		20
1959	Rutgers	6–3	2–2 / 2–0	T–4th (University) / 1st		
Rutgers:		22–15	8–4			
Penn Quakers (Ivy League) (1960–1964)
1960	Penn	3–6	2–5	6th		
1961	Penn	2–7	1–6	7th		
1962	Penn	3–6	2–5	6th		
1963	Penn	3–6	1–6	8th		
1964	Penn	1–8	0–7	8th		
Penn:		12–33	6–29			
Iowa Wesleyan Tigers (NAIA Division II independent) (1973)
1973	Iowa Wesleyan	3–5				
Iowa Wesleyan:		3–5				
Total:		37–53				
