= Hiller, Pennsylvania =

Unincorporated community in Pennsylvania, US

- Census-designated place
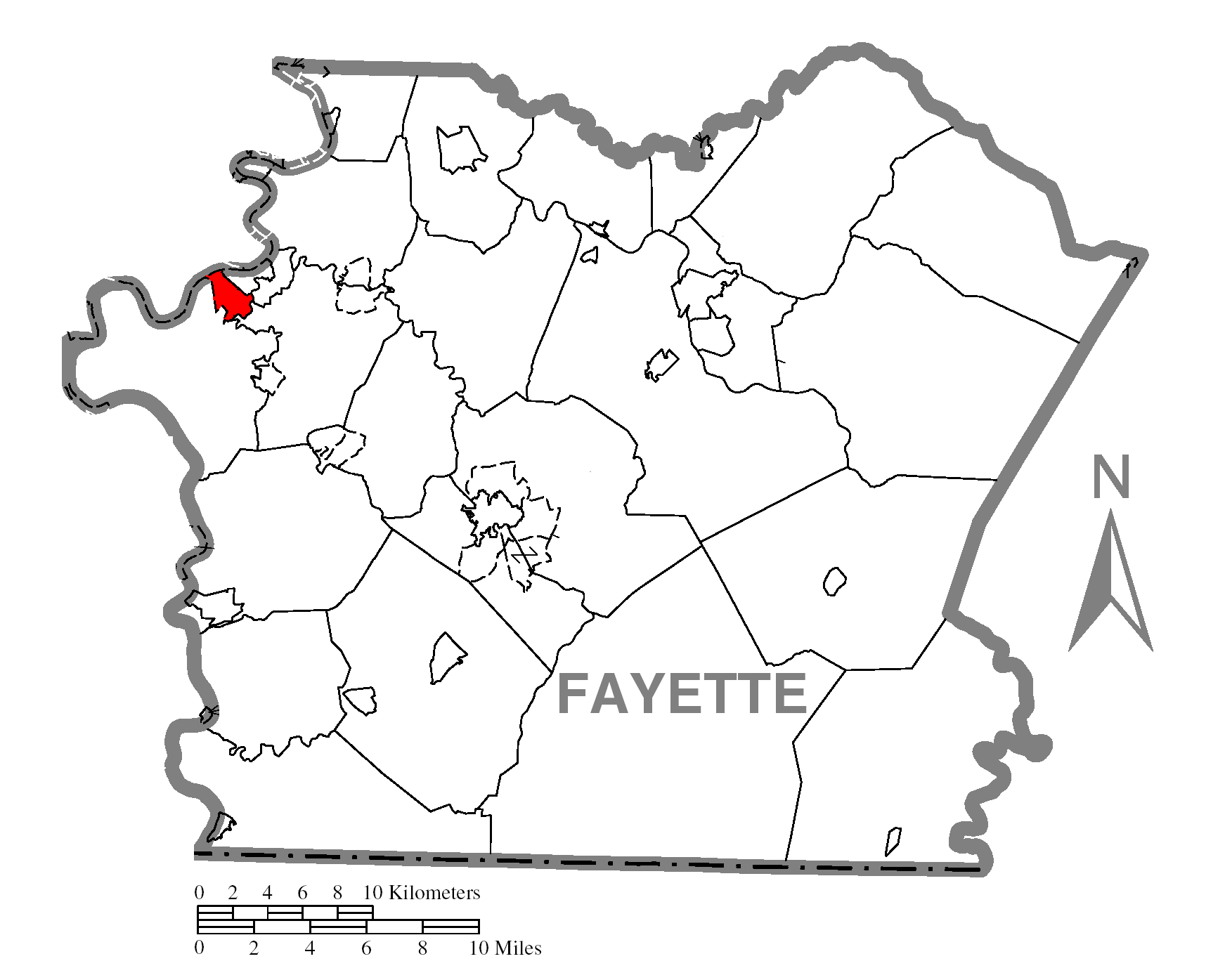
- Location of Hiller in Fayette County
- Coordinates: 40°0′33″N 79°54′16″W
- Country: United States
- State: Pennsylvania
- County: Fayette
- Township: Luzerne

Area
  - Total: 1.77 sq mi (4.58 km^{2})
  - Land: 1.73 sq mi (4.47 km^{2})
  - Water: 0.039 sq mi (0.10 km^{2})

Population (2020)
  - Total: 1,258
  - Density: 728.8/sq mi (281.39/km^{2})
- Time zone: UTC-4 (EST)
  - Summer (DST): UTC-5 (EDT)
- ZIP code: 15444
- Area code: 724
- FIPS code: 42-34784

Hiller is an unincorporated community and census-designated place in Fayette County, Pennsylvania, United States. As of the 2010 census, it had a population of 1,155, down from 1,234 at the 2000 census.

It is located in Luzerne Township.

== Geography ==
Hiller is located in western Fayette County at 40°0′33″N 79°54′16″W (40.009210, −79.904558). It is in the northeast corner of Luzerne Township, bordered to the east by Dunlap Creek, to the northeast by the borough of Brownsville, and to the northwest by the Monongahela River, which forms the Washington County line.

Pennsylvania Route 43, the Mon–Fayette Expressway, passes just south of Hiller, with access from Exit 26, Telegraph Road, which becomes High Street in the center of Hiller. Via PA 43, Uniontown is 16 miles (26 km) to the southeast and downtown Pittsburgh is 41 miles (66 km) to the north.

According to the United States Census Bureau, the Hiller CDP has a total area of 1.57 square miles (4.07 km^{2}), of which 1.52 square miles (3.94 km^{2}) is land and 0.05 square miles (0.13 km^{2}), or 3.08%, is water.

== Demographics ==
Historical population
Census	Pop.	Note	%±
2020	1,258		—
U.S. Decennial Census

As of the 2000 census, there were 1,234 people, 523 households, and 357 families residing in the CDP.

The population density was 813.4 inhabitants per square mile (314.1/km^{2}). There were 567 housing units at an average density of 373.8 per square mile (144.3/km^{2}).

The racial makeup of the CDP was 91.25% White, 6.89% African American, 0.08% Native American, 0.08% Asian, and 1.70% from two or more races. Hispanic or Latino of any race were 0.65% of the population.

There were 523 households, out of which 23.5% had children under the age of eighteen living with them; 52.4% were married couples living together, 12.2% had a female householder with no husband present, and 31.7% were non-families. 29.3% of all households were made up of individuals, and 19.7% had someone living alone who was sixty-five years of age or older.

The average household size was 2.36 and the average family size was 2.87.

In the CDP, the population was spread out, with 20.4% under the age of eighteen, 7.2% from eighteen to twenty-four, 24.5% from twenty-five to forty-four, 23.0% from forty-five to sixty-four, and 24.9% who were sixty-five years of age or older. The median age was forty-four years.

For every one hundred females, there were 89.8 males. For every one hundred females who were aged eighteen or older, there were 84.9 males.

The median income for a household in the CDP was $32,736, and the median income for a family was $36,650. Males had a median income of $30,216 compared with that of $19,722 for females.

The per capita income for the CDP was $15,142.

Roughly 7.0% of families and 18.1% of the population were living below the poverty line, including 29.7% of those who were under the age of eighteen and 18.7% of those who were aged sixty-five or older.
