= 1960 West Chester Golden Rams football team =

American college football season

1960 West Chester Golden Rams football

PSCC champion PSCC East Division champion

PSCC Championship Game, W 35–6 vs. Lock Haven
- Conference: Pennsylvania State College Conference
- East Division

Ranking
- AP: No. 5 (AP small college poll)
- Record: 9–0 (5–0 PSCC)
- Head coach: James Bonder (1st season)
- Home stadium: Farrell Field

1960 Pennsylvania State College Conference football standings
	Conf.					Overall
Team	W		L		T	W		L		T
East Division
No. 8/5 West Chester xy$	5	–	0	–	0	9	–	0	–	0
Millersville	4	–	1	–	0	6	–	3	–	0
Bloomsburg	4	–	2	–	0	5	–	2	–	1
East Stroudsburg	5	–	3	–	0	6	–	3	–	0
Mansfield	2	–	5	–	0	3	–	5	–	0
Kutztown	1	–	5	–	0	1	–	7	–	0
Cheyney	0	–	5	–	0	0	–	7	–	0
West Division
Lock Haven xy	6	–	1	–	0	8	–	2	–	0
California (PA)	5	–	1	–	0	7	–	1	–	0
Slippery Rock	2	–	1	–	2	5	–	1	–	2
Clarion	2	–	4	–	1	3	–	4	–	1
Indiana (PA)	1	–	3	–	2	2	–	4	–	2
Edinboro	1	–	3	–	1	3	–	4	–	1
Shippensburg	2	–	6	–	0	2	–	7	–	0
Championship: West Chester 35, Lock Haven 6
$ – Conference champion; x – Division champion/co-champions; y – Championship game participant; Interdivisional games counted in conference standings.; Rankings from NAIA poll and AP small college poll

The 1960 West Chester Golden Rams football team was an American football team that represented West Chester State College (now known as West Chester University) as a member of the East Division of the Pennsylvania State College Conference (PSCC) during the 1960 college football season. In their first year under head coach James Bonder, the Golden Rams compiled a perfect 9–0 record (6–0 against PSCC opponents), won the PSCC championship, and outscored opponents by a total of 311 to 68. They were ranked fifth in the final AP small college poll.

Bonder took over as head coach after spending the previous 14 years as the line coach on Glenn Killinger's coaching staff at West Chester. In addition to the turnover at head coach, the Rams lost Little All-American end Bill Campbell and quarterback Ted Kowal to graduation.

West Chester's sophomore fullback Joe Iacone was the small-college rushing champion with 1,438 rushing yards in nine games in 1960. He rushed for a season-high 201 yards and scored three touchdowns against Bloomsburg.

Iacone was the top vote-getter on the 1960 PSCC all-star team selected by the conference coaches. Back Jim Pribula was also named to the first team. Four other West Chester players were named to the second team: back Vince Bonkoski; end Bill Gray; guard Cordell Godbolte; and center Lou Capararo. The team's statistical leaders included Iacone with 1,438 rushing yards, Bonkoski with 1,254 passing yards, and Jim Pribula with 416 receiving yards.

The 1960 season was one of five perfect seasons in West Chester Rams football history, the others being 1923, 1928, 1952, and 1957.

The team played its home game at Farrell Field (formerly known as Wayne Field) in West Chester, Pennsylvania.

== Schedule ==
Date	Opponent	Rank	Site	Result	Attendance	Source
September 16	at Fort Eustis*		Fort Eustis, VA	W 30–27	2,500	
September 23	Ithaca*		Farrell Field; West Chester, PA	W 19–8	6,300–6,700	
September 30	East Stroudsburg		Farrell Field; West Chester, PA	W 21–0	7,200	
October 8	at Millersville		Millersville, PA	W 42–0	4,900	
October 15	at Clarion		Clarion, PA	W 49–14	9,800	
October 21	Kutztown		Farrell Field; West Chester, PA	W 60–0	5,500	
October 29	at American International*		Springfield, MA	W 13–0	1,000	
November 11	Bloomsburg		Farrell Field; West Chester, PA	W 42–13	8,400	
November 19	Lock Haven*	No. 9	Farrell Field; West Chester, PA (PSCC Championship Game)	W 35–6	6,400	
*Non-conference game; Rankings from AP Poll released prior to the game
