= 1957 Big Ten Conference football season =

- Sport: American football
- Teams: 10
- Top draft pick: Dan Currie
- Champion: Ohio State
- Runners-up: Michigan State
- Season MVP: Jim Pace

Football seasons
- ← 1956 1958 →

1957 Big Ten Conference football standings
	Conf.					Overall
Team	W		L		T	W		L		T
No. 2 Ohio State $	7	–	0	–	0	9	–	1	–	0
No. 3 Michigan State	5	–	1	–	0	8	–	1	–	0
No. 6 Iowa	4	–	1	–	1	7	–	1	–	1
No. 19 Wisconsin	4	–	3	–	0	6	–	3	–	0
Purdue	4	–	3	–	0	5	–	4	–	0
Michigan	3	–	3	–	1	5	–	3	–	1
Illinois	3	–	4	–	0	4	–	5	–	0
Minnesota	3	–	5	–	0	4	–	5	–	0
Indiana	0	–	6	–	0	1	–	8	–	0
Northwestern	0	–	7	–	0	0	–	9	–	0
$ – Conference champion; Rankings from AP Poll

The 1957 Big Ten Conference football season was the 62nd season of college football played by the member schools of the Big Ten Conference (also known as the Western Conference) and was a part of the 1957 college football season.

The 1957 Ohio State Buckeyes football team, under head coach Woody Hayes, won the conference championship with a 7-0 conference record (9–1 record overall), was ranked No. 1 in the final Coaches' Poll, and defeated Oregon in the 1958 Rose Bowl. The Buckeyes were ranked No.2 in the final AP Poll, but were also declared national champion by the FWAA poll. Ohio State back Don Clark led the conference with 737 rushing yards. Guard Aurealius Thomas was a first-team All-American.

The 1957 Michigan State Spartans football team, under head coach Duffy Daugherty, compiled an 8–1 record and was ranked No. 3 in the final AP and UPI polls. Michigan State back Walt Kowalczyk and center Dan Currie were selected as consensus first-team All-Americans. Kowalczyk led the conference with 54 points scored, and Currie was selected as the team's most valuable player.

The 1957 Iowa Hawkeyes football team, under head coach Forest Evashevski, finished third in the Big Ten with a 7–1–1 record and was ranked No. 8 in the final AP Poll. Iowa tackle Alex Karras was a consensus first-team All-American and won the Outland Trophy as the best interior lineman in college football. Quarterback Randy Duncan led the Big Ten with 1,124 passing yards and 1,183 total yards.

Michigan halfback Jim Pace won the Chicago Tribune Silver Football trophy as the conference's most valuable player.

== Season overview ==
=== Results and team statistics ===
Conf. Rank	Team	Head coach	AP final	AP high	Overall record	Conf. record	PPG	PAG	MVP
1	Ohio State	Woody Hayes	#2	#2	9–1	7–0	26.7	9.2	Bill Jobko
2	Michigan State	Duffy Daugherty	#3	#1	8–1	5–1	**29.3**	**8.3**	Dan Currie
3	Iowa	Forest Evashevski	#6	#3	7–1–1	4–1–1	29.2	12.4	Bob Commings
4 (tie)	Wisconsin	Milt Bruhn	#19	#13	6–3	4–3	26.0	13.6	Dan Lewis
4 (tie)	Purdue	Jack Mollenkopf	NR	NR	5–4	4–3	19.8	12.7	Neil Habig
6	Michigan	Bennie Oosterbaan	NR	#6	5–3–1	3–3–1	20.8	16.3	**Jim Pace**
7	Illinois	Ray Eliot	NR	#15	4–5	3–4	18.6	14.8	Ron Hansen
8	Minnesota	Murray Warmath	NR	#3	4–5	3–5	22.3	20.9	Dick Larson
9	Indiana	Bob Hicks	NR	NR	1–8	0–6	5.2	34.1	Tony Aloisio
10	Northwestern	Ara Parseghian	NR	NR	0–9	0–7	6.3	30.1	Willmer Fowler

Key
AP final = Team's rank in the final AP Poll of the 1957 season
AP high = Team's highest rank in the AP Poll throughout the 1957 season
PPG = Average of points scored per game
PAG = Average of points allowed per game
MVP = Most valuable player as voted by players on each team as part of the voting process to determine the winner of the Chicago Tribune Silver Football trophy; trophy winner in bold

== Statistical leaders ==
The Big Ten's individual statistical leaders include the following:

=== Passing yards ===
1. Randy Duncan, Iowa (1,124)
2. Jim Ninowski, Michigan State (718)
3. Tom Haller, Illinois (675)
4. Jim Van Pelt, Michigan (629)
5. Tom McDonald, Indiana (544)

=== Rushing yards ===
1. Don Clark, Ohio State (737)
2. Jim Pace, Michigan (664)
3. Bob White, Ohio State (645)
4. Danny Lewis, Wisconsin (611)
5. Walt Kowalczyk, Michigan State (545)

=== Receiving yards ===
1. Jim Gibbons, Iowa (587)
2. Dave Whitsell, Indiana (290)
3. Dave Kaiser, Michigan State (267)
4. Sam Williams, Michigan State (236)
5. Gary Prahst, Michigan (233)

=== Total yards ===
1. Randy Duncan, Iowa (1,183)
2. Don Clark, Ohio State (788)
3. Tom Haller, Illinois (724)
4. Sidney Williams, Wisconsin (661)
5. Jim Pace, Michigan (656)

=== Point scored ===
1. Walt Kowalczyk, Michigan State (54)
1. Jim Pace, Michigan (54)
1. Don Clark, Ohio State (54)
4. Frank Kremblas, Ohio State (48)
4. Dick LeBeau, Ohio State (48)

== Awards and honors ==
=== All-Big Ten honors ===
The following players were picked by the Associated Press (AP) and/or the United Press (UP) as first-team players on the 1957 All-Big Ten Conference football team.

Position	Name	Team	Selectors
Quarterback	Jim Ninowski	Michigan State	AP, UP
Halfback	Jim Pace	Michigan	AP, UP
Halfback	Don Clark	Ohio State	AP, UP
Fullback	Walt Kowalczyk	Michigan State	AP, UP
End	Jim Gibbons	Iowa	AP, UP
End	Leo Brown	Ohio State	AP
End	Sam Williams	Michigan State	UP
Tackle	Alex Karras	Iowa	AP, UP
Tackle	Pat Burke	Michigan State	AP, UP
Guard	Aurealius Thomas	Ohio State	AP, UP
Guard	Frank Bloomquist	Iowa	AP
Guard	Ellison Kelly	Michigan State	UP
Center	Dan Currie	Michigan State	AP, UP

=== All-American honors ===
At the end of the 1957 season, Big Ten players secured three of the consensus first-team picks for the 1957 College Football All-America Team. The Big Ten's consensus All-American was:

Position	Name	Team	Selectors
Tackle	Alex Karras	Iowa	AAB, AP, FWAA, INS, NEA, SN, UP, Time, WCFF
Back	Walt Kowalczyk	Michigan State	AFCA, FWAA, NEA, SN, UP, Time, WCFF
Center	Dan Currie	Michigan State	AAB, AFCA, AP, FWAA, INS, Time, WCFF

Other Big Ten players who were named first-team All-Americans by at least one selector were:

Position	Name	Team	Selectors
End	Jim Gibbons	Iowa	FWAA, TSN, UP
Guard	Aurealius Thomas	Ohio State	AAB, AFCA, AP, FWAA
Back	Jim Pace	Michigan	AAB, AP

=== Other awards ===
Iowa tackle Alex Karras won the Outland Trophy as the best interior lineman in college football.

The Heisman Trophy was awarded to John David Crow of Texas A&M. Three Big Ten players finished among the top 10 in the voting for the trophy. They were: defensive lineman Alex Karras of Iowa (second); running back Walt Kowalczyk of Michigan State; and offensive lineman Dan Currie of Michigan State.

== 1958 NFL draft ==
The following Big Ten players were among the first 100 picks in the 1958 NFL draft:

Name	Position	Team	Round	Overall pick
Center	Dan Currie	Michigan State	1	3
Fullback	Walt Kowalczyk	Michigan State	1	6
Halfback	Jim Pace	Michigan	1	8
Defensive tackle	Alex Karras	Iowa	1	10
Tackle	Frank Youso	Minnesota	2	23
Linebacker	Ray Nitschke	Illinois	3	36
Defensive back	Erich Barnes	Purdue	4	42
Tackle	Frank Rigney	Iowa	4	43
Quarterback	Jim Ninowski	Michigan State	4	49
End	Bob Jewett	Michigan State	5	53
Quarterback	Jim Van Pelt	Michigan	5	54
End	Jim Gibbons	Iowa	5	61
Back	Jim Wulff	Michigan State	6	72
Back	Danny Lewis	Wisconsin	6	73
End	Jon Jelacic	Minnesota	7	74
Guard	Bill Jobko	Ohio State	7	80
Halfback	Bobby Mitchell	Illinois	7	84
Back	Don Sutherin	Ohio State	8	94
