= Randy Duncan =

American gridiron football player (1937–2016)

No. 98, 25, 36, 24, 15
- Position: Quarterback

Personal information
- Born: March 15, 1937; Osage, Iowa, U.S.
- Died: September 27, 2016 (aged 79); Des Moines, Iowa, U.S.
- Listed height: 6 ft 0 in (1.83 m)
- Listed weight: 185 lb (84 kg)

Career information
- High school: Roosevelt (Des Moines)
- College: Iowa (1955–1958)
- NFL draft: 1959: 1st round, 1st overall pick

Career history

Playing
- BC Lions (1959–1960); Dallas Texans (1961); Des Moines Warriors (1965)

Coaching
- Des Moines Warriors (1965–1966) Assistant coach

Awards and highlights
- National champion (1958); Helms Foundation Player of the Year (1958); Walter Camp Foundation Player of the Year (1958); Unanimous All-American (1958); NCAA passing yards leader (1958); Chicago Tribune Silver Football (1958); First-team All-Big Ten (1958); Second-team All-Big Ten (1957)

Career AFL statistics
- Passing attempts: 67
- Passing completions: 25
- Completion percentage: 37.3%
- TD–INT: 1–3
- Passing yards: 361
- Passer rating: 41.9
- Stats at Pro Football Reference
- College Football Hall of Fame

Hearst Randolph Duncan Jr. (March 15, 1937 – September 27, 2016) was an American professional football player who was a quarterback in the Canadian Football League (CFL) and American Football League (AFL). He played college football for the Iowa Hawkeyes and was inducted into the College Football Hall of Fame in 1997.

He played for Iowa in the Big Ten Conference and played in two Rose Bowls (January 1957, 1959). He was the first overall pick in the 1959 NFL draft by the Green Bay Packers, but played professionally for CFL's BC Lions and the AFL's Dallas Texans. After his football career, he became a lawyer.

== Early life ==
Duncan was born to Hearst and Louise Duncan in 1937, in Osage, Iowa. He moved with his family to Mason City before finally attending Roosevelt High School in Des Moines. Duncan was a highly regarded prospect in both football and basketball. He was a first team all-state guard on the Roosevelt basketball team that lost in the 1954 state championship game. Duncan was a first team all-state quarterback for Roosevelt, leading the Roughriders to an undefeated season and a state title in 1954. The teams only lost two games in his three years there.

Duncan graduated from high school after the 1954 fall semester, and he was heavily recruited after choosing to play football. He nearly went to the University of Colorado in Boulder, but decided to attend the University of Iowa in Iowa City largely because of his friendship with Iowa assistant coach Bump Elliott.

== College career ==
His college career got off to a slow start. As a mid-year graduate and due to freshman ineligibility, Duncan had to wait one and a half years to play, joining Iowa in the spring of 1955 but seeing his first action as a sophomore in the fall of 1956. Duncan became very discouraged over being constantly berated by Iowa coach Forest Evashevski and being clobbered in practice by Cal Jones. "Time after time, I was going to quit and transfer to Iowa State," Duncan has said.

But Duncan remained in Iowa City and waited his turn as the backup to Hawkeyes star Ken Ploen in the 1956 season. In a non-conference game against Oregon State, the offense produced a pair of fourth-quarter touchdowns after he replaced the injured Ploen in the 14–13 triumph. Iowa qualified for the Rose Bowl, where they faced Oregon State again. Duncan entered the game in the second quarter after Ploen left the game briefly and led the offense to a touchdown in a 35–19 rout.

Duncan was named the starter and paced the team in passing in 1957. He battled snow and sleet to throw a touchdown pass for the only score in a win over Northwestern, and he missed the end of Iowa's tie with Michigan because of leg cramps. Duncan scored four touchdowns, two passing and two rushing, against Minnesota, and two touchdowns against Notre Dame, one passing and one on an interception return as a defensive back. Iowa went 7–1–1 on the season, and Duncan was named first team All-Big Ten.

As a senior in 1958, Duncan helped guide Iowa to one of its best seasons ever. After a surprising early season tie against Air Force, Iowa won five straight Big Ten games, clinching the Big Ten title as early as it had ever been clinched before. The Hawkeyes ranked first in passing and total offense in the Big Ten, while Duncan led the nation in completion percentage and passing yardage.

Duncan's greatest game may have come in Iowa's lone loss in 1958, when he set a Big Ten record with 23 completions in 33 attempts for 249 yards in a 38–28 loss to Ohio State. Duncan led Iowa to another Big Ten title and a 38–12 victory in the Rose Bowl. His lone touchdown pass in the Rose Bowl broke the school record for touchdown passes in a season, which had been set by Nile Kinnick in 1939.

Duncan was named first team All-Big Ten. He was also named the 1958 Big Ten MVP, and he was selected as a consensus first team All-American. He won the Walter Camp Award and finished second in the Heisman Trophy balloting. Duncan is one of seven Iowa players to letter from 1956 through 1958. In that span, Iowa's record was 24–3–2 (.862) with two Big Ten titles, three top ten rankings in the final Associated Press poll, and two Rose Bowl victories.

Upon being voted Iowa's MVP, Duncan remarked, "There's nobody that knows any better than I do that this was all made possible by you guys here and the coaching staff behind me. I mean it. Just to be a part of this ball club was all that I really ever wanted."

== Professional football career ==
Duncan was the first overall selection of the 1959 NFL draft, taken by the Green Bay Packers on December 1, 1958, the same day that his runner-up finish in the Heisman Trophy vote went public. However, he had reservations about a pro football career, especially one with a Packers team that had the worst record in the league at the time. It took a generous contract offer from the British Columbia Lions to lure him to the Canadian Football League instead. He later explained, "That was Green Bay before Vince Lombardi (who was hired two months after the draft), and Canada offered a lot more dough."

Whereas Iowa predecessor Ken Ploen left an indelible mark north of the border, where he became an all-time CFL great, Duncan proved to be ill-suited for the more wide-open Canadian style of game. In two seasons, he completed 47.6 percent of his pass attempts and threw nearly twice as many interceptions (42) as touchdowns (25) in the regular season.

After the Lions released him, Duncan signed with the American Football League's Dallas Texans (now the Kansas City Chiefs) in advance of the 1961 campaign. The newcomer practiced with the Texans during the day and attended Southern Methodist University law school at night. He was injured early in his first start in Week 2 and played sparingly the rest of the season. When Texans coach Hank Stram was reunited with former Purdue star Len Dawson before the next season, Duncan quit football to continue his pursuit of a law degree.

== After football ==
Duncan finished law school at Drake University, and for years, operated a successful law practice in Des Moines. Duncan married Paula Mathieson in 1960, and they had three sons: Jed, Matt and Scott. Jed and Matt Duncan played football at Yale University and the University of Iowa, respectively. Two of Randy Duncan's grandsons, Cole and Kyle Duncan, played football at Bowdoin College. Duncan died in Des Moines on September 27, 2016, from brain cancer.

== Honors ==
Duncan was inducted into the Iowa Sports Hall of Fame in 1976 and the College Football Hall of Fame in 1997. In 1999, Sports Illustrated selected Randy Duncan as the 28th greatest sports figure in the history of the state of Iowa. Duncan was named honorary captain of the Iowa football team during the Iowa – Maine football game in 2008.

== See also ==
- List of American Football League players
- List of college football yearly passing leaders
