= 1957 All-Big Ten Conference football team =

American college football all-star team

The 1957 All-Big Ten Conference football team consists of American football players chosen by the Associated Press (AP) and the United Press (UP) as the best players at their positions during the 1957 Big Ten Conference football season. The UP team was selected by the Big Ten head coaches.

The 1957 Ohio State Buckeyes football team, under head coach Woody Hayes, won the conference championship and placed three players on the first team: halfback Don Clark (AP-1, UP-1); guard Aurealius Thomas (AP-1, UP-1); and end Leo Brown (AP-1, UP-2). Thomas was also selected as a first-team All-American by the AP and American Football Coaches Association.

The 1957 Michigan State Spartans football team, under head coach Duffy Daugherty, finished in second place and placed six players on the first team: quarterback Jim Ninowski (AP-1, UP-1); halfback Walt Kowalczyk (AP-1, UP-1); center Dan Currie (AP-1, UP-1); tackle Pat Burke (AP-1, UP-1); end Sam Williams (AP-2, UP-1); and guard Ellison Kelly (UP-1). Kowaczyk and Currie were also consensus All-Americans.

The 1957 Iowa Hawkeyes football team, under head coach Forest Evashevski, finished third and placed three players on the first team: tackle Alex Karras (AP-1, UP-1); end Jim Gibbons (AP-1, UP-1); and guard Frank Bloomquist (AP-1, UP-2). Karras was also a consensus All-American.

== All-Big Ten selections ==
=== Backs ===
- Jim Ninowski, Michigan State (AP-1 [qb]; UP-1)
- Jim Pace, Michigan (AP-1 [hb]; UP-1)
- Don Clark, Ohio State (AP-1 [hb]; UP-1)
- Walt Kowalczyk, Michigan State (AP-1 [hb]; UP-1)
- Dan Lewis, Wisconsin (AP-2, UP-2)
- Frank Kremblas, Ohio State (AP-2, UP-3)
- Ray Nitschke, Illinois (AP-3, UP-2)
- Randy Duncan, Iowa (UP-2)
- Bob White, Ohio State (AP-2, UP-2)
- Blanche Martin, Michigan State (AP-3, UP-3)
- Jim Van Pelt, Michigan (AP-3)
- Collins Hagler, Iowa (AP-3)
- Bobby Mitchell, Illinois (AP-2; UP-3)
- Bob Blakely, Minnesota (UP-3)

=== Ends ===
- Jim Gibbons, Iowa (AP-1; UP-1)
- Leo Brown, Ohio State (AP-1, UP-2)
- Sam Williams, Michigan State (AP-2, UP-1)
- Dave Kaiser, Michigan State (AP-2, UP-2)
- Rod Hanson, Illinois (AP-3, AP-2)
- Tom Franckhauser, Purdue (UP-3)
- Earl Hill, Wisconsin (AP-3)

=== Tackles ===
- Alex Karras, Iowa (AP-1; UP-1)
- Patrick F. Burke, Michigan State (AP-1; UP-1)
- Dick Klein, Iowa (AP-2, UP-2)
- Nick Mumley, Purdue (AP-2)
- Jim Marshall, Ohio State (AP-3, UP-2)
- Frank Youso, Minnesota (AP-3, UP-3)
- Fran O'Brien, Michigan State (UP-3)

=== Guards ===
- Aurealius Thomas, Ohio State (AP-1; UP-1)
- Frank Bloomquist, Iowa (AP-1, UP-2)
- Ellison Kelly, Michigan State (UP-1)
- David Burkholder, Minnesota (AP-2, UP-2)
- Bob Commings, Iowa (AP-2)
- John Jardine, Purdue (AP-3)
- Bill Burrell, Illinois (AP-3)
- Ron Sabal, Purdue (UP-3)
- Bill Gehler, Wisconsin (UP-3)

=== Centers ===
- Dan Currie, Michigan State (AP-1; UP-1)
- Neil Habig, Purdue (AP-2, UP-2)
- Dick Teteak, Wisconsin (AP-3, UP-3)

== Key ==
AP = Associated Press, selected in a poll of AP writers

UP = United Press, selected by the conference coaches

Bold = one of the nine players chosen as a first-team selection by both the AP and UP

== See also ==
- 1957 College Football All-America Team
