= 1957 Iowa Hawkeyes football team =

American college football season

1957 Iowa Hawkeyes football
- Conference: Big Ten Conference

Ranking
- Coaches: No. 5
- AP: No. 6
- Record: 7–1–1 (4–1–1 Big Ten)
- Head coach: Forest Evashevski (6th season)
- MVP: Bob Commings
- Captain: Bob Commings
- Home stadium: Iowa Stadium

1957 Big Ten Conference football standings
	Conf.					Overall
Team	W		L		T	W		L		T
No. 2 Ohio State $	7	–	0	–	0	9	–	1	–	0
No. 3 Michigan State	5	–	1	–	0	8	–	1	–	0
No. 6 Iowa	4	–	1	–	1	7	–	1	–	1
No. 19 Wisconsin	4	–	3	–	0	6	–	3	–	0
Purdue	4	–	3	–	0	5	–	4	–	0
Michigan	3	–	3	–	1	5	–	3	–	1
Illinois	3	–	4	–	0	4	–	5	–	0
Minnesota	3	–	5	–	0	4	–	5	–	0
Indiana	0	–	6	–	0	1	–	8	–	0
Northwestern	0	–	7	–	0	0	–	9	–	0
$ – Conference champion; Rankings from AP Poll

The 1957 Iowa Hawkeyes football team was an American football team that represented the University of Iowa as a member of the Big Ten Conference during the 1957 Big Ten football season. In their sixth season under head coach Forest Evashevski, the Hawkeyes compiled a 7–1–1 record (4–1–1 in conference games), finished in third place in the Big Ten, and outscored opponents by a total of 263 to 112. They defeated No. 13 Wisconsin (21–7) and No. 9 Notre Dame (21–13), tied No. 12 Michigan, and lost to No. 6 Ohio State. They also scored 70 points against Utah State, the highest score tallied by an Iowa team since 1914. The Hawkeyes were ranked No. 6 in the final AP poll and No. 5 in the final UPI poll.

The 1957 Hawkeyes gained 2,170 rushing yards and 1,303 passing yards. On defense, they gave up 1,014 rushing yards and 967 passing yards. Their total defense of 220.1 yards per game remains the second best mark in school history. They also set a school record (since broken) with 656 yards of total offense against Minnesota.

The team's statistical leaders included halfback Collins Hagler (456 rushing yards), quarterback Randy Duncan (70-of-119 passing for 1,124 yards), end Jim Gibbons (36 receptions for 587 yards), and kicker Bob Prescott (42 points). Tackle Alex Karras won the Outland Trophy, finished second in the Heisman Trophy voting, and was a consensus All-American. Gibbons, who set a school record with nine receptions for 164 yards against Minnesota, was the team captain and also received first-team All-America honors. Guard Bob Commings was selected as the team's most valuable player.

The team played its home games at Iowa Stadium in Iowa City, Iowa. Home attendance totaled 203,709, an average of 50,927 per game.

== Schedule ==
Date	Opponent	Rank	Site	TV	Result	Attendance	Source
September 28	Utah State*	No. 12	Iowa Stadium; Iowa City, IA		W 70–14	40,125	
October 5	Washington State*	No. 8	Iowa Stadium; Iowa City, IA		W 20–13	47,334	
October 12	at Indiana	No. 8	Memorial Stadium; Bloomington, IN		W 47–7	23,000	
October 19	No. 13 Wisconsin^{†}	No. 6	Iowa Stadium; Iowa City, IA (rivalry)		W 21–7	58,147	
October 26	at Northwestern	No. 3	Dyche Stadium; Evanston, IA		W 6–0	42,719	
November 2	at No. 12 Michigan	No. 3	Michigan Stadium; Ann Arbor, MI	NBC	T 21–21	90,478	
November 9	Minnesota	No. 5	Iowa Stadium; Iowa City, IA (rivalry)		W 44–20	58,103	
November 16	at No. 6 Ohio State	No. 5	Ohio Stadium; Columbus, OH		L 13–17	82,935	
November 23	at No. 9 Notre Dame*	No. 8	Notre Dame Stadium; Notre Dame, IN	NBC	W 21–13	58,734	
*Non-conference game; ^{†}Homecoming; Rankings from AP Poll released prior to the game; Source:

== Rankings ==
Ranking movements Legend: ██ Increase in ranking ██ Decrease in ranking ( ) = First-place votes
	Week											
Poll	Pre	1	2	3	4	5	6	7	8	9	10	Final
AP	9 (4)	12 (1)	8 (3)	8 (4)	6 (10)	3 (16)	3 (20)	5 (12)	5 (19)	8 (2)	6 (7)	6 (7)
Coaches												5

== Game summaries ==
=== Ohio State ===
Team	1	2	3	4	Total
No. 5 Hawkeyes	6	0	7	0	13
• No. 6 Buckeyes	3	7	0	7	17

- Date: November 16
- Location: Ohio Stadium
- Game attendance: 82,935
- Game weather: Clear, 60 °F (16 °C)

Scoring summary
1	OSU	Sutherin 18 yard field goal	OSU 3–0
1	IOWA	Duncan 8 yard pass to Prescott (kick failed)	IOWA 6–3
2	OSU	Kremblas 1 yard run (Sutherin kick)	OSU 10–6
3	IOWA	Duncan 1 yard run (Prescott kick)	IOWA 13–10
4	OSU	White 5 yard run (Sutherin kick)	OSU 17–13

=== Notre Dame ===
Team	1	2	3	4	Total
• No. 8 Hawkeyes	7	7	0	7	21
No. 9 Fighting Irish	0	6	7	0	13

- Date: November 23
- Location: Notre Dame Stadium

Scoring summary
1	5:39	IOWA	John Nocera 36-yard run (Prescott kick)	IOWA 7–0
2		IOWA	Randy Duncan 24-yard interception return (Prescott kick)	IOWA 14–0
2		ND	Monty Stickles 45-yard pass from George Izo (kick blocked)	IOWA 14–6
3		ND	Ron Toth 15-yard run (Stickles kick)	IOWA 14–13
4		IOWA	Don Norton 16-yard pass from Duncan (Prescott kick)	IOWA 21–13

== Personnel ==
=== Players ===
The following players received varsity letters for their performance on the 1957 Iowa football team:

- Frank Bloomquist, guard, senior, 6-2, 205 pounds, Waterloo, IA
- Donald Bowen, guard, senior, 6-2, 198 pounds, East St. Louis, IL
- John A. Burroughs Jr., tackle, junior, No. 72, 5-9, 173 pounds, Youngstown, OH
- Bob Commings, guard, senior, No. 50, 174 pounds
- Hugh Drake, guard, junior, 6-0, 190 pounds, Shenandoah, IA
- Randy Duncan, quarterback, junior, No. 25, 6-0, 180 pounds, Des Moines, IA
- Kevin Furlong, halfback, junior, 5-9, 167 pounds, Detroit
- Jim Gibbons, end, senior, No. 88, 6-3, 200 pounds, Chicago
- William Gravel, halfback, junior 5-8, 180 pounds, Hobart, IN
- Gary Grouwinkel, guard, junior, 6-1, 200 pounds, Wapello, IA
- Collins Hagler, halfback, senior, No. 44, 5-9, 163 pounds, Washington, DC
- William Happel, halfback, senior, 5-11, 163 pounds, Cedar Rapids, IA
- Fred Harris, fullback, senior, 6-1, 194 pounds, Ran'burn, IL
- Donald Horn, fullback, sophomore, 5-10, 183 pounds, Detroit
- Jon Janda, fullback, senior, 5-11, 175 pounds, Cedar Rapids, IA
- Ray Jauch, halfback, sophomore, 5-11, 175 pounds, Mendota, IL
- Jerry Jenkinson, end, senior, 6-2, 175 pounds, Des Moines, IA
- Bob Jeter, halfback, sophomore, 6-1, 185 pounds, Weirton, WV
- Alex Karras, tackle, senior, No. 77, 6-2, 233 pounds, Gary, IN
- Dick Klein, tackle, 251 pounds
- Delmar Kloewer, quarterback, senior, 6-0, 175 pounds, Manilla, IA
- Mel Knotts, halfback, junior, 5-9, 172 pounds, Burlington, IA
- Bill Lapham, center, sophomore, 6-3, 250 pounds, Des Moines, IA
- Mac Lewis, center, junior, 6-6, 280 pounds, Chicago
- Curt Merz, end, sophomore, 6-4, 220 pounds, Springfield, NJ
- John Nocera, fullback, junior, 6-1, 203 pounds, Youngstown, OH
- Don Norton, end, sophomore, 6-1, 175 pounds, Anamosa, IA
- Charles Pierce, center, senior, 6-2, 185 pounds, Sycamore, IL
- Robert Prescott, end, junior, 6-3, 200 pounds, Sioux City, IA
- Frank Rigney, tackle, senior, 6-4, 212 pounds, Pana, IL
- Geno Sessi, halfback, sophomore, 5-8, 170 pounds, St. Clairsville, OH
- Dominic Sgro, guard, senior, 5-11, 206 pounds, Hackensack, NJ
- Richard Theer, tackle, senior, 6-3, 204 pounds, Davenport, IA
- Olen Treadway, quarterback, junior, 5-10, 170 pounds, Muskogee, OK
- Gene Veit, quarterback, senior, 5-11, 177 pounds, Clinton, IA

=== Coaches and administrators ===
- Head coach - Forest Evashevski
- Assistant coaches - Jerry Burns

== Awards and honors ==
Tackle Alex Karras won the Outland Trophy as the best interior lineman in college football. He also ranked second in the voting for the Heisman Trophy and was selected as a consensus first-team All-American.

End Jim Gibbons was the team captain. He was selected as a first-team All-American by the United Press (UP), Football Writers Association of America, The Sporting News.

Guard Bob Commings was selected after the season as the team's most valuable player.

Tackle Dick Klein was selected by the UP as a third-team All-American.

Seven Iowa players received recognition on the 1957 All-Big Ten Conference football team: Karras (AP-1, UP-1); Gibbons (AP-1, UP-1); Klein (AP-2, UP-2); guard Frank Bloomquist (Ap-1, UP-2); guard Bob Commings (AP-2); quarterback Randy Duncan (UP-2); and halfback Collins Hagler (AP-3).

Five players from the 1957 were later inducted into the Iowa Letterwinners Club Hall of Fame: Randy Duncan; Jim Gibbons; Bob Jeter; Alex Karras; and Don Norton.

== 1958 NFL draft ==
Player	Position	Round	Pick	NFL club
Alex Karras	Defensive tackle	1	10	Detroit Lions
Frank Rigney	Tackle	4	43	Philadelphia Eagles
Jim Gibbons	End	5	Cleveland Browns	
Bill Lapham	Center	14	160	Philadelphia Eagles
Bill Van Buren	Center	17	196	Philadelphia Eagles
John Burroughs	Tackle	18	208	Philadelphia Eagles
Frank Bloomquist	Guard	26	306	Washington Redskins
