= 1957 Rose Bowl =

American college football game

- 43rd Rose Bowl Game
Oregon State Beavers	Iowa Hawkeyes
(7–2–1)	(8–1)
Pacific Coast	Big Ten
19	35
Head coach: Tommy Prothro	Head coach: Forest Evashevski
AP / Coaches; 10 / 13	AP / Coaches; 3 / 3
	1	2	3	4	Total
Oregon State	0	6	6	7	19
Iowa	14	7	7	7	35
- Date: January 1, 1957
- Season: 1956
- Stadium: Rose Bowl
- Location: Pasadena, California
- MVP: Ken Ploen (Iowa QB)
- Favorite: Iowa by 8 to 9 points
- Referee: John Kennedy (Pacific Coast; split crew: Pacific Coast, Big Ten)
- Attendance: 97,126

United States TV coverage
- Network: NBC (B/W) 54.9 million viewers.
- Announcers: Mel Allen, Lee Giroux

The 1957 Rose Bowl was the 43rd edition of the college football bowl game, played at the Rose Bowl in Pasadena, California, on Tuesday, January 1. The third-ranked Iowa Hawkeyes of the Big Ten Conference defeated the No. 10 Oregon State Beavers of the Pacific Coast Conference by a score of 35–19, in a rematch of a regular season contest in early October at Iowa City, where the home team rallied to win, 14–13.

Iowa quarterback Ken Ploen was named the Player of the Game.

This was the first trip to Pasadena for both teams: it was Iowa's first bowl appearance and Oregon State's second. The Beavers won the Rose Bowl fifteen years earlier in January 1942, which was moved to Durham, North Carolina.

== Game summary ==
Ploen completed nine of ten passes and rushed for 59 yards, including a 49-yard run for Iowa's first score. Collins Hagler scored twice for the Hawkeyes, the second on a 66-yard run. For Oregon State, Joe Francis ran for 73 yards and was ten of twelve passing for 73 yards and a touchdown. The Beavers were hurt by three fumbles, two in the first seven minutes, and both led to Iowa touchdowns. The Hawkeyes led 21–6 at halftime and were up by 23 points early in the fourth quarter. OSC closed the margin to sixteen points with under ten minutes remaining, but that was the last of the scoring and Iowa won 35–19.

=== Scoring ===
==== First quarter ====
- Iowa – Ken Ploen 49-yard run (Bob Prescott kick), 10:44 remaining, (Iowa 7–0)
- Iowa – Collins Hagler 9-yard run (Prescott kick), 7:20, (Iowa, 14–0)

==== Second quarter ====
- OSC – Tom Berry 3-yard run (kick blocked), 14:48, (Iowa, 14–6)
- Iowa – Bill Happel 5-yard run (Prescott kick), 3:23, (Iowa, 21–6)

==== Third quarter ====
- Iowa – Collins Hagler 66-yard run (Prescott kick), 12:29, (Iowa, 28–6)
- OSC – Nub Beamer 1-yard run (kick blocked), 5:20, (Iowa, 28–12)

==== Fourth quarter ====
- Iowa – Jim Gibbons 16-yard pass from Ken Ploen (Prescott kick), 14:47, (Iowa 35–12)
- OSC – Sterling Hammack 35-yard pass from Joe Francis (Beamer run), 9:41, (Iowa 35–19)

== See also ==
- List of college football post-season games that were rematches of regular season games
