= 1957 Michigan State Spartans football team =

American college football season

1957 Michigan State Spartans football

National champion (Dunkel)
- Conference: Big Ten Conference

Ranking
- Coaches: No. 3
- AP: No. 3
- Record: 8–1 (5–1 Big Ten)
- Head coach: Duffy Daugherty (4th season)
- MVP: Dan Currie
- Captain: Patrick F. Burke
- Home stadium: Spartan Stadium

1957 Big Ten Conference football standings
	Conf.					Overall
Team	W		L		T	W		L		T
No. 2 Ohio State $	7	–	0	–	0	9	–	1	–	0
No. 3 Michigan State	5	–	1	–	0	8	–	1	–	0
No. 6 Iowa	4	–	1	–	1	7	–	1	–	1
No. 19 Wisconsin	4	–	3	–	0	6	–	3	–	0
Purdue	4	–	3	–	0	5	–	4	–	0
Michigan	3	–	3	–	1	5	–	3	–	1
Illinois	3	–	4	–	0	4	–	5	–	0
Minnesota	3	–	5	–	0	4	–	5	–	0
Indiana	0	–	6	–	0	1	–	8	–	0
Northwestern	0	–	7	–	0	0	–	9	–	0
$ – Conference champion; Rankings from AP Poll

The 1957 Michigan State Spartans football team was an American football team that represented Michigan State University in the 1957 Big Ten Conference football season. In their fourth season under head coach Duffy Daugherty, the Spartans compiled an 8–1 record (5–1 in conference games), outscored opponents by a total of 264 to 75, finished in second place in the Big Ten Conference, and were ranked No. 3 in both the final AP and UPI polls. Michigan State was named national champion by Dunkel System, an NCAA-designated major selector.

The 1957 Spartans won all three of their annual rivalry games, defeating Indiana (54–0), Notre Dame (34–6), and Michigan (35–6). In non-conference play, the Spartans also defeated California (19–0) and Kansas State (27–9).

The Spartans gained averaged 263.0 rushing yards and 120.9 passing yards per game, while holding opponents to 117.2 rushing yards and 74.3 passing yards per game. The team's individual statistical leaders included:

- Quarterback Jim Ninowski completed 45 of 79 passes (57.0%) for 718 yards with six touchdowns, three interceptions, and a 150.8 quarterback rating.
- Fullback Walt Kowalczyk rushed for 545 yards on 101 carries (5.4 yards per carry) and scored nine rushing touchdowns.
- Dave Kaiser caught 19 passes for 267 yards.

Six Spartans were selected as first-team players on the 1957 All-Big Ten Conference football team: Ninowski (AP-1, UP-1); Kowalczyk (AP-1, UP-1); center Dan Currie (AP-1, UP-1); tackle Pat Burke (AP-1, UP-1); end Sam Williams (UP-1); and guard Ellison Kelly (UP-1).

== Schedule ==
Date	Opponent	Rank	Site	Result	Attendance	Source
September 28	Indiana	No. 4	Spartan Stadium; East Lansing, MI (rivalry)	W 54–0	52,162	
October 5	at California*	No. 2	California Memorial Stadium; Berkeley, CA	W 19–0	40,000	
October 12	at No. 6 Michigan	No. 2	Michigan Stadium; Ann Arbor, MI (rivalry)	W 35–6	101,001	
October 19	Purdue	No. 1	Spartan Stadium; East Lansing, MI	L 13–20	64,950	
October 26	No. 16 Illinois^{†}	No. 8	Spartan Stadium; East Lansing, MI	W 19–14	64,353	
November 2	at Wisconsin	No. 6	Camp Randall Stadium; Madison, WI	W 21–7	49,826	
November 9	No. 15 Notre Dame*	No. 4	Spartan Stadium; East Lansing, MI (rivalry)	W 34–6	75,391	
November 16	Minnesota	No. 4	Spartan Stadium; East Lansing, MI	W 42–13	65,718	
November 23	Kansas State*	No. 1	Spartan Stadium; East Lansing, MI	W 27–9	35,989	
*Non-conference game; ^{†}Homecoming; Rankings from AP Poll released prior to the game
