= Forest Evashevski =

American football player, coach, and administrator (1918–2009)

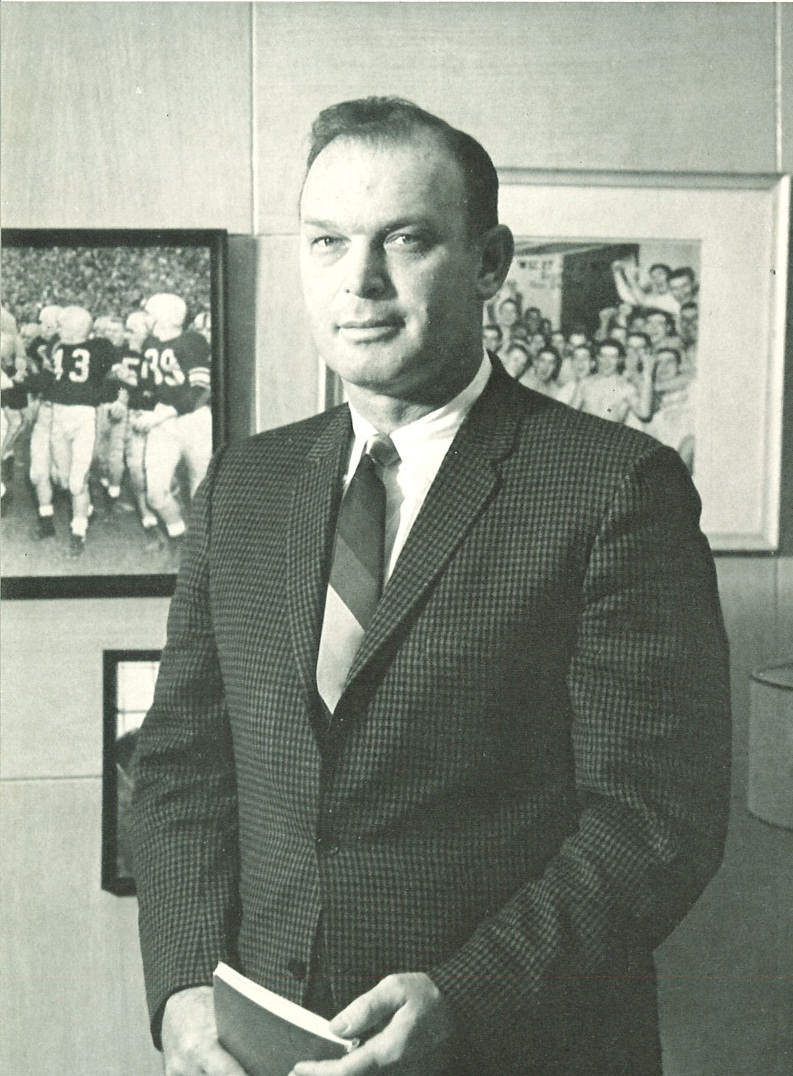
- Evashevski from 1965 Hawkeye

Biographical details
- Born: February 18, 1918; Detroit, Michigan, U.S.
- Died: October 30, 2009 (aged 91); Petoskey, Michigan, U.S.

Playing career
- 1938–1940: Michigan
- 1942: Iowa Pre-Flight
- Position: Quarterback

Coaching career (HC unless noted)
- 1941: Hamilton
- 1942: Pittsburgh (assistant)
- 1946: Syracuse (assistant)
- 1947–1949: Michigan State (assistant)
- 1950–1951: Washington State
- 1952–1960: Iowa

Administrative career (AD unless noted)
- 1960–1970: Iowa

Head coaching record
- Overall: 68–35–6
- Bowls: 2–0

Accomplishments and honors

Championships
- National (FWAA, 1958); 3 Big Ten (1956, 1958, 1960)

Awards
- 2× First-team All-Big Ten (1938, 1940); Second-team All-Big Ten (1939)
- College Football Hall of Fame; Inducted in 2000 (profile)

Forest "Evy" Evashevski (February 19, 1918 – October 30, 2009) was an American football player, coach, and college athletics administrator. He played college football at the University of Michigan from 1938 to 1940 and with the Iowa Pre-Flight Seahawks in 1942.

Evashevski served as the head football coach at Hamilton College in 1941, Washington State College from 1950 to 1951, and the University of Iowa from 1952 to 1960, compiling a career record of 68–35–6. Evashevski's 1958 Iowa team went 8–1–1, won the Big Ten Conference title and defeated the California Golden Bears in the Rose Bowl. Though they finished second to the LSU Tigers in both major pre-bowl game polls, the 1958 Hawkeyes were recognized by the Football Writers Association of America as national champions after all the bowl games had been played. Evashevski served as Iowa's athletic director from 1960 to 1970, and was inducted into the College Football Hall of Fame as a coach in 2000.

== Early years ==
Evashevski was born in Detroit, Michigan. In grade school, he captained the basketball, baseball, soccer, and track teams. At Northwestern High School, however, he was not allowed on the football practice field in his sophomore or junior years. The school's varsity football coaches felt that Evashevski was too small at just 128 pounds. So he played intramural football at Northwestern. As a senior, he had grown to 180 pounds and his intramural football squad scrimmaged against the varsity football team. Evashevski led his intramural team to an upset of the varsity squad, and the coaches let him join the team.

Evashevski started at tackle and linebacker as a 16-year-old Northwestern High School senior; he was allowed to skip a few grades in grade school to help him maintain interest academically. After his first varsity football game, a writer from The Detroit News said he was a sure-fire all-state pick, if he could stay healthy. But Evashevski suffered from headaches and vomiting after the game. In his next game, he hit a punt returner, forcing a fumble. Evashevski was knocked out cold and spent the next several months in the hospital. He said, "In the second game, I suffered a cerebral hemorrhage. They did three spinal taps on me before they decided to operate. I was supposed to be through with football. But when something is taken away from you like that, I believe you want it even more than you did before."

== Playing career ==
Eighteen months later, Evy enrolled at the University of Michigan. Michigan football coach Fritz Crisler wanted Evashevski on the field, so Evy was moved from the center position to quarterback one week before his first varsity game. In Crisler's single-wing system, the quarterback position required mostly calling signals and blocking for the running back, and Evashevski had the blocking skills and intelligence necessary to become a star. He started and was an all-Big Ten Conference performer three straight seasons. He played from 1938 to 1940 and paved the way for halfback Tom Harmon, who won the Heisman Trophy in 1940. Evashevski also played in the same Michigan backfield with David M. Nelson, a fellow alumnus of Northwestern High. Nelson would go on to a noteworthy coaching career; among his many contributions was the wing-T formation.

Harmon said, "Evy seemed to think right with Crisler...[A]s a linebacker, he had a fantastic instinct for smelling out the play...As a blocker, I never saw a better one." Although Harmon won the Heisman, Evashevski was the team's captain. Evashevski was also the most dynamic personality on the team. Once, Crisler's Wolverines were leading a foe 21–0 at half. He feared a letdown, so he ordered his team to consider the game scoreless. Crisler then asked, "OK, Evy, what's the score?" Evashevski replied, "You can't kid me, coach. The score is 21–0." On another occasion, Evashevski shocked both his coach and teammates by lighting a victory cigar on the sidelines with thirty seconds to play in a 1939 win over Ohio State.

Before a game against Minnesota, Crisler implored his team in a pregame speech to be 11 lions on offense and 11 tigers on defense. Evashevski spoke up and said he would not play unless he could be a leopard. On another day, Crisler, who demanded punctuality of his players, arrived for practice a little late. "Fritz", Evashevski barked, daring to use Crisler's nickname, "we begin practice at 3:30. It's now 3:35. Take a lap around the field"; Crisler did. He was named to the 1939 College Football All Polish-American Team.

The Wolverines were 20–4 from 1938 to 1940. Crisler later called Evashevski "the greatest quarterback I ever had." Evashevski won the Big Ten Medal given to the school's best senior student-athlete. He was the baseball catcher, the senior class president, and an honor society member. Evashevski graduated with a sociology major and a psychology minor. He wanted to take labor law at the University of Michigan Law School, but his plans were interrupted with the outbreak of World War II and the Americans entering the War.

== Military service and early coaching career ==
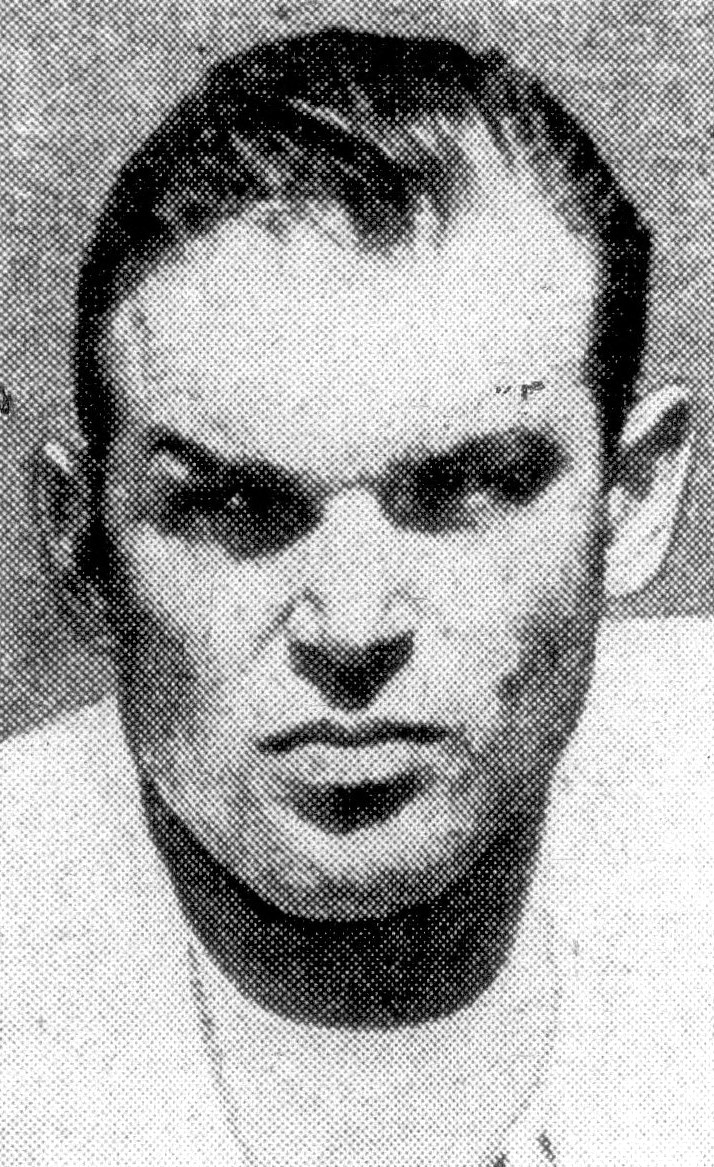
Evashevski, circa 1950

Evashevski coached Hamilton College to a 5–2 record in 1941 and served as an assistant coach for spring football at the University of Pittsburgh in 1942. Evashevski then enrolled at the Iowa Naval Pre-Flight School in Iowa City, teaching the students hand-to-hand combat and playing for the Pre-Flight Seahawks in 1942. Then he left to serve three years in the military from 1943 to 1945. When he returned from the military, Evashevski went back to Ann Arbor to try to enroll at Michigan's law school. Evashevski and his wife could not find a room because of all the military veterans returning from the war.

When Biggie Munn, Crisler's line coach at Michigan and then head football coach at Syracuse University, offered Evashevski an assistant coaching job in 1946, Evashevski took it. He followed Munn to Michigan State University one year later and served as his assistant coach there from 1947 to 1949. In 1950, Evashevski accepted a head coaching job out west in the Pacific Coast Conference (PCC) at Washington State College in Pullman. He compiled a 4–3–2 record in 1950, and improved to 7–3 in 1951, the Cougars' best record in two decades.

== Head coach at Iowa ==
"People in the Midwest are my people and I wanted to be back among them...And, of course, I don't have to tell you what I think of Big Ten football. It's the best in the country." With those words, Evashevski left the Palouse in southeastern Washington to become the University of Iowa's 19th head football coach.

Evashevski nearly took the head coaching job at Indiana University, but Fritz Crisler urged him to consider Iowa. He felt that it would be easier to attain statewide support at Iowa than in Indiana, where Purdue University and the University of Notre Dame shared the spotlight. Evashevski was familiar with Iowa City from his stint with the Naval Pre-Flight School. Crisler was the man who recommended Evashevski to Iowa's athletic director, Paul Brechler. Crisler did warn Brechler, however, that Evashevski was "a tough, stubborn Polack, and you might have to put the reins on him."

In 1952, Iowa football had only had three winning seasons in the previous 16 years. Iowa had also gone without a Big Ten Conference title for three decades. A United Press story named three football programs in 1952 with new coaches that would struggle to ever be competitive: Iowa, Indiana, and Pittsburgh. Iowa's first two opponents in 1952 were Pittsburgh and Indiana, and Iowa lost to both, but Evashevski knew the Hawkeye program could be resurrected. When he came to Iowa, Evashevski was asked by a writer, "Do you think Iowa could ever really have a consistently winning team?" Evashevski snapped, "Why in the hell do you think I took the job?" Afterwards, a photographer noted, "I think that man truly believes he's the savior of Iowa football."

=== Early years (1952–1955) ===
The Hawkeyes struggled to an 0–4 start in 1952, surrendering more than 32 points per game during that stretch. Iowa was scheduled to play Ohio State for homecoming, and Evashevski's Hawks were three-touchdown underdogs. Ohio State had never played in Iowa Stadium, having not played in Iowa City in a quarter century. Evashevski completely retooled his offense the week before the game, and Iowa shocked the Buckeyes, 8–0. The Des Moines Register wrote, "Put your license plate back on the family auto, citizen, for Iowa won a football game Saturday." Register sports editor Sec Taylor added, "It was like my 8-year-old granddaughter out-boxing Sugar Ray Robinson." The Associated Press (AP), in a year-end poll, voted it the third biggest upset of the year.

Before the season, Evashevski had warned the school administration to expect some eyebrow-raising behavior from him. He strongly believed that the team had to be instilled with a fighting attitude, and that the Big Ten needed to be made aware of Iowa's presence in the league. In a loss to Minnesota, Gopher fans on the sideline yelled at Iowa coaches and players to stop obstructing their view. Words were exchanged, and several men wound up charging Evashevski, with one fan taking a swing at Evashevski and missing.

The following week against Illinois, a very physical game turned dirty in the fourth quarter. More than one brawl cleared both benches, and players from both sides were ejected from the game. Evashevski stormed on to the field to protest a call, which fired up the Iowa crowd. When an official tried to mark off an Illinois penalty against Iowa, the Hawkeye crowd started throwing apple cores at the officials. After the game, as the Illinois team was trying to leave the field, an Illinois player got into an argument with an Iowa student and punched him, breaking his jaw. Several Illinois players and ten Iowa players were hurt during the game, with four being sent to the hospital. This incident led to a suspension of the Iowa–Illinois series for 15 years.

Iowa improved in 1953, starting the season with a 3–3 record. Iowa then defeated Purdue, 26–0, and Minnesota, 27–0, in consecutive weeks to set up the most controversial game in school history. The final game of the season was against #1 Notre Dame in South Bend. Notre Dame was a 13-point favorite. In fact, not only was Notre Dame the top-ranked team in the nation, the AP writers had voted the Irish number one by the largest margin in their poll's history. With just seconds remaining in the first half and Iowa holding a 7–0 lead, Notre Dame was stopped for no gain on Iowa's seven-yard line. A tackle for the Irish screamed and fell to the ground, and the clock was stopped for the injury with just two seconds remaining. The Irish broke huddle and the officials signaled for the clock to start. Notre Dame was able to set down the lines, call signals, and snap the ball before time expired, and Notre Dame completed a touchdown pass on the final play of the half. The game was tied at halftime, 7–7. Iowa scored another touchdown with two minutes remaining in the game. With just 32 seconds left on the clock, Notre Dame advanced the ball to the Iowa 19-yard line. But the clock was running, and Notre Dame had no timeouts remaining Again, an injury timeout was granted, but this time, two Notre Dame players fell at the same time, apparently unaware of the other. Both players left the field unassisted, and Notre Dame quickly resumed their drive. With six seconds to play, Notre Dame completed another touchdown pass and salvaged a 14–14 tie.

Iowa sportscaster Bob Brooks said, "In retrospect, faking an injury was common in those days. That's what teams did, anything to get a timeout. However, it was abnormal in that Frank Leahy, the Notre Dame coach, had the Irish fainting all over the place. Players went down like they were shot." Critics labeled Notre Dame the "Fainting Irish", and while there was no official rule against faking injuries, many critics questioned the practice. When Notre Dame star Johnny Lattner was asked about it, he responded, "Pretty smart thinking, wasn't it?"

Famed sportswriter Grantland Rice stated, "I consider it a complete violation of the spirit and ethics of the game and was sorry to see Notre Dame, of all teams, using this method. Why, in heaven's name, was it allowed? If this violates neither the rules nor the coaching code, let's throw them both out the window. Some people are calling it smart playing. I think it was disgraceful playing."

Evashevski attended a pep rally when he returned to Iowa City, and he parodied Rice himself when he said, "When the One Great Scorer comes to write against our name, He won't write whether we won or lost, but how come we got gypped at Notre Dame." Evashevski said, "Don't celebrate a tie; celebrate a victory. I was there Saturday, and if ever a team won a game, Iowa won a victory at Notre Dame Saturday." School officials eventually ordered Evashevski to apologize for his remarks. The tie cost the Irish the #1 spot in the final AP Poll, dropping them to a distant #2. Iowa rocketed into the AP rankings, finishing the year ninth in the nation and garnering six first place votes. It was Iowa's highest ranking since 1939, and the tie gave the Iowa program national attention. The Hawkeyes started the 1954 season 5–2, but Iowa suffered two tough losses to end the season at 5–4. In 1955, the Hawkeyes finished a disappointing 3–5–1, but lineman Cal Jones won the Outland Trophy at the end of the season.

=== Rose Bowl years (1956–1958) ===
In 1956, Iowa opened with five wins, but Michigan scored a touchdown with 66 seconds remaining to upset the Hawkeyes, 17–14. Evashevski dropped to 0–4 at Iowa against his alma mater, but if Iowa could win their next two football games, they would go to the Rose Bowl. Minnesota was Iowa's next opponent, and the Gophers were in the lead in the Rose Bowl race.

Rather than a pregame speech, Evashevski used a pregame altercation to fire up his Hawkeye team. The Iowa team filed off the team bus outside Minnesota's stadium and huddled together, shivering in the cold. Evashevski was the last man off the bus and, as he walked over to the gate, he was scolded by the gatekeeper. "You know better than this!...[Y]ou were given tickets, and you can't get in without them!", the gatekeeper said. Evashevski, who had his hand on the team's passes and was about to produce them, saw an opportunity. He shoved the passes back into his pocket and engaged in a verbal battle with the gatekeeper, as his cold and angry Hawkeye team watched. Finally, the gatekeeper let the team pass, but he detained the coaches. The players were in the locker room, not knowing where the coaches were, until Evashevski and his assistants filed in moments before kickoff. The Hawkeyes took out their frustration on the Gopher team. The Hawks scored a touchdown off a turnover just a few minutes into the game. Iowa forced six fumbles and three interceptions from Minnesota and won, 7–0.

Iowa then faced Ohio State for the Big Ten title. Led by head coach Woody Hayes, the Buckeyes had just defeated Indiana by rushing for 465 yards as a team, setting a Big Ten Conference record. The win over the Hoosiers was Ohio State's 17th consecutive conference win, also a Big Ten record. With a win over Iowa, the Buckeyes would clinch a third consecutive outright Big Ten title. Iowa, on the other hand, was playing for their first Big Ten title in 34 years.

A sign in Iowa's locker room said, "You have sixty minutes to defeat Ohio State, and a lifetime to remember it." In one of the most hard-hitting and memorable games in Iowa history, Iowa defeated Ohio State, 6–0, to clinch Iowa's first Rose Bowl trip in school history. Following a scoreless first half, Iowa took the lead on a 17-yard touchdown pass from quarterback Ken Ploen to receiver Jim Gibbons. The Hawks then allowed Ohio State just 53 yards total offense in the second half to punch home the win. The game was so exciting, University of Iowa president Virgil Hancher had to be hospitalized with an apparent heart attack.

After a forty-point win over Notre Dame, which stands as one of the worst losses in the history of the Irish, the Hawkeyes prepared for the Rose Bowl. Such a happy occasion was marred, however, by the tragic news that former Hawkeye Cal Jones had just died in a plane crash in Canada. One week later, the Hawkeyes flew to Pasadena, California. The team quietly dedicated the game to Jones' memory and defeated Oregon State, 35–19. Ploen was named the Rose Bowl MVP. The Hawks sent the game ball to Jones' mother in Steubenville, Ohio.

Iowa was nearly as good in 1957 as they had been the previous season. Iowa again opened with five wins before traveling to Ann Arbor to play Michigan. This time, the Hawkeyes fell behind by two touchdowns and trailed at halftime, 21–7. Iowa rallied with two unanswered touchdowns and tied the game at 21. With three minutes to go, the Hawks regained possession of the ball; Iowa ran out the clock and settled for the tie. Quarterback Randy Duncan had left the game with leg cramps, crippling Iowa's offense. Evashevski calmly explained that a tie did not hurt Iowa's Big Ten title chances, while it all but ended Michigan's. Time magazine published a story in which they called the Hawkeyes "quitters". The tie set up another showdown for the Big Ten title with Ohio State. However, unlike the previous season, the Buckeyes got revenge this time and handed Iowa a 17–13 defeat. It was Iowa's only loss of the year, as the Hawkeyes finished with a 7–1–1 record and ranked sixth in the nation.

The 1958 Hawkeyes played Air Force to a surprising 13–13 tie. The United States Air Force Academy had only existed since 1954, and few thought their football team would give Iowa's a challenge. But Air Force salvaged a tie and finished the regular season with a 9–0–1 record. The tie gave the Hawkeye players a lesson in humility, and they illustrated that they had learned their lesson by winning five straight conference games, clinching the Big Ten title earlier than any team in conference history. The most notable win was a 37–14 defeat of Michigan, Evashevski's first and only win over his alma mater. For the first time, the Hawkeye team was able to force their coach to accept the game ball.

A week after Iowa clinched the league crown, Ohio State spoiled Iowa's undefeated record with a 38–28 win in a terrific contest. Iowa went back to the Rose Bowl and clobbered California, 38–12. The Hawkeyes set or tied six Rose Bowl records in that game. Running back Bob Jeter rushed for a Rose Bowl record 194 yards on just nine carries, including an 81-yard touchdown run, another Rose Bowl record. Jeter was the game's MVP. Evashevski, who had battled the flu and a 101 °F (38 °C) temperature the week of the game, could barely give the halftime speech.

Iowa finished the year ranked #2 in the AP Poll, behind 11–0 LSU, although that vote was taken before the bowl games. The Football Writers Association of America (FWAA), arguably the most prestigious organization at the time to vote on a national champion after the bowls were played, gave their national championship trophy, the Grantland Rice Award, to Iowa.

During the offseason, Evashevski applied and interviewed for the job of head coach and general manager of the Green Bay Packers, and many Green Bay sources indicated that Evashevski was nearly offered the job, but he withdrew his application at the last minute for unspecified reasons. The Packers would then end up hiring Vince Lombardi as their new head coach.

=== Feud with Brechler (1959–1960) ===
Iowa went 5–4 in 1959, a season marred by a very public feud between Evashevski and Brechler. Crisler had warned Brechler about Evashevski's stubbornness before Evashevski was hired. Brechler and Evashevski were both reportedly very good at their respective jobs, but relations between the two men quickly deteriorated. Evashevski and Brechler had a long and often bitter feud in the late 1950s. Evashevski called the conflict "[a] complete destruction of confidence in each other". At the end of the 1959 season, Brechler announced that he was leaving Iowa to become the commissioner of the Skyline Conference, the forerunner to the Western Athletic Conference.

Evashevski had repeatedly mentioned that he did not intend to grow old in coaching. After the 1957 season, he conceded that his health was not the best and that "my wife has wanted me to get out of coaching for some time". Evashevski clearly wanted the athletic director job. Members on the Board of Athletics, however, were concerned about the prospect of the ambitious Evashevski holding both positions. The Board told Evashevski that he could take either job: head football coach or athletic director. Evashevski chose to become Iowa's athletic director and promised to appoint a new football coach after the 1960 season.

Evashevski's final season as football coach at Iowa was another memorable one. The 1960 team overcame a fierce schedule and finished the year 8–1. The Hawkeyes defeated Ohio State in the last game of the conference season to clinch a share of the league crown with Minnesota. It was Evashevski's third Big Ten title at Iowa. The Hawkeyes were ranked third in the final AP Poll, which was taken before the bowl games. Iowa's only loss that season was at Minnesota, which finished first in the final AP Poll with an identical 8–1 record. During his tenure, Evashevski compiled a 52–27–4 record. His teams won three Big Ten titles and two Rose Bowls, and finished in the top ten of the final AP Poll five times. Though he had been a head coach for only 12 years in total, Evashevski was inducted into the Iowa Sports Hall of Fame in 1989 and the College Football Hall of Fame in 2000.

== Athletic director at Iowa ==
Evashevski succeeded Brechler as Iowa's athletic director in 1960. He hired his assistant coach, Jerry Burns, to replace him as head football coach. Iowa began the 1961 season ranked first in the initial AP Poll but staggered to a disappointing 5–4 record. A defeat of Notre Dame on the final game of the season gave Iowa a winning record for the year; it would be Iowa's last winning season for the next 20 years. Three sub-par seasons put Burns on the hot seat entering 1965, but the 1965 team was predicted to do well. Instead, Iowa finished the year 1–9, and Burns was fired by his former mentor Evashevski. Burns went on to a long and successful coaching career in professional football, serving as an assistant to Vince Lombardi with the Green Bay Packers, which won the first two Super Bowls, and then as offensive coordinator for 18 seasons with the Minnesota Vikings under Bud Grant, when Minnesota went to four Super Bowls between 1969 and 1976. Burns was head coach of the Vikings from 1986 to 1991, posting a 53–42 mark and three playoff appearances.

There are those who insist that Evashevski wanted to be called back as football coach and that rather than helping Burns to succeed, he hampered him with rules and regulations that were not in force when Evashevski was the coach. When Evashevski was in his final year as coach in 1960, Look magazine wrote, "Close friends are not at all sure (Evy) will quit. They feel he is not sure himself."

One of Burns' assistant coaches said, "From the moment he became athletic director, Evy cut down the cost of maintaining the football program to the bare bones. He cut down on traveling expenses for recruiting, phone calls, entertainment of prospective recruits, you name it. When Evy was coach, we took visiting recruits and their parents to fine restaurants to eat. After Evy became the athletic director, the staff was told that visiting recruits and their parents would eat at the Quadrangle cafeteria. We were told if we recruited in Chicago one week, we were not to go back the next. The football players knew Jerry couldn't make it because of Evy's attitude towards him. It was a very antagonistic situation right from the start that got worse through the years."

Evashevski, for his part, denied the charges and continued to maintain that he never intended to grow old in coaching. However, despite his public statements, rumors swirled that Evashevski would appoint himself to succeed Burns. Evashevski hired Ray Nagel from the University of Utah, although Nagel's record at Utah was not stellar. Some speculated at the time that finding a new coach had been difficult due to the problems Burns reportedly experienced with Evashevski. The Cedar Rapids Gazette reported, "At least four coaches either turned down the Hawkeye job or expressed no desire to talk about it."

Nagel's hiring was questioned even more after he had a 3–16–1 record in 1966 and 1967 at Iowa. However, the Hawkeyes set several school and conference offensive records in 1968 and finished with a 5–5 record. A boycott by several black players at Iowa in 1969 hurt the Hawkeye football squad and was a factor in their 5–5 record that season.

Friction between Nagel and Evashevski began to take public effect in January 1970 when Nagel dismissed offensive line coach Gary Grouwinkel for "disloyalty", which Grouwinkel later revealed was his allegiance to Evashevski instead of Nagel. Less than one month later, star quarterback Larry Lawrence and fullback Tom Smith quit the team and transferred to Miami, loudly proclaiming that they would never stay and play for Nagel. About two weeks later, Lawrence's roommate, a non-athlete, submitted to the Iowa Board of Athletics a written statement charging Evashevski with participating in a rebellion aimed at getting Nagel fired and that would allow Evashevski to succeed him as head football coach. Lawrence's roommate stated that Lawrence was recruited to gather player support for Nagel's removal, but that Lawrence's efforts were unproductive. Evashevski vehemently denied the charges, and Iowa's athletic board took no action.

In May 1970, the State Auditor of Iowa announced that the athletic department was under investigation for "padded expense accounts". Nagel not only denied wrongdoing, but claimed that they were shown how to fill out their expense accounts by Evashevski himself. Charges and counter-charges followed, and after a long investigation the Iowa Board of Athletics relieved both Forest Evashevski and Ray Nagel of their respective duties on May 19. Nagel was rehired a few days later, but Evashevski was replaced as athletic director at Iowa by Bump Elliott. The news headlines reported Evashevski as resigning and Nagel as being fired.

The Iowa Attorney General submitted a report to the Iowa Board of Athletics that stated, in part, "Mr. Evashevski's attitudes and other things he has done all tend to support the view of Coach Nagel and four of his five assistants that this is part of a vendetta against him...[Evashevski] did the university and people of Iowa, many of whom have almost worshiped him, a great disservice." The Attorney General never interviewed Evashevski while investigating the issue.

== Personal life ==
Evashevski retired at a relatively young age. He was only 42 when he retired from coaching and just 52 when he was fired as Iowa's athletic director. He briefly worked as a color analyst on ABC's college football coverage before moving back to northern Michigan.

It was announced in mid-October 2009 that the 91-year-old Evashevski was battling cancer that had spread to his liver. He died on October 30, 2009. He was survived by his wife Ruth, seven children, 14 grandchildren, and five great-grandchildren. His youngest daughter, Kassie, is a literary agent in Los Angeles.

During the game following Evashevski's death, Iowa paid tribute to the old coach by wearing a small sticker on their helmets that read "EVY", Evashevski's nickname.

Evashevski was also a bridge player, appearing on the television program Championship Bridge with Charles Goren.

== Head coaching record ==
Year	Team	Overall	Conference	Standing	Bowl/playoffs	Coaches^{#}	AP^{°}
Hamilton Continentals (Independent) (1941)
1941	Hamilton	5–2					
Hamilton:		5–2					
Washington State Cougars (Pacific Coast Conference) (1950–1951)
1950	Washington State	4–3–2	2–3–2	6th			
1951	Washington State	7–3	4–3	5th		14	18
Washington State:		11–6–2	6–6–2				
Iowa Hawkeyes (Big Ten Conference) (1952–1960)
1952	Iowa	2–7	2–5	T–6th			
1953	Iowa	5–3–1	3–3	T–5th		10	9
1954	Iowa	5–4	4–3	5th			
1955	Iowa	3–5–1	2–3–1	7th		19	
1956	Iowa	9–1	5–1	1st	W Rose	3	3
1957	Iowa	7–1–1	4–1–1	3rd		5	6
1958	Iowa	8–1–1	5–1	1st	W Rose	2	2
1959	Iowa	5–4	3–3	6th			
1960	Iowa	8–1	5–1	T–1st		2	3
Iowa:		52–27–4	33–21–2				
Total:		68–35–6					
National championship Conference title Conference division title or championship game berth
^{#}Rankings from final Coaches Poll.; ^{°}Rankings from final AP Poll.

== See also ==
- University of Michigan Athletic Hall of Honor
