= 1957 Purdue Boilermakers football team =

American college football season

1957 Purdue Boilermakers football
- Conference: Big Ten Conference
- Record: 5–4 (4–3 Big Ten)
- Head coach: Jack Mollenkopf (2nd season)
- MVP: Neil Habig
- Captains: Mel Dillard; Neil Habig
- Home stadium: Ross–Ade Stadium

1957 Big Ten Conference football standings
	Conf.					Overall
Team	W		L		T	W		L		T
No. 2 Ohio State $	7	–	0	–	0	9	–	1	–	0
No. 3 Michigan State	5	–	1	–	0	8	–	1	–	0
No. 6 Iowa	4	–	1	–	1	7	–	1	–	1
No. 19 Wisconsin	4	–	3	–	0	6	–	3	–	0
Purdue	4	–	3	–	0	5	–	4	–	0
Michigan	3	–	3	–	1	5	–	3	–	1
Illinois	3	–	4	–	0	4	–	5	–	0
Minnesota	3	–	5	–	0	4	–	5	–	0
Indiana	0	–	6	–	0	1	–	8	–	0
Northwestern	0	–	7	–	0	0	–	9	–	0
$ – Conference champion; Rankings from AP Poll

The 1957 Purdue Boilermakers football team was an American football team that represented Purdue University during the 1957 Big Ten Conference football season. In their second season under head coach Jack Mollenkopf, the Boilermakers compiled a 5–4 record, finished in a tie for fourth place in the Big Ten Conference with a 4–3 record against conference opponents, and outscored all opponents by a total of 178 to 114.

Notable players included quarterbacks Bob Spoo and Ross Fichtner and tackle Nick Mumley.

== Schedule ==
Date	Opponent	Site	Result	Attendance	Source
September 28	Notre Dame*	Ross–Ade Stadium; West Lafayette, IN (rivalry)	L 0–12	52,108	
October 5	at No. 3 Minnesota	Memorial Stadium; Minneapolis, MN	L 17–21	65,605	
October 12	No. 16 Wisconsin^{†}	Ross–Ade Stadium; West Lafayette, IN	L 14–23	40,507	
October 19	at No. 1 Michigan State	Spartan Stadium; East Lansing, MI	W 20–13	64,950	
October 26	Miami (OH)*	Ross–Ade Stadium; West Lafayette, IN	W 37–6	35,655	
November 2	at Illinois	Memorial Stadium; Champaign, IL (rivalry)	W 21–6	47,690	
November 9	at No. 6 Ohio State	Ohio Stadium; Columbus, OH	L 7–20	79,177	
November 16	Northwestern	Ross–Ade Stadium; West Lafayette, IN	W 27–0	32,507	
November 23	at Indiana	Memorial Stadium; Bloomington, IN (Old Oaken Bucket)	W 35–13	27,000	
*Non-conference game; ^{†}Homecoming; Rankings from AP Poll released prior to the game; Source:

== Roster ==
- Bill Alford, RB
- Francis Anastasia, WR
- Al Bader, RB
- Erich Barnes, WR
- Tom Barnett, RB
- Dick Brooks, WR
- John Crowl, WR
- Melvin Dillard, RB
- Ed Dwyer, OL
- Wayne Farmer, OL
- Larry Ferguson, WR
- Ross Fichtner, QB
- Tom Fletcher, RB
- Tom Franckhauser, WR
- Neil Habig, OL
- John Jardine, OL
- Len Jardine, WR
- Bob Jarus, RB
- Wayne Jones, RB
- Joe Kulbacki, RB
- Jack Laraway, RB
- Kenneth Mikes, RB
- Nick Mumley, OL
- Jim Redinger, RB
- Ron Sabal, OL
- Charles Schelsky, QB
- Gene Selawski, OL
- Bob Spoo, QB
- Dick Stillwagon, RB
- Doug Streff, QB
- Clyde Washington, RB
- Len Wilson, RB
