= 1957 Northwestern Wildcats football team =

American college football season

1957 Northwestern Wildcats football
- Conference: Big Ten Conference
- Record: 0–9 (0–7 Big Ten)
- Head coach: Ara Parseghian (2nd season)
- MVP: Willmer Fowler
- Captains: Bob McKeiver; Al Viola
- Home stadium: Dyche Stadium

1957 Big Ten Conference football standings
	Conf.					Overall
Team	W		L		T	W		L		T
No. 2 Ohio State $	7	–	0	–	0	9	–	1	–	0
No. 3 Michigan State	5	–	1	–	0	8	–	1	–	0
No. 6 Iowa	4	–	1	–	1	7	–	1	–	1
No. 19 Wisconsin	4	–	3	–	0	6	–	3	–	0
Purdue	4	–	3	–	0	5	–	4	–	0
Michigan	3	–	3	–	1	5	–	3	–	1
Illinois	3	–	4	–	0	4	–	5	–	0
Minnesota	3	–	5	–	0	4	–	5	–	0
Indiana	0	–	6	–	0	1	–	8	–	0
Northwestern	0	–	7	–	0	0	–	9	–	0
$ – Conference champion; Rankings from AP Poll

The 1957 Northwestern Wildcats team represented Northwestern University during the 1957 Big Ten Conference football season. In their second year under head coach Ara Parseghian, the Wildcats compiled a 0–9 record (0–7 against Big Ten Conference opponents), finished in last place in the Big Ten, and were outscored by their opponents by a combined total of 271 to 57.

== Schedule ==
Date	Opponent	Site	Result	Attendance	Source
September 28	at No. 16 Stanford*	Stanford Stadium; Stanford, CA	L 6–26	19,000	
October 5	No. 9 Oregon State*	Dyche Stadium; Evanston, IL	L 13–22	34,500	
October 12	No. 4 Minnesota	Dyche Stadium; Evanston, IL	L 6–41	38,000	
October 19	at No. 18 Michigan	Michigan Stadium; Ann Arbor, MI (rivalry)	L 14–34	70,884	
October 26	No. 3 Iowa	Dyche Stadium; Evanston, IL	L 0–6	42,719	
November 2	at No. 8 Ohio State	Ohio Stadium; Columbus, OH	L 6–47	79,635	
November 9	Wisconsin	Dyche Stadium; Evanston, IL	L 12–41	32,250	
November 16	at Purdue	Ross–Ade Stadium; West Lafayette, IN	L 0–27	32,507	
November 23	at Illinois	Memorial Stadium; Champaign, IL (rivalry)	L 0–27	27,017	
*Non-conference game; Rankings from AP Poll released prior to the game; Source:
