= Joe Trivisonno =

American gridiron football player (1933–2017)

No. 98
- Position: Fullback

Personal information
- Born: April 8, 1933; Cleveland, Ohio, U.S.
- Died: December 7, 2017 (aged 84); Mentor, Ohio, U.S.
- Listed height: 5 ft 11 in (1.80 m)
- Listed weight: 214 lb (97 kg)

Career information
- High school: Collinwood (Cleveland)
- College: Ohio State (1953–1957)
- NFL draft: 1958: undrafted

Career history
- Toronto Argonauts (1958); Buffalo Bills (1960)*
- * Offseason or practice squad member only

Awards and highlights
- National champion (1957)

Career CFL statistics
- Rushing yards: 13
- Receptions: 1
- Receiving yards: -2
- Return yards: 2

Joseph John Trivisonno (April 8, 1933 – December 7, 2017) was an American former professional football fullback who played in the Interprovincial Rugby Football Union (IRFU) with the Toronto Argonauts. He played college football for the Ohio State Buckeyes.

== Early life ==
Trivisonno was born on April 8, 1933 in Cleveland, Ohio. He attended Collinwood High School in Cleveland.

== College career ==
Trivisonno played college football for the Ohio State Buckeyes from 1953 to 1957 and was a three-year letterman from 1955 to 1957. In February 1953, he enrolled to the University of Notre Dame but transferred to Ohio State University in the fall. Trivisonno spent the next two seasons on the freshman team due to the Big Ten transfer rules. He rushed 35 times for 275 yards and two touchdowns.

== Professional career ==
=== Toronto Argonauts ===
On April 15, 1958, Trivisonno signed with the Toronto Argonauts of the Interprovincial Rugby Football Union (IRFU). He had 13 yards on three rushes with one catch for -2 yards. On September 15, Trivisonno was released by the team.

=== Buffalo Bills ===
On April 16, 1960, the Buffalo Bills, of the newly-formed American football League (AFL), signed Trivisonno. On July 18, he left training camp after injuring his hamstring.

== Personal life ==
After retiring form professional football, Trivisonno took up a coaching teaching job at his alma mater, Collinwood High School. He also coach football at Charles F. Brush High School in Lyndhurst, Ohio, before retiring in 1987. Trivisonno died on December 7, 2017, in Mentor, Ohio.
