= David Burkholder =

Canadian football player (1936–1999)

Profile
- Position: Halfback

Personal information
- Born: October 21, 1936; Minneapolis, Minnesota, U.S.
- Died: October 12, 1999 (aged 62); Minnetonka, Minnesota, U.S.
- Listed height: 6 ft 1 in (1.85 m)
- Listed weight: 225 lb (102 kg)

Career information
- High school: DeLaSalle (MN)
- College: Minnesota
- NFL draft: 1958: 26th round, 310th overall pick

Career history
- 1958–1964: Winnipeg Blue Bombers

Awards and highlights
- 4× Grey Cup champion (1958, 1959, 1961, 1962); Second-team All-Big Ten (1957); 3× CFL West All-Star (1958, 1960, 1961)

David Alan Burkholder (October 21, 1936 – October 12, 1999) was an American professional football player who played for the Winnipeg Blue Bombers. He won the Grey Cup with them in 1958, 1959, 1961 and 1962. He played college football at the University of Minnesota. In 1999, Burkholder died of cancer, aged 62.
