= Patrick F. Burke =

American entrepreneur (1934–2011)

Pat Burke

No. 71
- Position: Tackle

Personal information
- Born: February 20, 1934; Lawrence, Massachusetts, U.S.
- Died: February 2, 2011 (aged 76); Lawrence, Massachusetts, U.S.

Career information
- High school: Lawrence (MA)
- College: Michigan State University (1955–1957)

Awards and highlights
- First-team All-Big Ten (1957)

Patrick F. Burke (February 20, 1934 – February 2, 2011), sometimes known by the nicknames "Senator" and "One Round" (the latter due to his prowess in scoring first-round knockouts as a boxer), was an American football player, nightclub and restaurant owner, and operator of a betting service called Vegas One News. He played three seasons as a two-way tackle for the Michigan State Spartans football team from 1955 to 1957 and was the captain of the 1957 team. He was selected by both the Associated Press and United Press as a first-team tackle on the 1957 All-Big Ten Conference football team. During Burke's three seasons at Michigan State, the Spartans compiled an overall record of 24–4 and were ranked No. 2, No. 9, and No. 3 in the final AP polls.

== Early life ==
Burke was born in Lawrence, Massachusetts, in 1934. He attended Lawrence High School where he was captain of the football team and received the Edward Gregg medal as the top student-athlete in his class. He thereafter spent a year at Staunton Military Academy in Virginia.

== College football ==
Burke began his collegiate career at Cornell University. He played for the freshman football team at Cornell and won the school's heavyweight boxing championship.

As a sophomore in the fall of 1955, he transferred to Michigan State University. He became a starter at tackle, on both offense and defense, for the 1955 Michigan State Spartans football team that compiled a 9–1 record, defeated UCLA in the 1956 Rose Bowl, and was ranked No. 2 in the final Associated Press (AP) and United Press (UP) polls. At 189 pounds, the Los Angeles Times described him as "probably the lightest starting tackle in big-time college ball." Michigan State coach Duffy Daugherty noted that Burke could stand to gain 20 pounds but touted him as one of the best sophomore players in the country.

As a junior, Burke missed the last five games of the season due to a knee injury suffered against Notre Dame; the injury required him to undergo surgery.

Despite missing part of the 1956 season, he was voted by his teammates as captain of the 1957 Michigan State Spartans football team. At the time, Burke said: "Being elected captain by my teammates is the greatest honor I shall ever receive." He returned to the starting lineup in 1957 and promised that the Spartans would return to the Rose Bowl. Though Ohio State took the Big Ten's Rose Bowl berth, Burke led the 1957 Spartans to an 8–1 record and the No. 3 ranking in the final AP and UP polls.

At the end of his senior season, he was selected by both the AP and UP as a first-team tackle on the 1957 All-Big Ten Conference football team. He was also selected as co-captain of the annual East-West Shrine Game.

During Burke's three seasons at Michigan State, the Spartans compiled an overall record of 24–4 and were ranked No. 2, No. 9, and No. 3 in the final AP polls. Burke was also Michigan State's senior class president and a member of Sigma Alpha Epsilon fraternity.

== Later life ==
In January 1958, Burke signed to play for the New York Giants in the National Football League. Due to a knee injury, he voluntarily left the Giants in August 1958.

Burke subsequently attended Wayne State Law School. He owned the Coral Gables Nightclub in East Lansing, Michigan, Mr. Kelly's on Rush Street in Chicago, Clarke's in Boston and was part owner of a Washington, D.C. restaurant with his former Michigan State teammate and later Washington Redskins player Fran O'Brien.

Burke later moved to Las Vegas where he established a nationally syndicated betting service called Vegas One News.

Burke moved back to Massachusetts in 2000 and resided in his later years in Andover, Massachusetts. He suffered from past football injuries and other health problems and died in 2011 at age 76 at Lawrence General Hospital.
