= 1957 Indiana Hoosiers football team =

American college football season

1957 Indiana Hoosiers football
- Conference: Big Ten Conference
- Record: 1–8 (0–6 Big Ten)
- Head coach: Bob Hicks (1st season)
- MVP: Tony Aloisio
- Captain: Don Howell
- Home stadium: Memorial Stadium

1957 Big Ten Conference football standings
	Conf.					Overall
Team	W		L		T	W		L		T
No. 2 Ohio State $	7	–	0	–	0	9	–	1	–	0
No. 3 Michigan State	5	–	1	–	0	8	–	1	–	0
No. 6 Iowa	4	–	1	–	1	7	–	1	–	1
No. 19 Wisconsin	4	–	3	–	0	6	–	3	–	0
Purdue	4	–	3	–	0	5	–	4	–	0
Michigan	3	–	3	–	1	5	–	3	–	1
Illinois	3	–	4	–	0	4	–	5	–	0
Minnesota	3	–	5	–	0	4	–	5	–	0
Indiana	0	–	6	–	0	1	–	8	–	0
Northwestern	0	–	7	–	0	0	–	9	–	0
$ – Conference champion; Rankings from AP Poll

The 1957 Indiana Hoosiers football team represented the Indiana Hoosiers in the 1957 Big Ten Conference football season. The Hoosiers played their home games at Memorial Stadium in Bloomington, Indiana. The team was led by Bob Hicks, in his only year as head coach of the Hoosiers.

== Schedule ==
Date	Opponent	Site	Result	Attendance	Source
September 28	at No. 4 Michigan State	Spartan Stadium; East Lansing, MI (rivalry)	L 0–54	52,162	
October 5	at No. 16 Notre Dame*	Notre Dame Stadium; Notre Dame, IN	L 0–26	54,026	
October 12	No. 8 Iowa^{†}	Memorial Stadium; Bloomington, IN	L 7–47	23,000	
October 19	at Ohio State	Ohio Stadium; Columbus, OH	L 0–56	78,348	
October 26	Villanova*	Memorial Stadium; Bloomington, IN	W 14–7	20,000	
November 2	at Minnesota	Memorial Stadium; Minneapolis, MN	L 0–34	63,206	
November 9	Cincinnati*	Memorial Stadium; Bloomington, IN	L 0–21	17,000	
November 16	at No. 18 Michigan	Michigan Stadium; Ann Arbor, MI	L 13–27	56,254	
November 23	Purdue	Memorial Stadium; Bloomington, IN (Old Oaken Bucket)	L 13–35	27,000	
*Non-conference game; ^{†}Homecoming; Rankings from AP Poll released prior to the game; Source:

== 1958 NFL draftees ==
Player	Position	Round	Pick	NFL club
Jim Yore	Back	13	151	San Francisco 49ers
Tony Aloisio	End	22	255	Chicago Cardinals
Dave Whitsell	Back	24	289	Detroit Lions
