= 1957 Wisconsin Badgers football team =

American college football season

1957 Wisconsin Badgers football
- Conference: Big Ten Conference

Ranking
- Coaches: No. 15
- AP: No. 19
- Record: 6–3 (4–3 Big Ten)
- Head coach: Milt Bruhn (2nd season)
- MVP: Dan Lewis
- Captain: William Gehler
- Home stadium: Camp Randall Stadium

1957 Big Ten Conference football standings
	Conf.					Overall
Team	W		L		T	W		L		T
No. 2 Ohio State $	7	–	0	–	0	9	–	1	–	0
No. 3 Michigan State	5	–	1	–	0	8	–	1	–	0
No. 6 Iowa	4	–	1	–	1	7	–	1	–	1
No. 19 Wisconsin	4	–	3	–	0	6	–	3	–	0
Purdue	4	–	3	–	0	5	–	4	–	0
Michigan	3	–	3	–	1	5	–	3	–	1
Illinois	3	–	4	–	0	4	–	5	–	0
Minnesota	3	–	5	–	0	4	–	5	–	0
Indiana	0	–	6	–	0	1	–	8	–	0
Northwestern	0	–	7	–	0	0	–	9	–	0
$ – Conference champion; Rankings from AP Poll

The 1957 Wisconsin Badgers football team represented the University of Wisconsin in the 1957 Big Ten Conference football season. Led by second-year head coach Milt Bruhn, the Badgers compiled an overall record of 6–3 with a mark of 4–3 in conference play, tying for fourth place in the Big Ten.

== Schedule ==
Date	Opponent	Rank	Site	Result	Attendance	Source
September 28	Marquette*		Camp Randall Stadium; Madison, WI	W 60–6	47,267	
October 5	West Virginia*		Camp Randall Stadium; Madison, WI	W 45–13	38,889	
October 12	at Purdue	No. 16	Ross–Ade Stadium; West Lafayette, IN	W 23–14	40,507	
October 19	at No. 6 Iowa	No. 13	Iowa Stadium; Iowa City, IA (rivalry)	L 7–21	58,147	
October 26	No. 12 Ohio State		Camp Randall Stadium; Madison, WI	L 13–16	50,051	
November 2	No. 6 Michigan State		Camp Randall Stadium; Madison, WI	L 7–21	49,826	
November 9	at Northwestern		Dyche Stadium; Evanston, IL	W 41–12	32,250	
November 16	No. 15 Illinois^{†}		Camp Randall Stadium; Madison, WI	W 24–13	52,384	
November 23	at Minnesota	No. 18	Memorial Stadium; Minneapolis, MN (rivalry)	W 14–6	62,939	
*Non-conference game; ^{†}Homecoming; Rankings from AP Poll released prior to the game; Source:

== Team players in the 1958 NFL draft ==
Player	Position	Round	Pick	NFL club
Danny Lewis	Back	6	73	Detroit Lions
Rocco Cinelli	Tackle	11	125	Chicago Bears
Sid Williams	Back	11	129	New York Giants
