= Dan Currie =

American football player (1935–2017)

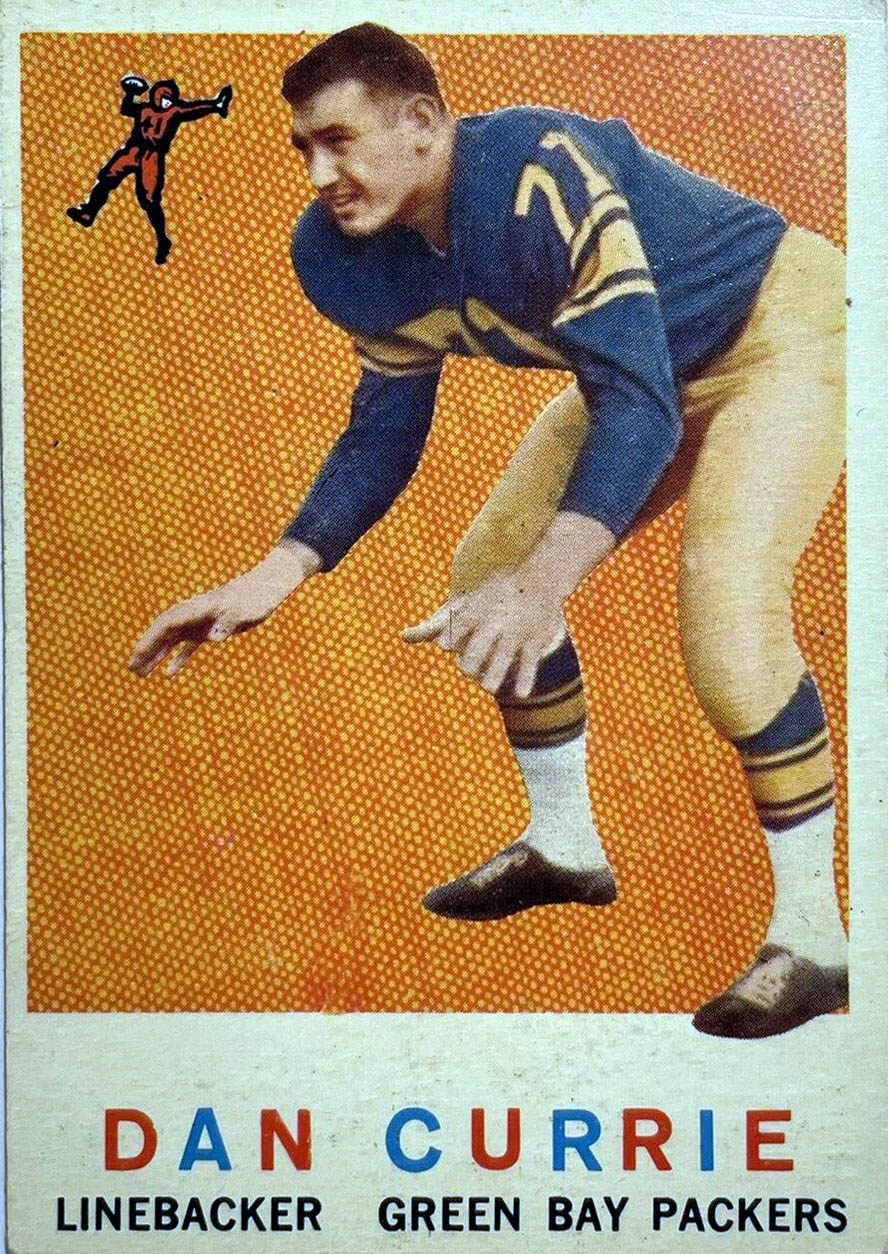
- Currie's 1959 Topps card

No. 58
- Position: Linebacker

Personal information
- Born: June 27, 1935; Detroit, Michigan, U.S.
- Died: September 11, 2017 (aged 82); Las Vegas, Nevada, U.S.
- Listed height: 6 ft 3 in (1.91 m)
- Listed weight: 235 lb (107 kg)

Career information
- High school: St. Anthony (Detroit)
- College: Michigan State
- NFL draft: 1958: 1st round, 3rd overall pick

Career history
- Green Bay Packers (1958–1964); Los Angeles Rams (1965–1966)

Awards and highlights
- 2× NFL champion (1961, 1962); First-team All-Pro (1962); 2× Second-team All-Pro (1961, 1963); Pro Bowl (1960); Green Bay Packers Hall of Fame; Michigan State Athletics Hall of Fame; Consensus All-American (1957); Second-team All-American (1956); First-team All-Big Ten (1957); Second-team All-Big Ten (1956)

Career NFL statistics
- Interceptions: 11
- Fumble recoveries: 7
- Sacks: 4.5
- Stats at Pro Football Reference

Daniel George Currie (June 27, 1935 – September 11, 2017) was an American professional football player in the National Football League (NFL). He played college football for the Michigan State Spartans. He played as a linebacker for nine seasons with the Green Bay Packers and Los Angeles Rams.

== Early life ==
Born and raised in Detroit, Michigan, Currie played college football at Michigan State in East Lansing and was an All-American linebacker and center for the Spartans as a senior in 1957.

== Playing career ==
Currie was the third overall selection of the 1958 NFL draft, the first pick of the Packers. In that draft, the Packers also selected Jim Taylor of LSU (2nd round, 15th overall), Ray Nitschke of Illinois (3rd round, 36th), and Jerry Kramer of Idaho (4th round, 39th). all future members of the Pro Football Hall of Fame.

In his rookie season in 1958 under first-year head coach Ray "Scooter" McLean, the Packers were a league worst 1–10–1; McLean was fired in December and Vince Lombardi was hired as head coach in January 1959. After reviewing film of the Packers' previous season, Lombardi stated that Currie was the only player on the team that he would not trade or release. Green Bay went 7–5 that season and then were in three consecutive NFL title games; they lost to Philadelphia in 1960 and won in 1961 and 1962, both over the New York Giants. Currie was an All-Pro in 1962, one of ten Packers on the 22-man Associated Press team, and was featured on the cover of Sports Illustrated in December 1961.

After seven seasons in Green Bay, Currie was traded to the Rams in April 1965 for receiver Carroll Dale. He played two years for Los Angeles, then missed the final cut in September 1967 season at age 32. In 1984, he was inducted into the Green Bay Packers Hall of Fame. In 2026, he was inducted into the Michigan State Athletics Hall of Fame

== After football ==
Currie was later a defensive coach at Milton College in Wisconsin, which closed in 1982. He moved to Las Vegas in the early 1980s and worked in casino security; he died at age 82 at MountainView Hospital in 2017.
