= Jim Ninowski =

American football player (1936–2024)

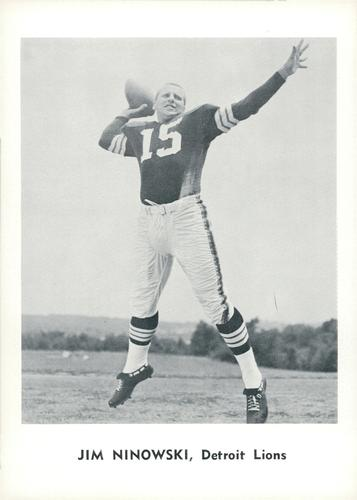

No. 15, 11
- Position: Quarterback

Personal information
- Born: March 26, 1936; Detroit, Michigan, U.S.
- Died: July 23, 2024 (aged 88); Sterling Heights, Michigan, U.S.
- Listed height: 6 ft 1 in (1.85 m)
- Listed weight: 206 lb (93 kg)

Career information
- High school: Pershing (Detroit)
- College: Michigan State
- NFL draft: 1958: 4th round, 49th overall pick

Career history
- Cleveland Browns (1958–1959); Detroit Lions (1960–1961); Cleveland Browns (1962–1966); Washington Redskins (1967–1968); New Orleans Saints (1969)

Awards and highlights
- NFL champion (1964); First-team All-Big Ten (1957)

Career NFL statistics
- Passing attempts: 1,048
- Passing completions: 513
- Completion percentage: 49.0%
- TD–INT: 34–67
- Passing yards: 7,133
- Passer rating: 55.4
- Stats at Pro Football Reference

James Ninowski Jr. (March 26, 1936 – July 23, 2024), also known as Nino, was an American professional football player who was a quarterback in the National Football League (NFL) for the Cleveland Browns, Detroit Lions, Washington Redskins and New Orleans Saints. He played college football for the Michigan State Spartans and was selected in the fourth round of the 1958 NFL draft.

== Early life ==
Ninowski split duties at quarterback at Michigan State University in 1956 and was the starting quarterback in 1957 on squads that relied more on a running game than a passing attack. The 1957 Spartans finished #3 in the Associated Press poll behind #1 Auburn and rival Big Ten Conference champion Ohio State.

Ninowski was selected as offensive captain of the North team for the Christmas Day North-South Shrine Game played in Miami's Orange Bowl. He was selected the North team's Most Valuable Player in the game, won by the North 23–20, as he passed for 295 yards and one touchdown.

== Professional career ==
=== Cleveland Browns ===
Ninowski was drafted by the Cleveland Browns in the fourth round of the 1958 NFL draft. Playing in the 1958 Senior Bowl for the North squad, he squared off against his future head coach Paul Brown who served as coach for the South team. Ninowski passed for a fourth quarter touchdown to fellow Browns' draftee Jim Gibbons (fifth round) for the game's winning touchdown as the North won, 15–13.

Prior to joining the Browns for their 1958 exhibition season, Ninowski quarterbacked the College All-Stars to a 35–19 victory over the NFL champion Detroit Lions in the College All-Star Game on August 15. He teamed with fellow Browns' draftee and future Hall-of-Famer Bobby Mitchell for touchdown passes of 84 and 18 yards. The teammates were named co-Most Valuable Players for the game, with Ninowski setting All-Star game passing records with 14 completions in 20 attempts and 244 total passing yards.

Ninowski was among a group of Browns' quarterbacks that included Milt Plum, John Borton and Bobby Freeman competing for the starting job left open after the 1957 starter, Tommy O'Connell, had been cut prior to the opening of training camp. Paul Brown chose Plum as the starter and Ninowski saw spot duty as the backup in the 1958 and 1959 seasons, starting just one game, a 1958 midseason loss to the Lions.

=== Detroit Lions ===
On July 10, 1960, Ninowski was traded to the Detroit Lions for linebacker Bob Long and the Lions' 1961 first round draft choice, with which the Browns selected Bobby Crespino. Long chose not to report to Cleveland and was subsequently sent to the Los Angeles Rams in exchange for offensive end Leon Clarke.

Finally getting a chance to start, Ninowski started 10 of 12 regular season games for Detroit in 1960, posting a record of five wins and five losses as the Lions tied with the San Francisco 49ers for second place, one game behind the Green Bay Packers. Ninowski threw for 1,599 yards and two touchdowns. .

He started eight of the Lions 14 1961 regular season games with a record of 4–3–1 with the Lions going 8–5–1, good for second again behind the eventual NFL champion Packers (11–3 regular season record). Ninowski threw for 1,921 yards and seven touchdowns, sharing quarterbacking duties with Earl Morrall. .

In his final game for Detroit, Ninowski passed for two touchdowns to Terry Barr as the Lions defeated the Philadelphia Eagles 38–10 in the NFL's second annual Playoff Bowl, a post-season game played at the Orange Bowl in Miami. Florida. The game, played for 10 seasons, pitted the second-place teams from the League's Eastern and Western Divisions for third place in the NFL.

=== Cleveland Browns ===
The Browns re-acquired Ninowski in a March 29, 1962, blockbuster six-player trade that sent Cleveland starting quarterback Milt Plum, offensive halfback Tom Watkins and linebacker/center Dave Lloyd to Detroit. In addition to Ninowski, Cleveland received defensive end Bill Glass and former Ohio State star and 1955 Heisman Trophy winner Howard "Hopalong" Cassady. While the two quarterbacks were the keys to the deal, Glass started at defensive end for Cleveland for the next seven seasons and Watkins saw regular duty as a running back and kick returner for the Lions through the 1967 season.

The trade was controversial in that Plum, a two-time Pro Bowler while leading the NFL in pass completion percentage in from 1959 through 1961, was publicly critical of Paul Brown's coaching style that was based upon calling offensive plays from the sidelines, then a relatively unusual procedure. Plum desired more authority to call plays.

Brown cited the fact that Cleveland had finished second twice and third in 1961 under Plum's quarterbacking and that the team's play calling was patterned to Plum's abilities.

Ninowski was quoted as saying he did not wish to return to the Browns, publicly citing business interests he had developed in Detroit and indicated that he was considering retirement from football and/or not reporting to Cleveland. Cleveland coach Paul Brown was quoted as saying that he had been impressed by Ninowski's progress in Detroit and that Ninowski would start in Cleveland. Brown flew to Detroit on the day after the trade was announced to meet with Ninowski, convincing him to return to Cleveland.

But three months after the trade, Ninowski, citing the fact that he hadn't heard from Paul Brown since their meeting, said he was still undecided about playing in Cleveland. After a May 1 meeting with Browns' owner Art Modell, Ninowski signed a one-year contract with the Browns two weeks later. Paul Brown envisioned an offensive backfield with running backs Jim Brown, newly acquired rookie Ernie Davis and Ninowski. Brown expected that Ninowski's running skills would allow the team to run an option-based offense that put more of an emphasis on rollout passes. Brown also claimed that Ninowski had that patience and peripheral vision to maximize the team's passing patterns. .

Those plans never came to fruition. Davis was diagnosed with leukemia prior to the 1962 College All-Star Game. He never played for the Browns and died within a year of his diagnosis. Ninowski led the Browns to a 4–3 record in 1962 before his season ended when he suffered a dislocated shoulder and fractured clavicle while attempting to pass in an October 28 game against the Pittsburgh Steelers. He was gang tackled by a pass rush led by defensive tackle Big Daddy Lipscomb. He was replaced by Frank Ryan, who had been obtained from the Rams to back up Ninowski prior to the start of training camp.

Ryan started the remaining seven games and the Browns finished third in the NFL's Eastern Division with a record of 7–6–1. Paul Brown, who had coached the Browns since the team's inception in 1946, was fired by Modell on January 7, 1963, during a Cleveland newspaper strike.

The Browns' new head coach, former assistant Blanton Collier, elected to stick with Ryan as the team's starter in 1963. Ninowski served as the backup quarterback for the Browns over the next four seasons, starting three games. He was a member of the last Cleveland Browns championship team in 1964.

=== Washington Redskins ===
Ninowski was a holdout prior to training camp in 1967 and was placed on waivers on July 28 by the Browns, but the waivers were recalled the same day as the team sought to place the quarterback with another NFL team. On August 8, 1967, Ninowski was traded to the Washington Redskins in exchange for quarterback Dick Shiner. With Washington for two seasons, he backed up Sonny Jurgensen, starting two games in 1968. His final NFL start was in Washington's final game of that season against Ninowski's former team, the Lions. He led Washington to a 14–3 victory.

=== New Orleans Saints ===
On June 20, 1969, Ninowski was traded to the New Orleans Saints in exchange for defensive end Dave Long and a fifth round 1970 draft choice. The Redskins used that pick to draft defensive tackle Manny Sistrunk. Ninowski appeared in four games for the Saints, backing up Billy Kilmer and completing 17 of 34 passes, including one touchdown.

== Post-football career NFL antitrust testimony ==
On December 19, 1970, The New York Times reported that Ninowski told reporters, after appearing before a special Federal Grand jury investigating potential antitrust violations regarding NFL operations, that his pay was increased to $100,000 per year for four years (two years retroactively, the final two years at a $100,000 per year salary). He claimed that this was the result of a secret settlement after Ninowski threatened an antitrust suit in 1967 against the NFL and former American Football League (AFL). The article reported that his attorney, Jerry E. Dempsey, claimed Ninowski had negotiated with the AFL's Oakland Raiders while still a member of the Cleveland Browns. The leagues had been in a bidding war for players but a "truce" had been called between the leagues, which later merged, thus ending the contract negotiations and leading to the threatened lawsuit.

== Personal life and death ==
After retiring from professional football, Ninowski worked in several businesses in and around Detroit. He was married to Judith Ann Ohm. They had two children; son Jeffery Scott (born 1959), and daughter Julie Anne (born 1965). He and his wife resided in Troy, Michigan.

Jim Ninowski died on July 23, 2024, at the age of 88.
