= Aurealius Thomas =

American football player (1934–2021)

Profile
- Position: Guard

Personal information
- Born: April 6, 1934; Muskogee, Oklahoma, U.S.
- Died: February 5, 2021 (aged 86)

Career information
- College: Ohio State University
- NFL draft: 1957: 22nd round, 257th overall pick

Awards and highlights
- National champion (1957); First-team All-American (1957); First-team All-Big Ten (1957)
- College Football Hall of Fame

Aurealius Thomas (April 6, 1934 – February 5, 2021), sometimes spelled Aurelius Thomas, was an American football player. A native of Columbus, Ohio, Thomas was six feet, one inch tall and weighed 204 pounds. He attended the Ohio State University where he played college football at the guard position for the Ohio State Buckeyes football team from 1956 to 1957. He was selected by the All-America Board, the American Football Coaches Association, the Associated Press, and the Football Writers Association of America as a first-team guard on their respective 1957 College Football All-America Teams. He averaged 57 minutes a game during the 1957 season, and Ohio State coach Woody Hayes said, "For consistent play on both offense and defense, there is no better guard in college football today." Thomas was drafted in the 22nd round in the 1958 NFL draft by the Pittsburgh Steelers. He was released by the Steelers in late August 1958 before the start of the regular season. After graduating from Ohio State, Thomas worked as a teacher for several years, worked for New York Life Insurance Company and later started his own insurance brokerage business in Columbus, Ohio. He was elected to the College Football Hall of Fame in 1989.

He died on February 5, 2021.
