= 1957 Notre Dame Fighting Irish football team =

American college football season

1957 Notre Dame Fighting Irish football
- Conference: Independent

Ranking
- Coaches: No. 9
- AP: No. 10
- Record: 7–3
- Head coach: Terry Brennan (4th season)
- Captains: Dick Prendergast; Ed Sullivan
- Home stadium: Notre Dame Stadium

1957 Midwestern major college football independents records
	Conf.			Overall
Team	W	L	T	W		L		T
No. 10 Notre Dame		–		7	–	3	–	0
Drake		–		7	–	2	–	0
Detroit		–		6	–	3	–	0
Dayton		–		6	–	3	–	1
Xavier		–		5	–	5	–	0
Marquette		–		0	–	10	–	0
Rankings from AP poll

The 1957 Notre Dame Fighting Irish football team was an American football team that represented the University of Notre Dame as an independent during the 1957 college football season. In their fourth year under head coach Terry Brennan, the Irish compiled a 7–3 record, outscored opponents by a total of 200 to 136, and were ranked No. 10 in the final AP poll. Against ranked opponents, they defeated No. 10 Army and No. 2 Oklahoma, and lost to No. 16 Navy, No. 4 Michigan State, and No. 8 Iowa. Notre Dame's 7–0 victory over Oklahoma snapped the Sooners' NCAA record 47-game winning streak.

Guard Al Ecuyer was a consensus first-team pick on the 1957 All-America college football team. The team's statistical leaders included Nick Pietrosante (449 rushing yards), Bob Williams (565 passing yards), and Monty Stickles (183 receiving yards).

The team played its home games at Notre Dame Stadium in Notre Dame, Indiana.

== Schedule ==
Date	Opponent	Rank	Site	Result	Attendance	Source
September 28	at Purdue		Ross–Ade Stadium; West Lafayette, IN (rivalry)	W 12–0	52,108	
October 5	Indiana	No. 16	Notre Dame Stadium; Notre Dame, IN	W 26–0	54,026	
October 12	vs. No. 10 Army	No. 12	Philadelphia Municipal Stadium; Philadelphia, PA (rivalry)	W 23–21	95,000	
October 26	Pittsburgh	No. 7	Notre Dame Stadium; Notre Dame, IN (rivalry)	W 13–7	58,775	
November 2	No. 16 Navy	No. 5	Notre Dame Stadium; Notre Dame, IN (rivalry)	L 6–20	58,922	
November 9	at No. 4 Michigan State	No. 15	Spartan Stadium; East Lansing, MI (rivalry)	L 6–34	75,391	
November 16	at No. 2 Oklahoma		Oklahoma Memorial Stadium; Norman, OK	W 7–0	62,000	
November 23	No. 8 Iowa	No. 9	Notre Dame Stadium; Notre Dame, IN	L 13–21	58,734	
November 30	USC	No. 12	Notre Dame Stadium; Notre Dame, IN (rivalry)	W 40–12	54,793	
December 7	at SMU	No. 12	Cotton Bowl; Dallas, TX	W 54–21	51,000	
Rankings from AP Poll released prior to the game; Source:

== Team players drafted into the NFL ==
The following players were drafted into professional football following the season.

Player	Position	Round	Pick	Franchise
