= 1957 Illinois Fighting Illini football team =

American college football season

1957 Illinois Fighting Illini football
- Conference: Big Ten Conference
- Record: 4–5 (3–4 Big Ten)
- Head coach: Ray Eliot (16th season)
- MVP: Ron Hanson
- Captain: Dale Smith
- Home stadium: Memorial Stadium

1957 Big Ten Conference football standings
	Conf.					Overall
Team	W		L		T	W		L		T
No. 2 Ohio State $	7	–	0	–	0	9	–	1	–	0
No. 3 Michigan State	5	–	1	–	0	8	–	1	–	0
No. 6 Iowa	4	–	1	–	1	7	–	1	–	1
No. 19 Wisconsin	4	–	3	–	0	6	–	3	–	0
Purdue	4	–	3	–	0	5	–	4	–	0
Michigan	3	–	3	–	1	5	–	3	–	1
Illinois	3	–	4	–	0	4	–	5	–	0
Minnesota	3	–	5	–	0	4	–	5	–	0
Indiana	0	–	6	–	0	1	–	8	–	0
Northwestern	0	–	7	–	0	0	–	9	–	0
$ – Conference champion; Rankings from AP Poll

The 1957 Illinois Fighting Illini football team was an American football team that represented the University of Illinois as a member of the Big Ten Conference during the 1957 Big Ten season. In their 16th year under head coach Ray Eliot, the Illini compiled a 4–5 record (3–4 in conference games), finished in seventh place in the Big Ten, and outscored opponents by a total of 167 to 133.

The team's statistical leaders included quarterback Tom Haller (675 passing yards, 51.0% completion percentage), fullback Ray Nitschke (514 rushing yards, 6.5 yards per carry), and end Rich Kreitling (12 receptions for 203 yards). End Ron Hanson was selected as the team's most valuable player.

The team played its home games at Memorial Stadium in Champaign, Illinois.

== Schedule ==
Date	Opponent	Rank	Site	Result	Attendance	Source
September 27	at UCLA*		Los Angeles Memorial Coliseum; Los Angeles, CA	L 6–16	48,714	
October 5	Colgate*		Memorial Stadium; Champaign, IL	W 40–0	41,594	
October 12	at Ohio State		Ohio Stadium; Columbus, OH (Illibuck)	L 7–21	82,239	
October 19	No. 4 Minnesota		Memorial Stadium; Champaign, IL	W 34–13	69,619	
October 26	at No. 8 Michigan State	No. 16	Spartan Stadium; East Lansing, MI	L 14–19	64,353	
November 2	Purdue		Memorial Stadium; Champaign, IL (rivalry)	L 6–21	47,690	
November 9	No. 11 Michigan		Memorial Stadium; Champaign, IL (rivalry)	W 20–19	46,007	
November 16	at Wisconsin	No. 15	Camp Randall Stadium; Madison, WI	L 13–24	52,384	
November 23	Northwestern		Memorial Stadium; Champaign, IL (rivalry)	W 27–0	27,017	
*Non-conference game; Rankings from AP Poll released prior to the game; Source:
