= Jon Jelacic =

American gridiron football player (1936–1993)

No. 83, 69, 66, 88
- Position: Defensive end

Personal information
- Born: December 19, 1936; Brainerd, Minnesota, U.S.
- Died: September 17, 1993 (aged 56); Beltrami County, Minnesota, U.S.
- Listed height: 6 ft 3 in (1.91 m)
- Listed weight: 250 lb (113 kg)

Career information
- High school: Brainerd
- College: Minnesota (1954–1957)
- NFL draft: 1958: 7th round, 74th overall pick

Career history
- New York Giants (1958); Ottawa Rough Riders (1959–1960); Montreal Alouettes (1961)*; Oakland Raiders (1961–1964)
- * Offseason or practice squad member only

Awards and highlights
- Grey Cup champion (1960)

Career NFL/AFL statistics
- Fumble recoveries: 3
- Interceptions: 2
- Touchdowns: 2
- Sacks: 3
- Stats at Pro Football Reference

Jon Jelacic (Pronounced: Jeh-LAH-sik) (December 19, 1936 – September 17, 1993) was an American gridiron football player who played defensive lineman for five seasons for the New York Giants of the National Football League (NFL) and the Oakland Raiders of the American Football League (AFL). Jelacic also played two seasons with the Ottawa Rough Riders of the Canadian Football League (CFL), including their 1960 Grey Cup championship season.

Jelacic was born in Brainerd, Minnesota and played high school football, basketball and ran track. He played college football as an end at the University of Minnesota and was captain of the 1957 Minnesota Golden Gophers football team. Following his professional playing career in three leagues, Jelacic worked as a scout for the Atlanta Falcons and Green Bay Packers. He died in his sleep in his lake cabin northeast of Bemidji, Minnesota, on September 17, 1993.
