= 1957 Michigan Wolverines football team =

American college football season

1957 Michigan Wolverines football
- Conference: Big Ten Conference
- Record: 5–3–1 (3–3–1 Big Ten)
- Head coach: Bennie Oosterbaan (10th season)
- MVP: Jim Pace
- Captain: Jim Orwig
- Home stadium: Michigan Stadium

1957 Big Ten Conference football standings
	Conf.					Overall
Team	W		L		T	W		L		T
No. 2 Ohio State $	7	–	0	–	0	9	–	1	–	0
No. 3 Michigan State	5	–	1	–	0	8	–	1	–	0
No. 6 Iowa	4	–	1	–	1	7	–	1	–	1
No. 19 Wisconsin	4	–	3	–	0	6	–	3	–	0
Purdue	4	–	3	–	0	5	–	4	–	0
Michigan	3	–	3	–	1	5	–	3	–	1
Illinois	3	–	4	–	0	4	–	5	–	0
Minnesota	3	–	5	–	0	4	–	5	–	0
Indiana	0	–	6	–	0	1	–	8	–	0
Northwestern	0	–	7	–	0	0	–	9	–	0
$ – Conference champion; Rankings from AP Poll

The 1957 Michigan Wolverines football team represented the University of Michigan in the 1957 Big Ten Conference football season. In its 10th year under head coach Bennie Oosterbaan, Michigan compiled a 5–3–1 record (3–3–1 against conference opponents), finished in sixth place in the Big Ten, and outscored opponents by a combined total of 187 to 147. Michigan was unranked in the final AP and UPI polls; it was ranked at No. 19 in the final Litkenhous Ratings.

Left tackle Jim Orwig was the team captain. Left halfback Jim Pace received the team's most valuable player award, won the Chicago Tribune Silver Football as the most valuable player in the Big Ten, and was selected as a first-team All-American and All-Big Ten player.

The team's statistical leaders included quarterback Jim Van Pelt with 629 passing yards, Jim Pace with 664 rushing yards, and left end Gary Prahst with 233 receiving yards.

== Schedule ==
Date	Opponent	Rank	Site	Result	Attendance	Source
September 28	at USC*	No. 10	Los Angeles Memorial Coliseum; Los Angeles, CA	W 16–6	44,739	
October 5	Georgia*	No. 10	Michigan Stadium; Ann Arbor, MI	W 26–0	85,002	
October 12	No. 2 Michigan State	No. 6	Michigan Stadium; Ann Arbor, MI (rivalry)	L 6–35	101,001	
October 19	Northwestern^{†}	No. 18	Michigan Stadium; Ann Arbor, MI (rivalry)	W 34–14	70,884	
October 26	at No. 14 Minnesota	No. 20	Memorial Stadium; Minneapolis, MN (Little Brown Jug)	W 24–7	64,680	
November 2	No. 3 Iowa	No. 12	Michigan Stadium; Ann Arbor, MI	T 21–21	90,478	
November 9	at Illinois	No. 11	Memorial Stadium; Champaign, IL (rivalry)	L 19–20	46,007	
November 16	Indiana	No. 18	Michigan Stadium; Ann Arbor, MI	W 27–13	56,254	
November 23	No. 3 Ohio State	No. 19	Michigan Stadium; Ann Arbor, MI (rivalry)	L 14–31	101,001	
*Non-conference game; ^{†}Homecoming; Rankings from AP Poll released prior to the game

== Statistical leaders ==
Michigan's individual statistical leaders for the 1957 season include those listed below.

=== Rushing ===
Player	Attempts	Net yards	Yards per attempt	Touchdowns
Jim Pace	123	664	5.4	7
Brad Myers	69	252	3.6	2
Jim Byers	31	161	5.2	0
Bob Ptacek	60	161	2.7	0

=== Passing ===
Player	Attempts	Completions	Interceptions	Comp %	Yards	Yds/Comp	TD	Long
Jim Van Pelt	80	42	3	52.5	629	15.0	7	45
Stan Noskin	52	24	5	46.1	344	14.3	1	37

=== Receiving ===
Player	Receptions	Yards	Yds/Recp	TD	Long
Gary Prahst	15	233	15.5	2	45
Brad Myers	9	159	17.7	2	33
Walt Johnson	9	122	13.6	0	22
Jim Pace	11	122	11.1	2	14

=== Kickoff returns ===
Player	Returns	Yards	Yds/Return	TD	Long
Jim Pace	5	114	22.8	0	35
Mike Shatusky	6	110	18.3	0	24
Stan Noskin	3	68	22.7	0	25

=== Punt returns ===
Player	Returns	Yards	Yds/Return	TD	Long
Jim Pace	8	98	12.3	1	65
Bob Ptacek	8	82	10.3	0	25
Brad Myers	5	40	8.0	0	

== Players ==
The starting lineup of the 1957 football team was made up of the following players. Players who started at least four games are shown with their names in bold.

- Robert Boshoven - started 1 game at right end
- Dave Bowers - started 1 game at left end
- **James Byers**- started 4 games at fullback
- Alex Callahan - started 1 game at left guard
- **James Davies** - started 9 games at right tackle
- **Larry Faul** - started 8 games at left guard
- **Jerry Goebel** - started 5 games at center
- **John Herrnstein** - started 4 games at fullback
- Dick Heynen - started 1 game at left tackle
- **Walter Johnson** - started 8 games at right end
- Jerry Marciniak - started 1 game at right guard
- Brad Myers - started 3 games at right halfback
- Stan Noskin - started 2 games at quarterback
- **Marv Nyren** - started 8 games at right guard
- **Jim Orwig** - started 8 games at left tackle
- **Jim Pace** - started 9 games at left halfback
- **Gary Prahst** - started 8 games at left end
- **Mike Shatusky** - started 6 games at right halfback
- **Gene Snider** - started 4 games at center
- **Jim Van Pelt** - started 7 games at quarterback (7)

Other players on the team included the following:

- Willie Smith - tackle

== Awards and honors ==
Honors and awards for the 1957 season went to the following individuals.

- Captain: Jim Orwig
- All-Americans: Jim Pace
- All-Big Ten: Jim Pace
- Most Valuable Player: Jim Pace
- Meyer Morton Award: Charles Teusher
- John Maulbetsch Award: George Genyk

== Coaching staff ==
Michigan's 1957 coaching, training, and support staff included the following persons.

- Head coach: Bennie Oosterbaan
- Assistant coaches: Jack Blott, Don Dufek, Bump Elliott, Robert Hollway, Cliff Keen, Matt Patanelli, Walter Weber
- Trainer: Jim Hunt
- Manager: Lynn Evans
