= Don Clark (Canadian football) =

American gridiron football player (born 1936)

Profile
- Position: Running back

Personal information
- Born: December 27, 1936 (age 89); Akron, Ohio, U.S.
- Listed height: 5 ft 11 in (1.80 m)
- Listed weight: 190 lb (86 kg)

Career information
- College: Ohio State
- NFL draft: 1959: 1st round, 7th overall pick

Career history
- 1959: Ottawa Rough Riders
- 1960–1963: Montreal Alouettes

Awards and highlights
- CFL East All-Star (1961); National champion (1957); Second-team All-American (1957); 2× First-team All-Big Ten (1957, 1958); Second-team All-Big Ten (1956)

Don Clark (born December 27, 1936) is a former all-star running back in the Canadian Football League (CFL).

Clark played his college football for the Ohio State Buckeyes. Playing from 1956 to 1958, he was a member of their 1957 Rose Bowl victory and national championship. An All-American, he was drafted in the first round of the 1959 NFL draft by the Chicago Bears, even though he was injured.

Clark eventually signed with the Ottawa Rough Riders in 1959. After rushing for 343 yards, he couldn't agree on contract terms with Ottawa, and was traded to the Winnipeg Blue Bombers, who promptly dealt him to the Montreal Alouettes.

Clark was part of a Lark's backfield which also included George Dixon. He rushed for 902 yards in 1960 (Dixon had 976) and 1143 yards in 1961, when he was selected as an Eastern All Star. Injuries took their toll during his last two years, as he played only 12 games and rushed for 435 and 447 yards (while Dixon won the MVP award rushing for 1520 yards.) Clark retired in 1964, only 27 years old, due to knee, rib and kidney injuries.
