= Bill Jobko =

American football player (1935–2004)

No. 57
- Position: Linebacker

Personal information
- Born: October 7, 1935; Bridgeport, Ohio, U.S.
- Died: December 18, 2004 (aged 69); Snellville, Georgia, U.S.
- Listed height: 6 ft 2 in (1.88 m)
- Listed weight: 224 lb (102 kg)

Career information
- High school: Bridgeport
- College: Ohio State
- NFL draft: 1958: 7th round, 80th overall pick

Career history

Playing
- Los Angeles Rams (1958–1962); Minnesota Vikings (1963–1965); Atlanta Falcons (1966)

Coaching
- Atlanta Falcons (1968) Linebackers

Awards and highlights
- National champion (1957)

Career NFL statistics
- Interceptions: 5
- Fumble recoveries: 11
- Sacks: 6
- Stats at Pro Football Reference

William Kermit Jobko (October 7, 1935 – December 18, 2004) was an American professional football linebacker who played nine seasons in the National Football League (NFL) for the Rams (1958–1962), the Minnesota Vikings (1963–1965) and the Atlanta Falcons (1966). He played college football at Ohio State.

== Early life ==
He attended Bridgeport High School (OH). He accepted a football scholarship from Ohio State University, where he became a starter on the offensive line for the 1954 and 1957 national championship teams. In 1957, he received All-American and the team's most valuable player honors.

== Professional career ==
Jobko was selected by the Los Angeles Rams in the seventh round (80th overall) of the 1958 NFL draft.

1966 was his last year as a linebacker because he developed high blood pressure and was forced to retire for health reasons.

== Personal life ==
In 1968, he served as the Falcons' assistant linebackers coach under head coach Norb Heckerin. In 1969, he was hired as a Falcons college scout. From 1978 to 1989, he was the Falcons director of pro personnel.

Jobko died of an abdominal aortic aneurysm on December 18, 2004.
