= Jim Van Pelt =

American gridiron football player (1935–2022)

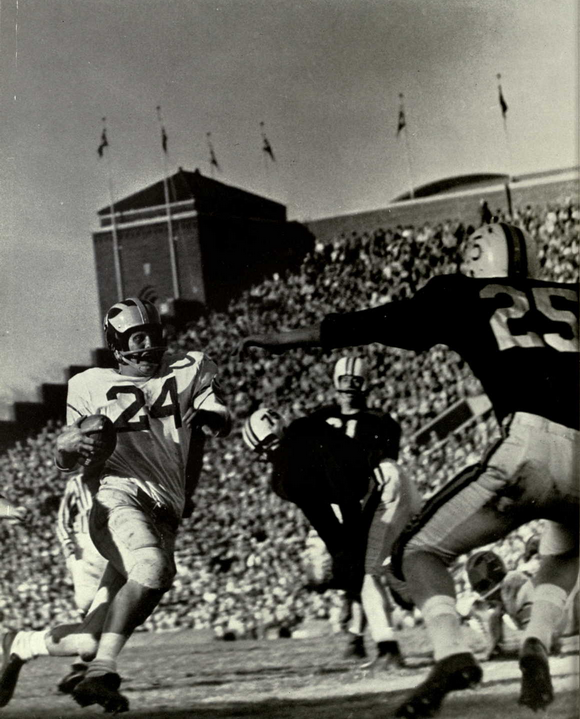
- Van Pelt in 1957 against Minnesota at Old Memorial Stadium

No. 24
- Position: Quarterback

Personal information
- Born: November 11, 1935; Chicago, Illinois, U.S.
- Died: July 2, 2022 (aged 86); Winnetka, Illinois, U.S.
- Listed height: 5 ft 11 in (1.80 m)
- Listed weight: 187 lb (85 kg)

Career information
- High school: Evanston Township
- College: Michigan
- NFL draft: 1958: 5th round, 55th overall pick

Career history
- 1958–1959: Winnipeg Blue Bombers

Awards and highlights
- 2× Grey Cup champion (1958, 1959); CFL West All-Star (1959); Second-team All-American (1957)

James Sutton Van Pelt (November 11, 1935 – July 2, 2022) was an American professional football player who was a quarterback for the Winnipeg Blue Bombers in the Canadian Football League (CFL). He played college football for the Michigan Wolverines from 1955 to 1957. Playing in the CFL in 1958 and 1959, he led the Blue Bombers to consecutive Grey Cup championships and set league records with seven touchdown passes in a game, a 107-yard touchdown pass, and 22 points scored in the 1958 Grey Cup championship game.

His professional football career ended in 1960 when he was drafted into the United States Air Force for a three-year term of service. He died on July 2, 2022, at the age of 86.

== Early life ==
Van Pelt was born on November 11, 1935, in Chicago, the son of Jean (Barkdull) and James Sutton Van Pelt. He attended Evanston Township High School. He was Evanston's starting quarterback in his junior and senior years (1952 and 1953), and was inducted into the Evanston Township High School Athletic Hall of Fame.

== University of Michigan ==
After graduating from high school, Van Pelt enrolled at the University of Michigan in 1954. He played in the quarterback position in 22 games for Michigan during the 1955, 1956 and 1957 football seasons. He was the starting quarterback for the 1957 Michigan Wolverines football team that opened the season 4–1, including a victory over USC, but finished with a 5–3–1 record. In Michigan's four wins in the first half of the 1957 season, Van Pelt completed 21 of 31 passes for 315 yards and three touchdowns. Prior to the 1957 Northwestern game, Van Pelt was bed-ridden with the flu, but despite the illness, he led the Wolverines to a 34–14 win. Van Pelt completed three of four passes in the game for 66 yards and two touchdowns, including a 45-yard touchdown pass to Gary Prahst. He also ran for a touchdown and successfully kicked three extra points. In a 24–7 win over Minnesota, Van Pelt was responsible for 18 of Michigan's points as he threw two touchdown passes (including a 37-yard completion to Dave Bowers), kicked a field goal and added three extra points.

In his final game for Michigan, Van Pelt passed for 106 yards (including a 33-yard touchdown pass to Brad Myers), the highest single-game total during his three years Michigan career. However, it was not enough as Ohio State beat Michigan, 31–14.

After the 1957 season, Van Pelt played in two post-season all-star games. He played in the North–South Shrine Game at the Orange Bowl in Miami, Florida, throwing a touchdown pass for the winning North team. In January 1958, he also played in the Senior Bowl in Mobile, Alabama.

In three years at Michigan, Van Pelt completed 66 of 134 passes for 989 yards, ten touchdowns and five interceptions. He also had two rushing touchdowns and one receiving touchdown.

== Professional football ==
Van Pelt was selected by the Washington Redskins in the fifth round (55th overall pick) of the 1958 NFL draft. Instead of playing in the NFL, Van Pelt signed a contract in February 1958 to play for the Winnipeg Blue Bombers. In his rookie season, Van Pelt began the season playing principally as a defensive halfback, but he got the chance to start at quarterback when Kenny Ploen was injured. He played so well in place of Ploen that he won the job as Winnipeg's starting quarterback. Van Pelt also handled placekicking for the Bombers. He set a Canadian Football League record with a 107-yard touchdown pass to Ernie Pitts during a 1958 game against Calgary.

Van Pelt led the Blue Bombers to the Grey Cup championship. He scored a record 22 points (two touchdowns, two field goals and four extra points) in the 1958 Grey Cup championship game, as the Blue Bombers defeated the Hamilton Tiger-Cats 35–28. Van Pelt's first touchdown came on a trick play when he pitched the ball to halfback Leo Lewis and then took a pass from Lewis to run untouched 29 yards into the end zone. His second touchdown was a game-winning touchdown in the fourth quarter—a one-yard run that gave the Bombers a 35–28 lead. In its game coverage, The Montreal Gazette reported:

Jimmy Van Pelt, a freshman import quarterback from the University of Michigan was the producer, director and principal actor in Winnipeg's unexpected decision over the defending champions. He scored 22 points for a new Grey Cup record. ... Van Pelt took over as the stream-lined Grey Cup hero ... the country's national football pin-up boy. The Flying Dutchman grabbed a surprise pass from Leo Lewis for one touchdown, plunged over center from one yard out for another.

During the 1958 season, Van Pelt completed 90 of 160 passes for 1,445 yards, nine touchdowns and ten interceptions.

In August 1959, Van Pelt dislocated a bone in his left hand during an exhibition game featuring a rematch of the Grey Cup championship game between Winnipeg and Hamilton. Despite the injury, Van Pelt was the starting quarterback in Winnipeg's season opener against the British Columbia Lions. Wearing a cast on his left wrist, Van Pelt scored 27 points as he threw three touchdown passes with his right hand, rushed for a fourth touchdown and kicked a field goal. Van Pelt led the Winnipeg team to another western division championship in 1959, but he suffered a shoulder separation late in the season. Before suffering the injury, Van Pelt was having the best year of his career. During the 1959 season, he completed 160 of 300 passes for 2,706 yards, 31 touchdowns and 15 interceptions. He also set a Western Conference record by throwing seven touchdown passes in a single game against the Saskatchewan Roughriders.

Winnipeg coach Bud Grant noted, "Until Van Pelt was injured, I was pretty sure we had a better team than the 1958 champions. ... For 32 games Van Pelt played 99 percent of the time at quarterback. ... Before he was injured Jim had the team moving real well." Winnipeg went on to win its second consecutive Grey Cup championship with Kenny Ploen playing quarterback in the championship game.

== Later life ==
Van Pelt's football career was cut short when he was drafted into the United States Air Force in the summer of 1960 for a three-year period of service.

In November 1962, Van Pelt, then a lieutenant in the U.S. Air Force, watched the Blue Bombers defend their Grey Cup championship as the guest of the club. Winnipeg general manager Jim Ausley would have Van Pelt back "if he wants to play football again."

In June 1963, Van Pelt announced that he would not resume his football career after his discharge from the Air Force. Van Pelt said he planned to take an accounting job in Chicago. In an interview with the Winnipeg Tribune, he explained, "My wife and I talked it over for a long time and decided the job in Chicago was the best move."

After his retirement from football, he worked with the Quaker Oats Company and Grundy Industries.

Van Pelt died on July 2, 2022, at his home in Winnetka, Illinois, at the age of 86. He was married to Catherine Carrero from 1963 until her death in 2020. They had two children.
