= 1957 Minnesota Golden Gophers football team =

American college football season

1957 Minnesota Golden Gophers football
- Conference: Big Ten Conference
- Record: 4–5 (3–5 Big Ten)
- Head coach: Murray Warmath (4th season)
- MVP: Dick Larson
- Captain: Jon Jelacic
- Home stadium: Memorial Stadium

1957 Big Ten Conference football standings
	Conf.					Overall
Team	W		L		T	W		L		T
No. 2 Ohio State $	7	–	0	–	0	9	–	1	–	0
No. 3 Michigan State	5	–	1	–	0	8	–	1	–	0
No. 6 Iowa	4	–	1	–	1	7	–	1	–	1
No. 19 Wisconsin	4	–	3	–	0	6	–	3	–	0
Purdue	4	–	3	–	0	5	–	4	–	0
Michigan	3	–	3	–	1	5	–	3	–	1
Illinois	3	–	4	–	0	4	–	5	–	0
Minnesota	3	–	5	–	0	4	–	5	–	0
Indiana	0	–	6	–	0	1	–	8	–	0
Northwestern	0	–	7	–	0	0	–	9	–	0
$ – Conference champion; Rankings from AP Poll

The 1957 Minnesota Golden Gophers football team represented the University of Minnesota in the 1957 Big Ten Conference football season. In their fourth year under head coach Murray Warmath, the Golden Gophers compiled a 4–5 record and outscored their opponents by a combined total of 201 to 188.

Quarterback Dick Larson received the team's Most Valuable Player award. Fullback Dick Borstad, offensive lineman Perry Gehring and offensive lineman Mike Svendsen were named Academic All-Big Ten.

Total attendance at five home games was 314,769, an average of 62,953. The largest crowd was against Purdue.

== Schedule ==
Date	Opponent	Rank	Site	Result	Attendance	Source
September 28	Washington*	No. 6	Memorial Stadium; Minneapolis, MN	W 46–7	63,512	
October 5	Purdue	No. 3	Memorial Stadium; Minneapolis, MN	W 21–17	65,605	
October 12	at Northwestern	No. 4	Dyche Stadium; Evanston, IL	W 41–6	38,000	
October 19	at Illinois	No. 4	Memorial Stadium; Champaign, IL	L 13–34	69,619	
October 26	No. 20 Michigan	No. 14	Memorial Stadium; Minneapolis, MN (Little Brown Jug)	L 7–24	64,680	
November 2	Indiana^{†}		Memorial Stadium; Minneapolis, MN	W 34–0	63,206	
November 9	at No. 5 Iowa		Iowa Stadium; Iowa City, IA (rivalry)	L 20–44	58,103	
November 16	at No. 4 Michigan State		Spartan Stadium; East Lansing, MI	L 13–42	65,718	
November 23	No. 18 Wisconsin		Memorial Stadium; Minneapolis, MN (rivalry)	L 6–14	62,939	
*Non-conference game; ^{†}Homecoming; Rankings from AP Poll released prior to the game; Source:
