= 1957 Ohio State Buckeyes football team =

American college football season

1957 Ohio State Buckeyes football
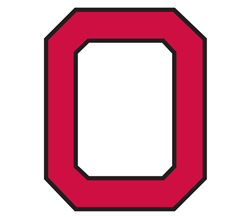

Coaches' Poll national champion FWAA national champion Zuppke Award Big Ten champion Rose Bowl champion

Rose Bowl, W 10–7 vs. Oregon
- Conference: Big Ten Conference

Ranking
- Coaches: No. 1
- AP: No. 2
- Record: 9–1 (7–0 Big Ten)
- Head coach: Woody Hayes (7th season)
- Offensive scheme: Heavy run
- Base defense: Multiple
- MVP: Bill Jobko
- Captains: Leo Brown; Galen Cisco
- Home stadium: Ohio Stadium

1957 Big Ten Conference football standings
	Conf.					Overall
Team	W		L		T	W		L		T
No. 2 Ohio State $	7	–	0	–	0	9	–	1	–	0
No. 3 Michigan State	5	–	1	–	0	8	–	1	–	0
No. 6 Iowa	4	–	1	–	1	7	–	1	–	1
No. 19 Wisconsin	4	–	3	–	0	6	–	3	–	0
Purdue	4	–	3	–	0	5	–	4	–	0
Michigan	3	–	3	–	1	5	–	3	–	1
Illinois	3	–	4	–	0	4	–	5	–	0
Minnesota	3	–	5	–	0	4	–	5	–	0
Indiana	0	–	6	–	0	1	–	8	–	0
Northwestern	0	–	7	–	0	0	–	9	–	0
$ – Conference champion; Rankings from AP Poll

The 1957 Ohio State Buckeyes football team represented the Ohio State University in the 1957 Big Ten Conference football season. The team was led by captains Galen Cisco and Leo Brown. They were the third national title team in Ohio State football history. They were coached by Hall of Fame coach Woody Hayes. The Buckeyes were awarded the title by the UPI Coaches Poll and represented the Big Ten Conference in the Rose Bowl.

The Buckeyes finished the 1956 season with a two shut-out losses to Iowa and Michigan. Going into the 1957 season fans had a feeling of rebuilding. The feeling was made stronger with an opening loss to unranked TCU. To make matters worse, Michigan State, Minnesota, Michigan and Iowa were all ranked in the Top 6 of the AP Poll Rankings while Ohio State would not be ranked until late October. Coach Hayes rallied the team every week and made them better following this loss.

The Buckeyes came back with a big win at Washington and victories over Illinois, Wisconsin and Purdue, along with crushing victories over Indiana and Northwestern. A shocking Purdue upset over #2 Michigan State, a tie between Michigan and Iowa, and Minnesota’s unraveling season after a loss to Illinois continued to help the Buckeyes.

It was a late star performance by sophomore fullback Bob White against unbeaten Iowa that pushed the team even further. Trailing 13–10 and on their own 32-yard line, White ran on six of the eight plays for 66 out of the 68 yards, capped off by a 5-yard touchdown run.

A victory over Michigan moved Ohio State up to #2 in the AP, behind undefeated Auburn. However, the UPI Coaches' poll voted OSU #1 and Auburn #2 as the Tigers were on probation.

In a hard fought Rose Bowl game, a late field goal by Don Sutherin in the fourth quarter sealed the victory over the Oregon Ducks.

Following the season's bowls, the Buckeyes were voted No. 1 by the Football Writers Association of America and awarded the Grantland Rice Award representative of the national championship.

== Schedule ==
Date	Opponent	Rank	Site	TV	Result	Attendance	Source
September 28	TCU*		Ohio Stadium; Columbus, OH		L 14–18	81,784	
October 5	at Washington*		Husky Stadium; Seattle, WA		W 35–7	37,500	
October 12	Illinois		Ohio Stadium; Columbus, OH (Illibuck)	NBC	W 21–7	82,239	
October 19	Indiana		Ohio Stadium; Columbus, OH		W 56–0	78,348	
October 26	at Wisconsin	No. 12	Camp Randall Stadium; Madison, WI		W 16–13	50,051	
November 2	Northwestern	No. 8	Ohio Stadium; Columbus, OH		W 47–6	79,635	
November 9	Purdue	No. 6	Ohio Stadium; Columbus, OH		W 20–7	79,177	
November 16	No. 5 Iowa	No. 6	Ohio Stadium; Columbus, OH		W 17–13	82,935	
November 23	at No. 19 Michigan	No. 3	Michigan Stadium; Ann Arbor, MI (rivalry)		W 31–14	101,001	
January 1, 1958	vs. Oregon*	No. 2	Rose Bowl; Pasadena, CA (Rose Bowl)	NBC	W 10–7	98,202	
*Non-conference game; Rankings from AP Poll released prior to the game; Source:

== Game summaries ==
=== TCU ===
Team	1	2	3	4	Total
• TCU	6	6	6	0	18
Ohio State	7	7	0	0	14

- Date: September 28
- Location: Ohio Stadium
- Game attendance: 81,784
- Game weather: Clear, 62 °F (17 °C)

Scoring summary
Q1	TCU	Lasater 7 yard run (kick failed)	TCU 0–6
Q1	OSU	LeBeau 1 yard run (Sutherin kick)	OSU 7–6
Q2	TCU	Shofner 90 yard punt return (kick failed)	TCU 7–12
Q2	OSU	Clark 2 yard run (Sutherin kick)	OSU 14–12
Q3	TCU	Spikes 16 yard run (kick failed)	TCU 14–18

Team Statistics
Stat	Ohio State	TCU
Pass Atts.	3	3
Pass Comps.	2	0
Pass Yards	20	0
Yds./Pass	10	0
Rush Atts.	62	54
Rush Yards	242	184
Yds./Rush	3.9	3.4
Total Yards	262	184
Fumbles Lost	2	1
INTs Lost	0	1
Total Turnovers	2	2

=== At Washington ===
Team	1	2	3	4	Total
• Ohio State	0	7	14	14	35
Washington	0	7	0	0	7

- Date: October 5
- Location: Husky Stadium, Seattle, WA
- Game attendance: 37,500

Scoring summary
Q2	WASH	Dunn 1 yard run (Dunn kick)	WASH 7–0
Q2	OHST	Kremblas 1 yard run (Sutherin kick)	Tie 7–7
Q3	OHST	Sutherin 81 yard punt return (Sutherin kick)	OHST 14–7
Q3	OHST	Cisco 7 yard run (Sutherin kick)	OHST 21–7
Q4	OHST	LeBeau 9 yard pass from Clark (Sutherin kick)	OHST 28–7
Q4	OHST	Connazino 1 yard run (Spychalski kick)	OHST 35–7

=== Illinois ===
Team	1	2	3	4	Total
Illinois	0	0	7	0	7
• Ohio State	7	0	7	7	21

- Date: October 12
- Location: Ohio Stadium
- Game attendance: 82,239
- Game weather: Clear, 60 °F (16 °C)

Scoring summary
Q1	OSU	Clark 9 yard run (Sutherin kick)	OSU 7–0
Q3	ILL	Haller 58 yard pass to Kreitling (Haller kick)	TIED 7–7
Q3	OSU	Kremblas 1 yard run (Sutherin kick)	OSU 14–7
Q4	OSU	Kremblas 6 yard pass to Sutherin (Sutherin kick)	OSU 21–7

=== Indiana ===
Team	1	2	3	4	Total
Indiana	0	0	0	0	0
• Ohio State	14	23	12	7	56

- Date: October 19
- Location: Ohio Stadium
- Game attendance: 78,348
- Game weather: Clear, 50 °F (10 °C)

=== At Wisconsin ===
Team	1	2	3	4	Total
• Ohio State	13	0	3	0	16
Wisconsin	13	0	0	0	13

- Date: October 26
- Location: Camp Randall Stadium, Madison, WI
- Game attendance: 50,051
- Game weather: Cloudy, wind 10-15 mph, 35 °F (2 °C)

=== Northwestern ===
Team	1	2	3	4	Total
Northwestern	0	0	0	6	6
• Ohio State	6	14	13	14	47

- Date: November 2
- Location: Ohio Stadium
- Game attendance: 79,635
- Game weather: Clear, 65 °F (18 °C)

=== Purdue ===
Team	1	2	3	4	Total
Purdue	6	0	7	0	13
• Ohio State	3	7	0	7	17

- Date: November 16
- Location: Ohio Stadium
- Game attendance: 82,935
- Game weather: Clear, 60 °F (16 °C)

Scoring summary
Q1	OSU	Sutherin 18 y ard field goal	OSU 3–0
Q1	IOWA	Duncan 8 yard pass to Prescott (kick failed)	IOWA 3–6
Q2	OSU	Kremblas 1 yard run (Sutherin kick)	OSU 10–6
Q3	IOWA	Duncan 1 yard run (Prescott kick)	IOWA 10–13
Q4	OSU	White 5 yard run (Sutherin kick)	OSU 17–13

=== Iowa ===
Team	1	2	3	4	Total
Iowa	6	0	7	0	13
• Ohio State	3	7	0	7	17

- Date: November 16
- Location: Ohio Stadium
- Game attendance: 82,935
- Game weather: Clear, 60 °F (16 °C)

Scoring summary
Q1	OSU	Sutherin 18 yard field goal	OSU 3–0
Q1	IOWA	Duncan 8 yard pass to Prescott (kick failed)	IOWA 6–3
Q2	OSU	Kremblas 1 yard run (Sutherin kick)	OSU 10–6
Q3	IOWA	Duncan 1 yard run (Prescott kick)	IOWA 13–10
Q4	OSU	White 5 yard run (Sutherin kick)	OSU 17–13

=== At Michigan ===
Team	1	2	3	4	Total
• Ohio State	7	3	14	7	31
Michigan	7	7	0	0	14

- Date: November 23
- Location: Michigan Stadium, Ann Arbor, MI
- Game attendance: 100,101
- Game weather: Cloudy

Scoring summary
1	MICH	Jim Pace 16-yard run (Jim Van Pelt kick)	MICH 7-0
1	OSU	Dick LeBeau 5-yard run (Don Sutherin kick)	Tied 7-7
2	OSU	Don Sutherin 32-yard field goal	OSU 10-7
2	MICH	Brad Myers 25-yard pass from Jim Van Pelt (Jim Van Pelt kick)	MICH 14-10
3	OSU	Dick LeBeau 8-yard run (Frank Kremblas kick)	OSU 17-14
3	OSU	Frank Kremblas 16-yard run (Frank Kremblas kick)	OSU 24-14
4	OSU	Joe Cannavino 13 yard lateral from Frank Kremblas (Frank Kremblas kick)	OSU 31-14

Ohio State played without halfback Don Clark, who was sidelined with a groin injury.

=== Vs. Oregon (Rose Bowl) ===
Team	1	2	3	4	Total
• Ohio State	7	0	0	3	10
Oregon	0	7	0	0	7

- Date: January 1
- Location: Rose Bowl, Pasadena, CA
- Game attendance: 98,202
- TV announcers (NBC): Chick Hearn and Mel Allen

Scoring summary
1	OSU	Frank Kremblas 1-yard run (Don Sutherin kick)	OSU 7-0
2	OREG	Jim Shanley 5-yard run (Jack Morris kick)	Tied 7-7
4	OSU	Don Sutherin 34-yard field goal	OSU 10-7

== Roster ==
1957 Ohio State Buckeyes football team roster
Players
Coaches
Offense

Pos.	#	Name	Class
OL		Tom Baldacci
RB		Gerry Ballinger
WR		Russ Bowermaster
WR		Leo Brown
RB		Joe Cannavino
RB		Leroy Carr
RB		Galen Cisco
RB		Don Clark
OL		Al Crawford
QB	23	Thomas Crawford	Sr
RB		John Dresser
FB	34	Len Fontes	So
OL		Dan Fronk
RB		Ralph Gage
WR		Jim Houston
OL		Bill Jobko
QB	22	Frank Kremblas	Jr
HB	44	Dick LeBeau	Jr
WR		Rich Michael
WR		Thomas Morgan
QB		Andrew Okulovich
RB		Russell Provenza
RB		Philip Robinson
QB		Jim Samuels
OL		Dick Schafrath
OL		Aurealius Thomas
RB		Joseph Trivisonno
RB		Bill Wentz
FB		Bob White	So
RB		Dave Zuhars

Defense

Pos.	#	Name	Class
OL		Jim Marshall
DB		Don Sutherin	Sr

Special teams

Pos.	#	Name	Class
K		Don Sutherin	Sr

Head coach

- Woody Hayes

Coordinators/assistant coaches

Legend

- (C) Team captain
- (S) Suspended
- (I) Ineligible
- Injured
- Redshirt

Roster

== Awards and honors ==
- All-American: Aurealius Thomas, G
- All-Big Ten: Aurealius Thomas, G, Leo Brown, E
- Team MVP: Bill Jobko, G

== 1958 NFL draftees ==
Player	Round	Pick	Position	NFL club
Bill Jobko	7	80	Linebacker	Los Angeles Rams
Don Sutherin	8	94	Defensive back	New York Giants
Russ Bowermaster	11	132	End	Cleveland Browns
