= Willmer Fowler =

American football player (born 1937)

No. 23
- Position: Halfback

Personal information
- Born: June 3, 1937 (age 89); Andalusia, Alabama, U.S.
- Listed height: 5 ft 10 in (1.78 m)
- Listed weight: 185 lb (84 kg)

Career information
- High school: Mansfield (Mansfield, Ohio)
- College: Northwestern
- NFL draft: 1959: 8th round, 86th overall pick

Career history
- Buffalo Bills (1960–1961)

Career AFL statistics
- Rushing yards: 372
- Rushing average: 4
- Receptions: 10
- Receiving yards: 99
- Total touchdowns: 1
- Stats at Pro Football Reference

Willmer L. Fowler (born June 3, 1937) is an American former professional football player who played for the Buffalo Bills. He played college football at Northwestern University.

Drafted, but not signed by the Philadelphia Eagles, Fowler caught on with the Bills in the American Football League (AFL), where he made their inaugural roster and became the team's starting halfback, becoming the first Bill to rush for 100 yards in a single game. A ruptured Achilles tendon in 1961 ended his playing career.

Fowler served in the National Guard from 1960 to 1981, retiring with the rank of captain. He also worked for IBM, and, until his retirement in 2017, was the director of the Erie County pistol permit office.
