= Collins Hagler =

American gridiron football player (born 1935)

Profile
- Position: Halfback

Personal information
- Born: May 15, 1935 (age 91); Washington, D.C., U.S.
- Listed height: 5 ft 9 in (1.75 m)
- Listed weight: 163 lb (74 kg)

Career history
- 1958–1959: Saskatchewan Roughriders
- 1960: Ottawa Rough Riders

Awards and highlights
- Grey Cup champion (1960)

Collins "Mike" Hagler (born March 15, 1935) was an American professional football player who played for the Saskatchewan Roughriders and Ottawa Rough Riders. He won the Grey Cup with Ottawa in 1960. He played college football for the University of Iowa.
