= Jim Gibbons (American football) =

American football player (1936–2016)

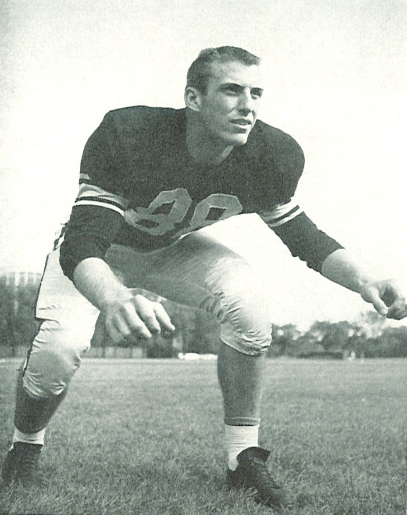
- Gibbons from 1958 Hawkeye

No. 87, 80
- Positions: End, tight end

Personal information
- Born: September 26, 1936; Chicago, Illinois, U.S.
- Died: August 20, 2016 (aged 79); Carlsbad, California, U.S.
- Listed height: 6 ft 2 in (1.88 m)
- Listed weight: 220 lb (100 kg)

Career information
- College: Iowa
- NFL draft: 1958: 5th round, 61st overall pick

Career history
- Cleveland Browns (1958)*; Detroit Lions (1958–1968)
- * Offseason or practice squad member only

Awards and highlights
- 3× Pro Bowl (1960, 1961, 1964); First-team All-American (1957); First-team All-Big Ten (1957)

Career NFL statistics
- Receptions: 287
- Receiving yards: 3,561
- Touchdowns: 20
- Stats at Pro Football Reference

James Edwin Gibbons (September 26, 1936 – August 20, 2016) was an American professional football tight end for the National Football League (NFL)'s Detroit Lions from 1958 to 1968.

== Early life ==
Gibbons was born in Chicago, Illinois. He attended the University of Iowa, where he played on teams with future Detroit Lion teammate Alex Karras.

He earned All-American and All-Big 10 honors as a senior and Hawkeye team captain in 1957. In a 1957 game against Minnesota he caught nine passes for 164 yards and two touchdowns in a 44-20 Iowa victory.

In the 1957 Rose Bowl, Gibbons was a starter on the #3-ranked Iowa team that defeated #10-ranked Oregon State 35-19, catching a 16-yard pass from quarterback and the game's MVP Ken Ploen. His touchdown catch in a home game against Ohio State on November 10, 1956, was the lone score in the game and clinched the Rose Bowl appearance and at least a tie for the Big Ten championship (which the team went on to win) for Iowa as the #7-ranked Hawkeyes defeated the #6-ranked Buckeyes, 6-0.

== Professional career ==
Gibbons and Karras were two of seven Hawkeyes selected by NFL teams in the 1958 NFL draft; Karras was the 10th player chosen as the Lions' #1 pick. Gibbons was selected in the sixth round by the Cleveland Browns. The 6'3", 220-pound tight end spent all of training camp with Cleveland and had impressed the coaching staff. However, three days prior to the first regular season game, the Browns acquired punter Dick Deschaine from the Green Bay Packers. To make room on the roster, Gibbons was traded to the Lions in exchange for a fifth round draft pick in 1960. Cleveland used that pick to acquire guard John Wooten, a two-time All-Pro who started for the Browns through the 1967 season.

Gibbons blossomed as a key part of the Lions' offense for the next seven seasons, playing with the club 11 years overall. He earned Pro Bowl honors three-times during his career, after the 1960, 1961 and 1964 seasons. He had a career year in 1964, earning Lion MVP honors, catching 45 passes for 605 yards and 8 touchdowns. Also in 1964, Gibbons set the Lions record for receiving yards in a game by a tight end, with 161 yards on December 13 against the San Francisco 49ers. The record stood until 2022, when it was broken by T. J. Hockenson's 179 yards against the Seattle Seahawks.

As of 2018, Gibbons ranks tenth on the Lions' all-time reception list with 287 receptions, 3,561 yards and 20 touchdowns. Selected to three Pro Bowls, one career highlight came in a 1960 game versus the Baltimore Colts in Baltimore. Gibbons scored the game winning touchdown on a 65-yard pass from quarterback Earl Morrall as time expired, giving the Lions a 20–15 victory. It was the game's third lead change in the last 15 seconds of play.

Gibbons died on August 20, 2016, at the age of 79 of natural causes. Gibbons' brain was donated to Boston University for research on chronic traumatic encephalopathy (CTE), a neurological disorder observed in professional athletes with repeat brain trauma.

== NFL career statistics ==
Legend
**Bold**	Career high

Year	Team	Games		Receiving				
Year	Team	GP	GS	Rec	Yds	Avg	Lng	TD
1958	DET	12	7	25	367	14.7	35	2
1959	DET	12	11	31	431	13.9	38	1
1960	DET	12	10	**51**	604	11.8	65	2
1961	DET	14	13	45	566	12.6	36	1
1962	DET	14	14	33	318	9.6	22	2
1963	DET	14	14	32	412	12.9	32	1
1964	DET	14	14	45	**605**	13.4	**82**	**8**
1965	DET	13	6	12	111	9.3	24	2
1966	DET	7	0	1	2	2.0	2	1
1967	DET	14	4	10	107	10.7	21	0
1968	DET	14	0	2	38	**19.0**	20	0
		140	93	287	3,561	12.4	82	20
