= List of Navy Midshipmen bowl games =

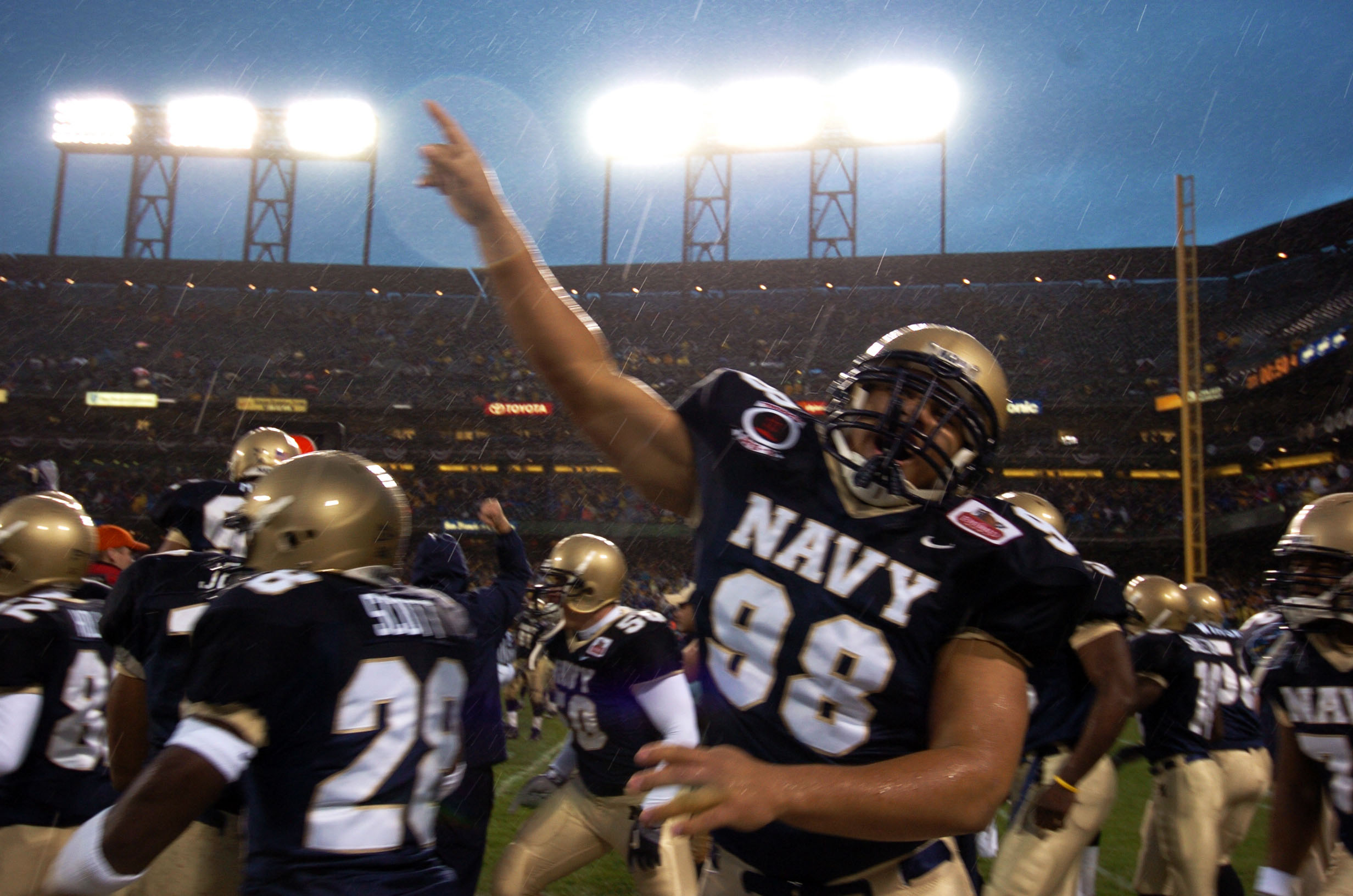
A player celebrates after the Midshipmen win the 2004 Emerald Bowl.

The Navy Midshipmen college football team competes as part of the National Collegiate Athletic Association (NCAA) Division I Football Bowl Subdivision (FBS), representing United States Naval Academy in the American Athletic Conference (AAC). Since the first season in 1879, Navy has appeared in 26. Through the history of the program, Navy had the most bowl games with coach Ken Niumatalolo having the most appearances with eleven. The Midshipmen have a bowl record of 14–11–1 (.558) through the 2025 season.

== Key ==
General
†	Bowl game record attendance
‡	Former bowl game record attendance
*	De facto national championship game

Results
W	Win
L	Loss
T	Tie

== Bowl games ==
List of bowl games showing bowl played in, score, date, season, opponent, stadium, location, attendance and head coach (Note: Statistics correct as of 2011–12 season.)
#	Bowl	Score (Note: Results are sortable first by whether the result was a Navy win, loss or tie and then second by the margin of victory.)	Date	Season (Note: Links to the season article for the Navy team that competed in the bowl for that year when available or to their general page when unavailable.)	Opponent (Note: Links to the season article for the opponent that Navy competed against in the bowl for that year when available or to their general page when unavailable.)	Stadium	Location	Attendance	Head coach
1	Rose Bowl	T 14–14	January 1, 1924	1923	Washington Huskies	Rose Bowl (stadium)	Pasadena	40,000	Bob Folwell
2	Sugar Bowl	W 21–0	January 1, 1955	1954	Ole Miss Rebels	Tulane Stadium	New Orleans	83,000	Eddie Erdelatz
3	Cotton Bowl Classic	W 20–7	January 1, 1958	1957	Rice Owls	Cotton Bowl	Dallas	75,500	Eddie Erdelatz
4	Orange Bowl	L 14–21	January 2, 1961	1960	Missouri Tigers	Miami Orange Bowl	Miami	71,218	Wayne Hardin
5	Cotton Bowl Classic*	L 6–28	January 1, 1964	1963	Texas Longhorns	Cotton Bowl	Dallas	75,504	Wayne Hardin
6	Holiday Bowl	W 23–16	December 22, 1978	1978	BYU Cougars	San Diego Stadium	San Diego	52,500^{‡} (Note: This was the inaugural Holiday Bowl, therefore giving it the highest recorded attendance at the time.)	George Welsh
7	Garden State Bowl	L 0–35	December 14, 1980	1980	Houston Cougars	Giants Stadium	East Rutherford	41,417^{†} (Note: The Garden State Bowl was last held in 1981. The attendance for the 1980 bowl remains the record.)	George Welsh
8	Liberty Bowl	L 28–31	December 30, 1981	1981	Ohio State Buckeyes	Liberty Bowl Memorial Stadium	Memphis	43,216	George Welsh
9	Aloha Bowl	W 42–38	December 25, 1996	1996	California Golden Bears	Aloha Stadium	Honolulu	30,411	Charlie Weatherbie
10	Houston Bowl	L 14–38	December 30, 2003	2003	Texas Tech Red Raiders	Reliant Stadium	Houston	51,068	Paul Johnson
11	Emerald Bowl	W 34–19	December 30, 2004	2004	New Mexico Lobos	SBC Park	San Francisco	30,563^{‡} (Note: Surpassed by the 2006 Emerald Bowl.)	Paul Johnson
12	Poinsettia Bowl	W 51–30	December 22, 2005	2005	Colorado State Rams	Qualcomm Stadium	San Diego	36,842^{‡} (Note: This was the inaugural Poinsettia Bowl, therefore giving it the highest recorded attendance at the time.)	Paul Johnson
13	Meineke Car Care Bowl	L 24–25	December 30, 2006	2006	Boston College Eagles	Bank of America Stadium	Charlotte	52,303	Paul Johnson
14	Poinsettia Bowl	L 32–35	December 20, 2007	2007	Utah Utes	Qualcomm Stadium	San Diego	39,129^{‡}	Ken Niumatalolo (Note: Paul Johnson held the position of head coach at Navy until he was hired as the new head coach of the Georgia Tech Yellow Jackets prior to the 2007 Poinsettia Bowl. The school promoted Ken Niumatalolo to interim head coach and then made the position permanent prior to the bowl game.)
15	EagleBank Bowl	L 19–29	December 20, 2008	2008	Wake Forest	Robert F. Kennedy Memorial Stadium	Washington, D.C.	28,777^{‡} (Note: This was the inaugural EagleBank Bowl, therefore giving it the highest recorded attendance at the time.)	Ken Niumatalolo
16	Texas Bowl	W 35–13	December 31, 2009	2009	Missouri Tigers	Reliant Stadium	Houston	69,441^{†}	Ken Niumatalolo
17	Poinsettia Bowl	L 14–35	December 23, 2010	2010	San Diego State Aztecs	Qualcomm Stadium	San Diego	48,049^{†}	Ken Niumatalolo
18	Fight Hunger Bowl	L 28–62	December 29, 2012	2012	Arizona State Sun Devils	AT&T Park	San Francisco	34,172	Ken Niumatalolo
19	Armed Forces Bowl	W 24–6	December 30, 2013	2013	Middle Tennessee State Blue Raiders	Amon G. Carter Stadium	Fort Worth	39,246	Ken Niumatalolo
20	Poinsettia Bowl	W 17–16	December 23, 2014	2014	San Diego State Aztecs	Qualcomm Stadium	San Diego	33,077	Ken Niumatalolo
21	Military Bowl	W 44–28	December 28, 2015	2015	Pittsburgh Panthers	Navy–Marine Corps Memorial Stadium	Annapolis, Maryland	36,352	Ken Niumatalolo
22	Armed Forces Bowl	L 45–48	December 23, 2016	2016	Louisiana Tech	Amon G. Carter Stadium	Fort Worth	40,542	Ken Niumatalolo
23	Military Bowl	W 49–7	December 28, 2017	2017	Virginia Cavaliers	Navy–Marine Corps Memorial Stadium	Annapolis	35,921	Ken Niumatalolo
24	Liberty Bowl	W 20–17	December 31, 2019	2019	Kansas State Wildcats	Liberty Bowl Memorial Stadium	Memphis	50,515	Ken Niumatalolo
25	Armed Forces Bowl	W 21–20	December 27, 2024	2024	Oklahoma Sooners	Amon G. Carter Stadium	Fort Worth	50,754^{†}	Brian Newberry
26	Liberty Bowl	W 35–13	January 2, 2026	2025	Cincinnati Bearcats	Liberty Bowl Memorial Stadium	Memphis	21,908	Brian Newberry

== Record by bowl game ==
Bowl Game	#	W	L	T	%
Poinsettia Bowl	4	2	2	0	.500
Armed Forces Bowl	3	2	1	0	.667
Military Bowl (EagleBank Bowl)	3	2	1	0	.667
San Francisco Bowl (Kraft Fight Hunger Bowl) (Emerald Bowl)	2	1	1	0	.500
Cotton Bowl Classic	2	1	1	0	.500
Liberty Bowl	3	2	1	0	.667
Rose Bowl	1	0	0	1	.500
Sugar Bowl	1	1	0	0	1.000
Orange Bowl	1	0	1	0	.000
Texas Bowl	1	1	0	0	1.000
Duke's Mayo Bowl (Meineke Car Care Bowl)	1	0	1	0	.000
Holiday Bowl	1	1	0	0	1.000
Garden State Bowl	1	0	1	0	.000
Aloha Bowl	1	1	0	0	1.000
Houston Bowl	1	0	1	0	.000
