= 1957 All-Eastern football team =

American all-star college football team

The 1957 All-Eastern football team consists of American football players chosen by various selectors as the best players at each position among the Eastern colleges and universities during the 1957 college football season.

Four players were unanimous first-team picks by the Associated Press (AP), United Press (UP), and International News Service (INS): backs Tom Forrestal of Navy and Bob Anderson of Army; tackle Jim McCusker of Pittsburgh; and guard Joe Palermo of Dartmouth. Anderson was also a consensus first-team All-American and was later inducted into the College Football Hall of Fame.

The 1957 Navy Midshipmen football team won the Lambert Trophy and was ranked No. 5 in the final AP Poll. Four Navy players received first-team All-Eastern honors: Forrestal; end Pete Jokanovich; tackle Bob Reifsnyder; and guard Tony Stremic.

== Backs ==
- Tom Forrestal, Navy (AP-1 [qb], UP-1, INS-1)
- Bob Anderson, Army (AP-1 [hb], UP-1, INS-1)
- Bill Austin, Rutgers (AP-1, UP-2, INS-2)
- John Sapoch, Princeton (AP-1, UP-3)
- Pete Dawkins, Army (UP-1)
- Tom Greene, Holy Cross (AP-2, UP-1)
- Dave Kasperian, Penn State (AP-2, UP-3, INS-1)
- Gene Coker, Yale (AP-2, UP-2, INS-1)
- Ned Oldham, Navy (AP-2, UP-2)
- Don Allard, Boston College (UP-2)
- Jim Burke, Dartmouth (INS-2)
- Vince Barta, Army (INS-2)
- Dan Nolan, Lehigh (UP-2, INS-2)
- Ed Coffin, Syracuse (UP-3)

== Ends ==
- Les Walters, Penn State (AP-1, UP-1)
- Dick Lasse, Syracuse (UP-1, INS-1)
- Michael Cavallon, Yale (AP-1, UP-3)
- Pete Jokanovich, Navy (AP-2, UP-2, INS-1)
- Al Jamison, Colgate (AP-2, UP-2)
- Jim Stansbury, Princeton (INS-2)
- Dick Scherer, Pittsburgh (INS-2)
- Dave Moss, Dartmouth (UP-3)

== Tackles ==
- Jim McCusker, Pittsburgh (AP-1, UP-1, INS-1)
- Bob Reifsnyder, Navy (AP-1, UP-1, INS-2)
- Pete Williams, Lehigh (UP-3, INS-1)
- Llewellyn Williams, Lehigh (AP-2)
- Ron Luciano, Syracuse (AP-2)
- Robert Casciola, Princeton (UP-2)
- Don Luzzi, Villanova (UP-2)
- Ralph Antone, Colgate (INS-2)
- Bill Melnik, Army (UP-3)

== Guards ==
- Joe Palermo, Dartmouth (AP-1, UP-1, INS-1)
- Tom Meehan, Boston College (AP-1)
- Tony Stremic, Navy (UP-1)
- Dick Carr, Pittsburgh (INS-1)
- John Guzik, Pitt (AP-2)
- Stan Slater, Army (AP-2, UP-3)
- Joseph G. Sabol, Penn State (UP-2)
- Bob Novogratz, Army (INS-2)
- Jim Healy, Holy Cross (UP-2, INS-2)
- Lou Mooradian, Connecticut (UP-3)

== Center ==
- Jim Kernan, Army (AP-1, UP-2, INS-1)
- Charlie Brueckman, Pittsburgh (AP-2, UP-1, INS-2)
- Don Warburton, Brown (UP-3)

== Key ==
- AP = Associated Press
- UP = United Press
- INS = International News Service

== See also ==
- 1957 College Football All-America Team
