= Tom Forrestal =

American football player (born 1936)

- Forrestal in Navy, 1960

No. 18
- Position: Quarterback

Personal information
- Born: October 23, 1936 (age 90); Ohio, U.S.

Career information
- College: United States Naval Academy (1955–1957)

Awards and highlights
- First-team All-American (1957); First-team All-Eastern (1957); Outstanding back, 1958 Cotton Bowl Classic

Thomas Patrick Forrestal Jr. (born October 23, 1936) is an American former football player. He played quarterback for the Navy Midshipmen football teams from 1955 to 1957. He led the 1957 team to the Eastern and Cotton Bowl championships, won first-team All-America honors, and finished fifth in the Heisman Trophy voting.

== Early life ==
Forrestal was born in 1936. He grew up in Cleveland, Ohio, and attended St. Ignatius High School there.

Forrestal was St. Ignatius' starting quarterback for the St. Ignatius football team in 1952 and 1953, winning all-scholastic honors both years. In 1952, he tallied 1,511 yards of total offense (1,263 passing and 248 rushing). In December 1960, he was selected as the all-time best player in St. Ignatius school history.

== Navy ==
Forrestal then enrolled at the United States Naval Academy where he played college football at the quarterback position for the Navy Midshipmen football team from 1955 to 1957.

As a senior, he completed 80 of 159 passes (50.3%) for 1,117 yards with eight touchdowns and 17 touchdowns and finished fifth in the Heisman Trophy voting. He led the 1957 Navy Midshipmen football team to a 9–1–1 record, the Eastern championships, and the No. 5 ranking in the final AP poll. At the end of the season, he was selected by the International News Service as a first-team player on its 1957 College Football All-America Team. He was also selected by the Cleveland Touchdown Club as the outstanding college player of 1958. He was selected as the outstanding back in the 1958 Cotton Bowl Classic and was credited with playing "one of the top games of Cotton Bowl history."

== Later life ==
Forrestal was selected by the Baltimore Colts in the 20th round (237th overall pick) of the 1958 NFL draft. He served in the Navy after graduating from Annapolis and was married in 1960 to Linda McCormick.
