= Bob Reifsnyder =

American football player (born 1937)

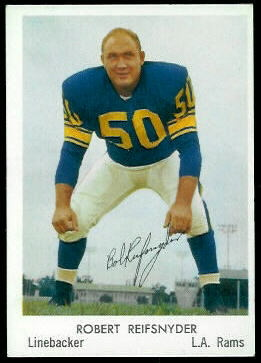
- Reifsnyder in 1959

No. 79
- Position: Defensive end

Personal information
- Born: June 18, 1937 (age 89); Brooklyn, New York, U.S.
- Listed height: 6 ft 2 in (1.88 m)
- Listed weight: 250 lb (113 kg)

Career information
- High school: Baldwin (Baldwin, New York)
- College: Navy (1956–1958)
- NFL draft: 1959: 4th round, 45th overall pick

Career history
- Los Angeles Rams (1959)*; Los Angeles Chargers (1960)*; New York Titans (1960–1961)
- * Offseason or practice squad member only

Awards and highlights
- Eastern champion (1957); Maxwell Award (1957); First-team All-American (1957); First-team All-Eastern (1957); Second-team All-Eastern (1956)

Career AFL statistics
- Games played: 16
- Games started: 12
- Sacks: 3
- Stats at Pro Football Reference
- College Football Hall of Fame

Robert Harland Reifsnyder (born June 18, 1937) is an American former professional football player who was a defensive end in the American Football League (AFL) for the New York Titans from 1960 to 1961. He played college football for the Navy Midshipmen, where he was named to the All-American team and won the Maxwell Award in 1957. Reifsnyder was inducted into the College Football Hall of Fame in 1997.

== Coaching career ==
He coached high school football for the Bisons of Alfred G. Berner High School, where actor Alec Baldwin was one of his players.

== See also ==
- List of American Football League players
