= 1957 SMU Mustangs football team =

American college football season

1957 SMU Mustangs football
- Conference: Southwest Conference
- Record: 4–5–1 (3–3 SWC)
- Head coach: Bill Meek (1st season)
- Captains: Ray Masters; Jerry Cornelison
- Home stadium: Cotton Bowl

1957 Southwest Conference football standings
	Conf.					Overall
Team	W		L		T	W		L		T
No. 8 Rice $	5	–	1	–	0	7	–	4	–	0
No. 11 Texas	4	–	1	–	1	6	–	4	–	1
No. 9 Texas A&M	4	–	2	–	0	8	–	3	–	0
SMU	3	–	3	–	0	4	–	5	–	1
Arkansas	2	–	4	–	0	6	–	4	–	0
TCU	2	–	4	–	0	5	–	4	–	1
Baylor	0	–	5	–	1	3	–	6	–	1
$ – Conference champion; Rankings from AP Poll

The 1957 SMU Mustangs football team represented Southern Methodist University (SMU) as a member of the Southwest Conference (SWC) during the 1957 college football season. Led by first-year head coach Bill Meek, the Mustangs compiled an overall record of 4–5–1 with a conference mark of 3–3, placing fourth in the SWC.

== Schedule ==
Date	Opponent	Rank	Site	Result	Attendance	Source
September 21	at California*		California Memorial Stadium; Berkeley, CA	W 13–6	45,000	
September 28	at No. 3 Georgia Tech*	No. 15	Grant Field; Atlanta, GA	T 0–0	30,000	
October 11	Missouri*		Cotton Bowl; Dallas, TX	L 6–7	26,500	
October 19	No. 19 Rice		Cotton Bowl; Dallas, TX (rivalry)	L 21–27	36,000	
November 2	No. 13 Texas		Cotton Bowl; Dallas, TX	W 19–12	42,000	
November 9	at No. 1 Texas A&M		Kyle Field; College Station, TX	L 6–19	28,000	
November 16	Arkansas		Cotton Bowl; Dallas, TX	W 27–22	25,500	
November 23	at Baylor		Baylor Stadium; Waco, TX	W 14–7	15,000	
November 30	at TCU		Amon G. Carter Stadium; Fort Worth, TX (rivalry)	L 0–21	25,000	
December 7	No. 10 Notre Dame*		Cotton Bowl; Dallas, TX	L 21–54	51,000	
*Non-conference game; Rankings from AP Poll released prior to the game
