= Charlie Brueckman =

American football player (1935–2026)

No. 56, 53
- Position: Linebacker

Personal information
- Born: November 23, 1935; McKees Rocks, Pennsylvania, U.S.
- Died: July 20, 2026 (aged 90)
- Listed height: 6 ft 2 in (1.88 m)
- Listed weight: 223 lb (101 kg)

Career information
- High school: Sto-Rox (McKees Rocks)
- College: Pittsburgh
- NFL draft: 1957: 9th round, 104th overall pick

Career history
- Washington Redskins (1958); New York Giants (1959)*; Los Angeles Chargers (1960)
- * Offseason or practice squad member only

Awards and highlights
- Second-team All-American (1957); First-team All-Eastern (1957)

Career NFL/AFL statistics
- Sacks: 1
- Stats at Pro Football Reference

Charles William Brueckman (November 23, 1935 – July 20, 2026) was an American professional football player who was a linebacker in the National Football League (NFL) with the Washington Redskins and in the American Football League (AFL) with the Los Angeles Chargers. He played college football for the Pittsburgh Panthers and was selected in the ninth round of the 1957 NFL draft. Brueckman died on July 20, 2026, at the age of 90.

== See also ==
- List of American Football League players
