= Jim McCusker (American football) =

American football player (1936–2015)

No. 70, 75
- Positions: Defensive tackle, offensive tackle

Personal information
- Born: May 19, 1936; Jamestown, New York, U.S.
- Died: February 13, 2015 (aged 78); Jamestown, New York, U.S.
- Listed height: 6 ft 2 in (1.88 m)
- Listed weight: 246 lb (112 kg)

Career information
- High school: Jamestown
- College: Pittsburgh
- NFL draft: 1958: 2nd round, 14th overall pick

Career history
- Chicago Cardinals (1958); Philadelphia Eagles (1959–1962); Cleveland Browns (1963); New York Jets (1964)

Awards and highlights
- NFL champion (1960); Second-team All-American (1957); First-team All-Eastern (1957)

Career NFL/AFL statistics
- Games played: 83
- Games started: 55
- Fumble recoveries: 4
- Stats at Pro Football Reference

James Brian McCusker (May 19, 1936 – February 13, 2015) was an American professional football player who was a defensive tackle in the National Football League (NFL) and the American Football League (AFL). He played college football for the Pittsburgh Panther. He played professionally for the NFL's Chicago Cardinals (1958), Philadelphia Eagles (1959–1962), and Cleveland Browns (1963) and the AFL's New York Jets (1964). After his retirement, he owned a restaurant and bar called "The Pub" in his hometown of Jamestown, New York with his wife, Mary.
