= 1957 TCU Horned Frogs football team =

American college football season

1957 TCU Horned Frogs football
- Conference: Southwest Conference
- Record: 5–4–1 (2–4 SWC)
- Head coach: Abe Martin (5th season)
- Offensive scheme: Meyer spread
- Home stadium: Amon G. Carter Stadium

1957 Southwest Conference football standings
	Conf.					Overall
Team	W		L		T	W		L		T
No. 8 Rice $	5	–	1	–	0	7	–	4	–	0
No. 11 Texas	4	–	1	–	1	6	–	4	–	1
No. 9 Texas A&M	4	–	2	–	0	8	–	3	–	0
SMU	3	–	3	–	0	4	–	5	–	1
Arkansas	2	–	4	–	0	6	–	4	–	0
TCU	2	–	4	–	0	5	–	4	–	1
Baylor	0	–	5	–	1	3	–	6	–	1
$ – Conference champion; Rankings from AP Poll

The 1957 TCU Horned Frogs football team represented Texas Christian University (TCU) in the 1957 college football season. The Horned Frogs finished the season 5–4–1 overall and 2–4 in the Southwest Conference. The team was coached by Abe Martin in his fifth year as head coach. The Frogs played their home games in Amon G. Carter Stadium, which is located on campus in Fort Worth, Texas.

== Schedule ==
Date	Opponent	Rank	Site	Result	Attendance	Source
September 21	Kansas*		Amon G. Carter Stadium; Fort Worth, TX	T 13–13	15,000	
September 28	at Ohio State*		Ohio Stadium; Columbus, OH	W 18–14	81,784	
October 5	at Arkansas	No. 18	War Memorial Stadium; Little Rock, AR	L 7–20	37,000	
October 12	Alabama*		Amon G. Carter Stadium; Fort Worth, TX	W 28–0	20,000	
October 19	No. 3 Texas A&M		Amon G. Carter Stadium; Fort Worth, TX (rivalry)	L 0–7	46,000	
October 26	at Marquette*		Milwaukee County Stadium; Milwaukee, WI	W 26–7	10,925–10,945	
November 2	at Baylor		Baylor Stadium; Waco, TX (rivalry)	W 19–6	30,000	
November 16	at Texas	No. 17	Memorial Stadium; Austin, TX (rivalry)	L 2–14	30,000	
November 23	No. 13 Rice		Amon G. Carter Stadium; Fort Worth, TX	L 0–20	20,000	
November 30	SMU		Amon G. Carter Stadium; Fort Worth, TX (rivalry)	W 21–0	25,000	
*Non-conference game; Rankings from AP Poll released prior to the game
