= Al Ecuyer =

American gridiron football player (1937–2012)

Profile
- Positions: Guard, Linebacker

Personal information
- Born: October 15, 1937; New Orleans, Louisiana, U.S.
- Died: April 28, 2012 (aged 74); New Orleans, Louisiana, U.S.
- Listed height: 5 ft 10 in (1.78 m)
- Listed weight: 210 lb (95 kg)

Career information
- College: Notre Dame
- NFL draft: 1959: 18th round, 214th overall pick

Career history
- 1959–1965: Edmonton Eskimos
- 1966: Toronto Argonauts
- 1967: Montreal Alouettes

Awards and highlights
- CFL West All-Star (1959); Consensus All-American (1957); First-team All-American (1958)

Allen Joseph Ecuyer (October 15, 1937 – April 28, 2012) was an American football player.

Ecuyer was born in New Orleans in 1937 and attended Jesuit High School in that city.

He played college football at the guard position for the Notre Dame Fighting Irish from 1956–1958. He was a starter all three years. He was a consensus first team All-American in 1957. He was also selected by his teammates as a co-captain of the 1958 Notre Dame Fighting Irish football team.

Ecuyer played in the Canadian Football League (CFL) at guard and linebacker for the Edmonton Eskimos from 1959 to 1965, the Toronto Argonauts in 1966, and the Montreal Alouettes in 1967 and 1968. He appeared in 141 CFL games. He was a Western Conference All-Star at linebacker in his rookie season. He intercepted 13 passes for 161 yards in his career.

After his football career, he became a vice-president of investments with Prudential Securities.

Ecuyer died in 2012 in New Orleans.
