= Dick Lasse =

American football player and coach (1935–2025)

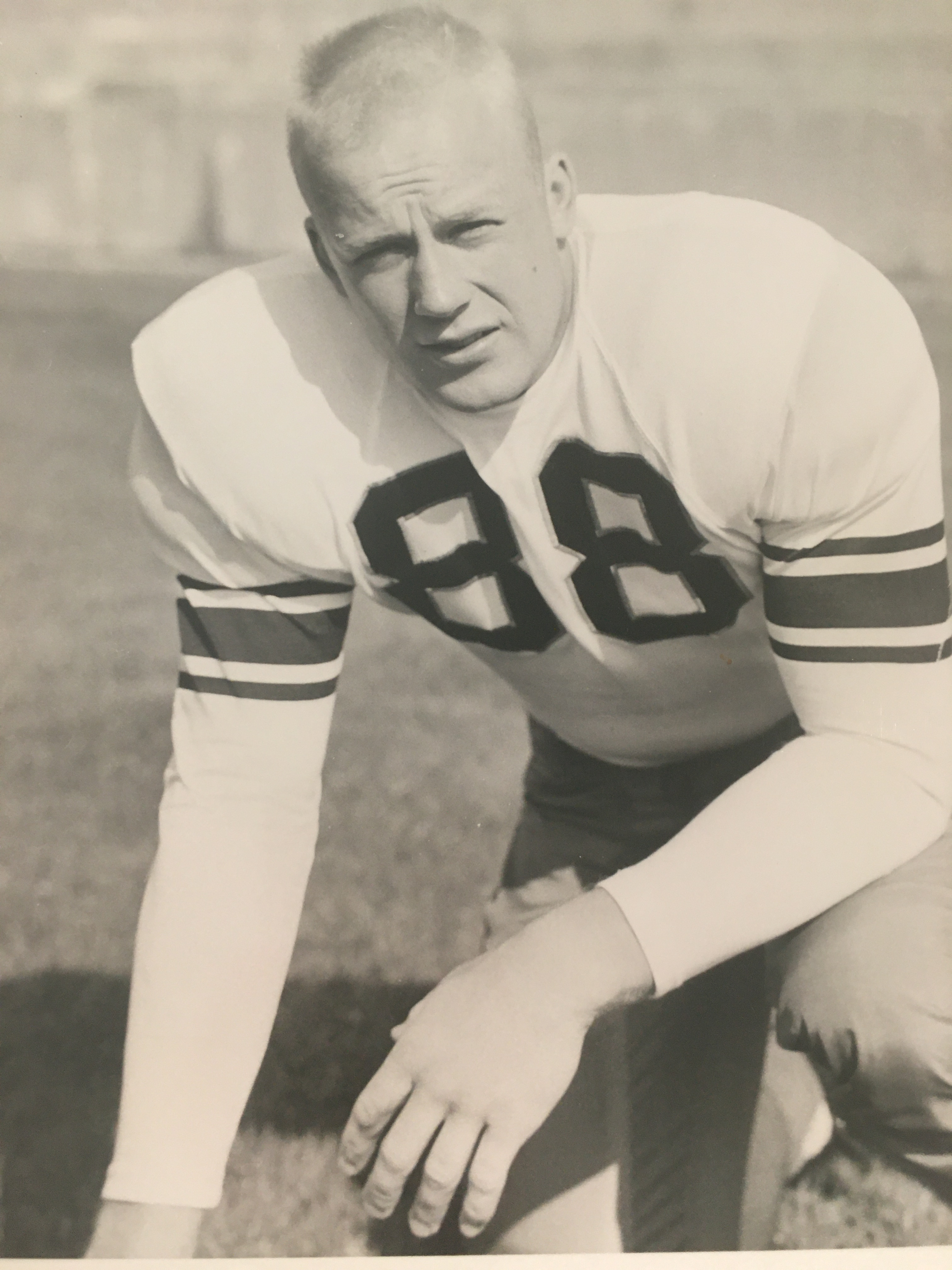
- Lasse in 1958

No. 89, 88, 30
- Position: Linebacker

Personal information
- Born: November 13, 1935; Quincy, Massachusetts, U.S.
- Died: April 28, 2025 (aged 89); New Brighton, Pennsylvania, U.S.
- Listed height: 6 ft 2 in (1.88 m)
- Listed weight: 222 lb (101 kg)

Career information
- High school: Weymouth (Weymouth, Massachusetts); Worcester Academy (Worcester, Massachusetts)
- College: Syracuse
- NFL draft: 1958: 6th round, 68th overall pick

Career history
- Pittsburgh Steelers (1958–1959); Washington Redskins (1960–1961); New York Giants (1962); Hamilton Tiger-Cats (1963)

Awards and highlights
- Second-team All-American (1957); 2× First-team All-Eastern (1956, 1957)

Career NFL statistics
- Interceptions: 3
- Fumble recoveries: 1
- Stats at Pro Football Reference

Richard Stephen Lasse (November 13, 1935 – April 28, 2025) was an American professional football player and college coach.

== College playing career ==
After graduating from Worcester Academy in 1954, Lasse played college football (linebacker and tight end) and wrestled for the Syracuse University, where he was teammates with Jim Brown. His senior year, Lasse was an All-American on defense, while leading the team in receiving. For his efforts he won the Bill Horr Award as the team's MVP and the Pat Miller Award as the team's outstanding athlete, student, and citizen. He was chosen to play in the 1958 Senior Bowl and North-South Game.

== Professional playing career ==
Lasse was drafted in the sixth round (68th overall) in the 1958 NFL Draft by the Pittsburgh Steelers. He played five seasons with the team, followed by a season each with the Washington Redskins and the New York Giants. In 1963 he played a season in the CFL for the Hamilton Tiger-Cats.

== Coaching career ==
=== Curry ===
Lasse was the first football coach at Curry College in Milton, Massachusetts, starting the program in 1965 with an inaugural winless season of 0–5. He coached at Curry until 1968, accumulating a record of 3–19.

=== Geneva ===
Lasse was the 27th head football coach at Geneva College located in Beaver Falls, Pennsylvania and holding the position for two seasons 1974 and 1975. His coaching record at Geneva was 1–17.

== Death ==
Lasse died on April 28, 2025, at the age of 89.
