= Nick Mumley =

American football player (1937–2022)

No. 74
- Positions: Offensive tackle, defensive end

Personal information
- Born: January 26, 1937; Wheeling, West Virginia, U.S.
- Died: September 22, 2022 (aged 85); Fort Wayne, Indiana, U.S.
- Listed height: 6 ft 6 in (1.98 m)
- Listed weight: 250 lb (113 kg)

Career information
- High school: Wheeling
- College: Purdue (1955–1958)
- NFL draft: 1959: 5th round, 51st overall pick

Career history
- Philadelphia Eagles (1959)*; Dallas Texans (1960)*; New York Titans (1960-1962); Denver Broncos (1963)*
- * Offseason or practice squad member only

Awards and highlights
- Second-team All-American (1957); Second-team All-Big Ten (1957)

Career AFL statistics
- Interceptions: 1
- Touchdowns: 1
- Sacks: 2.5
- Stats at Pro Football Reference

Nicholas Mumley, Jr. (January 26, 1937 – September 22, 2022) was an American professional football player who was a tackle for the New York Titans of the American Football League (AFL).

Mumley was born in Wheeling, West Virginia, and attended Wheeling High School.

He then enrolled at Purdue University where he played college football at the tackle position for the Purdue Boilermakers football team from 1956 to 1957 and 1959. He was selected by the International News Service as a second-team player on its 1957 College Football All-America Team.

Mumley was selected by the Philadelphia Eagles in the fifth round (51st overall pick) of the 1959 NFL draft. He opted instead to play for the New York Titans (later renamed the Jets) in the new AFL. He appeared in 42 games, 36 as a starter, as a defensive end from 1960 to 1962.

Mumley died on September 22, 2022, at the age of 85.
