= Bob Anderson (American football) =

American football player (born 1938)

No. 41
- Position: Halfback

Personal information
- Born: March 31, 1938 (age 88); Elizabeth, New Jersey, U.S.
- Listed height: 6 ft 2 in (1.88 m)
- Listed weight: 215 lb (98 kg)

Career information
- High school: Cocoa (Cocoa, Florida)
- College: Army
- NFL draft: 1960: 9th round, 108th overall pick

Career history
- New York Giants (1963)

Awards and highlights
- Consensus All-American (1957); First-team All-American (1958); 2× First-team All-Eastern (1957, 1958)
- Stats at Pro Football Reference
- College Football Hall of Fame

Robert Paul Anderson (born March 31, 1938) is an American former professional football player who was a halfback in the National Football League (NFL) for the New York Giants. He played college football at the United States Military Academy where he was a two-time first-team All-America selection, rushing for 1,887 yards and 21 touchdowns. He was selected in the ninth round of the 1960 NFL draft. He first served three years as a lieutenant in the 101st Airborne Division. After returning from service and joining the Giants, Anderson suffered a career ending knee injury.
