= Steve Eisenhauer =

American football player (1931–2016)

No. 66
- Position: Tackle / Guard

Personal information
- Born: December 1, 1931; Sheffield, Pennsylvania, U.S.
- Died: May 1, 2016 (aged 84); Winchester, Virginia, U.S.
- Listed height: 5 ft 11 in (1.80 m)
- Listed weight: 201 lb (91 kg)

Career information
- College: Navy

Career history
- 1951–1953: Navy Midshipmen

Awards and highlights
- 2× First-team All-American (1952, 1953)
- College Football Hall of Fame

Steve Eisenhauer (December 1, 1931 – May 1, 2016) was an American former football player. He was elected to the College Football Hall of Fame in 1994.
