= Wayne Hardin =

American football player and coach (1926–2017)

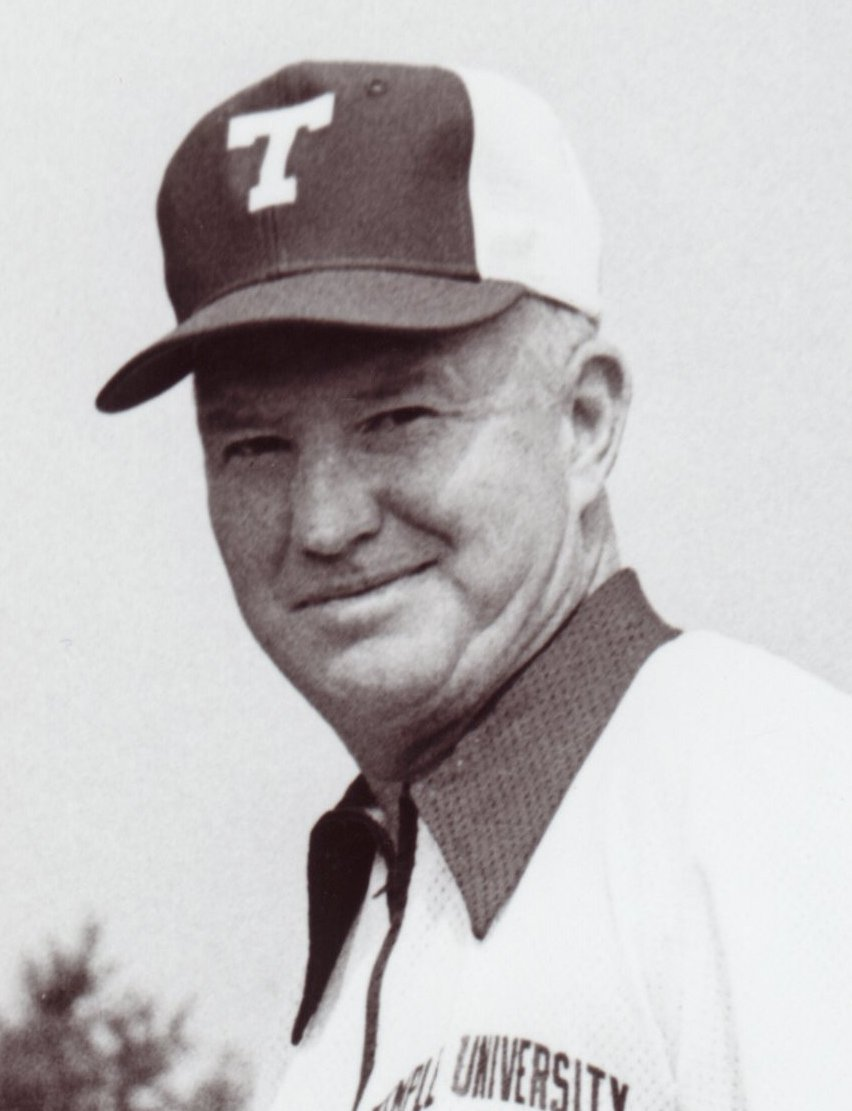

Biographical details
- Born: March 23, 1926; Smackover, Arkansas, U.S.
- Died: April 12, 2017 (aged 91); Oreland, Pennsylvania, U.S.
- Education: College of the Pacific

Playing career
- 1946–1948: Pacific (CA)
- Positions: Halfback, quarterback

Coaching career (HC unless noted)
- 1949: Pacific (CA) (SA)
- 1950–1951: Ceres HS (CA)
- 1952: Pacific (CA) (backfield)
- 1953–1954: Porterville
- 1955–1958: Navy (assistant)
- 1959–1964: Navy
- 1966: Philadelphia Bulldogs
- 1970–1982: Temple

Head coaching record
- Overall: 118–74–5 (college); 9–8 (junior college)
- Bowls: 1–2
- College Football Hall of Fame; Inducted in 2013 (profile)

Irving Wayne Hardin (March 23, 1926 – April 12, 2017) was an American football player and coach. He served as the head football coach at the United States Naval Academy from 1959 to 1964 and at Temple University from 1970 to 1982, compiling a career college football record of 118–74–5. Hardin led Navy to appearances in the 1961 Orange Bowl and the 1964 Cotton Bowl Classic, and coached two Midshipmen to the Heisman Trophy, Joe Bellino in 1960 and Roger Staubach in 1963.

After leaving Navy, Hardin coached the Philadelphia Bulldogs of the Continental Football League, leading the team to a championship in 1966. Hardin was inducted into the College Football Hall of Fame as a coach in 2013.

== Early life and playing career ==
Irving Wayne Hardin was born in Smackover, Arkansas, and attended high school in Stockton, California and Ceres, California at Ceres High School. He played college football at the College of the Pacific under Hall of Fame coach Amos Alonzo Stagg and his successor, Larry Siemering. Hardin won 11 varsity letters at Pacific before he graduated in 1950. He was inducted into the College of the Pacific's Athletics Hall of Fame in 1998. Hardin was also a veteran of WWII. After his freshman year at Pacific he enlisted and served in the U.S. Coast Guard and served on the ship the USS Orlando PF-99.

== Coaching career ==
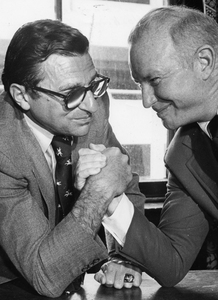
Hardin with Penn State's Joe Paterno

After serving as a student assistant coach in 1949 at Pacific, Hardin began his professional coaching career in 1950 at Ceres High School in Ceres, California. There he coached football and basketball. Hardin returned to his alma mater, Pacific, in 1952 as the backfield coach under Ernie Jorge. He then moved on to Porterville College, a community college in Porterville, California, where in two seasons as head football coach, 1953 and 1954, he tallied a mark of 9–8. In 1955, Hardin was hired as an assistant football coach at the United States Naval Academy under Eddie Erdelatz.

From 1959 to 1964, Hardin was the head coach at Navy, where he compiled a 38–22–2 record. His Navy teams posted five consecutive wins against archrival Army, a feat not surpassed until 2007 when Paul Johnson's Navy squad won their sixth consecutive contest in the Army–Navy Game. Hardin coached Navy's two winners of the Heisman Trophy, Joe Bellino, who received the award in 1960, and Roger Staubach, who did so in 1963. On December 17, 1964, Hardin (who had agreed to a five-year extension the previous February) submitted his resignation from Navy.

Hardin was the head coach at Temple from 1970 to 1982, where he compiled an 80–50–3 record. His 80 wins are the most in school history. Hardin coached numerous future professional players at Temple including New York Jets defensive lineman Joe Klecko, Pittsburgh Steelers tight end Randy Grossman, Kansas City Chiefs cornerback Kevin Ross, San Diego Chargers linebacker Bill Singletary, and New York Jets quarterback Steve Joachim, who won the Maxwell Award in 1974 playing for the Owls. Under Hardin, Temple's school-record 14-game winning streak over two seasons from 1973 into 1974 was the longest Division I winning streak at the time.

Hardin's 1979 squad was the most successful in Temple football's history. The team went 10–2 and finished the season ranked #17 in both major polls, the only Temple team to finish a campaign ranked. The 1979 team concluded their season with a victory in the 1979 Garden State Bowl over heavily favored Cal. Temple did not return to a bowl game until the 2009 season.

Hardin's career college record was 118–74–5.

== After coaching ==
Hardin also spent time as a color commentator for CBS Sports for the Baltimore Colts. Hardin died at the age of 91 on April 12, 2017, after suffering a massive stroke in Oreland, Pennsylvania.

== Head coaching record ==
=== College ===
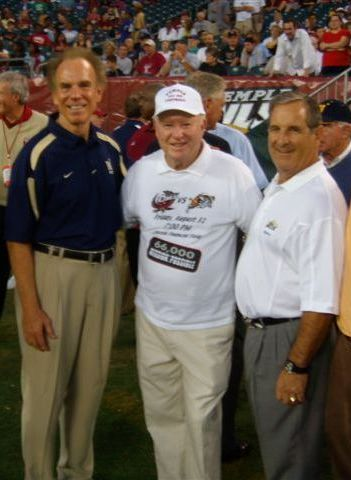
Hardin in 2007 with Navy's two Heisman Trophy winners, Roger Staubach and Joe Bellino

| Year | Team | Overall | Conference | Standing | Bowl/playoffs | Coaches^{#} | AP^{°} |
|---|---|---|---|---|---|---|---|
Navy Midshipmen (NCAA University Division independent) (1959–1964)
| 1959 | Navy | 5–4–1 | | | | | |
| 1960 | Navy | 9–2 | | | L Orange | 6 | 4 |
| 1961 | Navy | 7–3 | | | | | |
| 1962 | Navy | 5–5 | | | | | |
| 1963 | Navy | 9–2 | | | L Cotton | 2 | 2 |
| 1964 | Navy | 3–6–1 | | | | | |
| Navy: | | 38–22–2 | | | | | |
Temple Owls (NCAA College Division independent) (1970)
| 1970 | Temple | 7–3 | | | | | |
Temple Owls (NCAA University Division / Division I / Division I-A independent) (1971–1982)
| 1971 | Temple | 6–2–1 | | | | | |
| 1972 | Temple | 5–4 | | | | | |
| 1973 | Temple | 9–1 | | | | | |
| 1974 | Temple | 8–2 | | | | | |
| 1975 | Temple | 6–5 | | | | | |
| 1976 | Temple | 4–6 | | | | | |
| 1977 | Temple | 5–5–1 | | | | | |
| 1978 | Temple | 7–3–1 | | | | | |
| 1979 | Temple | 10–2 | | | W Garden State | 17 | 17 |
| 1980 | Temple | 4–7 | | | | | |
| 1981 | Temple | 5–5 | | | | | |
| 1982 | Temple | 4–7 | | | | | |
| Temple: | | 80–50–3 | | | | | |
| Total: | | 118–74–5 | | | | | |
^{#}Rankings from final Coaches Poll.; ^{°}Rankings from final AP Poll.
