= 1957 Texas A&M Aggies football team =

American college football season

1957 Texas A&M Aggies football

Gator Bowl, L 0–3 vs. Tennessee
- Conference: Southwest Conference

Ranking
- Coaches: No. 9
- AP: No. 10
- Record: 8–3 (4–2 SWC)
- Head coach: Bear Bryant (4th season)
- Home stadium: Kyle Field

1957 Southwest Conference football standings
	Conf.					Overall
Team	W		L		T	W		L		T
No. 8 Rice $	5	–	1	–	0	7	–	4	–	0
No. 11 Texas	4	–	1	–	1	6	–	4	–	1
No. 9 Texas A&M	4	–	2	–	0	8	–	3	–	0
SMU	3	–	3	–	0	4	–	5	–	1
Arkansas	2	–	4	–	0	6	–	4	–	0
TCU	2	–	4	–	0	5	–	4	–	1
Baylor	0	–	5	–	1	3	–	6	–	1
$ – Conference champion; Rankings from AP Poll

The 1957 Texas A&M Aggies football team represented Texas A&M University in the 1957 college football season. The Aggies offense scored 158 points while the defense allowed 50 points. Led by head coach Bear Bryant, the Aggies competed in the Gator Bowl. Bryant notably departed for Alabama the following season.

== Schedule ==
Date	Opponent	Rank	Site	TV	Result	Attendance	Source
September 21	vs. Maryland*	No. 2	Cotton Bowl; Dallas, TX	NBC	W 21–13	25,000	
September 28	at Texas Tech*	No. 2	Jones Stadium; Lubbock, TX (rivalry)		W 21–0	27,000	
October 5	at Missouri*	No. 5	Memorial Stadium; Columbia, MO		W 28–0	26,250	
October 12	Houston*	No. 3	Kyle Field; College Station, TX		W 28–6	33,000	
October 19	at TCU	No. 3	Amon G. Carter Stadium; Fort Worth, TX (rivalry)		W 7–0	46,000	
October 26	Baylor	No. 2	Kyle Field; College Station, TX (rivalry)		W 14–0	42,000	
November 2	at No. 11 Arkansas	No. 1	Razorback Stadium; Fayetteville, AR (rivalry)		W 7–6	31,000	
November 9	SMU	No. 1	Kyle Field; College Station, TX		W 19–6	28,000	
November 16	at No. 20 Rice	No. 1	Rice Stadium; Houston, TX		L 6–7	72,000	
November 28	Texas	No. 4	Kyle Field; College Station, TX (rivalry)		L 7–9	42,000	
December 27	vs. No. 13 Tennessee*	No. 8	Gator Bowl; Jacksonville, FL (Gator Bowl)	CBS	L 0–3	43,709	
*Non-conference game; Rankings from AP Poll released prior to the game

== Roster ==
- QB Charlie Milstead, So.

== Team players drafted into the NFL ==
Player	Position	Round	Pick	NFL club
John David Crow	Halfback	1	2	Chicago Cardinals
Charlie Krueger	Tackle	1	9	San Francisco 49ers
Bobby Joe Conrad	Back	5	58	New York Giants
Bobby Marks	Back	8	91	Los Angeles Rams
Ken Hall	Back	14	165	Baltimore Colts
Roddy Osborne	Back	17	204	Cleveland Browns

== Awards and honors ==
- John David Crow, Heisman Trophy
