= 1957 Arkansas Razorbacks football team =

American college football season

1957 Arkansas Razorbacks football
- Conference: Southwest Conference
- Record: 6–4 (2–4 SWC)
- Head coach: Jack Mitchell (3rd season)
- Captains: Jay Donathan; Gerald Nesbitt; George Walker
- Home stadium: Razorback Stadium; War Memorial Stadium

1957 Southwest Conference football standings
	Conf.					Overall
Team	W		L		T	W		L		T
No. 8 Rice $	5	–	1	–	0	7	–	4	–	0
No. 11 Texas	4	–	1	–	1	6	–	4	–	1
No. 9 Texas A&M	4	–	2	–	0	8	–	3	–	0
SMU	3	–	3	–	0	4	–	5	–	1
Arkansas	2	–	4	–	0	6	–	4	–	0
TCU	2	–	4	–	0	5	–	4	–	1
Baylor	0	–	5	–	1	3	–	6	–	1
$ – Conference champion; Rankings from AP Poll

The 1957 Arkansas Razorbacks football team represented the University of Arkansas in the Southwest Conference (SWC) during the 1957 college football season. In their third year under head coach Jack Mitchell, the Razorbacks compiled a 6–4 record (2–4 against SWC opponents), finished in a tie for fifth place in the SWC, and outscored all opponents by a combined total of 187 to 134.

Razorback punter/fullback and co-captain Gerald Nesbitt was fourth in the nation in yards per punt, with 42.0.

== Schedule ==
Date	Opponent	Rank	Site	Result	Attendance	Source
September 21	Oklahoma State*		War Memorial Stadium; Little Rock, AR	W 12–0	24,000	
September 28	Tulsa*		Razorback Stadium; Fayetteville, AR	W 41–14	20,000	
October 5	No. 17 TCU		War Memorial Stadium; Fayetteville, AR	W 20–7	37,000	
October 12	at Baylor	No. 11	Baylor Stadium; Waco, TX	W 20–17	29,000	
October 19	Texas	No. 10	Razorback Stadium; Fayetteville, AR (rivalry)	L 0–17	27,000	
October 26	vs. No. 6 Ole Miss*		Crump Stadium; Memphis, TN (rivalry)	W 12–6	30,601	
November 2	No. 1 Texas A&M	No. 11	Razorback Stadium; Fayetteville, AR (rivalry)	L 6–7	31,000	
November 9	at Rice	No. 12	Rice Stadium; Houston, TX	L 7–13	40,000	
November 16	at SMU		Cotton Bowl; Dallas, TX	L 22–27	25,500	
November 23	Texas Tech*		War Memorial Stadium; Little Rock, AR (rivalry)	W 47–26	19,000	
*Non-conference game; Rankings from AP Poll released prior to the game
