= Les Walters =

American football player (born 1937)

No. 27
- Positions: End, defensive back

Personal information
- Born: February 13, 1937 (age 89); Palmyra, Pennsylvania, U.S.
- Listed height: 6 ft 0 in (1.83 m)
- Listed weight: 185 lb (84 kg)

Career information
- High school: Milton Hershey School (Hershey, Pennsylvania)
- College: Penn State
- NFL draft: 1958: 4th round, 48th overall pick

Career history
- Baltimore Colts (1958)*; Washington Redskins (1958)
- * Offseason or practice squad member only

Awards and highlights
- Second-team All-American (1957); First-team All-Eastern (1957)

Career NFL statistics
- Interceptions: 1
- Stats at Pro Football Reference

Lester Kenneth Walters Jr. (born February 13, 1937) is an American former professional football player for the Washington Redskins of the National Football League (NFL). He played college football for the Penn State Nittany Lions.

Walters was born in 1937 at Palmyra, Pennsylvania. He attended Milton Hershey School in Hershey, Pennsylvania.

Walters attended Pennsylvania State University, where he played football at the end position for the from 1955 to 1957. As a senior in 1957, he caught 24 passes for 426 yards and five touchdowns. He was selected by the Associated Press (AP) as a second-team player on its 1957 College Football All-America Team. He was also selected by both the AP and the United Press as a first-team player on the 1957 All-Eastern college football team. He also competed for the Penn State wrestling team.

Walters was selected by the Baltimore Colts in the fourth round (48th overall pick) of the 1958 NFL draft. He signed with the Colts in February 1958, but he was the last player cut by the Colts before the start of the 1958 season, but was then picked up by the Washington Redskins. He appeared in eight games as a defensive back for the Redskins during the 1958 NFL season. He recorded one interception which he returned for 19 yards.
