= Joseph G. Sabol =

American football player and coach (1936–1998)

Biographical details
- Born: November 7, 1936; Shamokin, Pennsylvania, U.S.
- Died: December 25, 1998 (aged 62); Northfield, Vermont, U.S.

Playing career
- 1955–1957: Penn State

Coaching career (HC unless noted)
- 1965–1974: Norwich
- 1975–1977: Gettysburg

Head coaching record
- Overall: 57–53–1

Accomplishments and honors

Awards
- Second-team All-Eastern (1957)

Joseph George Sabol (November 7, 1936 – December 25, 1998) was an American football player and coach. He was a three-time letter winner at Penn State. He served as the head football coach at Norwich University in Northfield, Vermont from 1964 to 1975 and at Gettysburg College in Gettysburg, Pennsylvania from 1975 to 1978, compiling a career college football coaching record of 57–53–1. After Gettysburg College, he returned to Norwich University as athletic director and completed his career in the early 1990s.
