= 1957 Baylor Bears football team =

American college football season

1957 Baylor Bears football
- Conference: Southwest Conference
- Record: 3–6–1 (0–5–1 SWC)
- Head coach: Sam Boyd (2nd season)
- Captains: Doyle Traylor; Jerry Marcontell
- Home stadium: Baylor Stadium

1957 Southwest Conference football standings
	Conf.					Overall
Team	W		L		T	W		L		T
No. 8 Rice $	5	–	1	–	0	7	–	4	–	0
No. 11 Texas	4	–	1	–	1	6	–	4	–	1
No. 9 Texas A&M	4	–	2	–	0	8	–	3	–	0
SMU	3	–	3	–	0	4	–	5	–	1
Arkansas	2	–	4	–	0	6	–	4	–	0
TCU	2	–	4	–	0	5	–	4	–	1
Baylor	0	–	5	–	1	3	–	6	–	1
$ – Conference champion; Rankings from AP Poll

The 1957 Baylor Bears football team represented Baylor University as a member of the Southwest Conference (SWC) during the 1957 college football season. Led by second-year head coach Sam Boyd, the Bears compiled an overall record of 3–6–1 with a mark of 0–5–1 in conference play, placing last out of seven teams in the SWC. Baylor played home games at Baylor Stadium in Waco, Texas.

Guard Clyde Letbetter was selected to the All-Southwest Conference team.

== Schedule ==
Date	Opponent	Rank	Site	Result	Attendance	Source
September 21	Villanova*	No. 7	Baylor Stadium; Waco, TX	W 7–0	20,000	
September 28	No. 14 Houston*	No. 11	Baylor Stadium; Waco, TX (rivalry)	W 14–6	22,000	
October 5	at Miami (FL)*	No. 11	Burdine Stadium; Miami, FL	L 7–13	41,160	
October 12	No. 11 Arkansas		Baylor Stadium; Waco, TX	L 17–20	29,000	
October 19	at Texas Tech*		Jones Stadium; Lubbock, TX (rivalry)	W 15–12	23,000	
October 26	at No. 2 Texas A&M		Kyle Field; College Station, TX (rivalry)	L 0–14	42,000	
November 2	TCU^{†}		Baylor Stadium; Waco, TX (rivalry)	L 6–19	30,000	
November 9	at Texas		Memorial Stadium; Austin, TX (rivalry)	T 7–7	37,000–43,000	
November 23	SMU		Baylor Stadium; Waco, TX	L 7–14	15,000	
November 30	at No. 9 Rice		Rice Stadium; Houston, TX	L 0–20	43,000	
*Non-conference game; ^{†}Homecoming; Rankings from AP Poll released prior to the game
