= 1957 Texas Longhorns football team =

American college football season

1957 Texas Longhorns football

Sugar Bowl, L 7–39 vs. Ole Miss
- Conference: Southwest Conference

Ranking
- Coaches: No. 11
- AP: No. 11
- Record: 6–4–1 (4–1–1 SWC)
- Head coach: Darrell Royal (1st season)
- Offensive scheme: Split-T
- Base defense: 5–2 Oklahoma
- Captains: Walter Fondren; Louis Del Homme
- Home stadium: Memorial Stadium

1957 Southwest Conference football standings
	Conf.					Overall
Team	W		L		T	W		L		T
No. 8 Rice $	5	–	1	–	0	7	–	4	–	0
No. 11 Texas	4	–	1	–	1	6	–	4	–	1
No. 9 Texas A&M	4	–	2	–	0	8	–	3	–	0
SMU	3	–	3	–	0	4	–	5	–	1
Arkansas	2	–	4	–	0	6	–	4	–	0
TCU	2	–	4	–	0	5	–	4	–	1
Baylor	0	–	5	–	1	3	–	6	–	1
$ – Conference champion; Rankings from AP Poll

The 1957 Texas Longhorns football team represented the University of Texas (now known as the University of Texas at Austin) during the 1957 college football season as a member of the Southwest Conference (SWC). In their first season under head coach Darrell Royal, the team compiled an overall 6–4–1 record (4–1–1 in conference), finishing second among the SWC's seven teams. The Longhorns outscored their opponents by a total of 152 to 110 and notably upset #4 Texas A&M and Heisman winner John David Crow, at Kyle Field. The season concluded with a 7–39 loss to Ole Miss in the 1958 Sugar Bowl. Texas finished ranked #11 in both the final AP and Coaches Polls.

Royal was hired to replace Ed Price after the Longhorns finished 1-9 in 1956. He’d eventually win three national championships and 167 games with the school from 1957 to 1976, and be inducted into the College Football Hall of Fame. Quarterback Walter Fondren led the team in passing and total offense, completing 33 of 49 passes for 428 yards and 5 touchdowns with four interceptions. The team ranked 59th nationally in scoring offense (15.2 points per game) and 30th in scoring defense (11.0 points per game).

Until the 1995 team, this remained the final season that the Longhorns played at least three games outside the state of Texas.

== Offseason ==
Midway through the 1956 season after a loss to Rice and two hung effigies during an abysmal 1–9 season, Longhorns head coach Ed Price announced his resignation on October 31, to be effective January 1, 1957. Price and his predecessor Blair Cherry had chafed under criticism from alumni and boosters for years following losses to rival Oklahoma and a perceived failure in "the big games". Price specifically was viewed as having a "soft-nosed" approach to the game and disappointing recruiting classes from 1953 to 1955. After his resignation Price moved to the university's physical education department as a teacher.

The day after Price's resignation former Notre Dame coach Frank Leahy, then in Hollywood, announced he had been approached by prominent UT alumni about becoming the athletic director at Texas and appointing former assistant Bob McBride as head coach. His effort, according to Lou Maysel in Here come the Texas Longhorns, "had the backing of at least one member of the Board of Regents, but the thought of having such a gadfly as Leahy directing athletics horrified most UT officials." Despite Leahy's public campaign, behind the scenes athletic director Dana X. Bible was in charge of creating the lists of 115 candidates. Of the two lists created the first consisted of men capable of taking over as head coach, and the other of those who could simultaneously take over the AD position from Bible, who was nearing the end of his contract. Darrell Royal's name was on neither list. By Thanksgiving Leahy was no longer being considered and Georgia Tech head coach Bobby Dodd had publicly declined the job. Upon following up with Dodd and Michigan State's Duffy Daugherty about potential rising candidates, both separately recommended Royal.

Royal was 32 in 1956 and a former star quarterback at OU from 1946 to 1949, since then he had various brief coaching stints around the country and in the CFL, by the time of the coaching search he was head coach at Washington. Recalling the moment he got the call years later Royal said "I had told Edith about how great it would be to coach at Texas...One night we were in bed and I got a phone call. I picked the phone up, and the voice on the other end said, 'Darrell, this is D. X. Bible from the University of Texas.' D. X. was the athletic director and former head coach. And I remember covering up the phone, and I said, 'Edith, this is it.' So they invited me to come for a visit." The interview with the Athletic Council was set for December 18 and Royal asked for each members name so he could address them personally. He walked out of the meeting with a unanimous recommendation. Then, after selling himself to the UT administration and Board of Regents, and after only 4 hours in Austin, Royal had the job. He was given a five-year contract at $17,500 annually.

== Schedule ==
Date	Opponent	Rank	Site	Result	Attendance	Source
September 21	at Georgia*		Grant Field; Atlanta, GA	W 26–7	26,965	
September 28	Tulane*	No. 13	Memorial Stadium; Austin, TX	W 20–6	31,778	
October 5	South Carolina*	No. 20	Memorial Stadium; Austin, TX	L 21–27	41,060	
October 12	vs. No. 1 Oklahoma*		Cotton Bowl; Dallas, TX (rivalry)	L 7–21	75,481	
October 19	at No. 10 Arkansas		Razorback Stadium; Fayetteville, AR (rivalry)	W 17–0	23,153	
October 26	No. 13 Rice	No. 19	Memorial Stadium; Austin, TX (rivalry)	W 19–14	46,354	
November 2	at SMU	No. 13	Cotton Bowl; Dallas, TX	L 12–19	43,032	
November 9	Baylor		Memorial Stadium; Austin, TX (rivalry)	T 7–7	38,692	
November 16	No. 17 TCU		Memorial Stadium; Austin, TX (rivalry)	W 14–2	28,782	
November 28	at No. 4 Texas A&M		Kyle Field; College Station, TX (rivalry)	W 9–7	42,094	
January 1, 1958	vs. No. 7 Ole Miss*	No. 11	Tulane Stadium; New Orleans, LA (Sugar Bowl)	L 7–39	78,937	
*Non-conference game; Rankings from AP Poll released prior to the game

== Rankings ==
Ranking movements Legend: ██ Increase in ranking ██ Decrease in ranking — = Not ranked
	Week											
Poll	Pre	1	2	3	4	5	6	7	8	9	10	Final
AP	—	13	20	—	—	19	13	—	—	—	—	11
Coaches												11
