= Joe Bellino =

American football player (1938–2019)

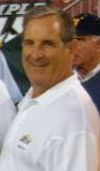
- Bellino in 2007

No. 27
- Position: Halfback

Personal information
- Born: March 13, 1938; Winchester, Massachusetts, U.S.
- Died: March 27, 2019 (aged 81); Lincoln, Massachusetts, U.S.
- Listed height: 5 ft 9 in (1.75 m)
- Listed weight: 185 lb (84 kg)

Career information
- High school: Winchester
- College: Navy (1958–1960)
- NFL draft: 1961: 17th round, 227th overall pick
- AFL draft: 1961: 19th round, 146th overall pick

Career history
- Boston Patriots (1965–1967)

Awards and highlights
- Heisman Trophy (1960); Maxwell Award (1960); UPI Player of the Year (1960); SN Player of the Year (1960); Chic Harley Award (1960); Unanimous All-American (1960); First-team All-Eastern (1960); Navy Midshipmen No. 27 retired

Career AFL statistics
- Rushing yards: 64
- Rushing average: 2.1
- Receptions: 11
- Receiving yards: 151
- Receiving touchdowns: 1
- Stats at Pro Football Reference
- College Football Hall of Fame

Joseph Michael Bellino (March 13, 1938 – March 27, 2019) was an American professional football player who was a halfback in the American Football League (AFL) for the Boston Patriots. He played college football for the Navy Midshipmen, where he won the Heisman Trophy in 1960. He was inducted into the College Football Hall of Fame in 1977.

== Early life ==
Bellino was born in Winchester, Massachusetts, attended the town's public schools, and was a three-sport star at Winchester High School. In baseball he batted well over .400 and was courted by major league teams. He was offered a contract by the Pittsburgh Pirates after high school.

The basketball team on which he starred won the state championship his sophomore and junior years. They moved up to the Class A (largest schools) tournament his senior year, where the team's 55-game winning streak came to an end at the hands of much larger B.M.C. Durfee High School of Fall River.

He was a dominant halfback on Winchester's outstanding football team, although his senior season was shortened by the 1955 polio epidemic. He was recruited by several Big Ten schools, Notre Dame, Ivy League schools as well as the U.S. Military Academy, but his first choice all along was Navy.

== College career ==
During his 1956–57 year at Columbian Prep in Washington, D.C., Bellino starred in both football and basketball. On November 25, Bellino scored three touchdowns in Columbian's upset win over the Navy Plebes, 34–33.

In the fall of 1957, Bellino entered the United States Naval Academy in Annapolis, Maryland, along with his former high-school teammate, Frank Dattilo. During his freshman year, the Plebes matched up against the Penn State freshmen. Penn State won the game 23–13, but Bellino took a lateral from his Columbian teammate Harry Dietz and scored on an 85-yard kickoff return.

He was an outstanding baseball player at Navy, but his legendary exploits occurred on the football field. In his senior year, he rushed for 834 yards, caught 15 passes for 264 yards and three touchdowns, threw two touchdown passes, averaged 47.1 yards as a punter, and returned kicks and punts. He won the 1960 Heisman Trophy by a wide margin, garnering the most votes in each of the five national voting regions. In Bellino's final college football game, Navy's loss to the University of Missouri in the 1961 Orange Bowl, he scored his team's final touchdown with a spectacular diving catch in the end zone.

Following graduation, Ensign Bellino began his four years of active Navy service, until he was discharged to reserve duty.

== Professional career ==
Bellino was selected in 17th round of the 1961 NFL draft by the Washington Redskins, as well as in the 19th round of the 1961 AFL draft by the Boston Patriots. He decided to join the Patriots of the American Football League, and played three seasons, primarily as a kick returner. Due to his five-year commitment to the U.S. Navy following graduation, he remains the lowest drafted Heisman Trophy winner in the history of the National Football League (NFL).

Bellino also played for the Providence Steamrollers semi-pro team in Providence, Rhode Island.

Bellino is the only past Heisman Trophy winning running back to have played for the Patriots. He caught a 15-yard pass from past Heisman Trophy winner John Huarte in the Patriots 38–14 rout of the Houston Oilers on December 11, 1966. Bellino caught a deflected pass on his back that allowed the Patriots to continue a drive that resulted in a touchdown in their 14–3 win over the Buffalo Bills in "The Game" at Fenway Park on December 4, 1966.

He had the Patriots longest kickoff return in 1966 and caught a 25-yard TD pass in the Patriots 20–10 win over the Buffalo Bills at War Memorial Stadium on October 8, 1966.

Bellino was selected by the Cincinnati Bengals in the 1968 AFL expansion draft.

== After football ==
Bellino served a total of 28 years in the United States Navy and the Naval Reserve, and retired with the rank of captain.

After the close of his playing career, he was a successful businessman in the Boston area, where he was also active in charitable organizations. He and his wife, Ann Tansey, had two children, Therese and John, and lived in Bedford, Massachusetts.

In 1976 Bellino also coached Saint Columbkille, a small Catholic school. In 1991, he was the first inductee into his high school's Winchester Sports Foundation Hall of Fame. Bellino Park in Winchester was dedicated in his honor in November 2004.

Bellino died on March 27, 2019, at the age of 81. Since the start of the team's 2019 season, Bellino's #27 jersey number is painted upon the field at each 27 yard line of Navy–Marine Corps Memorial Stadium in memoriam.
