= Navy Midshipmen football =

American athletic football program of the US military Naval Academy

2026 Navy Midshipmen football team
- First season: 1879; 147 years ago
- Athletic director: Michael Kelly
- Head coach: Brian Newberry; 3rd season, 25–12 (.676)
- Location: Annapolis, Maryland
- Stadium: Navy–Marine Corps Memorial Stadium (capacity: 38,803)
- NCAA division: Division I FBS
- Conference: American
- Colors: Navy blue and gold
- All-time record: 758–605–57 (.554)
- Bowl record: 14–11–1 (.558)

National championships
- Claimed: 1926

National finalist
- Poll era: 1963

Division championships
- AAC West: 2015, 2016, 2019
- Heisman winners: Joe Bellino – 1960; Roger Staubach – 1963
- Consensus All-Americans: 24
- Rivalries: Army (rivalry); Air Force (rivalry); Johns Hopkins (rivalry; dormant); Notre Dame (rivalry); Maryland (rivalry); SMU (rivalry)

Uniforms
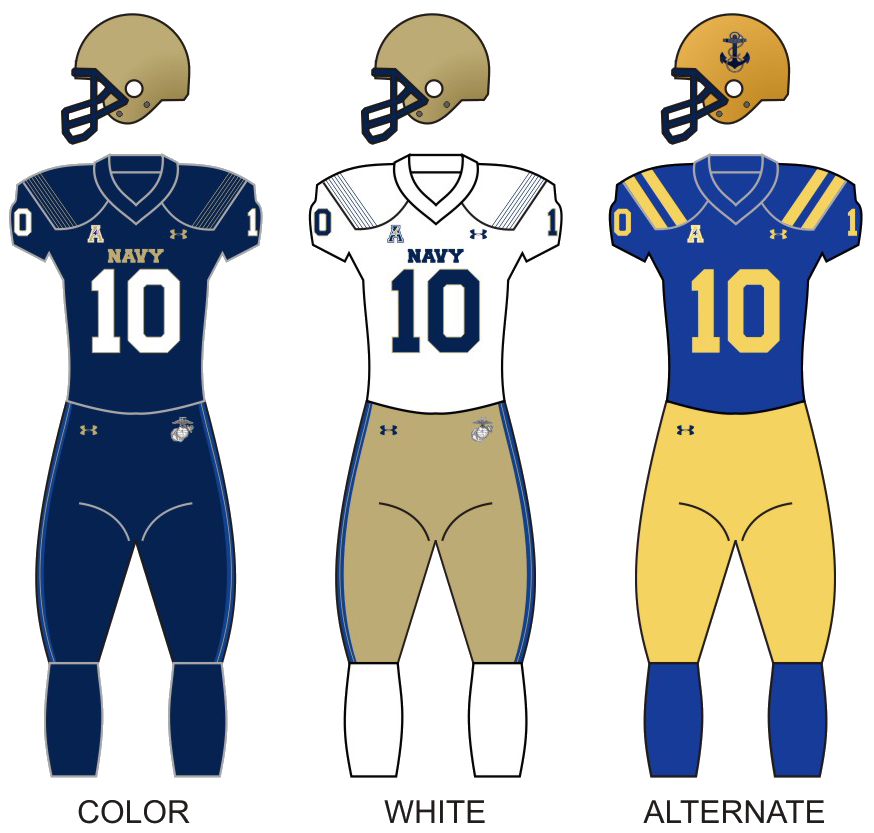
- Fight song: Anchors Aweigh
- Mascot: Bill the Goat
- Marching band: United States Naval Academy Drum and Bugle Corps
- Outfitter: Under Armour
- Website: NavySports.com

The Navy Midshipmen football team represents the United States Naval Academy in NCAA Division I FBS (Football Bowl Subdivision) college football. The Naval Academy completed its final season as an FBS independent school (not in a conference) in 2014, and became a single-sport member of the American Athletic Conference, now known as the American Conference, beginning in the 2015 season. The team is currently coached by Brian Newberry, who was promoted in 2022, following his stint as the Midshipmen defensive coordinator. Navy has 19 players and three coaches in the College Football Hall of Fame and won the college football national championship in 1926 according to the Boand and Houlgate poll systems. The 1910 team also was undefeated and unscored upon (the lone tie was a 0–0 game). The mascot is Bill the Goat. Attendance of home football games is required for all students. Members of the Billy the Kid Club can attend home football games for free.

Navy competes with their historic rivals Army in the Army–Navy Game, traditionally the final game of the college football regular season. The three major service academies—Army, Navy, and Air Force—compete for the Commander-in-Chief's Trophy.

== History ==
=== Early history (1879–1949) ===
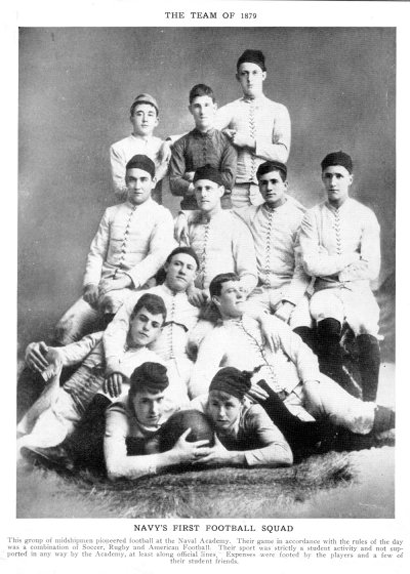
Navy's first football team gathered for a team portrait in 1879

The Naval Academy's football program is one of the nation's oldest, with its history dating back to 1879. There were two separate efforts to establish a Naval Academy football team in 1879. The first was guided by first-classman J.H. Robinson, who developed it as a training regiment to help keep the school's baseball team in shape. The team played the sport under rules that made it much closer to soccer, where the players were permitted only to kick the ball in order to advance it. The second effort, headed by first-classman William John Maxwell was more successful in its efforts. Maxwell met with two of his friends, Tunstall Smith and Henry Woods, who played for the Baltimore Athletic Club and officially challenged their team to a game with the Naval Academy. A team was formed from academy first-classmen, which Maxwell led as a manager, trainer, and captain. The team would wake up and practice before reveille and following drill and meals. The squad received encouragement from some of the faculty, who allowed them to eat a late dinner and skip final drill for additional practicing. This was against the direct orders of the school superintendent, who had banned football and similar activities.

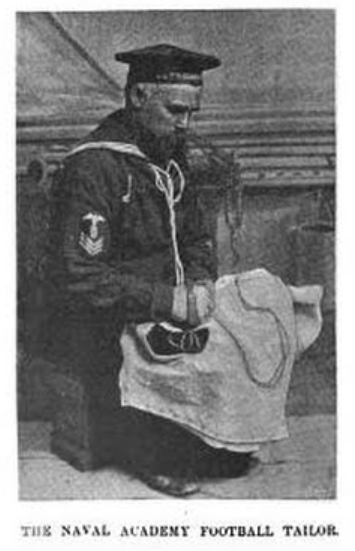
The 1879 team introduced a white canvas jacket uniform (shown being tailored, c. 1892) which is believed to be the first in college football

The year's sole contest was played on December 11 against the Baltimore Athletic Club. The opposition's team was reportedly composed of players from Princeton, Yale, Pennsylvania, and Johns Hopkins. The Naval Academy hosted the Baltimore team on a temporary field drawn on part of the superintendent's cow pasture. Rules decided upon between the teams established that the game was to be played under rugby rules.

The game was closely fought and was finally declared a scoreless tie by the referee about an hour after it began. Navy reportedly never gained possession of the ball. However, the Naval Academy managed to keep the Baltimore Athletic Club from ever being in a scoring position. On three separate occasions, Navy forced Baltimore back into its own end zone for a safety; these were not worth any points until 1882, however, so they offered Navy no benefit. The American and Chronicle reported that Maxwell, Craven, and Sample of Navy gave the strongest performances, but were also reckless in their play and were repeatedly penalized for jumping offside or kicking the ball out of play, a form of delay of game.

Some time after the game, Walter Camp, known as the "Father of American Football", credited Maxwell as the inventor of the first football uniform. After he was informed that the Baltimore team he was playing outweighed his by an average of ten pounds, Maxwell looked for a way to make the teams more evenly matched. Using his knowledge of sailing, he decided to design a sleeveless canvas jacket which would make his players "difficult to grasp when they began to sweat". He presented the design to the academy's tailor, who created the double-lined jackets which "were laced down the front and drawn tightly to fit snugly around a player's body". The weighted suits were worn by the team, which was confused by the "strangle, heavy, newfangled getups".

The Naval Academy would not produce another football team until the 1882 season. The 1882 team would be the first with a coach, being supported by Academy officials. The 1879 season was the last time that a Navy squad would play the Baltimore Athletic Club. Navy would finish the 1880s with four winning seasons, and an overall record of 14–12–2, with one of those ties being the game against the Baltimore Athletic Club. Navy would outscore their opponents 292–231, and would finish the 19th century with an overall record of 54–19–3. The lack of a coach for the 1879 season was one of the two times the Naval Academy squad lacked one, the other time being from 1883 through 1891.

Frank Berrien served as Navy's head football coach from 1908 to 1910, compiling a record of 21–5–3. He was the thirteenth head coach of the Naval Academy's football program and, under his tutelage, the Midshipmen compiled an undefeated 8–0–1 mark in 1910.

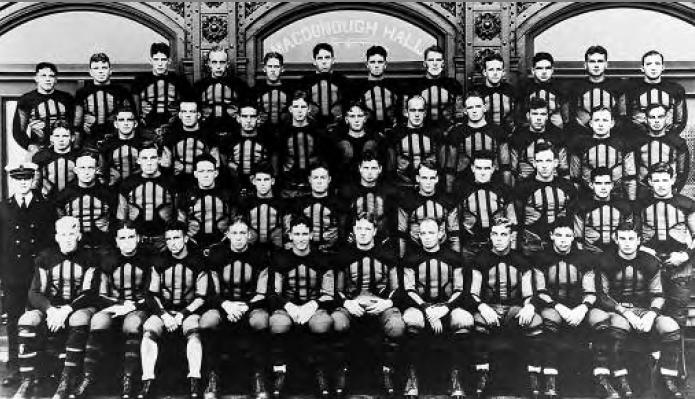
The team that won the 1926 national championship

Three undefeated teams with nearly identical records would cause a stir among fans and pollsters today, but this was the case when Navy earned its lone national championship in 1926, as the Midshipmen shared the honor with Stanford and Alabama. A 7–7 tie between Alabama and Stanford in the 1926 Rose Bowl gave Stanford a 10–0–1 mark, while the Crimson Tide and the Mids each had identical 9–0–1 records.

The Midshipmen opened the '26 season with a new coach, Bill Ingram. A Navy football standout from 1916 through 1918, Ingram took over a Navy team that had only won seven games in the previous two seasons combined. One of the keys to Navy's 1926 squad was a potent offense led by All-America tackle and team captain Frank Wickhorst, who proved to be a punishing blocker for the Navy offense. One member of the Navy offense that appreciated the blocking of Wickhorst was Tom Hamilton. The quarterback and kicker had a pair of 100-yard rushing games en route to All-America honors.

Navy's biggest win that year was against Michigan in front of 80,000 fans in Baltimore. The Mids scored 10 second half points to upset the Wolverines, 10–0. Navy's offense tallied 165 yards behind the powering attack of Hamilton and Henry Caldwell who scored Navy's lone touchdown on a one-yard plunge. Jubilation from the victory continued after the game, as the Midshipmen tore down the goal post at each end of the field and carried away all the markers that lined both sides of the field.

Navy headed into its season finale against Army with a 9–0 record. The game was to be played in Chicago at Soldier Field, which had been built as a memorial to the men killed in World War I. It was only natural Army and Navy would be invited to play the inaugural contest there. James R. Harrison of the New York Times described the game as "the greatest of its time and as a national spectacle." Over 110,000 people witnessed the Midshipmen open up a 14–0 lead on the Cadets, only to see Army fight back to take a 21–14 lead early in the third quarter. The Navy offense responded behind its strong ground game led by running back Alan Shapley. On fourth down and three yards to go, Shapley ran eight yards for a touchdown to tie the game at 21. As the final quarter concluded, Army mounted a brief threat only to miss a 25-yard field goal.

The tie gave the Midshipmen a share of the national championship based on retroactive rankings by both the William Boand and Deke Houlgate mathematical poll systems.

Navy was one of the very few programs to field a football team during World War II, with John Whelchel leading the Midshipmen from 1942 to 1943 and Oscar Hagberg serving as head coach from 1944 to 1945. During those years, three of the four Navy teams finished ranked in the top 10 of the final AP poll.

George Sauer left his post as Kansas head coach and took over in Annapolis from 1948 to 1949. The Midshipmen struggled under Sauer's tutelage, posting a 3–13–2 record which included a winless 1948 season.

=== Eddie Erdelatz era (1950–1958) ===
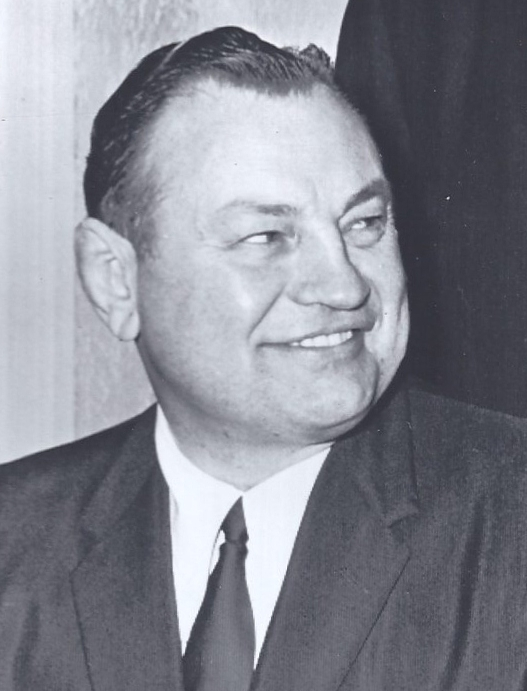
Eddie Erdelatz coached the Midshipmen from 1950 to 1958

Eddie Erdelatz returned to Navy, where he'd previously served as an assistant coach from 1945 to 1947, to take over a football program that had won just four games over the previous five seasons.

In 1950, Erdelatz led an upset of arch-rival Army. The Black Knights entered the game with an 8–0 record which had not lost in 28 contests. Army also had defeated Navy five times in the last six games. Although Navy had only a 2–6 record, an outstanding defensive effort resulted in a 14–2 victory for the Midshipmen.

After two years at Navy, Erdelatz's record stood at 5–12–1, but he would never again have a losing season in his final seven seasons and would finish 5–3–1 in his games against Army. In 1954, the team finished 8–2, losing close games to Pittsburgh and Notre Dame. Erdelatz labeled this squad, "A Team Called Desire" and then went on to shut out Ole Miss in the 1955 Sugar Bowl. Three years later, the Midshipmen competed in the Cotton Bowl Classic, where they knocked off Rice University, 20–7. The latter win came one year after Navy's bid to play in a bowl game was rejected despite having only one loss.

After the bowl victory over Rice, Erdelatz was courted by other schools and nearly accepted the task of replacing Bear Bryant at Texas A&M University. After the 1958 season, he was also seen as a candidate for the NFL's San Francisco 49ers head coaching job, but began spring practice the following year at Navy. On April 8, 1959, Erdelatz resigned as head coach of the Midshipmen, citing a number of factors, including the desire for an easier schedule.

=== Wayne Hardin era (1959–1964) ===
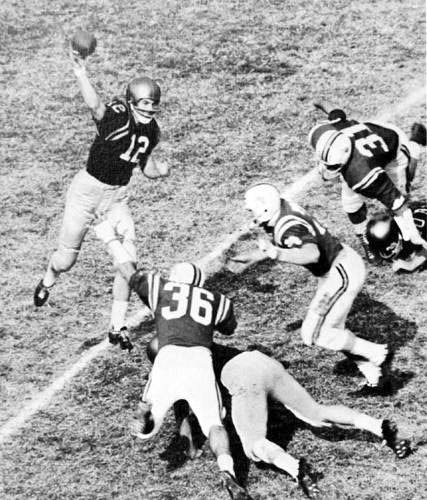
QB Roger Staubach (#12) won the Heisman Trophy in 1963. His number was retired by the Midshipmen

From 1959 to 1964, Wayne Hardin was the head coach at Navy, where he compiled a 38–22–2 record. His Navy teams posted five consecutive wins against archrival Army, a feat not surpassed until 2007 when Paul Johnson's Navy squad won their sixth consecutive contest in the Army–Navy Game. Hardin coached Navy's two winners of the Heisman Trophy, Joe Bellino, who received the award in 1960, and Roger Staubach, who did so in 1963. Hardin was the first to coach an African-American player at Navy when Calvin Huey earned a letter in 1964.

Hardin resigned as Navy's head coach following a 3–6–1 record in 1964.

=== Bill Elias era (1965–1968) ===
Virginia head coach Bill Elias replaced Hardin, and the Midshipmen struggled mightily under Elias' leadership. Elias' Midshipmen posted a 15–22–3 record in his four seasons, which included three non-winning seasons. Elias was fired following a 2–8 season in 1968.

=== Rick Forzano era (1969–1972) ===
Former UConn head coach Rick Forzano was hired as Elias' replacement in 1969. However, the Midshipmen's struggles continued, with Navy failing to post a single winning season, something that hadn't occurred in Annapolis in decades. Forzano's teams posted yearly records of 1–9, 2–9, 3–8 and 4–7. Forzano resigned after the 1972 season.

=== George Welsh era (1973–1981) ===
Penn State assistant coach and Navy alum George Welsh succeeded Forzano as Navy's head coach. He inherited a Navy Midshipmen football program that had only had one winning season since the days of Roger Staubach. He led the Midshipmen to three bowl game appearances and their first nine-win season in 16 years. In nine seasons, Welsh compiled a record of 55–46–1, making him the service academy's most successful coach.

In 1982, Welsh left Navy to become the head coach at Virginia.

=== Gary Tranquill era (1982–1986) ===
West Virginia offensive coordinator Gary Tranquill was hired as Welsh's replacement in 1982. Tranquill's Midshipmen compiled a 6–5 record in 1982, but it was downhill from there. 1983 saw a 3–8 record followed by back-to-back four-win seasons in 1984 and 1985. A 3–8 campaign in 1986 ended Tranquill's tenure at Navy as the school declined to renew his contract.

One notable assistant coach during this time was Nick Saban, the former head coach at Alabama.

=== Elliot Uzelac era (1987–1989) ===
Former Western Michigan head coach Elliot Uzelac was hired by Navy to serve as the school's 34th head football coach in 1987. Navy's struggles continued, with the Midshipmen posting records of 2–9 in 1987 followed by back-to-back 3–8 seasons in 1988 and 1989. Uzelac was fired following the 1989 season.

=== George Chaump era (1990–1994) ===
Marshall head coach George Chaump was hired as Uzelac's replacement in 1990. Chaump was unable to revive the Midshipmen football program, compiling a record of 14–41 in five seasons. Chaump's Midshipmen posted back-to-back 1–10 records in 1991 and 1992. Navy fired Chaump after the 1994 season in which the Midshipmen finished 3–8.

=== Charlie Weatherbie era (1995–2001) ===
Utah State head coach Charlie Weatherbie was hired to replace Chaump in 1995. Under Weatherbie, Navy did have a couple of winning seasons, the first coming in 1996 with a record of 9–3 with a win in the Aloha Bowl. That was followed with a 7–4 campaign the following year. After that, however, Navy struggled, failing to post a record better than a 5–7 record. After a 1–10 season in 2000 followed by an 0–7 start to the 2001 season, Weatherbie was fired.

=== Paul Johnson era (2002–2007) ===
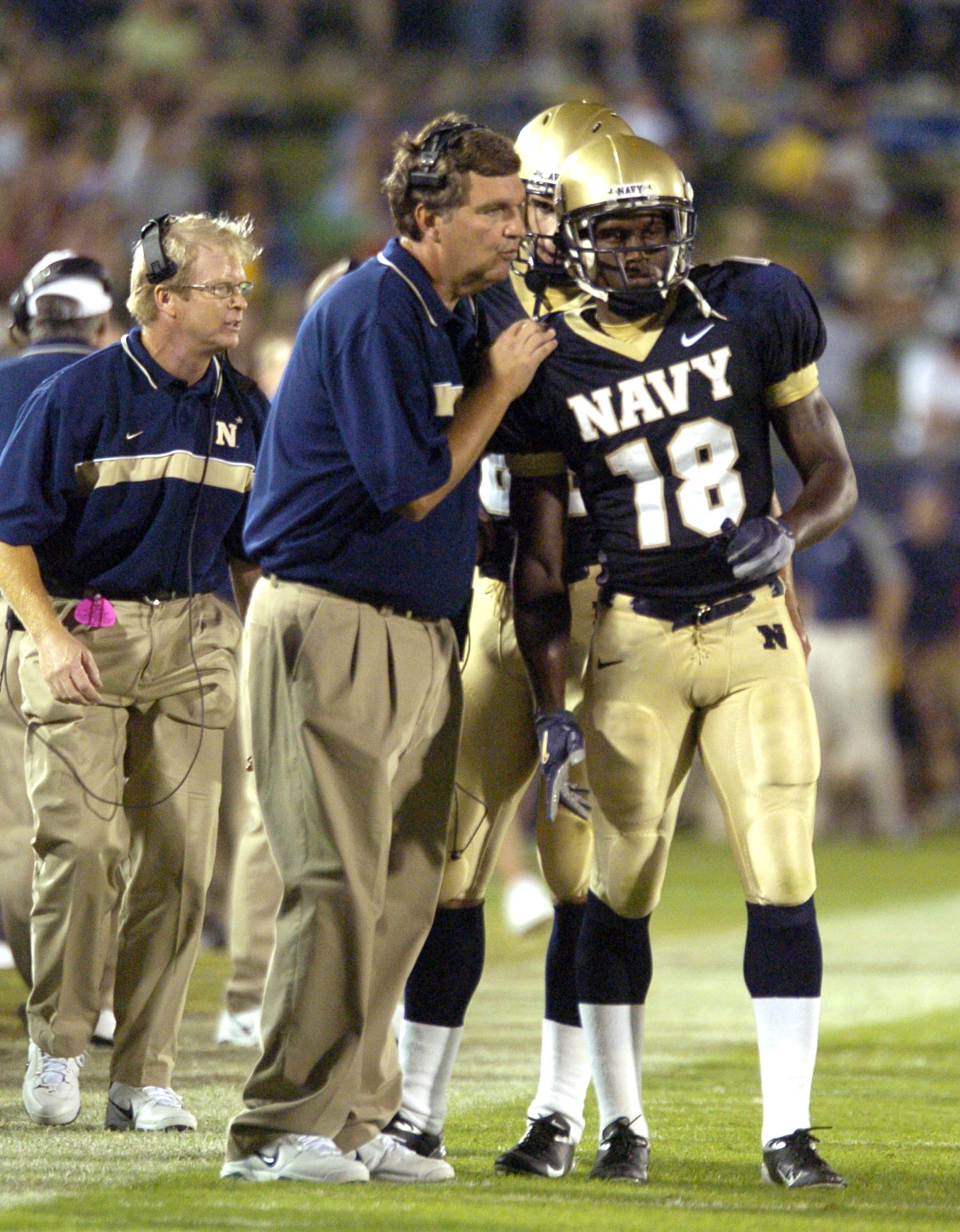
Coach Paul Johnson instructs a player during a game against Duke in 2004

In 2002, Paul Johnson departed Georgia Southern and was hired as the 37th Navy head football coach. Johnson's initial season saw the Midshipmen win only two of 12 games, though the season ended on a high note with his first victory over Army, which would not beat Navy again until 2016. Subsequently, Johnson's teams enjoyed a high degree of success.

The 2003 team completed the regular season with an 8–4 mark, including wins over both Air Force and Army, and earned a berth in the Houston Bowl, Navy's first bowl game since 1996. However, the Midshipmen lost to Texas Tech, 38–14.

In 2004, Johnson's team posted the program's best record since 1957, finishing the regular season at 9–2 and once again earning a bowl berth, this time in the Emerald Bowl. There Johnson coached the Midshipmen to a win over New Mexico, 34–19, the fifth bowl win in the school's history. The win gave Navy 10 wins on the season, tying a school record that had stood since 1905. For his efforts, Johnson received the Bobby Dodd Coach of the Year Award.

The 2005 Navy squad recorded a mark of 8–4, highlighted by victories over Army, Air Force, and Colorado State in the Poinsettia Bowl.

In 2007, Johnson coached the Midshipmen to their first win over rival Notre Dame since 1963, winning 46–44 in triple-overtime. Navy finished the season with an 8–5 record.

Johnson dominated the Commander-in-Chief's Trophy competition, going 11–1 (.917) in his six years, with the only loss against another service academy coming at the hands of Air Force in his first season. He was the first coach in Navy's history to go 6–0 in his first six seasons against Army (Ken Niumatalolo, who followed Johnson at Navy, went 8–0 against Army in his first eight seasons), and his 2006 senior class was the first in Navy history to win the Commander-in-Chief's Trophy all four of their years.

Much of Johnson's success at Navy was predicated on his triple option flexbone offense, a run-oriented attack that led NCAA Division I-A/FBS football in rushing yards three of his last four years at Navy. Johnson departed Navy for the head coaching position at Georgia Tech after the end of the 2007 regular season.

=== Ken Niumatalolo era (2008–2022) ===
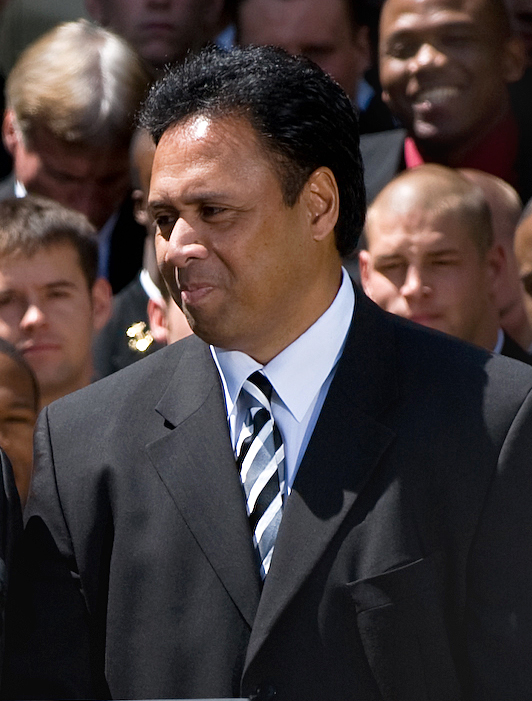
Ken Niumatalolo (here pictured in 2008) is the most winning coach in the history of the Midshipmen

Ken Niumatalolo was promoted from offensive line coach to head football coach of the Naval Academy football team on December 8, 2007, after Johnson's departure for Georgia Tech. Niumatalolo was the 38th head football coach in Naval Academy history. On January 7, 2009, Niumatalolo was given a contract extension, although terms and length of the extension were not released.

With Niumatalolo as Navy's head coach, beginning with the 2008 season, the Mids continued their run of success. Highlights in 2008 included an upset in Winston-Salem over No. 16 Wake Forest, 24–17, the Mids' first victory over a ranked team in 23 years, and a 34–0 shutout victory of Army. In 2016, the Midshipmen upset 6th-ranked Houston at Navy-Marine Corps Memorial Stadium 46-40 for their first win over a team ranked in the top 10 since defeating South Carolina in 1984.

Other highlights of Niumatalolo's years as head coach at Navy include: Navy defeated Army in each of Niumatalolo's first eight seasons as head coach, not losing to Army until 2016. The 2016 loss ended a streak of 14 Midshipmen wins in the Army–Navy Game, the longest winning streak for either side in the rivalry. The Midshipmen captured the Commander-in-Chief's Trophy in 2008, 2009 and 2012. They went on to capture the trophy outright in 2013, with a 34–7 win against Army, and recaptured it outright in 2015 with wins over Army and Air Force. The Midshipmen have nine winning seasons during Niumatalolo's 11 full years as head coach. The Mids have played in nine bowl games during Niumatalolo's tenure, winning the 2009 Texas Bowl, 2013 Armed Forces Bowl, 2014 Poinsettia Bowl, and 2015 Military Bowl. Navy defeated longtime rival Notre Dame in consecutive years, 2009 and 2010, for the first time since the early 1960s. The Midshipmen also defeated Notre Dame in 2016, when the Midshipmen went on to finish with a 9–5 record.

Niumatalolo led Navy into the American Athletic Conference after 134 years as an independent in 2015, the first time Navy joined a conference in the school's history.

Following the 2022 campaign, Niumatalolo was fired following a loss to Army.

=== Brian Newberry era (2023–present) ===
Brian Newberry, who had served as defensive coordinator since 2019, was hired as the head coach on December 19, 2022.

== Conference affiliations ==
- Independent (1879–2014)
- American Conference (2015–present)

== Championships ==
=== National championships ===
Season	Coach	Selector	Record	Final AP	Final Coaches
1926	Bill Ingram	Boand System, Houlgate System	9–0–1	–	–

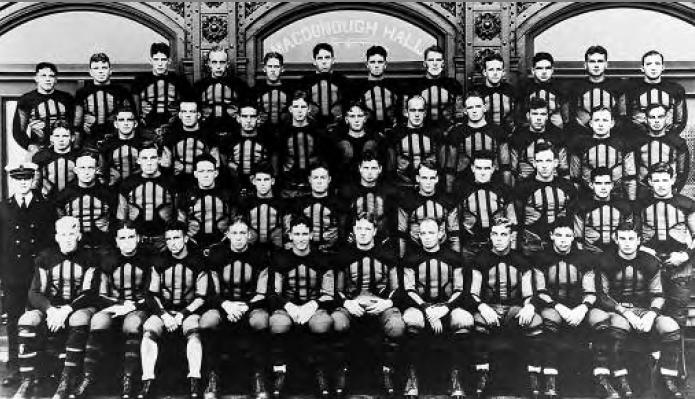
1926 national championship team

Three undefeated teams with nearly identical records would cause a stir among fans and pollsters today, but this was the case when Navy earned its lone national championship in 1926, as the Midshipmen shared the honor with Stanford and Alabama. A 7–7 tie between Alabama and Stanford in the 1927 Rose Bowl gave Stanford a 10–0–1 mark, while the Crimson Tide and the Mids each had identical 9–0–1 records.

The Midshipmen opened the '26 season with a new coach, Bill Ingram. A Navy football standout from 1916 through 1918, Ingram took over a Navy team that had only won seven games in the previous two seasons combined. One of the keys to Navy's 1926 squad was a potent offense led by All-America tackle and team captain Frank Wickhorst, who proved to be a punishing blocker for the Navy offense. One member of the Navy offense that appreciated the blocking of Wickhorst was Tom Hamilton. The quarterback and kicker had a pair of 100-yard rushing games en route to All-America honors.

Navy's biggest win that year was against Michigan in front of 80,000 fans in Baltimore. The Mids scored 10 second half points to upset the Wolverines, 10–0. Navy's offense tallied 165 yards behind the powering attack of Hamilton and Henry Caldwell who scored Navy's lone touchdown on a one-yard plunge. Jubilation from the victory continued after the game, as the Midshipmen tore down the goal post at each end of the field and carried away all the markers that lined both sides of the field.

Navy headed into its season finale against Army with a 9–0 record. The game was to be played in Chicago at Soldier Field, which had been built as a memorial to the men killed in World War I. It was only natural Army and Navy would be invited to play the inaugural contest there. James R. Harrison of the New York Times described the game as "the greatest of its time and as a national spectacle." Over 110,000 people witnessed the Midshipmen open up a 14–0 lead on the Cadets, only to see Army fight back to take a 21–14 lead early in the third quarter. The Navy offense responded behind its strong ground game led by running back Alan Shapley. On fourth down and three yards to go, Shapley ran eight yards for a touchdown to tie the game at 21. As the final quarter concluded, Army mounted a brief threat only to miss a 25-yard field goal.

The tie gave the Midshipmen a share of the national championship based on retroactive rankings by both the William Boand and Deke Houlgate mathematical poll systems.

=== Lambert Trophy ===
The Lambert-Meadowlands Trophy, established in 1936, is an annual award given to the best team in the Northeastern United States in Division I FBS college football and is presented by the Metropolitan New York Football Writers. Navy has won the trophy six times.

Year	Coach	Record	Final AP rank
1943	John Whelchel	8–1	#4
1954	Eddie Erdelatz	8–2	#5
1957	Eddie Erdelatz	9–1–1	#5
1960	Wayne Hardin	9–2	#4
1963	Wayne Hardin	9–2	#2
2015	Ken Niumatalolo	11–2	#18

=== Division championships ===
Season	Division	Coach	Opponent	CG result
2015†	AAC West	Ken Niumatalolo	N/A lost tiebreaker to Houston	
2016	AAC West	Ken Niumatalolo	Temple	L 10–34
2019†	AAC West	Ken Niumatalolo	N/A lost tiebreaker to Memphis	

† Co-champions

== Bowl games ==
Navy has participated in 26 bowl games, garnering a record of 14–11–1.

Season	Head coach	Bowl	Opponent	Result
1923	Bob Folwell	Rose Bowl	Washington	T 14–14
1954	Eddie Erdelatz	Sugar Bowl	Ole Miss	W 21–0
1957	Eddie Erdelatz	Cotton Bowl	Rice	W 20–7
1960	Wayne Hardin	Orange Bowl	Missouri	L 14–21
1963	Wayne Hardin	Cotton Bowl	Texas	L 6–28
1978	George Welsh	Holiday Bowl	BYU	W 23–16
1980	George Welsh	Garden State Bowl	Houston	L 0–35
1981	George Welsh	Liberty Bowl	Ohio State	L 28–31
1996	Charlie Weatherbie	Aloha Bowl	California	W 43–38
2003	Paul Johnson	Houston Bowl	Texas Tech	L 14–38
2004	Paul Johnson	Emerald Bowl	New Mexico	W 34–19
2005	Paul Johnson	Poinsettia Bowl	Colorado State	W 51–30
2006	Paul Johnson	Meineke Car Care Bowl	Boston College	L 24–25
2007	Ken Niumatalolo	Poinsettia Bowl	Utah	L 32–35
2008	Ken Niumatalolo	EagleBank Bowl	Wake Forest	L 19–29
2009	Ken Niumatalolo	Texas Bowl	Missouri	W 35–13
2010	Ken Niumatalolo	Poinsettia Bowl	San Diego State	L 14–35
2012	Ken Niumatalolo	Kraft Fight Hunger Bowl	Arizona State	L 28–62
2013	Ken Niumatalolo	Armed Forces Bowl	Middle Tennessee	W 24–6
2014	Ken Niumatalolo	Poinsettia Bowl	San Diego State	W 17–16
2015	Ken Niumatalolo	Military Bowl	Pittsburgh	W 44–28
2016	Ken Niumatalolo	Armed Forces Bowl	Louisiana Tech	L 45–48
2017	Ken Niumatalolo	Military Bowl	Virginia	W 49–7
2019	Ken Niumatalolo	Liberty Bowl	Kansas State	W 20–17
2024	Brian Newberry	Armed Forces Bowl	Oklahoma	W 21–20
2025	Brian Newberry	Liberty Bowl	Cincinnati	W 35–13

== Head coaches ==
Brian Newberry became the head coach in 2023.

Coach (Alma Mater)	Seasons	Years	Games	W	L	T	Pct.
Vaulx Carter (USNA)	1	1882	1	1	0	0	1.000
Ben Crosby (Yale)	1	1892	7	5	2	0	.714
Josh Hartwell (Yale)	1	1893	8	5	3	0	.625
Bill Wurtenburg (Yale)	1	1894	7	4	1	2	.714
Matt McClung (Lehigh)	1	1895	7	5	2	0	.714
Johnny Poe (Princeton)	1	1896	8	5	3	0	.625
Bill Armstrong (Yale)	3	1897–1899	25	19	5	1	.780
Garrett Cochran (Princeton)	1	1900	9	6	3	0	.667
Doc Hillebrand (Princeton)	2	1901–1902	21	8	11	2	.429
Burr Chamberlain (Yale)	1	1903	12	4	7	1	.375
Paul Dashiell (Lehigh)	3	1904	34	25	5	4	.794
Joe Reeves (USNA)	1	1907	12	9	2	1	.741
Frank Berrien (USNA)	3	1908–1910	29	21	5	3	.776
Doug Howard (USNA)	4	1911–1914	36	25	7	4	.750
Jonas H. Ingram (USNA)	2	1915–1916	19	9	8	2	.526
Gil Dobie (Minnesota)	3	1917–1919	20	17	3	0	.850
Bob Folwell (Penn)	5	1920–1924	38	24	12	2	.658
Jack Owsley (Yale)	1	1925	8	5	2	1	.688
Bill Ingram (USNA)	5	1926–1930	49	32	13	4	.694
Rip Miller (Notre Dame)	3	1931–1933	29	12	15	2	.448
Tom Hamilton (USNA)	5	1934–1936, 1946–1947	45	21	23	1	.478
Hank Hardwick (USNA)	2	1937–1938	18	8	7	3	.528
Swede Larson (USNA)	3	1939–1941	27	16	8	3	.648
Billick Whelchel (USNA)	2	1942–1943	18	13	5	0	.722
Oscar Hagberg (USNA)	2	1944–1945	18	13	4	1	.750
George Sauer (Nebraska)	2	1948–1949	18	3	13	2	.222
Eddie Erdelatz (St. Mary's)	9	1950–1958	84	50	26	8	.643
Wayne Hardin (Coll. of Pacific)	6	1959–1964	62	38	22	2	.629
Bill Elias (Maryland)	4	1965–1968	40	15	22	3	.413
Rick Forzano (Kent State)	4	1969–1972	43	10	33	0	.233
George Welsh (USNA)	9	1973–1981	102	55	46	1	.544
Gary Tranquill (Wittenberg)	5	1982–1986	55	20	34	1	.373
Elliot Uzelac (W. Michigan)	3	1987–1989	33	8	25	0	.242
George Chaump (Bloomsburg)	5	1990–1994	55	14	41	0	.255
Charlie Weatherbie (Okla. St.)	7	1995–2001	75	30	45	0	.400
Rick Lantz (Central Conn. St.)	<1	2001	3	0	3	0	.000
Paul Johnson (W. Carolina)	6*	2002–2007	74	45	29	0	.608
Ken Niumatalolo (Hawaiʻi)	15*	2007–2022	192	109	83	0	.568
Brian Newberry (Baylor)	3	2023–present	38	26	12	0	.684

== Rivalries ==
=== Air Force ===
The Commander-in-Chief's Trophy is awarded to each season's winner of the triangular college football series among the United States Military Academy (Army), the United States Naval Academy (Navy), and the United States Air Force Academy (Air Force). Navy controlled the trophy from 2003 to 2009, marking one of the longest times any academy has had possession of the prestigious trophy.

Typically, the Navy–Air Force game is played in early October followed by Army-Navy in early December.

When Navy has possession of the trophy, it is displayed in a glass case in Bancroft Hall, the Midshipmen's dormitory. Navy has won 17 Commander-in-Chief's Trophies (1973, 1975, 1978, 1979, 1981, 2003, 2004, 2005, 2006, 2007, 2008, 2009, 2012, 2013, 2015, 2019, 2024).

=== Army ===
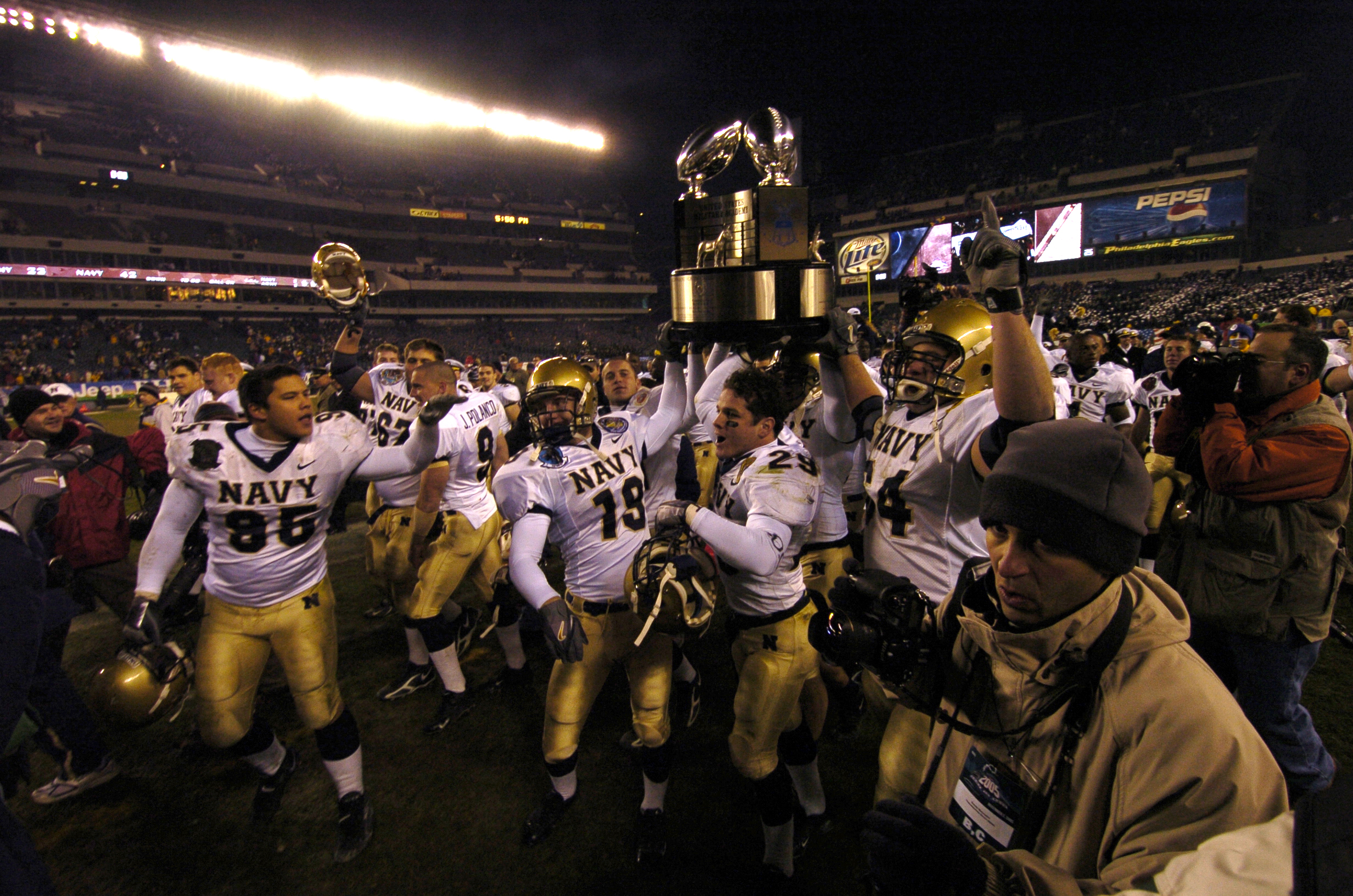
Navy celebrates after winning the 2005 Army–Navy Game on December 3, 2005.

The Army-Navy Game, played annually on the last weekend of the college football regular season in early December, pits the football teams of the U.S. Military Academy at West Point, New York (Army) against the Navy Midshipmen. It is one of the most traditional and enduring rivalries in college football, and is televised every year by CBS. It was in the 1963 Army–Navy game that instant replay made its television debut.

This game has always had inter-service "bragging rights" at stake; in past decades, when both Army and Navy were often national powers, the game occasionally had national championship implications. However, as top-level college football had developed and grown, the high academic entrance requirements, height and weight limits, and the military commitment required of West Point and Annapolis graduates has reduced the overall competitiveness of both academies in comparison with other football programs.

During wartime, the game is even more emotional because some seniors may not return once they are deployed. For instance, in the 2004 game, at least one senior from the class of 2003 who was killed in Iraq, Navy's J. P. Blecksmith, was remembered. The players placed their comrade's pads and jerseys on chairs on the sidelines. Much of the sentiment of the game goes out to those who share the uniform and who are overseas.

Army-Navy is played in early December, typically in Philadelphia. The game, however, has also been played in other locations such as New York, Baltimore, Chicago, and Pasadena.

=== Maryland ===
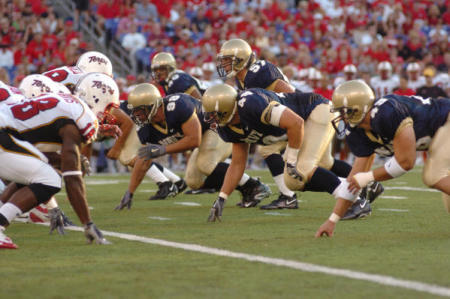
A snap during the 2005 Navy-Maryland game.

The intrastate rivalry between Maryland and Navy is referred to as the "Crab Bowl Classic." Starting in 1905, the two teams have played sporadically over the years. Many of the early games were lopsided and Navy leads the series 14–7. In 2005, the teams renewed their rivalry and Maryland won, 23–20. The teams met again on Labor Day 2010 and Maryland won again, 17–14, after the Terps' goal-line stand with under a minute remaining. As of 2010, the winner of the Crab Bowl Classic is awarded the Crab Bowl Trophy, created by the Touchdown Club of Annapolis with underwriting from the D'Camera Group.

=== Notre Dame ===
Navy has played Notre Dame in 99 annual games without interruption since 1927 and trails in the series 13–83–1 through the 2026 season. Notre Dame plays this game to repay Navy for helping to keep Notre Dame financially afloat during World War II. This series is scheduled to continue indefinitely.

From 1963, when Navy beat Notre Dame 35–14, to 2006, Notre Dame won 43 consecutive games against Navy, the longest such streak in Division I-A football. This streak ended on November 3, 2007, when Navy beat Notre Dame 46–44 in triple overtime. Navy also bested Notre Dame in 2009 and 2010, which made the class of 2011 only the third class in Navy history to have beaten Notre Dame three times. Navy won 28–27 in 2016, making Coach Niumatalolo only the second coach in Navy history to defeat Notre Dame three times.

When Navy is the home team for this game in even-numbered years, the Midshipmen have hosted the game off-campus at large stadiums used by NFL teams, usually FedExField in Landover, Maryland or M&T Bank Stadium in Baltimore. The Midshipmen have also hosted the Irish at John F. Kennedy Stadium and Veterans Stadium in Philadelphia.

=== Pittsburgh ===
Navy and Pittsburgh recently renewed their rivalry, which began in 1912, and was played 26 times in 29 years between 1961 and 1989. The contest was then played consecutively between 2007 and 2009 and again in 2013. After a 44–28 victory for Navy in the 2015 Military Bowl in Annapolis, the series now stands with Pitt leading 22–15–3. Of historic interest, it was during the Pitt-Navy game at Annapolis on October 23, 1976, that Pitt running back Tony Dorsett broke the NCAA career rushing record.

=== Rutgers ===
This rivalry stems from Navy and Rutgers being two of the only three programs (the third is Army) to come out of the original, informal "Ivy League" that are still members of the top tier of NCAA college football (Division I-FBS). Although the two teams only began a regular series relatively recently in 1995, the games between the two schools are often close and sometimes have controversy as in the 2004 and 2007 editions of the series. The rivalry dates to 1891, making the two schools each other's oldest active football rivals. The schools have met 25 times, with Rutgers leading the series at 13–11–1 all-time after the 2014 Navy loss. Navy and Rutgers have played most years since 1995, but do not have additional games scheduled at this time with Rutgers' move to the Big Ten and Navy's move from independents to the American.

=== SMU ===
The Gansz Trophy was created in 2009 through a collaboration between the athletic departments of the Naval Academy and Southern Methodist University. The trophy is named for Frank Gansz who played linebacker at the Naval Academy from 1957 through 1959. Gansz later served on the coaching staffs at numerous colleges, including all three service academies and Southern Methodist, as well as several professional teams. The two teams have met 25 times with Navy leading the all-time series 13–12, and the trophy series 7–5.

=== Johns Hopkins ===
It is widely believed by football researchers that the playing of intercollegiate football began in November 1869, when a player at Rutgers University challenged another player at the nearby College of New Jersey (now Princeton). The contest more closely resembled soccer, with teams scoring by kicking the ball into the opponent's net, and lacked a uniform rules structure. The game developed slowly; the first rules were drafted in October 1873, and only consisted of twelve guidelines. Even though the number of teams participating in the sport increased, the game was still effectively controlled by the College of New Jersey, who claimed eight national championships in ten years. Only Yale presented any form of challenge, claiming four national championships in the same time period.

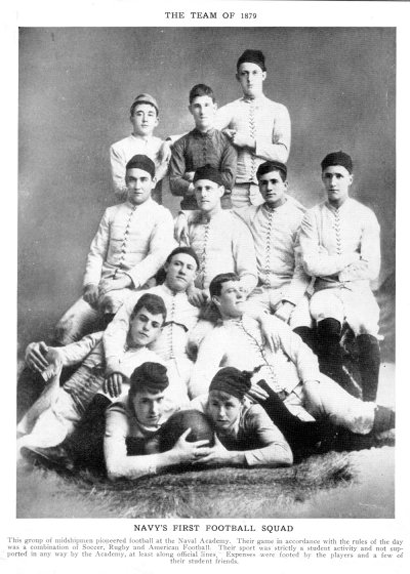
The official portrait of the 1879 Navy team

According to biographer C. Douglas Kroll, the first evidence of football at the United States Naval Academy came in 1857, but the school's cadets lost interest in the game shortly afterward. The first occurrence of serious interest in the sport came in 1879, when a squad of twelve cadets challenged men from the Baltimore Athletic Club to a contest. The team was captained by William John Maxwell, lacking "official" support from all academy supervisors. The team was student operated, and supported by the friends of the players. The 1879 game with Baltimore ended in a 0–0 tie, where the Naval Academy apparently never gained control of the ball. The team was credited with creating the first football uniform, worn during the game. Following the 1879 season, football at the Naval Academy went on a two-year hiatus, returning in 1882 under the leadership of Vaulx Carter.

Johns Hopkins University, located north of the Naval Academy, in Baltimore, started their football program a couple of years after Navy. Hopkins' first team was assembled in 1881, and spent an entire year training and learning a version of the game. Their sport, which was closer to rugby, was played in Druid Hill Park. After the training, the team planned a two-game 1882 season. The squad had to play the season under the title of the Clifton Athletic Club, due to the school's policy on the sport of football. The first was a practice game with the Baltimore Athletic Club, played on October 7. The Hopkins team lost the contest 4–0. The following game was their first true game, to be played against the Naval Academy.

== Individual award winners ==
=== Retired numbers ===
Navy Midshipmen retired numbers
No.	Player	Pos.	Tenure	No. ret.	Ref.
**12**	Roger Staubach	QB	1961–1963	1965	
**19**	Keenan Reynolds	QB	2012–2015	2016	
**27**	Joe Bellino	HB	1958–1960	1960	
**30**	Napoleon McCallum	RB	1981–1985		

=== Heisman Trophy ===
- Joe Bellino – 1960
- Roger Staubach – 1963

=== Maxwell Award ===
- Ronald Beagle – 1954
- Bob Reifsnyder – 1957
- Joe Bellino – 1960
- Roger Staubach – 1963

=== Other awards ===
- Percy Northcroft – All-American (1906, 1908)
- Zerbin Singleton – Disney's Wide World of Sports Spirit Award (2007)
- Keenan Reynolds – James E. Sullivan Award (2015)
- Blake Horvath – Division I Football Academic All-American of the Year (2025)

=== College Football Hall of Fame ===
Navy has 19 players and 3 coaches in the College Football Hall of Fame:

- Players (Position, Years Players, Year Inducted, Other School Played at (if any))
  - Ron Beagle (End, 1953–55, 1986) College HOF Bio
  - Joe Bellino (RB, 1958–60, 1977) College HOF Bio
  - Buzz Borries (HB, 1932–34, 1960) College HOF Bio
  - George Brown (G, 1942–43, 1947, 1985, San Diego State) College HOF Bio
  - John Brown (G / T, 1910–13, 1951) College HOF Bio
  - Slade Cutter (T, 1932–34, 1967) College HOF Bio
  - John Dalton (HB, 1908–11, 1970) College HOF Bio
  - Dick Duden (End, 1943–45, 2001) College HOF Bio
  - Steve Eisenhauer (T / G, 1951–53, 1994) College HOF Bio
  - Tom Hamilton (HB, 1924–26, 1965) College HOF Bio
  - Jonas H. Ingram (FB, 1904, 1906, 1968) College HOF Bio
  - Napoleon McCallum (RB, 1981–85, 2002) College HOF Bio
  - Skip Minisi (HB, 1944–47, 1985, Pennsylvania) College HOF Bio
  - Chet Moeller (S, 1973–75, 2010) College HOF Bio
  - Bob Reifsnyder (T, 1956–58, 1997) College HOF Bio
  - Clyde Scott (HB, 1944–48, 1971, Arkansas) College HOF Bio
  - Dick Scott (C, 1945–47, 1987) College HOF Bio
  - Roger Staubach (QB, 1962–64, 1981) College HOF Bio
  - Don Whitmire (T, 1941–44, 1956, Alabama) College HOF Bio
  - Frank Wickhorst (T, 1924–26, 1970) College HOF Bio
- Coaches (Year Inducted)
  - Gil Dobie (1951) College HOF Bio
  - Bill Ingram (1973) College HOF Bio
  - George Welsh (2004) College HOF Bio
  - Wayne Hardin (2013) College HOF Bio

=== CSC Academic All-Americans ===
CSC is College Sports Communicators, known before September 2022 as College Sports Information Directors of America (CoSIDA).

Academic All-American of the Year in bold.

Year	Player	Class	Team
1953–54	Steve Eisenhauer	'54	
1957–58	Tom Forrestal	'58	
1958–59	Joe Tranchini	'60	1st
1969–70	Dan Pike	'70	
1974–75	Tim Harden	'75	2nd
1975–76	Chet Moeller	'76	2nd
1979–80	Ted Dumbauld	'81	2nd
1980–81	Ted Dumbauld	'81	1st
1999–00	Terrence Anderson	'00	2nd
2009–10	John Dowd	'12	2nd
2010–11	John Dowd	'12	1st
2015–16	Thomas Wilson	'16	1st
2025–26	**Blake Horvath**	'26	1st

=== National Football Foundation and College Hall of Fame National Scholar-Athlete Awards ===
"The Most Prestigious Scholarships In College Football Since 1959"

- Joe Ince – 1963
- Alan Roodhouse – 1965
- Daniel Pike – 1969
- Timothy Harden – 1974
- Theodore Dumbauld – 1980
- Carl C. Voss – 1991
- Terrence Anderson – 1999

== Athletic Hall of Fame ==
For football players in the USNA Athletic Hall of Fame, see footnote. The Athletic Hall of Fame is housed in Lejeune Hall. Among the exhibits are two Heisman Trophies, won by Joe Bellino in 1960 and Roger Staubach in 1963.

== Facilities ==
- Navy–Marine Corps Memorial Stadium
- Ricketts Hall – This building contains the locker room for the varsity football team and offices for football, basketball, and lacrosse. It also contains the Jack Lengyel Sports Conditioning Facility, which is one of three "strength and conditioning facilities" at the academy. The weight-room facility serves football, men's lacrosse, baseball and wrestling.
- Rip Miller Field – Named for Edgar Miller, who was the Navy head football coach for three seasons (1931–1933). The field is used by both lacrosse and sprint football.
- Wesley Brown Field House – The field house has a full-length, 76,000-square-foot (7,100 m^{2}), retractable Magic Carpet AstroTurf football field.

== Future non-conference opponents ==
Announced schedules as of November 19, 2026.

2026	2027	2028	2029	2030	2031
Towson	The Citadel	Holy Cross	at Ohio State	Towson	at BYU
at Air Force	Air Force	at Air Force	Air Force	at Air Force	Air Force
vs. Notre Dame^{5}	at Notre Dame	vs. Notre Dame	at Notre Dame	vs. Notre Dame	at Notre Dame
vs. Army^{1}	vs. Army^{2}	vs. Army^{2}	vs. Army^{6}	vs. Army^{2}	vs. Army^{6}

1. At MetLife Stadium in East Rutherford, New Jersey.
2. At Lincoln Financial Field in Philadelphia, Pennsylvania.
3. At M&T Bank Stadium in Baltimore, Maryland.
4. At Northwest Stadium in Landover, Maryland.
5. At Gillette Stadium in Foxborough, Massachusetts
6. At TBA
