= 1958 Cotton Bowl Classic =

- 22nd Cotton Bowl Classic
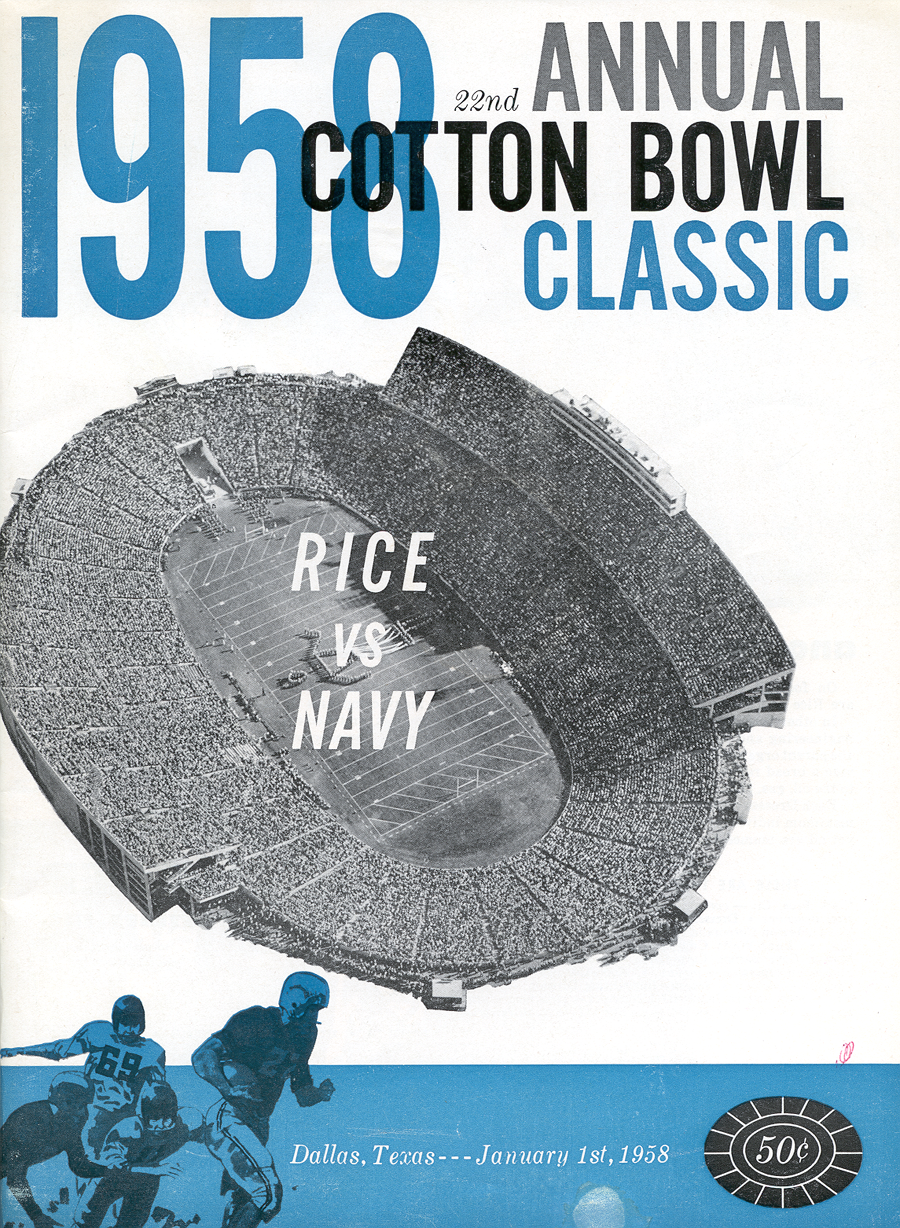
Navy Midshipmen	Rice Owls
(8–1–1)	(7–3)
Independent	SWC
20	7
Head coach: Eddie Erdelatz	Head coach: Jess Neely
AP / Coaches; 5 / 6	AP / Coaches; 8 / 7
	1	2	3	4	Total
Navy	6	7	7	0	20
Rice	0	0	7	0	7
- Date: January 1, 1958
- Season: 1957
- Stadium: Cotton Bowl
- Location: Dallas, Texas
- MVP: Tom Forrestal (Navy QB); Tony Stremic (Navy G)
- Favorite: Navy by 1 point
- Referee: Albie Booth (ECAC; split crew: ECAC, SWC)
- Attendance: 75,504
- Payout: US$160,000 per team

United States TV coverage
- Network: CBS
- Announcers: Tom Harmon, Forest Evashevski

The Cotton Bowl in Dallas, Texas, hosted the Cotton Bowl Classic.

The 1958 Cotton Bowl Classic was the 22nd edition of the college football bowl game, played at the Cotton Bowl in Dallas, Texas, on Wednesday, January 1. Part of the 1957–58 bowl game season, it matched the independent and fifth-ranked Navy Midshipmen and the No. 8 Rice Owls of the Southwest Conference (SWC). Slightly favored, Navy won 20–7.

== Teams ==
This was the only bowl game of the season that matched two top-ten teams in the final AP poll, which was released in early December. This was the first Cotton Bowl Classic televised by CBS.

=== Navy ===
The fifth-ranked Midshipmen (8–1–1) were favored by a point. They lost early in the season at North Carolina and tied #16 Duke in November. Notable late season wins were at #5 Notre Dame (20–6) and a shutout of #10 Army (14–0). It was Navy's third appearance in a major bowl and first Cotton Bowl.

=== Rice ===
The eighth-ranked Owls (7–3) had been to three previous Cotton Bowls, two within the decade, and finished first in the Southwest Conference for the fourth time in eleven years.

== Game summary ==
Rice never recovered after Navy led 13–0 at halftime on touchdown runs by Joe Tranchini and Harry Hurst. Team captain Ned Oldham added another early in the third quarter to give Navy a commanding 20–0 lead. Ken Williams—stepfather of pro wrestler Steve Austin—caught a touchdown pass from Frank Ryan to narrow the lead to 13, but Rice never seriously threatened from that point on. Navy outgained Rice on ground by 222 yards to 137 as the Owls committed six turnovers. Forrestal and Ryan both had 13 completions, which set a Cotton Bowl record.

=== Scoring ===
First quarter

- Navy – Joe Tranchini 1-yard run (Roland Brandquist kick failed)

Second quarter

- Navy – Harry Hurst 13-yard run (Ned Oldham kick)

Third quarter

- Navy – Oldham 19-yard run (Oldham kick)
- Rice – Ken Williams 8-yard pass from Frank Ryan (King Hill kick)

Fourth quarter

No scoring

== Aftermath ==
Rice did not win another conference championship until 1994; their next bowl win was in December 2008, and they have yet to return to the Cotton Bowl.

Navy reached the Cotton Bowl six years later (with Roger Staubach at quarterback), but lost to top-ranked Texas, and have not returned.
