= 1957 All-America college football team =

Official list of the best college football players of 1957

The 1957 All-America college football team is composed of college football players who were selected as All-Americans by various organizations and writers that chose All-America college football teams in 1957. The seven selectors recognized by the NCAA as "official" for the 1957 season are (1) the Associated Press, (2) the United Press, (3) the American Football Coaches Association (AFCA), (4) the Football Writers Association of America (FWAA), (5) the International News Service (INS), (6) the Newspaper Enterprise Association (NEA), and (7) the Sporting News. The ESPN College Football Encyclopedia lists the All-America Board (AAB) as an eighth official selector.

== Consensus All-Americans ==
For the year 1957, the NCAA awards guide lists seven published All-American teams as "official" designations for purposes of its consensus determinations. The ESPN College Football Encyclopedia lists the All-America Board (AAB) as an eighth official selector. The following chart identifies the NCAA-recognized consensus All-Americans and displays which first-team designations they received.

Name	Position	School	Number	Official	Other
Jim Phillips	End	Auburn	8/8	AAB, AFCA, AP, FWAA, INS, NEA, SN, UP	Time, WC
John David Crow	Back	Texas A&M	8/8	AAB, AFCA, AP, FWAA, INS, NEA, SN, UP	Time, WC
Alex Karras	Tackle	Iowa	7/8	AAB, AP, FWAA, INS, NEA, SN, UP	Time, WC
Lou Michaels	Tackle	Kentucky	7/8	AAB, AFCA, AP, FWAA, NEA, SN, UP	Time, WC
Bill Krisher	Guard	Oklahoma	7/8	AAB, AP, FWAA, INS, NEA, SN, UP	Time, WC
Dick Wallen	End	UCLA	6/8	AAB, AFCA, AP, FWAA, INS, NEA	Time, WC
Walt Kowalczyk	Back	Michigan State	5/8	AFCA, FWAA, NEA, SN, UP	Time, WC
Bob Anderson	Back	Army	5/8	FWAA, INS, NEA, SN, UP	Time, WC
Dan Currie	Center	Michigan State	5/8	AAB, AFCA, AP, FWAA, INS	Time, WC
King Hill	Quarterback	Rice	4/8	AAB, AFCA, AP, FWAA	Time
Al Ecuyer	Guard	Notre Dame	3/8	INS, SN, UP	Time, WC
Clendon Thomas	Back	Oklahoma	3/8	AFCA, SN, UP	WC

== All-American selections for 1957 ==
=== Ends ===
- Jim Phillips, Auburn (AAB, AFCA, AP-1, FWAA, INS-1, NEA-1, SN, UP-1, Time, WC)
- Dick Wallen, UCLA (AAB, AFCA, AP-1, FWAA, INS-1, NEA-1, UP-2, Time, WC)
- Jim Gibbons, Iowa (FWAA, INS-2, SN, AP-3, UP-1)
- Fred Dugan, Dayton (FWAA, AP-2)
- Les Walters, Penn State (AP-2)
- Dave Kaiser, Michigan State (UP-2)
- Dick Lasse, Syracuse (INS-2)
- Gary Kapp, Utah State (INS-2)
- Don Ellingsen, Washington State (AP-3, UP-3)
- Buddy Dial, Rice (INS-2, UP-3)

=== Tackles ===
- Alex Karras, Iowa (Outland Trophy, College and Pro Football Hall of Fame) (AAB, AP-1, FWAA, INS-1, NEA-1, SN, UP-1, Time, WC)
- Lou Michaels, Kentucky (AAB, AFCA, AP-1, FWAA, INS-2, NEA-1, SN, UP-1, Time, WC)
- Charlie Krueger, Texas A&M (AP-2, FWAA, INS-1, UP-2)
- Tom Topping, Duke (FWAA, AP-3)
- Jim McCusker, Pitt (AP-3, INS-2, UP-3)
- Bill Leeka, UCLA (INS-2)
- Larry Whitmire, Rice (INS-2)
- Nick Mumley, Purdue (INS-2)
- Dick Klein, Iowa (UP-3)

=== Guards ===
- Bill Krisher, Oklahoma (AAB, AP-1, FWAA, INS-1, NEA-1, SN, UP-1, Time, WC)
- Al Ecuyer, Notre Dame (AP-2, INS-1, SN, Time, UP-1, WC)
- Aurealius Thomas, Ohio State (AAB, AFCA, AP-1, FWAA, INS-2, UP-2)
- Bill Johnson, Tennessee (FWAA, NEA-1, AP-3, UP-3)
- Jackie Simpson, Mississippi (AFCA, FWAA, AP-2)
- Roy Hord, Jr., Duke (INS-2, UP-2)
- Stan Renning, Montana (INS-2)
- Don Wilson, Texas (INS-2)
- Joe Palermo, Dartmouth (AP-3, UP-3)

=== Centers ===
- Dan Currie, Michigan State (AAB, AFCA, AP-1, FWAA, INS-1, UP-2, Time, WC)
- Bob Reifsnyder, Navy (AFCA [tackle], AP-2, FWAA, NEA-1, UP-2)
- Don Stephenson, Georgia Tech (AP-3, INS-2, SN, UP-1)
- Bob Harrison, Oklahoma (AP-2)
- Charlie Brueckman, Pittsburgh (INS-2, UP-3)
- Jim Kernan, Army (INS-2)

=== Quarterbacks ===
- King Hill, Rice (AAB, AFCA, AP-1, FWAA, UP-3, Time)
- Lee Grosscup, Utah (AP-2, FWAA, INS-2, NEA-1, UP-2)
- Tom Forrestal, Navy (INS-1, AP-3, UP-2)
- Jim Van Pelt, Michigan (INS-2)
- Bob Newman, Washington State (INS-2, UP-3)

=== Backs ===
- John David Crow, Texas A&M (AAB, AFCA, AP-1, FWAA, INS-1, NEA-1, SN, UP-1, Time, WC)
- Walt Kowalczyk, Michigan State (AFCA, AP-2, FWAA, INS-2, NEA-1, SN, AFCA, UP-1, Time, WC)
- Bob Anderson, Army (AP-2, FWAA, INS-1, NEA-1, SN, UP-1, Time, WC)
- Clendon Thomas, Oklahoma (AFCA, INS-2, SN, UP-1, WC)
- Jim Pace, Michigan (AAB, AP-1, INS-2, UP-2)
- Dick Christy, North Carolina State (AAB, AP-1)
- Bob Stransky, Colorado (AP-2, FWAA, INS-1, UP-3)
- Jim Bakhtiar, Virginia (FWAA, AP-3)
- Jim Taylor, LSU (FWAA, AP-3)
- Don Clark, Ohio State (INS-2, UP-2)
- Jim Shanley, Oregon (INS-2)
- Billy Stacy, Mississippi State (INS-2)
- Reddy Osborne, Texas A&M (INS-2)
- Wray Carlton, Duke (INS-2)
- Bobby Mulgado, Arizona State (AP-3)
- Nick Pietrosante, Notre Dame (UP-3)

== Key ==
- **Bold** – Consensus All-American
- -1 – First-team selection
- -2 – Second-team selection
- -3 – Third-team selection

=== Official selectors ===
- AAB = All-America Board
- AFCA = American Football Coaches Association for Look magazine, selected by votes of 511 member coaches
- AP = Associated Press
- FWAA = Football Writers Association of America
- INS = International News Service
- NEA = Newspaper Enterprise Association
- SN = The Sporting News
- UP = United Press

=== Other selectors ===
- WC = Walter Camp Football Foundation
- Time = Time magazine, chosen December 16, 1957

== See also ==
- 1957 All-Atlantic Coast Conference football team
- 1957 All-Big Eight Conference football team
- 1957 All-Big Ten Conference football team
- 1957 All-Pacific Coast Conference football team
- 1957 All-SEC football team
- 1957 All-Southwest Conference football team
