= Eddie Erdelatz =

American football player and coach (1913–1966)

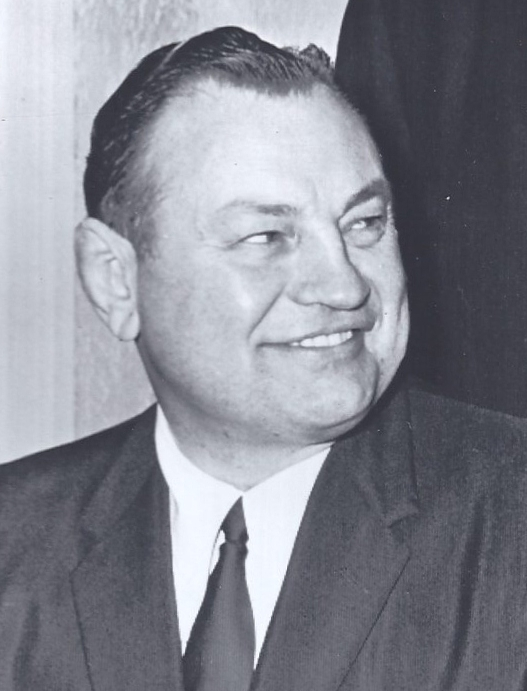
- Erdelatz in 1960

Biographical details
- Born: April 21, 1913; San Francisco, California, U.S.
- Died: November 10, 1966 (aged 53); Burlingame, California, U.S.

Playing career
- 1932–1934: Saint Mary's
- Position: End

Coaching career (HC unless noted)
- 1936–1937: Saint Mary's (line)
- 1938–1940: San Francisco (line)
- 1940–1941: Saint Mary's (line)
- 1945–1947: Navy (assistant)
- 1948–1949: San Francisco 49ers (DC)
- 1950–1958: Navy
- 1960–1961: Oakland Raiders

Head coaching record
- Overall: 50–26–8 (college); 6–10 (AFL)

Accomplishments and honors

Awards
- 2× Second-team All-PCC (1934, 1935)

Edward J. Erdelatz (April 21, 1913 – November 10, 1966) was an American collegiate and professional football player and coach who served as head football coach of the U.S. Naval Academy for nine years. He was drafted by the Chicago Cardinals, with the 23rd pick in the third round of the 1936 NFL Draft, but never played professionally.

Erdelatz was also the first head coach of the American Football League (AFL)'s Oakland Raiders.

== Early life ==
Erdelatz's mother died two weeks after his birth.

== College football ==
He played three years at end for St. Mary's College in California beginning in 1932 under head coach Slip Madigan. Erdelatz suffered a scraped leg that led to infection (and possible amputation) but failed to keep him off the field. He also had a shoulder separation and twisted his knee, but again the injuries failed to keep him from playing.

In 1936, Erdelatz became St. Mary's line coach under Madigan, then left St. Mary's for a similar position with the University of San Francisco two years later.

In 1940, he returned to St. Mary's for another two-year stint that was followed by service in the U.S. Navy during World War II. Erdelatz rose to the rank of lieutenant commander in 1945 and began the first of three years as a Navy assistant coach at the academy in Annapolis, Maryland. During this time, he helped develop end Dick Duden into an All-America.

Looking to return to California, Erdelatz accepted the defensive coordinator's position with the San Francisco 49ers of the All-America Football Conference in 1948. Two years later, he returned to Navy to take over a football program that had won just four games over the previous five seasons. The stress of rebuilding the program took its toll. The first year as Navy's head coach, Erdeletz lost 50 pounds to drop to 195.

In 1950, Erdelatz led an upset of arch-rival Army. The Black Knights entered the game with an 8–0 record which had not lost in 28 contests. Army also had defeated Navy five times in the last six games. Although Navy had only a 2–6 record, an outstanding defensive effort resulted in a 14–2 victory for the Midshipmen.

After two years at Navy, Erdelatz's record stood at 5–12–1, but he would never again have a losing season in his final seven seasons and would finish 5–3–1 in his games against Army. In 1954, the team finished 8–2, losing close games to Pittsburgh and Notre Dame. Erdelatz labeled this squad, "A Team Called Desire" and then went on to shut out the University of Mississippi in the 1955 Sugar Bowl. Three years later, the Midshipmen competed in the Cotton Bowl Classic, where they knocked off Rice University, 20–7. The latter win came one year after Navy's bid to play in a bowl game was rejected despite having only one loss. In 1956, Erdelatz hired Steve Belichick to be an assistant coach and scout, a position Belichick held until 1989.

After the bowl victory over Rice, Erdelatz was courted by other schools and nearly accepted the task of replacing Bear Bryant at Texas A&M University. After the 1958 season, he was also seen as a candidate for the 49ers' head coaching job, but began spring practice the following year at Navy. On April 8, 1959, Erdelatz resigned as head coach of the Midshipmen, citing a number of factors, including the desire for an easier schedule.

== Professional football ==
After rejecting an assistant coaching position with the National Football League's Washington Redskins, Erdelatz sat out the 1959 season, waiting for the inevitable job offers and worked as a volunteer swim instructor for the handicapped. Indicating interest in the top job at Boston College, Erdelatz was also seen as a candidate for the New York Giants' position, as well as at the University of Southern California and the University of California, Berkeley. The latter position was given to Marv Levy, with questions about Erdelatz's departure from Navy given as the reason.

Having rejected the AFL's Los Angeles Chargers the year before, Erdelatz raised eyebrows when he accepted the head coaching position with the new league's Oakland Raiders on February 9, 1960. The team, which was originally scheduled to play in Minnesota, was the last squad to select players and was limited in talent.

During his first season, the team struggled to a 6–8 record primarily because of a weak defense. Off the field, Erdelatz battled an ulcer. When ownership conflicts kept the team from signing any top draft picks the next season, Erdelatz watched the Raiders outscored 99–0 in their first two games, resulting in his dismissal on September 18, 1961.

After the year had ended, Erdelatz applied for the head coaching job with Army and the NFL's St. Louis Cardinals but came up empty. He announced his retirement from football on May 9, 1962, and said he would work as an executive with a California financial company.

== Death ==
On October 27, 1966, shortly after he had undergone a routine physical, Erdelatz had surgery to remove a malignant tumor from his stomach. His cancer spread and caused his death two weeks later. His funeral was attended by more than three hundred people.

== Head coaching record ==
=== College ===
Year	Team	Overall	Conference	Standing	Bowl/playoffs	Coaches^{#}	AP^{°}
Navy Midshipmen (Independent) (1950–1958)
1950	Navy	3–6				19	
1951	Navy	2–6–1					
1952	Navy	6–2–1				17	
1953	Navy	4–3–2					
1954	Navy	8–2			W Sugar Bowl	5	5
1955	Navy	6–2–1				20	18
1956	Navy	6–1–2				19	16
1957	Navy	9–1–1			W Cotton Bowl	6	5
1958	Navy	6–3					
Navy:		50–26–8					
Total:		50–26–8					
^{#}Rankings from final Coaches Poll.; ^{°}Rankings from final AP Poll.

=== AFL ===
Team	Year	Regular season					Postseason			
Team	Year	Won	Lost	Ties	Win %	Finish	Won	Lost	Win %	Result
OAK	1960	6	8	0	.429	3rd in AFL Western	-	-	-	-
OAK	1961	0	2	0	.000	4th in AFL Western	-	-	-	-
Total		6	10	0	.375					-

== See also ==
- American Football League players, coaches and owners
