= 1957 Rice Owls football team =

American college football season

1957 Rice Owls football

SWC champion

Cotton Bowl Classic, L 7–20 vs. Navy
- Conference: Southwest Conference

Ranking
- Coaches: No. 7
- AP: No. 8
- Record: 7–4 (5–1 SWC)
- Head coach: Jess Neely (18th season)
- Home stadium: Rice Stadium

1957 Southwest Conference football standings
	Conf.					Overall
Team	W		L		T	W		L		T
No. 8 Rice $	5	–	1	–	0	7	–	4	–	0
No. 11 Texas	4	–	1	–	1	6	–	4	–	1
No. 9 Texas A&M	4	–	2	–	0	8	–	3	–	0
SMU	3	–	3	–	0	4	–	5	–	1
Arkansas	2	–	4	–	0	6	–	4	–	0
TCU	2	–	4	–	0	5	–	4	–	1
Baylor	0	–	5	–	1	3	–	6	–	1
$ – Conference champion; Rankings from AP Poll

The 1957 Rice Owls football team represented Rice Institute during the 1957 college football season. The Owls were led by 18th-year head coach Jess Neely and played their home games at Rice Stadium in Houston, Texas. They competed as members of the Southwest Conference, winning the conference with a conference record of 5–1. After two consecutive losing seasons in 1955 and 1956, Rice bounced back to finish the 1957 regular season with a record of 7–3. They won the last four games of the regular season, including a victory over the undefeated and number one-ranked Texas A&M Aggies, coached by Bear Bryant. The Owls were ranked eighth in the final AP Poll and seventh in the final Coaches Poll, which were conducted before bowl season. Rice was invited to the 1958 Cotton Bowl Classic, held on New Year's Day, where they were defeated by fifth-ranked Navy.

The season-opening victory vs. 1957 is the Owls' most recent at Tiger Stadium. Rice is 0–14–1 in Baton Rouge, Louisiana since.

== Schedule ==
Date	Opponent	Rank	Site	Result	Attendance	Source
September 21	at LSU*		Tiger Stadium; Baton Rouge, LA	W 20–14	50,912	
October 5	No. 17 Stanford*		Rice Stadium; Houston, TX	W 34–7	54,000	
October 12	No. 5 Duke*	No. 15	Rice Stadium; Houston, TX	L 6–7	52,000	
October 19	at SMU	No. 19	Cotton Bowl; Dallas, TX (rivalry)	W 27–21	36,000	
October 26	at No. 19 Texas	No. 13	Memorial Stadium; Austin, TX (rivalry)	L 14–19	48,000	
November 2	Clemson*		Rice Stadium; Houston, TX	L 7–20		
November 9	No. 12 Arkansas		Rice Stadium; Houston, TX	W 13–7	40,000	
November 16	No. 1 Texas A&M	No. 20	Rice Stadium; Houston, TX	W 7–6	72,000	
November 23	at TCU	No. 13	Amon G. Carter Stadium; Fort Worth, TX	W 20–0	20,000	
November 30	Baylor	No. 9	Rice Stadium; Houston, TX	W 20–0	43,000	
January 1	vs. No. 5 Navy*	No. 8	Cotton Bowl; Dallas, TX (Cotton Bowl Classic)	L 7–20	75,504	
*Non-conference game; Rankings from AP Poll released prior to the game
