= 1957 Navy Midshipmen football team =

American college football season

1957 Navy Midshipmen football

Eastern champion Cotton Bowl champion

Cotton Bowl Classic, W 20–7 vs. Rice
- Conference: Independent

Ranking
- Coaches: No. 6
- AP: No. 5
- Record: 9–1–1
- Head coach: Eddie Erdelatz (8th season)
- Captain: Ned Oldham
- Home stadium: Thompson Stadium

1957 Southern major college football independents records
	Conf.			Overall
Team	W	L	T	W		L		T
No. 5 Navy		–		9	–	1	–	1
Oklahoma State		–		6	–	3	–	1
Miami (FL)		–		5	–	4	–	1
Florida State		–		4	–	6	–	0
Texas Tech		–		2	–	8	–	0
Rankings from AP poll

The 1957 Navy Midshipmen football team represented the United States Naval Academy (USNA) as an independent during the 1957 college football season. Led by eighth-year head coach Eddie Erdelatz, the Midshipmen shut out No. 10 Army, 14–0, to end the regular season at 8–1–1; they were ranked fifth in the final polls, released in early December.

In December, Navy won its third Lambert Trophy, an award for the season's best college football team in the East. The Middies had previously won the award in 1943 and 1954. Navy and the small-college winner of the Lambert Cup, Lehigh, were lauded as proof that a university could field a competitive football team without compromising its academic standards.

Favored by a point, Navy won the Cotton Bowl 20–7 over eighth-ranked Rice on New Year's Day.

== Schedule ==
Date	Time	Opponent	Rank	Site	TV	Result	Attendance	Source
September 21		at Boston College	No. 12	Alumni Stadium; Chestnut Hill, MA		W 46–6	28,000	
September 28		William & Mary^{†}	No. 5	Thompson Stadium; Annapolis, MD		W 33–6	15,000	
October 5		at North Carolina	No. 6	Kenan Memorial Stadium; Chapel Hill, NC		L 7–13	25,000	
October 12		at California		California Memorial Stadium; Berkeley, CA		W 21–6	47,000	
October 19		vs. Georgia	No. 15	Foreman Field; Norfolk, VA (Oyster Bowl)		W 27–14	31,160	
October 26		at Penn	No. 16	Franklin Field; Philadelphia, PA		W 35–7	26,495	
November 2		at No. 5 Notre Dame	No. 16	Notre Dame Stadium; Notre Dame, IN (rivalry)		W 20–6	58,922	
November 9		vs. No. 16 Duke	No. 7	Memorial Stadium; Baltimore, MD	NBC	T 6–6	31,000	
November 16		vs. George Washington	No. 9	Memorial Stadium; Baltimore, MD		W 52–0	10,000	
November 30	1:15 p.m.	vs. No. 10 Army	No. 8	Philadelphia Municipal Stadium; Philadelphia, PA (Army–Navy Game)	NBC	W 14–0	100,000–101,000	
January 1, 1958		vs. No. 8 Rice	No. 5	Cotton Bowl; Dallas, TX (Cotton Bowl)	CBS	W 20–7	75,504	
^{†}Homecoming; Rankings from AP Poll released prior to the game; All times are in Eastern time; Source:

== Roster ==
1957 Navy Midshipmen football team roster
Players
Coaches
Offense

Pos.	#	Name	Class
HB	49	Roland Brandquist	So
HB	48	Ronnie Brence	Sr
QB	18	Tom Forrestal	Sr
HB	34	Harry Hurst	Sr
HB	27	Ned Oldham (C)	Sr
E	89	John Ruth	Sr
G	61	Tony Stremic	Sr
FB	21	Al Swanson	Sr
QB	16	Joe Tranchini	So
FB	33	Ray Wellborn	Jr
C	56	John Witzmann	Sr

Defense

Pos.	#	Name	Class

Special teams

Pos.	#	Name	Class
PK	27	Ned Oldham	Sr

Head coach

- Eddie Erdelatz (8th year)

Coordinators/assistant coaches

- Steve Belichick
- Wayne Hardin
- Ernie Jorge

Legend

- (C) Team captain
- (S) Suspended
- (I) Ineligible
- Injured
- Redshirt
