= 1956 Big Ten Conference football season =

- Sport: American football
- Teams: 10
- Top draft pick: Ron Kramer
- Champion: Iowa
- Runners-up: Michigan
- Season MVP: Ken Ploen

Football seasons
- ← 1955 1957 →

1956 Big Ten Conference football standings
	Conf.					Overall
Team	W		L		T	W		L		T
No. 3 Iowa $	5	–	1	–	0	9	–	1	–	0
No. 7 Michigan	5	–	2	–	0	7	–	2	–	0
No. 12 Minnesota	4	–	1	–	2	6	–	1	–	2
No. 9 Michigan State	4	–	2	–	0	7	–	2	–	0
No. 15 Ohio State	4	–	2	–	0	6	–	3	–	0
Northwestern	3	–	3	–	1	4	–	4	–	1
Purdue	1	–	4	–	2	3	–	4	–	2
Illinois	1	–	4	–	2	2	–	5	–	2
Wisconsin	0	–	4	–	3	1	–	5	–	3
Indiana	1	–	5	–	0	3	–	6	–	0
$ – Conference champion; Rankings from AP Poll

The 1956 Big Ten Conference football season was the 61st season of college football played by the member schools of the Big Ten Conference (also known as the Western Conference) and was a part of the 1956 college football season.

The 1956 Iowa Hawkeyes football team, under head coach Forest Evashevski, won the Big Ten championship, compiled a 9–1 record, led the Big Ten in scoring defense (8.4 points allowed per game), was ranked No. 3 in the final AP Poll and in the Coaches Poll, and defeated Oregon State, 35–19, in the 1957 Rose Bowl. Quarterback Ken Ploen received the Chicago Tribune Silver Football trophy as the most valuable player in the Big Ten and was also named the most valuable player in the Rose Bowl.

The 1956 Michigan Wolverines football team, under head coach Bennie Oosterbaan, compiled a 7–2 record, handed Iowa its only defeat, and was ranked No. 7 in the final AP Poll and the Coaches Poll. End Ron Kramer was a consensus first-team All-American and was the first Big Ten player selected, with the fourth overall pick, in the 1957 NFL draft. Guard Dick Hill was selected as the team's most valuable player.

The 1956 Michigan State Spartans football team, under head coach Duffy Daugherty, compiled a 7–2 record, was ranked No. 9 in the final AP Poll, and led the Big Ten in scoring offense with an average of 26.6 points scored per game. James Hinsley was selected as the team's most valuable player.

In the final AP Poll, five Big Ten teams finished in the top 15: Iowa (#1); Michigan (#7); Michigan State (#9); Minnesota (#12); and Ohio State (#15). The conference's individual statistical leaders included Purdue quarterback Len Dawson with 856 passing yards, Purdue halfback Melvin Dillard with 873 rushing yards, and Indiana end Brad Bomba with 407 receiving yards. Ohio State guard Jim Parker won the Outland Trophy as the best interior lineman in college football.

== Season overview ==
=== Results and team statistics ===
Conf. Rank	Team	Head coach	AP final	AP high	Overall record	Conf. record	PPG	PAG	MVP
1	Iowa	Forest Evashevski	#3	#3	9–1	5–1	21.9	**8.4**	**Ken Ploen**
2	Michigan	Bennie Oosterbaan	#7	#5	7–2	5–2	25.9	13.7	Dick Hill
3	Minnesota	Murray Warmath	#12	#6	6–1–2	4–1–2	14.1	9.7	Bobby Cox
4 (tie)	Michigan State	Duffy Daugherty	#9	#1	7–2	4–2	**26.6**	9.7	James Hinsley
4 (tie)	Ohio State	Woody Hayes	#15	#4	6–3	4–2	17.8	9.0	Jim Parker
6	Northwestern	Ara Parseghian	NR	NR	4–4–1	3–3–1	11.9	12.4	Al Viola
7 (tie)	Purdue	Jack Mollenkopf	NR	#17	3–4–2	1–4–2	15.4	13.6	Lamar Lundy
7 (tie)	Illinois	Ray Eliot	NR	#13	2–5–2	1–4–2	13.8	17.1	Dave Walker
9	Wisconsin	Milt Bruhn	NR	NR	1–5–3	0–4–3	10.3	14.3	Dave Howard
10	Indiana	Bernie Crimmins	NR	NR	3–6	1–5	14.3	29.2	Bob Fee

Key
AP final = Team's rank in the final AP Poll of the 1956 season
AP high = Team's highest rank in the AP Poll throughout the 1956 season
PPG = Average of points scored per game
PAG = Average of points allowed per game
MVP = Most valuable player as voted by players on each team as part of the voting process to determine the winner of the Chicago Tribune Silver Football trophy; trophy winner in bold

=== Preseason ===
Between the 1955 and 1956 seasons, three Big Ten teams changed head coaches as follows:

- On December 9, 1955, Purdue head coach Stu Holcomb resigned his position and signed a five-year contract as the athletic director at Northwestern. Four days later, Purdue president Frederick L. Hovde announced that Holcomb's top assistant, Jack Mollenkopf, had been signed to a three-year contract as Purdue's head football coach.
- On December 12, 1955, Stu Holcomb, in his new position as Northwestern's athletic director, fired head coach Lou Saban and his entire staff of assistant coaches. Four days later, Holcomb announced that he had signed Miami (OH) head coach Ara Parseghian to a three-year contract as the Wildcats' new head coach. Parseghian had led the 1955 Miami Redskins football team to a perfect 9–0 record.
- Also in December 1955, Wisconsin head coach Ivy Williamson was promoted to athletic director. He appointed Milt Bruhn as the school's new head football coach. Bruhn had been a lineman on Minnesota's undefeated 1934 and 1935 national championship teams and had been Wisconsin's line coach since 1949.

In the final AP Poll of the 1955 season, Michigan State had been ranked No. 2 and Ohio State No. 5. In the pre-season AP Poll, four Big Ten teams were ranked in the top 20: Michigan State (#2); Ohio State (#5); Michigan (#8); and Illinois (#20).

In the spring of 1956, the Big Ten conducted an investigation into allegations that Ohio State coach Woody Hayes had provided financial assistance to players in violation of conference rule. Hayes admitted that he had loaned money to players but refused to provide an accounting of the loans. The investigation also discovered a "serious irregularity" in Ohio State's off-campus work program. In April 1956, the conference placed Ohio State on probation for one year and declared the football team ineligible to play in the 1957 Rose Bowl.

In May 1956, the Big Ten sold television rights for five Big Ten football games during the 1956 season to NBC for an estimated sum of $450,000.

In August 1956, Look magazine published an investigative piece alleging that Big Ten schools, including Michigan and Minnesota, were finding ways to evade the conference's rules on aid to football players.

=== Regular season ===
==== September 29 ====
On September 29, 1956, the Big Ten football games opened the season with one conference game and eight non-conference games. The non-conference games resulted in eight wins and no losses.

- Michigan State 21, Stanford 7. Michigan State (ranked No. 3 in the AP Poll) defeated Stanford (ranked No. 12), 21–7, before a crowd of 55,000 at Stanford Stadium in Stanford, California. The game was tied at the end of the third quarter, and Michigan State scored two touchdowns in the fourth quarter. Dennis Mendyk rushed for 72 yards on 14 carries.
- Ohio State 34, Nebraska 7. Ohio State (ranked No. 8 in the AP Poll) defeated Nebraska, 34–7, before a crowd of 82,153 at Ohio Stadium in Columbus, Ohio. The crowd was the largest for an opening game in Ohio State history to that point. The Buckeyes rushed for 416 yards in the game. Ohio halfback Don Clark scored two touchdowns on runs of 35 and 38 yards.
- Michigan 42, UCLA 13. Michigan (ranked No. 13 in the AP Poll) defeated UCLA, 42–13, before a crowd of 67,739 at Michigan Stadium in Ann Arbor, Michigan. Michigan took a 28–0 lead at halftime. The loss was the worst suffered by UCLA since 1950. Fullback John Herrnstein and halfback Bob Ptacek made their debuts for Michigan. Herrnstein scored two rushing touchdowns, and Ptacek threw a touchdown pass to Jim Van Pelt. Ron Kramer also scored on a 70-yard touchdown pass from Terry Barr.
- Iowa 27, Indiana 0. Iowa defeated Indiana, 27–0, before a crowd of 25,000 at Memorial Stadium in Bloomington, Indiana, for the first conference game of the 1956 season. Iowa scored two touchdowns in the first quarter off an Indiana fumble and an interception. Iowa rushed for 242 yards to 76 yards for Indiana.
- Minnesota 34, Washington 14. Minnesota defeated Washington, 34–14, before a crowd of 40,000 at Husky Stadium in Seattle. Quarterbacks Dick Larson and Bobby Cox led Minnesota on offense. Cox had played for Washington in 1954 threw a touchdown pass to give Minnesota the lead at halftime.
- Northwestern 14, Iowa State 13. Northwestern defeated Iowa State, 14–13, before a crowd of 38,000 at Dyche Stadium in Evanston, Illinois. With six seconds remaining in the game and Iowa State driving deep into Northwestern territory, Chuck Latting fumbled at the seven-yard line.
- Wisconsin 41, Marquette 0. Wisconsin defeated Marquette, 41–0, before a crowd of 52,700 at Camp Randall Stadium in Madison, Wisconsin. Wisconsin totaled 441 rushing yards to 43 for Marquette.
- Purdue 16, Missouri 7. Purdue defeated Missouri, 16–7, before a crowd of 46,455 at Ross–Ade Stadium in Lafayette, Indiana. Purdue halfback Tom Fletcher rushed for 154 yards, including a 35-yard touchdown run. Purdue quarterback Len Dawson completed eight of 17 passes for 118 yards.
- Illinois 32, California 20. Illinois defeated California, 32–20, before a crowd of 54,833 at Memorial Stadium in Champaign, Illinois. The attendance was a Memorial Stadium record for an opening game. California took a 20–0 lead, but Illinois scored four touchdowns in the third quarter over a span of six minutes and 36 seconds. Abe Woodson recovered Ray Nitschke's fumble for Illinois' first touchdown.

==== October 6 ====
On October 6, 1956, the Big Ten teams played two conference games and six non-conference games. The non-conference games resulted in two wins and four losses, giving the Big Ten a non-conference record of 10–4.

- Michigan State 9, Michigan 0. Michigan State (ranked No. 2 in the AP Poll) defeated Michigan (ranked No. 5), 9–0, before a crowd of 101,001 at Michigan Stadium in Ann Arbor. Michigan dominated the game in the first half but was unable to score. Michigan State was hampered by an ankle injury to its leading rusher (Walt Kowalczyk) and a passing game that failed to complete a single pass. In the third quarter, the Spartans kicked a field goal after Arch Matsos intercepted a pass at Michigan's 38-yard line. John Matsko, who had not attempted a field goal in high school or in three years of college ball, kicked the field goal. In the fourth quarter, John Herrnstein fumbled at Michigan's 21-yard line, setting up a touchdown run by Dennis Mendyk.
- Ohio State 32, Stanford 20. Ohio State (ranked No. 4 in the AP Poll) defeated Stanford, 32–20. The crowd of 82,881 was the largest to that point to see a game at Ohio Stadium. Stanford quarterback John Brodie completed 21 of 35 passes for 256 yards and two touchdowns. Ohio State gained 302 of its 320 yards on the ground. In the fourth quarter, Don Clark ran for a touchdown and threw an 18-yard touchdown pass to Jim Roseboro to break a 20–20 tie.
- Iowa 14, Oregon State 13. Iowa (ranked No. 20 in the AP Poll) defeated Oregon State, 14–13, before a crowd of 41,027 at Iowa Stadium in Iowa City. The game matched the same teams that met again in the 1957 Rose Bowl. Oregon State scored on its second play from scrimmage on a 30-yard pass, but the extra point attempt was blocked. Oregon State scored again in the third quarter on a 49-yard run by Paul Lowe and led, 13–0, at the start of the fourth quarter. Iowa threw two touchdown passes in a span of six minutes in the fourth quarter to secure the victory.
- Minnesota 21, Purdue 14. Minnesota defeated Purdue, 21–14, before a crowd of 59,314 at Memorial Stadium in Minneapolis. Fullback Dick Borstad scored two Minnesota touchdowns on runs of 23 yards and one yard. Purdue quarterback Len Dawson completed seven of 13 passes for 102 yards and three interceptions.
- Tulane 20, Northwestern 13. Tulane defeated Northwestern, 20–13, before a crowd of 32,000 at Dyche Stadium in Evanston. Tulane scored all 20 of its points in a wild second quarter. Northwestern's Bob McKelver rushed for 116 net yards on 12 carries.
- USC 13, Wisconsin 6. USC defeated Wisconsin, 13–6, before a crowd of 52,979 at Camp Randall Stadium in Madison. USC's All-American halfback Jon Arnett rushed for 182 yards on 25 carries.
- Washington 28, Illinois 13. Washington defeated Illinois, 28–13, before a crowd of 36,261 at Husky Stadium in Seattle. On the opening series of the game, Illinois drove to Washington's two yard line but quarterback Hiles Stout fumbled. Washington recovered the ball, and Dean Derby ran 92 yards for a touchdown.
- Notre Dame 20, Indiana 6. Notre Dame (ranked No. 17 in the AP Poll) defeated Indiana, 20–6, before a crowd of 58,372 at Notre Dame Stadium in South Bend, Indiana.

==== October 13 ====
On October 13, 1956, the Big Ten teams played four conference games and two non-conference games. The non-conference games resulted in two wins and no losses, giving the Big Ten a non-conference record of 12–4.

- Michigan State 53, Indiana 6. Michigan State (ranked No. 2 in the AP Poll) defeated Indiana, 53–6, before a crowd of 58,858 at Macklin Stadium in East Lansing, Michigan. The Spartans gained 264 rushing yards and 204 passing yards. Clarence Peaks also returned a punt 63 yards for a touchdown. Michigan State played backups for much of the second half with a total of 50 Spartans seeing game action. The outcome was Indiana's worst defeat since 1948.
- Ohio State 26, Illinois 6. Ohio State (ranked No. 5 at the AP Poll) defeated Illinois, 26–6, before a crowd of 58,247 at Memorial Stadium in Champaign. Ohio State rushed for 307 yards, aided by the blocking of guard Jim Parker who was selected as the team's most valuable player for the 1956 season. Parker also played on defense and recovered a fumble at the Illinois 10-yard line to set up a touchdown. Quarterback Frank Ellwood rushed for two touchdowns and threw a touchdown pass to Jim Roseboro.
- Michigan 48, Army 14. Michigan (ranked No. 12 in the AP Poll) defeated Army (ranked No. 15), 48–14, before a crowd of 93,101 at Michigan Stadium in Ann Arbor. Michigan led, 48–0, after three quarters and played substitutes through most of the second half, with a total of 49 players seeing game action. Army fumbled eight times in the game. Seven different Michigan players scored touchdowns.
- Minnesota 0, Northwestern 0. Minnesota (ranked No. 17 in the AP Poll) and Northwestern played to a scoreless tie in front of a crowd of 62,006 at Memorial Stadium in Minneapolis. Minnesota had been a 14-point favorite and moved the ball well, out-gaining Northwestern 271 yards to 142. However, the Gophers were unable to score, turning the ball over on fumbles three times, including one at Northwestern's goal line. Heavy rain slowed the teams in the second half.
- Purdue 28, Notre Dame 14. Purdue defeated Notre Dame (ranked No. 18 in the AP Poll), 28–14, before a crowd of 58,778 at Notre Dame Stadium in South Bend. Purdue back Mel Dillard rushed for 142 yards and two touchdowns on 29 carries.
- Iowa 13, Wisconsin 7. Iowa defeated Wisconsin, 13–7, before a crowd of 53,273 at Iowa Stadium. With only a minute remaining in the first half, Iowa drove 84 yards, running eight plays in 59 seconds and scoring on a pitchout from Ken Ploen to Mike Hagler. Iowa scored again on the first drive of the second half on a short run by Ploen, taking a 13–0 lead.

==== October 20 ====
On October 20, 1956, the Big Ten teams played three conference games and four non-conference games. The non-conference games resulted in three wins and one loss, giving the Big Ten a non-conference record of 15–5.

- Michigan State 47, Notre Dame 14. Michigan State (ranked No. 2 in the AP Poll) defeated Notre Dame, 47–14, before a crowd of 59,378 at Notre Dame Stadium in South Bend. Michigan State gained 521 yards, 396 on the ground and 171 in the air. Dennis Mendyk led the Spartans attack with 157 rushing yards, including touchdown runs of 62 and 68 yards in the third quarter. After the game, Michigan State rose to No. 1 in the following week's AP and UPI polls.
- Penn State 7, Ohio State 6. Penn State defeated Ohio State (ranked No. 5 in the AP Poll), 7–6, before a crowd of 82,584 at Ohio Stadium in Columbus. Neither team scored through the first three quarters. Penn State's Bruce Gilmore scored on a short run in the fourth quarter, and Milt Plum kicked the extra point. Later in the quarter, Don Clark scored for Ohio State on a short touchdown run, but Frank Kremblas' kick for extra point went wide of the goalpost.
- Michigan 34, Northwestern 20. Michigan (ranked No. 8 in the AP Poll) defeated Northwestern, 34–20, before a Band Day crowd of 81,227 at Michigan Stadium in Ann Arbor. Fullback John Herrnstein scored three touchdowns for Michigan.
- Iowa 34, Hawaii 0. Iowa defeated Hawaii, 34–0, at Iowa Stadium in Iowa City. Iowa led, 14–0, at halftime and played second, third and fourth-string players in the second half, with a total of 42 Hawkeyes seeing game action. Iowa rushed for 266 yards and held Hawaii to 67 rushing yards.
- Minnesota 16, Illinois 13. Minnesota defeated Illinois, 16–13, before a crowd of 63,037 at Memorial Stadium in Minneapolis. Dick Borstad kicked a field goal with two minutes remaining to put the Golden Gophers in the lead.
- Purdue 6, Wisconsin 6. Purdue and Wisconsin played to a 6–6 tie before a Dad's Day crowd of 53,094 at Camp Randall Stadium in Madison. Danny Lewis ran 30 yards for a Wisconsin touchdown in the first quarter, and Len Dawson threw a touchdown pass to Lamar Lundy in the second quarter. Neither team converted its extra point.
- Indiana 19, Nebraska 14. Indiana defeated Nebraska, 19–14, before a crowd of 38,000 at Memorial Stadium in Lincoln, Nebraska. Nebraska led, 14–0, at halftime, but Indiana rallied for two touchdowns in the fourth quarter. The result was Indiana's first win of the season. Brad Bomba caught six passes in the game.

==== October 27 ====
On October 27, 1956, the Big Ten teams played five conference games.

- Illinois 20, Michigan State 13. Illinois defeated Michigan State, 20–13, before a homecoming crowd of 71,119 at Memorial Stadium in Champaign. Michigan State was ranked No. 1 before the game and had its national championship hopes, and a 12-game winning streak, dashed by the defeat. The Spartans led, 13–0, at halftime, but Abe Woodson, the Big Ten's indoor sprint champion, led the Illini to 20 unanswered points in the second half. Woodson scored all three Illinois touchdowns: a 70-yard touchdown run, an 82-touchdown reception, and a short touchdown run. Woodson had 116 rushing yards and total gains of 198 yards.
- Minnesota 20, Michigan 7. in the annual battle for the Little Brown Jug, Minnesota defeated Michigan (ranked No. 5 in the AP Poll), 20–7, before a crowd of 84,639 at Michigan Stadium. Michigan led, 7–0, at halftime on 16-yard touchdown run by Terry Barr, but Barr was injured on the touchdown and did not return to the game. Minnesota came back in the second half with 20 unanswered points, including two touchdown runs by Bobby Cox.
- Iowa 21, Purdue 20. Iowa (ranked No. 12 in the AP Poll) defeated Purdue, 21–20, before a crowd of 41,415 at Ross–Ade Stadium in West Lafayette. Purdue quarterback Len Dawson threw two touchdown passes, and Mel Dillard ran for a third. Iowa also scored three touchdowns, with the difference being a missed extra point. Purdue drove into Iowa territory late in the game, but Purdue fumbled at the 25-yard line with a minute and a half remaining in the game.
- Indiana 19, Northwestern 13. Indiana defeated Northwestern, 19–13, before a homecoming crowd of 23,000 at Memorial Stadium in Bloomington. The game was tied, 13–13, at halftime. Indiana intercepted a Northwestern pass with four minutes remaining to set up the winning touchdown.
- Ohio State 21, Wisconsin 0. Ohio State defeated Wisconsin, 21–0, before a crowd of 82,661 at Ohio Stadium in Columbus. The victory was Ohio State's 16th in a row against a Big Ten opponent, tying a conference opponent.

==== November 3 ====
On November 3, 1956, the Big Ten teams played four conference games and two non-conference games. The non-conference games resulted in two wins and no losses, giving the Big Ten a non-conference record of 17–5.

- Michigan 17, Iowa 14. Michigan (ranked No. 17 in the AP Poll) defeated Iowa (ranked No. 7 in the AP Poll) by a 17–14 score before a crowd of 58,137 at Iowa Stadium in Iowa City. The loss was the only one of the year for Iowa. Iowa had not beaten Michigan since 1924. Michigan took a 3–0 lead in the first quarter on a field goal by Ron Kramer. Iowa then scored two touchdowns and led, 14–3, at halftime. One of the Iowa touchdowns was set up when Michigan quarterback was sacked and fumbled with Alex Karras recovering the ball for Iowa. Michigan's third-string halfback, Mike Shatusky, scored two touchdowns in the second half, a three-yard run in the third quarter and a two-yard plunge with one minute and six seconds remaining in the game.
- Minnesota 9, Pittsburgh 6. Minnesota (ranked No. 8 in the AP Poll) defeated Pittsburgh, 9–6, before a homecoming crowd of 63,158 at Memorial Stadium in Minneapolis. Minnesota's Dick Borstad kicked a field goal with two-and-a-half minutes to go to give Minnesota the lead. Pitt's Joe Walton returned the ensuing kickoff for a touchdown, but the return was called back due to a clipping penalty.
- Michigan State 33, Wisconsin 0. Michigan State (ranked No. 4 in the AP Poll) defeated Wisconsin, 33–0, before a crowd of 53,647 at Macklin Stadium in East Lansing. Michigan State totaled 352 rushing yards and 168 passing yards. The result was Wisconsin's worst defeat since 1949.
- Ohio State 6, Northwestern 2. Ohio State (ranked No. 6 in the AP Poll) defeated Northwestern, 6–2, before a homecoming crowd of 42,000 at Dyche Stadium in Evanston. Northwestern guard Al Viola blocked a punt in the first quarter that rolled out of the end zone for a safety. With 16 seconds left in the first half, Ellwood threw a seven-yard touchdown pass to Leo Brown.
- Illinois 7, Purdue 7. Illinois and Purdue played to a 7–7 tie before a homecoming crowd of 46,166 at Ross–Ade Stadium in West Lafayette.
- Indiana 19, Marquette 13. Indiana defeated Marquette, 19–13, before a crowd of approximately 21,000 at Memorial Stadium in Bloomington. In the fourth quarter, Indiana's Arnold Steeves recovered a fumble at Marquette's 43-yard line to set up the winning touchdown.

==== November 10 ====
On November 10, 1956, the Big Ten teams played five conference games.

- Iowa 7, Minnesota 0. Iowa (ranked No. 15 in the AP Poll) defeated Minnesota (ranked No. 6), 7–0, before a crowd of 64,235 at Memorial Stadium in Minneapolis. Iowa coach implemented a 6-3-2 defense to contain Minnesota's speedy Bobby Cox. After the game, Cox noted: "I couldn't go outside. They forced me to go inside and then some linebacker would nail me." The outcome put Iowa into the lead in the race for the conference's Rose Bowl bid. After the game, Iowa's players carried coach Evashevski off the field on their shoulders.
- Michigan 17, Illinois 7. Michigan (ranked No. 10 in the AP Poll) defeated Illinois, 17–7, before a crowd of 75,470 at Michigan Stadium. Illinois scored a touchdown on its first possession but was held scoreless for the remainder of the game. Michigan came back with rushing touchdowns by Jim Pace and Jim Byers and a field goal by Ron Kramer. Michigan rushed for 328 yards, including 120 yards by Jim Pace.
- Michigan State 12, Purdue 9. Michigan State (ranked No. 4 in the AP Poll) defeated Purdue, 12–9, before a crowd of 56,431 at Macklin Stadium in East Lansing. Purdue was a three touchdown underdog without Len Dawson but scored on a touchdown run by Mel Dillard and a safety triggered by Fletcher tackling Martin in the end zone. Michigan State scored two touchdowns, a 27-yard pass from Jim Ninowski to Harold Dukes, and a fumble recovery by Tony Kolodziej in Purdue's end zone.
- Ohio State 35, Indiana 14. Ohio State (ranked No. 7 in the AP Poll) defeated Indiana, 35–14, before a crowd of 82,073 at Ohio Stadium in Columbus. The victory was Ohio State's 17th in a row against conference opponents, setting a new conference record. The Buckeyes also broke the Big Ten single-game record with 465 rushing yards against the Hoosiers.
- Northwestern 17, Wisconsin 7. Northwestern defeated Wisconsin, 17–7, before a homecoming crowd of 54,645 spectators at Camp Randall Stadium in Madison. The attendance was the highest in the history of Camp Randall Stadium to that point. Northwestern's first touchdown of the game was scored by center Ted Ringer when he recovered a loose ball in the end zone following a fumble by teammate Wilmer Fowler. The outcome was Northwestern's first conference victory under Ara Parseghian.

==== November 17 ====
On November 17, 1956, the Big Ten teams played five conference games.

- Iowa 6, Ohio State 0. Iowa (ranked No. 7 in the AP Poll) defeated Ohio State (ranked No. 6), 6–0, before a crowd of 57,732 at Iowa Stadium. Ohio State went into the game with the second best rushing attack in the country but were held to 147 rushing yards, their lowest rushing yardage total in two years. The result broke Ohio State's winning streak of 17 games against conference opponents and clinched for Iowa the conference championship and a berth in the Rose Bowl. After time expired, Iowa fans hauled down the goal posts and paraded through Iowa City.
- Michigan 49, Indiana 26. Michigan defeated Indiana, 49–26, before a crowd of 58,515 at Michigan Stadium in Ann Arbor. Michigan led, 35–0, at halftime and gained for 427 yards (275 rushing, 142 passing) in the game. Michigan's Terry Barr scored three touchdowns in the game. Despite the victory, Iowa's victory over Ohio eliminated Michigan from contention for a berth in the Rose Bowl.
- Minnesota 14, Michigan State 13. Minnesota (ranked No. 17 in the AP Poll) defeated Michigan State (ranked No. 3), 14–13, before a crowd of 62,478 at Memorial Stadium in Minneapolis. Bobby Cox led the way for Minnesota
- Illinois 13, Wisconsin 13. Illinois and Wisconsin played to a 13–13 tie before a crowd of 52,858 at Memorial Stadium in Champaign. Illinois led 13–6 at halftime. With slightly more than three minutes left in the game, Wisconsin end Sidney Williams threw a 34-yard pass to Danny Lewis on the nine-yard line, setting up a touchdown run on the next play. Williams' pass was his first of the season.
- Northwestern 14, Purdue 0. Northwestern defeated Purdue, 14–0, before a crowd of 32,000 at Dyche Stadium in Evanston. Northwestern recovered five of seven Purdue fumbles and intercepted three passes. Four of the fumbles were recovered by Al Viola. After the game, Edward Prell wrote in the Chicago Tribune that Northwestern had in 1956 been "brought back to life by its new 33 year old coach, Ara Parseghian."

==== November 24 ====
On November 24, 1956, the Big Ten teams played four conference games and two non-conference games. The non-conference games resulted in two wins and no losses, giving the Big Ten a non-conference record of 19–5.

- Iowa 48, Notre Dame 8. Iowa (ranked No. 3) defeated Notre Dame, 48–8, before a crowd of 56,632 at Iowa Stadium. The victory, combined with Ohio State's loss, gave Iowa its first undisputed Big Ten championship since 1932. Iowa's 48 points was the fourth highest total allowed by a Notre Dame football team to that point in the program's history. Paul Hornung sprained a thumb 10 minutes into the game and did not return. Iowa rushed for 409 yards and scored on runs of 10 and 41 yards by Ken Ploen, 23 and 61 yards by Fred Harris, and 54 yards by Mike Hagler.
- Michigan 19, Ohio State 0. In the annual Michigan–Ohio State football rivalry game, Michigan (ranked No. 9 in the AP Poll) defeated Ohio State (ranked No. 12), 19–0, before a crowd of 82,223 at Ohio Stadium. The loss deprived Ohio State of a share of its third consecutive Big Ten title and pushed Michigan to second in the conference standing. Terry Barr, playing in his last game for Michigan, scored two touchdowns.
- Minnesota 13, Wisconsin 13. In the annual battle for Paul Bunyan's Axe, Minnesota (ranked No. 7 in the AP Poll) and Wisconsin played to a 13–13 tie before a crowd of 54,149 at Camp Randall Stadium in Madison. On the final play of the game, Wisconsin's Jon Hobbs missed his third field goal attempt of the game. Wisconsin finished the season without a conference win for the first time since 1939.
- Michigan State 38, Kansas State 17. Michigan State (ranked No. 10 in the AP Poll) defeated Kansas State, 38–17, before a crowd of 34,115 at Macklin Stadium in East Lansing. Michigan State set a modern school record with 12 fumbles in the game. Despite the victory, Hal Middlesworth of the Detroit Free Press wrote: "But down on the frozen turf of Macklin Stadium, it was a fumbling, bumbling performance which will find no place among State's galaxy of great games."
- Northwestern 14, Illinois 13. In the annual Illinois–Northwestern football rivalry game, Northwestern defeated Illinois, 14–13, before a crowd of 40,000 at Dyche Stadium in Evanston. Bob McKelver kicked two extra points for Northwestern, which proved to be the difference in a game in which each team scored two touchdowns.
- Purdue 39, Indiana 20. In the annual battle for the Old Oaken Bucket, Purdue defeated Indiana, 39–20, at Ross–Ade Stadium in Lafayette, Indiana. In his final college game, Purdue quarterback Len Dawson threw two touchdown passes, both caught by end Lamar Lundy. Mel Dillard rushed for 130 yards and three touchdowns in the game and a conference high 873 yards for the season. The game proved to be a battle for last place in the conference, with Purdue finishing in ninth place and Indiana in tenth and last place.

=== Bowl games ===
On January 1, 1957, Iowa defeated Oregon State, 35–19, in the 1957 Rose Bowl. Iowa scored five touchdowns, including a 49-yard touchdown run by Ken Ploen and a 66-yard touchdown run by Collins Hagler.

=== Post-season developments ===
On November 28, 1956, Bernie Crimmins, at age 37, resigned as Indiana's head football coach. He had compiled a 13–32 record and was unable to produce a winning team in five years in the position.

On December 3, 1956, both the Associated Press (AP) and United Press (UP) released their final college football polls. Both organizations ranked undefeated Oklahoma at the No. 1 spot. The AP ranked five Big Ten teams among the top 20: Iowa (#3); Michigan (#7); Michigan State (#9); Minnesota (#12); and Ohio State (#15). The UP ranked four teams among the top 20: Iowa (#3); Michigan (#7); Minnesota (#9); and Michigan State (#10).

== Statistical leaders ==
The Big Ten's individual statistical leaders include the following:

=== Passing yards ===
1. Len Dawson, Purdue (856)
2. Pat Wilson, Michigan State (414)
3. Steve Filipowski, Indiana (391)
4. Ken Ploen, Iowa (386)
5. Hiles Stout, Illinois (278)

=== Rushing yards ===
1. Melvin Dillard, Purdue (873)
2. Don Clark, Ohio State (797)
3. James Roseboro, Ohio State (712)
4. Bob Fee, Indiana (621)
5. Abe Woodson, Illinois (599)

=== Receiving yards ===
1. Brad Bomba, Indiana (407)
2. Ron Kramer, Michigan (353)
3. Abe Woodson, Illinois (257)
4. Jim Gibbons, Iowa (255)
5. Lamar Lundy, Purdue (248)

=== Total yards ===
1. Melvin Dillard, Purdue (902)
2. Don Clark, Ohio State (885)
3. Len Dawson, Purdue (879)
4. Ken Ploen, Iowa (873)
5. Bobby Cox, Minnesota (793)

=== Point scored ===
1. Terry Barr, Michigan (42)
1. Don Clark, Ohio State (42)
1. John Herrnstein, Michigan (42)
1. Dennis Mendyk, Michigan State (42)
1. James Roseboro, Ohio State (42)

== Awards and honors ==
=== All-Big Ten honors ===
The following players were picked by the Associated Press (AP) and/or the United Press (UP) as first-team players on the 1956 All-Big Ten Conference football team.

Position	Name	Team	Selectors
Quarterback	Ken Ploen	Iowa	AP, UP
Halfback	Abe Woodson	Illinois	AP, UP
Halfback	Bob McKelver	Northwestern	AP
Halfback	Terry Barr	Michigan	UP
Fullback	Mel Dillard	Purdue	AP, UP
End	Ron Kramer	Michigan	AP, UP
End	Frank Gilliam	Iowa	AP, UP
Tackle	Bob Hobert	Minnesota	AP, UP
Tackle	Alex Karras	Iowa	AP, UP
Guard	Jim Parker	Ohio State	AP, UP
Guard	Dick Hill	Michigan	AP
Guard	Al Viola	Northwestern	UP
Center	John Matsko	Michigan State	AP
Center	Don Suchy	Iowa	UP

=== All-American honors ===
At the end of the 1956 season, Big Ten players secured two of the consensus first-team picks for the 1956 College Football All-America Team. The Big Ten's consensus All-American was:

Position	Name	Team	Selectors
End	Ron Kramer	Michigan	AFCA, AP, FWAA, INS, NEA, TSN, UP, CP, WCFF
Guard	Jim Parker	Ohio State	AFCA, AP, FWAA, INS, NEA, SN, UP, CP, WC

Other Big Ten players who were named first-team All-Americans by at least one selector were:

Position	Name	Team	Selectors
Tackle	Alex Karras	Iowa	AP, CP, FWAA
Tackle	Bob Hobert	Minnesota	FWAA

=== Other awards ===
Ohio State guard Jim Parker won the Outland Trophy as the best interior lineman in college football.

On December 4, 1956, the Heisman Trophy was awarded to Paul Hornung of Notre Dame. Three Big Ten players finished among the top 10 in the voting for the trophy. They were: Michigan end Ron Kramer (sixth), Ohio State guard Jim Parker (eighth), and Iowa quarterback Ken Ploen (ninth).

== 1957 NFL draft ==
The following Big Ten players were among the first 100 picks in the 1957 NFL draft:

Name	Position	Team	Round	Overall pick
Ron Kramer	End	Michigan	1	4
Len Dawson	Quarterback	Purdue	1	5
Clarence Peaks	Fullback	Michigan State	1	7
Jim Parker	Guard	Ohio State	1	8
Abe Woodson	Back	Illinois	2	15
Bill Michael	Tackle	Ohio State	2	16
Tom Maentz	End	Michigan	2	22
Dennis Mendyk	Back	Michigan State	3	35
Terry Barr	Wide receiver	Michigan	3	36
Bobby Cox	Quarterback	Minnesota	4	38
Lamar Lundy	End	Purdue	4	47
Milt Campbell	Back	Indiana	5	53
Wayne Bock	Tackle	Illinois	5	58
Vic Zucco	Back	Michigan State	5	60
Joe Amstutz	Center	Indiana	6	63
Bob Hobert	Tackle	Minnesota	6	73
Tom Saidock	Tackle	Michigan State	7	74
Frank Gilliam	End	Iowa	7	76
Mike Rotunno	Center	Michigan	7	82
