= 1956 Santa Barbara Gauchos football team =

American college football season

1956 Santa Barbara Gauchos football

Citricado Bowl, L 14–25 vs. San Diego Marines
- Conference: California Collegiate Athletic Association
- Record: 5–5 (2–1 CCAA)
- Head coach: Ed Cody (1st season)
- Home stadium: La Playa Stadium

1956 California Collegiate Athletic Association football standings
	Conf.					Overall
Team	W		L		T	W		L		T
Fresno State	2	–	0	–	0	8	–	2	–	0
San Diego State	2	–	1	–	0	4	–	3	–	2
Santa Barbara	2	–	1	–	0	5	–	5	–	0
Los Angeles State	1	–	1	–	0	3	–	5	–	1
Cal Poly	1	–	2	–	0	7	–	3	–	0
Long Beach State	0	–	3	–	0	3	–	5	–	0
No champion named for the 1956 season

The 1956 Santa Barbara Gauchos football team represented Santa Barbara College—now known as University of California, Santa Barbara (UCSB) as a member of the California Collegiate Athletic Association (CCAA) during the 1956 college football season. Led by first-year head coach Ed Cody, the Gauchos compiled an overall record of 5–5 with a mark of 2–1 in conference play, tying for second place in the CCAA. At the end of the regular season, the Santa Barbara accepted an invitation to play in a charity bowl game. The game was the first and only Citricado Bowl, played at Escondido High School in Escondido, California against the San Diego Marines. The Gauchos played home games at La Playa Stadium in Santa Barbara, California.

== Schedule ==
Date	Opponent	Site	Result	Attendance	Source
September 22	at Whittier*	Hadley Field; Whittier, CA	W 34–0		
September 28	Occidental*	La Playa Stadium; Santa Barbara, CA	W 31–6		
October 6	Long Beach State	La Playa Stadium; Santa Barbara, CA	W 13–6	8,000	
October 12	at Los Angeles State	Reseda High School; Reseda, CA	W 33–14		
October 20	vs. Cal Aggies (Note: The game against the Cal Aggies was part of an "All-UC Doubleheader" that was held annually from 1948 to 1963. The other game of the double-header was California vs. UCLA. The games were always held at the home stadium of either Cal or UCLA.)*	California Memorial Stadium; Berkeley, CA	L 6–14		
October 27	Pomona-Claremont*	La Playa Stadium; Santa Barbara, CA	L 14–15		
November 3	at Pepperdine*	El Camino Stadium; Torrance, CA	L 9–21		
November 10	San Diego State	La Playa Stadium; Santa Barbara, CA	L 7–30	4,000	
November 16	Sacramento State*	La Playa Stadium; Santa Barbara, CA	W 33–0		
December 1	vs. San Diego Marines (Note: The Marine Corps Recruit Depot (MCRD) in San Diego fielded a team that played against colleges and other military teams from 1922 to 1964.)*	Escondido High School; Escondido, CA (Citracado Bowl)	L 14–25		
*Non-conference game
