= 1956 Cal Aggies football team =

American college football season

1956 Cal Aggies football

FWC co-champion
- Conference: Far Western Conference
- Record: 7–3 (4–1 FWC)
- Head coach: Will Lotter (2nd season)
- Captain: Tom Parker
- Home stadium: Aggie Field

1956 Far Western Conference football standings
	Conf.					Overall
Team	W		L		T	W		L		T
Humboldt State +	4	–	1	–	0	9	–	2	–	0
Cal Aggies +	4	–	1	–	0	7	–	2	–	0
San Francisco State +	4	–	1	–	0	5	–	5	–	0
Chico State	1	–	3	–	1	2	–	6	–	1
Sacramento State	1	–	4	–	0	3	–	5	–	1
Nevada	0	–	4	–	1	0	–	7	–	1
+ – Conference co-champions

The 1956 Cal Aggies football team represented the College of Agriculture at Davis—now known as the University of California, Davis—as a member of the Far Western Conference (FWC) during the 1956 college football season. Led by Will Lotter, who for returned for his second season as head coach and helming the team in 1954, the Aggies compiled an overall record of 7–3 with a mark of 4–1 in conference play, sharing the FWC title with Humboldt State and San Francisco State. The team outscored its opponents 146 to 78 for the season. The Cal Aggies played home games at Aggie Field in Davis, California.

== Schedule ==
Date	Time	Opponent	Site	Result	Attendance	Source
September 21		Pacific (OR)*	Aggie Field; Davis, CA	W 26–0		
September 28		California JV (Note: The University of California JV team was commonly known as the "Cal Ramblers".)*	Aggie Field; Davis, CA	W 19–0		
October 6		at Nevada	Mackay Stadium (Note: This stadium is the predecessor to the current Mackay Stadium, which was opened for the 1966 season.); Reno, NV	W 27–19		
October 13	8:00 p.m.	at Sacramento State	Grant Stadium; Sacramento, CA (rivalry)	W 33–26	4,000	
October 20		vs. Santa Barbara (Note: The game against Santa Barbara was part of an "All-UC Doubleheader" that was held annually from 1948 to 1963. The other game of the double-header was California vs. UCLA. The games were always held at the home stadium of either Cal or UCLA.)*	California Memorial Stadium; Berkeley, CA	W 14–6		
October 27		Humboldt State	Aggie Field; Davis, CA	W 14–0		
November 3		San Francisco State	Aggie Field; Davis, CA	L 0–10		
November 10		at Chico State	College Field; Chico, CA	W 13–7		
November 17		at Long Beach State*	Veterans Stadium; Long Beach, CA	L 0–10	2,300	
*Non-conference game; All times are in Pacific time
