= 1956 UC Riverside Highlanders football team =

American college football season

1956 UC Riverside Highlanders football
- Conference: Independent
- Record: 1–6
- Head coach: Carl Selin (1st season)
- Home stadium: UCR Athletic Field

1956 Western non-major college football independents records
	Conf.			Overall
Team	W	L	T	W		L		T
Cal Poly San Dimas		–		6	–	2	–	0
Hawaii		–		7	–	3	–	0
Pepperdine		–		6	–	3	–	0
La Verne		–		6	–	4	–	0
UC Riverside		–		1	–	6	–	0

The 1956 UC Riverside Highlanders football team represented the University of California, Riverside as an independent during the 1956 college football season. Led by first-year head coach Carl Selin, UC Riverside compiled a record of 1–6. The team was outscored by its opponents 251 to 44 for the season. The Highlanders played home games at UCR Athletic Field in Riverside, California.

== Schedule ==
Date	Opponent	Site	Result
September 29	at Arizona State–Flagstaff	Skidmore Field; Flagstaff, AZ	L 0–60
October 6	Cal Poly JV	UCR Athletic Field; Riverside, CA	L 0–32
October 13	Whittier	?	L 0–59
October 27	at La Verne	Bonita High School?; La Verne, CA	L 6–42
November 3	California Baptist	Riverside, CA	W 38–7
November 10	Long Beach State JV	?	L 0–20
November 16	Cal Poly San Dimas	Pomona, CA	L 0–31
