= 1956 Washington State Cougars football team =

American college football season

1956 Washington State Cougars football
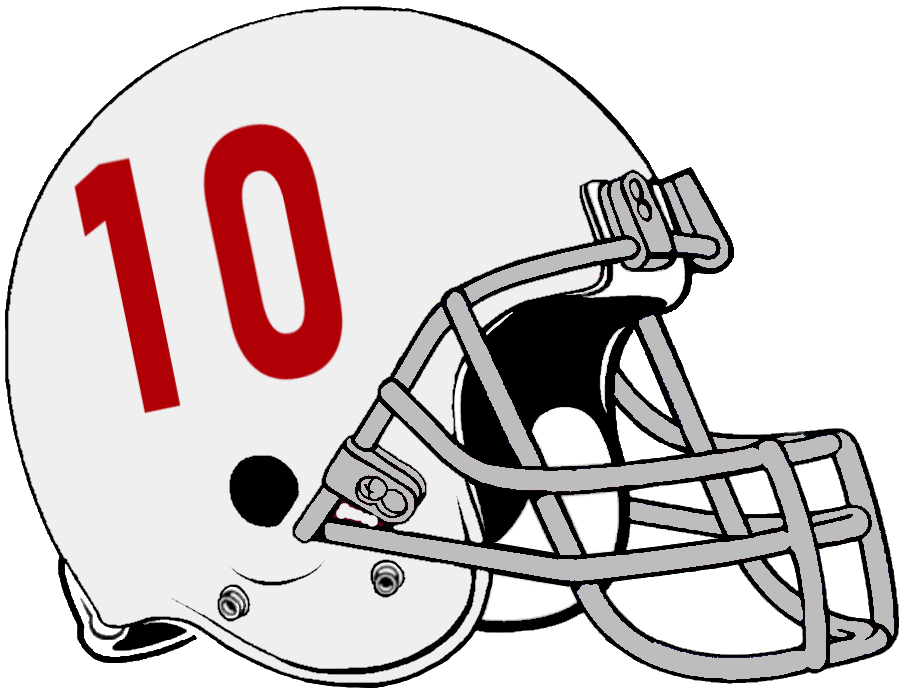
- Conference: Pacific Coast Conference
- Record: 3–6–1 (2–5–1 PCC)
- Head coach: Jim Sutherland (1st season)
- Home stadium: Rogers Field, Memorial Stadium

1956 Pacific Coast Conference football standings
	Conf.					Overall
Team	W		L		T	W		L		T
No. 10 Oregon State $	6	–	1	–	1	7	–	3	–	1
No. 18 USC	5	–	2	–	0	8	–	2	–	0
UCLA	5	–	2	–	0	7	–	3	–	0
Washington	4	–	4	–	0	5	–	5	–	0
Oregon	3	–	3	–	2	4	–	4	–	2
Stanford	3	–	4	–	0	4	–	6	–	0
Washington State	2	–	5	–	1	3	–	6	–	1
California	2	–	5	–	0	3	–	7	–	0
Idaho	0	–	4	–	0	4	–	5	–	0
$ – Conference champion; Rankings from AP Poll

The 1956 Washington State Cougars football team was an American football team that represented Washington State College during the 1956 college football season. Led by first-year head coach Jim Sutherland, the team posted a 3–6–1 overall record, and were 2–5–1 in the Pacific Coast Conference.

Sophomore end Don Ellingsen ranked second in the Pacific Coast Conference (PCC) and fifth nationally with 455 receiving yards. His average of 16.9 yards per reception was best in the PCC.

Hired in January, Sutherland was previously an assistant at rival Washington for a season under head coach John Cherberg, preceded by two years at California under Pappy Waldorf. His initial contract with the Cougars was for three years, estimated at $12,000 per year, and he led the program for eight seasons, through 1963.

== Schedule ==
Date	Opponent	Site	Result	Attendance	Source
September 22	No. 14 Stanford	Memorial Stadium; Spokane, WA	L 26–40	23,000	
September 29	San Jose State*	Rogers Field; Pullman, WA	W 33–18	9,000	
October 6	at Idaho	Neale Stadium; Moscow, ID (Battle of the Palouse)	W 33–19	16,300	
October 13	at UCLA	Los Angeles Memorial Coliseum; Los Angeles, CA	L 0–28	27,192	
October 20	Oregon State^{†}	Rogers Field; Pullman, WA	L 0–21	14,500	
October 27	at Pacific (CA)*	Pacific Memorial Stadium; Stockton, CA	L 12–33	23,500	
November 3	No. 20 USC	Rogers Field; Pullman, WA	L 12–28	13,000	
November 10	at Oregon	Hayward Field; Eugene, OR	T 7–7	13,200	
November 17	at California	California Memorial Stadium; Berkeley, CA	W 14–13	32,000	
November 24	Washington	Memorial Stadium; Spokane, WA (rivalry)	L 26–40	20,700	
*Non-conference game; ^{†}Homecoming; Rankings from AP Poll released prior to the game; Source:

== NFL draft ==
One Cougar was selected in the 1957 NFL draft, which was 30 rounds and 360 selections.

Player	Position	Round	Overall	Franchise
Don Gest	End	30	360	New York Giants
