= 1956 Sacramento State Hornets football team =

American college football season

1956 Sacramento State Hornets football
- Conference: Far Western Conference
- Record: 3–5–1 (1–4 FWC)
- Head coach: Dave Strong (3rd season)
- Home stadium: Grant Stadium

1956 Far Western Conference football standings
	Conf.					Overall
Team	W		L		T	W		L		T
Humboldt State +	4	–	1	–	0	9	–	2	–	0
Cal Aggies +	4	–	1	–	0	7	–	2	–	0
San Francisco State +	4	–	1	–	0	5	–	5	–	0
Chico State	1	–	3	–	1	2	–	6	–	1
Sacramento State	1	–	4	–	0	3	–	5	–	1
Nevada	0	–	4	–	1	0	–	7	–	1
+ – Conference co-champions

The 1956 Sacramento State Hornets football team represented Sacramento State College—now known as California State University, Sacramento—as a member of the Far Western Conference (FWC) during the 1956 college football season. Led by Dave Strong in his third and final season as head coach, Sacramento State compiled an overall record of 3–5–1 with a mark of 1–4 in conference play, placing fifth in the FWC. For the season the team was outscored by its opponents 178 to 128. The Hornets played home games at Grant Stadium in Sacramento, California.

== Schedule ==
Date	Time	Opponent	Site	Result	Attendance	Source
September 21		at Los Angeles State*	Snyder Field; Los Angeles, CA	T 13–13		
September 29	8:00 p.m.	Southern Oregon*	Grant Stadium; Sacramento, CA	W 27–12		
October 6		Humboldt State	Grant Stadium; Sacramento, CA	L 19–20		
October 13	8:00 p.m.	Cal Aggies	Grant Stadium; Sacramento, CA (rivalry)	L 26–33	4,000	
October 20		Alameda NAS (CA) (Note: Naval Air Station Alameda was a Naval Air Station from 1940 to 1997. For many years they fielded a team that played against colleges and other military teams.)*	Alameda, CA	W 15–0		
October 27	8:00 p.m.	Chico State	Grant Stadium; Sacramento, CA	L 7–21	2,500	
November 3		at Nevada	Mackay Stadium (Note: This stadium is the predecessor to the current Mackay Stadium, which was opened for the 1966 season.); Reno, NV	W 21–20		
November 10		at San Francisco State	Cox Stadium; San Francisco, CA	L 0–26		
November 16		at Santa Barbara*	La Playa Stadium; Santa Barbara, CA	L 0–33		
*Non-conference game
