= Jim Sutherland =

American football player and coach (1914–1980)

Biographical details
- Born: August 20, 1914; Winnipeg, Manitoba, Canada
- Died: June 21, 1980 (aged 65); Hayden Lake, Idaho, U.S.

Playing career
- 1934–1936: USC
- Position: Halfback

Coaching career (HC unless noted)
- 1937–1940: Santa Monica HS (CA) (JV)
- 1941–1952: Santa Monica HS (CA)
- 1953–1954: California (backfield)
- 1955: Washington (offense)
- 1956–1963: Washington State

Head coaching record
- Overall: 37–39–4 (college); 79–13–3 (high school)
- Military career
- Allegiance: United States
- Branch: United States Navy
- Conflicts: World War II

James Swanson Sutherland (August 20, 1914 – June 21, 1980) was an American football player and coach. He was the head coach at Washington State University from 1956 to 1963, with a 37–39–4 (.488) record in eight seasons. An innovator, Sutherland ran a prototypical run-and-shoot offense at WSU in the early 1960s.

Born in Winnipeg, Manitoba, Sutherland moved from Canada to southern California at age nine and graduated from Inglewood High School in 1933. He attended the University of Southern California (USC) and was a halfback for the Trojans from 1934 to 1936, listed at 5 ft 10 in (1.78 m) and 184 lb (83 kg).

After graduating from USC in 1937, Sutherland stayed in the Los Angeles area and became a football and track coach at Santa Monica High School. He was its head football coach from 1941 to 1952, with the exception of three years that he served in the U.S. Navy during World War II; his record at SMHS was 79–13–3 (.847).

Sutherland became a college assistant in 1953 at the University of California, Berkeley under Pappy Waldorf for two years, then moved to the University of Washington in Seattle in 1955 under head coach John Cherberg.

In his final season at WSU in 1963, Sutherland's salary was $17,500, near the top for West Coast coaches. After a 3–6–1 season, he voluntarily stepped down in December with a year remaining on his contract, and then owned several automobile dealerships in Spokane.

Following an extended illness, Sutherland died in 1980 at age 65 at his home in Hayden Lake, Idaho, and was buried in Coeur d'Alene.

== Head coaching record ==
Year	Team	Overall	Conference	Standing	Bowl/playoffs
Washington State Cougars (Pacific Coast Conference) (1956–1958)
1956	Washington State	3–6–1	2–5–1	7th	
1957	Washington State	6–4	5–3	4th	
1958	Washington State	7–3	6–2	2nd	
Washington State Cougars (Independent) (1959–1961)
1959	Washington State	6–4			
1960	Washington State	4–5–1			
1961	Washington State	3–7			
Washington State Cougars (Athletic Association of Western Universities) (1962–1963)
1962	Washington State	5–4–1	1–1	3rd	
1963	Washington State	3–6–1	1–1	T–3rd	
Washington State:		37–39–4	15–12–1		
Total:		37–39–4			
