= 1956 Idaho Vandals football team =

American college football season

1956 Idaho Vandals football
- Conference: Pacific Coast Conference
- Record: 4–5 (0–4 PCC)
- Head coach: Skip Stahley (3rd season)
- Home stadium: Neale Stadium

1956 Pacific Coast Conference football standings
	Conf.					Overall
Team	W		L		T	W		L		T
No. 10 Oregon State $	6	–	1	–	1	7	–	3	–	1
No. 18 USC	5	–	2	–	0	8	–	2	–	0
UCLA	5	–	2	–	0	7	–	3	–	0
Washington	4	–	4	–	0	5	–	5	–	0
Oregon	3	–	3	–	2	4	–	4	–	2
Stanford	3	–	4	–	0	4	–	6	–	0
Washington State	2	–	5	–	1	3	–	6	–	1
California	2	–	5	–	0	3	–	7	–	0
Idaho	0	–	4	–	0	4	–	5	–	0
$ – Conference champion; Rankings from AP Poll

The 1956 Idaho Vandals football team represented the University of Idaho in the 1956 college football season. The Vandals were led by third-year head coach Skip Stahley and were members of the Pacific Coast Conference. Home games were played on campus at Neale Stadium in Moscow, with one home game in Boise at old Bronco Stadium at Boise Junior College.

Idaho compiled a 4–5 overall record but were 0–4 in the PCC. After four losses to open, the Vandals won three straight, then split the final two games.

After road losses to Washington and Oregon, the Vandals suffered a second straight loss in the Battle of the Palouse with neighbor Washington State, falling 19–33 at home on October 6. Following the game, skirmishes between student factions provoked the Moscow city police to use tear gas to control the situation. The following week, Idaho was depleted by injuries and came out on the short end of a 41-point homecoming shutout by Arizona State.

The most recent winning season for Idaho football was 18 years earlier in 1938, and the Vandals were a win shy in 1956. The streak was broken seven years later in 1963.

== Schedule ==
Date	Time	Opponent	Site	Result	Attendance	Source
September 22	2:00 pm	at Washington	Husky Stadium; Seattle, WA	L 21–53	25,185	
September 29	1:30 pm	at Oregon	Hayward Field; Eugene, OR	L 14–21	13,000	
October 6	2:00 pm	Washington State	Neale Stadium; Moscow, ID (Battle of the Palouse)	L 19–33	16,300	
October 13	2:00 pm	Arizona State*^{†}	Neale Stadium; Moscow, ID	L 0–41	6,500	
October 27	1:00 pm	at Utah*	Ute Stadium; Salt Lake City, UT	W 27–21	11,520	
November 3	8:00 pm	at Fresno State*	Ratcliffe Stadium; Fresno, CA	W 24–12		
November 10	1:00 pm	Utah State*	old Bronco Stadium; Boise, ID	W 42–20		
November 17	1:30 pm	Oregon State	Neale Stadium; Moscow, ID	L 10–14	5,000	
November 22	1:00 pm	Montana*	Dornblaser Field; Missoula, MT (Little Brown Stein, Thanksgiving)	W 14–0	3,000	
*Non-conference game; ^{†}Homecoming; All times are in Pacific time

== Notable players ==
This Vandal team had several players who went on to extended careers in professional football. Jerry Kramer of Sandpoint played eleven seasons at right guard with the Green Bay Packers and won five NFL titles (and the first two Super Bowls) under head coach Vince Lombardi. He was an All-Pro five times and was the lead blocker on the famous Packers sweep. Kramer made the NFL's all-decade team for the 1960s and was the last member of the NFL's 50th anniversary team to be inducted into the Pro Football Hall of Fame, at age 82 in 2018.

Wayne Walker of Boise played fifteen seasons with the Detroit Lions as an outside linebacker and was named All-Pro three times. Both were juniors in 1956 and were selected in the fourth round of the 1958 NFL draft; Kramer was 39th overall and Walker 45th, and both were periodic placekickers as pros. (As Vandals, Kramer was the kicker and Walker was the long snapper.)

Jim Prestel of Indianapolis was a defensive tackle for eight seasons in the NFL, primarily with the expansion Minnesota Vikings. A sophomore in 1956, he missed most of the following season due to his mother's terminal illness. Selected in the sixth round of the 1959 NFL draft, 70th overall, he was granted another year of eligibility and played for Idaho in 1959 and began his pro career with the Cleveland Browns in 1960. Prestel was also a standout player on the Vandal basketball team. He played in his final game at Idaho in the Battle of the Palouse in late October with a broken foot, then was sidelined and missed the basketball season.

== Coaching staff ==
- Don Swartz, line
- Jay Pattee, backs
- Bud Goodell, ends
- Clem Parberry, freshmen

== All-conference ==
No Vandals were on the All-PCC team or the second team. Honorable mention were quarterback Gary Johnson, tackle Dick Foster, guard Jerry Kramer, and center Wayne Walker.

== NFL draft ==
One Vandal was selected in the 1957 NFL draft:

Player	Position	Round	Pick	Franchise
Dick Foster	T	11th	129	Washington Redskins

Five juniors were selected in the 1958 NFL draft:

Player	Position	Round	Pick	Franchise
Jerry Kramer	G	4th	39	Green Bay Packers
Wayne Walker	C	4th	45	Detroit Lions
Larry Aldrich	E	11th	127	Pittsburgh Steelers
Wade Patterson	E	16th	183	Chicago Cardinals
Alvin Johnson	T	18th	216	Cleveland Browns

One sophomore was selected in the 1959 NFL draft:

Player	Position	Round	Pick	Franchise
Jim Prestel ^	T	6th	70	Cleveland Browns

^ Prestel was granted another year of eligibility and played for Idaho in 1959.
