= 1956 Pepperdine Waves football team =

American college football season

1956 Pepperdine Waves football
- Conference: Independent
- Record: 6–3
- Head coach: John Scolinos (2nd season)
- Home stadium: El Camino Stadium

1956 Western non-major college football independents records
	Conf.			Overall
Team	W	L	T	W		L		T
Cal Poly San Dimas		–		6	–	2	–	0
Hawaii		–		7	–	3	–	0
Pepperdine		–		6	–	3	–	0
La Verne		–		6	–	4	–	0
UC Riverside		–		1	–	6	–	0

The 1956 Pepperdine Waves football team represented George Pepperdine College (Note: Pepperdine University was known as George Pepperdine College from 1937 to 1970.) as an independent during the 1956 college football season. The team was led by second-year head coach John Scolinos and played home games at El Camino Stadium on the campus of El Camino College in Torrance, California. They finished the season with a record of 6–3.

== Schedule ==
Date	Opponent	Site	Result	Attendance	Source
September 22	at Arizona State–Flagstaff	Skidmore Field; Flagstaff, AZ	W 14–12		
September 29	at San Diego State	Aztec Bowl; San Diego, CA	L 7–27	11,000	
October 6	Cal Poly	El Camino Stadium; Torrance, CA	L 0–43		
October 13	at Long Beach State	Veterans Stadium; Long Beach, CA	L 12–26	6,000	
October 27	at Nevada	Mackay Stadium (Note: This stadium is the predecessor to the current Mackay Stadium, which was opened for the 1966 season.); Reno, NV	W 40–19		
November 3	Santa Barbara	El Camino Stadium; Torrance, CA	W 21–9		
November 9	San Diego NTS (Note: Naval Training Center San Diego (Naval Training Station) was a U.S. Navy facility from 1923 to 1997.)	El Camino Stadium; Torrance, CA	W 33–18		
November 16	Los Angeles State	El Camino Stadium; Torrance, CA ("Old Shoe" rivalry)	W 15–14		
November 24	Whittier	El Camino Stadium; Torrance, CA	W 23–13	1,800	
