= 1956 Hawaii Rainbows football team =

American college football season

1956 Hawaii Rainbows football
- Conference: Independent
- Record: 7–3
- Head coach: Hank Vasconcellos (5th season)
- Home stadium: Honolulu Stadium

1956 Western non-major college football independents records
	Conf.			Overall
Team	W	L	T	W		L		T
Cal Poly San Dimas		–		6	–	2	–	0
Hawaii		–		7	–	3	–	0
Pepperdine		–		6	–	3	–	0
La Verne		–		6	–	4	–	0
UC Riverside		–		1	–	6	–	0

The 1956 Hawaii Rainbows football team represented the University of Hawaiʻi at Mānoa as an independent during the 1956 college football season. In their fifth season under head coach Hank Vasconcellos, the Rainbows compiled a 7–3 record.

== Schedule ==
Date	Opponent	Site	Result	Attendance
August 31	Prep All-Stars	Honolulu Stadium; Honolulu, Territory of Hawaii	W 21–7	22,000
September 21	Naval Station Pearl Harbor	Honolulu Stadium; Honolulu, Territory of Hawaii	W 59–7	
September 28	Humboldt State	Honolulu Stadium; Honolulu, Territory of Hawaii	W 33–6	12,000
October 7	Hawaii Rams	Honolulu Stadium; Honolulu, Territory of Hawaii	W 32–7	1,000
October 20	at No. 15 Iowa	Iowa Stadium; Iowa City, IA	L 0–34	40,000
October 27	at Fresno State	Ratcliffe Stadium; Fresno, CA (rivalry)	L 20–39	7,000
November 9	Southern Oregon	Honolulu Stadium; Honolulu, Territory of Hawaii	W 59–0	5,500
November 18	Hawaii Marines	Honolulu Stadium; Honolulu, Territory of Hawaii	L 2–7	4,000
November 24	Lewis & Clark	Honolulu Stadium; Honolulu, Territory of Hawaii	W 45–6	6,000
November 30	San Jose State^{†}	Honolulu Stadium; Honolulu, Territory of Hawaii (rivalry)	W 20–0	6,000–7,500
^{†}Homecoming; Rankings from Coaches' Poll released prior to the game
