= 1956 San Jose State Spartans football team =

American college football season

1956 San Jose State Spartans football
- Conference: Independent
- Record: 2–7–1
- Head coach: Bob Bronzan (7th season)
- Home stadium: Spartan Stadium

1956 Western major college football independents records
	Conf.			Overall
Team	W	L	T	W		L		T
Air Force		–		6	–	2	–	1
Pacific (CA)		–		6	–	3	–	1
San Jose State		–		2	–	7	–	1

The 1956 San Jose State Spartans football team represented San Jose State College—now known as San Jose State University—as an independent during the 1956 college football season. Led by Bob Bronzan in his seventh and final season as head coach, the Spartans compiled a record of 2–7–1 and were outscored by opponents 301 to 186. The team played home games at Spartan Stadium in San Jose, California.

Bronzan finished his tenure at San Jose State with a record of 32–30–5, for a winning percentage of .515.

== Schedule ==
Date	Opponent	Site	Result	Attendance	Source
September 22	Drake	Spartan Stadium; San Jose, CA	W 26–7	12,000	
September 29	at Washington State	Rogers Field; Pullman, WA	L 18–33	9,000	
October 13	at Stanford	Stanford Stadium; Stanford, CA (rivalry)	L 20–40	25,000	
October 20	at San Diego State	Balboa Stadium; San Diego, CA	T 27–27	20,000–21,000	
October 27	at Arizona State	Goodwin Stadium; Tempe AZ	L 13–47	16,300	
November 3	Denver	Spartan Stadium; San Jose, CA	L 26–35	12,000	
November 10	at Pacific (CA)	Pacific Memorial Stadium; Stockton, CA (Victory Bell)	L 7–34	22,000	
November 17	Cal Poly	Spartan Stadium; San Jose, CA	W 35–28	8,000	
November 22	Fresno State	Spartan Stadium; San Jose, CA (rivalry)	L 14–30	7,000	
November 30	at Hawaii	Honolulu Stadium; Honolulu, Territory of Hawaii (rivalry)	L 0–20	7,000	

== Team players in the NFL ==
The following San Jose State players were selected in the 1957 NFL draft.

Player	Position	Round	Overall	NFL team
Bob Reinhart	Back	10	114	Cleveland Browns
