= Bob Bronzan =

American football player and coach (1919–2006)

Biographical details
- Born: January 11, 1919; Tehachapi, California, U.S.
- Died: December 10, 2006 (aged 87); Lincoln, California, U.S.

Playing career
- 1936–1939: San Jose State

Coaching career (HC unless noted)
- 1946–1949: San Jose State (assistant)
- 1950–1956: San Jose State
- 1958: Philadelphia Eagles (advisory coach)

Administrative career (AD unless noted)
- 1961–1972: San Jose State

Head coaching record
- Overall: 32–30–5

Robert T. Bronzan (January 11, 1919 – December 10, 2006) was an American football player and coach. He served as the head football coach at San Jose State University from 1950 to 1956, compiling a record of 32–30–5.

He played college football at San Jose State from 1936 to 1939 and later served as an assistant coach there from 1946 to 1949.

== Head coaching record ==
Year	Team	Overall	Conference	Standing	Bowl/playoffs
San Jose State Spartans (Independent) (1950–1956)
1950	San Jose State	6–3–1			
1951	San Jose State	2–7–1			
1952	San Jose State	6–3			
1953	San Jose State	4–4–1			
1954	San Jose State	7–3			
1955	San Jose State	5–3–1			
1956	San Jose State	2–7–1			
San Jose State:		32–30–5			
Total:		32–30–5			
