= 1956 Nevada Wolf Pack football team =

American college football season

1956 Nevada Wolf Pack football
- Conference: Far Western Conference
- Record: 0–7–1 (0–4–1 FWC)
- Head coach: Gordon McEachron (2nd season)
- Home stadium: Mackay Stadium

1956 Far Western Conference football standings
	Conf.					Overall
Team	W		L		T	W		L		T
Humboldt State +	4	–	1	–	0	9	–	2	–	0
Cal Aggies +	4	–	1	–	0	7	–	2	–	0
San Francisco State +	4	–	1	–	0	5	–	5	–	0
Chico State	1	–	3	–	1	2	–	6	–	1
Sacramento State	1	–	4	–	0	3	–	5	–	1
Nevada	0	–	4	–	1	0	–	7	–	1
+ – Conference co-champions

The 1956 Nevada Wolf Pack football team represented the University of Nevada during the 1956 college football season. Nevada competed as a member of the Far Western Conference (FWC). The Wolf Pack were led by second-year head coach Gordon McEachron and played their home games at Mackay Stadium.

== Schedule ==
Date	Opponent	Site	Result	Attendance	Source
September 22	at Idaho State*	Spud Bowl; Pocatello, ID	L 6–20		
September 29	San Francisco State	Mackay Stadium; Reno, NV	L 20–32		
October 6	Cal Aggies	Mackay Stadium; Reno, NV	L 19–27		
October 13	at Chico State	College Field; Chico, CA	T 6–6		
October 20	at Los Angeles State*	Snyder Field; Los Angeles, CA	L 14–26		
October 27	Pepperdine*^{†}	Mackay Stadium; Reno, NV	L 19–40		
November 3	Sacramento State	Mackay Stadium; Reno, NV	L 20–21		
November 10	Humboldt State	Mackay Stadium; Reno, NV	L 18–26	3,000	
*Non-conference game; ^{†}Homecoming
