= 1956 San Francisco State Gators football team =

American college football season

1956 San Francisco State Gators football

FWC co-champion
- Conference: Far Western Conference
- Record: 5–5 (4–1 FWC)
- Head coach: Joe Verducci (7th season)
- Home stadium: Cox Stadium

1956 Far Western Conference football standings
	Conf.					Overall
Team	W		L		T	W		L		T
Humboldt State +	4	–	1	–	0	9	–	2	–	0
Cal Aggies +	4	–	1	–	0	7	–	2	–	0
San Francisco State +	4	–	1	–	0	5	–	5	–	0
Chico State	1	–	3	–	1	2	–	6	–	1
Sacramento State	1	–	4	–	0	3	–	5	–	1
Nevada	0	–	4	–	1	0	–	7	–	1
+ – Conference co-champions

The 1956 San Francisco State Gators football team represented San Francisco State College—now known as San Francisco State University—as a member of the Far Western Conference (FWC) during the 1956 college football season. Led by seventh-year head coach Joe Verducci, San Francisco State compiled an overall record of 5–5 with a mark of 4–1 in conference play, sharing the FWC title with the Cal Aggies and Humboldt State. For the season the team was outscored by its opponents 177 to 168. The Gators played home games at Cox Stadium in San Francisco.

== Schedule ==
Date	Opponent	Site	Result	Attendance	Source
September 15	at San Quentin State Prison*	San Quentin Prison (Note: This was the third annual game against San Quentin Prison. All of the games were held within the walls of the prison itself.); San Quentin, CA	W 27–12		
September 22	at Cal Poly*	Mustang Stadium; San Luis Obispo, CA	L 7–25		
September 29	at Nevada	Mackay Stadium (Note: This stadium is the predecessor to the current Mackay Stadium, which was opened for the 1966 season.); Reno, NV	W 32–20		
October 5	San Diego State*	Cox Stadium; San Francisco, CA	L 6–26	5,000	
October 13	at Humboldt State	Redwood Bowl; Arcata, CA	L 7–34		
October 20	at Fresno State*	Ratcliffe Stadium; Fresno, CA	L 0–28	6,719	
October 26	Redlands*	Cox Stadium; San Francisco, CA	L 6–7		
November 3	at Cal Aggies	Aggie Field; Davis, CA	W 10–0		
November 10	Sacramento State	Cox Stadium; San Francisco, CA	W 26–0		
November 16	Chico State	Cox Stadium; San Francisco, CA	W 47–25		
*Non-conference game
