= Jim Verdieck =

American football and tennis coach (1919–2001)

Biographical details
- Born: June 9, 1919; Colton, California, U.S.
- Died: October 26, 2001 (aged 82); Escondido, California, U.S.

Playing career

Football
- 1939–1940: Stanford
- Position: Center

Coaching career (HC unless noted)

Football
- 1941: Menlo (assistant)
- 1945: San Bernardino Valley (assistant)
- 1946–1952: Redlands (assistant)
- 1953–1958: Redlands

Tennis
- 1947–1984: Redlands

Head coaching record
- Overall: 34–19–3 (college football); 921–281 (college tennis)

Accomplishments and honors

Championships
- Football; 1 SCIAC (1956)

James Edwin Verdieck (June 9, 1919 – October 26, 2001) was an American football and tennis coach. He served as the head football coach at Redlands University in Redlands, California from 1953 to 1958, compiling a record of 34–19–3. Verdieck played college football at Stanford University as a center. He was a member of Clark Shaughnessy's 1940 Stanford Indians football team, which went undefeated, winning the Pacific Coast Conference and the 1941 Rose Bowl.

== Head coaching record ==
=== College football ===
| Year | Team | Overall | Conference | Standing | Bowl/playoffs |
|---|---|---|---|---|---|
Redlands Bulldogs (Southern California Intercollegiate Athletic Conference) (1953–1958)
| 1953 | Redlands | 6–4 | 2–2 | T–2nd | |
| 1954 | Redlands | 5–4–1 | 2–1–1 | 2nd | |
| 1955 | Redlands | 3–4–1 | 1–3 | 4th | |
| 1956 | Redlands | 9–0 | 4–0 | 1st | |
| 1957 | Redlands | 4–4–1 | 2–1–1 | 3rd | |
| 1958 | Redlands | 7–3 | 3–1 | 2nd | |
| Redlands: | | 34–19–3 | 14–8–2 | | |
| Total: | | 34–19–3 | | | |
National championship Conference title Conference division title or championship game berth
