= 1956 Cal Poly San Dimas Broncos football team =

American college football season

1956 Cal Poly San Dimas Broncos football
- Conference: Independent
- Record: 6–2
- Head coach: Bob Stull (1st season)

1956 Western non-major college football independents records
	Conf.			Overall
Team	W	L	T	W		L		T
Cal Poly San Dimas		–		6	–	2	–	0
Hawaii		–		7	–	3	–	0
Pepperdine		–		6	–	3	–	0
La Verne		–		6	–	4	–	0
UC Riverside		–		1	–	6	–	0

The 1956 Cal Poly San Dimas Broncos football team represented the Cal Poly Kellogg-Voorhis Unit—now known as California State Polytechnic University, Pomona—as an independent during the 1956 college football season. Led by Bob Stull in his first and only season as head coach, Cal Poly San Dimas compiled a record of 6–2. (Note: The footnote PDF published by the Cal Poly Pomona athletic department, and available on their website, lists an additional 1956 game against the University of San Diego. However, the USD media guide does not list that game, and a newspaper article in the Los Angeles Times published after the Nov. 16 game says that their final record was 6-2.) The team outscored its opponents 215 to 84 for the season.

== Schedule ==
Date	Opponent	Site	Result
September ?	at Chino Institute for Men	Chino, CA	W 28–0
October 6	at UC Riverside	Highlander Stadium; Riverside, CA	W 32–0
October 13	at Redlands	Redlands Stadium (Note: This stadium is the predecessor to the current Ted Runner Stadium on the University of Redlands campus, which was opened for the 1968 season); Redlands, CA	L 7–26
October 20	La Verne	?	W 28–18
October 27	California Baptist	?	W 48–0
November 3	at Caltech	Rose Bowl; Pasadena, CA	L 20–21
November 10	Barstow Marines	?	W 21–19
November 16	UC Riverside	Pomona, CA	W 31–0
