= 1956 Oregon Ducks football team =

American college football season

1956 Oregon Ducks football
- Conference: Pacific Coast Conference
- Record: 4–4–2 (3–3–2 PCC)
- Head coach: Len Casanova (6th season)
- Captain: Phil McHugh
- Home stadium: Hayward Field, Multnomah Stadium

1956 Pacific Coast Conference football standings
	Conf.					Overall
Team	W		L		T	W		L		T
No. 10 Oregon State $	6	–	1	–	1	7	–	3	–	1
No. 18 USC	5	–	2	–	0	8	–	2	–	0
UCLA	5	–	2	–	0	7	–	3	–	0
Washington	4	–	4	–	0	5	–	5	–	0
Oregon	3	–	3	–	2	4	–	4	–	2
Stanford	3	–	4	–	0	4	–	6	–	0
Washington State	2	–	5	–	1	3	–	6	–	1
California	2	–	5	–	0	3	–	7	–	0
Idaho	0	–	4	–	0	4	–	5	–	0
$ – Conference champion; Rankings from AP Poll

The 1956 Oregon Ducks football team represented the University of Oregon as a member of the Pacific Coast Conference (PCC) during the 1956 college football season. In their sixth season under head coach Len Casanova, the Ducks compiled a 4–4–2 record (3–3–2 against PCC opponents), finished in fifth place in the PCC, and outscored their opponents, 133 to 102. The team played home games at Hayward Field in Eugene, Oregon, and Multnomah Stadium in Portland, Oregon.

The team's statistical leaders included Tom Crabtree with 366 passing yards, Jack Morris with 519 rushing yards, and Jim Shanley with 173 receiving yards.

== Schedule ==
Date	Opponent	Rank	Site	Result	Attendance	Source
September 22	at Colorado*		Folsom Field; Boulder, CO	W 35–0	40,500	
September 29	Idaho	No. 18	Hayward Field; Eugene, OR	W 21–14	13,000	
October 5	at UCLA		Los Angeles Memorial Coliseum; Los Angeles, CA	L 0–6	32,097	
October 13	at Washington		Husky Stadium; Seattle, WA (rivalry)	L 7–20	33,500	
October 20	Stanford		Hayward Field; Eugene, OR	L 7–21	14,800	
October 27	at No. 13 Pittsburgh*		Pitt Stadium; Pittsburgh, PA	L 7–14	36,872	
November 3	at California		California Memorial Stadium; Berkeley, CA	W 28–6	32,000	
November 10	Washington State		Hayward Field; Eugene, OR	T 7–7	13,200	
November 17	No. 14 USC		Multnomah Stadium; Portland, OR	W 7–0	14,480	
November 22	at No. 11 Oregon State		Parker Stadium; Corvallis, OR (Civil War)	T 14–14	17,300	
*Non-conference game; Rankings from AP Poll released prior to the game; Source:
