= 1956 San Diego State Aztecs football team =

American college football season

1956 San Diego State Aztecs football
- Conference: California Collegiate Athletic Association
- Record: 4–3–2 (2–1 CCAA)
- Head coach: Paul Governali (1st season)
- Home stadium: Aztec Bowl, Balboa Stadium

1956 California Collegiate Athletic Association football standings
	Conf.					Overall
Team	W		L		T	W		L		T
Fresno State	2	–	0	–	0	8	–	2	–	0
San Diego State	2	–	1	–	0	4	–	3	–	2
Santa Barbara	2	–	1	–	0	5	–	5	–	0
Los Angeles State	1	–	1	–	0	3	–	5	–	1
Cal Poly	1	–	2	–	0	7	–	3	–	0
Long Beach State	0	–	3	–	0	3	–	5	–	0
No champion named for the 1956 season

The 1956 San Diego State Aztecs football team represented San Diego State College—now known as San Diego State University—as a member of the California Collegiate Athletic Association (CCAA) during the 1956 college football season. Led by first-year head coach Paul Governali, the Aztecs compiled an overall record of 4–3–2 with a mark of 2–1 in conference play, tying for second place in the CCAA. San Diego State played home games at Aztec Bowl and Balboa Stadium, both located in San Diego.

== Schedule ==
Date	Opponent	Site	Result	Attendance	Source
September 29	Pepperdine*	Aztec Bowl; San Diego, CA	W 27–7	11,000	
October 5	at San Francisco State*	Cox Stadium; San Francisco, CA	W 26–6	5,000	
October 13	at Cal Poly	Mustang Stadium; San Luis Obispo, CA	W 7–6		
October 20	San Jose State*	Balboa Stadium; San Diego, CA	T 27–27	20,000–21,000	
October 27	San Diego Marines (Note: The Marine Corps Recruit Depot (MCRD) in San Diego fielded a team that played against colleges and other military teams from 1922 to 1964.)*^{†}	Aztec Bowl; San Diego, CA	T 19–19	11,000	
November 3	at Arizona State*	Goodwin Stadium; Tempe, AZ	L 0–61	16,000	
November 10	at Santa Barbara	La Playa Stadium; Santa Barbara, CA	W 30–7	4,000	
November 17	Fresno State	Aztec Bowl; San Diego, CA (rivalry)	L 7–50	11,000	
November 24	at New Mexico*	Zimmerman Field; Albuquerque, NM	L 6–34	6,000	
*Non-conference game; ^{†}Homecoming
