= Carl Selin =

American sports coach (1927–2014)

Biographical details
- Born: February 23, 1927; Berkeley, California, U.S.
- Died: February 23, 2014 (aged 87); Hood River, Oregon, U.S.

Playing career

Football
- ?: Northern Illinois

Coaching career (HC unless noted)

Football
- 1951–1952: Aurora
- 1956–1958: UC Riverside
- 1959–?: Coast Guard (assistant)

Basketball
- 1951–1953: Aurora

Baseball
- 1952–1953: Aurora
- c. 1960: Coast Guard

Administrative career (AD unless noted)
- 1966–1979: Coast Guard

Head coaching record
- Overall: 5–26–3 (football); 4–35 (basketball); 5–24–1 (baseball)

Accomplishments and honors

Awards
- NCAA Regional Baseball Coach of the Year (1963); USCGA Hall of Fame (2004)

Carl Warren Selin (February 23, 1927 – February 23, 2014) was an American college football, college basketball, and college baseball coach. He served as the head football coach at Aurora University from 1950 to 1951 and at the University of California, Riverside from 1956 to 1958. Selin was also the head basketball coach at Aurora from 1951 to 1953, where he compiled a record of 4–35. In addition, Selin was the head baseball coach at Aurora from 1952 to 1953, posting a record of 5–24–1.

Selin was the head baseball coach at the United States Coast Guard Academy for five years in the early 1960s, where he also served as the athletic director from 1966 until his retirement in 1979.

== Head coaching record ==
=== Football ===
Year	Team	Overall	Conference	Standing	Bowl/playoffs
Aurora Spartans (Badger-Illini Conference) (1951–1952)
1951	Aurora	0–7	0–6		
1952	Aurora	1–6	1–5		
Aurora:		1–13	1–11		
UC Riverside Highlanders (Independent) (1956–1958)
1956	UC Riverside	1–6			
1957	UC Riverside	1–4–1			
1958	UC Riverside	2–3–2			
UC Riverside:		4–13–3			
Total:		5–26–3			
