= David Wilson (defensive back) =

American football player (born 1970)

No. 26, 24, 25
- Position: Defensive back

Personal information
- Born: June 10, 1970 (age 56); Los Angeles, California, U.S.
- Listed height: 5 ft 10 in (1.78 m)
- Listed weight: 192 lb (87 kg)

Career information
- High school: Reseda (Los Angeles)
- College: California (1988–1991)
- NFL draft: 1992: 7th round, 183rd overall pick

Career history
- Minnesota Vikings (1992)*; New England Patriots (1992); Minnesota Vikings (1992–1993); Los Angeles Rams (1994)*; Scottish Claymores (1996)
- * Offseason or practice squad member only

Awards and highlights
- Second-team All-Pac-10 (1991)
- Stats at Pro Football Reference

David Alan Wilson (born June 10, 1970) is an American former professional football defensive back who played in the National Football League (NFL).

Wilson was born in Los Angeles, California and attended Reseda High School. He played collegiately at the University of California and was drafted by the Minnesota Vikings in the seventh round of the 1992 NFL draft, the 183rd overall pick.

Wilson played for the Vikings and the New England Patriots during his brief NFL career.

Pre-draft measurables
Height	Weight	Arm length	Hand span	Vertical jump	Bench press
5 ft 10 3/8 in (1.79 m)	201 lb (91 kg)	31 3/4 in (0.81 m)	8 1/2 in (0.22 m)	37.0 in (0.94 m)	11 reps
