= 1956 Humboldt State Lumberjacks football team =

American college football season

1956 Humboldt State Lumberjacks football

FWC co-champion
- Conference: Far Western Conference
- Record: 9–2 (4–1 FWC)
- Head coach: Phil Sarboe (6th season)
- Home stadium: Redwood Bowl

1956 Far Western Conference football standings
	Conf.					Overall
Team	W		L		T	W		L		T
Humboldt State +	4	–	1	–	0	9	–	2	–	0
Cal Aggies +	4	–	1	–	0	7	–	2	–	0
San Francisco State +	4	–	1	–	0	5	–	5	–	0
Chico State	1	–	3	–	1	2	–	6	–	1
Sacramento State	1	–	4	–	0	3	–	5	–	1
Nevada	0	–	4	–	1	0	–	7	–	1
+ – Conference co-champions

The 1956 Humboldt State Lumberjacks football team represented Humboldt State College—now known as California State Polytechnic University, Humboldt—as a member of the Far Western Conference (FWC) during the 1956 college football season. Led by sixth-year head coach Phil Sarboe, the Lumberjacks compiled an overall record of 9–2 with a mark of 4–1 in conference play, sharing the FWC title with the Cal Aggies and San Francisco State. The team outscored its opponents 254 to 171 for the season. Humboldt State played home games at the Redwood Bowl in Arcata, California.

== Schedule ==
Date	Opponent	Site	Result	Attendance	Source
September 15	Moffett Field Air Corps (Note: Naval Air Station Moffett Field was a Naval Air Station from 1933 to 1994.)*	Redwood Bowl; Arcata, CA	W 48–0	3,200	
September 22	at Southern Oregon*	Fuller Field; Ashland, OR	W 33–6		
September 28	at Hawaii*	Honolulu Stadium; Honolulu, HI	L 6–33	12,000	
October 6	at Sacramento State	Grant Stadium; Sacramento, CA	W 20–19		
October 13	San Francisco State	Redwood Bowl; Arcata, CA	W 34–7		
October 20	Western Washington*	Redwood Bowl; Arcata, CA	W 20–13		
October 27	at Cal Aggies	Aggie Field; Davis, CA	L 0–14		
November 3	Chico State^{†}	Redwood Bowl; Arcata, CA	W 7–6		
November 10	at Nevada	Mackay Stadium (Note: This stadium is the predecessor to the current Mackay Stadium, which was opened for the 1966 season.); Reno, NV	W 26–18	3,000	
November 17	Seattle Ramblers (club team)*	Redwood Bowl; Arcata, CA	W 21–13	2,500	
November 22	Whitman*	Redwood Bowl; Arcata, CA	W 54–20	3,000	
*Non-conference game; ^{†}Homecoming
