= 1956 Fresno State Bulldogs football team =

American college football season

1956 Fresno State Bulldogs football
- Conference: California Collegiate Athletic Association
- Record: 8–2 (2–0 CCAA)
- Head coach: Clark Van Galder (5th season)
- Home stadium: Ratcliffe Stadium

1956 California Collegiate Athletic Association football standings
	Conf.					Overall
Team	W		L		T	W		L		T
Fresno State	2	–	0	–	0	8	–	2	–	0
San Diego State	2	–	1	–	0	4	–	3	–	2
Santa Barbara	2	–	1	–	0	5	–	5	–	0
Los Angeles State	1	–	1	–	0	3	–	5	–	1
Cal Poly	1	–	2	–	0	7	–	3	–	0
Long Beach State	0	–	3	–	0	3	–	5	–	0
No champion named for the 1956 season

The 1956 Fresno State Bulldogs football team represented Fresno State College—now known as California State University, Fresno—as a member of the California Collegiate Athletic Association (CCAA) during the 1956 college football season. Led by fifth-year head coach Clark Van Galder, Fresno State compiled an overall record of 8–2 with a mark of 2–0 in conference play, placing first in CCAA standings, but no champion was named. The Bulldogs played home games at Ratcliffe Stadium on the campus of Fresno City College in Fresno, California

== Schedule ==
Date	Opponent	Site	Result	Attendance	Source
September 22	at BYU*	Cougar Stadium (Note: This stadium is the predecessor to the current Cougar Stadium on the BYU campus, which was opened for the 1964 season); Provo, UT	W 26–13	8,330	
September 29	at Willamette*	McCulloch Stadium; Salem, OR	W 27–12		
October 5	San Diego Marines (Note: The Marine Corps Recruit Depot (MCRD) in San Diego fielded a team that played against colleges and other military teams from 1922 to 1964.)*	Ratcliffe Stadium; Fresno, CA	W 2–0	7,800	
October 13	Pacific (CA)*	Ratcliffe Stadium; Fresno, CA	L 14–21	13,923–15,000	
October 20	San Francisco State*	Ratcliffe Stadium; Fresno, CA	W 28–0	6,719	
October 27	Hawaii*	Ratcliffe Stadium; Fresno, CA (rivalry)	W 39–20	8,430	
November 3	Idaho*	Ratcliffe Stadium; Fresno, CA	L 12–24	10,018	
November 10	Cal Poly	Ratcliffe Stadium; Fresno, CA	W 21–13	8,372	
November 17	at San Diego State	Aztec Bowl; San Diego, CA (rivalry)	W 50–7	11,000	
November 22	at San Jose State*	Spartan Stadium; San Jose, CA (rivalry)	W 30–14	7,000	
*Non-conference game

== Team players in the NFL/AFL ==
The following were selected in the 1957 NFL draft.

Player	Position	Round	Overall	NFL team
Bill Murphy	End	10	120	Chicago Bears
Darryl Rogers	Back	24	280	Los Angeles Rams
Nick Brown	Guard	27	324	Chicago Bears

The following finished their college career in 1956, were not drafted, but played in the AFL (prior to the merge with the NFL).

Player	Position	First AFL team
Bob Garner	Defensive back	1960 Los Angeles Chargers
