= 1956 Redlands Bulldogs football team =

American college football season

1956 Redlands Bulldogs football

SCIAC champion
- Conference: Southern California Intercollegiate Athletic Conference
- Record: 9–0 (4–0 SCIAC)
- Head coach: Jim Verdieck (4th season)
- Home stadium: UR Stadium

1956 Southern California Intercollegiate Athletic Conference football standings
| | Conf. | | | | | Overall |
| Team | W | | L | | T | W | | L | | T |
|---|---|---|---|---|---|---|---|---|---|---|
| Redlands $ | 4 | – | 0 | – | 0 | 9 | – | 0 | – | 0 |
| Pomona-Claremont | 2 | – | 1 | – | 1 | 4 | – | 3 | – | 1 |
| Whittier | 2 | – | 1 | – | 1 | 4 | – | 3 | – | 3 |
| Occidental | 1 | – | 3 | – | 0 | 3 | – | 6 | – | 0 |
| Caltech | 0 | – | 4 | – | 0 | 3 | – | 5 | – | 0 |
$ – Conference champion

The 1956 Redlands Bulldogs football team was an American football team that represented the University of Redlands as a member of the Southern California Conference (SCC) during the 1956 college football season. In their fourth year under head coach Jim Verdieck, the Bulldogs compiled a 9–0 record (4–0 against SCC opponents), won the SCC championship, and outscored opponents by a total of 230 to 51. It was the second undefeated season in Redlands football history and the program's eighth SCIAC championship.

Redlands led the SCIAC in both offense (307.6 yards and 25.5 points per game) and defense (168.5 yards and 5.7 points per game).

Fullback Howard Newman led the SCIAC in scoring with 54 points on nine touchowns. Quarterback Howard Tipton ranked among the conference leaders in rushing, passing, and scoring, and was named to the 1956 United Press Little All Pacific football team. Tipton scored 42 points and averaged 4.8 yards per carry on 101 carries.

Three Redlands players were selected by the conference coaches as first-team players on the 1956 All-SCIAC football team: Tipton; end Jack Crowder; and center Dean Westgaard. Three others were named to the second team: guard Mike Lewis; tackle Joe Houser; and fullback Howard Newman.

The team played home games at UR Stadium in Redlands, California.

== Schedule ==
| Date | Time | Opponent | Site | Result | Attendance | Source |
|---|---|---|---|---|---|---|
| September 22 | 8:00 p.m. | Barstow Marines* | UR Stadium; Redlands, CA | W 21–19 | | |
| September 29 | | vs. La Verne* | Covina, CA | W 41–0 | | |
| October 6 | | at Caltech | Rose Bowl; Pasadena, CA | W 13–0 | | |
| October 13 | | Cal Poly San Dimas* | UR Stadium; Redlands, CA | W 26–7 | | |
| October 20 | | at Pomona-Claremont | Claremont, CA | W 14–0 | | |
| October 26 | | San Francisco State* | Cox Stadium; San Francisco, CA | W 7–6 | | |
| November 3 | | Occidental^{†} | UR Stadium; Redlands, CA | W 28–0 | 5,800 | |
| November 9 | | at Edwards Air Force Base* | Victorville, CA | W 46–6 | | |
| November 17 | | Whittier | Redlands, CA | W 34–13 | > 6,500 | |
*Non-conference game; ^{†}Homecoming; All times are in Pacific time
