= 1956 Chico State Wildcats football team =

American college football season

1956 Chico State Wildcats football
- Conference: Far Western Conference
- Record: 2–6–1 (1–3–1 FWC)
- Head coach: Gus Manolis (3rd season)
- Home stadium: College Field

1956 Far Western Conference football standings
	Conf.					Overall
Team	W		L		T	W		L		T
Humboldt State +	4	–	1	–	0	9	–	2	–	0
Cal Aggies +	4	–	1	–	0	7	–	2	–	0
San Francisco State +	4	–	1	–	0	5	–	5	–	0
Chico State	1	–	3	–	1	2	–	6	–	1
Sacramento State	1	–	4	–	0	3	–	5	–	1
Nevada	0	–	4	–	1	0	–	7	–	1
+ – Conference co-champions

The 1956 Chico State Wildcats football team represented Chico State College—now known as California State University, Chico—as a member of the Far Western Conference (FWC) during the 1956 college football season. Led by third-year head coach Gus Manolis, Chico State compiled an overall record of 2–6–1 with a mark of 1–3–1 in conference play, placing fourth in the FWC. The team was outscored by its opponents 142 to 123 for the season. The Wildcats played home games at College Field in Chico, California.

== Schedule ==
Date	Time	Opponent	Site	Result	Attendance	Source
September 22		Naval Air Station Alameda (Note: Naval Air Station Alameda was a Naval Air Station from 1940 to 1997. For many years they fielded a team that played against colleges and other military teams.)*	College Field; Chico, CA	W 26–0		
September 29		Los Angeles State*	College Field; Chico, CA	L 0–7		
October 6		at Southern Oregon*	Fuller Field; Ashland, OR	L 6–27		
October 13		Nevada	College Field; Chico, CA	T 6–6		
October 20		Lewis & Clark*	College Field; Chico, CA	L 26–28		
October 27	8:00 p.m.	at Sacramento State	Grant Stadium; Sacramento, CA	W 21–7	2,500	
November 3		at Humboldt State	Redwood Bowl; Arcata, CA	L 6–7		
November 10		Cal Aggies	College Field; Chico, CA	L 7–13		
November 16		at San Francisco State	Cox Stadium; San Francisco, CA	L 25–47		
*Non-conference game
