= 1956 Stanford Indians football team =

American college football season

1956 Stanford Indians football
- Conference: Pacific Coast Conference
- Record: 4–6 (3–4 PCC)
- Head coach: Chuck Taylor (6th season)
- Home stadium: Stanford Stadium

1956 Pacific Coast Conference football standings
	Conf.					Overall
Team	W		L		T	W		L		T
No. 10 Oregon State $	6	–	1	–	1	7	–	3	–	1
No. 18 USC	5	–	2	–	0	8	–	2	–	0
UCLA	5	–	2	–	0	7	–	3	–	0
Washington	4	–	4	–	0	5	–	5	–	0
Oregon	3	–	3	–	2	4	–	4	–	2
Stanford	3	–	4	–	0	4	–	6	–	0
Washington State	2	–	5	–	1	3	–	6	–	1
California	2	–	5	–	0	3	–	7	–	0
Idaho	0	–	4	–	0	4	–	5	–	0
$ – Conference champion; Rankings from AP Poll

The 1956 Stanford Indians football team represented Stanford University in the 1956 college football season. The team was led by Chuck Taylor in his sixth year. The team played their home games at Stanford Stadium in Stanford, California.

== Schedule ==
Date	Opponent	Rank	Site	Result	Attendance	Source
September 22	at Washington State	No. 14	Memorial Stadium; Spokane, WA	W 40–26	23,000	
September 29	No. 3 Michigan State*	No. 12	Stanford Stadium; Stanford, CA	L 7–21	55,000	
October 6	at No. 4 Ohio State*		Ohio Stadium; Columbus, OH	L 20–32	82,881	
October 13	San Jose State*		Stanford Stadium; Stanford, CA (rivalry)	W 40–20	25,000	
October 20	at Oregon		Hayward Field; Eugene, OR	W 21–7	14,800	
October 27	No. 6 USC		Stanford Stadium; Stanford, CA (rivalry)	W 27–19	70,000	
November 3	at UCLA	No. 10	Los Angeles Memorial Coliseum; Los Angeles, CA	L 13–14	76,505	
November 10	No. 14 Oregon State	No. 20	Stanford Stadium; Stanford, CA	L 19–20	63,000	
November 17	Washington		Stanford Stadium; Stanford, CA	L 13–34	21,000	
November 24	at No. 19 California		California Memorial Stadium; Berkeley, CA (Big Game)	L 18–20	81,400	
*Non-conference game; Rankings from AP Poll released prior to the game; Source:

== NFL draft ==
Three Stanford Indians were selected in the 1957 NFL draft.

Player	Position	Round	Pick	NFL club
John Brodie	Quarterback	1	3	San Francisco 49ers
Paul Camera	End	4	42	Cleveland Browns
Allen Napolean	Back	24	283	Cleveland Browns

- Defensive end Paul Wiggin was selected in the previous year's draft by the Cleveland Browns.
