= 1956 Los Angeles State Diablos football team =

American college football season

1956 Los Angeles State Diablos football
- Conference: California Collegiate Athletic Association
- Record: 3–5–1 (1–1 CCAA)
- Head coach: Leonard Adams (6th season)
- Home stadium: Snyder Stadium; East Los Angeles College Stadium; Reseda High School

1956 California Collegiate Athletic Association football standings
	Conf.					Overall
Team	W		L		T	W		L		T
Fresno State	2	–	0	–	0	8	–	2	–	0
San Diego State	2	–	1	–	0	4	–	3	–	2
Santa Barbara	2	–	1	–	0	5	–	5	–	0
Los Angeles State	1	–	1	–	0	3	–	5	–	1
Cal Poly	1	–	2	–	0	7	–	3	–	0
Long Beach State	0	–	3	–	0	3	–	5	–	0
No champion named for the 1956 season

The 1956 Los Angeles State Diablos football team represented Los Angeles State College—now known as California State University, Los Angeles—as a member of the California Collegiate Athletic Association (CCAA) during the 1956 college football season. Led by sixth-year head coach Leonard Adams, Los Angeles State compiled an overall record of 3–5–1 with a mark of 1–1 in conference play, placing fourth in the CCAA. The Diablos played six home games at three separate sites: three games at Snyder Stadium in Los Angeles, two games East Los Angeles College Stadium in Monterey Park, California, and one game at Reseda High School in Reseda, Los Angeles.

== Schedule ==
Date	Opponent	Site	Result
September 14	University of Mexico*	East Los Angeles College Stadium; Monterey Park, CA	L 6–14
September 21	Sacramento State*	Snyder Field; Los Angeles, CA	T 13–13
September 29	at Chico State*	College Field; Chico, CA	W 7–0
October 5	Occidental*	Snyder Field; Los Angeles, CA	L 6–13
October 11	Santa Barbara	Reseda High School; Reseda, CA	L 13–33
October 20	Nevada*	Snyder Field; Los Angeles, CA	W 26–14
October 27	Long Beach State	East L.A. College Stadium; Monterey Park, CA	W 23–0
November 2	at Mexico Poly*	Estadio Wilfrido Massieu; Mexico City, Mexico	L 6–28
November 16	at Pepperdine*	El Camino Stadium; Torrance, CA ("Old Shoe" rivalry)	L 14–15
*Non-conference game
