= 1956 Oregon State Beavers football team =

American college football season

1956 Oregon State Beavers football

PCC champion

Rose Bowl, L 19–35 vs. Iowa
- Conference: Pacific Coast Conference

Ranking
- Coaches: No. 13
- AP: No. 10
- Record: 7–3–1 (6–1–1 PCC)
- Head coach: Tommy Prothro (2nd season)
- Captains: Dick Corrick; Gerry Laird
- Home stadium: Parker Stadium; Multnomah Stadium

1956 Pacific Coast Conference football standings
	Conf.					Overall
Team	W		L		T	W		L		T
No. 10 Oregon State $	6	–	1	–	1	7	–	3	–	1
No. 18 USC	5	–	2	–	0	8	–	2	–	0
UCLA	5	–	2	–	0	7	–	3	–	0
Washington	4	–	4	–	0	5	–	5	–	0
Oregon	3	–	3	–	2	4	–	4	–	2
Stanford	3	–	4	–	0	4	–	6	–	0
Washington State	2	–	5	–	1	3	–	6	–	1
California	2	–	5	–	0	3	–	7	–	0
Idaho	0	–	4	–	0	4	–	5	–	0
$ – Conference champion; Rankings from AP Poll

The 1956 Oregon State Beavers football team represented Oregon State College as a member the Pacific Coast Conference (PCC) during the 1956 college football season. In the regular season, the Beavers outscored their opponents 184 to 131 on their way to a 7–2–1 record (6–1–1 in PCC, first). They played three home games on campus at Parker Stadium in Corvallis, with one at Multnomah Stadium in Portland. The team captains were center Dick Corrick and quarterback Gerry Laird.

Led by second-year head coach Tommy Prothro, Oregon State won the PCC title and were ranked tenth in the final AP poll, released in early December. In the Rose Bowl, they met third-ranked Iowa of the Big Ten Conference. The teams had met in early October in Iowa City, and the home team won by a point. In the rematch in southern California on New Year's Day, OSC lost again and finished at 7–3–1.

== Schedule ==
Date	Opponent	Rank	Site	TV	Result	Attendance	Source
September 22	at Missouri*		Memorial Stadium; Columbia, MO		W 19–13	22,000	
September 28	at No. 6 USC		Los Angeles Memorial Coliseum; Los Angeles, CA		L 13–21	53,714	
October 6	at No. 20 Iowa*		Iowa Stadium; Iowa City, IA		L 13–14	41,027	
October 13	California		Parker Stadium; Corvallis, OR	NBC	W 21–13	14,125	
October 20	at Washington State		Rogers Field; Pullman, WA		W 21–0	14,500	
October 27	UCLA		Parker Stadium; Corvallis, OR		W 21–7	17,080	
November 3	Washington	No. 17	Multnomah Stadium; Portland, OR		W 28–20	32,890	
November 10	at No. 20 Stanford	No. 14	Stanford Stadium; Stanford, CA		W 20–19	63,000	
November 17	at Idaho	No. 11	Neale Stadium; Moscow, ID		W 14–10	5,000	
November 22	Oregon	No. 11	Parker Stadium; Corvallis, OR (Civil War)		T 14–14	17,300	
January 1, 1957	vs. No. 3 Iowa*	No. 10	Rose Bowl; Pasadena, CA (Rose Bowl)	NBC	L 19–35	97,126	
*Non-conference game; Rankings from AP Poll released prior to the game; Source:
