= 1956 Washington Huskies football team =

American college football season

1956 Washington Huskies football
- Conference: Pacific Coast Conference
- Record: 5–5 (4–4 PCC)
- Head coach: Darrell Royal (1st season)
- Captains: Dean Derby; Corky Lewis
- Home stadium: University of Washington Stadium

1956 Pacific Coast Conference football standings
| | Conf. | | | | | Overall |
| Team | W | | L | | T | W | | L | | T |
|---|---|---|---|---|---|---|---|---|---|---|
| No. 10 Oregon State $ | 6 | – | 1 | – | 1 | 7 | – | 3 | – | 1 |
| No. 18 USC | 5 | – | 2 | – | 0 | 8 | – | 2 | – | 0 |
| UCLA | 5 | – | 2 | – | 0 | 7 | – | 3 | – | 0 |
| Washington | 4 | – | 4 | – | 0 | 5 | – | 5 | – | 0 |
| Oregon | 3 | – | 3 | – | 2 | 4 | – | 4 | – | 2 |
| Stanford | 3 | – | 4 | – | 0 | 4 | – | 6 | – | 0 |
| Washington State | 2 | – | 5 | – | 1 | 3 | – | 6 | – | 1 |
| California | 2 | – | 5 | – | 0 | 3 | – | 7 | – | 0 |
| Idaho | 0 | – | 4 | – | 0 | 4 | – | 5 | – | 0 |
$ – Conference champion; Rankings from AP Poll

The 1956 Washington Huskies football team was an American football team that represented the University of Washington during the 1956 college football season. In its only season under head coach Darrell Royal, the team compiled a 5–5 record, finished in fourth place in the Pacific Coast Conference, and was outscored 232 to 206.

Royal was hired as head coach at the University of Texas following the season, where he stayed for twenty seasons and compiled a 167–47–5 (.774) record, including national championships in 1963, 1969, and 1970. The Huskies' next two head coaches stayed for eighteen years each: Jim Owens (1957–74) and Don James (1975–92).

== Schedule ==
| Date | Opponent | Site | Result | Attendance | Source |
|---|---|---|---|---|---|
| September 22 | Idaho | University of Washington Stadium; Seattle, WA | W 53–21 | 25,185 | |
| September 29 | Minnesota* | University of Washington Stadium; Seattle, WA | L 14–34 | 40,000 | |
| October 6 | No. 13 Illinois* | University of Washington Stadium; Seattle, WA | W 28–13 | 36,000 | |
| October 13 | Oregon | University of Washington Stadium; Seattle, WA (rivalry) | W 20–7 | 33,500 | |
| October 20 | at No. 9 USC | Los Angeles Memorial Coliseum; Los Angeles, CA | L 7–35 | 44,749 | |
| October 27 | California | University of Washington Stadium; Seattle, WA | L 7–16 | 31,000 | |
| November 3 | at No. 17 Oregon State | Multnomah Stadium; Portland, OR | L 20–28 | 32,890 | |
| November 10 | No. 19 UCLA | University of Washington Stadium; Seattle, WA | L 9–13 | 27,500 | |
| November 17 | at Stanford | Stanford Stadium; Stanford, CA | W 34–13 | 21,000 | |
| November 24 | at Washington State | Memorial Stadium; Spokane, WA (rivalry) | W 40–26 | 20,700 | |
*Non-conference game; Rankings from AP Poll released prior to the game; Source:

== Coaching staff ==
- Jim Pittman (line)
- Roy Wellsey (backs)
- Mike Campbell (ends)
- John Baker (line)
- Jack Swarthout (freshmen)

== NFL draft selections ==
Four University of Washington Huskies were selected in the 1957 NFL draft, which lasted 30 rounds with 360 selections.

| = Husky Hall of Fame |

| Player | Position | Round | Pick | NFL club |
| George Strugar | Tackle | 3rd | 27 | Los Angeles Rams |
| Dean Derby | Back | 5th | 51 | Los Angeles Rams |
| Don McCumby | Tackle | 9th | 106 | Chicago Cardinals |
| Credell Green | Back | 18th | 207 | Green Bay Packers |
