= Don Ellingsen =

Former American football end

Profile
- Position: End

Personal information
- Listed height: 5 ft 10 in (1.78 m)
- Listed weight: 160 lb (73 kg)

Career information
- College: Washington State (1956-1958)

Awards and highlights
- Led PCC in receiving yards and receptions, 1957; Washington State record in pole vault

Don Ellingsen (born c. 1937) was an American football end. He played for the Washington State Cougars from 1956 to 1958 and led the Pacific Coast Conference (PCC) in receiving yards and receptions in 1957.

== Early life ==
Ellingsen was the son of Carl "Tuffy" Ellingsen who played for Washington State in the early 1930s. Both have been inducted into the Washington State Athletic Hall of Fame, the only father and son to be so honored.

== Washington State ==
Ellingsen played college football at Washington State from 1956 to 1958. He played at the end position on offense and at safety on defense. He also returned punts.

As a sophomore in 1956, Ellingsen ranked second in the Pacific Coast Conference (PCC) and fifth nationally with 455 receiving yards. His average of 16.9 yards per reception was best in the PCC.

As a junior in 1957, Ellingsen led the PCC and ranked second nationally with 45 receptions. He also led the PCC (fourth nationally) with 559 receiving yards.

In three years at Washington State, Ellinsen appeared in 30 games and tallied 86 receptions for 1,166 yards and seven touchdowns. He graduated from Washington State with the highest grade point average ever for a varsity athlete.

Ellingsen also competed in the pole Vault and set a Washington State record in the event.

== Later life ==
Ellingsen later worked as an ophthalmologist in Spokane, Washington.
