= 1956 USC Trojans football team =

American college football season

1956 USC Trojans football
- Conference: Pacific Coast Conference

Ranking
- Coaches: No. 15
- AP: No. 18
- Record: 8–2 (5–2 PCC)
- Head coach: Jess Hill (6th season)
- Captain: Jon Arnett
- Home stadium: Los Angeles Memorial Coliseum

1956 Pacific Coast Conference football standings
	Conf.					Overall
Team	W		L		T	W		L		T
No. 10 Oregon State $	6	–	1	–	1	7	–	3	–	1
No. 18 USC	5	–	2	–	0	8	–	2	–	0
UCLA	5	–	2	–	0	7	–	3	–	0
Washington	4	–	4	–	0	5	–	5	–	0
Oregon	3	–	3	–	2	4	–	4	–	2
Stanford	3	–	4	–	0	4	–	6	–	0
Washington State	2	–	5	–	1	3	–	6	–	1
California	2	–	5	–	0	3	–	7	–	0
Idaho	0	–	4	–	0	4	–	5	–	0
$ – Conference champion; Rankings from AP Poll

The 1956 USC Trojans football team represented the University of Southern California (USC) in the 1956 college football season. In their sixth and final year under head coach Jess Hill, the Trojans compiled an 8–2 record (5–2 against conference opponents), finished in a tie for second place in the Pacific Coast Conference, and outscored their opponents by a combined total of 218 to 126. The team was ranked No. 15 in the final United Press Coaches Poll and No. 18 in the final AP poll. Total attendance for all 10 games was 469,762.

Frank Hall led the team in passing with 10 of 23 passes completed for 196 yards, two touchdowns and one interception. C. R. Roberts led the team in rushing with 120 carries for 775 yards and five touchdowns. Tony Ortega was the leading receiver with seven catches for 223 yards and one touchdown. Ernie Zampese rushed for 500 yards and passed for 166 yards.

Two Trojans received first-team honors from the Associated Press or the United Press (UP) on the 1956 All-Pacific Coast Conference football team: backs C. R. Roberts (AP-1; UP-1 [fullback]) and Jon Arnett, USC (UP-1 [halfback]).

== Schedule ==
Date	Opponent	Rank	Site	Result	Attendance	Source
September 22	at Texas*	No. 15	Texas Memorial Stadium; Austin, TX	W 44–20	47,000	
September 28	Oregon State	No. 6	Los Angeles Memorial Coliseum; Los Angeles, CA	W 21–13	53,714	
October 6	at Wisconsin*	No. 10	Camp Randall Stadium; Madison, WI	W 13–6	52,944	
October 20	Washington	No. 9	Los Angeles Memorial Coliseum; Los Angeles, CA	W 35–7	44,749	
October 27	at Stanford	No. 6	Stanford Stadium; Stanford, CA (rivalry)	L 19–27	70,000	
November 3	at Washington State	No. 20	Rogers Field; Pullman, WA	W 28–12	13,000	
November 10	California^{†}	No. 16	Los Angeles Memorial Coliseum; Los Angeles, CA	W 20–7	41,628	
November 17	at Oregon	No. 14	Multnomah Stadium; Portland, OR	L 0–7	14,480	
November 24	at UCLA		Los Angeles Memorial Coliseum; Los Angeles, CA (Victory Bell)	W 10–7	63,709	
December 1	Notre Dame*	No. 17	Los Angeles Memorial Coliseum; Los Angeles, CA (rivalry)	W 28–20	64,538	
*Non-conference game; ^{†}Homecoming; Rankings from AP Poll released prior to the game; Source:

== Game summaries ==
=== At Texas ===
- C.R. Roberts 12 rushes, 251 yards

== Personnel ==
=== Coaching staff ===
- Head coach: Jess Hill
- Assistant coaches: Nick Pappas (back coach), Mel Hein (line coach), George Ceithaml (back coach), Bill Fisk (end coach), Joe Margucci (JV coach), Don Clark (line coach), Bob Titchenal (freshman)
- Senior football manager: Mike O'Dell

=== Roster ===
The following players were members of the 1956 USC football team.

- Fabian Abram, tackle, 6'3", 215 pounds, Redondo Beach, California
- Jon Arnett, senior HB (#26)
- George Belotti, tackle, 6'3", 253 pounds, Oxnard, California
- Ron Fletcher, tackle, 6'3", 215 pounds, Los Angeles
- Walt Gurasich, guard, 6'1", 219 pounds, Sherman Oaks, California
- Frank Hall, quarterback, 6'0", 175 pounds, San Francisco, California
- Mike Henry, tackle, 6'2", 212 pounds, Los Angeles
- Don Hickman, halfback, 5'10", 170 pounds, Monterey Park, California
- Hillard Hill, end, 6'1", 188 pounds, Pasadena, California
- Ells Kissinger, quarterback, 5'10, 183 pounds, York, Pennsylvania
- Ben Lardizabal, guard, 5'11", 210 pounds, Los Angeles
- Chuck Leimbach, end, 6'4", 193 pounds, Los Angeles
- C. R. Roberts, fullback, 6'1", 206 pounds, Oceanside, California
- Bob Rosendahl, end, 6'1", 178 pounds, Lynwood, California
- Karl Rubke, center, 6'4", 225 pounds, Lynwood, California
- Laird Willott, guard, 6'0", 205 pounds, Glendale, California
- Ernie Zampese, halfback, 5'9", 166 pounds, Santa Barbara, California
