= 1956 Cal Poly Mustangs football team =

American college football season

1956 Cal Poly Mustangs football
- Conference: California Collegiate Athletic Association
- Record: 7–3 (1–2 CCAA)
- Head coach: LeRoy Hughes (7th season)
- Home stadium: Mustang Stadium

1956 California Collegiate Athletic Association football standings
	Conf.					Overall
Team	W		L		T	W		L		T
Fresno State	2	–	0	–	0	8	–	2	–	0
San Diego State	2	–	1	–	0	4	–	3	–	2
Santa Barbara	2	–	1	–	0	5	–	5	–	0
Los Angeles State	1	–	1	–	0	3	–	5	–	1
Cal Poly	1	–	2	–	0	7	–	3	–	0
Long Beach State	0	–	3	–	0	3	–	5	–	0
No champion named for the 1956 season

The 1956 Cal Poly Mustangs football team represented California Polytechnic State College—now known as California Polytechnic State University, San Luis Obispo—as a member of the California Collegiate Athletic Association (CCAA) during the 1956 college football season. Led by seventh-year head coach LeRoy Hughes, Cal Poly compiled an overall record of 7–3 with a mark of 1–2 in conference play, placing fifth in the CCAA. The team outscored its opponents 270 to 116 for the season. The Mustangs played home games at Mustang Stadium in San Luis Obispo, California.

== Schedule ==
Date	Opponent	Site	Result	Attendance	Source
September 22	San Francisco State*	Mustang Stadium; San Luis Obispo, CA	W 25–7		
September 29	New Mexico A&M*	Mustang Stadium; San Luis Obispo, CA	W 32–7		
October 6	at Pepperdine*	El Camino Stadium; Torrance, CA	W 43–0		
October 13	San Diego State	Mustang Stadium; San Luis Obispo, CA	L 6–7		
October 20	Long Beach State	Mustang Stadium; San Luis Obispo, CA	W 65–12	6,000	
October 27	at College of Idaho*	Hayman Field; Caldwell, ID	W 7–6		
November 3	San Diego Marines (Note: The Marine Corps Recruit Depot (MCRD) in San Diego fielded a team that played against colleges and other military teams from 1922 to 1964.)*	Mustang Stadium; San Luis Obispo, CA	W 27–8		
November 10	at Fresno State	Ratcliffe Stadium; Fresno, CA	L 13–21	8,372	
November 17	at San Jose State*	Spartan Stadium; San Jose, CA	L 28–35	8,000	
November 24	Midwestern State (TX)*	Mustang Stadium; San Luis Obispo, CA	W 24–13		
*Non-conference game
