= 1956 Long Beach State 49ers football team =

American college football season

1956 Long Beach State 49ers football
- Conference: California Collegiate Athletic Association
- Record: 5–3 (0–3 CCAA)
- Head coach: Mike DeLotto (2nd season)
- Home stadium: Veterans Memorial Stadium

1956 California Collegiate Athletic Association football standings
	Conf.					Overall
Team	W		L		T	W		L		T
Fresno State	2	–	0	–	0	8	–	2	–	0
San Diego State	2	–	1	–	0	4	–	3	–	2
Santa Barbara	2	–	1	–	0	5	–	5	–	0
Los Angeles State	1	–	1	–	0	3	–	5	–	1
Cal Poly	1	–	2	–	0	7	–	3	–	0
Long Beach State	0	–	3	–	0	3	–	5	–	0
No champion named for the 1956 season

The 1956 Long Beach State 49ers football team represented Long Beach State College—now known as California State University, Long Beach—as a member of the California Collegiate Athletic Association (CCAA) during the 1956 college football season. Led by second-year head coach Mike DeLotto, the 49ers compiled an overall record of 5–3 with a mark of 0–3 in conference play, placing last out of six teams in the CCAA. The team played home games at Veterans Memorial Stadium adjacent to the campus of Long Beach City College in Long Beach, California.

== Schedule ==
Date	Opponent	Site	Result	Attendance	Source
September 22	Occidental*	Veterans Memorial Stadium; Long Beach, CA	W 14–13		
October 6	at Santa Barbara	La Playa Stadium; Santa Barbara, CA	L 6–13	8,000	
October 13	Pepperdine*	Veterans Memorial Stadium; Long Beach, CA	W 26–12	6,000	
October 20	at Cal Poly	Mustang Stadium; San Luis Obispo, CA	L 12–65	6,000	
October 26	Los Angeles State	East Los Angeles College Stadium; Los Angeles, CA	L 0–23		
November 3	La Verne*	La Verne Stadium; La Verne, CA	W 23–20		
November 9	Arizona State–Flagstaff*	Veterans Memorial Stadium; Long Beach, CA	W 7–6	2,800	
November 17	Cal Aggies*	Veterans Memorial Stadium; Long Beach, CA	W 10–0	2,300	
*Non-conference game
