= Pappy Waldorf =

American football player and coach (1902–1981)

- Waldorf pictured in The Redskin 1930, Oklahoma A&M yearbook

Biographical details
- Born: October 3, 1902; Clifton Springs, New York, U.S.
- Died: August 15, 1981 (aged 78); Berkeley, California, U.S.

Playing career
- 1922–1924: Syracuse
- Position: Tackle

Coaching career (HC unless noted)
- 1925–1927: Oklahoma City
- 1928: Kansas (line)
- 1929–1933: Oklahoma A&M
- 1934: Kansas State
- 1935–1946: Northwestern
- 1947–1956: California

Administrative career (AD unless noted)
- 1933–1934: Oklahoma A&M

Head coaching record
- Overall: 174–100–22
- Bowls: 0–3

Accomplishments and honors

Championships
- 1 OIC (1927); 3 MVC (1930, 1932–1933); 1 Big Six (1934); 1 Big Ten (1936); 3 PCC (1949–1951)

Awards
- AFCA Coach of the Year (1935); Amos Alonzo Stagg Award (1970); Second-team All-American (1924)
- College Football Hall of Fame; Inducted in 1966 (profile)

Lynn Osbert "Pappy" Waldorf (October 3, 1902 – August 15, 1981) was an American college football player and coach. He received the first national collegiate football coach of the year award in 1935. Waldorf became known for his motivational coaching, connection with his players and the extremely organized and consistent coaching technique. He won conference titles with each of the five teams that he coached. Waldorf coached from 1925 to 1956, serving as the head football coach at Oklahoma City University, Oklahoma State University, Kansas State University, Northwestern University, and the University of California, Berkeley. Waldorf's career coaching record was 174–100–22. Waldorf was inducted into the College Football Hall of Fame in 1966.

== Early years ==
Waldorf, a son of Methodist bishop Ernest Lynn Waldorf, was born in Clifton Springs, New York. As a collegiate athlete, Waldorf played tackle for Syracuse University from 1922 to 1924 and was named an All American in each of those three years. He was also a member of the Syracuse Orange men's crew in 1923. He graduated with degrees in sociology and psychology. In 1925 he married his wife, Louise McKay.

== Coaching career ==
=== Oklahoma City ===
In 1925 Waldorf was hired as an athletic director at Oklahoma City University, which is affiliated with the United Methodist Church. He was able to get the job through his father, a Methodist bishop. Waldorf also became the head coach for football, basketball, and track teams. He was paid $4,000 per year, a substantial salary for that time.

As a coach Waldorf emphasized the fundamentals of blocking and tackling as well as each player's involvement in practice. In his three years as the head coach he was able to turn the one-win and seven-loss Oklahoma City Goldbugs into and an eight-win, one-loss and two-tie shared Collegiate Conference champion. As an athletic director and administrator Waldorf was successful in funding and constructing sports facilities as well generating new income through scheduling games against powerhouse opponents. He left Oklahoma City in 1927.

=== Kansas ===
After leaving the Goldbugs, Waldorf served one year as an assistant coach at the University of Kansas.

=== Oklahoma A&M ===
In 1929, after one year at Kansas, the 26 year old Waldorf became the head coach at the Oklahoma Territorial Agricultural and Mechanical University. Oklahoma A&M is now called the Oklahoma State University at Stillwater and is also known as OSU. He coached there from 1929 to 1933.

As a coach Waldorf emphasized the same blocking and tackling fundamentals as he did at Oklahoma City. He hired Albert Exendine as the backfield assistant coach, who was at the Carlisle Indian Industrial School under Pop Warner. Waldorf's and Exedine's cooperation brought forth one of the significant innovations in football, they developed a precursor to future development of individual position substitutions as well as separate offensive and defensive units. Several backfield groups were created, consisting of quarterback, fullback and two halfbacks. These groups where then rotated in between plays depending on the on field situation.

As a coach, Waldorf became known for putting the players through hard work and discipline as well as encouraging them through mentoring and humor. This approach to coaching had an immediate effect. In 1928, the year before Waldorf's arrival, the team won only one game and lost the other seven. They lost their rivalry game against University of Oklahoma forty six to nothing. In his first year Waldorf's team won four, lost three and tied Oklahoma seven to seven. The year after that Oklahoma A&M won seven games including, beating Oklahoma seven to nothing. From 1929 to 1933 Waldorf went 34–10–7, winning three Missouri Valley Conference championships. He never lost to Oklahoma, with the Cowboys holding their arch-rivals scoreless for 19 quarters in a row. Waldorf's reputation was soaring and he was actively recruited by other universities.

In 1931, in order to deal with the significant financial difficulties brought by the Great Depression, Waldorf took on the responsibilities of the university's athletic director. Previously, Waldorf had already brought administrative changes, such as installation of stadium lights to play night games, as well as holding some games on Fridays. Following 1931, Oklahoma A&M could not maintain his salary and had to decrease it. In 1934 Waldorf left the university to become the new head coach at Kansas State University.

=== Kansas State ===
In 1934, Waldorf replaced Bo McMillin as football coach at Kansas State. Waldorf coached the Wildcats for only one season, 1934. They won the Big Six Conference championship, the first Big Six title in football for the school.

=== Northwestern ===
In 1935, Waldorf moved to Northwestern University, where he remained head coach until 1946. One year prior to his arrival and under coach Dick Hanley, Northwestern won only two Big Ten games. During his first year, and with little possibly of immediate success, Waldorf chose to rely on advice he received from then revered University of Illinois coach Robert Zuppke: 'When you're faced with one of those years when your material is only fair and you're not going to win many games, put your eggs in one basket. Pick a tough team and lay for it. Knock it off, and you've go yourself a season ... That's exactly what I did my first year at Northwestern. The target I chose was Notre Dame." That year's team went 2-3-1 in the Big-10, it handed Notre Dame its sole loss of the 1935 season.

Later, Waldorf recalled advice from Amos Alonzo Stagg, who is also considered one of the greats and was the coach at University of Chicago. He told Waldorf that a coach should remember that the players are also young students at the university and that their other concerns should be recognized while the coach is the primary figure in their lives.

During his first year Waldorf relied on assistance from Litz Rusness, a holdover from the previous years. Rusness' approach involved intensive film study of team opponents, he noted the ever-evolving strategy of changing offensive positions and was curious why the defenses did not use the same approach to both confuse the opponents and to specifically counter their offensive adjustments. The positions of the offensive backfield would be analyzed and the resulting plays would be predicted based on earlier film study of the opponent. Instructions on resulting adjustments would then be hand-signed to the defensive players.

Waldorf and Rusness created formations designed specifically against Notre Dame's offense, with these formations being practiced throughout the season. On November 9, 1935, at its home field, Notre Dame suffered its only loss of the season, Northwestern won the game 14 to 7. It was Northwestern's first win over Notre Dame in previous 18 tries. Suffering the loss Notre Dame were deprived of a likely national championship. It was during that win's celebration that Waldorf's staff began calling him "Pappy".

In 1936, Waldorf's second year, the Wildcats went 7–1, undefeated in the Big Ten, winning the conference. Their only loss came at the end of the season at Notre Dame. The Fighting Irish won 26 to 3, taking their turn at ruining their opponents chance for a national championship. Aside from winning conference championship, that season is also remembered for beating Minnesota, a team that was on a 28-game winning streak and outscored its opponents 203 to 32 during the season. Even though Minnesota lost at Northwestern six to zero, they were still declared the 1936 national champions by the AP poll.

The season is also known for Waldorf's introduction of an unbalanced offensive line, the first instance of a slot formation, which allowed the offense to deploy four receivers instead of two. The team was led by an All-American tackle Bob Voigts, who later succeeded Waldorf in 1947 and won the 1949 Rose Bowl - coaching the Wildcats to beat Waldorf's University of California.

The highlights of the next ten seasons were Northwestern finishing in third place in 1940 and 1943. Waldorf's 1940 team included the Chicago star player Bill DeCorrevont and defeated dominant Notre Dame 20 to 0. There were also two Big Ten winless seasons in 1942 and 1944. In 1942, Waldorf had to deal with changes brought on by United States entry into World War II. For purposes of a boost in military morale the number of games was raised to ten. During these years there was a significant player shortage due to the military draft. To retain the 1941 season, freshmen were allowed to compete on varsity teams. That season, Waldorf only had four returning starters. However, the season also brought important positives that would only be seen the following year. Waldorf considered the 1942 Wildcats to be his first great passing team. It was led by legendary quarterback and future coach Otto Graham. Although the team won only one game, Graham finished the season with then conference record breaking numbers - on 182 attempts he completed 89 passes for 1,092 yards. (Note: Waldorf: "Our pet play was run from the Single Wing, called "Number One Pass." We'd pull both guards and roll the tailback out to the right, where he could either run or pass. It put a strain on the left defensive half back, who'd have to watch for the running threat, and if the defense rotated, both ends were open for passes.")

Next season, everything clicked, the 1943 team beat the Ohio State, the defending national champions, with the team's only losses coming from Notre Dame and Michigan, the team finished the season with an 8–2 record and a ninth-place ranking in the Associated Press Poll. Graham set another Big Ten passing record and finished third in Heisman Trophy voting. Next year, Graham transferred to another team. Without him Waldorf could only manage a single win. That year Northwestern squad was made out of 51 players with 43 of them being freshmen.

During Waldorf's later years at Northwestern, he received assistance from the Chicago Bears in developing the T formation, a stance that the Bears were successful at deploying. (Note: Waldorf: "Our version featured single-wing shoulder blocking. We wanted to move defenders on the edge of the defense out of the way to make the most of our halfacks' ability to get a quick start. .. We developed a play called '42 Crossfire,' which accomplished this. It was a counter play, with the left half carrying off right tackle. The keys to this play were the quarterback making a good fake to the fullback and the right guard pulling out to block the man of the defense's perimeter.) Waldorf also served as an unofficial coach on the annually voted for All-Star College Player v. NFL Champions game. He assisted the All-Star coaches and participated in training because the annual game was played at Chicago's Soldier Field with the college players being hosted at Northwestern.

During the first post WWII, 1946 season, Waldorf's team won only two games in the Big Ten, it was his last year at Northwestern.

=== California ===
1956 Big Game

In 1946, the University of California (Cal) won only two games while losing seven. Following the season the Associated Students of the University of California exercised its unique power and voted to fire that season's coach Frank Wickhorst. Shortly after that Waldorf was offered the head coaching position. He had previously visited and liked northern California and after considering the generous offer, Waldorf decided to accept the position. Back at Northwestern, the athletic administration allowed Waldorf to leave two years before the end of the contract. Waldorf personally addressed his team and was the first person that let them know that he was leaving the university.

On the first day of the 1947 season California defeated Santa Clara University 33–7. The game was at home and following the win Waldorf addressed the crowd from the balcony over the north western gate of the Memorial Stadium. He commented on the played game and complemented the crowd for their support. This would become a tradition and would happen after every home game until 1956, the end of Waldorf's coaching at California. The team finished the season with nine wins and only one loss - to University of Southern California (USC) . In the Big Game, California's traditional rivalry against Stanford University, California won for the first time since 1941.

In 1948, Waldorf's team went 10–0, beating USC and getting revenge for the previous season's only loss. Waldorf saw the offensive line as the key to that season's success as well as the rushing of Jackie Jensen an All American that year and a future baseball star. That season Jensen set California record rushing 1,010 yards in a single season. Cal was invited to play in the 1949 Rose Bowl for the first time in 11 years. In that season's game Waldorf faced Northwestern, the previous team that he coached, coached by his former star player Bob Voigts. California lost that game 20-14. A controversial moment in the game is now known as the "phantom touchdown," when Northwestern's player was given a touchdown even though he fumbled the ball as while he was crossing the line, California disputed the touchdown arguing that the ball was fumbled prior to its crossing the line. California's claim is supported by a photograph taken at that moment.

Following the 1949 season the Bears were again undefeated and invited to the Rose Bowl, where they lost again, this time to Ohio State. That game was the first bowl game with over 100,000 in attendance. One of the unfortunate highlights of the following 1950 season, was the death of Waldorf's long time friend Sam Barry, who was an assistant coach and scout at USC. He had a heart attack while during California's game against Santa Clara. As a condolence and out of respect for his friend Waldorf sent Cal's film recording of the game to the USC head coach Jeff Cravath, using film for scouting was illegal at the time but was forgiven by the conference due to the circumstances. During that season the Golden Bears were again undefeated. The stars were fullback Johnny Olszewski, a future NFL mainstay, and guard-linebacker Les Richter, the first Golden Bear to be inducted into the Pro Football Hall of Fame. The undefeated Golden Bears were again invited to the Rose Bowl where they again lost, this time to University of Michigan.

From 1949 to 1951, Waldorf brought California to three straight Rose Bowls. In all three games, and prior to losing, California was either tied or ahead until the last quarter. The team was not invited to the 1952 Rose Bowl because Cal lost two games during that season. From his first season 1947 to the two losses of 1951, Waldorf's Golden Bears were 46-3-1 during the regular seasons.

In 1953 the National Collegiate Athletic Association changed the game by canceling a rule that was in place since World War Two. A team could no longer make multiple substitutions and have specific players for each position, only one substitution could be made per play. Up to this change Waldorf's approach was to use highly specialized players for key positions, which no longer became possible after the change. With the rule was withdrawn Cal went from 7–3 in 1952 to 4-4-2 the next season. The team did not have a winning season after 1953 and Pappy retired at the end of the 1956 season when Cal went 3–7. During the late 1950s NCAA kept changing its rules and by 1964 it again allowed unlimited substitutions.

In 1956, it became known that Waldorf was possibly involved in a 1953 recruiting scandal involving star freshman quarterback Ronnie Knox. In order to have Knox enroll at the university, the California football booster club promised him that Knox's step father to be hired as a scout, his high school coach would be hired as an assistant coach, and that Knox himself would be given a job writing for a local newspaper and also be paid $500 per year by the booster club. Knox enrolled at Cal but California's administration found out and made sure that the benefits would not be provided. After one year at Cal, Knox transferred to University of California, Los Angeles (UCLA). Following investigation by both administration and the PCC conference, it was found that Waldorf was not directly involved in the scandal. However, it was found that Waldorf did approve creation of the booster club without approval from the administration. Waldorf was required to write a letter of apology to the administration. The scandal also involved other schools. Three other universities - UCLA, USC and University of Washington where punished with three years of probation, fines, bowl bans, TV bans and players losing multiple games of eligibility. Because of California's own actions to prevent the violations it received a smaller fine and a single year of probation.

The 1956 season was Waldorf's last at the university, with the team's record being 2–7. In his last game Waldorf was able to beat Stanford even though California was a 14-point underdog. The players knew that it was Waldorf's last game and following the win he was carried off the field on those players' shoulders. After the game Waldorf made his last speech from the north western gate of California's stadium. His final words to the approximately 18,000 fans before him where "I love you, and I always will."

== Following coaching retirement ==
Soon after his retirement as a college football coach, Waldorf began a 12-year career in professional football as the head of college scouting at San Francisco 49ers. During his long career in college football Waldorf established positive relationships with coaches and heads of programs throughout college football, and is considered as establishing a closer relationship between college and professional football in the 1960s. Prior to this period professional scouts were often banned from attending practices and using the press boxes during the matches.

Waldorf retired from the 49ers in 1972. Remaining in the Bay Area, he died on August 15, 1981, at 78 years old.

== Head coaching record ==
Year	Team	Overall	Conference	Standing	Bowl/playoffs	Coaches^{#}	AP^{°}
Oklahoma City Goldbugs (Oklahoma Intercollegiate Conference) (1925–1927)
1925	Oklahoma City	4–6	3–5	7th			
1926	Oklahoma City	5–4–1	3–4–1	7th			
1927	Oklahoma City	8–1–2	5–1–1	T–1st			
Oklahoma City:		17–11–3	11–10–2				
Oklahoma A&M Cowboys (Missouri Valley Conference) (1929–1933)
1929	Oklahoma A&M	4–3–2	1–1	3rd			
1930	Oklahoma A&M	7–2–1	2–0	T–1st			
1931	Oklahoma A&M	8–2–1	1–0	2nd			
1932	Oklahoma A&M	9–1–2	3–0	1st			
1933	Oklahoma A&M	6–2–1	2–0	1st			
Oklahoma A&M:		34–10–7	9–1				
Kansas State Wildcats (Big Six Conference) (1934)
1934	Kansas State	7–2–1	5–0	1st			
Kansas State:		7–2–1	5–0				
Northwestern Wildcats (Big Ten Conference) (1935–1946)
1935	Northwestern	4–3–1	2–3–1	5th			
1936	Northwestern	7–1	6–0	1st			7
1937	Northwestern	4–4	3–3	T–4th			
1938	Northwestern	4–2–2	2–1–2	4th			17
1939	Northwestern	3–4–1	3–2–1	5th			
1940	Northwestern	6–2	4–2	3rd			8
1941	Northwestern	5–3	4–2	4th			11
1942	Northwestern	1–9	0–6	9th			
1943	Northwestern	6–2	5–1	3rd			9
1944	Northwestern	1–7–1	0–5–1	8th			
1945	Northwestern	4–4–1	3–3–1	T–4th			
1946	Northwestern	4–4–1	2–3–1	T–6th			
Northwestern:		49–45–7	34–31–7				
California Golden Bears (Pacific Coast Conference) (1947–1956)
1947	California	9–1	5–1	2nd			15
1948	California	10–1	6–0	T–1st	L Rose		4
1949	California	10–1	7–0	1st	L Rose		3
1950	California	9–1–1	5–0–1	1st	L Rose	4	5
1951	California	8–2	5–2	3rd		12	12
1952	California	7–3	3–3	4th			
1953	California	4–4–2	2–2–2	4th			
1954	California	5–5	4–3	4th			
1955	California	2–7–1	1–5–1	T–7th			
1956	California	3–7	2–5	8th			
California:		67–32–4	40–21–4				
Total:		174–100–22					
National championship Conference title Conference division title or championship game berth
^{#}Rankings from final Coaches Poll.; ^{°}Rankings from final AP Poll.

== Books ==
- Cameron, Steve; Greenburg, John (2000). Pappy The Gentle Bear. Lenexa, KS USA: Addax Publishing Group.
