= Litz Rusness =

American football coach (1891–1967)

Biographical details
- Born: June 14, 1891; Moorhead, Minnesota, U.S.
- Died: October 11, 1967 (aged 76); Evanston, Illinois, U.S.
- Education: Moorhead Normal

Playing career

Football
- c. 1913: Fargo
- c. 1915: Moorhead Normal

Baseball
- c. 1913: Fargo
- 1915: Fargo-Moorhead Graingrowers

Coaching career (HC unless noted)

Football
- 1920–1921: Moorhead Normal
- 1922–1923: Fargo HS (ND)
- 1924–1925: North Dakota (assistant)
- 1926–1943: Northwestern (freshmen/scout)

Baseball
- 1927–?: Northwestern (freshmen)

Administrative career (AD unless noted)
- c. 1920: Moorhead Normal
- c. 1948: Philadelphia Eagles (scout)

Head coaching record
- Overall: 6–5 (college football)

Lawrence Wallace "Litz" Rusness (June 14, 1891 – October 11, 1967) was an American football and baseball coach, athletics administrator, and lawyer. He served as the head football coach at Moorhead Normal School—now known as Minnesota State University Moorhead—in Moorhead, Minnesota for two seasons, from 1920 to 1921, compiling a record of 6–5.

Rusness was born on June 14, 1891, in Moorhead, where he graduated from high school. He played football at Fargo College and Moorhead Normal. Rusness served in France as a artillery lieutenant in the United States Army during World War I.

In 1922, Rusness was hired as the football coach at Fargo High School—later known as Central High School—in Fargo, North Dakota. After leading Fargo High School to championships in 1922 and 1923, he became an assistant coach at the University of North Dakota in 1924. Russness also studied law at North Dakota before transferring to Northwestern University School of Law—now known as Pritzker School of Law—from which he earned a law degree in 1928. At Northwestern, he coached and scouted for the football team. Rusness later worked as a scout for the Philadelphia Eagles of the National Football League (NFL).

Rusness practiced law in Evanston, Illinois. He died there, on October 11, 1967.

== Head coaching record ==
=== Football ===
| Year | Team | Overall | Conference | Standing | Bowl/playoffs |
|---|---|---|---|---|---|
Moorhead Normal (Independent) (1920–1921)
| 1920 | Moorhead Normal | 3–2 | | | |
| 1921 | Moorhead Normal | 3–3 | | | |
| Moorhead Normal: | | 6–5 | | | |
| Total: | | 6–5 | | | |
