= Reseda Charter High School =

Public high school in California, United States

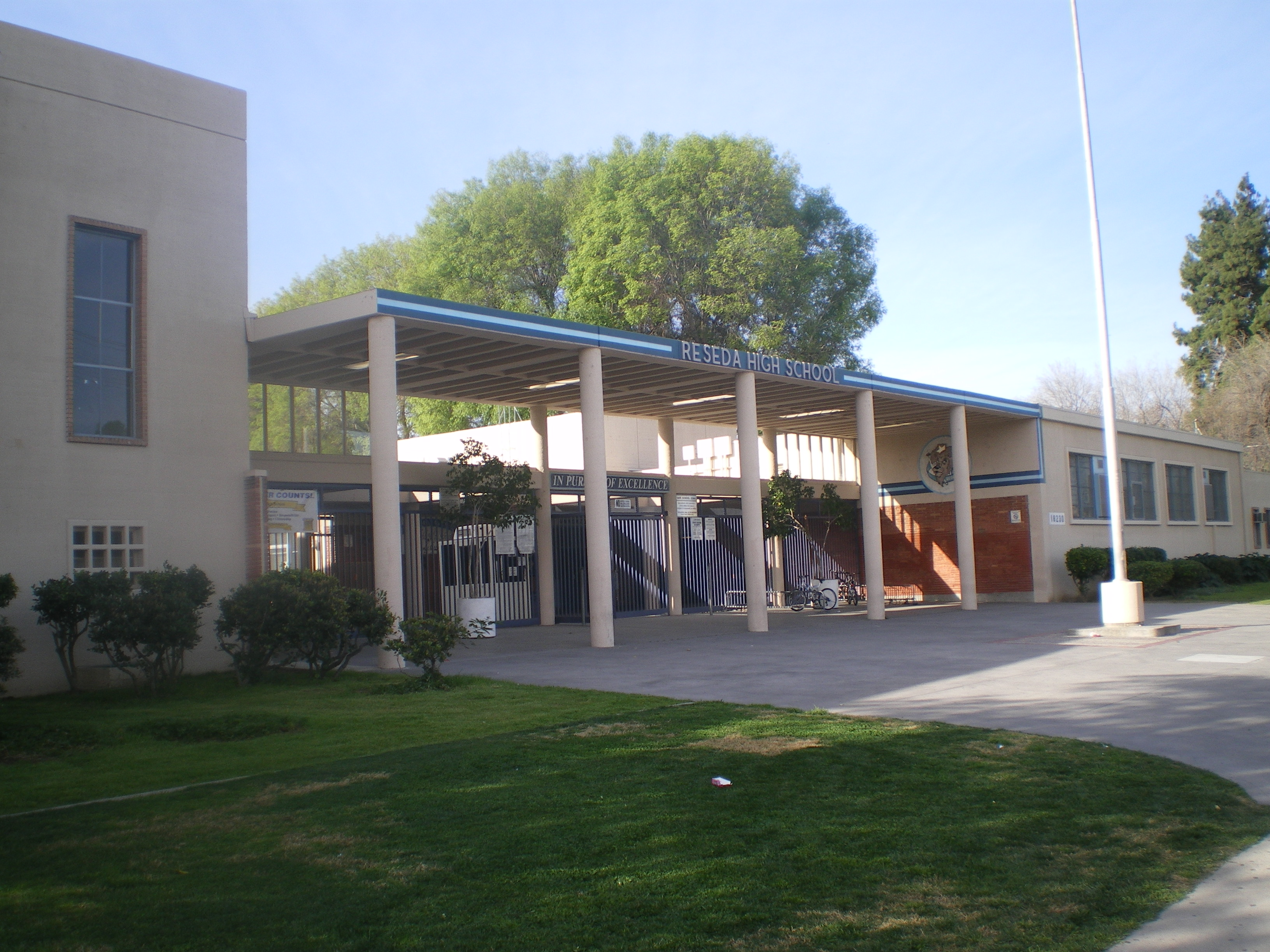

Location
- 18230 Kittridge Street, Reseda, Los Angeles, California 91335; 34°11′N 118°32′W

Information
- Type: Charter
- Established: 1955
- Status: Open
- School district: Los Angeles Unified School District
- Principal: Pia Damonte
- Staff: 78.04 (on an FTE basis)
- Grades: 6-12
- Enrollment: 1,354 (2023–24)
- Student to teacher ratio: 17.35
- Colors: Navy, Columbia blue, White
- Athletics conference: Valley Mission League; CIF Los Angeles City Section
- Mascot: Regent
- Website: Official Website

Reseda Charter High School (RCHS), established in 1955, is located in the Reseda section of the San Fernando Valley region of Los Angeles, California, United States. In the fall of 2018, the school became a charter and is now Reseda Charter High School. In the fall of 2020, the school added middle grades becoming 6-12. It is in the Los Angeles Unified School District.

== History ==
Reseda Charter High was the first complete high school to be built in the San Fernando Valley after World War II. Reseda opened with complete academic and science buildings, a gymnasium, track & field, Industrial shops, including an automotive repair facility. Reseda High School has a three-color system of navy, Columbia blue, and white. It was one of few high schools in the San Fernando Valley to have a complete auditorium when it was built.

It was in the Los Angeles City High School District until 1961 when it merged into LAUSD.

== Academic programs ==
Reseda Charter programs include Charter Academy residential school 6-8 & 9-12, an International Dual Language Center 6-8 & 9-12(Spanish), a School for Advanced Studies 6-8 & 9-12: PLTW Biomedical Science CTE pathway, the Arts, Media & Entertainment Magnet: Film Production and Management CTE Magnet, the Police Academy Magnet CTE Magnet, and the Reseda High School Science Magnet: PLTW Biomedical Science CTE and PLTW Engineering CTE Magnet an award-winning arts program including: animation, marching band, dance, graphic art, jazz band, orchestra, stagecraft, studio art, and theater arts Academic Decathlon program, Navy Junior Reserve Officers' Training Corps, chapter of Health Occupations Students of America, Science Bowl. In addition, Reseda Charter has a competitive flag and drill team performing and competing with the marching band. The Reseda Charter Marching Brigade won 1st place in the LAUSD Band Competition in 2019 and 1st place in the 2019 Granada Hills Christmas Parade. Additionally in 2019, Reseda opened a professional dance CTE pathway led by a working professional dancer.

Reseda Charter has the only robotics program in the San Fernando Valley competing in the FIRST Robotics Competition and was in the 1st place alliance in the spring of 2018 in Pomona, CA.

== Sports ==
Reseda Charter fields teams for boys & girls in football, basketball, cheerleading, soccer, baseball, softball, volleyball, tennis, golf, track & field, cross country, water polo, swimming & wrestling.

== School shooting ==
On February 22, 1993, 15-year-old Robert Heard shot and killed 17-year-old Michael Shean Ensley in a corridor of Reseda High School. Although police declined to characterize the shooting as gang-related, they did say both boys were involved in tagging. Ensley was the younger brother of actress Niecy Nash. Heard was convicted as a juvenile for his crime. In 2017, Heard was charged with second-degree murder for stabbing his wife to death in 2012 during his parole and faced up to life without parole.

The murder prompted LAUSD to install hundreds of metal detectors throughout the school district and a California State Assembly bill was passed allocating $1.5 million to buy metal wanding devices for all secondary schools in the state.

== Notable alumni ==
- Hal Bedsole (1959), former NFL tight end
- Bob Christiansen, former NFL defensive tackle
- Paul Durousseau, serial killer
- Bill Griffeth, (1974) Author and TV news anchor
- Robert Hilburn (1957), former Los Angeles Times music critic
- Randy Kerber, (1976) Award winning pianist, composer
- Greg Lee (1970), former ABA and NBA point guard
- Christine Maggiore, deceased AIDS denialist
- Caroline Menjivar, California state senator
- Jeff "Swampy" Marsh (1978), animator, writer, director, producer, voice actor, and composer. Co-creator of Phineas and Ferb and Milo Murphy's Law
- Jim McGlothlin (1961), former MLB pitcher
- Elizabeth McKenzie, 1976, Author and editor
- Odis McKinney (1974), former NFL cornerback
- Ted Nash, (1977), Grammy winning jazz saxophonist, composer
- Mark Nordquist (1963), former NFL lineman
- Dan Peña (1963) Wall Street as a financial analyst
- Bobby Pfeil, former MLB third baseman
- Leo Rosales (1999), former MLB pitcher
- Brenda Scott, former film and television actress
- Willie Sims, professional soccer player
- Brody Stevens, stand-up comedian and actor
- Mark Summer. (1976), Grammy winning Cellist, composer, former member of the Turtle Island String Quartet
- Bob Swaim (1961), film director
- Michael Tigar, criminal defense lawyer
- Jeff Widener, photographer
- David Wilson, former NFL defensive back
