= 1956 California Golden Bears football team =

American college football season

1956 California Golden Bears football
- Conference: Pacific Coast Conference
- Record: 3–7 (2–5 PCC)
- Head coach: Pappy Waldorf (10th season)
- Home stadium: California Memorial Stadium

1956 Pacific Coast Conference football standings
| | Conf. | | | | | Overall |
| Team | W | | L | | T | W | | L | | T |
|---|---|---|---|---|---|---|---|---|---|---|
| No. 10 Oregon State $ | 6 | – | 1 | – | 1 | 7 | – | 3 | – | 1 |
| No. 18 USC | 5 | – | 2 | – | 0 | 8 | – | 2 | – | 0 |
| UCLA | 5 | – | 2 | – | 0 | 7 | – | 3 | – | 0 |
| Washington | 4 | – | 4 | – | 0 | 5 | – | 5 | – | 0 |
| Oregon | 3 | – | 3 | – | 2 | 4 | – | 4 | – | 2 |
| Stanford | 3 | – | 4 | – | 0 | 4 | – | 6 | – | 0 |
| Washington State | 2 | – | 5 | – | 1 | 3 | – | 6 | – | 1 |
| California | 2 | – | 5 | – | 0 | 3 | – | 7 | – | 0 |
| Idaho | 0 | – | 4 | – | 0 | 4 | – | 5 | – | 0 |
$ – Conference champion; Rankings from AP Poll

The 1956 California Golden Bears football team was an American football team that represented the University of California, Berkeley in the Pacific Coast Conference (PCC) during the 1956 college football season. In their tenth and final year under head coach Pappy Waldorf, the Golden Bears compiled a 3–7 record (2–5 in PCC, eighth) and were outscored 181 to 135. Home games were played on campus at California Memorial Stadium in Berkeley, California.

At the Big Game in Berkeley on November 24, the 14-point underdog Bears upset Stanford 20–18. Waldorf's players knew that it was his last game; following the win, they carried him off the field on their shoulders. He was inducted into the College Football Hall of Fame in 1966.^{[1]}

California's statistical leaders on offense were sophomore quarterback Joe Kapp with 667 passing yards, Herb Jackson with 462 rushing yards, and Norm Becker with 313 receiving yards. Kapp was inducted into the College Football Hall of Fame in 2004.

== Schedule ==
| Date | Opponent | Site | Result | Attendance | Source |
|---|---|---|---|---|---|
| September 22 | Baylor* | California Memorial Stadium; Berkeley, CA | L 6–7 | 36,000 | |
| September 29 | at Illinois* | Memorial Stadium; Champaign, IL | L 20–32 | 54,833 | |
| October 6 | No. 7 Pittsburgh* | California Memorial Stadium; Berkeley, CA | W 14–0 | 31,000 | |
| October 13 | at Oregon State | Parker Stadium; Corvallis, OR | L 13–21 | 14,125 | |
| October 20 | UCLA | California Memorial Stadium; Berkeley, CA (rivalry) | L 20–34 | 48,000 | |
| October 27 | at Washington | Husky Stadium; Seattle, WA | W 16–7 | 31,000 | |
| November 3 | Oregon | California Memorial Stadium; Berkeley, CA | L 6–28 | 32,000 | |
| November 10 | at No. 16 USC | Los Angeles Memorial Coliseum; Los Angeles, CA | L 7–20 | 41,628 | |
| November 17 | Washington State | California Memorial Stadium; Berkeley, CA | L 13–14 | 32,000 | |
| November 24 | Stanford | California Memorial Stadium; Berkeley, CA (Big Game) | W 20–18 | 81,400 | |
*Non-conference game; Rankings from AP Poll released prior to the game; Source:
