= 1956 UCLA Bruins football team =

American college football season

1956 UCLA Bruins football
- Conference: Pacific Coast Conference
- Record: 7–3 (5–2 PCC)
- Head coach: Red Sanders (8th season)
- Offensive scheme: Single-wing
- Home stadium: Los Angeles Memorial Coliseum

1956 Pacific Coast Conference football standings
	Conf.					Overall
Team	W		L		T	W		L		T
No. 10 Oregon State $	6	–	1	–	1	7	–	3	–	1
No. 18 USC	5	–	2	–	0	8	–	2	–	0
UCLA	5	–	2	–	0	7	–	3	–	0
Washington	4	–	4	–	0	5	–	5	–	0
Oregon	3	–	3	–	2	4	–	4	–	2
Stanford	3	–	4	–	0	4	–	6	–	0
Washington State	2	–	5	–	1	3	–	6	–	1
California	2	–	5	–	0	3	–	7	–	0
Idaho	0	–	4	–	0	4	–	5	–	0
$ – Conference champion; Rankings from AP Poll

The 1956 UCLA Bruins football team was an American football team that represented the University of California, Los Angeles in the Pacific Coast Conference (PCC) during the 1956 college football season. In their eighth year under head coach Red Sanders, the Bruins compiled a 7–3 record (5–2 in PCC, third). Entering the season, UCLA had won three consecutive conference titles.

UCLA's offensive leaders were Doug Bradley with 293 passing yards, Barry Billington with 399 rushing yards, and Dick Wallen with 308 receiving yards.

== Schedule ==
Date	Opponent	Rank	Site	Result	Attendance	Source
September 21	Utah*	No. 17	Los Angeles Memorial Coliseum; Los Angeles, CA	W 13–7	37,038	
September 29	at No. 13 Michigan*		Michigan Stadium; Ann Arbor, MI	L 13–42	67,739	
October 5	Oregon		Los Angeles Memorial Coliseum; Los Angeles, CA	W 6–0	32,097	
October 13	Washington State		Los Angeles Memorial Coliseum; Los Angeles, CA	W 28–0	27,192	
October 20	at California		California Memorial Stadium; Berkeley, CA (rivalry)	W 34–20	48,000	
October 27	at Oregon State		Parker Stadium; Corvallis, OR	L 7–21	17,080	
November 3	No. 10 Stanford		Los Angeles Memorial Coliseum; Los Angeles, CA	W 14–13	76,505	
November 10	at Washington	No. 19	Husky Stadium; Seattle, WA	W 13–9	27,500	
November 17	Kansas*		Los Angeles Memorial Coliseum; Los Angeles, CA	W 13–0	21,913	
November 24	USC		Los Angeles Memorial Coliseum; Los Angeles, CA (Victory Bell)	L 7–10	63,709	
*Non-conference game; Rankings from AP Poll released prior to the game; Source:

== Personnel ==
=== Players ===
- Bob Bergdahl
- Barry Billington, fullback
- Don Birren
- Doug Bradley, halfback
- Dick Butler, center
- Jim Dawson, tackle
- Preston Dills, senior
- Dennis Dressel, center, sophomore
- Don Duncan, halfback, sophomore
- Bob Dutcher
- Lou Elias, wingback
- Bob Enger, quarterback, junior
- Steve Gertsman, quarterback
- Edison Griffin, safety/halfback junior
- Joe Harper, guard
- Esker Harris, guard
- Chuck Holloway, halfback
- Bill Leeka, sophomore
- Don Long
- Jim Matheny, junior
- Pete O'Garro, end
- Phil Parslow, halfback
- Jerry Penner, tackle
- Dan Peterson
- Dave Peterson, fullback
- Pat Pinkston, end
- Don Shinnick
- Hal Smith, junior
- Dick Wallen, end
- Clint Whitfield, guard, sophomore
- Kirk Wilson, punter
- Gary Yurosek, tackle

=== Coaching staff ===
- Head coach - Red Sanders
- Assistant coaches - Bill Barns, Deke Brackett, Ray Nagle, George Dickerson, Jim Myers, Johnny Johnson

=== Other personnel ===
- Managers - Ted Manos, Frances Helstein, Jim Walker, Ted Dallas, and Barry Snooke
- Head trainer - Ducky Drake
