= 1956 Indiana Hoosiers football team =

American college football season

1956 Indiana Hoosiers football
- Conference: Big Ten Conference
- Record: 3–6 (1–5 Big Ten)
- Head coach: Bernie Crimmins (5th season)
- MVP: Bob Fee
- Captain: Gene Cichowski
- Home stadium: Memorial Stadium

1956 Big Ten Conference football standings
	Conf.					Overall
Team	W		L		T	W		L		T
No. 3 Iowa $	5	–	1	–	0	9	–	1	–	0
No. 7 Michigan	5	–	2	–	0	7	–	2	–	0
No. 12 Minnesota	4	–	1	–	2	6	–	1	–	2
No. 9 Michigan State	4	–	2	–	0	7	–	2	–	0
No. 15 Ohio State	4	–	2	–	0	6	–	3	–	0
Northwestern	3	–	3	–	1	4	–	4	–	1
Purdue	1	–	4	–	2	3	–	4	–	2
Illinois	1	–	4	–	2	2	–	5	–	2
Wisconsin	0	–	4	–	3	1	–	5	–	3
Indiana	1	–	5	–	0	3	–	6	–	0
$ – Conference champion; Rankings from AP Poll

The 1956 Indiana Hoosiers football team was an American football team that represented the Indiana Hoosiers in the 1956 Big Ten Conference football season. The Hoosiers played their home games at Memorial Stadium in Bloomington, Indiana. The team was coached by Bernie Crimmins, in his fifth and final year as head coach of the Hoosiers. On November 28, 1956, Crimmins, at age 37, resigned as Indiana's head football coach. He had compiled a 13–32 record and was unable to produce a winning team in five years in the position.

The team's statistical leaders included Steve Filipowski with 391 passing yards, Bob Fee with 621 rushing yards, and Brad Bomba with 407 receiving yards. Bomba's receiving yardage also led the Big Ten.

== Schedule ==
Date	Opponent	Site	Result	Attendance
September 29	Iowa	Memorial Stadium; Bloomington, IN	L 0–27	25,000
October 6	at No. 17 Notre Dame*	Notre Dame Stadium; Notre Dame, IN	L 6–20	58,372
October 13	at No. 2 Michigan State	Macklin Stadium; East Lansing, MI (rivalry)	L 6–53	58,858
October 20	at Nebraska*	Memorial Stadium; Lincoln, NE	W 19–14	37,527
October 27	Northwestern	Memorial Stadium; Bloomington, IN	W 19–13	23,000
November 3	Marquette*	Memorial Stadium; Bloomington, IN	W 19–13	21,000
November 10	at No. 7 Ohio State	Ohio Stadium; Columbus, OH	L 14–35	82,073
November 17	at No. 10 Michigan	Michigan Stadium; Ann Arbor, MI	L 26–49	58,515
November 24	at Purdue	Ross–Ade Stadium; West Lafayette, IN (Old Oaken Bucket)	L 20–39	42,856
*Non-conference game; Rankings from AP Poll released prior to the game

== Game summaries ==
On September 29, 1956, Iowa defeated Indiana, 27–0, before a crowd of 25,000 at Memorial Stadium in Bloomington, Indiana, for the first conference game of the 1956 season. Iowa scored two touchdowns in the first quarter off an Indiana fumble and an interception. Iowa rushed for 242 yards to 76 yards for Indiana.

On October 6, Notre Dame (ranked No. 17 in the AP Poll) defeated Indiana, 20–6, before a crowd of 58,372 at Notre Dame Stadium in South Bend, Indiana.

On October 13, Michigan State (ranked No. 2 in the AP Poll) defeated Indiana, 53–6, before a crowd of 58,858 at Macklin Stadium in East Lansing, Michigan. The Spartans gained 264 rushing yards and 204 passing yards. Clarence Peaks also returned a punt 63 yards for a touchdown. Michigan State played backups for much of the second half with a total of 50 Spartans seeing game action. The outcome was Indiana's worst defeat since 1948.

On October 20, Indiana defeated Nebraska, 19–14, before a crowd of 38,000 at Memorial Stadium in Lincoln, Nebraska. Nebraska led, 14–0, at halftime, but Indiana rallied for two touchdowns in the fourth quarter. The result was Indiana's first win of the season. Brad Bomba caught six passes in the game.

On October 27, Indiana defeated Northwestern, 19–13, before a homecoming crowd of 23,000 at Memorial Stadium in Bloomington. The game was tied, 13–13, at halftime. Indiana intercepted a Northwestern pass with four minutes remaining to set up the winning touchdown.

On November 3, Indiana defeated Marquette, 19–13, before a crowd of approximately 21,000 at Memorial Stadium in Bloomington. In the fourth quarter, Indiana's Arnold Steeves recovered a fumble at Marquette's 43-yard line to set up the winning touchdown.

On November 10, Ohio State (ranked No. 7 in the AP Poll) defeated Indiana, 35–14, before a crowd of 82,073 at Ohio Stadium in Columbus. The victory was Ohio State's 17th in a row against conference opponents, setting a new conference record. The Buckeyes also broke the Big Ten single-game record with 465 rushing yards against the Hoosiers.

On November 17, Michigan defeated Indiana, 49–26, before a crowd of 58,515 at Michigan Stadium in Ann Arbor. Michigan led, 35–0, at halftime and gained for 427 yards (275 rushing, 142 passing) in the game. Michigan's Terry Barr scored three touchdowns in the game.

On November 24, in the annual battle for the Old Oaken Bucket, Purdue defeated Indiana, 39–20, at Ross–Ade Stadium in Lafayette, Indiana. In his final college game, Purdue quarterback Len Dawson threw two touchdown passes, both caught by end Lamar Lundy. Mel Dillard rushed for 130 yards and three touchdowns in the game and a conference high 873 yards for the season. The game proved to be a battle for last place in the conference, with Purdue finishing in ninth place and Indiana in tenth and last place.

== 1957 NFL draft ==
Player	Position	Round	Pick	NFL club
Milt Campbell	Back	5	53	Cleveland Browns
Joe Amstutz	Center	6	63	Cleveland Browns
Bob Fee	Back	14	166	Chicago Cardinals
Brad Bomba	End	15	177	Washington Redskins
Gene Cichowski	Quarterback	21	246	Pittsburgh Steelers
