= 1956 Illinois Fighting Illini football team =

American college football season

1956 Illinois Fighting Illini football
- Conference: Big Ten Conference
- Record: 2–5–2 (1–4–2 Big Ten)
- Head coach: Ray Eliot (15th season)
- MVP: Dave Walker
- Captain: James Minor
- Home stadium: Memorial Stadium

1956 Big Ten Conference football standings
	Conf.					Overall
Team	W		L		T	W		L		T
No. 3 Iowa $	5	–	1	–	0	9	–	1	–	0
No. 7 Michigan	5	–	2	–	0	7	–	2	–	0
No. 12 Minnesota	4	–	1	–	2	6	–	1	–	2
No. 9 Michigan State	4	–	2	–	0	7	–	2	–	0
No. 15 Ohio State	4	–	2	–	0	6	–	3	–	0
Northwestern	3	–	3	–	1	4	–	4	–	1
Purdue	1	–	4	–	2	3	–	4	–	2
Illinois	1	–	4	–	2	2	–	5	–	2
Wisconsin	0	–	4	–	3	1	–	5	–	3
Indiana	1	–	5	–	0	3	–	6	–	0
$ – Conference champion; Rankings from AP Poll

The 1956 Illinois Fighting Illini football team was an American football team that represented the University of Illinois as a member of the Big Ten Conference during the 1956 Big Ten season. In their 15th year under head coach Ray Eliot, the Fighting Illini compiled a 2–5–2 record (1–4–2 in conference games), tied for seventh place in the Big Ten, and were outscored by a total of 154 to 124.

The team's statistical leaders included Miles Stout (278 passing yards, 51.3% completion rate) and halfback Abe Woodson (599 rushing yards, 5.4 yards per rushing carry, 12 receptions, 257 receiving yards). Woodson received first-team honors on the 1956 All-Big Ten Conference football team.

The team played its home games at Memorial Stadium in Champaign, Illinois.

== Schedule ==
Date	Opponent	Rank	Site	Result	Attendance
September 29	California*		Memorial Stadium; Champaign, IL	W 32–20	54,833
October 6	at Washington*	No. 13	Husky Stadium; Seattle, WA	L 13–28	36,261
October 13	No. 5 Ohio State		Memorial Stadium; Champaign, IL (Illibuck)	L 6–26	58,247
October 20	at Minnesota		Memorial Stadium; Minneapolis, MN	L 13–16	62,614
October 27	No. 1 Michigan State		Memorial Stadium; Champaign, IL	W 20–13	56,431
November 3	at Purdue		Ross–Ade Stadium; West Lafayette, IN (rivalry)	T 7–7	46,166
November 10	at No. 10 Michigan		Michigan Stadium; Ann Arbor, MI (rivalry)	L 7–17	75,735
November 17	Wisconsin		Memorial Stadium; Champaign, IL	T 13–13	52,858
November 24	at Northwestern		Dyche Stadium; Evanston, IL (rivalry)	L 13–14	40,000
*Non-conference game; Rankings from AP Poll released prior to the game

== Game summaries ==
On September 29, 1956, Illinois defeated California, 32–20, before a crowd of 54,833 at Memorial Stadium in Champaign, Illinois. The attendance was a Memorial Stadium record for an opening game. California took a 20–0 lead, but Illinois scored four touchdowns in the third quarter over a span of six minutes and 36 seconds. Abe Woodson recovered Ray Nitschke's fumble for Illinois' first touchdown.

On October 6, Washington defeated Illinois, 28–13, before a crowd of 36,261 at Husky Stadium in Seattle. On the opening series of the game, Illinois drove to Washington's two yard line but quarterback Hiles Stout fumbled. Washington recovered the ball, and Dean Derby ran 92 yards for a touchdown.

On October 13, Ohio State (ranked No. 5 at the AP Poll) defeated Illinois, 26–6, before a crowd of 58,247 at Memorial Stadium in Champaign. Ohio State rushed for 307 yards, aided by the blocking of guard Jim Parker who was selected as the team's most valuable player for the 1956 season. Parker also played on defense and recovered a fumble at the Illinois 10-yard line to set up a touchdown. Quarterback Frank Ellwood rushed for two touchdowns and threw a touchdown pass to Jim Roseboro. It was on the opening kickoff of this game that Illinois linebacker/backup quarterback (and future Green Bay Packers star) Ray Nitschke developed his famous toothless grin when he took a Buckeye helmet in the mouth. Nitschke, who never wore a face guard on his helmet in college, lost his four top front teeth as a result of the play.

On October 20, Minnesota defeated Illinois, 16–13, before a crowd of 63,037 at Memorial Stadium in Minneapolis. Dick Borstad kicked a field goal with two minutes remaining to put the Golden Gophers in the lead.

On October 27, Illinois upset Michigan State, 20–13, before a homecoming crowd of 71,119 at Memorial Stadium in Champaign. Michigan State was ranked No. 1 before the game and had its national championship hopes, and a 12-game winning streak, dashed by the defeat. The Spartans led, 13–0, at halftime, but Abe Woodson, the Big Ten's indoor sprint champion, led the Illini to 20 unanswered points in the second half. Woodson scored all three Illinois touchdowns: a 70-yard touchdown run, an 82-touchdown reception, and a short touchdown run. Woodson had 116 rushing yards and total gains of 198 yards.

On November 3, Illinois and Purdue played to a 7–7 tie before a homecoming crowd of 46,166 at Ross–Ade Stadium in West Lafayette.

On November 10, Michigan (ranked No. 10 in the AP Poll) defeated Illinois, 17–7, before a crowd of 75,470 at Michigan Stadium. Illinois scored a touchdown on its first possession but was held scoreless for the remainder of the game. Michigan came back with rushing touchdowns by Jim Pace and Jim Byers and a field goal by Ron Kramer. Michigan rushed for 328 yards, including 120 yards by Jim Pace.

On November 17, Illinois and Wisconsin played to a 13–13 tie before a crowd of 52,858 at Memorial Stadium in Champaign. Illinois led 13–6 at halftime. With slightly more than three minutes left in the game, Wisconsin end Sidney Williams threw a 34-yard pass to Danny Lewis on the nine-yard line, setting up a touchdown run on the next play. Williams' pass was his first of the season.

On November 24, in the annual Illinois–Northwestern football rivalry game, Northwestern defeated Illinois, 14–13, before a crowd of 40,000 at Dyche Stadium in Evanston. Bob McKelver kicked two extra points for Northwestern, which proved to be the difference in a game in which each team scored two touchdowns.

== Awards and statistics ==
Halfback Abe Woodson was selected as a first-team All-Big Ten player by both the Associated Press and United Press. Woodson was drafted in the second round, 15th overall pick, of the 1957 NFL draft.

Guard Dave Walker was selected as the team's most valuable player.

Illinois' statistical leaders in 1956 included Hiles Stout with 278 passing yards, Abe Woodson with 599 rushing yards, and Woodson with 257 receiving yards.
