= 1956 Northwestern Wildcats football team =

American college football season

1956 Northwestern Wildcats football
- Conference: Big Ten Conference
- Record: 4–4–1 (3–3–1 Big Ten)
- Head coach: Ara Parseghian (1st season)
- MVP: Al Viola
- Captain: Ted Ringer
- Home stadium: Dyche Stadium

1956 Big Ten Conference football standings
	Conf.					Overall
Team	W		L		T	W		L		T
No. 3 Iowa $	5	–	1	–	0	9	–	1	–	0
No. 7 Michigan	5	–	2	–	0	7	–	2	–	0
No. 12 Minnesota	4	–	1	–	2	6	–	1	–	2
No. 9 Michigan State	4	–	2	–	0	7	–	2	–	0
No. 15 Ohio State	4	–	2	–	0	6	–	3	–	0
Northwestern	3	–	3	–	1	4	–	4	–	1
Purdue	1	–	4	–	2	3	–	4	–	2
Illinois	1	–	4	–	2	2	–	5	–	2
Wisconsin	0	–	4	–	3	1	–	5	–	3
Indiana	1	–	5	–	0	3	–	6	–	0
$ – Conference champion; Rankings from AP Poll

The 1956 Northwestern Wildcats team was an American football team that represented Northwestern University during the 1956 Big Ten Conference football season. In their first year under head coach Ara Parseghian, the Wildcats compiled a 4–4–1 record (3–1–1 against Big Ten Conference opponents), finished in sixth place in the Big Ten, and were outscored by their opponents by a combined total of 112 to 107.

== Schedule ==
Date	Opponent	Site	Result	Attendance	Source
September 29	Iowa State*	Dyche Stadium; Evanston, IL	W 14–13	31,108	
October 6	Tulane*	Dyche Stadium; Evanston, IL	L 13–20	32,000	
October 13	at No. 17 Minnesota	Memorial Stadium; Minneapolis, MN	T 0–0	62,006	
October 20	at No. 8 Michigan	Michigan Stadium; Ann Arbor, MI (rivalry)	L 20–34	81,718	
October 27	at Indiana	Memorial Stadium; Bloomington, IN	L 13–19	23,000	
November 3	No. 6 Ohio State	Dyche Stadium; Evanston, IL	L 2–6	42,000	
November 10	at Wisconsin	Camp Randall Stadium; Madison, WI	W 17–7	54,645	
November 17	Purdue	Dyche Stadium; Evanston, IL	W 14–0	32,000	
November 24	Illinois	Dyche Stadium; Evanston, IL (rivalry)	W 14–13	40,000	
*Non-conference game; Rankings from AP Poll released prior to the game

== Preseason ==
On December 9, 1955, Purdue head coach Stu Holcomb resigned his position and signed a five-year contract as the athletic director at Northwestern. Three days later, Holcomb fired Northwestern head coach Lou Saban and his entire staff of assistant coaches. On December 16, Holcomb announced that he had signed Miami (OH) head coach Ara Parseghian to a three-year contract as the Wildcats' new head coach. Parseghian had led the 1955 Miami Redskins football team to a perfect 9–0 record.

== Game summaries ==
On September 29, 1956, Northwestern defeated Iowa State, 14–13, before a crowd of 38,000 at Dyche Stadium in Evanston, Illinois. With six seconds remaining in the game and Iowa State driving deep into Northwestern territory, Chuck Latting fumbled at the seven-yard line.

On October 6, Northwestern lost to Tulane, 20–13, before a crowd of 32,000 at Dyche Stadium in Evanston. Tulane scored all 20 of its points in a wild second quarter. Northwestern's Bob McKelver rushed for 116 net yards on 12 carries.

On October 13, Northwestern and Minnesota (ranked No. 17 in the AP Poll) played to a scoreless tie in front of a crowd of 62,006 at Memorial Stadium in Minneapolis. Minnesota had been a 14-point favorite and moved the ball well, out-gaining Northwestern 271 yards to 142. However, the Gophers were unable to score, turning the ball over on fumbles three times, including one at Northwestern's goal line. Heavy rain slowed the teams in the second half.

On October 20, Michigan (ranked No. 8 in the AP Poll) defeated Northwestern, 34–20, before a Band Day crowd of 81,227 at Michigan Stadium in Ann Arbor. Fullback John Herrnstein scored three touchdowns for Michigan.

On October 27, Indiana defeated Northwestern, 19–13, before a homecoming crowd of 23,000 at Memorial Stadium in Bloomington. The game was tied, 13–13, at halftime. Indiana intercepted a Northwestern pass with four minutes remaining to set up the winning touchdown.

On November 3, Ohio State (ranked No. 6 in the AP Poll) defeated Northwestern, 6–2, before a homecoming crowd of 42,000 at Dyche Stadium in Evanston. Northwestern guard Al Viola blocked a punt in the first quarter that rolled out of the end zone for a safety. With 16 seconds left in the first half, Ellwood threw a seven-yard touchdown pass to Leo Brown.

On November 10, Northwestern defeated Wisconsin, 17–7, before a homecoming crowd of 54,645 spectators at Camp Randall Stadium in Madison. The attendance was the highest in the history of Camp Randall Stadium to that point. Northwestern's first touchdown of the game was scored by center Ted Ringer when he recovered a loose ball in the end zone following a fumble by teammate Wilmer Fowler. The outcome was Northwestern's first conference victory under Ara Parseghian.

On November 17, Northwestern defeated Purdue, 14–0, before a crowd of 32,000 at Dyche Stadium in Evanston. Northwestern recovered five of seven Purdue fumbles and intercepted three passes. Four of the fumbles were recovered by Al Viola. After the game, Edward Prell wrote in the Chicago Tribune that Northwestern had in 1956 been "brought back to life by its new 33 year old coach, Ara Parseghian."

On November 24, in the annual Illinois–Northwestern football rivalry game, Northwestern defeated Illinois, 14–13, before a crowd of 40,000 at Dyche Stadium in Evanston. Bob McKelver kicked two extra points for Northwestern, which proved to be the difference in a game in which each team scored two touchdowns.

== Awards ==
Two Northwestern players were picked by the Associated Press (AP) and/or the United Press (UP) as first-team players on the 1956 All-Big Ten Conference football team. They were:

Position	Name	Team	Selectors
Halfback	Bob McKelver	Northwestern	AP
Guard	Al Viola	Northwestern	UP
