= 1956 Purdue Boilermakers football team =

American college football season

1956 Purdue Boilermakers football
- Conference: Big Ten Conference
- Record: 3–4–2 (1–4–2 Big Ten)
- Head coach: Jack Mollenkopf (1st season)
- MVP: Lamar Lundy
- Captains: Bob Clasey; Len Dawson; Lamar Lundy
- Home stadium: Ross–Ade Stadium

1956 Big Ten Conference football standings
	Conf.					Overall
Team	W		L		T	W		L		T
No. 3 Iowa $	5	–	1	–	0	9	–	1	–	0
No. 7 Michigan	5	–	2	–	0	7	–	2	–	0
No. 12 Minnesota	4	–	1	–	2	6	–	1	–	2
No. 9 Michigan State	4	–	2	–	0	7	–	2	–	0
No. 15 Ohio State	4	–	2	–	0	6	–	3	–	0
Northwestern	3	–	3	–	1	4	–	4	–	1
Purdue	1	–	4	–	2	3	–	4	–	2
Illinois	1	–	4	–	2	2	–	5	–	2
Wisconsin	0	–	4	–	3	1	–	5	–	3
Indiana	1	–	5	–	0	3	–	6	–	0
$ – Conference champion; Rankings from AP Poll

The 1956 Purdue Boilermakers football team was an American football team that represented Purdue University during the 1956 Big Ten Conference football season. In their first year under head coach Jack Mollenkopf, the Boilermakers compiled a 3–4–2 record, finished in a tie for seventh place in the Big Ten Conference with a 1–4–2 record against conference opponents, and outscored opponents by a total of 139 to 122.

Notable players on the 1956 Purdue team include quarterback Len Dawson, fullback Mel Dillard, and end Lamar Lundy.

== Schedule ==
Date	Opponent	Rank	Site	Result	Attendance
September 29	Missouri*		Ross–Ade Stadium; West Lafayette, IN	W 16–7	46,455
October 6	at Minnesota		Memorial Stadium; Minneapolis, MN	L 14–21	58,660
October 13	at No. 18 Notre Dame*		Notre Dame Stadium; Notre Dame, IN (rivalry)	W 28–14	58,778
October 20	at Wisconsin	No. 17	Camp Randall Stadium; Madison, WI	T 6–6	53,044
October 27	No. 12 Iowa		Ross–Ade Stadium; West Lafayette, IN	L 20–21	41,415
November 3	Illinois^{†}		Ross–Ade Stadium; West Lafayette, IN (rivalry)	T 7–7	46,166
November 10	at No. 4 Michigan State		Macklin Stadium; East Lansing, MI	L 9–12	56,431
November 17	at Northwestern		Dyche Stadium; Evanston, IL	L 0–14	32,000
November 24	Indiana		Ross–Ade Stadium; West Lafayette, IN (Old Oaken Bucket)	W 39–20	42,856
*Non-conference game; ^{†}Homecoming; Rankings from AP Poll released prior to the game

== Preseason ==
On December 9, 1955, Purdue head coach Stu Holcomb resigned his position and signed a five-year contract as the athletic director at Northwestern. Four days later, Purdue president Frederick L. Hovde announced that Holcomb's top assistant, Jack Mollenkopf, had been signed to a three-year contract as Purdue's head football coach.

== Game summaries ==
=== Missouri ===
In the first game under head coach Mollenkopf, Purdue defeated Missouri, 16–7, before a crowd of 46,455 at Ross–Ade Stadium in Lafayette, Indiana. Purdue halfback Tom Fletcher rushed for 154 yards on 22 carries, including a 35-yard touchdown run. Purdue quarterback Len Dawson completed eight of 17 passes for 118 yards.

=== Minnesota ===
Minnesota defeated Purdue, 21–14, before a crowd of 59,314 at Memorial Stadium in Minneapolis. Fullback Dick Borstad scored two Minnesota touchdowns on runs of 23 yards and one yard. Purdue quarterback Len Dawson completed seven of 13 passes for 102 yards and three interceptions. Mel Dillard rushed for 120 yards on 25 carries.

=== Notre Dame ===
Purdue defeated Notre Dame (ranked No. 18 in the AP Poll), 28–14, before a crowd of 58,778 at Notre Dame Stadium in South Bend. Purdue back Mel Dillard rushed for 142 yards and two touchdowns on 29 carries.

=== Wisconsin ===
Purdue and Wisconsin played to a 6–6 tie before a Dad's Day crowd of 53,094 at Camp Randall Stadium in Madison. Danny Lewis ran 30 yards for a Wisconsin touchdown in the first quarter, and Len Dawson threw a touchdown pass to Lamar Lundy in the second quarter. Neither team converted its extra point.

=== Iowa ===
Iowa (ranked No. 12 in the AP Poll) defeated Purdue, 21–20, before a crowd of 41,415 at Ross-Ade Stadium in West Lafayette. Purdue quarterback Len Dawson threw two touchdown passes, and Mel Dillard ran for a third. Iowa also scored three touchdowns, with the difference being a missed extra point. Purdue drove into Iowa territory late in the game, but Purdue fumbled at the 25-yard line with a minute and a half remaining in the game.

=== Illinois ===
Illinois and Purdue played to a 7–7 tie before a homecoming crowd of 46,166 at Ross–Ade Stadium in West Lafayette.

=== Michigan State ===
Michigan State (ranked No. 4 in the AP Poll) defeated Purdue, 12–9, before a crowd of 56,431 at Macklin Stadium in East Lansing. Purdue was a three touchdown underdog without Len Dawson but scored on a touchdown run by Mel Dillard and a safety triggered by Fletcher tackling Martin in the end zone. Michigan State scored two touchdowns, a 27-yard pass from Jim Ninowski to Harold Dukes, and a fumble recovery by Tony Kolodziej in Purdue's end zone.

=== Northwestern ===
Northwestern defeated Purdue, 14–0, before a crowd of 32,000 at Dyche Stadium in Evanston. Northwestern recovered five of seven Purdue fumbles and intercepted three passes. Four of the fumbles were recovered by Al Viola. After the game, Edward Prell wrote in the Chicago Tribune that Northwestern had in 1956 been "brought back to life by its new 33 year old coach, Ara Parseghian."

=== Indiana ===
In the annual battle for the Old Oaken Bucket, Purdue defeated Indiana, 39–20, at Ross-Ade Stadium in Lafayette, Indiana. In his final college game, Purdue quarterback Len Dawson threw two touchdown passes, both caught by end Lamar Lundy. Mel Dillard rushed for 130 yards (on 24 carries) and three touchdowns in the game and a conference high 873 yards for the season. The game proved to be a battle for last place in the conference, with Purdue finishing in ninth place and Indiana in tenth and last place.

== Roster ==
1956 Purdue Boilermakers football team roster
Players
Coaches
Offense

Pos.	#	Name	Class
QB	16	Len Dawson	Sr
FB		Mel Dillard
E		Lamar Lundy

Defense

Pos.	#	Name	Class

Special teams

Pos.	#	Name	Class

Head coach

- Jack Mollenkopf

Coordinators/assistant coaches

Legend

- (C) Team captain
- (S) Suspended
- (I) Ineligible
- Injured
- Redshirt

== Awards and statistics ==
Purdue fullback Mel Dillard was recognized by both the Associated Press and the United Press as a first-team player on the 1956 All-Big Ten Conference football team.

Purdue players led the Big Ten in rushing yards, total offense, and passing yards. Dillard led the conference with 873 rushing yards and 902 yards of total offense. Quarterback Len Dawson led the conference with 856 passing yards. Lamar Lundy ranked fifth in the Big Ten with 248 receiving yards.

== 1957 NFL draft ==
The following Purdue players were among the first 100 picks in the 1957 NFL draft:

Rnd.	Pick No.	NFL team	Player	Pos.	College	Conf.	Notes
1	5	Pittsburgh Steelers	Len Dawson^{‡}^{†}	QB			
4	47	Los Angeles Rams	Lamar Lundy ^{†}	E			
