= 1956 Ohio State Buckeyes football team =

American college football season

1956 Ohio State Buckeyes football
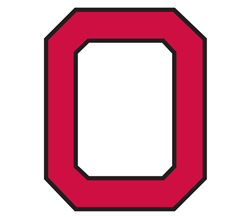
- Conference: Big Ten Conference

Ranking
- AP: No. 15
- Record: 6–3 (4–2 Big Ten)
- Head coach: Woody Hayes (6th season)
- MVP: Jim Parker
- Captains: Frank Ellwood; Paul Michael
- Home stadium: Ohio Stadium

1956 Big Ten Conference football standings
	Conf.					Overall
Team	W		L		T	W		L		T
No. 3 Iowa $	5	–	1	–	0	9	–	1	–	0
No. 7 Michigan	5	–	2	–	0	7	–	2	–	0
No. 12 Minnesota	4	–	1	–	2	6	–	1	–	2
No. 9 Michigan State	4	–	2	–	0	7	–	2	–	0
No. 15 Ohio State	4	–	2	–	0	6	–	3	–	0
Northwestern	3	–	3	–	1	4	–	4	–	1
Purdue	1	–	4	–	2	3	–	4	–	2
Illinois	1	–	4	–	2	2	–	5	–	2
Wisconsin	0	–	4	–	3	1	–	5	–	3
Indiana	1	–	5	–	0	3	–	6	–	0
$ – Conference champion; Rankings from AP Poll

The 1956 Ohio State Buckeyes football team was an American football team that represented the Ohio State University as a member of the Big Ten Conference during the 1956 Big Ten season. In their sixth season under head coach Woody Hayes, the Buckeyes compiled a 6–3 record (4–2 in conference games), tied for fourth place in the Big Ten, and outscored opponents by a total of 160 to 81. They were ranked as high as No. 4 during the season, but they lost the final two games of the season against No. 7 Iowa and No. 9 Michigan.

The team's statistical leaders included Don Clark with 88 passing yards, Clark with 797 rushing yards, Clark with 885 yards of total offense (second best in the Big Ten), and Leo Brown with 151 receiving yards.

== Schedule ==
Date	Opponent	Rank	Site	Result	Attendance
September 29	Nebraska*	No. 8	Ohio Stadium; Columbus, OH	W 34–7	82,153
October 6	Stanford*	No. 4	Ohio Stadium; Columbus, OH	W 32–20	82,881
October 13	at Illinois	No. 5	Memorial Stadium; Champaign, IL (Illibuck)	W 26–6	58,247
October 20	Penn State*	No. 5	Ohio Stadium; Columbus, OH (rivalry)	L 6–7	82,584
October 27	Wisconsin	No. 9	Ohio Stadium; Columbus, OH	W 21–0	82,661
November 3	at Northwestern	No. 6	Dyche Stadium; Evanston, IL	W 6–2	42,000
November 10	Indiana	No. 7	Ohio Stadium; Columbus, OH	W 35–14	82,073
November 17	at No. 7 Iowa	No. 6	Iowa Stadium; Iowa City, IA	L 0–6	57,732
November 24	No. 9 Michigan	No. 12	Ohio Stadium; Columbus, OH (rivalry)	L 0–19	82,223
*Non-conference game; Rankings from AP Poll released prior to the game

== Preseason ==
In the final AP Poll of the 1955 season, Ohio State was ranked No. 5. In the 1956 pre-season AP Poll, Ohio State remained ranked No. 5.

In the spring of 1956, the Big Ten conducted an investigation into allegations that Ohio State coach Woody Hayes had provided financial assistance to players in violation of conference rule. Hayes admitted that he had loaned money to players but refused to provide an accounting of the loans. The investigation also discovered a "serious irregularity" in Ohio State's off-campus work program. In April 1956, the conference placed Ohio State on probation for one year and declared the football team ineligible to play in the 1957 Rose Bowl.

== Game summaries ==
On September 29, 1956, Ohio State (ranked No. 8 in the AP Poll) defeated Nebraska, 34–7, before a crowd of 82,153 at Ohio Stadium in Columbus, Ohio. The crowd was the largest for an opening game in Ohio State history to that point. The Buckeyes rushed for 416 yards in the game. Ohio halfback Don Clark scored two touchdowns on runs of 35 and 38 yards.

On October 6, Ohio State (ranked No. 4 in the AP Poll) defeated Stanford, 32–20. The crowd of 82,881 was the largest to that point to see a game at Ohio Stadium. Stanford quarterback John Brodie completed 21 of 35 passes for 256 yards and two touchdowns. Ohio State gained 302 of its 320 yards on the ground. In the fourth quarter, Don Clark ran for a touchdown and threw an 18-yard touchdown pass to Jim Roseboro to break a 20–20 tie.

On October 13, Ohio State (ranked No. 5 at the AP Poll) defeated Illinois, 26–6, before a crowd of 58,247 at Memorial Stadium in Champaign. Ohio State rushed for 307 yards, aided by the blocking of guard Jim Parker who was selected as the team's most valuable player for the 1956 season. Parker also played on defense and recovered a fumble at the Illinois 10-yard line to set up a touchdown. Quarterback Frank Ellwood rushed for two touchdowns and threw a touchdown pass to Jim Roseboro.

On October 20, Ohio State (ranked No. 5 in the AP Poll) lost to Penn State, 7–6, before a crowd of 82,584 at Ohio Stadium in Columbus. Neither team scored through the first three quarters. Penn State's Bruce Gilmore scored on a short run in the fourth quarter, and Milt Plum kicked the extra point. Later in the quarter, Don Clark scored for Ohio State on a short touchdown run, but Frank Kremblas' kick for extra point went wide of the goalpost.

On October 27, Ohio State defeated Wisconsin, 21–0, before a crowd of 82,661 at Ohio Stadium in Columbus. The victory was Ohio State's 16th in a row against a Big Ten opponent, tying a conference opponent.

On November 3, Ohio State (ranked No. 6 in the AP Poll) defeated Northwestern, 6–2, before a homecoming crowd of 42,000 at Dyche Stadium in Evanston. Northwestern guard Al Viola blocked a punt in the first quarter that rolled out of the end zone for a safety. With 16 seconds left in the first half, Ellwood threw a seven-yard touchdown pass to Leo Brown.

On November 10, Ohio State (ranked No. 7 in the AP Poll) defeated Indiana, 35–14, before a crowd of 82,073 at Ohio Stadium in Columbus. The victory was Ohio State's 17th in a row against conference opponents, setting a new conference record. The Buckeyes also broke the Big Ten single-game record with 465 rushing yards against the Hoosiers.

On November 17, Iowa (ranked No. 7 in the AP Poll) defeated Ohio State (ranked No. 6), 6–0, before a crowd of 57,732 at Iowa Stadium. Ohio State went into the game with the second best rushing attack in the country but were held to 147 rushing yards, their lowest rushing yardage total in two years. The result broke Ohio State's winning streak of 17 games against conference opponents and clinched for Iowa the conference championship and a berth in the Rose Bowl. After time expired, Iowa fans hauled down the goal posts and paraded through Iowa City.

On November 24, in the annual Michigan–Ohio State football rivalry game, Michigan (ranked No. 9 in the AP Poll) defeated Ohio State (ranked No. 12), 19–0, before a crowd of 82,223 at Ohio Stadium. The loss deprived Ohio State of a share of its third consecutive Big Ten title and pushed Michigan to second in the conference standing. Terry Barr, playing in his last game for Michigan, scored two touchdowns.

=== Nebraska ===
Team Statistics
Statistic	Ohio State	Nebraska
Pass Atts.	6	11
Pass Comps.	2	5
Pass Yards	62	68
Yds./Pass	31.0	13.8
Rush Atts.	66	51
Rush Yards	416	185
Yds./Rush	6.3	3.6
Total Yards	478	253
Fumbles Lost	0	2
Interceptions	0	3
Total Turnovers	0	5

Team	1	2	3	4	Total
Nebraska	0	0	7	0	7
• Ohio St	13	14	0	7	34

- Date: September 29
- Location: Ohio Stadium
- Game attendance: 82,153

=== Stanford ===
Team Statistics
Statistic	Ohio State	Stanford
Pass Atts.	2	32
Pass Comps.	1	22
Pass Yards	18	269
Yds./Pass	18.0	12.2
Rush Atts.	56	40
Rush Yards	302	145
Yds./Rush	5.4	3.6
Total Yards	320	414
Fumbles Lost	0	1
Interceptions	0	3
Total Turnovers	0	4

Team	1	2	3	4	Total
Stanford	6	7	7	0	20
• Ohio State	14	0	6	12	32

- Date: October 6
- Location: Ohio Stadium
- Game attendance: 82,881

Scoring summary
Q1	OSU	Clark 35 yard run (Kriss kick)	OSU 7–0
Q1	STAN	Valli 8 yard run (kick failed)	OSU 7–6
Q1	OSU	Roseboro 7 yard run (Kriss kick)	OSU 14–6
Q2	STAN	Isaacs 11 yard pass from Brodie (Raftery kick)	OSU 14–13
Q3	OSU	Roseboro 7 yard run (kick failed)	OSU 20–13
Q3	STAN	Barber 4 yard pass from Brodie (Raftery kick)	tie 20–20
Q4	OSU	Clark 10 yard run (kick failed)	OSU 26–20
Q4	OSU	Clark 18 yard pass from Roseboro (kick failed)	OSU 32–20

=== Illinois ===
Team Statistics
Statistic	Illinois	Ohio State
Pass Atts.	14	3
Pass Comps.	8	2
Pass Yards	99	29
Yds./Pass	12.4	14.5
Rush Atts.	52	54
Rush Yards	190	282
Yds./Rush	3.7	5.2
Total Yards	289	311
Fumbles Lost	2	0
Interceptions	2	0
Total Turnovers	4	0

Team	1	2	3	4	Total
Illinois	6	0	0	0	6
• Ohio St	12	0	7	7	26

- Date: October 13
- Location: Memorial Stadium, Champaign, Illinois
- Game attendance: 58,247
- Game weather: Clear, 80 °F (27 °C), 25 mph winds

Scoring summary
Q1	ILL	Jefferson 44 yard run (kick failed)	ILL 0–6
Q1	OHST	Roseboro 1 yard run (kick failed)	tie 6–6
Q1	OHST	Roseboro 14 yard pass from Ellwood (kick failed)	OHST 12–6
Q3	OHST	Ellwood 6 yard run (Kremblas kick)	OHST 19–6
Q4	OHST	Ellwood 1 yard run (Kremblas kick)	OHST 26–6

=== Penn State ===
Team Statistics
Statistic	Ohio State	Penn State
Pass Atts.	10	17
Pass Comps.	3	9
Pass Yards	89	115
Yds./Pass	29.7	12.8
Rush Atts.	48	58
Rush Yards	188	173
Yds./Rush	3.9	3.0
Total Yards	277	288
Fumbles Lost	0	2
Interceptions	2	2
Total Turnovers	2	4

Team	1	2	3	4	Total
• Penn State	0	0	0	7	7
Ohio State	0	0	0	6	6

- Date: October 20
- Location: Ohio Stadium
- Game attendance: 82,584
- Game weather: 70 °F (21 °C)

Scoring summary
Q4	PSU	Gilmore 1 yard rush (Plum kick)	PSU 0–7
Q4	OSU	Clark 3 yard run (kick failed)	PSU 6–7

=== Wisconsin ===
Team Statistics
Statistic	Ohio State	Wisconsin
Pass Atts.	5	10
Pass Comps.	1	4
Pass Yards	28	44
Yds./Pass	28.0	11.0
Rush Atts.	67	56
Rush Yards	293	202
Yds./Rush	4.4	3.6
Total Yards	321	246
Fumbles Lost	0	4
Interceptions	1	1
Total Turnovers	1	5

Team	1	2	3	4	Total
Wisconsin	0	0	0	0	0
• Ohio State	7	0	7	7	21

- Date: October 27
- Location: Ohio Stadium
- Game attendance: 82,661
- Game weather: Clear, 57 °F (14 °C)

Scoring summary
Q1	OSU	Clark 23 yard run (Kriss kick)	OSU 7–0
Q3	OSU	Ellwood 1 yard run (Kriss kick)	OSU 14–0
Q4	OSU	Ellwood 1 yard run (Sutherin kick)	OSU 21–0

=== Northwestern ===
Team Statistics
Statistic	Northwestern	Ohio State
Pass Atts.	16	5
Pass Comps.	9	2
Pass Yards	79	19
Yds./Pass	8.8	9.5
Rush Atts.	44	54
Rush Yards	152	193
Yds./Rush	3.5	3.6
Total Yards	231	212
Fumbles Lost	1	0
Interceptions	1	0
Total Turnovers	2	0

Team	1	2	3	4	Total
• Ohio State	0	0	6	0	6
Northwestern	2	0	0	0	2

- Date: November 3
- Location: Dyche Stadium, Evanston, Illinois
- Game attendance: 41,000
- Game weather: Overcast

Scoring summary
Q1	NW	Blocked punt by Viola for safety	NW 0–2
Q3	OSU	Brown 7 yard pass from Ellwood (kick failed)	OSU 6–2

=== Indiana ===
Team Statistics
Statistic	Ohio State	Indiana
Pass Atts.	3	17
Pass Comps.	1	8
Pass Yards	5	147
Yds./Pass	5.0	18.4
Rush Atts.	75	32
Rush Yards	465	142
Yds./Rush	6.2	4.4
Total Yards	470	289
Fumbles Lost	2	2
Interceptions	0	3
Total Turnovers	2	5

Team	1	2	3	4	Total
Indiana	0	0	7	7	14
• Ohio State	7	14	7	7	35

- Date: November 10
- Location: Ohio Stadium
- Game attendance: 82,073
- Game weather: 44 °F (7 °C), Clear

Scoring summary
Q1	OSU	Ellwood 5 yard pass from Brown (kick good)	OSU 7–0
Q2	OSU	Clark 73 yard run (kick good)	OSU 14–0
Q2	OSU	Roseboro 2 yard run (kick good)	OSU 21–0
Q3	OSU	Ellwood 1 yard run (kick good)	OSU 28–0
Q3	IU	Ellwood 5 yard pass from Brown (Cichowski kick)	IU 28–7
Q4	OSU	Ellwood 5 yard pass from Brown (kick good)	OSU 35–7
Q4	IU	Clark 3 yard run (Cichowski kick)	IU 35–14

=== Iowa ===
Team Statistics
Statistic	Iowa	Ohio State
Pass Atts.	12	11
Pass Comps.	5	2
Pass Yards	63	18
Yds./Pass	12.6	9.0
Rush Atts.	51	50
Rush Yards	176	147
Yds./Rush	3.5	2.9
Total Yards	239	165
Fumbles Lost	2	1
Interceptions	0	0
Total Turnovers	2	1

Team	1	2	3	4	Total
Ohio State	0	0	0	0	0
• Iowa	0	0	6	0	6

- Location: Iowa Stadium, Iowa City, Iowa
- Game attendance: 57,732
- Game weather: 39 °F (4 °C), Clear, 5-8 mph wind from SW

Scoring summary
Q3	IOWA	Gilmore 1 yard rush (Prescott kick failed)	IOWA 6–0

=== Michigan ===
Team Statistics
Statistic	Ohio State	Michigan
Pass Atts.	5	21
Pass Comps.	1	10
Pass Yards	10	156
Yds./Pass	10.0	15.6
Rush Atts.	54	47
Rush Yards	182	127
Yds./Rush	3.4	2.7
Total Yards	192	283
Fumbles Lost	4	0
Interceptions	2	2
Total Turnovers	6	2

Team	1	2	3	4	Total
• Michigan	13	0	0	6	19
Ohio State	0	0	0	0	0

- Location: Ohio Stadium
- Game attendance: 85,223
- Game weather: 28 °F (−2 °C), Clear

Scoring summary
Q1	MICH	Barr 21 yard pass from Van Pelt (Kramer kick failed)	UM 0–6
Q1	MICH	Barr 4 yard rush (Kramer kick)	UM 0–13
Q4	MICH	Maddock 1 yard run (Kramer kick failed)	UM 0–19

== Roster ==
- HB Dick LeBeau, So.

== Rankings and awards ==
On December 3, 1956, both the Associated Press (AP) and United Press (UP) released their final college football polls. Both organizations ranked undefeated Oklahoma at the No. 1 spot. The AP ranked Ohio State at No. 15, while the UP did not rank Ohio State in its top 20.

Only one Ohio State player, guard Jim Parker, was picked by the Associated Press (AP) and/or the United Press (UP) as a first-team player on the 1956 All-Big Ten Conference football team. Parker received first-team honors from both the AP and UP. Parker was also a consensus first-team pick for the 1956 College Football All-America Team. He also ranked ninth in the 1956 Heisman Trophy voting. Parker was also awarded the Outland Trophy.

== 1957 NFL draft ==
The following Ohio State players were selected in the 1957 NFL draft:

Player	Round	Pick	Position	NFL club
Jim Parker	1	8	Tackle	Baltimore Colts
Bill Michael	2	16	Guard	Pittsburgh Steelers
Jim Roseboro	11	124	Back	Green Bay Packers
Bill Cummings	11	125	Tackle	Cleveland Browns
Hubert Bobo	13	146	Linebacker	Philadelphia Eagles
Joe Cannavino	16	185	Defensive back	Baltimore Colts
Dick Guy	18	212	Guard	San Francisco 49ers
Aurelius Thomas	22	257	Guard	Pittsburgh Steelers
Andy Okulovich	27	319	Back	Cleveland Browns
Don Vicic	27	320	Back	San Francisco 49ers
Lee Williams	30	351	Back	Los Angeles Rams
