= 1956 Minnesota Golden Gophers football team =

American college football season

1956 Minnesota Golden Gophers football
- Conference: Big Ten Conference

Ranking
- Coaches: No. 9
- AP: No. 12
- Record: 6–1–2 (4–1–2 Big Ten)
- Head coach: Murray Warmath (3rd season)
- MVP: Bobby Cox
- Captain: Dean Maas
- Home stadium: Memorial Stadium

1956 Big Ten Conference football standings
	Conf.					Overall
Team	W		L		T	W		L		T
No. 3 Iowa $	5	–	1	–	0	9	–	1	–	0
No. 7 Michigan	5	–	2	–	0	7	–	2	–	0
No. 12 Minnesota	4	–	1	–	2	6	–	1	–	2
No. 9 Michigan State	4	–	2	–	0	7	–	2	–	0
No. 15 Ohio State	4	–	2	–	0	6	–	3	–	0
Northwestern	3	–	3	–	1	4	–	4	–	1
Purdue	1	–	4	–	2	3	–	4	–	2
Illinois	1	–	4	–	2	2	–	5	–	2
Wisconsin	0	–	4	–	3	1	–	5	–	3
Indiana	1	–	5	–	0	3	–	6	–	0
$ – Conference champion; Rankings from AP Poll

The 1956 Minnesota Golden Gophers football team was an American football team that represented the University of Minnesota in the 1956 Big Ten Conference football season. In their third year under head coach Murray Warmath, the Golden Gophers compiled a 6–1–2 record and outscored their opponents by a combined total of 127 to 87. The team finished 12th in the final AP poll and ninth in the final Coaches Poll.

Quarterback Bobby Cox received the team's Most Valuable Player award. Tackle Bob Hobert was selected by the Football Writers Association of America (for Look magazine) as a first-team player on the 1956 College Football All-America Team. Hobert was also named All-Big Ten first team, Academic All-American and Academic All-Big Ten. Offensive lineman Perry Gehring was named Academic All-Big Ten.

Total attendance for the season was 372,654, which averaged to 62,109. The season high for attendance was against rival Iowa.

== Schedule ==
Date	Opponent	Rank	Site	Result	Attendance
September 29	at Washington*		Husky Stadium; Seattle, WA	W 34–14	41,000
October 6	Purdue		Memorial Stadium; Minneapolis, MN	W 21–14	58,660
October 13	Northwestern	No. 17	Memorial Stadium; Minneapolis, MN	T 0–0	62,006
October 20	Illinois		Memorial Stadium; Minneapolis, MN	W 16–13	62,614
October 27	at No. 5 Michigan		Michigan Stadium; Ann Arbor, MI (Little Brown Jug)	W 20–7	84,639
November 3	No. 11 Pittsburgh*^{†}	No. 8	Memorial Stadium; Minneapolis, MN	W 9–6	63,158
November 10	No. 15 Iowa	No. 6	Memorial Stadium; Minneapolis, MN (rivalry)	L 0–7	64,235
November 17	No. 3 Michigan State	No. 17	Memorial Stadium; Minneapolis, MN	W 14–13	61,981
November 24	at Wisconsin	No. 7	Camp Randall Stadium; Madison, WI (rivalry)	T 13–13	54,149
*Non-conference game; ^{†}Homecoming; Rankings from AP Poll released prior to the game

== Game summaries ==
On September 29, 1956, Minnesota defeated Washington, 34–14, before a crowd of 40,000 at Husky Stadium in Seattle. Quarterbacks Dick Larson and Bobby Cox led Minnesota on offense. Cox had played for Washington in 1954 threw a touchdown pass to give Minnesota the lead at halftime.

On October 6, Minnesota defeated Purdue, 21–14, before a crowd of 59,314 at Memorial Stadium in Minneapolis. Fullback Dick Borstad scored two Minnesota touchdowns on runs of 23 yards and one yard. Purdue quarterback Len Dawson completed seven of 13 passes for 102 yards and three interceptions.

On October 13, Minnesota (ranked No. 17 in the AP Poll) and Northwestern played to a scoreless tie in front of a crowd of 62,006 at Memorial Stadium in Minneapolis. Minnesota had been a 14-point favorite and moved the ball well, out-gaining Northwestern 271 yards to 142. However, the Gophers were unable to score, turning the ball over on fumbles three times, including one at Northwestern's goal line. Heavy rain slowed the teams in the second half.

On October 20, Minnesota defeated Illinois, 16–13, before a crowd of 63,037 at Memorial Stadium in Minneapolis. Dick Borstad kicked a field goal with two minutes remaining to put the Golden Gophers in the lead.

On October 27, in the annual battle for the Little Brown Jug, Minnesota defeated Michigan (ranked No. 5 in the AP Poll), 20–7, before a crowd of 84,639 at Michigan Stadium. Michigan led, 7–0, at halftime on 16-yard touchdown run by Terry Barr, but Barr was injured on the touchdown and did not return to the game. Minnesota came back in the second half with 20 unanswered points, including two touchdown runs by Bobby Cox.

On November 3, Minnesota (ranked No. 8 in the AP Poll) defeated Pittsburgh, 9–6, before a homecoming crowd of 63,158 at Memorial Stadium in Minneapolis. Minnesota's Dick Borstad kicked a field goal with two-and-a-half minutes to go to give Minnesota the lead. Pitt's Joe Walton returned the ensuing kickoff for a touchdown, but the return was called back due to a clipping penalty.

On November 10, Minnesota lost to 1956 Big Ten champion Iowa, 7–0, before a crowd of 64,235 at Memorial Stadium in Minneapolis. Iowa coach implemented a 6-3-2 defense to contain Minnesota's speedy Bobby Cox. After the game, Cox noted: "I couldn't go outside. They forced me to go inside and then some linebacker would nail me." The outcome put Iowa into the lead in the race for the conference's Rose Bowl bid. After the game, Iowa's players carried coach Evashevski off the field on their shoulders.

On November 17, Minnesota (ranked No. 17 in the AP Poll) upset Michigan State (ranked No. 3), 14–13, before a crowd of 62,478 at Memorial Stadium in Minneapolis. Bobby Cox led the way for Minnesota

On November 24, in the annual battle for Paul Bunyan's Axe, Minnesota (ranked No. 7 in the AP Poll) and Wisconsin played to a 13–13 tie before a crowd of 54,149 at Camp Randall Stadium in Madison. On the final play of the game, Wisconsin's Jon Hobbs missed his third field goal attempt of the game. Wisconsin finished the season without a conference win for the first time since 1939.

== Rankings and awards ==
On December 3, 1956, both the Associated Press (AP) and United Press (UP) released their final college football polls. Both organizations ranked undefeated Oklahoma at the No. 1 spot. The AP ranked the Golden Gophers No. 12, and the UP ranked them No. 9.

Only one Minnesota player, tackle Bob Hobert, was picked by the Associated Press (AP) and/or the United Press (UP) as a first-team player on the 1956 All-Big Ten Conference football team. Hobert received first-team honors from both the AP and UP. Hobert was also selected by the Football Writers Association of America as a first-team pick for the 1956 College Football All-America Team.
