= 1956 Michigan Wolverines football team =

American college football season

1956 Michigan Wolverines football
- Conference: Big Ten Conference

Ranking
- Coaches: No. 7
- AP: No. 7
- Record: 7–2 (5–2 Big Ten)
- Head coach: Bennie Oosterbaan (9th season)
- MVP: Dick Hill
- Captain: Tom Maentz
- Home stadium: Michigan Stadium

1956 Big Ten Conference football standings
	Conf.					Overall
Team	W		L		T	W		L		T
No. 3 Iowa $	5	–	1	–	0	9	–	1	–	0
No. 7 Michigan	5	–	2	–	0	7	–	2	–	0
No. 12 Minnesota	4	–	1	–	2	6	–	1	–	2
No. 9 Michigan State	4	–	2	–	0	7	–	2	–	0
No. 15 Ohio State	4	–	2	–	0	6	–	3	–	0
Northwestern	3	–	3	–	1	4	–	4	–	1
Purdue	1	–	4	–	2	3	–	4	–	2
Illinois	1	–	4	–	2	2	–	5	–	2
Wisconsin	0	–	4	–	3	1	–	5	–	3
Indiana	1	–	5	–	0	3	–	6	–	0
$ – Conference champion; Rankings from AP Poll

The 1956 Michigan Wolverines football team was an American football team that represented the University of Michigan in the 1956 Big Ten Conference football season. In their ninth year under head coach was Bennie Oosterbaan, the Wolverines compiled a 7–2 record (5–2 Big Ten), outscored opponents 233 to 123, and finished the season in second place in the Big Ten Conference and ranked No. 7 in the final 1956 AP poll. The team played five of its nine games against ranked opponents, losing to No. 2 Michigan State by a 9–0 score and No. 15 Minnesota by a 20–7 score, but defeating No. 15 Army by a 48–14 score, No. 7 Iowa by a 17–14 score, and No. 12 Ohio State by a 19–0 score.

End Ron Kramer was selected as a consensus All-American and a first team All-Big Ten player. Guard Dick Hill was selected as the team's Most Valuable Player and was named by the Associated Press (AP) as a first-team All-Big Ten player. Halfback Terry Barr averaged 6.1 yards per carry rushing and 19.7 yards per punt return and was selected as a first-team All-Big Ten player by the United Press (UP).

== Schedule ==
Date	Opponent	Rank	Site	Result	Attendance
September 29	UCLA*	No. 13	Michigan Stadium; Ann Arbor, MI	W 42–13	70,159
October 6	No. 2 Michigan State	No. 5	Michigan Stadium; Ann Arbor, MI (rivalry)	L 0–9	101,001
October 13	No. 15 Army*	No. 12	Michigan Stadium; Ann Arbor, MI	W 48–14	93,101–93,402
October 20	Northwestern	No. 8	Michigan Stadium; Ann Arbor, MI (rivalry)	W 34–20	81,718
October 27	Minnesota^{†}	No. 5	Michigan Stadium; Ann Arbor, MI (Little Brown Jug)	L 7–20	85,566
November 3	at No. 7 Iowa	No. 17	Iowa Stadium; Iowa City, IA	W 17–14	55,896
November 10	Illinois	No. 10	Michigan Stadium; Ann Arbor, MI (rivalry)	W 17–7	75,735
November 17	Indiana	No. 10	Michigan Stadium; Ann Arbor, MI	W 49–26	58,515
November 24	at No. 12 Ohio State	No. 9	Ohio Stadium; Columbus, OH (rivalry)	W 19–0	78,830
*Non-conference game; ^{†}Homecoming; Rankings from AP Poll released prior to the game

== Game summaries ==
=== Game 1: UCLA ===
Week 1: UCLA at Michigan

Team	1	2	3	4	Total
UCLA	0	0	7	6	13
• Michigan	14	14	7	7	42

- Date: September 29
- Location: Michigan Stadium
- Game attendance: 67,739
- Referee: Tony Skover

On September 29, 1956, Michigan opened its season with a 42–13 victory over UCLA. The Bruins were ranked #4 in the final AP Poll in 1955, but lost a number of players due to sanctions imposed by the Pacific Coast Conference. Michigan rushed for 234 yards against UCLA, including 67 yards by junior halfback Jim Pace. In the air, Michigan completed four of nine passes for 103 yards, including a 13-yard touchdown pass from Bob Ptacek to Jim Van Pelt and a 70-yard touchdown pass from Terry Barr to Ron Kramer. Barr also set up a touchdown with a 51-yard punt return to the UCLA 15-yard line in the first quarter. Halfback John Herrnstein scored two touchdowns for Michigan on runs of six and four yards. Ed Shannon and Jim Dickey also scored touchdowns for Michigan. Kramer and Maddock each kicked three extra points for Michigan.

=== Game 2: Michigan State ===
Week 2: Michigan State at Michigan

Team	1	2	3	4	Total
• Michigan State	0	0	3	6	9
Michigan	0	0	0	0	0

- Date: October 6
- Location: Michigan Stadium
- Game attendance: 101,001

On October 6, 1956, Michigan (ranked No. 5 in the AP Poll) lost to Michigan State (ranked No. 2), 9–0, before a crowd of 101,001 at Michigan Stadium. After a scoreless first half in which Michigan dominated statistically, turnovers led to two Michigan State scores. In the third quarter, John Herrnstein was intercepted at Michigan's 38-yard line, setting up a 20-yard field goal by John Matsko. In the fourth quarter, Herrnstein fumbled, and Michigan State recovered the ball at Michigan's 21-yard line, leading to a Spartan touchdown shortly thereafter.

=== Game 3: Army ===
Week 3: Army at Michigan

Team	1	2	3	4	Total
Army	0	0	0	14	14
• Michigan	7	20	21	0	48

- Date: October 13
- Location: Michigan Stadium
- Game attendance: 93,101–93,402

On October 13, 1956, Michigan (ranked No. 12 in the AP Poll) defeated Army (ranked No. 15), 48–14, before a crowd of 93,101 at Michigan Stadium. Army fumbled eight times with Michigan recovering six times. Michigan led, 27-0, at halftime, and none of Michigan's starters played in the second half. Michigan totaled 246 rushing yards and 124 passing yards. Seven different Wolverines scored touchdowns: Jim Pace, Terry Barr, Bob Ptacek, Gary Prahst, John Herrnstein, Jim Van Pelt, and Jim Maddock.

=== Game 4: Northwestern ===
Week 4: Northwestern at Michigan

Team	1	2	3	4	Total
Northwestern	7	6	0	7	20
• Michigan	13	14	0	7	34

- Date: October 20, 1956
- Location: Michigan Stadium
- Game attendance: 81,227

On October 20, 1956, Michigan (ranked No. 8 in the AP Poll) defeated Northwestern, 34–20, before a crowd of 81,227 at Michigan Stadium. John Herrnstein scored three touchdowns. Jim Maddock scored on a 15-yard pass from Bob Ptacek, and Ron Kramer also scored on a 15-yard pass from Terry Barr. Michigan totaled 283 rushing yards and 156 passing yards.

=== Game 9: Ohio State ===
On November 24, Michigan defeated Ohio State, 19-0, before a crowd of 82,223 in Columbus, Ohio. Senior back Terry Barr, playing in his final game for Michigan, scored two touchdowns. Quarterback Jim Maddock also scored a touchdown. Ron Kramer converted one of three extra point kicks. On defense, the Wolverines allowed only one completed pass and intercepted two.

== Postseason ==
In the final polls released in early December, Michigan was ranked No. 7 by both the Associated Press and United Press.

End Ron Kramer was a unanimous pick for the 1956 All-America college football team. He received first-team honors from all seven official selectors: Collier's/American Football Coaches Association (AFCA), Associated Press (AP), Look magazine/Football Writers Association of America (FWAA), International News Service (INS), Newspaper Enterprise Association (NEA), The Sporting News (TSN), and United Press (UP).

Five Michigan players received honors on the 1956 All-Big Ten Conference football team:

- Ron Kramer, end - AP (first team), UP (first team)
- Terry Barr, halfback - UP (first team)
- Dick Hill, guard - AP (first team), UP (third team)
- John Herrnstein, fullback - AP (second team), UP (second tea)
- Tom Maentz, end - AP (second team), UP (third team)

Guard Dick Hill won the team's award as most valuable player. Fullback John Herrnstein won the Meyer Morton and John Maulbetsch Awards.

== Personnel ==
=== Varsity letter winners ===
The following players won varsity letters for their participation on the 1956 Michigan football team. Players who started at least half of Michigan's games are shown in bold.

- **Terry Barr**, halfback, senior, Grand Rapids, Michigan – started 7 games at right halfback
- Thomas E. Berger, guard, junior, Detroit
- Alex Bochnowski, guard, junior, Munster, Indiana
- David C. Bowers, end, junior, Traverse City, Michigan
- Charles Books, end, senior, Marshall, Michigan
- James Byers, fullback, sophomore, Evansville, Indiana
- Clement Corona, guard, senior, Berwick, Pennsylvania
- James H. Davies, tackle, senior, Muskegon Heights, Michigan
- James A. Dickey, fullback, junior, Miamisburg, Ohio
- Lawrence Faul, guard, junior, River Forest, Illinois
- John Greenwood, halfback, senior, Bay City, Michigan
- **John Herrnstein**, fullback, sophomore, Chillicothe, Ohio – started 9 games at fullback
- Richard B. Heynen, tackle, senior, Grand Rapids, Michigan
- **Dick Hill**, guard, sophomore, Gary, Indiana – started 9 games at left guard
- Walter N. Johnson, end, sophomore, Dearborn, Michigan
- **Ron Kramer**, end, senior, East Detroit, Michigan – started 9 games at left end
- Jack Lousma, quarterback, sophomore, Ann Arbor, Michigan
- Jim Maddock, quarterback, senior, Chicago
- **Tom Maentz**, end, senior, Holland, Michigan – started 9 games at right end
- Jerry Marciniak, fullback, sophomore, Chicago
- **Marvin R. Nyren**, guard, junior, Des Plaines, Illinois – started 9 games at right guard
- **James B. Orwig**, tackle, senior, Toledo, Ohio – started 9 games at left tackle
- **Jim Pace**, halfback, junior, Little Rock, Arkansas – started 7 games at left halfback
- Gary Prahst, end, sophomore, Berea, Ohio
- Bob Ptacek, halfback, sophomore, Cleveland – started 2 games at left halfback
- David F. Rentschler, halfback, junior, Detroit
- **Mike Rotunno**, center, senior, Canton, Ohio – started 8 games at center
- Edward J. Shannon, running back, senior, River Forest, Illinois – started 2 games at right halfback
- Michael Shatusky, halfback, senior, Menominee, Michigan
- **Lionel Albert Sigman**, tackle, senior, Ann Arbor, Michigan – started 9 games at right tackle
- Eugene Sisinyak, fullback, sophomore, Monroe, Michigan
- Willie Smith, tackle, sophomore, Little Rock, Arkansas – tackle
- Eugene "Gene" Snider, center, junior, Hamtramck, Michigan – started 1 game at center
- John Spidel, quarterback, sophomore, Greenville, Ohio
- **Jim Van Pelt**, quarterback, junior, Evanston, Illinois – started 9 games at quarterback
- Raymond L. Wine, center, sophomore, Port Huron, Michigan

=== Coaching staff ===
- Head coach: Bennie Oosterbaan
- Assistant coaches:

- Backfield: Don Robinson
- Line: Jack Blott, assisted by Don Dufek
- Ends: Matt Patanelli
- Freshmen: Wally Weber
- Scout: Pete Kinyon
- Others: Bob Hollway, Cliff Keen

- Trainer: Jim Hunt
- Manager: Dave Lundquist

== Statistical leaders ==
=== Rushing ===
Player	Attempts	Net yards	Yards per attempt	Touchdowns
Jim Pace	103	498	4.8	2
John Herrnstein	123	475	3.9	7
Terry Barr	60	366	6.1	6

=== Passing ===
Player	Attempts	Completions	Interceptions	Comp %	Yards	Yds/Comp	TD	Long
Bob Ptacek	23	15	2	65.2	245	16.3	3	25
Jim Van Pelt	33	15	1	45.5	221	14.7	1	37
Jim Maddock	42	19	3	45.2	213	11.2	0	18

=== Receiving ===
Player	Receptions	Yards	Yds/Recp	TD	Long
Ron Kramer	18	353	19.6	2	70
Jim Pace	7	155	22.1	0	37
Jim Maddock	5	79	15.8	1	23

=== Kickoff returns ===
Player	Returns	Yards	Yds/Return	TD	Long
Jim Pace	11	274	24.9	0	39
Jim Van Pelt	4	84	21.0	0	36

=== Punt returns ===
Player	Returns	Yards	Yds/Return	TD	Long
Terry Barr	6	118	19.7	0	51
Ed Shannon	7	38	5.4	0	9
