= 1956 Michigan State Spartans football team =

American college football season

1956 Michigan State Spartans football
- Conference: Big Ten Conference

Ranking
- Coaches: No. 10
- AP: No. 9
- Record: 7–2 (4–2 Big Ten)
- Head coach: Duffy Daugherty (3rd season)
- MVP: James Hinsley
- Captain: John Matsko
- Home stadium: Macklin Stadium

1956 Big Ten Conference football standings
	Conf.					Overall
Team	W		L		T	W		L		T
No. 3 Iowa $	5	–	1	–	0	9	–	1	–	0
No. 7 Michigan	5	–	2	–	0	7	–	2	–	0
No. 12 Minnesota	4	–	1	–	2	6	–	1	–	2
No. 9 Michigan State	4	–	2	–	0	7	–	2	–	0
No. 15 Ohio State	4	–	2	–	0	6	–	3	–	0
Northwestern	3	–	3	–	1	4	–	4	–	1
Purdue	1	–	4	–	2	3	–	4	–	2
Illinois	1	–	4	–	2	2	–	5	–	2
Wisconsin	0	–	4	–	3	1	–	5	–	3
Indiana	1	–	5	–	0	3	–	6	–	0
$ – Conference champion; Rankings from AP Poll

The 1956 Michigan State Spartans football team was an American football team that represented Michigan State University in the 1956 Big Ten Conference football season. In their third season under head coach Duffy Daugherty, the Spartans compiled a 7–2 overall record (4–2 against Big Ten Conference opponents) and were ranked No. 9 in the final AP poll and No. 10 in the final Coaches Poll.

Center John Matsko was selected by the Associated Press as a first-team player on the 1956 All-Big Ten Conference football team. The team's statistical leaders included quarterback Pat Wilson with 414 passing yards, Dennis Mendyk with 495 rushing yards, and Tony Kolodziej with 221 receiving yards.

== Schedule ==
Date	Opponent	Rank	Site	Result	Attendance
September 29	at No. 12 Stanford*	No. 3	Stanford Stadium; Stanford, CA	W 21–7	55,000
October 6	at No. 5 Michigan	No. 2	Michigan Stadium; Ann Arbor, MI (rivalry)	W 9–0	101,001
October 13	Indiana^{†}	No. 2	Macklin Stadium; East Lansing, MI (rivalry)	W 53–6	58,858
October 20	at Notre Dame*	No. 2	Notre Dame Stadium; Notre Dame, IN (rivalry)	W 47–14	59,378
October 27	at Illinois	No. 1	Memorial Stadium; Champaign, IL	L 13–20	71,119
November 3	Wisconsin	No. 4	Macklin Stadium; East Lansing, MI	W 33–0	53,647
November 10	Purdue	No. 4	Macklin Stadium; East Lansing, MI	W 12–9	56,431
November 17	at No. 17 Minnesota	No. 3	Memorial Stadium; Minneapolis, MN	L 13–14	62,478
November 24	Kansas State*	No. 10	Macklin Stadium; East Lansing, MI	W 38–17	34,115
*Non-conference game; ^{†}Homecoming; Rankings from AP Poll released prior to the game

== Preseason ==
In the final AP Poll of the 1955 season, Michigan State had been ranked No. 2. In the 1956 pre-season AP Poll, Michigan State remained ranked at No. 2.

== Game summaries ==
On September 29, 1956, Michigan State (ranked No. 3 in the AP Poll) defeated Stanford (ranked No. 12), 21–7, before a crowd of 55,000 at Stanford Stadium in Stanford, California. The game was tied at the end of the third quarter, and Michigan State scored two touchdowns in the fourth quarter. Dennis Mendyk rushed for 72 yards on 14 carries.

On October 6, Michigan State (ranked No. 2 in the AP Poll) defeated Michigan (ranked No. 5), 9–0, before a crowd of 101,001 at Michigan Stadium in Ann Arbor. Michigan dominated the game in the first half but was unable to score. Michigan State was hampered by an ankle injury to its leading rusher (Walt Kowalczyk) and a passing game that failed to complete a single pass. In the third quarter, the Spartans kicked a field goal after Arch Matsos intercepted a pass at Michigan's 38-yard line. John Matsko, who had not attempted a field goal in high school or in three years of college ball, kicked the field goal. In the fourth quarter, John Herrnstein fumbled at Michigan's 21-yard line, setting up a touchdown run by Dennis Mendyk.

On October 13, Michigan State (ranked No. 2 in the AP Poll) defeated Indiana, 53–6, before a crowd of 58,858 at Macklin Stadium in East Lansing, Michigan. The Spartans gained 264 rushing yards and 204 passing yards. Clarence Peaks also returned a punt 63 yards for a touchdown. Michigan State played backups for much of the second half with a total of 50 Spartans seeing game action. The outcome was Indiana's worst defeat since 1948.

On October 20, Michigan State (ranked No. 2 in the AP Poll) defeated Notre Dame, 47–14, before a crowd of 59,378 at Notre Dame Stadium in South Bend. Michigan State gained 521 yards, 396 on the ground and 171 in the air. Dennis Mendyk led the Spartans attack with 157 rushing yards, including touchdown runs of 62 and 68 yards in the third quarter. After the game, Michigan State rose to No. 1 in the following week's AP and UPI polls.

On October 20, Illinois defeated Michigan State, 20–13, before a homecoming crowd of 71,119 at Memorial Stadium in Champaign. Michigan State was ranked No. 1 before the game and had its national championship hopes, and a 12-game winning streak, dashed by the defeat. The Spartans led, 13–0, at halftime, but Abe Woodson, the Big Ten's indoor sprint champion, led the Illini to 20 unanswered points in the second half. Woodson scored all three Illinois touchdowns: a 70-yard touchdown run, an 82-touchdown reception, and a short touchdown run. Woodson had 116 rushing yards and total gains of 198 yards.

On November 3, Michigan State (ranked No. 4 in the AP Poll) defeated Wisconsin, 33–0, before a crowd of 53,647 at Macklin Stadium in East Lansing. Michigan State totaled 352 rushing yards and 168 passing yards. The result was Wisconsin's worst defeat since 1949.

On November 10, Michigan State (ranked No. 4 in the AP Poll) defeated Purdue, 12–9, before a crowd of 56,431 at Macklin Stadium in East Lansing. Purdue was a three touchdown underdog without Len Dawson but scored on a touchdown run by Mel Dillard and a safety triggered by Fletcher tackling Martin in the end zone. Michigan State scored two touchdowns, a 27-yard pass from Jim Ninowski to Harold Dukes, and a fumble recovery by Tony Kolodziej in Purdue's end zone.

On November 17, Minnesota (ranked No. 17 in the AP Poll) defeated Michigan State (ranked No. 3), 14–13, before a crowd of 62,478 at Memorial Stadium in Minneapolis. Bobby Cox led the way for Minnesota.

On November 24, Michigan State (ranked No. 10 in the AP Poll) defeated Kansas State, 38–17, before a crowd of 34,115 at Macklin Stadium in East Lansing. Michigan State set a modern school record with 12 fumbles in the game. Despite the victory, Hal Middlesworth of the Detroit Free Press wrote: "But down on the frozen turf of Macklin Stadium, it was a fumbling, bumbling performance which will find no place among State's galaxy of great games."

== Rankings and awards ==
On December 3, 1956, both the Associated Press (AP) and United Press (UP) released their final college football polls. Both organizations ranked undefeated Oklahoma at the No. 1 spot. The AP ranked the Spartans at No. 9, and the UP ranked them at No. 10

Only one Michigan State player, center John Matsko, was picked by the Associated Press (AP) and/or the United Press (UP) as a first-team player on the 1956 All-Big Ten Conference football team. Matsko received first-team honors from the AP. Three other Spartans received second-team all-conference honors: halfback Clarence Peaks (AP-2, UP-2), guard Dan Currie (AP-2, UP-2), and tackle Joel Jones (AP-2, UP-2). No Michigan State players received first-team All-American honors in 1956, though Matsko and Currie received second-team honors.

James Hinsley received the team's most valuable player award.

== 1957 NFL draft ==
The following Michigan State players were among the first 100 picks in the 1957 NFL draft:

Name	Position	Team	Round	Overall pick
Clarence Peaks	Fullback	Michigan State	1	7
Dennis Mendyk	Back	Michigan State	3	35
Vic Zucco	Back	Michigan State	5	60
Tom Saidock	Tackle	Michigan State	7	74
