= John Matsko =

John Matsko may refer to:

- John Matsko (American football coach) (born 1951), American football offensive line coach
- John Matsko (American football player) (1933–2010)
