= 1956 Iowa Hawkeyes football team =

American college football season

1956 Iowa Hawkeyes football

National champion (CFRA) Big Ten champion Rose Bowl champion

Rose Bowl, W 35–19 vs. Oregon State
- Conference: Big Ten Conference

Ranking
- Coaches: No. 3
- AP: No. 3
- Record: 9–1 (5–1 Big Ten)
- Head coach: Forest Evashevski (5th season)
- MVP: Ken Ploen
- Captains: Richard Deasy; Donald Suchy
- Home stadium: Iowa Stadium

1956 Big Ten Conference football standings
| | Conf. | | | | | Overall |
| Team | W | | L | | T | W | | L | | T |
|---|---|---|---|---|---|---|---|---|---|---|
| No. 3 Iowa $ | 5 | – | 1 | – | 0 | 9 | – | 1 | – | 0 |
| No. 7 Michigan | 5 | – | 2 | – | 0 | 7 | – | 2 | – | 0 |
| No. 12 Minnesota | 4 | – | 1 | – | 2 | 6 | – | 1 | – | 2 |
| No. 9 Michigan State | 4 | – | 2 | – | 0 | 7 | – | 2 | – | 0 |
| No. 15 Ohio State | 4 | – | 2 | – | 0 | 6 | – | 3 | – | 0 |
| Northwestern | 3 | – | 3 | – | 1 | 4 | – | 4 | – | 1 |
| Purdue | 1 | – | 4 | – | 2 | 3 | – | 4 | – | 2 |
| Illinois | 1 | – | 4 | – | 2 | 2 | – | 5 | – | 2 |
| Wisconsin | 0 | – | 4 | – | 3 | 1 | – | 5 | – | 3 |
| Indiana | 1 | – | 5 | – | 0 | 3 | – | 6 | – | 0 |
$ – Conference champion; Rankings from AP Poll

The 1956 Iowa Hawkeyes football team was an American football team that represented the University of Iowa as a member of the Big Ten Conference during the 1956 Big Ten football season. In their fifth season under head coach Forest Evashevski, the Hawkeyes compiled a 9–1 record (5–1 in conference games), won the Big Ten championship, and outscored opponents by a total of 184 to 65. They shut out No. 6 Minnesota (7–0) and No. 6 Ohio State (6–0), won in a blowout over Notre Dame (48–8 with a school record 409 rushing yards), but lost to No. 17 Michigan. As Big Ten champion, the Hawkeyes played in the 1957 Rose Bowl, defeating Oregon State (35–19) in a rematch of a regular season game.

The Hawkeyes were ranked No. 3 in the final AP and UPI polls, both issued prior to the Rose Bowl. They were later selected as the national champion by the College Football Researchers Association.

The 1956 Hawkeyes gained 2,374 rushing yards and 582 passing yards. On defense, they gave up 1,451 rushing yards and 913 passing yards. The defense gave up 8.4 points per game, the best scoring defense by an Iowa team in the modern era (since 1940). They allowed 229.8 yards per game, the second lowest total defense mark in school history.

Quarterback Ken Ploen led the team in rushing (487 yards), passing (386 yards), total offense (873 yards), and scoring (38 points on six touchdowns and two extra-point kicks. Jim Gibbons led in receiving (255 yards). Ploen received the Chicago Tribune Silver Football trophy as the most valuable player in the Big Ten. Tackle Alex Karras was selected as a first-team All-American.

The team played its home games at Iowa Stadium in Iowa City, Iowa. Home attendance was 306,478, an average of 51,079 per game.

== Schedule ==
| Date | Opponent | Rank | Site | TV | Result | Attendance |
|---|---|---|---|---|---|---|
| September 29 | at Indiana | | Memorial Stadium; Bloomington, IN | | W 27–0 | 25,000 |
| October 6 | Oregon State* | No. 20 | Iowa Stadium; Iowa City, IA | | W 14–13 | 41,027 |
| October 13 | Wisconsin | | Iowa Stadium; Iowa City, IA (rivalry) | | W 13–7 | 53,273 |
| October 20 | Hawaii* | No. 12 | Iowa Stadium; Iowa City, IA | | W 34–0 | 40,000 |
| October 27 | at Purdue | No. 12 | Ross–Ade Stadium; West Lafayette, IN | | W 21–20 | 41,415 |
| November 3 | No. 17 Michigan | No. 7 | Iowa Stadium; Iowa City, IA | | L 14–17 | 55,896 |
| November 10 | at No. 6 Minnesota | No. 15 | Memorial Stadium; Minneapolis, MN | | W 7–0 | 64,235 |
| November 17 | No. 6 Ohio State | No. 7 | Iowa Stadium; Iowa City, IA | | W 6–0 | 57,732 |
| November 24 | Notre Dame* | No. 3 | Iowa Stadium; Iowa City, IA | | W 48–8 | 56,632 |
| January 1 | vs. No. 10 Oregon State* | No. 3 | Rose Bowl; Pasadena, CA (Rose Bowl) | NBC | W 35–19 | 97,126 |
*Non-conference game; Rankings from AP Poll released prior to the game

== Personnel ==
=== Players ===
The following players received varsity letters for their performance on the 1955 Iowa football team:

- Don Ahlgren, end, senior, No. 78, 6–2, 200 pounds, Cedar Rapids, IA
- Frank Bloomquist, guard, junior, No. 64, 6–2, 205 pounds, Waterloo, IA
- Don Bowen, guard, junior, No. 63, 6–2, 198 pounds, East St. Louis, IL
- John A. Burroughs Jr., tackle, junior, No. 72, 6–4, 209 pounds, Washington, DC
- Bob Commings, guard, junior, No. 50, 5–9, 173 pounds, Youngstown, OH
- Dick Deasy, tackle, senior, No. 73, 6–0, 197 pounds, Chicago
- Don Dobrino, halfback, senior, No. 20, 6–3, 200 pounds, Mt. Olive, IL
- Hugh Drake, guard, sophomore, No. 66, 6–0, 190 pounds, Shenandoah, IA
- Randy Duncan, quarterback, sophomore, No. 25, 6–0, 179 pounds, Des Moines, IA
- Jim Gibbons, end, junior, No. 88, 6–3, 200 pounds, Chicago
- Frank Gilliam, end, senior, No. 37, 6–2, 173 pounds, Steubenville, OH
- Gary Grouwinkel, guard, sophomore, No. 60, 6–1, 199 pounds, Columbus Junction, IA
- Collins Hagler, halfback, junior, No. 44, 5–9, 163 pounds, Washington, DC
- Bill Happel, halfback, junior, No. 40, 5–11, 163 pounds, Cedar Rapids, IA
- Fred Harris, fullback, junior, No. 35, 6–1, 194 pounds, Bannockburn, IL
- Toni Hatch, end, senior, No. 89, 6–1, 192 pounds, Lancaster, WI
- Bob Haussman, end, senior, No. 84, 6–0, 171 pounds, Gary, IN
- Alex Karras, tackle, junior, No. 77, 6–2, 233 pounds, Gary, IN
- Dick Klein, tackle, sohomore, No. 70, 6–4, 250 pounds, Pana, IL
- Delmar Kloewer, halfback, junior, No. 15, 6–0, 175 pounds, Manilla, IA
- George Kress, tackle, senior, No. 76, 6–2, 220 pounds, Dubuque, IA
- Jeff Langston, end, sophomore, No. 85, 6–1, 182 pounds, Iowa City, IA
- Charles "Mac" Lewis, center, sophomore, No. 74, 6-6, 283 pounds, Chicago
- John Nocera, fullback, sophomore, No. 33, 6–1, 203 pounds, Youngstown, OH
- Orlando Pellegrino, halfback, senior, No. 43, 5–11, 176 pounds, Chicago
- Charles Pierce, center, junior, No. 54, 6–2, 199 pounds, Sycamore, IL
- Ken Ploen, quarterback, senior, No. 11, 6–2, 177 pounds, Clinton, IA
- Bob Prescott, end and kicker, sophomore, No. 86, 6–3, 200 pounds, Sioux City, IA
- Frank Rigney, tackle, junior, No. 75, 6–4, 212 pounds, East St. Louis, IL
- Don Suchy, center, senior, No. 55, 6–0, 203 pounds, Belle Plaine, IA
- Dick Theer, guard, junior, No. 62, 6–3, 204 pounds, Davenport, IA
- Gene Veit, quarterback, junior, No. 26, 5–11, 177 pounds, Clinton, IA
- Marion Walker, fullback, senior, No. 31, 5–8, 177 pounds, Gary, IN
- Jim Willett, tackle, senior, No. 94, 6–4, 221 pounds, Manson, IA

=== Coaches and administrators ===
- Head coach - Forest Evashevski
- Assistant coaches - Jerry Burns, Bump Elliott, Bob Flora, Jerry Hilgenberg (freshman coach), Archie Kodros, Henry "Whitey" Piro
- Athletic director - Paul Brechler
- Trainer - Doyle Allsum
- Team physician - Dr. W. D. Paul

== Rankings ==
Ranking movements Legend: ██ Increase in ranking ██ Decrease in ranking — = Not ranked ( ) = First-place votes
| | Week | | | | | | | | | | | |
| Poll | Pre | 1 | 2 | 3 | 4 | 5 | 6 | 7 | 8 | 9 | 10 | Final |
|---|---|---|---|---|---|---|---|---|---|---|---|---|
| AP | — | — | 20 | — | 12 | 12 | 7 | 15 | 7 | 3 (6) | 3 (12) | 3 (15) |
| Coaches | | | | | | | | | | | | 3 (3) |

== Game summaries ==
=== Indiana ===
Iowa at Indiana

| Team | 1 | 2 | 3 | 4 | Total |
|---|---|---|---|---|---|
| • Hawkeyes | 13 | 0 | 7 | 7 | 27 |
| Hoosiers | 0 | 0 | 0 | 0 | 0 |

- Date: September 29
- Location: Memorial Stadium, Bloomington, Indiana
- Game attendance: 25,000

On September 29, 1956, Iowa defeated Indiana, 27–0, before a crowd of 25,000 at Memorial Stadium in Bloomington, Indiana. Iowa scored two touchdowns in the first quarter off an Indiana fumble and an interception. Iowa rushed for 242 yards to 76 yards for Indiana.

=== Oregon State ===
Oregon State at Iowa

| Team | 1 | 2 | 3 | 4 | Total |
|---|---|---|---|---|---|
| Beavers | 6 | 0 | 7 | 0 | 13 |
| • Hawkeyes | 0 | 0 | 0 | 14 | 14 |

- Date: October 6
- Location: Iowa Stadium, Iowa City, Iowa
- Game attendance: 41,027

On October 6, Iowa (ranked No. 20 in the AP Poll) defeated Oregon State, 14–13, before a crowd of 41,027 at Iowa Stadium in Iowa City. The game matched the same teams that met again in the 1957 Rose Bowl. Oregon State scored on its second play from scrimmage on a 30-yard pass, but the extra point attempt was blocked. Oregon State scored again in the third quarter on a 49-yard run by Paul Lowe and led, 13–0, at the start of the fourth quarter. Iowa threw two touchdown passes in a span of six minutes in the fourth quarter to secure the victory.

=== Wisconsin ===
Wisconsin at Iowa

| Team | 1 | 2 | 3 | 4 | Total |
|---|---|---|---|---|---|
| Badgers | 0 | 0 | 0 | 7 | 7 |
| • Hawkeyes | 0 | 6 | 7 | 0 | 13 |

- Date: October 13
- Location: Iowa Stadium, Iowa City, Iowa
- Game attendance: 53,273

On October 13, Iowa defeated Wisconsin, 13–7, before a crowd of 53,273 at Iowa Stadium. With only a minute remaining in the first half, Iowa drove 84 yards, running eight plays in 59 seconds and scoring on a pitchout from Ken Ploen to Mike Hagler. Iowa scored again on the first drive of the second half on a short run by Ploen, taking a 13–0 lead.

=== Hawaii ===
Hawaii at Iowa

| Team | 1 | 2 | 3 | 4 | Total |
|---|---|---|---|---|---|
| Rainbows | 0 | 0 | 0 | 0 | 0 |
| • Hawkeyes | 0 | 14 | 14 | 6 | 34 |

- Date: October 20
- Location: Iowa Stadium, Iowa City, Iowa
- Game attendance: 40,000

On October 20, Iowa defeated Hawaii, 34–0, at Iowa Stadium in Iowa City. Iowa led, 14–0, at halftime and played second, third and fourth-string players in the second half, with a total of 42 Hawkeyes seeing game action. Iowa rushed for 266 yards and held Hawaii to 67 rushing yards.

=== Purdue ===
Iowa at Purdue

| Team | 1 | 2 | 3 | 4 | Total |
|---|---|---|---|---|---|
| • Hawkeyes | 7 | 14 | 0 | 0 | 21 |
| Boilermakers | 7 | 7 | 0 | 6 | 20 |

- Date: October 27
- Location: Ross–Ade Stadium, West Lafayette, Indiana
- Game attendance: 41,415

On October 27, Iowa (ranked No. 12 in the AP Poll) defeated Purdue, 21–20, before a crowd of 41,415 at Ross–Ade Stadium in West Lafayette. Purdue quarterback Len Dawson threw two touchdown passes, and Mel Dillard ran for a third. Iowa also scored three touchdowns, with the difference being a missed extra point. Purdue drove into Iowa territory late in the game, but Purdue fumbled at the 25-yard line with a minute and a half remaining in the game.

=== No. 17 Michigan ===
No. 17 Michigan at No. 7 Iowa

| Team | 1 | 2 | 3 | 4 | Total |
|---|---|---|---|---|---|
| • No. 17 Wolverines | 3 | 0 | 7 | 7 | 17 |
| No. 7 Hawkeyes | 0 | 14 | 0 | 0 | 14 |

- Date: November 3
- Location: Iowa Stadium, Iowa City, Iowa
- Game attendance: 55,896

On November 3, Michigan (ranked No. 17 in the AP Poll) defeated Iowa (ranked No. 7 in the AP Poll) by a 17–14 score before a crowd of 58,137 at Iowa Stadium in Iowa City. The loss was the only one of the year for Iowa. Iowa had not beaten Michigan since 1924. Michigan took a 3–0 lead in the first quarter on a field goal by Ron Kramer. Iowa then scored two touchdowns and led, 14–3, at halftime. One of the Iowa touchdowns was set up when Michigan's quarterback was sacked and fumbled with Alex Karras recovering the ball for Iowa. Michigan's third-string halfback, Mike Shatusky, scored two touchdowns in the second half, a three-yard run in the third quarter and a two-yard plunge with one minute and six seconds remaining in the game.

=== at No. 6 Minnesota ===
No. 15 Iowa at No. 6 Minnesota

| Team | 1 | 2 | 3 | 4 | Total |
|---|---|---|---|---|---|
| • No. 15 Hawkeyes | 7 | 0 | 0 | 0 | 7 |
| No. 6 Golden Gophers | 0 | 0 | 0 | 0 | 0 |

- Date: November 10
- Location: Memorial Stadium, Minneapolis, Minnesota
- Game attendance: 64,235

On November 10, Iowa (ranked No. 15 in the AP Poll) defeated Minnesota (ranked No. 6), 7–0, before a crowd of 64,235 at Memorial Stadium in Minneapolis. Iowa coach implemented a 6-3-2 defense to contain Minnesota's speedy Bobby Cox. After the game, Cox noted: "I couldn't go outside. They forced me to go inside and then some linebacker would nail me." The outcome put Iowa into the lead in the race for the conference's Rose Bowl bid. After the game, Iowa's players carried coach Evashevski off the field on their shoulders.

=== No. 6 Ohio State ===
No. 6 Ohio State at No. 7 Iowa

| Team | 1 | 2 | 3 | 4 | Total |
|---|---|---|---|---|---|
| No. 6 Buckeyes | 0 | 0 | 0 | 0 | 0 |
| • No. 7 Hawkeyes | 0 | 0 | 6 | 0 | 6 |

- Date: November 17
- Location: Iowa Stadium, Iowa City, Iowa
- Game attendance: 57,732
- Game weather: 39 °F (4 °C), Clear, 5-8 mph wind from SW

Scoring summary
| 3 | IOWA | Gilmore 1 yard rush (Prescott kick failed) | IOWA 6–0 |

On November 17, Iowa (ranked No. 7 in the AP Poll) defeated Ohio State (ranked No. 6), 6–0, before a crowd of 57,732 at Iowa Stadium. Ohio State went into the game with the second best rushing attack in the country but were held to 147 rushing yards, their lowest rushing yardage total in two years. The result broke Ohio State's winning streak of 17 games against conference opponents and clinched for Iowa the conference championship and a berth in the Rose Bowl. After time expired, Iowa fans hauled down the goal posts and paraded through Iowa City.

=== Notre Dame ===
Notre Dame at No. 3 Iowa

| Team | 1 | 2 | 3 | 4 | Total |
|---|---|---|---|---|---|
| Fighting Irish | 0 | 0 | 8 | 0 | 8 |
| • No. 3 Hawkeyes | 14 | 14 | 7 | 13 | 48 |

- Date: November 24
- Location: Iowa Stadium, Iowa City, Iowa
- Game attendance: 56,632

On November 24, Iowa (ranked No. 3) defeated Notre Dame, 48–8, before a crowd of 56,632 at Iowa Stadium. The victory, combined with Ohio State's loss, gave Iowa its first undisputed Big Ten championship since 1922. Iowa's 48 points was the fourth highest total allowed by a Notre Dame football team to that point in the program's history. Paul Hornung sprained a thumb 10 minutes into the game and did not return. Iowa rushed for 409 yards and scored on runs of 10 and 41 yards by Ken Ploen, 23 and 61 yards by Fred Harris, and 54 yards by Mike Hagler.

=== vs. No. 10 Oregon State (Rose Bowl) ===
No. 10 Oregon State vs. No. 3 Iowa

| Team | 1 | 2 | 3 | 4 | Total |
|---|---|---|---|---|---|
| No. 10 Beavers | 0 | 6 | 6 | 7 | 19 |
| • No. 3 Hawkeyes | 14 | 7 | 7 | 7 | 35 |

- Date: January 1
- Location:
  Rose Bowl (stadium)
  Pasadena, CA
- Game attendance: 100,000
- TV announcers (NBC): Mel Allen and Lee Giroux

Scoring summary
| 1 | Iowa | Ken Ploen 49-yard run (Prescott kick) | Iowa 7-0 |
| 1 | Iowa | Collins Hagler 9-yard run (Prescott kick) | Iowa 14-0 |
| 2 | OSU | Tom Berry 3-yard run (kick failed) | Iowa 14-6 |
| 2 | Iowa | Bill Happel 5-yard run (Prescott kick) | Iowa 21-6 |
| 3 | Iowa | Collins Hagler 66-yard run (Prescott kick) | Iowa 28-6 |
| 3 | OSU | Nub Beamer 1-yard run (kick failed) | Iowa 28-12 |
| 4 | Iowa | Jim Gibbons 16-yard pass from Ken Ploen (Prescott kick) | Iowa 35-12 |
| 4 | OSU | Sterling Hammack 35-yard pass from Joe Francis (Beamer run) | Iowa 35-19 |

On January 1, 1957, Iowa defeated Oregon State, 35–19, in the 1957 Rose Bowl. Iowa scored five touchdowns, including a 49-yard touchdown run by Ken Ploen and a 66-yard touchdown run by Collins Hagler.

== Postseason awards ==
Three Iowa players were picked by the Associated Press (AP) and/or the United Press (UP) as first-team players on the 1956 All-Big Ten Conference football team. They were quarterback Ken Ploen (AP-1, UP-1), end Frank Gilliam (AP-1, UP-1), tackle Alex Karras (AP-1, UP-1), and center Don Suchy (AP-2, UP-1).

Karras also received first-team honors on the 1956 All-America team from the AP, the Football Writers Association of America, and the Central Press.

On December 3, 1956, both the AP and UP released their final college football polls. Both organizations ranked undefeated Oklahoma at the No. 1 spot with Iowa at No. 3.

On December 4, 1956, the Heisman Trophy was awarded to Paul Hornung of Notre Dame. Ploen placed ninth in the voting.

On December 16, 1957, Ploen received the Chicago Tribune Silver Football trophy as the most valuable player in the Big Ten.

== 1957 NFL draft ==
Four Iowa players were selected in the 1957 NFL draft, as follows:

| Player | Position | Round | Pick | NFL club |
|---|---|---|---|---|
| Frank Gilliam | End | 7 | 76 | Green Bay Packers |
| Dan Dobrino | Back | 10 | 117 | Washington Redskins |
| John Nocera | Back | 16 | 182 | Philadelphia Eagles |
| Ken Ploen | Quarterback | 19 | 222 | Cleveland Browns |
