= 1956 Wisconsin Badgers football team =

American college football season

1956 Wisconsin Badgers football
- Conference: Big Ten Conference
- Record: 1–5–3 (0–4–3 Big Ten)
- Head coach: Milt Bruhn (1st season)
- MVP: Dave Howard
- Captain: Pat Levenhagen
- Home stadium: Camp Randall Stadium

1956 Big Ten Conference football standings
	Conf.					Overall
Team	W		L		T	W		L		T
No. 3 Iowa $	5	–	1	–	0	9	–	1	–	0
No. 7 Michigan	5	–	2	–	0	7	–	2	–	0
No. 12 Minnesota	4	–	1	–	2	6	–	1	–	2
No. 9 Michigan State	4	–	2	–	0	7	–	2	–	0
No. 15 Ohio State	4	–	2	–	0	6	–	3	–	0
Northwestern	3	–	3	–	1	4	–	4	–	1
Purdue	1	–	4	–	2	3	–	4	–	2
Illinois	1	–	4	–	2	2	–	5	–	2
Wisconsin	0	–	4	–	3	1	–	5	–	3
Indiana	1	–	5	–	0	3	–	6	–	0
$ – Conference champion; Rankings from AP Poll

The 1956 Wisconsin Badgers football team was an American football team that represented the University of Wisconsin in the 1956 Big Ten Conference football season. In their first season under head coach Milt Bruhn, the Badgers compiled an overall record of 1–5–3 record with a mark of 0–4–3 in conference play, placing ninth in the Big Ten.

The team's statistical leaders included Richard Simonson with 219 passing yards, Danny Lewis with 554 rushing yards, and Dave Howard with 247 receiving yards. Dave Howard was selected as the team's most valuable player.

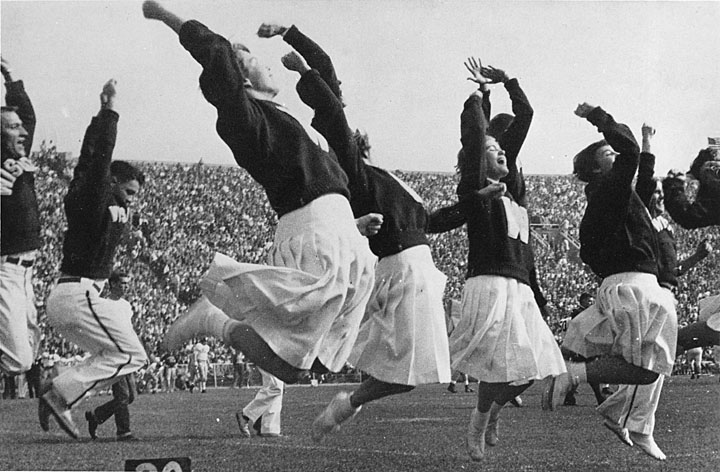
According to the UW yearbook, 1956 was the first year for female cheerleaders at a football game ("Dad's Day", versus Purdue)

== Schedule ==
Date	Opponent	Site	Result	Attendance
September 29	Marquette*	Camp Randall Stadium; Madison, WI	W 41–0	52,700
October 6	No. 10 USC*	Camp Randall Stadium; Madison, WI	L 6–13	52,979
October 13	at Iowa	Iowa Stadium; Iowa City, IA (rivalry)	L 7–13	53,273
October 20	No. 17 Purdue	Camp Randall Stadium; Madison, WI	T 6–6	53,044
October 27	at No. 9 Ohio State	Ohio Stadium; Columbus, OH	L 0–21	82,661
November 3	at No. 4 Michigan State	Macklin Stadium; East Lansing, MI	L 0–33	53,647
November 10	Northwestern^{†}	Camp Randall Stadium; Madison, WI	L 7–17	54,645
November 17	at Illinois	Memorial Stadium; Champaign, IL	T 13–13	52,858
November 24	No. 7 Minnesota	Camp Randall Stadium; Madison, WI (rivalry)	T 13–13	54,149
*Non-conference game; ^{†}Homecoming; Rankings from AP Poll released prior to the game

== Preseason ==
In December 1955, Wisconsin head coach Ivy Williamson was promoted to athletic director. He appointed Milt Bruhn as the school's new head football coach. Bruhn had been a lineman on Minnesota's undefeated 1934 and 1935 national championship teams and had been Wisconsin's line coach since 1949.

== Game summaries ==
On September 29, 1956, Wisconsin defeated Marquette, 41–0, before a crowd of 52,700 at Camp Randall Stadium in Madison, Wisconsin. Wisconsin totaled 441 rushing yards to 43 for Marquette.

On October 6, USC defeated Wisconsin, 13–6, before a crowd of 52,979 at Camp Randall Stadium in Madison. USC's All-American halfback Jon Arnett rushed for 182 yards on 25 carries.

On October 13, Iowa defeated Wisconsin, 13–7, before a crowd of 53,273 at Iowa Stadium. With only a minute remaining in the first half, Iowa drove 84 yards, running eight plays in 59 seconds and scoring on a pitchout from Ken Ploen to Mike Hagler. Iowa scored again on the first drive of the second half on a short run by Ploen, taking a 13–0 lead.

On October 20, Purdue and Wisconsin played to a 6–6 tie before a Dad's Day crowd of 53,094 at Camp Randall Stadium in Madison. Danny Lewis ran 30 yards for a Wisconsin touchdown in the first quarter, and Len Dawson threw a touchdown pass to Lamar Lundy in the second quarter. Neither team converted its extra point.

On October 27, Ohio State defeated Wisconsin, 21–0, before a crowd of 82,661 at Ohio Stadium in Columbus. The victory was Ohio State's 16th in a row against a Big Ten opponent, tying a conference opponent.

On November 3, Michigan State (ranked No. 4 in the AP Poll) defeated Wisconsin, 33–0, before a crowd of 53,647 at Macklin Stadium in East Lansing. Michigan State totaled 352 rushing yards and 168 passing yards. The result was Wisconsin's worst defeat since 1949.

On November 10, Northwestern defeated Wisconsin, 17–7, before a homecoming crowd of 54,645 spectators at Camp Randall Stadium in Madison. The attendance was the highest in the history of Camp Randall Stadium to that point. Northwestern's first touchdown of the game was scored by center Ted Ringer when he recovered a loose ball in the end zone following a fumble by teammate Wilmer Fowler. The outcome was Northwestern's first conference victory under Ara Parseghian.

On November 17, Illinois and Wisconsin played to a 13–13 tie before a crowd of 52,858 at Memorial Stadium in Champaign. Illinois led 13–6 at halftime. With slightly more than three minutes left in the game, Wisconsin end Sidney Williams threw a 34-yard pass to Danny Lewis on the nine-yard line, setting up a touchdown run on the next play. Williams' pass was his first of the season.

On November 24, in the annual battle for Paul Bunyan's Axe, Minnesota (ranked No. 7 in the AP Poll) and Wisconsin played to a 13–13 tie before a crowd of 54,149 at Camp Randall Stadium in Madison. On the final play of the game, Wisconsin's Jon Hobbs missed his third field goal attempt of the game. Wisconsin finished the season without a conference win for the first time since 1939.

== 1957 NFL draft ==
The following Wisconsin players were selected in the 1957 NFL draft:

Player	Position	Round	Pick	NFL club
Glenn Bestor	Back	12	145	Green Bay Packers
Marty Booher	Tackle	27	316	Green Bay Packers
