= Dennis Mendyk =

American football and baseball player (1935–2025)

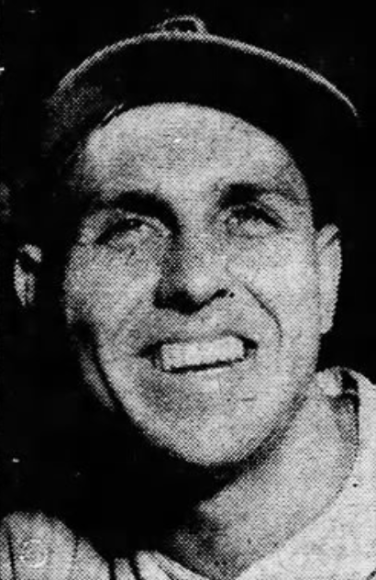
- Mendyk in 1958

Profile
- Position: Halfback

Personal information
- Born: January 16, 1935; Flint, Michigan, U.S.
- Died: July 30, 2025 (aged 90); Murrieta, California, U.S.
- Listed height: 6 ft 1 in (1.85 m)

Career information
- College: Michigan State
- NFL draft: 1957: 3rd round, 35th overall pick
- Baseball career
- Outfielder, third baseman, first baseman
- Bats: Right Throws: Right

Career statistics
- Batting average: .240

Teams
- Erie Sailors (1957, 1959); Decatur Commodores (1958); Durham Bulls (1958); Salem Senators (1960)

Dennis Arthur Mendyk (January 16, 1935 – July 30, 2025), also known as Dennis the Menace and Dennis the Mennis, was an American football and baseball player.

== Life and career ==
Mendyk was born in Flint, Michigan, the son of Clarence Mendyk. He attended Michigan State University.

Mendyk played for the Michigan State Spartans football team in 1956. The next year, he was selected by the New York Giants in the 3rd round of the 1957 NFL Draft; he did not make the final roster.

Mendyk played in Minor League Baseball from 1957 to 1960.

== Death ==
Mendyk died in Murrieta, California on July 30, 2025, at the age of 90.
