= Dick Hill (gridiron football) =

American gridiron football player (born 1934)

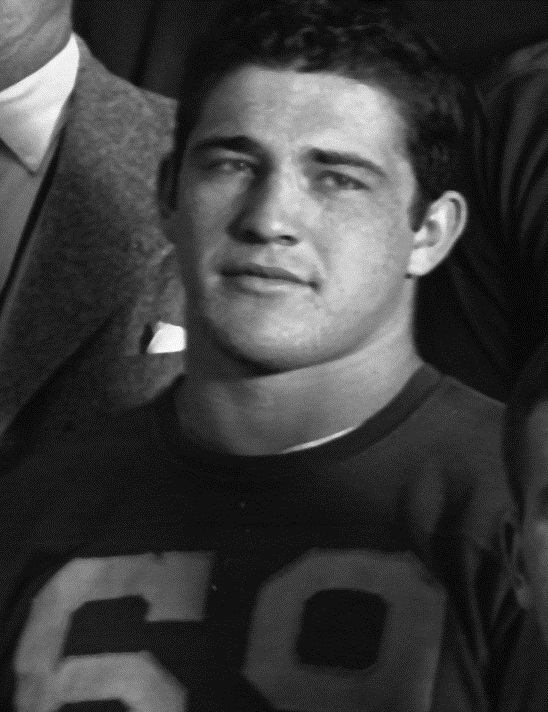
- Hill from 1955 Michigan team portrait

Profile
- Position: Guard

Personal information
- Born: October 10, 1934 (age 92)

Career information
- College: Michigan

Career history
- Montreal Alouettes (1957)

Awards and highlights
- First-team All-Big Ten (1956)

Richard F. Hill (born October 10, 1934) is an American former football lineman. He played professional football for the Montreal Alouettes of the Canadian Football League (CFL). He also played college football for the University of Michigan from 1954 to 1956 and was selected as the most valuable player on the 1956 Michigan Wolverines football team.

Hill grew up in Gary, Indiana, and enrolled at the University of Michigan in 1953. He played on the all-freshman team in 1953 and was a backup player for the 1954 team. As a junior, Hill started all nine games at left guard for the 1955 Michigan Wolverines football team. The team finished the season with a 7–2 record and was ranked No. 12 and No. 13 in the final AP and UPI polls.

As a senior, Hill again started all nine games at left guard for the 1956 Michigan team, and he was selected as that team's most valuable player. The team compiled a 7–2 record and finished with a No. 7 ranking in both the AP and UPI polls. After the season was over, Hill was selected to play for the North team in the annual North-South Shrine Game at the Orange Bowl.

In June 1957, Hill signed a contract to play for the Montreal Alouettes in the Canadian Football League. He played with the Alouettes during the part of the 1957 season. Hill was cut by the Alouettes in September 1956, as he was preparing to enter the United States Army.
