= Vic Zucco =

American football player (born 1935)

No. 48
- Position: Defensive back

Personal information
- Born: September 4, 1935; Renton, Pennsylvania, U.S.
- Died: February 15, 2020 (aged 84); Williamsburg, Michigan, U.S.
- Listed height: 6 ft 0 in (1.83 m)
- Listed weight: 187 lb (85 kg)

Career information
- High school: Plum (Plum, Pennsylvania)
- College: Wayne State (1953-1954); Michigan State (1955-1956)
- NFL draft: 1957: 5th round, 60th overall pick

Career history
- Chicago Bears (1957–1960)

Career NFL statistics
- Interceptions: 8
- Fumble recoveries: 2
- Touchdowns: 1
- Stats at Pro Football Reference

Victor A. Zucco (September 4, 1935 – February 15, 2020) is an American former professional football player who was a defensive back for four seasons the Chicago Bears of the National Football League (NFL). He played college football for the Wayne State Warriors and Michigan State Spartans.

== Early life ==
Zucco attended Plum Township High School in Unity, Pennsylvania, earning back-to-back Pittsburgh Sun-Telegraph All-Western Pennsylvania Interscholastic Athletic League (WPIAL) Class B honors in his junior and senior seasons. He also participated in basketball and track and field, winning the WPIAL Class B titles in the 100-yard dash, the 220-yard dash, and the broad jump in 1952.

== College career ==
Zucco was convinced to attend Wayne State University by Dick Brown, a former quarterback on the football team who had transitioned into a role on the coaching staff. At Wayne State, Zucco won two letters in football and one in track and field. As a freshman in 1953, he set a new program record by rushing for 228 yards on 10 carries in a 33–13 victory over Washington University; he also tied the program record with three touchdown runs. Zucco led the Warriors in both rushing and total offense in both seasons, although his sophomore season was shortened due to injury. However, he withdrew from the school after the firing of the team's head coach, Lou Zarza.

Zucco transferred to Michigan State University in 1955 after Wayne State joined the Presidents' Athletic Conference, whose members did not offer athletic scholarships. Due to Big Ten Conference rules, he was forced to sit out the year and instead spent the season with the scout team. In 1956, Zucco began the season playing mostly on defense for the Spartans, and earned more time on offense as the season went on. Zucco was selected to play both the North–South Shrine Game and the Senior Bowl. He recorded an interception in each game.

Zucco was inducted into the Wayne State Athletic Hall of Fame in 1990.

== Professional career ==
Zucco was selected 60th overall by the Chicago Bears in the fifth round of the 1957 NFL draft. He was a four-year starter at defensive halfback and return specialist, retiring following the 1960 season.
