= Gene Cichowski =

American football player (1934–2025)

No. 20, 40, 12
- Position: Defensive back

Personal information
- Born: May 20, 1934; Chicago, Illinois, U.S.
- Died: March 24, 2025 (aged 90); Wheeling, Illinois, U.S.
- Listed height: 6 ft 0 in (1.83 m)
- Listed weight: 195 lb (88 kg)

Career information
- High school: Lane Tech (Chicago)
- College: Indiana
- NFL draft: 1957: 21st round, 246th overall pick

Career history
- Pittsburgh Steelers (1957); Washington Redskins (1958–1959); Calgary Stampeders (1960–1961)

Career NFL statistics
- Fumble recoveries: 1
- Stats at Pro Football Reference

Eugene Walter "Chick" Cichowski (May 20, 1934 – March 24, 2025) was an American professional football cornerback in the National Football League (NFL) for the Pittsburgh Steelers and the Washington Redskins. He played quarterback at Indiana University and was drafted in the 21st round of the 1957 NFL draft. He also played semi-pro football in the American Football Association (AFA) and in the Canadian Football League (CFL). He was inducted into the AFA Hall of Fame in 2009. He coached at New Trier High School in Illinois for 20 years with an overall record of 145–47–1. Cichowski was later inducted into the Illinois Football Coaches Association Hall of Fame. He coached Clay Matthews Jr. in his senior season at New Trier. He later worked in scouting for the Baltimore Ravens and New York Jets. Cichowski died on March 24, 2025, at the age of 90.
