= Jim Pace (gridiron football) =

American football player (1936–1983)

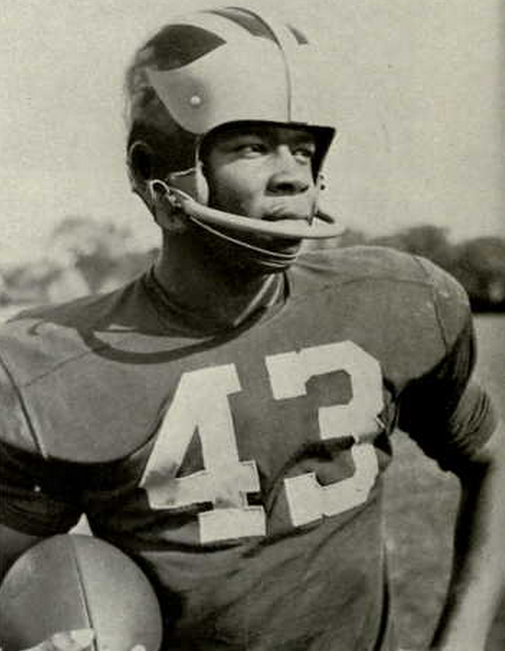
- Pace, c. 1957

No. 43, 30
- Position: Halfback

Personal information
- Born: January 1, 1936; Little Rock, Arkansas, U.S.
- Died: March 4, 1983 (aged 47); Culver City, California, U.S.
- Listed height: 6 ft 0 in (1.83 m)
- Listed weight: 195 lb (88 kg)

Career information
- High school: Dunbar (Little Rock)
- College: Michigan (1954–1957)
- NFL draft: 1958: 1st round, 8th overall pick

Career history
- San Francisco 49ers (1958); Oakland Raiders (1961)*; Washington Redskins (1962)*; New York Giants (1963)*; Hamilton Tiger-Cats (1963); Oakland Raiders (1964)*; Pittsburgh Steelers (1965)*
- * Offseason or practice squad member only

Awards and highlights
- Grey Cup champion (1963); First-team All-American (1957); Chicago Tribune Silver Football (1957); First-team All-Big Ten (1957)

Career NFL statistics
- Rushing yards: 161
- Rushing average: 3.1
- Receptions: 10
- Receiving yards: 59
- Total touchdowns: 2
- Stats at Pro Football Reference

James Edward Pace (January 1, 1936 – March 4, 1983) was an American professional football player who was a running back for the San Francisco 49ers of the National Football League (NFL). He played college football for the Michigan Wolverines, earning first-team All-American honors playing halfback in 1957.

== Early life ==
Although he was born in Little Rock, Arkansas, Pace was raised in Grand Rapids, Michigan. He played sandlot football with Terry Barr. In high school, Pace was a football and track star from 1950 to 1954. In track, he ran a time of a 9.6 seconds in the 100 yard dash at Dunbar High School.

== College career ==
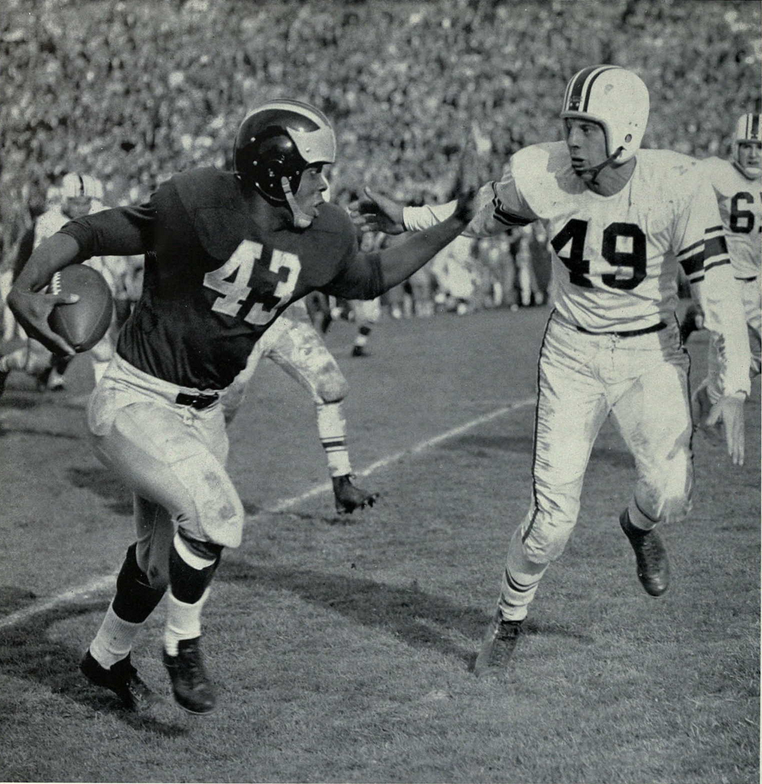
Pace stiff-arms Ollie Lindborg of Northwestern, 1955

Pace attended the University of Michigan and played for the Michigan Wolverines football. He was named the Most Valuable Player on the Michigan football team. He was also awarded the Chicago Tribune Silver Football as the Most Valuable Player in the Big Ten Conference. He also ran track at Michigan and won the Big Ten 60-yard indoor dash title. In 1957, he scored ten touchdowns: seven rushing, two receiving, and one punt return. He accumulated almost 800 yards of total offense in 1957 (664 rushing, 122 receiving and 98 on punt returns) and averaged 5.4 yards per carry rushing. In the 1957 Michigan-Ohio State game, Pace rushed for 164 yards and caught a 14-yard pass, which was at that time the Michigan record for rushing yards against Ohio State. Pace played in the 1957 East–West Shrine Game. He was also selected by the Associated Press as a first-team player on the 1957 College Football All-America Team.

== Professional career ==
Pace was the eighth overall pick in the first round of the 1958 NFL draft. but played just one season for the San Francisco 49ers. He later played for the Hamilton Tiger-Cats of the Canadian Football League before retiring in 1963.

After retiring from football, Pace was an AFL administrative assistant from 1964 to 1966, an Oakland football scout, an actor in TV commercials and a school administrator in Los Angeles. He died at age 47 in Culver City, California.

== See also ==
- List of Michigan Wolverines football All-Americans
