= John Matsko (gridiron football player) =

American football player (1933–2010)

No. 45
- Position: Center

Personal information
- Born: December 20, 1933; Pennsylvania, U.S.
- Died: December 24, 2010 (aged 77); Johnstown, Pennsylvania, U.S.
- Listed height: 5 ft 10 in (1.78 m)
- Listed weight: 205 lb (93 kg)

Career history
- Calgary Stampeders (1959)

Awards and highlights
- Second-team All-American (1956); First-team All-Big Ten (1956)

John Matsko Jr. (December 20, 1933 – December 24, 2010) was an American football player. He played Center for the Michigan State Spartans football team and was selected as a first-team All-Big Ten Conference player and second-team All-American in 1956.

Matsko grew up in Cambria County, Pennsylvania. He attended Adams-Summerhill High School in St. Michael, Pennsylvania, and won a total of 12 varsity letters in football, baseball, basketball and track. He was offered a contract to play professional baseball for the Pittsburgh Pirates, but opted to play college football at Michigan State College.

Matsko played at the center position at Michigan State and also handled place-kicking for the team. He was captain of the 1956 Michigan State Spartans football team that compiled a 9–1 record and was ranked #9 in the final AP Poll. At the end of the season, he was selected by the United Press (UP), International News Service (INS), and Newspaper Enterprise Association (NEA) as a second-team player on the 1956 College Football All-America Team. He was also selected by the Associated Press (AP) as a first-team player on the 1956 All-Big Ten Conference football team. The United Press (UP) selected him as the second-team All-Big Ten center.

In August 1957, Matsko played for the college all-stars in Chicago and was in discussions with the Hamilton Tiger-Cats of the Canadian Football League (CFL). He ultimately played for the Calgary Stampeders during the 1959 CFL season.

In 1960, after retiring from professional football, Matsko was hired as a junior high school social studies teacher and assistant football coach in Ferndale, Pennsylvania.
