= John Herrnstein =

American baseball and football player (1938–2017)

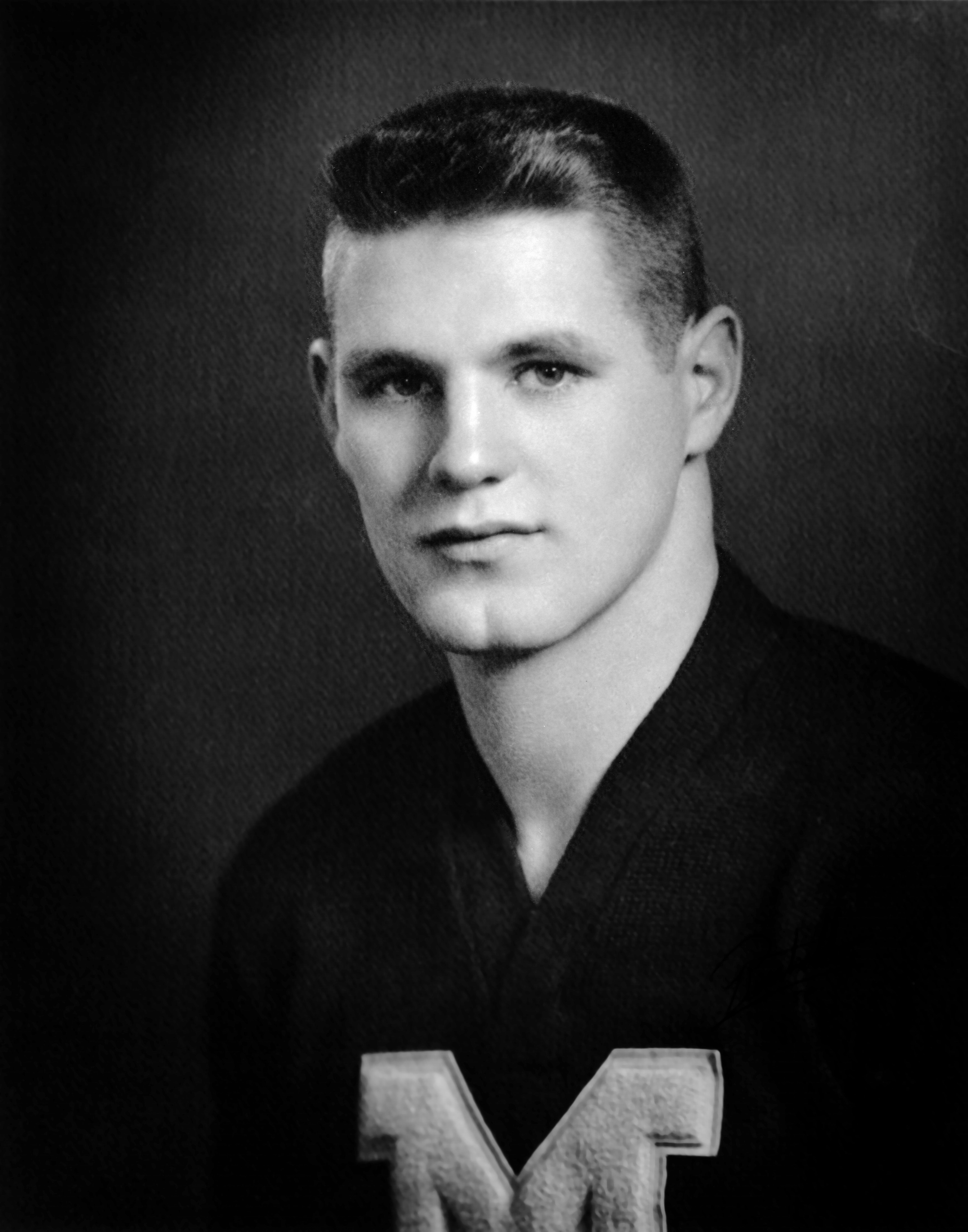
- Herrnstein in 1958
- Left fielder / First baseman
- Born: March 31, 1938; Hampton, Virginia, U.S.
- Died: October 3, 2017 (aged 79); Chillicothe, Ohio, U.S.
- Batted: Left Threw: Left

MLB debut
- September 15, 1962, for the Philadelphia Phillies

Last MLB appearance
- July 7, 1966, for the Atlanta Braves

MLB statistics
- Batting average: .220
- Home runs: 8
- Runs batted in: 34
- Stats at Baseball Reference

Teams
- Philadelphia Phillies (1962–1966); Chicago Cubs (1966); Atlanta Braves (1966)

John Ellett Herrnstein (March 31, 1938 – October 3, 2017) was an American baseball and football player. He played Major League Baseball from 1962 to 1966 for the Philadelphia Phillies, Chicago Cubs, and Atlanta Braves. He also played college baseball and football at the University of Michigan from 1956 to 1959. He was the captain of the 1958 Michigan Wolverines football team and the third generation of the Herrnstein family to play for a Michigan Wolverines football team. His father, William Herrnstein, Jr., played for the Wolverines from 1923 to 1925, and his grandfather, William Herrnstein, Sr., played for the team in the 1898 and 1900 seasons. His great uncle Albert E. Herrnstein played for Fielding H. Yost's famed "Point-a-Minute" teams in 1901 and 1902.

== University of Michigan ==
Herrnstein attended the University of Michigan where he was a star athlete in both baseball and football. In football, he played fullback on offense and linebacker on defense from 1956 to 1958. As a sophomore, he rushed for 88 yards and a touchdown in his third game against Army and scored three touchdowns in his fourth game against Northwestern. He was the starting fullback on the 1956 Michigan Wolverines football team that finished with a 7–2 record and a #7 ranking in both the Associated Press and United Press International polls. He rushed for 475 net yards on 123 carries, scored seven touchdowns and tied with Terry Barr as Michigan's leading scorer in 1956.

In a preview of the 1957 season, The Sporting News called Herrnstein "Michigan's Big Gun" and a "pounding fullback." During the 1957 football season, an injury to his left foot slowed Herrnstein. He had played 442 minutes as a sophomore, but was limited to 179 minutes in 1957. In December 1957, he was elected by his teammates as the captain of the 1958 Michigan Wolverines football team.

In the 1958 season opener, Herrnstein rushed for a career-high 144 yards and scored two touchdowns against the USC Trojans. However, in the second game, he sustained a hand injury in the first quarter and was sidelined for the rest of the game. In the first quarter of the season's third game, a 20–14 loss to Navy, Herrnstein injured his left knee. He later recounted the play: "I was the linebacker and a Navy blocker hit me from nowhere. That was the third game of the year, but the last one for me. The ligaments in my knee were torn up pretty bad." The knee injury sidelined Herrnstein for the remainder of the 1958 season and ended his football career.

In baseball, Herrnstein played for the Michigan Wolverines baseball team in 1957 and 1958. He batted and threw left-handed, stood 6 feet 3 inches (1.91 m) tall and weighed 215 pounds (98 kg). Michigan baseball coach Ray Fisher called him the Wolverines' best baseball player since Dick Wakefield in the early 1940s.

== Professional baseball ==
=== Signing with the Phillies ===
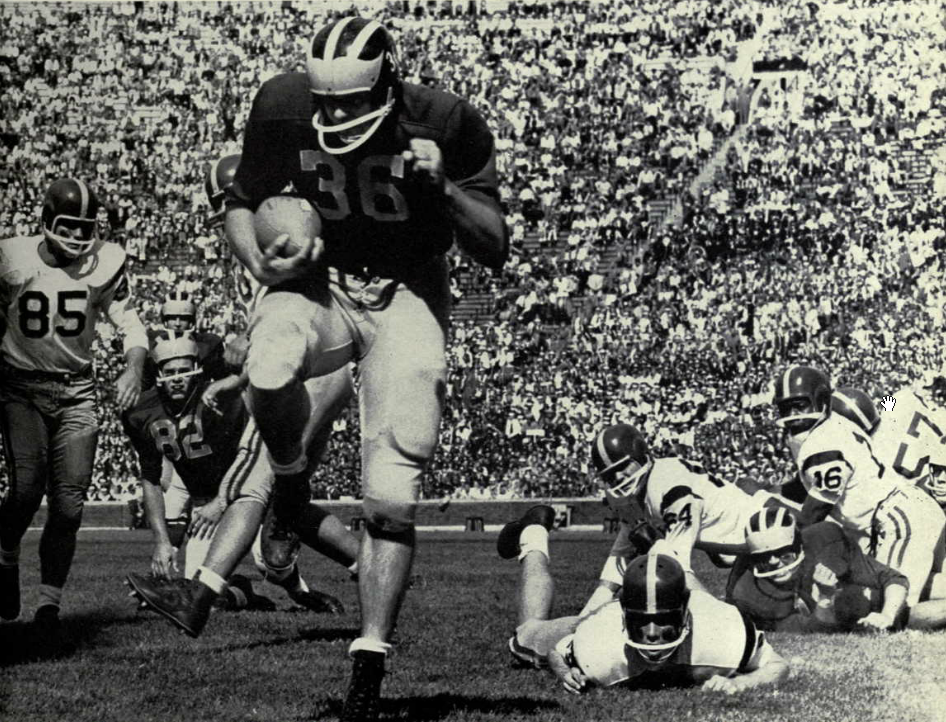
Herrnstein scoring a touchdown against USC, September 1958

Herrnstein had been a highly touted baseball prospect prior to his knee surgery in 1958. He had turned down offers from major league teams in order to attend college. While the knee surgery reduced the interest in Herrnstein among some clubs, the Philadelphia Phillies remained interested and signed him to a contract on December 2, 1958, in exchange for a bonus of $35,000. Herrnstein signed with the Phillies while still a student at Michigan and while recuperating from the knee surgery. He later recalled, "They operated on me right away and the Phillies scout came to me and I signed the contract while I was still in the hospital." At the time, Herrnstein said, "I'll leave school at the end of the semester in January and plan to return in September to finish up."

=== Minor leagues ===
Herrnstein began his professional baseball career in 1959 for the Des Moines Demons in the Illinois–Indiana–Iowa League. He appeared in 105 games, compiling a .244 batting average with 21 doubles, three triples and 10 RBIs, as he helped lead the team to a 78–48 record. Herrnstein later recalled that he was disappointed with his offensive performance at Des Moines: "That first year I didn't think I'd ever hit."

He was promoted to the Eastern League in 1960, where he became a key player for the Williamsport Grays as the team won the 1960 league pennant. Herrnstein hit .305 with 16 home runs, six triples, 11 stolen bases, and 85 RBIs.

Following his strong showing at Williamsport, Herrnstein played in 1961 for the Chattanooga Lookouts in the Southern Association. He appeared in 159 games for the Lookouts and batted .292 with a .365 on-base percentage, 22 doubles, six triples, 17 home runs, and 95 RBIs.

=== 1962 season ===
In 1962, Herrnstein played for the Buffalo Bisons in the International League. He appeared in 148 games and compiled a .293 batting average, .356 on-base percentage, 30 doubles, seven triples, 23 RBIs, and six stolen bases. The Sporting News published a feature story on Herrnstein in June in which it noted his ability to hit effectively off left-handed pitchers:

"A modern rarity -- a lefthanded batter who rips lefthanded pitching -- is Buffalo's candidate for rookie of the year. He is Outfielder John Herrnstein, six feet, four inches and 215 pounds, who runs with a 10.2 sprinter's speed."

Buffalo's manager Kerby Farrell said at the time, "At this stage of his career, Herrnstein has more potential than either Roger Maris or Rocky Colavito", both of whom Farrell had coached in the minor leagues.

In September 1962, he was reacquired by the Phillies from Buffalo. He made his major league debut on September 15, 1962, and over the next two weeks he appeared in eight games for the Phillies, all as a pinch hitter. He had one hit and one RBI in five at-bats.

During the winter of 1962, Herrnstein played for Arecibo in the Puerto Rican League. By mid-December, he was leading the league with nine home runs. He ultimately led the Puerto Rican League with 14 home runs.

=== 1963 season ===
Rumors spread in the spring of 1963 that the Phillies intended to trade Herrnstein to the New York Mets. However, Phillies owner Bob Carpenter quashed the rumors noting, "Herrnstein will not be traded. He's going to be playing for the Phillies one day soon." With Wes Covington, Tony González, and Johnny Callison entrenched in the outfield, the Phillies saw an opportunity for Herrnstein to become their starting first baseman, replacing Roy Sievers. Accordingly, and after a brief stint with the Phillies at the start of the 1963 season, Herrnstein was optioned to the Little Rock Travelers to allow him to try his hand at first base. Herrnstein appeared in 124 games for Little Rock, batting .271 with a .361 on-base percentage, 19 doubles, 22 home runs, and 73 RBIs.

Herrnstein appeared in 15 games as a pinch hitter for the Phillies in 1963. In 12 at-bats, he compiled a .167 batting average. On September 23, 1963, he hit his first major league home run off Don Larsen of the San Francisco Giants. Herrnstein was called into the game as a pinch hitter with two out in the ninth inning. The blow, which flew over the right-center field fence at Candlestick Park, gave the Phillies a 5–4 victory.

=== 1964 season ===
Herrnstein spent the full 1964 season with the Phillies. He got off to a quick start, working his way into the starting lineup after an injury to outfielder Tony González. On April 19, 1964, he played his first game as a starter and hit a single and a home run. In his next game, he hit a two-run, game-winning double down the left field line off Pittsburgh Pirates pitcher, Roy Face. He followed the next night with two doubles and a triple. By the end of April, he was batting over .400 with an on-base percentage over .500.

Herrnstein also began the 1964 season with a solid defensive showing. He initiated a triple play in May on a ground ball from Jerry Grote. Herrnstein fielded the ball, threw to shortstop Bobby Wine for the first out. Wine threw back to Herrnstein for the second out, and Herrnstein threw to catcher Gus Triandos who tagged Rusty Staub attempting to score from second base.

Herrnstein appeared in 125 games for the 1964 Phillies team, including 61 as the team's starting first baseman and 15 games as a starter in the outfield. He compiled a .234 batting average in 1964 with 12 doubles, four triples, six home runs, and 25 RBIs. His batting average in 21 at-bats as a pinch hitter was .333.

=== 1965 season ===
Herrnstein remained with the Phillies throughout the 1965 season, but he saw his playing time reduced to 63 games, only 12 as a starter. Dick Stuart took over as the team's starting first baseman, leaving Herrnstein to be used mostly as a pinch hitter. Herrnstein batted .200 in 85 at-bats with one home run and five RBIs.

=== 1966 season ===
The 1966 season was Herrnstein's final year in professional baseball. He began the season with a strong showing in spring training for the Phillies. He led the team with four home runs in Grapefruit League games. While Herrnstein had won the opening night assignment in left field, he managed only one hit in his first 10 at-bats to open the regular season.

After the slow start, the Phillies dealt Herrnstein to the Chicago Cubs on April 21. Traded along with him was 23-year-old Ferguson Jenkins – later to be inducted into the Baseball Hall of Fame – but then a prospect who had (to that point) only appeared in eight big league games. Herrnstein appeared in only nine games for the Cubs, compiling a .176 batting average in 17 at-bats.

Only one month later (in late May), Herrnstein was traded to the Atlanta Braves in exchange for first baseman Marty Keough. He lasted just 17 games with the Braves, batting .222 in 18 at-bats. His last appearance in a major league game occurred on July 7, 1966.

The Braves assigned Herrnstein to the Richmond Braves in the International League on July 14. Playing for his fourth team in a span of three months, he compiled a .134 batting average in 82 at-bats for Richmond.

In December 1966, Herrnstein was traded by the Braves with Chris Cannizzaro to the Boston Red Sox in exchange for Julio Navarro and Ed Rakow. Nonetheless, he did not play professional baseball after the 1966 season.

== Later years ==
After retiring from baseball, Herrnstein had a career in finance until he retired in 2011. His son, Seth Herrnstein, played college football for the Ohio State Buckeyes.

John Herrnstein died at his home in Chillicothe, Ohio on October 3, 2017, at the age of 79.
