= Lamar Lundy =

American football player (1935–2007)

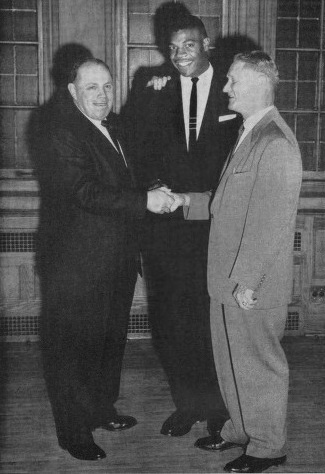
- Lundy receives 1956 Purdue MVP award

No. 85
- Positions: Defensive end, end

Personal information
- Born: April 17, 1935; Richmond, Indiana, U.S.
- Died: February 24, 2007 (aged 71); Richmond, Indiana, U.S.
- Listed height: 6 ft 8 in (2.03 m)
- Listed weight: 245 lb (111 kg)

Career information
- High school: Richmond
- College: Purdue (1953–1956)
- NFL draft: 1957: 4th round, 47th overall pick

Career history

Playing
- Los Angeles Rams (1957–1969)

Coaching
- San Diego Chargers (1971) Tight ends coach

Awards and highlights
- Second-team All-Pro (1967); Pro Bowl (1959); Second-team All-American (1956); 2× Second-team All-Big Ten (1955, 1956)

Career NFL statistics
- Interceptions: 3
- Fumble recoveries: 10
- Sacks: 60.5
- Receptions: 35
- Receiving yards: 584
- Total touchdowns: 9
- Stats at Pro Football Reference

Lamar J. Lundy Jr. (April 17, 1935 – February 24, 2007) was an American professional football player who was a defensive end for 13 seasons with the Los Angeles Rams of the National Football League (NFL) from 1957 to 1969. He played college football for the Purdue Boilermakers and was selected by the Rams in the fourth round of the 1957 NFL draft.

Along with Deacon Jones, Merlin Olsen, and Rosey Grier, Lundy was a member of the Fearsome Foursome, often considered one of the best defensive lines in NFL history. All four also did some acting; Lundy portrayed the boulder-hurling cyclops in the unaired pilot of Lost in Space (this pilot was later made into episode 4 of the series, entitled "There Were Giants in the Earth").

== Early life ==
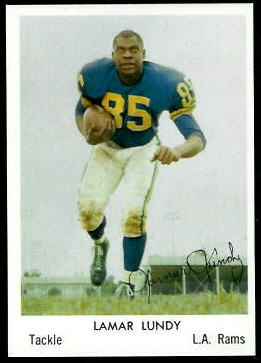
Lundy with the Rams in 1959

Lundy was born in Richmond, Indiana, on April 17, 1935, the first child of Lamar Lundy Sr. and Sarah Corine (Ferguson) Lundy. He attended Nicholson Elementary School and Test Junior High School in Richmond, and graduated from Richmond High School where he was a two-sport star in basketball and football, and was an All-American in both sports. Lundy led the Red Devils to the State Finals in basketball, playing for Hall of Fame Coach, Art Beckner. He was selected to the Indiana Basketball All-Star team that defeated the Kentucky All-Stars in 1953. He was also an All-State player in football. He was All-State in football in 1951 and 1952. The football team was undefeated in 1952 and 1953, and the basketball team went to the final four in 1953. He was named a distinguished alumnus in 1998.

== College ==
When it came time to choose a college, Lamar selected and attended Purdue University, where he was the first black student to receive a football scholarship, and where he was named Most Valuable Player (MVP) of both the football and basketball teams in his senior year. He led the Boilermakers football team in receiving his senior season and was a two-time second-team All-Big Ten end.

As a collegiate basketball player at center, Lamar scored 678 points (73rd all-time for the Boilermakers) and collected 533 rebounds (29th all-time for the Boilermakers). He averaged 10.5 points and 8.5 rebounds per game from 1954 to 1957. He was a third-team All-Big Ten center in 1957.

Lundy was inducted into the Indiana Football Hall of Fame in 1975, the Indiana Basketball Hall of Fame in 1990, and the Purdue Hall of Fame in 1995; being one of only two people inducted into both Indiana's football and basketball Halls of Fame. In June 1968, he was honored by the city of Richmond. Lundy played in the Chicago College All Star game, where college all-stars played an NFL team.

In 2023, the John Purdue Club created the Lundy League, a capital gift society for donors to support Purdue Athletics, and to honor Lundy and his "above and beyond" mentality.

== Professional career ==
At 6 ft 7 in or 6 ft 8 in and 245 or 250 pounds, Lundy was drafted by both NFL and NBA teams, but he opted for a career in football. He was drafted by the St. Louis Hawks in the 1957 NBA draft, and the Los Angeles Rams in the fourth round of the 1957 NFL draft (47th overall). Early in his professional career (1957–1959), Lundy (number 85) played mostly at tight end, catching 35 passes for 584 yards, a 16.7 yards per catch average, and 6 touchdowns. Twenty-five of those receptions were in 1958. He switched to defensive end full time in 1960. He scored an additional 3 touchdowns on interception returns, an NFL record for defensive linemen (and the only 3 interceptions of his NFL career).

He was a member of the Rams "Fearsome Foursome" defensive lines, with Hall of Fame defensive end Deacon Jones, Hall of Fame tackle Merlin Olsen, and originally tackle Roosevelt "Rosey" Grier in the mid-1960s. From 1967 to 1969 tackle Roger Brown became the fourth lineman, with some considering them the most dominant defensive line in NFL history. Jones, a member of the NFL 100th Anniversary All Time Team at defensive end (Olsen holding the same honor at tackle), considered Lundy his mentor in Jones' difficult early years with the Rams. Lundy was on the Rams defense that ended Hall of Fame, and 100th anniversary team member, Baltimore Colts quarterback Johnny Unitas's 47 game touchdown streak.

Lundy played 152 games over thirteen years for the Rams, leading the team in quarterback sacks in 1961, with 60.5 sacks over his Rams' career. He was selected to the Pro Bowl in 1959, and was All -Pro in 1967. When he retired as a player, Lundy became an assistant coach for the San Diego Chargers under Hall of Fame coach Sid Gillman, but was forced by illness to cease coaching.

== Death ==
Lundy died at age 71 on February 24, 2007. He was the first of the Fearsome Foursome to pass away. Lundy was ill with diabetes, Graves disease, myasthenia gravis, cancer, and heart disease. At the time of his death he had 5 children, 19 grandchildren, and 5 great-grandchildren.

== Honors ==
- Selected to play in the 1959 NFL Pro Bowl.
- Selected to the NFL All-Pro team in 1967.
- Inducted into the Indiana Football Hall of Fame in 1975.
- Inducted into the Indiana Basketball Hall of Fame in 1990.
- Inducted into the Purdue University Intercollegiate Athletics Hall of Fame in 1995
- The National Rd. West Bridge, in his hometown of Richmond, Indiana, was renamed "Lamar Lundy Memorial Bridge" in honor of him.
