= Terry Barr =

American football player (1935–2009)

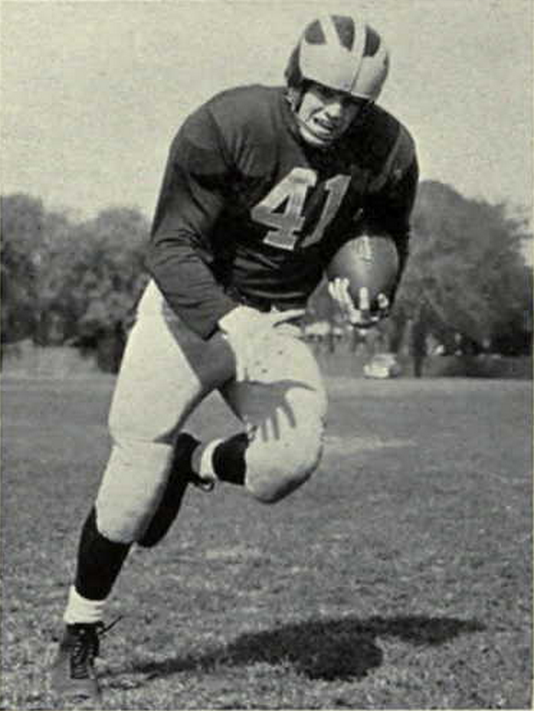
- Barr in 1955

No. 41
- Positions: Halfback, defensive back, flanker

Personal information
- Born: August 10, 1935; Grand Rapids, Michigan, U.S.
- Died: May 28, 2009 (aged 73); Bloomfield Hills, Michigan, U.S.
- Listed height: 6 ft 0 in (1.83 m)
- Listed weight: 189 lb (86 kg)

Career information
- High school: Central (Grand Rapids)
- College: Michigan (1953–1956)
- NFL draft: 1957: 3rd round, 36th overall pick

Career history
- Detroit Lions (1957–1965)

Awards and highlights
- NFL champion (1957); Second-team All-Pro (1963); 2× Pro Bowl (1963, 1964); NFL receiving touchdowns co-leader (1963); First-team All-Big Ten (1956)

Career NFL statistics
- Receptions: 227
- Receiving yards: 3,810
- Receiving touchdowns: 35
- Stats at Pro Football Reference

Terry Albert Barr (August 8, 1935 – May 28, 2009) was an American professional football player for nine seasons with the Detroit Lions of the National Football League (NFL) from 1957 to 1965. He began his NFL career as a defensive back and return specialist and later became one of the best pass receivers in the NFL. He played in the Pro Bowl in both 1963 and 1964, led the NFL with 13 touchdown receptions in 1963, and was among the NFL leaders with 1,086 receiving yards in 1963 and 1,030 receiving yards in 1964. Over his nine-year NFL career, Barr appeared in 102 games and caught 227 passes for 3,810 yards and 35 touchdowns.

Barr also played college football as a halfback for the Michigan Wolverines from 1954 to 1956. He was selected as the most valuable player of their 1955 team and was inducted into the University of Michigan Athletic Hall of Honor in 1994.

== Early life ==
Barr was born in 1935 in Grand Rapids, Michigan. He grew up on the east side of Grand Rapids in a family of ten children. He attended Central High School in Grand Rapids. He played football and basketball and ran track at Central High School and was the Michigan state champion in the 440-yard dash in both 1952 and 1953.

== University of Michigan ==
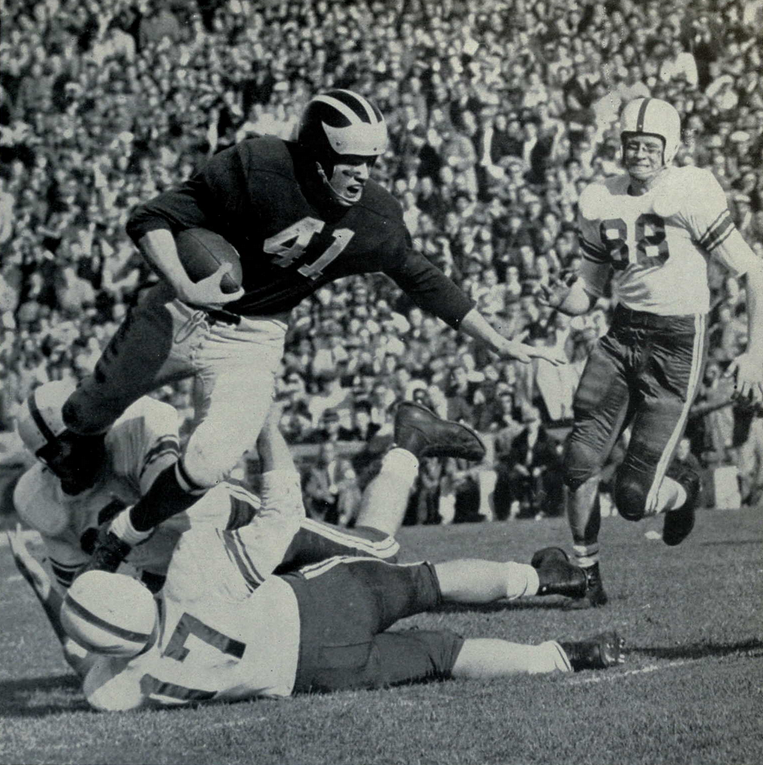
Barr vs. Indiana, 1955

Barr enrolled at the University of Michigan in 1953 and played at the halfback position for Bennie Oosterbaan's Michigan Wolverines football teams from 1954 to 1956. Barr first gained acclaim after leading Michigan to a victory over Army early in the 1955 season; he rushed for a touchdown in the first quarter and then returned a punt 82 yards for a touchdown in the second quarter. At the end of the season, Barr was selected as the Most Valuable Player on the 1955 Michigan Wolverines football team that compiled a 7–2 record and was ranked #12 and #13 in the final AP and UPI polls.

On the 1956 Michigan Wolverines football team Barr was selected as a first-team All-Big Ten player by United Press (UP).

During his junior and senior years from 1955 to 1956, Barr contributed over 1,600 yards to the Wolverines, including 611 rushing yards, 466 punt and kickoff return yards, 306 passing yards, and 140 receiving yards. He was inducted into the University of Michigan Athletic Hall of Honor in 1994.

Barr was a member of the Sigma Chi fraternity and lived with several teammates including Ron Kramer and Tom Maentz at U of M's Theta Theta Chapter.

While at Michigan and during the start of his NFL career, Barr was an officer in the US Army ROTC, trained at the US Armory School at Ft Knox, KY and achieved the rank of Captain as a company tank commander in the US Army Reserves.

== Professional football ==
Barr was selected by the Detroit Lions in the third round (36th overall pick) of the 1957 NFL draft. In his rookie season, he played in the NFL Championship Game. In Detroit's 59–14 win over Cleveland, Barr intercepted a pass and returned it 19 yards for a score. Barr spent nine seasons with the Lions from 1957 to 1965. In his first three seasons, he was used principally as a defensive back and return specialist. He returned 26 kickoffs for 655 yards and 50 punts for 262 yards from 1957 to 1960.

The Lions began using him increasingly on offense in 1960, but he missed a portion of the 1962 season with a knee injury that required surgery.

Barr became one of the best pass receivers in the NFL from 1963 to 1964. In 1963, he led the NFL with 13 touchdown receptions and was invited to play in his first Pro Bowl. He also ranked among the NFL's leaders in 1963 with 13 touchdowns (2nd), 66 receptions (3rd), 1,086 receiving yards (4th), 77.6 receiving yards per game (5th), 78 points scored (7th), and 1,095 yards from scrimmage (7th). In 1964, Barr was again selected to play in the Pro Bowl and again ranked among the NFL leaders with 1,030 receiving yards (2nd), 73.6 receiving yards per game (3rd), 9 receiving touchdowns (4th), 18.1 yards per reception (5th), 57 receptions (7th), and 1,061 yards from scrimmage (7th).

Barr's career ended after the 1965 season due to a knee injury. Over his nine-year NFL career, Barr appeared in 102 games and caught 227 passes for 3,810 yards and 35 touchdowns.

== Later years and family ==
After retiring from football, Barr was involved in several businesses in suburban Detroit. He operated an insurance agency in partnership with Joe Schmidt and Nick Pietrosante for several years. In 1971, he bought a Southfield, Michigan-based company that became Terry Barr Sales L.L.C., which provided sales, marketing, engineering and other services to the automotive industry. He was also the chairman of Libralter Plastics, an automotive industry supplier. His business interests also included a restaurant, several manufacturing operations, commercial real estate and a boys summer camp in northern Michigan. Barr was a past president of the Bloomfield Hills Country Club.

Barr was married, and he and his wife, Shelley, had three sons, Brian, Alan and Terrence. He was inducted into the University of Michigan Athletic Hall of Honor and the Michigan Sports Hall of Fame.

Barr was an avid golfer, fisherman, and duck hunter. He maintained homes in Bloomfield Hills MI, Charlevoix MI, and Boca Grande FL.

In 2005 The Sigma Chi Fraternity honored Barr with the Significant Sig Award.

Barr died in 2009 at age 73 after a long battle with Alzheimer's disease.

== NFL career statistics ==
Legend
	Won the NFL championship
	Led the league
**Bold**	Career high

=== Regular season ===
Year	Team	Games		Receiving				
Year	Team	GP	GS	Rec	Yds	Avg	Lng	TD
1957	DET	12	0	Did not play offense				
1958	DET	12	12	Did not play offense				
1959	DET	11	9	10	180	18.0	45	0
1960	DET	12	4	5	26	5.2	11	1
1961	DET	**14**	**14**	40	630	15.8	61	6
1962	DET	6	6	25	425	17.0	**80**	3
1963	DET	**14**	**14**	**66**	**1,086**	16.5	75	**13**
1964	DET	**14**	**14**	57	1,030	**18.1**	58	9
1965	DET	7	7	24	433	18.0	61	3
Career		102	80	227	3,810	16.8	80	35
