= 1956 All-Big Ten Conference football team =

American college football all-star team

The 1956 All-Big Ten Conference football team consists of American football players chosen by various organizations to the All-Big Ten Conference teams for the 1956 Big Ten Conference football season.

== All-Big Ten selections ==
=== Quarterbacks ===
- Ken Ploen, Iowa (AP-1; UP-1)
- Len Dawson, Purdue (AP-2)
- Bob Cox, Minnesota (UP-2)

=== Halfbacks ===
- Abe Woodson, Illinois (AP-1; UP-1)
- Terry Barr, Michigan (UP-1)
- Bob McKelver, Northwestern (AP-1; UP-2)
- Don Clark, Ohio State (AP-2)
- Clarence Peaks, Michigan State (AP-2; UP-2)

=== Fullbacks ===
- Mel Dillard, Purdue (AP-1; UP-1)
- John Herrnstein, Michigan (AP-2; UP-2)

=== Ends ===
- Ron Kramer, Michigan (AP-1; UP-1)
- Frank Gilliam, Iowa (AP-1; UP-1)
- Lamar Lundy, Purdue (AP-2; UP-2)
- Tom Maentz, Michigan (AP-2; UP-3)
- Brad Bomba, Indiana (UP-2)

=== Tackles ===
- Bob Hobert, Minnesota (AP-1; UP-1)
- Alex Karras, Iowa (AP-1; UP-1)
- Joel Jones, Michigan State (AP-2; UP-2)
- Frank Youso, Minnesota (AP-2)
- Dick Guy, Ohio State (UP-2)

=== Guards ===
- Jim Parker, Ohio State (AP-1; UP-1)
- Dick Hill, Michigan (AP-1; UP-3)
- Al Viola, Northwestern (AP-2; UP-1)
- Dan Currie, Michigan State (AP-2; UP-2)
- Percy Oliver, Illinois (UP-2)

=== Centers ===
- John Matsko, Michigan State (AP-1; UP-2)
- Don Suchy, Iowa (AP-2; UP-1)

== Key ==
AP = Associated Press

UP = United Press, selected by the conference coaches

Bold = Consensus first-team selection by both the AP and UP

== See also ==
- 1956 College Football All-America Team
