= Stanley Jackson =

Stanley Jackson may refer to:

- Stanley Jackson (cricketer) (1870–1947), English cricketer and politician
- Stanley Jackson (gridiron football) (born 1975), quarterback
- Stan Jackson (quarterback), quarterback for Cal Poly Pomona, set college football total offense record in 1958
- Stanley Jackson (basketball) (born 1970), basketball player
- Stanley Jackson (filmmaker) (1914–1981), film director, commentary writer and narrator with National Film Board of Canada
- Stanley W. Jackson (1920–2000), American psychiatrist
