= 1957 Iowa State Teachers Panthers football team =

American college football season

1957 Iowa State Teachers Panthers football
- Conference: North Central Conference
- Record: 5–3 (4–2 NCC)
- Head coach: Clyde Starbeck (20th season)
- Home stadium: O. R. Latham Stadium

1957 North Central Conference football standings
	Conf.					Overall
Team	W		L		T	W		L		T
South Dakota State $	5	–	0	–	1	6	–	2	–	1
Morningside	4	–	1	–	1	6	–	2	–	1
Iowa State Teachers	4	–	2	–	0	5	–	3	–	0
South Dakota	3	–	2	–	1	4	–	4	–	1
North Dakota State	2	–	3	–	1	3	–	4	–	1
Augustana (SD)	0	–	5	–	0	0	–	7	–	0
North Dakota	0	–	5	–	0	0	–	8	–	0
$ – Conference champion

The 1957 Iowa State Teachers Panthers football team was an American football team that represented Iowa State Teachers College (later renamed University of Northern Iowa) as a member of the North Central Conference (NCC) during the 1957 college football season. In their 20th and final season under head coach Clyde Starbeck, the Panthers compiled a 5–3 record (4–2 in conference games) and finished in third place in the NCC. The team gained an average of 259.2 rushing yards per game, a figure that remains the school's single-season record.

Four I.S.T. players were named to the all-NCC team: halfbacks Tom Murphy and Lou Roberts; center Bob Knock; and guard Morris Smith. Max Huffman set a school record (since broken) with an average of 7.13 yards per carry (68 carries for 485 yards). Huffman also set a school record (since broken) with an average of 16.4 yards per punt return. Larry Roberts set a school record (since broken) with an average of 117.4 all-purpose yards per game

The team played its home games at O. R. Latham Stadium in Cedar Falls, Iowa.

== Schedule ==
Date	Opponent	Site	Result	Attendance	Source
September 14	at Drake	Drake Stadium<ncg>; Des Moines, IA	L 12–34	8,000	
September 21	at South Dakota State	State Field; Brookings, SD	L 20–23		
September 28	at North Dakota State	Dacotah Field; Fargo, ND	W 18–0		
October 4	at Northeast Missouri State*	Kirksville, MO	W 35–13		
October 12	Augustana (SD)	O. R. Latham Stadium; Cedar Falls, IA	W 54–12	5,800	
October 19	at Morningside	Sioux City, IA	L 7–21		
October 26	North Dakota	O. R. Latham Stadium; Cedar Falls, IA	W 27–20	2,900	
November 2	South Dakota	O. R. Latham Stadium; Cedar Falls, IA	W 27–7		
*Non-conference game
