= 1957 college football season =

American college football season

- First AP No. 1 of season: Oklahoma
- Regular season: September 20 – November 30, 1957
- Number of bowls: 6
- Bowl games: December 28, 1957 – January 1, 1958
- Champion(s): Auburn (AP); Ohio State (Coaches, FWAA)
- Heisman: John David Crow (halfback, Texas A&M)

The 1957 college football season was the 89th season of intercollegiate football in the United States. It concluded with two teams having claim to the major college national championship:

- Auburn compiled a 10–0 record and was ranked No. 1 in the final Associated Press (AP) writers poll and No. 2 in the final United Press International (UPI) coaches poll. Auburn has also been recognized as national champion by Billingsley Report, College Football Researchers Association, Helms Athletic Foundation, National Championship Foundation, Poling System, Sagarin Ratings, and Williamson System. Auburn was ineligible for a bowl game, however, having been placed on probation by the Southeastern Conference, after having paid two high school players $500 apiece.
- Ohio State compiled an 8–1 regular season record and was ranked No. 1 in the final UPI coaches poll. They would go on to defeat Oregon in the Rose Bowl, and after the bowls were given the Grantland Rice Award representative of the national championship by the Football Writers Association of America.

Other notable teams from the 1957 season include: Florida A&M (9–0, black college national champion); Pittsburg State (11–0, NAIA national champion); Arizona State (10–0, top-ranked offense outscored opponents, 397 to 66); and Middle Tennessee (10–0, Ohio Valley champion).

John David Crow of Texas A&M won the Heisman Trophy, and Bob Reifsnyder of Navy won the Maxwell Award. The statistical leaders among the major college teams included Washington State quarterback Bob Newman with 1,444 yards of total offense, Utah quarterback Lee Grosscup with 1,398 passing yards, and Arizona State halfback Leon Burton with 1,126 rushing yards and 96 points scored.

== Conference and program changes ==
=== Conference changes ===
- One conference began play in 1957:
  - Gulf Coast Athletic Conference – active through the 1963 season
- One conference played its final season in 1957:
  - Central Church College Conference – conference active since the 1951 season

=== Membership changes ===
School	1956 Conference	1957 Conference
Cincinnati Bearcats	Independent	Missouri Valley
Detroit Titans	Missouri Valley	Independent
East Tennessee State Buccaneers	VSAC	Ohio Valley
North Texas State College Eagles	Gulf Coast	Missouri Valley
Oklahoma A&M Cowboys	Missouri Valley	Independent

== Season chronology ==
=== September ===
In the preseason poll released on September 16, the defending champion Sooners of the University of Oklahoma—who had won 40 consecutive games dating back to 1953—were the first place choice for 127 of 174 writers casting votes, followed by Texas A&M, Michigan State, Minnesota, and Tennessee. As the regular season progressed, a new poll would be issued on the Monday following the weekend's games.

September 20 - Abner Haynes and Leon King suited up for North Texas State College against Texas Western at Kidd Field in El Paso, marking the first time a major college football team based in Texas fielded African-American players. King scored a 33-yard touchdown, while Haynes had a long touchdown run called back "despite never stepping out of bounds and the whistle not blowing until he crossed the goal line." Texas Western escaped with a 14–13 win.

September 20–21 - The U.S. Air Force Academy, founded two years earlier played its first major college schedule in 1957. The Falcons made their debut at UCLA on Friday night and lost 47–0. They would finish their first season 3–6–1, but were undefeated the following year. On Saturday, No. 1 Oklahoma won at No. 8 Pittsburgh 26–0, breaking the all-time record for consecutive wins. No. 2 Texas A&M beat Maryland 21–13 in a game at Dallas. No. 3 Michigan State, No. 4 Minnesota, and No. 5 Tennessee had not yet begun their seasons. No. 11 Georgia Tech beat Kentucky 13–0 and rose to third, while No. 12 Navy won 46–6 at Boston College and rose to fifth. The first AP poll was No. 1 Oklahoma, No. 2 Texas A&M, No. 3 Georgia Tech, No. 4 Michigan State, and No. 5 Navy.

September 28 - No. 1 Oklahoma was idle. No. 2 Texas A&M won at Texas Tech 21–0 and No. 3 Georgia Tech played to a scoreless tie with No. 15 SMU. No. 4 Michigan State beat Indiana 54–0. No. 5 Navy beat visiting William & Mary 33–6. No. 6 Minnesota, which beat Washington 46–7, and No. 7 Duke, which had beaten Virginia 40–0, rose into the top five. The next poll was No. 1 Oklahoma, No. 2 Michigan State, No. 3 Minnesota, No. 4 Duke, and No. 5 Texas A&M.

=== October ===
October 5 - No. 1 Oklahoma beat Iowa State 40–14. No. 2 Michigan State won at California 19–0. No. 3 Minnesota beat visiting Purdue 21–17, No. 4 Duke beat Maryland 14–0, and No. 5 Texas A&M won at Missouri 28–0. The next poll was No. 1 Oklahoma, No. 2 Michigan State, No. 3 Texas A&M, No. 4 Minnesota, and No. 5 Duke.

October 12 - A crowd of 75,504 watched in Dallas as No. 1 Oklahoma had a difficult time with unranked Texas; the Longhorns picked off four passes and the score was 7–7 at the half before the Sooners preserved their winning streak 21–7 in a game that wasn't pretty. At the same time, No. 2 Michigan State won 35–6 at No. 6 Michigan, leading the AP voters to re-evaluate. No. 3 Texas A&M won 28–6 over Houston. No. 4 Minnesota won 41–6 at Northwestern. No. 5 Duke narrowly beat No. 15 Rice in Houston, 7–6. The Spartans took over the top spot in the next poll: No. 1 Michigan State, No. 2 Oklahoma, No. 3 Texas A&M, No. 4 Minnesota, and No. 5 Duke.

October 19 - No. 1 Michigan State lost 20–13 to Purdue and fell out of the top five, while No. 2 Oklahoma beat Kansas 47–0 and reclaimed the top spot. No. 3 Texas A&M won 7–0 at TCU and No. 4 Minnesota lost at Illinois 34–14. No. 5 Duke beat Wake Forest 34–7, and No. 6 Iowa beat No. 13 Wisconsin 21–7, while No. 9 Auburn beat Georgia Tech 3–0 in Atlanta and rose to fifth place in the polls. The next poll: No. 1 Oklahoma, No. 2 Texas A&M, No. 3 Iowa, No. 4 Duke, and No. 5 Auburn.

October 26 - No. 1 Oklahoma edged Colorado 14–13, and lost the top spot again, despite being 5–0. No. 2 Texas A&M beat Baylor 14–0 and replaced the Sooners in the next poll. No. 3 Iowa won 6–0 at Northwestern and rose to third. No. 4 Duke went to neighboring Raleigh to play No. 11 North Carolina State and ended with a 14–14 tie. No. 5 Auburn won at Houston 48–7. No. 7 Notre Dame beat Pittsburgh 13–7 and rose to fifth. The next poll: No. 1 Texas A&M, No. 2 Oklahoma, No. 3 Iowa, No. 4 Auburn, and No. 5 Notre Dame.

=== November ===
November 2 - No. 1 Texas A&M got past No. 11 Arkansas 7–6 in Fayetteville, and No. 2 Oklahoma won at Kansas State 13–0. No. 3 Iowa played No. 12 Michigan to a 21–21 tie, and No. 4 Auburn beat No. 19 Florida 13–0. No. 5 Notre Dame lost 20–6 to visiting No. 16 Navy, and No. 6 Michigan State won 21–7 at Wisconsin to rise into the top five. The next poll: No. 1 Texas A&M, No. 2 Oklahoma, No. 3 Auburn, No. 4 Michigan State, and No. 5 Iowa.

November 9 - No. 1 Texas A&M beat SMU 19–6 and No. 2 Oklahoma won at Missouri 39–14. No. 3 Auburn beat No. 17 Mississippi State 15–7 in Birmingham, No. 4 Michigan State beat No. 15 Notre Dame 34–6, and No. 5 Iowa beat Minnesota 44–20. The poll remained unchanged.

November 16 - No. 1 Texas A&M lost 7–6 to No. 20 Rice in Houston. No. 2 Oklahoma had won a record 47 consecutive games when they hosted Notre Dame. The Irish, 4–2 and on a losing streak, were an 18–point underdog coming into Norman. The Sooners, who had scored in 123 consecutive games dating back to 1945, were unable to reach the end zone, but had held off the Irish on two goal line stands. In the final minutes, Notre Dame was on the 3–yard line on fourth down, when Dick Lynch "crossed up the Sooners" and ran around right end for a touchdown. Oklahoma's desperate passing drive at game's end was stopped by a Notre Dame interception, and the crowd of 62,000 was stunned into silence... and then stood up and applauded for both the Sooners and the Irish. Oklahoma's previous defeat, more than four years earlier, had been at the hands of Notre Dame as well. Final score: Notre Dame 7, Oklahoma 0. No. 3 Auburn beat Georgia 6–0 at Columbus, Georgia while No. 4 Michigan State beat Minnesota 42–13. No. 5 Iowa lost 17–13 at No. 6 Ohio State; the 7–1 Buckeyes rose to third, while the 6–1–1 Hawkeyes fell to eighth. No. 8 Mississippi, which beat No. 7 Tennessee 14–7 in Memphis, rose to fifth. The next poll: No. 1 Michigan State, No. 2 Auburn, No. 3 Ohio State, No. 4 Texas A&M, and No. 5 Mississippi.

November 23 - No. 1 Michigan State closed its season with a 27–0 win over Kansas State, but fell to third. No. 2 Auburn won at Florida State 29–7. As the only unbeaten (9–0) school among the majors, Auburn was voted No. 1 in the AP poll. No. 3 Ohio State wrapped up its season with a win 31–14 at No. 19 Michigan and was first in the UPI poll. No. 4 Texas A&M and No. 5 Mississippi were idle, while No. 6 Oklahoma won 53–6 at Nebraska and returned to the top five. The poll: No. 1 Auburn, No. 2 Ohio State, No. 3 Michigan State, No. 4 Texas A&M, and No. 5 Oklahoma.

November 28–30 - Thanksgiving Day saw Bear Bryant's No. 4 Texas A&M team lose 9–7 to Texas. On Saturday, No. 1 Auburn shut out rival Alabama 40–0 at their annual meeting in Birmingham to close its season 10–0, while the Crimson Tide finished at 2–7–1. Bryant, who had transformed the Aggies from a 1–9 team in 1953 to a contender (Texas A&M was undefeated in 1956, and their two losses in 1957 were by a total of three points), would accept the job as head coach at his alma mater Alabama at season's end. No. 2 Ohio State and No. 3 Michigan State were both 8–1 in the regular season, but Ohio State was 7–0 in Big Ten play, compared to the 5–1 Spartans, and got the Rose Bowl bid against unranked Oregon. No. 5 Oklahoma beat Oklahoma State 53–6 and prepared for the Orange Bowl. No. 8 Navy, which won the Army–Navy Game 14–0 in Philadelphia, finished with an 8–1–1 record, a bid to meet SWC champion Rice in the Cotton Bowl, and a fifth-place finish in the final poll.

The services were split as to the national champion. The AP Trophy went to Auburn, the choice of a majority of writers for No. 1, and the only major college program to finish unbeaten (Arizona State, then a lesser power, also finished 10–0). Auburn, however, was on probation and was ineligible for a bowl (conference runner-up Mississippi received the SEC's automatic slot in the Sugar Bowl), and the UPI coaches poll awarded No. 1 to the Ohio State Buckeyes (8–1). Both Auburn and Ohio State are recognized in the NCAA Football Guidebook as unofficial national champions for 1957. The final AP poll was: No. 1 Auburn, No. 2 Ohio State, No. 3 Michigan State, No. 4 Oklahoma, and No. 5 Navy, while the UPI poll was No. 1 Ohio State, No. 2 Auburn, No. 3 Michigan State, No. 4 Oklahoma, and No. 5 Iowa.

== Conference standings ==
=== Major conference standings ===
1957 Atlantic Coast Conference football standings
	Conf.					Overall
Team	W		L		T	W		L		T
No. 15 NC State $	5	–	0	–	1	7	–	1	–	2
No. 16 Duke	5	–	1	–	1	6	–	3	–	2
Clemson	4	–	3	–	0	7	–	3	–	0
North Carolina	4	–	3	–	0	7	–	3	–	0
Maryland	4	–	3	–	0	5	–	5	–	0
Virginia	2	–	4	–	0	3	–	6	–	1
South Carolina	2	–	5	–	0	5	–	5	–	0
Wake Forest	0	–	7	–	0	0	–	10	–	0
$ – Conference champion; Rankings from AP poll

1957 Big Seven Conference football standings
	Conf.					Overall
Team	W		L		T	W		L		T
No. 4 Oklahoma $	6	–	0	–	0	10	–	1	–	0
Kansas	4	–	2	–	0	5	–	4	–	1
Missouri	3	–	3	–	0	5	–	4	–	1
Colorado	3	–	3	–	0	6	–	3	–	1
Iowa State	2	–	4	–	0	4	–	5	–	1
Kansas State	2	–	4	–	0	3	–	6	–	1
Nebraska	1	–	5	–	0	1	–	9	–	0
$ – Conference champion; Rankings from AP Poll

1957 Big Ten Conference football standings
	Conf.					Overall
Team	W		L		T	W		L		T
No. 2 Ohio State $	7	–	0	–	0	9	–	1	–	0
No. 3 Michigan State	5	–	1	–	0	8	–	1	–	0
No. 6 Iowa	4	–	1	–	1	7	–	1	–	1
No. 19 Wisconsin	4	–	3	–	0	6	–	3	–	0
Purdue	4	–	3	–	0	5	–	4	–	0
Michigan	3	–	3	–	1	5	–	3	–	1
Illinois	3	–	4	–	0	4	–	5	–	0
Minnesota	3	–	5	–	0	4	–	5	–	0
Indiana	0	–	6	–	0	1	–	8	–	0
Northwestern	0	–	7	–	0	0	–	9	–	0
$ – Conference champion; Rankings from AP Poll

1957 Border Conference football standings
	Conf.					Overall
Team	W		L		T	W		L		T
No. 12 Arizona State $	4	–	0	–	0	10	–	0	–	0
West Texas State	3	–	1	–	0	7	–	3	–	0
Texas Western	3	–	2	–	0	6	–	3	–	0
Hardin–Simmons	3	–	2	–	0	5	–	5	–	0
New Mexico A&M	0	–	4	–	0	3	–	7	–	0
Arizona	0	–	4	–	0	1	–	8	–	1
$ – Conference champion; Rankings from AP poll

1957 Ivy League football standings
	Conf.					Overall
Team	W		L		T	W		L		T
Princeton $	6	–	1	–	0	7	–	2	–	0
Dartmouth	5	–	1	–	1	7	–	1	–	1
Yale	4	–	2	–	1	6	–	2	–	1
Brown	3	–	4	–	0	5	–	4	–	0
Cornell	3	–	4	–	0	3	–	6	–	0
Penn	3	–	4	–	0	3	–	6	–	0
Harvard	2	–	5	–	0	3	–	5	–	0
Columbia	1	–	6	–	0	1	–	8	–	0
$ – Conference champion

1957 Middle Three Conference football standings
	Conf.					Overall
Team	W		L		T	W		L		T
Lehigh $	2	–	0	–	0	8	–	1	–	0
Rutgers	1	–	1	–	0	5	–	4	–	0
Lafayette	0	–	2	–	0	4	–	4	–	0
$ – Conference champion

1957 Missouri Valley Conference football standings
	Conf.					Overall
Team	W		L		T	W		L		T
Houston $	3	–	0	–	0	5	–	4	–	1
North Texas State	1	–	0	–	0	5	–	5	–	0
Tulsa	2	–	2	–	0	4	–	6	–	0
Cincinnati	1	–	2	–	0	5	–	4	–	1
Wichita	0	–	3	–	0	1	–	9	–	0
$ – Conference champion

1957 Pacific Coast Conference football standings
	Conf.					Overall
Team	W		L		T	W		L		T
Oregon State +	6	–	2	–	0	8	–	2	–	0
No. 17 Oregon ^ +	6	–	2	–	0	7	–	4	–	0
No. 19 UCLA	5	–	2	–	0	8	–	2	–	0
Washington State	5	–	3	–	0	6	–	4	–	0
Stanford	4	–	3	–	0	6	–	4	–	0
Washington	3	–	4	–	0	3	–	6	–	1
California	1	–	6	–	0	1	–	9	–	0
USC	1	–	6	–	0	1	–	9	–	0
Idaho	0	–	3	–	0	4	–	4	–	1
+ – Conference co-champions; ^ – Selected as Rose Bowl representative Oregon State won the rivalry game over Oregon, but PCC no-repeat rule was in effect; Rankings from Coaches Poll

1957 Skyline Conference football standings
	Conf.					Overall
Team	W		L		T	W		L		T
Utah $	5	–	1	–	0	6	–	4	–	0
BYU	5	–	1	–	1	5	–	3	–	2
Denver	5	–	2	–	0	6	–	4	–	0
Wyoming	3	–	2	–	2	4	–	3	–	3
New Mexico	2	–	4	–	0	4	–	6	–	0
Colorado State	2	–	5	–	0	3	–	7	–	0
Montana	2	–	5	–	0	2	–	7	–	0
Utah State	1	–	5	–	1	2	–	7	–	1
$ – Conference champion

1957 Southeastern Conference football standings
	Conf.					Overall
Team	W		L		T	W		L		T
No. 1 Auburn $	7	–	0	–	0	10	–	0	–	0
No. 7 Ole Miss	5	–	0	–	1	9	–	1	–	1
No. 14 Mississippi State	4	–	2	–	1	6	–	2	–	1
No. 17 Florida	4	–	2	–	1	6	–	2	–	1
No. 13 Tennessee	4	–	3	–	0	8	–	3	–	0
Vanderbilt	3	–	3	–	1	5	–	3	–	2
LSU	4	–	4	–	0	5	–	5	–	0
Georgia Tech	3	–	4	–	1	4	–	4	–	2
Georgia	3	–	4	–	0	3	–	7	–	0
Tulane	1	–	5	–	0	2	–	8	–	0
Alabama	1	–	6	–	1	2	–	7	–	1
Kentucky	1	–	7	–	0	3	–	7	–	0
$ – Conference champion; Rankings from AP Poll

1957 Southern Conference football standings
	Conf.					Overall
Team	W		L		T	W		L		T
No. 20 VMI $	6	–	0	–	0	9	–	0	–	1
West Virginia	3	–	0	–	0	7	–	2	–	1
The Citadel	4	–	2	–	0	5	–	4	–	1
Furman	2	–	1	–	0	3	–	7	–	0
Richmond	2	–	4	–	0	4	–	6	–	0
William & Mary	2	–	4	–	0	4	–	6	–	0
Davidson	1	–	3	–	0	5	–	3	–	0
VPI	1	–	3	–	0	4	–	5	–	0
George Washington	1	–	5	–	0	2	–	7	–	0
Washington and Lee	0	–	0	–	0	0	–	8	–	0
$ – Conference champion; Rankings from AP Poll

1957 Southwest Conference football standings
	Conf.					Overall
Team	W		L		T	W		L		T
No. 8 Rice $	5	–	1	–	0	7	–	4	–	0
No. 11 Texas	4	–	1	–	1	6	–	4	–	1
No. 9 Texas A&M	4	–	2	–	0	8	–	3	–	0
SMU	3	–	3	–	0	4	–	5	–	1
Arkansas	2	–	4	–	0	6	–	4	–	0
TCU	2	–	4	–	0	5	–	4	–	1
Baylor	0	–	5	–	1	3	–	6	–	1
$ – Conference champion; Rankings from AP Poll

=== Major independents ===
1957 Eastern major college football independents records
	Conf.			Overall
Team	W	L	T	W		L		T
No. 18 Army		–		7	–	2	–	0
Penn State		–		6	–	3	–	0
Boston University		–		5	–	3	–	0
Holy Cross		–		5	–	3	–	1
Syracuse		–		5	–	3	–	1
Pittsburgh		–		4	–	6	–	0
Colgate		–		3	–	6	–	0
Villanova		–		3	–	6	–	0
Rankings from AP poll

1957 Midwestern major college football independents records
	Conf.			Overall
Team	W	L	T	W		L		T
No. 10 Notre Dame		–		7	–	3	–	0
Drake		–		7	–	2	–	0
Detroit		–		6	–	3	–	0
Dayton		–		6	–	3	–	1
Xavier		–		5	–	5	–	0
Marquette		–		0	–	10	–	0
Rankings from AP poll

1957 Southern major college football independents records
	Conf.			Overall
Team	W	L	T	W		L		T
No. 5 Navy		–		9	–	1	–	1
Oklahoma State		–		6	–	3	–	1
Miami (FL)		–		5	–	4	–	1
Florida State		–		4	–	6	–	0
Texas Tech		–		2	–	8	–	0
Rankings from AP poll

1957 Western major college football independents records
	Conf.			Overall
Team	W	L	T	W		L		T
Pacific (CA)		–		5	–	3	–	2
Air Force		–		3	–	6	–	1
San Jose State		–		3	–	7	–	0

=== Minor conference standings ===
1957 California Collegiate Athletic Association football standings
	Conf.					Overall
Team	W		L		T	W		L		T
Cal Poly $	3	–	0	–	0	8	–	1	–	0
UC Santa Barbara	2	–	1	–	0	6	–	2	–	0
Fresno State	1	–	1	–	0	5	–	5	–	0
Los Angeles State	1	–	1	–	0	5	–	4	–	0
San Diego State	0	–	1	–	0	2	–	7	–	0
Long Beach State	0	–	3	–	0	3	–	5	–	0
$ – Conference champion; The conference championship was unofficial because the six CCAA members did not play a full conference schedule.

1957 Central Intercollegiate Athletic Association football standings
	Conf.					Overall
Team	W		L		T	W		L		T
Maryland State $	6	–	0	–	1	6	–	1	–	1
North Carolina A&T	4	–	2	–	0	4	–	3	–	1
North Carolina College	4	–	3	–	0	5	–	4	–	0
Morgan State	4	–	2	–	1	5	–	3	–	1
Bluefield State	4	–	2	–	0	6	–	2	–	0
Shaw	5	–	3	–	0	5	–	3	–	0
Virginia Union	5	–	3	–	0	6	–	3	–	0
Virginia State	4	–	4	–	0	4	–	4	–	0
Elizabeth City State	4	–	1	–	1	6	–	1	–	1
Winston-Salem State	5	–	3	–	0	5	–	3	–	0
Delaware State	4	–	2	–	0	6	–	2	–	0
Hampton	4	–	5	–	0	4	–	5	–	0
St. Augustine's	2	–	4	–	1	3	–	4	–	1
Lincoln (PA)	2	–	4	–	0	2	–	5	–	0
Howard	2	–	4	–	0	3	–	6	–	0
Fayetteville State	2	–	7	–	0	2	–	7	–	0
Johnson C. Smith	1	–	6	–	0	1	–	6	–	1
Saint Paul's (VA)	0	–	7	–	0	0	–	8	–	0
$ – Conference champion; Conference standings were based on the Dickinson System.

1957 Central Intercollegiate Conference football standings
	Conf.					Overall
Team	W		L		T	W		L		T
Pittsburg State $^	5	–	0	–	0	11	–	0	–	0
St. Benedict's	4	–	1	–	0	7	–	1	–	0
Fort Hays State	2	–	2	–	0	4	–	4	–	0
Washburn	2	–	3	–	0	5	–	4	–	0
Emporia State	1	–	3	–	0	2	–	7	–	0
Southwestern (KS)	0	–	5	–	0	1	–	8	–	0
$ – Conference champion; ^ – NAIA playoff participant

1957 College Conference of Illinois football standings
	Conf.					Overall
Team	W		L		T	W		L		T
Wheaton (IL) +	6	–	1	–	0	8	–	1	–	0
Lake Forest +	6	–	1	–	0	6	–	2	–	0
North Central (IL)	5	–	2	–	0	7	–	2	–	0
Millikin	4	–	2	–	1	4	–	3	–	1
Augustana (IL)	3	–	4	–	0	4	–	4	–	0
Carroll (WI)	2	–	5	–	0	2	–	6	–	0
Illinois Wesleyan	1	–	5	–	1	1	–	7	–	1
Elmhurst	0	–	7	–	0	1	–	7	–	0
+ – Conference co-champions

1957 Eastern Intercollegiate Athletic Conference football standings
	Conf.					Overall
Team	W		L		T	W		L		T
Norfolk State $	4	–	0	–	0	5	–	1	–	0
Livingstone	4	–	1	–	0	6	–	2	–	1
Friendship	2	–	2	–	0	?	–	?	–	?
South Carolina Trade	2	–	3	–	0	3	–	5	–	0
Morristown	1	–	4	–	0	?	–	?	–	?
Voorhees	1	–	4	–	0	?	–	?	–	?
$ – Conference champion

1957 Far Western Conference football standings
	Conf.					Overall
Team	W		L		T	W		L		T
San Francisco State $	5	–	0	–	0	7	–	3	–	0
Chico State	4	–	1	–	0	7	–	2	–	0
Humboldt State	3	–	2	–	0	4	–	6	–	0
Sacramento State	2	–	3	–	0	5	–	4	–	0
Nevada	1	–	4	–	0	1	–	8	–	0
Cal Aggies	0	–	5	–	0	1	–	7	–	1
$ – Conference champion

1957 Gulf States Conference football standings
	Conf.					Overall
Team	W		L		T	W		L		T
McNeese State +	4	–	1	–	0	8	–	2	–	0
Northwestern State +	4	–	1	–	0	7	–	2	–	0
Louisiana Tech +	4	–	1	–	0	6	–	4	–	0
Southwestern Louisiana	1	–	3	–	1	4	–	5	–	1
Southeastern Louisiana	1	–	3	–	1	2	–	6	–	1
Northeast Louisiana State	0	–	5	–	0	2	–	6	–	0
+ – Conference co-champions

1957 Hoosier Conference football standings
	Conf.					Overall
Team	W		L		T	W		L		T
Hanover +	4	–	1	–	0	8	–	1	–	0
Anderson (IN) +	4	–	1	–	0	7	–	1	–	0
Taylor	3	–	1	–	1	7	–	1	–	1
Indiana Central	2	–	3	–	0	3	–	6	–	1
Franklin (IN)	1	–	4	–	0	4	–	5	–	0
Manchester (IN)	0	–	4	–	1	2	–	6	–	1
+ – Conference co-champions

1957 Indiana Collegiate Conference football standings
	Conf.					Overall
Team	W		L		T	W		L		T
Saint Joseph's (IN) $	5	–	0	–	0	8	–	1	–	0
Butler	5	–	1	–	0	7	–	2	–	0
DePauw	3	–	2	–	0	6	–	2	–	0
Ball State	2	–	3	–	1	2	–	5	–	1
Valparaiso	1	–	2	–	1	4	–	2	–	2
Evansville	1	–	4	–	0	1	–	6	–	0
Indiana State	0	–	5	–	0	1	–	6	–	0
$ – Conference champion

1957 Interstate Intercollegiate Athletic Conference football standings
	Conf.					Overall
Team	W		L		T	W		L		T
Eastern Michigan $	6	–	0	–	0	6	–	3	–	0
Western Illinois	4	–	2	–	0	5	–	4	–	0
Central Michigan	4	–	2	–	0	4	–	6	–	0
Illinois State Normal	3	–	3	–	0	5	–	3	–	0
Southern Illinois	3	–	3	–	0	5	–	4	–	0
Northern Illinois	1	–	5	–	0	2	–	7	–	0
Eastern Illinois	0	–	6	–	0	0	–	8	–	0
$ – Conference champion

1957 Iowa Conference football standings
	Conf.					Overall
Team	W		L		T	W		L		T
Luther $	7	–	1	–	0	8	–	1	–	0
Upper Iowa	6	–	2	–	0	6	–	3	–	0
Parsons	5	–	2	–	1	7	–	2	–	1
Simpson (IA)	4	–	4	–	0	4	–	4	–	0
Wartburg	4	–	4	–	0	5	–	4	–	0
Buena Vista	3	–	4	–	0	3	–	5	–	0
Central (IA)	2	–	4	–	1	3	–	4	–	1
Dubuque	1	–	5	–	2	1	–	5	–	2
Iowa Wesleyan	1	–	7	–	0	2	–	7	–	0
$ – Conference champion

1957 Lone Star Conference football standings
	Conf.					Overall
Team	W		L		T	W		L		T
Lamar Tech $	5	–	0	–	2	8	–	0	–	2
East Texas State	6	–	1	–	0	9	–	1	–	0
Stephen F. Austin	5	–	2	–	0	6	–	4	–	0
Sam Houston State	3	–	3	–	1	3	–	5	–	1
Southwest Texas State	3	–	4	–	0	4	–	6	–	0
Texas A&I	2	–	4	–	1	5	–	5	–	1
Howard Payne	2	–	5	–	0	3	–	6	–	0
Sul Ross	0	–	7	–	0	3	–	7	–	0
$ – Conference champion

1957 Mason–Dixon Conference football standings
	Conf.					Overall
Team	W		L		T	W		L		T
Hampden–Sydney $	4	–	0	–	0	8	–	1	–	0
Randolph–Macon	1	–	1	–	2	3	–	3	–	2
Johns Hopkins	1	–	1	–	1	3	–	2	–	2
Bridgewater	1	–	2	–	0	3	–	4	–	0
Western Maryland	0	–	2	–	1	1	–	6	–	1
Gallaudet	0	–	1	–	0	0	–	6	–	0
$ – Conference champion; Conference standings were based on the Dickinson Scoring System.

1957 Michigan Intercollegiate Athletic Association football standings
	Conf.					Overall
Team	W		L		T	W		L		T
Hillsdale $^	6	–	0	–	0	9	–	1	–	0
Hope	4	–	2	–	0	7	–	2	–	0
Albion	4	–	2	–	0	5	–	3	–	0
Alma	3	–	2	–	1	5	–	2	–	2
Kalamazoo	2	–	3	–	1	2	–	5	–	1
Adrian	1	–	5	–	0	3	–	5	–	0
Olivet	0	–	6	–	0	0	–	9	–	0
$ – Conference champion; ^ – NAIA playoff participant

1957 Mid-American Conference football standings
	Conf.					Overall
Team	W		L		T	W		L		T
Miami (OH) $	5	–	0	–	0	6	–	3	–	0
Bowling Green	3	–	1	–	2	6	–	1	–	2
Marshall	4	–	2	–	0	6	–	3	–	0
Toledo	3	–	2	–	0	5	–	4	–	0
Western Michigan	1	–	4	–	1	4	–	4	–	1
Ohio	1	–	4	–	1	2	–	6	–	1
Kent State	1	–	5	–	0	3	–	6	–	0
$ – Conference champion

1957 Mid-Ohio League football standings
	Conf.					Overall
Team	W		L		T	W		L		T
Bluffton $	5	–	0	–	0	7	–	2	–	0
Ashland	3	–	1	–	1	4	–	3	–	1
Defiance	3	–	2	–	0	3	–	5	–	0
Findlay	2	–	2	–	1	2	–	6	–	1
Ohio Northern	1	–	4	–	0	1	–	7	–	0
Wilmington (OH)	0	–	5	–	0	0	–	6	–	1
$ – Conference champion

1957 Midwest Athletic Association football standings
	Conf.					Overall
Team	W		L		T	W		L		T
No. 2 Tennessee A&I +	3	–	0	–	0	5	–	0	–	1
No. 22 Jackson State +	2	–	0	–	0	6	–	2	–	0
No. 5 Lincoln (MO)	2	–	1	–	0	8	–	1	–	0
Kentucky State	1	–	3	–	0	3	–	6	–	0
Grambling	0	–	1	–	0	4	–	4	–	0
Central State (OH)	0	–	3	–	0	4	–	4	–	1
+ – Conference co-champions; Rankings from Pittsburgh Courier

1957 Midwest Conference football standings
	Conf.					Overall
Team	W		L		T	W		L		T
Ripon $	8	–	0	–	0	8	–	0	–	0
Carleton	6	–	1	–	1	6	–	1	–	1
Coe	6	–	2	–	0	6	–	2	–	0
Cornell (IA)	3	–	3	–	2	3	–	3	–	2
Grinnell	3	–	3	–	2	3	–	3	–	2
St. Olaf	4	–	4	–	0	4	–	4	–	0
Knox	1	–	6	–	1	1	–	6	–	1
Lawrence	1	–	7	–	0	1	–	7	–	0
Monmouth (IL)	1	–	7	–	0	1	–	7	–	0
$ – Conference champion

1957 Minnesota Intercollegiate Athletic Conference football standings
	Conf.					Overall
Team	W		L		T	W		L		T
Concordia (MN) $	6	–	1	–	0	7	–	2	–	0
Macalester	5	–	1	–	1	6	–	1	–	1
Gustavus Adolphus	5	–	1	–	1	5	–	3	–	1
Saint John's (MN)	4	–	3	–	0	5	–	3	–	0
Augsburg	3	–	4	–	0	4	–	4	–	0
Minnesota–Duluth	2	–	5	–	0	2	–	5	–	1
St. Thomas (MN)	1	–	5	–	1	2	–	5	–	1
Hamline	0	–	6	–	0	0	–	7	–	1
$ – Conference champion

1957 Minnesota State College Conference football standings
	Conf.					Overall
Team	W		L		T	W		L		T
Winona State +	3	–	1	–	0	5	–	3	–	0
Bemidji State +	3	–	1	–	0	4	–	4	–	0
Moorhead State	2	–	2	–	0	3	–	4	–	1
Mankato State	1	–	2	–	1	2	–	6	–	1
St. Cloud State	0	–	3	–	1	0	–	7	–	1
+ – Conference co-champions

1957 Missouri Intercollegiate Athletic Association football standings
	Conf.					Overall
Team	W		L		T	W		L		T
SE Missouri State $	4	–	0	–	1	6	–	2	–	1
Missouri–Rolla	3	–	2	–	0	5	–	5	–	0
NE Missouri State	3	–	2	–	0	4	–	5	–	0
SW Missouri State	2	–	3	–	0	4	–	4	–	1
Central Missouri State	1	–	3	–	1	1	–	7	–	1
NW Missouri State	1	–	4	–	0	1	–	6	–	1
$ – Conference champion

1957 North Central Conference football standings
	Conf.					Overall
Team	W		L		T	W		L		T
South Dakota State $	5	–	0	–	1	6	–	2	–	1
Morningside	4	–	1	–	1	6	–	2	–	1
Iowa State Teachers	4	–	2	–	0	5	–	3	–	0
South Dakota	3	–	2	–	1	4	–	4	–	1
North Dakota State	2	–	3	–	1	3	–	4	–	1
Augustana (SD)	0	–	5	–	0	0	–	7	–	0
North Dakota	0	–	5	–	0	0	–	8	–	0
$ – Conference champion

1957 Ohio Athletic Conference football standings
	Conf.					Overall
Team	W		L		T	W		L		T
Denison +	6	–	1	–	0	8	–	1	–	0
Wittenberg +	6	–	1	–	0	7	–	2	–	0
Akron	5	–	1	–	1	7	–	1	–	1
Capital	5	–	1	–	1	6	–	1	–	1
Heidelberg	4	–	2	–	0	7	–	2	–	0
Otterbein	4	–	2	–	0	5	–	3	–	0
Muskingum	4	–	3	–	0	5	–	4	–	0
Ohio Wesleyan	3	–	4	–	0	4	–	5	–	0
Hiram	2	–	4	–	0	3	–	5	–	0
Kenyon	1	–	3	–	0	2	–	3	–	1
Wooster	2	–	6	–	0	3	–	6	–	0
Mount Union	2	–	6	–	0	2	–	6	–	0
Marietta	1	–	5	–	0	2	–	6	–	0
Oberlin	0	–	6	–	0	1	–	6	–	1
+ – Conference co-champions

1957 Ohio Valley Conference football standings
	Conf.					Overall
Team	W		L		T	W		L		T
Middle Tennessee $	5	–	0	–	0	10	–	0	–	0
Tennessee Tech	4	–	1	–	0	6	–	4	–	0
Eastern Kentucky	3	–	2	–	0	4	–	5	–	0
Western Kentucky	1	–	3	–	1	5	–	3	–	1
Murray State	1	–	3	–	1	3	–	5	–	1
Morehead State	0	–	5	–	0	2	–	7	–	0
$ – Conference champion

1957 Pennsylvania State Teachers College Conference football standings
	Conf.					Overall
Team	W		L		T	W		L		T
Lock Haven +	5	–	0	–	0	8	–	0	–	0
Shippensburg +	5	–	0	–	0	6	–	0	–	1
West Chester	4	–	0	–	0	9	–	0	–	0
Edinboro	2	–	1	–	0	3	–	4	–	0
Slippery Rock	2	–	1	–	0	5	–	2	–	0
Kutztown	2	–	1	–	1	3	–	4	–	1
Bloomsburg	2	–	3	–	0	5	–	2	–	1
East Stroudsburg	2	–	3	–	1	3	–	4	–	1
Indiana (PA)	2	–	2	–	0	3	–	6	–	0
Mansfield	1	–	2	–	0	3	–	3	–	0
California (PA)	1	–	4	–	0	2	–	5	–	0
Millersville	1	–	5	–	0	2	–	6	–	0
Clarion	1	–	4	–	0	2	–	6	–	0
Cheyney	0	–	4	–	0	0	–	6	–	0
+ – Conference co-champions; Conference standings were based on the Saylor system of ratings.

1957 Presidents' Athletic Conference football standings
	Conf.					Overall
Team	W		L		T	W		L		T
John Carroll $	3	–	0	–	0	6	–	1	–	0
Wayne State (MI)	2	–	1	–	0	4	–	4	–	0
Western Reserve	1	–	2	–	0	2	–	4	–	0
Case Tech	0	–	3	–	0	0	–	5	–	1
$ – Conference champion

1957 Rocky Mountain Conference football standings
	Conf.					Overall
Team	W		L		T	W		L		T
Idaho State $	5	–	0	–	0	9	–	0	–	0
Western State (CO)	3	–	1	–	1	5	–	4	–	1
Colorado State–Greeley	3	–	2	–	0	6	–	3	–	0
Colorado College	2	–	3	–	0	3	–	5	–	0
Colorado Mines	0	–	3	–	2	0	–	6	–	3
Adams State	0	–	4	–	1	0	–	9	–	1
$ – Conference champion

1957 Southern California Intercollegiate Athletic Conference football standings
	Conf.					Overall
Team	W		L		T	W		L		T
Whittier $	3	–	0	–	1	6	–	2	–	1
Pomona-Claremont	2	–	1	–	0	3	–	4	–	0
Redlands	2	–	1	–	1	4	–	4	–	1
Caltech	1	–	2	–	0	4	–	3	–	0
Occidental	0	–	4	–	0	1	–	7	–	1
$ – Conference champion

1957 Southern Intercollegiate Athletic Conference football standings
	Conf.					Overall
Team	W		L		T	W		L		T
Florida A&M $	5	–	0	–	0	9	–	0	–	0
Morris Brown	4	–	1	–	1	5	–	2	–	1
Fort Valley State	5	–	3	–	0	6	–	3	–	0
South Carolina State	4	–	2	–	1	5	–	2	–	1
Clark (GA)	4	–	2	–	0	5	–	2	–	0
Allen	5	–	2	–	0	6	–	2	–	0
Tuskegee	4	–	2	–	0	4	–	4	–	0
Alabama State	4	–	4	–	0	4	–	5	–	0
Fisk	1	–	3	–	1	1	–	5	–	1
Benedict	2	–	4	–	0	4	–	4	–	0
Morehouse	1	–	4	–	1	2	–	5	–	1
Alabama A&M	2	–	7	–	0	2	–	7	–	0
Bethune–Cookman	1	–	5	–	0	2	–	6	–	0
Knoxville	1	–	5	–	0	1	–	7	–	0
Lane	2	–	1	–	0	4	–	4	–	0
Xavier (LA)	2	–	2	–	0	2	–	5	–	0
$ – Conference champion; Standings were based on Dickinson System ratings. Lane and Xavier did not play the minimum of five conference games to qualify for the standings.

1957 Southwestern Athletic Conference football standings
	Conf.					Overall
Team	W		L		T	W		L		T
Wiley $	6	–	0	–	0	10	–	0	–	1
Texas Southern	4	–	2	–	0	7	–	3	–	1
Prairie View A&M	4	–	2	–	0	6	–	3	–	1
Southern	4	–	2	–	0	6	–	4	–	0
Arkansas AM&N	2	–	4	–	0	3	–	6	–	0
Texas College	1	–	5	–	0	4	–	5	–	0
Langston	0	–	6	–	0	0	–	9	–	0
$ – Conference champion

1957 Virginia Little Eight Conference football standings
	Conf.					Overall
Team	W		L		T	W		L		T
Hampden–Sydney $	3	–	0	–	0	8	–	1	–	0
Emory and Henry	1	–	1	–	0	5	–	4	–	0
Randolph–Macon	1	–	2	–	0	3	–	3	–	2
Bridgewater	0	–	2	–	0	3	–	4	–	0
$ – Conference champion

1957 Wisconsin State College Conference football standings
	Conf.					Overall
Team	W		L		T	W		L		T
Platteville State $	5	–	0	–	0	5	–	1	–	0
River Falls State	4	–	1	–	0	6	–	2	–	0
Whitewater State	3	–	1	–	1	5	–	2	–	1
Oshkosh State	3	–	3	–	0	4	–	3	–	0
Eau Claire State	3	–	4	–	0	3	–	5	–	0
Superior State	2	–	3	–	0	4	–	4	–	1
La Crosse State	2	–	3	–	0	4	–	5	–	0
Stevens Point State	2	–	4	–	0	3	–	4	–	0
Stout State	1	–	3	–	1	3	–	4	–	1
Milwaukee	1	–	4	–	0	2	–	6	–	0
$ – Conference champion

1957 Yankee Conference football standings
	Conf.					Overall
Team	W		L		T	W		L		T
Rhode Island +	3	–	0	–	1	5	–	2	–	1
Connecticut +	3	–	0	–	1	5	–	4	–	1
Maine	2	–	2	–	0	4	–	4	–	0
UMass	1	–	2	–	1	1	–	5	–	1
Vermont	0	–	2	–	0	2	–	5	–	0
New Hampshire	0	–	3	–	1	0	–	7	–	1
+ – Conference co-champions

=== Non-major independents ===
1957 Eastern non-major college football independents records
	Conf.			Overall
Team	W	L	T	W		L		T
Juniata		–		7	–	0	–	0
Hobart		–		6	–	0	–	0
Hofstra		–		9	–	1	–	0
Carnegie Tech		–		4	–	2	–	1
Franklin & Marshall		–		4	–	2	–	1
Buffalo		–		5	–	4	–	0
Bucknell		–		3	–	6	–	0
Washington & Jefferson		–		1	–	6	–	1
Drexel		–		1	–	7	–	0
Temple		–		1	–	7	–	0

1957 Midwestern non-major college football independents records
	Conf.			Overall
Team	W	L	T	W		L		T
St. Norbert		–		8	–	0	–	0
Rose Poly		–		7	–	1	–	0
Northern Michigan		–		6	–	2	–	0
Washington University		–		5	–	3	–	0
Carthage		–		4	–	3	–	1
Wabash		–		5	–	4	–	0
Baldwin–Wallace		–		1	–	6	–	1

1957 Southern non-major college football independents records
	Conf.			Overall
Team	W	L	T	W		L		T
Louisville		–		9	–	1	–	0
Mississippi Southern		–		8	–	3	–	0
Sewanee		–		5	–	2	–	1
Tampa		–		6	–	3	–	0
Abilene Christian		–		5	–	3	–	1
Delaware		–		4	–	3	–	0
Memphis State		–		6	–	4	–	0
Chattanooga		–		4	–	5	–	1
Arkansas State		–		4	–	5	–	0
Howard (AL)		–		4	–	5	–	0
Trinity (TX)		–		3	–	5	–	0
Washington and Lee		–		0	–	8	–	0

1957 Western non-major college football independents records
	Conf.			Overall
Team	W	L	T	W		L		T
Cal Poly Pomona		–		7	–	1	–	1
Montana State		–		8	–	2	–	0
Hawaii		–		4	–	4	–	1
Pepperdine		–		3	–	6	–	0
La Verne		–		3	–	7	–	1
UC Riverside		–		1	–	4	–	1

=== NAIA standings ===
1957 Central Intercollegiate Conference football standings
	Conf.					Overall
Team	W		L		T	W		L		T
Pittsburg State $^	5	–	0	–	0	11	–	0	–	0
St. Benedict's	4	–	1	–	0	7	–	1	–	0
Fort Hays State	2	–	2	–	0	4	–	4	–	0
Washburn	2	–	3	–	0	5	–	4	–	0
Emporia State	1	–	3	–	0	2	–	7	–	0
Southwestern (KS)	0	–	5	–	0	1	–	8	–	0
$ – Conference champion; ^ – NAIA playoff participant

1957 Central Church College Conference football standings
	Conf.					Overall
Team	W		L		T	W		L		T
Dana $	3	–	0	–	0	3	–	5	–	0
Westmar	2	–	1	–	0	6	–	2	–	1
Tarkio	1	–	2	–	0	2	–	5	–	0
Concordia (NE)	0	–	3	–	0	1	–	6	–	0
$ – Conference champion

1957 College Conference of Illinois football standings
	Conf.					Overall
Team	W		L		T	W		L		T
Wheaton (IL) +	6	–	1	–	0	8	–	1	–	0
Lake Forest +	6	–	1	–	0	6	–	2	–	0
North Central (IL)	5	–	2	–	0	7	–	2	–	0
Millikin	4	–	2	–	1	4	–	3	–	1
Augustana (IL)	3	–	4	–	0	4	–	4	–	0
Carroll (WI)	2	–	5	–	0	2	–	6	–	0
Illinois Wesleyan	1	–	5	–	1	1	–	7	–	1
Elmhurst	0	–	7	–	0	1	–	7	–	0
+ – Conference co-champions

1957 Evergreen Conference football standings
	Conf.					Overall
Team	W		L		T	W		L		T
Central Washington $	6	–	0	–	0	7	–	1	–	0
Puget Sound	4	–	1	–	1	4	–	3	–	1
Western Washington	4	–	2	–	0	4	–	3	–	0
Eastern Washington	3	–	2	–	1	5	–	2	–	1
Whitworth	2	–	4	–	0	2	–	6	–	0
Pacific Lutheran	1	–	5	–	0	2	–	6	–	0
UBC	0	–	6	–	0	?	–	?	–	?
$ – Conference champion

1957 Frontier Conference football standings
	Conf.					Overall
Team	W		L		T	W		L		T
Arizona State–Flagstaff $	3	–	0	–	0	8	–	1	–	0
New Mexico Highlands	1	–	1	–	1	3	–	3	–	1
New Mexico Western	1	–	1	–	0	3	–	3	–	0
Panhandle A&M	1	–	2	–	0	3	–	6	–	0
New Mexico Military	0	–	2	–	1	1	–	2	–	1
$ – Conference champion

1957 Indiana Collegiate Conference football standings
	Conf.					Overall
Team	W		L		T	W		L		T
Saint Joseph's (IN) $	5	–	0	–	0	8	–	1	–	0
Butler	5	–	1	–	0	7	–	2	–	0
DePauw	3	–	2	–	0	6	–	2	–	0
Ball State	2	–	3	–	1	2	–	5	–	1
Valparaiso	1	–	2	–	1	4	–	2	–	2
Evansville	1	–	4	–	0	1	–	6	–	0
Indiana State	0	–	5	–	0	1	–	6	–	0
$ – Conference champion

1957 Iowa Conference football standings
	Conf.					Overall
Team	W		L		T	W		L		T
Luther $	7	–	1	–	0	8	–	1	–	0
Upper Iowa	6	–	2	–	0	6	–	3	–	0
Parsons	5	–	2	–	1	7	–	2	–	1
Simpson (IA)	4	–	4	–	0	4	–	4	–	0
Wartburg	4	–	4	–	0	5	–	4	–	0
Buena Vista	3	–	4	–	0	3	–	5	–	0
Central (IA)	2	–	4	–	1	3	–	4	–	1
Dubuque	1	–	5	–	2	1	–	5	–	2
Iowa Wesleyan	1	–	7	–	0	2	–	7	–	0
$ – Conference champion

1957 Kansas Collegiate Athletic Conference football standings
	Conf.					Overall
Team	W		L		T	W		L		T
Kansas Wesleyan $	6	–	1	–	0	8	–	1	–	0
Baker	5	–	1	–	1	6	–	2	–	1
McPherson	5	–	2	–	0	6	–	3	–	0
Bethel (KS)	5	–	2	–	0	5	–	4	–	0
Ottawa	3	–	4	–	0	4	–	5	–	0
College of Emporia	2	–	4	–	1	2	–	6	–	1
Friends	1	–	6	–	0	1	–	8	–	0
Bethany (KS)	0	–	7	–	0	0	–	8	–	0
$ – Conference champion

1957 Michigan Intercollegiate Athletic Association football standings
	Conf.					Overall
Team	W		L		T	W		L		T
Hillsdale $^	6	–	0	–	0	9	–	1	–	0
Hope	4	–	2	–	0	7	–	2	–	0
Albion	4	–	2	–	0	5	–	3	–	0
Alma	3	–	2	–	1	5	–	2	–	2
Kalamazoo	2	–	3	–	1	2	–	5	–	1
Adrian	1	–	5	–	0	3	–	5	–	0
Olivet	0	–	6	–	0	0	–	9	–	0
$ – Conference champion; ^ – NAIA playoff participant

1957 Mid-Ohio League football standings
	Conf.					Overall
Team	W		L		T	W		L		T
Bluffton $	5	–	0	–	0	7	–	2	–	0
Ashland	3	–	1	–	1	4	–	3	–	1
Defiance	3	–	2	–	0	3	–	5	–	0
Findlay	2	–	2	–	1	2	–	6	–	1
Ohio Northern	1	–	4	–	0	1	–	7	–	0
Wilmington (OH)	0	–	5	–	0	0	–	6	–	1
$ – Conference champion

1957 Midwest Conference football standings
	Conf.					Overall
Team	W		L		T	W		L		T
Ripon $	8	–	0	–	0	8	–	0	–	0
Carleton	6	–	1	–	1	6	–	1	–	1
Coe	6	–	2	–	0	6	–	2	–	0
Cornell (IA)	3	–	3	–	2	3	–	3	–	2
Grinnell	3	–	3	–	2	3	–	3	–	2
St. Olaf	4	–	4	–	0	4	–	4	–	0
Knox	1	–	6	–	1	1	–	6	–	1
Lawrence	1	–	7	–	0	1	–	7	–	0
Monmouth (IL)	1	–	7	–	0	1	–	7	–	0
$ – Conference champion

1957 Minnesota Intercollegiate Athletic Conference football standings
	Conf.					Overall
Team	W		L		T	W		L		T
Concordia (MN) $	6	–	1	–	0	7	–	2	–	0
Macalester	5	–	1	–	1	6	–	1	–	1
Gustavus Adolphus	5	–	1	–	1	5	–	3	–	1
Saint John's (MN)	4	–	3	–	0	5	–	3	–	0
Augsburg	3	–	4	–	0	4	–	4	–	0
Minnesota–Duluth	2	–	5	–	0	2	–	5	–	1
St. Thomas (MN)	1	–	5	–	1	2	–	5	–	1
Hamline	0	–	6	–	0	0	–	7	–	1
$ – Conference champion

1957 Minnesota State College Conference football standings
	Conf.					Overall
Team	W		L		T	W		L		T
Winona State +	3	–	1	–	0	5	–	3	–	0
Bemidji State +	3	–	1	–	0	4	–	4	–	0
Moorhead State	2	–	2	–	0	3	–	4	–	1
Mankato State	1	–	2	–	1	2	–	6	–	1
St. Cloud State	0	–	3	–	1	0	–	7	–	1
+ – Conference co-champions

1957 Missouri College Athletic Union football standings
	Conf.					Overall
Team	W		L		T	W		L		T
Culver–Stockton $	2	–	0	–	0	7	–	2	–	0
William Jewell	1	–	0	–	0	7	–	1	–	2
Tarkio	1	–	2	–	0	2	–	5	–	0
Central (MO)	0	–	2	–	0	2	–	6	–	0
Missouri Valley	0	–	0	–	0	4	–	2	–	0
+ – Conference co-champions; A game between Missouri Valley and William Jewell scheduled for October 26 was cancelled when more than 20 players on each team were stricken by the flu.

1957 Montana Collegiate Conference football standings
	Conf.					Overall
Team	W		L		T	W		L		T
Carroll (MT) $	2	–	0	–	1	3	–	3	–	2
Eastern Montana	2	–	1	–	0	6	–	2	–	0
Western Montana	2	–	2	–	0	3	–	4	–	1
Rocky Mountain	0	–	2	–	1	2	–	2	–	1
Montana Mines	0	–	1	–	0	0	–	6	–	0
Northern Montana *	0	–	0	–	0	2	–	3	–	0
$ – Conference champion; * – Northern Montana was not a full conference member in football until 1958.

1957 Nebraska College Conference football standings
	Conf.					Overall
Team	W		L		T	W		L		T
Hastings $	7	–	0	–	0	7	–	2	–	0
Peru State	6	–	1	–	0	7	–	2	–	0
Doane	5	–	2	–	0	6	–	2	–	0
Kearney State	4	–	3	–	0	6	–	3	–	0
Nebraska Wesleyan	3	–	4	–	0	3	–	5	–	0
Chadron State	1	–	6	–	0	2	–	6	–	0
Midland	1	–	5	–	1	3	–	5	–	1
Wayne State (NE)	0	–	6	–	1	1	–	7	–	1
$ – Conference champion; Kearney State forfeited conference wins over Peru State and Doane.

1957 North Dakota Intercollegiate Conference football standings
	Conf.					Overall
Team	W		L		T	W		L		T
Jamestown $	6	–	0	–	0	7	–	0	–	0
Minot State	5	–	1	–	0	5	–	2	–	0
Valley City State	4	–	1	–	1	4	–	2	–	1
Wahpeton Science	4	–	2	–	0	?	–	?	–	?
Dickinson State	2	–	3	–	1	2	–	4	–	1
Mayville State	2	–	4	–	0	3	–	4	–	0
Ellendale	2	–	4	–	0	?	–	?	–	?
Bismarck JC	1	–	5	–	0	?	–	?	–	?
Bottineau	0	–	6	–	0	?	–	?	–	?
$ – Conference champion

1957 North State Conference football standings
	Conf.					Overall
Team	W		L		T	W		L		T
Lenoir Rhyne $	5	–	1	–	0	8	–	2	–	1
Elon	4	–	0	–	0	6	–	0	–	0
Catawba	3	–	2	–	0	4	–	3	–	0
Western Carolina	2	–	2	–	1	2	–	5	–	1
Appalachian State	2	–	4	–	0	4	–	6	–	0
Guilford	1	–	3	–	1	1	–	6	–	1
East Carolina	0	–	5	–	0	1	–	8	–	0
$ – Conference champion

1957 Northwest Conference football standings
	Conf.					Overall
Team	W		L		T	W		L		T
Linfield $	5	–	0	–	0	8	–	1	–	0
Willamette	3	–	1	–	1	5	–	2	–	2
College of Idaho	3	–	2	–	0	5	–	5	–	0
Whitman	2	–	2	–	1	3	–	4	–	1
Lewis & Clark	1	–	4	–	0	4	–	6	–	0
Pacific (OR)	0	–	5	–	0	2	–	7	–	0
$ – Conference champion

1957 Oklahoma Collegiate Conference football standings
	Conf.					Overall
Team	W		L		T	W		L		T
SW Oklahoma State $	4	–	1	–	0	7	–	1	–	1
Northeastern State	3	–	2	–	0	7	–	3	–	0
NW Oklahoma State	3	–	2	–	0	5	–	4	–	0
Central State (OK)	2	–	2	–	0	5	–	2	–	0
SE Oklahoma State	2	–	2	–	0	4	–	4	–	0
East Central	0	–	5	–	0	2	–	7	–	0
$ – Conference champion

1957 Oregon Collegiate Conference football standings
	Conf.					Overall
Team	W		L		T	W		L		T
Southern Oregon $	3	–	0	–	1	6	–	2	–	1
Oregon College	3	–	1	–	0	5	–	3	–	0
Oregon Tech	2	–	2	–	0	6	–	4	–	0
Portland State	1	–	3	–	0	2	–	6	–	0
Eastern Oregon	0	–	3	–	1	1	–	7	–	1
$ – Conference champion

1957 Pennsylvania State Teachers College Conference football standings
	Conf.					Overall
Team	W		L		T	W		L		T
Lock Haven +	5	–	0	–	0	8	–	0	–	0
Shippensburg +	5	–	0	–	0	6	–	0	–	1
West Chester	4	–	0	–	0	9	–	0	–	0
Edinboro	2	–	1	–	0	3	–	4	–	0
Slippery Rock	2	–	1	–	0	5	–	2	–	0
Kutztown	2	–	1	–	1	3	–	4	–	1
Bloomsburg	2	–	3	–	0	5	–	2	–	1
East Stroudsburg	2	–	3	–	1	3	–	4	–	1
Indiana (PA)	2	–	2	–	0	3	–	6	–	0
Mansfield	1	–	2	–	0	3	–	3	–	0
California (PA)	1	–	4	–	0	2	–	5	–	0
Millersville	1	–	5	–	0	2	–	6	–	0
Clarion	1	–	4	–	0	2	–	6	–	0
Cheyney	0	–	4	–	0	0	–	6	–	0
+ – Conference co-champions; Conference standings were based on the Saylor system of ratings.

1957 Rocky Mountain Conference football standings
	Conf.					Overall
Team	W		L		T	W		L		T
Idaho State $	5	–	0	–	0	9	–	0	–	0
Western State (CO)	3	–	1	–	1	5	–	4	–	1
Colorado State–Greeley	3	–	2	–	0	6	–	3	–	0
Colorado College	2	–	3	–	0	3	–	5	–	0
Colorado Mines	0	–	3	–	2	0	–	6	–	3
Adams State	0	–	4	–	1	0	–	9	–	1
$ – Conference champion

1957 South Dakota Intercollegiate Conference football standings
	Conf.					Overall
Team	W		L		T	W		L		T
Huron $	7	–	0	–	0	7	–	1	–	0
Northern State	5	–	1	–	0	7	–	1	–	0
General Beadle	4	–	1	–	0	6	–	1	–	1
Southern State (SD)	4	–	2	–	0	5	–	3	–	0
South Dakota Mines	2	–	3	–	1	2	–	4	–	2
Yankton	2	–	5	–	0	2	–	6	–	0
Black Hills	1	–	4	–	1	2	–	6	–	1
Sioux Falls	1	–	4	–	0	1	–	5	–	0
Dakota Wesleyan	1	–	7	–	0	1	–	7	–	0
$ – Conference champion

1957 Southwestern Athletic Conference football standings
	Conf.					Overall
Team	W		L		T	W		L		T
Wiley $	6	–	0	–	0	10	–	0	–	1
Texas Southern	4	–	2	–	0	7	–	3	–	1
Prairie View A&M	4	–	2	–	0	6	–	3	–	1
Southern	4	–	2	–	0	6	–	4	–	0
Arkansas AM&N	2	–	4	–	0	3	–	6	–	0
Texas College	1	–	5	–	0	4	–	5	–	0
Langston	0	–	6	–	0	0	–	9	–	0
$ – Conference champion

1957 West Virginia Intercollegiate Athletic Conference football standings
	Conf.					Overall
Team	W		L		T	W		L		T
Fairmont State $	7	–	0	–	0	7	–	0	–	0
West Virginia Tech	3	–	1	–	1	4	–	4	–	1
West Virginia State	2	–	1	–	1	2	–	4	–	2
Glenville State	3	–	2	–	1	3	–	2	–	1
Concord	2	–	2	–	1	2	–	4	–	1
Shepherd	2	–	2	–	0	3	–	4	–	0
West Liberty State	2	–	3	–	1	2	–	6	–	1
Potomac State	2	–	3	–	1	2	–	4	–	1
Salem	2	–	5	–	0	2	–	5	–	0
West Virginia Wesleyan	1	–	4	–	0	1	–	6	–	0
Davis & Elkins	0	–	5	–	0	2	–	5	–	0
Bluefield State *	1	–	0	–	0	6	–	2	–	0
Bethany (WV) *	1	–	0	–	0	5	–	3	–	0
$ – Conference champion; * – Did not qualify for conference standings Conference standings based on power ratings

1957 Wisconsin State College Conference football standings
	Conf.					Overall
Team	W		L		T	W		L		T
Platteville State $	5	–	0	–	0	5	–	1	–	0
River Falls State	4	–	1	–	0	6	–	2	–	0
Whitewater State	3	–	1	–	1	5	–	2	–	1
Oshkosh State	3	–	3	–	0	4	–	3	–	0
Eau Claire State	3	–	4	–	0	3	–	5	–	0
Superior State	2	–	3	–	0	4	–	4	–	1
La Crosse State	2	–	3	–	0	4	–	5	–	0
Stevens Point State	2	–	4	–	0	3	–	4	–	0
Stout State	1	–	3	–	1	3	–	4	–	1
Milwaukee	1	–	4	–	0	2	–	6	–	0
$ – Conference champion

== Bowl games ==
=== Major bowls ===
Wednesday, January 1, 1958

Bowl	Winner		Runner-up	
Orange	No. 4 Oklahoma Sooners	48	No. 16 Duke Blue Devils	21
Sugar	No. 7 Mississippi Rebels	39	No. 11 Texas Longhorns	7
Cotton	No. 5 Navy Midshipmen	20	No. 8 Rice Owls	7
Rose	No. 2 Ohio State Buckeyes	10	No. 17 Oregon Ducks	7

=== Other bowls ===
Bowl	Location	Date	Winner	Score	Runner-up
Sun	El Paso, TX	January 1	Louisville	34–20	Drake
Gator	Jacksonville, FL	December 28	No. 13 Tennessee	3–0	No. 9 Texas A&M

=== Small college ===
Bowl	Location	Date	Winner	Score	Runner-up
Tangerine	Orlando, FL	January 1	East Texas State	10–9	Mississippi Southern

=== NAIA postseason ===
The 1957 NAIA football season was the second season of college football sponsored by the National Association of Intercollegiate Athletics. The season culminated in the second annual NAIA Football National Championship, played in 1957 at Stewart Field in St. Petersburg, Florida. During its four years in St. Petersburg, the game was also called the Holiday Bowl.

Championship; December 21, 1957; Holiday Bowl
Pittsburg State	27
Hillsdale	26

== Final polls ==
Final polls were released in the first week of December.

AP Poll
Rank	Team	1st	Points
1	Auburn	210	3,123
2	Ohio State	71	2,646
3	Michigan State	30	2,550
4	Oklahoma	22	2,182
5	Navy	6	1,915
6	Iowa	7	1,569
7	Ole Miss	3	1,316
8	Rice	-	1,186
9	Texas A&M	-	776
10	Notre Dame	-	608
11	Texas	-	409
12	Arizona State	10	324
13	Tennessee	-	175
14	Mississippi State	-	217
15	NC State	-	145
16	Duke	-	101
17	Florida	-	91
18	Army	-	89
19	Wisconsin	-	87
20	VMI	1	86

UP poll
Rank	Team	1st	Points
1	Ohio State	14	307
2	Auburn	11	290
3	Michigan State	8	283
4	Oklahoma	-	195
5	Iowa	-	192
6	Navy	-	177
7	Rice	-	117
8	Ole Miss	-	81
9	Notre Dame	-	60
10	Texas A&M	-	58
11	Texas	-	36
12	Arizona State	2	32
13	Army	-	19
13	Duke	-	19
13	Wisconsin	-	19
16	Tennessee	-	8
17	Oregon	-	7
18	Clemson	-	6
18	UCLA	-	6
20	NC State	-	5

== Undefeated teams ==
Thirteen college football teams finished the 1957 season with unbeaten and untied records:

Team	Record	Points for	Points against	Notes
Arlington State	12–0	425	62	Pioneer Conference and Junior Rose Bowl champion
Pittsburg	11–0	347	79	Central Intercollegiate, Holiday Bowl, and NAIA national champion
Arizona State	10–0	397	66	Border Conference champion, AP/UP No. 12
Auburn	10–0	207	28	SEC and AP poll national champion
Middle Tennessee	10–0	241	40	Ohio Valley Conference champion
Florida A&M	9–0	343	42	SIAC and black college national champion
Idaho State	9–0	280	85	Rocky Mountain Conference champion
Ripon	8–0	270	77	Midwest Conference champion
St. Norbert	8–0	250	84	Independent
West Chester	8–0	326	40	PSTCC champion
Fairmont State	7–0	147	42	WVIAC champion
Juniata	7–0	253	27	Independent
Hobart	6–0	141	50	Independent

== Heisman Trophy voting ==
The Heisman Trophy is given to the year's most outstanding player

Player	School	Position	1st	2nd	3rd	Total
John David Crow	Texas A&M	HB	241	176	108	1,183
Alex Karras	Iowa	DT	128	109	91	693
Walt Kowalczyk	Michigan State	HB	116	93	96	630
Lou Michaels	Kentucky	OT	60	57	36	330
Tom Forrestal	Navy	QB	34	42	46	216
Bob Anderson	Army	HB	25	45	39	204
Dan Currie	Michigan State	C	49	16	18	197
Clendon Thomas	Oklahoma	HB	21	39	44	185
Lee Grosscup	Utah	QB	21	28	28	147

== Statistical leaders ==
=== Individual ===
==== Total offense ====
The following players were the individual leaders in total offense during the 1957 season:

Major college

Rank	Player	Team	Games	Plays	Total Yds	TdR
1	Bob Newman	Washington State	10	263	1444	16
2	Bill Austin	Rutgers	9	273	1425	15
3	Dwight Nichols	Iowa State	10	311	1419	12
4	Bob Stransky	Colorado	10	215	1387	15
5	Tom Greene	Holy Cross	9	212	1381	16
6	Lee Grosscup	Utah	10	182	1274	15
7	Ken Ford	Hardin-Simmons	10	228	1247	18
8	King Hill	Rice	10	172	1244	10
9	Randy Duncan	Iowa	9	154	1183	15
10	Tom Forrestal	Navy	10	191	1169	10

Small college

Rank	Player	Team	Games	Plays	Total Yds
1	Stan Jackson	Cal Poly Pomona	9	301	2145
2	Terry Stevens	Upper Iowa	9	271	1914
3	Norm Jarock	St. Ambrose	8	187	1558
4	Jack Redwine	Florence State	10	189	1438
5	Bowlen	Oregon College of Education	8	156	1428
6	Brad Hustad	Luther	9	219	1401
6	Webb	St. Ambrose	8	228	1401
8	Fields	Whittier	9	148	1355
9	Lenny Lyles	Louisville	9	132	1346
10	Larry Magilligan	Hofstra	10	220	1343

==== Passing ====
The following players were the individual leaders in pass completions during the 1957 season:

Major college

Rank	Player	Team	Games	Compl.	Att.	Pct. Compl.	Yds.	Int.	TDs
1	Ken Ford	Hardin-Simmons	10	115	205	.561	1254	11	14
2	Bob Newman	Washington State	10	104	188	.553	1391	13	13
3	Lee Grosscup	Utah	10	94	137	.686	1398	2	10
4	Bob Winters	Utah State	10	92	179	.514	1139	9	7
5	Billy Baker	Furman	10	88	150	.587	846	5	6
6	Tom Flores	Pacific	10	82	184	.446	980	10	5
7	Tom Forrestal	Navy	10	80	159	.503	1117	17	8
8	Jon Douglas	Stanford	10	78	146	.534	957	6	10
9	Roger LaBrasca	Drake	8	74	145	.510	1054	10	12
9	Tom Greene	Holy Cross	9	74	159	.465	1297	12	11

Small college

Rank	Player	Team	Games	Compl.	Att.	Pct. Compl.	Yds.	Int.	TDs
1	Jay Roelen	Pepperdine	9	106	214	.495	1428	16	13
2	Stan Jackson	Cal Poly Pomona	9	105	231	.455	1869	8	18
3	Ken Fujii	Nevada	9	102	205	498	1116	7	6
4	Larry Magilligan	Hofstra	10	93	189	.492	1303	12	15
5	Webb	St. Ambrose	8	88	168	.524	1433	6	13
6	Green	Chattanooga	10	87	175	497	1191	19	7
7	Ayling	Alma	9	81	158	.513	1091	8	11
8	Vick	Evansville	7	79	152	.520	1180	12	7
9	Parrish	Linfield	9	76	160	.475	1102	12	17
10	Sochor	San Francisco State	10	72	124	.581	1050	11	15
17	Bobby Beathard	Cal Poly	9	63	126	.500	884	8	3
18	Goodnight	DePauw	8	62	99	.626	946	4	11

==== Rushing ====
The following players were the individual leaders in rushing yards during the 1957 season:
Major college

Rank	Player	Team	Games	Yds	Rushes	Avg
1	Leon Burton	Arizona State	10	1126	117	9.62
2	Bob Stransky	Colorado	10	1097	183	5.99
3	Bob Anderson	Army	9	983	153	6.42
4	Bill Austin	Rutgers	9	946	193	4.90
5	Chuck Shea	Stanford	10	840	163	5.15
6	Jim Bakhtiar	Virginia	10	822	194	4.24
7	Clendon Thomas	Oklahoma	10	816	130	6.28
8	Jim Taylor	LSU	10	762	162	4.70
9	Nub Beamer	Oregon State	10	760	173	4.39
10	Wray Carlton	Duke	10	749	143	5.24
11	Don Perkins	New Mexico	10	744	112	6.64
12	Bob McAniff	Cornell	9	700	140	5.00
13	Jim Shofner	TCU	10	682	131	5.21
14	Bobby Mulgado	Arizona State	10	681	121	5.63
15	Pete Hart	Hardin-Simmons	10	669	120	5.58
16	Bobby Cravens	Kentucky	10	669	141	4.74
17	Dwight Nichols	Iowa State	10	668	211	3.17
18	Pete Dawkins	Army	9	665	124	5.36
19	Jim Pace	Michigan	9	664	123	5.40
20	Jim Shanley	Oregon	10	664	168	3.95

Small college

Rank	Player	Team	Games	Yds	Rushes	Avg
1	Brad Hustad	Luther	9	1401	219	6.40
2	Fields	Whittier	9	1355	148	9.16
3	Norm Jarock	St. Norbert	8	1306	148	8.82
4	Lenny Lyles	Louisville	9	1201	123	9.76
5	Walter Beach	Central Michigan	10	1084	140	7.74
6	Dick Maggard	College of Idaho	10	1049	176	5.96
7	Tom Dingle	Wooster	9	1022	179	5.71
8	Polkinghorne	Washington U.	8	1009	156	6.47
9	Smith	Denison	9	996	151	6.60
10	Fingerhut	Saint Joseph's	9	982	133	7.38

==== Receiving ====
The following players were the individual leaders in receptions during the 1957 season:

Major college

Rank	Player	Team	Games	Receptions	Receiving Yards	Touchdowns
1	Stuart Vaughan	Utah	10	53	756	5
2	Gary Kapp	Utah State	10	45	633	4
3	Don Ellingsen	Washington State	10	45	559	4
4	Fred Dugan	Dayton	10	37	546	3
5	Jim Gibbons	Iowa	9	36	587	4
6	Al Jamison	Colgate	9	33	420	6
7	Jerry Mertens	Drake	8	29	509	6
8	Gene Leek	Arizona	10	29	310	1
9	Chuck Chatfield	Pacific	10	28	404	1
10	Pete Jokanovich	Navy	28	339	9	

Small college

Rank	Player	Team	Games	Receptions	Receiving Yards	Touchdowns
1	Jim Whitaker	Nevada	9	40	527	4
2	Donald Baldwin	Hofstra	10	39	479	6
3	Lawson Persley	Mississippi Vocational	8	36	667	7
4	Ron Crecco	Marietta	8	36	580	2
5	Don Hogan	Cal Poly Pomona	9	35	660	7
6	Larry Gates	Evansville	7	33	556	4
7	Bob Herrick	North Dakota	8	33	542	6
8	Walker	San Diego	9	33	452	6
9	Rudy Osuna	Pepperdine	9	33	346	3
10	Clint Westemeyer	St. Ambrose	8	31	553	4

==== Scoring ====
The following players were the individual leaders in scoring during the 1957 season:

Major college

Rank	Player	Team	Pts	TD	PAT	FG
1	Leon Burton	Arizona State	96	16	0	0
2	Bobby Mulgado	Arizona State	93	9	36	1
3	Jim Taylor	LSU	86	12	14	0
4	Bob Anderson	Army	84	14	0	0
5	Dick Christy	NC State	83	13	2	1
6	Billy Atkins	Auburn	82	11	13	1
7	Joe Belland	Arizona State	78	13	0	0
8	Bob Stransky	Colorado	77	12	5	0
9	Bill Austin	Rutgers	74	12	2	0
10	Wray Carlton	Duke	71	10	11	0
11	Pete Dawkins	Army	66	11	0	0
11	Merrill Douglas	Utah	66	11	0	0
13	Overton Curtis	Utah State	63	9	6	1
14	Jim Wiggins	Oklahoma State	62	10	2	0
15	Oldham	Navy	61	7	19	0
16	Albert Korpak	Detroit	60	8	12	0
16	Jim Pace	Michigan	60	10	0	0
17	Maynard	Texas Western	59	8	11	0
18	Bobby Jordan	VMI	56	9	2	0
19	Jim Shanley	Oregon	54	9	0	0
19	Bobby Gordon	Tennessee	54	9	0	0
19	Eddie Dove	Colorado	54	9	0	0
19	Don Clark	Ohio State	54	9	0	0
19	Walt Kowalczyk	Michigan State	54	9	0	0
19	Joe Francis	Oregon State	54	9	0	0
19	Claude Chaney	Dayton	54	9	0	0
19	Jack Fanning	Washington State	54	9	0	0
19	Clendon Thomas	Oklahoma	54	9	0	0

Small college

Rank	Player	Team	Pts	TD	PAT	FG
1	Lenny Lyles	Louisville	132	21	6	0
2	Bill Groman	Heidelberg	114	19	0	0
3	Mohlman	St. Benedict's	109	16	13	0
4	Bullard	Lenoir Rhyne	102	17	0	0
4	Jarock	St. Norbert	102	17	0	0
4	Herakovich	Rose Poly	102	17	0	0
7	Iglehart	Wiley	97	12	25	0
8	Henley	Huron	96	16	0	0
9	Philpott	Fresno State	94	14	10	0
10	Abrahamian	Tufts	92	14	8	0

=== Team ===
==== Total offense ====
The following teams were the leaders in total offense during the 1957 season:

Major college

Rank	Team	Games played	Total plays	Yards gained	Yards per game
1	Arizona State	10	672	4449	444.9
2	Colorado	10	743	4152	415.2
3	Navy	10	719	3844	384.4
4	Iowa	9	599	3459	384.3
5	Michigan State	9	669	3455	383.9
6	Army	9	648	3376	375.1
7	Oklahoma	10	776	3600	360.0
8	Ole Miss	10	673	3556	355.6
9	Utah	10	628	3476	347.6
9	Rice	10	672	3476	347.6

Small college

Rank	Team	Games played	Total plays	Yards gained	Yards per game
1	Denison	9	631	3877	430.8
2	Ripon	8	485	3418	427.3
3	Florida A&M	7	399	2913	416.1
4	Saint Joseph's	9	620	3700	411.1
5	St. Norbert	8	547	3242	405.3
6	Lincoln (MO)	9	564	3523	391.4
7	Amherst	8	594	3120	390.0
8	Williams	7	459	2712	387.4
9	William Jewell	9	574	3482	386.9
10	Tufts	8	540	3033	379.1

==== Rushing offense ====
The following teams were the leaders in rushing offense during the 1957 season:

Major college

Rank	Team	Yards per game
1	Colorado	322.4
2	Ole Miss	305.7
3	Ohio State	297.9
4	Army	297.1
5	Oklahoma	297.0
6	Arizona State	292.2
7	Wisconsin	270.8
8	Michigan State	263.0
9	Princeton	258.1
10	Miami (FL)	254.0

Small college

Rank	Team	Yards per game
1	Denison	372.1
2	Florida A&M	359.7
3	Lincoln (MO)	351.8
4	Saint Joseph's	350.9
5	Tufts	339.3
6	Luther	329.4
7	St. Norbert	310.6
8	Whittier	304.1
9	William Jewell	302.9
10	Louisville	298.9

==== Passing offense ====
The following teams were the leaders in passing offense during the 1957 season:

Major college

Rank	Team	Yards per game
1	Utah	195.2
2	Washington State	180.8
3	Holy Cross	167.6
4	Arizona	154.0
5	Drake	153.9
6	Arizona State	152.7
7	Hardin-Simmons	151.0
8	Navy	146.9
9	Iowa	143.2
10	Penn State	131.9

Small college

Rank	Team	Yards per game
1	Cal Poly Pomona	236.0
2	St. Ambrose	191.5
3	Mississippi Vocational	182.6
4	Hillsdale	169.6
5	Evansville	168.7
6	Pepperdine	166.8
7	Ripon	160.5
8	Grambling	158.3
9	North Dakota	157.5
10	Upper Iowa	153.9

==== Total defense ====
The following teams were the leaders in total defense during the 1957 season:

Major college

Rank	Team	Games played	Total plays	Yards gained	Yards per game
1	Auburn	10	529	1330	133.0
2	Navy	10	554	1626	162.6
3	Georgia Tech	10	546	1778	177.8
4	Tennessee	10	574	1847	184.7
5	Michigan State	9	556	1724	191.6
6	Miami (FL)	10	579	2002	200.2
7	TCU	10	570	2022	202.2
8	Florida	9	494	1822	202.4
9	Cincinnati	10	556	2065	206.5
10	Ole Miss	10	561	2074	207.4

Small college

Rank	Team	Games played	Total plays	Yards gained	Yards per game
1	West Chester	9	462	812	90.2
2	Florida A&M	7	319	739	105.6
3	Livingstone	9	428	1059	117.7
4	Saint Joseph's	9	463	1073	119.2
5	Susquehanna	6	284	724	120.7
6	Norfolk State	6	250	751	125.2
7	Juniata	7	378	905	129.3
8	Shaw	8	399	1077	134.6
9	St. Augustine's	7	299	976	139.4
10	North Carolina A&T	8	414	1154	144.3

==== Rushing defense ====
The following teams were the leaders in rushing defense during the 1957 season:

Major college

Rank	Team	Yards per game
1	Auburn	67.4
2	Miami (FL)	99.8
3	Arizona State	103.5
4	Princeton	108.2
5	Navy	109.6
6	Iowa	112.7
7	Boston College	114.7
8	Michigan State	117.2
9	Cincinnati	122.0
10	Syracuse	123.0

Small college

Rank	Team	Yards per game
1	West Chester	27.9
2	Florida A&M	48.1
3	Allen	71.6
4	Prairie View	73.0
5	South Carolina State	74.3
6	Juniata	75.6
7	Norfolk State	77.5
8	Saint Joseph's	77.9
9	Buffalo	78.1
10	Livingstone	81.8

==== Passing defense ====
The following teams were the leaders in passing defense during the 1957 season:

Major college

Rank	Team	Yards per game
1	Georgia Tech	33.4
2	Missouri	40.3
3	Tulane	41.3
4	VPI	48.5
5	Ole Miss	50.0
6	Tennessee	50.1
7	Navy	53.0
7	Florida	53.0
9	Kentucky	53.1
10	Texas A&M	53.4

Small college

Rank	Team	Yards per game
1	Lake Forest	25.0
2	North Carolina College	29.7
3	Haverford	31.7
4	Livingstone	34.1
5	South Carolina State	34.9
6	Vermont	35.8
7	Howard	36.6
8	Susquehanna	37.5
9	Coe	38.9
10	Wilkes	40.1

== See also ==
- 1957 College Football All-America Team
