= Jerry Thompson (American football) =

American football and baseball player and coach (1923–2010)

Biographical details
- Born: March 25, 1923; Baldwin, Wisconsin, U.S.
- Died: December 23, 2010 (aged 87); Barron, Wisconsin, U.S.

Playing career

Football
- 1941–1943: St. Olaf
- 1944–1945: Wisconsin

Baseball
- 1945: Wisconsin

Track
- 1945: Wisconsin
- Positions: Fullback, halfback (football)

Coaching career (HC unless noted)

Football
- 1946: Manistique HS (MI)
- 1947: Upsala
- 1948–1950: Augustana (SD)
- 1951–1955: Neenah HS (WI)
- 1956–1957: Ripon

Baseball
- 1950–1951: Augustana (SD)

Administrative career (AD unless noted)
- 1946–1947: Ripon

Head coaching record
- Overall: 21–28–1 (college football); 1–6 (baseball)

Accomplishments and honors

Championships
- 1 MWC (1957)

Herman Jerome Thompson (March 25, 1923 – December 23, 2010) was an American football and baseball player and coach. He served as the head football coach at Upsala College in East Orange, New Jersey in 1947, Augustana University in Sioux Falls, South Dakota from 1948 to 1950, and Ripon College in Ripon, Wisconsin from 1956 to 1957. Thompson was also the head baseball coach at Augustana from 1950 to 1951.

Thompson played college football at St. Olaf College and the University of Wisconsin. He also lettered in baseball and track at Wisconsin in 1945. After graduating from Wisconsin in 1946, Thompson began his coaching career that fall as the football coach at Manistique High School in Manistique, Michigan.

Thompson was also a professor of physical education as Augustana. He resigned from his position has Augustana in 1951 to become head football and head track coach at Neenah High School in Neenah, Wisconsin. He led his football teams at Neenah to a record of 30–6–3 in five seasons.

== Head coaching record ==
=== College football ===
Year	Team	Overall	Conference	Standing	Bowl/playoffs
Upsala Vikings (Independent) (1947)
1947	Upsala	2–6			
Upsala:		2–6			
Augustana (South Dakota) Vikings (North Central Conference) (1948–1950)
1948	Augustana	3–6	2–4	T–4th	
1949	Augustana	2–6	1–5	6th	
1950	Augustana	2–7	1–5	6th	
Augustana:		7–19	4–14		
Ripon Redmen (Midwest Conference) (1956–1957)
1956	Ripon	4–3–1	4–3–1	4th	
1957	Ripon	8–0	8–0	1st	
Ripon:		12–3–1	12–3–1		
Total:		21–28–1			
National championship Conference title Conference division title or championship game berth
