= 1963 Ripon Redmen football team =

American college football season

1963 Ripon Redmen football

MWC champion
- Conference: Midwest Conference
- Record: 8–0 (8–0 MWC)
- Head coach: John Storzer (6th season)
- Captain: Dick Willich
- Home stadium: Ingall Field

1963 Midwest Conference football standings
	Conf.					Overall
Team	W		L		T	W		L		T
Ripon $	8	–	0	–	0	8	–	0	–	0
Carleton	5	–	2	–	1	5	–	2	–	1
Cornell (IA)	5	–	3	–	0	5	–	3	–	0
Grinnell	5	–	3	–	0	5	–	3	–	0
Beloit	3	–	3	–	2	3	–	3	–	2
Coe	4	–	4	–	0	4	–	4	–	0
St. Olaf	4	–	4	–	0	4	–	4	–	0
Lawrence	3	–	4	–	1	3	–	4	–	1
Knox	1	–	7	–	0	1	–	7	–	0
Monmouth (IL)	0	–	8	–	0	0	–	8	–	0
$ – Conference champion

The 1963 Ripon Redmen football team was an American football team that represented Ripon College as a member of the Midwest Conference (MWC) during the 1963 NCAA College Division football season. In their sixth year under head coach John Storzer, the Redmen compiled a perfect 8–0 record (8–0 in conference games), won the MWC championship, shut out four of eight opponents, and outscored all opponents by a total of 241 to 65. It was Ripon's first perfect season since 1957.

The team gave up an average of 66.8 passing yards, 188 total yards and 8.1 points per game which rank as the first, third, and fifth best in Ripon football history.

Quarterback Jack Ankerson known as "Mister Touchdown", led the nation's small-college players with 145 points scored (18 touchdowns, 28 extra points, and three Field goals) and won third-team honors on the 1963 Little All-America college football team.

Other statistical leaders included Ankerson with 1,128 passing yards and 1,490 yards of total offense; back and team captain Dick Willich with 541 rushing yards on 118 carries; and Dick Bennett with 21 receptions for 339 yards.

Six Ripon players were selected by MWC coaches as first-team players on the all-conference team: quarterback Jack Ankerson; halfback Dick Willich; offensive end Doug Bradley; Mike Vinyard; junior center Phil Holm; junior middle guard Pete Cooper; and junior defensive halfback Jim Cahoon.

The team played its home games at Ingall Field (sometimes referred to as Ingall's Field) in Ripon, Wisconsin.

== Schedule ==
Date	Opponent	Site	Result	Source
September 21	at Grinnell	Grinnell, IA	W 34–0	
September 28	Monmouth (IL)	Ingall Field; Ripon, WI	W 35–0	
October 5	Coe	Ingall Field; Ripon, WI	W 35–8	
October 12	Carleton	Ingall Field; Ripon, WI	W 27–7	
October 19	Lawrence	Ingall Field; Ripon, WI (rivalry)	W 28–0	
October 26	at St. Olaf	Northfield, MN	W 27–19	
November 2	at Cornell (IA)	Mount Vernon, IA	W 35–31	
November 9	Beloit	Ingall Field; Ripon, WI	W 20–0	
