= Don Warhurst =

American football coach and college athletics administrator

Biographical details
- Born: c. 1920
- Died: November 10, 2001 (aged 81); Pomona, California, U.S.

Coaching career (HC unless noted)
- c. 1949: Santa Ana HS (CA) (assistant)
- 1950: San Bernardino Valley (line)
- 1951–1956: Modesto HS (CA)
- 1957–1966: Cal Poly Pomona

Administrative career (AD unless noted)
- 1969–1980: Cal Poly Pomona

Head coaching record
- Overall: 56–33–2 (college)

Don Warhurst (c. 1920 – November 10, 2001) was an American football coach and college athletics administrator. He served as the head football coach at California State Polytechnic University, Pomona from 1957 to 1966, compiling record of 56–33–2. Warhurst was the athletic director at the school from 1969 to 1980.

Warhust was a graduate of the University of California, Berkeley. He was an assistant coach at Santa Ana High School before serving as line coach at San Bernardino Valley College in 1950. From 1951 to 1956, Warhust was the head football coach at Modesto High School. He died at the age of 81, on November 10, 2001, the Pomona Valley Hospital Medical Center in Pomona, California.

== Head coaching record ==
Year	Team	Overall	Conference	Standing	Bowl/playoffs	UPI small college^{#}
Cal Poly Pomona Broncos (NCAA College Division independent) (1957–1966)
1957	Cal Poly Pomona	7–1–1				
1958	Cal Poly Pomona	7–3				
1959	Cal Poly Pomona	7–1–1				
1960	Cal Poly Pomona	7–2				
1961	Cal Poly Pomona	6–3				
1962	Cal Poly Pomona	9–1				13
1963	Cal Poly Pomona	2–7				
1964	Cal Poly Pomona	1–6				
1965	Cal Poly Pomona	4–5				
1966	Cal Poly Pomona	5–5				
Cal Poly Pomona:		56–33–2				
Total:		56–33–2				
