= 1957 St. Norbert Green Knights football team =

American college football season

1957 St. Norbert Green Knights football
- Conference: Independent
- Record: 8–0
- Head coach: Mel Nicks (5th season)
- Home stadium: J. R. Minahan Stadium

1957 Midwestern non-major college football independents records
	Conf.			Overall
Team	W	L	T	W		L		T
St. Norbert		–		8	–	0	–	0
Rose Poly		–		7	–	1	–	0
Northern Michigan		–		6	–	2	–	0
Washington University		–		5	–	3	–	0
Carthage		–		4	–	3	–	1
Wabash		–		5	–	4	–	0
Baldwin–Wallace		–		1	–	6	–	1

The 1957 St. Norbert Green Knights football team was an American football team that represented St. Norbert College as an independent during the 1957 college football season. In their fifth year under head coach Mel Nicks, the Knights compiled a perfect 8–0 record and outscored opponents by a total of 250 to 84. The team played home games at Minahan Stadium in De Pere, Wisconsin.

== Schedule ==
Date	Opponent	Site	Result	Attendance	Source
September 14	Eau Claire State	Minahan Stadium; De Pere, WI	W 33–6		
September 21	Carroll (WI)	Minahan Stadium; De Pere, WI	W 38–13		
September 28	at Mankato State	Mankato, MN	W 14–6		
October 6	at Loras	Dubuque, IA	W 29–7		
October 12	St. Ambrose	Minahan Stadium; De Pere, WI	W 33–20		
October 26	at Whitewater State	Whitewater, WI	W 19–7		
November 2	Michigan Tech	Minahan Stadium; De Pere, WI	W 43–19		
November 9	La Crosse State	Minahan Stadium; De Pere, WI	W 41–6		
