= 1957 South Dakota Coyotes football team =

American college football season

1957 South Dakota Coyotes football
- Conference: North Central Conference
- Record: 4–4–1 (3–2–1 NCC)
- Head coach: Ralph Stewart (2nd season)
- Home stadium: Inman Field

1957 North Central Conference football standings
	Conf.					Overall
Team	W		L		T	W		L		T
South Dakota State $	5	–	0	–	1	6	–	2	–	1
Morningside	4	–	1	–	1	6	–	2	–	1
Iowa State Teachers	4	–	2	–	0	5	–	3	–	0
South Dakota	3	–	2	–	1	4	–	4	–	1
North Dakota State	2	–	3	–	1	3	–	4	–	1
Augustana (SD)	0	–	5	–	0	0	–	7	–	0
North Dakota	0	–	5	–	0	0	–	8	–	0
$ – Conference champion

The 1957 South Dakota Coyotes football team was an American football team that represented the University of South Dakota as a member of the North Central Conference (NCC) during the 1957 college football season. In their second season under head coach Ralph Stewart, the Coyotes compiled a 4–4–1 record (3–2–1 against NCC opponents), finished in fourth place out of seven teams in the NCC, and were outscored by a total of 146 to 140. They played their home games at Inman Field in Vermillion, South Dakota.

== Schedule ==
Date	Opponent	Site	Result	Attendance	Source
September 14	at Southeast Missouri State*	Houck Stadium; Cape Girardeau, MO	W 21–0		
September 21	at North Dakota State	Dacotah Field; Fargo, ND	W 6–0	2,500	
September 28	Augustana (SD)	Inman Field; Vermillion, SD	W 20–7		
October 5	North Dakota	Inman Field; Vermillion, SD (Sitting Bull Trophy)	T 27–27		
October 12	Morningside	Inman Field; Vermillion, SD	W 27–6	8,000	
October 19	at South Dakota State	State Field; Brookings, SD (Hobo Day, rivalry)	L 13–21		
October 26	Washington University*	Inman Field; Vermillion, SD	L 19–25		
November 2	at Iowa State Teachers	O. R. Latham Field; Cedar Falls, IA	L 7–27		
November 16	at Iowa State*	Clyde Williams Field; Ames, IA	L 0–33	6,000	
*Non-conference game
