= 1957 Lehigh Engineers football team =

American college football season

1957 Lehigh Engineers football

Middle Three champion Lambert Cup
- Conference: Middle Three Conference
- Record: 8–1 (2–0 Middle Three)
- Head coach: Bill Leckonby (12th season)
- Captains: Dan Nolan; Pete Williams
- Home stadium: Taylor Stadium

1957 Middle Three Conference football standings
	Conf.					Overall
Team	W		L		T	W		L		T
Lehigh $	2	–	0	–	0	8	–	1	–	0
Rutgers	1	–	1	–	0	5	–	4	–	0
Lafayette	0	–	2	–	0	4	–	4	–	0
$ – Conference champion

The 1957 Lehigh Engineers football team was an American football team that represented Lehigh University during the 1957 college football season. Lehigh won the Middle Three Conference championship and the inaugural small-college Lambert Cup.

In their 12th year under head coach Bill Leckonby, the Engineers compiled an 8–1 record, defeating both of their conference opponents. Dan Nolan and Pete Williams were the team captains.

In December, the Engineers were the first-ever recipients of the Lambert Cup, an award for the season's best small-college football team in the East. Lehigh was honored alongside Navy, which won the large-college Lambert Trophy; both were lauded as proof that a university could field a competitive football team without compromising its academic standards.

Lehigh played its home games at Taylor Stadium on the university campus in Bethlehem, Pennsylvania.

== Schedule ==
Date	Opponent	Site	Result	Attendance	Source
September 28	at Delaware*	Delaware Stadium; Newark, DE (rivalry)	W 19–14	7,140	
October 5	at Western Reserve*	Clarke Field; Cleveland, OH	W 27–6	2,000	
October 12	Gettysburg*	Taylor Stadium; Bethlehem, PA	W 20–7	12,000	
October 19	at Rutgers	Rutgers Stadium; Piscataway, NJ	W 13–7	16,000	
October 26	at Columbia*	Baker Field; New York, NY	W 40–6	12,000	
November 2	Bucknell*	Taylor Stadium; Bethlehem, PA	W 27–0	5,000	
November 9	VMI*	Taylor Stadium; Bethlehem, PA	L 7–12	13,500	
November 16	at Buffalo*	Rotary Field; Buffalo, NY	W 27–7	8,500	
November 23	Lafayette	Taylor Stadium; Bethlehem, PA (The Rivalry)	W 26–13	17,000	
*Non-conference game
