= 1957 Rutgers Scarlet Knights football team =

American college football season

1957 Rutgers Scarlet Knights football
- Conference: Middle Three Conference
- Record: 5–4 (1–1 Middle Three)
- Head coach: John Stiegman (2nd season)
- Captain: Richard Pfeiffer
- Home stadium: Rutgers Stadium

1957 Middle Three Conference football standings
	Conf.					Overall
Team	W		L		T	W		L		T
Lehigh $	2	–	0	–	0	8	–	1	–	0
Rutgers	1	–	1	–	0	5	–	4	–	0
Lafayette	0	–	2	–	0	4	–	4	–	0
$ – Conference champion

The 1957 Rutgers Scarlet Knights football team represented Rutgers University in the 1957 college football season. In their second season under head coach John Stiegman, the Scarlet Knights compiled a 5–4 record and outscored their opponents 181 to 133. The team's statistical leaders included Billy Austin with 479 passing yards and 946 rushing yards and Bob Simms with 180 receiving yards.

== Schedule ==
Date	Opponent	Site	Result	Attendance	Source
September 28	at Princeton*	Palmer Stadium; Princeton, NJ (rivalry)	L 0–7	21,150	
October 5	Connecticut*	Rutgers Stadium; Piscataway, NJ	W 14–7	5,500	
October 12	at Colgate*	Colgate Athletic Field; Hamilton, NY	W 48–6	7,000	
October 19	Lehigh^{†}	Rutgers Stadium; Piscataway, NJ	L 7–13	16,000	
October 26	Richmond*	Rutgers Stadium; Piscataway, NJ	W 26–13	5,000	
November 2	Delaware*	Rutgers Stadium; Piscataway, NJ	L 19–23	5,500	
November 9	at Lafayette	Fisher Field; Easton, PA	W 34–19	8,000	
November 16	at William & Mary*	Cary Field; Williamsburg, VA	L 7–38	9,000	
November 23	at Columbia*	Baker Field; New York, NY	W 26–7	10,000	
*Non-conference game; ^{†}Homecoming
