= 1957 Drexel Dragons football team =

American college football season

1957 Drexel Dragons football
- Conference: Independent
- Record: 1–7
- Head coach: Eddie Allen (8th season)
- Captain: Jack Eidenberg
- Home stadium: Drexel Field

1957 Eastern non-major college football independents records
	Conf.			Overall
Team	W	L	T	W		L		T
Juniata		–		7	–	0	–	0
Hobart		–		6	–	0	–	0
Hofstra		–		9	–	1	–	0
Carnegie Tech		–		4	–	2	–	1
Franklin & Marshall		–		4	–	2	–	1
Buffalo		–		5	–	4	–	0
Bucknell		–		3	–	6	–	0
Washington & Jefferson		–		1	–	6	–	1
Drexel		–		1	–	7	–	0
Temple		–		1	–	7	–	0

The 1957 Drexel Dragons football team represented the Drexel Institute of Technology (renamed Drexel University in 1970) as an independent during the 1957 college football season. Eddie Allen was the team's head coach.

== Schedule ==
Date	Time	Opponent	Site	Result	Attendance	Source
September 28		New Haven	Bowen Memorial Field; New Haven, CT	L 2–33		
October 5		Juniata	Drexel Field; Philadelphia, PA	L 0–47		
October 12		Ursinus	Drexel Field; Philadelphia, PA	L 6–12		
October 18	8:00 pm	at West Chester	Wayne Field; West Chester, PA	L 0–39		
October 26		at Pennsylvania Military	Chester, PA	L 6–26		
November 2		Lebanon Valley^{†}	Drexel Field; Philadelphia, PA	L 0–20	6,000	
November 9		at Western Maryland	Westminster, MD	L 0–25		
November 16		Coast Guard	Drexel Field; Philadelphia, PA	W 6–0		
^{†}Homecoming; All times are in Eastern time

== Roster ==
1957 Drexel Dragons football team roster
Players
Coaches
Offense

Pos.	#	Name	Class
TE		Art Barnes	Sr
C	33	Jack Eidenberg (C)	Sr
HB	14	Tony Spadaccini	Sr
HB	18	Al Rosenstein
FB		Mike Piernock (I)
QB	19	Tom O'Connor
QB		Ed Kolongowski
G, LB		Ed Schmidt
[[American football positions|]]		Ken Suter
[[American football positions|]]		Walt Hunter
[[American football positions|]]	28	John Lesniewski
[[American football positions|]]		Hank Gritz
[[American football positions|]]		Frank Garofolo
[[American football positions|]]		Don Whitney
[[American football positions|]]		Howie Bates
[[American football positions|]]		Frank Bell
[[American football positions|]]		Dick Medoff	Sr
[[American football positions|]]		Dick Carson	Sr
HB		Sal Gambone	Sr
[[American football positions|]]		Bill Alter
[[American football positions|]]		Bob DeColli

Defense

Pos.	#	Name	Class

Special teams

Pos.	#	Name	Class

Head coach

- Eddie Allen (Penn)

Coordinators/assistant coaches

- Jack Hinkle (Syracuse)

Legend

- (C) Team captain
- (S) Suspended
- (I) Ineligible
- Injured
- Redshirt
