= Bill Connor (American football, born 1939) =

American football, baseball, and wrestling coach

Biographical details
- Born: 1939 (age 86–87)

Coaching career (HC unless noted)

Football
- c. 1965: Sussex Hamilton HS (WI)
- 1967–1973: Ripon (DC)
- 1973–1975: Ripon
- 1976–1977: Lock Haven
- 1978–1980: Montana Tech
- 1981–1984: Pacific (OR)
- 1987: Mary
- 1988–1989: Wisconsin–Superior

Baseball
- 1972: Ripon
- 1976: Ripon

Wrestling
- c. 1965: Sussex Hamilton HS (WI)
- 1970s: Ripon

Administrative career (AD unless noted)
- c. 1984: Pacific (OR)

Head coaching record
- Overall: 42–77–4 (college football); 10–20–1 (college baseball)

Accomplishments and honors

Championships
- Football; 1 Frontier (1979)

Bill Connor (born 1939) is an American former football, baseball, and wrestling coach. He served as the head football coach Ripon College in Ripon, Wisconsin from 1973 to 1975, Lock Haven State College (now known as Lock Haven University of Pennsylvania) from 1976 to 1977, Montana College of Mineral Science and Technology (now known as Montana Technological University) from 1978 to 1980, Pacific University in Forest Grove, Oregon from 1981 to 1984, and the University of Wisconsin–Superior from 1988 to 1989, compiling a career college football coaching record of 44–77–4. Connor also coached baseball and wrestling at Ripon.

Connor graduated from Messmer High School in Milwaukee and the University of Wisconsin–La Crosse. He joined the football coaching staff at Ripon as an assistant in 1967.

== Head coaching record ==
=== College football ===
Year	Team	Overall	Conference	Standing	Bowl/playoffs
Ripon Redmen (Midwest Conference) (1973–1975)
1973	Ripon	1–1 (Note: John Storzer coached the first seven games of the 1973 season before he died. Connor was appointed acting head coach and Ripon for the final two games of the season. The Redmen finished 5–3–1 overall and 5–2–1 in Midwest Collegiate Athletic Conference play, tying for third place.)	1–1	T–3rd	
1974	Ripon	7–2	5–2	T–2nd	
1975	Ripon	6–3	6–2	T–2nd	
Ripon:		14–6	12–5		
Lock Haven Bald Eagles (Pennsylvania State Athletic Conference) (1976–1977)
1976	Lock Haven	2–8	0–6	7th (West)	
1977	Lock Haven	5–5	3–3	4th (West)	
Lock Haven:		7–13	3–9		
Montana Tech Orediggers (Frontier Conference) (1978–1980)
1978	Montana Tech	2–4–2	2–1–1	T–2nd	
1979	Montana Tech	6–2–1	4–0	1st	
1980	Montana Tech	4–6	3–3	3rd	
Montana Tech:		12–12–3	9–4–1		
Pacific Boxers (Northwest Conference) (1981–1984)
1981	Pacific	0–9	0–5	6th	
1982	Pacific	2–7	2–3	4th	
1983	Pacific	4–5	1–4	T–5th	
1984	Pacific	2–6–1	1–3	T–3rd	
Pacific:		8–27–1	4–15		
Wisconsin–Superior Yellowjackets (Wisconsin State University Athletic Conference) (1988–1989)
1988	Wisconsin–Superior	0–10	0–8	9th	
1989	Wisconsin–Superior	1–9	0–8	9th	
Wisconsin–Superior:		1–19	0–16		
Total:		42–77–4			
National championship Conference title Conference division title or championship game berth
