= 1957 Juniata Indians football team =

American college football season

1957 Juniata Indians football
- Conference: Independent
- Record: 7–0
- Head coach: Kenneth Bunn (2nd season)
- Captains: Bernie McQuown; Bill Schott
- Home stadium: College Field

1957 Eastern non-major college football independents records
| | Conf. | | | Overall |
| Team | W | L | T | W | | L | | T |
|---|---|---|---|---|---|---|---|---|
| Juniata | | – | | 7 | – | 0 | – | 0 |
| Hobart | | – | | 6 | – | 0 | – | 0 |
| Hofstra | | – | | 9 | – | 1 | – | 0 |
| Carnegie Tech | | – | | 4 | – | 2 | – | 1 |
| Franklin & Marshall | | – | | 4 | – | 2 | – | 1 |
| Buffalo | | – | | 5 | – | 4 | – | 0 |
| Bucknell | | – | | 3 | – | 6 | – | 0 |
| Washington & Jefferson | | – | | 1 | – | 6 | – | 1 |
| Drexel | | – | | 1 | – | 7 | – | 0 |
| Temple | | – | | 1 | – | 7 | – | 0 |

The 1957 Juniata Indians football team was an American football team that represented Juniata College as an independent during the 1957 college football season. In their second year under head coach Kenneth Bunn, the Indians compiled a perfect 7–0 record and outscored opponents by a total of 253 to 27.

Juniata fullback Bill Berrier tied for the Pennsylvania state collegiate football scoring championship. Berrier's identical twin brother, Jim Berrier, played halfback for the team.

The 1957 season was part of a seven-year run from 1953 to 1959 during which Juniata compiled a record of 50–2–2, including five undefeated seasons.

The team played its home games at College Field in Huntingdon, Pennsylvania.

== Schedule ==
| Date | Opponent | Site | Result | Source |
|---|---|---|---|---|
| October 5 | at Drexel | Drexel Field; Philadelphia, PA | W 47–0 | |
| October 19 | Kutztown | College Field; Huntingdon, PA | W 46–0 | |
| October 26 | Westminster (PA) | College Field; Huntingdon, PA | W 26–7 | |
| November 2 | Wilkes | College Field; Huntingdon, PA | W 38–0 | |
| November 9 | at Pennsylvania Military | Chester, PA | W 14–0 | |
| November 16 | at Albright | Reading, PA | W 40–3 | |
| November 23 | Ursinus | College Field; Huntingdon, PA | W 42–7 | |
