= 1957 Cal Poly Pomona Broncos football team =

American college football season

1957 Cal Poly Pomona Broncos football
- Conference: Independent
- Record: 7–1–1
- Head coach: Don Warhurst (3rd season)

1957 Western non-major college football independents records
| | Conf. | | | Overall |
| Team | W | L | T | W | | L | | T |
|---|---|---|---|---|---|---|---|---|
| Cal Poly Pomona | | – | | 7 | – | 1 | – | 1 |
| Montana State | | – | | 8 | – | 2 | – | 0 |
| Hawaii | | – | | 4 | – | 4 | – | 1 |
| Pepperdine | | – | | 3 | – | 6 | – | 0 |
| La Verne | | – | | 3 | – | 7 | – | 1 |
| UC Riverside | | – | | 1 | – | 4 | – | 1 |

The 1957 Cal Poly Pomona Broncos football team represented the Cal Poly Kellogg-Voorhis Unit—now known as California State Polytechnic University, Pomona—as an independent during the 1957 college football season. Led by first-year head coach Don Warhurst, Cal Poly Pomona compiled a record of 7–1–1. The team outscored its opponents 254 to 139 for the season. The Broncos played home games in Pomona, California.

== Schedule ==
| Date | Opponent | Site | Result | Attendance | Source |
|---|---|---|---|---|---|
| September 21 | vs. Mexico Poly | El Centro High School; El Centro, CA | T 21–21 | 4,000 | |
| September 28 | Barstow Marines | Barstow, CA | W 24–20 | | |
| October 5 | at Arizona State–Flagstaff | Skidmore Stadium; Flagstaff, AZ | L 7–34 | | |
| October 11 | at Occidental | D. W. Patterson Field; Los Angeles, CA | W 20–14 | | |
| October 19 | San Diego Marines (Note: The Marine Corps Recruit Depot (MCRD) in San Diego fielded a team that played against colleges and other military teams from 1922 to 1964.) | ? | W 45–6 | | |
| October 26 | Caltech | Pomona, CA | W 24–7 | | |
| November 2 | at Pomona | Claremont, CA | W 47–7 | | |
| November 9 | at La Verne | Bonita High School?; La Verne, CA | W 46–14 | | |
| November 16 | at Whittier | Hadley Field; Whittier, CA | W 20–16 | | |
