= 1957 Pepperdine Waves football team =

American college football season

1957 Pepperdine Waves football
- Conference: Independent
- Record: 3–6
- Head coach: John Scolinos (3rd season)
- Home stadium: El Camino Stadium

1957 Western non-major college football independents records
	Conf.			Overall
Team	W	L	T	W		L		T
Cal Poly Pomona		–		7	–	1	–	1
Montana State		–		8	–	2	–	0
Hawaii		–		4	–	4	–	1
Pepperdine		–		3	–	6	–	0
La Verne		–		3	–	7	–	1
UC Riverside		–		1	–	4	–	1

The 1957 Pepperdine Waves football team represented George Pepperdine College (Note: Pepperdine University was known as George Pepperdine College from 1937 to 1970.) as an independent during the 1957 college football season. The team was led by third-year head coach John Scolinos and played home games at El Camino Stadium on the campus of El Camino College in Torrance, California. They finished the season with a record of three 3–6.

== Schedule ==
Date	Opponent	Site	Result	Attendance	Source
September 20	Nevada	El Camino Stadium; Torrance, CA	W 24–12		
September 28	at Chico State	College Field; Chico, CA	L 13–19		
October 5	at Los Angeles State	Snyder Field; Los Angeles, CA ("Old Shoe" rivalry)	W 19–18		
October 12	at Cal Poly	Mustang Stadium; San Luis Obispo, CA	L 18–32		
October 19	Redlands	El Camino Stadium; Torrance, CA	L 7–20		
October 26	Long Beach State	El Camino Stadium; Torrance, CA	L 0–21		
November 9	at UC Santa Barbara	La Playa Stadium; Santa Barbara, CA	L 14–32	8,500	
November 15	San Diego State	El Camino Stadium; Torrance, CA	W 14–12		
November 22	San Diego	El Camino Stadium; Torrance, CA	L 0–27		
