= 1957 Montana State Bobcats football team =

American college football season

1957 Montana State Bobcats football
- Conference: Independent
- Record: 8–2
- Head coach: Tony Storti (5th season)
- Home stadium: Gatton Field

1957 Western non-major college football independents records
	Conf.			Overall
Team	W	L	T	W		L		T
Cal Poly Pomona		–		7	–	1	–	1
Montana State		–		8	–	2	–	0
Hawaii		–		4	–	4	–	1
Pepperdine		–		3	–	6	–	0
La Verne		–		3	–	7	–	1
UC Riverside		–		1	–	4	–	1

The 1957 Montana State Bobcats football team was an American football team that represented Montana State University as an independent during the 1957 college football season. In its fifth and final season under head coach Tony Storti, the team compiled an 8–2 record. The team won 16 games without a loss during the 1956 and 1957 seasons before losing to Idaho State on October 19.

== Schedule ==
Date	Opponent	Site	Result	Attendance	Source
September 14	at South Dakota State	State Field; Brookings, SD	W 13–6	6,000	
September 21	at Fresno State	Ratcliffe Stadium; Fresno, CA	W 27–14	9,598	
September 28	vs. Central Washington	Memorial Stadium; Great Falls, MT	W 13–7	5,000	
October 5	San Diego	Gatton Field; Bozeman, MT	W 21–7		
October 12	North Dakota State^{†}	Gatton Field; Bozeman, MT	W 27–6	6,000	
October 19	at Idaho State	Spud Bowl; Pocatello, ID	L 13–26	5,000	
October 26	at Omaha	Omaha, NE	W 35–0		
November 2	North Dakota	Gatton Field; Bozeman, MT	W 18–7	1,400	
November 9	Montana	Gatton Field; Bozeman, MT (rivalry)	W 22–13		
November 16	at Arizona State	Goodwin Stadium; Tempe, AZ	L 13–53	17,000	
^{†}Homecoming
