= 1957 South Dakota State Jackrabbits football team =

American college football season

1957 South Dakota State Jackrabbits football

NCC champion
- Conference: North Central Conference
- Record: 6–2–1 (5–0–1 NCC)
- Head coach: Ralph Ginn (11th season)
- Captains: Len Spanjers; Wayne Haensel
- Home stadium: State Field

1957 North Central Conference football standings
	Conf.					Overall
Team	W		L		T	W		L		T
South Dakota State $	5	–	0	–	1	6	–	2	–	1
Morningside	4	–	1	–	1	6	–	2	–	1
Iowa State Teachers	4	–	2	–	0	5	–	3	–	0
South Dakota	3	–	2	–	1	4	–	4	–	1
North Dakota State	2	–	3	–	1	3	–	4	–	1
Augustana (SD)	0	–	5	–	0	0	–	7	–	0
North Dakota	0	–	5	–	0	0	–	8	–	0
$ – Conference champion

The 1957 South Dakota State Jackrabbits football team was an American football team that represented South Dakota State University in the North Central Conference (NCC) during the 1957 college football season. In its 11th season under head coach Ralph Ginn, the team compiled a 6–2–1 record, won the NCC championship, and outscored opponents by a total of 185 to 119.

The team's statistical leaders included Jim Vacura with 455 rushing yards and Ron LaVallee with 603 passing yards. Guard Len Spanjers was selected as the NCC's Most Valuable Player. Other key players included end Ellis Jenson, tackle Wayne Haensel, and backs Al Breske and Ron LaVallee.

== Schedule ==
Date	Opponent	Site	Result	Attendance	Source
September 14	Montana State*	State Field; Brookings, SD	L 6–13		
September 21	Iowa State Teachers	State Field; Brookings, SD	W 23–20		
September 28	Drake*	Drake Stadium; Des Moines, IA	L 7–25		
October 5	Augustana (SD)	Howard Wood Stadium; Sioux Falls, SD	W 16–0		
October 12	North Dakota	Grand Forks, ND	W 53–21	5,000	
October 19	South Dakota	State Field; Brookings, SD (rivalry)	W 21–13		
October 26	North Dakota State	State Field; Brookings, SD (rivalry)	W 32–14		
November 2	at Morningside	Sioux City, IA	T 7–7		
November 9	at Mankato State*	Mankato, MN	W 20–6		
*Non-conference game
