= 1957 Hawaii Rainbows football team =

American college football season

1957 Hawaii Rainbows football
- Conference: Independent
- Record: 4–4–1
- Head coach: Hank Vasconcellos (6th season)
- Home stadium: Honolulu Stadium

1957 Western non-major college football independents records
	Conf.			Overall
Team	W	L	T	W		L		T
Cal Poly Pomona		–		7	–	1	–	1
Montana State		–		8	–	2	–	0
Hawaii		–		4	–	4	–	1
Pepperdine		–		3	–	6	–	0
La Verne		–		3	–	7	–	1
UC Riverside		–		1	–	4	–	1

The 1957 Hawaii Rainbows football team represented the University of Hawaiʻi at Mānoa as an independent during the 1957 college football season. In their sixth season under head coach Hank Vasconcellos, the Rainbows compiled a 4–4–1 record.

== Schedule ==
Date	Opponent	Site	Result	Attendance	Source
September 14	at Utah State	Romney Stadium; Logan, UT	L 12–26	3,800–5,000	
September 21	at Lewis & Clark	Griswold Stadium; Portland, OR	W 40–6		
September 28	at Humboldt State	Redwood Bowl; Arcata, CA	W 26–0	5,000	
October 11	Willamette	Honolulu Stadium; Honolulu, Territory of Hawaii	W 27–0	11,000	
October 27	Naval Station Pearl Harbor	Honolulu Stadium; Honolulu, Territory of Hawaii	W 26–7		
November 3	Hawaii Marines	Honolulu Stadium; Honolulu, Territory of Hawaii	T 7–7	9,000	
November 11	Hawaii Rams	Honolulu Stadium; Honolulu, Territory of Hawaii	L 6–7	5,000	
November 22	Fresno State^{†}	Honolulu Stadium; Honolulu, Territory of Hawaii (rivalry)	L 8–31	9,000	
November 30	San Jose State	Honolulu Stadium; Honolulu, Territory of Hawaii (rivalry)	L 0–12	13,000	
^{†}Homecoming
