= 1957 Buffalo Bulls football team =

American college football season

1957 Buffalo Bulls football
- Conference: Independent
- Record: 5–4
- Head coach: Dick Offenhamer (3rd season)
- Captain: Remo Damiani
- Home stadium: Rotary Field

1957 Eastern non-major college football independents records
	Conf.			Overall
Team	W	L	T	W		L		T
Juniata		–		7	–	0	–	0
Hobart		–		6	–	0	–	0
Hofstra		–		9	–	1	–	0
Carnegie Tech		–		4	–	2	–	1
Franklin & Marshall		–		4	–	2	–	1
Buffalo		–		5	–	4	–	0
Bucknell		–		3	–	6	–	0
Washington & Jefferson		–		1	–	6	–	1
Drexel		–		1	–	7	–	0
Temple		–		1	–	7	–	0

The 1957 Buffalo Bulls football team was an American football team that represented the University of Buffalo as an independent during the 1957 college football season. In their third season under head coach Dick Offenhamer, the Bulls compiled a 5–4 record. The team played its home games at Rotary Field in Buffalo, New York.

== Schedule ==
Date	Opponent	Site	Result	Attendance	Source
September 28	at Carnegie Tech	Pittsburgh, PA	W 14–9		
October 5	Lafayette	Rotary Field; Buffalo, NY	L 6–13		
October 12	Western Reserve	Rotary Field; Buffalo, NY	L 6–13		
October 19	at St. Lawrence	Canton, New York	W 14–6		
October 26	at Alfred	Alfred, NY	W 15–0		
November 2	Wayne State (MI)	Rotary Field; Buffalo, NY	W 33–7		
November 9	Cortland	Rotary Field; Buffalo, NY	L 0–20		
November 16	Lehigh	Rotary Field; Buffalo, NY	L 7–27	8,500	
November 23	at Temple	Temple Stadium; Philadelphia, PA	W 13–6		

== After the season ==
=== NFL draft ===
The following Bull was selected in the 1958 NFL draft following the season.

Round	Pick	Player	Position	NFL club
4	44	Frank Woidzik	Tackle	Los Angeles Rams
