= 1957 North Dakota State Bison football team =

American college football season

1957 North Dakota State Bison football
- Conference: North Central Conference
- Record: 0–8 (0–5 NCC)
- Head coach: Bob Danielson (1st season)
- Home stadium: Dacotah Field

1957 North Central Conference football standings
	Conf.					Overall
Team	W		L		T	W		L		T
South Dakota State $	5	–	0	–	1	6	–	2	–	1
Morningside	4	–	1	–	1	6	–	2	–	1
Iowa State Teachers	4	–	2	–	0	5	–	3	–	0
South Dakota	3	–	2	–	1	4	–	4	–	1
North Dakota State	2	–	3	–	1	3	–	4	–	1
Augustana (SD)	0	–	5	–	0	0	–	7	–	0
North Dakota	0	–	5	–	0	0	–	8	–	0
$ – Conference champion

The 1957 North Dakota State Bison football team was an American football team that represented North Dakota State University during the 1957 college football season as a member of the North Central Conference. In their first year under head coach Bob Danielson, the team compiled a 0–8 record.

== Schedule ==
Date	Opponent	Site	Result	Attendance	Source
September 14	Concordia–Moorhead*	Dacotah Field; Fargo, ND	L 0–47		
September 21	South Dakota	Dacotah Field; Fargo, ND	L 0–6	2,500	
September 28	Iowa State Teachers	Dacotah Field; Fargo, ND	L 0–18		
October 5	at Morningside	Public School Stadium; Sioux City, IA	L 6–13		
October 12	at Montana State*	Gatton Field; Bozeman, MT	L 6–27	6,000	
October 19	North Dakota^{†}	Dacotah Field; Fargo, ND (Nickel Trophy)	L 0–9		
October 26	at South Dakota State	State Field; Brookings, SD (rivalry)	L 14–32		
November 9	at Dayton*	UD Stadium; Dayton, OH	L 6–40	8,500	
*Non-conference game; ^{†}Homecoming
