= 1957 North Dakota Fighting Sioux football team =

American college football season

1957 North Dakota Fighting Sioux football
- Conference: North Central Conference
- Record: 3–4–1 (2–3–1 NCC)
- Head coach: Marvin C. Helling (1st season)
- Home stadium: Memorial Stadium

1957 North Central Conference football standings
| | Conf. | | | | | Overall |
| Team | W | | L | | T | W | | L | | T |
|---|---|---|---|---|---|---|---|---|---|---|
| South Dakota State $ | 5 | – | 0 | – | 1 | 6 | – | 2 | – | 1 |
| Morningside | 4 | – | 1 | – | 1 | 6 | – | 2 | – | 1 |
| Iowa State Teachers | 4 | – | 2 | – | 0 | 5 | – | 3 | – | 0 |
| South Dakota | 3 | – | 2 | – | 1 | 4 | – | 4 | – | 1 |
| North Dakota State | 2 | – | 3 | – | 1 | 3 | – | 4 | – | 1 |
| Augustana (SD) | 0 | – | 5 | – | 0 | 0 | – | 7 | – | 0 |
| North Dakota | 0 | – | 5 | – | 0 | 0 | – | 8 | – | 0 |
$ – Conference champion

The 1957 North Dakota Fighting Sioux football team, also known as the Nodaks, was an American football team that represented the University of North Dakota in the North Central Conference (NCC) during the 1957 college football season. In its first year under head coach Marvin C. Helling, the team compiled a 3–4–1 record (2–3–1 against NCC opponents), finished in sixth place out of seven teams in the NCC, and was outscored by a total of 198 to 159. The team played its home games at Memorial Stadium in Grand Forks, North Dakota.

== Schedule ==
| Date | Opponent | Site | Result | Attendance | Source |
|---|---|---|---|---|---|
| September 14 | Bemidji State* | Memorial Stadium; Grand Forks, ND | W 34–19 | | |
| September 20 | Augustana (SD) | Memorial Stadium; Grand Forks, ND | W 21–6 | | |
| September 28 | Morningside | Memorial Stadium; Grand Forks, ND | L 20–48 | 6,000 | |
| October 5 | at South Dakota | Inman Field; Vermillion, SD | T 27–27 | | |
| October 12 | South Dakota State^{†} | Memorial Stadium; Grand Forks, ND | L 21–53 | 5,000 | |
| October 19 | at North Dakota State | Dacotah Field; Fargo, ND (Hobo Day, rivalry) | W 9–0 | | |
| October 26 | at Iowa State Teachers | O. R. Latham Stadium; Cedar Falls, IA | L 20–27 | 2,900 | |
| November 2 | at Montana State* | Gatton Field; Bozeman, MT | L 7–18 | 1,400 | |
*Non-conference game; ^{†}Homecoming
