= 1957 Bucknell Bison football team =

American college football season

1957 Bucknell Bison football
- Conference: Independent
- Record: 3–6
- Head coach: Harry Lawrence (12th season)
- Captains: Bob Fitzsimmons; Rogers Frassenei
- Home stadium: Memorial Stadium

1957 Eastern non-major college football independents records
	Conf.			Overall
Team	W	L	T	W		L		T
Juniata		–		7	–	0	–	0
Hobart		–		6	–	0	–	0
Hofstra		–		9	–	1	–	0
Carnegie Tech		–		4	–	2	–	1
Franklin & Marshall		–		4	–	2	–	1
Buffalo		–		5	–	4	–	0
Bucknell		–		3	–	6	–	0
Washington & Jefferson		–		1	–	6	–	1
Drexel		–		1	–	7	–	0
Temple		–		1	–	7	–	0

The 1957 Bucknell Bison football team was an American football team that represented Bucknell University as an independent during the 1957 college football season.

In its 12th season under head coach Harry Lawrence, the team compiled a 3–6 record. Bob Fitzsimmons and Rogers Frassenei were the team captains.

The team played its home games at Memorial Stadium on the university campus in Lewisburg, Pennsylvania.

== Schedule ==
Date	Opponent	Site	Result	Attendance	Source
September 21	Albright	Memorial Stadium; Lewisburg, PA	W 16–0	4,000	
September 28	vs. Gettysburg	Hershey Stadium; Hershey, PA (Rotary Bowl)	L 0–19	10,000	
October 5	Temple	Memorial Stadium; Lewisburg, PA	W 19–6	5,000	
October 12	at Carnegie Tech	Forbes Field; Pittsburgh, PA	W 13–7		
October 19	Boston University^{†}	Memorial Stadium; Lewisburg, PA	L 0–28	6,500	
October 26	at Lafayette	Fisher Field; Easton, PA	L 13–35	7,000	
November 2	at Lehigh	Taylor Stadium; Bethlehem, PA	L 0–27	5,000	
November 9	at Colgate	Colgate Athletic Field; Hamilton, NY	L 0–32		
November 16	Delaware	Memorial Stadium; Lewisburg, PA	L 13–34	4,000	
^{†}Homecoming
