= 1957 West Chester Golden Rams football team =

American college football season

1957 West Chester Golden Rams football
- Conference: Pennsylvania State Teachers College Conference
- Record: 8–0 (4–0 PSTCC)
- Head coach: Glenn Killinger (20th season)
- Captains: George Demko; Bob Mosteller
- Home stadium: Wayne Field

1957 Pennsylvania State Teachers College Conference football standings
	Conf.					Overall
Team	W		L		T	W		L		T
Lock Haven +	5	–	0	–	0	8	–	0	–	0
Shippensburg +	5	–	0	–	0	6	–	0	–	1
West Chester	4	–	0	–	0	9	–	0	–	0
Edinboro	2	–	1	–	0	3	–	4	–	0
Slippery Rock	2	–	1	–	0	5	–	2	–	0
Kutztown	2	–	1	–	1	3	–	4	–	1
Bloomsburg	2	–	3	–	0	5	–	2	–	1
East Stroudsburg	2	–	3	–	1	3	–	4	–	1
Indiana (PA)	2	–	2	–	0	3	–	6	–	0
Mansfield	1	–	2	–	0	3	–	3	–	0
California (PA)	1	–	4	–	0	2	–	5	–	0
Millersville	1	–	5	–	0	2	–	6	–	0
Clarion	1	–	4	–	0	2	–	6	–	0
Cheyney	0	–	4	–	0	0	–	6	–	0
+ – Conference co-champions; Conference standings were based on the Saylor system of ratings.

The 1957 West Chester Golden Rams football team was an American football team that represented West Chester State College (now known as West Chester University) as a member of the Pennsylvania State Teachers College Conference (PSTCC) during the 1957 college football season. In their 20th year under head coach Glenn Killinger, the Golden Rams compiled a perfect 8–0 record (4–0 against PSTCC opponents) and outscored opponents by a total of 326 to 40. Despite a 14-game winning streak dating back to 1956, West Chester lost the PSTCC title to Shippensburg and Lock Haven due to the conference's point system that rated the relative strength of each team's opponents.

The 1957 season was one of five perfect seasons in West Chester Rams football history, the others being 1923, 1928, 1952, and 1960.

The team played its home game at Wayne Field in West Chester, Pennsylvania.

== Schedule ==
Date	Opponent	Site	Result	Attendance	Source
September 21	at Fort Myer*	Arlington, VA	W 25–7		
September 27	King's (PA)*	Wayne Field; West Chester, PA	W 52–12	4,000	
October 5	New Haven*	Wayne Field; West Chester, PA	W 47–7		
October 12	at Baldwin-Wallace*	Berea, OH	W 39–7		
October 18	Drexel*	Wayne Field; West Chester, PA	W 39–0		
October 26	at East Stroudsburg	East Stroudsburg, PA	W 34–0	4,000	
November 1	Millersville	Wayne Field; West Chester, PA	W 25–0		
November 9	at Bloomsburg	Bloomsburg, PA	W 13–7	2,000	
November 16	California (PA)	Wayne Field; West Chester, PA	W 52–0		
*Non-conference game

== Awards and statistical leaders ==
Three West Chester players were selected by the conference coaches as first-team players on the PSTCC all-star team: fullback Bob Mosteller; end Bruce Shenk; and tackle Dick Emerich.

Halfback Jack Wendland led the team with 537 rushing yards. He also set a school record with an average of 7.3 yards per rushing attempt.He broke his own record in 1958 with an average of 9.0 yards per carry.

Quarterback John Harrington led the team in passing. He completed 38 of 86 passes for 742 yards and 16 touchdowns. End Bruce Shenk was the team's leading receiver. He caught 14 passes for 327 yards (23.4 yards per reception) and seven touchdowns. Rob Mosteller led the team in scoring with 67 points on eight touchdowns and 19 extra points.

== Players ==
- Ken Alston, end
- Charley Chiccino
- John Harrington, quarterback
- Rob Mosteller, back and co-captain
- Tom Nolen, halfback
- Bruce Shenk, end
- Bill Shockley, fullback
- Jack Wendland, halfback
- Dick Yoder, quarterback
