= 1957 Lafayette Leopards football team =

American college football season

1957 Lafayette Leopards football
- Conference: Middle Three Conference
- Record: 4–4 (0–2 Middle Three)
- Head coach: Steve Hokuf (6th season)
- Captains: Joseph Bozik; William Harrick
- Home stadium: Fisher Field

1957 Middle Three Conference football standings
	Conf.					Overall
Team	W		L		T	W		L		T
Lehigh $	2	–	0	–	0	8	–	1	–	0
Rutgers	1	–	1	–	0	5	–	4	–	0
Lafayette	0	–	2	–	0	4	–	4	–	0
$ – Conference champion

The 1957 Lafayette Leopards football team was an American football team that represented Lafayette College during the 1957 college football season. Lafayette finished last in the Middle Three Conference. In their sixth and final year under head coach Steve Hokuf, the Leopards compiled a 4–4 record, but lost both games to their conference opponents. William Harrick and Joseph Bozik were the team captains.

Like many college campuses, Lafayette was hit hard by an outbreak of Asian flu in October. The Leopards won their Oct. 5 game against Buffalo despite having nine players, including seven starters, confined to bed. The list of influenza patients grew to greater than 20 over the following week, prompting the college to cancel a scheduled Oct. 12 matchup with Delaware.

Lafayette played home games at Fisher Field on College Hill in Easton, Pennsylvania.

== Schedule ==
Date	Opponent	Site	Result	Attendance	Source
September 28	Muhlenberg*	Fisher Field; Easton, PA	W 20–13	6,000	
October 5	at Buffalo*	Rotary Field; Buffalo, NY	W 14–6		
October 12	Delaware*	Fisher Field; Easton, PA	canceled		
October 19	at Temple	Temple Stadium; Philadelphia, PA	L 12–13	5,000	
October 26	Bucknell*	Fisher Field; Easton, PA	W 35–13	7,000	
November 2	at Gettysburg*	Musselman Stadium; Gettysburg, PA	L 20–46	4,000	
November 9	Rutgers	Fisher Field; Easton, PA	L 19–34	8,000	
November 16	Western Maryland*	Fisher Field; Easton, PA	W 40–13		
November 23	at Lehigh	Taylor Stadium; Bethlehem, PA (The Rivalry)	L 13–26	17,000	
*Non-conference game
