= 1957 Ripon Redmen football team =

American college football season

1957 Ripon Redmen football
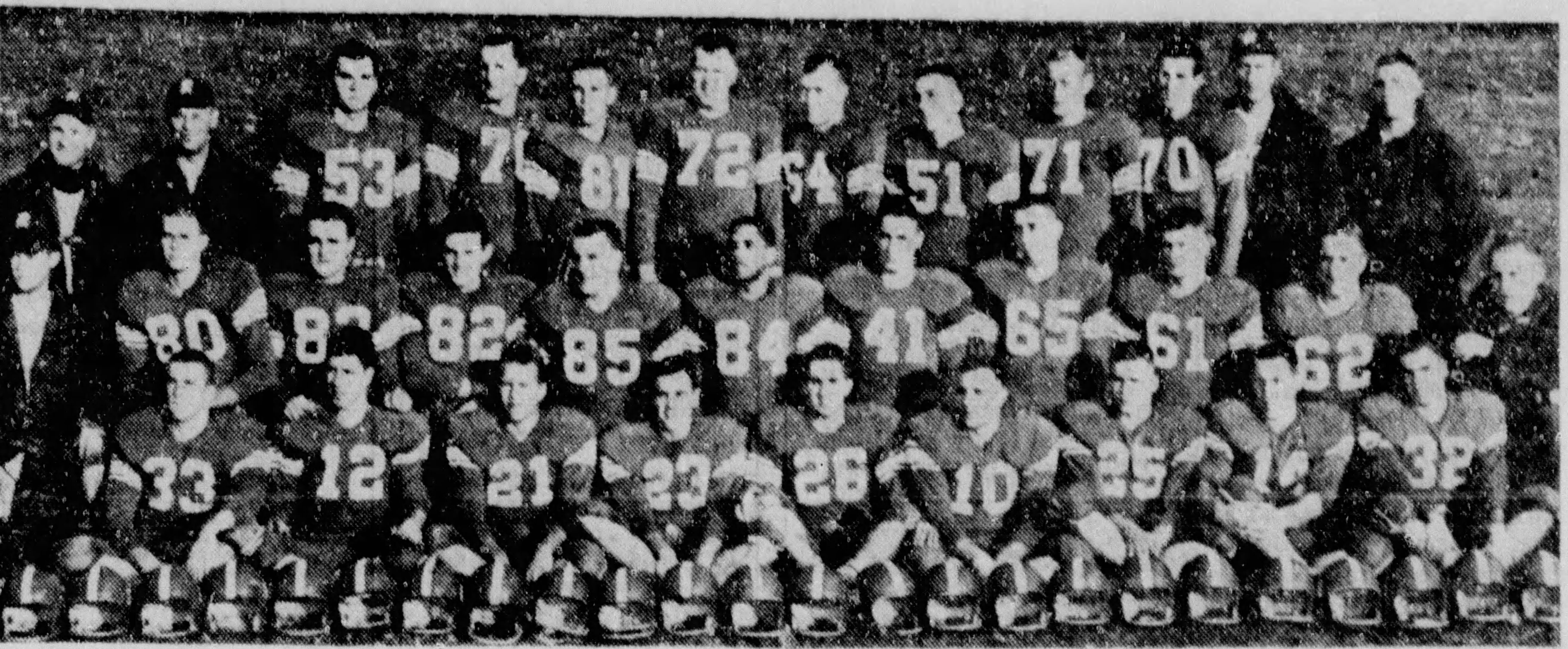

MWC champion
- Conference: Midwest Conference
- Record: 8–0 (8–0 MWC)
- Head coach: Jerry Thompson (2nd season)
- Home stadium: Ingall Field

1957 Midwest Conference football standings
	Conf.					Overall
Team	W		L		T	W		L		T
Ripon $	8	–	0	–	0	8	–	0	–	0
Carleton	6	–	1	–	1	6	–	1	–	1
Coe	6	–	2	–	0	6	–	2	–	0
Cornell (IA)	3	–	3	–	2	3	–	3	–	2
Grinnell	3	–	3	–	2	3	–	3	–	2
St. Olaf	4	–	4	–	0	4	–	4	–	0
Knox	1	–	6	–	1	1	–	6	–	1
Lawrence	1	–	7	–	0	1	–	7	–	0
Monmouth (IL)	1	–	7	–	0	1	–	7	–	0
$ – Conference champion

The 1957 Ripon Redmen football team was an American football team that represented Ripon College as a member of the Midwest Conference (MWC) during the 1957 college football season. In their second and final year under head coach John Storzer, the Redmen compiled a perfect 8–0 record (8–0 in conference games), won the MWC championship, and outscored all opponents by a total of 270 to 77.

Ripon halfback Dick Celichowski led the MWC with 72 points scored on 12 touchdowns. Fullback Dave Smith added 54 points on nine touchdowns. Quarterback Pete Mattiacci ranked third for Ripon with 36 points on six touchdowns.

End Peter Kassson was selected as a first-team players on the 1957 Little All-America college football team. Six Ripon players were named to the 1957 MWC all-league team: Kasson; fullback Dave Smith; halfback Dick Celichowski; quarterback Pete Mattiacii; center Tom Cooley; and tackle Ted Peterson.

Several days after the season ended, Jerry Thompson resigned as Ripon's head coach in order to enroll in a seminary to become a Lutheran minister. Despite having the smallest roster in the conference, Thompson emphasized teamwork and inspired his players with prayer before each game, asking not for victory, but "only that they may may behave as gentlemen and that they may be able to give their utmost in playing the game"

The team played its home games at Ingall Field (sometimes referred to as Ingall's Field) in Ripon, Wisconsin.

== Schedule ==
Date	Opponent	Site	Result	Source
September 21	Monmouth (IL)	Ingall Field; Ripon, WI	W 34–0	
September 28	at St. Olaf	Northfield, MN	W 31–26	
October 5	Coe	Ingall Field; Ripon, WI	W 7–6	
October 12	at Grinnell	Grinnell, IA	W 40–13	
October 19	at Lawrence^{†}	Appleton, WI (rivalry)	W 28–7	
November 2	at Carleton	Northfield, MN	W 40–19	
November 9	Cornell (IA)	Ingall Field; Ripon, WI	W 42–6	
November 16	at Knox	Galesburg, IL	W 48–0	
^{†}Homecoming
