= 1957 Hobart Statesmen football team =

American college football team

1957 Hobart Statesmen football
- Conference: Independent
- Record: 6–0
- Head coach: Eddie Tryon (12th season)
- Captain: Ernie Lisi
- Home stadium: Boswell Field

1957 Eastern non-major college football independents records
	Conf.			Overall
Team	W	L	T	W		L		T
Juniata		–		7	–	0	–	0
Hobart		–		6	–	0	–	0
Hofstra		–		9	–	1	–	0
Carnegie Tech		–		4	–	2	–	1
Franklin & Marshall		–		4	–	2	–	1
Buffalo		–		5	–	4	–	0
Bucknell		–		3	–	6	–	0
Washington & Jefferson		–		1	–	6	–	1
Drexel		–		1	–	7	–	0
Temple		–		1	–	7	–	0

The 1957 Hobart Statesmen football team was an American football team that represented Hobart College as an independent during the 1957 college football season. In their 12th year under head coach Eddie Tryon, the Statesmen compiled a 6–0 record and outscored opponents by a total of 141 to 50. It was the second perfect season in the 63-year history of the Hobart football program.

Art Lambert was the team's quarterback. He led the team in passing and also led in interceptions while playing on defense. Labert received honorable mention on the 1957 All-Eastern football team.

The team played its home games at Boswell Field in Geneva, New York.

== Schedule ==
Date	Opponent	Site	Result	Attendance	Source
September 28	Allegheny	Boswell Field; Geneva, NY	W 26–7		
October 5	at Rochester	Fauver Stadium; Rochester, NY	W 27–20	6,000	
October 12	at Thiel	Greenville, PA	W 21–14		
October 19	Alfred	Boswell Field; Geneva, NY	Canceled (flu outbreak)		
October 26	at Union (NY)	Schenectady, NY	Canceled (flu outbreak)		
November 2	St. Lawrence	Boswell Field; Geneva, NY	W 40–7		
November 9	at Hamilton	Clinton, NY	W 8–2		
November 16	Upsala	Boswell Field; Geneva, NY	W 19–0		
