= 1957 UC Riverside Highlanders football team =

American college football season

1957 UC Riverside Highlanders football
- Conference: Independent
- Record: 1–4–1
- Head coach: Carl Selin (2nd season)
- Home stadium: UCR Athletic Field

1957 Western non-major college football independents records
	Conf.			Overall
Team	W	L	T	W		L		T
Cal Poly Pomona		–		7	–	1	–	1
Montana State		–		8	–	2	–	0
Hawaii		–		4	–	4	–	1
Pepperdine		–		3	–	6	–	0
La Verne		–		3	–	7	–	1
UC Riverside		–		1	–	4	–	1

The 1957 UC Riverside Highlanders football team represented the University of California, Riverside as an independent during the 1957 college football season. Led by second-year head coach Carl Selin, UC Riverside compiled a record of 1–4–1. The team was outscored by its opponents 157 to 63 for the season. The Highlanders played home games at UCR Athletic Field in Riverside, California.

== Schedule ==
Date	Opponent	Site	Result
September 28	California Baptist	UCR Athletic Field; Riverside, CA	W 31–0
October 5	at Caltech	Rose Bowl; Pasadena, CA	L 7–41
October 12	Cal Western^{†}	UCR Athletic Field; Riverside, CA	L 19–21
October 26	at Westminster (UT)	Salt Lake City, UT	L 0–62
November 2	La Verne	UCR Athletic Field; Riverside, CA	L 0–27
November 9	Chino Institute	Chino, CA	T 6–6
^{†}Homecoming

(Note: cfbdatawarehouse.com incorrectly lists two additional 1957 games, against Antelope Valley College and Cerritos College. These were played by Riverside Junior College, not UC Riverside, and are therefore not included here.)
