= 1957 Temple Owls football team =

American college football season

1957 Temple Owls football
- Conference: Independent
- Record: 1–6
- Head coach: Peter P. Stevens (2nd season)
- Captain: Game captains
- Home stadium: Temple Stadium

1957 Eastern non-major college football independents records
| | Conf. | | | Overall |
| Team | W | L | T | W | | L | | T |
|---|---|---|---|---|---|---|---|---|
| Juniata | | – | | 7 | – | 0 | – | 0 |
| Hobart | | – | | 6 | – | 0 | – | 0 |
| Hofstra | | – | | 9 | – | 1 | – | 0 |
| Carnegie Tech | | – | | 4 | – | 2 | – | 1 |
| Franklin & Marshall | | – | | 4 | – | 2 | – | 1 |
| Buffalo | | – | | 5 | – | 4 | – | 0 |
| Bucknell | | – | | 3 | – | 6 | – | 0 |
| Washington & Jefferson | | – | | 1 | – | 6 | – | 1 |
| Drexel | | – | | 1 | – | 7 | – | 0 |
| Temple | | – | | 1 | – | 7 | – | 0 |

The 1957 Temple Owls football team was an American football team that represented Temple University as an independent during the 1957 college football season. In its second season under head coach Peter P. Stevens, the team compiled a 1–6 record. The team played its home games at Temple Stadium in Philadelphia.

Temple did not play its scheduled date with the University of Scranton on Oct. 26, as an outbreak of Asian flu affecting more than a dozen of the Royals' players prompted Scranton to cancel the game.

The Owls began a 21-game losing streak (the longest in school history) on November 2, 1957; they did not win another game until September 24, 1960. Stevens was assisted by Gavin White and John Rogers.

Lou Grandizio and Bill Medve were Freshman assistant coaches under Head Coach Roger White.

== Schedule ==
| Date | Opponent | Site | Result | Attendance | Source |
|---|---|---|---|---|---|
| October 5 | at Bucknell | Memorial Stadium; Lewisburg, PA | L 6–19 | 5,000 | |
| October 12 | at Hofstra | Hofstra College Stadium; Hempstead, NY | L 7–13 | 5,547 | |
| October 19 | Lafayette^{†} | Temple Stadium; Philadelphia, PA | W 13–12 | 5,000 | |
| October 26 | Scranton | Temple Stadium; Philadelphia, PA | Canceled | | |
| November 2 | Muhlenberg | Temple Stadium; Philadelphia, PA | L 16–40 | 2,000 | |
| November 9 | at Delaware | Delaware Stadium; Newark, DE | L 7–71 | 6,000 | |
| November 16 | at Gettysburg | Memorial Field; Gettysburg, PA | L 7–42 | 4,000 | |
| November 23 | Buffalo | Temple Stadium; Philadelphia, PA | L 6–13 | | |
^{†}Homecoming
