= Bill Austin (American football, born 1937) =

American football player

Rutgers Scarlet Knights
- Position: Fullback

Personal information
- Born: c. 1937
- Died: 2015 (aged 78)
- Listed height: 5 ft 11 in (1.80 m)
- Listed weight: 170 lb (77 kg)

Career information
- High school: Scotch Plains-Fanwood

Awards and highlights
- First-team All-American (1958); 2× First-team All-Eastern (1957, 1958)

Bill Austin (c. 1937 – 2015) was an American college football and college lacrosse player. He played as a back for the Rutgers Scarlet Knights football team from 1956 to 1958 and was selected by the Associated Press as a first-team player on the 1958 All-America Team. He finished sixth in the voting for the Heisman Trophy in 1958, and he rushed for 2,073 yards and scored 204 points during his college football career at Rutgers. Austin also played lacrosse at Rutgers, earning honorable mention All-American accolades in 1958 and 1959. He was selected by the Washington Redskins in the 28th round (329th overall) of the 1959 NFL draft.

A resident of Camarillo, California who spent most of his professional career as an executive of a number of bicycle manufacturers, Austin grew up in Fanwood, New Jersey and played football at Scotch Plains-Fanwood High School, graduating in 1955.
