= Bob Stransky =

American football player (born 1936)

No. 80, 22
- Positions: Halfback, safety

Personal information
- Born: June 30, 1936 (age 90); Yankton, South Dakota, U.S.
- Listed height: 6 ft 1 in (1.85 m)
- Listed weight: 180 lb (82 kg)

Career information
- High school: Yankton
- College: Colorado
- NFL draft: 1958: 2nd round, 24th overall pick

Career history
- Baltimore Colts (1958)*; Winnipeg Blue Bombers (1958); BC Lions (1959); Denver Broncos (1960)
- * Offseason or practice squad member only

Awards and highlights
- First-team All-American (1957); First-team All-Big Eight (1957); Second-team All-Big Seven (1956)

Career AFL statistics
- Rushing yards: 78
- Rushing average: 2.8
- Receptions: 3
- Receiving yards: 11
- Stats at Pro Football Reference

Robert J. Stransky (born January 30, 1936) is an American former professional football player. He grew up in Yankton, South Dakota, and attended the University of Colorado where he played college football at the tailback and safety positions for the Colorado Buffaloes football team from 1956 to 1957. He finished the 1957 season ranked second in the country with 1,097 rushing yards, and he was selected by the Football Writers Association of America and the International News Service as a first-team back on their respective 1957 College Football All-America Teams. He later played football in the Canadian Football League (CFL) as a halfback for the Winnipeg Blue Bombers (1958) and BC Lions (1959)., and in 1960 with the Denver Broncos of the American Football League. He was inducted into the University of Colorado Athletic Hall of Fame in 2010.
