= John Storzer =

American athlete, coach, and administrator (1920–1973)

Biographical details
- Born: May 31, 1920; Mountain, Wisconsin, U.S.
- Died: November 1, 1973 (aged 53); Ripon, Wisconsin, U.S.

Playing career

Football
- 1943: River Falls State
- 1946: River Falls State

Coaching career (HC unless noted)

Football
- 1947–1956: Pulaski HS (WI)
- 1957: Ripon (assistant)
- 1958–1973: Ripon

Baseball
- 1958–1971: Ripon
- 1973: Ripon

Administrative career (AD unless noted)
- 1968–1973: Ripon

Head coaching record
- Overall: 87–39–4 (college football); 133–76 (college baseball)

Accomplishments and honors

Championships
- Football; 5 MWC (1963–1966, 1968) Baseball; 5 MWC (1962–1963, 1965–1967)

John McClain Storzer (May 31, 1920 – November 1, 1973) was an American football and baseball player and coach and college athletics administrator. He served as the head football coach at Ripon College in Ripon, Wisconsin from 1958 to 1973, compiling a record of 87–39–43. Storzer was also the head baseball coach at Ripon from 1958 to 1971 and again in 1973, tallying a mark of 133–76.

Storzer died on November 1, 1973, at Ripon Memorial Hospital in Ripon, after suffering a heart attack.

== Head coaching record ==
=== College football ===
| Year | Team | Overall | Conference | Standing | Bowl/playoffs |
|---|---|---|---|---|---|
Ripon Redmen (Midwest Conference) (1958–1973)
| 1958 | Ripon | 6–2 | 6–2 | 3rd | |
| 1959 | Ripon | 4–4 | 4–4 | T–4th | |
| 1960 | Ripon | 3–4–1 | 3–4–1 | T–6th | |
| 1961 | Ripon | 4–3–1 | 4–3–1 | 5th | |
| 1962 | Ripon | 6–1–1 | 6–1–1 | 2nd | |
| 1963 | Ripon | 8–0 | 8–0 | 1st | |
| 1964 | Ripon | 7–1 | 7–1 | T–1st | |
| 1965 | Ripon | 7–1 | 7–1 | 1st | |
| 1966 | Ripon | 7–1 | 7–1 | T–1st | |
| 1967 | Ripon | 4–4 | 4–4 | T–4th | |
| 1968 | Ripon | 7–1 | 7–1 | 1st | |
| 1969 | Ripon | 4–5 | 4–5 | T–6th | |
| 1970 | Ripon | 6–3 | 5–3 | T–3rd | |
| 1971 | Ripon | 5–4 | 4–4 | T–5th | |
| 1972 | Ripon | 5–3 | 5–3 | T–3rd | |
| 1973 | Ripon | 4–2–1 (Note: Storzer coached the first seven games of the 1973 season before he died. Bill Connor was appointed acting head coach and Ripon for the final two games of the season. The Redmen finished 5–3–1 overall and 5–2–1 in Midwest Collegiate Athletic Conference play, tying for third place.) | 4–1–1 | | |
| Ripon: | | 87–39–4 | 85–38–4 | | |
| Total: | | 87–39–4 | | | |
National championship Conference title Conference division title or championship game berth
