= Stanley W. Jackson =

American psychiatrist and historian (1920–2000)

Stanley Webber Jackson (17 November 1920 – 24 May 2000) was a notable psychiatrist and Professor Emeritus of Psychiatry and History of Medicine at Yale University.

He wrote two titles: Melancholia and Depression: From Hippocratic Times to Modern Times (Yale University Press, 1986) and Care of the Psyche: A History of Psychological Healing (Yale University Press, 1999). Jackson died on 24 May 2000.
