= Brad Hustad =

American football fullback

- Brad Hustad, 1958

Profile
- Position: Fullback

Personal information
- Born: Mt. Horeb, Wisconsin, U.S.
- Listed weight: 190 lb (86 kg)

Career information
- College: LSU (1956, freshman team); Luther Norse (1957–1959)

Brad Hustad is an American former football fullback. He played college football at Luther College from 1957 to 1959. He led college football in 1957 with 1,401 rushing yards and set a college football record with 3,943 rushing yards.

== Early life ==
Hustad grew up in Mount Horeb, Wisconsin. He was a multi-sport athlete at Mount Horeb High School.

== Luther College ==
Hustad attended LSU for a semester but sustained a knee injury and transferred to Luther College in Iowa. He played for the Luther Norse football team from 1957 to 1959.

In 1957, Hustad led the country with 1,401 rushing yards on 219 carries, the third highest total in college football history. He was the first sophomore to lead the NCAA in rushing. He also tallied 72 points on 12 touchdowns in 1957.

As a junior in 1958, Hustad rushed for 1,354 yards on 206 carries. His rushing total ranked third in college football and led the nation's small colleges. At the end of the 1958 season, Hustad received first-team honors on the 1958 NAIA All-America football team.

As a senior in 1959, Hustad tallied 1,188 rushing yards. He concluded his college career with a national record 3,943 rushing yards. He won all-Iowa Conference honors in 1957, 1958, and 1959.

== Later life ==
After leaving Luther College, Hustad received a master's degree from the University of Wisconsin in 1952. He later worked as a teacher and coach at Kellogg High School in Minnesota. Hustad was inducted in 1974 into the Luther College Norse Hall of Fame.
