= Stan Jackson (quarterback) =

American football player

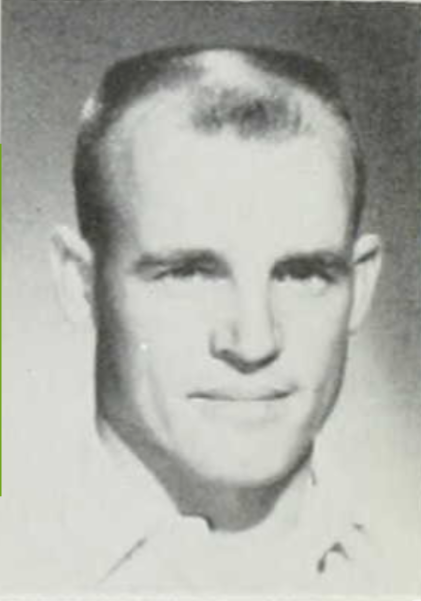
- Jackson from 1959 Cal Poly Pomona yearbook

Profile
- Position: Quarterback

Personal information
- Born: c. 1936 (age 89–90)

Career information
- College: Cal Poly Pomona (1957–1958)

Stan Jackson (born c. 1936) is an American former football quarterback.

He attended Imperial High School. He gained national fame in 1957 and 1958 as the quarterback of the Cal Poly Pomona Broncos football program. During his time at Cal Poly Pomona, he set several national records, including a single-game record of 434 passing yards and single-season record in passing yardage (1,994 yards) and total offense (2,478 yards). His two-year tally of 4,623 yards of total offense also established a national record. He was also the first player to tally over 2,000 yards in consecutive seasons. At the end of the 1958 season, he was selected as a first-team back on the All-NAIA team.
