= 1957 college football rankings =

- Season: 1957
- Bowl season: 1957–58 bowl games
- Preseason No. 1: Oklahoma
- End of season champions: Auburn (AP); Ohio State (UPI)

The 1957 college football rankings were an effort to rank the American football teams participating in the 1957 college football season. College football's governing body, the National Collegiate Athletic Association (NCAA), did not issue rankings or conduct a championship game or playoffs to determine a national champion. The most widely-reported rankings were published by two of the major news agencies based on weekly polling conducted during the season and at the end of the regular season.

- The Associated Press (AP) conducted a weekly poll of sports writers throughout the country. This was known as the AP poll or the "writers poll".
- The United Press (UP) conducted a weekly poll of the nation's head football coaches. This was known as the UP poll or the "coaches poll".

At the end of the regular season, Auburn was ranked No. 1 in the AP poll, and Ohio State was ranked No. 1 in the UP poll. Auburn did not play in a bowl game; Ohio State won the 1958 Rose Bowl. Neither agency conducted polling after the bowl games.

Additional rankings were published at the end of the season by the International News Service (INS), Football Writers Association of America (FWAA), and Litkenhous, each of which ranked Ohio State at No. 1.

== Legend ==
| | Increase in ranking |
| | Decrease in ranking |
| | Not ranked previous week |
| | National champion |
| (#–#) | Win–loss record |
| (Italics) | Number of first place votes |
| т | Tied with team above or below also with this symbol |

== AP poll ==
The final AP poll was released on December 2, at the end of the regular season, weeks before the major bowls. The AP did not conduct poll after the bowl season regularly until 1968.

| | Preseason Aug | Week 1 Sep 23 | Week 2 Sep 30 | Week 3 Oct 7 | Week 4 Oct 14 | Week 5 Oct 21 | Week 6 Oct 28 | Week 7 Nov 4 | Week 8 Nov 11 | Week 9 Nov 18 | Week 10 Nov 25 | Week 11 (Final) Dec 2 | |
|---|---|---|---|---|---|---|---|---|---|---|---|---|---|
| 1. | Oklahoma (127) | Oklahoma (1–0) (65) | Oklahoma (1–0) (81) | Oklahoma (2–0) (65) | Michigan State (3–0) (92) | Oklahoma (4–0) (89) | Texas A&M (6–0) (59) | Texas A&M (7–0) (65) | Texas A&M (8–0) (60) | Michigan State (7–1) (87) | Auburn (9–0) (85) | Auburn (10–0) (210) | 1. |
| 2. | Texas A&M (4) | Texas A&M (1–0) | Michigan State (1–0) (24) | Michigan State (2–0) (21) | Oklahoma (3–0) (64) | Texas A&M (5–0) (5) | Oklahoma (5–0) (51) | Oklahoma (6–0) (48) | Oklahoma (7–0) (46) | Auburn (8–0) (88) | Ohio State (8–1) (65) | Ohio State (8–1) (71) | 2. |
| 3. | Michigan State (20) | Georgia Tech (1–0) | Minnesota (1–0) (10) | Texas A&M (3–0) (3) | Texas A&M (4–0) (5) | Iowa (4–0) (16) | Iowa (5–0) (20) | Auburn (6–0) (50) | Auburn (7–0) (42) | Ohio State (7–1) (23) | Michigan State (8–1) (41) | Michigan State (8–1) (30) | 3. |
| 4. | Minnesota (9) | Michigan State (0–0) (4) | Duke (2–0) (8) | Minnesota (2–0) (5) | Minnesota (3–0) (6) | Duke (5–0) (10) | Auburn (5–0) (19) | Michigan State (5–1) (6) | Michigan State (6–1) (9) | Texas A&M (8–1) (2) | Texas A&M (8–1) (2) | Oklahoma (9–1) (22) | 4. |
| 5. | Tennessee (3) | Navy (1–0) (1) | Texas A&M (2–0) | Duke (3–0) (5) | Duke (4–0) (5) | Auburn (4–0) (11) | Notre Dame (4–0) (4) | Iowa (5–0–1) (12) | Iowa (6–0–1) (19) | Ole Miss (8–1) (5) | Oklahoma (8–1) (8) | Navy (8–1–1) (6) | 5. |
| 6. | Michigan (3) | Minnesota (0–0) (1) | Navy (2–0) (1) | Michigan (2–0) | Iowa (3–0) (10) | Ole Miss (5–0) (10) | Michigan State (4–1) (3) | Ohio State (5–1) (10) | Ohio State (6–1) (6) | Oklahoma (7–1) (4) | Iowa (7–1–1) (7) | Iowa (7–1–1) (7) | 6. |
| 7. | Baylor | Duke (1–0) (2) | Auburn (1–0) (6) | Oregon State (3–0) (2) | Oregon State (4–0) (1) | Notre Dame (3–0) (4) | Duke (5–0–1) (3) | Navy (6–1) | Tennessee (6–1) (1) | Navy (7–1–1) (1) | Ole Miss (8–1) (6) | Ole Miss (8–1–1) (3) | 7. |
| 8. | Pittsburgh | Tennessee (0–0) | Iowa (1–0) (3) | Iowa (2–0) (4) | Notre Dame (3–0) (3) | Michigan State (3–1) (1) | Ohio State (4–1) (1) | Army (5–1) | Ole Miss (7–1) (1) | Iowa (6–1–1) (2) | Navy (7–1–1) | Rice (7–3) | 8. |
| 9. | Iowa (4) | Oregon State (1–0) | Oregon State (2–0) | Auburn (2–0) (5) | Auburn (3–0) (6) | Army (3–1) | Army (4–1) | Tennessee (5–1) | Navy (6–1–1) | Notre Dame (5–2) (2) | Rice (6–3) | Texas A&M (8–2) | 9. |
| 10. | Duke | Michigan (0–0) | Michigan (1–0) | Army (2–0) | Arkansas (4–0) (5) | LSU (4–1) | NC State (4–0–2) | NC State (5–0–2) (3) | Army (6–1) | Army (7–1) | Army (7–1) | Notre Dame (6–3) | 10. |
| 11. | Georgia Tech | Baylor (1–0) | Baylor (2–0) (1) | Arkansas (3–0) | Ole Miss (4–0) (1) | NC State (4–0–1) | Arkansas (5–1) (5) | Michigan (4–1–1) | Duke (5–1–2) | Duke (6–1–2) (1) | Arizona State (9–0) (11) | Texas (6–3–1) | 11. |
| 12. | Navy | Iowa (0–0) (1) | Army (1–0) | Notre Dame (2–0) | NC State (4–0) | Ohio State (3–1) (1) | Michigan (4–1) | Arkansas (5–2) (1) | Mississippi State (5–2) | Tennessee (6–2) | Notre Dame (5–3) | Arizona State (10–0) (10) | 12. |
| 13. | Oregon State | Texas (1–0) | NC State (2–0) | NC State (3–0) | Wisconsin (3–0) | Rice (3–1) | Texas (4–2) | Oregon (6–1) | VMI (7–0–1) | Rice (5–3) | Mississippi State (6–2) | Tennessee (7–3) | 13. |
| 14. | Miami (FL) (1) | Houston (1–0) | Georgia Tech (1–0–1) | Ole Miss (3–0) | North Carolina (3–1) | Minnesota (3–1) | Ole Miss (5–1) | Ole Miss (6–1) (1) | Clemson (5–2) | Mississippi State (6–2) | Wisconsin (6–3) | Mississippi State (6–2–1) | 14. |
| 15. | Auburn | SMU (1–0) | Ole Miss (2–0) | Rice (2–0) | Navy (3–1) | UCLA (4–1) | Oregon (5–1) | Notre Dame (4–1) | Illinois (3–4) | Oregon (7–2) | NC State (7–1–2) | NC State (7–1–2) | 15. |
| 16. | Penn State | Pittsburgh (0–1) т | Notre Dame (1–0) | Wisconsin (2–0) | Pittsburgh (3–1) | Illinois (2–2) (1) т | Navy (5–1) (1) | Duke (5–1–1) | Oregon (6–2) | VMI (8–0–1) (1) | Duke (6–2–2) | Duke (6–2–2) | 16. |
| 17. | Ohio State (1) | Stanford (1–0) т | Stanford (2–0) | Georgia Tech (1–0–1) | LSU (3–1) | Navy (4–1) т | Tennessee (4–1) | Mississippi State (5–1) | TCU (4–2–1) | Arizona State (8–0) (3) | VMI (8–0–1) | Florida (6–2–1) | 17. |
| 18. | Notre Dame (2) | Rice (1–0) | TCU (1–0–1) | North Carolina (2–1) | Michigan (2–1) | Oregon (4–1) | Colorado (3–2–1) | Georgia Tech (3–2–1) | Michigan (4–2–1) | Wisconsin (5–3) | Tennessee (6–3) | Army (7–2) | 18. |
| 19. | USC | Ole Miss (1–0) т | UCLA (2–0) | Tennessee (1–1) | Army (2–1) т | Texas (3–2) | Florida (3–1) | Missouri (5–1–1) (1) | NC State (5–1–2) | Michigan (5–2–1) | Oregon State (8–2) | Wisconsin (6–3) | 19. |
| 20. | Kentucky | Penn State (0–0) т | Texas (2–0) | Pittsburgh (2–1) | Rice (2–1) т; Washington State (3–1) т | Michigan (3–1) | Dartmouth (5–0) | VMI (6–0–1) | Rice (4–3) | NC State (6–1–2) | Florida (5–2–1) | VMI (9–0–1) (1) | 20. |
| | Preseason Aug | Week 1 Sep 23 | Week 2 Sep 30 | Week 3 Oct 7 | Week 4 Oct 14 | Week 5 Oct 21 | Week 6 Oct 28 | Week 7 Nov 4 | Week 8 Nov 11 | Week 9 Nov 18 | Week 10 Nov 25 | Week 11 (Final) Dec 2 | |
| | | Dropped: Auburn; Kentucky; Miami (FL); Notre Dame; Ohio State; USC | Dropped: Houston; Penn State; Pittsburgh; Rice; SMU; Tennessee | Dropped: Baylor; Navy; Stanford; TCU; Texas; UCLA | Dropped: Georgia Tech; Tennessee | Dropped: Arkansas; North Carolina; Oregon State; Pittsburgh; Washington State; Wisconsin | Dropped: Illinois; LSU; Minnesota; Rice; UCLA | Dropped: Colorado; Dartmouth; Florida; Texas | Dropped: Arkansas; Georgia Tech; Missouri; Notre Dame | Dropped: Clemson; Illinois; TCU | Dropped: Michigan; Oregon | Dropped: Oregon State | |

== United Press Coaches Poll ==
The final United Press (UP) Coaches Poll was released prior to the bowl games on December 2.
Ohio State received 14 of the 35 first-place votes; Auburn received eleven, Michigan State eight, and two to Arizona State.

UP poll
| Rank | Team | 1st place votes | Total points |
|---|---|---|---|
| 1 | Ohio State | 14 | 307 |
| 2 | Auburn | 11 | 290 |
| 3 | Michigan State | 8 | 283 |
| 4 | Oklahoma | | 195 |
| 5 | Iowa | | 192 |
| 6 | Navy | | 177 |
| 7 | Rice | | 117 |
| 8 | Ole Miss | | 81 |
| 9 | Notre Dame | | 60 |
| 10 | Texas A&M | | 58 |
| 11 | Texas | | 36 |
| 12 | Arizona State | 2 | 32 |
| 13 | Army | | 19 |
| 13 | Duke | | 19 |
| 13 | Wisconsin | | 19 |
| 16 | Tennessee | | 8 |
| 17 | Oregon | | 7 |
| 18 | Clemson | | 6 |
| 18 | UCLA | | 6 |
| 20 | NC State | | 5 |

== Football Writers Association of America ==
In January 1958, the Football Writers Association of America (FWAA) published its ranking of the top teams. The rankings were based on voting by a five-man committee consisting of Bert McGrane of the Des Moines Register & Tribune; Bill Rives of the Dallas News; Bill Leiser of the San Francisco Chronicle; Fred Russell of the Nashville Banner; and I.R. McVay of Look magazine. Points were counted on the basis of three points for a first-place vote, two points for second, and one point for third. The top-ranked team in the FWAA rankings received the Grantland Rice Award. The top teams determined by the FWAA were:

1. Ohio State - 8 points (two first-place votes and one second-place vote)
2. Auburn - 5 points (three-way tie, each with one first-place vote)
2. Navy - 5 points (three-way tie, each with one first-place vote)
2. Michigan State - 5 points (three-way tie, each with one first-place vote)
5. Oklahoma - 4 points
6. Ole Miss - 2 points
7. Iowa - 1 point

== INS poll ==
The final 1957 INS rankings were released at the beginning of December. The rankings were determined by the votes of a "panel of experts" consisting of former coaches Bernie Bierman and Andy Kerr, sportswriter Francis J. Powers, INS columnist Bob Considine, and INS sports editor John Barrington. The INS panel selected the following as their top ten teams:

1. Ohio State, 38 points
2. Auburn, 37 points
3. Michigan State, 33 points
4. Oklahoma, 26 points
5. Iowa, 25 points
6. Ole Miss, 20 points
7. Navy, 20 points
8. Rice, 12 points
9. Texas A&M, 8 points
10. Notre Dame, 4 points

== Litkenhous Ratings ==
An early mathematical ranking system was developed by Vanderbilt University professor Edward Litkenhous. These were known as the Litkenhous Ratings or the Litkenhous "difference-by-score" rankings. Whereas other rankings were limited to the top 10 or 20 teams, Litkenhous ranked over 550 college football teams. The final Litkenhous rankings were issued in early December 1957, and his complete rankings from 1 to 170 are set forth below.

1. Ohio State (9–1) - 106.7
2. Auburn (10–0) - 103.3
3. Michigan State (8–1) - 103.2
4. Iowa (7–1–1) - 103.1
5. Ole Miss (9–1–1) - 102.9
6. Navy (9–1–1) - 102.8
7. Wisconsin (6–3) - 101.9
8. Oklahoma (10–1) - 101.7
9. Rice (7–4) - 99.1
10. Texas A&M (8–3) - 98.4
11. Tennessee (8–3) - 98.2
12. Notre Dame (7–3) - 97.9
13. Purdue (5–4) - 97.6
14. Duke (6–3–2) - 97.6
15. Arizona State (10–0) - 96.9
16. Illinois (4–5) - 96.3
17. Florida (6–2–1) - 95.7
18. Clemson (7–3) - 94.3
19. Michigan (5–3–1) - 94.2
20. Mississippi State (6–2–1)
21. Texas (6–4–1) - 94.1
22. Arkansas (6–4 ) - 93.7
23. NC State (7–1–2) - 93.4
24. LSU (5–5) - 93.1
25. UCLA (8–2) - 93.1
26. Army (7–2) - 92.9
27. Minnesota (4–5) - 92.4
28. North Carolina (6–4) -91.4
29. TCU (5–4–1) - 90.8
30. Georgia Tech (4–4–2) - 90.4
31. Oregon State (8–2) - 89.9
32. Miami (FL) (6–3) - 89.8
33. Oregon (7–4) - 89.5
34. Kentucky (3–7) - 89.4
35. Stanford (6–4) - 89.3
36. South Carolina (5–5) - 88.4
37. Maryland (5–5) - 88.1
38. Washington State (6–4) - 88.1
39. Vanderbilt (5–3–2) - 86.9
40. SMU (4–5–1) - 86.5
41. California (1–9) - 85.6
42. Georgia (3–7) - 85.3
43. Baylor (3–6–1) - 84.6
44. Colorado - 84.2
45. West Virginia (7–2–1) - 84.2
46. Pittsburgh (4–6) - 83.1
47. Penn State (6–3) - 82.3
48. Houston (5–4–1) - 82.0
49. Oklahoma State (6–3–1) - 81.5
50. Mississippi Southern (8–3) - 81.0
51. Idaho (4–4–1) - 80.8
52. Virginia (3–6–1) - 80.5
53. Washington (2–8) - 80.4
54. Syracuse (5–3–1) - 90.0
55. Utah (6–4) - 79.2
56. Holy Cross (5–3–1) - 78.8
57. Missouri (5–4–1) - 78.8
58. Abilene Christian - 78.7
59. Boston College (7–2) - 78.3
60. Alabama (2–7–1) - 78.2
61. VMI (9–0–1) - 77.2
62. Florida State (4–6) - 76.1
63. Tulane (2–8) - 76.1
64. West Texas - 75.8
65. Louisville (9–1) - 75.7
66. USC (1–9) - 75.4
67. East Texas - 75.0
68. Drake (7–2) - 74.7
69. Detroit (6–3) - 74.6
70. Villanova (3–6) - 74.5
71. Texas Western (6–3) - 74.3
72. Yale (6–2–1) - 74.3
73. North Texas (5–5) - 73.9
74. Memphis State (6–4) - 73.8
75. Princeton (7–2) - 73.8
76. Northwestern (0–9) - 73.5
77. Bowling Green (6–1–2) - 73.4
78. Lenoir Rhyne - 73.4
79. Texas Tech (2–8) - 73.4
80. Kansas State (3–6–1) - 73.3
81. William & Mary (4–6) - 73.3
82. Pacific (5–3–2) - 73.0
83. Virginia Tech (4–6) - 73.0
84. Delaware (4–3) - 72.9
85. Wake Forest (0–10) - 72.5
86. Hardin Simmons (5–5) - 72.4
87. Middle Tennessee (10–0) - 72.4
88. Lamar Tech (8–0–2) - 71.8
89. Iowa State - 71.7
90. McNeese State (8–2) - 71.7
91. Chattanooga (4–5–1) - 71.5
92. Miami (OH) (6–3) - 70.9
93. Kansas (5–4–1) - 70.6
94. Tulsa (4–6) - 70.6
95. Cincinnati (5–4–1 ) - 70.5
96. Dartmouth (7–1–1) - 70.5
97. Boston University (5–3) - 70.4
98. St. Joseph's (IN) - 70.2
99. Lehigh (8–1) - 70.0
100. Pittsburg State - 69.6
101. Xavier (5–5) - 69.1
102. Dayton - 68.9
103. Concordia (MN) - 68.7
104. Louisiana Tech (6–4) - 68.1
105. Northwestern Louisiana - 68.0
106. Trinity (TX) - 67.9
107. Denison - 67.8
108. Penn (3–6) - 67.7
109. Cal Poly - 67.4
110. Rutgers (5–4) - 67.1
111. San Francisco Austin - 67.1
112. Williams - 66.9
113. Fresno State (5–5) - 66.3
114. Amherst - 66.0
115. Texas A&I - 65.8
116. Brown (5–4) - 65.6
117. Indiana (1–8) - 65.6
118. St. Benedict's - 65.5
119. Wofford - 65.5
120. Idaho State (9–0) - 65.4
121. Lincoln (MO) - 65.3
122. Wyoming (4–3–3) - 65.1
123. Arizona State-Flagstaff (8–1) - 64.8
124. Macalester - 64.7
125. Nebraska (1–9) - 64.4
126. San Jose State (3–7) - 64.3
127. McMurry - 64.2
128. West Chester (8–0) - 64.0
129. Tufts - 63.9
130. Kearney - 63.5
131. Tampa (6–3) - 62.5
132. BYU (5–3–2) - 62.3
133. Denver (6–4) - 62.0
134. St. Norbert (8–0) - 62.0
135. George Washington (2–7) - 61.9
136. Montana State (8–2) - 61.9
137. Marshall (6–3) - 61.6
138. Gettysburg - 61.5
139. Toledo (5–4) - 61.5
140. Hillsdale - 61.3
141. Marquette (0–10) - 61.3
142. Stockton - 60.5
143. Florence (AL) - 60.3
144. The Citadel (5–4–1) - 60.1
145. New Mexico (4–6) - 59.9
146. Howard Payne - 59.6
147. UC Santa Barbara (6–2) - 59.3
148. Air Force (3–6–1) - 59.3
149. Elon - 59.3
150. Sam Houston (3–5–1) - 59.2
151. Muskingum - 59.1
152. Southeastern Louisiana - 59.1
153. Western Michigan (4–4–1) - 58.9
154. Cornell (3–6) - 58.3
155. Richmond (4–6) - 58.8
156. Iowa State Teachers - 58.7
157. Akron (7–1–1) - 58.4
158. Fresno JC - 58.3
159. Wichita (1–9 ) - 58.2
160. Wheaton - 58.1
161. Davidson (5–3) - 58.0
162. St. Ambrose - 57.8
163. Butler - 57.5
164. New Mexico A&M (3–7 ) - 57.5
165. Bradley - 57.4
166. Ohio (2–6–1) - 57.4
167. Hawaii (4–4–1) - 57.2
168. Wittenberg - 57.2
169. Utah State (2–7–1) - 57.1
170. Connecticut (5–4–1) - 56.8
Selected others
173. Arizona (1–8–1) - 56.7
182. Eastern Kentucky - 55.5
185. Furman (3–7) - 55.2
191. Colgate (3–6) - 54.5
192. East Tennessee
195. Tennessee Tech
218. Harvard (3–5) - 50.9
219. Youngstown - 50.9
227. Wooster - 49.2
229. Columbia (1–8) - 49.0
230. Carson Newman - 48.9

== See also ==
- 1957 College Football All-America Team
