= 1957–58 NCAA football bowl games =

College football postseason game series

- Season: 1957
- Number of bowls: 7
- All-star games: Blue–Gray Football Classic; East–West Shrine Game; North–South Shrine Game; Senior Bowl
- Bowl games: December 28, 1957 – January 1, 1958 (Note: Excludes all-star games.)
- Champions: Auburn (AP); Ohio State (Coaches, FWAA)
Bowl record by conference
Conference	Bowls	Record	Number of teams in final AP poll
Independents	4	2–2 (0.500)	3
SWC	3	0–3 (0.000)	3
SEC	2	2–0 (1.000)	5
Big Ten	1	1–0 (1.000)	4
Big Seven	1	1–0 (1.000)	1
Lone Star	1	1–0 (1.000)	0
ACC	1	0–1 (0.000)	2
PCC	1	0–1 (0.000)	0
Border	0	0–0 (–)	1
SoCon	0	0–0 (–)	1

The 1957–58 NCAA football bowl games were a series of post-season games played in December 1957 and January 1958 to end the 1957 college football season. A total of seven team-competitive games, and four all-star games, were played. The post-season began with the Gator Bowl on December 28, 1957, and concluded on January 11, 1958, with the season-ending Senior Bowl all-star game.

== Schedule ==
The following table lists bowl games involving University Division teams; (Note: Teams in this seasons's Tangerine Bowl were not from the University Division, but the bowl is included due to its history with such teams.) bowl games at lower levels are listed in the See also section.

The seven team-competitive bowls were unchanged from the prior season.

Date	Game	Site	Time (US EST)	TV	Matchup (pre-game record)	AP pre-game rank	UPI (Coaches) pre-game rank
12/28	Gator Bowl	Gator Bowl Stadium; Jacksonville, Florida	2:00 p.m.	CBS	Tennessee 3 (7–3) (SEC); Texas A&M 0 (8–2) (SWC)	#13 #9	#16 #10
1/1	Orange Bowl	Burdine Stadium; Miami, Florida	1:30 p.m.	CBS	Oklahoma 48 (9–1) (Big Seven); Duke 21 (6–2–2) (ACC)	#4 #16	#4 #14
1/1	Sugar Bowl	Tulane Stadium; New Orleans, Louisiana	1:45 p.m.	NBC	Ole Miss 39 (8–1–1) (SEC); Texas 7 (6–3–1) (SWC)	#7 #11	#8 #11
1/1	Cotton Bowl Classic	Cotton Bowl; Dallas, Texas	4:15 p.m.	CBS	Navy 20 (8–1–1) (Independent); Rice 7 (7–3) (SWC)	#5 #8	#6 #7
1/1	Sun Bowl	Kidd Field; El Paso, Texas	4:15 p.m.	—	Louisville 34 (8–1) (Independent); Drake 20 (7–1) (Independent)	NR; NR	NR; NR
1/1	Rose Bowl	Rose Bowl; Pasadena, California	4:45 p.m.	NBC	Ohio State 10 (8–1) (Big Ten); Oregon 7 (7–3) (PCC)	#2; NR	#1 #17
1/1	Tangerine Bowl	Tangerine Bowl (stadium); Orlando, Florida	8:00 p.m.	—	East Texas State 10 (8–1) (Lone Star); Mississippi Southern 9 (8–2) (Independent)	n/a	n/a

=== Conference performance in bowl games ===
Conference	Games	Record			Bowls	
Conference	Games	W	L	Pct.	Won	Lost
Independents	4	2	2	.500	Cotton, Sun	Tangerine, Sun
SWC	3	0	3	.000	—	Gator, Sugar, Cotton
SEC	2	2	0	1.000	Gator, Sugar	—
Big Seven	1	1	0	1.000	Orange	—
Big Ten	1	1	0	1.000	Rose	—
Lone Star	1	1	0	1.000	Tangerine	—
ACC	1	0	1	.000	—	Orange
Pacific Coast	1	0	1	.000	—	Rose

== See also ==
- Holiday Bowl (NAIA)
- Prairie View Bowl
