= List of NCAA college football rankings =

The AP Poll and Coaches Poll are the two major polls used annually within the highest level of college football to determine the national championship. Division I FBS football is the only National Collegiate Athletic Association (NCAA) sport for which the NCAA does not sanction a yearly championship event. As such, it is sometimes unofficially referred to as a "mythical national championship".

These polling systems began with the introduction of the AP poll in 1936, followed by the Coaches' Poll in 1950.

Currently, two widely recognized national champion selectors are the Associated Press, which conducts a poll of sportswriters, and the Coaches' Poll, a survey of active members of the American Football Coaches Association.

Until the 1968 NCAA University Division football season, the final AP Poll of the season was released following the end of the regular season, with the exception of the 1965 season.

== NCAA Division I and FBS poll seasons (1936–present) ==
The AP Poll began with the 1936 college football season. The Coaches Poll began with the 1950 college football season and became the second major polling system. In 1978, Division I football was split into two distinct divisions and a second poll was added for the new Division I-AA.

Poll season	Bowl season	Champion
1936	1936–37 bowl season	Minnesota
1937	1937–38 bowl season	Pittsburgh
1938	1938–39 bowl season	TCU
1939	1939–40 bowl season	Texas A&M
1940	1940–41 bowl season	Minnesota
1941	1941–42 bowl season	Minnesota
1942	1942–43 bowl season	Ohio State
1943	1943–44 bowl season	Notre Dame
1944	1944–45 bowl season	Army
1945	1945–46 bowl season	Army
1946	1946–47 bowl season	Notre Dame
1947	1947–48 bowl season	Notre Dame
1948	1948–49 bowl season	Michigan
1949	1949–50 bowl season	Notre Dame
1950	1950–51 bowl season	Oklahoma
1951	1951–52 bowl season	Tennessee
1952	1952–53 bowl season	Michigan State
1953	1953–54 bowl season	Maryland
1954	1954–55 bowl season	Ohio State (AP), UCLA (Coaches)
1955	1955–56 bowl season	Oklahoma
1956	1956–57 bowl season	Oklahoma
1957	1957–58 bowl season	Auburn (AP), Ohio State (Coaches)
1958	1958–59 bowl season	LSU
1959	1959–60 bowl season	Syracuse
1960	1960–61 bowl season	Minnesota
1961	1961–62 bowl season	Alabama
1962	1962–63 bowl season	USC
1963	1963–64 bowl season	Texas
1964	1964–65 bowl season	Alabama
1965	1965–66 bowl season	Alabama (AP), Michigan State (Coaches)
1966	1966–67 bowl season	Notre Dame
1967	1967–68 bowl season	USC
1968	1968–69 bowl season	Ohio State
1969	1969–70 bowl season	Texas
1970	1970–71 bowl season	Nebraska (AP), Texas (Coaches)
1971	1971–72 bowl season	Nebraska
1972	1972–73 bowl season	USC
1973	1973–74 bowl season	Notre Dame (AP), Alabama (Coaches)
1974	1974–75 bowl season	Oklahoma (AP), USC (Coaches)
1975	1975–76 bowl season	Oklahoma
1976	1976–77 bowl season	Pittsburgh
1977	1977–78 bowl season	Notre Dame
1978	1978–79 bowl season	Alabama (AP), USC (Coaches)
1979	1979–80 bowl season	Alabama
1980	1980–81 bowl season	Georgia
1981	1981–82 bowl season	Clemson
1982	1982–83 bowl season	Penn State
1983	1983–84 bowl season	Miami (FL)
1984	1984–85 bowl season	BYU
1985	1985–86 bowl season	Oklahoma
1986	1986–87 bowl season	Penn State
1987	1987–88 bowl season	Miami (FL)
1988	1988–89 bowl season	Notre Dame
1989	1989–90 bowl season	Miami (FL)
1990	1990–91 bowl season	Colorado (AP), Georgia Tech (Coaches)
1991	1991–92 bowl season	Miami (FL) (AP), Washington (Coaches)
1992	1992–93 bowl season	Alabama
1993	1993–94 bowl season	Florida State
1994	1994–95 bowl season	Nebraska
1995	1995–96 bowl season	Nebraska
1996	1996–97 bowl season	Florida
1997	1997–98 bowl season	Michigan (AP), Nebraska (Coaches)
1998	1998–99 bowl season	Tennessee
1999	1999–2000 bowl season	Florida State
2000	2000–01 bowl season	Oklahoma
2001	2001–02 bowl season	Miami (FL)
2002	2002–03 bowl season	Ohio State
2003	2003–04 bowl season	USC (AP), LSU (Coaches)
2004	2004–05 bowl season	USC
2005	2005–06 bowl season	Texas
2006	2006–07 bowl season	Florida
2007	2007–08 bowl season	LSU
2008	2008–09 bowl season	Florida
2009	2009–10 bowl season	Alabama
2010	2010–11 bowl season	Auburn
2011	2011–12 bowl season	Alabama
2012	2012–13 bowl season	Alabama
2013	2013–14 bowl season	Florida State
2014	2014–15 bowl season	Ohio State
2015	2015–16 bowl season	Alabama
2016	2016–17 bowl season	Clemson
2017	2017–18 bowl season	Alabama
2018	2018–19 bowl season	Clemson
2019	2019–20 bowl season	LSU
2020	2020–21 bowl season	Alabama
2021	2021–22 bowl season	Georgia
2022	2022–23 bowl season	Georgia
2023	2023–24 bowl season	Michigan
2024	2024–25 bowl season	Ohio State
2025	2025–26 bowl season	Indiana
2026	2026–27 bowl season	TBD

== NCAA Division I FCS poll seasons (1978–present) ==
NCAA Division I football was divided into Division I-A and Division I-AA beginning with the inaugural 1978 NCAA Division I-AA football season, initially serving as a voluntary designation and later formalized with specific criteria in 1981. This split allowed independent polling of both divisions in the 1978 season. In 2006, Division I-AA was renamed as Division I FCS.

Poll season	FCS season	Playoff Champion
1978	1978 season	Florida A&M
1979	1979 season	Eastern Kentucky
1980	1980 season	Boise State
1981	1981 season	Idaho State
1982	1982 season	Eastern Kentucky
1983	1983 season	Southern Illinois
1984	1984 season	Montana State
1985	1985 season	Georgia Southern
1986	1986 season	Georgia Southern
1987	1987 season	Northeast Louisiana
1988	1988 season	Furman
1989	1989 season	Georgia Southern
1990	1990 season	Georgia Southern
1991	1991 season	Youngstown State
1992	1992 season	Marshall
1993	1993 season	Youngstown State
1994	1994 season	Youngstown State
1995	1995 season	Montana
1996	1996 season	Marshall
1997	1997 season	Youngstown State
1998	1998 season	Massachusetts
1999	1999 season	Georgia Southern
2000	2000 season	Georgia Southern
2001	2001 season	Montana
2002	2002 season	Western Kentucky
2003	2003 season	Delaware
2004	2004 season	James Madison
2005	2005 season	Appalachian State
2006	2006 season	Appalachian State
2007	2007 season	Appalachian State
2008	2008 season	Richmond
2009	2009 season	Villanova
2010	2010 season	Eastern Washington
2011	2011 season	North Dakota State
2012	2012 season	North Dakota State
2013	2013 season	North Dakota State
2014	2014 season	North Dakota State
2015	2015 season	North Dakota State
2016	2016 season	James Madison
2017	2017 season	North Dakota State
2018	2018 season	North Dakota State
2019	2019 season	North Dakota State
2020	2020 season	Sam Houston State
2021	2021 season	North Dakota State
2022	2022 season	South Dakota State
2023	2023 season	South Dakota State
2024	2024 season	North Dakota State
2025	2025 season	Montana State
2026	2026 season	TBD

== See also ==
- College football national championships in NCAA Division I FBS
- NCAA Division I Football Championship (FCS)
- List of college football teams by weekly appearances atop AP Poll
