= 1957 Alabama Crimson Tide football team =

American college football season

1957 Alabama Crimson Tide football
- Conference: Southeastern Conference
- Record: 2–7–1 (1–6–1 SEC)
- Head coach: Jennings B. Whitworth (3rd season)
- Captains: Jim Loftin; Clay Walls
- Home stadium: Denny Stadium; Legion Field; Ladd Stadium

1957 Southeastern Conference football standings
	Conf.					Overall
Team	W		L		T	W		L		T
No. 1 Auburn $	7	–	0	–	0	10	–	0	–	0
No. 7 Ole Miss	5	–	0	–	1	9	–	1	–	1
No. 14 Mississippi State	4	–	2	–	1	6	–	2	–	1
No. 17 Florida	4	–	2	–	1	6	–	2	–	1
No. 13 Tennessee	4	–	3	–	0	8	–	3	–	0
Vanderbilt	3	–	3	–	1	5	–	3	–	2
LSU	4	–	4	–	0	5	–	5	–	0
Georgia Tech	3	–	4	–	1	4	–	4	–	2
Georgia	3	–	4	–	0	3	–	7	–	0
Tulane	1	–	5	–	0	2	–	8	–	0
Alabama	1	–	6	–	1	2	–	7	–	1
Kentucky	1	–	7	–	0	3	–	7	–	0
$ – Conference champion; Rankings from AP Poll

The 1957 Alabama Crimson Tide football team (variously "Alabama", "UA" or "Bama") represented the University of Alabama in the 1957 college football season. It was the Crimson Tide's 63rd overall and 24th season as a member of the Southeastern Conference (SEC). The team was led by head coach Jennings B. Whitworth, in his third year, and played their home games at Denny Stadium in Tuscaloosa, Legion Field in Birmingham and at Ladd Stadium in Mobile, Alabama. They finished with a record of two wins, seven losses and one tie (2–7–1 overall, 1–6–1 in the SEC).

Alabama opened the season by going winless over their first five games. After a loss at LSU, the Crimson Tide played Vanderbilt to a tie at Nashville. They then lost to TCU, Tennessee and Mississippi State before they won their first game at Georgia. The Crimson Tide then lost consecutive home games to Tulane and Georgia Tech before they won their second game of the season against Mississippi Southern. Alabama then closed the season with a 40–0 loss in the Iron Bowl against eventual national champion Auburn.

On October 24, university officials announced the contract of head coach Whitworth would not be renewed when it expired December 1 at the conclusion of the season. On December 3, former Maryland, Kentucky and then Texas A&M head coach and former Alabama player Bear Bryant was hired as both the head coach of the football team and athletic director at Alabama.

== Schedule ==
Date	Opponent	Site	Result	Attendance	Source
September 28	at LSU	Tiger Stadium; Baton Rouge, LA (rivalry)	L 0–28	33,728	
October 5	at No. 20 Vanderbilt	Dudley Field; Nashville, TN	T 6–6	24,500	
October 12	at TCU*	Amon G. Carter Stadium; Fort Worth, TX	L 0–28	20,000	
October 19	Tennessee	Legion Field; Birmingham, AL (Third Saturday in October)	L 0–14	32,000	
October 26	Mississippi State^{†}	Denny Stadium; Tuscaloosa, AL (rivalry)	L 13–25	28,000	
November 2	at Georgia	Sanford Stadium; Athens, GA (rivalry)	W 14–13	30,000	
November 9	Tulane	Ladd Stadium; Mobile, AL	L 0–7	15,000	
November 16	Georgia Tech	Legion Field; Birmingham, AL (rivalry)	L 7–10	30,000	
November 23	Mississippi Southern*	Denny Stadium; Tuscaloosa, AL	W 29–2	18,500	
November 30	vs. No. 1 Auburn	Legion Field; Birmingham, AL (Iron Bowl)	L 0–40	45,000	
*Non-conference game; ^{†}Homecoming; Rankings from AP Poll released prior to the game

== Game summaries ==
=== LSU ===
Team	1	2	3	4	Total
Alabama	0	0	0	0	0
• LSU	7	0	14	7	28

- Date: September 28
- Location: Tiger Stadium
  Baton Rouge, LA
- Game attendance: 33,728

To open the 1957 season, Alabama was shutout by LSU 28–0 at Tiger Stadium in Baton Rouge. LSU took the opening kickoff and drove 67-yards for a one-yard Jim Taylor touchdown run that gave the Tigers a 7–0 lead at halftime after a scoreless second quarter. In the third quarter, Win Turner intercepted an Alabama pass that gave LSU possession at their 40-yard line. Six plays later, Turner then threw a 42-yard touchdown pass to J. W. Brodnax for a 14–0 lead. Billy Cannon then scored the final two Tigers' touchdowns for the 28–0 victory. The first came on a 53-yard run in the third quarter and the second on a 73-yard run in the fourth quarter that followed a fake punt.

=== Vanderbilt ===
Team	1	2	3	4	Total
Alabama	6	0	0	0	6
#20 Vanderbilt	0	6	0	0	6

- Date: October 5
- Location: Dudley Field
  Nashville, TN
- Game attendance: 24,000

In their second consecutive road game to open the 1957 season, the Crimson Tide played the Vanderbilt Commodores to a 6–6 tie at Dudley Field. Alabama took an early 6–0 lead on a short James Loftin touchdown run that capped their first offensive possession. The Commodores then tied the game 6–6 in the second quarter on a four-yard William Smith touchdown run. The Crimson Tide nearly pulled off the upset late in the fourth quarter after a 58-yard Jerry Daniel punt return gave Alabama possession at the Vandy eight-yard line. However, Alabama was unable to score as time expired just prior to a fourth down play from inside the five-yard line.

=== TCU ===
Team	1	2	3	4	Total
Alabama	0	0	0	0	0
• TCU	0	14	7	7	28

- Date: October 12
- Location: Carter Stadium
  Fort Worth, TX

For the third consecutive season, Alabama played the Texas Christian University (TCU) Horned Frogs of the Southwest Conference, and for the third time in as many years the Crimson Tide lost 28–0. After a scoreless first quarter, TCU took a 14–0 halftime lead after they scored a pair short second-quarter touchdown runs by Buddy Dike and Marvin Lasater. The Frogs then closed the game with a 49-yard Dick Finney quarterback sneak for a touchdown in the third and on a short Jim Shofner touchdown run in the fourth to win 28–0.

=== Tennessee ===
Third Saturday in October

Team	1	2	3	4	Total
• Tennessee	0	0	0	14	14
Alabama	0	0	0	0	0

- Date: October 19
- Location: Legion Field
  Birmingham, AL

In their annual rivalry game against Tennessee, the score was tied at zero as the teams entered the fourth quarter. However, a pair of touchdowns by the Volunteers in the final quarter gave Tennessee the 14–0 victory in Birmingham. The Vols touchdowns were scored on a nine-yard Bobby Gordon touchdown pass to Tommy Potts and then on a four-yard Gordon run in the win.

=== Mississippi State ===
Team	1	2	3	4	Total
• Mississippi State	6	6	0	13	25
Alabama	6	0	0	7	13

- Date: October 26
- Location: Denny Stadium
  Tuscaloosa, AL
- Game attendance: 28,000

One year after the Crimson Tide defeated Mississippi State to end their 17-game losing streak, the Maroons were victorious on homecoming at Denny Stadium by a final score of 25–13. Alabama took a 6–0 lead on the second play of the game when Jim Loftin scored on a 65-yard touchdown run. The lead was short lived as on the Maroons possession that ensued, Billy Stacy threw a 57-yard touchdown pass to Charles Weatherly that tied the game 6–6. State then took a 12–6 halftime lead on a 21-yard Gil Peterson touchdown run in the second quarter.

After a scoreless third quarter, the Maroons extended their lead to 25–6 in the fourth quarter on short touchdown runs by Molly Halbert and Robert Collins. The Crimson Tide then made the final score 25–13 on a 62-yard Bobby Jackson touchdown pass to Marlin Dyess late in the final period.

=== Georgia ===
Team	1	2	3	4	Total
• Alabama	0	14	0	0	14
Georgia	6	0	7	0	13

- Date: November 2
- Location: Sanford Stadium
  Athens, GA
- Game attendance: 30,000

Against the Georgia Bulldogs, Alabama won their first game of the season 14–13 at Sanford Stadium in Athens. The Bulldogs took a 6–0 first quarter lead after Theron Sapp scored on a one-yard touchstone run. The Crimson Tide responded with a pair of second-quarter touchdowns and took a 14–6 halftime lead. Both scores came on a pair of Bobby Smith touchdown passes, the first to Charles Gray from 46-yards and the second to Willie Beck from 16-yards out. Georgia was able to score a second touchdown in the third quarter on a six-yard Charles Britt pass to Donald Soberdash; however, the blocked extra point from their first score provided the final margin of defeat for the Bulldogs.

=== Tulane ===
Team	1	2	3	4	Total
• Tulane	7	0	0	0	7
Alabama	0	0	0	0	0

- Date: November 9
- Location: Ladd Stadium
  Mobile, AL

In their annual home game played at Ladd Stadium, the Crimson Tide were shutout 7–0 by the Tulane Green Wave at Mobile. The only points of the game came on a four-yard Richie Petitbon touchdown run in the first quarter.

=== Georgia Tech ===
Team	1	2	3	4	Total
• Georgia Tech	0	0	0	10	10
Alabama	7	0	0	0	7

- Date: November 16
- Location: Legion Field
  Birmingham, AL
- Game attendance: 30,000

Against Georgia Tech, Alabama lost 10–7 to the Yellow Jackets at Legion Field. The Crimson Tide took a 7–0 first quarter lead after Danny Wilbanks scored on a one-yard touchdown run that capped an 80-yard drive. Alabama held the lead through the fourth quarter, but Tech scored ten points to win in the final period. Freddie Braselton tied the game 7–7 with his one-yard touchdown run and then Urban Henry scored the game-winning field goal late in the fourth that made the final score 10–7.

=== Mississippi Southern ===
Team	1	2	3	4	Total
Miss Southern	0	0	0	2	2
• Alabama	0	7	15	7	29

- Date: November 23
- Location: Denny Stadium
  Tuscaloosa, AL
- Game attendance: 18,500

In their final non-conference game of the season, Alabama won their second game of the season against the Mississippi Southern Golden Eagles 29–2 at Denny Stadium. After a scoreless first quarter, Alabama took a 7–0 halftime lead on a one-yard Danny Wilbanks touchdown run in the second quarter. After Wilbanks scored his second touchdown in the third quarter, Southern gave up a safety on a bad snap on a punt attempt. On the free kick that ensued, Clay Walls returned it 66-yards for a touchdown and a 22–0 lead. After the Crimson Tide took a 29–0 lead in the fourth quarter on a 14-yard Bobby Skelton touchdown pass to Marlin Dyess before the Southerners ended the shutout attempt when Skelton was sacked for a safety.

=== Auburn ===
Iron Bowl

Team	1	2	3	4	Total
• #1 Auburn	14	20	6	0	40
Alabama	0	0	0	0	0

- Date: November 30
- Location: Legion Field
  Birmingham, AL
- Game attendance: 45,000

Against the rival Auburn, the Tigers scored 34 first half points en route to a 40–0 shutout victory at Legion Field in the season finale. After the Tigers recovered an Alabama fumble on their first possession, Auburn took a 7–0 lead on a one-yard Bill Atkins touchdown run. Atkins then extended their lead to 14–0 with a six-yard touchdown run later in the first that capped a six-play, 62-yard drive. Up by 14, three second-quarter touchdowns resulted in a 34–0 halftime lead for Auburn. Points were scored on a two-yard Lloyd Nix run and on interception returns of 21-yards by Tommy Lorino and 66-yards by Jackie Burkett.

The final Auburn touchdown was scored in the third on a 27-yard Nix pass to Jim Phillips that made the final score 40–0. Three days after their victory over the Crimson Tide, Auburn was recognized as the 1957 national champions by the final AP poll of the season.

== After the season ==
In the week that followed their loss to Tennessee, the University of Alabama Faculty Committee on Physical Education and Athletics announced the university would not renew coach Whitworth's contract effective December 1 at the conclusion of the season. On December 3, the university formally introduced then Texas A&M head coach and former Crimson Tide player Bear Bryant as the new head coach of the Crimson Tide. At the time of the announcement, Bryant also became athletic director as the replacement for Hank Crisp and signed a ten-year contract to serve as Alabama's head coach.

== Personnel ==
=== Varsity letter winners ===
Player	Hometown	Position
Charles Allen	Athens, Alabama	End
Willie Beck	Northport, Alabama	End
Ralph Blalock	Cullman, Alabama	End
Jim Blevins	Moulton, Alabama	Tackle
Baxter Booth	Athens, Alabama	End
Jerre Brannen	Anniston, Alabama	End
Marshall Brown	Ladysmith, Wisconsin	Fullback
Donald Cochran	Birmingham, Alabama	Guard
Marlin Dyess	Elba, Alabama	Halfback
Charles Gray	Pell City, Alabama	End
William Hannah	Indianapolis, Indiana	Tackle
Bobby Jackson	Mobile, Alabama	Quarterback
William Knight	Homewood, Alabama	Halfback
James Loftin	Dothan, Alabama	Halfback
Sidney Neighbors	Northport, Alabama	Tackle
Robert O'Steen	Anniston, Alabama	Fullback
Donald Owen	Memphis, Tennessee	End
Billy Raines	Moulton, Alabama	Guard
Kenneth Roberts	Anniston, Alabama	Center
Authur Scott	Jasper, Alabama	Tackle
Dave Sington	Birmingham, Alabama	Tackle
Robert Skelton	Pell City, Alabama	Quarterback
Bobby Smith	Brewton, Alabama	Quarterback
Sammy Smith	Talladega, Alabama	Guard
Ravis Stickney	Key West, Florida	Fullback
Richard Strum	Biloxi, Mississippi	Halfback
Carl Valletto	Oakmont, Pennsylvania	End
Bland Walker Jr.	Eutaw, Alabama	Center
Clay Walls	Bessemer, Alabama	Halfback
Danny Wilbanks	Tallassee, Alabama	Fullback
William Wood	Guntersville, Alabama	End

=== Coaching staff ===
Name	Position	Seasons at Alabama	Alma mater
Jennings B. Whitworth	Head coach	3	Alabama (1932)
Lew Bostick	Assistant coach	14	Alabama (1939)
Hank Crisp	Assistant coach	30	VPI (1920)
Dorsey Gibson	Assistant coach	2	Oklahoma A&M (1953)
Jim Goostree	Assistant coach	1	Tennessee (1952)
Howard "Moose" Johnson	Assistant coach	3	Georgia (1948)
Joe Kilgrow	Assistant coach	14	Alabama (1937)
Malcolm Laney	Assistant coach	14	Alabama (1932)
Barney Poole	Assistant coach	2	Ole Miss (1948)
Joe Thomas	Assistant coach	3	Oklahoma A&M (1947)
