= 1957 Ivy League football season =

- League: NCAA University Division
- Sport: Football
- Duration: September 28, 1957 – November 28, 1957
- Teams: 8

1958 NFL Draft
- Top draft pick: Gil Robertshaw (Brown)
- Picked by: Chicago Cardinals, 111th overall

Regular season
- Champions: Princeton

Football seasons
- ← 1956 1958 →

1957 Ivy League football standings
	Conf.					Overall
Team	W		L		T	W		L		T
Princeton $	6	–	1	–	0	7	–	2	–	0
Dartmouth	5	–	1	–	1	7	–	1	–	1
Yale	4	–	2	–	1	6	–	2	–	1
Brown	3	–	4	–	0	5	–	4	–	0
Cornell	3	–	4	–	0	3	–	6	–	0
Penn	3	–	4	–	0	3	–	6	–	0
Harvard	2	–	5	–	0	3	–	5	–	0
Columbia	1	–	6	–	0	1	–	8	–	0
$ – Conference champion

The 1957 Ivy League football season was the second season of college football play for the Ivy League and was part of the 1957 college football season. The season began on September 28, 1957, and ended on November 28, 1957. Ivy League teams were 7–6 against non-conference opponents and Princeton won the conference championship.

== Season overview ==
Conf. Rank	Team	Head coach	AP final	AP high	Overall record	Conf. record	PPG	PAG
1	Princeton	Dick Colman	NR	NR	7–2	6–1	22.9	10.6
2	Dartmouth	Bob Blackman	NR	#20	7–1–1	5–1–1	18.1	8.6
3	Yale	Jordan Olivar	NR	NR	6–2–1	4–2–1	23.6	9.8
4 (tie)	Brown	Alva Kelley	NR	NR	5–4	3–4	17.1	13.9
4 (tie)	Cornell	George K. James	NR	NR	3–6	3–4	11.1	17.7
4 (tie)	Penn	Steve Sebo	NR	NR	3–6	3–4	13.4	15.3
7	Harvard	John Yovicsin	NR	NR	3–5	2–5	9.8	22.5
8	Columbia	Aldo Donelli	NR	NR	1–8	1–6	6.0	23.8

== Schedule ==
Index to colors and formatting
Ivy League member won
Ivy League member lost
Ivy League teams in **bold**

=== Week 1 ===
Date	Visiting team	Home team	Site	Result
September 28	Rutgers	Princeton	Palmer Stadium • Princeton, NJ	**W** 7–0
September 28	New Hampshire	Dartmouth	Memorial Field • Hanover, NH	**W** 27–0
September 28	Connecticut	Yale	Yale Bowl • New Haven, CT	**W** 27–0
September 28	**Columbia**	Brown	Brown Stadium • Providence, RI	**COL** 23–20
September 28	Colgate	Cornell	Schoellkopf Field • Ithaca, NY	**L** 13–14
September 28	#19 Penn State	Penn	Franklin Field • Philadelphia, PA	**L** 14–19

Date	Bye Week
September 28	Harvard

=== Week 2 ===
Date	Visiting team	Home team	Site	Result
October 5	**Princeton**	**Columbia**	Baker Field • New York City, NY	**PRIN** 47–6
October 5	**Dartmouth**	**Penn**	Franklin Field • Philadelphia, PA	**DART** 6–3
October 5	**Brown**	**Yale**	Yale Bowl • New Haven, CT	**BROWN** 21–20
October 5	**Cornell**	**Harvard**	Harvard Stadium • Boston, MA	**COR** 20–6

=== Week 3 ===
Date	Visiting team	Home team	Site	Result
October 12	**Penn**	**Princeton**	Palmer Stadium • Princeton, NJ	**PRIN** 13–9
October 12	**Brown**	**Dartmouth**	Memorial Field • Hanover, NH	**DART** 35–0
October 12	**Columbia**	**Yale**	Yale Bowl • New Haven, CT	**YALE** 19–0
October 12	Syracuse	**Cornell**	Schoellkopf Field • Ithaca, NY	**L** 0–34
October 12	Ohio	**Harvard**	Harvard Stadium • Boston, MA	**W** 14–7

=== Week 4 ===
Date	Visiting team	Home team	Site	Result
October 19	Colgate	**Princeton**	Palmer Stadium • Princeton, NJ	**L** 10–12
October 19	**Dartmouth**	Holy Cross	Fitton Field • Worcester, MA	**W** 14–7
October 19	**Yale**	**Cornell**	Schoellkopf Field • Ithaca, NY	**YALE** 18–7
October 19	**Penn**	**Brown**	Brown Stadium • Providence, RI	**BROWN** 20–7
October 19	**Columbia**	**Harvard**	Harvard Stadium • Boston, MA	**HAR** 19–6

=== Week 5 ===
Date	Visiting team	Home team	Site	Result
October 26	**Cornell**	Princeton	Palmer Stadium • Princeton, NJ	**PRIN** 47–14
October 26	**Dartmouth**	Harvard	Harvard Stadium • Boston, MA	**DART** 26–0
October 26	Colgate	Yale	Colgate University • Hamilton, NY	**W** 20–0
October 26	Rhode Island	Brown	Brown Stadium • Providence, RI	**BROWN** 21–7
October 26	#16 Navy	Penn	Franklin Field • Philadelphia, PA	**NAVY** 35–7
October 26	Lehigh	Columbia	Baker Field • New York City, NY	**L** 6–40

=== Week 6 ===
Date	Visiting team	Home team	Site	Result
November 2	**Princeton**	**Brown**	Brown Stadium • Providence, RI	**PRIN** 7–0
November 2	#20 **Dartmouth**	**Yale**	Yale Bowl • New Haven, CT	**T** 14–14
November 2	**Columbia**	**Cornell**	Schoellkopf Field • Ithaca, NY	**COR** 8–0
November 2	**Harvard**	**Penn**	Franklin Field • Philadelphia, PA	**HAR** 13–6

=== Week 7 ===
Date	Visiting team	Home team	Site	Result
November 9	**Princeton**	**Harvard**	Harvard Stadium • Boston, MA	**PRIN** 28–20
November 9	**Dartmouth**	**Columbia**	Baker Field • New York City, NY	**DART** 7–0
November 9	**Yale**	**Penn**	Franklin Field • Philadelphia, PA	**PENN** 33–20
November 9	**Brown**	**Cornell**	Schoellkopf Field • Ithaca, NY	**COR** 13–6

=== Week 8 ===
Date	Visiting team	Home team	Site	Result
November 16	**Yale**	**Princeton**	Palmer Stadium • Princeton, NJ	**YALE** 20–13
November 16	**Cornell**	**Dartmouth**	Memorial Field • Hanover, NH	**DART** 20–19
November 16	**Brown**	**Harvard**	Harvard Stadium • Boston, MA	**BROWN** 33–6
November 16	**Penn**	**Columbia**	Baker Field • New York City, NY	**PENN** 28–6

=== Week 9 ===
Date	Visiting team	Home team	Site	Result
November 23	**Dartmouth**	**Princeton**	Palmer Stadium • Princeton, NJ	**PRIN** 34–14
November 23	**Harvard**	**Yale**	Yale Bowl • New Haven, CT	**YALE** 54–0
November 23	Rutgers	**Columbia**	Baker Field • New York City, NY	**L** 7–26
November 28	Colgate	**Brown**	Brown Stadium • Providence, RI	**W** 33–7
November 28	**Cornell**	**Penn**	Franklin Field • Philadelphia, PA	**PENN** 14–6

== 1958 NFL draft ==
One Ivy League player was drafted in the 1958 NFL draft, held in December 1957 and January 1958: Gil Robertshaw.

Rnd.	Pick No.	NFL team	Player	Pos.	College	Conf.	Notes
10	111	Chicago Cardinals	Gil Robertshaw	T	Brown	Ivy	
