= 1957 Penn Quakers football team =

American college football season

1957 Penn Quakers football
- Conference: Ivy League
- Record: 3–6 (3–4 Ivy)
- Head coach: Steve Sebo (4th season)
- Captains: Peter Keblish; David Weixelbaum
- Home stadium: Franklin Field

1957 Ivy League football standings
	Conf.					Overall
Team	W		L		T	W		L		T
Princeton $	6	–	1	–	0	7	–	2	–	0
Dartmouth	5	–	1	–	1	7	–	1	–	1
Yale	4	–	2	–	1	6	–	2	–	1
Brown	3	–	4	–	0	5	–	4	–	0
Cornell	3	–	4	–	0	3	–	6	–	0
Penn	3	–	4	–	0	3	–	6	–	0
Harvard	2	–	5	–	0	3	–	5	–	0
Columbia	1	–	6	–	0	1	–	8	–	0
$ – Conference champion

The 1957 Penn Quakers football team was an American football team that represented the University of Pennsylvania as a member of the Ivy League during the 1957 college football season.

== History ==
In its fourth year under head coach Steve Sebo, this team compiled a 3–6 record and was outscored 138 to 121. David Weixelbaum and Peter Keblish were the team captains.

Penn's 3–4 conference record tied for fourth place in the Ivy League. The Quakers outscored their Ivy opponents 100 to 84.

Penn played its home games at Franklin Field adjacent to the university's campus in Philadelphia, Pennsylvania.

== Schedule ==
Date	Opponent	Site	Result	Attendance	Source
September 28	No. 19 Penn State*	Franklin Field; Philadelphia, PA	L 14–19	23,000	
October 5	Dartmouth	Franklin Field; Philadelphia, PA	L 3–6	13,966	
October 12	at Princeton	Palmer Stadium; Princeton, NJ (rivalry)	L 9–13	26,000	
October 19	at Brown	Brown Stadium; Providence, RI	L 7–20	8,000	
October 26	No. 16 Navy*	Franklin Field; Philadelphia, PA	L 7–35	26,495	
November 2	Harvard	Franklin Field; Philadelphia, PA (rivalry)	L 6–13	16,381	
November 9	Yale	Franklin Field; Philadelphia, PA	W 33–20	15,319	
November 16	at Columbia	Baker Field; New York, NY	W 28–6	12,000	
November 28	Cornell	Franklin Field; Philadelphia, PA (rivalry)	W 14–6	19,860	
*Non-conference game; Rankings from AP Poll released prior to the game
