= Bobby Gordon (American football) =

American football player (1935–1990)

No. 47
- Position: Defensive back

Personal information
- Born: December 7, 1935; Pulaski, Tennessee, U.S.
- Died: August 16, 1990 (aged 54); Knoxville, Tennessee, U.S.
- Listed height: 6 ft 0 in (1.83 m)
- Listed weight: 195 lb (88 kg)

Career information
- High school: Giles County (Pulaski)
- College: Tennessee (1954–1957)
- NFL draft: 1958: 6th round, 63rd overall pick

Career history
- Chicago Cardinals (1958); Houston Oilers (1960)

Awards and highlights
- AFL champion (1960); First-team All-SEC (1957)

Career NFL/AFL statistics
- Punts: 55
- Punting yards: 2,089
- Longest punt: 66
- Interceptions: 5
- Fumble recoveries: 2
- Stats at Pro Football Reference

Bobby Lee Gordon (December 7, 1935 – August 16, 1990) was an American professional football player who was a defensive back for the Houston Oilers of the American Football League (AFL) and the Chicago Cardinals of the National Football League (NFL). He was selected by the Cardinals in the sixth round of the 1958 NFL draft after playing college football for the Tennessee Volunteers.

== Early life ==
Bobby Lee Gordon was born on December 7, 1935, in Pulaski, Tennessee. He attended Giles County High School in Pulaski.

== College career ==
Gordon was a member of the Volunteers of the University of Tennessee from 1954 to 1957 and a three-year letterman from 1955 to 1957. He rushed 47 times for 254 yards and two touchdowns in 1955 while also completing five of 18 passes (27.8%) for 120 yards and three touchdowns. He recorded 53 rushing attempts for 202 yards in 1956. In 1957, Gordon totaled 167 carrries for 526 yards and seven touchdowns, and 20 completions on 40 passing attempts (50.0%) for 260 yards, two touchdowns, and seven interceptions. His 167 carries were the most in the Southeastern Conference (SEC) that season. He earned Associated Press and United Press first-team All-SEC honors in 1957. He was named Tennessee's MVP of the 1957 Gator Bowl.

== Professional career ==
Gordon was selected by the Chicago Cardinals in the sixth round, with the 63rd overall pick, of the 1958 NFL draft. He started all 12 games for the Cardinals in 1958, recording 55 punts for 2,089 yards (38.0 average), two interceptions, two fumble recoveries, two rushes for ten yards, and one kick return for 12 yards. The Cardinals finished the season with a 2–9–1 record. He was released in 1959.

Gordon signed with the Houston Oilers of the American Football League (AFL) on September 14, 1960. He appeared in 13 games, starting 11, for the Oilers during the team's inaugural 1960 season, totaling three interceptions and one sack. He also started for the Oilers in the AFL's first-ever championship game, recording one interception for 27 yards and one sack in the 24—16 victory. Gordon was released in 1961.

== Post-playing career ==
Gordon was a football coach at several Knoxville, Tennessee high schools in the 1960s. He later worked as a salesman. He died in a house fire on August 16, 1990, in Knoxville.
