= 1957 LSU Tigers football team =

American college football season

1957 LSU Tigers football
- Conference: Southeastern Conference
- Record: 5–5 (4–4 SEC)
- Head coach: Paul Dietzel (3rd season)
- Home stadium: Tiger Stadium

1957 Southeastern Conference football standings
	Conf.					Overall
Team	W		L		T	W		L		T
No. 1 Auburn $	7	–	0	–	0	10	–	0	–	0
No. 7 Ole Miss	5	–	0	–	1	9	–	1	–	1
No. 14 Mississippi State	4	–	2	–	1	6	–	2	–	1
No. 17 Florida	4	–	2	–	1	6	–	2	–	1
No. 13 Tennessee	4	–	3	–	0	8	–	3	–	0
Vanderbilt	3	–	3	–	1	5	–	3	–	2
LSU	4	–	4	–	0	5	–	5	–	0
Georgia Tech	3	–	4	–	1	4	–	4	–	2
Georgia	3	–	4	–	0	3	–	7	–	0
Tulane	1	–	5	–	0	2	–	8	–	0
Alabama	1	–	6	–	1	2	–	7	–	1
Kentucky	1	–	7	–	0	3	–	7	–	0
$ – Conference champion; Rankings from AP Poll

The 1957 LSU Tigers football team was an American football team that represented Louisiana State University (LSU) as a member of the Southeastern Conference (SEC) during the 1957 college football season. In their third year under head coach Paul Dietzel, the Tigers compiled an overall record of 5–5, with a conference record of 4–4, and finished seventh in the SEC.

== Schedule ==
Date	Opponent	Rank	Site	Result	Attendance	Source
September 21	Rice*		Tiger Stadium; Baton Rouge, LA	L 14–20	50,912	
September 28	Alabama		Tiger Stadium; Baton Rouge, LA (rivalry)	W 28–0	33,728	
October 5	at Texas Tech*		Clifford B. and Audrey Jones Stadium; Lubbock, TX	W 19–14	16,000–19,278	
October 12	No. 17 Georgia Tech		Tiger Stadium; Baton Rouge, LA	W 20–13	59,476	
October 19	Kentucky^{†}	No. 17	Tiger Stadium; Baton Rouge, LA	W 21–0	53,824	
October 26	at Florida	No. 10	Florida Field; Gainesville, FL (rivalry)	L 14–22	27,740	
November 2	at Vanderbilt		Dudley Field; Nashville, TN	L 0–7	18,500	
November 9	No. 14 Ole Miss		Hemingway Stadium; Oxford, MS (rivalry)	L 12–14	26,261	
November 16	No. 12 Mississippi State		Tiger Stadium; Baton Rouge, LA (rivalry)	L 6–14	51,213	
November 30	Tulane		Tiger Stadium; Baton Rouge, LA (Battle for the Rag)	W 25–6	48,040	
*Non-conference game; ^{†}Homecoming; Rankings from AP Poll released prior to the game
