= List of college football teams by weekly appearances atop AP poll =

This is a list of college football teams by the number of weeks they have been ranked number one in the AP poll since its inception in 1936 through November 15, 2026.

Rank	Team	Weeks	First appearance	Most recent appearance
1	Alabama	141	1961	2024
2	Ohio State	122	1942	2026
3	Oklahoma	101	1950	2011
4	Notre Dame	98	1938	2012
5	USC	91	1939	2012
6	Florida State	72	1988	2014
7	Miami (FL)	71	1983	2026
8	Nebraska	70	1965	2000
9	**Georgia**	**57**	**1942**	**2026**
10	Texas	54	1941	2026
11	Florida	41	1985	2009
12	LSU	38	1958	2019
13	Michigan	36	1947	2024
14	Michigan State	29	1951	1966
15	Army	27	1944	1958
16	Clemson	25	1981	2020
17	Penn State	21	1978	1997
17	Pittsburgh	21	1937	1982
19	Minnesota	18	1936	1960
19	Tennessee	18	1939	1998
21	Oregon	16	2010	2024
22	Washington	15	1982	1992
23	Iowa	11	1960	1985
24	Auburn	9	1957	2010
25	Colorado	7	1989	1990
25	Syracuse	7	1959	1960
25	Texas A&M	7	1939	1957
25	UCLA	7	1954	1988
29	Maryland	6	1953	1955
30	Mississippi State	5	2014	2014
30	Northwestern	5	1936	1962
30	Ole Miss	5	1960	1964
30	Purdue	5	1968	1968
34	BYU	4	1984	1984
34	California	4	1937	1951
34	Cornell†	4	1940	1940
37	Virginia	3	1990	1990
38	Indiana	2	2025	2026
38	Missouri	2	1960	2007
38	SMU	2	1950	1950
38	TCU	2	1938	1938
42	Arkansas	1	1965	1965
42	Boston College	1	1942	1942
42	North Carolina	1	1948	1948
42	Wisconsin	1	1952	1952

† No longer a FBS school.
Bold: Team ranked number one in most recent poll.

== See also ==
- List of NCAA college football rankings
- Coaches' Poll
- College football national championships in NCAA Division I FBS
- Mythical national championship
