= Jerry Wilson (defensive end) =

American football player (1936–2015)

No. 88, 82, 76
- Position: Defensive end

Personal information
- Born: December 9, 1936; Birmingham, Alabama, U. S.
- Died: March 5, 2015 (aged 78); Birmingham, Alabama, U. S.
- Listed height: 6 ft 3 in (1.91 m)
- Listed weight: 238 lb (108 kg)

Career information
- High school: Phillips
- College: Auburn
- NFL draft: 1959: 2nd round, 14th overall pick

Career history

Playing
- Philadelphia Eagles (1959–1960); San Francisco 49ers (1960); Boston Patriots (1962)*; Toronto Argonauts (1962–1964)
- * Offseason or practice squad member only

Coaching
- Atlanta Spartans (1964) Assistant coach

Awards and highlights
- NFL champion (1960); National champion (1957); Third-team All-American (1958); 2× First-team All-SEC (1957, 1958); Alabama Sports Hall of Fame (2008)

Career NFL statistics
- Fumble recoveries: 2
- Stats at Pro Football Reference

Gerald Roscoe Wilson (December 9, 1936 – March 5, 2015) was an American professional football player who was a defensive end for the Philadelphia Eagles (1959–1960) and San Francisco 49ers (1960) of the National Football League (NFL). He also played for the Toronto Argonauts (1962–1964). Wilson played college football for the Auburn Tigers, helping them win an NCAA national championship. He graduated from Phillips High in Birmingham, Alabama.

== NFL career ==
Wilson was selected in the second round of the 1959 NFL draft by the Chicago Cardinals. Before entering a regular season game, he was traded to the Philadelphia Eagles on September 4, 1959, for Jerry Norton. Included in the deal to the Eagles was Bob Konovsky. Midway through the 1960 season, Wilson was traded to the San Francisco 49ers.

== Post-NFL ==
In 1961, Wilson was called to active duty for overseas duty in the Air National Guard. He returned in 1962 to play two years with the Toronto Argonauts of the Canadian Football League.
