= 1957 Mississippi State Maroons football team =

American college football season

1957 Mississippi State Maroons football
- Conference: Southeastern Conference

Ranking
- AP: No. 14
- Record: 6–2–1 (4–2–1 SEC)
- Head coach: Wade Walker (2nd season)
- Home stadium: Scott Field; Mississippi Veterans Memorial Stadium

1957 Southeastern Conference football standings
	Conf.					Overall
Team	W		L		T	W		L		T
No. 1 Auburn $	7	–	0	–	0	10	–	0	–	0
No. 7 Ole Miss	5	–	0	–	1	9	–	1	–	1
No. 14 Mississippi State	4	–	2	–	1	6	–	2	–	1
No. 17 Florida	4	–	2	–	1	6	–	2	–	1
No. 13 Tennessee	4	–	3	–	0	8	–	3	–	0
Vanderbilt	3	–	3	–	1	5	–	3	–	2
LSU	4	–	4	–	0	5	–	5	–	0
Georgia Tech	3	–	4	–	1	4	–	4	–	2
Georgia	3	–	4	–	0	3	–	7	–	0
Tulane	1	–	5	–	0	2	–	8	–	0
Alabama	1	–	6	–	1	2	–	7	–	1
Kentucky	1	–	7	–	0	3	–	7	–	0
$ – Conference champion; Rankings from AP Poll

The 1957 Mississippi State Maroons football team was an American football team that represented Mississippi State College (now known as Mississippi State University) as a member of the Southeastern Conference (SEC) during the 1957 college football season. In their second year under head coach Wade Walker, the team compiled an overall record of 6–2–1, with a mark of 4–2–1 in conference play, and finished third in the SEC.

The Maroons finished the season ranked in the AP Poll for the first time since 1942 and would not finish another season ranked until 1974. Head coach Wade Walker was named SEC Coach of the Year.

== Schedule ==
Date	Opponent	Rank	Site	Result	Attendance	Source
September 28	Memphis State*		Scott Field; Starkville, MS	W 10–6		
October 5	at Tennessee		Shields–Watkins Field; Knoxville, TN	L 9–14	25,000	
October 12	Arkansas State*		Scott Field; Starkville, MS	W 47–13	12,000	
October 19	at Florida		Florida Field; Gainesville, FL	W 29–20	40,000	
October 26	at Alabama		Denny Stadium; Tuscaloosa, AL (rivalry)	W 25–13	28,000	
November 2	Tulane		Mississippi Veterans Memorial Stadium; Jackson, MS	W 27–6	27,000	
November 9	at No. 3 Auburn	No. 17	Legion Field; Birmingham, AL	L 7–15	43,000	
November 16	at LSU	No. 12	Tiger Stadium; Baton Rouge, LA (rivalry)	W 14–6	53,000	
November 30	No. 7 Ole Miss	No. 13	Scott Field; Starkville, MS (Egg Bowl)	T 7–7	35,000	
*Non-conference game; Rankings from AP Poll released prior to the game
