= 1957 Tulane Green Wave football team =

American college football season

1957 Tulane Green Wave football
- Conference: Southeastern Conference
- Record: 2–8 (1–5 SEC)
- Head coach: Andy Pilney (4th season)
- Home stadium: Tulane Stadium

1957 Southeastern Conference football standings
	Conf.					Overall
Team	W		L		T	W		L		T
No. 1 Auburn $	7	–	0	–	0	10	–	0	–	0
No. 7 Ole Miss	5	–	0	–	1	9	–	1	–	1
No. 14 Mississippi State	4	–	2	–	1	6	–	2	–	1
No. 17 Florida	4	–	2	–	1	6	–	2	–	1
No. 13 Tennessee	4	–	3	–	0	8	–	3	–	0
Vanderbilt	3	–	3	–	1	5	–	3	–	2
LSU	4	–	4	–	0	5	–	5	–	0
Georgia Tech	3	–	4	–	1	4	–	4	–	2
Georgia	3	–	4	–	0	3	–	7	–	0
Tulane	1	–	5	–	0	2	–	8	–	0
Alabama	1	–	6	–	1	2	–	7	–	1
Kentucky	1	–	7	–	0	3	–	7	–	0
$ – Conference champion; Rankings from AP Poll

The 1957 Tulane Green Wave football team was an American football team that represented Tulane University during the 1957 college football season as a member of the Southeastern Conference (SEC). In their fourth year under head coach Andy Pilney, the team compiled a 2–8 record (1–5 in conference games), finished in tenth place in the SEC, and was outscored by a total of 195 to 91.

The team gained an average of 157.5 rushing yards and 68.9 passing yards per game. On defense, it gave up an average of 241.2 rushing yards and 41.2 passing yards per game. Tulane's individual leaders included Carlton Sweeney with 306 passing yards and Claude Mason with 338 rushing yards and 132 receiving yards.

The Green Wave played its home games at Tulane Stadium in New Orleans.

== Schedule ==
Date	Opponent	Site	Result	Attendance	Source
September 20	VPI*	Tulane Stadium; New Orleans, LA	L 13–14	32,000	
September 28	at No. 13 Texas*	Memorial Stadium; Austin, TX	L 6–20	35,000	
October 5	at Marquette*	Marquette Stadium; Milwaukee, WI	W 20–6	12,500	
October 11	Georgia	Tulane Stadium; New Orleans, LA	L 6–13	30,000	
October 18	No. 11 Ole Miss	Tulane Stadium; New Orleans, LA (rivalry)	L 0–50	30,000	
October 26	Georgia Tech	Tulane Stadium; New Orleans, LA	L 13–20	25,000	
November 2	vs. Mississippi State	Mississippi Veterans Memorial Stadium; Jackson, MS	L 6–27	27,000	
November 9	vs. Alabama	Ladd Memorial Stadium; Mobile, AL	W 7–0	15,000	
November 16	at No. 10 Army*	Michie Stadium; West Point, NY	L 14–20	21,000–21,125	
November 30	at LSU	Tiger Stadium; Baton Rouge, LA (Battle for the Rag)	L 6–25	48,040	
*Non-conference game; Rankings from AP Poll released prior to the game
