= 1957 Georgia Tech Yellow Jackets football team =

American college football season

1957 Georgia Tech Yellow Jackets football
- Conference: Southeastern Conference
- Record: 4–4–2 (3–4–1 SEC)
- Head coach: Bobby Dodd (13th season)
- Captain: Don Stephenson
- Home stadium: Grant Field

1957 Southeastern Conference football standings
	Conf.					Overall
Team	W		L		T	W		L		T
No. 1 Auburn $	7	–	0	–	0	10	–	0	–	0
No. 7 Ole Miss	5	–	0	–	1	9	–	1	–	1
No. 14 Mississippi State	4	–	2	–	1	6	–	2	–	1
No. 17 Florida	4	–	2	–	1	6	–	2	–	1
No. 13 Tennessee	4	–	3	–	0	8	–	3	–	0
Vanderbilt	3	–	3	–	1	5	–	3	–	2
LSU	4	–	4	–	0	5	–	5	–	0
Georgia Tech	3	–	4	–	1	4	–	4	–	2
Georgia	3	–	4	–	0	3	–	7	–	0
Tulane	1	–	5	–	0	2	–	8	–	0
Alabama	1	–	6	–	1	2	–	7	–	1
Kentucky	1	–	7	–	0	3	–	7	–	0
$ – Conference champion; Rankings from AP Poll

The 1957 Georgia Tech Yellow Jackets football team represented the Georgia Institute of Technology during the 1957 college football season. The Yellow Jackets were led by 13th-year head coach Bobby Dodd and played their home games at Grant Field in Atlanta.

The team's statistical leaders included Fred Braselton with 486 passing yards and Lester Simerville with 275 rushing yards.

== Schedule ==
Date	Opponent	Rank	Site	Result	Attendance	Source
September 21	No. 20 Kentucky	No. 11	Grant Field; Atlanta, GA	W 13–0	40,000	
September 28	No. 15 SMU*	No. 3	Grant Field; Atlanta, GA	T 0–0	30,000	
October 12	at LSU	No. 17	Tiger Stadium; Baton Rouge, LA	L 13–20	62,500	
October 19	No. 9 Auburn		Grant Field; Atlanta, GA (rivalry)	L 0–3	40,000	
October 26	at Tulane		Tulane Stadium; New Orleans, LA	W 20–13	25,000	
November 2	No. 7 Duke*^{†}		Grant Field; Atlanta, GA	W 13–0	40,000	
November 9	at No. 9 Tennessee	No. 18	Shields–Watkins Field; Knoxville, TN (rivalry)	L 6–21	45,500	
November 16	at Alabama		Legion Field; Birmingham, AL (rivalry)	W 10–7	30,000	
November 23	Florida		Grant Field; Atlanta, GA	T 0–0	40,000	
November 30	Georgia		Grant Field; Atlanta, GA (rivalry)	L 0–7	40,000	
*Non-conference game; ^{†}Homecoming; Rankings from AP Poll released prior to the game
