= 1957 Georgia Bulldogs football team =

American college football season

1957 Georgia Bulldogs football
- Conference: Southeastern Conference
- Record: 3–7 (3–4 SEC)
- Head coach: Wally Butts (19th season)
- Home stadium: Sanford Stadium

1957 Southeastern Conference football standings
	Conf.					Overall
Team	W		L		T	W		L		T
No. 1 Auburn $	7	–	0	–	0	10	–	0	–	0
No. 7 Ole Miss	5	–	0	–	1	9	–	1	–	1
No. 14 Mississippi State	4	–	2	–	1	6	–	2	–	1
No. 17 Florida	4	–	2	–	1	6	–	2	–	1
No. 13 Tennessee	4	–	3	–	0	8	–	3	–	0
Vanderbilt	3	–	3	–	1	5	–	3	–	2
LSU	4	–	4	–	0	5	–	5	–	0
Georgia Tech	3	–	4	–	1	4	–	4	–	2
Georgia	3	–	4	–	0	3	–	7	–	0
Tulane	1	–	5	–	0	2	–	8	–	0
Alabama	1	–	6	–	1	2	–	7	–	1
Kentucky	1	–	7	–	0	3	–	7	–	0
$ – Conference champion; Rankings from AP Poll

The 1957 Georgia Bulldogs football team represented the University of Georgia as a member of the Southeastern Conference (SEC) during the 1957 college football season. Led by 19th-year head coach Wally Butts, the Bulldogs compiled an overall record of 3–7 with a mark of 3–4 in conference play, placing ninth in the SEC.

== Schedule ==
Date	Opponent	Site	Result	Attendance	Source
September 21	vs. Texas*	Grant Field; Atlanta, GA	L 7–26	33,000	
September 28	Vanderbilt	Sanford Stadium; Athens, GA (rivalry)	L 6–9	19,000	
October 5	at No. 10 Michigan*	Michigan Stadium; Ann Arbor, MI	L 0–26	85,002	
October 11	at Tulane	Tulane Stadium; New Orleans, LA	W 13–6	30,000	
October 19	vs. No. 15 Navy*	Foreman Field; Norfolk, VA (Oyster Bowl)	L 14–27	31,160	
October 27	at Kentucky	McLean Stadium; Lexington, KY	W 33–14	25,000	
November 2	Alabama^{†}	Sanford Stadium; Athens, GA (rivalry)	L 13–14	30,000	
November 9	vs. Florida	Gator Bowl Stadium; Jacksonville, FL (rivalry)	L 0–22	41,000	
November 16	vs. No. 3 Auburn	Memorial Stadium; Columbus, GA (rivalry)	L 0–6		
November 30	at Georgia Tech	Grant Field; Atlanta, GA (rivalry)	W 7–0	40,000	
*Non-conference game; ^{†}Homecoming; Rankings from AP Poll released prior to the game

== Roster ==
- E Ken Cooper
- FB Theron Sapp
- LE Jimmy Vickers
- Quinton Smith
- Gordon Kelly
- LT Riley Gunnels
- LG Cicero Lucas
- C Dave Lloyd
- RG Mike Anderson
- RT Pat Dye
- QB Charley Britt
- LH Carl Manning
- Gene Littleton
- George Guisler
- RH Jimmy Orr
