= 1957 Cornell Big Red football team =

American college football season

1957 Cornell Big Red football
- Conference: Ivy League
- Record: 3–6 (3–4 Ivy)
- Head coach: George K. James (11th season)
- Captain: Gerald Knapp
- Home stadium: Schoellkopf Field

1957 Ivy League football standings
	Conf.					Overall
Team	W		L		T	W		L		T
Princeton $	6	–	1	–	0	7	–	2	–	0
Dartmouth	5	–	1	–	1	7	–	1	–	1
Yale	4	–	2	–	1	6	–	2	–	1
Brown	3	–	4	–	0	5	–	4	–	0
Cornell	3	–	4	–	0	3	–	6	–	0
Penn	3	–	4	–	0	3	–	6	–	0
Harvard	2	–	5	–	0	3	–	5	–	0
Columbia	1	–	6	–	0	1	–	8	–	0
$ – Conference champion

The 1957 Cornell Big Red football team was an American football team that represented Cornell University as a member of the Ivy League during the 1957 college football season.

In its 11th season under head coach George K. James, the team compiled a 3–6 record and was outscored 159 to 100. Gerald Knapp was the team captain.

Cornell's 3–4 conference record tied for fourth place in the Ivy League. The Big Red were outscored 111 to 87 by Ivy opponents.

Cornell played its home games at Schoellkopf Field in Ithaca, New York.

== Schedule ==
Date	Opponent	Site	Result	Attendance	Source
September 28	Colgate*	Schoellkopf Field; Ithaca, NY (rivalry)	L 13–14	13,000	
October 5	at Harvard	Harvard Stadium; Boston, MA	W 20–6	13,000	
October 12	Syracuse*	Schoellkopf Field; Ithaca, NY	L 0–34	25,000	
October 19	Yale	Schoellkopf Field; Ithaca, NY	L 7–18	8,000	
October 26	at Princeton	Palmer Stadium; Princeton, NJ	L 14–47	25,000	
November 2	Columbia	Schoellkopf Field; Ithaca, NY (rivalry)	W 8–0	10,000	
November 9	Brown	Schoellkopf Field; Ithaca, NY	W 13–6	11,000	
November 16	at Dartmouth	Memorial Field; Hanover, NH (rivalry)	L 19–20	13,000	
November 28	at Penn	Franklin Field; Philadelphia, PA (rivalry)	L 6–14	19,860	
*Non-conference game
