= 1957 Florida Gators football team =

American college football season

1957 Florida Gators football
- Conference: Southeastern Conference

Ranking
- AP: No. 17
- Record: 6–2–1 (4–2–1 SEC)
- Head coach: Bob Woodruff (8th season)
- Home stadium: Florida Field

1957 Southeastern Conference football standings
	Conf.					Overall
Team	W		L		T	W		L		T
No. 1 Auburn $	7	–	0	–	0	10	–	0	–	0
No. 7 Ole Miss	5	–	0	–	1	9	–	1	–	1
No. 14 Mississippi State	4	–	2	–	1	6	–	2	–	1
No. 17 Florida	4	–	2	–	1	6	–	2	–	1
No. 13 Tennessee	4	–	3	–	0	8	–	3	–	0
Vanderbilt	3	–	3	–	1	5	–	3	–	2
LSU	4	–	4	–	0	5	–	5	–	0
Georgia Tech	3	–	4	–	1	4	–	4	–	2
Georgia	3	–	4	–	0	3	–	7	–	0
Tulane	1	–	5	–	0	2	–	8	–	0
Alabama	1	–	6	–	1	2	–	7	–	1
Kentucky	1	–	7	–	0	3	–	7	–	0
$ – Conference champion; Rankings from AP Poll

The 1957 Florida Gators football team represented the University of Florida during the 1957 college football season. The season was Bob Woodruff's eighth as the head coach of the Florida Gators football team. Woodruff's 1957 Florida Gators finished their abbreviated season with an overall record of 6–2–1 and a Southeastern Conference (SEC) record of 4–2–1, tying for third place among the twelve SEC teams.

== Before the season ==
The 1957 season was the last time the Gators played only nine games in a season. Ten games were scheduled, but the season opener against the UCLA Bruins was canceled when most of the Gators team members were suffering from a serious bout of influenza. The Gators were led by quarterback Jimmy Dunn, and two-way halfbacks Bernie Parrish and Jim Rountree.

== Schedule ==
Date	Opponent	Rank	Site	Result	Attendance	Source
September 28	Wake Forest*		Florida Field; Gainesville, FL	W 27–0	28,000	
October 5	at Kentucky		McLean Stadium; Lexington, KY (rivalry)	W 14–7	33,000	
October 19	Mississippi State^{†}		Florida Field; Gainesville, FL	L 20–29	40,000	
October 26	No. 10 LSU		Florida Field; Gainesville, FL (rivalry)	W 22–14	28,000	
November 2	at No. 4 Auburn	No. 19	Cliff Hare Stadium; Auburn, AL (rivalry)	L 0–13	36,000	
November 9	vs. Georgia		Gator Bowl Stadium; Jacksonville, FL (rivalry)	W 22–0	41,000	
November 16	Vanderbilt		Florida Field; Gainesville, FL	W 14–7	28,000	
November 23	at Georgia Tech		Grant Field; Atlanta, GA	T 0–0	40,000	
November 30	at Miami (FL)*	No. 20	Burdine Stadium; Miami, FL (rivalry)	W 14–0	59,507	
*Non-conference game; ^{†}Homecoming; Rankings from AP Poll released prior to the game

== Roster ==
- QB Jimmy Dunn, Jr.

== Game summaries ==
=== Wake Forest ===
Florida won a 27–0 home-opener victory over the Wake Forest Demon Deacons.

=== Kentucky ===
The second week of play was a 14–7 conference win over the Kentucky Wildcats.

=== Mississippi State ===
Florida lost at homecoming to Mississippi State 29–20.

=== LSU ===
The Gators upset Billy Cannon and his 10th-ranked LSU Tigers 22–14.

=== Auburn ===
The Gators were shut out 13–0 by coach Ralph Jordan's national champion Auburn Tigers. When the two teams met in Cliff Hare Stadium in Auburn, it was the first game between the rivals in which both teams were ranked in the top twenty of the AP Poll. Woodruff's Gators featured their usual strong defense, but the Tigers defense was even better.

=== Georgia ===
Florida beat the Georgia Bulldogs 22–0.

=== Vanderbilt ===
Parrish was named AP "Back of the Week" for his performance in the 14–7 win over Vanderbilt. This included rushing for 111 yards, scoring both touchdowns, kicking both extra points, catching an interception, and making seven tackles—including one to prevent the Commodores' tying score.

=== Georgia Tech ===
Georgia Tech and Florida fought to a scoreless tie.

=== Miami (FL) ===
Florida had a road win over the in-state rival Miami Hurricanes, 14–0 in Miami, Florida.

== Postseason ==
At the end of the season, the Gators finished in the top twenty of the final AP Poll for only the second time in their history,'
