= 1957 Yale Bulldogs football team =

American college football season

1957 Yale Bulldogs football
- Conference: Ivy League
- Record: 6–2–1 (4–2–1 Ivy)
- Head coach: Jordan Olivar (6th season)
- Captain: John Embersits
- Home stadium: Yale Bowl

1957 Ivy League football standings
	Conf.					Overall
Team	W		L		T	W		L		T
Princeton $	6	–	1	–	0	7	–	2	–	0
Dartmouth	5	–	1	–	1	7	–	1	–	1
Yale	4	–	2	–	1	6	–	2	–	1
Brown	3	–	4	–	0	5	–	4	–	0
Cornell	3	–	4	–	0	3	–	6	–	0
Penn	3	–	4	–	0	3	–	6	–	0
Harvard	2	–	5	–	0	3	–	5	–	0
Columbia	1	–	6	–	0	1	–	8	–	0
$ – Conference champion

The 1957 Yale Bulldogs football team represented Yale University in the 1957 college football season. The Bulldogs were led by sixth-year head coach Jordan Olivar, played their home games at the Yale Bowl and finished the season with a 6–2–1 record.

== Schedule ==
Date	Opponent	Site	Result	Attendance	Source
September 28	Connecticut*	Yale Bowl; New Haven, CT	W 27–0	24,196	
October 5	Brown	Yale Bowl; New Haven, CT	L 20–21	31,789	
October 12	Columbia	Yale Bowl; New Haven, CT	W 19–0	19,285	
October 19	at Cornell	Schoellkopf Field; Ithaca, NY	W 18–7	8,000	
October 26	Colgate*	Yale Bowl; New Haven, CT	W 20–0	36,564	
November 2	No. 20 Dartmouth	Yale Bowl; New Haven, CT	T 14–14	47,360	
November 9	at Penn	Franklin Field; Philadelphia, PA	L 14–12	15,319	
November 16	at Princeton	Palmer Stadium; Princeton, NJ (rivalry)	W 20–13	46,000	
November 23	Harvard	Yale Bowl; New Haven, CT (The Game)	W 54–0	55,817	
*Non-conference game; Rankings from AP Poll released prior to the game
