= 1957 Dartmouth Indians football team =

American college football season

1957 Dartmouth Indians football
- Conference: Ivy League
- Record: 7–1–1 (5–1–1 Ivy)
- Head coach: Bob Blackman (2nd season)
- Home stadium: Memorial Field

1957 Ivy League football standings
	Conf.					Overall
Team	W		L		T	W		L		T
Princeton $	6	–	1	–	0	7	–	2	–	0
Dartmouth	5	–	1	–	1	7	–	1	–	1
Yale	4	–	2	–	1	6	–	2	–	1
Brown	3	–	4	–	0	5	–	4	–	0
Cornell	3	–	4	–	0	3	–	6	–	0
Penn	3	–	4	–	0	3	–	6	–	0
Harvard	2	–	5	–	0	3	–	5	–	0
Columbia	1	–	6	–	0	1	–	8	–	0
$ – Conference champion

The 1957 Dartmouth Indians football team represented Dartmouth College during the 1957 college football season.

== Schedule ==
Date	Opponent	Rank	Site	Result	Attendance	Source
September 28	New Hampshire*		Memorial Field; Hanover, NH (rivalry)	W 27–0	11,800	
October 5	at Penn		Franklin Field; Philadelphia, PA	W 6–3	13,966	
October 12	Brown		Memorial Field; Hanover, NH	W 35–0	13,500	
October 19	at Holy Cross*		Fitton Field; Worcester, MA	W 14–7	19,000	
October 26	at Harvard		Harvard Stadium; Boston, MA (rivalry)	W 26–0	30,000	
November 2	at Yale	No. 20	Yale Bowl; New Haven, CT	T 14–14	47,360	
November 9	at Columbia		Baker Field; New York, NY	W 7–0	13,000	
November 16	Cornell		Memorial Field; Hanover, NH (rivalry)	W 20–19	13,000	
November 23	at Princeton		Palmer Stadium; Princeton, NJ	L 14–34	46,000	
*Non-conference game; Rankings from AP Poll released prior to the game
