= Jerry Norton =

American football player (1931–2020)

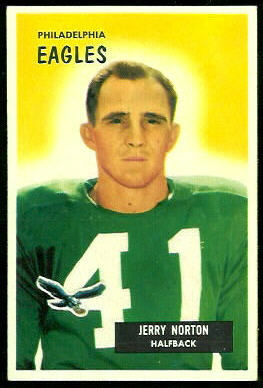
- Norton on a 1955 Bowman football card

No. 41, 25, 23
- Positions: Safety, punter

Personal information
- Born: May 16, 1931; Gilmer, Texas, U.S.
- Died: January 14, 2020 (aged 88); Dallas, Texas, U.S.
- Listed height: 5 ft 11 in (1.80 m)
- Listed weight: 195 lb (88 kg)

Career information
- High school: Texarkana (TX) Texas
- College: SMU (1950–1953)
- NFL draft: 1954: 7th round, 81st overall pick

Career history
- Philadelphia Eagles (1954–1958); Chicago/St. Louis Cardinals (1959–1961); Dallas Cowboys (1962); Green Bay Packers (1963–1964)

Awards and highlights
- First-team All-Pro (1960); 5× Pro Bowl (1957–1961); NFL interceptions co-leader (1960); NFL record: Most passes intercepted in a single game: 4 (twice, tied)

Career NFL statistics
- Games played: 131
- Interceptions: 35
- Touchdowns: 8
- Stats at Pro Football Reference

Jerry Ray Norton (May 16, 1931 – January 14, 2020) was an American professional football safety and punter in the National Football League (NFL) for the Philadelphia Eagles, Chicago/St. Louis Cardinals, Dallas Cowboys and Green Bay Packers. He was selected to five Pro Bowls. He played college football at Southern Methodist University.

== Early life ==
Norton attended Texas High School in Texarkana, Texas, where he played football and basketball. He was named All-state in both sports. In football, he was a two-way player as a running back and defensive back. As a senior, he was selected to participate in both sports All-star games, but only chose basketball, because it was the invitation that arrived first.

== College career ==
He accepted a scholarship from Southern Methodist University, where he led the team in rushing as a sophomore (438 yards). As a junior, he led the team in passing and rushing (383 yards). He was also one of the nation's top punters. He played only on offense in 1952.

In 2007, he was inducted into the Texas High School Football Hall of Fame. Jerry Norton died on January 14, 2020, in Dallas, Texas. He was 88 years old.

== Professional career ==
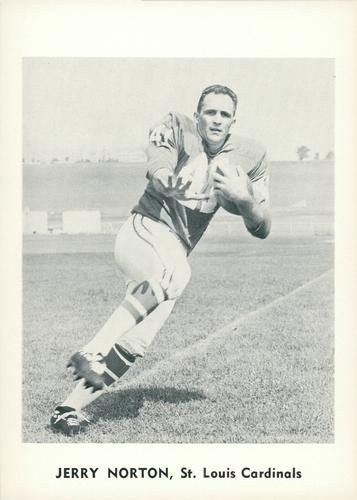
Norton with the Cardinals in 1961

=== Philadelphia Eagles ===
Norton was selected in the seventh round (81st overall) of the 1954 NFL draft. As a rookie, he played safety and finished with 5 interceptions.

In 1955, he played as a running back, registering 36 carries for 144 yards (4.0 average). In 1958, he only played in 9 games after suffering a broken jaw in a loss against the Pittsburgh Steelers. That season, he started to have confrontations with the Eagles front office because of his salary demands, so on September 4, 1959, he was traded to the Chicago Cardinals in exchange for offensive guard Bob Konovsky and defensive end Jerry Wilson.

=== Chicago / St. Louis Cardinals ===
Norton was named the Cardinals starting Safety and punter. In 1960, he led the league with 10 interceptions and a 45.6 yards punt average. The next year, he ranked fifth in the NFL with 7 interceptions. He is the only player in league history to twice intercept four passes in a game (1960 and 1961). On November 26, 1961, he returned two interceptions for touchdowns and 109 yards against the Pittsburgh Steelers.

On December 14, 1961, he notified the team of his intentions to retire, but the Dallas Cowboys eventually convinced him to play in his home state.

During the 1962 offseason, he was traded to the Cowboys in a three-team deal. The Baltimore Colts sent a third round draft pick (#33-Mike Fracchia) to the Cardinals and the Cowboys sent tight end/placekicker Dick Bielski to the Colts.

=== Dallas Cowboys ===
In 1962, he was named the starter at strong safety for the Dallas Cowboys. In week 13 against the St. Louis Cardinals, he returned 94 yards the first attempted field goal for a touchdown in franchise history. On September 10, 1963, he was traded to the Green Bay Packers in exchange for a sixth round draft choice (#83-Jim Evans).

=== Green Bay Packers ===
Norton spent his last two years with the Green Bay Packers, where he was only used as a punter.
