= 1957 Vanderbilt Commodores football team =

American college football season

1957 Vanderbilt Commodores football
- Conference: Southeastern Conference
- Record: 5–3–2 (3–3–1 SEC)
- Head coach: Art Guepe (5th season)
- Home stadium: Dudley Field

1957 Southeastern Conference football standings
	Conf.					Overall
Team	W		L		T	W		L		T
No. 1 Auburn $	7	–	0	–	0	10	–	0	–	0
No. 7 Ole Miss	5	–	0	–	1	9	–	1	–	1
No. 14 Mississippi State	4	–	2	–	1	6	–	2	–	1
No. 17 Florida	4	–	2	–	1	6	–	2	–	1
No. 13 Tennessee	4	–	3	–	0	8	–	3	–	0
Vanderbilt	3	–	3	–	1	5	–	3	–	2
LSU	4	–	4	–	0	5	–	5	–	0
Georgia Tech	3	–	4	–	1	4	–	4	–	2
Georgia	3	–	4	–	0	3	–	7	–	0
Tulane	1	–	5	–	0	2	–	8	–	0
Alabama	1	–	6	–	1	2	–	7	–	1
Kentucky	1	–	7	–	0	3	–	7	–	0
$ – Conference champion; Rankings from AP Poll

The 1957 Vanderbilt Commodores football team represented Vanderbilt University in the 1957 college football season. The Commodores were led by head coach Art Guepe in his fifth season and finished the season with a record of five wins, three losses and one tie (5–3–2 overall, 3–3–1 in the SEC).

== Schedule ==
Date	Opponent	Site	Result	Attendance	Source
September 21	Missouri*	Dudley Field; Nashville, TN	T 7–7	18,926	
September 28	at Georgia	Sanford Stadium; Athens, GA (rivalry)	W 9–6	19,000	
October 5	Alabama	Dudley Field; Nashville, TN	T 6–6	24,500	
October 12	No. 14 Ole Miss	Dudley Field; Nashville, TN (rivalry)	L 0–28	24,000	
October 19	at Penn State*	New Beaver Field; University Park, PA	W 32–20	24,200–26,781	
November 2	LSU^{†}	Dudley Field; Nashville, TN	W 7–0	19,522	
November 9	Kentucky	Dudley Field; Nashville, TN (rivalry)	W 12–7	23,429	
November 16	at Florida	Florida Field; Gainesville, FL	L 7–14	28,000	
November 23	The Citadel*	Dudley Field; Nashville, TN	W 27–0	16,000	
November 30	at No. 18 Tennessee	Shields–Watkins Field; Knoxville, TN (rivalry)	L 6–20	38,000	
*Non-conference game; ^{†}Homecoming; Rankings from AP Poll released prior to the game
