= 1957 Princeton Tigers football team =

American college football season

1957 Princeton Tigers football

Ivy League champion
- Conference: Ivy League
- Record: 7–2 (6–1 Ivy)
- Head coach: Dick Colman (1st season)
- Captain: John C. Sapoch Jr.
- Home stadium: Palmer Stadium

1957 Ivy League football standings
	Conf.					Overall
Team	W		L		T	W		L		T
Princeton $	6	–	1	–	0	7	–	2	–	0
Dartmouth	5	–	1	–	1	7	–	1	–	1
Yale	4	–	2	–	1	6	–	2	–	1
Brown	3	–	4	–	0	5	–	4	–	0
Cornell	3	–	4	–	0	3	–	6	–	0
Penn	3	–	4	–	0	3	–	6	–	0
Harvard	2	–	5	–	0	3	–	5	–	0
Columbia	1	–	6	–	0	1	–	8	–	0
$ – Conference champion

The 1957 Princeton Tigers football team was an American football team that represented Princeton University as a member of the Ivy League during the 1957 college football season.

In their first year under head coach Dick Colman, the Tigers won the Ivy League championship, compiling an overall 7–2 record and outscoring opponents 206 to 95. John C. Sapoch Jr. was the team captain.

Princeton's 6–1 conference record was the best in the Ivy League. The Tigers outscored Ivy opponents 189 to 83.

Princeton played its home games at Palmer Stadium on the university campus in Princeton, New Jersey.

== Schedule ==
Date	Opponent	Site	Result	Attendance	Source
September 28	Rutgers*	Palmer Stadium; Princeton, NJ (rivalry)	W 7–0	21,150	
October 5	at Columbia	Baker Field; New York, NY	W 47–6	15,000	
October 12	Penn	Palmer Stadium; Princeton, NJ (rivalry)	W 13–9	26,000	
October 19	Colgate*	Palmer Stadium; Princeton, NJ	L 10–12	25,000	
October 26	Cornell	Palmer Stadium; Princeton, NJ	W 47–14	25,000	
November 2	at Brown	Brown Stadium; Providence, RI	W 7–0	9,000	
November 9	at Harvard	Harvard Stadium; Boston, MA (rivalry)	W 28–20	31,000	
November 16	Yale	Palmer Stadium; Princeton, NJ (rivalry)	L 13–20	46,000	
November 23	Dartmouth	Palmer Stadium; Princeton, NJ	W 34–14	46,000	
*Non-conference game
