= 1957 Tennessee Volunteers football team =

American college football season

1957 Tennessee Volunteers football

Gator Bowl champion

Gator Bowl, W 3–0 vs. Texas A&M
- Conference: Southeastern Conference

Ranking
- Coaches: No. 16
- AP: No. 13
- Record: 8–3 (4–3 SEC)
- Head coach: Bowden Wyatt (3rd season)
- Home stadium: Shields–Watkins Field

1957 Southeastern Conference football standings
	Conf.					Overall
Team	W		L		T	W		L		T
No. 1 Auburn $	7	–	0	–	0	10	–	0	–	0
No. 7 Ole Miss	5	–	0	–	1	9	–	1	–	1
No. 14 Mississippi State	4	–	2	–	1	6	–	2	–	1
No. 17 Florida	4	–	2	–	1	6	–	2	–	1
No. 13 Tennessee	4	–	3	–	0	8	–	3	–	0
Vanderbilt	3	–	3	–	1	5	–	3	–	2
LSU	4	–	4	–	0	5	–	5	–	0
Georgia Tech	3	–	4	–	1	4	–	4	–	2
Georgia	3	–	4	–	0	3	–	7	–	0
Tulane	1	–	5	–	0	2	–	8	–	0
Alabama	1	–	6	–	1	2	–	7	–	1
Kentucky	1	–	7	–	0	3	–	7	–	0
$ – Conference champion; Rankings from AP Poll

The 1957 Tennessee Volunteers (variously Tennessee, UT, or the Vols) represented the University of Tennessee in the 1957 college football season. Playing as a member of the Southeastern Conference (SEC), the team was led by head coach Bowden Wyatt, in his third year, and played their home games at Shields–Watkins Field in Knoxville, Tennessee. They finished the season with a record of eight wins and three losses (8–3 overall, 4–3 in the SEC) and with a victory over Texas A&M in the 1957 Gator Bowl.

== Schedule ==
Date	Opponent	Rank	Site	TV	Result	Attendance	Source
September 28	Auburn	No. 8	Shields–Watkins Field; Knoxville, TN (rivalry)		L 0–7	42,000	
October 5	Mississippi State		Shields–Watkins Field; Knoxville, TN		W 14–9	25,000	
October 12	Chattanooga*	No. 19	Shields–Watkins Field; Knoxville, TN		W 28–13	21,500	
October 19	at Alabama		Legion Field; Birmingham, AL (Third Saturday in October)		W 14–0	32,000	
October 26	at Maryland*		Byrd Stadium; College Park, MD		W 16–0	26,000	
November 2	at North Carolina*	No. 17	Kenan Memorial Stadium; Chapel Hill, NC		W 35–0	34,000	
November 9	No. 18 Georgia Tech^{†}	No. 9	Shields–Watkins Field; Knoxville, TN (rivalry)		W 21–6	45,500	
November 16	vs. No. 8 Ole Miss	No. 7	Crump Stadium; Memphis, TN (rivalry)		L 7–14	31,000	
November 23	at Kentucky	No. 12	McLean Stadium; Lexington, KY (rivalry)		L 6–20	36,500	
November 30	Vanderbilt	No. 18	Shields–Watkins Field; Knoxville, TN (rivalry)		W 20–6	38,000	
December 28	vs. No. 9 Texas A&M*	No. 13	Gator Bowl Stadium; Jacksonville, FL (Gator Bowl)	ABC	W 3–0	43,709	
*Non-conference game; ^{†}Homecoming; Rankings from AP Poll released prior to the game

== Team players drafted into the NFL ==
Player	Position	Round	Pick	NFL club
Bill Anderson	Back	3	31	Washington Redskins
Bobby Gordon	Back	6	63	Chicago Cardinals
Al Carter	Back	22	257	Chicago Bears
Bobby Sandlin	Back	24	285	Baltimore Colts
