= 1957 Brown Bears football team =

American college football season

1957 Brown Bears football
- Conference: Ivy League
- Record: 5–4 (3–4 Ivy)
- Head coach: Alva Kelley (7th season)
- Captain: Gil Robertshaw
- Home stadium: Brown Stadium

1957 Ivy League football standings
| | Conf. | | | | | Overall |
| Team | W | | L | | T | W | | L | | T |
|---|---|---|---|---|---|---|---|---|---|---|
| Princeton $ | 6 | – | 1 | – | 0 | 7 | – | 2 | – | 0 |
| Dartmouth | 5 | – | 1 | – | 1 | 7 | – | 1 | – | 1 |
| Yale | 4 | – | 2 | – | 1 | 6 | – | 2 | – | 1 |
| Brown | 3 | – | 4 | – | 0 | 5 | – | 4 | – | 0 |
| Cornell | 3 | – | 4 | – | 0 | 3 | – | 6 | – | 0 |
| Penn | 3 | – | 4 | – | 0 | 3 | – | 6 | – | 0 |
| Harvard | 2 | – | 5 | – | 0 | 3 | – | 5 | – | 0 |
| Columbia | 1 | – | 6 | – | 0 | 1 | – | 8 | – | 0 |
$ – Conference champion

The 1957 Brown Bears football team was an American football team that represented Brown University as a member of the Ivy League during the 1957 college football season.

In their seventh season under head coach Alva Kelley, the Bears compiled a 5–4 record and outscored opponents 154 to 125. Gil Robertshaw was the team captain.

The Bears' 3–4 conference record tied for fourth in the Ivy League. They were outscored by Ivy opponents, 111 to 100.

Brown played its home games at Brown Stadium in Providence, Rhode Island.

== Schedule ==
| Date | Opponent | Site | Result | Attendance | Source |
|---|---|---|---|---|---|
| September 28 | Columbia | Brown Stadium; Providence, RI | L 20–23 | 10,500 | |
| October 5 | at Yale | Yale Bowl; New Haven, CT | W 21–20 | 31,789 | |
| October 12 | at Dartmouth | Memorial Field; Hanover, NH | L 0–35 | 13,500 | |
| October 19 | Penn | Brown Stadium; Providence, RI | W 20–7 | 8,000 | |
| October 26 | Rhode Island* | Brown Stadium; Providence, RI (rivalry) | W 21–7 | 18,500 | |
| November 2 | Princeton | Brown Stadium; Providence, RI | L 0–7 | 9,000 | |
| November 9 | at Cornell | Schoellkopf Field; Ithaca, NY | L 6–13 | 11,000 | |
| November 16 | at Harvard | Harvard Stadium; Boston, MA | W 33–6 | 17,000 | |
| November 28 | Colgate* | Brown Stadium; Providence, RI | W 33–7 | 10,500 | |
*Non-conference game
