= Jackie Burkett =

American football player (1936–2017)

No. 55, 60
- Positions: Linebacker, center

Personal information
- Born: December 16, 1936; Thorsby, Alabama, U.S.
- Died: September 1, 2017 (aged 80); Fort Walton Beach, Florida, U.S.
- Listed height: 6 ft 4 in (1.93 m)
- Listed weight: 230 lb (104 kg)

Career information
- High school: Choctawhatchee (FL)
- College: Auburn
- NFL draft: 1959: 1st round, 12th overall pick
- AFL draft: 1960: 1st round

Career history
- Baltimore Colts (1960–1966); New Orleans Saints (1967); Dallas Cowboys (1968–1969); New Orleans Saints (1970)

Awards and highlights
- National champion (1957); First-team All-American (1958); Second-team All-American (1959); 2× First-team All-SEC (1958, 1959); Second-team All-SEC (1957); All-SEC Sophomore of the year (1957); All-SEC Center of the year (1958); All-SEC Linebacker of the year (1958)

Career NFL/AFL statistics
- Interceptions: 10
- Fumble recoveries: 7
- Sacks: 9.5
- Stats at Pro Football Reference

Walter Jackson Burkett (/bɜːrˈkɛt/ bur-KET; December 16, 1936 – September 1, 2017) was an American football linebacker in the National Football League (NFL) for the Baltimore Colts, New Orleans Saints, and Dallas Cowboys. He played college football at Auburn University.

== Early life ==
Burkett began playing sports at Andalusia High School, where he was a three-sport athlete (football, basketball, and baseball). After his sophomore season he transferred to Choctawhatchee High School and became a two-year starter in football.

As a junior, he played center on offense and linebacker on defense. In his last year he was moved to quarterback and received All-conference honors. He was also captain of the basketball team.

== College career ==
Burkett accepted a scholarship from Auburn University, where he was a two-way player, playing center and linebacker, while also calling the defensive signals.

He was named a starter as a sophomore and was a part of a team that won the SEC and the National championship. That squad was led by its defense, which registered 6 shutouts in 10 games and allowed 28 total points in the season (no more than 7 points in any game). In his last year he was limited with a chronic shoulder injury, that caused it to be discolcated several times.

During his college career, his teams had a 26–3–1 record and were a part of two undefeated seasons. He also practiced baseball and basketball (only as a freshman).

In 1988, he was inducted into the Alabama Sports Hall of Fame. He also was named to the Auburn All-Century football team and Walk of Fame.

== Professional career ==
=== Baltimore Colts ===
Burkett was selected by the Baltimore Colts in the first round (12th overall) of the 1959 NFL draft with a future draft pick, which allowed the team to draft him before his college eligibility was over. He was also selected by the New York Titans in the 1960 AFL draft. As a rookie, he suffered from shoulder problems in preseason, so he was operated on and placed on the injured reserve list.

In 1962, he was named a starter in a linebacker corps that included Bill Pellington and Don Shinnick. He was mostly a backup during his time with the Colts.

=== New Orleans Saints (first stint) ===
Burkett became one of the original members of the New Orleans Saints, after being selected in the 1967 NFL expansion draft and playing in 14 regular season games as a backup outside linebacker.

On August 28, 1968, he was traded to the Dallas Cowboys in exchange for offensive tackle Jim Boeke.

=== Dallas Cowboys ===
In 1968, after trading top linebacker backup Harold Hays, the Dallas Cowboys acquired Burkett and Dave Simmons for depth purposes. He played in only three games, after suffering a broken left fibula against the Green Bay Packers on October 28. The next season, he appeared in 11 games as a backup.

On June 23, 1970, he was traded to the New Orleans Saints in exchange for safety Dave Whitsell and rookie running back Tom Broadhead.

=== New Orleans Saints (second stint) ===
In 1970, he started 10 games at outside linebacker and was also the team´s long snapper. On November 8 against the Detroit Lions, he became a part of league history, when he snapped the ball that Tom Dempsey kicked on the final play of a 19–17 win, for a then NFL record 63-yard field goal. He retired after the season.

== Personal life ==
He co-owned a restaurant in the French Quarter of New Orleans for five years (1968–73). He also worked as a sales manager for a pipe business and as the marketing vice president with the engineering firm Post, Buckley, Schuh and Jernigan, that designed bridges and roads. He was the county commissioner in Fort Walton Beach from 2000 to 2008. He died of leukemia on September 1, 2017, aged 80.
