= 1957 Harvard Crimson football team =

American college football season

1957 Harvard Crimson football
- Conference: Ivy League
- Record: 3–5 (2–5 Ivy)
- Head coach: John Yovicsin (1st season)
- Captain: Thomas B. Hooper
- Home stadium: Harvard Stadium

1957 Ivy League football standings
	Conf.					Overall
Team	W		L		T	W		L		T
Princeton $	6	–	1	–	0	7	–	2	–	0
Dartmouth	5	–	1	–	1	7	–	1	–	1
Yale	4	–	2	–	1	6	–	2	–	1
Brown	3	–	4	–	0	5	–	4	–	0
Cornell	3	–	4	–	0	3	–	6	–	0
Penn	3	–	4	–	0	3	–	6	–	0
Harvard	2	–	5	–	0	3	–	5	–	0
Columbia	1	–	6	–	0	1	–	8	–	0
$ – Conference champion

The 1957 Harvard Crimson football team was an American football team that represented Harvard University as a member of the Ivy League during the 1957 college football season.

In their first year under head coach John Yovicsin, the Crimson compiled a 3–5 record and were outscored 180 to 78. Thomas B. Hooper was the team captain.

Harvard's 2–5 conference record finished seventh in the Ivy League. The Crimson were outscored 173 to 64 by Ivy opponents.

Harvard played its home games at Harvard Stadium in the Allston neighborhood of Boston, Massachusetts.

== Schedule ==
Date	Opponent	Site	Result	Attendance	Source
October 5	Cornell	Harvard Stadium; Boston, MA	L 6–20	13,000	
October 12	Ohio*	Harvard Stadium; Boston, MA	W 14–7	10,000	
October 19	Columbia	Harvard Stadium; Boston, MA	W 19–6	10,000	
October 26	Dartmouth	Harvard Stadium; Boston, MA (rivalry)	L 0–26	30,000	
November 2	at Penn	Franklin Field; Philadelphia, PA (rivalry)	W 13–6	16,381	
November 9	Princeton	Harvard Stadium; Boston, MA (rivalry)	L 20–28	31,000	
November 16	Brown	Harvard Stadium; Boston, MA	L 6–33	17,000	
November 23	at Yale	Yale Bowl; New Haven, CT (The Game)	L 0–54	55,817	
*Non-conference game
