= 1958 Sugar Bowl =

American college football game

- 24th Sugar Bowl
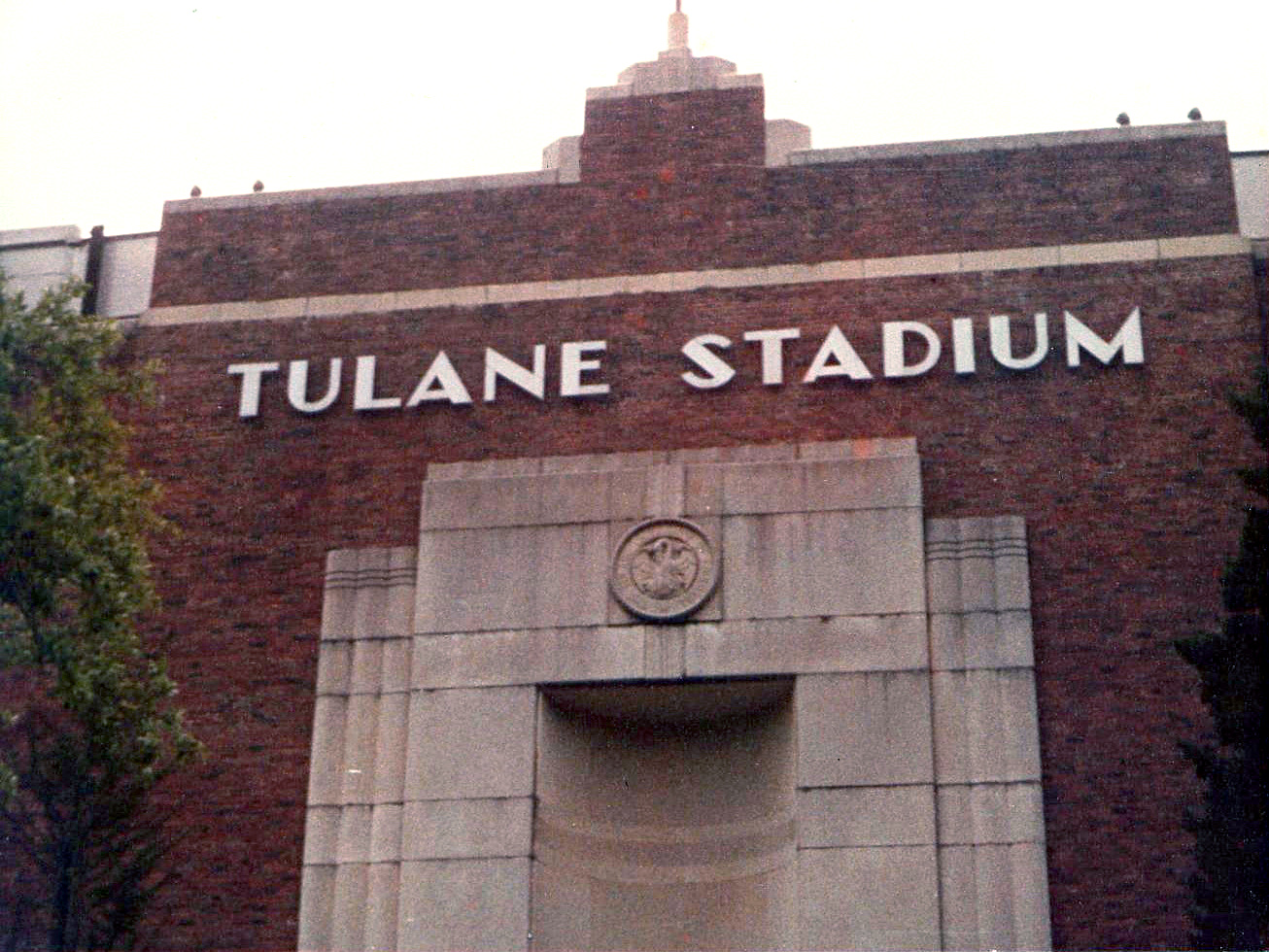
- Tulane Stadium in New Orleans, Louisiana, hosted the Sugar Bowl.
Ole Miss Rebels	Texas Longhorns
(8–1–1)	(6–3–1)
SEC	SWC
39	7
Head coach: Johnny Vaught	Head coach: Darrell Royal
AP / Coaches; 7 / 8	AP / Coaches; 11 / 11
	1	2	3	4	Total
Ole Miss	6	13	7	13	39
Texas	0	0	0	7	7
- Date: January 1, 1958
- Season: 1957
- Stadium: Tulane Stadium
- Location: New Orleans, Louisiana
- Referee: Cliff Shaw (SWC; split crew: SWC, SEC)

United States TV coverage
- Network: NBC
- Announcers: Lindsey Nelson and Red Grange

The 1958 Sugar Bowl featured the seventh-ranked Ole Miss Rebels and the eleventh-ranked Texas Longhorns.

== Background ==
This was the first game broadcast by NBC.

== Game summary ==
In the first quarter, Ole Miss quarterback Raymond Brown scored on a 1-yard touchdown run as the Rebels took a 6–0 lead. He finished the game with 157 yards rushing on 15 carries. In the second quarter, Brown threw a 3-yard touchdown pass to Don Williams as Ole Miss led 13–0. Kent Lovelace scored on a 9–yard run as Ole Miss led 19–0 at halftime.

In the third quarter, Bobby Franklin scored on a 3-yard run as Ole Miss led 26–0. Texas scored on a 1-yard touchdown run by George Blanch to narrow the score to 26–7. Brown scored on a 92-yard touchdown run making the score 33–7. Billy Brewer's 12-yard touchdown pass to Tommy Taylor made the final score 39–7.
