= 1957 Columbia Lions football team =

American college football season

1957 Columbia Lions football
- Conference: Ivy League
- Record: 1–8 (1–6 Ivy)
- Head coach: Aldo Donelli (1st season)
- Captain: George Pappas
- Home stadium: Baker Field

1957 Ivy League football standings
	Conf.					Overall
Team	W		L		T	W		L		T
Princeton $	6	–	1	–	0	7	–	2	–	0
Dartmouth	5	–	1	–	1	7	–	1	–	1
Yale	4	–	2	–	1	6	–	2	–	1
Brown	3	–	4	–	0	5	–	4	–	0
Cornell	3	–	4	–	0	3	–	6	–	0
Penn	3	–	4	–	0	3	–	6	–	0
Harvard	2	–	5	–	0	3	–	5	–	0
Columbia	1	–	6	–	0	1	–	8	–	0
$ – Conference champion

The 1957 Columbia Lions football team was an American football team that represented Columbia University as a member of the Ivy League during the 1957 college football season.

In their first season under head coach Aldo "Buff" Donelli, the Lions compiled a 1–8 record and were outscored 214 to 54. George Pappas was the team captain.

The Lions' 1–6 conference record finished last in the Ivy League. Columbia was outscored 148 to 41 by Ivy opponents.

Columbia played its home games at Baker Field in Upper Manhattan, in New York City.

== Schedule ==
Date	Opponent	Site	Result	Attendance	Source
September 28	at Brown	Brown Stadium; Providence, RI	W 23–20	10,500	
October 5	Princeton	Baker Field; New York, NY	L 6–47	15,000	
October 12	at Yale	Yale Bowl; New Haven, CT	L 0–19	19,285	
October 19	at Harvard	Harvard Stadium; Boston, MA	L 6–19	10,000	
October 26	at Lehigh*^{†}	Baker Field; New York, NY	L 6–40	12,000	
November 2	at Cornell	Schoellkopf Field; Ithaca, NY (rivalry)	L 0–8	10,000	
November 9	Dartmouth	Baker Field; New York, NY	L 0–7	13,000	
November 16	at Penn	Baker Field; New York, NY	L 6–28	12,000	
November 23	Rutgers*	Baker Field; New York, NY	L 7–26	10,000	
*Non-conference game; ^{†}Homecoming
