= 1957 Gator Bowl =

American college football game

Tennessee Volunteers	Texas A&M Aggies
(7–3)	(8–2)
SEC	SWC
3	0
Head coach: Bowden Wyatt	Head coach: Bear Bryant
AP / Coaches; 13 / 16	AP / Coaches; 9 / 10
	1	2	3	4	Total
Tennessee	0	0	0	3	3
Texas A&M	0	0	0	0	0
- Date: December 28, 1957
- Season: 1957
- Stadium: Gator Bowl Stadium
- Location: Jacksonville, Florida
- MVP: TB Bobby Gordon (Tennessee); HB John David Crow (Texas A&M)
- Referee: E.D. Cavette (SEC; split crew: SEC, SWC)

United States TV coverage
- Network: CBS

The 1957 Gator Bowl was an American college football bowl game played on December 28, 1957, at Gator Bowl Stadium in Jacksonville, Florida. It was the 13th annual playing of the Gator Bowl. The game pitted the Tennessee Volunteers and the Texas A&M Aggies.

== Background ==
The Volunteers lost their first game of the season to Auburn, but they responded with six straight victories to rise to #7 in the rankings before a matchup with #8 Ole Miss. A 14–7 loss to the Rebels and a 20–6 loss to Kentucky dropped them to #18, but they finished strong with a 20–6 win over Vanderbilt to rise to #13. This was their second straight bowl appearance and first Gator Bowl appearance. They finished behind Auburn (on probation), Ole Miss, Mississippi State, and Florida.

As for the Aggies, they went from 9–0–1 the previous year to 8–2, though they did win eight straight games, including being ranked #1 for three weeks. However, they lost to #20 Rice 7–6 to fall to #4. A 9–7 loss to Texas dropped them to #8 to end the regular season, as they finished third in the Southwest Conference.

== Game summary ==
Sammy Burklow kicked a 17-yard field goal to provide the winning points for the Volunteers. On first downs, Tennessee had 14 to Texas A&M's 8. The Aggies had more rushing yards (142 to the vols' 135), but the Vols had more passing yards (56 to Texas A&M's 27). The Aggies turned the ball over twice while the Volunteers turned it over once. Bobby Gordon and John David Crow were named MVPs. Gordon threw 4-of-6 for 56 yards, while rushing for 60 yards on 32 carries. Crow rushed for 46 yards on 14 carries.

== Aftermath ==
The Volunteers would not win more than six games in the rest of Wyatt's tenure, nor return to a bowl game until 1965. This was Bear Bryant's last game with the Aggies, as he left to coach Alabama. A&M would not return to another bowl game until 1968. Tennessee has returned to the Gator Bowl five times, the last being 2020 vs the Indiana Hoosiers. Texas A&M returned in 2018 for the first time since 1957.
