= 1957 Ole Miss Rebels football team =

American college football season

1957 Ole Miss Rebels football

Sugar Bowl champion

Sugar Bowl, W 39–7 vs. Texas
- Conference: Southeastern Conference

Ranking
- Coaches: No. 8
- AP: No. 7
- Record: 9–1–1 (5–0–1 SEC)
- Head coach: Johnny Vaught (11th season)
- Captains: Jackie Simpson; Gene Hickerson
- Home stadium: Hemingway Stadium

1957 Southeastern Conference football standings
| | Conf. | | | | | Overall |
| Team | W | | L | | T | W | | L | | T |
|---|---|---|---|---|---|---|---|---|---|---|
| No. 1 Auburn $ | 7 | – | 0 | – | 0 | 10 | – | 0 | – | 0 |
| No. 7 Ole Miss | 5 | – | 0 | – | 1 | 9 | – | 1 | – | 1 |
| No. 14 Mississippi State | 4 | – | 2 | – | 1 | 6 | – | 2 | – | 1 |
| No. 17 Florida | 4 | – | 2 | – | 1 | 6 | – | 2 | – | 1 |
| No. 13 Tennessee | 4 | – | 3 | – | 0 | 8 | – | 3 | – | 0 |
| Vanderbilt | 3 | – | 3 | – | 1 | 5 | – | 3 | – | 2 |
| LSU | 4 | – | 4 | – | 0 | 5 | – | 5 | – | 0 |
| Georgia Tech | 3 | – | 4 | – | 1 | 4 | – | 4 | – | 2 |
| Georgia | 3 | – | 4 | – | 0 | 3 | – | 7 | – | 0 |
| Tulane | 1 | – | 5 | – | 0 | 2 | – | 8 | – | 0 |
| Alabama | 1 | – | 6 | – | 1 | 2 | – | 7 | – | 1 |
| Kentucky | 1 | – | 7 | – | 0 | 3 | – | 7 | – | 0 |
$ – Conference champion; Rankings from AP Poll

The 1957 Ole Miss Rebels football team represented the University of Mississippi during the 1957 college football season. The Rebels were led by 11th-year head coach Johnny Vaught and played their home games at Hemingway Stadium in Oxford, Mississippi (and alternate site home games in Jackson, Mississippi). They competed as members of the Southeastern Conference, finishing second with a regular season record of 8–1–1 (5–0–1 SEC), and were ranked 7th in the final AP Poll. They were invited to the 1958 Sugar Bowl, where they defeated Texas, 39–7.

== Schedule ==
| Date | Opponent | Rank | Site | Result | Attendance | Source |
|---|---|---|---|---|---|---|
| September 21 | at Trinity (TX)* | | Alamo Stadium; San Antonio, TX | W 44–0 | 11,527 | |
| September 28 | at Kentucky | No. 19 | McLean Stadium; Lexington, KY | W 15–0 | | |
| October 5 | Hardin–Simmons* | No. 15 | Hemingway Stadium; Oxford, MS | W 34–7 | 12,000 | |
| October 12 | at Vanderbilt | No. 14 | Dudley Field; Nashville, TN (rivalry) | W 28–0 | 24,000 | |
| October 18 | at Tulane | No. 11 | Tulane Stadium; New Orleans, LA (rivalry) | W 50–0 | 30,000 | |
| October 26 | vs. Arkansas* | No. 6 | Crump Stadium; Memphis, TN (rivalry) | L 6–12 | 30,601 | |
| November 2 | Houston* | No. 14 | Mississippi Veterans Memorial Stadium; Jackson, MS | W 20–7 | 27,000 | |
| November 9 | LSU^{†} | No. 14 | Hemingway Stadium; Oxford, MS (rivalry) | W 14–12 | 30,000 | |
| November 16 | vs. No. 7 Tennessee | No. 8 | Crump Stadium; Memphis, TN (rivalry) | W 14–7 | 31,000 | |
| November 30 | at No. 13 Mississippi State | No. 7 | Scott Field; Starkville, MS (Egg Bowl) | T 7–7 | 35,000 | |
| January 1 | vs. Texas* | No. 7 | Tulane Stadium; New Orleans, LA (Sugar Bowl) | W 39–7 | 82,000 | |
*Non-conference game; ^{†}Homecoming; Rankings from AP Poll released prior to the game

== Roster ==
- DB Billy Brewer
- E Johnny Lee Brewer
