= 1957 Kentucky Wildcats football team =

American college football season

1957 Kentucky Wildcats football
- Conference: Southeastern Conference
- Record: 3–7 (1–7 SEC)
- Head coach: Blanton Collier (4th season)
- Home stadium: McLean Stadium

1957 Southeastern Conference football standings
	Conf.					Overall
Team	W		L		T	W		L		T
No. 1 Auburn $	7	–	0	–	0	10	–	0	–	0
No. 7 Ole Miss	5	–	0	–	1	9	–	1	–	1
No. 14 Mississippi State	4	–	2	–	1	6	–	2	–	1
No. 17 Florida	4	–	2	–	1	6	–	2	–	1
No. 13 Tennessee	4	–	3	–	0	8	–	3	–	0
Vanderbilt	3	–	3	–	1	5	–	3	–	2
LSU	4	–	4	–	0	5	–	5	–	0
Georgia Tech	3	–	4	–	1	4	–	4	–	2
Georgia	3	–	4	–	0	3	–	7	–	0
Tulane	1	–	5	–	0	2	–	8	–	0
Alabama	1	–	6	–	1	2	–	7	–	1
Kentucky	1	–	7	–	0	3	–	7	–	0
$ – Conference champion; Rankings from AP Poll

The 1957 Kentucky Wildcats football team were an American football team that represented the University of Kentucky as a member of the Southeastern Conference during the 1957 college football season. In their fourth season under head coach Blanton Collier, the team compiled a 3–7 record (1–7 in the SEC).

== Schedule ==
Date	Opponent	Site	Result	Attendance	Source
September 21	at No. 11 Georgia Tech	Grant Field; Atlanta, GA	L 0–13	40,000	
September 28	No. 19 Ole Miss	McLean Stadium; Lexington, KY	L 0–15		
October 5	Florida	McLean Stadium; Lexington, KY (rivalry)	L 7–14	33,000	
October 12	at No. 9 Auburn	Cliff Hare Stadium; Auburn, AL	L 0–6		
October 19	at No. 17 LSU	Tiger Stadium; Baton Rouge, LA	L 0–21	53,824	
October 26	Georgia	McLean Stadium; Lexington, KY	L 14–33	25,000	
November 2	Memphis State*	McLean Stadium; Lexington, KY	W 53–7		
November 9	at Vanderbilt	Dudley Field; Nashville, TN (rivalry)	L 7–12	23,429	
November 16	Xavier*	McLean Stadium; Lexington, KY	W 27–0	20,000	
November 23	No. 12 Tennessee	McLean Stadium; Lexington, KY (rivalry)	W 20–6	36,500	
*Non-conference game; Rankings from Coaches' Poll released prior to the game
