= 1957 Auburn Tigers football team =

American college football season

1957 Auburn Tigers football

AP Poll national champion SEC champion
- Conference: Southeastern Conference

Ranking
- Coaches: No. 2
- AP: No. 1
- Record: 10–0 (7–0 SEC)
- Head coach: Ralph Jordan (7th season)
- Home stadium: Cliff Hare Stadium; Legion Field

1957 Southeastern Conference football standings
	Conf.					Overall
Team	W		L		T	W		L		T
No. 1 Auburn $	7	–	0	–	0	10	–	0	–	0
No. 7 Ole Miss	5	–	0	–	1	9	–	1	–	1
No. 14 Mississippi State	4	–	2	–	1	6	–	2	–	1
No. 17 Florida	4	–	2	–	1	6	–	2	–	1
No. 13 Tennessee	4	–	3	–	0	8	–	3	–	0
Vanderbilt	3	–	3	–	1	5	–	3	–	2
LSU	4	–	4	–	0	5	–	5	–	0
Georgia Tech	3	–	4	–	1	4	–	4	–	2
Georgia	3	–	4	–	0	3	–	7	–	0
Tulane	1	–	5	–	0	2	–	8	–	0
Alabama	1	–	6	–	1	2	–	7	–	1
Kentucky	1	–	7	–	0	3	–	7	–	0
$ – Conference champion; Rankings from AP Poll

The 1957 Auburn Tigers football team was an American football team that represented Alabama Polytechnic Institute (Auburn) in the Southeastern Conference (SEC) during the 1957 college football season. In their seventh season under head coach Ralph "Shug" Jordan, the Tigers compiled a perfect 10–0 record (7–0 in the SEC), shut out six of ten opponents, won the SEC championship, and outscored all opponents by a total of 207 to 28.

The national championship was split with Auburn No. 1 in the AP Poll and Ohio State, despite one loss, ranked No. 1 by the UPI coaches poll, Football Writers Association of America and International News Service. In later analyses, Auburn was chosen as national champion by the majority of selectors, including the Billingsley Report, College Football Researchers Association, Helms Athletic Foundation, National Championship Foundation, Poling System, Sagarin Ratings, and Williamson System. It also marked Auburn's first SEC title, and first outright conference title since winning the Southern Conference in 1932.

The team was ineligible for a bowl game after one of Jordan's assistants was caught paying two prospective recruits $500 each.

Auburn end Jimmy Phillips was a consensus first-team pick on the 1957 All-America college football team. Phillips and fellow end Jerry Wilson were both selected as first-team picks on the 1957 All-SEC football team. Center Jackie Burkett, tackle Ben Preston, and back Bill Atkins were named to the All-SEC second team.

== Schedule ==
Date	Opponent	Rank	Site	Result	Attendance	Source
September 28	at No. 8 Tennessee		Shields–Watkins Field; Knoxville, TN	W 7–0	42,000	
October 5	Chattanooga*	No. 7	Cliff Hare Stadium; Auburn, AL	W 40–7	17,000	
October 12	Kentucky	No. 9	Cliff Hare Stadium; Auburn, AL	W 6–0		
October 19	at Georgia Tech	No. 9	Grant Field; Atlanta, GA	W 3–0	40,000	
October 26	at Houston*	No. 5	Rice Stadium; Houston, TX	W 48–7	30,000	
November 2	No. 19 Florida^{†}	No. 4	Cliff Hare Stadium; Auburn, AL (rivalry)	W 13–0	36,000	
November 9	No. 17 Mississippi State	No. 3	Legion Field; Birmingham, AL	W 15–7	43,000	
November 16	vs. Georgia	No. 3	Memorial Stadium; Columbus, GA (Deep South's Oldest Rivalry)	W 6–0		
November 23	at Florida State*	No. 2	Doak Campbell Stadium; Tallahassee, FL	W 29–7	15,000	
November 30	vs. Alabama	No. 1	Legion Field; Birmingham, AL (Iron Bowl)	W 40–0	45,000	
*Non-conference game; ^{†}Homecoming; Rankings from AP Poll released prior to the game; Source:

== Roster ==
- Bill Atkins, back
- Tim Baker, guard
- Jackie Burkett, center
- Bobby Hoppe, halfback
- James Jeffrey, offensive lineman
- Tommy Lorino, halfback
- Tommy Lorton, back
- Lloyd Nix, quarterback
- Ken Paduch, offensive/defensive lineman
- Jimmy Phillips, end
- Ben Preston, tackle
- Ronnie Robbs, fullback
- Morris Savage, safety
- Zeke Smith, guard
- Dickie Steber, fullback
- Cleve Wester, tackle
- Jerry Wilson, end
- Bobby Wasden, end

== Coaching staff ==
- George Atkins
- Vince Dooley
- Joel Eaves
- Hal Herring
- Gene Lorendo
