= Cornell–Penn football rivalry =

American college football rivalry

- Cornell Big Red Penn Quakers
- Sport: Football
- First meeting: November 18, 1893; Penn, 50–0
- Latest meeting: November 7, 2026; Penn, 14–13
- Next meeting: November 6, 2027
- Trophy: Trustees' Cup

Statistics
- Total meetings: 132
- All-time series: Penn leads, 79–48–5
- Trophy series: Penn leads, 22–9
- Largest victory: Penn, 59–6 (1945)
- Longest win streak: Penn, 8 (1893–1900, 1940–1947)
- Current win streak: Penn, 1 (2026–present)

Locations of Cornell and Penn

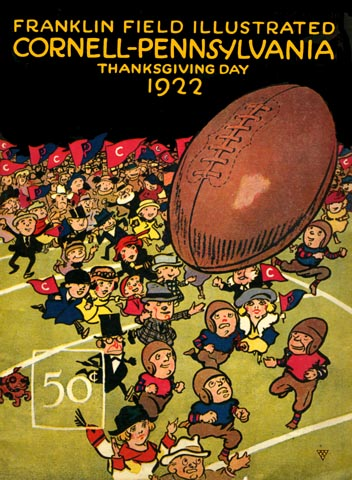
Cornell–Penn football program, November 1922

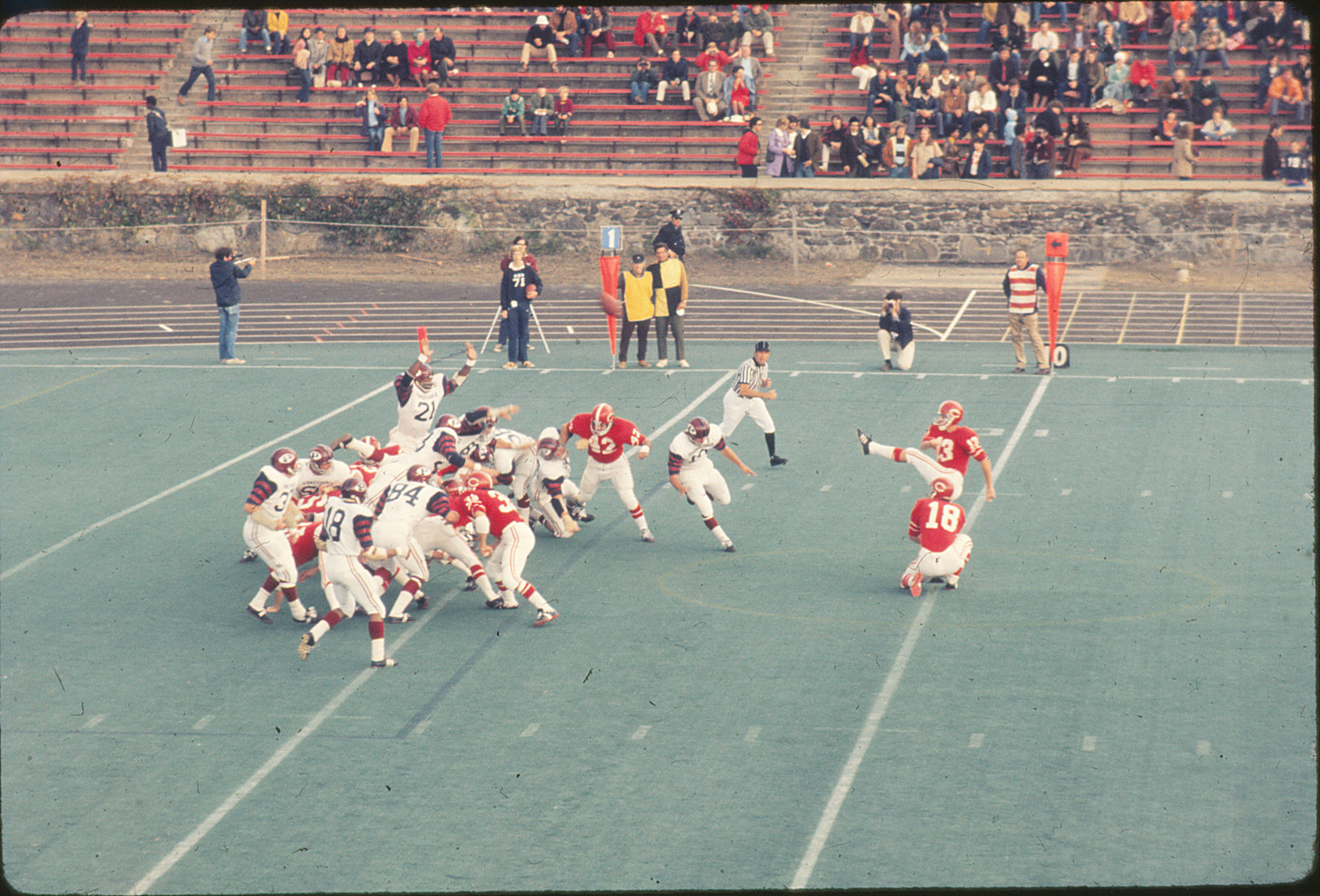
1972 Cornell-Penn game at Schoellkopf Field

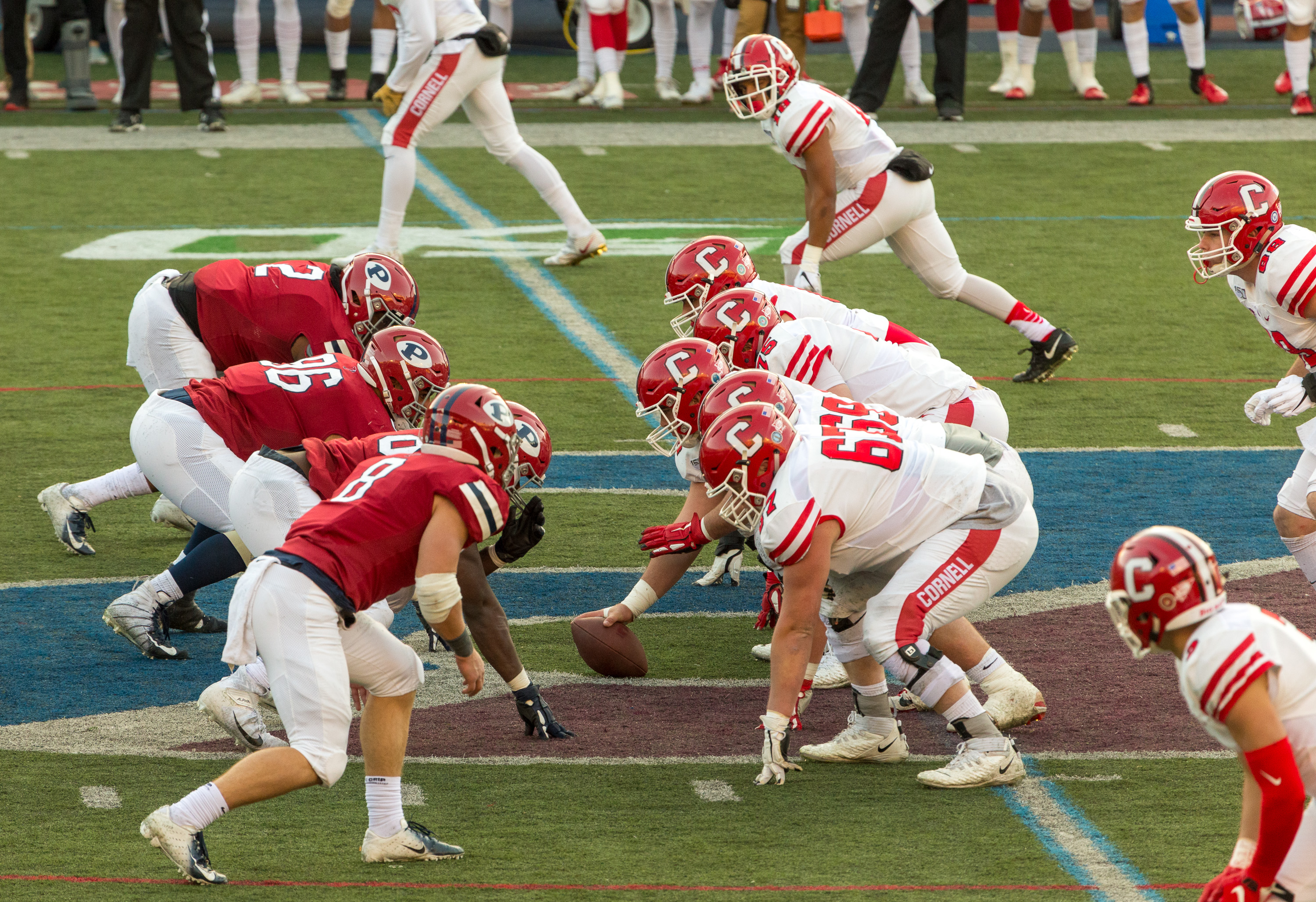
2019 Cornell-Penn game at Franklin Field

The Cornell–Penn football rivalry is an American college football rivalry between the Cornell Big Red and Penn Quakers. Traditionally, the game was played on Thanksgiving Day in Philadelphia, Pennsylvania, but now alternates between Philadelphia and Ithaca, New York. The game was often played as the last game of the regular season for both teams. Beginning in 2018, Cornell has faced Columbia in the last game of the regular season, while Penn plays Princeton in the last game of the regular season. The game was cancelled in 2020 due to the COVID-19 pandemic, marking the first cancellation after an uninterrupted streak of 101 games going back to 1919.

In the 131 meetings since 1893 (interrupted in 1918 and 2020), Penn leads the series 79–48–5, with Penn forfeiting the game in 1997 (because of the participation of an academically ineligible player).

== Attendance ==
The Thanksgiving Cornell–Penn football game, broadcast on national radio before the television era, attracted huge crowds to Franklin Field in Philadelphia. The 1931 game attracted a reported 70,000, and earned a story on the front page of the Philadelphia Inquirer along with a quarter-by-quarter breakdown of every detail of the game. The 1947 game attracted a crowd estimated at "about 80,000". The 1959 game attracted 23,661. By 1965 attendance was down to 10,543, and the Thanksgiving tradition was ended and a standard home-and-away schedule was instituted.

Played in Philadelphia for 69 consecutive meetings from 1894 through 1963 before alternating between Philadelphia and Ithaca, Cornell–Penn is the fifth-most played college football rivalry as of 2022. Dedicated in 1995, the Trustees' Cup has since been awarded annually to the winner of the Cornell–Penn game. Penn has won the Trustees' Cup 21 times to Cornell's 8.

== Game results ==
Cornell victories	Penn victories	Tie games	Forfeits

No.	Date	Location	Winner	Score
1	November 18, 1893	Germantown, Philadelphia, PA	Penn	50–0
2	November 17, 1894	Philadelphia, PA	Penn	6–0
3	November 28, 1895	Philadelphia, PA	Penn	46–2
4	November 26, 1896	Philadelphia, PA	Penn	32–10
5	November 25, 1897	Philadelphia, PA	Penn	4–0
6	November 24, 1898	Philadelphia, PA	Penn	12–6
7	November 30, 1899	Philadelphia, PA	Penn	29–0
8	November 29, 1900	Philadelphia, PA	Penn	27–0
9	November 28, 1901	Philadelphia, PA	Cornell	23–6
10	November 27, 1902	Philadelphia, PA	Penn	12–11
11	November 26, 1903	Philadelphia, PA	Penn	42–0
12	November 24, 1904	Philadelphia, PA	Penn	34–0
13	November 30, 1905	Philadelphia, PA	Penn	6–5
14	November 29, 1906	Philadelphia, PA	Tie	0–0
15	November 28, 1907	Philadelphia, PA	Penn	12–4
16	November 26, 1908	Philadelphia, PA	Penn	17–4
17	November 25, 1909	Philadelphia, PA	Penn	17–6
18	November 24, 1910	Philadelphia, PA	Penn	12–6
19	November 30, 1911	Philadelphia, PA	Penn	21–9
20	November 28, 1912	Philadelphia, PA	Penn	7–2
21	November 27, 1913	Philadelphia, PA	Cornell	21–0
22	November 26, 1914	Philadelphia, PA	Cornell	24–12
23	November 25, 1915	Philadelphia, PA	Cornell	24–9
24	November 30, 1916	Philadelphia, PA	Penn	23–3
25	November 29, 1917	Philadelphia, PA	Penn	37–0
26	November 27, 1919	Philadelphia, PA	Penn	24–0
27	November 25, 1920	Philadelphia, PA	Penn	28–0
28	November 24, 1921	Philadelphia, PA	Cornell	41–0
29	November 30, 1922	Philadelphia, PA	Cornell	9–0
30	November 29, 1923	Philadelphia, PA	Cornell	14–7
31	November 27, 1924	Philadelphia, PA	Penn	20–0
32	November 26, 1925	Philadelphia, PA	Penn	7–0
33	November 25, 1926	Philadelphia, PA	Tie	10–10
34	November 24, 1927	Philadelphia, PA	Penn	35–0
35	November 29, 1928	Philadelphia, PA	Penn	49–0
36	November 28, 1929	Philadelphia, PA	Penn	17–7
37	November 27, 1930	Philadelphia, PA	Cornell	13–7
38	November 26, 1931	Philadelphia, PA	Cornell	7–0
39	November 24, 1932	Philadelphia, PA	Penn	13–7
40	November 30, 1933	Philadelphia, PA	Cornell	20–12
41	November 29, 1934	Philadelphia, PA	Penn	23–13
42	November 28, 1935	Philadelphia, PA	Penn	33–7
43	November 26, 1936	Philadelphia, PA	Penn	14–6
44	November 25, 1937	Philadelphia, PA	Cornell	34–20
45	November 24, 1938	Philadelphia, PA	Tie	0–0
46	November 25, 1939	Philadelphia, PA	Cornell	26–0
47	November 23, 1940	Philadelphia, PA	Penn	22–20
48	November 22, 1941	Philadelphia, PA	Penn	16–0
49	November 26, 1942	Philadelphia, PA	Penn	34–7
50	November 25, 1943	Philadelphia, PA	Penn	20–14
51	November 25, 1944	Philadelphia, PA	Penn	20–0
52	November 24, 1945	Philadelphia, PA	Penn	59–6
53	November 28, 1946	Philadelphia, PA	Penn	26–20
54	November 27, 1947	Philadelphia, PA	Penn	21–0
55	November 25, 1948	Philadelphia, PA	Cornell	23–14
56	November 24, 1949	Philadelphia, PA	Cornell	29–21
57	November 25, 1950	Philadelphia, PA	Cornell	13–6
58	November 24, 1951	Philadelphia, PA	Penn	7–0
59	November 27, 1952	Philadelphia, PA	Penn	14–7
60	November 26, 1953	Philadelphia, PA	Tie	7–7
61	November 25, 1954	Philadelphia, PA	Cornell	20–6
62	November 24, 1955	Philadelphia, PA	Cornell	39–7
63	November 22, 1956	Philadelphia, PA	Cornell	20–7
64	November 28, 1957	Philadelphia, PA	Penn	14–6
65	November 27, 1958	Philadelphia, PA	Cornell	19–7
66	November 26, 1959	Philadelphia, PA	Penn	28–13
67	November 24, 1960	Philadelphia, PA	Penn	18–7

No.	Date	Location	Winner	Score
68	November 25, 1961	Philadelphia, PA	Cornell	31–0
69	November 24, 1962	Philadelphia, PA	Cornell	29–22
70	November 28, 1963	Philadelphia, PA	Cornell	17–8
71	October 10, 1964	Ithaca, NY	Cornell	33–0
72	November 25, 1965	Philadelphia, PA	Cornell	38–14
73	October 8, 1966	Ithaca, NY	Cornell	45–28
74	November 25, 1967	Philadelphia, PA	Cornell	33–14
75	October 12, 1968	Ithaca, NY	Penn	10–8
76	November 22, 1969	Philadelphia, PA	Cornell	28–14
77	October 10, 1970	Ithaca, NY	Cornell	32–31
78	November 20, 1971	Philadelphia, PA	Cornell	41–13
79	October 14, 1972	Ithaca, NY	Cornell	24–20
80	November 24, 1973	Philadelphia, PA	Penn	31–22
81	October 12, 1974	Ithaca, NY	Tie	28–28
82	November 22, 1975	Philadelphia, PA	Penn	27–21
83	November 13, 1976	Ithaca, NY	Cornell	31–13
84	September 17, 1977	Philadelphia, PA	Penn	17–7
85	November 18, 1978	Ithaca, NY	Cornell	35–17
86	September 22, 1979	Philadelphia, PA	Cornell	52–13
87	November 22, 1980	Ithaca, NY	Cornell	31–9
88	September 19, 1981	Philadelphia, PA	Penn	29–22
89	November 20, 1982	Ithaca, NY	Cornell	23–0
90	September 17, 1983	Philadelphia, PA	Penn	28–7
91	November 17, 1984	Ithaca, NY	Penn	24–0
92	September 21, 1985	Philadelphia, PA	Penn	10–6
93	November 22, 1986	Ithaca, NY	Penn	31–21
94	September 19, 1987	Philadelphia, PA	Cornell	17–13
95	November 19, 1988	Ithaca, NY	Cornell	19–6
96	November 23, 1989	Philadelphia, PA	Cornell	20–6
97	November 17, 1990	Ithaca, NY	Cornell	21–15
98	November 23, 1991	Philadelphia, PA	Penn	14–13
99	November 21, 1992	Ithaca, NY	Penn	14–7
100	November 20, 1993	Philadelphia, PA	Penn	17–14
101	November 19, 1994	Ithaca, NY	Penn	18–14
102	November 28, 1995	Philadelphia, PA	Penn	37–18
103	November 23, 1996	Ithaca, NY	Cornell	24–21
104	November 22, 1997	Philadelphia, PA	Penn*	33–20
105	November 21, 1998	Ithaca, NY	Penn	35–21
106	November 20, 1999	Philadelphia, PA	Cornell	20–12
107	November 18, 2000	Ithaca, NY	Penn	45–15
108	November 17, 2001	Philadelphia, PA	Penn	38–14
109	November 23, 2002	Ithaca, NY	Penn	31–0
110	November 22, 2003	Philadelphia, PA	Penn	59–7
111	November 20, 2004	Ithaca, NY	Penn	20–14
112	November 19, 2005	Philadelphia, PA	Cornell	16–7
113	November 18, 2006	Ithaca, NY	Cornell	28–27
114	November 17, 2007	Philadelphia, PA	Penn	45–9
115	November 22, 2008	Ithaca, NY	Penn	23–6
116	November 21, 2009	Philadelphia, PA	Penn	34–0
117	November 20, 2010	Ithaca, NY	Penn	31–7
118	November 19, 2011	Philadelphia, PA	Cornell	48–38
119	November 17, 2012	Ithaca, NY	Penn	35–28
120	November 23, 2013	Philadelphia, PA	Cornell	42–41
121	November 22, 2014	Ithaca, NY	Penn	34–26
122	November 21, 2015	Philadelphia, PA	Penn	34–21
123	November 19, 2016	Ithaca, NY	Penn	42–20
124	November 18, 2017	Philadelphia, PA	Penn	29–22
125	November 2, 2018	Ithaca, NY	Penn	20–7
126	November 9, 2019	Philadelphia, PA	Penn	21–20
127	November 6, 2021	Philadelphia, PA	Cornell	15–12
128	November 5, 2022	Ithaca, NY	Penn	28–21
129	November 4, 2023	Philadelphia, PA	Penn	23–8
130	November 9, 2024	Ithaca, NY	Penn	67–49
131	November 8, 2025	Philadelphia, PA	Cornell	39–17
132	November 7, 2026	Ithaca, NY	Penn	14–13
Series: Penn leads 79–48–5
Source: * Pennsylvania forfeit (1997)

== See also ==
- List of NCAA college football rivalry games
- List of most-played college football series in NCAA Division I
