= 1957 Houston Cougars football team =

American college football season

1957 Houston Cougars football
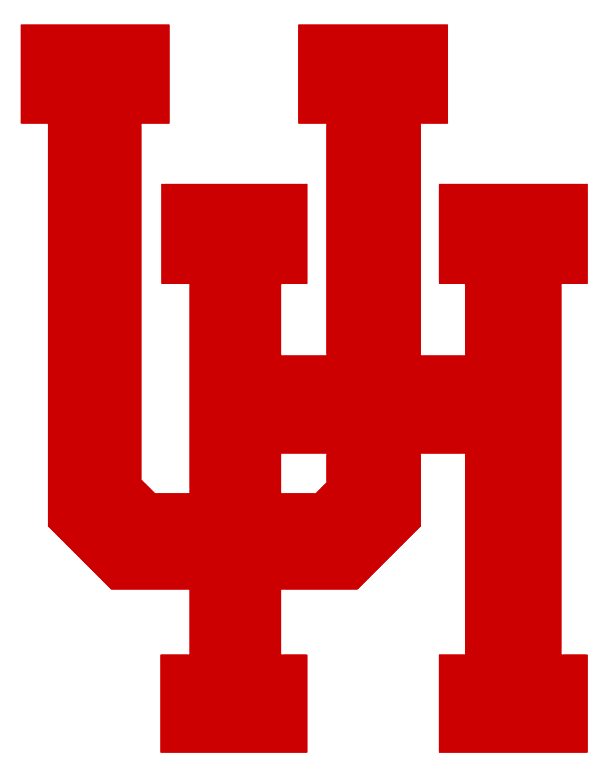

MVC champion
- Conference: Missouri Valley Conference
- Record: 5–4–1 (3–0 MVC)
- Head coach: Hal Lahar (1st season)
- Offensive scheme: Split-T
- Home stadium: Rice Stadium

1957 Missouri Valley Conference football standings
	Conf.					Overall
Team	W		L		T	W		L		T
Houston $	3	–	0	–	0	5	–	4	–	1
North Texas State	1	–	0	–	0	5	–	5	–	0
Tulsa	2	–	2	–	0	4	–	6	–	0
Cincinnati	1	–	2	–	0	5	–	4	–	1
Wichita	0	–	3	–	0	1	–	9	–	0
$ – Conference champion

The 1957 Houston Cougars football team, also known as the Houston Cougars, Houston, or UH, represented the University of Houston in the 1957 college football season. It was the 12th year of season play for Houston. The team was coached by first-year head coach Hal Lahar. The team played its games off-campus at Rice Stadium, which had been built in 1950. Houston won its third conference championship, as the Cougars earned a perfect 3–0 record in conference play. It was the first time a conference championship was achieved by a first-year coach for Houston. Despite losing several key starting players and switching head coaches, Houston was considered a favorite for the conference championship prior to the season's start. Following the season, three of Houston's players from the 1957 roster were drafted in the 1958 NFL draft. Three more 1957 players were also taken in the 1959 NFL draft.

== Schedule ==
Date	Opponent	Rank	Site	Result	Attendance	Source
September 21	No. 14 Miami (FL)*		Rice Stadium; Houston, TX	W 7–0	52,000	
September 28	at No. 11 Baylor*	No. 14	Baylor Stadium; Waco, TX (rivalry)	L 6–14	22,000	
October 5	at Cincinnati		Nippert Stadium; Cincinnati, OH	W 7–0	15,000–18,000	
October 12	at No. 3 Texas A&M*		Kyle Field; College Station, TX	L 6–28	33,000	
October 19	Oklahoma State*		Rice Stadium; Houston, TX	T 6–6	20,000	
October 26	No. 5 Auburn*^{†}		Rice Stadium; Houston, TX	L 7–48	30,000	
November 2	vs. No. 14 Ole Miss*		Mississippi Veterans Memorial Stadium; Jackson, MS	L 7–20	27,000–30,000	
November 9	at Mississippi Southern*		Mississippi Veterans Memorial Stadium; Jackson, MS	W 27–12	11,000	
November 16	at Wichita		Veterans Stadium; Wichita, KS	W 27–6	6,000	
November 23	at Tulsa		Skelly Stadium; Tulsa, OK	W 13–7	13,486	
*Non-conference game; ^{†}Homecoming; Rankings from AP Poll released prior to the game

== Preseason ==
The preseason marked a head coaching change for the Cougars, as head coach Hal Lahar was successfully lured from Colgate on January 18, 1957.

== Game summaries ==
=== Miami (FL) ===
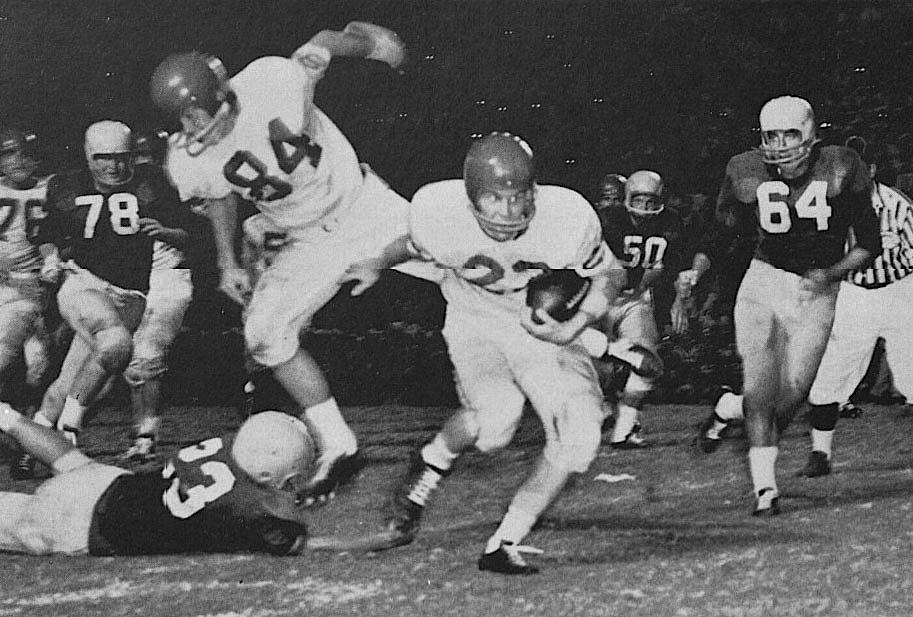
Houston halfback Claude King advances against Miami in a rushing play, while end Bob Borah blocks

	1	2	3	4	Total
#14 Miami	0	0	0	0	0
Houston	0	7	0	0	7

Miami, coached by tenth-year Hurricanes veteran Andy Gustafson, traveled to Rice Stadium to compete against Houston for both of the teams' season opener game. It was the first meeting between the two teams. Miami, an NCAA University Division Independent, was heavily favored to win the game, and were nationally ranked as #14 in the AP Poll.

Both teams struggled offensively, as there were 11 fumbles throughout the game. Miami's longest drive was for only 27 yards. The single score in the game came near the end of the second quarter period when junior Houston halfback rushed for 23 yards with key blocks from senior fullback Owen Mulholland and junior guard Burr Davis. Halfback Mike Michon converted the point after touchdown. Miami responded by taking the ball to Houston's 23-yard line in the second quarter, but ran out of time to complete a successful score. In the fourth quarter, Houston halfback Don Brown ran for 75 yards for a touchdown in the fourth quarter, but this was retracted by officials due to a holding penalty.

With a win against #14 Miami, Houston entered the AP Poll as a nationally ranked team for the first time since the 1952 season.

=== Baylor ===
	1	2	3	4	Total
#14 Houston	0	0	6	0	6
#11 Baylor	0	0	7	7	14

The Houston Cougars went on the road to Waco, Texas to meet with Baylor of the Southwest Conference. Both Houston and Baylor had a six-game winning streak. Baylor led the series 3–2, and were led by second-year head coach Sam Boyd. Also coaching for the Bears was lines coach Harden Cooper, who had previously served in the same capacity for Houston under Hal Lahar from 1950 to 1954. As a pre-season ranked team, and a win against Villanova the week prior, Baylor entered the game nationally ranked at #11 in the AP Poll.

While Houston's offensive strategy centered around a running game, Baylor's game was spearheaded by quarterback Doyle Traylor and a short passing strategy. Traylor completed 11 of 15 passes to help his team win. Throughout the first half of the game, no team scored, but early in the third quarter, Baylor scored a touchdown. Although Houston answered with a 3-yard reception for a touchdown by halfback Claude King, kicker Mike Michon was unable to convert for the point after touchdown.

After the loss, Houston was dropped from the AP Poll, and did not return for the remainder of the season.

=== Cincinnati ===
	1	2	3	4	Total
Houston	0	0	0	7	7
Cincinnati	0	0	0	0	0

For the first time ever, Houston met with Missouri Valley Conference foe Cincinnati at Nippert Stadium in Ohio. Having moved from an independent status in the NCAA, it was Cincinnati's first season as a conference member, and the team was coached by 3rd-year head coach George Blackburn.

After a scoreless three quarters, the fourth quarter of the game saw Houston score a rushing touchdown by halfback Claude King from Cincinnati's four-yard line. Houston's offense had 257 total yards compared to Cincinnati's 97.

With the win against the Bearcats, Houston improved to an overall record of 2–1, and a 1–0 conference record.

=== Texas A&M ===
When Houston met with Texas A&M of the Southwest Conference at Kyle Field, it was the sixth time in history that the two teams had competed against each other. Texas A&M had become a regular opponent for Houston, having met with each other each season since 1952. The Aggies were coached by Bear Bryant, who was serving in his fourth year with the team. Attendance for the game was 33,000. It was the third time on Houston's schedule that they played a nationally ranked team, and Texas A&M was #3 in the AP Poll.

With the loss to Texas A&M, Houston's overall record fell to 2–2. Texas A&M's national ranking improved to the #1 spot later in the season, and the Aggies eventually finished at #9 after a berth in the Gator Bowl. Following the season, head coach Bear Bryant went on to coach Alabama, and won several national championships from 1958 to 1982.

=== Oklahoma State ===
Houston returned home to compete against former conference-mate Oklahoma State. It was the Cowboys' first season as an independent since 1914. The team's head coach was third-year Cliff Speegle, and the Cowboys' entered the game with a 3–1 season record and a three-game winning streak. It would be both Houston and Oklahoma State's sole game of the season with a tied result. Had Oklahoma State won the game, it would have meant a complete sweep of all Missouri Valley former conference-mates.

Although the Cowboys led the game with six points over the Cougars' nil score, a final quarter punt by Oklahoma State's Jim Wiggins was blocked by Houston tackle Hogan Wharton. This allowed Houston to recover the ball on Oklahoma State's 24-yard line. Then, Houston halfback Don Brown managed to complete a nine-yard rushing touchdown. Despite this, when attempting a PAT, kicker Sammy Blount missed, and the score remained tied.

Following the game, Hogan Wharton received the "Lineman of the Week" award from the Missouri Valley Conference. Houston's record became 2–2–1, and Oklahoma State eventually finished their season with a 6–3–1 overall record.

=== Auburn ===
	1	2	3	4	Total
#5 Auburn	16	6	6	20	48
Houston	0	7	0	0	7

Houston hosted Auburn of the Southeastern Conference for their next game. With a perfect 4–0 season record, the Tigers were nationally ranked in the AP Poll as #5. Auburn was coached by seventh-year head coach Ralph Jordan who had led his team to four previous winning seasons with three bowl game appearances, and three finishes in the national rankings.

Starting with a 71-yard touchdown pass with its first play against Houston, Auburn would eventually crush Houston with a 48–7 win. The Cougars' lone touchdown was scored by halfback Paul Sweeten in the second quarter after returning an interception.

Following the win against Houston, Auburn went on to have an undefeated 10–0 season record. They were awarded the national title in the AP Poll, and were ranked as the second-best team in the coaches' poll. As a team on NCAA probation, Auburn was ineligible for a bowl game appearance.

=== Ole Miss ===
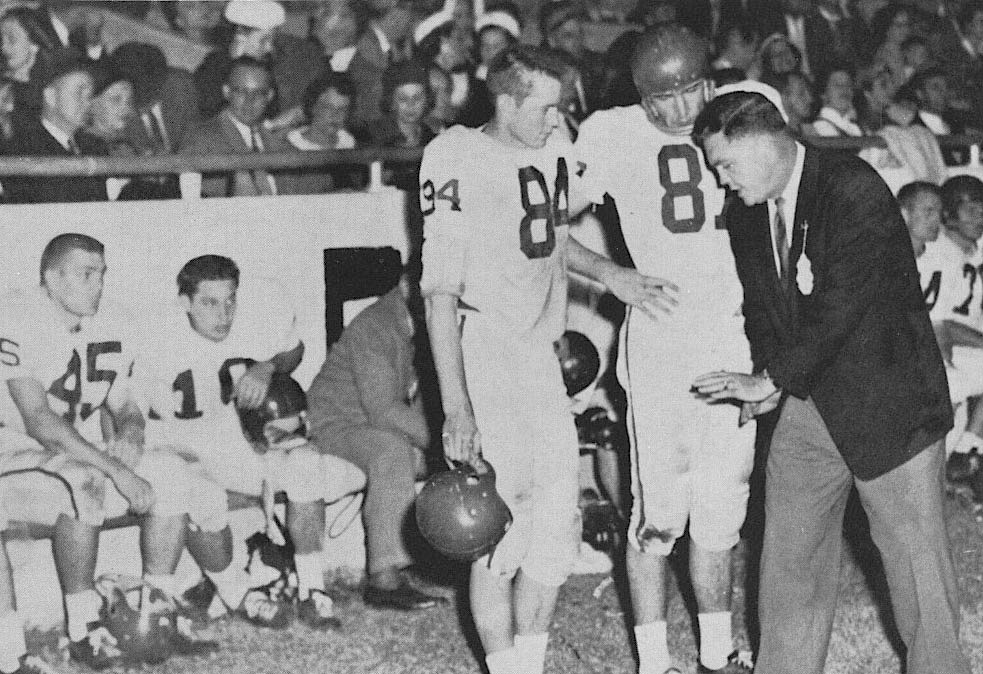
Houston's Bob Borah and Bob Blevins confer with head coach Hal Lahar at Mississippi Veterans Memorial Stadium against Ole Miss

	1	2	3	4	Total
Houston	0	7	0	0	7
#14 Ole Miss	7	0	0	13	20

For its next game, Houston traveled to Mississippi Veterans Memorial Stadium to compete against the Ole Miss Rebels. Having competed against Auburn in the previous game, Ole Miss was the second SEC team that Houston played on its schedule. The Rebels were coached by eleventh-year veteran Johnny Vaught, and entered the contest with a 5–1 overall record (having only lost to Arkansas of the Southwest Conference). Ole Miss was considered to be the favorite, and were nationally ranked as #14 in the AP Poll.

Within the first four minutes of gameplay, Ole Miss scored the first touchdown in a rushing play by senior running back Billy Lott. In the second quarter, Houston's halfback Billy Ray Dickey scored the sole touchdown with a completed pass thrown by quarterback Paul Sweeten. Throughout the third quarter, there were no scores by either side. In the third quarter, Ole Miss defensive end Don Williams recovered a fumble from Houston, and the Rebels gained 48 yards. In the fourth quarter, Ole Miss starting quarterback Ray Brown scored a touchdown for his team by utilizing a quarterback sneak. After Sweeten fumbled at the Houston six-yard line, Ole Miss backup quarterback Bobby Franklin then scored a final touchdown.

With a win against the Cougars, Mississippi continued their season to eventually finish with a 9–1–1 overall record, and a win against Texas in the 1958 Sugar Bowl. Ole Miss finished the season with a #7 national ranking in the AP Poll, and 2nd-place finish in the Southeastern Conference standings.

=== Mississippi Southern ===
Houston remained at Mississippi Veterans Memorial Stadium in Jackson, Mississippi to face the Southern Miss Southerners for the first time in history. Southern Miss was coached by ninth-year head coach Thad Vann, and entered the game with a perfect 7–0 overall record. Halfback Claude King had a stand-out game, where he scored two touchdowns for the Cougars. Right halfback Don Brown of Dayton, Texas also punched in two short touchdown runs. Following its loss to Houston, Southern Miss went on to finish the season with an 8–4 record, and appeared in that season's edition of the Tangerine Bowl.

=== Wichita ===
After its victory over Southern Miss, Houston had finished its out of conference schedule. Traveling to Veterans Stadium, Houston had the opportunity to clinch the 1957 Missouri Valley Conference championship with a victory over conference opponent Wichita. Wichita, now a regular opponent of Houston since the 1949 season, was tied with Houston in the all-time series of 3–3. They were coached by first-year Woody Woodard, and with an abysmal record of 1–6, were coming off only their first win of the season over Drake. It would be their sole win of the season.

=== Tulsa ===
	1	2	3	4	Total
Houston	7	0	0	6	13
Tulsa	0	7	0	0	7

The conclusion of the 1957 season coincided with another victory and a perfect 3–0 conference record for the Cougars. Houston met with the Tulsa Golden Hurricane at Skelly Stadium in Tulsa, who were coached by Bobby Dobbs, and had a 3–5 record. An annual match-up between the two teams had existed since the 1950 season, and this was their eighth meeting. Despite their losing record, the Golden Hurricane were coming off of a three-game winning streak, and the game was designated as Tulsa's homecoming.

The first score of the game came from Houston, when running back Harold Lewis made a 2-yard dive into the Hurricane end zone in the first quarter. Tulsa answered with their own rushing touchdown in the second quarter. However, the game was decided late in the fourth quarter, when a holding call was made against Tulsa, and they were forced to give up fifteen yards. This eventually resulted in Houston's senior halfback Gene Ward scoring another touchdown from a pass by quarterback Don Brown. With a win against Tulsa, Houston improved its all-time series record against the Golden Hurricane to a tie at 4–4.

== Poll rankings ==
Week-to-Week Rankings Legend: ██ Increase in ranking. ██ Decrease in ranking. ██ Not ranked the previous week.
Poll	Pre	Wk 1	Wk 2	Wk 3	Wk 4	Wk 5	Wk 6	Wk 7	Wk 8	Wk 9	Wk 10	Final
AP	NR	14	NR	NR	NR	NR	NR	NR	NR	NR	NR	NR

== Coaching staff ==
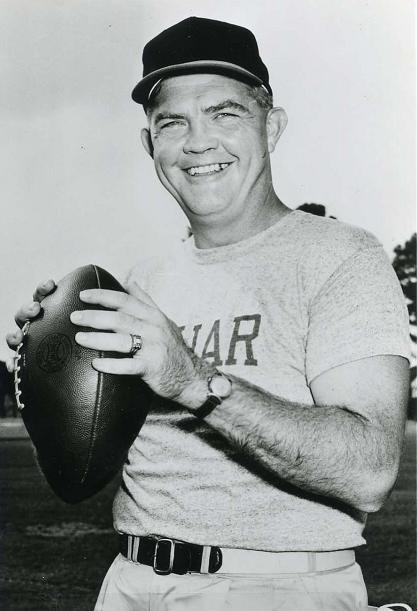
Head Coach Hal Lahar

Name	Position	Alma mater (Year)	Year at Houston
Hal Lahar	Head coach	Oklahoma (1940)	1st
Andy Zubel	Offensive line coach	West Virginia (1949)	1st
Hank Watkins	Defensive line coach	Tulane (1950)	1st
Tex Flanakin	Ends coach	Baylor (1949)	1st
Red Conkright	Defensive backfield coach	Oklahoma (1937)	1st
Casto Ramsey	Offensive backfield coach	King College (1941)	1st
Lovette Hill	Head scout and assistant	Centenary (1931)	10th
Swede Hill	Freshmen coach	Sam Houston State (1939)	1st

== After the season ==
=== NFL draft ===
There were three players from the 1957 season to be drafted to the National Football League in the 1958 NFL draft. It was the eighth time in team history that Houston players were taken in the draft. Tackle Hogan Wharton was taken by the San Francisco 49ers in the eleventh round (131st overall), but remained on the team through the duration of the 1958 season. Similarly, Don McDonald was taken by the Philadelphia Eagles in the twenty-ninth round (340th overall), but did not leave Houston until after the 1959 season. Tackle John Peters was taken by the Green Bay Packers in the thirtieth round (350th overall). While Donnie Caraway, another Houston player was drafted in 1958, he did not play with the Cougars for the 1957 season.

During the 1959 NFL draft several more Houston players from the 1957 season were drafted. Don Brown was taken in the second round (20th overall) by the Los Angeles Rams, Hal Lewis was taken in the seventh round (84th overall) by the Baltimore Colts, and Bob Borah was taken in the twenty-fifth round (296th overall) by the Chicago Bears.

=== Honors ===
Tackle Hogan Wharton was named Lineman of the Year by the Missouri Valley Conference. He was also named to the 1957 All-Missouri Valley Conference Team along with guard Burr Davis, and fullback Harold Lewis. Halfback Don Brown was selected to participate in the 1958 Senior Bowl.
