= 1958 Tangerine Bowl =

The 1958 Tangerine Bowl may refer to:

- 1958 Tangerine Bowl (January), January 1, 1958, game between the East Texas State Lions and the Southern Miss Golden Eagles.
- 1958 Tangerine Bowl (December), December 27, 1958, game between the East Texas State Lions and the Missouri Valley Vikings. Most notable because the Buffalo Bulls unanimously voted to decline a bid to the game (eventually filled by Missouri Valley) when they were notified that the team's two black players would not be allowed to play in the game.
