= 1957 Northern Illinois Huskies football team =

American college football season

1957 Northern Illinois Huskies football
- Conference: Interstate Intercollegiate Athletic Conference
- Record: 2–7 (1–5 IIAC)
- Head coach: Howard Fletcher (2nd season)
- MVP: Alex Gulotta
- Captain: Larry Leadley
- Home stadium: Glidden Field

1957 Interstate Intercollegiate Athletic Conference football standings
	Conf.					Overall
Team	W		L		T	W		L		T
Eastern Michigan $	6	–	0	–	0	6	–	3	–	0
Western Illinois	4	–	2	–	0	5	–	4	–	0
Central Michigan	4	–	2	–	0	4	–	6	–	0
Illinois State Normal	3	–	3	–	0	5	–	3	–	0
Southern Illinois	3	–	3	–	0	5	–	4	–	0
Northern Illinois	1	–	5	–	0	2	–	7	–	0
Eastern Illinois	0	–	6	–	0	0	–	8	–	0
$ – Conference champion

The 1957 Northern Illinois Huskies football team represented Northern Illinois University as a member of the Interstate Intercollegiate Athletic Conference (IIAC) during the 1957 college football season. Led by second-year head coach Howard Fletcher, the Huskies compiled an overall record of 2–7 with a mark of 1–5 in conference play, placing sixth in the IIAC. The team played home games at the 5,500-seat Glidden Field, located on the east end of campus, in DeKalb, Illinois.

== Schedule ==
Date	Opponent	Site	Result	Source
September 21	Wheaton (IL)*	Glidden Field; DeKalb, IL	L 7–25	
September 28	at Beloit	Beloit, WI	W 19–12	
October 5	at Eastern Illinois	Lincoln Field; Charleston, IL	W 27–20	
October 12	Western Illinois	Glidden Field; DeKalb, IL	L 13–33	
October 19	at Central Michigan	Mount Pleasant, MI	L 12–52	
October 26	Illinois State	Glidden Field; DeKalb, IL	L 7–13	
November 2	Eastern Michigan	Glidden Field; DeKalb, IL	L 20–54	
November 9	at Omaha*	Al F. Caniglia Field; Omaha, NE	L 7–14	
November 16	at Southern Illinois	McAndrew Stadium; Carbondale, IL	L 19–45	
*Non-conference game
