= 1957 Tulsa Golden Hurricane football team =

American college football season

1957 Tulsa Golden Hurricane football
- Conference: Missouri Valley Conference
- Record: 4–6 (2–2 MVC)
- Head coach: Bobby Dobbs (3rd season)
- Home stadium: Skelly Stadium

1957 Missouri Valley Conference football standings
	Conf.					Overall
Team	W		L		T	W		L		T
Houston $	3	–	0	–	0	5	–	4	–	1
North Texas State	1	–	0	–	0	5	–	5	–	0
Tulsa	2	–	2	–	0	4	–	6	–	0
Cincinnati	1	–	2	–	0	5	–	4	–	1
Wichita	0	–	3	–	0	1	–	9	–	0
$ – Conference champion

The 1957 Tulsa Golden Hurricane football team represented the University of Tulsa during the 1957 college football season. In their third year under head coach Bobby Dodds, the Golden Hurricane compiled a 4–6 record (2–2 against Missouri Valley Conference opponents), and finished in third place in the conference. The team's statistical leaders included George Cagliola with 239 passing yards, Ronnie Morris with 569 rushing yards, and Dick Brown with 104 receiving yards.

== Schedule ==
Date	Opponent	Site	Result	Attendance	Source
September 21	Hardin–Simmons*	Skelly Stadium; Tulsa, OK	L 0–14	16,500	
September 28	at Arkansas*	Razorback Stadium; Fayetteville, AR	L 14–41	20,000	
October 5	at Pacific (CA)*	Pacific Memorial Stadium; Stockton, CA	L 13–21	16,000	
October 12	at Oklahoma State*	Lewis Field; Stillwater, OK (rivalry)	L 13–28	21,000	
October 19	North Texas State	Skelly Stadium; Tulsa, OK	L 12–14	12,400–12,500	
October 26	Air Force*	Skelly Stadium; Tulsa, OK	W 12–7	8,460–8,463	
November 9	at Texas Tech*	Jones Stadium; Lubbock, TX	W 3–0	18,500	
November 16	Cincinnati	Skelly Stadium; Tulsa, OK	W 12–7	11,148	
November 23	Houston^{†}	Skelly Stadium; Tulsa, OK	L 7–13	13,486	
November 30	at Wichita*	Veterans Field; Wichita, KS	W 24–0	4,844	
*Non-conference game; ^{†}Homecoming; Source:

== After the season ==
=== 1957 NFL draft ===
The following Golden Hurricane players were selected in the 1950 NFL draft following the season.

Round	Pick	Player	Position	NFL club
11	127	Dick Hughes	Halfback	Pittsburgh Steelers
19	229	Ronnie Morris	Back	New York Giants
