= 1957 Drake Bulldogs football team =

American college football season

1957 Drake Bulldogs football

Sun Bowl, L 20–34 vs. Louisville
- Conference: Independent
- Record: 7–2
- Head coach: Warren Gaer (9th season)
- Home stadium: Drake Stadium

1957 Midwestern major college football independents records
	Conf.			Overall
Team	W	L	T	W		L		T
No. 10 Notre Dame		–		7	–	3	–	0
Drake		–		7	–	2	–	0
Detroit		–		6	–	3	–	0
Dayton		–		6	–	3	–	1
Xavier		–		5	–	5	–	0
Marquette		–		0	–	10	–	0
Rankings from AP poll

The 1957 Drake Bulldogs football team was an American football team that represented Drake University as an independent during the 1957 college football season. In its ninth season under head coach Warren Gaer, the team compiled a 7–2 record, lost to Louisville in the 1958 Sun Bowl, and outscored all opponents by a total of 185 to 112. The team played its home games at Drake Stadium in Des Moines, Iowa.

== Schedule ==
Date	Time	Opponent	Site	Result	Attendance	Source
September 14		Iowa State Teachers	Drake Stadium; Des Moines, IA	W 34–12	8,000	
September 28		South Dakota State	Drake Stadium; Des Moines, IA	W 25–7	12,000	
October 5		at North Texas State	Fouts Field; Denton, TX	W 19–6		
October 12		at Washington University	Francis Field; St. Louis, MO	W 19–7	6,000	
October 26		at Bradley	Peoria Stadium; Peoria, IL	W 21–13	4,200	
November 2		Iowa State	Drake Stadium; Des Moines, IA	W 20–0	6,557	
November 9		at Wichita	Veterans Field; Wichita, KS	L 7–14	6,000	
November 16	1:00 p.m.	West Texas State	Drake Stadium; Des Moines, IA	W 20–19	2,000	
January 1, 1958		vs. Louisville	Kidd Field; El Paso, TX (Sun Bowl)	L 20–34	9,000	
All times are in Central time; Source:
