= 1957 West Texas State Buffaloes football team =

American college football season

1957 West Texas State Buffaloes football
- Conference: Border Conference
- Record: 7–3 (3–1 Border)
- Head coach: Frank Kimbrough (11th season)
- Home stadium: Buffalo Stadium

1957 Border Conference football standings
	Conf.					Overall
Team	W		L		T	W		L		T
No. 12 Arizona State $	4	–	0	–	0	10	–	0	–	0
West Texas State	3	–	1	–	0	7	–	3	–	0
Texas Western	3	–	2	–	0	6	–	3	–	0
Hardin–Simmons	3	–	2	–	0	5	–	5	–	0
New Mexico A&M	0	–	4	–	0	3	–	7	–	0
Arizona	0	–	4	–	0	1	–	8	–	1
$ – Conference champion; Rankings from AP poll

The 1957 West Texas State Buffaloes football team represented West Texas State College—now known as West Texas A&M University—as a member of the Border Conference during the 1957 college football season. Led by Frank Kimbrough in his 11th and final season as head coach, the Buffaloes compiled an overall record of 7–3 with a mark of 3–1 in conference play, placing second in the Border Conference.

== Schedule ==
Date	Time	Opponent	Site	Result	Attendance	Source
September 14		McMurry*	Buffalo Stadium; Canyon, TX	W 20–7	4,000	
September 21		at Texas Tech*	Jones Stadium; Lubbock, TX	W 19–0	22,000	
September 28		at Texas Western	Kidd Field; El Paso, TX	L 12–20		
October 5		vs. Mississippi Southern*	Amarillo Stadium; Amarillo, TX	L 0–34	10,000	
October 12	8:00 p.m.	at Trinity (TX)*	Alamo Stadium; San Antonio, TX	W 27–20		
October 19		at New Mexico A&M	Memorial Stadium; Las Cruces, NM	W 35–7		
October 26		Hardin–Simmons^{†}	Buffalo Stadium; Canyon, TX	W 39–19		
November 2		at Arizona	Arizona Stadium; Tucson, AZ	W 21–20	13,000	
November 9		Abilene Christian*	Buffalo Stadium; Canyon, TX	W 12–2	4,500	
November 16	1:00 p.m.	at Drake*	Drake Stadium; Des Moines, IA	L 19–20	2,000	
*Non-conference game; ^{†}Homecoming; All times are in Central time
