= 1957 Eastern Michigan Hurons football team =

American college football season

1957 Eastern Michigan Hurons football

IIAC champion
- Conference: Interstate Intercollegiate Athletic Conference
- Record: 6–3 (6–0 IIAC)
- Head coach: Fred Trosko (6th season)
- MVP: Kerry Keating
- Captain: Walter Gerald Brown
- Home stadium: Briggs Field

1957 Interstate Intercollegiate Athletic Conference football standings
	Conf.					Overall
Team	W		L		T	W		L		T
Eastern Michigan $	6	–	0	–	0	6	–	3	–	0
Western Illinois	4	–	2	–	0	5	–	4	–	0
Central Michigan	4	–	2	–	0	4	–	6	–	0
Illinois State Normal	3	–	3	–	0	5	–	3	–	0
Southern Illinois	3	–	3	–	0	5	–	4	–	0
Northern Illinois	1	–	5	–	0	2	–	7	–	0
Eastern Illinois	0	–	6	–	0	0	–	8	–	0
$ – Conference champion

The 1957 Eastern Michigan Hurons football team represented Eastern Michigan College (renamed Eastern Michigan University in 1959) in the Interstate Intercollegiate Athletic Conference (IIAC) during the 1957 college football season. In their sixth season under head coach Fred Trosko, the Hurons compiled a 6–3 record (6–0 against IIAC opponents), won the IIAC championship, and outscored their opponents, 237 to 127. The team defeated all six of its conference opponents by at least three touchdowns. Dr. Walter Gerald Brown was the team captain. Kerry Keating led the team with 563 yards of total offense, 563 rushing yards, 153 receiving yards, 15 touchdowns, and 90 points scored. Keating also received the team's most valuable player award. It was the last conference championship season for three decades.

== Schedule ==
Date	Opponent	Site	Result	Source
September 21	Hope*	Briggs Field; Ypsilanti, MI	L 6–19	
September 27	Illinois State Normal	Briggs Field; Ypsilanti, MI	W 33–14	
October 4	at Youngstown*	Briggs Field; Ypsilanti, MI	L 6–13	
October 11	Central Michigan	Briggs Field; Ypsilanti, MI (rivalry)	W 39–6	
October 19	at Eastern Illinois	Lincoln Field; Charleston, IL	W 39–0	
October 26	Southern Illinois^{†}	Briggs Field; Ypsilanti, MI	W 21–7	
November 2	at Northern Illinois	Glidden Field; DeKalb, IL	W 54–20	
November 9	Western Illinois	Briggs Field; Ypsilanti, MI	W 26–0	
November 16	at Saint Joseph's (IN)*	Rensselaer, IN	L 13–48	
*Non-conference game; ^{†}Homecoming
