= 1957 San Jose State Spartans football team =

American college football season

1957 San Jose State Spartans football
- Conference: Independent
- Record: 3–7
- Head coach: Bob Titchenal (1st season)
- Home stadium: Spartan Stadium

1957 Western major college football independents records
	Conf.			Overall
Team	W	L	T	W		L		T
Pacific (CA)		–		5	–	3	–	2
Air Force		–		3	–	6	–	1
San Jose State		–		3	–	7	–	0

The 1957 San Jose State Spartans football team represented San Jose State College—now known as San Jose State University—as an independent during the 1957 college football season. Led by first-year head coach Bob Titchenal, the Spartans compiled a record of 3–7 and were outscored by opponents 196 to 123. The team played home games at Spartan Stadium in San Jose, California.

== Schedule ==
Date	Opponent	Site	Result	Attendance	Source
September 21	at Stanford	Stanford Stadium; Stanford, CA (rivalry)	L 7–46	26,000	
September 27	at Denver	Hilltop Stadium; Denver, CO	W 27–20	13,287	
October 5	Arizona State	Spartan Stadium; San Jose, CA	L 6–44	10,000–10,600	
October 12	at Oregon	Hayward Field; Eugene, OR	L 0–26	10,300	
October 19	San Diego State	Spartan Stadium; San Jose, CA	W 46–0	8,000	
October 26	North Texas State	Spartan Stadium; San Jose, CA	L 6–12	7,500	
November 2	at Cal Poly	Mustang Stadium; San Luis Obispo, A	L 7–14	6,500	
November 9	Pacific (CA)^{†}	Spartan Stadium; San Jose, CA (Victory Bell)	L 6–21	14,500	
November 16	at Fresno State	Ratcliffe Stadium; Fresno, CA (rivalry)	L 6–13	8,570–9,000	
November 30	at Hawaii	Honolulu Stadium; Honolulu, Territory of Hawaii (rivalry)	W 12–0	13,000	
^{†}Homecoming; Source:

== Team players in the NFL ==
The following San Jose State players were selected in the 1958 NFL draft.

Player	Position	Round	Overall	NFL team
Hal Boutte	End	12	145	Detroit Lions
Bill Atkins	Tackle	25	296	Los Angeles Rams

The following finished their San Jose State career in 1957, were not drafted, but played in the NFL.

Player	Position	First NFL team
Tony Teresa	Halfback	1958 San Francisco 49ers
