= 1957 Bowling Green Falcons football team =

American college football season

1957 Bowling Green Falcons football
- Conference: Mid-American Conference
- Record: 6–1–2 (3–1–2 MAC)
- Head coach: Doyt Perry (3rd season)
- MVP: Tim Murnen
- Captain: Tim Murnen
- Home stadium: University Stadium

1957 Mid-American Conference football standings
	Conf.					Overall
Team	W		L		T	W		L		T
Miami (OH) $	5	–	0	–	0	6	–	3	–	0
Bowling Green	3	–	1	–	2	6	–	1	–	2
Marshall	4	–	2	–	0	6	–	3	–	0
Toledo	3	–	2	–	0	5	–	4	–	0
Western Michigan	1	–	4	–	1	4	–	4	–	1
Ohio	1	–	4	–	1	2	–	6	–	1
Kent State	1	–	5	–	0	3	–	6	–	0
$ – Conference champion

The 1957 Bowling Green Falcons football team was an American football team that represented Bowling Green State University in the Mid-American Conference (MAC) during the 1957 college football season. In its third season under head coach Doyt Perry, it compiled a 6–1–2 record (3–1–2 against MAC opponents), held seven of nine opponents to seven or fewer points, outscored all by a combined 167 to 55 and finished in second place in the MAC.

The Falcon's statistical leaders were Don Nehlen with 499 passing yards, Bob Ramlow with 492 rushing yards and Ray Reese with 185 receiving yards. Linebacker Tim Murnen was the captain and Most Valuable Player It tied a franchise record set by the 1955 team by allowing only eight touchdowns in the season.

== Schedule ==
Date	Opponent	Site	Result	Attendance	Source
September 21	Baldwin–Wallace*	University Stadium; Bowling Green, OH	W 60–7		
September 28	at Xavier*	Xavier Stadium; Cincinnati, OH	W 16–0	10,500	
October 5	at Delaware*	Delaware Stadium; Newark, DE	W 7–0	6,000	
October 12	Western Michigan	University Stadium; Bowling Green, OH	T 14–14		
October 19	Toledo	University Stadium; Bowling Green, OH (rivalry)	W 29–0		
October 26	at Kent State	Memorial Stadium; Kent, OH (rivalry)	W 13–7		
November 2	Miami (OH)	University Stadium; Bowling Green, OH	L 7–13		
November 9	at Ohio	Peden Stadium; Athens, OH	T 7–7		
November 16	at Marshall	Fairfield Stadium; Huntington, WV	W 14–7		
*Non-conference game
