= 1957 Central Michigan Chippewas football team =

American college football season

1957 Central Michigan Chippewas football
- Conference: Interstate Intercollegiate Athletic Conference
- Record: 4–6 (4–2 IIAC)
- Head coach: Kenneth Kelly (7th season)
- MVP: Gordon Rinquist
- Home stadium: Alumni Field

1957 Interstate Intercollegiate Athletic Conference football standings
	Conf.					Overall
Team	W		L		T	W		L		T
Eastern Michigan $	6	–	0	–	0	6	–	3	–	0
Western Illinois	4	–	2	–	0	5	–	4	–	0
Central Michigan	4	–	2	–	0	4	–	6	–	0
Illinois State Normal	3	–	3	–	0	5	–	3	–	0
Southern Illinois	3	–	3	–	0	5	–	4	–	0
Northern Illinois	1	–	5	–	0	2	–	7	–	0
Eastern Illinois	0	–	6	–	0	0	–	8	–	0
$ – Conference champion

The 1957 Central Michigan Chippewas football team represented Central Michigan College, which was renamed Central Michigan University in 1959, in the Interstate Intercollegiate Athletic Conference (IIAC) during the 1957 college football season. In their seventh season under head coach Kenneth Kelly, the Chippewas compiled a 4–6 record (4–2 against IIAC opponents) and were outscored by their opponents by a combined total of 222 to 220.

The team's statistical leaders included Herb Kipke with 511 passing yards and Walter Beach with 1,084 rushing yards and 313 receiving yards. Guard Gordon Rinquist received the team's Most Valuable Player award. Three Central Michigan players (Beach, Rinquist, and fullback Theo Winieckie) received first-team honors on the All-IIAC team.

== Schedule ==
Date	Opponent	Site	Result	Attendance	Source
September 14	vs. Bradley*	Arthur Hill Stadium; Saginaw, MI	L 7–14		
September 21	Western Michigan*	Alumni Field; Mount Pleasant, MI (rivalry)	L 0–33		
September 28	Hillsdale*	Alumni Field; Mount Pleasant, MI	L 14–35		
October 5	at Illinois State Normal	Normal, IL	L 20–24		
October 11	at Eastern Michigan	Briggs Field; Ypsilanti, MI (rivalry)	L 6–39		
October 19	Northern Illinois^{†}	Alumni Field; Mount Pleasant, MI	W 52–12		
October 26	at Louisville*	Fairgrounds Stadium; Louisville, KY	L 0–40	5,500	
November 2	Eastern Illinois	Alumni Field; Mount Pleasant, MI	W 61–6		
November 9	at Southern Illinois	McAndrew Stadium; Carbondale, IL	W 21–12		
November 16	Western Illinois	Alumni Field; Mount Pleasant, MI	W 39–7		
*Non-conference game; ^{†}Homecoming
