= 1957 Delaware Fightin' Blue Hens football team =

American college football season

1957 Delaware Fightin' Blue Hens football
- Conference: Independent
- Record: 4–3
- Head coach: David M. Nelson (7th season)
- Captain: Joe Harvanik
- Home stadium: Delaware Stadium

1957 Southern non-major college football independents records
	Conf.			Overall
Team	W	L	T	W		L		T
Louisville		–		9	–	1	–	0
Mississippi Southern		–		8	–	3	–	0
Sewanee		–		5	–	2	–	1
Tampa		–		6	–	3	–	0
Abilene Christian		–		5	–	3	–	1
Delaware		–		4	–	3	–	0
Memphis State		–		6	–	4	–	0
Chattanooga		–		4	–	5	–	1
Arkansas State		–		4	–	5	–	0
Howard (AL)		–		4	–	5	–	0
Trinity (TX)		–		3	–	5	–	0
Washington and Lee		–		0	–	8	–	0

The 1957 Delaware Fightin' Blue Hens football team was an American football team that represented the University of Delaware as an independent during the 1957 college football season. In its seventh season under head coach David M. Nelson, the team compiled a 4–3 record and outscored opponents by a total of 210 to 84. Joe Harvanik was the team captain.

Delaware did not play its scheduled date with Lafayette on Oct. 12, as an outbreak of Asian flu affecting more than 20 of the Leopards' players prompted them to cancel the game.

The Blue Hens played their home games at Delaware Stadium on the university campus in Newark, Delaware.

== Schedule ==
Date	Opponent	Site	Result	Attendance	Source
September 28	Lehigh	Delaware Stadium; Newark, DE (rivalry)	L 14–19	7,140	
October 5	Bowling Green	Delaware Stadium; Newark, DE	L 0–7	6,000	
October 12	at Lafayette	Fisher Field; Easton, PA	canceled		
October 19	New Hampshire	Delaware Stadium; Newark, DE	W 59–6	6,200	
October 26	at Connecticut	Memorial Stadium; Storrs, CT	L 9–13	7,643	
November 2	Rutgers	Rutgers Stadium; Piscataway, NJ	W 23–19	5,500	
November 9	Temple	Delaware Stadium; Newark, DE	W 71–7	6,000	
November 16	at Bucknell	Memorial Stadium; Lewisburg, PA	W 34–13	4,000	
