= 1957 Southern Illinois Salukis football team =

American college football season

1957 Southern Illinois Salukis football
- Conference: Interstate Intercollegiate Athletic Conference
- Record: 5–4 (3–3 IIAC)
- Head coach: Albert Kawal (3rd season)
- Home stadium: McAndrew Stadium

1957 Interstate Intercollegiate Athletic Conference football standings
	Conf.					Overall
Team	W		L		T	W		L		T
Eastern Michigan $	6	–	0	–	0	6	–	3	–	0
Western Illinois	4	–	2	–	0	5	–	4	–	0
Central Michigan	4	–	2	–	0	4	–	6	–	0
Illinois State Normal	3	–	3	–	0	5	–	3	–	0
Southern Illinois	3	–	3	–	0	5	–	4	–	0
Northern Illinois	1	–	5	–	0	2	–	7	–	0
Eastern Illinois	0	–	6	–	0	0	–	8	–	0
$ – Conference champion

The 1957 Southern Illinois Salukis football team was an American football team that represented Southern Illinois University (now known as Southern Illinois University Carbondale) in the Interstate Intercollegiate Athletic Conference (IIAC) during the 1957 college football season. Under third-year head coach Albert Kawal, the team compiled a 5–4 record. The team played its home games at McAndrew Stadium in Carbondale, Illinois.

== Schedule ==
Date	Opponent	Site	Result	Source
September 21	at Austin Peay*	Clarksville Municipal Stadium; Clarksville, TN	W 25–12	
September 28	Arkansas State*	McAndrew Stadium; Carbondale, IL	L 6–13	
October 4	at Western Illinois	Hanson Field; Macomb, IL	L 13–23	
October 12	Eastern Illinois	McAndrew Stadium; Carbondale, IL	W 27–6	
October 19	at Illinois State Normal	McCormick Field; Normal, IL	W 28–21	
October 26	at Eastern Michigan	Briggs Field; Ypsilanti, MI	L 7–21	
November 9	Central Michigan	McAndrew Stadium; Carbondale, IL	L 12–21	
November 16	Northern Illinois	McAndrew Stadium; Carbondale, IL	W 45–19	
November 23	at Great Lakes Naval*	Great Lakes, IL	W 38–4	
*Non-conference game
