= 1957 Toledo Rockets football team =

American college football season

1957 Toledo Rockets football
- Conference: Mid-American Conference
- Record: 5–4 (3–2 MAC)
- Head coach: Harry Larche (1st season)
- Home stadium: Glass Bowl

1957 Mid-American Conference football standings
	Conf.					Overall
Team	W		L		T	W		L		T
Miami (OH) $	5	–	0	–	0	6	–	3	–	0
Bowling Green	3	–	1	–	2	6	–	1	–	2
Marshall	4	–	2	–	0	6	–	3	–	0
Toledo	3	–	2	–	0	5	–	4	–	0
Western Michigan	1	–	4	–	1	4	–	4	–	1
Ohio	1	–	4	–	1	2	–	6	–	1
Kent State	1	–	5	–	0	3	–	6	–	0
$ – Conference champion

The 1957 Toledo Rockets football team was an American football team that represented Toledo University in the Mid-American Conference (MAC) during the 1957 college football season. In their first season under head coach Harry Larche, the Rockets compiled a 5–4 record (3–2 against MAC opponents), finished in fourth place in the MAC, and were outscored by their opponents by a combined total of 147 to 136.

The team's statistical leaders included Sam Tisci with 760 passing yards, Norm Billingslea with 565 rushing yards, and Gene Cook with 495 receiving yards.

== Schedule ==
Date	Opponent	Site	Result
September 21	at Eastern Kentucky*	Richmond, KY	W 7–0
September 28	Ohio	Glass Bowl; Toledo, OH	W 14–6
October 5	at Louisville*	Fairgrounds Stadium; Louisville, KY	L 20–48
October 12	Marshall	Glass Bowl; Toledo, OH	L 7–14
October 19	at Bowling Green	University Stadium; Bowling Green, OH (rivalry)	L 0–29
October 26	Western Michigan	Glass Bowl; Toledo, OH	W 27–16
November 2	Kent State	Glass Bowl; Toledo, OH	W 21–7
November 9	at Xavier*	Corcoran Stadium; Cincinnati, OH	L 7–20
November 16	Muskingum*	Glass Bowl; Toledo, OH	W 33–7
*Non-conference game

== After the season ==
=== NFL draft ===
The following Rocket was selected in the 1958 NFL draft following the season.

Round	Pick	Player	Position	NFL club
13	147	Gene Cook	End	Green Bay Packers
