= 1957 Air Force Falcons football team =

American college football season

1957 Air Force Falcons football
- Conference: Independent
- Record: 3–6–1
- Head coach: Buck Shaw (2nd season)
- Captains: Brock Strom; Charles Zaleski
- Home stadium: DU Stadium

1957 Western major college football independents records
	Conf.			Overall
Team	W	L	T	W		L		T
Pacific (CA)		–		5	–	3	–	2
Air Force		–		3	–	6	–	1
San Jose State		–		3	–	7	–	0

The 1957 Air Force Falcons football team represented the United States Air Force Academy as an independent during the 1957 college football season. For its first three years, the academy was housed at Lowry Air Force Base, Colorado, adjacent to Denver, until August 1958. Until Falcon Stadium opened in 1962, Air Force played home games at DU Stadium at the University of Denver.

Led by second-year head coach Buck Shaw, it was the third season for the football program. The Falcons finished with a record of 3–6–1.

Air Force did not play Army or Navy this season; Army was first played in 1959 and Navy in 1960.

== Schedule ==
Date	Time	Opponent	Site	Result	Attendance	Source
September 20		at UCLA	Los Angeles Memorial Coliseum; Los Angeles, CA	L 0–47	33,293	
September 28		Occidental	DU Stadium; Denver, CO	W 40–6	6,922	
October 5		Detroit	DU Stadium; Denver, CO	W 19–12	6,629	
October 11		at George Washington	Griffith Stadium; Washington, DC	L 0–20	12,000	
October 26		at Tulsa	Skelly Stadium; Tulsa, OK	L 7–12	8,463	
November 2		at Wyoming	War Memorial Stadium; Laramie, WY	T 7–7	7,600–7,678	
November 9		at Denver	DU Stadium; Denver, CO	L 14–26	13,560	
November 16	2:00 pm	at Utah	Ute Stadium; Salt Lake City, UT	L 0–34	11,440	
November 23		New Mexico	DU Stadium; Denver, CO	W 34–21	5,500	
November 30		Colorado State	DU Stadium; Denver, CO (rivalry)	L 7–20	5,879	
All times are in Mountain time; Source:

== Roster ==
1957 Air Force Falcons football team roster
Players
Coaches
Offense

Pos.	#	Name	Class
E		Tom Jozwiak	So
OL		Brock Strom	Jr

Defense

Pos.	#	Name	Class
DL		Dave Phillips	Jr

Special teams

Pos.	#	Name	Class

Head coach

- Buck Shaw

Coordinators/assistant coaches

Legend

- (C) Team captain
- (S) Suspended
- (I) Ineligible
- Injured
- Redshirt
