= 1957 Texas Western Miners football team =

American college football season

1957 Texas Western Miners football
- Conference: Border Conference
- Record: 6–3 (3–2 Border)
- Head coach: Ben Collins (1st season)
- Home stadium: Kidd Field

1957 Border Conference football standings
| | Conf. | | | | | Overall |
| Team | W | | L | | T | W | | L | | T |
|---|---|---|---|---|---|---|---|---|---|---|
| No. 12 Arizona State $ | 4 | – | 0 | – | 0 | 10 | – | 0 | – | 0 |
| West Texas State | 3 | – | 1 | – | 0 | 7 | – | 3 | – | 0 |
| Texas Western | 3 | – | 2 | – | 0 | 6 | – | 3 | – | 0 |
| Hardin–Simmons | 3 | – | 2 | – | 0 | 5 | – | 5 | – | 0 |
| New Mexico A&M | 0 | – | 4 | – | 0 | 3 | – | 7 | – | 0 |
| Arizona | 0 | – | 4 | – | 0 | 1 | – | 8 | – | 1 |
$ – Conference champion; Rankings from AP poll

The 1957 Texas Western Miners football team was an American football team that represented Texas Western College (now known as University of Texas at El Paso) as a member of the Border Conference during the 1957 college football season. In its first season under head coach Ben Collins, the team compiled a 6–3 record (3–2 against Border Conference opponents), finished third in the conference, and outscored all opponents by a total of 202 to 168.

== Schedule ==
| Date | Opponent | Site | Result | Attendance | Source |
|---|---|---|---|---|---|
| September 21 | North Texas State* | Kidd Field; El Paso, TX | W 14–13 | | |
| September 28 | West Texas State | Kidd Field; El Paso, TX | W 20–12 | | |
| October 5 | at New Mexico* | Zimmerman Field; Albuquerque, NM | W 15–13 | | |
| October 12 | Texas Tech* | Kidd Field; El Paso, TX | W 26–14 | 11,000 | |
| October 26 | New Mexico A&M | Kidd Field; El Paso, TX (rivalry) | W 42–12 | 8,500 | |
| November 2 | at Hardin–Simmons | Parramore Field; Abilene, TX | L 20–33 | 4,500 | |
| November 9 | Arizona State^{†} | Kidd Field; El Paso, TX | L 7–43 | 11,300 | |
| November 16 | at Arizona | Arizona Stadium; Tucson, AZ | W 51–14 | 12,000 | |
| November 23 | at Trinity (TX)* | Alamo Stadium; San Antonio, TX | L 7–14 | | |
*Non-conference game; ^{†}Homecoming
