= 1957 Cincinnati Bearcats football team =

American college football season

1957 Cincinnati Bearcats football
- Conference: Missouri Valley Conference
- Record: 5–4–1 (1–2 MVC)
- Head coach: George Blackburn (3rd season)
- Captains: Dick Seomin; Ron Couch
- Home stadium: Nippert Stadium

1957 Missouri Valley Conference football standings
	Conf.					Overall
Team	W		L		T	W		L		T
Houston $	3	–	0	–	0	5	–	4	–	1
North Texas State	1	–	0	–	0	5	–	5	–	0
Tulsa	2	–	2	–	0	4	–	6	–	0
Cincinnati	1	–	2	–	0	5	–	4	–	1
Wichita	0	–	3	–	0	1	–	9	–	0
$ – Conference champion

The 1957 Cincinnati Bearcats football team represented the University of Cincinnati in the Missouri Valley Conference (MVC) during the 1957 college football season. Led by third-year head coach George Blackburn, the Bearcats compiled an overall record of 5–4–1 with a mark of 1–2 in conference play, placing fourth in the MVC. The team played home games at Nippert Stadium in Cincinnati.

== Schedule ==
Date	Opponent	Site	Result	Attendance	Source
September 21	Dayton*	Nippert Stadium; Cincinnati, OH	T 13–13	19,000	
September 28	at Wichita	Veterans Field; Wichita, KS	W 19–13	10,502	
October 5	Houston	Nippert Stadium; Cincinnati, OH	L 0–7	15,000–18,000	
October 12	Xavier*	Nippert Stadium; Cincinnati, OH (rivalry)	W 23–14	27,500	
October 19	Marquette*	Nippert Stadium; Cincinnati, OH	W 14–0	12,000–12,500	
October 26	Pacific (CA)*^{†}	Nippert Stadium; Cincinnati, OH	W 7–2	12,000	
November 2	Detroit*	Nippert Stadium; Cincinnati, OH	L 12–20	17,000	
November 9	at Indiana*	Memorial Stadium; Bloomington, IN	W 21–0	17,000	
November 16	at Tulsa	Skelly Stadium; Tulsa, OK	L 7–12	11,148	
November 28	Miami (OH)*	Nippert Stadium; Cincinnati, OH (Victory Bell)	L 14–20		
*Non-conference game; ^{†}Homecoming; Source:
