= 1957 Xavier Musketeers football team =

American college football season

1957 Xavier Musketeers football
- Conference: Independent
- Record: 5–5
- Head coach: Harry Connolly (3rd season)
- Home stadium: Xavier Stadium

1957 Midwestern major college football independents records
	Conf.			Overall
Team	W	L	T	W		L		T
No. 10 Notre Dame		–		7	–	3	–	0
Drake		–		7	–	2	–	0
Detroit		–		6	–	3	–	0
Dayton		–		6	–	3	–	1
Xavier		–		5	–	5	–	0
Marquette		–		0	–	10	–	0
Rankings from AP poll

The 1957 Xavier Musketeers football team was an American football team that represented Xavier University as an independent during the 1957 college football season. In their fourth season under head coach Harry Connolly, the Musketeers compiled a 5–5 record. They team played their home games at Xavier Stadium in Cincinnati, Ohio.

== Schedule ==
Date	Opponent	Site	Result	Attendance	Source
September 15	Saint Joseph's (IN)	Xavier Stadium; Cincinnati, OH	W 31–13	10,300	
September 21	Kent State	Xavier Stadium; Cincinnati, OH	W 13–7		
September 28	Bowling Green	Xavier Stadium; Cincinnati, OH	L 0–16	10,500	
October 5	at Miami (OH)	Miami Field; Oxford, OH	W 39–19		
October 12	at Cincinnati	Nippert Stadium; Cincinnati, OH (rivalry)	L 14–23	27,500	
October 19	at Detroit	University of Detroit Stadium; Detroit, MI	L 20–30	14,891	
October 26	at Dayton	UD Stadium; Dayton, OH	L 13–24	8,500	
November 2	Marshall	Xavier Stadium; Cincinnati, OH	W 18–0		
November 9	Toledo	Xavier Stadium; Cincinnati, OH	W 20–7		
November 16	at Kentucky	McLean Stadium; Lexington, KY	L 0–27	20,000	
