= 1958 Sun Bowl (January) =

Drake Bulldogs	Louisville Cardinals
(7–1)	(8–1)
Independent	Independent
20	34
Head coach: Warren Gaer	Head coach: Frank Camp
	1	2	3	4	Total
Drake	7	7	0	6	20
Louisville	7	14	7	6	34
- Date: January 1, 1958
- Season: 1957
- Stadium: Kidd Field
- Location: El Paso, TX
- MVP: Ken Porco (Louisville)
- National anthem: Marching Bands
- Referee: D.M. Longnecker
- Halftime show: Marching Bands
- Attendance: 20,000

The 1958 Sun Bowl was a college football bowl game played between Drake Bulldogs and Louisville Cardinals at Kidd Field in El Paso, Texas.

== Background ==
This was Louisville's first ever bowl appearance. This was Drake's first bowl game since 1949.

== Scoring summary ==
Ken Porco carried the ball 20 times for 119 yards and one touchdown in an MVP effort, after Lenny Lyles (their lead rusher of the season) was injured on the first play.

First Quarter

- Drake - Labrasea 2-yard touchdown run (Leeman kick) (7–0 Drake)
- Louisville - Cain 4-yard touchdown run (Young kick) (Tied 7–7)

Second Quarter

- Drake - Labrasea 17-yard touchdown run (Leeman kick) (14–7 Drake)
- Louisville - Ed Young 37-yard touchdown pass from Dale Orem (Young kick) (Tied 14–14)
- Louisville - Pete Bryant 4-yard touchdown run (Young kick) (21–14 Louisville)

Third Quarter

- Louisville - Porco 2-yard touchdown run (Young kick) (28–14 Louisville)

Fourth Quarter

- Drake - Kinzel 55-yard touchdown pass from Roger La Brasca (kick failed) (28–20 Louisville)
- Louisville - Young 20-yard touchdown pass from Pete Bryant (kick failed) (34–20 Louisville)

== Statistics ==
Statistics	Louisville	Drake
First downs	14	16
Yards rushing	228	176
Yards passing	148	140
Total yards	376	316
Punts-Average	5–34.2	4–25.8
Fumbles-Lost	1–0	3–2
Interceptions Thrown	0	1
