= 1957 Tampa Spartans football team =

American college football season

1957 Tampa Spartans football
- Conference: Independent
- Record: 6–3
- Head coach: Marcelino Huerta (6th season)
- Home stadium: Phillips Field

1957 Southern non-major college football independents records
	Conf.			Overall
Team	W	L	T	W		L		T
Louisville		–		9	–	1	–	0
Mississippi Southern		–		8	–	3	–	0
Sewanee		–		5	–	2	–	1
Tampa		–		6	–	3	–	0
Abilene Christian		–		5	–	3	–	1
Delaware		–		4	–	3	–	0
Memphis State		–		6	–	4	–	0
Chattanooga		–		4	–	5	–	1
Arkansas State		–		4	–	5	–	0
Howard (AL)		–		4	–	5	–	0
Trinity (TX)		–		3	–	5	–	0
Washington and Lee		–		0	–	8	–	0

The 1957 Tampa Spartans football team represented the University of Tampa in the 1957 college football season. It was the Spartans' 21st season. The team was led by head coach Marcelino Huerta, in his sixth year, and played their home games at Phillips Field in Tampa, Florida. They finished with a record of six wins and three losses (6–3).

== Schedule ==
Date	Opponent	Site	Result	Attendance	Source
September 21	VMI	Phillips Field; Tampa, FL	L 0–7		
September 28	Troy State	Phillips Field; Tampa, FL	W 53–7	6,000	
October 12	Presbyterian	Phillips Field; Tampa, FL	W 39–14		
October 26	at Wofford	Snyder Field; Spartanburg, SC	L 6–14		
November 2	Southeastern Louisiana	Phillips Field; Tampa, FL	W 33–13		
November 9	at Jacksonville State	College Bowl; Jacksonville, AL	W 14–13		
November 16	Appalachian State	Phillips Field; Tampa, FL	W 26–9		
November 23	Delta State	Phillips Field; Tampa, FL	W 27–26	7,000	
November 30	Florida State	Phillips Field; Tampa, FL	L 7–21	12,000	
