= 1957 Oklahoma State Cowboys football team =

American college football season

1957 Oklahoma State Cowboys football
- Conference: Independent
- Record: 6–3–1
- Head coach: Cliff Speegle (3rd season)
- Home stadium: Lewis Field

1957 Southern major college football independents records
	Conf.			Overall
Team	W	L	T	W		L		T
No. 5 Navy		–		9	–	1	–	1
Oklahoma State		–		6	–	3	–	1
Miami (FL)		–		5	–	4	–	1
Florida State		–		4	–	6	–	0
Texas Tech		–		2	–	8	–	0
Rankings from AP poll

The 1957 Oklahoma State Cowboys football team represented Oklahoma State University in the 1957 college football season. This was the 57th year of football at OSU and the third under Cliff Speegle. The Cowboys played their home games at Lewis Field in Stillwater, Oklahoma. Oklahoma A&M officially changed its name to Oklahoma State University prior to this season, and the program competed their first season as an independent after over three decades in the Missouri Valley Conference. The Cowboys finished the season with a 6–3–1 record.

== Schedule ==
Date	Opponent	Site	Result	Attendance	Source
September 21	at Arkansas	War Memorial Stadium; Little Rock, AR	L 0–12	24,000	
September 28	at North Texas State	Fouts Field; Denton, TX	W 25–19	8,000	
October 5	Wichita	Lewis Field; Stillwater, OK	W 26–0	15,000	
October 12	Tulsa	Lewis Field; Stillwater, OK (rivalry)	W 28–13	21,000	
October 19	at Houston	Rice Stadium; Houston, TX	T 6–6	20,000	
November 2	Texas Tech^{†}	Lewis Field; Stillwater, OK	W 13–0	25,000	
November 9	at Wyoming	Lewis Field; Stillwater, OK	W 39–6	14,000	
November 16	Kansas	Memorial Stadium; Lawrence, KS	L 7–13	12,000	
November 22	Hardin–Simmons	W. T. Barrett Stadium; Odessa, TX	W 32–7	3,500	
November 30	at No. 5 Oklahoma	Oklahoma Memorial Stadium; Norman, OK (Bedlam Series)	L 6–53	52,366	
^{†}Homecoming; Rankings from AP Poll released prior to the game; Source:

== After the season ==
The 1958 NFL draft took place on December 2, 1957, at The Warwick in Philadelphia. The following Oklahoma State player was selected during the draft.

Player	Position	Round	Pick	NFL team
Jon Evans	E	26th	308	Pittsburgh Steelers
