= 1957 Chattanooga Moccasins football team =

American college football season

1957 Chattanooga Moccasins football
- Conference: Independent
- Record: 4–5–1
- Head coach: Scrappy Moore (27th season)
- Captain: Red Clark
- Home stadium: Chamberlain Field

1957 Southern non-major college football independents records
	Conf.			Overall
Team	W	L	T	W		L		T
Louisville		–		9	–	1	–	0
Mississippi Southern		–		8	–	3	–	0
Sewanee		–		5	–	2	–	1
Tampa		–		6	–	3	–	0
Abilene Christian		–		5	–	3	–	1
Delaware		–		4	–	3	–	0
Memphis State		–		6	–	4	–	0
Chattanooga		–		4	–	5	–	1
Arkansas State		–		4	–	5	–	0
Howard (AL)		–		4	–	5	–	0
Trinity (TX)		–		3	–	5	–	0
Washington and Lee		–		0	–	8	–	0

The 1957 Chattanooga Moccasins football team was an American football team that represented the University of Chattanooga (now known as the University of Tennessee at Chattanooga) during the 1957 college football season. In their 27th year under head coach Scrappy Moore, the team compiled a 4–5–1 record.

== Schedule ==
Date	Opponent	Site	Result	Attendance	Source
September 20	Jacksonville State	Chamberlain Field; Chattanooga, TN	W 15–7		
September 27	Abilene Christian	Chamberlain Field; Chattanooga, TN	T 6–6		
October 5	at No. 7 Auburn	Cliff Hare Stadium; Auburn, AL	L 7–40	17,000	
October 12	at No. 19 Tennessee	Shields–Watkins Field; Knoxville, TN	L 13–28	21,500	
October 19	at Middle Tennessee	Horace Jones Field; Murfreesboro, TN	L 6–20		
October 25	Mississippi Southern	Chamberlain Field; Chattanooga, TN	L 0–20	6,500	
November 1	Tennessee Tech	Chamberlain Field; Chattanooga, TN	W 26–0	4,500	
November 9	at North Texas State	Fouts Field; Denton, TX	L 0–12	10,000	
November 16	at Furman	Sirrine Stadium; Greenville, SC	W 34–0	6,500	
November 28	Memphis State^{†}	Chamberlain Field; Chattanooga, TN	W 7–0	4,250	
^{†}Homecoming; Rankings from AP Poll released prior to the game
