= 1957 Arizona State Sun Devils football team =

American college football season

1957 Arizona State Sun Devils football

Border champion
- Conference: Border Conference

Ranking
- Coaches: No. 12
- AP: No. 12
- Record: 10–0 (4–0 Border)
- Head coach: Dan Devine (3rd season)
- MVP: John Hangartner
- Home stadium: Goodwin Stadium

1957 Border Conference football standings
	Conf.					Overall
Team	W		L		T	W		L		T
No. 12 Arizona State $	4	–	0	–	0	10	–	0	–	0
West Texas State	3	–	1	–	0	7	–	3	–	0
Texas Western	3	–	2	–	0	6	–	3	–	0
Hardin–Simmons	3	–	2	–	0	5	–	5	–	0
New Mexico A&M	0	–	4	–	0	3	–	7	–	0
Arizona	0	–	4	–	0	1	–	8	–	1
$ – Conference champion; Rankings from AP poll

The 1957 Arizona State Sun Devils football team was an American football team that represented Arizona State College in the Border Conference during the 1957 college football season. In their third and final season under head coach Dan Devine, the Sun Devils compiled a 10–0 record (4–0 in conference, first), were ranked twelfth in both final polls, and outscored their opponents 397 to 66. They were the first team in school history to finish the season ranked in any poll.

The team's statistical leaders included John Hangartner with 1,203 passing yards, Leon Burton with 1,126 rushing yards, and Clancy Osborne with 351 receiving yards. Burton led the country in both rushing yards and scoring (96 points). Teammate Bobby Mulgado ranked second in the country behind Burton with 93 points. Hangartner led all major-college players with a school record 14 passing touchdowns and also ranked fifth in the country with 1,203 passing yards in 1957. Hangartner was also selected as the most valuable player of both the 1957 and 1958 Arizona State Sun Devils football teams.

Cecil Coleman, Tom Fletcher, Frank Kush, and Al Onofrio were assistant coaches.

The team captains were halfback Bobby Mulgado and tight end Clarence Osborne. The undefeated Sun Devils went 6–0 at home and 4–0 on the road; home games were played on campus at Goodwin Stadium in Tempe, Arizona.

After the season in mid-December, Devine departed for the University of Missouri of the Big Eight Conference, succeeding Frank Broyles. A few days later, line coach Frank Kush was promoted and signed a one-year contract at a salary of $10,000.

== Schedule ==
Date	Opponent	Rank	Site	Result	Attendance	Source
September 21	at Wichita*		Veterans Field; Wichita, KS	W 28–0	14,001	
September 28	Idaho*		Goodwin Stadium; Tempe, AZ	W 19–7	16,000	
October 5	at San Jose State*		Spartan Stadium; San Jose, CA	W 44–6	10,000–10,600	
October 12	Hardin–Simmons		Goodwin Stadium; Tempe, AZ	W 35–26	17,000	
October 26	at San Diego State*		Aztec Bowl; San Diego, CA	W 66–0	8,500	
November 2	New Mexico A&M		Goodwin Stadium; Tempe, AZ	W 21–0	16,000	
November 9	at Texas Western		Kidd Field; El Paso, TX	W 43–7	11,300	
November 16	Montana State*^{†}		Goodwin Stadium; Tempe, AZ	W 53–13	17,000	
November 23	Pacific (CA)*	No. 17	Goodwin Stadium; Tempe, AZ	W 41–0	17,000–17,500	
November 30	Arizona	No. 11	Goodwin Stadium; Tempe, AZ (rivalry)	W 47–7	17,000	
*Non-conference game; ^{†}Homecoming; Rankings from Coaches' Poll released prior to the game

== Game summaries ==
In the season opener on September 21, 1957, Arizona defeated Wichita State, 28–0, on the road. The Sun Devils held Wichita State to only nine passing yards and 61 total yards.

In their home opener on September 28 at Goodwin Stadium, the Sun Devils defeated Idaho, 19–7.

On October 5, Arizona State recorded a 44-6 road win over San Jose State.

The Devils beat Hardin-Simmons, 35–26, in Tempe on October 12.

Following a bye week, Arizona State dominated San Diego State in a 66-0 road shutout victory on October 26. The Sun Devils scored nine rushing touchdowns and 10 touchdowns overall, tying single-game school records.

On November 2, the Sun Devils delivered a 21–0 home shutout win against New Mexico State.

Arizona State prevailed for a 43-7 road victory over Texas Western on November 9.

The Devils beat Montana State, 53–13, at Goodwin Stadium on November 16. This was the first meeting between the two football programs.

On November 23, Arizona State defeated Pacific, 41–0, in Tempe. It was the team's fourth shutout win of the season.

In the Arizona–Arizona State football rivalry game played on November 30 at Goodwin Stadium, the Sun Devils dominated Arizona, 47–7.

== Roster ==
Arizona State usual offensive lineup included wide receiver Bill Spanko, left tackle Bart Jankans, left guard Al Carr, center Dave Fonner, right guard Ken Kerr, right tackle Tom Ford, tight end Clarence Osborne, quarterback John Hangartner, halfback Bobby Mulgado (#27), fullback Joe Belland, and wingback Leon Burton. Allen Benedict, Joe Camut, Joe Drake, Charley Jones, Karl Kiefer, Fran Urban, John Vucichevich, and Paul Widmer were also on the roster.

== Individual and team statistics ==
Arizona State's individual statistical leaders included:

- Rushing: Leon Burton, 117 carries for 1,126 rushing yards, 9.6 yard average, and 12 rushing touchdowns;
- Passing: John Hangartner, 61 of 100 passing, 1,203 passing yards, 61.0% completion percentage, 14 passing touchdowns, and seven interceptions;
- Scoring: Leon Burton, 96 points on 16 touchdowns;
- Receiving: Clarence Osborne, 20 receptions for 351 yards and three touchdowns;
- Interceptions: Bobby Mulgado, six interceptions for 113 return yards;
- Punting: Bobby Mulgado, 24 punts for 878 yards and a 36.6 yard average;
- Kickoff returns: Joe Belland, six returns for 112 yards; and
- Punt returns: Bobby Mulgado, 14 returns for 267 yards and two touchdowns.

Arizona State team statistics included the following:

- Rushing yards: 292.2 yards per game on offense, 102.9 yards allowed per game on defense;
- Passing yards: 152.7 yards per game on offense, 124.0 yards allowed per game on defense;
- Total offense: 444.9 yards per game on offense, 216.6 yards allowed per game on defense;
- Scoring: 39.7 points per game on offense, 6.6 points allowed per game on defense;
- First downs: 182 first downs on offense, 138 first downs allowed on defense.
- Punts: 29 total punts for an average of 35.4 yards, while opponents recorded 66 total punts for an average of 32.8 yards.

The Sun Devils' defense set multiple school records during the 1957 season, including the lowest point total allowed in a season (66), fewest yards allowed per game (216.6), fewest points allowed per game (6.6), and fewest touchdowns allowed in a season (10). The team also recorded the fewest punts in a season (29) and fewest punt yards in a season (1,028 Yds). Quarterback John Hangartner set a single-season school record by averaging 12.03 passing yards per attempt.

== Awards and honors ==
Four Arizona State players received first-team honors on the 1957 All-Border Conference football team: wingback Leon Burton, center Dave Fonner, right guard Ken Kerr, and wide receiver Bill Spanko. Burton also played in the 1957 East–West Shrine Game.

Team awards were presented to halfback Bobby Mulgado (Sun Angel Award) and center Dave Fonner (Cecil Abonor Captains Award).
