= 1957 Louisville Cardinals football team =

American college football season

1957 Louisville Cardinals football

Sun Bowl champion

Sun Bowl, W 34–20 vs. Drake
- Conference: Independent
- Record: 9–1
- Head coach: Frank Camp (12th season)
- Home stadium: Fairgrounds Stadium

1957 Southern non-major college football independents records
	Conf.			Overall
Team	W	L	T	W		L		T
Louisville		–		9	–	1	–	0
Mississippi Southern		–		8	–	3	–	0
Sewanee		–		5	–	2	–	1
Tampa		–		6	–	3	–	0
Abilene Christian		–		5	–	3	–	1
Delaware		–		4	–	3	–	0
Memphis State		–		6	–	4	–	0
Chattanooga		–		4	–	5	–	1
Arkansas State		–		4	–	5	–	0
Howard (AL)		–		4	–	5	–	0
Trinity (TX)		–		3	–	5	–	0
Washington and Lee		–		0	–	8	–	0

The 1957 Louisville Cardinals football team was an American football team that represented the University of Louisville as an independent during the 1957 college football season. In its 12th season under head coach Frank Camp, the team compiled a 9–1 record and defeated Drake in the Sun Bowl. The team played its home games at Fairgrounds Stadium in Louisville, Kentucky.

Leonard "Bones" Lyles led the nation in scoring. He also set Louisville records for points in a season and in a career, yards gained in a season, and most rushing yards in a career.

== Schedule ==
Date	Opponent	Site	Result	Attendance	Source
September 21	at Evansville	Evansville, IN	W 33–7	3,350	
September 27	at Eastern Kentucky	Richmond, KY	W 40–14		
October 5	Toledo	Fairgrounds Stadium; Louisville, KY	W 48–20	6,500	
October 12	at Murray State	Murray, KY	W 35–0	4,000	
October 19	Dayton	Fairgrounds Stadium; Louisville, KY	W 33–19	12,250	
October 26	Central Michigan	Fairgrounds Stadium; Louisville, KY	W 40–0	5,500	
November 9	at Kent State	Memorial Stadium; Kent, OH	L 7–13	500	
November 16	Ohio^{†}	Fairgrounds Stadium; Louisville, KY	W 40–7	5,500	
November 22	Morehead State	Fairgrounds Stadium; Louisville, KY	W 40–6	3,000	
January 1, 1958	Drake	Kidd Field; El Paso, TX (Sun Bowl)	W 34–20	9,000	
^{†}Homecoming

== Players selected in the 1958 NFL draft ==
Player	Position	Round	Pick	NFL club
Lenny Lyles	Back	1	11	Baltimore Colts
Mario Cheppo	End	18	207	Chicago Cardinals
