= 1957 Ohio Bobcats football team =

American college football season

1957 Ohio Bobcats football
- Conference: Mid-American Conference
- Record: 2–6–1 (1–4–1 MAC)
- Head coach: Carroll Widdoes (9th season)
- Home stadium: Peden Stadium

1957 Mid-American Conference football standings
	Conf.					Overall
Team	W		L		T	W		L		T
Miami (OH) $	5	–	0	–	0	6	–	3	–	0
Bowling Green	3	–	1	–	2	6	–	1	–	2
Marshall	4	–	2	–	0	6	–	3	–	0
Toledo	3	–	2	–	0	5	–	4	–	0
Western Michigan	1	–	4	–	1	4	–	4	–	1
Ohio	1	–	4	–	1	2	–	6	–	1
Kent State	1	–	5	–	0	3	–	6	–	0
$ – Conference champion

The 1957 Ohio Bobcats football team was an American football team that represented Ohio University in the Mid-American Conference (MAC) during the 1957 college football season. In their ninth and final season under head coach Carroll Widdoes, the Bobcats compiled a 2–6–1 record (1–4–1 against MAC opponents), finished in a tie for fifth place in the MAC, and were outscored by all opponents by a combined total of 156 to 134. They played their home games in Peden Stadium in Athens, Ohio.

== Schedule ==
Date	Opponent	Site	Result	Attendance	Source
September 21	Indiana (PA)*	Peden Stadium; Athens, OH	W 50–0		
September 28	at Toledo	Glass Bowl; Toledo, OH	L 6–14		
October 5	Kent State	Peden Stadium; Athens, OH	L 9–14		
October 12	at Harvard*	Harvard Stadium; Boston, MA	L 7–14	10,000	
October 19	at Miami (OH)	Miami Field; Oxford, OH (rivalry)	L 0–26		
October 26	at Marshall	Fairfield Stadium; Huntington, WV (rivalry)	L 28–34		
November 2	Western Michigan	Peden Stadium; Athens, OH	W 20–7		
November 9	Bowling Green	Peden Stadium; Athens, OH	T 7–7		
November 16	at Louisville*	Fairgrounds Stadium; Louisville, KY	L 7–40	5,500	
*Non-conference game
