= 1957 Miami Redskins football team =

American college football season

1957 Miami Redskins football

MAC champion
- Conference: Mid-American Conference
- Record: 6–3 (5–0 MAC)
- Head coach: John Pont (2nd season)
- Captain: Mack Yoho
- Home stadium: Miami Field

1957 Mid-American Conference football standings
| | Conf. | | | | | Overall |
| Team | W | | L | | T | W | | L | | T |
|---|---|---|---|---|---|---|---|---|---|---|
| Miami (OH) $ | 5 | – | 0 | – | 0 | 6 | – | 3 | – | 0 |
| Bowling Green | 3 | – | 1 | – | 2 | 6 | – | 1 | – | 2 |
| Marshall | 4 | – | 2 | – | 0 | 6 | – | 3 | – | 0 |
| Toledo | 3 | – | 2 | – | 0 | 5 | – | 4 | – | 0 |
| Western Michigan | 1 | – | 4 | – | 1 | 4 | – | 4 | – | 1 |
| Ohio | 1 | – | 4 | – | 1 | 2 | – | 6 | – | 1 |
| Kent State | 1 | – | 5 | – | 0 | 3 | – | 6 | – | 0 |
$ – Conference champion

The 1957 Miami Redskins football team was an American football team that represented Miami University in the Mid-American Conference (MAC) during the 1957 college football season. In its second season under head coach John Pont, Miami compiled a 6–3 record (5–0 against MAC opponents), won the MAC championship, and outscored all opponents by a combined total of 163 to 137.

Mack Yoho was the team captain. The team's statistical leaders included Dave Thelen with 755 rushing yards, Ernie Jarvis with 197 passing yards and Harold Williams with 118 receiving yards.

== Schedule ==
| Date | Opponent | Site | Result | Attendance | Source |
|---|---|---|---|---|---|
| September 28 | at Western Michigan | Waldo Stadium; Kalamazoo, MI | W 20–0 | | |
| October 5 | Xavier* | Miami Field; Oxford, OH | L 19–39 | | |
| October 12 | at Kent State | Memorial Stadium; Kent, OH | W 27–14 | | |
| October 19 | Ohio | Miami Field; Oxford, OH (Battle of the Bricks) | W 26–0 | | |
| October 26 | at Purdue* | Ross–Ade Stadium; West Lafayette, IN | L 6–37 | 35,655 | |
| November 2 | at Bowling Green | University Stadium; Bowling Green, OH | W 13–7 | | |
| November 9 | Marshall | Miami Field; Oxford, OH | W 25–13 | | |
| November 16 | at Dayton* | Baujan Field; Dayton, OH | L 7–13 | 7,000 | |
| November 28 | at Cincinnati* | Nippert Stadium; Cincinnati, OH (Victory Bell) | W 20–14 | | |
*Non-conference game
