= 1957 Eastern Illinois Panthers football team =

American college football season

1957 Eastern Illinois Panthers football
- Conference: Interstate Intercollegiate Athletic Conference
- Record: 0–8 (0–6 IIAC)
- Head coach: Ralph Kohl (1st season)
- Home stadium: Lincoln Field

1957 Interstate Intercollegiate Athletic Conference football standings
	Conf.					Overall
Team	W		L		T	W		L		T
Eastern Michigan $	6	–	0	–	0	6	–	3	–	0
Western Illinois	4	–	2	–	0	5	–	4	–	0
Central Michigan	4	–	2	–	0	4	–	6	–	0
Illinois State Normal	3	–	3	–	0	5	–	3	–	0
Southern Illinois	3	–	3	–	0	5	–	4	–	0
Northern Illinois	1	–	5	–	0	2	–	7	–	0
Eastern Illinois	0	–	6	–	0	0	–	8	–	0
$ – Conference champion

The 1957 Eastern Illinois Panthers football team represented Eastern Illinois University as a member of the Interstate Intercollegiate Athletic Conference (IIAC) during the 1957 college football season. The team was led by first-year head coach Ralph Kohl and played their home games at Lincoln Field in Charleston, Illinois. The Panthers lost every game they played, finishing the season with a 0–8 record overall and a 0–6 record in conference play.

== Schedule ==
Date	Opponent	Site	Result	Source
September 21	at Indiana State*	Memorial Stadium; Terre Haute, IN	L 0–14	
September 28	Southeast Missouri State*	Lincoln Field; Charleston, IL	L 0–41	
October 5	Northern Illinois	Lincoln Field; Charleston, IL	L 20–27	
October 12	at Southern Illinois	McAndrew Stadium; Carbondale, IL	L 6–27	
October 19	Eastern Michigan	Lincoln Field; Charleston, IL	L 0–39	
October 26	Western Illinois	Lincoln Field; Charleston, IL	L 13–21	
November 2	at Central Michigan	Alumni Field; Mount Pleasant, MI	L 6–61	
November 9	at Illinois State Normal	McCormick Field; Normal, IL (rivalry)	L 7–39	
*Non-conference game
