= 1957 Marquette Warriors football team =

American college football season

1957 Marquette Warriors football
- Conference: Independent
- Record: 0–10
- Head coach: John F. Druze (2nd season)
- Home stadium: Marquette Stadium, Milwaukee County Stadium

1957 Midwestern major college football independents records
	Conf.			Overall
Team	W	L	T	W		L		T
No. 10 Notre Dame		–		7	–	3	–	0
Drake		–		7	–	2	–	0
Detroit		–		6	–	3	–	0
Dayton		–		6	–	3	–	1
Xavier		–		5	–	5	–	0
Marquette		–		0	–	10	–	0
Rankings from AP poll

The 1957 Marquette Warriors football team was an American football team that represented Marquette University as an independent during the 1957 college football season. In its second season under head coach John F. Druze, the team compiled a 0–10 record and was outscored by a total of 237 to 68. The 1957 season was part of a 20-game losing streak that began in November 1955 and continued through the end of the 1957 season.

The team played its home games at Marquette Stadium (one game) and Milwaukee County Stadium (four games) in Milwaukee. The move to County Stadium, combined with a losing record, saw attendance drop to 5,953 and 4,719 for the final two home games against Pacific and Penn State.

== Schedule ==
Date	Opponent	Site	Result	Attendance	Source
September 21	at Detroit	University of Detroit Stadium; Detroit, MI	L 0–14	12,611	
September 28	at Wisconsin	Camp Randall Stadium; Madison, WI	L 6–60	47,267–52,700	
October 5	Tulane	Marquette Stadium; Milwaukee, WI	L 6–20	12,500	
October 12	Holy Cross	Milwaukee County Stadium; Milwaukee, WI	L 7–26	9,420	
October 19	at Cincinnati	Nippert Stadium; Cincinnati, OH	L 0–14	12,000–12,500	
October 26	TCU	Milwaukee County Stadium; Milwaukee, WI	L 7–26	10,925–10,945	
November 2	Pacific (CA)	Milwaukee County Stadium; Milwaukee, WI	L 7–21	5,953	
November 9	Penn State	Milwaukee County Stadium; Milwaukee, WI	L 7–20	4,700–4,719	
November 16	at Boston College	Alumni Stadium; Chestnut Hill, MA	L 14–19	13,000	
November 23	at Arizona	Arizona Stadium; Tucson, AZ	L 14–17	14,000	
