= 1957 Detroit Titans football team =

American college football season

1957 Detroit Titans football
- Conference: Independent
- Record: 6–3
- Head coach: Wally Fromhart (4th season)
- Home stadium: University of Detroit Stadium

1957 Midwestern major college football independents records
	Conf.			Overall
Team	W	L	T	W		L		T
No. 10 Notre Dame		–		7	–	3	–	0
Drake		–		7	–	2	–	0
Detroit		–		6	–	3	–	0
Dayton		–		6	–	3	–	1
Xavier		–		5	–	5	–	0
Marquette		–		0	–	10	–	0
Rankings from AP poll

The 1957 Detroit Titans football team represented the University of Detroit as an independent during the 1957 college football season. Detroit outscored its opponents by a combined total of 179 to 98 and finished with a 6–3 record in its fourth year under head coach Wally Fromhart.

The team's statistical leaders included Lou Faoro with 545 passing yards, Billy Russell with 431 rushing yards, and Albert Korpak with 266 receiving yards and 48 points scored.

== Schedule ==
Date	Opponent	Site	Result	Attendance	Source
September 21	Marquette	University of Detroit Stadium; Detroit, MI	W 14–0	12,611	
October 5	at Air Force	DU Stadium; Denver, CO	L 12–19	6,629	
October 12	at Wichita	Veterans Stadium; Wichita, KS	W 28–0	9,200	
October 19	Xavier	University of Detroit Stadium; Detroit, MI	W 30–20	14,891	
October 26	Boston College	University of Detroit Stadium; Detroit, MI	L 16–20	8,563	
November 2	at Cincinnati	Nippert Stadium; Cincinnati, CO	W 20–12	17,000	
November 9	Villanova	University of Detroit Stadium; Detroit, MI	W 16–7	7,696	
November 16	Quantico Marines	University of Detroit Stadium; Detroit, MI	W 33–0	11,411	
November 23	at Dayton	Baujan Field; Dayton, OH	L 10–20	6,395	
