= Casto Ramsey =

American football coach (1916–2007)

Biographical details
- Born: August 6, 1920
- Died: December 20, 2008 (aged 88); Abingdon, Virginia, U.S.

Playing career

Football
- 1940–1941: King
- Position: Quarterback

Coaching career (HC unless noted)

Football
- 1946: Cambridge HS (OH) (backfield)
- 1947: Dundee HS (IL) (backfield)
- 1948–1951: Tazewell HS (VA)
- 1952: Virginia HS (VA)
- 1953–1956: Emory and Henry
- 1957–1959: Houston (offensive backfield)
- 1960–1968: Emory and Henry
- 1969: VPI (offensive backfield)
- 1970–1971: Abingdon HS (VA)
- 1972–1973: Virginia (backfield)
- 1974–1975: Sullivan East HS (TN)

Basketball
- 1953–1956: Emory and Henry

Administrative career (AD unless noted)
- 1952–1953: Virginia HS (VA)

Head coaching record
- Overall: 81–40–7 (college football); 39–30 (college basketball)

Accomplishments and honors

Championships
- Football; 3 Smoky Mountain (1953, 1956, 1962); 2 Virginia Little Seven/Eight (1954, 1956)

Charles Casto Ramsey (August 6, 1920 – December 20, 2008) was an American football and basketball coach. He served two stints as the head football coach at Emory and Henry College in Emory, Virginia, from 1953 to 1956, and 1960 to 1968, compiling a record of 81–40–7. Ramsey was also the head basketball coach at Emory and Henry from 1953 to 1956, tallying a mark of 39–30. He left Emory and Henry in 1957 to become the offensive backfield coach at the University of Houston under Hal Lahar.

A native of Cardington, Ohio, Ramsey attended high school in Galion, Ohio. He attended Ohio University and Michigan State University before playing college football at King College—now known as King University—in Bristol, Tennessee. During World War II, Ramsey served as a physical instructor at King College for the Army Cadet Corps and later aboard the USS Antietam as director of athletics. Ramsey began his football coaching career after the war as backfield coach at Cambridge High School in Cambridge, Ohio and the following year in the same capacity in Dundee, Illinois. In 1948, he was appointed he football coach at Tazewell High School in Tazewell, Virginia, succeeding Conley Snidow, who became head football and basketball coach at Emory and Henry.

Ramsey died on December 20, 2008, in Abingdon, Virginia.

== Head coaching record ==
=== College football ===
Year	Team	Overall	Conference	Standing	Bowl/playoffs
Emory and Henry Wasps (Smoky Mountain Conference / Virginia Little Six/Seven/Eight Conference) (1953–1956)
1953	Emory and Henry	6–5	/ 1–1	1st / 2nd	L Burley
1954	Emory and Henry	4–3–3	/ 2–0	T–1st / 1st	
1955	Emory and Henry	6–3–1	1–0 / 1–1	1st / 3rd	
1956	Emory and Henry	9–1	1–0 / 2–0	1st / 1st	
Emory and Henry Wasps (Smoky Mountain Conference / Virginia Little Six/Seven/Eight Conference) (1960–1965)
1960	Emory and Henry	7–2–1	/ 1–0	/ 2nd	
1961	Emory and Henry	4–4	/ 1–0	/ NA	
1962	Emory and Henry	8–0–1	/ 1–0	1st / NA	
1963	Emory and Henry	8–2–1	/ 0–0	/ 3rd	
1964	Emory and Henry	2–8	/ 1–1	/ T–3rd	
1965	Emory and Henry	3–6	/ 1–0	/ 2nd	
Emory and Henry Wasps (NCAA College Division independent) (1966–1968)
1966	Emory and Henry	8–2			
1967	Emory and Henry	7–3			
1968	Emory and Henry	9–1			
Emory and Henry:		81–40–7			
Total:		81–40–7			
National championship Conference title Conference division title or championship game berth
