= 1957 Pacific Tigers football team =

American college football season

1957 Pacific Tigers football
- Conference: Independent
- Record: 5–3–2
- Head coach: Jack Myers (5th season)
- Home stadium: Pacific Memorial Stadium

1957 Western major college football independents records
	Conf.			Overall
Team	W	L	T	W		L		T
Pacific (CA)		–		5	–	3	–	2
Air Force		–		3	–	6	–	1
San Jose State		–		3	–	7	–	0

The 1957 Pacific Tigers football team represented the College of the Pacific (COP)—now known as the University of the Pacific—as an independent during the 1957 college football season. Led by fifth-year head coach Jack Myers, the Tigers compiled a record of 5–3–2 and outscored opponents 145 to 127. The team played home games at Pacific Memorial Stadium in Stockton, California.

== Schedule ==
Date	Opponent	Site	Result	Attendance	Source
September 21	at San Diego State	Aztec Bowl; San Diego, CA	W 32–6	9,500	
September 28	Fresno State	Pacific Memorial Stadium; Stockton, CA	W 34–12	20,500	
October 5	Tulsa	Pacific Memorial Stadium; Stockton, CA	W 21–13	16,000	
October 12	Kansas State	Pacific Memorial Stadium; Stockton, CA	T 7–7	11,000	
October 19	Idaho^{†}	Pacific Memorial Stadium; Stockton, CA	T 7–7	17,000	
October 26	at Cincinnati	Nippert Stadium; Cincinnati, OH	L 2–7	12,000	
November 2	at Marquette	Milwaukee County Stadium; Milwaukee, WI	W 21–7	5,953	
November 9	at San Jose State	Spartan Stadium; San Jose, CA (Victory Bell)	W 21–6	14,500	
November 16	UCLA	Pacific Memorial Stadium; Stockton, CA	L 0–21	23,000	
November 23	at Arizona State	Goodwin Stadium; Tempe, AZ	L 0–41	17,000–17,500	
^{†}Homecoming; Source:

== Team players in the NFL ==
The following College of the Pacific players were selected in the 1958 NFL draft.

Player	Position	Round	Overall	NFL team
Bill Striegel	Guard – Tackle – Linebacker	8	88	Philadelphia Eagles
