= Ralph Kohl =

American football player, coach, and scout (1923–1997)

Biographical details
- Born: August 21, 1923; Shaker Heights, Ohio, U.S.
- Died: June 11, 1997 (aged 73); Saugatuck, Michigan, U.S.

Playing career
- 1942: Kentucky
- 1947–1948: Michigan
- Position: Tackle

Coaching career (HC unless noted)
- 1951: Joliet Central HS (IL) (line)
- 1952–1954: Eastern Michigan (line)
- 1955–1956: Franklin (IN)
- 1957–1964: Eastern Illinois

Administrative career (AD unless noted)
- 1965–1972: BLESTO NFL (scout)
- 1973–1993: Minnesota Vikings (head scout)

Head coaching record
- Overall: 28–56–2

Accomplishments and honors

Championships
- National (1948)

Ralph Anson Kohl (August 21, 1923 – June 11, 1997) was an American football player, coach and scout. He played at the tackle position on the University of Michigan's undefeated 1947 and 1948 football teams. He signed to play with the Baltimore Colts, but a knee injury prevented him from playing in the NFL. He was an assistant football coach at Eastern Michigan University (1952–1954) and a head coach at Franklin College (1955–1956) and Eastern Illinois University (1957–1964). From 1964 until his retirement in 1993, Kohl worked as a professional football scout. He was considered the top scout in the BLESTO NFL scouting combine in the 1960s and 1970s and served as the head scout for the Minnesota Vikings for two decades.

== Early years ==
Kohl was born in Shaker Heights, Ohio and grew up in University Heights. He attended high school in Cleveland Heights and prep school at the Kentucky Military Institute. He briefly enrolled at both the University of Kentucky and Western Teachers College. He played for the Kentucky Wildcats football team in 1942. He enlisted in the U.S. Army Air Corps and served in Italy and Africa during World War II.

== University of Michigan ==
After being released from the military, Kohl enrolled at the University of Michigan and played at the right tackle position for head coach Fritz Crisler on the undefeated 1947 Michigan Wolverines football team that has been selected b the ESPN Big Ten College Football Encyclopedia as the best team in the history of Michigan football. He also played right tackle for Bennie Oosterbaan's undefeated 1948 Michigan Wolverines football team. Kohl played on Crisler's offensive squad in 1947, and he was switched to a defensive tackle in 1948. His "alert recovery of a fumble" in the third quarter of the 1948 Ohio State game was credited with helping Michigan "cling to a precarious seven to three lead." The 1949 Michiganensian (the University of Michigan yearbook) said, "Ralph Kohl, gigantic tackle, was the power man in the offensive line. Transferring from the defensive spot which he held down in 1947, the big Cleveland boy was a vital cog in the front line of the Michigan attack."

During Kohl's two years playing for the Wolverines, the team won 19 games and lost none, outscoring opponents by a combined score of 646 to 97 and won an undisputed national championship in 1948 and a contested national championship in 1947. Kohl was selected to participate in two of the post-season college all-star games, both the East–West Shrine Game played on New Year's Day 1949, and the 1949 Chicago Tribune Charities, Inc. All-Star Game played in the summer of 1949.

== Football coach ==
In May 1949, after graduating from Michigan, Kohl signed with the Baltimore Colts, but a knee injury prevented him from playing in the NFL. Kohl began a career as the football coach at Belding, Michigan High School in 1950.. He then was the line coach for the Joliet Steelemen in the Greater Chicago League. From 1952 to 1954, he served as an assistant coach, with responsibility for the linemen, at Eastern Michigan University. In April 1955, he became the head football coach at Franklin College in Franklin, Indiana. After two years as the head coach of the Franklin Grizzlies, Kohl was hired by Eastern Illinois University in Charleston, Illinois, as its head football coach in June 1957. Kohl served as the head football coach for the Eastern Illinois Panthers from 1957 through 1964, compiling a record of 17–49–2.

== Football scout ==
After the 1964 season, Kohl resigned his position as the head coach at Eastern Illinois to accept a job as a scout for BLESTO, an NFL scouting combine that was an acronym for the Bears, Lions, Eagles and Steelers Talent Organization. The four teams, later joined by the Minnesota Vikings, Miami Dolphins and Dallas Cowboys, combined their scouting resources under the BLESTO banner. Kohl began as a scout for talent at Big Eight and then Big Ten universities. He was considered BLESTO's best scout and became the combine's Eastern supervisor scout in 1968. In the 1970s, Kohl became the head scout for the Vikings, a position he held for two decades until his retirement in 1993. In 1988, the Minneapolis Star Tribune praised Kohl for his talent as a scout: "Ralph Kohl, the Vikings' chief scout, is a respected judge of football flesh. He has been rating players for nearly a quarter of a century and once was the top scout for the Blesto combine. Clearly the man he knows his stuff ..." In September 1984, Kohl was one of the first scouts to tout Randall Cunningham, then a little-known quarterback at UNLV. In 1981, Kohl recommended that the Vikings draft Villanova defensive lineman Howie Long. Vikings general manager Mike Lynn recalled his response: "Howie Long? We said, 'What are you talking about, Ralph? You've got to be out of your mind,'" Long was drafted in the second round by the Oakland Raiders and went on to a career that resulted in his being inducted into the Pro Football Hall of Fame. Lynn later noted, "Ninety to 95 percent of the players Ralph says will make the team will make it. It's an amazing statistic."

Kohl developed a reputation as one of the best scouts in the NFL and said that the key to success was forming one's own opinions based on the facts and not buying into the conventional wisdom about players. He noted, "It's a matter of a guy being stereotyped. Scouts are old coaches, and coaches are parrots. They say the same thing, and even if it's a lie, if it's told often enough, people believe it." He was also dubious about the modern scouts' reliance on "all the measuring" of height, weight, speed, strength and agility. In Kohl's view, it was about something more basic, "The bottom line is, can the guy play football?"

== Family and later years ==
Kohl and his wife, Dorothy Kohl, had a daughter, Jackie, who was born in approximately 1954. He moved with his wife and daughter to Holland, Michigan in 1969. They later moved to nearby Saugatuck, Michigan, and for 23 years from the 1970s until 1996, Kohl and his wife spent the winters at their second home in Pompano Beach, Florida.

Kohl died in June 1997 at Holland County Hospital in Saugatuck, Michigan. Kohl and his wife had been married for 45 years at the time of his death.

== Head coaching record ==
Year	Team	Overall	Conference	Standing	Bowl/playoffs
Franklin Grizzlies (Hoosier Conference) (1955–1956)
1955	Franklin	6–3	4–2	T–2nd	
1956	Franklin	5–4	3–3	4th	
Franklin:		11–7	7–5		
Eastern Illinois Panthers (Interstate Intercollegiate Athletic Conference) (1957–1964)
1957	Eastern Illinois	0–8	0–6	7th	
1958	Eastern Illinois	2–6	1–5	7th	
1959	Eastern Illinois	3–5–1	1–4–1	5th	
1960	Eastern Illinois	2–7	1–5	T–6th	
1961	Eastern Illinois	4–3–1	3–2–1	T–4th	
1962	Eastern Illinois	1–7	0–4	5th	
1963	Eastern Illinois	2–7	1–3	4th	
1964	Eastern Illinois	3–6	1–3	T–4th	
Eastern Illinois:		17–49–2	8–32–2		
Total:		28–56–2			
