= Ralph Hatley =

American football player and coach (1913–2001)

Biographical details
- Born: April 3, 1913; Trenton, Tennessee, U.S.
- Died: October 14, 2001 (aged 88); Memphis, Tennessee, U.S.

Playing career
- 1933–1935: Tennessee
- Positions: Tackle, guard

Coaching career (HC unless noted)
- 1936: Tennessee–Martin (line)
- 1937–1940: Dyersburg HS (TN)
- 1941–1946: Christian Brothers HS (TN)
- 1947–1957: Memphis State

Head coaching record
- Overall: 60–43–5 (college)
- Bowls: 1–0

Ralph Lee Hatley Sr. (April 3, 1913 – October 14, 2001) was an American football coach and player. He served as the head football coach at Memphis State University from 1947 to 1957, compiling a record of 60–43–5 in 11 seasons. As head coach, he led the Tigers to their first bowl appearance, a 32–12 victory in the 1956 Burley Bowl over East Tennessee State. A standout lineman under Robert Neyland at Tennessee from 1933 to 1935, Hatley also served as head coach at two Tennessee high schools, Dyersburg High School in Dyersburg, Tennessee and Christian Brothers High School in Memphis, Tennessee as well as an assistant coach at the University of Tennessee at Martin.

== Early life ==
Hatley was born in Trenton, Tennessee on April 3, 1913, and raised in Jackson, Tennessee. He starred as a player at Jackson High School before heading to Knoxville, Tennessee to play for legendary coach Robert Neyland. With the Volunteers, Hatley was an offensive lineman and a captain for the 1934 Tennessee Volunteers football team and also was selected to the all-SEC team that year. He was a teammate of Cecil Humphreys, who would later serve as athletics director at Memphis State who hired Hatley as head football coach.

== Coaching career ==
After graduating from the University of Tennessee, Hatley embarked on a coaching career, first at the University of Tennessee at Martin in 1936. From there, he returned to west Tennessee and took over as head coach at Dyersburg High School for four years before moving to Memphis to take the head coaching position at Christian Brothers High School. After Memphis State University did not field a football team from 1943 to 1946 due to the events surrounding World War II, athletics director Cecil Humphreys turned to Hatley to lead the football program. One of his first moves as head coach was to name Billy Murphy as an assistant coach. Hatley's first Tigers team in 1947 had 38 freshmen, but still managed to earn a 6–2–1 record. In 1949, Hatley's Tigers outscored their opponents 385-87 throughout the season and led the nation in total points scored for the season. In 1949, Memphis State finished 9–2 and set a then-school record with 21,000 in attendance to watch the team play Ole Miss. Hatley hired Ken Donahue as line coach in 1951. During Hatley's tenure as head coach, Memphis State graduated 98% of its football players. In 1956, Hatley's Tigers made their first bowl appearance in school history in the final playing of the Burley Bowl, a 32–12 victory over East Tennessee. Hatley retired as head coach after the 1957 season with a 60–43–5 record. He retired as the school's winningest head coach and remained so until he was surpassed by his successor in 1967.

== After coaching ==
After retiring from coaching, Hatley was named chair of Memphis State's health, recreation and fitness department. He served as president of the Tennessee College Physical Education Association and was honored for his service with awards from the College of Physical Education of the United States and State of Tennessee Health and Physical Education Association. Hatley died on October 14, 2001, at age 88.

== Personal life ==
Hatley was married to the former Ruth Wahli. Hatley's son, Ralph Lee Hatley, Jr., starred in football at Memphis State in the early 1970s before becoming a well-known performing arts actor in the Memphis area.

== Head coaching record ==
=== College ===
Year	Team	Overall	Conference	Standing	Bowl/playoffs
Memphis State Tigers (Independent) (1947–1957)
1947	Memphis State	6–2–1			
1948	Memphis State	6–5			
1949	Memphis State	9–2			
1950	Memphis State	9–2			
1951	Memphis State	5–3			
1952	Memphis State	2–7			
1953	Memphis State	6–4			
1954	Memphis State	3–4–3			
1955	Memphis State	2–7			
1956	Memphis State	5–4–1			W Burley
1957	Memphis State	6–4			
Memphis State:		60–43–5			
Total:		60–43–5			
