= 1957 Marshall Thundering Herd football team =

American college football season

1957 Marshall Thundering Herd football
- Conference: Mid-American Conference
- Record: 6–3 (4–2 MAC)
- Head coach: Herb Royer (5th season)
- Captains: Jim Simpson; Herb Hess
- Home stadium: Fairfield Stadium

1957 Mid-American Conference football standings
	Conf.					Overall
Team	W		L		T	W		L		T
Miami (OH) $	5	–	0	–	0	6	–	3	–	0
Bowling Green	3	–	1	–	2	6	–	1	–	2
Marshall	4	–	2	–	0	6	–	3	–	0
Toledo	3	–	2	–	0	5	–	4	–	0
Western Michigan	1	–	4	–	1	4	–	4	–	1
Ohio	1	–	4	–	1	2	–	6	–	1
Kent State	1	–	5	–	0	3	–	6	–	0
$ – Conference champion

The 1957 Marshall Thundering Herd football team was an American football team that represented Marshall University in the Mid-American Conference (MAC) during the 1957 college football season. In its fifth season under head coach Herb Royer, the team compiled a 6–3 record (4–2 against conference opponents), finished in third place out of seven teams in the MAC, and outscored opponents by a total of 120 to 112. Jim Simpson and Herb Hess were the team captains. The team played its home games at Fairfield Stadium in Huntington, West Virginia.

== Schedule ==
Date	Opponent	Site	Result	Source
September 21	West Virginia State*	Fairfield Stadium; Huntington, WV	W 12–7	
September 28	Morehead State*	Fairfield Stadium; Huntington, WV	W 21–0	
October 5	at Western Michigan	Waldo Stadium; Kalamazoo, MI	W 12–7	
October 12	at Toledo	Glass Bowl; Toledo, OH	W 14–7	
October 19	Kent State	Fairfield Stadium; Huntington, WV	W 7–6	
October 26	Ohio^{†}	Fairfield Stadium; Huntington, WV (rivalry)	W 34–28	
November 2	at Xavier*	Xavier Stadium; Cincinnati, OH	L 0–18	
November 9	at Miami (OH)	Miami Field; Oxford, OH	L 13–25	
November 16	Bowling Green	Fairfield Stadium; Huntington, WV	L 7–14	
*Non-conference game; ^{†}Homecoming
