= 1957 Kent State Golden Flashes football team =

American college football season

1957 Kent State Golden Flashes football
- Conference: Mid-American Conference
- Record: 3–6 (1–5 MAC)
- Head coach: Trevor J. Rees (12th season)
- Home stadium: Memorial Stadium

1957 Mid-American Conference football standings
	Conf.					Overall
Team	W		L		T	W		L		T
Miami (OH) $	5	–	0	–	0	6	–	3	–	0
Bowling Green	3	–	1	–	2	6	–	1	–	2
Marshall	4	–	2	–	0	6	–	3	–	0
Toledo	3	–	2	–	0	5	–	4	–	0
Western Michigan	1	–	4	–	1	4	–	4	–	1
Ohio	1	–	4	–	1	2	–	6	–	1
Kent State	1	–	5	–	0	3	–	6	–	0
$ – Conference champion

The 1957 Kent State Golden Flashes football team was an American football team that represented Kent State University in the Mid-American Conference (MAC) during the 1957 college football season. In their 12th season under head coach Trevor J. Rees, the Golden Flashes compiled a 3–6 record (1–5 against MAC opponents), finished in seventh place in the MAC, and were outscored by all opponents by a combined total of 138 to 114.

The team's statistical leaders included Ron Fowler with 508 rushing yards, Ken Horton with 304 passing yards, and Dick Mihalus with 100 receiving yards.

== Schedule ==
Date	Opponent	Site	Result	Source
September 21	at Xavier*	Xavier Stadium; Cincinnati, OH	L 7–13	
September 27	Baldwin–Wallace*	Memorial Stadium; Kent, OH	W 26–13	
October 5	at Ohio	Peden Stadium; Athens, OH	W 14–9	
October 12	Miami (OH)	Memorial Stadium; Kent, OH	L 14–27	
October 19	at Marshall	Fairfield Stadium; Huntington, WV	L 6–7	
October 26	Bowling Green	Memorial Stadium; Kent, OH (rivalry)	L 7–13	
November 2	at Toledo	Glass Bowl; Toledo, OH	L 7–21	
November 9	Louisville*	Memorial Stadium; Kent, OH	W 13–7	
November 16	at Western Michigan	Waldo Stadium; Kalamazoo, MI	L 20–28	
*Non-conference game

== Personnel ==
=== Roster ===
- LB Lou Holtz

=== Coaching staff ===
- Assistant Rick Forzano
