= 1957 Wichita Shockers football team =

American college football season

1957 Wichita Shockers football
- Conference: Missouri Valley Conference
- Record: 1–9 (0–3 MVC)
- Head coach: Woody Woodard (1st season)
- Home stadium: Veterans Field

1957 Missouri Valley Conference football standings
	Conf.					Overall
Team	W		L		T	W		L		T
Houston $	3	–	0	–	0	5	–	4	–	1
North Texas State	1	–	0	–	0	5	–	5	–	0
Tulsa	2	–	2	–	0	4	–	6	–	0
Cincinnati	1	–	2	–	0	5	–	4	–	1
Wichita	0	–	3	–	0	1	–	9	–	0
$ – Conference champion

The 1957 Wichita Shockers football team, sometimes known as the Wheatshockers, was an American football team that represented Wichita University (now known as Wichita State University) as a member of the Missouri Valley Conference during the 1957 college football season. In its first season under head coach Woody Woodard, the team compiled a 1–9 record (0–3 against conference opponents), finished in fifth place out of five teams in the MVC, and was outscored by a total of 250 to 66. The team played its home games at Veterans Field, now known as Cessna Stadium.

== Schedule ==
Date	Opponent	Site	Result	Attendance	Source
September 21	Arizona State*	Veterans Field; Wichita, KS	L 0–28	14,001	
September 28	Cincinnati	Veterans Field; Wichita, KS	L 13–19	10,502	
October 5	at Oklahoma State*	Lewis Field; Stillwater, OK	L 0–26	15,000	
October 12	Detroit*	Veterans Field; Wichita, KS	L 0–28	9,200	
October 19	at Hardin–Simmons*	Parramore Stadium; Abilene, TX	L 14–27	4,500–4,800	
November 2	Dayton*	Veterans Field; Wichita, KS	L 13–40	6,903	
November 9	Drake*	Veterans Field; Wichita, KS	W 14–7	6,000	
November 16	Houston	Veterans Field; Wichita, KS	L 6–27	6,000	
November 23	at Villanova*	Villanova Stadium; Villanova, PA	L 6–24	6,200	
November 30	Tulsa	Veterans Field; Wichita, KS	L 0–24	4,844	
*Non-conference game; Source:
