= 1957 Hardin–Simmons Cowboys football team =

American college football season

1957 Hardin–Simmons Cowboys football
- Conference: Border Conference
- Record: 5–5 (3–2 Border)
- Head coach: Sammy Baugh (3rd season)
- Home stadium: Parramore Stadium

1957 Border Conference football standings
	Conf.					Overall
Team	W		L		T	W		L		T
No. 12 Arizona State $	4	–	0	–	0	10	–	0	–	0
West Texas State	3	–	1	–	0	7	–	3	–	0
Texas Western	3	–	2	–	0	6	–	3	–	0
Hardin–Simmons	3	–	2	–	0	5	–	5	–	0
New Mexico A&M	0	–	4	–	0	3	–	7	–	0
Arizona	0	–	4	–	0	1	–	8	–	1
$ – Conference champion; Rankings from AP poll

The 1957 Hardin–Simmons Cowboys football team was an American football team that represented Hardin–Simmons University in the Border Conference during the 1957 college football season. In its third season under head coach Sammy Baugh, the team compiled a 5–5 record (3–2 against conference opponents), tied for third place in the conference, and was outscored by a total of 240 to 211. The team played its home games at Parramore Stadium, also known as Parramore Field, in Abilene, Texas.

Three Hardin-Simmons players were named to the 1957 All-Border Conference football team: guard Joe Biggs; tackle Ted Edmonston; and quarterback Ken Ford.

== Schedule ==
Date	Opponent	Site	Result	Attendance	Source
September 21	at Tulsa*	Skelly Field; Tulsa, OK	W 14–0	16,500	
October 5	at Ole Miss*	Hemingway Stadium; Oxford, MS	L 7–34	12,000	
October 12	at Arizona State	Goodwin Stadium; Tempe, AZ	L 26–35	17,000	
October 19	Wichita*^{†}	Parramore Stadium; Abilene, TX	W 27–14	4,500–4,800	
October 26	at West Texas State	Buffalo Stadium; Canyon, TX	L 13–39		
November 2	Texas Western	Parramore Stadium; Abilene, TX	W 33–20	4,500	
November 9	at Arizona	Arizona Stadium; Tucson, AZ	W 26–20	13,000	
November 16	at Texas Tech*	Jones Stadium; Lubbock, TX	L 21–26	13,000	
November 23	vs. Oklahoma State*	W. T. Barrett Stadium; Odessa, TX	L 7–32	3,500	
November 28	New Mexico A&M	Parramore Stadium; Abilene, TX	W 29–20		
*Non-conference game; ^{†}Homecoming
