= Warren Gaer =

American football player and coach (1912–1997)

Biographical details
- Born: February 7, 1912; Lake Park, Iowa, U.S.
- Died: January 13, 1997 (aged 84); Atlantic, Iowa, U.S.

Playing career
- 1934: Drake

Coaching career (HC unless noted)
- 1946–1948: Pepperdine
- 1949–1958: Drake

Head coaching record
- Overall: 64–49–2 (college)
- Bowls: 1–1

Warren N. Gaer (February 7, 1912 – January 13, 1997) was an American football player and coach. He served as the head football coach at Pepperdine College—now known as Pepperdine University—from 1946 to 1948 and Drake University from 1949 to 1958, compiling a career college football record of 64–49–2.

Pepperdine hired Gaer to form its football program in 1945. He served as head coach there from 1946 to 1948. His teams tallied a mark of 22–6. Gaer died on January 13, 1997, of cancer in his hometown of Atlantic, Iowa.

== Head coaching record ==
| Year | Team | Overall | Conference | Standing | Bowl/playoffs |
|---|---|---|---|---|---|
Pepperdine Waves (Independent) (1946–1948)
| 1946 | Pepperdine | 8–1 | | | W Will Rogers |
| 1947 | Pepperdine | 9–0 | | | |
| 1948 | Pepperdine | 4–5 | | | |
| Pepperdine: | | 21–6 | | | |
Drake Bulldogs (Missouri Valley Conference) (1949–1951)
| 1949 | Drake | 6–2–1 | 3–1 | 2nd | |
| 1950 | Drake | 6–2–1 | 1–2–1 | T–4th | |
| 1951 | Drake | 7–2 | 3–1 | 2nd | |
Drake Bulldogs (Independent) (1952–1958)
| 1952 | Drake | 2–7 | | | |
| 1953 | Drake | 4–4 | | | |
| 1954 | Drake | 2–7 | | | |
| 1955 | Drake | 4–4 | | | |
| 1956 | Drake | 3–6 | | | |
| 1957 | Drake | 7–2 | | | L Sun |
| 1958 | Drake | 2–7 | | | |
| Drake: | | 43–43–2 | 7–4–1 | | |
| Total: | | 64–49–2 | | | |
