= 1957 Memphis State Tigers football team =

American college football season

1957 Memphis State Tigers football
- Conference: Independent
- Record: 6–4
- Head coach: Ralph Hatley (11th season)
- Home stadium: Crump Stadium

1957 Southern non-major college football independents records
	Conf.			Overall
Team	W	L	T	W		L		T
Louisville		–		9	–	1	–	0
Mississippi Southern		–		8	–	3	–	0
Sewanee		–		5	–	2	–	1
Tampa		–		6	–	3	–	0
Abilene Christian		–		5	–	3	–	1
Delaware		–		4	–	3	–	0
Memphis State		–		6	–	4	–	0
Chattanooga		–		4	–	5	–	1
Arkansas State		–		4	–	5	–	0
Howard (AL)		–		4	–	5	–	0
Trinity (TX)		–		3	–	5	–	0
Washington and Lee		–		0	–	8	–	0

The 1957 Memphis State Tigers football team was an American football team that represented Memphis State College (now known as the University of Memphis) as an independent during the 1957 college football season. In their eleventh season under head coach Ralph Hatley, Memphis State compiled a 6–4 record.

== Schedule ==
Date	Opponent	Site	Result	Attendance	Source
September 21	Arkansas Tech	Crump Stadium; Memphis, TN	W 20–6		
September 28	at Mississippi State	Scott Field; Starkville, MS	L 6–10		
October 5	Austin Peay	Crump Stadium; Memphis, TN	W 41–0		
October 12	Tennessee Tech	Crump Stadium; Memphis, TN	W 40–7		
October 19	Mississippi Southern	Crump Stadium; Memphis, TN (rivalry)	L 6–14	10,614	
November 2	at Kentucky	McLean Stadium; Lexington, KY	L 7–53		
November 9	Arkansas State	Crump Stadium; Memphis, TN (rivalry)	W 34–0	4,268	
November 16	at Louisiana Tech	Tech Stadium; Ruston, LA	W 17–7		
November 23	East Tennessee State	Crump Stadium; Memphis, TN	W 24–7		
November 28	at Chattanooga	Chamberlain Field; Chattanooga, TN	L 0–7	4,250	
