= 1957 Arizona Wildcats football team =

American college football season

1957 Arizona Wildcats football
- Conference: Border Conference
- Record: 1–8–1 (0–4 Border)
- Head coach: Ed Doherty (1st season)
- Captains: Allen Polley; Jack Davis
- Home stadium: Arizona Stadium

1957 Border Conference football standings
	Conf.					Overall
Team	W		L		T	W		L		T
No. 12 Arizona State $	4	–	0	–	0	10	–	0	–	0
West Texas State	3	–	1	–	0	7	–	3	–	0
Texas Western	3	–	2	–	0	6	–	3	–	0
Hardin–Simmons	3	–	2	–	0	5	–	5	–	0
New Mexico A&M	0	–	4	–	0	3	–	7	–	0
Arizona	0	–	4	–	0	1	–	8	–	1
$ – Conference champion; Rankings from AP poll

The 1957 Arizona Wildcats football team represented the University of Arizona in the Border Conference during the 1957 college football season. In their first season under head coach Ed Doherty, the Wildcats compiled a 1–8–1 record (0–4 against Border opponents) and were outscored by their opponents, 299 to 125. The team captains were Allen Polley and Jack Davis. The team played its home games in Arizona Stadium in Tucson, Arizona.

The team's statistical leaders included Ralph Hunsaker with 717 passing yards, Tom Dunn with 341 rushing yards, and Gene Leek with 310 receiving yards.

== Schedule ==
Date	Opponent	Site	Result	Attendance	Source
September 21	BYU*	Arizona Stadium; Tucson, AZ	T 14–14	23,000	
September 28	at Missouri*	Memorial Stadium; Columbia, MO	L 13–35	24,500	
October 12	at Colorado*	Folsom Field; Boulder, CO	L 14–34	19,500	
October 19	New Mexico*	Arizona Stadium; Tucson, AZ	L 0–27	23,000	
October 26	Texas Tech*	Arizona Stadium; Tucson, AZ	L 6–28	13,000	
November 2	West Texas State	Arizona Stadium; Tucson, AZ	L 20–21	13,000	
November 9	Hardin–Simmons	Arizona Stadium; Tucson, AZ	L 20–28	13,000	
November 16	Texas Western	Arizona Stadium; Tucson, AZ	L 14–51	12,000	
November 23	Marquette*	Arizona Stadium; Tucson, AZ	W 17–14	14,000	
November 30	at No. 11 Arizona State	Goodwin Stadium; Tempe, AZ (rivalry)	L 7–47	17,000	
*Non-conference game; Rankings from AP Poll released prior to the game
