= 1957 Mississippi Southern Southerners football team =

American college football season

1957 Mississippi Southern Southerners football

Tangerine Bowl, L 9–10 vs. East Texas State
- Conference: Independent
- Record: 8–3
- Head coach: Thad Vann (9th season)
- Home stadium: Faulkner Field; Mississippi Veterans Memorial Stadium

1957 Southern non-major college football independents records
	Conf.			Overall
Team	W	L	T	W		L		T
Louisville		–		9	–	1	–	0
Mississippi Southern		–		8	–	3	–	0
Sewanee		–		5	–	2	–	1
Tampa		–		6	–	3	–	0
Abilene Christian		–		5	–	3	–	1
Delaware		–		4	–	3	–	0
Memphis State		–		6	–	4	–	0
Chattanooga		–		4	–	5	–	1
Arkansas State		–		4	–	5	–	0
Howard (AL)		–		4	–	5	–	0
Trinity (TX)		–		3	–	5	–	0
Washington and Lee		–		0	–	8	–	0

The 1957 Mississippi Southern Southerners football team was an American football team that represented Mississippi Southern College (now known as the University of Southern Mississippi) as an independent during the 1957 college football season. In their ninth year under head coach Thad Vann, the team compiled a 8–3 record.

== Schedule ==
Date	Opponent	Site	Result	Attendance	Source
September 21	at Louisiana Tech	Tech Stadium; Ruston, LA (rivalry)	W 7–0	7,500	
September 28	Trinity (TX)	Faulkner Field; Hattiesburg, MS	W 13–0	7,000	
October 5	vs. West Texas State	Amarillo Stadium; Amarillo, TX	W 34–0	10,000	
October 12	at Southeastern Louisiana	Strawberry Stadium; Hammond, LA	W 14–0	5,000	
October 19	at Memphis State	Crump Stadium; Memphis, TN (rivalry)	W 14–6	10,614	
October 25	at Chattanooga	Chamberlain Field; Chattanooga, TN	W 20–0	6,500	
November 2	Abilene Christian	Faulkner Field; Hattiesburg, MS	W 7–0	11,000	
November 9	Houston	Mississippi Veterans Memorial Stadium; Jackson, MS	L 12–27	11,000	
November 16	Florida State^{†}	Faulkner Field; Hattiesburg, MS	W 20–0	12,500	
November 23	at Alabama	Denny Stadium; Tuscaloosa, AL	L 2–29	18,500	
January 1, 1958	vs. East Texas State	Tangerine Bowl; Orlando, FL (Tangerine Bowl)	L 9–10	12,000	
^{†}Homecoming
