= 1957 North Texas State Eagles football team =

American college football season

1957 North Texas State Eagles football
- Conference: Missouri Valley Conference
- Record: 5–5 (1–0 MVC)
- Head coach: Odus Mitchell (12th season)
- Home stadium: Fouts Field

1957 Missouri Valley Conference football standings
	Conf.					Overall
Team	W		L		T	W		L		T
Houston $	3	–	0	–	0	5	–	4	–	1
North Texas State	1	–	0	–	0	5	–	5	–	0
Tulsa	2	–	2	–	0	4	–	6	–	0
Cincinnati	1	–	2	–	0	5	–	4	–	1
Wichita	0	–	3	–	0	1	–	9	–	0
$ – Conference champion

The 1957 North Texas State Eagles football team was an American football team that represented North Texas State College (now known as the University of North Texas) during the 1957 college football season as a member of the Missouri Valley Conference. In their 12th year under head coach Odus Mitchell, the team compiled a 5–5 record.

The additions of Abner Haynes and Leon King to North Texas State's varsity team in 1957 marked the first time any Black players had suited up for a major college football team in the state of Texas. King scored a touchdown in their season opener against Texas Western on September 21, but North Texas State came up just short in a 14–13 loss.

== Schedule ==
Date	Opponent	Site	Result	Attendance	Source
September 21	at Texas Western*	Kidd Field; El Paso, TX	L 13–14		
September 28	Oklahoma State*	Fouts Field; Denton, TX	L 19–25	8,000	
October 5	Drake*	Fouts Field; Denton, TX	L 6–19		
October 12	at Abilene Christian*	Fair Park Stadium; Abilene, TX	L 20–28		
October 19	at Tulsa	Skelly Field; Tulsa, OK	W 14–12	12,400–12,500	
October 26	at San Jose State*	Spartan Stadium; San Jose, CA	W 12–6	7,500	
November 2	at Trinity (TX)*	Alamo Stadium; San Antonio, TX	L 13–26	2,870	
November 9	Chattanooga*^{†}	Fouts Field; Denton, TX	W 12–0	10,000	
November 16	Youngstown State*	Fouts Field; Denton, TX	W 68–13		
November 23	McMurry*	Fouts Field; Denton, TX	W 14–7		
*Non-conference game; ^{†}Homecoming
