= 1957 Dayton Flyers football team =

American college football season

1957 Dayton Flyers football
- Conference: Independent
- Record: 6–3–1
- Head coach: Bud Kerr (2nd season)
- Home stadium: UD Stadium

1957 Midwestern major college football independents records
	Conf.			Overall
Team	W	L	T	W		L		T
No. 10 Notre Dame		–		7	–	3	–	0
Drake		–		7	–	2	–	0
Detroit		–		6	–	3	–	0
Dayton		–		6	–	3	–	1
Xavier		–		5	–	5	–	0
Marquette		–		0	–	10	–	0
Rankings from AP poll

The 1957 Dayton Flyers football team represented the University of Dayton as an independent during the 1957 college football season. In their second season under head coach Bud Kerr, the Flyers compiled a 6–3–1 record. Dayton played their home games at UD Stadium in Dayton, Ohio.

== Schedule ==
Date	Opponent	Site	Result	Attendance	Source
September 21	at Cincinnati	Nippert Stadium; Cincinnati, OH	T 13–13	19,000	
September 28	Richmond	UD Stadium; Dayton, OH	W 12–7	8,500	
October 5	at Holy Cross	Fitton Field; Worcester, MA	L 6–32	7,000	
October 12	at Boston College	Alumni Stadium; Chestnut Hill, MA	L 14–41	12,000	
October 19	at Louisville	Fairgrounds Stadium; Louisville, KY	L 19–33	12,250	
October 26	Xavier	UD Stadium; Dayton, OH	W 24–13	8,500	
November 2	at Wichita	Veterans Field; Wichita, KS	W 40–13	6,903	
November 9	North Dakota State	UD Stadium; Dayton, OH	W 40–6	8,500	
November 16	Miami (OH)	UD Stadium; Dayton, OH	W 13–7	7,000	
November 23	Detroit	UD Stadium; Dayton, OH	W 20–10	6,395	
