= 1957 Western Michigan Broncos football team =

American college football season

1957 Western Michigan Broncos football
- Conference: Mid-American Conference
- Record: 4–4–1 (1–4–1 MAC)
- Head coach: Merle Schlosser (1st season)
- MVP: Joe Grigg
- Captain: Bob Mason
- Home stadium: Waldo Stadium

1957 Mid-American Conference football standings
	Conf.					Overall
Team	W		L		T	W		L		T
Miami (OH) $	5	–	0	–	0	6	–	3	–	0
Bowling Green	3	–	1	–	2	6	–	1	–	2
Marshall	4	–	2	–	0	6	–	3	–	0
Toledo	3	–	2	–	0	5	–	4	–	0
Western Michigan	1	–	4	–	1	4	–	4	–	1
Ohio	1	–	4	–	1	2	–	6	–	1
Kent State	1	–	5	–	0	3	–	6	–	0
$ – Conference champion

The 1957 Western Michigan Broncos football team represented Western Michigan University in the Mid-American Conference (MAC) during the 1957 college football season. In their first season under head coach Merle Schlosser, the Broncos compiled a 4–4–1 record (1–4–1 against MAC opponents), finished in fifth place in the MAC, and were outscored by their opponents, 150 to 126. The team played its home games at Waldo Stadium in Kalamazoo, Michigan.

Quarterback Bob Mason was the team captain. End Joe Grigg received the team's most outstanding player award.

Merle Schlosser was named head football coach on January 19, 1957. Schlosser was a 29-year old Illinois graduate who had been an assistant coach at Missouri under Don Faurot in 1955 and 1956.

== Schedule ==
Date	Opponent	Site	Result
September 21	at Central Michigan*	Alumni Field; Mount Pleasant, MI (rivalry)	W 33–0
September 28	Miami (OH)	Waldo Stadium; Kalamazoo, MI	L 0–20
October 5	Marshall	Waldo Stadium; Kalamazoo, MI	L 7–12
October 12	at Bowling Green	University Stadium; Bowling Green, OH	T 14–14
October 19	Youngstown State*	Waldo Stadium; Kalamazoo, MI	W 25–14
October 25	at Toledo	Glass Bowl; Toledo, OH	L 16–27
November 2	at Ohio	Peden Stadium; Athens, OH	L 7–20
November 9	Western Reserve*	Waldo Stadium; Kalamazoo, MI	W 20–0
November 16	Kent State	Waldo Stadium; Kalamazoo, MI	W 28–20
*Non-conference game
