= 1957 Texas Tech Red Raiders football team =

American college football season

1957 Texas Tech Red Raiders football
- Conference: Independent
- Record: 2–8
- Head coach: DeWitt Weaver (7th season)
- Offensive scheme: T formation
- Base defense: 5–3
- Home stadium: Jones Stadium

1957 Southern major college football independents records
	Conf.			Overall
Team	W	L	T	W		L		T
No. 5 Navy		–		9	–	1	–	1
Oklahoma State		–		6	–	3	–	1
Miami (FL)		–		5	–	4	–	1
Florida State		–		4	–	6	–	0
Texas Tech		–		2	–	8	–	0
Rankings from AP poll

The 1957 Texas Tech Red Raiders football team represented Texas Technological College—now known as Texas Tech University—as an independent during the 1957 college football season. In their seventh season under head coach DeWitt Weaver, the Red Raiders compiled a 2–8 record and were outscored by opponents by a combined total of 190 to 120. The team's statistical leaders included Jerry Bell with 489 passing yards, Ronnie Rice with 426 rushing yards, and Jimmie Knox with 201 receiving yards. The team played its home games at Clifford B. and Audrey Jones Stadium.

== Schedule ==
Date	Opponent	Site	Result	Attendance	Source
September 21	West Texas State	Jones Stadium; Lubbock, TX	L 0–19	22,000	
September 28	No. 2 Texas A&M	Jones Stadium; Lubbock, TX (rivalry)	L 0–21	27,000	
October 5	LSU	Jones Stadium; Lubbock, TX	L 14–19	16,000–19,278	
October 12	at Texas Western	Kidd Field; El Paso, TX	L 14–26	11,000	
October 19	Baylor	Jones Stadium; Lubbock, TX (rivalry)	L 12–15	23,000	
October 26	at Arizona	Arizona Stadium; Tucson, AZ	W 28–6	13,000	
November 2	at Oklahoma State	Lewis Field; Stillwater, OK	L 0–13	25,000	
November 9	Tulsa^{†}	Jones Stadium; Lubbock, TX	L 0–3	18,500	
November 16	Hardin–Simmons	Jones Stadium; Lubbock, TX	W 26–21	13,000	
November 23	at Arkansas	War Memorial Stadium; Little Rock, AR (rivalry)	L 26–47	19,000	
^{†}Homecoming; Rankings from AP Poll released prior to the game
