= 1957 New Mexico A&M Aggies football team =

American college football season

1957 New Mexico A&M Aggies football
- Conference: Border Conference
- Record: 3–7 (0–4 Border)
- Head coach: Tony Cavallo (3rd season)
- Home stadium: Memorial Stadium

1957 Border Conference football standings
	Conf.					Overall
Team	W		L		T	W		L		T
No. 12 Arizona State $	4	–	0	–	0	10	–	0	–	0
West Texas State	3	–	1	–	0	7	–	3	–	0
Texas Western	3	–	2	–	0	6	–	3	–	0
Hardin–Simmons	3	–	2	–	0	5	–	5	–	0
New Mexico A&M	0	–	4	–	0	3	–	7	–	0
Arizona	0	–	4	–	0	1	–	8	–	1
$ – Conference champion; Rankings from AP poll

The 1957 New Mexico A&M Aggies football team was an American football team that represented New Mexico College of Agriculture and Mechanical Arts (now known as New Mexico State University) as a member of the Border Conference during the 1957 college football season. In their third and final year under head coach Tony Cavallo, the Aggies compiled a 3–7 record (0–4 against conference opponents), finished last in the conference, and were outscored by a total of 215 to 157. The team played home games at Memorial Stadium in Las Cruces, New Mexico.

== Schedule ==
Date	Opponent	Site	Result	Attendance	Source
September 21	at New Mexico*	Zimmerman Field; Albuquerque, NM (rivalry)	L 7–25	12,000	
September 28	Cal Poly*	Memorial Stadium; Las Cruces, NM	L 8–10		
October 5	Corpus Christi*	Memorial Stadium; Las Cruces, NM	W 32–0		
October 19	West Texas State	Memorial Stadium; Las Cruces, NM	L 7–35		
October 26	at Texas Western	Kidd Field; El Paso, TX (rivalry)	L 12–42	8,500	
November 2	at Arizona State	Goodwin Stadium; Tempe, AZ	L 0–21	16,000	
November 9	McMurry*	Memorial Stadium; Las Cruces, NM	L 6–26		
November 16	Omaha*	Memorial Stadium; Las Cruces, NM	W 39–6		
November 23	Western State (CO)*	Memorial Stadium; Las Cruces, NM	W 26–21		
November 28	at Hardin–Simmons	Parramore Stadium; Abilene, TX	L 20–29		
*Non-conference game
