= 1957 Arkansas State Indians football team =

American college football season

1957 Arkansas State Indians football
- Conference: Independent
- Record: 4–5
- Head coach: Gene Harlow (3rd season)
- Home stadium: Kays Stadium

1957 Southern non-major college football independents records
	Conf.			Overall
Team	W	L	T	W		L		T
Louisville		–		9	–	1	–	0
Mississippi Southern		–		8	–	3	–	0
Sewanee		–		5	–	2	–	1
Tampa		–		6	–	3	–	0
Abilene Christian		–		5	–	3	–	1
Delaware		–		4	–	3	–	0
Memphis State		–		6	–	4	–	0
Chattanooga		–		4	–	5	–	1
Arkansas State		–		4	–	5	–	0
Howard (AL)		–		4	–	5	–	0
Trinity (TX)		–		3	–	5	–	0
Washington and Lee		–		0	–	8	–	0

The 1957 Arkansas State Indians football team represented Arkansas State College—now known as Arkansas State University—as an independent during the 1957 college football season. Led by third-year head coach Gene Harlow, the Indians compiled a record of 4–5.

== Schedule ==
Date	Opponent	Site	Result	Attendance	Source
September 28	at Southern Illinois	McAndrew Stadium; Carbondale, IL	W 13–6		
October 5	Florence State	Kays Stadium; Jonesboro, AR	W 15–13		
October 12	at Mississippi State	Scott Field; Starkville, MS	L 13–47	12,000	
October 19	Southeastern Oklahoma State^{†}	Kays Stadium; Jonesboro, AR	W 32–7		
October 26	at Louisiana Tech	Tech Stadium; Ruston, LA	L 19–25		
November 2	Murray State	Kays Stadium; Jonesboro, AR	W 27–20		
November 9	at Memphis State	Crump Stadium; Memphis, TN (rivalry)	L 0–34	4,268	
November 16	at Tennessee Tech	Overall Field; Cookeville, TN	L 6–7		
November 23	Arkansas Tech	Kays Stadium; Jonesboro, AR	L 13–21		
^{†}Homecoming
