= Hal Lahar =

American football player, coach, and administrator (1919–2003)

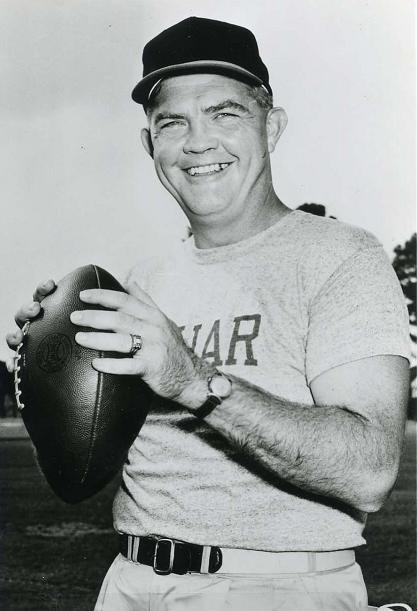
- Lahar at Houston, circa 1957

No. 12, 31, 32
- Position: Guard

Personal information
- Born: July 14, 1919; Durant, Oklahoma, U.S.
- Died: October 20, 2003 (aged 84); Dallas, Texas, U.S.
- Listed height: 6 ft 0 in (1.83 m)
- Listed weight: 225 lb (102 kg)

Career information
- High school: Central (Oklahoma City, Oklahoma)
- College: Oklahoma (1937-1940)
- NFL draft: 1941: 9th round, 79th overall pick

Career history

Playing
- Chicago Bears (1941); Buffalo Bisons / Bills (1946-1948)

Coaching
- Arkansas (1950-1951) Assistant coach; Colgate (1952-1956) Head coach; Houston (1957-1961) Head coach; Colgate (1962-1967) Head coach

Operations
- Colgate (1967-1973) Athletic director

Awards and highlights
- As a player: NFL champion (1941); Pro Bowl (1941); First-team All-Big Six (1940); As a coach: 2× MVC champion (1957, 1959)

Career NFL/AAFC statistics
- Games played: 47
- Games started: 30
- Stats at Pro Football Reference

Head coaching record
- Career: 77–63–10 (.547)

Harold Wade Lahar (July 14, 1919 – October 20, 2003) was an American football player and coach. He served as the head football coach at Colgate University (1952–1956, 1962–1967) and the University of Houston (1957–1961).

Lahar was born in Durant, Oklahoma and attended Central High School in Oklahoma City. He later was an All-Big Six Conference guard for the Oklahoma Sooners under coach Tom Stidham. Lahar was selected 79th overall in the 1941 NFL draft by the Chicago Bears, where he spent the 1941 NFL season before serving in the United States Navy in the South Pacific during World War II.

After leaving the service as a Lieutenant (junior grade) in 1945, Lahar played for the Buffalo Bills of the All-America Football Conference from 1946 to 1948 before beginning his college coaching career as an assistant under Otis Douglas at the University of Arkansas in 1950. In 1952, he became the 25th head coach at Colgate University in Hamilton, New York. In 1957, he succeeded Bill Meek at the University of Houston, where he spent five years, before returning to Colgate in 1962, making him the first man to return to a Division I head-coaching job after leaving for another school. Following the 1967 season, Lahar retired from coaching and served as athletic director at Colgate. His overall coaching record at Colgate was 53–40–8.

Lahar was also assistant commissioner of the Southwest Conference. He worked at the now-defunct SWC from 1973 until his retirement in 1983. Upon his death in 2003, Lahar was buried in the Dallas-Fort Worth National Cemetery.

== Head coaching record ==
Year	Team	Overall	Conference	Standing	Bowl/playoffs
Colgate Red Raiders (Independent) (1952–1956)
1952	Colgate	6–3			
1953	Colgate	3–4–2			
1954	Colgate	5–2–2			
1955	Colgate	6–3			
1956	Colgate	4–5			
Colgate:		24–17–4			
Houston Cougars (Missouri Valley Conference) (1957–1959)
1957	Houston	5–4–1	3–0	1st	
1958	Houston	5–4	2–2	3rd	
1959	Houston	3–7	3–1	1st	
Houston Cougars (Independent) (1960–1961)
1960	Houston	6–4			
1961	Houston	5–4–1			
Houston:		24–23–2	8–3		
Colgate Red Raiders (NCAA University Division independent) (1962–1967)
1962	Colgate	3–5–1			
1963	Colgate	3–4–1			
1964	Colgate	7–2			
1965	Colgate	6–3–1			
1966	Colgate	8–1–1			
1967	Colgate	2–8			
Colgate:		29–23–4			
Total:		77–63–10			
National championship Conference title Conference division title or championship game berth
