= 1958 Tangerine Bowl (January) =

American college football game

East Texas State Lions	Mississippi Southern Southerners
(8–1)	(8–2)
Lone Star Conference	Independent
10	9
Head coach: Jules V. Sikes	Head coach: Thad Vann
	1	2	3	4	Total
East Texas State	7	0	0	3	10
Mississippi Southern	7	0	2	0	9
- Date: January 1, 1958
- Season: 1957
- Stadium: Tangerine Bowl
- Location: Orlando, Florida
- MVP: Norman Roberts, East Texas State
- Referee: P.T. Rahaim
- Attendance: 10,500

The January 1958 Tangerine Bowl was an American college football bowl game played on January 1, 1958, at the Tangerine Bowl stadium in Orlando, Florida. The game pitted the Mississippi Southern Southerners (today's Southern Miss) and the East Texas State Lions (now East Texas A&M University). It was the first of two Tangerine Bowls played in calendar year 1958.

== Background ==
The Lions were champions of the Lone Star Conference after finishing 8–1, with only one conference loss in seven tries. This was their third conference title in four seasons along with their fourth Tangerine Bowl appearance in seven seasons. The Southerners, who were an NCAA College Division independent, finished 8–2, while being invited to their second straight Tangerine Bowl and fourth bowl game in five years.

== Game summary ==
Garry Berry scored a touchdown for the Lions on a three-yard touchdown plunge. The Southerners scored back on a touchdown plunge from quarterback George Sekul. A snap that went over the punter for the Lions sailed into the endzone, giving Mississippi Southern a 9–7 lead. With 7:47 to go in the game, Neal Hinson kicked a 31-yard field goal to put the go-ahead points on the board for the Lions, and they held on to win their second Tangerine Bowl in three appearances.

== Aftermath ==
Mississippi Southern's next bowl was the 1980 Independence Bowl, by which time they were known as the Southern Miss Golden Eagles.
