= George Blackburn (American football) =

American football player, coach, and scout (1913–2006)

Biographical details
- Born: October 14, 1913; Columbus, Ohio, U.S.
- Died: May 15, 2006 (aged 92); Dublin, Ohio, U.S.

Playing career
- c. 1935: Findlay

Coaching career (HC unless noted)
- 1947: Miami (OH) (assistant)
- 1948: Miami (OH)
- 1949–1953: Cincinnati (assistant)
- 1954: Army (assistant)
- 1955–1960: Cincinnati
- 1964: Virginia (assistant)
- 1965–1970: Virginia

Head coaching record
- Overall: 60–61–7

Accomplishments and honors

Championships
- 1 MAC (1948)

Awards
- ACC Coach of the Year (1968)

George Edward "Blackie" Blackburn (October 14, 1913 – May 15, 2006) was an American football player, coach, and scout. He served as the head coach at Miami University (1948), the University of Cincinnati (1955–1960), and the University of Virginia (1965–1970), compiling a career college football head coaching record of 60–61–7. Blackburn was also an assistant coach under coaching legends Sid Gillman at Miami and Cincinnati and under Earl Blaik at the United States Military Academy.

== Early life ==
A native of Columbus, Ohio, Blackburn graduated from Findlay College in 1936. At Findlay he played football and baseball.

== Coaching career ==
=== Miami ===
As an assistant, Blackburn helped Sid Gillman lead the Miami Redskins to a victory over Texas Tech in the 1948 Sun Bowl. Blackburn was named head coach for the 1948 season after Gillman left. Blackburn stayed at Miami's head coach for one season guiding the team to 7–1–1 record and the 1948 Mid-American Conference championship. In 1949, Gillman took the head coaching position at the University of Cincinnati and Blackburn his assistant coach there. Woody Hayes succeeded Blackburn at Miami for the 1949 season.

=== Cincinnati ===
When Gillman left Cincinnati for the Los Angeles Rams for the 1955 season, Blackburn replaced him again. In his six years as the Bearcats' head coach, he compiled an overall record of 25–27–6.

=== Virginia ===
Blackburn was an assistant under Bill Elias for one season at the University of Virginia before being named head coach in 1965. During his six years as the Cavaliers' head coach, he compiled an overall record of 28–33. In 1968, he was named Atlantic Coast Conference Coach of the Year after leading the Cavaliers to a 7–3 record.

== Scouting career ==
After leaving Virginia, Blackburn spent 17 years as a professional football scout with the New Orleans Saints, Houston Oilers, and New England Patriots of the National Football League (NFL).

== Death ==
Blackburn died on May 15, 2006, in Dublin, Ohio. He is buried at Saint Joseph Cemetery in Lockbourne, Ohio.

== Head coaching record ==
| Year | Team | Overall | Conference | Standing | Bowl/playoffs |
|---|---|---|---|---|---|
Miami Redskins (Mid-American Conference) (1948)
| 1948 | Miami | 7–1–1 | 4–0 | 1st | |
| Miami: | | 7–1–1 | 4–0 | | |
Cincinnati Bearcats (Independent) (1955–1956)
| 1955 | Cincinnati | 1–6–2 | | | |
| 1956 | Cincinnati | 4–5 | | | |
Cincinnati Bearcats (Missouri Valley Conference) (1957–1960)
| 1957 | Cincinnati | 5–4–1 | 1–3–1 | 4th | |
| 1958 | Cincinnati | 6–2–2 | 1–1–2 | T–2nd | |
| 1959 | Cincinnati | 5–4–1 | 0–3–1 | 5th | |
| 1960 | Cincinnati | 4–6 | 1–2 | 3rd | |
| Cincinnati: | | 25–27–6 | 3–9–4 | | |
Virginia Cavaliers (Atlantic Coast Conference) (1965–1970)
| 1965 | Virginia | 4–6 | 2–4 | 7th | |
| 1966 | Virginia | 4–6 | 3–3 | T–3rd | |
| 1967 | Virginia | 5–5 | 3–3 | 4th | |
| 1968 | Virginia | 7–3 | 4–2 | 3rd | |
| 1969 | Virginia | 3–7 | 1–5 | 8th | |
| 1970 | Virginia | 5–6 | 0–6 | 8th | |
| Virginia: | | 28–33 | 13–23 | | |
| Total: | | 60–61–7 | | | |
National championship Conference title Conference division title or championship game berth
