= Woody Woodard =

American football player and sports coach

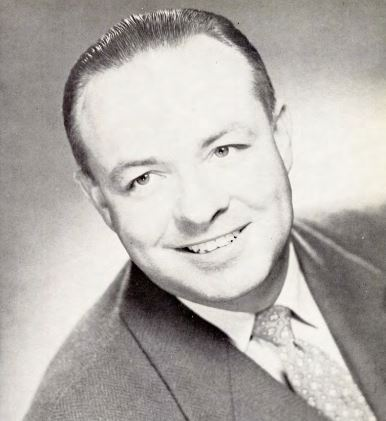

Biographical details
- Born: c. 1917; Wichita, Kansas, U.S.
- Died: December 9, 1996 (aged 79); Wichita, Kansas, U.S.

Playing career

Football
- c. 1935: Southwestern (KS)

Coaching career (HC unless noted)

Football
- 1943–1949: Lawrence HS (KS)
- 1950–1952: McPherson
- 1953–1956: SMU
- 1957–1959: Wichita

Head coaching record
- Overall: 47–45–4 (college football)

Chalmer E. Woodard (c. 1917 – December 9, 1996) was an American football player, coach of football, basketball, and track, and college athletics administrator. He served as the head football coach at McPherson College from 1950 to 1952, at Southern Methodist University (SMU) from 1953 to 1956, and at the Municipal University of Wichita—now known as the University of Wichita—from 1957 to 1959, compiling a career college football record of 47–45–4.

== Coaching career ==
=== McPherson ===
Woodard was the head football, basketball and track coach and athletic director at McPherson College in McPherson, Kansas from 1950 to 1952. His football coaching record at McPherson was 18–7–1.

=== SMU ===
Woodard left McPherson to become the head football coach at Southern Methodist University in Dallas, Texas. He resigned as SMU coach after two consecutive losing seasons in 1956.

=== Wichita State ===
Soon after leaving SMU, Woodard signed a three-year contract to coach the University of Wichita (now Wichita State University) in his hometown of Wichita, Kansas and he held that position for three seasons, from 1957 until 1959. His record at Wichita was 10–18–2. After three seasons, his contract was not renewed.

== Head coaching record ==
=== College football ===
Year	Team	Overall	Conference	Standing	Coaches^{#}
McPherson Bulldogs (Kansas Collegiate Athletic Conference) (1950–1952)
1950	McPherson	8–0–1	6–0	1st	
1951	McPherson	7–2	5–1	2nd	
1952	McPherson	3–5	2–4	5th	
McPherson:		18–7–1	13–5		
SMU Mustangs (Southwest Conference) (1953–1956)
1953	SMU	5–5	3–3	4th	
1954	SMU	6–3–1	4–1–1	2nd	17
1955	SMU	4–6	2–4	T–5th	
1956	SMU	4–6	2–4	5th	
SMU:		19–20–1	11–12–1		
Wichita Shockers (Missouri Valley Conference) (1957–1959)
1957	Wichita	1–9	0–3	5th	
1958	Wichita	4–5–1	1–2–1	5th	
1959	Wichita	5–4–1	1–2–1	4th	
Wichita:		10–18–2	2–7–2		
Total:		47–45–4			
National championship Conference title Conference division title or championship game berth
