= Thad Vann =

American football and baseball coach (1907–1982)

Biographical details
- Born: September 22, 1907; Magnolia, Mississippi, U.S.
- Died: September 7, 1982 (aged 74); Jackson, Mississippi, U.S.

Playing career

Football
- 1926–1928: Ole Miss
- Position: Tackle

Coaching career (HC unless noted)

Football
- 1937–1948: Mississippi Southern (assistant)
- 1949–1968: Mississippi Southern / Southern Miss

Baseball
- 1948–1949: Mississippi Southern

Head coaching record
- Overall: 139–59–2 (football); 21–21 (baseball)
- Bowls: 0–4

Accomplishments and honors

Championships
- Football; 2 UPI small college (1958, 1962); 2 Gulf States (1950–1951)

Awards
- Mississippi Sports Hall of Fame (1971); Ole Miss Sports Hall of Fame (1987)
- College Football Hall of Fame; Inducted in 1987 (profile)

Thad "Pie" Vann (September 22, 1907 – September 7, 1982) was an American football and baseball coach. He served as the head football coach at the University of Southern Mississippi—known as Mississippi Southern College prior to 1962—from 1949 to 1968. During his tenure, he compiled a 139–59–2 record and helped transform Mississippi Southern into one of the nation's elite programs. His only losing season came in 1968, after 19 consecutive winning seasons. His 1953 team went 9–2, including a major upset against Alabama. His 1954 team went 6–4 and upset Alabama once again. He was also the head baseball coach at Mississippi Southern from 1948 to 1949, tallying a mark of 21–21. Van died on September 7, 1982, at Veterans Administration Hospital in Jackson, Mississippi, following long illness. He was inducted into the College Football Hall of Fame in 1987.

== Head coaching record ==
=== Football ===
Year	Team	Overall	Conference	Standing	Bowl/playoffs
Mississippi Southern Southerners (Gulf States Conference) (1949–1951)
1949	Mississippi Southern	7–3	2–1	2nd	
1950	Mississippi Southern	5–5	3–1	1st	
1951	Mississippi Southern	6–5	4–0	1st	
Mississippi Southern / Southern Miss Southerners (NCAA College Division independent) (1952–1959)
1952	Mississippi Southern	10–2			L Sun
1953	Mississippi Southern	9–2			L Sun
1954	Mississippi Southern	6–4			
1955	Mississippi Southern	9–1			
1956	Mississippi Southern	7–2–1			L Tangerine
1957	Mississippi Southern	8–3			L Tangerine
1958	Mississippi Southern	9–0			
1959	Mississippi Southern	6–4			
1960	Mississippi Southern	6–4			
1961	Mississippi Southern	8–2			
1962	Southern Miss	9–1			
Southern Miss Southerners (NCAA University Division independent) (1963–1968)
1963	Southern Miss	5–3–1			
1964	Southern Miss	6–3			
1965	Southern Miss	7–2			
1966	Southern Miss	6–4			
1967	Southern Miss	6–3			
1968	Southern Miss	4–6			
Southern Miss:		139–59–2	9–2		
Total:		139–59–2			
National championship Conference title Conference division title or championship game berth
