= 1957 Missouri Tigers football team =

American college football season

1957 Missouri Tigers football
- Conference: Big Seven Conference
- Record: 5–4–1 (3–3 Big 7)
- Head coach: Frank Broyles (1st season)
- Home stadium: Memorial Stadium

1957 Big Seven Conference football standings
	Conf.					Overall
Team	W		L		T	W		L		T
No. 4 Oklahoma $	6	–	0	–	0	10	–	1	–	0
Kansas	4	–	2	–	0	5	–	4	–	1
Missouri	3	–	3	–	0	5	–	4	–	1
Colorado	3	–	3	–	0	6	–	3	–	1
Iowa State	2	–	4	–	0	4	–	5	–	1
Kansas State	2	–	4	–	0	3	–	6	–	1
Nebraska	1	–	5	–	0	1	–	9	–	0
$ – Conference champion; Rankings from AP Poll

The 1957 Missouri Tigers football team was an American football team that represented the University of Missouri in the Big Seven Conference (Big 7) during the 1957 college football season. The team compiled a 5–4–1 record (3–3 in conference, third) and was outscored by its opponents 157 to 149. Frank Broyles was the head coach for the first and only season. The five home games were played on campus at Memorial Stadium in Columbia, Missouri.

Missouri's statistical leaders included Hank Kuhlman with 554 rushing yards, 569 yards of total offense, and 48 points scored, Phil Snowden with 299 passing yards and 567 yards of total offense, and Charley James with 132 receiving yards.

Hired in early January, Broyles was previously the backfield coach for six years at Georgia Tech, his alma mater. After his only season with Missouri, he departed for Arkansas of the Southwest Conference and was succeeded by Dan Devine. Hired in mid-December, Devine was previously the head coach for three seasons at Arizona State College in the Border Conference. He led the Sun Devils to an undefeated 10–0 record during his final season in Tempe, finishing twelfth in both polls.

== Schedule ==
Date	Opponent	Rank	Site	Result	Attendance	Source
September 21	at Vanderbilt*		Dudley Field; Nashville, TN	T 7–7	18,926	
September 28	Arizona*		Memorial Stadium; Columbia, MO	W 35–13	24,500	
October 5	No. 5 Texas A&M*		Memorial Stadium; Columbia, MO	L 0–28	26,250	
October 11	at SMU*		Cotton Bowl; Dallas, TX	W 7–6	26,500	
October 19	at Iowa State		Clyde Williams Field; Ames, IA (rivalry)	W 35–13	16,000	
October 26	Nebraska		Memorial Stadium; Columbia, MO (rivalry)	W 14–13	23,000	
November 2	at No. 18 Colorado		Folsom Field; Boulder, CO	W 9–6	41,000	
November 9	No. 2 Oklahoma	No. 19	Memorial Stadium; Columbia, MO (rivalry)	L 14–39	39,500	
November 16	Kansas State		Memorial Stadium; Columbia, MO	L 21–23	20,000	
November 23	at Kansas		Memorial Stadium; Lawrence, KS (Border War)	L 7–9	32,000	
*Non-conference game; Rankings from AP Poll released prior to the game; Source:
