= 1957 Appalachian State Mountaineers football team =

American college football season

1957 Appalachian State Mountaineers football
- Conference: North State Conference
- Record: 4–6 (2–4 NSC)
- Head coach: Bob Broome (2nd season)
- Home stadium: College Field

1957 North State Conference football standings
	Conf.					Overall
Team	W		L		T	W		L		T
Lenoir Rhyne $	5	–	1	–	0	8	–	2	–	1
Elon	4	–	0	–	0	6	–	0	–	0
Catawba	3	–	2	–	0	4	–	3	–	0
Western Carolina	2	–	2	–	1	2	–	5	–	1
Appalachian State	2	–	4	–	0	4	–	6	–	0
Guilford	1	–	3	–	1	1	–	6	–	1
East Carolina	0	–	5	–	0	1	–	8	–	0
$ – Conference champion

The 1957 Appalachian State Mountaineers football team was an American football team that represented Appalachian State Teachers College (now known as Appalachian State University) as a member of the North State Conference during the 1957 NAIA football season. In their second year under head coach Bob Broome, the Mountaineers compiled an overall record of 4–6, with a mark of 2–4 in conference play, and finished fifth in the NSC.

== Schedule ==
Date	Opponent	Site	Result	Attendance	Source
September 14	Presbyterian*	College Field; Boone, NC	W 20–7	4,500	
September 21	at East Tennessee State*	College Stadium; Johnson City, TN	L 7–20		
September 28	Western Carolina	College Field; Boone, NC (rivalry)	W 25–0		
October 5	at Elon	Burlington Municipal Stadium; Burlington, NC	L 6–21		
October 12	Lenoir Rhyne	College Field; Boone, NC	L 0–38	5,100	
October 19	at Catawba	Shuford Stadium; Salisbury, NC	L 0–19		
October 26	Emory & Henry*^{†}	College Field; Boone, NC	W 19–7		
November 2	at East Carolina	College Stadium; Greenville, NC	W 7–6		
November 9	at Guilford	Greensboro, NC	L 7–14		
November 16	at Tampa*	Phillips Field; Tampa, FL	L 9–26		
*Non-conference game; ^{†}Homecoming
