= 1957 Holy Cross Crusaders football team =

American college football season

1957 Holy Cross Crusaders football
- Conference: Independent
- Record: 5–3–1
- Head coach: Eddie Anderson (14th season)
- Captain: Richard H. Surrette
- Home stadium: Fitton Field

1957 Eastern major college football independents records
| | Conf. | | | Overall |
| Team | W | L | T | W | | L | | T |
|---|---|---|---|---|---|---|---|---|
| No. 18 Army | | – | | 7 | – | 2 | – | 0 |
| Penn State | | – | | 6 | – | 3 | – | 0 |
| Boston University | | – | | 5 | – | 3 | – | 0 |
| Holy Cross | | – | | 5 | – | 3 | – | 1 |
| Syracuse | | – | | 5 | – | 3 | – | 1 |
| Pittsburgh | | – | | 4 | – | 6 | – | 0 |
| Colgate | | – | | 3 | – | 6 | – | 0 |
| Villanova | | – | | 3 | – | 6 | – | 0 |
Rankings from AP poll

The 1957 Holy Cross Crusaders football team was an American football team that represented the College of the Holy Cross as an independent during the 1957 college football season. In its 14th year under head coach Eddie Anderson, the team compiled a 5–3–1 record. The team played its home games at Fitton Field on the college's campus in Worcester, Massachusetts.

== Schedule ==
| Date | Opponent | Site | Result | Attendance | Source |
|---|---|---|---|---|---|
| September 28 | VMI | Fitton Field; Worcester, MA | T 21–21 | 10,000 | |
| October 5 | Dayton | Fitton Field; Worcester, MA | W 32–6 | 7,000 | |
| October 12 | at Marquette | Milwaukee County Stadium; Milwaukee, WI | W 26–7 | 9,420 | |
| October 19 | Dartmouth^{†} | Fitton Field; Worcester, MA | L 7–14 | 19,000 | |
| October 26 | at Boston University | Boston University Field; Boston, MA | L 28–35 | 10,500 | |
| November 3 | Quantico Marines | Fitton Field; Worcester, MA | W 33–14 | 7,500 | |
| November 9 | at Syracuse | Archbold Stadium; Syracuse, NY | W 20–19 | 15,000 | |
| November 16 | Penn State^ | Fitton Field; Worcester, MA | L 10–14 | 18,000 | |
| November 30 | Boston College | Fitton Field; Worcester, MA (rivalry) | W 14–0 | 34,176 | |
^{†}Homecoming; ^ Family weekend

== Statistical leaders ==
Statistical leaders for the 1957 Crusaders included:

- Rushing: Dick Surrette, 216 yards and 1 touchdown on 70 attempts
- Passing: Tom Greene, 1,297 yards, 44 completions and 11 touchdowns on 159 attempts
- Receiving: Dick Berardino, 420 yards and 4 touchdowns on 22 receptions
- Scoring: Tom Greene, 45 points on 5 touchdowns and 15 PATs
- Total offense: Tom Greene, 1,381 yards (1,297 passing, 84 rushing)
- All-purpose yards: Dick Berardino, 420 yards (all rushing)
