= 1957 East Tennessee State Buccaneers football team =

American college football season

1957 East Tennessee State Buccaneers football
- Conference: Volunteer State Athletic Conference
- Record: 5–6 (2–0 VSAC)
- Head coach: Star Wood (5th season)
- Home stadium: College Stadium

The 1957 East Tennessee State Buccaneers football team was an American football team that represented East Tennessee State College (ETSC), now known as East Tennessee State University, as a member of the Volunteer State Athletic Conference (VSAC) during the 1957 college football season. Led by fifth-year head coach Star Wood, the Buccaneers compiled an overall record of 5–6.

== Schedule ==
Date	Opponent	Site	Result	Attendance	Source
September 14	at Furman*	Sirrine Stadium; Greenville, SC	L 7–13		
September 21	Appalachian State*	College Stadium; Johnson City, TN	W 20–7		
September 28	at Western Kentucky*	Bowling Green, KY	L 6–10		
October 5	Western Carolina*	College Stadium; Johnson City, TN	W 7–6		
October 13	at Maryville (TN)	Honaker Field; Maryville, TN	W 40–0		
October 19	Eastern Kentucky*^{†}	College Stadium; Johnson City, TN	W 27–13	4,000	
October 26	at Florence State*	Municipal Stadium; Florence, AL	L 13–19		
November 2	Wofford*	College Stadium; Johnson City, TN	L 13–19		
November 9	Austin Peay	College Stadium; Johnson City, TN	W 13–7		
November 16	at Middle Tennessee*	Horace Jones Field; Murfreesboro, TN	L 7–33		
November 23	at Memphis State*	Crump Stadium; Memphis, TN	L 7–24		
*Non-conference game; ^{†}Homecoming; Source:
