= 1957 Colgate Red Raiders football team =

American college football season

1957 Colgate Red Raiders football
- Conference: Independent
- Record: 3–6
- Head coach: Fred Rice (1st season)
- Captain: Ralph Antone
- Home stadium: Colgate Athletic Field

1957 Eastern major college football independents records
	Conf.			Overall
Team	W	L	T	W		L		T
No. 18 Army		–		7	–	2	–	0
Penn State		–		6	–	3	–	0
Boston University		–		5	–	3	–	0
Holy Cross		–		5	–	3	–	1
Syracuse		–		5	–	3	–	1
Pittsburgh		–		4	–	6	–	0
Colgate		–		3	–	6	–	0
Villanova		–		3	–	6	–	0
Rankings from AP poll

The 1957 Colgate Red Raiders football team was an American football team that represented Colgate University as an independent during the 1957 college football season. Following the offseason departure of head coach Hal Lahar, the school promoted Fred Rice, its former backfield coach, who led the team to a 3–6 record. Ralph Antone was the team captain.

The team played its home games at Colgate Athletic Field in Hamilton, New York.

== Schedule ==
Date	Opponent	Site	Result	Attendance	Source
September 28	at Cornell	Schoellkopf Field; Ithaca, NY (rivalry)	W 14–13	13,000	
October 5	at Illinois	Memorial Stadium; Champaign, IL	L 0–40	41,594	
October 12	Rutgers^{†}	Colgate Athletic Field; Hamilton, NY	L 6–48	7,000	
October 19	at Princeton	Palmer Stadium; Princeton, NJ	W 12–10	25,000	
October 26	at Yale	Yale Bowl; New Haven, CT	L 0–20	36,564	
November 2	at No. 9 Army	Michie Stadium; West Point, NY	L 7–53	25,450	
November 9	Bucknell	Colgate Athletic Field; Hamilton, NY	W 32–0		
November 16	at Syracuse	Archbold Stadium; Syracuse, NY (rivalry)	L 6–34	38,500	
November 28	at Brown	Brown Stadium; Providence, RI	L 7–33	10,500	
^{†}Homecoming; Rankings from AP Poll released prior to the game

== Leading players ==
Statistical leaders for the 1957 Red Raiders included:

- Rushing: Ted Boccuzzi, 369 yards and 2 touchdowns on 100 attempts
- Passing: Raymond Harding, 762 yards, 64 completions and 7 touchdowns on 152 attempts
- Receiving: Alfred Jamison, 420 yards and 6 touchdowns on 33 receptions
- Total offense: Raymond Harding, 702 yards (762 passing, minus-60 rushing)
- Scoring: Al Jamison, 36 points from 6 touchdowns
- All-purpose yards: Ted Boccuzzi, 657 yards (369 rushing, 112 kickoff returning, 107 receiving, 69 punt returning)
