= 1957 Army Cadets football team =

American college football season

1957 Army Cadets football
- Conference: Independent

Ranking
- Coaches: No. 13
- AP: No. 18
- Record: 7–2
- Head coach: Earl Blaik (17th season)
- Captain: James Kernan
- Home stadium: Michie Stadium

1957 Eastern major college football independents records
	Conf.			Overall
Team	W	L	T	W		L		T
No. 18 Army		–		7	–	2	–	0
Penn State		–		6	–	3	–	0
Boston University		–		5	–	3	–	0
Holy Cross		–		5	–	3	–	1
Syracuse		–		5	–	3	–	1
Pittsburgh		–		4	–	6	–	0
Colgate		–		3	–	6	–	0
Villanova		–		3	–	6	–	0
Rankings from AP poll

The 1957 Army Cadets football team represented the United States Military Academy as an independent during the 1957 college football season. In their 17th year under head coach Earl Blaik, the Cadets compiled a 7–2 record and outscored their opponents 251 to 129.

In the annual Army–Navy Game at Philadelphia, the Cadets lost 14–0 to the Midshipmen. Army's other loss was in the same stadium, by two points to Notre Dame in mid-October.

Two Army players were honored on the All-America Team; sophomore back Bob Anderson was a consensus first-team selection, and center Jim Kernan was a second-team selection of the International News Service (INS).

== Schedule ==
Date	Time	Opponent	Rank	Site	TV	Result	Attendance	Source
September 28		Nebraska		Michie Stadium; West Point, NY		W 42–0	20,500	
October 5		at Penn State	No. 12	New Beaver Field; University Park, PA		W 27–13	32,660	
October 12		vs. No. 12 Notre Dame	No. 10	Philadelphia Municipal Stadium; Philadelphia, PA (rivalry)		L 21–23	95,000	
October 19		No. 16 Pittsburgh	No. 19	Michie Stadium; West Point, NY		W 29–13	27,550	
October 26		at Virginia	No. 9	Scott Stadium; Charlottesville, VA		W 20–12	24,000–25,000	
November 2		Colgate	No. 9	Michie Stadium; West Point, NY		W 53–7	25,450	
November 9		Utah	No. 8	Michie Stadium; West Point, NY		W 39–33	25,500–27,900	
November 16		Tulane	No. 10	Michie Stadium; West Point, NY		W 20–14	21,000–21,125	
November 30	1:15 p.m.	vs. No. 8 Navy	No. 10	Philadelphia Municipal Stadium; Philadelphia, PA (Army–Navy Game)	NBC	L 0–14	100,000–101,000	
Rankings from AP Poll released prior to the game; Source:

== Roster ==
1957 Army Cadets football team roster
Players
Coaches
Offense

Pos.	#	Name	Class
HB	21	Bob Anderson	So
FB	32	Vince Barta	Sr
QB	11	Dave Bourland	Sr
HB	24	Pete Dawkins	Jr
C	51	Jim Kernan (C)	Sr
OT	72	Bill Melnik	Sr
G		Bob Novogratz	Jr

Defense

Pos.	#	Name	Class

Special teams

Pos.	#	Name	Class
P	32	Vince Barta	Sr
PK		Maurice Hilliard	Jr

Head coach

- Earl Blaik (17th year)

Coordinators/assistant coaches

Legend

- (C) Team captain
- (S) Suspended
- (I) Ineligible
- Injured
- Redshirt
