= 1957 Davidson Wildcats football team =

American college football season

1957 Davidson Wildcats football
- Conference: Southern Conference
- Record: 5–3 (1–3 SoCon)
- Head coach: Bill Dole (6th season)
- Home stadium: Richardson Stadium

1957 Southern Conference football standings
	Conf.					Overall
Team	W		L		T	W		L		T
No. 20 VMI $	6	–	0	–	0	9	–	0	–	1
West Virginia	3	–	0	–	0	7	–	2	–	1
The Citadel	4	–	2	–	0	5	–	4	–	1
Furman	2	–	1	–	0	3	–	7	–	0
Richmond	2	–	4	–	0	4	–	6	–	0
William & Mary	2	–	4	–	0	4	–	6	–	0
Davidson	1	–	3	–	0	5	–	3	–	0
VPI	1	–	3	–	0	4	–	5	–	0
George Washington	1	–	5	–	0	2	–	7	–	0
Washington and Lee	0	–	0	–	0	0	–	8	–	0
$ – Conference champion; Rankings from AP Poll

The 1957 Davidson Wildcats football team represented Davidson College as a member of the Southern Conference (SoCon) during the 1957 college football season. Led by sixth-year head coach Bill Dole, the Wildcats compiled an overall record of 5–3 with a mark of 1–3 in conference play, tying for seventh in the SoCon.

== Schedule ==
Date	Opponent	Site	Result	Attendance	Source
September 20	vs. Catawba*	American Legion Memorial Stadium; Charlotte, NC	W 26–7	2,000	
September 28	at East Carolina*	College Stadium; Greenville, NC	W 19–6	5,500	
October 5	The Citadel	Richardson Stadium; Davidson, NC	L 7–21		
October 12	at VMI	Alumni Field; Lexington, VA	L 14–26	4,000	
October 19	West Virginia Tech*	Richardson Stadium; Davidson, NC	W 33–14		
November 9	Wofford*	Richardson Stadium; Davidson, NC	W 16–7	8,000	
November 16	at Richmond	City Stadium; Richmond, VA	W 23–19	1,000	
November 22	at Furman	Sirrine Stadium; Greenville, SC	L 2–6		
*Non-conference game
