= 1957 Middle Tennessee Blue Raiders football team =

American college football season

1957 Middle Tennessee Blue Raiders football

OVC champion
- Conference: Ohio Valley Conference
- Record: 10–0 (5–0 OVC)
- Head coach: Charles M. Murphy (11th season)
- Captains: B. Rolman; R. Massey
- Home stadium: Horace Jones Field

1957 Ohio Valley Conference football standings
| | Conf. | | | | | Overall |
| Team | W | | L | | T | W | | L | | T |
|---|---|---|---|---|---|---|---|---|---|---|
| Middle Tennessee $ | 5 | – | 0 | – | 0 | 10 | – | 0 | – | 0 |
| Tennessee Tech | 4 | – | 1 | – | 0 | 6 | – | 4 | – | 0 |
| Eastern Kentucky | 3 | – | 2 | – | 0 | 4 | – | 5 | – | 0 |
| Western Kentucky | 1 | – | 3 | – | 1 | 5 | – | 3 | – | 1 |
| Murray State | 1 | – | 3 | – | 1 | 3 | – | 5 | – | 1 |
| Morehead State | 0 | – | 5 | – | 0 | 2 | – | 7 | – | 0 |
$ – Conference champion

The 1957 Middle Tennessee Blue Raiders football team represented the Middle Tennessee State College—now known as Middle Tennessee State University—as a member of the Ohio Valley Conference (OVC) during the 1957 college football season. Led by 11-year head coach Charles M. Murphy, the Blue Raiders compiled a record an overall record of 10–0 with a mark of 5–0 in conference play, winning the OVC title. The team's captains were B. Rolman and R. Massey.

== Schedule ==
| Date | Opponent | Site | Result | Source |
|---|---|---|---|---|
| September 14 | at Florence State* | Florence, AL | W 26–0 | |
| September 28 | Jacksonville State* | Horace Jones Field; Murfreesboro, TN | W 25–0 | |
| October 4 | Western Kentucky | Horace Jones Field; Murfreesboro, TN (rivalry) | W 26–7 | |
| October 12 | at Eastern Kentucky | Richmond, KY | W 35–14 | |
| October 19 | Chattanooga* | Horace Jones Field; Murfreesboro, TN | W 20–6 | |
| October 26 | at Morehead State | Morehead, KY | W 18–6 | |
| November 2 | at Austin Peay* | Clarksville Municipal Stadium; Clarksville, TN | W 14–0 | |
| November 9 | at Murray State | Cutchin Stadium; Murray, KY | W 22–0 | |
| November 16 | East Tennessee State* | Horace Jones Field; Murfreesboro, TN | W 33–7 | |
| November 28 | Tennessee Tech | Horace Jones Field; Murfreesboro, TN | W 22-0 | |
*Non-conference game

== After the season ==
=== NFL draft ===
The following Blue Raiders were selected in the 1958 NFL draft following the season.

| Round | Pick | Player | Position | NFL club |
|---|---|---|---|---|
| 26 | 313 | Joe Bruce | Tackle | Detroit Lions |
| 30 | 352 | Bobby Halum | Back | Chicago Bears |
