= 1957 Kansas Jayhawks football team =

American college football season

1957 Kansas Jayhawks football
- Conference: Big Seven Conference
- Record: 5–4–1 (4–2 Big 7)
- Head coach: Chuck Mather (4th season)
- Captains: Lynn McCarthy; Wally Strauch; Bob Kraus
- Home stadium: Memorial Stadium

1957 Big Seven Conference football standings
	Conf.					Overall
Team	W		L		T	W		L		T
No. 4 Oklahoma $	6	–	0	–	0	10	–	1	–	0
Kansas	4	–	2	–	0	5	–	4	–	1
Missouri	3	–	3	–	0	5	–	4	–	1
Colorado	3	–	3	–	0	6	–	3	–	1
Iowa State	2	–	4	–	0	4	–	5	–	1
Kansas State	2	–	4	–	0	3	–	6	–	1
Nebraska	1	–	5	–	0	1	–	9	–	0
$ – Conference champion; Rankings from AP Poll

The 1957 Kansas Jayhawks football team represented the University of Kansas in the Big Seven Conference during the 1957 college football season. In their fourth and final season under head coach Chuck Mather, the Jayhawks compiled a 5–4–1 record (4–2 against conference opponents), finished second in the Big Seven Conference, and were outscored by all opponents by a combined total of 230 to 115. They played two ranked teams, losing to No. 2 Oklahoma by a 47–0 score and to No. 9 Oregon State by a 34–6 score. They played their home games at Memorial Stadium in Lawrence, Kansas.

The team's statistical leaders included Homer Floyd with 505 rushing yards and 189 receiving yards and Wally Strauch with 320 passing yards. Lynn McCarthy, Wally Strauch, and Bob Kraus were the team captains.

== Schedule ==
Date	Opponent	Site	Result	Attendance	Source
September 21	at TCU*	Amon G. Carter Stadium; Fort Worth, TX	T 13–13	15,000	
September 28	No. 9 Oregon State*	Memorial Stadium; Lawrence, KS	L 6–34	28,000	
October 5	at Colorado	Folsom Field; Boulder, CO	W 35–34	34,000	
October 12	Iowa State	Memorial Stadium; Lawrence, KS	L 6–21	21,000	
October 19	at No. 2 Oklahoma	Oklahoma Memorial Stadium; Norman, OK	L 0–47	50,000	
October 25	at Miami (FL)*	Burdine Stadium; Miami, FL	L 6–48	33,280	
November 2	at Nebraska	Memorial Stadium; Lincoln, NE (rivalry)	W 14–12	31,000	
November 9	Kansas State	Memorial Stadium; Lawrence, KS (rivalry)	W 13–7	26,000	
November 16	Oklahoma State*	Memorial Stadium; Lawrence, KS	W 13–7	12,000	
November 23	Missouri^{†}	Memorial Stadium; Lawrence, KS (Border War)	W 9–7	32,000	
*Non-conference game; ^{†}Homecoming; Rankings from AP Poll released prior to the game; Source:
