= 1957 Pittsburgh Panthers football team =

American college football season

1957 Pittsburgh Panthers football
- Conference: Independent
- Record: 4–6
- Head coach: John Michelosen (3rd season)
- Home stadium: Pitt Stadium

1957 Eastern major college football independents records
	Conf.			Overall
Team	W	L	T	W		L		T
No. 18 Army		–		7	–	2	–	0
Penn State		–		6	–	3	–	0
Boston University		–		5	–	3	–	0
Holy Cross		–		5	–	3	–	1
Syracuse		–		5	–	3	–	1
Pittsburgh		–		4	–	6	–	0
Colgate		–		3	–	6	–	0
Villanova		–		3	–	6	–	0
Rankings from AP poll

The 1957 Pittsburgh Panthers football team represented the University of Pittsburgh as an independent during the 1957 college football season. The team compiled a 4–6 record under head coach John Michelosen. The team played their home games at Pitt Stadium in Pittsburgh.

== Schedule ==
Date	Opponent	Rank	Site	Result	Attendance	Source
September 21	No. 1 Oklahoma	No. 8	Pitt Stadium; Pittsburgh, PA	L 0–26	58,942	
September 28	at Oregon	No. 16	Multnomah Stadium; Portland, OR	W 6–3	20,486	
October 4	at USC		Los Angeles Memorial Coliseum; Los Angeles, CA	W 20–14	43,489	
October 12	Nebraska	No. 20	Pitt Stadium; Pittsburgh, PA	W 34–0	39,493	
October 19	at No. 19 Army	No. 16	Michie Stadium; West Point, NY	L 13–29	27,550	
October 26	at No. 7 Notre Dame		Notre Dame Stadium; Notre Dame, IN (rivalry)	L 7–13	58,775	
November 2	Syracuse		Pitt Stadium; Pittsburgh, PA (rivalry)	L 21–24	35,430	
November 9	West Virginia		Pitt Stadium; Pittsburgh, PA (rivalry)	L 6–7	48,475	
November 23	Penn State		Pitt Stadium; Pittsburgh, PA (rivalry)	W 14–13	44,710	
December 7	at Miami (FL)		Burdine Stadium; Miami, FL	L 13–28	28,231	
Rankings from AP Poll released prior to the game

== Preseason ==
After leading the Pitt Panthers to back-to-back bowl games, Coach Michelosen lost 15 of 25 lettermen to graduation, 8 of whom were starters. On March 19, 60 candidates were invited to spring drills to restock the roster. The NCAA granted 20 practice days in a 32 day period. The Panthers trained on Ellsworth Field. Tackle Jim McCusker and center Charles Brueckman were voted co-captains by their teammates for the 1957 season.

On September 2, forty-nine prospects showed up for three weeks of fall practice to prepare for their opening game against the Oklahoma Sooners. Practice on Ellsworth Field was twice daily (9:30 a.m. and 3:30 p.m.). The squad ate at Ellsworth Center and slept in the Graduate House on Dithridge Street. Recent grads, Bob Pollack and Darrell Lewis were added to the coaching staff on a part-time basis. They assisted Steve Petro when the freshman squad arrived in mid-September. Freshmen recruits of note included highly touted running back Jim Cunningham, along with quarterback Ed Sharockman and end Mike Ditka. Pitt was ranked #8 in the AP preseason poll.

== Game summaries ==
=== Oklahoma ===
Week 1: Oklahoma at Pitt

Team	1	2	3	4	Total
• Oklahoma	0	7	19	0	26
Pitt	0	0	0	0	0

- Date: September 21, 1957
- Location: Pitt Stadium
  Pittsburgh, PA
- Game start: 1:30 p.m.
- Game attendance: 58,942
- Game weather: sunny and humid
- Referee: Mike Olberhalman (Kansas State)

Scoring summary
2	OKLA	Joe Rector 12-yard pass from Jakie Sandefer (Carl Dodd kick)	OKLA 7–0
3	OKLA	Clendon Thomas13-yard run ( Dodd kick)	OKLA 14–0
3	OKLA	Don Stiller 17-yard pass from Dodd ( kick missed)	OKLA 20–0
3	OKLA	Dick Carpenter 26-yard pass from David Baker ( kick missed)	OKLA 26–0

On September 21, the Panthers opened their season against the #1 ranked Oklahoma Sooners. In the second week of the 1953 season, the Sooners and Panthers played to a 7–7 tie. The Sooners then proceeded to win 40 games in a row. Coach Bud Wilkinson's squad had 25 returning lettermen and 3 consensus All-Americans – guard Bill Krisher, halfback Clendon Thomas and center Bob Harrison.

Pitt, with 10 returning lettermen, was a touchdown underdog and had never beaten the Sooners (0–2–1). After their final workout on Friday, the Panthers bussed to the Penn-Lincoln Hotel in Wilkinsburg until game time. A crowd approaching 60,000 was expected.

Oklahoma ran its winning streak to 41 games with a convincing 26–0 victory in front of 58,942 fans. In the first quarter, the Pitt defense twice stopped Oklahoma drives deep inside their territory. They held on downs at the 19-yard line and then Bill Kaliden intercepted a Dick Carpenter pass on the Pitt 9-yard line. Early in the second period the Sooners gained possession on their 49-yard line. A 5-play drive ended with a 12-yard touchdown pass from Jake Sandefer to Joe Rector. Carl Dodd added the extra point and Oklahoma led at halftime 7–0. In the first five minutes of the third quarter, Pitt fumbled twice. First, Bill Kaliden turned it over on the 20-yard line. On the third play, Clendon Thomas scored on a 13-yard reverse. Dodd added the point for a 14–0 lead. Next, Dick Haley fumbled on the 33-yard line. The Sooners scored in 5 plays on a 17-yard pass from Dodd to Don Stiller. After Dodd missed the placement, Oklahoma led 20–0. The Sooners substitutes padded the score with a 28-yard touchdown pass from David Baker to Dick Carpenter late in the quarter. Dave Rolle missed the extra point.

Pitt earned 9 first downs and gained a total of 173 yards. They lost 3 of 6 fumbles and had 2 passes intercepted. Oklahoma earned 20 first downs and gained 388 total yards. Pitt fullback Bob Stark led the Pitt rushers with 35 yards on 7 carries. Clendon Thomas led the Sooners with 86 yards on 12 carries.

The Pitt starting lineup for the game against Oklahoma was Dick Scherer (left end), Ron Kissel (left tackle), John Guzik (left guard), Charles Brueckman (center), Dan Wisniewski (right guard), Jim McCusker (right tackle), Jim Zanos (right end), Bill Kaliden (quarterback), Dick Haley (left halfback), Jim Theodore (right halfback) and Dick Bowen (fullback). Substitutes appearing in the game for Pitt were Bob Rathi, Art Gob, Tom Romanik, Ed Humeston, Ed Michaels, Norton Seaman, Dick Carr, Henry Suffoletta, Don Crafton, Jim Lenhart, John Flara, Joe Scisly, Andy Sepsi and Bob Stark.

=== at Oregon ===
Week 2: Pitt at Oregon

Team	1	2	3	4	Total
• Pitt	0	0	0	6	6
Oregon	0	0	3	0	3

- Date: September 28, 1957
- Location: Multnomah Stadium
  Portland, OR
- Game start: 8:00 p.m.
- Game attendance: 20,486
- Game weather: clear
- Referee: Jack Sprenger

Scoring summary
3	ORE	Jack Morris 13-yard field goal	ORE 3–0
4	PITT	Art Gob 22-yard touchdown pass from Ivan Toncic ( kick missed)	PITT 6–3

On September 26, thirty-seven varsity members, coaches and staff took an 11-hour flight to Portland, Oregon, in order to play the Oregon Ducks at Multnomah Stadium. Since the Panthers were also scheduled to play at USC on the following Friday, nine university professors made the trip: Robert Laing (English); Dr. James A. Kehl (History); Dr. P. B. Kohlberger (Business Administration); Dr. John Knipp (Mathematics); D. H. McDaniel (Chemistry); Stephen Olah (Biology); and Vincent Lopardo (Mechanical Engineering). The Panthers played Oregon in Portland on Saturday. On Sunday the entourage went fishing in Cape Disappointment. They then bussed to the University of Oregon in Eugene. On Monday through Wednesday, the squad was lectured to in the mornings and had football practice in the afternoons. Thursday they traveled to Los Angeles.

Ex-Pitt Coach Len Casanova was in his seventh year at Oregon. His Ducks were 1–0 for the season, having beaten Idaho in their opening game (9–6). This was the second meeting of these teams. Pitt won the 1956 contest 14–7.

With under 30 seconds to play, the Pitt Panthers eked out a 6–3 victory with an Ivan Toncic 21-yard touchdown pass to end Art Gob. The Panthers spent the first quarter in Oregon territory but could not score. Oregon only ran seven plays. In the second period, Oregon gained possession on their own 18-yard line. Five plays moved the ball to the Pitt 43-yard line. Then, Leroy Phelps threw a touchdown pass to Jim Shanley, but it was called back for off-sides. The Ducks got on the scoreboard in the third quarter with a 13-yard field goal by Jack Morris. Shanley had run the kick-off back 55-yards to the Panthers 45-yard line. 10 plays advanced the ball to the Pitt 5-yard line, where the Pitt defense stiffened and forced the field goal. Then, the Ducks advanced the ball to the Panthers 6-yard line, but decided not to kick a field goal, and lost the ball on downs. Late in the final quarter Pitt back, Dick Haley, returned a punt to the Oregon 49-yard line. Six plays moved the ball to the 26-yard line. Quarterback Bill Kaliden was injured and replaced by Ivan Toncic. On first down, Haley ran around left end for a 5-yard gain. On second down, Toncic threw the touchdown pass to Gob. Norton Seamen missed the extra point.

The Pitt starting line-up for the game against Oregon was Dick Scherer (left end), Ron Kissel (left tackle), John Guzik (left guard), Charles Brueckman (center), Dan Wisniewski (right guard), Jim McCuster (right tackle), Jim Zanos (right end), Bill Kaliden (quarterback), John Flara (left halfback), Jim Theodore (right halfback) and Bob Stark (fullback). Substitutes appearing in the game for Pitt were Bob Rathi, Ed Michaels, Norton Seaman, Dick Carr, Bill Lindner, Art Gob, Ivan Toncic, Dick Haley, Joe Scisly, Andy Sepsi, Fred Riddle and Curt Plowman.

=== at USC ===
Week 3: Pitt at USC

Team	1	2	3	4	Total
• Pitt	7	6	7	0	20
USC	0	7	7	0	14

- Date: October 4, 1957
- Location: Los Angeles Memorial Coliseum
  Los Angeles, CA
- Game start: 8:15 p.m.
- Game attendance: 43,489
- Game weather: cloudy
- Referee: Ed Wagner

Scoring summary
1	PITT	Bill Kaliden 1-yard sneak (Ivan Toncic kick)	PITT 7–0
2	PITT	Art Gob recovered blocked punt in end zone ( kick blocked)	PITT 13–0
2	USC	Rex Johnston 10-yard run (Ed Isherwood kick)	PITT 13–7
3	PITT	Ivan Toncic 1-yard run ( Toncic kick)	PITT 20–7
3	USC	Don Voyne 30-yard pass from Willie Wood (Isherwood kick)	PITT 20–14

The Panthers United Airlines flight from Oregon arrived in Los Angeles early Thursday afternoon. They headquartered at the Ambassador Hotel and practiced at the Coliseum in the evening. Coach Don Clark's Trojans led the series 3–2. USC was 0–2 for the season, having lost to Oregon State (20–0) and Michigan (16–6).

Pitt coach John Michelosen told the Los Angeles Times: “We looked much better Saturday night than we did the week before, and I am sure we'll show additional improvement against Southern Cal. Our boys are a hardworking group and the win over Oregon gave them the lift they needed.” End Art Gob was voted Lineman of the Week by the Associated Press.

On Friday night, in front of 43,489 fans, the Panthers completed their two-game road trip with a 20–14 victory over the Trojans. The Panthers scored first. They started their second possession on the USC 42-yard line and advanced the ball to the 1-yard line in seven plays. Bill Kalidan's quarterback sneak put Pitt on the scoreboard first, for the first time since the 1955 West Virginia game. Ivan Toncic's placement made it 7–0. In the second quarter, lineman of the week Art Gob blocked a punt and fell on it in the end zone to extend Pitt's lead to 13–0. Toncic's extra point was blocked. Then Toncic fumbled and USC recovered on the Panthers 14-yard line. On third down Rex Johnston ran 10 yards around right end for the touchdown. Ed Isherwood added the placement. Pitt led 13–7 at halftime. At the start of the third period, Dick Haley intercepted a USC pass and returned it to the 12-yard line. The referees detected clipping on the play, so Pitt started from the USC 27-yard line. The Panthers moved the ball to the 9-yard line and Haley ran around right end for a score. But it was called back for holding. The Panthers scored on the third play from the 19-yard line, a 1-yard sneak by Toncic. Toncic made the extra point and Pitt was ahead 20–7. The Trojans began passing on every down. Substitute quarterback Willie Wood connected with Don Voyne for a 30-yard touchdown pass. Isherwood converted the extra point and Pitt hung on for the victory.

The referees penalized the Panthers 8 times for 142 yards and USC 11 times for 112 yards. In the third quarter, the referee ejected USC quarterback Jim Conroy, USC center Ken Antle and Pitt end Jim Zanos for fighting. The Panthers gained 309 total yards and held USC to 142. Pitt had 19 first downs to 9 for the Trojans. Third-string running back Fred Riddle led the Panthers with 110 yards rushing on 17 carries for an average per carry of 6.48.

The Pitt starting line-up for the game against USC was Dick Scherer (left end), Ron Kissel (left tackle), John Guzik (left guard), Charles Brueckman (center), Dan Wisniewski (right guard), Jim McCusker (right tackle), Jim Zanos (right end), Bill Kaliden (quarterback), Dick Haley (left halfback), Joe Scisly (right halfback) and Fred Riddle (fullback). Substitutes appearing in the game for Pitt were Bob Rathi, Ernie Westwood, Ed Michaels, Don Crafton, Dick Carr, Bill Lindner, Art Gob, Joe Pullekines, Peter Prince, Ivan Toncic, Jim Lenhart, John Flara, Jim Theodore and Bob Stark.

=== Nebraska ===
Week 4: Nebraska at Pitt

Team	1	2	3	4	Total
Nebraska	0	0	0	0	0
• Pitt	14	7	0	13	34

- Date: October 12, 1957
- Location: Pitt Stadium
  Pittsburgh, PA
- Game start: 1:30 p.m.
- Game attendance: 40,023
- Game weather: sunny
- Referee: Francis P. Brennan (Canisius)

Scoring summary
1	PITT	Joe Scisly 1-yard run (Ivan Toncic kick)	PITT 7–0
1	PITT	Dick Scherer12-yard run with blocked punt (Toncic kick)	PITT 14–0
2	PITT	Art Gob 10-yard pass from Jim Lenhart ( Toncic kick)	PITT 21–0
4	PITT	Fred Riddle 1-yard run ( kick missed)	PITT 27–0
4	PITT	Joe Scisly 30-yard run (Dick Haley kick)	PITT 34–0

October 12 was the annual Band and Boy Scout Day at the Stadium, and the Panthers played their only home game for the month against the Nebraska Cornhuskers. First-year coach Bill Jennings' squad was 1–2 for the season. The Huskers traveling roster was minus three regulars and three second-stringers due to the flu and injuries: Bennie Dillard – starting halfback (flu); Mike Lee – starting end (rib injury); Jerry Wheeler – starting tackle (flu); Marlin Hilding – reserve end (flu); Jim Moore – reserve end (flu) and Bill Tuning – reserve end (ankle). Harry Tolly, regular quarterback, made the trip but did not play due to an injured knee.

Pitt led the all-time series 14–3–3. Coach Michelosen also had an injured list. Halfback Andy Sepsi and fullback Dick Bowen did not play. Ivan Toncic, hero of the Oregon victory, started at quarterback for the injured Bill Kaliden. Pitt was an 18-point favorite.

Pitt extended their winning streak to three with a 34–0 romp over Nebraska. Pitt took the opening kick-off and drove 71 yards in 8 plays. Joe Sciley scored from the 1-yard line. Ivan Toncic kicked the extra point. After receiving the kick-off, Nebraska tried to quick kick on third down. Pitt guard Dick Carr blocked it and Dick Scherer ran it in for the second touchdown in the first 4 minutes. Toncic added the placement. In the second period Jim Lenhart recovered a Nebraska fumble on the Husker 33-yard line. It took the Panthers 8 plays to score on a 10-yard touchdown pass from Lenhart to Art Gob. Toncic's extra point made the halftime score 21–0. The third period was scoreless. The Panthers added two more touchdowns in the final quarter on a 1-yard run by Fred Riddle and a 30-yard run by Joe Scisly. Dick Haley made one of two extra points to cap the scoring.

Pitt had 28 first downs and gained 414 total yards. They held Nebraska to 4 first downs and 76 total yards. Their only miscues were losing 3 of 6 fumbles and being penalized 6 times for 90 yards. Joe Scisley led the Panthers with 109 rushing yards on 13 carries, and Fred Riddle had 84 yards on 13 carries.

The Pitt starting line-up for the game against Nebraska was Dick Scherer (left end), Ron Kissel (left tackle), John Guzik (left guard), Charles Brueckman (center), Dan Wisniewski (right guard), Jim McCusker (right tackle), Jim Zanos (right end), Ivan Toncic (quarterback), Dick Haley (left halfback), Joe Scisly (right halfback) and Fred Riddle (fullback). Substitutes appearing in the game for Pitt were Bob Rathi, Gordon Oliver, Ernie Westwood, Ed Michaels, Norton Seaman, Ken Montanari, Don Crafton, Serafino Fazio, Henry Suffoletta, Bob Longfellow, Bill Lindner, Ed Humeston, Art Gob, Joe Pullikines, Jim Lenhart, John Flara, Curt Plowman and Bob Stark.

=== at Army ===
Week 5: Pitt at Army

Team	1	2	3	4	Total
Pitt	0	6	0	7	13
• Army	6	0	7	16	29

- Date: October 19, 1957
- Location: Michie Stadium
  West Point, NY
- Game start: 2:00 p.m.
- Game attendance: 27,550
- Game weather: clear and cool
- Referee: Albert J. Booth (Yale)

Scoring summary
1	ARMY	Bob Anderson 1-yard run (kick missed)	ARMY 6–0
2	PITT	Dick Scherer 37-yard pass from Ivan Toncic (kick missed)	TIED 6–6
3	ARMY	Harry Walters 2-yard run ( Walters kick)	ARMY 13–6
4	ARMY	Pete Dawkins 32-yard pass from Dave Bourland (Walters kick)	ARMY 20–6
4	ARMY	Maurice Hilliard 20-yard field goal	ARMY 23–6
4	PITT	Dick Haley 53-yard pass from Toncic ( Toncic kick)	ARMY 23–13
4	ARMY	Bob Anderson 1-yard run (kick missed)	ARMY 29–13

For the fifth game of the season, the #16 Panthers were back on the road to West Point, NY to play the #19 Army Cadets. Pitt led the all-time series 5–1. Earl Blaik's Cadets were 2–1 for the season. Their only loss was by two points to Notre Dame the previous week. Army was led by All-American halfback Bob Anderson.

On Friday morning the Panthers flew into Stewart Field at West Point, and headquartered at the Bear Mountain Inn. Coach Michelosen held practice in Michie Stadium at 2:30. The Pennsylvania Railroad ran five special trains from Pittsburgh to West Point for the game. Michie Stadium was sold out. Michelosen inserted Bill Kaliden at quarterback and kept the remaining starting line-up intact.

After holding Army to a 6–6 tie at the end of the first half, the Panthers defense gave up 23 points in the second half and lost 29–13. Army scored early in the opening period. Pitt fumbled a punt and Army recovered on the Panthers 17-yard line. Three plays later Bob Anderson scored on a 1-yard run. Maurice Hilliard missed the point after. Pitt tied the score late in the second quarter. It was fourth down and four to go on the Army 37-yard line. Ivan Toncic threw a touchdown pass to Dick Scherer, but Toncic missed the extra point. The Cadets drove 83 yards in 17 plays to start the third quarter. Harry Walters scored on a 2-yard run and he booted the extra point. The Panthers decided to pass more, but the Cadets intercepted on their own 46-yard line. They scored in 6 plays on a Dave Bourland 32-yard pass to Pete Dawkins. Walters added the point after. Their next interception led to a Hilliard 20-yard field goal. The Pitt offense finally answered with a 53-yard scoring pass from Toncic to Dick Haley. Toncic's placement cut the margin to 23–13. Army closed the scoring, after another interception, on a 1-yard run by Anderson.

Army had 20 first downs and gained 328 total yards. Pitt countered with 11 first downs and 241 total yards. Bob Anderson gained 96 yards on 20 carries and Pete Dawkins had 88 yards on 10 carries for the Cadets. Joe Scisly led Pitt with 49 yards on 12 carries. Ivan Toncic completed 5 of 8 passes for 128 yards and 2 touchdowns.

The Pitt starting line-up for the game against Army was Dick Scherer (left end), Ron Kissel (left tackle), John Guzik (left guard), Charles Brueckman (center), Dan Wisniewski (right guard), Jim McCusker (right tackle), Jim Zanos (right end), Bill Kaliden (quarterback), Dick Haley (left halfback), Joe Scisly (right halfback) and Fred Riddle (fullback). Substitutes appearing in the game for Pitt were Bob Rathi, Paul Stolitza, Ernie Westwood, Ed Michaels, Don Crafton, Bob Longfellow, Bill Lindner, Art Gob, Ivan Toncic, Dick Bowen, Jim Theodore and Bob Stark.

=== at Notre Dame ===
Week 6: Pitt at Notre Dame

Team	1	2	3	4	Total
Pitt	0	7	0	0	7
• Notre Dame	6	0	0	7	13

- Date: October 26, 1957
- Location: Notre Dame Stadium
  Notre Dame, IN
- Game start: 1:30 p.m.
- Game attendance: 58,775
- Game weather: partly cloudy, cold
- Referee: Ross Dean

Scoring summary
2	ND	Reynolds 1-yard run (kick blocked)	ND 6–0
3	PITT	Bil Kaliden 1-yard sneak (Toncic kick)	PITT 7–6
4	ND	Aubrey Lewis 74-yard pass from George Izo (Monte Stickles kick)	ND 13–7

On October 26, the Panthers traveled to South Bend, Indiana to play the Notre Dame Fighting Irish for the twenty-fourth time. The Irish led the all-time series 15–7–1 Coach Terry Brennan's team was undefeated (3–0) and ranked #7. Notre Dame was led by All-American candidates guard Al Ecuyer and fullback Nick Pietrosante. Starting tackle Frank Geremia had the flu and did not play.

Pitt arrived on Friday morning and worked out at the stadium in the afternoon. The squad was housed in Elkhart. Coach Michelosen tweaked the line-up. Starting tackle Ron Kissel did not make the trip due to a lower back injury. Ernie Westwood replaced him. Dick Bowen replaced Dick Haley at left halfback, and Joe Stark replaced Fred Riddle at fullback.

In front of 58,775 fans, after leading for three quarters, the Pitt defense gave up a touchdown pass in the final period and lost the game 13–7. Notre Dame scored in the first quarter. Irish defensive back, Frank Reynolds intercepted an Ivan Toncic pass on the Notre Dame 48-yard line. Notre Dame fumbled twice on the drive, but Gary Myers recovered both times for the Irish. Reynolds capped the drive with a 1-yard sneak. Pitt guard Dan Wisnewski blocked the extra point. The Panthers went ahead in the second quarter on a 56-yard, 12-play drive. Quarterback Bill Kaliden snuck in from the 1-yard line, and Toncic booted the extra point for the Pitt lead. On the first play of the final quarter, third-string quarterback George Izo threw a 74-yard pass to a speedy Aubrey Lewis for what turned out to be the winning touchdown. Monte Stickles kicked the extra point.

Statistically, the teams were even. Pitt had 16 first downs and 256 total yards. Notre Dame had 14 first downs and 289 total yards. Pitt back Joe Scisly gained 97 yards on 17 carries, and Nick Pietrosante led the Irish backs with 79 yards on 16 carries. Irish quarterback Bob Williams, halfback Dick Lynch, and Pitt end Dick Scherer were ejected for fighting.

The Pitt starting line-up for the game against Notre Dame was Dick Scherer (left end), Ernie Westwood (left tackle), Ed Michaels (left guard), Charles Brueckman (center), Dan Wisniewski (right guard), Jim McCusker (right tackle), Jim Zanos (right end), Ivan Toncic (quarterback), Dick Bowen (left halfback), Joe Scisly (right halfback) and Bob Stark (fullback). Substitutes appearing in the game for Pitt were Bob Rathi, Joe Pullekines, Ken Montanari, John Guzik, Don Crafton, Dick Carr, Ed Humeston, Art Gob, Bill Kaliden, Dick Haley, Jim Theodore and Fred Riddle.

=== Syracuse ===
Week 7: Syracuse at Pitt

Team	1	2	3	4	Total
• Syracuse	7	7	7	3	24
Pitt	14	0	0	7	21

- Date: November 2, 1957
- Location: Pitt Stadium
  Pittsburgh, PA
- Game start: 1:30 p.m.
- Game attendance: 35,430
- Game weather: sunny and mild
- Referee: Albert P. Wildman (Grove City)

Scoring summary
1	PITT	Dick Haley 64-yard run (Ivan Toncic kick)	PITT 7–0
1	SYR	Tom Stephens 2-yard run (Al Gerlick kick)	TIED 7–7
1	PITT	Dick Scherer 64-yard pass from Toncic ( Toncic kick)	PITT 14–7
2	SYR	Tom Stephens 1-yard run (Gerlick kick)	TIED 14–14
3	SYR	Chuck Zimmerman 1-yard runl	SYR 21–14
4	PITT	Bill Kaliden 12-yard run ( Toncic kick)	TIED 21–21
4	SYR	Al Gerlick 12-yard field goal	SYR 24–21

The Syracuse Orange, led by ninth-year coach Ben Schwartzwalder, were the Homecoming and Tenth Annual High School Day opponent for the Panthers. Pitt led the series 8–2–2. Syracuse's record was 3–1–1. The Syracuse travel squad was too heavy for their chartered plane, so 6 players had to fly commercially. Everyone arrived safely and in time for the game. Syracuse was a 10 point underdog.

On November 1, at the Pitt Lettermen's Club Dinner, Coach Michelosen was given a three-year extension to his contract. His record to date was 17–10–1. Michelosen made five changes to the starting line-up for the Syracuse game: Bill Kaliden was at quarterback, Dick Haley at halfback, Fred Riddle at fullback, Joe Pullekines at end and Fred Montanari at tackle.

Syracuse gained revenge for their only 1956 loss with a 24–21 upset of the Panthers. Pitt scored twice in the first quarter. The first touchdown came on a 64-yard run around right end by Dick Haley. Ivan Toncic made the first of his three extra points to put Pitt ahead 7–0. Pitt's kick-off was short and Syracuse drove 62-yards in 12 plays to tie the game. Tom Stephens ran 2-yards over right tackle for the score and Al Gerlick made the first of his three extra points. Pitt answered with a 64-yard touchdown pass from Toncic to Dick Scherer. Syracuse tied the score in the second quarter after recovering a Pitt fumble on the Panthers 33-yard line. Stephens caught a pass for a 16-yard gain and then ran the ball three straight plays for the score. Before halftime Pitt drove to the Syracuse 10-yard line, but lost the ball on downs. Syracuse went ahead in the third quarter. Pitt center Charles Breuckman dislocated his shoulder and was replaced by Don Crafton. Pitt lined up to punt and Crafton centered the ball over Toncic's head. Syracuse gained possession on the Panthers 29-yard line. Syracuse quarterback Chuck Zimmerman scored on a 1-yard sneak. Pitt answered with a drive to the Orange 14-yard line, but fumbled. In the final period the Panthers engineered a 64-yard scoring drive to tie the score on Bill Kaliden's 12-yard run. Then Pitt recovered a Stephens fumble on the Orange 35-yard line. Four plays later they were still on the 35-yard line. Syracuse then drove to the Pitt 5-yard line. Pitt held but on fourth down Gerlick booted a 12-yard field goal with less than three minutes left in the game. On first down, following the kick-off, Gerlick sacked Kaliden for a 14 yard loss. Syracuse won their first game at Pitt Stadium.

Three Panthers were injured in the game: center Charles Brueckman dislocated his shoulder, guard Ed Michaels fractured his ribs and halfback Joe Scisly sprained his ankle. Al Gerlick's field goal was the first field goal attempted during Schwartzwalder's tenure.

Statistically, Pitt had 16 first downs and gained 356 total yards. Syracuse had 17 first downs and 311 total yards. Dick Haley led the Pitt rushers with 64 yards on 5 carries, with Fred Riddle a close second with 63 yards on 8 carries. Tom Stephens led Syracuse with 66 yards on 18 carries.

The Pitt starting line-up for the game against Syracuse was Dick Scherer (left end), Ken Montanari (left tackle), Ed Michaels (left guard), Charles Brueckman (center), Dan Wisniewski (right guard), Jim McCusker (right tackle), Joe Pullekines (right end), Bill Kaliden (quarterback), Dick Haley (left halfback), Joe Scisly (right halfback) and Fred Riddle (fullback). Substitutes appearing in the game for Pitt were Bob Rathi, Ron Kissel, Norton Seaman, John Guzik, Don Crafton, Dick Carr, Art Gob, Jim Zanos, Ivan Toncic, Dick Bowen, John Flara, Jim Theodore, Curt Plowman and Bob Stark.

=== West Virginia ===
Week 8: West Virginia at Pitt

Team	1	2	3	4	Total
• West Virginia	7	0	0	0	7
Pitt	0	0	6	0	6

- Date: November 9, 1957
- Location: Pitt Stadium
  Pittsburgh, PA
- Game start: 1:30 p.m.
- Game attendance: 48,745
- Game weather: cold, windy, snowy
- Referee: W. H. Averette Jr. (N.C. State)

Scoring summary
1	WVA	Larry Krutko 3-yard run (Whitey Mikanik kick)	WVA 7–0
4	PITT	Art Gob 51-yard touchdown pass from Ivan Toncic ( kick missed)	WVA 7–6

On November 9, the Panthers and West Virginia met for the fiftieth time. Pitt led the series 37–11–1, and had won the past 3 in a row. Coach Art Lewis' Mountaineers were 4–2–1. Guard Chuck Howley suffered a fractured cheekbone in practice and did not play.

Coach Michelosen's squad was decimated by injuries: center Charles Brueckman (dislocated shoulder), halfback Joe Scisly (bruised hip and ankle), guard Ed Michaels (bruised ribs), halfback Dick Haley (knee), halfback Dick Bowen (knee), and tackle Jim McCusker (wrist fracture). Oddly, the Panthers with their 3-4 record and numerous injuries were a six point favorite.

In front of 48,745 shivering fans, West Virginia ran Pitt's losing streak to four games with a 7–6 victory. West Virginia scored in the first quarter. Halfback Bill McClure returned a punt 44-yards to the Pitt 6-yard line. On third down Larry Krutko scored on a dive over left tackle. Ex-Pitt halfback Whitey Mikanik kicked the extra point, and WVU led 7–0. In the second quarter the Panthers drove 62-yards, only to have Bill Kaliden's quarterback sneak stopped inches short of the goal line by the Mountaineers defense. In the third period, the Panthers gained possession on their own 45-yard line. On third down Ivan Toncic threw a 51-yard touchdown pass to Art Gob. Toncic's placement was wide left. With two minutes remaining in the game, Pitt had the ball on the WVU 42-yard line. Mountaineers end Terry Fairbanks sacked Toncic on three straight plays.

Statistically Pitt earned 11 first downs and gained 192 total yards. Bob Stark led the Panthers with 61 yards rushing on 15 carries. Jim Theodore added 57 yards on 13 carries. Ivan Toncic completed 5 of 10 passes for 87 yards and one touchdown. WVU had 12 first downs and 222 total yards. Larry Krutko gained 67 yards on 18 carries.

The Pitt starting line-up for the game against West Virginia was Joe Pullekines (left end), Ken Montanari (left tackle), John Guzik (left guard), Don Crafton (center), Dick Carr (right guard), Bill Lindner (right tackle), Jim Zanos (right end), Ivan Toncic (quarterback), Dick Bowen (left halfback), Jim Theodore (right halfback) and Bob Stark (fullback). Substitutes appearing in the game for Pitt were Dick Scherer, Ron Kissel, Norton Seaman, Serafino Fazio, Dan Wisniewski, Ed Humeston, Art Gob, Bill Kaliden, Dick Haley, John Flara, Curt Plowman and Fred Riddle.

=== Penn State ===
Week 9: Penn State at Pitt

Team	1	2	3	4	Total
Penn State	0	7	6	0	13
• Pitt	0	0	0	14	14

- Date: November 23, 1957
- Location: Pitt Stadium
  Pittsburgh, PA
- Game start: 1:30 p.m.
- Game attendance: 44,710
- Game weather: sunny and cool
- Referee: David H. Buchanan (Temple)

Scoring summary
2	PSU	Ron Markiewicz 1-yard pass from Eddie Caye(Emil Caprara kick)	PSU 7–0
3	PSU	Paul North 19-yard pass from Al Jacks ( kick missed)	PSU 13–0
4	PITT	Fred Riddle 2-yard run (Ivan Toncic kick)	PSU 13–7
4	PITT	Dick Scherer 45-yard pass from Bill Kaliden (Norton Seaman kick)	PITT 14–13

On November 23, the Panthers and Penn State played for the fifty-seventh time. Pitt led the series 31–22–3. Eighth-year coach Rip Engle's Lions were 6–2 for the season. Their only losses were to Army (13–27) and Vanderbilt (20–32).

After a bye week, Coach Michelosen hoped to get some of his injured players back into the line-up. Jim McCusker (tackle), Ron Kissel (tackle), Dick Scherer (end) and Dick Haley (left halfback) were cleared to play by trainer Howard Waite. Ten Panthers played their final home game: Jim McCusker, Ed Humeston, Dan Wisniewski, Ron Kissel, Dick Scherer, Gordon Oliver, Charles Breuckman, Dick Carr, Jin Lenhart and Jim Theodore.

On a beautiful day for football, the Panthers came from behind in the final quarter to end their losing streak with a 14–13 victory. Penn State controlled the first three quarters. State quarterback Richie Lucas's punting kept Pitt deep in their own territory. In the second period, State gained possession on their own 42-yard line. A 43-yard pass completion from Al Jacks to Marty Schleicher moved the ball to the Pitt 15-yard line. Then it was first down on the five. On fourth and one, Eddie Caye ran left and was about to be tackled for no gain, when he pivoted and threw a pass to Ron Markiewicz for the touchdown. Emil Caprara kicked the extra point. State led 7–0 at halftime. The Lions added a second touchdown late in the third period. Pitt was penalized for roughing on a fair catch by Caye, which moved the ball to the Panthers 36-yard line. The Lions needed seven plays to score. A 9-yard touchdown pass from Jacks to Paul North gave State a 13–0 lead. Caprara missed the placement. Early in the fourth quarter, the Pitt offense engineered a 74-yard, 11-play drive that ended with a touchdown. Fred Riddle ran through left tackle from the 3-yard line and Ivan Toncic made the extra point. The Panthers regained possession on their 31-yard line. Bill Kaliden led a 5-play drive that ended with him throwing a 45-yard touchdown pass to Dick Scherer to tie the score. Since Kaliden replaced Toncic in the line-up, Toncic was unable to return to the game to kick the extra point. Coach Michelosen sent sophomore guard Norton Seaman (from Calcutta, India, who had a tightly strapped shoulder separation) into the game. His kick was perfect, but Pitt was called for illegal procedure and backed up five yards. Seaman was good on the second try, and Pitt had their fourth win of the season.

Statistically, Pitt had 16 first downs and 327 total yards (203 on the ground). Penn State had 14 first downs and 268 total yards (197 through the air). Fred Riddle led the Pitt rushers with 75 yards on 17 carries. Bill Kaliden completed 6 of 14 passes for 116 yards and 1 touchdown.

The Pitt starting line-up for the game against Penn State was Joe Pullekines (left end), Ron Kissel (left tackle), John Guzik (left guard), Don Crafton (center), Dick Carr (right guard), Jim McCusker (right tackle), Art Gob (right end), Ivan Toncic (quarterback), Dick Haley (left halfback), Jim Theodore (right halfback) and Bob Stark (fullback). Substitutes appearing in the game for Pitt were Dick Scherer, Bob Rathi, Gordon Oliver, Ken Montanari, Ernie Westwood, Ed Michaels, Norton Seaman, Serafino Fazio, Dan Wisniewski, Ed Humeston, Jim Zanos, Bill Kaliden, Jim Lenhart, Andy Sepsi, John Flara, Curt Plowman and Fred Riddle.

=== at Miami (FL) ===
Week 10: Pitt at Miami

Team	1	2	3	4	Total
Pitt	0	0	6	7	13
• Miami	0	14	14	0	28

- Date: December 7, 1957
- Location: Burdine Stadium
  Miami, FL
- Game start: 4:00 p.m.
- Game attendance: 28,231
- Game weather: warm and clear
- Referee: Albert Booth Jr. (Yale)

Scoring summary
2	MIAMI	Joe Plevel 12-yard pass from Fran Curci (Bonnie Yarbrough kick)	MIAMI 7–0
2	MIAMI	Byron Blasko 1-yard run ( Curci end run from the 7-yard line )	MIAMI 14–0
3	PITT	Dick Scherer 35-yard pass from Bill Kaliden (kick blocked)	MIAMI 14–6
3	MIAMI	Plevel 9-yard pass from Curci (Yarbrough kick)	MIAMI 21–6
3	MIAMI	Terry Stewart 53-yard run (Alfred Dangel kick)	MIAMI 28–6
4	PITT	Jim Theodore 4-yard run (Ivan Toncic kick)	MIAMI 28–13

For the second season in a row, the Panthers final game was a road trip to Miami, FL to play Coach Andy Gustafson's Hurricanes. After practicing indoors in Pittsburgh, due to snow, the Panthers flew into sunny Miami on Thursday and housed at the Shore Club Hotel. Michelosen led a practice on a local high school field at 4 p.m (same time as kick-off on Saturday). Coach Michelosen told the Miami Herald: “We're in our best shape since the Army game......I expect a heck of a battle.”

The all-time series was tied at 2–2, with Pitt winning both games played in Miami. Miami was 4–4–1 for the season. Miami's top two running backs were out. John Varone had a broken jaw, and Bill Sandie was called home for a family emergency. On September 1, Gustafson told the Miami Herald: “If you quote me, I'll deny it, but I'd rather beat Pittsburgh than any other team on our schedule-even Florida.”

For the second year in a row, the game was the national NBC Game of the Week. Lindsey Nelson handled the play-by-play and Red Grange provided the color. Miami was 0–2 on TV. NBC set the game time to 4 p.m. so it would not interfere with the 1 p.m. CBS telecast of the Pittsburgh Steelers versus New York Giants. To boost attendance, the University of Miami gave all servicemen in uniform, and Dade County high school teachers, band members and football team members free admission.

Miami gained revenge for the previous season's loss to the Panthers with a decisive 28–13 victory. On the first play from scrimmage, Miami quarterback, Fran Curci (born in Sewickley, PA) ran 44 yards to set the tone. The first quarter was scoreless. In the second quarter, the Panthers fumbled twice in a matter of three minutes and gave up two touchdowns to hand Miami a 14–0 halftime lead. The first fumble was on the Panthers 17-yard line. On the third play, Curci threw a 12-yard touchdown pass to Joe Plevel (from Rochester, PA), and Bennie Yarbrough made the first of his two extra points. Then, on the first play after receiving the kick-off, the Panthers fumbled on their 19-yard line. On fourth down from the 1-yard line Byron Blasko (from Turtle Creek, PA) ran around left end for the score. Curci scored the extra point on an end run. Pitt got on the scoreboard in the third quarter on a 5-play, 56-yard drive, capped by Bill Kaliden's 35-yard touchdown pass to Dick Scherer. Miami's Blasko blocked the extra point. Miami answered with a 14-play, 75-yard drive capped by the second touchdown catch by Plevel from Curci. Yarbrough's placement extended the lead to 21–6. Miami regained possession and halfback Terry Stewart (from Allentown, Pennsylvania) took a handoff and raced 55-yards for the touchdown. Alfred Dangel (from Hollidaysburg, PA) kicked the extra point and Miami led 28–6. Pitt mustered a 7-play, 69-yard drive in the final quarter. Jim Theodore scored on a 4-yard run and Ivan Toncic added the placement.

The Pitt starting line-up for the game against Miami was Dick Scherer(left end), Ron Kissel (left tackle), John Guzik (left guard), Don Crafton (center), Dan Wisniand ewski (right guard), Jim McCusker (right tackle), Jim Zanos (right end), Bill Kaliden (quarterback), Dick Haley (left halfback), Jim Theodore (right halfback) and Fred Riddle (fullback). Substitutes appearing in the game for Pitt were Joe Pullekines, Gordon Oliver, Ken Montanari, Charles Brueckman, Dick Carr, Ed Michaels, Henry Suffoletta, Ed Humeston, Bill Lindner, Art Gob, Ivan Toncic, Andy Sepsi, John Flara, Joe Scisly, Curt Plowman and Bob Stark.

== Postseason ==
Tackle Jim McCusker was named to the 1957 International News Service (INS) All-America second team, the Associated Press third team and the United Press third team.

Center Charles Brueckman was named to the 1957 INS All-America second team and UP third team.

McCusker and Brueckman were picked to play for the East squad in the East-West Shrine Bowl in San Francisco, which was played on December 28.

== Coaching staff ==
1957 Pittsburgh Panthers football staff
Coaching staff: John Michelosen – head coach; Jack Wiley – head line coach; Victor Fusia – backfield coach; Robert Timmons – end coach; Ernie Hefferle – offensive line coach; Steve Petro – freshman coach; Walter Cummins– center coach	Support staff: Thomas J. Hamilton – athletic director; Walter P. Cummins – assistant athletic director; Carroll Cook– athletic publicity director; Frank Carver – graduate manager; Howard Waite – trainer; Roger McGill – assistant trainer; John L. Sullivan – student manager

== Roster ==
1957 Pittsburgh Panthers football roster
Player	Position	Games	Weight	Height	Class	Prep School	Hometown
Ed Bombich	guard	0	215	6 ft	sophomore	South H. S.	Pittsburgh, PA
Dick Bowen*	halfback	5	200	6 ft	senior	Duquesne H. S.	White Oak, PA
Charles Brueckman*	center	8	220	6 ft 2 in	senior	Stowe H. S.	Stowe Twp., PA
Larry Burke	tackle	0	220	6 ft 3 in	sophomore	East Deer H. S.	Creighton, PA
Ray Carion	end	0	210	6 ft 2 in	sophomore	Springdale H. S.	Springdale, PA
Dick Carr*	guard	9	210	6 ft	senior	Stonewall Jackson H. S.	Charleston, WV
Al Corfield	guard	0	185	6 ft	sophomore	Sharpsburg H. S.	Sharpsburg, PA
Jim Cox	halfback	0	175	6 ft	sophomore	Collingdale H. S.	Collingdale, PA
Don Crafton*	guard	9	195	6 ft	senior	Donora H. S.	Donora, PA
Ron Dzadony	tackle	0	215	6 ft	sophomore	Stowe H. S.	Stowe, PA
Serafino Fazio	center	3	215	5 ft 11 in	sophomore	Coraopolis H. S.	Coraopolis, PA
John Flara*	halfback	8	175	5 ft 10 in	junior	Midland H. S.	Midland, PA
Art Gob*	end	10	225	6 ft 4 in	junior	Baldwin H. S.	Baldwin, PA
John Guzik*	guard	10	230	6 ft 3 in	senior	Cecil Twp. H. S.	Cecil Twp., PA
Robert Gwynn	center	0	205	5 ft 11 in	junior	Waynesburg H. S.	Waynesburg, PA
Dick Haley*	halfback	10	190	5 ft 10 in	junior	Midway H. S.	Midway, PA
Dace Helsel	end	0	195	6 ft 1 in	sophomore	Hollidaysburg H. S.	Hollidaysburg, PA
Ed Humeston*	tackle	6	200	6 ft 2 in	senior	Clarksburg H. S.	Clarksburg, WV
Bill Kaliden*	quarterback	9	184	6 ft	junior	Homestead H. S.	Homestead, PA
Ronnie Kissel*	tackle	9	230	6 ft 2 in	senior	McKeesport Technical H. S.	McKeesport, PA
Jim Koller	halfback	0	160	5 ft 9 in	sophomore	Robinson Twp. H. S.	Coraopolis, PA
Jim Lenhart	quarterback	4	195	6 ft 2 in	senior	Charleroi H. S.	Charleroi, PA
Bill Lindner*	tackle	5	205	6 ft 2 in	junior	Central Catholic H.S.	Pittsburgh, PA
Bob Longfellow	guard	2	200	5 ft 11 in	sophomore	Freedom H.S.	Freedom, PA
Charles Marranca	tackle	0	210	5 ft 11in	sophomore	Pittston H. S.	Pittston, PA
Jim McCusker*	tackle	10	245	6 ft 2 in	senior	Jamestown H. S.	Jamestown, NY
Ed Michaels*	guard	9	190	5 ft 11 in	junior	Southside H. S.	Elmira, NY
Ken Montanari*	guard	6	200	6 ft 1 in	junior	Plum H. S.	Plum, PA
Bob Navalance	center	0	185	6 ft	sophomore	Ambridge H. S.	Ambridge, PA
Gordon Oliver	end	3	190	6 ft	senior	Punxsutawney H. S.	Punxsutawney, PA
Curt Plowman*	fullback	6	185	6 ft	sophomore	Altoona H. S.	Altoona, PA
Peter Prince	quarterback	1	185	5 ft 10 in	junior	Nashua H. S.	Nashua, NH
Joe Pullekines*	end	7	197	6 ft 2 in	junior	St. James H. S.	Woodlyn, PA
Bob Rathi*	end	8	195	6 ft 2 in	sophomore	Munhall H. S.	Munhall, PA
Fred Riddle*	fullback	9	190	6 ft	junior	Robinson Twp. H. S.	Crafton, PA
Tom Romanik	tackle	1	225	5 ft 10 in	junior	St. Vincent H. S.	Pittsburgh, PA
James Sabatini	tackle`	0	195	6 ft 1 in	senior	Wilkes-Barre H. S.	Plains, PA
Tom Salwoki	center	0	210	6 ft 2 in	junior	New Britain H. S.	Collinsville, CT
Dick Scherer*	end	10	205	6 ft 1 in	senior	North Catholic H. S.	Pittsburgh, PA
Joe Scisly*	halfback	8	180	6 ft	junior	Danville H. S.	Elysburg, PA
Norton Seaman	guard	7	205	5 ft 10 in	sophomore	Hummelstown H. S.	Hummelstown, PA
Andy Sepsi*	halfback	4	195	5 ft 11 in	sophomore	Brownsville H. S.	Brownsville, PA
Richard Staber	tackle	0	205	6 ft 2 in	junior	West Hazleton H. S.	Conyngham, PA
Bob Stark*	fullback	9	190	5 ft 11 in	sophomore	East McKeesport H. S.	McKeesport, PA
Paul Stolitza	end	1	200	6 ft 2 in	junior	Bethel H. S.	Bethel, PA
Henry Suffoletta	guard	2	215	5 ft 11 in	junior	Midland H. S.	Midland, PA
Jim Theodore*	halfback	9	180	5 ft 10 in	senior	Westinghouse Memorial H. S.	Wilmerding, PA
Ivan Toncic*	quarterback	9	175	5 ft 11 in	sophomore	Midland H. S.	Midland, PA
George Valesky	halfback	0	180	6 ft 1 in	sophomore	Jeannette H. S.	Jeannette, PA
Elmer Villani	quarterback	0	187	5 ft 11 in	junior	Bridgeville H. S.	Bridgeville, PA
Anthony Vuocolo	fullback	0	195	5 ft 11 in	sophomore	Lock Haven H. S.	Lock Haven, PA
Ernie Westwood*	tackle	6	225	6 ft 2 in	sophomore	Clairton H. S.	Clairton, PA
Dan Wisniewski*	guard	8	218	6 ft	senior	Erie East H. S.	Erie, PA
Jim Zanos*	end	10	195	6 ft	junior	Munhall H.S.	Munhall, PA
* Letterman

== Individual scoring summary ==
1957 Pittsburgh Panthers scoring summary
Player	Touchdowns	Extra points	Field goals	Safety	Points
Dick Scherer	5	0	0	0	30
Art Gob	4	0	0	0	24
Ivan Toncic	1	12	0	0	18
Bill Kaliden	3	0	0	0	18
Dick Haley	2	1	0	0	12
Joe Scisly	2	0	0	0	12
Fred Riddle	2	0	0	0	12
Jim Theodore	1	0	0	0	6
Norton Seaman	0	1	0	0	1
Totals	20	14	0	0	134

== Statistical leaders ==
Pittsburgh's individual statistical leaders for the 1957 season include those listed below.

=== Rushing ===
Player	Attempts	Net yards	Yards per attempt	Touchdowns
Fred Riddle	76	407	5.4	2
Bob Stark	90	371	4.1	0
Joe Scisly	67	352	5.3	2
Dick Haley	103	349	3.4	1
Jim Theodore	56	182	3.3	1

=== Passing ===
Player	Attempts	Completions	Interceptions	Comp %	Yards	Yds/Comp	TD
Bill Kaliden	93	40	5	43.0	519	13.0	2
Ivan Toncic	50	24	3	48.0	436	18.2	5
James Lenhart	19	11	4	57.8	80	7.3	1

=== Receiving ===
Player	Receptions	Yards	Yds/Recp	TD
Dick Scherer	20	403	20.2	4
Art Gob	14	216	15.4	3
Joe Zanos	8	106	13.3	0
Dick Haley	7	105	15.0	1

=== Kickoff returns ===
Player	Returns	Yards	Yds/Return	TD
Dick Haley	14	329	23.5	0
Jim Theodore	5	89	17.8	0
Fred Riddle	4	69	17.3	0
Bill Kaliden	4	68	17.0	0

=== Punt returns ===
Player	Returns	Yards	Yds/Return	TD
Dick Haley	7	54	7.7	0
John Flara	6	42	7.0	0
Bill Kaliden	5	40	8.0	0

== Team players drafted into the NFL ==
The following players were selected in the 1957 NFL draft.

Player	Position	Round	Pick	NFL club
Jim McCusker	Tackle	2	14	Chicago Cardinals
John Guzik	Guard	4	41	Los Angeles Rams
Ron Kissel	Tackle	9	105	New York Giants
Dick Scherer	End	30	355	Pittsburgh Steelers
