= 1957 The Citadel Bulldogs football team =

American college football season

1957 The Citadel Bulldogs football
- Conference: Southern Conference
- Record: 5–4–1 (4–2 SoCon)
- Head coach: Eddie Teague (1st season)
- Home stadium: Johnson Hagood Stadium

1957 Southern Conference football standings
	Conf.					Overall
Team	W		L		T	W		L		T
No. 20 VMI $	6	–	0	–	0	9	–	0	–	1
West Virginia	3	–	0	–	0	7	–	2	–	1
The Citadel	4	–	2	–	0	5	–	4	–	1
Furman	2	–	1	–	0	3	–	7	–	0
Richmond	2	–	4	–	0	4	–	6	–	0
William & Mary	2	–	4	–	0	4	–	6	–	0
Davidson	1	–	3	–	0	5	–	3	–	0
VPI	1	–	3	–	0	4	–	5	–	0
George Washington	1	–	5	–	0	2	–	7	–	0
Washington and Lee	0	–	0	–	0	0	–	8	–	0
$ – Conference champion; Rankings from AP Poll

The 1957 The Citadel Bulldogs football team represented The Citadel, The Military College of South Carolina in the 1957 college football season. Eddie Teague served as head coach for the first season. The Bulldogs played as members of the Southern Conference and played home games at Johnson Hagood Stadium.

== Schedule ==
Date	Opponent	Site	Result	Attendance	Source
September 21	Newberry*	Johnson Hagood Stadium; Charleston, SC	T 0–0		
September 27	at George Washington	Griffith Stadium; Washington, DC	W 13–6		
October 5	at Davidson	Richardson Stadium; Davidson, NC	W 21–7		
October 11	vs. Wofford*	County Fairgrounds; Orangeburg, SC (rivalry)	L 0–34		
October 19	Richmond	Johnson Hagood Stadium; Charleston, SC	W 26–0		
October 26	Furman	Johnson Hagood Stadium; Charleston, SC (rivalry)	W 18–14	12,000	
November 2	William & Mary	Johnson Hagood Stadium; Charleston, SC	L 12–14		
November 9	Presbyterian*^{†}	Johnson Hagood Stadium; Charleston, SC	W 14–0		
November 16	vs. No. 13 VMI	City Stadium; Lynchburg, VA (rivalry)	L 7–33	9,000	
November 23	at Vanderbilt*	Dudley Field; Nashville, TN	L 0–27	16,000	
*Non-conference game; ^{†}Homecoming; Rankings from AP Poll released prior to the game
