= 1957 Colorado Buffaloes football team =

American college football season

1957 Colorado Buffaloes football
- Conference: Big Seven Conference
- Record: 6–3–1 (3–3 Big 7)
- Head coach: Dallas Ward (10th season)
- Captain: Game captains
- Home stadium: Folsom Field

1957 Big Seven Conference football standings
	Conf.					Overall
Team	W		L		T	W		L		T
No. 4 Oklahoma $	6	–	0	–	0	10	–	1	–	0
Kansas	4	–	2	–	0	5	–	4	–	1
Missouri	3	–	3	–	0	5	–	4	–	1
Colorado	3	–	3	–	0	6	–	3	–	1
Iowa State	2	–	4	–	0	4	–	5	–	1
Kansas State	2	–	4	–	0	3	–	6	–	1
Nebraska	1	–	5	–	0	1	–	9	–	0
$ – Conference champion; Rankings from AP Poll

The 1957 Colorado Buffaloes football team was an American football team that represented the University of Colorado in the Big Seven Conference during the 1957 college football season. Led by tenth-year head coach Dallas Ward, the Buffaloes compiled an overall record of 6–3–1 with a mark of 3–3 in conference play, tying for third place in the Big 7. The team played its home games on campus at Folsom Field in Boulder, Colorado.

== Schedule ==
Date	Opponent	Rank	Site	TV	Result	Attendance	Source
September 21	at Washington*		Husky Stadium; Seattle, WA		T 6–6	32,500	
September 28	Utah*		Folsom Field; Boulder, CO (rivalry)		W 30–24	37,000	
October 5	Kansas		Folsom Field; Boulder, CO		L 34–35	34,000	
October 12	Arizona*		Folsom Field; Boulder, CO		W 34–14	19,500	
October 19	at Kansas State		Memorial Stadium; Manhattan, KS (rivalry)		W 42–14	14,000	
October 26	at No. 1 Oklahoma		Oklahoma Memorial Stadium; Norman, OK	NBC	L 13–14	61,700	
November 2	Missouri^{†}	No. 18	Folsom Field; Boulder, CO		L 6–9	41,000	
November 9	at Colorado State*		Colorado Field; Fort Collins, CO (rivalry)		W 20–0	7,000	
November 16	at Nebraska		Memorial Stadium; Lincoln, NE (rivalry)		W 27–0	28,000	
November 23	Iowa State		Folsom Field; Boulder, CO		W 38–21	21,000	
*Non-conference game; ^{†}Homecoming; Rankings from AP Poll released prior to the game; Source:
