= 1957 Furman Purple Hurricane football team =

American college football season

1957 Furman Purple Hurricane football
- Conference: Southern Conference
- Record: 3–7 (2–1 SoCon)
- Head coach: Homer Hobbs (3rd season)
- Captain: Jerry Penland
- Home stadium: Sirrine Stadium

1957 Southern Conference football standings
	Conf.					Overall
Team	W		L		T	W		L		T
No. 20 VMI $	6	–	0	–	0	9	–	0	–	1
West Virginia	3	–	0	–	0	7	–	2	–	1
The Citadel	4	–	2	–	0	5	–	4	–	1
Furman	2	–	1	–	0	3	–	7	–	0
Richmond	2	–	4	–	0	4	–	6	–	0
William & Mary	2	–	4	–	0	4	–	6	–	0
Davidson	1	–	3	–	0	5	–	3	–	0
VPI	1	–	3	–	0	4	–	5	–	0
George Washington	1	–	5	–	0	2	–	7	–	0
Washington and Lee	0	–	0	–	0	0	–	8	–	0
$ – Conference champion; Rankings from AP Poll

The 1957 Furman Purple Hurricane football team was an American football team that represented Furman University as a member of the Southern Conference (SoCon) during the 1957 college football season. Led by third-year head coach Homer Hobbs, the Purple Hurricane compiled an overall record of 3–7 with a mark of 2–1 in conference play, placing fourth in the SoCon.

== Schedule ==
Date	Opponent	Site	Result	Attendance	Source
September 14	East Tennessee State*	Sirrine Stadium; Greenville, SC	W 13–7		
September 21	at Florida State*	Doak Campbell Stadium; Tallahassee, FL	L 7–27	16,712	
September 28	at Villanova*	Villanova Stadium; Villanova, PA	L 0–20	10,000	
October 5	George Washington	Sirrine Stadium; Greenville, SC	W 13–12	5,000	
October 12	at South Carolina*	Carolina Stadium; Columbia, SC	L 13–58	15,000	
October 19	at Wofford*	Snyder Field; Spartanburg, SC (rivalry)	L 12–13	9,000	
October 26	at The Citadel	Johnson Hagood Stadium; Charleston, SC (rivalry)	L 14–18	12,000	
November 16	Chattanooga*	Sirrine Stadium; Greenville, SC	L 0–34	6,500	
November 22	Davidson	Sirrine Stadium; Greenville, SC	W 6–2		
November 30	Clemson*	Sirrine Stadium; Greenville, SC	L 6–45	10,000	
*Non-conference game
