= 1957 Villanova Wildcats football team =

American college football season

1957 Villanova Wildcats football
- Conference: Independent
- Record: 3–6
- Head coach: Frank Reagan (4th season)
- Captains: Donald Luzzi; William Magee
- Home stadium: Villanova Stadium

1957 Eastern major college football independents records
	Conf.			Overall
Team	W	L	T	W		L		T
No. 18 Army		–		7	–	2	–	0
Penn State		–		6	–	3	–	0
Boston University		–		5	–	3	–	0
Holy Cross		–		5	–	3	–	1
Syracuse		–		5	–	3	–	1
Pittsburgh		–		4	–	6	–	0
Colgate		–		3	–	6	–	0
Villanova		–		3	–	6	–	0
Rankings from AP poll

The 1957 Villanova Wildcats football team represented the Villanova University during the 1957 college football season. The head coach was Frank Reagan, coaching his fourth season with the Wildcats. The team played their home games at Villanova Stadium in Villanova, Pennsylvania.

== Schedule ==
Date	Opponent	Site	Result	Attendance	Source
September 21	at No. 7 Baylor	Baylor Stadium; Waco, TX	L 0–7	20,000	
September 28	Furman	Villanova Stadium; Villanova, PA	W 20–0	10,000	
October 5	Florida State^{†}	Villanova Stadium; Villanova, PA	W 21–7	13,000	
October 12	at VPI	Lane Stadium; Blacksburg, VA	L 14–21	14,000	
October 19	at Boston College	Alumni Stadium; Chestnut Hill, MA	L 9–12	12,000	
October 26	at Indiana	Memorial Stadium; Bloomington, IN	L 7–14	20,000	
November 1	at Miami (FL)	Burdine Stadium; Miami, FL	L 7–13	31,900	
November 9	at Detroit	University of Detroit Stadium; Detroit, MI	L 7–16	7,696	
November 23	Wichita	Villanova Stadium; Villanova, PA	W 24–6	6,200	
^{†}Homecoming; Rankings from AP Poll released prior to the game
