= 1957 Miami Hurricanes football team =

American college football season

1957 Miami Hurricanes football
- Conference: Independent
- Record: 5–4–1
- Head coach: Andy Gustafson (10th season)
- Home stadium: Burdine Stadium

1957 Southern major college football independents records
	Conf.			Overall
Team	W	L	T	W		L		T
No. 5 Navy		–		9	–	1	–	1
Oklahoma State		–		6	–	3	–	1
Miami (FL)		–		5	–	4	–	1
Florida State		–		4	–	6	–	0
Texas Tech		–		2	–	8	–	0
Rankings from AP poll

The 1957 Miami Hurricanes football team represented the University of Miami as an independent during the 1957 college football season. Led by tenth-year head coach Andy Gustafson, the Hurricanes played their home games at Burdine Stadium in Miami, Florida. Miami finished the season 5–4–1.

== Schedule ==
Date	Opponent	Rank	Site	Result	Attendance	Source
September 21	at Houston	No. 14	Rice Stadium; Houston, TX	L 0–7	52,000	
October 5	No. 11 Baylor		Burdine Stadium; Miami, FL	W 13–7	41,160	
October 11	No. 18 North Carolina		Burdine Stadium; Miami, FL	L 13–20	47,166	
October 18	No. 12 NC State		Burdine Stadium; Miami, FL	T 0–0	40,783	
October 25	Kansas		Burdine Stadium; Miami, FL	W 48–6	33,280	
November 1	Villanova		Burdine Stadium; Miami, FL	W 13–7	31,900	
November 8	at Florida State		Doak Campbell Stadium; Tallahassee, FL (rivalry)	W 40–13	15,712	
November 15	Maryland		Burdine Stadium; Miami, FL	L 6–16	42,701	
November 30	No. 20 Florida		Burdine Stadium; Miami, FL (rivalry)	L 0–14	59,507	
December 7	Pittsburgh		Burdine Stadium; Miami, FL	W 28–13	28,231	
Rankings from AP Poll released prior to the game

== Roster ==
- Jim Otto, So.
