= 1957 VMI Keydets football team =

American college football season

1957 VMI Keydets football

SoCon champion
- Conference: Southern Conference

Ranking
- AP: No. 20
- Record: 9–0–1 (6–0 SoCon)
- Head coach: John McKenna (5th season)
- Home stadium: Alumni Field

1957 Southern Conference football standings
	Conf.					Overall
Team	W		L		T	W		L		T
No. 20 VMI $	6	–	0	–	0	9	–	0	–	1
West Virginia	3	–	0	–	0	7	–	2	–	1
The Citadel	4	–	2	–	0	5	–	4	–	1
Furman	2	–	1	–	0	3	–	7	–	0
Richmond	2	–	4	–	0	4	–	6	–	0
William & Mary	2	–	4	–	0	4	–	6	–	0
Davidson	1	–	3	–	0	5	–	3	–	0
VPI	1	–	3	–	0	4	–	5	–	0
George Washington	1	–	5	–	0	2	–	7	–	0
Washington and Lee	0	–	0	–	0	0	–	8	–	0
$ – Conference champion; Rankings from AP Poll

The 1957 VMI Keydets football team was an American football team that represented the Virginia Military Institute (VMI) as a member of the Southern Conference (SoCon) during the 1957 college football season. Led by fifth-year head coach John McKenna, the Keydets compiled an overall record of 9–0–1 with a mark of 6–0 in conference play, winning the SoCon title. VMI was ranked No. 20 in the final AP Poll.

== Schedule ==
Date	Opponent	Rank	Site	Result	Attendance	Source
September 21	at Tampa*		Phillips Field; Tampa, FL	W 7–0		
September 28	at Holy Cross*		Fitton Field; Worcester, MA	T 21–21	10,000	
October 5	at Richmond		City Stadium; Richmond, VA	W 28–6		
October 12	Davidson		Alumni Memorial Field; Lexington, VA	W 26–14	4,000	
October 19	at William & Mary		Cary Field; Williamsburg, VA (rivalry)	W 14–13		
October 26	vs. George Washington		Victory Stadium; Roanoke, VA	W 26–20	3,500	
November 2	at Virginia*		Scott Stadium; Charlottesville, VA	W 20–7	21,000	
November 9	at Lehigh*	No. 20	Taylor Stadium; Bethlehem, PA	W 12–7	13,500	
November 16	vs. The Citadel	No. 13	City Stadium; Lynchburg, VA (rivalry)	W 33–7	9,000	
November 28	vs. VPI	No. 17	Victory Stadium; Roanoke, VA (rivalry)	W 14–6	25,000	
*Non-conference game; Rankings from AP Poll released prior to the game

== Roster ==
- Carl Kasko End
- Sam Horner halfback
- Pete Johnson halfback
- Bill Nebraska quarterback
- Duke Johnston quarterback
- Bobby Jordan halfback
- Sam Woolwine fullback
