= 1957 Iowa State Cyclones football team =

American college football season

1957 Iowa State Cyclones football
- Conference: Big Seven Conference
- Record: 4–5–1 (2–4 Big 7)
- Head coach: Jim Myers (1st season)
- Captains: John Falter; Marv Walter
- Home stadium: Clyde Williams Field

1957 Big Seven Conference football standings
	Conf.					Overall
Team	W		L		T	W		L		T
No. 4 Oklahoma $	6	–	0	–	0	10	–	1	–	0
Kansas	4	–	2	–	0	5	–	4	–	1
Missouri	3	–	3	–	0	5	–	4	–	1
Colorado	3	–	3	–	0	6	–	3	–	1
Iowa State	2	–	4	–	0	4	–	5	–	1
Kansas State	2	–	4	–	0	3	–	6	–	1
Nebraska	1	–	5	–	0	1	–	9	–	0
$ – Conference champion; Rankings from AP Poll

The 1957 Iowa State Cyclones football team represented Iowa State College of Agricultural and Mechanic Arts (later renamed Iowa State University) in the Big Seven Conference during the 1957 college football season. In their first and only year under head coach Jim Myers, the Cyclones compiled a 4–5–1 record (2–4 against conference opponents), tied for fifth place in the conference, and were outscored by their opponents by a combined total of 160 to 142. They played their home games at Clyde Williams Field in Ames, Iowa.

The team's regular starting lineup on offense consisted of left end Brian Dennis, left tackle Andris Poncius, left guard Bob Bird, center Jack Falter, right guard Dave Munger, right tackle Don Metcalf, right end Jim Stuelke, quarterback Marv Walter, left halfback Dwight Nichols, right halfback Jim Lary, and fullback Bob Harden. John Falter and Marv Walter were the team captains.

The team's statistical leaders included Dwight Nichols with 668 rushing yards and 751 passing yards, Brian Dennis with 252 receiving yards, and Dwight Nichols and Terry Ingram with 24 points each. Dwight Nichols was selected as a first-team all-conference player.

== Schedule ==
Date	Time	Opponent	Site	TV	Result	Attendance	Source
September 21	2:00 pm	Denver*	Clyde Williams Field; Ames, IA		W 10–0	12,385	
September 28	11:30 am	at Syracuse*	Archbold Stadium; Syracuse, NY		T 7–7	21,000	
October 5	2:00 pm	at No. 1 Oklahoma	Oklahoma Memorial Stadium; Norman, OK		L 14–40	53,392	
October 12	1:35 pm	at Kansas	Memorial Stadium; Lawrence, KS	KMBC/KRNT	W 21–6	21,000	
October 19	2:00 pm	Missouri	Clyde Williams Field; Ames, IA (rivalry)		L 13–35	16,000	
October 26	2:00 pm	Kansas State^{†}	Clyde Williams Field; Ames, IA (rivalry)		L 10–14	17,000	
November 2	2:00 pm	at Drake*	Drake Stadium; Des Moines, IA		L 0–20	6,557–7,500	
November 9	2:00 pm	Nebraska	Clyde Williams Field; Ames, IA (rivalry)	KMBC/KRNT	W 13–0	10,000	
November 16	2:00 pm	South Dakota*	Clyde Williams Field; Ames, IA		W 33–0	5,095	
November 23	3:05 pm	at Colorado	Folsom Field; Boulder, CO		L 21–38	21,000	
*Non-conference game; ^{†}Homecoming; Rankings from AP Poll released prior to the game; All times are in Central time; Source:
