= 1957 Nebraska Cornhuskers football team =

American college football season

1957 Nebraska Cornhuskers football
- Conference: Big Seven Conference
- Record: 1–9 (1–5 Big 7)
- Head coach: Bill Jennings (1st season)
- Home stadium: Memorial Stadium

1957 Big Seven Conference football standings
	Conf.					Overall
Team	W		L		T	W		L		T
No. 4 Oklahoma $	6	–	0	–	0	10	–	1	–	0
Kansas	4	–	2	–	0	5	–	4	–	1
Missouri	3	–	3	–	0	5	–	4	–	1
Colorado	3	–	3	–	0	6	–	3	–	1
Iowa State	2	–	4	–	0	4	–	5	–	1
Kansas State	2	–	4	–	0	3	–	6	–	1
Nebraska	1	–	5	–	0	1	–	9	–	0
$ – Conference champion; Rankings from AP Poll

The 1957 Nebraska Cornhuskers football team was the representative of the University of Nebraska and member of the Big 7 Conference in the 1957 college football season. The team was coached by Bill Jennings and played their home games at Memorial Stadium in Lincoln, Nebraska.

== Before the season ==
New head coach Jennings had only been on the Nebraska football staff for one year, as backfield coach, before ascending to the top spot. With three new assistants on staff, he faced a difficult 1957 schedule. A home opener against Washington State would be followed by three straight road games, one of which was against longtime nemesis Pittsburgh. Upon the return to Lincoln there would be one more nonconference game against always-tough Syracuse, the first meeting of these teams since 1929. Now in its 16th year, the long stretch of Nebraska futility would be difficult to halt against this slate.

== Schedule ==
Date	Time	Opponent	Site	TV	Result	Attendance	Source
September 21	2:00 pm	Washington State*	Memorial Stadium; Lincoln, NE		L 12–34	31,000	
September 28	12:00 pm	at Army*	Michie Stadium; West Point, NY		L 0–42	20,500	
October 5	1:30 pm	at Kansas State	Memorial Stadium; Manhattan, KS (rivalry)		W 14–7	14,000	
October 12	11:30 am	at No. 20 Pittsburgh*	Pitt Stadium; Pittsburgh, PA		L 0–34	40,023	
October 19	2:00 pm	Syracuse*	Memorial Stadium; Lincoln, NE		L 9–26	37,582	
October 26	1:30 pm	at Missouri	Memorial Stadium; Columbia, MO (rivalry)		L 13–14	23,000	
November 2	2:00 pm	Kansas^{†}	Memorial Stadium; Lincoln, NE (rivalry)		L 12–14	31,000	
November 9	2:00 pm	at Iowa State	Clyde Williams Field; Ames, IA (rivalry)	NBC	L 0–13	10,000	
November 16	2:00 pm	Colorado	Memorial Stadium; Lincoln, NE (rivalry)		L 0–27	28,000	
November 23	2:00 pm	No. 6 Oklahoma	Memorial Stadium; Lincoln, NE (rivalry)		L 7–32	30,000	
*Non-conference game; ^{†}Homecoming; Rankings from AP Poll released prior to the game; Source:

== Roster ==
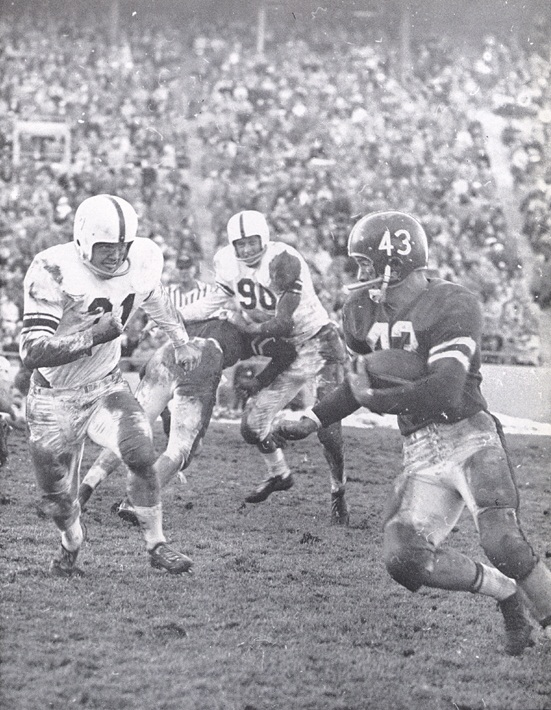
Halfback Larry Naviaux

Official Roster
16 Baehr, Bob LT (So.); 19 Boellstorff, Doug RG (So.); 83 Brede, Roger E (So.); 35 Brown, Jerry FB (Sr.); 30 Cifra, George FB (Sr.); 54 Cochran, Michael C (So.); 80 Cook, Clarence E (Sr.); 71 Cowan, Mike RT (Jr.); 47 Dillard, Bennie HB (Jr.); 70 Dohrman, Melvin LT (Jr.); 79 Dunham, Guy LT (Jr.); 84 Engel, Raymond E (Sr.); 66 Fitzgerald, Pat RG (So.); 78 Fleming, Bob RT (So.); 10 Flock, WilliamDean HB (Jr.); 42 George, Leo HB (Sr.); 38 Haman, Gene FB (Sr.); 20 Harshman, George QB (Sr.); 73 Hart, Joseph LT (Sr.); 23 Haskins, Clyde QB (So.); 81 Hawkins, William E (Sr.); 46 Hergenreter, Jim HB (So.); 88 Hilding, Marlin E (Sr.); 64 Howerter, Stuart LG (Sr.); 61 Kampe, Lester RG (Sr.); 13 Klasna, Norman HB (So.); 62 Kleiber, Dick RG (Sr.); 65 Klein, Arthur RG (Sr.); 75 Klingaman, Richard RT (Jr.)	44 Krhounek, Roger HB (So.); 82 Lee, Michael E (Jr.); 17 Logue, Mike C (So.); 51 Lyall, Bob C (Sr.); 85 Mangialardi, Chris E (So.); 12 Martz, Max HB (So.); 50 McCashland, Dick C (Jr.); 76 Mongerson, Duane LT (So.); 55 Moore, James C (So.); 43 Naviaux, Larry HB (Jr.); 77 Olson, Don RT (So.); 31 Penney, Don FB (So.); 63 Petersen, Jerry LG (Sr.); 68 Ponsiego, John LG (So.); 52 Prusia, Dick C (Sr.); 74 Rhoda, Donald LT (Sr.); 14 Sandage, Gene HB (Sr.); 86 Sapp, Guy E (Jr.); 32 Schroeder, Jerry FB (So.); 67 Siemer, Dale LG (So.); 22 Stinnett, Roy QB (Jr.); 69 Swartz, David LG (So.); 36 Thomas, Douglas QB (Sr.); 21 Tolly, Harry QB (So.); 87 Tuning, Bill E (So.); 72 Wheeler, Jerry RT (Sr.); 40 Zaruba, Carroll HB (Jr.); 53 Zentic, LeRoy C (So.)

== Coaching staff ==
Name	Title	First year in this position	Years at Nebraska	Alma mater
Bill Jennings	Head coach	1957	1956–1961	Oklahoma
L. F. "Pop" Klein	Assistant coach	1945	1945–1958	
Don Strasheim		1954	1954–1958	Nebraska
Don Scarbrough	Assistant coach	1956	1956–1961	
Dick Monroe		1957	1957–1961	
Warren Schmakel		1957	1957–1959	
Jack Landry		1957	1957	

== Game summaries ==
=== Washington State ===
Team	1	2	Total
• Washington State			34
Nebraska			12

- Date: September 21
- Location: Memorial Stadium • Lincoln, Nebraska
- Game attendance: 31,152

These teams had only met one time prior, a 21–20 defeat of the Cornhuskers in Lincoln in 1920. The Cougars brought with them a reputation as an outstanding passing offense, and true to form used their game plan to roll up points by air faster than Nebraska could respond by ground. The Bill Jennings era opened with a loss.

=== Army ===
Team	1	2	Total
Nebraska			0
• Army			42

- Date: September 28
- Location: Michie Stadium • West Point, New York
- Game attendance: 16,654

In the second meeting of these teams, the Black Knights of West Point utterly obliterated the Cornhuskers in front of a relatively small Michie Stadium crowd. No matter which way they turned, by air or ground, all of Nebraska's attempts to at least avoid the shutout were thwarted. Army went on to finish the season ranked #18 by the AP Poll.

=== Kansas State ===
Team	1	2	Total
• Nebraska			14
Kansas State			7

- Date: October 5
- Location: Memorial Stadium • Manhattan, Kansas
- Game attendance: 15,033

The Cornhuskers traveled to Manhattan for the first Big 7 contest of the season, again in front of a sparse crowd. While the Cornhuskers managed only two touchdowns on the day, the hapless Wildcats were unable to move the ball enough to score more than once. Nebraska had notched the first win of the year and improved to 32–7–2 in the Kansas State series to date, but there was little time to celebrate. The difficult road trip to Pittsburgh, now ranked #20 by the AP Poll, was next up.

=== Pittsburgh ===
Team	1	2	Total
Nebraska			0
• #20 Pittsburgh			34

- Date: October 12
- Location: Pitt Stadium • Pittsburgh
- Game attendance: 39,493

For the second time of the season, Nebraska was dealt a punishing road game shutout defeat, this time at the hands of bitter rival Pittsburgh. The Panthers, who nearly always seemed to have Nebraska's number, improved to 15–3–3 over the Cornhuskers all time with their sixth straight win in the series. Nebraska had now stumbled out to a 1–3 start thanks in part to the grueling schedule, and the situation was not looking like it would improve.

=== Syracuse ===
Team	1	2	Total
• Syracuse			26
Nebraska			9

- Date: October 19
- Location: Memorial Stadium • Lincoln, Nebraska
- Game attendance: 37,582

Renewing an old series last updated in 1929, the Orangemen arrived in Lincoln as Nebraska's final nonconference foe of the year. Unfortunately for the struggling Cornhuskers, the slide continued as Syracuse handled the Big Red's efforts with relative ease. With the win, Syracuse also evened up the all-time series between the programs at 4–4–0.

=== Missouri ===
Team	1	2	Total
Nebraska			13
• Missouri			14

- Date: October 26
- Location: Faurot Field • Columbia, Missouri
- Game attendance: 26,058

Returning to the Big 7 schedule, the downtrodden Cornhuskers traveled to Columbia to face Missouri, and to defend their custody of the Victory Bell. The tone of the season seemed to be set, however, and Nebraska's three-game winning streak against the Tigers was broken by a painful single-point 13–14 loss. Though the Cornhuskers still held a daunting series lead of 28–19–3, the Bell was handed over to the Tigers.

=== Kansas ===
Team	1	2	Total
• Kansas			14
Nebraska			12

- Date: November 2
- Location: Memorial Stadium • Lincoln, Nebraska
- Game attendance: 29,987

Nebraska's hopes to put up a win for the homecoming crowd in Lincoln were dashed when Kansas arrived and dealt a two-point loss to the Cornhuskers, snapping Nebraska's five-game winning streak over the Jayhawks. The Cornhuskers still held a commanding 46–14–3 series edge, but were now just 1–6 on the season.

=== Iowa State ===
Team	1	2	Total
Nebraska			0
• Iowa State			13

- Date: November 9
- Location: Clyde Williams Field • Ames, Iowa
- Game attendance: 6,083

If there was hope for a victory to break the slide, it would have most likely been placed against the Cyclones, over which the Cornhuskers had run off 11 straight wins. Iowa State was well aware of Nebraska's skid, and were not intimidated by the visitors from Lincoln. Not only did the Cyclones snap their losing streak, they also dealt the season's third shutout defeat to the Cornhuskers in front of a surprisingly sparse crowd. This loss was Nebraska's fifth in a row, tying an all-time losing streak record set in 1941 and tied in 1945. The Cornhuskers still held a 41–9–1 lead in the series, but this loss was perhaps the lowest point of a very low season.

=== Colorado ===
Team	1	2	Total
• Colorado			27
Nebraska			0

- Date: November 16
- Location: Memorial Stadium • Lincoln, Nebraska
- Game attendance: 29,264

Nebraska had just one more game with any hope of a victory before facing the defending league champion Sooners. Even with home field advantage, however, the Cornhuskers fell again and were handed the year's fourth shutout loss, at the hands of the Buffaloes. Colorado's win narrowed the series to 9–7–0, and set a new Nebraska all-time record of six consecutive losses.

=== Oklahoma ===
Team	1	2	Total
• #6 Oklahoma			32
Nebraska			7

- Date: November 23
- Location: Memorial Stadium • Lincoln, Nebraska
- Game attendance: 29,844

Any fight that might have been left in Nebraska, as they marched onto the field at Memorial Stadium with only a 1–8 record to show for their work, was quickly expended shortly after the season-ending rivalry with Oklahoma was underway. The Sooners were in fact prevented from scoring in the first quarter, a noteworthy accomplishment when considering the opponent, but Nebraska soon folded under the onslaught and ended the 1957 campaign with another loss, the 15th in a row to Oklahoma. Nebraska's all-time losing streak record was extended to seven with the defeat, as the Sooners took over the series at 17–16–3. Oklahoma went on to finish the season ranked #4 by the AP Poll.

== After the season ==
It was known going in that Coach Jennings' first year was going to be a tough season, but that did not soften the sting of a 1–9 final record, the most losses in a single season and the worst overall season record in program history. The only other prior year that the Cornhusker football squad had only pulled down a single win was 1899's 1–7–1 campaign. Nebraska's overall program record tumbled to 352–198–34 (.009), the seventh straight year to see a drop in winning percentage, as the Big 7 history also slipped, to 147–63–12 (.689).

== Future professional players ==
- Clarence Cook, 1957 18th-round pick of the Los Angeles Rams
