= 1957 Florida State Seminoles football team =

American college football season

1957 Florida State Seminoles football
- Conference: Independent
- Record: 4–6
- Head coach: Tom Nugent (5th season)
- Captain: Ron Schomburger
- Home stadium: Doak Campbell Stadium

1957 Southern major college football independents records
	Conf.			Overall
Team	W	L	T	W		L		T
No. 5 Navy		–		9	–	1	–	1
Oklahoma State		–		6	–	3	–	1
Miami (FL)		–		5	–	4	–	1
Florida State		–		4	–	6	–	0
Texas Tech		–		2	–	8	–	0
Rankings from AP poll

The 1957 Florida State Seminoles football team represented Florida State University as an independent during the 1957 college football season. Led by fifth-year head coach Tom Nugent, the Seminoles compiled a record of 4–6.

Burt Reynolds was on this team.

== Schedule ==
Date	Opponent	Site	Result	Attendance	Source
September 21	Furman	Doak Campbell Stadium; Tallahassee, FL	W 27–7	16,712	
September 28	at Boston College	Alumni Stadium; Chestnut Hill, MA	L 7–20	10,000	
October 5	at Villanova	Villanova Stadium; Villanova, PA	L 7–21	13,000	
October 12	No. 13 NC State	Doak Campbell Stadium; Tallahassee, FL	L 0–7	16,200	
October 19	Abilene Christian	Doak Campbell Stadium; Tallahassee, FL	W 34–7	15,340	
October 26	VPI	Doak Campbell Stadium; Tallahassee, FL	W 20–7	18,556	
November 8	Miami (FL)	Doak Campbell Stadium; Tallahassee, FL (rivalry)	L 13–40	15,712	
November 16	at Mississippi Southern	Faulkner Field; Hattiesburg, MS	L 0–20	12,500	
November 23	No. 2 Auburn	Doak Campbell Stadium; Tallahassee, FL	L 7–29	15,000	
November 30	at Tampa	Phillips Field; Tampa, FL	W 21–7	12,000	
Rankings from AP Poll released prior to the game

== Roster ==
86 Jim Arnold E

83 Clare "Bud" Bagnell E

52 Troy Barnes C

42 Carmen Battaglia FB

63 Abner Bigbie G

81 Ham Bisbee E

77 George Boyer T

Bill Brown T

76 Royce Bryan T

21 Bob Carnes HB

54 Ron Clark C

27 Stan Dobosz HB

66 Bob Douglas T

Jim Dukate G

89 Jim Elk E

78 Tony Fekany T

88 Pete Fleming E

65 Bob Fountain G

Willie Gardner T

67 Jerry Graham G

Wayne Helms HB

14 Jerry Henderson QB

71 Steve Holton T

88 Jim Hooks E

82 Bill Jacobs E

68 Jon Jenkins C

44 Eddie Johnson FB

87 Roy Jones R

53 Stu Keith C

84 Bill Kimber E

70 Jerry Lane T

22 Lenny Levy HB

13 Joe Majors QB

43 Lou Manning FB

12 Gene McCormick QB

61 Joe McGee G

28 Wes Minton HB

69 Patsy Monaco G

76 Jerry Moore T

73 Bill Musselman T

85 Bob Nellums E

John Nevelle FB

28 Pete Overton E

Arnold Peebles G

24 Jerry Philp HB

25 Fred Pickard HB

74 Mel Pope C

Vic Prinzi QB

15 Bobby Renn QB

20 Burt "Buddy" Reynolds HB

11 Ted Rodrigue QB

64 Jim Rogers G

51 Ramon Rogers C

29 Pappy Rozman HB

66 Joe Russo G

83 Gene Schlickman E

80 Ron Schomburger E

23 Johnny Sheppard HB-K

50 Paul Slaton C

75 Paul Smith G

60 Don Speirs G

87 John Spivey E

72 Dan Strickland T

40 Terrell Teague FB

62 Al Ulmer G

79 Lou Wallace T

70 Joe Wallis T

26 Billy Weaver HB

16 Ron Williams QB
