= 1957 Syracuse Orangemen football team =

American college football season

1957 Syracuse Orangemen football
- Conference: Independent
- Record: 5–3–1
- Head coach: Ben Schwartzwalder (9th season)
- Captain: Game captains
- Home stadium: Archbold Stadium

1957 Eastern major college football independents records
	Conf.			Overall
Team	W	L	T	W		L		T
No. 18 Army		–		7	–	2	–	0
Penn State		–		6	–	3	–	0
Boston University		–		5	–	3	–	0
Holy Cross		–		5	–	3	–	1
Syracuse		–		5	–	3	–	1
Pittsburgh		–		4	–	6	–	0
Colgate		–		3	–	6	–	0
Villanova		–		3	–	6	–	0
Rankings from AP poll

The 1957 Syracuse Orangemen football team represented Syracuse University as an independent during the 1957 college football season. The Orangemen were led by ninth-year head coach Ben Schwartzwalder and played their home games at Archbold Stadium in Syracuse, New York. Syracuse finished with a record of 5–3–1 and were not invited to a bowl game.

== Schedule ==
Date	Opponent	Site	Result	Attendance	Source
September 28	Iowa State	Archbold Stadium; Syracuse, NY	T 7–7	21,000	
October 5	Boston University	Archbold Stadium; Syracuse, NY	W 27–20	16,000	
October 12	at Cornell	Schoellkopf Field; Ithaca, NY	W 34–0	25,000	
October 19	at Nebraska	Memorial Stadium; Lincoln, NE	W 26–9	37,582	
October 26	Penn State	Archbold Stadium; Syracuse, NY (rivalry)	L 12–20	35,000	
November 2	at Pittsburgh	Pitt Stadium; Pittsburgh, PA (rivalry)	W 24–21	35,430	
November 9	Holy Cross	Archbold Stadium; Syracuse, NY	L 19–20	15,000	
November 16	Colgate	Archbold Stadium; Syracuse, NY (rivalry)	W 34–6	38,500	
November 23	at West Virginia	Mountaineer Field; Morgantown, WV (rivalry)	L 0–7	26,000	
