= 1957 East Carolina Pirates football team =

American college football season

1957 East Carolina Pirates football
- Conference: North State Conference
- Record: 1–8 (0–5 NSC)
- Head coach: Jack Boone (6th season)
- Home stadium: College Stadium

1957 North State Conference football standings
	Conf.					Overall
Team	W		L		T	W		L		T
Lenoir Rhyne $	5	–	1	–	0	8	–	2	–	1
Elon	4	–	0	–	0	6	–	0	–	0
Catawba	3	–	2	–	0	4	–	3	–	0
Western Carolina	2	–	2	–	1	2	–	5	–	1
Appalachian State	2	–	4	–	0	4	–	6	–	0
Guilford	1	–	3	–	1	1	–	6	–	1
East Carolina	0	–	5	–	0	1	–	8	–	0
$ – Conference champion

The 1957 East Carolina Pirates football team was an American football team that represented East Carolina College (now known as East Carolina University) as a member of the North State Conference during the 1957 NAIA football season. In their sixth season under head coach Jack Boone, the team compiled a 1–8 record.

== Schedule ==
Date	Opponent	Site	Result	Attendance	Source
September 18	at Richmond*	Portsmouth, VA	L 7–40	8,000	
September 28	Davidson*	College Stadium; Greenville, NC	L 6–19	5,500	
October 5	at Catawba	Shuford Stadium; Salisbury, NC	L 14–36		
October 12	Elon	College Stadium; Greenville, NC	L 12–21		
October 19	at Western Carolina	Memorial Stadium; Cullowhee, NC	L 7–20	3,500	
October 26	Newberry*	College Stadium; Greenville, NC	L 7–20	2,000	
November 2	Appalachian State	College Stadium; Greenville, NC	L 6–7		
November 9	Lenoir Rhyne	College Stadium; Greenville, NC	L 7–55		
November 16	at Presbyterian*	Old Bailey Stadium; Clinton, SC	W 6–0		
*Non-conference game
