= Frank Moseley =

American football player and coach (1911–1979)

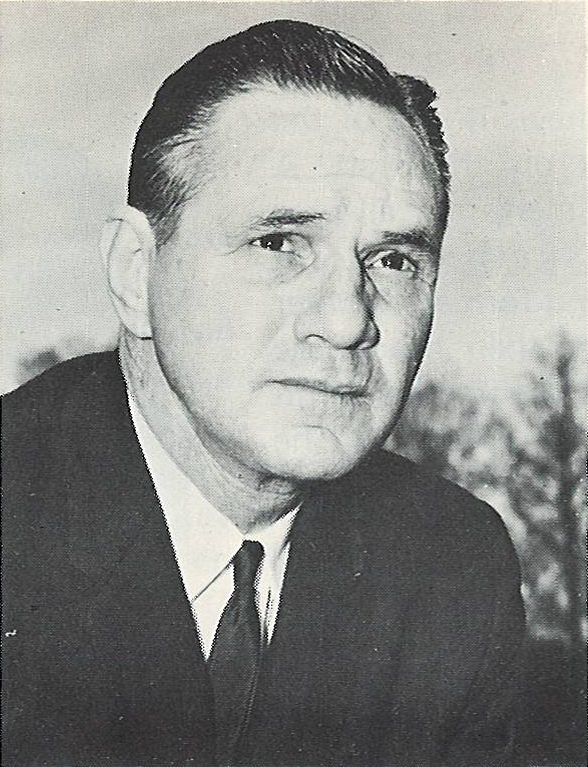
- Moseley, c. 1972

Biographical details
- Born: April 22, 1911; Montgomery, Alabama, U.S.
- Died: July 31, 1979 (aged 68); Blacksburg, Virginia, U.S.

Playing career

Football
- 1931–1933: Alabama
- Position: Halfback

Coaching career (HC unless noted)

Football
- 1945: Maryland (assistant)
- 1946–1950: Kentucky (backfield)
- 1951–1960: VPI / Virginia Tech

Baseball
- 1939–1941: Kentucky
- 1946: Kentucky
- 1948–1950: Kentucky

Administrative career (AD unless noted)
- 1951–1978: VPI / Virginia Tech

Head coaching record
- Overall: 54–42–4 (football); 60–55–1 (baseball)

Frank O'Rear Moseley (April 22, 1911 – July 31, 1979) was an American football player and coach, baseball coach, and college athletics administrator. He served as the head football coach at Virginia Polytechnic Institute and State University from 1951 to 1960, compiling a record of 54–42–4. His best season at Virginia Tech came in 1954, when his team went 8–0–1. Moselely was also the head baseball coach at the University of Kentucky (1939–1941, 1946, 1948–1950), tallying a mark of 60–55–1. In addition, he served as the athletic director at Virginia Tech from 1951 to 1978, during which time he hired Jerry Claiborne, his successor as head football coach. Moseley was born in Montgomery, Alabama and died on July 31, 1979. In 1979, Moseley was inducted into the Virginia Sports Hall of Fame. He was elected to the Virginia Tech Sports Hall of Fame as an inaugural member in 1982.

== Head coaching record ==
=== Football ===
Year	Team	Overall	Conference	Standing	Bowl/playoffs	AP^{#}
VPI / Virginia Tech Gobblers (Southern Conference) (1951–1960)
1951	VPI	2–8	1–7	17th		
1952	VPI	5–6	4–4	T–6th		
1953	VPI	5–5	3–3	T–5th		
1954	VPI	8–0–1	3–0–1	3rd		16
1955	VPI	6–3–1	2–1–1	2nd		
1956	VPI	7–2–1	3–0	2nd		
1957	VPI	4–6	1–3	T–7th		
1958	VPI	5–4–1	3–1	2nd		
1959	Virginia Tech	6–4	3–1	3rd		
1960	Virginia Tech	6–4	4–2	T–2nd		
VPI / Virginia Tech:		54–42–4	27–22–2			
Total:		54–42–4				
^{#}Rankings from final AP Poll.
