= 1957 VPI Gobblers football team =

American college football season

1957 VPI Gobblers football
- Conference: Southern Conference
- Record: 4–6 (1–3 SoCon)
- Head coach: Frank Moseley (7th season)
- Home stadium: Miles Stadium

1957 Southern Conference football standings
	Conf.					Overall
Team	W		L		T	W		L		T
No. 20 VMI $	6	–	0	–	0	9	–	0	–	1
West Virginia	3	–	0	–	0	7	–	2	–	1
The Citadel	4	–	2	–	0	5	–	4	–	1
Furman	2	–	1	–	0	3	–	7	–	0
Richmond	2	–	4	–	0	4	–	6	–	0
William & Mary	2	–	4	–	0	4	–	6	–	0
Davidson	1	–	3	–	0	5	–	3	–	0
VPI	1	–	3	–	0	4	–	5	–	0
George Washington	1	–	5	–	0	2	–	7	–	0
Washington and Lee	0	–	0	–	0	0	–	8	–	0
$ – Conference champion; Rankings from AP Poll

The 1957 VPI Gobblers football team represented the Virginia Polytechnic Institute or VPI (now known as Virginia Polytechnic Institute and State University or Virginia Tech) as a member of the Southern Conference (SoCon) during the 1957 college football season. Led by seventh-year head coach Frank Moseley the Gobblers compiled an overall record of 4–6 with a mark of 1–3 in conference play, and finished eighth in the SoCon. VPI played home games at Miles Stadium in Blacksburg, Virginia.

== Schedule ==
Date	Time	Opponent	Site	Result	Attendance	Source
September 20		at Tulane*	Tulane Stadium; New Orleans, LA	W 14–13	32,000	
September 28		at West Virginia	Mountaineer Field; Morgantown, WV (rivalry)	L 0–14	26,000	
October 5		at William & Mary	Cary Field; Williamsburg, VA	L 7–13	10,000	
October 12		Villanova*^{†}	Miles Stadium; Blacksburg, VA	W 21–14	14,000	
October 19		vs. Virginia*	City Stadium; Richmond, VA (Tobacco Bowl, rivalry)	L 7–38	23,442	
October 26		at Florida State*	Doak Campbell Stadium; Tallahassee, FL	L 7–20	18,556	
November 2		Richmond	Miles Stadium; Blacksburg, VA	W 42–7	5,500	
November 9	2:00 p.m.	at Wake Forest*	Bowman Gray Stadium; Winston-Salem, NC	W 10–3	5,500	
November 16	1:30 p.m.	vs. No. 19 NC State*	Victory Stadium; Roanoke, VA	L 0–12		
November 28		vs. No. 17 VMI	Victory Stadium; Roanoke, VA (rivalry)	L 6–14	25,000	
*Non-conference game; ^{†}Homecoming; Rankings from AP Poll released prior to the game; All times are in Eastern time

== Roster ==
The following players were members of the 1957 football team according to the roster published in the 1958 edition of The Bugle, the Virginia Tech yearbook.

VPI 1957 roster
Corbin Bailey; Clyde Barnette; Edwin M. Bartrug, Jr.; Tom Betz; Charles Philip Blankenship; Ed Brinkley; James Alexander Burks; Kenneth Arnold Byrd; Pat Luis Carpenito; Bobby Conner; William C. Cranwell; Carroll Dale; Frank H. Eastman; Ray England; Barry Frazee; Pat Henry; John Herndon	Billy Holsclaw; William Duncan Holsclaw, Jr.; John Hubard; Ben Hunter; Harold Jones; Walt Koenig; Jim Kosko; Leland Lawson; Jim Lugar; Robert A. Mangum; Bob McCoy; Julian Russell McCubbin; William Roderick McGinnis; Don McPeak; Charles Moberg jr.; John Moody; Russell Sidney Moon	Harry Parrish; William Alger Pugh; Jim Randall; Dick Ringer; O. Douglas Royals; Bernard Frank Schmidt; Albert Sebest; Sam Shaffer; Dickie Snead; Chuck Stephens; William J. Story, III; Billy Tilling; Donald Ray Vaught; Frank Webster; Kenneth Ray Wheeler; Jay N. Whitesell; Brian Zittrain

== Coaching staff ==
The following coaches were members of the 1957 football team according to the roster published in the 1958 edition of The Bugle.

VPI 1957 coaches' roster
Head coach: Frank Moseley; Assistant coach: Buck Chapman; Macauley McEver; Alf Satterfield; Don Watson	Trainer: Ed Motley; Equipment Manager: Luke Lindon
