= 1957 Boston University Terriers football team =

American college football season

1957 Boston University Terriers football
- Conference: Independent
- Record: 5–3
- Head coach: Steve Sinko (1st season)
- Home stadium: Boston University Field

1957 Eastern major college football independents records
	Conf.			Overall
Team	W	L	T	W		L		T
No. 18 Army		–		7	–	2	–	0
Penn State		–		6	–	3	–	0
Boston University		–		5	–	3	–	0
Holy Cross		–		5	–	3	–	1
Syracuse		–		5	–	3	–	1
Pittsburgh		–		4	–	6	–	0
Colgate		–		3	–	6	–	0
Villanova		–		3	–	6	–	0
Rankings from AP poll

The 1957 Boston University Terriers football team was an American football team that represented Boston University as an independent during the 1957 college football season. In its first season under head coach Steve Sinko, the team compiled a 5–3 record and outscored opponents by a total of 196 to 141.

== Schedule ==
Date	Opponent	Site	Result	Attendance	Source
September 28	UMass	Boston University Field; Boston, MA	W 66–6	10,000	
October 5	at Syracuse	Archbold Stadium; Syracuse, NY	L 20–27	16,000	
October 12	West Virginia	Boston University Field; Boston, MA	L 6–46	9,000	
October 19	at Bucknell	Memorial Stadium; Lewisburg, PA	W 28–0	6,500	
October 26	Holy Cross	Boston University Field; Boston, MA	W 35–28	10,500	
November 1	at George Washington	Griffith Stadium; Washington, DC	W 7–0	1,000	
November 9	Boston College	Boston University Field; Boston, MA (rivalry)	L 2–27	25,500	
November 23	Connecticut	Boston University Field; Boston, MA	W 32–7	10,000	
