= 1957 George Washington Colonials football team =

American college football season

1957 George Washington Colonials football
- Conference: Southern Conference
- Record: 2–7 (1–5 SoCon)
- Head coach: Bo Sherman (6th season)
- Home stadium: Griffith Stadium

1957 Southern Conference football standings
	Conf.					Overall
Team	W		L		T	W		L		T
No. 20 VMI $	6	–	0	–	0	9	–	0	–	1
West Virginia	3	–	0	–	0	7	–	2	–	1
The Citadel	4	–	2	–	0	5	–	4	–	1
Furman	2	–	1	–	0	3	–	7	–	0
Richmond	2	–	4	–	0	4	–	6	–	0
William & Mary	2	–	4	–	0	4	–	6	–	0
Davidson	1	–	3	–	0	5	–	3	–	0
VPI	1	–	3	–	0	4	–	5	–	0
George Washington	1	–	5	–	0	2	–	7	–	0
Washington and Lee	0	–	0	–	0	0	–	8	–	0
$ – Conference champion; Rankings from AP Poll

The 1957 George Washington Colonials football team was an American football team that represented George Washington University as part of the Southern Conference during the 1957 college football season. In their sixth season under head coach Bo Sherman, the team compiled a 2–7 record (1–5 in the SoCon).

== Schedule ==
Date	Opponent	Site	Result	Attendance	Source
September 21	at William & Mary	Cary Field; Williamsburg, VA	W 7–0	8,000	
September 27	The Citadel	Griffith Stadium; Washington, DC	L 6–13		
October 5	at Furman	Sirrine Stadium; Greenville, SC	L 12–13	5,000	
October 11	Air Force*	Griffith Stadium; Washington, DC	W 20–0	12,000	
October 19	West Virginia	Griffith Stadium; Washington, DC	L 14–34	8,000	
October 26	vs. VMI	Victory Stadium; Roanoke, VA	L 20–26	3,500	
November 1	Boston University*	Griffith Stadium; Washington, DC	L 0–7	1,000	
November 9	at Richmond	City Stadium; Richmond, VA	L 6–13	5,000	
November 16	at No. 9 Navy*	Memorial Stadium; Baltimore, MD	L 0–52	10,000	
*Non-conference game; Rankings from Coaches' Poll released prior to the game
