= 1957 Western Kentucky Hilltoppers football team =

American college football season

1957 Western Kentucky Hilltoppers football
- Conference: Ohio Valley Conference
- Record: 5–3–1 (1–3–1 OVC)
- Head coach: Nick Denes (1st season)
- Captains: Twyman Patterson; Carroll VanHooser

1957 Ohio Valley Conference football standings
	Conf.					Overall
Team	W		L		T	W		L		T
Middle Tennessee $	5	–	0	–	0	10	–	0	–	0
Tennessee Tech	4	–	1	–	0	6	–	4	–	0
Eastern Kentucky	3	–	2	–	0	4	–	5	–	0
Western Kentucky	1	–	3	–	1	5	–	3	–	1
Murray State	1	–	3	–	1	3	–	5	–	1
Morehead State	0	–	5	–	0	2	–	7	–	0
$ – Conference champion

The 1957 Western Kentucky Hilltoppers football team represented Western Kentucky State College (now known as Western Kentucky University) as a member of the Ohio Valley Conference (OVC) during the 1957 college football season. Led by first-year head coach Nick Denes, the Hilltoppers compiled an overall record of 5-3-1 with a mark of 1-3-1 in conference play, tying for fourth place in the OVC. The team's captains were Twyman Patterson and Carroll VanHooser.

== Schedule ==
Date	Opponent	Site	Result
September 21	at Southeast Missouri State*	Cape Girardeau, MO	W 25–20
September 28	East Tennessee State*	Bowling Green, KY	W 7–26
October 5	at Middle Tennessee	Murfreesboro, TN (rivalry)	L 7–26
October 12	at Youngstown State*	Youngstown, OH	W 9–6
October 19	Tennessee Tech	Bowling Green, KY	L 9-27
November 2	at Eastern Kentucky	Richmond, KY (rivalry)	L 0–28
November 9	Morehead State^{†}	Bowling Green, KY	W 28–6
November 16	Wittenberg*	Bowling Green, KY	W 28–13
November 23	Murray State	Bowling Green, KY (rivalry)	T 7–7
*Non-conference game; ^{†}Homecoming
