= 1957 Richmond Spiders football team =

American college football season

1957 Richmond Spiders football
- Conference: Southern Conference
- Record: 4–6 (2–4 SoCon)
- Head coach: Ed Merrick (7th season)
- Captains: Dick Eaton; Lewis St. Clair
- Home stadium: City Stadium

1957 Southern Conference football standings
	Conf.					Overall
Team	W		L		T	W		L		T
No. 20 VMI $	6	–	0	–	0	9	–	0	–	1
West Virginia	3	–	0	–	0	7	–	2	–	1
The Citadel	4	–	2	–	0	5	–	4	–	1
Furman	2	–	1	–	0	3	–	7	–	0
Richmond	2	–	4	–	0	4	–	6	–	0
William & Mary	2	–	4	–	0	4	–	6	–	0
Davidson	1	–	3	–	0	5	–	3	–	0
VPI	1	–	3	–	0	4	–	5	–	0
George Washington	1	–	5	–	0	2	–	7	–	0
Washington and Lee	0	–	0	–	0	0	–	8	–	0
$ – Conference champion; Rankings from AP Poll

The 1957 Richmond Spiders football team was an American football team that represented the University of Richmond as a member of the Southern Conference (SoCon) during the 1957 college football season. In their seventh season under head coach Ed Merrick, Richmond compiled a 4–6 record, with a mark of 2–4 in conference play, finishing tied for fifth place in the SoCon.

== Schedule ==
Date	Opponent	Site	Result	Attendance	Source
September 18	vs. East Carolina*	Portsmouth, VA	W 40–7	8,000	
September 21	Randolph–Macon*	City Stadium; Richmond, VA	W 40–0		
September 28	at Dayton*	UD Stadium; Dayton, OH	L 7–12	8,500	
October 5	VMI	City Stadium; Richmond, VA (rivalry)	L 6–28		
October 19	at The Citadel	Johnson Hagood Stadium; Charleston, SC	L 0–26		
October 26	at Rutgers*	Rutgers Stadium; Piscataway, NJ	L 13–26	5,000	
November 2	at VPI	Miles Stadium; Blacksburg, VA	L 7–42	5,500	
November 9	George Washington	City Stadium; Richmond, VA	W 13–6	5,000	
November 16	Davidson	City Stadium; Richmond, VA	L 19–23	1,000	
November 28	William & Mary	City Stadium; Richmond, VA (rivalry)	W 12–7	4,500	
*Non-conference game
