= 1957 West Virginia Mountaineers football team =

American college football season

1957 West Virginia Mountaineers football
- Conference: Southern Conference
- Record: 7–2–1 (3–0 SoCon)
- Head coach: Art Lewis (8th season)
- Home stadium: Mountaineer Field

1957 Southern Conference football standings
	Conf.					Overall
Team	W		L		T	W		L		T
No. 20 VMI $	6	–	0	–	0	9	–	0	–	1
West Virginia	3	–	0	–	0	7	–	2	–	1
The Citadel	4	–	2	–	0	5	–	4	–	1
Furman	2	–	1	–	0	3	–	7	–	0
Richmond	2	–	4	–	0	4	–	6	–	0
William & Mary	2	–	4	–	0	4	–	6	–	0
Davidson	1	–	3	–	0	5	–	3	–	0
VPI	1	–	3	–	0	4	–	5	–	0
George Washington	1	–	5	–	0	2	–	7	–	0
Washington and Lee	0	–	0	–	0	0	–	8	–	0
$ – Conference champion; Rankings from AP Poll

The 1957 West Virginia Mountaineers football team represented West Virginia University as a member of the Southern Conference (SoCon) during the 1957 college football season. Led by eighth-year head coach Art Lewis, the Mountaineers compiled an overall record of 7–2–1 with a mark of 3–0 in conference play, placing second in the SoCon.

== Schedule ==
Date	Opponent	Site	Result	Attendance	Source
September 21	Virginia*	Mountaineer Field; Morgantown, WV	T 6–6	23,000	
September 28	VPI	Mountaineer Field; Morgantown, WV (rivalry)	W 14–0	26,000	
October 5	at Wisconsin*	Camp Randall Stadium; Madison, WI	L 13–45	38,889	
October 12	at Boston University*	Boston University Field; Boston, MA	W 46–6		
October 18	at George Washington	Griffith Stadium; Washington, DC	W 34–14	8,000	
October 26	William & Mary	Mountaineer Field; Morgantown, WV	W 19–0	20,000	
November 2	at Penn State*	New Beaver Field; University Park, PA (rivalry)	L 6–27	28,712	
November 9	at Pittsburgh*	Pitt Stadium; Pittsburgh, PA (rivalry)	W 7–6		
November 16	at Wake Forest*	Bowman Gray Stadium; Winston-Salem, NC	W 27–14	5,000	
November 23	Syracuse*^{†}	Mountaineer Field; Morgantown, WV (rivalry)	W 7–0	26,000	
*Non-conference game; ^{†}Homecoming
