= 1957 Oklahoma Sooners football team =

American college football season

1957 Oklahoma Sooners football

Big 7 champion Orange Bowl champion

Orange Bowl, W 48–21 vs. Duke
- Conference: Big Seven Conference

Ranking
- Coaches: No. 4
- AP: No. 4
- Record: 10–1 (6–0 Big 7)
- Head coach: Bud Wilkinson (11th season)
- Captains: Don Stiller; Clendon Thomas
- Home stadium: Oklahoma Memorial Stadium

1957 Big Seven Conference football standings
	Conf.					Overall
Team	W		L		T	W		L		T
No. 4 Oklahoma $	6	–	0	–	0	10	–	1	–	0
Kansas	4	–	2	–	0	5	–	4	–	1
Missouri	3	–	3	–	0	5	–	4	–	1
Colorado	3	–	3	–	0	6	–	3	–	1
Iowa State	2	–	4	–	0	4	–	5	–	1
Kansas State	2	–	4	–	0	3	–	6	–	1
Nebraska	1	–	5	–	0	1	–	9	–	0
$ – Conference champion; Rankings from AP Poll

The 1957 Oklahoma Sooners football team represented the University of Oklahoma during the 1957 college football season. They played their home games at Oklahoma Memorial Stadium in Norman, Oklahoma, and were members of the Big Seven Conference. They were two-time defending national champions (1955, 1956), led by head coach Bud Wilkinson, in his eleventh season.

The Sooners won their first seven games in 1957, but were upset at home by unranked Notre Dame on November 16, stopping Oklahoma's record-breaking win streak at 47 games. It was their only loss of the season; they finished fourth in both final polls in early December, and won the Orange Bowl in January.

== Schedule ==
Date	Opponent	Rank	Site	TV	Result	Attendance	Source
September 21	at No. 8 Pittsburgh*	No. 1	Pitt Stadium; Pittsburgh, PA		W 26–0	58,942–59,025	
October 5	Iowa State	No. 1	Oklahoma Memorial Stadium; Norman, OK		W 40–14	53,392	
October 12	vs. Texas*	No. 1	Cotton Bowl; Dallas, TX (rivalry)	NBC	W 21–7	75,504	
October 19	Kansas	No. 2	Oklahoma Memorial Stadium; Norman, OK		W 47–0	50,000	
October 26	Colorado	No. 1	Oklahoma Memorial Stadium; Norman, OK	NBC	W 14–13	61,700	
November 2	at Kansas State	No. 2	Memorial Stadium; Manhattan, KS		W 13–0	15,000	
November 9	at No. 19 Missouri	No. 2	Memorial Stadium; Columbia, MO (rivalry)		W 39–14	39,500	
November 16	Notre Dame*	No. 2	Oklahoma Memorial Stadium; Norman, OK	NBC	L 0–7	62,000	
November 23	at Nebraska	No. 6	Memorial Stadium; Lincoln, NE (rivalry)		W 32–7	30,000	
November 30	Oklahoma State*	No. 5	Oklahoma Memorial Stadium; Norman, OK (Bedlam Series)		W 53–6	52,366	
January 1, 1958	vs. No. 16 Duke*	No. 4	Burdine Stadium; Miami, FL (Orange Bowl)	CBS	W 48–21	76,318	
*Non-conference game; Rankings from AP Poll released prior to the game; Source:

== Rankings ==
Ranking movements Legend: ██ Increase in ranking ██ Decrease in ranking ( ) = First-place votes
	Week											
Poll	Pre	1	2	3	4	5	6	7	8	9	10	Final
AP	1 (127)	1 (65)	1 (81)	1 (65)	2 (64)	1 (89)	2 (51)	2 (48)	2 (46)	6 (4)	5 (8)	4 (22)

== NFL draft ==
The following players were drafted into the National Football League following the season.

Round	Pick	Player	Position	NFL team
2	19	Clendon Thomas	Back	Los Angeles Rams
3	32	Bill Krisher	Guard	Pittsburgh Steelers
14	164	Doyle Jennings	Tackle	Pittsburgh Steelers
18	215	Dennit Morris	Back	San Francisco 49ers
