= 1957 William & Mary Indians football team =

American college football season

1957 William & Mary Indians football
- Conference: Southern Conference
- Record: 4–6 (2–4 SoCon)
- Head coach: Milt Drewer (1st season)
- Captains: Bill Rush; Larry Peccatiello
- Home stadium: Cary Field

1957 Southern Conference football standings
	Conf.					Overall
Team	W		L		T	W		L		T
No. 20 VMI $	6	–	0	–	0	9	–	0	–	1
West Virginia	3	–	0	–	0	7	–	2	–	1
The Citadel	4	–	2	–	0	5	–	4	–	1
Furman	2	–	1	–	0	3	–	7	–	0
Richmond	2	–	4	–	0	4	–	6	–	0
William & Mary	2	–	4	–	0	4	–	6	–	0
Davidson	1	–	3	–	0	5	–	3	–	0
VPI	1	–	3	–	0	4	–	5	–	0
George Washington	1	–	5	–	0	2	–	7	–	0
Washington and Lee	0	–	0	–	0	0	–	8	–	0
$ – Conference champion; Rankings from AP Poll

The 1957 William & Mary Indians football team represented William & Mary during the 1957 college football season. On November 9, 1957, William & Mary traveled to Raleigh, North Carolina to play #10 ranked NC State in Riddick Stadium. The Indians (2–5–0) stunned the Wolfpack (5–0–2) with a 7–6 win. The loss dropped NC State nine spots in the following AP Poll to #19. It marked the first time that William & Mary had ever defeated a national top 10 opponent

== Schedule ==
Date	Opponent	Site	Result	Attendance	Source
September 21	George Washington	Cary Field; Williamsburg, VA	L 0–7	8,000	
September 28	at No. 5 Navy*	Thompson Stadium; Annapolis, MD	L 6–33	15,000	
October 5	VPI	Cary Field; Williamsburg, VA	W 13–7	10,000	
October 12	at Penn State*	New Beaver Field; University Park, PA	L 13–21	29,800–30,462	
October 19	VMI	Cary Field; Williamsburg, VA (rivalry)	L 13–14		
October 26	at West Virginia	Mountaineer Field; Morgantown, WV	L 0–19	20,000	
November 2	at The Citadel	Johnson Hagood Stadium; Charleston, SC	W 14–12		
November 9	at No. 10 NC State*	Riddick Stadium; Raleigh, NC	W 7–6	11,000	
November 16	Rutgers*	Cary Field; Williamsburg, VA	W 38–7	9,000	
November 28	at Richmond	City Stadium; Richmond, VA (rivalry)	L 7–12	4,500	
*Non-conference game; Rankings from AP Poll released prior to the game

== NFL draft selections ==
= Pro Football Hall of Fame	= Canadian Football Hall of Fame	= College Football Hall of Fame

Year	Round	Pick	Overall	Name	Team	Position
1958	10	12	121	Elliot Schaubach	Detroit Lions	Tackle
