= 1957 Boston College Eagles football team =

American college football season

1957 Boston College Eagles football
- Conference: Independent
- Record: 7–2
- Head coach: Mike Holovak (7th season)
- Captain: Tom Sullivan
- Home stadium: Alumni Stadium

The 1957 Boston College Eagles football team represented Boston College as an independent during the 1957 college football season. In its seventh season under head coach Mike Holovak, the team compiled a 7–2 record and outscored opponents by a total of 158 to 129.

Alumni Stadium in Chestnut Hill, Massachusetts, was built prior to the 1957 season and was dedicated with the season opener on September 27. John F. Kennedy, then a U.S. Senator, arranged for the opening match-up against Navy. The Eagles' first victory in their new stadium came the following week against Florida State.

After losing the season opener, the team won seven consecutive games before losing the final game to rival Holy Cross. The Eagles tied a school record by losing eight fumbles in the loss to Holy Cross.

The team's statistical leaders included quarterback Don Allard with 910 passing yards, fullback Alan Miller with 484 rushing yards, and end Jim Colclough with 254 receiving yards and 42 points scored. Allard, Miller, and Colclough all went on to play in the American Football League or the National Football League. Guard Tom Meehan received the Thomas F. Scanlan Memorial Trophy as the senior player outstanding in scholarship, leadership, and athletic ability.

On October 19, the team set a single-game school record in limiting Villanova to 76 yards of total offense. That total remains tied for the fourth best single-game performance in school history.

== Schedule ==
Date	Opponent	Site	Result	Attendance	Source
September 21	No. 12 Navy	Alumni Stadium; Chestnut Hill, MA	L 6–46	28,000	
September 28	Florida State	Alumni Stadium; Chestnut Hill, MA	W 20–7	10,000	
October 5	Quantico Marines	Alumni Stadium; Chestnut Hill, MA	W 13–7	11,000	
October 12	Dayton	Alumni Stadium; Chestnut Hill, MA	W 41–14	12,000	
October 19	Villanova	Alumni Stadium; Chestnut Hill, MA	W 12–9	12,000	
October 26	at Detroit	University of Detroit Stadium; Detroit, MI	W 20–16	8,563	
November 9	at Boston University	Boston University Field; Boston, MA (rivalry)	W 27–2	25,500	
November 16	Marquette	Alumni Stadium; Chestnut Hill, MA	W 19–14	13,000	
November 30	at Holy Cross	Fitton Field; Worcester, MA (rivalry)	L 0–14	24,000	
Rankings from AP Poll released prior to the game
