= 1957 Penn State Nittany Lions football team =

American college football season

1957 Penn State Nittany Lions football
- Conference: Independent
- Record: 6–3
- Head coach: Rip Engle (8th season)
- Captain: Joe Sabol
- Home stadium: New Beaver Field

1957 Eastern major college football independents records
	Conf.			Overall
Team	W	L	T	W		L		T
No. 18 Army		–		7	–	2	–	0
Penn State		–		6	–	3	–	0
Boston University		–		5	–	3	–	0
Holy Cross		–		5	–	3	–	1
Syracuse		–		5	–	3	–	1
Pittsburgh		–		4	–	6	–	0
Colgate		–		3	–	6	–	0
Villanova		–		3	–	6	–	0
Rankings from AP poll

The 1957 Penn State Nittany Lions football team represented the Pennsylvania State University as an independent during the 1957 college football season. The team was coached by Rip Engle and played its home games in New Beaver Field in University Park, Pennsylvania.

== Schedule ==
Date	Opponent	Rank	Site	Result	Attendance	Source
September 28	at Penn	No. 19	Franklin Field; Philadelphia, PA	W 19–14	21,150	
October 5	No. 12 Army		New Beaver Field; University Park, PA	L 13–27	32,660	
October 12	William & Mary		New Beaver Field; University Park, PA	W 21–13	29,800–30,462	
October 19	Vanderbilt^{†}		New Beaver Field; University Park, PA	L 20–32	24,200–26,781	
October 26	at Syracuse		Archbold Stadium; Syracuse, NY (rivalry)	W 20–12	35,000	
November 2	West Virginia		New Beaver Field; University Park, PA (rivalry)	W 27–6	28,712	
November 9	at Marquette		Milwaukee County Stadium; Milwaukee, WI	W 20–7	4,700–4,719	
November 16	at Holy Cross		Fitton Field; Worcester, MA	W 14–10	18,000	
November 23	at Pittsburgh		Pitt Stadium; Pittsburgh, PA (rivalry)	L 13–14	44,710	
^{†}Homecoming; Rankings from AP Poll released prior to the game; Source:
