= 1957 Kansas State Wildcats football team =

American college football season

1957 Kansas State Wildcats football
- Conference: Big Seven Conference
- Record: 3–6–1 (2–4 Big 7)
- Head coach: Bus Mertes (3rd season)
- Home stadium: Memorial Stadium

1957 Big Seven Conference football standings
	Conf.					Overall
Team	W		L		T	W		L		T
No. 4 Oklahoma $	6	–	0	–	0	10	–	1	–	0
Kansas	4	–	2	–	0	5	–	4	–	1
Missouri	3	–	3	–	0	5	–	4	–	1
Colorado	3	–	3	–	0	6	–	3	–	1
Iowa State	2	–	4	–	0	4	–	5	–	1
Kansas State	2	–	4	–	0	3	–	6	–	1
Nebraska	1	–	5	–	0	1	–	9	–	0
$ – Conference champion; Rankings from AP Poll

The 1957 Kansas State Wildcats football team represented Kansas State University in the 1957 college football season. The team's head football coach was Bus Mertes. The Wildcats played their home games in Memorial Stadium. 1957 saw the Wildcats finish with a record of 3–6–1, and a 2–4 record in Big Seven Conference play. The Wildcats scored only 124 points while giving up 166. The finished tied for fifth in the Big Seven.

== Schedule ==
Date	Opponent	Site	Result	Attendance	Source
September 20	at Wyoming*	War Memorial Stadium; Laramie, WY	L 7–12	12,733	
September 28	BYU*	Memorial Stadium; Manhattan, KS	W 36–7	13,000	
October 5	Nebraska	Memorial Stadium; Manhattan, KS (rivalry)	L 7–14	14,000	
October 12	at Pacific (CA)*	Pacific Memorial Stadium; Stockton, CA	T 7–7	11,000	
October 19	Colorado^{†}	Memorial Stadium; Manhattan, KS (rivalry)	L 14–42	14,000	
October 26	at Iowa State	Clyde Williams Field; Ames, IA (rivalry)	W 14–10	17,000	
November 2	No. 2 Oklahoma	Memorial Stadium; Manhattan, KS	L 0–13	15,000	
November 9	at Kansas	Memorial Stadium; Lawrence, KS (rivalry)	L 7–13	26,000	
November 16	at Missouri	Memorial Stadium; Columbia, MO	W 23–21	20,000	
November 22	at No. 1 Michigan State*	Spartan Stadium; East Lansing, MI	L 21–27	35,989	
*Non-conference game; ^{†}Homecoming; Rankings from AP Poll released prior to the game; Source:
