= Bob Broome =

American football player and coach (1916–1959)

- Broome pictured in The Rhododendron 1959, Appalachian State yearbook

Biographical details
- Born: September 14, 1916; Greenville, South Carolina, U.S.
- Died: June 20, 1959 (aged 42); Durham, North Carolina, U.S.

Playing career

Football
- 1936–1939: Appalachian State
- Position(s): Fullback

Coaching career (HC unless noted)

Football
- 1956–1958: Appalachian State

Baseball
- 1949–1957: Appalachian State

Head coaching record
- Overall: 13–16 (football)

Robert William Broome (September 14, 1916 – June 20, 1959) was an American football player and coach of football and baseball. He served as the head football coach at Appalachian State Teachers College—now known as Appalachian State University—from 1956 to 1958, compiling a record of 13–16. Broome was also the head baseball coach at Appalachian State from 1959 to 1957.

== Head coaching record ==
=== Football ===
Year	Team	Overall	Conference	Standing	Bowl/playoffs
Appalachian State Mountaineers (North State Conference) (1956–1958)
1956	Appalachian State	3–6	3–3	3rd	
1957	Appalachian State	4–6	2–4	5th	
1958	Appalachian State	6–4	4–2	T–2nd	
Appalachian State:		13–16	9–9		
Total:		13–16			
