= Leroy Moore =

Leroy Moore may refer to:

- Leroy Moore (American football player) (born 1935), active 1961–1965
- Leroy Moore (coach) (1923–2012, American college football, college basketball, and track and field coach and university administrator
- Leroy F. Moore Jr. (born 1967), African American writer, poet, community activist, and feminist
