= Keith Smith (American football coach) =

American football coach

Coaching career (HC unless noted)
- 1956: Eastern Illinois

Head coaching record
- Overall: 2–7

Keith Smith was an American football coach. He was the 14th head football coach at Eastern Illinois State College—now known as Eastern Illinois University—in Charleston, Illinois, serving for one season, in 1956, and compiling a record of 2–7.

== Head coaching record ==
Year	Team	Overall	Conference	Standing	Bowl/playoffs
Eastern Illinois Panthers (Interstate Intercollegiate Athletic Conference) (1956)
1956	Eastern Illinois	2–7	2–4	6th	
Eastern Illinois:		2–7	2–4		
Total:		2–7			
