= 1956 New Haven State Owls football team =

American college football season

1956 New Haven State Owls football
- Conference: Independent
- Record: 9–0
- Head coach: Jess Dow (9th season)
- Home stadium: Bowen Field

The 1956 New Haven State Owls football team was an American football team that represented New Haven State Teachers College (now known as Southern Connecticut State University) as an independent during the 1956 NAIA football season. In their ninth season under head coach Jess Dow, the Owls compiled a 9–0 record. It remains the only perfect season in the history of the Southern Connecticut Owls football program. The team broke the school's single-game scoring record twice during the 1956 season, first with 50 points against the Quonset Naval Air Station and again the following week with 51 points against Brockport.

The team played its home games at Bowen Field in New Haven, Connecticut.

== Schedule ==
Date	Opponent	Site	Result	Attendance	Source
September 22	at Shippensburg	Shippensburg, PA	W 28–0		
September 29	at Drexel Tech	Drexel Field; Philadelphia, PA	W 28–19		
October 6	West Chester	Bowen Field; New Haven, CT	W 33–7		
October 13	at Brandeis	Gordon Field; Waltham, MA	W 46–7	2,000	
October 20	at New Britain Teachers	Arute Field; New Britain, CT	W 23–0	3,000	
October 27	Quonset NAS	Bowen Field; New Haven, CT	W 50–0		
November 3	Brockport	Bowen Field; New Haven, CT	W 51–0		
November 10	at American International	Springfield, MA	W 20–0		
November 17	at Bridgeport	Hedges Memorial Stadium; Bridgeport, CT	W 33–12		
