= Jess Dow =

American football player and coach (1916–2003)

Biographical details
- Born: December 16, 1916; Littlefield, Texas, U.S.
- Died: March 24, 2003 (aged 86); Orange, Connecticut, U.S.

Playing career

Football
- 1935–1937: West Texas A&M
- 1938–1940: Philadelphia Eagles
- Position: Fullback

Coaching career (HC unless noted)

Football
- 1948–1965: New Haven State / Southern Connecticut State

Basketball
- ?: New Haven State / Southern Connecticut State

Baseball
- ?: New Haven State / Southern Connecticut State

Golf
- ?: New Haven State / Southern Connecticut State

Administrative career (AD unless noted)
- 1948–1975: New Haven State / Southern Connecticut State

Head coaching record
- Overall: 107–41–6 (football)
- Tournaments: 0–1 (NAIA playoffs)

Accomplishments and honors

Championships
- 1 EFC (1965)
- College Football Hall of Fame; Inducted in 2013 (profile)

Jess Elwood "Woody" Dow (December 16, 1916 – March 24, 2003) was an American football player and coach. He played college football at West Texas State College—now West Texas A&M University—and then professionally with the Philadelphia Eagles of the National Football League (NFL). Dow served as the head football coach at Southern Connecticut State University—then known as New Haven State Teachers College and Southern Connecticut State College—from 1948 to 1965, compiling a record of 107–41–6. He was inducted into the College Football Hall of Fame as a coach in 2013.

Dow also coached basketball, baseball, and golf at Southern Connecticut State and was the school's athletic director from 1948 to 1975. He died on March 24, 2003, at his home in Orange, Connecticut.

== Head coaching record ==
=== Football ===
Year	Team	Overall	Conference	Standing	Bowl/playoffs	NAIA^{#}
New Haven State Owls (Independent) (1948–1957)
1948	New Haven State	3–4–1				
1949	New Haven State	8–1				
1950	New Haven State	6–1				
1951	New Haven State	6–1				
1952	New Haven State	5–3				
1953	New Haven State	5–1				
1954	New Haven State	4–3–1				
1955	New Haven State	7–1–1				
1956	New Haven State	9–0				
1957	New Haven State	5–2–2				
New Haven State / Southern Connecticut State Owls (NCAA College Division independent) (1958–1964)
1958	New Haven State	8–1				
1959	Southern Connecticut State	8–2			L NAIA Semifinal	8
1960	Southern Connecticut State	7–3				
1961	Southern Connecticut State	7–2				
1962	Southern Connecticut State	7–2				
1963	Southern Connecticut State	4–4				
1964	Southern Connecticut State	2–6–1				
New Haven State / Southern Connecticut State Owls (Eastern Football Conference) (1965)
1965	Southern Connecticut State	7–3	5–0	1st		
New Haven State / Southern Connecticut State:		107–41–6	5–0			
Total:		107–41–6				
National championship Conference title Conference division title or championship game berth
^{#}Rankings from NAIA poll.
