= 1956 Central Michigan Chippewas football team =

American college football season

1956 Central Michigan Chippewas football

IIAC champion
- Conference: Interstate Intercollegiate Athletic Conference
- Record: 9–0 (6–0 IIAC)
- Head coach: Kenneth Kelly (6th season)
- MVP: Oliver Porter
- Home stadium: Alumni Field

1956 Interstate Intercollegiate Athletic Conference football standings
	Conf.					Overall
Team	W		L		T	W		L		T
Central Michigan $	6	–	0	–	0	9	–	0	–	0
Western Illinois	4	–	2	–	0	6	–	3	–	0
Eastern Michigan	3	–	3	–	0	4	–	4	–	0
Illinois State Normal	3	–	3	–	0	4	–	4	–	1
Southern Illinois	3	–	3	–	0	4	–	5	–	0
Eastern Illinois	2	–	4	–	0	2	–	7	–	0
Northern Illinois State	0	–	6	–	0	1	–	8	–	0
$ – Conference champion

The 1956 Central Michigan Chippewas football team was an American football team that represented Central Michigan College, renamed Central Michigan University in 1959, in the Interstate Intercollegiate Athletic Conference during the 1956 college football season. In their sixth season under head coach Kenneth Kelly, the Chippewas compiled a perfect 9–0 record, won the Interstate Intercollegiate Athletic Conference (IIAC) championship for the fifth consecutive year, and outscored their opponents by a combined total of 313 to 92. The team set multiple school records that still stand, including allowing 797 rushing yards (88.5 yards per game) and allowing only 1,292 net yards. The 1956 season was part of the longest winning streak in school history, 15 games running from October 8, 1955, to November 10, 1956.

The team's statistical leaders included quarterback Herb Kipke with 490 passing yards (36 of 68 passing) and halfback Jim Podoley with 655 rushing yards (100 carries) and 211 receiving yards (11 receptions).

Podoley set three Central Michigan records in 1956 that still stand. The first and second are his six touchdowns and 36 points scored against Eastern Illinois in his final college game on November 10, 1956, and the third is his season average of 29.0 yards per punt return. In his final home game on November 3, 1956, Podoley ran for a touchdown and passed for another in a 19-0 victory over Eastern Michigan. Podoley played for Central Michigan from 1953 to 1956, and his jersey (No. 62) is the only number retired in Central Michigan football history. He was inducted into the Central Michigan Athletic Hall of Fame in 1984.

Tackle Oliver Porter received the team's most valuable player award. Five Central Michigan players (Kipke, Podoley, end Tim Burdon, fullback Bob McNamara, and tackle Oliver Porter) received first-team honors on the All-IIAC team.

== Schedule ==
Date	Opponent	Site	Result	Source
September 15	vs. Bradley*	Arthur Hill Stadium; Saginaw, MI	W 38–33	
September 22	at Western Michigan*	Waldo Stadium; Kalamazoo, MI (rivalry)	W 14–7	
September 29	Southern Illinois	Alumni Field; Mount Pleasant, MI	W 32–13	
October 6	at Northern Illinois	Glidden Field; DeKalb, IL	W 41–0	
October 13	at Western Illinois	Hanson Field; Macomb, IL	W 44–20	
October 20	Illinois State Normal^{†}	Alumni Field; Mount Pleasant, MI	W 20–0	
October 27	Milwaukee*	Alumni Field; Mount Pleasant, MI	W 67–12	
November 3	Eastern Michigan	Alumni Field; Mount Pleasant, MI (rivalry)	W 19–0	
November 10	at Eastern Illinois	Lincoln Field; Charleston, IL	W 38–7	
*Non-conference game; ^{†}Homecoming
