= 1956 Temple Owls football team =

American college football season

1956 Temple Owls football
- Conference: Independent
- Record: 3–5
- Head coach: Peter P. Stevens (1st season)
- Home stadium: Temple Stadium

1956 Eastern non-major college football independents records
	Conf.			Overall
Team	W	L	T	W		L		T
Alfred		–		8	–	0	–	0
Hofstra		–		7	–	3	–	0
Franklin & Marshall		–		5	–	2	–	1
Buffalo		–		5	–	3	–	0
Drexel		–		5	–	3	–	0
Washington & Jefferson		–		3	–	4	–	1
Bucknell		–		3	–	5	–	0
Carnegie Tech		–		3	–	5	–	0
Temple		–		3	–	5	–	0

The 1956 Temple Owls football team was an American football team that represented Temple University as an independent during the 1956 college football season. In its first season under head coach Peter P. Stevens, the team compiled a 3–5 record. The team played its home games at Temple Stadium in Philadelphia.

== Schedule ==
Date	Opponent	Site	Result	Attendance	Source
September 29	at Lafayette	Fisher Field; Easton, PA	L 0–20		
October 6	at Muhlenberg	Muhlenberg Field; Allentown, PA	W 19–14	2,000	
October 13	Scranton	Temple Stadium; Philadelphia, PA	W 28–20	1,617	
October 20	Carnegie Tech	Temple Stadium; Philadelphia, PA	W 27–12	6,100	
October 27	Bucknell	Temple Stadium; Philadelphia, PA	L 6–12	7,047	
November 3	Lehigh	Temple Stadium; Philadelphia, PA	L 0–21	6,200	
November 10	Gettysburg	Temple Stadium; Philadelphia, PA	L 7–13	4,500	
November 17	at Delaware	Delaware Stadium; Newark, DE	L 7–14	2,500	
