= 1956 Eastern Michigan Hurons football team =

American college football season

1956 Eastern Michigan Hurons football
- Conference: Interstate Intercollegiate Athletic Conference
- Record: 4–4 (3–3 IIAC)
- Head coach: Fred Trosko (5th season)
- MVP: Thomas McCormick
- Captain: Thomas McCormick
- Home stadium: Briggs Field

1956 Interstate Intercollegiate Athletic Conference football standings
	Conf.					Overall
Team	W		L		T	W		L		T
Central Michigan $	6	–	0	–	0	9	–	0	–	0
Western Illinois	4	–	2	–	0	6	–	3	–	0
Eastern Michigan	3	–	3	–	0	4	–	4	–	0
Illinois State Normal	3	–	3	–	0	4	–	4	–	1
Southern Illinois	3	–	3	–	0	4	–	5	–	0
Eastern Illinois	2	–	4	–	0	2	–	7	–	0
Northern Illinois State	0	–	6	–	0	1	–	8	–	0
$ – Conference champion

The 1956 Eastern Michigan Hurons football team represented Eastern Michigan College (renamed Eastern Michigan University in 1959) in the Interstate Intercollegiate Athletic Conference (IIAC) during the 1956 college football season. In their fifth season under head coach Fred Trosko, the Hurons compiled a 4–4 record (3–3 against IIAC opponents) and outscored their opponents, 158 to 84. On October 27, 1956, the team set an IIAC scoring record with 10 touchdowns in a 65-0 victory over Eastern Illinois. Thomas O. McCormick was the team captain. McCormick also received the team's most valuable player award. Kerry Keating led the team with 417 yards of total offense, 417 rushing yards, 126 receiving yards, seven touchdowns, and 42 points scored. Herman Carroll led in passing with 413 passing yards.

== Schedule ==
Date	Opponent	Site	Result	Source
September 22	at Hillsdale*	Hillsdale, MI	L 7–16	
September 29	Baldwin–Wallace*	Briggs Field; Ypsilanti, MI	W 26–0	
October 6	Western Illinois	Briggs Field; Ypsilanti, MI	W 21–6	
October 13	at Illinois State Normal	McCormick Field; Normal, IL	L 7–22	
October 20	at Southern Illinois	McAndrew Stadium; Carbondale, IL	L 7–14	
October 27	Eastern Illinois ^{†}	Briggs Field; Ypsilanti, MI	W 65–0	
November 3	at Central Michigan	Alumni Field; Mount Pleasant, MI (rivalry)	L 0–19	
November 10	at Northern Illinois State	Glidden Field; DeKalb, IL	W 25–7	
*Non-conference game; ^{†}Homecoming
