= Leroy Moore (coach) =

American football coach (1923–2012)

Biographical details
- Born: October 4, 1923; Muskogee, Oklahoma, U.S.
- Died: January 15, 2012 (aged 88)

Playing career

Football
- c. 1947: Langston

Basketball
- c. 1947: Langston

Coaching career (HC unless noted)

Football
- c. 1950: Douglass HS (OK) (assistant)
- 1953–1956: Arkansas AM&N

Basketball
- 1953–1956: Arkansas AM&N
- 1956–1963: Prairie View
- 1964–1969: Prairie View

Track and field
- c. 1950: Douglass HS (OK)
- c. 1960: Prairie View

Head coaching record
- Overall: 9–26–5 (college football)

Leroy G. Moore Jr. (October 4, 1923 – January 15, 2012) was an American college football, college basketball, and track and field coach and university professor and administrator. He served as the head football coach at Arkansas Agricultural, Mechanical & Normal College Arkansas (AM&N)—now known as the University of Arkansas at Pine Bluff—from 1953 to 1956, compiling a record of 9–26–5.

Moore was born on October 23, 1923, in Muskogee, Oklahoma. He attended public school in Langston, Oklahoma and then played football and basketball at Langston University on teams coached by Caesar Felton Gayles. He earned a Bachelor of Arts from Langston and received a Master of Arts in physical education from Colorado State College of Education at Greeley—now known as University of Northern Colorado. He was an assistant football coach and head track coach at Douglass High School in Oklahoma City. Moore was hired as the head football coach at AM&N in 1953, succeeding Roland K. Bernard. He was also the head basketball coach at Arkansas AM&N before resigning in 1956 to take the same post at Prairie View A&M College of Texas—now known as Prairie View A&M University. At Prairie View, he also coached the track team and was an assistant professor in the department of physical education. He received a Doctor of Education degree from Colorado State—Greeley in 1968. Moore stepped down as basketball coach at Prairie View in 1969 to return to Arkansas AM&N as dean of students.

Moore died on January 15, 2012.

== Head coaching record ==
=== College football ===
Year	Team	Overall	Conference	Standing	Bowl/playoffs
Arkansas AM&N Golden Lions (Southwest Athletic Conference) (1953–1956)
1953	Arkansas AM&N	3–5–2	2–3–1	4th	
1954	Arkansas AM&N	2–7–2	1–5	6th	
1955	Arkansas AM&N	2–8	2–5	T–5th	
1956	Arkansas AM&N	2–6–1	0–5–1	T–6th	
Arkansas AM&N:		9–26–5	5–18–2		
Total:		9–26–5			
