= 1956 Southern Jaguars football team =

American college football season

1956 Southern Jaguars football
- Conference: Southwestern Athletic Conference
- Record: 5–5 (4–2 SWAC)
- Head coach: Ace Mumford (21st season)
- Home stadium: Municipal Stadium; University Stadium

1956 Southwestern Athletic Conference football standings
	Conf.					Overall
Team	W		L		T	W		L		T
Texas Southern +	5	–	1	–	0	9	–	2	–	0
Wiley +	5	–	1	–	0	6	–	3	–	1
Southern	4	–	2	–	0	5	–	5	–	0
Prairie View A&M	4	–	2	–	0	5	–	5	–	0
Langston	2	–	4	–	0	3	–	7	–	0
Arkansas AM&N	0	–	5	–	1	2	–	6	–	1
Texas College	0	–	5	–	1	2	–	6	–	1
+ – Conference co-champions

The 1956 Southern Jaguars football team was an American football team that represented Southern University as a member of the Southwestern Athletic Conference (SWAC) during the 1956 college football season. Led by Ace Mumford in his 21st season as head coach, the Jaguars compiled an overall record of 5–5, with a mark of 4–2 in conference play, and finished tied for third in the SWAC.

== Schedule ==
Date	Opponent	Site	Result	Source
September 22	vs. Texas Southern	Public School Stadium; Galveston, TX	L 7–19	
September 29	at Alcorn A&M*	Henderson Stadium; Lorman, MS	W 26–13	
October 6	Xavier (LA)*	Municipal Stadium; Baton Rouge, LA (Pelican State Classic)	L 13–14	
October 13	at Arkansas AM&N	Pumphrey Stadium; Pine Bluff, AR	W 16–12	
October 20	Langston	University Stadium; Baton Rouge, LA	W 8–0	
October 27	at Texas College	Steer Stadium; Tyler, TX	W 39–20	
November 3	at Tennessee A&I*	Hale Stadium; Nashville, TN	L 6–52	
November 10	Wiley	Municipal Stadium; Baton Rouge, LA	W 20–13	
November 17	Florida A&M*	Municipal Stadium; Baton Rouge, LA	L 6–34	
November 24	at Prairie View A&M	Blackshear Field; Prairie View, TX	L 6–14	
*Non-conference game
