= 1956 Wiley Wildcats football team =

American college football season

1956 Wiley Wildcats football

SWAC co-champion
- Conference: Southwestern Athletic Conference
- Record: 6–3–1 (5–1 SWAC)
- Head coach: Fred T. Long (26th season)
- Home stadium: Wiley Field

1956 Southwestern Athletic Conference football standings
	Conf.					Overall
Team	W		L		T	W		L		T
Texas Southern +	5	–	1	–	0	9	–	2	–	0
Wiley +	5	–	1	–	0	6	–	3	–	1
Southern	4	–	2	–	0	5	–	5	–	0
Prairie View A&M	4	–	2	–	0	5	–	5	–	0
Langston	2	–	4	–	0	3	–	7	–	0
Arkansas AM&N	0	–	5	–	1	2	–	6	–	1
Texas College	0	–	5	–	1	2	–	6	–	1
+ – Conference co-champions

The 1956 Wiley Wildcats football team represented Wiley College as a member of the Southwestern Athletic Conference (SWAC) during the 1956 college football season. Led by 26th-year head coach Fred T. Long, the Wildcats compiled an overall record of 6–3–1, with a conference record of 5–1, and finished as SWAC co-champion.

== Schedule ==
Date	Opponent	Site	Result	Source
September 29	at Texas Southern	Public School Stadium; Houston, TX	W 6–0	
October 6	Arkansas AM&N	Wiley Field; Marshall, TX	W 20–13	
October 13	vs. Grambling*	Dal-Hi Stadium; Dallas, TX	L 20–51	
October 20	at Alcorn A&M*	Henderson Stadium; Lorman, MS	L 14–18	
October 27	at Bishop*	Tiger Field; Marshall, TX	W 61–0	
November 3	Langston^{†}	Wiley Field; Marshall, TX	W 12–2	
November 10	at Southern	Municipal Stadium; Baton Rouge, LA	L 13–20	
November 17	at Jackson*	Alumni Stadium; Jackson, MS	T 20–20	
November 24	at Texas College	Steer Stadium; Tyler, TX	W 20–13	
December 1	vs. Prairie View A&M	State Fair Stadium; Shreveport, LA	W 27–0	
*Non-conference game; ^{†}Homecoming
