= 1956 Bucknell Bison football team =

American college football season

1956 Bucknell Bison football
- Conference: Independent
- Record: 3–5
- Head coach: Harry Lawrence (11th season)
- Captains: Don Koppes; Ralph Riker
- Home stadium: Memorial Stadium

1956 Eastern non-major college football independents records
	Conf.			Overall
Team	W	L	T	W		L		T
Alfred		–		8	–	0	–	0
Hofstra		–		7	–	3	–	0
Franklin & Marshall		–		5	–	2	–	1
Buffalo		–		5	–	3	–	0
Drexel		–		5	–	3	–	0
Washington & Jefferson		–		3	–	4	–	1
Bucknell		–		3	–	5	–	0
Carnegie Tech		–		3	–	5	–	0
Temple		–		3	–	5	–	0

The 1956 Bucknell Bison football team was an American football team that represented Bucknell University as an independent during the 1956 college football season.

In its 11th season under head coach Harry Lawrence, the team compiled a 3–5 record. Don Koppes and Ralph Riker were the team captains.

The team played its home games at Memorial Stadium on the university campus in Lewisburg, Pennsylvania.

== Schedule ==
Date	Opponent	Site	Result	Attendance	Source
September 22	at Albright	Albright College Stadium; Reading, PA	W 13–0	5,000	
September 29	vs. Gettysburg	Hershey Stadium; Hershey, PA (Rotary Bowl)	W 17–7	8,000	
October 6	Lehigh	Memorial Stadium; Lewisburg, PA	L 6–25	5,000	
October 13	at Delaware	Delaware Stadium; Newark, DE	L 7–26	6,500	
October 20	Lafayette^{†}	Memorial Stadium; Lewisburg, PA	L 7–13	7,000	
October 27	at Temple	Temple Stadium; Philadelphia, PA	W 12–6	7,047	
November 3	Buffalo	Memorial Stadium; Lewisburg, PA	L 13–31	3,500	
November 10	at Colgate	Colgate Athletic Field; Hamilton, NY	L 12–26		
^{†}Homecoming
