= 1956 Southern Illinois Salukis football team =

American college football season

1956 Southern Illinois Salukis football
- Conference: Interstate Intercollegiate Athletic Conference
- Record: 4–5 (3–3 IIAC)
- Head coach: Albert Kawal (2nd season)
- Home stadium: McAndrew Stadium

1956 Interstate Intercollegiate Athletic Conference football standings
	Conf.					Overall
Team	W		L		T	W		L		T
Central Michigan $	6	–	0	–	0	9	–	0	–	0
Western Illinois	4	–	2	–	0	6	–	3	–	0
Eastern Michigan	3	–	3	–	0	4	–	4	–	0
Illinois State Normal	3	–	3	–	0	4	–	4	–	1
Southern Illinois	3	–	3	–	0	4	–	5	–	0
Eastern Illinois	2	–	4	–	0	2	–	7	–	0
Northern Illinois State	0	–	6	–	0	1	–	8	–	0
$ – Conference champion

The 1956 Southern Illinois Salukis football team was an American football team that represented Southern Illinois University (now known as Southern Illinois University Carbondale) in the Interstate Intercollegiate Athletic Conference (IIAC) during the 1956 college football season. Under second-year head coach Albert Kawal, the team compiled a 4–5 record. The team played its home games at McAndrew Stadium in Carbondale, Illinois.

== Schedule ==
Date	Opponent	Site	Result	Source
September 22	Illinois Wesleyan*	McAndrew Stadium; Carbondale, IL	W 40–0	
September 29	at Central Michigan	Alumni Field; Mount Pleasant, MI	L 13–32	
October 4	at Bradley*	Peoria Stadium; Peoria, IL	L 20–26	
October 13	at Eastern Illinois	Lincoln Field; Charleston, IL	W 33–0	
October 20	Eastern Michigan	McAndrew Stadium; Carbondale, IL	W 14–7	
October 27	Western Illinois	McAndrew Stadium; Carbondale, IL	L 7–21	
November 3	at Washington University*	Francis Field; St. Louis, MO	L 0–26	
November 10	Illinois State Normal	McAndrew Stadium; Carbondale, IL	L 13–27	
November 17	at Northern Illinois	Glidden Field; DeKalb, IL	W 28–13	
*Non-conference game
