= 1956 Arkansas AM&N Golden Lions football team =

American college football season

1956 Arkansas AM&N Golden Lions football
- Conference: Southwestern Athletic Conference
- Record: 2–6–1 (0–5–1 SWAC)
- Head coach: Leroy Moore (4th season)
- Home stadium: Pumphrey Stadium

1956 Southwestern Athletic Conference football standings
	Conf.					Overall
Team	W		L		T	W		L		T
Texas Southern +	5	–	1	–	0	9	–	2	–	0
Wiley +	5	–	1	–	0	6	–	3	–	1
Southern	4	–	2	–	0	5	–	5	–	0
Prairie View A&M	4	–	2	–	0	5	–	5	–	0
Langston	2	–	4	–	0	3	–	7	–	0
Arkansas AM&N	0	–	5	–	1	2	–	6	–	1
Texas College	0	–	5	–	1	2	–	6	–	1
+ – Conference co-champions

The 1956 Arkansas AM&N Golden Lions football team represented the Arkansas Agricultural, Mechanical and Normal College (now known as the University of Arkansas at Pine Bluff) as a member of the Southwestern Athletic Conference (SWAC) during the 1956 college football season. Led by Leroy Moore in his fourth and final season as head coach, the Golden Lions compiled an overall record of 2–6–1, with a conference record of 0–5–1, and finished tied for sixth in the SWAC.

== Schedule ==
Date	Opponent	Site	Result	Source
September 22	at Lincoln (MO)*	Lincoln Field; Jefferson City, MO	L 9–13	
September 29	at Texas College	Steer Stadium; Tyler, TX	T 14–14	
October 6	at Wiley	Wiley Field; Marshall, TX	L 13–20	
October 13	Southern	Pumphrey Stadium; Pine Bluff, AR	L 12–16	
October 20	Mississippi Industrial*	Pumphrey Stadium; Pine Bluff, AR	W 31–6	
October 27	at Prairie View A&M	Blackshear Field; Prairie View, TX	L 6–43	
November 3	Alcorn A&M*	Pumphrey Stadium; Pine Bluff, AR	W 12–8	
November 10	at Langston	Anderson Stadium; Langston, OK	L 6–19	
November 17	Texas Southern	Pumphrey Stadium; Pine Bluff, AR	L 6–26	
*Non-conference game
