= 1956 Grambling Tigers football team =

American college football season

1956 Grambling Tigers football
- Conference: Midwest Athletic Association
- Record: 8–1 (1–1 MWAA)
- Head coach: Eddie Robinson (14th season)
- Home stadium: Tiger Stadium

1956 Midwest Athletic Association football standings
	Conf.					Overall
Team	W		L		T	W		L		T
No. 1 Tennessee A&I $	4	–	0	–	0	10	–	0	–	0
No. 3 Grambling	1	–	1	–	0	8	–	1	–	0
No. 7 Jackson State	1	–	1	–	0	6	–	2	–	2
No. 14 Central State (OH)	1	–	1	–	1	4	–	3	–	1
Lincoln (MO)	1	–	2	–	0	5	–	4	–	0
Kentucky State	0	–	3	–	1	3	–	5	–	1
$ – Conference champion; Rankings from Pittsburgh Courier

The 1956 Grambling Tigers football team represented Grambling College (now known as Grambling State University) as a member of the Midwest Athletic Association (MWAA) during the 1956 college football season. Led by 14th-year head coach Eddie Robinson, the Tigers compiled an overall record of 8–1 and a mark of 1–1 in conference play.

== Schedule ==
Date	Opponent	Site	Result	Source
September 15	Paul Quinn*	Tiger Stadium; Grambling, LA	W 43–6	
September 22	Alcorn A&M*	Tiger Stadium; Grambling, LA	W 33–12	
October 6	at Tennessee A&I	Hale Stadium; Nashville, TN	L 0–33	
October 13	vs. Wiley*	Dal-Hi Stadium; Dallas, TX	W 51–20	
October 22	vs. Morris Brown*	State Fair Stadium; Shreveport, LA	W 34–12	
October 27	Jackson State	Tiger Stadium; Grambling, LA	W 26–7	
November 3	vs. Bethune–Cookman*	Phillips Field; Tampa, FL	W 27–7	
November 10	Prairie View A&M*	Tiger Stadium; Grambling, LA	W 46–0	
November 17	Bluefield State*	Tiger Stadium; Grambling, LA	W 52–0	
*Non-conference game
