= 1956 Lehigh Engineers football team =

American college football season

1956 Lehigh Engineers football

Middle Three champion
- Conference: Middle Three Conference
- Record: 7–2 (2–0 Middle Three)
- Head coach: Bill Leckonby (11th season)
- Captain: Alex Maslowsky
- Home stadium: Taylor Stadium

1956 Middle Three Conference football standings
	Conf.					Overall
Team	W		L		T	W		L		T
Lehigh $	2	–	0	–	0	7	–	2	–	0
Rutgers	1	–	1	–	0	3	–	7	–	0
Lafayette	0	–	2	–	0	6	–	3	–	0
$ – Conference champion

The 1956 Lehigh Engineers football team was an American football team that represented Lehigh University during the 1956 college football season. Lehigh won the Middle Three Conference championship.

In their 11th year under head coach Bill Leckonby, the Engineers compiled a 7–2 record and defeated both Middle Three Conference opponents. Alex Maslowsky was the team captain.

Lehigh played its home games at Taylor Stadium on the university's main campus in Bethlehem, Pennsylvania.

== Schedule ==
Date	Opponent	Site	Result	Attendance	Source
September 22	Gettysburg*	Taylor Stadium; Bethlehem, PA	W 26–7	5,000	
September 29	Delaware*	Taylor Stadium; Bethlehem, PA (rivalry)	L 7–33	3,500	
October 6	at Bucknell*	Memorial Stadium; Lewisburg, PA	W 25–6	5,000	
October 13	at VMI*	Alumni Field; Lexington, VA	W 27–20	4,500	
October 20	Virginia*	Taylor Stadium; Bethlehem, PA	L 12–24	9,000	
October 27	Rutgers	Taylor Stadium; Bethlehem, PA	W 27–13	5,000	
November 3	at Temple*	Temple Stadium; Philadelphia, PA	W 21–0	6,200	
November 10	Albright*	Taylor Stadium; Bethlehem, PA	W 34–14	4,500	
November 17	at Lafayette	Fisher Field; Easton, PA (The Rivalry)	W 27–10	19,000	
*Non-conference game
