= 1956 Rutgers Scarlet Knights football team =

American college football season

1956 Rutgers Scarlet Knights football
- Conference: Middle Three Conference
- Record: 3–7 (1–1 Middle Three)
- Head coach: John Stiegman (1st season)
- Captains: John Laverty; Arthur Robinson
- Home stadium: Rutgers Stadium

1956 Middle Three Conference football standings
	Conf.					Overall
Team	W		L		T	W		L		T
Lehigh $	2	–	0	–	0	7	–	2	–	0
Rutgers	1	–	1	–	0	3	–	7	–	0
Lafayette	0	–	2	–	0	6	–	3	–	0
$ – Conference champion

The 1956 Rutgers Scarlet Knights football team represented Rutgers University in the 1956 college football season. In their first season under head coach John Stiegman, the Scarlet Knights compiled a 3–7 record and were outscored by their opponents 240 to 117. The team's statistical leaders included William Gatyas with 450 passing yards, Billy Austin 380 rushing yards and Jay Hunton with 408 receiving yards.

== Schedule ==
Date	Opponent	Site	Result	Attendance	Source
September 22	Ohio Wesleyan*	Rutgers Stadium; Piscataway, NJ	W 33–13	6,000	
September 29	at Princeton*	Palmer Stadium; Princeton, NJ (rivalry)	L 6–28	26,000	
October 6	at Connecticut*	Memorial Stadium; Storrs, CT	L 7–27	7,429	
October 13	Colgate*	Rutgers Stadium; Piscataway, NJ	L 6–48	11,000	
October 20	Boston College*	Rutgers Stadium; Piscataway, NJ	L 0–32	8,500	
October 27	at Lehigh	Taylor Stadium; Bethlehem, PA	L 13–27	5,000	
November 3	Lafayette	Rutgers Stadium; Piscataway, NJ	W 20–19	5,000	
November 10	at Delaware*	Delaware Stadium; Newark, DE	L 0–22	5,000	
November 17	William & Mary*	Rutgers Stadium; Piscataway, NJ	W 20–6	3,000	
November 24	Columbia*	Rutgers Stadium; Piscataway, NJ	L 12–18	9,000	
*Non-conference game
