= 1956 Alfred Saxons football team =

American college football season

1956 Alfred Saxons football
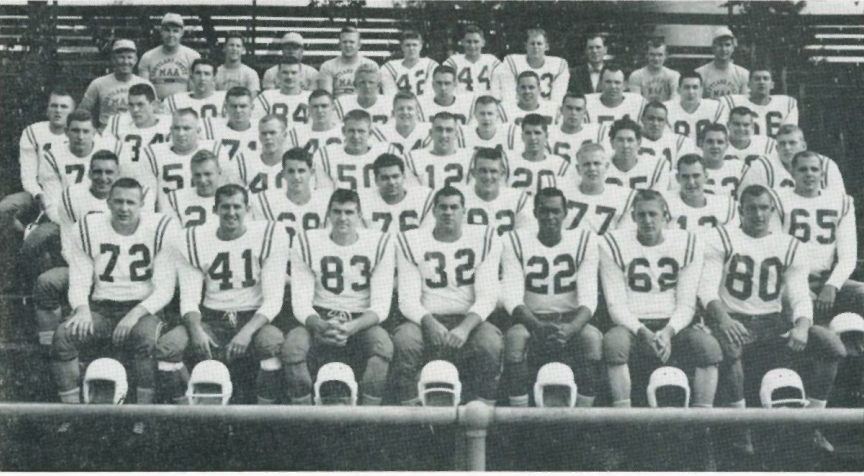
- Conference: Independent
- Record: 7–0
- Head coach: Alex Yunevich (16th season)
- Home stadium: Merrill Field

1956 Eastern non-major college football independents records
| | Conf. | | | Overall |
| Team | W | L | T | W | | L | | T |
|---|---|---|---|---|---|---|---|---|
| Alfred | | – | | 8 | – | 0 | – | 0 |
| Hofstra | | – | | 7 | – | 3 | – | 0 |
| Franklin & Marshall | | – | | 5 | – | 2 | – | 1 |
| Buffalo | | – | | 5 | – | 3 | – | 0 |
| Drexel | | – | | 5 | – | 3 | – | 0 |
| Washington & Jefferson | | – | | 3 | – | 4 | – | 1 |
| Bucknell | | – | | 3 | – | 5 | – | 0 |
| Carnegie Tech | | – | | 3 | – | 5 | – | 0 |
| Temple | | – | | 3 | – | 5 | – | 0 |

The 1956 Alfred Saxons football team was an American football team that represented Alfred University as an independent during the 1956 college football season. In their 16th season under head coach Alex Yunevich, the Saxons compiled a perfect 7–0 record, shut out six of eight opponents, and outscored all opponents by a total of 245 to 69.

Alfred had back-to-back perfect seasons in 1955 and 1956. End Charlie Shultz was selected as a first-team player on the 1956 Little All-America college football team.

The team played its home games at Merrill Field in Alfred, New York.

== Schedule ==
| Date | Opponent | Site | Result | Attendance | Source |
|---|---|---|---|---|---|
| September 29 | at Cortland | Cortland, NY | W 24–6 | | |
| October 6 | Merchant Marine | Merrill Field; Alfred, NY | W 53–6 | | |
| October 13 | at St. Lawrence | Canton, NY | W 44–14 | | |
| October 20 | Ithaca | Merrill Field; Alfred, NY | W 46–12 | 5,500 | |
| October 27 | at Buffalo | Rotary Field; Buffalo, NY | W 26–19 | 9,000 | |
| November 3 | American International | Merrill Field; Alfred, NY | W 25–12 | 4,700 | |
| November 10 | at Brockport | Brockport, NY | W 27–0 | | |
