= 1956 Akron Zips football team =

American college football season

1956 Akron Zips football
- Conference: Ohio Athletic Conference
- Record: 3–5–1 (3–5–1 OAC)
- Head coach: Joe McMullen (3rd season)
- Captains: Jerry Reeves; John Williams
- Home stadium: Rubber Bowl

1956 Ohio Athletic Conference football standings
| | Conf. | | | | | Overall |
| Team | W | | L | | T | W | | L | | T |
|---|---|---|---|---|---|---|---|---|---|---|
| Heidelberg $ | 5 | – | 1 | – | 0 | 8 | – | 1 | – | 0 |
| Hiram | 4 | – | 1 | – | 0 | 5 | – | 3 | – | 0 |
| Denison | 5 | – | 2 | – | 0 | 7 | – | 2 | – | 0 |
| Muskingum | 5 | – | 2 | – | 1 | 5 | – | 2 | – | 1 |
| Wittenberg | 5 | – | 2 | – | 1 | 5 | – | 2 | – | 1 |
| Capital | 4 | – | 2 | – | 1 | 5 | – | 2 | – | 1 |
| Wooster | 4 | – | 3 | – | 1 | 5 | – | 3 | – | 1 |
| Otterbein | 3 | – | 4 | – | 0 | 4 | – | 5 | – | 0 |
| Akron | 3 | – | 5 | – | 1 | 3 | – | 5 | – | 1 |
| Kenyon | 1 | – | 3 | – | 1 | 1 | – | 5 | – | 1 |
| Mount Union | 2 | – | 5 | – | 0 | 2 | – | 6 | – | 0 |
| Oberlin | 1 | – | 4 | – | 1 | 1 | – | 6 | – | 1 |
| Ohio Wesleyan | 1 | – | 4 | – | 1 | 1 | – | 7 | – | 1 |
| Marietta | 0 | – | 5 | – | 0 | 0 | – | 7 | – | 0 |
$ – Conference champion

The 1956 Akron Zips football team was an American football team that represented the University of Akron in the Ohio Athletic Conference (OAC) during the 1956 college football season. In its third season under head coach Joe McMullen, the team compiled a 3–5–1 record (3–5–1 against OAC opponents) and outscored opponents by a total of 216 to 171. Jerry Reeves and John Williams the team captains. The team played its home games at the Rubber Bowl in Akron, Ohio.

== Schedule ==
| Date | Opponent | Site | Result | Attendance | Source |
|---|---|---|---|---|---|
| September 22 | Wittenberg | Rubber Bowl; Akron, OH | L 14–34 | 28,694 | |
| September 29 | at Muskingum | New Concord, OH | T 28–28 | | |
| October 6 | Otterbein | Rubber Bowl; Akron, OH | L 7–13 | | |
| October 13 | at Ohio Wesleyan | Delaware, OH | L 27–33 | | |
| October 20 | at Capital | Columbus, OH | W 35–6 | | |
| October 27 | Wooster^{†} | Rubber Bowl; Akron, OH | L 17–20 | | |
| November 3 | at Oberlin | Oberlin, OH | W 40–14 | | |
| November 10 | at Mount Union | Alliance, OH | W 41–6 | | |
| November 17 | Heidelberg | Rubber Bowl; Akron, OH | L 7–17 | 3,931 | |
^{†}Homecoming
