= 1956 Langston Lions football team =

American college football season

1956 Langston Lions football
- Conference: Southwestern Athletic Conference
- Record: 3–7 (2–4 SWAC)
- Head coach: Caesar Felton Gayles (27th season)
- Home stadium: Anderson Field

1956 Southwestern Athletic Conference football standings
	Conf.					Overall
Team	W		L		T	W		L		T
Texas Southern +	5	–	1	–	0	9	–	2	–	0
Wiley +	5	–	1	–	0	6	–	3	–	1
Southern	4	–	2	–	0	5	–	5	–	0
Prairie View A&M	4	–	2	–	0	5	–	5	–	0
Langston	2	–	4	–	0	3	–	7	–	0
Arkansas AM&N	0	–	5	–	1	2	–	6	–	1
Texas College	0	–	5	–	1	2	–	6	–	1
+ – Conference co-champions

The 1956 Langston Lions football team represented Langston University as a member of the Southwestern Athletic Conference (SWAC) during the 1956 college football season. Led by 27th-year head coach Caesar Felton Gayles, the Lions compiled an overall record of 3–7, with a conference record of 2–4, and finished fifth in the SWAC.

== Schedule ==
Date	Opponent	Site	Result	Attendance	Source
September 15	at Southwestern State (OK)*	Milam Stadium; Weatherford, OK	L 20–40	6,000	
September 21	at Central State (OK)*	Central Field; Edmond, OK	L 7–21		
September 29	at Tennessee A&I*	Hale Stadium; Nashville, TN	L 7–46	3,500	
October 6	Texas College	Anderson Stadium; Langston, OK	W 19–13		
October 13	vs. Lincoln (MO)*	Municipal Stadium; Kansas City, MO	W 14–7	4,500	
October 20	at Southern	University Stadium; Baton Rouge, LA	L 0–8		
October 27	vs. Texas Southern	Farrington Field; Fort Worth, TX	L 7–50	3,000	
November 3	at Wiley	Wiley Field; Marshall, TX	L 2–12		
November 10	Arkansas AM&N^{†}	Anderson Stadium; Langston, OK	W 19–6	3,500	
November 17	Prairie View A&M	Anderson Stadium; Langston, OK	L 0–12		
*Non-conference game; ^{†}Homecoming
