= 1956 Texas Southern Tigers football team =

American college football season

1956 Texas Southern Tigers football

SWAC co-champion

Prairie View Bowl, L 6–27 vs. Prairie View A&M
- Conference: Southwestern Athletic Conference
- Record: 9–2 (5–1 SWAC)
- Head coach: Alexander Durley (8th season)
- Home stadium: Public School Stadium

1956 Southwestern Athletic Conference football standings
	Conf.					Overall
Team	W		L		T	W		L		T
Texas Southern +	5	–	1	–	0	9	–	2	–	0
Wiley +	5	–	1	–	0	6	–	3	–	1
Southern	4	–	2	–	0	5	–	5	–	0
Prairie View A&M	4	–	2	–	0	5	–	5	–	0
Langston	2	–	4	–	0	3	–	7	–	0
Arkansas AM&N	0	–	5	–	1	2	–	6	–	1
Texas College	0	–	5	–	1	2	–	6	–	1
+ – Conference co-champions

The 1956 Texas Southern Tigers football team was an American football team that represented Texas Southern University as a member of the Southwestern Athletic Conference (SWAC) during the 1956 college football season. Led by ninth-year head coach Alexander Durley, the Tigers compiled an overall record of 9–2, with a mark of 5–1 in conference play, and finished as SWAC co-champion.

== Schedule ==
Date	Opponent	Site	Result	Attendance	Source
September 22	vs. Southern	Public School Stadium; Galveston, TX	W 19–7		
September 29	Wiley	Public School Stadium; Houston, TX	L 0–6		
October 6	Prairie View A&M	Public School Stadium; Houston, TX (rivalry)	W 13–7	11,000	
October 13	at Texas College	Steer Stadium; Tyler, TX	W 44–20		
October 20	Lincoln (MO)*^{†}	Public School Stadium; Houston, TX	W 19–13	8,500	
October 27	vs. Langston	Farrington Field; Fort Worth, TX	W 50–7	3,000	
November 3	at Jackson State*	Alumni Field; Jackson, MS	W 26–13		
November 12	Paul Quinn*	Public School Stadium; Houston, TX	W 47–7		
November 17	at Arkansas AM&N	Pumphrey Stadium; Pine Bluff, AR	W 26–6		
November 24	Mississippi Vocational*	Public School Stadium; Houston, TX	W 44–21		
January 1, 1957	vs. Prairie View A&M*	Public School Stadium; Houston, TX (Prairie View Bowl)	L 6–27	5,500	
*Non-conference game; ^{†}Homecoming
