= 1956 Prairie View A&M Panthers football team =

American college football season

1956 Prairie View A&M Panthers football

Prairie View Bowl, W 27–6 vs. Texas Southern
- Conference: Southwestern Athletic Conference
- Record: 5–5 (4–2 SWAC)
- Head coach: Billy Nicks (8th season)
- Home stadium: Blackshear Field

1956 Southwestern Athletic Conference football standings
	Conf.					Overall
Team	W		L		T	W		L		T
Texas Southern +	5	–	1	–	0	9	–	2	–	0
Wiley +	5	–	1	–	0	6	–	3	–	1
Southern	4	–	2	–	0	5	–	5	–	0
Prairie View A&M	4	–	2	–	0	5	–	5	–	0
Langston	2	–	4	–	0	3	–	7	–	0
Arkansas AM&N	0	–	5	–	1	2	–	6	–	1
Texas College	0	–	5	–	1	2	–	6	–	1
+ – Conference co-champions

The 1956 Prairie View A&M Panthers football team represented Prairie View A&M College of Texas (now known as Prairie View A&M University) as a member of the Southwestern Athletic Conference (SWAC) during the 1956 college football season. Led by eighth-year head coach Billy Nicks, the Panthers compiled an overall record of 5–5, with a conference record of 4–2, and finished tied for third in the SWAC.

== Schedule ==
Date	Opponent	Site	Result	Attendance	Source
September 22	at Jackson*	Alumni Stadium; Jackson, MS	L 12–20		
October 6	at Texas Southern	Public School Stadium; Houston, TX (rivalry)	L 7–13	11,000	
October 15	vs. Tennessee A&I*	Cotton Bowl; Dallas, TX (State Fair Classic)	L 0–45	5,000	
October 27	Arkansas AM&N	Blackshear Field; Prairie View, TX	W 43–6		
November 3	Texas College^{†}	Blackshear Field; Prairie View, TX	W 36–12	8,500	
November 10	at Grambling*	Tiger Stadium; Grambling, LA	L 0–46		
November 17	at Langston	Anderson Stadium; Langston, OK	W 12–0		
November 24	Southern	Blackshear Field; Prairie View, TX	W 14–6		
December 1	vs. Wiley	State Fair Stadium; Shreveport, LA	L 0–27		
January 1, 1957	vs. Texas Southern*	Public School Stadium; Houston, TX (Prairie View Bowl)	W 27–6	5,500	
*Non-conference game; ^{†}Homecoming
