= 1956 Northern Illinois State Huskies football team =

American college football season

1956 Northern Illinois State Huskies football
- Conference: Interstate Intercollegiate Athletic Conference
- Record: 1–8 (0–6 IIAC)
- Head coach: Howard Fletcher (1st season)
- MVP: Tom Skubich
- Captains: Dan Biddick; Tom Skubich
- Home stadium: Glidden Field

1956 Interstate Intercollegiate Athletic Conference football standings
	Conf.					Overall
Team	W		L		T	W		L		T
Central Michigan $	6	–	0	–	0	9	–	0	–	0
Western Illinois	4	–	2	–	0	6	–	3	–	0
Eastern Michigan	3	–	3	–	0	4	–	4	–	0
Illinois State Normal	3	–	3	–	0	4	–	4	–	1
Southern Illinois	3	–	3	–	0	4	–	5	–	0
Eastern Illinois	2	–	4	–	0	2	–	7	–	0
Northern Illinois State	0	–	6	–	0	1	–	8	–	0
$ – Conference champion

The 1956 Northern Illinois State Huskies football team represented Northern Illinois State College—now known as Northern Illinois University—as a member of the Interstate Intercollegiate Athletic Conference (IIAC) during the 1956 college football season. Led by first-year head coach Howard Fletcher, the Huskies compiled an overall record of 1–8 with a mark of 0–6 in conference play, placing last out of seven teams in the IIAC. The team played home games at the 5,500-seat Glidden Field, located on the east end of campus, in DeKalb, Illinois.

== Schedule ==
Date	Opponent	Site	Result	Attendance	Source
September 22	at Wheaton (IL)*	Wheaton, IL	W 7–6		
September 29	at Illinois State Normal	McCormick Field; Normal, IL	L 0–3		
October 6	Central Michigan	Glidden Field; DeKalb, IL	L 0–41		
October 13	at Bradley*	Peoria, IL	L 7–26		
October 19	at Western Illinois	Hanson Field; Macomb, IL	L 6–34		
October 27	Omaha*	Glidden Field; DeKalb, IL	L 0–12		
November 3	Eastern Illinois^{†}	Glidden Field; DeKalb, IL	L 6–13	7,000	
November 10	at Eastern Michigan	Briggs Field; Ypsilanti, MI	L 7–25		
November 17	Southern Illinois	Glidden Field; DeKalb, IL	L 13–28		
*Non-conference game; ^{†}Homecoming
