= 1956 East Carolina Pirates football team =

American college football season

1956 East Carolina Pirates football
- Conference: North State Conference
- Record: 2–7–1 (2–3 NSC)
- Head coach: Jack Boone (5th season)
- Home stadium: College Stadium

1956 North State Conference football standings
	Conf.					Overall
Team	W		L		T	W		L		T
Lenoir Rhyne $	6	–	0	–	0	10	–	0	–	0
Catawba	4	–	2	–	0	5	–	4	–	1
Elon	4	–	2	–	0	5	–	5	–	0
Appalachian State	3	–	3	–	0	3	–	6	–	0
East Carolina	2	–	3	–	0	2	–	7	–	1
Guilford	0	–	4	–	0	1	–	7	–	0
Western Carolina	0	–	5	–	0	1	–	9	–	0
$ – Conference champion

The 1956 East Carolina Pirates football team was an American football team that represented East Carolina College (now known as East Carolina University) as a member of the North State Conference during the 1956 NAIA football season. In their fifth season under head coach Jack Boone, the team compiled a 2–7–1 record.

== Schedule ==
Date	Opponent	Site	Result	Attendance	Source
September 8	Norfolk NAS*	College Stadium; Greenville, NC	L 19–20	6,000	
September 15	vs. VPI*	Mitchell Stadium; Bluefield, WV	L 2–37	6,000	
September 22	Stetson*	College Stadium; Greenville, NC	T 7–7		
September 29	Catawba	College Stadium; Greenville, NC	L 13–23		
October 6	at Elon	Burlington Memorial Stadium; Burlington, NC	W 18–7		
October 13	Western Carolina	College Stadium; Greenville, NC	W 20–19		
October 20	Morris Harvey*	College Stadium; Greenville, NC	L 0–28	3,500	
October 27	at Appalachian State	College Field; Boone, NC	L 19–22	4,000	
November 3	at Lenoir Rhyne	College Field; Hickory, NC	L 12–57	4,100	
November 17	Richmond*	College Stadium; Greenville, NC	L 7–45	5,500	
*Non-conference game
