= 1956 Buffalo Bulls football team =

American college football season

1956 Buffalo Bulls football
- Conference: Independent
- Record: 5–3
- Head coach: Dick Offenhamer (2nd season)
- Captains: Dick Doll; Chuck Krawczyk
- Home stadium: Rotary Field

1956 Eastern non-major college football independents records
	Conf.			Overall
Team	W	L	T	W		L		T
Alfred		–		8	–	0	–	0
Hofstra		–		7	–	3	–	0
Franklin & Marshall		–		5	–	2	–	1
Buffalo		–		5	–	3	–	0
Drexel		–		5	–	3	–	0
Washington & Jefferson		–		3	–	4	–	1
Bucknell		–		3	–	5	–	0
Carnegie Tech		–		3	–	5	–	0
Temple		–		3	–	5	–	0

The 1956 Buffalo Bulls football team was an American football team that represented the University of Buffalo as an independent during the 1956 college football season. In their second season under head coach Dick Offenhamer, the Bulls compiled a 5–3 record. The team played its home games at Rotary Field in Buffalo, New York.

== Schedule ==
Date	Opponent	Site	Result	Attendance	Source
September 22	at Cortland	Cortland, NY	W 26–12		
September 26	Carnegie Tech	Rotary Field; Buffalo, NY	W 13–6		
October 13	at Western Reserve	Cleveland, OH	L 13–20		
October 20	St. Lawrence	Rotary Field; Buffalo, NY	W 41–12		
October 27	Alfred	Rotary Field; Buffalo, NY	L 19–26	9,000	
November 3	at Bucknell	Memorial Stadium; Lewisburg, PA	W 31–13	3,500	
November 10	Ohio Northern	Rotary Field; Buffalo, NY	W 72–0		
November 17	at Hobart	Geneva, NY	L 12–33	4,500	
