= 1956 Eastern Illinois Panthers football team =

American college football season

1956 Eastern Illinois Panthers football
- Conference: Interstate Intercollegiate Athletic Conference
- Record: 2–7 (2–4 IIAC)
- Head coach: Keith Smith (1st season)
- Home stadium: Lincoln Field

1956 Interstate Intercollegiate Athletic Conference football standings
	Conf.					Overall
Team	W		L		T	W		L		T
Central Michigan $	6	–	0	–	0	9	–	0	–	0
Western Illinois	4	–	2	–	0	6	–	3	–	0
Eastern Michigan	3	–	3	–	0	4	–	4	–	0
Illinois State Normal	3	–	3	–	0	4	–	4	–	1
Southern Illinois	3	–	3	–	0	4	–	5	–	0
Eastern Illinois	2	–	4	–	0	2	–	7	–	0
Northern Illinois State	0	–	6	–	0	1	–	8	–	0
$ – Conference champion

The 1956 Eastern Illinois Panthers football team represented Eastern Illinois University as a member of the Interstate Intercollegiate Athletic Conference (IIAC) during the 1956 college football season. The team was led by first-year head coach Keith Smith and played their home games at Lincoln Field in Charleston, Illinois. The Panthers finished the season with a 2–7 record overall and a 2–4 record in conference play.

== Schedule ==
Date	Opponent	Site	Result	Attendance	Source
September 22	at Indiana State*	Memorial Stadium; Terre Haute, IN	L 7–13		
September 29	at Southeast Missouri State*	Houck Stadium; Cape Girardeau, MO	L 13–46		
October 6	Illinois State Normal	Lincoln Field; Charleston, IL (rivalry)	W 14–6		
October 13	Southern Illinois	Lincoln Field; Charleston, IL	L 0–33		
October 20	Evansville*	Lincoln Field; Charleston, IL	L 21–29		
October 27	at Eastern Michigan	Briggs Field; Ypsilanti, MI	L 0–65		
November 3	at Northern Illinois State	Glidden Field; DeKalb, IL	W 13–6	7,000	
November 10	Central Michigan	Lincoln Field; Charleston, IL	L 7–38		
November 17	at Western Illinois	Hanson Field; Macomb, IL	L 14–58		
*Non-conference game
