= 1956 Appalachian State Mountaineers football team =

American college football season

1956 Appalachian State Mountaineers football
- Conference: North State Conference
- Record: 3–6 (3–3 NSC)
- Head coach: Bob Broome (1st season)
- Home stadium: College Field

1956 North State Conference football standings
	Conf.					Overall
Team	W		L		T	W		L		T
Lenoir Rhyne $	6	–	0	–	0	10	–	0	–	0
Catawba	4	–	2	–	0	5	–	4	–	1
Elon	4	–	2	–	0	5	–	5	–	0
Appalachian State	3	–	3	–	0	3	–	6	–	0
East Carolina	2	–	3	–	0	2	–	7	–	1
Guilford	0	–	4	–	0	1	–	7	–	0
Western Carolina	0	–	5	–	0	1	–	9	–	0
$ – Conference champion

The 1956 Appalachian State Mountaineers football team was an American football team that represented Appalachian State Teachers College (now known as Appalachian State University) as a member of the North State Conference during the 1956 NAIA football season. In their first year under head coach Bob Broome, the Mountaineers compiled an overall record of 3–6, with a mark of 3–3 in conference play, and finished third in the NSC.

== Schedule ==
Date	Opponent	Site	Result	Attendance	Source
September 22	vs. Western Carolina	Memorial Stadium; Asheville, NC (rivalry)	W 19–7		
September 29	Elon	College Field; Boone, NC	L 7–19	4,000	
October 6	at Lenoir Rhyne	College Field; Hickory, NC	L 0–32		
October 13	Catawba^{†}	College Field; Boone, NC	L 7–14	6,000	
October 20	at Emory & Henry*	Faulkner Field; Emory, VA	L 6–12		
October 27	East Carolina	College Field; Boone, NC	W 22–19	4,000	
November 3	Guilford	College Field; Boone, NC	W 32–7		
November 10	at Presbyterian*	Bailey Stadium; Clinton, SC	L 7–34	2,000	
November 17	at Tampa*	Phillips Field; Tampa, FL	L 7–21	6,500	
*Non-conference game; ^{†}Homecoming
