= 1956 Lenoir Rhyne Bears football team =

American college football season

1956 Lenoir Rhyne Bears football

NSC champion
- Conference: North State Conference
- Record: 10–0 (6–0 NSC)
- Head coach: Clarence Stasavich (11th season)
- Home stadium: College Field

1956 North State Conference football standings
	Conf.					Overall
Team	W		L		T	W		L		T
Lenoir Rhyne $	6	–	0	–	0	10	–	0	–	0
Catawba	4	–	2	–	0	5	–	4	–	1
Elon	4	–	2	–	0	5	–	5	–	0
Appalachian State	3	–	3	–	0	3	–	6	–	0
East Carolina	2	–	3	–	0	2	–	7	–	1
Guilford	0	–	4	–	0	1	–	7	–	0
Western Carolina	0	–	5	–	0	1	–	9	–	0
$ – Conference champion

The 1956 Lenoir Rhyne Bears football team was an American football team that represented Lenoir Rhyne College (now known as Lenoir–Rhyne University) as a member of the North State Conference (NSC) during the 1956 NAIA football season. In their 11th season under head coach Clarence Stasavich, the team compiled a 10–0 record (6–0 against conference opponents), won the NSC championship, and outscored opponents by a total of 380 to 70. 1956 remains the only perfect season in the history of the Lenoir–Rhyne Bears football program. The Bears also had undefeated seasons in 1955 and 1960 in which their record was marred only by a single tie game.

Fullback Harold Bullard led the team with 1,075 rushing yards and 96 points scored. Quarterback Dean Cline led the team in passing with 344 passing yards. Guard Arden Ray was selected as a second-team player on the 1956 Little All-America college football team. Eight Lenoir Rhyne players were selected as first-team players on one or more of the All-NSC football teams: halfback Walter Cornwell; fullback Harold Bullard; quarterback Dean Cline; end Hume Collins; guard Arden Ray; center Allan LaTorre; and tackles Bill Dameron and Leveo Sperotto. Cornwell and Ray were unanimous picks.

The 1956 season was part of an eight-year run from 1955 to 1962 under Stasavich and his successor, Hanley Painter, during which Lenoir Rhyne compiled a 76–6–4 record and won eight consecutive NSC championships and an NAIA national title in 1960.

The team played home games at College Field in Hickory, North Carolina.

== Schedule ==
Date	Opponent	Site	Result	Attendance	Source
September 15	Apprentice*	College Field; Hickory, NC	W 67–0		
September 22	at Wofford*	Spartanburg, SC	W 13–7		
September 29	at Newberry*	Newberry, SC	W 35–25	3,000	
October 6	Appalachian State	College Field; Hickory, NC	W 32–0		
October 13	at Guilford	Guilford, NC	W 61–7		
October 20	Western Carolina	College Field; Hickory, NC	W 35–0	4,000	
October 27	Emory and Henry*^{†}	College Field; Hickory, NC	W 25–6	8,000	
November 3	East Carolina	College Field; Hickory, NC	W 57–12	4,100	
November 10	at Elon	Memorial Stadium; Burlington, NC	W 27–13	5,000	
November 22	at Catawba	Shuford Field; Salisbury, NC	W 28–0	7,000	
*Non-conference game; ^{†}Homecoming
