= 1956 Lafayette Leopards football team =

American college football season

1956 Lafayette Leopards football
- Conference: Middle Three Conference
- Record: 6–3 (0–2 Middle Three)
- Head coach: Steve Hokuf (5th season)
- Captains: Robert Burcin; Jack Slotter
- Home stadium: Fisher Field

1956 Middle Three Conference football standings
	Conf.					Overall
Team	W		L		T	W		L		T
Lehigh $	2	–	0	–	0	7	–	2	–	0
Rutgers	1	–	1	–	0	3	–	7	–	0
Lafayette	0	–	2	–	0	6	–	3	–	0
$ – Conference champion

The 1956 Lafayette Leopards football team was an American football team that represented Lafayette College during the 1956 college football season. Lafayette finished last in the Middle Three Conference. In their fifth year under head coach Steve Hokuf, the Leopards compiled a 6–3 record, but lost both matchups with their conference opponents. Jack Slotter and Robert Burcin were the team captains. Lafayette played home games at Fisher Field on College Hill in Easton, Pennsylvania.

== Schedule ==
Date	Opponent	Site	Result	Attendance	Source
September 22	at Muhlenberg*	Allentown High School Stadium; Allentown, PA	W 26–0	3,500	
September 29	Temple*	Fisher Field; Easton, PA	W 20–0		
October 6	at Delaware*	Delaware Stadium; Newark, DE	W 28–14	5,800	
October 13	Albright*	Fisher Field; Easton, PA	W 32–7	4,000	
October 20	at Bucknell*	Memorial Stadium; Lewisburg, PA	W 13–7	7,000	
October 27	Gettysburg*	Fisher Field; Easton, PA	L 6–12	7,500	
November 3	at Rutgers	Rutgers Stadium; Piscataway, NJ	L 19–20	5,000	
November 10	Western Maryland*	Fisher Field; Easton, PA	W 43–7		
November 17	Lehigh	Fisher Field; Easton, PA (The Rivalry)	L 10–27	19,000	
*Non-conference game
