= 1956 Florida A&M Rattlers football team =

American college football season

1956 Florida A&M Rattlers football

SIAC champion

Orange Blossom Classic, L 39–41 vs. Tennessee A&I
- Conference: Southern Intercollegiate Athletic Conference
- Record: 8–1 (5–0 SIAC)
- Head coach: Jake Gaither (12th season)
- Home stadium: Bragg Stadium

1956 Southern Intercollegiate Athletic Conference football standings
	Conf.					Overall
Team	W		L		T	W		L		T
Florida A&M $	5	–	0	–	0	8	–	1	–	0
Bethune–Cookman	4	–	2	–	0	6	–	3	–	0
Allen	5	–	1	–	1	7	–	1	–	1
Morris Brown	4	–	2	–	0	5	–	3	–	0
Xavier (LA)	4	–	2	–	0	6	–	3	–	0
Tuskegee	5	–	2	–	0	6	–	3	–	0
Clark (GA)	3	–	4	–	0	4	–	4	–	0
Knoxville	3	–	3	–	0	4	–	5	–	0
South Carolina State	3	–	4	–	0	5	–	4	–	0
Alabama State	3	–	4	–	1	4	–	4	–	1
Benedict	2	–	3	–	0	4	–	3	–	0
Fisk	2	–	3	–	0	2	–	5	–	0
Fort Valley State	2	–	5	–	1	3	–	5	–	1
Alabama A&M	2	–	5	–	1	2	–	5	–	1
Morehouse	1	–	5	–	0	1	–	7	–	0
Lane	0	–	3	–	0	3	–	5	–	0
$ – Conference champion; Standings were based on Dickinson System ratings.

The 1956 Florida A&M Rattlers football team was an American football team that represented Florida A&M University as a member of the Southern Intercollegiate Athletic Conference (SIAC) during the 1956 college football season. In their 12th season under head coach Jake Gaither, the Rattlers compiled an 8–1 record, won the SIAC championship, and outscored opponents by a total of 406 to 98. The team played its home games at Bragg Stadium in Tallahassee, Florida.

The Rattlers' sole loss was by two points to undefeated black college national champion Tennessee A&I before a crowd of 41,808 in the Orange Blossom Classic. Florida A&M was stopped six inches from a game-winning touchdown in the final minute of the game. Willie Galimore rushed for 127 yards and three touchdowns in the game, but also fumbled three times.

The team's statistical leaders included Galimore with 820 rushing yards, Dennis Jefferson with 708 passing yards, and Al Frazier with 405 receiving yards. Gallimore and Frazier each scored 16 touchdowns. Frazier tallied 116 points, a single-season team scoring record that still stands. Galimore later played seven years with the Chicago Bears and was inducted into the College Football Hall of Fame.

== Schedule ==
Date	Opponent	Site	Result	Attendance	Source
September 22	at North Carolina College*	Durham Athletic Park; Durham, NC	W 25–0	4,200	
October 6	Fort Valley State	Bragg Stadium; Tallahassee, FL	W 33–6	2,500	
October 13	at Morris Brown	Herndon Stadium; Atlanta, GA	W 46–14	6,000	
October 20	vs. Bethune–Cookman	Gator Bowl Stadium; Jacksonville, FL (Florida Classic)	W 54–6	17,000	
October 27	Xavier (LA)	Bragg Stadium; Tallahassee, FL	W 68–6		
November 3	North Carolina A&T*^{†}	Bragg Stadium; Tallahassee, FL	W 49–13	7,500	
November 10	Allen	Bragg Stadium; Tallahassee, FL	W 58–6		
November 17	at Southern*	Municipal Stadium; Baton Rouge, LA	W 34–6		
December 1	vs. Tennessee A&I*	Burdine Stadium; Miami, FL (Orange Blossom Classic)	L 39–41	41,808	
*Non-conference game; ^{†}Homecoming; Source:
