= 1956 Tennessee A&I Tigers football team =

American college football season

1956 Tennessee A&I Tigers football

Black college national champion MWAA champion

Orange Blossom Classic, W 41–39 vs. Florida A&M
- Conference: Midwest Athletic Association
- Record: 10–0 (4–0 MWAA)
- Head coach: Howard C. Gentry (2nd season)
- Home stadium: Hale Stadium

1956 Midwest Athletic Association football standings
	Conf.					Overall
Team	W		L		T	W		L		T
No. 1 Tennessee A&I $	4	–	0	–	0	10	–	0	–	0
No. 3 Grambling	1	–	1	–	0	8	–	1	–	0
No. 7 Jackson State	1	–	1	–	0	6	–	2	–	2
No. 14 Central State (OH)	1	–	1	–	1	4	–	3	–	1
Lincoln (MO)	1	–	2	–	0	5	–	4	–	0
Kentucky State	0	–	3	–	1	3	–	5	–	1
$ – Conference champion; Rankings from Pittsburgh Courier

The 1956 Tennessee A&I Tigers football team represented Tennessee Agricultural & Industrial State College as a member of the Midwest Athletic Association (MWAA) during the 1956 college football season. In their second season under head coach Howard C. Gentry, the Tigers compiled a perfect 10–0 record, won the MWAA championship, shut out five of ten opponents, and outscored all opponents by a total of 394 to 64. The team was also recognized as black college national champion.

The team was led by halfbacks Jesse Wilburn and Ray Mitchell, quarterback Robert Crawford, ends Don Taylor and Leon Jamison, and tackle Charles Gavin. Allowing only 25 points in nine regular season games, the team had the best scoring defense in the country.

== Schedule ==
Date	Opponent	Site	Result	Attendance	Source
September 29	Langston*	Hale Stadium; Nashville, TN	W 46–7		
October 6	Grambling	Hale Stadium; Nashville, TN	W 33–0		
October 15	vs. Prairie View A&M*	Cotton Bowl; Dallas, TX	W 45–0	5,000	
October 20	at Central State (OH)	Wilberforce, OH	W 32–6		
October 27	vs. Maryland State*	Washington, DC	W 6–0	12,000	
November 3	Southern*	Hale Stadium; Nashville, TN	W 52–6		
November 10	vs. Alcorn A&M*	Memphis, TN	W 52–6		
November 17	at Kentucky State	Frankfort, KY	W 40–0		
November 22	Lincoln (MO)	Hale Stadium; Nashville, TN	W 47–0		
December 1	vs. Florida A&M*	Orange Bowl; Miami, FL (Orange Blossom Classic)	W 41–39	41,808	
*Non-conference game
