= 1956 Texas College Steers football team =

American college football season

1956 Texas College Steers football
- Conference: Southwestern Athletic Conference
- Record: 2–6–1 (0–5–1 SWAC)
- Head coach: Giles O. Wright (1st season)
- Home stadium: Steer Stadium

1956 Southwestern Athletic Conference football standings
	Conf.					Overall
Team	W		L		T	W		L		T
Texas Southern +	5	–	1	–	0	9	–	2	–	0
Wiley +	5	–	1	–	0	6	–	3	–	1
Southern	4	–	2	–	0	5	–	5	–	0
Prairie View A&M	4	–	2	–	0	5	–	5	–	0
Langston	2	–	4	–	0	3	–	7	–	0
Arkansas AM&N	0	–	5	–	1	2	–	6	–	1
Texas College	0	–	5	–	1	2	–	6	–	1
+ – Conference co-champions

The 1956 Texas College Steers football team represented Texas College as a member of the Southwestern Athletic Conference (SWAC) during the 1956 college football season. Led by first-year head coach Giles O. Wright, the Steers compiled an overall record of 2–6–1, and a mark of 0–5–1 in conference play, and finished tied for sixth in the SWAC.

== Schedule ==
Date	Opponent	Site	Result	Source
September 22	at Paul Quinn*	Jackson Stadium; Waco, TX	L 14–20	
September 29	Arkansas AM&N	Steer Stadium; Tyler, TX	T 14–14	
October 6	at Langston	Anderson Stadium; Langston, OK	L 13–19	
October 13	Texas Southern	Steer Stadium; Tyler, TX	L 20–44	
October 20	Dillard*	Steer Stadium; Tyler, TX	W 28–6	
October 27	Southern	Steer Stadium; Tyler, TX	L 20–39	
November 3	at Prairie View A&M	Blackshear Field; Prairie View, TX	L 12–36	
November 10	at Bishop*	Tiger Stadium; Marshall, TX	W 41–0	
November 24	Wiley	Steer Stadium; Tyler, TX	L 13–20	
*Non-conference game
