= 1956 Drexel Dragons football team =

American college football season

1956 Drexel Dragons football
- Conference: Independent
- Record: 5–3
- Head coach: Eddie Allen (7th season)
- Captains: Bill Zador; Vince Vidas
- Home stadium: Drexel Field

1956 Eastern non-major college football independents records
	Conf.			Overall
Team	W	L	T	W		L		T
Alfred		–		8	–	0	–	0
Hofstra		–		7	–	3	–	0
Franklin & Marshall		–		5	–	2	–	1
Buffalo		–		5	–	3	–	0
Drexel		–		5	–	3	–	0
Washington & Jefferson		–		3	–	4	–	1
Bucknell		–		3	–	5	–	0
Carnegie Tech		–		3	–	5	–	0
Temple		–		3	–	5	–	0

The 1956 Drexel Dragons football team represented the Drexel Institute of Technology (renamed Drexel University in 1970) as an independent during the 1956 college football season. Eddie Allen was the team's head coach. Left guard Vince Vidas was awarded first string on the Little All-America college football team for the second consecutive year.

== Schedule ==
Date	Opponent	Site	Result
September 30	New Haven	Drexel Field; Philadelphia, PA	L 19–28
October 6	at Ursinus	Collegeville, PA	W 13–7
October 13	West Chester	Drexel Field; Philadelphia, PA	L 7–13
October 20	Pennsylvania Military^{†}	Drexel Field; Philadelphia, PA	W 44–21
October 27	at Juniata	Huntingdon, PA	L 13–19
November 3	Western Maryland	Drexel Field; Philadelphia, PA	W 20–6
November 10	at Lebanon Valley	Lebanon High School Stadium; Annville, PA	W 32–12
November 17	Coast Guard	New London, CT	W 20–7
^{†}Homecoming

== Roster ==
1956 Drexel Dragons football team roster
Players
Coaches
Offense

Pos.	#	Name	Class
FB, K		Ron Kleppinger	Sr
TE		Iles Wauhop	Sr
TE		Art Barnes
OT		Vince Vidas (C)	Sr
G		Don Whitney
G		Ed Schmidt
C		Jack Eidenberg
HB, P		Frank Russo	Sr
HB		John Maloney	Jr
HB		Gambone
QB, K	19	Bill Zador (C)	Sr
QB		Dave Ritchie
[[American football positions|]]		Dick Hughes	Sr

Defense

Pos.	#	Name	Class

Special teams

Pos.	#	Name	Class

Head coach

- Eddie Allen (Penn)

Coordinators/assistant coaches

- Jack Hinkle (Syracuse)
- Ev Gest (Drexel)

Legend

- (C) Team captain
- (S) Suspended
- (I) Ineligible
- Injured
- Redshirt
