= 1956 college football season =

American college football season

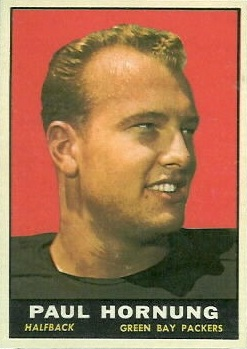
- Heisman Trophy winner Paul Hornung
- First AP No. 1 of season: Oklahoma
- Regular season: September 22 – December 1, 1956
- Number of bowls: 6
- Bowl games: December 29, 1956 – January 1, 1957
- Champion(s): Oklahoma (AP, Coaches, FWAA)
- Heisman: Paul Hornung (quarterback, Notre Dame)

The 1956 college football season was the 88th season of intercollegiate football in the United States. It finished with five teams having claim to a national championship:

- Oklahoma compiled a 10–0 record in their 10th season under Bud Wilkinson and is recognized as the consensus national champion, having been ranked No. 1 in the final Associated Press (AP) and United Press (UP) coaches polls. The Sooners were also recognized as the 1956 national champion by the Football Writers Association of America and at least 10 other official selectors. Two Oklahoma players, Tommy McDonald and Jerry Tubbs, ranked third and fourth in voting for the Heisman Trophy. The Sooners ranked first in total offense with 481.7 yards per game (391 rushing yards) and second in total defense with 193.8 yards per game. The 1956 season was part of a 47-game winning streak that ran from October 10, 1953, to November 9, 1957.
- Tennessee compiled a 10–1 record, losing to Baylor in the Sugar Bowl; prior to this the Volunteers were rated No. 2 in the final AP and UP polls. Tennessee halfback Johnny Majors was the runner up in voting for the Heisman Trophy. Decades later, Tennessee was chosen as the 1956 national champion by the Sagarin Ratings.
- Iowa compiled a 9–1 record, including a victory over Oregon State in the Rose Bowl. The Hawkeyes were rated No. 3 in the final AP and UP polls. Years later, they were chosen as the 1956 national champion by College Football Researchers Association.
- Georgia Tech compiled a 10–1 record under Bobby Dodd and defeated Pittsburgh in the Gator Bowl. The Yellow Jackets were rated No. 4 in the final AP and UP polls but were selected as the 1956 national champion by Berryman (QPRS), Houlgate System, and Sagarin Ratings.
- Tennessee A&I compiled a 10–0 record, defeated Florida A&M in the Orange Blossom Classic, and has been recognized as the black college national champion.

At the small-college level, Montana State (9–0–1) and Saint Joseph's (8–1–1 ) played to a scoreless tie in the NAIA national championship game.

Notre Dame quarterback Paul Hornung won the Heisman Trophy, and Oklahoma's Tommy McDonald won the Maxwell Award. Individual statistical leaders in major college football included Stanford quarterback John Brodie with 1,642 yards of total offense and 1,633 passing yards, Wyoming back Jim Crawford with 1,104 rushing yards, and Oklahoma halfback Clendon Thomas with 108 points scored.

== Conference and program changes ==
One new conference began play in 1956: Ivy League

One new program began to play in 1956: Air Force Falcons.

== Season chronology ==
=== September ===
In the preseason poll released on September 17, the defending champion Oklahoma Sooners, coming into the season with a 30-game winning streak, were the first place choice for 116 of 149 writers casting votes. They were followed by Michigan State, Notre Dame, Georgia Tech and Ohio State. New polls were issued weekly on Monday.

On September 22, No. 1 Oklahoma and No. 2 Michigan State were idle. No. 3 Notre Dame lost in Dallas to unranked SMU, 19–13, and dropped out of the top five for the season (and finished 2–8), while SMU would rise to fifth. No. 4 Georgia Tech won at Kentucky, 14–6. No. 5 Ohio State, which had not started play, fell out of the Top 5 and was replaced by No. 7 TCU, which had opened with a 32–0 win at Kansas. The first regular AP poll was No. 1 Oklahoma, No. 2 Georgia Tech, No. 3 Michigan State, No. 4 TCU, and No. 5 SMU.

September 29, No. 1 Oklahoma opened its season with a 36–0 win over North Carolina. In Dallas, No. 2 Georgia Tech visited No. 5 SMU and narrowly won, 9–7. No. 3 Michigan State won, 21–7, at No. 12 Stanford. No. 4 TCU was idle and dropped to 8th, while No. 8 Ohio State rose to 4th after a 34–7 win hosting Nebraska. No. 13 Michigan, which had beaten UCLA, 42–13, rose to fifth. The next poll was No. 1 Oklahoma, No. 2 Michigan State, No. 3 Georgia Tech, No. 4 Ohio State, and No. 5 Michigan.

=== October ===
October 6 No. 1 Oklahoma registered another shutout, beating Kansas State 66–0. No. 2 Michigan State met No. 5 Michigan in the rain before a crowd of 101,001 at Ann Arbor, and MSU Coach Duffy Daugherty's "umbrella defense" forced two Michigan turnovers that led to the Spartans' 9–0 win. No. 3 Georgia Tech was idle, and No. 4 Ohio State won 32–20 at home before 82,881 over Stanford. The poll saw Michigan drop to 12th, while No. 8 TCU (which beat Arkansas 41–6 on national television) returned to the top five: No. 1 Oklahoma, No. 2 Michigan State, No. 3 Georgia Tech, No. 4 TCU, and No. 5 Ohio State.

October 13 At Dallas, No. 1 Oklahoma beat Texas 45–0, having outscored its opposition 147–0 in three games. A commentator of the day wrote, "The overpowering charge of the big red-shirted Oklahoma line ahead of adroit Quarterback Jimmy Harris is just one of the reasons why Oklahoma may be the greatest college football team of all time... They showed it in the sudden, lifting charge of a line which moved all of a piece, like a wave breaking evenly along a beach." No. 2 Michigan State defeated Indiana 53–6 at home. No. 3 Georgia Tech beat LSU, 39–7. No. 4 TCU won at Alabama 23–6, and No. 5 Ohio State won 26–6 at Illinois. The top five remained unchanged.

October 20 No. 1 Oklahoma gave up its first points of the season, but registered its fourth win, 34–12, at Kansas. No. 2 Michigan State stayed unbeaten with a 47–14 win at Notre Dame. No. 3 Georgia Tech beat Auburn 28–7. In a game that would ultimately determine the SWC championship, No. 4 TCU lost at No. 14 Texas A&M, 7–6. No. 5 Ohio State lost to Penn State by the same 7–6 score. No. 7 Tennessee, which had beaten Alabama 24–0, rose to 4th, and No. 8 Michigan returned to the Top 5 after its 34–20 win over Northwestern. The next poll: No. 1 Michigan State, No. 2 Oklahoma, No. 3 Georgia Tech, No. 4 Tennessee, and No. 5 Michigan.

October 27 The new No. 1 Michigan State went to Champaign, and had a 13–0 lead over unranked Illinois at halftime. Abe Woodson plunged for a score to cut the lead to 13–6 after three quarters. In the fourth, Woodson ran 70 yards from scrimmage to help tie the game 13–13. After an MSU field goal was short, Woodson ran the ball up to the Illini 18. Woodson, who had once held the world record in the 50 yard high hurdles, took a short pass and dashed 82 yards for a touchdown, leaping over State's Art Johnson 30 yards from goal, to pull off the 20–13 upset. No. 2 Oklahoma was determined to prove itself number 1, and Coach Bud Wilkinson directed the team to six touchdowns for a 40–0 win at Notre Dame. No. 3 Georgia Tech beat No. 15 Tulane by the same 40–0 margin. No. 4 Tennessee beat Maryland 34–7 to stay unbeaten. No. 5 Michigan had its second loss, falling to unranked Minnesota at home, 20–7. No. 7 Texas A&M, which had extended its record to 5–0–1 with a 19–13 win at No. 8 Baylor, replaced the Wolverines. The next poll: No. 1 Oklahoma, No. 2 Georgia Tech, No. 3 Tennessee, No. 4 Michigan State, and No. 5 Texas A&M.

=== November ===
November 3 Unbeaten No. 1 Oklahoma (5–0), met the Colorado Buffaloes (5–1) on the road, and were losing 19–6 at halftime to a team that was a four-touchdown underdog, but came back with touchdowns by Tommy McDonald and Clendon Thomas for a difficult 27–19 win. The rest of top five won in shutouts: No. 2 Georgia Tech won 7–0 at Duke, No. 3 Tennessee over North Carolina 20–0, No. 4 Michigan State crushed Wisconsin 33–0, and No. 5 Texas A&M beat Arkansas 27–0. The poll remained unchanged.

November 10 While No. 1 Oklahoma registered its fifth shutout in seven games, trouncing Iowa State 44–0, No. 2 Georgia Tech and No. 3 Tennessee met in Atlanta for a game that proved to determine the SEC title. There were 23 punts altogether, and no score until midway through the third quarter, when Tennessee end Buddy Cruze noticed that Tech had stopped double-teaming him. Halfback Johnny Majors (who would later be head coach for UT) passed to Cruze at the 35–yard line, and Cruze ran 64 yards down to the Tech goal line, setting up the touchdown that won the game 6–0. In the poll that followed, Tennessee was the new No. 1 by a margin of 2 points (1,446 to 1,444) over Oklahoma. No. 4 Michigan State narrowly beat Purdue, 12–9. No. 5 Texas A&M beat SMU 33–7 in Dallas, and increased its record to 7–0–1. Though on probation since 1955 for recruiting violations, coach Bear Bryant's Aggies had appealed to the NCAA to allow them to play in the postseason (as the top contenders for the Southwest Conference title, they would receive an automatic bid in the Cotton Bowl). The next day, however, the NCAA announced that Texas A&M was still banned, because of an additional recruiting violation of a basketball player. The next poll: No. 1 Tennessee, No. 2 Oklahoma, No. 3 Michigan State, No. 4 Georgia Tech, and No. 5 Texas A&M.

November 17 No. 1 Tennessee beat visiting No. 19 Ole Miss 27–7, while No. 2 Oklahoma showed off its offense in crushing Missouri 67–14, sufficiently enough to regain the top spot in the next poll. No. 3 Michigan State traveled to Minnesota, which had been No. 6 a week before, but dropped to No. 17 after a loss to Iowa. The MSU visitors lost, 14–13, and dropped to tenth place in the next poll. No. 4 Georgia Tech beat Alabama 27–0. No. 5 Texas A&M beat visiting Rice, 21–7. No. 7 Iowa, which clinched an unexpected Big Ten championship by defeating No. 6 Ohio State 6–0, took Michigan State's place in the poll that followed. The Top 5 was No. 1 Oklahoma, No. 2 Tennessee, No. 3 Iowa, No. 4 Texas A&M, and No. 5 Georgia Tech.

November 24 No. 1 Oklahoma gained 656 net yards in a defeat of visiting Nebraska 54–6. No. 2 Tennessee beat Kentucky 20–7. No. 3 Iowa finished its season with a 48–8 non-league win over Notre Dame, then accepted a bid to the Rose Bowl to play the PCC champion, No. 11 Oregon State. No. 4 Texas A&M was idle as it prepared for its Thanksgiving Day game with Texas, which it won 34–21. In Jacksonville, No. 5 Georgia Tech beat No. 13 Florida 28–0, and traded places with A&M. Tech would be invited back to the city for the Gator Bowl at season's end. The next poll: No. 1 Oklahoma, No. 2 Tennessee, No. 3 Iowa, No. 4 Georgia Tech, and No. 5 Texas A&M.

December 1 No. 1 Oklahoma closed its season with a 53–0 win over Oklahoma A&M, finishing 10–0, and with a 466–51 finish in points. Only one of its ten opponents (Colorado) finished 1956 with a winning record. In Nashville, No. 2 Tennessee beat Vanderbilt 27–7 to close with a 10–0 record and a spot in the Sugar Bowl, where it would face 8–2 Baylor. No. 4 Georgia Tech closed with a 35–0 win at Georgia. Unbeaten and once-tied (9–0–1), No. 5 Texas A&M won the Southwest Conference title, but the ban against post-season play sent runner-up TCU to the Cotton Bowl instead. The top five teams in the final poll remained the same from the previous week.

== Conference standings ==
=== Major conference standings ===
1956 Atlantic Coast Conference football standings
	Conf.					Overall
Team	W		L		T	W		L		T
No. 19 Clemson $	4	–	0	–	1	7	–	2	–	2
Duke	4	–	1	–	0	5	–	4	–	1
South Carolina	5	–	2	–	0	7	–	3	–	0
Maryland	2	–	2	–	1	2	–	7	–	1
North Carolina	2	–	3	–	1	2	–	7	–	1
NC State	2	–	4	–	0	3	–	7	–	0
Wake Forest	1	–	5	–	1	2	–	5	–	3
Virginia	1	–	4	–	0	3	–	7	–	0
Rankings from AP poll

1956 Big Seven Conference football standings
	Conf.					Overall
Team	W		L		T	W		L		T
No. 1 Oklahoma $	6	–	0	–	0	10	–	0	–	0
No. 20 Colorado	4	–	1	–	1	8	–	2	–	1
Missouri	3	–	2	–	1	4	–	5	–	1
Nebraska	3	–	3	–	0	4	–	6	–	0
Kansas	2	–	4	–	0	3	–	6	–	1
Kansas State	2	–	4	–	0	3	–	7	–	0
Iowa State	0	–	6	–	0	2	–	8	–	0
$ – Conference champion; Rankings from AP Poll

1956 Big Ten Conference football standings
	Conf.					Overall
Team	W		L		T	W		L		T
No. 3 Iowa $	5	–	1	–	0	9	–	1	–	0
No. 7 Michigan	5	–	2	–	0	7	–	2	–	0
No. 12 Minnesota	4	–	1	–	2	6	–	1	–	2
No. 9 Michigan State	4	–	2	–	0	7	–	2	–	0
No. 15 Ohio State	4	–	2	–	0	6	–	3	–	0
Northwestern	3	–	3	–	1	4	–	4	–	1
Purdue	1	–	4	–	2	3	–	4	–	2
Illinois	1	–	4	–	2	2	–	5	–	2
Wisconsin	0	–	4	–	3	1	–	5	–	3
Indiana	1	–	5	–	0	3	–	6	–	0
$ – Conference champion; Rankings from AP Poll

1956 Border Conference football standings
	Conf.					Overall
Team	W		L		T	W		L		T
Texas Western $	5	–	0	–	0	9	–	2	–	0
Arizona State	3	–	1	–	0	9	–	1	–	0
West Texas State	2	–	2	–	0	8	–	2	–	0
Arizona	1	–	2	–	0	4	–	6	–	0
Hardin–Simmons	1	–	3	–	0	4	–	6	–	0
New Mexico A&M	0	–	4	–	0	1	–	9	–	0
$ – Conference champion

1956 Ivy League football standings
	Conf.					Overall
Team	W		L		T	W		L		T
Yale $	7	–	0	–	0	8	–	1	–	0
Princeton	5	–	2	–	0	7	–	2	–	0
Dartmouth	4	–	3	–	0	5	–	4	–	0
Penn	4	–	3	–	0	4	–	5	–	0
Brown	3	–	4	–	0	5	–	4	–	0
Columbia	2	–	5	–	0	3	–	6	–	0
Harvard	2	–	5	–	0	2	–	6	–	0
Cornell	1	–	6	–	0	1	–	8	–	0
$ – Conference champion

1956 Middle Three Conference football standings
	Conf.					Overall
Team	W		L		T	W		L		T
Lehigh $	2	–	0	–	0	7	–	2	–	0
Rutgers	1	–	1	–	0	3	–	7	–	0
Lafayette	0	–	2	–	0	6	–	3	–	0
$ – Conference champion

1956 Missouri Valley Conference football standings
	Conf.					Overall
Team	W		L		T	W		L		T
Houston $	4	–	0	–	0	7	–	2	–	1
Tulsa	2	–	1	–	1	7	–	2	–	1
Oklahoma A&M	2	–	1	–	1	3	–	5	–	2
Wichita	1	–	3	–	0	4	–	7	–	0
Detroit	0	–	4	–	0	2	–	8	–	0
$ – Conference champion

1956 Pacific Coast Conference football standings
	Conf.					Overall
Team	W		L		T	W		L		T
No. 10 Oregon State $	6	–	1	–	1	7	–	3	–	1
No. 18 USC	5	–	2	–	0	8	–	2	–	0
UCLA	5	–	2	–	0	7	–	3	–	0
Washington	4	–	4	–	0	5	–	5	–	0
Oregon	3	–	3	–	2	4	–	4	–	2
Stanford	3	–	4	–	0	4	–	6	–	0
Washington State	2	–	5	–	1	3	–	6	–	1
California	2	–	5	–	0	3	–	7	–	0
Idaho	0	–	4	–	0	4	–	5	–	0
$ – Conference champion; Rankings from AP Poll

1956 Skyline Conference football standings
	Conf.					Overall
Team	W		L		T	W		L		T
Wyoming	7	–	0	–	0	10	–	0	–	0
Utah	5	–	1	–	0	5	–	5	–	0
Denver	4	–	3	–	0	6	–	4	–	0
Utah State	4	–	3	–	0	6	–	4	–	0
Colorado A&M	2	–	4	–	1	2	–	7	–	1
New Mexico	2	–	4	–	0	4	–	6	–	0
BYU	1	–	5	–	1	2	–	7	–	1
Montana	1	–	6	–	0	1	–	9	–	0
$ – Conference champion

1956 Southeastern Conference football standings
	Conf.					Overall
Team	W		L		T	W		L		T
No. 2 Tennessee $	6	–	0	–	0	10	–	1	–	0
No. 4 Georgia Tech	7	–	1	–	0	10	–	1	–	0
Florida	5	–	2	–	0	6	–	3	–	1
Ole Miss	4	–	2	–	0	7	–	3	–	0
Auburn	4	–	3	–	0	7	–	3	–	0
Kentucky	4	–	4	–	0	6	–	4	–	0
Tulane	3	–	3	–	0	6	–	4	–	0
Vanderbilt	2	–	5	–	0	5	–	5	–	0
Alabama	2	–	5	–	0	2	–	7	–	1
Mississippi State	2	–	5	–	0	4	–	6	–	0
LSU	1	–	5	–	0	3	–	7	–	0
Georgia	1	–	6	–	0	3	–	6	–	1
$ – Conference champion; Rankings from AP Poll

1956 Southern Conference football standings
	Conf.					Overall
Team	W		L		T	W		L		T
West Virginia $	5	–	0	–	0	6	–	4	–	0
VPI	3	–	0	–	0	7	–	2	–	1
No. 17 George Washington	5	–	1	–	0	8	–	1	–	1
Davidson	2	–	2	–	1	5	–	3	–	1
Furman	2	–	2	–	0	2	–	8	–	0
VMI	2	–	3	–	1	3	–	6	–	1
Richmond	2	–	5	–	0	4	–	5	–	0
The Citadel	1	–	3	–	0	3	–	5	–	1
Washington and Lee	0	–	1	–	0	1	–	7	–	0
William & Mary	0	–	5	–	0	0	–	9	–	1
$ – Conference champion; Rankings from AP Poll

1956 Southwest Conference football standings
	Conf.					Overall
Team	W		L		T	W		L		T
No. 5 Texas A&M $	6	–	0	–	0	9	–	0	–	1
No. 14 TCU	5	–	1	–	0	8	–	3	–	0
No. 11 Baylor	4	–	2	–	0	9	–	2	–	0
Arkansas	3	–	3	–	0	6	–	4	–	0
SMU	2	–	4	–	0	4	–	6	–	0
Rice	1	–	5	–	0	4	–	6	–	0
Texas	0	–	6	–	0	1	–	9	–	0
$ – Conference champion; Rankings from AP Poll

=== Major independents ===
1956 Eastern major college football independents records
	Conf.			Overall
Team	W	L	T	W		L		T
No. 8 Syracuse		–		7	–	2	–	0
Penn State		–		6	–	2	–	1
No. 13 Pittsburgh		–		7	–	3	–	1
Army		–		5	–	3	–	1
Holy Cross		–		5	–	3	–	1
Villanova		–		5	–	4	–	0
Boston College		–		5	–	4	–	0
Colgate		–		4	–	5	–	0
Boston University		–		1	–	5	–	2
Rankings from AP poll

1956 Midwestern major college football independents records
	Conf.			Overall
Team	W	L	T	W		L		T
Cincinnati		–		4	–	5	–	0
Dayton		–		4	–	6	–	0
Drake		–		3	–	6	–	0
Notre Dame		–		2	–	8	–	0
Marquette		–		0	–	9	–	0

1956 Southern major college football independents records
	Conf.			Overall
Team	W	L	T	W		L		T
No. 6 Miami (FL)		–		8	–	1	–	1
No. 16 Navy		–		6	–	1	–	2
Florida State		–		5	–	4	–	1
Texas Tech		–		2	–	7	–	1
Rankings from AP poll

1956 Western major college football independents records
	Conf.			Overall
Team	W	L	T	W		L		T
Air Force		–		6	–	2	–	1
Pacific (CA)		–		6	–	3	–	1
San Jose State		–		2	–	7	–	1

=== Minor conference standings ===
1956 California Collegiate Athletic Association football standings
	Conf.					Overall
Team	W		L		T	W		L		T
Fresno State	2	–	0	–	0	8	–	2	–	0
San Diego State	2	–	1	–	0	4	–	3	–	2
Santa Barbara	2	–	1	–	0	5	–	5	–	0
Los Angeles State	1	–	1	–	0	3	–	5	–	1
Cal Poly	1	–	2	–	0	7	–	3	–	0
Long Beach State	0	–	3	–	0	3	–	5	–	0
No champion named for the 1956 season

1956 Central Intercollegiate Athletic Association football standings
	Conf.					Overall
Team	W		L		T	W		L		T
North Carolina College +	5	–	0	–	2	5	–	2	–	2
Delaware State +	5	–	0	–	1	7	–	1	–	1
Morgan State +	5	–	0	–	1	5	–	2	–	1
Maryland State	5	–	1	–	1	6	–	2	–	1
St. Augustine's	5	–	1	–	1	6	–	1	–	1
Bluefield State	5	–	1	–	0	6	–	3	–	0
Virginia Union	4	–	3	–	0	6	–	3	–	0
North Carolina A&T	3	–	3	–	0	4	–	4	–	0
Winston-Salem State	3	–	3	–	1	4	–	4	–	1
Shaw	3	–	4	–	1	3	–	4	–	1
Fayetteville State	3	–	3	–	0	3	–	4	–	0
Hampton	2	–	7	–	1	2	–	7	–	1
Howard	2	–	4	–	0	4	–	5	–	0
Johnson C. Smith	2	–	5	–	0	3	–	5	–	0
Virginia State	1	–	6	–	1	1	–	7	–	1
Lincoln (PA)	1	–	6	–	0	1	–	6	–	0
Saint Paul's (VA)	0	–	7	–	0	1	–	7	–	0
+ – Conference co-champions; Conference standings were based on the Dickinson System.

1956 Central Intercollegiate Conference football standings
	Conf.					Overall
Team	W		L		T	W		L		T
St. Benedict's $	4	–	1	–	0	7	–	3	–	0
Pittsburg State	3	–	1	–	1	7	–	2	–	1
Southwestern (KS)	3	–	1	–	1	4	–	4	–	2
Washburn	3	–	2	–	0	3	–	6	–	0
Emporia State	1	–	4	–	0	2	–	6	–	1
Fort Hays State	0	–	5	–	1	1	–	8	–	0
$ – Conference champion

1956 College Conference of Illinois football standings
	Conf.					Overall
Team	W		L		T	W		L		T
Wheaton (IL) $	7	–	0	–	0	7	–	1	–	0
Millikin	6	–	1	–	0	6	–	2	–	0
Carroll (WI)	5	–	2	–	0	5	–	3	–	0
Lake Forest	3	–	3	–	1	3	–	4	–	1
Illinois Wesleyan	3	–	3	–	1	3	–	5	–	1
North Central (IL)	1	–	6	–	0	2	–	6	–	0
Elmhurst	1	–	6	–	0	1	–	6	–	0
Augustana (IL)	1	–	6	–	0	1	–	7	–	0
$ – Conference champion

1956 Eastern Intercollegiate Athletic Conference football standings
	Conf.					Overall
Team	W		L		T	W		L		T
Voorhees $	5	–	0	–	0	6	–	1	–	0
South Carolina Trade	3	–	2	–	0	?	–	?	–	0
Friendship	2	–	2	–	0	2	–	3	–	1
Livingstone	2	–	4	–	0	4	–	4	–	0
Norfolk State	1	–	4	–	0	2	–	6	–	0
Morristown	1	–	4	–	0	?	–	?	–	?
Elizabeth City State	2	–	0	–	0	3	–	6	–	0
$ – Conference champion; Elizabeth City State was ineligible for the conference title.

1956 Far Western Conference football standings
	Conf.					Overall
Team	W		L		T	W		L		T
Humboldt State +	4	–	1	–	0	9	–	2	–	0
Cal Aggies +	4	–	1	–	0	7	–	2	–	0
San Francisco State +	4	–	1	–	0	5	–	5	–	0
Chico State	1	–	3	–	1	2	–	6	–	1
Sacramento State	1	–	4	–	0	3	–	5	–	1
Nevada	0	–	4	–	1	0	–	7	–	1
+ – Conference co-champions

1956 Gulf Coast Conference football standings
	Conf.					Overall
Team	W		L		T	W		L		T
North Texas State +	2	–	0	–	1	7	–	2	–	1
Trinity (TX) +	2	–	0	–	1	5	–	3	–	1
Abilene Christian	1	–	2	–	0	4	–	6	–	0
Midwestern (TX)	0	–	3	–	0	3	–	7	–	0
+ – Conference co-champions

1956 Gulf States Conference football standings
	Conf.					Overall
Team	W		L		T	W		L		T
Southeastern Louisiana $	4	–	1	–	0	6	–	3	–	0
Northwestern State	3	–	1	–	1	6	–	2	–	2
Louisiana Tech	3	–	1	–	1	4	–	3	–	2
Northeast Louisiana State	2	–	3	–	0	7	–	3	–	0
McNeese State	2	–	3	–	0	5	–	5	–	0
Southwestern Louisiana	1	–	4	–	0	4	–	6	–	0
$ – Conference champion

1956 Hoosier Conference football standings
	Conf.					Overall
Team	W		L		T	W		L		T
Hanover $	6	–	0	–	0	8	–	1	–	0
Anderson (IN)	5	–	1	–	0	6	–	2	–	0
Indiana Central	4	–	2	–	0	4	–	5	–	0
Franklin (IN)	3	–	3	–	0	5	–	4	–	0
Manchester (IN)	2	–	4	–	0	3	–	6	–	0
Taylor	1	–	5	–	0	3	–	6	–	0
Earlham	0	–	6	–	0	1	–	7	–	0
$ – Conference champion

1956 Indiana Collegiate Conference football standings
	Conf.					Overall
Team	W		L		T	W		L		T
Saint Joseph's (IN) $^	6	–	0	–	0	8	–	1	–	1
Butler	5	–	1	–	0	6	–	2	–	0
Valparaiso	4	–	2	–	0	6	–	4	–	0
Evansville	3	–	3	–	0	4	–	5	–	0
Ball State	2	–	4	–	0	4	–	4	–	0
DePauw	1	–	5	–	0	1	–	6	–	1
Indiana State	0	–	6	–	0	2	–	6	–	0
$ – Conference champion; ^ – NAIA playoff (Aluminum Bowl) participant

1956 Interstate Intercollegiate Athletic Conference football standings
	Conf.					Overall
Team	W		L		T	W		L		T
Central Michigan $	6	–	0	–	0	9	–	0	–	0
Western Illinois	4	–	2	–	0	6	–	3	–	0
Eastern Michigan	3	–	3	–	0	4	–	4	–	0
Illinois State Normal	3	–	3	–	0	4	–	4	–	1
Southern Illinois	3	–	3	–	0	4	–	5	–	0
Eastern Illinois	2	–	4	–	0	2	–	7	–	0
Northern Illinois State	0	–	6	–	0	1	–	8	–	0
$ – Conference champion

1956 Iowa Conference football standings
	Conf.					Overall
Team	W		L		T	W		L		T
Central (IA) $	7	–	1	–	0	7	–	1	–	0
Simpson (IA)	5	–	2	–	1	5	–	2	–	1
Luther	5	–	2	–	1	5	–	3	–	1
Iowa Wesleyan	5	–	3	–	0	5	–	4	–	0
Dubuque	3	–	3	–	2	3	–	3	–	2
Parsons	3	–	5	–	0	5	–	5	–	0
Buena Vista	3	–	5	–	0	3	–	5	–	1
Upper Iowa	1	–	6	–	1	2	–	6	–	2
Wartburg	0	–	7	–	1	0	–	7	–	1
$ – Conference champion

1956 Lone Star Conference football standings
	Conf.					Overall
Team	W		L		T	W		L		T
Sam Houston State $	6	–	0	–	0	10	–	0	–	0
Texas A&I	5	–	1	–	0	7	–	3	–	0
Southwest Texas State	4	–	2	–	0	6	–	3	–	0
Stephen F. Austin	3	–	3	–	0	4	–	6	–	0
Lamar Tech	2	–	4	–	0	4	–	4	–	1
East Texas State	1	–	5	–	0	2	–	8	–	0
Sul Ross	0	–	6	–	0	1	–	9	–	0
$ – Conference champion

1956 Mason–Dixon Conference football standings
	Conf.					Overall
Team	W		L		T	W		L		T
Johns Hopkins $	3	–	0	–	0	4	–	3	–	1
Hampden–Sydney	3	–	1	–	0	7	–	2	–	0
Randolph–Macon	2	–	2	–	0	4	–	4	–	0
Gallaudet	0	–	0	–	1	0	–	5	–	1
Bridgewater	0	–	2	–	1	3	–	4	–	1
Western Maryland	0	–	3	–	0	1	–	8	–	0
$ – Conference champion

1956 Michigan Intercollegiate Athletic Association football standings
	Conf.					Overall
Team	W		L		T	W		L		T
Hillsdale $	6	–	0	–	0	9	–	0	–	0
Kalamazoo	5	–	1	–	0	5	–	3	–	0
Hope	4	–	2	–	0	4	–	4	–	0
Albion	3	–	3	–	0	3	–	5	–	0
Adrian	2	–	4	–	0	3	–	5	–	0
Alma	1	–	5	–	0	2	–	7	–	0
Olivet	0	–	6	–	0	0	–	8	–	0
$ – Conference champion

1956 Mid-American Conference football standings
	Conf.					Overall
Team	W		L		T	W		L		T
Bowling Green $	5	–	0	–	1	8	–	0	–	1
Miami (OH)	4	–	0	–	1	7	–	1	–	1
Kent State	4	–	2	–	0	7	–	2	–	0
Marshall	2	–	4	–	0	3	–	6	–	0
Ohio	2	–	4	–	0	2	–	7	–	0
Western Michigan	1	–	4	–	0	2	–	7	–	0
Toledo	1	–	5	–	0	1	–	7	–	1
$ – Conference champion

1956 Mid-Ohio League football standings
	Conf.					Overall
Team	W		L		T	W		L		T
Bluffton $	5	–	0	–	0	8	–	1	–	0
Findlay	4	–	1	–	0	7	–	2	–	0
Wilmington (OH)	3	–	2	–	0	3	–	4	–	0
Ashland	2	–	3	–	0	3	–	5	–	0
Ohio Northern	0	–	4	–	1	0	–	7	–	1
Defiance	0	–	4	–	1	0	–	8	–	1
$ – Conference champion

1956 Midwest Athletic Association football standings
	Conf.					Overall
Team	W		L		T	W		L		T
No. 1 Tennessee A&I $	4	–	0	–	0	10	–	0	–	0
No. 3 Grambling	1	–	1	–	0	8	–	1	–	0
No. 7 Jackson State	1	–	1	–	0	6	–	2	–	2
No. 14 Central State (OH)	1	–	1	–	1	4	–	3	–	1
Lincoln (MO)	1	–	2	–	0	5	–	4	–	0
Kentucky State	0	–	3	–	1	3	–	5	–	1
$ – Conference champion; Rankings from Pittsburgh Courier

1956 Midwest Conference football standings
	Conf.					Overall
Team	W		L		T	W		L		T
Carleton +	6	–	2	–	0	6	–	2	–	0
Knox +	6	–	2	–	0	6	–	2	–	0
St. Olaf +	6	–	2	–	0	6	–	2	–	0
Ripon	4	–	3	–	1	4	–	3	–	1
Coe	4	–	4	–	0	4	–	4	–	0
Lawrence	4	–	4	–	0	4	–	4	–	0
Cornell (IA)	3	–	5	–	0	3	–	5	–	0
Monmouth (IL)	1	–	6	–	1	1	–	6	–	1
Grinnell	1	–	7	–	0	1	–	7	–	0
+ – Conference co-champions

1956 Minnesota Intercollegiate Athletic Conference football standings
	Conf.					Overall
Team	W		L		T	W		L		T
St. Thomas (MN) $	7	–	0	–	0	8	–	0	–	0
Concordia (MN)	5	–	2	–	0	6	–	3	–	0
Macalester	4	–	3	–	0	5	–	3	–	0
Gustavus Adolphus	4	–	3	–	0	4	–	5	–	0
Minnesota–Duluth	3	–	4	–	0	3	–	4	–	0
Saint John's (MN)	2	–	4	–	1	3	–	4	–	1
Augsburg	2	–	4	–	1	2	–	5	–	1
Hamline	0	–	7	–	0	1	–	7	–	0
$ – Conference champion

1956 Minnesota State College Conference football standings
	Conf.					Overall
Team	W		L		T	W		L		T
Winona State $	3	–	1	–	0	4	–	4	–	0
St. Cloud State	2	–	1	–	1	6	–	2	–	1
Moorhead State	2	–	1	–	1	3	–	3	–	1
Mankato State	1	–	2	–	1	6	–	2	–	1
Bemidji State	0	–	3	–	1	2	–	4	–	2
$ – Conference champion; St. Cloud State forfeited a win over Moorhead State and Moorhead State forfeited a win over Winona State.

1956 Missouri Intercollegiate Athletic Association football standings
	Conf.					Overall
Team	W		L		T	W		L		T
Central Missouri State +	4	–	1	–	0	7	–	2	–	0
Missouri–Rolla +	4	–	1	–	0	6	–	3	–	0
NE Missouri State	3	–	2	–	0	3	–	5	–	0
SW Missouri State	3	–	2	–	0	3	–	6	–	0
NW Missouri State	1	–	4	–	0	2	–	7	–	0
SE Missouri State	0	–	5	–	0	2	–	7	–	0
+ – Conference co-champions

1956 North Central Conference football standings
	Conf.					Overall
Team	W		L		T	W		L		T
Morningside $	4	–	1	–	1	6	–	1	–	1
Augustana (SD)	4	–	2	–	0	6	–	3	–	0
South Dakota	4	–	2	–	0	4	–	4	–	0
North Dakota State	3	–	3	–	0	5	–	4	–	0
South Dakota State	3	–	3	–	0	4	–	5	–	0
North Dakota	2	–	4	–	0	2	–	6	–	0
Iowa State Teachers	0	–	5	–	1	2	–	5	–	1
$ – Conference champion

1956 Ohio Athletic Conference football standings
	Conf.					Overall
Team	W		L		T	W		L		T
Heidelberg $	5	–	1	–	0	8	–	1	–	0
Hiram	4	–	1	–	0	5	–	3	–	0
Denison	5	–	2	–	0	7	–	2	–	0
Muskingum	5	–	2	–	1	5	–	2	–	1
Wittenberg	5	–	2	–	1	5	–	2	–	1
Capital	4	–	2	–	1	5	–	2	–	1
Wooster	4	–	3	–	1	5	–	3	–	1
Otterbein	3	–	4	–	0	4	–	5	–	0
Akron	3	–	5	–	1	3	–	5	–	1
Kenyon	1	–	3	–	1	1	–	5	–	1
Mount Union	2	–	5	–	0	2	–	6	–	0
Oberlin	1	–	4	–	1	1	–	6	–	1
Ohio Wesleyan	1	–	4	–	1	1	–	7	–	1
Marietta	0	–	5	–	0	0	–	7	–	0
$ – Conference champion

1956 Ohio Valley Conference football standings
	Conf.					Overall
Team	W		L		T	W		L		T
Middle Tennessee $	5	–	0	–	0	7	–	2	–	0
Murray State	4	–	1	–	0	6	–	4	–	0
Western Kentucky	2	–	3	–	0	5	–	4	–	0
Tennessee Tech	2	–	3	–	0	5	–	4	–	1
Eastern Kentucky	2	–	3	–	0	4	–	5	–	0
Morehead State	0	–	5	–	0	2	–	6	–	0
$ – Conference champion

1956 Pennsylvania State Teachers College Conference football standings
	Conf.					Overall
Team	W		L		T	W		L		T
West Chester $	4	–	0	–	0	7	–	1	–	0
East Stroudsburg	6	–	1	–	0	7	–	2	–	0
Indiana (PA)	4	–	1	–	0	5	–	4	–	0
Slippery Rock	2	–	1	–	0	2	–	5	–	0
Shippensburg	5	–	1	–	0	6	–	2	–	0
Lock Haven	4	–	2	–	0	6	–	2	–	0
Edinboro	3	–	2	–	0	5	–	4	–	0
Clarion	2	–	3	–	0	2	–	6	–	0
Millersville	2	–	5	–	0	2	–	6	–	0
Kutztown	1	–	3	–	0	5	–	4	–	0
Bloomsburg	1	–	3	–	0	5	–	2	–	1
California (PA)	1	–	6	–	0	2	–	7	–	0
Mansfield	1	–	4	–	0	2	–	5	–	0
Cheyney	0	–	4	–	0	1	–	6	–	0
$ – Conference champion; Conference standings were based on the Saylor system of ratings.

1956 Presidents' Athletic Conference football standings
	Conf.					Overall
Team	W		L		T	W		L		T
Wayne State (MI) $	3	–	0	–	1	4	–	2	–	1
John Carroll	2	–	0	–	1	4	–	1	–	2
Western Reserve	1	–	2	–	0	4	–	3	–	0
Case Tech	0	–	4	–	0	1	–	6	–	0
$ – Conference champion

1956 Rocky Mountain Conference football standings
	Conf.					Overall
Team	W		L		T	W		L		T
Montana State $^	5	–	0	–	0	9	–	0	–	1
Idaho State	3	–	2	–	0	6	–	3	–	0
Colorado State–Greeley	3	–	2	–	0	5	–	4	–	0
Western State (CO)	3	–	2	–	0	5	–	5	–	0
Colorado College	1	–	4	–	0	2	–	7	–	0
Colorado Mines	0	–	5	–	0	2	–	7	–	0
$ – Conference champion; ^ – NAIA playoff participant

1956 Southeastern Athletic Conference football standings
	Conf.					Overall
Team	W		L		T	W		L		T
Savannah State $	4	–	1	–	0	4	–	4	–	0
Florida Normal	4	–	1	–	0	5	–	3	–	0
Claflin	3	–	2	–	0	4	–	4	–	0
Albany State	2	–	2	–	1	3	–	3	–	2
Morris	1	–	3	–	1	1	–	7	–	1
Paine	0	–	5	–	0	0	–	6	–	0
$ – Conference champion; Standings were based on Dickinson System ratings.

1956 Southern California Intercollegiate Athletic Conference football standings
	Conf.					Overall
Team	W		L		T	W		L		T
Redlands $	4	–	0	–	0	9	–	0	–	0
Pomona-Claremont	2	–	1	–	1	4	–	3	–	1
Whittier	2	–	1	–	1	4	–	3	–	3
Occidental	1	–	3	–	0	3	–	6	–	0
Caltech	0	–	4	–	0	3	–	5	–	0
$ – Conference champion

1956 Southern Intercollegiate Athletic Conference football standings
	Conf.					Overall
Team	W		L		T	W		L		T
Florida A&M $	5	–	0	–	0	8	–	1	–	0
Bethune–Cookman	4	–	2	–	0	6	–	3	–	0
Allen	5	–	1	–	1	7	–	1	–	1
Morris Brown	4	–	2	–	0	5	–	3	–	0
Xavier (LA)	4	–	2	–	0	6	–	3	–	0
Tuskegee	5	–	2	–	0	6	–	3	–	0
Clark (GA)	3	–	4	–	0	4	–	4	–	0
Knoxville	3	–	3	–	0	4	–	5	–	0
South Carolina State	3	–	4	–	0	5	–	4	–	0
Alabama State	3	–	4	–	1	4	–	4	–	1
Benedict	2	–	3	–	0	4	–	3	–	0
Fisk	2	–	3	–	0	2	–	5	–	0
Fort Valley State	2	–	5	–	1	3	–	5	–	1
Alabama A&M	2	–	5	–	1	2	–	5	–	1
Morehouse	1	–	5	–	0	1	–	7	–	0
Lane	0	–	3	–	0	3	–	5	–	0
$ – Conference champion; Standings were based on Dickinson System ratings.

1956 Southwestern Athletic Conference football standings
	Conf.					Overall
Team	W		L		T	W		L		T
Texas Southern +	5	–	1	–	0	9	–	2	–	0
Wiley +	5	–	1	–	0	6	–	3	–	1
Southern	4	–	2	–	0	5	–	5	–	0
Prairie View A&M	4	–	2	–	0	5	–	5	–	0
Langston	2	–	4	–	0	3	–	7	–	0
Arkansas AM&N	0	–	5	–	1	2	–	6	–	1
Texas College	0	–	5	–	1	2	–	6	–	1
+ – Conference co-champions

1956 Virginia Little Eight Conference football standings
	Conf.					Overall
Team	W		L		T	W		L		T
Emory and Henry $	2	–	0	–	0	9	–	1	–	0
Hampden–Sydney	2	–	1	–	0	7	–	2	–	0
Randolph–Macon	1	–	2	–	0	4	–	4	–	0
Bridgewater	0	–	2	–	0	3	–	4	–	1
$ – Conference champion

1956 Wisconsin State College Conference football standings
	Conf.					Overall
Team	W		L		T	W		L		T
Eau Claire State +	7	–	0	–	0	7	–	1	–	0
Platteville State +	5	–	0	–	0	5	–	1	–	0
River Falls State	4	–	1	–	0	6	–	2	–	0
Stevens Point State	3	–	3	–	0	4	–	4	–	0
Whitewater State	2	–	3	–	0	4	–	4	–	0
Superior State	2	–	3	–	0	4	–	5	–	0
La Crosse State	2	–	3	–	0	3	–	6	–	0
Oshkosh State	2	–	4	–	0	3	–	4	–	0
Stout State	0	–	5	–	0	1	–	7	–	0
Milwaukee	0	–	5	–	0	0	–	8	–	0
+ – Conference co-champions

1956 Yankee Conference football standings
	Conf.					Overall
Team	W		L		T	W		L		T
Connecticut $	3	–	0	–	1	6	–	2	–	1
Maine	3	–	1	–	0	5	–	2	–	0
New Hampshire	2	–	1	–	1	3	–	4	–	1
Vermont	1	–	2	–	0	2	–	5	–	0
UMass	1	–	3	–	0	2	–	5	–	1
Rhode Island	1	–	4	–	0	2	–	6	–	0
$ – Conference champion

=== Non-major independents ===
1956 Eastern non-major college football independents records
	Conf.			Overall
Team	W	L	T	W		L		T
Alfred		–		8	–	0	–	0
Hofstra		–		7	–	3	–	0
Franklin & Marshall		–		5	–	2	–	1
Buffalo		–		5	–	3	–	0
Drexel		–		5	–	3	–	0
Washington & Jefferson		–		3	–	4	–	1
Bucknell		–		3	–	5	–	0
Carnegie Tech		–		3	–	5	–	0
Temple		–		3	–	5	–	0

1956 Midwestern non-major college football independents records
	Conf.			Overall
Team	W	L	T	W		L		T
Northern Michigan		–		7	–	0	–	1
St. Norbert		–		8	–	1	–	0
Carthage		–		8	–	2	–	0
Wabash		–		6	–	2	–	1
Xavier		–		7	–	3	–	0
Washington University		–		6	–	3	–	0
Baldwin–Wallace		–		4	–	5	–	0
Rose Poly		–		3	–	4	–	0

1956 Southern non-major college football independents records
	Conf.			Overall
Team	W	L	T	W		L		T
Tampa		–		7	–	2	–	0
Mississippi Southern		–		7	–	2	–	1
Louisville		–		6	–	3	–	0
Delaware		–		5	–	3	–	1
Memphis State		–		5	–	4	–	1
Arkansas State		–		5	–	4	–	0
Chattanooga		–		5	–	4	–	0
Howard (AL)		–		2	–	5	–	2
Sewanee		–		1	–	6	–	1

1956 Western non-major college football independents records
	Conf.			Overall
Team	W	L	T	W		L		T
Cal Poly San Dimas		–		6	–	2	–	0
Hawaii		–		7	–	3	–	0
Pepperdine		–		6	–	3	–	0
La Verne		–		6	–	4	–	0
UC Riverside		–		1	–	6	–	0

=== NAIA standings ===
1956 Badger-Illini Conference football standings
	Conf.					Overall
Team	W		L		T	W		L		T
Milton $	5	–	0	–	0	6	–	0	–	0
Lakeland	3	–	2	–	0	3	–	4	–	0
Northwestern (WI)	3	–	2	–	0	?	–	?	–	?
Wisconsin Tech	3	–	2	–	0	?	–	?	–	?
Concordia (IL)	1	–	4	–	0	1	–	6	–	0
St. Procopius	0	–	5	–	0	0	–	5	–	0
$ – Conference champion

1956 Central Church College Conference football standings
	Conf.					Overall
Team	W		L		T	W		L		T
Tarkio $	3	–	0	–	0	7	–	1	–	0
Westmar	2	–	1	–	0	2	–	4	–	2
Concordia (NE)	1	–	2	–	0	2	–	6	–	0
Dana	0	–	3	–	0	0	–	6	–	0
$ – Conference champion

1956 Central Intercollegiate Conference football standings
	Conf.					Overall
Team	W		L		T	W		L		T
St. Benedict's $	4	–	1	–	0	7	–	3	–	0
Pittsburg State	3	–	1	–	1	7	–	2	–	1
Southwestern (KS)	3	–	1	–	1	4	–	4	–	2
Washburn	3	–	2	–	0	3	–	6	–	0
Emporia State	1	–	4	–	0	2	–	6	–	1
Fort Hays State	0	–	5	–	1	1	–	8	–	0
$ – Conference champion

1956 College Conference of Illinois football standings
	Conf.					Overall
Team	W		L		T	W		L		T
Wheaton (IL) $	7	–	0	–	0	7	–	1	–	0
Millikin	6	–	1	–	0	6	–	2	–	0
Carroll (WI)	5	–	2	–	0	5	–	3	–	0
Lake Forest	3	–	3	–	1	3	–	4	–	1
Illinois Wesleyan	3	–	3	–	1	3	–	5	–	1
North Central (IL)	1	–	6	–	0	2	–	6	–	0
Elmhurst	1	–	6	–	0	1	–	6	–	0
Augustana (IL)	1	–	6	–	0	1	–	7	–	0
$ – Conference champion

1956 Evergreen Conference football standings
	Conf.					Overall
Team	W		L		T	W		L		T
Puget Sound $	6	–	0	–	0	8	–	0	–	1
Eastern Washington	3	–	2	–	1	5	–	2	–	1
Whitworth	3	–	3	–	0	5	–	4	–	0
Pacific Lutheran	3	–	3	–	0	3	–	3	–	1
Central Washington	2	–	3	–	1	3	–	4	–	1
Western Washington	2	–	4	–	0	2	–	6	–	0
UBC	1	–	5	–	0	?	–	?	–	?
$ – Conference champion

1956 Frontier Conference football standings
	Conf.					Overall
Team	W		L		T	W		L		T
Arizona State–Flagstaff +	3	–	0	–	0	8	–	2	–	0
New Mexico Military +	3	–	0	–	0	6	–	3	–	0
New Mexico Highlands	2	–	2	–	0	5	–	2	–	1
New Mexico Western	1	–	3	–	0	5	–	4	–	0
Panhandle A&M	0	–	4	–	0	3	–	7	–	0
+ – Conference co-champions

1956 Indiana Collegiate Conference football standings
	Conf.					Overall
Team	W		L		T	W		L		T
Saint Joseph's (IN) $^	6	–	0	–	0	8	–	1	–	1
Butler	5	–	1	–	0	6	–	2	–	0
Valparaiso	4	–	2	–	0	6	–	4	–	0
Evansville	3	–	3	–	0	4	–	5	–	0
Ball State	2	–	4	–	0	4	–	4	–	0
DePauw	1	–	5	–	0	1	–	6	–	1
Indiana State	0	–	6	–	0	2	–	6	–	0
$ – Conference champion; ^ – NAIA playoff (Aluminum Bowl) participant

1956 Iowa Conference football standings
	Conf.					Overall
Team	W		L		T	W		L		T
Central (IA) $	7	–	1	–	0	7	–	1	–	0
Simpson (IA)	5	–	2	–	1	5	–	2	–	1
Luther	5	–	2	–	1	5	–	3	–	1
Iowa Wesleyan	5	–	3	–	0	5	–	4	–	0
Dubuque	3	–	3	–	2	3	–	3	–	2
Parsons	3	–	5	–	0	5	–	5	–	0
Buena Vista	3	–	5	–	0	3	–	5	–	1
Upper Iowa	1	–	6	–	1	2	–	6	–	2
Wartburg	0	–	7	–	1	0	–	7	–	1
$ – Conference champion

1956 Kansas Collegiate Athletic Conference football standings
	Conf.					Overall
Team	W		L		T	W		L		T
Kansas Wesleyan $	7	–	0	–	0	8	–	1	–	0
College of Emporia	6	–	1	–	0	7	–	2	–	0
McPherson	5	–	2	–	0	5	–	4	–	0
Bethel (KS)	4	–	3	–	0	4	–	5	–	0
Baker	3	–	4	–	0	4	–	5	–	0
Friends	2	–	5	–	0	2	–	6	–	1
Bethany (KS)	1	–	6	–	0	1	–	7	–	0
Ottawa	0	–	7	–	0	0	–	9	–	0
$ – Conference champion

1956 Michigan Intercollegiate Athletic Association football standings
	Conf.					Overall
Team	W		L		T	W		L		T
Hillsdale $	6	–	0	–	0	9	–	0	–	0
Kalamazoo	5	–	1	–	0	5	–	3	–	0
Hope	4	–	2	–	0	4	–	4	–	0
Albion	3	–	3	–	0	3	–	5	–	0
Adrian	2	–	4	–	0	3	–	5	–	0
Alma	1	–	5	–	0	2	–	7	–	0
Olivet	0	–	6	–	0	0	–	8	–	0
$ – Conference champion

1956 Mid-Ohio League football standings
	Conf.					Overall
Team	W		L		T	W		L		T
Bluffton $	5	–	0	–	0	8	–	1	–	0
Findlay	4	–	1	–	0	7	–	2	–	0
Wilmington (OH)	3	–	2	–	0	3	–	4	–	0
Ashland	2	–	3	–	0	3	–	5	–	0
Ohio Northern	0	–	4	–	1	0	–	7	–	1
Defiance	0	–	4	–	1	0	–	8	–	1
$ – Conference champion

1956 Midwest Conference football standings
	Conf.					Overall
Team	W		L		T	W		L		T
Carleton +	6	–	2	–	0	6	–	2	–	0
Knox +	6	–	2	–	0	6	–	2	–	0
St. Olaf +	6	–	2	–	0	6	–	2	–	0
Ripon	4	–	3	–	1	4	–	3	–	1
Coe	4	–	4	–	0	4	–	4	–	0
Lawrence	4	–	4	–	0	4	–	4	–	0
Cornell (IA)	3	–	5	–	0	3	–	5	–	0
Monmouth (IL)	1	–	6	–	1	1	–	6	–	1
Grinnell	1	–	7	–	0	1	–	7	–	0
+ – Conference co-champions

1956 Minnesota Intercollegiate Athletic Conference football standings
	Conf.					Overall
Team	W		L		T	W		L		T
St. Thomas (MN) $	7	–	0	–	0	8	–	0	–	0
Concordia (MN)	5	–	2	–	0	6	–	3	–	0
Macalester	4	–	3	–	0	5	–	3	–	0
Gustavus Adolphus	4	–	3	–	0	4	–	5	–	0
Minnesota–Duluth	3	–	4	–	0	3	–	4	–	0
Saint John's (MN)	2	–	4	–	1	3	–	4	–	1
Augsburg	2	–	4	–	1	2	–	5	–	1
Hamline	0	–	7	–	0	1	–	7	–	0
$ – Conference champion

1956 Minnesota State College Conference football standings
	Conf.					Overall
Team	W		L		T	W		L		T
Winona State $	3	–	1	–	0	4	–	4	–	0
St. Cloud State	2	–	1	–	1	6	–	2	–	1
Moorhead State	2	–	1	–	1	3	–	3	–	1
Mankato State	1	–	2	–	1	6	–	2	–	1
Bemidji State	0	–	3	–	1	2	–	4	–	2
$ – Conference champion; St. Cloud State forfeited a win over Moorhead State and Moorhead State forfeited a win over Winona State.

1956 Missouri College Athletic Union football standings
	Conf.					Overall
Team	W		L		T	W		L		T
William Jewell $	1	–	0	–	1	6	–	3	–	1
Tarkio	2	–	1	–	0	7	–	1	–	0
Missouri Valley	0	–	0	–	1	8	–	2	–	1
Culver–Stockton	1	–	1	–	0	6	–	3	–	0
Central (MO)	0	–	2	–	0	1	–	8	–	0
$ – Conference champion

1956 Montana Collegiate Conference football standings
	Conf.					Overall
Team	W		L		T	W		L		T
Carroll (MT) $	4	–	0	–	0	6	–	2	–	0
Eastern Montana	2	–	1	–	1	3	–	2	–	1
Rocky Mountain	2	–	2	–	0	2	–	4	–	1
Western Montana	1	–	3	–	0	?	–	?	–	?
Montana Mines	0	–	3	–	1	?	–	?	–	?
$ – Conference champion

1956 Nebraska College Conference football standings
	Conf.					Overall
Team	W		L		T	W		L		T
Kearney State $	7	–	0	–	0	9	–	0	–	0
Hastings	5	–	1	–	0	5	–	2	–	0
Peru State	5	–	2	–	0	6	–	3	–	0
Chadron State	3	–	2	–	1	5	–	2	–	1
Nebraska Wesleyan	3	–	4	–	0	3	–	7	–	0
Doane	2	–	4	–	1	4	–	4	–	1
Midland	1	–	6	–	0	2	–	6	–	0
Wayne State (NE)	0	–	7	–	0	1	–	8	–	0
$ – Conference champion

1956 North Dakota Intercollegiate Conference football standings
	Conf.					Overall
Team	W		L		T	W		L		T
Jamestown $	4	–	1	–	1	4	–	2	–	1
Mayville State	4	–	2	–	0	4	–	3	–	0
Dickinson State	4	–	2	–	0	4	–	2	–	0
Wahpeton Science	3	–	2	–	1	4	–	2	–	1
Minot State	3	–	2	–	1	3	–	3	–	1
Bismarck JC	3	–	3	–	0	3	–	3	–	0
Valley City State	1	–	2	–	3	1	–	4	–	3
Ellendale	2	–	4	–	0	2	–	4	–	0
Bottineau	0	–	6	–	0	0	–	6	–	0
$ – Conference champion

1956 North State Conference football standings
	Conf.					Overall
Team	W		L		T	W		L		T
Lenoir Rhyne $	6	–	0	–	0	10	–	0	–	0
Catawba	4	–	2	–	0	5	–	4	–	1
Elon	4	–	2	–	0	5	–	5	–	0
Appalachian State	3	–	3	–	0	3	–	6	–	0
East Carolina	2	–	3	–	0	2	–	7	–	1
Guilford	0	–	4	–	0	1	–	7	–	0
Western Carolina	0	–	5	–	0	1	–	9	–	0
$ – Conference champion

1956 Northwest Conference football standings
	Conf.					Overall
Team	W		L		T	W		L		T
Linfield $	3	–	1	–	1	6	–	1	–	2
Lewis & Clark	3	–	2	–	0	7	–	3	–	0
Willamette	2	–	1	–	2	2	–	4	–	2
Whitman	2	–	2	–	1	4	–	4	–	1
College of Idaho	2	–	3	–	0	4	–	5	–	0
Pacific (OR)	1	–	4	–	0	3	–	6	–	0
$ – Conference champion

1956 Oklahoma Collegiate Conference football standings
	Conf.					Overall
Team	W		L		T	W		L		T
Northeastern State +	4	–	1	–	0	8	–	2	–	0
Central State (OK) +	4	–	1	–	0	7	–	2	–	0
SW Oklahoma State	3	–	1	–	1	5	–	3	–	1
East Central	2	–	3	–	0	2	–	7	–	0
SE Oklahoma State	1	–	3	–	1	4	–	3	–	0
NW Oklahoma State	0	–	5	–	0	4	–	5	–	0
+ – Conference co-champions

1956 Oregon Collegiate Conference football standings
	Conf.					Overall
Team	W		L		T	W		L		T
Eastern Oregon $	4	–	0	–	0	5	–	3	–	0
Southern Oregon	2	–	2	–	0	4	–	5	–	0
Oregon College	2	–	2	–	0	3	–	4	–	0
Portland State	1	–	3	–	0	2	–	5	–	1
Oregon Tech	1	–	3	–	0	4	–	4	–	1
$ – Conference champion

1956 Pennsylvania State Teachers College Conference football standings
	Conf.					Overall
Team	W		L		T	W		L		T
West Chester $	4	–	0	–	0	7	–	1	–	0
East Stroudsburg	6	–	1	–	0	7	–	2	–	0
Indiana (PA)	4	–	1	–	0	5	–	4	–	0
Slippery Rock	2	–	1	–	0	2	–	5	–	0
Shippensburg	5	–	1	–	0	6	–	2	–	0
Lock Haven	4	–	2	–	0	6	–	2	–	0
Edinboro	3	–	2	–	0	5	–	4	–	0
Clarion	2	–	3	–	0	2	–	6	–	0
Millersville	2	–	5	–	0	2	–	6	–	0
Kutztown	1	–	3	–	0	5	–	4	–	0
Bloomsburg	1	–	3	–	0	5	–	2	–	1
California (PA)	1	–	6	–	0	2	–	7	–	0
Mansfield	1	–	4	–	0	2	–	5	–	0
Cheyney	0	–	4	–	0	1	–	6	–	0
$ – Conference champion; Conference standings were based on the Saylor system of ratings.

1956 Rocky Mountain Conference football standings
	Conf.					Overall
Team	W		L		T	W		L		T
Montana State $^	5	–	0	–	0	9	–	0	–	1
Idaho State	3	–	2	–	0	6	–	3	–	0
Colorado State–Greeley	3	–	2	–	0	5	–	4	–	0
Western State (CO)	3	–	2	–	0	5	–	5	–	0
Colorado College	1	–	4	–	0	2	–	7	–	0
Colorado Mines	0	–	5	–	0	2	–	7	–	0
$ – Conference champion; ^ – NAIA playoff participant

1956 South Dakota Intercollegiate Conference football standings
	Conf.					Overall
Team	W		L		T	W		L		T
Southern State (SD) $	7	–	0	–	0	9	–	0	–	0
Northern State	4	–	2	–	0	6	–	3	–	0
Black Hills	4	–	2	–	0	5	–	3	–	0
Dakota Wesleyan	5	–	3	–	0	5	–	3	–	0
General Beadle	2	–	2	–	1	4	–	3	–	1
Yankton	3	–	3	–	0	3	–	4	–	1
South Dakota Mines	1	–	5	–	1	1	–	6	–	1
Sioux Falls	1	–	5	–	0	1	–	6	–	0
Huron	1	–	6	–	0	2	–	7	–	0
$ – Conference champion; Northern State forfeited wins over Huron and Southern State. In 1957, Huron forfeited the conference title to Southern State and six conference wins, over Southern State, Black Hills, Dakota Wesleyan, General Beadle, South Dakota Mines, and Sioux Falls.

1956 Southwestern Athletic Conference football standings
	Conf.					Overall
Team	W		L		T	W		L		T
Texas Southern +	5	–	1	–	0	9	–	2	–	0
Wiley +	5	–	1	–	0	6	–	3	–	1
Southern	4	–	2	–	0	5	–	5	–	0
Prairie View A&M	4	–	2	–	0	5	–	5	–	0
Langston	2	–	4	–	0	3	–	7	–	0
Arkansas AM&N	0	–	5	–	1	2	–	6	–	1
Texas College	0	–	5	–	1	2	–	6	–	1
+ – Conference co-champions

1956 West Virginia Intercollegiate Athletic Conference football standings
	Conf.					Overall
Team	W		L		T	W		L		T
West Liberty State $	5	–	0	–	0	7	–	2	–	0
Fairmont State	7	–	1	–	0	7	–	1	–	0
Shepherd	4	–	1	–	0	6	–	2	–	0
Potomac State	6	–	2	–	0	6	–	2	–	0
Salem	4	–	3	–	0	4	–	4	–	0
Glenville State	2	–	6	–	0	2	–	6	–	0
West Virginia Tech	1	–	3	–	0	4	–	4	–	1
West Virginia Wesleyan	1	–	4	–	0	3	–	5	–	0
Davis & Elkins	0	–	6	–	0	1	–	7	–	0
Concord	0	–	7	–	0	0	–	9	–	0
Morris Harvey *	1	–	0	–	0	5	–	4	–	0
Bethany (WV) *	2	–	0	–	0	6	–	2	–	0
West Virginia State *	1	–	0	–	0	4	–	3	–	0
Bluefield State *	0	–	1	–	0	6	–	3	–	0
$ – Conference champion; * – Did not qualify for conference standings Conference standings based on power ratings

1956 Wisconsin State College Conference football standings
	Conf.					Overall
Team	W		L		T	W		L		T
Eau Claire State +	7	–	0	–	0	7	–	1	–	0
Platteville State +	5	–	0	–	0	5	–	1	–	0
River Falls State	4	–	1	–	0	6	–	2	–	0
Stevens Point State	3	–	3	–	0	4	–	4	–	0
Whitewater State	2	–	3	–	0	4	–	4	–	0
Superior State	2	–	3	–	0	4	–	5	–	0
La Crosse State	2	–	3	–	0	3	–	6	–	0
Oshkosh State	2	–	4	–	0	3	–	4	–	0
Stout State	0	–	5	–	0	1	–	7	–	0
Milwaukee	0	–	5	–	0	0	–	8	–	0
+ – Conference co-champions

== Bowl games ==
=== Major bowls ===
Tuesday, January 1, 1957

Bowl	Winner		Runner-up	
Orange	No. 20 Colorado Buffaloes	27	No. 19 Clemson Tigers	21
Cotton	No. 14 TCU Horned Frogs	28	No. 8 Syracuse Orangemen	27
Sugar	No. 11 Baylor Bears	13	No. 2 Tennessee Volunteers	7
Rose	No. 3 Iowa Hawkeyes	35	No. 10 Oregon State Beavers	19

=== 1956 Aluminum Bowl ===
Championship; December 22, 1956; 1956 Aluminum Bowl
Saint Joseph's (IN)	0
Montana State	0

=== Other bowls ===
Bowl	Location	Date	Winner	Score	Runner-up
Gator	Jacksonville, FL	December 29	No. 4 Georgia Tech Yellow Jackets	21–14	No. 13 Pittsburgh Panthers
Sun	El Paso, TX	January 1	No. 17 George Washington Colonials	13–0	Texas Western Miners

Minor bowls

Bowl	Winner		Runner-up	
Tangerine	West Texas State	20	Mississippi Southern	13
Burley	Memphis State	32	East Tennessee State	12
Refrigerator	Sam Houston State	27	Middle Tennessee State	13

- Orange Blossom Classic - The Tennessee A&I (9–0) and the Florida A&M Rattlers (8–0) were considered to be the No. 1 and No. 2 teams "among the nation's Negro grid powers". The teams from the two historically black universities played at the Orange Bowl stadium in Miami, which hosted the Orange Blossom Classic as well as the New Year's Day, historically white universities, Orange Bowl game. A crowd of 41,808 watched Tennessee A&I win 41–39. Tennessee A&I were declared black college football national champion.
- Prairie View Bowl - On January 1, 1957, the Prairie View A&M Panthers hosted the SWAC champion Texas Southern Tigers in the Prairie View Bowl in Houston, Texas.

== Final polls ==
Final polls were released in the first week of December.

AP poll
Rank	Team	1st	Points
1	Oklahoma	104	1,715
2	Tennessee	48	1,618
3	Iowa	15	1,270
4	Georgia Tech		1,211
5	Texas A&M		1,070
6	Miami (FL)	12	867
7	Michigan		599
8	Syracuse		406
9	Michigan State		309
10	Oregon State		229
11	Baylor		198
12	Minnesota		183
13	Pittsburgh		175
14	TCU		118
15	Ohio State		60
16	Navy		57
17	George Washington		51
18	USC		33
19	Clemson		28
20	Colorado		25

UP poll
Rank	Team	1st	Points
1	Oklahoma	26	337
2	Tennessee	5	301
3	Iowa	3	247
4	Georgia Tech	0	211
5	Texas A&M	0	202
6	Miami (FL)	1	134
7	Michigan	0	115
8	Syracuse	0	63
9	Minnesota	0	60
10	Michigan State	0	55
11	Baylor	0	46
12	Pittsburgh	0	36
13	Oregon State	0	21
14	TCU	0	18
15	USC	0	15
16	Wyoming	0	13
17	Yale	0	10
18	Colorado	0	9
19	Navy	0	8
20	Duke	0	6

== Heisman Trophy voting ==
The Heisman Trophy is given to the year's most outstanding player

Player	School	Position	1st	2nd	3rd	Total
Paul Hornung	Notre Dame	QB	197	162	151	1,066
Johnny Majors	Tennessee	HB	172	171	136	994
Tommy McDonald	Oklahoma	HB	205	122	114	973
Jerry Tubbs	Oklahoma	C	121	137	87	724
Jim Brown	Syracuse	HB	118	68	71	518
Ron Kramer	Michigan	E	70	104	100	518
John Brodie	Stanford	QB	39	52	60	281
Jim Parker	Ohio State	G	34	51	44	248
Ken Ploen	Iowa	QB	36	10	22	150
Jon Arnett	USC	HB	20	25	18	128

== Statistical leaders ==
=== Individual ===
==== Total offense ====
The following players were the individual leaders in total offense during the 1956 season:

Major college

Rank	Player	Team	Games	Plays	Total Yds	TdR
1	John Brodie	Stanford	10	295	1,642	14
2	Paul Hornung	Notre Dame	10	205	1,337	10
3	Bob Newman	Washington State	10	213	1,177	9
4	Tom Flores	Pacific	10	171	1,167	18
5	Guy Martin	Colgate	9	208	1,165	10
6	Jim Crawford	Wyoming	10	202	1,114	15
7	Johnny Majors	Tennessee	10	167	1,101	12
8	Billy Stacy	Mississippi State	10	209	1,077	9
9	Bob Reinhart	San Jose State	10	212	1,068	12
10	Jim Brown	Syracuse	8	162	1,062	15

Small college

Rank	Player	Team	Games	Plays	Total Yds
1	Dick Jamieson	Bradley	10	240	1925
2	John "Yommie" Costello	Pennsylvania Military	9	167	1739
3	Jim Stehlin	Brandeis	9	316	1566
4	Edward "Bo" Murray	Grambling	9	164	1418
5	Bill Engelhardt	Omaha	9	273	1398
6	Williams	Western Reserve	7	258	1218
7	Bob Webb	St. Ambrose	9	179	1211
8	Bill Rhodes	Colorado Western	10	134	1200
9	Joe Ortiz	College of Emporia	9	140	1182
10	Ron Parrish	Linfield	9	199	1146

==== Passing ====
The following players were the individual leaders in pass completions during the 1956 season:

Major college

Rank	Player	Team	Games	Compl.	Att.	Pct. Compl.	Yds.	Int.	TDs
1	John Brodie	Stanford	10	139	240	.579	1633	14	12
2	Bob Newman	Washington State	10	91	170	.535	1240	8	8
3	Bob Reinhart	San Jose State	10	90	172	.523	1138	5	10
4	Guy Martin	Colgate	9	88	170	.518	1100	15	9
5	Gene Saur	Hardin-Simmons	10	78	133	.586	968	10	8
6	Ralph Hunsaker	Arizona	10	75	148	.507	823	12	4
7	Joe Clements	Texas	10	74	151	.490	793	16	7
8	Tom Flores	Pacific	10	73	127	.575	1119	8	11
9	Charlie Arnold	SMU	10	71	157	.452	964	14	8
10	Carroll Johnston	BYU	10	71	167	.425	945	15	8

Small college

Rank	Player	Team	Games	Compl.	Att.	Pct. Compl.	Yds.	Int.	TDs
1	Jim Stehlin	Brandeis	9	116	206	.563	1155	11	6
2	Dick Jamieson	Bradley	10	95	192	.495	1796	12	21
3	Jack Kemp	Occidental	9	92	184	.500	1123	8	7
4	Garda	Lebanon Valley	8	83	163	.509	874	12	7
5	Williams	Western Reserve	7	78	150	.520	872	10	8
6	Bob Webb	St. Ambrose	9	77	147	.524	1278	7	14
7	Robert Anastas	Amer Intern	9	74	147	.504	833	19	9
7	John "Yommie" Costello	Pennsylvania Military	9	74	149	.497	1702	10	17
9	Frank Sudock	Albright	9	72	170	.424	993	14	3
10	Ron Parrish	Linfeld	9	63	143	.441	889	13	7

==== Rushing ====
The following players were the individual leaders in rushing yards during the 1956 season:
Major college

Rank	Player	Team	Games	Yds	Rushes	Avg
1	Jim Crawford	Wyoming	10	1,104	200	5.52
2	Billy Ray Barnes	Wake Forest	10	1,010	168	6.01
3	Jim Brown	Syracuse	8	986	158	6.24
4	Hill	Utah State	10	920	140	6.57
5	Jim Bakhtiar	Virginia	10	879	203	4.33
6	Mel Dillard	Purdue	9	873	193	4.52
7	Tommy McDonald	Oklahoma	10	853	119	7.17
8	Clendon Thomas	Oklahoma	10	817	104	7.86
9	Don Clark	Ohio State	9	797	139	5.73
10	C. R. Roberts	USC	10	775	120	6.46
11	Ed Sutton	North Carolina	10	748	120	6.23
12	Don Bosseler	Miami (FL)	10	723	161	4.49
13	Bobby Mulgado	Arizona State	10	721	107	6.74
14	Jim Roseboro	Ohio State	9	712	152	4.68
15	Bob Kyasky	Army	9	707	129	5.48
16	Tommy Lorino	Auburn	10	692	82	8.44
17	Jerry Brown	Nebraska	10	690	129	5.35
18	Joel Wells	Clemson	10	678	156	4.35
19	Jim Swink	TCU	10	665	158	4.21
20	Pete Hart	Hardin-Simmons	10	664	131	5.07

Small college

Rank	Player	Team	Games	Yds	Rushes	Avg
1	Bill Rhodes	Colorado Western	10	1200	130	9.23
2	Walter Livingston	Heidelberg	9	1086	175	6.21
3	James C. "Pancho" Villa	Allegheny	8	1073	134	8.01
4	Edward "Bo" Murray	Grambling	9	1028	110	9.35
5	Tom Dingle	Wooster	9	1027	175	5.87
6	Jarock	St. Norbert	9	1000	125	8.00
7	Addleman	College of Emporia	9	964	148	6.51
8	Kimmel	Youngstown	8	940	168	5.60
9	Smith	Denison	9	913	158	5.78
10	Taylor	Geneva	9	869	137	6.34

==== Receiving ====
The following players were the individual leaders in receptions during the 1956 season:

Major college

Rank	Player	Team	Receptions	Receiving Yards	Touchdowns
1	Art Powell	San Jose State	40	583	5
2	Bill Steiger	Washington State	39	607	5
3	Baird	Hardin-Simmons	37	455	1
4	Brad Bomba	Indiana	31	407	1
5	Aldrich	Idaho	30	409	1
5	James	Missouri	30	362	3
7	Jamison	Colgate	29	289	6
8	Camera	Stanford	28	350	2
9	Farrell Funston	Pacific	27	563	5
9	Ellingsen	Washington State	27	455	1
9	Wilson	Denver	27	383	4

Small college

Rank	Player	Team	Receptions	Receiving Yards	Touchdowns
1	Tom Rychlec	Amer Inter	40	353	3
2	Hill	Pennsylvania Military	39	852	10
3	Don Carothers	Bradley	33	697	10
4	Jim E. Mora	Occidental	32	328	1
5	Anderson	Los Angeles State	30	603	7
6	Bob Schembs	Whitman	29	392	3
6	Stein	Brandeis	29	207	0
8	Westmeyer	St. Ambrose	28	538	5
8	Payne	William Jewell	28	343	3
10	Tom Zesiger	Ohio Wesleyan	27	513	5
10	Cimino	Omaha	27	485	5

==== Scoring ====
The following players were the individual leaders in scoring during the 1956 season:

Major college

Rank	Player	Team	Pts	TD	PAT	FG
1	Clendon Thomas	Oklahoma	108	18	0	0
2	Jim Brown	Syracuse	106	14	22	0
3	Jack Hill	Utah State	105	15	15	0
4	Tommy McDonald	Oklahoma	102	17	0	0
5	Jim Crawford	Wyoming	96	14	12	0
6	Bob Kyasky	Army	85	14	1	0
7	John Bayuk	Colorado	66	11	0	0
7	Jack Call	Colgate	66	11	0	0
9	Dean Derby	Washington	63	7	18	1
10	Hewes Agnew	Princeton	61	10	1	0
11	Mike Brown	Dartmouth	60	10	0	0
11	John David Crow	Texas A&M	60	10	0	0
11	Lou Valli	Stanford	60	10	0	0
11	Del Shofner	Baylor	60	10	0	0
15	Jim Taylor	LSU	59	8	8	1
16	Bobby Mulgado	Arizona State	56	8	8	0
16	Buford Waterhouse	Drake	56	9	2	0
16	Paul Hornung	Notre Dame	56	7	14	0
19	Bobby Jordan	VMI	55	8	7	0
20	Dennis McGill	Yale	54	9	0	0
20	Charlie McCue	Kansas	54	9	0	0

Small college

Rank	Player	Team	Pts	TD	PAT	FG
1	Larry Houdek	Kansas Wesleyan	114	19	0	0
2	John Steffen	River Falls State	111	14	27	0
3	Al Frazier	Florida A&M	109	15	19	0
4	Tom Schwalbach	Northern Michigan	103	14	19	0
5	George Kelleher	Trinity (CT)	99	14	15	0
5	Bob "Spinner" Martin	Bates	99	15	9	0
7	Larson	Carthage	97	15	7	0
8	Villa	Allegheny	96	16	0	0
8	Bullard	Lenoir-Rhyne	96	16	0	0
8	Garber	Capital	96 points	16	0	0

=== Team ===
==== Total offense ====
The following teams were the leaders in total offense during the 1956 season:

Major college

Rank	Team	Games played	Total plays	Yards gained	Yards per game
1	Oklahoma	10	775	4817	481.7
2	Hardin-Simmons	10	786	3912	391.2
3	Auburn	10	670	3749	374.9
4	Pacific	10	684	3645	364.5
5	Arizona State	10	625	3609	360.9
6	Michigan State	9	585	3231	359.0
7	TCU	10	718	3563	356.3
8	Virginia Tech	10	726	3559	355.9
9	Yale	9	574	3199	355.4
10	Denver	10	676	3505	350.5

Small college

Rank	Team	Games played	Total plays	Yards gained	Yards per game
1	Florida A&M	8	418	3800	475.0
2	Tufts	7	450	3083	440.4
3	Tennessee A&I	9	564	3803	422.6
4	Bradley	10	642	4110	411.0
5	College of Emporia	9	576	3687	409.7
6	Grambling	9	505	3618	402.0
7	Alfred	7	407	2800	400.0
8	Texas Southern	10	645	3959	395.9
9	Montana State	9	624	3488	387.6
10	Bowling Green	9	615	3434	381.6

==== Rushing offense ====
The following teams were the leaders in rushing offense during the 1956 season:

Major college

Rank	Team	Yards per game
1	Oklahoma	391.0
2	VPI	283.5
3	Auburn	276.0
3	Army	276.0
5	Ohio State	274.2
6	USC	269.5
7	Washington	268.8
8	Yale	264.7
9	Texas A&M	263.8
10	Michigan State	256.9

Small college

Rank	Team	Yards per game
1	Tufts	359.9
2	Florida A&M	347.9
3	Montana State	339.1
4	College of Emporia	322.4
5	West Texas State	319.9
6	Bowling Green	318.3
7	Denison	315.4
8	Texas Southern	298.6
9	Colorado Western	289.1
10	Lewis and Clark	283.8

==== Passing offense ====
The following teams were the leaders in passing offense during the 1956 season:

Major college

Rank	Team	Yards per game
1	Washington State	206.8
2	Stanford	204.4
3	Pacific	188.9
4	San Jose State	188.1
5	Hardin-Simmons	156.9
6	Rice	137.3
7	Navy	133.0
8	Texas	130.3
9	Colgate	129.0
10	BYU	128.6

Small college

Rank	Team	Yards per game
1	Pennsylvania Military	207.7
2	Bradley	196.4
3	St. Ambrose	183.0
4	Brandeis	169.2
5	Loras	153.3
6	Buffalo	142.1
7	Tennessee A&I	141.7
8	Hamilton	138.7
9	Occidental	137.6
10	New Haven State	136.9

==== Total defense ====
The following teams were the leaders in total defense during the 1956 season:

Major college

Rank	Team	Games played	Total plays	Yards gained	Yards per game
1	Miami (FL)	10	590	1894	189.4
2	Oklahoma	10	634	1938	193.8
3	Ole Miss	10	572	1955	195.5
4	South Carolina	10	558	1998	199.8
5	Georgia Tech	10	537	2003	200.3
6	Navy	9	543	1840	204.4
7	Auburn	10	540	2083	208.3
8	Texas A&M	10	601	2088	208.8
9	Penn State	9	534	1903	211.4
10	Pittsburgh	10	591	2154	215.4

Small college

Rank	Team	Games played	Total plays	Yards gained	Yards per game
1	Tennessee A&I	9	463	1070	118.9
2	Hillsdale	9	467	1128	125.3
3	Westminster	8	441	1105	138.1
4	Capital	8	424	1203	150.4
5	Moravian	8	394	1208	151.0
6	Allen	9	378	1367	151.9
7	Florida A&M	8	405	1259	157.4
8	Juniata	7	378	1120	160.0
9	Montana State	9	492	1506	167.3
10	South Carolina State	9	465	1531	170.1

==== Rushing defense ====
The following teams were the leaders in rushing defense during the 1956 season:

Major college

Rank	Team	Yards per game
1	Miami (FL)	106.9
2	Navy	113.1
3	Holy Cross	123.3
4	Georgia Tech	128.4
5	Boston College	130.1
6	Texas A&M	130.2
7	West Virginia	136.9
8	Oklahoma	138.3
9	Iowa	142.8
10	Ole Miss	144.9

Small college

Rank	Team	Yards per game
1	Hillsdale	51.1
2	Tennessee A&I	52.9
3	New Haven State	56.6
4	Gettysburg	73.7
5	Mississippi Southern	75.1
6	Florida A&M	79.3
7	Juniata	80.6
8	Capital	82.0
9	Allen	87.1
10	Moravian	88.4

==== Passing defense ====
The following teams were the leaders in passing defense during the 1956 season:

Major college

Rank	Team	Yards per game
1	Villanova	43.8
2	Dartmouth	45.3
3	South Carolina	47.6
4	Penn State	48.2
5	TCU	49.7
5	Wake Forest	49.7
7	Ole Miss	50.6
8	Clemson	52.6
9	Auburn	52.8
10	NC State	53.0

Small college

Rank	Team	Yards per game
1	West Virginia Tech	29.1
2	Mankato State	30.3
3	Virginia Union	36.3
4	Concordia	41.8
5	Davidson	42.7
6	North Dakota	43.0
7	Colorado State	43.6
8	Akron	45.6
9	Idaho State	47.1
10	Westminster	47.6

== See also ==
- 1956 College Football All-America Team
- 1956 Little All-America college football team
