= 1956 Ivy League football season =

- League: NCAA University Division
- Sport: Football
- Duration: September 29, 1956 – November 24, 1956
- Teams: 8

1957 NFL Draft
- Top draft pick: Al Ward (Yale)
- Picked by: Chicago Bears, 91st overall

Regular season
- Champions: Yale

Football seasons
- 1957 →

1956 Ivy League football standings
	Conf.					Overall
Team	W		L		T	W		L		T
Yale $	7	–	0	–	0	8	–	1	–	0
Princeton	5	–	2	–	0	7	–	2	–	0
Dartmouth	4	–	3	–	0	5	–	4	–	0
Penn	4	–	3	–	0	4	–	5	–	0
Brown	3	–	4	–	0	5	–	4	–	0
Columbia	2	–	5	–	0	3	–	6	–	0
Harvard	2	–	5	–	0	2	–	6	–	0
Cornell	1	–	6	–	0	1	–	8	–	0
$ – Conference champion

The 1956 Ivy League football season was the first season of college football play for the Ivy League and was part of the 1956 college football season. The season began on September 29, 1956, and ended on November 24, 1956. Ivy League teams were 4–7–1 against non-conference opponents and Yale won the conference championship.

== Season overview ==
Conf. Rank	Team	Head coach	AP final	AP high	Overall record	Conf. record	PPG	PAG
1	Yale	Jordan Olivar	NR	NR	8–1	7–0	27.3	10.8
2	Princeton	Charlie Caldwell	NR	#20	7–2	5–2	26.3	15.0
3 (tie)	Dartmouth	Bob Blackman	NR	NR	5–4	4–3	13.6	9.9
3 (tie)	Penn	Steve Sebo	NR	NR	4–5	4–3	10.7	24.0
5	Brown	Alva Kelley	NR	NR	5–4	3–4	13.8	10.4
6 (tie)	Columbia	Lou Little	NR	NR	3–6	2–5	10.4	26.3
6 (tie)	Harvard	Lloyd Jordan	NR	NR	2–6	2–5	19.1	24.9
8	Cornell	George K. James	NR	NR	1–8	1–6	11.1	23.2

== Schedule ==
Index to colors and formatting
Ivy League member won
Ivy League member lost
Ivy League teams in **bold**

=== Week 1 ===
Date	Visiting team	Home team	Site	Result
September 29	Connecticut	**Yale**	Yale Bowl • New Haven, CT	**W** 19–14
September 29	Rutgers	**Princeton**	Palmer Stadium • Princeton, NJ	**W** 28–6
September 29	New Hampshire	**Dartmouth**	Memorial Field • Hanover, NH	**W** 13–0
September 29	Penn State	**Penn**	Franklin Field • Philadelphia, PA	**L** 34–0
September 29	**Brown**	**Columbia**	Baker Field • New York City, NY	**BROWN** 20–0
September 29	**Cornell**	Colgate	Colgate University • Hamilton, NY	**L** 6–34

Date	Bye Week
September 29	Harvard

=== Week 2 ===
Date	Visiting team	Home team	Site	Result
October 6	**Brown**	**Yale**	Yale Bowl • New Haven, CT	**YALE** 30–2
October 6	**Columbia**	**Princeton**	Palmer Stadium • Princeton, NJ	**PRIN** 39–0
October 6	**Dartmouth**	**Penn**	Franklin Field • Philadelphia, PA	**PENN** 14–7
October 6	Tufts	**Harvard**	Harvard Stadium • Boston, MA	**L** 13–19
October 6	Navy	**Cornell**	Schoellkopf Field • Ithaca, NY	**L** 14–0

=== Week 3 ===
Date	Visiting team	Home team	Site	Result
October 13	**Yale**	**Columbia**	Baker Field • New York City, NY	**YALE** 33–19
October 13	**Princeton**	**Penn**	Franklin Field • Philadelphia, PA	**PRIN** 34–0
October 13	**Dartmouth**	**Brown**	Brown Stadium • Providence, RI	**DART** 14–7
October 13	**Harvard**	**Cornell**	Schoellkopf Field • Ithaca, NY	**HAR** 32–7

=== Week 4 ===
Date	Visiting team	Home team	Site	Result
October 20	**Cornell**	**Yale**	Yale Bowl • New Haven, CT	**YALE** 25–7
October 20	Colgate	**Princeton**	Palmer Stadium • Princeton, NJ	**W** 28–20
October 20	Holy Cross	**Dartmouth**	Memorial Field • Hanover, NH	**T** 7–7
October 20	**Brown**	**Penn**	Franklin Field • Philadelphia, PA	**PENN** 14–7
October 20	**Harvard**	**Columbia**	Baker Field • New York City, NY	**COL** 26–20

=== Week 5 ===
Date	Visiting team	Home team	Site	Result
October 27	Colgate	Yale	Yale Bowl • New Haven, CT	**L** 6–14
October 27	**Princeton**	Cornell	Schoellkopf Field • Ithaca, NY	**PRIN** 31–21
October 27	**Dartmouth**	Harvard	Harvard Stadium • Boston, MA	**HAR** 28–21
October 27	Navy	Penn	Franklin Field • Philadelphia, PA	**L** 54–6
October 27	Rhode Island	Brown	Brown Stadium • Providence, RI	**BROWN** 27–7
October 27	Army	Columbia	Baker Field • New York City, NY	**L** 0–60

=== Week 6 ===
Date	Visiting team	Home team	Site	Result
November 3	**Dartmouth**	**Yale**	Yale Bowl • New Haven, CT	**YALE** 19–0
November 3	**Brown**	**Princeton**	Palmer Stadium • Princeton, NJ	**PRIN** 21–7
November 3	**Penn**	**Harvard**	Harvard Stadium • Boston, MA	**PENN** 28–14
November 3	**Cornell**	**Columbia**	Baker Field • New York City, NY	**COL** 25–19

=== Week 7 ===
Date	Visiting team	Home team	Site	Result
November 10	**Penn**	**Yale**	Yale Bowl • New Haven, CT	**YALE** 40–7
November 10	**Harvard**	**Princeton**	Palmer Stadium • Princeton, NJ	**PRIN** 35–20
November 10	**Columbia**	**Dartmouth**	Memorial Field • Hanover, NH	**DART** 14–0
November 10	**Cornell**	**Brown**	Brown Stadium • Providence, RI	**BROWN** 13–6

=== Week 8 ===
Date	Visiting team	Home team	Site	Result
November 17	#20 **Princeton**	**Yale**	Yale Bowl • New Haven, CT	**YALE** 42–20
November 17	**Dartmouth**	**Cornell**	Schoellkopf Field • Ithaca, NY	**DART** 27–14
November 17	**Penn**	**Columbia**	Baker Field • New York City, NY	**PENN** 20–6
November 17	**Brown**	**Harvard**	Harvard Stadium • Boston, MA	**BROWN** 21–12

=== Week 9 ===
Date	Visiting team	Home team	Site	Result
November 22	**Penn**	**Cornell**	Franklin Field • Philadelphia, PA	**COR** 20–7
November 22	Colgate	**Brown**	Brown Stadium • Providence, RI	**W** 20–0
November 24	**Yale**	**Harvard**	Harvard Stadium • Boston, MA	**YALE** 42–14
November 24	**Dartmouth**	**Princeton**	Palmer Stadium • Princeton, NJ	**DART** 19–0
November 24	**Columbia**	**Rutgers**	Rutgers Stadium • Piscataway, NJ	**W** 18–12

== 1957 NFL draft ==
Four Ivy League players were drafted in the 1957 NFL draft, held in November 1956 and January 1957: Al Ward, Paul Lopata, Dennis McGill, and Mike Bowman.

Rnd.	Pick No.	NFL team	Player	Pos.	College	Conf.	Notes
8	91	Chicago Bears	Al Ward	B	Yale	Ivy	from Pittsburgh
8	93	Washington Redskins	Paul Lopata	E	Yale	Ivy	
24	278	Philadelphia Eagles	Dennis McGill	B	Yale	Ivy	
29	349	New York Giants	Mike Bowman	G	Princeton	Ivy	
