= List of Brown Bears football seasons =

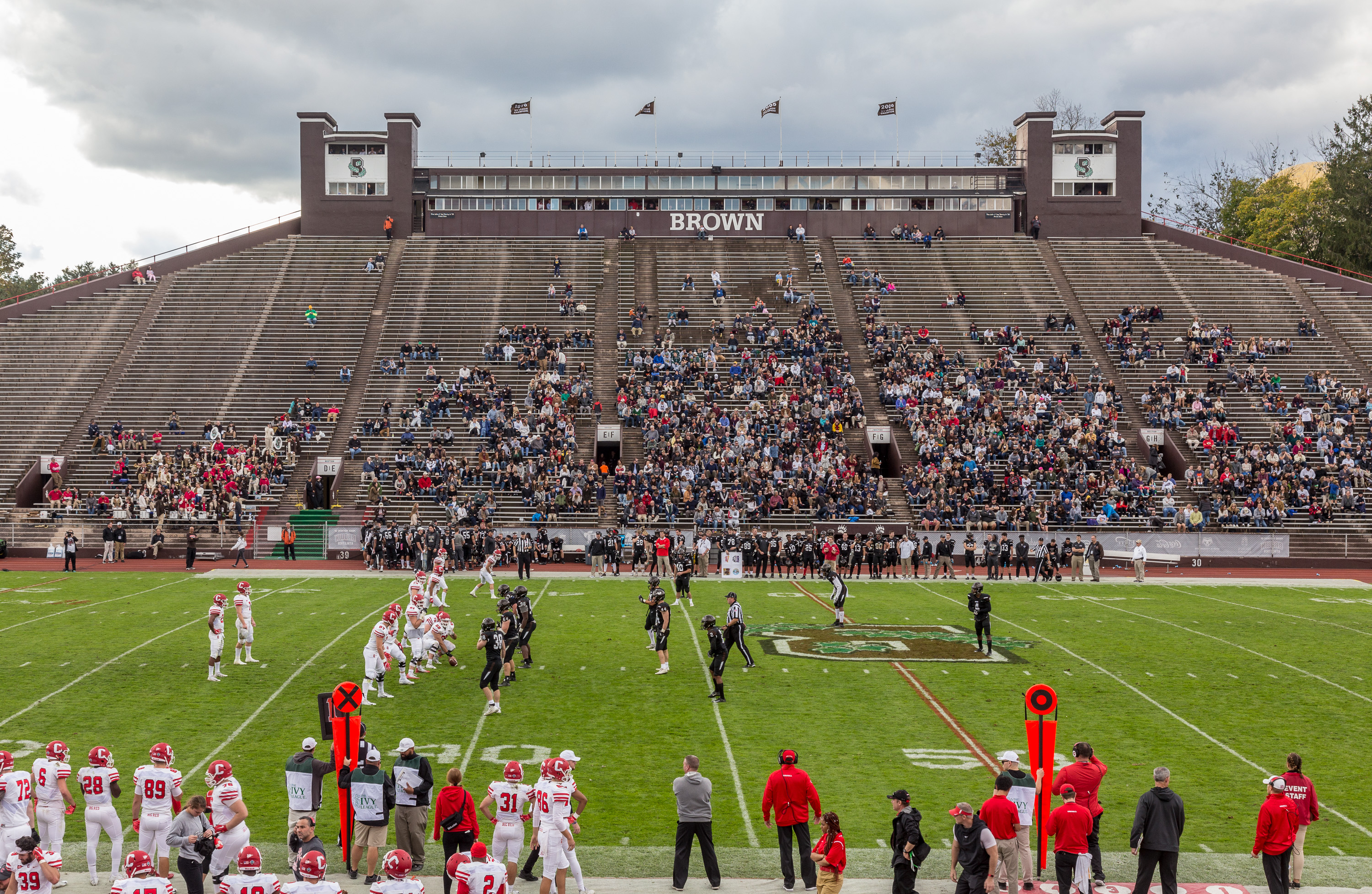
The Brown Bears have played their home games at Brown Stadium since 1925

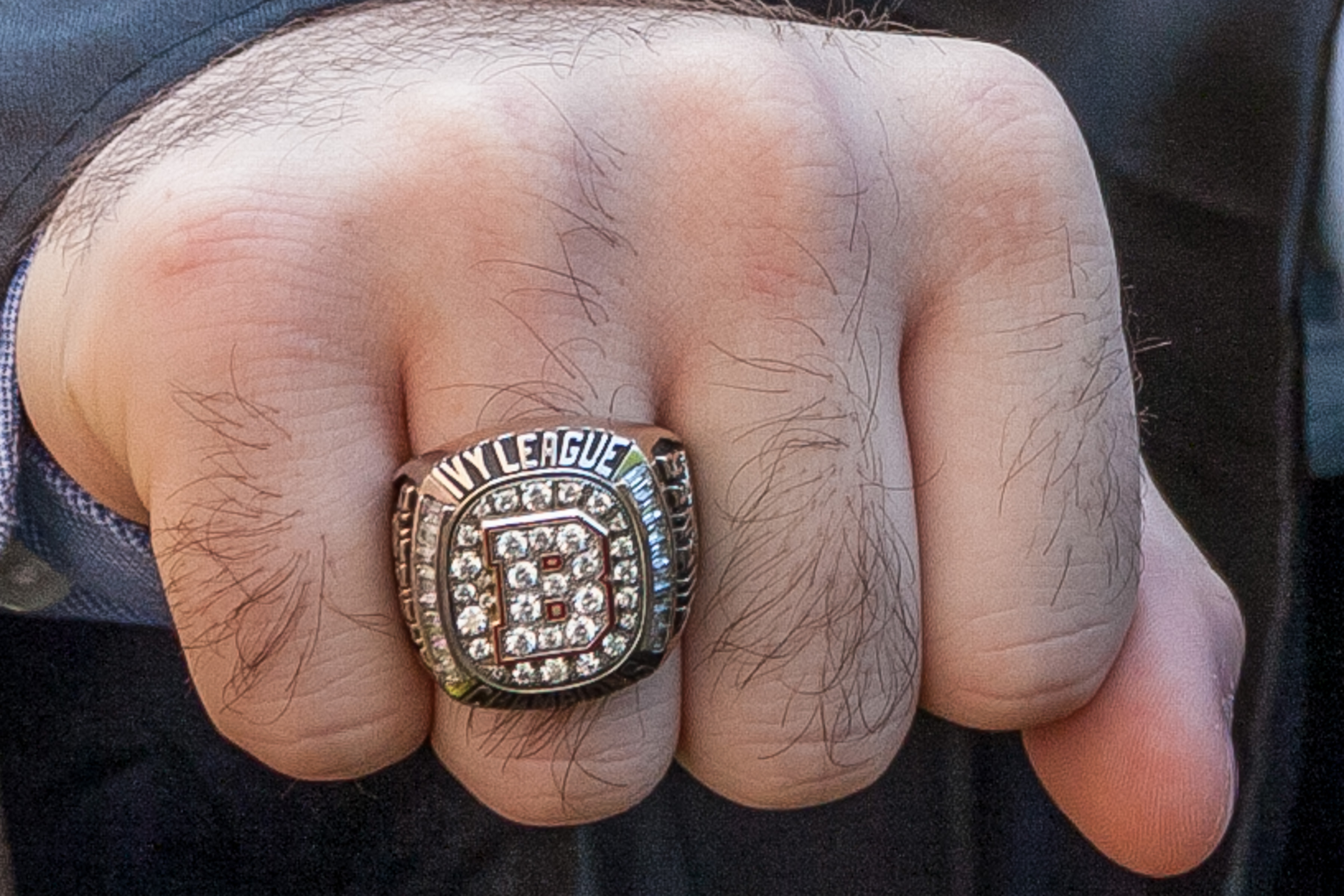
The Bears won the Ivy Championship in 2005

This is a list of seasons completed by the Brown Bears football team of the National Collegiate Athletic Association (NCAA) Division I Football Championship Subdivision (FCS). Since the team's first game in 1878, the Bears have contested more than 1,200 officially sanctioned games, holding an all-time record of 637–622–40. Brown competed as a football independent since its founding before joining the Ivy League in 1956.

== Seasons ==
Year	Coach	Overall	Conference	Standing	Bowl/playoffs	Coaches^{#}	AP^{°}
Independent (1878–1891)
1878	No coach	0–1					
1879	No team						
1880	No coach	0–1					
1881–85	No team						
1886	No coach	1–1					
1887	No team						
1888	No team						
1889	No coach	2–2					
1890	No coach	2–4–1					
1891	No coach	4–6					
Charles P. Howland (Independent) (1892)
1892	Charles P. Howland	4–5–1					
William Odlin (Independent) (1893)
1893	William Odlin	6–3					
William G. Norton (Independent) (1894)
1894	William G. Norton	10–5					
Wallace Moyle (Independent) (1895–1897)
1895	Wallace Moyle	7–6–1					
1896	Wallace Moyle	4–5–1					
1897	Wallace Moyle	7–4					
Eddie N. Robinson (Independent) (1898–1901)
1898	Eddie N. Robinson	6–4					
1899	Eddie N. Robinson	7–3–1					
1900	Eddie N. Robinson	7–3–1					
1901	Eddie N. Robinson	4–7–1					
J.A. Gammons (Independent) (1902)
1902	J.A. Gammons	5–4–1					
Dave Fultz (Independent) (1903)
1903	Dave Fultz	5–4–1					
Eddie N. Robinson (Independent) (1904–1907)
1904	Eddie N. Robinson	6–5					
1905	Eddie N. Robinson	7–4					
1906	Eddie N. Robinson	6–3					
1907	Eddie N. Robinson	7–3					
J.A. Gammons (Independent) (1908–1909)
1908	J.A. Gammons	5–3–1					
1909	J.A. Gammons	7–3					
Eddie N. Robinson (Independent) (1910–1925)
1910	Eddie N. Robinson	7–2–1					
1911	Eddie N. Robinson	7–3–1					
1912	Eddie N. Robinson	6–4					
1913	Eddie N. Robinson	4–5					
1914	Eddie N. Robinson	5–2–2					
1915	Eddie N. Robinson	5–4–1			L Rose		
1916	Eddie N. Robinson	8–1					
1917	Eddie N. Robinson	8–2					
1918	Eddie N. Robinson	2–3					
1919	Eddie N. Robinson	5–4–1					
1920	Eddie N. Robinson	6–3					
1921	Eddie N. Robinson	5–3–1					
1922	Eddie N. Robinson	6–2–1					
1923	Eddie N. Robinson	6–4					
1924	Eddie N. Robinson	5–4					
1925	Eddie N. Robinson	5–4–1					
Tuss McLaughry (Independent) (1926–1940)
1926	Tuss McLaughry	9–0–1					
1927	Tuss McLaughry	3–6–1					
1928	Tuss McLaughry	8–1					
1929	Tuss McLaughry	5–5					
1930	Tuss McLaughry	6–3–1					
1931	Tuss McLaughry	7–3					
1932	Tuss McLaughry	7–1					
1933	Tuss McLaughry	7–1					
1934	Tuss McLaughry	3–6					
1935	Tuss McLaughry	1–8					
1936	Tuss McLaughry	3–7					
1937	Tuss McLaughry	5–4					
1938	Tuss McLaughry	5–3					
1939	Tuss McLaughry	5–3–1					
1940	Tuss McLaughry	6–3–1					
Skip Stahley (Independent) (1941–1943)
1941	Skip Stahley	5–4					
1942	Skip Stahley	4–4					
1943	Skip Stahley	5–3					
Rip Engle (Independent) (1944–1949)
1944	Rip Engle	3–4–1					
1945	Rip Engle	3–4–1					
1946	Rip Engle	3–5–1					
1947	Rip Engle	4–4–1					
1948	Rip Engle	7–2					
1949	Rip Engle	8–1					
G.G. Zitrides (Independent) (1950)
1950	G.G. Zitrides	1–8					
Alva Kelley (Independent) (1951–1955)
1951	Alva Kelley	2–7					
1952	Alva Kelley	2–7					
1953	Alva Kelley	3–5–1					
1954	Alva Kelley	6–2–1					
1955	Alva Kelley	2–7					
Alva Kelley (Ivy League) (1956–1958)
1956	Alva Kelley	5–4	3–4	5th			
1957	Alva Kelley	5–4	3–4	T–4th			
1958	Alva Kelley	6–3	4–3	T–4th			
John McLaughry (Ivy League) (1959–1966)
1959	John McLaughry	2–6–1	1–5–1	7th			
1960	John McLaughry	3–6	1–6	T–7th			
1961	John McLaughry	0–9	0–7	8th			
1962	John McLaughry	1–6–2	0–6–1	8th			
1963	John McLaughry	3–5	2–5	7th			
1964	John McLaughry	5–4	3–4	T–5th			
1965	John McLaughry	2–7	1–6	T–7th			
1966	John McLaughry	1–8	0–7	8th			
Len Jardine (Ivy League) (1967–1972)
1967	Len Jardine	2–6–1	1–5–1	7th			
1968	Len Jardine	2–7	0–7	8th			
1969	Len Jardine	2–7	1–6	T–7th			
1970	Len Jardine	2–7	1–6	T–7th			
1971	Len Jardine	0–9	0–7	8th			
1972	Len Jardine	1–8	1–6	8th			
John Anderson (Ivy League) (1973–1983)
1973	John Anderson	4–3–1	4–3	5th			
1974	John W. Anderson	5–4	4–3	4th			
1975	John W. Anderson	6–2–1	5–1–1	2nd			
1976	John W. Anderson	8–1	6–1	T–1st			
1977	John W. Anderson	7–2	5–2	2nd			
1978	John W. Anderson	6–3	5–2	2nd			
1979	John W. Anderson	6–3	5–2	2nd			
1980	John W. Anderson	6–4	4–3	T–3rd			
1981	John W. Anderson	3–7	2–5	T–5th			
1982	John W. Anderson	5–5	3–4	T–4th			
1983	John W. Anderson	4–5–1	4–2–1	T–3rd			
John Rosenberg (Ivy League) (1984–1989)
1984	John Rosenberg	4–5	4–3	4th			
1985	John Rosenberg	5–4–1	4–3	4th			
1986	John Rosenberg	5–4–1	4–2–1	3rd			
1987	John Rosenberg	7–3	5–2	T–2nd			
1988	John Rosenberg	0–9–1	0–6–1	8th			
1989	John Rosenberg	2–8	2–5	T–5th			
Mickey Kwiatkowski (Ivy League) (1990–1993)
1990	Mickey Kwiatkowski	2–8	2–5	T–6th			
1991	Mickey Kwiatkowski	1–9	1–6	T–7th			
1992	Mickey Kwiatkowski	0–10	0–7	8th			
1993	Mickey Kwiatkowski	4–6	3–4	T–4th			
Mark Whipple (Ivy League) (1994–1997)
1994	Mark Whipple	7–3	4–3	T–2nd			
1995	Mark Whipple	5–5	2–5	T–6th			
1996	Mark Whipple	5–5	4–3	T–3rd			
1997	Mark Whipple	6–4 (Note: Penn forfeited a conference win over Brown due to the use of ineligible players, leading to an official record of 7–3 (4–3).)	3–4	T–4th			
Phil Estes (Ivy League) (1998–2018)
1998	Phil Estes	7–3	5–2	T–2nd			
1999	Phil Estes	9–1	6–1	T–1st			25
2000	Phil Estes	7–3	4–3	T–3rd			
2001	Phil Estes	6–3	5–2	3rd			
2002	Phil Estes	2–8	2–5	T–6th			
2003	Phil Estes	5–5	4–3	T–2nd			
2004	Phil Estes	6–4	3–4	T–4th			
2005	Phil Estes	9–1	6–1	1st			15
2006	Phil Estes	3–7	2–5	T–6th			
2007	Phil Estes	5–5	4–3	3rd			
2008	Phil Estes	7–3	6–1	T–1st			
2009	Phil Estes	6–4	4–3	3rd			
2010	Phil Estes	6–4	5–2	T–2nd			
2011	Phil Estes	7–3	4–3	T–2nd			
2012	Phil Estes	7–3	4–3	T–3rd			
2013	Phil Estes	6–4	3–4	T–4th			
2014	Phil Estes	5–5	3–4	5th			
2015	Phil Estes	5–5	3–4	T–4th			
2016	Phil Estes	4–6	3–4	4th			
2017	Phil Estes	2–8	0–7	8th			
2018	Phil Estes	1–9	0–7	8th			
James Perry (Ivy League) (2019–present)
2019	James Perry	2–8	1–6	8th			
2020	No team (Note: Brown did not compete during the 2020 season as a result of the COVID-19 pandemic and the subsequent cancellation of the Ivy League season.)						
2021	James Perry	2–8	1–6	T–6th			
2022	James Perry	3–7	1–6	8th			
2023	James Perry	5–5	3–4	T–5th			
2024	James Perry	3–7	2–5	T–6th			
2025	James Perry	5–5	2–5	T–6th			
Total:		637–622–40					
National championship Conference title Conference division title or championship game berth
^{†}Indicates Bowl Coalition, Bowl Alliance, BCS, or CFP / New Years' Six bowl.; ^{#}Rankings from final Coaches Poll.

== See also ==
- List of Ivy League football standings
