= 1956 Holy Cross Crusaders football team =

American college football season

1956 Holy Cross Crusaders football
- Conference: Independent
- Record: 5–3–1
- Head coach: Eddie Anderson (13th season)
- Captain: Richard J. Arcand
- Home stadium: Fitton Field

1956 Eastern major college football independents records
	Conf.			Overall
Team	W	L	T	W		L		T
No. 8 Syracuse		–		7	–	2	–	0
Penn State		–		6	–	2	–	1
No. 13 Pittsburgh		–		7	–	3	–	1
Army		–		5	–	3	–	1
Holy Cross		–		5	–	3	–	1
Villanova		–		5	–	4	–	0
Boston College		–		5	–	4	–	0
Colgate		–		4	–	5	–	0
Boston University		–		1	–	5	–	2
Rankings from AP poll

The 1956 Holy Cross Crusaders football team was an American football team that represented the College of the Holy Cross as an independent during the 1956 college football season. In its 13th year under head coach Eddie Anderson, the team compiled a 5–3–1 record. The team played its home games at Fitton Field on the college's campus in Worcester, Massachusetts.

== Schedule ==
Date	Opponent	Site	Result	Attendance	Source
September 30	Dayton	Fitton Field; Worcester, MA	L 13–14	20,000	
October 6	Colgate ^{†}	Fitton Field; Worcester, MA	W 20–6	12,000	
October 13	at Penn State	New Beaver Field; State College, PA	L 0–43	24,870	
October 20	at Dartmouth	Memorial Field; Hanover, NH	T 7–7	12,000	
October 28	Quantico Marines^	Fitton Field; Worcester, MA	W 13–0	17,000	
November 3	at Boston University	Boston University Field; Boston, MA	W 21–12	12,089	
November 10	at No. 9 Syracuse	Archbold Stadium; Syracuse, NY	L 20–41	17,000	
November 18	Marquette	Fitton Field; Worcester, MA	W 41–0	6,000–7,000	
December 1	at Boston College	Fenway Park; Boston, MA (rivalry)	W 7–0	34,176	
^{†}Homecoming; ^ Family weekend; Rankings from AP Poll released prior to the game; Source:

== Statistical leaders ==
Statistical leaders for the 1956 Crusaders included:

- Rushing: Dick Surrette, 168 yards and 2 touchdowns on 53 attempts
- Passing: Bill Smithers, 699 yards, 44 completions and 8 touchdowns on 87 attempts
- Receiving: Dick Arcand, 200 yards and 4 touchdowns on 13 receptions
- Scoring: Dick Arcand, 24 points on 4 touchdowns
- Total offense: Bill Smithers, 796 yards (699 passing, 97 rushing)
- All-purpose yards: Dick Surrette, 252 yards (168 rushing, 84 receiving)
