= 1956 Boston University Terriers football team =

American college football season

1956 Boston University Terriers football
- Conference: Independent
- Record: 1–5–2
- Head coach: Aldo Donelli (10th season)
- Home stadium: Boston University Field

1956 Eastern major college football independents records
	Conf.			Overall
Team	W	L	T	W		L		T
No. 8 Syracuse		–		7	–	2	–	0
Penn State		–		6	–	2	–	1
No. 13 Pittsburgh		–		7	–	3	–	1
Army		–		5	–	3	–	1
Holy Cross		–		5	–	3	–	1
Villanova		–		5	–	4	–	0
Boston College		–		5	–	4	–	0
Colgate		–		4	–	5	–	0
Boston University		–		1	–	5	–	2
Rankings from AP poll

The 1956 Boston University Terriers football team was an American football team that represented Boston University as an independent during the 1956 college football season. In its tenth and final season under head coach Aldo Donelli, the team compiled a 1–5–2 record and was outscored by a total of 166 to 96.

== Schedule ==
Date	Opponent	Site	Result	Attendance	Source
September 29	UMass	Boston University Field; Boston, MA	W 19–6	13,434	
October 6	at William & Mary	Cary Field; Williamsburg, VA	T 18–18	5,000	
October 13	George Washington	Boston University Field; Boston, MA	T 20–20	9,104	
October 20	Villanova	Boston University Field; Boston, MA	L 13–27	12,925	
October 27	Syracuse	Boston University Field; Boston, MA	L 7–21	12,182	
November 3	Holy Cross	Boston University Field; Boston, MA	L 12–21	12,089	
November 10	at Penn State	New Beaver Field; University Park, PA	L 7–40	28,240	
November 17	at Boston College	Fenway Park; Boston, MA (rivalry)	L 0–13	15,077	
