= 1956 Colgate Red Raiders football team =

American college football season

1956 Colgate Red Raiders football
- Conference: Independent
- Record: 4–5
- Head coach: Hal Lahar (5th season)
- Captain: James Yurak
- Home stadium: Colgate Athletic Field

1956 Eastern major college football independents records
	Conf.			Overall
Team	W	L	T	W		L		T
No. 8 Syracuse		–		7	–	2	–	0
Penn State		–		6	–	2	–	1
No. 13 Pittsburgh		–		7	–	3	–	1
Army		–		5	–	3	–	1
Holy Cross		–		5	–	3	–	1
Villanova		–		5	–	4	–	0
Boston College		–		5	–	4	–	0
Colgate		–		4	–	5	–	0
Boston University		–		1	–	5	–	2
Rankings from AP poll

The 1956 Colgate Red Raiders football team was an American football team that represented Colgate University as an independent during the 1956 college football season. In its fifth season under head coach Hal Lahar, the team compiled a 4–5 record. James Yurak was the team captain.

The team played its home games at Colgate Athletic Field in Hamilton, New York.

== Schedule ==
Date	Opponent	Site	Result	Attendance	Source
September 29	Cornell	Colgate Athletic Field; Hamilton, NY (rivalry)	W 34–6	12,000	
October 6	at Holy Cross	Fitton Field; Worcester, MA	L 6–20	12,000	
October 13	at Rutgers	Rutgers Stadium; Piscataway, NJ	W 48–6	11,000	
October 20	at Princeton	Palmer Stadium; Princeton, NJ	L 20–28	32,000	
October 27	at Yale	Yale Bowl; New Haven, CT	W 14–6	38,236	
November 3	at Army	Michie Stadium; West Point, NY	L 46–55	27,400–28,000	
November 10	Bucknell	Colgate Athletic Field; Hamilton, NY	W 26–12	5,000	
November 17	at No. 9 Syracuse	Archbold Stadium; Syracuse, NY (rivalry)	L 7–61	39,701	
November 22	at Brown	Brown Stadium; Providence, RI	L 0–20	10,500	
Rankings from AP Poll released prior to the game; Source:

== Leading players ==
Statistical leaders for the 1956 Red Raiders included:

- Rushing: John Call, 479 yards and 11 touchdowns on 82 attempts
- Passing: Guy Martin, 1,100 yards, 88 completions and 9 touchdowns on 170 attempts
- Receiving: Alfred Jamison, 289 yards and 6 touchdowns on 29 receptions
- Scoring: John Call, 66 points from 11 touchdowns
- All-purpose yards: John Call, 1,000 yards (479 rushing, 236 kickoff returning, 231 receiving, 53 punt returning, 1 interception returning)
