= 1956 Villanova Wildcats football team =

American college football season

1956 Villanova Wildcats football
- Conference: Independent
- Record: 5–4
- Head coach: Frank Reagan (3rd season)
- Captain: Joseph Ryan
- Home stadium: Philadelphia Municipal Stadium, Villanova Stadium

1956 Eastern major college football independents records
	Conf.			Overall
Team	W	L	T	W		L		T
No. 8 Syracuse		–		7	–	2	–	0
Penn State		–		6	–	2	–	1
No. 13 Pittsburgh		–		7	–	3	–	1
Army		–		5	–	3	–	1
Holy Cross		–		5	–	3	–	1
Villanova		–		5	–	4	–	0
Boston College		–		5	–	4	–	0
Colgate		–		4	–	5	–	0
Boston University		–		1	–	5	–	2
Rankings from AP poll

The 1956 Villanova Wildcats football team represented the Villanova University during the 1956 college football season. The head coach was Frank Reagan, coaching his third season with the Wildcats. The team played their home games at Villanova Stadium in Villanova, Pennsylvania.

== Schedule ==
Date	Opponent	Site	Result	Attendance	Source
September 22	at No. 9 Texas A&M	Kyle Field; College Station, TX	L 0–19	15,000	
September 29	at Detroit	University of Detroit Stadium; Detroit, MI	W 8–7	10,123–10,143	
October 13	at Dayton	UD Stadium; Dayton, OH	W 13–0	11,000	
October 20	at Boston University	Boston University Field; Boston, MA	W 27–13	12,925	
October 27	Florida State	Philadelphia Municipal Stadium; Philadelphia, PA	L 13–20	42,691	
November 3	at Boston College	Fenway Park; Boston, MA	L 6–7	13,275	
November 10	The Citadel	Villanova Stadium; Villanova, PA	W 46–0	7,500	
November 17	at Houston	Rice Stadium; Houston, TX	L 13–26	15,000	
November 24	Iowa State	Villanova Stadium; Villanova, PA	W 26–0	5,000	
Rankings from AP Poll released prior to the game; Source:
