= 1956 Cornell Big Red football team =

American college football season

1956 Cornell Big Red football
- Conference: Ivy League
- Record: 1–8 (1–6 Ivy)
- Head coach: George K. James (10th season)
- Captain: Art Boland
- Home stadium: Schoellkopf Field

1956 Ivy League football standings
	Conf.					Overall
Team	W		L		T	W		L		T
Yale $	7	–	0	–	0	8	–	1	–	0
Princeton	5	–	2	–	0	7	–	2	–	0
Dartmouth	4	–	3	–	0	5	–	4	–	0
Penn	4	–	3	–	0	4	–	5	–	0
Brown	3	–	4	–	0	5	–	4	–	0
Columbia	2	–	5	–	0	3	–	6	–	0
Harvard	2	–	5	–	0	2	–	6	–	0
Cornell	1	–	6	–	0	1	–	8	–	0
$ – Conference champion

The 1956 Cornell Big Red football team was an American football team that represented Cornell University as a member of the Ivy League during the 1956 college football season.

In its tenth season under head coach George K. James, the team compiled a 1–8 record and was outscored 209 to 100. Art Boland was the team captain.

Cornell's 1–6 conference record ranked last in the Ivy League. This was the first season of formal play for the league, although the Big Red's previous independent schedules, dating back to the 19th century, often featured future Ivy opponents. All seven Ivy matchups on Cornell's 1956 schedule had been present on the 1955 slate, as well (as had one of the non-conference opponents, Colgate).

Cornell played its home games at Schoellkopf Field in Ithaca, New York.

== Schedule ==
Date	Opponent	Site	Result	Attendance	Source
September 29	at Colgate*	Colgate Athletic Field; Hamilton, NY (rivalry)	L 6–34	12,000	
October 6	Navy*	Schoellkopf Field; Ithaca, NY	L 0–14	20,000	
October 13	Harvard^{†}	Schoellkopf Field; Ithaca, NY	L 7–32	14,000	
October 20	at Yale	Yale Bowl; New Haven, CT	L 7–25	32,000	
October 27	Princeton	Schoellkopf Field; Ithaca, NY	L 21–32	17,000	
November 3	at Columbia	Baker Field; New York, NY (rivalry)	L 19–25	12,000	
November 10	at Brown	Brown Stadium; Providence, RI	L 6–13	10,000	
November 17	Dartmouth	Schoellkopf Field; Ithaca, NY (rivalry)	L 14–27	15,000	
November 22	at Penn	Franklin Field; Philadelphia, PA (rivalry)	W 20–7	17,575	
*Non-conference game; ^{†}Homecoming
