= 1956 Gator Bowl =

American college football game

Georgia Tech Yellow Jackets	Pittsburgh Panthers
(9–1)	(7–2–1)
SEC	Independent
21	14
Head coach: Bobby Dodd	Head coach: John Michelosen
AP / Coaches; 4 / 4	AP / Coaches; 13 / 12
	1	2	3	4	Total
Georgia Tech	7	7	7	0	21
Pittsburgh	0	7	7	0	14
- Date: December 29, 1956
- Season: 1956
- Stadium: Gator Bowl Stadium
- Location: Jacksonville, Florida
- MVP: QB Wade Mitchell (Georgia Tech); QB Corny Salvaterra (Pittsburgh)
- Referee: John Coles (EAIFO; split crew: EAIFO, SEC)
- Attendance: 37,683

The 1956 Gator Bowl was an American college football bowl game played on December 29, 1956, at Gator Bowl Stadium in Jacksonville, Florida. The game pitted the Georgia Tech Yellow Jackets and the Pittsburgh Panthers.

== Background ==
Georgia Tech began the season ranked #4, and they started the season with six straight victories, rising to #2 heading into a faceoff with #3 Tennessee, but they lost 6-0. Victoires over Alabama, #13 Florida and Georgia gave them nine victories and an invite to a bowl game for the sixth straight year.

The Panthers began the season ranked #10, along with victories over West Virginia and #7 Syracuse. However, they fell to California 14-0. After victories over Duke and Oregon that made them ranked at #11, they lost to #8 Minnesota, which made them fall to #20. They went 3-0-1 in their final four games, beating Notre Dame, Army, and #6 Miami, while tying Penn State. This was their second straight bowl game.

== Game summary ==
Corny Salvaterra went 3-of-10 for 67 yards, with 16 rushes for 36 yards for Pittsburgh. Pittsburgh had more rushing yards (246 to 162), more passing yards (67 to 45), first downs (16 to 10), but also more turnovers (4 to 1) than Georgia Tech.

The attendance for the game was 37,683.

=== Scoring summary ===
- Georgia Tech - Ken Owen, 3 yard touchdown run (Wade Mitchell kick)
- Georgia Tech - Jerry Nabors, 6 yard touchdown pass from George Volkert (Mitchell kick)
- Pittsburgh - Dick Bowan, 42 yard touchdown pass from Corny Salvaterra (Joe Walton pass from Salvaterra)
- Georgia Tech - Paul Rotenberry, 5 yard touchdown run (Mitchell kick)
- Pittsburgh - Salvaterra, 1 yard touchdown run (kick good)

== Aftermath ==
Georgia Tech did not return to a bowl game until 1960, which was also in the Gator Bowl.

As for Pittsburgh, they did not return to a bowl game again until 1973, or return to the Gator Bowl until 1977.
