= 1956 Penn Quakers football team =

American college football season

1956 Penn Quakers football
- Conference: Ivy League
- Record: 4–5 (4–3 Ivy)
- Head coach: Steve Sebo (3rd season)
- Captains: Charles Gill; Peter Keblish
- Home stadium: Franklin Field

1956 Ivy League football standings
	Conf.					Overall
Team	W		L		T	W		L		T
Yale $	7	–	0	–	0	8	–	1	–	0
Princeton	5	–	2	–	0	7	–	2	–	0
Dartmouth	4	–	3	–	0	5	–	4	–	0
Penn	4	–	3	–	0	4	–	5	–	0
Brown	3	–	4	–	0	5	–	4	–	0
Columbia	2	–	5	–	0	3	–	6	–	0
Harvard	2	–	5	–	0	2	–	6	–	0
Cornell	1	–	6	–	0	1	–	8	–	0
$ – Conference champion

The 1956 Penn Quakers football team was an American football team that represented the University of Pennsylvania as a member of the Ivy League during the 1956 college football season. During its third year under head coach Steve Sebo, this Quakers team compiled a 5–4 record but were outscored 216 to 96. Charles Gill and Peter Keblish were the team captains.

Penn's 4–3 conference record tied for third place in the Ivy League. This was the first season of formal play for the league, and marked the renewal for the Quakers of several rivalries that hadn't been played in recent years. Only four of Penn's 1955 opponents (Cornell, Navy, Penn State, Princeton) carried over to the new season. The rest of the Ivy League teams had not played Penn since 1952 or earlier; Harvard and Yale hadn't been on the schedule since World War II.

Penn played its home games at Franklin Field, adjacent to the university's campus in Philadelphia.

== Schedule ==
Date	Opponent	Site	Result	Attendance	Source
September 29	Penn State*	Franklin Field; Philadelphia, PA	L 0–34	23,390	
October 6	Dartmouth	Franklin Field; Philadelphia, PA	W 14–7	15,569	
October 13	Princeton	Franklin Field; Philadelphia, PA (rivalry)	L 0–34	28,484	
October 20	Brown	Franklin Field; Philadelphia, PA	W 14–7	15,716	
October 27	Navy*	Franklin Field; Philadelphia, PA	L 6–54	24,721	
November 3	at Harvard	Harvard Stadium; Boston, MA (rivalry)	W 28–14	13,000	
November 10	at Yale	Yale Bowl; New Haven, CT	L 7–40	24,500	
November 17	Columbia	Franklin Field; Philadelphia, PA	W 20–6	11,200	
November 22	Cornell	Franklin Field; Philadelphia, PA (rivalry)	L 7–20	17,575	
*Non-conference game
