= 1956 Yale Bulldogs football team =

American college football season

1956 Yale Bulldogs football

Ivy League champion
- Conference: Ivy League

Ranking
- Coaches: No. 17
- Record: 8–1 (7–0 Ivy)
- Head coach: Jordan Olivar (5th season)
- Captain: John Owseichik
- Home stadium: Yale Bowl

1956 Ivy League football standings
| | Conf. | | | | | Overall |
| Team | W | | L | | T | W | | L | | T |
|---|---|---|---|---|---|---|---|---|---|---|
| Yale $ | 7 | – | 0 | – | 0 | 8 | – | 1 | – | 0 |
| Princeton | 5 | – | 2 | – | 0 | 7 | – | 2 | – | 0 |
| Dartmouth | 4 | – | 3 | – | 0 | 5 | – | 4 | – | 0 |
| Penn | 4 | – | 3 | – | 0 | 4 | – | 5 | – | 0 |
| Brown | 3 | – | 4 | – | 0 | 5 | – | 4 | – | 0 |
| Columbia | 2 | – | 5 | – | 0 | 3 | – | 6 | – | 0 |
| Harvard | 2 | – | 5 | – | 0 | 2 | – | 6 | – | 0 |
| Cornell | 1 | – | 6 | – | 0 | 1 | – | 8 | – | 0 |
$ – Conference champion

The 1956 Yale Bulldogs football team represented Yale University in the 1956 college football season as a member of the Ivy League. They were led by fifth-year head coach Jordan Olivar and played their home games at the Yale Bowl. They finished the season as the very first Ivy League champions with an overall record of eight wins and one loss.

== Schedule ==
| Date | Opponent | Site | Result | Attendance | Source |
|---|---|---|---|---|---|
| September 29 | Connecticut* | Yale Bowl; New Haven, CT | W 19–14 | 17,828 | |
| October 6 | Brown | Yale Bowl; New Haven, CT | W 20–2 | 29,904 | |
| October 13 | at Columbia | Baker Field; New York, NY | W 33–19 | 22,000 | |
| October 20 | Cornell | Yale Bowl; New Haven, CT | W 25–7 | 32,000 | |
| October 27 | Colgate* | Yale Bowl; New Haven, CT | L 6–14 | 38,236 | |
| November 3 | Dartmouth | Yale Bowl; New Haven, CT | W 19–0 | 33,000 | |
| November 10 | Penn | Yale Bowl; New Haven, CT | W 40–7 | 24,500 | |
| November 17 | No. 20 Princeton | Yale Bowl; New Haven, CT (rivalry) | W 42–20 | 68,000 | |
| November 24 | at Harvard | Harvard Stadium; Boston, MA (The Game) | W 42–14 | 38,240 | |
*Non-conference game; Rankings from AP Poll released prior to the game

== NFL draft ==
The following Bulldogs were selected in the National Football League draft following the season.

| Round | Pick | Player | Position | NFL team |
|---|---|---|---|---|
| 8 | 91 | Al Ward | B | Chicago Bears |
| 8 | 93 | Paul Lopata | E | Washington Redskins |
| 24 | 278 | Dennis McGill | B | Philadelphia Eagles |
