= 1956 Harvard Crimson football team =

American college football season

1956 Harvard Crimson football
- Conference: Ivy League
- Record: 2–6 (2–5 Ivy)
- Head coach: Lloyd Jordan (7th season)
- Home stadium: Harvard Stadium

1956 Ivy League football standings
	Conf.					Overall
Team	W		L		T	W		L		T
Yale $	7	–	0	–	0	8	–	1	–	0
Princeton	5	–	2	–	0	7	–	2	–	0
Dartmouth	4	–	3	–	0	5	–	4	–	0
Penn	4	–	3	–	0	4	–	5	–	0
Brown	3	–	4	–	0	5	–	4	–	0
Columbia	2	–	5	–	0	3	–	6	–	0
Harvard	2	–	5	–	0	2	–	6	–	0
Cornell	1	–	6	–	0	1	–	8	–	0
$ – Conference champion

The 1956 Harvard Crimson football team represented Harvard University as a member of the Ivy League. The Crimson were led by seventh-year head coach Lloyd Jordan and played their home games at Harvard Stadium in the Allston neighborhood of Boston, Massachusetts.

== Schedule ==
Date	Opponent	Site	Result	Attendance	Source
October 6	Tufts*	Harvard Stadium; Boston, MA	L 13–19	17,500	
October 13	at Cornell	Schoellkopf Field; Ithaca, NY	W 32–7	14,000	
October 20	at Columbia	Baker Field; New York, NY	L 20–26	15,000	
October 27	Dartmouth	Harvard Stadium; Boston, MA (rivalry)	W 28–21	28,500	
November 3	Penn	Harvard Stadium; Boston, MA (rivalry)	L 14–28	13,000	
November 10	at Princeton	Palmer Stadium; Princeton, NJ (rivalry)	L 20–35	34,000	
November 17	Brown	Harvard Stadium; Boston, MA	L 12–21	13,500	
November 24	Yale	Harvard Stadium; Boston, MA (The Game)	L 14–42	38,240	
*Non-conference game
