= 1956 Syracuse Orangemen football team =

American college football season

1956 Syracuse Orangemen football

Eastern champion

Cotton Bowl Classic, L 27–28 vs. TCU
- Conference: Independent

Ranking
- Coaches: No. 8
- AP: No. 8
- Record: 7–2
- Head coach: Ben Schwartzwalder (8th season)
- Captain: Game captains
- Home stadium: Archbold Stadium

1956 Eastern major college football independents records
	Conf.			Overall
Team	W	L	T	W		L		T
No. 8 Syracuse		–		7	–	2	–	0
Penn State		–		6	–	2	–	1
No. 13 Pittsburgh		–		7	–	3	–	1
Army		–		5	–	3	–	1
Holy Cross		–		5	–	3	–	1
Villanova		–		5	–	4	–	0
Boston College		–		5	–	4	–	0
Colgate		–		4	–	5	–	0
Boston University		–		1	–	5	–	2
Rankings from AP poll

The 1956 Syracuse Orangemen football team represented Syracuse University as an independent during the 1956 college football season. The Orangemen were led by eighth-year head coach Ben Schwartzwalder and played their home games at Archbold Stadium in Syracuse, New York. Syracuse finished the regular season with a record of 7–1, and were ranked 8th in both final polls. They were awarded the Lambert Trophy, which signified them as champions of the East. Syracuse was invited to the 1957 Cotton Bowl, where they were defeated by TCU.

The team was led by unanimous All-American halfback Jim Brown. Brown set school records in average yards-per-carry (6.2), single-season rushing yards (986), single-game rushing touchdowns (6, vs. Colgate), and most points scored in a game (43, vs. Colgate). He was drafted sixth overall in the 1957 NFL draft and went on to become one of the most celebrated professional athletes of all time.

== Schedule ==
Date	Opponent	Rank	Site	Result	Attendance	Source
September 22	at No. 6 Maryland		Byrd Stadium; College Park, MD	W 26–12	27,000	
September 29	at No. 10 Pittsburgh	No. 7	Pitt Stadium; Pittsburgh, PA	L 7–14	49,287	
October 13	No. 20 West Virginia		Archbold Stadium; Syracuse, NY (rivalry)	W 27–20	25,000	
October 20	Army	No. 13	Archbold Stadium; Syracuse, NY	W 7–0	40,053	
October 27	at Boston University	No. 14	Boston University Field; Boston, MA	W 21–7	12,182	
November 3	No. 12 Penn State	No. 17	Archbold Stadium; Syracuse, NY (rivalry)	W 13–9	35,475	
November 10	Holy Cross	No. 9	Archbold Stadium; Syracuse, NY	W 41–20	17,000	
November 17	Colgate	No. 9	Archbold Stadium; Syracuse, NY (rivalry)	W 61–7	39,701	
January 1	vs. No. 14 TCU	No. 8	Cotton Bowl; Dallas, TX (Cotton Bowl Classic)	L 27–28	61,500–68,000	
Rankings from AP Poll released prior to the game; Source:

== Roster ==
- HB Jim Brown, Sr.
- HB Tom Sardinia, Sr.

== Team players in the NFL ==
Player	Round	Pick	Position	Club
Jim Brown	1	6	Running back	Cleveland Browns
Jimmy Ridlon	4	39	Defensive back	49ers
Bill E. Brown	9	108	Linebacker	Chicago Bears
Jerry Cashman	14	158	Tackle	Eagle

== Awards and honors ==
- Jim Brown, unanimous first team All-American (AFCA, AP, UP, INS, CP, NEA, WCF, FWAA)
- Jim Brown, Cotton Bowl Classic co-Most Valuable Player
