= 1956 Dartmouth Indians football team =

American college football season

1956 Dartmouth Indians football
- Conference: Ivy League
- Record: 5–3–1 (4–3 Ivy)
- Head coach: Bob Blackman (2nd season)
- Captain: Robert Rex
- Home stadium: Memorial Field

1956 Ivy League football standings
	Conf.					Overall
Team	W		L		T	W		L		T
Yale $	7	–	0	–	0	8	–	1	–	0
Princeton	5	–	2	–	0	7	–	2	–	0
Dartmouth	4	–	3	–	0	5	–	4	–	0
Penn	4	–	3	–	0	4	–	5	–	0
Brown	3	–	4	–	0	5	–	4	–	0
Columbia	2	–	5	–	0	3	–	6	–	0
Harvard	2	–	5	–	0	2	–	6	–	0
Cornell	1	–	6	–	0	1	–	8	–	0
$ – Conference champion

The 1956 Dartmouth Indians football team was an American football team that represented Dartmouth College as a member of the Ivy League during the 1956 college football season.

In their second season under head coach Bob Blackman, the Indians compiled a 5–3–1 record, and outscored opponents 122 to 89. Robert Rex was the team captain.

The Indians' 4–3 conference record tied for third place in the Ivy League. This was the first season of formal play for the league, although the Indians' previous independent schedules, dating back to the 19th century, often featured future Ivy opponents. Six of the seven Ivy matchups on Dartmouth's 1956 schedule had been present on the 1955 slate, as well (as had one of the non-conference opponents, Holy Cross).

Dartmouth played its home games at Memorial Field on the college campus in Hanover, New Hampshire.

== Schedule ==
Date	Opponent	Site	Result	Attendance	Source
September 29	New Hampshire*	Memorial Field; Hanover, NH (rivalry)	W 13–0	9,500	
October 6	at Penn	Franklin Field; Philadelphia, PA	L 7–14	15,569	
October 13	at Brown	Brown Stadium; Providence, RI	W 14–7	12,500	
October 20	Holy Cross*	Memorial Field; Hanover, NH	T 7–7	12,000	
October 27	at Harvard	Harvard Stadium; Boston, MA (rivalry)	L 21–28	28,500	
November 3	at Yale	Yale Bowl; New Haven, CT	L 0–19	33,000	
November 10	Columbia	Memorial Field; Hanover, NH	W 14–0	9,000	
November 17	at Cornell	Schoellkopf Field; Ithaca, NY (rivalry)	W 27–14	15,000	
November 24	at Princeton	Palmer Stadium; Princeton, NJ	W 19–0	32,000	
*Non-conference game
