= 1956 Princeton Tigers football team =

American college football season

1956 Princeton Tigers football
- Conference: Ivy League
- Record: 7–2 (5–2 Ivy)
- Head coach: Charlie Caldwell (12th season)
- Captain: Michael E. Bowman
- Home stadium: Palmer Stadium

1956 Ivy League football standings
	Conf.					Overall
Team	W		L		T	W		L		T
Yale $	7	–	0	–	0	8	–	1	–	0
Princeton	5	–	2	–	0	7	–	2	–	0
Dartmouth	4	–	3	–	0	5	–	4	–	0
Penn	4	–	3	–	0	4	–	5	–	0
Brown	3	–	4	–	0	5	–	4	–	0
Columbia	2	–	5	–	0	3	–	6	–	0
Harvard	2	–	5	–	0	2	–	6	–	0
Cornell	1	–	6	–	0	1	–	8	–	0
$ – Conference champion

The 1956 Princeton Tigers football team was an American football team that represented Princeton University as a member of the Ivy League during the 1956 college football season.

In their 12th and final year under head coach Charlie Caldwell, the Tigers compiled a 7–2 record and outscored opponents 237 to 135. Michael E. Bowman was the team captain.

After starting the year 7–0, Princeton briefly appeared as No. 20 in the AP poll, but only remained ranked for one week.

Princeton's 5–2 conference record secured second place in the Ivy League standings. This was the first season of formal play for the league, although the Tigers' previous independent schedules, dating back to the 19th century, often featured future Ivy opponents. All seven Ivy matchups on Princeton's 1956 schedule had been present on the 1955 slate, as well (as had both non-conference opponents, Colgate and Rutgers).

Princeton played its home games at Palmer Stadium on the university campus in Princeton, New Jersey.

== Schedule ==
Date	Opponent	Rank	Site	Result	Attendance	Source
September 29	Rutgers*		Palmer Stadium; Princeton, NJ (rivalry)	W 28–6	26,000	
October 6	Columbia		Palmer Stadium; Princeton, NJ	W 39–0	16,000	
October 13	at Penn		Franklin Field; Philadelphia, PA (rivalry)	W 34–0	28,484	
October 20	Colgate*		Palmer Stadium; Princeton, NJ	W 28–20	32,000	
October 27	at Cornell		Schoellkopf Field; Ithaca, NY (rivalry)	W 32–21	17,000	
November 3	Brown		Palmer Stadium; Princeton, NJ	W 21–7	15,000	
November 10	Harvard		Palmer Stadium; Princeton, NJ (rivalry)	W 35–20	34,000	
November 17	at Yale	No. 20	Yale Bowl; New Haven, CT (rivalry)	L 20–42	68,000	
November 24	Dartmouth		Palmer Stadium; Princeton, NJ	L 0–19	32,000	
*Non-conference game; Rankings from AP Poll released prior to the game
