= 1956 Columbia Lions football team =

American college football season

1956 Columbia Lions football
- Conference: Ivy League
- Record: 3–6 (2–5 Ivy)
- Head coach: Lou Little (27th season)
- Captain: Arthur Wilson
- Home stadium: Baker Field

1956 Ivy League football standings
	Conf.					Overall
Team	W		L		T	W		L		T
Yale $	7	–	0	–	0	8	–	1	–	0
Princeton	5	–	2	–	0	7	–	2	–	0
Dartmouth	4	–	3	–	0	5	–	4	–	0
Penn	4	–	3	–	0	4	–	5	–	0
Brown	3	–	4	–	0	5	–	4	–	0
Columbia	2	–	5	–	0	3	–	6	–	0
Harvard	2	–	5	–	0	2	–	6	–	0
Cornell	1	–	6	–	0	1	–	8	–	0
$ – Conference champion

The 1956 Columbia Lions football team was an American football team that represented Columbia University as a member of the Ivy League during the 1956 college football season.

In their 27th and final season under head coach Lou Little, the Lions compiled a 3–6 record and were outscored 237 to 94. Arthur Wilson was the team captain.

The Lions' 2–5 conference record tied for sixth place in the Ivy League. This was the first season of formal play for the league, although the Lions' previous independent schedules, dating back to the 19th century, often featured future Ivy opponents. Six of the seven Ivy matchups on Columbia's 1956 schedule had been present on the 1955 slate, as well (as had the two remaining non-Ivy fixtures, Army and Rutgers).

Columbia played its home games at Baker Field in Upper Manhattan, in New York City.

== Schedule ==
Date	Opponent	Site	Result	Attendance	Source
September 29	Brown	Baker Field; New York, NY	L 0–20	12,000	
October 6	at Princeton	Palmer Stadium; Princeton, NJ	L 0–39	16,000	
October 13	Yale^{†}	Baker Field; New York, NY	L 19–33	22,000	
October 20	Harvard	Baker Field; New York, NY	W 26–20	15,000	
October 27	Army*	Baker Field; New York, NY	L 0–60	20,000	
November 3	Cornell	Baker Field; New York, NY (rivalry)	W 25–19	12,000	
November 10	at Dartmouth	Memorial Field; Hanover, NH	L 0–14	9,000	
November 17	at Penn	Franklin Field; Philadelphia, PA	L 6–20	11,200	
November 24	at Rutgers*	Rutgers Stadium; Piscataway, NJ	W 18–12	9,000	
*Non-conference game; ^{†}Homecoming
