= 1956 Pittsburgh Panthers football team =

American college football season

1956 Pittsburgh Panthers football

Gator Bowl, L 14–21 vs. Georgia Tech
- Conference: Independent

Ranking
- Coaches: No. 12
- AP: No. 13
- Record: 7–3–1
- Head coach: John Michelosen (2nd season)
- Home stadium: Pitt Stadium

1956 Eastern major college football independents records
	Conf.			Overall
Team	W	L	T	W		L		T
No. 8 Syracuse		–		7	–	2	–	0
Penn State		–		6	–	2	–	1
No. 13 Pittsburgh		–		7	–	3	–	1
Army		–		5	–	3	–	1
Holy Cross		–		5	–	3	–	1
Villanova		–		5	–	4	–	0
Boston College		–		5	–	4	–	0
Colgate		–		4	–	5	–	0
Boston University		–		1	–	5	–	2
Rankings from AP poll

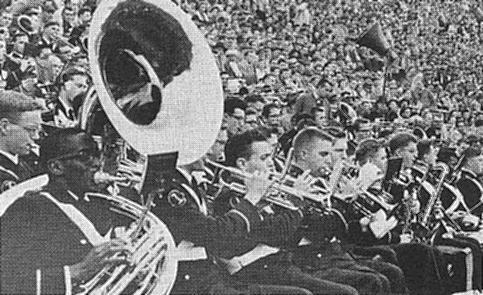
The brass section of the University of Pittsburgh Varsity Marching Band blares out "Hail to Pitt" during a 1956 Pitt football game against Syracuse University.

The 1956 Pittsburgh Panthers football team represented the University of Pittsburgh as an independent during the 1956 college football season. Led by second-year head coach John Michelosen, the Panthers compiled a record of 7–3–1 with a loss in the Gator Bowl to Georgia Tech. The team played home games at Pitt Stadium in Pittsburgh.

== Schedule ==
Date	Opponent	Rank	Site	TV	Result	Attendance	Source
September 22	at West Virginia	No. 10	Mountaineer Field; Morgantown, WV		W 14–13	34,800	
September 29	No. 7 Syracuse	No. 10	Pitt Stadium; Pittsburgh, PA		W 14–7	49,287	
October 6	at California	No. 7	California Memorial Stadium; Berkeley, CA		L 0–14	31,000	
October 20	vs. Duke	No. 16	Foreman Field; Norfolk, VA (Oyster Bowl)		W 27–14	26,000–27,000	
October 27	Oregon	No. 13	Pitt Stadium; Pittsburgh, PA		W 14–7	36,872	
November 3	at No. 8 Minnesota	No. 11	Memorial Stadium; Minneapolis, MN		L 6–9	63,579	
November 10	Notre Dame	No. 20	Pitt Stadium; Pittsburgh, PA		W 26–13	58,697	
November 17	Army	No. 16	Pitt Stadium; Pittsburgh, PA		W 20–7	55,639	
November 24	Penn State	No. 14	Pitt Stadium; Pittsburgh, PA (rivalry)		T 7–7	51,123	
December 8	at No. 6 Miami (FL)	No. 12	Burdine Stadium; Miami, FL	NBC	W 14–7	38,243	
December 29	vs. No. 4 Georgia Tech	No. 13	Gator Bowl Stadium; Jacksonville, FL (Gator Bowl)	CBS	L 14–21	37,683	
Rankings from AP Poll released prior to the game

== Preseason ==
After leading the Panthers to their best record since 1938, plus a bowl game, Coach Michelosen was a popular Pittsburgh sports figure on the banquet circuit. On January 19, he was honored by the Ambridge Quarterback Club with a plaque from the club, a silver sugar bowl from the fans, and another plaque from the American Legion. On February 12, he was feted at the Post-Gazette Dapper Dan Club and received the 1955 Pittsburgh Man of the Year in Sports award. On April 17, he was honored by the B'Nai B'Rith at their second annual Sports Award Night as outstanding district grid coach.

Michelosen started his second season of spring drills on March 23 at Ellsworth Field. 85 aspirants, including 20 non-scholarship athletes and 20 lettermen, took part in the twenty sessions allowed by the NCAA. On April 28, the high school coaches clinic and final scrimmage took place at the stadium. Three thousand fans attended and watched the Blues beat the Whites 36–18.

On August 30, the Pitt ticket office reported that the Notre Dame game was sold out. The earliest sellout in Pitt history.

Pitt freshmen coach Steve Petro was assisted by former Panthers Dick Deitrick and Rudy Mattioli. He booked a four game schedule for his squad.(West Virginia, Penn State, Navy and Kent State)

On September 1, fifty-two varsity gridders began three weeks of fall practice at Ellsworth Field in preparation for their opening game on September 22 at West Virginia. Sophomore end Bob Hook broke his ankle during a scrimmage, and was lost for the season.

== Game summaries ==
=== at West Virginia ===
Week 1: Pitt at West Virginia

Team	1	2	3	4	Total
• Pitt	0	0	14	0	14
West Virginia	0	6	0	7	13

- Date: September 22, 1956
- Location: Mountaineer Field
  Morgantown, WV
- Game start: 1:30 p.m.
- Game attendance: 34,800
- Game weather: warm and sunny
- Referee: J. D. Rogers

Scoring summary
2	WVU	Mickey Trimarki 1-yard sneak (Jim Pickett missed kick)	WVU 6–0
3	PITT	Ray DiPasquale 2-yard run (Ambrose Bagamery kick)	PITT 7–6
3	PITT	Nick Passodelis 5-yard run (Darrell Lewis kick)	PITT 14–6
4	WVU	Mickey Trimarki 1-yard sneak (Jim Pickett kick)	PITT 14–13

Coach John Michelosen's second season began with a trip to Morgantown for the forty-ninth renewal of the Backyard Brawl. Two years in a row, the Mountaineers were undefeated and supposedly bowl bound until they were upset by the Panthers. Art Lewis's roster was highlighted by center Chuck Howley. The game had been sold out since August 18, the earliest sellout ever for WVU.

The #10 ranked Panthers were favored by 7 1/2 points and led the all-time series 36–11–1. They were undefeated in Morgantown. After a short practice on Friday, the Panthers contingent bussed to Waynesburg, PA, and housed at the Jackson Hotel. Panther ends, Joe Walton (leg bruise) and Dale Brown (ribs), were nursing injuries, but were expected to play.

The 34,800 fans were treated to a true “backyard brawl” as the Panthers earned a 14–13 victory. The Mountaineers were in Pitt territory most of the first quarter, but the Panthers defense held at their 34-yard line and again on their 36-yard line. Then, Pitt fullback Tom Jenkins fumbled on the 19-yard line, and end Joe Kopinsky recovered for the Mountaineers. The first play of the second quarter was a pass to Kopinsky on the 1-yard line. Quarterback Mickey Trimarti scored on the next play, but Jim Pickett's placement went wide. The Panthers stopped another Mountaineer drive with a Dick Bowen interception before halftime. At the start of the third quarter, the Mountaineers drove to the Pitt 41-yard line. Tom Jenkins intercepted a Trimarti pass, but the West Virginia defense forced a punt. Jenkins boomed a 54-yard punt that rolled dead on the 3-yard line. On first down, West Virginia back Larry Krutko fumbled and Pitt guard Vince Scorsone recovered on the 2-yard line. On second down Ray DiPasquale ran around left end to tie the game. Ambrose Bagamery's placement put Pitt ahead 7–6. On the ensuing kick-off, Panthers John Pollock and Dick Scherer separated Ralph Anastasio from the ball, and Bagamery recovered for the Panthers on the Mountaineers 20-yard line. The Panthers scored in five plays. Nick Passodelis's run through the middle for the last 5 yards upped the lead to 13–6. Darrell Lewis kicked this extra point and Pitt led 14–6. West Virginia answered with a 67-yard drive aided by two Pitt penalties (unnecessary roughness for 15 yards, offsides for 5 yards). Trimarti's quarterback sneak and Joe Pickett's kick tightened the score to 14–13. West Virginia missed two field goals in the final period – an 8-yard attempt by Pickett and a 38-yard attempt by Bob Guesman.

Pitt had 5 first downs, was assessed 100 yards on 10 penalties and lost 3 fumbles. On the positive side, the Pitt defense intercepted 4 passes, recovered 2 fumbles and Tom Jenkins punted 5 times for an average of 41.6 yards.

The Pitt starting lineup for the game against West Virginia was Joe Walton (left end), Bob Pollock (left tackle), Vince Scorsone (left guard), Charles Breuckman (center), Dan Wisniewski (right guard), Herman Canil (right tackle), Dick Scherer (right end), Corny Salvaterra (quarterback), Dick Bowen (left halfback), Ray DiPasquale (right halfback) and Tom Jenkins (fullback). Substitutes appearing in the game for Pitt were Ron Kissel, John Guzik, Don Crafton, Tom Salwoki, Dick Carr, Jim McCusker, Bob Rosborough, Dale Brown, Darrell Lewis, Corky Cost, Nick Passodelis, Ambrose Bagamery, Jim Theodore and Ralph Jelic.

=== Syracuse ===
Week 2: Syracuse at Pitt

Team	1	2	3	4	Total
Syracuse	0	7	0	0	7
• Pitt	0	7	7	0	14

- Date: September 29, 1956
- Location: Pitt Stadium
  Pittsburgh, PA
- Game start: 1:30 p.m.
- Game attendance: 49,287
- Game weather: sunny and warm
- Referee: Gerald F. Hogan

Scoring summary
2	SYR	Ed Coffin 65-yard interception return (Jim Brown kick)	SYR 7–0
3	PITT	Corny Salvaterra 1-yard sneak (Ambrose Bagamery kick)	TIED 7–7
4	PITT	Joe Walton 19-yard touchdown pass from Darrell Lewis (Ambrose Bagamery kick)	PITT 14–7

On September 29, the Panthers welcomed the Syracuse Orangemen for their home opener. Coach Ben Schwartzwalder's #7-ranked squad was 1–0, having beaten Maryland (26–12). Syracuse was led on offense by All-American and future Hall of Famer Jim Brown.

Pitt led the all-time series 7–2–2, and was favored by 6 points. More than 40,000 fans were expected, including a record 8,000 Boy Scouts. An aerial show by the Pensacola Naval Air Cadets added to the entertainment.

Both second string guards were injured in the WVU game. John Guzik broke his leg, and was out for the season. Dick Carr injured his knee and could not play. Coach Michelosen moved Ed Michaels and Ed Humeston into their positions. Halfback Joe Scisly was hurt (shoulder) in practice and did not play.

The Panthers stayed unbeaten with a 14–7 victory over the Orangemen. After a scoreless first period, Syracuse fullback Ed Coffin intercepted a Darrell Lewis pass and raced 55 yards for the touchdown early in the second. Jim Brown added the extra point and Pitt trailed 7–0. Late in the second quarter, Pitt gained possession on the Syracuse 30-yard line. The Panthers needed seven running plays to score, with Corny Salvaterra gaining the final yard on a quarterback sneak. Ambrose Bagamery's placement tied the score. In the third quarter, Pitt gained possession on the Syracuse 49-yard line. Again it took 7 plays. A 19-yard pass to Joe Walton put the Panthers ahead. Bagamery added the extra point to make it 14–7. Then the Panthers defense took over and kept Syracuse from scoring.

Jim Theodore led the Panthers rushing attack with 91 yards on 14 carries. Quarterback Darrell Lewis was 4 of 8 for 44 yards with a touchdown pass and an interception. The Pitt defense held Jim Brown to 52 yards rushing.

The Pitt starting lineup for the game against Syracuse was Joe Walton (left end), Bob Pollock (left tackle), Vince Scorsone (left guard), Charles Breuckman (center), Dan Wisniewski (right guard), Herman Canil (right tackle), Dick Scherer (right end), Corny Salvaterra (quarterback), Dick Bowen (left halfback), Ray DiPasquale (right halfback) and Tom Jenkins (fullback). Substitutes appearing in the game for Pitt were Ron Kissel, Ed Michaels, Ed Humeston, Tom Salwoki, Jim McCusker, Jim Zanos, Bob Rosborough, Dale Brown, Darrell Lewis, Corky Cost, Nick Passodelis, Ambrose Bagamery, Jim Theodore, Dick Haley and Ralph Jelic.

=== at California ===
Week 3: Pitt at California

Team	1	2	3	4	Total
Pitt	0	0	0	0	0
• California	0	7	7	0	14

- Date: October 6, 1956
- Location: California Memorial Stadium
  Berkeley, CA
- Game start: 2:00 p.m.
- Game attendance: 31,000
- Game weather: foggy and chilly
- Referee: John Kennedy

Scoring summary
1	CAL	Norm Becker 20-yard touchdown pass from Gus Gianulias (Gus Gianulis kick)	CAL 7–0
3	CAL	Herb Jackson 1-yard run (Darrell Roberts kick)	CAL 14–0n

On week three, the #7 Panthers flew to the west coast to play the Cal Bears at Berkeley, CA. Cal was 0–2, having lost to Baylor and Illinois. Coach Pappy Waldorf had 17 returning lettermen on his squad that lost to the Panthers in 1955.

The flight to San Francisco was 10 hours, with a stop in Kansas City, MO for gas. The Panthers arrived and immediately were bussed to the Alameda Naval Air Training Station for a workout. Dinner followed at the Claremont Hotel (around 11 p.m. Pittsburgh time).

The California Bears ruined the Pitt road trip with a 14–0 upset. The Panther offense managed to drive to the Bears 35, 39 and 15 yard lines in the first half, but penalties and a staunch defense kept them out of the end zone. Pitt had 80 yards of penalties in the first half to 0 for the Bears. The Bears scored in the second quarter on an 8 play, 54-yard drive that ended with a 20-yard touchdown pass from Gus Gianulias to Norm Becker. Gianulias added the extra point for a 7–0 Cal lead at halftime. The Bears added another score in the third period. A 6-play, 51-yard drive ended on a 1-yard plunge by Herb Jackson. Darrell Roberts' placement closed the scoring. Both teams used their third-string quarterback in the final period. Bill Kalidan of the Panthers completed 3 of 9 passes for 29 yards and threw 2 interceptions. Future All-American Joe Kapp completed 8 of 10 passes for 51 yards.

The coaches summed it up very well. Michelosen said: “That was a pretty good California team out there today. They certainly pushed us around the field.” Waldorf answered: “That was the best football played at Cal in at least three years.”

The Pitt starting lineup for the game against California was Joe Walton (left end), Bob Pollock (left tackle), Vince Scorsone (left guard), Charles Brueckman (center), Dan Wisniewski (right guard), Herman Canil (right tackle), Bob Rosborough (right end), Darrell Lewis (quarterback), Dick Bowen (left halfback), Ray DiPasquale (right halfback) and Tom Jenkins (fullback). Substitutes appearing in the game for Pitt were Ron Kissel, Bob Kiesel, Ed Michaels, Tom Salwoki, Jim McCusker, Joe Pullekines, Dick Scherer, Dale Brown, Corny Salvaterra, Bill Kaliden, Corky Cost, Nick Passodelis, Ambrose Bagamery, Jim Theodore, Dick Haley and Ralph Jelic.

=== vs Duke—Oyster Bowl ===
Week 4: Duke vs. Pitt

Team	1	2	3	4	Total
Duke	7	0	7	0	14
• Pitt	0	20	0	7	27

- Date: October 20, 1956
- Location: Foreman Field
  Norfolk, VA
- Game start: 2:15 p.m.
- Game attendance: 27,000
- Game weather: cloudy and windy
- Referee: John H. Coles

Scoring summary
1	DUKE	Bernie Blaney 98-yard kick-off return (Buddy Bass kick)	DUKE 7–0
2	PITT	Corny Salvaterra 7-yard run (Ambrose Bagamery kick)	TIED 7–7
2	PITT	Joe Walton 27-yard touchdown pass from Corny Salvaterra (Darrell Lewis kick)	PITT 14–7
2	PITT	Joe Walton 59-yard touchdown pass from Darrell Lewis (Darrell Lewis kick missed)	PITT 20–7
3	DUKE	Eddie Rushton 77-yard run (Buddy Bass kick)	PITT 20–14
4	PITT	Ray DiPasquale 1-yard plunge (Corny Salvaterra run)	PITT 27–14

On October 20, the Panthers traveled to Norfolk, VA to play the Duke Blue Devils in the Tenth Annual Oyster Bowl Game. The proceeds went to the Shriners Hospital for Crippled Children. Coach Bill Murray's squad was 2–2 on the season. Duke led the all-time series 6–4. The Devils were led at quarterback by Sonny Jurgensen. He was injured and only played a few snaps. In addition, end Bill Thompson, center Jack Harrison and guard Ray Hord did not make the trip.

Three Panthers were injured and did not make the trip: halfback Dick Bowen, fullback Tom Jenkins and tackle Art Gob. The flight was bumpy and several Panthers became air sick. Since Pitt was designated the home team, the officials were from the East. Coach Michelosen named a new starting backfield: quarterback Corny Salvaterra, halfbacks Jim Theodore and Dick Haley and fullback Ralph Jelic.

The #16 ranked Panthers defeated the Blue Devils 27–14. Duke scored first. Halfback Bernie Blaney caught the kick-off on his 3-yard line and raced 97 yards behind superb blocking for the touchdown. Buddy Bass made it 7–0 Duke. Pitt answered with three touchdowns in the second quarter. Corny Salvaterra directed a 13-play, 67-yard drive, which he concluded with a 7 yard off-tackle option play for the score. Ambrose Bagamery made the extra point to tie the game. After a Duke punt, Salvaterra threw a 27-yard touchdown pass to Joe Walton. Darrell Lewis booted the extra point and Pitt led 14–7. The Panthers defense forced another punt and gained possession on their own 41-yard line. On second down Darrell Lewis threw a 59-yard scoring pass to Joe Walton. Lewis missed the point after and Pitt led 20–7 at halftime. In the third quarter, the Panthers were driving in Duke territory. Salvaterra ran an option play, and in his haste to lateral, he tossed the ball to Duke back Eddie Rushton, who ran unmolested for 77 yards to the end zone. Buddy Bass's placement made the score 20–14. The Panthers defense stopped Duke drives at their 13-yard line and then again on their 27-yard line. The Pitt offense capitalized on that last stop and went 73 yards for the final score. Ray DiPasquale ran around left end from the 1-yard line. Salvaterra ran for the extra point.

Corny Salvaterra was voted Most Valuable Player of the game, and received the M. T. Blassingham Trophy.

The Pitt starting lineup for the game against Duke was Joe Walton (left end), Bob Pollock (left tackle), Vince Scorsone (left guard), Charles Brueckman (center), Dan Wisniewski (right guard), Herman Canil (right tackle), Dick Scherer (right end), Corny Salvaterra (quarterback), Jim Theodore (left halfback), Ray DiPasquale (right halfback) and Ralph Jelic (fullback). Substitutes appearing in the game for Pitt were Ron Kissel, Bob Kiesel, Ed Michaels, Tom Salwoki, Jim McCusker, Dick Carr, Bob Rosborough, Dale Brown, Jim Zanos, Darrell Lewis, Bill Kaliden, Corky Cost, Nick Passodelis, Ambrose Bagamery, Bob Stark and Dick Haley.

=== Oregon ===
Week 5: Oregon at Pitt

Team	1	2	3	4	Total
Oregon	0	0	0	7	7
• Pitt	0	0	7	7	14

- Date: October 27, 1956
- Location: Pitt Stadium
  Pittsburgh, PA
- Game start: 1:30 p.m.
- Game attendance: 36,872
- Game weather: sunny and cool
- Referee: Gerald F. Hogan (Arkansas)

Scoring summary
3	PITT	Jim Theodore 1-yard plunge (Ambrose Bagamery kick)	PITT 7–0
4	PITT	Joe Walton 9-yard pass from Corny Salvaterra (Ambrose Bagamery kick)	PITT 14–0
4	ORE	Fred Miklancic 5-yard run (Leroy Phelps kick)	PITT 14–7

On October 27, the # 13-ranked Panthers hosted the Oregon Ducks of the PCC (Pacific Coast Conference). Oregon was led by ex-Pitt coach Len Casanova, who was in his sixth year at Eugene. The Ducks came east with a 2–3 record. They had a stopover in Denver on their flight, which included a workout at the Air Force Academy. Their starting quarterback, Jack Crabtree, did not make the trip due to injury.

Pitt starting tackle John Pollack twisted his ankle in the Duke game and was replaced by Jim McCusker. This game was the annual High School and Band Day promotion. 7,500 students were expected.

The Panthers improved their record to 4–1 with a 14–7 victory. After a scoreless first half, Oregon drove into Pitt territory and missed a 36-yard field goal. The Panthers answered with their first scoring drive. They went 80 yards in 12 plays, with Jim Theodore going 1-yard over center for the touchdown. Ambrose Bagamery added the extra point. In the fourth quarter, the Panthers gained possession on the Oregon 42-yard line. The offense scored on the fifth play on a 9-yard pass from Corny Salvaterra to Joe Walton. Bagamery converted and Pitt led 14–0. The Ducks got on the scoreboard with less than 2 minutes to play on a Fred Miklancic 5-yard run. Jim Shanley set it up with a 69-yard punt return to the Panthers 14-yard line. Leroy Phelps kicked his 21st straight extra point to close the scoring.

The Pitt starting lineup for the game against Oregon was Joe Walton (left end), Jim McCusker (left tackle), Vince Scorsone (left guard), Charles Brueckman (center), Dan Wisniewski (right guard), Herman Canil (right tackle), Bob Rosborough (right end), Corny Salvaterra (quarterback), Jim Theodore (left halfback), Corky Cost (right halfback) and Ralph Jelic (fullback). Substitutes appearing in the game for Pitt were Ron Kissel, Bob Kiesel, Art Gob, Joe Pullekines, Ed Michaels, Tom Salwoki, Dick Carr, Dick Scherer, Dale Brown, Jim Zanos, Jim Sabatini, Darrell Lewis, Bill Kaliden, Ray DiPasquale, Nick Passodelis, Ambrose Bagamery, Bob Stark, John Flara and Dick Haley.

=== at Minnesota ===
Week 6: Pitt at Minnesota

Team	1	2	3	4	Total
Pitt	0	0	6	0	6
• Minnesota	0	6	0	3	9

- Date: November 3, 1956
- Location: Memorial Stadium
- Game start: 1:30 p.m.
- Game attendance: 63,579
- Game weather: cloudy
- Referee: Rollie Bernum

Scoring summary
2	MINN	Jon Jelacic 8-yard pass from Bobby Cox ( kick missed)	MINN 6–0
3	PITT	Joe Walton 5-yard pass from Corny Salvaterra ( kick missed)	TIED 6–6
4	MINN	Dick Borstad 26-yard field goal	MINN 9–6

For the fourth time in six games the Panthers were on the road. This time they were in Minneapolis to play the #8 ranked Minnesota Gophers. Pitt had never beaten the Gophers. They were 0–8 in the series, and had been out-scored 243–45. Coach Murray Warmuth's squad was 4–0–1 for the season. Their only blemish was a tie with Northwestern.

The Panthers flew into Minneapolis on Friday morning and had a scheduled workout on Memorial Stadium in the afternoon. Tackle Bob Pollack was back in the starting lineup. Halfback Nick Passodelis (bruised side) did not play, and second-string quarterback Darrell Lewis stayed in Pittsburgh with his wife and new born twin daughters.

In front of 63,579 Homecoming fans, Minnesota continued their mastery over the Panthers with a 9–6 victory. The Panthers offense drove the ball to the Gophers 1-yard line twice in the first half and turned the ball over both times by fumbling. In the second quarter the Gophers drove 99-yards in 12 plays for the first score. A fourth-down 8-yard pass from Bob Cox to Jon Jelacic, and Bob Rasmussen's missed kick put Minnesota ahead at halftime 6–0. The Panthers tied the score in the third period on a 10-play, 67-yard drive that ended with a Corny Salvaterra 5-yard jump pass to Joe Walton. Salvaterra missed the extra point. Late in the final period the Panthers had a fourth down and 1-yard to go on their own 32-yard line. Quarterback Bill Kaliden fumbled and recovered, but he was 1-yard short. The Pitt defense then held, and on fourth down Dick Borstad booted a 26-yard field goal. The Panthers answered with a 77-yard touchdown by Joe Walton on the kick-off, but there was a flag for clipping. The Panthers started on their 22-yard line and drove inside the Gophers 30-yard line, where Bob Soltis intercepted a Salvaterra pass to end Pitt's effort.

The Pitt starting lineup for the game against Minnesota was Joe Walton (left end), Bob Pollock (left tackle), Vince Scorsone (left guard), Charles Brueckman (center), Dan Wisniewski (right guard), Herman Canil (right tackle), Bob Rosborough (right end), Corny Salvaterra (quarterback), Ambrose Bagamery (left halfback), Jim Theodore (right halfback) and Ralph Jelic (fullback). Substitutes appearing in the game for Pitt were Ron Kissel, Bob Kiesel, Art Gob, Joe Pullekines, Ed Michaels, Jim McCusker, Tom Salwoki, Dick Carr, Dick Scherer, Dale Brown, Bill Kaliden, Ray DiPasquale, Corky Cost, Tom Jenkins and John Flara.

=== Notre Dame ===
Week 7: Notre Dame at Pitt

Team	1	2	3	4	Total
Notre Dame	0	6	0	7	13
• Pitt	0	13	0	13	26

- Date: November 10, 1956
- Location: Pitt Stadium
  Pittsburgh, PA
- Game start: 1:30 p.m.
- Game attendance: 58,697
- Game weather: cold and windy
- Referee: Albert J. Booth (Yale)

Scoring summary
2	PITT	Corny Salvaterra 11-yard end run ( kick missed)	PITT 6–0
2	PITT	Joe Walton 9-yard pass from Corny Salvaterra (Darrell Lewis kick)	PITT 13–0
2	ND	Paul Hornung 50-yard run (kick missed)	PITT 13–6
4	PITT	Jim Theodore 5-yard run (Ambrose Bagamery kick)	PITT 20–6
4	PITT	Ambrose Bagamery 44-pass from Darrell Lewis (kick missed)	PITT 26–6
4	ND	Bobby Ward 84-yard kick-off return (Paul Hornung kick)	PITT 26–13

On November 10, the Notre Dame Fighting Irish came to Pittsburgh. Notre Dame led the all-time series 15–6–1. Third-year coach Terry Brennan's squad was 1–5 on the season, but his fullback, Paul Hornung, would win the 1956 Heisman Trophy. Hornung was switched from quarterback to fullback due to a jammed thumb. Two starters - guard Bob Gaydos and fullback Dean Studer did not make the trip.

The #20 ranked Panthers were healthy and a two touchdown favorite. The game had been sold out since August. In front of 58,697 fans, the Panthers improved their record to 5–2 by beating the Irish 26–13. Conversely, the Irish loss made their team the losingest Notre Dame team of all-time. The Panthers started a 10 play, 72-yard scoring drive late in the first period, and finished it in the second quarter on an 11-yard scramble by quarterback Corny Salvaterra. Ambrose Bagamery missed the point after. Later in the quarter, Pitt marched 87 yards in 11 plays with Joe Walton catching a 9-yard pass from Corny Salvaterra for their second touchdown. Darrell Lewis added the extra point to give Pitt a 13–0 lead with 46 seconds left in the half. Two consecutive Pitt kick-offs went out of bounds. So Notre Dame started on the 50-yard line. On second down, Paul Hornung dropped back to pass, but instead he scrambled 50-yards for the Irish score. Then he missed the extra point, and Pitt led at halftime 13–6. Late in the third period Pitt started a 91-yard touchdown drive that ended early in the final quarter on a 5-yard run by Jim Theodore. Ambrose Bagamery kicked the extra point, and Pitt was ahead 20–6. With less than 4 minutes to play, Bagamery caught a swing pass from Salvaterra and raced 44 yards for the Panthers final touchdown. Bagamery missed the extra point. On the kick-off, Notre Dame halfback Robert Ward fumbled, recovered and raced 84 yards for the final touchdown of the game. Hornung booted the placement to finalize the scoring 26–13.

The Panthers dominated statistically. Pitt earned 19 first downs to 9 for the Irish. Pitt gained 407 total yards to 172 yards. Ambrose Bagamery gained 96 yards on 6 carries and Ralph Jelic had 60 yards on 9 carries to lead the Panthers. This was the first Pitt victory over Notre Dame at home since 1937.

The Pitt starting lineup for the game against Notre Dame was Joe Walton (left end), Bob Pollock (left tackle), Vince Scorsone (left guard), Charles Brueckman (center), Dan Wisniewski (right guard), Herman Canil (right tackle), Bob Rosborough (right end), Corny Salvaterra (quarterback), Ambrose Bagamery (left halfback), Jim Theodore(right halfback) and Ralph Jelic (fullback). Substitutes appearing in the game for Pitt were Jim Zanos, Wally Walinchus, Ron Kissel, Bob Kiesel, Art Gob, Joe Pullekines, Ed Michaels, Jim McCusker, Ed Humeston, Don Crfafton, Tom Salwoki, Jim Sabatini, Dick Carr, Dick Scherer, Dale Brown, Darrell Lewis, Bill Kaliden, Ray DiPasquale, Corky Cost, Dick Haley, Tom Jenkins and Bob Stark.

=== Army ===
Week 8: Army at Pitt

Team	1	2	3	4	Total
Army	0	6	0	7	13
• Pitt	0	13	0	13	26

- Date: November 17, 1956
- Location: Pitt Stadium
  Pittsburgh, PA
- Game start: 1:30 p.m.
- Game attendance: 55,639
- Game weather: crisp sunshine
- Referee: John Coles (Westminster)

Scoring summary
2	ARMY	Bob Kyasky 14-yard run (Dick Murtland kick)	ARMY 7–0
2	PITT	Corny Salvaterra 2-yard run (kick missed)	ARMY 7–6
3	PITT	Dick Bowen 9-yard run (Darrell Lewis kick)	PITT 13–6
4	PITT	Dick Scherer 7-yard pass from Corny Salvaterra (Ambrose Bagamery kick)	PITT 20–7

On November 17, the Panthers Homecoming opponent was the Army Cadets. Earl Blaik's squad was 5–2 on the season. Pitt led the all-time series 4–1. 1,350 cadets paraded into the stadium as part of the pregame ceremonies.

Coach Michelosen named tackle Herman Canil and halfback Ray Pasquale co-captains for the game. Jim McCusker started at left tackle in place of Bob Pollock, who reinjured his leg during practice.

The Homecoming crowd, 55,639 strong, was treated to a Panthers victory over the Black Knights 20–7. After a scoreless first quarter, the Cadets benefited from a poor punt to gain possession on the Panthers 29-yard line. On the second play, Army back Bob Kyasky ran inside left tackle for 14 yards and six points. Dick Murtland converted the extra point and Army led 7–0. With under five minutes to go in the first half, Pitt recovered a fumble on the Army 14-yard line. On first down quarterback Corny Salvaterra dropped back to pass, but saw an opening and raced into the end zone. Dick Haley's placement was low and wide. The #16-ranked Panthers held Army scoreless the rest of the game, and scored a touchdown in both the third and fourth quarter to seal the victory. A 10-play, 47-yard drive ended with Dick Bowen going 9 yards around right end. Darrell Lewis' kick put the Panthers ahead 13–7. In the final period, Salvaterra engineered a 50-yard drive capped with a 7-yard touchdown pass to Dick Scherer. Ambrose Bagamery's placement ended the scoring.

Corny Salvaterra led the Panthers with 138 yards rushing and a touchdown on 13 carries. He completed 4 of 14 passes for 36 yards and a touchdown.

The Pitt starting lineup for the game against Army was Joe Walton (left end), Jim McCusker (left tackle), Vince Scorsone (left guard), Charles Brueckman (center), Dan Wisniewski (right guard), Herman Canil (right tackle), Bob Rosborough (right end), Corny Salvaterra (quarterback), Corky Cost (left halfback), Jim Theodore(right halfback) and Ralph Jelic (fullback). Substitutes appearing in the game for Pitt were Art Gob, Joe Pullekines, Ed Michaels, Bob Pollock, Tom Salwoki, Dick Carr, Dick Scherer, Dale Brown, Darrell Lewis, Ambrose Bagamery, Dick Bowen, Ray DiPasquale, Nick Passodelis, Dick Haley, Tom Jenkins and Bob Stark.

=== Penn State ===
Week 9: Penn State at Pitt

Team	1	2	3	4	Total
Penn State	0	7	0	0	7
Pitt	0	7	0	0	7

- Date: November 24, 1956
- Location: Pitt Stadium
  Pittsburgh, PA
- Game start: 1:30 p.m.
- Game attendance: 51,123
- Game weather: freezing cold
- Referee: L. J. Kelly (Dartmouth)

Scoring summary
2	PSU	Billy Kane 4-yard run( Milt Plum kick)	PSU 7–0
2	PITT	Bob Rosborough 18-yard pass from Corny Salvaterra (Ambrose Bagamery kick)	TIED 7–7

On November 24, the Panthers played Penn State for the fifty-sixth time. Pitt led the all-time series 31–22–2. The teams had identical 6–2 records, but Pitt was ranked #14 and favored by 6 points. Pitt halfback Corky Cost had his appendix removed and could not play, but Dick Bowen returned to the starting lineup. This game was designated “Parents Day.” The dads were able to sit on a bench behind the squad wearing their son's number on their back. The Panthers were playing for Old Ironsides, the Lambert Trophy and a bowl bid.

51,123 fans braved 28-degree temperatures to watch the Panthers and Nittany Lions play to a 7–7 tie. Pitt took the opening kick-off and drove to the Lions 1-foot line, where they surrendered the ball on downs. All the scoring took place in the second quarter. State gained possession on their 40-yard line, and dove the 60-yards in 11 plays. Halfback Billy Kane ran 4 yards through tackle for the touchdown. Milt Plum kicked the extra point. Pitt answered with a 10-play, 75-yard drive of its own. Corny Salvaterra threw an 18-yard touchdown pass to Bob Rosborough for the score, and Ambrose Bagamery tied the game with his placement. A defensive battle ensued. Penn State came close to winning the game in the final quarter, but Plum missed a 13-yard field goal try. Comparing quarterbacks: Plum completed 9 of 15 passes for 108 yards, while Salvaterra gained 96 yards rushing on 12 carries.

By virtue of the tie game, Syracuse won the Lambert Trophy. Pitt retained Old Ironsides because they tied with Penn State, and had possession from last year. And on November 30, Pitt accepted an invitation to play in the Gator Bowl on December 29, at Jacksonville, FL. Their opponent was going to be either Mississippi or Georgia Tech.

The Pitt starting lineup for the game against Penn State was Joe Walton (left end), Bob Pollock (left tackle), Vince Scorsone (left guard), Charles Brueckman (center), Dan Wisniewski (right guard), Herman Canil (right tackle), Bob Rosborough (right end), Corny Salvaterra (quarterback), Dick Bowen (left halfback), Jim Theodore(right halfback) and Ralph Jelic (fullback). Substitutes appearing in the game for Pitt were Ed Michaels, Jim McCusker, Ron Kissel, Tom Salwoki, Dick Carr, Dick Scherer, Dale Brown, Darrell Lewis, Ambrose Bagamery, Ray DiPasquale, Nick Passodelis, Dick Haley and Tom Jenkins.

=== at Miami (FL) ===
Week 10: Pitt at Miami

Team	1	2	3	4	Total
• Pitt	0	0	7	7	14
Miami	0	7	0	0	7

- Date: December 8, 1956
- Location: Burdine Stadium
  Miami, FL
- Game start: 1:30 p.m.
- Game attendance: 38,243
- Game weather: hot
- Referee: Charles Bowen (Georgia Tech)

Scoring summary
2	MIAMI	Sam Scarnecchia 1-yard sneak (Ed Oliver kick)	MIAMI 7–0
3	PITT	Joe Walton 5-yard pass from Corny Salvaterra (Ambrose Bagamery kick)	TIED 7–7
4	PITT	Darrell Lewis 1-yard sneak (Ambrose Bagamery kick)	PITT 14–7

On December 8, the Panthers took their final road trip of the regular season to Miami, FL to face Andy Gustafson's #6 ranked and unbeaten Miami Hurricanes. They had a 14 game unbeaten streak, their only blemish being a 7–7 tie with Georgia. Miami led the all-time series 2–1. Miami won both games at Pitt (1950, 1955), and Pitt won at Miami (1951). Fullback Don Bosseler earned All-American honors. This Homecoming game was the NBC Game of the Week, and first national broadcast from Miami. Lindsey Nelson and Red Grange handled the announcing.

The Gator Bowl bound Panthers spoiled the Hurricanes Homecoming with a 14–7 upset. Miami got on the scoreboard first with a 1-yard quarterback sneak by Sam Scarnecchia late in the second quarter to end a 76-yard drive. Ed Oliver kicked the extra point and Miami led 7–0 at halftime. Pitt tied the score on their first possession of the second half. A 59-yard drive was capped by Corny Salvaterra's sneak from the 1-yard line. Ambrose Bagamery's placement was good. The go-ahead 8-play, 63-yard touchdown drive began with less than 7 minutes remaining in the fourth quarter. The highlight was a 46-yard scamper by Tom Jenkins to the 3-yard line. Darrell Lewis scored on a 1-yard keeper and Bagamery added the placement for the final score.

The Pitt starting lineup for the game against Miami was Joe Walton (left end), Bob Pollock (left tackle), Vince Scorsone (left guard), Charles Brueckman (center), Dan Wisniewski (right guard), Herman Canil (right tackle), Bob Rosborough (right end), Corny Salvaterra (quarterback), Dick Bowen (left halfback), Jim Theodore(right halfback) and Ralph Jelic (fullback). Substitutes appearing in the game for Pitt were Ed Michaels, Jim McCusker, Ron Kissel, Tom Salwoki, Dick Carr, Dick Scherer, Dale Brown, Darrell Lewis, Ambrose Bagamery, Ray DiPasquale, Nick Passodelis, Dick Haley and Tom Jenkins.

=== Gator Bowl: Georgia Tech ===
Gator Bowl: Pittsburgh vs. Georgia Tech

Team	1	2	3	4	Total
Pittsburgh (7–2–1)	0	7	7	0	14
• Georgia Tech (8–1–1)	7	7	7	0	21

- Date: December 29, 1956
- Location: Gator Bowl Stadium
  Jacksonville, FL
- Game start: 2:00 p.m.
- Game attendance: 37, 683
- Game weather: windy and chilly
- Referee: John Coles

Scoring summary
1	TECH	Ken Owen 3-yard run (Wade Mitchell kick)	TECH 7–0
2	TECH	Jerry Nabors 6-yard pass from George Volkert (Mitchell kick)	TECH 14–0
2	PITT	Dick Bowen 42-yard pass from Corny Salvaterra (Joe Walton pass from Salvaterra)	TECH 14–7
3	TECH	Paul Rotenberry 5-yard run (Mitchell kick)	TECH 21–7
3	PITT	Salvaterra 1-yard sneak (Ambrose Bagamery kick)	TECH 21–14

The 1956 Gator Bowl was a rematch of the 1956 Sugar Bowl – Pitt versus Georgia Tech. Georgia Tech was favored by a touchdown, and had won 7 Bowl games in a row under Coach Dodd. Bobby Dodd's Yellow Jackets were 9–1 on the season, losing only to Tennessee.

On Wednesday December 26, the 42-man Panthers contingent flew on a chartered Pan-American flight into Jacksonville, and bussed 20 miles to Ponte Vedra Beach to headquarter at the Innlet Hotel. A daily 2:30 practice was held at the Fletcher High Field. On Friday, another plane brought the wives and cheerleaders. The band did not make the trip, as the CBS contract outlined the halftime show for the Bowl officials to follow, and the school bands were shut out.

37,683 fans watched the Panthers fail in their quest for revenge, as the Yellow Jackets won their eighth straight bowl game for Coach Dodd 21–14. Georgia Tech scored the first two touchdowns. In the first period, on the fourth play of the game, Tech defensive back Paul Rotenberry intercepted a Corny Salvaterra pass and ran 23 yards to the Panthers 29-yard line. Tech scored in 9 plays on a Ken Owen 3-yard run through tackle. Wade Mitchell kicked the extra point. Pitt answered with a 94-yard drive that ended with the Tech defense tackling Salvaterra on the 1-yard line on fourth down. Tech scored again in the second quarter on a 10-play, 70-yard drive. A George Volkert 6-yard pass to Jerry Nabors and Michell placement made it 14–0 Tech with less than 2 minutes left in the first half. Pitt finally answered with a 5-play, 64-yard drive. Salvaterra's 42-yard pass to Dick Bowen put Pitt on the scoreboard, and Salvaterra passed to Joe Walton for the extra point. Tech widened the lead back to 14 in the third quarter. Pitt fumbled the kick-off and Tech recovered on the Panthers 37-yard line. Rotenberry scored on a 5-yard dash around left end. Mitchell converted for a 21–7 lead. Pitt answered with a 70-yard scoring drive. Salvaterra's quarterback sneak from the 1-yard line and Bagamery's placement cut the lead to 21–14. Pitt drove into Georgia Tech territory three times in the fourth quarter, but could not score.

The Pitt starting lineup for the game against Georgia Tech was Joe Walton (left end), Bob Pollock (left tackle), Vince Scorsone (left guard), Charles Breuckman (center), Dan Wisnewski (right guard), Herman Canil (right tackle), Bob Rosborough (right end), Corny Salvaterra (quarterback), Jim Theodore (left halfback), Dick Bowen (right halfback) and Ralph Jelic (fullback). Substitutes appearing in the game for Pitt were Dick Scherer, Dale brown, Ron Kissel, Jim McCusker, Ed Michaels, Dick Carr, Tom Salwoki, Darrell Lewis, Ambrose Bagamery, Dick Haley, Ray DiPasquale, Nick Passodelis and Tom Jenkins.

== Postseason ==
The Panthers finished the season ranked #13 in the Associated Press football poll.

Joe Walton was named consensus All-American.

== Personnel ==
=== Coaching staff ===
1956 Pittsburgh Panthers football staff
Coaching staff: John Michelosen – head coach; Jack Wiley – head line coach; Victor Fusia – backfield coach; Robert Timmons – end coach; Ernie Hefferle – offensive line coach; Steve Petro – freshman coach; Walter Cummins– assistant freshman coach	Support staff: Thomas J. Hamilton – athletic director; Walter P. Cummins – assistant athletic director; Beano Cook– athletic publicity director; Frank Carver – graduate manager; Howard Waite – trainer; Roger McGill – assistant trainer; Edward Schultz – student manager

=== Roster ===
1956 Pittsburgh Panthers football roster
Player	Position	Games	Weight	Height	Class	Prep School	Hometown
Bill Amos	quarterback	0	202	6 ft	senior	Washington H. S./Univ. of Maryland	Washington, PA
Ambrose Bagamery*	halfback	11	193	6 ft	senior	Zelienople H. S.	Zelienople, PA
Frank Benke	guard	0	200	5 ft 11 in	junior	West Deer H. S.	West Deer, PA
Fred Benzing	end	0	195	6 ft 3 in	sophomore	Baldwin H. S.	Baldwin, PA
Dick Bowen*	halfback	7	200	6 ft	junior	Duquesne H. S.	Duquesne, PA
Dale Brown*	end	11	201	6 ft	senior	Lincoln H. S.	Elwood City, PA
Charles Brueckman*	center	11	203	6 ft 2 in	junior	Stowe Township H. S.	McKees Rocks, PA
Herman Canil*	tackle	11	220	6 ft 1 in	senior	Vandergrift H. S.	Vandergrift, PA
Dick Carr*	guard	9	204	6 ft	junior	Stonewall Jackson H. S.	Charleston, WV
Ralph Ciper	fullback	0	194	5 ft 10 in	junior	Ambridge H. S.	Ambridge, PA
Charles Cost*	halfback	8	170	5 ft 10 in	senior	Wilkinsburg H. S.	Wilkinsburg, PA
Don Crafton	guard	2	191	6 ft	junior	Donora H. S.	Donora, PA
Ray DiPasquale*	halfback	11	174	5 ft 10 in	senior	Central Catholic H. S.	Pittsburgh, PA
John Flara	halfback	2	173	5 ft 10 in	sophomore	Midland H. S.	Midland, PA
Art Gob	end	3	225	6 ft 4 in	sophomore	Baldwin H. S.	Baldwin, PA
John Guzik	guard	1	215	6 ft 3 in	junior	Cecil Twp. H. S.	Cecil Twp., PA
Robert Gwynn	tackle	0	208	5 ft 11 in	sophomore	Waynesburg H. S.	Waynesburg, PA
Dick Haley*	halfback	9	184	5 ft 10 in	sophomore	Midway H. S.	Midway, PA
William Hill	end	0	190	6 ft	sophomore	Clairton H. S.	Clairton, PA
Bob Hook	end	0	171	5 ft 11 in	sophomore	Brookfield H. S.	Brookfield, OH
Ed Humeston	center	2	195	6 ft 2 in	junior	Clarksburg H. S.	Clarksburg, WV
Ralph Jelic*	fullback	11	183	6 ft	senior	South Hills H. S.	Pittsburgh, PA
Tom Jenkins*	fullback	9	192	6 ft	senior	East Liverpool H. S.	East Liverpool, OH
Bill Kaliden	quarterback	5	179	6 ft	sophomore	Homestead H. S.	Homestead, PA
Bob Kiesel	end	5	204	6 ft	senior	Scranton Central H. S.	Scranton, PA
Ronnie Kissel*	tackle	11	229	6 ft 2 in	junior	McKeesport Technical H. S.	McKeesport, PA
Jim Lenhart	quarterback	0	200	6 ft 2 in	senior	Charleroi H. S.	Fairmont, WV
Darrell Lewis*	quarterback	10	186	5 ft 10 in	senior	Wilkinsburg H. S	Wilkinsburg, PA
Bill Linder	tackle	0	201	6 ft 2 in	sophomore	Central Catholic H.S.	Pittsburgh, PA
Jim McCusker*	tackle	11	245	6 ft 2 in	junior	Jamestown H. S.	Jamestown, NY
Ed Michaels*	guard	10	196	5 ft 11 in	sophomore	Southside H. S.	Elmira, NY
Ken Montanari	center	0	200	6 ft 1 in	sophomore	Plum H. S.	Plum, PA
Gordon Oliver	end	0	186	6 ft	junior	Punxsutawney H. S.	Punxsutawney, PA
Nick Passodelis*	halfback	9	180	5 ft 11 in	senior	Aliquippa H. S.	Aliquippa, PA
Bob Pollock*	tackle	10	223	6 ft 2 in	senior	Mt. Carmel H. S.	Mt. Carmel, PA
Peter Prince	quarterback	0	182	5 ft 10 in	sophomore	Nashua H. S.	Nashua, NH
Joe Pullekines	tackle	3	207	6 ft 2 in	sophomore	St. James H. S.	Woodlyn, PA
Fred Riddle	fullback	0	193	6 ft	sophomore	Robinson Twp. H. S.	Crafton, PA
Tom Romanik	tackle	0	213	5 ft 10 in	sophomore	St. Vincent H. S.	Pittsburgh, PA
Bob Rosborough*	end	11	206	6 ft 1 in	senior	Donora H. S.	Donora, PA
James Sabatini	center	2	192	6 ft 1 in	junior	Wilkes-Barre H. S.	Plains, PA
Cornelius Salvaterra*	quarterback	11	198	6 ft	junior	GAR Memorial H. S.	Wilkes-Barre, PA
Tom Salwoki*	center	11	212	6 ft 2 in	sophomore	New Britain H. S.	New Britain, CT
Dick Scherer*	end	11	205	6 ft 1 in	junior	North Catholic H. S.	Pittsburgh, PA
Joe Scisly	halfback	0	185	6 ft	sophomore	Danville H. S.	Elysburg, PA
Vince Scorsone*	guard	11	214	6 ft	senior	McKeesport Technical H. S.	McKeesport, PA
Richard Staber	tackle	0	206	6 ft 2 in	sophomore	West Hazleton H. S.	Conyngham, PA
Bob Stark	fullback	4	190	5 ft 11 in	sophomore	East McKeesport H. S.	McKeesport, PA
Henry Suffoletta	guard	0	204	5 ft 11 in	sophomore	Midland H. S.	Midland, PA
Jim Theodore*	halfback	11	179	5 ft 10 in	junior	Westinghouse Memorial H. S.	Wilmerding, PA
Eugene Uhlman	center	0	203	6 ft	junior	Charleroi H. S.	Charleroi, PA
Bill Walinchus	tackle	1	209	6 ft 1 in	sophomore	Mahanoy City H.S.	Mahanoy City, PA
Joe Walton*	end	11	201	5 ft 11 in	senior	Beaver Falls H. S.	Beaver Falls, PA
William Welsh	end	0	185	6 ft	junior	Worcester Academy	Worcester, MA
Dan Wisniewski*	guard	11	212	6 ft	junior	Erie East H. S.	Erie, PA
Jim Zanos	end	4	194	5 ft 11 in	sophomore	Munhall H.S.	Munhall, PA
Bill Zito	tackle	0	200	6 ft	junior	Punxsutawney H. S.	Punxsutawney, PA
* Letterman

== Individual scoring summary ==
1956 Pittsburgh Panthers scoring summary
Player	Touchdowns	Extra points	Field goals	Safety	Points
Joe Walton	6	1	0	0	37
Corny Salvaterra	6	1	0	0	37
Ambrose Bagamery	1	12	0	0	18
Jim Theodore	2	0	0	0	12
Ray DiPasquale	2	0	0	0	12
Dick Bowen	2	0	0	0	12
Darrell Lewis	1	4	0	0	10
Nick Passodelis	1	0	0	0	6
Dick Scherer	1	0	0	0	6
Bob Rosborough	1	0	0	0	6
Totals	23	18	0	0	156

== Team players drafted into the NFL ==
The following players were selected in the 1957 NFL draft.

Player	Position	Round	Pick	NFL club
Joe Walton	End	2	21	Washington Redskins
Vince Scorsone	Guard	4	45	Washington Redskins
Charlie Brueckman	Linebacker	9	104	San Francisco 49ers
Ralph Jelic	Back	10	113	Pittsburgh Steelers
Herman Canil	Tackle	15	174	Pittsburgh Steelers
Dan Wisniewski	Guard	17	198	Baltimore Colts
Corny Salvaterra	Quarterback	17	199	Pittsburgh Steelers
Bob Pollock	Tackle	23	271	Pittsburgh Steelers
