= 1956 Army Cadets football team =

American college football season

1956 Army Cadets football

Lambert-Meadowlands Trophy
- Conference: Independent
- Record: 5–3–1
- Head coach: Earl Blaik (16th season)
- Captain: Ed Szvetecz

1956 Eastern major college football independents records
	Conf.			Overall
Team	W	L	T	W		L		T
No. 8 Syracuse		–		7	–	2	–	0
Penn State		–		6	–	2	–	1
No. 13 Pittsburgh		–		7	–	3	–	1
Army		–		5	–	3	–	1
Holy Cross		–		5	–	3	–	1
Villanova		–		5	–	4	–	0
Boston College		–		5	–	4	–	0
Colgate		–		4	–	5	–	0
Boston University		–		1	–	5	–	2
Rankings from AP poll

The 1956 Army Cadets football team represented the United States Military Academy as an independent during the 1956 college football season. In their 16th year under head coach Earl Blaik, the Cadets compiled a 5–3–1 record and outscored all opponents by a combined total of 223 to 153. In the annual Army–Navy Game, the Cadets tied the Midshipmen by a 7 to 7 score. The Cadets also lost to Michigan, Syracuse, and Pittsburgh.

Army guard Stan Slater was honored by the United Press as a third-team player on the 1956 College Football All-America Team.

== Schedule ==
Date	Time	Opponent	Rank	Site	TV	Result	Attendance	Source
September 29		VMI	No. 16	Michie Stadium; West Point, NY		W 32–12	26,150	
October 6		Penn State	No. 15	Michie Stadium; West Point, NY		W 14–7	24,175–24,195	
October 13		at Michigan	No. 15	Michigan Stadium; Ann Arbor, MI		L 14–48	93,101–93,402	
October 20		at Syracuse		Archbold Stadium; Syracuse, NY		L 0–7	40,053	
October 27		at Columbia		Baker Field; New York, NY		W 60–0	20,000	
November 3		Colgate		Michie Stadium; West Point, NY		W 55–46	27,400–28,000	
November 10		William & Mary		Michie Stadium; West Point, NY		W 34–6	16,835	
November 17		at Pittsburgh		Pitt Stadium; Pittsburgh, PA		L 7–20	55,639	
December 1	1:15 p.m.	vs. No. 13 Navy		Philadelphia Municipal Stadium; Philadelphia, PA (Army–Navy Game)	NBC	T 7–7	102,000	
Rankings from AP Poll released prior to the game; All times are in Eastern time

== Roster ==
1956 Army Cadets football team roster
Players
Coaches
Offense

Pos.	#	Name	Class
HB		Pete Dawkins	So
G		Stan Slater

Defense

Pos.	#	Name	Class

Special teams

Pos.	#	Name	Class

Head coach

- Earl Blaik

Coordinators/assistant coaches

Legend

- (C) Team captain
- (S) Suspended
- (I) Ineligible
- Injured
- Redshirt
