= Charlie Caldwell =

American athlete and coach (1901–1957)

Biographical details
- Born: August 2, 1901; Bristol, Virginia, U.S.
- Died: November 1, 1957 (aged 56); Princeton, New Jersey, U.S.

Playing career

Football
- 1922–1924: Princeton

Baseball
- 1925: New York Yankees
- Positions: Back, center (football); Guard (basketball); Pitcher, outfielder (baseball)

Coaching career (HC unless noted)

Football
- 1925–1927: Princeton (assistant)
- 1928–1944: Williams
- 1945–1956: Princeton

Basketball
- 1929–1940: Williams

Baseball
- 1931–1944: Williams
- 1945–1946: Princeton

Head coaching record
- Overall: 146–67–9 (football); 78–66 (basketball); 118–96 (baseball)

Accomplishments and honors

Awards
- AFCA Coach of the Year (1950)
- College Football Hall of Fame; Inducted in 1961 (profile)

Charles William Caldwell (August 2, 1901 – November 1, 1957) was an American football, basketball, and baseball player and coach. He served as the head football coach at Williams College for 15 seasons between 1928 and 1944 and at Princeton University from 1945 to 1956, compiling a career college football record of 146–67–9. Caldwell was also the head basketball coach at Williams for ten seasons (1929–1939), tallying a mark of 78–66, and the head baseball coach at Williams (1931–1944) and Princeton (1945–1946), achieving a career college baseball record of 118–96. He was inducted into the College Football Hall of Fame as a coach in 1961.

== Early life and playing career ==
Caldwell was born in Bristol, Virginia on August 2, 1901. He attended Princeton University, where he played football, basketball, and baseball. He played in the Major League Baseball as a pitcher for the New York Yankees in 1925. In three career games, he had a 0–0 record, with a 16.88 ERA. He batted and threw right-handed.

== Coaching career ==
Caldwell coached three sports at Williams College. His record there was 76–37–6 in football, 78–66 in basketball, and 100–74 in baseball. Caldwell died in Princeton, New Jersey on November 1, 1957.

== Head coaching record ==
=== Football ===
Year	Team	Overall	Conference	Standing	Bowl/playoffs	Coaches^{#}	AP^{°}
Williams Ephs (Independent) (1928–1942)
1928	Williams	7–1					
1929	Williams	6–1–1					
1930	Williams	6–1–1					
1931	Williams	6–1–1					
1932	Williams	1–7					
1933	Williams	3–4					
1934	Williams	4–4					
1935	Williams	7–1					
1936	Williams	5–3					
1937	Williams	6–2					
1938	Williams	3–4–1					
1939	Williams	2–5–1					
1940	Williams	6–1–1					
1941	Williams	7–1					
1942	Williams	7–1					
Williams:		76–37–6					
Princeton Tigers (Independent) (1945–1955)
1945	Princeton	2–3–2					
1946	Princeton	3–5					
1947	Princeton	5–3					
1948	Princeton	4–4					
1949	Princeton	6–3					18
1950	Princeton	9–0				8	6
1951	Princeton	9–0				6	6
1952	Princeton	8–1				14	19
1953	Princeton	5–4					
1954	Princeton	5–3–1					
1955	Princeton	7–2					
Princeton Tigers (Ivy League) (1956)
1956	Princeton	7–2	5–2	2nd			
Princeton:		70–30–3	5–2				
Total:		146–67–9					
^{#}Rankings from final Coaches Poll.; ^{°}Rankings from final AP Poll.
