= Gus Zitrides =

American football player and coach (1915–1987)

Biographical details
- Born: April 4, 1915; Manchester, New Hampshire, U.S.
- Died: January 27, 1987 (aged 71); Langhorne, Pennsylvania, U.S.

Playing career
- 1936–1938: Dartmouth
- Position: Guard

Coaching career (HC unless noted)
- 1939–1941: Cornell (assistant)
- 1947–1949: Brown (line)
- 1950: Brown

Head coaching record
- Overall: 1–8

Accomplishments and honors

Awards
- Third-team All-American (1937); First-team All-Eastern (1937)

Gregory George "Gus" Zitrides (April 4, 1915 – January 27, 1987) was an American college football player and coach. He served as the head football coach at Brown University for one season, in 1950, compiling a record of 1–8. Zitrides also spent time as an assistant coach at Brown and Cornell University. He played as a guard at Dartmouth under Earl Blaik from 1936 to 1938.

== Early life ==
Born to a family of Greek descent, Zitrides attended Central High School in Manchester, New Hampshire, where he played high school football from 1932 to 1935. Zitrides then attended Dartmouth College, where he played for the football team as a guard from 1936 to 1938 under head coach Earl Blaik.

== Coaching career and military service ==
Zitrides then served for three years as an assistant coach at Cornell University. In 1942, Zitrides resigned his position to enter the United States Navy and earn a reserve commission through the V-5 program, which ran physical fitness programs around the country to train Navy pilots.

After the War, Zitrides returned to his alma mater as a line coach in 1947 under head coach Rip Engle. Before the 1950 season, Engle left to take over at Penn State, and he offered to bring along his assistants, Zitrides and Bill Doolittle. Zitrides declined the offer because Brown University offered him the head coaching position. Doolittle elected to remain at Brown as Zitrides's assistant. Zitrides was relieved after recording only one win to eight losses in his first season.

== Later life ==
After his coaching career, Zitrides entered government service in 1951, in which he worked until his retirement in 1973. He died in Langhorne, Pennsylvania, on January 27, 1987, at the age of 71. Manchester Central High School inducted him into its hall of fame in 1996.

== Head coaching record ==
Year	Team	Overall	Conference	Standing	Bowl/playoffs
Brown Bears (Independent) (1950)
1950	Brown	1–8			
Brown:		1–8			
Total:		1–8			
