= George K. James =

American football and baseball coach (1905–1994)

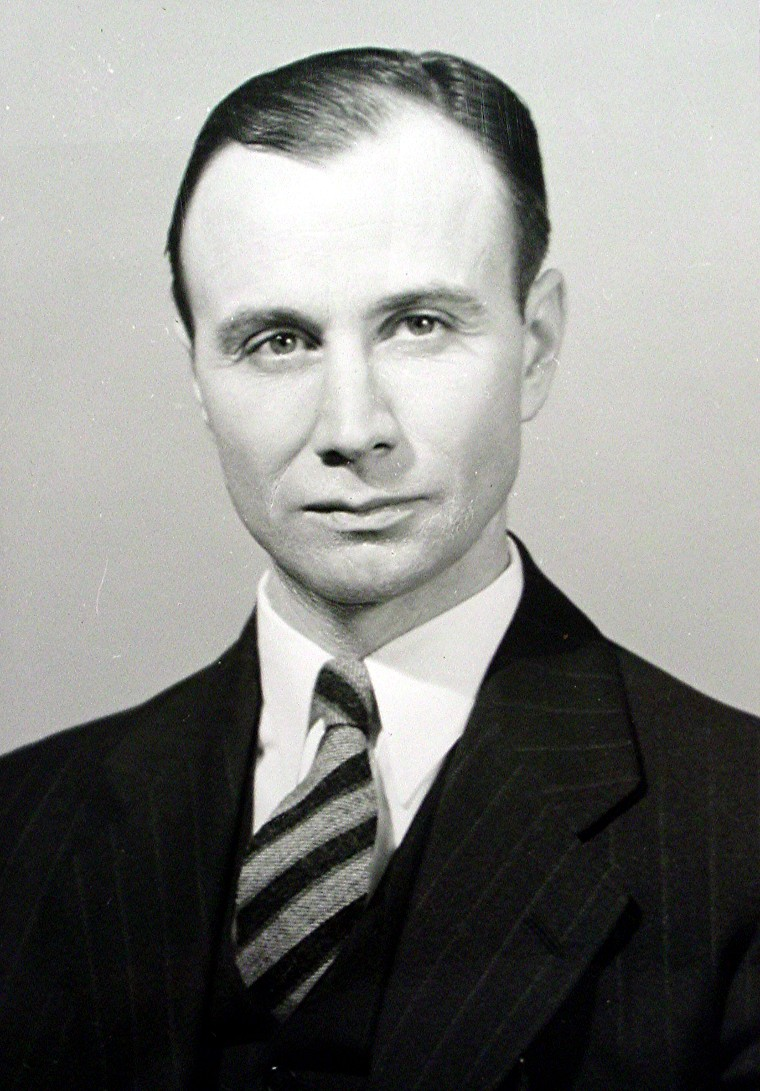

Biographical details
- Born: April 12, 1905; Lower Allen, Pennsylvania, U.S.
- Died: January 9, 1994 (aged 88); Sarasota, Florida, U.S.

Playing career

Football
- 1927–1929: Bucknell

Baseball
- c. 1929: Bucknell

Coaching career (HC unless noted)

Football
- 1934–1935: North Carolina (assistant)
- 1936–1946: Cornell (assistant)
- 1947–1960: Cornell

Baseball
- 1943–1945: Cornell

Head coaching record
- Overall: 66–58–2 (football); 11–22 (baseball)

George Kepford "Lefty" James (April 12, 1905 – January 9, 1994) was an American football and baseball coach. He served as the head football coach at Cornell University from 1947 to 1960. Four of his teams won unofficial Ivy League titles and he ran Cornell's physical training program during World War II.

== Early life ==
James was the son of Charles H. James and his spouse, Bertie. The James lived in the Lower Allen Township, Pennsylvania during Lefty's childhood. Charles and the older children worked as laborers in town's woolen mills, the year after Lefty graduated from Bucknell College in 1929. He attended secondary school at Bellefonte Academy.

== Athletics ==
James was a three-year varsity football player at Bucknell University, graduating in 1930. During his first season in 1927, Bucknell's football team went 6–3–1. It was also the first team coached by Cornell's future head coach, Carl Snavely, who later employed James. James was also a Bucknell Bison baseball player, captaining the Diamondmen in his senior year.

== Coaching career ==
Graduating during the Great Depression, James started as a high school coach in Northeast and Central Pennsylvania, including Canton and Jersey Shore. From 1930 to 1934, James also played semiprofessional baseball and umpired in baseball leagues in Pennsylvania. James was schooled by Snavely in the single-wing system while the latter coached him at Bellefonte Academy and Bucknell. He rejoined Snavely in 1934 as assistant football coach at the University of North Carolina at Chapel Hill. He followed Snavely to Cornell in the spring of 1936. Snavely assigned James as chief scout and backfield coach in the mid-1930s. He also assisted in basketball, served as head baseball coach, and directed the university's physical education program. James became the Big Red's head football coach in 1947, succeeding Edward McKeever. His agenda upon taking over the Cornell squad was to use Snavely's single-wing formation in tandem with the T formation introduced at Cornell by McKeever, all in order to capitalize on the Ivy League player's unique attributes, which supported a lighter, faster, thinking man's games.

The second year that Lefty James’ coached the Cornell team, the Big Red lost only to the United States Military Academy at West Point, New York. This was done working with injuries and nascent, but undeveloped talent. His freshman season as an Ivy League coach followed Cornell finishing last in the Ivies during the 1947 Season with the team inherited from Ed McKeever. By the close of the 1948 season, Cornell was first in the Ivies, defeated Penn for the first time since 1939, closed the season 8–1. The team had many injured, and was composed mostly of sophomores.

James held the head coach post until 1960, winning unofficial Ivy League titles in 1948, 1949, and 1953, and tying with Yale for the league crown in 1954. In the mid-1950s, he oversaw the transition of Cornell into the official Ivy League. James’ philosophy of coaching included the tenet that “[a]ny boy that wants to play football at Cornell will get a chance.” As “dean of the Ivy League” coaches, Lefty James overcame his natural shyness to represent national collegiate football on television, such as the appearance he made on The Ed Sullivan Show on December 1, 1957. James appeared at the announcement of the Collier's All American Football Team, sponsored by General Mills. Buddy Holly and the Crickets were the musical act for the episode.

== The firing of James ==
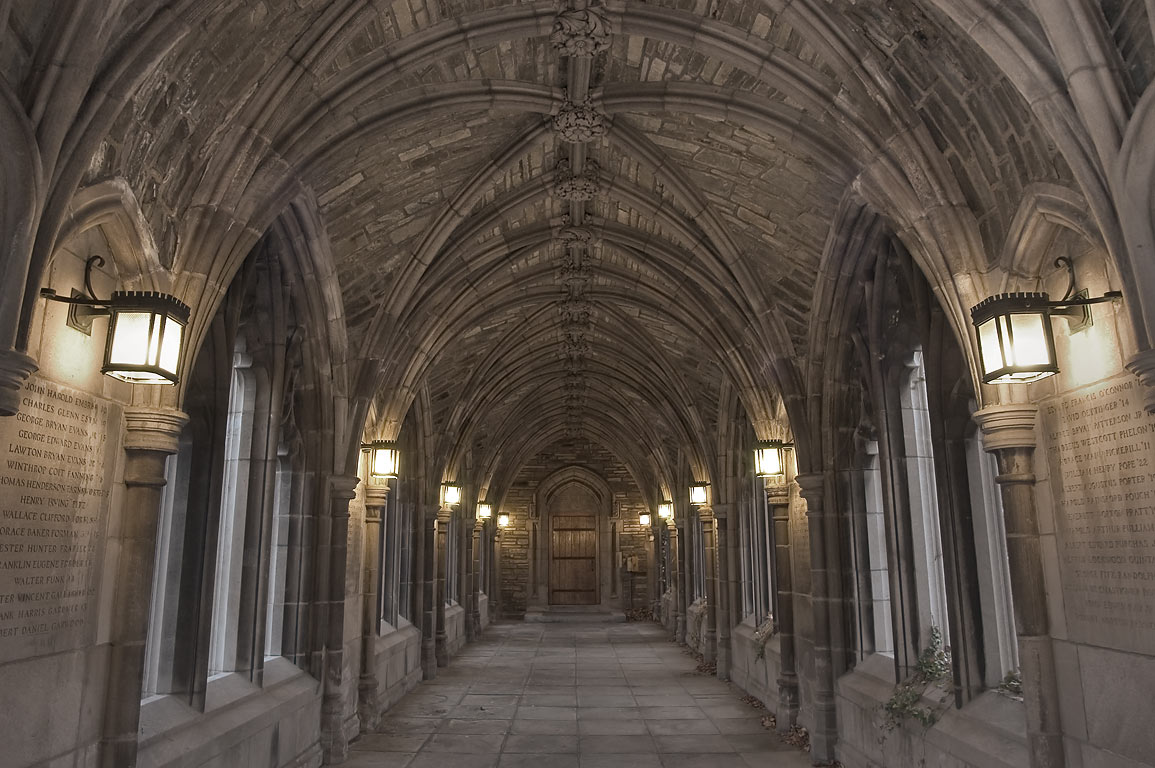
Cornell University's War Memorial

Compared to his predecessor, McKeever, James was soft-spoken and avoided bluster and pep talks. He was more methodological in his coaching, which was informed by his role as a professor of physical education. James approached coaching as an act of ‘teaching’. James' teams were initially quite successful, but Cornell's fortunes had declined by the late 1950s to the point where the school decided to fire him after the 1960 season. At the time of his dismissal, James was the longest-tenured coach in the Ivy League. He was called "the Dean of Ivy League coaches" by the sports press.

When finally able to speak publicly on the termination, James' said, “[a]lthough not an alumnus of Cornell, I have been a representative of this great university for twenty-five years and have always had her best interests at heart, it appears it is to the university's best interest that I resign." Following James’ termination, Ivy League sports watchers considered the firing evidence that Cornell was trying to shake-off the Ivy League's recent endorsement of amateur athletics and transition to “big-time” football.

James' firing was not handled well. Believing a resignation could be covered by a volunteer resignation, Athletic Director Robert Kane adopted opacity over transparency. The result was a university employee left to work through the termination, alone and in silence. As James’ said after the university announcement, “It hit me like a bombshell, I just didn’t expect it. I really don’t know what I’ll do. I am confused by the whole thing.” Part of the confusion lay in the lack of consensus between Ivy League presidents and their sports-supporting alumni. When the Ivy League was created in 1956, it was to focus on athletics as a means of teaching and building character. Winning was incidental. But within its first decade, five of its coaches were let go for ‘losing’. The university administrations were unable to reconcile the creation of the Ivy League with the aspirations of donors.

== Post-Cornell employment ==
Even as the Athletic Department was lining up against James, he remained focused on decisions which would have a lasting influence on Cornell's Big Red. His former quarterback, Peter Dorset, was coaching small-fry football in Cortland, New York, when he spotted Gary Wood as a potential Cornell player. He made the recommendation, Lefty James agreed, and Wood – a future quarterback for the New York Giants – went on to become Cornell's best quarterback in the history of the sport. He reached his peak two years after James' removal. Lefty James himself did not go into retirement. He returned to his native Pennsylvania and continued to coach. From 1960 to 1965, he was head coach of the All-Pennsylvania team which challenged, annually, the best players from the State of Texas. This game was described by Sports Illustrated as "the country's roughest, toughest high school football game."

== Honors ==
In 1979 Coach James was inducted into Bucknell's Athletic Hall of Fame and two years later he would inducted into Cornell's as well. Ten years after his death, the Cornell Athletic Department mounted a marketing plan centered on a “Schoellkopf Sellout” pitch, designed to fill the Cornell stadium beyond the record achieved by Coach James’ in 1951, when his team drew 35,300 fans as the Big Red upset then-Rose Bowl champion Michigan, 20–7. Coach James and his James’ Men were honored at the half-time festivities. The university did not break Lefty's record.

== Education ==
George Kepford James received his primary education at New Cumberland, Lower Allen Township, Pennsylvania. He prepared for collegiate studies at Bellefonte Academy, and then took his Bachelor of Arts at Bucknell University.

== Associations ==
Coach James was a member of the American Football Coaches' Association (AFCA). He was also tapped into the Phi Kappa Psi fraternity at Bucknell University, and remained active in the Cornell chapter. Through the fraternity, he met and later employed, Alva Kelley and was inducted into Cornell's Irving Literary Society.

== Head coaching record ==
=== Football ===
Year	Team	Overall	Conference	Standing	Bowl/playoffs	Coaches^{#}	AP^{°}
Cornell Big Red (Independent) (1947–1955)
1947	Cornell	4–5					
1948	Cornell	8–1					19
1949	Cornell	8–1					12
1950	Cornell	7–2				T–20	
1951	Cornell	6–3					
1952	Cornell	2–7					
1953	Cornell	4–3–2					
1954	Cornell	5–4					
1955	Cornell	5–4					
Cornell Big Red (Ivy League) (1956–1960)
1956	Cornell	1–8	1–6	8th			
1957	Cornell	3–6	3–4	T–4th			
1958	Cornell	6–3	5–2	T–2nd			
1959	Cornell	5–4	3–4	T–5th			
1960	Cornell	2–7	1–6	T–7th			
Cornell:		66–58–2	13–22				
Total:		66–58–2					
^{#}Rankings from final Coaches Poll.; ^{°}Rankings from final AP Poll.
