= 1956 Navy Midshipmen football team =

American college football season

1956 Navy Midshipmen football
- Conference: Independent

Ranking
- Coaches: No. 19
- AP: No. 16
- Record: 6–1–2
- Head coach: Eddie Erdelatz (7th season)
- Captain: Earle Smith
- Home stadium: Thompson Stadium

1956 Southern major college football independents records
	Conf.			Overall
Team	W	L	T	W		L		T
No. 6 Miami (FL)		–		8	–	1	–	1
No. 16 Navy		–		6	–	1	–	2
Florida State		–		5	–	4	–	1
Texas Tech		–		2	–	7	–	1
Rankings from AP poll

The 1956 Navy Midshipmen football team represented the United States Naval Academy (USNA) as an independent during the 1956 college football season. The team was led by seventh-year head coach Eddie Erdelatz.

== Schedule ==
Date	Time	Opponent	Rank	Site	TV	Result	Attendance	Source
September 29		William & Mary^{†}		Thompson Stadium; Annapolis, MD		W 39–14	14,051	
October 6		at Cornell		Schoellkopf Field; Ithaca, NY		W 14–0	20,000	
October 13		at Tulane	No. 14	Tulane Stadium; New Orleans, LA		L 6–21	45,000	
October 20		Cincinnati		Thompson Stadium; Annapolis, MD		W 13–7	14,000	
October 27		at Penn		Franklin Field; Philadelphia, PA		W 54–6	24,721	
November 3		vs. Notre Dame		Memorial Stadium; Baltimore, MD (rivalry)		W 33–7	57,773	
November 10		at Duke	No. 12	Duke Stadium; Durham, NC		T 7–7	25,000	
November 17		vs. Virginia	No. 15	Memorial Stadium; Baltimore, MD		W 34–7	12,000	
December 1	1:15 p.m.	vs. Army	No. 13	Philadelphia Municipal Stadium; Philadelphia, PA (Army–Navy Game)	NBC	T 7–7	102,000	
^{†}Homecoming; Rankings from AP Poll released prior to the game; All times are in Eastern time; Source:
