= 1956 Brown Bears football team =

American college football season

1956 Brown Bears football
- Conference: Ivy League
- Record: 5–4 (3–4 Ivy)
- Head coach: Alva Kelley (6th season)
- Captain: Dick Bence
- Home stadium: Brown Stadium

1956 Ivy League football standings
	Conf.					Overall
Team	W		L		T	W		L		T
Yale $	7	–	0	–	0	8	–	1	–	0
Princeton	5	–	2	–	0	7	–	2	–	0
Dartmouth	4	–	3	–	0	5	–	4	–	0
Penn	4	–	3	–	0	4	–	5	–	0
Brown	3	–	4	–	0	5	–	4	–	0
Columbia	2	–	5	–	0	3	–	6	–	0
Harvard	2	–	5	–	0	2	–	6	–	0
Cornell	1	–	6	–	0	1	–	8	–	0
$ – Conference champion

The 1956 Brown Bears football team was an American football team that represented Brown University as a member of the Ivy League during the 1956 college football season.

In their sixth season under head coach Alva Kelley, the Bears compiled a 5–4 record and outscored opponents 124 to 94. Richard "Dick" Bence was the team captain.

The Bears' 3–4 conference record was good for fifth in the Ivy League. This was the first season of formal play for the Ivy League, although the Bears' previous independent schedules, dating back to the 19th century, often featured future Ivy opponents. Six of the seven Ivy matchups on Brown's 1956 schedule had been present on the 1955 slate, as well (as had the two remaining non-Ivy fixtures, Colgate and URI).

Brown played its home games at Brown Stadium in Providence, Rhode Island.

== Schedule ==
Date	Opponent	Site	Result	Attendance	Source
September 29	at Columbia	Baker Field; New York, NY	W 20–0	12,000	
October 6	at Yale	Yale Bowl; New Haven, CT	L 2–20	29,904	
October 13	Dartmouth	Brown Stadium; Providence, RI	L 7–14	12,500	
October 20	at Penn	Franklin Field; Philadelphia, PA	L 7–14	15,716	
October 27	Rhode Island*	Brown Stadium; Providence, RI (rivalry)	W 27–7		
November 3	at Princeton	Palmer Stadium; Princeton, NJ	L 7–21	15,000	
November 10	Cornell	Brown Stadium; Providence, RI	W 13–6	10,000	
November 17	at Harvard	Harvard Stadium; Boston, MA	W 21–12	13,500	
November 22	Colgate*	Brown Stadium; Providence, RI	W 20–0	10,500	
*Non-conference game
