= 1956 Penn State Nittany Lions football team =

American college football season

1956 Penn State Nittany Lions football
- Conference: Independent
- Record: 6–2–1
- Head coach: Rip Engle (7th season)
- Captain: Sam Valentine
- Home stadium: New Beaver Field

1956 Eastern major college football independents records
	Conf.			Overall
Team	W	L	T	W		L		T
No. 8 Syracuse		–		7	–	2	–	0
Penn State		–		6	–	2	–	1
No. 13 Pittsburgh		–		7	–	3	–	1
Army		–		5	–	3	–	1
Holy Cross		–		5	–	3	–	1
Villanova		–		5	–	4	–	0
Boston College		–		5	–	4	–	0
Colgate		–		4	–	5	–	0
Boston University		–		1	–	5	–	2
Rankings from AP poll

The 1956 Penn State Nittany Lions football team represented the Pennsylvania State University as an independent during the 1956 college football season. The team was coached by Rip Engle and played its home games in New Beaver Field in University Park, Pennsylvania.

== Schedule ==
Date	Opponent	Rank	Site	Result	Attendance	Source
September 29	at Penn		Franklin Field; Philadelphia, PA	W 34–0	23,390	
October 8	at No. 15 Army		Michie Stadium; West Point, NY	L 7–14	24,175–24,195	
October 13	Holy Cross^{†}		New Beaver Field; University Park, PA	W 43–0	24,870–25,828	
October 20	at No. 5 Ohio State		Ohio Stadium; Columbus, OH (rivalry)	W 7–6	82,584	
October 27	West Virginia	No. 18	New Beaver Field; University Park, PA (rivalry)	W 16–6	27,814–29,244	
November 3	at No. 17 Syracuse	No. 12	Archbold Stadium; Syracuse, NY (rivalry)	L 9–13	35,475	
November 10	Boston University		New Beaver Field; University Park, PA	W 40–7	28,240	
November 17	NC State		New Beaver Field; University Park, PA	W 14–7	22,864	
November 24	at No. 14 Pittsburgh		Pitt Stadium; Pittsburgh, PA (rivalry)	T 7–7	51,123–51,308	
^{†}Homecoming; Rankings from AP Poll released prior to the game; Source:
