= Alva Kelley =

American football player and coach (1918–1999)

Biographical details
- Born: June 16, 1918
- Died: August 21, 1999 (aged 81)

Playing career
- 1938–1940: Cornell
- Position: End

Coaching career (HC unless noted)
- 1946–1949: Cornell (assistant)
- 1950: Yale (line)
- 1951–1958: Brown
- 1959–1961: Colgate
- 1963–1970: Hobart

Head coaching record
- Overall: 60–98–5

Accomplishments and honors

Awards
- First-team All-Eastern (1939); Second-team All-Eastern (1940)

Alva E. Kelley (June 16, 1918 – August 21, 1999) was an American college football player and coach. He served as the head football coach at Brown University (1951–1958), Colgate University (1959–1961), and Hobart College (1963–1970), compiling a career college football record of 60–98–5.

== Career ==
Kelley graduated from Cornell University in 1941 after playing three seasons of football under Carl Snavely and fellow fraternity brother George K. James, including the 1939 undefeated national championship season. He was a member of Sphinx Head, the Phi Kappa Psi fraternity, and through the latter organization, the Irving Literary Society. He was assistant coach at Cornell from 1946 to 1949, before becoming head coach at Brown University and then Colgate. He was inducted into the Cornell Athletic Hall of Fame in 1980.

Kelley was the 27th head football coach at Colgate University, serving for three seasons, from 1959 to 1961, and compiling a record of 9–18.

== Personal life ==
One of his great-grandchildren, Will Levis, currently plays football for the Tennessee Titans of the NFL after spending the 2021 and 2022 seasons at the University of Kentucky as their starting quarterback. He also spent three seasons at Pennsylvania State University from 2018 to 2020.

== Head coaching record ==
| Year | Team | Overall | Conference | Standing | Bowl/playoffs |
|---|---|---|---|---|---|
Brown Bears (Independent) (1951–1955)
| 1951 | Brown | 2–7 | | | |
| 1952 | Brown | 2–7 | | | |
| 1953 | Brown | 3–5–1 | | | |
| 1954 | Brown | 6–2–1 | | | |
| 1955 | Brown | 2–7 | | | |
Brown Bears (Ivy League) (1956–1958)
| 1956 | Brown | 5–4 | 3–4 | 5th | |
| 1957 | Brown | 5–4 | 3–4 | T–4th | |
| 1958 | Brown | 6–3 | 4–3 | T–4th | |
| Brown: | | 31–39–2 | 10–11 | | |
Colgate Red Raiders (Independent) (1959–1961)
| 1959 | Colgate | 2–7 | | | |
| 1960 | Colgate | 2–7 | | | |
| 1961 | Colgate | 5–4 | | | |
| Colgate: | | 9–18 | | | |
Hobart Statesmen (NCAA College Division independent) (1963–1964)
| 1963 | Hobart | 4–3–1 | | | |
| 1964 | Hobart | 3–4–1 | | | |
Alfred Saxons (Independent College Athletic Conference) (1965–1970)
| 1965 | Hobart | 4–4 | 2–2 | T–3rd | |
| 1966 | Hobart | 3–5 | 1–3 | T–4th | |
| 1967 | Hobart | 0–7–1 | 0–3–1 | 5th | |
| 1968 | Hobart | 3–5 | 1–2 | 4th | |
| 1969 | Hobart | 3–5 | 1–2 | 3rd | |
| 1970 | Hobart | 0–8 | 0–3 | 4th | |
| Hobart: | | 20–41–3 | 5–15–1 | | |
| Total: | | 60–98–5 | | | |
