= 1956 college football rankings =

- Season: 1956
- Bowl season: 1956–57 bowl games
- Preseason No. 1: Oklahoma
- End of season champions: Oklahoma

The 1956 college football rankings were an effort to rank the American football teams participating in the 1956 college football season. College football's governing body, the National Collegiate Athletic Association (NCAA), did not issue rankings or conduct a championship game or playoffs to determine a national champion. The most widely-reported rankings were published by two of the major news agencies based on polling conducted on a weekly basis during the season.

- The Associated Press (AP) conducted a weekly poll of sports writers throughout the country. This was known as the AP poll or the "writers poll".
- The United Press International (UPI) conducted a weekly poll of the nation's head football coaches. This was known as the UPI poll or the "coaches poll".

At the end of the regular season, Oklahoma was ranked No. 1 in both the AP and UPI polls. Oklahoma did not participate in a bowl game. Neither agency conducted polling after the bowl games.

Though not as widely reported as the AP and UPI polls, some newspapers also reported on a mathematical ranking system developed by Vanderbilt University professor Edward Litkenhous. These were known as the Litkenhous Ratings. Oklahoma was also ranked No. 1 in the Litkenhouse Ratings. Whereas the AP and UPI polls ranked the top 20 teams, Litkenhouse ranked every college football team, and his rankings from 1 to 100 are included below.

== Legend ==
	Increase in ranking
	Decrease in ranking
	Not ranked previous week
	National champion
(#–#)	Win–loss record
(Italics)	Number of first place votes
т	Tied with team above or below also with this symbol

== AP poll ==
The final AP poll was released on December 3, at the end of the regular season, weeks before the major bowls. The AP did not release poll after the bowl season regularly until 1968.

	Preseason Aug	Week 1 Sep 24	Week 2 Oct 1	Week 3 Oct 8	Week 4 Oct 15	Week 5 Oct 22	Week 6 Oct 29	Week 7 Nov 5	Week 8 Nov 12	Week 9 Nov 19	Week 10 Nov 26	Week 11 (Final) Dec 3	
1.	Oklahoma (111)	Oklahoma (0–0) (91)	Oklahoma (1–0) (60)	Oklahoma (2–0) (76)	Oklahoma (3–0) (67)	Michigan State (4–0) (96)	Oklahoma (5–0) (143)	Oklahoma (6–0) (116)	Tennessee (7–0) (58)	Oklahoma (8–0) (111)	Oklahoma (9–0) (81)	Oklahoma (10–0) (104)	1.
2.	Michigan State (20)	Georgia Tech (1–0) (12)	Michigan State (1–0) (17)	Michigan State (2–0) (32)	Michigan State (3–0) (45)	Oklahoma (4–0) (44)	Georgia Tech (5–0) (31)	Georgia Tech (6–0) (30)	Oklahoma (7–0) (92)	Tennessee (8–0) (69)	Tennessee (9–0) (49)	Tennessee (10–0) (48)	2.
3.	Notre Dame (5)	Michigan State (0–0) (9)	Georgia Tech (1–0) (5)	Georgia Tech (2–0) (4)	Georgia Tech (3–0) (5)	Georgia Tech (4–0) (9)	Tennessee (5–0) (8)	Tennessee (6–0) (1)	Michigan State (6–1) (3)	Iowa (7–1) (6)	Iowa (8–1) (12)	Iowa (8–1) (15)	3.
4.	Georgia Tech (3)	TCU (1–0) (4)	Ohio State (1–0)	TCU (2–0) (7)	TCU (3–0) (2)	Tennessee (4–0) (4)	Michigan State (4–1)	Michigan State (5–1) (7)	Georgia Tech (6–1)	Texas A&M (8–0–1)	Georgia Tech (8–1) (2)	Georgia Tech (9–1) (4)	4.
5.	Ohio State	SMU (1–0) (10)	Michigan (1–0) (2)	Ohio State (2–0) (1)	Ohio State (3–0)	Michigan (3–1)	Texas A&M (5–0–1)	Texas A&M (6–0–1) (1)	Texas A&M (7–0–1) (1)	Georgia Tech (7–1) (1)	Texas A&M (8–0–1) (1)	Texas A&M (9–0–1) (2)	5.
6.	Maryland	USC (1–0) (12)	Ole Miss (2–0) (5)	Tennessee (2–0) (5)	Ole Miss (4–0) (7)	USC (4–0) (2)	Ohio State (4–1) (1)	Minnesota (5–0–1)	Ohio State (6–1) (1)	Miami (FL) (6–0–1) (5)	Miami (FL) (7–0–1) (8)	Miami (FL) (8–0–1) (12)	6.
7.	TCU (2)	Syracuse (1–0) (4)	Pittsburgh (2–0) (1)	Ole Miss (3–0) (2)	Tennessee (3–0) (3)	Texas A&M (4–0–1) (1)	Iowa (5–0)	Ohio State (5–1) (1)	Iowa (6–1)	Minnesota (6–1–1)	Michigan (7–2) (2)	Michigan (7–2) (1)	7.
8.	Michigan (2)	Ohio State (0–0)	TCU (1–0) (1)	USC (3–0)	Michigan (2–1)	Baylor (4–0)	Minnesota (4–0–1)	Miami (FL) (5–0–1) (1)	Miami (FL) (5–0–1) (1)	Syracuse (7–1) (2)	Syracuse (7–1) (1)	Syracuse (7–1)	8.
9.	Texas A&M	Ole Miss (1–0)	Tennessee (1–0) (3)	Texas A&M (3–0)	USC (3–0)	Ohio State (3–1)	Miami (FL) (4–0–1) (1)	Syracuse (5–1) (1)	Syracuse (6–1)	Michigan (6–2)	Michigan State (7–2)	Michigan State (7–2)	9.
10.	Pittsburgh (2)	Pittsburgh (1–0) (2)	USC (2–0) (1)	Baylor (3–0)	Baylor (4–0)	Ole Miss (4–1) т	Stanford (4–2)	Michigan (4–2)	Michigan (5–2)	Michigan State (6–2)	Minnesota (6–1–2)	Oregon State (7–2–1) (3)	10.
11.	Army	Texas A&M (1–0)	Texas A&M (2–0)	Miami (FL) (2–0) (1)	Miami (FL) (3–0) (1)	TCU (3–1) т	Pittsburgh (4–1)	Clemson (5–0–1)	Oregon State (6–2) (1)	Oregon State (7–2) (1)	Oregon State (7–2–1) (1)	Baylor (8–2) (1)	11.
12.	Tennessee (2)	Stanford (1–0) (4)	SMU (1–1)	Michigan (1–1)	Iowa (3–0)	Iowa (4–0)	Penn State (4–1)	Navy (5–1) (3)	Florida (6–1–1) (2)	Ohio State (6–2)	Pittsburgh (6–2–1)	Minnesota (6–1–2)	12.
13.	Ole Miss	Michigan (0–0)	Illinois (1–0) т	Vanderbilt (3–0)	Syracuse (2–1)	Pittsburgh (3–1)	Clemson (4–0–1)	Florida (5–1–1)	Clemson (5–0–2)	Florida (6–1–1) (2)	Navy (6–1–1)	Pittsburgh (6–2–1)	13.
14.	Stanford	Notre Dame (0–1)	Miami (FL) (1–0) т	Navy (2–0)	Texas A&M (3–0–1)	Syracuse (3–1)	George Washington (5–0–1)	Oregon State (5–2)	USC (6–1)	Pittsburgh (6–2)	TCU (6–3)	TCU (7–3)	14.
15.	USC (2)	Vanderbilt (1–0)	Army (1–0)	Army (2–0)	Clemson (3–0–1)	Tulane (4–1)	Baylor (4–1) т	Iowa (5–1)	Navy (5–1–1)	Navy (6–1–1) (1)	Baylor (7–2)	Ohio State (6–3)	15.
16.	Duke	Army (0–0)	Baylor (2–0)	George Washington (3–0) (1)	Pittsburgh (2–1)	Virginia Tech (5–1)	Virginia Tech (6–1) т	USC (5–1)	Pittsburgh (5–2)	Baylor (6–2)	George Washington (7–1–1)	Navy (6–1–2)	16.
17.	UCLA	South Carolina (2–0)	Notre Dame (0–1)	Minnesota (2–0)	Purdue (2–1)	George Washington (4–0–1)	Michigan (3–2) т	TCU (4–2)	Minnesota (5–1–1)	George Washington (7–1–1)	USC (7–2)	George Washington (7–1–1)	17.
18.	Miami (FL)	Oregon (1–0)	Syracuse (1–0) т	Notre Dame (1–1)	Virginia Tech (4–1)	Penn State (3–1)	Oregon State (4–2) т	Colorado (5–2)	George Washington (6–1–1)	TCU (5–3)	Florida (6–2–1)	USC (8–2)	18.
19.	Yale	Florida (1–0) (2)	Vanderbilt (2–0) т	SMU (2–1)	Tulane (3–1)	Miami (FL) (3–0–1)	Syracuse (4–1) т	UCLA (5–2) (1)	Ole Miss (6–2)	Wyoming (10–0)	Colorado (7–2–1)	Clemson (7–1–2)	19.
20.	Illinois	NC State (1–0)	Iowa (1–0)	South Carolina (3–1) т; West Virginia (2–1) т	South Carolina (4–1)	Clemson (3–0–1)	USC (4–1)	Pittsburgh (4–2) т; Stanford (4–3) т	Princeton (7–0)	Colorado (6–2–1)	Ohio State (6–3)	Colorado (7–2–1)	20.
	Preseason Aug	Week 1 Sep 24	Week 2 Oct 1	Week 3 Oct 8	Week 4 Oct 15	Week 5 Oct 22	Week 6 Oct 29	Week 7 Nov 5	Week 8 Nov 12	Week 9 Nov 19	Week 10 Nov 26	Week 11 (Final) Dec 3	
		Dropped: Duke; Illinois; Maryland; Miami (FL); Tennessee; UCLA; Yale	Dropped: Florida; NC State; Oregon; South Carolina; Stanford	Dropped: Illinois; Iowa; Pittsburgh; Syracuse	Dropped: Army; George Washington; Minnesota; Navy; Notre Dame; SMU; Vanderbilt; West Virginia	Dropped: Purdue; South Carolina	Dropped: Ole Miss; TCU; Tulane	Dropped: Baylor; George Washington; Penn State; Virginia Tech	Dropped: Colorado; Stanford; TCU; UCLA	Dropped: Clemson; Ole Miss; Princeton; USC	Dropped: Wyoming	Dropped: Florida	

== United Press Coaches Poll ==
The final United Press (UP) Coaches Poll was released prior to the bowl games, on December 4.
Oklahoma received 26 of the 35 first-place votes; Tennessee received five, Iowa three, and Miami one.

UP poll
Rank	Team	1st	Points
1	Oklahoma	26	337
2	Tennessee	5	301
3	Iowa	3	247
4	Georgia Tech	0	211
5	Texas A&M	0	202
6	Miami (FL)	1	134
7	Michigan	0	115
8	Syracuse	0	63
9	Minnesota	0	60
10	Michigan State	0	55
11	Baylor	0	46
12	Pittsburgh	0	36
13	Oregon State	0	21
14	TCU	0	18
15	USC	0	15
16	Wyoming	0	13
17	Yale	0	10
18	Colorado	0	9
19	Navy	0	8
20	Duke	0	6

== Litkenhous Ratings ==
The final Litkenhous Ratings, released in December 1956, ranked over 600 teams. The top 100 teams as ranked by Litkenhous were:

1. Oklahoma
2. Tennessee
3. Georgia Tech
4. Michigan State
5. Michigan
6. Iowa
7. Texas A&M
8. TCU
9. Ohio State
10. Minnesota
11. Ole Miss
12. Baylor
13. Florida
14. Miami (FL)
15. Duke
16. Texas Western
17. Auburn
18. USC
19. Pittsburgh
20. Oregon State
21. Kentucky
22. Syracuse
23. Penn State
24. Washington University
25. Arizona State
26. Houston
27. Illinois
28. Purdue
29. UCLA
30. Oregon
31. Colorado
32. Stanford
33. Mississippi Southern
34. Vanderbilt
35. Tulane
36. Northwestern
37. Arkansas
38. Rice
39. Wisconsin
40. California
41. Navy
42. Virginia Tech
43. Clemson
44. Florida State
45. Army
46. South Carolina
47. Mississippi State
48. LSU
49. SMU
50. Southeastern Louisiana
51. Georgia
52. Missouri
53. West Texas
54. Alabama
55. Villanova
56. Pacific
57. Texas
58. Wake Forest
59. Maryland
60. Tulsa
61. North Carolina
62.
63.
64. Kansas
65. West Virginia
66. Washington State
67. Oklahoma A&M
68. Yale
69. Texas Tech
70. Notre Dame
71. Xavier
72. NC State
73. Wyoming
74.
75. Utah
76.
77.
78. Virginia
79.
80. Hardin Simmons
81. Arizona
82. George Washington
83. Boston College
84. Miami (OH)
85. Nebraska
86. Indiana
87.
88. Bowling Green
89.
90.
91.
92. Memphis State
93. Holy Cross
94. Cincinnati
95.
96. Princeton
97. Chattanooga 98.
99.
100.
105. Air Force
106. Colgate
107. Utah State
109. Kansas State
110. Dayton
117. Dartmouth
118. Denver
120. Wichita
122. Furman
123. Middle Tennessee
126. VMI
128. Louisville
129. Boston University
131. Iowa State
132. Detroit
135. Brown
140. Davidson
147. Citadel
151. Arkansas State
156. Richmond
159. William & Mary
160. Murray
168. Harvard
172. Ohio
177. Tennessee Tech
180. Florence
183. Eastern Kentucky

== See also ==
- 1956 College Football All-America Team
