= 1956–57 NCAA football bowl games =

College football postseason game series

- Season: 1956
- Number of bowls: 7
- All-star games: Blue–Gray Football Classic; East–West Shrine Game; North–South Shrine Game; Senior Bowl
- Bowl games: December 29, 1956 – January 1, 1957 (Note: Excludes all-star games.)
- Champions: Oklahoma (AP, Coaches, FWAA)
Bowl record by conference
Conference	Bowls	Record	Number of teams in final AP poll
Independents	3	0–3 (0.000)	4
SWC	2	2–0 (1.000)	3
Border	2	1–1 (0.500)	0
SEC	2	1–1 (0.500)	2
Big Seven	1	1–0 (1.000)	2
Big Ten	1	1–0 (1.000)	5
SoCon	1	1–0 (1.000)	1
ACC	1	0–1 (0.000)	1
PCC	1	0–1 (0.000)	2

The 1956–57 NCAA football bowl games were a series of post-season games played in December 1956 and January 1957 to end the 1956 college football season. A total of seven team-competitive games, and four all-star games, were played. The post-season began with the Gator Bowl on December 29, 1956, and concluded on January 5, 1957, with the season-ending Senior Bowl all-star game.

== Schedule ==
The following table lists bowl games involving University Division teams; bowl games at lower levels are listed in the See also section.

Date	Game	Site	Time (US EST)	TV	Matchup (pre-game record)	AP pre-game rank	UPI (Coaches) pre-game rank
12/29	Gator Bowl	Gator Bowl Stadium; Jacksonville, Florida	2:00 p.m.	CBS	Georgia Tech 7 (9–1) (SEC), Pittsburgh 14 (7–2–1) (Independent)	#4 #13	#4 #12
1/1	Cotton Bowl Classic	Cotton Bowl; Dallas, Texas	2:00 p.m.	NBC	TCU 28 (7–3) (SWC), Syracuse 27 (7–1) (Independent)	#14 #8	#14 #8
1/1	Orange Bowl	Burdine Stadium; Miami	2:00 p.m.	CBS	Colorado 27 (7–2–1) (Big Seven), Clemson 21 (7–1–1) (ACC)	#20 #19	#18; NR
1/1	Sugar Bowl	Tulane Stadium; New Orleans, Louisiana	2:00 p.m.	ABC	Baylor 13 (8–2) (SWC), Tennessee 7 (10–0) (SEC†)	#11 #2	#11 #2
1/1	Sun Bowl	Kidd Field; El Paso, Texas	4:30 p.m.	—	George Washington 13 (7–1–1) (SoCon), Texas Western 0 (9–1) (Border†)	#17; NR	NR; NR
1/1	Rose Bowl	Rose Bowl; Pasadena, California	5:00 p.m.	NBC	Iowa 35 (8–1) (Big Ten†), Oregon State 19 (7–2–1) (PCC†)	#3 #10	#3 #13
1/1	Tangerine Bowl	Tangerine Bowl (stadium); Orlando, Florida	8:00 p.m.	—	West Texas State 20 (7–2) (Border), Mississippi Southern 13 (7–1–1) (Independent)	NR n/a	NR n/a

† denotes conference champion

=== Conference performance in bowl games ===
Conference	Games	Record			Bowls	
Conference	Games	W	L	Pct.	Won	Lost
Independents	3	0	3	.000	—	Cotton, Gator, Tangerine
SWC	2	2	0	1.000	Cotton, Sugar	—
Border	2	1	1	.500	Tangerine	Sun
SEC	2	1	1	.500	Gator	Sugar
Big Seven	1	1	0	1.000	Orange	—
Big Ten	1	1	0	1.000	Rose	—
Southern	1	1	0	1.000	Sun	—
ACC	1	0	1	.000	—	Orange
Pacific Coast	1	0	1	.000	—	Rose

== See also ==
- Aluminum Bowl
- Burley Bowl
- Prairie View Bowl
- Refrigerator Bowl
