= 1956 Drake Bulldogs football team =

American college football season

1956 Drake Bulldogs football
- Conference: Independent
- Record: 3–6
- Head coach: Warren Gaer (8th season)
- Home stadium: Drake Stadium

1956 Midwestern major college football independents records
	Conf.			Overall
Team	W	L	T	W		L		T
Cincinnati		–		4	–	5	–	0
Dayton		–		4	–	6	–	0
Drake		–		3	–	6	–	0
Notre Dame		–		2	–	8	–	0
Marquette		–		0	–	9	–	0

The 1956 Drake Bulldogs football team represented the Drake University as an independent during the 1956 college football season. Led by Warren Gaer in his 8th season as head coach, the Bulldogs compiled an overall record of 3–6. Drake played home games at Drake Stadium in Des Moines, Iowa.

== Schedule ==
Date	Opponent	Site	Result	Attendance	Source
September 15	Utah State	Drake Stadium; Des Moines, IA	L 33–39	13,000	
September 22	at San Jose State	Spartan Stadium; San Jose, CA	L 7–26	12,000	
September 29	at Iowa State Teachers	O. R. Latham Stadium; Cedar Falls, IA	L 0–20	5,600	
October 6	Bowling Green	Drake Stadium; Des Moines, IA	L 7–46	4,500	
October 13	Washington University	Drake Stadium; Des Moines, IA	W 14–6	250	
October 20	at Wichita	Veterans Field; Wichita, KS	L 14–27	13,132	
October 27	Bradley	Drake Stadium; Des Moines, IA	W 55–47	5,000	
November 3	at Iowa State	Clyde Williams Field; Ames, IA	L 14–39	8,140	
November 10	at Detroit	University of Detroit Stadium; Detroit, MI	W 26–13	8,366	
