= 1956 Tulsa Golden Hurricane football team =

American college football season

1956 Tulsa Golden Hurricane football
- Conference: Missouri Valley Conference
- Record: 7–2–1 (2–1–1 MVC)
- Head coach: Bobby Dobbs (2nd season)
- Home stadium: Skelly Field

1956 Missouri Valley Conference football standings
	Conf.					Overall
Team	W		L		T	W		L		T
Houston $	4	–	0	–	0	7	–	2	–	1
Tulsa	2	–	1	–	1	7	–	2	–	1
Oklahoma A&M	2	–	1	–	1	3	–	5	–	2
Wichita	1	–	3	–	0	4	–	7	–	0
Detroit	0	–	4	–	0	2	–	8	–	0
$ – Conference champion

The 1956 Tulsa Golden Hurricane football team represented the University of Tulsa during the 1956 college football season. In their second year under head coach Bobby Dodds, the Golden Hurricane compiled a 7–2–1 record (2–1–1 against Missouri Valley Conference opponents), finished in second place in the conference, and ranked seventh of 111 teams in scoring defense with an average of 6.7 points allowed per game.

The team's statistical leaders included George Cagliola with 394 passing yards, Dick Hughes with 618 rushing yards, and Ronnie Morris with 150 receiving yards.

== Schedule ==
Date	Opponent	Site	Result	Attendance	Source
September 15	New Mexico A&M*	Skelly Field; Tulsa, OK	W 27–6	17,013	
September 29	at Cincinnati*	Nippert Stadium; Cincinnati, OK	L 6–7	17,000	
October 6	Marquette*	Skelly Field; Tulsa, OK	W 54–0	13,718	
October 13	Oklahoma A&M^{†}	Skelly Field; Tulsa, OK (rivalry)	T 14–14	19,391	
October 20	at Detroit	University of Detroit Stadium; Detroit, MI	W 3–0	9,118	
October 27	Hardin–Simmons*	Skelly Field; Tulsa, OK	W 27–0	13,944	
November 3	Pacific (CA)*	Skelly Field; Tulsa, OK	W 14–13	15,500	
November 10	at Houston	Rice Stadium; Houston, TX	L 0–14	20,000	
November 17	Texas Tech*	Skelly Field; Tulsa, OK	W 10–7	12,152	
November 24	Wichita	Skelly Field; Tulsa, OK	W 14–6	13,121	
*Non-conference game; ^{†}Homecoming; Source:
