= 1956 Kansas Jayhawks football team =

American college football season

1956 Kansas Jayhawks football
- Conference: Big Seven Conference
- Record: 3–6–1 (2–4 Big 7)
- Head coach: Chuck Mather (3rd season)
- Captain: Galen Wahlmeier
- Home stadium: Memorial Stadium

1956 Big Seven Conference football standings
	Conf.					Overall
Team	W		L		T	W		L		T
No. 1 Oklahoma $	6	–	0	–	0	10	–	0	–	0
No. 20 Colorado	4	–	1	–	1	8	–	2	–	1
Missouri	3	–	2	–	1	4	–	5	–	1
Nebraska	3	–	3	–	0	4	–	6	–	0
Kansas	2	–	4	–	0	3	–	6	–	1
Kansas State	2	–	4	–	0	3	–	7	–	0
Iowa State	0	–	6	–	0	2	–	8	–	0
$ – Conference champion; Rankings from AP Poll

The 1956 Kansas Jayhawks football team represented the University of Kansas in the Big Seven Conference during the 1956 college football season. In their third season under head coach Chuck Mather, the Jayhawks compiled a 3–6–1 record (2–4 against conference opponents), finished tied for fifth in the Big Seven Conference, and were outscored by all opponents by a combined total of 215 to 163. They played their home games at Memorial Stadium in Lawrence, Kansas.

The team's statistical leaders included Homer Floyd with 638 rushing yards, Charlie McCue with 48 points scored, and Wally Strauch with 596 passing yards. Galen Wahlmeier was the team captain.

== Schedule ==
Date	Opponent	Site	Result	Attendance	Source
September 22	No. 7 TCU*	Memorial Stadium; Lawrence, KS	L 0–32	28,000	
September 29	Pacific (CA)*	Memorial Stadium; Lawrence, KS	T 27–27	17,000	
October 6	Colorado	Memorial Stadium; Lawrence, KS	L 25–26	20,000	
October 13	at Iowa State	Clyde Williams Field; Ames, IA	W 25–14	10,000	
October 20	No. 1 Oklahoma	Memorial Stadium; Lawrence, KS	L 12–34	31,000	
October 26	at Oklahoma A&M*	Lewis Field; Stillwater, OK	W 21–13	14,000	
November 3	at Kansas State	Memorial Stadium; Manhattan, KS (rivalry)	W 20–15	19,000	
November 10	Nebraska^{†}	Memorial Stadium; Lawrence, KS (rivalry)	L 20–26	26,422	
November 17	at UCLA*	Los Angeles Memorial Coliseum; Los Angeles, CA	L 0–13	21,913	
December 1	at Missouri	Memorial Stadium; Columbia, MO (Border War)	L 13–15	28,000	
*Non-conference game; ^{†}Homecoming; Rankings from AP Poll released prior to the game; Source:
