= 1956 Tampa Spartans football team =

American college football season

1956 Tampa Spartans football
- Conference: Independent
- Record: 7–2
- Head coach: Marcelino Huerta (5th season)
- Home stadium: Phillips Field

1956 Southern non-major college football independents records
	Conf.			Overall
Team	W	L	T	W		L		T
Tampa		–		7	–	2	–	0
Mississippi Southern		–		7	–	2	–	1
Louisville		–		6	–	3	–	0
Delaware		–		5	–	3	–	1
Memphis State		–		5	–	4	–	1
Arkansas State		–		5	–	4	–	0
Chattanooga		–		5	–	4	–	0
Howard (AL)		–		2	–	5	–	2
Sewanee		–		1	–	6	–	1

The 1956 Tampa Spartans football team represented the University of Tampa as an independent during the 1956 college football season. It was the Spartans' 20th season. The team was led by head coach Marcelino Huerta, in his fifth year, and played their home games at Phillips Field in Tampa, Florida. They finished with a record of seven wins and two losses (7–2).

== Schedule ==
Date	Opponent	Site	Result	Attendance	Source
September 22	Morris Harvey	Phillips Field; Tampa, FL	W 16–0	8,000–8,500	
September 29	Troy State	Phillips Field; Tampa, FL	W 32–19		
October 6	at Southeastern Louisiana	Strawberry Stadium; Hammond, LA	L 6–40		
October 20	Presbyterian	Phillips Field; Tampa, FL	W 19–7		
October 27	Delta State	Phillips Field; Tampa, FL	W 21–12		
November 2	at Chattanooga	Chamberlain Field; Chattanooga, TN	L 0–33		
November 10	Western Carolina	Phillips Field; Tampa, FL	W 41–9		
November 17	Appalachian State	Phillips Field; Tampa, FL	W 21–7	6,500	
November 24	Missouri Valley	Phillips Field; Tampa, FL	W 31–14	4,000	
