= 1956 Kansas State Wildcats football team =

American college football season

1956 Kansas State Wildcats football
- Conference: Big Seven Conference
- Record: 3–7 (2–4 Big 7)
- Head coach: Bus Mertes (2nd season)
- Home stadium: Memorial Stadium

1956 Big Seven Conference football standings
	Conf.					Overall
Team	W		L		T	W		L		T
No. 1 Oklahoma $	6	–	0	–	0	10	–	0	–	0
No. 20 Colorado	4	–	1	–	1	8	–	2	–	1
Missouri	3	–	2	–	1	4	–	5	–	1
Nebraska	3	–	3	–	0	4	–	6	–	0
Kansas	2	–	4	–	0	3	–	6	–	1
Kansas State	2	–	4	–	0	3	–	7	–	0
Iowa State	0	–	6	–	0	2	–	8	–	0
$ – Conference champion; Rankings from AP Poll

The 1956 Kansas State Wildcats football team represented Kansas State University in the 1956 college football season. The team's head football coach was Bus Mertes, in his second year at the helm of the Wildcats. The Wildcats played their home games in Memorial Stadium. The Wildcats finished the season with a 3–7 record with a 2–4 record in conference play. They finished tied for fifth place in the Big Seven Conference. The Wildcats scored 110 points and gave up 192 points.

== Schedule ==
Date	Opponent	Site	Result	Attendance	Source
September 22	Oklahoma A&M*	Memorial Stadium; Manhattan, KS	L 7–27	15,000	
September 29	at Colorado	Folsom Field; Boulder, CO (rivalry)	L 0–34	21,000	
October 6	at No. 1 Oklahoma	Oklahoma Memorial Stadium; Norman, OK	L 0–66	42,000	
October 13	at Nebraska	Memorial Stadium; Lincoln, NE (rivalry)	W 10–7	24,000	
October 20	Missouri	Memorial Stadium; Manhattan, KS	L 6–20	13,000	
October 27	Wyoming*	War Memorial Stadium; Laramie, WY	L 15-27	6,731	
November 3	Kansas	Memorial Stadium; Manhattan, KS (rivalry)	L 15–20	19,000	
November 10	at Marquette*	Marquette Stadium; Milwaukee, WI	W 41–14	10,300	
November 17	Iowa State^{†}	Memorial Stadium; Manhattan, KS (rivalry)	W 32–6	12,000	
November 24	at No. 10 Michigan State*	Macklin Stadium; East Lansing, MI	L 17–38	34,119	
*Non-conference game; ^{†}Homecoming; Rankings from AP Poll released prior to the game; Source:
