= 1956 Delaware Fightin' Blue Hens football team =

American college football season

1956 Delaware Fightin' Blue Hens football
- Conference: Independent
- Record: 5–3–1
- Head coach: David M. Nelson (6th season)
- Captain: Tom Thomas
- Home stadium: Delaware Stadium

1956 Southern non-major college football independents records
	Conf.			Overall
Team	W	L	T	W		L		T
Tampa		–		7	–	2	–	0
Mississippi Southern		–		7	–	2	–	1
Louisville		–		6	–	3	–	0
Delaware		–		5	–	3	–	1
Memphis State		–		5	–	4	–	1
Arkansas State		–		5	–	4	–	0
Chattanooga		–		5	–	4	–	0
Howard (AL)		–		2	–	5	–	2
Sewanee		–		1	–	6	–	1

The 1956 Delaware Fightin' Blue Hens football team was an American football team that represented the University of Delaware as an independent during the 1956 college football season. In its sixth season under head coach David M. Nelson, the team compiled a 5–3–1 record and outscored opponents by a total of 151 to 108. Vincent Grande was the team captain. The team played its home games at Delaware Stadium in Newark, Delaware.

== Schedule ==
Date	Opponent	Site	Result	Attendance	Source
September 22	West Chester	Delaware Stadium; Newark, DE (rivalry)	L 7–10	5,800	
September 29	at Lehigh	Taylor Stadium; Bethlehem, PA (rivalry)	W 33–7	3,500	
October 6	Lafayette	Delaware Stadium; Newark, DE	L 14–28	5,800	
October 13	Bucknell	Delaware Stadium; Newark, DE	W 26–17	6,500	
October 20	at New Hampshire	Cowell Stadium; Durham, NH	W 14–6	7,000	
October 27	at Connecticut	Memorial Stadium; Storrs, CT	L 14–26	5,656	
November 3	NTS Bainbridge	Delaware Stadium; Newark, DE	T 7–7	7,100	
November 10	Rutgers	Delaware Stadium; Newark, DE	W 22–0	5,000	
November 17	Temple	Delaware Stadium; Newark, DE	W 14–7	2,500	
