= Pete Tillman =

American football player and coach (1922–1998)

Biographical details
- Born: May 9, 1922; Mangum, Oklahoma, U.S.
- Died: March 31, 1998 (aged 75); Farmington, New Mexico, U.S.

Playing career
- 1946–1948: Oklahoma
- 1949: Baltimore Colts (AAFC)
- Position: Center

Coaching career (HC unless noted)
- 1954: Wichita (assistant)
- 1955–1956: Wichita
- 1957 (spring): Washington (assistant)

Head coaching record
- Overall: 11–8–1

Accomplishments and honors

Championships
- 1 MVC (1955)

Alonzo Monroe Tillman (May 9, 1922 – March 31, 1998), better known as Pete Tillman, was an American football player and coach. He played college football at the University of Oklahoma from 1946 to 1948 and professionally in the All-America Football Conference (AAFC) with the Baltimore Colts in 1949. Tillman served as the head football coach at the Municipal University of Wichita—now Wichita State University —from 1955 to 1956, compiling a record of 11–8–1. Tillman's team won a share of the Missouri Valley Conference championship in 1955 with a record of 7–2–1. Tillman served briefly as an assistant coach at the University of Washington in the spring of 1957. He resigned in April to go into private business in Wichita, Kansas.

== Head coaching record ==
Year	Team	Overall	Conference	Standing	Bowl/playoffs
Wichita Shockers (Missouri Valley Conference) (1955–1956)
1955	Wichita	7–2–1	3–1	T–1st	
1956	Wichita	4–6	1–3	4th	
Wichita:		11–8–1	4–4		
Total:		11–8–1			
National championship Conference title Conference division title or championship game berth
