= 1956 Mississippi Southern Southerners football team =

American college football season

1956 Mississippi Southern Southerners football

Tangerine Bowl, L 13–20 vs. West Texas State
- Conference: Independent
- Record: 7–2–1
- Head coach: Thad Vann (8th season)
- Home stadium: Faulkner Field

1956 Southern non-major college football independents records
	Conf.			Overall
Team	W	L	T	W		L		T
Tampa		–		7	–	2	–	0
Mississippi Southern		–		7	–	2	–	1
Louisville		–		6	–	3	–	0
Delaware		–		5	–	3	–	1
Memphis State		–		5	–	4	–	1
Arkansas State		–		5	–	4	–	0
Chattanooga		–		5	–	4	–	0
Howard (AL)		–		2	–	5	–	2
Sewanee		–		1	–	6	–	1

The 1956 Mississippi Southern Southerners football team was an American football team that represented Mississippi Southern College (now known as the University of Southern Mississippi) as an independent during the 1956 college football season. In their eighth year under head coach Thad Vann, the team compiled a 7–2–1 record.

== Schedule ==
Date	Opponent	Site	Result	Attendance	Source
September 22	Louisiana Tech	Faulkner Field; Hattiesburg, MS (rivalry)	W 14–0	10,000	
October 6	at Dayton	UD Stadium; Dayton, OH	W 23–6	7,895	
October 13	Southeastern Louisiana	Faulkner Field; Hattiesburg, MS	W 21–14	12,500	
October 20	Memphis State	Faulkner Field; Hattiesburg, MS (rivalry)	W 27–0	6,500	
October 27	Chattanooga	Faulkner Field; Hattiesburg, MS	W 33–0	6,500	
November 3	Abilene Christian^{†}	Faulkner Field; Hattiesburg, MS	W 36–6	15,000	
November 10	at Trinity (TX)	Alamo Stadium; San Antonio, TX	W 20–13	6,081	
November 17	at Florida State	Doak Campbell Stadium; Tallahassee, FL	L 19–20	12,200	
November 24	at Alabama	Denny Stadium; Tuscaloosa, AL	T 13–13	16,000	
January 1, 1957	vs. West Texas State	Tangerine Bowl; Orlando, FL (Tangerine Bowl)	L 13–20	12,000	
^{†}Homecoming
