= 1956 Nebraska Cornhuskers football team =

American college football season

1956 Nebraska Cornhuskers football
- Conference: Big Seven Conference
- Record: 4–6 (3–3 Big 7)
- Head coach: Pete Elliott (1st season)
- Home stadium: Memorial Stadium

1956 Big Seven Conference football standings
	Conf.					Overall
Team	W		L		T	W		L		T
No. 1 Oklahoma $	6	–	0	–	0	10	–	0	–	0
No. 20 Colorado	4	–	1	–	1	8	–	2	–	1
Missouri	3	–	2	–	1	4	–	5	–	1
Nebraska	3	–	3	–	0	4	–	6	–	0
Kansas	2	–	4	–	0	3	–	6	–	1
Kansas State	2	–	4	–	0	3	–	7	–	0
Iowa State	0	–	6	–	0	2	–	8	–	0
$ – Conference champion; Rankings from AP Poll

The 1956 Nebraska Cornhuskers football team was the representative of the University of Nebraska and member of the Big 7 Conference in the 1956 college football season. The team was coached by Pete Elliott and played their home games at Memorial Stadium in Lincoln, Nebraska.

== Before the season ==
Going into the season, Nebraska's sought to return to form, as the last few bright spots on the record books had been increasingly far into the past. The last season resulting in a convincing win record was 1950, where Nebraska finished 6–2–1. Prior to that, there was the 8–2–0 finish in 1940. During the ongoing low period in program history, seven-year coach Bill Glassford had stepped down and was replaced by first-time head coach Pete Elliott, previously the Backfield Coach at Oklahoma, and a former college quarterback who helped lead the 1948 Michigan Wolverines football team to a national championship. With four new assistants on the staff, Elliott set to the task of proving he could run a successful football team.

== Schedule ==
Date	Time	Opponent	Site	Result	Attendance	Source
September 22	2:00 pm	South Dakota*	Memorial Stadium; Lincoln, NE	W 34–6	30,000–31,260	
September 29	1:00 pm	at No. 8 Ohio State*	Ohio Stadium; Columbus, OH	L 7–34	82,153	
October 6	2:00 pm	Iowa State	Memorial Stadium; Lincoln, NE (rivalry)	W 9–7	30,000	
October 13	2:00 pm	Kansas State	Memorial Stadium; Lincoln, NE (rivalry)	L 7–10	24,000	
October 20	2:00 pm	Indiana*	Memorial Stadium; Lincoln, NE	L 14–19	38,000	
October 27	3:00 pm	at Colorado	Folsom Field; Boulder, CO (rivalry)	L 0–16	45,500	
November 3	2:00 pm	Missouri^{†}	Memorial Stadium; Lincoln, NE (rivalry)	W 15–14	35,000	
November 10	1:30 pm	at Kansas	Memorial Stadium; Lawrence, KS (rivalry)	W 26–20	26,422	
November 17	2:00 pm	Baylor*	Memorial Stadium; Lincoln, NE	L 7–26	31,775	
November 24	2:00 pm	at No. 1 Oklahoma	Oklahoma Memorial Stadium; Norman, OK (rivalry)	L 6–54	46,000	
*Non-conference game; ^{†}Homecoming; Rankings from AP Poll released prior to the game; Source:

== Roster ==
Official Roster
61 Adkins, Larry G (So.); 21 Arnost, John QB (Jr.); 54 Berguin, Robert C (Sr.); 40 Boroff, Claire HB (So.); 35 Brown, Jerry FB (Jr.); 80 Cook, Clarence E (So.); 31 Dillard, Bennie HB (So.); 70 Dohrman, Melvin T (So.); 87 Edwards, William E (Jr.); 81 Elacqua, John E (So.); 24 Englert, Gordon QB (Sr.); 72 English, Ernest T (So.); 25 Erway, Don QB (Sr.); 71 Fleming, Jack T; 41 Flock, WilliamDean HB (So.); 42 George, Leo HB (Jr.); 47 Greenlaw, William HB (Sr.); 38 Haman, Gene FB (Jr.); 27 Harshman, George QB (Jr.); 73 Hart, Joseph T (Jr.); 32 Hawkins, William HB (Jr.); 88 Hilding, Marlin E (Jr.); 64 Hinkle, Don G (So.); 83 Howerter, Stuart E (Jr.); 63 Jones, Larry G (Jr.); 77 Kampe, Lester T (Jr.); 50 King, Richard C (So.); 74 Kitzelman, Max T (Sr.); 79 Kleiber, Dick T (Jr.)	65 Klein, Arthur G (Jr.); 75 Klingaman, Richard T (So.); 33 Krhounek, Roger HB (So.); 82 Lee, Michael E (So.); 37 Lehr, Richard FB (Jr.); 51 Lyall, Bob C (Jr.); 30 Martin, Lyle HB (Jr.); 34 McCashland, Dick FB (So.); 84 McVay, Howard E (So.); 78 Murphy, James T (Sr.); 45 Nappi, Frank HB (Jr.); 43 Naviaux, Larry HB (So.); 76 Petersen, Jerry T (Jr.); 44 Pinkston, Darrel HB (So.); 85 Prusia, Dick E (Jr.); 68 Reeves, Franklin G (Jr.); 66 Rhoda, Donald T (Jr.); 67 Ritner, Bill G (So.); 86 Sandage, Gene E (Jr.); 52 Sapp, Guy C (So.); 46 Schoettger, Jerry HB (So.); 22 Stinnett, Roy QB (So.); 36 Thomas, Douglas HB (Jr.); 69 Torczon, LaVerne G (Sr.); 89 Tsoukalas, Charles E (So.); 62 Wheeler, Jerry G (Jr.); 56 Wollenberg, Gene C (Jr.); 55 Wood, Dewain E (Jr.); 39 Yeisley, James FB (Sr.)

== Depth Chart ==
Defense by committee
HB	HB
	LB / LB
CB	DE / DT / NT / DT / DE	CB

Offensive starters

LE
Marlin Hilding
Clarence Cook

LG	C	RG	LT	RT
LaVerne Torczon	Robert Berguin	James Murphy	Lester Kampe	Jerry Wheeler
Donald Rhoda	Max Kitzelman (injured); Dick McCashland	Arthur Klein	Jerry Petersen	Jack Fleming

RE
Michael Lee
Howard McVay

QB
Roy Stinnett
George Harshman
Gordon Englert

LB	RB	FB
William Hawkins	Larry Naviaux	Jerry Brown
Frank Nappi	William Greenlaw	Leo George

== Coaching staff ==
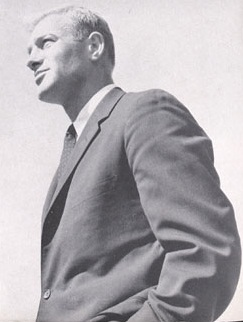
Pete Elliott, 1956

Name	Title	First year in this position	Years at Nebraska	Alma mater
Pete Elliott	Head coach	1956	1956	Michigan
L. F. "Pop" Klein	Assistant coach	1945	1945–1958	
Don Strasheim		1954	1954–1958	Nebraska
Bill Jennings	Backfield Coach	1956	1956–1961	Oklahoma
Don Scarbrough	Assistant coach	1956	1956–1961	
Dee Andros	Line Coach	1956	1956	Oklahoma
Gene Stauber	Freshman Coach	1956	1956	

== Game summaries ==
=== South Dakota ===
Team	1	2	Total
South Dakota			6
• Nebraska			34

- Date: September 22
- Location: Memorial Stadium • Lincoln, Nebraska
- Game attendance: 31,260

Coach Elliott's first game as a head coach went down as a victory as the Cornhuskers had little trouble with South Dakota in Lincoln. It was the seventh straight loss by the Coyotes to Nebraska, and the 14th straight in the series without a South Dakota Victory since their one and only win against the Cornhuskers from 1899.

=== Ohio State ===
Team	1	2	Total
Nebraska			7
• #8 Ohio State			34

- Date: September 29
- Location: Ohio Stadium • Columbus, Ohio
- Game attendance: 79,351

In front of one of the larger crowds to watch a Nebraska football game, the Cornhuskers stumbled out of the gate in Columbus and found themselves behind 0–27 by the end of the first half. Nebraska avoided the shutout only by blocking a punt and falling on the ball in the end zone to secure a single touchdown. It was only the second time these teams had met, and the Buckeyes held both victories. Ohio State would go on to finish the season 6–3–0 and ranked #15 by the AP Poll.

=== Iowa State ===
Team	1	2	Total
Iowa State			7
• Nebraska			9

- Date: October 6
- Location: Memorial Stadium • Lincoln, Nebraska
- Game attendance: 31,743

Nebraska's Big 7 season opened with the Cyclones arriving in Lincoln and bringing with them a real battle. As the game was drawing to a close, the Cornhuskers still trailed 6–7 when Nebraska PK George Harshman booted a 24-yard field goal in the final seconds to extract the win. The victory extended Nebraska's winning streak over Iowa State to 11 in a row, as the record now stood at 41–8–1.

=== Kansas State ===
Team	1	2	Total
• Kansas State			10
Nebraska			7

- Date: October 13
- Location: Memorial Stadium • Lincoln, Nebraska
- Game attendance: 30,469

Kansas State arrived in Lincoln as the underdog, and perhaps few expected the Wildcats to put up much of a fight, as the stadium was relatively empty. As expected, just five minutes into the game, Nebraska scored to set the tone of a game that seemed decided before it started. However, if the outcome was foretold, someone failed to tell the Wildcat team, as Kansas State then put up a solid defensive effort to hold off any further Nebraska scores while punching in one of their own. In a turn of fortunes from the previous week, it was a field goal that made the difference and this time handed Nebraska a defeat. Kansas State had far to go to catch up in the series, however, as this win moved them only to 7–31–2 against Nebraska all time.

=== Indiana ===
Team	1	2	Total
• Indiana			19
Nebraska			14

- Date: October 20
- Location: Memorial Stadium • Lincoln, Nebraska
- Game attendance: 37,527

Nebraska looked to be in form to bounce back from the upset loss to Kansas State the week prior, and made a statement suggesting as much when they jumped out to a 14–0 lead over the Hoosiers. Following that second touchdown, however, the game was all Indiana as the undaunted visitors rolled off an unanswered 19 straight points to hand the Cornhuskers a third loss for the season, leaving them winless in their previous nine attempts against Indiana as they fell to 3–8–3 in the series.

=== Colorado ===
Team	1	2	Total
Nebraska			0
• Colorado			16

- Date: October 27
- Location: Folsom Field • Boulder, Colorado
- Game attendance: 42,818

The Cornhuskers were handed their first shutout loss of 1956 by Colorado, whose two touchdowns and safety provided the points to break their two-game losing streak to Nebraska. The win moved the Buffaloes to 6–9–0 over the Cornhuskers all-time, and left Nebraska nursing three straight losses, with just a 1–2 record in conference play so far for the season.

=== Missouri ===
Team	1	2	Total
Missouri			14
• Nebraska			15

- Date: November 3
- Location: Memorial Stadium • Lincoln, Nebraska
- Game attendance: 34,748

Underdog Nebraska managed to create an exciting finish for the homecoming crowd at Memorial Stadium by staying within a score as time marched on. With Missouri holding onto the lead 14–9 and less than two minutes remaining, the Cornhuskers threw for a touchdown to go up by one point and snatch the victory from the Tigers. Nebraska's series lead remained comfortable at 28–18–3. This victory was the 350th all-time win for the Nebraska football team.

=== Kansas ===
Team	1	2	Total
• Nebraska			26
Kansas			20

- Date: November 10
- Location: Memorial Stadium • Lawrence, Kansas
- Game attendance: 26,422

Turning their attention to the homecoming event in Lawrence, Nebraska once again faced an opponent they were not expected to defeat. BY the end of the contest as the Jayhawks filed disappointed from the field on the wrong end of a 20–26 defeat, it may have seemed that coach Elliott had begun to figure out how to manage his football team, and that the season, now 4–4 and 3–2 in the Big 7, might be salvageable. Nebraska's win was the fifth straight in the series, and they improved to 46–13–3 over Kansas overall.

=== Baylor ===
Team	1	2	Total
• Baylor			26
Nebraska			7

- Date: November 17
- Location: Memorial Stadium • Lincoln, Nebraska
- Game attendance: 31,775

Nebraska fought a fairly even battle against the Bears until into the third quarter, when the line began to falter and allow Baylor to march down the field. The momentum of the game finally turned completely when Baylor returned a punt 91 yards for a score, and the Bears eventually pulled away by 19 points. It was the first time these teams had met since their first matchup in 1939, and the series was now tied at 1–1–0. Baylor went on to finish the season 8–2–0 and ranked #11 by the AP Poll.

=== Oklahoma ===
Team	1	2	Total
Nebraska			6
• #1 Oklahoma			54

- Date: November 24
- Location: Oklahoma Memorial Stadium • Norman, Oklahoma
- Game attendance: 50,039

The vaunted Oklahoma football powerhouse was Nebraska's final challenge of the year, and the Cornhuskers brought everything they had to bear against the Sooners. Despite their best efforts, Nebraska was fortunate to escape Norman without having suffered a shutout loss thanks to a single touchdown on a five-yard pass. Oklahoma moved to 17–16–3 against Nebraska to date, taking the lead in the series for the first time in the history of the games between these programs dating back to 1912. Oklahoma went on to finish the season undefeated at 10–0–0, Big 7 champions, and AP national champions.

== After the season ==
Coach Elliott's first season did not bring any significant change to the fortunes of the program, finishing with a losing season to extend by another year the stretch of relatively unsuccessful campaigns waged by the Cornhuskers since the dawn of the 1940s. At the conclusion of the season, Elliott announced that he had accepted the head coaching position at California, making his first Nebraska season also his last. His California tenure lasted only three years as he compiled a disappointing 10–21 record, and his last two head coaching jobs at Illinois and Miami produced only four winning seasons over nine years.

Nebraska's conference record under Elliott slipped to 146–58–12 (.704) while the overall program record fell to 351–189–34 (.641). Backfield Coach Bill Jennings was subsequently named as Elliott's successor and assumed control over the struggling Cornhusker football program.

== Future NFL and other professional league players ==
- Clarence Cook, 1957 18th-round pick of the Los Angeles Rams
- Laverne Torczon, 1957 18th-round pick of the Cleveland Browns
