= 1956 Houston Cougars football team =

American college football season

1956 Houston Cougars football

MVC champion
- Conference: Missouri Valley Conference
- Record: 7–2–1 (4–0 MVC)
- Head coach: Bill Meek (2nd season)
- Captains: Don Flynn; Ken Wind
- Home stadium: Rice Stadium

1956 Missouri Valley Conference football standings
	Conf.					Overall
Team	W		L		T	W		L		T
Houston $	4	–	0	–	0	7	–	2	–	1
Tulsa	2	–	1	–	1	7	–	2	–	1
Oklahoma A&M	2	–	1	–	1	3	–	5	–	2
Wichita	1	–	3	–	0	4	–	7	–	0
Detroit	0	–	4	–	0	2	–	8	–	0
$ – Conference champion

The 1956 Houston Cougars football team was an American football team that represented the University of Houston in the Missouri Valley Conference (MVC) during the 1956 college football season. In its second and final season under head coach Bill Meek, the team compiled a 7–2–1 record (4–0 against conference opponents) and won the MVC championship. Don Flynn and Ken Wind were the team captains. The team played its home games at Rice Stadium in Houston.

== Schedule ==
Date	Opponent	Site	Result	Attendance	Source
September 29	Mississippi State*	Rice Stadium; Houston, TX	W 18–7	56,000	
October 6	at No. 6 Ole Miss*	Mississippi Veterans Memorial Stadium; Jackson, MS	L 0–14	25,000–26,000	
October 13	No. 9 Texas A&M*^{†}	Rice Stadium; Houston, TX	T 14–14	67,009	
October 20	at Oklahoma A&M	Lewis Field; Stillwater, OK	W 13–0	25,000	
October 27	at Auburn*	Cliff Hare Stadium; Auburn, AL	L 0–12	20,000	
November 3	at Wichita	Veterans Field; Wichita, KS	W 41–16	11,193	
November 10	Tulsa	Rice Stadium; Houston, TX	W 14–0	20,000	
November 17	Villanova*	Rice Stadium; Houston, TX	W 26–13	15,000	
November 24	at Texas Tech*	Jones Stadium; Lubbock, TX (rivalry)	W 20–7	15,500	
December 1	Detroit	Rice Stadium; Houston, TX	W 39–7	10,000	
*Non-conference game; ^{†}Homecoming; Rankings from AP Poll released prior to the game
