= Les Luymes =

American football coach (1920–1996)

Biographical details
- Born: June 22, 1920; Iowa, U.S.
- Died: June 5, 1996 (aged 75); Newport Beach, California, U.S.

Coaching career (HC unless noted)

Football
- 1951–1955: St. Cloud State
- 1956: North Dakota State

Basketball
- 1950–1954: St. Cloud State

Administrative career (AD unless noted)
- 1956–1963: North Dakota State

Head coaching record
- Overall: 34–15 (football); 50–37 (basketball)

Accomplishments and honors

Championships
- Football; 5 MSCC (1951–1955)

Luverne Leslie Luymes (June 22, 1920 – June 5, 1996) was an American college football and college basketball coach and athletics administrator. He served as the head football coach at St. Cloud State University from 1951 to 1955 and at North Dakota State University in 1956, compiling a career college football head coaching record of 34–15. Luymes was also the head basketball coach at St. Cloud State from 1950 to 1954, tallying a mark of 50–37.

== Head coaching record ==
=== Football ===
| Year | Team | Overall | Conference | Standing | Bowl/playoffs |
|---|---|---|---|---|---|
St. Cloud State Huskies (Minnesota State College Conference) (1951–1955)
| 1951 | St. Cloud State | 5–2 | 4–0 | 1st | |
| 1952 | St. Cloud State | 5–4 | 3–1 | T–1st | |
| 1953 | St. Cloud State | 6–1 | 4–0 | 1st | |
| 1954 | St. Cloud State | 5–3 | 4–0 | 1st | |
| 1955 | St. Cloud State | 8–1 | 4–0 | 1st | |
| St. Cloud State: | | 29–11 | 19–1 | | |
North Dakota State Bison (North Central Conference) (1956)
| 1956 | North Dakota State | 5–4 | 3–3 | T–4th | |
| North Dakota State: | | 5–4 | 3–3 | | |
| Total: | | 34–15 | | | |
National championship Conference title Conference division title or championship game berth
