= Gene Harlow =

American football player and coach (1919–1998)

Biographical details
- Born: March 8, 1919; Alabama, U.S.
- Died: December 31, 1998 (aged 79); Wake County, North Carolina, U.S.

Playing career
- 1939–1940: Vanderbilt
- Positions: Fullback, guard

Coaching career (HC unless noted)
- 1945: Alabama (assistant)
- 1946–1950: Idaho (assistant)
- 1951: Oregon (line)
- 1952–1953: Tulane (line)
- 1954: Murphy HS (AL) (line)
- 1955–1957: Arkansas State

Head coaching record
- Overall: 15–12

Gene Mitchell Harlow (March 8, 1919 – December 31, 1998) was an American football player and coach. He served as the head football coach at Arkansas State College, now Arkansas State University, from 1955 to 1957, compiling a record of 15–12.

He is buried in Florence, Alabama.

== Head coaching record ==
Year	Team	Overall	Conference	Standing	Bowl/playoffs
Arkansas State Indians (Independent) (1955–1957)
1955	Arkansas State	6–3			
1956	Arkansas State	5–4			
1957	Arkansas State	4–5			
Arkansas State:		15–12			
Total:		15–12			
