= 1956 South Dakota State Jackrabbits football team =

American college football season

1956 South Dakota State Jackrabbits football
- Conference: North Central Conference
- Record: 4–5 (3–3 NCC)
- Head coach: Ralph Ginn (10th season)
- Home stadium: State Field

1956 North Central Conference football standings
	Conf.					Overall
Team	W		L		T	W		L		T
Morningside $	4	–	1	–	1	6	–	1	–	1
Augustana (SD)	4	–	2	–	0	6	–	3	–	0
South Dakota	4	–	2	–	0	4	–	4	–	0
North Dakota State	3	–	3	–	0	5	–	4	–	0
South Dakota State	3	–	3	–	0	4	–	5	–	0
North Dakota	2	–	4	–	0	2	–	6	–	0
Iowa State Teachers	0	–	5	–	1	2	–	5	–	1
$ – Conference champion

The 1956 South Dakota State Jackrabbits football team was an American football team that represented South Dakota State University in the North Central Conference during the 1956 college football season. In its tenth season under head coach Ralph Ginn, the team compiled a 4–5 record, finished in a tie for fourth place out of seven teams in the NCC, and was outscored by a total of 212 to 137.

== Schedule ==
Date	Opponent	Site	Result	Attendance	Source
September 15	at Montana State*	Great Falls, MT	L 14–33		
September 22	Northwest Missouri State*	State Field; Brookings, SD	W 7–0		
September 29	Arizona*	Arizona Stadium; Tucson, AZ	L 0–60	16,000	
October 6	Augustana (SD)	State Field; Brookings, SD	L 20–21	6,800	
October 13	North Dakota	State Field; Brookings, SD	W 14–13		
October 20	at South Dakota	Vermillion, SD (Dakota Day, rivalry)	L 14–19	7,000	
October 27	at North Dakota State	Dacotah Field; Fargo, ND (rivalry)	L 9–26		
November 3	Morningside	State Field; Brookings, SD	W 28–13		
November 10	Iowa State Teachers	Latham Stadium; Cedar Falls, IA	W 31–27		
*Non-conference game
