= 1956 North Dakota State Bison football team =

American college football season

1956 North Dakota State Bison football
- Conference: North Central Conference
- Record: 5–4 (3–3 NCC)
- Head coach: Les Luymes (1st season)
- Home stadium: Dacotah Field

1956 North Central Conference football standings
	Conf.					Overall
Team	W		L		T	W		L		T
Morningside $	4	–	1	–	1	6	–	1	–	1
Augustana (SD)	4	–	2	–	0	6	–	3	–	0
South Dakota	4	–	2	–	0	4	–	4	–	0
North Dakota State	3	–	3	–	0	5	–	4	–	0
South Dakota State	3	–	3	–	0	4	–	5	–	0
North Dakota	2	–	4	–	0	2	–	6	–	0
Iowa State Teachers	0	–	5	–	1	2	–	5	–	1
$ – Conference champion

The 1956 North Dakota State Bison football team was an American football team that represented North Dakota State University during the 1956 college football season as a member of the North Central Conference. In their only year under head coach Les Luymes, the team compiled a 5–4 record.

== Schedule ==
Date	Opponent	Site	Result	Source
September 11	Valley City State*	Dacotah Field; Fargo, ND	W 25–0	
September 15	Concordia–Moorhead*	Dacotah Field; Fargo, ND	W 12–7	
September 22	Augustana (SD)	Dacotah Field; Fargo, ND	W 42–7	
October 6	Morningside	Dacotah Field; Fargo, ND	L 3–10	
October 13	at Missouri*	Memorial Stadium; Columbia, MO	L 0–42	
October 20	at North Dakota	Memorial Stadium; Grand Forks, ND (Nickel Trophy)	L 7–14	
October 27	South Dakota State^{†}	Dacotah Field; Fargo, ND (rivalry)	W 26–9	
November 10	at South Dakota	Inman Field; Vermillion, SD	L 7–13	
November 17	at Iowa State Teachers	O. R. Latham Stadium; Cedar Falls, IA	W 19–13	
*Non-conference game; ^{†}Homecoming
