= 1956 Toledo Rockets football team =

American college football season

1956 Toledo Rockets football
- Conference: Mid-American Conference
- Record: 1–7–1 (1–5 MAC)
- Head coach: Jack Morton (1st season)
- Home stadium: Glass Bowl

1956 Mid-American Conference football standings
	Conf.					Overall
Team	W		L		T	W		L		T
Bowling Green $	5	–	0	–	1	8	–	0	–	1
Miami (OH)	4	–	0	–	1	7	–	1	–	1
Kent State	4	–	2	–	0	7	–	2	–	0
Marshall	2	–	4	–	0	3	–	6	–	0
Ohio	2	–	4	–	0	2	–	7	–	0
Western Michigan	1	–	4	–	0	2	–	7	–	0
Toledo	1	–	5	–	0	1	–	7	–	1
$ – Conference champion

The 1956 Toledo Rockets football team was an American football team that represented Toledo University in the Mid-American Conference (MAC) during the 1956 college football season. In their first and only season under head coach Jack Morton, the Rockets compiled a 1–7–1 record (1–5 against MAC opponents), finished in seventh place in the MAC, and were outscored by their opponents by a combined total of 250 to 118.

The team's statistical leaders included Sam Tisci with 354 passing yards, Don Wright with 498 rushing yards, and Dan Howell with 218 receiving yards.

== Schedule ==
Date	Opponent	Site	Result
September 15	Eastern Kentucky*	Glass Bowl; Toledo, OH	L 6–12
September 22	Louisville*	Glass Bowl; Toledo, OH	L 12–27
September 29	at Ohio	Peden Stadium; Athens, OH	W 19–13
October 6	Miami (OH)	Glass Bowl; Toledo, OH	L 14–33
October 13	at Western Michigan	Waldo Stadium; Kalamazoo, MI	L 15–26
October 20	Bowling Green	Glass Bowl; Toledo, OH (rivalry)	L 12–34
November 3	at Kent State	Memorial Stadium; Kent, OH	L 6–52
November 9	at Marshall	Fairfield Stadium; Huntington, WV	L 13–32
November 17	Brandeis*	Glass Bowl; Toledo, OH	T 21–21
*Non-conference game
