= 1956 West Texas State Buffaloes football team =

American college football season

1956 West Texas State Buffaloes football

Tangerine Bowl champion

Tangerine Bowl, W 20–13 vs. Mississippi Southern
- Conference: Border Conference
- Record: 8–2 (2–2 Border)
- Head coach: Frank Kimbrough (10th season)
- Home stadium: Buffalo Stadium

1956 Border Conference football standings
	Conf.					Overall
Team	W		L		T	W		L		T
Texas Western $	5	–	0	–	0	9	–	2	–	0
Arizona State	3	–	1	–	0	9	–	1	–	0
West Texas State	2	–	2	–	0	8	–	2	–	0
Arizona	1	–	2	–	0	4	–	6	–	0
Hardin–Simmons	1	–	3	–	0	4	–	6	–	0
New Mexico A&M	0	–	4	–	0	1	–	9	–	0
$ – Conference champion

The 1956 West Texas State Buffaloes football team was an American football team that represented West Texas State College (now known as West Texas A&M University) in the Border Conference during the 1956 college football season. In their tenth season under head coach Frank Kimbrough, the Buffaloes compiled an 8–2 record (2–2 against conference opponents), finished in third place in the conference, defeated Mississippi Southern in the 1957 Tangerine Bowl, and outscored all opponents 296 to 96. West Texas State played home games at Buffalo Stadium in Canyon, Texas.

The Buffaloes averaged 29.6 points per game. The team's statistical leaders included Bubba Hillman with 357 passing yards, Ron Mills with 569 rushing yards, Ken Ballard with 125 receiving yards, and Charles Sanders with 12 touchdowns.

== Schedule ==
Date	Opponent	Site	Result	Attendance	Source
September 15	Corpus Christi*	Buffalo Stadium; Canyon, TX	W 29–6		
September 22	McMurry*	Buffalo Stadium; Canyon, TX	W 33–7	5,500	
September 29	Sul Ross*	Buffalo Stadium; Canyon, TX	W 48–0		
October 13	at Texas Tech*	Jones Stadium; Lubbock, TX	W 34–14	20,500	
October 20	New Mexico A&M	Buffalo Stadium; Canyon, TX	W 45–0		
November 3	at Arizona	Arizona Stadium; Tucson, AZ	L 13–20	16,000	
November 10	at Hardin–Simmons	Parramore Stadium; Abilene, TX	W 20–6		
November 17	Texas Western^{†}	Buffalo Stadium; Canyon, TX	L 13–16	7,000	
December 1	at Midwestern (TX)*	Coyote Stadium; Wichita Falls, TX	W 41–14	1,000	
January 1, 1957	vs. Mississippi Southern*	Orlando, FL (Tangerine Bowl)	W 20–13	12,000	
*Non-conference game; ^{†}Homecoming
