= 1956 Iowa State Cyclones football team =

American college football season

1956 Iowa State Cyclones football
- Conference: Big Seven Conference
- Record: 2–8 (0–6 Big 7)
- Head coach: Vince DiFrancesca (3rd season)
- Captains: Chuck Muelhaupt; Oliver Sparks
- Home stadium: Clyde Williams Field

1956 Big Seven Conference football standings
| | Conf. | | | | | Overall |
| Team | W | | L | | T | W | | L | | T |
|---|---|---|---|---|---|---|---|---|---|---|
| No. 1 Oklahoma $ | 6 | – | 0 | – | 0 | 10 | – | 0 | – | 0 |
| No. 20 Colorado | 4 | – | 1 | – | 1 | 8 | – | 2 | – | 1 |
| Missouri | 3 | – | 2 | – | 1 | 4 | – | 5 | – | 1 |
| Nebraska | 3 | – | 3 | – | 0 | 4 | – | 6 | – | 0 |
| Kansas | 2 | – | 4 | – | 0 | 3 | – | 6 | – | 1 |
| Kansas State | 2 | – | 4 | – | 0 | 3 | – | 7 | – | 0 |
| Iowa State | 0 | – | 6 | – | 0 | 2 | – | 8 | – | 0 |
$ – Conference champion; Rankings from AP Poll

The 1956 Iowa State Cyclones football team represented Iowa State College of Agricultural and Mechanic Arts (later renamed Iowa State University) in the Big Seven Conference during the 1956 college football season. In their third and final year under head coach Vince DiFrancesca, the Cyclones compiled a 2–8 record (0–6 against conference opponents), finished in last place in the conference, and were outscored by their opponents by a combined total of 260 to 92. They played their home games at Clyde Williams Field in Ames, Iowa.

The team's regular starting lineup on offense consisted of left end Brian Dennis, left tackle Oliver Sparks, left guard Ron Bredeson, center Frank Powell, right guard Ralph Losee, right tackle Andris Poncius, right end Gale Gibson, quarterback Charles Martin, left halfback Jack Hansen, right halfback Bob Harden, and fullback Marv Walter. Chuck Muelhaupt and Oliver Sparks were the team captains.

The team's statistical leaders included Bob Harden with 244 rushing yards and 24 points (four touchdowns), Phil Hill with 205 passing yards, and John Scheldrup with 140 receiving yards. No Iowa State players were selected as first-team all-conference players.

== Schedule ==
| Date | Time | Opponent | Site | Result | Attendance | Source |
|---|---|---|---|---|---|---|
| September 15 | 9:00 pm | at Denver* | DU Stadium; Denver, CO | W 13–10 | 14,126 | |
| September 29 | 12:30 pm | at Northwestern* | Dyche Stadium; Evanston, IL | L 13–14 | 31,108 | |
| October 6 | 2:00 pm | at Nebraska | Memorial Stadium; Lincoln, NE (rivalry) | L 7–9 | 30,000 | |
| October 13 | 2:00 pm | Kansas | Clyde Williams Field; Ames, IA | L 14–25 | 10,000 | |
| October 20 | 2:00 pm | Colorado^{†} | Clyde Williams Field; Ames, IA | L 0–52 | 16,000 | |
| October 27 | 1:30 pm | at Missouri | Memorial Stadium; Columbia, MO (rivalry) | L 0–34 | 17,200 | |
| November 3 | 2:00 pm | Drake* | Clyde Williams Field; Ames, IA | W 39–14 | 8,140 | |
| November 10 | 2:00 pm | No. 1 Oklahoma | Clyde Williams Field; Ames, IA | L 0–44 | 14,000 | |
| November 17 | 1:30 pm | at Kansas State | Memorial Stadium; Manhattan, KS (rivalry) | L 6–32 | 12,000 | |
| November 24 | 12:30 pm | at Villanova* | Villanova Stadium; Villanova, PA | L 0–26 | 5,000 | |
*Non-conference game; ^{†}Homecoming; Rankings from AP Poll released prior to the game; All times are in Central time; Source:
