= 1956 Iowa State Teachers Panthers football team =

American college football season

1956 Iowa State Teachers Panthers football
- Conference: North Central Conference
- Record: 2–5–1 (0–5–1 NCC)
- Head coach: Clyde Starbeck (19th season)
- Home stadium: O. R. Latham Stadium

1956 North Central Conference football standings
	Conf.					Overall
Team	W		L		T	W		L		T
Morningside $	4	–	1	–	1	6	–	1	–	1
Augustana (SD)	4	–	2	–	0	6	–	3	–	0
South Dakota	4	–	2	–	0	4	–	4	–	0
North Dakota State	3	–	3	–	0	5	–	4	–	0
South Dakota State	3	–	3	–	0	4	–	5	–	0
North Dakota	2	–	4	–	0	2	–	6	–	0
Iowa State Teachers	0	–	5	–	1	2	–	5	–	1
$ – Conference champion

The 1956 Iowa State Teachers Panthers football team was an American football team that represented Iowa State Teachers College (later renamed University of Northern Iowa) as a member of the North Central Conference (NCC) during the 1956 college football season. In their 19th season under head coach Clyde Starbeck, the Panthers compiled a 2–5–1 record (0–5–1 in conference games) and finished in last place in the NCC.

Guard Dick Formanek was named to the all-NCC team.

The team played its home games at O. R. Latham Stadium in Cedar Falls, Iowa.

== Schedule ==
Date	Opponent	Site	Result	Attendance	Source
September 29	Drake*	O. R. Latham Stadium; Cedar Falls, IA	W 20–0	5,600	
October 6	Northeast Missouri State*	O. R. Latham Stadium; Cedar Falls, IA	W 44–26		
October 13	at Augustana (SD)	Sioux Falls, SD	L 6–13		
October 20	Morningside	O. R. Latham Stadium; Cedar Falls, IA	T 20–20	4,500	
October 27	at North Dakota	Memorial Stadium; Grand Forks, ND	L 19–20		
November 3	at South Dakota	Inman Field; Vermillion, SD	L 19–20		
November 10	South Dakota State	O. R. Latham Stadium; Cedar Falls, IA	L 27–31		
November 17	North Dakota State	O. R. Latham Stadium; Cedar Falls, IA	L 13–19		
*Non-conference game
