= Chuck Mather =

American football coach

Biographical details
- Born: April 17, 1915; Steubenville, Ohio, U.S.
- Died: May 20, 2006 (aged 91); Wilmette, Illinois, U.S.
- Education: Ohio Northern University

Coaching career (HC unless noted)
- 1940–1941: Leetonia HS (OH)
- 1946–1947: Hamilton HS (OH)
- 1948–1953: Massillon Washington HS (OH)
- 1954–1957: Kansas
- 1958–1965: Chicago Bears (backfield)

Head coaching record
- Overall: 11–26–3 (college); 109–19–5 (high school)

Accomplishments and honors

Awards
- Big Eight Coach of the Year (1957)

Charles V. Mather (April 17, 1915 – May 20, 2006) was an American football coach. He served as the head football coach at the University of Kansas from 1954 until 1957, compiling a record of 11–26–3.

Mather attended Hopedale High School in Ohio, where he played baseball and basketball, then graduated from Ohio Northern University with a degree in education in 1937. He received a partial athletic scholarship to attend the school, and signed up to play football as a freshman, though he did not start in a game until his senior year.

After graduating, Mather was the head coach at Brilliant High School, then Leetonia High School, where he stayed until he was called into military service in 1942. In 1945, he returned for one final season at Leetonia, then worked at Hamilton High School. Future baseball player Joe Nuxhall was a player on his team at Hamilton. In 1948, Mather left Hamilton to become the head coach at Massillon Washington High School, where he led the team to six state championship titles and only three career losses. At Massilon, he coached Don James, who started his coaching career under Mather at Kansas as a graduate assistant. James was later a head coach at Kent State (1971–1974) and the University of Washington (1975–1992).

In 1952, Mather received a Master of Arts from Kent State University.

In 1954, Mather accepted the head football coach position at the University of Kansas, where he also taught in the Physical Education department. Rather than hiring a new coaching staff, he brought his staff from Massillon to KU, where he would coach at KU until 1957, when he resigned. In his final year of coaching, he was named the Big Eight Coach of the Year. He was then recruited by Chicago Bears coach George Halas and hired as an backfield assistant coach for the team. He is remembered for innovating the practices and techniques of the team, advocating for the hiring of defensive coach George Allen, and ultimately contributing to the Bears' 1963 championship win.

In 1955, Mather published Winning High School Football: Organization and Strategy for the High School Coach. He received a Distinguished Alumni Award from Ohio Northern University in 1987.

== Head coaching record ==
=== College ===
Year	Team	Overall	Conference	Standing	Bowl/playoffs
Kansas Jayhawks (Big Seven Conference) (1954–1957)
1954	Kansas	0–10	0–6	7th	
1955	Kansas	3–6–1	1–4–1	T–5th	
1956	Kansas	3–6–1	2–4	T–5th	
1957	Kansas	5–4–1	4–2	2nd	
Kansas:		11–26–3	7–16–1		
Total:		11–26–3			
