= Dallas Ward =

American football player and coach

- Ward as head coach at Colorado

Biographical details
- Born: August 11, 1906; Lexington, Oregon, U.S.
- Died: February 15, 1983 (aged 76); Boulder, Colorado, U.S.

Playing career
- 1924–1926: Oregon State
- Position: End

Coaching career (HC unless noted)
- 1936–1941: Minnesota (assistant)
- 1942: Iowa Pre-Flight (assistant)
- 1945–1947: Minnesota (backfield)
- 1948–1958: Colorado
- 1962: Colorado (defense)

Head coaching record
- Overall: 63–41–6
- Bowls: 1–0

Accomplishments and honors

Awards
- Big Eight Coach of the Year (1956)
- Military career
- Allegiance: United States
- Branch: United States Navy
- Rank: Commander
- Unit: Training
- Conflicts: World War II

Dallas Carl Ward (August 11, 1906 – February 15, 1983) was an American football, basketball, and baseball player and coach. He was the head football coach at the University of Colorado in Boulder from 1948 to 1958, compiling a career record of 63–41–6 in eleven seasons. Over the course of the 1953 and 1954 seasons, Ward's Buffaloes won nine consecutive games.

Ward grew up in northeastern Oregon on a ranch near Lexington and played college football at Oregon Agricultural College in Corvallis in the 1920s, where he started every game of his collegiate career.

Ward held membership in five honorary societies, including Phi Kappa Phi, and was inducted into the Colorado Sports Hall of Fame in 1985. The CU athletic administration center, located at the north end of Folsom Field, was named after him. As of 2007, Ward is one of only three multi-sport inductees in the hall of fame at Oregon State, where he was inducted in 1997. He earned eight varsity letters: three for football and twice each for baseball and basketball, and was a captain in all three sports.

== Coaching career ==
After graduation from Oregon State, Ward taught in Minneapolis and became head coach at Marshall High in 1928, helped with a letter of recommendation written by Knute Rockne. In 1936, he joined the staff at the University of Minnesota as an assistant coach. During World War II, Ward served as officer-in-charge of physical and military training at the U.S. Naval Air Station in Dallas, Texas. After the war, he returned to Minnesota as backfield coach.

Ward became the head coach at Colorado in 1948, succeeding James J. Yeager. In his first two seasons, his teams won three games each for a 6–13 record, but those were his only losing seasons. Following the 1956 regular season, his team won the Orange Bowl, Colorado's second (1938 Cotton Bowl being their first) bowl game, over Clemson, 27–21. After winning the season-ending bowl game, Ward was offered the head coaching positions at USC and Minnesota, but declined those offers, believing the next few years with the Buffaloes would be even better.

However, they did not turn out as hoped, and, on January 23, 1959, Ward was asked to resign by the university regents but refused. The regents reconsidered their actions, but amid many letters of protest mailed in, the original decision was kept and Ward was fired. Although no official reason was stated, it was widely believed Ward was relieved because of his inability to defeat Oklahoma; his career record against the Sooners was 0–8–1, with the tie in 1952 in Boulder in the season opener, earning him UPI Coach of the Week honors. He retired from coaching after his firing, then returned for one season in 1962, as a defensive coach on the staff of interim head coach Bud Davis.

Ward is credited with bringing the Colorado Buffaloes football program to national prominence in the 1950s. As of 2007, Ward is ranked third at Colorado in total number of games coached, fourth in total wins, and sixth in conference wins.

== Later life and death ==
Ward had earned tenure as a CU faculty member in 1956. He chose to stay at Colorado and teach. He and his wife Jane and their five children remained in Boulder, where he died of cancer at age 76 in 1983.

== Head coaching record ==
Year	Team	Overall	Conference	Standing	Bowl/playoffs	Coaches^{#}	AP^{°}
Colorado Buffaloes (Big Seven Conference) (1948–1958)
1948	Colorado	3–6	2–3	4th			
1949	Colorado	3–7	1–4	6th			
1950	Colorado	5–4–1	2–4	6th			
1951	Colorado	7–3	5–1	2nd			
1952	Colorado	6–2–2	2–2–2	T–4th			
1953	Colorado	6–4	2–4	T–4th			
1954	Colorado	7–2–1	3–2–1	T–3rd			
1955	Colorado	6–4	3–3	T–3rd			
1956	Colorado	8–2–1	4–1–1	2nd	W Orange	18	20
1957	Colorado	6–3–1	3–3	T–3rd			
1958	Colorado	6–4	4–2	3rd			
Colorado:		63–41–6	31–29–4				
Total:		63–41–6					
^{#}Rankings from final Coaches Poll.; ^{°}Rankings from final AP Poll.
