= 1956 Oklahoma A&M Cowboys football team =

American college football season

1956 Oklahoma A&M Cowboys football
- Conference: Missouri Valley Conference
- Record: 3–5–2 (2–1–1 MVC)
- Head coach: Cliff Speegle (2nd season)
- Home stadium: Lewis Field

1956 Missouri Valley Conference football standings
	Conf.					Overall
Team	W		L		T	W		L		T
Houston $	4	–	0	–	0	7	–	2	–	1
Tulsa	2	–	1	–	1	7	–	2	–	1
Oklahoma A&M	2	–	1	–	1	3	–	5	–	2
Wichita	1	–	3	–	0	4	–	7	–	0
Detroit	0	–	4	–	0	2	–	8	–	0
$ – Conference champion

The 1956 Oklahoma A&M Cowboys football team represented Oklahoma A&M College in the 1956 college football season. This was the 56th year of football at A&M and the second under Cliff Speegle. The Cowboys played their home games at Lewis Field in Stillwater, Oklahoma. They finished the season 3–5–2, 2–1–1 in their final season in the Missouri Valley Conference.

== Schedule ==
Date	Opponent	Site	Result	Attendance	Source
September 22	at Kansas State*	Memorial Stadium; Manhattan KS	W 27–7	15,000	
September 29	at Arkansas*	War Memorial Stadium; Little Rock, AR	L 7–19	32,000	
October 6	at Wichita	Veterans Field; Wichita, KS	W 32–6	16,941	
October 13	at Tulsa	Skelly Stadium; Tulsa, OK (rivalry)	T 14–14	19,391	
October 20	Houston^{†}	Lewis Field; Stillwater, OK	L 0–13	25,000	
October 26	Kansas*	Lewis Field; Stillwater, OK	L 13–21	14,000	
November 3	at Texas Tech*	Jones Stadium; Lubbock, TX	T 13–13	17,000	
November 10	at LSU*	Tiger Stadium; Baton Rouge, LA	L 0–13	22,000	
November 17	Detroit	Lewis Field; Stillwater, OK	W 25–7	10,000	
December 1	at No. 1 Oklahoma*	Lewis Field; Stillwater, OK (Bedlam Series)	L 0–53	36,500	
*Non-conference game; ^{†}Homecoming; Rankings from AP Poll released prior to the game; Source:

== After the season ==
The 1957 NFL draft was held on January 31, 1957. The following Cowboy was selected.

Round	Pick	Player	Position	NFL club
13	149	Dwaine Underwood	Tackle	Pittsburgh Steelers
