= 1956 Notre Dame Fighting Irish football team =

American college football season

1956 Notre Dame Fighting Irish football
- Conference: Independent
- Record: 2–8
- Head coach: Terry Brennan (3rd season)
- Captain: Jim Morse
- Home stadium: Notre Dame Stadium

1956 Midwestern major college football independents records
	Conf.			Overall
Team	W	L	T	W		L		T
Cincinnati		–		4	–	5	–	0
Dayton		–		4	–	6	–	0
Drake		–		3	–	6	–	0
Notre Dame		–		2	–	8	–	0
Marquette		–		0	–	9	–	0

The 1956 Notre Dame Fighting Irish football team was an American football team that represented the University of Notre Dame as an independent during the 1956 college football season. In their third year under head coach Terry Brennan, the Fighting Irish compiled a 2–8 record and were outscored by a total of 289 to 130. It was Notre Dame's first losing season since 1933 and is tied with the 1960 season as the worst winning percentage in program history.

Senior halfback Paul Hornung played on offense, defense, and special teams, leading the team in rushing (420 yards, 4.5-yard average), passing (917 yards, .532 percentage), scoring (56 points, 7 touchdowns, 14 PAT), punting (33 punts, 37.6-yard average), kickoff returns (16 returns for 496 yards), and passes broken up (7). He won the Heisman Trophy and is the only player to receive the trophy while playing on a losing team. Back Jim Morse led the team in receiving (20 catches for 442 yards) and was the team captain.

The team played its home games at Notre Dame Stadium in Notre Dame, Indiana.

== Schedule ==
Date	Opponent	Rank	Site	Result	Attendance	Source
September 22	at SMU	No. 3	Cotton Bowl; Dallas, TX	L 13–19	61,000	
October 6	Indiana	No. 17	Notre Dame Stadium; Notre Dame, IN	W 20–6	58,372	
October 13	Purdue	No. 18	Notre Dame Stadium; Notre Dame, IN (rivalry)	L 14–28	58,778	
October 20	No. 2 Michigan State		Notre Dame Stadium; Notre Dame, IN (rivalry)	L 14–47	59,378	
October 27	No. 2 Oklahoma		Notre Dame Stadium; Notre Dame, IN	L 0–40	60,128	
November 3	at Navy		Memorial Stadium; Baltimore, MD (rivalry)	L 7–33	57,773	
November 10	at No. 20 Pittsburgh		Pitt Stadium; Pittsburgh, PA (rivalry)	L 13–26	58,697	
November 17	North Carolina		Notre Dame Stadium; Notre Dame, IN (rivalry)	W 21–14	56,793	
November 24	at No. 3 Iowa		Iowa Stadium; Iowa City, IA	L 8–48	56,632	
December 1	at No. 17 USC		Los Angeles Memorial Coliseum; Los Angeles, CA (rivalry)	L 20–28	64,538	
Rankings from AP Poll released prior to the game; Source:

== Awards and honors ==
Paul Hornung, Heisman Trophy

== 1957 NFL draft ==
The following Notre Dame players were selected in the 1957 NFL draft.

Player	Position	Round	Pick	Franchise
Paul Hornung	HB	1	1	Green Bay Packers
Ed Sullivan	C	12	135	Green Bay Packers
Jim Morse	HB	13	148	Green Bay Packers
Byron Beams	T	20	232	Los Angeles Rams

== Personnel ==
=== Players ===
- Byron Beams, tackle
- Kevin Burke, center
- Larry Cooke, quarterback
- Al Ecuyer, guard
- Bob Gaydos, guard
- Frank Geremia, tackle
- Gene Hedrick, guard
- Paul Hornung, left halfback
- Jim Just, fullbackk
- Aubrey Lewis, halfback
- Chuck Lima, back
- Jim Morse, right halfback
- Angelo Mosca, guard
- Bronko Nagurski Jr., tackle
- Nick Pietrosante
- Dick Royer, end
- Jim Schaaf, guard
- Ed Sullivan, center
- Bob Ward, right halfback
- Bob Wetoska, end
- Bob Williams, quarterback

=== Coaching staff ===
- Head coach: Terry Brennan
- Assistant coaches: Jim Finks, Jack Zilly, Bill Fischer, Bernie Witucki
- Freshman coach: John Warren "Jack" Landry
- Athletic director: Edward W. "Moose" Krause
- Head trainer: Gene Paszkiet
- Equipment manager: Jack McAllister
