= 1956 North Dakota Fighting Sioux football team =

American college football season

1956 North Dakota Fighting Sioux football
- Conference: North Central Conference
- Record: 2–6 (2–4 NCC)
- Head coach: Frank Zazula (7th season)
- Home stadium: Memorial Stadium

1956 North Central Conference football standings
	Conf.					Overall
Team	W		L		T	W		L		T
Morningside $	4	–	1	–	1	6	–	1	–	1
Augustana (SD)	4	–	2	–	0	6	–	3	–	0
South Dakota	4	–	2	–	0	4	–	4	–	0
North Dakota State	3	–	3	–	0	5	–	4	–	0
South Dakota State	3	–	3	–	0	4	–	5	–	0
North Dakota	2	–	4	–	0	2	–	6	–	0
Iowa State Teachers	0	–	5	–	1	2	–	5	–	1
$ – Conference champion

The 1956 North Dakota Fighting Sioux football team, also known as the Nodaks, was an American football team that represented the University of North Dakota in the North Central Conference (NCC) during the 1956 college football season. In its seventh year under head coach Frank Zazula, the team compiled a 2–6 record (2–4 against NCC opponents), finished in sixth place out of seven teams in the NCC, and outscored opponents by a total of 158 to 110. The team played its home games at Memorial Stadium in Grand Forks, North Dakota.

== Schedule ==
Date	Opponent	Site	Result	Attendance	Source
September 15	Superior State	Memorial Stadium; Grand Forks, ND	L 19–20		
September 22	Montana State	Memorial Stadium; Grand Forks, ND	L 13–33		
September 29	at Morningside	Public Schools Stadium; Sioux City, IA	L 3–7		
October 6	South Dakota	Memorial Stadium; Grand Forks, ND (rivalry)	L 14–32		
October 13	at South Dakota State	Brookings, SD	L 13–14		
October 20	North Dakota State	Memorial Stadium; Grand Forks, ND (rivalry)	W 14–7		
October 27	Iowa State Teachers	Memorial Stadium; Grand Forks, ND	W 20–19		
November 3	at Augustana (SD)	Sioux Falls, SD	L 14–26		
