= DeWitt Weaver =

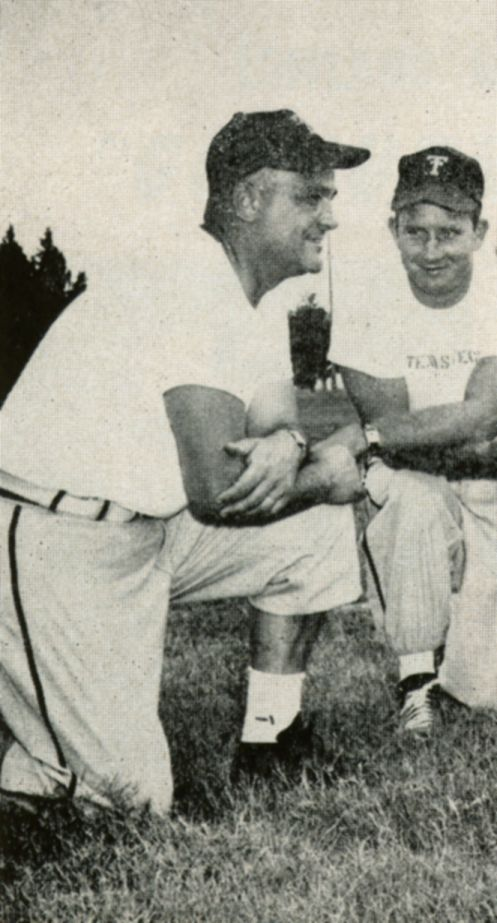
- Weaver (left) in 1955

Biographical details
- Born: May 11, 1912; Nashville, Tennessee, U.S.
- Died: January 19, 1998 (aged 85); Daphne, Alabama, U.S.

Playing career
- 1934–1936: Tennessee
- Position: Guard

Coaching career (HC unless noted)
- 1938–1941: Centre (line)
- 1946–1948: Mississippi State (line)
- 1949–1950: Tulsa (assistant)
- 1951–1960: Texas Tech

Administrative career (AD unless noted)
- 1952–1960: Texas Tech
- 1969–1972: Missouri Valley Conference (commissioner)

Head coaching record
- Overall: 49–51–5
- Bowls: 2–1

Accomplishments and honors

Championships
- 4 Border (1951, 1953–1955)

DeWitt Thompson Weaver Sr. (May 11, 1912 – January 19, 1998) was an American football player, coach, and college athletics administrator. He served as the head football coach of the Texas Tech Red Raiders from 1951 to 1960.

He was the first head football coach at Texas Tech to win a bowl game during his first season—an accomplishment unmatched at Texas Tech until Tommy Tuberville's first season, in 2010.

In 1955, he became the first college coach to defeat the Texas Longhorns in a season-opener in Austin. He amassed a 49–51–5 record.

From 1952 to 1960, he also served as the athletic director at Texas Technological College, as Texas Tech University was then known.

From 1969 to 1972, he was commissioner of the Missouri Valley Conference.

His son, DeWitt Jr., was a professional golfer who won the PGA Tour twice.

== Head coaching record ==
Year	Team	Overall	Conference	Standing	Bowl/playoffs	Coaches^{#}	AP^{°}
Texas Tech Red Raiders (Border Conference) (1951–1955)
1951	Texas Tech	7–4	4–0	1st	W Sun		
1952	Texas Tech	3–7–1	2–1–1	2nd			
1953	Texas Tech	11–1	5–0	1st	W Gator	12	12
1954	Texas Tech	7–2–1	4–0	1st			
1955	Texas Tech	7–3–1	3–0–1	1st	L Sun		
Texas Tech Red Raiders (Independent) (1956–1959)
1956	Texas Tech	2–7–1					
1957	Texas Tech	2–8					
1958	Texas Tech	3–7					
1959	Texas Tech	4–6					
Texas Tech Red Raiders (Southwest Conference) (1960)
1960	Texas Tech	3–6–1	1–5–1	6th			
Texas Tech:		49–51–5	19–6–3				
Total:		49–51–5					
National championship Conference title Conference division title or championship game berth
^{#}Rankings from final Coaches Poll.; ^{°}Rankings from final AP Poll.
