= 1956 Marshall Thundering Herd football team =

American college football season

1956 Marshall Thundering Herd football
- Conference: Mid-American Conference
- Record: 3–6 (2–4 MAC)
- Head coach: Herb Royer (4th season)
- Home stadium: Fairfield Stadium

1956 Mid-American Conference football standings
	Conf.					Overall
Team	W		L		T	W		L		T
Bowling Green $	5	–	0	–	1	8	–	0	–	1
Miami (OH)	4	–	0	–	1	7	–	1	–	1
Kent State	4	–	2	–	0	7	–	2	–	0
Marshall	2	–	4	–	0	3	–	6	–	0
Ohio	2	–	4	–	0	2	–	7	–	0
Western Michigan	1	–	4	–	0	2	–	7	–	0
Toledo	1	–	5	–	0	1	–	7	–	1
$ – Conference champion

The 1956 Marshall Thundering Herd football team was an American football team that represented Marshall University in the Mid-American Conference (MAC) during the 1956 college football season. In its fourth season under head coach Herb Royer, the team compiled a 3–6 record (2–4 against conference opponents), tied for fourth place out of seven teams in the MAC, and was outscored by a total of 185 to 122. The team played its home games at Fairfield Stadium in Huntington, West Virginia.

== Schedule ==
Date	Opponent	Site	Result	Attendance	Source
September 22	at Xavier*	Xavier Stadium; Cincinnati, OH	L 6–30		
September 29	Morris Harvey*	Fairfield Stadium; Huntington, WV	W 25–13		
October 6	Western Michigan	Fairfield Stadium; Huntington, WV	W 13–0		
October 13	at Miami (OH)	Miami Field; Oxford, OH	L 14–21		
October 20	Kent State^{†}	Fairfield Stadium; Huntington, WV	L 7–25	7,000	
October 27	at Bowling Green	Bowling Green, OH	L 12–34		
November 3	at Youngstown State*	Rayen Stadium; Youngstown, OH	L 13–33		
November 9	Toledo	Fairfield Stadium; Huntington, WV	W 32–12		
November 17	at Ohio	Peden Stadium; Athens, OH (rivalry)	L 0–16		
*Non-conference game; ^{†}Homecoming
