= 1956 Western Michigan Broncos football team =

American college football season

1956 Western Michigan Broncos football
- Conference: Mid-American Conference
- Record: 2–7 (1–4 MAC)
- Head coach: Jack Petoskey (4th season)
- MVP: John Berryman
- Captain: Bob Soderman
- Home stadium: Waldo Stadium

1956 Mid-American Conference football standings
| | Conf. | | | | | Overall |
| Team | W | | L | | T | W | | L | | T |
|---|---|---|---|---|---|---|---|---|---|---|
| Bowling Green $ | 5 | – | 0 | – | 1 | 8 | – | 0 | – | 1 |
| Miami (OH) | 4 | – | 0 | – | 1 | 7 | – | 1 | – | 1 |
| Kent State | 4 | – | 2 | – | 0 | 7 | – | 2 | – | 0 |
| Marshall | 2 | – | 4 | – | 0 | 3 | – | 6 | – | 0 |
| Ohio | 2 | – | 4 | – | 0 | 2 | – | 7 | – | 0 |
| Western Michigan | 1 | – | 4 | – | 0 | 2 | – | 7 | – | 0 |
| Toledo | 1 | – | 5 | – | 0 | 1 | – | 7 | – | 1 |
$ – Conference champion

The 1956 Western Michigan Broncos football team represented Western Michigan College (renamed Western Michigan University in 1957) in the Mid-American Conference (MAC) during the 1956 college football season. In their fourth and final season under head coach Jack Petoskey, the Broncos compiled a 2–7 record (1–4 against MAC opponents), finished in sixth place in the MAC, and were outscored by their opponents, 168 to 114. The team played its home games at Waldo Stadium in Kalamazoo, Michigan.

Center Bob Soderman was the team captain. End and tackle John Berryman received the team's most outstanding player award.

Jack Petoskey resigned as the team's head coach on December 13, 1956; he compiled a record of 8–25–2 in four years at Western Michigan.

== Schedule ==
| Date | Opponent | Site | Result | Attendance | Source |
|---|---|---|---|---|---|
| September 22 | Central Michigan | Waldo Stadium; Kalamazoo, MI (rivalry) | L 7–14 | 13,000 | |
| September 29 | Bowling Green | Waldo Stadium; Kalamazoo, MI | L 13–27 | | |
| October 6 | at Marshall | Fairfield Stadium; Huntington, WV | L 0–13 | | |
| October 13 | Toledo | Waldo Stadium; Kalamazoo, MI | W 26–15 | | |
| October 20 | at Washington University* | Francis Field; St. Louis, MO | L 7–13 | 2,000 | |
| October 27 | at Great Lakes Navy* | Great Lakes, IL | L 6–13 | | |
| November 3 | Ohio | Waldo Stadium; Kalamazoo, MI | L 0–27 | | |
| November 10 | Western Reserve | Waldo Stadium; Kalamazoo, MI | W 42–19 | | |
| November 17 | Kent State | Memorial Stadium; Kent, OH | L 13–27 | | |
*Non-conference game
