= Tony Cavallo =

American football coach

Playing career
- 1936–1938: Lafayette
- 1939: Providence Steam Rollers
- Position: Halfback

Coaching career (HC unless noted)
- 1940: Lafayette (assistant)
- 1940s: Perkiomen School (PA)
- 1940s: Ramsey HS (NJ)
- 1949: George Washington (assistant)
- 1953–1954: Glendale HS (AZ)
- 1955–1957: New Mexico A&M

Head coaching record
- Overall: 7–23 (college)

Anthony J. Cavallo was an American football player and coach. He served as the head football coach at New Mexico College of Agriculture and Mechanic Arts—now known as New Mexico State University—from 1955 to 1957, compiling a record of 7–23. A native of Weymouth, Massachusetts, Cavallo played college football as a halfback at Lafayette College. He was an assistant coach at Lafayette in 1940. Cavallo later coached at the Perkiomen School in Pennsburg, Pennsylvania and at Ramsey High School in Ramsey, New Jersey before he was hired as an assistant coach at George Washington University in 1949. He served as the head football coach at Glendale High School in Glendale, Arizona for two seasons, 1953 and 1954, before moving to New Mexico A&M.

== Head coaching record ==
=== College ===
Year	Team	Overall	Conference	Standing	Bowl/playoffs
New Mexico A&M Aggies (Border Conference) (1955–1957)
1955	New Mexico A&M	3–7	0–4	7th	
1956	New Mexico A&M	1–9	0–4	6th	
1957	New Mexico A&M	3–7	0–4	T–5th	
New Mexico A&M:		7–23	0–12		
Total:		7–23			
