= 1956 Arkansas State Indians football team =

American college football season

1956 Arkansas State Indians football
- Conference: Independent
- Record: 5–4
- Head coach: Gene Harlow (2nd season)
- Home stadium: Kays Stadium

1956 Southern non-major college football independents records
	Conf.			Overall
Team	W	L	T	W		L		T
Tampa		–		7	–	2	–	0
Mississippi Southern		–		7	–	2	–	1
Louisville		–		6	–	3	–	0
Delaware		–		5	–	3	–	1
Memphis State		–		5	–	4	–	1
Arkansas State		–		5	–	4	–	0
Chattanooga		–		5	–	4	–	0
Howard (AL)		–		2	–	5	–	2
Sewanee		–		1	–	6	–	1

The 1956 Arkansas State Indians football team represented Arkansas State College—now known as Arkansas State University—as an independent during the 1956 college football season. Led by second-year head coach Gene Harlow, the Indians compiled a record of 5–4.

== Schedule ==
Date	Opponent	Site	Result	Source
September 29	Concordia (NE)	Kays Stadium; Jonesboro, AR	W 56–0	
October 6	at Florence State	Municipal Stadium; Florence, AL	W 39–13	
October 13	Louisiana Tech	Kays Stadium; Jonesboro, AR	W 21–13	
October 20	at Mississippi State	Scott Field; Starkville, MS	L 9–19	
October 27	at Murray State	Cutchin Stadium; Murray, KY	W 28–27	
November 3	at Memphis State	Crump Stadium; Memphis, TN (rivalry)	L 0–34	
November 10	Tennessee Tech	Kays Stadium; Jonesboro, AR	L 6–26	
November 17	Austin Peay	Kays Stadium; Jonesboro, AR	W 27–13	
November 23	at Arkansas Tech	Russellville, AR	L 7–25	
