= 1956 Missouri Tigers football team =

American college football season

1956 Missouri Tigers football
- Conference: Big Seven Conference
- Record: 4–5–1 (3–2–1 Big 7)
- Head coach: Don Faurot (19th season)
- Home stadium: Memorial Stadium

1956 Big Seven Conference football standings
	Conf.					Overall
Team	W		L		T	W		L		T
No. 1 Oklahoma $	6	–	0	–	0	10	–	0	–	0
No. 20 Colorado	4	–	1	–	1	8	–	2	–	1
Missouri	3	–	2	–	1	4	–	5	–	1
Nebraska	3	–	3	–	0	4	–	6	–	0
Kansas	2	–	4	–	0	3	–	6	–	1
Kansas State	2	–	4	–	0	3	–	7	–	0
Iowa State	0	–	6	–	0	2	–	8	–	0
$ – Conference champion; Rankings from AP Poll

The 1956 Missouri Tigers football team was an American football team that represented the University of Missouri in the Big Seven Conference (Big 7) during the 1956 college football season. The team compiled a 4–5–1 record (3–2–1 in conference, third) and outscored its opponents 200 to 183. Don Faurot was the head coach for the last of 19 seasons. The team played its six home games on campus at Memorial Stadium in Columbia, Missouri.

The team's statistical leaders included Hank Kuhlman with 440 rushing yards and 37 points scored, Jim Hunter with 567 passing yards and 567 yards of total offense, and Charley James with 362 receiving yards.

After the season, Faurot stepped down as head coach but continued as athletic director. In early January 1957, 32-year-old Frank Broyles was hired as head coach; he was previously the backfield coach for six years at Georgia Tech, his alma mater.

== Schedule ==
Date	Opponent	Site	Result	Attendance	Source
September 22	Oregon State*	Memorial Stadium; Columbia, MO	L 13–19	22,000	
September 29	at Purdue*	Ross–Ade Stadium; West Lafayette, IN	L 7–16	46,455	
October 6	No. 12 SMU*	Memorial Stadium; Columbia, MO	L 27–33	25,000	
October 13	North Dakota State*	Memorial Stadium; Columbia, MO	W 42–0		
October 20	at Kansas State	Memorial Stadium; Manhattan, KS	W 20–6	13,000	
October 27	Iowa State	Memorial Stadium; Columbia, MO (rivalry)	W 34–0	17,200	
November 3	at Nebraska	Memorial Stadium; Lincoln, NE (rivalry)	L 14–15	35,000	
November 10	No. 18 Colorado	Memorial Stadium; Columbia, MO	T 14–14	25,000	
November 17	at No. 2 Oklahoma	Oklahoma Memorial Stadium; Norman, OK (rivalry)	L 14–67	57,000	
December 1	Kansas	Memorial Stadium; Columbia, MO (Border War)	W 15–13	28,000	
*Non-conference game; Rankings from AP Poll released prior to the game; Source:
