= 1956 Detroit Titans football team =

American college football season

1956 Detroit Titans football
- Conference: Missouri Valley Conference
- Record: 2–8 (0–4 MVC)
- Head coach: Wally Fromhart (3rd season)
- Captains: Robert Chendes; James Lynch
- Home stadium: University of Detroit Stadium

1956 Missouri Valley Conference football standings
	Conf.					Overall
Team	W		L		T	W		L		T
Houston $	4	–	0	–	0	7	–	2	–	1
Tulsa	2	–	1	–	1	7	–	2	–	1
Oklahoma A&M	2	–	1	–	1	3	–	5	–	2
Wichita	1	–	3	–	0	4	–	7	–	0
Detroit	0	–	4	–	0	2	–	8	–	0
$ – Conference champion

The 1956 Detroit Titans football team represented the University of Detroit in the Missouri Valley Conference (MVC) during the 1956 college football season. In their third season under head coach Wally Fromhart, the Titans compiled a 2–8 record (0–4 against conference opponents), finished last in the MVC, and were outscored by opponents by a combined total of 194 to 99.

The team's statistical leaders included Lou Faoro with 356 passing yards, Billy Russell with 183 rushing yards, Albert Korpak with 268 receiving yards, and Bill Dando with 24 points scored.

In addition to head coach Wally Fromhart, the coaching staff included Kenneth Stilley (line coach), Robert Dove (end coach), John Ray (freshman coach), and Dr. Raymond D. Forsyth (trainer). Robert Chendes and James Lynch were the team co-captains.

== Schedule ==
Date	Opponent	Site	Result	Attendance	Source
September 22	Marquette	University of Detroit Stadium; Detroit, MI	W 20–7	12,320	
September 30	Villanova	University of Detroit Stadium; Detroit, MI	L 7–8	10,123–10,143	
October 13	at Wichita	Veterans Field; Wichita, KS	L 13–19	9,724	
October 20	Tulsa^{†}	University of Detroit Stadium; Detroit, MI	L 0–3	9,118	
October 28	Boston College	University of Detroit Stadium; Detroit, MI	W 12–7	13,979	
November 3	at Cincinnati	Nippert Stadium; Cincinnati, OH	L 7–33	16,500	
November 10	Drake	University of Detroit Stadium; Detroit, MI	L 13–26	8,366	
November 17	at Oklahoma A&M	Lewis Field; Stillwater, OK	L 7–25		
November 25	at Dayton	UD Stadium; Dayton, OH	L 13–27		
December 1	at Houston	Rice Stadium; Houston, TX	L 7–39	10,000	
^{†}Homecoming

== See also ==
- 1956 in Michigan
