= 1956 Kent State Golden Flashes football team =

American college football season

1956 Kent State Golden Flashes football
- Conference: Mid-American Conference
- Record: 7–2 (4–2 MAC)
- Head coach: Trevor J. Rees (11th season)
- Home stadium: Memorial Stadium

1956 Mid-American Conference football standings
| | Conf. | | | | | Overall |
| Team | W | | L | | T | W | | L | | T |
|---|---|---|---|---|---|---|---|---|---|---|
| Bowling Green $ | 5 | – | 0 | – | 1 | 8 | – | 0 | – | 1 |
| Miami (OH) | 4 | – | 0 | – | 1 | 7 | – | 1 | – | 1 |
| Kent State | 4 | – | 2 | – | 0 | 7 | – | 2 | – | 0 |
| Marshall | 2 | – | 4 | – | 0 | 3 | – | 6 | – | 0 |
| Ohio | 2 | – | 4 | – | 0 | 2 | – | 7 | – | 0 |
| Western Michigan | 1 | – | 4 | – | 0 | 2 | – | 7 | – | 0 |
| Toledo | 1 | – | 5 | – | 0 | 1 | – | 7 | – | 1 |
$ – Conference champion

The 1956 Kent State Golden Flashes football team was an American football team that represented Kent State University in the Mid-American Conference (MAC) during the 1956 college football season. In their 11th season under head coach Trevor J. Rees, the Golden Flashes compiled a 7–2 record (4–2 against MAC opponents), finished in third place in the MAC, and outscored all opponents by a combined total of 208 to 76.

The team's statistical leaders included Ron Fowler with 522 rushing yards, Ken Horton with 703 passing yards, and Dick Mihalus with 238 receiving yards. End Gino Gioia and fullback Luke Owens were selected as first-team All-MAC players.

== Schedule ==
| Date | Opponent | Site | Result | Attendance | Source |
|---|---|---|---|---|---|
| September 22 | at Bowling Green | University Stadium; Bowling Green, OH (rivalry) | L 0–17 | | |
| September 29 | at Louisville* | Fairgrounds Stadium; Louisville, KY | W 7–0 | | |
| October 6 | Waynesburg* | Memorial Stadium; Kent, OH | W 19–6 | | |
| October 13 | Ohio | Memorial Stadium; Kent, OH | W 32–13 | | |
| October 20 | at Marshall | Fairfield Stadium; Huntington, WV | W 25–7 | 7,000 | |
| October 27 | at Miami (OH) | Miami Field; Oxford, OH | L 0–14 | | |
| November 3 | Toledo | Memorial Stadium; Kent, OH | W 52–6 | | |
| November 10 | at Baldwin–Wallace* | Berea, OH | W 46–0 | | |
| November 17 | Western Michigan | Memorial Stadium; Kent, OH | W 27–13 | | |
*Non-conference game

== Personnel ==
=== Roster ===
- LB Lou Holtz
