= 1956 Chattanooga Moccasins football team =

American college football season

1956 Chattanooga Moccasins football
- Conference: Independent
- Record: 5–4
- Head coach: Scrappy Moore (26th season)
- Captain: Porter Henderson
- Home stadium: Chamberlain Field

1956 Southern non-major college football independents records
| | Conf. | | | Overall |
| Team | W | L | T | W | | L | | T |
|---|---|---|---|---|---|---|---|---|
| Tampa | | – | | 7 | – | 2 | – | 0 |
| Mississippi Southern | | – | | 7 | – | 2 | – | 1 |
| Louisville | | – | | 6 | – | 3 | – | 0 |
| Delaware | | – | | 5 | – | 3 | – | 1 |
| Memphis State | | – | | 5 | – | 4 | – | 1 |
| Arkansas State | | – | | 5 | – | 4 | – | 0 |
| Chattanooga | | – | | 5 | – | 4 | – | 0 |
| Howard (AL) | | – | | 2 | – | 5 | – | 2 |
| Sewanee | | – | | 1 | – | 6 | – | 1 |

The 1956 Chattanooga Moccasins football team was an American football team that represented the University of Chattanooga (now known as the University of Tennessee at Chattanooga) during the 1956 college football season. In their 26th year under head coach Scrappy Moore, the team compiled a 5–4 record.

== Schedule ==
| Date | Opponent | Site | Result | Attendance | Source |
|---|---|---|---|---|---|
| September 21 | Jacksonville State | Chamberlain Field; Chattanooga, TN | W 26–0 | | |
| September 29 | at No. 15 Vanderbilt | Dudley Field; Nashville, TN | L 7–46 | 17,500 | |
| October 6 | at Memphis State | Crump Stadium; Memphis, TN | W 14–13 | 5,786 | |
| October 13 | at No. 6 Tennessee | Shields–Watkins Field; Knoxville, TN | L 20–42 | 20,000 | |
| October 19 | Abilene Christian^{†} | Chamberlain Field; Chattanooga, TN | W 28–20 | | |
| October 27 | Mississippi Southern | Faulkner Field; Hattiesburg, MS | L 0–33 | 6,500 | |
| November 2 | Tampa | Chamberlain Field; Chattanooga, TN | W 33–0 | | |
| November 16 | McMurry | Chamberlain Field; Chattanooga, TN | W 19–14 | 4,500 | |
| November 22 | North Texas State | Chamberlain Field; Chattanooga, TN | L 7–20 | | |
^{†}Homecoming; Rankings from AP Poll released prior to the game
