= 1956 Xavier Musketeers football team =

American college football season

1956 Xavier Musketeers football
- Conference: Independent
- Record: 7–3
- Head coach: Harry Connolly (2nd season)
- Home stadium: Xavier Stadium

1956 Midwestern non-major college football independents records
	Conf.			Overall
Team	W	L	T	W		L		T
Northern Michigan		–		7	–	0	–	1
St. Norbert		–		8	–	1	–	0
Carthage		–		8	–	2	–	0
Wabash		–		6	–	2	–	1
Xavier		–		7	–	3	–	0
Washington University		–		6	–	3	–	0
Baldwin–Wallace		–		4	–	5	–	0
Rose Poly		–		3	–	4	–	0

The 1956 Xavier Musketeers football team was an American football team that represented Xavier University as an independent during the 1956 college football season. In its second season under head coach Harry Connolly, the team compiled a 7–3 record and outscored opponents by a total of 215 to 150. The team played its home games at Xavier Stadium in Cincinnati.

== Schedule ==
Date	Opponent	Site	Result	Attendance	Source
September 16	Saint Joseph's (IN)	Xavier Stadium; Cincinnati, OH	W 13–8	9,000	
September 22	Marshall	Xavier Stadium; Cincinnati, OH	W 30–6		
September 29	at Miami (OH)	Miami Field; Oxford, OH	L 7–14		
October 6	Ohio	Xavier Stadium; Cincinnati, OH	W 31–7		
October 13	at Cincinnati	Nippert Stadium; Cincinnati, OH	W 34–14	28,000–28,500	
October 20	Quantico Marines	Xavier Stadium; Cincinnati, OH	L 13–27		
October 27	Dayton	Xavier Stadium; Cincinnati, OH	W 26–13	8,000	
November 3	Colorado A&M	Xavier Stadium; Cincinnati, OH	W 27–14	6,000	
November 10	at Louisville	Parkway Field; Louisville, KY	W 34–14		
November 17	at Kentucky	McLean Stadium; Lexington, KY	L 0–33		
