= 1956 Texas Tech Red Raiders football team =

American college football season

1956 Texas Tech Red Raiders football
- Conference: Independent
- Record: 2–7–1
- Head coach: DeWitt Weaver (6th season)
- Offensive scheme: T formation
- Base defense: 5–3
- Home stadium: Jones Stadium

1956 Southern major college football independents records
	Conf.			Overall
Team	W	L	T	W		L		T
No. 6 Miami (FL)		–		8	–	1	–	1
No. 16 Navy		–		6	–	1	–	2
Florida State		–		5	–	4	–	1
Texas Tech		–		2	–	7	–	1
Rankings from AP poll

The 1956 Texas Tech Red Raiders football team represented Texas Technological College—now known as Texas Tech University—as an independent during the 1956 college football season. In their sixth season under head coach DeWitt Weaver, the Red Raiders compiled a 2–7–1 record and were outscored by opponents by a combined total of 216 to 117. The team's statistical leaders included Buddy Hill with 326 passing yards, Doug Duncan with 360 rushing yards, and Ken Vakey with 180 receiving yards. The team played its home games at Clifford B. and Audrey Jones Stadium.

== Schedule ==
Date	Opponent	Site	Result	Attendance	Source
September 22	Texas Western	Jones Stadium; Lubbock, TX	L 13–17	17,000	
September 29	at Baylor	Baylor Stadium; Waco, TX (rivalry)	L 0–27	15,000	
October 6	vs. No. 11 Texas A&M	Cotton Bowl; Dallas, TX (rivalry)	L 7–40	32,500	
October 13	West Texas State	Jones Stadium; Lubbock, TX	L 14–34	20,500	
October 27	at Arizona	Arizona Stadium; Tucson, AZ	W 21–7	22,000	
November 3	Oklahoma A&M^{†}	Jones Stadium; Lubbock, TX	T 13–13	17,000	
November 10	No. 17 TCU	Jones Stadium; Lubbock, TX (rivalry)	W 21–7	22,000–23,000	
November 17	at Tulsa	Skelly Stadium; Tulsa, OK	L 7–10	12,152	
November 24	Houston	Jones Stadium; Lubbock, TX (rivalry)	L 7–20	15,500	
December 1	at Hardin–Simmons	Fair Park Stadium; Abilene, TX	L 14–41	5,000	
^{†}Homecoming; Rankings from AP Poll released prior to the game
