= 1956 South Dakota Coyotes football team =

American college football season

1956 South Dakota Coyotes football
- Conference: North Central Conference
- Record: 4–4 (4–2 NCC)
- Head coach: Ralph Stewart (1st season)
- Home stadium: Inman Field

1956 North Central Conference football standings
	Conf.					Overall
Team	W		L		T	W		L		T
Morningside $	4	–	1	–	1	6	–	1	–	1
Augustana (SD)	4	–	2	–	0	6	–	3	–	0
South Dakota	4	–	2	–	0	4	–	4	–	0
North Dakota State	3	–	3	–	0	5	–	4	–	0
South Dakota State	3	–	3	–	0	4	–	5	–	0
North Dakota	2	–	4	–	0	2	–	6	–	0
Iowa State Teachers	0	–	5	–	1	2	–	5	–	1
$ – Conference champion

The 1956 South Dakota Coyotes football team was an American football team that represented the University of South Dakota as a member of the North Central Conference (NCC) during the 1956 college football season. In their first season under head coach Ralph Stewart, the Coyotes compiled a 4–4 record (4–2 against NCC opponents), tied for second place out of seven teams in the NCC, and were outscored by a total of 146 to 140. They played their home games at Inman Field in Vermillion, South Dakota.

== Schedule ==
Date	Opponent	Site	Result	Attendance	Source
September 22	at Nebraska*	Memorial Stadium; Lincoln, NE	L 6–34	30,000–31,260	
September 29	at Augustana (SD)	Viking Field; Sioux Falls, SD	L 12–14	6,000	
October 6	at North Dakota	Memorial Stadium; Grand Forks, ND (Sitting Bull Trophy)	W 32–14		
October 13	at Morningside	Public Schools Stadium; Sioux City, IA	L 6–13		
October 20	South Dakota State	Inman Field; Vermillion, SD (Dakota Day, rivalry)	W 19–14	7,000	
October 27	at Saint Louis*	Walsh Stadium; St. Louis, MO	L 7–27		
November 3	Iowa State Teachers	Inman Field; Vermillion, SD	W 20–19		
November 10	North Dakota State	Inman Field; Vermillion, SD	W 13–7		
*Non-conference game
