= 1956 New Mexico A&M Aggies football team =

American college football season

1956 New Mexico A&M Aggies football
- Conference: Border Conference
- Record: 1–9 (0–4 Border)
- Head coach: Tony Cavallo (2nd season)
- Home stadium: Memorial Stadium

1956 Border Conference football standings
	Conf.					Overall
Team	W		L		T	W		L		T
Texas Western $	5	–	0	–	0	9	–	2	–	0
Arizona State	3	–	1	–	0	9	–	1	–	0
West Texas State	2	–	2	–	0	8	–	2	–	0
Arizona	1	–	2	–	0	4	–	6	–	0
Hardin–Simmons	1	–	3	–	0	4	–	6	–	0
New Mexico A&M	0	–	4	–	0	1	–	9	–	0
$ – Conference champion

The 1956 New Mexico A&M Aggies football team was an American football team that represented New Mexico College of Agriculture and Mechanical Arts (now known as New Mexico State University) as a member of the Border Conference during the 1956 college football season. In their second year under head coach Tony Cavallo, the Aggies compiled a 1–9 record (0–4 against conference opponents), finished last in the conference, and were outscored by a total of 276 to 131. The team played home games at Memorial Stadium in Las Cruces, New Mexico.

== Schedule ==
Date	Time	Opponent	Site	Result	Attendance	Source
September 15		at Tulsa*	Skelly Field; Tulsa, OK	L 6–27	17,013	
September 22		New Mexico*	Memorial Stadium; Las Cruces, NM (rivalry)	L 6–14	7,000	
September 29		at Cal Poly*	Mustang Stadium; San Luis Obispo, CA	L 7–32		
October 6		Arizona State	Memorial Stadium; Las Cruces, NM	L 7–28	4,000	
October 13		McMurry*	Memorial Stadium; Las Cruces, NM	L 13–14		
October 20		at West Texas State	Buffalo Stadium; Canyon, TX	L 0–45		
October 27		Texas Western	Memorial Stadium; Las Cruces, NM (rivalry)	L 7–51		
November 10		at Omaha*	Al F. Caniglia Field; Omaha, NE	L 20–21		
November 17		Nebraska Wesleyan*	Memorial Stadium; Las Cruces, NM	W 46–6		
November 24	2:00 p.m.	vs. Hardin–Simmons	Caveman Field; Carlsbad, NM	L 19–38	> 2,000	
*Non-conference game; All times are in Mountain time
