= 1956 Arizona State Sun Devils football team =

American college football season

1956 Arizona State Sun Devils football
- Conference: Border Conference
- Record: 9–1 (3–1 Border)
- Head coach: Dan Devine (2nd season)
- Home stadium: Goodwin Stadium

1956 Border Conference football standings
	Conf.					Overall
Team	W		L		T	W		L		T
Texas Western $	5	–	0	–	0	9	–	2	–	0
Arizona State	3	–	1	–	0	9	–	1	–	0
West Texas State	2	–	2	–	0	8	–	2	–	0
Arizona	1	–	2	–	0	4	–	6	–	0
Hardin–Simmons	1	–	3	–	0	4	–	6	–	0
New Mexico A&M	0	–	4	–	0	1	–	9	–	0
$ – Conference champion

The 1956 Arizona State Sun Devils football team was an American football team that represented Arizona State College in the Border Conference during the 1956 college football season. In their second season under head coach Dan Devine, the Sun Devils compiled a 9–1 record (3–1 against Border opponents) and outscored their opponents 306 to 83.

The team's statistical leaders included Dave Graybill with 578 passing yards, Bobby Mulgado with 721 rushing yards, and Gene Mitcham with 256 receiving yards.

== Schedule ==
Date	Opponent	Site	Result	Attendance	Source
September 22	Wichita*	Goodwin Stadium; Tempe, AZ	W 37–9	16,000	
September 29	North Texas State*	Goodwin Stadium; Tempe, AZ	W 27–7	16,000	
October 6	at New Mexico A&M	Memorial Stadium; Las Cruces, NM	W 28–7	4,000	
October 13	at Idaho*	Neale Stadium; Moscow, ID	W 41–0	6,500	
October 20	at Hardin–Simmons	Parramore Stadium; Abilene, TX	W 26–13	6,000	
October 27	San Jose State*	Goodwin Stadium; Tempe, AZ	W 47–13	16,300	
November 3	San Diego State*	Goodwin Stadium; Tempe, AZ	W 61–0	16,000	
November 10	Texas Western	Goodwin Stadium; Tempe, AZ	L 0–28	16,300	
November 17	at Arizona	Arizona Stadium; Tucson, AZ (Territorial Cup)	W 20–0	25,452	
November 24	Pacific (CA)*	Goodwin Stadium; Tempe, AZ	W 19–6	15,500	
*Non-conference game

== Roster ==
- HB Bobby Mulgado
