= 1956 Louisville Cardinals football team =

American college football season

1956 Louisville Cardinals football
- Conference: Independent
- Record: 6–3
- Head coach: Frank Camp (11th season)
- Home stadium: Parkway Field

1956 Southern non-major college football independents records
	Conf.			Overall
Team	W	L	T	W		L		T
Tampa		–		7	–	2	–	0
Mississippi Southern		–		7	–	2	–	1
Louisville		–		6	–	3	–	0
Delaware		–		5	–	3	–	1
Memphis State		–		5	–	4	–	1
Arkansas State		–		5	–	4	–	0
Chattanooga		–		5	–	4	–	0
Howard (AL)		–		2	–	5	–	2
Sewanee		–		1	–	6	–	1

The 1956 Louisville Cardinals football team was an American football team that represented the University of Louisville as an independent during the 1956 college football season. In their 11th season under head coach Frank Camp, the Cardinals compiled a 6–3 record.

The team's statistical leaders included Ken Porco with 581 rushing yards and Dale Orem with 385 passing yards.

== Schedule ==
Date	Opponent	Site	Result	Attendance	Source
September 22	at Toledo	Glass Bowl; Toledo, OH	W 27–12		
September 29	Kent State	Parkway Field; Louisville, KY	L 0–7		
October 6	Evansville	Parkway Field; Louisville, KY	W 41–13	3,500	
October 13	Murray State	Parkway Field; Louisville, KY	W 7–6		
October 20	at Morehead State	Morehead, KY	W 19–7		
October 27	at Ohio	Peden Stadium; Athens, OH	W 25–19		
November 3	Dayton^{†}	Parkway Field; Louisville, KY	L 6–7	8,526	
November 10	Xavier	Parkway Field; Louisville, KY	L 14–34		
November 17	Eastern Kentucky	Parkway Field; Louisville, KY	W 14–6	2,019	
^{†}Homecoming
