= 1956 Miami Redskins football team =

American college football season

1956 Miami Redskins football
- Conference: Mid-American Conference
- Record: 7–1-1 (4–0–1 MAC)
- Head coach: John Pont (1st season)
- Captain: Mack Yoho
- Home stadium: Miami Field

1956 Mid-American Conference football standings
	Conf.					Overall
Team	W		L		T	W		L		T
Bowling Green $	5	–	0	–	1	8	–	0	–	1
Miami (OH)	4	–	0	–	1	7	–	1	–	1
Kent State	4	–	2	–	0	7	–	2	–	0
Marshall	2	–	4	–	0	3	–	6	–	0
Ohio	2	–	4	–	0	2	–	7	–	0
Western Michigan	1	–	4	–	0	2	–	7	–	0
Toledo	1	–	5	–	0	1	–	7	–	1
$ – Conference champion

The 1956 Miami Redskins football team was an American football team that represented Miami University in the Mid-American Conference (MAC) during the 1956 college football season. In its first season under head coach John Pont, Miami compiled a 7–1-1 record (4–0–1 against MAC opponents), finished in second place in the MAC, held five of nine opponents to seven points or less, and outscored all opponents by a combined total of 159 to 83.

Mack Yoho was the team captain. The team's statistical leaders included Dave Thelen with 635 rushing yards, Tom Dimitroff with 349 passing yards, and Charles Brockmeyer with 60 receiving yards.

== Schedule ==
Date	Opponent	Site	Result	Attendance	Source
September 22	George Washington*	Miami Field; Oxford, OH	L 6–7	6,546	
September 29	Xavier*	Miami Field; Oxford, OH	W 14–7		
October 6	Toledo	Miami Field; Oxford, OH	W 33–14		
October 13	Marshall	Miami Field; Oxford, OH	W 21–14		
October 20	at Ohio	Peden Stadium; Athens, OH (rivalry)	W 16–7		
October 27	Kent State	Miami Field; Oxford, OH	W 14–0		
November 3	at Bowling Green	University Stadium; Bowling Green, OH	T 7–7		
November 10	Dayton*	Miami Field; Oxford, OH	W 21–14	8,000	
November 22	at Cincinnati*	Nippert Stadium; Cincinnati, OH (rivalry)	W 27–13	17,000	
*Non-conference game
