= 1956 Hardin–Simmons Cowboys football team =

American college football season

1956 Hardin–Simmons Cowboys football
- Conference: Border Conference
- Record: 4–6 (1–3 Border)
- Head coach: Sammy Baugh (2nd season)
- Home stadium: Parramore Stadium

1956 Border Conference football standings
	Conf.					Overall
Team	W		L		T	W		L		T
Texas Western $	5	–	0	–	0	9	–	2	–	0
Arizona State	3	–	1	–	0	9	–	1	–	0
West Texas State	2	–	2	–	0	8	–	2	–	0
Arizona	1	–	2	–	0	4	–	6	–	0
Hardin–Simmons	1	–	3	–	0	4	–	6	–	0
New Mexico A&M	0	–	4	–	0	1	–	9	–	0
$ – Conference champion

The 1956 Hardin–Simmons Cowboys football team was an American football team that represented Hardin–Simmons University in the Border Conference during the 1956 college football season. In its second season under head coach Sammy Baugh, the team compiled a 4–6 record (1–3 against conference opponents), finished in fifth place in the conference, and was outscored by a total of 217 to 164. The team played its home games at Parramore Stadium, also known as Parramore Field, in Abilene, Texas.

No Hardin-Simmons players were named to the 1956 All-Border Conference football team.

== Schedule ==
Date	Time	Opponent	Site	Result	Attendance	Source
September 22		at Arkansas*	Razorback Stadium; Fayetteville, AR	L 6–21	19,000	
September 29		at Wichita*	Veterans Field; Wichita, KS	W 20–7	12,800–12,806	
October 5		at George Washington*	Griffith Stadium; Washington, DC	L 7–13	10,000	
October 20		Arizona State	Parramore Stadium; Abilene, TX	L 13–26	6,000	
October 27		at Tulsa*	Skelly Field; Tulsa, OK	L 0–27	13,944	
November 3		at Texas Western	Kidd Field; El Paso, TX	L 13–51	12,000	
November 10		West Texas State	Parramore Stadium; Abilene, TX	L 6–20	5,250	
November 17		at Pacific (CA)*	Pacific Memorial Stadium; Stockton, CA	W 20–19	12,500	
November 24	3:00 p.m.	vs. New Mexico A&M	Caveman Field; Carlsbad, NM	W 38–19	> 2,000	
December 1		Texas Tech*	Fair Park Stadium; Abilene, TX	W 41–14	5,000	
*Non-conference game; All times are in Central time
