= 1956 Bowling Green Falcons football team =

American college football season

1956 Bowling Green Falcons football

MAC champion
- Conference: Mid-American Conference
- Record: 8–0–1 (5–0–1 MAC)
- Head coach: Doyt Perry (2nd season)
- MVP: Jack Giroux
- Captains: Jack Giroux; Harold Peek
- Home stadium: University Stadium

1956 Mid-American Conference football standings
	Conf.					Overall
Team	W		L		T	W		L		T
Bowling Green $	5	–	0	–	1	8	–	0	–	1
Miami (OH)	4	–	0	–	1	7	–	1	–	1
Kent State	4	–	2	–	0	7	–	2	–	0
Marshall	2	–	4	–	0	3	–	6	–	0
Ohio	2	–	4	–	0	2	–	7	–	0
Western Michigan	1	–	4	–	0	2	–	7	–	0
Toledo	1	–	5	–	0	1	–	7	–	1
$ – Conference champion

The 1956 Bowling Green Falcons football team was an American football team that represented Bowling Green State University in the Mid-American Conference (MAC) during the 1956 college football season. In their second season under head coach Doyt Perry, the Falcons compiled an 8–0–1 record (5–0–1 against MAC opponents), won the MAC championship, and outscored all opponents by a combined total of 311 to 99.

The team's statistical leaders were Don Nehlen with 362 passing yards, Vic DeOrio with 816 rushing yards, and Ray Reese with 183 receiving yards. Jack Giroux received the team's Most Valuable Player award. The team set a school record, which still stands, with 10 touchdowns in a 73-0 victory over Defiance College on September 15, 1956.

== Schedule ==
Date	Opponent	Site	Result
September 15	Defiance*	University Stadium; Bowling Green, OH	W 73–0
September 22	Kent State	University Stadium; Bowling Green, OH (rivalry)	W 17–0
September 29	at Western Michigan	Waldo Stadium; Kalamazoo, MI	W 27–13
October 6	at Drake*	Drake Stadium; Des Moines, IA	W 46–7
October 13	at Baldwin–Wallace*	Berea, OH	W 33–21
October 20	at Toledo	Glass Bowl; Toledo, OH (rivalry)	W 34–12
October 27	Marshall	University Stadium; Bowling Green, OH	W 34–12
November 3	Miami (OH)	University Stadium; Bowling Green, OH	T 7–7
November 10	Ohio	University Stadium; Bowling Green, OH	W 41–27
*Non-conference game
