= 1956 Marquette Warriors football team =

American college football season

1956 Marquette Warriors football
- Conference: Independent
- Record: 0–9
- Head coach: John F. Druze (1st season)
- Home stadium: Marquette Stadium

1956 Midwestern major college football independents records
	Conf.			Overall
Team	W	L	T	W		L		T
Cincinnati		–		4	–	5	–	0
Dayton		–		4	–	6	–	0
Drake		–		3	–	6	–	0
Notre Dame		–		2	–	8	–	0
Marquette		–		0	–	9	–	0

The 1956 Marquette Warriors football team was an American football team that represented Marquette University as an independent during the 1956 college football season. In its first season under head coach John F. Druze, the team compiled a 0–9 record and was outscored by a total of 303 to 72. The team played its home games at Marquette Stadium in Milwaukee.

== Schedule ==
Date	Opponent	Site	Result	Attendance	Source
September 22	at Detroit	University of Detroit Stadium; Detroit, MI	L 7–20	12,320	
September 29	at Wisconsin	Camp Randall Stadium; Madison, WI	L 0–41	52,700	
October 6	at Tulsa	Skelly Field; Tulsa, OK	L 0–54	13,718	
October 13	Boston College	Marquette Stadium; Milwaukee, WI	L 19–26	12,600	
October 20	Pacific (CA)	Marquette Stadium; Milwaukee, WI	L 6–28	16,100	
October 27	Cincinnati	Marquette Stadium; Milwaukee, WI	L 13–33	12,000–12,800	
November 3	at Indiana	Memorial Stadium; Bloomington, IN	L 13–19	21,000	
November 10	Kansas State	Marquette Stadium; Milwaukee, WI	L 14–41	10,300	
November 18	at Holy Cross	Fitton Field; Worcester, MA	L 0–41	6,000–7,000	
