= 1956 Boston College Eagles football team =

American college football season

1956 Boston College Eagles football
- Conference: Independent
- Record: 5–4
- Head coach: Mike Holovak (6th season)
- Captain: Henry Sullivan
- Home stadium: Fenway Park

1956 Eastern major college football independents records
	Conf.			Overall
Team	W	L	T	W		L		T
No. 8 Syracuse		–		7	–	2	–	0
Penn State		–		6	–	2	–	1
No. 13 Pittsburgh		–		7	–	3	–	1
Army		–		5	–	3	–	1
Holy Cross		–		5	–	3	–	1
Villanova		–		5	–	4	–	0
Boston College		–		5	–	4	–	0
Colgate		–		4	–	5	–	0
Boston University		–		1	–	5	–	2
Rankings from AP poll

The 1956 Boston College Eagles football team represented Boston College as an independent during the 1956 college football season. Led by sixth-year head coach Mike Holovak, the Eagles compiled a record of 5–4. Boston College played home games at Fenway Park in Boston, Massachusetts.

== Schedule ==
Date	Opponent	Site	Result	Attendance	Source
October 5	at No. 13 Miami (FL)	Burdine Stadium; Miami, FL	L 6–27	37,381	
October 13	at Marquette	Marquette Stadium; Milwaukee, WI	W 26–19	12,600	
October 20	at Rutgers	Rutgers Stadium; Piscataway, NJ	W 32–0	8,500	
October 28	at Detroit	University of Detroit Stadium; Detroit, MI	L 7–12	13,979	
November 2	Villanova	Fenway Park; Boston, MA	W 7–6	13,275	
November 10	Quantico Marines	Fenway Park; Boston, MA	L 6–20	7,404	
November 18	Boston University	Fenway Park; Boston, MA (rivalry)	W 13–0	15,077	
November 24	Brandeis	Fenway Park; Boston, MA	W 52–0	5,458	
December 1	vs. Holy Cross	Fenway Park; Boston, MA (rivalry)	L 0–7	34,176	
Rankings from AP Poll released prior to the game; Source:
