= 1956 Memphis State Tigers football team =

American college football season

1956 Memphis State Tigers football

Burley Bowl champion

Burley Bowl, W 32–12 vs. East Tennessee State
- Conference: Independent
- Record: 5–4–1
- Head coach: Ralph Hatley (10th season)
- Home stadium: Crump Stadium

1956 Southern non-major college football independents records
	Conf.			Overall
Team	W	L	T	W		L		T
Tampa		–		7	–	2	–	0
Mississippi Southern		–		7	–	2	–	1
Louisville		–		6	–	3	–	0
Delaware		–		5	–	3	–	1
Memphis State		–		5	–	4	–	1
Arkansas State		–		5	–	4	–	0
Chattanooga		–		5	–	4	–	0
Howard (AL)		–		2	–	5	–	2
Sewanee		–		1	–	6	–	1

The 1956 Memphis State Tigers football team was an American football team that represented Memphis State College (now known as the University of Memphis) as an independent during the 1956 college football season. In their tenth season under head coach Ralph Hatley, Memphis State compiled a 5–4–1 record and won the Burley Bowl.

== Schedule ==
Date	Opponent	Site	Result	Attendance	Source
September 15	Arkansas Tech	Crump Stadium; Memphis, TN	W 32–21		
September 22	at Tennessee Tech	Overhill Field; Cookeville, TN	T 14–14		
September 29	at Trinity (TX)	Alamo Stadium; San Antonio, TX	L 0–19		
October 6	Chattanooga	Crump Stadium; Memphis, TN	L 13–14	5,786	
October 13	Austin Peay	Crump Stadium; Memphis, TN	W 42–19		
October 20	at Mississippi Southern	Faulkner Field; Hattiesburg, MS (rivalry)	L 0–27	6,500	
October 27	Western Kentucky	Crump Stadium; Memphis, TN	W 42–0		
November 3	Arkansas State	Crump Stadium; Memphis, TN (rivalry)	W 34–0		
November 10	Ole Miss	Crump Stadium; Memphis, TN (rivalry)	L 0–26		
November 22	vs. East Tennessee State	Memorial Stadium; Johnson City, TN (Burley Bowl)	W 32–12	1,200	
