= 1956 Ohio Bobcats football team =

American college football season

1956 Ohio Bobcats football
- Conference: Mid-American Conference
- Record: 2–7 (2–4 MAC)
- Head coach: Carroll Widdoes (8th season)
- Home stadium: Peden Stadium

1956 Mid-American Conference football standings
	Conf.					Overall
Team	W		L		T	W		L		T
Bowling Green $	5	–	0	–	1	8	–	0	–	1
Miami (OH)	4	–	0	–	1	7	–	1	–	1
Kent State	4	–	2	–	0	7	–	2	–	0
Marshall	2	–	4	–	0	3	–	6	–	0
Ohio	2	–	4	–	0	2	–	7	–	0
Western Michigan	1	–	4	–	0	2	–	7	–	0
Toledo	1	–	5	–	0	1	–	7	–	1
$ – Conference champion

The 1956 Ohio Bobcats football team was an American football team that represented Ohio University in the Mid-American Conference (MAC) during the 1956 college football season. In their eighth season under head coach Carroll Widdoes, the Bobcats compiled a 2–7 record (2–4 against MAC opponents), finished in a tie for fourth place in the MAC, and were outscored by all opponents by a combined total of 211 to 36. They played their home games in Peden Stadium in Athens, Ohio.

== Schedule ==
Date	Opponent	Site	Result	Source
September 22	at Florida State*	Doak Campbell Stadium; Tallahassee, FL	L 7–47	
September 29	Toledo	Peden Stadium; Athens, OH	L 13–19	
October 6	at Xavier*	Xavier Stadium; Cincinnati, OH	L 7–31	
October 13	at Kent State	Memorial Stadium; Kent, OH	L 13–32	
October 20	Miami (OH)	Peden Stadium; Athens, OH (rivalry)	L 7–16	
October 27	Louisville*	Peden Stadium; Athens, OH	L 19–25	
November 3	at Western Michigan	Waldo Stadium; Kalamazoo, MI	W 27–0	
November 10	at Bowling Green	University Stadium; Bowling Green, OH	L 27–41	
November 17	Marshall	Peden Stadium; Athens, OH (rivalry)	W 16–0	
*Non-conference game
