= 1956 Wichita Shockers football team =

American college football season

1956 Wichita Shockers football
- Conference: Missouri Valley Conference
- Record: 4–6 (1–3 MVC)
- Head coach: Pete Tillman (2nd season)
- Home stadium: Veterans Field

1956 Missouri Valley Conference football standings
	Conf.					Overall
Team	W		L		T	W		L		T
Houston $	4	–	0	–	0	7	–	2	–	1
Tulsa	2	–	1	–	1	7	–	2	–	1
Oklahoma A&M	2	–	1	–	1	3	–	5	–	2
Wichita	1	–	3	–	0	4	–	7	–	0
Detroit	0	–	4	–	0	2	–	8	–	0
$ – Conference champion

The 1956 Wichita Shockers football team, sometimes known as the Wheatshockers, was an American football team that represented Wichita University (now known as Wichita State University) as a member of the Missouri Valley Conference during the 1956 college football season. In its second and final season under head coach Pete Tillman, the team compiled a 4–6 record (1–3 against conference opponents), finished in fourth place in the MVC, and was outscored by a total of 198 to 117. The team played its home games at Veterans Field, now known as Cessna Stadium.

== Schedule ==
Date	Opponent	Site	Result	Attendance	Source
September 15	BYU*	Veterans Field; Wichita, KS	W 13–0	14,302	
September 22	at Arizona State*	Goodwin Stadium; Tempe, AZ	L 9–37	16,000	
September 29	Hardin–Simmons*	Veterans Field; Wichita, KS	L 7–20	12,800–12,806	
October 6	Oklahoma A&M	Veterans Field; Wichita, KS	L 6–32	16,941	
October 13	Detroit	Veterans Field; Wichita, KS	W 19–13	9,724	
October 20	Drake*	Veterans Field; Wichita, KS	W 27–14	13,132	
November 3	Houston	Veterans Field; Wichita, KS	L 16–41	11,193	
November 10	at Cincinnati*	Nippert Stadium; Cincinnati, OH	L 0–21	16,000	
November 17	at Dayton*	UD Stadium; Dayton, OH	W 14–6	6,150	
November 24	at Tulsa	Skelly Field; Tulsa, OK	L 6–14	13,121	
*Non-conference game; Source:
