= 1956 Pacific Tigers football team =

American college football season

1956 Pacific Tigers football
- Conference: Independent
- Record: 6–3–1
- Head coach: Jack Myers (4th season)
- Home stadium: Pacific Memorial Stadium

1956 Western major college football independents records
| | Conf. | | | Overall |
| Team | W | L | T | W | | L | | T |
|---|---|---|---|---|---|---|---|---|
| Air Force | | – | | 6 | – | 2 | – | 1 |
| Pacific (CA) | | – | | 6 | – | 3 | – | 1 |
| San Jose State | | – | | 2 | – | 7 | – | 1 |

The 1956 Pacific Tigers football team represented the College of the Pacific (COP)—now known as the University of the Pacific—as an independent during the 1956 college football season. Led by fourth-year head coach Jack Myers, the Tigers compiled a record of 6–3–1 and outscored opponents 241 to 148. The team played home games at Pacific Memorial Stadium in Stockton, California.

== Schedule ==
| Date | Opponent | Site | Result | Attendance | Source |
|---|---|---|---|---|---|
| September 22 | Colorado A&M | Pacific Memorial Stadium; Stockton, CA | W 39–14 | 15,000–18,006 | |
| September 29 | at Kansas | Memorial Stadium; Lawrence, KS | T 27–27 | 17,000 | |
| October 6 | Cincinnati | Pacific Memorial Stadium; Stockton, CA | W 21–15 | 15,500 | |
| October 13 | at Fresno State | Ratcliffe Stadium; Fresno, CA | W 21–14 | 15,000 | |
| October 20 | at Marquette | Marquette Stadium; Milwaukee, WI | W 28–6 | 16,100 | |
| October 27 | Washington State | Pacific Memorial Stadium; Stockton, CA | W 33–12 | 23,500 | |
| November 3 | at Tulsa | Skelly Stadium; Tulsa, OK | L 13–14 | 15,500 | |
| November 10 | San Jose State | Pacific Memorial Stadium; Stockton, CA (Victory Bell) | W 34–7 | 22,000 | |
| November 17 | Hardin–Simmons | Pacific Memorial Stadium; Stockton, CA | L 19–20 | 12,500 | |
| November 24 | at Arizona State | Goodwin Stadium; Tempe, AZ | L 6–19 | 15,500 | |

== Team players in the NFL ==
The following College of the Pacific players were selected in the 1957 NFL draft.

| Player | Position | Round | Overall | NFL team |
| John Nisby | Guard | 6 | 70 | Green Bay Packers |
| Galen Laack | Guard | 9 | 105 | Washington Redskins |
| John Thomas | Guard – Tackle – Linebacker | 23 | 272 | San Francisco 49ers |
