= 1956 Arizona Wildcats football team =

American college football season

1956 Arizona Wildcats football
- Conference: Border Conference
- Record: 4–6 (1–2 Border)
- Head coach: Warren Woodson (5th season)
- Captains: Paul Hatcher; Art Luppino
- Home stadium: Arizona Stadium

1956 Border Conference football standings
	Conf.					Overall
Team	W		L		T	W		L		T
Texas Western $	5	–	0	–	0	9	–	2	–	0
Arizona State	3	–	1	–	0	9	–	1	–	0
West Texas State	2	–	2	–	0	8	–	2	–	0
Arizona	1	–	2	–	0	4	–	6	–	0
Hardin–Simmons	1	–	3	–	0	4	–	6	–	0
New Mexico A&M	0	–	4	–	0	1	–	9	–	0
$ – Conference champion

The 1956 Arizona Wildcats football team represented the University of Arizona in the Border Conference during the 1956 college football season. In their fifth and final season under head coach Warren B. Woodson, the Wildcats compiled a 4–6 record (1–2 against Border opponents) and were outscored by their opponents, 182 to 180. The team captains were Paul Hatcher and Art Luppino. The team played its home games in Arizona Stadium in Tucson, Arizona.

The team's statistical leaders included Ralph Hunsaker with 823 passing yards, Sal Gonzalez with 337 rushing yards, and Eddie Sine with 163 receiving yards.

== Schedule ==
Date	Opponent	Site	Result	Attendance	Source
September 15	vs. Montana*	Montgomery Stadium; Phoenix, AZ	W 27–12	12,000	
September 22	Wyoming*	Arizona Stadium; Tucson, AZ	L 20–26	23,000	
September 29	South Dakota State*	Arizona Stadium; Tucson, AZ	W 60–0	16,000	
October 6	Utah State*	Arizona Stadium; Tucson, AZ	L 7–12	20,500	
October 13	at Texas Western	Kidd Field; El Paso, TX	L 6–28		
October 20	at New Mexico*	Zimmerman Field; Albuquerque, NM	W 26–12	13,127	
October 27	Texas Tech*	Arizona Stadium; Tucson, AZ	L 7–21	22,000	
November 3	West Texas State	Arizona Stadium; Tucson, AZ	W 20–13	16,000	
November 17	Arizona State	Arizona Stadium; Tucson, AZ (rivalry)	L 0–20	25,452	
November 24	No. 20 Colorado*	Arizona Stadium; Tucson, AZ	L 7–38	12,000	
*Non-conference game; Rankings from AP Poll released prior to the game
