= 1956 Dayton Flyers football team =

American college football season

1956 Dayton Flyers football
- Conference: Independent
- Record: 4–6
- Head coach: Bud Kerr (1st season)
- Home stadium: UD Stadium

1956 Midwestern major college football independents records
	Conf.			Overall
Team	W	L	T	W		L		T
Cincinnati		–		4	–	5	–	0
Dayton		–		4	–	6	–	0
Drake		–		3	–	6	–	0
Notre Dame		–		2	–	8	–	0
Marquette		–		0	–	9	–	0

The 1956 Dayton Flyers football team represented the University of Dayton as an independent during the 1956 college football season. In their first season under head coach Bud Kerr, the Flyers compiled a 4–6 record. Dayton played their home games at UD Stadium in Dayton, Ohio.

== Schedule ==
Date	Opponent	Site	Result	Attendance	Source
September 22	at Cincinnati	Nippert Stadium; Cincinnati, OH	W 19–13	22,000	
September 30	at Holy Cross	Fitton Field; Worcester, MA	W 14–13	20,000	
October 6	Mississippi Southern	UD Stadium; Dayton, OH	L 6–23	7,895	
October 13	Villanova	UD Stadium; Dayton, OH	L 0–13	11,000	
October 20	NC State	UD Stadium; Dayton, OH	L 0–20	10,000	
October 27	at Xavier	Xavier Stadium; Cincinnati, OH	L 13–26	8,000	
November 3	at Louisville	Parkway Field; Louisville, KY	W 7–6	8,526	
November 10	at Miami (OH)	Miami Field; Oxford, OH	L 14–21	8,000	
November 17	Wichita	UD Stadium; Dayton, OH	L 6–14	6,150	
November 25	Detroit	UD Stadium; Dayton, OH	W 27–13		
