= Bobby Dodds =

English footballer

Personal information
- Date of birth: 1 July 1923
- Place of birth: Gateshead, England
- Position: Wing half

Senior career*
Years	Team	Apps	(Gls)
1946–1949	Darlington	34	(1)
–	Stockton		
- * Club domestic league appearances and goals

Robert Dodds (1 July 1923 – after 1948) was an English footballer who made 34 appearances in the Football League playing as a wing half for Darlington. He went on to play non-league football for clubs including Stockton.
