= 1956 Oklahoma Sooners football team =

American college football season

1956 Oklahoma Sooners football

Consensus national champion Big 7 champion
- Conference: Big Seven Conference

Ranking
- Coaches: No. 1
- AP: No. 1
- Record: 10–0 (6–0 Big 7)
- Head coach: Bud Wilkinson (10th season)
- Captains: Ed Gray; Jerry Tubbs
- Home stadium: Oklahoma Memorial Stadium

1956 Big Seven Conference football standings
| | Conf. | | | | | Overall |
| Team | W | | L | | T | W | | L | | T |
|---|---|---|---|---|---|---|---|---|---|---|
| No. 1 Oklahoma $ | 6 | – | 0 | – | 0 | 10 | – | 0 | – | 0 |
| No. 20 Colorado | 4 | – | 1 | – | 1 | 8 | – | 2 | – | 1 |
| Missouri | 3 | – | 2 | – | 1 | 4 | – | 5 | – | 1 |
| Nebraska | 3 | – | 3 | – | 0 | 4 | – | 6 | – | 0 |
| Kansas | 2 | – | 4 | – | 0 | 3 | – | 6 | – | 1 |
| Kansas State | 2 | – | 4 | – | 0 | 3 | – | 7 | – | 0 |
| Iowa State | 0 | – | 6 | – | 0 | 2 | – | 8 | – | 0 |
$ – Conference champion; Rankings from AP Poll

The 1956 Oklahoma Sooners football team was an American football team that represented the University of Oklahoma during the 1956 college football season. In their tenth season under head coach Bud Wilkinson, the Sooners compiled a 10–0 record and repeated as consensus national champions. The Sooners were led on offense by quarterback Jim Harris and played their home games at Oklahoma Memorial Stadium in Norman, Oklahoma.

After another undefeated season, Oklahoma was first in both final polls in early December. Their winning streak was up to forty games, but they did not play in a bowl game due to the Big Seven's no-repeat rule; runner-up Colorado was invited to and won the Orange Bowl.

== Schedule ==
| Date | Opponent | Rank | Site | TV | Result | Attendance | Source |
|---|---|---|---|---|---|---|---|
| September 29 | North Carolina* | No. 1 | Oklahoma Memorial Stadium; Norman, OK | | W 36–0 | 60,000 | |
| October 6 | Kansas State | No. 1 | Oklahoma Memorial Stadium; Norman, OK | | W 66–0 | 42,000 | |
| October 13 | vs. Texas* | No. 1 | Cotton Bowl; Dallas, TX (rivalry) | NBC | W 45–0 | 75,504 | |
| October 20 | at Kansas | No. 1 | Memorial Stadium; Lawrence, KS | | W 34–12 | 31,000 | |
| October 27 | at Notre Dame* | No. 2 | Notre Dame Stadium; Notre Dame, IN | NBC | W 40–0 | 60,128 | |
| November 3 | at No. 18 Colorado | No. 1 | Folsom Field; Boulder, CO | NBC | W 27–19 | 47,000 | |
| November 10 | at Iowa State | No. 1 | Clyde Williams Stadium; Ames, IA | | W 44–0 | 14,000 | |
| November 17 | Missouri | No. 1 | Oklahoma Memorial Stadium; Norman, OK (rivalry) | | W 67–14 | 57,000 | |
| November 24 | Nebraska | No. 1 | Oklahoma Memorial Stadium; Norman, OK (rivalry) | | W 54–6 | 46,000 | |
| December 1 | at Oklahoma A&M* | No. 1 | Lewis Field; Stillwater, OK (Bedlam Series) | | W 53–0 | 36,500 | |
*Non-conference game; Rankings from AP Poll released prior to the game; Source:

== Rankings ==
Ranking movements Legend: ██ Increase in ranking ██ Decrease in ranking ( ) = First-place votes
| | Week | | | | | | | | | | | |
| Poll | Pre | 1 | 2 | 3 | 4 | 5 | 6 | 7 | 8 | 9 | 10 | Final |
|---|---|---|---|---|---|---|---|---|---|---|---|---|
| AP | 1 (111) | 1 (91) | 1 (60) | 1 (76) | 1 (67) | 2 (44) | 1 (143) | 1 (116) | 2 (92) | 1 (111) | 1 (81) | 1 (104) |

== Game summaries ==
=== Texas ===
| Team | 1 | 2 | 3 | 4 | Total |
|---|---|---|---|---|---|
| Texas | 0 | 0 | 0 | 0 | 0 |
| • Oklahoma | 6 | 13 | 13 | 13 | 45 |

- Date: October 13
- Location: Cotton Bowl
- Game attendance: 75,504
- Game weather: 83 °F (28 °C)
- Television network: NBC

Scoring summary
| Q1 | 11:57 | OKLA | Thomas 2 yard run (kick failed) | OKLA 6–0 |
| Q2 | 14:27 | OKLA | McDonald 4 yard run (kick failed) | OKLA 12–0 |
| Q2 | :27 | OKLA | McDonald 27 yard pass from Harris (Harris kick) | OKLA 19–0 |
| Q3 | 8:41 | OKLA | Thomas 8 yard run (kick failed) | OKLA 25–0 |
| Q3 | 1:32 | OKLA | McDonald 44 yard run (Pricer kick) | OKLA 32–0 |
| Q4 | 12:55 | OKLA | Thomas 1 yard run (Pricer kick) | OKLA 39–0 |
| Q4 | :45 | OKLA | Day 25 yard interception return (kick failed) | OKLA 45–0 |

== Roster ==
- QB Jimmy Harris, Sr.
- HB Tommy McDonald, Sr.
- C Jerry Tubbs, Sr.

== Awards ==
- C Jerry Tubbs (All-American, Heisman Finalist)
- G Bill Krisher (All-American)
- HB Tommy McDonald (All-American)
- G Ed Gray (All-American)

== NFL draft ==
The following players were drafted into the National Football League following the season.

| Round | Pick | Player | Position | NFL team |
|---|---|---|---|---|
| 1 | 10 | Jerry Tubbs | Center | Chicago Cardinals |
| 3 | 31 | Tommy McDonald | Wide receiver | Philadelphia Eagles |
| 5 | 50 | Jimmy Harris | Quarterback | Philadelphia Eagles |
| 6 | 65 | Billy Pricer | Back | Baltimore Colts |
| 7 | 75 | Ed Gray | Tackle | Los Angeles Rams |
| 12 | 142 | Bob Derrick | Back | Chicago Cardinals |
| 28 | 336 | Tom Emerson | Guard | Chicago Bears |
