= 1957 Tangerine Bowl =

American college football game

West Texas State Buffaloes	Mississippi Southern Southerners
(7–2)	(7–1–1)
Border Conference	Independent
20	13
Head coach: Frank Kimbrough	Head coach: Thad Vann
	1	2	3	4	Total
West Texas State	0	0	6	14	20
Mississippi Southern	0	13	0	0	13
- Date: January 1, 1957
- Season: 1956
- Stadium: Tangerine Bowl
- Location: Orlando, Florida
- MVP: Ron Mills, West Texas State
- Attendance: 11,000

The 1957 Tangerine Bowl was an American college football bowl game played on January 1, 1957, at Tangerine Bowl in Orlando, Florida. The game pitted the Mississippi Southern Southerners (today's Southern Miss) and the West Texas State Buffaloes (now West Texas A&M).

== Background ==
The Buffaloes finished third in the Border Conference, but they still managed to get invited to the Tangerine Bowl, their second bowl appearance in seven seasons. The Southerners, an NCAA College Division independent, finished 7–1–1 while being invited to their third bowl game in four years.

== Game summary ==
Mississippi Southern built a 13–0 halftime lead on a J.C. Arvan "Statue of Liberty" touchdown play from 51 yards out along with a 53-yard touchdown pass from Bobby Hughes to Jerry Taylor. However, Ron Mills intercepted an Eagle pass and returned it 75 yards for a touchdown to make it 13–6. Mills added a two-yard plunge to tie the game at 13. Quarterback Bubba Hillman rushed for 19 yards and the touchdown that proved to be the winning points for West Texas State.

== Aftermath ==
The Southerners return to the next Tangerine Bowl a year later. The Buffaloes' next bowl game was the 1962 Sun Bowl.
