= Galen Wahlmeier =

American gridiron football player (1934–2018)

No. 42
- Positions: Centre, Linebacker

Personal information
- Born: February 19, 1934; Jennings, Kansas, U.S.
- Died: July 26, 2018 (aged 84); Kipling, Saskatchewan, Canada
- Listed height: 6 ft 0 in (1.83 m)
- Listed weight: 215 lb (98 kg)

Career history
- 1957–1967: Saskatchewan Roughriders

Awards and highlights
- Grey Cup champion (1966); CFL East All-Star (1957)

Galen Wahlmeier (February 19, 1934 – July 26, 2018) was a Canadian football player who played for the Saskatchewan Roughriders. He won the Grey Cup with them in 1966. He played college football at University of Kansas. In 1985, he was in a movie called Shipbuilder. Wahlmeier later served as mayor of Estevan, Saskatchewan. In 2018, he died in Kipling, Saskatchewan.
