= 1957 Orange Bowl =

American college football game

- 23rd Orange Bowl
- Burdine Stadium in Miami, Florida, hosted the Orange Bowl.
Colorado Buffaloes	Clemson Tigers
(7–2–1)	(7–1–2)
Big Seven	ACC
27	21
Head coach: Dallas Ward	Head coach: Frank Howard
AP / Coaches; 20 / 18	AP / Coaches; 19 / NR
	1	2	3	4	Total
Colorado	0	20	0	7	27
Clemson	0	0	14	7	21
- Date: January 1, 1957
- Season: 1956
- Stadium: Burdine Stadium
- Location: Miami, Florida
- Favorite: Colorado by 3 points
- Referee: Cliff Ogden (Big Seven; split crew: Big Seven, ACC)
- Attendance: 72,552

United States TV coverage
- Network: CBS
- Announcers: Tom Harmon

The 1957 Orange Bowl was a college football bowl game between the Clemson Tigers and the Colorado Buffaloes. It was played on New Year's Day in Miami.

== Background ==
Colorado was the runner-up in the Big Seven Conference in 1956; they played in the Orange Bowl over national champion Oklahoma due to a Big Seven rule at the time not permitting consecutive bowl appearances. Clemson was the champion of the Atlantic Coast Conference, their first conference title since the Southern Conference title in 1948. This was Clemson's first bowl game since 1951 and first Orange Bowl since 1950. This was Colorado's first bowl game in nineteen years since the Cotton Bowl in 1938, and they were favored by a field goal.

== Game summary ==
John Bayuk led the Buffaloes to a 20–0 halftime lead, beginning with his 2-yard run. Boyd Dowler made it 14–0 on his 6-yard run. Howard Cook concluded the first half scoring with his 26-yard touchdown run. At halftime, Howard threatened to resign if his team did not put up some effort. Clemson responded with 21 straight points. Joel Wells scored two touchdowns from 3 and 58 yards out to narrow the lead to 6, then Bob Spooner gave the Tigers the lead on his 1-yard touchdown run, with 11:22 to go. Strangely, Clemson elected to onside kick the ball, which Colorado recovered. The Buffaloes drove 53 yards in 8 plays and concluded with a John Bayuk touchdown to take the lead once again. With time running down, Clemson recovered a fumble at the Colorado 27. However, Bob Stransky intercepted Charlie Bussey's pass, sealing the win for Colorado.

== Aftermath ==
Colorado returned to the Orange Bowl five years later in 1962, but Clemson did not return for a quarter century, which was a win over Nebraska in January 1982 to win the consensus national championship.

== Statistics ==
Statistics	Colorado	Clemson
First downs	16	14
Rushing yards	279	217
Interceptions	0	2
Passing yards	27	25
Total yards	306	242
Punts–average	5–36.6	7–37.9
Fumbles–lost	8–3	0–0
Penalties–yards	5–55	4–40
