= 1956 Cincinnati Bearcats football team =

American college football season

1956 Cincinnati Bearcats football
- Conference: Independent
- Record: 4–5
- Head coach: George Blackburn (2nd season)
- Captain: Jack Gordon
- Home stadium: Nippert Stadium

1956 Midwestern major college football independents records
	Conf.			Overall
Team	W	L	T	W		L		T
Cincinnati		–		4	–	5	–	0
Dayton		–		4	–	6	–	0
Drake		–		3	–	6	–	0
Notre Dame		–		2	–	8	–	0
Marquette		–		0	–	9	–	0

The 1956 Cincinnati Bearcats football team represented the University of Cincinnati as an independent during the 1956 college football season. Led by second-year head coach George Blackburn, the Bearcats compiled a record of 4–5. The team played home games at Nippert Stadium in Cincinnati.

== Schedule ==
Date	Opponent	Site	Result	Attendance	Source
September 22	Dayton	Nippert Stadium; Cincinnati, OH	L 13–19	22,000	
September 29	Tulsa	Nippert Stadium; Cincinnati, OH	W 7–6	17,000	
October 6	at Pacific (CA)	Pacific Memorial Stadium; Stockton, CA	L 15–21	15,500	
October 13	Xavier^{†}	Nippert Stadium; Cincinnati, OH (rivalry)	L 14–34	28,000–28,500	
October 20	at Navy	Thompson Stadium; Annapolis, MD	L 7–13	14,000	
October 27	at Marquette	Marquette Stadium; Milwaukee, WI	W 33–13	12,000–12,800	
November 3	Detroit	Nippert Stadium; Cincinnati, OH	W 33–7	16,500	
November 10	at Wichita	Nippert Stadium; Cincinnati, OH	W 21–0	16,000	
November 22	Miami (OH)	Nippert Stadium; Cincinnati, OH (Victory Bell)	L 13–27	17,000	
^{†}Homecoming; Source:
