= 1956 Colorado Buffaloes football team =

American college football season

1956 Colorado Buffaloes football

Orange Bowl champion

Orange Bowl, W 27–21 vs. Clemson
- Conference: Big Seven Conference

Ranking
- Coaches: No. 18
- AP: No. 20
- Record: 8–2–1 (4–1–1 Big 7)
- Head coach: Dallas Ward (9th season)
- Captain: Game captains
- Home stadium: Folsom Field

1956 Big Seven Conference football standings
	Conf.					Overall
Team	W		L		T	W		L		T
No. 1 Oklahoma $	6	–	0	–	0	10	–	0	–	0
No. 20 Colorado	4	–	1	–	1	8	–	2	–	1
Missouri	3	–	2	–	1	4	–	5	–	1
Nebraska	3	–	3	–	0	4	–	6	–	0
Kansas	2	–	4	–	0	3	–	6	–	1
Kansas State	2	–	4	–	0	3	–	7	–	0
Iowa State	0	–	6	–	0	2	–	8	–	0
$ – Conference champion; Rankings from AP Poll

The 1956 Colorado Buffaloes football team was an American football team that represented the University of Colorado in the Big Seven Conference during the 1956 college football season. Led by ninth-year head coach Dallas Ward, the Buffaloes compiled and overall record of 8–2–1 with a mark of 4–1–1 in conference play, placing second in the Big 7. The team played its home games on campus at Folsom Field in Boulder, Colorado.

Colorado was runner-up in the conference to undefeated Oklahoma, whose winning streak had reached 40 games and who declared the consensus national champion. The Sooners did not play in a bowl game due to the Big Seven's no-repeat rule;, so Colorado was invited to the Orange Bowl in Miami, and defeated Clemson, 27–21.

== Schedule ==
Date	Opponent	Rank	Site	TV	Result	Attendance	Source
September 22	Oregon*		Folsom Field; Boulder, CO		L 0–35	40,500	
September 29	Kansas State		Folsom Field; Boulder, CO (rivalry)		W 34–0	21,000	
October 6	at Kansas		Memorial Stadium; Lawrence, KS		W 26–25	20,000	
October 13	Colorado A&M*		Folsom Field; Boulder, CO (rivalry)		W 47–7	21,000	
October 20	at Iowa State		Clyde Williams Field; Ames, IA		W 52–0	16,000	
October 27	Nebraska^{†}		Folsom Field; Boulder, CO (rivalry)		W 16–0	45,500	
November 3	No. 1 Oklahoma		Folsom Field; Boulder, CO	NBC	L 19–27	47,000	
November 10	at Missouri	No. 18	Memorial Stadium; Columbia, MO		T 14–14	25,000	
November 17	at Utah*		Ute Stadium; Salt Lake City, UT (rivalry)		W 21–7	9,773	
November 24	at Arizona*	No. 20	Arizona Stadium; Tucson, AZ		W 38–7	12,000	
January 1	vs. No. 19 Clemson*	No. 20	Burdine Stadium; Miami, FL (Orange Bowl)		W 27–21	72,552	
*Non-conference game; ^{†}Homecoming; Rankings from AP Poll released prior to the game; Source:
