= 1956 Texas Western Miners football team =

American college football season

1956 Texas Western Miners football

Border champion

Sun Bowl, L 0–13 vs. George Washington
- Conference: Border Conference
- Record: 9–2 (5–0 Border)
- Head coach: Mike Brumbelow (7th season)
- Home stadium: Kidd Field

1956 Border Conference football standings
	Conf.					Overall
Team	W		L		T	W		L		T
Texas Western $	5	–	0	–	0	9	–	2	–	0
Arizona State	3	–	1	–	0	9	–	1	–	0
West Texas State	2	–	2	–	0	8	–	2	–	0
Arizona	1	–	2	–	0	4	–	6	–	0
Hardin–Simmons	1	–	3	–	0	4	–	6	–	0
New Mexico A&M	0	–	4	–	0	1	–	9	–	0
$ – Conference champion

The 1956 Texas Western Miners football team was an American football team that represented Texas Western College (now known as University of Texas at El Paso) as a member of the Border Conference during the 1956 college football season. In its seventh and final season under head coach Mike Brumbelow, the team compiled a 9–2 record (5–0 against Border Conference opponents), won the conference championship, and outscored all opponents by a total of 305 to 78.

The team's statistical leaders included quarterback Bob Laraba with 568 passing yards and 743 yards of total offense, Jimmy Bevers with 606 rushing yards and 54 points scored, halfback Don Maynard with 275 receiving yards, and end Bob Forrest with 849 all-purpose yards. Maynard later played 17 years of professional football and was inducted into the Pro Football Hall of Fame.

Five Texas Western players received first-team honors on the 1956 All-Border Conference team: Laraba; Maynard; Forrest; guard Ken George; and tackle Keith Wharton. Mike Brumbelow was also named Border Conference Coach of the Year.

== Schedule ==
Date	Opponent	Site	Result	Attendance	Source
September 22	at Texas Tech*	Jones Stadium; Lubbock TX	W 17–13	17,000	
September 29	Abilene Christian*	Kidd Field; El Paso, TX	W 20–0		
October 6	New Mexico*	Kidd Field; El Paso, TX	W 34–0		
October 13	Arizona	Kidd Field; El Paso, TX	W 28–6		
October 20	at North Texas State*	Fouts Field; Denton, TX	L 6–13		
October 27	at New Mexico A&M	Memorial Stadium; Las Cruces, NM	W 51–7		
November 3	Hardin–Simmons^{†}	Kidd Field; El Paso, TX	W 51–13	12,000	
November 10	at Arizona State	Goodwin Stadium; Tempe, AZ	W 28–0		
November 17	at West Texas State	Buffalo Stadium; Canyon, TX	W 16–13		
November 24	Trinity (TX)*	Kidd Field; El Paso, TX	W 54–0		
January 1	vs. No. 17 George Washington*	Kidd Field; El Paso, TX (Sun Bowl)	L 0–13	15,000	
*Non-conference game; ^{†}Homecoming; Rankings from AP Poll released prior to the game
