= 1957 Cotton Bowl Classic =

- 21st Cotton Bowl Classic
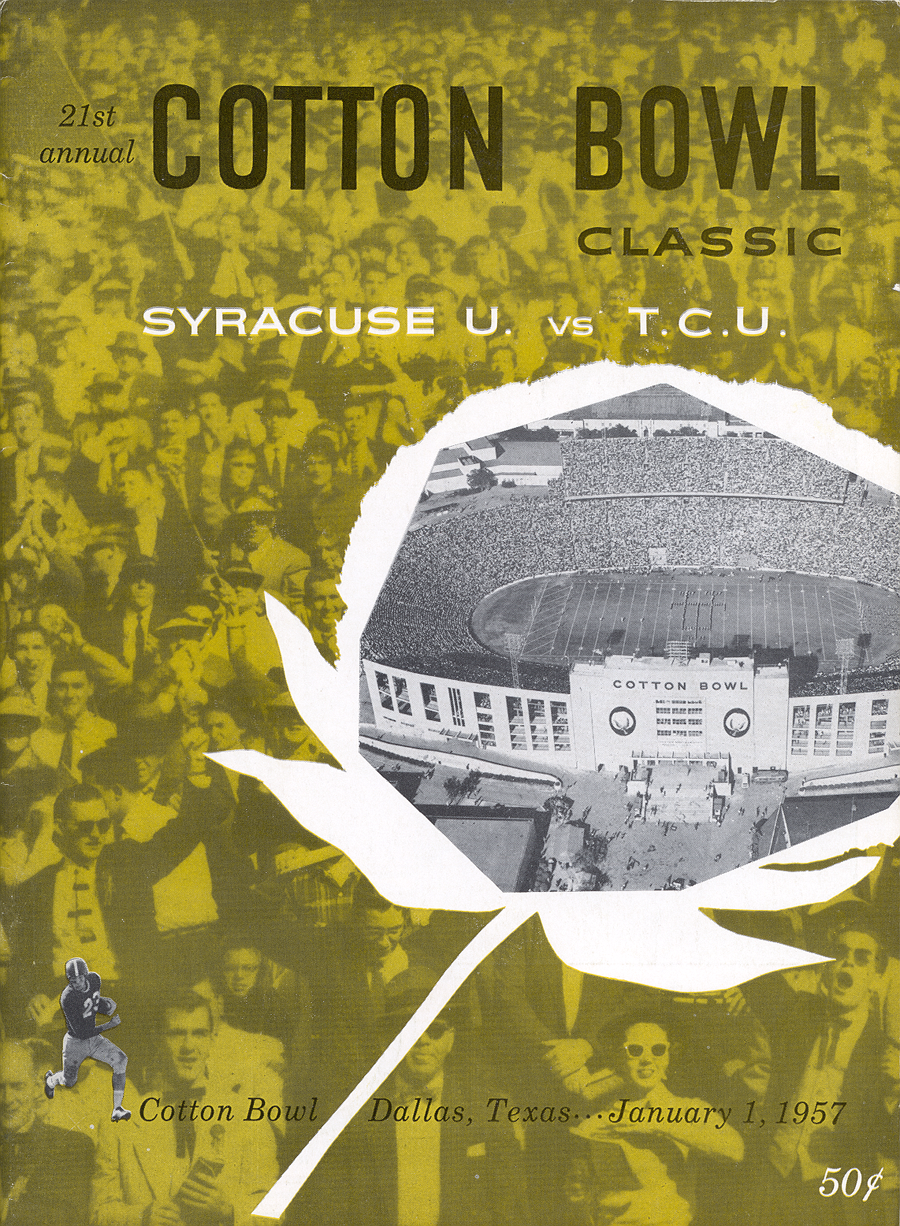
Syracuse Orangemen	TCU Horned Frogs
(7–1)	(7–3)
Independent	SWC
27	28
Head coach: Ben Schwartzwalder	Head coach: Abe Martin
AP / Coaches; 8 / 8	AP / Coaches; 14 / 14
	1	2	3	4	Total
Syracuse	0	14	0	13	27
TCU	7	7	7	7	28
- Date: January 1, 1957
- Season: 1956
- Stadium: Cotton Bowl
- Location: Dallas, Texas
- MVP: Jim Brown (Syracuse RB); Norman Hamilton (TCU T)
- Favorite: TCU by 4 points
- Referee: C.W. Davis (SWC; split crew: SWC, Independent)
- Attendance: 61,500–68,000

United States TV coverage
- Network: NBC
- Announcers: Lindsey Nelson, Red Grange

The Cotton Bowl in Dallas, Texas, hosted the Cotton Bowl Classic.

The 1957 Cotton Bowl Classic was the 21st edition of the college football bowl game, played at the Cotton Bowl in Dallas, on Tuesday, January 1. Part of the 1956–57 bowl game season, it matched the independent and eighth-ranked Syracuse Orangemen and No. 14 TCU Horned Frogs of the Southwest Conference (SWC). Favored TCU held on to win by a point, 28–27.

== Teams ==
=== Syracuse ===
The Orangemen had just one loss (in September at Pittsburgh, who lost in the Gator Bowl), but they were ranked eighth, led by senior running back Jim Brown, a consensus All-American. This was the second bowl appearance for Syracuse; their first was four years earlier in the Orange Bowl.

=== TCU ===
TCU was runner-up in the Southwest Conference, but was invited due to first place Texas A&M being under NCAA sanctions. This was the Horned Frogs' fifth Cotton Bowl appearance; they won their first in 1937 (with quarterback Sammy Baugh), but dropped their next three (1945, 1952, 1956).

== Game summary ==
TCU had two 14-point leads, both near the end of the halves. John Nikkel started the scoring for TCU with a touchdown catch from Chuck Curtis, and in the second quarter, Jim Shofner caught a touchdown to make it 14–0. But Jim Brown ran for two touchdowns in a span of 6:52 to tie the game at halftime. Late in the third quarter after Brown fumbled the ball back to TCU, Curtis scored on a touchdown run to give TCU the lead back. After another Brown fumble early in the fourth quarter, Jim Swink ran it in from three yards out to give TCU a 28–14 lead with under twelve minutes to go. Syracuse went 49 yards in 13 plays and scored on a Brown run, who lined up for his third PAT attempt of the day to narrow the lead to seven.

TCU's Chico Mendoza blocked the extra point to keep the lead at eight points. Syracuse had one last drive in them, going 43 yards in three plays. Jim Ridlon caught a 27-yard touchdown pass from Charles Zimmerman with 1:16 left, and Brown's kick narrowed the lead to 28–27. The two-point conversion was not introduced until the 1958 season. Rather than attempt the expected onside kick, Syracuse opted to kick it deep, but TCU held on and did not give up the ball, in the Horned Frogs' last bowl win until 1998. Brown (back) and Norman Hamilton (line) were named the outstanding players of the game.

=== Scoring ===
First quarter

- TCU – John Nikkel 6-yard pass from Chuck Curtis (Harold Pollard kick), 2:10

Second quarter

- TCU – Jim Shofner 8-yard pass from Curtis (Pollard kick), 13:01
- SYR – Jim Brown 2-yard run (Brown kick), 7:54
- SYR – Brown 4-yard run (Brown kick), 1:02

Third quarter

- TCU – Curtis 7-yard run (Pollard kick), 4:45

Fourth quarter

- TCU – Jim Swink 3-yard run (Pollard kick), 11:44
- SYR – Brown 1-yard run (Brown kick blocked by Chico Mendoza), 5:07
- SYR – Jim Ridlon 27-yard pass from Charles Zimmerman (Brown kick), 1:16

== Statistics ==
Statistics	TCU	Syracuse
First downs	15	16
Rushes–yards	56–133	53–235
Passing yards	202	63
Passes (C–A–I)	13–16–0	3–7–1
Total Offense	72–335	60–298
Punts–average	4–37.5	2–46.5
Fumbles–lost	3–2	3–3
Turnovers	2	4
Penalties–yards	4–40	1–5
