= 1956 Ole Miss Rebels football team =

American college football season

1956 Ole Miss Rebels football
- Conference: Southeastern Conference
- Record: 7–3 (4–2 SEC)
- Head coach: Johnny Vaught (10th season)
- Home stadium: Hemingway Stadium

1956 Southeastern Conference football standings
	Conf.					Overall
Team	W		L		T	W		L		T
No. 2 Tennessee $	6	–	0	–	0	10	–	1	–	0
No. 4 Georgia Tech	7	–	1	–	0	10	–	1	–	0
Florida	5	–	2	–	0	6	–	3	–	1
Ole Miss	4	–	2	–	0	7	–	3	–	0
Auburn	4	–	3	–	0	7	–	3	–	0
Kentucky	4	–	4	–	0	6	–	4	–	0
Tulane	3	–	3	–	0	6	–	4	–	0
Vanderbilt	2	–	5	–	0	5	–	5	–	0
Alabama	2	–	5	–	0	2	–	7	–	1
Mississippi State	2	–	5	–	0	4	–	6	–	0
LSU	1	–	5	–	0	3	–	7	–	0
Georgia	1	–	6	–	0	3	–	6	–	1
$ – Conference champion; Rankings from AP Poll

The 1956 Ole Miss Rebels football team represented the University of Mississippi during the 1956 college football season. The Rebels were led by 10th-year head coach Johnny Vaught and played their home games at Hemingway Stadium in Oxford, Mississippi (and alternate site home games in Jackson, Mississippi and Memphis, Tennessee). They competed as members of the Southeastern Conference, finishing in fourth with a record of 7–3 (4–2 SEC). They were not invited to a bowl game.

== Schedule ==
Date	Opponent	Rank	Site	Result	Attendance	Source
September 22	North Texas State*	No. 13	Hemingway Stadium; Oxford, MS	W 45–0	7,000	
September 29	Kentucky	No. 9	Crump Stadium; Memphis, TN	W 37–7	25,101	
October 6	Houston*	No. 6	Mississippi Veterans Memorial Stadium; Jackson, MS	W 14–0	26,000	
October 13	No. 13 Vanderbilt^{†}	No. 7	Hemingway Stadium; Oxford, MS (rivalry)	W 16–0	28,500	
October 20	No. 19 Tulane	No. 6	Mississippi Veterans Memorial Stadium; Jackson, MS (rivalry)	L 3–10	28,000	
October 27	at Arkansas*	No. 10	War Memorial Stadium; Little Rock, AR (rivalry)	L 0–14	35,500	
November 3	at LSU		Tiger Stadium; Baton Rouge, LA (rivalry)	W 46–17	35,000	
November 10	at Memphis State*		Crump Stadium; Memphis, TN (rivalry)	W 26–0		
November 17	at No. 1 Tennessee	No. 19	Shields–Watkins Field; Knoxville, TN (rivalry)	L 7–27		
December 1	Mississippi State		Hemingway Stadium; Oxford, MS (Egg Bowl)	W 13–7	34,000	
*Non-conference game; ^{†}Homecoming; Rankings from AP Poll released prior to the game

== Roster ==
- FB Paige Cothren, Sr.
