= 1956 Tennessee Volunteers football team =

American college football season

1956 Tennessee Volunteers football

National champion (SR) SEC champion

Sugar Bowl, L 7–13 vs. Baylor
- Conference: Southeastern Conference

Ranking
- Coaches: No. 2
- AP: No. 2
- Record: 10–1 (6–0 SEC)
- Head coach: Bowden Wyatt (2nd season)
- Home stadium: Shields–Watkins Field

1956 Southeastern Conference football standings
	Conf.					Overall
Team	W		L		T	W		L		T
No. 2 Tennessee $	6	–	0	–	0	10	–	1	–	0
No. 4 Georgia Tech	7	–	1	–	0	10	–	1	–	0
Florida	5	–	2	–	0	6	–	3	–	1
Ole Miss	4	–	2	–	0	7	–	3	–	0
Auburn	4	–	3	–	0	7	–	3	–	0
Kentucky	4	–	4	–	0	6	–	4	–	0
Tulane	3	–	3	–	0	6	–	4	–	0
Vanderbilt	2	–	5	–	0	5	–	5	–	0
Alabama	2	–	5	–	0	2	–	7	–	1
Mississippi State	2	–	5	–	0	4	–	6	–	0
LSU	1	–	5	–	0	3	–	7	–	0
Georgia	1	–	6	–	0	3	–	6	–	1
$ – Conference champion; Rankings from AP Poll

The 1956 Tennessee Volunteers football team (variously Tennessee, UT, or the Vols) represented the University of Tennessee in the 1956 college football season. Playing as a member of the Southeastern Conference (SEC), the team was led by head coach Bowden Wyatt, in his second year, and played their home games at Shields–Watkins Field in Knoxville, Tennessee. They finished the season with a record of ten wins and one loss (10–1 overall, 6–0 in the SEC), as SEC Champions and with a loss against Baylor in the Sugar Bowl. The Volunteers offense scored 275 points while the defense allowed 88 points.

== Schedule ==
Date	Opponent	Rank	Site	TV	Result	Attendance	Source
September 29	at Auburn		Legion Field; Birmingham, AL (rivalry)		W 35–7	44,000	
October 6	at Duke*	No. 9	Duke Stadium; Durham, NC		W 33–20	22,000	
October 13	Chattanooga*	No. 6	Shields–Watkins Field; Knoxville, TN		W 42–20	20,000	
October 20	Alabama	No. 7	Shields–Watkins Field; Knoxville, TN (Third Saturday in October)		W 24–0	27,500	
October 27	Maryland*	No. 4	Shields–Watkins Field; Knoxville, TN		W 34–7	33,500	
November 1	North Carolina*^{†}	No. 3	Shields–Watkins Field; Knoxville, TN		W 20–0	27,000	
November 10	at No. 2 Georgia Tech	No. 3	Grant Field; Atlanta, GA (rivalry)		W 6–0	40,000	
November 17	No. 19 Ole Miss	No. 1	Shields–Watkins Field; Knoxville, TN (rivalry)		W 27–7		
November 24	Kentucky	No. 2	Shields–Watkins Field; Knoxville, TN (rivalry)		W 20–7	45,000	
December 1	at Vanderbilt	No. 2	Dudley Field; Nashville, TN (rivalry)		W 27–7	28,000	
January 1	vs. No. 13 Baylor	No. 2	Tulane Stadium; New Orleans, LA (Sugar Bowl)	ABC	L 7–13	81,000	
*Non-conference game; ^{†}Homecoming; Rankings from AP Poll released prior to the game

== Roster ==
- HB #45 Johnny Majors, Sr.

== Team players drafted into the NFL ==
Player	Position	Round	Pick	NFL club
John Gordy	Tackle	2	24	Detroit Lions
Frank Kolinsky	Tackle	28	329	Pittsburgh Steelers
