= 1956 Vanderbilt Commodores football team =

American college football season

1956 Vanderbilt Commodores football
- Conference: Southeastern Conference
- Record: 5–5 (2–5 SEC)
- Head coach: Art Guepe (4th season)
- Captains: Don Orr; Art Demmas
- Home stadium: Dudley Field

1956 Southeastern Conference football standings
	Conf.					Overall
Team	W		L		T	W		L		T
No. 2 Tennessee $	6	–	0	–	0	10	–	1	–	0
No. 4 Georgia Tech	7	–	1	–	0	10	–	1	–	0
Florida	5	–	2	–	0	6	–	3	–	1
Ole Miss	4	–	2	–	0	7	–	3	–	0
Auburn	4	–	3	–	0	7	–	3	–	0
Kentucky	4	–	4	–	0	6	–	4	–	0
Tulane	3	–	3	–	0	6	–	4	–	0
Vanderbilt	2	–	5	–	0	5	–	5	–	0
Alabama	2	–	5	–	0	2	–	7	–	1
Mississippi State	2	–	5	–	0	4	–	6	–	0
LSU	1	–	5	–	0	3	–	7	–	0
Georgia	1	–	6	–	0	3	–	6	–	1
$ – Conference champion; Rankings from AP Poll

The 1956 Vanderbilt Commodores football team represented Vanderbilt University during the 1956 college football season. The team's head coach was Art Guepe, who was in his fourth year as the Commodores' head coach. Members of the Southeastern Conference, the Commodores played their home games at Dudley Field in Nashville, Tennessee. In 1956, Vanderbilt went 5–5 overall with a conference record of 2–5.

== Schedule ==
Date	Opponent	Rank	Site	Result	Attendance	Source
September 22	Georgia		Dudley Field; Nashville, TN (rivalry)	W 14–0	28,000	
September 29	Chattanooga*	No. 15	Dudley Field; Nashville, TN	W 46–7	17,500	
October 6	at Alabama	No. 18	Ladd Stadium; Mobile, AL	W 32–7	23,071	
October 13	at No. 7 Ole Miss	No. 13	Hemingway Stadium; Oxford, MS (rivalry)	L 0–16	28,500	
October 20	Florida		Dudley Field; Nashville, TN	L 7–21	24,000	
October 27	Middle Tennessee*		Dudley Field; Nashville, TN	W 23–13		
November 3	at Virginia*		Scott Stadium; Charlottesville, VA	W 6–2	8,000	
November 10	at Kentucky^{†}		McLean Stadium; Lexington, KY (rivalry)	L 6–7		
November 17	Tulane		Dudley Field; Nashville, TN	L 6–13	22,000	
December 1	No. 2 Tennessee		Dudley Field; Nashville, TN (rivalry)	L 7–27	28,000	
*Non-conference game; ^{†}Homecoming; Rankings from AP Poll released prior to the game
