= Tennessee Volunteers football rivalries =

Tennessee Volunteers football rivalries refers to the college football rivalries for the University of Tennessee in the sport of college football. As one of college football's winningest teams, and a founding member of the SEC in 1933, Tennessee has developed several long and historic rivalries.

== Historical rivals ==
Throughout their history, Tennessee has developed three main historical rivals, who they have played over 100 times each. These series are with Alabama, Kentucky, and Vanderbilt.

=== Alabama ===
Tennessee Volunteers football rivalries
- Alabama Crimson Tide Tennessee Volunteers
- First meeting: November 28, 1901; Tennessee 6, Alabama 6
- Latest meeting: October 17, 2026; Tennessee 26, Alabama 10
- Next meeting: 2027

Statistics
- Total meetings: 109
- All-time series: Alabama leads, 61–41–7
- Largest victory: Alabama, 51–0 (1906)
- Longest win streak: Alabama, 15 (2007–2021)
- Current win streak: Tennessee, 1 (2026–present)

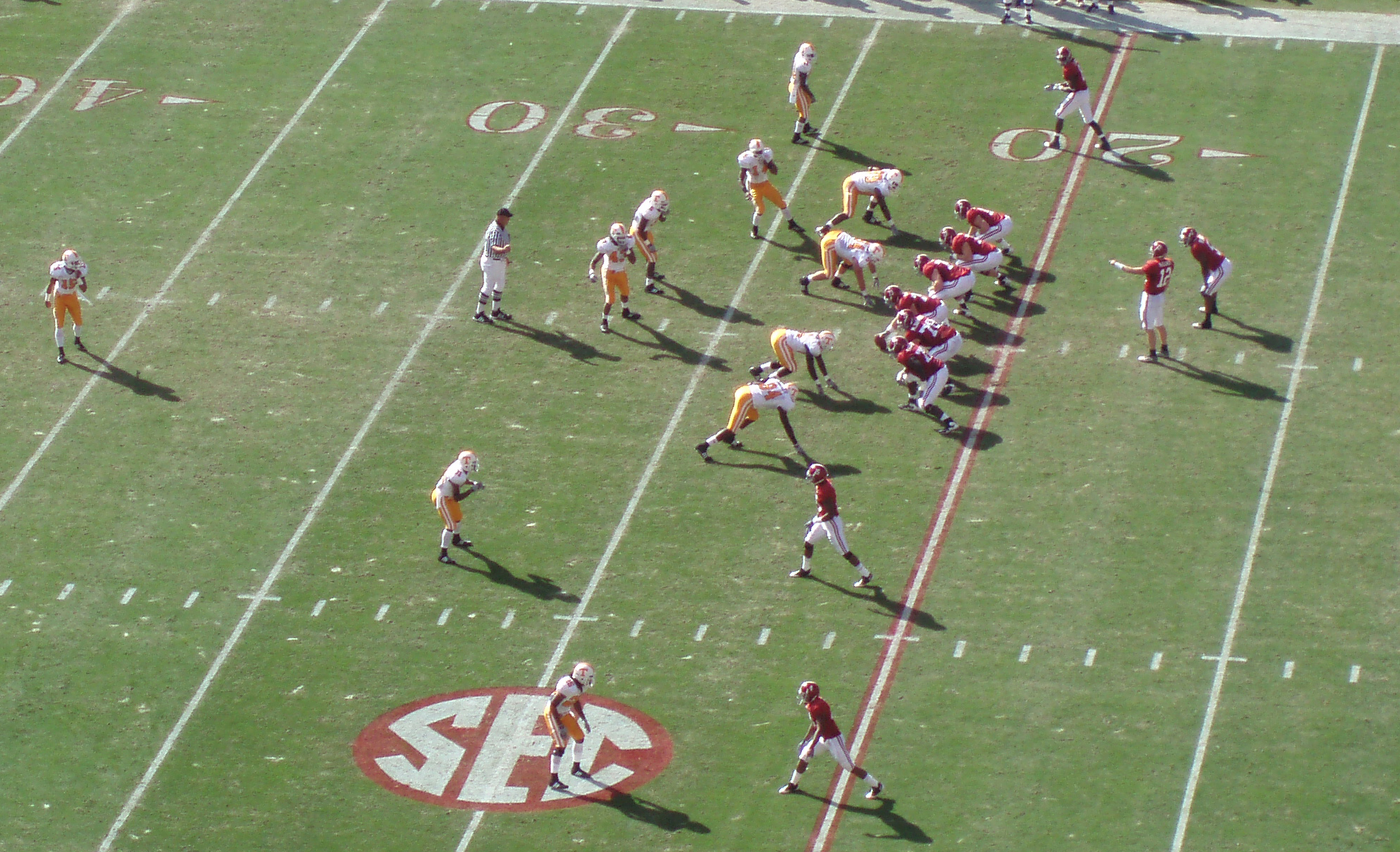
Alabama on offense versus Tennessee in Tuscaloosa during the 2009 season

Despite the heated in-state rivalry with Auburn, former Alabama head coach Bear Bryant was more adamant about defeating his rivals to the north, the Tennessee Vols. The series is named the Third Saturday in October, the date on which the game was historically played. Despite the name, the game was played on the third Saturday just five times between 1995 and 2007.

The first game between the two sides was played in 1901 in Birmingham, ending in a 6–6 tie. From 1902 to 1913, Alabama dominated the series, losing only once, and never allowing a touchdown by the Volunteers. Beginning in 1928, the rivalry was first played on its traditional date and began to be a challenge for the Tide as Robert Neyland began competing with Alabama for their perennial spot on top of the conference standings.

In the 1950s, Jim Goostree, the head trainer for Alabama, began a tradition by handing out cigars following a victory over the Volunteers.

Between 1971 and 1981, Alabama held an 11-game winning streak over the Volunteers and, between 1986 and 1994, a nine-game unbeaten streak. However, following Alabama's streak, Tennessee responded with a seven-game winning streak from 1995 to 2001.

On October 25, 2003, Tennessee defeated Alabama at Bryant-Denny Stadium 51-43 after 5 overtimes. Quarterback Casey Clausen scored the winning touchdown on a 1-yard sneak across the goal line. This was the most overtimes against Alabama in program history and the second most overall after a 41–38 win over Arkansas in 6 overtimes on October 5, 2002.

Alabama won 15 consecutive games from 2007 to 2021. In 2022, #6 Tennessee won 52–49 on a last second field goal to claim its first game against #3 Alabama in 16 years. The win kept Tennessee undefeated, and fans stormed the field of Neyland Stadium in celebration Alabama is Tennessee's third most-played opponent, after Kentucky and Vanderbilt. Tennessee is Alabama's second-most played opponent after Mississippi State.

=== Kentucky ===
Tennessee Volunteers football rivalries
- Kentucky Wildcats Tennessee Volunteers
- First meeting: October 21, 1893; Kentucky, 56–0
- Latest meeting: November 7, 2026; Tennessee, 34–6
- Trophy: Beer Barrel (1925–1999)

Statistics
- Total meetings: 122
- All-time series: Tennessee leads 86–26–9
- Largest victory: Kentucky, 56–0 (1893)
- Longest win streak: Tennessee, 26 (1985–2010)
- Current win streak: Tennessee, 6 (2021–present)

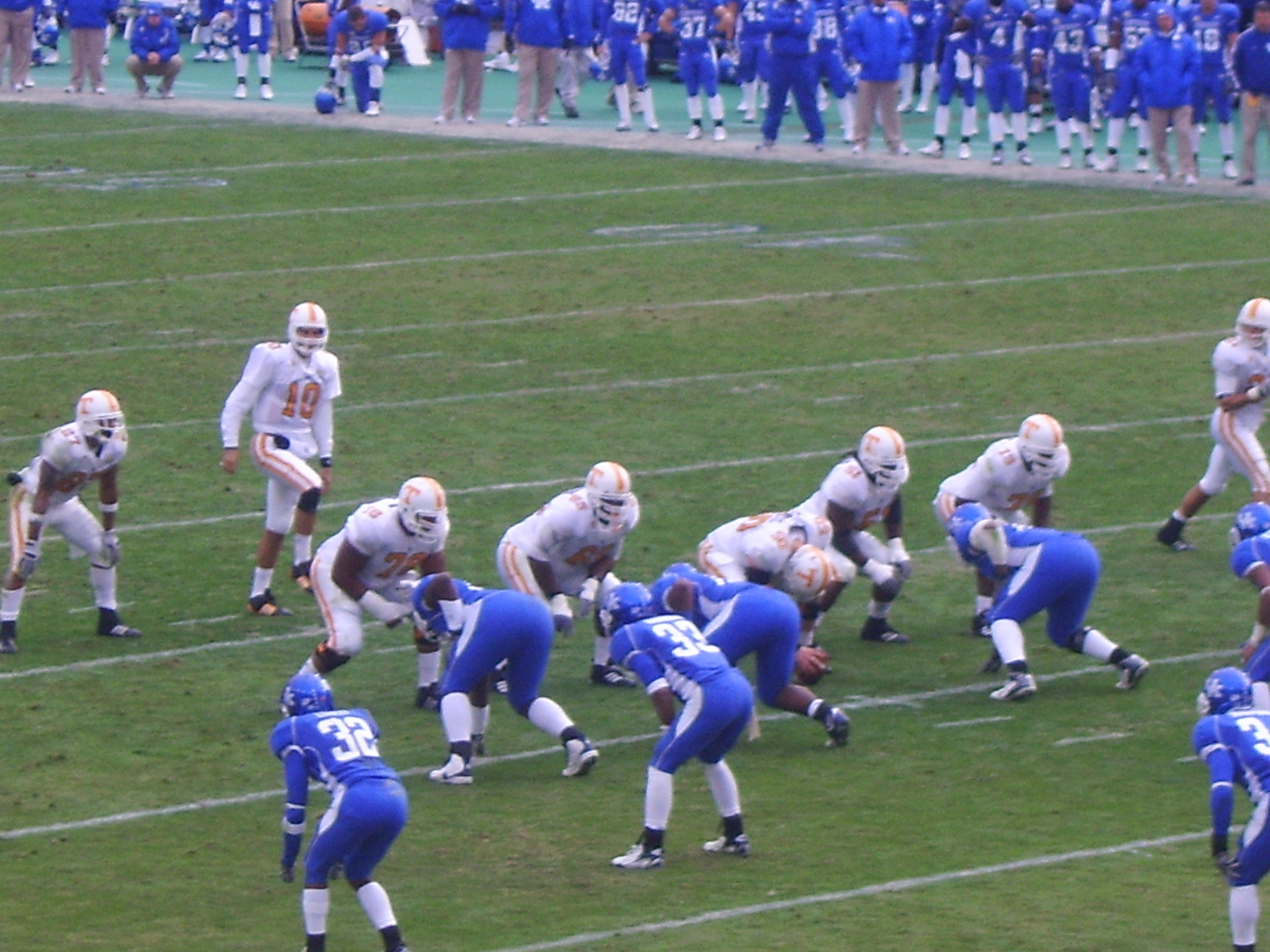
Tennessee vs Kentucky 2007

Tennessee and Kentucky have played each other 118 times over 130 years, making it one of the oldest series in major college football. The two schools are each other's most commonly played opponent. The game is usually played in November, as one of the last two games of the season. Only 7 of their meetings have played outside that month, although 4 of these instances have occurred since 2015. Tennessee has dominated the series historically, leading 84–26–9 (.744). Current Kentucky Coach Mark Stoops Stoops holds a 2–9 record vs. Tennessee, while Josh Heupel is 3–0.

Tennessee Kentucky game is unique in that it is Tennessee's only rivalry series to have exchanged a trophy to the winner: a wooden beer barrel painted half blue and half orange. The trophy was awarded to the winner of the game every year from 1925 to 1997. The Barrel was introduced in 1925 by a group of former Kentucky students who wanted to create a material sign of supremacy for the rivalry. It was rolled onto the field that year with the words "Ice Water" painted on it to avoid any outcries over a beer keg symbolizing a college rivalry during the Prohibition era. After losing to Kentucky in 1953, a group of Tennessee students stole the barrel, prompting Kentucky students to steal Tennessee's mascot Smokey for a short time before both sides yielded. The barrel was again stolen from Kentucky in 1960 when a group of Vanderbilt students before a basketball game between the two schools before being returned. The barrel exchange ended in 1998 after two Kentucky football players died in an alcohol-related crash. The barrel is believed to be in possession of Tennessee who won the last meeting before the trophy was retired.

From 1985 to 2010, Tennessee held a 26-game winning streak over Kentucky, until 2011 when the Wildcats beat UT 10–7 in Lexington. The 2020 meeting featured a pandemic-era capacity reduced crowd where Kentucky won its first game in Neyland stadium since 1984. Despite the 118 meetings between the two teams, they have meet with both teams ranked in the Top 25 only three times (1950, 1951, 2022), all three which were won by Tennessee. Notably, the 1950 meeting allowed both teams to finish with 11–1 records. The two teams met on one of the coldest days in Knoxville history, with a kickoff temperature of around 5 degrees. Notably, Kentucky coach Bear Bryant opted for his team to reject wearing layers of clothes as he believed it slowed them down. Tennessee instead wore thick layers and used heating equipment on the sideline. The game featured 18 turnovers, in part fueled by snow throughout the game. A 2nd quarter touchdown by Tennessee receiver Bert Rechichar on a 4th and long proved the difference in a Tennessee 7–0 win. The loss was the only one for Kentucky all year, and denied them a consensus national championship. Notably, both schools claim a share of the national championship for that season.

=== Vanderbilt ===
Tennessee Volunteers football rivalries
- Tennessee Volunteers Vanderbilt Commodores
- First meeting: October 21, 1892; Vanderbilt, 22–4
- Latest meeting: November 29, 2025; Tennessee, 23-36
- Next meeting: November 28, 2026

Statistics
- Total meetings: 120
- All-time series: Tennessee leads, 79–33–5
- Largest victory: Vanderbilt, 76–0 (1918)
- Longest win streak: Tennessee, 22 (1983–2004)
- Current win streak: Vanderbilt, 1 (2025–present)

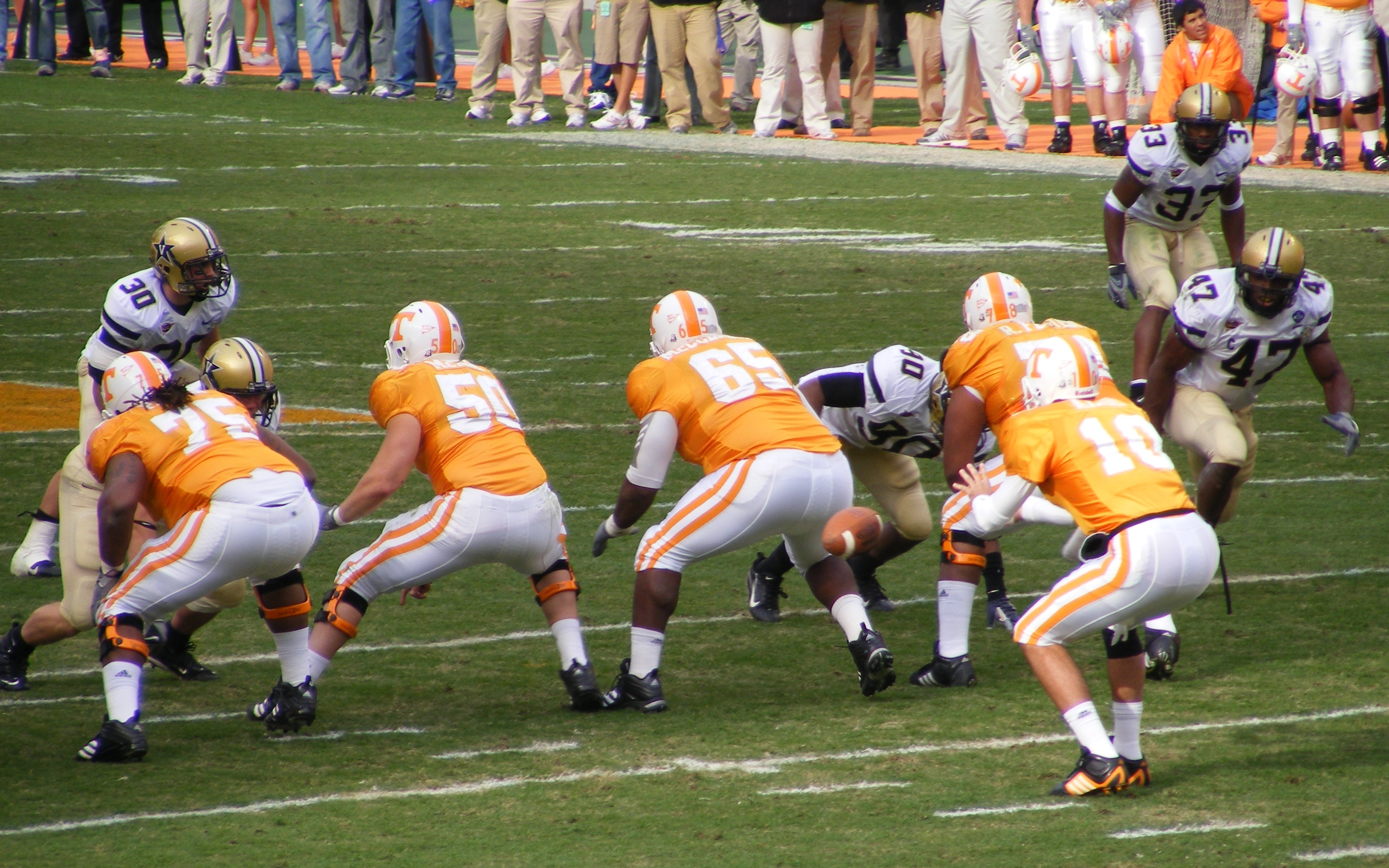
Tennessee vs. Vanderbilt 2007

Vanderbilt and Tennessee have played 118 times since 1892, with Tennessee holding an all-time winning record of 77–32–5. Tennessee is Vanderbilt's most played opponent, while it is the second most played series for Tennessee, trailing Kentucky by just one game (although Tennessee–Vanderbilt is one year older). Since 1925, the series has always been played in November or December, and is traditionally the last game of the season, played on the weekend after Thanksgiving.

When the rivalry first started, Vanderbilt dominated by taking 19 of the first 24 with three ties (.854). Vanderbilt and Tennessee played two games in 1892, both won by Vanderbilt. Tennessee's first victory over Vanderbilt was the 1914 meeting in Knoxville, by a score of 16–14. From 1892 to 1927, Vanderbilt out-scored Tennessee 561–83 (23.4) to (3.4). In 1926, chairman of the UT Athletic Council Nathan Dougherty instructed newly hired coach Robert Neyland to even the score with Vanderbilt. Neyland went on to do just that, beginning an era where Tennessee became far and away the superior team.

Since the 1928 season, UT has dominated the rivalry, although Vanderbilt found more success in a stretch from 2012 to 2017, where the Commodores won 5 out of 7 games against the Vols. Some notable meetings from this stretch include the 2012 Vanderbilt win which resulted in the firing of Derek Dooley the next day. The 2016 game which saw 8–3, #17 Tennessee lose 45–34 to a 5–6 Vanderbilt team which cost the Vols a bid to the Sugar Bowl, and ensured Vanderbilt's bowl eligibility. Additionally, the 2017 Vanderbilt win gave Tennessee their first ever season with 8 losses, and their first season where they went winless in SEC play. Finally, the 2018 meeting was a contest of two 5–6 teams fighting for bowl eligibility. Vanderbilt won 38–13 marking their first three-game winning streak in the series since 1926. Tennessee has since won 4 games in a row, with the most recent 2022 win coming at a score of 56–0 to reach 10 wins for the first time since 2003 while dropping Vanderbilt to 5–7 and prevent the Commodores from reaching a bowl game. The next meeting is scheduled for November 25, 2023.

== SEC expansion–era rivalries ==
Since the formation of the SEC Eastern Division in 1992, the Vols have had important rivalries with Florida, Georgia, and South Carolina. These four teams have combined to win the SEC East in all but two seasons (Missouri: 2013 & 2014), and these series are often crucial in determining the East winner.

=== Florida ===
Tennessee Volunteers football rivalries
- Florida Gators Tennessee Volunteers
- First meeting: October 28, 1916; Tennessee, 24–0
- Latest meeting: November 22, 2025; Tennessee, 31-11
- Next meeting: 2027 (Knoxville)

Statistics
- Total meetings: 55
- All-time series: Florida leads, 32–23
- Largest victory: Tennessee, 45–3 (1990)
- Longest win streak: Florida, 11 (2005–2015)
- Current win streak: Tennessee, 2 (2025–present)

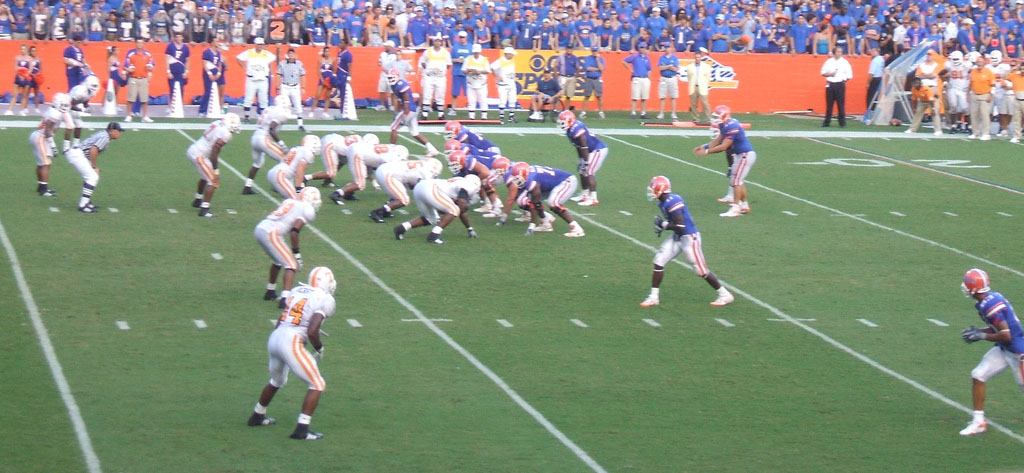
Vols vs Gators 2007

The Gators and Vols first met on the gridiron in 1916, and have competed in the same conference since Florida joined Tennessee in the now-defunct Southern Intercollegiate Athletic Association in 1912. However, a true rivalry has developed only relatively recently due to infrequent match-ups in past decades; in the first 76 years (1916–1991), the two teams met just 21 times. This changed in 1992, when the Southeastern Conference (SEC) expanded to 12 universities and split into two divisions. Florida and Tennessee were both placed in the SEC's Eastern Division, and have met annually on the football field since 1992. The rivalry quickly blossomed in intensity and importance, as both squads were perennial championship contenders throughout the 1990s. The first 10 SEC Championship Games, and 15 of the first 18, included either Tennessee or Florida from the East, and the game frequently proved pivotal to deciding the division champion.

The games' national implications diminished in the 2000s, as first Tennessee and then Florida suffered through sub-par seasons. However, the intensity of each meeting still remains one of the highest in college football. Starting in 2005, Florida went on an 11-game win streak as Tennessee struggled under coaches Derek Dooley and Butch Jones. The game did receive national interest again in 2016 and 2017, where both matchups featured ranked teams, with Tennessee ending Florida's steak in Knoxville in 2016. However, Florida again took control winning 5 straight from 2017 to 2021. The most recent matchup saw #8 Tennessee defeat Florida 23–17 in overtime on October 12, 2024. Florida leads the series 32–22 through the 2024 season, with the next meeting set in 2025. The future of the rivalry is uncertain following recent SEC Expansion, and the end of the SEC East, which could end annual meetings between the two schools. They were selected to meet in 2024 and 2025 as part of and SEC effort to protect current rivalries while determining a permanent scheduling model.

=== Georgia ===
Tennessee Volunteers football rivalries
- Georgia Bulldogs Tennessee Volunteers
- First meeting: November 11, 1899; Tennessee, 5–0
- Latest meeting: November 16, 2024; Georgia, 31–17
- Next meeting: 2025

Statistics
- Total meetings: 54
- All-time series: Georgia leads 29–23–2
- Largest victory: Tennessee, 46–0 (1936)
- Longest win streak: Tennessee, 9 (1989–1999)
- Current win streak: Georgia, 8 (2017–present)

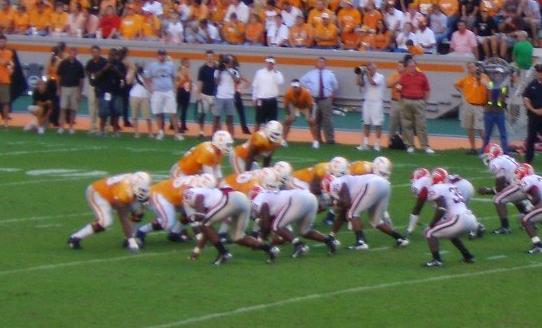
Tennessee/Georgia 2007

The Bulldogs and Vols first met in 1899, a UT victory in Knoxville. The teams played sporadically over the next several years before playing five straight games from 1907 to 1910, four straight from 1922 to 1925, and then putting the rivalry on hiatus for more than 30 years after the 1937 game in Knoxville, a UT victory. When the two played each other in 1968 in Knoxville, the game ended in a tie (only the second tie game after the 1906 game in Athens). This game was the first game where artificial turf was installed at Neyland Stadium. The two teams continued to play each other sporadically through the 1970s and '80s, with Georgia winning four straight games from 1973 to 1988. The Volunteers won at home against the Bulldogs in 1989, the last meeting between the two teams before the SEC split the conference into two divisions, and left Georgia with the series lead 10–9–2.

From 1992 onward, the Vols and Bulldogs have played each other every year, often with major implications in the SEC East race. Additionally, the schools are 2nd (Tennessee) and 3rd (Georgia) in the SEC for all-time wins and winning percentage, additionally Georgia is 2nd the SEC with 14 SEC Championships, while Tennessee is 3rd with 13, and both schools are 2nd (Tennessee) and 3rd (Georgia) in claimed national championships. Combined they have represented the SEC East 15 out of the 31 times in the SEC Championship (Georgia has 10 appearances, Tennessee 5). Tennessee won the first 8 of their meetings as East opponents in a run from 1992 to 1999. Notably the only recorded instance of fans rushing the field at Sanford Stadium came when #19 Georgia ended the streak, beating #21 Tennessee in 2000. Tennessee's next win at Georgia came in 2004, when the #17 Vols upset #3 Georgia 19–14, ending the Bulldog's 17 game home win streak, and helping to propel the Vols to the SEC Championship Game. Tennessee ended Georgia's 5-game winning streak in 2015 with a 38–31 win over the Bulldogs in Knoxville. Tennessee brought more fireworks in the next year, beating the Bulldogs in Georgia by the score of 34–31, coming from behind to win on a hail mary pass as time expired. That play was considered one of the top plays in all of college football that year, and is one of the most memorable plays in Tennessee history. In 2017, Georgia won 41–0 in Knoxville, resulting in Tennessee's worst home loss in 112 years. In 2022, Tennessee entered the game #1 in the CFP rankings, with Georgia right behind at #3. Ultimately Georgia would win 27–13, in a game that ultimately decided the SEC East and had major implications nationally, as Tennessee would fail to make the CFP. Georgia is currently on an 8-game win steak and now leads the series 29–23–2 as of the 2024 season. Like the Florida series, the future of the rivalry beyond 2025 is uncertain due to scheduling changes associated with the SEC's addition of Oklahoma and Texas.

=== South Carolina ===
Tennessee Volunteers football rivalries
- South Carolina Gamecocks Tennessee Volunteers
- First meeting: October 29, 1903; South Carolina, 24–0
- Latest meeting: October 24, 2026; South Carolina, 27-24

Statistics
- Total meetings: 43
- All-time series: Tennessee leads, 26–12–2
- Largest victory: Tennessee, 52–0 (1929)
- Longest win streak: Tennessee, 12 (1993–2004)
- Current win streak: South Carolina, 1 (2026–present)

South Carolina and Tennessee first met in 1903, a 10–0 win for the Gamecocks. The two teams played sparingly, with only 10 meetings total until the SEC's addition of South Carolina in 1992. From 1992–2023, the two teams played annually. The series is notably for its number of streaks, as well as the close nature of the games, with each meeting between 2012 and 2018 being a one score game. After a shocking 24–23 upset 1992 win for South Carolina, which cost Tennessee the East divisional championship, Tennessee took control of the contests, winning 12 straight. Since Steve Spurrier's first South Carolina team beat Tennessee 16–15 in 2005, the series is tied 9–9. The series is also known for its pattern of win streaks, which turned several times in the 2000s. South Carolina took three straight from 2010 to 2012, followed by won 3 in a row from Tennessee in 2013–2015. The Gamecocks followed this with another three game win streak from 2016 to 2019, before Tennessee again won three in a row from 2019 to 2021 (although two of these victories were later vacated).

The 2013 meeting was notable, as a major Tennessee upset over #9 South Carolina cost the Gamecocks the SEC East and a chance to play their way into the National Championship. Similarly in 2016, a 24–21 South Carolina win over #18 Tennessee cost the Vols the SEC East. And in the November 2022 meeting, unranked South Carolina beat #5 Tennessee 63–38 to eliminate Tennessee from the CFP race. The series ended its annual meetings after the 2023 game due to changes in the SEC schedule caused by the conference's additions of Oklahoma and Texas. 2024 season was the first since 1991 where the schools did not play.

== Pre-expansion rivalries ==
The Volunteers had important rivalries with Auburn, Georgia Tech, and Ole Miss until Georgia Tech left the SEC and conference realignment forced them to drop Auburn and Ole Miss from the schedule annually.

=== Auburn ===
Tennessee Volunteers football rivalries
- Auburn Tigers Tennessee Volunteers
- First meeting: November 10, 1900; Auburn, 23–0
- Latest meeting: November 21, 2020; Auburn, 30–17
- Next meeting: 2025

Statistics
- Total meetings: 54
- All-time series: Auburn leads, 29–22–3
- Largest victory: Tennessee, 42–0 (1980)
- Longest win streak: Auburn, 6 (2003–13)
- Current win streak: Auburn, 1 (2020–present)

The Tigers and Vols first met in 1900; however, they only met 7 times before 1956, when both schools began playing annually. The two teams traditionally met on the last Saturday in September, with only the November 1968 meeting being played on a different weekend. One of the series most known games came in 1972 when unranked Auburn upset a #4 Tennessee team 10–6 at Legion Field. The matchups frequently served as an early test and preview for the rest of the season, and often featured ranked matchups. In the 1980s, the rivalry was known for its two hall of fame coaches in Pat Dye and Johnny Majors. Another notable upset came in 1985 SEC opener when unranked Tennessee held eventual Heisman Trophy winner Bo Jackson to just 80 rushing yards and defeated #1 Auburn 38–20. This helped Tennessee eventually claim an SEC Championship and a Sugar Bowl berth.

Annual meetings continued until 1991 when the SEC split into two divisions. Tennessee was given Alabama and Arkansas as their cross-division rivals, while Auburn kept their historic series with Georgia and Florida. Although the second cross-division rivalry was scrapped in 2005, the schools still continue to meet occasionally through the SEC's scheduling model, with 11 meetings since the split. The most notable contests since then have been their two meetings in SEC Championship Games. These games came in 1997 (Tennessee 30–29 victory) and 2004 (Auburn 38–28 victory). Auburn leads the series 29–22–3 through the 2020 season. The most recent meeting saw #23 Auburn defeat Tennessee 30–17 on November 21, 2020. They are likely to meet more often as a result of SEC Expansion as the league's top two long-term models feature teams playing home and away games twice every four years.

=== Georgia Tech ===
Tennessee Volunteers football rivalries
- Georgia Tech Yellow Jackets Tennessee Volunteers
- First meeting: November 22, 1902; Tennessee, 10–6
- Latest meeting: September 4, 2017; Tennessee, 42–41

Statistics
- Total meetings: 44
- All-time series: Tennessee leads, 25–17–2
- Largest victory: Georgia Tech, 45–0 (1905)
- Longest win streak: Tennessee, 8 (1967–1976)
- Current win streak: Tennessee, 2 (1987–present)

Georgia Tech and Tennessee have played 44 times since 1902, with Tennessee leading the series 25–17–2. The two schools are among college football's most historic programs all time and they hold a combined 10 national championships (Georgia Tech has 4, Tennessee with 6). When Georgia Tech was part of the SEC, both teams met frequently, meeting from 1946 to 1949, then again from 1954 to 1987 (with the exception of 1974, 1975, 1978). When Georgia Tech left the SEC in 1963, the Yellow Jackets were able to continue playing their SEC rivals, Auburn, Georgia, and Tennessee as an independent. However, with Georgia Tech's move to the ACC in 1983, it became more complicated to schedule these meetings. With the ACC's increase in conference games coming in 1988, Georgia Tech ended annual meetings with Auburn and Tennessee.

The schools met several times with one or both teams ranked in the AP poll, and was of national interest in the 1950s and 60s. Part of the rivalry stemmed from legendary Georgia Tech coach Bobby Dodd who played for Robert Neyland at Tennessee. In the 1940s several of the matchups pitted former player vs. coach. The 1956 meeting saw #2 Georgia Tech face #3 Tennessee, where a Vols win cost Georgia Tech an SEC championship and a consensus national championship, instead allowing Tennessee to reach the Sugar Bowl. The two teams renewed their rivalry on September 4, 2017, in a Chick-fil-A Kickoff Game game that ended in a thrilling 42–41 (in two overtimes) win by the Volunteers.
