= 1956 Miami Hurricanes football team =

American college football season

1956 Miami Hurricanes football
- Conference: Independent

Ranking
- Coaches: No. 6
- AP: No. 6
- Record: 8–1–1
- Head coach: Andy Gustafson (9th season)
- Home stadium: Burdine Stadium

1956 Southern major college football independents records
	Conf.			Overall
Team	W	L	T	W		L		T
No. 6 Miami (FL)		–		8	–	1	–	1
No. 16 Navy		–		6	–	1	–	2
Florida State		–		5	–	4	–	1
Texas Tech		–		2	–	7	–	1
Rankings from AP poll

The 1956 Miami Hurricanes football team represented the University of Miami as an independent during the 1956 college football season. Led by ninth-year head coach Andy Gustafson, the Hurricanes played their home games at Burdine Stadium in Miami, Florida. Miami finished the season 8–1–1.

== Schedule ==
Date	Opponent	Rank	Site	Result	Attendance	Source
September 28	No. 17 South Carolina		Burdine Stadium; Miami, FL	W 14–6	44,184	
October 5	Boston College	No. 13	Burdine Stadium; Miami, FL	W 27–6	37,381	
October 12	Maryland	No. 11	Burdine Stadium; Miami, FL	W 13–6	44,304	
October 19	Georgia	No. 11	Burdine Stadium; Miami, FL	T 7–7	42,682	
October 27	at No. 10 TCU	No. 19	Amon G. Carter Stadium; Fort Worth, TX	W 14–0	23,000–25,000	
November 2	Florida State	No. 9	Burdine Stadium; Miami, FL (rivalry)	W 20–7	36,925	
November 16	No. 13 Clemson	No. 8	Burdine Stadium; Miami, FL	W 21–0	47,603	
November 23	West Virginia	No. 6	Burdine Stadium; Miami, FL	W 18–0	37,073	
December 1	No. 18 Florida	No. 6	Florida Field; Gainesville, FL (rivalry)	W 20–7	40,000	
December 8	No. 12 Pittsburgh	No. 6	Burdine Stadium; Miami, FL	L 7–14	38,243	
Rankings from AP Poll released prior to the game
