= 1956 Mississippi State Maroons football team =

American college football season

1956 Mississippi State Maroons football
- Conference: Southeastern Conference
- Record: 4–6 (2–5 SEC)
- Head coach: Wade Walker (1st season)
- Home stadium: Scott Field

1956 Southeastern Conference football standings
	Conf.					Overall
Team	W		L		T	W		L		T
No. 2 Tennessee $	6	–	0	–	0	10	–	1	–	0
No. 4 Georgia Tech	7	–	1	–	0	10	–	1	–	0
Florida	5	–	2	–	0	6	–	3	–	1
Ole Miss	4	–	2	–	0	7	–	3	–	0
Auburn	4	–	3	–	0	7	–	3	–	0
Kentucky	4	–	4	–	0	6	–	4	–	0
Tulane	3	–	3	–	0	6	–	4	–	0
Vanderbilt	2	–	5	–	0	5	–	5	–	0
Alabama	2	–	5	–	0	2	–	7	–	1
Mississippi State	2	–	5	–	0	4	–	6	–	0
LSU	1	–	5	–	0	3	–	7	–	0
Georgia	1	–	6	–	0	3	–	6	–	1
$ – Conference champion; Rankings from AP Poll

The 1956 Mississippi State Maroons football team was an American football team that represented Mississippi State College (now known as Mississippi State University) as a member of the Southeastern Conference (SEC) during the 1956 college football season. In their first year under head coach Wade Walker, the team compiled an overall record of 4–6, with a mark of 2–5 in conference play, and placed tied for eighth in the SEC.

== Schedule ==
Date	Opponent	Site	Result	Attendance	Source
September 22	Florida	Scott Field; Starkville, MS	L 0–26		
September 29	at Houston*	Rice Stadium; Houston, TX	L 7–18	56,000	
October 6	at Georgia	Sanford Stadium; Athens, GA	W 19–7	20,000	
October 13	Trinity (TX)*	Scott Field; Starkville, MS	W 18–6	9,000	
October 20	Arkansas State*	Scott Field; Starkville, MS	W 19–9		
October 27	at Alabama	Denny Stadium; Tuscaloosa, AL (rivalry)	L 12–13	26,000	
November 3	at Tulane	Tulane Stadium; New Orleans, LA	L 14–20		
November 10	at Auburn	Cliff Hare Stadium; Auburn, AL	L 20–27	32,000	
November 17	at LSU	Tiger Stadium; Baton Rouge, LA (rivalry)	W 32–13	25,000	
December 1	at Ole Miss	Hemingway Stadium; Oxford, MS (Egg Bowl)	L 7–13	34,000	
*Non-conference game
