= 1956 Georgia Bulldogs football team =

American college football season

1956 Georgia Bulldogs football
- Conference: Southeastern Conference
- Record: 3–6–1 (1–6 SEC)
- Head coach: Wally Butts (18th season)
- Home stadium: Sanford Stadium

1956 Southeastern Conference football standings
	Conf.					Overall
Team	W		L		T	W		L		T
No. 2 Tennessee $	6	–	0	–	0	10	–	1	–	0
No. 4 Georgia Tech	7	–	1	–	0	10	–	1	–	0
Florida	5	–	2	–	0	6	–	3	–	1
Ole Miss	4	–	2	–	0	7	–	3	–	0
Auburn	4	–	3	–	0	7	–	3	–	0
Kentucky	4	–	4	–	0	6	–	4	–	0
Tulane	3	–	3	–	0	6	–	4	–	0
Vanderbilt	2	–	5	–	0	5	–	5	–	0
Alabama	2	–	5	–	0	2	–	7	–	1
Mississippi State	2	–	5	–	0	4	–	6	–	0
LSU	1	–	5	–	0	3	–	7	–	0
Georgia	1	–	6	–	0	3	–	6	–	1
$ – Conference champion; Rankings from AP Poll

The 1956 Georgia Bulldogs football team was an American football team that represented the University of Georgia as a member of the Southeastern Conference (SEC) during the 1956 college football season. In their 18th year under head coach Wally Butts, the Bulldogs compiled an overall record of 3–6–1, with a conference record of 1–6, and finished 12th in the SEC.

== Schedule ==
Date	Opponent	Site	Result	Attendance	Source
September 22	at Vanderbilt	Dudley Field; Nashville, TN (rivalry)	L 0–14	28,000	
September 29	Florida State*	Sanford Stadium; Athens, GA	W 3–0		
October 6	Mississippi State	Sanford Stadium; Athens, GA	L 7–19	20,000	
October 13	at North Carolina*	Kenan Memorial Stadium; Chapel Hill, NC	W 26–12	19,000	
October 19	at No. 11 Miami (FL)*	Burdine Stadium; Miami, FL	T 7–7	42,682	
October 27	Kentucky^{†}	Sanford Stadium; Athens, GA	L 7–14		
November 3	at Alabama	Legion Field; Birmingham, AL (rivalry)	W 16–13	25,000	
November 10	vs. No. 13 Florida	Gator Bowl Stadium; Jacksonville, FL (rivalry)	L 0–28	37,000	
November 17	vs. Auburn	Memorial Stadium; Columbus, GA (rivalry)	L 0–20	28,000	
December 1	No. 4 Georgia Tech	Sanford Stadium; Athens, GA (rivalry)	L 0–35	50,000	
*Non-conference game; ^{†}Homecoming; Rankings from AP Poll released prior to the game

== Roster ==
- E Ken Cooper
