= 1956 South Carolina Gamecocks football team =

American college football season

1956 South Carolina Gamecocks football
- Conference: Atlantic Coast Conference
- Record: 7–3 (5–2 ACC)
- Head coach: Warren Giese (1st season)
- Captains: Mackie Prickett; Buddy Frick
- Home stadium: Carolina Stadium

1956 Atlantic Coast Conference football standings
	Conf.					Overall
Team	W		L		T	W		L		T
No. 19 Clemson $	4	–	0	–	1	7	–	2	–	2
Duke	4	–	1	–	0	5	–	4	–	1
South Carolina	5	–	2	–	0	7	–	3	–	0
Maryland	2	–	2	–	1	2	–	7	–	1
North Carolina	2	–	3	–	1	2	–	7	–	1
NC State	2	–	4	–	0	3	–	7	–	0
Wake Forest	1	–	5	–	1	2	–	5	–	3
Virginia	1	–	4	–	0	3	–	7	–	0
Rankings from AP poll

The 1956 South Carolina Gamecocks football team represented the University of South Carolina as a member of the Atlantic Coast Conference (ACC) during the 1956 college football season. Led by first-year head coach Warren Giese, the Gamecocks compiled an overall record of 7–3 with a mark of 5–2 in conference play, placing third in the ACC. The team played home games at Carolina Stadium in Columbia, South Carolina.

== Schedule ==
Date	Time	Opponent	Rank	Site	Result	Attendance	Source
September 15		Wofford*		Carolina Stadium; Columbia, SC	W 26–13	20,000	
September 22		No. 16 Duke		Carolina Stadium; Columbia, SC	W 7–0	25,000	
September 28		at Miami (FL)*	No. 17	Burdine Stadium; Miami, FL	L 6–14	44,184	
October 6		North Carolina		Carolina Stadium; Columbia, SC (rivalry)	W 14–0	20,000	
October 13		vs. Virginia	No. 20	City Stadium; Richmond, VA (Tobacco Bowl)	W 27–13	19,000	
October 25		Clemson		Carolina Stadium; Columbia, SC (rivalry)	L 0–7	35,000	
November 3		at Furman*		Sirrine Stadium; Greenville, SC	W 13–6		
November 10		at NC State		Riddick Stadium; Raleigh, NC	L 7–14	11,000	
November 17		Maryland^{†}		Carolina Stadium; Columbia, SC	W 13–0	25,000	
November 22	1:00 p.m.	vs. Wake Forest		American Legion Memorial Stadium; Charlotte, NC	W 13–0	12,072	
*Non-conference game; ^{†}Homecoming; Rankings from AP Poll released prior to the game
