= 1956 TCU Horned Frogs football team =

American college football season

1956 TCU Horned Frogs football

Cotton Bowl Classic, W 28–27 vs. Syracuse
- Conference: Southwest Conference

Ranking
- Coaches: No. 14
- AP: No. 14
- Record: 8–3 (5–1 SWC)
- Head coach: Abe Martin (4th season)
- Offensive scheme: Meyer spread
- Home stadium: Amon G. Carter Stadium

1956 Southwest Conference football standings
	Conf.					Overall
Team	W		L		T	W		L		T
No. 5 Texas A&M $	6	–	0	–	0	9	–	0	–	1
No. 14 TCU	5	–	1	–	0	8	–	3	–	0
No. 11 Baylor	4	–	2	–	0	9	–	2	–	0
Arkansas	3	–	3	–	0	6	–	4	–	0
SMU	2	–	4	–	0	4	–	6	–	0
Rice	1	–	5	–	0	4	–	6	–	0
Texas	0	–	6	–	0	1	–	9	–	0
$ – Conference champion; Rankings from AP Poll

The 1956 TCU Horned Frogs football team represented Texas Christian University (TCU) in the 1956 college football season. The Horned Frogs finished the season 8–3 overall and 5–1 in the Southwest Conference. The team was coached by Abe Martin in his fourth year as head coach. The Frogs played their home games in Amon G. Carter Stadium, which is located on campus in Fort Worth, Texas. They were invited to the Cotton Bowl Classic where they won against Syracuse by a score of 28–27.

Following the 1955 season, TCU expanded Amon G. Carter stadium with the addition of a two-level press box and upper deck area. The upper deck area introduced a large, block-letter stylization of the TCU logo on the seats, which measured approximately 60' x 120' feet in design. The design is visible to the opposing stands, as well as to planes descending into the DFW International Airport. Upon completion of the expansion, the official seating capacity of the stadium was raised from 37,000 to 46,083.

== Schedule ==
Date	Opponent	Rank	Site	TV	Result	Attendance	Source
September 22	at Kansas*	No. 7	Memorial Stadium; Lawrence, KS		W 32–0	28,000	
October 6	Arkansas	No. 8	Amon G. Carter Stadium; Fort Worth, TX	NBC	W 41–6	28,000	
October 13	at Alabama*	No. 4	Denny Stadium; Tuscaloosa, AL		W 23–6	20,000	
October 20	at No. 14 Texas A&M	No. 4	Kyle Field; College Station, TX (rivalry)		L 6–7	42,000	
October 27	No. 19 Miami (FL)*	No. 10	Amon G. Carter Stadium; Fort Worth, TX		L 0–14	23,000–25,000	
November 3	No. 15 Baylor		Amon G. Carter Stadium; Fort Worth, TX (rivalry)		W 7–6	20,000	
November 10	at Texas Tech*	No. 17	Jones Stadium; Lubbock, TX (rivalry)		L 7–21	22,000–23,000	
November 17	Texas		Amon G. Carter Stadium; Fort Worth, TX (rivalry)		W 46–0	30,000	
November 24	at Rice	No. 18	Rice Stadium; Houston, TX		W 20–17	43,000	
December 1	at SMU	No. 14	Cotton Bowl; Dallas, TX (rivalry)		W 21–6	32,500	
January 1, 1957	vs. No. 8 Syracuse*	No. 14	Cotton Bowl; Dallas, TX (Cotton Bowl Classic)	NBC	W 28–27	61,500–68,000	
*Non-conference game; Rankings from AP Poll released prior to the game
