= 1956 Florida Gators football team =

American college football season

1956 Florida Gators football
- Conference: Southeastern Conference
- Record: 6–3–1 (5–2 SEC)
- Head coach: Bob Woodruff (7th season)
- Home stadium: Florida Field

1956 Southeastern Conference football standings
	Conf.					Overall
Team	W		L		T	W		L		T
No. 2 Tennessee $	6	–	0	–	0	10	–	1	–	0
No. 4 Georgia Tech	7	–	1	–	0	10	–	1	–	0
Florida	5	–	2	–	0	6	–	3	–	1
Ole Miss	4	–	2	–	0	7	–	3	–	0
Auburn	4	–	3	–	0	7	–	3	–	0
Kentucky	4	–	4	–	0	6	–	4	–	0
Tulane	3	–	3	–	0	6	–	4	–	0
Vanderbilt	2	–	5	–	0	5	–	5	–	0
Alabama	2	–	5	–	0	2	–	7	–	1
Mississippi State	2	–	5	–	0	4	–	6	–	0
LSU	1	–	5	–	0	3	–	7	–	0
Georgia	1	–	6	–	0	3	–	6	–	1
$ – Conference champion; Rankings from AP Poll

The 1956 Florida Gators football team represented the University of Florida during the 1956 college football season. The season was the seventh for Bob Woodruff as the head coach of the Florida Gators football team. The Gators were led by All-American tackle John Barrow, quarterback Jimmy Dunn, two-way halfbacks Joe Brodsky, Bernie Parrish, Jim Rountree and Jackie Simpson, and defensive back John Symank. The highlights of the season included conference road wins over the Mississippi State Maroons (26–0) in Starkville, Mississippi, the Vanderbilt Commodores 21–7 in Nashville, Tennessee, and the LSU Tigers 21–6 in Baton Rouge, Louisiana, a shutout homecoming victory over the Auburn Tigers (20–0), and a second consecutive win over the Georgia Bulldogs (28–0). Woodruff's 1956 Florida Gators started a promising 6–1–1, but lost their final two games to finish 6–3–1 overall and 5–2 in the Southeastern Conference, placing third in the SEC among twelve teams.

== Schedule ==
Date	Opponent	Rank	Site	Result	Attendance	Source
September 22	at Mississippi State		Scott Field; Starkville, MS	W 26–0		
September 29	Clemson*	No. 19	Florida Field; Gainesville, FL	T 20–20	28,000	
October 6	Kentucky		Florida Field; Gainesville, FL (rivalry)	L 8–17	26,000	
October 13	Rice*		Florida Field; Gainesville, FL	W 7–0	26,000	
October 20	at Vanderbilt		Dudley Field; Nashville, TN	W 21–7	24,000	
October 27	at LSU		Tiger Stadium; Baton Rouge, LA (rivalry)	W 21–6	35,000	
November 3	Auburn^{†}		Florida Field; Gainesville, FL (rivalry)	W 20–0	41,000	
November 10	vs. Georgia	No. 13	Gator Bowl Stadium; Jacksonville, FL (rivalry)	W 28–0	37,000	
November 24	vs. No. 5 Georgia Tech	No. 13	Gator Bowl Stadium; Jacksonville, FL	L 0–28	37,000	
December 1	No. 6 Miami (FL)*	No. 18	Florida Field; Gainesville, FL (rivalry)	L 7–20	40,000	
*Non-conference game; ^{†}Homecoming; Rankings from AP Poll released prior to the game

== Roster ==
- QB Jimmy Dunn, So.
