= 1956 Alabama Crimson Tide football team =

American college football season

1956 Alabama Crimson Tide football
- Conference: Southeastern Conference
- Record: 2–7–1 (2–5 SEC)
- Head coach: Jennings B. Whitworth (2nd season)
- Captains: Jim Cunningham; Wes Thompson
- Home stadium: Denny Stadium; Legion Field; Ladd Stadium

1956 Southeastern Conference football standings
	Conf.					Overall
Team	W		L		T	W		L		T
No. 2 Tennessee $	6	–	0	–	0	10	–	1	–	0
No. 4 Georgia Tech	7	–	1	–	0	10	–	1	–	0
Florida	5	–	2	–	0	6	–	3	–	1
Ole Miss	4	–	2	–	0	7	–	3	–	0
Auburn	4	–	3	–	0	7	–	3	–	0
Kentucky	4	–	4	–	0	6	–	4	–	0
Tulane	3	–	3	–	0	6	–	4	–	0
Vanderbilt	2	–	5	–	0	5	–	5	–	0
Alabama	2	–	5	–	0	2	–	7	–	1
Mississippi State	2	–	5	–	0	4	–	6	–	0
LSU	1	–	5	–	0	3	–	7	–	0
Georgia	1	–	6	–	0	3	–	6	–	1
$ – Conference champion; Rankings from AP Poll

The 1956 Alabama Crimson Tide football team (variously "Alabama", "UA" or "Bama") represented the University of Alabama in the 1956 college football season. It was the Crimson Tide's 62nd overall and 23rd season as a member of the Southeastern Conference (SEC). The team was led by head coach Jennings B. Whitworth, in his second year, and played their home games at Denny Stadium in Tuscaloosa, Legion Field in Birmingham and at Ladd Stadium in Mobile, Alabama. They finished with a record of two wins, seven losses and one tie (2–7–1 overall, 2–5 in the SEC).

In 1956 the Crimson Tide improved somewhat from the year before—but not much. Alabama opened the season with four straight losses by a combined score of 99–26 to Rice, Vanderbilt, TCU and Tennessee. At this point, the all-time school record losing streak ran to 17 consecutive games, and the winless streak reached 20 games back to the 1954 season. Then against Mississippi State, Alabama won a game for the first time since October 16, 1954. The Tide scored with 2½ minutes to go and kicked the extra point to beat Maroons 13–12. After a loss to Georgia Alabama managed a 13–7 victory over Tulane. They then closed the season with a 13–13 tie with Mississippi Southern between losses to Georgia Tech and Auburn.

== Schedule ==
Date	Opponent	Site	Result	Attendance	Source
September 22	at Rice*	Rice Stadium; Houston, TX	L 13–20	43,000	
October 6	No. 18 Vanderbilt	Ladd Stadium; Mobile, AL	L 7–32	23,071	
October 13	No. 4 TCU*	Denny Stadium; Tuscaloosa, AL	L 6–23	20,000	
October 20	at No. 7 Tennessee	Shields—Watkins Field; Knoxville, TN (Third Saturday in October)	L 0–24	27,500	
October 27	Mississippi State^{†}	Denny Stadium; Tuscaloosa, AL (rivalry)	W 13–12	26,000	
November 3	Georgia	Legion Field; Birmingham, AL (rivalry)	L 13–16	25,000	
November 10	at Tulane	Tulane Stadium; New Orleans, LA	W 13–7	30,000	
November 17	at No. 4 Georgia Tech	Grant Field; Atlanta, GA (rivalry)	L 0–27	38,000	
November 24	Mississippi Southern*	Denny Stadium; Tuscaloosa, AL	T 13–13	16,000	
December 1	vs. Auburn	Legion Field; Birmingham, AL (Iron Bowl)	L 7–34	44,000	
*Non-conference game; ^{†}Homecoming; Rankings from AP Poll released prior to the game

== Game summaries ==
=== Rice ===
Team	1	2	3	4	Total
Alabama	7	0	6	0	13
• Rice	7	7	0	6	20

- Date: September 22
- Location: Rice Stadium
  Houston, TX
- Game attendance: 43,000

The Crimson Tide opened the 1956 season with their 14th consecutive loss, while their opponent, the Rice Owls, ended their own seven-game losing streak with their 20–13 victory at Houston. The Owls scored the first touchdown of the game on their opening drive when Frank Ryan threw a 12-yard pass to Buddy Dial. Alabama responded in the final minute of the quarter with a one-yard Clay Walls touchdown run to tie the game at 7–7. Rice then took a 14–7 halftime lead after King Hill threw a 30-yard touchdown pass to Bobby Williams in the second quarter. After a 17-yard Donald Comstock touchdown run brought the Crimson Tide within a point of the Owls lead, Rice closed the game with an 18-yard Ryan touchdown pass to Dial in the fourth to win 20–13.

=== Vanderbilt ===
Team	1	2	3	4	Total
• #18 Vanderbilt	0	13	6	13	32
Alabama	0	0	7	0	7

- Date: October 6
- Location: Ladd Stadium
  Mobile, AL
- Game attendance: 23,071

In their annual home game at Ladd Stadium, the Crimson Tide were defeated by the Vanderbilt Commodores 32–7 to open conference play. After a scoreless first quarter, the Commodores took a 13–0 halftime lead with second-quarter touchdowns scored on a short pass from Donald Orr to Gerald Hudson and later on a three-yard Danny McCall run. Hudson extended the Vandy lead to 19–0 with his three-yard touchdown run before the Crimson Tide scored their only points of the game on a one-yard Donald Comstock touchdown run that made the score 19–7. Vanderbilt then closed the game with a pair of touchdowns on runs of 25-yards by Phil King and three-yards by William Smith to win 32–7.

=== TCU ===
Team	1	2	3	4	Total
• #4 TCU	7	9	7	0	23
Alabama	0	0	0	6	6

- Date: October 13
- Location: Denny Stadium
  Tuscaloosa, AL
- Game attendance: 20,000

For the second consecutive season, Alabama played host to the Texas Christian University (TCU) Horned Frogs of the Southwest Conference, and for the second time in as many years lost 23–6. TCU took a 7–0 first quarter lead on a 46-yard Ken Wineburg touchdown run that capped an 81-yard drive. In the second quarter, the Frogs scored on an 11-yard Buddy Dike touchdown run and on a 21-yard Vernon Hallbeck field goal and took a 16–0 halftime lead. After a 41-yard Wineburg run in the third gave TCU a 23–0 lead, Alabama scored their lone points in the fourth on a 10-yard James Loftin touchdown run that made the final score 23–6.

=== Tennessee ===
Third Saturday in October

Team	1	2	3	4	Total
Alabama	0	0	0	0	0
• #7 Tennessee	6	6	6	6	24

- Date: October 20
- Location: Shields-Watkins Field
  Knoxville, TN
- Game attendance: 27,500

In their annual rivalry game against Tennessee, Alabama was shut out for the second consecutive year by the Volunteers in a 24–0 loss in Knoxville. In the game, Tennessee scored a touchdown in all four quarters. The Vols took a 12–0 halftime lead after Tommy Bronson scored on a three-yard run in the first and Al Carter scored on a 44-yard run in the second. After Johnny Majors scored on a short run to open the third quarter, Carter scored the final touchdown of the game in the fourth quarter on a one-yard run that made the final score 24–0.

=== Mississippi State ===
Team	1	2	3	4	Total
Mississippi State	12	0	0	0	12
• Alabama	0	6	0	7	13

- Date: October 27
- Location: Denny Stadium
  Tuscaloosa, AL
- Game attendance: 26,000

On homecoming in Tuscaloosa, the Crimson Tide upset the Mississippi State Maroons 13–12 at Denny Stadium that ended both a 17-game losing streak that stretched back to the 1954 season and gave Whitworth his first victory as Crimson Tide head coach. The Maroons took a 12–0 first quarter lead on touchdown runs of two-yards by Frank Sabbatini and 22-yards by Billy Stacy. The Crimson Tide responded in the second quarter on a 46-yard Clay Walls touchdown pass to Jimmy Bowdoin that made the halftime score 12–6. After a scoreless third quarter, Walls tied the game 12–12 with his one-yard touchdown run in the fourth. The Pete Reeves extra point that followed gave Alabama the 13–12 victory and ended their 17-game losing streak.

=== Georgia ===
Team	1	2	3	4	Total
• Georgia	0	0	7	9	16
Alabama	7	0	0	6	13

- Date: November 3
- Location: Legion Field
  Birmingham, AL
- Game attendance: 25,000

One week after they won their first game in nearly two years, the Crimson Tide lost to the Georgia Bulldogs 16–13 at Legion Field. Alabama took a 7–0 lead into halftime after Charles Nelson scored on a one-yard touchdown run in the first quarter. After Georgia tied the game 7–7 in the third quarter on an 80-yard J. B. Davis punt return, they took a 10–7 lead early in the fourth quarter after Clenton Cooper kicked a 29-yard field goal. They extended their lead further to 16–7 after a short William Hearn touchdown run, before Alabama scored their final points on a 24-yard Marshall Brown touchdown run that made the final score 16–13.

=== Tulane ===
Team	1	2	3	4	Total
• Alabama	0	13	0	0	13
Tulane	0	0	0	7	7

- Date: November 10
- Location: Tulane Stadium
  New Orleans, LA
- Game attendance: 30,000

On the road in New Orleans, the Crimson Tide won their second game of the season with this 13–7 victory over the Tulane Green Wave. After a scoreless first quarter, Alabama scored both of their touchdowns in the second quarter. Both were scored on one-yard runs, first from Donald Comstock and second from George Salem. After a scoreless third, Tulane made the final score 13–7 on a 29-yard Fred Wilcox touchdown pass to T. Eugene Newton.

=== Georgia Tech ===
Team	1	2	3	4	Total
Alabama	0	0	0	0	0
• No. 4 Georgia Tech	7	0	6	14	27

- Date: November 17
- Location: Grant Field
  Atlanta, GA

Against Georgia Tech, Alabama was shut out, 27–0, by the Yellow Jackets at Grant Field.

=== Mississippi Southern ===
Team	1	2	3	4	Total
Miss Southern	0	7	6	0	13
Alabama	0	7	6	0	13

- Date: November 24
- Location: Denny Stadium
  Tuscaloosa, AL
- Game attendance: 16,000

In their final non-conference game of the season, Alabama tied the Mississippi Southern Southerners 13–13 at Denny Stadium. After a scoreless first quarter, Bo Dickinson scored on a 38-yard touchdown run for Southern and then Bobby Smith threw a 52-yard touchdown pass to Donald Comstock for Alabama to tie the game 7–7 at halftime. In the third quarter, Smith threw a 15-yard touchdown pass to Comstock for the Crimson Tide and the Dickinson scored on a 37-yard touchdown run to again tie the game 13–13, which stood as the final score after a scoreless fourth quarter.

=== Auburn ===
Iron Bowl

Team	1	2	3	4	Total
• Auburn	0	27	7	0	34
Alabama	0	0	7	0	7

- Date: December 1
- Location: Legion Field
  Birmingham, AL
- Game attendance: 44,000

Against the rival Auburn Tigers, Alabama lost 34–7 at Legion Field in the season finale.

== Personnel ==
=== Varsity letter winners ===
Player	Hometown	Position
Willie Beck	Northport, Alabama	End
Ralph Blalock	Cullman, Alabama	End
Baxter Booth	Athens, Alabama	End
Jimmy Bowdoin	Elba, Alabama	Halfback
William Brooks	Tuscaloosa, Alabama	Center
Marshall Brown	Ladysmith, Wisconsin	Fullback
Phil Clark	Columbus, Georgia	Guard
Donald Comstock	Lincoln, Nebraska	Halfback
Benny Dempsey	Brantley, Alabama	Center
Roy Forbus	Alexander City, Alabama	End
Glen Graham	Florence, Alabama	Center
Charles Gray	Pell City, Alabama	End
Max Kelley	Cullman, Alabama	Fullback
Donald Kinderknecht	Hays, Kansas	Fullback
James Loftin	Dothan, Alabama	Halfback
Sidney Neighbors	Northport, Alabama	Tackle
Charles Nelson	Opp, Alabama	Quarterback
Donald Owen	Memphis, Tennessee	End
Edward Pharo	Birmingham, Alabama	Fullback
Douglas Potts	Evergreen, Alabama	Guard
Billy Raines	Moulton, Alabama	Guard
Kenneth Roberts	Anniston, Alabama	Center
George Salem	Birmingham, Alabama	Halfback
Dave Sington	Birmingham, Alabama	Tackle
Bobby Smith	Brewton, Alabama	Quarterback
John Snoderly	Montgomery, Alabama	Center
Wesley Thompson	Decatur, Alabama	Tackle
Roy Vickery	Charlotte, North Carolina	Tackle
Clay Walls	Bessemer, Alabama	Halfback

=== Coaching staff ===
Name	Position	Seasons at Alabama	Alma mater
Jennings B. Whitworth	Head coach	2	Alabama (1932)
Lew Bostick	Assistant coach	13	Alabama (1939)
Hank Crisp	Assistant coach	29	VPI (1920)
Dorsey Gibson	Assistant coach	1	Oklahoma A&M (1953)
Howard "Moose" Johnson	Assistant coach	2	Georgia (1948)
Joe Kilgrow	Assistant coach	13	Alabama (1937)
Malcolm Laney	Assistant coach	13	Alabama (1932)
Barney Poole	Assistant coach	1	Ole Miss (1948)
Joe Thomas	Assistant coach	2	Oklahoma A&M (1947)
