= 1956 Texas Longhorns football team =

American college football season

1956 Texas Longhorns football
- Conference: Southwest Conference
- Record: 1–9 (0–6 SWC)
- Head coach: Ed Price (6th season)
- Home stadium: Memorial Stadium

1956 Southwest Conference football standings
	Conf.					Overall
Team	W		L		T	W		L		T
No. 5 Texas A&M $	6	–	0	–	0	9	–	0	–	1
No. 14 TCU	5	–	1	–	0	8	–	3	–	0
No. 11 Baylor	4	–	2	–	0	9	–	2	–	0
Arkansas	3	–	3	–	0	6	–	4	–	0
SMU	2	–	4	–	0	4	–	6	–	0
Rice	1	–	5	–	0	4	–	6	–	0
Texas	0	–	6	–	0	1	–	9	–	0
$ – Conference champion; Rankings from AP Poll

The 1956 Texas Longhorns football team was an American football team that represented the University of Texas (now known as the University of Texas at Austin) as a member of the Southwest Conference (SWC) during the 1956 college football season. In their sixth year under head coach Ed Price, the Longhorns compiled an overall record of 1–9, with a mark of 0–6 in conference play, and finished seventh in the SWC.

The team had more losses than any other Longhorn team in program history and tied for the fewest wins. It was the first team to ever lose to the Texas A&M Aggies at Memorial Stadium. The win was Bear Bryant's only victory over a Texas Longhorns team.

The team had two players make the All-Southwest Conference 2nd team - Walter Fondren and Bob Bryant.

It led to head coach Ed Price being fired.

== Schedule ==
Date	Opponent	Site	Result	Attendance	Source
September 22	No. 15 USC*	Memorial Stadium; Austin, TX	L 20–44	47,000	
September 29	at Tulane*	Tulane Stadium; New Orleans, LA	W 7–6	35,000	
October 6	West Virginia*	Memorial Stadium; Austin, TX	L 6–7	30,000	
October 13	vs. No. 1 Oklahoma*	Cotton Bowl; Dallas, TX (rivalry)	L 0–45	75,504	
October 20	Arkansas	Memorial Stadium; Austin, TX (rivalry)	L 14–32	40,000	
October 27	at Rice	Rice Stadium; Houston, TX (rivalry)	L 7–28	67,000	
November 3	SMU	Memorial Stadium; Austin, TX	L 19–20	36,000	
November 10	at Baylor	Baylor Stadium; Waco, TX (rivalry)	L 7–10	21,000	
November 17	at TCU	Amon G. Carter Stadium; Fort Worth, TX (rivalry)	L 0–46	30,000	
November 29	No. 5 Texas A&M	Memorial Stadium; Austin, TX (rivalry)	L 21–34	61,000	
*Non-conference game; Rankings from AP Poll released prior to the game
