= 1956 LSU Tigers football team =

American college football season

1956 LSU Tigers football
- Conference: Southeastern Conference
- Record: 3–7 (1–5 SEC)
- Head coach: Paul Dietzel (2nd season)
- Home stadium: Tiger Stadium

1956 Southeastern Conference football standings
| | Conf. | | | | | Overall |
| Team | W | | L | | T | W | | L | | T |
|---|---|---|---|---|---|---|---|---|---|---|
| No. 2 Tennessee $ | 6 | – | 0 | – | 0 | 10 | – | 1 | – | 0 |
| No. 4 Georgia Tech | 7 | – | 1 | – | 0 | 10 | – | 1 | – | 0 |
| Florida | 5 | – | 2 | – | 0 | 6 | – | 3 | – | 1 |
| Ole Miss | 4 | – | 2 | – | 0 | 7 | – | 3 | – | 0 |
| Auburn | 4 | – | 3 | – | 0 | 7 | – | 3 | – | 0 |
| Kentucky | 4 | – | 4 | – | 0 | 6 | – | 4 | – | 0 |
| Tulane | 3 | – | 3 | – | 0 | 6 | – | 4 | – | 0 |
| Vanderbilt | 2 | – | 5 | – | 0 | 5 | – | 5 | – | 0 |
| Alabama | 2 | – | 5 | – | 0 | 2 | – | 7 | – | 1 |
| Mississippi State | 2 | – | 5 | – | 0 | 4 | – | 6 | – | 0 |
| LSU | 1 | – | 5 | – | 0 | 3 | – | 7 | – | 0 |
| Georgia | 1 | – | 6 | – | 0 | 3 | – | 6 | – | 1 |
$ – Conference champion; Rankings from AP Poll

The 1956 LSU Tigers football team was an American football team that represented Louisiana State University (LSU) as a member of the Southeastern Conference (SEC) during the 1956 college football season. In their second year under head coach Paul Dietzel, the Tigers compiled an overall record of 3–7, with a conference record of 1–5, and finished ninth in the SEC.

== Schedule ==
| Date | Opponent | Site | Result | Attendance | Source |
|---|---|---|---|---|---|
| September 29 | No. 11 Texas A&M* | Tiger Stadium; Baton Rouge, LA (rivalry) | L 6–9 | 61,000 | |
| October 6 | at Rice* | Rice Stadium; Houston, TX | L 14–23 | 55,000 | |
| October 13 | at No. 3 Georgia Tech | Grant Field; Atlanta, GA | L 7–39 | 39,500 | |
| October 20 | at Kentucky | McLean Stadium; Lexington, KY | L 0–14 | | |
| October 27 | Florida^{†} | Tiger Stadium; Baton Rouge, LA (rivalry) | L 6–21 | 35,000 | |
| November 3 | Ole Miss | Tiger Stadium; Baton Rouge, LA (rivalry) | L 17–46 | 35,000 | |
| November 10 | Oklahoma A&M* | Tiger Stadium; Baton Rouge, LA | W 13–0 | 22,000 | |
| November 17 | Mississippi State | Tiger Stadium; Baton Rouge, LA (rivalry) | L 13–32 | 25,000 | |
| November 24 | Arkansas* | State Fair Stadium; Shreveport, LA (rivalry) | W 21–7 | 28,000 | |
| December 1 | Tulane | Tiger Stadium; Baton Rouge, LA (Battle for the Rag) | W 7–6 | 60,000 | |
*Non-conference game; ^{†}Homecoming; Rankings from AP Poll released prior to the game
