= 1956 Duke Blue Devils football team =

American college football season

1956 Duke Blue Devils football
- Conference: Atlantic Coast Conference

Ranking
- Coaches: No. 20
- Record: 5–4–1 (4–1 ACC)
- Head coach: William D. Murray (6th season)
- MVP: Sidney Deloatch
- Captain: Buddy Bass
- Home stadium: Duke Stadium

1956 Atlantic Coast Conference football standings
	Conf.					Overall
Team	W		L		T	W		L		T
No. 19 Clemson $	4	–	0	–	1	7	–	2	–	2
Duke	4	–	1	–	0	5	–	4	–	1
South Carolina	5	–	2	–	0	7	–	3	–	0
Maryland	2	–	2	–	1	2	–	7	–	1
North Carolina	2	–	3	–	1	2	–	7	–	1
NC State	2	–	4	–	0	3	–	7	–	0
Wake Forest	1	–	5	–	1	2	–	5	–	3
Virginia	1	–	4	–	0	3	–	7	–	0
Rankings from AP poll

The 1956 Duke Blue Devils football team was an American football team that represented Duke University as a member of the Atlantic Coast Conference (ACC) during the 1956 college football season. In their sixth year under head coach William D. Murray, the Blue Devils compiled an overall record of 5–4–1, with a conference record of 4–1, and finished second in the ACC.

== Schedule ==
Date	Opponent	Rank	Site	Result	Attendance	Source
September 22	at South Carolina	No. 16	Carolina Stadium; Columbia, SC	L 0–7	25,000	
September 29	at Virginia		Scott Stadium; Charlottesville, VA	W 40–7	17,000	
October 6	No. 9 Tennessee*		Duke Stadium; Durham, NC	L 20–33	22,000	
October 13	No. 19 SMU*^{†}		Duke Stadium; Durham, NC	W 14–6	25,000	
October 20	vs. No. 16 Pittsburgh*		Foreman Field; Norfolk, VA (Oyster Bowl)	L 14–27	26,000–27,000	
October 27	NC State		Duke Stadium; Durham, NC (rivalry)	W 42–0	12,000	
November 3	No. 2 Georgia Tech*		Duke Stadium; Durham, NC	L 0–7	38,000	
November 10	No. 12 Navy*		Duke Stadium; Durham, NC	T 7–7	25,000	
November 17	at Wake Forest		Bowman Gray Stadium; Wake Forest, NC (rivalry)	W 26–0	5,000–6,000	
November 24	at North Carolina		Kenan Memorial Stadium; Chapel Hill, NC (Victory Bell)	W 21–6	36,000	
*Non-conference game; ^{†}Homecoming; Rankings from AP Poll released prior to the game
