= 1956 Florida State Seminoles football team =

American college football season

1956 Florida State Seminoles football
- Conference: Independent
- Record: 5–4–1
- Head coach: Tom Nugent (4th season)
- Captains: Joe Holt; Buck Metts
- Home stadium: Doak Campbell Stadium

1956 Southern major college football independents records
	Conf.			Overall
Team	W	L	T	W		L		T
No. 6 Miami (FL)		–		8	–	1	–	1
No. 16 Navy		–		6	–	1	–	2
Florida State		–		5	–	4	–	1
Texas Tech		–		2	–	7	–	1
Rankings from AP poll

The 1956 Florida State Seminoles football team represented Florida State University as an independent during the 1956 college football season. Led by fourth-year head coach Tom Nugent, the Seminoles compiled a record of 5–4–1.

== Schedule ==
Date	Time	Opponent	Site	Result	Attendance	Source
September 22		Ohio	Doak Campbell Stadium; Tallahassee, FL	W 47–7	18,302	
September 29		at Georgia	Sanford Stadium; Athens, GA	L 0–3	25,000	
October 6	8:00 p.m.	VPI	Doak Campbell Stadium; Tallahassee, FL	L 7–20	16,783	
October 13		at NC State	Riddick Stadium; Raleigh, NC	W 14–0	10,000	
October 20		Wake Forest	Doak Campbell Stadium; Tallahassee, FL	T 14–14	14,000	
October 27		at Villanova	Philadelphia Municipal Stadium; Philadelphia, PA	W 20–13	42,691	
November 2		at No. 9 Miami (FL)	Burdine Stadium; Miami, FL (rivalry)	L 7–20	36,925	
November 10		Furman	Doak Campbell Stadium; Tallahassee, FL	W 42–7	9,000	
November 17		Mississippi Southern	Doak Campbell Stadium; Tallahassee, FL	W 20–19	12,200	
November 24		at Auburn	Cliff Hare Stadium; Auburn, AL	L 7–13	10,000	
Rankings from AP Poll released prior to the game
