= 1956 NC State Wolfpack football team =

American college football season

1956 NC State Wolfpack football
- Conference: Atlantic Coast Conference
- Record: 3–7 (2–4 ACC)
- Head coach: Earle Edwards (3rd season)
- Home stadium: Riddick Stadium

1956 Atlantic Coast Conference football standings
	Conf.					Overall
Team	W		L		T	W		L		T
No. 19 Clemson $	4	–	0	–	1	7	–	2	–	2
Duke	4	–	1	–	0	5	–	4	–	1
South Carolina	5	–	2	–	0	7	–	3	–	0
Maryland	2	–	2	–	1	2	–	7	–	1
North Carolina	2	–	3	–	1	2	–	7	–	1
NC State	2	–	4	–	0	3	–	7	–	0
Wake Forest	1	–	5	–	1	2	–	5	–	3
Virginia	1	–	4	–	0	3	–	7	–	0
Rankings from AP poll

The 1956 NC State Wolfpack football team represented North Carolina State University during the 1956 college football season. The Wolfpack were led by third-year head coach Earle Edwards and played their home games at Riddick Stadium in Raleigh, North Carolina. They competed as members of the Atlantic Coast Conference, finishing in sixth. NC State's victory over rival North Carolina was the school's first ACC victory, coming in their fourth year in the conference.

== Schedule ==
Date	Time	Opponent	Rank	Site	Result	Attendance	Source
September 22		at North Carolina		Kenan Memorial Stadium; Chapel Hill, NC (rivalry)	W 26–6	37,000	
September 29	2:00 p.m.	vs. VPI*	No. 20	Foreman Field; Norfolk, VA	L 6–35	10,000	
October 6		Clemson		Riddick Stadium; Raleigh, NC (rivalry)	L 7–13	15,000	
October 13		Florida State*		Riddick Stadium; Raleigh, NC	L 0–14	10,000	
October 20		at Dayton*		Dayton Stadium; Dayton, OH	W 20–0	10,000	
October 27		at Duke		Duke Stadium; Durham, NC (rivalry)	L 0–42	13,000	
November 3		at Wake Forest		Bowman Gray Stadium; Winston-Salem, NC (rivalry)	L 0–13	14,000	
November 10		South Carolina		Riddick Stadium; Raleigh, NC	W 14–7	11,000	
November 17		at Penn State*		New Beaver Field; University Park, PA	L 7–14	22,864	
November 22		Maryland		Riddick Stadium; Raleigh, NC	L 14–25	4,500	
*Non-conference game; Rankings from AP Poll released prior to the game
