= 1956 Auburn Tigers football team =

American college football season

1956 Auburn Tigers football
- Conference: Southeastern Conference
- Record: 7–3 (4–3 SEC)
- Head coach: Ralph Jordan (6th season)
- Home stadium: Cliff Hare Stadium; Legion Field

1956 Southeastern Conference football standings
	Conf.					Overall
Team	W		L		T	W		L		T
No. 2 Tennessee $	6	–	0	–	0	10	–	1	–	0
No. 4 Georgia Tech	7	–	1	–	0	10	–	1	–	0
Florida	5	–	2	–	0	6	–	3	–	1
Ole Miss	4	–	2	–	0	7	–	3	–	0
Auburn	4	–	3	–	0	7	–	3	–	0
Kentucky	4	–	4	–	0	6	–	4	–	0
Tulane	3	–	3	–	0	6	–	4	–	0
Vanderbilt	2	–	5	–	0	5	–	5	–	0
Alabama	2	–	5	–	0	2	–	7	–	1
Mississippi State	2	–	5	–	0	4	–	6	–	0
LSU	1	–	5	–	0	3	–	7	–	0
Georgia	1	–	6	–	0	3	–	6	–	1
$ – Conference champion; Rankings from AP Poll

The 1956 Auburn Tigers football team represented Auburn University in the 1956 college football season. It was the Tigers' 65th overall and 24th season as a member of the Southeastern Conference (SEC). The team was led by head coach Ralph "Shug" Jordan, in his sixth year, and played their home games at Cliff Hare Stadium in Auburn and Legion Field in Birmingham, Alabama. They finished with a record of seven wins and three losses (7–3 overall, 4–3 in the SEC).

== Schedule ==
Date	Opponent	Site	Result	Attendance	Source
September 29	Tennessee	Legion Field; Birmingham, AL (rivalry)	L 7–35	44,000	
October 6	Furman*	Cliff Hare Stadium; Auburn, AL	W 41–0		
October 13	at Kentucky	McLean Stadium; Lexington, KY	W 13–0	32,000	
October 20	at No. 3 Georgia Tech	Grant Field; Atlanta, GA	L 7–28	40,000	
October 27	Houston*	Cliff Hare Stadium; Auburn, AL	W 12–0	20,000	
November 3	at Florida	Florida Field; Gainesville, FL (rivalry)	L 0–20	41,000	
November 10	Mississippi State^{†}	Cliff Hare Stadium; Auburn, AL	W 27–20	32,000	
November 17	vs. Georgia	Memorial Stadium; Columbus, GA (rivalry)	W 20–0	28,000	
November 24	Florida State*	Cliff Hare Stadium; Auburn, AL	W 13–7	10,000	
December 1	vs. Alabama	Legion Field; Birmingham, AL (Iron Bowl)	W 34–7	44,000	
*Non-conference game; ^{†}Homecoming; Rankings from AP Poll released prior to the game

== Roster ==
- QB Jimmy Cook
