= 1956 Virginia Cavaliers football team =

American college football season

1956 Virginia Cavaliers football
- Conference: Atlantic Coast Conference
- Record: 3–7 (1–4 ACC)
- Head coach: Ben Martin (1st season)
- Captain: Henry Jordan
- Home stadium: Scott Stadium

1956 Atlantic Coast Conference football standings
	Conf.					Overall
Team	W		L		T	W		L		T
No. 19 Clemson $	4	–	0	–	1	7	–	2	–	2
Duke	4	–	1	–	0	5	–	4	–	1
South Carolina	5	–	2	–	0	7	–	3	–	0
Maryland	2	–	2	–	1	2	–	7	–	1
North Carolina	2	–	3	–	1	2	–	7	–	1
NC State	2	–	4	–	0	3	–	7	–	0
Wake Forest	1	–	5	–	1	2	–	5	–	3
Virginia	1	–	4	–	0	3	–	7	–	0
Rankings from AP poll

The 1956 Virginia Cavaliers football team represented the University of Virginia during the 1956 college football season. The Cavaliers were led by first-year head coach Ben Martin and played their home games at Scott Stadium in Charlottesville, Virginia. They competed as members of the Atlantic Coast Conference, finishing in last. Their win against Wake Forest was Virginia's first ACC victory as members of the conference, coming in their third year of membership.

== Schedule ==
Date	Opponent	Site	Result	Attendance	Source
September 22	VMI*	Scott Stadium; Charlottesville, VA	W 18–0	22,000	
September 29	Duke	Scott Stadium; Charlottesville, VA	L 7–40	17,000	
October 6	Wake Forest^{†}	Scott Stadium; Charlottesville, VA	W 7–6	12,000	
October 13	vs. No. 20 South Carolina	City Stadium; Richmond, VA (Tobacco Bowl)	L 13–27	19,000	
October 20	at Lehigh*	Taylor Stadium; Bethlehem, PA	W 24–12	9,000	
October 27	vs. No. 16 VPI*	Victory Stadium; Roanoke, VA (rivalry)	L 7–14	16,000	
November 3	Vanderbilt*	Scott Stadium; Charlottesville, VA	L 2–6	8,000	
November 10	North Carolina	Scott Stadium; Charlottesville, VA (South's Oldest Rivalry)	L 7–21	16,000	
November 17	vs. No. 15 Navy*	Municipal Stadium; Baltimore, MD	L 7–34	12,000	
November 24	at Clemson	Memorial Stadium; Clemson, SC	L 0–7	16,000	
*Non-conference game; ^{†}Homecoming; Rankings from AP Poll released prior to the game
