= 1956 Tulane Green Wave football team =

American college football season

1956 Tulane Green Wave football
- Conference: Southeastern Conference
- Record: 6–4 (3–3 SEC)
- Head coach: Andy Pilney (3rd season)
- Home stadium: Tulane Stadium

1956 Southeastern Conference football standings
	Conf.					Overall
Team	W		L		T	W		L		T
No. 2 Tennessee $	6	–	0	–	0	10	–	1	–	0
No. 4 Georgia Tech	7	–	1	–	0	10	–	1	–	0
Florida	5	–	2	–	0	6	–	3	–	1
Ole Miss	4	–	2	–	0	7	–	3	–	0
Auburn	4	–	3	–	0	7	–	3	–	0
Kentucky	4	–	4	–	0	6	–	4	–	0
Tulane	3	–	3	–	0	6	–	4	–	0
Vanderbilt	2	–	5	–	0	5	–	5	–	0
Alabama	2	–	5	–	0	2	–	7	–	1
Mississippi State	2	–	5	–	0	4	–	6	–	0
LSU	1	–	5	–	0	3	–	7	–	0
Georgia	1	–	6	–	0	3	–	6	–	1
$ – Conference champion; Rankings from AP Poll

The 1956 Tulane Green Wave football team was an American football team that represented Tulane University during the 1956 college football season as a member of the Southeastern Conference. In its third year under head coach Andy Pilney, Tulane compiled a 6–4 record (3–3 in conference games), finished in seventh place in the SEC, and outscored opponents by a total of 124 to 123.

The team gained an average of 222.8 rushing yards and 46.7 passing yards per game. On defense, it gave up an average of 190.3 rushing yards and 72.9 passing yards per game. Tulane's individual leaders included Gene Newton with 280 passing yards, Ronny Quillian with 625 rushing yards, and Will Billon with 140 receiving yards.

The Green Wave played its home games at Tulane Stadium in New Orleans.

== Schedule ==
Date	Opponent	Rank	Site	Result	Attendance	Source
September 22	VPI*		Tulane Stadium; New Orleans, LA	W 21–14	30,000	
September 29	Texas*		Tulane Stadium; New Orleans, LA	L 6–7	35,000	
October 6	at Northwestern*		Dyche Stadium; Evanston, IL	W 20–13	32,000	
October 13	No. 14 Navy*		Tulane Stadium; New Orleans, LA	W 21–6	45,000	
October 20	at No. 6 Ole Miss	No. 19	Mississippi Veterans Memorial Stadium; Jackson, MS (rivalry)	W 10–3	28,000	
October 27	at No. 3 Georgia Tech	No. 15	Grant Field; Atlanta, GA	L 0–40	40,000	
November 3	Mississippi State		Tulane Stadium; New Orleans, LA	W 20–14		
November 10	Alabama		Tulane Stadium; New Orleans, LA	L 7–13	30,000	
November 17	at Vanderbilt		Dudley Field; Nashville, TN	W 13–6	22,000	
December 1	LSU		Tulane Stadium; New Orleans, LA (Battle for the Rag)	L 6–7	60,000	
*Non-conference game; Rankings from AP Poll released prior to the game
