= 1956 Kentucky Wildcats football team =

American college football season

1956 Kentucky Wildcats football
- Conference: Southeastern Conference
- Record: 6–4 (4–4 SEC)
- Head coach: Blanton Collier (3rd season)
- Home stadium: McLean Stadium

1956 Southeastern Conference football standings
	Conf.					Overall
Team	W		L		T	W		L		T
No. 2 Tennessee $	6	–	0	–	0	10	–	1	–	0
No. 4 Georgia Tech	7	–	1	–	0	10	–	1	–	0
Florida	5	–	2	–	0	6	–	3	–	1
Ole Miss	4	–	2	–	0	7	–	3	–	0
Auburn	4	–	3	–	0	7	–	3	–	0
Kentucky	4	–	4	–	0	6	–	4	–	0
Tulane	3	–	3	–	0	6	–	4	–	0
Vanderbilt	2	–	5	–	0	5	–	5	–	0
Alabama	2	–	5	–	0	2	–	7	–	1
Mississippi State	2	–	5	–	0	4	–	6	–	0
LSU	1	–	5	–	0	3	–	7	–	0
Georgia	1	–	6	–	0	3	–	6	–	1
$ – Conference champion; Rankings from AP Poll

The 1956 Kentucky Wildcats football team were an American football team that represented the University of Kentucky as a member of the Southeastern Conference during the 1956 college football season. In their third season under head coach Blanton Collier, the team compiled a 6–4 record (4–4 in the SEC).

== Schedule ==
Date	Opponent	Site	Result	Attendance	Source
September 22	No. 4 Georgia Tech	McLean Stadium; Lexington, KY	L 6–14	30,000	
September 29	at No. 9 Ole Miss	Crump Stadium; Memphis, TN	L 7–37	25,101	
October 6	at Florida	Florida Field; Gainesville, FL (rivalry)	W 17–8	26,000	
October 13	Auburn	McLean Stadium; Lexington, KY	L 0–13	32,000	
October 20	LSU	McLean Stadium; Lexington, KY	W 14–0		
October 27	at Georgia	Sanford Stadium; Athens, GA	W 14–7		
November 3	at Maryland*	Byrd Stadium; College Park, MD	W 14–0	20,000	
November 10	Vanderbilt	McLean Stadium; Lexington, KY (rivalry)	W 7–6		
November 17	Xavier*	McLean Stadium; Lexington, KY	W 33–0		
November 24	at No. 2 Tennessee	Shields–Watkins Field; Knoxville, TN (rivalry)	L 7–20	45,000	
*Non-conference game; Rankings from Coaches' Poll released prior to the game
