= 1956 Wake Forest Demon Deacons football team =

American college football season

1956 Wake Forest Demon Deacons football
- Conference: Atlantic Coast Conference
- Record: 2–5–3 (1–5–1 ACC)
- Head coach: Paul Amen (1st season)
- Captains: Bill Barnes; David Lee
- Home stadium: Bowman Gray Stadium

1956 Atlantic Coast Conference football standings
	Conf.					Overall
Team	W		L		T	W		L		T
No. 19 Clemson $	4	–	0	–	1	7	–	2	–	2
Duke	4	–	1	–	0	5	–	4	–	1
South Carolina	5	–	2	–	0	7	–	3	–	0
Maryland	2	–	2	–	1	2	–	7	–	1
North Carolina	2	–	3	–	1	2	–	7	–	1
NC State	2	–	4	–	0	3	–	7	–	0
Wake Forest	1	–	5	–	1	2	–	5	–	3
Virginia	1	–	4	–	0	3	–	7	–	0
Rankings from AP poll

The 1956 Wake Forest Demon Deacons football team was an American football team that represented Wake Forest University during the 1956 college football season. In their first season under head coach Paul Amen, the Demon Deacons compiled a 2–5–3 record and finished in seventh place in the Atlantic Coast Conference with a 1–5–1 record against conference opponents.

Halfback Billy Ray Barnes rushed for over 1,000 yards and was selected by the Associated Press as a first-team player on the 1956 All-Atlantic Coast Conference football team.

== Schedule ==
Date	Time	Opponent	Site	Result	Attendance	Source
September 22		at William & Mary*	Cary Field; Williamsburg, VA	W 39–0	8,500	
September 29		Maryland	Bowman Gray Stadium; Winston-Salem, NC	L 0–6	13,000	
October 6		at Virginia	Scott Stadium; Charlottesville, VA	L 6–7	13,000	
October 13		Clemson	Bowman Gray Stadium; Winston-Salem, NC	L 0–17	13,000	
October 20		at Florida State*	Doak Campbell Stadium; Tallahassee, FL	T 14–14	14,000	
October 27		at North Carolina	Kenan Memorial Stadium; Chapel Hill, NC (rivalry)	T 6–6	27,000	
November 3		NC State	Bowman Gray Stadium; Winston-Salem, NC (rivalry)	W 13–0	14,000	
November 10		at VPI*	Miles Stadium; Blacksburg, VA	T 13–13	7,000	
November 17		Duke	Bowman Gray Stadium; Winston-Salem, NC (rivalry)	L 0–26	5,000–6,000	
November 22	1:00 p.m.	vs. South Carolina	American Legion Memorial Stadium; Charlotte, NC	L 0–13	12,072	
*Non-conference game

== Team leaders ==
Category	Team Leader	Att/Cth	Yds
Passing	Charlie Carpenter	34/91	495
Rushing	Billy Ray Barnes	168	1,010
Receiving	Jack Ladner	12	125
