= 1956 Baylor Bears football team =

American college football season

1956 Baylor Bears football

Sugar Bowl champion

Sugar Bowl, W 13–7 vs. Tennessee
- Conference: Southwest Conference

Ranking
- Coaches: No. 11
- AP: No. 11
- Record: 9–2 (4–2 SWC)
- Head coach: Sam Boyd (1st season)
- Captains: Robert T. Jones; Tony DeGrazier
- Home stadium: Baylor Stadium

1956 Southwest Conference football standings
	Conf.					Overall
Team	W		L		T	W		L		T
No. 5 Texas A&M $	6	–	0	–	0	9	–	0	–	1
No. 14 TCU	5	–	1	–	0	8	–	3	–	0
No. 11 Baylor	4	–	2	–	0	9	–	2	–	0
Arkansas	3	–	3	–	0	6	–	4	–	0
SMU	2	–	4	–	0	4	–	6	–	0
Rice	1	–	5	–	0	4	–	6	–	0
Texas	0	–	6	–	0	1	–	9	–	0
$ – Conference champion; Rankings from AP Poll

The 1956 Baylor Bears football team represented Baylor University as a member of the Southwest Conference (SWC) during the 1956 college football season. Led by first-year head coach Sam Boyd, the Bears compiled an overall record of 9–2 with a mark of 4–2 in conference play, placing third in the SWC. Baylor was invited to the Sugar Bowl, where the Bears defeated Tennessee. The team played home games at Baylor Stadium in Waco, Texas.

Guard Bill Glass was a consensus selection to the College Football All-America Team. Glass, halfback Del Shofner and end Jerry Marcontell were selected to the All-Southwest Conference team.

== Schedule ==
Date	Opponent	Rank	Site	Result	Attendance	Source
September 22	at California*		California Memorial Stadium; Berkeley, CA	W 7–6	36,000	
September 29	Texas Tech*		Baylor Stadium; Waco, TX (rivalry)	W 27–0	15,000	
October 6	at Maryland*	No. 16	Byrd Stadium; College Park, MD	W 14–0	25,000	
October 13	at Arkansas	No. 10	Razorback Stadium; Fayetteville, AR	W 14–7	20,000	
October 27	No. 7 Texas A&M^{†}	No. 8	Baylor Stadium; Waco, TX (rivalry)	L 13–19	49,500	
November 3	at TCU	No. 15	Amon G. Carter Stadium; Fort Worth, TX (rivalry)	L 6–7	20,000	
November 10	Texas		Baylor Stadium; Waco, TX (rivalry)	W 10–7	21,000	
November 17	at Nebraska*		Memorial Stadium; Lincoln, NE	W 26–7	31,775	
November 24	at SMU	No. 16	Cotton Bowl; Dallas, TX	W 26–0	28,000	
December 1	Rice	No. 15	Baylor Stadium; Waco, TX	W 46–13	20,000	
January 1, 1957	vs. No. 2 Tennessee*	No. 11	Tulane Stadium; New Orleans, LA (Sugar Bowl)	W 13–7	81,000	
*Non-conference game; ^{†}Homecoming; Rankings from AP Poll released prior to the game
