= 1956 SMU Mustangs football team =

American college football season

1956 SMU Mustangs football
- Conference: Southwest Conference
- Record: 4–6 (2–4 SWC)
- Head coach: Woody Woodard (4th season)
- Captains: Bill Livingstone; Smitty Keller
- Home stadium: Cotton Bowl

1956 Southwest Conference football standings
	Conf.					Overall
Team	W		L		T	W		L		T
No. 5 Texas A&M $	6	–	0	–	0	9	–	0	–	1
No. 14 TCU	5	–	1	–	0	8	–	3	–	0
No. 11 Baylor	4	–	2	–	0	9	–	2	–	0
Arkansas	3	–	3	–	0	6	–	4	–	0
SMU	2	–	4	–	0	4	–	6	–	0
Rice	1	–	5	–	0	4	–	6	–	0
Texas	0	–	6	–	0	1	–	9	–	0
$ – Conference champion; Rankings from AP Poll

The 1956 SMU Mustangs football team represented Southern Methodist University (SMU) as a member of the Southwest Conference (SWC) during the 1956 college football season. Led by Woody Woodard in his fourth and final season as head coach, the Mustangs compiled an overall record of 4–6 with a mark of 2–4 in conference play, placing fifth in the SWC. SMU played home games at the Cotton Bowl in Dallas. Bill Livingstone and Smitty Keller were the team captains.

== Schedule ==
Date	Opponent	Rank	Site	Result	Attendance	Source
September 22	No. 3 Notre Dame*		Cotton Bowl; Dallas, TX	W 19–13	61,000	
September 29	No. 2 Georgia Tech*	No. 5	Cotton Bowl; Dallas, TX	L 7–9	46,500	
October 6	at Missouri*	No. 12	Memorial Stadium; Columbia, MO	W 33–27	25,000	
October 13	at Duke*	No. 19	Duke Stadium; Durham, NC	L 6–14	25,000	
October 20	at Rice		Rice Stadium; Houston, TX (rivalry)	W 14–13	47,000	
November 3	at Texas		Memorial Stadium; Austin, TX	W 20–19	35,000	
November 10	No. 5 Texas A&M		Cotton Bowl; Dallas, TX	L 7–33	62,500	
November 17	at Arkansas		War Memorial Stadium; Little Rock, AR	L 13–27	34,000	
November 24	No. 16 Baylor		Cotton Bowl; Dallas, TX	L 0–26	28,000	
December 1	No. 14 TCU		Cotton Bowl; Dallas, TX (rivalry)	L 6–21	32,500	
*Non-conference game; Rankings from AP Poll released prior to the game
