= 1956 Maryland Terrapins football team =

American college football season

1956 Maryland Terrapins football
- Conference: Atlantic Coast Conference
- Record: 2–7–1 (2–2–1 ACC)
- Head coach: Tommy Mont (1st season)
- Offensive scheme: Split-T
- Home stadium: Byrd Stadium

1956 Atlantic Coast Conference football standings
	Conf.					Overall
Team	W		L		T	W		L		T
No. 19 Clemson $	4	–	0	–	1	7	–	2	–	2
Duke	4	–	1	–	0	5	–	4	–	1
South Carolina	5	–	2	–	0	7	–	3	–	0
Maryland	2	–	2	–	1	2	–	7	–	1
North Carolina	2	–	3	–	1	2	–	7	–	1
NC State	2	–	4	–	0	3	–	7	–	0
Wake Forest	1	–	5	–	1	2	–	5	–	3
Virginia	1	–	4	–	0	3	–	7	–	0
Rankings from AP poll

The 1956 Maryland Terrapins football team represented the University of Maryland in the 1956 college football season as a member of the Atlantic Coast Conference. They were led by first-year head coach Tommy Mont, who had been promoted from backfield assistant after Jim Tatum left to take over at North Carolina. Preseason hopes were high for the team, but it suffered numerous injuries and other misfortunes. Maryland finished with a 2–7–1 record, and the Associated Press called it "one of the year's most disappointing football teams".

== Schedule ==
Date	Opponent	Rank	Site	Result	Attendance	Source
September 22	Syracuse*	No. 6	Byrd Stadium; College Park, MD	L 12–26	27,000	
September 29	at Wake Forest		Bowman Gray Stadium; Winston-Salem, NC	W 6–0	13,000	
October 6	No. 16 Baylor*		Byrd Stadium; College Park, MD	L 0–14	25,000	
October 12	at No. 11 Miami (FL)*		Burdine Stadium; Miami, FL	L 6–13	44,304	
October 20	at North Carolina		Kenan Memorial Stadium; Chapel Hill, NC	L 6–34	21,000	
October 27	No. 4 Tennessee*		Shields–Watkins Field; Knoxville, TN	L 7–34	33,500	
November 3	Kentucky*^{†}		Byrd Stadium; College Park, MD	L 0–14	20,000	
November 10	No. 11 Clemson		Byrd Stadium; College Park, MD	T 6–6	18,000	
November 17	at South Carolina		Carolina Stadium; Columbia, SC	L 0–13	25,000	
November 22	at NC State		Riddick Stadium; Raleigh, NC	W 25–14	4,500	
*Non-conference game; ^{†}Homecoming; Rankings from AP Poll released prior to the game

== Before the season ==
Maryland head coach Jim Tatum resigned on January 8, 1956, to take the same post at his alma mater, North Carolina, and he was replaced by backfield coach Tommy Mont. Mont was a former quarterback for Maryland and the Washington Redskins. Mont came with the personal recommendation of Tatum. Tatum also instructed his former players to stay at Maryland rather than follow him by transferring to North Carolina.

As head coach, Mont was unable to recruit the highly skilled athletes that Tatum had consistently secured during his tenure. Rod Breedlove, who played on freshman team in 1956 and started on the varsity squad thereafter, was an exception as one of the best guard prospects in the nation. Due to the pressures associated with coaching a major college program, Mont eventually resigned as head coach after the 1958 season in order to take the same position at DePauw University.

=== Personnel ===
The 1956 team consisted of the following letterwinners:

- Gene Alderton
- Ronald Athey
- Al Beardsley
- Bill Burgly
- Fred Cole
- Nick DeCicco
- John Fritsch
- Fred Hamilton
- Jim Hatter
- Don Healy
- Ed Heuring
- Ted Kershner
- Charles Kichman
- George Kolarac
- Bill Kolmo
- Bob Layman
- Dickie Lewis
- Wilbur Main
- Bob Rusevlyan
- Mike Sandusky
- Ben Scotti
- Tom Selep
- Jim Skarda
- Tom Stefl
- Bob Suchy
- Paul Tonetti
- Bill Turner
- Jean Waters
- Al Wharton

The coaching staff consisted of:

- Tommy Mont, head coach
- Ed Fullerton
- William Dovell
- Johnny Idzik, line coach
- Fred Layman
- Roy Lester, ends coach
- Joe Moss
- Jim Peebles
- Bob Ward

== Season ==
Maryland entered 1956 ranked number-six in the Associated Press preseason poll. The previous year, the freshman Terrapins finished with an undefeated record, and Sports Illustrated had called it the "best freshman team in the entire South." Before resigning his post as head coach, Jim Tatum had said before the 1956 Orange Bowl, "Our 1956 squad will have the greatest potential of all, despite the loss of ten seniors."

The roster, however, was depleted by injuries and the team beset by bad luck in general. The 1957 edition of The Terrapin yearbook wrote the most serious blow to the team's prospects occurred when would-be starting quarterback Frank Tamburello was drafted into the Army. Maryland lost another returner when back Phil Perlo did not re-enroll at the school. In another twist of fate, the entire team had to be inoculated against jaundice after starting halfback Howie Dare and a reserve center were diagnosed with the malady. Dare would miss the entire season.

In the season opener, Syracuse soundly defeated Maryland, 26–12, which in part, "rudely jolted" the preseason prognostications of many college football experts. After the Terrapins edged Wake Forest, 6–0, 16th-ranked Baylor handed Maryland its first shutout, 14–0, in 70 games. The following week at the Orange Bowl, 13th-ranked Miami resorted to the air to beat Maryland, 13–6. After the loss, the Associated Press called the Terrapins squad "one of the year's most disappointing football teams."

Led by former Terrapins' coach Jim Tatum, North Carolina decisively beat Maryland, 34–6, in one of its two wins of the season. Both Carolina victories, however, were later vacated due to use of an ineligible player, although Maryland records still credit the Tar Heels with the win.

A week later, Johnny Majors led third-ranked Tennessee to beat Maryland, 34–7, and completed three touchdown passes while "hitting his receivers with the accuracy of a mountaineer rifleman." After a loss to Kentucky, Maryland tied 11th-ranked Clemson, which had hoped to secure its invitation to the Orange Bowl as the ACC representative.

Maryland lost at South Carolina, 13–0, and then traveled to Raleigh to face North Carolina State. Maryland trailed in the second half, but a 103-yard interception return from the Terrapins' end zone by back Dickie Lewis sparked a comeback. Maryland won, 25–14, to finish the season with a 2–7–1 mark.

After the season, The Baltimore Sun described Mont and quarterback John Fritsch as "two of the biggest fall guys in college football this year" for events beyond their control.
