= 1956 Rice Owls football team =

American college football season

1956 Rice Owls football
- Conference: Southwest Conference
- Record: 4–6 (1–5 SWC)
- Head coach: Jess Neely (17th season)
- Home stadium: Rice Stadium

1956 Southwest Conference football standings
	Conf.					Overall
Team	W		L		T	W		L		T
No. 5 Texas A&M $	6	–	0	–	0	9	–	0	–	1
No. 14 TCU	5	–	1	–	0	8	–	3	–	0
No. 11 Baylor	4	–	2	–	0	9	–	2	–	0
Arkansas	3	–	3	–	0	6	–	4	–	0
SMU	2	–	4	–	0	4	–	6	–	0
Rice	1	–	5	–	0	4	–	6	–	0
Texas	0	–	6	–	0	1	–	9	–	0
$ – Conference champion; Rankings from AP Poll

The 1956 Rice Owls football team represented Rice Institute during the 1956 college football season. The Owls were led by 17th-year head coach Jess Neely and played their home games at Rice Stadium in Houston, Texas. They competed as members of the Southwest Conference, finishing in sixth.

== Schedule ==
Date	Opponent	Site	Result	Attendance	Source
September 22	Alabama*	Rice Stadium; Houston, TX	W 20–13	43,000	
October 6	LSU*	Rice Stadium; Houston, TX	W 23–14	55,000	
October 13	at Florida*	Florida Field; Gainesville, FL	L 0–7	26,000	
October 20	SMU	Rice Stadium; Houston, TX (rivalry)	L 13–14	47,000	
October 27	Texas	Rice Stadium; Houston, TX (rivalry)	W 28–7	67,000	
November 3	Utah*	Rice Stadium; Houston, TX	W 27–0	22,000	
November 10	at Arkansas	Razorback Stadium; Fayetteville, AR	L 12–27	24,000	
November 17	at No. 5 Texas A&M	Kyle Field; College Station, TX	L 7–21	36,000	
November 24	No. 18 TCU	Rice Stadium; Houston, TX	L 17–20	43,000	
December 1	at No. 15 Baylor	Baylor Stadium; Waco, TX	L 13–46	20,000	
*Non-conference game; Rankings from AP Poll released prior to the game
