= 1956 North Carolina Tar Heels football team =

American college football season

1956 North Carolina Tar Heels football
- Conference: Atlantic Coast Conference
- Record: 2–7–1 (2–3–1 ACC)
- Head coach: Jim Tatum (2nd season)
- Captains: George Stavnitski; Ed Sutton
- Home stadium: Kenan Memorial Stadium

1956 Atlantic Coast Conference football standings
	Conf.					Overall
Team	W		L		T	W		L		T
No. 19 Clemson $	4	–	0	–	1	7	–	2	–	2
Duke	4	–	1	–	0	5	–	4	–	1
South Carolina	5	–	2	–	0	7	–	3	–	0
Maryland	2	–	2	–	1	2	–	7	–	1
North Carolina	2	–	3	–	1	2	–	7	–	1
NC State	2	–	4	–	0	3	–	7	–	0
Wake Forest	1	–	5	–	1	2	–	5	–	3
Virginia	1	–	4	–	0	3	–	7	–	0
Rankings from AP poll

The 1956 North Carolina Tar Heels football team represented the University of North Carolina at Chapel Hill during the 1956 college football season. The Tar Heels were led by head coach Jim Tatum, who was coaching his second season for the Tar Heels, but his first since 1942. They played their home games at Kenan Memorial Stadium. The team competed as a member of the Atlantic Coast Conference, finishing in fifth.

North Carolina was forced to forfeit its two wins and one tie from the 1956 season after it was discovered that an ineligible player had played in the first nine games of the season. Second-string end Vince Olenik had previously played football at Temple University, but was not registered with the NCAA or ACC as a transfer student. However, the ACC and NCAA now recognize North Carolina's 1956 record as 2–7–1.

== Schedule ==
Date	Time	Opponent	Site	Result	Attendance	Source
September 22	2:00 p.m.	NC State	Kenan Memorial Stadium; Chapel Hill, NC (rivalry)	L 6–26	37,000	
September 29	3:00 p.m.	at No. 1 Oklahoma*	Oklahoma Memorial Stadium; Norman, OK	L 0–36	57,559	
October 6	2:30 p.m.	at South Carolina	Carolina Stadium; Columbia, SC (rivalry)	L 0–14	20,000	
October 13	2:00 p.m.	Georgia*	Kenan Memorial Stadium; Chapel Hill, NC	L 12–26	19,000	
October 20	2:00 p.m.	Maryland	Kenan Memorial Stadium; Chapel Hill, NC	W 34–6	21,000	
October 27	2:00 p.m.	Wake Forest	Kenan Memorial Stadium; Chapel Hill, NC (rivalry)	T 6–6	27,000	
November 3	2:00 p.m.	at No. 3 Tennessee*	Shields–Watkins Field; Knoxville, TN	L 0–20	27,000	
November 10	1:30 p.m.	at Virginia	Scott Stadium; Charlottesville, VA (South's Oldest Rivalry)	W 21–7	16,000	
November 17	2:00 p.m.	at Notre Dame*	Notre Dame Stadium; Notre Dame, IN (rivalry)	L 14–21	56,793	
November 24	2:00 p.m.	Duke	Kenan Memorial Stadium; Chapel Hill, NC (Victory Bell)	L 6–21	36,000	
*Non-conference game; Rankings from AP Poll released prior to the game; All times are in Eastern time
