= 1956 Clemson Tigers football team =

American college football season

1956 Clemson Tigers football

ACC champion

Orange Bowl, L 21–27 to Colorado
- Conference: Atlantic Coast Conference

Ranking
- AP: No. 19
- Record: 7–2–2 (4–0–1 ACC)
- Head coach: Frank Howard (17th season)
- Captain: Charlie Bussey
- Home stadium: Memorial Stadium

1956 Atlantic Coast Conference football standings
	Conf.					Overall
Team	W		L		T	W		L		T
No. 19 Clemson $	4	–	0	–	1	7	–	2	–	2
Duke	4	–	1	–	0	5	–	4	–	1
South Carolina	5	–	2	–	0	7	–	3	–	0
Maryland	2	–	2	–	1	2	–	7	–	1
North Carolina	2	–	3	–	1	2	–	7	–	1
NC State	2	–	4	–	0	3	–	7	–	0
Wake Forest	1	–	5	–	1	2	–	5	–	3
Virginia	1	–	4	–	0	3	–	7	–	0
Rankings from AP poll

The 1956 Clemson Tigers football team was an American football team that represented Clemson College in the Atlantic Coast Conference (ACC) during the 1956 college football season. In its 17th season under head coach Frank Howard, the team compiled a 7–2–2 record (4–0–1 against conference opponents), won the ACC championship, was ranked No. 19 in the final AP Poll, lost to Colorado in the 1957 Orange Bowl, and outscored all opponents by a total of 167 to 101. The team played its home games at Memorial Stadium in Clemson, South Carolina.

Quarterback Charlie Bussey was the team captain. The team's statistical leaders included Bussey with 330 passing yards and left halfback Joel Wells with 803 rushing yards and 48 points (8 touchdowns).

Four Clemson players were selected by the Associated Press or the United Press to the first or second teams of the 1956 All-Atlantic Coast Conference football team: Joel Wells (AP-1, UP-1); Charlie Bussey (AP-1, UP-2); guard John Grdijan (AP-2, UP-1); and tackle Dick Maraza (AP-2). Four Clemson players were also named to the 1956 All-South Carolina football team: Joel Wells, guards John Grdijan and Earle Greene, and tackle Billy Hudson.

== Schedule ==
Date	Time	Opponent	Rank	Site	Result	Attendance	Source
September 22	8:00 p.m.	Presbyterian*		Memorial Stadium; Clemson, SC	W 27–7	18,000	
September 29	2:30 p.m.	at No. 19 Florida*		Florida Field; Gainesville, FL	T 20–20	28,000	
October 6	8:00 p.m.	at NC State		Riddick Stadium; Raleigh, NC (rivlary)	W 13–7	15,000	
October 13	2:00 p.m.	at Wake Forest		Bowman Gray Stadium; Winston-Salem, NC	W 17–0	13,000	
October 25	2:00 p.m.	at South Carolina	No. 20	Carolina Stadium; Columbia, SC (rivalry)	W 7–0	35,000	
November 3	2:00 p.m.	No. 16 VPI*^{†}	No. 13	Memorial Stadium; Clemson, SC	W 21–6	23,000	
November 10	2:00 p.m.	at Maryland	No. 11	Byrd Stadium; College Park, MD	T 6–6	18,000	
November 16	8:15 p.m.	at No. 8 Miami (FL)*	No. 13	Burdine Stadium; Miami, FL	L 0–21	47,603	
November 24	2:00 p.m.	Virginia		Memorial Stadium; Clemson, SC	W 7–0	16,000	
December 1	2:00 p.m.	Furman*		Memorial Stadium; Clemson, SC	W 28–7		
January 1, 1957		vs. No. 20 Colorado*	No. 19	Burdine Stadium; Miami, FL (Orange Bowl)	L 21–27	72,552	
*Non-conference game; ^{†}Homecoming; Rankings from AP Poll released prior to the game; All times are in Eastern time

== After the season ==
The 1957 NFL Draft was held on November 26, 1956. The following Tigers were selected.

Round	Pick	Player	Position	NFL club
2	18	Joel Wells	Back	Green Bay Packers
3	34	Bill Hudson	Defensive tackle	Chicago Cardinals
