= 1956 Arkansas Razorbacks football team =

American college football season

1956 Arkansas Razorbacks football
- Conference: Southwest Conference
- Record: 6–4 (3–3 SWC)
- Head coach: Jack Mitchell (2nd season)
- Captains: Neil Martin; Ted Souter
- Home stadium: Razorback Stadium; War Memorial Stadium

1956 Southwest Conference football standings
	Conf.					Overall
Team	W		L		T	W		L		T
No. 5 Texas A&M $	6	–	0	–	0	9	–	0	–	1
No. 14 TCU	5	–	1	–	0	8	–	3	–	0
No. 11 Baylor	4	–	2	–	0	9	–	2	–	0
Arkansas	3	–	3	–	0	6	–	4	–	0
SMU	2	–	4	–	0	4	–	6	–	0
Rice	1	–	5	–	0	4	–	6	–	0
Texas	0	–	6	–	0	1	–	9	–	0
$ – Conference champion; Rankings from AP Poll

The 1956 Arkansas Razorbacks football team represented the University of Arkansas in the Southwest Conference (SWC) during the 1956 college football season. In their third year under head coach Jack Mitchell, the Razorbacks compiled a 6–4 record (3–3 against SWC opponents), finished in fourth place in the SWC, and outscored all opponents by a combined total of 160 to 155.

== Schedule ==
Date	Opponent	Site	Result	Attendance	Source
September 22	Hardin–Simmons*	Razorback Stadium; Fayetteville, AR	W 21–6	19,000	
September 29	Oklahoma A&M*	War Memorial Stadium; Little Rock, AR	W 19–7	32,000	
October 6	at No. 8 TCU	Amon G. Carter Stadium; Fort Worth, TX	L 6–41	28,000	
October 13	No. 10 Baylor	Razorback Stadium; Fayetteville, AR	L 7–14	20,000	
October 20	at Texas	Memorial Stadium; Austin, TX (rivalry)	W 32–14	40,000	
October 27	No. 10 Ole Miss*	War Memorial Stadium; Little Rock, AR (rivalry)	W 14–0	35,500	
November 3	at No. 5 Texas A&M	Kyle Field; College Station, TX (rivalry)	L 0–27	27,000	
November 10	Rice^{†}	Razorback Stadium; Fayetteville, AR	W 27–12	24,000	
November 17	SMU	War Memorial Stadium; Little Rock, AR	W 27–13	34,000	
November 24	at LSU*	State Fair Stadium; Shreveport, LA (rivalry)	L 7–21	28,000	
*Non-conference game; ^{†}Homecoming; Rankings from AP Poll released prior to the game
