= 1956 Texas A&M Aggies football team =

American college football season

1956 Texas A&M Aggies football

SWC champion
- Conference: Southwest Conference

Ranking
- Coaches: No. 5
- AP: No. 5
- Record: 9–0–1 (6–0 SWC)
- Head coach: Bear Bryant (3rd season)
- Home stadium: Kyle Field

1956 Southwest Conference football standings
	Conf.					Overall
Team	W		L		T	W		L		T
No. 5 Texas A&M $	6	–	0	–	0	9	–	0	–	1
No. 14 TCU	5	–	1	–	0	8	–	3	–	0
No. 11 Baylor	4	–	2	–	0	9	–	2	–	0
Arkansas	3	–	3	–	0	6	–	4	–	0
SMU	2	–	4	–	0	4	–	6	–	0
Rice	1	–	5	–	0	4	–	6	–	0
Texas	0	–	6	–	0	1	–	9	–	0
$ – Conference champion; Rankings from AP Poll

The 1956 Texas A&M Aggies football team represented Texas A&M University in the 1956 college football season. The team won the Southwest Conference and compiled an overall record of 9–0–1, including a 6–0 record in conference play. However, the Aggies were on probation and not allowed to play in a bowl game. The team was coached by Paul "Bear" Bryant.

== Schedule ==
Date	Opponent	Rank	Site	Result	Attendance	Source
September 22	Villanova*	No. 9	Kyle Field; College Station, TX	W 19–0	15,000	
September 29	at LSU*	No. 11	Tiger Stadium; Baton Rouge, LA (rivalry)	W 9–6	61,000	
October 6	vs. Texas Tech*	No. 11	Cotton Bowl; Dallas, TX (rivalry)	W 40–7	32,500	
October 13	at Houston*	No. 9	Rice Stadium; Houston, TX	T 14–14	67,009	
October 20	No. 4 TCU	No. 14	Kyle Field; College Station, TX (rivalry)	W 7–6	42,000	
October 27	at No. 8 Baylor	No. 7	Baylor Stadium; Waco, TX (rivalry)	W 19–13	49,500	
November 3	Arkansas	No. 5	Kyle Field; College Station, TX (rivalry)	W 27–0	27,000	
November 10	at SMU	No. 5	Cotton Bowl; Dallas, TX	W 33–7	62,500	
November 17	Rice	No. 5	Kyle Field; College Station, TX	W 21–7	36,000	
November 29	at Texas	No. 4	Memorial Stadium; Austin, TX (rivalry)	W 34–21	61,000	
*Non-conference game; Rankings from AP Poll released prior to the game
