= 1956 Georgia Tech Yellow Jackets football team =

American college football season

1956 Georgia Tech Yellow Jackets football

National champion (Berryman, Sagarin) Gator Bowl champion

Gator Bowl, W 21–14 vs. Pittsburgh
- Conference: Southeastern Conference

Ranking
- Coaches: No. 4
- AP: No. 4
- Record: 10–1 (7–1 SEC)
- Head coach: Bobby Dodd (12th season)
- Captains: Wade Mitchell; George Volkert
- Home stadium: Grant Field

1956 Southeastern Conference football standings
	Conf.					Overall
Team	W		L		T	W		L		T
No. 2 Tennessee $	6	–	0	–	0	10	–	1	–	0
No. 4 Georgia Tech	7	–	1	–	0	10	–	1	–	0
Florida	5	–	2	–	0	6	–	3	–	1
Ole Miss	4	–	2	–	0	7	–	3	–	0
Auburn	4	–	3	–	0	7	–	3	–	0
Kentucky	4	–	4	–	0	6	–	4	–	0
Tulane	3	–	3	–	0	6	–	4	–	0
Vanderbilt	2	–	5	–	0	5	–	5	–	0
Alabama	2	–	5	–	0	2	–	7	–	1
Mississippi State	2	–	5	–	0	4	–	6	–	0
LSU	1	–	5	–	0	3	–	7	–	0
Georgia	1	–	6	–	0	3	–	6	–	1
$ – Conference champion; Rankings from AP Poll

The 1956 Georgia Tech Yellow Jackets football team was an American football team that represented Georgia Tech as a member of the Southeastern Conference (SEC) during the 1956 college football season. In their 12th year under head coach Bobby Dodd, the team compiled an overall record of 10–1, with a mark of 7–1 in conference play, and finished second in the SEC.

Georgia Tech was the preseason favorite to win the Southeastern Conference, but their hopes of reaching the Sugar Bowl were crushed when the Johnny Majors-led Tennessee Volunteers beat the Yellow Jackets in Atlanta, 0–6. Georgia Tech cruised through the rest of their schedule and finished the regular season with the Tennessee game as their only blemish, finishing second in the SEC and ranked number 4 in the country in the final AP Poll. They accepted an invitation to the 1956 Gator Bowl, where they beat Pittsburgh, in a rematch of the 1956 Sugar Bowl, 21–14. This was the sixth straight season for Georgia Tech that ended with a bowl victory. The team was selected national champion by both Berryman and Sagarin (ELO-Chess).

After the season in early January, backfield coach (and alumnus) Frank Broyles was hired as head coach at the University of Missouri in the Big Eight Conference.

== Schedule ==
Date	Opponent	Rank	Site	TV	Result	Attendance	Source
September 22	at Kentucky	No. 4	McLean Stadium; Lexington, KY	NBC	W 14–6	30,000	
September 29	at No. 5 SMU*	No. 2	Cotton Bowl; Dallas, TX		W 9–7	46,500	
October 13	LSU	No. 3	Grant Field; Atlanta, GA		W 39–7	39,500	
October 20	Auburn	No. 3	Grant Field; Atlanta, GA (rivalry)		W 28–7	40,000	
October 27	No. 15 Tulane^{†}	No. 3	Grant Field; Atlanta, GA		W 40–0	40,000	
November 3	at Duke*	No. 2	Duke Stadium; Durham, NC		W 7–0	38,000	
November 10	No. 3 Tennessee	No. 2	Grant Field; Atlanta, GA (rivalry)		L 0–6	40,000	
November 17	Alabama	No. 4	Grant Field; Atlanta, GA (rivalry)		W 27–0	38,500	
November 24	vs. No. 13 Florida	No. 5	Gator Bowl Stadium; Jacksonville, FL		W 28–0	37,000	
December 1	at Georgia	No. 4	Sanford Stadium; Athens, GA (rivalry)		W 35–0	50,000	
December 29	vs. No. 13 Pittsburgh*	No. 4	Gator Bowl Stadium; Jacksonville, FL (Gator Bowl)	CBS	W 21–14	37,683	
*Non-conference game; ^{†}Homecoming; Rankings from AP Poll released prior to the game
