= 1965 Iowa State Cyclones football team =

American college football season

1965 Iowa State Cyclones football
- Conference: Big Eight Conference
- Record: 5–4–1 (3–3–1 Big 8)
- Head coach: Clay Stapleton (8th season)
- Captains: Dick Kasperek; Jimmy Wipert
- Home stadium: Clyde Williams Field

1965 Big Eight Conference football standings
	Conf.					Overall
Team	W		L		T	W		L		T
No. 5 Nebraska $	7	–	0	–	0	10	–	1	–	0
No. 6 Missouri	6	–	1	–	0	8	–	2	–	1
Colorado	4	–	2	–	1	6	–	2	–	2
Iowa State	3	–	3	–	1	5	–	4	–	1
Oklahoma	3	–	4	–	0	3	–	7	–	0
Oklahoma State	2	–	5	–	0	3	–	7	–	0
Kansas	2	–	5	–	0	2	–	8	–	0
Kansas State	0	–	7	–	0	0	–	10	–	0
$ – Conference champion; Rankings from AP Poll

The 1965 Iowa State Cyclones football team represented Iowa State University in the Big Eight Conference during the 1965 NCAA University Division football season. In their eighth year under head coach Clay Stapleton, the Cyclones compiled a 5–4–1 record (3–3–1 against conference opponents), finished in fourth place in the conference, and outscored their opponents by a combined total of 178 to 147. They played their home games at Clyde Williams Field in Ames, Iowa.

The regular starting lineup on offense consisted of left end Eppie Barney, left tackle John Chism, left guard Dennis Storey, right guard Rick Burchett, right tackle Larry Brazon, right end George Maurer, quarterback Tim Van Galder, halfbacks Les Webster and Tom Busch, and fullback Tony Baker.

The regular starting lineup on defense consisted of defensive ends Dennis Esselmann and Ernie Kennedy, defensive tackles Wayne Lueders and Sam Ramenofsky, defensive guards Bob Evans and Frank Belichick, linebackers Jim Wipert and Ron Halda, cornerbacks Doug Robinson and Larry Carwell, and safety Cal Lewis. Steve Balkovec was the punter and placekicker.

Dick Kasperek and Jimmy Wipert were the team captains. Three Iowa State players were selected as first-team all-conference players: Eppie Barney, Ron Halda, and Dick Kasperek.

== Schedule ==
Date	Time	Opponent	Site	Result	Attendance	Source
September 18	1:30 pm	Drake*	Clyde Williams Field; Ames, IA	W 21–0	9,500	
September 25	1:30 pm	Pacific (CA)*	Clyde Williams Field; Ames, IA	W 38–13	16,000	
October 2	2:00 pm	at No. 3 Nebraska	Memorial Stadium; Lincoln, NE (rivalry)	L 0–44	54,125	
October 9	1:30 pm	at Kansas	Memorial Stadium; Lawrence, KS	W 21–7	38,500	
October 16	1:30 pm	at Colorado	Folsom Field; Boulder, CO	T 10–10	25,500	
October 23	1:30 pm	Missouri	Clyde Williams Field; Ames, IA (rivalry)	L 7–23	20,500	
October 30	1:30 pm	Oklahoma State^{†}	Clyde Williams Field; Ames, IA	W 14–10	20,500	
November 6	1:30 pm	at Oklahoma	Oklahoma Memorial Stadium; Norman, OK	L 20–24	45,000	
November 13	1:30 pm	Kansas State	Clyde Williams Field; Ames, IA (rivalry)	W 38–6	13,000	
November 20	1:30 pm	at New Mexico*	University Stadium; Albuquerque, NM	L 9–10	17,346	
*Non-conference game; ^{†}Homecoming; Rankings from AP Poll released prior to the game; All times are in Central time; Source:
