= 1965 Nebraska Cornhuskers football team =

American college football season

1965 Nebraska Cornhuskers football

Big 8 champion

Orange Bowl (NCG), L 28–39 vs. Alabama
- Conference: Big Eight Conference

Ranking
- Coaches: No. 3
- AP: No. 5
- Record: 10–1 (7–0 Big 8)
- Head coach: Bob Devaney (4th season)
- Home stadium: Memorial Stadium

1965 Big Eight Conference football standings
	Conf.					Overall
Team	W		L		T	W		L		T
No. 5 Nebraska $	7	–	0	–	0	10	–	1	–	0
No. 6 Missouri	6	–	1	–	0	8	–	2	–	1
Colorado	4	–	2	–	1	6	–	2	–	2
Iowa State	3	–	3	–	1	5	–	4	–	1
Oklahoma	3	–	4	–	0	3	–	7	–	0
Oklahoma State	2	–	5	–	0	3	–	7	–	0
Kansas	2	–	5	–	0	2	–	8	–	0
Kansas State	0	–	7	–	0	0	–	10	–	0
$ – Conference champion; Rankings from AP Poll

The 1965 Nebraska Cornhuskers football team was the representative of the University of Nebraska and member of the Big Eight Conference in the 1965 NCAA University Division football season. The team was coached by Bob Devaney and played their home games at Memorial Stadium in Lincoln, Nebraska.

== Schedule ==
Date	Time	Opponent	Rank	Site	TV	Result	Attendance	Source
September 18	2:00 pm	TCU*	No. 1	Memorial Stadium; Lincoln, NE		W 34–14	53,650	
September 25	2:30 pm	at Air Force*	No. 2	Falcon Stadium; Colorado Springs, CO		W 27–17	37,056	
October 2	2:00 pm	Iowa State	No. 3	Memorial Stadium; Lincoln, NE (rivalry)		W 44–0	54,125	
October 9	2:00 pm	Wisconsin*	No. 2	Memorial Stadium; Lincoln, NE (rivalry)		W 37–0	53,810	
October 16	1:30 pm	at Kansas State	No. 2	Memorial Stadium; Manhattan, KS (rivalry)		W 41–0	20,000	
October 23	2:00 pm	Colorado^{†}	No. 3	Memorial Stadium; Lincoln, NE (rivalry)		W 38–13	54,110	
October 30	1:30 pm	at Missouri	No. 3	Memorial Stadium; Columbia, MO (rivalry)		W 16–14	58,000	
November 6	2:00 pm	Kansas	No. 3	Memorial Stadium; Lincoln, NE (rivalry)		W 42–6	53,910	
November 13	1:30 pm	at Oklahoma State	No. 3	Lewis Field; Stillwater, OK		W 21–17	31,500	
November 25	12:45 pm	Oklahoma	No. 3	Memorial Stadium; Lincoln, NE (rivalry)	NBC	W 21–9	52,865	
January 1, 1966	7:00 pm	vs. No. 4 Alabama*	No. 3	Miami Orange Bowl; Miami, FL (Orange Bowl)	NBC	L 28–39	72,214	
*Non-conference game; ^{†}Homecoming; Rankings from AP Poll released prior to the game; All times are in Central time; Source:

== Roster ==
Official Roster
67 Allers, LaVerne LG (Jr.); 33 Alvarez, Barry LB (So.); 77 Barnes, Walter MG (Sr.); 39 Beck, Dennis S (So.); 76 Brichacek, Gary RT (Jr.); 24 Brown, Bill FB (So.); 73 Brown, James OT (Sr.); 40 Brunk, Kenny FB (Jr.); 41 Buckler, George FB (So.); 68 Canarsky, Leonard RT (So.); 78 Carlson, Dennis RT (Sr.); 21 Carstens, Kaye CB (Jr.); 89 Casey, Larry E (Sr.); 15 Churchich, Bob QB (Jr.); 62 Coleman, (Edward) Ricard LB (Jr.); 80 Coleman, Langston DE (Jr.); 35 Critchlow, Paul HB (So.); 70 Czap, Dick DT (Jr.); 92 Delaney, Dan E (So.); 55 Drum, Duncan C (Sr.); 10 Duda, Fred QB (Sr.); 11 Fierro, Al QB (So.); 65 Gatziolis, Jim RG (Jr.); 81 Grace, Mike DE (Jr.); 22 Gregory, Ben FB (So.); 57 Grell, Stan LG (Jr.); 38 Haasch, Richard FB (So.); 58 Hansen, Ed RT (So.); 79 Hansen, Larry DT (So.); 87 Haug, William DE (Sr.); 32 Hawkins, James CB (So.); 53 Hill, Robert C (Jr.); 43 Janik, Leonard LB (So.); 84 Jeter, Tony E (Sr.); 28 Johnson, William LB (Sr.); 69 Kennedy, Michael LB (Sr.); 91 Kimmel, Miles E (So.); 20 Kirkland, Ron HB (Jr.); 61 Kudrna, Roger LB (Jr.); 42 Kuehl, Alan LB (So.); 95 Mackevicius, Al C (So.)	64 McCord, M.Jim DT (So.); 66 Meylan, Wayne RG (So.); 37 Morrison, Dennis FB (So.); 30 Mueller, Marv DB (So.); 52 Murphy, Jerry MG (Jr.); 56 Narish, Louis DT (Jr.); 17 Nettelmann, Bill S (So.); 59 Osberg, James RG (Jr.); 34 Pappas, Tom LB (Jr.); 88 Patton, Jerry DE (So.); 54 Petersen, Kelly C (Jr.); 26 Poggemeyer, Ronald S (Jr.); 82 Richnafsky, Dennis SE (So.); 51 Schaefer, Steve MG (Sr.); 93 Schindel, Bill OT (So.); 63 Senkbeil, Lynn LB (Jr.); 12 Sigler, Ernie QB (So.); 83 Smith, Tom E (Jr.); 45 Solich, Frank HB (Sr.); 90 Startzer, Bill DE (So.); 72 Stith, Carel DT (Jr.); 74 Strohmyer, John DT (Sr.); 48 Tatman, Pete FB (Jr.); 75 Taucher, Robert OT (So.); 25 Thorell, Dennis CB (Jr.); 50 Tuthill, Harry C (Sr.); 19 Unis, Joe LG (Jr.); 46 Vactor, Theodore (Red) S (Sr.); 36 Wachholtz, Larry S (Jr.); 18 Walls, Don DT (So.); 14 Weber, Wayne QB (So.); 47 Weinman, Bob CB (Jr.); 85 White, Freeman E (Sr.); 71 Wilks, Jerry OT (Jr.); 31 Wilson, Harry FB (Jr.); 44 Winters, Charlie FB (So.); 49 Worley, Michael FB (Sr.); 23 Zemko, Steve LB (So.); 29 Ziegler, Mick HB (So.); 86 Zimmer, Ivan DE (So.)

== Depth chart ==
Defensive starters

HB
Marv Mueller
Ted Vactor
Dennis Beck

HB
Larry Wachholtz
Ronald Poggemeyer
Bill Nettelmann

LB	LB
Michael Kennedy	Lynn Senkbeil
Barry Alvarez	Rick Coleman
	Tom Pappas

CB
William Johnson
Alan Kuehl

DE	DT	NT	DT	DE
Jerry Patton	Dick Czap	Walter Barnes	Wayne Meylan	Langston Coleman
Leonard Janik; Bill Haug (injured)	Carel Stith	Jerry Murphy	John Strohmyer	Ivan Zimmer
Mike Grace		Steve Schaefer	Louis Narish	Larry Hansen

CB
Kaye Carstens
Dennis Thorell
Bob Weinman

Offensive starters

TE
Tony Jeter
Larry Casey
Dan Delaney

LT	LG	C	RG	RT
James Brown	LaVerne Allers	Kelly Petersen	James Osberg	Dennis Carlson
Robert Taucher	Roger Kudrna	Duncan Drum	Jim McCord	Gary Brichacek
Jerry Wilks	Stan Grell	Robert Hill	Jim Gatziolis	Ed Hansen

TE
Freeman White
Dennis Richnafsky
Tom Smith

QB
Bob Churchich
Fred Duda
Wayne Weber

LB	RB	FB
Ron Kirkland	Harry Wilson	Frank Solich
Pete Tatman	Ben Gregory	Charlie Winters
Mick Ziegler	Richard Haasch	Kenny Brunk

== Coaching staff ==
Name	Title	First year in this position	Years at Nebraska	Alma mater
Bob Devaney	Head coach	1962	1962–1972	Alma
Tom Osborne		1964	1964–1997	Hastings
John Melton		1962	1962–1988	Wyoming
Cletus Fischer		1960	1960–1985	Nebraska
Mike Corgan	Running backs	1962	1962–1982	Notre Dame
George Kelly		1960	1960–1968	
Jim Ross		1962	1962–1976	
Carl Selmer	Offensive line	1962	1962–1972	

== Game summaries ==
=== TCU ===
Team	1	2	3	4	Total
TCU	0	7	0	7	14
• #1 Nebraska	14	7	7	6	34

- Location: Memorial Stadium, Lincoln, Nebraska
- Game attendance: 53,650

=== Air Force ===
Team	1	2	3	4	Total
• #2 Nebraska	21	0	6	0	27
Air Force	0	7	10	0	17

- Location: Falcon Stadium, Colorado Springs, Colorado
- Game attendance: 37,479

=== Iowa State ===
Team	1	2	3	4	Total
Iowa State	0	0	0	0	0
• #3 Nebraska	0	16	21	7	44

- Location: Memorial Stadium, Lincoln, Nebraska
- Game attendance: 54,440

=== Wisconsin ===
Team	1	2	3	4	Total
Wisconsin	0	0	0	0	0
• #2 Nebraska	6	11	14	6	37

- Location: Memorial Stadium, Lincoln, Nebraska
- Game attendance: 53,641

=== Kansas State ===
Team	1	2	3	4	Total
• #2 Nebraska	0	21	6	14	41
Kansas State	0	0	0	0	0

- Date: October 16
- Location: Memorial Stadium, Manhattan, Kansas
- Game attendance: 19,660

=== Colorado ===
Team	1	2	3	4	Total
Colorado	3	3	0	7	13
• #3 Nebraska	17	14	0	7	38

- Date: October 23
- Location: Memorial Stadium, Lincoln, Nebraska
- Game attendance: 53,873

=== Missouri ===
Team	1	2	3	4	Total
• #3 Nebraska	0	13	0	3	16
Missouri	14	0	0	0	14

- Date: October 30
- Location: Faurot Field, Columbia, Missouri
- Game attendance: 57,206

=== Kansas ===
Team	1	2	3	4	Total
Kansas	0	6	0	0	6
• #3 Nebraska	7	14	21	0	42

- Date: November 6
- Location: Memorial Stadium, Lincoln, Nebraska
- Game attendance: 54,118

=== Oklahoma State ===
Team	1	2	3	4	Total
• #3 Nebraska	0	7	7	7	21
Oklahoma State	7	0	0	10	17

- Date: November 13
- Location: Lewis Field, Stillwater, Oklahoma
- Game attendance: 29,901

=== Oklahoma ===
Team	1	2	3	4	Total
Oklahoma	3	6	0	0	9
• #3 Nebraska	0	7	14	0	21

- Date: November 25
- Location: Memorial Stadium, Lincoln, Nebraska
- Game attendance: 52,533

=== Alabama ===
Team	1	2	3	4	Total
#3 Nebraska	0	7	6	15	28
• #4 Alabama	7	17	8	7	39

- Date: January 1
- Location: Miami Orange Bowl, Miami, Florida
- Game attendance: 72,214
- Referee: Morris Harrison

== Rankings ==
Ranking movements Legend: ██ Increase in ranking ██ Decrease in ranking
	Week											
Poll	Pre	1	2	3	4	5	6	7	8	9	10	Final
AP	1	2	3	2	2	3	3	3	3	3	3	5
Coaches	N/A	N/A	N/A	N/A	N/A	N/A	N/A	N/A	N/A	N/A	N/A	3

== Awards ==
- All American: Walter Barnes, Tony Jeter, Larry Wachholtz, Freeman White
- All Big 8: LaVerne Allers, Dennis Carlson, Walt Barnes, Tony Jeter, Muike Kennedy, Frank Solich, Larry Wachholtz, Freeman White

== Future professional players ==
- Walter Barnes, 1966 2nd-round pick of the Washington Redskins
- James Brown, 1966 13th-round pick of the St. Louis Cardinals
- Kaye Carstens, 1967 13th-round pick of the Chicago Bears
- Dick Czap, 1966 12th-round pick of the Cleveland Browns
- Ben Gregory, 1968 5th-round pick of the Buffalo Bills
- Tony Jeter, 1966 3rd-round pick of the Green Bay Packers
- Ron Kirkland, 1967 9th-round pick of the Indianapolis Colts
- Wayne Meylan, 1968 4th-round pick of the Cleveland Browns
- Lynn Senkbeil, 1966 16th-round pick of the Chicago Bears
- Carel Stith, 1967 4th-round pick of the Houston Oilers
- Bob Taucher, 1968 7th-round pick of the Dallas Cowboys
- Pete Tatman, 1967 10th-round pick of the Minnesota Vikings
- Freeman White, 1966 9th-round pick of the New York Giants
- Harry Wilson, 1967 3rd-round pick of the Philadelphia Eagles
