= 1966 Nebraska Cornhuskers football team =

American college football season

1966 Nebraska Cornhuskers football

Big 8 champion

Sugar Bowl, L 7–34 vs. Alabama
- Conference: Big Eight Conference

Ranking
- Coaches: No. 7
- AP: No. 6
- Record: 9–2 (6–1 Big 8)
- Head coach: Bob Devaney (5th season)
- Home stadium: Memorial Stadium

1966 Big Eight Conference football standings
	Conf.					Overall
Team	W		L		T	W		L		T
No. 6 Nebraska $	6	–	1	–	0	9	–	2	–	0
Colorado	5	–	2	–	0	7	–	3	–	0
Missouri	4	–	2	–	1	6	–	3	–	1
Oklahoma State	4	–	2	–	1	4	–	5	–	1
Oklahoma	4	–	3	–	0	6	–	4	–	0
Iowa State	2	–	3	–	2	2	–	6	–	2
Kansas	0	–	6	–	1	2	–	7	–	1
Kansas State	0	–	6	–	1	0	–	9	–	1
$ – Conference champion; Rankings from AP Poll

The 1966 Nebraska Cornhuskers football team represented the University of Nebraska–Lincoln as a member of the Big Eight Conference in the 1966 NCAA University Division football season. The team was coached by Bob Devaney and played their home games at Memorial Stadium in Lincoln, Nebraska.

== Schedule ==
Date	Time	Opponent	Rank	Site	TV	Result	Attendance	Source
September 17	2:00 pm	TCU*	No. 3	Memorial Stadium; Lincoln, NE		W 14–10	60,974	
September 24	2:00 pm	Utah State*	No. 4	Memorial Stadium; Lincoln, NE		W 28–7	63,543	
October 1	12:30 pm	at Iowa State	No. 6	Clyde Williams Field; Ames, IA (rivalry)		W 12–6	28,000	
October 8	12:30 pm	at Wisconsin*	No. 7	Camp Randall Stadium; Madison, WI		W 31–3	52,428	
October 15	2:00 pm	Kansas State^{†}	No. 6	Memorial Stadium; Lincoln, NE (rivalry)		W 21–10	64,108	
October 22	1:30 pm	at Colorado	No. 7	Folsom Field; Boulder CO (rivalry)		W 21–19	46,112	
October 29	12:15 pm	Missouri	No. 8	Memorial Stadium; Lincoln, NE (rivalry)	ABC	W 35–0	65,095	
November 5	1:30PM	at Kansas	No. 6	Memorial Stadium; Lawrence, KS (rivalry)		W 24–13	45,500	
November 12	2:00PM	Oklahoma State	No. 4	Memorial Stadium; Lincoln, NE		W 21–6	65,102	
November 24	2:00PM	at Oklahoma	No. 4	Oklahoma Memorial Stadium; Norman, OK (rivalry)	ABC	L 9–10	41,000	
January 2, 1967	1:00 pm	vs. No. 3 Alabama*	No. 6	Tulane Stadium; New Orleans, LA (Sugar Bowl)	NBC	L 7–34	82,000	
*Non-conference game; ^{†}Homecoming; Rankings from AP Poll released prior to the game; All times are in Central time; Source:

== Roster ==
Official Roster
2 Ahlschwede, Bob LG (So.); 67 Allers, LaVerne LG (Sr.); 55 Alvarez, Barry LB (Jr.); 65 Armstrong, Joe RG (So.); 90 Ashman, Carl LT (So.); 8 Beechner, Sam S (So.); 27 Best, Bob S (So.); 76 Brichacek, Gary LT (Sr.); 69 Brichacek, Mel LG (So.); 40 Brunk, Kenny HB (Jr.); 41 Buckler, George FB (Jr.); 52 Buda, Joe C (So.); 95 Buda, Sam DT (So.); 68 Canarsky, Leonard LT (So.); 21 Carstens, Kaye CB (Sr.); 71 Casbeer, Tom DT (So.); 15 Churchich, Bob QB (Sr.); 62 Coleman, (Edward)Ricard LB (Sr.); 80 Coleman, Langston DT (Sr.); 99 Cooper, Louis DT (So.); 35 Critchlow, Paul FB (So.); 70 Czap, Dick DT (Sr.); 13 Daiss, Bill CB (So.); 45 Davis, Dick HB (So.); 92 Delaney, Dan DE (So.); 32 Fiala, Adrian CB (So.); 11 Fierro, Al QB (So.); 74 Fitzgerald, Richard LT (Sr.); 28 Frost, Larry HB (So.); 47 Galbraith, Denis FB (So.); 78 Gatziolis, Jim RT (Sr.); 3 Green, Laurie CB (So.); 34 Green, Mike HB (So.); 22 Gregory, Ben HB (Jr.); 57 Grell, Stan LG (Sr.); 38 Haasch, Richard HB (Jr.); 58 Hansen, Ed LT (So.); 79 Hansen, Larry DT (Jr.); 16 Harding, Bruce QB (So.); 39 Hartman, Dan S (So.); 53 Hill, Robert C (Sr.); 98 Hornbacher, Bill MG (So.); 43 Janik, Leonard LB (Jr.); 81 Jarmon, Sherwin E (So.); 4 Jubeck, Tom FB (So.); 84 Kimmel, Miles E (So.); 20 Kirkland, Ron HB (Sr.); 13 Kobza, Dan LB (So.); 61 Kudrna, Roger RG (Sr.)	42 Kuehl, Alan CB (Jr.); 94 Kusserow, Ken C (So.); 91 Liggett, Bob DE (So.); 49 Lints, Bob MG (So.); 93 McCarthy, Curtis DE (So.); 64 McCord, M.Jim DT (Jr.); 58 Meagher, Harry MG (Jr.); 66 Meylan, Wayne MG (Jr.); 37 Moore, Bob DE (So.); 89 Morrison, Dennis E (Jr.); 30 Mueller, Marv CB (Jr.); 56 Narish, Louis DT (Sr.); 17 Nettelmann, Bill S (Jr.); 59 Osberg, James RG (Sr.); 33 Pappas, Tom LB (Sr.); 10 Patrick, Frank QB (So.); 88 Patton, Jerry DE (Jr.); 77 Pavoris, Ed DT (Sr.); 85 Penney, Tom E (So.); 54 Petersen, Kelly C (Sr.); 73 Pickens, Robert RT (Sr.); 26 Poggemeyer, Ronald S (Sr.); 6 Quinten, Karl CB (So.); 5 Raymondi, Mike LB (So.); 82 Richnafsky, Dennis SE (Jr.); 97 Rudd, Michael RG (Sr.); 63 Senkbeil, Lynn LB (Sr.); 12 Sigler, Ernie QB (So.); 83 Smith, Tom E (Jr.); 50 Stigge, Russ LB (So.); 72 Stith, Carel DT (Sr.); 48 Tatman, Pete FB (Sr.); 75 Taucher, Robert RT (Jr.); 25 Thorell, Dennis S (Sr.); 51 Unrath, James C (Sr.); 36 Wachholtz, Larry S (Sr.); 18 Walls, Don MG (Jr.); 46 Washington, Joe DE (So.); 7 Watson, Jim S (So.); 14 Weber, Wayne QB (Jr.); 90 Weinman, Bob DE (Jr.); 96 Wilks, Jerry RT (Sr.); 31 Wilson, Harry HB (Sr.); 44 Winters, Charlie FB (Jr.); 87 Wynn, Mike E (So.); 24 Yannon, Buster HB (So.); 1 Young, Lynn RT (So.); 29 Ziegler, Mick HB (So.); 86 Zimmer, Ivan DE (Jr.)

== Depth chart ==
Defensive starters

HB
Dennis Thorell
Bob Best

HB
Larry Wachholtz
Ronald Poggemeyer

LB	LB
Rick Coleman	Lynn Senkbeil
Barry Alvarez	Leonard Janik

CB
Marv Mueller
Alan Kuehl

DE	DT	NT	DT	DE
Jerry Patton	Jim McCord	Wayne Meylan	Carel Sith	Langston Coleman
Dan Delancey	Lou Narish	Harry Meagher	Bob Lints	Bob Weinman

CB
Kaye Carstens
Adrian Fiala

Offensive starters

TE
Dennis Morrison
Miles Kimmel

LT	LG	C	RG	RT
Gary Brichacek	LaVerne Allers	Kelly Petersen	Joe Armstrong	Robert Pickens
Ed Hansen	Mel Brichacek	Robert Hill	James Osberg	Robert Taucher

TE
Tom Penney
Dennis Richnafsky

QB
Bob Churchich
Wayne Weber

LB	RB	FB
Ron Kirkland	Harry Wilson	Pete Tatman
Ben Gregory	Dick Davis	Charlie Winters

== Coaching staff ==
Name	Title	First year in this position	Years at Nebraska	Alma mater
Bob Devaney	Head coach	1962	1962–1972	Alma
Tom Osborne		1964	1964–1997	Hastings
John Melton	Freshman	1962	1962–1988	Wyoming
Cletus Fischer	Freshman Line	1960	1960–1985	Nebraska
Mike Corgan	Offensive backs	1962	1962–1982	Notre Dame
George Kelly	Defensive line	1960	1960–1968	
Monte Kiffin	Graduate assistant	1966	1966–1976	Nebraska
Jim Ross	Defensive backs	1962	1962–1976	
Carl Selmer	Offensive line	1962	1962–1972	

== Game summaries ==
=== TCU ===
Team	1	2	3	4	Total
TCU	0	7	3	0	10
• #3 Nebraska	7	7	0	0	14

- Location: Memorial Stadium, Lincoln, Nebraska
- Game attendance: 60,974

=== Utah State ===
Team	1	2	3	4	Total
Utah State	0	0	7	0	7
• #4 Nebraska	7	0	3	18	28

- Location: Memorial Stadium, Lincoln, Nebraska
- Game attendance: 63,543

=== Iowa State ===
Team	1	2	3	4	Total
• #6 Nebraska	6	0	0	6	12
Iowa State	0	6	0	0	6

- Location: Clyde Williams Field, Ames, Iowa
- Game attendance: 28,543

=== Wisconsin ===
Team	1	2	3	4	Total
• #7 Nebraska	3	7	14	7	31
Wisconsin	3	0	0	0	3

- Location: Camp Randall Stadium, Madison, Wisconsin
- Game attendance: 52,428

=== Kansas State ===
Team	1	2	3	4	Total
Kansas State	0	0	3	7	10
• #6 Nebraska	7	7	0	7	21

- Date: October 15
- Location: Memorial Stadium, Lincoln, Nebraska
- Game attendance: 64,108

=== Colorado ===
Team	1	2	3	4	Total
• #7 Nebraska	7	0	0	14	21
Colorado	6	13	0	0	19

- Date: October 22
- Location: Folsom Field, Boulder, Colorado
- Game attendance: 46,112

=== Missouri ===
Team	1	2	3	4	Total
Missouri	0	0	0	0	0
• #8 Nebraska	0	14	14	7	35

- Date: October 29
- Location: Memorial Stadium, Lincoln, Nebraska
- Game attendance: 64,489

=== Kansas ===
Team	1	2	3	4	Total
• #6 Nebraska	0	18	0	6	24
Kansas	0	0	7	6	13

- Date: November 5
- Location: Memorial Stadium, Lawrence, Kansas
- Game attendance: 40,881

=== Oklahoma State ===
Team	1	2	3	4	Total
Oklahoma State	0	6	0	0	6
• #4 Nebraska	0	7	7	7	21

- Date: November 12
- Location: Memorial Stadium, Lincoln, Nebraska
- Game attendance: 65,102

=== Oklahoma ===
Team	1	2	3	4	Total
#4 Nebraska	0	3	6	0	9
• Oklahoma	0	7	0	3	10

- Date: November 24
- Location: Oklahoma Memorial Stadium, Norman, Oklahoma
- Game attendance: 42,884
- TV announcers (ABC): Chris Schenkel, Bud Wilkinson

=== Alabama ===
Team	1	2	3	4	Total
#6 Nebraska	0	0	0	7	7
• #3 Alabama	17	7	3	7	34

- Date: January 2
- Location: Tulane Stadium, New Orleans
- Game attendance: 82,000
- Referee: Earl Jensen

== Rankings ==
Ranking movements Legend: ██ Increase in ranking ██ Decrease in ranking
	Week											
Poll	Pre	1	2	3	4	5	6	7	8	9	10	Final
AP	3	4	6	7	6	7	8	6	4	4	6	6
Coaches	N/A	N/A	N/A	N/A	N/A	N/A	N/A	N/A	N/A	N/A	N/A	7

== Awards ==
- NCAA 5th District Coach of the Year: Bob Devaney
- UPI Big 8 Player of the Year: Wayne Meylan
- All American: LaVerne Allers, Wayne Meylan, Larry Wachholtz
- All Big 8: LaVerne Allers, Kaye Carstens, Bob Churchich, Wayne Meylan, Kelly Petersen, Bob Pickens, Lynn Senkbeil, Carel Stith, Larry Wachholtz, Harry Wilson

== Future professional players ==
- Kaye Carstens, 1967 13th-round pick of the Chicago Bears
- Dick Czap, 1966 12th-round pick of the Cleveland Browns
- Dick Davis, 1969 12th-round pick of the Cleveland Browns
- Ben Gregory, 1968 5th-round pick of the Buffalo Bills
- Ron Kirkland, 1967 9th-round pick of the Indianapolis Colts
- Wayne Meylan, 1968 4th-round pick of the Cleveland Browns
- Bob Pickens, 1966 3rd-round pick of the Bears
- Carel Stith, 1967 4th-round pick of the Houston Oilers
- Bob Taucher, 1968 7th-round pick of the Dallas Cowboys
- Pete Tatman, 1967 10th-round pick of the Minnesota Vikings
- Harry Wilson, 1967 3rd-round pick of the Philadelphia Eagles
