= 1966 Oklahoma Sooners football team =

American college football season

1966 Oklahoma Sooners football
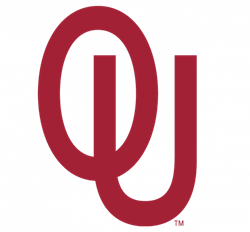
- Conference: Big Eight Conference
- Record: 6–4 (4–3 Big 8)
- Head coach: Jim Mackenzie (1st season)
- Offensive coordinator: Barry Switzer (1st season)
- Defensive coordinator: Chuck Fairbanks (1st season)
- Captains: Ed Hall; Jim Riley
- Home stadium: Oklahoma Memorial Stadium

1966 Big Eight Conference football standings
	Conf.					Overall
Team	W		L		T	W		L		T
No. 6 Nebraska $	6	–	1	–	0	9	–	2	–	0
Colorado	5	–	2	–	0	7	–	3	–	0
Missouri	4	–	2	–	1	6	–	3	–	1
Oklahoma State	4	–	2	–	1	4	–	5	–	1
Oklahoma	4	–	3	–	0	6	–	4	–	0
Iowa State	2	–	3	–	2	2	–	6	–	2
Kansas	0	–	6	–	1	2	–	7	–	1
Kansas State	0	–	6	–	1	0	–	9	–	1
$ – Conference champion; Rankings from AP Poll

The 1966 Oklahoma Sooners football team represented the University of Oklahoma during the 1966 NCAA University Division football season. Led by first-year head coach Jim Mackenzie, they played their home games at Oklahoma Memorial Stadium and competed as members of the Big Eight Conference.

A longtime assistant at Arkansas, Mackenzie was hired in December 1965.

Following one of the worst seasons in program history, the Sooners improved to 6–4, defeated rival Texas for the first time in nine years, and upset undefeated rival Nebraska on Thanksgiving, Mackenzie was named the Coach of the Year in the Big Eight.

== Schedule ==
Date	Opponent	Rank	Site	TV	Result	Attendance	Source
September 17	Oregon*		Oklahoma Memorial Stadium; Norman, OK		W 17–0	48,590	
September 24	at Iowa State		Clyde Williams Field; Ames, IA		W 33–11	22,000	
October 8	vs. Texas*		Cotton Bowl; Dallas, TX (Red River Shootout)		W 18–9	75,504	
October 15	at Kansas		Memorial Stadium; Lawrence, KS		W 35–0	41,500	
October 22	No. 1 Notre Dame*	No. 10	Oklahoma Memorial Stadium; Norman, OK		L 0–38	63,439	
October 29	at Colorado		Folsom Field; Boulder, CO		L 21–24	36,200	
November 5	Kansas State		Oklahoma Memorial Stadium; Norman, OK		W 37–6	43,900	
November 12	Missouri		Oklahoma Memorial Stadium; Norman, OK (rivalry)		L 7–10	57,650	
November 24	No. 4 Nebraska		Oklahoma Memorial Stadium; Norman, OK (rivalry)	ABC	W 10–9	41,000	
December 3	at Oklahoma State		Lewis Field; Stillwater, OK (Bedlam Series)		L 14–15	38,000	
*Non-conference game; Rankings from AP Poll released prior to the game; Source:

== Game summaries ==
=== Oregon ===
Team	1	2	3	4	Total
Oregon	0	0	0	0	0
• Oklahoma	0	0	17	0	17

- Date: September 17
- Location: Oklahoma Memorial Stadium
- Game attendance: 48,590

=== Iowa State ===
Team	1	2	3	4	Total
• Oklahoma	14	3	9	7	33
Iowa St	2	9	0	0	11

- Date: September 24
- Location: Clyde Williams Field
- Game attendance: 21,467

=== Texas ===
Team	1	2	3	4	Total
Texas	3	0	0	6	9
• Oklahoma	6	3	3	6	18

- Date: October 8
- Location: Cotton Bowl
- Game attendance: 75,504

Scoring summary
Q1		TEX	Conway 25 yard field goal	TEX 3-0
Q1		OKLA	Warmack 1 yard run (kick failed)	OKLA 6-3
Q2		OKLA	Vachon 31 yard field goal	OKLA 9-3
Q3		OKLA	Vachon 43 yard field goal	OKLA 12-3
Q4		OKLA	Vachon 20 yard field goal	OKLA 15-3
Q4		TEX	White 2 yard run (pass failed)	OKLA 15-9
Q4	2:19	OKLA	Vachon 41 yard field goal	OKLA 18-9

=== Kansas ===
Team	1	2	3	4	Total
• Oklahoma	7	7	14	7	35
Kansas	0	0	0	0	0

- Date: October 15
- Location: Memorial Stadium
- Game attendance: 37,252

=== Notre Dame ===
Team	1	2	3	4	Total
• Notre Dame	0	17	21	0	38
Oklahoma	0	0	0	0	0

- Date: October 22
- Location: Oklahoma Memorial Stadium
- Game attendance: 62,626

=== Colorado ===
Team	1	2	3	4	Total
Oklahoma	7	0	14	0	21
• Colorado	7	0	10	7	24

- Date: October 29
- Location: Folsom Field
- Game attendance: 35,738

=== Kansas State ===
Team	1	2	3	4	Total
Kansas St	0	0	0	6	6
• Oklahoma	0	10	13	14	37

- Date: November 5
- Location: Oklahoma Memorial Stadium
- Game attendance: 44,792

=== Missouri ===
Team	1	2	3	4	Total
• Missouri	0	0	10	0	10
Oklahoma	0	0	0	7	7

- Date: November 12
- Location: Oklahoma Memorial Stadium
- Game attendance: 55,585

=== Nebraska ===
Team	1	2	3	4	Total
Nebraska	0	3	6	0	9
• Oklahoma	0	7	0	3	10

- Date: November 24
- Location: Oklahoma Memorial Stadium
- TV announcers (ABC): Chris Schenkel, Bud Wilkinson

=== Oklahoma State ===
Team	1	2	3	4	Total
Oklahoma	0	0	8	6	14
• Oklahoma St	0	8	0	7	15

- Date: December 3
- Location: Lewis Field

== Rankings ==
Ranking movements Legend: ██ Increase in ranking ██ Decrease in ranking — = Not ranked
	Week												
Poll	Pre	1	2	3	4	5	6	7	8	9	10	11	Final
AP	—	—	—	—	—	10	—	—	—	—	—	—	—

== NFL/AFL draft ==
The following players were drafted into the National Football League or American Football League following the season.

Round	Pick	Player	Position	NFL team
2	29	Jim Riley	Tackle	Miami Dolphins
3	80	Ben Hart	Running back	New Orleans Saints
4	96	James Roy Jackson	Wide receiver	Oakland Raiders
9	236	Eugene Ross	Defensive back	New Orleans Saints
13	292	Tom Stidham	Kicker	New York Giants
