= 1966 Iowa State Cyclones football team =

American college football season

1966 Iowa State Cyclones football
- Conference: Big Eight Conference
- Record: 2–6–2 (2–3–2 Big 8)
- Head coach: Clay Stapleton (9th season)
- Captains: Bob Evans; Dick Schafroth
- Home stadium: Clyde Williams Field

1966 Big Eight Conference football standings
| | Conf. | | | | | Overall |
| Team | W | | L | | T | W | | L | | T |
|---|---|---|---|---|---|---|---|---|---|---|
| No. 6 Nebraska $ | 6 | – | 1 | – | 0 | 9 | – | 2 | – | 0 |
| Colorado | 5 | – | 2 | – | 0 | 7 | – | 3 | – | 0 |
| Missouri | 4 | – | 2 | – | 1 | 6 | – | 3 | – | 1 |
| Oklahoma State | 4 | – | 2 | – | 1 | 4 | – | 5 | – | 1 |
| Oklahoma | 4 | – | 3 | – | 0 | 6 | – | 4 | – | 0 |
| Iowa State | 2 | – | 3 | – | 2 | 2 | – | 6 | – | 2 |
| Kansas | 0 | – | 6 | – | 1 | 2 | – | 7 | – | 1 |
| Kansas State | 0 | – | 6 | – | 1 | 0 | – | 9 | – | 1 |
$ – Conference champion; Rankings from AP Poll

The 1966 Iowa State Cyclones football team represented Iowa State University in the Big Eight Conference during the 1966 NCAA University Division football season. In their ninth year under head coach Clay Stapleton, the Cyclones compiled a 2–6–2 record (2–3–2 against conference opponents), finished in sixth place in the conference, and were outscored by opponents by a combined total of 211 to 160. They played their home games at Clyde Williams Field in Ames, Iowa.

The regular starting lineup on offense consisted of ends Eppie Barney and George Maurer, tackles Dick Schafroth and Ted Tuinstra, guards Dennis Storey and Bill Brooks, center Don Stanley, quarterback Tim Van Galder, halfbacks Les Webster and Tom Busch, and fullback Willie Robinson.

The regular starting lineup on defense consisted of defensive ends Sam Campbell and Don Graves, defensive tackles Willie Muldrew and Dennis Esselmann, defensive guards Bob Evans and Ted Hall, linebackers Terry Voy and Alan Staidl, cornerbacks Doug Robinson and Larry Carwell, and safety Cal Lewis.

Harry Alley was the punter, and Tom Busch was the placekicker.

Bob Evans and Dick Schafroth were the team captains.

== Schedule ==
| Date | Time | Opponent | Site | Result | Attendance | Source |
|---|---|---|---|---|---|---|
| September 17 | 1:30 pm | at Wisconsin* | Camp Randall Stadium; Madison, WI | L 10–20 | 51,051 | |
| September 24 | 1:30 pm | Oklahoma | Clyde Williams Field; Ames, IA | L 11–33 | 22,000 | |
| October 1 | 1:30 pm | No. 6 Nebraska | Clyde Williams Field; Ames, IA (rivalry) | L 6–12 | 28,000 | |
| October 8 | 1:30 pm | Kansas | Clyde Williams Field; Ames, IA | W 24–7 | 22,000 | |
| October 15 | 1:30 pm | Colorado^{†} | Clyde Williams Field; Ames, IA | L 21–41 | 24,000 | |
| October 22 | 1:30 pm | at Missouri | Memorial Stadium; Columbia, MO (rivalry) | T 10–10 | 47,000 | |
| October 29 | 2:30 pm | at Oklahoma State | Lewis Field; Stillwater, OK | T 14–14 | 33,500 | |
| November 12 | 1:30 pm | at Kansas State | Memorial Stadium; Manhattan, KS (rivalry) | W 30–13 | 9,500 | |
| November 19 | 9:00 pm | at Arizona* | Arizona Stadium; Tucson, AZ | L 24–27 | 23,904 | |
| November 26 | 2:30 pm | at Colorado State* | Colorado Field; Fort Collins, CO | L 10–34 | 9,268 | |
*Non-conference game; ^{†}Homecoming; Rankings from AP Poll released prior to the game; All times are in Central time; Source:
