= 1965 Missouri Tigers football team =

American college football season

1965 Missouri Tigers football

Sugar Bowl champion

Sugar Bowl, W 20–18 vs. Florida
- Conference: Big Eight Conference

Ranking
- Coaches: No. 6
- AP: No. 6
- Record: 8–2–1 (6–1 Big 8)
- Head coach: Dan Devine (8th season)
- Home stadium: Memorial Stadium

1965 Big Eight Conference football standings
	Conf.					Overall
Team	W		L		T	W		L		T
No. 5 Nebraska $	7	–	0	–	0	10	–	1	–	0
No. 6 Missouri	6	–	1	–	0	8	–	2	–	1
Colorado	4	–	2	–	1	6	–	2	–	2
Iowa State	3	–	3	–	1	5	–	4	–	1
Oklahoma	3	–	4	–	0	3	–	7	–	0
Oklahoma State	2	–	5	–	0	3	–	7	–	0
Kansas	2	–	5	–	0	2	–	8	–	0
Kansas State	0	–	7	–	0	0	–	10	–	0
$ – Conference champion; Rankings from AP Poll

The 1965 Missouri Tigers football team was an American football team that represented the University of Missouri in the Big Eight Conference (Big 8) during the 1965 NCAA University Division football season. The team compiled an 8–2–1 record (6–1 against Big 8 opponents), finished in second place in the Big 8, defeated Florida in the 1966 Sugar Bowl, was ranked No. 6 in the final AP Poll, and outscored opponents by a combined total of 223 to 101. Dan Devine was the head coach for the eighth of 13 seasons. The team played its home games at Memorial Stadium in Columbia, Missouri.

The team's statistical leaders included Charlie Brown with 937 rushing yards, Gary Lane with 544 passing yards, 994 yards of total offense, and 54 point scored, and Monroe Phelps with 207 receiving yards.

== Schedule ==
Date	Opponent	Rank	Site	TV	Result	Attendance	Source
September 18	Kentucky*		Memorial Stadium; Columbia, MO		L 0–7	44,550	
September 25	at Oklahoma State		Lewis Field; Stillwater, OK		W 13–0	24,000	
October 2	at Minnesota*		Memorial Stadium; Minneapolis, MN		W 17–6	49,889	
October 9	Kansas State		Memorial Stadium; Columbia, MO		W 28–6	49,000	
October 16	UCLA*		Memorial Stadium; Columbia, MO		T 14–14	47,000	
October 23	at Iowa State		Clyde Williams Field; Ames, IA (rivalry)		W 23–7	20,500	
October 30	No. 3 Nebraska^{†}		Memorial Stadium; Columbia, MO (rivalry)		L 14–16	58,000	
November 6	at Colorado	No. 9	Folsom Field; Boulder, CO		W 20–7	32,500	
November 13	Oklahoma	No. 9	Memorial Stadium; Columbia, MO (rivalry)		W 30–0	51,014	
November 20	at Kansas	No. 8	Memorial Stadium; Lawrence, KS (Border War)	NBC	W 44–20	44,000	
January 1	vs. Florida*	No. 6	Tulane Stadium; New Orleans, LA (Sugar Bowl)	NBC	W 20–18	67,421	
*Non-conference game; ^{†}Homecoming; Rankings from AP Poll released prior to the game; Source:

== Personnel ==
- OT Francis Peay, Sr.
