= 1965 Gator Bowl =

The 1965 Gator Bowl may refer to:

- 1965 Gator Bowl (January), January 2, 1965, game between the Florida State Seminoles and the Oklahoma Sooners
- 1965 Gator Bowl (December), December 31, 1965, game between the Georgia Tech Yellow Jackets and the Texas Tech Red Raiders
