= 1965 Oklahoma State Cowboys football team =

American college football season

1965 Oklahoma State Cowboys football
- Conference: Big Eight Conference
- Record: 3–7 (2–5 Big 8)
- Head coach: Phil Cutchin (3rd season)
- Home stadium: Lewis Field

1965 Big Eight Conference football standings
	Conf.					Overall
Team	W		L		T	W		L		T
No. 5 Nebraska $	7	–	0	–	0	10	–	1	–	0
No. 6 Missouri	6	–	1	–	0	8	–	2	–	1
Colorado	4	–	2	–	1	6	–	2	–	2
Iowa State	3	–	3	–	1	5	–	4	–	1
Oklahoma	3	–	4	–	0	3	–	7	–	0
Oklahoma State	2	–	5	–	0	3	–	7	–	0
Kansas	2	–	5	–	0	2	–	8	–	0
Kansas State	0	–	7	–	0	0	–	10	–	0
$ – Conference champion; Rankings from AP Poll

The 1965 Oklahoma State Cowboys football team represented Oklahoma State University–Stillwater in the Big Eight Conference during the 1965 NCAA University Division football season. In their third season under head coach Phil Cutchin, the Cowboys compiled a 3–7 record (2–5 against conference opponents), tied for fifth place in the conference, and were outscored by opponents by a combined total of 173 to 131.

On offense, the 1965 team averaged 13.1 points scored, 159.4 rushing yards, and 78.5 passing yards per game. On defense, the team allowed an average of 17.3 points scored, 202.5 rushing yards, and 104.4 passing yards per game. The team's statistical leaders included Walt Garrison with 924 rushing yards, Glenn Baxter with 574 passing yards, Tony Sellari with 226 receiving yards, and placekicker Charles Durkee with 37 points scored.

Running back Walt Garrison and guard Charles Harper were selected as a first-team All-Big Eight Conference player.

The team played its home games at Lewis Field in Stillwater, Oklahoma.

== Schedule ==
Date	Opponent	Site	Result	Attendance	Source
September 18	at No. 6 Arkansas*	War Memorial Stadium; Little Rock, AR	L 14–28	40,115	
September 25	Missouri	Lewis Field; Stillwater, OK	L 0–13	24,000	
October 2	Tulsa*	Lewis Field; Stillwater, OK (rivalry)	W 17–14	27,000	
October 9	at Colorado	Folsom Field; Boulder, CO	L 11–34	21,500	
October 16	at Texas Tech*	Jones Stadium; Lubbock, TX	L 14–17	29,825	
October 23	at Kansas	Memorial Stadium; Lawrence, KS	L 0–9	34,000	
October 30	at Iowa State	Clyde Williams Field; Ames, IA	L 10–14	20,500	
November 13	No. 3 Nebraska^{†}	Lewis Field; Stillwater, OK	L 17–21	31,500	
November 20	Kansas State	Lewis Field; Stillwater, OK	W 31–7	16,000	
December 4	at Oklahoma	Oklahoma Memorial Stadium; Norman, OK (Bedlam Series)	W 17–16	57,250	
*Non-conference game; ^{†}Homecoming; Rankings from AP Poll released prior to the game; Source:

== After the season ==
The 1966 NFL draft was held on November 27, 1965. The following Cowboys were selected.

Round	Pick	Player	Position	NFL club
5	79	Walt Garrison	Running back	Dallas Cowboys
8	113	Charlie Harper	Tackle	New York Giants
