= 1966 Kansas Jayhawks football team =

American college football season

1966 Kansas Jayhawks football
- Conference: Big Eight Conference
- Record: 2–7–1 (0–6–1 Big 8)
- Head coach: Jack Mitchell (9th season)
- Captains: Jerry Barnett; Bill Wohlford
- Home stadium: Memorial Stadium

1966 Big Eight Conference football standings
	Conf.					Overall
Team	W		L		T	W		L		T
No. 6 Nebraska $	6	–	1	–	0	9	–	2	–	0
Colorado	5	–	2	–	0	7	–	3	–	0
Missouri	4	–	2	–	1	6	–	3	–	1
Oklahoma State	4	–	2	–	1	4	–	5	–	1
Oklahoma	4	–	3	–	0	6	–	4	–	0
Iowa State	2	–	3	–	2	2	–	6	–	2
Kansas	0	–	6	–	1	2	–	7	–	1
Kansas State	0	–	6	–	1	0	–	9	–	1
$ – Conference champion; Rankings from AP Poll

The 1966 Kansas Jayhawks football team represented the University of Kansas in the Big Eight Conference during the 1966 NCAA University Division football season. In their ninth and final season under head coach Jack Mitchell, the Jayhawks compiled a 2–7–1 record (0–6–1 against conference opponents), tied for last place in the Big Eight Conference, and were outscored by opponents by a combined total of 188 to 106. They played their home games at Memorial Stadium in Lawrence, Kansas.

The team's statistical leaders included Donnie Shanklin with 732 rushing yards, Halley Kampschroeder with 278 receiving yards and Bob Skahan with 299 passing yards. Jerry Barnett and Bill Wohlford were the team captains.

== Schedule ==
Date	Opponent	Site	Result	Attendance	Source
September 17	Texas Tech*	Memorial Stadium; Lawrence, KS	L 7–23	28,165	
September 24	at Arizona*	Arizona Stadium; Tucson, AZ	W 35–13	33,147	
October 1	at Minnesota*	Memorial Stadium; Minneapolis, MN	W 16–14	43,512	
October 8	at Iowa State	Clyde Williams Field; Ames, IA	L 7–24	22,000	
October 15	Oklahoma	Memorial Stadium; Lawrence, KS	L 0–35	41,500	
October 22	at Oklahoma State	Lewis Field; Stillwater, OK	L 7–10	21,000	
October 29	at Kansas State	Memorial Stadium; Manhattan, KS (rivalry)	T 3–3	19,500	
November 5	No. 6 Nebraska^{†}	Memorial Stadium; Lawrence, KS (rivalry)	L 13–24	45,500	
November 12	Colorado	Memorial Stadium; Lawrence, KS	L 18–35	36,500	
November 19	at Missouri	Memorial Stadium; Columbia, MO (Border War)	L 0–7	53,200	
*Non-conference game; ^{†}Homecoming; Rankings from AP Poll released prior to the game; Source:
