= Jim Mackenzie (American football) =

American football player and coach (1930–1967)

Biographical details
- Born: January 15, 1930; Gary, Indiana, U.S.
- Died: April 28, 1967 (aged 37); Norman, Oklahoma, U.S.

Playing career
- 1949–1951: Kentucky

Coaching career (HC unless noted)
- 1953–1954: Jenkins HS (KY) (assistant)
- 1955–1956: Allen Academy (TX)
- 1957: Missouri (assistant)
- 1958–1965: Arkansas (assistant)
- 1966: Oklahoma

Head coaching record
- Overall: 6–4 (college)

Accomplishments and honors

Awards
- Big Eight Coach of the Year (1966); Second-team All-SEC (1951)

James Alexander Mackenzie (January 15, 1930 – April 28, 1967) was an American football player and coach. He served as the head football coach at the University of Oklahoma for one season in 1966 before his sudden death the following spring.

== Early years ==
A native of Gary, Indiana, Mackenzie played college football at the University of Kentucky for head coach Bear Bryant, and was an assistant coach under Frank Broyles for nine years, one at the University of Missouri and eight at the University of Arkansas.

== Oklahoma ==
After the 1965 season, Mackenzie was hired as the head coach at the University of Oklahoma in December. He succeeded Gomer Jones, a longtime Sooner assistant who had failed to match the success of the legendary Bud Wilkinson, but remained as athletic director. The Sooners' 3–7 record under Jones in 1965 was the worst in program history (until 1996).

In his first season in 1966, Mackenzie led the Sooners to a 6–4 record, defeated rival Texas for the first time in nine years, upset undefeated rival Nebraska on Thanksgiving, and was named the Coach of the Year in the Big Eight Conference.

== Death ==
Entering his second season, Mackenzie died at age 37 of a heart attack in late April. He collapsed at his Norman home after returning from a brief recruiting trip to north Texas during a break in spring practice. He was survived by his wife, Sue Newell, and two children, Katheryn and James, Jr.

Recently departed assistant Homer Rice, the first-year head coach at Cincinnati, turned down the chance to take over for Mackenzie. Assistant coach Chuck Fairbanks, age 33, was promoted to head coach in early May.

== Head coaching record ==
=== College ===
Year	Team	Overall	Conference	Standing
Oklahoma Sooners (Big Eight Conference) (1966)
1966	Oklahoma	6–4	4–3	5th
Oklahoma:		6–4	4–3	
Total:		6–4		
