= 1965 Kansas State Wildcats football team =

American college football season

1965 Kansas State Wildcats football
- Conference: Big Eight Conference
- Record: 0–10 (0–7 Big 8)
- Head coach: Doug Weaver (6th season)
- Home stadium: Memorial Stadium

1965 Big Eight Conference football standings
	Conf.					Overall
Team	W		L		T	W		L		T
No. 5 Nebraska $	7	–	0	–	0	10	–	1	–	0
No. 6 Missouri	6	–	1	–	0	8	–	2	–	1
Colorado	4	–	2	–	1	6	–	2	–	2
Iowa State	3	–	3	–	1	5	–	4	–	1
Oklahoma	3	–	4	–	0	3	–	7	–	0
Oklahoma State	2	–	5	–	0	3	–	7	–	0
Kansas	2	–	5	–	0	2	–	8	–	0
Kansas State	0	–	7	–	0	0	–	10	–	0
$ – Conference champion; Rankings from AP Poll

The 1965 Kansas State Wildcats football team represented Kansas State University in the 1965 NCAA University Division football season. The team's head football coach was Doug Weaver. The Wildcats played their home games in Memorial Stadium. 1965 saw the Wildcats finish with a record of 0–10, and a 0–7 record in Big Eight Conference play. The Wildcats score only 43 points while giving up 296. The finished eight in the Big Eight.

== Schedule ==
Date	Opponent	Site	TV	Result	Attendance	Source
September 18	at Indiana*	Seventeenth Street Football Stadium; Bloomington, IN	NBC	L 7–19	22,883	
September 24	at BYU*	Cougar Stadium; Provo, UT		L 3–21	26,335	
October 2	Colorado	Memorial Stadium; Manhattan, KS (rivalry)		L 0–36	19,000	
October 9	at Missouri	Memorial Stadium; Columbia, MO		L 6–28	49,000	
October 16	No. 2 Nebraska	Memorial Stadium; Manhattan, KS (rivalry)		L 0–41	20,000	
October 23	Oklahoma^{†}	Memorial Stadium; Manhattan, KS		L 0–27	14,000	
October 30	at Kansas	Memorial Stadium; Lawrence, KS (rivalry)		L 0–34	36,900	
November 6	Cincinnati*	Memorial Stadium; Manhattan, KS		L 14–21	11,000	
November 13	at Iowa State	Clyde Williams Field; Ames, IA (rivalry)		L 6–38	13,000	
November 20	at Oklahoma State	Lewis Field; Stillwater, OK		L 7–31	16,000	
*Non-conference game; ^{†}Homecoming; Rankings from AP Poll released prior to the game; Source:
