= 1965 Oklahoma Sooners football team =

American college football season

1965 Oklahoma Sooners football
- Conference: Big Eight Conference
- Record: 3–7 (3–4 Big 8)
- Head coach: Gomer Jones (2nd season)
- Captains: Carl McAdams; Mike Ringer
- Home stadium: Oklahoma Memorial Stadium

1965 Big Eight Conference football standings
	Conf.					Overall
Team	W		L		T	W		L		T
No. 5 Nebraska $	7	–	0	–	0	10	–	1	–	0
No. 6 Missouri	6	–	1	–	0	8	–	2	–	1
Colorado	4	–	2	–	1	6	–	2	–	2
Iowa State	3	–	3	–	1	5	–	4	–	1
Oklahoma	3	–	4	–	0	3	–	7	–	0
Oklahoma State	2	–	5	–	0	3	–	7	–	0
Kansas	2	–	5	–	0	2	–	8	–	0
Kansas State	0	–	7	–	0	0	–	10	–	0
$ – Conference champion; Rankings from AP Poll

The 1965 Oklahoma Sooners football team represented the University of Oklahoma during the 1965 NCAA University Division football season. Led by second-year head coach Gomer Jones, they played their home games at Oklahoma Memorial Stadium and competed as members of the Big Eight Conference.

A longtime assistant under Bud Wilkinson, Jones resigned after the 3–7 season, one of the worst in program history, but remained at OU as athletic director.

Jim Mackenzie, an assistant at Arkansas under Frank Broyles, was hired as head coach in December.

== Schedule ==
Date	Opponent	Site	TV	Result	Attendance	Source
September 25	at Pittsburgh*	Pitt Stadium; Pittsburgh, PA		L 9–13	24,452	
October 2	Navy*	Oklahoma Memorial Stadium; Norman, OK		L 0–10	57,000	
October 9	vs. No. 1 Texas*	Cotton Bowl; Dallas, TX (Red River Shootout)		L 0–19	75,342	
October 16	Kansas	Oklahoma Memorial Stadium; Norman, OK		W 21–7	45,000	
October 23	at Kansas State	Memorial Stadium; Manhattan, KS		W 27–0	14,000	
October 30	Colorado	Oklahoma Memorial Stadium; Norman, OK		L 0–13	45,000	
November 6	Iowa State	Oklahoma Memorial Stadium; Norman, OK		W 24–20	45,000	
November 13	at No. 9 Missouri	Memorial Stadium; Columbia, MO (rivalry)		L 0–30	51,014	
November 25	at No. 3 Nebraska	Memorial Stadium; Lincoln, NE (rivalry)	CBS	L 9–21	52,865	
December 4	Oklahoma State	Oklahoma Memorial Stadium; Norman, OK (Bedlam Series)		L 16–17	57,250	
*Non-conference game; Rankings from AP Poll released prior to the game; Source:

== NFL draft ==
The following players were drafted by National Football League teams on November 27, 1965.

Round	Pick	Player	Position	NFL team
1	8	Carl McAdams	Linebacker	St. Louis Cardinals
10	149	Mike Ringer	Running back	St. Louis Cardinals
