= 1966 Colorado Buffaloes football team =

American college football season

1966 Colorado Buffaloes football
- Conference: Big Eight Conference
- Record: 7–3 (5–2 Big 8)
- Head coach: Eddie Crowder (4th season)
- MVP: Bill Fairband
- Captains: John Beard; Hale Irwin
- Home stadium: Folsom Field

1966 Big Eight Conference football standings
	Conf.					Overall
Team	W		L		T	W		L		T
No. 6 Nebraska $	6	–	1	–	0	9	–	2	–	0
Colorado	5	–	2	–	0	7	–	3	–	0
Missouri	4	–	2	–	1	6	–	3	–	1
Oklahoma State	4	–	2	–	1	4	–	5	–	1
Oklahoma	4	–	3	–	0	6	–	4	–	0
Iowa State	2	–	3	–	2	2	–	6	–	2
Kansas	0	–	6	–	1	2	–	7	–	1
Kansas State	0	–	6	–	1	0	–	9	–	1
$ – Conference champion; Rankings from AP Poll

The 1966 Colorado Buffaloes football team was an American football team that represented the University of Colorado as a member of the Big Eight Conference during the 1966 NCAA University Division football season. Led by fourth-year head coach Eddie Crowder, the Buffaloes compiled an overall record of 7–3 with a mark of 5–2 in conference play, runner-up in the Big 8. Colorado played home games on campus at Folsom Field in Boulder, Colorado.

The starting safeties were Dick Anderson and Hale Irwin, both from Boulder High School. Irwin was first-team all-conference, Anderson was honorable mention.

== Schedule ==
Date	Opponent	Site	Result	Attendance	Source
September 17	Miami (FL)*	Folsom Field; Boulder, CO	L 3–24	39,000	
September 24	at No. 10 Baylor*	Baylor Stadium; Waco, TX	W 13–7	29,000	
October 1	Kansas State	Folsom Field; Boulder, CO (rivalry)	W 10–0	35,000	
October 8	at Oklahoma State	Lewis Field; Stillwater, OK	L 10–11	27,000	
October 15	at Iowa State	Clyde Williams Field; Ames, IA	W 41–21	24,000	
October 22	No. 7 Nebraska^{†}	Folsom Field; Boulder, CO (rivalry)	L 19–21	46,112	
October 29	Oklahoma	Folsom Field; Boulder, CO	W 24–21	36,200	
November 5	at Missouri	Memorial Stadium; Columbia, MO	W 26–0	56,500	
November 12	at Kansas	Memorial Stadium; Lawrence, KS	W 35–18	36,500	
November 19	Air Force*	Folsom Field; Boulder, CO	W 10–9	39,876	
*Non-conference game; ^{†}Homecoming; Rankings from AP Poll released prior to the game; Source:
