= 1965 Kansas Jayhawks football team =

American college football season

1965 Kansas Jayhawks football
- Conference: Big Eight Conference
- Record: 2–8 (2–5 Big 8)
- Head coach: Jack Mitchell (8th season)
- Captains: Greg Roth; Mike Shinn
- Home stadium: Memorial Stadium

1965 Big Eight Conference football standings
	Conf.					Overall
Team	W		L		T	W		L		T
No. 5 Nebraska $	7	–	0	–	0	10	–	1	–	0
No. 6 Missouri	6	–	1	–	0	8	–	2	–	1
Colorado	4	–	2	–	1	6	–	2	–	2
Iowa State	3	–	3	–	1	5	–	4	–	1
Oklahoma	3	–	4	–	0	3	–	7	–	0
Oklahoma State	2	–	5	–	0	3	–	7	–	0
Kansas	2	–	5	–	0	2	–	8	–	0
Kansas State	0	–	7	–	0	0	–	10	–	0
$ – Conference champion; Rankings from AP Poll

The 1965 Kansas Jayhawks football team represented the University of Kansas in the Big Eight Conference during the 1965 NCAA University Division football season. In their eighth season under head coach Jack Mitchell, the Jayhawks compiled a 2–8 record (2–5 against conference opponents), tied for sixth in the Big Eight Conference, and were outscored by opponents by a combined total of 215 to 119. They played their home games at Memorial Stadium in Lawrence, Kansas.

The team's statistical leaders included Dan Miller with 356 rushing yards, Sims Stokes with 271 receiving yards and Bill Fenton with 500 passing yards. Greg Roth and Mike Shinn were the team captains.

== Schedule ==
Date	Opponent	Site	Result	Attendance	Source
September 18	at Texas Tech*	Jones Stadium; Lubbock, TX	L 7–26	35,300	
September 25	Arizona*	Memorial Stadium; Lawrence, KS	L 15–23	35,500	
October 2	at California*	California Memorial Stadium; Berkeley, CA	L 0–17	32,000	
October 9	Iowa State	Memorial Stadium; Lawrence, KS	L 7–21	38,500	
October 16	at Oklahoma	Oklahoma Memorial Stadium; Norman, OK	L 7–21	45,000	
October 23	Oklahoma State	Memorial Stadium; Lawrence, KS	W 9–0	34,000	
October 30	Kansas State	Memorial Stadium; Lawrence, KS (rivalry)	W 34–0	36,900	
November 6	at No. 3 Nebraska	Memorial Stadium; Lincoln, NE (rivalry)	L 6–42	53,910	
November 13	at Colorado	Folsom Field; Boulder, CO	L 14–21	21,200	
November 20	No. 8 Missouri	Memorial Stadium; Lawrence, KS (Border War)	L 20–44	44,000	
*Non-conference game; Rankings from AP Poll released prior to the game; Source:
