= 1965 TCU Horned Frogs football team =

American college football season

1965 TCU Horned Frogs football

Sun Bowl, L 12–13 vs. Texas Western
- Conference: Southwest Conference
- Record: 6–5 (5–2 SWC)
- Head coach: Abe Martin (13th season)
- Offensive scheme: Meyer spread
- Home stadium: Amon G. Carter Stadium

1965 Southwest Conference football standings
	Conf.					Overall
Team	W		L		T	W		L		T
No. 3 Arkansas $	7	–	0	–	0	10	–	1	–	0
Texas Tech	5	–	2	–	0	8	–	3	–	0
TCU	5	–	2	–	0	6	–	5	–	0
Texas	3	–	4	–	0	6	–	4	–	0
Baylor	3	–	4	–	0	5	–	5	–	0
SMU	3	–	4	–	0	4	–	5	–	1
Texas A&M	1	–	6	–	0	3	–	7	–	0
Rice	1	–	6	–	0	2	–	8	–	0
$ – Conference champion; Rankings from AP Poll

The 1965 TCU Horned Frogs football team represented Texas Christian University (TCU) in the 1965 NCAA University Division football season. The Horned Frogs finished the season 6–5 overall and 5–2 in the Southwest Conference. The team was coached by Abe Martin in his 13th year as head coach. The Frogs played their home games in Amon G. Carter Stadium, which is located on campus in Fort Worth, Texas. They were invited to the Sun Bowl where they lost to Texas Western by a score of 13–12.

== Schedule ==
Date	Opponent	Site	Result	Attendance	Source
September 18	at No. 1 Nebraska*	Memorial Stadium; Lincoln, NE	L 14–34	53,650	
September 25	Florida State*	Amon G. Carter Stadium; Fort Worth, TX	W 7–3	18,506	
October 2	at No. 4 Arkansas	War Memorial Stadium; Little Rock, AR	L 0–28	47,000	
October 9	at Texas Tech	Jones Stadium; Lubbock, TX (rivalry)	L 24–28	35,000	
October 16	Texas A&M	Amon G. Carter Stadium; Fort Worth, TX (rivalry)	W 17–9	35,096	
October 23	at Clemson*	Memorial Stadium; Clemson, SC	L 0–3	33,000	
October 30	at Baylor	Baylor Stadium; Waco, TX (rivalry)	W 10–7	32,000	
November 13	at Texas	Memorial Stadium; Austin, TX (rivalry)	W 25–10	51,500	
November 20	Rice	Amon G. Carter Stadium; Fort Worth, TX	W 42–14	16,606	
November 27	SMU	Amon G. Carter Stadium; Fort Worth, TX (rivalry)	W 10–7	19,350	
December 31	vs. Texas Western	Sun Bowl; El Paso, TX (Sun Bowl)	L 12–13	27,450	
*Non-conference game; Rankings from AP Poll released prior to the game
