= 1965 Colorado Buffaloes football team =

American college football season

1965 Colorado Buffaloes football
- Conference: Big Eight Conference

Ranking
- Coaches: No. 20
- Record: 6–2–2 (4–2–1 Big 8)
- Head coach: Eddie Crowder (3rd season)
- MVPs: Steve Sidwell; Frank Rogers
- Captains: Larry Ferraro; Steve Sidwell; Frank Van Valkenburg
- Home stadium: Folsom Field

1965 Big Eight Conference football standings
	Conf.					Overall
Team	W		L		T	W		L		T
No. 5 Nebraska $	7	–	0	–	0	10	–	1	–	0
No. 6 Missouri	6	–	1	–	0	8	–	2	–	1
Colorado	4	–	2	–	1	6	–	2	–	2
Iowa State	3	–	3	–	1	5	–	4	–	1
Oklahoma	3	–	4	–	0	3	–	7	–	0
Oklahoma State	2	–	5	–	0	3	–	7	–	0
Kansas	2	–	5	–	0	2	–	8	–	0
Kansas State	0	–	7	–	0	0	–	10	–	0
$ – Conference champion; Rankings from AP Poll

The 1965 Colorado Buffaloes football team was an American football team that represented the University of Colorado as a member of the Big Eight Conference during the 1965 NCAA University Division football season. Led by third-year head coach Eddie Crowder, the Buffaloes compiled an overall record of 6–2–2 with a mark of 4–2–1 in conference play, placing third in the Big 8. Colorado played home games on campus at Folsom Field in Boulder, Colorado.

This was Colorado's first winning season in four years, following three consecutive 2–8 records; they beat Oklahoma for the first time under Crowder, who was previously a Sooner assistant (and player).

== Schedule ==
Date	Opponent	Site	Result	Attendance	Source
September 18	at Wisconsin*	Camp Randall Stadium; Madison, WI	T 0–0	45,914	
September 25	Fresno State*	Folsom Field; Boulder, CO	W 10–7	29,000	
October 2	at Kansas State	Memorial Stadium; Manhattan, KS (rivalry)	W 36–0	19,000	
October 9	Oklahoma State	Folsom Field; Boulder, CO	W 34–11	21,500	
October 16	Iowa State^{†}	Folsom Field; Boulder, CO	T 10–10	25,500	
October 23	at No. 3 Nebraska	Memorial Stadium; Lincoln, NE (rivalry)	L 13–38	54,110	
October 30	at Oklahoma	Oklahoma Memorial Stadium; Norman, OK	W 13–0	45,000	
November 6	No. 9 Missouri	Folsom Field; Boulder, CO	L 7–20	32,500	
November 13	Kansas	Folsom Field; Boulder, CO	W 21–14	21,200	
November 20	at Air Force*	Falcon Stadium; Colorado Springs, CO	W 19–6	38,235	
*Non-conference game; ^{†}Homecoming; Rankings from AP Poll released prior to the game; Source:
