= 1965 Baylor Bears football team =

American college football season

1965 Baylor Bears football
- Conference: Southwest Conference
- Record: 5–5 (3–4 SWC)
- Head coach: John Bridgers (7th season)
- Captains: Mike V. Bourland; Bill Ferguson
- Home stadium: Baylor Stadium

1965 Southwest Conference football standings
	Conf.					Overall
Team	W		L		T	W		L		T
No. 3 Arkansas $	7	–	0	–	0	10	–	1	–	0
Texas Tech	5	–	2	–	0	8	–	3	–	0
TCU	5	–	2	–	0	6	–	5	–	0
Texas	3	–	4	–	0	6	–	4	–	0
Baylor	3	–	4	–	0	5	–	5	–	0
SMU	3	–	4	–	0	4	–	5	–	1
Texas A&M	1	–	6	–	0	3	–	7	–	0
Rice	1	–	6	–	0	2	–	8	–	0
$ – Conference champion; Rankings from AP Poll

The 1965 Baylor Bears football team represented Baylor University in the Southwest Conference (SWC) during the 1965 NCAA University Division football season. In their seventh season under head coach John Bridgers, the Bears compiled a 5–5 record (3–4 against conference opponents), tied for fourth place in the conference, and were outscored by opponents by a combined total of 171 to 156. They played their home games at Baylor Stadium in Waco, Texas.

The team's statistical leaders included Ken Stockdale with 978 passing yards, Richard Defee with 429 rushing yards, Harlan Lane with 643 receiving yards, and Billy Hayes and George Cheshire with 24 points scored each. Mike V. Bourland and Bill Ferguson were the team captains.

== Schedule ==
Date	Opponent	Site	Result	Attendance	Source
September 18	at Auburn*	Cliff Hare Stadium; Auburn, AL	W 14–8	25,000	
September 25	Washington*	Baylor Stadium; Waco, TX	W 17–14	22,000	
October 2	at Florida State*	Doak Campbell Stadium; Tallahassee, FL	L 7–9	28,900	
October 9	No. 3 Arkansas	Baylor Stadium; Waco, TX	L 7–38	33,246	
October 23	at Texas A&M	Kyle Field; College Station, TX (rivalry)	W 31–0	26,000	
October 30	TCU^{†}	Baylor Stadium; Waco, TX (rivalry)	L 7–10	32,000	
November 6	at Texas	Memorial Stadium; Austin, TX (rivalry)	L 14–35	57,500	
November 13	at Texas Tech	Jones Stadium; Lubbock, TX (rivalry)	L 22–34	45,619	
November 20	SMU	Baylor Stadium; Waco, TX	W 20–10	20,000	
November 27	at Rice	Rice Stadium; Houston, TX	W 17–13	20,000	
*Non-conference game; ^{†}Homecoming; Rankings from AP Poll released prior to the game
