= 1965 Texas Longhorns football team =

American college football season

1965 Texas Longhorns football
- Conference: Southwest Conference
- Record: 6–4 (3–4 SWC)
- Head coach: Darrell Royal (9th season)
- Home stadium: Memorial Stadium

1965 Southwest Conference football standings
	Conf.					Overall
Team	W		L		T	W		L		T
No. 3 Arkansas $	7	–	0	–	0	10	–	1	–	0
Texas Tech	5	–	2	–	0	8	–	3	–	0
TCU	5	–	2	–	0	6	–	5	–	0
Texas	3	–	4	–	0	6	–	4	–	0
Baylor	3	–	4	–	0	5	–	5	–	0
SMU	3	–	4	–	0	4	–	5	–	1
Texas A&M	1	–	6	–	0	3	–	7	–	0
Rice	1	–	6	–	0	2	–	8	–	0
$ – Conference champion; Rankings from AP Poll

The 1965 Texas Longhorns football team was an American football team that represented the University of Texas (now known as the University of Texas at Austin) as a member of the Southwest Conference (SWC) during the 1965 NCAA University Division football season. In their ninth year under head coach Darrell Royal, the Longhorns compiled an overall record of 6–4, with a mark of 3–4 in conference play, and finished tied for fourth in the SWC.

Tommy Nobis was in his final year at Texas and was known as an "iron man", playing (and starting) on both defense and offense for his entire college career. Aside from being an All-American linebacker, he also played guard on the offensive side of the ball and was often the primary blocker on touchdown runs. Famed Texas coach Darrell K Royal called him "the finest two-way player I have ever seen." A knee injury slowed him during the latter part of his senior season, but he still was able to perform at a high level and won a number of major individual awards including the Knute Rockne Award, best lineman, the Outland Trophy, best interior lineman, and the Maxwell Award for college football's best player. Nobis also finished seventh in the Heisman voting to USC's Mike Garrett. He appeared on the covers of LIFE, Sports Illustrated and TIME magazines.

== Schedule ==
The season opener against Tulane was originally scheduled to be played in New Orleans, but was switched to Austin because of significant destruction caused by Hurricane Betsy.

Date	Time	Opponent	Rank	Site	TV	Result	Attendance	Source
September 18	8:00 p.m.	Tulane*	No. 2	Memorial Stadium; Austin, TX		W 31–0	40,000	
September 25	7:30 p.m.	Texas Tech	No. 3	Memorial Stadium; Austin, TX (rivalry)		W 33–7	65,310	
October 2	7:30 p.m.	Indiana*	No. 1	Memorial Stadium; Austin, TX		W 27–12	57,000	
October 9	2:00 p.m.	vs. Oklahoma*	No. 1	Cotton Bowl; Dallas, TX (rivalry)		W 19–0	75,504	
October 16	2:30 p.m.	at No. 3 Arkansas	No. 1	Razorback Stadium; Fayetteville, AR (rivalry)	NBC	L 24–27	39,510–42,000	
October 23	7:00 p.m.	Rice	No. 5	Memorial Stadium; Austin, TX (rivalry)		L 17–20	63,000	
October 30	2:00 p.m.	at SMU	No. 9	Cotton Bowl; Dallas, TX		L 14–31	48,000	
November 6	1:30 p.m.	Baylor		Memorial Stadium; Austin, TX (rivalry)	NBC	W 35–14	57,500	
November 13	2:00 p.m.	TCU		Memorial Stadium; Austin, TX (rivalry)		L 10–25	51,500	
November 25	1:00 p.m.	at Texas A&M		Kyle Field; College Station, TX (rivalry)		W 21–17	40,000	
*Non-conference game; Rankings from AP Poll released prior to the game; All times are in Central time

== Game summaries ==
=== Oklahoma ===
Team	1	2	3	4	Total
Oklahoma	0	0	0	0	0
• Texas	0	9	0	10	19

- Date: October 9
- Location: Cotton Bowl, Dallas, Texas
- Game attendance: 75,504

Scoring summary
2	TEX	David Conway 22 yard field goal	TEX 3-0
2	TEX	Marvin Kristynik 1 yard run (kick failed)	TEX 9-0
4	TEX	David Conway 35 yard field goal	TEX 12-0
4	TEX	Kelly Baker 11 yard pass from Regg Lott (David Conway kick)	TEX 19-0

Texas' eight straight win in the Red River series.

== Awards and honors ==
- Tommy Nobis, Maxwell Award
- Tommy Nobis, Outland Trophy
- Tommy Nobis, Consensus All-American

== 1965 team players in the NFL ==
The following players were drafted into professional football following the season.

Player	Position	Round	Pick	Franchise
Tommy Nobis	Linebacker	1	1	Atlanta Falcons
Diron Talbert	Defensive tackle	5	66	Los Angeles Rams
Phil Harris	Back	7	104	New York Giants
Pete Lammons	End	14	213	Cleveland Browns

- Tommy Nobis was also drafted by the Houston Oilers in the first round of the 1966 American Football League draft.
