= 1965 SMU Mustangs football team =

American college football season

1965 SMU Mustangs football
- Conference: Southwest Conference
- Record: 4–5–1 (3–4 SWC)
- Head coach: Hayden Fry (4th season)
- Home stadium: Cotton Bowl

1965 Southwest Conference football standings
	Conf.					Overall
Team	W		L		T	W		L		T
No. 3 Arkansas $	7	–	0	–	0	10	–	1	–	0
Texas Tech	5	–	2	–	0	8	–	3	–	0
TCU	5	–	2	–	0	6	–	5	–	0
Texas	3	–	4	–	0	6	–	4	–	0
Baylor	3	–	4	–	0	5	–	5	–	0
SMU	3	–	4	–	0	4	–	5	–	1
Texas A&M	1	–	6	–	0	3	–	7	–	0
Rice	1	–	6	–	0	2	–	8	–	0
$ – Conference champion; Rankings from AP Poll

The 1965 SMU Mustangs football team represented Southern Methodist University (SMU) as a member of the Southwest Conference (SWC) during the 1965 NCAA University Division football season. Led by fourth-year head coach Hayden Fry, the Mustangs compiled an overall record of 4–5–1 with a conference mark of 3–4, tying for fourth place in the SWC.

== Schedule ==
Date	Opponent	Site	Result	Attendance	Source
September 18	at Miami (FL)*	Miami Orange Bowl; Miami, FL	W 7–3	46,494	
September 25	at Illinois*	Memorial Stadium; Champaign, IL	L 0–42	45,715	
October 2	No. 2 Purdue*	Cotton Bowl; Dallas, TX	T 14–14	17,000	
October 16	at Rice	Rice Stadium; Houston, TX (rivalry)	W 17–14	30,000	
October 23	Texas Tech	Cotton Bowl; Dallas, TX	L 24–26	40,000	
October 30	No. 9 Texas	Cotton Bowl; Dallas, TX	W 31–14	40,000	
November 6	at Texas A&M	Kyle Field; College Station, TX	W 10–0	19,000	
November 13	No. 2 Arkansas	Cotton Bowl; Dallas, TX	L 3–24	67,000	
November 20	at Baylor	Baylor Stadium; Waco, TX	L 10–20	20,000	
November 27	at TCU	Amon G. Carter Stadium; Fort Worth, TX (rivalry)	L 7–10	19,350	
*Non-conference game; Rankings from AP Poll released prior to the game
