= 1966 Missouri Tigers football team =

American college football season

1966 Missouri Tigers football
- Conference: Big Eight Conference
- Record: 6–3–1 (4–2–1 Big 8)
- Head coach: Dan Devine (9th season)
- Home stadium: Memorial Stadium

1966 Big Eight Conference football standings
	Conf.					Overall
Team	W		L		T	W		L		T
No. 6 Nebraska $	6	–	1	–	0	9	–	2	–	0
Colorado	5	–	2	–	0	7	–	3	–	0
Missouri	4	–	2	–	1	6	–	3	–	1
Oklahoma State	4	–	2	–	1	4	–	5	–	1
Oklahoma	4	–	3	–	0	6	–	4	–	0
Iowa State	2	–	3	–	2	2	–	6	–	2
Kansas	0	–	6	–	1	2	–	7	–	1
Kansas State	0	–	6	–	1	0	–	9	–	1
$ – Conference champion; Rankings from AP Poll

The 1966 Missouri Tigers football team was an American football team that represented the University of Missouri in the Big Eight Conference (Big 8) during the 1966 NCAA University Division football season. The team compiled a 6–3–1 record (4–2–1 against Big 8 opponents), finished in a tie for third place in the Big 8, and outscored opponents by a combined total of 121 to 116. Dan Devine was the head coach for the ninth of 13 seasons. The team played its home games at Memorial Stadium in Columbia, Missouri.

The team's statistical leaders included Charlie Brown with 576 rushing yards, Gary Kombrink with 433 passing yards and 645 yards of total offense, Chuck Weber with 157 receiving yards, and Bill Bates with 27 points scored.

== Schedule ==
Date	Opponent	Site	Result	Attendance	Source
September 17	Minnesota*	Memorial Stadium; Columbia, MO	W 24–0	48,500	
September 24	at Illinois*	Memorial Stadium; Champaign, IL (rivalry)	W 21–14	55,378	
October 1	at No. 2 UCLA*	Los Angeles Memorial Coliseum; Los Angeles, CA	L 15–24	32,649	
October 8	at Kansas State	Memorial Stadium; Manhattan, KS	W 27–0	15,800	
October 15	Oklahoma State	Memorial Stadium; Columbia, MO	W 7–0	54,000	
October 22	Iowa State	Memorial Stadium; Columbia, MO (rivalry)	T 10–10	47,000	
October 29	at No. 8 Nebraska	Memorial Stadium; Lincoln, NE (rivalry)	L 0–35	65,095	
November 5	Colorado	Memorial Stadium; Columbia, MO	L 0–26	56,500	
November 12	at Oklahoma	Oklahoma Memorial Stadium; Norman, OK (rivalry)	W 10–7	57,650	
November 19	Kansas	Memorial Stadium; Columbia, MO	W 7–0	53,200	
*Non-conference game; Rankings from AP Poll released prior to the game; Source:

== Game summaries ==
=== Kansas ===
The 75th meeting between the two rivals was a defensive struggle that was finally broken in the third quarter. On third-and-seven from their own 46, Earl Denny caught a pass from Gary Kombrink in stride at the Kansas 38 and went in to score.
