= 1965 Rice Owls football team =

American college football season

1965 Rice Owls football
- Conference: Southwest Conference
- Record: 2–8 (1–6 SWC)
- Head coach: Jess Neely (26th season)
- Home stadium: Rice Stadium

1965 Southwest Conference football standings
	Conf.					Overall
Team	W		L		T	W		L		T
No. 3 Arkansas $	7	–	0	–	0	10	–	1	–	0
Texas Tech	5	–	2	–	0	8	–	3	–	0
TCU	5	–	2	–	0	6	–	5	–	0
Texas	3	–	4	–	0	6	–	4	–	0
Baylor	3	–	4	–	0	5	–	5	–	0
SMU	3	–	4	–	0	4	–	5	–	1
Texas A&M	1	–	6	–	0	3	–	7	–	0
Rice	1	–	6	–	0	2	–	8	–	0
$ – Conference champion; Rankings from AP Poll

The 1965 Rice Owls football team represented Rice University during the 1965 NCAA University Division football season. In its 26th season under head coach Jess Neely, the team compiled a 2–8 record, tied for last place in the conference, and was outscored by a total of 248 to 123. The team played its home games at Rice Stadium in Houston.

The team's statistical leaders included David Ferguson with 584 passing yards, Lester Lehman with 422 rushing yards, Murphy Davis with 360 receiving yards, and Chuck Latourette with 30 points scored. Tackle Jim Vining was selected by the Associated Press (AP) as a first-team player on the 1965 All-Southwest Conference football team.

== Schedule ==
Date	Opponent	Site	Result	Attendance	Source
September 18	Louisiana Tech*	Rice Stadium; Houston, TX	W 14–0	22,000	
September 25	at No. 7 LSU*	Tiger Stadium; Baton Rouge, LA	L 14–42	67,500	
October 2	Duke*	Rice Stadium; Houston, TX	L 21–41	22,000	
October 16	SMU	Rice Stadium; Houston, TX (rivalry)	L 14–17	30,000	
October 23	at No. 5 Texas	Memorial Stadium; Austin, TX (rivalry)	W 20–17	63,000	
October 30	at Texas Tech	Jones Stadium; Lubbock, TX	L 0–27	43,555	
November 6	No. 2 Arkansas	Rice Stadium; Houston, TX	L 0–31	46,000	
November 13	Texas A&M	Rice Stadium; Houston, TX	L 13–14	45,000	
November 20	at TCU	Amon G. Carter Stadium; Fort Worth, TX	L 14–42	16,606	
November 27	Baylor	Rice Stadium; Houston, TX	L 13–17	20,000	
*Non-conference game; Rankings from AP Poll released prior to the game
