= Abe Martin (Texas coach) =

American football player, coach, and administrator (1908–1979)

Biographical details
- Born: October 18, 1908; Jacksboro, Texas, U.S.
- Died: January 11, 1979 (aged 70); Fort Worth, Texas, U.S.

Playing career
- 1928–1930: TCU

Coaching career (HC unless noted)
- 1932–1935: El Paso HS (TX)
- 1936–1942: Lufkin HS (TX)
- 1944: Paschal HS (TX)
- 1945–1952: TCU (assistant)
- 1953–1966: TCU

Administrative career (AD unless noted)
- 1963–1975: TCU

Head coaching record
- Overall: 74–64–7 (college)
- Bowls: 1–3–1

Accomplishments and honors

Championships
- 3 SWC (1955, 1958–1959)

Awards
- Amos Alonzo Stagg Award (1968)

Othol Hershel Martin (October 18, 1908 – January 11, 1979), also known as Abe Martin, was an American football player, coach, and college athletics administrator. He served as the head coach at Texas Christian University (TCU) from 1953 to 1966, compiling a record of 74–64–7. Martin was also the athletic director at Texas Christian from 1963 to 1975.

== Early life ==
Born in Jacksboro, Texas, Martin attended Jacksboro High School and then Texas Christian University in Fort Worth, where he played football under head coach Francis Schmidt. He was part of TCU's first-ever Southwest Conference championship team in 1929. Schmidt gave Martin his nickname after he related his style to that of a newspaper column of the day named "Abe Martin Says". He set conference records for blocking punts and recovering fumbles at TCU.

== Coaching career ==
After graduating from TCU in 1932, Martin began his coaching career at El Paso High School in 1934, where he won two district championships. In 1936, he moved across the state to coach at Lufkin High School, where he compiled a record of 66–10, with four district championships. He left coaching in 1943, but returned in 1944 to coach at Paschal High School in Fort Worth.

In 1945, he returned to TCU to coach football, and in 1953 was finally elevated to the head coaching position upon the retirement of Dutch Meyer. From 1953 to 1966, he coached the Horned Frogs to a 74–64–7 record, during which they appeared in the Cotton Bowl Classic three times, as well as the Sun Bowl and Bluebonnet Bowl once each. He coached seven All-Americans at TCU, including Jim Swink and Bob Lilly.

After his 1961 team upset a previously undefeated Texas, Longhorns coach Darrell Royal famously described the Frogs as "cockroaches". Martin's casual response was that he had "never received so much criticism for winning a game".

After a disappointing 2–8 season in 1966, he resigned as head football coach. He remained the school's athletic director, a post he assumed in 1963 and held until 1975. In 1972, he was elected to the Texas Sports Hall of Fame in Waco.

== Legacy ==
Abe Martin Stadium in Lufkin, Texas, is named for Martin.

== Head coaching record ==
=== College ===
Year	Team	Overall	Conference	Standing	Bowl/playoffs	Coaches^{#}	AP^{°}
TCU Horned Frogs (Southwest Conference) (1953–1966)
1953	TCU	3–7	1–5	T–6th			
1954	TCU	4–6	1–5	6th			
1955	TCU	9–2	5–1	1st	L Cotton	6	6
1956	TCU	8–3	5–1	2nd	W Cotton	14	14
1957	TCU	5–4–1	2–4	T–5th			
1958	TCU	8–2–1	5–1	1st	T Cotton	9	10
1959	TCU	8–3	5–1	T–1st	L Bluebonnet	8	7
1960	TCU	4–4–2	3–3–1	5th			
1961	TCU	3–5–2	2–4–1	5th			
1962	TCU	6–4	5–2	3rd			
1963	TCU	4–5–1	2–4–1	5th			
1964	TCU	4–6	3–4	6th			
1965	TCU	6–5	5–2	T–2nd	L Sun		
1966	TCU	2–8	2–5	T–6th			
TCU:		74–64–7	46–42–3				
Total:		74–64–7					
National championship Conference title Conference division title or championship game berth
^{#}Rankings from final Coaches Poll.; ^{°}Rankings from final AP Poll.
