= 1966 Kansas State Wildcats football team =

American college football season

1966 Kansas State Wildcats football
- Conference: Big Eight Conference
- Record: 0–9–1 (0–6–1 Big 8)
- Head coach: Doug Weaver (7th season)
- Home stadium: Memorial Stadium

1966 Big Eight Conference football standings
	Conf.					Overall
Team	W		L		T	W		L		T
No. 6 Nebraska $	6	–	1	–	0	9	–	2	–	0
Colorado	5	–	2	–	0	7	–	3	–	0
Missouri	4	–	2	–	1	6	–	3	–	1
Oklahoma State	4	–	2	–	1	4	–	5	–	1
Oklahoma	4	–	3	–	0	6	–	4	–	0
Iowa State	2	–	3	–	2	2	–	6	–	2
Kansas	0	–	6	–	1	2	–	7	–	1
Kansas State	0	–	6	–	1	0	–	9	–	1
$ – Conference champion; Rankings from AP Poll

The 1966 Kansas State Wildcats football team represented Kansas State University as a member of the Big Eight Conference during the 1966 NCAA University Division football season. Led by Doug Weaver in his seventh and final season as head coach, the Wildcats compiled an overall record of 0–9–1 with a mark of 0–6–1 in conference play, tying for seventh place in the Big 8. Kansas State scored 66 points and allowed 226 on the season. The team played home games at Memorial Stadium in Manhattan, Kansas.

== Schedule ==
Date	Opponent	Site	Result	Attendance	Source
September 17	at Army*	Michie Stadium; West Point, NY	L 6–21	21,000	
September 24	New Mexico*	Memorial Stadium; Manhattan, KS	L 8–28	15,300	
October 1	at Colorado	Folsom Field; Boulder, CO (rivalry)	L 0–10	35,000	
October 8	Missouri	Memorial Stadium; Manhattan, KS	L 0–27	15,800	
October 15	at No. 6 Nebraska	Memorial Stadium; Lincoln, NE (rivalry)	L 10–21	64,108	
October 22	at Cincinnati*	Nippert Stadium; Cincinnati, OH	L 14–28	13,200	
October 29	Kansas^{†}	Memorial Stadium; Manhattan, KS (rivalry)	T 3–3	19,500	
November 5	at Oklahoma	Oklahoma Memorial Stadium; Norman, OK	L 6–37	43,900	
November 12	Iowa State	Memorial Stadium; Manhattan, KS (rivalry)	L 13–30	9,500	
November 19	Oklahoma State	Memorial Stadium; Manhattan, KS	L 6–21	9,300	
*Non-conference game; ^{†}Homecoming; Rankings from AP Poll released prior to the game; Source:
