= 1965 Sun Bowl =

American college football game

TCU Horned Frogs	Texas Western Miners
(6–4)	(7–3)
SWC	Independent
12	13
Head coach: Abe Martin	Head coach: Bobby Dobbs
	1	2	3	4	Total
TCU	0	10	0	2	12
Texas Western	0	0	10	3	13
- Date: December 31, 1965
- Season: 1965
- Stadium: Sun Bowl
- Location: El Paso, Texas
- MVP: QB Billy Stevens
- Referee: Joe Miller (WAC; split crew: WAC, SWC)
- Attendance: 27,450

The 1965 Sun Bowl was a college football postseason bowl game between the TCU Horned Frogs and the Texas Western Miners.

== Background ==
TCU tied for second in the Southwestern Conference, in the penultimate season for Coach Abe Martin, and first bowl game since 1959. Dobbs was in his first season with the independent Texas Western team, in their first bowl game since 1957. This was their seventh appearance in the Sun Bowl.

== Game summary ==
TCU dominated the first half with 48 rushing plays to Texas Western's 20, which led to a 10–0 halftime lead. In the first period, Bruce Alford's field goal attempt from the 28 fell short. However, in the second quarter, Kent Nix threw an 11-yard touchdown pass to David Smith, and added in a field goal by Alford later in the second quarter. In the third quarter, the Miners came to life. Billy Stevens shot a 34-yard touchdown pass to Chuck Hughes, narrowing the lead to three. Later in the period, they drove 70 yards for a 21-yard field goal, tying the game at 10. In the fourth quarter, the Miners scored early on an 18-yard field goal, to take the lead at 13–10 after recovering a fumble at the 29. TCU scored with 43 seconds left after sacking Stevens in the end zone, to make it 13–12. The Frogs were given the ball back after the Safety, but they only managed to advance 8 yards, falling just short.

== Aftermath ==
The Miners would return to the Sun Bowl two years later and win (by then, Texas Western had become UTEP). They have not won a Sun Bowl, or any bowl (as of 2020) since. The Horned Frogs would not return to the Sun Bowl until 1998, which they won to break their 37-year drought.

== Statistics ==
Statistics	TCU	TWC
First downs	18	14
Yards rushing	100	12
Yards passing	157	202
Return yards	42	72
Total yards	299	286
Punts-Average	4-48.5	5-39.0
Fumbles-Lost	4-3	2-0
Interceptions	3	3
Penalties-Yards	5-35	3-45
