= 1965 Texas Tech Red Raiders football team =

American college football season

1965 Texas Tech Red Raiders football

Gator Bowl, L 21–31 vs. Georgia Tech
- Conference: Southwest Conference

Ranking
- Coaches: No. 10
- Record: 8–3 (5–2 SWC)
- Head coach: J. T. King (5th season)
- Offensive scheme: T formation
- Base defense: 4–3
- Home stadium: Jones Stadium

1965 Southwest Conference football standings
| | Conf. | | | | | Overall |
| Team | W | | L | | T | W | | L | | T |
|---|---|---|---|---|---|---|---|---|---|---|
| No. 3 Arkansas $ | 7 | – | 0 | – | 0 | 10 | – | 1 | – | 0 |
| Texas Tech | 5 | – | 2 | – | 0 | 8 | – | 3 | – | 0 |
| TCU | 5 | – | 2 | – | 0 | 6 | – | 5 | – | 0 |
| Texas | 3 | – | 4 | – | 0 | 6 | – | 4 | – | 0 |
| Baylor | 3 | – | 4 | – | 0 | 5 | – | 5 | – | 0 |
| SMU | 3 | – | 4 | – | 0 | 4 | – | 5 | – | 1 |
| Texas A&M | 1 | – | 6 | – | 0 | 3 | – | 7 | – | 0 |
| Rice | 1 | – | 6 | – | 0 | 2 | – | 8 | – | 0 |
$ – Conference champion; Rankings from AP Poll

The 1965 Texas Tech Red Raiders football team represented Texas Technological College—now known as Texas Tech University—as a member of the Southwest Conference (SWC) during the 1965 NCAA University Division football season. In their fifth season under head coach J. T. King, the Red Raiders compiled an 8–3 record (5–2 against conference opponents), finished in second place in the SWC, lost to Georgia Tech in the 1965 Gator Bowl, and outscored opponents by a combined total of 278 to 222. The team's statistical leaders included Tom Wilson with 2,119 passing yards and Donny Anderson with 705 rushing yards and 797 receiving yards. The team played its home games at Clifford B. & Audrey Jones Stadium.

== Schedule ==
| Date | Opponent | Rank | Site | Result | Attendance | Source |
|---|---|---|---|---|---|---|
| September 18 | Kansas* | | Jones Stadium; Lubbock, TX | W 26–7 | 35,300 | |
| September 25 | at No. 3 Texas | | Memorial Stadium; Austin, TX (rivalry) | L 7–33 | 65,350 | |
| October 2 | Texas A&M | | Jones Stadium; Lubbock, TX (rivalry) | W 20–16 | 43,000 | |
| October 9 | TCU | | Jones Stadium; Lubbock, TX (rivalry) | W 28–24 | 35,000 | |
| October 16 | Oklahoma State* | | Jones Stadium; Lubbock, TX | W 17–14 | 29,825 | |
| October 23 | at SMU | | Cotton Bowl; Dallas, TX | W 26–24 | 40,000 | |
| October 30 | Rice^{†} | | Jones Stadium; Lubbock, TX | W 27–0 | 43,555 | |
| November 6 | New Mexico State* | | Jones Stadium; Lubbock, TX | W 48–9 | 28,750–28,753 | |
| November 13 | Baylor | | Jones Stadium; Lubbock, TX (rivalry) | W 34–22 | 45,619 | |
| November 20 | at No. 2 Arkansas | No. 9 | Razorback Stadium; Fayetteville, AR (rivalry) | L 24–42 | 42,000 | |
| December 31 | vs. Georgia Tech* | No. 10 | Gator Bowl Stadium; Jacksonville, FL (Gator Bowl) | L 21–31 | 60,127 | |
*Non-conference game; ^{†}Homecoming; Rankings from AP Poll released prior to the game
