= List of Oklahoma Sooners football seasons =

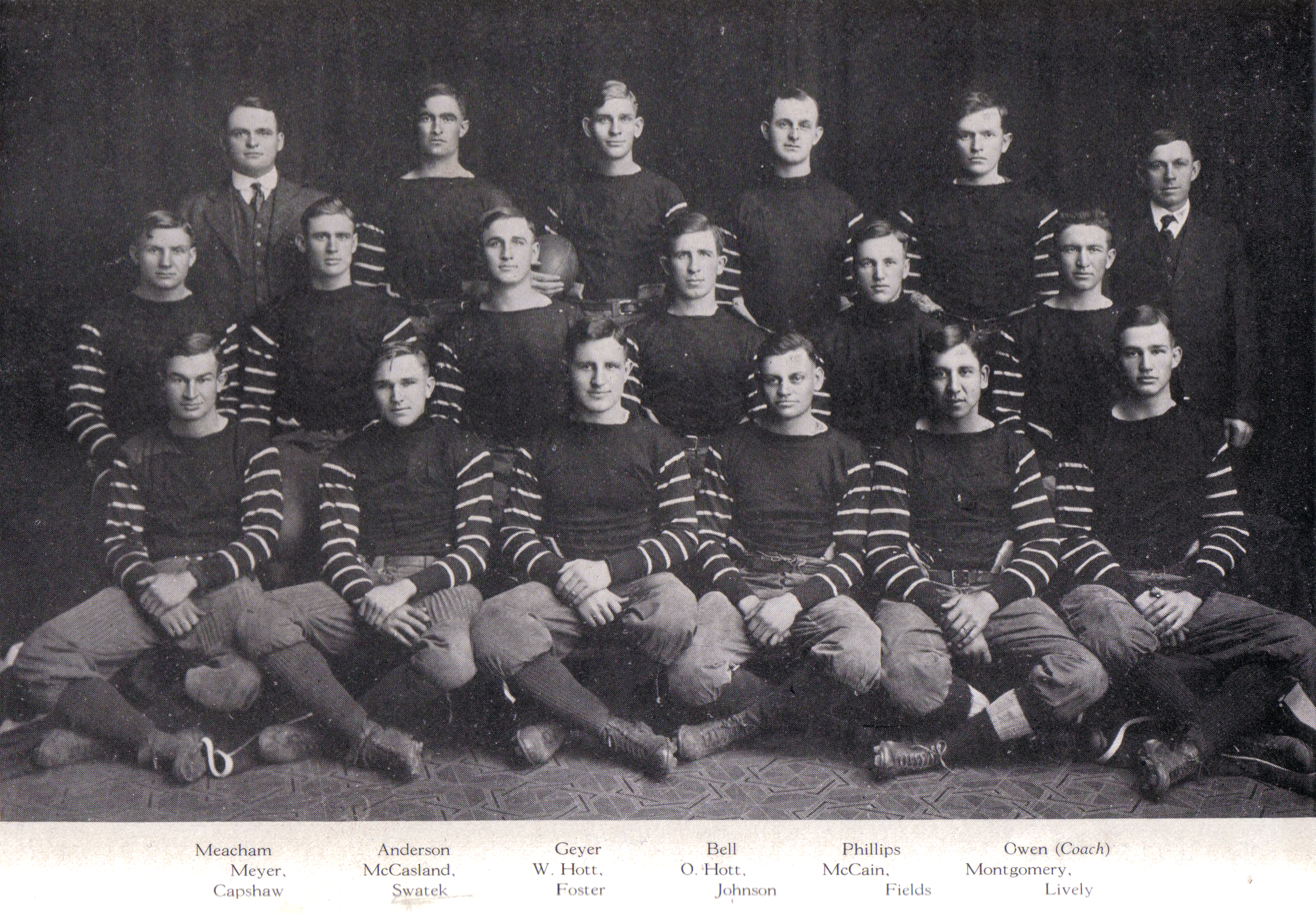
The undefeated Sooners team of 1915

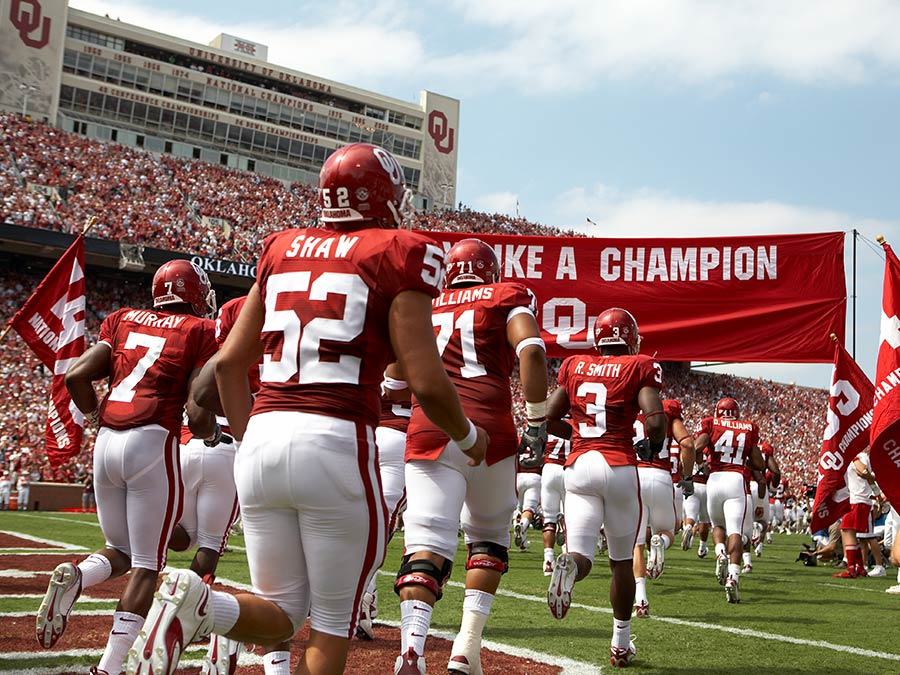
The Sooners enter the field for a game during the 2007 season.

The Oklahoma Sooners college football team compete as part of the National Collegiate Athletic Association (NCAA) Division I Football Bowl Subdivision, representing the University of Oklahoma in the Southeastern Conference. Oklahoma has played their home games at Oklahoma Memorial Stadium in Norman, Oklahoma since 1923.

The Sooners claim seven national championships. They have also recorded 50 conference championships, 12 undefeated and untied regular seasons, (Note: There have been 11 full seasons in which Oklahoma has won every game in which they played, including the postseason. The NCAA's methodology for determining an undefeated, untied season does not include Oklahoma's 1896, 1897, or 1898 campaigns, in which the Sooners won two games each without losing or tying. It does, however, include four seasons in which Oklahoma won each of their regular season games but lost their postseason bowl game (1938, 1950, 1987, and 2004).) and the longest winning streak in Division I history with 47 straight victories. The Oklahoma football program is one of the most successful programs in history, having won 950 games and possessing a .723 winning percentage, both sixth all-time. As of the end of the 2024 season, Oklahoma has appeared in the AP poll 905 times, including 101 No. 1 rankings, both third all-time.

Football was introduced to the university by John A. Harts in 1895. Harts, a student from Kansas who had played the game in his home state, presided over a single game, a loss to a more experienced team from the Oklahoma City High School. The university had its first paid coach in Vernon Louis Parrington, who led the Sooners to a record of nine wins, one loss, and two ties over four seasons. Hired in 1905, Bennie Owen brought Oklahoma to the national stage during his 22-year tenure as head coach. He retired with a 122–54–16 record, including four seasons in which the team went unbeaten. During Owen's tenure, Oklahoma became a charter member of the Southwest Conference, in which they remained for five years before leaving to join the Missouri Valley Intercollegiate Athletic Association. The MVIAA conference would later transform into the Big Six, Big Seven, and finally the Big Eight Conference.

In 1947, Oklahoma promoted Bud Wilkinson, then an assistant coach, to head coach. Wilkinson led the Sooners to national championships in 1950, 1955 and 1956, as well as a stretch of 47 consecutive victories that began in 1953 and ended in 1957. Wilkinson's tenure included a streak of 13 consecutive conference championships (in addition to one by his predecessor). After 17 seasons at the helm, Wilkinson retired with a 145–29–4 record.

Oklahoma continued to perform well after Wilkinson left, but only returned to the national title picture following the promotion of Barry Switzer to head coach in 1973. The Sooners won the Big Eight in each of his first eight years as coach and earned national championships in 1974 and 1975. Switzer added Oklahoma's sixth national championship in 1985 and bested Wilkinson's school record for victories by a coach, stepping down prior to the 1989 season with a 157–29–4 record.

After a decline that lasted more than a decade, Oklahoma again won the national championship in 2000, after coach Bob Stoops had been hired the previous year. By then Oklahoma had joined a new conference, the Big 12 Conference, formed as a combination of the Big Eight Conference and four Texas schools of the defunct Southwest Conference. Stoops coached 239 games during his time at Oklahoma, winning 191 of them. Both figures are the most of any coach in school history. Stoops won ten conference championships and led the Sooners to the BCS National Championship Game four times. However, 2000 remains Oklahoma's most recent championship game victory. Lincoln Riley, who succeeded Stoops as coach in 2017, took the Sooners to the College Football Playoff four times, losing in the semifinal round on each occasion. Following Riley's departure, current head coach Brent Venables was appointed to the position.

Through the 2025 season, Oklahoma has compiled an overall record of 959 wins, 350 losses, and 53 ties. The Sooners have appeared in 58 bowl games, most recently in the 2024 Armed Forces Bowl, with 31 bowl victories, 26 losses and 1 tie in their history.

== Seasons ==
National champions †	Conference champions *	Division champions ‡	Bowl game berth	College Football Playoff game §	Shared standing T	Not applicable

Season	Team	Head coach	Season results							Championship and postseason results	Final ranking	
Season	Team	Head coach	Conference				Overall			Championship and postseason results	AP	Coaches'
Season	Team	Head coach	Finish^{(Note: When in a division, it shows their position within the division. Otherwise the overall position in the division-less conference is listed.)}	Win(s)	Loss(es)	Tie(s)^{(Note: Overtime rules in college football were introduced in 1996, making ties impossible in the period since.)}	Win(s)	Loss(es)	Tie(s)	Championship and postseason results	AP	Coaches'
Oklahoma Sooners
Independent (1895–1914)
1895	1895	John A. Harts					0	1	0			
1896	1896	No coach					2	0	0			
1897	1897	Vernon L. Parrington					2	0	0			
1898	1898	Vernon L. Parrington					2	0	0			
1899	1899	Vernon L. Parrington					2	1	0			
1900	1900	Vernon L. Parrington					3	1	1			
1901	1901	Fred Roberts					3	2	0			
1902	1902	Mark McMahon					6	3	0			
1903	1903	Mark McMahon					5	4	3			
1904	1904	Fred Ewing					4	3	1			
1905	1905	Bennie Owen					7	2	0			
1906	1906	Bennie Owen					5	2	2			
1907	1907	Bennie Owen					4	4	0			
1908	1908	Bennie Owen					8	1	1			
1909	1909	Bennie Owen					6	4	0			
1910	1910	Bennie Owen					4	2	1			
1911	1911	Bennie Owen					8	0	0			
1912	1912	Bennie Owen					5	4	0			
1913	1913	Bennie Owen					6	2	0			
1914	1914	Bennie Owen					9	1	1			
Southwest Conference (1915–1919)
1915	1915 *	Bennie Owen	T–1st	3	0	0	10	0	0			
1916	1916	Bennie Owen	T–3rd	2	1	0	6	5	0			
1917	1917	Bennie Owen	3rd	1	1	1	6	4	1			
1918	1918 *	Bennie Owen	1st	2	0	0	6	0	0			
1919	1919	Bennie Owen	3rd	2	1	0	5	3	2			
Missouri Valley Intercollegiate Athletic Association (1920–1928)
1920	1920 *	Bennie Owen	1st	4	0	1	6	0	1			
1921	1921	Bennie Owen	T–7th	2	3	0	5	3	0			
1922	1922	Bennie Owen	6th	1	2	2	2	3	3			
1923	1923	Bennie Owen	6th	2	4	0	3	5	0			
1924	1924	Bennie Owen	6th	2	3	1	2	5	1			
1925	1925	Bennie Owen	5th	3	3	1	4	1	3			
1926	1926	Bennie Owen	5th	3	2	1	5	2	1			
1927	1927	Adrian Lindsey	T–7th	2	3	0	3	3	2			
1928	1928	Adrian Lindsey	T–2nd	3	2	0	5	3	0			
Big Six Conference (1929–1947)
1929	1929	Adrian Lindsey	4th	2	2	1	3	3	2			
1930	1930	Adrian Lindsey	2nd	3	1	1	4	1	3			
1931	1931	Adrian Lindsey	T–5th	1	4	0	4	7	1			
1932	1932	Lewie Hardage	T–2nd	3	2	0	4	4	1			
1933	1933	Lewie Hardage	3rd	3	2	0	4	4	1			
1934	1934	Lewie Hardage	3rd	2	2	1	3	4	2			
1935	1935	Biff Jones	2nd	3	2	0	6	3	0			
1936	1936	Biff Jones	4th	1	2	2	3	3	3			
1937	1937	Thomas E. Stidham	2nd	3	1	1	5	2	2			
1938	1938 *	Thomas E. Stidham	1st	5	0	0	10	1	0	Lost Orange Bowl against Tennessee, 17–0	4	
1939	1939	Thomas E. Stidham	3rd	3	2	0	6	2	1		19	
1940	1940	Thomas E. Stidham	2nd	4	1	0	6	3	0			
1941	1941	Dewey Luster	T–2nd	3	2	0	6	3	0			
1942	1942	Dewey Luster	2nd	3	1	1	3	5	2			
1943	1943 *	Dewey Luster	1st	6	0	0	7	2	0			
1944	1944 *	Dewey Luster	1st	4	0	1	6	3	1			
1945	1945	Dewey Luster	2nd	4	1	0	5	5	0			
1946	1946 *	Jim Tatum	T–1st	4	1	0	8	3	0	Won Gator Bowl against NC State, 34–13	14	
1947	1947 *	Bud Wilkinson	T–1st	4	0	1	7	2	1		16	
Big Seven Conference (1948–1958)
1948	1948 *	Bud Wilkinson	1st	5	0	0	10	1	0	Won Sugar Bowl against North Carolina, 14–6	5	
1949	1949 *	Bud Wilkinson	1st	5	0	0	11	0	0	Won Sugar Bowl against LSU, 35–0	2	
1950	1950 †*	Bud Wilkinson	1st	6	0	0	10	1	0	Lost Sugar Bowl against Kentucky, 13–7	1	1
1951	1951 *	Bud Wilkinson	1st	6	0	0	8	2	0		10	11
1952	1952 *	Bud Wilkinson	1st	5	0	1	8	1	1		4	4
1953	1953 *	Bud Wilkinson	1st	6	0	0	9	1	1	Won Orange Bowl against Maryland, 7–0	4	5
1954	1954 *	Bud Wilkinson	1st	6	0	0	10	0	0	Consecutive bowl appearances prohibited by conference	3	3
1955	1955 †*	Bud Wilkinson	1st	6	0	0	11	0	0	Won Orange Bowl against Maryland, 20–6	1	1
1956	1956 †*	Bud Wilkinson	1st	6	0	0	10	0	0	Consecutive bowl appearances prohibited by conference	1	1
1957	1957 *	Bud Wilkinson	1st	6	0	0	10	1	0	Won Orange Bowl against Duke, 48–21	4	4
1958	1958 *	Bud Wilkinson	1st	7	0	0	10	1	0	Won Orange Bowl against Syracuse, 21–6	5	5
Big Eight Conference (1959–1995)
1959	1959 *	Bud Wilkinson	1st	6	1	0	7	3	0		15	15
1960	1960	Bud Wilkinson	5th	2	4	1	3	6	1	Ineligible due to N.C.A.A. probation		
1961	1961	Bud Wilkinson	4th	4	3	0	5	5	0			
1962	1962 *	Bud Wilkinson	1st	7	0	0	8	3	0	Lost Orange Bowl against Alabama, 17–0	8	7
1963	1963	Bud Wilkinson	2nd	6	1	0	8	2	0		9	8
1964	1964	Gomer Jones	2nd	5	1	1	6	4	1	Lost Gator Bowl against Florida State, 36–19		
1965	1965	Gomer Jones	5th	3	4	0	3	7	0			
1966	1966	Jim Mackenzie	5th	4	3	0	6	4	0			
1967	1967 *	Chuck Fairbanks	1st	7	0	0	10	1	0	Won Orange Bowl against Tennessee, 26–24	3	3
1968	1968 *	Chuck Fairbanks	T–1st	6	1	0	7	4	0	Lost Bluebonnet Bowl against SMU, 28–27	11	10
1969	1969	Chuck Fairbanks	4th	4	3	0	6	4	0			
1970	1970	Chuck Fairbanks	T–2nd	5	2	0	7	4	1	Tied Bluebonnet Bowl against Alabama, 24–24	20	15
1971	1971	Chuck Fairbanks	2nd	6	1	0	11	1	0	Won Sugar Bowl against Auburn, 40–22	2	3
1972	1972 *	Chuck Fairbanks	1st	6	1	0	11	1	0	Won Sugar Bowl against Penn State, 14–0	2	2
1973	1973 *	Barry Switzer	1st	7	0	0	10	0	1	Ineligible due to N.C.A.A. probation		
1974	1974 †*	Barry Switzer	1st	7	0	0	11	0	0	Ineligible due to N.C.A.A. probation		
1975	1975 †*	Barry Switzer	1st	6	1	0	11	1	0	Won Orange Bowl against Michigan, 14–6	1	1
1976	1976 *	Barry Switzer	T–1st	5	2	0	9	2	1	Won Fiesta Bowl against Wyoming, 41–7	5	6
1977	1977 *	Barry Switzer	1st	7	0	0	10	2	0	Lost Orange Bowl against Arkansas, 31–6	7	6
1978	1978 *	Barry Switzer	T–1st	6	1	0	11	1	0	Won Orange Bowl against Nebraska, 31–24	3	3
1979	1979 *	Barry Switzer	1st	7	0	0	11	1	0	Won Orange Bowl against Florida State, 24–7	3	3
1980	1980 *	Barry Switzer	1st	7	0	0	10	2	0	Won Orange Bowl against Florida State, 18–17	3	3
1981	1981	Barry Switzer	2nd	4	2	1	7	4	1	Won Sun Bowl against Houston, 40–14	20	14
1982	1982	Barry Switzer	2nd	6	1	0	8	4	0	Lost Fiesta Bowl against Arizona State, 32–21	16	16
1983	1983	Barry Switzer	2nd	5	2	0	8	4	0			
1984	1984 *	Barry Switzer	T–1st	6	1	0	9	2	1	Lost Orange Bowl against Washington, 28–17	6	6
1985	1985 †*	Barry Switzer	1st	7	0	0	11	1	0	Won Orange Bowl against Penn State, 25–10	1	1
1986	1986 *	Barry Switzer	1st	7	0	0	11	1	0	Won Orange Bowl against Arkansas, 42–8	3	3
1987	1987 *	Barry Switzer	1st	7	0	0	11	1	0	Lost Orange Bowl against Miami, 20–14	3	3
1988	1988	Barry Switzer	2nd	6	1	0	9	3	0	Lost Citrus Bowl against Clemson, 13–6	14	14
1989	1989	Gary Gibbs	3rd	5	2	0	7	4	0	Ineligible due to N.C.A.A. probation		
1990	1990	Gary Gibbs	T–2nd	5	2	0	8	3	0	Ineligible due to N.C.A.A. probation		
1991	1991	Gary Gibbs	3rd	5	2	0	9	3	0	Won Gator Bowl against Virginia, 48–14	16	14
1992	1992	Gary Gibbs	4th	3	2	2	5	4	2			
1993	1993	Gary Gibbs	4th	4	3	0	9	3	0	Won John Hancock Bowl against Texas Tech, 41–10	17	14
1994	1994	Gary Gibbs	4th	4	3	0	6	6	0	Lost Copper Bowl against BYU, 31–6		
1995	1995	Howard Schnellenberger	T–5th	2	5	0	5	5	1			
Big 12 Conference (1996–2023)
1996	1996	John Blake	4th (South)	3	5		3	8				
1997	1997	John Blake	T–4th (South)	2	6		4	8				
1998	1998	John Blake	T–4th (South)	3	5		5	6				
1999	1999	Bob Stoops	T–2nd (South)	5	3		7	5		Lost Independence Bowl against Ole Miss, 27–25		
2000	2000 †*	Bob Stoops	1st (South)	8	0		13	0		Won Orange Bowl against Florida State, 13–2	1	1
2001	2001	Bob Stoops	2nd (South)	6	2		11	2		Won Cotton Bowl Classic against Arkansas, 10–3	6	6
2002	2002 *	Bob Stoops	1st (South)	6	2		12	2		Won Rose Bowl against Washington State, 34–14	5	5
2003	2003 ‡	Bob Stoops	1st (South)	8	0		12	2		Lost Sugar Bowl against LSU, 21–14	3	3
2004	2004 *	Bob Stoops	1st (South)	8	0		12	1		Lost Orange Bowl against USC, 55–19	3	3
2005	2005	Bob Stoops	T–2nd (South)	6	2		8	4		Won Holiday Bowl against Oregon, 17–14	22	22
2006	2006 *	Bob Stoops	1st (South)	7	1		11	3		Lost Fiesta Bowl against Boise State, 43–42 (OT)	11	11
2007	2007 *	Bob Stoops	1st (South)	6	2		11	3		Lost Fiesta Bowl against West Virginia, 48–28	8	8
2008	2008 *	Bob Stoops	T–1st (South)	7	1		12	2		Lost BCS Championship Game against Florida, 24–14	5	5
2009	2009	Bob Stoops	T–3rd (South)	5	3		8	5		Won Sun Bowl against Stanford, 31–27		
2010	2010 *	Bob Stoops	T–1st (South)	6	2		12	2		Won Fiesta Bowl against UConn, 48–20	6	6
2011	2011	Bob Stoops	T–3rd	6	3		10	3		Won Insight Bowl against Iowa, 31–14	16	15
2012	2012 *	Bob Stoops	T–1st	8	1		10	3		Lost Cotton Bowl against Texas A&M, 41–13	15	15
2013	2013	Bob Stoops	T–2nd	7	2		11	2		Won Sugar Bowl against Alabama, 45–31	6	6
2014	2014	Bob Stoops	T–4th	5	4		8	5		Lost Russell Athletic Bowl against Clemson, 40–6		
2015	2015 *	Bob Stoops	1st	8	1		11	2		Lost Orange Bowl against Clemson, 37–17 §	5	5
2016	2016 *	Bob Stoops	1st	9	0		11	2		Won Sugar Bowl against Auburn, 35–19	5	3
2017	2017 *	Lincoln Riley	1st	8	1		12	2		Lost Rose Bowl against Georgia, 54–48 2OT §	3	3
2018	2018 *	Lincoln Riley	1st	8	1		12	2		Lost Orange Bowl against Alabama, 45–34 §	4	4
2019	2019 *	Lincoln Riley	1st	8	1		12	2		Lost Peach Bowl against LSU 63–28 §	7	6
2020	2020 *	Lincoln Riley	1st	6	2		9	2		Won Cotton Bowl against Florida 55–20	6	6
2021	2021	Lincoln Riley; Bob Stoops	3rd	7	2		11	2		Won Alamo Bowl against Oregon 47–32	10	10
2022	2022	Brent Venables	T–7th	3	6		6	7		Lost Cheez-It Bowl against Florida State 35–32		
2023	2023	Brent Venables	T–2nd	7	2		10	3		Lost Alamo Bowl against Arizona 38–24	15	15
Southeastern Conference (2024–present)
2024	2024	Brent Venables	T–13th	2	6		6	7		Lost Armed Forces Bowl against Navy 21–20		
2025	2025	Brent Venables	T–5th	6	2		10	3		Lost CFP First Round vs. Alabama 24–34 §	13	10
Total							928	325	52	(only includes regular season games)		
Total							31	26	1	(only includes bowl games)		
Total							959	351	53	(all games)		
