= 1966 Oklahoma State Cowboys football team =

American college football season

1966 Oklahoma State Cowboys football
- Conference: Big Eight Conference
- Record: 4–5–1 (4–2–1 Big 8)
- Head coach: Phil Cutchin (4th season)
- Home stadium: Lewis Field

1966 Big Eight Conference football standings
	Conf.					Overall
Team	W		L		T	W		L		T
No. 6 Nebraska $	6	–	1	–	0	9	–	2	–	0
Colorado	5	–	2	–	0	7	–	3	–	0
Missouri	4	–	2	–	1	6	–	3	–	1
Oklahoma State	4	–	2	–	1	4	–	5	–	1
Oklahoma	4	–	3	–	0	6	–	4	–	0
Iowa State	2	–	3	–	2	2	–	6	–	2
Kansas	0	–	6	–	1	2	–	7	–	1
Kansas State	0	–	6	–	1	0	–	9	–	1
$ – Conference champion; Rankings from AP Poll

The 1966 Oklahoma State Cowboys football team represented Oklahoma State University as a member of the Big Eight Conference during the 1966 NCAA University Division football season. Led by fourth-year head coach, the Cowboys compiled an overall record of 4–5–1 with a mark of 4–2–1, tying for third place in the Big 8. Oklahoma State played home game at Lewis Field in Stillwater, Oklahoma.

== Schedule ==
Date	Opponent	Site	Result	Attendance	Source
September 17	at No. 5 Arkansas*	War Memorial Stadium; Little Rock, AR	L 10–14	47,000	
October 1	Houston*	Houston Astrodome; Houston, TX	L 9–35	43,743	
October 8	Colorado	Lewis Field; Stillwater, OK	W 11–10	27,000	
October 15	at Missouri	Memorial Stadium; Columbia, MO	L 0–7	54,000	
October 22	Kansas	Lewis Field; Stillwater, OK	W 10–7	21,000	
October 29	Iowa State^{†}	Lewis Field; Stillwater, OK	T 14–14	33,500	
November 5	at Texas Tech*	Jones Stadium; Lubbock, TX	L 7–10	28,175	
November 12	at No. 4 Nebraska	Memorial Stadium; Lincoln, NE	L 6–21	65,102	
November 19	at Kansas State	Memorial Stadium; Manhattan, KS	W 21–6	9,300	
December 3	Oklahoma	Lewis Field; Stillwater, OK (Bedlam Series)	W 15–14	38,000	
*Non-conference game; ^{†}Homecoming; Rankings from AP Poll released prior to the game; Source:

== Game summaries ==
=== Oklahoma ===
Team	1	2	3	4	Total
Oklahoma	0	0	8	6	14
• Oklahoma State	0	8	0	7	15

- Date: December 3
- Location: Lewis Field, Stillwater, Oklahoma
- Game attendance: 36,581

Scoring summary
2		OSU	Ronnie Johnson 10-yard run (Ronnie Johnson to Tommy Boone pass)	OSU 8-0
3		OU	Ron Shotts 3-yard run (Bob Warmack to Bob Kalsu pass)	Tied 8-8
4		OSU	Ronnie Johnson 4-yard run (Craig Kessler kick)	OSU 15-8
4	1:29	OU	Ron Shotts 1-yard run (pass failed)	OSU 15-14

Oklahoma State defensive backs Charlie Trimble and Willard Nahrgang stopped Oklahoma tailback Ron Shotts at the two on the conversion play to preserve their second straight win over the Sooners.

== After the season ==
The 1967 NFL/AFL draft was held on March 14–15, 1967. The following Cowboys were selected.

Round	Pick	Player	Position	NFL club
3	66	Dennis Randall	Defensive end	New York Jets
3	67	Harold Akin	Tackle	San Diego Chargers
3	71	Leon Ward	Linebacker	Baltimore Colts
12	307	J. B. Christian	Guard	Baltimore Colts
17	435	Terry Bacigalupo	Defensive end	St. Louis Cardinals
