= 1965 Texas A&M Aggies football team =

American college football season

1965 Texas A&M Aggies football
- Conference: Southwest Conference
- Record: 3–7 (1–6 SWC)
- Head coach: Gene Stallings (1st season)
- Home stadium: Kyle Field

1965 Southwest Conference football standings
	Conf.					Overall
Team	W		L		T	W		L		T
No. 3 Arkansas $	7	–	0	–	0	10	–	1	–	0
Texas Tech	5	–	2	–	0	8	–	3	–	0
TCU	5	–	2	–	0	6	–	5	–	0
Texas	3	–	4	–	0	6	–	4	–	0
Baylor	3	–	4	–	0	5	–	5	–	0
SMU	3	–	4	–	0	4	–	5	–	1
Texas A&M	1	–	6	–	0	3	–	7	–	0
Rice	1	–	6	–	0	2	–	8	–	0
$ – Conference champion; Rankings from AP Poll

The 1965 Texas A&M Aggies football team represented Texas A&M University in the 1965 NCAA University Division football season as a member of the Southwest Conference (SWC). The Aggies were led by head coach Gene Stallings in his first season and finished with a record of three wins and seven losses (3–7 overall, 1–6 in the SWC).

== Schedule ==
Date	Opponent	Site	Result	Attendance	Source
September 18	at No. 8 LSU*	Tiger Stadium; Baton Rouge, LA (rivalry)	L 0–10	68,000	
September 25	at Georgia Tech*	Grant Field; Atlanta, GA	W 14–10	45,843	
October 2	at Texas Tech	Jones Stadium; Lubbock, TX (rivalry)	L 16–20	43,000	
October 9	Houston*	Kyle Field; College Station, TX	W 10–7	35,000	
October 16	at TCU	Amon G. Carter Stadium; Fort Worth, TX	L 9–17	35,096	
October 23	Baylor	Kyle Field; College Station, TX (rivalr)	L 0–31	26,000	
October 30	at No. 2 Arkansas	War Memorial Stadium; Little Rock, AR (rivalry)	L 0–31	47,000	
November 6	SMU	Kyle Field; College Station, TX	L 0–10	19,000	
November 13	at Rice	Rice Stadium; Houston, TX	W 14–13	45,000	
November 25	Texas	Kyle Field; College Station, TX (rivalry)	L 17–21	40,000	
*Non-conference game; Rankings from Coaches' Poll released prior to the game

== Season summary ==
=== Texas ===
- Ken McLean 13 Rec, 250 Yds

External videos
- 1965 Texas vs. Texas A&M – The Texas Special

== Personnel ==
1965 Texas A&M Aggies football team roster
Players
Coaches
Offense

Pos.	#	Name	Class
WB		Jim Kauffman
QB		Harry Ledbetter
		Ken McLean

Defense

Pos.	#	Name	Class

Special teams

Pos.	#	Name	Class

Head coach

- Gene Stallings

Coordinators/assistant coaches

Legend

- (C) Team captain
- (S) Suspended
- (I) Ineligible
- Injured
- Redshirt
