= 1965 Gator Bowl (December) =

American college football game

Georgia Tech Yellow Jackets	Texas Tech Red Raiders
(6-3–1)	(8-2)
Independent	SWC
31	21
Head coach: Bobby Dodd	Head coach: J. T. King
	AP / Coaches; 10 / 10
	1	2	3	4	Total
Georgia Tech	0	9	7	15	31
Texas Tech	0	7	0	14	21
- Date: December 31, 1965
- Season: 1965
- Stadium: Gator Bowl Stadium
- Location: Jacksonville, Florida
- MVP: TB Lenny Snow (Georgia Tech); RB Donny Anderson (Texas Tech)
- Referee: Clifford Domingue (SWC; split crew: SWC, SEC)
- Attendance: 60,127

United States TV coverage
- Network: ABC
- Announcers: Chris Schenkel, Johnny Lujack

The 1965 Gator Bowl (December) was a college football postseason bowl game that featured the Georgia Tech Yellow Jackets and the Texas Tech Red Raiders.

== Background ==
Georgia Tech tied Vanderbilt, lost to Texas A&M, Tennessee and Georgia in their 2nd season as an independent. This was Georgia Tech's fourth bowl game of the decade along with their four Gator Bowl in nine years. The Red Raiders finished 2nd in the Southwest Conference, with their only losses being to #3 Texas and #2 Arkansas. This was the second bowl appearance of the Red Raiders in the decade, along with their first Gator Bowl appearance since 1954.

== Game summary ==
- Georgia Tech – Giles Smith, 2 yard touchdown run (Bunky Henry kick)
- Georgia Tech – Safety
- Georgia Tech – Lenny Snow, 1 yard touchdown run (Henry kick)
- Texas Tech – Donny Anderson, 1 yard touchdown run (Gill kick)
- Texas Tech – Jerry Shipley, 15 yard touchdown pass from Wilson (Gill kick)
- Georgia Tech – Jerry Priestly, 1 yard touchdown run (Priestly run)
- Georgia Tech – Ed Varner, 13 yard touchdown run (Henry kick)

Lenny Snow rushed for 136 yards on 35 carries for Georgia Tech. Donny Anderson rushed for 85 yards on 13 carries, while catching 9 passes for 138 yards. Georgia Tech had 10 more first downs than Tech (27 to 17), 364 rushing yards to the Red Raiders' 113, while being outpassed 283 to 77. Texas Tech turned the ball over five times; Georgia Tech turned it over just twice.

== Statistics ==
Statistics	Georgia Tech	Texas Tech
First downs	27	17
Rushing yards	368	112
Passing yards	77	283
Total offense	445	395
Passing	5–10–1	22–40–2
Fumbles–lost	2–1	3–3
Penalties–yards	4–57	3–25
Punts–average	3–41.0	5–32.0

== Aftermath ==
Dodd would coach one more bowl game before his retirement in 1967. Georgia Tech did not reach the Gator Bowl again until 1999. Texas Tech did not make another bowl game until 1970, or reach the Gator Bowl until 1973.
