= Dick Kasperek =

American football player (born 1943)

No. 51
- Position: Center

Personal information
- Born: February 6, 1943 (age 83); St. Peter, Minnesota, U.S.
- Listed height: 6 ft 3 in (1.91 m)
- Listed weight: 225 lb (102 kg)

Career information
- High school: Le Sueur (Le Sueur, Minnesota)
- College: Iowa State (1962-1965)
- NFL draft: 1966: 16th round, 238th overall pick

Career history
- St. Louis Cardinals (1966–1968)

Awards and highlights
- First-team All-Big Eight (1965)

Career NFL statistics
- Games played: 20
- Stats at Pro Football Reference

Dick Kasperek (born February 6, 1943) is an American former professional football player who played center for three seasons for the St. Louis Cardinals of the National Football League.
