= 1965 Arkansas Razorbacks football team =

American college football season

1965 Arkansas Razorbacks football

SWC champion

Cotton Bowl Classic, L 14–7 vs. LSU
- Conference: Southwest Conference

Ranking
- Coaches: No. 2
- AP: No. 3
- Record: 10–1 (7–0 SWC)
- Head coach: Frank Broyles (8th season)
- Captain: Seniors
- Home stadium: Razorback Stadium; War Memorial Stadium

1965 Southwest Conference football standings
	Conf.					Overall
Team	W		L		T	W		L		T
No. 3 Arkansas $	7	–	0	–	0	10	–	1	–	0
Texas Tech	5	–	2	–	0	8	–	3	–	0
TCU	5	–	2	–	0	6	–	5	–	0
Texas	3	–	4	–	0	6	–	4	–	0
Baylor	3	–	4	–	0	5	–	5	–	0
SMU	3	–	4	–	0	4	–	5	–	1
Texas A&M	1	–	6	–	0	3	–	7	–	0
Rice	1	–	6	–	0	2	–	8	–	0
$ – Conference champion; Rankings from AP Poll

The 1965 Arkansas Razorbacks football team represented the University of Arkansas in the Southwest Conference (SWC) during the 1965 NCAA University Division football season. In their eighth year under head coach Frank Broyles, the Razorbacks compiled a 10–1 record (7–0 against SWC opponents), won the SWC championship, and outscored all opponents by a combined total of 331 to 118. The Razorbacks were undefeated in the regular season and ranked #3 in the final AP Poll and #2 in the final UPI Coaches Poll. They went on to lose to LSU in the 1966 Cotton Bowl Classic by a 14–7 score, due in large part to Arkansas QB Jon Brittenum going down with an injury in the first half. That loss denied Arkansas the AP national championship.

Running back Bobby Burnett tied three others in scoring, with 16 touchdowns, the fourth-highest total in the nation. Ronny South was second in kick scoring, with 42 extra points and six field goals. As an offensive unit, the Razorbacks had the best scoring offense (32.4 ppg), the eighth-best rushing offense (226.1 ypg), seventh-best total offense (360.2 ypg) nationally. The defense was fourth-best against the run (74.9 yards allowed per game).

== Schedule ==
Date	Opponent	Rank	Site	TV	Result	Attendance	Source
September 18	Oklahoma State*	No. 6	War Memorial Stadium; Little Rock, AR		W 28–14	40,115	
September 25	Tulsa*	No. 5	Razorback Stadium; Fayetteville, AR		W 20–12	34,000	
October 2	TCU	No. 4	War Memorial Stadium; Little Rock, AR		W 28–0	47,000	
October 9	at Baylor	No. 3	Baylor Stadium; Waco, TX		W 38–7	35,000	
October 16	No. 1 Texas	No. 3	Razorback Stadium; Fayetteville, AR (rivalry)	NBC	W 27–24	39,510–42,000	
October 23	North Texas State*	No. 1	War Memorial Stadium; Little Rock, AR		W 55–20	35,000–42,000	
October 30	Texas A&M	No. 2	War Memorial Stadium; Little Rock, AR (rivalry)		W 31–0	47,000	
November 6	at Rice	No. 2	Rice Stadium; Houston, TX		W 31–0	46,000	
November 13	at SMU	No. 2	Cotton Bowl; Dallas, TX		W 24–3	67,000	
November 20	No. 9 Texas Tech	No. 2	Razorback Stadium; Fayetteville, AR (rivalry)	NBC	W 42–24	42,000	
January 1	vs. LSU*	No. 2	Cotton Bowl; Dallas, TX (Cotton Bowl Classic, rivalry)	CBS	L 7–14	76,200	
*Non-conference game; Rankings from AP Poll released prior to the game

== Game summaries ==
=== Texas ===
Team	1	2	3	4	Total
Texas	0	11	3	10	24
• Arkansas	13	7	0	7	27

- Date: October 16
- Location: Razorback Stadium, Fayetteville, Arkansas

Scoring summary
1		ARK	Bercher recovered fumble in end zone (South kick)	ARK 7-0
1		ARK	Trantham 77-yard fumble return (kick blocked)	ARK 13-0
2		ARK	Crockett 11-yard pass from Brittenum (South kick)	ARK 20-0
2		TEX	Conway 35-yard field goal	ARK 20-3
2		TEX	Kristynik 1-yard run (Lott run)	ARK 20-11
3		TEX	Conway 34-yard field goal	ARK 20-14
4		TEX	Kristynik 14-yard run	TEX 21-20
4		TEX	Conway 34-yard field goal	TEX 24-20
4	1:32	ARK	Brittenum 1-yard run (South kick)	ARK 27-24

=== Cotton Bowl ===
	1	2	3	4	Total
Razorbacks	7	0	0	0	7
Tigers	0	14	0	0	14

The Arkansas Razorbacks put their 22-game win streak on the line in the 1966 Cotton Bowl Classic against their rivals, the Tigers of LSU. Arkansas had the number-one scoring offense coming into the game, averaging 32.4 points per contest.

Arkansas took the ball to the end zone on the opening drive, capped by a 19-yard toss from Jon Brittenum to All-American end Bobby Crockett. Running back Joe LaBruzzo then ran in from three yards out for the Bengal Tigers to tie the game at 7. Razorback QB Brittenum then left the game after suffering a shoulder injury and the Hogs fumbled the ball three plays later. LaBruzzo again scored, this time from one yard away, giving the Tigers a 14–7 halftime lead.

Neither team scored in the second half, and Arkansas ended the game on the LSU 24-yard line. Razorback Bobby Crockett set a bowl record with 10 catches for 129 yards.

Scoring summary

Quarter	Time	Drive			Team	Scoring information	Score	
Quarter	Time	Plays	Yards	TOP	Team	Scoring information	ARK	LSU
1			87		ARK	Bobby Crockett 19-yard touchdown reception from Harry Wilson, Ronny South kick good	7	0
2			80		LSU	Joe LaBruzzo 3-yard touchdown run, Moneau kick good	7	7
2			34		LSU	Joe LaBruzzo 1-yard touchdown run, Moneau kick good	7	14
"TOP" = time of possession. For other American football terms, see Glossary of American football.							7	14
