= Pete Tatman =

American football player (born 1945)

No. 33
- Position: Fullback

Personal information
- Born: April 27, 1945 (age 81); Sutherland, Nebraska, U.S.
- Listed height: 6 ft 1 in (1.85 m)
- Listed weight: 220 lb (100 kg)

Career information
- High school: North Platte (North Platte, Nebraska)
- College: Nebraska (1963–1966)
- NFL draft: 1967: 10th round, 244th overall pick

Career history
- Minnesota Vikings (1967)*; Detroit Lions (1967)*; Minnesota Vikings (1967); Omaha Mustangs (1968–1969)
- * Offseason or practice squad member only
- Stats at Pro Football Reference

Allen Kent "Pete" Tatman (born April 27, 1945) is an American former professional football fullback who played for the Minnesota Vikings of the National Football League (NFL). He played college football at Nebraska, and was selected by the Vikings in the tenth round of the 1967 NFL/AFL draft.

== Early life ==
Allen Kent Tatman was born on April 27, 1945, in Sutherland, Nebraska. He played high school football at North Platte High School in North Platte, Nebraska, and was a two-year letterman as a running back, fullback, and linebacker.

== College career ==
Tatman enrolled at the University of Nebraska to play college football for the Cornhuskers. He was on the freshman team in 1963, and was a varsity letterman from 1964 to 1966 as a fullback. He rushed 24 times for 95 yards and two touchdowns in 1964 while also playing some linebacker on defense. He started at fullback for the first time midway through his junior year after Frank Solich suffered an injury. Tatman finished the 1965 season with 50 rushing attempts for 207 yards and six touchdowns. In September 1966, he was briefly demoted as the starting fullback after a poor blocking performance. Tatman finished the 1966 season with 107 carries for 418 yards and three touchdowns. He also caught four passes for 65 yards during his college career. At the conclusion of his college career, Tatman played in the Senior Bowl on January 7, 1967. He majored in economics and finance at Nebraska, graduating in spring 1967.

== Professional career ==
=== Minnesota Vikings (first stint) ===
Tatman was selected by the Minnesota Vikings in the tenth round, with the 244th overall pick, of the 1967 NFL/AFL draft. He signed with the team on May 5. He was waived on September 7, 1967, before the Vikings' final preseason game.

=== Detroit Lions ===
Tatman was claimed off waivers by the Detroit Lions. He was released by the Lions on September 11, 1967, before the start of the regular season.

=== Minnesota Vikings (second stint) ===
Tatman was then quickly signed to the Vikings' taxi squad. After fullback Jim Lindsey broke his left hand in the season opener, Tatman was promoted to Minnesota's active roster. He played in five games for the Vikings, returning one kickoff for 14 yards. On October 20, 1967, Tatman was waived due to Lindsey being healthy again. Tatman later re-signed with the Vikings on June 8, 1968. He was released on July 28, 1968, during training camp.

=== Omaha Mustangs ===
On August 8, 1968, Tatman signed with the Omaha Mustangs of the Continental Football League (COFL). On August 17, it was reported that the Mustangs had sold Tatman to the Detroit Lions for $7,500. However, on August 28, the Lions returned Tatman to the Mustangs as his contract could not be completed due to a technicality. During the 1968 COFL season, Tatman rushed 132 times for 559 yards and seven touchdowns, leading the team in all three categories. He also caught ten passes for 140 yards and one touchdown.

In April 1969, Tatman re-signed with Omaha for the 1969 season. He then spent some time on military leave with the United States Army Reserve before returning to the Mustangs. He recorded 144 carries for 326 yards and two touchdowns, and 24 receptions for 219 yards and two touchdowns in 1969.

== Personal life ==
After football, Tatman owned a mail order drug company and later an HIV specialty care pharmacy. As of 2013, he was living in Leawood, Kansas with his wife of 36 years.
