= Jerry Patton =

American football player (1946–1983)

No. 78, 77, 72
- Position: Defensive lineman

Personal information
- Born: March 27, 1946; Saginaw, Michigan, U.S.
- Died: May 19, 1983 (aged 37); Shreveport, Louisiana, U.S.
- Listed height: 6 ft 3 in (1.91 m)
- Listed weight: 261 lb (118 kg)

Career information
- High school: Saginaw
- College: Nebraska
- NFL draft: 1968: undrafted

Career history
- Omaha Mustangs (1968); Minnesota Vikings (1970–1971); Buffalo Bills (1972–1973); Philadelphia Eagles (1974); New England Patriots (1975)
- Stats at Pro Football Reference

Jerry Armstead Patton (March 27, 1946 – May 19, 1983) was an American football defensive lineman in the National Football League for the Minnesota Vikings, Buffalo Bills, Detroit Lions, Philadelphia Eagles, and the New England Patriots. He played college football at the University of Nebraska.
