= Iowa State–Nebraska football rivalry =

American college football rivalry

- Iowa State Cyclones Nebraska Cornhuskers
- Sport: Football
- First meeting: November 19, 1896; Nebraska, 12–4
- Latest meeting: November 6, 2010; Nebraska, 31–30 (OT)
- Trophy: None

Statistics
- Total meetings: 105
- All-time series: Nebraska leads, 86–17–2
- Largest victory: Iowa State, 33–0 (1899); Nebraska, 77–14 (1997)
- Longest win streak: Nebraska, 15 (1921–1937)
- Current win streak: Nebraska, 1 (2010–present)

Locations of Iowa State and Nebraska

The Iowa State–Nebraska football rivalry, occasionally referred to as the Big Red Rivalry, was an American college football rivalry between the Iowa State Cyclones and Nebraska Cornhuskers.

== History ==
Iowa State and Nebraska first met on November 19, 1896, a 12–4 NU victory in Lincoln. Separated by 225 miles, the schools were members of the Missouri Valley Intercollegiate Athletic Association (later the Big Eight Conference) from 1908 to 1995 and the Big 12 Conference from 1996 to 2010. ISU and NU met every year from 1926 to 2010, and played the final game at Clyde Williams Field in 1974.

Nebraska dominated the rivalry, winning 86 of 105 meetings with four separate win streaks of more than ten games. Iowa State tied or defeated Nebraska teams ranked in the national top ten four times, including a 19–10 victory in 1992 that was the only game Tom Osborne ever lost to a team that finished with more losses than wins.

The annual series ended when Nebraska joined the Big Ten Conference in 2011. The teams have not played since, and no future games are scheduled.

== Game results ==
Iowa State victories	Nebraska victories	Tie games

No.	Date	Location	Winner	Score
1	November 19, 1896	Lincoln	Nebraska	12–4
2	October 8, 1897	Ames	Iowa State	10–0
3	October 8, 1898	Lincoln	Nebraska	23–10
4	October 6, 1899	Ames	Iowa State	33–0
5	October 13, 1900	Lincoln	Nebraska	30–0
6	October 26, 1901	Lincoln	Nebraska	17–0
7	November 4, 1905	Lincoln	Nebraska	21–0
8	October 20, 1906	Lincoln	Iowa State	14–2
9	November 2, 1907	Lincoln	Nebraska	10–9
10	November 7, 1908	Omaha	Nebraska	23–17
11	November 12, 1910	Lincoln	Nebraska	24–0
12	November 4, 1911	Ames	Tie	6–6
13	November 1, 1913	Ames	Nebraska	18–9
14	October 31, 1914	Lincoln	Nebraska	20–7
15	October 30, 1915	Ames	Nebraska	21–0
16	November 4, 1916	Lincoln	Nebraska	3–0
17	November 1, 1919	Lincoln	Iowa State	3–0
18	November 19, 1921	Ames	Nebraska	35–3
19	November 25, 1922	Lincoln	Nebraska	54–6
20	November 17, 1923	Ames	Nebraska	26–14
21	October 30, 1926	Lincoln	Nebraska	31–6
22	October 1, 1927	Lincoln	Nebraska	6–0
23	October 6, 1928	Ames	Nebraska	12–0
24	November 28, 1929	Lincoln	Nebraska	31–12
25	October 18, 1930	Ames	Nebraska	14–12
26	November 21, 1931	Lincoln	Nebraska	23–0
27	October 8, 1932	Lincoln	Nebraska	12–6
28	October 14, 1933	Ames	Nebraska	20–0
29	October 27, 1934	Lincoln	Nebraska	7–6
30	October 5, 1935	Ames	Nebraska	20–7
31	October 3, 1936	Lincoln	Nebraska	34–0
32	October 9, 1937	Ames	Nebraska	20–7
33	October 8, 1938	Lincoln	Iowa State	8–7
34	October 14, 1939	Ames	Nebraska	10–7
35	November 23, 1940	Lincoln	No. 8 Nebraska	21–12
36	October 4, 1941	Ames	Nebraska	14–0
37	October 3, 1942	Lincoln	Nebraska	26–0
38	October 16, 1943	Ames	Iowa State	27–6
39	November 11, 1944	Lincoln	Iowa State	19–6
40	October 20, 1945	Ames	Iowa State	27–7
41	November 16, 1946	Lincoln	Nebraska	33–0
42	October 11, 1947	Ames	Nebraska	14–7
43	September 25, 1948	Lincoln	Nebraska	19–15
44	November 12, 1949	Ames	Nebraska	7–0
45	November 18, 1950	Lincoln	No. 18 Nebraska	20–13
46	November 10, 1951	Ames	Nebraska	34–27
47	October 4, 1952	Lincoln	Nebraska	16–0
48	November 7, 1953	Ames	Nebraska	27–19
49	October 2, 1954	Lincoln	Nebraska	39–14
50	November 5, 1955	Ames	Nebraska	10–7
51	October 6, 1956	Lincoln	Nebraska	9–7
52	November 9, 1957	Ames, IA	Iowa State	13–0
53	October 4, 1958	Lincoln	Nebraska	7–6

No.	Date	Location	Winner	Score
54	November 7, 1959	Ames	Iowa State	18–6
55	October 1, 1960	Lincoln	Iowa State	10–7
56	November 11, 1961	Ames	Nebraska	16–13
57	October 6, 1962	Lincoln	Nebraska	36–22
58	October 5, 1963	Lincoln	Nebraska	21–7
59	October 3, 1964	Ames	Nebraska	14–7
60	October 2, 1965	Lincoln	No. 3 Nebraska	44–0
61	October 1, 1966	Ames	No. 6 Nebraska	12–6
62	November 4, 1967	Lincoln	Nebraska	12–0
63	November 2, 1968	Ames	Nebraska	24–13
64	November 8, 1969	Lincoln	No. 20 Nebraska	17–3
65	November 7, 1970	Ames	No. 4 Nebraska	54–29
66	November 6, 1971	Lincoln	No. 1 Nebraska	37–0
67	November 11, 1972	Ames	Tie	23–23
68	November 10, 1973	Lincoln	No. 11 Nebraska	31–7
69	November 9, 1974	Ames	No. 9 Nebraska	23–13
70	November 15, 1975	Lincoln	No. 2 Nebraska	52–0
71	November 13, 1976	Ames	Iowa State	37–28
72	October 15, 1977	Lincoln	Iowa State	24–21
73	October 7, 1978	Ames	No. 10 Nebraska	23–0
74	November 17, 1979	Lincoln	No. 3 Nebraska	34–3
75	November 15, 1980	Ames	No. 4 Nebraska	35–0
76	November 14, 1981	Lincoln	No. 7 Nebraska	31–7
77	November 13, 1982	Ames	No. 4 Nebraska	48–10
78	November 5, 1983	Lincoln	No. 1 Nebraska	72–29
79	November 3, 1984	Ames	No. 3 Nebraska	44–0
80	November 9, 1985	Lincoln	No. 3 Nebraska	49–0
81	November 8, 1986	Ames	No. 7 Nebraska	35–14
82	November 7, 1987	Lincoln	No. 2 Nebraska	42–3
83	November 5, 1988	Ames	No. 7 Nebraska	51–16
84	October 28, 1989	Lincoln	No. 4 Nebraska	49–17
85	October 27, 1990	Ames	No. 4 Nebraska	45–13
86	November 16, 1991	Lincoln	No. 11 Nebraska	38–13
87	November 14, 1992	Ames	Iowa State	19–10
88	November 13, 1993	Lincoln	No. 4 Nebraska	49–17
89	November 12, 1994	Ames	No. 1 Nebraska	28–12
90	November 4, 1995	Lincoln	No. 1 Nebraska	73–14
91	November 16, 1996	Ames	No. 5 Nebraska	49–14
92	November 15, 1997	Lincoln	No. 3 Nebraska	77–14
93	November 7, 1998	Ames	No. 14 Nebraska	42–7
94	October 9, 1999	Lincoln	No. 4 Nebraska	49–14
95	October 7, 2000	Ames	No. 2 Nebraska	49–27
96	October 6, 2001	Lincoln	No. 4 Nebraska	48–14
97	September 28, 2002	Ames	No. 19 Iowa State	36–14
98	October 25, 2003	Lincoln	No. 14 Nebraska	28–0
99	November 6, 2004	Ames	Iowa State	34–27
100	October 1, 2005	Lincoln	Nebraska	27–20^{2OT}
101	October 7, 2006	Ames	No. 22 Nebraska	28–14
102	September 29, 2007	Lincoln	No. 25 Nebraska	35–17
103	October 18, 2008	Ames	Nebraska	35–7
104	October 24, 2009	Lincoln	Iowa State	9–7
105	November 6, 2010	Ames	No. 9 Nebraska	31–30^{OT}
Series: Nebraska leads 86–17–2

== See also ==
- List of NCAA college football rivalry games
- List of most-played college football series in NCAA Division I
