= Clyde Williams Field =

Outdoor stadium at Iowa State University

- Interactive map of Clyde Williams Field
- Former names: State Field (1915–1938)
- Location: Sheldon Ave; Ames, IA 50011
- Coordinates: 42.024°N 93.653°W
- Owner: Iowa State University
- Operator: Iowa State University
- Capacity: 5,000 (1915–1924); 14,000 (1925–1929); 16,000 (1930–1931); 20,000 (1932–1960); 29,000 (1961–1965); 35,000 (1966–1974)

Construction
- Groundbreaking: 1914
- Opened: 1915
- Closed: 1975
- Demolished: June–November, 1978
- Cost: $32,000 (approx. original)

Tenants
- Iowa State football Iowa State track and field

Clyde Williams Field was an outdoor stadium on the campus of Iowa State University in Ames, Iowa. It was the home of the Iowa State Cyclones football and track and field teams.

It was originally built in 1914–15, just south of the recently completed State Gym. It originally held 5,000 spectators, but expansions in 1925, 1930, 1932, 1961 and 1966 brought the final capacity up to approximately 35,000. The stadium was the home of the Cyclones football team from its completion until 1975, when Jack Trice Stadium opened in the newly built Iowa State Center complex to the south of the main campus. Clyde Williams Field was razed in 1978. The site is now occupied by Eaton and Martin Halls, two residence halls constructed in 2002 and 2004, respectively.

The stadium was known as State Field until October 1938 when it was renamed for Clyde Williams, coach and athletic director at the school who died in March 1938.

== Football attendance ==
Year	Games	Total	Average
1928	3	12,922	4,307
1929	4	22,731	5,683
1930	3	13,576	4,525
1931	4	22,573	5,643
1932	5	13,412	2,682
1933	4	15,931	3,983
1934	5	35,744	7,149
1935	5	28,024	5,605
1936	5	27,045	5,409
1937	4	25,091	6,273
1938	4	55,322	13,831
1939	4	36,944	9,236
1940	4	31,608	7,902
1941	4	33,347	8,337
1942	4	24,525	6,131
1943	5	23,866	4,773
1944	5	25,591	5,118
1945	4	30,368	7,592
1946	4	44,745	11,186
1947	5	54,677	10,935
1948	6	68,014	11,336
1949	4	56,533	14,133
1950	5	71,534	14,307
1951	4	49,717	12,429
1952	5	50,488	10,098
1953	4	42,625	10,656
1954	5	51,108	10,222
1955	4	46,508	11,627
1956	4	44,086	11,022
1957	4	44,542	11,136
1958	5	52,282	10,456
1959	4	41,575	10,394
1960	4	63,619	15,905
1961	4	70,361	17,590
1962	5	85,982	17,196
1963	4	67,820	16,955
1964	4	81,192	20,298
1965	5	79,157	15,831
1966	4	93,465	23,366
1967	5	104,585	20,917
1968	5	122,261	24,452
1969	5	127,352	25,470
1970	4	110,185	27,537
1971	5	139,042	27,805
1972	5	166,106	33,221
1973	5	158,482	31,696
1974	5	162,456	32,419
