= List of TCU Horned Frogs football seasons =

The TCU Horned Frogs are an intercollegiate football team representing Texas Christian University (TCU) in the Division I Football Bowl Subdivision (FBS) of the National Collegiate Athletic Association (NCAA). The Horned Frogs have competed as a member of the Big 12 Conference since the 2012 college football season. TCU began playing football in 1896 and has played their home games since 1930 at Amon G. Carter Stadium on the TCU campus. Prior to the 2012 season, TCU was a member of the Southwest Conference (SWC) from 1923 to 1995, Western Athletic Conference (WAC) from 1996 to 2000, Conference USA (C-USA) from 2001 to 2004, and the Mountain West Conference (MWC) from 2005 to 2011.

This is a list of their annual results.

== Seasons ==
Year	Coach	Overall	Conference	Standing	Bowl/playoffs	Coaches^{#}	AP^{°}
Independent (1896)
1896	No coach	1–1–1					
Joe J. Field (Independent) (1897)
1897	Joe J. Field	3–1					
James Morrison (Independent) (1898)
1898	James Morrison	1–3–1					
1899	No coach	0–0–1					
1900	No team						
1901	No coach	1–2–1					
H. E. Hildebrand (Independent) (1902)
1902	H. E. Hildebrand	0–5–1					
1903	No coach	0–7					
C. E. Cronk (Independent) (1904)
1904	C. E. Cronk	1–4–1					
Emory J. Hyde (Independent) (1905–1907)
1905	Emory J. Hyde	4–4					
1906	Emory J. Hyde	2–5					
1907	Emory J. Hyde	4–2–2					
Jesse R. Langley (Independent) (1908)
1908	Jesse R. Langley	6–3					
Jesse R. Langley (TIAA) (1909)
1909	Jesse R. Langley	5–2–1	2–0				
Kemp Lewis (TIAA) (1910)
1910	Kemp Lewis	2–6–1	0–1				
Henry W. Lever (TIAA) (1911)
1911	Henry W. Lever	4–5	0–3				
Willis T. Stewart (TIAA) (1912)
1912	Willis T. Stewart	8–1	3–0				
Fred Cahoon (TIAA) (1913)
1913	Fred Cahoon	3–1–2	1–0				
Stanley A. Boles (TIAA) (1914)
1914	Stanley A. Boles	4–4–2	2–2				
Ewing Y. Freeland (TIAA) (1915)
1915	Ewing Y. Freeland	4–5	2–0				
Milton Daniel (TIAA) (1916–1917)
1916	Milton Daniel	6–2–1	3–0				
1917	Milton Daniel	8–2	2–0				
Ernest M. Tipton (TIAA) (1918)
1918	Ernest M. Tipton	4–3	2–0				
Ted D. Hackney (TIAA) (1919)
1919	Ted D. Hackney	1–7	1–4	9th			
William L. Driver (TIAA) (1920–1921)
1920	William L. Driver	9–1	3–0	1st	L Fort Worth Classic		
1921	William L. Driver	6–3–1	2–1	3rd			
John McKnight (TIAA) (1922)
1922	John McKnight	2–5–3	0–3–2	12th			
Matty Bell (Southwest Conference) (1923–1928)
1923	Matty Bell	4–5	2–1	3rd			
1924	Matty Bell	4–5	1–5	8th			
1925	Matty Bell	7–1–1	2–0–1	2nd			
1926	Matty Bell	6–1–2	1–1–2	4th			
1927	Matty Bell	4–3–2	1–2–2	5th			
1928	Matty Bell	8–2	3–2	T–3rd			
Francis Schmidt (Southwest Conference) (1929–1933)
1929	Francis Schmidt	9–0–1	4–0–1	1st			
1930	Francis Schmidt	9–2–1	4–2	3rd			
1931	Francis Schmidt	9–2–1	4–1–1	2nd			
1932	Francis Schmidt	10–0–1	6–0	1st			
1933	Francis Schmidt	9–2–1	4–2	2nd			
Dutch Meyer (Southwest Conference) (1934–1952)
1934	Dutch Meyer	8–4	3–3	4th			
1935	Dutch Meyer	12–1	5–1	2nd	W Sugar		
1936	Dutch Meyer	9–2–2	4–1–1	2nd	W Cotton		16
1937	Dutch Meyer	4–4–2	3–1–2	2nd			16
1938	Dutch Meyer	11–0	6–0	1st	W Sugar		1
1939	Dutch Meyer	3–7	1–5	6th			
1940	Dutch Meyer	3–7	2–4	5th			
1941	Dutch Meyer	7–3–1	4–1–1	T–2nd	L Orange		
1942	Dutch Meyer	7–3	4–2	3rd			
1943	Dutch Meyer	2–6	1–4	T–5th			
1944	Dutch Meyer	7–3–1	3–1–1	1st	L Cotton		
1945	Dutch Meyer	5–5	3–3	T–3rd			
1946	Dutch Meyer	2–7–1	2–4	T–5th			
1947	Dutch Meyer	4–5–2	2–3–1	4th	L Delta		
1948	Dutch Meyer	4–5–1	1–4–1	6th			
1949	Dutch Meyer	6–3–1	3–3	T–3rd			
1950	Dutch Meyer	5–5	3–3	T–3rd			
1951	Dutch Meyer	6–5	5–1	1st	L Cotton	11	10
1952	Dutch Meyer	4–4–2	2–2–2	4th			
Abe Martin (Southwest Conference) (1953–1966)
1953	Abe Martin	3–7	1–5	T–6th			
1954	Abe Martin	4–6	1–5	6th			
1955	Abe Martin	9–2	5–1	1st	L Cotton	6	6
1956	Abe Martin	8–3	5–1	2nd	W Cotton	14	14
1957	Abe Martin	5–4–1	2–4	T–5th			
1958	Abe Martin	8–2–1	5–1	1st	T Cotton	10	9
1959	Abe Martin	8–3	5–1	T–1st	L Bluebonnet	7	8
1960	Abe Martin	4–4–2	3–3–1	5th			
1961	Abe Martin	3–5–2	2–4–1	5th			
1962	Abe Martin	6–4	5–2	3rd			
1963	Abe Martin	4–5–1	2–4–1	5th			
1964	Abe Martin	4–6	3–4	6th			
1965	Abe Martin	6–5	5–2	T–2nd	L Sun		
1966	Abe Martin	2–8	2–5	T–6th			
Fred Taylor (Southwest Conference) (1967–1970)
1967	Fred Taylor	4–6	4–3	T–3rd			
1968	Fred Taylor	3–7	2–5	T–6th			
1969	Fred Taylor	4–6	4–3	T–3rd			
1970	Fred Taylor	4–6–1	3–4	T–4th			
Jim Pittman (Southwest Conference) (1971)
1971	Jim Pittman (Note: The team was coached by Jim Pittman, in his first and only year as head coach. Pittman died of a heart attack suffered on the sidelines of a game against Baylor in Waco, Texas on October 30, 1971. Assistant Coach Billy Tohill replaced Pittman as head coach for the remainder of the season, finishing with a 3–1 record.)	6–4–1	5–2	3rd			
Billy Tohill (Southwest Conference) (1971–1973)
1972	Billy Tohill	5–6	2–5	T–7th			
1973	Billy Tohill	3–8	1–6	7th			
Jim Shofner (Southwest Conference) (1974–1976)
1974	Jim Shofner	1–10	0–7	8th			
1975	Jim Shofner	1–10	1–6	T–7th			
1976	Jim Shofner	0–11	0–8	9th			
F. A. Dry (Southwest Conference) (1977–1982)
1977	F. A. Dry	2–9	1–7	8th			
1978	F. A. Dry	2–9	0–8	9th			
1979	F. A. Dry	2–8–1	1–6–1	8th			
1980	F. A. Dry	1–10	1–7	9th			
1981	F. A. Dry	2–7–2	1–6–1	8th			
1982	F. A. Dry	3–8	2–6	8th			
Jim Wacker (Southwest Conference) (1983–1991)
1983	Jim Wacker	1–8–2	1–6–1	8th			
1984	Jim Wacker	8–4	5–3	T–3rd	L Bluebonnet		
1985	Jim Wacker	3–8	0–8	9th			
1986	Jim Wacker	3–8	1–7	8th			
1987	Jim Wacker	5–6	3–4	T–4th			
1988	Jim Wacker	4–7	2–5	T–5th			
1989	Jim Wacker	4–7	2–6	T–7th			
1990	Jim Wacker	5–6	3–5	T–5th			
1991	Jim Wacker	7–4	4–4	T–5th			
Pat Sullivan (Southwest Conference) (1992–1995)
1992	Pat Sullivan	2–8–1	1–6	8th			
1993	Pat Sullivan	4–7	2–5	6th			
1994	Pat Sullivan	7–5	4–3	T–1st	L Independence		
1995	Pat Sullivan	6–5	3–4	5th			
Pat Sullivan (Western Athletic Conference) (1996–1997)
1996	Pat Sullivan	4–7	3–5	T–5th (Mountain)			
1997	Pat Sullivan	1–10	1–7	8th (Mountain)			
Dennis Franchione (Western Athletic Conference) (1998–2000)
1998	Dennis Franchione	7–5	4–4	T–5th (Mountain)	W Sun		
1999	Dennis Franchione	8–4	5–2	T–1st	W Mobile Alabama		
2000	Dennis Franchione (Note: The team was led by head coach Dennis Franchione throughout the regular season. Gary Patterson took over as interim head coach in December for the bowl game.)	10–2	7–1	T–1st	L Mobile Alabama	21	18
Gary Patterson (Conference USA) (2001–2004)
2001	Gary Patterson	6–6	4–3	T–5th	L Galleryfurniture.com		
2002	Gary Patterson	10–2	6–2	1st	W Liberty	23	22
2003	Gary Patterson	11–2	7–1	2nd	L Fort Worth	25	24
2004	Gary Patterson	5–6	3–5	T–6th			
Gary Patterson (Mountain West Conference) (2005–2011)
2005	Gary Patterson	11–1	8–0	1st	W Houston	11	9
2006	Gary Patterson	11–2	6–2	2nd	W Poinsettia	22	21
2007	Gary Patterson	8–5	4–4	5th	W Texas		
2008	Gary Patterson	11–2	7–1	2nd	W Poinsettia	7	7
2009	Gary Patterson	12–1	8–0	1st	L Fiesta^{†}	6	6
2010	Gary Patterson	13–0	8–0	1st	W Rose^{†}	2	2
2011	Gary Patterson	11–2	7–0	1st	W Poinsettia	14	13
Gary Patterson (Big 12 Conference) (2012–2021)
2012	Gary Patterson	7–6	4–5	T–5th	L Buffalo Wild Wings		
2013	Gary Patterson	4–8	2–7	T–7th			
2014	Gary Patterson	12–1	8–1	2nd	W Peach^{†}	3	3
2015	Gary Patterson	11–2	7–2	T–2nd	W Alamo	7	7
2016	Gary Patterson	6–7	4–5	5th	L Liberty		
2017	Gary Patterson	11–3	7–2	2nd	W Alamo	9	9
2018	Gary Patterson	7–6	4–5	T–5th	W Cheez–It		
2019	Gary Patterson	5–7	3–6	T–7th			
2020	Gary Patterson	6–4	5–4	5th	CX Texas (Note: The team was slated to face Arkansas in the Texas Bowl, but had to withdraw due to COVID-19 issues within the program.)		
2021	Gary Patterson (Note: The team was coached by 21st-year head coach Gary Patterson until he left the program after eight games. He was replaced by special assistant coach Jerry Kill on an interim basis.)	5–7	3–6	8th			
Sonny Dykes (Big 12 Conference) (2022–present)
2022	Sonny Dykes	13–2	9–0	2nd	W Fiesta^{†} (CFP Semifinal); L CFP NCG^{†}	2	2
2023	Sonny Dykes	5–7	3–6	T–9th			
2024	Sonny Dykes	9–4	6–3	T–5th	W New Mexico		
2025	Sonny Dykes	9–4	5-4	T–9th	W Alamo		25
Total:		688–571–57					
National championship Conference title Conference division title or championship game berth
^{†}Indicates Bowl Coalition, Bowl Alliance, BCS, or CFP / New Years' Six bowl.; ^{#}Rankings from final Coaches Poll.; ^{°}Rankings from final AP Poll.
