= List of TCU Horned Frogs head football coaches =

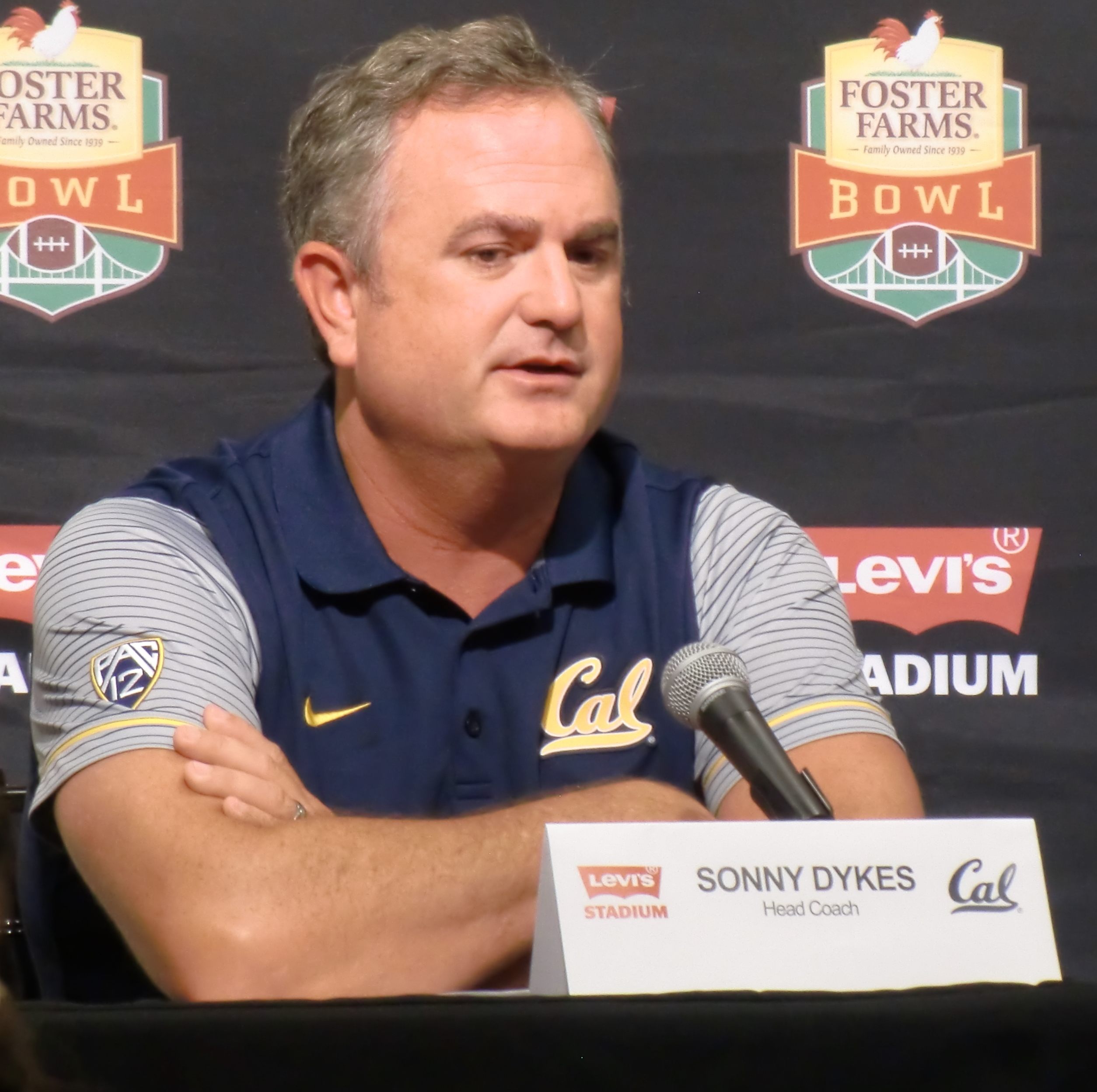
Sonny Dykes has served as head coach of the Horned Frogs since 2022.

The TCU Horned Frogs college football team represents Texas Christian University (TCU) in the Big 12 Conference (Big 12). The Horned Frogs compete as part of the NCAA Division I Football Bowl Subdivision. The program has had 31 head coaches, and one interim head coach, since it began play during the 1896 season. Since November 2021, Sonny Dykes has served as head coach at TCU.

Eight coaches have led TCU in postseason bowl games: William L. Driver, Dutch Meyer, Abe Martin, Jim Wacker, Pat Sullivan, Dennis Franchione, Gary Patterson, and Dykes. Seven of those coaches also won conference championships: Driver captured one as a member of the Texas Intercollegiate Athletic Association; Francis Schmidt captured two, Meyer three, Martin three, and Sullivan one as a member of the Southwest Conference; Franchione captured two as a member of the Western Athletic Conference; Patterson captured one as a member of Conference USA, four as a member of the Mountain West Conference, and one as a member of the Big 12 Conference.

Patterson is the leader in seasons coached with 21 years as head coach and games won with 181. Willis T. Stewart has the highest winning percentage at 0.889. Jim Shofner has the lowest winning percentage of those who have coached more than one game, with 0.061. Of the 31 different head coaches who have led the Horned Frogs, Matty Bell, Schmidt, Meyer, Sullivan, and Patterson have been inducted into the College Football Hall of Fame.

== Key ==
Key to symbols in coaches list
General		Overall		Conference		Postseason (Note: Although the first Rose Bowl Game was played in 1902, it has been continuously played since the 1916 game, and is recognized as the oldest bowl game by the NCAA. "—" indicates any season prior to 1916 when postseason games were not played.)	
No.	Order of coaches (Note: A running total of the number of head coaches, with coaches who served separate tenures being counted only once. Interim head coaches are represented with "Int" and are not counted in the running total. "—" indicates the team played but either without a coach or no coach is on record. "X" indicates an interim year without play.)	GC	Games coached	CW	Conference wins	PW	Postseason wins
DC	Division championships	OW	Overall wins	CL	Conference losses	PL	Postseason losses
CC	Conference championships	OL	Overall losses	CT	Conference ties	PT	Postseason ties
NC	National championships	OT	Overall ties (Note: Overtime rules in college football were introduced in 1996, making ties impossible in the period since.)	C%	Conference winning percentage		
†	Elected to the College Football Hall of Fame	O%	Overall winning percentage (Note: When computing the win–loss percentage, a tie counts as half a win and half a loss.)				

== Coaches ==
List of head football coaches showing season(s) coached, overall records, conference records, postseason records, championships and selected awards (Note: Statistics correct as of the end of the 2025 NCAA Division I FBS football season.)
No.	Name (Note: TCU did not have a head coach from their 1896, 1899, 1901, and 1903 seasons.)	Season(s) (Note: TCU did not field a team for the 1900 season.)	GC	OW	OL	OT	O%	CW	CL	CT	C%	PW	PL	PT	CC	NC	Awards
1	Joe J. Field	1897	4	3	1	0	0.750	—	—	—	—	—	—	—	—	—	—
2	James Morrison	1898	5	1	3	1	0.300	—	—	—	—	—	—	—	—	—	—
3	H. E. Hildebrand	1902	6	0	5	1	0.083	—	—	—	—	—	—	—	—	—	—
4	C. E. Cronk	1904	6	1	4	1	0.250	—	—	—	—	—	—	—	—	—	—
5	Emory J. Hyde	1905–1907	23	10	11	2	0.478	—	—	—	—	—	—	—	—	—	—
6	Jesse R. Langley	1908–1909	17	11	5	1	0.676	2	0	0	1.000	—	—	—	0	—	—
7	Kemp Lewis	1910	9	2	6	1	0.278	0	1	0	.000	—	—	—	0	—	—
8	Henry W. Lever	1911	9	4	5	0	0.444	0	3	0	.000	—	—	—	0	—	—
9	Willis T. Stewart	1912	9	8	1	0	0.889	3	0	0	1.000	—	—	—	0	—	—
10	Fred Cahoon	1913	8	5	2	1	0.688	—	—	—	—	—	—	—	—	—	—
11	Stanley A. Boles	1914	10	4	4	2	0.500	2	2	0	0.500	—	—	—	0	—	—
12	Ewing Y. Freeland	1915	9	4	5	0	0.444	2	0	0	1.000	—	—	—	0	—	—
13	Milton Daniel	1916–1917	19	14	4	1	0.763	5	0	0	1.000	—	—	—	0	—	—
14	Ernest M. Tipton	1918	7	4	3	0	0.571	2	0	0	1.000	—	—	—	0	—	—
15	Ted D. Hackney	1919	8	1	7	0	0.125	1	4	0	0.200	—	—	—	0	—	—
16	William L. Driver	1920–1921	19	14	4	1	0.763	5	1	0	0.833	0	1	0	1	—	—
17	John McKnight	1922	10	2	5	3	0.350	0	3	2	0.200	0	0	0	0	—	—
18	Matty Bell^{†}	1923–1928	55	33	17	5	0.645	10	11	5	0.481	0	0	0	0	—	—
19	Francis Schmidt^{†}	1929–1933	57	46	6	5	0.851	22	5	2	0.793	0	0	0	2	—	—
20	Dutch Meyer^{†}	1934–1952	201	109	79	13	0.575	57	46	9	0.549	3	4	0	3	2; 1935; 1938	—
21	Abe Martin	1953–1966	145	74	64	7	0.534	46	42	3	0.522	1	3	1	3	0	—
22	Fred Taylor	1967–1970	41	15	25	1	0.378	13	15	0	0.464	0	0	0	0	0	—
23	Jim Pittman	1971	7	3	3	1	0.500	2	1	0	0.667	0	0	0	0	0	—
24	Billy Tohill	1971–1973	26	11	15	0	0.423	6	7	0	0.462	0	0	0	0	0	—
25	Jim Shofner	1974–1976	33	2	31	0	0.061	1	21	0	0.045	0	0	0	0	0	—
26	F. A. Dry	1977–1982	66	12	51	3	0.205	6	40	2	0.146	0	0	0	0	0	—
27	Jim Wacker	1983–1991	100	40	58	2	0.410	21	48	1	0.307	0	1	0	0	0	—
28	Pat Sullivan^{†}	1992–1997	67	24	42	1	0.366	14	30	0	0.318	0	1	0	1	0	—
29	Dennis Franchione	1998–2000	35	25	10	—	0.714	16	7	—	0.696	2	0	—	2	0	—
30	Gary Patterson	2000–2021	260	181	79	—	0.696	113	59	—	0.657	11	6	—	6	0	AFCA COY (2009, 2014); AP COY (2009, 2014); Bobby Dodd COY (2009); Eddie Robinson COY (2009, 2014); George Munger Award (2009); Liberty Mutual COY (2009); Sporting News COY (2009, 2014); Walter Camp COY (2009, 2014); Home Depot COY (2014); Paul "Bear" Bryant Award (2014)
Int.	Jerry Kill	2021	4	2	2	—	0.500	2	2	—	0.500	0	0	—	0	0	—
31	Sonny Dykes	2022–present	53	36	17	—	0.679	23	13	—	0.639	3	1	—	0	0	AFCA COY (2022); AP COY (2022); Eddie Robinson COY (2022); Walter Camp COY (2022); Sporting News COY (2022); Home Depot COY (2022); Paul "Bear" Bryant Award (2022)
