= List of TCU Horned Frogs men's basketball head coaches =

The following is a list of TCU Horned Frogs men's basketball head coaches. The Horned Frogs have had 22 coaches. The team is currently coached by Jamie Dixon.

Tenure	Coach	Years	Wins	Losses	Pct.
1908–09	Jesse R. Langley	1	2	3	.400
1909–10	Oscar Wise	1	1	4	.200
1914–15	Fred Cahoon	1	11	12	.478
1915–16	Ewing Y. Freeland	1	1	3	.250
1919–20	Ted D. Hackney	1	1	7	.125
1920–22	William L. Driver	2	8	7	.533
1922–23	John McKnight	1	3	13	.188
1923–29	Matty Bell	6	71	41	.634
1929–34	Francis Schmidt	5	72	24	.750
1934–37	Dutch Meyer	3	10	37	.213
1937–41	Mike Brumbelow	4	22	64	.256
1941–48	Herb McQuillan	7	66	104	.388
1948–67	Buster Brannon	19	204	259	.441
1967–77	Johnny Swaim	10	102	151	.403
1977–79	Tim Somerville	2	10	43	.189
1979–87	Jim Killingsworth	8	130	106	.551
1987–94	Moe Iba	7	96	108	.471
1994–2002	Billy Tubbs	8	156	95	.622
2002–08	Neil Dougherty	6	75	108	.410
2008-12	Jim Christian	4	56	73	.434
2012–16	Trent Johnson	4	50	79	.388
2016-present	Jamie Dixon	8	172	120	.589
Totals	22 coaches	109 seasons	1319	1461	.474
