= Borradaile =

Borradaile may refer to:

== People ==
- Lancelot Alexander Borradaile (1872–1945), English zoologist
- Osmond Borradaile (1898–1999), Canadian cinematographer
- Oswell Borradaile (1859–1935), English cricketer
- Taylor A. Borradaile (1885–1977), American chemist
- William Borradaile (1792–1838), English cricketer

== Places ==
- Borradaile Island, one of the Balleny Islands near Antarctica
- Mount Borradaile, near Gunbalanya, Northern Territory, Australia
