= 1914 TCU football team =

American college football season

1914 TCU football
- Conference: Texas Intercollegiate Athletic Association
- Record: 4–4–2 (2–2 TIAA)
- Head coach: Stanley A. Boles (1st season)
- Captain: Crawford Reeder
- Home stadium: University gridiron, Panther Park

The 1914 TCU football team represented Texas Christian University (TCU) in the 1914 college football season. Led by Stanley A. Boles in his first and only year as head coach, TCU compiled an overall record of 4–4–2. The team's captain was Crawford Reeder, who played center. The Frogs played their home games in Fort Worth, Texas.

== Schedule ==
Date	Opponent	Site	Result	Source
September 26	North Texas State Normal*	University gridiron; Fort Worth, TX	W 40–0	
October 2	at Southwestern (TX)	Georgetown, TX	L 9–10	
October 10	Oklahoma School of Mines*	Morris Park; Fort Worth, TX	W 20–0	
October 16	at Texas A&M*	College Station, TX (rivalry)	L 0–40	
October 24	at Rice*	Rice Field; Houston, TX	T 0–0	
October 31	at Baylor*	Carroll Field; Waco, TX (rivalry)	L 14–28	
November 7	Austin	Fort Worth, TX	W 13–0	
November 14	at Daniel Baker	Brownwood, TX	L 0–33	
November 16	at Howard Payne	Brownwood, TX	W 14–0	
November 30	Trinity (TX)*	Panther Park; Fort Worth, TX	T 7–7	
*Non-conference game
