= 1917 TCU Horned Frogs football team =

American college football season

1917 TCU Horned Frogs football
- Conference: Texas Intercollegiate Athletic Association
- Record: 8–2 (2–0 TIAA)
- Head coach: Milton Daniel (2nd season)
- Captain: Ralph Martin
- Home stadium: TCU gridiron, Panther Park

The 1917 TCU Horned Frogs football team represented Texas Christian University (TCU) as a member of the Texas Intercollegiate Athletic Association (TIAA) during the 1917 college football season. Led by Milton Daniel in his second and final year as head coach, the Horned Frogs compiled an overall record of 8–2. The team's captain was Ralph Martin, who played halfback.

== Schedule ==
Date	Time	Opponent	Site	Result	Source
September 29	4:00 p.m.	Meridian College*	Fort Worth, TX	W 20–0	
October 6		1st Texas Artillery*	TCU gridiron; Fort Worth, TX	W 20–7	
October 13	3:00 p.m.	at Rice*	Rice Field; Houston, TX	L 0–26	
October 20	3:00 p.m.	SMU*	TCU gridiron; Fort Worth, TX (rivalry)	W 21–0	
October 27		at Trinity (TX)*	Waxahachie, TX	W 20–6	
November 2	3:30 p.m.	Southwestern (TX)	TCU gridiron; Fort Worth, TX	W 20–6	
November 10		141st Infantry*	Panther Park; Fort Worth, TX	L 7–14	
November 16		at Austin	Sherman, TX	W 59–0	
November 24		at 111th Ambulance*		W 6–0	
November 29		Baylor*	TCU gridiron; Fort Worth, TX (rivalry)	W 34–0	
*Non-conference game
