= Dwight I. Douglass =

American fraternity founder (1884–1940)

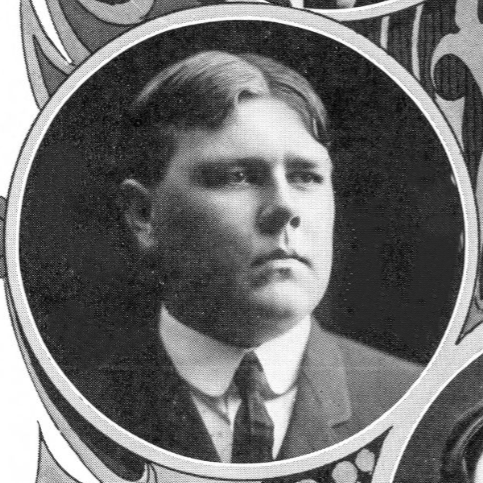
- Miami University, 1905
- Born: Dwight Ireneus Douglass; June 6, 1884; Colfax, Illinois, US
- Died: February 12, 1940 (aged 55); Hammond, Louisiana, US
- Resting place: Hammond, Louisiana
- Education: Ohio Wesleyan University; Miami University; Colorado School of Mines
- Occupations: Engineer and clerk
- Employer(s): Springfield Chemical Engine Company; Veteran's Administration
- Known for: Founding Phi Kappa Tau fraternity

Dwight Ireneus Douglass (June 6, 1884 – February 12, 1940) was an American engineer, short story writer, and fraternity founder. He was one of four students who established Phi Kappa Tau fraternity at Miami University in 1906.

== Early life ==
Douglass was born in Colfax, Illinois on June 6, 1884. He was the son Mary Louisa (née Pierson) and David Theodore Douglass, a physician. He had three siblings, Donald P. Douglass, Miriam Douglass, and Emily Douglass. Their father died in 1900.

Douglass graduated from Colfax High School in June 1902. In May of that year, he participated in the second annual literary and musical contest of the Schools of McLean County, giving an oration entitled "Seeming Difficulties Are Real Helps to Success." He also represented his high school at the district competition and was an orator for the Colfax High graduation. He was elected vice president of the Epworth League of the Methodist Episcopal Church of Colfax in 1902.

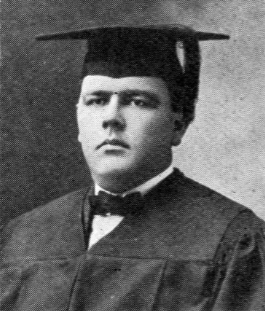
Douglass, Miami University, 1906

Douglass attended Ohio Wesleyan University from 1902 to 1904. He transferred to Miami University in September 1904 to study chemistry. He played football for Miami his junior year, as right guard and center. He was six feet two and two hundred pounds and "cut an imposing figure, reputedly the largest man in the 202-member student body." He was also a member of the "M" Association, the Golf Club, the Tennis Club, and the campus Y.M.C.A. He served on the three-person Athletic Board of Control and was the presiding judge of the mock North Dorm Senate.

In early 1905, Douglass and senior Arthur Harrison attempted to create an anti-fraternity association to give a voice on campus to students who were not members of Greek letter organizations. Douglass wrote articles about their idea for the student union's Side Lights. Harrison graduated before the two were successful, but Douglass returned the next year still committed to his idea. He convened the first meeting of the Non-Fraternity Association on March 17, 1906. Douglass and a friend drafted the association's constitution during spring break later that month, notoriously helping himself to a dean's office and cigars in the process. The Non-Fraternity Association became Phrenocon (Friends, Non-Fraternity, and Comrades) in March 1909 and Phi Kappa Tau fraternity in March 1916.

Douglas graduated from Miami University in 1906 with a A.B. He then received a degree in mining engineering from the Colorado School of Mines.

== Career ==
After college, Douglass worked as a mining engineer and prospector based in Colfax. In 1907, he worked as an assistant engineer for the Springfield Chemical Engine Company of Springfield, Illinois. In 1909, he was working in Dahlonega, Georgia.

Douglass enlisted for World War I on April 25, 1918. He served as a private, then sergeant, with Company C of the 27th Engineer Battalion. He participated in the Battle of Belleau Wood, Battle of Château-Thierry, and the Meuse–Argonne offensive. He was gassed during a battle, leaving him with a cough. He was discharged from the military on April 4, 1919, and returned to Colfax.

After the war, Douglass attempted farming in southeast Missouri. Next, he worked for the Veterans Administration for fifteen years, first at the U. S. Veteran's Hospital in New Orleans from 1922 to 1925 and, then, in Aspinwall, Pennsylvania starting in 1925. He retired early because of his declining health. In his retirement, he wrote and sold short stories under a pen name.

== Personal life ==
He became a member of the Sons of the American Revolution in 1912. After college, he continued to be involved in the Non-Fraternity Association after graduation, returning for reunions and attending the group's first national convention in Chicago in December 1917. He purchased an 160 acres (65 ha) farm in Mississippi County, Missouri on February 10, 1921. However, the farm went into foreclosure and was sold on April 8, 1922, because Douglass failed to make payments on the interest of his loan.

In February 1922, Douglass disappeared and his fraternity and family were unable to locate him. Finally, his family had him declared dead. Far from deceased, he finally contacted his family in 1930. He had moved to New Orleans in 1922 and to Aspinwall, Pennsylvania in 1924, where he worked for the Veterans Administration hospital. While working in New Orleans hospital, he met nurse Ruth Marie Matthews of Hammond, Louisiana; she also transferred to Pittsburgh to be with him. They married in Pittsburgh, Pennsylvania on March 17, 1934, the anniversary of the founding of Phi Kappa Tau. They had a son, Donald Dwight Douglass, in January 1935.

After Douglass retired, the family moved to Hammond, where they were members of the First Methodist Church. After an extended illness, Douglass died on February 12, 1940, at the home of Minnie Matthews in Hammond. He was buried in Greenlawn Cemetery in Hammond.

== Honors ==
Phi Kappa Tau named its Dwight I. Douglas President Award in his honor.
