= 1917 SMU Mustangs football team =

American college football season

1917 SMU Mustangs football
- Conference: Texas Intercollegiate Athletic Association
- Record: 3–2–3 ( TIAA)
- Head coach: J. Burton Rix (1st season)
- Captain: Douglas I. Maxwell

The 1917 SMU Mustangs football team was an American football team that represented Southern Methodist University (SMU) as a member of the Texas Intercollegiate Athletic Association (TIAA) during the 1917 college football season. In its first season under head coach J. Burton Rix, the team compiled an overall record of 3–2–3 and outscored opponents by a total of 74 to 49. The team played its home games at Armstrong Field in University Park, Texas.

== Schedule ==
Date	Time	Opponent	Site	Result	Source
October 6		Meridian College	Armstrong Field; Dallas, TX	W 20–7	
October 13		at Austin	Sherman, TX	W 20–0	
October 20	3:00 p.m.	at TCU	TCU gridiron; Fort Worth, TX	L 0–21	
October 27		Dallas	Armstrong Field; Dallas, TX	T 7–7	
November 3		Trinity (TX)	Armstrong Field; Dallas, TX	W 20–0	
November 10		Howard Payne	Armstrong Field; Dallas, TX	L 7–14	
November 17		Baylor	Armstrong Field; Dallas, TX	T 0–0	
November 29		Southwestern (TX)	Armstrong Field; Dallas, TX	T 0–0	
All times are in Central time
