= Ewing T. Boles =

American banker (1895–1992)

Ewing Thomas Boles (May 4, 1895 – November 16, 1992) was an American investment banker and philanthropist who served as president, CEO and chairman of the Ohio Company (now merged with Fifth Third Bank).

== Biography ==
Boles was born on a farm outside of Williamstown, Kentucky on May 4, 1895.

He attended Centre College in Danville, Kentucky where he played football, studied economics and English and graduated in 1916. He became a member of a local organization called Zenophilia which became the fourth chapter of a growing national organization known as Phrenocon. That organization, which would again change its name to Phi Kappa Tau in 1916, became a major focus of Boles' volunteer work for the rest of his life.

Boles entered the University of Kentucky Law School but gave that up to enter the United States Navy during World War I. Boles worked in Chicago after the war, and held other positions before joining BancOhio Securities Company (later the Ohio Company) at Columbus, Ohio in 1929. He was named its president in 1935 and continued in that capacity until his retirement in 1965. He enjoyed considerable success in business, serving on the board of directors for some 15 companies. He was president of the Investment Bankers Association, 1952–53, and active in community service organizations.

He died on November 16, 1992.

== Philanthropic activity ==
Boles' two major philanthropic interests were Centre College and Phi Kappa Tau Fraternity and its educational foundation. He was national president of the fraternity in 1916-17 and was the founder of the Phi Kappa Tau Foundation in 1950. He served as president of the Foundation and later as chairman of the board. In 1982, he spurred a capital campaign for the Foundation with a challenge gift of $1-million which was the largest gift ever given to a college fraternity or sorority foundation up until that time. He was the only person ever to be named an honorary founder of Phi Kappa Tau. In recognition of his lifelong commitment to the fraternity, he received the North American Interfraternity Conference gold medal in 1985.

At Centre College, he served for many years as a member of the board and was chair for five years in the 1960s. At the college, both Boles Hall and the Boles Natatorium are named for him, as are endowed professorships in history and in economics.

At his death, he left multimillion-dollar bequests to the Phi Kappa Tau Foundation and to Centre College.

His older brother, Stanley A. Boles was a coach and athletic director at the University of Kentucky.
