= Phi Tau (disambiguation) =

Phi Tau is a local, coeducational fraternity at Dartmouth College.

Phi Tau may also refer to:

- Phi Tau, a commonly used nickname for Phi Kappa Tau, a male-only college fraternity
- Phi Tauri (often shortened to Phi Tau), a red giant binary star telescope
