= Phi Kappa Tau =

North American collegiate fraternity

- ΦΚΤ
- Founded: March 17, 1906; 120 years ago Miami University
- Type: Social
- Affiliation: NIC
- Status: Active
- Scope: National (US)
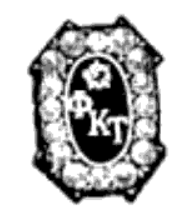
- Member badge
- Colors: Core: Supporting:
- Symbol: Shield
- Flag
- Flower: Red carnation
- Publication: The Laurel of Phi Kappa Tau
- Philanthropy: SeriousFun Children's Network
- Chapters: 161 Chartered, 83 Active, 7 Associate chapters
- Members: 3,900 active 101,000 lifetime
- Nickname: Phi Tau
- Headquarters: 5221 Morning Sun Road; Oxford, Ohio 45056; United States
- Website: www.phikappatau.org

Phi Kappa Tau (ΦΚΤ), commonly known as Phi Tau (/faɪ tɔː/), is a collegiate fraternity located in the United States. The fraternity was founded in 1906. As of May 2024, the fraternity has 161 chartered chapters, 83 active chapters, 7 associate chapters, and about 3,900 collegiate members. SeriousFun Children's Network, founded by Beta chapter alumnus Paul Newman, is Phi Kappa Tau's National Philanthropy. According to its Constitution, Phi Kappa Tau is one of the few social fraternities that accepts both graduate students and undergraduates.

== History ==
Phi Kappa Tau fraternity (commonly called Phi Tau) was founded in the Union Literary Society Hall of Miami University's Old Main Building in Oxford, Ohio on March 17, 1906. The four founders were Taylor A. Borradaile, Clinton D. Boyd, Dwight I. Douglass, and William H. Shideler.

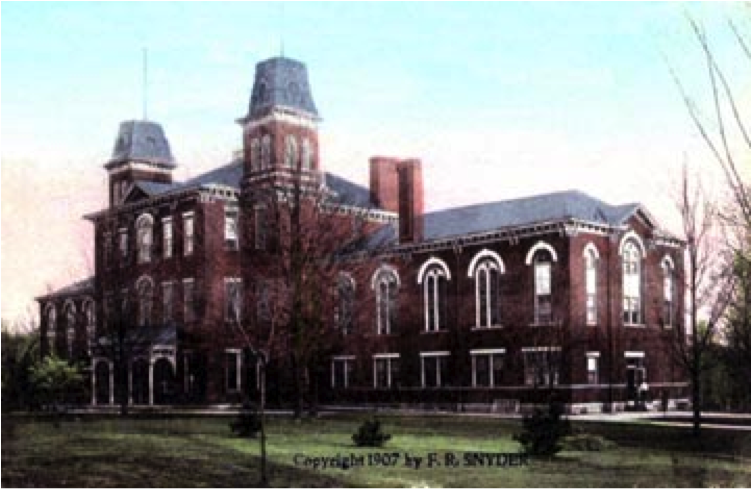
Old Main at Miami University, Phi Kappa Tau's founding site

The fraternity was founded as The Non-Fraternity Association, to give Miami's non-fraternity men a voice in campus political affairs. The name was changed to Phrenocon on March 6, 1909. The two proposed names were the "Miami Friends" and the "Miami Comrades", which were combined to form "Frenocom". "Phrenocon" was an alternate spelling of "Frenocom", the idea being to make the name sound more Greek.

Phrenocon became "national" in 1911 when an organization of independent men known as the Ohio University Union chose to form the Ohio University chapter of Phrenocon. Additional Phrenocon chapters were established at Ohio State University, Centre College, Mount Union College, and the University of Illinois. At Miami, Phrenocon began to have difficulty retaining members by the early 1910s. Often, men would join Phrenocon, but later withdraw their membership and join Greek-letter fraternities. In fact, the Miami chapters of Delta Tau Delta and Sigma Alpha Epsilon were founded by Phrenocon members. For that reason, the Miami chapter withdrew from the National Phrenocon and adopted the name Phi Kappa Tau in 1913. Since 1919, Phi Kappa Tau has published a magazine, The Laurel. Previously, the magazine was known as Sidelights. The rest of the chapters agreed to the name change on December 21 of that year and invited Miami to return to the national organization as the Alpha chapter of Phi Kappa Tau. Eta chapter at Muhlenberg College was the first chapter to charter after the change to Phi Kappa Tau. As part of their risk management policy, Phi Kappa Tau prohibits chapters from engaging in hazing and underage drinking. Phi Kappa Tau is committed to ensuring the well-being and safety of its members by implementing measures that prioritize their welfare and promote a positive and supportive environment. The fraternity recognizes a National Hazing Prevention Week in late September.

Phi Kappa Tau has been a member since 1916 of the North American Interfraternity Conference (NIC), a consortium of national men's social fraternities.

== Phi Kappa Tau Foundation ==
The Phi Kappa Tau Foundation was created in 1945 as a separate charitable organization. The Foundation's significant expansion began in 1983 with the announcement of a challenge gift of over $1 million from Ewing T. Boles, a member of fraternity's Delta chapter at Centre College. The Boles gift was the largest gift to a fraternity or sorority foundation up until that time and became the lead gift in a $3.2-million capital campaign. That same year Boles was named an Honorary Founder by Phi Kappa Tau. Boles left an additional bequest of over $3 million to the Foundation upon his death. Its current assets exceed $15 million.

== Organization and leadership ==
Phi Kappa Tau chapters consist of Resident Councils, comprising current collegiate members, and Graduate Councils, which include all alumni or those who have departed from their educational institutions. Each chapter council is granted a vote at the National Convention, the fraternity's supreme governing body that convenes biennially. This convention is responsible for electing the National Council, which acts as the fraternity's board of directors and oversees its governance in the intervals between conventions.

Executive offices of the Phi Kappa Tau Fraternity and Foundation are in Oxford, Ohio. Michael Lummus (Belmont University) is national president and Douglas C. Adams (Miami University) is chair of the Phi Kappa Tau Foundation.

== Chapters ==
As of May 2024, Phi Kappa Tau reports chartering 161 chapters since its founding, with 83 active chapters and 7 Associate chapters.

== Controversies ==
In 2003, Bradley University student Robert Schmalz, age 22, died from alcohol poisoning during a rush week event. The event happened shortly before the university received a national award for its efforts to reduce alcohol abuse.

In November 2006, the Phi Kappa Tau Upsilon chapter at Nebraska Wesleyan University experienced the death of Ryan Stewart, age 19, and the critical injury of three other students in an early morning house fire. The fraternity's national officers imposed a four year suspension on the chapter after the citation of three chapter members for hazing unrelated to the house fire and the arrest of the chapter's rush president for an incident of attempted first-degree arson occurring the same night as the house fire, but, according to the Lincoln Police Department, unrelated to the house fire itself. Eyewitnesses reported fireworks being lit off earlier that morning, with investigators later finding several fireworks prohibited by University code, and of a type illegal in the state of Nebraska, in and around the house. Investigators also found marijuana, glass pipes, and items covered in blood in the house. The student-body president of the university, a chapter member, repudiated the disciplinary action undertaken by the University and the fraternity's National Convention by noting how the chapter, "[felt] betrayed by our university and by our national council." He added that charges filed by Lincoln Police Department against three of the chapter's members were “completely bogus." The house was renovated and members moved back in the house after a six year gap in a charter from the National Convention and a lack of University recognition. This incident caused sprinklers to be installed in every building affiliated with the University and alcohol to be prohibited from university-recognized Greek housing.

In 2007, Gary DeVercelly Jr., age 18, died from alcohol poisoning while pledging the fraternity at Rider University. The chapter was dissolved, and three students were indicted in the death with one receiving three years' probation. Atypically, two university officials were also indicted, although charges against the officials were later dropped.

In 2012, the College of William & Mary suspended Phi Kappa Tau for three years due to a repeated history of hazing, culminating in an incident when something was stolen from Colonial Williamsburg during a scavenger hunt held for new recruits.

In October 2013, the Phi Kappa Tau chapter at the Georgia Institute of Technology was suspended after an email from one member to other members titled "Luring your rapebait." While the email's author subsequently released an apology, the chapter was suspended by the school's Office of Student Integrity until 2017 after a university investigation concluded that the chapter engaged in a "pattern of sexual violence that suggests a deep-rooted culture within the fraternity that is obscene, indecent and endangers women." A lawsuit was filed in 2014 against the national and local chapter by two plaintiffs who claim they were raped by a fraternity member. The suit states that the alleged rapist has been expelled from Georgia Tech.

In 2016, the Miami University suspended the fraternity for at least four years for forcing pledges to participate in abusive workouts, be held overnight against their will, and act as servants by cleaning members' rooms and writing their papers for them. Phi Kappa Tau's Miami chapter had been previously suspended for a fireworks battle with neighboring Sigma Alpha Epsilon in 2012 which led to police discovering drugs and drug paraphernalia in the groups' houses.

== Further information ==
- Anson, Jack L., The Golden Jubilee History of Phi Kappa Tau, Lawhead Press, Athens Ohio: 1957
- Ball, Charles T., From Old Main to a New Century: A History of Phi Kappa Tau, Heritage Publishers, Phoenix: 1996 ISBN 0-929690-29-X
