= William Borradaile =

English cricketer

William Borradaile (10 July 1792 – 16 March 1838) was an English amateur cricketer who played from 1815 to 1832. Mainly associated with Marylebone Cricket Club (MCC), he made 3 known appearances in important matches. He played for the Gentlemen in the 1832 Gentlemen v Players match.

== Bibliography ==
- Haygarth, Arthur (1996) [1862]. Scores & Biographies, Volume 1 (1744–1826). Kennington: Frederick Lillywhite. ISBN 978-19-00592-23-9.
- Haygarth, Arthur (1997) [1862]. Scores & Biographies, Volume 2 (1827–1840). Kennington: Frederick Lillywhite. ISBN 978-19-00592-23-9.
