= Taylor A. Borradaile =

American chemist and fraternity founder (1885–1977)

- Born: Taylor Albert Borradaile; May 15, 1885; Preble County, Ohio, US
- Died: June 25, 1977 (aged 92); Beckley, West Virginia, US
- Burial place: Sunset Memorial Park, Beckley, West Virginia
- Education: Miami University
- Occupation: Chemist
- Known for: Founder of Phi Kappa Tau

Taylor Albert Borradaile (May 15, 1885 – June 25, 1977) was an American chemist and one of four founders, and the first president, of Phi Kappa Tau fraternity.

== Early life ==
Taylor Albert Borradaile was born near Camden, Ohio on May 15, 1885, into a prominent local Quaker family. He went to the Miami University to study science. While there, he was a member of the Erodelphian Literary Society. He also became affiliated with several non-fraternity men who were attempting to overcome the political alliances of the campus fraternity men who dominated athletics, student government, and other activities. He became the first president of the Non-Fraternity Association founded on March 17, 1906. This organization evolved into Phi Kappa Tau fraternity which today has more than 90,000 members in chapters across the United States.

== Career ==
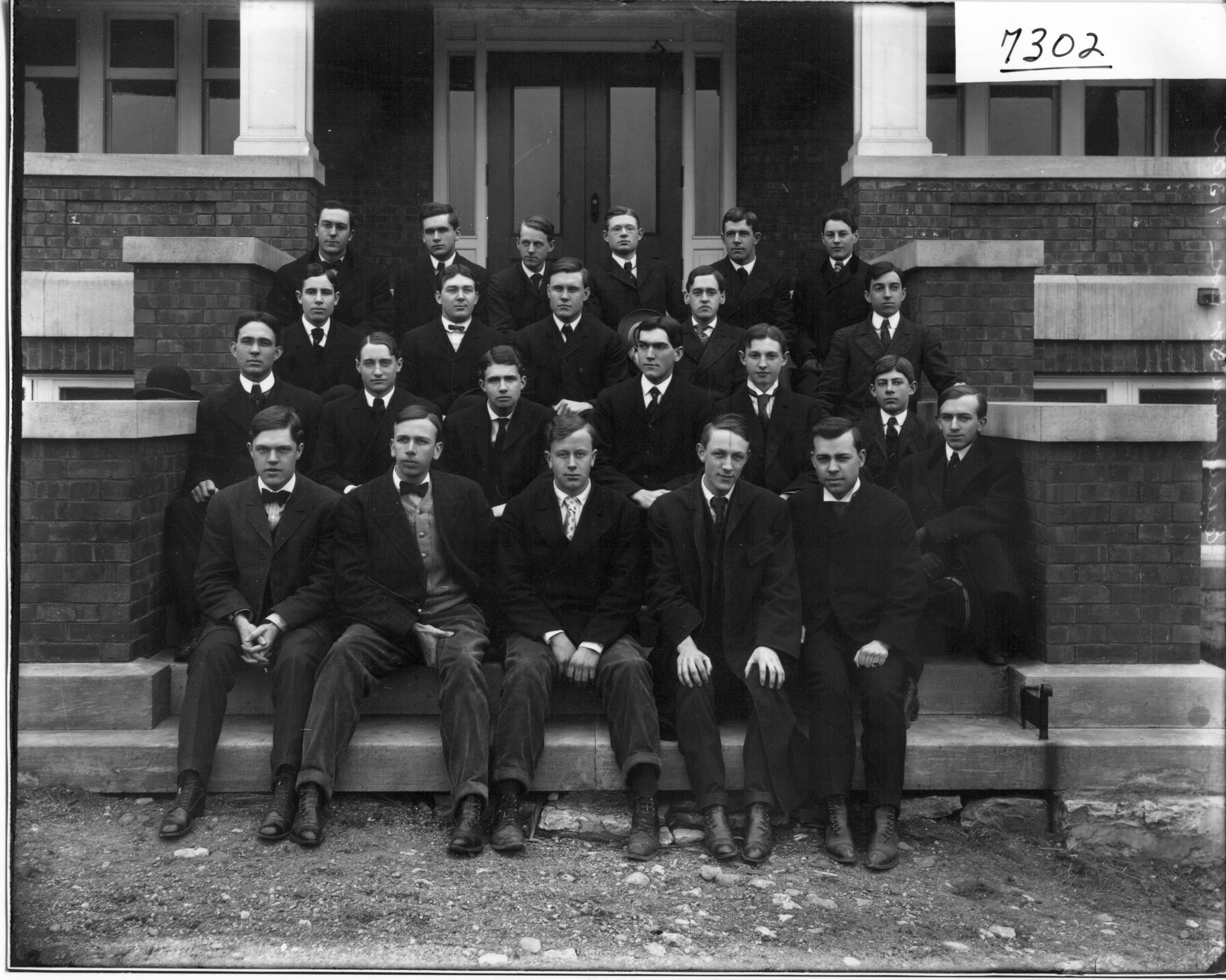
Miami University Erodelphian Literary Society, 1906. Borradaile is second from left in back row

Borradaile began his career as a teacher in Tipp City, Ohio and later became involved in chemical sales in Florida, where he also studied law and was admitted to the Florida bar, without attending law school. In later years, he was a chemist in government service in Charleston, West Virginia.

He was an expert on poisons and was regularly hired as an expert witness in trials involving poisons. He received two patents, one for a "process for the separation of magnesium chloride from calcium chloride" and a second for a "method of making ammonium chloride and calcium sulphate".

He retired from the Veterans Administration in Washington, D. C. as a chemist.

== Personal life ==
Borradaile married Anna Laura Reeve with whom he had one child, Joseph Reeve Borradaile. He divorced his first wife in 1936 and married Letha Mandanna Lively the following year.

Borradaile was not involved in the fraternity he founded for the early part of his life and did not attend a national convention of the fraternity until 1951, though he attended every convention from that time until his death.

He died in 1977 in Beckley, West Virginia. He was interred next to his wife Letha in the Sunset Memorial Park in Beckley.

== Legacy ==
He was the longest-living of the fraternity's four founders, outliving William H. Shideler by nearly 20 years. Two of the fraternity's most significant awards are named for him.
