= 1911 TCU football team =

American college football season

1911 TCU football
- Conference: Texas Intercollegiate Athletic Association
- Record: 4–5 (0–3 TIAA)
- Head coach: Henry W. Lever (1st season)
- Home stadium: Morris Park

The 1911 TCU football team represented Texas Christian University (TCU) as a member of the Texas Intercollegiate Athletic Association (TIAA) during the 1911 college football season. Led by Henry W. Lever in his first and only year as head coach, TCU compiled an overall record of 4–5. They played their home games at Morris Park in Fort Worth, Texas.

A game with Texas scheduled for October 7 was cancelled following the death of Billy Wasmund, the Longhorns's head coach.

== Schedule ==
Date	Time	Opponent	Site	Result	Attendance	Source
September 29		FW Central High*	Fort Worth, TX	W 24–0		
October 14		Trinity (TX)*	Morris Park; Fort Worth, TX	W 30–0		
October 21		at Southwestern (TX)	Georgetown, TX	L 0–21		
October 28		at Austin	Sherman, TX	L 0–39		
November 8		at Southwestern Normal (OK)*	Weatherford, OK	W 25–0		
November 11		at Baylor*	Waco, TX (rivalry)	L 0–12		
November 15		Southwestern Normal (OK)*	Varsity gridiron; Fort Worth, TX	W 24–0		
November 18		Austin	Morris Park; Fort Worth, TX	L 8–18	800	
November 30	3:30 p.m.	Polytechnic (TX)*	Morris Park; Fort Worth, TX	L 3–16	2,000	
*Non-conference game
