= Milton Daniel =

American independent oil operator, college football player and coach

Biographical details
- Born: October 6, 1890; Farmerville, Louisiana, U.S.
- Died: April 16, 1958 (aged 67); Breckenridge, Texas, U.S.

Playing career

Football
- 1908–1911: TCU
- 1913: Texas

Baseball
- 1908–1909: TCU
- 1911–1912: TCU
- Position: Fullback (football)

Coaching career (HC unless noted)
- 1916–1917: TCU

Head coaching record
- Overall: 14–4–1

Accomplishments and honors

Championships
- 1913 TIAA Championship (player)

Milton Enoch Daniel (October 6, 1890 – April 16, 1958) was an American independent oil operator, college football player and coach, and an important figure in the history of Texas Christian University (TCU). He played football at TCU, from 1908 to 1911, and one season at the University of Texas at Austin, in 1913. In 1916, he returned to TCU to serve as the head football coach for two seasons, from 1916 to 1917, compiling a record of 14–4–1. He was a generous donor to the university and served as the chairmen of its board of directors until his retirement in 1957. Milton Daniel Hall on the TCU campus is named in his honor, as is the Daniel-Meyer Athletic Complex.

== Early life, education, and playing career ==
Daniel was born on October 6, 1890, in Farmerville, Louisiana. He was the fourth son of Lawrence C. Daniel and Sarah Ada Burk. His father died when he was 2 or 3 years old. At the age of four, Daniel moved with this family to Waco, Texas. Following the death of his mother when he was 10, Daniel and two brothers spent a short time in a Methodist orphanage before coming under the guardianship of a cousin, E. E. Cammack, in Waco.

When Daniel was 16, he left for Texas Christian University (TCU) for prep school and then enrolled in the college in 1908. He lettered four times in both football and baseball at TCU, captaining the 1911 TCU Horned Frogs football team. In 1912, Daniel moved on to the University of Texas at Austin, where he lettered for the Texas Longhorns football team in 1913 and earned a Bachelor of Laws degree.

== Head coaching record ==
Daniel was admitted to the bar in 1915 and became a law professor and the football coach the next year.

Year	Team	Overall	Conference	Standing	Bowl/playoffs
TCU Horned Frogs (Texas Intercollegiate Athletic Association) (1916–1917)
1916	TCU	6–2–1	3–0		
1917	TCU	8–2	2–0		
TCU:		14–4–1	5–0		
Total:		14–4–1			

== Later life ==
In 1917 he left TCU for the Army during World War II, first as a Captain in the National Guard. But he resigned and reenlisted as a private, reaching the rank of second lieutenant before leaving the service in 1918.

He moved to Breckinridge in 1919 and he took a job as private secretary and attorney for First National Bank in Breckenridge. He became a director of the bank in 1923. He became the bank president on 25 April 1929. He was named a director of Fort Worth's First National Bank in 1944. He got involved in cattle, ranching, business and was an owner of the Ford agency in Breckenridge. He was director of Denison & Pacific Railway Co. and the first president of the West Central Texas Municipal Water District, a post he resigned on 1 July 1957, due to failing health. He was a noted philanthropist and served as chairman of the board of TCU. Mr. Daniel was vice president and director of the Brazos River Authority for 20 years. He was responsible for building Lake Daniel, the city's water supply for Breckenridge. He was active in the construction of the First Christian Church of Breckenridge which he had belonged to since 1953.

In 1936 he was voted TCU's most valuable alumnus and in 1945 he was given an honorary law degree from the university.

== Legacy ==
Daniel-Meyer Coliseum, built in 1962, on the TCU campus was named (and then renamed in 2015) for him as is Milton Daniel Hall at TCU and Lake Daniel in Breckenridge, Texas.
