= 1920 TCU Horned Frogs football team =

American college football season

1920 TCU Horned Frogs football

TIAA champion

Fort Worth Classic, L 7–63 vs. Centre
- Conference: Texas Intercollegiate Athletic Association
- Record: 9–1 (3–0 TIAA)
- Head coach: William L. Driver (1st season)
- Captain: Astyanax Douglass
- Home stadium: Clarke Field, Panther Park

The 1920 TCU Horned Frogs football team represented Texas Christian University (TCU) as a member of the Texas Intercollegiate Athletic Association (TIAA) during the 1920 college football season. Led by first-year head coach William L. Driver, the Frogs compiled an overall record of 9–1 with a conference mark of 3–0, winning the TIAA title. TCU hosted Centre on New Year's Day in the Fort Worth Classic, losing by a score of 63 to 7. The team's captain was Astyanax Douglass, who played center.

== Schedule ==
Date	Time	Opponent	Site	Result	Attendance	Source
October 2		Southeastern Normal (OK)*	Clarke Field; Fort Worth, TX	W 20–0		
October 9		Austin	Clarke Field; Fort Worth, TX	W 9–7		
October 16		at Arkansas*	The Hill; Fayetteville, AR	W 19–2		
October 23		at Trinity (TX)*	Waxahachie, TX	W 20–7		
October 30	3:00 p.m.	Phillips*	Panther Park; Fort Worth, TX	W 3–0		
November 6		Kirksville Osteopaths*	Panther Park; Fort Worth, TX	W 13–3	2,500	
November 13		at Baylor*	Cotton Palace; Waco, TX (rivalry)	W 21–9		
November 19		Simmons (TX)	Panther Park; Fort Worth, TX	W 31–2		
November 25	3:00 p.m.	Southwestern (TX)	Panther Park; Fort Worth, TX	W 21–16		
January 1, 1921		Centre*	Panther Park; Fort Worth, TX (Fort Worth Classic)	L 7–63	7,000	
*Non-conference game; All times are in Central time
