= Ernest M. Tipton =

American judge

Biographical details
- Born: January 2, 1889; Bowling Green, Missouri, U.S.
- Died: February 25, 1955 (aged 66); Kansas City, Missouri, U.S.

Playing career

Track
- 1910–1911: Missouri
- Position: Half-miler

Coaching career (HC unless noted)

Football
- 1911–1912: Westminster (MO)
- 1918: TCU
- 1919: East Texas State

Basketball
- 1919–1920: East Texas State

Administrative career (AD unless noted)
- 1918–?: TCU

Head coaching record
- Overall: 2–3 (basketball)

Ernest Moss Tipton (January 2, 1889 – February 25, 1955) was an American judge and college sports coach. He served on the Supreme Court of Missouri for 22 years, from 1933 until his death in 1955. Tipton was the head football coach at Westminster College in Fulton, Missouri from 1911 to 1912, Texas Christian University (TCU) in 1918, and East Texas State Normal College—now known as East Texas A&M University—in 1919. He was also the head basketball coach at East Texas State for one season, in 1919–20.

Tipton was born on January 2, 1889, in Bowling Green, Missouri. He attended the University of Missouri, where ran track and graduated with the law class of 1911. In 1932, Tipton was elected to succeeded Berryman Henwood on the Missouri high court, taking office in 1933. He died on February 25, 1955, in Kansas City, Missouri.

== Head coaching record ==
=== Football ===
Year	Team	Overall	Conference	Standing	Bowl/playoffs
Westminster Blue Jays (Independent) (1911–1912)
1911	Westminster				
1912	Westminster				
Westminster:					
TCU Horned Frogs (Texas Intercollegiate Athletic Association) (1918)
1918	TCU	4–3	2–0		
TCU:		4–3	2–0		
East Texas State Lions (Independent) (1919–1920)
1919	East Texas State	4–1–1			
East Texas State:		4–1–1			
Total:					

== See also ==
- List of judges of the Supreme Court of Missouri
