= Emory J. Hyde =

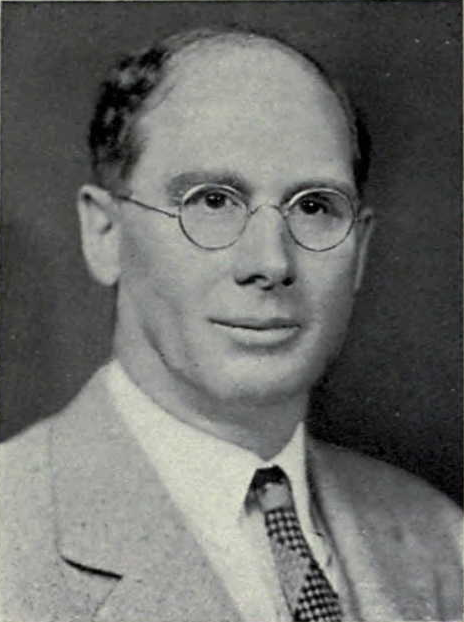
- Hyde from the 1938 Michiganensian

Biographical details
- Born: May 1879; Michigan, U.S.
- Died: June 6, 1956 (aged 77); Tucson, Arizona, U.S.

Playing career
- 1901: Michigan

Coaching career (HC unless noted)
- 1905–1907: TCU

Head coaching record
- Overall: 10–11–2

Emory J. Hyde (May 1879 – June 6, 1956) was an American college football player and coach, lawyer, and businessman. He played football for the University of Michigan's 1901 "Point-a-Minute" team. He was the head football coach at Texas Christian University from 1905 to 1907.

== Early years ==
Hyde was born in Michigan in approximately 1879. His father, James K. Hyde, was a farmer in Shiawassee County, Michigan. His parents were both Michigan natives. He was a graduate of the Mead School.

== University of Michigan ==
Hyde enrolled at the University of Michigan where he received his law degree in 1904. While attending Michigan, Hyde played football for the 1901 Michigan Wolverines football team. The 1901 Michigan team was the first of Fielding H. Yost's "Point-a-Minute" teams. The team compiled a record of 11–0 and outscored its opponents 550 to 0.

== TCU ==
In 1905, Hyde and Oliver W. Latham (Univ. of Michigan, '01) formed the law firm of Latham & Hyde in Dallas, Texas. While in Texas, he served as the head football coach at TCU from 1905 to 1907. In the summer of 1905, he wrote a letter published in The Michigan Alumnus announcing his hiring at TCU:

"I have signed to coach the Texas Christian University football team this season. T.C.U. is the only school of the Christian church in the South. It is located in Waco, Texas. I will take up my duties there September 1st, and return to Dallas after Thanksgiving. . . . I went after the job as soon as the season closed last fall, and with the very valuable aid of Yost and Dan McGugin, and the good name of Michigan behind me, I succeeded in landing it. The climate surely has agreed well with me so far."

Hyde compiled a record of 10–11–2 as the head coach at TCU.

== Family and later years ==
In approximately 1905, Hyde was married to Jessie Hyde, who was also a Michigan native. They had a daughter, Frances, born in approximately 1907 in Texas, and a son, James, born in approximately 1910 in Illinois. By 1910, Hyde and his wife had moved to Chicago where Hyde was employed as a manager for a reporting agency.

Hyde spent most of his career with Retail Credit Co., a credit reporting agency that changed its name to Equifax in 1979. In 1913, Hyde moved from Chicago to New York and became manager of the New York office of Retail Credit Co., with offices at 80 Maiden Lane. In 1920, Hyde was living with his family in Woodhaven, Queens, New York. He was employed at that time as the supervisor of managers for the Retail Credit Co. In 1927 and 1928, he was listed as a vice president of Retail Credit Co. in Atlanta.

In approximately 1929, Hyde was remarried to Agnes Hyde. By 1930, Hyde and his new wife living in Evanston, Illinois with Hyde's son, James (age 20). He was employed as an inspector for a credit bureau. In 1931, he was listed as a vice president of Retail Credit Co. in Chicago.

Hyde served as the president of the University of Michigan Alumni Association from 1935 to 1938. He received the Alumni Association's Distinguished Alumni Service Award in 1947.

Hyde moved to Tucson, Arizona in 1938. He died at his home there on June 6, 1956.

== Head coaching record ==
Year	Team	Overall	Conference	Standing	Bowl/playoffs
TCU (Independent) (1905–1907)
1905	TCU	4–4			
1906	TCU	2–5			
1907	TCU	4–2–2			
TCU:		10–11–2			
Total:		10–11–2			
