= John McKnight (coach) =

American football and basketball coach

Coaching career (HC unless noted)

Football
- 1920–1921: TCU (assistant)
- 1922: TCU

Basketball
- 1922–1923: TCU

Head coaching record
- Overall: 2–5–3 (football); 3–13 (basketball)

John McKnight was an American college football and college basketball coach. He served as the head football coach at Texas Christian University (TCU) in 1922, compiling a record 2–5–3. During the same academic year, 1922–23, he was also the school's head basketball coach, tallying a mark of 3–13. McKnight previously worked as an assistant football coach at TCU under William L. Driver during the 1920 and 1921 seasons.

== Head coaching record ==
=== Football ===
Year	Team	Overall	Conference	Standing	Bowl/playoffs
TCU Horned Frogs (Texas Intercollegiate Athletic Association) (1922)
1922	TCU	2–5–3	0–3–2		
TCU:		2–5–3	0–3–2		
Total:		2–5–3			
