= Willis T. Stewart =

American football player, coach, and administrator (1887–1960)

Biographical details
- Born: September 7, 1887; Jack County, Texas, U.S.
- Died: January 27, 1960 (aged 72); Albuquerque, New Mexico, U.S.

Playing career
- 1908–1910: Vanderbilt
- Position: End

Coaching career (HC unless noted)
- 1911: Bowen School (TN)
- 1912: TCU
- 1913–1917: Transylvania
- 1924–1926: Transylvania

Administrative career (AD unless noted)
- 1912–1913: TCU
- 1913–1917: Transylvania
- 1924–1926: Transylvania

Head coaching record
- Overall: 44–21–7 (college)

Willis Taylor "Slick" Stewart (September 7, 1887 – January 27, 1960) was an American college football player, coach, and athletics administrator. He played for Dan McGugin's Vanderbilt Commodores football teams and coached the Transylvania Pioneers football team.

In 1911, Willis coached at the Bowen School, a prep school in Nashville, Tennessee, with Frank Blake. He served as the head football coach at Texas Christian University (TCU) for one season in 1912, achieving a record of 8–1.

== Head coaching record ==
=== College ===
Year	Team	Overall	Conference	Standing	Bowl/playoffs
TCU (Texas Intercollegiate Athletic Association) (1912)
1912	TCU	8–1	3–0		
TCU:		8–1	3–0		
Transylvania Crimsons (Southern Intercollegiate Athletic Association) (1913–1917)
1913	Transylvania	5–2–1			
1914	Transylvania	7–1–1			
1915	Transylvania	7–1–1	3–0–1	4th	
1916	Transylvania	4–2–2	2–3–1		
1917	Transylvania	0–4–1			
Transylvania Pioneers (Southern Intercollegiate Athletic Association) (1924–1926)
1924	Transylvania	6–2	1–2	T–11th	
1925	Transylvania	3–5–1			
1926	Transylvania	4–3	1–1	T–14th	
Transylvania:		36–20–7			
Total:		44–21–7			
