= Stanley A. Boles =

American football and basketball coach and college athletics administrator

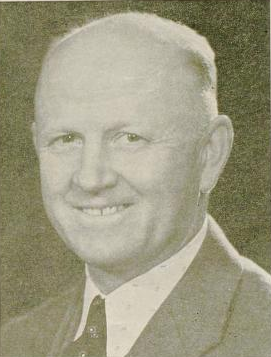
- Boles, c. 1934

Biographical details
- Born: July 25, 1887; Williamstown, Kentucky, U.S.
- Died: December 4, 1961 (aged 74); Lexington, Kentucky, U.S.

Coaching career (HC unless noted)

Football
- 1913: Polytechnic (TX)
- 1914: TCU
- 1915: Trinity (TX)
- 1916: Kentucky (assistant)
- 1917: Kentucky

Basketball
- 1917–1918: Kentucky

Golf
- 1938–1946: Kentucky

Administrative career (AD unless noted)
- 1915–1916: Trinity (TX)
- 1917–1933: Kentucky

Head coaching record
- Overall: 11–17–7 (football); 9–2–1 (basketball)

Stanley Atwood "Daddy" Boles (July 25, 1887 – December 4, 1961) was an American college football and college basketball coach and athletics administrator. He was the athletic director at the University of Kentucky from 1917 through 1933. He also served as head coach of the Kentucky Wildcats football and Kentucky Wildcats men's basketball teams for one season each. He was responsible for hiring legendary men's basketball coach Adolph Rupp at Kentucky.

== Biography ==
Boles was born on July 25, 1887, in Williamstown, Kentucky. He graduated from Kentucky Wesleyan College, earned a master's degree from Vanderbilt University in 1911, and also studied at the University of Virginia.

Boles served as the head football coach at Polytechnic College—now known as Texas Wesleyan University—in Fort Worth, Texas, for one season, in 1913, leading his team to a record of 2–2–4. Boles was the head football coach at Texas Christian University (TCU) in 1914 and then at Trinity University in Waxahachie, Texas, in 1915.

In 1916, Boles was hired by the University of Kentucky to assist athletic director John J. Tigert with coaching. He was he head coach of the Kentucky Wildcats football team in 1917, compiling a 3–5–1 record He also served as Kentucky's basketball coach in 1917–18, tallying a mark of 9–2–1 record. The rare basketball tie, against Kentucky Wesleyan, was because of a scorer's error that was not discovered until after the game had ended and both teams had departed.

Boles was found dead at his home, in Lexington, Kentucky, on December 4, 1961. His brother, Ewing T. Boles, was a noted businessman and philanthropist.

== Head coaching record ==
=== Football ===
Year	Team	Overall	Conference	Standing	Bowl/playoffs
Polytechnic (Independent) (1913)
1913	Polytechnic	2–2–4			
Polytechnic:		2–2–4			
TCU (Texas Intercollegiate Athletic Association) (1914)
1914	TCU	4–4–2	2–2		
TCU:		4–4–2	2–2		
Trinity Tigers (Independent) (1915)
1915	Trinity	2–6			
Trinity:		2–6			
Kentucky Wildcats (Independent) (1917)
1917	Kentucky	3–5–1			
Kentucky:		3–5–1			
Total:		11–17–7			

=== Basketball ===
Record table
Season	Team	Overall	Conference	Standing	Postseason
Kentucky Wildcats (Independent) (1917–1918)
1917–18	Kentucky	9–2–1			
Kentucky:		9–2–1			
Total:		9–2–1			
