= Henry W. Lever =

American sports coach and educator (1883–1980)

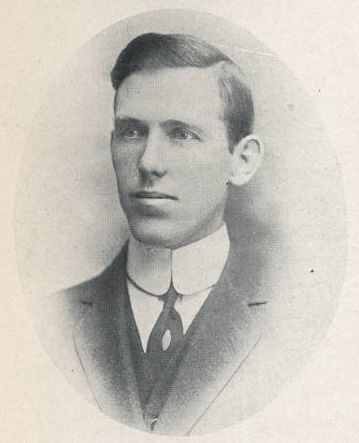
- Lever pictured in The Hinakaga 1913–14, Carroll yearbook

Biographical details
- Born: October 4, 1883; Loveland, Ohio, U.S.
- Died: July 1, 1980 (aged 96); Madras, Oregon, U.S.

Coaching career (HC unless noted)

Football
- 1909: Valley City State
- 1911: TCU
- 1913: Carroll (WI)
- 1930–1938: Linfield
- 1940–1942: Linfield

Basketball
- 1910–1911: Valley City State
- 1912–1914: Carroll (WI)
- 1930–1941: Linfield
- 1942–1947: Linfield

Baseball
- 1912: TCU
- 1947: Linfield

Track and field
- 1931–1935: Linfield
- 1941–1943: Linfield

Administrative career (AD unless noted)
- 1930–1949: Linfield

Head coaching record
- Overall: 39–63–10 (college football)

Accomplishments and honors

Championships
- Football; 1 NWC (1935)

Henry Work Lever (October 4, 1883 – July 1, 1980) was an American college sports coach and educator. He was a college football coach at four different colleges, as well as an athletic director, baseball coach, basketball coach, and track coach.

== Early life ==
Lever graduated from high school in Loveland, Ohio, in 1901 and then started college at Miami University. After also attending Ohio Northern University, he then graduated from Ohio University in 1908, playing football at all three schools. Lever then began teaching at today's Valley City State University in North Dakota that same year, where he also served as athletic director. The next year, he married Marguerite Sherburne, with the marriage producing nine children. After a few years the family moved to Missouri to farm.

== Coaching career ==
In 1911, Lever was named the eighth head football coach at the Texas Christian University (TUC) in Fort Worth, Texas. His team produced a record of 4 wins and 5 losses that year. For 1912 he was TCU's baseball manager.

After his years at TCU, Lever became the tenth head football coach at Carroll College in Waukesha, Wisconsin and he held that position for the 1913 season. At the school he was also the men's basketball coach for two seasons from 1912 to 1914. His football coaching record at Carroll was 2–2–3.

Lever moved his family north to Alberta, Canada around 1916 to farm, but returned to the states about 1921 and started farming in Yakima, Washington. They moved again to the southern Oregon Coast, eventually settling in Myrtle Point where he was a teacher at the high school and coached baseball, football, track, and basketball. Linfield College in McMinnville, Oregon, then hired him in 1930 and he worked there as athletic director until 1949. Lever was also the football coach from 1930 to 1938, and again from 1940 to 1942, compiling a record of 30–54–7, with a conference championship in 1935, the school's first.

At Linfield he also was the men's basketball coach from 1930 to 1941 and again from 1942 to 1947. Lever had a record of 173–109 for a .613 winning percentage, the highest in school history for a coach with at least two seasons. He was also the track coach from 1931 to 1935 and 1941 to 1943, and then baseball coach in 1947 when they won their first Northwest Conference championship. He was later inducted into the college's athletic hall of fame.

== Later years ==
In 1952, Marguerite died and Lever moved to Central Oregon in 1953, settling in Madras. He farmed briefly before moving into real estate as broker, which he continued until his death on July 1, 1980, after he was hit by a truck as he crossed the highway.

== Head coaching record ==
=== College football ===
Year	Team	Overall	Conference	Standing	Bowl/playoffs
Valley City State Vikings (Independent) (1909)
1909	Valley City State	3–2			
Valley City State:		3–2			
TCU (Texas Intercollegiate Athletic Association) (1911)
1911	TCU	4–5	0–3		
TCU:		4–5	0–3		
Carroll Pioneers (Independent) (1913)
1913	Carroll	2–2–3			
Carroll:		2–2–3			
Linfield Wildcats (Northwest Conference) (1930–1938)
1930	Linfield	1–7	0–4	6th	
1931	Linfield	0–6–1	0–3	6th	
1932	Linfield	3–5	1–3	5th	
1933	Linfield	4–4	2–2	T–3rd	
1934	Linfield	5–3	2–3	5th	
1935	Linfield	5–2–2	3–0–1	T–1st	
1936	Linfield	3–3–2	3–2–1	T–3rd	
1937	Linfield	3–4			
1938	Linfield	2–6	1–3	T–5th	
Linfield Wildcats (Northwest Conference) (1940–1942)
1940	Linfield	1–7	0–5	6th	
1941	Linfield	1–6–1	0–4	6th	
1942	Linfield	2–1–1	0–1–1	5th	
Linfield:		30–54–7	12–30–3		
Total:		39–63–10			
National championship Conference title Conference division title or championship game berth
