= Fort Worth Classic =

1921 Fort Worth Classic
Centre Praying Colonels	TCU Horned Frogs
(7–2)	(9–0)
63	7
Head coach: Charley Moran	Head coach: William L. Driver
	1	2	3	4	Total
Centre	21	7	20	15	63
TCU	7	0	0	0	7
- Date: January 1, 1921
- Season: 1920
- Stadium: Panther Park
- Location: Fort Worth, Texas
- Attendance: 7,000

The Fort Worth Classic was a postseason college football bowl game played only once, on January 1, 1921, at Panther Park in Fort Worth, Texas, between Centre Praying Colonels of Centre College and the TCU Horned Frogs of Texas Christian University.

Centre entered the game with a record of 7–2 with wins against Kentucky and VPI. Centre's losses came against Harvard (8–0–1 on the year) and Georgia Tech (8–1 on the year). Centre had outscored its opponents 469–55 and won its first three games of the year by a combined score of 241–0.

TCU entered the game with a record of 9–0, including wins at Arkansas (19–2) and at Baylor (21–9). TCU had attained its perfect record while outscoring its opponents 163–46.

Centre won the game handily by a score of 63 to 7.

This game should not be confused with the modern Fort Worth Bowl, now called the Lockheed Martin Armed Forces Bowl.

== See also ==
- List of college bowl games
