= H. E. Hildebrand =

Former American football coach

Biographical details
- Born: July 21, 1867; Fayette County, Texas, U.S.
- Died: November 14, 1931 (aged 64); Bexar County, Texas, U.S.

Coaching career (HC unless noted)
- 1902: TCU

Head coaching record
- Overall: 0–5–1

Henry Elbert Hildebrand (July 21, 1867 – November 14, 1931) was an American college football coach. He is credited with being the head football coach at Texas Christian University (TCU) in 1902, although it is unclear how many games he coached.

== Head coaching record ==
Year	Team	Overall	Conference	Standing	Bowl/playoffs
TCU (Independent) (1902)
1902	TCU	0–5–1			
TCU:		0–5–1			
Total:		0–5–1			
