= Fred Cahoon =

American football, basketball, and baseball coach

Biographical details
- Born: November 26, 1876; Texas, U.S.
- Died: September 13, 1945 (aged 68); Jacksboro, Texas, U.S.

Coaching career (HC unless noted)

Football
- 1913: TCU

Basketball
- 1914–1915: TCU

Baseball
- 1914: TCU
- 1919–1920: TCU

Head coaching record
- Overall: 5–2–1 (football); 11–12 (basketball); 27–11–2 (baseball)

Frederick Miller Cahoon (November 26, 1876 – September 13, 1945) was an American football, basketball, and baseball coach. He served as head coach in all three sports between 1913 and 1920 at Texas Christian University (TCU), where was also school's director of bands.

== Head coaching record ==
=== Football ===
Year	Team	Overall	Conference	Standing	Bowl/playoffs
TCU (Independent) (1913)
1913	TCU	5–2–1			
TCU:		5–2–1			
Total:		3–1–2			
