= Ted D. Hackney =

American football and basketball coach (1888–1971)

Biographical details
- Born: June 10, 1888
- Died: October 19, 1971 (aged 83); Fort Worth, Texas, U.S.

Playing career

Football
- 1909–1911: Missouri

Basketball
- 1909–1910: Missouri

Baseball
- 1911–1912: Missouri
- Position: Halfback (football)

Coaching career (HC unless noted)

Football
- 1919: TCU

Basketball
- 1919–1920: TCU

Head coaching record
- Overall: 1–7 (football); 1–7 (basketball)

Theodore Edgar Dupue Hackney (June 10, 1888 – October 19, 1971) was an American football and basketball coach. He served as the head football coach at Texas Christian University (TCU) in Fort Worth, Texas in 1919, compiling a record of 1–7. Hackney was the school's head basketball coach during the 1919–20 season, tallying a mark of 1–7. A native of Springfield, Missouri, Hackney played football, basketball, and baseball, and the University of Missouri.

== Head coaching record ==
=== Football ===
Year	Team	Overall	Conference	Standing	Bowl/playoffs
TCU Horned Frogs (Texas Intercollegiate Athletic Association) (1919)
1919	TCU	1–7	1–4	9th	
TCU:		1–7	1–4		
Total:		1–7			
