= William L. Driver =

American football and basketball coach (1883–1941)

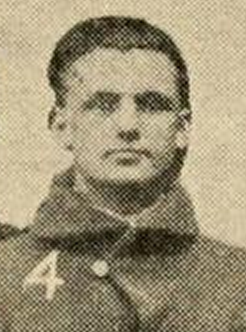
- Driver at Washburn, c. 1912

Biographical details
- Born: November 7, 1883; Missouri, U.S.
- Died: November 29, 1941 (aged 58); Tulare County, California, U.S.

Playing career

Football
- 1906–1908: Missouri

Basketball
- 1906–1908: Missouri
- Position: End (football)

Coaching career (HC unless noted)

Football
- 1911–1912: Washburn
- 1913–1914: Ole Miss
- 1920–1921: TCU
- 1923–1927: Cal Aggies
- 1929: Loyola (CA)

Basketball
- 1917–1920: Texas A&M
- 1920–1922: TCU
- 1923–1927: Cal Aggies

Administrative career (AD unless noted)
- 1910–1913: Washburn
- 1913–1915: Ole Miss
- 1915–1919: Texas A&M
- 1920–1922: TCU

Head coaching record
- Overall: 58–45–7 (football); 67–56 (basketball)
- Bowls: 0–1

Accomplishments and honors

Championships
- Football; 1 TIAA (1920) Basketball; 1 SWC (1920)

William Lloyd Driver (November 7, 1883 – November 29, 1941) was an American college football and college basketball coach. He served as the head football coach at Washburn University from 1911 to 1912, at the University of Mississippi (Ole Miss) from 1913 to 1914, at Texas Christian University (TCU) from 1920 to 1921, at the Northern Branch of the College of Agriculture—now University of California, Davis—from 1923 to 1927, and at Loyola College of Los Angeles—now Loyola Marymount University—in 1929, compiling a career college football record of 58–45–7. Driver was also the head basketball coach at Texas A&M University, TCU, and Cal Aggies, tallying a career college basketball mark of 67–56.

Driver was born in Missouri in 1883. He died in California in 1941.

== Coaching career ==
At Washburn, Driver was the 12th head football coach and athletic director; he held that position for two seasons, from 1911 until 1912. His overall coaching record was 8–8–1. This ranks him 17th in terms of total wins and 19th in terms of winning percentage.

From 1913 to 1914, he coached at Mississippi, where he compiled an 11–7–2 record. From 1920 to 1921, he coached at TCU, where he compiled a 15–4–1 season. That total included a 9–1 season in 1920. From 1923 to 1927, he coached at UC Davis and compiled an 18–23–3 record.

Between 1917 and 1920 he coached basketball at Texas A&M where he compiled an overall record of 42–13. In 1919–20, his team won the Southwest Conference championship.

== Head coaching record ==
=== Football ===
Year	Team	Overall	Conference	Standing	Bowl/playoffs
Washburn Ichabods (Kansas College Athletic Conference) (1911–1912)
1911	Washburn	3–4–2			
1912	Washburn	5–3			
Washburn:		8–8–1			
Ole Miss Rebels (Southern Intercollegiate Athletic Association) (1913–1914)
1913	Ole Miss	6–3–1			
1914	Ole Miss	5–4–1			
Ole Miss:		11–7–2			
TCU Horned Frogs (Texas Intercollegiate Athletic Association) (1920–1921)
1920	TCU	9–1	3–0	1st	L Fort Worth Classic
1921	TCU	6–3–1	2–1	5th	
TCU:		14–4–1	5–1		
Cal Aggies (Independent) (1923–1924)
1923	Cal Aggies	2–7			
1924	Cal Aggies	5–4–1			
Cal Aggies (Far Western Conference) (1925–1927)
1925	Cal Aggies	5–3	2–2	3rd	
1926	Cal Aggies	2–6–1	0–4	5th	
1927	Cal Aggies	4–3–1	2–1	T–2nd	
Cal Aggies:		18–23–3	4–7		
Loyola Lions (Independent) (1929)
1929	Loyola	6–3			
Loyola:		6–3			
Total:		58–45–7			
