= TCU Horned Frogs football =

American football team of Texas Christian University

2026 TCU Horned Frogs football team
- First season: 1896; 130 years ago
- Athletic director: Mike Buddie
- Head coach: Sonny Dykes; 4th season, 39–21 (.650)
- Location: Fort Worth, Texas
- Stadium: Amon G. Carter Stadium (capacity: 53,294)
- NCAA division: Division I FBS
- Conference: Big 12 champs 2014
- Colors: Purple and white
- All-time record: 682–562–57 (.546)
- CFP record: 1–1 (.500)
- Bowl record: 20–17–1 (.539)

National championships
- Claimed: 1935, 1938
- Unclaimed: 2010

National finalist
- CFP: 2022

College Football Playoff appearances
- 2022

Conference championships
- TIAA: 1920 SWC: 1929, 1932, 1938, 1944, 1951, 1955, 1958, 1959, 1994 WAC: 1999, 2000 C-USA: 2002 MWC: 2005, 2009, 2010, 2011
- Heisman winners: Davey O'Brien – 1938
- Consensus All-Americans: 17
- Rivalries: Baylor (rivalry); SMU (rivalry; dormant); Texas (rivalry; dormant); Texas A&M (rivalry; dormant); Texas Tech (rivalry)

Uniforms
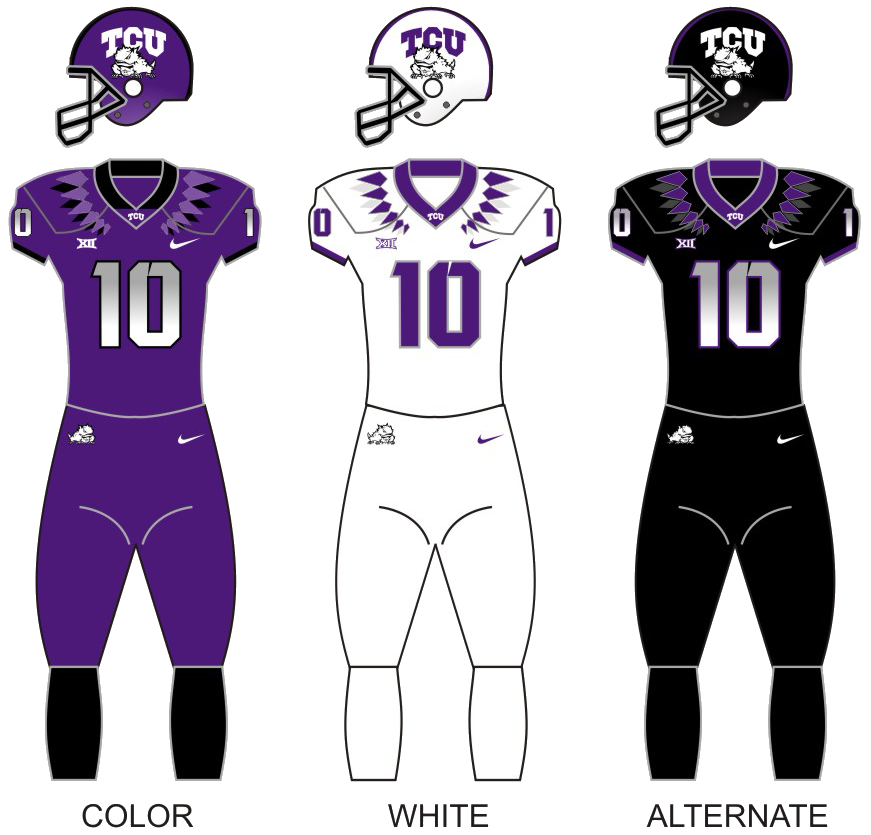
- Fight song: TCU March
- Mascot: Super Frog
- Website: GoFrogs.com

The TCU Horned Frogs football team represents Texas Christian University (TCU) in college football at the NCAA Division I Football Bowl Subdivision (FBS). The Horned Frogs play their home games in Amon G. Carter Stadium, which is located on the TCU campus in Fort Worth. TCU began playing football in 1896 and has been a member of the Big 12 Conference since 2012.

The Horned Frogs claim national championships in 1935 and 1938, when they were led by Pro Football Hall of Fame quarterback Sammy Baugh and Heisman Trophy winner Davey O'Brien, respectively. TCU has had six other Heisman finalists. In addition to Baugh and O'Brien, TCU has had six other former players inducted into the College Football Hall of Fame. Following decades of futility during the late 20th century, TCU returned to national prominence under head coach Dennis Franchione (1998–2000). Franchione led the Horned Frogs to their first bowl game win and AP poll finish since the 1950s. TCU enjoyed further success under Franchione's successor, Gary Patterson (2001–2021). Patterson led the Horned Frogs to ten seasons of 11 or more wins, including a perfect 2010 season, six AP top 10 finishes. Sonny Dykes would replace Patterson in 2022 and lead TCU to their first College Football Playoff berth. They defeated Michigan in the Fiesta Bowl semifinal and advanced to the national championship, where they lost to Georgia.

TCU ranks 4th all time in final AP poll points among private schools, behind Notre Dame, USC, and Miami-FL. The Horned Frogs are also one of only four FBS teams to have played in all six College Football Playoff Bowls, winning all but the Orange.

== History ==
=== Early history (1896–1982) ===
TCU's first year of football started on December 7, 1896, when it went by the name AddRan Christian University until 1902. TCU won its first game ever played by beating Toby's Business College to the score of 8–6, without having to use any substitutes. TCU finished the 1896 season with a record of 1–1–1, before improving to 3–1 the following year. During this time, the university was located in Waco, Texas, until they returned to Fort Worth in 1910 where the school was founded. Prior to joining the Southwest Conference in 1923, TCU amassed a record of 165–15–0. In 1912, TCU went 8–1–0 and scored 230 points while only allowing 53 points the whole season. In 1920, TCU won its first conference title as a member of the Texas Intercollegiate Athletic Association (TIAA). The Horned Frogs' 9–1–0 record earned them a spot in the Fort Worth Classic, also known as the Dixie Bowl, against Centre College. Although the game was played in Fort Worth, Centre won the game 63–7. In 1923, during TCU's first year in the SWC, it earned a 2–1–0 conference record and a 5–4–0 overall record. One loss that year was a 40–21 decision against TCU's emerging rival, the SMU Mustangs, who went 9–0 en route to a conference championship. The next year, TCU finished second place in the conference with a 5–1 SWC record and another 5–2 overall record. After two great seasons, the Horned Frogs righted the ship. Prior to 1923 TCU had had a revolving door of coaches, with no one coaching the football team for more than two years. Following entrance to the SWC, the school established a high degree of stability, employing just four coaches over the next 43 years, and would not hit last place again until 1953. Under those four coaches (Bell, Schmidt, Meyer, and Martin), the Frogs accumulated a record of 262–165–30. Matty Bell, who began coaching the Frogs in 1923, had his best year in 1928, his last year as coach. That year's only losses came at home 7–6 to the Baylor Bears and to Texas by a score of 6–0. That year the Frogs finished in second place in the conference at 8–2–0 overall and 3–2 in conference play. The 1929 season saw the arrival of Coach Francis Schmidt and TCU's first SWC title. The title was won in the last game of the year on November 30, 1929, against SMU. Coming into the game TCU led SMU in the conference standings. TCU had 4 wins, while SMU's conference record was 3–0–1. Since this was the last conference game of the year for both teams, TCU could win its first SWC title with a win or a tie. The first half of the game was scoreless, but in the third quarter Weldon "Speedy" Mason tacked on 40 yards to a 16-yard pass from SMU quarterback Bob Gilbert. After the extra point, the Mustangs led 7–0. TCU would not score until its second time on the SMU 1-yard line in the fourth quarter. That is when TCU quarterback Howard Grubbs ran behind All-SWC fullback Harlos Green and Mike Brumbelow for the game-tying score. The Frogs left plenty of time on the clock for SMU to answer their score, but Grubbs, now playing defense, intercepted Gilbert's pass. TCU then ran the clock out to force the tie and to win its first SWC title.

1935 began the first year for TCU coach Dutch Meyer. That year TCU and SMU again met to decide not only the SWC title but the first trip to the Rose Bowl for a team from the SWC. Grantland Rice of the New York Sun called it the "Game of the Century" and reported the following:

In a TCU Stadium that seated 30,000 spectators, over 36,000 wildly excited Texans and visitors from every corner of the map packed, jammed, and fought their way into every square foot of standing and seating space to see one of the greatest football games ever played…this tense, keyed up crowd even leaped the wire fences from the top of automobiles...

SMU scored the first 14 points of the game. TCU, led by All-American quarterback Sammy Baugh, tied the game at the beginning of the fourth quarter. Then, with seven minutes left in the game SMU, on a 4th and 4 on the Frogs' 37 yard-line, lined up to punt. Quarterback Bob Finley threw a 50-yard pass to running back Bobby Wilson who made what is described as a "jumping, twisting catch that swept him over the line for the touchdown." TCU would lose the game 20–14, but would be invited to play the LSU Tigers in the 1936 Sugar Bowl, where the Frogs would be victorious 3–2 at messy and muddy Tulane Stadium. Even with the loss to SMU, who later lost to Stanford in the 1936 Rose Bowl, TCU claims 1935 as a national championship year. Dan Jenkins states that one of the first statistical national polls was created by Frank G. Dickinson in 1924. By 1935 there were several other polls, and "…only one of them was big and caught on big and rivaled Dickinson. This was the Paul O. Williamson System out of New Orleans. It quickly gained nation-wide respect and a large syndicated circulation." The Williamson System awarded TCU a shared championship with LSU in 1935, the year before the first sportswriter poll by the Associated Press. The Dickinson poll awarded SMU the national title, and several smaller polls designated the University of Minnesota and Princeton University as their champions Meyer led TCU to a win in the inaugural Cotton Bowl Classic in 1937. A year later, TCU would go undefeated in 1938 behind TCU's only Heisman Trophy winner—quarterback Davey O'Brien. That year the Frogs' closest game came against the University of Arkansas where they beat the Razorbacks 21–14 in Fort Worth. They were invited to the 1939 Sugar Bowl and beat the Carnegie Tech Tartans from Pittsburgh by a score of 15–7 in front of more than 50,000 spectators. Meyer coached TCU from 1934 to 1952, compiling a record of 109–79–13. He also won seven Southwest Conference titles. During Meyer's tenure, TCU played in the first nationally televised regular season game against Kansas.

When Dutch Meyer retired, his backfield assistant, Abe Martin, became head coach at TCU. One of his three tries at a SWC title came in 1958. The Frogs only losses were to Iowa by a score of 0–17 and at No. 18 SMU, 13–20. The 1958 season ended in a scoreless tie against the Air Force Falcons in the 1959 Cotton Bowl Classic. Martin-led TCU teams amassed a 1–3–1 record in bowl games. The lone win came in the 1957 Cotton Bowl Classic against a Jim Brown-led Syracuse team in front of 68,000 spectators. A blocked extra-point attempt was the difference in the game and allowed the Horned Frogs to win 28–27. After TCU won the 1959 SWC championship, the Horned Frogs did not earn another share of the conference title for 20 years. During this time, TCU played the role of the underdog. In 1961, Bill Van Fleet of the Fort Worth Star-Telegram called the Horned Frogs' 6–0 win at then-No. 1 Texas, "the season's greatest upset of the year".[17] In 1965, TCU traveled to El Paso to play in the Sun Bowl against UTEP; the Frogs lost[18] 13–12.

The subpar results of Martin's last eight seasons would become the norm for TCU for most of the next quarter century. Martin retired in 1966 to focus on his role as athletic director, and the state of football at TCU declined in the late 1960s and into the 1970s. Coaches Fred Taylor, Jim Pittman, and Billy Tohill showed limited success from 1967 until 1973. Pittman had a .500 (3–3–1) record in his lone season when he succumbed to a sideline heart attack at Baylor in game eight of 1971. The Horned Frogs bottomed out in the second half of the 1970s. Under Coach Jim Shofner (1974–76) the Frogs struggled mightily to a 2–31 record that included a winless 1976 campaign. F.A. Dry's coaching administration commenced in 1977 and reveled in a 2–9 record after the previous poor seasons. In his six seasons, Dry's Frog teams mustered only 12 wins total and no seasons with more than three wins. During the nine year stretch from 1974 to 1982, TCU won just 14 games overall while losing 82 (and tying three), one of the worst showings for any Division I(-A) team during this period. Only Northwestern had a worse record (12–86–1) during this stretch among "power conference" teams (at the time, the ACC, Big 8, Big 10, Pac-8/Pac-10, SEC and SWC) and major independents.

=== Jim Wacker era (1983–1991) ===
TCU would have a successful year in 1984 under coach Jim Wacker. That year TCU leaned on All-American running back Kenneth Davis. The squad started the season 8–0 finishing the regular season with three losses. The Frogs were invited to the Bluebonnet Bowl in Houston that year to play the West Virginia Mountaineers, their first bowl appearance in twenty years. The Frogs would lose to the Mountaineers 31–14 and finish with a record of 8–4. TCU would not attend another bowl game until the 1994 Independence Bowl.

TCU had high hopes for 1985. Davis had been a finalist for the Heisman Trophy in 1984, and was one of the early favorites to win it in 1985. However, for all intents and purposes, the Horned Frogs' season ended a few days after the first game when Wacker discovered that several players, including Davis, had been benefiting from a payment plan in violation of NCAA rules. Wacker promptly kicked the players off the team and self-reported the infractions to the NCAA. The Frogs collapsed to a 3–8 record, including a winless SWC slate. In 1986, the NCAA slapped TCU with three years' probation and a ban on postseason play in the 1986 season. The most severe penalty in the long run, however, was a reduction to only 25 scholarships in 1987 and 1988. To this day, Horned Frog fans remain bitter that the NCAA imposed such a severe penalty given that the violations were voluntarily reported. As heavy-handed as this penalty was, the NCAA seriously considered banning the Horned Frogs from bowl games and live television for three years and no new scholarships in 1987 or 1988. However, it praised Wacker for taking swift corrective action once the violations came to light, including kicking the players off the team when he was well aware that it would cripple the team for the upcoming season. As it turned out, the penalties that were imposed were severe enough that TCU would need the rest of the 1980s and most of the 1990s to recover; they would only have three winning seasons from 1985 to 1997. TCU would not have another winning season until 1991 (though coming close in 1987 and 1990). In 1991, the Horned Frogs finished 7–4, their first winning season in eight years. However, blowout losses to Texas and Texas A&M kept them out of a bowl. Following the season, Wacker left for Minnesota.

=== Pat Sullivan era (1992–1997) ===
In 1992, TCU hired Pat Sullivan, the 1971 Heisman Trophy winner from Auburn, as head coach. His tenure at TCU was plagued with inconsistency, but he had some success. In 1992, his first year as head coach, Sullivan introduced a new arched TCU logo. This change to the uniforms was part of a broader plan by Sullivan and the school to replace the expectation of losing with a new look and attitude, including returning to a natural grass playing field. Since its introduction the arched TCU has become the preferred and most popular of the school's logos. In 1992 Sullivan's team finished 2–8–1, but one of their victories was a 28–14 triumph over the Texas Longhorns, which was a major accomplishment for the program at that time. The 1993 team continued to show signs of improvement, finishing 4–7. 1994 was Sullivan's best year. In the final game of that season, Sullivan led TCU to a 24–17 victory over Texas Tech before a crowd of 43,000 at Amon G. Carter Stadium. That victory propelled the Frogs to a 7–5 record and a share of the Southwest Conference title. It was the first Southwest Conference title for TCU since 1959. Invited to the Independence Bowl in Shreveport, Louisiana, the Frogs lost, 20–10, to the Virginia Cavaliers. After 1994, the team regressed: the Frogs went 6–5 in 1995, the last year of the Southwest Conference. TCU struggled even more during Sullivan's final two seasons, when the team competed in the Western Athletic Conference. They finished 4–7 in 1996, and a disastrous 1–10 campaign in 1997 led to Sullivan's mid-season resignation; the lone win was in the season finale over SMU for the Iron Skillet. One of Coach Sullivan's greatest contributions to TCU was the recruitment of future NFL star running back LaDainian Tomlinson to Fort Worth.

=== Dennis Franchione era (1998–2000) ===
Franchione inherited a program that had posted a dismal .323 winning percentage from 1966 to 1997. However, he immediately improved the program. Under Dennis Franchione, and with the stellar play of backs Tomlinson and Basil Mitchell, a 6–5 TCU defeated the USC Trojans in the 1998 Sun Bowl. The high point of the Franchione era was a 10–1 regular season record, a Mobile Alabama Bowl berth vs. Southern Miss and a season-ending No. 13 AP national ranking in 2000. In the three years Coach Franchione coached TCU, his bowl record was 2–0 and he accumulated three WAC Championships. Franchione coached the entire 2000 regular season, but left for the head coaching position at the University of Alabama prior to the 2000 Mobile Alabama Bowl.

=== Gary Patterson era (2000–2021) ===
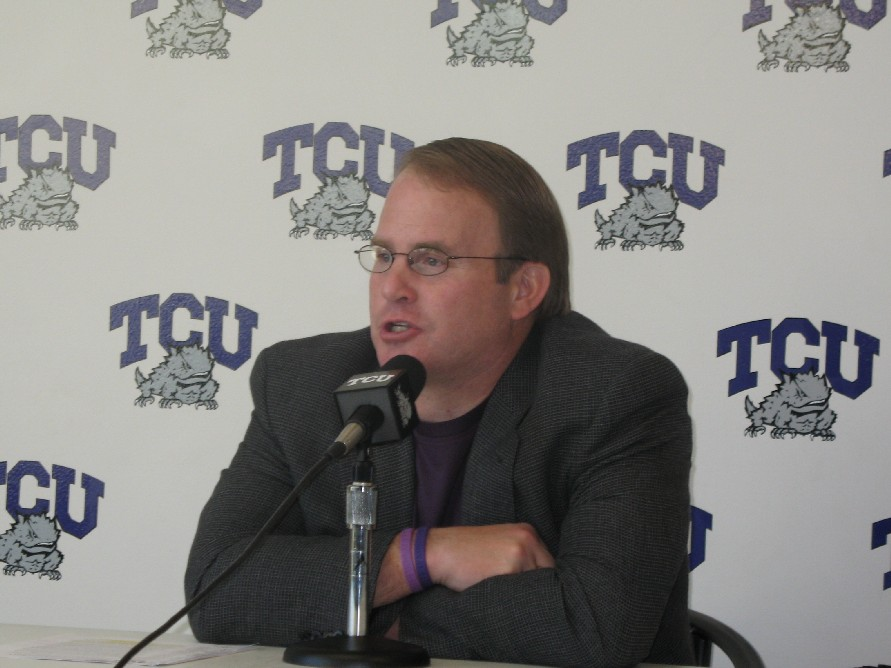
Gary Patterson, former head coach of the TCU Horned Frogs

Defensive Coordinator Gary Patterson took over as head coach for the bowl game in 2000, a 28–21 loss to Southern Miss. In 2001 TCU left the WAC for Conference USA (C-USA). TCU would stay in C-USA for only four years before accepting an invitation to join the Mountain West Conference (MWC). Patterson led the Horned Frogs to six conference championships. In 2002, TCU shared the C-USA title with Cincinnati. In 2005, TCU won the MWC title their first year in the league, and the Frogs claimed additional conference crowns in 2009, 2010, and 2011, and Patterson has had a winning season every year except for 2004, 2013, and 2016, and TCU has gone to a bowl game every year except 2004 and 2013. In the 2005 Houston Bowl, played at Reliant Stadium in Houston, Texas, the Horned Frogs defeated the Iowa State Cyclones by a score of 27–24. In the 2006 Poinsettia Bowl TCU defeated the Northern Illinois Huskies 37–7. In 2007, the Horned Frogs returned to play in the 2007 Texas Bowl, a revival of the old Houston Bowl, and defeated the Houston Cougars, 20–13. In a return to the Poinsettia Bowl in 2008, the No. 11 Frogs defeated unbeaten No. 9 Boise State 17–16. Boise State was the second-to-last unbeaten team in the nation in 2008 besides the Utah Utes. TCU's Poinsettia Bowl victory helped them finish the 2008 season ranked No. 7 in the country.

In 2009, TCU again attained national prominence with its second undefeated regular season (12–0) and first since Dutch Meyer led the Frogs to perfection in 1938. They lost in the 2010 Tostitos Fiesta Bowl 17–10 to the Boise State Broncos, on January 4, 2010—their first major-bowl appearance since the 1959 Cotton Bowl. In the following year, the Horned Frogs capped their second consecutive perfect regular season with a win in their first Rose Bowl, a 21–19 victory over Big Ten co-champion Wisconsin on New Year's Day, 2011. This capped off only the second undefeated and untied season in school history. After going 11–2 and winning the Mountain West title again in 2011, the Horned Frogs played Louisiana Tech in the Poinsettia Bowl. TCU won 31–24 in a somewhat lackluster performance after narrowly (and somewhat controversially) missing their third BCS Bowl bid in a row. TCU finished 16th in the final BCS rankings, two slots below the cutoff for a non-AQ team to get a BCS bid. The win allowed Patterson to tie Meyer as the winningest coach in TCU history. On October 10, 2011, the TCU Board of Trustees approved an invitation to join the Big 12 Conference, and entered that conference on July 1, 2012. The move to the Big 12 was a return "home" in a sense for the Horned Frogs, as they renewed many of their in-state rivalries from the old Southwest Conference. Before the move to the Big 12, the Horned Frogs had been reckoned as one of the closest things to a major football power in a mid-major conference. Amon G. Carter Stadium, the Horned Frogs' home field since 1929, concluded large renovations prior to the 2012 season. It featured a new press box, suites, club seats and improved fan amenities in many areas—new and more comfortable seating, wider concourses, new and improved restrooms and concessions areas, handicapped-accessible accommodations, elevators and escalators to move patrons among levels, and new lighting. The stadium was used during the 2011 season while being renovated. The Horned Frogs played their first game in the renovated stadium on September 8, 2012, and routed Grambling 56–0. The win was also Patterson's 110th win with the Horned Frogs, making him the winningest coach in TCU history. TCU would finish their first regular season in the Big 12 at 7–5 before losing to Michigan State in the Buffalo Wild Wings Bowl 17–16.

The Horned Frogs returned to national prominence in 2014, after they finished the 2013 season with a disappointing 4–8 record. The Horned Frogs started with a 4–0 record to begin the year, with wins over Samford, SMU, No. 24-ranked Minnesota which would finish the season unranked, and rallying in the 4th quarter to beat No. 4-ranked Oklahoma, which would also finish the season unranked. After the upset of Oklahoma, the Horned Frogs rose to the No. 9 ranking going into their October 11 meeting with then No. 7-ranked Baylor. With approximately 11 minutes remaining in the game and despite Baylor leading in every offensive statistical category, TCU had a commanding 58–37 lead over the Bears. Baylor then dominated TCU by scoring 24 unanswered points in the fourth quarter to defeat the Horned Frogs 61–58. Baylor would finish the game with 782 yards of offense and 39 first downs compared to TCU's 485 yards of offense and 23 first downs. The Baylor game would be the lone loss for TCU in 2014, and despite having to rally against Big 12 bottom-dweller Kansas, they would win their remaining seven games behind the leadership of their Heisman Trophy finalist quarterback, Trevone Boykin. The Horned Frogs began to emerge as a National Championship contender after their convincing 41–20 win over then No. 7-ranked Kansas State. Despite their struggles against last-place Kansas and Oklahoma and their loss to Baylor, going into the final week of the regular season, TCU was ranked No. 3 in the newly formed College Football Playoff poll, which coincided with the new College Football Playoff system, whose format selects the Top 4 teams in the rankings at the end of the season to participate in a four-team playoff system to decide a National Champion. TCU soundly defeated Iowa State in their final regular season game to finish the 2014 season with an 11–1 record. On December 7, 2014, the final College Football Playoff rankings were released, and the Horned Frogs dropped to the No. 6 ranking in the poll, abruptly ending the Horned Frogs' National Championship hopes. TCU decimated No. 9 Ole Miss 42–3 in the Peach Bowl. Patterson resigned under pressure as TCU head coach on October 21, 2021. Assistant coach Jerry Kill finished out the season as the team's interim head coach.

=== Sonny Dykes era (2022–present) ===
On November 26, 2021, SMU head coach Sonny Dykes left to take over the rival TCU football program as head coach. Dykes also has head coaching experience at Louisiana Tech and California and signed a six-year contract with the Horned Frogs.

In his first season, Dykes went 12–0 before losing to Kansas State in the Big 12 Championship Game. The Horned Frogs finished 12–1 and ranked 3rd in the College Football Playoff rankings. They beat the Michigan Wolverines in the college football semi-final on December 31, 2022, 51–45. They played the Georgia Bulldogs in the College Football Playoff National Championship on January 9, 2023, with the Bulldogs coming out victorious 65–7 to win their second title in a row.

TCU started the 2023 season ranked #17 before being upset by Colorado. The team could not recover and finished the season with a 5–7 record.

The 2024 season was a return to form for TCU, winning 8 regular season games and winning the New Mexico Bowl against Louisiana 34–3.

== Conference affiliations ==
Sources:

- Independent (1896–1913, 1921–1922)
- Texas Intercollegiate Athletic Association (1914–1920)
- Southwest Conference (1923–1995)
- Western Athletic Conference (1996–2000)
- Conference USA (2001–2004)
- Mountain West Conference (2005–2011)
- Big East Conference (announced in 2010, reneged in 2011 in favor of the Big 12)
- Big 12 Conference (2012–present)

== Championships ==
=== National championships ===
TCU claims two national championships in college football, for 1935 and 1938. Both years, in addition to an un-claimed title in 2010, were awarded by contemporary NCAA-designated "major selectors" of national championships. In 1935, TCU spent most of the season ranked No. 1 in the country before losing a regular season game to then No. 2 ranked SMU in the "Game of the Century". SMU went on to lose to Stanford in the Rose Bowl, while TCU went on to beat LSU in the Sugar Bowl. TCU recognizes a statistical poll created by Paul O. Williamson who ranked TCU first in his final post-bowl rankings for the 1935 season. The 1938 team was undefeated and was the No. 1 team in the Associated Press Poll. The 2010 team topped the Congrove Computer Rankings, though the school does not claim this title. The Horned Frogs have also been awarded retroactive titles by AFCA through their Blue Ribbon Commission.

Year	Coach	Selectors	Record	Bowl	Opponent	Result	Final AP	Final Coaches
1935	Dutch Meyer	AFCA, Williamson System	12–1	Sugar Bowl	LSU	W 3–2	–	–
1938	Dutch Meyer	AFCA, AP Poll, Helms Athletic Foundation, National Championship Foundation, Williamson System	11–0	Sugar Bowl	Carnegie Tech	W 15–7	No. 1	–

=== Conference championships ===
TCU has won a combined 18 conference championships in six different conferences, with 12 outright and six shared.

Year	Conference	Coach	Overall record	Conference record
1920‡	TIAA	W. L. Driver	9–1	3–0
1929	Southwest Conference	Francis Schmidt	9–0–1	4–0–1
1932	Southwest Conference	Francis Schmidt	10–0–1	6–0
1938	Southwest Conference	Dutch Meyer	11–0	6–0
1944	Southwest Conference	Dutch Meyer	7–3–1	3–1–1
1951	Southwest Conference	Dutch Meyer	6–5	5–1
1955	Southwest Conference	Abe Martin	9–2	5–1
1958	Southwest Conference	Abe Martin	8–2–1	5–1
1959†	Southwest Conference	Abe Martin	8–3	5–1
1994†	Southwest Conference	Pat Sullivan	7–5	4–3
1999†	Western Athletic Conference	Dennis Franchione	8–4	5–2
2000†	Western Athletic Conference	Dennis Franchione	10–2	7–1
2002†	Conference USA	Gary Patterson	11–2	6–2
2005	Mountain West Conference	Gary Patterson	11–1	8–0
2009	Mountain West Conference	Gary Patterson	12–1	8–0
2010	Mountain West Conference	Gary Patterson	13–0	8–0
2011	Mountain West Conference	Gary Patterson	11–2	7–0

† Co-champions

‡ Note that the 1920 TIAA Championship was disputed between TCU and Austin College. Although TCU defeated the Kangaroos 9–7 on October 9, 1920, one of the TCU players, Allen Rowson, was declared ineligible after the 1920 season due to transfer rules.

== Bowl games ==
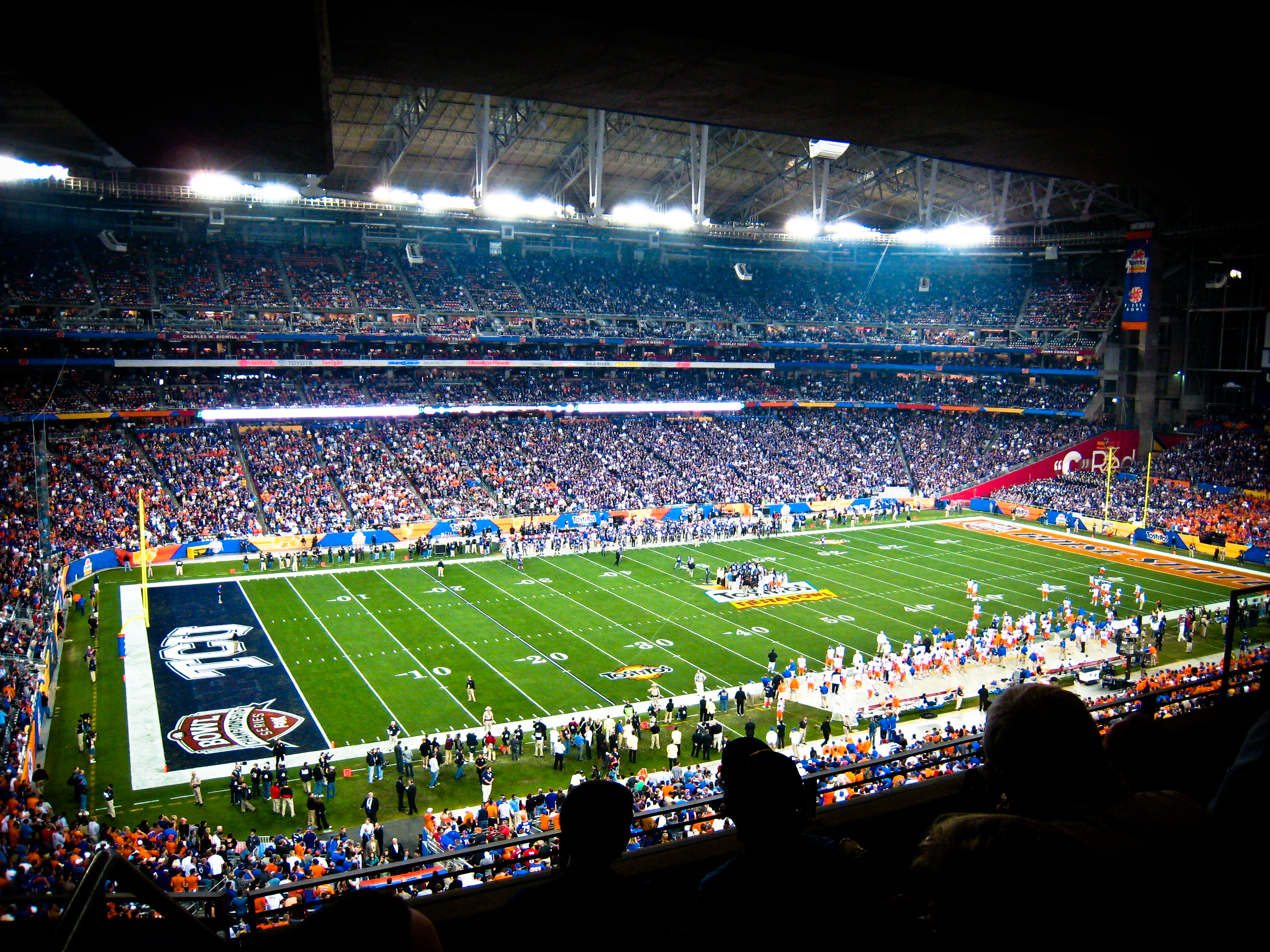
The 2010 Fiesta Bowl with Boise State against TCU

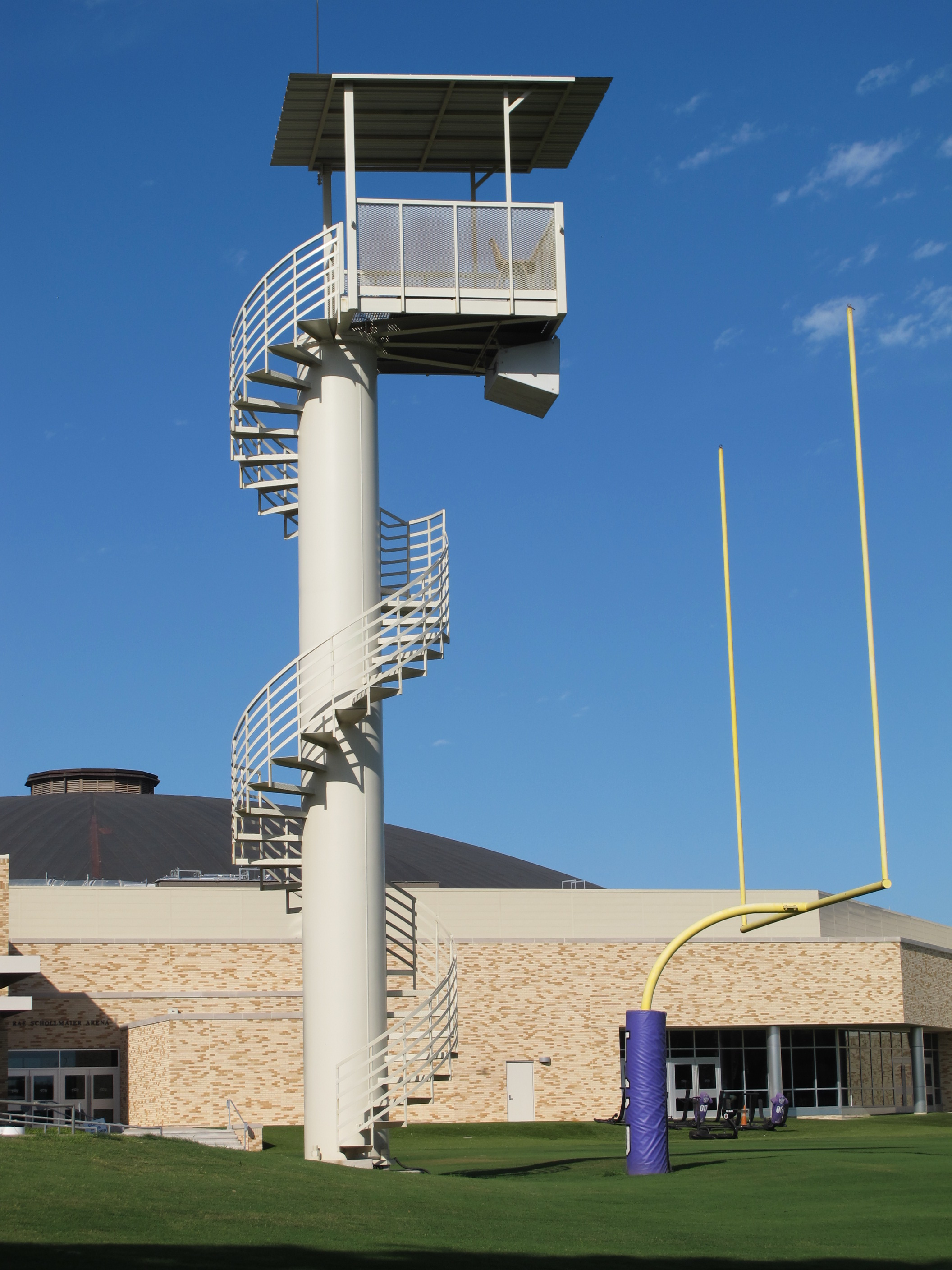
Sam Baugh Indoor Practice Facility, Practice Field

In 2014, TCU became just the fourth program in history to have competed in all six of the modern day CFP bowls (Rose, Fiesta, Sugar, Cotton, Peach and Orange). TCU joined Florida State, Miami (FL) and Tennessee as the only schools to have earned this distinction. TCU has a combined 6–5–1 record in those bowls, notching wins in all but the Orange.

Date	Coach	Bowl	Opponent	Result
January 1, 1921	William L. Driver	Fort Worth Classic	Centre College	L 7–63
January 1, 1936	Dutch Meyer	Sugar Bowl	LSU	W 3–2
January 1, 1937	Dutch Meyer	Cotton Bowl Classic	Marquette	W 16–6
January 2, 1939	Dutch Meyer	Sugar Bowl	Carnegie Tech	W 15–7
January 1, 1942	Dutch Meyer	Orange Bowl	Georgia	L 26–40
January 1, 1945	Dutch Meyer	Cotton Bowl Classic	Oklahoma A&M	L 0–34
January 1, 1948	Dutch Meyer	Delta Bowl	Ole Miss	L 9–13
January 1, 1952	Dutch Meyer	Cotton Bowl Classic	Kentucky	L 7–20
January 2, 1956	Abe Martin	Cotton Bowl Classic	Ole Miss	L 13–14
January 1, 1957	Abe Martin	Cotton Bowl Classic	Syracuse	W 28–27
January 1, 1959	Abe Martin	Cotton Bowl Classic	Air Force	T 0–0
December 19, 1959	Abe Martin	Bluebonnet Bowl	Clemson	L 7–23
December 31, 1965	Abe Martin	Sun Bowl	Texas Western	L 12–13
December 31, 1984	Jim Wacker	Bluebonnet Bowl	West Virginia	L 14–31
December 28, 1994	Pat Sullivan	Independence Bowl	Virginia	L 10–20
December 31, 1998	Dennis Franchione	Sun Bowl	USC	W 28–19
December 22, 1999	Dennis Franchione	Mobile Alabama Bowl	East Carolina	W 28–14
December 20, 2000	Gary Patterson	Mobile Alabama Bowl	Southern Miss	L 21–28
December 28, 2001	Gary Patterson	Galleryfurniture.com Bowl	Texas A&M	L 9–28
December 31, 2002	Gary Patterson	Liberty Bowl	Colorado State	W 17–3
December 23, 2003	Gary Patterson	Fort Worth Bowl	Boise State	L 31–34
December 31, 2005	Gary Patterson	Houston Bowl	Iowa State	W 27–24
December 19, 2006	Gary Patterson	Poinsettia Bowl	NIU	W 37–7
December 28, 2007	Gary Patterson	Texas Bowl	Houston	W 20–13
December 23, 2008	Gary Patterson	Poinsettia Bowl	Boise State	W 17–16
January 4, 2010	Gary Patterson	Fiesta Bowl †	Boise State	L 10–17
January 1, 2011	Gary Patterson	Rose Bowl †	Wisconsin	W 21–19
December 21, 2011	Gary Patterson	Poinsettia Bowl	Louisiana Tech	W 31–24
December 29, 2012	Gary Patterson	Buffalo Wild Wings Bowl	Michigan State	L 16–17
December 31, 2014	Gary Patterson	Peach Bowl †	Ole Miss	W 42–3
January 2, 2016	Gary Patterson	Alamo Bowl	Oregon	W 47–41
December 30, 2016	Gary Patterson	Liberty Bowl	Georgia	L 23–31
December 28, 2017	Gary Patterson	Alamo Bowl	Stanford	W 39–37
December 26, 2018	Gary Patterson	Cheez-It Bowl	California	W 10–7^{OT}
December 31, 2022	Sonny Dykes	Fiesta Bowl (CFP Semifinal) †	Michigan	W 51–45
January 9, 2023	Sonny Dykes	CFP National Championship †	Georgia	L 7–65
December 28, 2024	Sonny Dykes	New Mexico Bowl	Louisiana	W 34–3
December 30, 2025	Sonny Dykes	Alamo Bowl	USC	W 30–27^{OT}

† New Year's Six/BCS/CFP game

== Head coaches ==
List of TCU head coaches.

Years	Coach	Record	Pct.
1897	Joe J. Field	3–1	.750
1898	James Morrison	1–3–1	.300
1902	H. E. Hildebrand	0–5–1	.083
1904	C. E. Cronk	1–4–1	.250
1905–1907	Emory J. Hyde	10–11–2	.478
1908–1909	Jesse R. Langley	11–5–1	.676
1910	Kemp Lewis	2–6–1	.278
1911	Henry W. Lever	4–5	.444
1912	Willis T. Stewart	8–1	.889
1913	Fred Cahoon	5–2–1	.688
1914	Stanley A. Boles	4–4–2	.500
1915	Ewing Y. Freeland	4–5	.444
1916–1917	Milton Daniel	14–4–1	.763
1918	Ernest M. Tipton	4–4	.500
1919	Ted D. Hackney	1–7	.125
1920–1921	William L. Driver	15–4–1	.775
1922	John McKnight	2–5–3	.350
1923–1928	Matty Bell	33–17–5	.645
1929–1933	Francis Schmidt	46–6–5	.848
1934–1952	Dutch Meyer	109–79–13	.575
1953–1966	Abe Martin	74–64–7	.534
1967–1970	Fred Taylor	15–25–1	.378
1971	Jim Pittman	3–3–1	.500
1971–1973	Billy Tohill	11–15	.423
1974–1976	Jim Shofner	2–31	.061
1977–1982	F. A. Dry	12–51–3	.205
1983–1991	Jim Wacker	40–58–2	.410
1992–1997	Pat Sullivan	24–42–1	.366
1998–2000	Dennis Franchione	25–10	.714
2000–2021	Gary Patterson	181–79	.696
2022–present	Sonny Dykes	27–13	.675

== Rivalries ==
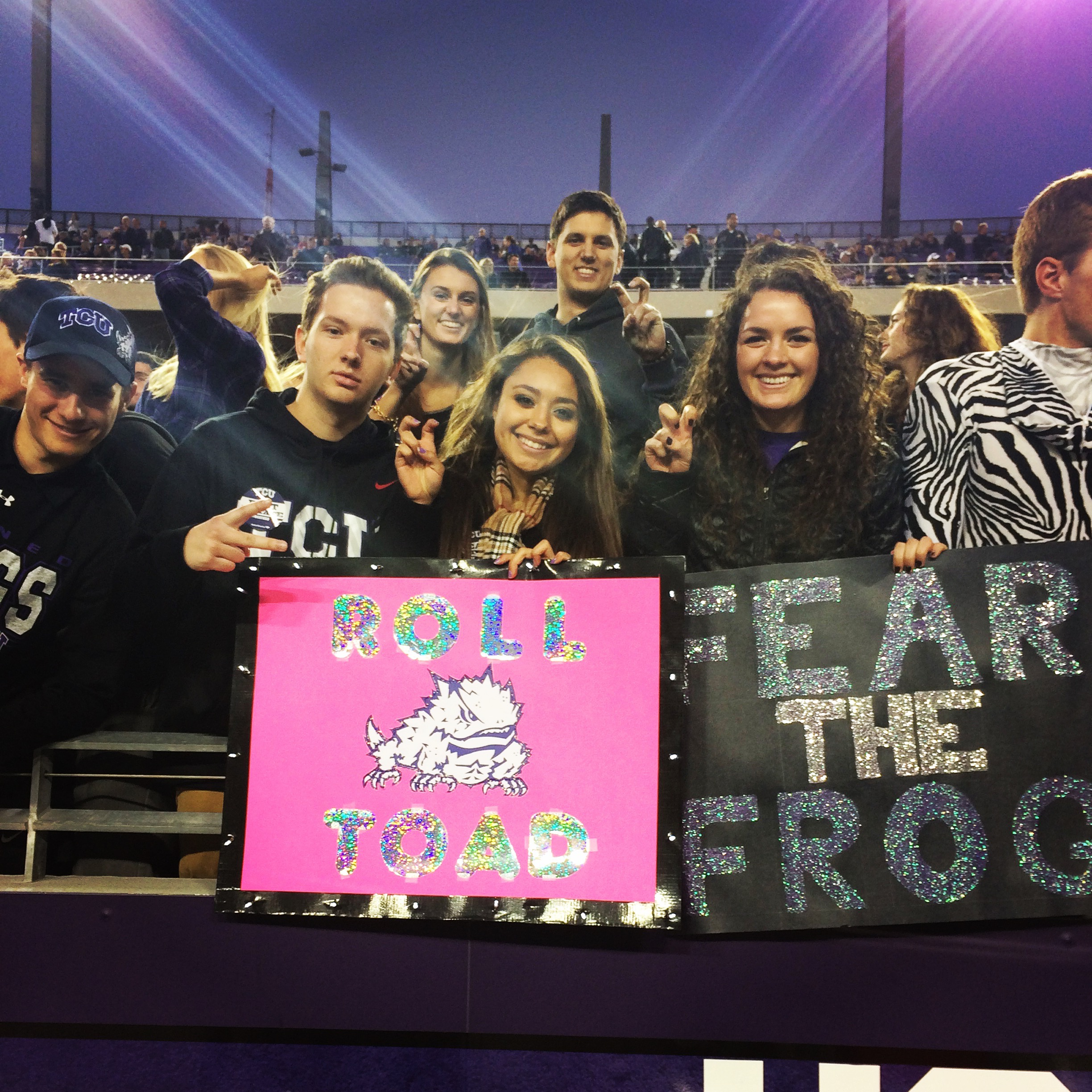
TCU students supporting the Horned Frogs against Kansas St on November 8, 2014

Because TCU was a member of the Southwest Conference for 72 years, rivalries remain with many of the schools that once participated in that conference. Most of the former Southwest Conference members are located within the state of Texas.

=== SMU ===
This rivalry with SMU is prominent for both schools, as both are located in the Dallas-Fort Worth Metroplex and were long-time members of the SWC before its dissolution. The SMU–TCU football game is called "The Battle for the Iron Skillet", with the winning team gaining possession of a ceremonial iron skillet. Since 1915, when SMU was founded and began football competition, the game had not been played in only four years when both fielded football teams—1919, 1920, 2006 and 2020.

TCU announced in 2023 that it would be pausing the annual rivalry game after the 2025 season.

TCU leads the series 54–43–7 through the 2025 season.

=== Baylor ===
The TCU-Baylor rivalry is one of the most-played rivalry games in college football, and the most played rivalry game in the state of Texas. At its inception, the rivalry was a battle of two cross-town, church affiliated rivals in Waco, Texas. When the main administration building at TCU was destroyed by fire in 1910, Baylor generously offered the use of its classrooms, libraries, and laboratories to the displaced TCU students. TCU eventually relocated to Fort Worth, Texas, but the rivalry between the two private universities continued.

Appropriately, given the more than century-long history of this highly-competitive rivalry, the first game between TCU and Baylor, played October 27, 1899, ended in a scoreless tie. Each school achieved various period of dominance between 1899 and the breakup of the Southwest Conference at the conclusion of the 1995 season, but at the time the Southwest Conference disbanded, the Bears held only a slight 49–47–7 advantage. After a 10-year, post-Southwest Conference breakup hiatus, the series was renewed for 4 non-conference games in 2006, 2007, 2010 and 2011. TCU, then a member of the Mountain West Conference, notched a 3–1 non-conference record over Baylor in these games.

The two became conference foes once again when TCU joined the Big 12 Conference in 2012, where the rivalry again became an annual staple. In 2014, the two played arguably the most memorable bout yet: A clash of undefeated teams with aspirations of qualifying for the first-ever College Football Playoff. Though TCU led for most of the first three quarters, Baylor stormed back in the fourth, scoring the final 24 points and shocking TCU, 61-58. Neither team would qualifying for the playoff that season. Since then, TCU has dominated the rivalry, winning ten of the next twelve matchups, and eleven of the fifteen overall in Big 12 play.

TCU leads the series 61-54-77 through the 2026 season.

=== Texas ===
Texas leads the series with TCU 65–28–1 through the 2023 season.

=== Texas Tech ===
The football series with Texas Tech dates to 1926. TCU was the first Southwest Conference team to play Texas Tech. The Texas Tech University Goin' Band from Raiderland was the first college marching band to travel to an away game when Will Rogers financed their trip to accompany the Red Raiders to Fort Worth.

After the collapse of the Southwest Conference, Texas Tech was the first of the schools that joined the Big 12 Conference in 1996 to schedule a non-conference game with TCU. This first post-Southwest Conference game between TCU and its former conference mate was played in the regular season in 2004. Prior to Texas Tech joining the SWC, a traveling trophy was exchanged between the Horned Frogs and Red Raiders. The trophy was of a miniature saddle and the game between the teams was dubbed "The West Texas Championship". TCU and Texas Tech return to being conference mates, competing in football annually, in 2012. In 2014, 109 points combined was put up, in an 82–27 rout by TCU.

Texas Tech leads the series 33–31–3 through the 2024 season.

== Home stadium ==
The Horned Frogs have played their home football games at Amon G. Carter Stadium, located on the campus of TCU, since 1930.

Named for the famous Fort Worth newspaper magnate who made the original donation to finance the stadium, Amon G. Carter Stadium opened in 1930 with an original seating capacity of 22,000. The first game played in the stadium was in October, a 70–6 TCU victory over the Arkansas Razorbacks. Renovations in 1947 and 1955 added additional seating and an upper deck, which increased capacity to 46,083. In 1991, the upper deck seats were replaced by aluminum bleachers, which reduced its capacity to 44,008, and the artificial turf was replaced by natural grass at the request of the new coaching staff. The stadium remained in this configuration until 2010, when a major renovation reduced the entire stadium to its original lower bowl, before erecting a new stadium on the same site. The design of the current Amon Carter stadium was influenced heavily by the surrounding architecture of Fort Worth, with emphasis on Art Deco style. The Frogs opened the new stadium in time for the 2012 season.

The new Amon G. Carter Stadium features a natural grass field and a seating capacity of 45,000. Standing-room only concourses allow capacity to exceed this number when ticket demand exceeds seating availability. The record attendance is 50,307 which took place on November 14, 2009, when the Frogs played the then No. 16 ranked Utah Utes. The final score was 55–28 in favor of the Frogs. The 2012 renovation added a 54 ft. video board over the North endzone, with a smaller videoboard located in the Southeast corner.

Before Amon G. Carter Stadium, the Horned Frogs played their home games on campus at Clark Field, located at the current site of Mary Couts Burnett Library.

== Uniforms ==
=== Colors ===
TCU's school colors are purple and white. Historically, black has also featured prominently in the school's uniforms. As early as 1935 the football team wore black leather helmets with a purple stripe, or occasionally purple helmets with a black stripe. Jerseys were purple with white numbers were, worn with beige or khaki pants.

Beginning with the introduction of plastic helmets in the 1946 TCU dropped black from their uniforms and introduced a new purple helmet with a white stripe. The team's pants remained khaki colored until the 1950s, when they were changed to white.

During this period the exact shade of TCU purple varied wildly depending on the uniforms worn, though a royal purple was most common. In 1971 the school hired Jim Pittman as its head coach. Pittman had been an assistant at the University of Texas when the Longhorns had changed their color from orange to burnt orange, and wanted to do something similar at TCU. Pittman chose to introduce a pale shade of lilac into the TCU uniforms, and the team quickly became known as the "Lavender Hill Mob". These uniforms are often regarded as the worst in TCU's history. TCU returned to a royal purple in 1974 following Pittman's death on the sidelines.

Beginning in 1998, TCU began once again incorporating black into the uniforms. The practice was started by Coach Franchione, who introduced a new helmet with black facemask, and purple jerseys with black pants. In 2012, the school debuted helmets which featured a black stripe in addition to the black facemask, reflecting the helmets worn during the TCU championship years of the 1930s. Several TCU helmets designs also feature a small red "blood stripe" in the middle of the central black stripe, a reference to how horned frogs can squirt blood from their eyes/forehead onto potential predators.

=== Helmets ===
TCU was the last school in college football to wear leather helmets, switching to hard plastic helmets in 1946. Prior to 1946, the TCU football team wore either black helmets with a purple stripe or purple helmets with a black stripe. Since the introduction of plastic, the TCU helmet has gone through a number of design changes.

In the 1950s, TCU wore a purple helmet with a white stripe down the middle. In 1954, a gray facemask was introduced, and in 1958, white numbers were added to the sides of the helmet.

In 1965, a new helmet was introduced featuring a purple shell and a white stylized Horned Frog on the side. A different, fiercer Horned Frog design was used for the 1966 helmets, featuring just the frog's head. In 1967, the school used a pattern similar to that of Texas A&M.

In 1977, the school introduced a "Flying TCU" logo, which remained on the helmets through the 1991 season. In 1992, new head coach Pat Sullivan introduced an arched TCU design, which eventually became the official logo of the school. This logo has been featured on most TCU helmets, sometimes with a white or gray horned frog underneath, ever since.

== Individual awards ==
=== Retired numbers ===
No.	Player	Pos.	Tenure	Year ret.	Ref.
5	LaDainian Tomlinson	RB	1997–2000	2005	
8	Davey O'Brien	QB	1935–38	1939	
45	Sammy Baugh	QB	1934–36	1993	

=== National awards ===
- Heisman Trophy winner

Davey O'Brien, 1938

- Heisman Trophy finalists

Sammy Baugh, 4th in 1936
Jim Swink, 2nd in 1955
Kenneth Davis, 5th in 1984
LaDainian Tomlinson, 4th in 2000
Trevone Boykin, 4th in 2014
Max Duggan, 2nd in 2022

- Maxwell Award

Davey O'Brien, 1938

- Doak Walker Award

LaDainian Tomlinson, 2000

- Rimington Trophy

Jake Kirkpatrick, 2010

- Nils V. "Swede" Nelson Award

Jim Swink, 1956

- Davey O'Brien Award

Max Duggan, 2022

- Lott Trophy

Jerry Hughes, 2009

- Ted Hendricks Award

Jerry Hughes, 2009

- Lou Groza Award

Michael Reeder, 1995

- Rudy Award

Drew Combs, 2008

- Jim Brown Trophy

LaDainian Tomlinson, 2000

- Kellen Moore Award

Trevone Boykin, 2014

- Earl Campbell Tyler Rose Award

Trevone Boykin, 2014
Max Duggan, 2022

- Jim Thorpe Award

Trevon Moehrig, 2020
Tre'Vius Hodges-Tomlinson, 2022

- Johnny Unitas Golden Arm Award

Max Duggan, 2022

- Jet Award

Derius Davis, 2022

=== Coaching awards ===
- Bobby Dodd Coach of the Year Award

Jim Wacker, 1984
Gary Patterson, 2009

- Walter Camp Coach of the Year

Gary Patterson, 2009, 2014
Sonny Dykes, 2022

- George Munger Award

Gary Patterson, 2009

- Eddie Robinson Coach of the Year

Gary Patterson, 2009, 2014
Sonny Dykes, 2022

- AFCA Coach of the Year

Gary Patterson, 2009, 2014

- Paul "Bear" Bryant Award

Gary Patterson, 2014
Sonny Dykes, 2022

- The Woody Hayes Trophy

Gary Patterson, 2009, 2014

- Sporting News College Football Coach of the Year

Jim Wacker, 1984
Gary Patterson, 2009, 2014
Sonny Dykes, 2022

- Associated Press College Football Coach of the Year Award

Gary Patterson, 2009, 2014
Sonny Dykes, 2022

- Liberty Mutual Coach of the Year Award

Gary Patterson, 2009

- Home Depot Coach of the Year Award

Gary Patterson, 2014
Sonny Dykes, 2022

- Broyles Award

Garrett Riley, 2022

=== College Football Hall of Fame inductees ===
The following Horned Frogs have been inducted into the College Football Hall of Fame:

- Ki Aldrich, C, 1960
- Sammy Baugh, QB, 1951
- Madison A. "Matty" Bell, Coach, 1955
- Darrell Lester, C, 1988
- Bob Lilly, T, 1981
- LaDainian Tomlinson, HB, 2014
- Rags Matthews, End, 1971
- Dutch Meyer, Coach, 1956
- Davey O'Brien, QB, 1955
- Francis Schmidt, Coach, 1971
- Jim Swink, HB, 1980
- Gary Patterson, Coach, 2026

=== AP First-Team All-Americans ===
Year	Position	Jersey #	Name	Hometown
1927	E	31	Rags Matthews	Fort Worth
1929	G	44	Mike Brumbelow	Jacksboro
1930	HB	5	Cy Leland	Lubbock
1932	G	44	Johnny Vaught	Fort Worth
1934	C	22	Darrell Lester	Jacksboro
1935	C	22	Darrell Lester	Jacksboro
1935	QB	45	Sammy Baugh	Sweetwater
1936	QB	45	Sammy Baugh	Sweetwater
1937	QB	8	Davey O'Brien	Dallas
1937	T	22	I. B. Hale	Dallas
1937	C	48	Ki Aldrich	Temple
1938	QB	8	Davey O'Brien	Dallas
1938	T	22	I. B. Hale	Dallas
1938	C	48	Ki Aldrich	Temple
1942	T	71	Derrell Palmer	Albany
1944	T	32	Clyde Flowers	Perryton
1949	QB	43	Lindy Berry	Wichita Falls
1951	C	34	Keith Flowers	Perryton
1951	QB	49	Ray McKown	Dumas
1951	T	77	Doug Conaway	Hillsboro
1955	HB	23	Jim Swink	Rusk
1955	C	54	Hugh Pitts	Dumas
1956	T	75	Norman Hamilton	Vanderbilt
1956	HB	23	Jim Swink	Rusk
1958	T	75	Don Floyd	Midlothian
1958	FB	20	Jack Spikes	Snyder
1960	T	72	Bob Lilly	Throckmorton
1963	FB	38	Tommy Crutcher	McKinney
1981	WR	7	Stanley Washington	Dallas
1984	RB	36	Kenneth Davis	Temple
1991	TE	86	Kelly Blackwell	Richland Hills
1995	K	17	Michael Reeder	Sulphur, LA
2000	RB	5	LaDainian Tomlinson	Waco
2002	LB	44	LaMarcus McDonald	Waco
2003	K	9	Nick Browne	Garland
2005	KR	17	Cory Rodgers	Houston
2009	DE	98	Jerry Hughes	Sugar Land
2010	S	3	Tejay Johnson	Garland
2014	LB	47	Paul Dawson	Dallas
2015	WR	9	Josh Doctson	Mansfield
2022	CB	1	Tre'Vius Hodges-Tomlinson	Waco

Note: Unless otherwise indicated, all hometowns are in Texas.

== Future non-conference opponents ==
Announced schedules as of September 9, 2026.

2026	2027	2028	2029	2030
vs North Carolina^{1}	Alcorn State	Louisiana	Southeastern Louisiana	Purdue
Grambling State	North Texas	Northwestern State	Duke	
Arkansas State	Sam Houston	at Duke	Texas State	

1. Dublin, Ireland; Aer Lingus College Football Classic

== Horned Frogs in professional football ==
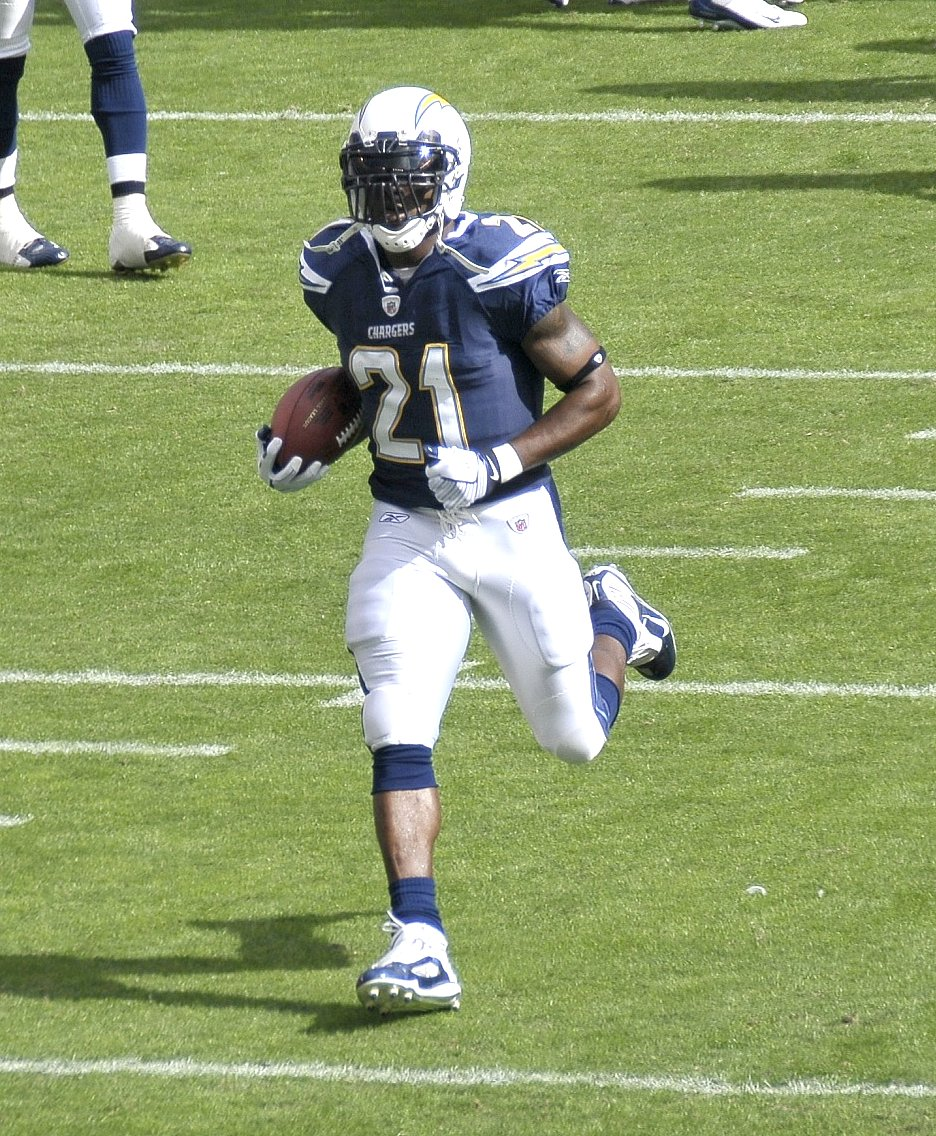
LaDainian Tomlinson with the Chargers

=== Pro Football Hall of Fame inductees ===
- Sammy Baugh, QB (1963) Washington Redskins 1937–1952
- Bob Lilly, DT (1980) Dallas Cowboys 1961–1974
- LaDainian Tomlinson, RB (2017) San Diego Chargers 2001–2009 New York Jets 2010–2011

=== National Football League Most Valuable Player award ===
- LaDainian Tomlinson, RB (2006) San Diego Chargers

=== Super Bowl Most Valuable Player award ===
- Larry Brown, CB (1996) Dallas Cowboys

=== Canadian Football League Most Outstanding Player award ===
- Casey Printers, QB (2004) BC Lions

=== Grey Cup Most Valuable Player award ===
- Jason Tucker, WR (2003) Edmonton Eskimos

=== Horned Frogs in the NFL ===
As of September 2, 2021, there are 20 former TCU Football players on NFL active rosters.

- Ben Banogu, DE Indianapolis Colts
- Ross Blacklock, DT Minnesota Vikings
- Marcus Cannon, OT New England Patriots
- L.J. Collier, DE Seattle Seahawks
- Andy Dalton, QB Carolina Panthers
- Travin Howard, LB Los Angeles Rams
- Jerry Hughes, OLB Houston Texans
- Joey Hunt, C Seattle Seahawks
- Trevon Moehrig, S Las Vegas Raiders
- Lucas Niang, OT Kansas City Chiefs
- Joseph Noteboom, OT Los Angeles Rams
- KaVontae Turpin, WR Dallas Cowboys
- Matt Pryor, G Indianapolis Colts
- Jalen Reagor, WR New England Patriots
- Innis Gaines, DB Green Bay Packers
- Ty Summers, LB Jacksonville Jaguars
- Halapoulivaati Vaitai, OT Detroit Lions
- Jason Verrett, CB San Francisco 49ers
- Garret Wallow, LB Houston Texans
- Ar'Darius Washington, S Baltimore Ravens
