= History of UTEP Miners football =

History of American college football team

The history of UTEP Miners football covers 111 seasons since the team first represented the then-State College of Mines and Metallurgy in 1914.

== Overview ==
=== Early history (1914–1964) ===
The State College of Mines and Metallurgy fielded its first football team in 1914, under the direction of head coach Tommy Dwyer, who led the team until 1917. Head coach Harry Van Surdam took over the reins of the Miners in 1920, the same year the school changed its name to the College of Mines and Metallurgy of the University of Texas. Former Texas head coach E. J. Stewart led the Miners football program from 1927 to 1928, compiling a 5–6–3 record during those two seasons. Mack Saxon served as the head football coach of the Miners from 1929 to 1941, compiling a record of 66–43–9, making him the winningest head coach in program history. He led the Miners to three 7–1 seasons. Saxon led the Miners, an NCAA Division I-A independent for its entire 21-year history to that point, into the Border Conference in 1935. Saxon's 1936 team lost 34–6 to Hardin–Simmons in the 1937 Sun Bowl, the only bowl game to which his teams were invited. Jack Curtice had a successful run as the Miners head coach from 1946 to 1949, compiling a record of 24–13–3, which included back to back 8–2–1 campaigns during his final two years. It was in 1949 that the College of Mines and Metallurgy of the University of Texas changed its name to Texas Western College. Curtice left the Miners to accept the position of head coach for Utah after the 1949 season.

In June 1950, Mike Brumbelow was hired as the head football coach and athletic director at Texas Western. He had been operating sporting goods stores at Midland and Odessa, Texas (in partnership with Tex Carleton) at the time of his hiring at UTEP. Brumbelow served as head football coach at UTEP from 1950 to 1956. He had a successful tenure as coach, guiding his teams to a 46–24–3 record. The team won eight or more games three times, in 1953, 1954 and 1956. He led UTEP to appearances in the 1954 Sun Bowl, 1955 Sun Bowl, and 1957 Sun Bowl, two of which UTEP won. Brumbelow retired as UTEP's football coach in July 1957 and as athletic director in 1959. He retired as the school's second winningest head football coach and held that distinction until he was surpassed by Mike Price in 2012. Brumbelow was inducted into El Paso Athletic Hall of Fame in 1964, and the UTEP Athletic Hall of Fame in 2007. Ben Collins was promoted from assistant coach to head coach following Brumbelow's retirement. Under his tutelage, the Miners compiled a record of 18–29–1. He also succeeded Brumbelow as athletics director. Collins resigned after multiple losing seasons at the helm of Miners football. Bum Phillips came to Texas Western from Amarillo High School and led the Miners for one season, a 4–5 campaign in 1962. He left the Miners to return to the high school ranks with Port Neches–Groves High School in 1963. Texas Western again returned to the high school ranks to find a head football coach in 1963, this time nabbing Warren Harper from Sherman High School. However, after two seasons and a 3–15–2 overall record, the Miners athletics administration relieved Harper of his head coaching duties.

=== Bobby Dobbs era (1965–1973) ===
Former Tulsa head coach Bobby Dobbs came to Texas Western from the CFL's Calgary Stampeders. In addition the head coaching stints in the CFL and Tulsa, Dobbs played fullback for an Army program under Earl Blaik that won consecutive national championships in 1944 and 1945.

In his first season as the Miners head coach, Dobbs turned a 0–8–2 team into an 8–3 that defeated powerhouse North Texas 61–15 in the season opener and beat TCU 13–12 in the 1965 Sun Bowl. In the season's second game, the Miners defeated New Mexico by a score of 35–14. Dobb's team then defeated New Mexico State by a score of 21–6 and Colorado State by a score of 35–10. The Miners then lost their next three to Wyoming, Arizona State and Arizona. They broke their three-game skid by defeating Utah by a close 20–19. They followed that with a 57–33 win over I-AA opponent Xavier. The Miners finished off the 1965 season with a 38–21 win over I-AA West Texas A&M and the 13–12 Sun Bowl win over TCU.

In April 1966, Dobbs turned down an offer from his alma mater to succeed Paul Dietzel as Army head coach due to his wife, Joanne's illness that required her to stay in the warm climate in El Paso. The Miners went 6–4 in 1966. They began the season with a 30–26 loss to Arizona State on September 17. After losing to North Texas the following week by a score of 12–9, Dobb's team responded with four straight victories; 51–3 over New Mexico, 9–3 over West Texas A&M, 68–21 over I-AA opponent Texas–Arlington and a 35–0 shutout over San Jose State. Texas Western then lost consecutive games to BYU and Wyoming. Dobbs led his team to two wins to close the season; a 28–14 win over archrival New Mexico State and a 27–20 victory over Utah.

In 1967, Texas Western College changed its name to the University of Texas at El Paso. Dobbs' football team led the nation in passing and scoring that season, losing its two games by a total of three points. They finished the season with a 7–2–1 record. UTEP kicked off the season with a 50–14 thrashing of I-AA foe UC Santa Barbara. After a narrow 33–32 loss to Arizona State, the Miners tied Arizona at 9–9. Dobbs' Miners then won their next four, defeating BYU 47–17, scoring a school-record 75 points in a 75–12 rout of New Mexico (during which UTEP quarterback Brooks Dawson threw for six touchdown passes on his first six pass attempts of the game), a 46–24 win over New Mexico State and a 17–0 shutout of Colorado State. After losing to No. 6 Wyoming by a score of 21–19, the Miners closed the regular season with a 28–8 win over Utah. UTEP accepted a berth in the 1967 Sun Bowl on its home turf, defeating Ole Miss by a score of 14–7.

Dobbs led the Miners into the Western Athletic Conference in 1968, ending its seven-year run as an independent. The Miners compiled a 4–5–1 record that year. UTEP tied I-AA UC Santa Barbara by a score of 14–14 in the season opener. After defeating New Mexico by a score of 44–15 on September 21, UTEP lost three straight to No. 19 Arizona State, Arizona in a shutout, and I-AA opponent Long Beach State. The Miners won their next two over New Mexico State 30–14 and BYU 31–25. After losses to North Texas and No. 20 Wyoming, Texas El-Paso defeated Colorado State in the season's final game by a score of 23–19.

Texas El-Paso finished 4–6 in 1969. The Miners began the season by defeating I-AA foe Pacific and New Mexico. UTEP then lost its next four to Utah, No. 18 Wyoming, Arizona and BYU. After defeating Colorado State by a nail-biting 17–16, the Miners lost to New Mexico State and Arizona State before defeating Xavier by a score of 17–10 in the season finale. They improved to 6–4 in 1970. Dobb's squad lost their first two out of the gate to Pacific and Utah. The Miners rebounded to record wins over BYU (17–0), New Mexico State (21–14) and Colorado State (41–37). After losing to No. 12 Arizona State and New Mexico, Dobbs led his team to three wins in the season's final three games; defeating Wyoming by a score of 42–7, Arizona by a score of 33–17 and mid-major Trinity by a score of 37–16.

The Miners finished 5–6 in 1971. They began the season with a 38–9 win over Texas–Arlington and a 21–3 win over Pacific. UTEP then lost three in a row; 14–6 to Arizona 24–7 to No. 13 Arizona State and 32–10 to Utah. UTEP then defeated New Mexico State by a score of 14–7 and Wyoming by a score of 12–7. BYU shut out UTEP 16–0 on October 30. That was followed by losses of 49–13 to New Mexico and 24–7 to Colorado State. Texas-El Paso completed the 1971 season with a 38–32 win over I-AA Long Beach State on November 27.

Many of Dobbs' players went to the pro ranks including Fred Carr, Billy Stevens, Ron Jones, and Leon Harden to the Green Bay Packers to play for Vince Lombardi. At one point, Dobbs ranked second to only Bear Bryant among college coaches in number of players going in the National Football League. In 1972, Bobby Dobbs said that if his 1–5 team didn't beat New Mexico, he would resign. The team lost and Dobbs resigned. Dobbs compiled a 41–35–2 record at UTEP in seven full seasons and a partial eighth. Tommy Hudspeth was promoted form offensive coordinator to head coach for the 1973 following Dobbs' resignation. In his first season, the Miners freefell to 0–11, which led to Hudspeth's firing after just one full season as Miners head coach.

=== Gil Bartosh era (1974–1976) ===
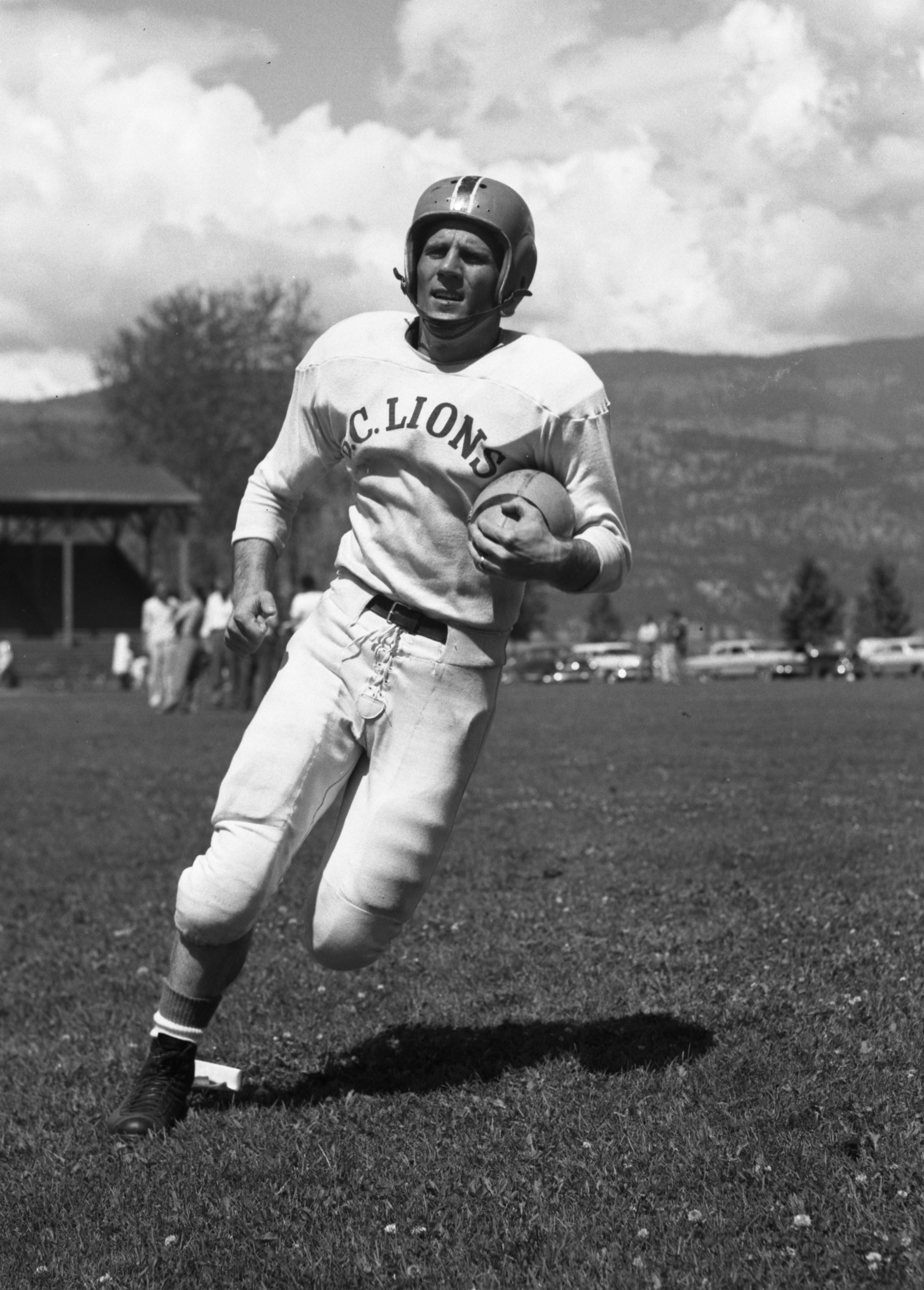
Gil Bartosh

The Miners struggles continued under head coach Gil Bartosh, who came to El Paso from his post as running backs coach at Texas A&M under Emory Bellard. The Miners compiled a record of 6–28 before Bartosh was fired by a frustrated athletics administration desperate for sustained success.

In 1974, the Miners finished 4–7. After losing to Pacific to open the season, UTEP defeated Utah in their second game to earn its first win of the season. Bartosh's squad then lost their next four to San Diego State, No. 12 Arizona, New Mexico State and BYU. UTEP then won its next three over Texas–Arlington, No. 14 Arizona State and Wyoming. The Miners lost their last two games of the season to Colorado State and New Mexico. UTEP finished 1–10 in 1975. After losing to San Diego State and New Mexico State to start the season, the Miners gained their only win of the season in their third game over East Tennessee State by a score of 6–3. UTEP lost to Pacific, No. 17 Arizona, Wyoming, No. 11 Arizona State, New Mexico, Colorado State Hawaii and BYU to close the season. In 1976, Bartosh led the Miners to a 1–11 record. The Miners defeated Texas–Arlington to start the season but lost its last 11 games of the season to New Mexico State, New Mexico, Utah, Arizona, Arizona State, Colorado State, San Diego State, BYU, Wyoming, Hawaii and No. 14 Oklahoma State.

=== Bill Michael era (1977–1981) ===
UTEP turned to Oklahoma offensive line coach Bill Michael, the Miners' defensive coordinator from 1964 to 1966, to right the ship. However, the struggles continued. Under his tutelage, the Miners compiled a 5–43 record, with no more than two wins coming in a single season. Michael was relieved of his duties as head coach two games into the 1981 season, with assistant coach Billy Alton leading the Miners as interim head coach for the remainder of the season. In 1977, the UTEP Miners went 1–10. Michael's squad began the season with three losses; dropping contests to North Texas, Wyoming and Oklahoma State. The Miners picked up their only win of the season in the season's fourth game against rival New Mexico State. UTEP closed the season by losing its last seven to Colorado State, San Diego State, Arizona State, New Mexico, Utah, Arizona and No. 18 BYU. Michael led his team to a 1–11 record in his second season. Like the previous season, the UTEP Miners dropped their first three games of the season; losing to North Texas, Air Force and New Mexico State. After defeating San Diego State by a score of 31–24 to record its first win of the season, Texas El-Paso lost its last eight of the season to Arizona State, Colorado State, BYU, New Mexico, Hawaii, Utah, UNLV and Wyoming. UTEP compiled a 2–9 mark in 1979, their best season under Michael. After losing the season opener by a score of 35–0 to North Texas, the Miners defeated Pacific by a score of 31–7. After losing a nailbiter to New Mexico State by a score of 14–13, Michael's squad defeated UNLV by a score of 17–15 to record what would be their last win of the season. UTEP finished the season on a seven-game losing streak; losing to BYU, Wyoming, Colorado State, New Mexico, Hawaii, Utah and San Diego State. The Miners finished 1–11 in 1980. UTEP lost to Texas Tech, New Mexico State, North Texas and Pacific. After defeating Hawaii by a score of 34–14, the Miners finished with losses to Utah, UNLV, New Mexico, No. 17 BYU (by a whopping 83–7), Colorado State, San Diego State and Wyoming. In 1981, the UTEP Miners finished 1–11. After losing to New Mexico State and Texas A&M Kingsville to kick off the season, Bill Michael was fired as head coach and assistant coach Billy Alton was named interim head coach for the remainder of the season. UTEP then lost to No. 13 BYU by a score of 65–8. The Miners dropped games to Utah, New Mexico and Wyoming before defeating Colorado State by a score of 35–29 to earn its first win of the season. Texas-El Paso closed the year with four straight losses to Arizona, Hawaii, San Diego State and UNLV.

=== Bill Yung era (1982–1985) ===
Bill Yung came to UTEP after a mediocre stint as West Texas State's head coach. He also served as offensive coordinator at Baylor from 1974 to 1976 under Grant Teaff. Yung brought with him extensive recruiting ties in west Texas, an up-tempo and pass-oriented Air raid offense with offensive coordinator Hal Mumme and a renewed spirit of optimism that things would get turned around, but unfortunately they didn't. Yung's record was 7–39 in four seasons. Yung was fired after a 1–10 campaign in 1985.

Yung led the Miners to a 2–10 record in his first season. The Yung era began with a victory over rival New Mexico State by a score of 20–17. UTEP then lost consecutive top 10-ranked opponents over the next two weeks, losing to both No. 2 Washington by a score of 55–0 and No. 6 SMU by a score of 31–10. Losses to Hawaii, BYU, UNLV, No. 10 Arizona State, Air Force, Colorado State, New Mexico and Utah before defeating Wyoming by a score of 39–32 in the season finale. The Miners posted another 2–10 mark in 1983. UTEP began the season like it did the season before, defeating New Mexico State. Texas El-Paso then embarked on a ten-game losing streak, beginning with an embarrassing 12–10 defeat at the hands of I-AA foe Idaho State. Yung's squad then lost to Baylor by a score of 20–6. Losses to San Diego State, Wyoming, Utah, Air Force, Colorado State, Hawaii, No. 12 BYU and New Mexico followed before the Miners defeated I-AA foe Weber State by a score of 40–34 in the season finale. Texas El-Paso went 2–9 in 1984. Yung's Miners kicked off the season by nearly upsetting Texas A&M, losing to the Aggies by a score of 20–17. After defeating Idaho State and avenging the previous season's loss to the Bengals, UTEP suffered another long losing streak, beginning with a 51–2 loss to San Diego State. UTEP then suffered defeats at the hands of New Mexico, New Mexico State, Hawaii, Utah, No. 4 BYU and Colorado State. UTEP broke its seven-game losing streak by defeating Wyoming by a score of 35–22 in the season's second-to-last game. Yung's team lost to Air Force by a score of 38–12 to wrap up the 1984 campaign.

Yung's last season in 1985 produced a 1–10 record. UTEP lost to Air Force, No. 3 SMU, Colorado State, New Mexico State, Utah and Kent State. Then, the Miners pulled one of the greatest upsets in college football history. No. 7 BYU came to El Paso to face the Miners and were overwhelming 35-point favorites to win the game. To illustrate the disparity between the two college football programs, the Miners entered the contest with just 14 wins over the previous 11 seasons while the Cougars had won 13 games the previous season alone and 30 of their previous 31. Five years after suffering one of the most lopsided defeats in NCAA history in an 83–7 crushing to BYU, the UTEP Miners defeated the Cougars by a score of 23–16. The Miners used an unusual strategy on defense, rushing only two and dropping nine defensive players into coverage and, as a result, held BYU quarterback Robbie Bosco to career low passing numbers. UTEP fans stormed the field and tore down the goalposts after the win, considered to be the biggest in school history. The celebration would be short lived, as the Miners lost their remaining four games of the 1985 season; dropping contests to New Mexico, Hawaii, San Diego State and Wyoming. UTEP athletics director Bill Cords decided to dismiss Yung as head coach after the completion of the 1985 season.

=== Bob Stull era (1986–1988) ===
UMass head coach Bob Stull was chosen as Yung's replacement in 1986. Stull turned around a struggling Minutemen football program in two years and also served as an assistant coach under Don James at Kent State and Washington for a dozen years, including as offensive coordinator for the Huskies from 1979 to 1983.

In Stull's first season (1986), the Miners compiled a 4–8 record, the most wins compiled by Texas-El Paso in a single season since 1974. The team's best player was quarterback Sammy Garza, who set numerous school passing records during his career with the Miners. Stull era began with a 64–29 thrashing of I-AA opponent Northern Michigan. The Miners suffered a 23–21 loss to Air Force on a go-ahead field goal with under one minute remaining in the fourth quarter in their second game of the 1986 season. UTEP defeated New Mexico State by a score of 47–33 in their third game. The Miners then lost their next seven; Hawaii by a score of 31–21, No. 15 Iowa by a score of 69–7, Tennessee by a score of 26–16, New Mexico by a score of 24–22, San Diego State by a score of 15–10, BYU by a score of 37–13 and Wyoming by a score of 41–12. The Miners closed with victories over Colorado State and Utah, UTEP compiled a 7–4 record in 1987, their first winning season since 1970. UTEP began the season with three wins; defeating New Mexico State, Colorado State and Hawaii. UTEP then suffered its first loss of the season to No. 13 Arizona State. Stull's squad rebounded to win their next two over San Diego State and I-AA foe Lamar. The Miners then lost to Air Force by a score of 35–7. UTEP then defeated New Mexico and Utah. UTEP lost to BYU and Wyoming to finish the season.

In 1988, the Miners had the best season in their program's history, compiling a 10–3 record (the most wins in a single season ever in UTEP history). The season began with wins over I-AA foes Mankato State and Weber State. UTEP then lost a heartbreaker to BYU by a score of 31–27. Stull's Miners then reeled off six straight wins, defeating Tulsa by a score of 27–24, Utah by a score of 38–28, Hawaii by a score of 42–25, Colorado State by a score of 34–14, New Mexico in a shutout of 37–0 and New Mexico State by a score of 42–9. Texas-El Paso suffered a 51–6 beating at the hands of No. 10 Wyoming in their tenth game of the season. UTEP finished the regular season with wins over San Diego State and Air Force. The Miners were invited to the Independence Bowl in Shreveport, Louisiana to face Southern Miss, a game the Miners lost to the Brett Favre-quarterbacked Golden Eagles by a score of 38–18. The Independence Bowl was the Miners' first bowl appearance in 21 years. 1988 was the best statistical season in Miners football history. Stull accepted the head football coach position at Missouri after the 1988 season. He left El Paso with a 21–15 record. Stull was the first Miners head coach to leave with a winning record since Bobby Dobbs in 1972. Stull returned to the University of Texas at El Paso to serve as athletics director in 1998.

=== David Lee era (1989–1993) ===
Following Stull's departure, UTEP initially pursued Idaho head coach Keith Gilbertson, but after consideration, Gilbertson opted not to take the UTEP job and remain with the Vandals. David Lee left his post as offensive coordinator at Arkansas to take his first head coaching position. Lee was a respected offensive mind who had served as an assistant coach under the likes of Steve Sloan at Vanderbilt and Ole Miss and Ken Hatfield at Arkansas. Lee, however, was unable to continue the momentum generated by his predecessor, Bob Stull, compiling an 11–41–1 record in four full seasons and a partial fifth.

The drop-off was evident almost immediately, as Lee led the Miners to a 2–10 mark in his first season. UTEP began the season losing to Tulsa by a score of 23–14 and I-AA foe Lamar by a score of 21–19. Texas El-Paso earned their first win of the season in their third game of the season in a 29–27 victory over New Mexico State. The Miners then lost their next three to Air Force, No. 8 Arkansas and Utah. Lee's squad then defeated New Mexico by a score of 26–7 to earn what would be their last win of the season. UTEP closed the 1989 season by losing five straight; to No. 21 BYU by a score of 49–24, to San Diego State by a score of 34–31, to Hawaii by a score of 26–7, a shutout to Colorado State by a score of 52–0 and in the season finale to Wyoming by a score of 41–10. The Miners went 3–8 in 1990. Lee's team began the season by losing 30–10 to BYU. After defeating New Mexico State by a score of 27–24, the Miners were shut out by No. 7 Tennessee to the tune of 56–0. After losing to Colorado State by a score of 38–20, Texas El-Paso defeated I-AA foe Sam Houston State by a score of 17–10. Lee's squad lost to New Mexico by a score of 48–28 on October 6. After beating Hawaii by a score of 12–10 the next week, UTEP finished the season with four straight losses; dropping games to Utah, No. 18 Wyoming, Air Force and San Diego State.

UTEP slightly improved to a 4–7–1 record in 1991. The Miners began the season by defeating New Mexico by a score of 35–19. After losing to Baylor by a score of 27–7, the Miners either won or tied their next three; defeating New Mexico State by a score of 22–21, defeating I-AA opponent Northwestern State by a score of 14–0 and tied Wyoming at 28 apiece. Lee's team then embarked on a four-game losing streak; dropping games to Colorado State, BYU on a blocked field goal with under a minute remaining, San Diego State and Air Force. After defeating Hawaii by a score of 41–24, UTEP finished with losses to Utah and Louisiana Tech. In 1992, Lee led the Miners to a 1–10 record. UTEP began the season with six straight losses; falling to BYU in the opener by a score of 38–28, UNLV by a score of 19–17, New Mexico State by a score of 30–24, Air Force by a score of 28–22, Colorado State by a score of 42–24 (after Lee suspended six players Miners for missing curfew the night before the game) and San Diego State by a score of 49–27. UTEP defeated Utah by a score of 20–13 to earn what would be its only win of the season on October 24. Lee's squad then lost its last four to close the season; falling to Hawaii, Tulsa, New Mexico and Fresno State. UTEP finished 1–11 in 1993. The Miners kicked off the season by losing to No. 13 Arizona by a score of 24–6. The next week, Texas-El Paso won what would be its only game of the season, defeating UNLV by a score of 41–24. The Miners then lost to New Mexico State, Hawaii in a shutout 52–0, No. 16 North Carolina by a score of 45–39, Wyoming by a score of 33–26 and Utah by a score of 45–29. After the Utah game, athletics director John Thompson fired David Lee as head coach and named defensive coordinator Charlie Bailey interim head coach. The results didn't improve, however, as UTEP finished the season under Bailey with five more losses; falling to Air Force by a score of 31–10, Fresno State by a score of 30–10, Colorado State in a shutout 52–0, New Mexico by a score of 35–29 and BYU by a score of 47–16.

=== Charlie Bailey era (1994–1999) ===
Despite going 0–5 as UTEP's interim head coach, John Thompson removed the interim tag and named Charlie Bailey the permanent head coach of Miners football in early 1994. Bailey had a background as an aggressive defensive play-caller and had compiled a 12–20–1 record as head coach at Memphis from 1986 to 1988 before NCAA infractions that occurred under his watch came to light, resulting in his dismissal. Bailey failed to find success with UTEP, failing to compile one winning record in six seasons with an overall mark of 19–53–2.

UTEP went 3–7–1 in 1994. The Bailey era began with a 36–13 loss to Wyoming on September 3. UTEP defeated Eastern Illinois by a score of 22–20 the second week of the season. In the season's third game, the Miners lost a nail biter to rival New Mexico State by a score of 23–22 before suffering another defeat by a score of 47–7 at the hands of Air Force. Bailey's team won its next two over Hawaii and Tulsa. UTEP then lost to three consecutive ranked opponents; falling to No. 13 Colorado State by a score of 47–9, No. 21 BYU by a score of 34–28 and No. 12 Utah by a score of 52–7. After tying Fresno State at 30–30, the Miners concluded the season with a 25–21 loss to New Mexico. The Miners finished 2–10 in 1995. UTEP allowed 45 points in each of their first two games, both losses to New Mexico State and Arizona State. Bailey's squad defeated I-AA opponent Valdosta State, a team coached by former UTEP offensive coordinator Hal Mumme, by a score of 34–24 in their third game of the 1995 season. The Miners then embarked upon a seven-game losing streak; falling to Hawaii, Utah, Air Force, Tulsa, San Diego State, Colorado State and Fresno State. UTEP snapped their losing streak with a 17–12 victory over New Mexico on November 18. Texas-El Paso finished the season with a 42–19 loss to Wyoming. UTEP finished 2–9 in 1996. The Miners began the season with a 23–3 loss to Arizona. Bailey's Miners then defeated rival New Mexico State by a score of 14–7. UTEP then lost a nail biter to San Jose State by a score of 26–25. Texas El-Paso then defeated Northern Illinois by a score of 37–6. They would finish the season on a seven-game losing streak; falling to No. 24 Utah, TCU, Rice, No. 13 BYU, SMU in a 30–0 shutout, Tulsa and New Mexico.

Bailey led the Miners to a 4–7 record in 1997. UTEP began the season in Baton Rouge, Louisiana for a showdown against No. 10 LSU, a contest the Miners lost to the Tigers by a score of 55–3. The team followed the LSU loss with losses to New Mexico and Utah. They picked up their first win of the season on September 27 with a 24–16 victory over New Mexico State, snapping their ten-game losing streak. Bailey's team would alternate between wins and losses for the remainder of the season; losing to Clemson by a score of 39–7, beating Tulsa by a score of 33–18, falling to San Jose State by a score of 10–7, upsetting BYU by a score of 14–3 for their first win over the Cougars since the notorious 1985 shocker, losing to SMU by a score of 28–14, upsetting TCU by a score of 24–17 and suffering a defeat at the hands of Rice by a score of 31–13. In 1998, UTEP went 3–8. They began the season 0–4 with losses to Texas Tech, No. 24 Oregon, New Mexico State and Colorado State. The Miners defeated New Mexico and San Jose State to improve to 2–4 at the halfway point of the season. Bailey's squad suffered a 32–6 defeat to Fresno State on October 24. After defeating Hawaii by a score of 30–13, they closed the season with losses to Utah, BYU and San Diego State.

Texas El-Paso finished 5–7 in 1999, their best record during the Bailey era. Bailey led his team to a 54–23 win over rival New Mexico State on September 25. UTEP finished the season with a 52–24 blowout loss to TCU as Horned Frogs running back LaDainian Tomlinson rushed for an NCAA-record 406 yards and six touchdowns against the Miner defense. After the completion of the 1999 season, Charlie Bailey announced his resignation as UTEP head coach, citing exhaustion and a desire to spend more time with his family.

=== Gary Nord era (2000–2003) ===
Athletics director Bob Stull decided to promote Gary Nord from offensive coordinator to head coach after Bailey's resignation. A native of Louisville, Kentucky, Nord played tight end for the Cardinals from 1975 to 1978 and served as offensive coordinator for the Cardinals from 1989 to 1994 under coach Howard Schnellenberger, helping the Cardinals upset No. 25 Alabama in the 1991 Fiesta Bowl by a score of 34–7. Nord followed Schnellenberger to Oklahoma, where he served as offensive coordinator for the 1995 season. After spending the 1996 season as the wide receivers coach at Pittsburgh under Johnny Majors, Nord joined Charlie Bailey's UTEP staff as offensive coordinator in 1997.

The Nord era got off to a surprisingly strong start. Despite low preseason expectations, the Miners went 8–4 in 2000. UTEP began the season in Norman, Oklahoma against No. 19 Oklahoma, losing to the Sooners by a score of 55–14. Nord's squad posted its first win of the season the following week, defeating SMU by a score of 37–20. After losing to Texas A&M in the season's third game, UTEP won their next seven; defeating Hawaii, New Mexico State, Tulsa, San Jose State, Fresno State, Nevada and Rice. The Miners' longest winning streak since 1988 was snapped on November 18 with a 47–14 shellacking to TCU. UTEP made its first appearance in a bowl game since 1988 on December 28, losing to Boise State by a score of 38–23 in the 2000 Humanitarian Bowl.

UTEP regressed to 2–9 in 2001. They kicked off the season with a 26–6 loss to New Mexico. Nord's team handled I-AA opponent Texas Southern by a score of 52–6 in the second game of the season. After losing to Boise State in a rematch of the previous season's bowl game, Texas El-Paso defeated Tulsa by a score of 26–10 for what would be the Miners' last win of the season. The Miners then traveled to Birmingham, Alabama for a showdown against Alabama, a game they lost by a score of 56–7. That was followed by another blowout loss, a 66–7 debacle at the hands of Hawaii on October 13. Next came losses to San Jose State and SMU. On November 10, the Miners lost to Louisiana Tech by a score of 53–30. They closed the season with losses to Rice and Nevada.

Nord's Miners finished 2–10 in 2002. They defeated I-AA foe Sacramento State by a score of 42–12 in the opening game of the season. In the season's second game, the Miners lost to Kentucky by a score of 77–17. That was followed by a 68–0 shutout at the hands of No. 2 Oklahoma. UTEP then lost to Hawaii by a score of 31–6. San Jose State defeated UTEP by a score of 58–24 on September 28. After losing to archrival New Mexico State by a score of 49–14, UTEP broke through with a 38–35 win over Rice. Tulsa shut out Texas El-Paso by a score of 20–0 on October 26 and Boise State won big by a score of 58–3 the next week. The last three losses of the season were a bit closer; 23–17 to Nevada, 42–35 to SMU and 38–24 to Louisiana Tech.

In 2003, UTEP had another two-win season, a 2–11 mark. This included a loss to I-AA opponent Cal Poly by a score of 34–13. After the 2003 season, athletics director Bob Stull fired Nord as head coach. Nord compiled a 14–34 record in his four seasons as head coach.

=== Mike Price era (2004–2012) ===
On December 21, 2003, UTEP announced the hiring of former Washington State head coach Mike Price as its new head football coach. The move was bold and controversial; after Price had left WSU, where he had led the Cougars to unprecedented football success in his 14 years as head coach, he was fired as Alabama's head coach before coaching a single game. He had confessed to visiting a strip club while on vacation in Pensacola, Florida for a golf tournament, being intoxicated for much of the evening, and having about $1,000 charged to his hotel room by an unknown woman staying in the room. This development came on the heels of an earlier reprimand for visiting campus-area bars and drinking into the early hours in Tuscaloosa, Alabama. Price came to UTEP with a reputation as a great quarterbacks coach, having coached Drew Bledsoe and Ryan Leaf at Washington State. At his UTEP introductory press conference, Price said, "I feel reborn. I think this is the right situation for me. My dad told me a long time ago if you go somewhere where you're wanted and needed, your chances for success are a lot better. I want to be here. It's a match made in heaven." Price's starting salary at UTEP in 2004 was $225,000 plus incentives.

On May 1, 2004, it was announced the university would leave the Western Athletic Conference to join Conference USA in all sports beginning on July 1, 2005.

In his first season in 2004, Price led the Miners to a 8–4 record. After losing to No. 23 Boise State by a score of 47–31 early in the season, the Miners embarked upon a seven-game winning streak, their second such streak in the last five years. Tulsa snapped UTEP's winning streak with a 37–35 win over the Miners in the regular season finale on November 27. The Miners were offered and accepted a berth in the 2004 Houston Bowl, where the Miners lost to Colorado by a score of 33–28. The season was an astounding turnaround for the Miners, who had won only two games in each of their previous three seasons. At one time during the 2004 season, UTEP earned its first-ever ranking in the AP Poll, rising as high as 23rd. Price was a finalist for two national coaching honors, the Eddie Robinson Award and the Paul "Bear" Bryant Award for Coach of the Year at the conclusion of the 2004 season.

UTEP again finished 8–4 in 2005, their first season in Conference USA. The Miners began the season with a 34–17 win over New Mexico State, who were in their first game under head coach Hal Mumme, the former UTEP offensive coordinator from 1982 to 1985. A five game win streak resulted in UTEP being ranked No. 24 nationally, before losing to UAB by a score of 35–23 on November 19. UTEP lost to Toledo by a score of 45–13 in the 2005 GMAC Bowl on December 21. Quarterback Jordan Palmer threw for a career-high 29 touchdowns with 19 interceptions while completing 59.4% of his passes for 3,503 yards during the 2005 season. On November 17, 2005, UTEP extended Price's contract by one year.

In 2006, UTEP went 5–7. Jordan Palmer finished his senior season with 26 touchdown passes, 14 interceptions and he completed 65.7% of his passes. During his time at UTEP, Palmer set school records in completions (851), attempts (1,427), passing yards (11,084), touchdown passes (88) and 300-yard passing games (16). He was selected in the sixth round with the 205th overall pick in the 2007 NFL draft by the Washington Redskins.

The team compiled a 4–8 record in 2007. Redshirt freshman Trevor Vittatoe took over the starting quarterback position from recent graduate Jordan Palmer. UTEP began the season by defeating New Mexico, but stumbled over the course of the second half of the season, including a loss to Rice by a score of 56–48 after blowing a 48–28 lead.

The Miners would continute to struggle throughout the end of the decade. A 5–7 record in 2008 and a 4–8 in 2009 which saw them lose to Buffalo in the season opener two years in a row. On October 3, Price's Miners upset No. 12 Houston by a score of 58–41 behind running back Donald Buckram's 262 rushing yards. UTEP finished the season with a 52–21 victory over Marshall behind Trevor Vittatoe's 517 passing yards and five touchdowns. Running back Donald Buckram led Conference USA in rushing during the 2009 season, with 1,594 yards and 18 touchdowns.

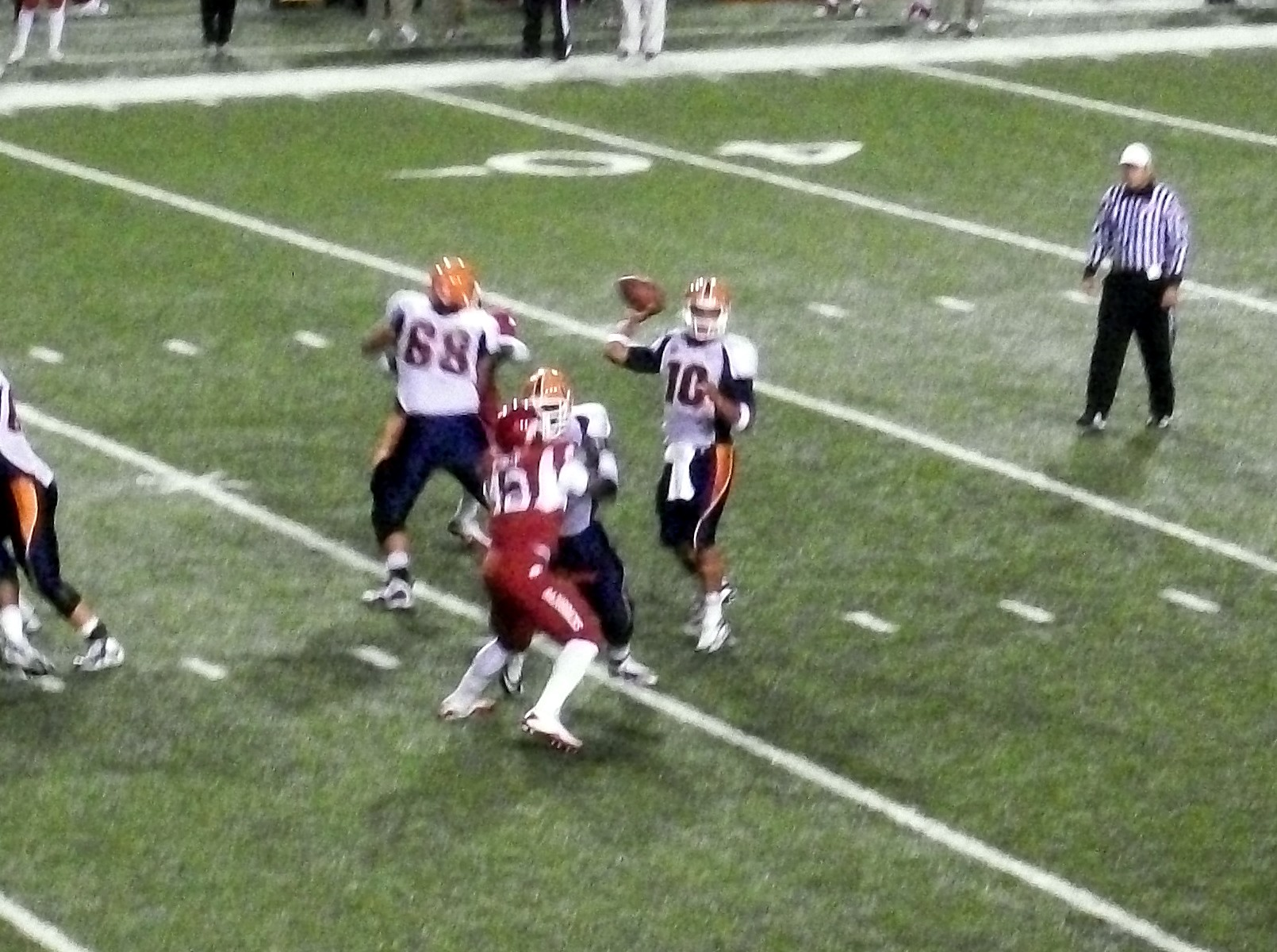
UTEP quarterback Trevor Vittatoe attempts a pass against the Arkansas Razorbacks in 2010, game played in Razorback Stadium, Fayetteville, Arkansas, USA

In 2010, the Miners finished 6–6 in the regular season, being invited to the 2010 New Mexico Bowl. They would lose to the BYU by a score of 52–24. With the New Mexico Bowl appearance, Price became the second Miner head coach to take UTEP to three bowl games, after Mike Brumbelow, who led the Miners to the Sun Bowl in 1954, 1955 and 1957. Trevor Vittatoe, a senior in 2010, broke Jordan Palmer's school records for career passing yards (12,439) and touchdown passes (97) during his time at UTEP. Vittatoe also set school records in total offense (12,291 yards) and touchdowns responsible for (98). Running back Donald Buckram also graduated after the 2010 season and left as the UTEP leader for rushing yards in a single season.

The Miners would not make the postseason for the rest of Price's tenure. They compiled a 5–7 record in 2011. In 2012, UTEP finished 3–9. On November 19, 2012, Price announced that he would be retiring, effective at the end of the season. Price left UTEP with a 48–61 record in nine years, making him the second winningest head coach in UTEP football history behind only Mack Saxon. He would later return to be the interim head coach in 2017.

=== Sean Kugler era (2013–2017) ===
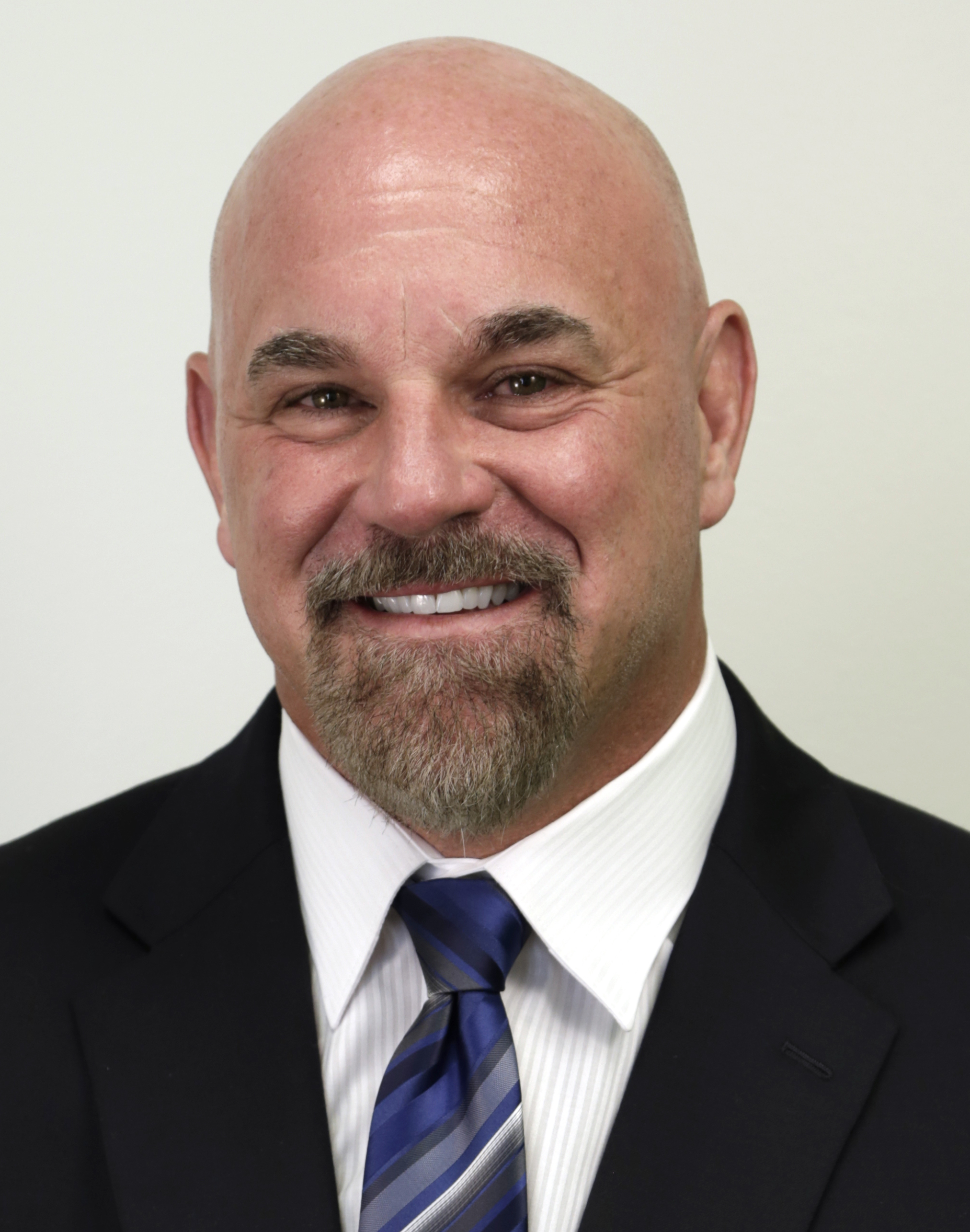
Sean Kugler

Despite having no experience either as a head coach or as a coordinator, Pittsburgh Steelers offensive line coach Sean Kugler was hired to replace Price in December 2012. Kugler played offensive lineman for the Miners from 1984 to 1988 and was on the Miners' ten-win team his senior season under Bob Stull. He served as an assistant coach for UTEP from 1993 to 2000 under David Lee, Charlie Bailey and Gary Nord before serving assistant coach stints for the NFL's Detroit Lions, Boise State under Chris Petersen and the NFL's Buffalo Bills before joining the NFL's Steelers staff under Mike Tomlin.

In Kugler's first season, the Miners compiled a record of 2–10, including a seven game skid that ended with a win over FIU. The Kugler era began with a 42–35 overtime loss to rival New Mexico. The Miners improved the next year to a 7–6 record. The Miners received a berth in the 2014 New Mexico Bowl, their first bowl appearance since 2010. They lost the contest to Utah State by a score of 21–6.

Kugler's Miners would slump to a 9–15 record over the next two years. One of these wins during the 2016 season saw the Miners snap its five-game losing streak with a 52–49 five-overtime game win against conference foe UTSA.

The Miners stumbled to a winless 0–12 record in 2017, their first winless season since 1973. On October 1, 2017, one day after the loss to Army, it was announced that Kugler had resigned as the head coach, effective immediately. Outgoing athletics director Bob Stull turned to Mike Price to serve as the team's interim head coach for the remainder of the season. After a 14–15 loss to Western Kentucky, the team would close out the season never losing a game within one score.

=== Dana Dimel era (2018–2023) ===
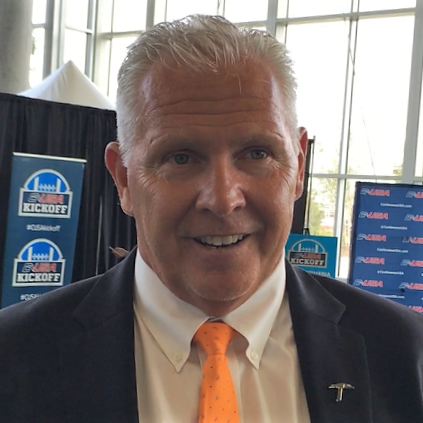
Dana Dimel

On December 6, 2017, Kansas State offensive coordinator Dana Dimel was named UTEP's 26th head football coach. A longtime assistant coach at Kansas State under head coach Bill Snyder, Dimel had previous experience turning around struggling college football programs as head coach, greatly improving both Wyoming from 1997 to 1999 and Houston from 2000 to 2002. UTEP signed Dimel to a five-year contract worth a base salary of $750,000 annually.

The Miners finished with a 1–11 record in 2018. They began the season on September 1 with a 30–10 loss to FCS opponent Northern Arizona. After a 52–24 loss to UNLV in the season's second game, Dimel's team suffered a 24–0 shutout loss to Tennessee. After a 27–20 loss to rival New Mexico State, the Miners lost 30–21 to UTSA, 27–24 to North Texas, 31–24 to Louisiana Tech and 19–0 to UAB before finally snapping their 20-game losing streak by defeating Rice by a score of 34–26. Dimel's Miners finished the season with losses of 48–32 to Middle Tennessee, 40–16 to Western Kentucky and 39–7 to Southern Miss.

The next two years saw the Miners finish with a record of 2–22 over the next two years. 2020 was a season affected by the COVID-19 pandemic, which shortened the Miners season to only eight games. Despite going winless in conference for the second straight year, the team slightly improved in terms of wins to finish with a 3–5 record.

The Miners improved to a 7–6 record in 2021, their first winning season since 2014. The Miners accepted a berth in the 2021 New Mexico Bowl, a game they lost to Fresno State by a score of 31–24. On May 5, 2022, the university administration and Dama Dimel agreed on a two-year contract extension and pay increase of $100,000 for 2022 and then a $25,000 annual increase annually through 2024.

UTEP went 5–7 in 2022. The Miners regressed to a 3–9 record in 2023. Dana Dimel was fired as head coach on November 26, 2023. While Dimel was able to improve UTEP's on-field performance throughout his tenure as head coach, he was unable to achieve sustained success. He left with a 20–49 record and only one winning season. For his buyout, the university paid Dimel $667,292.

=== Scotty Walden era (2024–present) ===
On December 4, 2023, Austin Peay head coach Scotty Walden was named the new head coach of the UTEP Miners. At age 34, Walden was regarded as a young, dynamic coach who had led Austin Peay to their first-ever undefeated record in conference play in the 2023 season. Walden was a native Texan with coaching experience at Sul Ross as an assistant coach, at East Texas first as an assistant coach then as head coach for one season and at Southern Miss first as an assistant coach then as interim head coach during the 2020 season before taking over at Austin Peay. When he was hired, Walden signed a five-year contract worth $800,000 annually.

The Miners finished with a 3–9 record in 2024, with a 42–35 rivalry win over New Mexico State in the final game of the season. They would regress to a 2–10 record in 2025.
