= Sun Bowl =

Annual American college football postseason game

- Old El Paso Sun Bowl
- Stadium: Sun Bowl
- Location: El Paso, Texas, U.S.
- Previous stadiums: Kidd Field (1938–1962); Jones Stadium (1935–1937)
- Operated: 1935–present
- Championship affiliation: Bowl Coalition (1992–1994)
- Conference tie-ins: Pac-12, ACC
- Previous conference tie-ins: Border (1936–1961); Big Ten (1995–2005); Big 12 (2006–2009); Big East (2006–2009)
- Payout: US$4.55 million (2019)
- Website: sunbowl.org

Sponsors
- John Hancock (1986–1993); Norwest Corporation (1996–1998); Wells Fargo (1999–2003); Helen of Troy Limited (2004–2009; through its Vitalis and Brut brands); Hyundai (2010–2018); Kellogg's (2019–2022); WK Kellogg Co (2023–2025; since 2025 a subsidiary of Ferrero SpA); General Mills (2026–present; through its Old El Paso brand)

Former names
- Sun Bowl (1936–1985); John Hancock Sun Bowl (1986–1988); John Hancock Bowl (1989–1993); Sun Bowl (1994–1995); Norwest Bank Sun Bowl (1996); Norwest Sun Bowl (1997–1998); Wells Fargo Sun Bowl (1999–2003); Vitalis Sun Bowl (2004–2005); Brut Sun Bowl (2006–2009); Hyundai Sun Bowl (2010–2018); Tony the Tiger Sun Bowl (2019–2025)

2025 matchup
- Arizona State vs. Duke (Duke 42–39)

The Sun Bowl is a college football bowl game that has been played since 1935 in the southwestern United States at El Paso, Texas. Along with the Sugar Bowl and Orange Bowl, it is the second-oldest bowl game in the country, behind the Rose Bowl. Usually held near the end of December, games are played at the Sun Bowl stadium on the campus of the University of Texas at El Paso. Since 2011, it has featured teams from the Atlantic Coast Conference (ACC) and the Pac-12 Conference. This arrangement continued through the 2025 season, with either Pac-12 schools or Pac-12 "legacy schools" (the 10 schools that left the conference in 2024 for the Big Ten, Big 12, and ACC) fulfilling previous Pac-12 bowl obligations for two seasons.

Since 2026, the game has been sponsored by General Mills' Old El Paso brand and officially known as the Old El Paso Sun Bowl; previous sponsors have included John Hancock Financial, Norwest Corporation, Wells Fargo, Helen of Troy Limited (using its Vitalis and Brut brands), the Hyundai Motor Company, and Frosted Flakes (via its mascot Tony the Tiger).

== History ==
Location in the United States

The first Sun Bowl was the 1935 edition, played on New Year's Day between Texas high school teams; the 1936 edition, played one year later, was the first Sun Bowl contested between college teams. In most of its early history, the game pitted the champion of the Border Conference against an at-large opponent. The first three editions were played at El Paso High School stadium (1935–1937), then switched to Kidd Field until the present stadium was ready in 1963. Through the 1957 season, the game was played on January 1 or January 2; since then, with the exception of the 1976 season, the game has been played in late December, with a majority of games played on or near New Year's Eve and on several occasions played on or about Christmas Day or Christmas Eve.

=== Notable games ===
The 1940 game set the record for fewest points scored, when the Arizona State Teachers College at Tempe Bulldogs played the Catholic University Cardinals to a scoreless tie, the only 0–0 result in Sun Bowl history.

In advance of the 1949 game, Lafayette College turned down an invitation from the Sun Bowl Committee because the committee would not allow an African American player to participate. This bid rejection led to a large student demonstration on the Lafayette campus and in the city of Easton, Pennsylvania, against segregation.

Due to a freak snowstorm before the 1974 game, followed by warming temperatures as the sun created a rising steam from the field during the first half, the game was nicknamed the "Fog Bowl."

The 1992 game was the final head coaching appearance of 2001 College Football Hall of Fame inductee Grant Teaff of Baylor; his Bears won 20–15 over Arizona.

The 1994 game was voted the greatest Sun Bowl ever played, and included four touchdowns by Priest Holmes, as Texas defeated North Carolina, 35–31.

The 2005 game set the record for most points scored (88), as UCLA defeated Northwestern, 50–38.

The 2011 game is the only Sun Bowl decided in overtime (the NCAA started the use of overtime in Division I bowl games in 1995); Utah defeated Georgia Tech, 30–27.

The 2020 edition of the bowl was canceled due to the COVID-19 pandemic.

On December 26, 2021, the Miami Hurricanes announced they would not be able to play in the 2021 edition due to COVID-19 issues so organizers stated they would try to secure a replacement team to face the Washington State Cougars. The following day, the Central Michigan Chippewas were named as the Sun Bowl replacement team. The Chippewas had originally been scheduled to face the Boise State Broncos in the Arizona Bowl, until Boise State withdrew from that bowl due to COVID-19 issues.

== Sponsorship ==
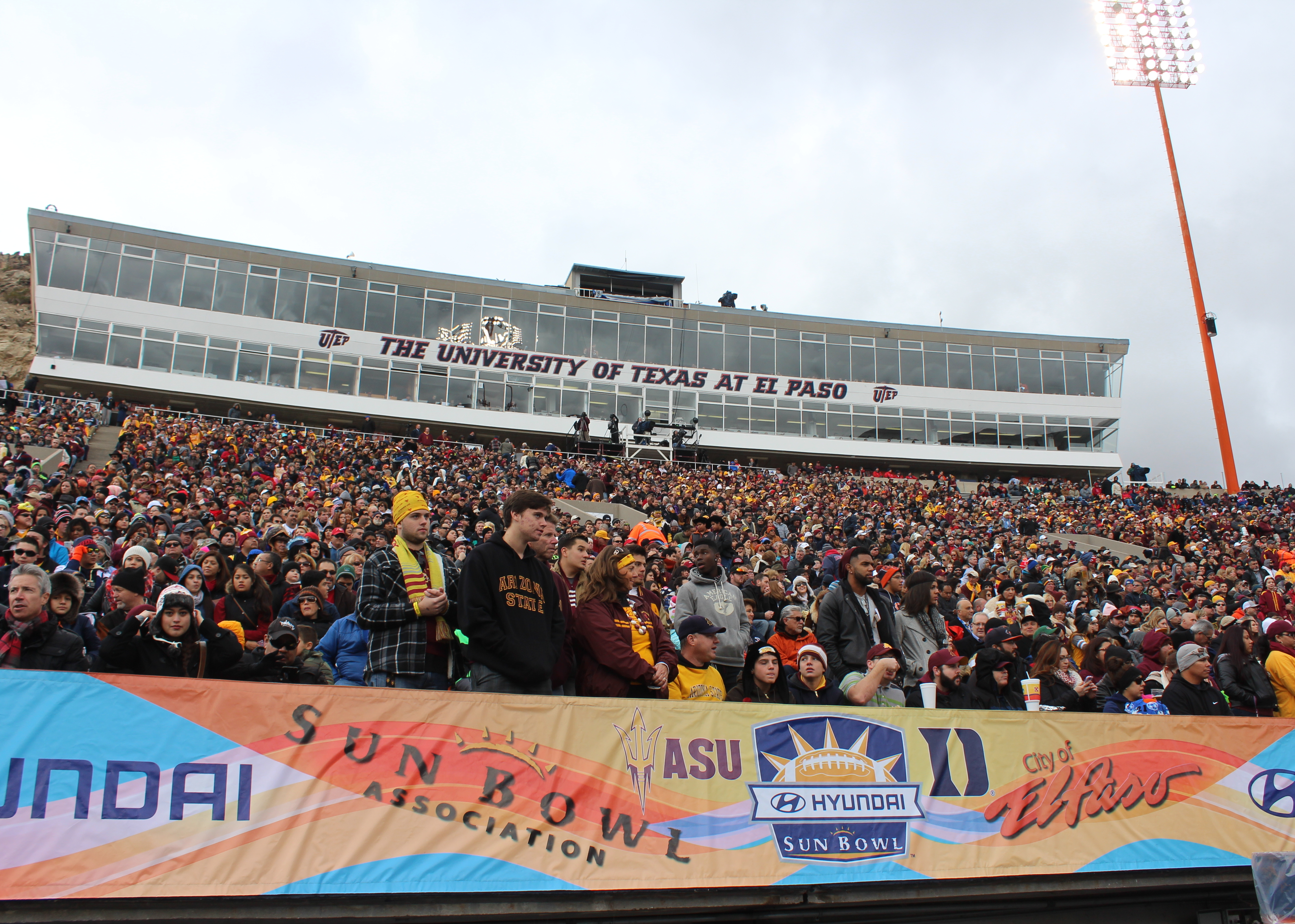
Hyundai signage in the foreground in 2014

The bowl's first title sponsor was John Hancock Financial, who entered a three-year, $1.5 million partnership in June 1986. This came at a time that corporate sponsorship was not common for bowl games, and followed the Fiesta Bowl entering a sponsorship agreement that had made its January 1986 edition the Sunkist Fiesta Bowl. In March 1989, with Sun Bowl organizers and John Hancock Financial negotiating a renewal of the sponsorship agreement, it was reported that an extension might involve renaming the bowl. That came to pass in June 1989, with the annual game changing its name to John Hancock Bowl. Cited as the reason for the change was that, under the prior agreement, the sponsor's name "wasn't mentioned enough in national media to justify the expense." Even after the formal name change, some newspapers continued to refer to it as the Sun Bowl. Five editions of the game were staged as the John Hancock Bowl, from 1989 through 1993. After the 1993 playing, John Hancock Financial reduced its support of the bowl game, to dedicate more of its promotional budget to the 1996 Summer Olympics. The name reverted to Sun Bowl, and to ensure the game would continue, the El Paso city council allocated $600,000 to cover expenses in case of a shortfall.

Subsequent title sponsorship came from Norwest Corporation (1996–1998), which then merged into Wells Fargo (1999–2003), El Paso–based Helen of Troy Limited—using its brand names of Vitalis (2004–2005) and Brut (2006–2009)—and Hyundai Motor Company (2010–2018).

In August 2019, it was announced that Kellogg's had been named the new title sponsor of the Sun Bowl; the game was sponsored via its Frosted Flakes brand as the Tony the Tiger Sun Bowl. In July 2024, the WK Kellogg Co. (a 2023 spin-off of the Kellogg's cereal business) renewed its sponsorship for "at least two more years".

On September 15, 2026, the Sun Bowl Association announced that the WK Kellogg Co. would not renew its sponsorship agreement. Two days later, General Mills announced that it would become the new title sponsor via its Old El Paso brand, rebranding the game as the Old El Paso Sun Bowl.

== Conference tie-ins ==
Until the demise of the Border Conference in 1962, the Sun Bowl usually featured the champion of that conference, which was considered the "host" team, against an at-large team.

The bowl was later aligned with the Big Ten Conference, then established a longtime partnership with the Pacific-10 Conference, commonly known as the Pac-10 and later renamed the Pac-12. In 2010, the bowl entered a four-year contract with the Atlantic Coast Conference (ACC) along with the Pac-10. A later six-year contract with the ACC and Pac-12 ran through the 2025 edition—under that contract:

- For the ACC, the Sun Bowl was placed in the second group of bowls behind the College Football Playoff (CFP). The first group was the Holiday Bowl, Pop-Tarts Bowl, and Gator Bowl. The Sun Bowl was grouped with the Pinstripe Bowl and Duke's Mayo Bowl in the second group.
- For the Pac-12 (including its legacy members after 2023), the Sun Bowl was grouped with five other bowls (Alamo Bowl, Holiday Bowl, Las Vegas Bowl, LA Bowl, and Independence Bowl) behind the CFP.

== Game results ==
Three editions of the bowl ended in a tie—1936, 1940, and 1985—they are denoted by italics in the below table; overtime has been used in bowl games since the 1995–96 bowl season. The inaugural game in 1935 was contested between high school teams. For sponsorship reasons, the 1989 through 1993 editions were known as the John Hancock Bowl.

Rankings are based on the AP poll, prior to game being played.

No.	Date played	Winning team		Losing team		Attnd.	Notes
1	January 1, 1935	El Paso All-Stars	25	Ranger (Texas)	21	3,000	notes
2	January 1, 1936	Hardin–Simmons	14	New Mexico A&M	14	12,000	notes
3	January 1, 1937	Hardin–Simmons	34	Texas Mines	6	8,000	notes
4	January 1, 1938	West Virginia	7	Texas Tech	6	12,000	notes
5	January 2, 1939	Utah	26	New Mexico	0	13,000	notes
6	January 1, 1940	Arizona State	0	Catholic	0	13,000	notes
7	January 1, 1941	Western Reserve	26	Arizona State	13	14,000	notes
8	January 1, 1942	Tulsa	6	Texas Tech	0	14,000	notes
9	January 1, 1943	Second Air Force	13	Hardin–Simmons	7	18,000	notes
10	January 1, 1944	Southwestern	7	New Mexico	0	18,000	notes
11	January 1, 1945	Southwestern	35	UNAM	0	13,000	notes
12	January 1, 1946	New Mexico	34	Denver	24	15,000	notes
13	January 1, 1947	Cincinnati	18	Virginia Tech	6	10,000	notes
14	January 1, 1948	Miami (Ohio)	13	Texas Tech	12	18,000	notes
15	January 1, 1949	West Virginia	21	Texas Mines	12	13,000	notes
16	January 2, 1950	Texas Western	33	Georgetown	20	15,000	notes
17	January 1, 1951	West Texas State	14	Cincinnati	13	16,000	notes
18	January 1, 1952	Texas Tech	25	Pacific	14	17,000	notes
19	January 1, 1953	Pacific	26	Mississippi Southern	7	11,000	notes
20	January 1, 1954	Texas Western	37	Mississippi Southern	14	9,500	notes
21	January 1, 1955	Texas Western	47	Florida State	20	14,000	notes
22	January 2, 1956	Wyoming	21	Texas Tech	14	14,500	notes
23	January 1, 1957	No. 17 George Washington	13	Texas Western	0	13,500	notes
24	January 1, 1958	Louisville	34	Drake	20	13,000	notes
25	December 31, 1958	Wyoming	14	Hardin–Simmons	6	12,000–13,000	notes
26	December 31, 1959	New Mexico A&M	28	North Texas State	8	14,000	notes
27	December 31, 1960	No. 17 New Mexico State	20	Utah State	13	16,000–16,200	notes
28	December 30, 1961	Villanova	17	Wichita	9	15,000	notes
29	December 31, 1962	West Texas State	15	Ohio	14	13,000–16,000	notes
30	December 31, 1963	Oregon	21	SMU	14	18,646	notes
31	December 26, 1964	Georgia	7	Texas Tech	0	23,292	notes
32	December 31, 1965	Texas Western	13	TCU	12	24,598	notes
33	December 24, 1966	Wyoming	28	Florida State	20	17,965	notes
34	December 30, 1967	UTEP	14	Ole Miss	7	28,630	notes
35	December 28, 1968	Auburn	34	Arizona	10	27,062	notes
36	December 20, 1969	No. 14 Nebraska	45	Georgia	6	26,668	notes
37	December 19, 1970	No. 13 Georgia Tech	17	No. 19 Texas Tech	9	26,188	notes
38	December 18, 1971	No. 10 LSU	33	No. 17 Iowa State	15	29,377	notes
39	December 30, 1972	No. 16 North Carolina	32	Texas Tech	28	27,877	notes
40	December 29, 1973	Missouri	34	Auburn	17	26,108	notes
41	December 28, 1974	Mississippi State	26	North Carolina	24	26,035	notes
42	December 26, 1975	No. 20 Pittsburgh	33	No. 19 Kansas	19	30,272	notes
43	January 2, 1977	No. 10 Texas A&M	37	Florida	14	31,896	notes
44	December 31, 1977	Stanford	24	LSU	14	30,621	notes
45	December 23, 1978	No. 14 Texas	42	No. 13 Maryland	0	30,604	notes
46	December 22, 1979	No. 13 Washington	14	No. 11 Texas	7	30,124	notes
47	December 27, 1980	No. 8 Nebraska	31	No. 17 Mississippi State	17	31,332	notes
48	December 26, 1981	Oklahoma	40	Houston	14	29,985	notes
49	December 25, 1982	North Carolina	26	No. 8 Texas	10	29,055	notes
50	December 24, 1983	Alabama	28	No. 6 SMU	7	41,412	notes
51	December 22, 1984	No. 12 Maryland	28	Tennessee	27	50,126	notes
52	December 28, 1985	Arizona	13	Georgia	13	50,203	notes
53	December 25, 1986	No. 13 Alabama	28	No. 12 Washington	6	48,722	notes
54	December 25, 1987	No. 11 Oklahoma State	35	West Virginia	33	43,240	notes
55	December 24, 1988	No. 20 Alabama	29	Army	28	43,661	notes
56	December 30, 1989	No. 24 Pittsburgh	31	No. 16 Texas A&M	28	44,887	notes
57	December 31, 1990	No. 22 Michigan State	17	No. 21 USC	16	50,562	notes
58	December 31, 1991	No. 22 UCLA	6	Illinois	3	42,281	notes
59	December 31, 1992	Baylor	20	No. 22 Arizona	15	41,622	notes
60	December 24, 1993	No. 19 Oklahoma	41	Texas Tech	10	43,684	notes
61	December 30, 1994	Texas	35	No. 19 North Carolina	31	50,612	notes
62	December 29, 1995	Iowa	38	No. 20 Washington	18	49,116	notes
63	December 31, 1996	Stanford	38	Michigan State	0	42,721	notes
64	December 31, 1997	No. 16 Arizona State	17	Iowa	7	49,104	notes
65	December 31, 1998	TCU	28	USC	19	46,612	notes
66	December 31, 1999	Oregon	24	No. 12 Minnesota	20	48,757	notes
67	December 29, 2000	Wisconsin	21	UCLA	20	49,093	notes
68	December 31, 2001	No. 13 Washington State	33	Purdue	27	47,812	notes
69	December 31, 2002	Purdue	34	Washington	24	48,917	notes
70	December 31, 2003	No. 24 Minnesota	31	Oregon	30	49,864	notes
71	December 31, 2004	No. 21 Arizona State	27	Purdue	23	51,288	notes
72	December 30, 2005	No. 17 UCLA	50	Northwestern	38	50,426	notes
73	December 29, 2006	No. 24 Oregon State	39	Missouri	38	48,732	notes
74	December 31, 2007	Oregon	56	No. 23 South Florida	21	49,867	notes
75	December 31, 2008	No. 24 Oregon State	3	No. 18 Pittsburgh	0	49,037	notes
76	December 31, 2009	Oklahoma	31	No. 19 Stanford	27	53,713	notes
77	December 31, 2010	Notre Dame	33	Miami (FL)	17	54,021	notes
78	December 31, 2011	Utah	30	Georgia Tech	27 (OT)	48,123	notes
79	December 31, 2012	Georgia Tech	21	USC	7	47,922	notes
80	December 31, 2013	No. 17 UCLA	42	Virginia Tech	12	47,912	notes
81	December 27, 2014	No. 15 Arizona State	36	Duke	31	47,809	notes
82	December 26, 2015	Washington State	20	Miami (FL)	14	41,180	notes
83	December 30, 2016	No. 16 Stanford	25	North Carolina	23	42,166	notes
84	December 29, 2017	NC State	52	Arizona State	31	39,897	notes
85	December 31, 2018	Stanford	14	Pittsburgh	13	40,680	notes
86	December 31, 2019	Arizona State	20	Florida State	14	42,212	notes
87	December 31, 2020	Canceled due to the COVID-19 pandemic				—	
88	December 31, 2021	Central Michigan	24	Washington State	21	34,540	notes
89	December 30, 2022	Pittsburgh	37	No. 18 UCLA	35	41,104	notes
90	December 29, 2023	No. 15 Notre Dame	40	No. 21 Oregon State	8	48,223	notes
91	December 31, 2024	Louisville	35	Washington	34	40,826	notes
92	December 31, 2025	Duke	42	Arizona State	39	44,975	notes

Note: the bowl's game programs indicate that organizers consider the unplayed 2020 game to have been the 87th edition, as the 2021 game is referred to as the 88th edition, the 2022 game as the 89th edition, etc.

== Awards ==
=== C. M. Hendricks Most Valuable Player Trophy ===
Awarded since 1950; named after the first Sun Bowl Association president, Dr. C. M. Hendricks.
Two players have been two-time MVPs; Charley Johnson (1959, 1960) and Billy Stevens (1965, 1967).

Game	MVP(s)	Team	Position
1950	Harvey Gabrel	Texas Western	HB
1951	Bill Cross	West Texas State	E
1952	Junior Arteburn	Texas Tech	QB
1953	Tom McCormick	Pacific	HB
1954	Dick Shinaut	Texas Western	QB
1955	Jesse Whittenton	Texas Western	QB
1956	Jim Crawford	Wyoming	HB
1957	Claude Austin	George Washington	RB
1958 (Jan.)	Ken Porco	Louisville	RB
1958 (Dec.)	Leonard Kucewski	Wyoming	G
1959	Charley Johnson	New Mexico A&M	QB
1960	Charley Johnson	New Mexico State	QB
1961	Billy Joe	Villanova	FB
1962	Jerry Logan	West Texas State	HB
1963	Bob Berry	Oregon	QB
1964	Preston Ridlehuber	Georgia	QB
1965	Billy Stevens	Texas Western	QB
1966	Jim Kiick	Wyoming	TB
1967	Billy Stevens	UTEP	QB
1968	Buddy McClinton	Auburn	DB
1969	Paul Rogers	Nebraska	HB
1970	Rock Perdoni	Georgia Tech	DT
1971	Bert Jones	LSU	QB
1972	George Smith	Texas Tech	HB
1973	Ray Bybee	Missouri	FB
1974	Terry Vitrano	Mississippi State	FB
1975	Robert Haygood	Pittsburgh	QB
1977 (Jan.)	Tony Franklin	Texas A&M	K
1977 (Dec.)	Charles Alexander	LSU	TB
1978	Johnny "Lam" Jones	Texas	RB
1979	Paul Skansi	Washington	WR
1980	Jeff Quinn	Nebraska	QB
1981	Darrell Shepard	Oklahoma	QB
1982	Rob Rogers	North Carolina	TB
1982	Ethan Horton	North Carolina	TB
1982	Brooks Barwick	North Carolina	TB
1983	Walter Lewis	Alabama	QB
1984	Rick Badanjek	Maryland	FB
1985	Max Zendejas	Arizona	K
1986	Cornelius Bennett	Alabama	DE

Game	MVP(s)	Team	Position
1987	Thurman Thomas	Oklahoma State	RB
1988	David Smith	Alabama	QB
1989	Alex Van Pelt	Pittsburgh	QB
1990	Courtney Hawkins	Michigan State	WR
1991	Arnold Ale	UCLA	LB
1992	Melvin Bonner	Baylor	WR
1993	Cale Gundy	Oklahoma	RB
1994	Priest Holmes	Texas	RB
1995	Sedrick Shaw	Iowa	RB
1996	Chad Hutchinson	Stanford	QB
1997	Mike Martin	Arizona State	RB
1998	Basil Mitchell	TCU	TB
1999	Billy Cockerham	Minnesota	QB
2000	Freddie Mitchell	UCLA	WR
2001	Lamont Thompson	Washington State	S
2002	Kyle Orton	Purdue	QB
2003	Samie Parker	Oregon	WR
2004	Sam Keller	Arizona State	QB
2005	Kahlil Bell	UCLA	RB
2005	Chris Markey	UCLA	RB
2006	Matt Moore	Oregon State	QB
2007	Jonathan Stewart	Oregon	RB
2008	Victor Butler	Oregon State	DE
2009	Ryan Broyles	Oklahoma	WR
2010	Michael Floyd	Notre Dame	WR
2011	John White IV	Utah	RB
2012	Rod Sweeting	Georgia Tech	CB
2013	Brett Hundley	UCLA	QB
2013	Jordan Zumwalt	UCLA	LB
2014	Demario Richard	Arizona State	RB
2015	Luke Falk	Washington State	QB
2016	Solomon Thomas	Stanford	DE
2017	Nyheim Hines	NC State	RB
2018	Cameron Scarlett	Stanford	RB
2019	Jayden Daniels	Arizona State	QB
2021	Lew Nichols III	Central Michigan	RB
2022	Rodney Hammond Jr.	Pittsburgh	RB
2023	Jordan Faison	Notre Dame	WR
2024	Harrison Bailey	Louisville	QB
2025			

=== Jimmy Rogers Jr. Most Valuable Lineman Trophy ===
Awarded since 1961; named after former Sun Bowl president Jimmy Rogers Jr.

Game	Player	Team	Position
1961	Rich Ross	Villanova	G
1962	Don Hoovler	Ohio	G
1963	Dun Hughes	SMU	G
1964	Jim Wilson	Georgia	T
1965	Ronny Nixon	TCU	T
1966	Jerry Durling	Wyoming	MG
1967	Fred Carr	UTEP	LB
1968	David Campbell	Auburn	T
1969	Jerry Murtaugh	Nebraska	LB
1970	Bill Flowers	Georgia Tech	LB
1971	Matt Blair	Iowa State	LB
1972	Ecomet Burley	Texas Tech	DT
1973	John Kelsey	Missouri	TE
1974	Jimmy Webb	Mississippi State	DT
1975	Al Romano	Pittsburgh	MG
1977 (Jan.)	Edgar Fields	Texas A&M	DT
1977 (Dec.)	Gordon Ceresino	Stanford	LB
1978	Dwight Jefferson	Texas	DT
1979	Doug Martin	Washington	DT
1980	Jimmy Williams	Nebraska	DE
1981	Rick Bryan	Oklahoma	DT
1982	Ronnie Mullins	Texas	DB
1983	Wes Neighbors	Alabama	C
1984	Carl Zander	Tennessee	LB
1985	Peter Anderson	Georgia	C
1986	Steve Alvord	Washington	MG
1987	Darren Warren	West Virginia	LB
1988	Derrick Thomas	Alabama	LB
1989	Anthony Williams	Texas A&M	LB
1990	Craig Hartsuyker	USC	LB
1991	Mike Ploskey	Illinois	DT
1992	Rob Waldrop	Arizona	NT
1993	Shawn Jackson	Texas Tech	DE
1994	Blake Brockermeyer	Texas	OT
1995	Jared DeVries	Iowa	DL
1996	Kailee Wong	Stanford	DE
1997	Jeremy Staat	Arizona State	DT
1998	London Dunlap	TCU	DE
1999	Dyron Russ	Minnesota	DT
2000	Oscar Cabrera	UCLA	OG
2001	Akin Ayodele	Purdue	DE
2002	Shaun Phillips	Purdue	DE
2003	Junior Siavaii	Oregon	DT
2004	Brandon Villareal	Purdue	DT
2005	Kevin Mims	Northwestern	DT
2006	Xzavie Jackson	Missouri	DE
2007	Fenuki Tupou	Oregon	OT
2008	Greg Romeus	Pittsburgh	DE
2009	Gerald McCoy	Oklahoma	DE
2010	Zach Martin	Notre Dame	OT
2011	Star Lotulelei	Utah	DT
2012	Jay Finch	Georgia Tech	C
2013	Kenny Clark	UCLA	DT
2014	Marcus Hardison	Arizona State	DE
2015	Hercules Mata'afa	Washington State	DE
2016	Nazair Jones	North Carolina	DT
2017	Kentavius Street	NC State	DE
2018	Thomas Booker	Stanford	DE
2019	Robert Cooper	Florida State	DT
2021	Ron Stone Jr.	Washington State	DE
2022	Jay Toia	UCLA	DL
2023	Jordan Botelho	Notre Dame	DL
2024	Jordan Guerad	Louisville	DL
2025			

=== John Folmer Most Valuable Special Teams Player Trophy ===
Awarded since 1994; named after former Sun Bowl president John Folmer.
Positions: P=Punter, K=Kicker, PR=Punt returner, KR=Kickoff returner

Game	Player	Team	Position	Statistics	Ref.
1994	Marcus Wall	North Carolina	KR/PR	3 returns, long 82	
1995	Brion Hurley	Iowa	K/P	3/3 FG, 0/0 XP	
1996	Troy Walters	Stanford	PR	5 returns, long 24	
1997	Tim Dwight	Iowa	KR/PR	6 returns, long 26	
1998	Adam Abrams	USC	K	2/2 FG, 1/1 XP	
1999	Ryan Rindels	Minnesota	P	7 punts, avg. 46.1	
2000	Michael Bennett	Wisconsin	KR	2 returns, long 54	
2001	Drew Dunning	Washington State	K	4/4 FG, 3/3 XP	
2002	Anthony Chambers	Purdue	KR/PR	3 returns, long 51	
2003	Jared Siegel	Oregon	K	3/3 FG, 3/3 XP	
2004	Dave Brytus	Purdue	P	8 punts, avg. 48.9	
2005	Brandon Breazell	UCLA	KR	2 TD returns	
2006	Jeff Wolfert	Missouri	K	1/1 FG, 5/5 XP	
2007	Matt Evensen	Oregon	K	2/2 FG, 5/5 XP	
2008	Johnny Hekker	Oregon State	P	10 punts, avg. 45.0	
2009	Ryan Broyles	Oklahoma	PR	4 returns, long 42	
2010	David Ruffer	Notre Dame	K	3/4 FG, 3/3 XP	
2011	DeVonte Christopher	Utah	KR	2 returns, long 68	
2012	Jamal Golden	Georgia Tech	KR/PR	3 returns, long 56	
2013	Kaʻimi Fairbairn	UCLA	K	0/1 FG 6/6 XP	
2014	Kalen Ballage	Arizona State	KR	3 returns, long 96	
2015	Erik Powell	Washington State	K	2/2 FG, 2/2 XP	
2016	Conrad Ukropina	Stanford	K	4/5 FG, 1/1 XP	
2017	Kyle Bambard	NC State	K	1/1 FG, 7/7 XP	
2018	Alex Kessman	Pittsburgh	K	2/2 FG, 1/1 XP	
2019	Cristian Zendejas	Arizona State	K	4/4 FG, 0/0 XP	
2021	Marshall Meeder	Central Michigan	K	3/5 FG, 1/1 XP	
2022	Ben Sauls	Pittsburgh	K	5/5 FG, 2/2 XP	
2023	Spencer Shrader	Notre Dame	K	1/2 FG, 5/5 XP	
2024	Carter Schwartz	Louisville	P	6 punts, avg. 43.7	
2025					

== Most appearances ==
Updated through the December 2025 edition (91 games, 182 total appearances), excluding the unplayed 87th edition of December 2020.

Teams with multiple appearances

Rank	Team	Appearances	Record	Win pct.
1	Texas Tech	9	1–8	.111
T2	UTEP	8	5–3	.625
T2	Arizona State	8	4–3–1	.563
T4	Stanford	5	4–1	.800
T4	UCLA	5	3–2	.600
T4	Pittsburgh	5	3–2	.600
T4	North Carolina	5	2–3	.400
T4	Washington	5	1–4	.200
T9	Oregon	4	3–1	.750
T9	Texas	4	2–2	.500
T9	Hardin–Simmons	4	1–2–1	.375
T12	Alabama	3	3–0	1.000
T12	Oklahoma	3	3–0	1.000
T12	Wyoming	3	3–0	1.000
T12	New Mexico State	3	2–0–1	.833
T12	Georgia Tech	3	2–1	.667
T12	Washington State	3	2–1	.667
T12	West Virginia	3	2–1	.667
T12	Oregon State	3	2–1	.667
T12	Georgia	3	1–1–1	.500
T12	New Mexico	3	1–2	.333
T12	Purdue	3	1–2	.333
T12	Arizona	3	0–2–1	.167
T12	Florida State	3	0–3	.000
T12	USC	3	0–3	.000

Rank	Team	Appearances	Record	Win pct.
T26	Nebraska	2	2–0	1.000
T26	Notre Dame	2	2–0	1.000
T26	Southwestern	2	2–0	1.000
T26	Utah	2	2–0	1.000
T26	West Texas State	2	2–0	1.000
T26	Louisville	2	2–0	1.000
T26	Auburn	2	1–1	.500
T26	Cincinnati	2	1–1	.500
T26	High school teams	2	1–1	.500
T26	Iowa	2	1–1	.500
T26	LSU	2	1–1	.500
T26	Maryland	2	1–1	.500
T26	Michigan State	2	1–1	.500
T26	Minnesota	2	1–1	.500
T26	Mississippi State	2	1–1	.500
T26	Missouri	2	1–1	.500
T26	Pacific	2	1–1	.500
T26	TCU	2	1–1	.500
T26	Texas A&M	2	1–1	.500
T26	Duke	2	1–1	.500
T26	Miami (Florida)	2	0–2	.000
T26	Mississippi Southern	2	0–2	.000
T26	SMU	2	0–2	.000
T26	Virginia Tech	2	0–2	.000

Teams with a single appearance

Won (11): Baylor, Central Michigan, George Washington, Miami (Ohio), NC State, Oklahoma State, Second Air Force, Tulsa, Villanova, Western Reserve, Wisconsin
Lost (18): Army, Denver, Drake, Florida, Georgetown, Houston, Illinois, Iowa State, Kansas, North Texas State, Northwestern, Ohio, Ole Miss, South Florida, Tennessee, UNAM, Utah State, Wichita
Tied (1): Catholic

Notes

- UTEP's record includes appearances when it was known as Texas Mines and Texas Western.
- New Mexico State's record includes appearances when it was known as New Mexico A&M.
- California and Colorado are the only legacy Pac-12 members that have not appeared in the Sun Bowl.
- Northern Arizona (now in the FCS) is the only former member of the Border Conference that has not appeared in the Sun Bowl.

== Appearances by conference ==
Updated through the December 2025 edition (91 games, 182 total appearances), excluding the unplayed 87th edition of December 2020.

Conference	Record					Appearances by season		
Conference	Games	W	L	T	Win pct.	Won	Lost	Tied
Pac-12	34	19	14	1	.574	1977, 1979, 1991, 1996, 1997, 1999, 2001, 2004, 2005, 2006, 2007, 2008, 2011, 2013, 2014, 2015, 2016, 2018, 2019	1986, 1990, 1992, 1995, 1998, 2000, 2002, 2003, 2009, 2012, 2017, 2021, 2022, 2023	1985
Independents	31	18	11	2	.613	1936*, 1937*, 1942*, 1946*, 1947*, 1948*, 1952*, 1957*, 1961, 1962, 1963, 1965, 1967, 1970, 1975, 1989, 2010, 2023	1943*, 1944*, 1949*, 1951*, 1952*, 1953*, 1954*, 1957*, 1966, 1987, 1988	1935*, 1939*
Border	21	8	11	2	.429	1945*, 1949*, 1950*, 1951*, 1953*, 1954*, 1959, 1960	1936*, 1937*, 1938*, 1940*, 1941*, 1942*, 1947*, 1948*, 1955*, 1956*, 1958	1935*, 1939*
ACC	19	8	11	0	.421	1972, 1982, 1984, 2012, 2017, 2022, 2024, 2025	1974, 1978, 1994, 2010, 2011, 2013, 2014, 2015, 2016, 2018, 2019	
SEC	15	7	7	1	.500	1964, 1968, 1971, 1974, 1983, 1986, 1988	1967, 1969, 1973, 1976*, 1977, 1980, 1984	1985
SWC	15	4	11	0	.267	1976*, 1978, 1992, 1994	1963, 1964, 1965, 1970, 1972, 1979, 1981, 1982, 1983, 1989, 1993	
Big Ten	13	5	8	0	.385	1990, 1995, 2000, 2002, 2003	1991, 1996, 1997, 1999, 2001, 2004, 2005, 2024	
Big Eight	8	6	2	0	.750	1969, 1973, 1980, 1981, 1987, 1993	1971, 1975	
Mountain States	5	3	2	0	.600	1938*, 1955*, 1958	1945*, 1960	
WAC	3	2	1	0	.667	1966, 1998	1968	
Big 12	3	1	2	0	.333	2009	2006, 2025	
MVC	3	1	2	0	.333	1941*	1959, 1961	
MAC	3	1	2	0	.333	2021	1950*, 1962	
Texas Conference	2	2	0	0	1.000	1943*, 1944*		
SoCon	2	1	1	0	.500	1956*	1946*	
High school teams	2	1	1	0	.500	1934*	1934*	
Big East	2	0	2	0	.000		2007, 2008	
Big Four (Ohio)	1	1	0	0	1.000	1940*		

- Games marked with an asterisk (*) were played in January of the following calendar year.
- The first edition of the game, played in January 1935, was contested between high school teams.
- Records are based on teams' conferences at the time each game was played.
- Conferences that are defunct or not currently active in FBS are marked in italics.
- The American Conference retains the conference charter of the Big East following the 2013 split of the original Big East along football lines. Big East appearances: South Florida (2007) and Pittsburgh (2008).
- The Pac-12's record includes appearances by teams when the conference was the Pac-8 and Pac-10.
- The Mountain States Conferences was popularly known as the Skyline Conference from 1947 through 1962.
- Independent appearances (30): Army (1988), Catholic (1939*), Cincinnati (1946*), Drake (1957*), Florida State (1954*, 1966), Georgetown (1949*), Georgia Tech (1970), Hardin–Simmons (1935*, 1936*), Louisville (1957*), Miami (OH) (1947*), New Mexico (1943*), Notre Dame (2010, 2023), Oregon (1963), Pacific (1951*, 1952*), Pittsburgh (1975, 1989), Second Air Force (1942*), Southern Miss (1952*, 1953*), UNAM (1944*), UTEP (1965, 1967), Villanova (1961), West Texas State (1962), and West Virginia (1937*, 1948*, 1987).

== Game records ==
Team	Record, Team vs. Opponent	Year
Most points scored (one team)	56, Oregon vs. South Florida	2007
Most points scored (both teams)	88, UCLA (50) vs. Northwestern (38)	2005
Most points scored (losing team)	39, Arizona State vs. Duke	2025
Fewest points allowed	0, most recent: Oregon State vs. Pittsburgh	2008
Largest margin of victory	42, Texas (42) vs. Maryland (0)	1978
Total yards	619, Arizona State vs. Duke	2025
Rushing yards	455, Mississippi State vs. North Carolina	1974
Passing yards	419, Purdue vs. Washington State	2001
First downs	33, Northwestern vs. UCLA	2005
Fewest yards allowed	(−21), Southwestern vs. UNAM	1945
Fewest rushing yards allowed	(−23), TCU vs. USC	1998
Fewest passing yards allowed	(−50), Southwestern vs. UNAM	1945
Individual	Record, Player, Team vs. Opponent	Year
All-purpose yards	282, Jonathan Stewart, Oregon vs. South Florida; 253 rush, 29 return	2007
Touchdowns (all-purpose)	4, shared by: Thurman Thomas, Oklahoma State vs. West Virginia; Priest Holmes, Texas vs. North Carolina; Demario Richard, Arizona State vs. Duke	1987; 1994; 2014
Rushing yards	253, Jonathan Stewart, Oregon vs. South Florida	2007
Rushing touchdowns	4, shared by: Thurman Thomas, Oklahoma State vs. West Virginia; Priest Holmes, Texas vs. North Carolina	1987; 1994
Passing yards	419, Kyle Orton, Purdue vs. Washington	2002
Passing touchdowns	4, shared by: Matt Moore, Oregon State vs. Missouri; Justin Roper, Oregon vs. South Florida Demond Williams Jr., Washington vs. Louisville; Darian Mensah Duke vs. Arizona State	2006; 2007 2024; 2025
Receiving yards	200, Samie Parker, Oregon vs. Minnesota	2003
Receiving touchdowns	4, Giles Jackson, Washington vs. Louisville	2024
Tackles	24, Carl Zander, Tennessee vs. Maryland; 14 solo, 10 assist	1984
Sacks	4.5, Reggie McKenzie, Tennessee vs. Maryland	1984
Interceptions	3, shared by: Buddy McClinton, Auburn vs. Arizona; Harrison Smith, Notre Dame vs. Miami (FL)	1968; 2010
Long Plays	Record, Player, Team vs. Opponent	Year
Touchdown run	94, Hascall Henshaw, Arizona State vs. Western Reserve	1941
Touchdown pass	91, James Blackman to Tamorrion Terry, Florida State vs. Arizona State	2019
Kickoff return	100, Peter Panuska, Tennessee vs. Maryland	1984
Punt return	82, Marcus Wall, North Carolina vs. Texas	1994
Interception return	91, Don "Skip" Hoovler, Ohio vs. West Texas	1962
Fumble return		
Punt	78, Scott Blanton, Oklahoma vs. Texas Tech	1993
Field goal	62, Tony Franklin, Texas A&M vs. Florida	1977
Miscellaneous	Record, Teams	Year
Largest attendance	54,021, Notre Dame vs. Miami (FL)	2010

== Media coverage ==
NBC broadcast the Sun Bowl nationally in 1964 and 1966. From 1968 until the present, the game has been broadcast by CBS Sports. The Sun Bowl's contract with CBS Sports is the longest continuous relationship between a bowl game and one television network.
