= George Washington Colonials football =

- First season: 1881
- Last season: 1966; 60 years ago
- Location: Washington, D.C., U.S.
- Conference: Southern Conference
- Colors: Buff and blue
- All-time record: 217–252–37 (.465)
- Bowl record: 1–0 (1.000)

Conference championships
- 0
- Rivalries: Georgetown; Maryland; West Virginia; Virginia Tech; Virginia

The George Washington Colonials football team represented George Washington University of Washington, D.C. in college football competition from 1881 to 1966. The team's home field in the final six seasons was District of Columbia Stadium, shared with the Washington Redskins of the National Football League.

The Colonials were most successful between the 1930s and 1950s, when they regularly played top-level competition. George Washington made one bowl game appearance, at the end of the 1956 season at the Sun Bowl in El Paso, Texas; the Colonials shut out host Texas Western, 13–0, on New Year's Day. The football program was discontinued after the 1966 season due to a number of factors, including the team's lack of an on-campus stadium and football support facilities.

== History ==
The earliest recorded football games at Columbian University (as the school was known until 1904) were five contests against Gallaudet and Episcopal High School between 1881 and 1883. On November 8, 1890, football resumed when Columbian defeated a Washington-based club, Kalorama AC, 10–0. The team played off and on until 1920. That season was not a successful one for George Washington, which finished 1–6–1, including a defeat at the hands of West Virginia, 81–0, and West Virginia Wesleyan, 101–7.

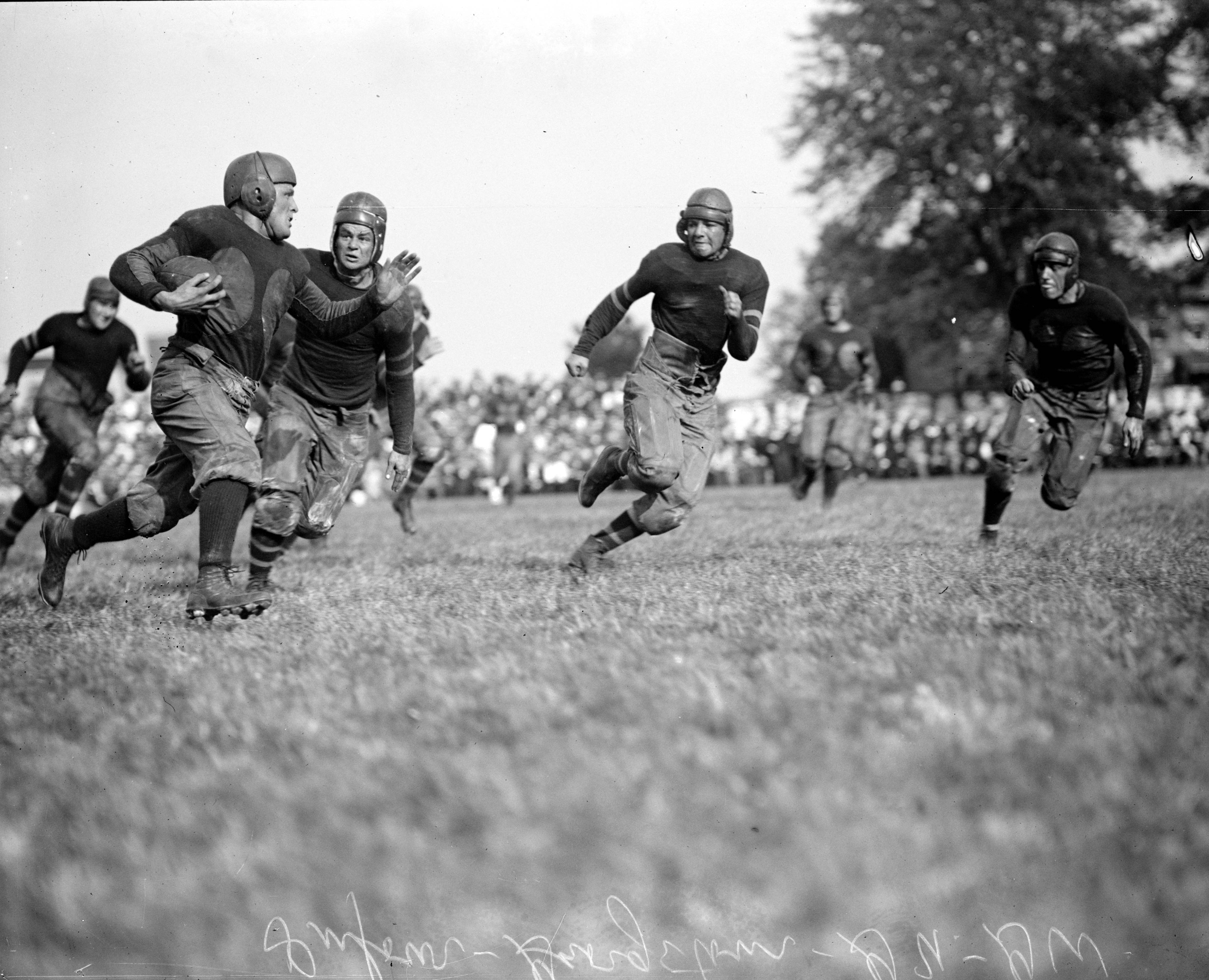
GWU v Georgetown game in 1923

H. Watson "Maud" Crum became the head football and basketball coach in 1924. He was the first to remain in that position with the "Hatchetites" for more than four years.

In 1928, the school's athletic teams were renamed the "Colonials". That year they were routed by Penn State, 50–0. Head coach James "Possum Jim" Pixlee took over the following season and led GW to a 0–8 record. Pixlee, however, later became George Washington's winningest coach in terms of number of wins (42). In 1930, GW routed the New York Aggies, 86–0.

In the 1930s and 1940s, GW gained nationwide media attention and scheduled top competition, starting with Alabama in 1932. The Colonials lost, 28–6, but that same year they beat Iowa, 21–6, and tied Oklahoma, 7–7. From 1933 to 1935, back Alphonse "Tuffy" Leemans set school records with 1,054 single-season rushing yards, 2,382 career rushing yards, 207 single-season carries, and 490 career carries. After college, he became a two-time All-NFL player for the New York Giants and was eventually inducted into the Pro Football Hall of Fame. From 1938 to 1941, Bill Reinhart, the Colonials' winningest baseball and basketball coach, also coached football. The football team, however, was mediocre under him, and, from 1943 to 1945, was discontinued due to World War II. Andy Davis played as GW quarterback from 1948 to 1951, and recorded 3,587 passing yards and 1,416 rushing yards. In 1952, the Colonials defeated Bucknell, 21–7, with the help of a block punt, an interception, and a fumble recovery. The loss was Bucknell's second in their past 20 games.

George Washington was a member of the Southern Conference for many years. In 1953, head coach Eugene "Bo" Sherman was named Southern Conference Coach of the Year and center Steve Korcheck was named Southern Conference Player of the Year. In 1956, GW ended the regular season 7–1–1. The lone defeat came against West Virginia, when reserve quarterback Alex Szuch's passing led the Mountaineers to victory, 14–0. They held Boston U to a tie, 20–20. The season's performance resulted in the team being invited to play in the 1957 Sun Bowl in El Paso, TX to face the host school, Texas Western (now known as UTEP). The Miners possessed a 9–1 record and were favored by a two-touchdown margin. The 17th-ranked Colonials, however, won, 13–0, to finish their most successful season with an 8–1 record.

Over the next three years, the Colonials compiled a 6–20 record. Bill Elias served as head coach in 1961 and improved the Colonials to a 5–3 mark from 1–8 the year prior. After the season, however, he left to take over at Virginia, a team that had a 28-game losing streak. From 1962 to 1966, James V. Camp served as head coach, and his teams posted a 22–35 record. Between 1961 and 1963, Dick Drummond rushed for 1,814 yards and was twice named All-Southern Conference. Garry Lyle, one of the last GW players to go on to an NFL career, did not consider the last Colonial teams to have been terrible. He recalled, however, that, "When I was a freshman, we played Army and I remember the varsity coming home and half of them wore casts."

The final George Washington football game to date came on Thanksgiving Day, November 24, 1966, when the team lost to Villanova, 16–7. It was GW's third loss in a row. GW ended the season with a 4–6 record (conference: 4–3) and Coach Camp was named Southern Conference Coach of the Year. GW President Dr. Lloyd H. Elliott reevaluated GW's football program; he said that GW had lost $254,000 on the football program during the 1966 season. Coach Camp resigned on December 19, 1966, because of the uncertainty of whether GW would retain its football program the following year.

On January 19, 1967, the board of trustees voted to end the football program. GW decided to use the football program's funding to build a new field house for the basketball team. Poor game attendance and the expense of the program contributed to the decision. A former GW player, Harry Ledford, believed that most people were unwilling to commute into Washington, D.C., which did not have metrorail at the time, on Friday nights to D.C. Stadium (later RFK), in what was perceived as an unsafe area. Additionally, Maryland and Virginia were nationally competitive teams that drew potential suburban spectators away from GW.

== Bowl games ==
Date	Coach	Bowl	Opponent	Result
1956	Bo Sherman	Sun Bowl	Texas Western	W 13–0
