= Bo Sherman =

American football and basketball coach

Biographical details
- Born: c. 1906
- Died: June 19, 1964 (aged 57); Charlottesville, Virginia, U.S.

Playing career

Football
- c. 1929: Henderson-Brown
- Positions: Fullback, tackle

Coaching career (HC unless noted)

Football
- 1931–1934: Henderson State
- 1935–1937: Arkansas A&M
- 1938–1939: Nashville HS (AR)
- 1940–1942: The Citadel (assistant)
- 1946–1947: Oklahoma City (assistant)
- 1948–1951: George Washington (assistant)
- 1952–1959: George Washington
- 1960: Houston (scout)
- 1961–1963: VMI (line)

Basketball
- 1931–1934: Henderson State
- 1942–1943: The Citadel
- 1946–1947: Oklahoma City

Head coaching record
- Overall: 56–62–3 (college football); 34–23 (college basketball); 9–11 (high school football)
- Bowls: 1–0

Accomplishments and honors

Championships
- Football; 3 AIC (1932–1934)

Eugene H. "Bo" Sherman (c. 1906 – June 19, 1964) was an American football and basketball coach. He served as the head football coach at Henderson State Teachers College—now known as Henderson State University—from 1931 to 1934, at Arkansas Agricultural and Mechanical College—now known as the University of Arkansas at Monticello—from 1935 to 1937, and at George Washington University from 1952 to 1959, compiling a career college football coaching record of 56–62–3. Sherman was a native of Dardanelle, Arkansas. He died on June 19, 1964, at the age of 57, at the University of Virginia Hospital in Charlottesville, Virginia.

== Head coaching record ==
=== College football ===
Year	Team	Overall	Conference	Standing	Bowl/playoffs	AP^{#}
Henderson State Reddies (Arkansas Intercollegiate Conference) (1931–1934)
1931	Henderson State	2–3	2–3			
1932	Henderson State	7–1	6–0	1st		
1933	Henderson State	7–1	5–0	1st		
1934	Henderson State	5–2	3–1	1st		
Henderson State:		21–7	16–4			
Arkansas A&M Boll Weevils (Arkansas Intercollegiate Conference) (1935–1937)
1935	Arkansas A&M	1–7				
1936	Arkansas A&M	2–5				
1937	Arkansas A&M	1–5				
Arkansas A&M:		4–17				
George Washington Colonials (Southern Conference) (1952–1959)
1952	George Washington	6–2–1	4–2–1	5th		
1953	George Washington	5–4	4–2	3rd		
1954	George Washington	1–7–1	0–4–1	8th		
1955	George Washington	5–4	3–2	T–3rd		
1956	George Washington	8–1–1	5–1	3rd	W Sun	17
1957	George Washington	2–7	1–5	9th		
1958	George Washington	3–5	3–2	3rd		
1959	George Washington	1–8	0–5	T–8th		
George Washington:		31–38–3	20–23–2			
Total:		56–62–3				
National championship Conference title Conference division title or championship game berth
^{#}Rankings from final AP Poll.

=== College basketball ===
Record table
Season	Team	Overall	Conference	Standing	Postseason
Henderson State Reddies (Arkansas Intercollegiate Conference) (1931–1934)
1931–32	Henderson State	7–0			
1932–33	Henderson State	6–4			
1933–34	Henderson State	6–5			
Henderson State:		19–9 (.679)			
The Citadel Bulldogs (Southern Conference) (1942–1943)
1942–43	The Citadel	8–4	5–3	5th	
The Citadel:		8–4 (.667)	5–3 (.625)		
Oklahoma City Chiefs (Independent) (1946–1947)
1946–47	Oklahoma City	7–9			
Oklahoma City:		7–9 (.438)			
Total:		34–23 (.596)			
National champion Postseason invitational champion Conference regular season champion Conference regular season and conference tournament champion Division regular season champion Division regular season and conference tournament champion Conference tournament champion

=== High school football ===
Year	Team	Overall	Conference	Standing	Bowl/playoffs
Nashville Scrappers () (1938–1939)
1938	Nashville	7–3			
1939	Nashville	2–8			
Nashville:		9–11			
Total:		9–11			
