= 2012 Sun Bowl =

American college football game

2012 Hyundai Sun Bowl
- 79th Sun Bowl
USC Trojans	Georgia Tech Yellow Jackets
(7–5)	(6–7)
Pac-12	ACC
7	21
Head coach: Lane Kiffin	Head coach: Paul Johnson
	1	2	3	4	Total
USC	0	7	0	0	7
Georgia Tech	0	7	7	7	21
- Date: December 31, 2012
- Season: 2012
- Stadium: Sun Bowl
- Location: El Paso, Texas
- MVP: Rod Sweeting
- Favorite: USC by 10
- Referee: Bill LeMonnier (Big Ten)
- Attendance: 47,922
- Payout: US$1.9 million per team

United States TV coverage
- Network: CBS; Sports USA Radio
- Announcers: Verne Lundquist (play-by-play); Gary Danielson (analyst); Tracy Wolfson (sidelines)

The 2012 Hyundai Sun Bowl, the 79th edition of the game, was a post-season American college football bowl game, held on December 31, 2012, at Sun Bowl Stadium in El Paso, Texas, as part of the 2012–13 NCAA Bowl season. The game, the 79th edition of the Sun Bowl, was televised in the United States on CBS.

The game featured the USC Trojans from the Pac-12 Conference (Pac-12) against the Georgia Tech Yellow Jackets from the Atlantic Coast Conference (ACC). The Trojans accepted their invitation to the game after attaining a 7–5 regular-season record, while the Yellow Jackets entered the game with a 6–7 record (5–3 ACC), after losing to Florida State in the 2012 ACC Championship Game. Georgia Tech had to request for a postseason waiver that was granted in order to participate as a result of the conference championship game the Yellow Jackets played under extenuating circumstances caused by sanctions on the two teams ahead of them in division standings.

Georgia Tech won the game in a 21–7 upset, thanks to a strong performance by the Yellow Jackets' defense. USC, which came into the game averaging more than 30 points per game, was limited to 7 points and 205 total yards. Georgia Tech cornerback Rod Sweeting was named the game's most valuable player.

== Teams ==
The 2012 Sun Bowl marked the 4th meeting between USC and Georgia Tech, with USC holding a 2–1 advantage coming into the bowl game. The previous meeting was on September 22, 1973, in a 29–18 win for the Trojans.

=== USC ===
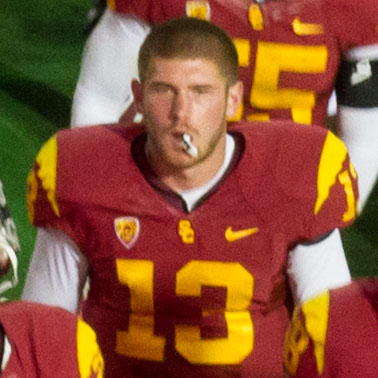
Max Wittek (pictured in November 2012) started at quarterback for USC in the 2012 Sun Bowl.

Coming off a two-year postseason ban, the Trojans had high hopes to return to their former glory in 2012, which were undoubtedly heightened by their preseason #1 ranking. USC started the season 6–1 and they appeared likely to at least make it back to the Rose Bowl. However, these plans were quickly dampened by the Trojans losing four of their last five games to finish at 7–5 and a second-place tie in the Pac-12 South Division. In addition, the Trojans lost their star quarterback Matt Barkley to injuries suffered in a game against rivals UCLA, leading to redshirt freshman Max Wittek to start the remaining USC games, including the 2012 Sun Bowl.

The Trojans came into the bowl game averaging more than 30-points per game. The USC offense was led by wide receivers Robert Woods and Fred Biletnikoff Award winner Marqise Lee, with the later coming into the game with 2,588 all-purpose yards. USC's offense was prone to turning the ball over, however, coming into the game with 31 turnovers. On defense, USC was led by defensive end Morgan Breslin, who came into the game with 12 sacks. The Trojans' rushing defense was average, however, as USC ranked 59th nationally against the run.

This was the Trojans' third Sun Bowl; they had previously appeared in the 1990 game against the Michigan State Spartans and again in the 1998 game against the TCU Horned Frogs, losing both games by scores of 17–16 and 28–19, respectively. The Sun Bowl also marked USC's first bowl game since the 2009 Emerald Bowl.

=== Georgia Tech ===
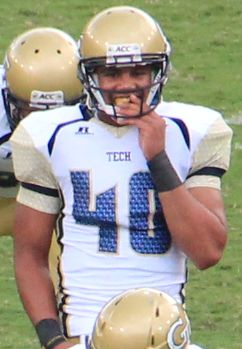
Tevin Washington (pictured in September 2012) led the Yellow Jackets in rushing touchdowns in 2012.

Georgia Tech started the season poorly, going 2–4 in their first six games. However, the Yellow Jackets won four of their last six games to end the regular season with a 5–3 conference record and a 6–6 record overall, making them bowl-eligible initially. The Yellow Jackets finished in a three-way tie for first-place in the ACC's Coastal Division. However, both teams they were tied with (the North Carolina Tar Heels and Miami Hurricanes) were banned from the postseason that year (one by the NCAA and another self-imposed), leaving the Yellow Jackets as the only such team eligible for the 2012 ACC Championship Game. The ACC and the school filed a bowl waiver with the NCAA, which was promptly granted, to assure that the Yellow Jackets would be able to play in a bowl game in case they were to drop to a 6–7 record after a loss in the championship game. They lost to the Florida State Seminoles by a score of 21–15, but still were in solid position for the Sun Bowl's invite.

Like with USC, Georgia Tech came into the game with an offense that averaged more than 30 points per game. With its triple option offense, Georgia Tech averaged 312.5 rushing yards per game, which was fourth in the FBS. Leading the offense was quarterback Tevin Washington, who led the team with 19 rushing touchdowns. The Yellow Jackets' defensive unit came into the game allowing an average of 30 points per game. Defensive coordinator Al Groh was fired midway through the season after poor defensive performances against Miami Hurricanes, MTSU and Clemson. Due to Georgia Tech's porous defense, the Yellow Jackets came into the game as underdogs.

This was the Yellow Jackets' third Sun Bowl; they had previously won the 1970 game over the Texas Tech Red Raiders by a score of 17–9, and they would later lose the 2011 game to the Utah Utes by a score of 30–27 in overtime. The 2012 Sun Bowl also marked Georgia Tech's 16th consecutive bowl game. Georgia Tech was coming into the game with a seven-game bowl losing streak.

== Game summary ==
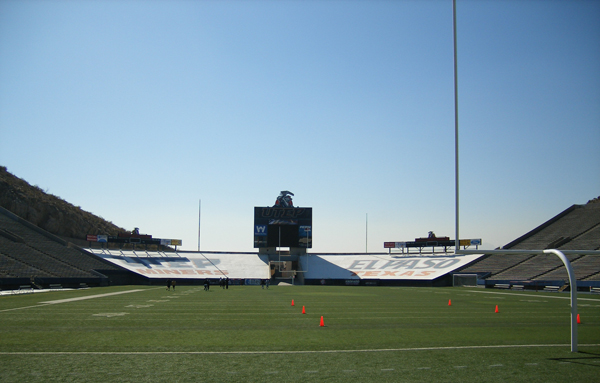
The 2012 Sun Bowl was played at Sun Bowl Stadium.

=== First half ===
In the first quarter, USC appeared to have scored first on a 38-yard field goal. However, the play was reviewed and the field goal was overturned after replay showed the kick sailing wide left. The rest of the first quarter remained scoreless. In the second quarter, the Yellow Jackets went up 7–0 on a 3-yard touchdown pass from quarterback Vad Lee to David Sims. Georgia Tech's defense was then able to force USC to punt. However, on the ensuing drive, quarterback Vad Lee threw an interception to USC's Lamar Dawson. USC was unable to take advantage of the interception, however, and quickly gave the ball back to Georgia Tech after Georgia Tech's Rod Sweeting intercepted Max Wittek. Georgia Tech's next possession was also short lived, after USC's Morgan Breslin forced Tech's Vad Lee to fumble. Taking advantage of the fumble, USC tied the game 7–7 on a 9-yard touchdown pass from Max Wittek to Silas Redd. The score remained tied 7–7 going into the half.

=== Second half ===
Georgia Tech's defense forced USC to punt on the Trojans' first possession of the second half. On the ensuing punt return, Georgia Tech's Jamal Golden returned the punt 56 yards to the USC 1-yard line. Two plays later, Georgia Tech took the lead, 14–7, on a 1-yard touchdown run from quarterback Tevin Washington. Near the end of the third quarter, USC drove to Georgia Tech's 38-yard line. However, the Trojans were unable to convert a fourth and 4 play, turning the ball on downs.

External image
- GT vs. USC 12/31/12

Taking advantage of the turnover on downs, Georgia Tech further extended their lead to 21–7 on a 17-yard touchdown pass from Tevin Washington to Orwin Smith. After being forced to a three-and-out, Trojan punter Kyle Negrete pinned Georgia Tech at the Yellow Jackets' 5-yard line. Georgia Tech drove from their own 5-yard line to USC's 26-yard line. However, the Yellow Jackets gave the ball back to the Trojans after being unable to convert a fourth and 4 play. On the ensuing USC drive, the Trojans drove to the Yellow Jackets' 4-yard line. The Trojans were unable to score, however, after Georgia Tech's Quayshawn Nealy intercepted USC's Max Wittek's pass in the endzone. USC had one more chance to cut into the lead after forcing Georgia Tech to punt with 1:41 left in regulation. Helped by several Tech penalties, USC once again drove deep into Georgia Tech territory, this time to the 14-yard line. The Trojans were still unable to score, however, and Georgia Tech sealed its first bowl victory since 2004 after Max Wittek threw an interception to Georgia Tech's Jamal Golden with 1:04 remaining in regulation.

== Scoring summary ==
Scoring summary

Quarter	Time	Drive			Team	Scoring information	Score	
Quarter	Time	Plays	Yards	TOP	Team	Scoring information	USC	Georgia Tech
2	10:41	14	74	6:53	Georgia Tech	David Sims 3-yard touchdown reception from Vad Lee, Chris Tanner kick good	0	7
2	0:49	8	59	2:53	USC	Silas Redd 9-yard touchdown reception from Max Wittek, Andre Heidari kick good	7	7
3	12:23	2	1	0:44	Georgia Tech	Tevin Washington 1-yard touchdown run, Chris Tanner kick good	7	14
4	13:11	9	62	4:31	Georgia Tech	Orwin Smith 17-yard touchdown reception from Tevin Washington, Chris Tanner kick good	7	21
"TOP" = time of possession. For other American football terms, see Glossary of American football.							7	21

== Statistical summary ==
Statistics	USC	GT
First downs	10	18
Total offense, plays - yards	59-205	73-369
Rushes-yards (net)	22-98	63-294
Passing yards (net)	107	75
Passes, Comp-Att-Int	14-37-3	5-10-1
Time of Possession	23:35	36:25

Georgia Tech's defense dominated the game, as Georgia Tech allowed only 205 yards of total offense and held USC to a season low 7 points. USC quarterback Max Wittek completed only 14 of his 37 passes for 107 yards and threw 3 interceptions. In addition, wide receivers Marqise Lee and Robert Woods were held to only 41-yards and 33-yards of receiving respectively.

The Yellow Jackets also did not have a lot of passing yards, as Georgia Tech had a combined 75 passing yards from quarterbacks Tevin Washington and Vad Lee.

Georgia Tech's leading rusher was David Sims, who rushed the ball 17 times for 99 yards. Zach Laskey was Georgia Tech's no. 2 rusher, who rushed the ball 6 times for 60 yards. Overall, Georgia Tech rushed the ball for 294 yards. USC's leading rusher was Silas Redd, who rushed for 88 yards on 17 carries. Curtis McNeal was USC's no. 2 rusher, rushing the ball only 5-yards on 3 carries.
