= UTEP Miners football =

American football team

2026 UTEP Miners football team
- First season: 1914; 112 years ago
- Athletic director: Jim Senter
- Head coach: Vacant
- Location: El Paso, Texas
- Stadium: Sun Bowl (capacity: 51,500 Record: 54,021)
- NCAA division: Division I FBS
- Conference: Mountain West
- Colors: Dark blue, orange, and silver accent
- All-time record: 415–654–30 (.391)
- Bowl record: 5–10 (.333)

Conference championships
- Border: 1956 WAC: 2000
- Consensus All-Americans: 1
- Rivalries: New Mexico State (rivalry); New Mexico (rivalry)
- Fight song: "El Paso Fight"
- Mascot: Paydirt Pete
- Marching band: Sound of the Southwest
- Website: UTEPAthletics.com

The UTEP Miners football program represents University of Texas at El Paso (UTEP) in college football and competes in the NCAA Division I Football Bowl Subdivision (FBS) as a member of the Mountain West Conference. The Miners play their home games at the Sun Bowl which has a seating capacity of 51,500. They are coached by Scotty Walden. UTEP has produced a Border Conference championship team in 1956 and a Western Athletic Conference championship team in 2000, along with 15 postseason bowl appearances.

== History ==
The University of Texas at El Paso (then known as the State College of Mines and Metallurgy) fielded its first intercollegiate football team during the 1914 season. Since its founding, the school has been known as the "Miners", a moniker used to reflect the original pedagogy of the university. First competing as an independent, UTEP joined the Border Intercollegiate Athletic Conference, also known as the Border Conference, in 1932. In 1956, the team won its first-conference championship and received an invite to the Sun Bowl, under then-head coach Mike Brumbelow. In 1962, the team left the Border Conference to become independent, before joining the Western Athletic Conference (WAC) in 1968. Up until that point, the team had made eight bowl appearances, all in the Sun Bowl, and accumulated a record of 5–3.

The team left the WAC in 2005 to join Conference USA, where it has played since. In October 2024, the university accepted an offer to join the Mountain West Conference, starting in the 2026–27 academic year.

== Conference affiliations ==
UTEP has competed as a member of three different conferences since 1914. Following the 2025 season and the 2025–26 year, the team will move from Conference USA to the Mountain West Conference.

- Independent (1914–1934)
- Border Conference (1935–1961)
- Independent (1962–1967)
- Western Athletic Conference (1968–2004)
- Conference USA (2005–2025)
- Mountain West Conference (2026–present)

== Conference championships ==
UTEP has won two conference championships, one outright and one shared. In 1956 the UTEP Miners finished the year with a 9–2 overall record and a 5–0 in conference to win the Border Conference and its first conference champions title. The season included wins over Arizona, Arizona State, and Texas Tech. The Miners were defeated by North Texas that year. Forty-four years later in 2000, the Miners shared the Western Athletic Conference Champions title with TCU. UTEP finished 8–4 overall record and a 7–1 in conference. The season included wins over Fresno State, Rice, and SMU. The Miners were defeated by TCU, its only loss in conference play.

Season	Conference	Coach	Overall Record	Conference Record
1956	Border Conference	Mike Brumbelow	9–2	5–0
2000†	Western Athletic Conference	Gary Nord	8–4	7–1

† Co-champions

== Head coaches ==
UTEP has had 26 head coaches, and one-interim head coach. Two coaches have won conference championships with the Miners: Mike Brumbelow and Gary Nord. As of the 2025 season, Mack Saxon is the all-time leader in games and program wins, while Brumbelow has the highest winning percentage .651. Since the 2024 season, the team has been led by Scotty Walden, who previously served as head coach at Austin Peay State University.

== Bowl games ==
UTEP has played in fifteen bowl games, compiling a record of 5–10. They have not won a bowl game since 1967, the longest drought among NCAA Division I FBS teams and a drought of 56 years.

Season	Coach	Bowl	Opponent	Result
1936	Mack Saxon	Sun Bowl	Hardin–Simmons	L 6–34
1948	Jack Curtice	Sun Bowl	West Virginia	L 12–21
1949	Jack Curtice	Sun Bowl	Georgetown	W 33–20
1953	Mike Brumbelow	Sun Bowl	Southern Miss	W 37–14
1954	Mike Brumbelow	Sun Bowl	Florida State	W 47–20
1956	Mike Brumbelow	Sun Bowl	George Washington	L 0–13
1965	Bobby Dobbs	Sun Bowl	TCU	W 13–12
1967	Bobby Dobbs	Sun Bowl	Ole Miss	W 14–7
1988	Bob Stull	Independence Bowl	Southern Miss	L 18–38
2000	Gary Nord	Humanitarian Bowl	Boise State	L 23–38
2004	Mike Price	Houston Bowl	Colorado	L 28–33
2005	Mike Price	GMAC Bowl	Toledo	L 13–45
2010	Mike Price	New Mexico Bowl	BYU	L 24–52
2014	Sean Kugler	New Mexico Bowl	Utah State	L 6–21
2021	Dana Dimel	New Mexico Bowl	Fresno State	L 24–31

== Home stadium ==
Since 1963, UTEP has played at the Sun Bowl. From 1938 to 1962, they played at Kidd Field.

== Rivalries ==
=== New Mexico State ===
The Battle of I-10 Rivalry is named for the New Mexico State-UTEP rivalry. The 110–year–old series has had many exciting finishes in its storied history. UTEP holds the series lead at 60–39–2, largely due to dominance in the series from the 1920s to the 1960s. The rivalry is either played in El Paso or Las Cruces, New Mexico.

New Mexico State–UTEP: All–Time Record
Games played	First meeting	Last meeting	UTEP wins	UTEP losses	UTEP Ties
101	October 31, 1914 (Lost 0–19)	November 30, 2024 (Won 42–35)	60	39	2

== National award winners ==
Amos Alonzo Stagg Award

Jack Curtice (1972)

== All-Americans ==
- Fred Carr, LB – 1967 (NEA-1; Time-1st; TSN-1st; CP-2nd)
- Charlie West, DB – 1967 (NEA-2nd; Time-1st; TSN-1st)
- Dennis Bramlett, C – 1969 (NEA-2nd)
- Kyran Duhon, DE – 2024 (CFN Freshman All-American)

== Miners in the NFL ==
As of 2026, UTEP has had 91 players selected in the NFL Draft, including two players selected in the first round.

First round draft picks

Name	Position	Year	Overall pick	Team
Fred Carr	LB	1968	5	Green Bay Packers
George Daney	G	1968	22	Kansas City Chiefs

=== Active NFL ===
As of May 2026

- Aaron Jones – Minnesota Vikings
- Roy Robertson-Harris – New York Giants
- Tyrice Knight – Seattle Seahawks
- Elijah Klein – Tampa Bay Buccaneers
- Andrew Meyer – Miami Dolphins

== Future non-conference opponents ==
Announced schedules as of September 11, 2026.

2026	2027	2028	2029	2030	2031	2032
at Oklahoma (9/5)	at Boston College (9/4)	at Nebraska (9/2)	at Texas (9/15)	at Oregon State (9/21)	North Texas (9/6)	Texas Tech (9/18)
Texas Southern (9/12)	at Texas (9/11)	Utah State (9/9)			at Texas (9/13)	
at Michigan (9/19)	Houston Christian TBA	Texas State (9/16)			at Texas State (9/27)	
Oregon State (9/26)		at North Texas (9/23)				
