= Rod Sweeting =

American gridiron football player (born 1990)

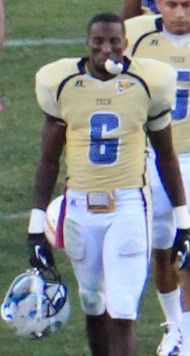
- Sweeting in 2012

No. 38, 35
- Position: Cornerback

Personal information
- Born: September 28, 1990 (age 36); Miami, Florida, U.S.
- Listed height: 5 ft 11 in (1.80 m)
- Listed weight: 190 lb (86 kg)

Career information
- High school: Locust Grove (GA) Luella
- College: Georgia Tech
- NFL draft: 2013: undrafted

Career history
- New Orleans Saints (2013); Miami Dolphins (2014)*; Buffalo Bills (2014–2015)*; Dallas Cowboys (2015); Toronto Argonauts (2016)
- * Offseason or practice squad member only

Awards and highlights
- 2012 Hyundai Sun Bowl Most Valuable Player
- Stats at Pro Football Reference

Roderick Hilary Sweeting (born September 28, 1990) is an American former professional football cornerback. He played college football for the Georgia Tech Yellow Jackets.

== Early life ==
Sweeting attended Luella High School in Locust Grove, Georgia. He was named a 2008 Georgia Class 5A first team all-state selection, and a two-time first team all-region, and also earned Golden Helmet Award for academic and athletic performance and was team MVP in 2008. He had 36 receptions for 723 yards and 10 touchdowns as a senior, while defensively, he recorded 58 tackles and two interceptions and also served as a kickoff and punt returner. In his junior season, he recorded 58 tackles, one interception, one blocked field goal, one fumble recovery and a 99-yard kickoff return. He earned three varsity letters in football and served two years as team captain.

Considered a three-star recruit by Rivals.com, he was rated as the 45th best cornerback in the nation. He accepted a scholarship from Georgia Tech over offers from Mississippi State, West Virginia, and Virginia Tech.

== College career ==
As a true freshman in 2009, he was one of seven true freshmen to see action. He played in all 14 games as a reserve in the secondary and on special teams, and recorded eight tackles including seven solos. In 2011, he played in all 13 games, recording 38 tackles (27 solo tackles) and one tackle for loss, one interception and one fumble recovery, while his seven pass break-ups ranked second on the team. As a junior, he started all 13 games at cornerback. His three interceptions tied for the team lead and ranked tied for 10th in the ACC and was tied for fifth in the ACC in pass break-ups (10). He recorded 56 tackles (37 solos), three tackles for loss, two forced fumbles and one fumble recovery while earning an all-conference honorable mention selection. In his senior season, he played and started in all 14 games, and was the Most Valuable Player of the 2012 Hyundai Sun Bowl. He recorded 58 tackles including 42 solo tackles, produced six tackles for loss and a sack, had one interception, a team-high seven pass break-ups and recovered one fumble.

== Professional career ==
=== NFL draft ===
Sweeting played in the East–West Shrine Game and was timed as one of the fastest cornerbacks at the NFL Scouting Combine. He was rated as a mid-to-late round prospect in the 2013 NFL draft, but he was not drafted

=== New Orleans Saints ===
As an undrafted free agent, Sweeting was signed by the New Orleans Saints on April 27, 2013. The Saints released Sweeting on August 26, 2014.

=== Miami Dolphins ===
On September 17, 2014, Sweeting was signed to the Miami Dolphins' practice squad. On September 30, 2014, he was released by the Dolphins. On October 14, 2014, he was re-signed to the Dolphins' practice squad. On October 28, 2014, he was released by the Dolphins.

=== Buffalo Bills ===
On November 4, 2014, Sweeting was signed by the Buffalo Bills to their practice squad. On August 19, 2015, he was waived by the Bills.

=== Dallas Cowboys ===
On August 20, 2015, Sweeting was claimed off waivers by the Dallas Cowboys. On September 5, 2015, he was waived-injured by the Cowboys. On the following day, he cleared waivers and was reverted to the Cowboys' injured reserve list. On September 25, 2015, Sweeting was released by the Cowboys with an injury settlement.

=== Toronto Argonauts ===
On September 13, 2016, Sweeting was signed to the Toronto Argonauts' practice roster. He played in one game for the Argonauts in 2016.
