= Mike Brumbelow =

American football and basketball player and coach (1906–1977)

Biographical details
- Born: July 13, 1906; Jacksboro, Texas, U.S.
- Died: August 11, 1977 (aged 71); El Paso, Texas, U.S.

Playing career

Football
- 1927–1929: TCU
- Position: Guard

Coaching career (HC unless noted)

Football
- 1936–1941: TCU (assistant)
- 1942: Georgia Pre-Flight (line)
- 1946–1948: Ole Miss (assistant)
- 1949: SMU (scout)
- 1950–1956: Texas Western

Basketball
- 1937–1941: TCU

Administrative career (AD unless noted)
- 1950–1959: Texas Western

Head coaching record
- Overall: 46–24–3 (football); 22–64 (basketball)
- Bowls: 2–1

Accomplishments and honors

Championships
- Football; 1 Border (1956)

Awards
- Third-team All-American (1929); First-team All-SWC (1929)

Lester Michael Brumbelow (July 13, 1906 – August 11, 1977) was an American college football and college basketball player and coach. He played football and basketball for Texas Christian University from 1927 to 1929 and was the captain and most valuable player of the TCU Horned Frogs undefeated 1929 football team that won the school's first Southwest Conference championship. He later served as an assistant football coach and head basketball coach at TCU from 1936 to 1941. He served in the U.S. Navy during World War II in the athletics program at the Navy Pre-Flight School, and attained the rank of lieutenant commander. After the war, he served as an assistant football coach at the University of Mississippi from 1946 to 1948. From 1950 to 1956 he was the head football coach at Texas Western College, now the University of Texas at El Paso; he also served as the school's athletic director from 1950 to 1959.

== Early life ==
Brumbelow grew up in Jacksboro, Texas. He was the son of William Brumbelow and Alice Helton Brumbelow, a ranching and farming family in Jack County, Texas.

== Athlete at TCU ==
Brumbelow attended TCU. He played at the guard position from 1927 to 1929 and was selected as the captain and most valuable player on TCU's undefeated 1929 football team that won the school's first Southwest Conference championship. Brumbelow was selected as an All-American in 1929 and an All-Southwest Conference player in both 1928 and 1929. He also won the 1929 Rogers Trophy Award and played in the 1930 East–West Shrine Game. Brumbelow also played basketball at TCU and received two varsity letters in that sport. He was inducted into the TCU Lettermen's Association Hall of Fame in 1970.

== Coaching career ==
=== High school coach ===
Brumbelow began a coaching career as a high school football coach in El Paso, Texas, from 1930 to 1931, and subsequently at Lufkin, Texas.

=== TCU ===
In June 1936, Brumbelow was hired as the line coach at TCU. He continued to serve as TCU's line coach through the 1941 season. Brumbelow also served as the head coach of the basketball team at TCU from 1937 to 1941. In four seasons as TCU's head basketball coach, the team compiled a record of 22–64.

=== Military service ===
Brumbelow entered the U.S. Navy during World War II with the rank of lieutenant. In 1942, he served as the line coach of the football team at the Navy Pre-Flight School in Athens, Georgia. He was promoted to head coach in January 1943, and in April 1943 was placed in charge of the entire nine sport program for the 2,400 cadets at the Pre-Flight School. He was discharged from the Navy in November 1945 with the rank of lieutenant commander.

=== Mississippi and SMU ===
In August 1946, Brumbelow was hired as an assistant football coach at the University of Mississippi. He served as the line coach at Mississippi from 1946 to 1948. During the 1949 football season, he scouted opposing schools for Southern Methodist University.

=== UTEP ===
In June 1950, Brumbelow was hired as the head football coach and athletic director University of Texas at El Paso (then known as Texas Western College). He had been operating sporting goods stores at Midland and Odessa, Texas (in partnership with Tex Carleton) at the time of his hiring at UTEP. Brumbelow served as head football coach at UTEP from 1950 to 1956. He had a successful tenure as coach, guiding his teams to a 46–24–3 record. The team won eight or more games three times, in 1953, 1954 and 1956. He led UTEP to appearances in the 1954 Sun Bowl, 1955 Sun Bowl, and 1957 Sun Bowl, two of which UTEP won. He is responsible for UTEP's only outright conference championship when his 1956 team went 5–0 in Border Conference play. Brumbelow retired as UTEP's football coach in July 1957 and as athletic director in 1959. He was inducted into El Paso Athletic Hall of Fame in 1964, and the UTEP Athletic Hall of Fame in 2007.

== Later years ==
After retiring as UTEP's athletic director in 1959, Brumbelow worked in the advertising and public relations department of the El Paso Natural Gas Co. He was one of the leaders in the effort to build the Sun Bowl in El Paso and helped get a bond issue passed to finance its construction. He later served as the president of Sun Travel.

At the age of 71, Brumbelow died at Providence Memorial Hospital in El Paso after a long illness. He was survived by his wife Marjorie (Klein) Brumbelow and a daughter, Nancy (Brumbelow) Sisk.

== Head coaching record ==
=== Football ===
Year	Team	Overall	Conference	Standing	Bowl/playoffs
Texas Western Miners (Border Conference) (1950–1956)
1950	Texas Western	7–3	4–2	3rd	
1951	Texas Western	3–7	3–4	5th	
1952	Texas Western	5–5–1	2–3–1	5th	
1953	Texas Western	8–2	4–2	3rd	W Sun
1954	Texas Western	8–3	4–2	3rd	W Sun
1955	Texas Western	6–2–2	3–2–1	4th	
1956	Texas Western	9–2	5–0	1st	L Sun
Texas Western:		46–24–3	25–15–2		
Total:		46–24–3			
