= Max Wittek =

American football player (born 1993)

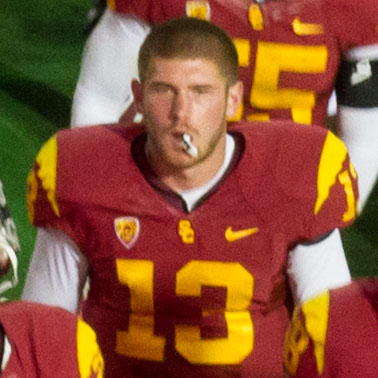
- Wittek during the 2012 season with the USC Trojans

No. 6
- Position: Quarterback

Personal information
- Born: July 31, 1993 (age 33); San Ramon, California, U.S.
- Listed height: 6 ft 4 in (1.93 m)
- Listed weight: 236 lb (107 kg)

Career information
- High school: Mater Dei (Santa Ana, California)
- College: USC (2011–2013); Hawaii (2014–2015)
- NFL draft: 2016: undrafted

Career history
- Jacksonville Jaguars (2016)*
- * Offseason or practice squad member only

Max Nolan Wittek (born July 31, 1993) is an American former football quarterback. He played at USC from 2011 to 2013, and transferred to Hawaii, sitting out the 2014 season.

== Early life ==
Born in Contra Costa County, California, Wittek grew up in Norwalk, Connecticut but later moved to Santa Ana, California, where he attended Mater Dei High School. His immediate predecessor as starting quarterback for Mater Dei was future USC teammate Matt Barkley. As a senior, he completed 153 of 282 passes for 2,252 yards with 24 touchdowns and 15 interceptions. He was ranked as the third best pro-style quarterback recruit in his class by Rivals.com. He committed to USC in April 2010.

== College career ==
Wittek was redshirted as a freshman in 2011. As a redshirt freshman in 2012, Wittek won the backup job to Matt Barkley. Wittek made his first career start on November 24, 2012, after Barkley suffered a sprained AC joint in his right shoulder. Prior to that game, he had completed eight of nine passes for 95 yards with a touchdown.

Scheduled to start his first USC game against rival and No. 1 ranked Notre Dame, Wittek made a stir by asserting his confidence in a Trojans victory: "I'm going to go out there, and I'm going to play within myself, within the system, and we're gonna win this ballgame." Notre Dame defeated USC 22–13 to advance to the 2013 BCS National Championship Game. Wittek threw for 186 yards, one touchdown and two interceptions.

For the 2013 season, he and Cody Kessler competed for the starting job. He eventually lost the quarterback competition by the second week of the season.

In January 2014, Wittek decided to pursue a master's degree and compete for a QB position at another university. In August, Wittek eventually announced his intention to transfer to Hawaii.

In September 2015 for Hawaii, Wittek threw for 202 yards and three touchdown passes in a 28–20 win over Colorado, in the season opener for both teams. Wittek started in 8 of Hawaii's first 9 games before injuring his right knee and later being diagnosed with chondromalacia, a degenerative knee condition. In those games he completed less than 50 percent of his passes and threw just 7 touchdowns against 13 interceptions. His season ended in November when he was scheduled for surgery on his right knee. Wittek reportedly was slowed by sore knees as well as a foot injury. He finished the season with those statistics, including 1,542 yards passing as Hawaii completed the 2015 season with a 3–10 record.

== Professional career ==
On May 1, 2016, Wittek signed with the Jacksonville Jaguars. He was waived from their roster August 23.
