= 1955 Sun Bowl =

American college football game

| Florida State Seminoles | Texas Western Miners |
| (8–3) | (7–3) |
| Independent | Border Conference |
| 20 | 47 |
| Head coach: Tom Nugent | Head coach: Mike Brumbelow |
| | 1 | 2 | 3 | 4 | Total |
|---|---|---|---|---|---|
| Florida State | 7 | 0 | 6 | 7 | 20 |
| Texas Western | 7 | 27 | 13 | 0 | 47 |
- Date: January 1, 1955
- Season: 1954
- Stadium: Kidd Field
- Location: El Paso, Texas
- MVP: QB Jesse Whittenton (Texas Western)
- Attendance: 14,000

The 1955 Sun Bowl was a college football postseason bowl game that featured the Texas Western Miners and the Florida State Seminoles.

== Background ==
The Miners finished 3rd in the Border Intercollegiate Athletic Association in their second straight Sun Bowl, and fourth Sun Bowl in six years. As for the Seminoles, a 3–3 start ended with 5 straight wins to close out the regular season. This was their first Bowl since the 1950 Cigar Bowl.

== Game summary ==
Harry Massey scored on a 1-yard touchdown run to give the Seminoles an early 7–0 lead, set up by a 25-yard kickoff return and a 48-yard rush both by Lee Corso. After Florida State lost both Corso (on a collision) and the ball after an ensuing punt, the Miners took advantage, scoring on a Rusty Rutledge touchdown catch from Jesse Whittenton to make it 7–7 after one quarter. In the second, the Miners exploded for 27 points. Whittenton ran for a touchdown run from 7 yards out to make it 13–7. Bob Forrest scored on a 45-yard touchdown run to make it 20–7. Whittenton threw his 2nd touchdown pass to make it 27–7. He then threw a pass to Rutledge from 16 yards out to make it 34–7 at halftime. Forrest scored once again to make it 41–7 Miners. The Seminoles finally responded with a Len Swantic touchdown pass to make it 41–13 (after the kick was blocked). Whittenton made it 47–13 on his 2-yard touchdown plunge. In the fourth quarter, the only score was on a Larry Massey touchdown pass to make it 47–20. Future actor Burt Reynolds rushed for 35 yards on 7 carries for Florida State. Whittenton went 7 of 13 for 138 yards and three touchdowns passing and two touchdowns on 13 yards (on 8 carries) rushing in an MVP effort. The attendance for the game was estimated at 14,000.

=== Scoring summary ===
- 1st - Florida State - Massey 1-yard run (Graham kick)
- 1st - Texas Western - Rutledge 56-yard pass from Whittenton (Whittenton kick)
- 2nd - Texas Western - Whittenton 7-yard run (kick failed)
- 2nd - Texas Western - B. Forrest 45-yard run (Whittenton kick)
- 2nd - Texas Western - D. Forrest 19-yard pass from Whittenton (Whittenton kick)
- 2nd - Texas Western - Rutledge 16-yard pass from Whittenton (Whittenton kick)
- 3rd - Texas Western - B. Forrest 11-yard run (Whittenton kick)
- 3rd - Florida State - Feamster 45-yard pass from Swantic (kick blocked)
- 3rd - Texas Western - Whittenton 2-yard run (kick failed)
- 4th - Florida State - Odom 16-yard pass from Massey (Graham kick)

== Aftermath ==
The Miners went to the Sun Bowl thrice more in the next 12 years. As for Florida State, they returned once in 1966.

== Statistics ==
| Statistics | Texas Western | Florida State |
|---|---|---|
| First downs | 17 | 13 |
| Yards rushing | 253 | 139 |
| Yards passing | 149 | 155 |
| Total yards | 402 | 294 |
| Punts-Average | 4–44.0 | 6–26.6 |
| Fumbles-Lost | 2–2 | 3–2 |
| Interceptions Thrown | 0 | 2 |
| Penalties-Yards | 7–65 | 3–25 |
