= 1957 Sun Bowl =

American college football game

George Washington Colonials	Texas Western Miners
(7–1–1)	(9–1)
Southern Conference	Border Conference
13	0
Head coach: Bo Sherman	Head coach: Mike Brumbelow
AP / Coaches; 17 / NR
	1	2	3	4	Total
George Washington	7	0	0	6	13
Texas Western	0	0	0	0	0
- Date: January 1, 1957
- Season: 1956
- Stadium: Kidd Field
- Location: El Paso, Texas
- MVP: RB Claude Austin
- Favorite: Miners by 14
- Referee: Burns McKinney (Border; split crew: Border, Southern)

The 1957 Sun Bowl was a college football postseason bowl game between the George Washington Colonials and the Texas Western Miners.

== Background ==
The Miners were in their fourth Sun Bowl of the 1950s in the final year for coach Mike Brumbelow. Don Maynard was part of the Miner backfield. The Miners won the Border Intercollegiate Athletic Association championship with a 5-0 conference record, their first ever conference title. The Colonials had just one loss on the season (to West Virginia) and one tie (to Boston) while finishing second in the Southern Conference, but the Colonials were 17th ranked going into their first ever bowl game, though the Miners were favored due to the game being played at the Miners' home field.

== Game summary ==
Defense proved to be the key ingredient for victory, as the Colonials forced six turnovers and scored a few points of their own in the process. While the Miners stopped the Colonials twice in the first quarter near the endzone, they could not stop them the third time as Ray Looney threw a pass to Paul Thompson, who ran into the end zone for the touchdown. Only 28% of the passes in the game combined were caught (7 out of 25), with three being intercepted. Ted Colna intercepted a pass and Pete Spera ran in for a touchdown to seal the game for the Colonials in the fourth. Claude Austin ran for 98 yards on 18 carries to earn MVP honors. This was the first shutout since Southwestern did it against Mexico in 1945.

== Aftermath ==
The Colonials would not return to a bowl game before they disbanded in 1967. The Miners would return to the Sun Bowl eight years later.

== Statistics ==
Statistics	GWU	Texas Western
First downs	14	10
Yards rushing	257	146
Yards passing	61	22
Return yards	18	68
Total yards	336	236
Punts-Average	7-33	8-34
Fumbles-Lost	3-2	3-3
Interceptions	0	3
Penalties-Yards	7-55	3-45
