= 1954 Sun Bowl =

American college football game

- 20th Sun Bowl
Mississippi Southern Southerners	Texas Western Miners
(9–1)	(7–2)
Independent	Border Conference
14	37
Head coach: Thad Vann	Head coach: Mike Brumbelow
	1	2	3	4	Total
Mississippi Southern	0	7	7	0	14
Texas Western	14	16	7	0	37
- Date: January 1, 1954
- Season: 1953
- Stadium: Kidd Field
- Location: El Paso, Texas
- MVP: QB Dick Shinaut (Texas Western)
- Referee: W.H. Kisner (Border; split crew: Border, SEC)

The 1954 Sun Bowl was a college football postseason bowl game that featured the Texas Western Miners and the Mississippi Southern Southerners.

== Background ==
The Miners had a two-game improvement while finishing third in the Border Intercollegiate Athletic Association. One particular highlight for the Golden Eagles was upsetting Alabama (who went on to play Rice in the Cotton Bowl Classic that year). This was the second straight Sun Bowl appearance for Mississippi Southern, and the third in five years for Texas Western.

== Game summary ==
Dick Shinaut returned a kickoff 48 yards to give Texas Western good field position. On the next play, Clovis Riley had run 54 yards to the goal line, until he was hit and fumbled the ball, but John Howle recovered the ball in the end zone to give the Miners a 7–0 lead. Shinaut then threw a touchdown pass to Jesse Whittenton on a screen pass formation that went for 25 yards. Shinaut made it 17–0 in the second quarter on his 25-yard field goal. Howle caught a 44-yard touchdown pass from Shinaut to make it 24–0. A Texas Western touchdown run by Joel McCormick made it 30–0. Mississippi Southern responded with two touchdowns of their own (one on a Tommie Wood touchdown catch from Billy Jarrell and the other on a 13-yard touchdown run by Fred Smallwood) to make it 30–14 in the third quarter. But the Miners responded with a touchdown by Riley from 43 yards out to make it 37–14. Riley rushed for 112 yards on 12 carries. Dick Shinaut went 11 of 17 for 158 yards, while kicking four extra points and a field goal in an MVP effort.

=== Scoring summary ===
- 1st – Texas Western - Howle 1-yard fumble return (Shinaut kick)
- 1st - Texas Western - Whittenton 25-yard pass from Shinaut (Shinaut kick)
- 2nd - Texas Western - Shinaut 25-yard field goal
- 2nd - Texas Western - Howle 44-yard pass from Shinaut (Shinaut kick)
- 2nd - Texas Western - McCormick 2-yard run (kick failed)
- 2nd - Mississippi Southern - Wood 12-yard pass from Jarrell (McElroy kick)
- 3rd - Southern Miss - Smallwood 13-yard run (Davenport kick)
- 3rd - Mississippi Southern - Riley 43-yard run (Shinaut kick)

== Aftermath ==
The Texas Western went to the Sun Bowl four more times in the next 13 years. The Mississippi Southern upset Alabama the next year in a 6–4 season. They have not returned to the Sun Bowl since this game.

== Statistics ==
Statistics	Texas Western	Mississippi Southern
First downs	15	13
Yards rushing	245	166
Yards passing	158	145
Total yards	403	311
Punts-Average	5-28.0	4-28.0
Fumbles-Lost	4-2	4–3
Interceptions Thrown	0	0
Penalties-Yards	4-40	3–13
