= List of NCAA football teams by wins =

This is a list of the college football teams with the most wins in the history of NCAA College Football as measured in both total wins and winning percentage. It includes teams from the NCAA Division I-Football Bowl Subdivision (FBS), NCAA Division I-Football Championship Subdivision (FCS), NCAA Division II, and NCAA Division III.

The lists below reflect official results after vacated and forfeited games. In the case of a tie, the method used to calculate winning percentage is to award half a point towards both a win and a lost, which is the method used in the NCAA's own tabulation of team records.

== Key ==
Division I FBS programs
Division I FCS programs
Division II programs
Division III programs

== NCAA football teams ranked by total wins ==
The following list displays the records for the football programs with the most wins in the NCAA through the week 3 of the 2026 season (9/21/2026). The last tied game in college football was in 1995, with OT rules changing for the 1996 season.

Rank	Team	Won	Lost	Tied	Pct
1	Michigan	1027	367	36	.731
2	Ohio State	992	338	53	.736
3	Alabama	988	345	43	.734
4	Notre Dame	975	341	42	.733
5	Texas	974	398	33	.705
6	Oklahoma	962	352	53	.723
7	Penn State	953	418	41	.689
7	Yale	953	396	55	.698
9	Nebraska	934	436	40	.677
10	Harvard	919	415	50	.682
11	Georgia	907	434	54	.670
12	USC	895	378	54	.695
13	Penn	889	523	42	.626
14	Tennessee	886	422	53	.670
15	Mount Union	880	401	38	.682
16	Princeton	868	436	50	.660
17	LSU	824	445	47	.644
18	Clemson	817	483	45	.624
19	North Dakota State	815	385	34	.674
20	Auburn	811	486	47	.621
21	Wittenberg	809	387	31	.672
22	Washington & Jefferson	799	409	40	.656
22	Texas A&M	799	512	48	.606
24	West Virginia	794	541	45	.592
25	Washington	793	477	50	.620
26	Virginia Tech	784	521	46	.597
27	Pittsburgh	779	571	42	.575
28	Florida	773	458	40	.624
28	Georgia Tech	773	552	43	.581
30	Pittsburg State	768	374	47	.666
31	Navy	760	606	57	.554
32	Syracuse	757	591	49	.559
33	Wisconsin	753	534	53	.582
34	Minnesota	751	554	44	.573
35	Arkansas	750	557	40	.572
36	Delaware	748	492	43	.600
36	Dartmouth	748	476	46	.607
38	Army	747	554	51	.571
39	Miami (OH)	741	498	44	.595
39	North Carolina	741	585	54	.557
41	Utah	738	491	31	.598
41	Widener	738	460	39	.612
43	Colorado	737	558	36	.567
43	Wabash	737	406	56	.638
45	Oregon	733	515	46	.584
46	Missouri	732	598	52	.548
46	Lehigh	732	645	45	.531
48	Michigan State	727	503	44	.588
49	Tuskegee	724	405	49	.635
50	Dayton	721	400	25	.640
51	Lafayette	715	652	39	.522
52	Iowa	709	585	39	.547
53	Northern Iowa	708	466	47	.599
54	California	707	583	51	.546
55	TCU	705	583	57	.545
55	Boston College	705	542	37	.563
57	St. John's (MN)	704	260	24	.725
58	Ole Miss	702	552	35	.558
59	Virginia	701	653	48	.517
60	North Dakota	697	447	30	.606
61	Miami (FL)	689	394	19	.634
62	Maryland	687	641	43	.517
63	Colgate	684	535	50	.559
64	Rutgers	683	711	42	.490
64	Villanova	683	512	41	.569
66	Williams	682	407	47	.621
67	South Dakota State	681	486	36	.581
67	Franklin & Marshall	681	517	47	.566
69	Holy Cross	680	563	55	.545
70	Central (IA)	678	341	26	.661
70	Hillsdale	678	467	46	.589
70	Stanford	678	515	49	.566
73	Appalachian State	677	368	28	.641
74	Carson–Newman	676 (Note: The official NCAA records does not list Carson-Newman's 2025 win over South Carolina Central Christian University, it is included for the purposes of this list.)	367	31	.644
75	Cincinnati	674	620	50	.520
76	Central Oklahoma	671	448	47	.596
77	Amherst	670	447	54	.595
78	Westminster (PA)	669	458	54	.589
79	Albion	667	438	43	.600
80	Cornell	666	569	34	.538
81	Linfield	664	269	30	.705
81	St. Thomas (MN)	664	369	32	.638
83	Wisconsin–Whitewater	663	273	21	.704
84	Coe	662	420	37	.608
84	Fresno State	662	458	27	.589
84	Montana	662	523	26	.557
87	Central Michigan	660	465	36	.584
88	Drake	658	553	29	.542
88	Centre	658	445	37	.593
90	Tulsa	657	551	27	.543
90	Furman	656	512	38	.560
92	Louisiana Tech	654 (Note: The official NCAA records incorrectly list LA Tech's 1951 seasons as 5-4, when it was in fact 4-5.)	511	37	.559
93	Kentucky	654	663	44	.497
93	NC State	653	613	55	.515
95	Illinois	653	633	50	.507
96	South Carolina	650	625	44	.509
97	Arizona State	649	433	24	.598
98	Arizona	648	512	33	.557
99	UCLA	648	462	37	.581
100	Northwest Missouri State	645	419	32	.603
100	Eastern Kentucky	645	427	38	.598
100	Purdue	645	620	48	.510
100	Marshall	645	582	47	.525

== Teams ranked by winning percentage ==
The following list displays the records for the Top 25 NCAA football programs ranked by winning percentage, with a minimum of 20 seasons played, through the week 3 of the 2026 regular season (9/21/2026).

Rank	Team	Won	Lost	Tied	Pct
1	Mary Hardin–Baylor	266	53	0	.834
2	Grand Valley State	461	153	3	.750
3	Ohio State	992	338	53	.736
4	Alabama	988	345	43	.734
5	Notre Dame	975	341	42	.733
5	Michigan	1027	367	36	.731
7	St. John's (MN)	704	260	24	.725
8	Boise State	513	195	2	.724
9	Oklahoma	962	352	53	.723
10	Valdosta State	355	143	3	.712
11	Linfield	664	269	30	.705
11	Texas	974	398	33	.705
13	Wisconsin–Whitewater	663	273	21	.704
14	Yale	953	396	55	.698
15	USC	895	378	54	.695
16	Penn State	953	418	41	.689
17	Huntingdon	151	70	0	.683
18	Harvard	919	415	50	.682
18	Mount Union	880	401	38	.682
20	Indiana (PA)	618	289	23	.677
20	Nebraska	934	436	40	.677
22	West Chester	643	304	17	.676
23	North Dakota State	815	385	34	.674
24	Wittenberg	809	387	31	.672
25	Tennessee	886	422	53	.670
25	Grambling State	601	292	15	.670
25	Bentley	254	125	1	.670
25	Georgia	907	434	54	.670

== See also ==
- NCAA Division I FBS football win–loss records
- NCAA Division I FCS football win–loss records
- List of teams with the most victories in NCAA Division I men's college basketball
