= NCAA Division I football win–loss records in the 1920s =

The following list shows NCAA Division I football programs by winning percentage during the 1920–1929 football seasons. During this time the NCAA did not have any formal divisions. The following list reflects the records according to the NCAA. This list takes into account results modified later due to NCAA action, such as vacated victories and forfeits.

NCAA Division I Football Records in the 1920s
Team	Total games	Won	Lost	Tie	Pct.
USC	101	87	12	2	.871
Notre Dame	97	83	11	3	.871
Detroit Mercy (Note: Detroit Mercy joined Division I in 1927.)	27	23	3	1	.870
California	95	73	15	7	.805
Georgetown (Note: Georgetown joined Division I in 1927.)	28	21	5	2	.786
Vanderbilt	92	68	17	7	.777
Tennessee	92	68	18	6	.772
Michigan	78	58	16	4	.769
Dartmouth	86	65	19	2	.767
Boston College	86	63	17	6	.767
NYU (Note: NYU joined Division I in 1927.)	30	22	6	2	.767
Cornell	79	58	16	5	.766
Army	95	69	19	7	.763
Furman (Note: Furman left Division I after the 1928 season.)	92	69	21	2	.761
Lafayette	88	64	18	6	.761
Alabama	99	72	21	6	.758
Texas	89	64	18	7	.758
Pittsburgh	92	65	19	8	.750
Centre (Note: Centre left Division I after the 1925 season.)	56	41	13	2	.750
Stanford	96	68	22	6	.740
Syracuse	94	65	21	8	.734
Illinois	77	55	19	3	.734
Washington & Jefferson	93	62	19	12	.731
Yale	83	58	20	5	.729
Nebraska	82	55	18	9	.726
Princeton	72	48	16	8	.722
Colorado State	80	55	20	5	.719
Penn	94	65	25	4	.713
Georgia Tech	92	62	23	7	.712
Tulsa	91	62	24	5	.709
West Virginia	97	63	24	10	.701
Missouri	82	54	21	7	.701
Florida	96	63	25	8	.698
Texas A&M	91	59	23	9	.698
Gonzaga (Note: Gonzaga played in Division I during the 1922–1925 seasons.)	33	21	8	4	.697
Iowa	77	52	22	3	.695
Navy	85	55	22	8	.694
VMI	96	65	28	3	.693
Washington	97	64	27	6	.691
Arizona	76	50	21	5	.691
Colorado	80	52	22	6	.688
SMU	94	56	22	16	.681
Utah	72	46	20	6	.681
TCU	95	59	26	10	.674
Fordham (Note: Fordham joined Division I in 1928.)	18	11	5	2	.667
William & Mary (Note: William & Mary joined Division I in 1924.)	80	51	25	4	.663
Penn State	94	57	27	10	.660
Arkansas	90	56	28	6	.656
Georgia	95	60	31	4	.653
Tulane	92	57	29	6	.652
Carnegie Mellon (Note: Carnegie Mellon joined Division I in 1922.)	70	43	22	5	.650
Utah State	77	47	24	6	.649
Wisconsin	78	46	23	9	.647
Bucknell	99	60	31	8	.646
Harvard	84	51	27	6	.643
Colorado College	78	48	26	4	.641
Colgate	90	52	27	11	.639
Brown	95	58	32	5	.637
Virginia Tech	94	56	31	7	.633
New Mexico State	79	47	26	6	.633
Baylor	99	58	33	8	.626
Marquette (Note: Marquette joined Division I in 1927.)	26	15	9	2	.615
North Carolina	93	54	33	6	.613
Villanova	84	46	27	11	.613
Minnesota	76	43	26	7	.612
Drake	81	48	30	3	.611
Ohio State	78	44	27	7	.609
Montana State (Note: Montana State joined Division I in 1923.)	59	34	22	3	.602
South Carolina	96	55	37	4	.594
Oregon	82	42	28	12	.585
Denver	77	42	29	6	.584
Washington State	80	43	30	7	.581
Mississippi College (Note: Mississippi College left Division I after the 1924 season.)	43	23	16	4	.581
LSU	90	49	35	6	.578
Temple (Note: Temple did not field a team during the 1920 & 1921 seasons due to World War I.)	61	32	23	6	.574
Oregon State	83	44	32	7	.572
New Mexico	70	37	27	6	.571
Lehigh (Note: Lehigh left Division I after the 1923 season.)	35	18	13	4	.571
Chicago	80	43	32	5	.569
Virginia	91	46	35	10	.560
Texas Tech (Note: Texas Tech's first season was in 1925.)	47	22	17	8	.553
Columbia	89	46	37	6	.551
Oklahoma	79	38	30	11	.551
Arizona State (Note: Arizona State did not field a team during the 1920 & 1921 seasons.)	50	25	20	5	.550
Duke (Note: Duke restarted football for the 1920 season.)	89	46	39	4	.539
Washington & Lee	92	46	39	7	.538
Kansas State	81	39	33	9	.537
Purdue	76	38	33	5	.533
Maryland	96	46	40	10	.531
Kentucky	87	42	37	8	.529
Citadel	93	46	41	6	.527
Idaho (Note: Idaho joined Division I in 1922.)	73	34	31	8	.521
UTEP	70	33	30	7	.521
Northwestern	78	40	37	1	.519
Rutgers (Note: Rutgers left Division after the 1923 season.)	36	18	17	1	.514
Mississippi State	85	38	37	10	.506
Oglethorpe (Note: Oglethorpe left Division I after the 1925 season.)	60	29	29	2	.500
Presbyterian (Note: Presbyterian left Division after the 1926 season.)	58	27	27	4	.500
Spring Hill (Note: Spring Hill joined Division I for the 1921 & 1922 seasons.)	16	8	8	0	.500
Fort Benning (Note: Fort Benning played Division I during the 1922 season.)	10	5	5	0	.500
Davidson	99	44	45	10	.495
Creighton (Note: Creighton joined Division I in 1927.)	25	11	12	2	.480
Auburn	90	40	43	7	.483
Birmingham–Southern (Note: Birmingham–Southern left Division I after the 1922 season.)	25	11	12	2	.480
Phillips (Note: Phillips joined Division for the 1920 & 1921 seasons.)	19	7	8	4	.474
Clemson	93	41	47	5	.468
Kansas	79	32	37	10	.468
Wake Forest	98	41	48	9	.464
Ole Miss	91	40	47	4	.462
Grinnell	76	31	37	8	.461
Miami (FL) (Note: Miami (FL) played their first season in 1927.)	24	10	12	2	.458
Richmond (Note: Richmond joined Division I for the 1921–1925 seasons.)	43	18	22	3	.453
Iowa State	80	33	41	6	.450
North Carolina State	97	40	50	7	.448
Michigan State	85	36	45	4	.447
Montana (Note: Montana joined Division I in 1923.)	59	24	31	4	.441
Sewanee	87	35	46	6	.437
Indiana	77	31	41	5	.435
Chattanooga (Note: Chattanooga left Division I after the 1925 season.)	45	17	23	5	.433
Newberry (Note: Newberry left Division I after the 1925 season.)	50	21	28	1	.430
UCLA	74	28	39	7	.426
Mercer	92	36	50	6	.424
Rice	86	33	47	6	.419
Northern Colorado (Note: Northern Colorado joined Division I in 1923.)	56	22	32	2	.411
Oklahoma State	87	31	47	9	.408
Washington (MO)	80	29	44	7	.406
BYU (Note: BYU joined Division I in 1922.)	54	19	31	4	.389
Millsaps (Note: Millsaps joined Division I during the 1924 season.)	9	3	5	1	.389
Samford (Note: Samford left Division I after the 1924 season.)	47	14	26	7	.372
Wyoming	85	23	57	5	.300
Colorado Mines	72	20	50	2	.292
Wofford (Note: Wofford left Division I after the 1926 season.)	66	18	47	1	.280
Erskine (Note: Erskine joined Division I for the 1921, 1922 & 1924 seasons.)	23	6	17	0	.261
Western State (CO) (Note: Western State joined Division I in 1924.)	42	8	34	0	.190
Regis (CO) (Note: Regis (CO) joined Division I during the 1924 & 1929 season.)	16	3	13	0	.188
Whitman (Note: Whitman joined Division I for the 1923 & 1924 seasons.)	12	2	10	0	.167
Southwestern (TX) (Note: Southwestern (TX) left Division I after the 1921 season.)	15	1	12	2	.133

Chart notes

== See also ==
- NCAA Division I FBS football win–loss records
- NCAA Division I football win–loss records in the 1910s
- NCAA Division I football win–loss records in the 1930s
