= NCAA Division I football win–loss records in the 1950s =

The following list shows NCAA Division I football programs by winning percentage during the 1950–1959 football seasons. During this time Division I was known as the University Division. The following list reflects the records according to the NCAA. This list takes into account results modified later due to NCAA action, such as vacated victories and forfeits.

NCAA Division I Football Records in the 1950s
Team	Total games	Won	Lost	Tie	Pct.
Oklahoma	105	93	10	2	.895
San Francisco (Note: San Francisco left Division I after the 1951 season.)	20	16	4	0	.800
Ole Miss	106	80	21	5	.778
Michigan State	92	70	21	1	.766
Princeton	90	67	22	1	.750
Arizona State	102	74	25	3	.740
Georgia Tech	111	79	26	6	.739
Wyoming	101	72	24	5	.738
UCLA	97	68	26	3	.716
Ohio State	92	63	24	5	.712
Tennessee	107	72	31	4	.692
Penn State	94	62	28	4	.681
Maryland	101	67	31	3	.678
Syracuse	93	62	29	2	.677
Army	90	58	27	5	.672
Notre Dame	99	64	31	4	.667
Clemson	101	64	32	5	.658
Wisconsin	92	57	28	7	.658
Colorado	100	62	33	5	.645
Duke	102	62	33	7	.642
Air Force (Note: Air Force joined Division I in 1956.)	40	23	12	5	.638
Navy	94	55	30	9	.633
Yale	90	54	30	6	.633
Auburn	103	63	37	3	.626
Texas	104	64	38	2	.625
Miami (FL)	100	60	37	3	.615
Kentucky	105	62	38	5	.614
Loyola Marymount (Note: Loyola Marymount dropped football after the 1951 season.)	18	11	7	0	.611
USC	102	60	38	4	.608
West Virginia	98	58	38	2	.602
Holy Cross	97	56	38	3	.593
North Texas (Note: North Texas joined Division I in 1953.)	71	40	27	4	.592
TCU	105	60	41	4	.590
Michigan	91	52	36	3	.588
Pacific	100	55	38	7	.585
Houston (Note: Houston joined Division I in 1951.)	87	49	35	3	.580
UTEP	101	57	41	3	.579
Baylor	103	57	42	4	.573
Iowa	92	49	36	7	.571
South Carolina	97	54	41	2	.567
Boston College	91	49	38	4	.560
Illinois	91	48	37	6	.560
LSU	106	55	43	8	.557
Florida	101	53	42	6	.554
Cincinnati (Note: Cincinnati joined Division I in 1954.)	58	29	23	6	.552
VMI	100	52	42	6	.550
Utah	102	54	44	4	.549
Tulsa	104	54	46	4	.538
Florida State (Note: Florida State joined Division I in 1954.)	63	33	29	1	.532
Texas A&M	102	51	45	6	.529
Vanderbilt	102	49	44	9	.525
Purdue	90	42	38	10	.522
Rice	102	51	48	3	.515
Stanford	101	50	47	4	.515
Washington & Lee (Note: Washington & Lee left Division I after the 1953 season.)	41	21	20	0	.512
Georgia	105	51	49	5	.510
Colorado State	98	49	47	2	.510
Alabama	108	50	48	10	.509
Washington	101	49	48	4	.505
Virginia Tech	100	48	48	4	.500
Mississippi State	94	45	45	4	.500
Cornell	90	44	44	2	.500
Boston University	88	42	42	4	.500
Arkansas	102	50	51	1	.495
SMU	100	47	48	5	.495
California	102	48	50	4	.490
Washington State	99	46	48	5	.490
Rutgers	87	42	44	1	.489
Denver	102	48	51	3	.485
Oklahoma State	102	47	50	5	.485
Pittsburgh	98	46	49	3	.485
Texas Tech	106	49	53	4	.481
Hardin–Simmons	104	49	53	2	.481
New Mexico	99	47	51	1	.480
Wichita State	98	44	48	6	.480
Dartmouth	90	41	45	4	.478
Fordham (Note: Fordham left Division I after the 1954 season.)	44	20	22	2	.477
Drake (Note: Drake left Division I after the 1958 season.)	79	37	41	1	.475
Detroit Mercy	96	44	49	3	.474
Bradley (Note: Bradley left Division I after the 1951 season.)	19	9	10	0	.474
San Jose State	97	43	49	5	.469
Colgate	89	39	46	4	.461
Harvard	84	37	44	3	.458
Oregon	101	44	53	4	.455
Oregon State	96	43	52	1	.453
Arizona	101	44	54	3	.450
Kansas	100	43	53	4	.450
Temple (Note: Temple left Division I after the 1952 season.)	29	12	15	2	.448
George Washington	90	38	48	4	.444
Missouri	101	42	54	5	.441
Citadel	96	40	53	3	.432
Wake Forest	99	38	52	9	.429
Penn	90	36	50	4	.422
Minnesota	90	34	49	7	.417
Utah State	103	40	60	3	.403
West Texas A&M	97	38	57	2	.402
Nebraska	100	38	58	4	.400
Xavier (Note: Xavier joined Division I in 1959.)	10	4	6	0	.400
Villanova	94	37	56	1	.399
Tulane	99	36	56	7	.399
Brown	90	34	53	3	.394
William & Mary	98	35	57	6	.388
Dayton (Note: Dayton joined Division I in 1956.)	40	15	24	1	.388
Northwestern	90	33	54	3	.383
Richmond	97	35	58	4	.381
Virginia	97	36	60	1	.376
Davidson	89	33	55	1	.376
BYU	99	34	59	6	.374
Iowa State	95	33	58	4	.368
Furman	99	34	62	3	.359
North Carolina	98	33	61	4	.357
North Carolina State	100	31	64	5	.335
Idaho	91	29	59	3	.335
Kansas State	100	31	65	4	.330
Marquette	96	28	61	7	.328
Santa Clara (Note: Santa Clara left Division I after the 1952 season.)	28	8	18	2	.321
Indiana	90	26	61	3	.306
Duquesne (Note: Duquesne left Division I after the 1950 season.)	9	2	6	1	.278
Columbia	89	24	64	1	.275
New Mexico State	97	26	70	1	.273
Northern Arizona (Note: Northern Arizona left Division I after the 1953 season.)	24	6	18	0	.250
Saint Mary's (Note: Saint Mary's left Division I after the 1950 season.)	10	2	7	1	.250
Montana	94	22	71	1	.239
Georgetown (Note: Georgetown dropped football after the 1950 season.)	9	2	7	0	.222
NYU (Note: NYU dropped football after the 1952 season.)	23	4	17	2	.217
Nevada (Note: Nevada left Division I after the 1950 season.)	10	1	9	0	.100

Chart notes

== See also ==
- NCAA Division I FBS football win–loss records
- NCAA Division I football win–loss records in the 1940s
- NCAA Division I football win–loss records in the 1960s
