= NCAA Division I football win–loss records in the 1930s =

The following list shows NCAA Division I football programs by winning percentage during the 1930–1939 football seasons. During this time the NCAA did not have any formal divisions. The following list reflects the records according to the NCAA. This list takes into account results modified later due to NCAA action, such as vacated victories and forfeits.

NCAA Division I Football Records in the 1930s
Team	Total games	Won	Lost	Tie	Pct.
Alabama	95	79	11	5	.858
Holy Cross (Note: Holy Cross joined Division I in 1936.)	37	30	5	2	.838
Hardin–Simmons (Note: Hardin–Simmons joined Division I in 1939.)	9	7	1	1	.833
Pittsburgh	96	75	14	7	.818
Tennessee	101	79	17	5	.807
Duke	99	77	17	5	.803
Fordham	84	61	14	9	.780
TCU	116	84	24	8	.759
Notre Dame	91	66	20	5	.753
Tulane	101	73	22	6	.752
Army	98	71	22	5	.750
Ohio State	81	57	19	5	.735
Minnesota	82	57	19	6	.732
Utah	85	59	20	6	.729
Santa Clara (Note: Santa Clara joined Division I in 1932.)	72	50	17	5	.729
Nebraska	91	62	21	8	.725
Michigan State	87	59	20	8	.724
USC	106	72	25	9	.722
Villanova	92	62	22	8	.717
Purdue	82	54	20	8	.707
Dartmouth	90	60	23	7	.706
LSU	102	68	27	7	.701
Duquesne	100	67	28	5	.695
Saint Mary's (Note: St. Mary's joined Division I in 1930.)	91	59	24	8	.692
Colgate	87	57	25	2	.690
Detroit Mercy	95	63	27	5	.689
North Carolina	95	60	24	11	.689
Texas Tech	103	67	31	5	.675
Boston College	93	59	27	7	.672
California	107	69	33	5	.668
Regis (CO) (Note: Regis (CO) left Division I in 1930.)	9	6	3	0	.667
Michigan	83	53	26	4	.663
Colorado	81	51	26	4	.654
Centenary (LA) (Note: Centenary (LA) joined Division I in 1930.)	111	66	33	12	.649
George Washington (Note: George Washington joined Division I in 1932.)	71	43	23	5	.641
Tulsa	93	55	29	9	.640
Richmond (Note: Richmond joined Division I in 1933.)	75	42	22	11	.633
Princeton	80	47	26	7	.631
Stanford	100	57	32	11	.625
Bucknell	89	51	29	9	.624
Temple	95	53	30	12	.621
Arizona	92	54	32	6	.620
Washington	92	53	31	8	.620
Georgia	101	59	35	7	.619
Cornell	76	45	27	4	.618
SMU	111	64	38	9	.617
Furman (Note: Furman joined Division I in 1933.)	64	37	22	5	.617
Columbia	87	50	30	7	.615
Vanderbilt	94	54	33	7	.612
Yale	81	45	27	9	.611
UTEP	90	52	33	5	.606
Syracuse	83	46	29	8	.602
UCLA	98	54	35	9	.597
Marquette	85	49	33	3	.594
NYU	86	49	33	4	.593
New Mexico State	92	51	34	7	.592
Washington State	93	51	34	8	.591
Oregon	94	53	36	5	.590
BYU	89	49	33	7	.590
Denver	92	51	35	6	.587
Baylor	99	56	39	4	.586
Oklahoma	94	49	33	12	.585
Utah State	80	43	30	7	.581
Manhattan (Note: Manhattan joined Division I in 1936.)	37	21	15	1	.581
Northwestern	81	43	30	8	.580
Oregon State	101	53	37	11	.579
Kansas State	90	48	34	8	.578
Miami (FL)	92	49	35	8	.576
Auburn	102	54	39	9	.574
Clemson	95	51	37	7	.574
Saint Louis (Note: Saint Louis joined Division I in 1932.)	75	39	28	8	.573
Penn	81	43	33	5	.562
Texas A&M	101	52	40	9	.559
Ole Miss	104	54	42	8	.558
Harvard	81	43	34	4	.556
Maryland	103	55	45	3	.549
Georgetown	86	43	35	8	.547
New Mexico	90	47	39	4	.544
Navy	94	48	40	6	.543
Loyola Marymount (Note: Loyola Marymount joined Division I in 1933.)	69	36	30	3	.543
Rice	109	57	48	4	.541
Virginia Tech	95	46	39	10	.537
Northern Colorado (Note: Northern Colorado left Division I after the 1937 season.)	59	29	25	5	.534
Drake	99	49	44	6	.525
Kentucky	93	47	43	3	.522
Washington & Jefferson (Note: Washington & Jefferson left Division I after the 1934 season.)	47	23	21	3	.521
Oklahoma State	102	49	46	7	.515
Texas	97	47	44	6	.515
Washington (MO)	94	46	44	4	.511
Brown	90	45	43	2	.511
West Virginia	99	46	45	8	.505
South Carolina	105	49	49	7	.500
Illinois	82	38	39	5	.494
Mississippi State	97	46	48	3	.490
Mercer	94	43	46	5	.484
Arkansas	98	42	46	10	.480
Lafayette	86	40	44	2	.477
Davidson	94	41	46	7	.473
Carnegie Mellon	86	37	42	7	.471
San Francisco (Note: San Francisco joined Division I in 1932.)	69	28	32	9	.471
Wisconsin	83	36	41	6	.470
Gonzaga	88	38	44	6	.466
Citadel	99	43	50	6	.465
Kansas	89	37	44	8	.461
Arizona State	87	37	44	6	.460
William & Mary	97	41	49	7	.459
Penn State	81	34	41	6	.457
Colorado State	84	34	42	8	.452
Montana	82	35	43	4	.451
Florida	101	42	52	7	.450
Georgia Tech	100	41	51	8	.450
Colorado College (Note: Colorado College left Division I after the 1937 season.)	64	26	33	5	.445
Erskine (Note: Erskine joined Division I for the 1936 season.)	9	4	5	0	.444
Wake Forest	88	36	47	5	.438
Washington & Lee	93	37	49	7	.435
Iowa State	87	33	45	9	.431
Indiana	80	28	40	12	.425
Creighton	85	34	47	4	.424
Northern Arizona (Note: Northern Arizona joined Division I in 1931.)	72	26	37	9	.424
VMI	99	36	55	8	.404
Idaho	87	34	51	2	.402
Iowa	80	28	45	7	.394
Missouri	93	32	52	9	.392
Rhodes (Note: Rhodes joined Division I for the 1939 season.)	9	3	5	1	.389
Montana State (Note: Montana State left Division I after the 1937 season.)	62	22	36	4	.387
North Carolina State	96	33	55	8	.385
Washburn (Note: Washburn joined Division I in 1935.)	48	18	29	1	.385
Loyola (LA) (Note: Loyola (LA) joined Division I for the 1934–1936 seasons.)	28	10	17	1	.375
Virginia	94	29	56	9	.356
Grinnell (Note: Grinnell left Division I after the 1936 season.)	61	20	38	3	.352
Chicago (Note: Chicago dropped football after the 1939 season.)	81	24	49	8	.346
Wyoming	84	26	52	6	.345
Sewanee	70	24	62	4	.289
Presbyterian (Note: Presbyterian joined Division I during the 1935 & 1936 seasons)	18	5	13	0	.278
Western State (CO) (Note: Western State left Division I after the 1937 season.)	53	11	42	0	.208
Colorado Mines (Note: Colorado Mines left Division I after the 1937 season.)	56	10	45	1	.188

Chart notes

== See also ==
- NCAA Division I FBS football win–loss records
- NCAA Division I football win–loss records in the 1920s
- NCAA Division I football win–loss records in the 1940s
