= NCAA Division I football win–loss records in the 1940s =

The following list shows NCAA Division I football programs by winning percentage during the 1940–1949 football seasons. During World War II, numerous teams took seasons off and many military teams competed in the NCAA. During this time, the NCAA did not have any formal divisions. The following list reflects the records according to the NCAA. This list takes into account results modified later due to NCAA action, such as vacated victories and forfeits.

NCAA Division I Football Records in the 1940s
Team	Total games	Won	Lost	Tie	Pct.
Randolph Field (Note: Temporary military teams that competed in the NCAA during World War II.)	12	12	0	0	1.000
Naval Air Station Norman	6	6	0	0	1.000
Notre Dame	97	82	9	6	.876
Del Monte Pre-Flight	8	7	1	0	.875
Iowa Pre-Flight	31	26	5	0	.839
Georgia Pre-Flight	15	12	2	1	.833
Michigan	92	74	15	3	.821
March Field	21	16	3	2	.810
Hardin–Simmons (Note: Teams took seasons off during World War II.)	75	56	13	6	.787
Texas	102	78	21	3	.779
Rutgers (Note: Rutgers joined Division I in 1946.)	36	28	8	0	.778
Pacific (Note: Pacific joined Division I for the 1943 season.)	9	7	2	0	.778
Army	92	68	17	7	.777
Tennessee	91	67	19	5	.764
Jacksonville Naval Air Station	12	9	3	0	.750
William & Mary	89	64	20	5	.747
Penn State	87	62	20	5	.741
Georgia	109	78	27	4	.734
Great Lakes Navy	47	33	11	3	.734
Nevada (Note: Nevada joined Division I in 1946.)	41	30	11	0	.732
Alabama	93	66	23	4	.731
Fort Riley	9	6	2	1	.722
Penn	82	57	21	4	.720
Oklahoma	100	69	27	4	.710
Boston University (Note: Boston University joined Division I in 1947.)	24	17	7	0	.708
Second Air Force	15	10	4	1	.700
Minnesota	88	60	27	1	.688
Mississippi State	86	57	25	4	.686
Boston College	80	53	25	3	.673
Tulsa	101	66	32	3	.668
Duke	72	59	28	5	.668
Ohio State	90	57	27	6	.667
Santa Clara	63	40	19	4	.667
Georgia Tech	104	68	36	0	.654
Detroit Mercy	74	48	26	0	.649
North Carolina Pre-Flight	27	16	8	3	.648
Utah	90	54	30	6	.633
Alameda Coast Guard	15	8	4	3	.633
Michigan State	80	47	26	7	.631
Cornell	89	55	32	2	.629
Rice	104	63	37	4	.625
Amarillo Field	8	5	3	0	.625
Virginia	90	53	31	6	.622
USC	99	57	33	9	.621
Missouri	101	60	37	4	.614
Oregon State	79	45	27	7	.614
LSU	97	57	35	5	.613
Wake Forest	96	57	36	3	.609
Villanova	89	53	34	2	.607
North Carolina	100	58	37	5	.605
Colorado College (Note: Colorado College joined Division I during the 1943–1945 seasons.)	24	14	9	1	.604
Texas Tech	107	61	42	4	.589
West Texas A&M (Note: West Texas A&M joined Division I in 1941.)	68	40	28	0	.588
Arizona	75	42	29	4	.587
Creighton (Note: Creighton dropped football after the 1942 season.)	29	16	11	2	.586
Oklahoma State	95	53	37	5	.584
UTEP	68	37	26	5	.581
Brown	87	48	34	5	.580
Stanford	69	39	28	2	.580
SMU	103	55	40	8	.573
Georgetown	62	34	25	3	.573
Vanderbilt	79	44	33	2	.570
Clemson	94	51	38	5	.569
Miami (FL)	88	48	37	3	.563
California	101	55	43	3	.559
Colorado State	71	37	29	5	.556
Lubbock Field	9	5	4	0	.556
Ole Miss	85	46	37	2	.553
Fort Warren	10	5	4	1	.550
Colorado	87	46	38	3	.546
Kentucky	91	47	39	5	.544
Lafayette (Note: Lafayette left Division I after the 1946 season.)	57	30	25	2	.544
Yale	85	45	38	2	.541
Saint Mary's Pre-Flight	26	13	11	2	.538
Holy Cross	96	47	41	8	.531
Dartmouth	84	43	38	3	.530
Wichita State (Note: Wichita State joined Division I in 1945.)	51	26	23	2	.529
Duquesne	44	28	25	1	.528
Indiana	92	46	42	4	.522
Navy	90	44	40	6	.522
West Virginia	93	48	44	4	.521
Tulane	89	44	41	4	.517
Denver	95	44	41	10	.516
Texas A&M	102	50	47	5	.515
Oregon	76	38	36	2	.513
Fordham	59	29	28	2	.508
Saint Mary's	81	40	39	2	.506
Washington	83	40	39	4	.506
TCU	101	47	47	7	.500
Maryland	94	44	44	6	.500
Bradley (Note: Bradley joined Division I in 1949.)	10	5	5	0	.500
Baylor	82	38	39	5	.494
Arizona State	70	32	33	5	.493
Harvard	68	31	32	5	.493
Northwestern	89	42	44	3	.489
Drake	85	39	41	5	.488
Loyola Marymount	40	19	20	1	.488
UCLA	99	47	50	2	.485
Kansas	99	45	48	6	.485
Bucknell (Note: Bucknell joined Division I during the 1944–1946 seasons.)	26	12	13	1	.481
Washington State	76	33	36	7	.480
North Carolina State	97	43	48	6	.474
Columbia	87	40	45	2	.471
Temple	87	36	42	9	.466
Utah State	81	36	42	3	.463
Montana	65	29	34	2	.462
South Carolina	87	36	43	8	.460
Princeton	72	31	37	4	.458
Purdue	90	40	48	2	.456
San Francisco	74	33	40	1	.453
Wisconsin	90	38	47	5	.450
Iowa State	88	37	46	5	.449
Richmond	92	38	48	6	.446
Illinois	93	38	49	5	.440
VMI	92	38	49	5	.440
Colgate	83	33	43	7	.440
Citadel	58	25	32	1	.440
Arkansas	102	42	56	4	.431
Washington (MO) (Note: Washington (MO) left Division I after the 1942 season.)	65	12	16	0	.429
Auburn	88	34	47	7	.426
Gonzaga (Note: Gonzaga dropped football after the 1941 season.)	20	8	11	1	.425
New Mexico	89	34	48	7	.421
Marquette	90	36	51	3	.417
Virginia Tech	76	28	41	7	.414
Syracuse	75	29	43	3	.407
Pittsburgh	89	35	52	2	.404
Saint Louis (Note: Saint Louis dropped football after the 1949 season.)	78	30	45	3	.404
Florida	86	33	50	3	.401
Washburn (Note: Washburn left Division I after the 1940 season.)	10	4	6	0	.400
Wyoming	65	24	38	3	.392
Iowa	87	33	52	2	.391
Davidson	67	23	38	6	.388
Coast Guard	17	6	10	1	.382
George Washington	62	22	37	3	.379
Carnegie Mellon (Note: Carnegie Mellon left Division I after the 1940 season.)	8	3	5	0	.375
Nebraska	91	34	57	0	.374
Merchant Marines	30	11	19	0	.367
Manhattan (Note: Manhattan dropped football after the 1942 season.)	26	9	16	1	.365
BYU	66	21	40	5	.356
NYU	66	22	43	1	.341
Furman	64	20	41	3	.336
Sewanee (Note: Sewanee left Division I after the 1941 season.)	15	5	10	0	.333
Northern Arizona	56	17	36	3	.330
New Mexico State	66	21	45	0	.318
Washington & Lee	65	18	43	4	.308
Camp Grant	10	2	6	2	.300
Idaho	70	20	49	1	.293
Presbyterian (Note: Presbyterian joined Division I for the 1944–1945 seasons.)	16	4	12	0	.250
Mercer (Note: Mercer dropped football after the 1941 season.)	17	4	13	0	.235
Centenary (LA) (Note: Centenary (LA) dropped football after the 1941 season.)	20	3	15	2	.200
Portland (Note: Portland joined Division I for the 1946–1947 seasons.)	19	3	15	1	.184
Kansas State	93	14	75	4	.172

Chart notes

== See also ==
- NCAA Division I FBS football win–loss records
- NCAA Division I football win–loss records in the 1930s
- NCAA Division I football win–loss records in the 1950s
