= NCAA Division I-A football win–loss records in the 1980s =

The following list shows NCAA Division I-A football programs by winning percentage during the 1980-1989 football seasons. The following list reflects the records according to the NCAA. This list takes into account results modified later due to NCAA action, such as vacated victories and forfeits. This list only takes into account games played while in Division I-A.

NCAA Division I-A Football Records in the 1980s
Team	Total games	Won	Lost	Tie	Pct.
Tennessee State (Note: Tennessee State left Division I-A after the 1980 season.)	10	9	1	0	.900
Yale (Note: The Ivy League, Southern Conference, and Southland Conference moved from Division I-A to I-AA after the 1981 season.)	20	17	3	0	.850
Nebraska	123	103	20	0	.837
Miami (FL)	118	98	20	0	.831
BYU	128	102	26	0	.797
Furman	22	17	4	1	.795
Oklahoma	118	91	25	2	.780
Clemson	115	86	25	4	.765
Penn State	118	89	27	2	.763
McNeese State	23	17	5	1	.761
Georgia	119	88	27	4	.756
Michigan	120	89	29	2	.750
Florida State	118	87	28	3	.750
Auburn	118	86	31	1	.733
Alabama	119	85	32	2	.723
Arkansas	119	85	32	2	.723
UCLA	117	81	30	6	.718
Washington	117	83	33	1	.714
Chattanooga	22	15	6	1	.705
Fresno State	115	80	34	1	.700
Ohio State	119	82	35	2	.697
SMU	92	63	28	1	.690
USC	116	78	35	3	.685
Tennessee	119	77	37	5	.668
Florida	116	76	37	3	.668
Arizona State	113	73	36	4	.664
West Virginia	118	77	39	2	.661
Pittsburgh	116	74	37	5	.659
Citadel	22	14	7	1	.659
Notre Dame	117	76	39	2	.658
Iowa	121	77	40	4	.653
Central Michigan	108	67	37	4	.639
Texas	117	73	42	2	.632
LSU	116	70	41	5	.625
Colgate	20	12	7	1	.625
Harvard	20	12	7	1	.625
Southern Miss	113	70	42	1	.624
Arizona	113	67	40	6	.619
Texas A&M	116	71	44	1	.616
Oklahoma State	116	70	43	3	.616
Hawaii	116	69	43	4	.612
Air Force	122	72	48	2	.598
San Jose State	114	67	46	1	.592
Baylor	114	66	46	2	.588
Virginia Tech	113	65	46	2	.584
Tulsa	111	64	47	0	.577
Princeton	20	11	8	1	.575
Syracuse	114	64	48	2	.570
Wyoming	118	67	51	0	.568
Indiana State (Note: The Missouri Valley Conference stopped supporting football after the 1985 season.)	68	38	29	1	.566
Illinois	115	63	48	4	.565
Toledo	112	62	48	2	.563
Maryland	115	63	49	3	.561
South Carolina	115	63	49	3	.561
Bowling Green	112	60	50	2	.545
Villanova (Note: Villanova left Division I-A after the 1980 season.)	11	6	5	0	.545
Boston College	115	62	52	1	.543
North Carolina	115	61	52	2	.539
Western Michigan	111	57	51	3	.527
Southern Illinois	69	36	33	0	.522
UNLV	113	58	54	1	.518
Northern Illinois	110	56	52	2	.518
Houston	114	57	54	3	.513
Louisiana-Lafayette (Note: Louisiana-Lafayette went by the name Southwestern Louisiana until 1999.)	109	54	53	2	.505
Michigan State	115	56	56	3	.500
Army	113	55	55	3	.500
Dartmouth	20	10	10	0	.500
Virginia	114	55	57	2	.491
Ball State	110	54	56	0	.491
Washington State	112	53	55	4	.491
Utah	114	54	57	3	.487
Miami (OH)	111	51	56	4	.477
VMI	21	9	10	2	.476
Cal State Fullerton	115	54	60	1	.474
Drake	66	31	35	0	.470
Akron (Note: Akron joined Division I-A in 1987.)	33	15	17	1	.470
North Carolina State	113	52	59	2	.469
Oregon	112	50	58	4	.464
Appalachian State	22	9	11	2	.455
Long Beach State	113	51	62	0	.451
Ole Miss	113	49	60	4	.451
Rutgers	109	47	58	4	.450
Brown	20	9	11	0	.450
Mississippi State	112	50	62	0	.446
Colorado	114	50	63	1	.443
Texas Tech	112	48	61	3	.442
Louisiana Tech (Note: Louisiana Tech left Division I-A after the 1981 season with the Southland Conference, and then rejoined Division I-A in 1988.)	43	18	23	2	.442
San Diego State	118	50	64	4	.441
Iowa State	110	46	60	4	.436
Kentucky	112	47	62	3	.433
Indiana	113	48	64	1	.429
Duke	111	47	63	1	.428
Wake Forest	110	46	62	2	.427
Illinois State	65	26	36	3	.423
Minnesota	112	46	64	2	.420
Missouri	113	45	64	4	.416
Purdue	112	45	65	2	.411
Holy Cross	21	9	13	0	.409
Texas-Arlington	22	9	13	0	.409
Wisconsin	114	46	67	1	.408
Stanford	111	44	65	2	.405
Georgia Tech	111	43	64	4	.405
Cornell	20	8	12	0	.400
East Carolina	110	43	66	1	.395
Navy	112	43	67	2	.393
Tulane	113	44	69	0	.389
Louisville	110	42	67	1	.386
West Texas A&M	65	24	39	2	.385
Utah State	110	41	68	1	.377
Wichita State (Note: Wichita State left Division I-A after the 1986 season.)	77	28	47	2	.377
Temple	109	41	68	0	.376
Eastern Michigan	109	38	66	5	.372
Kansas	112	38	68	6	.366
William & Mary (Note: William & Mary left Division I-A after the 1983 season.)	44	16	28	0	.364
Arkansas State	22	8	14	0	.364
East Tennessee State	22	8	14	0	.364
Cincinnati	110	38	70	2	.355
California	110	37	69	4	.355
New Mexico	116	39	76	1	.341
Lamar	22	7	14	1	.341
Western Carolina	22	7	14	1	.341
Colorado State	114	36	76	2	.325
TCU	111	34	73	4	.324
Ohio	110	34	73	3	.323
Pacific	114	35	79	0	.307
Memphis	110	31	74	5	.305
North Texas (Note: North Texas left Division I-A after the 1982 season.)	33	10	23	0	.303
Vanderbilt	111	33	77	1	.302
Kent State	110	32	78	0	.291
Richmond (Note: Richmond left Division I-A after the 1983 season.)	43	12	31	0	.279
UTEP	117	32	85	0	.274
Oregon State	111	22	85	4	.216
Rice	110	22	87	1	.205
Marshall	22	4	17	1	.205
Kansas State	111	21	87	3	.203
New Mexico State	110	21	88	1	.195
Northwestern	110	18	90	2	.173
Columbia	20	2	18	0	.100
Penn	20	2	18	0	.100

Chart notes

== See also ==
- NCAA Division I FBS football win–loss records
- NCAA Division I football win–loss records in the 1970s
- NCAA Division I-A football win–loss records in the 1990s
