= NCAA Division I FBS football win–loss records in the 2000s =

The following list shows NCAA Division I FBS/I-A football programs by winning percentage during the 2000-2009 football seasons. The following list reflects the records according to the NCAA. This list takes into account results modified later due to NCAA action, such as vacated victories and forfeits. This list only takes into account games played while in Division I-A/FBS.

NCAA Division I FBS Football Records in the 2000s
Team	Total games	Won	Lost	Pct.
Boise State	129	112	17	.868
Texas	129	110	19	.853
Oklahoma	134	110	24	.821
Ohio State	127	102	25	.803
Southern California (Note: Southern California had 14 victories vacated by the NCAA during the 2004 & 2005 seasons.)	113	88	25	.779
Florida	130	100	30	.769
TCU	124	95	29	.766
LSU	130	99	31	.762
Georgia	129	98	31	.760
Virginia Tech	131	99	32	.756
Miami (FL)	125	92	33	.736
Utah	122	86	36	.705
Oregon	125	87	38	.696
Auburn	127	88	39	.693
West Virginia	125	86	39	.688
Boston College	128	88	40	.688
Louisville	124	83	41	.669
Wisconsin	129	86	43	.667
Texas Tech	128	85	43	.664
Nebraska	128	84	44	.656
Tennessee	127	83	44	.654
Michigan	124	81	43	.653
BYU	125	81	44	.648
Iowa	125	80	45	.640
Oregon State	125	80	45	.640
South Florida	119	75	44	.630
Georgia Tech	129	81	48	.628
Clemson	126	79	47	.627
Penn State	123	77	46	.626
Florida State (Note: Florida State had 12 victories vacated by the NCAA during the 2006 & 2007 seasons.)	117	73	44	.624
Fresno State	130	81	49	.623
Cincinnati	122	78	48	.619
Hawaii	131	80	51	.611
Pittsburgh	123	74	49	.602
Toledo	122	73	49	.598
Southern Miss	126	74	52	.587
Bowling Green	121	70	51	.579
Troy	121	70	51	.579
Maryland	123	71	52	.577
Notre Dame	122	70	52	.574
California	124	71	53	.573
Arkansas	125	71	54	.568
Kansas State	125	71	54	.568
Missouri	124	70	54	.565
Northern Illinois	121	68	53	.562
Air Force	122	68	54	.557
South Carolina	122	68	54	.557
Alabama (Note: Alabama had 21 victories vacated by the NCAA between the 2005–2007 seasons.)	106	58	48	.547
Marshall	123	67	56	.545
Oklahoma State	123	67	56	.545
Purdue	124	67	57	.540
UCLA	124	67	57	.540
Arizona State	123	65	58	.528
North Carolina State	123	65	58	.528
Virginia	124	65	59	.524
Ole Miss	121	63	58	.521
Navy	123	64	59	.520
Connecticut	120	62	58	.517
Texas A&M	122	63	59	.516
Wake Forest	121	61	60	.504
Minnesota	124	62	62	.500
Northwestern	122	61	61	.500
Colorado State	123	61	62	.496
Florida Atlantic (Note: Florida Atlantic joined FBS in 2004.)	73	36	37	.493
Tulsa	126	62	64	.492
Michigan State	122	60	62	.492
Middle Tennessee	118	58	60	.492
Central Michigan	123	60	63	.488
Western Michigan	119	58	61	.487
Houston	124	60	64	.484
Miami (OH)	122	59	63	.484
Nevada	123	59	64	.480
New Mexico	123	59	64	.480
Rutgers	121	58	63	.479
East Carolina	124	59	65	.476
Kansas	120	57	63	.475
Washington State	120	57	63	.475
UCF	121	57	64	.471
Colorado	125	58	67	.464
Iowa State	123	55	68	.447
Memphis	121	53	68	.438
North Carolina	121	53	68	.438
Ball State	119	52	67	.437
Akron	118	51	67	.432
Louisiana Tech	121	52	69	.430
UAB	117	49	68	.419
Kentucky	120	50	70	.417
Ohio	120	50	70	.417
Arizona	118	49	69	.415
Washington	120	49	71	.408
Stanford	116	47	69	.405
UTEP	130	48	72	.400
Rice	118	46	72	.390
San Jose State	119	46	73	.387
Syracuse	119	46	73	.387
Illinois	118	45	73	.381
Arkansas State	118	44	74	.373
Louisiana–Lafayette	116	42	74	.362
Mississippi State	118	42	76	.356
Tulane	118	42	76	.356
Wyoming	118	42	76	.356
North Texas	120	42	78	.350
UNLV	118	41	77	.347
Kent State	116	39	77	.336
Indiana	117	39	78	.333
San Diego State	118	38	80	.322
Louisiana-Monroe	116	37	79	.319
New Mexico State	120	37	83	.308
Baylor	116	34	82	.293
Temple	117	34	83	.291
Vanderbilt	117	34	83	.291
SMU	118	34	84	.288
Utah State	115	32	83	.278
Idaho	118	31	87	.263
Buffalo	118	30	88	.254
FIU (Note: Western Kentucky joined FBS in 2008.)	59	14	45	.237
Eastern Michigan	116	27	89	.233
Army	117	25	92	.214
Duke	116	19	97	.164
Western Kentucky (Note: Florida International joined FBS in 2005.)	24	2	22	.083

Chart notes

== See also ==
- NCAA Division I FBS football win–loss records
- NCAA Division I-A football win–loss records in the 1990s
- NCAA Division I FBS football win–loss records in the 2010s
