= NCAA Division I football win–loss records in the 1910s =

The following list shows NCAA Division I football programs by winning percentage during the 1910–1919 football seasons. During this time the NCAA did not have any formal divisions. The following list reflects the records according to the NCAA. Due to the Spanish flu pandemic of 1918, many teams did not field a team during the 1918 season. This list takes into account results modified later due to NCAA action, such as vacated victories and forfeits.

NCAA Division I Football Records in the 1910s
Team	Total games	Won	Lost	Tie	Pct.
Centre (Note: Centre joined Division I in 1919.)	9	9	0	0	1.000
Mare Island (Note: Mare Island Marines was a military team that competed in 1917 & 1918 during World War I.)	19	18	1	0	.947
Washington	59	52	4	3	.907
Great Lakes Navy (Note: Great Lakes Navy was a military team that competed in 1918 during World War I.)	8	6	0	2	.875
Notre Dame	76	63	7	6	.868
Harvard	84	68	8	8	.857
Swarthmore (Note: Swarthmore joined Division I for the 1912 season.)	9	7	1	1	.833
Tulsa (Note: Did not field a team during the 1918 season due to the Spanish flu pandemic.) (Note: Tulsa joined Division I in 1914.)	20	16	3	1	.825
Texas A&M	84	67	14	3	.815
Army	77	61	14	2	.805
Pittsburgh	84	66	15	3	.804
Nebraska	77	58	13	6	.792
Georgia Tech	86	66	16	4	.791
Minnesota	69	52	13	4	.783
Texas	83	64	18	1	.777
Auburn	80	60	16	4	.775
Princeton (Note: Princeton did not field a team during the 1917 & 1918 seasons.)	66	48	12	6	.773
Washington & Lee	78	57	16	5	.763
Dartmouth	83	61	18	4	.759
Washington & Jefferson	93	68	21	4	.753
Oklahoma	91	65	20	6	.747
Vanderbilt	85	61	19	5	.747
Navy	85	60	18	7	.747
Ohio State	79	55	16	8	.747
Georgetown	78	56	18	4	.744
Illinois	71	49	15	7	.739
Michigan	76	52	18	6	.724
Arizona	51	36	14	1	.716
Virginia Tech	86	59	22	5	.715
Mississippi State	79	54	21	4	.709
Yale	74	49	18	7	.709
Penn State	82	56	22	4	.707
Virginia	71	49	20	2	.704
Colgate	67	45	18	4	.701
Rice (Note: Rice's first season was in 1912.)	58	37	15	6	.690
New Mexico State	53	35	15	3	.689
Chattanooga (Note: Chattanooga left Division I after the 1910 season.)	8	5	2	1	.688
Colorado College	68	45	20	3	.684
Georgia (Note: Georgia did not field a team in 1917 & 1918.)	70	43	18	9	.679
Rutgers (Note: Rutgers rejoined Division I in 1914, but did not play Division I during the 1915 season.)	40	25	11	4	.675
Oregon	68	44	21	3	.669
Alabama	78	50	24	4	.667
Kentucky	79	50	24	5	.665
Syracuse	97	60	29	8	.660
Penn	101	63	31	7	.658
Michigan State	73	47	24	2	.658
Presbyterian (Note: Presbyterian joined Division I in 1915.)	35	22	11	2	.657
Wisconsin	67	40	20	7	.649
VMI	81	50	26	5	.648
USC (Note: USC did not field a team during the 1911–1913 seasons.)	48	29	15	4	.646
Brown	93	57	30	6	.645
Kansas	76	45	23	8	.645
Lehigh	91	57	31	3	.643
Maryland	83	50	27	6	.639
Chicago	73	45	25	3	.637
Iowa State	73	45	25	3	.637
California (Note: California resumed football play in 1915.)	53	32	18	3	.632
Colorado Mines	65	39	22	4	.631
West Virginia	79	46	26	7	.627
Kansas State	85	50	29	6	.624
Tennessee	70	40	23	7	.621
Colorado	67	40	24	3	.619
Washington State	59	36	22	1	.619
Sewanee	82	46	27	9	.616
LSU	74	43	26	5	.615
Utah	58	34	21	3	.612
Cornell	82	49	31	2	.610
North Carolina State	70	40	25	5	.607
Florida	61	36	23	2	.607
Carlisle (Note: Carlisle dropped football after the 1917 season.)	93	53	34	6	.602
Arkansas	79	46	30	3	.601
North Carolina (Note: North Carolina did not field a team during the 1917 & 1918 seasons.)	70	40	26	4	.600
Utah State	61	35	23	3	.598
Missouri	72	39	25	8	.597
Baylor	87	46	31	10	.586
Iowa	73	42	30	1	.582
Oregon State	76	40	28	8	.579
Lafayette	92	50	37	5	.571
Stanford (Note: Stanford restarted their football team in 1919.)	7	4	3	0	.571
Oklahoma State	79	43	32	4	.570
TCU	85	45	34	6	.565
Davidson	79	42	32	5	.563
Washington (MO)	68	36	28	4	.559
Denver	76	39	32	5	.546
Clemson	83	42	35	6	.542
Temple (Note: Temple did not field a team from 1918–1921.)	48	22	20	6	.521
Columbia (Note: Columbia resumed football play in 1915.)	34	15	14	5	.515
Tulane	72	35	33	4	.514
Ole Miss	79	39	37	3	.513
Furman (Note: Furman joined Division I in 1915.)	43	21	20	2	.512
Citadel	72	33	32	7	.507
Indiana	67	32	32	3	.500
Colorado State	60	29	29	2	.500
Spring Hill (Note: Spring Hill played Division I during the 1919 season.)	7	3	3	1	.500
Boston College	75	35	36	4	.493
New Mexico	39	17	18	4	.487
Purdue	68	30	32	6	.485
Drake	75	33	37	5	.473
Bucknell	89	37	44	8	.461
Mercer	64	28	33	3	.461
West Virginia Wesleyan (Note: West Virginia Wesleyan joined Division I for the 1913–1916 seasons.)	36	16	19	1	.458
South Carolina	80	32	41	7	.444
Villanova	68	26	34	8	.441
UTEP (Note: UTEP's first season was in 1914.)	22	9	12	1	.432
SMU (Note: SMU's first season was in 1916.)	35	11	16	8	.429
Mississippi College (Note: Mississippi College joined Division I for the 1911, 1912, 1915, 1916 & 1919 seasons.)	38	15	21	2	.421
Arizona State (Note: Arizona State only fielded a team for the 1914–1916 and 1919 seasons.)	17	7	10	0	.412
Northwestern	65	25	37	3	.408
Haskell (Note: Haskell joined Division I for the 1910 & 1914–1916 seasons.)	84	15	22	0	.405
Newberry (Note: Newberry joined Division I in 1914 and also did not field a team in 1918.)	36	13	20	3	.403
Idaho (Note: Idaho joined Division I for the 1917 season.)	5	2	3	0	.400
Southwestern (TX)	63	22	37	4	.381
Wofford (Note: Wofford joined Division I in 1914.)	44	14	28	2	.341
Wyoming	64	20	43	1	.320
Dickinson (Note: Dickinson left Division I after the 1910 season.)	10	3	7	0	.300
Erskine (Note: Erskine joined Division I for the 1919 season.)	7	2	5	0	.286
Oglethorpe (Note: Oglethorpe joined Division I in 1919.)	9	2	6	1	.278
Wake Forest	74	20	53	1	.277
UCLA (Note: UCLA's first season was in 1919.)	8	2	6	0	.250
Grinnell (Note: Grinnell joined Division I in 1919.)	6	1	4	1	.250
Samford (Note: Samford did not play Division I during the 1913–1918 seasons.)	33	6	24	3	.227
Montana (Note: Montana joined Division I for the 1917 season.)	5	1	4	0	.200
Carnegie Mellon (Note: Carnegie Mellon joined Division I for the 1910 season.)	8	1	6	1	.188

Chart notes

== See also ==
- NCAA Division I FBS football win–loss records
- NCAA Division I football win–loss records in the 1920s
