= NCAA Division I football win–loss records in the 1970s =

The following list shows NCAA Division I football programs by winning percentage during the 1970–1979 football seasons. This list includes teams in Division I, and Division I-A after Division I split into two sub-divisions following the 1977 season. The following list reflects the records according to the NCAA. This list takes into account results modified later due to NCAA action, such as vacated victories and forfeits. This list only takes into account games played while in Division I-A.

NCAA Division I Football Records in the 1970s
Team	Total games	Won	Lost	Tie	Pct.
Grambling State (Note: The Southwestern Athletic Conference moved to Division I in 1977, and then joined Division I-AA in 1978.)	11	10	1	0	.909
Oklahoma	118	102	13	3	.877
Alabama	120	103	16	1	.863
Michigan	115	96	16	3	.848
Nebraska	122	98	20	4	.820
Central Michigan (Note: Central Michigan joined Division I in 1975.)	55	44	9	2	.818
Penn State	118	96	22	0	.814
Ohio State	114	91	20	3	.811
Notre Dame	113	91	22	0	.805
USC	119	93	21	5	.803
Texas	115	88	26	1	.770
Tennessee State (Note: Tennessee State joined Division I in 1977.)	32	24	7	1	.766
Ball State (Note: Ball State joined Division I in 1975.)	55	42	13	0	.764
Arizona State	128	90	28	0	.763
Yale	90	67	21	2	.756
San Diego State	110	82	26	2	.755
Miami (OH)	108	80	26	2	.750
UNLV (Note: UNLV joined Division I in 1978)	23	16	5	2	.739
Jackson State	11	8	3	0	.727
McNeese State (Note: McNeese State joined Division I in 1975.)	57	40	16	1	.711
Arkansas	115	79	31	5	.709
Houston	115	80	33	2	.704
Dartmouth	90	60	27	3	.683
Rutgers	110	74	35	1	.677
East Carolina	110	73	36	1	.668
Georgia	115	75	38	2	.661
Temple (Note: Temple joined Division I in 1971.)	93	60	30	3	.661
Tennessee	117	75	39	3	.654
LSU	117	74	40	3	.645
UCLA	112	69	37	6	.643
East Tennessee State (Note: East Tennessee State joined Division I in 1979.)	11	7	4	0	.636
Stanford	111	70	40	4	.632
Arkansas State (Note: Arkansas State joined Division I in 1974.)	65	41	24	0	.631
Auburn	112	69	40	3	.629
North Carolina	117	72	42	3	.628
BYU	105	71	43	1	.622
Texas Tech	116	70	42	4	.621
Pittsburgh	115	70	43	2	.617
Harvard	90	54	34	2	.611
Maryland	116	69	45	2	.603
Colorado	114	67	46	1	.592
North Carolina State	116	66	45	5	.591
Texas Southern	11	6	4	1	.591
Utah State	109	63	45	1	.583
Louisiana Tech (Note: Louisiana Tech joined Division I in 1975.)	55	31	22	2	.582
Washington	111	64	47	0	.577
Texas A&M	114	65	49	0	.570
Boston College	111	62	47	0	.569
Long Beach State	111	62	47	2	.568
Colgate	103	57	44	2	.563
Western Carolina (Note: Western Carolina joined Division I in 1977.)	33	18	14	1	.561
Memphis	109	60	48	1	.555
Tulsa	110	60	49	1	.550
Michigan State	109	58	47	4	.550
Georgia Tech	114	61	50	3	.548
Arizona	111	60	50	1	.545
Florida State	113	60	53	0	.531
West Virginia	112	59	53	0	.527
California	111	58	52	1	.527
San Jose State	113	57	51	5	.527
Bowling Green	106	54	49	3	.524
Northwestern State (Note: Northwestern State joined Division I for the 1976 & 1977 seasons.)	21	11	10	0	.524
Furman	110	55	50	5	.523
Florida	114	58	53	3	.522
Toledo	112	58	53	1	.522
Louisville	110	55	51	4	.518
Brown	89	45	42	2	.517
Western Michigan	108	55	52	1	.514
Oklahoma State	112	56	53	3	.513
Missouri	114	58	56	0	.509
Clemson	113	56	54	3	.509
Ole Miss	110	56	54	0	.509
Purdue	110	55	53	2	.509
Chattanooga (Note: Chattanooga joined Division I in 1971.)	99	48	47	4	.505
Iowa State	114	57	56	1	.504
South Carolina	113	56	55	2	.504
Mississippi State	111	54	54	3	.500
Southern Miss	111	54	54	3	.500
Mississippi Valley State	10	5	5	0	.500
Cincinnati	110	53	55	2	.491
Hawaii (Note: Hawaii joined Division I in 1974.)	66	32	34	0	.485
Citadel	110	53	57	0	.482
New Mexico	112	52	57	3	.478
Appalachian State (Note: Appalachian State joined Division I in 1972.)	88	40	45	3	.472
Tulane	113	53	60	0	.469
North Texas	110	50	57	3	.468
Kent State	111	51	59	1	.464
Minnesota	110	50	58	2	.464
Louisiana–Lafayette (Note: Louisiana–Lafayette joined Division I in 1974.)	67	30	35	2	.463
Cornell	90	40	47	3	.461
Fresno State	112	51	60	1	.460
Pacific	110	49	59	2	.455
SMU	110	48	59	3	.450
William & Mary	111	49	61	1	.446
Wisconsin	109	46	58	5	.445
Navy	111	49	62	0	.441
Kentucky	111	48	61	2	.441
Villanova	110	47	61	2	.436
Virginia Tech	110	47	61	2	.436
West Texas A&M	118	45	59	4	.435
Colorado State	112	47	62	3	.433
Duke	110	45	60	5	.432
Ohio	106	45	60	1	.429
Dayton (Note: Dayton left Division I after the 1976 season.)	76	31	42	3	.428
Indiana State (Note: Indiana State joined Division I in 1975.)	52	22	30	0	.423
Penn	90	37	51	2	.422
Richmond	106	44	62	0	.415
Syracuse	110	45	64	1	.414
Baylor	111	44	64	3	.410
Idaho (Note: Idaho left Division I after the 1974 season.)	55	22	32	1	.409
Texas-Arlington (Note: Texas-Arlington joined Division I in 1971.)	98	40	58	0	.408
Kansas	112	44	66	2	.402
Air Force	108	42	64	2	.398
Utah	111	44	67	0	.396
New Mexico State	109	42	65	2	.394
Northern Illinois	109	42	65	2	.394
Princeton	90	33	53	4	.389
Miami (FL)	109	42	67	0	.385
Southern Illinois (Note: Southern Illinois joined Division I in 1972.)	87	32	52	3	.385
Eastern Michigan (Note: Eastern Michigan joined Division I in 1975.)	53	19	33	1	.368
Illinois	109	38	67	4	.367
Lamar (Note: Lamar joined Division I in 1973.)	75	26	46	3	.367
Holy Cross	108	37	68	3	.356
Wyoming	112	39	72	1	.353
VMI	109	38	70	1	.353
Army	107	36	68	3	.350
Vanderbilt	111	37	71	3	.347
Washington State	110	37	72	1	.341
Indiana	110	36	72	2	.336
Oregon	110	36	73	1	.332
Drake (Note: Drake joined Division I in 1971.)	100	32	67	1	.325
Kansas State	110	35	75	0	.318
Southern	11	3	7	1	.318
Cal State Fullerton (Note: Cal State Fullerton joined Division I in 1975.)	56	17	38	1	.313
Wake Forest	111	34	76	1	.311
Illinois State (Note: Illinois State joined Division I in 1975.)	54	15	37	2	.296
Virginia	110	32	77	1	.295
Columbia	90	25	62	3	.294
Wichita State	108	31	76	1	.292
Rice	109	29	77	3	.280
Iowa	109	29	78	2	.275
Alcorn State	11	3	8	0	.273
Prairie View A&M	11	3	8	0	.273
Northwestern	109	28	80	1	.261
TCU	110	26	81	3	.250
Oregon State	111	27	83	1	.248
Xavier (Note: Xavier dropped their football program after 1973.)	41	9	31	1	.232
UC Santa Barbara (Note: UC Santa Barbara left Division I after the 1971 season.)	22	5	17	0	.227
UTEP	110	23	87	0	.209
Marshall	106	22	84	0	.208
Davidson (Note: Davidson left Division I after the 1973 season.)	41	8	32	1	.207
Buffalo (Note: Buffalo suspended its football program after the 1970 season.)	11	2	9	0	.182
Cal State Los Angeles (Note: Cal State Los Angeles left Division I after the 1971 season.)	20	3	17	0	.150

Chart notes

== See also ==
- NCAA Division I FBS football win–loss records
- NCAA Division I football win–loss records in the 1960s
- NCAA Division I-A football win–loss records in the 1980s
