= NCAA Division I football win–loss records in the 1960s =

The following list shows NCAA Division I football programs by winning percentage during the 1960–1969 football seasons. During this time Division I was known as the University Division. The following list reflects the records according to the NCAA. This list takes into account results modified later due to NCAA action, such as vacated victories and forfeits.

NCAA Division I Football Records in the 1960s
Team	Total games	Won	Lost	Tie	Pct.
San Diego State (Note: San Diego State joined Division I in 1969.)	11	11	0	0	1.000
Alabama	110	90	16	4	.836
Texas	108	86	19	3	.810
Arkansas	107	82	24	1	.771
Ohio State	91	68	21	2	.758
Dartmouth	90	68	22	0	.756
Missouri	105	76	23	6	.752
USC	105	76	25	4	.743
Ole Miss	108	77	25	6	.741
Penn State	105	77	27	1	.738
LSU	107	76	26	5	.734
Memphis	96	70	25	1	.734
Arizona State	99	72	26	1	.732
Bowling Green (Note: Bowling Green joined Division I in 1962.)	77	55	20	2	.727
Long Beach State (Note: Long Beach State joined Division I in 1969.)	11	8	3	0	.727
Wyoming	101	72	27	2	.723
Nebraska	106	75	30	1	.712
Princeton	90	64	26	0	.711
Miami (OH) (Note: Miami (OH) joined Division I in 1962.)	81	55	22	4	.704
Purdue	96	65	28	3	.693
Florida	105	70	31	4	.686
Utah State	102	68	31	3	.681
Syracuse	102	69	33	0	.676
Harvard	90	58	27	5	.672
Tennessee	105	67	32	6	.667
Yale	90	57	29	4	.656
Oregon State	102	65	35	2	.647
Notre Dame	100	62	34	4	.640
Auburn	104	65	37	2	.635
Michigan State	96	59	34	3	.630
Virginia Tech	103	62	37	2	.624
Rutgers	92	57	35	0	.620
New Mexico State	101	61	37	3	.619
Army	100	60	37	3	.615
West Texas A&M	101	61	39	1	.609
Minnesota	97	57	36	4	.608
Oklahoma	104	62	40	2	.606
Buffalo (Note: Buffalo joined Division I in 1962.)	76	44	28	4	.605
Georgia	105	59	38	8	.600
Fresno State (Note: Fresno State joined Division I in 1969.)	10	6	4	0	.600
UC Santa Barbara (Note: UC Santa Barbara joined Division I in 1969.)	10	6	4	0	.600
UCLA	102	59	39	4	.598
Southern Miss (Note: Southern Miss joined Division I in 1963.)	66	39	26	1	.598
Georgia Tech	104	61	41	2	.596
Florida State	104	55	38	11	.582
Houston	101	56	40	5	.579
Michigan	97	55	40	2	.577
East Carolina (Note: East Carolina joined Division I in 1965.)	49	27	21	1	.561
North Carolina State	102	55	44	3	.554
Washington	102	54	43	5	.554
West Virginia	102	54	43	5	.554
Miami (FL)	104	56	45	3	.553
Duke	101	54	44	3	.550
Ohio (Note: Ohio joined Division I in 1962.)	82	44	36	2	.549
Boston College	96	52	43	1	.547
North Texas	97	51	42	4	.546
Colorado	103	55	46	2	.544
Villanova	94	51	43	0	.543
Utah	102	53	48	1	.525
Xavier	100	51	46	3	.525
Colgate	93	46	42	5	.522
Arizona	101	51	47	3	.520
Oregon	103	50	48	5	.510
Kansas	102	50	48	4	.510
Clemson	100	50	48	2	.510
Toledo (Note: Toledo joined Division I in 1962.)	79	39	38	2	.506
Tulsa	102	51	51	0	.500
Navy	102	49	49	4	.500
Holy Cross (Note: Holy Cross missed the 1969 football season due to an outbreak of Hepatitis A.)	89	42	43	4	.494
Citadel	101	49	51	1	.490
Texas Tech	102	47	51	4	.480
Western Michigan (Note: Western Michigan joined Division I in 1962.)	74	35	38	1	.480
Stanford	100	46	51	3	.475
Louisville (Note: Louisville joined Division I in 1962.)	80	37	42	1	.469
Cornell	90	40	46	4	.467
Air Force	101	45	52	4	.465
UTEP	100	43	52	5	.455
Baylor	103	45	57	1	.442
Cincinnati	99	43	55	1	.439
Davidson	90	38	49	3	.439
New Mexico	102	44	57	1	.436
Montana (Note: Montana left Division I after the 1962 season.)	28	12	16	0	.429
BYU	101	42	58	1	.421
TCU	101	40	56	5	.421
Richmond	100	41	57	2	.420
George Washington (Note: George Washington dropped football after the 1966 season.)	66	27	38	1	.417
Furman	100	40	57	3	.415
Iowa	94	37	54	3	.410
North Carolina	101	41	60	0	.406
Northwestern	95	38	56	1	.405
Maryland	99	40	59	0	.404
Detroit Mercy (Note: Detroit Mercy dropped football after the 1964 season.)	46	18	27	1	.402
Pacific	98	39	59	0	.398
Kent State (Note: Kent State joined Division I in 1962.)	77	29	45	3	.396
Kentucky	98	37	58	5	.395
Virginia	100	39	60	1	.395
Iowa State	99	37	58	4	.394
South Carolina	101	37	59	5	.391
Wichita State	99	38	60	1	.389
William & Mary	100	37	60	3	.385
Rice	102	37	61	4	.382
Illinois	96	36	59	1	.380
San Jose State	99	37	61	1	.379
California	101	36	61	4	.376
Wisconsin	96	34	59	3	.370
VMI	100	35	62	3	.365
Pittsburgh	100	34	61	5	.365
Washington State	100	34	61	5	.365
Oklahoma State	99	35	62	2	.364
Penn	90	32	57	1	.361
Idaho	97	34	62	1	.356
SMU	103	35	65	3	.354
Indiana	96	33	62	1	.349
Dayton	100	32	64	4	.340
Mississippi State	99	31	63	5	.338
Marshall (Note: Marshall joined Division I in 1962.)	80	26	52	2	.338
Texas A&M	101	31	64	6	.337
Columbia	90	29	59	2	.333
Marquette (Note: Marquette dropped football after the 1960 season.)	9	3	6	0	.333
Colorado State	101	31	69	1	.312
Boston University (Note: Boston University left Division I after 1964.)	45	12	30	3	.300
Denver (Note: Denver dropped football after the 1960 season.)	10	3	7	0	.300
Wake Forest	100	27	72	1	.275
Vanderbilt	100	24	70	6	.270
Tulane	100	24	73	3	.255
Brown	89	21	65	3	.253
Northern Illinois (Note: Northern Illinois joined Division I in 1968.)	20	5	15	0	.250
Kansas State	99	18	80	1	.187
Hardin–Simmons (Note: Hardin–Simmons left Division I after the 1962 season.)	30	1	29	0	.033
Cal State Los Angeles (Note: Cal State Los Angeles joined Division I in 1969.)	9	0	9	0	.000

Chart notes

== See also ==
- NCAA Division I FBS football win–loss records
- NCAA Division I football win–loss records in the 1950s
- NCAA Division I football win–loss records in the 1970s
