= NCAA Division I-A football win–loss records in the 1990s =

The following list shows NCAA Division I-A football programs by winning percentage during the 1990-1999 football seasons. The following list reflects the records according to the NCAA. This list takes into account results modified later due to NCAA action, such as vacated victories and forfeits. This list only takes into account games played while in Division I-A.

NCAA Division I-A Football Records in the 1990s
Team	Total games	Won	Lost	Tie	Pct.
Marshall (Note: Marshall joined I-A in 1997.)	39	35	4	0	.897
Florida State	123	109	13	1	.890
Nebraska	125	108	16	1	.868
Florida	125	102	22	1	.820
Tennessee	123	99	22	2	.813
Penn State	123	97	26	0	.789
Michigan	122	93	26	3	.775
Miami (FL)	119	92	27	0	.773
Texas A&M	124	94	28	2	.766
Ohio State	124	91	30	3	.746
Colorado	120	87	29	4	.742
Kansas State	118	87	30	1	.742
Notre Dame	121	84	35	2	.702
Washington	118	82	35	1	.699
Syracuse	120	82	35	3	.696
BYU	127	86	39	2	.685
Alabama	123	83	40	0	.675
North Carolina	118	78	39	1	.665
Virginia Tech	117	77	39	1	.662
Virginia	119	78	40	1	.660
Toledo	113	72	38	3	.650
Nevada (Note: Nevada joined I-A in 1992.)	94	61	33	0	.649
Air Force	122	78	44	0	.639
Auburn	115	72	40	3	.639
Georgia	116	72	43	1	.625
Texas	120	74	44	2	.625
Colorado State	120	74	46	0	.617
Miami (OH)	110	65	40	5	.614
Utah	117	71	46	0	.607
Arizona	118	71	46	1	.622
Wisconsin	118	69	45	4	.602
UCLA	115	69	46	0	.600
Idaho (Note: Idaho joined I-A in 1996.)	45	27	18	0	.600
Wyoming	118	70	47	1	.597
Western Michigan	111	65	44	2	.595
Clemson	117	69	47	1	.594
Oregon	118	70	48	0	.593
UCF (Note: UCF joined I-A in 1996.)	44	23	21	0	.523
Southern Miss	114	67	46	1	.592
East Carolina	114	67	47	0	.588
Ole Miss	115	67	48	0	.583
USC	121	68	49	4	.579
Fresno State	120	68	50	2	.575
Georgia Tech	116	66	49	1	.573
West Virginia	116	65	49	2	.569
Bowling Green	111	61	46	4	.568
North Carolina State	118	66	51	1	.564
Mississippi State	116	64	50	2	.560
Boise State	120	67	53	0	.558
Louisiana Tech	112	61	48	3	.558
Arizona State	113	62	51	0	.549
Oklahoma	115	61	51	3	.543
San Diego State	116	62	52	2	.543
Texas Tech	115	62	53	0	.539
Iowa	117	62	53	2	.538
Michigan State	117	62	53	2	.538
Stanford	116	60	54	2	.526
Louisville	114	59	54	1	.522
Central Michigan	112	54	53	5	.504
Boston College	116	57	57	2	.500
Kansas	114	56	57	1	.496
Arkansas	115	55	58	2	.487
California	115	55	59	1	.483
LSU	113	54	58	1	.482
Rice	110	52	57	1	.477
Ball State	112	52	58	2	.473
Washington State	114	53	61	0	.465
TCU	113	51	61	1	.456
Army	111	50	60	1	.455
Illinois	115	50	63	2	.443
Baylor	113	49	63	1	.438
Utah State	112	48	63	1	.433
UAB (Note: UAB joined I-A in 1996.)	44	19	25	0	.432
Purdue	114	47	64	3	.425
Indiana	113	47	64	2	.425
Memphis	110	45	64	1	.414
Hawaii	122	49	71	2	.410
San Jose State	112	44	66	2	.402
Missouri	113	43	67	3	.394
Cincinnati	111	43	67	1	.392
South Carolina	111	42	66	3	.392
Kentucky	113	44	69	0	.389
New Mexico	116	45	71	0	.388
Navy	112	43	69	0	.384
Houston	111	42	68	1	.383
Northwestern	114	43	70	1	.382
Oklahoma State	112	41	68	3	.379
Akron	110	40	68	2	.373
Louisiana-Monroe (Note: Louisiana-Monroe joined I-A in 1994.) (Note: Louisiana-Monroe went by the name Northeast Louisiana until 1999.)	67	25	42	0	.373
Tulsa	111	40	70	1	.365
Long Beach State (Note: Long Beach State dropped their football program after the 1991 season.)	22	8	14	0	.364
Louisiana-Lafayette (Note: Louisiana-Lafayette went by the name Southwestern Louisiana until 1999.)	110	39	70	1	.359
Pacific (Note: Pacific dropped their football program after the 1995 season.)	67	24	43	0	.358
Minnesota	112	40	72	0	.357
Maryland	111	38	72	1	.347
Rutgers	110	37	72	1	.341
Tulane	112	38	74	0	.339
Wake Forest	112	38	74	0	.339
Pittsburgh	112	37	74	1	.335
Eastern Michigan	110	35	74	1	.323
Ohio	111	34	74	3	.320
Vanderbilt	110	34	76	0	.309
Duke	111	33	77	1	.302
New Mexico State	110	33	77	0	.300
SMU	110	31	76	3	.295
UNLV	112	33	79	0	.295
Northern Illinois	110	32	78	0	.291
North Texas (Note: North Texas joined I-A in 1995.)	55	16	39	0	.291
Middle Tennessee (Note: Middle Tennessee joined I-A in 1999.)	11	3	8	0	.273
Arkansas State	111	29	80	2	.270
Oregon State	111	29	81	1	.266
Iowa State	110	27	80	3	.259
UTEP	114	28	84	2	.254
Temple	110	22	88	0	.200
Cal State Fullerton (Note: Cal State Fullerton dropped their football program after the 1992 season.)	34	5	29	0	.147
Kent State	110	15	94	1	.141
Buffalo (Note: Buffalo joined I-A in 1999.)	11	0	11	0	.000

Chart notes

== See also ==
- NCAA Division I FBS football win–loss records
- NCAA Division I-A football win–loss records in the 1980s
- NCAA Division I FBS football win–loss records in the 2000s
