= NCAA Division I FBS football win–loss records in the 2010s =

The following list shows NCAA Division I FBS football programs by winning percentage during the 2010–2019 football seasons. The following list reflects the records according to the NCAA. This list takes into account results modified later due to NCAA action, such as vacated victories and forfeits. This list only takes into account games played while in Division I FBS.

== Table ==
NCAA Division I FBS Football Records in the 2010s
Team	Won	Lost	Pct.	Games
Alabama	124	15	.892	139
Ohio State (Note: Ohio State had 12 victories vacated during the 2010 season.)	105	18	.854	135
Clemson	117	23	.836	140
Oklahoma	109	25	.813	134
Boise State	107	26	.805	133
Appalachian State (Note: Appalachian State joined FBS in 2014.)	61	17	.782	78
Oregon	101	32	.759	133
Wisconsin	102	34	.750	136
Stanford	98	35	.737	133
Georgia	100	36	.735	136
Florida State	96	37	.722	133
Oklahoma State	93	37	.715	130
LSU (Note: LSU had 37 victories vacated by the NCAA between the 2012-2015 seasons.)	66	28	.702	131
Michigan State	92	40	.697	132
San Diego State	90	42	.682	132
UCF	88	42	.677	130
Penn State	87	42	.674	129
TCU	87	42	.674	129
Northern Illinois	91	44	.674	135
Toledo	85	43	.664	128
Auburn	87	45	.659	132
Michigan	85	44	.659	129
Notre Dame (Note: Notre Dame had 12 victories vacated during the 2012 season.)	71	37	.657	120
USC	86	45	.656	131
Texas A&M	84	46	.646	130
Washington	85	48	.639	133
Baylor	83	47	.638	130
Utah	83	47	.638	130
Florida	81	46	.638	127
Virginia Tech	84	49	.632	123
Kansas State	81	48	.628	129
Louisville	81	48	.628	129
Houston	80	48	.625	128
Iowa	81	49	.623	130
Ohio	81	50	.618	131
Arkansas State	79	49	.617	128
Cincinnati	79	49	.617	128
Navy	80	50	.615	130
Mississippi State	79	51	.608	130
Louisiana Tech	78	51	.605	129
Marshall	78	51	.605	129
South Carolina	78	51	.605	129
BYU	77	53	.592	130
West Virginia	75	52	.591	127
Miami (FL)	75	53	.586	128
Nebraska	75	54	.581	129
Air Force	73	55	.570	128
Western Kentucky	73	55	.570	128
Utah State	74	56	.569	130
Temple	72	55	.567	127
Arizona State	73	56	.566	129
Missouri (Note: Louisiana had 9 victories vacated by the NCAA between the 2015-2016 seasons.)	67	52	.563	128
Northwestern	72	56	.563	128
Georgia Southern (Note: Georgia Southern joined FBS in 2014.)	42	33	.560	75
Liberty (Note: Liberty joined FBS in 2018.)	14	11	.560	25
North Carolina State	71	57	.555	128
Texas	71	57	.555	128
Nevada	68	60	.531	128
Pittsburgh	69	61	.531	130
North Carolina	67	60	.528	127
Western Michigan	67	60	.528	127
Troy	65	59	.524	124
Memphis	67	61	.523	128
Fresno State	68	62	.523	130
Minnesota	66	61	.520	127
Georgia Tech	66	62	.516	128
Middle Tennessee	64	63	.504	127
South Florida	62	62	.500	124
UCLA	64	64	.500	128
Arizona	63	64	.496	127
Duke	63	64	.496	127
Washington State	61	65	.484	126
Texas Tech	60	65	.480	125
Southern Miss	60	66	.476	126
Tennessee (Note: Tennessee had 8 victories vacated by the NCAA during the 2019 season.)	55	62	.470	125
Tulsa	59	67	.468	126
Syracuse	58	66	.468	124
Louisiana (Note: Louisiana had 22 victories vacated by the NCAA between the 2011-2014 seasons.)	50	57	.467	107
Arkansas	58	67	.464	125
Kentucky	57	68	.456	125
UAB (Note: UAB dropped their football program from the 2014-2016 seasons.)	46	55	.455	101
Boston College	57	69	.452	126
SMU	57	69	.452	126
Wyoming	56	69	.448	125
Colorado State	56	70	.444	126
East Carolina	55	69	.444	124
Central Michigan	56	71	.441	127
Army	55	70	.440	125
FIU	55	70	.440	125
California	54	70	.435	124
Bowling Green	55	72	.433	127
Wake Forest	54	71	.432	125
Buffalo	53	70	.431	123
UTSA (Note: UTSA joined FBS in 2012.)	41	55	.427	96
Ball State	52	70	.426	122
Old Dominion (Note: Old Dominion joined FBS in 2014.)	31	42	.425	73
North Texas	53	72	.424	125
Vanderbilt	53	72	.424	125
Hawaii	55	77	.417	132
Virginia	52	73	.416	125
Iowa State	51	74	.408	125
Florida Atlantic	50	74	.403	124
Maryland	50	74	.403	124
Indiana	49	74	.398	123
Rutgers	49	75	.395	124
Louisiana-Monroe	48	74	.393	122
Miami (OH)	48	77	.384	125
Rice	47	78	.376	125
Illinois	46	78	.371	124
Coastal Carolina (Note: Coastal Carolina joined FBS in 2017.)	13	23	.361	36
Kent State	44	78	.361	122
Colorado	44	80	.355	124
San Jose State	44	80	.355	124
Tulane	44	80	.355	124
Oregon State	43	79	.352	122
Purdue	43	81	.347	124
South Alabama (Note: South Alabama joined FBS in 2012.)	34	65	.343	99
Eastern Michigan	40	83	.325	123
Texas State (Note: Texas State joined FBS in 2012.)	30	66	.313	96
Charlotte (Note: Charlotte joined FBS in 2015.)	19	42	.311	61
UConn	38	84	.311	122
Georgia State (Note: Georgia State joined FBS in 2013.)	26	60	.302	86
Akron	37	86	.301	123
New Mexico	37	86	.301	123
Ole Miss (Note: Ole Miss had 33 victories vacated by the NCAA between the 2010-2016 seasons.)	27	64	.297	91
Idaho (Note: Idaho left FBS after the 2017 season.)	28	69	.289	97
UNLV	35	89	.282	124
UTEP	34	88	.279	122
New Mexico State	29	93	.238	122
Massachusetts (Note: Massachusetts joined FBS in 2012.)	19	77	.198	96
Kansas	21	99	.175	120

Chart notes

== See also ==
- NCAA Division I FBS football win–loss records
- NCAA Division I FBS football win–loss records in the 2000s
