= NCAA Division I FCS football win–loss records =

The following data is current as of August 1, 2026, during week 0 of the 2026 season, which ends with the 2026 NCAA Division I Football Championship Game. The following reflects the records according to the National Collegiate Athletic Association (NCAA). This list took into account results modified later due to NCAA action, such as vacated victories and forfeits. Percentages are figured to 3 decimal places. In the event of a tie, the team with the most wins is listed first.

NCAA Division I FCS football records
Team	Won	Lost	Tied	Pct.	Years	Conference
Yale	952	396	55	.698	152	Ivy League
Harvard	918	415	50	.682	150	Ivy League
Grambling State	588	280	15	.674	82	SWAC
Princeton	868	435	50	.660	155	Ivy League
Dayton	718	400	25	.639	117	Pioneer
St. Thomas (MN)	661	368	32	.638	119	Pioneer
Tennessee State	597	339	32	.633	102	OVC
Florida A&M	596	341	22	.633	107	SWAC
Penn	888	523	42	.626	148	Ivy League
Jackson State	496	313	15	.611	79	SWAC
McNeese	483	305	14	.611	74	Southland
Southern	598	380	25	.609	103	SWAC
South Carolina State	577	364	27	.610	103	MEAC
North Dakota	694	446	30	.606	129	MVFC
North Alabama	483	309	16	.608	76	UAC
Northern Iowa	707	464	47	.600	127	MVFC
Dartmouth	748	475	46	.608	143	Ivy League
Eastern Kentucky	631	414	38	.600	112	UAC
Central Arkansas	614	416	42	.592	113	UAC
San Diego	354	242	6	.593	59	Pioneer
Bethune–Cookman	510	351	27	.590	98	SWAC
Youngstown State	517	367	17	.583	85	MVFC
South Dakota State	678	485	36	.580	127	MVFC
UAlbany	312	248	0	.557	53	CAA Football
Eastern Washington	588	451	22	.565	117	BSC
Villanova	681	510	41	.569	128	Patriot
Hampton	585	468	36	.554	123	CAA Football
Duquesne	420	317	18	.568	78	NEC
Colgate	681	534	50	.558	135	Patriot
Furman	645	498	38	.562	119	SoCon
Alcorn State	495	387	39	.559	101	SWAC
Monmouth	197	151	0	.566	33	CAA Football
UC Davis	568	446	33	.558	107	BSC
Montana	659	522	26	.557	126	BSC
East Texas A&M	560	457	31	.549	106	Southland
New Haven	294	188	5	.609	47	NEC
Holy Cross	680	559	55	.547	130	Patriot
North Carolina A&T	532	452	40	.539	101	CAA Football
Butler	623	509	35	.549	136	Pioneer
Fordham	570	485	48	.539	124	Patriot
New Hampshire	618	507	54	.547	129	CAA Football
North Carolina Central	497	411	27	.546	100	MEAC
Drake	658	550	29	.544	132	Pioneer
Cornell	666	568	34	.539	137	Ivy League
Cal Poly	525	468	19	.528	107	BSC
Abilene Christian	518	454	32	.532	103	UAC
Elon	547	489	18	.528	104	CAA Football
Lehigh	728	645	45	.529	142	Patriot
Lafayette	714	650	39	.523	144	Patriot
Bryant	141	144	0	.495	27	CAA Football
Montana State	575	507	34	.530	121	BSC
Towson	314	289	4	.521	56	CAA Football
Georgetown	501	466	32	.518	113	Patriot
Southeastern Louisiana	372	346	17	.518	75	Southland
Northwestern State	544	508	33	.517	116	Southland
West Georgia	241	227	0	.515	45	UAC
Western Illinois	556	533	37	.510	122	OVC
Merrimack	153	149	0	.507	30	Independent
Murray State	502	495	36	.503	101	MVFC
Howard	530	512	40	.508	129	MEAC
Alabama A&M	450	432	33	.510	100	SWAC
Maine	566	551	38	.506	134	CAA Football
Stetson	206	215	27	.490	61	Pioneer
Northern Arizona	512	495	23	.508	111	BSC
Wagner	428	425	19	.502	95	NEC
William & Mary	620	603	39	.507	131	Patriot
Alabama State	510	499	43	.505	119	SWAC
Tarleton State	331	325	3	.505	64	UAC
Wofford	552	542	36	.504	116	SoCon
Brown	633	626	40	.503	139	Ivy League
Chattanooga	565	558	33	.503	117	SoCon
South Dakota	587	568	36	.508	130	MVFC
Samford	493	489	47	.502	109	SoCon
Weber State	347	355	3	.494	64	BSC
Lindenwood	192	195	2	.496	35	OVC
Bucknell	625	641	51	.494	140	Patriot
Morgan State	460	478	35	.491	105	MEAC
Stony Brook	214	221	2	.492	42	CAA Football
Illinois State	560	582	68	.491	130	MVFC
Presbyterian	534	560	35	.488	113	Pioneer
Eastern Illinois	537	586	44	.479	125	OVC
Mercyhurst	213	236	4	.475	45	NEC
Prairie View A&M	592	541	34	.522	101	SWAC
Portland State	352	396	7	.471	71	BSC
Mercer	196	218	14	.474	51	SoCon
Southeast Missouri State	505	569	37	.471	120	OVC
Norfolk State	354	416	13	.460	84	MEAC
Southern Illinois	494	566	32	.467	110	MVFC
Richmond	601	676	53	.472	142	Patriot
The Citadel	524	603	32	.466	117	SoCon
Northern Colorado	456	537	23	.460	112	BSC
Central Connecticut	362	412	21	.469	86	NEC
Gardner–Webb	281	322	2	.466	56	OVC
Idaho State	493	574	20	.463	121	BSC
Sacred Heart	173	196	0	.469	35	CAA Football
East Tennessee State	386	454	27	.461	90	SoCon
Southern Utah	298	347	6	.462	63	BSC
Stonehill	161	202	3	.444	37	NEC
Robert Morris	151	182	1	.454	32	NEC
Incarnate Word	74	90	0	.451	16	Southland
Tennessee Tech	440	552	31	.445	103	Southern
LIU	40	41	1	.494	13	NEC
Marist	205	267	3	.435	47	Pioneer
Delaware State	379	490	11	.437	98	MEAC
UT Martin	233	292	1	.444	47	OVC
Idaho	504	656	26	.436	127	BSC
Arkansas–Pine Bluff	368	493	44	.431	95	SWAC
Valparaiso	407	552	27	.426	105	Pioneer
Texas Southern	337	454	27	.428	79	SWAC
Stephen F. Austin	399	546	31	.425	98	Southland
Morehead State	382	520	22	.425	96	Pioneer
Davidson	472	659	45	.420	128	Pioneer
Indiana State	410	583	23	.415	112	MVFC
Lamar	229	322	9	.417	54	Southland
Nicholls	238	334	4	.417	53	Southland
Charleston Southern	151	228	0	.398	35	OVC
Western Carolina	364	538	23	.406	91	SoCon
VMI	496	737	42	.405	134	SoCon
Rhode Island	446	646	43	.412	127	CAA Football
Columbia	420	706	43	.378	134	Ivy League
Austin Peay	325	564	16	.368	88	UAC
Mississippi Valley State	244	440	12	.359	72	SWAC
Campbell	61	126	0	.326	18	CAA Football
Utah Tech	64	150	0	.299	20	BSC
Houston Christian	22	82	0	.212	11	Southland
Chicago State	0	0	0	–	0	Independent

^{*}Ties count as one-half win and one-half loss.

== Big Sky Conference ==
Big Sky Conference
School	Won	Lost	Tied	Pct.	Years
Eastern Washington	588	451	22	.565	117
UC Davis	568	446	33	.558	107
Montana	659	522	26	.557	126
Montana State	575	507	34	.530	121
Cal Poly	525	468	19	.528	107
Northern Arizona	512	495	23	.508	111
Weber State	347	355	3	.494	64
Portland State	352	396	7	.471	71
Idaho State	493	574	20	.463	121
Southern Utah	298	347	6	.462	63
Northern Colorado	456	537	23	.460	112
Idaho	504	656	26	.436	127
Utah Tech	64	150	0	.299	20
Total	5,941	5,904	242	.502	97.5

== Coastal Athletic Association Football Conference ==
Colonial Athletic Association
School	Won	Lost	Tied	Pct.	Years
Monmouth	197	151	0	.566	33
UAlbany	312	248	0	.557	53
Hampton	585	468	36	.554	123
New Hampshire	618	507	54	.547	129
North Carolina A&T	532	452	40	.539	101
Elon	547	489	18	.528	104
Towson	314	289	4	.521	56
Maine	566	551	38	.506	134
Bryant	141	144	0	.495	27
Stony Brook	214	221	2	.492	42
Sacred Heart	173	196	0	.469	35
Rhode Island	446	646	43	.412	127
Campbell	61	126	0	.326	18
Total	4,706	4,488	235	.512	75.5

== Independents ==
Independents
School	Won	Lost	Tied	Pct.	Years
Merrimack	153	149	0	.507	30
Chicago State	0	0	0	–	0
Total	153	149	0	.507	15

== Ivy League ==
Ivy League
School	Won	Lost	Tied	Pct.	Years
Yale	952	396	55	.698	152
Harvard	918	415	50	.682	150
Princeton	868	435	50	.660	155
Penn	888	523	42	.626	148
Dartmouth	748	475	46	.608	143
Cornell	666	568	34	.539	137
Brown	633	626	40	.503	139
Columbia	420	706	43	.378	134
Total	6.093	4,144	360	.592	144.8

== Mid-Eastern Athletic Conference ==
Mid-Eastern Athletic Conference
School	Won	Lost	Tied	Pct.	Years
South Carolina State	577	364	27	.610	103
North Carolina Central	497	411	27	.546	100
Howard	530	512	40	.508	129
Morgan State	460	478	35	.491	105
Norfolk State	354	416	13	.460	84
Delaware State	379	490	11	.437	98
Total	2,797	2,671	153	.511	103.2

== Missouri Valley Football Conference ==
Missouri Valley Football Conference
School	Won	Lost	Tied	Pct.	Years
North Dakota	694	446	30	.606	129
Northen Iowa	707	464	47	.600	127
Youngstown State	517	367	17	.583	85
South Dakota State	678	485	36	.580	127
South Dakota	587	568	36	.508	130
Murray State	502	495	36	.503	101
Illinois State	560	582	68	.491	130
Southern Illinois	494	566	32	.467	110
Indiana State	410	583	23	.415	112
Total	5,149	4,556	325	.530	116.8

== Northeast Conference ==
Northeast Conference
School	Won	Lost	Tied	Pct.	Years
New Haven	294	188	5	.609	47
Duquesne	420	317	18	.568	78
Wagner	428	425	19	.502	95
LIU	40	41	1	.494	13
Mercyhurst	213	236	4	.475	45
Central Connecticut	362	412	21	.469	86
Robert Morris	151	182	1	.454	32
Stonehill	161	202	3	.444	37
Total	2,069	2,003	72	.508	54.1

== Ohio Valley Conference ==
Ohio Valley Conference
School	Won	Lost	Tied	Pct.	Years
Tennessee State	597	339	32	.633	102
Western Illinois	556	533	37	.510	122
Lindenwood	192	195	2	.496	35
Eastern Illinois	537	586	44	.479	125
Southeast Missouri State	505	569	37	.471	120
Gardner–Webb	281	322	2	.466	56
UT Martin	233	292	1	.444	47
Charleston Southern	151	228	0	.398	35
Total	3,052	3,064	155	.499	80.3

== Patriot League ==
Patriot League
School	Won	Lost	Tied	Pct.	Years
Villanova	681	510	41	.569	128
Colgate	681	534	50	.558	135
Holy Cross	680	559	55	.547	130
Fordham	570	485	48	.539	124
Lehigh	728	645	45	.529	142
Lafayette	714	650	39	.523	144
Georgetown	501	466	32	.518	113
William & Mary	620	603	39	.507	131
Bucknell	625	641	51	.494	140
Richmond	601	676	53	.472	142
Total	6,401	5,769	453	.525	132.9

== Pioneer Football League ==
Pioneer Football League
School	Won	Lost	Tied	Pct.	Years
Dayton	718	400	25	.639	117
St. Thomas (MN)	661	368	32	.638	119
San Diego	354	242	6	.593	59
Butler	623	509	35	.549	136
Drake	658	550	29	.544	132
Stetson	206	215	27	.490	61
Presbyterian	534	560	35	.488	113
Marist	205	267	3	.435	47
Valparaiso	407	552	27	.426	105
Morehead State	382	520	22	.425	96
Davidson	472	659	45	.420	128
Total	5,220	4,842	286	.518	101.2

== Southern Conference ==
Southern Conference
School	Won	Lost	Tied	Pct.	Years
Furman	645	498	38	.562	119
Wofford	552	542	36	.504	116
Chattanooga	565	558	33	.503	117
Samford	493	489	47	.502	109
Mercer	196	218	14	.474	51
The Citadel	524	603	32	.466	117
ETSU	386	454	27	.461	90
Western Carolina	364	538	23	.406	91
VMI	496	737	42	.405	134
Total	4,221	4,637	292	.477	105

== Southland Conference ==
Southland Conference
School	Won	Lost	Tied	Pct.	Years
McNeese	483	305	14	.611	74
Texas A&M–Commerce	560	457	31	.549	106
Southeastern Louisiana	372	346	17	.518	75
Northwestern State	544	508	33	.517	116
Incarnate Word	74	90	0	.451	16
Stephen F. Austin	399	546	31	.425	98
Lamar	229	322	9	.417	54
Nicholls	238	334	4	.417	53
Houston Christian	22	82	0	.212	11
Total	2,921	2,989	139	.494	67

== Southwestern Athletic Conference (SWAC) ==
Southwestern Athletic Conference
School	Won	Lost	Tied	Pct.	Years
Grambling State	588	280	15	.674	82
Florida A&M	596	341	22	.633	106
Jackson State	496	313	15	.611	79
Southern	598	380	25	.609	103
Bethune–Cookman	510	351	27	.590	98
Alcorn State	495	387	39	.559	101
Alabama A&M	450	432	33	.510	100
Alabama State	510	499	43	.505	119
Prairie View A&M	463	505	33	.479	101
Arkansas–Pine Bluff	368	493	44	.431	95
Texas Southern	337	454	27	.428	79
Mississippi Valley State	244	440	12	.359	72
Total	5,655	4,875	335	.536	95

== United Athletic Conference ==
United Athletic Conference
School	Won	Lost	Tied	Pct.	Years
North Alabama	483	309	16	.608	76
Eastern Kentucky	631	414	38	.600	112
Central Arkansas	614	416	42	.592	113
Abilene Christian	518	454	32	.532	103
West Georgia	241	227	0	.515	45
Tarleton State	331	325	3	.505	64
Austin Peay	325	564	16	.368	88
Total	3,489	3,178	153	.523	76
