= NCAA Division I FBS football win–loss records =

The following data is current through week 0 of the 2025 season, which will culminate in the 2026 College Football Playoff National Championship. The following list reflects the records according to the NCAA. Not all wins and losses in this list have occurred in the highest level of play, but are recognized by the NCAA. This list takes into account results modified later due to NCAA action, such as vacated victories and forfeits. Winning percentages are rounded to three decimal places. In the event of a tie, the team with highest unrounded percentage is listed first.

NCAA Division I FBS football records
Team	Won	Lost	Tied	Pct.	Years	Conference
Ohio State	990	337	53	.737	136	Big Ten
Alabama	985	345	43	.733	131	SEC
Notre Dame	972	341	42	.733	136	Independent
Michigan	1,021	362	36	.732	146	Big Ten
Boise State	511	194	2	.724	58	Mountain West
Oklahoma	960	351	53	.723	131	SEC
Texas	972	397	33	.705	133	SEC
USC	886	375	54	.694	132	Big Ten
Penn State	946	412	41	.691	139	Big Ten
Nebraska	927	430	40	.678	136	Big Ten
Tennessee	877	418	53	.670	129	SEC
Georgia	895	432	54	.668	132	SEC
Florida State	585	291	17	.665	79	ACC
Appalachian State	671	361	29	.646	96	SBC
LSU	818	438	47	.646	132	SEC
Coastal Carolina	173	98	0	.638	23	SBC
Kennesaw State	74	42	0	.638	11	C-USA
Miami (FL)	676	391	19	.631	100	ACC
James Madison	379	226	4	.626	54	SBC
Florida	767	452	40	.625	119	SEC
Clemson	809	478	45	.625	130	ACC
Auburn	807	478	47	.623	133	SEC
Georgia Southern	427	260	10	.620	62	SBC
Washington	783	474	50	.618	135	Big Ten
Texas A&M	789	509	48	.604	131	SEC
Delaware	741	486	44	.600	134	Conference USA
Virginia Tech	778	515	46	.598	132	ACC
Arizona State	641	428	24	.597	113	Big 12
Michigan State	738	494	44	.596	129	Big Ten
Utah	727	489	31	.595	132	Big 12
Miami (OH)	733	491	44	.595	137	MAC
West Virginia	789	534	45	.593	133	Big 12
Jacksonville State	622	429	39	.589	116	C-USA
Western Kentucky	625	433	30	.588	107	C-USA
Fresno State	654	454	27	.588	104	Mountain West
Wisconsin	749	526	53	.584	137	Big Ten
BYU	629	445	26	.584	101	Big 12
Central Michigan	652	460	36	.584	125	MAC
UCLA	642	456	37	.582	107	Big Ten
Oregon	721	512	46	.582	130	Big Ten
Georgia Tech	766	546	43	.581	133	ACC
Arkansas	749	546	40	.576	132	SEC
Pittsburgh	770	567	42	.574	136	ACC
Minnesota	743	549	44	.573	142	Big Ten
Army	740	548	51	.572	136	The American
Colorado	733	550	36	.569	136	Big 12
Stanford	674	507	49	.568	119	ACC
Boston College	702	533	37	.566	127	ACC
Troy	580	441	28	.566	105	SBC
Bowling Green	571	433	52	.565	107	MAC
Southern Miss	616	472	26	.565	109	SBC
San Diego State	596	457	32	.564	103	Mountain West
Syracuse	755	581	49	.563	136	ACC
Toledo	590	458	24	.562	105	MAC
Middle Tennessee	611	474	28	.562	111	C-USA
Louisiana Tech (Note: The NCAA incorrectly lists LA Tech's 1951 records as 5–4, when it was 4–5.)	647	505	37	.560	122	C-USA
North Carolina	737	577	54	.558	135	ACC
Arizona	640	507	33	.556	122	Big 12
Air Force	439	350	13	.555	70	Mountain West
Ole Miss	688	550	35	.554	131	SEC
Texas Tech	608	486	32	.554	101	Big 12
UCF	299	242	1	.553	47	Big 12
Navy	751	603	57	.552	145	The American
Western Michigan	603	491	24	.550	120	MAC
Missouri	724	593	52	.548	135	SEC
California	701	576	51	.547	130	ACC
Iowa	703	582	39	.546	137	Big Ten
TCU	696	578	57	.544	129	Big 12
Tulsa	651	545	27	.543	126	The American
Houston	479	402	15	.543	80	Big 12
Liberty	308	260	4	.542	53	C-USA
Hawaii	591	500	25	.541	109	Mountain West
Sam Houston	581	494	34	.539	110	C-USA
Northern Illinois	620	533	51	.536	124	MAC
Old Dominion	99	87	0	.532	16	SBC
Louisville	561	500	17	.528	107	ACC
UTSA	92	83	0	.526	15	The American
Marshall	639	576	47	.525	126	SBC
South Florida	177	161	0	.524	29	The American
Oklahoma State	641	582	48	.523	124	Big 12
Nevada	581	533	33	.521	119	Mountain West
Cincinnati	666	615	51	.519	138	Big 12
Maryland	684	632	43	.519	133	Big Ten
Texas State	543	506	25	.517	111	Pac-12
NC State	647	606	55	.516	134	ACC
Virginia	690	650	48	.514	136	ACC
Purdue	644	609	48	.513	138	Big Ten
South Carolina	646	617	44	.511	132	SEC
Baylor	635	608	44	.510	124	Big 12
Ohio	615	589	48	.510	130	MAC
Ball State	480	467	32	.507	101	MAC
Illinois	645	628	50	.506	136	Big Ten
East Carolina	470	460	12	.505	90	The American
Memphis	547	539	33	.504	110	The American
North Texas	551	548	33	.501	110	The American
Utah State	579	576	31	.501	128	Mountain West
Kentucky	649	656	44	.497	135	SEC
Washington State	582	592	45	.496	130	Pac-12
Louisiana	607	586	33	.496	125	SBC
Duke	548	562	31	.494	113	ACC
Rutgers	681	701	42	.493	156	Big Ten
SMU	546	564	54	.492	109	ACC
San Jose State	524	547	38	.490	108	Mountain West
Mississippi State	591	619	39	.489	126	SEC
Arkansas State	505	532	37	.487	111	SBC
Vanderbilt	628	671	50	.484	136	SEC
Wyoming	570	609	28	.484	129	Mountain West
Missouri State	502	545	40	.480	114	C-USA
South Alabama	91	100	0	.476	17	SBC
UAB	177	197	2	.473	33	The American
UMass	582	652	50	.473	143	Independent
Kansas	618	699	58	.472	136	Big 12
Oregon State	569	639	50	.472	129	Pac-12
Colorado State	548	622	33	.469	127	Mountain West
Akron	529	604	36	.468	125	MAC
UConn	531	615	38	.465	126	Independent
Kansas State	580	677	42	.463	130	Big 12
Iowa State	581	681	46	.462	134	Big 12
Tulane	577	677	38	.461	132	The American
Northwestern	571	712	44	.447	138	Big Ten
Temple	499	627	52	.446	127	The American
Eastern Michigan	495	633	47	.441	134	MAC
New Mexico	506	648	31	.440	127	Mountain West
Rice	498	661	32	.432	114	The American
Florida Atlantic	126	166	0	.432	25	The American
Buffalo	419	562	28	.429	112	MAC
Indiana	521	715	44	.424	138	Big Ten
Wake Forest	513	699	33	.420	124	ACC
UL Monroe	331	472	8	.413	75	SBC
UNLV	266	389	4	.407	58	Mountain West
New Mexico State	460	681	30	.406	129	C-USA
UTEP	414	645	30	.394	108	C-USA
Kent State	367	609	28	.379	103	MAC
Georgia State	65	117	0	.357	16	SBC
Charlotte	51	96	0	.347	15	The American
FIU	94	179	0	.344	24	C-USA

== American Conference ==
American Conference
School	Won	Lost	Tied	Pct.	Years
Army	740	548	51	.572	137
Navy	751	603	57	.552	146
Tulsa	651	545	27	.544	126
UTSA	92	83	0	.526	15
South Florida	177	161	0	.524	29
East Carolina	470	460	12	.505	90
Memphis	547	539	33	.504	110
North Texas	551	548	33	.501	110
UAB	177	197	2	.473	33
Tulane	577	677	38	.461	132
Temple	499	627	52	.445	127
Florida Atlantic	126	166	0	.432	25
Rice	498	661	32	.432	114
Charlotte	51	96	0	.347	16
Total	5880	5897	337	.499	

== Atlantic Coast Conference ==
Atlantic Coast Conference
School	Won	Lost	Tied	Pct.	Years
Florida State	585	291	17	.665	79
Miami (FL)	676	391	19	.631	100
Clemson	809	478	45	.624	130
Virginia Tech	778	515	46	.598	132
Georgia Tech	766	546	43	.581	133
Pittsburgh	770	567	42	.574	136
Stanford	674	507	49	.568	119
Boston College	702	533	37	.566	127
Syracuse	755	581	49	.563	136
North Carolina	737	577	54	.558	135
California	701	576	51	.547	130
Louisville	561	500	17	.528	107
NC State	647	606	55	.516	134
Virginia	690	650	48	.514	136
Duke	548	562	31	.494	113
SMU	677	41	54	.492	109
Wake Forest	498	694	33	.420	124
Total	11411	9122	690	.554	

== Big 12 Conference ==
Big 12 Conference
School	Won	Lost	Tied	Pct.	Years
Arizona State	641	428	24	.597	113
Utah	727	489	31	.595	132
West Virginia	789	534	45	.593	133
BYU	629	445	26	.584	101
Colorado	733	550	36	.569	136
Arizona	640	507	33	.556	122
Texas Tech	608	486	32	.554	101
UCF	299	242	1	.553	47
TCU	696	578	57	.544	129
Houston	479	402	15	.543	80
Oklahoma State	641	582	48	.523	124
Cincinnati	666	615	51	.519	138
Baylor	635	608	44	.510	124
Kansas	612	687	58	.472	136
Kansas State	580	677	42	.463	130
Iowa State	578	681	46	.461	133
Total	9933	8501	589	.538	

== Big Ten Conference ==
Big Ten Conference
School	Won	Lost	Tied	Pct.	Years
Ohio State	981	335	53	.736	136
Michigan	1015	359	36	.733	146
USC	885	374	54	.695	132
Penn State	946	412	41	.691	139
Nebraska	927	430	40	.678	136
Washington	783	474	50	.618	136
Michigan State	738	494	44	.596	129
Wisconsin	749	526	53	.584	137
UCLA	642	456	37	.582	107
Oregon	721	512	46	.582	130
Minnesota	743	549	44	.573	142
Iowa	703	582	39	.546	137
Maryland	684	632	43	.519	133
Purdue	644	609	48	.513	138
Illinois	645	628	50	.506	136
Rutgers	681	701	42	.493	156
Northwestern	571	712	44	.447	138
Indiana	521	715	44	.424	138
Total	13579	9500	810	.585	

== Conference USA ==
Conference USA
School	Won	Lost	Tied	Pct.	Years
Kennesaw State	73	40	0	.646	10
Jacksonville State	621	427	39	.589	115
Western Kentucky	624	432	30	.588	106
Middle Tennessee	610	472	28	.562	110
Louisiana Tech	645	504	37	.559	121
Liberty	307	258	4	.543	52
Sam Houston	581	492	34	.540	109
New Mexico State	458	680	30	.405	128
UTEP	413	643	30	.394	107
FIU	92	178	0	.341	23
Delaware	742	484	44	.602	136
Missouri State	492	532	39	.481	116
Total	4423	4126	232	.517	

== Independents ==
Independent schools
School	Won	Lost	Tied	Pct.	Years
Notre Dame	962	339	42	.732	135
UConn	530	613	38	.465	125
Total	2074	1601	130	.562	

== Mid-American Conference ==
Mid-American Conference
School	Won	Lost	Tied	Pct.	Years
Miami (OH)	733	489	44	.596	136
Central Michigan	651	458	36	.584	124
Bowling Green	569	432	52	.565	106
Toledo	588	457	24	.561	104
Western Michigan	603	488	24	.552	119
Northern Illinois	619	532	51	.536	123
Ohio	614	587	48	.511	129
Ball State	479	468	32	.506	100
Akron	529	601	36	.469	124
Eastern Michigan	495	630	47	.442	133
Buffalo	417	561	28	.428	111
Kent State	366	607	28	.380	102
UMass	582	649	50	.474	142
Total	6663	6310	450	.513	

== Mountain West Conference ==
Mountain West Conference
School	Won	Lost	Tied	Pct.	Years
Boise State	502	189	2	.726	57
Fresno State	651	454	27	.587	103
San Diego State	595	456	32	.564	102
Air Force	438	349	13	.556	69
Hawaii	589	499	25	.540	108
Nevada	580	531	33	.521	118
Utah State	577	575	31	.501	127
San Jose State	524	545	38	.491	107
Wyoming	568	608	28	.483	128
Colorado State	547	621	33	.469	126
New Mexico	504	647	31	.440	126
UNLV	264	389	4	.405	57
Total	6339	5863	297	.519	

== Pac-12 Conference ==
Pac-12 Conference
School	Won	Lost	Tied	Pct.	Years
Washington State	580	591	45	.495	129
Oregon State	569	636	50	.473	128
Total	1149	1227	95	.484	

== Southeastern Conference ==
Southeastern Conference
School	Won	Lost	Tied	Pct.	Years
Alabama	974	341	43	.733	130
Oklahoma	950	348	53	.723	130
Texas	961	395	33	.704	132
Tennessee	875	417	53	.670	128
Georgia	892	432	54	.667	131
LSU	815	438	47	.645	131
Florida	766	450	40	.626	118
Auburn	804	478	47	.623	132
Texas A&M	786	509	48	.603	130
Arkansas	747	545	40	.576	131
Ole Miss	685	550	35	.553	130
Missouri	721	593	52	.547	134
South Carolina	644	616	44	.511	131
Kentucky	647	655	44	.497	134
Mississippi State	588	619	39	.488	125
Vanderbilt	625	671	50	.483	135
Total	12480	8057	722	.604	

== Sun Belt Conference ==
Sun Belt Conference
School	Won	Lost	Tied	Pct.	Years
Appalachian State	669	360	29	.646	95
Coastal Carolina	172	96	0	.642	22
James Madison	378	225	4	.626	54
Georgia Southern	426	258	10	.621	61
Troy	579	439	28	.567	104
Southern Miss	614	471	26	.564	108
Old Dominion	97	86	0	.530	15
Marshall	638	574	47	.525	125
Texas State	541	505	25	.517	110
Louisiana	607	586	33	.496	125
Arkansas State	504	530	37	.488	110
South Alabama	90	98	0	.479	16
UL Monroe	330	471	8	.413	74
Georgia State	64	115	0	.358	15
Total	5677	4812	248	.540	

== See also ==
- NCAA Division I FCS football win–loss records
- NCAA Division II football win–loss records
